= 2017 V.League 2 =

V.League 2
- V.League 2
- Season: 2017
- Dates: 11 February – 26 July
- Champions: Nam Định (1st title)
- Matches: 42
- Goals: 106 (2.52 per match)
- Top goalscorer: (Vietnam) Võ Văn Minh (Huế) (Vietnam) Phạm Văn Thuận (Nam Định) (Vietnam) Nguyễn Hồng Quân (Đắk Lắk) (Vietnam) Bùi Duy Thường (Viettel) (5 goals)
- Biggest home win: Viettel 4-0 Fico Tây Ninh
- Biggest away win: Nam Định 0-4 Đồng Tháp
- Highest scoring: Fico Tây Ninh 4-2 Nam Định (6 goals)
- Longest winning run: Viettel; Nam Định (3 matches)
- Longest unbeaten run: Huế (7 matches)
- Longest winless run: Đồng Tháp (10 matches)
- Longest losing run: Đồng Tháp (4 matches)
- Highest attendance: 20,000 (Nam Định 1-0 Viettel)
- Lowest attendance: 200 (Viettel 1-1 Đắk Lắk)
- Total attendance: 103,900
- Average attendance: 2,474
- All statistics correct as of 26 July 2017.

The 2017 V.League 2 (referred to as Sứ Thiên Thanh V.League 2 for sponsorship reasons) is the 23rd season of V.League 2, Vietnam's second tier professional football league. The season began on 11 February 2017 and finished on 26 July 2017. The season started with 7 clubs after the withdrawals of 3 clubs without any replacements.

== Changes from last season ==
=== Team changes ===
The following teams had changed division since the 2016 season.

==== To V.League 2 ====
Promoted from Vietnamese Second League

- PVF

Relegated from V.League 1

- Đồng Tháp

==== From V.League 2 ====
Relegated to Vietnamese Second League

- Cà Mau

Relegated to Vietnamese Third League

- Đồng Nai (due to financial problems)

Promoted to V.League 1

- TP Hồ Chí Minh

Folded

- Phú Yên
- PVF

=== Rule changes ===
There is only one promotion spot for the champion. Club finishing last will play a play-off match against the 4th-placed club of 2017 Second League.

== Teams ==
=== Stadiums and locations ===
Locations of the 2017 V.League 2 teams

Team	Location	Stadium	Capacity
Bình Phước	Đồng Xoài	Bình Phước Stadium	10,000
Đắk Lắk	Buôn Ma Thuột	Buôn Ma Thuột Stadium	25,000
Đồng Tháp	Cao Lãnh	Cao Lãnh Stadium	23,000
Huế	Huế	Tự Do Stadium	25,000
Fico Tây Ninh	Tây Ninh	Tây Ninh Stadium	15,500
Nam Định	Nam Định	Thiên Trường Stadium	20,000
Viettel	Hà Nội	Hàng Đẫy Stadium	22,500

=== Personnel and kits ===
Team	Manager	Captain	Kit manufacturer	Shirt sponsor
Binh Phuoc FC	(Vietnam) Lê Thanh Xuân	(Vietnam) Đặng Trần Hoàng Nhựt		
Dak Lak FC	(Vietnam) Trần Phi Ái	(Vietnam) Huỳnh Văn Li		
Fico Tay Ninh	(Vietnam) Mang Văn Xích	(Vietnam) Lâm Văn Ngoan		Xi măng Fico
Hue FC	(Vietnam) Nguyễn Đức Dũng	(Vietnam) Trần Đình Minh Hoàng		
Nam Dinh FC	(Vietnam) Phạm Hồng Phú	(Vietnam) Nguyễn Hữu Định	Adidas (fake)	Mikado
Viettel FC	(Vietnam) Nguyễn Hải Biên	(Vietnam) Bùi Tiến Dũng	Mitre	BankPlus, 4G
Đồng Tháp FC	(Vietnam) Trần Công Minh	(Vietnam) Trần Minh Lợi	Codad	XSKT Đồng Tháp, Văn Hiến, Happy Food, Ranee

== League table ==
Pos	Team	Pld	W	D	L	GF	GA	GD	Pts	Promotion or relegation
1	Nam Định (C, P)	12	7	2	3	17	14	+3	23	Promotion to 2018 V.League 1
2	Huế	12	5	5	2	21	10	+11	20	
3	Bình Phước	12	6	1	5	11	12	−1	19	
4	Viettel	12	4	6	2	15	9	+6	18	
5	Đắk Lắk	12	4	3	5	14	18	−4	15	
6	Fico Tây Ninh	12	2	5	5	13	20	−7	11	
7	Đồng Tháp (O)	12	1	4	7	15	23	−8	7	V.League 2 play-off

Source: VPF
Rules for classification: 1) Points; 2) Head-to-head points; 3) Head-to-head goal difference; 4) Head-to-head goal scored; 5) Head-to-head away goal scored; 6) Goal difference; 7) Goals scored; 8) Away goal scored; 9) Play-off.
(C) Champions; (O) Play-off winners; (P) Promoted

== Results ==
Home \ Away	BPC	DLK	DTP	FTN	HUE	NDI	VTL
Bình Phước		1–0	3–2	1–0	0–0	2–1	2–1
Đắk Lắk	2–0		3–2	1–0	3–2	0–1	0–2
Đồng Tháp	0–1	2–2		1–1	0–3	0–2	0–1
Fico Tây Ninh	2–1	2–2	1–1		0–3	4–2	1–1
Huế	2–0	3–0	4–1	1–1		1–1	1–1
Nam Định	1–0	2–0	0–4	2–1	3–1		1–0
Viettel	1–0	1–1	2–2	4–0	0–0	1–1	

Legend: Blue = home team win; Yellow = draw; Red = away team win.

=== Play-off match ===
5 August 2017
16:00

Đồng Tháp	2–1	Bình Thuận
Bạch Đăng Khoa 48'; Nguyễn Ngọc Anh 90+2'	VFF	Nguyễn Vũ Trường Giang 57'

Tam Kỳ Stadium, Quảng Nam
Referee: Đặng Quốc Dũng

Đồng Tháp won the match and remained in 2018 V.League 2.

== Positions by round ==
Team ╲ Round	1	2	3	4	5	6	7	8	9	10	11	12	13	14
Bình Phước	2	4	2	3	3	3	3	2	4	4	4	3	3	3
Đắk Lắk	6	6	7	7	7	7	5	6	5	5	5	5	5	5
Đồng Tháp	7	3	3	4	5	6	7	7	7	7	7	7	7	7
Fico Tây Ninh	5	7	5	5	6	5	6	5	6	6	6	6	6	6
Huế F.C.	4	2	4	2	2	1	1	1	2	1	3	2	2	2
Nam Định	3	5	6	6	4	4	4	4	1	3	1	1	1	1
Viettel	1	1	1	1	1	2	2	3	3	2	2	4	4	4

Source: Vietnam Professional Football
= Winner; Promoted to V.League 1; = Relegation play-off

== Season progress ==
Win
Draw
Lose

Team ╲ Round	1	2	3	4	5	6	7	8	9	10	11	12	13	14
Bình Phước	W	L	W	L	D	W	-	W	L	-	L	W	L	W
Đắk Lắk	L	-	L	L	W	L	W	-	W	D	D	L	D	W
Đồng Tháp	L	W	D	L	-	L	L	L	D	D	D	L	-	L
Fico Tây Ninh	-	L	D	W	L	D	L	D	-	W	D	L	D	L
Huế F.C.	D	W	-	W	D	W	D	D	L	D	-	W	W	L
Nam Định	D	L	L	W	D	-	W	W	W	L	W	W	W	-
Viettel	W	W	W	-	D	D	D	L	D	D	D	-	L	W

Source: Vietnam Professional Football

== Season statistics ==
As of 27 July 2017

=== Top scorers ===
Rank	Player	Club	Goals
1	(Vietnam) Võ Văn Minh	Huế	5
1	(Vietnam) Phạm Văn Thuận	Nam Định	5
1	(Vietnam) Nguyễn Hồng Quân	Đắk Lắk	5
1	(Vietnam) Bùi Duy Thường	Viettel	5
5	(Vietnam) Nguyễn Thiện Chí	Đồng Tháp	4
5	(Vietnam) Lê Đức Tài	Fico Tây Ninh	4

=== Own goals ===
Player	Club	Against	Round
(Vietnam) Y Thăng Êban	Đắk Lắk	Nam Định	4
(Vietnam) Hồ Trường Khang	Đồng Tháp	Huế	4
(Vietnam) Nguyễn Quốc Thanh	Đắk Lắk	Đồng Tháp	7

=== Hattrick ===
Player	For	Against	Result	Date

== Speaking numbers ==
- Victory at home with the biggest score: Viettel won 4-0 against Fico Tay Ninh on Thien Truong Stadium in round 14 on July 26, 2017.
- The biggest away win: Nam Dinh lost 0-4 against Dong Thap on Thien Truong Stadium in the second round on 18 February 2017.
- Most goals scored: 6 goals in XM Fico Tay Ninh's 4-2 win over Nam Dinh on Tay Ninh in round 10 on July 1, 2017.
- The team has the longest winning sequence of three matches that is: Viettel from February 11 (round 1) to February 25, 2017 (round 3); Nam Dinh from July 5 (round 11) to July 15, 2017 (round 13).
- The team has the longest unbeaten 7 games, which is Hue from February 11 (round 1) to April 1, 2017 (round 8).
- The team has the longest winning streak of 10 games, which is Dong Thap from February 25 (Round 3) to July 26, 2017 (Round 14).
- The team has the longest losing streak of four matches, which is Dong Thap from March 4 (Round 4) to April 1, 2017 (Round 8).
- Audience attended the most 20,000 spectators in the match between Nam Dinh beat Viettel 1-0 at Thien Truong Stadium in round 13 on July 26, 2017.
- The audience attended at least 200 spectators in the match between Viettel 1-1 draw against Dak Lak on My Dinh National Stadium in round 11 on July 5, 2017.

== Attendances ==
As of 26 July 2017

=== By round ===
2017 V.League 2 Attendance
Round	Total	Games	Avg. Per Game
Round 1	7,000	3	2,333
Round 2	9,900	3	3,300
Round 3	5,200	3	1,733
Round 4	7,500	3	2,500
Round 5	3,000	3	1,000
Round 6	7,000	3	2,333
Round 7	5,500	3	1,833
Round 8	5,500	3	1,833
Round 9	8,400	3	2,800
Round 10	7,000	3	2,333
Round 11	6,700	3	2,233
Round 12	2,700	3	900
Round 13	26,000	3	8,667
Round 14	2,500	3	833
Total	103,900	42	2,474

=== By club ===
Pos	Team	Total	High	Low	Average	Change
1	Nam Định	43,000	20,000	3,000	7,167	n/a
2	Huế F.C.	19,000	4,000	2,000	3,167	n/a
3	Fico Tây Ninh	13,500	3,000	1,500	2,250	n/a
4	Đắk Lắk	8,500	2,000	1,000	1,417	n/a
5	Bình Phước	8,200	3,500	500	1,367	n/a
6	Đồng Tháp	7,200	2,000	500	1,200	n/a
7	Viettel	4,500	1,500	200	750	n/a
	League total	103,900	20,000	200	2,474	+12.1%

Updated to games played on 26 July 2017
Source: Vietnam Professional Football
