= 2018 V.League 2 =

V.League 2
- Season: 2018
- Dates: 14 April – 29 September
- Champions: Viettel (1st title)
- Promoted: Viettel
- Relegated: Công An Nhân Dân
- Matches: 90
- Goals: 245 (2.72 per match)
- Biggest home win: Đắk Lắk 5-0 Bình Phước
- Biggest away win: Công An Nhân Dân 0-4 Viettel
- Highest scoring: Fico Tây Ninh 5-4 Đắk Lắk (9 goals)
- Longest winning run: Viettel; Đắk Lắk (5)
- Longest unbeaten run: Viettel (8)
- Longest winless run: Công An Nhân Dân; Fico Tây Ninh (9)
- Longest losing run: Công An Nhân Dân (4)
- Highest attendance: 5000 (Bình Định TMS 0-1 Viettel)
- Lowest attendance: 50; Công An Nhân Dân 0-1 Huế
- Total attendance: 118,750
- Average attendance: 1,319
- All statistics correct as of finished.

The 2018 V.League 2 (referred to as An Cường V.League 2 for sponsorship reasons) is the 24th season of V.League 2, Vietnam's second tier professional football league. The season began on 14 April 2018 and will finish on 29 September 2018. The season started with 10 clubs.

== Changes from last season ==
=== Team changes ===
The following teams had changed division since the 2017 season.

==== To V.League 2 ====
Promoted from 2017 Vietnamese Second League

- Công An Nhân Dân
- Bình Định TMS
- Hà Nội B

Relegated from V.League 1

- Long An

==== From V.League 2 ====
Relegated to 2018 Vietnamese Second League

- None

Promoted to V.League 1

- Nam Định

=== Rule changes ===
There is one direct promotion spot for the champion. The team finishing second will play a play-off match against the 13th-placed club of 2018 V.League 1. The club finishing last will be relegated to the 2019 Second League.

=== Name changes ===
On 16 May 2018, Bình Định had changed its name to Bình Định TMS.

== Teams ==
=== Stadiums and locations ===
Locations of the 2018 V.League 2 teams

Team	Location	Stadium	Capacity
Bình Phước	Đồng Xoài	Bình Phước Stadium	10,000
Đắk Lắk	Buôn Ma Thuột	Buôn Ma Thuột Stadium	25,000
Đồng Tháp	Cao Lãnh	Cao Lãnh Stadium	23,000
Huế	Huế	Tự Do Stadium	25,000
Fico Tây Ninh	Tây Ninh	Tây Ninh Stadium	15,500
Long An	Long An	Long An Stadium	19,975
Viettel	Hà Nội	Hàng Đẫy Stadium	22,500
Hà Nội B	Hà Nội	Hàng Đẫy Stadium	22,500
Công An Nhân Dân	Hà Nội	Thanh Trì Stadium	4,000
Bình Định TMS	Quy Nhơn	Quy Nhơn Stadium	25,000

=== Personnel and kits ===
Team	Manager	Captain	Kit manufacturer	Shirt sponsor
Bình Phước	(Vietnam) Lê Thanh Xuân	(Vietnam) Đặng Trần Hoàng Nhựt		
Đắk Lắk	(Vietnam) Trần Phi Ái	(Vietnam) Nguyễn Quốc Thanh		
Fico Tây Ninh	(Vietnam) Mang Văn Xích	(Vietnam) Lâm Văn Ngoan		Xi măng Fico
Huế	(Vietnam) Nguyễn Đức Dũng	(Vietnam) Trần Đình Minh Hoàng		
Công An Nhân Dân	(Vietnam) Nguyễn Văn Tuấn	(Vietnam) Nguyễn Văn Giang	Jogarbola	
Viettel	(Vietnam) Nguyễn Hải Biên	(Vietnam) Bùi Tiến Dũng		Viettel Pay
Đồng Tháp	(Vietnam) Trần Công Minh	(Vietnam) Trần Minh Lợi	Grand Sport	XSKT Đồng Tháp, Văn Hiến, Happy Food, Ranee
Hà Nội B	(Vietnam) Phạm Minh Đức	(Vietnam) Dương Quang Tuấn	Kappa	SCG
Bình Định TMS	(Vietnam) Bùi Đoàn Quang Huy	(Vietnam) Lê Thanh Tài		TMS Group
Long An	(Vietnam) Phan Văn Giàu	(Vietnam) Nguyễn Tài Lộc	Kappa	Cảng Long An, Đồng Tâm Long An

== League table ==
Pos	Team	Pld	W	D	L	GF	GA	GD	Pts	Promotion or relegation
1	Viettel (C, P)	18	13	2	3	37	15	+22	41	Promotion to 2019 V.League 1
2	Hà Nội B (Q)	18	8	7	3	32	20	+12	31	Play-off
3	Đồng Tháp	18	9	4	5	23	17	+6	31	
4	Đắk Lắk	18	7	4	7	31	24	+7	25	
5	Long An	18	5	9	4	24	27	−3	24	
6	Fico Tây Ninh	18	5	5	8	23	31	−8	20 (Note: Fico Tây Ninh ahead of Huế by head-to-head record: TN 2-0 HUE; HUE 3-2 TN)	
7	Huế	18	5	5	8	26	31	−5	20	
8	Bình Phước	18	3	9	6	13	24	−11	18 (Note: Bình Phước ahead of Bình Định TMS by head-to-head record: BD 0-0 BP; BP 2-0 BD)	
9	Bình Định TMS	18	4	6	8	21	29	−8	18	
10	Công An Nhân Dân (R)	18	4	3	11	15	27	−12	15	Relegation to 2019 Second League

Source: VPF
Rules for classification: 1) Points; 2) Head-to-head points; 3) Head-to-head goal difference; 4) Head-to-head goal scored; 5) Head-to-head away goal scored; 6) Goal difference; 7) Goals scored; 8) Away goal scored; 9) Play-off.
(C) Champions; (P) Promoted; (Q) Qualified for the phase indicated; (R) Relegated

== Results ==
Home \ Away	BDI	BPC	CND	DLK	DTP	FTN	HNB	HUE	LAN	VTL
Bình Định TMS		0–0	1–0	3–2	0–0	2–2	1–1	5–2	4–0	0–1
Bình Phước	2–0		1–0	0–2	1–0	1–1	2–2	1–1	1–1	0–2
Công An Nhân Dân	1–1	1–1		1–0	1–2	3–1	3–4	0–1	2–1	0–4
Đắk Lắk	2–1	5–0	0–1		0–0	3–0	0–0	3–3	2–2	3–2
Đồng Tháp	2–0	3–2	1–0	1–0		1–0	1–1	5–3	3–1	1–0
Fico Tây Ninh	2–0	0–0	1–1	5–4	1–0		0–2	2–0	2–2	1–0
Hà Nội B	5–1	3–0	3–0	1–2	2–0	2–1		0–3	1–1	1–2
Huế F.C.	3–0	0–0	2–0	1–3	1–1	3–2	0–1		1–1	1–3
Long An	2–2	1–1	1–0	1–0	2–1	2–1	2–2	1–0		2–3
Viettel	2–0	2–0	2–1	2–0	2–1	5–1	1–1	3–1	1–1	

Legend: Blue = home team win; Yellow = draw; Red = away team win.

== Positions by round ==
Team ╲ Round	1	2	3	4	5	6	7	8	9	10	11	12	13	14	15	16	17	18
Bình Định TMS	2	6	9	10	10	10	8	5	7	8	8	8	9	6	7	9	9	9
Bình Phước	3	9	10	8	8	6	6	8	8	7	7	7	7	8	9	8	8	8
Công An Nhân Dân	9	4	8	7	9	9	10	10	10	10	10	10	10	10	10	10	10	10
Đắk Lắk	1	3	4	6	7	8	9	7	6	5	4	3	3	2	4	4	4	4
Đồng Tháp	5	2	3	2	2	2	2	3	2	2	2	2	2	4	3	3	3	3
Fico Tây Ninh	10	5	1	5	6	7	7	9	9	9	9	9	8	9	8	7	7	6
Hà Nội B	4	7	6	9	5	4	4	2	3	3	3	4	4	3	2	2	2	2
Huế F.C.	7	10	5	3	3	5	5	4	4	6	6	6	4	7	6	6	6	7
Long An	6	8	7	4	4	3	3	6	5	4	5	5	5	5	5	5	5	5
Viettel	8	1	2	1	1	1	1	1	1	1	1	1	1	1	1	1	1	1

Source: Vietnam Professional Football
= Winner; Promoted to V.League 1; = Play-off; = Relegation to 2019 Second League

== Season progress ==
Team ╲ Round	1	2	3	4	5	6	7	8	9	10	11	12	13	14	15	16	17	18
Bình Định TMS	W	L	L	L	D	L	W	W	L	L	D	D	L	W	D	L	D	D
Bình Phước	D	L	D	D	D	W	L	D	D	W	L	L	D	D	L	W	L	D
Công An Nhân Dân	L	W	L	D	L	L	D	L	L	L	L	W	L	W	L	L	W	D
Đắk Lắk	W	L	D	L	L	D	W	L	W	W	W	W	W	D	L	D	L	L
Đồng Tháp	D	W	D	W	W	L	L	W	W	W	W	D	L	L	W	L	D	W
Fico Tây Ninh	L	W	W	L	L	L	D	L	D	L	D	L	W	D	D	W	L	W
Hà Nội B	D	D	D	L	W	W	W	W	L	W	D	D	W	D	W	W	D	L
Huế F.C.	D	L	W	W	D	D	L	D	W	L	L	L	D	L	W	L	W	L
Long An	D	D	D	W	D	W	L	L	W	W	D	D	W	L	L	D	D	D
Viettel	D	W	D	W	W	W	W	W	L	L	W	W	L	W	W	W	W	W

Source: Vietnam Professional Football
W = Win; D = Draw; L = Lose

== Attendances ==
=== By round ===
2018 V.League 2 Attendance
Round	Total	Games	Avg. Per Game
Round 1	13,300	5	2,660
Round 2	5,100	5	1,020
Round 3	7,200	5	1,440
Round 4	8,900	5	1,780
Round 5	10,500	5	2,100
Round 6	3,800	5	760
Round 7	7,500	5	1,500
Round 8	6,600	5	1,320
Round 9	4,100	5	820
Round 10	3,700	5	740
Round 11	5,500	5	1,100
Round 12	4,700	5	940
Round 13	6,000	5	1,200
Round 14	6,300	5	1,260
Round 15	5,750	5	1,150
Round 16	5,500	5	1,100
Round 17	7,500	5	1,500
Round 6	6,800	5	1,360
Total	118,750	90	1,319

=== By club ===
Pos	Team	Total	High	Low	Average	Change
1	Bình Định TMS	25,000	5,000	2,000	2,778	n/a^{†}
2	Đồng Tháp	15,700	3,000	500	1,744	+45.3%
3	Viettel	14,600	4,000	500	1,622	+116.3%
4	Huế	13,000	2,500	500	1,444	−54.4%
5	Đắk Lắk	13,000	2,000	500	1,444	+1.9%
6	Fico Tây Ninh	11,700	2,000	1,000	1,300	−42.2%
7	Hà Nội B	7,700	4,000	200	856	n/a^{†}
8	Bình Phước	6,500	1,000	200	722	−47.2%
9	Long An	5,900	1,000	500	656	−73.9%^{††}
10	Công An Nhân Dân	4,850	1,500	50	539	n/a^{†}
	League total	118,750	5,000	50	1,319	−46.7%

Updated to games played on finished
Source: Vietnam Professional Football
Notes:
^{†} Teams played previous season in Second League
^{††} Teams played previous season in V.League 1

== Season statistics ==
As of 11 September 2018

=== Top scorers ===
Rank	Player	Club	Goals
1	(Vietnam) Y Thăng Êban	Đắk Lắk	12
2	(Vietnam) Nguyễn Tuấn Anh	Long An	8
3	(Vietnam) Phạm Tuấn Hải	Hà Nội B	7
3	(Vietnam) Trần Đức Nam	Hà Nội B	7
3	(Vietnam) Nguyễn Hoàng Đức	Viettel	7
6	(Vietnam) Bùi Quang Khải	Viettel	5
6	(Vietnam) Nguyễn Thiện Chí	Đồng Tháp	5

=== Own goals ===
Player	Club	Against	Round
(Vietnam) Nguyễn Đồng Tháp	Đồng Tháp	Huế	1
(Vietnam) Nguyễn Quốc Thanh	Đắk Lắk	Huế	6
(Vietnam) Bùi Văn Đức	Công An Nhân Dân	Viettel	6
(Vietnam) Lê Văn Phương	Fico Tây Ninh	Long An	11
(Vietnam) Lê Thành Phong	Huế	Viettel	12
(Vietnam) Rơ Lan Dem	Bình Phước	Fico Tây Ninh	14
(Vietnam) Châu Lê Phước Vĩnh	Long An	Viettel	15
(Vietnam) Nguyễn Thành Trung	Long An	Viettel	15

=== Hattrick ===
Player	For	Against	Result	Date	Round
(Vietnam) Trần Thành	Huế	Hà Nội B	3-0 (A)	18 May 2018	5
(Vietnam) Y Thăng Êban	Đắk Lắk	Bình Phước	5-0 (H)	9 June 2018	7
(Vietnam) Lê Đức Tài	Fico Tây Ninh	Đắk Lắk	5-4 (H)	5 October 2018	18

- Note: (H)-Home; (A)-Away
