= 2018 Vietnamese National Football Second League =

Vietnamese National Football Second League
- Season: 2018
- Champions: An Giang; Phù Đổng
- Promoted: An Giang; Phù Đổng; Phố Hiến
- Relegated: none
- Matches: 75
- Goals: 279 (3.72 per match)
- Biggest home win: Lâm Đồng 8-0 Fishsan Khánh Hòa; Lâm Đồng 9-1 Nam Định B
- Biggest away win: Fishsan Khánh Hòa 1-7 Bình Thuận
- Highest scoring: Lâm Đồng 9-1 Nam Định B Nam Định B 5-5 Fishsan Khánh Hòa (10 goals)
- Longest winning run: Bà Rịa Vũng Tàu (7)
- Longest unbeaten run: Phố Hiến (11)
- Longest winless run: Nam Định B (12)
- Longest losing run: Nam Định B (8)

The 2018 Vietnamese National Football Second League was the 20th season of the Vietnamese National Football Second League. The season began on 25 April 2018 and finished on 15 July 2018.

== Rule changes ==
In this season, there are 13 teams divided in two groups in qualifying stage according to geographic region. The top 2 teams of each group will be qualified to final round. In final round, 4 teams will play 3 matches:

- Match 1: 1A vs 2B
- Match 2: 1B vs 2A
- Match 3: Match 1 loser vs Match 2 loser

The winners of each match will promote to 2019 V.League 2. There are no teams relegated to 2019 Vietnamese Third League.

== Team changes ==
The following teams have changed division since the 2017 season.

=== To Vietnamese Second League ===
Promoted from Vietnamese Third League

- Bà Rịa Vũng Tàu
- Nam Định B
- Vĩnh Long
- Quảng Ngãi

Relegated from V.League 2

- None

Team transfer

- Fishsan Khánh Hòa (transferred from Cà Mau)
- Phố Hiến (transferred from PVF)

=== From Vietnamese Second League ===
Relegated to Vietnamese Third League

- Sanatech Khánh Hòa

Promoted to V.League 2

- Công An Nhân Dân
- Bình Định
- Hà Nội B

Team transfer

- Cà Mau (transferred from Fishsan Khánh Hòa)
- PVF (transferred from Phố Hiến)

Withdrew

- Viettel B
- Quảng Ngãi
- Mancons Sài Gòn

== Teams map → ==
Team location in Vietnam map

== Qualifying round ==
=== Group A ===
Pos	Team	Pld	W	D	L	GF	GA	GD	Pts	Qualification or relegation
1	Phố Hiến (Q, P)	12	8	3	1	30	6	+24	27	Advance to final round
2	Phù Đổng (Q, P)	12	8	3	1	26	6	+20	27	Advance to final round
3	Lâm Đồng	12	7	4	1	32	6	+26	25	
4	Bình Thuận	12	6	1	5	22	15	+7	19	
5	Kon Tum	12	4	2	6	23	29	−6	14	
6	Fishsan Khánh Hòa	12	1	1	10	17	54	−37	4	
7	Nam Định B	12	0	2	10	17	51	−34	2	

Updated to match(es) played on 5 July 2018. Source:
(P) Promoted; (Q) Qualified for the phase indicated

=== Group B ===
Pos	Team	Pld	W	D	L	GF	GA	GD	Pts	Qualification or relegation
1	Bà Rịa Vũng Tàu (Q)	10	9	0	1	37	8	+29	27	Advance to final round
2	An Giang (Q, P)	10	7	1	2	21	11	+10	22	Advance to final round
3	Tiền Giang	10	3	4	3	21	15	+6	13	
4	Bến Tre	10	3	2	5	14	26	−12	11	
5	Vĩnh Long	10	2	2	6	13	24	−11	8	
6	Long An B	10	0	3	7	11	33	−22	3	

Updated to match(es) played on 5 July 2018. Source:
(P) Promoted; (Q) Qualified for the phase indicated

== Results ==
=== Group A ===
Home \ Away	BTH	FKH	KTU	LDO	NDI	PHI	PDO
Bình Thuận		3–0	4–2	0–0	2–0	0–1	0–1
Fishsan Khánh Hòa	1–7		3–4	2–4	5–4	0–3	0–3
Kon Tum	2–1	4–0		0–2	1–1	1–1	1–2
Lâm Đồng	0–1	8–0	4–1		9–1	1–0	0–0
Nam Định B	3–4	5–5	2–5	0–3		1–3	0–3
Phố Hiến	1–0	7–0	5–1	1–1	5–0		0–0
Phù Đổng	4–0	2–1	4–1	0–0	6–0	1–3	

Updated to match(es) played on 5 July 2018. Source:
Legend: Blue = home team win; Yellow = draw; Red = away team win.

Team ╲ Round	1	2	3	4	5	6	7	8	9	10	11	12	13	14
Bình Thuận	3	1	2	2	4	4	4	3	2	4	4	4	4	4
Fishsan Khánh Hòa	6	6	7	6	6	6	6	6	6	6	6	6	6	6
Kon Tum	2	5	5	5	5	5	5	5	5	5	5	5	5	5
Lâm Đồng	4	2	1	1	1	1	2	4	3	1	3	3	3	3
Nam Định B	7	7	6	7	7	7	7	7	7	7	7	7	7	7
Phố Hiến	1	4	4	4	3	2	3	1	4	2	1	1	1	1
Phù Đổng	5	3	3	3	2	3	1	2	1	3	2	2	2	2

Updated to match(es) played on 5 July 2018. Source:
= Winner; = Advanced to final round

=== Group B ===
Home \ Away	AGI	BRVT	BTR	LAB	TGI	PVF
An Giang		1–0	1–2	1–0	1–0	3–1
Bà Rịa Vũng Tàu	3–2		3–0	6–1	3–1	6–1
Bến Tre	1–4	1–5		2–0	2–2	2–1
Long An B	3–4	0–5	2–2		3–3	0–0
Tiền Giang	0–0	1–2	5–1	6–1		1–1
Vĩnh Long	1–4	0–4	3–1	4–1	1–2	

Legend: Blue = home team win; Yellow = draw; Red = away team win.

Team ╲ Round	1	2	3	4	5	6	7	8	9	10
An Giang	4	3	1	1	1	1	1	2	2	2
Bà Rịa Vũng Tàu	1	1	2	2	2	2	2	1	1	1
Bến Tre	5	5	5	5	5	5	5	4	4	4
Long An B	6	6	6	6	6	6	6	6	6	6
Tiền Giang	3	2	3	3	3	3	3	3	3	3
Vĩnh Long	2	4	4	4	4	4	4	5	5	5

Updated to match(es) played on 5 July 2018. Source:
= Winner; = Advanced to final round

== Season progress ==
=== Group A ===
Team ╲ Round	1	2	3	4	5	6	7	8	9	10	11	12	13	14
Bình Thuận	D	W	W	L	L	-	W	W	W	L	L	L	-	W
Fishsan Khánh Hòa	L	L	L	W	-	L	L	L	L	L	D	-	L	L
Kon Tum	W	L	L	D	L	W	-	W	L	W	L	L	D	-
Lâm Đồng	D	W	W	-	W	D	D	L	W	W	-	W	D	W
Nam Định B	L	L	-	L	L	L	L	L	L	-	D	L	D	L
Phố Hiến	W	-	D	D	W	W	D	W	-	W	W	W	W	L
Phù Đổng	-	W	D	W	W	D	W	-	W	L	W	W	D	W

Updated to match(es) played on 5 July 2018. Source:

=== Group B ===
Team ╲ Round	1	2	3	4	5	6	7	8	9	10
An Giang	D	W	W	W	W	W	W	L	W	L
Bà Rịa Vũng Tàu	W	W	L	W	W	W	W	W	W	W
Bến Tre	L	L	D	D	L	W	L	W	L	W
Long An B	L	L	D	L	D	L	D	L	L	L
Tiền Giang	D	W	D	D	L	L	D	W	W	L
Vĩnh Long	W	L	D	L	D	L	L	L	L	W

Updated to match(es) played on 5 July 2018. Source:
W = Win; D = Draw; L = Lose

== Final round ==
=== Match 1 ===
14 July 2018
15:30

Phố Hiến	0–1	An Giang
	VFF	Võ Văn Công 33'

Phú Yên Stadium, Phú Yên
Attendance: Lê Lưu Quang

An Giang promoted to 2019 V.League 2.

=== Match 2 ===
15 July 2018
15:30

Bà Rịa Vũng Tàu	0–0	Phù Đổng
	VFF
Penalties
	2–3

Phú Yên Stadium, Phú Yên
Referee: Mai Xuân Hùng

Phù Đổng promoted to 2019 V.League 2.

=== Match 3 ===
18 July 2018
15:30

Phố Hiến	4-1	Bà Rịa Vũng Tàu
Mai Sỹ Hoàng 6'; Trần Bảo Toàn 45+2', 78'; Huỳnh Công Đến 73'	VFF	Trần Quốc Tuấn 65'

Phú Yên Stadium, Phú Yên

Phố Hiến promoted to 2019 V.League 2.
