= 2019 V.League 2 =

V.League 2
- Season: 2019
- Dates: 5 April – 5 October
- Champions: Hồng Lĩnh Hà Tĩnh (1st title)
- Promoted: Hồng Lĩnh Hà Tĩnh
- Relegated: Phù Đổng
- Matches: 66
- Goals: 187 (2.83 per match)
- Top goalscorer: Nguyễn Xuân Nam (9 goals)
- Biggest home win: Huế 5–0 An Giang (2 June 2019)
- Biggest away win: XSKT Cần Thơ 0–4 An Giang (6 May 2019); Bình Định 0–4 Phố Hiến (25 May 2019); Huế 0–4 Phố Hiến (12 June 2019)
- Highest scoring: Bình Phước 4–3 Phù Đổng (13 April 2019)
- Longest winning run: 5 matches Hồng Lĩnh Hà Tĩnh
- Longest unbeaten run: 8 matches Hồng Lĩnh Hà Tĩnh
- Longest winless run: 7 matches Phù Đổng
- Longest losing run: 6 matches Phù Đổng
- Highest attendance: 5,000; XM Fico Tây Ninh 1–2 Bình Định (1 June 2019)
- Lowest attendance: 300; Long An 2–1 Bình Định (11 May 2019); Phù Đổng 0–1 Bình Định (12 June 2019)
- Total attendance: 114,100
- Average attendance: 1,729

The 2019 V.League 2 (referred to as LS V.League 2 for sponsorship reasons) was the 25th season of V.League 2, Vietnam's second tier professional football league. The season began on 5 April 2019 and finished on 5 October 2019. The season started with 12 clubs.

== Changes from last season ==
=== Team changes ===
The following teams had changed division since the 2018 season.

==== To V.League 2 ====
Promoted from 2018 Vietnamese National Football Second League

- Phố Hiến
- Phù Đổng
- An Giang

Relegated from 2018 V.League 1

- XSKT Cần Thơ

==== From V.League 2 ====
Relegated to 2019 Vietnamese National Football Second League

- Công An Nhân Dân

Promoted to 2019 V.League 1

- Viettel

=== Rule changes ===
There is one direct promotion spot for the champion. The team finishing second will play a play-off match against the 13th-placed club of 2019 V.League 1. The club finishing last will be relegated to the 2020 Vietnamese National Football Second League

=== Name changes ===
In November 2018 Hà Nội B F.C. renamed as Hồng Lĩnh Hà Tĩnh

== Teams ==
=== Stadiums and locations ===
Locations of the 2019 V.League 2 teams

Team	Location	Stadium	Capacity
An Giang	An Giang	An Giang Stadium	15,200
Bình Định	Quy Nhơn	Quy Nhơn Stadium	25,000
Bình Phước	Bình Phước	Bình Phước Stadium	10,000
Đắk Lắk	Buôn Ma Thuột	Buôn Ma Thuột Stadium	25,000
Đồng Tháp	Cao Lãnh	Cao Lãnh Stadium	23,000
Hồng Lĩnh Hà Tĩnh	Hà Tĩnh	Hà Tĩnh Stadium	20,000
Hồng Lĩnh Hà Tĩnh	Nghệ An	Vinh Stadium	18,000
Huế	Huế	Tự Do Stadium	25,000
Long An	Long An	Long An Stadium	19,975
Phố Hiến	Hưng Yên	PVF Stadium	4,600
Phù Đổng	Hà Nội	Mỹ Đình National Stadium	40,192
Phù Đổng	Hà Nội	Thanh Trì Stadium	4,000
XM Fico Tây Ninh	Tây Ninh	Tây Ninh Stadium	15,500
XSKT Cần Thơ	Cần Thơ	Cần Thơ Stadium	44,400

=== Personnel and kits ===
Team	Manager	Captain	Kit manufacturer	Shirt sponsor
An Giang	(Vietnam) Trịnh Văn Hậu			
Bình Định	(Vietnam) Phan Tôn Quyền			
Bình Phước	(Vietnam) Lê Thanh Xuân			
Đắk Lắk	(Vietnam) Trương Minh Tiến			
Đồng Tháp	(Vietnam) Trần Công Minh		Grand Sport	XSKT Đồng Tháp, Happy Food, Đại Học Văn Hiến
Hồng Lĩnh Hà Tĩnh	(Vietnam) Phạm Minh Đức			
Huế	(Vietnam) Phan Văn Trí		Adidas (fake)	
Long An	(Vietnam) Ngô Quang Sang			Cảng Long An, Dong Tam Group
Phố Hiến	(Vietnam) Hứa Hiền Vinh		Grand Sport	Tân Á Đại Thành
Phù Đổng	(Vietnam) Lê Đức Tuấn		UGETHER	Mitsubishi Motors
XM Fico Tây Ninh	(Vietnam) Nguyễn Hoàng Huân Chương			Xi măng Fico
XSKT Cần Thơ	(Vietnam) Nguyễn Thanh Danh		KeepDri	XSKT Cần Thơ

== League table ==
Pos	Team	Pld	W	D	L	GF	GA	GD	Pts	Promotion or relegation
1	Hồng Lĩnh Hà Tĩnh (C, P)	22	17	2	3	50	15	+35	53	Promotion to 2020 V.League 1
2	Phố Hiến (Q)	22	11	7	4	37	22	+15	40	Play-off
3	Bình Phước	22	11	4	7	33	25	+8	37	
4	An Giang	22	9	6	7	32	27	+5	33	
5	Long An	22	9	5	8	30	31	−1	32	
6	Huế	22	9	2	11	33	36	−3	29	
7	XM Fico Tây Ninh	22	8	4	10	32	33	−1	28 (Note: XM Fico Tây Ninh ahead of Đắk Lắk by goal difference: FTN 3-1 DL; DL 4-2 FTN)	
8	Đắk Lắk	22	8	4	10	28	31	−3	28	
9	Đồng Tháp	22	5	8	9	26	32	−6	23	
10	XSKT Cần Thơ	22	4	10	8	17	33	−16	22	
11	Bình Định	22	5	6	11	18	37	−19	21	
12	Phù Đổng (R)	22	5	4	13	22	36	−14	19	Relegation to 2020 Second League

Updated to match(es) played on 22 September 2019. Source: VPF
Rules for classification: 1) Points; 2) Head-to-head points; 3) Head-to-head goal difference; 4) Head-to-head goal scored; 5) Head-to-head away goal scored; 6) Goal difference; 7) Goals scored; 8) Away goal scored; 9) Play-off.
(C) Champions; (P) Promoted; (Q) Qualified for the phase indicated; (R) Relegated

== Results ==
Home \ Away	AGI	BDI	BPC	DLK	DTP	HHT	HUE	LAN	PHI	PDO	FTN	CTH
An Giang								3–0			0–0	
Bình Định	0–1			2–1	2–2							
Bình Phước		3–0			2–1					4–3		
Đắk Lắk							2–0		1–2			
Đồng Tháp								2–0				
Hồng Lĩnh Hà Tĩnh							2–1		3–3			
Huế			0–1					4–0				0–0
Long An				3–2		2–1						
Phố Hiến			1–0								0–1	1–1
Phù Đổng	1–1				0–1	0–2						
XM Fico Tây Ninh				3–1		0–1						
XSKT Cần Thơ	0–4	0–0								3–1		

Source: vpf.vn
Legend: Blue = home team win; Yellow = draw; Red = away team win.

== Positions by round ==
Team ╲ Round	1	2	3	4	5	6	7	8	9	10	11	12	13	14	15	16	17	18	19	20	21	22
An Giang	6	3	1	3	2	2	3	4	5	7	5	4	4	4	4	4	4					4
Bình Định	5	7	9	10	9	11	11	11	11	8	11	11	11	11	11	11	11					11
Bình Phước	11	5	4	2	1	1	1	1	2	2	3	3	3	3	2	3	3					3
Đắk Lắk	10	11	12	9	11	9	10	10	8	9	8	7	6	7	6	7	8					8
Đồng Tháp	4	4	2	1	4	5	7	5	6	4	4	5	5	5	7	8	9					9
Hồng Lĩnh Hà Tĩnh	2	2	5	5	3	3	2	2	1	1	1	1	1	1	1	1	1	1	1			1
Huế	8	10	11	12	10	8	5	6	4	6	7	6	7	6	5	6	6					6
Long An	1	6	6	7	8	7	9	9	7	5	6	8	8	8	8	5	5					5
Phố Hiến	3	1	3	4	5	6	4	3	3	3	2	2	2	2	3	2	2					2
Phù Đổng	7	9	10	11	12	12	12	12	12	12	12	12	12	12	12	12	12					12
XM Fico Tây Ninh	12	12	7	8	6	4	6	7	9	10	9	10	9	9	10	9	7					7
XSKT Cần Thơ	9	8	8	6	7	10	8	8	10	11	10	10	10	10	9	10	10					10

Winner; Promoted to V.League 1
Play-off
Relegation to Second League

== Season progress ==
Team ╲ Round	1	2	3	4	5	6	7	8	9	10	11	12	13	14	15	16	17	18	19	20	21	22
An Giang	D	W	W	D	W	D	D	L	L	L	W	W	W	W	L	W	L	D	D	L	L	W
Bình Định	D	D	L	L	W	L	L	L	W	W	L	L	D	D	L	W	L	D	W	D	L	L
Bình Phước	L	W	W	W	W	D	W	W	L	W	L	W	D	D	W	L	L	D	L	L	W	W
Đắk Lắk	L	L	L	W	L	W	D	L	W	L	W	W	D	L	W	L	D	D	L	W	L	W
Đồng Tháp	D	W	W	W	L	L	L	W	L	W	D	L	D	L	D	L	L	D	D	D	L	D
Hồng Lĩnh Hà Tĩnh	W	W	L	D	W	D	W	W	W	W	W	L	W	W	W	W	W	W	L	W	W	W
Huế	D	L	L	L	W	W	W	L	W	L	L	W	L	D	W	L	W	L	W	L	W	L
Long An	W	L	W	L	L	W	L	D	D	W	D	L	L	D	W	W	W	W	D	L	W	L
Phố Hiến	W	W	D	D	L	D	W	W	W	W	D	W	D	D	L	W	W	L	W	W	L	D
Phù Đổng	D	L	L	L	L	L	L	W	D	L	L	L	W	D	L	L	L	L	W	W	L	D
XM Fico Tây Ninh	L	L	W	D	W	W	L	L	L	L	W	L	D	D	L	W	W	W	D	L	W	L
XSKT Cần Thơ	D	D	D	W	L	L	W	D	L	L	D	W	L	D	D	L	D	D	L	W	L	D

Win
Draw
Lose

== Attendances ==
=== By round ===
2019 V.League 2 Attendance
Round	Total	Games	Avg. Per Game
Round 1	12,500	6	2,083
Round 2	12,000	6	2,000
Round 3	12,000	6	2,000
Round 4	9,200	6	1,533
Round 5	10,600	6	1,767
Round 6		6	
Round 7		6	
Round 8		6	
Round 9		6	
Round 10		6	
Round 11		6	
Round 12		6	
Round 13	9,100	6	1,516
Round 14	13,700	6	2,283
Round 15		6	
Round 16		6	
Round 17		6	
Round 18		6	
Round 19		6	
Round 20		6	
Round 21		6	
Round 22		6	
Total		132	

== Season statistics ==
=== Top scorers ===
As of 16 June 2019.

Rank	Player	Club	Goals
1	(Vietnam) Nguyễn Xuân Nam	Phố Hiến	9
2	(Vietnam) Tạ Thái Học	Bình Phước	6
2	(Vietnam) Ngô Hồng Phước	An Giang	6
2	(Vietnam) Lâm Thuận	Bình Phước	6
2	(Vietnam) Nguyễn Hữu Thắng	Huế	6
6	(Vietnam) Huỳnh Tấn Tài	Long An	5
6	(Vietnam) Lâm Hải Đăng	XSKT Cần Thơ	5
6	(Vietnam) Y Thăng Êban	Đắk Lắk	5
6	(Vietnam) Nguyễn Công Thành	Đồng Tháp	5
6	(Vietnam) Nguyễn Thiện Chí	Đồng Tháp	5
6	(Vietnam) Lê Đức Tài	XM Fico Tây Ninh	5

=== Hattrick ===
Player	For	Against	Result	Date

== See also ==
- 2019 V.League 1
- 2019 Vietnamese National Football Second League
- 2019 Vietnamese National Football Third League
