= 2010 Vietnamese National Football Second League =

Vietnamese National Football Second League
- Season: 2010
- Champions: Nguyễn Hoàng Kiên Giang
- Promoted: Nguyễn Hoàng Kiên Giang; Hòa Phát V&V
- Relegated: none

The Vietnamese National Football Second League has 17 teams, both professional and semi-professional, is divided into 3 groups, 2 groups with 6 teams and 1 group with 5 teams.

Teams play in a round robin format. the 3 top teams as well as the 2nd team with most points qualifies for promotion playoff.

The 2 winners are promoted to the V.League 2. No teams are relegated and no foreign players are permitted to play.

== Group stage ==
=== Group A ===
Pos	Team	Pld	W	D	L	GF	GA	GD	Pts	Qualification
1	Hòa Phát V&V	8	5	2	1	14	7	+7	17	Semi-finals
2	Megastar United	8	2	6	0	12	6	+6	12	
3	T&T Baoercheng	8	3	1	4	12	14	−2	10	
4	Xuân Thành Hà Tĩnh Cement	8	3	1	4	14	13	+1	10	
5	Công An Nhân Dân	8	1	2	5	8	20	−12	5	

=== Group B ===
Pos	Team	Pld	W	D	L	GF	GA	GD	Pts	Qualification
1	Pha Đin Quảng Ngãi	10	4	5	1	14	7	+7	17	Semi-finals
2	Lâm Đồng	10	3	6	1	12	10	+2	15	
3	5th Military Region	10	3	5	2	11	13	−2	14	
4	Bình Thuận	10	4	1	5	12	14	−2	13	
5	DIC Bà Rịa Vũng Tàu	10	2	4	4	10	13	−3	10	
6	Đắk Lắk	10	2	3	5	10	12	−2	9	

=== Group C ===
Pos	Team	Pld	W	D	L	GF	GA	GD	Pts	Qualification
1	Dược Sài Gòn	10	7	2	1	18	6	+12	23	Semi-finals
2	Nguyễn Hoàng Kiên Giang	10	6	3	1	20	5	+15	21	Semi-finals
3	Cà Mau	10	3	3	4	9	17	−8	12	
4	Tôn Phương Nam Hồ Chí Minh City	10	2	3	5	12	15	−3	9	
5	Ngói Đồng Tâm Long An	10	3	0	7	16	25	−9	9	
6	Maseco Arirang	10	2	3	5	10	17	−7	9	

== Knockout phase ==
=== Semi-finals ===
7 June 2010
15:30

Hòa Phát V&V	2–2	Dược Sài Gòn
Penalties
	4–1

Tự Do Stadium, Huế
Attendance: 2,000
Referee: Nguyễn Đức Vũ
7 June 2010
17:40

Pha Đin Quảng Ngãi	2–3	Nguyễn Hoàng Kiên Giang

Tự Do Stadium, Huế
Attendance: 500
Referee: Kiều Việt Hùng

=== Final ===
9 June 2010
16:00

Hòa Phát V&V	1–3	Nguyễn Hoàng Kiên Giang

Tự Do Stadium, Huế
Attendance: 300
Referee: Trần Văn Lập
