= 2009 Vietnamese National Football Second League =

Vietnamese National Football Second League
- Season: 2009
- Champions: TDC Bình Dương

The 2009 Vietnamese National Football Second League has 16 teams, both professional and semi-professional, is divided into 3 groups, 2 groups with 5 teams and 1 group with 6 teams.

Teams play in a round robin format. the 3 top teams as well as the best 2nd team with most points qualifies for promotion playoff.

The 2 winners are promoted to the Vietnam First Division. No teams are relegated and no foreign players are permitted to play.

Group A
| Pos | Team | Pld | W | D | L | GF | GA | GD | Pts | Qualification |
|---|---|---|---|---|---|---|---|---|---|---|
| 1 | Quân Khu 5 FC | 10 | 6 | 0 | 4 | 16 | 11 | +5 | 18 | Play Off Position |
| 2 | Viettel FC | 10 | 5 | 1 | 4 | 10 | 9 | +1 | 16 | |
| 3 | Hà Tĩnh F.C | 10 | 4 | 3 | 3 | 13 | 11 | +2 | 15 | |
| 4 | Police People FC | 10 | 5 | 0 | 5 | 15 | 15 | 0 | 15 | |
| 5 | Hoang Tran Sinotruk | 10 | 3 | 2 | 5 | 7 | 13 | −6 | 11 | |
| 6 | Hoa Phat B | 10 | 2 | 4 | 4 | 7 | 9 | −2 | 10 | |

Group B
| Pos | Team | Pld | W | D | L | GF | GA | GD | Pts | Qualification |
|---|---|---|---|---|---|---|---|---|---|---|
| 1 | TDC Bình Dương | 8 | 4 | 4 | 0 | 10 | 4 | +6 | 16 | Play Off Position |
| 2 | Binh Thuan FC | 8 | 4 | 1 | 3 | 10 | 7 | +3 | 13 | |
| 3 | Lâm Đồng Đà Lạt | 8 | 2 | 5 | 1 | 5 | 4 | +1 | 11 | |
| 4 | Duoc Pham Can Gio | 8 | 1 | 4 | 3 | 3 | 8 | −5 | 7 | |
| 5 | Daklak FC | 8 | 1 | 2 | 5 | 2 | 7 | −5 | 5 | |

Group C
| Pos | Team | Pld | W | D | L | GF | GA | GD | Pts | Qualification |
|---|---|---|---|---|---|---|---|---|---|---|
| 1 | Kiên Giang FC | 10 | 8 | 2 | 0 | 22 | 9 | +13 | 26 | Play Off Position |
| 2 | Maseco Arirang | 10 | 4 | 2 | 4 | 8 | 12 | −4 | 14 | |
| 3 | Đồng Tâm Long An B | 10 | 3 | 3 | 4 | 13 | 12 | +1 | 12 | |
| 4 | Ca Mau FC | 10 | 4 | 0 | 6 | 7 | 12 | −5 | 12 | |
| 5 | Ho Chi Minh City Club B | 10 | 3 | 2 | 5 | 12 | 14 | −2 | 11 | |
| 6 | Vinh Long FC | 10 | 2 | 3 | 5 | 14 | 17 | −3 | 9 | |
