= 2017 Vietnamese National Football Third League =

Vietnamese National Football Third League
- Season: 2017
- Champions: Bà Rịa Vũng Tàu; Nam Định B Vĩnh Long; Quảng Ngãi
- Promoted: Bà Rịa Vũng Tàu; Nam Định B Vĩnh Long; Quảng Ngãi
- Relegated: None
- Matches played: 9
- Goals scored: 28 (3.11 per match)

The 2017 Vietnamese National Football Third League will be the 13th season of the Vietnamese National Football Third League. The season will begin on 3 October 2017 and finish on 9 October 2017.

== Rule ==
In this season, there are 8 teams divided geographically to 2 groups with 4 teams per group. The winner and runner-up of each group will promote to Second League. The teams play each other once in a centralised venue.

== Team changes ==
The following teams have changed division since the 2016 season.

=== To Vietnamese Third League ===
Relegated from Vietnamese Second League

- Vĩnh Long

Relegated from V.League 2

- Đồng Nai

New entry

- Công An Nhân Dân B
- Quảng Ngãi
- Kiên Giang
- Bà Rịa Vũng Tàu

=== From Vietnamese Third League ===
Promoted to Vietnamese Second League

- Phù Đổng
- Kon Tum

Withdrew

- Hà Nội C

== League table ==
=== Group A ===
All matches played in Hà Nội.

Pos	Team	Pld	W	D	L	GF	GA	GD	Pts	Qualification or relegation
1	Nam Định B (P)	2	2	0	0	4	2	+2	6	Promotion to Second League
2	Quảng Ngãi (P)	2	1	0	1	1	1	0	3	Promotion to Second League
3	Công An Nhân Dân B	2	0	0	2	2	4	−2	0	

Source: VFF
(P) Promoted

=== Group B ===
All matches played in Hồ Chí Minh City.

Pos	Team	Pld	W	D	L	GF	GA	GD	Pts	Qualification or relegation
1	Bà Rịa Vũng Tàu (P)	3	3	0	0	8	3	+5	9	Promotion to Second League
2	Vĩnh Long (P)	3	1	1	1	6	3	+3	4	Promotion to Second League
3	Đồng Nai	3	1	1	1	5	5	0	4	
4	Kiên Giang	3	0	0	3	2	10	−8	0	

Source: VFF
(P) Promoted

== Matches ==
=== Matchday 1 ===
==== Group A ====
3 October 2017
15:00

Công An Nhân Dân B	2–3	Nam Định B
Hà Văn Phương 22'; Đỗ Ngọc Trọng 82'	VFF	Đoàn Thế Chiến 47'; Hoàng Xuân Tân 52'; Đoàn Thanh Trường 54'

Hà Đông Stadium
Attendance: 100
Referee: Ngô Đức Trung

==== Group B ====
3 October 2017
15:00

Vĩnh Long	1–1	Đồng Nai
Trần Đình Trường 87'	VFF	Lý Hùng Thành 34'

Thành Long 1 Stadium
Referee: Nguyễn Minh Tuấn

3 October 2017
17:00

Bà Rịa Vũng Tàu	3–1	Kiên Giang
Lê Công Thịnh 41'; Võ Văn Tánh 45+2'; Lại Đức Anh 82'	VFF	Nguyễn Minh Chứa 52'

Thành Long 1 Stadium
Referee: Nguyễn Anh Vũ

=== Matchday 2 ===
==== Group A ====
6 October 2017
15:00

Nam Định B	1–0	Quảng Ngãi
Mai Xuân Quyết 24'	VFF

Hà Đông Stadium
Referee: Hà Văn Thức

==== Group B ====
6 October 2017
15:00

Đồng Nai	2–1	Kiên Giang
Lê Hữu Phát 10'; Võ Hoàng Minh Nhật 88'	VFF	Danh Cao Hoàng Phong 43'

Thành Long 1 Stadium
Referee: Trần Ngọc Nhớ

6 October 2017
17:00

Vĩnh Long	0–2	Bà Rịa Vũng Tàu
	VFF	Nguyễn Đoàn Trung Nhân 42'; Lại Đức Anh 62'

Thành Long 1 Stadium
Referee: Phan Văn Tuấn

=== Matchday 3 ===
==== Group A ====
9 October 2017
15:00

Quảng Ngãi	1–0	Công An Nhân Dân B
Nguyễn Minh Thuận 15'	VFF

Hà Đông Stadium
Attendance: 100
Referee: Hà Văn Thức

==== Group B ====
9 October 2017
15:00

Kiên Giang	0–5	Vĩnh Long
	VFF	Nguyễn Điệp Thành Khang 12', 45+1', 73', 79'; Tô Hoài Phong 56'

Thành Long 1 Stadium
Referee: Nguyễn Anh Vũ

9 October 2017
17:00

Bà Rịa Vũng Tàu	3–2	Đồng Nai
Lại Đức Anh 6'; Nguyễn Văn Việt 23'; Trần Đình Tiến 80'	VFF	Lê Ngọc Quang 83', 89'

Thành Long 1 Stadium
Referee: Phan Văn Tuấn

== See also ==
- 2017 V.League 1
- 2017 V.League 2
- 2017 Vietnamese National Football Second League
