= 2016 V.League 2 =

V.League 2
- Season: 2016
- Dates: 9 April – 20 August
- Champions: TP Hồ Chí Minh
- Relegated: Cà Mau
- Matches: 90
- Goals: 263 (2.92 per match)
- Top goalscorer: Hồ Sỹ Giáp (Bình Phước); Nguyễn Tuấn Anh (TP Hồ Chí Minh) (12 goals)
- Biggest home win: TP Hồ Chí Minh 7-0 Cà Mau
- Biggest away win: Cà Mau 0-8 Viettel
- Highest scoring: Cà Mau 0-8 Viettel (8 goals)
- Longest winning run: TP Hồ Chí Minh (9 games)
- Longest unbeaten run: TP Hồ Chí Minh (12 games)
- Longest winless run: Cà Mau (13 games)
- Longest losing run: Bình Phước (4 games)
- Highest attendance: 8,000
- Lowest attendance: 200
- Total attendance: 198,700
- Average attendance: 2,207
- All statistics correct as of 23 August 2016.

The 2016 V.League 2 (referred to as Kienlongbank V.League 2 for sponsorship reasons) was the 22nd season of V.League 2, Vietnam's second tier professional football league, which began on 9 April 2016 and ended on 20 August 2016.

== Changes from last season ==
=== Team changes ===
The following teams had changed division since the 2015 season.

==== To V.League 2 ====
Promoted from Vietnamese Second League

- Cà Mau
- Fico Tây Ninh
- Viettel

Relegated from V.League 1

- Đồng Nai

==== From V.League 2 ====
Relegated to Vietnamese Second League

- Công An Nhân Dân

Promoted to V.League 1

- Hà Nội (Sài Gòn)

=== Rule changes ===
In season 2016, clubs finishing second, third and fourth will play play-off matches for a place in the 2016 V.League 1 play-off match with the 13th-placed of 2016 V.League 1.

== Teams ==
=== Stadiums and locations ===
Locations of the 2016 V.League 2 teams

Team	Location	Stadium	Capacity
Bình Phước	Đồng Xoài	Bình Phước Stadium	10,000
Đắk Lắk	Buôn Ma Thuột	Buôn Ma Thuột Stadium	25,000
Cà Mau	Cà Mau	Cà Mau Stadium	9,000
Đồng Nai	Biên Hòa	Đồng Nai Stadium	25,000
Huế	Huế	Tự Do Stadium	25,000
Fico Tây Ninh	Tây Ninh	Tây Ninh Stadium	15,500
Nam Định	Nam Định	Thiên Trường Stadium	20,000
Phú Yên	Tuy Hòa	Phú Yên Stadium	5,000
TP Hồ Chí Minh	Hồ Chí Minh City	Thống Nhất Stadium	25,000
Viettel	Hà Nội	Hàng Đẫy Stadium	22,500

=== Personnel and kits ===
Team	Manager	Captain	Kit manufacturer	Shirt sponsor
Bình Phước	(Vietnam) Lê Thanh Xuân	(Vietnam) Đặng Trần Hoàng Nhựt		
Cà Mau	(Vietnam) Trần Công Minh	(Vietnam) Dương Ngọc Tiền		
Đắk Lắk	(Vietnam) Trần Phi Ái	(Vietnam) Huỳnh Văn Ly		
Đồng Nai	(Vietnam) Trần Bình Sự	(Vietnam) Nguyễn Đức Nhân	Mitre	
Fico Tây Ninh	(Vietnam) Mang Văn Xích	(Vietnam) Nguyễn Quốc Thanh		Xi măng Fico
Huế	(Vietnam) Nguyễn Đức Dũng	(Vietnam) Nguyễn Công Nhật		
Nam Định	(Vietnam) Nguyễn Thế Cường	(Vietnam) Nguyễn Hữu Định	Adidas (fake)	Mikado
Phú Yên	(Vietnam) Đinh Hồng Vinh	(Vietnam) Nguyễn Trương Minh Hoàng		
TP Hồ Chí Minh	(Vietnam) Lư Đình Tuấn	(Vietnam) Nguyễn Minh Trung		LS Group
Viettel	(Vietnam) Đinh Thế Nam	(Vietnam) Bùi Tiến Dũng	Mitre	BankPlus

== League table ==
Pos	Team	Pld	W	D	L	GF	GA	GD	Pts	Promotion or relegation
1	Hồ Chí Minh City (C, P)	18	12	3	3	38	15	+23	39	Promotion to 2017 V.League 1
2	Viettel	18	8	8	2	31	12	+19	32	Qualification to Play-off II
3	Nam Định	18	8	8	2	25	14	+11	32	Qualification to Play-off I
4	Đồng Nai	18	8	6	4	24	17	+7	30	Qualification to Play-off I
5	Fico Tây Ninh	18	6	7	5	23	25	−2	25	
6	Đắk Lắk	18	6	5	7	31	30	+1	23	
7	Huế	18	6	4	8	29	26	+3	22	
8	Bình Phước	18	4	4	10	29	36	−7	16	
9	Phú Yên	18	4	4	10	20	41	−21	16	
10	Cà Mau (R)	18	1	5	12	13	47	−34	8	Relegation to 2017 Vietnamese Second League

Source: VPF
Rules for classification: 1) Points; 2) Head-to-head points; 3) Head-to-head goal difference; 4) Head-to-head goal scored; 5) Head-to-head away goal scored; 6) Goal difference; 7) Goals scored; 8) Away goal scored; 9) Play-off.
(C) Champions; (P) Promoted; (R) Relegated

== Results ==
Home \ Away	BPC	CMA	DLK	DNA	FTN	HUE	NDI	PYE	HCM	VIE
Bình Phước		4–1	2–2	1–3	2–2	4–2	2–3	5–1	1–3	1–2
Cà Mau	0–1		1–2	1–1	1–1	1–1	3–3	1–0	0–3	0–8
Đắk Lắk	0–0	4–2		4–0	2–1	3–2	0–1	3–0	2–4	2–2
Đồng Nai	3–2	2–0	1–1		3–1	0–0	0–0	0–0	0–1	3–1
Fico Tây Ninh	1–0	2–1	2–0	2–1		4–3	0–0	2–2	2–0	1–1
Huế F.C.	3–1	2–0	3–0	2–1	2–0		2–2	3–0	0–1	1–1
Nam Định	3–0	2–0	2–2	0–1	2–0	1–0		1–0	0–1	1–1
Phú Yên	4–1	4–1	2–1	1–1	1–1	4–3	1–3		0–4	0–4
TP Hồ Chí Minh	2–1	7–0	3–2	0–3	1–1	2–0	1–1	5–0		0–2
Viettel	1–1	0–0	2–1	0–1	3–0	1–0	0–0	2–0	0–0	

Legend: Blue = home team win; Yellow = draw; Red = away team win.

=== Play-off match ===
==== Play-off I match ====
The team which finish 3rd faced the team which finish 4th. The winner earned entry into the play-off II match.

27 August 2016
17:00

Nam Định	3 – 2	Đồng Nai
Vũ Thế Vương 60'; Vũ Thành Công 61'; Phạm Ngọc Tuấn 76'	Report	Nguyễn Đức Nhân 81'; Nguyễn Hữu Tuấn 90'

Thiên Trường Stadium, Nam Định
Attendance: 6,000
Referee: Nguyễn Trung Kiên

Nam Định advanced to Play-off II match.

==== Play-off II match ====
The team which finish 2nd faced the winner of play-off I match. The winner earned entry into the play-off match with the 13th-placed team of 2016 V.League 1

31 August 2016
17:00

Viettel	3 – 2	Nam Định
Đàm Tiến Dũng 9'; Bùi Duy Thường 52'; Nguyễn Trọng Đại 68'	Report	Đinh Văn Ta 48' (pen.); Nguyễn Hữu Định 78' (pen.)

Hàng Đẫy Stadium, Hà Nội
Attendance: 2,000
Referee: Nguyễn Văn Kiên

Viettel advanced to Play-off match with V.League 1 team.

== Positions by round ==
Team ╲ Round	1	2	3	4	5	6	7	8	9	10	11	12	13	14	15	16	17	18
Bình Phước	1	4	5	8	9	9	9	9	9	9	9	9	9	9	9	9	8	8
Cà Mau	8	8	10	10	10	10	10	10	10	10	10	10	10	10	10	10	10	10
Đắk Lắk	3	10	8	6	8	7	8	7	8	8	8	8	7	7	7	6	6	6
Đồng Nai	6	9	9	9	6	8	6	6	5	5	4	4	4	3	3	2	2	4
Fico Tây Ninh	4	6	6	5	5	5	3	4	4	4	5	5	5	5	5	5	5	5
Huế F.C.	10	5	7	4	2	4	5	5	6	7	6	6	6	6	6	7	7	7
Nam Định	2	1	1	1	1	1	1	1	2	2	2	2	3	2	2	3	4	3
Phú Yên	9	3	3	7	7	6	7	8	7	6	7	7	8	8	8	8	9	9
TP Hồ Chí Minh	5	2	4	2	4	3	2	2	1	1	1	1	1	1	1	1	1	1
Viettel	7	7	2	3	3	2	4	3	3	3	3	3	2	4	4	4	3	2

Source: Vietnam Professional Football
= Winner; Promoted to V.League 1; = Play-off; = Relegate to Second League

== Season statistics ==
As of 23 August 2016

=== Top scorers ===
Rank	Player	Club	Goals
1	(Vietnam) Hồ Sỹ Giáp	Bình Phước	12
1	(Vietnam) Nguyễn Tuấn Anh	TP Hồ Chí Minh	12
3	(Vietnam) Võ Lý	Huế	10
3	(Vietnam) Hoàng Ngọc Hùng	Fico Tây Ninh	10
5	(Vietnam) Bùi Duy Thường	Viettel	9

=== Own goals ===
Player	Club	Against	Round
(Vietnam) Bùi Ngọc Tín	Đắk Lắk	Huế	5
(Vietnam) Phạm Hoàng Đức	Phú Yên	Đắk Lắk	7
(Vietnam) Bùi Xuân Bình	Phú Yên	Huế	16

=== Hattrick ===
Player	For	Against	Result	Date
(Vietnam) Hồ Sỹ Giáp	Bình Phước	Huế	4–2	9 April 2016
(Vietnam) Ngô Xuân Toàn	Phú Yên	Bình Phước	4–1	16 April 2016
(Vietnam) Võ Lý	Huế	Phú Yên	3–0	30 April 2016
(Vietnam) Lê Đức Tài	Đồng Nai	Viettel	3–1	17 May 2016
(Vietnam) Nguyễn Hữu Sơn	Nam Định	Bình Phước	3–2	2 July 2016
(Vietnam) Nguyễn Tuấn Anh	TP Hồ Chí Minh	Cà Mau	7–0	13 August 2016

== See also ==
- 2016 V.League 1
- 2016 Vietnamese National Football Second League
- 2016 Vietnamese National Football Third League
