= Dinh Huong Phu Nhuan =

Vietnamese football club

Định Hướng Phú Nhuận FC
- Full name: Câu lạc bộ bóng đá Thành phố Thủ Đức (Thủ Đức City Football Club)
- Founded: 2013; 13 years ago as Định Hướng Advertising Company FC
- Dissolved: August 2024; 2 years ago
- Ground: Thống Nhất Stadium, Hồ Chí Minh City, Vietnam
- Capacity: 15,000
- Chairman: Nguyễn Văn Trung
- Head coach: Lưu Quốc Tân
- League: V.League 2
- 2024: Vietnamese Second Division, play-off winner (promoted)
- Website: https://www.facebook.com/dinhuongfc
Home colours	Away colours

Định Hướng Phú Nhuận Football Club (Vietnamese: Câu lạc bộ bóng đá Định Hướng Phú Nhuận), was a Vietnamese football club based in Hồ Chí Minh City. The club played its home matches at the 15,000-capacity Thống Nhất Stadium. They last played in the V.League 2, after winning the promotion play-off game in the 2024 Vietnamese Second Division.

== History ==
In 2013, Định Hướng Football Club was established in Phú Nhuận district, Hồ Chí Minh City under the name Định Hướng Advertising Company FC (Công ty Quảng Cáo Định Hướng) and operated as an amateur sports team. They regularly participated in friendly competitions in Hồ Chí Minh City and southern Vietnam under the name Kharkiv FC and had several achievements. In 2023, they registered to participate in the Vietnamese Third Division, the fourth tier in the Vietnamese football system and changed the club's name to Định Hướng Phú Nhuận.

The club managed to sign several veterans who had many playing experiences in V.League 1 and international level such as Huỳnh Kesley Alves and twin brothers Hoàng Danh Ngọc, Hoàng Nhật Nam. In their first season in the Vietnamese football system, the club topped their group in the Third Division and won a promotion to the Second Division for the 2024 season. In the following season, the club continued its good form after finishing first in their group in the Second Division, thus qualified for the promotion play-off game. There, they defeated Kon Tum 2–0 and promoted to the 2024–25 V.League 2. Following their promotion, it was given that the club would be transferred to the Thủ Đức People's Committee and placed under their management, thus changed the club's name to Thủ Đức City FC. However, the deal failed and the club remained under the ownership of Định Hướng Advertising company, who chose to dissolve it.

== Coaching staff ==
Position	Name
Chairman	(Vietnam) Nguyễn Văn Trung
Head coach	(Vietnam) Lưu Quốc Tân
Assistant coach	(Vietnam) Nguyễn Ngọc Linh (Vietnam) Phan Thanh Giang
Sporting director	(Vietnam) Hoàng Nhật Nam

== Current squad ==
As of 30 March 2024

Note: Flags indicate national team as defined under FIFA eligibility rules; some limited exceptions apply. Players may hold more than one non-FIFA nationality.

No.	Pos.	Nation	Player
2	DF	VIE	Nguyễn Anh Tài
3	DF	VIE	Trịnh Nguyễn Mai Tài Lộc
5	DF	VIE	Bùi Hoàng Mỹ
6	DF	VIE	Trần Minh Lợi
7	FW	VIE	Cao Tấn Hoài
9	FW	VIE	Bùi Văn Hưng
10	MF	VIE	Hoàng Danh Ngọc
11	MF	VIE	Hà Vũ Em
14	DF	VIE	Huỳnh Công Hậu
15	DF	VIE	Ngô Minh Quang
17	MF	VIE	Phạm Ngô Tấn Tài
18	FW	VIE	Kha Tấn Tài
21	MF	VIE	Dương Vĩnh Khang

No.	Pos.	Nation	Player
22	MF	VIE	Nguyễn Tuấn Đạt
24	MF	VIE	Phạm Hồng Sơn
25	GK	VIE	Lê Văn Hưng
30	DF	VIE	Bùi Xuân Quý
35	GK	VIE	Nguyễn Hoàng Minh Duy
71	DF	VIE	Nguyễn Công Thành
76	MF	VIE	Nguyễn Mạnh Huy
77	MF	VIE	Nguyễn Minh Phương
80	FW	VIE	Cẩm Bá Tuấn
86	MF	VIE	Nguyễn Xuân Hướng
88	DF	VIE	Huỳnh Hiếu
96	GK	VIE	Châu Hoài Thanh
99	MF	VIE	Võ Hoàng Minh Tân
