= Bùi Tiến Dũng (footballer, born 1995) =

Vietnamese footballer

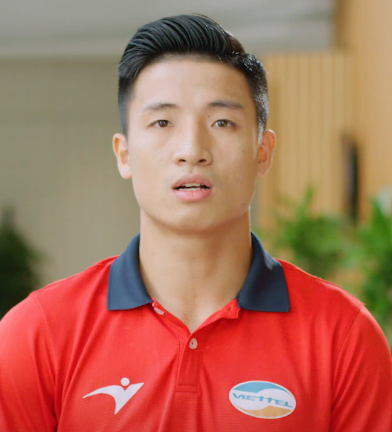
- Tiến Dũng in 2020

Personal information
- Full name: Bùi Tiến Dũng
- Date of birth: 2 October 1995 (age 31)
- Place of birth: Đức Thọ, Hà Tĩnh, Vietnam
- Height: 1.76 m (5 ft 9 in)
- Position: Centre-back

Team information
- Current team: Thể Công -Viettel
- Number: 4

Youth career
- 2008: QK4
- 2009–2014: Viettel

Senior career*
| Years | Team | Apps | (Gls) |
| 2014– | Thể Công-Viettel | 178 | (17) |
| 2015 | → Hoàng Anh Gia Lai (loan) | 14 | (0) |

International career^{‡}
| 2014–2015 | Vietnam U19 | 12 | (2) |
| 2015–2018 | Vietnam U23 | 32 | (0) |
| 2015– | Vietnam | 62 | (1) |
Medal record
Men's football
Representing Vietnam
SEA Games
| Bronze medal – third place | Singapore 2015 | Team |
AFC U-23 Championship
| Runner-up | China 2018 |
ASEAN Championship
| Winner | ASEAN 2018 | Team |
| Runner-up | ASEAN 2022 | Team |
| Winner | ASEAN 2024 | Team |
- * Club domestic league appearances and goals as of 7 June 2026 ‡ National team caps and goals as of 19 November 2025

Bùi Tiến Dũng (IPA: [ɓù:j tiə̌n zŭˀŋm], born 2 October 1995) is a Vietnamese professional footballer who plays as a centre back for V.League 1 club Viettel and the Vietnam national team.

== International career ==
Tiến Dũng made his international debut against Cambodia on November 27, 2016. Coming on as a substitute in their 2–1 win.

Dũng played for Vietnam in the 2018 AFC U-23 Championship. In the quarter-final against Iraq, which ended 3–3 after 120 minutes, Dũng succeeded in the final penalty, leading Vietnam to the semi-final. Vietnam later advanced to the final, where they lost 1–2 to Uzbekistan.

In the Asian Games 2018 in Palembang, Dũng was the one who made the pass from the home field, eventually assisting Nguyễn Văn Toàn's decisive goal against Syria on August 27.

Bùi Tiến Dũng was also in Vietnam squad in the AFF Suzuki Cup 2018, where they ultimately lifted the trophy after defeating Malaysia 3–2 on aggregate.

In the 2019 AFC Asian Cup's round of 16 against Jordan, Dũng successfully delivered the decisive penalty kick, helping Vietnam to win 4–2 in the penalty shoots-out.

== Career statistics ==
=== Club ===
As of match played 7 June 2026

Appearances and goals by club, season and competition
| Club | Season | League | | | Cup | | Continental | | Other | | Total | |
| Club | Season | Division | Apps | Goals | Apps | Goals | Apps | Goals | Apps | Goals | Apps | Goals |
|---|---|---|---|---|---|---|---|---|---|---|---|---|
| Hoang Anh Gia Lai | 2015 | V.League 1 | 14 | 0 | 1 | 0 | — | | — | | 15 | 0 |
| Viettel FC | 2016 | V.League 2 | 17 | 3 | 1 | 0 | — | | 1 (Note: Appearances in V.League 1 relegation/promotion play-off) | 0 | 19 | 3 |
| Viettel FC | 2017 | V.League 2 | 9 | 1 | 0 | 0 | — | | — | | 9 | 1 |
| Viettel FC | 2018 | V.League 2 | 15 | 2 | 1 | 0 | — | | — | | 16 | 2 |
| Viettel FC | 2019 | V.League 1 | 24 | 3 | 0 | 0 | — | | — | | 24 | 3 |
| Viettel FC | 2020 | V.League 1 | 19 | 0 | 5 | 1 | — | | — | | 24 | 1 |
| Viettel FC | 2021 | V.League 1 | 11 | 1 | 0 | 0 | 4 (Note: Appearances in AFC Champions League) | 1 | 0 | 0 | 15 | 2 |
| Viettel FC | 2022 | V.League 1 | 13 | 1 | 1 | 0 | 0 | 0 | — | | 14 | 1 |
| Viettel FC | 2023 | V.League 1 | 15 | 2 | 4 | 0 | — | | — | | 19 | 2 |
| Viettel FC | 2023–24 | V.League 1 | 13 | 1 | 0 | 0 | — | | — | | 13 | 1 |
| Viettel FC | Total | | 136 | 14 | 12 | 1 | 4 | 1 | 1 | 0 | 153 | 16 |
| Total career | | | 150 | 14 | 13 | 1 | 4 | 1 | 1 | 0 | 168 | 16 |

=== International ===
As of match played 15 December 2024

Appearances and goals by national team and year
| National team | Year | Apps | Goals |
|---|---|---|---|
| Vietnam | 2015 | 1 | 0 |
| Vietnam | 2016 | 2 | 0 |
| Vietnam | 2017 | 6 | 0 |
| Vietnam | 2018 | 3 | 0 |
| Vietnam | 2019 | 12 | 0 |
| Vietnam | 2021 | 14 | 1 |
| Vietnam | 2022 | 6 | 0 |
| Vietnam | 2023 | 3 | 0 |
| Vietnam | 2024 | 5 | 0 |
| Total | | 52 | 1 |

As of match played 13 January 2023. Vietnam score listed first, score column indicates score after each Tiến Dũng goal.

List of international goals scored by Bùi Tiến Dũng
| No. | Date | Venue | Opponent | Score | Result | Competition |
|---|---|---|---|---|---|---|
| 1 | 19 December 2021 | Bishan Stadium, Bishan, Singapore | Cambodia | 3–0 | 4–0 | 2020 AFF Championship |

== Honours ==
Viettel

- V.League 1: 2020
- V.League 2: 2018

Vietnam U23/Olympic

- VFF Cup: 2018

Vietnam

- ASEAN Championship: 2018, 2024
- VFF Cup: 2022

Individual

- ASEAN Championship All-Star XI: 2024
- V.League 1 Team of the Season: 2019, 2024–25
