= Vietnamese Football League Second Division =

- Organising body: Vietnam Football Federation (VFF)
- Founded: 2000; 26 years ago
- Country: Vietnam
- Confederation: AFC
- Number of clubs: 15
- Level on pyramid: 3
- Promotion to: V.League 2
- Relegation to: Third Division
- Domestic cup: Vietnamese Cup
- Current champions: Hà Nội B (1st title); Huế (2nd title)
- Most championships: Bà Rịa Vũng Tàu; Công An Nhân Dân; Huế; Phù Đổng; Quảng Nam; Tây Ninh (2 titles each)
- Website: vff.org.vn
- Current: 2026 Vietnamese Football League Second Division

The Vietnamese Football League Second Division (Vietnamese: Giải bóng đá hạng Nhì quốc gia, lit. 'National Second Division Football League'), also known as Vietnamese Second Divistion (Vietnamese: Giải hạng Nhì quốc gia, lit. 'National Second Division') is the third tier professional association football league in Vietnam, controlled by the Vietnam Football Federation.

== History ==
A national third tier of Vietnamese association football was first established along with its professionalization in 1995. Among the 10 original clubs of the third tier included the forerunners to Thanh Hóa, Cần Thơ, Đồng Nai, Cà Mau and Lâm Đồng. But after a number of clubs were lost for various reasons – some were promoted to V.League and the others folded – the league contracted the second division in 1997 and continued with the single second-tier division.

The third-tier football was reintroduced in 2000 upon creation of fully professional V.League 2. But despite its officially amateur status the league quickly became de facto semi-professional, serving as the cradle of the future V. League members. Since the establishment of associate membership system in 2006 the number of professional clubs holding or actively seeking for this status has grown steadily and reached its peak in 2010 season when 6 full members and 2 former candidates made up to almost half of the league's 18 teams. Through the course of the season this number grew even bigger, to 15 full associate members that formed the core of V.League 3.

== Current season ==
14 teams compete in the 2026 season, split into two groups.

Group A

Team	Location	Stadium	Capacity
Cong An Hanoi B	Hà Nội	Thanh Trì Stadium	4,000
Hanoi FC B	Hà Nội	Thanh Trì Stadium	4,000
Ha Tinh	Hà Tĩnh	Hà Tĩnh Stadium	10,000
Hue FC	Huế	Tự Do Stadium	25,000
Phu Dong	Bắc Ninh	Từ Sơn Stadium	5,000
PVF	Hưng Yên	PVF Stadium	3,600
SHB Da Nang B	Đà Nẵng	Tam Kỳ Stadium	15,000

Group B

Team	Location	Stadium	Capacity
Dak Lak FC	Đắk Lắk	Buôn Ma Thuột Stadium	20,000
Lam Dong FC	Lâm Đồng	Đà Lạt Stadium	20,000
Mekong Can Tho	Cần Thơ	Cần Thơ Stadium	30,000
Quang Ngai FC	Quảng Ngãi	Quảng Ngãi Stadium	12,000
Tay Ninh FC	Tây Ninh	Tây Ninh Province Sports Training and Competition Center	500
Truong Giang-Gia Dinh	Hồ Chí Minh City	Tân Hiệp Stadium	1,000
Vinh Long FC	Vĩnh Long	Vĩnh Long Stadium	10,000

== Winners ==
Season	Winners	Runners-up
2000	Hải Quan	Bình Định
2001	Thanh Hóa	Cần Thơ
2002	Bưu Điện; Đắk Lắk	An Giang; Quân Khu 5
2003	Quảng Nam	Khải Hoàn Hotel
2004	Khánh Hòa	Strata Đồng Nai
2005	Quân Khu 5	Tây Ninh
2006	Thành Nghĩa Dung Quất Quảng Ngãi	Than Quảng Ninh
2007	Quân Khu 7	T&T Hà Nội
2008	Quảng Nam	Hải An Sài Gòn United
2009	TDC Bình Dương	Viettel
2010	Nguyễn Hoàng Kiên Giang	Hòa Phát V&V
2011	SHB Đà Nẵng B	Lâm Đồng
2012	Bà Rịa-Vũng Tàu	Khatoco Khánh Hòa B
2013	Huế; Sanna Khánh Hòa; Tây Ninh	Đắk Lắk; Hồ Chí Minh City
2014	Bình Phước; Công An Nhân Dân; Nam Định; Phú Yên	Kon Tum; Tiền Giang; Vĩnh Long; Long An B
2015	Fico Cement Tây Ninh; Viettel	Cà Mau
2016	PVF	Bình Định
2017	Công An Nhân Dân; Bình Định	Hà Nội B
2018	An Giang; Phù Đổng	Phố Hiến
2019	Bà Rịa-Vũng Tàu	Hà Nội B
2020	Phù Đổng; Phú Thọ	Gia Định
2021	Season cancelled	
2022	Bình Thuận; Hoà Bình	Hải Nam Vĩnh Yên; Đồng Nai
2023	Đồng Nai; Đồng Tháp	Đắk Lắk; SHB Đà Nẵng B
2024	Định Hướng Phú Nhuận; Hồ Chí Minh City Youth	Kon Tum; Bắc Ninh
2025	Quảng Ninh; Văn Hiến University	Bắc Ninh; Gia Định
2026	Hà Nội B Huế	Lâm Đồng
