= Quang Ngai FC (2025) =

Vietnamese football club

- Full name: Câu lạc bộ bóng đá Quảng Ngãi (Quảng Ngãi Football Club)
- Nickname: Bầy dê núi (Mountain Goats)
- Founded: 1992 (then dissolved in 2015); 2016 (then dissolved in 2022); 2022; 4 years ago
- Ground: Quảng Ngãi Stadium
- Capacity: 12,000
- Chairman: Trần Văn Quỳnh
- Manager: Chu Ngọc Cảnh
- League: Vietnamese Second Division
- 2026: Vietnamese Second Division, 3rd of 7 (Group B)
- Website: facebook.com
Home colours	Away colours

Quảng Ngãi Football Club (Vietnamese: Câu lạc bộ bóng đá Quảng Ngãi), formerly known as Kon Tum Football Club (Vietnamese: Câu lạc bộ bóng đá Kon Tum) is a Vietnamese football club based in Quảng Ngãi. The club plays its home matches at the 12,000-capacity Quảng Ngãi Stadium. They currently play in the Vietnamese Second Division.

== History ==
=== Early years and first dissolution ===
The forerunner of Kon Tum was the Gia Lai – Kon Tum football team, founded in 1976. Despite being an amateur team, the team also once won the A2 championship, the second highest division of the country. The incarnation of the Kon Tum Football Club came into being in 1992 when the club was split into Gia Lai FC and Kon Tum FC.

From its establishment until 1999, Kon Tum competed in the National A2 League, the second division of the country. In 2000, when the football league system in Vietnam was reorganized, Kon Tum played in the Second Division (third tier) from 2000 to 2004 before being relegated to the Third Division. From 2005 to 2013, Kon Tum was playing in the fourth tier of the country but failed to gain a promotion due to the club's limited financial condition. The turning point was in the 2013 season when Kon Tum surpass regional rivals Lâm Đồng and ranked first in their group, thus returning to the a promotion to the Second Division after 10 years.

In the first season back in the Second Division, Kon Tum continued to perform well and ranked second in their group and qualified to the promotion play-off game. However, the team lost with a score of 0–4 to Bình Phước and missed the chance to promote to the V.League 2.

In the following season, Kon Tum finished at the bottom of the group and got relegated. On 25 December 2015, the executive committee of the Vietnam Football Federation (VFF) announced the dissolution the of Kon Tum Football Club due to the lack of fund to the club.

=== Reformation, second dissolution and second reformation ===
In 2016, Kon Tum club returned and competed in the Vietnamese Third Division. The club's home stadium was the 11,000-capacity Kon Tum Stadium. They ranked second in their group and promoted to the 2017 Second Division. They remained in the league until 2022 where Kon Tum suffered a relegation to the Third Division. After the unsuccessful season, the club dissolved for the second time.

A new Kon Tum FC was created, being named Vị Trí Vàng Kon Tum for sponsorship reasons. The club competed in the 2023 Vietnamese Third Division and finished first of their group, thus making their return the Second Division. Following the promotion, the club changed its name back to the current Kon Tum FC. After their return to the Second Division, Kon Tum finished second in their group in the 2024 season and qualified to the promotion play-off game. There, they were defeated 0–2 by Định Hướng and again failed to promote to the V.League 2.

=== Name change to Quảng Ngãi ===
On 4 September 2025, following the incorporation of Kon Tum province into Quảng Ngãi province, Kon Tum FC changed their name to Quảng Ngãi FC, updated their logo and club colors from green to blue, and moved to Quảng Ngãi Stadium.

== Coaching staff ==
Position	Name
Chairman	(Vietnam) Trần Văn Quỳnh
Technical director	(Vietnam) Trần Minh Chiến
Head coach	(Vietnam) Chu Ngọc Cảnh
Goalkeeper coach	(Vietnam) Trần Đức Cường

== Current squad ==
As of 30 March 2026

Note: Flags indicate national team as defined under FIFA eligibility rules; some limited exceptions apply. Players may hold more than one non-FIFA nationality.

No.	Pos.	Nation	Player
1	GK	VIE	Trần Văn Đạt (on loan from Sông Lam Nghệ An)
2	DF	VIE	Nguyễn Đức Tùng
5	DF	VIE	Trần Đông Thức (on loan from Sông Lam Nghệ An)
6	MF	VIE	Bạch Trọng Dương (on loan from Sông Lam Nghệ An)
8	MF	VIE	Phạm Nguyễn Quốc Trung (on loan from Sông Lam Nghệ An)
9	MF	VIE	Thái Bảo Trung
10	FW	VIE	Trần Quốc Hòa (on loan from Sông Lam Nghệ An)
11	FW	VIE	Cao Hoàng Đạt
12	FW	VIE	Phùng Văn Nam (on loan from Sông Lam Nghệ An)
14	DF	VIE	Đặng Thanh Bình (on loan from Thể Công-Viettel)
15	MF	VIE	Trần Gia Kiên
16	MF	VIE	Nguyễn Ngọc Cả
17	DF	VIE	Hồ Quốc Thông (on loan from Sông Lam Nghệ An)
18	MF	VIE	Nguyễn Trọng Đại Nghĩa

No.	Pos.	Nation	Player
19	FW	VIE	Hồ Hữu Nhật Sang (on loan from Sông Lam Nghệ An)
20	FW	VIE	Nguyễn Thế Thắng
21	MF	VIE	Nguyễn Văn Nguyên
22	FW	VIE	Lê Quang Linh (on loan from Sông Lam Nghệ An)
23	DF	VIE	Trần Phúc Tá (on loan from Sông Lam Nghệ An)
25	GK	VIE	Lâm Lê Phước Tiến Dũng
26	DF	VIE	Trần Quốc Thành
28	DF	VIE	Nguyễn Duy Hoàng
29	MF	VIE	Trần Nguyên Khải
34	DF	VIE	Hồ Văn Dũng
39	FW	VIE	Nguyễn Tuấn Khanh (on loan from Hoàng Anh Gia Lai)
77	DF	VIE	Nguyễn Anh Dũng
—	GK	VIE	Nguyễn Gia Bảo
—	DF	VIE	Bùi Quốc Huy
