= Sara Vietnam =

Information technology company from Vietnam

- Industry: Information technology
- Predecessor: Sara Center; National Information Technology Training and Development JSC
- Founded: 2002 (Sara Vietnam claimed); 16 June 2003
- Headquarters: Hanoi, Vietnam
- Key people: Trần Khắc Hùng (former chairman)
- Number of employees: 80 (2008)
- Website: srb.vn

Sara Vietnam (Vietnamese: Sara Việt Nam), formally Sara Vietnam Joint Stock Company (Vietnamese: Công ty cổ phần Tập đoàn Sara), is a Vietnamese company, specialized in information technology.

== History ==
The precursor of Sara Vietnam was the National Information Technology Training and Development Joint Stock Company (Công ty Cổ phần Đào tạo và Phát triển Công nghệ thông tin Quốc gia), which was founded on 16 June 2003. However, Sara Vietnam claims it was founded in 2002 as Sara Center, a learning center that teaches information technology and foreign language skills.

On 17 March 2008, Sara Vietnam was listed at the Hanoi Stock Exchange. Due to losses in business, Sara Vietnam's share was relegated to UpCoM at an unknown date.

As of 2008, Sara Vietnam has 80 employees.

As of 2016, the headquarter of Sara Vietnam is in Hoàng Mai district, Hanoi.

== Operations and businesses ==
=== Operations ===
The company's activities include information technology research and software development, as well as media, education and real estate. According to its website, the overall work of the company is divided into four "fields of action": Software, media, training and real estate investment.

In 2008, Sara Vietnam conducted a feasibility study on the possibilities of mobile marketing in Vietnam, supported by the Danish B2B Programme.

=== Businesses ===
==== Sara Window ====
Sara Vietnam involves in Sara Window, a constructions materials manufacturing company that makes windows, doors and room partitions.

==== University ====
In 2014, Sara Vietnam invested to Đông Đô University, a Vietnamese private university.

The company's management and education departments are working with the Ministry of Education towards the opening of SIBT University (Sara International Business Technology University), in Lai Châu Province of the northwest Vietnam.

==== Shareholders ====
In February 2007, Japanese company CPR bought 15% Sara Vietnam's shares.

== Football club ==
Sara Thành Vinh
- Full name: Sara Thành Vinh Football Club
- Founded: 2005
- Dissolved: 2010
- Ground: Vinh Stadium, Nghệ An province, Vietnam
- Capacity: 18,000
- Website: Official website (archived on 26 October 2007)

Sara Vietnam formerly operated a football club, named Sara Thành Vinh, which formerly competed in Vietnamese Football League Second Division.

During its existence, Sara Thành Vinh chose Vinh Stadium as their home stadium.

=== History ===
The team was founded in 2005, as Sara Nghệ An. During the 2005 National Football League Third Division, the team was renamed as Sara Thành Vinh. After a successful 2005 season, the team was promoted to Second Division in 2006.

In the 2006 Second Division football season, some players of Sara Thành Vinh were alleged to be engaged in match fixing with Than Quang Ninh FC.

Sara Thành Vinh entered the 2008 Second Division football season as Sara Window. In 2009, Sara Window was renamed again and competed as Hoàng Trần Sinotruk.

Hoàng Trần Sinotruk was initially announced to compete in 2010 Vietnamese National Football Second League as Hoàng Trần Football Club, but later withdrew.
