= Ca Mau FC =

Cà Mau
- Full name: Câu lạc bộ bóng đá Cà Mau (Cà Mau Football Club)
- Nickname: The Cape Troopers (Đoàn quân Đất Mũi)
- Short name: Cà Mau
- Founded: 2006
- Dissolved: 2018
- Ground: Cà Mau Stadium, Cà Mau City, Cà Mau Province
- Capacity: 6,000
- Owner(s): Cà Mau Department of Culture, Sports and Tourism
- Manager: (Vietnam) Trần Công Minh
- League: Dissolved
- 2017: Second Division, 7th, Group B
Home colours	Away colours

Cà Mau Football Club (Vietnamese: Câu lạc bộ bóng đá Cà Mau) was a Vietnamese football club based in Cà Mau City, Cà Mau Province. The club was founded in 2006 and spent most of its history competing in the Vietnamese Second Division.

The club's most notable achievement was earning promotion to the V.League 2 in 2015. However, following a tumultuous 2016 season marked by financial difficulties and subsequent relegation, the club competed for one final season in the Second Division before dissolving in 2018.

== History ==
=== Second Division period (2006–2014) ===
Founded in 2006, Cà Mau Football Club spent the majority of its history competing in the Vietnamese Second Division. Despite frequently finishing in the top 3 of their group (in 2006, 2007, 2008, 2012, and 2014), the team was unable to secure promotion during this period.

=== Promotion to V.League 2 (2015) ===
In the 2015 Second Division season, Cà Mau finished second in Group B, earning a spot in the promotion play-off final. In the play-off match on July 3, 2015, at Nha Trang Stadium, Cà Mau faced Bình Định. After conceding a goal in the 73rd minute, Nguyễn Thanh Lợi equalized for Cà Mau in the 80th minute, forcing the match to a penalty shoot-out. Cà Mau won 4–2 on penalties, securing promotion to the V.League 2 (Vietnamese First Division) for the first time in their history.

=== Withdrawal controversy and 2016 season ===
The club's promotion was immediately jeopardized by financial issues. On October 20, 2015, the Cà Mau Sports Center sent an official letter to the Vietnam Football Federation (VFF) requesting to withdraw from the 2016 V.League 2 due to a lack of funding (estimated 5-12 billion VND required). The VFF considered promoting Bình Định (the team Cà Mau had defeated in the play-off) as their replacement.

However, in November 2015, after reportedly securing a sponsor, Cà Mau reversed their decision and requested to be reinstated. Following intervention from VPF chairman Võ Quốc Thắng, the VFF approved Cà Mau's participation in December 2015, conditional on the club upgrading Cà Mau Stadium (at a cost of 4.6 billion VND). The club also appointed former national player Trần Công Minh as head coach.

The 2016 V.League 2 season was disastrous for Cà Mau. The financial situation remained dire, with the club falling behind on salary and bonus payments. Players reportedly received only 200,000 VND per day for food before matches. The team's performance suffered, managing only one win the entire season (against Đắk Lắk in the first round). They endured heavy defeats, including a 0–7 loss to TP.HCM and a 0–8 loss to Viettel. Cà Mau finished last in the table with 8 points (1 win, 5 draws, 12 losses) and were relegated back to the Second Division.

=== Dissolution (2017–2018) ===
The team played its final season in the 2017 Second Division, finishing 7th out of 8 teams in Group B, avoiding relegation.

However, in 2018, the club was officially dissolved due to a persistent lack of funding. Their spot in the 2018 Second Division was transferred to Sanatech Khánh Hòa (later renamed Fishan Khánh Hòa).

== Stadium ==
The club's home ground was Cà Mau Stadium, located in Cà Mau City. The stadium has a capacity of approximately 6,000 spectators. To meet the requirements for competing in the 2016 V.League 2, the stadium underwent a 4.6 billion VND renovation and upgrade in late 2015.

== 2016 season squad ==
Squad for the 2016 V.League 2 season.

Note: Flags indicate national team as defined under FIFA eligibility rules; some limited exceptions apply. Players may hold more than one non-FIFA nationality.

No.	Pos.	Nation	Player
1	GK	VIE	Trần Chí Tâm
2	DF	VIE	Lê Minh Cảnh
3	DF	VIE	Lý Hoàng Duy
4	DF	VIE	Trương Minh Chí
5	DF	VIE	Trần Văn Vinh
6	MF	VIE	Huỳnh Văn Cường
7	DF	VIE	Nguyễn Trung Hiếu
8	DF	VIE	Dương Ngọc Tiền
9	FW	VIE	Võ Trí Thiện
10	FW	VIE	Lê Ngọc Thiên Ân
11	DF	VIE	Huỳnh Tấn Kiệt
12	DF	VIE	Lê Nguyễn Thành Trung
13	MF	VIE	Phan Kim Long
14	MF	VIE	Vũ Hữu Có
15	DF	VIE	Nguyễn Ngô Như Ngà
16	FW	VIE	Bùi Ngọc Thịnh
17	FW	VIE	Nguyễn Đình Quý

No.	Pos.	Nation	Player
18	MF	VIE	Trần Tuấn Vũ
19	MF	VIE	Nguyễn Thanh Lợi
20	MF	VIE	Lâm Minh Nghiệm
21	MF	VIE	Nguyễn Hoàng Khang
22	FW	VIE	Nguyễn Đăng Phương
23	FW	VIE	Nguyễn Phước Hiếu
24	MF	VIE	Lê Tấn Phi
25	MF	VIE	Trần Phi Hà
26	GK	VIE	Phan Trường Chinh
27	GK	VIE	Nguyễn Văn Khoa
28	FW	VIE	Trần Công Bình
31	GK	VIE	Lê Văn Tưởng
32	GK	VIE	Nguyễn Sơn Hảo
33	FW	VIE	Nguyễn Ngọc Điểu
34	MF	VIE	Bùi Văn Sang
35	DF	VIE	Phan Thanh Giang
37	GK	VIE	Bùi Phương Duy

== League history ==
Season	League	Position	Outcome	Notes
2017	Second Division	7th, Group B	Safe	Final season
2016	V.League 2	10th	Relegated	
2015	Second Division	2nd, Group B	Won Play-off	Promoted to V.League 2
2014	Second Division	3rd, Group D	Safe	
2013	Second Division	3rd, Group C	Safe	
2012	Second Division	2nd, Group C	Safe	
2011	Second Division	3rd, Group C	Safe	
2010	Second Division	3rd, Group C	Safe	
2009	Second Division	4th, Group C	Safe	
2008	Second Division	2nd, Group C	Safe	
2007	2007 Second Division	2nd, Group C	Safe	
2006	2006 Second Division	2nd, Group C	Safe	

== Other achievements ==
- Tien Giang Television Cup (THTG Cup):
  - Runners-up (1): 2013
  - Group stage (1): 2012

== Sponsorship ==
- 2007–2008: Khatoco

== Managerial history ==
- (Vietnam) Dương Hữu Cường (2014?–2015)
- (Vietnam) Trần Công Minh (Dec 2015–2016)
- (Vietnam) Lai Hồng Vân (2016 – Technical Director)
