= 2017 Vietnamese National Football Second League =

Vietnamese National Football Second League
- Season: 2017
- Promoted: Công An Nhân Dân; Bình Định; Hà Nội B
- Relegated: Sanatech Khách Hòa
- Matches played: 119
- Goals scored: 345 (2.9 per match)
- Biggest home win: Hà Nội B 8-0 Long An B
- Biggest away win: Phù Đổng 0-4 Công An Nhân Dân
- Highest scoring: Viettel B 7-2 Sanatech Khách Hòa (9 goals)
- Longest winning run: Hà Nội B (9)
- Longest unbeaten run: Hà Nội B PVF (9)
- Longest winless run: Sanatech Khách Hòa; Cà Mau; Tiền Giang (8)
- Longest losing run: Sanatech Khách Hòa (8)

The 2017 Vietnamese National Football Second League was the 19th season of the Vietnamese National Football Second League. The season began on 5 May 2017 and finished on 1 August 2017.

== Rule changes ==
In this season, there are 16 teams divided in two groups in qualifying stage according to geographic region. The top 4 team of each group will be qualified to final round. In final round, 8 teams will play 7 matches:

- Match 1: 1A vs 4B
- Match 2: 1B vs 4A
- Match 3: 2A vs 3B
- Match 4: 2B vs 3A
- Match 5: Match 1 winner vs Match 4 winner
- Match 6: Match 2 winner vs Match 3 winner
- Match 7: Match 5 loser vs Match 6 loser

The winners of Match 5, 6 and 7 will promote to 2018 V.League 2. The loser of Match 7 will play a play-off match with the club finished last in 2017 V.League 2. The play-off winner will earn the last spot to participate in 2018 V.League 2. The team with worst result in both groups will relegate to 2018 Vietnamese Third League.

== Team changes ==
The following teams have changed division since the 2016 season.

=== To Vietnamese Second League ===
Promoted from Vietnamese Third League

- Phù Đổng
- Kon Tum

Relegated from V.League 2

- Cà Mau

=== From Vietnamese Second League ===
Relegated to Vietnamese Third League

- Vĩnh Long

Promoted to V.League 2

- None

== Teams ==
Team location in Vietnam map

== Qualifying round ==
=== Group A ===
Pos	Team	Pld	W	D	L	GF	GA	GD	Pts	Qualification or relegation
1	Công An Nhân Dân (Q)	14	11	0	3	34	10	+24	33	Advance to final round
2	Hà Nội B (Q)	14	10	2	2	38	10	+28	32	Advance to final round
3	Lâm Đồng (Q)	14	8	2	4	27	21	+6	26	Advance to final round
4	Bình Định (Q)	14	7	2	5	18	14	+4	23	Advance to final round
5	Phù Đổng	14	4	4	6	19	21	−2	16 (Note: Phù Đổng ahead of Viettel B by head-to-head record: PD 0-1 VT; VT 1-2 PD)	
6	Viettel B	14	4	4	6	27	24	+3	16	
7	Kon Tum	14	2	3	9	15	39	−24	9	
8	Sanatech Khánh Hòa (R)	14	1	1	12	10	49	−39	4	Relegated to 2018 Vietnamese Third League

Source: VFF
(Q) Qualified for the phase indicated; (R) Relegated

=== Group B ===
Pos	Team	Pld	W	D	L	GF	GA	GD	Pts	Qualification or relegation
1	PVF (Q)	14	9	4	1	26	8	+18	31	Advance to final round
2	Bình Thuận (Q)	14	8	3	3	17	11	+6	27	Advance to final round
3	Long An B (Q)	14	7	3	4	16	10	+6	24	Advance to final round
4	Mancons Sài Gòn (Q)	14	7	2	5	17	15	+2	23	Advance to final round
5	An Giang	14	5	4	5	19	12	+7	19	
6	Tiền Giang	14	4	2	8	13	19	−6	14	
7	Cà Mau	14	2	4	8	15	27	−12	10	
8	Bến Tre	14	3	0	11	13	35	−22	9	

Source: VFF
(Q) Qualified for the phase indicated

== Results ==
=== Group A ===
Home \ Away	BDI	CAND	HNB	KTU	LDO	PDO	SKH	VTB
Bình Định		2–0	1–2	2–0	2–1	1–1	1–0	0–2
Công An Nhân Dân	2–0		0–3	7–0	2–0	2–0	5–0	1–0
Hà Nội B	1–0	1–2		7–1	6–0	1–0	5–0	3–0
Kon Tum	0–2	0–1	0–3		3–1	1–1	3–0	1–1
Lâm Đồng	2–0	3–1	2–0	2–0		2–1	4–0	4–2
Phù Đổng	2–3	0–4	0–2	2–2	1–1		6–1	1–0
Sanatech Khách Hòa	0–3	1–5	1–1	4–2	1–3	0–2		0–2
Viettel B	1–1	0–2	3–3	6–2	2–2	1–2	7–2	

Updated to match(es) played on 18 July 2017. Source: VFF
Legend: Blue = home team win; Yellow = draw; Red = away team win.

Team ╲ Round	1	2	3	4	5	6	7	8	9	10	11	12	13	14
Bình Định	1	4	3	2	4	4	4	3	3	3	3	3	4	4
Công An Nhân Dân	3	1	2	3	2	1	1	1	1	2	2	2	1	1
Hà Nội B	2	3	4	4	3	3	2	2	2	1	1	1	2	2
Kon Tum	7	5	5	6	7	7	7	7	7	7	7	7	7	7
Lâm Đồng	4	2	1	1	1	2	3	4	4	4	4	4	3	3
Phù Đổng	6	7	6	7	5	5	6	6	6	5	6	5	6	6
Sanatech Khách Hòa	8	8	8	8	8	8	8	8	8	8	8	8	8	8
Viettel B	5	6	7	5	6	6	5	5	5	6	5	6	5	5

Updated to match(es) played on 18 July 2017. Source: VFF
= Winner; = Advanced to final round

=== Group B ===
Home \ Away	AGI	BTR	BTH	CMA	LAB	MSG	PVF	TGI
An Giang		3–0	0–0	4–1	0–1	0–0	2–2	2–0
Bến Tre	2–1		0–1	3–1	1–2	1–3	0–3	3–2
Bình Thuận	1–1	2–0		2–0	1–0	3–0	1–1	2–0
Cà Mau	2–1	6–1	0–1		0–2	1–1	2–2	1–2
Long An B	1–0	2–1	4–0	1–1		2–0	0–2	1–3
Mancons Sài Gòn	0–3	1–0	2–1	3–0	1–0		1–0	3–0
PVF	1–0	5–1	2–0	4–0	0–0	2–1		1–0
Tiền Giang	1–2	3–0	0–2	0–0	0–0	2–1	0–1	

Legend: Blue = home team win; Yellow = draw; Red = away team win.

Team ╲ Round	1	2	3	4	5	6	7	8	9	10	11	12	13	14
An Giang	5	3	6	6	7	6	5	4	5	5	5	5	5	5
Bến Tre	2	4	7	7	6	7	7	7	8	7	7	8	8	8
Bình Thuận	6	7	5	5	4	2	4	3	4	3	4	3	3	2
Cà Mau	8	8	8	8	8	8	8	8	7	8	8	7	7	7
Long An B	1	1	3	4	3	4	2	2	2	1	2	2	2	3
Mancons Sài Gòn	3	5	4	2	1	1	1	5	3	4	3	4	4	4
PVF	4	2	1	3	5	5	3	1	1	2	1	1	1	1
Tiền Giang	7	6	2	1	2	3	6	6	6	6	6	6	6	6

Updated to match(es) played on 18 July 2017. Source: VFF
= Winner; = Advanced to final round

== Season progress ==
=== Group A ===
Team ╲ Round	1	2	3	4	5	6	7	8	9	10	11	12	13	14
Bình Định	W	L	W	W	L	D	W	W	W	W	L	L	L	D
Công An Nhân Dân	W	W	W	L	W	W	W	W	W	L	W	W	W	L
Hà Nội B	W	D	L	W	W	W	W	W	W	W	W	W	L	D
Kon Tum	L	W	L	L	L	D	L	W	L	L	L	L	D	D
Lâm Đồng	W	W	W	W	W	L	L	L	L	W	D	D	W	W
Phù Đổng	L	L	W	L	W	D	L	L	L	W	D	W	D	D
Sanatech Khách Hòa	L	L	L	L	L	L	L	L	W	L	L	L	L	D
Viettel B	L	D	L	W	L	D	W	L	L	L	W	D	W	D

Source: VFF
W = Win; D = Draw; L = Lose

=== Group B ===
Team ╲ Round	1	2	3	4	5	6	7	8	9	10	11	12	13	14
An Giang	L	W	L	D	L	W	W	W	L	D	D	L	D	W
Bến Tre	W	L	L	L	W	L	L	L	L	W	L	L	L	L
Bình Thuận	L	D	W	D	W	W	L	W	L	W	D	W	W	W
Cà Mau	L	L	L	D	L	D	D	D	W	L	L	W	L	L
Long An B	W	W	L	L	W	D	W	D	W	W	D	W	L	L
Mancons Sài Gòn	W	L	W	W	W	L	D	L	W	L	W	L	D	W
PVF	W	D	W	D	L	D	W	W	W	D	W	W	W	W
Tiền Giang	L	W	W	W	L	D	L	L	L	L	D	L	W	L

Source: VFF
W = Win; D = Draw; L = Lose

== Final round ==
=== Match 1 ===
25 July 2017
15:30

Công An Nhân Dân	4–0	Mancons Sài Gòn
Phạm Đức Thông 15'; Nguyễn Văn Long 80', 89'; Bùi Văn Hưng 84'	VFF

Tam Kỳ Stadium, Quảng Nam
Attendance: 200
Referee: Khổng Tam Cường

Công An Nhân Dân advance to Match 5.

=== Match 2 ===
25 July 2017
18:00

PVF	0–1	Bình Định
	VFF	Hồ Tấn Tài 86'

Tam Kỳ Stadium, Quảng Nam
Attendance: 200
Referee: Lê Đức Cảnh

Bình Định advance to Match 6.

=== Match 3 ===
26 July 2017
15:30

Hà Nội B	8–0	Long An B
Phạm Tuấn Hải 33', 40', 59'; Nguyễn Văn Đức 55', 67'; Phạm Văn Long 72', 86'; Lương Văn Hùng 86'	VFF

Tam Kỳ Stadium, Quảng Nam
Referee: Lê Thanh Tùng

Hà Nội B advance to Match 6.

=== Match 4 ===
26 July 2017
18:00

Bình Thuận	1–0	Lâm Đồng
Trịnh Đức Bốn 37'	VFF

Tam Kỳ Stadium, Quảng Nam
Referee: Mai Xuân Hùng

Bình Thuận advance to Match 5.

=== Match 5 ===
29 July 2017
15:30

Công An Nhân Dân	3–0	Bình Thuận
Nguyễn Hữu Tuấn 31', 36'; Đinh Văn Hưng 53'	VFF

Tam Kỳ Stadium, Quảng Nam
Referee: Khổng Tam Cường

Công An Nhân Dân promote to 2018 V.League 2. Bình Thuận enter Match 7.

=== Match 6 ===
29 July 2017
18:00

Bình Định	1–0	Hà Nội B
Lê Thanh Tài 73'	VFF

Tam Kỳ Stadium, Quảng Nam
Referee: Nguyễn Ngọc Thắng

Bình Định promote to 2018 V.League 2. Hà Nội B enter Match 7.

=== Match 7 ===
1 August 2017
15:30

Bình Thuận	0–3	Hà Nội B
	VFF	Phạm Tuấn Hải 37'; Đào Văn Nam 51', 71'

Tam Kỳ Stadium, Quảng Nam
Referee: Nguyễn Anh Vũ

Hà Nội B promote to 2018 V.League 2. Bình Thuận enter play-off match against club ranked 7th in 2017 V.League 2.
