= Hue FC =

Vietnamese football club

Hue
- Full name: Hue Football Club
- Nickname: Đội Bóng Cố đô (Ancient capital club)
- Founded: 1976; 50 years ago
- Ground: Tự Do Stadium
- Capacity: 25,000
- Chairman: Đoàn Phùng
- Manager: Lê Chí Nguyện
- League: V.League 2
- 2026: Vietnamese Second Division, 2nd of 7 (Group A, promoted)
- Website: bongda-hue-fc.com
Home colours	Away colours

Hue Football Club (Vietnamese: Câu lạc bộ bóng đá Huế), is a Vietnamese football club based in Huế. The club's home stadium is Tự Do Stadium. The club will compete in the 2026–27 V.League 2, after winning the promotion play-offs game in the Vietnamese Second Division.

== History ==
It is uncertain when football arrived at Huế. According to some remaining records, football matches were organized in Huế in the 1920s. The place where matches often took place between French soldiers' teams and Vietnamese teams in Huế was the "Sép" stadium, right on the north bank of the Hương River, next to Đông Ba Market.

In the Indochina and Central Vietnam football leagues, the team, with a core of Huế players, finished as runners-up three times in 1941, 1943, and 1944. Longtime football fans in Huế still often mention the famous names of Huế football players before the Revolution, such as: Bửu Phấn, Bửu Bàng, Tư Ếch, Minh, Hưởng, Tiền, Tốt... and the two famous players Nguyễn Hữu Tường and Nguyễn Hữu Hồ, who played for the Indochina national team.

After 1975, the Bình Trị Thiên team, the predecessor of the current Thừa Thiên Huế team, was established and participated in the Trường Sơn football league until 1979. After the establishment of National A1 League, the team played in the B division (equivalent to the current Second Division) due to economic difficulties and a lack of players. It was not until 1993, after many mergers and consolidations, that Thừa Thiên Huế players were promoted to the top tier.

The 1995 season was the most memorable in the history of the ancient capital's football. The Thừa Thiên Huế team, with players like Công Quốc, Đình Tuấn, Sỹ Hùng, and a series of other key players like Quý Tâm Anh, Quốc Dân, Quang Sang, Đức Dũng... led by coach Ninh Văn Bảo, unexpectedly made history with the runners-up title, after defeating famous teams such as Lâm Đồng, An Giang, Cảng Sài Gòn, before losing to Công An Hồ Chí Minh City in the final. However, the very next season, the Thừa Thiên Huế players were relegated.

In the 1998 season, the Thừa Thiên Huế team, under coach Nguyễn Đình Thọ, regained the right to play in the First Division after winning the promotion play-off matches against Hải Quan. In the 2002 season, Huda Huế under coach Đoàn Phùng was relegated from the V-League after losing a play-off match against Hà Nội ACB at Vinh Stadium. After 4 years playing in the First Division, in the 2007 season, Huda Huế returned to the V-League arena after a thrilling penalty shootout victory against Hải Phòng in the play-off match. It was noteworthy that the promoted Huda Huế team that year mainly consisted of U20 players who had matured after the National Phù Đổng Health Festival in Huế in 2004. Just one year later, due to insufficient investment, Huda Huế returned to play in the First Division until the 2011 season, when the team was relegated again to the Second Division.

After being relegated to the Second Division, the club also faced many financial difficulties when the sponsor Huda Beer officially withdrew. In that situation, the team's leadership decided to completely renew the team with the determination to get promoted to the First Division. First, they adopted the name Huế Football Club, without a sponsor's name. Then, they renewed the squad by promoting players who had won the gold medal at the 2004 Phù Đổng Health Festival and the 2006 National U-13 Football Championship for Huế, such as: Minh Hoàng, Công Nhật, Ngọc Mười, Đức Phát, Võ Lỹ,... plus key players including Tuấn Tú, Trọng Trung, Khoa Nhật, Hữu Quang, Hữu Vân... And that change brought good results: in the 2013 season, Huế won the Second Division and returned to the First Division.

At the end of the 2014 V.League 2 season, the young squad of coach Nguyễn Đức Dũng finished 5th out of 8 participating teams. In 2014, the team also represented Vietnamese football at the 2014 Mekong Region Games in Thailand and excellently won the championship. In December, the whole team won the silver medal in Men's Football at the 2014 Vietnamese National Games after a 0-4 loss to Sông Lam Nghệ An in the final.

In the 2019 season, with the participation of young players Trần Danh Trung, Nguyễn Hữu Thắng,... Huế finished 5th with 9 wins, 2 draws, and 11 losses.

== Stadium ==
The home ground of Huế is Tự Do Stadium. It is a stadium located in Thuận Hóa ward, Huế, Vietnam, with a capacity of about 25,000 seats. Tự Do Stadium was built by the French around the early 1930s and named Stade Olympique de Hué. Later, the Nguyễn Dynasty renamed the stadium Bảo Long Stadium (Bảo Long was the crown prince of King Bảo Đại and Queen Nam Phương).

== Kits and sponsors ==
Period	Kit supplier	Shirt sponsor (chest)	Shirt sponsor (back)
2000/01	(Germany) Adidas (T-1)	Highlands Coffee (league-wide V-League); Pepsi (league-wide National Cup); Tiger Beer (domestic-wide)	SyncMaster (domestic-wide)
2001/02	(Germany) Adidas (T-1)	Strata (league-wide V-League); Samsung (league-wide National Cup); Tiger Beer (domestic-wide)	SyncMaster (domestic-wide)
2019–2022	(Germany) Adidas (K)	Bamboo Airways (National Cup 2020)	
2023-2024	(Vietnam) VNASPORTS (T)		
2024-	(Vietnam) CR SPORT (T)		

Note: (K): Information about sponsorship unknown/Team purchased kits themselves; (T): Sponsored; (T-1): In the 2000–2002 period, the entire domestic league system (including the Professional V-League and National Cup) was sponsored by Adidas.

== Players ==
=== Current squad ===
As of 4 September 2026

Note: Flags indicate national team as defined under FIFA eligibility rules; some limited exceptions apply. Players may hold more than one non-FIFA nationality.

No.	Pos.	Nation	Player
1	GK	VIE	Lê Viết Minh Trí
2	DF	VIE	Lê Xuân Đăng
3	DF	VIE	Vi Đình Thượng
5	DF	VIE	Nguyễn Lương Tuấn Khải
7	FW	VIE	Dương Anh Vũ
9	FW	VIE	Nguyễn Hữu Tuấn (on loan from Thể Công-Viettel)
10	FW	VIE	Nguyễn Đăng Khoa
11	FW	VIE	Hoàng Công Hậu (on loan from Thể Công-Viettel)
14	MF	VIE	Nguyễn Bá Đức
16	DF	VIE	Nguyễn Quốc Hoàng
17	MF	VIE	Ngô Hoàng Quân
18	FW	VIE	Võ Văn Tuấn Kiệt
19	DF	VIE	Bùi Công Chính
20	MF	VIE	Lê Quang Vũ

No.	Pos.	Nation	Player
21	FW	VIE	Nguyễn Hữu Nhật Long
22	DF	VIE	Nguyễn Đình Bình
23	GK	VIE	Nguyễn Tiến Quyền
26	MF	VIE	Vũ Tùng Dương (on loan from Thể Công-Viettel)
28	GK	VIE	Võ Đức Bảo
32	DF	VIE	Lê Viết Hiếu
36	MF	VIE	Trần Văn Quang
37	DF	VIE	Đặng Thanh Bình (on loan from Thể Công-Viettel)
42	DF	VIE	Trần Đình Sửu
64	DF	VIE	Trần Đình Thanh Phong
68	DF	VIE	Nguyễn Đình Đới
74	FW	VIE	Trương Ngọc Bảo Long
77	FW	VIE	Nguyễn Mạnh Lâm Sơn
88	MF	VIE	Hoàng Quang Dũng

=== Notable former players ===
- Nguyễn Viết Rớt
- Nguyễn Đình Thọ
- Lê Đức Anh Tuấn
- Trần Quang Sang
- Lê Văn Trương
- Hứa Hiền Vinh
- Dương Công Quốc
- Võ Lý
- Nguyễn Công Nhật
- Trần Đình Minh Hoàng
- Trần Thành
- Trần Danh Trung
- Nguyễn Thanh Bình
- Nguyễn Hữu Thắng
- Hồ Thanh Minh
- Lê Quốc Nhật Nam

== Coaching staff ==
Position	Name
Head coach	(Vietnam) Lê Chí Nguyện
Assistant coach	(Vietnam) Nguyễn Hoàng Linh
Assistant coach	(Vietnam) Nguyễn Văn Chiến
Goalkeeping coach	(Vietnam) Nguyễn Văn Dũng
Technical director	(Vietnam) Nguyễn Đức Dũng
Manager	(Vietnam) Trần Quang Sang

== Managerial history ==
- Managers with this background and italics are caretaker appointments.

List of managers
Name	Period
(Vietnam) Nguyễn Hồng Vinh	1993–1995
(Vietnam) Ninh Văn Bảo	1995–1996
(Vietnam) Nguyễn Đình Thọ	1998–2001
(Vietnam) Đoàn Phùng	2001–2003
(Vietnam) Nguyễn Đình Thọ	2003–2004
(Vietnam) Nguyễn Kim Hằng	2004–2005
(Vietnam) Đoàn Phùng	2006–2007
(Vietnam) Trần Quang Sang	2008
(Vietnam) Đoàn Phùng	2008–2010
(Vietnam) Nguyễn Đức Dũng	2011–2018
(Vietnam) Phan Văn Trí	2019
(Vietnam) Nguyễn Đức Dũng	2019–2025
(Vietnam) Lê Chí Nguyện	2026–present

== Honours ==
League

- V.League 1:

(silver) Runners-up : 1995

- V.League 2:

(silver) Runners-up : 2015, 2017
(bronze) Third place : 2004, 2006

- Second League:

(gold) Winners : 2013
Cup

- Vietnamese Cup:

(silver) Runners-up : 2002

== Season-by-season record ==
Key
Champions
Runners-up
Third place
Fourth place
Promoted
Relegation play-off	Won play-off
Relegation play-off	Lost play-off
Relegated

Performance of Hue FC from 1995 to present
Year	Division				Position	Pld	W	D (Note: Except for the 1995 season, a match decided by a penalty shoot-out was counted as a draw.)	L	GF	GA	Pts
Year	I	II	III	IV	Position	Pld	W	D	L	GF	GA	Pts
1995					Runners-up	18	10	– (Note: According to the format of this season, all drawn matches had to be decided by a penalty shoot-out.)	8	19	20	20
1996					11th	22	3	9	10	20	33	18
1997					Unknown	Specific records unknown						
1998					Joint 3rd	5	3	1	1	6	4	10
1999					4th in Group B (Note: In 1999, the national championship was not held, only the Spring Training Tournament was organized.)	6	2	2	2	7	7	8
1999–00					7th	24	9	5	10	30	29	32
2000–01					8th	18	6	5	7	16	21	23
2001–02					9th	18	6	3	9	17	24	21
2003					4th	22	9	7	6	24	16	34
2004					3rd	22	13	6	3	33	14	45
2005					5th	22	8	8	6	28	27	32
2006					3rd	26	9	12	5	34	28	39
2007					13th	26	4	8	14	25	44	20
2008					6th	26	10	7	9	40	35	37
2009					5th	24	9	7	8	21	16	34
2010					11th	24	7	6	11	27	38	27
2011					14th	26	4	8	14	31	51	20
2012					Joint 3rd	9	5	2	2	12	7	17
2013					Champions	9	7	1	1	17	4	22
2014					5th	14	5	4	5	16	16	19
2015					2nd	14	7	3	4	16	10	24
2016					7th	18	6	4	8	29	26	22
2017					2nd	12	5	5	2	21	10	20
2018					7th	18	5	5	8	26	31	20
2019					6th	22	9	2	11	33	36	29
2020					9th	16	4	6	6	14	19	18
2021					Season cancelled due to the COVID-19 pandemic							
2022					7th	22	6	7	9	20	31	25
2023					6th	18	5	6	7	19	19	21
2023–24					4th	20	8	6	6	26	22	30
2024–25					11th	20	4	4	12	16	30	16
