= Trần Minh Lợi =

Vietnamese footballer

Personal information
- Full name: Trần Minh Lợi
- Date of birth: September 19, 1986 (age 40)
- Place of birth: Sa Đéc, Đồng Tháp, Vietnam
- Height: 1.65 m (5 ft 5 in)
- Position: Midfielder

Youth career
- 2002–2011: An Giang

Senior career*
Years	Team	Apps	(Gls)
2012–2018	Đồng Tháp	142	(23)
2015	→ Sanna Khánh Hòa BVN (loan)	7	(1)
2018	Bình Phước		
2019	An Giang	9	(0)
2019–2020	Vĩnh Long		
2020–2021	Đồng Tháp		
2022	Bình Thuận		
2023–2024	Định Hướng Phú Nhuận		
2024–	Gia Định		
- * Club domestic league appearances and goals

Trần Minh Lợi (born 19 September 1986) is a Vietnamese footballer who plays for the TĐCS Đồng Tháp as a midfielder.

Growing up Minh Lợi was often made fun of and pushed around for his small stature, but after graduating from the An Giang academy he has quickly cemented his position at Đồng Tháp as the team captain.
