= Nguyễn Đồng Tháp =

Vietnamese footballer (born 1995)

Personal information
- Date of birth: 3 November 1995 (age 30)
- Place of birth: Vietnam
- Height: 1.76 m (5 ft 9 in)
- Position: Defender

Senior career*
Years	Team	Apps	(Gls)
2015–2020	Đồng Tháp	36+	(1+)
- * Club domestic league appearances and goals

Nguyễn Đồng Tháp (born 3 November 1995) is a Vietnamese footballer who last played as a defender for Đồng Tháp.

== Early life ==
He was born in 1995 in Vietnam. He joined the youth academy of Vietnamese side Đồng Tháp at the age of fourteen.

== Career ==
He started his career with Vietnamese side Đồng Tháp. He was described as "showed confidence and outstanding professional progress" while playing for the club.

== Style of play ==
He mainly operates as a defender. He is known for his speed.

== Personal life ==
He is a native of Cao Lãnh, Vietnam. He has three sisters.
