= Phan Thanh Giang =

Vietnamese footballer

Personal information
- Full name: Phan Thanh Giang
- Date of birth: October 3, 1981 (age 45)
- Place of birth: Thoại Sơn, An Giang, Vietnam
- Height: 1.78 m (5 ft 10 in)
- Positions: Defender; midfielder

Youth career
- 1993–2002: An Giang

Senior career*
| Years | Team | Apps | (Gls) |
| 2003–2014 | Đồng Tâm Long An | 352 | (7) |
| 2015–2020 | Cà Mau | 126 | (5) |

International career
| 2005–2007 | Vietnam U23 | 8 | (0) |
| 2008–2011 | Vietnam | 22 | (0) |
- * Club domestic league appearances and goals

Phan Thanh Giang (born 3 October 1981) is a Vietnamese footballer who plays for Cà Mau. He played for Vietnamese international at the 2008 AFF Suzuki Cup.

== Honors ==
Đồng Tâm Long An:

V-League: 2005, 2006
Vietnamese Cup: 2005

Vietnam:

ASEAN Football Championship: 2008
