= Nguyễn Văn Việt =

Nguyễn Văn Việt also refer to:

- Nguyễn Văn Việt (footballer, born 1989), Vietnamese footballer
- Nguyễn Văn Việt (footballer, born 1999), Vietnamese footballer
- Nguyễn Văn Việt (footballer, born 2002), Vietnamese footballer
