= Quang Ngai FC (1990) =

Vietnamese football club

Quảng Ngãi
- Full name: Quảng Ngãi Football Club
- Founded: 1990; 36 years ago
- Dissolved: 2017
- Ground: Quảng Ngãi Province, Vietnam
- League: N/A (club dissolved)
| Home colours | Away colours |

Quảng Ngãi Football Club (Vietnamese: Câu lạc bộ bóng đá Quảng Ngãi) was a football club, based in Quảng Ngãi Province, Vietnam. The team was formed in 1990 and dissolution in 2012, but refounded in 2017 and dissolution six years later.

== Demotion to Second Division in 2009 ==
During a match against Sài Gòn United FC in 2009 Vietnamese National Football First League, Quảng Ngãi FC's player voluntarily abandoned the match from the 70th minute at Thống Nhất Stadium to protest the referee's decision. As a result, Quảng Ngãi FC was relegated to the 2010 Second Division by the Vietnam Football Federation. All match results of Quảng Ngãi FC in 2009 First Division football season were declared null and void.

== Achievements ==
=== National competitions ===
League

- Second League:

(gold) Winners : 2006
