= Trần Công Minh =

Vietnamese footballer

Personal information
- Full name: Trần Công Minh
- Date of birth: 16 February 1999 (age 27)
- Place of birth: Cao Lãnh, Đồng Tháp, Vietnam
- Height: 1.71 m (5 ft 7 in)
- Position: Forward

Team information
- Current team: Đồng Tháp
- Number: 31

Youth career
- 2012–2016: Đồng Tháp

Senior career*
Years	Team	Apps	(Gls)
2017–	Đồng Tháp	2	(0)

International career
2018–2019	Vietnam U19	1	(0)
- * Club domestic league appearances and goals as of 2 April 2018

Trần Công Minh is a Vietnamese footballer who plays as a forward for V.League 2 club Đồng Tháp.

== Club career ==
In 2016, Công Minh was the best player at the Vietnamese National U-17 Football Championship, scoring the goals and making big contributions to U-17 Đồng Tháp winning the championship after defeating U-17 PVF in the match final. Two years prior, at the Vietnamese National U-15 Football Championship, Công Minh scored the opening goal for U-15 Đồng Tháp to overcome U-15 PVF in the final to win the championship.

== Honours ==
=== Club ===
Đồng Tháp

- U-19 Championship: 2018
- U-17 Championship: 2016

=== Individual ===
- Best player of Vietnamese National U-17 Football Championship: 2016
- Best player of Vietnamese National U-19 Football Championship: 2018
- Top scorer of Vietnamese National U-19 Football Championship: 2018
