= Tay Ninh FC =

Vietnamese football club

Tây Ninh FC
- Full name: Tây Ninh Football Club
- Nickname: Núi Bà Đen
- Founded: 1976; 50 years ago
- Ground: Tây Ninh Province Sports Training and Competition Center
- Capacity: 500
- Manager: Trương Đình Luật
- League: Vietnamese Second Division
- 2026: Vietnamese Second Division, 4th of 7 (Group B)
Home colours	Away colours

Tay Ninh Football Club (Vietnamese: Câu lạc bộ Bóng đá Tây Ninh) is a professional football club, based in Tây Ninh, Vietnam. The team is currently competing in the Vietnamese Second Division.

== Honours ==
=== National competitions ===
League

- Second League:

(gold) Winners : 2013, 2015
(silver) Runners-up : 2005

== Current squad ==
As of 24 March 2026

Note: Flags indicate national team as defined under FIFA eligibility rules; some limited exceptions apply. Players may hold more than one non-FIFA nationality.

No.	Pos.	Nation	Player
1	GK	VIE	Nguyễn Phúc Hậu
2	DF	VIE	Phan Thanh Sang
3	DF	VIE	Nguyễn Thanh Tùng
4	DF	VIE	Hồ Quốc Thịnh
5	DF	VIE	Trần Văn Hào
6	MF	VIE	A Thạch
7	MF	VIE	Phạm Ngọc Quốc
8	MF	VIE	A Na Lực
9	FW	VIE	Ngô Tấn Tài
10	FW	VIE	A Vũ
11	FW	VIE	Trương Đan Huy
12	MF	VIE	Nguyễn Thanh Lâm
13	MF	VIE	Hồ Quốc Tân
14	MF	VIE	Nguyễn Chính Tính
15	MF	VIE	Lâm Văn Ngoan

No.	Pos.	Nation	Player
16	MF	VIE	Ngô Dương Thái
17	DF	VIE	Đặng Gia Thiên
18	FW	VIE	Hồ Thành Đạt
19	MF	VIE	Phạm Duy Khan
20	MF	VIE	A Giô Suê
21	DF	VIE	Đoàn Xuân Tuấn Kiệt
22	DF	VIE	Phạm Nguyễn
23	GK	VIE	Cao Nguyễn Trung Tín
24	DF	VIE	Lê Thanh Dinh
25	FW	VIE	Lê Nhật Nghi
26	GK	VIE	Nguyễn Hoài Phong
27	DF	VIE	Trần Quốc Thái
28	MF	VIE	Nguyễn Thanh Trí
29	FW	VIE	Trần Tuấn Khanh
30	MF	VIE	Nguyễn Duy Tuấn

== Managerial history ==
- Nguyễn Thanh Giang (2003–2004)
- Hồ Văn Thụ (2005–2008)
- Võ Hoàng Bửu (2008–2008)
- Vũ Trường Giang (2008–2009)
- Phạm Anh Tuấn (2009–2012)
- Vũ Trường Giang (2012–2014)
- Mang Văn Xích (2014–2018)
- Nguyễn Hoàng Huân Chương (2018–2019)
- Nguyễn Đình Hùng (2019–2020)
- Hoàng Hải Dương (2020–2021)
- Trương Đình Luật (2022)
- Hồ Thanh Hào (2023–present)
