= Binh Thuan FC =

- Full name: Binh Thuan Football Club
- Nickname: Dragon Fruits
- Short name: BTFC
- Founded: 1994
- Dissolved: 2023
- Stadium: Phan Thiết Stadium
- Capacity: 6,000
- Coach: Nguyễn Minh Dũng
- League: V.League 2
- 2023: V.League 2, 5th of 10
Home colours	Away colours

Binh Thuan Football Club (Vietnamese: Câu lạc bộ bóng đá Bình Thuận), simply known as Binh Thuan, was a Vietnamese football club based in Phan Thiet, Binh Thuan. The team last played in the V.League 2 and had its home ground at Phan Thiet Stadium.

== History ==
In the 1994 season, Binh Thuan Club participated in the National A1 football tournament. The team faced Hanoi Police in the final match at Pleiku Stadium. After 120 minutes of play, the two teams drew 2-2. Binh Thuan lost in the 6th penalty shootout, missed the opportunity to participate in the National Football Tournament of Strong Teams.

2016 continues to be an unsuccessful season for Binh Thuan. Although the goal of relegation is completed, the playing style of the players has many problems. During the entire season, the club was always in the top "holding the red light" with a very high risk of relegation when only a few points above the bottom team. In 12 matches, the team won only 2 matches, drew 6 and lost 4, ranked 5th overall in the qualifying round of Group A. Binh Thuan team had the least number of goals among 14 participating teams when they only scored 8 table. This is the lowest record ever in the team's history.

2017 season After 14 rounds, Binh Thuan ranked 2nd in Group B with 27 points, winning the right to participate in the final round. In the first match of the final round, the club won a minimal victory over Lam Dong thanks to Trinh Duc Bon's only goal. The next two matches, the team continuously lost 0–3 to Cong An Nhan Dan and 0-3 first Hà Nội B. The club must play a play-off match to win promotion. Here, the team lost 1–2 to Dong Thap, continuing to miss the opportunity to promote.

In the 2022 season, Binh Thuan won 23 points after 12 rounds, winning the right to participate in the final round of the tournament, facing Hai Nam Vinh Yen Vinh Phuc club. At the final match held on June 8, 2022, at 19 August Stadium, Nha Trang, Khanh Hoa. In the 33rd minute of the match, defender Ngo Anh Vu from Binh Thuan side had an error with an opponent player. Referee Tran Ngoc Nho showed the midfielder a second yellow card, meaning he was disqualified. Disagreed with that decision, Ngo Anh Vu attacked referee Tran Ngoc Nho. Everything ended only after the security forces and the coaching staff of the two teams intervened. Binh Thuan was leading 2-0 and played at a loss after 45 minutes of play. However, in the second half, two goals from Nguyen Dinh Loi in the 56th minute and Thanh Hung in the 77th minute helped the team equalize the score. After 120 minutes of play, the two teams were still tied with a score of 2-2. In the end, Binh Thuan won on penalties with a score of 8–7, thereby gaining the right to play in the 2023 V.League 2 after nearly 30 years.

== Current squad ==
As of 3 January 2023.

Note: Flags indicate national team as defined under FIFA eligibility rules; some limited exceptions apply. Players may hold more than one non-FIFA nationality.

No.	Pos.	Nation	Player
1	GK	VIE	Ngô Quốc Cường
3	DF	VIE	Hoàng Văn Quyết
4	DF	VIE	Nguyễn Thanh Quang
5	DF	VIE	Nguyễn Xuân Luân
6	DF	VIE	Võ Văn Huy
7	MF	VIE	Đoàn Tuấn Phong
8	MF	VIE	Nguyễn Lê Minh Khôi
9	FW	VIE	Lưu Công Sơn
10	FW	VIE	Nguyễn Quốc Hoàng
11	MF	VIE	Võ Thanh Hậu
13	GK	VIE	Nguyễn Hoàng Minh Duy
14	MF	VIE	Lê Duy Đạt
15	DF	VIE	Nguyễn Thành Kiên
16	DF	VIE	Mai Thanh Nam

No.	Pos.	Nation	Player
17	MF	VIE	Nguyễn Xuân Phong
18	FW	VIE	Nguyễn Vũ Trường Giang
19	FW	VIE	Trương Anh Dương
21	DF	VIE	Nguyễn Công Chính
22	DF	VIE	Trần Hữu Thắng
23	DF	VIE	Phạm Đăng Tuấn
25	DF	VIE	Lê Thành Lâm
26	MF	VIE	Nguyễn Văn Đô
30	DF	VIE	Nguyễn Văn Thái
31	MF	VIE	Nguyễn Lê Quốc Trường
59	MF	VIE	Đinh Hoàng Max
77	FW	VIE	Nguyễn Đình Lợi
