= V.League 2 =

Vietnamese football league

- Organising body: Vietnam Professional Football
- Founded: 2000; 26 years ago: 1996–2000 (as Second Division); 1990–1996 (as A1 League); 1980–1989 (as A2 League)
- Country: Vietnam
- Confederation: AFC
- Number of clubs: Variable (14 teams as of 2026-27)
- Level on pyramid: 2
- Promotion to: V.League 1
- Relegation to: Second Division
- Domestic cup(s): Vietnamese Cup; Vietnamese Super Cup
- International cup: AFC Champions League Two (via Vietnamese Cup)
- Current champions: Truong Tuoi Dong Nai (1st title)
- Most championships: Binh Dinh; Dong Thap; Long An; Ho Chi Minh City; Quang Nam (2 titles cach)
- Broadcaster(s): FPT Play
- Website: vpf.vn
- Current: 2026–27 V.League 2

The Vietnamese Football League First Division (Vietnamese: Giải bóng đá hạng Nhất Quốc gia, lit. 'National First Division Football League'), officially stylized as V.League 2, is the second-highest league of the Vietnamese football league system after the V.League 1, and is currently contested by 14 clubs. The current holders are Truong Tuoi Dong Nai, who won the 2025–26 season.

== League structure ==
Starting in the 2025–26 season, the league comprises 14 teams. Over the course of a season, which runs annually from September/October to the following June/July, each team plays twice against the others in the league, once at 'home' and once 'away', resulting in each team competing in 26 games in total. Three points are awarded for a win, one for a draw, and zero for a loss. The teams are ranked in the league table by points gained, then goal difference, then goals scored, and then their head-to-head record for that season (including away goals record).

At the end of the season, the top two team is promoted to the V.League 1 and the bottom two teams are relegated to Second Division.

== Competition format ==
Seasons 2000 to 2019: teams played a double round-robin format to earn points. The champion team was promoted to V.League 1. The bottom 1 or 2 teams were relegated to the National Second Division. This format was used again in the 2022 and 2023 seasons, the last seasons to be held in a calendar year.

In the 2020 season, after the first round of the round-robin, the top 6 teams played a single round-robin to find the champion, and the remaining 6 teams played a single round-robin to find the team to be relegated. The 2021 season was cancelled due to the COVID-19 pandemic. From the 2023–24 season onwards, the teams will play a double round-robin format over two years, from the autumn of the previous year to the summer of the following year.

== Television ==
On 1 November 2022, FPT Group-owned FPT Play will be the new domestic broadcaster for Vietnamese Professional Football Leagues competitions (V.League 1, V.League 2 and Vietnamese Cup) effectively from 2023 until 2027.

== Prize money ==
The prize money of the league as of 2025–26 V.League 2:

Position	Purse (VND)
Champion	2,000,000,000
Runner-up	1,000,000,000
Third-place	500,000,000

== Current members ==
The following 14 clubs compete in the V.League 2 during the 2026–27 season.

Locations of the 2026–27 V.League 2 teams
Locations of Ho Chi Minh City teams

Club	Finishing position 2025-26 season	Location	Stadium	Capacity
PVF-CAND	13th in V.League 1 (relegated)	Hung Yen province	PVF Stadium	4,500
Becamex Ho Chi Minh	14th in V.League 1 (relegated)	Ho Chi Minh	Binh Duong Stadium	13,035
HCMC F.C.	3rd	Ba Ria–Vung Tau	Ba Ria Stadium	10,000
Quy Nhon United	4th	Gia Lai	Quy Nhơn Stadium	15,000
Xuan Thien Phu Tho	5th	Phu Tho	Viet Tri Stadium	20,000
Van Hien University	7th	Ho Chi Minh	Thong Nhat Stadium	14,400
Khatoco Khanh Hoa	8th	Khanh Hoa	19 August Stadium	18,000
Quang Ninh	9th	Quang Ninh	Cam Pha Stadium	20,000
Dong Thap F.C.	10th	Dong Thap	Cao Lanh Stadium	18,000
Long An FC	11th	Tây Ninh	Long An Stadium	20,000
Hanoi F.C. B	Winner of 2026 Vietnamese Second Division - Final Stage - Round 1	Hanoi	TBD	-
Hue F.C.	Winner of 2026 Vietnamese Second Division - Final Stage - Round 1	Hue (city)	Tu Do Stadium	25,000
Lam Dong	Winner of 2026 Vietnamese Second Division - Final Stage - Round 2	Lam Dong	Da Lat Stadium	20,000

== Results ==
Season	Champions	Runner-up	Third place
2000–01	Binh Dinh	Da Nang	Ho Chi Minh City Customs Football Club
2001–02	Gach Dong Tam Long An	Dong Thap	Hoang Anh Gia Lai
2003	Haiphong	Binh Duong	Thanh Hoa
2004	Saigon Port	Hoa Phat Hà Noi	Thua Thien Hue
2005	Khatoco Khanh Hoa	Tien Giang	Dong A Bank
2006	Dong Thap	Thanh Hoa	Huda Hue
2007	Thể Công	Van Hoa Haiphong	An Giang
2008	Quân Khu 4	Hanoi T&T	Cao Su Dong Thap
2009	Vissai Ninh Binh	Hoa Phat Hanoi	XSKT Can Tho
2010	Hanoi ACB	Than Quang Ninh	SQC Binh Dinh
2011	Xuan Thanh Saigon Cement	Kienlongbank Kien Giang	SQC Bình Dinh
2012	Dong Tam Long An	Hanoi T&T B	Dong Nai
2013	QNK Quang Nam	Than Quang Ninh	Hung Vuong An Giang
2014	TĐCS Dong Thap	Sanna Khanh Hoa BVN	XSKT Can Tho
2015	Hanoi T&T B	Hue	Ho Chi Minh City
2016	Ho Chi Minh City	Viettel	Nam Dinh
2017	Nam Dinh	Hue	Binh Phuoc
2018	Viettel	Hanoi B	Dong Thap
2019	Hong Linh Ha Tinh	Pho Hien	Binh Phuoc
2020	Binh Dinh	Ba Ria Vung Tau	Sanna Khanh Hoa BVN
2021	Competition abandoned due to COVID-19 pandemic in Vietnam		
2022	Cong An Nhan Dan	Khanh Hoa	Quang Nam
2023	Quang Nam	PVF-CAND	Long An
2023–24	SHB Da Nang	PVF-CAND	Truong Tuoi Binh Phuoc
2024–25	Phu Dong Ninh Binh	Truong Tuoi Binh Phuoc	PVF-CAND
2025–26	Truong Tuoi Dong Nai	Bac Ninh	Ho Chi Minh City

== Top scorers ==
Season	Top scorer(s)	Club(s)	Goals
2005	(Ghana) Felix Aboagye	Khatoco Khanh Hoa	14
2006	(Vietnam) Đặng Phương Nam	Thể Công	14
2007	(Vietnam) Trịnh Quang Vinh	Thể Công	13
2008	(Brazil) Flávio Cruz	Huda Hue	18
2009	(Brazil) Eduardo Henrique Furrier	Than Quang Ninh	16
2010	(Vietnam) Nguyễn Xuân Thành	Hanoi ACB	13
2010	(Brazil) Jorge Luiz Cruz	Boss Binh Dinh	13
2010	(Cameroon) Christian Nsi Amougou	Than Quang Ninh	13
2010	(Vietnam) Nguyễn Thành Trung	An Giang	13
2011	(Cameroon) Christian Nsi Amougou	Xuan Thanh Saigon Cement	17
2012	(Mali) Souleymane Diabate	XSKT Can Tho	21
2013	(Nigeria) Uche Iheruome	Hung Vuong An Giang	10
2013	(Vietnam) Đinh Thanh Trung	QNK Quang Nam	10
2014	(Vietnam) Huỳnh Văn Thanh	Sanna Khanh Hoa BVN	10
2015	(Vietnam) Trịnh Duy Long	Hanoi T&T B	9
2016	(Vietnam) Hồ Sỹ Giáp	Binh Phuoc	12
2016	(Vietnam) Nguyễn Tuấn Anh	Ho Chi Minh City	12
2017	(Vietnam) Võ Văn Minh	Hue	5
2017	(Vietnam) Phạm Văn Thuận	Nam Dinh	5
2017	(Vietnam) Nguyễn Hồng Quân	Dak Lak	5
2017	(Vietnam) Bùi Duy Thường	Viettel	5
2018	(Vietnam) Y Thăng Êban	Dak Lak	15
2019	(Vietnam) Nguyễn Xuân Nam	Pho Hien	14
2020	(Vietnam) Nguyễn Công Thành	Dong Thap	12
2022	(Vietnam) Nguyễn Thanh Nhàn	Pho Hien	10
2023	(Vietnam) Nguyễn Thanh Nhàn	PVF-CAND	10
2023	(Vietnam) Lê Văn Nam	Quang Nam	10
2023–24	(Vietnam) Bùi Văn Bình	Ba Ria-Vung Tau	11
2024–25	(Vietnam) Lưu Tự Nhân	Trường Tươi Bình Phước	9
2025–26	(Brazil) Tháileon	Quy Nhơn United	14
