= Daklak FC =

Vietnamese football club

Daklak
- Full name: Daklak Football Club; Câu lạc bộ Bóng đá Đắk Lắk
- Nickname: Những Chú Voi Con (The Baby Elephants)
- Short name: DLK
- Founded: 1975; 51 years ago
- Ground: Buôn Ma Thuột Stadium, Buôn Ma Thuột, Đắk Lắk, Vietnam
- Capacity: 25,000
- Owner: Daklak Government
- Chairman: Võ Thành Danh
- Manager: Đinh Văn Dũng
- League: Vietnamese Second Division
- 2026: Vietnamese Second Division, 5th of 7 (Group B)
Home colours	Away colours	Third colours

Daklak Football Club (Vietnamese: Câu lạc bộ Bóng đá Đắk Lắk), simply known as Daklak, is a professional football club, based in Buôn Mê Thuột, Đắk Lắk, Vietnam that plays in the Vietnamese Second Division, the third tier of Vietnamese football.

== History ==
Dak Lak was promoted to the 2014 V.League 2 after winning their playoff match between Nam Dinh in November 2013. 2013 season after 10 years of competition in second place teams played excellent and won 2nd Group B with 6 wins, 4 draws after 10 rounds. Date 27/07/2013 official team won promotion to Championship 2014 after a 1–0 win in Nam Dinh. 2015 V.League 2, the team ranked 5th with victory over the People's Public Security official and relegation.2016 V.League 2, the team ranked 6th with victory over the Dong Nai official and relegation.

Daklak is located in the center of the Central Highlands.Dak Lak is a province with a long history of football. In 1976, Dak Lak participated in the football competition Truong Son in the central region and in the next year all participated in the A2, A1 national football league, as well as having participated in the national first class since the early 1990s.

Presently, Dak Lak province has about 20 football coaches graduated from the university, including 6 coaches in C, 2 coaches in B under the AFC certification and 1 in FIFA management certificates, 2 masters. Trainers are allocated to training and provincial teams.

Buon Ma Thuot Stadium, with a capacity of 25,000 seats, is one of the largest yards in the Central Region.

== Stadium ==
Their Buôn Ma Thuột Stadium has a capacity of 25.000 seats.

== Honours ==
=== National competitions ===
- Second League:

(gold) Winners : (1) 2002
(silver) Runners-up : (1) 2013

== Current squad ==
As of 1 April 2026

Note: Flags indicate national team as defined under FIFA eligibility rules; some limited exceptions apply. Players may hold more than one non-FIFA nationality.

No.	Pos.	Nation	Player
1	GK	VIE	Huỳnh Võ Trương Hào
2		VIE	Nguyễn Thanh Huy Bảo
3		VIE	Nguyễn Đức Trường
4		VIE	Võ Trọng Nguyên
5		VIE	Cao Lương Quang Huy
6		VIE	Nguyễn Phú Nhã
8		VIE	Nguyễn Phú Anh Tuấn
9		VIE	Nguyễn Nhất Minh
10		VIE	Nguyễn Hữu Hưng
11		VIE	Nguyễn Nhật Hoàng
14		VIE	Trương Lê Minh Nhật
15		VIE	Đặng Huỳnh Văn An
17		VIE	Nguyễn Hoàng Bá Vĩ

No.	Pos.	Nation	Player
18		VIE	Nguyễn Duy Mạnh
21		VIE	Trần Trung Dũng
23	GK	VIE	Phạm Vũ Huy Cường
26		VIE	Phan Lê Chinh
27		VIE	Trần Thanh Bình
28		VIE	Kpuih Anh
33		VIE	Huỳnh Ngọc Tấn Nam
37		VIE	Nguyễn Trung Đạt
38		VIE	Nguyễn Trung Thành
77		VIE	Huỳnh Vương Quốc Thịnh
79		VIE	Phạm Huỳnh Minh Đạt
99	GK	VIE	Trương Lê Anh Vũ

== Kit manufacturers and shirt sponsors ==
=== Kit manufacturers ===
- 2021–Present: Demenino Sport

=== Shirt sponsors ===
- 1976–1995: No sponsors
- 1996–1999: Sharp
- 2000–2013: Mitsubishi
- 2014–2015: Toyota
- 2016–Present: Trung Nguyên

== Coaching staff ==
Statistic from August 2022

Position	Name
Head coach	(Vietnam) Võ Thành Luân
Technical director	(Vietnam) Trần Phi Ái

=== Managers since 2000 ===
- (Vietnam) Võ Thành Danh (2000–2013)
- (Vietnam) Trần Phi Ái (2013–2014)
- (Vietnam) Lư Đình Tuấn (2014–2015)
- (Vietnam) Phan Tôn Lợi (2015)
- (Vietnam) Trần Phi Ái (2015–2018)
- (Vietnam) Trương Minh Tiến (2019–2021)
- (Vietnam) Võ Thành Luân (2022–)
