= Tự Do Stadium =

Football stadium in Huế, Vietnam

Coordinates: 16.467275°N 107.597581°E

Sân vận động Tự Do
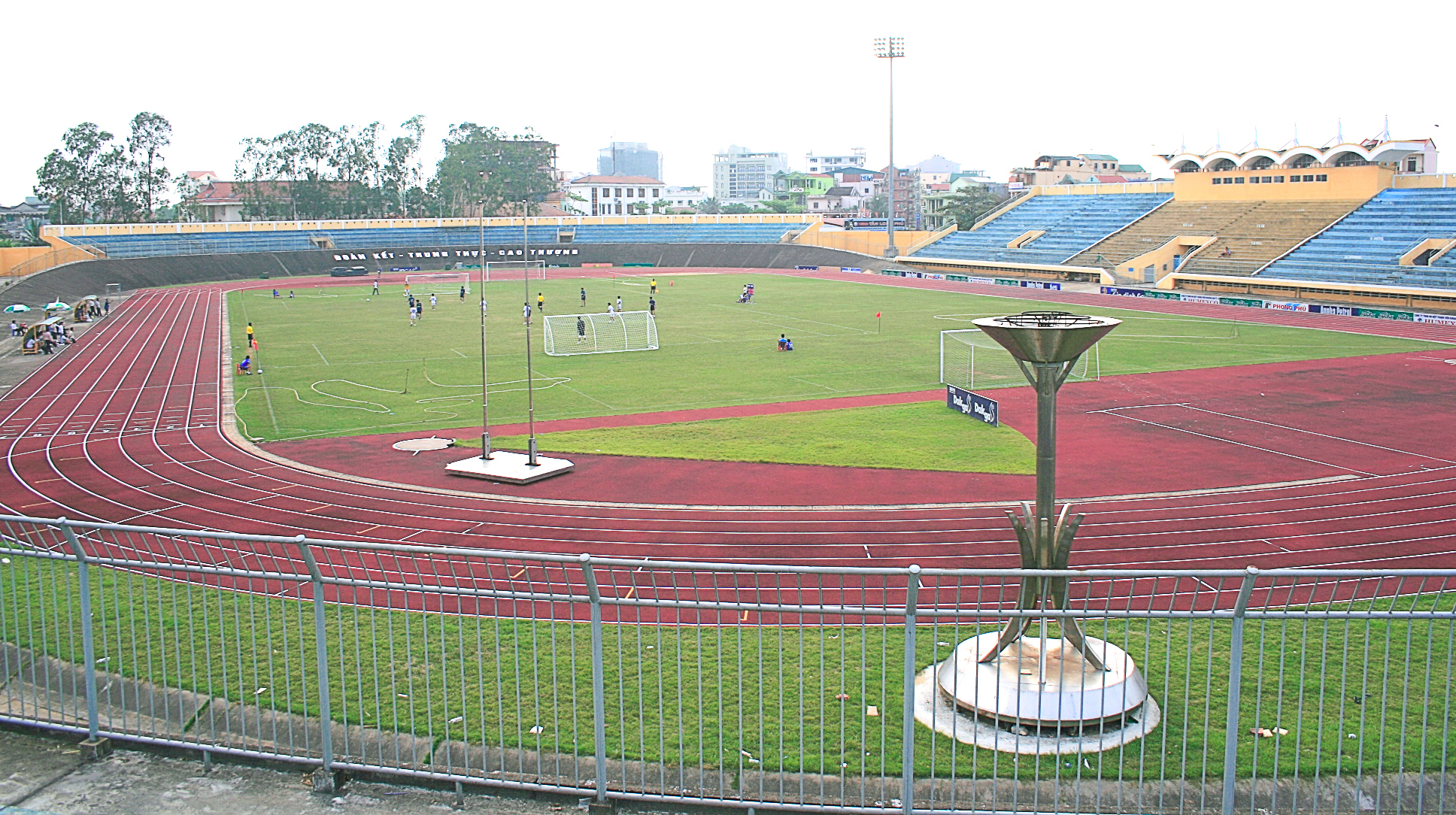
- Interactive map of Sân vận động Tự Do
- Location: Thuận Hóa ward, Huế, Vietnam
- Capacity: 25,000

Construction
- Groundbreaking: 1930
- Opened: 1932

Tenant
- Huế F.C.

Tự Do Stadium (lit. Liberty Stadium) or Sân vận động Tự Do is located in Thuận Hóa ward, Huế, Vietnam. It has a capacity of 25,000 seats. The stadium was constructed by the French colonialists in the early 1930s, at which time it was given the name "Stade Olympique de Hué". Then, the Nguyễn court renamed it Stadium Long Bao (commemorating King Bảo Đại and Queen Nam Phương's son Bảo Long).

Tự Do stadium is the home field of the football club Huda Hue F.C. (the first football club in Thừa Thiên–Huế).
