= 2026 Vietnamese Football League Third Division =

21st season of Vietnamese Third Division

Vietnamese Third Division
- Season: 2026
- Dates: 12 October – 9 November
- Champions: Đồng Tháp; Tây Mỗ
- Promoted: An Giang; Đồng Tháp; Hà Nội B Tây Mỗ
- Matches: 60
- Goals: 151 (2.52 per match)
- Biggest home win: Đồng Tháp 7–0 Hồ Chí Minh United (24 October 2026)
- Biggest away win: Hồ Chí Minh United 0–4 Đồng Tháp (8 November 2026)
- Highest scoring: Khánh Hòa B 5–3 Hồ Chí Minh United (15 October 2026)

The 2026 Vietnamese Football League Third Division (Vietnamese: Giải bóng đá hạng Ba quốc Gia 2026), was the 21st season of the Vietnamese Football League Third Division and under its league division format. The season began on 12 October and ended in 9 November 2026.

The draw was held on 30 September 2026 at 9:30 ICT.

== Teams ==
12 teams entered the league for this season. Hoàng Anh Gia Lai B initially registered to participate in the league, but withdrew two weeks before it began.

=== Team changes ===
Relegated from 2025 Second Division	Promoted to 2026 Second Division	New entries	Not engaged
~~Phu Tho~~	Phù Đổng; Công An Hà Nội B Hà Tĩnh; Trường Giang-Gia Định	Bình Định; Hà Nội B Hồ Chí Minh City United; ~~Hoàng Anh Gia Lai B~~; Hưng Khôi Hà Nội; Nam Định B Vạn Xuân Đan Phượng	Hoài Đức B Đào Hà Football Center; Luxury Hạ Long; Becamex Hồ Chí Minh City B Thống Nhất TPG Youth; Đồng Nai University of Technology; Đắk Lắk B

- Phu Tho was dissolved in 2025 after being disquafied from the Second Division for match-fixing.
- On 2 October 2026, Hưng Khôi Hà Nội changed their name to Tây Mỗ.

=== Stadiums and locations ===
Locations of the 2026 Vietnamese Third Division centralized venues

On this season, the league plays at a centralized venue on each group:

Group	Location	Stadium	Capacity
A	Hanoi	Đan Phượng Commune Stadium	8,000
B	Đồng Tháp	Tiền Giang Stadium	12,000
B	Đồng Tháp	Sơn Quy Stadium	500

=== Personnel and kits ===
Team	Location	Manager	Kit manufacturer	Shirt sponsor
An Giang	An Giang	(Vietnam) Ngô Tuấn Vinh	(Vietnam) Egan	
Bình Định	Gia Lai	(Vietnam) Lê Minh Mính	(Vietnam) HT Sport	(Vietnam) Công ty XDTH Minh Thành
Đồng Nai	Đồng Nai	(Vietnam) Nguyễn Văn Đứng	(Vietnam) Demenino Sport	
Đồng Tháp	Đồng Tháp	(Vietnam) Bùi Văn Đông	Made by club	
Hà Nội B	Hanoi	(Vietnam) Nguyễn Ngọc Dũng	Made by club	
Hà Nội Bulls	Hanoi	(England) Conor Gavigan	(Vietnam) CR Sport	(Vietnam) CR Sport
Tây Mỗ	Hanoi	(Vietnam) Trần Minh Hiếu	(Spain) Kelme	
Vạn Xuân Đan Phượng	Hanoi	(Vietnam) Nguyễn Việt Hưng	(Vietnam) Wika	
Hồ Chí Minh United	Ho Chi Minh City	TBA	(Vietnam) CR Sport	(Vietnam) CR Sport
STP FOOD Hồ Chí Minh City	Ho Chi Minh City	(Vietnam) Nguyễn Văn Long	Made by club	(Vietnam) STP Group
Khánh Hòa B	Khánh Hòa	(Vietnam) Huỳnh Hữu Đức	(Vietnam) Demenino Sport	
Nam Định B	Ninh Bình	(Vietnam) Vũ Khánh Hùng	(Japan) Jogarbola	(Vietnam) Thép Xanh Xuân Thiện

== Standings ==
12 teams is competing in the 2026 season, split into two groups of 6 teams each, playing a two-legged round-robin in a centralized venue. The group winners and runners-up team will be promoted to the Second Division.

=== Group A ===
==== Table ====
Pos	Team	Pld	W	D	L	GF	GA	GD	Pts	Promotion
1	Tây Mỗ (P)	10	7	1	2	13	5	+8	22	Promotion to Second Division
2	Hà Nội B (P)	10	6	2	2	19	12	+7	20	Promotion to Second Division
3	Vạn Xuân Đan Phượng	10	6	2	2	12	8	+4	20	
4	Hà Nội Bulls	10	4	2	4	14	11	+3	14	
5	Bình Định	10	1	2	7	7	18	−11	5	
6	Nam Định B	10	0	3	7	3	14	−11	3	

Source: VFF
Rules for classification: 1) Points; 2) Head-to-head record; 3) Goal difference; 4) Number of goals scored; 5) Number of away goals scored; 6) Disciplinary points; 7) Drawing of lots.
(Rules 3–5 only apply after home and away matches have been played between the tied teams.)
(P) Promoted

==== Results ====
Home \ Away	BDI	HAN	HNB	NDI	TMO	VXD
Bình Định	—	3–4	0–3	0–0	0–2	0–1
Hà Nội B	1–0	—	0–0	4–2	2–0	0–0
Hà Nội Bulls	3–1	3–1	—	1–0	2–3	1–2
Nam Định B	1–1	0–3	0–0	—	0–2	0–1
Tây Mỗ	2–0	3–1	1–0	1–0	—	1–1
Vạn Xuân Đan Phượng	1–2	1–3	3–1	1–0	1–0	—

Source: VFF (1st leg), VFF (2nd leg)
Legend: Blue = home team win; Yellow = draw; Red = away team win.

=== Group B ===
==== Table ====
Pos	Team	Pld	W	D	L	GF	GA	GD	Pts	Promotion
1	Đồng Tháp (P)	10	7	3	0	25	3	+22	24	Promotion to Second Division
2	An Giang (P)	10	6	2	2	12	6	+6	20	Promotion to Second Division
3	STP FOOD Hồ Chí Minh City	10	6	0	4	14	10	+4	18	
4	Đồng Nai	10	6	0	4	12	11	+1	18	
5	Khánh Hòa B	10	1	2	7	12	20	−8	5	
6	Hồ Chí Minh United	10	0	1	9	6	31	−25	1	

Source: VFF
Rules for classification: 1) Points; 2) Head-to-head record; 3) Goal difference; 4) Number of goals scored; 5) Number of away goals scored; 6) Disciplinary points; 7) Drawing of lots.
(Rules 3–5 only apply after home and away matches have been played between the tied teams.)
(P) Promoted

==== Results ====
Home \ Away	AGI	DNA	DTH	HCU	KHA	STP
An Giang	—	1–2	1–1	1–0	1–0	1–2
Đồng Nai	0–1	—	0–1	2–0	3–0	1–0
Đồng Tháp	0–0	4–0	—	7–0	3–1	2–0
Hồ Chí Minh United	0–2	0–2	0–4	—	2–2	1–2
Khánh Hòa B	1–2	1–2	1–1	5–3	—	0–1
STP FOOD Hồ Chí Minh City	0–2	3–0	0–2	4–0	2–1	—

Source: VFF (1st leg), VFF (2nd leg)
Legend: Blue = home team win; Yellow = draw; Red = away team win.
