= 2025–26 in Vietnamese football =

129th competitive association football season in Vietnam

Football in Vietnam
- Season: 2025–26

Men's football
- V.League 1: Cong An Hanoi
- V.League 2: Truong Tuoi Dong Nai
- Second Division: Hanoi FC B Hue
- Third Division: Dong Thap; Tay Mo
- Vietnamese Cup: Cong An Ho Chi Minh City
- Vietnamese Super Cup: Cong An Hanoi

Women's football
- V-Women's League: Ho Chi Minh City I
- Women's National Cup: Ho Chi Minh City

The 2025–26 season was the 129th competitive association football season in Vietnam.

== Promotion and relegation ==
=== Pre-season ===
| League | Promoted to league/New entries | Relegated from league |
|---|---|---|
| V.League 1 | Ninh Binh; PVF-CAND | Quy Nhon Binh Dinh |
| V.League 2 | Bac Ninh; Gia Dinh; Quang Ninh; Van Hien University; PVF-CAND B | Hue |
| Second Division | Phù Đổng; Công An Hà Nội B; Trường Giang-Gia Định; Hà Tĩnh | Phu Tho |
| Third Division | Bình Định Hà Nội B Hồ Chí Minh City United Hưng Khôi Hà Nội Nam Định B Vạn Xuân Đan Phượng | Phu Dong; Mekong Can Tho |

=== Post-season ===
| League | Promoted to league/New entries | Relegated from league |
|---|---|---|
| V.League 1 | Truong Tuoi Dong Nai; Bac Ninh | Becamex Ho Chi Minh City; PVF-CAND |
| V.League 2 | Thai Nguyen; Hue; Lam Dong | Ho Chi Minh City Youth |
| Second Division | An Giang; Hà Nội B; Đồng Tháp; Tây Mỗ | TBC |
| Third Division | TBC | TBC |

== National teams ==
Win Draw Loss

=== Vietnam national football team ===
==== Kits ====
| Home | Away |

==== 2027 AFC Asian Cup qualification – third round ====
===== Group F =====
| Pos | Team | Pld | W | D | L | GF | GA | GD | Pts | Qualification | (Vietnam) | (Malaysia) | (Laos) | (Nepal) |
|---|---|---|---|---|---|---|---|---|---|---|---|---|---|---|
| 1 | Vietnam | 6 | 6 | 0 | 0 | 17 | 2 | +15 | 18 | 2027 AFC Asian Cup | | 3–1 | 5–0 | 3–1 |
| 2 | Malaysia (Note: On 26 September 2025, FIFA sanctioned the Football Association of Malaysia (FAM) and seven players for using falsified eligibility documents. These players played in the match against Nepal and Vietnam. On 5 March, CAS dismissed FAM's appeal on the falsified documents case. On 17 March 2026, the AFC overturned Malaysia's wins against Nepal (on 25 March 2025) and Vietnam (on 10 June 2025) to 0–3 defeats.) | 6 | 3 | 0 | 3 | 10 | 10 | 0 | 9 | | 0–3 | | 5–1 | 0–3 |
| 3 | Laos | 6 | 2 | 0 | 4 | 4 | 16 | −12 | 6 | | 0–2 | 0–3 | | 2–1 |
| 4 | Nepal | 6 | 1 | 0 | 5 | 5 | 8 | −3 | 3 | | 0–1 | 0–1 | 0–1 | |

Source: AFC
Legend: Blue = home team win; Yellow = draw; Red = away team win.
Rules for classification: Tiebreakers
Notes:

| 9 October 2025 Group F | Vietnam | 3–1 | Nepal | Ho Chi Minh City |
| 19:30 UTC+7 | Nguyễn Tiến Linh 9'; Phạm Xuân Mạnh 67'; Nguyễn Văn Vĩ 72' | Report; Report (AFC) | Sanish 17' | Stadium: Gò Đậu Stadium; Attendance: 8,597; Referee: Choi Hyun-jai (South Korea) |

| 14 October 2025 Group F | Nepal | 0–1 | Vietnam | Ho Chi Minh City (Note: Stadiums in Nepal do not meet AFC requirements, thus Nepal are required to play their home matches at a neutral venue.) |
| 20:00 UTC+7 (Note: Match time was previously 19:30, but due to rain in Ho Chi Minh City, it was delayed for 30 minutes) | | Report; Report (AFC) | Sanish 5' (o.g.) | Stadium: Thống Nhất Stadium; Attendance: 6,870; Referee: Mohamed Khaled (Bahrain) |

| 19 November 2025 (Note: The match between Laos v Vietnam was postponed to 19 November 2025 (originally 18 November 2025) due to reasons related to organization and travel of the host team) Group F | Laos | 0–2 | Vietnam | Vientiane |
| 19:00 UTC+7 | | Report; Report (AFC) | Nguyễn Xuân Son 67' (pen.); Phạm Tuấn Hải 90+2' | Stadium: New Laos National Stadium; Attendance: 16,250; Referee: Ali Reda (Lebanon) |

| 31 March 2026 Group F | Vietnam | 3–1 | Malaysia | Ninh Bình |
| 19:00 UTC+7 | Đỗ Duy Mạnh 6'; Nguyễn Xuân Son 51', 59' | Report; Report (AFC) | Endrick 77' (pen.) | Stadium: Thiên Trường Stadium; Attendance: 19,518; Referee: Chae Sang-hyeop (South Korea) |

==== 2026 ASEAN Championship ====
===== 2026 ASEAN Championship Group A =====
| Pos | Team | Pld | W | D | L | GF | GA | GD | Pts | Qualification |
|---|---|---|---|---|---|---|---|---|---|---|
| 1 | Vietnam | 4 | 3 | 1 | 0 | 13 | 1 | +12 | 10 | Advance to knockout stage |
| 2 | Singapore | 4 | 2 | 2 | 0 | 5 | 2 | +3 | 8 | Advance to knockout stage |
| 3 | Indonesia | 4 | 2 | 1 | 1 | 9 | 5 | +4 | 7 | |
| 4 | Cambodia | 4 | 1 | 0 | 3 | 6 | 10 | −4 | 3 | |
| 5 | Timor-Leste | 4 | 0 | 0 | 4 | 0 | 15 | −15 | 0 | |

Source: ASEAN United
Rules for classification: Group stage tiebreakers

====== 2026 ASEAN Championship fixtures and results ======
| 24 July 2026 Group A | Timor-Leste | 0–7 | Vietnam | Chonburi, Thailand |
| 20:30 UTC+7 | | Report | Đỗ Hoàng Hên 7', 41'; Nguyễn Đình Bắc 31', 42', 65'; Nguyễn Xuân Son 45+1'; Nguyễn Quang Hải 79' | Stadium: Chonburi Stadium; Attendance: 195; Referee: Jin Jingyuan (China) |

| 31 July 2026 Group A | Vietnam | 0–0 | Singapore | Hanoi, Vietnam |
| 20:00 UTC+7 | | Report | | Stadium: Mỹ Đình National Stadium; Attendance: 31,569; Referee: Hiroki Kasahara (Japan) |

| 3 August 2026 Group A | Indonesia | 0–3 | Vietnam | Bogor, Indonesia |
| 20:30 UTC+7 | | Report | Nguyễn Văn Vĩ 6'; Nguyễn Hai Long 14'; Nguyễn Xuân Son 71' | Stadium: Pakansari Stadium; Attendance: 27,265; Referee: Tim Danaskos (Australia) |

| 7 August 2026 Group A | Vietnam | 3–1 | Cambodia | Hanoi, Vietnam |
| 20:00 UTC+7 | Nguyễn Đình Bắc 18', 89'; Vakhim 84' (o.g.) | Report | Bento 71' | Stadium: Mỹ Đình National Stadium; Attendance: 19,628; Referee: Cheung Wai Lung Mario (Hong Kong) |

| 16 August 2026 Semi-finals 1st leg | Malaysia | 0–2 | Vietnam | Kuala Lumpur, Malaysia |
| 21:00 UTC+8 | | Report | Nguyễn Xuân Son 45+5'; Faris Danish 86' (o.g.) | Stadium: Kuala Lumpur Stadium; Attendance: 10,141; Referee: Rustam Lutfullin (Uzbekistan) |

| 19 August 2026 Semi-finals 2nd leg | Vietnam | 2–0 (4–0 agg.) | Malaysia | Hanoi, Vietnam |
| 20:00 UTC+7 | Nguyễn Xuân Son 62', 89' | Report | | Stadium: Mỹ Đình National Stadium; Attendance: 37,906; Referee: Yusuke Ohashi (Japan) |

| 22 August 2026 Final 1st leg | Thailand | 0–2 | Vietnam | Bangkok, Thailand |
| 20:00 UTC+7 | | Report | Nguyễn Hai Long 66'; Nguyễn Quang Hải 69' | Stadium: Rajamangala Stadium; Attendance: 26,415; Referee: Sami Al-Ismail (Saudi Arabia) |

| 26 August 2026 Final 2nd leg | Vietnam | 2–2 (4–2 agg.) | Thailand | Hanoi, Vietnam |
| 20:00 UTC+7 | Chatchai 52' (o.g.); Wanchai 90+3' (o.g.) | Report | Yotsakorn 12'; Wanchai 85' | Stadium: Mỹ Đình National Stadium; Attendance: 38,646; Referee: Ahmed Eisa Darwish (United Arab Emirates) |

===== Friendly matches =====
| 26 March 2026 Friendly | Vietnam | 3–0 | Bangladesh | Hanoi |
| 19:00 UTC+7 | Phạm Tuấn Hải 8'; Phạm Xuân Mạnh 18'; Nguyễn Hai Long 38' | Report | | Stadium: Hàng Đẫy Stadium; Referee: Cheung Wai Lung Mario (Hong Kong) |

| 18 July 2026 Friendly | Vietnam | 4–0 | Myanmar | Thái Nguyên |
| 19:00 UTC+7 | Nguyễn Xuân Son 5'; Phạm Xuân Mạnh 39'; Đỗ Hoàng Hên 59'; Nguyễn Đình Bắc 90+1' (pen.) | Report | | Stadium: Thái Nguyên Stadium; Referee: Torphong Somsing (Thailand) |

=== Vietnam women's national football team ===
==== Kits ====
| Home | Away |

==== 2026 AFC Women's Asian Cup ====
===== 2026 AFC Women's Asian Cup Group C =====
| Pos | Team | Pld | W | D | L | GF | GA | GD | Pts | Qualification |
|---|---|---|---|---|---|---|---|---|---|---|
| 1 | Japan | 3 | 3 | 0 | 0 | 17 | 0 | +17 | 9 | Advance to knockout stage |
| 2 | Chinese Taipei | 3 | 2 | 0 | 1 | 4 | 3 | +1 | 6 | Advance to knockout stage |
| 3 | Vietnam | 3 | 1 | 0 | 2 | 2 | 6 | −4 | 3 | |
| 4 | India | 3 | 0 | 0 | 3 | 2 | 16 | −14 | 0 | |

Source: AFC

====== 2026 AFC Women's Asian Cup fixtures and results ======
| 4 March 2026 Group C | Vietnam | 2–1 | India | Perth, Australia |
| 19:00 UTC+8 (18:00 UTC+7) | Ngân Thị Vạn Sự 30', 90+4' | Report (FIFA) | Nongrum 52' | Stadium: Perth Rectangular Stadium; Attendance: 1,961; Referee: Kim Yu-jeong (South Korea) |

| 7 March 2026 Group C | Chinese Taipei | 1–0 | Vietnam | Perth, Australia |
| 13:00 UTC+8 (12:00 UTC+7) | Su Yu-hsuan 26' | Report (AFC); Report (FIFA) | | Stadium: Perth Rectangular Stadium; Attendance: 1,784; Referee: Lara Lee (Australia) |

| 10 March 2026 Group C | Japan | 4–0 | Vietnam | Perth, Australia |
| 17:00 UTC+8 (16:00 UTC+7) | Ueki 21'; Hamano 51'; Fujino 64'; Seike 67' | Report (AFC); Report (FIFA) | | Stadium: Perth Rectangular Stadium; Attendance: 3,648; Referee: Kim Yu-jeong (South Korea) |

====== Group E ======
| Pos | Team | Pld | W | D | L | GF | GA | GD | Pts | Qualification |
|---|---|---|---|---|---|---|---|---|---|---|
| 1 | Vietnam (H) | 3 | 3 | 0 | 0 | 17 | 0 | +17 | 9 | Final tournament |
| 2 | United Arab Emirates | 3 | 1 | 1 | 1 | 5 | 6 | −1 | 4 | |
| 3 | Guam | 3 | 1 | 1 | 1 | 3 | 4 | −1 | 4 | |
| 4 | Maldives | 3 | 0 | 0 | 3 | 0 | 15 | −15 | 0 | |

Source: AFC
Rules for classification: Qualification tiebreakers
(H) Hosts

| 29 June 2025 Group E | Vietnam | 7–0 | Maldives | Phú Thọ |
| 19:00 UTC+7 | Ngân Thị Vạn Sự 7', 11'; Nguyễn Thị Bích Thùy 14'; Nguyễn Thị Vạn 25'; Nguyễn Thị Mỹ Anh 30'; Ngọc Minh Chuyên 44'; Phạm Hải Yến 67' | Report | | Stadium: Việt Trì Stadium; Referee: Dong Fangyu (China) |

| 2 July 2025 Group E | United Arab Emirates | 0–6 | Vietnam | Phú Thọ |
| 19:00 UTC+7 | | | Chương Thị Kiều 11'; Thái Thị Thảo 14'; Nguyễn Thị Vạn 43', 51'; Phạm Hải Yến 64'; Ngân Thị Vạn Sự 90+5' | Stadium: Việt Trì Stadium; Referee: Dong Fangyu (China) |

| 5 July 2025 Group E | Vietnam | 4–0 | Guam | Phú Thọ |
| 19:00 UTC+7 | Nguyễn Thị Vạn 1'; Nguyễn Thị Bích Thùy 13', 25'; Lê Thị Diễm My 73' | Report | | Stadium: Việt Trì Stadium; Referee: Alesar Baddour (Syria) |

==== 2025 ASEAN Women's Championship ====
===== 2025 ASEAN Women's Championship Group A =====
| Pos | Team | Pld | W | D | L | GF | GA | GD | Pts | Qualification |
|---|---|---|---|---|---|---|---|---|---|---|
| 1 | Vietnam (H) | 3 | 3 | 0 | 0 | 14 | 0 | +14 | 9 | Advance to knockout stage |
| 2 | Thailand | 3 | 2 | 0 | 1 | 14 | 1 | +13 | 6 | Advance to knockout stage |
| 3 | Cambodia | 3 | 0 | 1 | 2 | 1 | 14 | −13 | 1 | |
| 4 | Indonesia | 3 | 0 | 1 | 2 | 1 | 15 | −14 | 1 | |

Source: ASEAN United FC
Rules for classification: Group stage tiebreakers
(H) Hosts

====== 2025 ASEAN Women's Championship fixtures and results ======
| 6 August 2025 Group A | Vietnam | 6–0 | Cambodia | Haiphong, Vietnam |
| 19:30 UTC+7 | Dương Thị Vân 7'; Ngân Thị Vạn Sự 11'; Phạm Hải Yến 14' (pen.); Nguyễn Thị Vạn 17'; Nguyễn Thị Trúc Hương 51'; Thái Thị Thảo 60' | | | Stadium: Lạch Tray Stadium; Referee: Muhammad Izzul (Malaysia) |

| 9 August 2025 Group A | Indonesia | 0–7 | Vietnam | Haiphong, Vietnam |
| 19:30 UTC+7 | | Report | Nguyễn Thị Bích Thùy 25'; Hoàng Thị Loan 28'; Phạm Hải Yến 69', 85'; Ngân Thị Vạn Sự 71'; Trần Thị Thu Thảo 81'; Nguyễn Thị Tuyết Dung 89' | Stadium: Lạch Tray Stadium; Referee: Asker Nadjafaliev (Uzbekistan) |

| 12 August 2025 Group A | Vietnam | 1–0 | Thailand | Haiphong, Vietnam |
| 19:30 UTC+7 | Trần Thị Thu Thảo 36' | Report | | Stadium: Lạch Tray Stadium; Referee: Rustam Lutfullin (Uzbekistan) |

| 16 August 2025 Semi-finals | Vietnam | 1–2 | Australia | Haiphong, Vietnam |
| 20:00 UTC+7 | Nguyễn Thị Bích Thùy 88' | Report | Keane 7'; McKenna 16' | Stadium: Lạch Tray Stadium; Attendance: 16,890; Referee: Yoshimi Yamashita (Japan) |

| 19 August 2025 Third place play-off | Vietnam | 3–1 | Thailand | Haiphong, Vietnam |
| 16:30 UTC+7 | Phạm Hải Yến 45'; Huỳnh Như 65'; Nguyễn Thị Bích Thùy 68' | Report | Kwaenkasikarm 87' | Stadium: Lạch Tray Stadium; Attendance: 11,978; Referee: Kim Yu-jeong (South Korea) |

==== 2025 SEA Games ====
===== 2025 SEA Games Group B =====
| Pos | Team | Pld | W | D | L | GF | GA | GD | Pts | Qualification |
|---|---|---|---|---|---|---|---|---|---|---|
| 1 | Vietnam | 3 | 2 | 0 | 1 | 9 | 1 | +8 | 6 | Advance to knockout stage |
| 2 | Philippines | 3 | 2 | 0 | 1 | 8 | 2 | +6 | 6 | Advance to knockout stage |
| 3 | Myanmar | 3 | 2 | 0 | 1 | 5 | 3 | +2 | 6 | |
| 4 | Malaysia | 3 | 0 | 0 | 3 | 0 | 16 | −16 | 0 | |

Source: Soccerway

====== 2025 SEA Games fixtures and results ======
| 5 December 2025 Group B | Vietnam | 7–0 | Malaysia | Chonburi, Thailand |
| 19:30 UTC+7 | Phạm Hải Yến 4', 26'; Nguyễn Thị Bích Thùy 23'; Trần Thị Hải Linh 36'; Thái Thị Thảo 48', 59', 78' | Report | | Stadium: IPE Chonburi Stadium; Referee: Rawdha Almansoori (United Arab Emirates) |

| 8 December 2025 Group B | Philippines | 1–0 | Vietnam | Chonburi, Thailand |
| 19:30 UTC+7 | Ramirez 90+4' | Report | | Stadium: IPE Chonburi Stadium; Referee: Gulshoda Saidqulova (Uzbekistan) |

| 11 December 2025 Group B | Vietnam | 2–0 | Myanmar | Chonburi, Thailand |
| 16:00 UTC+7 | Ngân Thị Vạn Sự 8'; Nguyễn Thị Bích Thùy 14' | Report | | Stadium: IPE Chonburi Stadium; Referee: Esraa Almbaidin (Jordan) |

| 14 December 2025 Semi-finals | Vietnam | 5–0 | Indonesia | Chonburi, Thailand |
| 16:00 UTC+7 | Nguyễn Thị Bích Thùy 28' (pen.), 80'; Phạm Hải Yến 49', 58'; Huỳnh Như 86' | Report | | Stadium: IPE Chonburi Stadium; Referee: Alesar Baddour (Syria) |

| 17 December 2025 Gold medal match | Philippines | 0–0 (a.e.t.) (6–5 p) | Vietnam | Chonburi, Thailand |
| 19:30 UTC+7 | | Report | | Stadium: Chonburi Stadium; Referee: Rebecca Durcau (Australia) |
| | Penalties |
| | Guy (penalty scored); Pino (penalty scored); Long (penalty scored); Beard (penalty scored); Markey (penalty scored); Sawicki (penalty scored) | | (penalty scored) Huỳnh Như; (penalty scored) Ngọc Minh Chuyên; (penalty scored) Nguyễn Thị Trúc Hương; (penalty scored) Hoàng Thị Loan; (penalty scored) Cù Thị Huỳnh Như; (penalty missed) Trần Thị Thu |

===== Friendly matches =====
| 27 January 2026 Friendly | Vietnam | 1–0 | Uzbekistan | Hanoi |
| --:-- UTC+7 | Nguyễn Thị Bích Thùy 59' | Report |

| 30 January 2026 Friendly | Vietnam | 2–6 | Uzbekistan | Hanoi |
| --:-- UTC+7 |

| 10 February 2026 Friendly | China | 2–0 | Vietnam | Shenzhen, China |
| 19:00 UTC+8 (18:00 UTC+7) | ? 30'; ? 46' | Report | | Stadium: Shenzhen Youth Football Training Base Centre Stadium |

| 13 February 2026 Friendly | China | 6–1 | Vietnam | Shenzhen, China |
| --:-- UTC+8 (--:-- UTC+7) | ?; ?; ?; ?; ?; ? | Report | Nguyễn Thị Thanh Nhã | Stadium: Shenzhen Youth Football Training Base Centre Stadium |

== Youth teams ==
=== Men ===
==== U-23 ====
===== 2025 ASEAN U-23 Championship =====
====== 2025 ASEAN U-23 Championship Group B ======
| Pos | Team | Pld | W | D | L | GF | GA | GD | Pts | Qualification |
|---|---|---|---|---|---|---|---|---|---|---|
| 1 | Vietnam | 2 | 2 | 0 | 0 | 5 | 1 | +4 | 6 | Advance to knockout stage |
| 2 | Cambodia | 2 | 0 | 1 | 1 | 2 | 3 | −1 | 1 | |
| 3 | Laos | 2 | 0 | 1 | 1 | 1 | 4 | −3 | 1 | |

Source: ASEAN United FC
Rules for classification: Group stage tiebreakers

====== 2025 ASEAN U-23 Championship fixtures and results ======
| 19 July 2025 Group B | Laos | 0–3 | Vietnam | Bekasi, Indonesia |
| 17:00 UTC+7 | | Report | Khuất Văn Khang 19'; Nguyễn Hiểu Minh 71', 84' | Stadium: Patriot Chandrabhaga Stadium; Referee: Muhammad Usaid Jamal (Malaysia) |

| 22 July 2025 Group B | Vietnam | 2–1 | Cambodia | Jakarta, Indonesia |
| 20:00 UTC+7 | Phạm Lý Đức 35'; Nguyễn Đình Bắc 85' | Report | Rado 62' | Stadium: Gelora Bung Karno Stadium; Referee: Mohd Zulfiqar (Singapore) |

| 25 July 2025 Semi-finals | Vietnam | 2–1 | Philippines | Jakarta, Indonesia |
| 16:00 UTC+7 | Nguyễn Đình Bắc 41'; Nguyễn Xuân Bắc 54' | Report | Mariona 36' | Stadium: Gelora Bung Karno Stadium; Referee: Mohd Usaid Jamal (Malaysia) |

| 29 July 2025 Final | Vietnam | 1–0 | Indonesia | Jakarta, Indonesia |
| 20:00 UTC+7 | Nguyễn Công Phương 37' | Report | | Stadium: Gelora Bung Karno Stadium; Attendance: 35,592; Referee: Koji Takasaki (Japan) |

===== 2026 AFC U-23 Asian Cup =====
====== 2026 AFC U-23 Asian Cup Group A ======
| Pos | Team | Pld | W | D | L | GF | GA | GD | Pts | Qualification |
|---|---|---|---|---|---|---|---|---|---|---|
| 1 | Vietnam | 3 | 3 | 0 | 0 | 5 | 1 | +4 | 9 | Advance to knockout stage |
| 2 | Jordan | 3 | 2 | 0 | 1 | 4 | 4 | 0 | 6 | Advance to knockout stage |
| 3 | Saudi Arabia (H) | 3 | 1 | 0 | 2 | 3 | 4 | −1 | 3 | |
| 4 | Kyrgyzstan | 3 | 0 | 0 | 3 | 1 | 4 | −3 | 0 | |

Source: AFC
(H) Hosts

====== 2026 AFC U-23 Asian Cup fixtures and results ======
| 6 January 2026 Group A | Vietnam | 2–0 | Jordan | Jeddah, Saudi Arabia |
| 14:30 UTC+3 (18:30 UTC+7) | Nguyễn Đình Bắc 15' (pen.); Nguyễn Hiểu Minh 42' | Report | | Stadium: King Abdullah Sports City Hall Stadium; Attendance: 219; Referee: Choi Hyun-jai (South Korea) |

| 9 January 2026 Group A | Kyrgyzstan | 1–2 | Vietnam | Jeddah, Saudi Arabia |
| 17:00 UTC+3 (21:00 UTC+7) | Murzakhmatov 44' | Report | Khuất Văn Khang 19' (pen.); Brauzman 87' (o.g.) | Stadium: King Abdullah Sports City Hall Stadium; Attendance: 346; Referee: Payam Heydari (Iran) |

| 12 January 2026 Group A | Saudi Arabia | 0–1 | Vietnam | Jeddah, Saudi Arabia |
| 19:30 UTC+3 (23:30 UTC+7) | | Report | Nguyễn Đình Bắc 64' | Stadium: Prince Abdullah Al-Faisal Sports City Stadium; Attendance: 4,919; Referee: Alex King (Australia) |

| 16 January 2026 Quarter-finals | Vietnam | 3–2 (a.e.t.) | United Arab Emirates | Jeddah, Saudi Arabia |
| 18:30 UTC+3 (22:30 UTC+7) | Nguyễn Lê Phát 39'; Nguyễn Đình Bắc 62'; Phạm Minh Phúc 101' | Report | Ndiaye 42'; Al-Menhali 68' | Stadium: Prince Abdullah Al-Faisal Sports City Stadium; Attendance: 211; Referee: Payam Heydari (Iran) |

| 20 January 2026 Semi-finals | Vietnam | 0–3 | China | Jeddah, Saudi Arabia |
| 18:30 UTC+3 (22:30 UTC+7) | | Report | Peng Xiao 47'; Xiang Yuwang 52'; Wang Yudong 90+8' | Stadium: Prince Abdullah Al-Faisal Sports City Stadium; Attendance: 1,141; Referee: Alex King (Australia) |

| 23 January 2026 Third place play-off | Vietnam | 2–2 (a.e.t.) (7–6 p) | South Korea | Jeddah, Saudi Arabia |
| 18:00 UTC+3 (22:00 UTC+7) | Nguyễn Quốc Việt 30'; Nguyễn Đình Bắc 71' | Report | Kim Tae-won 69'; Shin Min-ha 90+7' | Stadium: King Abdullah Sports City Hall Stadium; Attendance: 270; Referee: Abdullah Jamali (Kuwait) |
| | Penalties |
| | Khuất Văn Khang (penalty scored); Phạm Minh Phúc (penalty scored); Nguyễn Thái Quốc Cường (penalty scored); Nguyễn Ngọc Mỹ (penalty scored); Nguyễn Nhật Minh (penalty scored); Nguyễn Xuân Bắc (penalty scored); Nguyễn Thanh Nhàn (penalty scored) | | (penalty scored) Kim Tae-won; (penalty scored) Kang Seong-jin; (penalty scored) Lee Chan-wook; (penalty scored) Kim Yong-hak; (penalty scored) Lee Hyun-yong; (penalty scored) Jang Seok-hwan; (penalty missed) Bae Hyun-seo |

===== 2026 AFC U-23 Asian Cup qualification =====
====== Group C ======
| Pos | Team | Pld | W | D | L | GF | GA | GD | Pts | Qualification |
|---|---|---|---|---|---|---|---|---|---|---|
| 1 | Vietnam (H) | 3 | 3 | 0 | 0 | 4 | 0 | +4 | 9 | Final tournament |
| 2 | Yemen | 3 | 2 | 0 | 1 | 3 | 2 | +1 | 6 | |
| 3 | Bangladesh | 3 | 1 | 0 | 2 | 4 | 4 | 0 | 3 | |
| 4 | Singapore | 3 | 0 | 0 | 3 | 2 | 7 | −5 | 0 | |

Source: AFC
Rules for classification: Qualification tiebreakers
(H) Hosts

| 3 September 2025 Group C | Vietnam | 2–0 | Bangladesh | Phú Thọ |
| 19:00 UTC+7 | Nguyễn Ngọc Mỹ 16'; Viktor Le 84' | Report | | Stadium: Việt Trì Stadium; Attendance: 3,019; Referee: Resul Mämmedow (Turkmenistan) |

| 6 September 2025 Group C | Singapore | 0–1 | Vietnam | Phú Thọ |
| 19:00 UTC+7 | | Report | Lê Văn Thuận 79' | Stadium: Việt Trì Stadium; Attendance: 6,046; Referee: Choi Hyun-jai (South Korea) |

| 9 September 2025 Group C | Vietnam | 1–0 | Yemen | Phú Thọ |
| 19:00 UTC+7 | Nguyễn Thanh Nhàn 70' | Report | | Stadium: Việt Trì Stadium; Attendance: 6,879; Referee: Thoriq Alkatiri (Indonesia) |

===== 2025 SEA Games =====
====== 2025 SEA Games Group B ======
| Pos | Team | Pld | W | D | L | GF | GA | GD | Pts | Qualification |
|---|---|---|---|---|---|---|---|---|---|---|
| 1 | Vietnam | 2 | 2 | 0 | 0 | 4 | 1 | +3 | 6 | Advance to knockout stage |
| 2 | Malaysia | 2 | 1 | 0 | 1 | 4 | 3 | +1 | 3 | Advance to knockout stage |
| 3 | Laos | 2 | 0 | 0 | 2 | 2 | 6 | −4 | 0 | |

Source: Soccerway
Rules for classification: Group stage tiebreakers

====== 2025 SEA Games fixtures and results ======
| 3 December 2025 Group B | Vietnam | 2–1 | Laos | Bangkok, Thailand (Note: Originally planned to be held in Tinsulanon Stadium, but moved to Rajamangala Stadium due to the Cyclone Senyar hits Songkhla province) |
| 16:00 UTC+7 | Khampane 33' | Report | Nguyễn Đình Bắc 28', 60' | Stadium: Rajamangala Stadium; Referee: Rustam Lutfullin (Uzbekistan) |

| 11 December 2025 Group B | Vietnam | 2–0 | Malaysia | Bangkok, Thailand |
| 16:00 UTC+7 | Nguyễn Hiểu Minh 11'; Phạm Minh Phúc 22' | Report | | Stadium: Rajamangala Stadium; Referee: Qasim Al-Hatmi (Qatar) |

| 15 December 2025 Semi-finals | Vietnam | 2–0 | Philippines | Bangkok, Thailand |
| 15:30 UTC+7 | Lê Văn Thuận 89'; Nguyễn Thanh Nhàn 90+2' | Report | | Stadium: Rajamangala Stadium; Referee: Choi Hyun-jai (South Korea) |

| 18 December 2025 Gold medal match | Thailand | 2–3 (a.e.t.) | Vietnam | Bangkok, Thailand |
| 19:30 UTC+7 | Yotsakorn B. 20'; Seksan 31' | Report | Nguyễn Đình Bắc 49' (pen.); Waris 60' (o.g.); Nguyễn Thanh Nhàn 96' | Stadium: Rajamangala Stadium; Attendance: 17,736; Referee: Mooud Bonyadifard (Iran) |

===== Friendly tournaments =====
====== 2025 Panda Cup ======
| Pos | Team | Pld | W | D | L | GF | GA | GD | Pts | |
|---|---|---|---|---|---|---|---|---|---|---|
| 1 | South Korea | 3 | 2 | 0 | 1 | 3 | 2 | +1 | 6 | Champions |
| 2 | China (H) | 3 | 1 | 1 | 1 | 2 | 1 | +1 | 4 | Runners-up |
| 3 | Uzbekistan | 3 | 1 | 1 | 1 | 1 | 2 | −1 | 4 | Third place |
| 4 | Vietnam | 3 | 1 | 0 | 2 | 1 | 2 | −1 | 3 | Fourth place |

Source: CFA
Rules for classification: 1) points; 2) goal difference; 3) goals scored; 4) head-to-head points; 5) head-to-head goal difference; 6) head-to-head number of goals scored; 7) Disciplinary points (yellow card = 1 point, red card as a result of two yellow cards = 3 points, direct red card = 3 points, yellow card followed by direct red card = 4 points).
(H) Hosts

| 12 November 2025 Panda Cup | China | 0–1 | Vietnam | Chengdu, China |
| 19:35 UTC+8 (18:35 UTC+7) | Phạm Minh Phúc 81' | Report | | Stadium: Shuangliu Sports Centre; Attendance: 4,137; Referee: Shen Yinhao (China) |

| 15 November 2025 Panda Cup | Uzbekistan | 1–0 | Vietnam | Chengdu, China |
| 15:30 UTC+8 (14:30 UTC+7) | Khamidov 4' | Report | | Stadium: Shuangliu Sports Centre |

| 18 November 2025 Panda Cup | Vietnam | 0–1 | South Korea | Chengdu, China |
| 15:30 UTC+8 (14:30 UTC+7) | | Report | Kim Myung-jun 35' | Stadium: Shuangliu Sports Centre |

====== 2026 CFA Team China Cup ======
| Pos | Team | Pld | W | D | L | GF | GA | GD | Pts | |
|---|---|---|---|---|---|---|---|---|---|---|
| 1 | North Korea | 3 | 1 | 2 | 0 | 5 | 3 | +2 | 5 | Champions |
| 2 | China (H) | 3 | 1 | 2 | 0 | 4 | 3 | +1 | 5 | Runners-up |
| 3 | Thailand | 3 | 1 | 1 | 1 | 4 | 5 | −1 | 4 | Third place |
| 4 | Vietnam | 3 | 0 | 1 | 2 | 1 | 3 | −2 | 1 | Fourth place |

Source: CFA
Rules for classification: 1) points; 2) goal difference; 3) goals scored; 4) head-to-head points; 5) head-to-head goal difference; 6) head-to-head number of goals scored; 7) Disciplinary points (yellow card = 1 point, red card as a result of two yellow cards = 3 points, direct red card = 3 points, yellow card followed by direct red card = 4 points).
(H) Hosts

| 25 March 2026 CFA Team China – Xi'an | Vietnam | 1–1 | North Korea | Xi'an, China |
| 15:00 UTC+8 (14:00 UTC+7) | Nguyễn Minh Tâm 6' | Report | An Kyong-ung 80' | Stadium: Fengdong Football Park East Stadium |

| 28 March 2026 CFA Team China – Xi'an | Thailand | 1–0 | Vietnam | Xi'an, China |
| 15:00 UTC+8 (14:00 UTC+7) | Thanakrit 1' | Report | | Stadium: Fengdong Football Park East Stadium; Referee: Ma Ning (China) |

| 31 March 2026 CFA Team China – Xi'an | China | 1–0 | Vietnam | Xi'an, China |
| 19:35 UTC+8 (18:35 UTC+7) | Du Yuezheng 39' | Report | | Stadium: Xi'an International Football Center; Attendance: 16,163; Referee: Tang Shunqi (China) |

===== Friendly matches =====
| 2 July 2025 Friendly | Vietnam | 5–0 | Chinese Taipei | Ho Chi Minh City |
| 17:00 UTC+7 | Nguyễn Phi Hoàng 9'; Nguyễn Văn Trường 36'; Nguyễn Quốc Việt 45'; Lê Văn Thuận 68'; Viktor Le 79' | Report | | Stadium: Bà Rịa Stadium; Attendance: 0 |

| 4 July 2025 Friendly | Vietnam | 2–1 | Chinese Taipei | Ho Chi Minh City |
| --:-- UTC+7 | Khuất Văn Khang 9'; Nguyễn Quốc Việt 55' | Report | ? 14' | Stadium: Bà Rịa Stadium |

| 9 October 2025 Friendly | Vietnam | 0–1 | Qatar | Abu Dhabi |
| 19:00 UTC+4 (22:00 UTC+7) | | Report | ? 75' | Stadium: 321 Sports |

| 13 October 2025 Friendly | Qatar | 3–2 | Vietnam | Abu Dhabi |
| 19:00 UTC+4 (22:00 UTC+7) | 10' (pen.); 20'; 78' | Report | Lê Văn Thuận 24'; Nguyễn Quốc Việt 68' | Stadium: 321Sports |

| 30 December 2025 Friendly | Syria | 2–1 | Vietnam | Doha |
| 15:00 UTC+3 (19:00 UTC+7) | ? 41'; ? 58' | Report | Nguyễn Lê Phát 87' | Stadium: Hamad bin Khalifa Stadium |

==== U-20/U-19/U-18 ====
===== 2026 ASEAN U-19 Boys' Championship =====
====== 2026 ASEAN U-19 Boys' Championship Group A ======
| Pos | Team | Pld | W | D | L | GF | GA | GD | Pts | Qualification |
|---|---|---|---|---|---|---|---|---|---|---|
| 1 | Indonesia (H) | 3 | 3 | 0 | 0 | 8 | 1 | +7 | 9 | Knockout stage |
| 2 | Vietnam | 3 | 2 | 0 | 1 | 9 | 2 | +7 | 6 | |
| 3 | Myanmar | 3 | 1 | 0 | 2 | 3 | 9 | −6 | 3 | |
| 4 | Timor-Leste | 3 | 0 | 0 | 3 | 1 | 9 | −8 | 0 | |

Source: AFF
Rules for classification: Group stage tiebreakers
(H) Hosts

====== 2026 ASEAN U-19 Boys' Championship fixtures and results ======
| 1 June 2026 Group A | Vietnam | 3–0 | Timor-Leste | North Sumatra, Indonesia |
| 16:00 UTC+7 | Hoàng Công Hậu 2', 83', 90+1' | Report | | Stadium: North Sumatra Stadium; Referee: Alongkorn Khonwai (Thailand) |

| 4 June 2026 Group A | Myanmar | 0–5 | Vietnam | North Sumatra, Indonesia |
| 16:00 UTC+7 | Lê Tấn Dũng 28'; Hoàng Công Hậu 45+1'; Nguyễn Văn Bách 49'; Hoàng Trọng Duy Khang 53' (pen.); Nguyễn Thiên Phú 84' | Report | | Stadium: North Sumatra Stadium; Referee: Zakaria Ismail (Malaysia) |

| 7 June 2026 Group A | Indonesia | 2–1 | Vietnam | North Sumatra, Indonesia |
| 20:00 UTC+7 | Reno 22'; Evandra 90+1' (pen.) | Report | Nguyễn Quốc Khánh 74' | Stadium: North Sumatra Stadium; Referee: Ryo Tanimoto (Japan) |

===== 2025 Seoul EOU Cup =====
====== 2025 Seoul EOU Cup Group A ======
| Pos | Team | Pld | W | D | L | GF | GA | GD | Pts | Qualification |
|---|---|---|---|---|---|---|---|---|---|---|
| 1 | (South Korea) K League Youth | 3 | 2 | 1 | 0 | 9 | 3 | +6 | 7 | Advance to the final match |
| 2 | (Japan) Kanto University | 3 | 2 | 0 | 1 | 7 | 4 | +3 | 6 | Advance to the third place match |
| 3 | Vietnam U18 | 3 | 1 | 0 | 2 | 5 | 6 | −1 | 3 | |
| 4 | (China) Zhejiang U18 | 3 | 0 | 1 | 2 | 2 | 10 | −8 | 1 | |

Source: Instagram
Rules for classification: 1) Points; 2) Goal difference; 3) Goals scored; 4) Head-to-head result; 5) Fair play ranking.

====== 2025 Seoul EOU Cup fixtures and results ======
| 20 September 2025 Group A | K League Youth (South Korea) | 5–1 | Vietnam | Seoul, South Korea |
| 19:00 UTC+9 (17:00 UTC+7) | Lee Ho-jin 7', 36', 60'; Lee Yong-jae 88'; Lee Hwan-hee 78' | Report | Đào Quang Anh 24' | Stadium: Seoul World Cup Auxiliary Stadium |

| 22 September 2025 Group A | Kanto University (Japan) | 1–0 | Vietnam | Seoul, South Korea |
| 16:00 UTC+9 (14:00 UTC+7) | Fukumotto 46' | Report | | Stadium: Seoul World Cup Auxiliary Stadium |

| 24 September 2025 Group A | Zhejiang U18 (China) | 0–4 | Vietnam | Seoul, South Korea |
| 16:00 UTC+9 (14:00 UTC+7) | | Report | Nguyễn Thiên Phú 6'; Đậu Hồng Phong 23'; Nguyễn Lê Phát 62'; Nguyễn Thành Long 81' | Stadium: Seoul World Cup Auxiliary Stadium |

==== U-17/U-16 ====
===== 2026 AFC U-17 Asian Cup =====
====== 2026 AFC U-17 Asian Cup Group C ======
| Pos | Team | Pld | W | D | L | GF | GA | GD | Pts | Qualification |
|---|---|---|---|---|---|---|---|---|---|---|
| 1 | Vietnam | 3 | 2 | 0 | 1 | 5 | 6 | −1 | 6 | Knockout stage and FIFA U-17 World Cup |
| 2 | South Korea | 3 | 1 | 2 | 0 | 5 | 2 | +3 | 5 | Knockout stage and FIFA U-17 World Cup |
| 3 | Yemen | 3 | 1 | 1 | 1 | 3 | 3 | 0 | 4 | |
| 4 | United Arab Emirates | 3 | 0 | 1 | 2 | 5 | 7 | −2 | 1 | |

Source: AFC
Rules for classification: Group stage tiebreakers

====== 2026 AFC U-17 Asian Cup fixtures and results ======
| 6 May 2026 (7 May 2026) Group C | Yemen | 0–1 | Vietnam | Jeddah, Saudi Arabia |
| 20:00 UTC+3 (00:00 UTC+7) | | Report | Đậu Quang Hưng 77' | Stadium: King Abdullah Sports City Hall Stadium; Attendance: 312; Referee: Harish Kundu (India) |

| 10 May 2026 Group C | Vietnam | 1–4 | South Korea | Jeddah, Saudi Arabia |
| 19:00 UTC+3 (23:00 UTC+7) | Lê Sỹ Bách 33' | Report | An Sun-hyun 84'; Ian Nam 86'; Ahn Joo-wan 88' | Stadium: King Abdullah Sports City Training Stadium (Pitch C); Attendance: 100; Referee: Du Jianxin (China) |

| 13 May 2026 (14 May 2026) Group C | Vietnam | 3–2 | United Arab Emirates | Jeddah, Saudi Arabia |
| 20:00 UTC+3 (00:00 UTC+7) | Chu Ngọc Nguyễn Lực 41'; Nguyễn Văn Dương 48'; Nguyễn Mạnh Cường 69' | Report | Al-Mheiri 1'; Mahrous 56' | Stadium: King Abdullah Sports City Hall Stadium; Attendance: 92; Referee: Wiwat Jumpao-on (Thailand) |

| 16 May 2026 (17 May 2026) Quarter-finals | Vietnam | 0–3 | Australia | Jeddah, Saudi Arabia |
| 20:00 UTC+3 (00:00 UTC+7) | | Report | O'Carroll 40'; Hassarati 60'; Gerald 75' | Stadium: King Abdullah Sports City Training Stadium (Pitch A); Attendance: 25; Referee: Sultan Al-Hammadi (United Arab Emirates) |

===== 2026 AFC U-17 Asian Cup qualification =====
====== Group C ======
| Pos | Team | Pld | W | D | L | GF | GA | GD | Pts | Qualification |
|---|---|---|---|---|---|---|---|---|---|---|
| 1 | Vietnam (H) | 5 | 5 | 0 | 0 | 30 | 0 | +30 | 15 | Final tournament |
| 2 | Malaysia | 5 | 4 | 0 | 1 | 21 | 5 | +16 | 12 | |
| 3 | Hong Kong | 5 | 2 | 1 | 2 | 7 | 4 | +3 | 7 | |
| 4 | Singapore | 5 | 1 | 2 | 2 | 5 | 11 | −6 | 5 | |
| 5 | Macau | 5 | 1 | 1 | 3 | 3 | 12 | −9 | 4 | |
| 6 | Northern Mariana Islands | 5 | 0 | 0 | 5 | 1 | 35 | −34 | 0 | |

Source: AFC
Rules for classification: Qualification tiebreakers
(H) Hosts

| 22 November 2025 Group C | Singapore | 0–6 | Vietnam | Hưng Yên, Vietnam |
| 18:00 UTC+7 | | [https://www.the-afc.com/en/national/afc_u17_asian_cup.html/news/qualifiers-group-c-hong-kong-china-2-0-macau-malaysia-13-0-n-mariana-islands-singapore-0-6-vietnam | Lê Trọng Đại Nhân 4'; Lê Sỹ Bách 25'; Nguyễn Minh Thủy 38'; Chu Ngọc Nguyễn Lực 64', 89'; Trần Mạnh Quân 68' (pen.) | Stadium: PVF Stadium; Referee: Cllifford Daypuyat (Philippines) |

| 24 November 2025 Group C | Vietnam | 14–0 | Northern Mariana Islands | Hưng Yên, Vietnam |
| 18:00 UTC+7 | Trần Mạnh Quân 1', 16'; Nguyễn Văn Đương 21' (pen.), 24'; Chu Ngọc Nguyễn Lực 33'; Nguyễn Minh Thủy 35'; Trần Hoàng Việt 47'; Nguyễn Mạnh Cường 54'; Triệu Đình Vỹ 58'; Đào Quý Vương 74'; Trần Ngọc Sơn 75', 90+2'; Lê Trọng Đại Nhân 79', 81' | Report | | Stadium: PVF Stadium; Referee: Rustam Choriev (Uzbekistan) |

| 26 November 2025 Group C | Vietnam | 2–0 | Hong Kong | Hưng Yên, Vietnam |
| 18:00 UTC+7 | Nguyễn Minh Thủy 11'; Nguyễn Mạnh Cường 72' | Report | | Stadium: PVF Stadium; Referee: Cllifford Daypuyat (Philippines) |

| 28 November 2025 Group C | Macau | 0–4 | Vietnam | Hưng Yên, Vietnam |
| 18:00 UTC+7 | | Report | Triệu Đình Vỹ 9'; Trần Mạnh Quân 22'; Trần Ngọc Sơn 33'; Trương Nguyễn Duy Khang 37' | Stadium: PVF Stadium; Referee: Saleh Al-Ghamdi (Saudi Arabia) |

| 30 November 2025 Group C | Vietnam | 4–0 | Malaysia | Hưng Yên, Vietnam |
| 18:00 UTC+7 | Nguyễn Mạnh Cường 4'; Nguyễn Ngọc Anh Hào 43'; Nguyễn Văn Dương 50'; Lê Sỹ Bách 77' | Report | | Stadium: PVF Stadium; Referee: Clifford Daypuyat (Philippines) |

===== 2026 ASEAN U-17 Boys' Championship =====
====== 2026 ASEAN U-17 Boys' Championship Group A ======
| Pos | Team | Pld | W | D | L | GF | GA | GD | Pts | Qualification |
|---|---|---|---|---|---|---|---|---|---|---|
| 1 | Vietnam | 3 | 2 | 1 | 0 | 14 | 0 | +14 | 7 | Knockout stage |
| 2 | Malaysia | 3 | 2 | 0 | 1 | 3 | 4 | −1 | 6 | Knockout stage |
| 3 | Indonesia (H) | 3 | 1 | 1 | 1 | 4 | 1 | +3 | 4 | |
| 4 | Timor-Leste | 3 | 0 | 0 | 3 | 0 | 16 | −16 | 0 | |

Source: AFF
Rules for classification: Group stage tiebreakers
(H) Hosts

====== 2026 ASEAN U-17 Boys' Championship fixtures and results ======
| 13 April 2026 Group A | Vietnam | 4–0 | Malaysia | Gresik, Indonesia |
| 15:30 UTC+7 | Lê Sỹ Bách 11', 27'; Nguyễn Văn Dương 38'; Nguyễn Mạnh Cường 56' | Report | | Stadium: Gelora Joko Samudro Stadium; Referee: Choi Cheol-jun (South Korea) |

| 16 April 2026 Group A | Timor-Leste | 0–10 | Vietnam | Gresik, Indonesia |
| 15:30 UTC+7 | | Report | Chu Ngọc Nguyễn Lực 6', 32', 85'; Lê Trọng Đại Nhân 20'; Trần Ngọc Sơn 24'; Trần Trí Dũng 61'; Nguyễn Văn Dương 67', 72', 81'; Trương Nguyễn Duy Khang 70' | Stadium: Gelora Joko Samudro Stadium; Referee: Iv Tina (Cambodia) |

| 19 April 2026 Group A | Indonesia | 0–0 | Vietnam | Sidoarjo, Indonesia |
| 19:30 UTC+7 | | Report | | Stadium: Gelora Delta Stadium; Referee: Choi Cheol-jun (South Korea) |

| 22 April 2026 Semi-finals | Vietnam | 2–1 | Australia | Sidoarjo, Indonesia |
| 19:30 UTC+7 | Nguyễn Mạnh Cường 45+5'; Chu Ngọc Nguyễn Lực 61' | Report | Becvinocski 9' | Stadium: Gelora Delta Stadium; Referee: Yusuke Ohashi (Japan) |

| 24 April 2026 Final | Malaysia | 0–3 | Vietnam | Sidoarjo, Indonesia |
| 19:30 UTC+7 | | | Đào Quý Vương 11'; Nguyễn Văn Dương 45+4', 54' | Stadium: Gelora Delta Stadium; Referee: Naufal Adya Fairuski (Indonesia) |

===== Friendly matches =====
| 3 November 2025 Friendly | Vietnam | 5–0 | Cambodia | Hưng Yên |
| --:-- UTC+7 | Chu Ngọc Nguyễn Lực; Nguyễn Trọng Đại Nhân; Nguyễn Minh Thủy; Nguyễn Văn Dương; Trần Mạnh Quân | Report | | Stadium: PVF Stadium |

| 5 November 2025 Friendly | Vietnam | 5–0 | Cambodia | Hanoi |
| --:-- UTC+7 | Nguyễn Văn Dương; Vũ Long Nhật; Chu Ngọc Nguyễn Lực | Report | | Stadium: Vietnam Youth Football Training Center |

=== Women ===
==== U-20/U-19/U-18 ====
===== 2026 AFC U-20 Women's Asian Cup =====
====== 2026 AFC U-20 Women's Asian Cup Group A ======
| Pos | Team | Pld | W | D | L | GF | GA | GD | Pts | Qualification |
|---|---|---|---|---|---|---|---|---|---|---|
| 1 | China | 3 | 3 | 0 | 0 | 6 | 0 | +6 | 9 | Knockout stage |
| 2 | Thailand (H) | 3 | 2 | 0 | 1 | 7 | 4 | +3 | 6 | Knockout stage |
| 3 | Vietnam | 3 | 1 | 0 | 2 | 2 | 7 | −5 | 3 | Knockout stage |
| 4 | Bangladesh | 3 | 0 | 0 | 3 | 2 | 6 | −4 | 0 | |

Source: AFC
Rules for classification: Qualification tiebreakers
(H) Hosts

====== 2026 AFC U-20 Women's Asian Cup fixtures and results ======
| 1 April 2026 Group A | China | 3–0 | Vietnam | Nonthaburi, Thailand |
| 16:00 UTC+7 | Zheng Lu 39', 44'; Zeng Yujia 77' | Report | | Stadium: Nonthaburi Province Stadium; Attendance: 51; Referee: Alesar Baddour (Syria) |

| 4 April 2026 Group A | Vietnam | 1–4 | Thailand | Pathum Thani, Thailand |
| 20:00 UTC+7 | Nguyễn Thị Thùy Linh 51' | Report | Kurisara 11', 41'; Rinyaphat 21', 90+3' | Stadium: Thammasat Stadium; Attendance: 418; Referee: Pak Un-jong (North Korea) |

| 7 April 2026 Group A | Vietnam | 1–0 | Bangladesh | Nonthaburi, Thailand |
| 20:00 UTC+7 | Nguyễn Thị Thùy Linh 49' | Report | | Stadium: Nonthaburi Province Stadium; Attendance: 36; Referee: Yang Shu-ting (Chinese Taipei) |

| 11 April 2026 Quarter-finals | Japan | 4–0 | Vietnam | Pathum Thani, Thailand |
| 20:00 UTC+7 | Itamura 18', 61'; Tago 45+1'; Fukushima 45+2' | Report | | Stadium: Pathum Thani Stadium; Attendance: 86; Referee: Alissar Baddour (Syria) |

===== 2026 AFC U-20 Women's Asian Cup qualification =====
====== Group B ======
| Pos | Team | Pld | W | D | L | GF | GA | GD | Pts | Qualification |
|---|---|---|---|---|---|---|---|---|---|---|
| 1 | Vietnam (H) | 3 | 3 | 0 | 0 | 14 | 0 | +14 | 9 | Final tournament |
| 2 | Hong Kong | 3 | 2 | 0 | 1 | 5 | 8 | −3 | 6 | |
| 3 | Kyrgyzstan | 3 | 1 | 0 | 2 | 2 | 5 | −3 | 3 | |
| 4 | Singapore | 3 | 0 | 0 | 3 | 1 | 9 | −8 | 0 | |

Source: AFC
Rules for classification: Qualification tiebreakers
(H) Hosts

| 6 August 2025 Group B | Vietnam | 5–0 | Singapore | Hanoi |
| 19:00 UTC+7 | Nguyễn Vĩnh Thục Nghi 15'; Y Za Lương 48'; Nguyễn Ngô Thảo Nguyên 50'; Nguyễn Thị Thương 86'; Cà Thị Phượng 88' | Report | | Stadium: Vietnam Youth Football Training Center; Referee: Yu Hong (China) |

| 8 August 2025 Group B | Hong Kong | 0–6 | Vietnam | Hanoi |
| 19:00 UTC+7 | | Report | Trương Thị Hoài Trinh 16', 35'; Ngân Thị Thanh Hiếu 45+2'; Nguyễn Thị Thùy Linh 65'; Lưu Hoàng Vân 67'; Đỗ Thị Thúy Nga 90' | Stadium: Vietnam Youth Football Training Center; Referee: Kim Yu-jeong (South Korea) |

| 10 August 2025 Group B | Vietnam | 3–0 | Kyrgyzstan | Hanoi |
| 19:00 UTC+7 | Lưu Hoàng Vân 3'; Đào Khánh Vy 28'; Y Za Lương 74' | Report | | Stadium: Vietnam Youth Football Training Center; Referee: Kim Yu-jeong (South Korea) |

===== Friendly matches =====
| 24 March 2026 Friendly | Vietnam | 4–0 | Uzbekistan | Ho Chi Minh City |
| --:-- UTC+7 | Lê Thị Trang 23', 33'; Đào Khánh Vy 44'; Lê Hồng Yêu 60' | Report |

| 27 March 2026 Friendly | Vietnam | 1–1 | Uzbekistan | Ho Chi Minh City |
| --:-- UTC+7 | Đỗ Thị Thúy Nga 40' | Report | ? |

==== U-17/U-16 ====
===== 2025 ASEAN U-16 Women's Championship =====
====== 2025 ASEAN U-16 Women's Championship Group B ======
| Pos | Team | Pld | W | D | L | GF | GA | GD | Pts | Qualification |
|---|---|---|---|---|---|---|---|---|---|---|
| 1 | Vietnam | 2 | 2 | 0 | 0 | 7 | 0 | +7 | 6 | Advance to knockout stage |
| 2 | Myanmar | 2 | 1 | 0 | 1 | 4 | 3 | +1 | 3 | |
| 3 | Cambodia | 2 | 0 | 0 | 2 | 1 | 9 | −8 | 0 | |

Rules for classification: Qualification tiebreakers

====== 2025 ASEAN U-16 Women's Championship fixtures and results ======
| 21 August 2025 Group B | Cambodia | 0–5 | Vietnam | Surakarta, Indonesia |
| 19:30 UTC+7 | | | Nguyễn Thị Linh Chi 6'; Nguyễn Thị Minh Ánh 37', 80', 89'; Phan Thị Thu Phương 75' | Stadium: Sriwedari Stadium; Referee: Wang Chieh (Chinese Taipei) |

| 25 August 2025 Group B | Vietnam | 2–0 | Myanmar | Surakarta, Indonesia |
| 19:30 UTC+7 | Lê Thị Hồng Thái 69' (pen.); Nguyễn Thị Ngọc Ánh 85' (pen.) | | | Stadium: Manahan Stadium; Referee: Wang Chieh (Chinese Taipei) |

| 27 August 2025 Semi-finals | Vietnam | 1–3 | Thailand | Surakarta, Indonesia |
| 15:30 UTC+7 | Suracha 16' (o.g.) | | Kawinthida 6'; Monthida 42'; Charlotte 45+2' | Stadium: Manahan Stadium; Referee: Cha Min-ji (South Korea) |

| 29 August 2025 Third place play-off | Vietnam | 1–1 (7–6 p) | Indonesia | Surakarta, Indonesia |
| 15:30 UTC+7 | Nazwa 2' (o.g.) | | Naffeza 15' | Stadium: Manahan Stadium; Referee: Pansa Chaisanit (Thailand) |
| | Penalties |
| | Nguyễn Thị Ngọc Ánh (penalty scored); Trần Thị An (penalty scored); Nguyễn Thị Linh Chi (penalty scored); Hà Yến Nhi (penalty scored); Lê Thị Hồng Thái (penalty scored); Nguyễn Dương Phương Nghi (penalty scored); Nguyễn Thị Minh Ánh (penalty scored) | | (penalty scored) Naffeza; (penalty scored) Shifana; (penalty scored) Indira; (penalty scored) Febri; (penalty scored) Jazlyn; (penalty scored) Syafia; (penalty missed) Vivi |

===== 2026 AFC U-17 Women's Asian Cup =====
====== 2026 AFC U-17 Women's Asian Cup Group A ======
| Pos | Team | Pld | W | D | L | GF | GA | GD | Pts | Qualification |
|---|---|---|---|---|---|---|---|---|---|---|
| 1 | China (H) | 3 | 3 | 0 | 0 | 15 | 0 | +15 | 9 | Knockout stage |
| 2 | Vietnam | 3 | 1 | 1 | 1 | 4 | 6 | −2 | 4 | Knockout stage |
| 3 | Thailand | 3 | 1 | 1 | 1 | 3 | 8 | −5 | 4 | Knockout stage |
| 4 | Myanmar | 3 | 0 | 0 | 3 | 1 | 9 | −8 | 0 | |

Source: AFC
Rules for classification: Qualification tiebreakers
(H) Hosts

====== 2026 AFC U-17 Women's Asian Cup fixtures and results ======
| 1 May 2026 Group A | Thailand | 2–2 | Vietnam | Suzhou, China |
| 15:30 UTC+8 (14:30 UTC+7) | Miricah 27'; Wangchin 37' | Report | Phan Thị Thu Phương 35'; Nguyễn Thị Thanh Lam 90+1' | Stadium: Suzhou Taihu Football Sports Centre Pitch 1 Attendance: 75; Referee: Wang Chieh (Chinese Taipei) |

| 4 May 2026 Group A | Vietnam | 0–3 | China | Suzhou, China |
| 19:30 UTC+8 (18:30 UTC+7) | | Report | Ju Zhitong 16', 32'; Cheng Wandi 49' | Stadium: Suzhou Taihu Football Sports Centre Pitch 1 Attendance: 344; Referee: Park Se-jin (South Korea) |

| 7 May 2026 Group A | Vietnam | 2–1 | Myanmar | Suzhou, China |
| 19:30 UTC+8 (18:30 UTC+7) | Nguyễn Thị Linh Chi 18'; Nguyen Thi Ngoc Ánh 55' | Report | Thaw Dar Hnin 66' | Stadium: Suzhou Taihu Football Sports Centre Pitch 1 Attendance: 57; Referee: Khuloud Al-Zaabi (United Arab Emirates) |

| 11 May 2026 Quarter-finals | Vietnam | 0–2 | Australia | Suzhou, China |
| 15:00 UTC+8 (14:00 UTC+7) | | Report | Karaberis 28'; Hussein 31' | Stadium: Suzhou Sports Centre Stadium; Attendance: 93; Referee: Jon Sol-mi (North Korea) |

===== 2026 AFC U-17 Women's Asian Cup qualification =====
====== Group D ======
| Pos | Team | Pld | W | D | L | GF | GA | GD | Pts | Qualification |
|---|---|---|---|---|---|---|---|---|---|---|
| 1 | Vietnam (H) | 2 | 2 | 0 | 0 | 6 | 0 | +6 | 6 | Final tournament |
| 2 | Hong Kong | 2 | 1 | 0 | 1 | 7 | 2 | +5 | 3 | |
| 3 | Guam | 2 | 0 | 0 | 2 | 1 | 12 | −11 | 0 | |

Source: AFC
Rules for classification: Qualification tiebreakers
(H) Hosts

| 13 October 2025 Group D | Guam | 0–5 | Vietnam | Ho Chi Minh City, Vietnam |
| 16:00 UTC+7 | | Report | Nguyễn Thị Minh Ánh 21', 41', 73'; Hà Yến Nhi 54'; Lê Thị Hồng Thái 87' | Stadium: Gò Đậu Stadium; Referee: Rawdha Almansoori (United Arab Emirates) |

| 17 October 2025 Group D | Vietnam | 1–0 | Hong Kong | Ho Chi Minh City, Vietnam |
| 16:00 UTC+7 | Ngô Hải Yến 66' | Report | | Stadium: Gò Đậu Stadium; Referee: Esraa Almbaiden (Jordan) |

== League season ==
=== Men ===
==== V.League 1 ====
===== V.League 1 standings =====
| Pos | Team | Pld | W | D | L | GF | GA | GD | Pts | Qualification or relegation |
|---|---|---|---|---|---|---|---|---|---|---|
| 1 | Cong An Hanoi (C) | 26 | 20 | 4 | 2 | 58 | 22 | +36 | 64 | Qualification for the AFC Champions League Elite preliminary stage and ASEAN Club Championship group stage |
| 2 | The Cong-Viettel | 26 | 15 | 9 | 2 | 39 | 21 | +18 | 54 | Qualification for the AFC Champions League Two group stage |
| 3 | Ninh Binh | 26 | 15 | 6 | 5 | 53 | 31 | +22 | 51 | |
| 4 | Hanoi FC | 26 | 14 | 4 | 8 | 48 | 30 | +18 | 46 | |
| 5 | Cong An Ho Chi Minh City | 26 | 10 | 6 | 10 | 28 | 36 | −8 | 36 | Qualification for the ASEAN Club Championship group stage (Note: Cong An Ho Chi Minh City, the winners of the 2025–26 Vietnamese Cup, qualified for the ASEAN Club Championship group stage.) |
| 6 | Thep Xanh Nam Dinh | 26 | 9 | 8 | 9 | 33 | 32 | +1 | 35 | |
| 7 | Haiphong | 26 | 9 | 5 | 12 | 37 | 36 | +1 | 32 | |
| 8 | Hong Linh Ha Tinh | 26 | 7 | 8 | 11 | 15 | 29 | −14 | 29 | |
| 9 | Song Lam Nghe An | 26 | 7 | 6 | 13 | 27 | 40 | −13 | 27 | |
| 10 | Hoang Anh Gia Lai | 26 | 6 | 8 | 12 | 24 | 37 | −13 | 26 | |
| 11 | Dong A Thanh Hoa | 26 | 5 | 10 | 11 | 26 | 38 | −12 | 25 | |
| 12 | SHB Da Nang | 26 | 5 | 9 | 12 | 33 | 39 | −6 | 24 (Note: Head-to-head points: SHB Da Nang 10, PVF-CAND 5, Becamex Ho Chi Minh City 1.) | |
| 13 | PVF-CAND (R) | 26 | 5 | 9 | 12 | 26 | 44 | −18 | 24 | Qualification for the relegation play-offs |
| 14 | Becamex Ho Chi Minh City (R) | 26 | 6 | 6 | 14 | 31 | 43 | −12 | 24 | Relegation to V.League 2 |

Source: VPF
Rules for classification: 1) Points; 2) Head-to-head points; 3) Head-to-head goal difference; 4) Head-to-head goals scored; 5) Goal difference; 6) Goals scored; 7) Away goals scored; 8) Disciplinary points.
(C) Champions; (R) Relegated

==== V.League 2 ====
===== V.League 2 standings =====
| Pos | Team | Pld | W | D | L | GF | GA | GD | Pts | Promotion, qualification or relegation |
|---|---|---|---|---|---|---|---|---|---|---|
| 1 | Truong Tuoi Dong Nai (C, P) | 22 | 15 | 5 | 2 | 47 | 14 | +33 | 50 | Promotion to V.League 1 |
| 2 | Bac Ninh (O, P) | 22 | 13 | 6 | 3 | 41 | 23 | +18 | 45 | Qualification for promotion play-offs |
| 3 | Ho Chi Minh City FC | 22 | 11 | 5 | 6 | 33 | 22 | +11 | 38 | |
| 4 | Quy Nhon United | 22 | 10 | 5 | 7 | 38 | 31 | +7 | 35 | |
| 5 | Xuan Thien Phu Tho | 22 | 9 | 6 | 7 | 34 | 32 | +2 | 33 | |
| 6 | PVF-CAND B (Note: PVF-CAND B cannot promote to the V.League 1 as the club cannot compete in the same division as their A team.) | 22 | 8 | 8 | 6 | 34 | 26 | +8 | 32 | |
| 7 | Van Hien University | 22 | 7 | 7 | 8 | 21 | 24 | −3 | 28 | |
| 8 | Khatoco Khanh Hoa | 22 | 7 | 6 | 9 | 21 | 23 | −2 | 27 | |
| 9 | Quang Ninh | 22 | 6 | 8 | 8 | 23 | 26 | −3 | 26 | |
| 10 | Dong Thap | 22 | 5 | 9 | 8 | 16 | 21 | −5 | 24 | |
| 11 | Long An | 22 | 3 | 5 | 14 | 11 | 30 | −19 | 14 | |
| 12 | Ho Chi Minh City Youth (R) | 22 | 1 | 4 | 17 | 15 | 62 | −47 | 7 | Relegation to Vietnamese Second Division |

Source: VPF
Rules for classification: 1) Points; 2) Head-to-head points; 3) Head-to-head goal difference; 4) Head-to-head goals scored; 5) Goal difference; 6) Goals scored; 7) Away goals scored; 8) Fair-play points.
(C) Champions; (O) Play-off winners; (P) Promoted; (R) Relegated

==== Vietnamese Football League Second Division ====
===== Second Division standings =====
====== Group A ======
| Pos | Team | Pld | W | D | L | GF | GA | GD | Pts | Qualification |
|---|---|---|---|---|---|---|---|---|---|---|
| 1 | Hanoi FC B | 12 | 6 | 6 | 0 | 19 | 7 | +12 | 24 | Advance to final round |
| 2 | Hue | 12 | 6 | 4 | 2 | 19 | 8 | +11 | 22 | Advance to final round |
| 3 | Ha Tinh | 12 | 5 | 2 | 5 | 11 | 17 | −6 | 17 | |
| 4 | PVF | 12 | 4 | 5 | 3 | 13 | 10 | +3 | 17 | |
| 5 | Cong An Hanoi B | 12 | 2 | 5 | 5 | 7 | 13 | −6 | 11 | |
| 6 | SHB Da Nang B | 12 | 2 | 5 | 5 | 8 | 15 | −7 | 11 | |
| 7 | Phu Dong (R) | 12 | 1 | 5 | 6 | 7 | 14 | −7 | 8 | Relegation to Third Division |

Source: VFF
Rules for classification: 1) Points; 2) Head-to-head record; 3) Goal difference; 4) Number of goals scored; 5) Disciplinary points; 6) Drawing of lots.
(R) Relegated

====== Group B ======
| Pos | Team | Pld | W | D | L | GF | GA | GD | Pts | Qualification |
|---|---|---|---|---|---|---|---|---|---|---|
| 1 | Lam Dong | 12 | 7 | 4 | 1 | 17 | 6 | +11 | 25 | Advance to final round |
| 2 | Truong Giang-Gia Dinh | 12 | 6 | 4 | 2 | 13 | 7 | +6 | 22 (Note: Head-to-head points: Truong Giang-Gia Dinh: 4; Quang Ngai: 1) | Advance to final round |
| 3 | Quang Ngai | 12 | 6 | 4 | 2 | 18 | 11 | +7 | 22 | |
| 4 | Tay Ninh | 12 | 5 | 2 | 5 | 17 | 14 | +3 | 17 | |
| 5 | Dak Lak | 12 | 3 | 3 | 6 | 10 | 13 | −3 | 12 | |
| 6 | Vinh Long | 12 | 3 | 2 | 7 | 9 | 16 | −7 | 11 | |
| 7 | Mekong Can Tho (R) | 12 | 1 | 3 | 8 | 5 | 22 | −17 | 6 | Relegation to Third Division |

Source: VFF
Rules for classification: 1) Points; 2) Head-to-head record; 3) Goal difference; 4) Number of goals scored; 5) Disciplinary points; 6) Drawing of lots.
(R) Relegated

====== Final round ======
Round 1
13 June
Hanoi FC B | 3
Truong Giang-Gia Dinh | 1
13 June
Lam Dong | 0
Hue | 3

Round 2
16 June
Truong Giang-Gia Dinh | 0 (3)
Lam Dong | 0 (4)

==== Vietnamese Football League Third Division ====
===== Third Division standings =====
====== Group A ======
| Pos | Team | Pld | W | D | L | GF | GA | GD | Pts | Promotion |
|---|---|---|---|---|---|---|---|---|---|---|
| 1 | Tây Mỗ (P) | 10 | 7 | 1 | 2 | 13 | 5 | +8 | 22 | Promotion to Second Division |
| 2 | Hà Nội B (P) | 10 | 6 | 2 | 2 | 19 | 12 | +7 | 20 | Promotion to Second Division |
| 3 | Vạn Xuân Đan Phượng | 10 | 6 | 2 | 2 | 12 | 8 | +4 | 20 | |
| 4 | Hà Nội Bulls | 10 | 4 | 2 | 4 | 14 | 11 | +3 | 14 | |
| 5 | Bình Định | 10 | 1 | 2 | 7 | 7 | 18 | −11 | 5 | |
| 6 | Nam Định B | 10 | 0 | 3 | 7 | 3 | 14 | −11 | 3 | |

Source: VFF
Rules for classification: 1) Points; 2) Head-to-head record; 3) Goal difference; 4) Number of goals scored; 5) Number of away goals scored; 6) Disciplinary points; 7) Drawing of lots.
(Rules 3–5 only apply after home and away matches have been played between the tied teams.)
(P) Promoted

====== Group B ======
| Pos | Team | Pld | W | D | L | GF | GA | GD | Pts | Promotion |
|---|---|---|---|---|---|---|---|---|---|---|
| 1 | Đồng Tháp (P) | 10 | 7 | 3 | 0 | 25 | 3 | +22 | 24 | Promotion to Second Division |
| 2 | An Giang (P) | 10 | 6 | 2 | 2 | 12 | 6 | +6 | 20 | Promotion to Second Division |
| 3 | STP FOOD Hồ Chí Minh City | 10 | 6 | 0 | 4 | 14 | 10 | +4 | 18 | |
| 4 | Đồng Nai | 10 | 6 | 0 | 4 | 12 | 11 | +1 | 18 | |
| 5 | Khánh Hòa B | 10 | 1 | 2 | 7 | 12 | 20 | −8 | 5 | |
| 6 | Hồ Chí Minh United | 10 | 0 | 1 | 9 | 6 | 31 | −25 | 1 | |

Source: VFF
Rules for classification: 1) Points; 2) Head-to-head record; 3) Goal difference; 4) Number of goals scored; 5) Number of away goals scored; 6) Disciplinary points; 7) Drawing of lots.
(Rules 3–5 only apply after home and away matches have been played between the tied teams.)
(P) Promoted

=== Women ===
==== V-Women's League ====
===== V-Women's League standings =====
| Pos | Team | Pld | W | D | L | GF | GA | GD | Pts | Qualification |
|---|---|---|---|---|---|---|---|---|---|---|
| 1 | Ho Chi Minh City I (C) | 12 | 9 | 1 | 2 | 32 | 7 | +25 | 28 | Qualification for the Champions League group stage |
| 2 | Thai Nguyen T&T | 12 | 8 | 3 | 1 | 29 | 12 | +17 | 27 | |
| 3 | Hanoi I | 12 | 7 | 3 | 2 | 22 | 12 | +10 | 24 | |
| 4 | Phong Phu Ha Nam | 12 | 6 | 3 | 3 | 33 | 13 | +20 | 21 | |
| 5 | Than KSVN | 12 | 4 | 1 | 7 | 24 | 19 | +5 | 13 | |
| 6 | Ho Chi Minh City II | 12 | 0 | 3 | 9 | 9 | 40 | −31 | 3 | |
| 7 | Hanoi II | 12 | 0 | 2 | 10 | 4 | 50 | −46 | 2 | |

Source: VFF
Rules for classification: 1) Points; 2) Head-to-head points; 3) Head-to-head goal difference; 4) Head-to-head goals scored; 5) Goal difference; 6) Goals scored; 7) Disciplinary points.
(C) Champions

== Cup competitions ==
=== Men ===
==== Vietnamese Cup ====
14 June 2026
18:00 UTC+7

| Ninh Binh | 1–2 | Cong An Ho Chi Minh City |
|---|---|---|
| Geovane 74' (pen.) | Report | Utzig 16'; Williams 34' |

Ninh Bình Stadium, Ninh Bình
Attendance: 12,000
Referee: Muhammad Taqi (Singapore)

==== Vietnamese Super Cup ====
9 August 2025
18:00 UTC+7

| Thep Xanh Nam Dinh | 2–3 | Cong An Hanoi |
|---|---|---|
| Hudlin 54', 90+15' (pen.) | Report | Alan 38'; Artur 90+3'; Nguyễn Đình Bắc 90+8' |

Thiên Trường Stadium, Ninh Bình
Attendance: 15,000
Referee: Mai Xuân Hùng

=== Women ===
==== Vietnamese Women's National Cup ====
27 May 2026
19:00 UTC+7

| Hanoi I | 0–0 | Ho Chi Minh City |
|---|---|---|
| | Report |
Penalties
| Hoàng Thị Loan (penalty missed); Nguyễn Thị Hằng (penalty missed); Ngân Thị Vạn Sự (penalty missed) | 0–3 | Ngô Thị Hồng Nhung (penalty scored); Trần Thị Thu Xuân (penalty missed); Trần Thị Thùy Trang (penalty scored); Huỳnh Như (penalty scored) |

Thái Nguyên Stadium, Thái Nguyên
Referee: Bùi Thị Thu Trang

== Vietnamese clubs in Asia ==
=== Men ===
==== Group stage ====
===== Group E =====
| Pos | Team | Pld | W | D | L | GF | GA | GD | Pts | Qualification | MAC | HNP | TPF | BJG |
|---|---|---|---|---|---|---|---|---|---|---|---|---|---|---|
| 1 | (Australia) Macarthur FC | 6 | 4 | 1 | 1 | 11 | 6 | +5 | 13 | Advance to round of 16 | — | 2–1 | 2–1 | 3–0 |
| 2 | (Vietnam) Công An Hà Nội | 6 | 2 | 2 | 2 | 9 | 7 | +2 | 8 | Advance to round of 16 | 1–1 | — | 3–0 | 2–1 |
| 3 | (Hong Kong) Tai Po | 6 | 2 | 1 | 3 | 7 | 12 | −5 | 7 | | 2–1 | 1–0 | — | 3–3 |
| 4 | (China) Beijing Guoan | 6 | 1 | 2 | 3 | 10 | 12 | −2 | 5 | | 1–2 | 2–2 | 3–0 | — |

Source: ACL2

===== Group F =====
| Pos | Team | Pld | W | D | L | GF | GA | GD | Pts | Qualification | GOS | RPM | TND | EAS |
|---|---|---|---|---|---|---|---|---|---|---|---|---|---|---|
| 1 | (Japan) Gamba Osaka | 6 | 6 | 0 | 0 | 16 | 2 | +14 | 18 | Advance to round of 16 | — | 2–0 | 3–1 | 3–1 |
| 2 | (Thailand) Ratchaburi | 6 | 3 | 0 | 3 | 15 | 8 | +7 | 9 | Advance to round of 16 | 0–2 | — | 2–0 | 5–1 |
| 3 | (Vietnam) Nam Định | 6 | 3 | 0 | 3 | 14 | 7 | +7 | 9 | | 0–1 | 3–1 | — | 9–0 |
| 4 | (Hong Kong) Eastern | 6 | 0 | 0 | 6 | 2 | 30 | −28 | 0 | | 0–5 | 0–7 | 0–1 | — |

Source: ACL2

==== Knockout stage ====
===== Round of 16 =====
| Team 1 | Agg. | Team 2 | 1st leg | 2nd leg |
|---|---|---|---|---|
| Công An Hà Nội (Vietnam) | 1–6 | (Singapore) Tampines Rovers | 0–3 (Note: Tampines Rovers were awarded a 0–3 victory by forfeit, after Công An Hà Nội fielded two ineligible players, Stefan Mauk and Rogério Alves. The score on the field was originally a 4–0 win by Công An Hà Nội.) | 1–3 |

=== Women ===
==== AFC Women's Champions League ====
===== Group stage =====
====== Group A ======
| Pos | Team | Pld | W | D | L | GF | GA | GD | Pts | Qualification |
|---|---|---|---|---|---|---|---|---|---|---|
| 1 | (Australia) Melbourne City | 3 | 3 | 0 | 0 | 15 | 0 | +15 | 9 | Advance to knockout stage |
| 2 | (Vietnam) Hồ Chí Minh City (H) | 3 | 2 | 0 | 1 | 3 | 3 | 0 | 6 | Advance to knockout stage |
| 3 | (Philippines) Stallion Laguna | 3 | 1 | 0 | 2 | 5 | 8 | −3 | 3 | Advance to knockout stage |
| 4 | (Singapore) Lion City Sailors | 3 | 0 | 0 | 3 | 0 | 12 | −12 | 0 | |

Source: AFC
Rules for classification: Tiebreakers
(H) Hosts

===== Knockout stage =====
====== Quarter-finals ======
| Team 1 | Score | Team 2 |
|---|---|---|
| Naegohyang (North Korea) | 3–0 | (Vietnam) Hồ Chí Minh City |

== Vietnamese clubs in Southeast Asia ==
=== ASEAN Club Championship ===
==== Group stage ====
===== Group A =====
| Pos | Team | Pld | W | D | L | GF | GA | GD | Pts | Qualification | BRU | SEL | BGP | CAH | BGT | DHC |
|---|---|---|---|---|---|---|---|---|---|---|---|---|---|---|---|---|
| 1 | (Thailand) Buriram United | 5 | 2 | 3 | 0 | 14 | 5 | +9 | 9 | Advance to knockout stage | — | 1–1 | — | 1–1 | — | 6–0 |
| 2 | (Malaysia) Selangor | 5 | 2 | 3 | 0 | 9 | 5 | +4 | 9 | Advance to knockout stage | — | — | 1–1 | 2–0 | 4–2 | — |
| 3 | (Thailand) BG Pathum United | 5 | 2 | 2 | 1 | 9 | 7 | +2 | 8 | | 2–2 | — | — | 2–1 | — | 2–0 |
| 4 | (Vietnam) Công An Hà Nội | 5 | 2 | 1 | 2 | 9 | 6 | +3 | 7 | | — | — | — | — | 6–1 | 1–0 |
| 5 | (Singapore) Tampines Rovers | 5 | 2 | 0 | 3 | 10 | 17 | −7 | 6 | | 1–4 | — | 3–2 | — | — | — |
| 6 | (Philippines) Dynamic Herb Cebu | 5 | 0 | 1 | 4 | 2 | 13 | −11 | 1 | | — | 1–1 | — | — | 1–3 | — |

Source: ASEAN United FC

===== Group B =====
| Pos | Team | Pld | W | D | L | GF | GA | GD | Pts | Qualification | NDI | JDT | PKR | BKU | LCS | SUN |
|---|---|---|---|---|---|---|---|---|---|---|---|---|---|---|---|---|
| 1 | (Vietnam) Nam Định | 5 | 4 | 1 | 0 | 13 | 3 | +10 | 13 | Advance to knockout stage | — | 1–1 | 2–1 | — | 3–0 | — |
| 2 | (Malaysia) Johor Darul Ta'zim | 5 | 3 | 2 | 0 | 13 | 4 | +9 | 11 | Advance to knockout stage | — | — | — | 4–0 | 3–1 | 3–0 |
| 3 | (Cambodia) Preah Khan Reach Svay Rieng | 5 | 2 | 2 | 1 | 9 | 5 | +4 | 8 | | — | 2–2 | — | 1–1 | — | — |
| 4 | (Thailand) Bangkok United | 5 | 1 | 2 | 2 | 6 | 12 | −6 | 5 | | 1–4 | — | — | — | 2–2 | 2–1 |
| 5 | (Singapore) Lion City Sailors | 5 | 1 | 1 | 3 | 6 | 12 | −6 | 4 | | — | — | 0–2 | — | — | 3–2 |
| 6 | (Myanmar) Shan United | 5 | 0 | 0 | 5 | 3 | 14 | −11 | 0 | | 0–3 | — | 0–3 | — | — | — |

Source: ASEAN United FC

==== Knockout stage ====
===== Semi-finals =====
| Team 1 | Agg. | Team 2 | 1st leg | 2nd leg |
|---|---|---|---|---|
| Selangor (Malaysia) | 4–1 | (Vietnam) Nam Định | 2–1 | 2–0 |

== Retirements ==
- 22 October 2025, Nguyễn Thị Tuyết Dung, 31, former Vietnam, Phong Phú Hà Nam midfielder.

== Deaths ==
- 12 November 2025: Hồ Văn Lợi, 55, Cảng Sài Gòn midfielder.
- 4 March 2026: Nguyễn Minh Nghĩa, 49, Đồng Tháp, Hoàng Anh Gia Lai and Cần Thơ forward.
- 11 August 2026: Phan Thanh Hùng, 66, Quảng Nam–Đà Nẵng forward.
