= 2025 Vietnamese Football League Third Division =

20th season of Vietnamese Third Division

Vietnamese Third Division
- Season: 2025
- Dates: 26 October – 23 November
- Champions: Phù Đổng (Group A); Hà Tĩnh (Group B); Trường Giang-Gia Định (Group C)
- Promoted: Phù Đổng; Công An Hà Nội B Hà Tĩnh; Trường Giang-Gia Định
- Matches: 80
- Goals: 265 (3.31 per match)
- Biggest home win: Đồng Tháp B 7–0 Đồng Nai University of Technology (14 November 2025)
- Biggest away win: Luxury Hạ Long 0–6 Công An Hà Nội B (1 November 2025)
- Highest scoring: Đồng Tháp B 5–5 Đồng Nai FC (23 November 2025)
- Longest winning run: Trường Giang-Gia Định (6)
- Longest unbeaten run: Trường Giang-Gia Định (10)
- Longest winless run: Đắk Lắk B (7)
- Longest losing run: Đắk Lắk B (7)

The 2025 Vietnamese Football League Third Division (Vietnamese: Giải bóng đá hạng Ba quốc gia 2025) was the 20th season of the Vietnamese Third Division. It started on 26 October and concluded on 23 November 2025.

The fixtures was drawn on 9 October 2025 in 10:00 local time (UTC+7) and later released on 13 October 2025.

== Teams ==
=== Team changes ===
Relegated from 2024 Second Division	Promoted to 2025 Second Division	New entries	Not engaged
~~Tây Nguyên Gia Lai~~; Tiền Giang	Hoài Đức; Gia Định; PVF-CAND B Quảng Ninh; Tây Ninh	Đồng Nai University of Technology; Hà Nội Bulls; Hà Tĩnh; Hoài Đức B Khánh Hòa B Luxury Hạ Long; Phù Đổng; STP FOOD Hồ Chí Minh City; Trường Giang-Gia Định	Cần Thơ; Hoàng Anh Gia Lai B Tây Nguyên Gia Lai; Thép Xanh Nam Định B Zantino Vĩnh Phúc

- Tiền Giang merged with Đồng Tháp's reserves team and was renamed as Đồng Tháp B.
- Phú Yên merged with Đắk Lắk's reserves team and was renamed as Đắk Lắk B.
- Hồ Chí Minh City Youth changed their name to Thống Nhất TPG Youth.
- Đồng Nai withdrew from the V.League 2, merged with their reserves team and started over from the Third Division.

=== Stadiums and locations ===
Locations of the 2025 Vietnamese Third Division centralized venues

On this season, the league plays at a centralized venue on each group:

Group	Location	Stadium	Capacity
A	Hanoi	Hoài Đức Stadium	3,500
B	Đắk Lắk	Buôn Ma Thuột Stadium	20,000
C	Ho Chi Minh City	Tân Hiệp Stadium	1,000
C	Ho Chi Minh City	Thới Tứ - Hóc Môn Stadium	400
C	Ho Chi Minh City	Minh Khoa Sport Stadium (Note: From matchday 5 to matchday 8, some Group C matches were contemporarily moved Minh Khoa Sport Stadium due to bad pitch conditions in other stadiums caused by heavy rain.)	100

=== Personnel and kits ===
Team	Location	Manager	Kit manufacturer	Shirt sponsor
An Giang	An Giang	(Vietnam) Nguyễn Hồ Nhật Tiến	(Vietnam) Egan	
Becamex Hồ Chí Minh City B	Ho Chi Minh City	(Vietnam) Trịnh Văn Hậu	(Vietnam) Kamito	
Thống Nhất TPG Youth	Ho Chi Minh City	(France) Thierry Castan (Vietnam) Trương Huỳnh Phú	(Vietnam) Just Play	(Vietnam) TPG
STP FOOD Hồ Chí Minh City	Ho Chi Minh City	(Vietnam) Nguyễn Văn Long	(Vietnam) Kamito	(Vietnam) PSL Group
Trường Giang-Gia Định	Ho Chi Minh City	(Vietnam) Nguyễn Hoàng Huân Chương	(Vietnam) Demenino Sport	
Công An Hà Nội B	Hanoi	(Vietnam) Phạm Quang Thành	(Vietnam) CA Sport	(Vietnam) Công An Hà Nội
Hà Nội Bulls	Hanoi	(England) Conor Gavigan	(Vietnam) CR Sport	(Vietnam) CR Sport
Hoài Đức B	Hanoi	(Vietnam) Trần Minh Hiếu	(Vietnam) RIKI Sport	(Vietnam) RIKI Sport
Phù Đổng	Hanoi	(Vietnam) Nguyễn Hồng Phong	(Vietnam) Vloop	(Vietnam) ThaiGroup
Đắk Lắk B	Đắk Lắk	(Vietnam) Trần Phi Ái	(Vietnam) Demenino Sport	
Đào Hà Football Center	Phú Thọ	(Vietnam) Đào Ngọc Huy	(Vietnam) Apollo Sport	(Vietnam) Đào Hà
Đồng Nai FC	Đồng Nai	(Vietnam) Mai Thanh Hùng	Made by club	
Đồng Nai University of Technology	Đồng Nai	(Vietnam) Lê Hữu Phát	(Vietnam) Demenino Sport	
Đồng Tháp B	Đồng Tháp	(Vietnam) Bùi Văn Đông	Made by club	
Hà Tĩnh	Hà Tĩnh	(Vietnam) Đinh Văn Dũng	(Japan) Jogarbola	
Khánh Hòa B	Khánh Hòa	(Vietnam) Huỳnh Hữu Đức	(Vietnam) Demenino Sport	
Luxury Hạ Long	Quảng Ninh	(Vietnam) Trần Công Thành	(Spain) Joma	(Vietnam) PVCB Capital

== Standings ==
17 teams competed in the 2025 season, split into three groups, playing a two-legged round-robin. The three group winners and the best second-placed team promoted to the Second Division.

=== Group A ===
==== Table ====
Pos	Team	Pld	W	D	L	GF	GA	GD	Pts	Promotion
1	Phù Đổng (P)	10	7	2	1	19	8	+11	23 (Note: Head-to-head points: Phù Đổng: 3, CAHN B: 3. Head-to-head goal difference: Phù Đổng: +2, CAHN B: -2.)	Promotion to Second Division
2	Công An Hà Nội B (P)	10	7	2	1	20	5	+15	23	Promotion to Second Division
3	Hoài Đức B	10	5	4	1	18	10	+8	19	
4	Hà Nội Bulls	10	2	2	6	12	14	−2	8	
5	Đào Hà Football Center	10	2	2	6	8	19	−11	8	
6	Luxury Hạ Long	10	1	0	9	6	27	−21	3	

Source: VFF
Rules for classification: 1) Points; 2) Head-to-head record; 3) Goal difference; 4) Number of goals scored; 5) Disciplinary points; 6) Drawing of lots.
(P) Promoted

==== Results ====
Home \ Away	HBU	HDU	HLO	PDO	DHA	CAH
Hà Nội Bulls	—	3–3	3–0 (Note: The Hanoi Bulls v Luxury Hạ Long match originally finished as a 0–0 draw. However, on 31 October 2025, Vietnam Football Federation awarded the match as a 3–0 win to Hà Nội Bulls as Luxury Hạ Long fielded an ineligible player. Luxury Hạ Long were also fined 5,000,000 VND.)	1–3	2–2	0–1
Hoài Đức B	1–0	—	3–0	2–3	2–1	0–0
Luxury Hạ Long	1–0	1–3	—	1–2	1–2	0–6
Phù Đổng	2–1	1–1	3–0	—	2–1	3–0
Đào Hà Football Center	0–2	0–2	2–1	0–0	—	0–2
Công An Hà Nội B	1–0	1–1	3–1	1–0	5–0	—

Source: VFF
Legend: Blue = home team win; Yellow = draw; Red = away team win.

=== Group B ===
==== Table ====
Pos	Team	Pld	W	D	L	GF	GA	GD	Pts	Promotion
1	Hà Tĩnh (P)	8	4	3	1	12	4	+8	15	Promotion to Second Division
2	Khánh Hòa B	8	4	3	1	9	4	+5	15	
3	Becamex Hồ Chí Minh City B	8	3	4	1	10	5	+5	13	
4	Thống Nhất TPG Youth	8	1	4	3	7	11	−4	7	
5	Đắk Lắk B	8	1	0	7	6	20	−14	3	

Source: VFF
Rules for classification: 1) Points; 2) Head-to-head record; 3) Goal difference; 4) Number of goals scored; 5) Disciplinary points; 6) Drawing of lots.
(P) Promoted

==== Results ====
Home \ Away	DLA	BHC	THN	HTI	KHA
Đắk Lắk B	—	1–4	0–1	0–3	1–3
Becamex Hồ Chí Minh City B	2–0	—	1–1	0–0	0–1
Thống Nhất TPG Youth	1–3	1–1	—	1–1	1–1
Hà Tĩnh	4–1	0–1	3–1	—	1–0
Khánh Hòa	2–0	1–1	1–0	0–0	—

Source: VFF
Legend: Blue = home team win; Yellow = draw; Red = away team win.

=== Group C ===
==== Table ====
Pos	Team	Pld	W	D	L	GF	GA	GD	Pts	Promotion
1	Trường Giang-Gia Định (P)	10	8	2	0	25	9	+16	26	Promotion to Second Division
2	Đồng Tháp B	10	4	4	2	28	20	+8	16	
3	STP FOOD Hồ Chí Minh City	10	3	3	4	13	17	−4	12	
4	An Giang	10	3	2	5	11	14	−3	11	
5	Đồng Nai FC	10	3	1	6	26	27	−1	10	
6	Đồng Nai University of Technology	10	3	0	7	14	30	−16	9	

Source: VFF
Rules for classification: 1) Points; 2) Head-to-head record; 3) Goal difference; 4) Number of goals scored; 5) Disciplinary points; 6) Drawing of lots.
(P) Promoted

==== Results ====
Home \ Away	AGI	STP	TGG	DNA	DNU	DTA
An Giang	—	2–0	0–1	2–1	1–2	0–0
STP FOOD Hồ Chí Minh City	2–1	—	1–1	1–4	2–3	1–1
Trường Giang-Gia Định	1–0	1–1	—	4–3	3–1	4–1
Đồng Nai FC	5–2	1–2	1–4	—	0–2	2–4
Đồng Nai University of Technology	0–1	1–2	1–4	1–4	—	3–6
Đồng Tháp B	2–2	2–1	0–2	5–5	7–0	—

Source: VFF
Legend: Blue = home team win; Yellow = draw; Red = away team win.

=== Ranking of second-placed teams ===
Due to the difference of teams between the 3 groups, results of the matches against the last-placed team in each of the six-team groups would not be included in the ranking of the second-placed teams. As a result, only eight matches played by each team will be counted in the second-placed table (Regulations Article 10.1).

Pos	Grp	Team	Pld	W	D	L	GF	GA	GD	Pts	Promotion
1	A	Công An Hà Nội B (P)	8	5	2	1	11	4	+7	17	Promotion to Second Division
2	B	Khánh Hòa B	8	4	3	1	9	4	+5	15	
3	C	Đồng Tháp B	8	2	4	2	15	17	−2	10	

Source: VFF
(P) Promoted
