= 2005 Vietnamese Second Division =

Vietnamese Second Division
- Season: 2015

The 2005 Vietnamese Second Division was the 5th season of the Vietnamese Second Division, the third tier of the Vietnamese football league system. Started on 9 July until 4 September 2005.

== League stage ==
=== Group A ===
Pos	Team	Pld	W	D	L	Y/R	GF	GA	GD	AG	Pts	Promotion or qualification
1	5th Military Region F.C.	14	8	2	4	23/0	18	14	+4	7	26	Qualified for Final and promoted to 2006 Vietnamese First Division
2	4th Military Region F.C.	14	8	1	5	21/1	25	21	+4	9	25	Promoted to 2006 Vietnamese First Division
3	Lam Dong F.C.	14	7	2	5	16/0	18	11	+7	7	23	Qualified for 5th play-off and promoted to 2006 Vietnamese First Division
4	Bia Do Workers F.C	14	6	3	5	28/2	22	19	+3	11	21	
5	Dak Lak F.C.	14	6	2	6	21/3	19	15	+4	7	20	
6	Than Quang Ninh F.C.	14	6	2	6	25/0	16	19	−3	7	20	
7	3rd Military Region F.C.	14	4	2	8	16/1	14	22	−8	4	14	
8	Ha Tinh F.C.	14	4	0	10	22/1	15	26	−11	4	12	

Source: rsssf.com

=== Group B ===
Pos	Team	Pld	W	D	L	Y/R	GF	GA	GD	AG	Pts	Promotion or qualification
1	Tay Ninh F.C.	14	7	5	2	29/0	25	13	+12	5	26	Qualified for Final and promoted to 2006 Vietnamese First Division
2	Ho Chi Minh City F.C.	14	8	2	4	28/0	21	16	+5	6	26	Promoted to 2006 Vietnamese First Division
3	7th Military Region F.C.	14	7	2	5	27/1	20	18	+2	8	23	Qualified for 5th play-off
4	Kien Giang F.C.	14	6	4	4	21/1	20	16	+4	10	22	
5	Dong Tam Roof Tiles Long An	14	5	4	5	22/0	20	19	+1	10	19	
6	Binh Thuan F.C.	14	5	3	6	26/1	17	17	0	4	18	
7	Ben Tre F.C.	14	3	2	9	24/0	11	20	−9	3	11	
8	Vinh Long F.C.	14	3	2	9	26/0	6	21	−15	4	11	

Source: rsssf.com

== 5th play-off ==
23 August 2005
15:30

Lam Dong F.C.	1-1	7th Military Region F.C.
Nguyễn Thông Thắng 84'	Report	Ngọc Thảo 72'
Penalties
	8-7

Chi Lăng Stadium
Attendance: 600
Referee: Dương Mạnh Hùng

== Final ==
23 August 2005

5th Military Region F.C.	3-0	Tay Ninh F.C.
Trung Thành 11'; Đình Quý 20'; Hưng Nguyên 73'	Report

Chi Lăng Stadium
Attendance: 300
Referee: Khánh Hưng
