= 2026 Vietnamese Football League Second Division =

21st season of Vietnamese Second Division

Vietnamese Second Division
- Season: 2026
- Dates: Group stage: 24 March – 7 June 2026; Final round: 13–16 June 2026
- Champions: Hanoi FC B Hue
- Promoted: Hanoi FC B Hue; Lam Dong
- Relegated: Mekong Can Tho; Phu Dong
- Matches: 87
- Goals: 178 (2.05 per match)
- Biggest home win: Hanoi FC B 5–0 Ha Tinh (19 April 2026)
- Biggest away win: Truong Giang-Gia Dinh 0–3 (Note: The Truong Giang-Gia Dinh v Tay Ninh match originally finished as a 0–0 draw. However, on 28 March 2026, Vietnam Football Federation (VFF) awarded the match as a 3–0 win to Tay Ninh as Truong Giang-Gia Dinh fielded Trần Kỳ Anh, who was serving an indefinite suspension by VFF due to match-fixing. Truong Giang-Gia Dinh were also fined 15,000,000 VND.) Tay Ninh (24 March 2026); Phu Dong 1–4 Tay Ninh (11 May 2026)
- Highest scoring: 5 matches
- Longest winning run: Tay Ninh (4 games)
- Longest unbeaten run: Hanoi FC B (12 games)
- Longest winless run: Phu Dong (9 games)
- Longest losing run: Vinh Long; Mekong Can Tho (5 games)

The 2026 Vietnamese Football League Second Division (Vietnamese: Giải bóng đá Hạng Nhì quốc gia 2026, lit. '2026 National Second Division Football League'), also known as 2026 Vietnamese Second Division (Vietnamese: Giải Hạng Nhì quốc gia 2026, lit. '2026 National Second Division') was the 27th season of Vietnamese Football League Second Division. It started on 24 March and concluded on 16 June 2026.

The group tables was drawn on the morning of 10 March 2026.

== Teams ==
=== Team changes ===
Promoted from 2025 Third Division	Relegated from 2024–25 V.League 2	Promoted to 2025–26 V.League 2	Relegated to 2026 Third Division
Cong An Hanoi B Ha Tinh; Phu Dong; Truong Giang-Gia Dinh	Hue	Bac Ninh; Gia Dinh; PVF-CAND B Quang Ninh; Van Hien University	Phu Tho

=== Name and participation slot changes ===
- On 4 September 2025, Kon Tum changed their name to Quảng Ngãi.
- On 26 January 2026, Hoai Duc sold their participation slot to Mekong Can Tho.

=== Stadiums and locations ===
Locations of the 2026 Vietnamese Football League Second Division teams

Team	Location	Stadium	Capacity
Cong An Hanoi B	Hà Nội	Thanh Trì Stadium	4,000
Hanoi FC B	Hà Nội	Thanh Trì Stadium	4,000
Dak Lak FC	Đắk Lắk	Buôn Ma Thuật Stadium	20,000
Ha Tinh	Hà Tĩnh	Hà Tĩnh Stadium	10,000
Hue FC	Huế	Tự Do Stadium	25,000
Lam Dong FC	Lâm Đồng	Đà Lạt Stadium	20,000
Mekong Can Tho	Cần Thơ	Cần Thơ Stadium	30,000
Phu Dong	Bắc Ninh	Từ Sơn Stadium	5,000
PVF	Hưng Yên	PVF Stadium	3,600
Quang Ngai FC	Quảng Ngãi	Quảng Ngãi Stadium	12,000
SHB Da Nang B	Đà Nẵng	Tam Kỳ Stadium	15,000
Tay Ninh FC	Tây Ninh	Tây Ninh Province Sports Training and Competition Center No. 2	1,000
Truong Giang-Gia Dinh	Hồ Chí Minh City	Tân Hiệp Stadium	1,000
Vinh Long FC	Vĩnh Long	Vĩnh Long Stadium	10,000

=== Personnel and kits ===
Note: Flags indicate national team as has been defined under FIFA eligibility rules. Players may hold more than one non-FIFA nationality.

Team	Manager	Kit manufacturer	Shirt sponsor
Cong An Hanoi B	(Vietnam) Phạm Quang Thành	(Japan) Jogarbola	(Vietnam) Công An Hà Nội
Dak Lak	(Vietnam) Trần Phi Ái	(Vietnam) Demenino Sport	
Hanoi FC B	(Vietnam) Phạm Minh Đức	(Japan) Jogarbola	Vegetexco Vietnam
Ha Tinh	(Vietnam) Huỳnh Hữu Đức	(Japan) Jogarbola	
Hue	(Vietnam) Lê Chí Nguyện	(Vietnam) CR Sports	
Lam Dong	(Vietnam) Trần Văn Toàn	(Vietnam) Kamito	
Mekong Can Tho	(Vietnam) Trương Văn Đông	(Vietnam) Kamito	(Vietnam) Bệnh viện Đa Khoa Hoà Hảo - Medic Cần Thơ
Phu Dong	(Vietnam) Nguyễn Hồng Phong	(Vietnam) Vloop	(Vietnam) ThaiGroup
PVF	(Vietnam) Hoàng Tuấn Anh	(Japan) Jogarbola	
Quang Ngai	(Vietnam) Nguyễn Xuân Hiếu	(Vietnam) Aura Revive	(Vietnam) Café de Măng Đen
SHB Da Nang B	(Vietnam) Huỳnh Quốc Anh	(Vietnam) Wika	(Vietnam) SHB
Tay Ninh	(Vietnam) Hồ Thanh Hào	(Vietnam) Just Play	
Trường Giang-Gia Định	(Vietnam) Nguyễn Hoàng Huân Chương	(Vietnam) HABRIX	(Vietnam) Tây Phương Tây
Vinh Long	(Vietnam) Trương Phi	(Vietnam) Vina Authentic	

== Dual ancestry Vietnamese players ==
Beginning on this season, teams are allowed to register 1 Vietnamese player has foreign ancestry and 2 foreign players has Vietnamese ancestry.

- Players name in **bold** indicates the player was registered after the start of the season.

Club	Player 1 (Vietnamese ancestry)	Player 2 (Vietnamese ancestry)	Player 3 (Foreign ancestry)
Cong An Hanoi B	(Australia) Morris Vuong		
Dak Lak			
Hanoi FC B			
Ha Tinh			
Hue			
Lam Dong FC			
Mekong Can Tho	(United States) Kenny Phi Hoang Chandler		
Phu Dong			
PVF			
Quang Ngai			
SHB Da Nang B			
Tay Ninh			
Truong Giang-Gia Dinh			
Vinh Long			

Notes:

^1 Player is under the process of Vietnamese naturalization.

== Standings ==
14 teams competed in the 2026 season, split into two groups 7 teams each, playing a two-legged round-robin. The top two teams from each group advanced to the final round.

=== Group A ===
==== Table ====
Pos	Team	Pld	W	D	L	GF	GA	GD	Pts	Qualification
1	Hanoi FC B	12	6	6	0	19	7	+12	24	Advance to final round
2	Hue	12	6	4	2	19	8	+11	22	Advance to final round
3	Ha Tinh	12	5	2	5	11	17	−6	17	
4	PVF	12	4	5	3	13	10	+3	17	
5	Cong An Hanoi B	12	2	5	5	7	13	−6	11	
6	SHB Da Nang B	12	2	5	5	8	15	−7	11	
7	Phu Dong (R)	12	1	5	6	7	14	−7	8	Relegation to Third Division

Source: VFF
Rules for classification: 1) Points; 2) Head-to-head record; 3) Goal difference; 4) Number of goals scored; 5) Disciplinary points; 6) Drawing of lots.
(R) Relegated

==== Results ====
Home \ Away	CAH	HAN	HTI	HUE	PHD	PVF	SDN
Cong An Hanoi B	—	1–1	0–0	1–3	0–0	2–1	0–0
Hanoi FC B	1–1	—	5–0	1–1	1–0	0–0	2–1
Ha Tinh	2–0	0–1	—	1–0	1–1	1–0	1–2
Hue	1–0	1–1	4–1	—	0–0	1–1	3–0
Phu Dong	0–1	1–4	0–1	0–3	—	0–1	4–1
PVF	2–1	1–2	3–0	2–1	1–1	—	1–1
SHB Da Nang B	2–0	0–0	1–3	0–1	0–0	0–0	—

Updated to match(es) played on compelete. Source: VFF (1st leg), VFF (2nd leg)
Legend: Blue = home team win; Yellow = draw; Red = away team win.

=== Group B ===
==== Table ====
Pos	Team	Pld	W	D	L	GF	GA	GD	Pts	Qualification
1	Lam Dong	12	7	4	1	17	6	+11	25	Advance to final round
2	Truong Giang-Gia Dinh	12	6	4	2	13	7	+6	22 (Note: Head-to-head points: Truong Giang-Gia Dinh: 4; Quang Ngai: 1)	Advance to final round
3	Quang Ngai	12	6	4	2	18	11	+7	22	
4	Tay Ninh	12	5	2	5	17	14	+3	17	
5	Dak Lak	12	3	3	6	10	13	−3	12	
6	Vinh Long	12	3	2	7	9	16	−7	11	
7	Mekong Can Tho (R)	12	1	3	8	5	22	−17	6	Relegation to Third Division

Source: VFF
Rules for classification: 1) Points; 2) Head-to-head record; 3) Goal difference; 4) Number of goals scored; 5) Disciplinary points; 6) Drawing of lots.
(R) Relegated

==== Results ====
Home \ Away	DLA	LDO	MCT	QNG	TNI	TGG	VLO
Dak Lak	—	1–1	3–0	1–2	1–0	0–1	2–0
Lam Dong	1–0	—	3–0	1–1	2–1	2–1	3–0
Mekong Can Tho	1–1	0–1	—	0–2	2–0	0–2	1–1
Quang Ngai	1–0	1–1	3–0	—	2–2	1–1	3–0
Tay Ninh	4–1	0–2	3–0	1–0	—	1–1	2–0
Truong Giang-Gia Dinh	0–0	0–0	2–0	3–0	0–3	—	1–0
Vinh Long	2–0	1–0	1–1	1–2	3–0	0–1	—

Source: VFF (1st leg), VFF (2nd leg)
Legend: Blue = home team win; Yellow = draw; Red = away team win.

== Final round ==
In the final round, if the match ends in a draw in regular time, the match will be decided by a penalty shoot-out. The matches are held in Quy Nhơn Stadium in Gia Lai.

For this round, all 3 matches uses video assistant referee (VAR).

=== Bracket ===
Round 1
13 June
**Hanoi FC B**	**3**
Truong Giang-Gia Dinh	1
13 June
Lam Dong	0
**Hue**	**3**

Round 2
16 June
Truong Giang-Gia Dinh	0 (3)
**Lam Dong**	**0 (4)**

=== Round 1 ===
The winners will be promoted to 2026–27 V.League 2.

13 June 2026
16:00

Hanoi FC B	3–1	Truong Giang-Gia Dinh
Nguyễn Đình Thịnh 45+4'; Nguyễn Anh Tú 63'; Nguyễn Tiến Đạt 86'	Report	Nguyễn Thái Sơn 30'

Quy Nhơn Stadium, Gia Lai
Referee: Trần Huy Hoàng

13 June 2026
19:00

Lam Dong	0–3	Hue
	Report	Nguyễn Mạnh Lâm Sơn 7'; Nguyễn Hữu Tuấn 9', 42'

Quy Nhơn Stadium, Gia Lai
Referee: Nghiêm Bá Trí

=== Round 2 ===
The two losers in the previous round will advance to this round. The winner will be promoted to 2026–27 V.League 2.

16 June 2026
16:00

Truong Giang-Gia Dinh	0–0	Lam Dong
	Report
Penalties
Nguyễn Thái Sơn (penalty scored); Phan Văn Thành Đạt (penalty missed); Sầm Đức Viện (penalty missed); Lại Văn Tú (penalty scored); Phạm Hữu Nhiệu (penalty scored); Bùi Anh Quân (penalty missed)	3–4	(penalty missed) Lê Hoàng Tỷ; (penalty missed) Vũ Hùng Mạnh; (penalty scored) Nguyễn Đình Đức; (penalty scored) Nguyễn Anh Thi; (penalty scored) Nguyễn Hữu Tiệp; (penalty scored) Phùng Khắc Nhất

Quy Nhơn Stadium, Gia Lai
Referee: Đỗ Khánh Nam
