= Dao Ha Football Center =

Association football club in Phú Thọ, Vietnam

- Full name: Dao Ha Football Center (Trung tâm bóng đá Đào Hà)
- Founded: 2005
- Head coach: Đào Ngọc Huy
- League: Vietnamese Third Division
- 2025: Vietnamese Third Division, 5th of 7 (Group A)
- Website: facebook.com
Home colours

Dao Ha Football Center, simple known as Tam Đảo or Đảo Hà, is a Vietnamese professional football club based in Phú Thọ, Vietnam. It competes in the Vietnamese Third Division, the lowest tier of the Vietnamese football league system.

== History ==
In 2005, the Vĩnh Phúc football team was established and competed in the Third Division. The club renamed to Đào Hà Vĩnh Phúc in 2010.

Between 2013 and 2023, the club only entered youth competitions and abandoned its senior sector. In 2019, the club adopted its current name Đào Hà Football Center and started over from the Third Division from the 2024 season.
