= Vietnamese Football League Third Division =

- Organising body: Vietnam Football Federation (VFF)
- Founded: 2005; 21 years ago
- Country: Vietnam
- Confederation: AFC
- Number of clubs: 17
- Level on pyramid: 4
- Promotion to: Second Division
- Domestic cup: Vietnamese Cup
- Current champions: Dong Thap; Tay Mo (1st title)
- Website: https://vff.org.vn
- Current: 2026 Vietnamese Football League Third Division

The Vietnamese Football League Third Division (Vietnamese: Giải bóng đá hạng Ba quốc gia) is the fourth-lowest tier professional association football league in Vietnam, controlled by the Vietnam Football Federation.

== History ==
Vietnamese Third Division was created in 2005, when new clubs has started grown steadily.

In 2008, the league got a record of 23 clubs, the highest in Vietnamese Third Division history. The Organizing Committee had to divide 23 clubs into 4 groups.

== Current season ==
12 teams compete in the 2026 season, split into two groups.

Group A

Team	Location
Bình Định	Gia Lai
Hà Nội B	Hà Nội
Hà Nội Bulls	Hà Nội
Hưng Khôi Hà Nội	Hà Nội
Vạn Xuân Đan Phượng	Hà Nội
Nam Định B	Ninh Bình

Group B

Team	Location
An Giang	An Giang
Đồng Nai	Đồng Nai
Đồng Tháp	Đồng Tháp
Hồ Chí Minh United	Hồ Chí Minh City
STP FOOD Hồ Chí Minh City	Hồ Chí Minh City
Khánh Hòa B	Khánh Hòa

== Winners ==
Season	Teams promoted	Ref
2005	Cà Mau; Quân Khu 2 Quang Ngãi B Sara Thành Vinh; Trảng Bàng	
2006	Hà Nội T&T; Quân Khu 9	
2007	Hòa Phát Hà Nội B TDC Bình Dương	
2008	Maseco Arirang; Thể Công B	
2009	DIC Bà Rịa-Vũng Tàu; Megastar E&C Nam Định	
2010	Bình Phước; Phú Yên; Thống Nhất 08	
2011	Khatoco Khánh Hòa B Sài Gòn Xuân Thành B	
2012	Viettel; Vĩnh Long	
2013	Bến Tre; Bình Phước; Đồng Nai B Kom Tum; Lâm Đồng	
2014	Bình Định; Mancons Sài Gòn	
2015	An Giang; Hà Nội T&T B PVF; Viettel B	
2016	Kon Tum; Phù Đổng	
2017	Bà Rịa Vũng Tàu; Nam Định B Quảng Ngãi; Vĩnh Long	
2018	Hà Nội C Hoàng Sang HCMC; SHB Đà Nẵng B	
2019	Đồng Nai; Hồ Chí Minh City Youth; PVF; Tuấn Tú Phú Thọ	
2020	Hải Nam Vĩnh Phúc; Quảng Nam B	
2021	Season cancelled due to COVID-19 pandemic	
2022	Dugong Kiên Giang; Luxury Hạ Long	
2023	Định Hướng Phú Nhuận; Hà Nội B	
2024	Hoài Đức; Gia Định; PVF-CAND B Quảng Ninh; Táy Ninh	
2025	Phù Đổng; Công An Hà Nội B Hà Tĩnh; Trường Giang-Gia Định	
2026	An Giang; Hà Nội B Đồng Tháp; Tây Mỗ	
