= Lê Hữu Phát =

Vietnamese footballer (born 1988)

Personal information
- Full name: Lê Hữu Phát
- Date of birth: February 11, 1988 (age 38)
- Place of birth: Long Thành, Đồng Nai, Vietnam
- Height: 1.68 m (5 ft 6 in)
- Position: Midfielder

Youth career
- 2001–2009: Đồng Nai

Senior career*
Years	Team	Apps	(Gls)
2010–2021	Đồng Nai	298	(94)
- * Club domestic league appearances and goals

Lê Hữu Phát (born 11 February 1988) is a Vietnamese footballer who plays for the Đồng Nai as a midfielder.
