= Hanoi Bulls FC =

- Full name: Hanoi Bulls FC (Câu lạc bộ bóng đá Hanoi Bulls)
- Founded: 20 June 2023; 3 years ago
- Ground: Xuân La Stadium
- Owner: Conor Gavigan
- Head coach: Conor Gavigan
- League: Vietnamese Third Division
- 2025: Vietnamese Third Division, 4th of 6 (Group A)
- Website: facebook.com
Primary colours

Hanoi Bulls Football Club, commonly known as Hanoi Bulls FC (Vietnamese: Câu lạc bộ bóng đá Hanoi Bulls), is an semi-professional football club based in Hanoi, Vietnam. The club currently competes in the Vietnamese Third Division, the lowest tier of Vietnamese football. The club's home ground is the Xuân La Stadium, in Tây Hồ, Hanoi.

== History ==
Hanoi Bulls was founded on 20 June 2023 by English manager and UEFA B-level coach Conor James Gavigan, who had been active for several years in Hanoi's amateur football scene. Following a series of player trials, the club officially began competing in local amateur football tournaments in Hanoi.

In 2025, Hanoi Bulls participates in the Vietnamese Third Division.

== Players ==
As of 10 November 2025

Note: Flags indicate national team as defined under FIFA eligibility rules; some limited exceptions apply. Players may hold more than one non-FIFA nationality.

No.	Pos.	Nation	Player
20	GK	VIE	Nguyễn Phú Quý
4		VIE	Trần Văn Tùng
5		VIE	Vì Tiến Đạt
7		VIE	Bùi Thành Huy
9		VIE	Hoàng Ngọc Sơn
10		VIE	Lê Viết Long
11		VIE	Bùi Mạnh Tú
12		VIE	Nguyễn Lương Bắng
14		VIE	Lê Trường Huy
16		VIE	Trần Tuấn Huy (captain)
25		VIE	Lưu Bùi Việt Anh

No.	Pos.	Nation	Player
1	GK	VIE	Nguyễn Đình Bảo
—		VIE	Nguyễn Văn Duy
—		VIE	Hà Văn Thao
—		VIE	Lê Thế Nhật Anh
29		VIE	Đỗ Lai Huy
—		VIE	Phan Việt Thiện
19		VIE	Vũ Tiến Đạt
—		VIE	Đoàn Quốc Việt
27		VIE	Nguyễn Văn Được
—		VIE	Lê Minh Hưng
24		VIE	Nguyễn Thanh Dương
