= Dong Nai FC =

Association football club in Vietnam

Đồng Nai
- Full name: Đồng Nai Football Club
- Nickname: The Cù Lao Phố team
- Founded: 1980; 46 years ago
- Ground: Đồng Nai Stadium
- Capacity: 30,000
- Chairman: Nguyễn Văn Minh
- Manager: Mai Thanh Hùng
- League: Vietnamese Third Division
- 2025: Vietnamese Third Division, 5th of 6 (Group C)
Home colours	Away colours	Third colours

Đồng Nai Football Club is a professional association football club based in Đồng Nai municipality, Vietnam. The team currently plays in Vietnamese Third Division, the fourth tier of Vietnamese football, after a demotion from the 2024–25 V.League 2 due to financial reasons. The club's home ground is the 30,000-seater Đồng Nai Stadium.

== History ==
=== Early football movement (pre-1975) ===
Between 1955 and 1975, Đồng Nai had four teams competed in the first and second tier of the South Vietnam football system: Sư Đoàn 3 Không Quân, Tiểu Khu Biên Hòa, Không Đoàn Kỹ Thuật - Tiếp Vận and Thanh Niên Hiệp Hòa.

=== Founding and amateur era (1976–2004) ===
After 1975, football was the first sport to be formally organized in the new province. In March 1976, the Department of Sports and Physical Education established the provincial football team of Đồng Nai/ They participated in the first post-unification tournament, the Cửu Long League, finishing 8th out of 9 teams.

The team spent many years in the A1 Division, the second-tier at the time. From 1990 to 1999, Đồng Nai reached the final promotion round for the top-tier league three times (1990, 1994, 1998) but was unsuccessful each time. During this period, Đồng Nai province was unique for having three teams in the A1 Division simultaneously: Đồng Nai FC, Xuân Lộc, and Cao Su Đồng Nai.

=== Professional era and promotion to the V.League 1 (2005–2016) ===
In 2005, the team (having merged with Cao Su Đồng Nai) turned professional. With sponsorship from the Strata Group, the club was renamed Strata Đồng Nai FC and earned promotion to the First Division. In 2008, the Đồng Nai Football Joint Stock Company was established and the team found a new sponsor, Berjaya Corporation, changing their name to Đồng Nai Berjaya FC.

In the 2012 season, Dong Nai finished third in the V.League 2, a position that did not grant promotion. However, the club was given a "special promotion" to 2013 V.League 1 to ensure the league had 12 teams.

At the end of the 2015 V.League 1 season, Đồng Nai finished last and was relegated to the V.League 2.

=== Relegation and rebuild (2017–present) ===
Following their relegation from V.League 1, Đồng Nai did not enter the 2016 V.League 2. In 2017, the club started over from the Vietnamese Third Division with a core of local U-19 players. In 2019, the team finished second in their group and promoted to the 2020 Second Division. They remained in the Second Division for four seasons.

In the 2023 Second Division, Đồng Nai finished second in Group B to qualify for the promotion play-off. In the final, they defeated Đắk Lắk 2–1, with a brace from Cao Quốc Khánh to earn promotion back to the V.League 2.

=== Restructuration to an amateur team ===
The finished 9th in the 2024–25 V.League 2 season. In mid-2025, following the merge of Bình Phước province into Đồng Nai province, Đồng Nai FC ceased receiving financial support from the province, as Trường Tươi Bình Phước was prioritized as the province's representative team. As the result, Đồng Nai withdrew from the 2025–26 V.League 2 and was restructured into a youth team. They entered the 2025 Vietnamese Third Division.

== Stadium ==
The club's home ground is Đồng Nai Stadium. The stadium has a capacity of approximately 25,000 spectators. In 2013, to meet V.League 1 standards, the stadium was upgraded with a new lighting system of 1,200–1,400 lux at a cost of over 20 billion VND.

== Kit suppliers and sponsors ==
Period	Kit manufacturer	Shirt sponsor
2003–2005		Strata
2008–2010		Berjaya (Malaysia)
2022–present	Demenino Sport	Dien Bao Nguyen, Hai Thanh Group, Vinatexin, LPBank

== Current squad ==
As of 12 March 2025

Note: Flags indicate national team as defined under FIFA eligibility rules; some limited exceptions apply. Players may hold more than one non-FIFA nationality.

No.	Pos.	Nation	Player
3	DF	VIE	Trần Như Tân
4	DF	VIE	Nguyễn Bảo Chung
5	MF	VIE	Phạm Quốc Tuấn
6	MF	VIE	Bùi Duy Nam
7	MF	VIE	Hoàng Xuân Phú
8	MF	VIE	Bùi Xuân Lộc
9	MF	VIE	Nguyễn Hải Chi Nguyện (on loan from Quy Nhơn Bình Định)
10	FW	VIE	Cao Quốc Khánh
11	MF	VIE	Huỳnh Kim Hùng
12	MF	VIE	Trần Đình Bảo
14	MF	VIE	Đinh Thanh Trung
15	DF	VIE	Phạm Đăng Tuấn
16	MF	VIE	Vũ Văn Việt
17	DF	VIE	Nguyễn Thái Sơn
18	MF	VIE	Phạm Văn Soạn

No.	Pos.	Nation	Player
19	FW	VIE	Đỗ Tấn Thành
20	FW	VIE	Lương Thanh Sang
21	DF	VIE	Nguyễn Gia Đoàn
22	MF	VIE	Điểu Quy (on loan from Truong Tuoi Binh Phuoc)
23	GK	VIE	Nguyễn Huỳnh Văn Bin
24	MF	VIE	Lê Hoàng Dương
28	FW	VIE	Nguyễn Khắc Khiêm
33	DF	VIE	Đào Tấn Lộc
36	DF	VIE	Nguyễn Hữu Lâm
39	FW	VIE	Hà Trung Hậu (on loan from Becamex Binh Duong)
66	DF	VIE	Trần Tuấn Thành
77	MF	VIE	Đoàn Chí Bảo
86	MF	VIE	Nguyễn Công Tiến
89	GK	VIE	Nguyễn Võ Chí Cường
97	GK	VIE	Võ Văn Sơn

== Current coaching staff ==
Position	Name
General manager	(Vietnam) Nguyễn Văn Long
Head coach	(Vietnam) Nguyễn Minh Phương
Assistant coach	(Vietnam) Phan Thế Hiếu
Goalkeeping coach	(Vietnam) Nguyễn Hoàng Duy
Team doctor	(Vietnam) Trần Mạnh Trí

== Honours ==
- Tay Ninh TV Cup
  - Champions (2): 2009, 2010
  - Runners-up (1): 2007
- Vietnamese Football League Second Division
  - Champions (1): 2023
- Vietnamese National Cup
  - Third place (3): 2013

== Season-by-season domestical record ==
Season	Pld	Won	Draw	Lost	GF	GA	GD	PTS	Final position	Notes
2005 First Division	22	6	4	11	19	20	−1	23	10th	
2006 First Division	26	8	9	9	30	28	+2	33	7th	
2007 First Division	26	12	6	8	31	24	+7	42	4th	
2008 First Division	26	7	9	10	33	33	0	30	8th	
2009 First Division	24	7	7	10	26	30	−4	28	9th	
2010 First Division	24	6	8	10	27	31	−4	26	12th	
2011 First Division	26	9	9	8	34	35	−1	36	7th	
2012 First Division	26	11	7	8	40	30	+10	40	3rd	Promotion to V.League 1
2013 V.League 1	20	6	7	7	27	36	−9	25	7th	
2014 V.League 1	22	7	4	11	39	40	−1	25	7th	
2015 V.League 1	26	5	6	15	35	52	−17	21	14th	Relegation to V.League 2
2016 V.League 2	18	8	6	4	24	17	+7	30	4th	Demotion to Vietnamese Third Division due to financial issues
2017 Third Division	3	1	1	1	5	5	0	4	3rd (Group B)	
2018 Third Division	3	0	0	3	3	6	-3	0	4th (Group B)	
2019 Third Division	3	1	1	1	3	3	0	4	2nd (Group B)	Promotion to Vietnamese Second Division
2020 Second Division	14	4	0	10	16	30	-14	12	6th (Group B)	
2021 Second Division	1	0	1	0	1	1	0	1	4th (Group B)	Season cancelled due to Covid-19 pandemic
2022 Second Division	12	8	1	3	19	6	+13	25	1st (Group B)	Defeated in the promotion play-offs
2023 Second Division	12	6	4	2	30	15	+15	22	2nd (Group B)	Won the promotion play-offs and promotion to V.League 2
2023–24 V.League 2	20	6	5	9	12	21	−9	23	9th	
2024–25 V.League 2	20	3	9	8	13	20	−7	18	9th	Demotion to Vietnamese Third Division due to financial issues
2025 Third Division	10	3	1	6	26	27	−1	10	5th (Group C)	
