= Phu Dong FC (2025) =

Vietnamese football club

Phù Đổng FC
- Full name: Phù Đổng Football Club (Câu lạc bộ bóng đá Phù Đổng)
- Founded: 15 September 2025; 12 months ago
- Ground: Từ Sơn Stadium
- Capacity: 5,000
- Chairman: Phạm Duy Vinh
- Head coach: Nguyễn Hồng Phong
- League: Vietnamese Third Division
- 2026: Vietnamese Second Division, 7th of 7 (Group A, relegated)
- Website: facebook.com
Primary colours

Phu Dong Football Club (Vietnamese: Câu lạc bộ bóng đá Phù Đổng), is a Vietnamese semi-professional football club based in Hanoi, Vietnam. They play their home matches in the 5,000-capacity Từ Sơn Stadium in Bắc Ninh. The club currently competes at the Vietnamese Third Division, the fourth-lowest tier of Vietnamese football.

== History ==
Following the ownership transfer and name change of the former Phù Đổng team to Ninh Bình FC, Phù Đổng was re-established on 15 September 2025. The club's logo was based on the former Phù Đổng logo with small modifications. Two days after the announcement, the club officially announced ThaiGroup as their main sponsor for 5 years. The club then appointed Trương Việt Hoàng as technical director. In October 2025, the club entried the 2025 Vietnamese Third Division.

== Sponsorship ==
Period	Kit supplier	Shirt sponsor
2025–present	Vloop	LPBank

== Players ==
Note: Flags indicate national team as defined under FIFA eligibility rules; some limited exceptions apply. Players may hold more than one non-FIFA nationality.

No.	Pos.	Nation	Player
1	GK	VIE	Trần Ngọc Anh
2		VIE	Nguyễn Trọng Tú
4		VIE	Nguyễn Gia Bảo
5		VIE	Trần Đức Bình
6		VIE	Phan Minh Thành
7		VIE	Nguyễn Quốc Khánh
8		VIE	Nguyễn Đức Mạnh
9		VIE	Đồng Việt Dũng
10		VIE	Trần Văn Quyền
11		VIE	Lê Ngọc Vinh
12		VIE	Hoàng Minh Đạt
14		VIE	Trần Quang Vinh
15		VIE	Lê Đức Phát
17		VIE	Nguyễn Phương Thành
19		VIE	Trần Công Hoàng

No.	Pos.	Nation	Player
20		VIE	Nguyễn Đình Huấn
22		VIE	Lê Thế Thắng
23		VIE	Nguyễn Công Sơn
24		VIE	Đỗ Hoàng Long
25	GK	VIE	Nguyễn Quang Huy
26	GK	VIE	Nguyễn Gia Hào
29		VIE	Nguyễn Thanh Lâm
32		VIE	Trần Duy Khánh
34		VIE	Nguyễn An Phát
37		VIE	Đặng Tuấn Minh
79		VIE	Nguyễn Tiến Vũ
89		VIE	Trương Quang Hoàn
99		VIE	Nguyễn Trọng Kiệt
—		VIE	Đỗ Tấn Hoàng
—		VIE	Nguyễn Đức Lương
