= Lam Dong FC =

Vietnamese football club

- Full name: Câu lạc bộ bóng đá Lâm Đồng (Lam Dong Football Club)
- Nickname: The Highland Whirlwind
- Founded: 1990; 36 years ago
- Ground: Đà Lạt Stadium
- Capacity: 20,000
- Chairman: Thái Khắc Ngọ
- Manager: Trần Văn Toàn
- League: V.League 2
- 2026: Vietnamese Second Division, 1st of 7 (Group B, promoted)
Home colours	Away colours	Third colours

Lam Dong Football Club (Vietnamese: Câu lạc bộ bóng đá Lâm Đồng) is a Vietnamese football club based in Lâm Đồng. The club uses the 20,000-capacity Đà Lạt Stadium as the home stadium. They currently play in the V.League 2, as winners in the 2026 Vietnamese Second Division play-offs.

== History ==
=== Golden era: "The Highland Whirlwind" (1990s) ===
Founded in 1979, Lâm Đồng was promoted to the A1 League (currently V.League 1) in 1983 and remained the only representative from the Central Highlands in Vietnam's top league for 14 consecutive seasons. The 1990s were the club's most successful period.

With the advantage of their high-altitude, cold-climate home ground, Đà Lạt Stadium, Lâm Đồng was nearly unbeatable at home, turning it into a feared "fortress" for all opponents, including powerhouses like Thể Công and Cảng Sài Gòn.

In 1994, the club was part of an infamous "betrayal" incident with Công An Hải Phòng. After being double-crossed, coach Đoàn Phùng led his team to a 1–0 victory that saved Lâm Đồng and relegated Công An Hải Phòng. The peak of this era was a historic third-place finish in the 1997 Vietnamese First Division.

=== Period of instability (2003–2012) ===
After its golden age, Lâm Đồng's performance declined, leading to relegation in 2003. In 2005, they won a dramatic playoff against Quân Khu 7 8–7 in a penalty shootout after 12 rounds to return to the First Division, only to be relegated again the next season.

In 2011, the team finished as runners-up in the Second Division to earn promotion once more. In the 2012 season, under the name XSKT Lâm Đồng and coach Vũ Quang Bảo, they successfully avoided relegation.

=== Crisis and rebuilding (2013–present) ===
In 2013, the club faced a major financial crisis and had to withdraw from professional football, restarting from the Third Division.

Since then, Lâm Đồng has consistently competed in the Second Division. The 2025 season was particularly heartbreaking. They led their group until the final matchday, but a 0–2 loss against Gia Định saw them drop to third place due to head-to-head results, narrowly missing promotion. After several teams in upper divisions withdrew from the league, the club an invited by the VPF to be promoted to the 2025–26 V.League 2 but subsequently declined, citing the need for better preparation.

In the 2026 Second Division, Lâm Đồng finished first in their group and advanced to the promotion play-offs. They were defeated 0–3 by Huế in the first play-off round, leading them to play a second promotion play-off round against Trường Giang Gia Định. There, they beat their opponent in the penalty shootout and secured their spot in the 2026–27 V.League 2, returning to the Vietnamese professional league after 14 years.

== Colours and crest ==
The club's traditional colour is green. The nickname "The Highland Whirlwind" was coined in the 1990s to reflect the team's fast, physical, and unpredictable style of play, especially at their home ground in Đà Lạt.

== Stadium ==
The club's home ground is Đà Lạt Stadium, inaugurated on 31 December 2023 on the base of the former stadium. It has a capacity of approximately 20,000 and is one of the most modern sports facilities in the Central Highlands region.

== Current squad ==
As of 11 September 2026

Note: Flags indicate national team as defined under FIFA eligibility rules; some limited exceptions apply. Players may hold more than one non-FIFA nationality.

No.	Pos.	Nation	Player
4	DF	VIE	Trương Hải Đăng
5	DF	VIE	Lê Cao Hoài An
6	MF	VIE	Võ Ngọc Tỉnh
7	MF	VIE	Nguyễn Anh Thi
8	MF	VIE	Lê Hoàng Luân
9	MF	VIE	Nguyễn Văn Đình
10	FW	VIE	Vũ Hùng Mạnh
11	MF	VIE	Trần Hoàng Phương
12	DF	VIE	Phùng Khắc Nhất
14	DF	VIE	Nguyễn Văn Dũng (on loan from Thanh Hóa)
15	FW	VIE	Trần Duy Quốc Hoàng
18	MF	VIE	K'Toàn
19	DF	VIE	Đinh Thành Đạt (on loan from Hoàng Anh Gia Lai)
20	MF	VIE	Huỳnh Quang Thái
21	MF	VIE	Nguyễn Thế Thắng
23	GK	VIE	Nguyễn Thanh Phú

No.	Pos.	Nation	Player
24	GK	VIE	Trương Lâm Nhật
26	GK	VIE	Trương Lê Hải Tuấn
27	DF	VIE	Nguyễn Đình Đức
30	MF	VIE	Đỗ Văn Chí
36	FW	VIE	Nguyễn Xuân Nam
37	FW	VIE	Phùng Văn Nam (on loan from Sông Lam Nghệ An)
40	FW	VIE	Lê Anh Toàn (on loan from SHB Đà Nẵng)
43	DF	VIE	Nguyễn Thành Khải (on loan from SHB Đà Nẵng)
63	MF	VIE	Nguyễn Thành Vinh (on loan from SHB Đà Nẵng)
79	FW	VIE	Phan Duy Hào (on loan from Sông Lam Nghệ An)
81	FW	VIE	Nguyễn Vũ Trường Giang
88	MF	VIE	Bùi Xuân Lộc
89	DF	VIE	Khúc Trung Hiếu
94	MF	VIE	Lê Hoàng Tỷ
95	MF	VIE	Nguyễn Đoàn Duy Anh
99	DF	VIE	K'Mis

== Coaching staff ==
Position	Name
Head coach	(Vietnam) Trần Văn Toàn
Assistant coach	(Vietnam) Nguyễn Duy Lợi (Vietnam) Trương Quang Bình
Logistics	(Vietnam) Nguyễn Minh Hoàng

== Managerial history ==
Dates	Name
1990–2000	(Vietnam) Đoàn Phùng
2000–?	(Vietnam) Đinh Xuân Thành
2006	(Vietnam) Lưu Mộng Hùng
2008–2011	(Vietnam) Nguyễn Mạnh Quý
2011–2012	(Vietnam) Vũ Quang Bảo
2013–2017	(Vietnam) Đoàn Quốc Việt
2018–2021	(Vietnam) Nguyễn Mạnh Quý
2022	(Vietnam) Hứa Hiền Vinh
2022–2023	(Thailand) Issawa Singthong
2023–2025	(Vietnam) Đoàn Quốc Việt
2026–present	(Vietnam) Trần Văn Toàn

== Honours ==
- V.League 1
  - Third place (1): 1997
- Vietnamese Second Division
  - Runners-up (1): 2011
