= Hoai Duc FC =

Vietnamese football club

Hoài Đức FC
- Full name: Câu lạc bộ bóng đá Hoài Đức (Hoai Duc Football Club)
- Founded: October 2024; 1 year ago
- Ground: Hoài Đức Stadium
- Capacity: 3,000
- League: Vietnamese Football League Second Division
- 2025: Second Division, 6th of 7 (Group A)
- Website: facebook.com

Hoai Duc Football Club is a football club based in Hanoi, Vietnam, that competes in the Vietnamese Football League Second Division, the third level of the Vietnamese football league system. The club play their home games at the Hoài Đức Stadium.

== History ==
The club was founded in October 2024, they joined the Third Division, and made promotion to Second Division after finishing 2nd on Group A in just one season.

Afterwards, they stand 6th of 7 in Group A under Second Division on a second season.
