= Phu Yen FC =

Professional football club

Phú Yên
- Full name: Phú Yên Football Club
- Founded: 1989
- Ground: Phú Yên Stadium Tuy Hòa, Phú Yên, Vietnam
- Capacity: 5,000
- Chairman: Cao Hồng Quang
- Manager: Đinh Hồng Vinh
- League: Vietnamese Football League Third Division
- 2024: Third Division, 6th of 8 (Group B)
Home colours	Away colours

Phú Yên Football Club (Vietnamese: Câu lạc bộ bóng đá Phú Yên) is a professional football club, based in Tuy Hòa, Phú Yên, Vietnam, that plays in the Vietnamese Third Division, the fourth tier of Vietnamese football.

== Current squad ==
As of April 2017

Note: Flags indicate national team as defined under FIFA eligibility rules; some limited exceptions apply. Players may hold more than one non-FIFA nationality.

No.	Pos.	Nation	Player
1	GK	VIE	Phạm Văn Khải
2	DF	VIE	Phạm Hoàng Đức
3	DF	VIE	Nguyễn Văn Lâm
4	DF	VIE	Nguyễn Ngọc Tâm
5	DF	VIE	Bùi Văn Đông
6	MF	VIE	Nguyễn Minh Hoàng
7	MF	VIE	Thái Công Hoàng
8	MF	VIE	Vũ Văn Hiếu
9	FW	VIE	Vũ Quang Nam
10	FW	VIE	Trương Văn Thành
11	FW	VIE	Ngô Xuân Hoàng
12	MF	VIE	Nguyễn Long Hiệp
13	MF	VIE	Nguyễn Tấn Quyền
14	DF	VIE	Nguyễn Đức Thiện Chánh

No.	Pos.	Nation	Player
15	MF	VIE	Lê Văn Sang
16	MF	VIE	Bùi Đình Châu
17	MF	VIE	Nguyễn Xuân Tâm
18	MF	VIE	Nguyễn Thanh Nam
19	DF	VIE	Lê Văn Hiệp
20	FW	VIE	Nguyễn Văn Thạch
21	DF	VIE	Phạm Văn Tân
22	MF	VIE	Hoàng Vũ Đạt
23	FW	VIE	Âu Dương Thanh
24	DF	VIE	Lê Lâm Nhật
25	MF	VIE	Lưu Tấn Liêm
39	GK	VIE	Nguyễn Đăng Khôi
45	FW	VIE	Nguyễn Chí Vỹ
79	GK	VIE	Trần Văn Chiến
