= Cong An Hanoi FC Reserves and Academy =

Vietnam association football team and the reserve team of Cong An Hanoi FC

Câu lạc bộ bóng đá Trẻ Công an Hà Nội
- Full name: Cong An Hanoi Football Club
- Short name: CAHN B
- Founded: 2017; 9 years ago
- Ground: Thanh Trì Stadium
- Capacity: 4,000
- Chairman: Nguyễn Tiến Đạt
- Head coach: Phạm Quang Thành
- League: Vietnamese Second Division
- 2026: Vietnamese Second Division, 5th of 7 (Group A)
- Website: Official website
Home colours	Away colours	Third colours

Cong An Hanoi Football Club Reserves (Vietnamese: Câu lạc bộ bóng đá Trẻ Công an Hà Nội) are the reserves team of the Vietnam association football club Cong An Hanoi, currently playing in the Second Division.

== History ==
Established in the 2010s as the reserves team and academy of Công An Nhân Dân, the team regularly competes in Vietnamese youth championships. In 2017, the reserves team of Công An Nhân Dân entered the Vietnamese Third Division.

Following the rebranding of Công An Nhân Dân to Công An Hà Nội in 2022, all the players from Công An Nhân Dân's youth sectors were transferred to the new team. Their first appearance was 2023 season of the Vietnamese Third Division, where they finished 4th on Group A on their first season.

== Players ==
=== Squad ===
As of 22 March 2026

Note: Flags indicate national team as defined under FIFA eligibility rules; some limited exceptions apply. Players may hold more than one non-FIFA nationality.

No.	Pos.	Nation	Player
—	GK	VIE	Nguyễn Lâm Trí Dũng
—	GK	VIE	Nguyễn Đức Hiếu
—	GK	VIE	Bùi Tiến Thành
—	DF	VIE	Nguyễn Đức Hùng
—	DF	VIE	Nguyễn Đình Trí Đức
—	DF	VIE	Vũ Đức Huy
—	DF	VIE	Đinh Văn Điện
—	DF	VIE	Lê Hoàng An
—	DF	VIE	Nguyễn Thanh Bình
—	DF	VIE	Hà Công Thành
—	DF	VIE	Nguyễn Văn Huy
—	DF	VIE	Trịnh Hoa Hùng
—	DF	VIE	Ngô Quốc Dương
—	DF	VIE	Nguyễn Hoàng Dũng
—	MF	VIE	Trần Đức Bình
—	MF	VIE	Trương Công Bằng

No.	Pos.	Nation	Player
—	MF	VIE	Trần Hồng Minh
—	MF	VIE	Hoàng Tùng Dương
—	MF	VIE	Tăng Hoài Nam
—	MF	VIE	Bùi Huy Đức
—	MF	VIE	Nguyễn Quốc Đạt
—	MF	VIE	Vũ Thành Công
—	MF	VIE	Đỗ Duy Nam
—	MF	VIE	Nguyễn Khánh Hoàng
—	MF	VIE	Hứa Khải Bình
—	FW	VIE	Bùi Anh Thống
—	FW	AUS	Morris Vuong
—	FW	VIE	Lê Đức Toàn
—	FW	VIE	Cò Văn Hưởng
—	FW	VIE	Vũ Long Nhật
—	FW	VIE	Trần Công Thế Bảo

== Honours ==
Youth tournaments

- Vietnam National U-19 Championship

(bronze) Third place : 2020

== Recent managers ==
- Phạm Quang Thành (2017, 2023–present)

== Domestic record ==
The recent season-by-season performance of the club:

Season	Division	Tier	Position	Group
2017	Third Division	IV	3	A
2022	Third Division	IV	6	A
2023	Third Division	IV	4	A
2024	Third Division	IV	4	A
2025	Third Division	IV	1 ↑	A
2026	Second Division	III	5	A

↑ Promoted	↓ Relegated	Champions

== Notable alumnis ==
Below is a non-exhaustive list of notable players who trained in the youth or reserve teams of Cong An Hanoi:

- (Vietnam) Bùi Anh Thống
- (Vietnam) Bùi Văn Đức
- (Vietnam) Bùi Xuân Thịnh
- (Vietnam) Chu Văn Kiên
- (Vietnam) Giáp Tuấn Dương
- (Vietnam) Hà Văn Phương
- (Vietnam) Hoàng Văn Toản
- (Vietnam) Khổng Minh Gia Bảo
- (Vietnam) La Nguyễn Bảo Trung
- (Vietnam) Phạm Minh Phúc
- (Vietnam) Trần Quang Thịnh
- (Vietnam) Vũ Thành Vinh
