= Truong Giang-Gia Dinh FC =

Vietnamese football club

Trường Giang-Gia Định
- Full name: Trường Giang-Gia Định Football Club (Câu lạc bộ bóng đá Trường Giang-Gia Định)
- Founded: 2010s
- Ground: Tân Hiệp Stadium
- Capacity: 1,000
- Owner(s): Tây Phương Construction Investment Design Co., Ltd.
- Head coach: Nguyễn Hoàn Huân Chương
- League: Vietnamese Second Division
- 2025: Vietnamese Third Division, 1st of 6 (Group C, champions)
- Website: Truong Giang-Gia Dinh FC on Facebook
Primary colours

Trường Giang-Gia Định Football Club (Vietnamese: Câu lạc bộ bóng đá Trường Giang-Gia Định), is a Vietnamese semi-professional football club based in Ho Chi Minh City, Vietnam. They play their home matches in the 1,000-capacity Tân Hiệp Stadium. The club currently competes at the Vietnamese Second Division, the third tier of Vietnamese football.

== History ==
The club was created as Trường Giang FC in the 2010s, playing in Ho Chi Minh City amateur tournaments. In 2025, the club was merged with some part of the former Gia Định team, thus become Trường Giang-Gia Định, with Tây Phương Construction Investment Design Co., Ltd. as the owner of the club.

In the 2025 Vietnamese Third Division, the club promoted to 2026 Vietnamese Second Division by having 2 games to spare.

== Players ==
=== Current squad ===
As of 2 May 2026

Note: Flags indicate national team as defined under FIFA eligibility rules; some limited exceptions apply. Players may hold more than one non-FIFA nationality.

No.	Pos.	Nation	Player
1	GK	VIE	Nguyễn Võ Chí Cường
3	DF	VIE	Trương Lĩnh Nam
5	DF	VIE	Vũ Hữu Quý
6	DF	VIE	Bùi Anh Quân
7	MF	VIE	Lê Nác Đô
9	FW	VIE	Lưu Công Sơn
10	MF	VIE	Phan Văn Thành Đạt
11	FW	VIE	Khuất Thế Hùng
12	DF	VIE	Lại Văn Tú
13	FW	VIE	Dương Vĩnh Khang
15	DF	VIE	Tiêu Ê Xal
16	DF	VIE	Phạm Hữu Nhiệu

No.	Pos.	Nation	Player
17	FW	VIE	Sầm Đức Viện
20	DF	VIE	Trịnh Văn Hà
21	MF	VIE	Lư Đình Đức Anh
22	DF	VIE	Nguyễn Thái Sơn
24	GK	VIE	Lê Anh Trí
25	MF	VIE	Trương Nguyên Long
26	GK	VIE	Nguyễn Nhật Nguyên
29	DF	VIE	Trần Việt Hài
30	FW	VIE	Bùi Thế Phong
33	FW	VIE	Đặng Khánh Đăng
51	MF	VIE	Ngô Sỹ Chinh
81	MF	VIE	Bùi Huy Hoàng

=== Unregistred players ===
Note: Flags indicate national team as defined under FIFA eligibility rules; some limited exceptions apply. Players may hold more than one non-FIFA nationality.

No.	Pos.	Nation	Player
8	MF	VIE	Trần Kỳ Anh

== Coaching staff ==
Position	Staff
Head coach	(Vietnam) Nguyễn Hoàng Huân Chương
Assistant head coach	(Vietnam) Mai Thanh Nam
Goalkeeping coach	(Vietnam) Trần Văn Hóa
Doctor	(Vietnam) Hồ Văn Hóa
