= Vietnamese football league system =

The Vietnamese football league system contains two professional leagues and two semi-professional leagues for Vietnamese football clubs.

== System by period ==
Season	Tier 1			Tier 2	Tier 3	Tier 4	Tier 5
1950–1955	Northern league not existed						
1950–1955	South Vietnam Division of Honour			South Vietnam Second League	None		
1955	Hòa Bình League A (Peace league A)			Hòa Bình League B (Peace league B)	None		
1955	South Vietnam Division of Honour			South Vietnam First Division	South Vietnam Second Division	None	
1956	Thống nhất League A (Unification League A)			Unification League B	None		
1956	South Vietnam Division of Honour			South Vietnam First Division	South Vietnam Second Division	None	
1957–1975	North Vietnam National Class A League			North Vietnam National Class B League	North Vietnam National Class C League	Local leagues	None
1957–1975	South Vietnam Division of Honour			South Vietnam First Division	South Vietnam Second Division	Thiếu Niên League	Lão Tướng League
1976–1979	Hồng Hà league (Northern area)	Trường Sơn league (Central area)	Cửu Long league (Southern area)	Local leagues	None		
1980–1989	National A1 League			National A2 League	National B League	None	
1990–1996	National Elite Football Championship			National A1 League	National A2 League	National B League	None
1997–2000	National First Division			National Second Division	National Third Division	None	
2000–2012	V-League			National First Division	National Second Division	National Third Division	None
2013–	V.League 1			V.League 2	National Second Division	National Third Division	None

== Current system ==
Level	League(s)/Division(s)	
1	V.League 1 (professional); 14 clubs ↓ 2 relegation spots	
2	V.League 2 (professional); 14 clubs ↑ 2 promotion spots ↓ 2 relegation spots	
3	Vietnamese Second Division (semi-pro); 14 clubs divided into 2 groups ↑ 2 promotion spots ↓ 2 relegation spots	
3	Group A 7 clubs	Group B 7 clubs
4	Vietnamese Third Division (semi-pro); 16 clubs divided into 2 groups ↑ 2 promotion spots	
4	Group A 8 clubs	Group B 8 clubs

== Cup eligibility ==
=== Domestic cups ===
All V.League 1 and V.League 2 sides qualify for the National Cup tournament.

=== Super Cup ===
The Super Cup is the first game of the season, played between the previous years' winners of the V.League 1 and National Cup. If the same team wins both competition, then the team finishing second in the previous years' V.League 1 take on the V.League 1 winners.

== Continental competition ==
For the 2025–26 season, one Vietnamese side, the team finishing top of V.League 1, qualifies automatically for the AFC Champions League Two and ASEAN Club Championship group stage, the runners-up qualify for the AFC Champions League Two group stage. The winner of the Vietnamese Cup qualify for the ASEAN Club Championship.

== See also ==
- V.League 1
- V.League 2
- Vietnamese Football League Second Division
- Vietnamese Football League Third Division
- Vietnamese Cup
- Vietnamese Super Cup
- List of football clubs in Vietnam
