= 2024–25 Vietnamese Cup =

2024–25 National Cup

Tournament details
- Country: Vietnam
- Dates: 19 October 2024 – 29 June 2025
- Teams: 25

Final positions
- Champions: Cong An Hanoi (1st title)
- Runners-up: Song Lam Nghe An
- AFC Champions League Two: Cong An Hanoi
- ASEAN Club Championship: Cong An Hanoi

Tournament statistics
- Matches played: 24
- Goals scored: 63 (2.63 per match)
- Attendance: 92,950 (3,873 per match)
- Top goal scorer(s): Alan Grafite (5 goals)

The 2024–25 Vietnamese National Football Cup was the 33rd edition of the Vietnamese National Football Cup, the premier knockout competition in Vietnamese football. A total of 25 clubs competed in this edition, including all teams from the top two tiers of the Vietnamese football league system. The competition began in October 2024 with the first-round matches, and was concluded on 29 June 2025 with the final.

V.League 1 team Dong A Thanh Hoa were the two-time defending champions after winning back-to-back titles in the 2023 and 2023–24 editions, but were eliminated by Haiphong on the round of 16.

Cong An Hanoi won the first title after defeating Song Lam Nghe An 5–0 in the final. As winners, Cong An Hanoi earned automatic qualification to the 2025–26 AFC Champions League Two group stage and 2025–26 ASEAN Championship group stage. Cong An Hanoi also qualified for the 2025 edition of the Vietnamese Super Cup at the start of the next season, where they faced the champions of the 2024–25 V.League 1, Thep Xanh Nam Dinh.

== Background ==
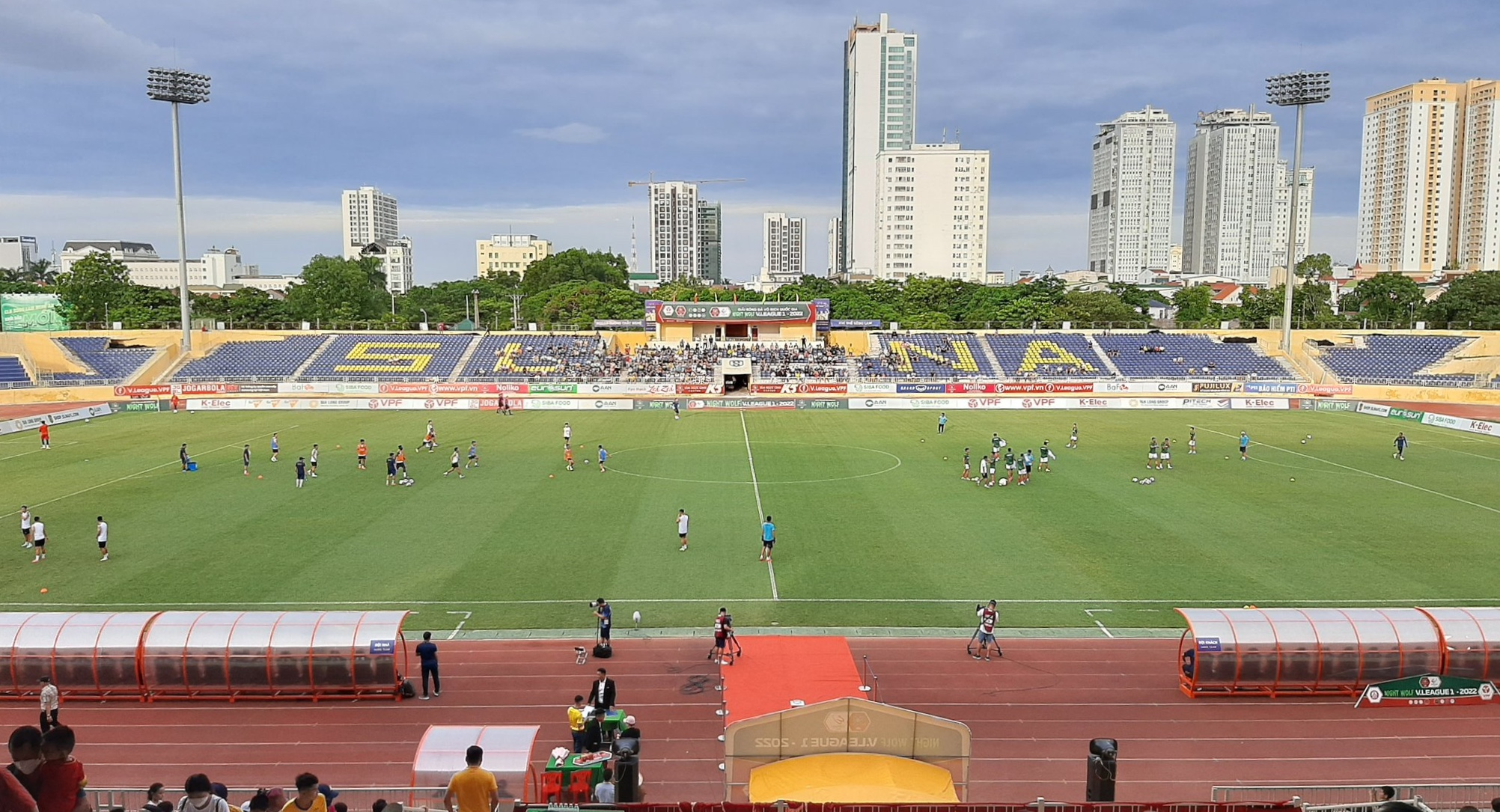
The Vinh Stadium in Nghệ An province hosted the final.

The tournament consists of 14 teams from V.League 1 and 11 teams from V.League 2 to compete.

Round	Main date	Number of fixtures	Clubs remaining	New entries this round
First round	19–20 October 2024	9	18 → 9	
Round of 16	10–14 January 2025	8	9+7 → 8	7 V.League 1 teams entered directly from the Round of 16 based on the draw results
Quarter-finals	29–30 March 2025	4	8 → 4	
Semi-finals	26 June 2025	2	4 → 2	
Final	29 June 2025	1	2 → 1	

== Matches ==
All times are local, ICT (UTC+7).

=== Qualifying round ===
Number of teams per tier still in competition
V.League 1	V.League 2	Total
14 / 14	11 / 11	25 / 25

19 October 2024	Dong Thap (2)	1–0	Dong Nai (2)	Cao Lãnh Stadium, Đồng Tháp
15:30	Trần Thành 34'	Report		Attendance: 2,000; Referee: Nguyễn Anh Vũ

19 October 2024	Ba Ria-Vung Tau (2)	1–0	Hue (2)	Bà Rịa Stadium, Bà Rịa-Vũng Tàu
16:00	Nguyễn Quốc Hoàng 59'	Report		Attendance: 800; Referee: Trần Văn Trọng

19 October 2024	Truong Tuoi Binh Phuoc (2)	1–0	Ho Chi Minh City Youth (2)	Bình Phước Stadium, Bình Phước
17:00	Nguyễn Công Phượng 5'	Report		Attendance: 5,000; Referee: Ngô Đắc Tiến

19 October 2024	Hoa Binh (2)	0–0 (10–11 p)	SHB Da Nang (1)	Hòa Bình Stadium, Hòa Bình
17:00		Report		Attendance: 1,000; Referee: Nguyễn Ngọc Tùng
	Penalties
	Nguyễn Thế Hùng (penalty scored); Lê Khánh Toàn (penalty scored); Tạ Việt Sơn (penalty scored); Nguyễn Trung Hiếu (penalty scored); Trần Gia Huy (penalty scored); Đinh Viết Lộc (penalty scored); Lê Văn Quý (penalty scored); Nguyễn Văn Dũng (penalty scored); Hoàng Tiến Dũng (penalty scored); Trịnh Hoàng Cảnh (penalty scored); Nguyễn Tiến Tạo (penalty missed)		(penalty scored) Đặng Anh Tuấn; (penalty scored) Phạm Đình Duy; (penalty scored) Nguyễn Trọng Nam; (penalty scored) Trần Vương; (penalty scored) Phan Văn Long; (penalty scored) Đoàn Anh Việt; (penalty scored) Nguyễn Hồng Sơn; (penalty scored) Phạm Văn Hữu; (penalty scored) Mai Quốc Tú; (penalty scored) Lê Văn Hưng; (penalty scored) Đặng Tuấn Hưng

20 October 2024	Long An (2)	1–4	Hong Linh Ha Tinh (1)	Long An Stadium, Long An
16:00	Trần Hữu Đăng 65'	Report	Viktor Le 12'; Nguyễn Văn Huy 45'; Nguyễn Trọng Hoàng 77'; Huỳnh Tấn Tài 90'	Attendance: 1,000; Referee: Trần Ngọc Nhớ

20 October 2024	Quang Nam (1)	2–4	Haiphong (1)	Hòa Xuân Stadium, Đà Nẵng
17:00	Hyuri 21'; Phù Trung Phong 60'	Report	Lê Mạnh Dũng 35'; Bicou Bissainthe 48'; Lucão do Break 80'; Zé Paulo 89'	Attendance: 350; Referee: Đỗ Khánh Nam

20 October 2024	Khatoco Khanh Hoa (2)	2–3	PVF-CAND (2)	19 August, Khánh Hòa
17:00	Hổ 79'; Nguyễn Thành Thụ 90+1' (pen.)	Report	Nguyễn Xuân Nam 71'; Thái Bá Đạt 77'; Huỳnh Công Đến 86'	Attendance: 2,000; Referee: Nguyễn Hữu Tuấn

20 October 2024	Quy Nhon Binh Dinh (1)	2–2 (3–4 p)	Becamex Binh Duong (1)	Quy Nhơn Stadium, Bình Định
18:00	Dương Thanh Tùng 89'; Vũ Minh Tuấn 90+3' (pen.)	Report	Nguyễn Tiến Linh 39'; Nguyễn Thành Nhân 59'	Attendance: 1,000; Referee: Khổng Tam Cường
	Penalties
	Vũ Minh Tuấn (penalty scored); Cao Văn Triền (penalty scored); Dương Văn Khoa (penalty missed); Trần Trọng Hiếu (penalty scored); Lục Xuân Hưng (penalty missed)		(penalty scored) Hà Đức Chinh; (penalty scored) Võ Minh Trọng; (penalty scored) Odilzhon Abdurakhmanov; (penalty missed) Trần Trung Hiếu; (penalty scored) Bùi Vĩ Hào

20 October 2024	Ho Chi Minh City FC (1)	0–0 (3–4 p)	Phu Dong Ninh Binh (2)	Thống Nhất Stadium, Ho Chi Minh City
19:15		Report		Attendance: 2,500; Referee: Đỗ Thành Đệ
	Penalties
	Trần Hoàng Phúc (penalty scored); Đào Quốc Gia (penalty scored); Đoàn Hải Quân (penalty missed); Bùi Ngọc Long (penalty scored); Trần Mạnh Cường (penalty missed)		(penalty scored) Nguyễn Đức Việt; (penalty missed) Đỗ Thanh Thịnh; (penalty scored) Lê Hải Đức; (penalty missed) Phạm Gia Hưng; (penalty scored) Mạch Ngọc Hà

=== Round of 16 ===
Number of teams per tier still in competition
V.League 1	V.League 2	Total
11 / 14	5 / 11	16 / 25

9 January 2025	Thep Xanh Nam Dinh (1)	1–1 (4–5 p)	Becamex Binh Duong (1)	Thiên Trường Stadium, Nam Định
18:00	Caio César 90+10' (pen.)	Report	Trần Trung Hiếu 66'	Attendance: 7,000; Referee: Nguyễn Ngọc Tùng
	Penalties
	Caio César (penalty scored); Tô Văn Vũ (penalty scored); Trần Nguyên Mạnh (penalty scored); Hoàng Minh Tuấn (penalty missed); Dương Thanh Hào (penalty scored); Joseph Mpande (penalty missed)		(penalty scored) Quế Ngọc Hải; (penalty scored) Nguyễn Tiến Linh; (penalty missed) Bùi Vĩ Hào; (penalty scored) Odilzhon Abdurakhmanov; (penalty scored) Nguyễn Trần Việt Cường; (penalty scored) Ngô Tùng Quốc

11 January 2025	Song Lam Nghe An (1)	1–0	SHB Da Nang (1)	Vinh Stadium, Nghệ An
18:00	Đinh Xuân Tiến 41'	Report		Attendance: 1,500; Referee: Ngô Đắc Tiến

11 January 2025	The Cong-Viettel (1)	2–0	PVF-CAND (2)	Mỹ Đình National Stadium, Hanoi
19:15	Nguyễn Đức Chiến 78' (pen.); Nhâm Mạnh Dũng 90+3'	Report		Attendance: 5,000; Referee: Vũ Phúc Hoan

12 January 2025	Ba Ria-Vung Tau (2)	1–1 (2–4 p)	Phu Dong Ninh Binh (2)	Bà Rịa Stadium, Bà Rịa-Vũng Tàu
16:00	Nguyễn Hoàng Chiến 74'	Report	Phạm Văn Thành 29'	Attendance: 2,500; Referee: Đỗ Thành Đệ
	Penalties
	Bùi Văn Bình (penalty scored); Nguyễn Quốc Hoàng (penalty scored); Lê Khả Đức (penalty missed); Trần Đình Bảo (penalty missed)		(penalty scored) Đinh Thanh Bình; (penalty scored) Lê Hải Đức; (penalty scored) Nguyễn Đức Cường; (penalty scored) Võ Anh Quân

12 January 2025	Hoang Anh Gia Lai (1)	1–1 (4–3 p)	Truong Tuoi Binh Phuoc (2)	Pleiku Stadium, Gia Lai
17:00	Dụng Quang Nho 21'	Report	Nguyễn Công Phượng 55'	Attendance: 4,000; Referee: Dương Hữu Phúc
	Penalties
	Châu Ngọc Quang (penalty missed); Cao Hoàng Minh (penalty scored); Phạm Lý Đức (penalty scored); Nguyễn Hữu Anh Tài (penalty scored); Trần Minh Vương (penalty scored)		(penalty scored) Nguyễn Công Phượng; (penalty scored) Cù Nguyễn Khánh; (penalty missed) Huỳnh Tấn Sinh; (penalty scored) Nguyễn Vũ Hoàng Dương; (penalty missed) Hồ Tuấn Tài

12 January 2025	Hanoi FC (1)	0–0 (3–4 p)	Dong Thap (2)	Hàng Đẫy Stadium, Hanoi
19:15		Report		Attendance: 1,000; Referee: Lê Đức Cảnh
	Penalties
	Đậu Văn Toàn (penalty scored); Lê Văn Xuân (penalty missed); Phạm Xuân Mạnh (penalty scored); Bùi Long Nhật (penalty missed); Nguyễn Văn Tùng (penalty scored)		(penalty scored) Trần Long Hải; (penalty missed) Nguyễn Đình Huyên; (penalty scored) Trần Hữu Thắng; (penalty scored) Nguyễn Văn Thái; (penalty scored) Nguyễn Tuấn Em

14 January 2025	Cong An Hanoi (1)	2–1	Hong Linh Ha Tinh (1)	Hàng Đẫy Stadium, Hanoi
19:15	Alan Grafite 37'; Bùi Hoàng Việt Anh 90+3'	Report	Geovane Magno 69'	Attendance: 5,000; Referee: Nguyễn Viết Duẩn

4 March 2025	Dong A Thanh Hoa (1)	0–1	Haiphong (1)	Thanh Hóa Stadium, Thanh Hóa
18:00		Report	Triệu Việt Hưng 43'	Attendance: 3,500; Referee: Dương Hữu Phúc

=== Quarter-finals ===
Number of teams per tier still in competition
V.League 1	V.League 2	Total
6 / 14	2 / 11	8 / 25

29 March 2025	Becamex Binh Duong (1)	2–2 (5–4 p)	Phu Dong Ninh Binh (2)	Gò Đậu Stadium, Bình Dương
18:00	Nguyễn Tiến Linh 69'; Võ Hoàng Minh Khoa 73'	Report	Lê Hải Đức 84'; Nguyễn Hoàng Đức 90+5' (pen.)	Attendance: 3,000; Referee: Nguyễn Văn Phúc
	Penalties
	Quế Ngọc Hải (penalty scored); Nguyễn Tiến Linh (penalty scored); Võ Minh Trọng (penalty scored); Ngô Tùng Quốc (penalty scored); Nguyễn Trần Việt Cường (penalty scored)		(penalty scored) Nguyễn Hoàng Đức; (penalty scored) Lê Minh Bình; (penalty missed) Lê Hải Đức; (penalty scored) Võ Anh Quân; (penalty scored) Mạch Ngọc Hà

30 March 2025	Song Lam Nghe An (1)	2–1	Dong Thap (2)	Vinh Stadium, Nghệ An
18:00	Bùi Ngọc Thịnh 71' (o.g.); Đinh Xuân Tiến 79'	Report	Trần Nhật Đông 81'	Attendance: 7,000; Referee: Nguyễn Ngọc Tùng

30 March 2025	The Cong-Viettel (1)	2–0	Hoang Anh Gia Lai (1)	Mỹ Đình National Stadium, Hanoi
19:15	Khuất Văn Khang 64'; Trần Danh Trung 90+7'	Report		Attendance: 3,000; Referee: Vũ Phúc Hoan

22 April 2025	Haiphong (1)	1–3	Cong An Hanoi (1)	Lạch Tray Stadium, Haiphong
19:15	Lucão 48'	Report	Phan Văn Đức 52'; Bùi Hoàng Việt Anh 78'; Hoàng Văn Toản 90+1'	Attendance: 10,000; Referee: Trương Hồng Vũ

=== Semi-finals ===
Number of teams per tier still in competition
V.League 1	V.League 2	Total
4 / 14	0 / 11	4 / 25

26 June 2025	Song Lam Nghe An (1)	3–2	Becamex Binh Duong (1)	Vinh Stadium, Nghệ An
18:00	Michael Olaha 17', 90+1' (pen.); Hồ Văn Cường 79'	Report	Trần Duy Khánh 38'; Janclesio 87'	Attendance: 7,000; Referee: Hoàng Ngọc Hà

26 June 2025	Cong An Hanoi (1)	3–1	The Cong-Viettel (1)	Hàng Đẫy Stadium, Hanoi
19:15	Hugo Gomes 13'; Nguyễn Quang Hải 19'; Alan Grafite 40'	Report	Nguyễn Hữu Thắng 37'	Attendance: 10,800; Referee: Nguyễn Viết Duẩn

=== Final ===
29 June 2025	Song Lam Nghe An (1)	0–5	Cong An Hanoi (1)	Vinh Stadium, Nghệ An
18:00		Report	Nguyễn Quang Vinh 6' (o.g.); Alan Grafite 38', 48', 62'; Léo Artur 42'	Attendance: 20,000; Referee: Usian Bin Jamal (Malaysia)

== Bracket ==
Qualifying round
20 October 2024; Hòa Xuân
Quang Nam (2)	2
Haiphong (3)	4
20 October 2024; Long An
Long An (5)	1
Hong Linh Ha Tinh (6)	4
20 October 2024; 19 August
Khatoco Khanh Hoa (8)	2
PVF-CAND (9)	3
19 October 2024; Bình Phước
Truong Tuoi Binh Phuoc (11)	1
Ho Chi Minh City Youth (12)	0
19 October 2024; Hòa Bình
Hoa Binh (14)	0 (10)
SHB Da Nang (p) (15)	0 (11)
19 October 2024; Cao Lãnh
Dong Thap (17)	1
Dong Nai (18)	0
20 October 2024; Quy Nhơn
Quy Nhon Binh Dinh (20)	2 (3)
Becamex Binh Duong (p) (21)	2 (4)
19 October 2024; Bà Rịa
Ba Ria-Vung Tau (22)	1
Hue (23)	0
20 October 2024; Thống Nhất
Ho Chi Minh City FC (24)	0 (3)
Phu Dong Ninh Binh (p) (25)	0 (4)

Round of 16
4 March 2025; Thanh Hóa
Dong A Thanh Hoa (1)	0
Haiphong (3)	1
14 January 2025; Hàng Đẫy
Cong An Hanoi (4)	2
Hong Linh Ha Tinh (6)	1
11 January 2025; Mỹ Đình
The Cong-Viettel (7)	2
PVF-CAND (9)	0
12 January 2025; Pleiku
Hoang Anh Gia Lai (p) (10)	1 (4)
Truong Tuoi Binh Phuoc (11)	1 (3)
11 January 2025; Vinh
Song Lam Nghe An (13)	1
SHB Da Nang (15)	0
12 January 2025; Hàng Đẫy
Hanoi FC (16)	0 (3)
Dong Thap (p) (17)	0 (4)
9 January 2025; Thiên Trường
Thep Xanh Nam Dinh (19)	1 (4)
Becamex Binh Duong (p) (21)	1 (5)
12 January 2025; Bà Rịa
Ba Ria-Vung Tau (22)	1 (2)
Phu Dong Ninh Binh (p) (25)	1 (4)

Quarter-finals
22 April 2025; Lạch Tray
Haiphong (3)	1
Cong An Hanoi (4)	3
29 March 2025; Mỹ Đình
The Cong-Viettel (7)	2
Hoang Anh Gia Lai (10)	0
30 March 2025; Vinh
Song Lam Nghe An (13)	2
Dong Thap (17)	1
30 March 2025; Gò Đậu
Becamex Binh Duong (p) (21)	2 (5)
Phu Dong Ninh Binh (25)	2 (4)

Semi-finals
26 June 2025; Hàng Đẫy
Cong An Hanoi (4)	3
The Cong-Viettel (7)	1
26 June 2025; Vinh
Song Lam Nghe An (13)	3
Becamex Binh Duong (21)	2

Final
29 June 2025; Vinh
Cong An Hanoi (4)	5
Song Lam Nghe An (13)	0
