= Tạ Thái Học =

Vietnamese footballer

Personal information
- Full name: Tạ Thái Học
- Date of birth: 17 July 1988 (age 38)
- Place of birth: Ninh Thuận, Vietnam
- Height: 1.80 m (5 ft 11 in)
- Position: Forward

Youth career
- 2003–2010: HAGL – Arsenal JMG Academy

Senior career*
Years	Team	Apps	(Gls)
2011–2017	Hoàng Anh Gia Lai	22	(1)
2012–2013	→ Hoang Anh Attapeu (loan)		
2018–2022	Bình Phước	32	(11)
- * Club domestic league appearances and goals as of 14 October 2017

Tạ Thái Học (born 17 July 1988) is a Vietnamese footballer who plays as a striker for Bình Phước in V.League 2.

== Career ==
Despite playing as a forward, Thái Học has thus far only scored a couple goals in his 6 years as a footballer. This is part due to various injuries he has had. Nonetheless coaches have referred to Thái Học as a hardworking and dedicated player.

In 2012, he was loaned to Hoàng Anh Gia Lai's partner club in Laos Hoang Anh Attapeu, where he remained for one season.

In July 2016, Thái Học suffered a serious injury to his right projected to keep him out for 8–12 months. This was the third such injury to happen to Thái Học in his career.

== Personal life ==
Thái Học is married to Đặng Thị Hoài Thanh, whom he wed in a private ceremony. After scoring a goal in a cup game against Viettel in 2016 Thái Học celebrated by tucking the ball under his shirt in homage to his pregnant wife.
