= Nguyễn Hữu Tuấn =

Vietnamese footballer

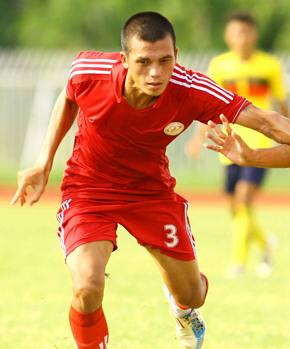
- Hữu Tuấn in 2013

Personal information
- Full name: Nguyễn Hữu Tuấn
- Date of birth: 6 May 1992 (age 34)
- Place of birth: Liên Chiểu, Đà Nẵng, Vietnam
- Height: 1.78 m (5 ft 10 in)
- Position: Centre-back

Team information
- Current team: Đồng Nai City
- Number: 15

Youth career
- 2004–2011: SHB Đà Nẵng

Senior career*
Years	Team	Apps	(Gls)
2012–2020	Hồ Chí Minh City	81	(2)
2021–2022	Hoàng Anh Gia Lai	27	(0)
2023–2024	Thép Xanh Nam Định	30	(0)
2024–2025	Phù Đổng Ninh Bình	19	(0)
2025–	Đồng Nai City	19	(0)
- * Club domestic league appearances and goals as of 6 June 2026

Nguyễn Hữu Tuấn (born 6 May 1992) is a Vietnamese professional footballer who plays as a centre-back for V.League 1 club Đồng Nai City.

== Honours ==
Hồ Chí Minh City

- V.League 2: 2016

Thép Xanh Nam Định

- V.League 1: 2023–24

Phù Đổng Ninh Bình

- V.League 2: 2024–25

Trường Tươi Đồng Nai

- V.League 2: 2025–26
