= 1987 V-League =

Vietnam National A1 League
- Season: 1987
- Dates: 1 March – 7 June
- Champions: Quân Đội (3rd title)
- Matches: 246
- Goals: 582 (2.37 per match)
- Top goalscorer: Lưu Tấn Liêm (15 goals)

The 1987 Vietnam National A1 League was the 7th season of the National Football Championship in Vietnam, played from 1 March until 7 June 1987.

== First phase ==
27 teams are divided over 3 groups playing a double round robin. The top 4 teams of each group advance to the second phase. Similar to the previous season, there won't be any relegated teams.

Similar to some Soviet Top League seasons, a draw limit was used. In this case, from the 5th draw on points would not be counted.

=== Group A ===
Pos	Team	Pld	W	D	L	GF	GA	GD	Pts	Qualification
1	Quân Đội	16	8	6	2	20	9	+11	20	Qualify for Second phase
2	Công Nhân Nghĩa Bình	16	6	7	3	19	13	+6	16	Qualify for Second phase
3	Công An TP.HCM	16	6	4	6	16	10	+6	16	Qualify for Second phase
4	Công An Hải Phòng	16	6	7	3	16	15	+1	16	Qualify for Second phase
5	CNXD Hà Nội	16	6	4	6	10	10	0	16	
6	Dệt Nam Định	16	5	8	3	19	17	+2	14	
7	Than Quảng Ninh	16	4	8	4	10	10	0	12	
8	Sông Lam Nghệ Tĩnh	16	4	3	9	11	21	−10	11	
9	Long An	16	0	7	9	10	26	−16	4	

Source: VFF

=== Group B ===
Pos	Team	Pld	W	D	L	GF	GA	GD	Pts	Qualification
1	Quảng Nam-Đà Nẵng	16	9	4	3	21	13	+8	22	Qualify for Second phase
2	Cảng Sài Gòn	16	8	6	2	25	14	+11	20	Qualify for Second phase
3	Lâm Đồng	16	7	7	2	30	20	+10	18	Qualify for Second phase
4	Công An Hà Nội	16	7	6	3	30	20	+10	18	Qualify for Second phase
5	Công Nghiệp Hà Nam Ninh	16	4	5	7	24	26	−2	12	
6	Tiền Giang	16	4	5	7	20	24	−4	12	
7	Công An Thanh Hóa	16	3	5	8	18	27	−9	10	
8	Điện Hải Phòng	16	2	8	6	8	18	−10	8	
9	Quân Khu 3	16	2	6	8	9	23	−14	8	

Source: VFF

=== Group C ===
Pos	Team	Pld	W	D	L	GF	GA	GD	Pts	Qualification
1	Hải Quan	16	11	2	3	33	16	+17	24	Qualify for Second phase
2	Sở Công Nghiệp TP.HCM	16	10	4	2	24	14	+10	24	Qualify for Second phase
3	An Giang	16	8	5	3	21	11	+10	20	Qualify for Second phase
4	Phú Khánh	16	7	5	4	18	11	+7	18	Qualify for Second phase
5	Quân Khu Thủ Đô	16	5	4	7	17	22	−5	14	
6	Công An Quảng Nam-Đà Nẵng	16	4	7	5	18	23	−5	12	
7	Cảng Hải Phòng	16	4	3	9	18	24	−6	11	
8	Tổng Cục Đường Sắt	16	3	4	9	11	17	−6	10	
9	Phòng Không	16	0	6	10	9	31	−22	4	

Source: VFF

== Second phase ==
The 12 qualified teams are divided over 3 groups playing a single round robin. The top 2 of each group and the two best 3rd place teams advance to the final round.

Matches that ended with a draw after 90 minutes would decide the winner team in the penalty-shootouts.

=== Group 1 ===
Pos	Team	Pld	W	L	GF	GA	GD	Pts	Qualification
1	Quân Đội	3	3	0	9	4	+5	6	Qualify for Final round
2	An Giang	3	2	1	7	6	+1	4	Qualify for Final round
3	Lâm Đồng	3	1	2	5	5	0	2	Qualify for Final round
4	Công An Hải Phòng	3	0	3	2	8	−6	0	

Source: VFF

=== Group 2 ===
Pos	Team	Pld	W	L	GF	GA	GD	Pts	Qualification
1	Cảng Sài Gòn	3	2	1	4	2	+2	4	Qualify for Final round
2	Phú Khánh	3	2	1	6	5	+1	4	Qualify for Final round
3	Công Nhân Nghĩa Bình	3	1	2	6	7	−1	2	
4	Công An Hà Nội	3	1	2	1	3	−2	2	

Source: VFF

=== Group 3 ===
Pos	Team	Pld	W	L	GF	GA	GD	Pts	Qualification
1	Sở Công Nghiệp TP.HCM	3	3	0	5	2	+3	6	Qualify for Final round
2	Hải Quan	3	2	1	5	4	+1	4	Qualify for Final round
3	Quảng Nam-Đà Nẵng	3	1	2	8	6	+2	2	Qualify for Final round
4	Công An TP.HCM	3	0	3	1	7	−6	0	

Source: VFF

== Final round ==
=== Quarter-finals ===
Quân Đội	1–1	Lâm Đồng
Penalties
	4–3

Cảng Sài Gòn	1–1	An Giang
Penalties
	2–4

Sở Công Nghiệp TP.HCM	2–3	Quảng Nam-Đà Nẵng

Phú Khánh	2–1	Hải Quan

=== Semi-finals ===
Quân Đội	2–1	Phú Khánh

An Giang	0–1	Quảng Nam-Đà Nẵng

=== Third place match ===
Phú Khánh	1–3	An Giang

=== Final ===
7 June 1987

Quân Đội	1–0	Quảng Nam-Đà Nẵng
Đặng Văn Dũng

Quy Nhơn Stadium, Nghĩa Bình
Attendance: 40,000
Referee: Đỗ Đình Hùng

Vietnam National A1 League
champions

3rd title
