= Đặng Anh Tuấn =

Vietnamese footballer (born 1994)

Personal information
- Full name: Đặng Anh Tuấn
- Date of birth: 1 August 1994 (age 32)
- Place of birth: Sơn Trà, Đà Nẵng, Vietnam
- Height: 1.75 m (5 ft 9 in)
- Position: Midfielder

Team information
- Current team: Becamex Hồ Chí Minh City
- Number: 18

Youth career
- 2006–2012: SHB Đà Nẵng

Senior career*
Years	Team	Apps	(Gls)
2013–2026	SHB Đà Nẵng	145	(11)
2026–	Becamex Hồ Chí Minh City	5	(0)

International career
2010	U16 Vietnam		
2012	U20 Vietnam		
- * Club domestic league appearances and goals as of 4 November 2026

Đặng Anh Tuấn (born 1 August 1994) is a Vietnamese professional footballer who plays as a midfielder for V.League 2 club Becamex Hồ Chí Minh City.

He is usually called Tuấn "Xavi" for his style of play and role in the midfield; however, he refuses that nickname, thinking the comparison is inaccurate.

== Club career ==
Tuấn was born in Sơn Trà district, Đà Nẵng, Việt Nam. His father was an engineer and his mother was a businesswoman. He was initially selected for the school, later district and city football team. At the age of 11, Tuấn was recruited by SHB Đà Nẵng for training. Tuấn's parents opposed his decision, wanting him to either become an engineer or a doctor, but later let him to pursue his football career. With the youth team, Tuấn won the 2010 Vietnamese National U-17 Football Championship and 2011 Vietnamese National U-17 Football Championship. He trained in the Đà Nẵng Academy alongside with Hồ Ngọc Thắng and Nguyễn Thái Sung.

In 2010 and 2012, Tuấn was called up for the U16 Vietnam and U20 Vietnam respectively. He was promoted to the first team of SHB Đà Nẵng in 2013. He did not get much chance to play at first. From 2015 to 2018, Tuấn suffered from various heel injuries. In the 2018 V.League 1, manager Nguyễn Minh Phương sold Ngô Quang Huy to Quảng Nam FC, which allowed Tuấn to play. However, due to Achilles tendon rupture, Tuấn travelled to Gia Lai to treat his injury, making no appearance until the last six rounds of the league, where his club ended up at the ninth place. The next season, Tuấn recovered, and his performance in the league was praised by Nam Định's manager Nguyễn Văn Dũng and Đà Nẵng's manager Lê Huỳnh Đức, who also recommended him to the Vietnam national team.

Tuấn left SHB Đà Nẵng in 2026, after 23 years at the club, and moved to V.League 2 club Becamex Hồ Chí Minh City.

== Personal life ==
Tuấn married a Đà Nẵng woman in 2017 and has one son born in 2018. His family lives at his parents' house.

== Honours ==
SHB Đà Nẵng

- Vietnamese Super Cup: 2012
- Vietnamese National Cup runner-up: 2013
- V.League 2: 2023–24

Individual

- V.League 2 Player of the Year: 2023–24
