= Nguyễn Thành Khải =

Vietnamese footballer

Personal information
- Full name: Nguyễn Thành Khải
- Date of birth: 28 October 2002 (age 24)
- Place of birth: Quế Sơn, Quảng Nam, Vietnam
- Height: 1.87 m (6 ft 2 in)
- Position: Centre back

Team information
- Current team: Đồng Tháp (on loan from SHB Đà Nẵng)
- Number: 3

Youth career
- –2023: SHB Đà Nẵng

Senior career*
Years	Team	Apps	(Gls)
2024–	SHB Đà Nẵng	2	(0)
2025–	→ Đồng Tháp (loan)	4	(0)

International career^{‡}
2024	Vietnam U23	1	(0)
- * Club domestic league appearances and goals as of 13 April 2025 ‡ National team caps and goals as of 10 April 2024

Nguyễn Thành Khải (born 28 October 2002) is a Vietnamese professional footballer who plays as a centre back for V.League 2 club Đồng Tháp, on loan from SHB Đà Nẵng.

== Club career ==
Born in Quảng Nam, Thành Khải was a youth member of the SHB Đà Nẵng. In 2023, he captained SHB Đà Nẵng's reserves side in the Vietnamese Second Division, helping the club finish second of their group in regular season as they advance to the promotion play-off. There, Thành Khải and his teammates lost to Đồng Tháp on penalty shootout after a goalless draw in regular time.

In the second part of the 2023–24 V.League, Thành Khải was promoted to the first team of SHB Đà Nẵng. On 13 March 2024, he made his professional in a 1–0 Vietnamese Cup win against Sông Lam Nghệ An.

== International career ==
In April 2024, Thành Khải was named in Vietnam U23 preliminary squad for the 2024 AFC U-23 Asian Cup.

== Honours ==
SHB Đà Nẵng

- V.League 2: 2023–24
