= Hồ Thanh Minh =

Vietnamese footballer (born 2000)

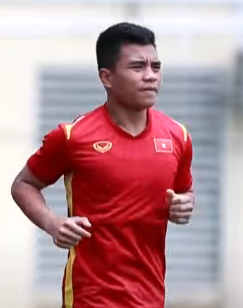
- Hồ Thanh Minh in 2022

Personal information
- Full name: Hồ Thanh Minh
- Date of birth: 7 February 2000 (age 26)
- Place of birth: A Lưới, Thừa Thiên Huế, Vietnam
- Height: 1.73 m (5 ft 8 in)
- Position: Forward

Team information
- Current team: Hà Nội
- Number: 17

Youth career
- 2018–2021: Huế

Senior career*
Years	Team	Apps	(Gls)
2021–2024	Huế	79	(25)
2024–	Hà Nội	1	(0)
2025	→ PVF-CAND (loan)	13	(5)
2025–2026	→ Trường Tươi Đồng Nai (loan)	16	(4)

International career^{‡}
2021–2022	Vietnam U23	8	(2)
Medal record
Men's football
Representing Vietnam
SEA Games
Gold medal – first place	Hanoi 2021	Team
- * Club domestic league appearances and goals as of 31 May 2026 ‡ National team caps and goals as of 26 March 2022

Hồ Thanh Minh (born 7 February 2000) is a Vietnamese professional footballer who plays as a forward for V.League 1 club Hà Nội.

== Club career ==
=== Huế ===
Thanh Minh was involved in athletics before becoming a footballer.

Two years after his debut in the U-17 youth team of Huế FC, Thanh Minh was promoted to the first team by coach Nguyễn Đức Dũng. However, he spent most of his first season as a backup to fellow 20-year-old teammate, Trần Danh Trung. After Trung left Huế, the 20-year-old Thanh Minh became the main striker of the team. In the 2023–24 V.League 2 season, he scored 10 goals and finished second on the league's top scorer list. As a result, he was named in the league's Team of the Season.

=== Hà Nội ===
On 29 July 2024, Thanh Minh signed for V.League 1 side Hà Nội.

On 20 January 2025, Thanh Minh was loaned to PVF-CAND until the end of the 2024-25 season.

In July 2025, Thanh remained in the V.League 2, joining Trường Tươi Đồng Nai on loan.

== International career ==
Thanh Minh participated at the 2022 AFC U-23 Asian Cup qualification, scoring the winning goal against Myanmar. He was part of the Vietnam team that won the gold medal in the 2021 SEA Games.

== Personal life ==
Thanh Minh comes from a farming family belonging to the Tà Ôi ethnic group in A Lưới, Thừa Thiên Huế.

== Career statistics ==
=== International goals ===
==== Vietnam U-23 ====
#	Date	Venue	Opponent	Score	Result	Competition
1.	2 November 2021	Bishkek, Kyrgyzstan	Myanmar	1–0	1–0	2022 AFC U-23 Asian Cup qualification
2.	15 May 2022	Phú Thọ, Vietnam	Timor-Leste	2–0	2–0	2021 SEA Games

== Honours ==
Trường Tươi Đồng Nai

- V.League 2: 2025–26

Vietnam U23

- SEA Games Gold medal: 2021

Individual

- V.League 2 Team of the season: 2023–24
