= Mai Quốc Tú =

Vietnamese footballer (born 2005)

Personal information
- Full name: Mai Quốc Tú
- Date of birth: 10 July 2005 (age 21)
- Place of birth: Đà Nẵng, Vietnam
- Height: 1.78 m (5 ft 10 in)
- Position: Left back

Team information
- Current team: Đồng Tháp (on loan from SHB Đà Nẵng)
- Number: 28

Youth career
- 2020–2023: SHB Đà Nẵng

Senior career*
Years	Team	Apps	(Gls)
2023	SHB Đà Nẵng B		
2023–	SHB Đà Nẵng	2	(0)
2026–	→ Đồng Tháp (loan)	14	(1)

International career^{‡}
2023–2024	Vietnam U20	4	(0)
2026–	Vietnam U23	1	(0)
- * Club domestic league appearances and goals as of 6 June 2026 ‡ National team caps and goals as of 28 March 2026

Mai Quốc Tú (born 10 July 2005) is a Vietnamese professional footballer who plays as a left back for V.League 2 club Đồng Tháp, on loan from SHB Đà Nẵng.

== Early career ==
Born in Đà Nẵng, Quốc Tú was a youth product of SHB Đà Nẵng, the biggest football club in his city. He captained several SHB Đà Nẵng's youth teams. In the 2023 Vietnamese National U-19 Championship, he received a five-match ban after kicking an opponent's head during a match against Tây Ninh.

== Club career ==
Quốc Tú started his senior career in 2023, playing for SHB Đà Nẵng reserve team in the Vietnamese Second Division, the third tier of Vietnamese football. Following SHB Đà Nẵng's relegation to the 2023–24 V.League 2, he was promoted to the first team. On 31 October 2023, he made his professional debut, coming in as a substitute in his team's a 2–2 draw against Trường Tươi Bình Phước.

== International career ==
In March 2022, Quốc Tú featured in Vietnam U17's training camp in Germany, where they played friendlies against youth teams of German professional clubs.

In 2023, Quốc Tú was selected to the Vietnam under-20 squad for the 2023 AFC U-20 Championship but didn't make any appearance during the tournament.

== Honours ==
SHB Đà Nẵng

- V.League 2: 2023–24
