= 2015 V.League 2 =

V.League 2
- Season: 2015
- Champions: Hà Nội
- Relegated: Công An Nhân Dân
- Matches played: 56
- Goals scored: 132 (2.36 per match)
- Top goalscorer: Trịnh Duy Long (8 goals)
- Biggest home win: TP Hồ Chí Minh 4-0 Phú Yên
- Biggest away win: Bình Phước 0-4 Phú Yên
- Highest scoring: Công An Nhân Dân 4-2 Bình Phước (6 goals)
- Highest attendance: 7000
- Lowest attendance: 300
- Average attendance: 1,814
- All statistics correct as of 29 August 2015.

The 2015 V.League 2 (referred to as Kienlongbank V.League 2 for sponsorship reasons) was the 21st season of V.League 2, Vietnam's second tier professional football league, which began on 11 April 2015 and finished on 29 August 2015.

== Changes from last season ==
=== Team changes ===
The following teams had changed division since the 2014 season.

==== To V.League 2 ====
Promoted from Vietnamese Second Division

- Nam Định
- Phú Yên
- Bình Phước
- Công An Nhân Dân

Relegated from V.League 1

- Hùng Vương An Giang (dissolved)

==== From V.League 2 ====
Relegated to Vietnamese Second Division

- Xi Măng Fico Tây Ninh

Promoted to V.League

- Đồng Tháp
- Sanna Khánh Hòa
- XSKT Cần Thơ

== Teams, stadiums and locations ==
Locations of the 2015 V.League 2 teams

Team	Location	Stadium	Capacity
Bình Phước	Đồng Xoài	Bình Phước Stadium	10,000
Công An Nhân Dân	Hà Nội	Hàng Đẫy Stadium	22,500
Hà Nội	Hà Nội	Hàng Đẫy Stadium	22,500
Huế F.C.	Huế	Tự Do Stadium	25,000
Nam Định	Nam Định	Thiên Trường Stadium	20,000
Phú Yên	Tuy Hòa	Phú Yên Stadium	5,000
TP Hồ Chí Minh	Ho Chi Minh City	Thống Nhất Stadium	25,000
Đắk Lắk	Buôn Ma Thuột	Buôn Ma Thuột Stadium	25,000

== Result ==
=== League table ===
Pos	Team	Pld	W	D	L	GF	GA	GD	Pts	Promotion or relegation
1	Hà Nội (C, P)	14	8	4	2	22	10	+12	28	Promotion to 2016 V.League 1
2	Huế F.C.	14	7	3	4	16	10	+6	24	
3	TP Hồ Chí Minh	14	7	3	4	19	13	+6	24	
4	Nam Định	14	5	3	6	13	18	−5	18	
5	Đắk Lắk	14	4	4	6	13	19	−6	16	
6	Phú Yên	14	3	6	5	16	19	−3	15	
7	Bình Phước	14	4	3	7	19	25	−6	15	
8	Công An Nhân Dân (R)	14	3	4	7	14	18	−4	13	Relegation to 2016 Vietnamese Second Division

Source: VPF
Rules for classification: 1) Points; 2) Goal difference; 3) Number of goals scored
(C) Champions; (P) Promoted; (R) Relegated

=== Positions by round ===
Team ╲ Round	1	2	3	4	5	6	7	8	9	10	11	12	13	14
Bình Phước	5	6	7	4	3	2	4	5	5	4	4	4	6	7
Công An Nhân Dân	6	7	6	7	7	7	6	6	6	6	6	6	7	8
Đắk Lắk	7	8	8	8	8	8	8	8	8	7	7	7	8	5
Hà Nội	3	3	4	6	4	3	2	1	1	1	1	1	1	1
Huế F.C.	1	1	1	1	1	1	1	3	3	3	3	3	2	2
Nam Định	2	4	3	5	6	6	7	7	7	8	8	5	4	4
Phú Yên	4	2	2	3	5	5	5	4	4	5	5	8	5	6
TP Hồ Chí Minh	8	5	5	2	2	4	3	2	2	2	2	2	3	3

Winner; Promoted to V.League 1
Relegate to Second League

Source: Vietnam Professional Football

=== Result table ===
Home \ Away	BP	CAND	HFC	HN	NĐ	PY	HCM	ĐL
Bình Phước		3–0	1–0	1–1	3–1	0–4	1–2	2–2
Công An Nhân Dân	4–2		0–1	1–0	3–1	0–1	0–1	0–0
Huế F.C.	2–1	0–0		1–0	3–1	1–1	3–0	2–1
Hà Nội	3–0	3–2	1–1		0–0	4–0	1–0	1–0
Nam Định	2–1	2–1	1–0	0–2		1–1	1–0	0–1
Phú Yên	0–0	2–2	0–1	2–3	0–1		1–1	1–1
TP Hồ Chí Minh	3–1	1–1	2–1	0–0	2–1	4–0		3–0
Đắk Lắk	1–3	1–0	1–0	2–3	1–1	0–3	2–0	

Source: Vietnam Professional Football
Legend: Blue = home team win; Yellow = draw; Red = away team win.

== Top scorers ==
As of matches played on 29 August 2015.

Rank	Player	Club	Goals
1	(Vietnam) Trịnh Duy Long	Hà Nội	8
2	(Vietnam) Nguyễn Như Tuấn	Công an Nhân dân	5
2	(Vietnam) Võ Lý	Huế FC	5
4	(Vietnam) Lê Kim Hậu	Bình Phước	4
4	(Vietnam) Nguyễn Hữu Sơn	Công An Nhân Dân	4
4	(Vietnam) Nguyễn Quang Hải	Hà Nội	4
4	(Vietnam) Phạm Thanh Tấn	Phú Yên	4
4	(Vietnam) Nguyễn Tuấn Anh	Hồ Chí Minh City	4
