= Trần Vũ (footballer) =

Vietnamese footballer (born 1955)

Personal information
- Date of birth: 18 April 1955 (age 71)
- Place of birth: Da Nang, Vietnam
- Position: Striker

Senior career*
Years	Team	Apps	(Gls)
1976–1988	SHB Da Nang		
- * Club domestic league appearances and goals

Trần Vũ (born 18 April 1955) is a Vietnamese former football manager and footballer.

== Early life ==
Vũ was born in 1955 in Da Nang, Vietnam. He was a student at the University of Technology but gave up his studies to follow his football career.

== Playing career ==
Vũ began his football career with Vietnamese side SHB Da Nang in 1976 at the age of 21. He and his team won the 1976 Trường Sơn tournament (a tournament for South Central football clubs), he was awarded the top goalscorer.

== Managerial career ==
In 1992, Trần Vũ signed for the SHB Da Nang as a coach. Right in his first season, he led the team to win their first V.League and a National Cup in the following season.

== Style of play ==
He mainly operated as a striker.
