= Nguyễn Thái Sung =

Vietnamese footballer

Personal information
- Full name: Nguyễn Thái Sung
- Date of birth: 22 September 1994 (age 32)
- Place of birth: Đà Nẵng, Vietnam
- Height: 1.70 m (5 ft 7 in)
- Position: Attacking midfielder

Youth career
- 2007–2009: SHB Đà Nẵng
- 2009–2012: Aspire Academy

Senior career*
Years	Team	Apps	(Gls)
2012–2018	SHB Đà Nẵng	18	(0)
2015	→ Sài Gòn (loan)	13	(2)
2016	→ Kon Tum (loan)	11	(0)
2018–2021	Long An	37	(9)
Total		79	(11)

International career
2015–2016	Vietnam U23	5	(0)
- * Club domestic league appearances and goals

Nguyễn Thái Sung (born 22 September 1994) is a Vietnamese former footballer who played as an attacking midfielder. Once regarded as a promising talent in Vietnamese football, Thái Sung's youth career had been unsuccessful due to contract disputes with his club.

== Personal life ==
Nguyễn Thái Sung was born on 22 September 1994. He was the youngest of three children on Trường Chinh Street in Da Nang to a rather poor family. His father is a retired North Vietnamese soldier who fought in the war while his mother is a street vendor who sells breakfast snacks.

== Club career ==
As Thái Sung's family was too poor to afford gas money to drive him to practice, Thái Sung was forced to play football in unconventional settings. However after he was scouted he became the first Vietnamese player to receive a scholarship from abroad, being sponsored by the Qatar Aspire Institute from 2009-2012. Thái Sung took part in the 2012 youth games where he was named in the top 10 players. After returning to Vietnam in 2012 Thái Sung signed with local club SHB Đà Nẵng.

Life at Da Nang however was far from easy as Thái Sung was not favored by coaches because of his short stature and unconventional playing style, limiting his opportunities. Thái Sung was later offered an opportunity to train with Sporting CP's youth academy in 2014 but Da Nang blocked the move. Thái Sung was also called up for the Vietnam under-21 side in 2015 but despite being praised by the coach was rarely played as his style did not suite the team. In 2014 Thái Sung wasn't even allowed to play, rather he was utilized to carry water for the SHB Da Nang u-23 side. In late 2015 Thái Sung finally got playing time when he was loaned out to Ha Noi FC in the second division, helping the team reach promotion. The next season Thái Sung was loaned out the same team again who had now moved to Ho Chi Minh City, but despite that Thái Sung only played three matches in 2016.

Bui Xuan Hoa, the chair of SHB Da Nang said in an interview that he thought that Thái Sung's stalled career was due to his talent being coached out of him by the Aspire Institute, who he said cannot even compare to a middle school football team in Vietnam.

On 1 December 2021, Nguyễn Thái Sung decided to retire as a footballer at the age of 27.
