= Nguyễn Thanh Thảo =

Vietnamese footballer

Personal information
- Full name: Nguyễn Thanh Thảo
- Date of birth: 13 May 1995 (age 31)
- Place of birth: Châu Đốc, An Giang, Vietnam
- Height: 1.78 m (5 ft 10 in)
- Position: Center-back

Team information
- Current team: Đồng Nai City
- Number: 13

Youth career
- 2010–2016: Becamex Bình Dương

Senior career*
Years	Team	Apps	(Gls)
2017–2023	Becamex Bình Dương	85	(5)
2023–2025	Hồ Chí Minh City	38	(3)
2025–	Đồng Nai City	3	(0)
- * Club domestic league appearances and goals as of 30 May 2026

Nguyễn Thanh Thảo (born 13 May 1995) is a Vietnamese professional footballer who plays as a center-back for V.League 1 club Đồng Nai City.

== Career ==
=== Becamex Bình Dương ===
After being promoted to Becamex Bình Dương's first team in 2017, he made his league debut on 19 November 2017 in a 4–0 victory over Long An.

== Honours ==
Becamex Bình Dương

- Vietnamese National Cup: 2018, runners-up: 2017
- Vietnamese Super Cup runners-up" 2019

Trường Tươi Đồng Nai

- V.League 2: 2025–26
