= Phạm Đình Duy =

Vietnamese footballer

Personal information
- Full name: Phạm Đình Duy
- Date of birth: 2 April 2002 (age 24)
- Place of birth: Hòa Vang, Đà Nẵng, Vietnam
- Height: 1.74 m (5 ft 9 in)
- Position: Winger

Team information
- Current team: SHB Đà Nẵng
- Number: 18

Youth career
- 2012–2022: SHB Đà Nẵng

Senior career*
Years	Team	Apps	(Gls)
2022–	SHB Đà Nẵng	92	(11)

International career^{‡}
2023	Vietnam U23	3	(0)
2022	Vietnam	1	(0)
Medal record
Men's football
Representing Vietnam
AFF U-23 Championship
Winner	Thailand 2023
- * Club domestic league appearances and goals as of 7 June 2026 ‡ National team caps and goals as of 26 August 2023

Phạm Đình Duy (born 2 April 2002) is a Vietnamese professional footballer who plays as a winger for V.League 1 club SHB Đà Nẵng.

== Club career ==
Phạm Đình Duy was promoted by SHB Đà Nẵng's manager Phan Thanh Hùng to first team for the 2022 season. He made his debut on the team's first league match of the season against Sài Gòn, entering on the 56th minute. He scored his first professional goal on 3 July. It was the first goal in a 2–1 victory against Hanoi FC in the V.League 1.

== International career ==
On 21 September 2022, Đình Duy made his debut for Vietnam national football team in the 4–0 win against Singapore, replacing Phạm Tuấn Hải in the start of the second half.

== Career statistics ==
=== Club ===
As of match played 27 June 2025

Appearances and goals by club, season and competition
Club	Season	League			Cup		Other		Total	
Club	Season	Division	Apps	Goals	Apps	Goals	Apps	Goals	Apps	Goals
SHB Da Nang	2022	V.League 1	18	4	1	0	—		19	4
SHB Da Nang	2023	V.League 1	17	0	1	0	—		18	0
SHB Da Nang	2023–24	V.League 2	10	3	1	0	—		11	3
SHB Da Nang	2024–25	V.League 1	24	2	2	0	1 (Note: Appearance in V.League promotion/relegation playoff)	1	27	3
Career total			69	9	5	0	1	1	75	10

=== International ===
As of match played 24 September 2022

Appearances and goals by national team and year
National team	Year	Apps	Goals
Vietnam
Vietnam	2022	1	0
Total		1	0

== Honours ==
SHB Đà Nẵng

- V.League 2: 2023–24

Vietnam

- VFF Cup: 2022

Vietnam U23

- AFF U-23 Championship: 2023
