= 2017 M-150 Cup =

Tournament details
- Host country: Thailand
- Dates: 9–15 December
- Teams: 6 (from 1 confederation)
- Venue(s): 1 (in 1 host city)

Final positions
- Champions: Uzbekistan (1st title)
- Runners-up: Japan
- Third place: Vietnam
- Fourth place: Thailand

Tournament statistics
- Matches played: 8
- Goals scored: 26 (3.25 per match)
- Top scorer(s): (Uzbekistan) Zabikhillo Urinboev (Vietnam) Nguyễn Công Phượng (4 goals each)
- Best player(s): (Uzbekistan) Javokhir Sidikov

The 2017 M-150 Cup is the tournament for under-23 national teams, held from 9–15 December at Buriram, Buriram Province, Thailand. The tournament is sponsored by M-150. The winning club will receive the cup and 20.000 USD.

== Venue ==
All matches held at the New I-Mobile Stadium in Buriram Province, Thailand.

Buriram
New I-Mobile Stadium
Capacity: 32,600
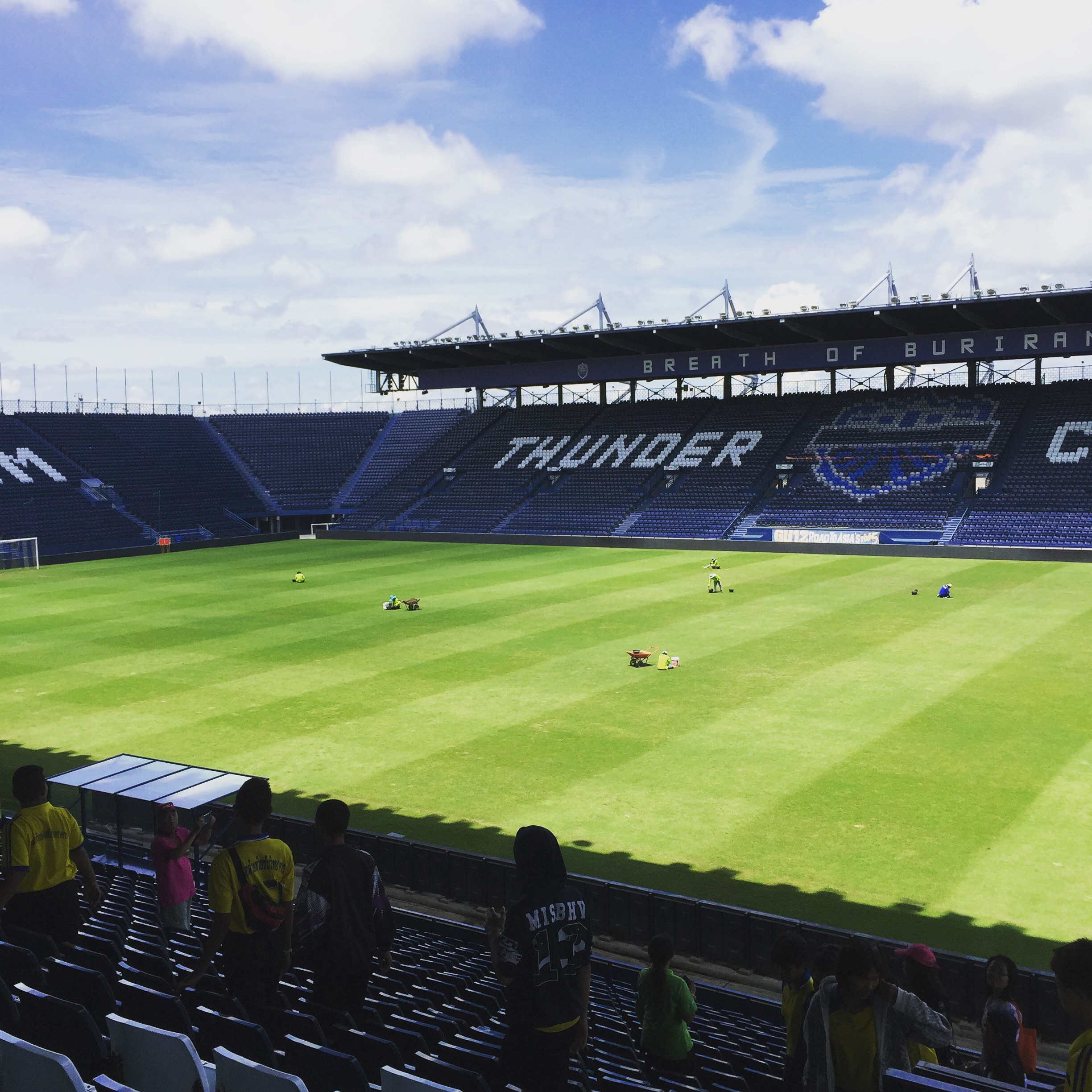

== Matches ==
All times are local, Indochina Time (UTC+7)

=== Group A ===
Pos	Team	Pld	W	D	L	GF	GA	GD	Pts	Qualification
1	Japan	2	1	0	1	5	2	+3	3	Final
2	Thailand	2	1	0	1	2	2	0	3	Third place play-off
3	North Korea	2	1	0	1	1	4	−3	3	

Updated to match(es) played on unknown. Source:
9 December 2017
20:00 UTC+07:00

Thailand	2–1	Japan
Saringkan 49'; Chaiyawat 64'	Report	Kamiya 52'

New I-Mobile Stadium, Buriram
Referee: Ahmad A'Qashah (Singapore)

11 December 2017
16:00 UTC+07:00

Japan	4–0	North Korea
Naganuma 5'; Ueda 15', 56'; Inoue 37'	Report

New I-Mobile Stadium, Buriram
Referee: Sivakorn Pu-udom (Thailand)

13 December 2017
20:00 UTC+07:00

North Korea	1–0	Thailand
Ri Hun 80'	Report

New I-Mobile Stadium, Buriram
Referee: Ahmad A'Qashah (Singapore)

=== Group B ===
Pos	Team	Pld	W	D	L	GF	GA	GD	Pts	Qualification
1	Uzbekistan	2	1	1	0	4	3	+1	4	Final
2	Vietnam	2	1	0	1	5	2	+3	3	Third place play-off
3	Myanmar	2	0	1	1	2	6	−4	1	

Updated to match(es) played on unknown. Source:
9 December 2017
16:00 UTC+07:00

Vietnam	4–0	Myanmar
Nguyễn Quang Hải 11', 20'; Phan Văn Long 64'; Nguyễn Công Phượng 69'	Report

New I-Mobile Stadium, Buriram
Referee: Mongkolchai Pechsri (Thailand)

11 December 2017
20:00 UTC+07:00

Myanmar	2–2	Uzbekistan
Sithu Aung 17'; Lwin Moe Aung 75'	Report	Abdixolikov 88'; Urinboev 90+4' (pen.)

New I-Mobile Stadium, Buriram
Referee: Teetichai Nualjan (Thailand)

13 December 2017
16:00 UTC+07:00

Uzbekistan	2–1	Vietnam
Abdixolikov 31'; Urinboev 66'	Report	Nguyễn Công Phượng 59' (pen.)

New I-Mobile Stadium, Buriram
Referee: Sivakorn Pu-udom (Thailand)

=== Third place play-off ===
15 December 2017
16:00 UTC+07:00

Thailand	1–2	Vietnam
Supachok 47'	Report	Nguyễn Công Phượng 7', 22'

New I-Mobile Stadium, Buriram
Referee: Ahmad A'Qashah (Singapore)

=== Final ===
15 December 2017
20:00 UTC+07:00

Japan	2–2	Uzbekistan
Kamiya 42'; Komatsu 88'	Report	Urinboev 42', 75'
Penalties
Kamiya (penalty scored); Komatsu (penalty scored); Matsumoto (penalty scored); Suga (penalty missed); Ueda (penalty missed)	3–4	(penalty scored) Khamdamov; (penalty scored) Sidikov; (penalty scored) Hamrobekov; (penalty scored) Ganiev

New I-Mobile Stadium, Buriram
Referee: Mongkolchai Pechsri (Thailand)

== Winner ==
2017 M-150 Cup

Uzbekistan
1st title

== Goalscorers ==
4 goals

- (Uzbekistan) Zabikhillo Urinboev
- (Vietnam) Nguyễn Công Phượng

2 goals

- (Japan) Ayase Ueda
- (Japan) Yuta Kamiya
- (Uzbekistan) Bobir Abdixolikov
- (Vietnam) Nguyễn Quang Hải

1 goal

- (Japan) Ren Komatsu
- (Japan) Shion Inoue
- (Japan) Yoichi Naganuma
- (Myanmar) Lwin Moe Aung
- (Myanmar) Sithu Aung
- (North Korea) Ri Hun
- (Thailand) Chaiyawat Buran
- (Thailand) Saringkan Promsupa
- (Thailand) Supachok Sarachat
- (Vietnam) Phan Văn Long
