= Nguyễn Công Nhật =

Vietnamese footballer (born 2000)

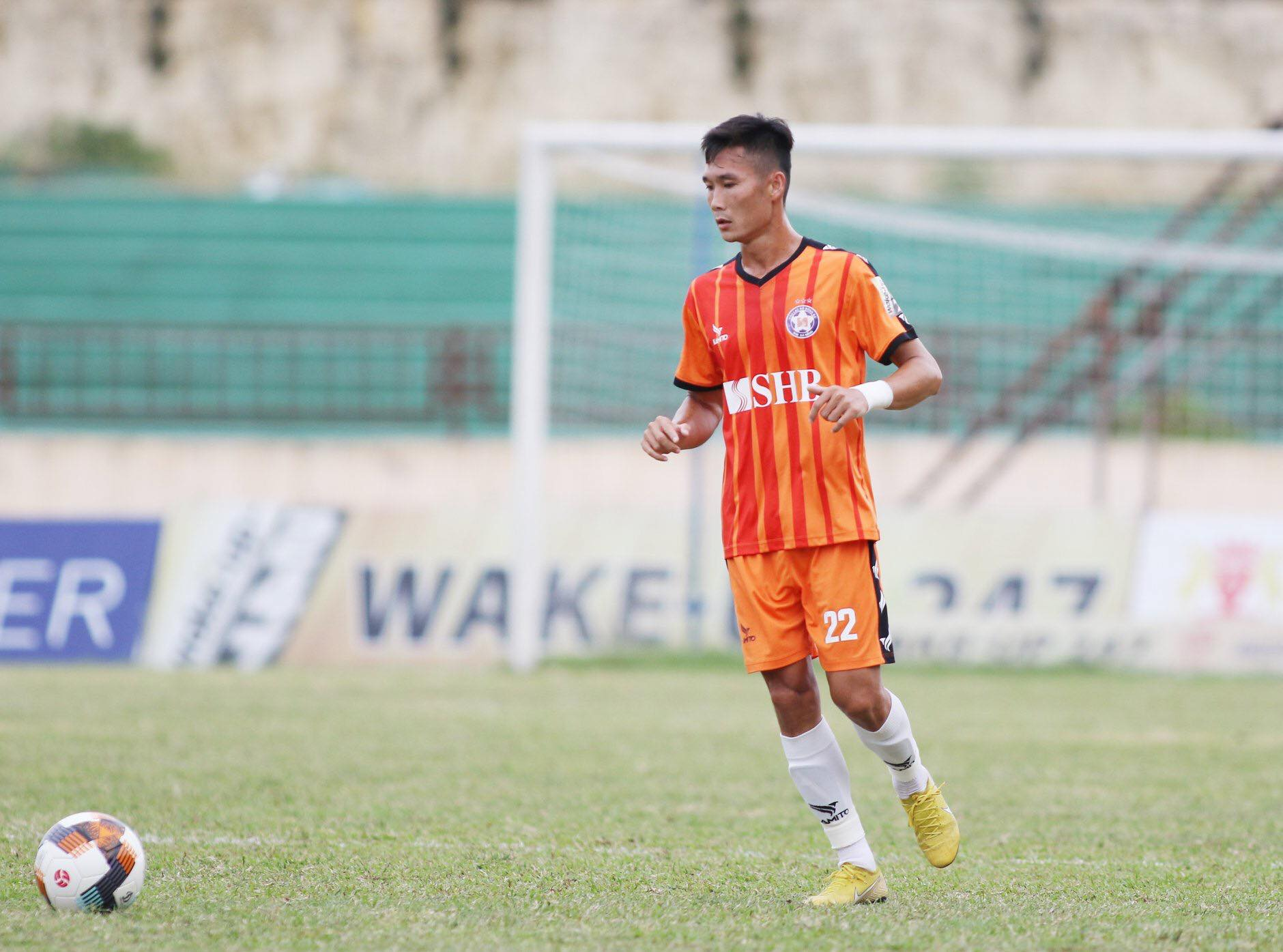
- Công Nhật in 2019

Personal information
- Full name: Nguyễn Công Nhật
- Date of birth: 12 May 1993 (age 33)
- Place of birth: Thừa Thiên-Huế, Vietnam
- Height: 1.73 m (5 ft 8 in)
- Position: Left-back

Team information
- Current team: Hà Nội (on loan from SHB Đà Nẵng)
- Number: 22

Youth career
- 2003–2014: Huế
- 2014: → Sông Lam Nghệ An (youth loan)

Senior career*
Years	Team	Apps	(Gls)
2014–2018	Huế		
2019–	SHB Đà Nẵng	124	(2)
2025–	→ Hà Nội (loan)	20	(0)
- * Club domestic league appearances and goals as of 7 June 2026

Nguyễn Công Nhật (born 12 May 1993) is a Vietnamese professional footballer who plays as a left-back for V.League 1 club Hà Nội, on loan from SHB Đà Nẵng.

== Career ==
Born in Thừa Thiên-Huế, Công Nhật was a product of his province's football team Huế. He played for Huê's senior team during five seasons. In the 2014 season, he was named as the best player of the team in the season. Công Nhật captained the team in the 2018 season and was again given the best player of the team in the season award.

After his contract with Huế expired, Công Nhật signed for SHB Đà Nẵng in February 2019. He helped SHB Đà Nẵng win the 2023–24 V.League 2 and was named in the league's Team of the season.

In July 2025, Công Nhật joined V.League 1 fellow Hà Nội in a one-season loan deal.

== Honours ==
SHB Đà Nẵng

- V.League 2: 2023–24

Individual

- V.League 2 Team of the Season: 2023–24
