= Phạm Văn Phong =

Vietnamese footballer

Personal information
- Full name: Phạm Văn Phong
- Date of birth: 3 June 1993 (age 33)
- Place of birth: Đông Hưng, Thái Bình, Vietnam
- Height: 1.80 m (5 ft 11 in)
- Position: Goalkeeper

Team information
- Current team: Đồng Nai City
- Number: 17

Youth career
- 2008–2012: Hòa Phát Hà Nội

Senior career*
Years	Team	Apps	(Gls)
2012	Hà Nội ACB	0	(0)
2013–2016	Đồng Nai	17	(0)
2016–2022	Sài Gòn	76	(0)
2023–2026	Thể Công–Viettel	54	(0)
2026–	Đồng Nai City	2	(0)

International career^{‡}
2012–2013	Vietnam U19	1	(0)
2014–2016	Vietnam U23	2	(0)
- * Club domestic league appearances and goals as of 13 September 2026 ‡ National team caps and goals as of 20 June 2016

Phạm Văn Phong (born 3 June 1993) is a Vietnamese professional footballer who plays as a goalkeeper for V.League 1 club Đồng Nai City.

== Early career ==
Born in Thái Bình, Văn Phong started playing football at an early age. In 2008, he represented his school team in a football tournament is his province and was offered by a Hòa Phát Hà Nội manager to join the team after his good performances. Văn Phong accepted the offer and played for the youth categories of Hòa Phát Hà Nội for four years before getting released in 2012.

== Club career ==
In 2013, Văn Phong signed for V.League 2 team Đồng Nai. He spent the first two seasons being unused, before getting chosen to be the starter goalkeeper during the 2016 season. His performances helped his team qualify for the promotion play-offs but the team were defeated by Nam Định. Therefore, Văn Phong was named as Đồng Nai's player of the season.

In December 2016, Văn Phong joined V.League 1 side Sài Gòn. He was the back-up goalkeeper during three seasons before Vũ Như Thành's arrival as the head coach in 2020, who trusted in Văn Phong's abilities. In his first season being the starter for Sài Gòn, Văn Phong made several crucial saves as his team finished third in the league for the first time in their history.

On 15 December 2022, Văn Phong joined Viettel.

In July 2026, Văn Phong moved to newly promoted V.League 1 club Đồng Nai City.

== International career ==
In December 2015, Văn Phong was named by coach Toshiya Miura in Vietnam U23's preliminary squad for the 2016 AFC U-23 Championship but was dropped out in the final list.

In May 2021, Văn Phong received his first called up to Vietnam national team.
