= Lưu Tấn Liêm =

Vietnamese footballer

Lưu Tấn Liêm is a Vietnamese former footballer.

== Early life ==
He is the son of Vietnamese footballer Lưu Tấn Ngọc.

== Career ==
He played for the Vietnam national team.

== Style of play ==
He was described as "aggressive and clever playing style".

== Personal life ==
He has a daughter.
