= Bình Phước Stadium =

Football stadium in Vietnam

Coordinates: 11.5290°N 106.8787°E

- Sân vận động Bình Phước
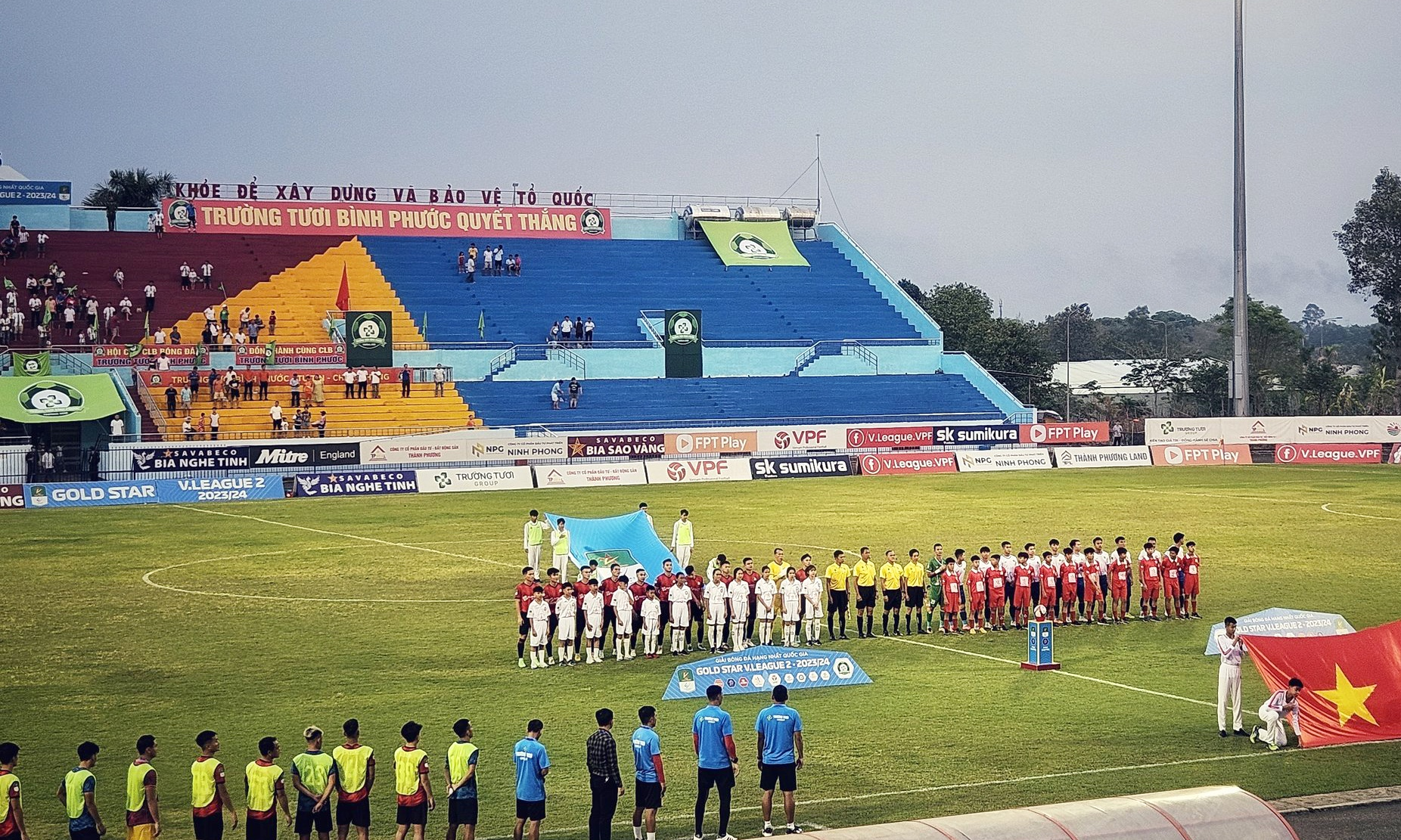
- Location: National Road 14, Bình Phước, Đồng Nai, Vietnam
- Capacity: 11,000 (initial); 6,000 (current)

Construction
- Built: 2010

Tenant
- Đồng Nai City

Bình Phước Stadium (Vietnamese: Sân vận động Bình Phước) is a stadium located on National Road 14, Bình Phước, Đồng Nai, Vietnam. It has a seating capacity of 11,000. It is the home stadium of Đồng Nai City, a football club currently competing in the V.League 1.

The seating arrangement for the stands is as follows:

- Covered Stand A: 1,000 seats

- Uncovered Stand B: 10,000 seats (5,000 seats remaining after seat installation)

== History ==
This stadium was built in 2010. In 2018, a 900-lux lighting system worth 11 billion VND was installed, along with an LED scoreboard for the Bình Phước Stadium. In March 2021, the A grandstand of the Bình Phước Stadium was renovated with a steel structure, funded by the Ministry of Culture, Sports and Tourism of Bình Phước province.

In 2024, the stadium had all the seats in Stand B replaced and LED advertising installed throughout the stadium.
