= Phạm Văn Hữu =

Vietnamese footballer

Personal information
- Full name: Phạm Văn Hữu
- Date of birth: 3 June 2001 (age 25)
- Place of birth: Pleiku, Gia Lai, Vietnam
- Height: 1.65 m (5 ft 5 in)
- Positions: Winger; attacking midfielder

Team information
- Current team: SHB Đà Nẵng
- Number: 16

Youth career
- 2016: Hoàng Anh Gia Lai
- 2016–2022: SHB Đà Nẵng

Senior career*
| Years | Team | Apps | (Gls) |
| 2022– | SHB Đà Nẵng | 69 | (6) |

International career^{‡}
| 2019–2020 | Vietnam U19 | 5 | (0) |
| 2022–2024 | Vietnam U23 | 3 | (0) |
Medal record
Men's football
Representing Vietnam
AFF U-23 Championship
| Winner | Cambodia 2022 | Team |
- * Club domestic league appearances and goals as of 7 June 2026 ‡ National team caps and goals as of 10 April 2024

Phạm Văn Hữu (born 3 June 2001) is a Vietnamese professional footballer who plays as a winger or attacking midfielder for the V.League 1 club SHB Đà Nẵng.

== Club career ==
Born in Gia Lai, Văn Hữu started playing football at an early age. He applied five times to join the prestigious local Hoàng Anh Gia Lai Academy, but he failed all his attempts. In 2016, he temporarily signed Hoàng Anh Gia Lai under-15 side because the team lacked players for the national championship but was released by the club after the tournament ended.

In 2017, Văn Hữu joined the SHB Đà Nẵng youth academy. He was promoted to the first team in 2022 and was an important substitute player for the team. However, he had fewer game time in the 2023 season due the club's bad results. SHB Đà Nẵng ended the season in the last place and relegated to the V.League 2.

== International career ==
In January 2022, Văn Hữu took part in the 2022 AFF U-23 Championship with Vietnam national under-23 team. He appeared in the opening game against Singapore, assisted twice in a 7–0 win. After the match, he tested positive for COVID-19 and was removed from the squad. His teammates later secured the title after the 1–0 against Thailand in the final.

== Honours ==
SHB Đà Nẵng

- V.League 2: 2023–24

Vietnam U23

- AFF U-23 Championship: 2022
