= Dương Văn Khoa =

Vietnamese footballer (born 1994)

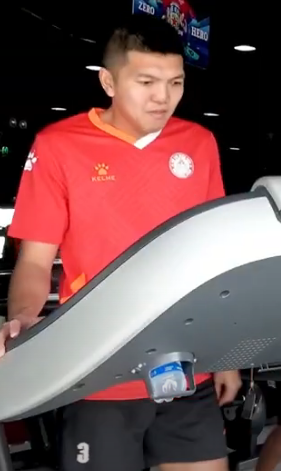
- Văn Khoa in 2022

Personal information
- Full name: Dương Văn Khoa
- Date of birth: May 6, 1994 (age 32)
- Place of birth: Hải Hà, Quảng Ninh, Vietnam
- Height: 1.72 m (5 ft 8 in)
- Position: Left-back

Team information
- Current team: Đồng Nai City
- Number: 2

Youth career
- 2010–2014: Than Quảng Ninh

Senior career*
Years	Team	Apps	(Gls)
2015–2021	Than Quảng Ninh	113	(0)
2022	Hồ Chí Minh City	13	(0)
2023–2024	Hải Phòng	13	(0)
2024–2025	Quy Nhơn Bình Định	25	(1)
2025–	Đồng Nai City	21	(4)
- * Club domestic league appearances and goals as of 6 June 2026

Dương Văn Khoa (born 6 May 1994) is a Vietnamese professional footballer who plays as a left-back for V.League 1 club Đồng Nai City.

== Club career ==
On 7 August 2022, in the match between Hồ Chí Minh City against Nam Định, Văn Khoa punched Nam Định's player Phạm Mạnh Hùng after he was burked by him. Văn Khoa then received a direct red card.

== International career ==
Van Khoa was called up by coach Toshiya Miura to the Vietnam U-23's squad to compete in the 2016 AFC U-23 Championship. However, he suddenly suffered a serious strain injury and was removed from the list.

== Honours ==
Trường Tươi Đồng Nai

- V.League 2: 2025–26

Individual

- V.League 2 Team of the Season: 2025–26
