= Bùi Văn Bình =

Vietnamese footballer (born 2003)

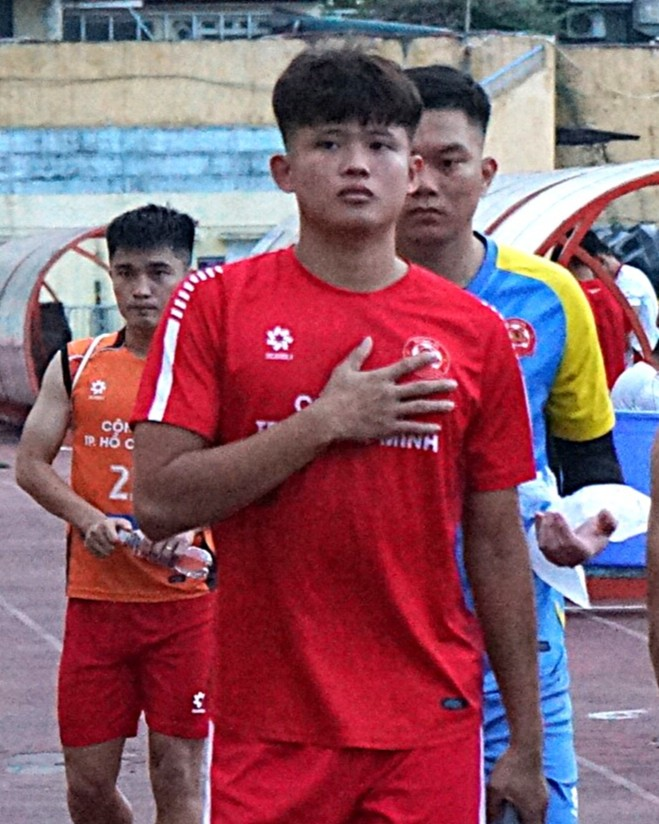
- Văn Bình in 2026

Personal information
- Full name: Bùi Văn Bình
- Date of birth: 27 December 2003 (age 22)
- Place of birth: Vĩnh Long, Vietnam
- Height: 1.78 m (5 ft 10 in)
- Position: Striker

Team information
- Current team: Công An Hồ Chí Minh City
- Number: 27

Youth career
- 2017–2019: PVF
- 2019–2022: Sài Gòn

Senior career*
Years	Team	Apps	(Gls)
2020–2021	→ Hồ Chí Minh City Youth (loan)	?	(3)
2022–2023	Hồ Chí Minh City Youth	?	(5)
2023–2025	Bà Rịa-Vũng Tàu	25	(14)
2025–	Công An Hồ Chí Minh City	21	(2)

International career
2024–	Vietnam U23	2	(0)
- * Club domestic league appearances and goals as of 15 March 2026

Bùi Văn Bình (born 27 December 2003) is a Vietnamese professional footballer who plays as a striker for V.League 1 club Công An Hồ Chí Minh City

== Early career ==
Born in Vĩnh Long, Bình began his career at the PVF Football Academy before being released in 2019 due to his short height at that time (1.62 m). He then joined Sài Gòn youth academy, where he spent 3 years before the club was dissolved. After that, he joined same-city fellow Thống Nhất Sports Center and played to their team Hồ Chí Minh City Youth in the Vietnamese Second Division.

== Club career ==
In 2023, Bình signed for V.League 2 side Bà Rịa-Vũng Tàu. In his first season at professional level, he immediately gained a starter spot at the club. In the last matchday of the 2023–24 V.League 2 against Phù Đổng Ninh Bình, he netted 4 goals in a 4–2 win, leading him to have a total of 11 goals and thus win the league top scorer award. Additionally, Bình was also named in the league's team of the season.

In February 2025, Bình joined V.League 1 club Hồ Chí Minh City.

== Honours ==
Công An Hồ Chí Minh City

- Vietnamese National Cup: 2025–26

Individual

- V.League 2 top scorer: 2023–24
- V.League 2 Team of the season: 2023–24
