= Phan Văn Long =

Vietnamese footballer (born 1996)

Personal information
- Full name: Phan Văn Long
- Date of birth: June 1, 1996 (age 30)
- Place of birth: Tam Kỳ, Quảng Nam, Vietnam
- Height: 1.78 m (5 ft 10 in)
- Position: Winger

Team information
- Current team: SHB Đà Nẵng
- Number: 11

Youth career
- 2008–2014: SHB Đà Nẵng

Senior career*
Years	Team	Apps	(Gls)
2015–	SHB Đà Nẵng	173	(24)

International career^{‡}
2013–2014	Vietnam U19	5	(2)
2014–2015	Vietnam U21	6	(3)
2015–2017	Vietnam U23	2	(0)
- * Club domestic league appearances and goals as of 7 June 2026 ‡ National team caps and goals as of 25 August 2017

Phan Văn Long (born 1 June 1996) is a Vietnamese professional footballer who plays as a winger for V.League 1 club SHB Đà Nẵng.

== Honours ==
SHB Đà Nẵng

- V.League 2: 2023–24

== International goals ==
No.	Date	Venue	Opponent	Score	Result	Competition
1.	9 December 2017	New I-Mobile Stadium, Buriram, Thailand	Myanmar	3–0	4–0	2017 M-150 Cup
