= 2023–24 V.League 2 =

- Season: 2023–24
- Dates: 20 October 2023 – 29 June 2024
- Champions: SHB Da Nang
- Promoted: SHB Da Nang
- Relegated: Phu Tho
- Matches: 110
- Goals: 237 (2.15 per match)
- Top goalscorer: Bùi Văn Bình (11 goals)
- Biggest home win: Ba Ria-Vung Tau 4–0 Dong Nai (5 November 2023); Long An 6–2 Phu Tho (29 June 2024); PVF-CAND FC 4–0 Dong Nai (29 June 2024)
- Biggest away win: Phu Tho 0–4 SHB Da Nang (3 December 2023)
- Highest scoring: Ba Ria-Vung Tau 5–3 Long An (25 February 2024); Long An 6–2 Phu Tho (29 June 2024)
- Longest winning run: SHB Da Nang (5 matches)
- Longest unbeaten run: SHB Da Nang; PVF-CAND (13 matches)
- Longest winless run: Phu Tho (10 matches)
- Longest losing run: Phu Tho (7 matches)
- Highest attendance: 6,000; Truong Tuoi Binh Phuoc 0–0 PVF-CAND (10 May 2024); Truong Tuoi Binh Phuoc 3–0 Dong Nai (19 May 2024)
- Lowest attendance: 100; Phu Tho 0–3 Long An (31 October 2023)
- Total attendance: 181,350
- Average attendance: 1,649
- All statistics correct as of 29 June 2024.

The 2023–24 V.League 2, known as the Gold Star V.League 2 (Vietnamese: Giải bóng đá Hạng Nhất Quốc gia Bia Sao Vàng 2023–24) for sponsorship reasons, was the 30th season of V. League 2, Vietnam's second tier professional football league. The season began on 21 October 2023 and ended on 29 June 2024.

This season will be the first since the 2001-02 season to have an inter-year schedule (autumn-to-spring) instead of an intra-year schedule (spring-to-autumn). There will also be a break from 25 December 2023 to 10 February 2024 for the 2023 AFC Asian Cup and from 7 April 2024 to 3 May 2024 for the 2024 AFC U-23 Asian Cup.

Like the previous season, teams won't be allowed to register any foreign players, but will be allotted a non-naturalized Vietnamese player slot.

== Team changes ==
The following teams have changed division since the 2023 season:

Promoted from 2023 Second Division	Relegated from 2023 V.League 1	Promoted to 2023–24 V.League 1	Relegated to 2024 Second Division	Not engaged
Dong Nai; Dong Thap	SHB Da Nang	Quang Nam	None	~~Binh Thuan~~

=== Withdrawn clubs ===
On 10 October 2023, Binh Thuan announced they would not participate in the 2023–24 V.League 2 due to financial difficulties, leaving the league with one team less.

=== Name changes ===
- On 3 October 2023, Phu Dong FC changed their name to Phu Dong Ninh Binh FC.
- On 3 October 2023, Binh Phuoc FC changed their name to Truong Tuoi Binh Phuoc FC.

== Participating clubs by province ==
Locations of the 2023 V.League 2 teams

Team	Location	Stadium	Capacity	Previous season rank
Ba Ria-Vung Tau	Ba Ria–Vung Tau	Ba Ria	10,000	VL2 (9th)
Dong Nai	Dong Nai	Dong Nai	30,000	SD (playoffs)
Dong Thap	Dong Thap	Cao Lanh	23,000	SD (playoffs)
Hoa Binh	Hoa Binh	Hoa Binh	3,600	VL2 (4th)
Hue	Thua Thien Hue	Tu Do	25,000	VL2 (6th)
Long An	Long An	Long An	20,000	VL2 (3rd)
Phu Dong Ninh Binh	Ninh Binh	Ninh Binh	22,000	VL2 (7th)
Phu Tho	Phu Tho	Viet Tri	18,000	VL2 (8th)
PVF-CAND	Hung Yen	PVF	4,500	VL2 (2nd)
SHB Da Nang	Da Nang	Hoa Xuan	20,000	VL1 (14th)
Truong Tuoi Binh Phuoc	Bình Phước	Binh Phuoc	11,000	VL2 (10th & playoffs winner)

=== Number of teams by region ===
Number	Region	Team(s)
3	Southeast	Ba Ria Vung Tau FC, Truong Tuoi Binh Phuoc, Dong Nai FC
2	Red River Delta	PVF-CAND, Phu Dong Ninh Binh
2	Mekong River Delta	Dong Thap FC, Long An FC
1	Northeast	Phu Tho FC
1	Northwest	Hoa Binh FC
1	North Central	Hue FC
1	South Central	SHB Da Nang

== Personnel and kits ==
Team	Manager	Captain	Kit manufacturer	Shirt sponsor
Ba Ria-Vung Tau	(Vietnam) Nguyễn Minh Phương	(Vietnam) Tô Phương Thịnh	(Vietnam) Mira	
Dong Nai	(Vietnam) Bùi Hữu Thái Sơn	(Vietnam) Cao Quốc Khánh	(Vietnam) Demenino Sport	(Vietnam) AP Education Group
Dong Thap	(Vietnam) Bùi Văn Đông	(Vietnam) Trần Hữu Thắng	(Vietnam) Mon Amie Veston	(Vietnam) Van Hien University (Vietnam) Happy Foods
Hoa Binh	(Vietnam) Hồ Thanh Thưởng	(Vietnam) Trần Hữu Hoàng	(Vietnam) Kamito	(South Korea) K-Elec
Hue	(Vietnam) Nguyễn Đức Dũng	(Vietnam) Nguyễn Tiến Tạo	(Vietnam) CR Sports	
Long An	(Vietnam) Ngô Quang Sang	(Vietnam) Nguyễn Tài Lộc	(Vietnam) Demenino Sport	(Vietnam) Long An Port
Phu Dong Ninh Binh	(Vietnam) Nguyễn Văn Đàn	(Vietnam) Lê Vũ Quốc Nhật	(England) Mitre	(Vietnam) Phu An Thinh Group
Phu Tho	(Vietnam) Nghiêm Xuân Mạnh	(Vietnam) Hoàng Anh Tuấn	(Vietnam) Vevoca	
PVF-CAND	(Portugal) Mauro Jerónimo	(Vietnam) Huỳnh Công Đến	(England) Mitre	
SHB Da Nang	(Vietnam) Trương Việt Hoàng	(Vietnam) Đặng Anh Tuấn	(Vietnam) Kamito	(Vietnam) SHB (Japan) Murata
Truong Tuoi Binh Phuoc	(Vietnam) Nguyễn Anh Đức	(Vietnam) Hoàng Minh Tâm	(Vietnam) Fraser	(Vietnam) Truong Tuoi Group

=== Managerial changes ===
Team	Outgoing manager	Manner of departure	Date of vacancy	Position in table	Incoming manager	Date of appointment
SHB Da Nang	(Vietnam) Phạm Minh Đức	Resigned	16 August 2023	Pre-season	(Vietnam) Trương Việt Hoàng	29 August 2023
Truong Tuoi Binh Phuoc	(Vietnam) Lê Thanh Xuân	Resigned	26 August 2023	Pre-season	(Vietnam) Nguyễn Anh Đức	27 September 2023
Hoa Binh	(Vietnam) Lê Quốc Vượng	Resigned	29 August 2023	Pre-season	(Vietnam) Phạm Thành Lương	6 September 2023
Long An	(Vietnam) Nguyễn Anh Đức	Resigned	8 September 2023	Pre-season	(Vietnam) Ngô Quang Sang	13 October 2023
Dong Thap	(Vietnam) Phan Thanh Bình	Appointed as youth team manager	2 October 2023	Pre-season	(Vietnam) Bùi Văn Đông	2 October 2023
Dong Nai	(Vietnam) Bùi Hữu Thái Sơn	Mutual consent	20 October 2023	Pre-season	(Vietnam) Nguyễn Văn Dũng	20 October 2023
Dong Nai	(Vietnam) Nguyễn Văn Dũng	Sacked	3 December 2023	7th	(Vietnam) Bùi Hữu Thái Sơn	6 December 2023
Phu Tho	(Vietnam) Hồ Hoàng Tiến	Mutual consent	9 January 2024	11th	(Vietnam) Vũ Như Thành	9 January 2024
Phu Tho	(Vietnam) Vũ Như Thành	Resigned	21 February 2024	11th	(Vietnam) Nghiêm Xuân Mạnh	21 February 2024
Hoa Binh	(Vietnam) Phạm Thành Lương	Resigned	12 March 2024	10th	(Vietnam) Hồ Thanh Thưởng	19 March 2024

== Standings ==
=== League table ===
Pos	Team	Pld	W	D	L	GF	GA	GD	Pts	Promotion or relegation
1	SHB Da Nang (C, P)	20	13	5	2	37	10	+27	44	Promotion to 2024–25 V.League 1
2	PVF-CAND	20	9	10	1	26	7	+19	37	Qualification to promotion play-offs
3	Truong Tuoi Binh Phuoc	20	10	5	5	28	15	+13	35	
4	Hue	20	8	6	6	26	22	+4	30	
5	Phu Dong Ninh Binh	20	7	7	6	17	20	−3	28	
6	Long An	20	7	6	7	35	34	+1	27	
7	Ba Ria-Vung Tau	20	8	2	10	28	27	+1	26	
8	Hoa Binh	20	5	8	7	11	19	−8	23	
9	Dong Nai	20	6	5	9	12	21	−9	23	
10	Dong Thap	20	5	5	10	11	19	−8	20	
11	Phu Tho (R)	20	1	3	16	6	43	−37	6	Relegation to Vietnamese Second Division

Updated to match(es) played on 29 June 2024. Source: VPF
Rules for classification: 1) Points; 2) Goal difference; 3) Head-to-head points; 4) Goals scored; 5) Away goals scored; 6) Disciplinary points.
(C) Champions; (P) Promoted; (R) Relegated

=== Results ===
Home \ Away	BRV	BIN	DNA	DTH	HBH	HUE	LAN	PHD	PHT	PVF	SDN
Ba Ria-Vung Tau		0–2	4–0	2–0	1–0	2–2	5–3	4–2	3–0	1–0	1–3
Truong Tuoi Binh Phuoc	2–1		3–0	1–0	2–0	2–1	2–1	1–1	3–0	0–0	1–0
Dong Nai	1–0	2–1		1–0	0–0	1–1	2–0	0–1	3–0	0–0	0–1
Dong Thap	2–0	1–0	0–0		2–0	2–2	0–0	0–0	1–0	0–0	0–2
Hoa Binh	1–0	1–1	1–0	1–0		0–2	1–1	0–0	1–0	1–1	0–2
Hue	2–1	1–0	0–2	1–0	2–0		1–2	2–0	0–0	0–0	2–2
Long An	2–0	2–2	3–0	1–0	1–1	3–1		1–1	6–2	2–2	2–5
Phu Dong Ninh Binh	2–1	1–0	0–0	1–0	1–2	1–3	2–1		2–1	0–0	1–0
Phu Tho	0–2	0–3	1–0	1–2	1–1	0–2	0–3	0–0		0–1	0–4
PVF-CAND	3–0	1–0	4–0	3–0	0–0	2–1	4–1	2–1	3–0		0–0
SHB Da Nang	0–0	2–2	1–0	3–1	2–0	2–0	3–0	2–0	3–0	0–0	

Updated to match(es) played on 29 June 2024. Source: VPF
Legend: Blue = home team win; Yellow = draw; Red = away team win.

=== Position by round ===
Team ╲ Round	1	2	3	4	5	6	7	8	9	10	11	12	13	14	15	16	17	18	19	20	21	22
Ba Ria-Vung Tau	1	4	7	5	2	3	3	4	4	3	4	4	6	6	5	6	6	7	7	7	7	7
Truong Tuoi Binh Phuoc	5	2	5	6	7	4	5	6	5	6	7	5	3	3	4	3	3	3	3	3	3	3
Dong Nai	4	7	6	7	6	9	8	5	7	9	8	8	9	9	8	10	9	10	9	8	8	9
Dong Thap	9	10	10	9	10	10	10	10	9	8	9	9	7	8	9	9	10	8	10	9	10	10
Hoa Binh	6	8	9	10	8	6	7	8	10	10	10	10	10	10	10	8	8	9	8	10	9	8
Hue	10	5	3	2	4	2	2	2	3	2	3	3	5	5	6	7	7	6	5	5	5	4
Long An	8	3	2	4	3	7	9	9	6	7	5	6	4	4	3	4	4	5	6	6	6	6
Phu Dong Ninh Binh	3	6	4	3	5	5	6	7	8	5	6	7	8	7	7	5	5	4	4	4	4	5
Phu Tho	11	11	11	11	11	11	11	11	11	11	11	11	11	11	11	11	11	11	11	11	11	11
PVF-CAND	7	9	8	8	9	8	4	3	2	4	2	2	2	2	2	2	2	2	2	2	2	2
SHB Da Nang	2	1	1	1	1	1	1	1	1	1	1	1	1	1	1	1	1	1	1	1	1	1

Promotion to 2024–25 V.League 1
Qualification for promotion play-offs
Relegation to Vietnamese Second Division

Source: VPF

== Season statistics ==
=== Top goalscorers ===
As of 29 June 2024

Rank	Player	Club	Goals
1	(Vietnam) Bùi Văn Bình	Ba Ria-Vung Tau	11
2	(Vietnam) Hồ Thanh Minh	Hue	10
2	(Vietnam) Lê Thanh Phong	Long An	10
4	(Vietnam) Phan Văn Long	SHB Da Nang	8
4	(Vietnam) Cù Nguyễn Khánh	Long An	8
6	(Vietnam) Nguyễn Minh Quang	SHB Da Nang	7
7	(Vietnam) Cao Hoàng Tú	Dong Nai	5
7	(Vietnam) Lương Thanh Ngọc Lâm	Ba Ria-Vung Tau	5
7	(Vietnam) Phạm Văn Hữu	SHB Da Nang	5
10	(Vietnam) Thái Bá Đạt	PVF-CAND	4
10	(Vietnam) Nguyễn Xuân Nam	PVF-CAND	4
10	(Vietnam) Nguyễn Thanh Nhàn	PVF-CAND	4
10	(Vietnam) Nguyễn Văn Vinh	Truong Tuoi Binh Phuoc	4
10	(Vietnam) Điểu Quy	Truong Tuoi Binh Phuoc	4

=== Hat-tricks ===
Player	For	Against	Result	Date
(Vietnam) Nguyễn Minh Quang	SHB Da Nang	Long An	3–0 (H)	11 May 2024
(Vietnam) Bùi Văn Bình^{4}	Ba Ria-Vung Tau	Phu Dong Ninh Binh	4–2 (H)	29 June 2024

== Awards ==
=== Annual awards ===
Award	Winner	Club
Player of the Year	(Vietnam) Đặng Anh Tuấn	SHB Da Nang
Best Young Player	(Vietnam) Nguyễn Thành Đạt	Truong Tuoi Binh Phuoc

Best XI
Goalkeeper	(Vietnam) Phí Minh Long (PVF-CAND)			
Defenders	(Vietnam) Hà Châu Phi (Truong Tuoi Binh Phuoc)	(Vietnam) Nguyễn Hữu Thái Bảo (Truong Tuoi Binh Phuoc)	(Vietnam) Lương Duy Cương (SHB Da Nang)	(Vietnam) Nguyễn Công Nhật (SHB Da Nang)
Midfielders	(Vietnam) Phan Văn Long (SHB Da Nang)	(Vietnam) Lưu Tự Nhân (Truong Tuoi Binh Phuoc)	(Vietnam) Đặng Anh Tuấn (SHB Da Nang)	(Vietnam) Nguyễn Thanh Nhàn (PVF-CAND)
Forwards	(Vietnam) Bùi Văn Bình (Ba Ria-Vung Tau)		(Vietnam) Hồ Thanh Minh (Hue)	

== Controversy ==
In 2024, five players of Ba Ria-Vung Tau FC, including Nguyễn Sơn Hải, Trần Kỳ Anh, Nguyễn Quang Huy, Lê Bằng Gia Huy and Phạm Văn Phong were arrested for betting and suspicions of match fixing during the team's 1–3 defeat against SHB Danang that took place on 23 December 2023.
