= Chi Lăng Stadium (2016) =

Football stadium in Da Nang, Vietnam

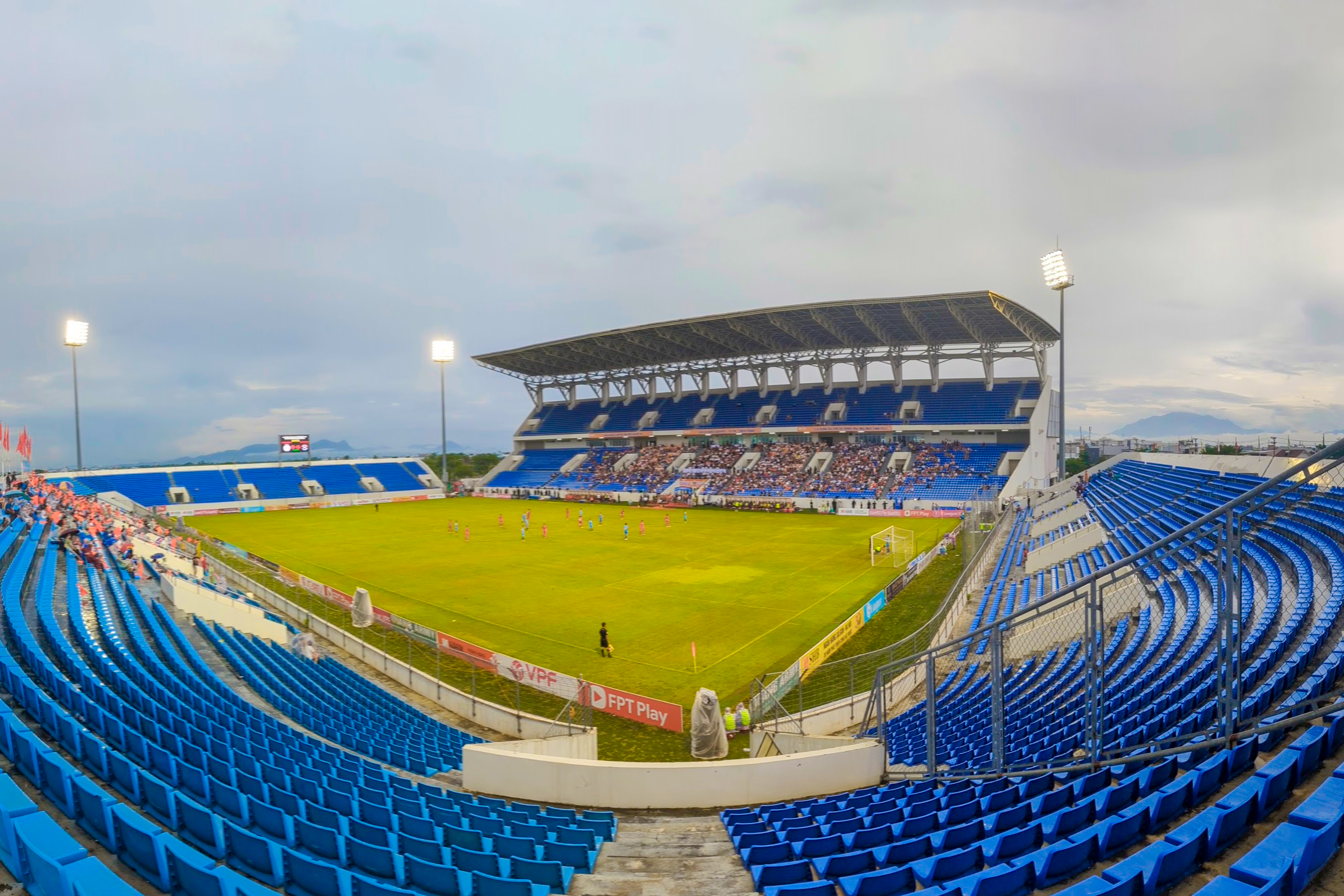
- Chi Lăng Stadium at dusk
- Interactive map of Chi Lăng Stadium
- Former names: Hòa Xuân Stadium (until 2025)
- Address: Vietnam
- Location: Hoà Xuân ward, Da Nang, Vietnam
- Coordinates: 15°59′57″N 108°13′24″E
- Owner: Da Nang People's Committee
- Operator: SHB Da Nang FC
- Capacity: 20,500
- Surface: Zeon Zoysia grass
- Field size: 105 m × 68 m (344 ft × 223 ft)
- Public transit: 7 – Xuan Dieu – Hoa Phuoc; 12 – Xuan Dieu – Pham Hung

Construction
- Groundbreaking: 2013
- Built: February 2013 – 30 August 2016
- Opened: 30 August 2016
- Cost: 300 billion VND

Tenant
- SHB Da Nang FC

Chi Lăng Stadium (Vietnamese: Sân vận động Chi Lăng), formerly known as Hòa Xuân Stadium, is a football stadium located in Hoà Xuân ward, Da Nang, Vietnam. It currently serves as the home ground of SHB Da Nang FC. With a seating capacity of 20,500, it is the largest football-specific stadium in Vietnam and the second football-specific stadium to be built in the country, following Pleiku Stadium in Gia Lai Province.

== Construction ==
The construction contract for four stands (A, B, C, D), the playing field, and surrounding technical infrastructure was executed by Da Nang Infrastructure Development and Construction JSC (DCID) with a total value of over VND 300 billion. The lighting system was built by Thanh Lam Sports Co., Ltd. with an estimated value of nearly VND 13 billion.

Construction began on 21 February 2013, and was completed on 30 August 2016.

On 14 December 2016, the stadium was officially handed over to the Da Nang Department of Culture and Sports for operation ahead of the 2017 V.League season. SHB Da Nang won 1–0 against Hoang Anh Gia Lai FC in the opening match on 7 January 2017, marking the stadium's inaugural game.

== Stadium ==
The stadium has a capacity of 20,500 and is built on a land area of 66,530 square meters. It features four stands, with the main stand (Stand A) being two stories high and covered with a roof. The other stands are lower and do not have roofs. Beneath the stands are beverage stalls, functional rooms, and restrooms.

There are 140 super VIP seats (with desks) located at the center of Stand A. The stadium is equipped with anti-riot fencing and partitions separating the B, C, and D stands. It also includes signage systems, functional rooms, an electronic scoreboard, a sound system, and a backup power supply.

In 2025, the playing surface and its drainage and irrigation systems were upgraded. Notably, the turf was changed from Bermuda grass to Zeon Zoysia, a premium grass type specifically used for football pitches and certified by ITGAP.

The facility was known as the Hòa Xuân Stadium until December 2025 when the Da Nang people's council renamed the venue after the former Chi Lăng Stadium built in 1954.

== Facilities ==
With a capacity of approximately 20,500 seats, Chi Lăng Stadium is considered one of the most modern football-specific stadiums at the club level in Vietnam. All spectator stands are fitted with seating, and only the main stand (Stand A) has a roof.

Similar to many European stadiums, there is no running track, allowing spectators to view matches at a close distance to the pitch. The stadium also includes international-standard facilities such as a press room, locker rooms, medical room, massage room, and a traditional exhibition room for SHB Da Nang FC. All facilities are equipped with modern systems and functionally arranged.

== Gallery ==
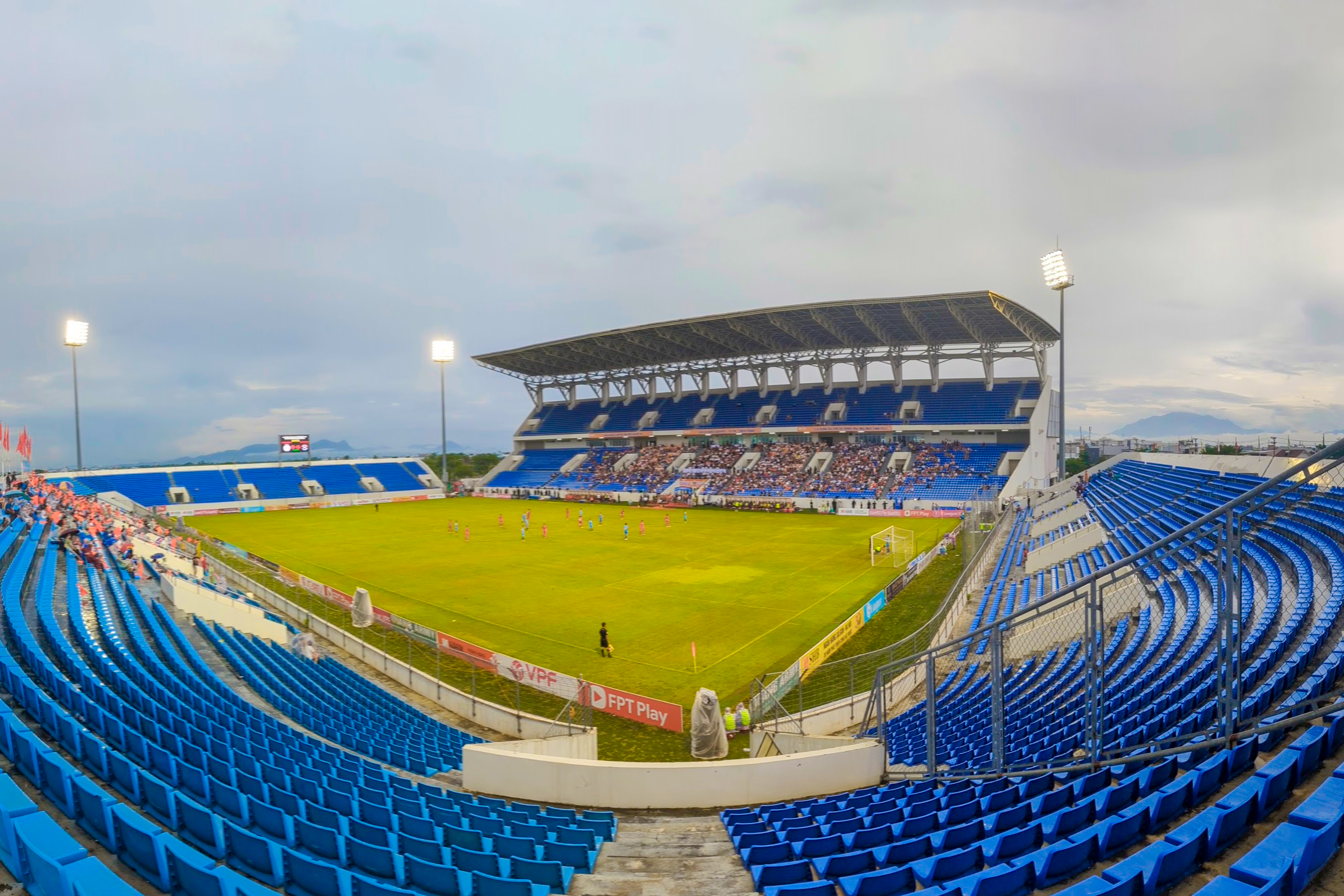
Panoramic view of the stadium

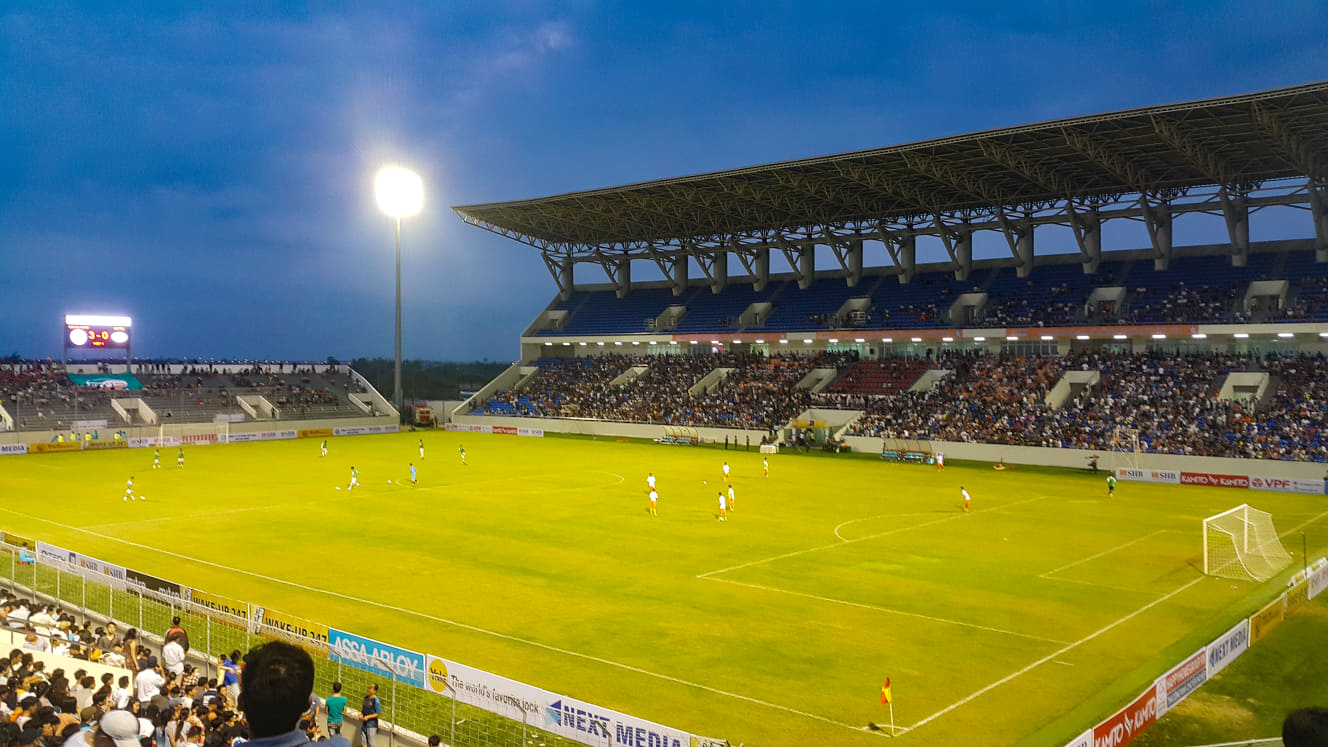

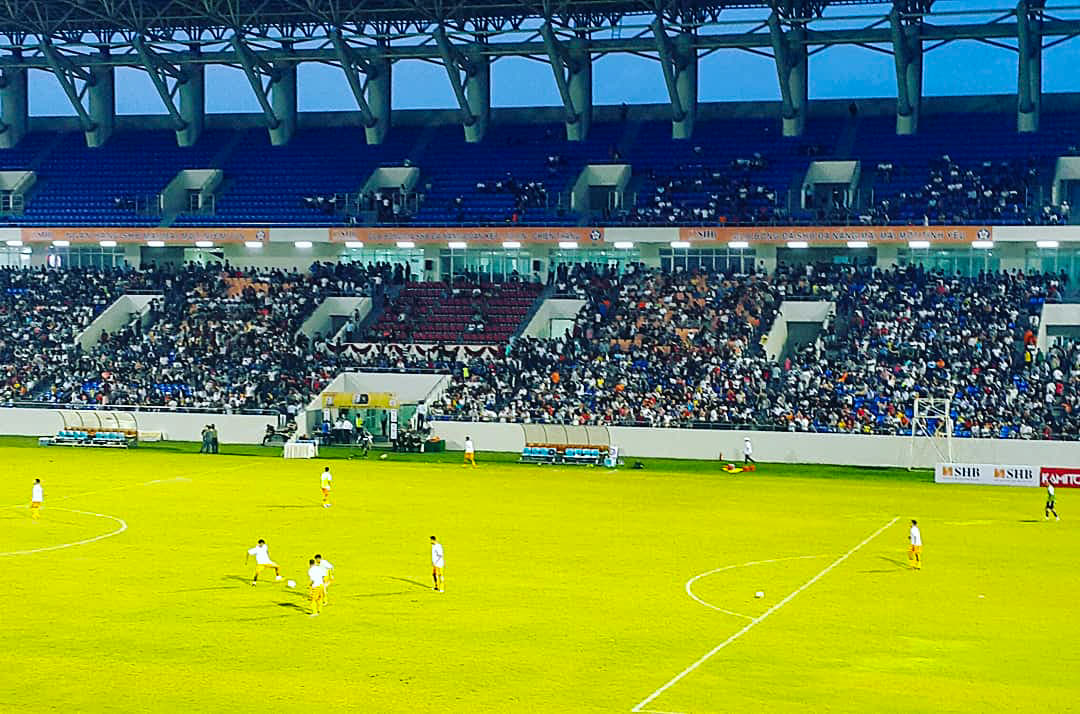

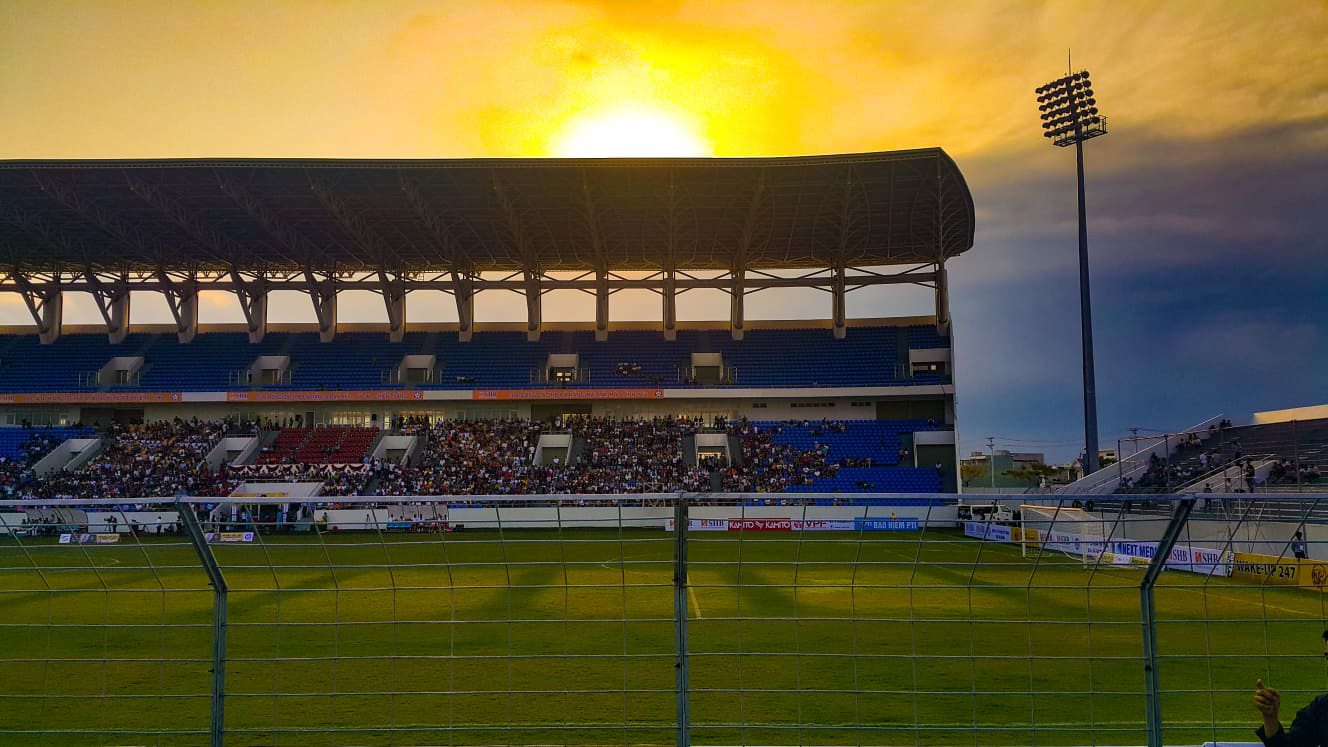
Stand A

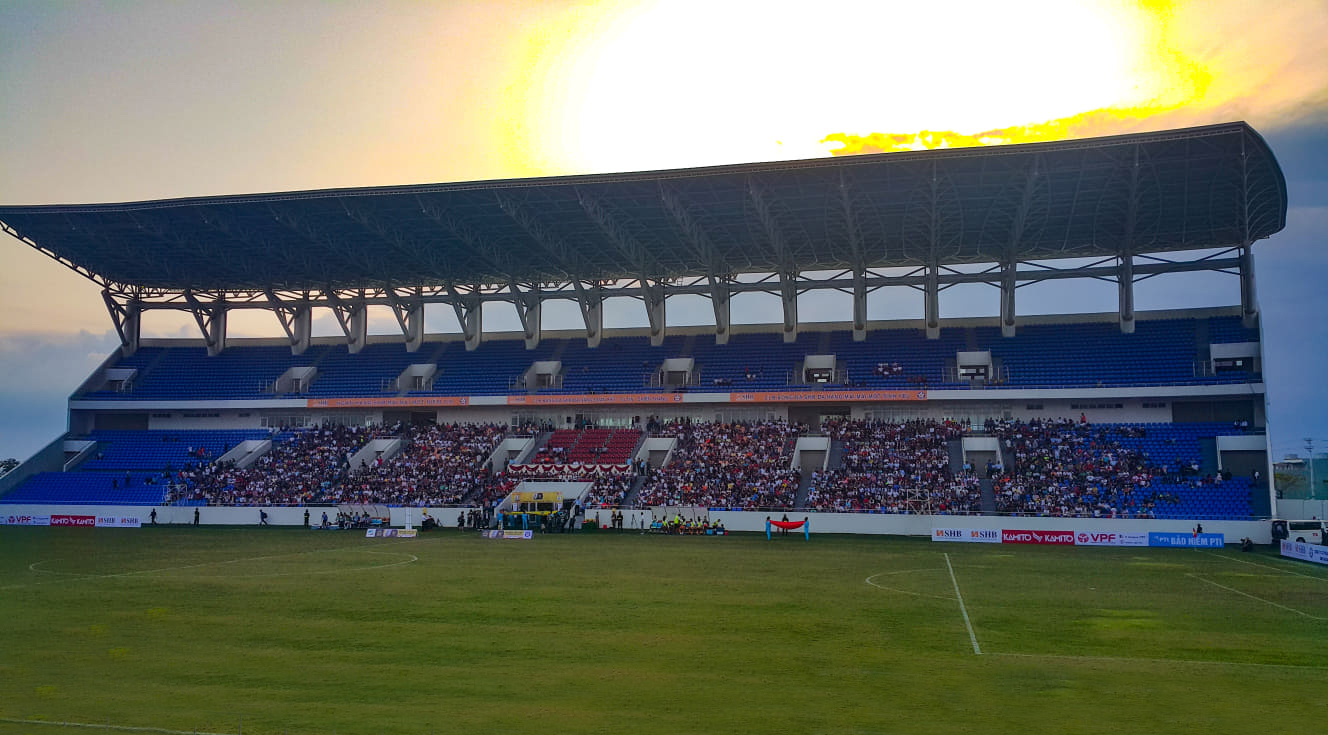
Another view of Stand A
