= Dong Nai City FC =

Vietnamese football club

Đồng Nai City
- Full name: Đồng Nai City Football Club
- Nickname: Những chiến binh Xanh (Green Warriors)
- Founded: 2006; 20 years ago as Bình Phước
- Ground: Bình Phước Stadium
- Capacity: 11,000
- Chairman: Phạm Hương Sơn
- Head coach: Nguyễn Việt Thắng
- League: V.League 1
- 2025–26: V.League 2, 1st of 12 (promoted)
- Website: Club website
Home colours	Away colours	Third colours

Đồng Nai City Football Club (Vietnamese: Câu lạc bộ Bóng đá Thành phố Đồng Nai), formerly known as Bình Phước and Trường Tươi Bình Phước, is a professional football club, based in Đồng Xoài ward, Đồng Nai, Vietnam, that plays in the V.League 1, the top-flight of Vietnamese football.

== History ==
Bình Phước Football Club was established in 2006 and entered the Vietnamese Third Division in the following year. From 2007 to 2010, the club competed in the Third Division, after securing promotion to the Second Division for the 2011 season. The club remained in the Second Division for only one season before being relegated in 2012. However, they made a strong comeback in the 2013 season, earning promotion with a perfect group-stage record.

At the conclusion of the 2014 Second Division, Bình Phước delivered an outstanding performance and gained promotion to the 2015 V.League 2 as they topped their group and defeat Kon Tum 4–0 in the promotion play-off on 19 May 2014.

In October 2023, Bình Phước was taken over by the Trường Tươi Group Joint Stock Company and changed their name to Trường Tươi Bình Phước. The new owner invested heavily to upgrade the team by bringing several experienced coaches and players, with the objectif to promote to the Vietnamese top-flight. In the 2023–24 season, Trường Tươi Bình Phước finished third in the V.League 2. In the following season, they finish as league runners-up and qualify for the promotion play-off game, but was defeated by SHB Đà Nẵng.

On 1 August 2025, after Bình Phước province was merged to Đồng Nai province, Trường Tươi Bình Phước changed their name to Trường Tươi Đồng Nai.

=== As Đồng Nai City (2026–present) ===
Trường Tươi Đồng Nai secure promotion to V.League 1 for the first time in their history from next season after finishing as champions of V.League 2 in the 2025–26 season. Shortly after their promotion, the club changed their name to Đồng Nai City.

== Players ==
=== Current squad ===
As of 26 August 2026.

Note: Flags indicate national team as defined under FIFA eligibility rules; some limited exceptions apply. Players may hold more than one non-FIFA nationality.

No.	Pos.	Nation	Player
1	GK	VIE	Bùi Tấn Trường
2	DF	VIE	Dương Văn Khoa
3	DF	VIE	Huỳnh Tấn Sinh
5	DF	VIE	Nguyễn Thành Lộc
6	MF	VIE	Lương Xuân Trường
7	MF	SRB	Miloš Vulić
9	FW	ROU	Andrei Ivan
10	FW	VIE	Nguyễn Công Phượng
11	FW	SRB	Andrija Majdevac
12	MF	VIE	Uông Ngọc Tiến
13	DF	VIE	Nguyễn Thanh Thảo
14	MF	VIE	Nguyễn Quốc Lộc
15	DF	VIE	Nguyễn Hữu Tuấn
16	DF	VIE	Lê Văn Sơn
17	GK	VIE	Phạm Văn Phong

No.	Pos.	Nation	Player
18	DF	VIE	Nguyễn Văn Đức
19	MF	VIE	Lương Thanh Ngọc Lâm
20	MF	VIE	Lưu Tự Nhân
21	MF	VIE	Chu Văn Kiên
22	DF	SRB	Filip Jović
23	DF	VIE	Trần Trọng Hiếu
24	MF	VIE	Phan Văn Hiếu
25	GK	VIE	Phạm Hữu Nghĩa
27	MF	VIE	Đoàn Hải Quân
30	MF	VIE	Nguyễn Đức Cường
66	FW	VIE	Hồ Tuấn Tài
68	DF	VIE	Bùi Tiến Dụng
77	MF	VIE	Sầm Ngọc Đức
91	FW	VIE	Lê Thanh Bình

=== Unregistred players ===
Note: Flags indicate national team as defined under FIFA eligibility rules; some limited exceptions apply. Players may hold more than one non-FIFA nationality.

No.	Pos.	Nation	Player
18	MF	VIE	Đàm Trọng Phúc
24	GK	VIE	Nguyễn Hoàng Đạt

No.	Pos.	Nation	Player
37	MF	VIE	Trần Đình Hùng
—	FW	VIE	Đặng Khánh Đăng

== Management and staff ==
As of 22 July 2025

Position	Name
Head coach	(Vietnam) Nguyễn Việt Thắng
Technical director	(Vietnam) Lê Phước Tứ
Assistant coach	(Vietnam) Hồ Hoàng Tiến (Vietnam) Nguyễn Quang Hải (Vietnam) Phan Văn Santos (Vietnam) Trương Đình Luật
Fitness coach	(Russia) Nikita Udovenko
Goalkeeper coach	(Vietnam) Ngô Việt Trung
Technical analyst	(Vietnam) Nguyễn Ngọc Hùng Quý
Doctor	(Vietnam) Lê Ngọc Hưng (Vietnam) Trần Công Định
Kit manager	(Vietnam) Nguyễn Thế Hưng

== Honours ==
=== National competitions ===
- V.League 2:

(gold) Champions: 2025–26
(silver) Runners-up: 2024–25
(bronze) Third place : 2017, 2019

== Notable players ==
- (Vietnam) Bùi Tấn Trường
- (Vietnam) Nguyễn Công Phượng
- (Vietnam) Nguyễn Hữu Tuấn
- (Vietnam) Trần Phi Sơn
- (Vietnam) Lương Xuân Trường

== Managerial history ==
- (Vietnam) Lê Trung Hậu (2013–14)
- (Vietnam) Lê Thanh Xuân (2015–2019)
- (Vietnam) Nguyễn Minh Phương (2019–2020)
- (Vietnam) Võ Quốc Huy (2020)
- (Vietnam) Văn Sỹ Sơn (2021)
- (Vietnam) Phan Công Lộc (2021)
- (Vietnam) Lê Thanh Xuân (2022–2023)
- (Vietnam) Nguyễn Anh Đức (2023–2025)
- (Vietnam) Huỳnh Quốc Anh (2025)
- (Vietnam) Nguyễn Việt Thắng (2025–present)

== Season by season record ==
Season	Pld	Won	Draw	Lost	GF	GA	GD	PTS	Final position	Notes
2015 V.League 2	14	4	3	7	19	25	−6	15	7th	
2016 V.League 2	18	4	4	10	29	36	-7	16	8th	
2017 V.League 2	12	6	1	5	11	12	-1	19	3rd	
2018 V.League 2	18	3	9	6	13	24	-11	18	8th	
2019 V.League 2	22	11	4	7	33	25	+8	37	3rd	
2020 V.League 2	16	5	3	8	12	18	−6	18	5th	
2021 V.League 2	6	1	3	2	6	8	−2	6	11th	The season was abandoned
2022 V.League 2	22	4	7	11	19	24	-5	19	10th	
2023 V.League 2	18	4	4	10	23	30	−7	16	10th	
2023–24 V.League 2	20	10	5	5	28	15	+13	35	3rd	
2024–25 V.League 2	20	13	5	2	33	15	+17	44	2nd	Defeated in V.League 1 promotion play-offs
2025–26 V.League 2	22	15	5	2	47	14	+34	50	1st	Promotion to V.League 1
2026–27 V.League 1	26									
