= SHB Da Nang =

SHB Đà Nẵng
- Logo (2008-2026 and 2026-now)
- Full name: Câu lạc bộ SHB Đà Nẵng; SHB Da Nang Football Club
- Nicknames: Đội bóng áo cam (The Orange), Đội bóng Sông Hàn (The team of Han River)
- Short name: SHBĐN
- Founded: 1976; 50 years ago (as Quảng Nam-Đà Nẵng F.C.)
- Ground: Chi Lăng Stadium
- Capacity: 20,500
- Owner: SHB Da Nang Sport J.S.C.
- Chairman: Vũ Nam Thắng
- Head coach: Lê Đức Tuấn
- League: V.League 1
- 2025–26: V.League 1, 12th of 14
- Website: shbdanangfc.com.vn
Home colours	Away colours

SHB Đà Nẵng Football Club (Vietnamese: Câu lạc bộ bóng đá SHB Đà Nẵng), simply known as SHB Đà Nẵng, is a Vietnamese professional football club based in Da Nang that plays in V.League 1, the top tier in Vietnamese football.

The club was formerly known as Quang Nam-Da Nang (Vietnamese: Câu lạc bộ Bóng đá Quảng Nam-Đà Nẵng) and won a Vietnamese National League title in 1992. In the 2007–08 season, the club was purchased by the Saigon-Hanoi Commercial Joint Stock Bank (SHB), the club name was changed to SHB Da Nang. The club won its first title in 2009, emerging as 2009 V-League champions and qualifying for the 2010 AFC Champions League. In the same year, they were also champions of the Vietnamese Cup. Adding to these victories, Danang's U-21 team also became champions in 2009 youth championships. The club were champions of the 2012 V-League season.

They currently play their home matches at Chi Lăng Stadium, a dedicated 20,500 capacity football-specific stadium that opened in 2016.

== History ==
The predecessor of Đà Nẵng Football Club was the Quang Nam-Đà Nẵng Workers' Football Club, then renamed the Quang Nam-Đà Nẵng Football Club. In the late 1980s and early 1990s, Quang Nam-Da Nang was a strong club, culminating in the national championship in 1992, and winning runner-up three times (1987, 1990, 1991). After that, Da Nang football said goodbye to a series of players and began to decline. In 1997, the team merged with the Đà Nẵng Water Supply Football Club to take the common name Da Nang. By 2001, Da Nang finished runner-up First Division 2000–01 and promoted to 2001-02 V.League.

Before the season V-League 2008, Đà Nẵng Football Club changed its name to SHB Đà Nẵng Football Club after the Department of Sports and Physical Training of Da Nang City transferred the team to SHB Bank.

A year later, a few days before the V-League 2009 kicked off, the club officially converted its operating model into a Sports Joint Stock Company. SHB Da Nang Sports Joint Stock Company officially launched on 2 February-year 2009. With an investment of over 55 billion VND, the season V-League 2009 was a successful season for SHB Đà Nẵng when they won a double national championship and 2009 Vietnamese Cup.

2012 continued to be a successful year for Da Nang football when they won the V-League for the third time after defeating Ninh Bình 3–1 and won the National Super Cup when winning 4–0 against Saigon Xuân Thành. Besides, SHB Da Nang's fan association also won the best fan association award in those two years.

The season 2015 was one of the worst seasons for coach Le Huynh Duc and his team when they only ranked 9th overall match, ranked right behind QNK Quang Nam. In addition, all of the club's youth teams failed and did not achieve any results. Previously, after failing to win in the first 5 rounds, there were doubts about the position of head coach Le Huynh Duc. This failure was acknowledged by the team's leadership as being due to lack of preparation and investment, poor selection of foreign players, as well as a lack of close attention to the youth ranks when deciding to drop two generations U-11 and U-13 for funding reasons.

Also this season, the club suffered a huge loss when former honorary chairman of the club Nguyen Ba Thanh died on 13 February 2015. To commemorate him, the entire team wore ribbons. funeral in the away match against Dong Tam Long An.

For the 2016 season, drawing lessons from the previous season, the club leaders and coaching staff were determined to change the team's blood. When bringing in quality names in the transfer market such as Thanh Hải from Long An, former captain of Hoang Anh Gia Lai Le Hoang Thien and former Vietnam Olympic National Team player Lâm Anh Quang from Nam Dinh. Right after the end of the 2015 season, SHB Da Nang quickly signed a contract with Mali striker Souleymane Diabate from Long An, but only after a few training sessions with the new club, this player had heart problems so the club decided to liquidate the contract ahead of time. As a replacement, the coaching staff invited back former 2011 V-League top scorer Gastón Merlo, in addition to signing a contract with Jamaican player Horace James from the Malaysian Super League and naturalized Brazilian player Dinh Van Ta. SHB Da Nang also had time to add an overseas Vietnamese player from the United States, Minh Alva Vu, but because he had not yet completed the procedures for naturalization in Vietnam, this player was registered in phase 2 of the season. Regarding the registration list for 2016 V.League 1, coach Le Huynh Duc was forced to eliminate two national U-23 players, Vo Huy Toan and Ho Ngoc Thang. This season, the club had a very impressive achievement when ranked third with 49 points, only 1 point behind the championship team and Gastón Merlo won the top scorer title for the 4th time with 24 goals. win, the highest in V.League history.

2018 was another failed season for the club, only winning 9th place, with 31 points after 26 rounds. Under the guidance of coach Nguyen Minh Phuong, the team plays very well at home but away from home only draws or loses. Therefore, after the end of the season, coach Nguyen Minh Phuong submitted his resignation and the team's board of directors decided to re-invite coach Le Huynh Duc to lead the team during this difficult period.

In 2019, the team's board of directors signed an agreement with Kamito Joint Stock Company from Japan, to sponsor soccer uniforms for the team. This is a huge mark in the professionalization of the club.

In 2020, in round 6 of the V.League at home, despite being scored first by Hoang Anh Gia Lai, the club fought back, winning with a score of 3–1. This is one of the rare teams to defeat HAGL at home since HAGL joined the V.League (2003) with 14 wins, 3 draws (2004, 2013, 2014) and 1 loss (2003).

In the 2023 V.League 1, the team did not perform well and had relegated to the V.League 2 after 22 years of playing in the top flight.

== Kit suppliers and shirt sponsors ==
Period	Kit manufacturer	Shirt sponsor
2008–2018	In-house	SHB
2019–2025	(Vietnam) Kamito	SHB
2025–	(Vietnam) Wika	SHB

== Players ==
=== First-team squad ===
As of 4 September 2026

Note: Flags indicate national team as defined under FIFA eligibility rules; some limited exceptions apply. Players may hold more than one non-FIFA nationality.

No.	Pos.	Nation	Player
2	DF	VIE	Trần Ngọc Hiệp
3	DF	URU	Matías Fracchia
5	MF	URU	Yvo Calleros
8	DF	VIE	Quế Ngọc Hải
9	FW	SRB	Ivan Šaponjić
10	MF	FRA	Kalvin Luong (on loan from Thép Xanh Nam Định)
11	FW	VIE	Phan Văn Long
14	MF	VIE	Trần Văn Hòa
16	MF	VIE	Phạm Văn Hữu
17	DF	VIE	Võ Hữu Việt Hoàng
18	FW	VIE	Phạm Đình Duy
19	MF	ARG	Joel López Pissano
20	DF	VIE	Lương Duy Cương
22	MF	VIE	Lê Vũ Quốc Nhật
23	DF	VIE	Nguyễn Hồng Phúc

No.	Pos.	Nation	Player
24	FW	VIE	Trần Trương Gia Phúc
26	MF	VIE	Võ Huy Toàn
27	MF	IRL	Bryan Ly
28	FW	VIE	Võ Nguyên Hoàng
32	MF	VIE	Lê Văn Quang Duyệt
33	GK	VIE	Đỗ Sỹ Huy
34	GK	VIE	Nguyễn Tiến Mạnh
36	FW	VIE	Nguyễn Minh Quang
37	DF	VIE	Vũ Văn Sơn (on loan from Hà Nội)
58	MF	VIE	Võ Văn Toàn
67	FW	VIE	Ngô Hồng Phước
72	MF	VIE	Nguyễn Trung Nguyên
79	DF	VIE	Mai Sỹ Hoàng (on loan from Hà Nội)
81	DF	VIE	Nguyễn Duy Thắng
91	GK	VIE	Bùi Tiến Dũng

=== Other players under contract ===
Note: Flags indicate national team as defined under FIFA eligibility rules; some limited exceptions apply. Players may hold more than one non-FIFA nationality.

No.	Pos.	Nation	Player
13	MF	VIE	Nguyễn Công Trịnh
25	GK	VIE	Huỳnh Trần Quốc Bảo
36	MF	VIE	Quách Công Đình
—	DF	VIE	Mai Quốc Tú

No.	Pos.	Nation	Player
—	MF	VIE	Lê Văn Đạt
—	MF	VIE	Nguyễn Thành Vinh
—	MF	VIE	Đỗ Thanh Hùng
—	MF	VIE	Võ Minh Đan

=== Out on loan ===
Note: Flags indicate national team as defined under FIFA eligibility rules; some limited exceptions apply. Players may hold more than one non-FIFA nationality.

No.	Pos.	Nation	Player
4	DF	VIE	Nguyễn Công Nhật (to Hà Nội until 1 July 2026)
68	DF	VIE	Nguyễn Thành Khải (to Quy Nhơn United until 1 July 2026)
77	GK	VIE	Hồ Tùng Hân (to Thanh Hóa until 1 July 2026)

No.	Pos.	Nation	Player
—	GK	VIE	Lâm Lê Phước Tiến Dũng (to Khatoco Khánh Hòa until 1 July 2026)
—	MF	VIE	Nguyễn Thanh Hùng (to Quy Nhơn United until 1 July 2026)
—	FW	VIE	Lê Anh Toàn (to Lâm Đồng until 1 July 2026)

=== Notable former players ===
- (Argentina) Nicolás Hernández
- (Argentina) Gastón Merlo
- (Brazil) Jose Almeida
- (Brazil) Lucão do Break
- (Brazil) Eydison
- (Brazil) Rogério Machado Pereira
- (France) Ludovic Casset
- (Hungary) Krisztián Timár
- (North Macedonia) Nikolce Klečkarovski
- (Poland) Mariusz Wysocki
- (Vietnam) Hà Minh Tuấn
- (Vietnam) Huỳnh Quốc Anh
- (Vietnam) Lê Quang Cường
- (Vietnam) Nguyễn Minh Phương
- (Vietnam) Nguyễn Thanh Bình
- (Vietnam) Phạm Nguyên Sa
- (Vietnam) Trần Đức Cường
- (Vietnam) Võ Hoàng Quảng
- (Vietnam) Võ Văn Hạnh

== Current coaching staff ==
Position	Name
Head coach	(South Korea) Lee Young-jin
Technical director	(Vietnam) Lê Đức Tuấn
Assistant coach	(Vietnam) Võ Phước (Vietnam) Trần Văn Thọ
Goalkeeping coach	(Vietnam) Nguyễn Văn Phụng
Fitness coach	(Korea) Lee Yong-kyu
Doctor	(Vietnam) Phạm Quốc Thắng (Vietnam) Lê Hữu Huy (Vietnam) Văn Công Vương
Interpreter	(Vietnam) Nguyễn Kim Hoàn

== Managerial history ==
As of 16 November 2026

Name	Nat	Period	Honours
Nguyễn Văn Rô	(Vietnam)	1976–19??	1976 Trường Sơn League
Lê Đình Chính	(Vietnam)	19??–1986	
Vũ Văn Tư	(Vietnam)	1987–1992	1992 V-League
Trần Vũ	(Vietnam)	1992–1993	1993 Vietnamese Cup
Thái Long	(Vietnam)	1994–1995	
Nguyễn Văn Vinh	(Vietnam)	1995–1997	1997 Second Division
Trần Vũ	(Vietnam)	1998–2001	
Jerzy Masztaler	(Poland)	2001–2002	
Ken Morton	(England)	2003–2004	
Gary Phillips	(Australia)	2004	
Lê Thụy Hải	(Vietnam)	2005	
Trần Vũ	(Vietnam)	2006–2007	
Phan Thanh Hùng	(Vietnam)	2007–2008	
Lê Huỳnh Đức	(Vietnam)	2008–2017	2009 V-League; 2009 Vietnamese Cup; 2012 V-League; 2012 Vietnamese Super Cup
Nguyễn Minh Phương	(Vietnam)	2018	
Lê Huỳnh Đức	(Vietnam)	2019–2021	
Phan Thanh Hùng	(Vietnam)	2021–2023	
Phạm Minh Đức	(Vietnam)	2023	
Trương Việt Hoàng	(Vietnam)	2023–2024	2023–24 V.League 2
Đào Quang Hùng	(Vietnam)	2024	
Cristiano Roland	(Brazil)	2024–2025	
Phan Thanh Hùng	(Vietnam)	2025	
Lê Đức Tuấn	(Vietnam)	2025–2026	
Lee Young-jin	(South Korea)	2026–	

== Honours ==
=== National competitions ===
League

- V.League 1:

(gold) Winners: 1992, 2009, 2012
(silver) Runners-up: 1987–88, 1990, 1991, 2005, 2013

- V.League 2:

(gold) Winners: 1997, 2023–24
(silver) Runners-up: 2000–01
Cup

- Vietnamese Super Cup:

(gold) Winners: 2012
(silver) Runners-up: 2009

- Vietnamese Cup:

(gold) Winners: 1993, 2009
(silver) Runners-up: 2013

=== Other competitions ===
- BTV Cup:

(gold) Winners: 2008

- Thiên Long Cup:

(gold) Winners: 2021

== Continental and regional record ==
=== Continental ===
Season	Competition	Round	Club	Home	Away	Aggregate
1992–93	Asian Cup Winners' Cup	First round	(Singapore) Balestier United	(w/o)^{1}		
1992–93	Asian Cup Winners' Cup	Intermediate Round	(Bangladesh) Mohammedan	1–0	1–1	2–1
1992–93	Asian Cup Winners' Cup	Semi-finals	(Japan) Nissan	1–1	0–3	1–4
1993–94	Asian Club Championship	Preliminary round	(Indonesia) Arema Malang	1–0	2–1	1–3
1994–95	Asian Cup Winners' Cup	Second round	Telephone Org. Thailand	0–3	2–5	
2006	AFC Champions League	Group E	(China) Dalian Shide	0–2	0–1	4th
2006	AFC Champions League	Group E	(Japan) Gamba Osaka	1–5	0–15	4th
2006	AFC Champions League	Group E	(South Korea) Jeonbuk Hyundai Motors	0–1	0–3	4th
2010	AFC Champions League	Qualifying play-off	(Thailand) Muangthong United	0–3		
2010	AFC Cup	Group H	(Thailand) Thai Port	0–0	3–2	1st
2010	AFC Cup	Group H	(Singapore) Geylang United	3–2	1–1	1st
2010	AFC Cup	Group H	(Hong Kong) Tai Po	3–0	2–1	1st
2010	AFC Cup	Round of 16	(Vietnam) Bình Dương	4–3 (a.e.t.)		
2010	AFC Cup	Quarter-finals	(Bahrain) Al-Riffa	3–5	3–0	3–8
2013	AFC Cup	Group G	(Myanmar) Ayeyawady United	2–1	3–2	2nd
2013	AFC Cup	Group G	(Maldives) Maziya	3–1	3–2	2nd
2013	AFC Cup	Group G	(Malaysia) Kelantan	0–1	0–5	2nd
2013	AFC Cup	Round of 16	(Indonesia) Semen Padang	1–2		

^{1} Balestier withdrew

=== Regional ===
Season	Competition	Round	Club	Home	Away	Aggregate
2016	Mekong Club Championship	First round	(Laos) Lanexang United	1–2		3rd
2016	Mekong Club Championship	First round	(Myanmar) Yadanarbon	2–2		3rd

== Season-by-season record ==
Season	Pld	Won	Draw	Lost	GF	GA	GD	PTS	Final position	Notes
1984 V-League	10	2	6	2	6	7	−1	10	5th	Group stage
1985 V-League	10	2	3	5	6	14	−8	7	6th	Group stage
1986 V-League	10	4	5	1	11	5	+6	11	3rd	Group stage
1987–88 V-League	22	12	4	6	33	22	+11	22	2nd	
1989 V-League	9	3	6	0	12	7	+4	12	1st	Group stage did not attend the play-off round because of the accident
1990 V-League									2nd	
1991 V-League									2nd	
1992 V-League									Champions	Qualified for 1992–93 Asian Cup Winners' Cup
1993–94 V-League	10	4	1	5	14	14	0	13		Qualified for 1993–94 Asian Club Championship
1995 V-League	12	3	0	9	12	16	−4	6	7th	Group stage Qualified for 1994–95 Asian Cup Winners' Cup
1996										
1997										
1998										
1999–2000 V-League	24	6	9	9	23	30	−7	27	11th	Relegation to 2001 First League
2001 First League	22	12	8	2	40	16	+24	44	2nd	Promoted to 2001–02 V-League
2001–02 V-League	18	6	6	6	14	14	+0	24	6th	
2003 V-League	22	8	3	11	24	29	−3	27	10th	
2004 V-League	22	5	9	8	27	28	−1	24	9th	
2005 V-League	22	10	8	4	33	19	+14	38	2nd	Qualified for 2006 AFC Champions League
2006 V-League	24	9	7	8	32	27	+5	34	7th	
2007 V-League	26	9	10	7	33	28	+5	37	5th	
2008 V-League	26	12	6	8	43	33	+10	42	4th	
2009 V-League	26	15	5	6	48	30	+18	50	Champions	Qualified for 2010 AFC Champions League qualifying play-off
2010 V-League	26	12	4	10	41	44	−3	40	6th	
2011 V-League	26	12	8	6	49	32	+17	44	3rd	
2012 V-League	26	14	6	6	47	31	+16	48	Champions	Qualified for 2013 AFC Cup
2013 V.League 1	20	10	5	5	29	24	+5	35	2nd	
2014 V.League 1	22	11	6	5	43	33	+10	39	4th	
2015 V.League 1	26	10	6	10	42	32	+10	36	9th	
2016 V.League 1	26	15	4	7	49	33	+16	49	3rd	Qualified for 2016 Mekong Club Championship
2017 V.League 1	26	8	9	9	36	34	+2	33	9th	
2018 V.League 1	26	8	7	11	38	49	−11	31	9th	
2019 V.League 1	26	9	6	11	38	38	0	33	10th	
2020 V.League 1	18	5	8	5	26	22	+4	23	9th	
2021 V.League 1	12	5	1	6	11	11	0	16	9th	League was cancelled due to COVID-19
2022 V.League 1	24	6	7	11	18	35	−17	25	10th	
2023 V.League 1	18	2	8	8	11	19	−8	14	14th	Relegated to V.League 2
2023–24 V.League 2	20	13	5	2	37	10	+27	44	Champions	Promoted to V.League 1
2024–25 V.League 1	26	5	10	11	24	42	−18	25	13th	
2025–26 V.League 1	26	5	9	12	33	39	−6	24	12th	

== Reserves team ==
SHB Da Nang B
- Full name: SHB Da Nang B Football Club; Câu lạc bộ bóng đá Trẻ SHB Đà Nẵng
- Founded: 2018; 8 years ago
- Ground: Tam Kỳ Stadium
- Capacity: 15,000
- Manager: Huỳnh Quốc Anh
- League: Vietnamese Second Division
- 2026: Vietnamese Second Division, 6th of 7 (Group A)
- Website: Website
Home colours	Away colours

The reserves team of SHB Da Nang currently competes at the Vietnamese Football League Second Division.

The club currently plays its home matches at the 15-000 capacity Tam Kỳ Stadium. Before 2026, the team's home stadium was Quân Khu 5 with 12-000 capacity.

As of 10 April 2025

Position	Name
Head coach	(Vietnam) Huỳnh Quốc Anh

Note: Flags indicate national team as defined under FIFA eligibility rules; some limited exceptions apply. Players may hold more than one non-FIFA nationality.

No.	Pos.	Nation	Player
2	DF	VIE	Bùi Anh Nhật
3	DF	VIE	Nguyễn Công Trịnh
4	DF	VIE	Nguyễn Minh Tuấn
7	MF	VIE	Trần Văn Quang Huy
8	MF	VIE	Nguyễn Hoàng Nhân
9	FW	VIE	Ngô Duy
10	MF	VIE	Lê Nguyễn Văn Thọ
11	MF	VIE	Nguyễn Công Tuấn Anh
12	MF	VIE	Hoàng Minh Tâm
13	MF	VIE	Nguyễn Minh Trọng
15	MF	VIE	Nguyễn Văn Hoành
16	MF	VIE	Huỳnh Thanh Hải
17	MF	VIE	Võ Văn Sơn
18	FW	VIE	Nguyễn Văn Nam
19	MF	VIE	Nguyễn Minh Hiếu
20	DF	VIE	Võ Văn Tiến
21	FW	VIE	Phan Thanh Đức Thiện
22	MF	VIE	Huỳnh Lê Lộc
24	FW	VIE	Huỳnh Minh Anh

No.	Pos.	Nation	Player
26	GK	VIE	Phùng Hữu Đức
27	MF	VIE	Nguyễn Thanh Nhân
28	GK	VIE	Lê Nguyễn Viết Lâm
43	DF	VIE	Nguyễn Ngọc Hoan
49	MF	VIE	Võ Huy Thắng
71	DF	VIE	Nguyễn Văn Lĩnh
74	MF	VIE	Đào Văn Lượng
77	DF	VIE	Nguyễn Công Vi Nhân
92	MF	VIE	Huỳnh Văn Danh
99	DF	VIE	Võ Tuấn Tài
—	GK	VIE	Hồ Tùng Hân
—	DF	VIE	Hoàng Việt Anh
—	DF	VIE	Lê Đức An
—	DF	VIE	Nguyễn Thành Khải
—	DF	VIE	Phùng Bá Đức Anh
—	MF	VIE	Hồ Văn Bình
—	MF	VIE	Nguyễn Thành Vinh
—	MF	VIE	Trương Thoại Khoa
—	FW	VIE	Nguyễn Văn Chánh Quyên
