= 2022 V.League 2 =

- Logo used in 2021 and 2022 season
- Season: 2022
- Dates: 4 March – 29 October 2022
- Champions: Cong An Nhan Dan
- Promoted: Cong An Nhan Dan; Khanh Hoa
- Relegated: Daklak
- Matches: 135
- Goals: 323 (2.39 per match)
- Top goalscorer: Nguyen Thanh Nhan (10 goals)
- Biggest home win: Long An 6–2 Phu Dong (4 September)
- Biggest away win: Phu Dong 1–5 Pho Hien (4 April)
- Highest scoring: Long An 6–2 Phu Dong (4 September)
- Longest winning run: 4 games Pho Hien
- Longest unbeaten run: 16 games Khanh Hoa
- Longest winless run: 13 games Binh Phuoc
- Longest losing run: 6 games Phu Dong
- Highest attendance: 3,500; Khanh Hoa 1–0 Ba Ria Vung Tau (31 July)
- Lowest attendance: 150; Phu Tho 2–0 Hue (1 October)
- Total attendance: 171,050
- Average attendance: 1,358 (excluding matches played behind closed doors)

The 2022 V.League 2, known as the LS V.League 2 (Vietnamese: Giải bóng đá Hạng Nhất Quốc gia LS 2022) for sponsorship reasons, was the 28th season of V.League 2, Vietnam's second tier professional football league. The season started on 5 March 2022.

== Changes from the previous season ==
All 13 teams from the 2021 season were expected to return as no teams were promoted or relegated from the previous season due to the COVID-19 pandemic. However, An Giang withdrew after being unable to secure a financial sponsor for the season.

=== From V.League 2 ===
Dissolved

- ~~An Giang~~

== Clubs ==
Locations of the 2022 V.League 2 teams

=== Stadium and locations ===
Team	Location	Stadium	Capacity
Ba Ria Vung Tau FC	Ba Ria–Vung Tau	Ba Ria	8,000
Binh Phuoc FC	Binh Phuoc	Binh Phuoc	10,000
Can Tho FC	Cantho	Cantho	30,000
Daklak FC	Daklak	Buon Ma Thuot	25,000
Phu Dong	Hanoi	Thanh Tri	4,000
Pho Hien FC	Hung Yen	PVF	4,500
Khanh Hoa FC	Khanh Hoa	19/8	18,000
Long An FC	Long An	Long An	20,000
Cong An Nhan Dan	Ninh Binh	Ninh Binh	18,000
Phu Tho FC	Phu Tho	Viet Tri	18,000
Quang Nam FC	Quang Nam	Tam Ky	15,000
Hue FC	Thua Thien Hue	Tu Do	16,000

=== Personnel and kits ===
Team	Manager	Captain	Kit manufacturer	Shirt sponsor
Ba Ria Vung Tau FC	(Vietnam) Nguyen Minh Phuong	(Vietnam) Phan Thanh Hau	(Vietnam) Masu	(Thailand) SCG
Binh Phuoc FC	(Vietnam) Le Thanh Xuan	(Vietnam) Huynh Van Ly	Made by club	
Can Tho FC	(Vietnam) Hoang Hai Duong (interim)	(Vietnam) Nguyen Thanh Hai	(Thailand) Grand Sport	(Vietnam) Bamboo Airways
Daklak	(Vietnam) Vo Thanh Luan	(Vietnam) Danh Luong Thuc	(Vietnam) Demenino Sport	
Phu Dong	(Vietnam) Nguyen Trung Kien	(Vietnam) Le Quang Dai	(Vietnam) Kamito	(Japan) Mitsubishi Motors
Pho Hien FC	(Portugal) Mauro Jerónimo	(Vietnam) Nguyen Xuan Duong	(Vietnam) Kamito	(Vietnam) Văn Lang University
Khanh Hoa FC	(Vietnam) Vo Dinh Tan	(Vietnam) Le Tan Tai	(Vietnam) Kamito	
Long An FC	(Vietnam) Phan Van Giau	(Vietnam) Nguyen Anh Duc	Made by club	(Vietnam) Dong Tam Group (Vietnam) Cang Long An
Cong An Nhan Dan	(Vietnam) Thach Bao Khanh	(Vietnam) Tran Thanh Son	(Vietnam) Jogarbola	(Vietnam) The Vissai Group (Vietnam) Bolaven Banana
Phu Tho FC	(Vietnam) Vu Nhu Thanh	(Vietnam) Ho Ngoc Thang	(Vietnam) HP Sport	
Quang Nam FC	(Vietnam) Van Sy Son	(Vietnam) Ha Minh Tuan	(Vietnam) Kamito	
Hue FC	(Vietnam) Nguyen Duc Dung	(Vietnam) Nguyen Tien Tao	Made by club	

=== Managerial changes ===
Team	Outgoing manager	Manner of departure	Date of vacancy	Position in table	Incoming manager	Date of appointment
Binh Phuoc FC	(Vietnam) Van Sy Son	Mutual consent	May 2021	Pre-season	(Vietnam) Pham Cong Loc	March 2022
Daklak FC	(Vietnam) Truong Minh Tien	Mutual consent	May 2021	Pre-season	(Vietnam) Vo Thanh Luan	March 2022
Ba Ria Vung Tau FC	(Vietnam) Tran Minh Chien	Mutual consent	21 October 2021	Pre-season	(Vietnam) Nguyen Minh Phuong	8 November 2021
Pho Hien FC	(Vietnam) Hua Hien Vinh	Resigned	2 December 2021	Pre-season	(Portugal) Mauro Jerónimo	January 2022
Can Tho FC	(Vietnam) Nguyen Huu Dang	Mutual consent	February 2022	Pre-season	(Vietnam) Nguyen Viet Thang	18 February 2022
Cong An Nhan Dan	(Vietnam) Vu Quang Bao	Resigned	May 2022	2nd	(Vietnam) Thach Bao Khanh	3 May 2022
Quang Nam FC	(Vietnam) Duong Hong Son	Resigned	1 August 2022	6th	(Vietnam) Van Sy Son	1 August 2022
Binh Phuoc FC	(Vietnam) Hoang Tho	Resigned	14 August 2022	12th	(Vietnam) Le Thanh Xuan	14 August 2022
Can Tho FC	(Vietnam) Nguyen Viet Thang	Resigned	14 September 2022	8th	(Vietnam) Nguyen Thanh Tu (caretaker)	20 September 2022
Can Tho FC	(Vietnam) Nguyen Thanh Tu	Caretaker period over	4 October 2022	10th	(Vietnam) Hoang Hai Duong (interim)	4 October 2022

== League table ==
Pos	Team	Pld	W	D	L	GF	GA	GD	Pts	Promotion or relegation
1	Cong An Nhan Dan (C, P)	22	12	7	3	37	15	+22	43	Promotion to V.League 1
2	Khanh Hoa (P)	22	11	9	2	30	16	+14	42	Promotion to V.League 1
3	Quang Nam	22	12	4	6	30	22	+8	40	
4	Ba Ria Vung Tau	22	10	8	4	30	19	+11	38 (Note: Head-to-head points: Ba Ria Vung Tau 4, Pho Hien 1.)	
5	Pho Hien	22	10	8	4	40	22	+18	38	
6	Long An	22	8	8	6	36	28	+8	32	
7	Hue	22	6	7	9	20	31	−11	25	
8	Can Tho	22	6	5	11	25	40	−15	23	
9	Phu Tho	22	5	6	11	19	32	−13	21	
10	Binh Phuoc	22	4	7	11	19	24	−5	19	
11	Phu Dong	22	5	3	14	21	44	−23	18 (Note: Head-to-head points: Phu Dong 3, Daklak 3. Head-to-head goal difference: Phu Dong +1, Daklak -1.)	
12	Daklak (R)	22	4	6	12	18	32	−14	18	Relegation to Vietnamese League Two

Source: VPF
Rules for classification: 1) Points; 2) Head-to-head points; 3) Head-to-head goal difference; 4) Head-to-head goals scored; 5) Goal difference; 6) Goals scored.
(C) Champions; (P) Promoted; (R) Relegated

== Results ==
Home \ Away	BRV	BIN	CTC	CND	DLK	HUE	KHA	LAN	PHO	PHD	PHT	QNA
Ba Ria Vung Tau		1–1	0–0	2–1	0–0	0–1	1–1	3–2	1–1	4–1	1–0	0–1
Binh Phuoc	0–2		3–1	0–0	1–0	1–1	0–1	1–0	1–1	0–1	1–2	1–2
Can Tho	0–1	0–0		0–1	2–1	3–0	0–1	1–6	1–4	2–1	2–2	2–4
Cong An Nhan Dan	1–1	2–0	5–1		3–1	3–0	0–0	0–0	2–1	1–3	2–0	2–0
Daklak	0–2	2–1	1–1	0–2		1–2	0–1	3–1	0–0	1–3	2–2	0–0
Hue	1–2 (Note: Postponed due to Typhoon Noru.)	1–1	1–1	2–1	1–3		1–1	1–1	1–0	0–0	1–0	0–1
Khanh Hoa	1–0	1–0	3–1	1–1	2–0	2–2		2–0	0–1	1–2	1–0	1–1
Long An	2–3	3–2	2–1	0–0	1–0	3–1	2–2		0–0	6–2	1–1	3–2
Pho Hien	1–3	0–0	2–1	2–2	3–1	3–0	3–3	1–2		2–1	1–1	1–0
Phu Dong	0–0	0–4	0–1	1–2	0–1	1–3	0–3	1–1	1–5		1–2	1–3
Phu Tho	2–2	1–0	1–2	0–4	1–1	2–0	1–2	1–0	0–3	0–1		0–1
Quang Nam	2–1	2–1	1–2	0–2	3–0	1–0	0–0	0–0	1–5	2–0	3–0	

Source: vpf.vn
Legend: Blue = home team win; Yellow = draw; Red = away team win.

== Season statistics ==
As of 29 October 2022

=== Top scorers ===
Rank	Player	Club	Goals
1	(Vietnam) Nguyen Thanh Nhan	Pho Hien	10
2	(Vietnam) Le Thanh Binh	Khanh Hoa	9
3	(Vietnam) Nguyen Van Thanh	Ba Ria Vung Tau	8
4	(Vietnam) Dinh Thanh Binh	Cong An Nhan Dan	7
4	(Vietnam) Duong Van An	Can Tho	7
4	(Vietnam) Le Minh Binh	Cong An Nhan Dan	7
7	(Vietnam) Bui Anh Thong	Phu Dong	6
7	(Vietnam) Ho Ngoc Thang	Phu Tho	6
7	(Vietnam) Phan Tan Tai	Long An	6
10	8 players		5

Source: Soccerway

==== Hat-tricks ====
Player	For	Against	Result	Date
(Vietnam) Tran Ngoc Phuong	Long An	Phu Dong	6–2 (H)	4 September 2022
(Vietnam) Phan Tan Tai	Long An	Can Tho	6–1 (A)	23 September 2022

=== Clean sheets ===
Rank	Player	Club	Clean sheets
1	(Vietnam) Do Sy Huy	Cong An Nhan Dan	9
2	(Vietnam) Tong Duc An	Quang Nam	8
3	(Vietnam) Pham Huu Nghia	Pho Hien	7
4	(Vietnam) Nguyen Thanh Tuan	Ba Ria Vung Tau	6
4	(Vietnam) Vo Ngoc Cuong	Khanh Hoa	6
6	(Vietnam) Dang Ngoc Tuan	Can Tho	4
6	(Vietnam) Nguyen Tien Tao	Hue	4
6	(Vietnam) Pham Tran Thanh Vu	Binh Phuoc	4
6	(Vietnam) Tran The Kiet	Khanh Hoa	4
10	4 players		3

== Awards ==
=== Annual awards ===
Award	Winner	Club
Player of the Year	(Vietnam) Le Thanh Binh	Khanh Hoa FC

== Attendances to stadium ==
Pos	Team	Total	High	Low	Average	Change
1	Khanh Hoa FC	33,200	7,000	1,000	3,018	+212.4%
2	Ba Ria Vung Tau	21,500	3,000	1,000	1,954	+17.3%
3	Quang Nam FC	20,200	3,000	1,000	1,836	+4.0%
4	Cong An Nhan Dan	16,400	3,500	700	1,490	+129.2%
5	Hue FC	16,000	2,500	400	1,454	−12.7%
6	Binh Phuoc FC	13,200	3,000	300	1,200	+20.0%
7	Daklak FC	11,900	3,000	300	1,081	+29.8%
8	Long An FC	10,300	1,500	400	936	+7.0%
9	Pho Hien	9,500	2,000	500	863	+159.2%
10	Can Tho FC	9,400	3,000	200	854	+13.9%
11	Phu Tho FC	5,350	1,000	150	486	−81.8%
12	Phu Dong	4,200	1,000	200	381	−12.0%
	League total	171,150	7,000	150	1,296	n/a
