= Phạm Gia Hưng =

Vietnamese footballer

Personal information
- Full name: Phạm Gia Hưng
- Date of birth: 26 April 2000 (age 26)
- Place of birth: Đắk Lắk, Vietnam
- Height: 1.81 m (5 ft 11 in)
- Position: Striker

Team information
- Current team: Ninh Bình
- Number: 18

Youth career
- –2016: PVF
- 2016–2020: Đắk Lắk

Senior career*
Years	Team	Apps	(Gls)
2020–2022	Đắk Lắk	23	(5)
2020	→ Kon Tum (loan)	11	(4)
2023–2024	Công An Hà Nội	9	(0)
2023	→ PVF-CAND (loan)	4	(0)
2025–	Ninh Bình	37	(11)

International career^{‡}
2025–	Vietnam	6	(0)
- * Club domestic league appearances and goals as of 17 October 2026 ‡ National team caps and goals as of 7 August 2026

Phạm Gia Hưng (born 26 April 2000) is a Vietnamese professional footballer who is a striker for V.League 1 club Ninh Bình and the Vietnam national team.

== Club career ==
Gia Hưng was born in Đắk Lắk. He made his senior debut with Kon Tum at the 2020 Vietnamese Second League. He then returned to Đắk Lắk and played two seasons in the V.League 2.

In January 2023, Gia Hưng moved to newly promoted V.League 1 club Công An Hà Nội. He scored in his V.League 1 debut in a 3–1 win against Khánh Hòa on 2 April 2023. Three months after, in July 2023, he was loaned to V.League 2 club PVF-CAND.

In September 2024, Gia Hưng was transferred to Phù Đổng Ninh Bình in the V.League 2. He finished as the third best goalscorer in the 2024–25 V.League 2 with 6 goals, as Phù Đổng Ninh Bình eventually won the league.

== International career ==
In August 2025, Gia Hưng received his first call up to the Vietnam national team for an internal training camp. On 9 October 2025, he made his international debut in Vietnam's 3–1 win against Nepal, as part of the 2027 Asian Cup qualifiers.

== Career statistics ==
=== Club ===
As of match played 18 October 2026

Appearances and goals by club, season and competition
Club	Season	League			National cup		Other		Total	
Club	Season	Division	Apps	Goals	Apps	Goals	Apps	Goals	Apps	Goals
Kon Tum (loan)	2020	Second Division	11	4	—		—		11	4
Đắk Lắk	2021	V.League 2	5	1	1	0	—		6	1
Đắk Lắk	2022	V.League 2	18	4	1	1	—		19	5
Đắk Lắk	Total		23	5	2	1	0	0	25	6
Công An Hà Nội	2023	V.League 1	0	0	1	1	—		1	1
Công An Hà Nội	2023–24	V.League 1	9	0	2	0	1 (Note: Appearances in the Vietnamese Super Cup)	0	12	0
Công An Hà Nội	Total		9	0	3	1	1	0	13	1
PVF-CAND (loan)	2023	V.League 2	4	0	2	1	—		6	1
Ninh Bình	2024–25	V.League 2	14	6	2	0	—		16	6
Ninh Bình	2025–26	V.League 1	22	5	5	2	—		27	7
Ninh Bình	2026–27	V.League 1	1	0	0	0	—		1	0
Ninh Bình	Total		37	11	7	2	0	0	44	13
Career total			84	20	14	5	1	0	99	25

=== International ===
As of match played 7 August 2026

Appearances and goals by national team and year
National team	Year	Apps	Goals
Vietnam	2025	3	0
Vietnam	2026	3	0
Total		6	0

== Honours ==
Công An Hà Nội

- V.League 1: 2023

Ninh Bình

- V.League 2: 2024–25

Vietnam

- ASEAN Championship: 2026
