= 2024–25 V.League 2 =

V.League 2
- Season: 2024–25
- Dates: 26 October 2024 – 21 June 2025
- Champions: Phu Dong Ninh Binh (1st title)
- Promoted: Phu Dong Ninh Binh; PVF-CAND
- Relegated: Hue
- Matches: 110
- Goals: 214 (1.95 per match)
- Top goalscorer: Lưu Tự Nhân (9 goals)
- Biggest home win: Phu Dong Ninh Binh 5–0 Ba Ria-Vung Tau (6 April 2025)
- Biggest away win: 4 games
- Highest scoring: Hoa Binh 2–4 PVF-CAND (13 April 2025)
- Longest winning run: 13 wins Phu Dong Ninh Binh
- Longest unbeaten run: 20 matches Phu Dong Ninh Binh
- Longest winless run: 8 matches Dong Nai
- Longest losing run: 3 losses Dong Nai
- Highest attendance: 12,000; Phu Dong Ninh Binh 3–1 Truong Tuoi Binh Phuoc (14 June 2025)
- Lowest attendance: 300; HCMC Youth 0–0 Dong Nai (27 April 2025)
- Attendance: 275,800 (2,507 per match)

The 2024–25 V.League 2, known as the Gold Star V.League 2 (Vietnamese: Giải bóng đá Hạng Nhất Quốc gia Bia Sao Vàng 2024–25) for sponsorship reasons, was the 31st season of V.League 2, Vietnam's second tier professional football league. The season was scheduled to began on 26 October 2024 and concluded on 21 June 2025.

There was a break from 8 December 2024 to 5 January 2025 for the 2024 ASEAN Championship.

Like the previous season, teams won't be allowed to register any foreign players, but will be allotted two non-naturalized Vietnamese player slots.

== Team changes ==
The following teams have changed division compared the 2023–24 season:

Promoted from 2024 Second Division	Relegated from 2023–24 V.League 1	Promoted to 2024–25 V.League 1	Relegated to 2025 Second Division	Not engaged
Ho Chi Minh City Youth; ~~Dinh Huong Phu Nhuan~~	Khanh Hoa	SHB Da Nang	Phu Tho	Dinh Huong Phu Nhuan

Dinh Huong Phu Nhuan had folded due to financial difficulties before the start of the championship, thus changing the number of teams from 12 to 11

=== Name changes ===
On 4 October 2024, Khanh Hoa FC changed their name to Khatoco Khanh Hoa FC.

== Participating clubs by province ==
Locations of the 2024–25 V.League 2 teams

Team	Location	Stadium	Capacity	Previous season rank
Ba Ria-Vung Tau FC	Ba Ria-Vung Tau	Bà Rịa	10,000	VL2 (7th)
Dong Nai FC	Dong Nai	Đồng Nai	30,000	VL2 (9th)
Dong Thap FC	Dong Thap	Cao Lanh	23,000	VL2 (10th)
Ho Chi Minh City Youth	Ho Chi Minh City	Thong Nhat	15,000	SD (playoffs)
Hoa Binh FC	Hoa Binh	Hoa Binh	3,600	VL2 (8th)
Hue FC	Hue	Tu Do	25,000	VL2 (4th)
Khatoco Khanh Hoa	Khanh Hoa	19 August	18,000	VL1 (14th)
Long An FC	Long An	Long An	20,000	VL2 (6th)
Phu Dong Ninh Binh	Ninh Binh	Ninh Binh	22,000	VL2 (5th)
PVF-CAND	Hung Yen	PVF	4,500	VL2 (2nd)
Truong Tuoi Binh Phuoc	Binh Phuoc	Bình Phước	11,000	VL2 (3rd)

=== Number of teams by region ===
Number	Region	Team(s)
4	Southeast	Ba Ria Vung Tau, Dong Nai, Ho Chi Minh City Youth, Truong Tuoi Binh Phuoc
2	Red River Delta	PVF-CAND, Phu Dong Ninh Binh
2	Mekong River Delta	Dong Thap, Long An
1	Northwest	Hoa Binh
1	North Central	Hue
1	South Central	Khatoco Khanh Hoa

== Personnel and kits ==
Team	Manager	Captain	Kit manufacturer	Shirt sponsor
Ba Ria-Vung Tau	(Vietnam) Nguyễn Minh Phương	(Vietnam) Tô Phương Thịnh	(Vietnam) Wika	(Vietnam) Long Son Petrochemicals (Thailand) SCG
Dong Nai	(Vietnam) Ngô Quang Sang	(Vietnam) Nguyễn Thái Sơn	(Vietnam) Demenino Sport	(Vietnam) LPBank
Dong Thap	(Vietnam) Phan Thanh Bình	(Vietnam) Trần Hữu Thắng	(Vietnam) Bulbal	(Vietnam) Van Hien University (Vietnam) Happy Foods (Vietnam) Binh Minh Saigon High School (Vietnam) Ochao
Ho Chi Minh City Youth	(Vietnam) Trần Duy Quang	(Vietnam) Dương Văn Cường	(Vietnam) Wika	(Vietnam) LPBank (Vietnam) ThaiGroup
Hoa Binh	(Vietnam) Lê Quốc Vượng	(Vietnam) Trần Gia Huy	(Vietnam) Kamito	(China) Roerdum Watch (Vietnam) LPBank
Hue	(Vietnam) Nguyễn Đức Dũng	(Vietnam) Lê Viết Hiếu	(Vietnam) CR Sports	
Khatoco Khanh Hoa	(Vietnam) Trần Trọng Bình	(Vietnam) Võ Ngọc Cường	(Vietnam) Kamito	(Vietnam) Khatoco
Long An	(Vietnam) Trịnh Duy Quang	(Vietnam) Võ Hoàng Uy	(Vietnam) Kamito	(Vietnam) LPBank
Phu Dong Ninh Binh	(Vietnam) Nguyễn Việt Thắng	(Vietnam) Nguyễn Hoàng Đức	(Vietnam) Vloop	(Vietnam) LPBank
PVF-CAND	(Vietnam) Thạch Bảo Khanh	(Vietnam) Nguyễn Huy Hùng	(Japan) Jogarbola	
Truong Tuoi Binh Phuoc	(Vietnam) Huỳnh Quốc Anh (interim)	(Vietnam) Bùi Tấn Trường	(Spain) Kelme	(Vietnam) Truong Tuoi Group

=== Managerial changes ===
Team	Outgoing manager	Manner of departure	Date of vacancy	Position in table	Incoming manager	Date of appointment
Hoa Binh	(Vietnam) Hồ Thanh Thưởng	Mutual consent	17 July 2024	Pre-season	(Vietnam) Lê Quốc Vượng	27 July 2024
Ho Chi Minh City Youth	(Vietnam) Lư Đình Tuấn	Mutual consent	19 July 2024	Pre-season	(Vietnam) Nguyễn Việt Thắng	19 July 2024
Phu Dong Ninh Binh	(Vietnam) Nguyễn Văn Đàn	Mutual consent	23 July 2024	Pre-season	(Vietnam) Trần Duy Quang	30 July 2024
Ho Chi Minh City Youth	(Vietnam) Nguyễn Việt Thắng	Move to Phu Dong Ninh Binh	9 September 2024	Pre-season	(Vietnam) Trần Duy Quang	9 September 2024
Phu Dong Ninh Binh	(Vietnam) Trần Duy Quang	Move to Ho Chi Minh City Youth	9 September 2024	Pre-season	(Vietnam) Nguyễn Việt Thắng	9 September 2024
Long An	(Vietnam) Ngô Quang Sang	Mutual consent	10 September 2024	Pre-season	(Vietnam) Trịnh Duy Quang	10 September 2024
Dong Thap	(Vietnam) Bùi Văn Đông	Mutual consent	3 October 2024	Pre-season	(Vietnam) Phan Thanh Bình	3 October 2024
Truong Tuoi Binh Phuoc	(Vietnam) Nguyễn Anh Đức	Mutual consent	1 March 2025	3rd	(Vietnam) Huỳnh Quốc Anh (interim)	2 March 2025
PVF-CAND	(Portugal) Mauro Jerónimo	Mutual consent	13 March 2025	3rd	(Vietnam) Thạch Bảo Khanh	24 March 2025
Dong Nai	(Vietnam) Bùi Hữu Thái Sơn	Mutual consent	15 April 2025	10th	(Vietnam) Ngô Quang Sang	15 April 2025

== Standings ==
=== League table ===
Pos	Team	Pld	W	D	L	GF	GA	GD	Pts	Promotion, qualification or relegation
1	Phu Dong Ninh Binh (C, P)	20	19	1	0	40	3	+37	58	Promotion to V.League 1
2	Truong Tuoi Binh Phuoc	20	13	5	2	30	13	+17	44	Qualification for promotion play-offs
3	PVF-CAND (Note: On 1 August 2025, Quang Nam confirmed their withdrawal from the 2025–26 V.League 1. Three days later, VPF confirmed that 2024–25 V.League 2's third placed team PVF-CAND will replace Quang Nam's slot, following Truong Tuoi Dong Nai's refusal to promote to the V.League 1.) (P)	20	13	4	3	29	12	+17	43	Promotion to V.League 1
4	Ho Chi Minh City Youth	20	5	8	7	15	21	−6	23	
5	Khatoco Khanh Hoa	20	5	6	9	16	25	−9	21	
6	Dong Thap	20	4	7	9	14	16	−2	19	
7	Hoa Binh (D)	20	3	10	7	15	20	−5	19	Dissolved
8	Long An	20	3	9	8	9	21	−12	18 (Note: Head-to-head points: Long An: 6 points, Dong Nai: 5 points, Ba Ria-Vung Tau: 4 points.)	
9	Dong Nai (R)	20	3	9	8	13	20	−7	18	Demoted to Vietnamese Third Division
10	Ba Ria-Vung Tau	20	5	3	12	17	33	−16	18	
11	Hue (R)	20	4	4	12	16	30	−14	16	Relegation to Vietnamese Second Division

Source: VPF
Rules for classification: 1) Points; 2) Head-to-head points; 3) Head-to-head goal difference; 4) Head-to-head goals scored; 5) Goal difference; 6) Goals scored; 7) Away goals scored; 8) Fair-play points.
(C) Champions; (D) Disqualified; (P) Promoted; (R) Relegated

=== Results ===
Home \ Away	BRV	DNA	DTH	HCY	HBH	HUE	KHA	LAN	PHD	PVF	TBP
Ba Ria-Vung Tau		4–1	0–2	3–1	1–0	1–1	1–1	0–0	0–2	0–1	0–3
Dong Nai	4–0		1–0	0–0	0–0	1–3	0–1	0–0	0–1	0–1	1–1
Dong Thap	0–1	0–0		0–0	1–0	3–0	1–2	2–0	1–2	0–1	0–1
Ho Chi Minh City Youth	1–0	0–0	2–2		1–1	2–0	3–1	2–1	0–3	0–0	0–1
Hoa Binh	2–0	2–2	0–0	1–1		1–0	0–0	0–0	1–1	2–4	0–0
Hue	2–3	0–1	1–1	1–0	0–1		2–2	0–0	0–2	0–3	0–1
Khatoco Khanh Hoa	2–1	2–1	0–0	2–0	1–1	0–2		0–1	0–1	0–1	0–2
Long An	1–0	0–0	1–1	0–0	2–1	1–2	1–1		0–2	0–0	1–2
Phu Dong Ninh Binh	5–0	1–0	1–0	3–0	2–0	2–1	2–0	2–0		1–0	3–0
PVF-CAND	1–0	3–0	1–0	0–2	2–1	3–0	3–1	3–0	0–3		0–0
Truong Tuoi Binh Phuoc	3–2	1–1	2–0	2–0	2–1	2–1	2–0	3–0	0–1	2–2	

Updated to match(es) played on 21 June 2025. Source: VPF
Legend: Blue = home team win; Yellow = draw; Red = away team win.

=== Position by round ===
Team ╲ Round	1	2	3	4	5	6	7	8	9	10	11	12	13	14	15	16	17	18	19	20	21	22
Ba Ria-Vung Tau	1	5	5	6	5	5	5	4	4	4	4	4	4	4	5	4	4	7	7	7	9	10
Dong Nai	11	11	11	11	11	11	11	11	11	11	11	11	11	10	8	7	8	5	5	6	7	9
Dong Thap	3	6	6	4	4	4	4	6	7	7	8	8	7	6	4	5	5	8	8	8	6	6
Ho Chi Minh City Youth	9	7	10	9	10	7	7	7	6	6	7	5	6	5	6	6	6	4	4	5	5	4
Hoa Binh	6	8	9	10	9	6	9	9	9	10	9	9	9	9	10	11	9	9	9	9	10	7
Hue	4	2	4	5	7	9	10	10	10	8	10	10	10	11	11	10	11	11	11	11	11	11
Khatoco Khanh Hoa	10	10	7	7	6	8	6	5	5	5	5	7	5	7	7	8	7	6	6	4	4	5
Long An	5	9	8	8	8	10	8	8	8	9	6	6	8	8	9	9	10	10	10	10	8	8
Phu Dong Ninh Binh	2	1	1	1	1	1	1	1	1	1	1	1	1	1	1	1	1	1	1	1	1	1
PVF-CAND	7	4	2	3	3	3	3	3	3	3	2	3	3	3	3	3	3	3	3	3	3	3
Truong Tuoi Binh Phuoc	8	3	3	2	2	2	2	2	2	2	3	2	2	2	2	2	2	2	2	2	2	2

Promotion to 2025–26 V.League 1
Qualification for promotion play-offs
Relegation to Vietnamese Second Division

Source: VPF

== Season statistics ==
=== Top goalscorers ===
As of 21 June 2025

Rank	Player	Club	Goals
1	(Vietnam) Lưu Tự Nhân	Truong Tuoi Binh Phuoc	9
2	(Vietnam) Nguyễn Công Phượng	Truong Tuoi Binh Phuoc	7
3	(Vietnam) Phạm Gia Hưng	Phu Dong Ninh Binh	6
3	(Vietnam) Nguyễn Hữu Khôi	Dong Thap/Truong Tuoi Binh Phuoc	6
5	(Vietnam) Nguyễn Quốc Việt	Phu Dong Ninh Binh	5
5	(Vietnam) Trần Hoàng Phương	Khatoco Khanh Hoa	5
5	(Vietnam) Hồ Thanh Minh	PVF-CAND	5
5	(Vietnam) Nguyễn Thanh Nhàn	PVF-CAND	5
9	(Vietnam) Đinh Thanh Bình	Phu Dong Ninh Binh	4
9	(Vietnam) Lê Minh Bình	Phu Dong Ninh Binh	4
9	(Vietnam) Mạch Ngọc Hà	Phu Dong Ninh Binh	4
9	(Vietnam) Nguyễn Hữu Tuấn	Hue	4

=== Hat-tricks ===
Player	For	Against	Result	Date
(Vietnam) Nguyễn Hữu Khôi	Dong Thap	Hue	3–0 (H)	20 April 2025
