= Quan Văn Chuẩn =

Vietnamese footballer

Personal information
- Full name: Quan Văn Chuẩn
- Date of birth: 7 January 2001 (age 25)
- Place of birth: Chiêm Hóa, Tuyên Quang, Vietnam
- Height: 1.81 m (5 ft 11 in)
- Position: Goalkeeper

Team information
- Current team: Hà Nội
- Number: 1

Youth career
- 2011–2020: Hà Nội

Senior career*
Years	Team	Apps	(Gls)
2020–	Hà Nội	53	(0)
2020–2021	→ Phú Thọ (loan)	10	(0)

International career^{‡}
2019–2021	Vietnam U19	4	(0)
2022–2024	Vietnam U23	31	(0)
Medal record
Men's football
Representing Vietnam
SEA Games
Gold medal – first place	Hanoi 2021	Team
Bronze medal – third place	Phnom Penh 2023	Team
AFF U-23 Championship
Winner	Thailand 2023
- * Club domestic league appearances and goals as of 21 November 2026 ‡ National team caps and goals as of 20 April 2024

Quan Văn Chuẩn (born 7 January 2001) is a Vietnamese professional footballer who plays as a goalkeeper for V.League 1 club Hà Nội.

== Club career ==
Quan Văn Chuẩn was associated with the Hanoi academy from the age of ten.

In 2020, Chuẩn was sent on loan, along with some other Hanoi youths, to the Vietnamese Second Division club Phu Tho FC on a season-long loan deal, to gain match experience. He also spent the first half of the 2021 season at Phu Tho before returning to Hanoi after the season was canceled due to COVID-19.

On 8 September 2022, Chuẩn made his Hanoi FC debut in a 5–0 victory against Binh Phuoc in the Vietnamese Cup quarterfinals.

== Career statistics ==
As of match played 21 November 2026

Appearances and goals by club, season and competition
Club	Season	League			Cup		Continental		Other		Total	
Club	Season	Division	Apps	Goals	Apps	Goals	Apps	Goals	Apps	Goals	Apps	Goals
Phú Thọ	2020	Second Division	5	0	—		—		0	0	5	0
Phú Thọ	2021	V.League 2	5	0	0	0	—		—		5	0
Phú Thọ	Total		10	0	0	0	0	0	0	0	10	0
Hà Nội	2022	V.League 1	0	0	1	0	—		—		1	0
Hà Nội	2023	V.League 1	1	0	0	0	—		0	0	1	0
Hà Nội	2023–24	V.League 1	12	0	1	0	2 (Note: Appearances in AFC Champions League)	0	—		15	0
Hà Nội	2024–25	V.League 1	10	0	0	0	—		—		10	0
Hà Nội	2025–26	V.League 1	22	0	0	0	—		—		22	0
Hà Nội	2026–27	V.League 1	8	0	1	0	—		—		9	0
Hà Nội	Total		53	0	3	0	2	0	0	0	58	0
Total career			63	0	3	0	2	0	0	0	68	0

== Honours ==
Hà Nội

- V.League 1: 2022
- Vietnamese National Cup: 2022
- Vietnamese Super Cup: 2022

Vietnam U23

- SEA Games gold medal: 2021; bronze medal 2023
- AFF U-23 Championship: 2023

Individual

- AFF U-23 Championship Best Goalkeeper: 2023
- AFF U-23 Championship Team of the Tournament: 2023
