= 2020 Vietnamese Football League Second Division =

22nd season of the Vietnamese Football League Second Division

Vietnamese Football League Second Division
- Season: 2020
- Dates: 10 July – 16 November 2020
- Champions: Phú Thọ; Phù Đổng
- Promoted: Phú Thọ; Phù Đổng; ~~Gia Định~~; Công An Nhân Dân
- Matches: 101

The 2020 Vietnamese Football League Second Division was the 21st season of the Vietnamese Football League Second Division. The season began on 10 July.

== Teams ==
15 sides compete in the 2020 season, split into two groups, A and B, of 7 and 8 respectively.

Group A

Team	Location	Stadium	Capacity
SHB Đà Nẵng B	Da Nang	Hòa Xuân Stadium	20,000
Kon Tum	Kon Tum	Kon Tum Stadium	15,000
Lâm Đồng	Da Lat	Lâm Viên Stadium	2,000
Nam Định B	Nam Định	Thiên Trường Stadium	30,000
Phù Đổng	Hanoi	Hoàng Mai Stadium	2,200
Phú Thọ	Phú Thọ	Phú Thọ Stadium	20,000
PVF	Hưng Yên	PVF Stadium	4,600

Group B

Team	Location	Stadium	Capacity
Bình Thuận	Bình Thuận	Phan Thiết Stadium	6,000
Công An Nhân Dân	Hanoi	Thanh Trì Stadium	4,000
Đồng Nai	Biên Hòa	Đồng Nai Stadium	20,000
Gia Định	Ho Chi Minh City	Tân Hiệp Stadium	1,000
Ho Chi Minh City Youth	Ho Chi Minh City	Thành Long Stadium	7,000
Tiền Giang	Mỹ Tho	Tiền Giang Stadium	10,000
Triệu Minh	Bến Tre	Bến Tre Stadium	TBD
Vĩnh Long	Vĩnh Long	Vĩnh Long Stadium	10,000

== Personnel and kits ==
Note: Flags indicate national team as has been defined under FIFA eligibility rules. Players may hold more than one non-FIFA nationality.

Team	Manager	Kit manufacturer	Shirt sponsor
Kon Tum	Hồ Mạnh Cường		
Lam Dong	Nguyễn Mạnh Quý		
Nam Dinh B	Vũ Khánh Hưng	Kelme	
Phu Dong	Lê Đức Tuấn	Li-Ning	Mitsubishi Motors
Phú Thọ	Dương Hồng Sơn	Donexpro	Donexpro
PVF	Mauro Jerónimo	Mizuno	
Binh Thuan	Đào Thanh Sơn		
Cong An Nhan Dan	Phạm Quang Thanh	Grand Sport	
Dong Nai	Hoàng Hải Dương		
Gia Dinh	Flávio Luiz	Demenino Sport	
Ho Chi Minh City Youth			
SHB Da Nang B	Võ Phước	Kamito	
Tien Giang	Nguyễn Kim Hằng		
Trieu Minh	Lê Quốc Vượng		
Vinh Long	Nguyễn Minh Cảnh		

== League tables ==
=== Group A ===
Pos	Team	Pld	W	D	L	GF	GA	GD	Pts	Qualification or relegation
1	Phú Thọ (Q)	12	7	4	1	22	7	+15	25	Qualification to the Final stage
2	Phù Đổng (Q)	12	6	3	3	16	14	+2	21	Qualification to the Final stage
3	PVF	12	5	5	2	13	6	+7	20	
4	Kon Tum	12	4	2	6	16	22	−6	14	
5	SHB Đà Nẵng B	12	2	6	4	12	15	−3	12	
6	Lâm Đồng	12	2	4	6	7	17	−10	10	
7	Nam Định B (R)	12	1	6	5	7	12	−5	9	Relegation to 2021 Vietnamese National Football Third League

Updated to match(es) played on 6 November 2020. Source: Soccerway, VFF
Rules for classification: 1) Points; 2) Goal difference; 3) Goals scored
(Q) Qualified for the phase indicated; (R) Relegated

=== Group B ===
Pos	Team	Pld	W	D	L	GF	GA	GD	Pts	Qualification or relegation
1	Gia Định (Q)	14	11	2	1	35	11	+24	35	Qualification to the Final stage
2	Công An Nhân Dân (Q)	14	11	2	1	47	10	+37	35	Qualification to the Final stage
3	Vĩnh Long	14	7	2	5	24	17	+7	23	
4	Bình Thuận	14	5	2	7	17	26	−9	17	
5	Ho Chi Minh City Youth	14	3	4	7	16	32	−16	13	
6	Đồng Nai	14	4	0	10	16	30	−14	12	
7	Tiền Giang	14	3	3	8	22	33	−11	12	
8	Triệu Minh	14	3	3	8	19	37	−18	12	

Updated to match(es) played on 6 November 2020. Source: Soccerway, VFF
Rules for classification: 1) Points; 2) Goal difference; 3) Goals scored
(Q) Qualified for the phase indicated

=== Ranking of last-placed teams ===
Due to the difference of teams between the 2 groups, results of the matches between the last-placed team in group B and the group B winners will not be counted.

Pos	Grp	Team	Pld	W	D	L	GF	GA	GD	Pts	Relegation
1	B	Triệu Minh	12	3	3	6	16	29	−13	12	
2	A	Nam Định B (R)	12	1	6	5	7	12	−5	9	Relegation to 2021 Vietnamese National Football Third League

Updated to match(es) played on 6 November 2020. Source:
Rules for classification: 1) Points; 2) Goal difference; 3) Goals scored
(R) Relegated

== Final stage ==
=== Semi-finals ===
Winners are awarded as co-champions and promoted to the 2021 V.League 2. Losers enter the promotion final match.

13 November 2020
15:00

Phú Thọ	0-0	Công An Nhân Dân
Penalties
	3-1

Nha Trang Stadium, Nha Trang, Khánh Hòa
13 November 2020
17:30

Gia Định	2-3	Phù Đổng

Nha Trang Stadium, Nha Trang, Khánh Hòa

=== Promotion final ===
Winners are awarded as third-placers and promoted to the 2021 V.League 2.

16 November 2020
15:00

Công An Nhân Dân	0-1	Gia Định

Nha Trang Stadium, Nha Trang, Khánh Hòa

== See also ==
- 2020 V.League 1
- 2020 V.League 2
- 2020 Vietnamese National Football Third League
