= Đinh Thanh Bình =

Vietnamese footballer (born 1998)

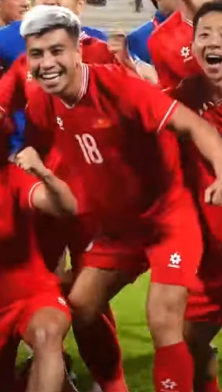
- Thanh Bình in 2025

Personal information
- Full name: Đinh Thanh Bình
- Date of birth: 19 March 1998 (age 28)
- Place of birth: Lang Chánh, Thanh Hóa, Vietnam
- Height: 1.77 m (5 ft 10 in)
- Position: Forward

Team information
- Current team: Công An Hà Nội
- Number: 18

Youth career
- 2014–2015: Hoàng Anh Gia Lai

Senior career*
| Years | Team | Apps | (Gls) |
| 2016–2024 | Hoàng Anh Gia Lai | 48 | (6) |
| 2019 | → Viettel (loan) | 6 | (0) |
| 2020–2022 | → Công An Nhân Dân (loan) | 34 | (15) |
| 2024 | LPBank HCMC | 0 | (0) |
| 2024–2026 | Ninh Bình | 19 | (4) |
| 2026 | → Công An Hồ Chí Minh City (loan) | 12 | (0) |
| 2026– | Công An Hà Nội | 0 | (0) |

International career^{‡}
| 2016–2017 | Vietnam U20 | 14 | (0) |
| 2017–2018 | Vietnam U21 | 10 | (4) |
| 2019–2020 | Vietnam U23 | 2 | (1) |
| 2023– | Vietnam | 10 | (0) |
Medal record
Men's football
Representing Vietnam
ASEAN Championship
| Winner | ASEAN 2024 |
- * Club domestic league appearances and goals as of 7 June 2026 ‡ National team caps and goals as of 19 March 2025

Đinh Thanh Bình (born 19 March 1998) is a Vietnamese professional footballer who plays as a forward for V.League 1 club Công An Hà Nội and the Vietnam national team.

== Club career ==
Thanh Bình made his way through the youth teams at Hoang Anh Gia Lai before making his senior debut in 2016. He was loaned to Công An Nhân Dân between 2020 and 2022, and play an important role in the team's promotion to the 2021 V.League 2 and then the 2022 V.League 2 title, being the team's best goalscorer at the campaign with 7 goals.

Thanh Bình gained a starter spot at Hoàng Anh Gia Lai in the 2023–24 season and scored 4 goals, which helped the team avoid relegation.

In July 2024, Thanh Bình was loaned to V.League 2 side LPBank HCMC. However, the club later exchanged all its players with Phù Đổng Ninh Bình, resulting in Thanh Bình's move to the latter. Dân Việt reported that Phù Đổng Ninh Bình paid Hoàng Anh Gia Lai around 26 billion VND (around €950,000) to sign Thanh Bình, Nguyễn Đức Việt and Lê Minh Bình.

On 19 July 2026, Thanh Bình moved to Công An Hà Nội.

== International career ==
Thanh Bình played youth international football for Vietnam's under-19, under-20, under-21 and under-23 teams. He was part of the under-20 squad at the 2017 FIFA U20 World Cup in South Korea.

In June 2023, Thanh Bình was called up to the senior Vietnam squad for the first time, for friendly games against Hong Kong and Syria. He made his debut in the former on 15 June at the Lach Tray Stadium, replacing Nguyễn Văn Tùng in the start of the second half.

== Career statistics ==
=== International appearances ===
As of match played 5 January 2025

Appearances and goals by national team and year
| National team | Year | Apps | Goals |
|---|---|---|---|
| Vietnam | 2023 | 2 | 0 |
| Vietnam | 2024 | 6 | 0 |
| Vietnam | 2024 | 1 | 0 |
| Total | | 9 | 0 |

=== International goals ===
==== U-23 ====
Scores and results list Vietnam's goal tally first. Only results against national teams were counted

| # | Date | Venue | Opponent | Score | Result | Competition |
|---|---|---|---|---|---|---|
| 1 | 22 March 2019 | Mỹ Đình National Stadium, Hanoi, Vietnam | Brunei | 3–0 | 6–0 | 2020 AFC U-23 Championship qualification |

== Honours ==
Công An Hà Nội

- V.League 2: 2022
- Vietnamese Super Cup: 2026

Phù Đổng Ninh Bình

- V.League 2: 2024–25

Công An Hồ Chí Minh City

- Vietnamese National Cup: 2025–26

Vietnam

- ASEAN Championship: 2024

Individual

- V.League 2 Team of the Season: 2024–25
