= Nguyễn Ngọc Mỹ =

Vietnamese footballer (born 2004)

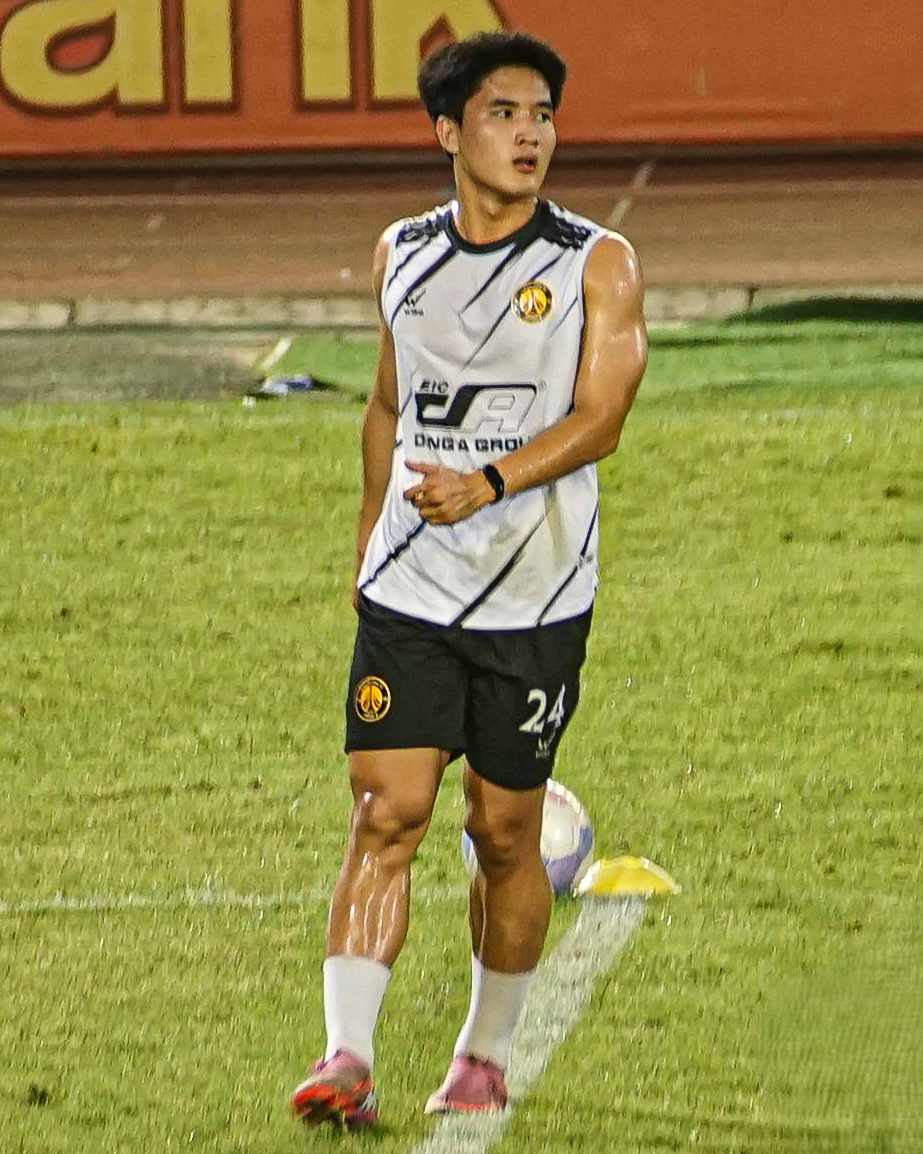
- Ngọc Mỹ in 2026

Personal information
- Full name: Nguyễn Ngọc Mỹ
- Date of birth: 20 February 2004 (age 22)
- Place of birth: Thanh Hóa, Vietnam
- Height: 1.77 m (5 ft 10 in)
- Position: Winger

Team information
- Current team: Ninh Bình

Youth career
- –2023: Thanh Hóa

Senior career*
Years	Team	Apps	(Gls)
2022–2026	Đông Á Thanh Hóa	38	(6)
2023	→ Phú Thọ (loan)	9	(1)
2023–2024	→ Trường Tươi Bình Phước (loan)	16	(0)
2026–	Ninh Bình	6	(1)

International career^{‡}
2022–2023	Vietnam U20	4	(1)
2025–2026	Vietnam U23	18	(2)
Medal record
Men's football
Representing Vietnam
AFC U-23 Asian Cup
Third place	Saudi Arabia 2026
ASEAN U-23 Championship
Winner	Indonesia 2025
- * Club domestic league appearances and goals as of 30 October 2026 ‡ National team caps and goals as of 25 September 2026

Nguyễn Ngọc Mỹ (born 20 February 2004) is a Vietnamese professional footballer who plays as a winger for V.League 1 club Ninh Bình.

== Early career ==
Ngọc Mỹ is a youth product of the Thanh Hóa youth academy. In 2023, he led the Thanh Hóa U-19 to win the Vietnamese National U-19 Championship title. He scored a total of 4 goals during the tournament, including the winning goal in the final and was consequently named as the best player of the tournament.

== Club career ==
In July 2022, Ngọc Mỹ was promoted to Thanh Hóa's first team to play in the second half of the 2022 V.League 1. He made his professional debut on 19 November 2022, in the last matchday of the 2022 V.League season, starting in the 1–2 defeat against Hồng Lĩnh Hà Tĩnh.

Ngọc Mỹ was loaned to V.League 2 team Phú Thọ during the 2023 season. He scored his first career goal against Phù Đổng on 1 July 2023 in a 1–3 league defeat.

In August 2023, he joined V.League 2 side Trường Tươi Bình Phước on a loan deal.

Ngọc Mỹ returned to Thanh Hóa at the 2024–25 season. On 10 November, he had the first game as the starter of the team in a 1–0 away win against Sông Lam Nghệ An. A week later, he scored the second goal of Thanh Hóa in their 2–1 victory against Thể Công-Viettel.

On 13 January 2026, Ninh Bình announced the signing of Ngọc Mỹ. He was loaned back to Thanh Hóa until the end of the 2025–26 season.

== International career ==
In August 2023, Ngọc Mỹ was named in Vietnam U23 preliminary squad for the 2023 AFF U-23 Championship but was not selected in the final list.

In June 2026, Ngọc Mỹ received his first call-up to the Vietnam national team, being named in the preliminary squad for the 2026 ASEAN Championship.

== Career statistics ==
=== Club ===
As of match played 30 October 2026

Appearances and goals by club, season and competition
Club	Season	League			Cup		Continental		Other		Total	
Club	Season	Division	Apps	Goals	Apps	Goals	Apps	Goals	Apps	Goals	Apps	Goals
Đông Á Thanh Hóa	2023	V.League 1	1	0	0	0	—		—		1	0
Đông Á Thanh Hóa	2024–25	V.League 1	15	2	1	0	—		2 (Note: Appearance in the ASEAN Club Championship)	0	18	2
Đông Á Thanh Hóa	2025–26	V.League 1	22	4	1	0	—		—		23	4
Đông Á Thanh Hóa	Total		38	6	2	0	0	0	2	0	42	6
Phú Thọ (loan)	2023	V.League 2	9	1	1	0	—		—		10	1
Trường Tươi Bình Phước (loan)	2023–24	V.League 2	16	0	1	0	—		—		17	0
Ninh Bình	2026–27	V.League 1	6	1	0	0	—		—		6	1
Total career			69	8	4	0	0	0	2	0	75	8

== Honours ==
Thanh Hóa

- Vietnamese Super Cup: 2023

Vietnam U19

- International Thanh Niên Newspaper Cup: 2022

Vietnam U23

- ASEAN U-23 Championship: 2025
- SEA Games gold medal: 2025
- AFC U-23 Asian Cup third place: 2026

Vietnam

- ASEAN Championship: 2026

Individual

- Vietnamese National U-19 Championship best player: 2023
- Vietnamese National U-21 Championship top scorer: 2024
