= Lê Xuân Hùng =

Vietnamese footballer (born 1991)

Personal information
- Full name: Lê Xuân Hùng
- Date of birth: 14 November 1991 (age 34)
- Place of birth: Quan Hóa, Thanh Hóa, Vietnam
- Height: 1.70 m (5 ft 7 in)
- Position: Winger

Team information
- Current team: Phú Thọ
- Number: 39

Youth career
- 2005–2008: Thanh Hóa

Senior career*
Years	Team	Apps	(Gls)
2009	Thanh Hóa	1	(0)
2010	Hồng Lĩnh Hà Tĩnh	3	(0)
2011	Xuân Thành Sài Gòn	2	(1)
2012–2014	An Giang	34	(6)
2014	Champasak United	5	(0)
2014–2015	Khon Kaen FC	2	(0)
2015	Champasak United	3	(0)
2016–2019	Hải Phòng	63	(8)
2020–2023	Thanh Hóa	20	(0)
2023–	Phú Thọ	7	(0)
- * Club domestic league appearances and goals as of 2 October 2018

Lê Xuân Hùng (born 14 November 1991) is a Vietnamese footballer who plays as a winger for V.League 2 club Phú Thọ.

== Honours ==
=== Club ===
Đông Á Thanh Hóa

- Vietnamese National Cup:

(bronze) Third place : 2022
(gold) Champion : 2023
