= 2023 V.League 2 =

Gold Star V.League 2 - 2023
- Season: 2023
- Dates: 6 April – 26 August
- Champions: Quang Nam
- Promoted: Quang Nam
- Matches: 90
- Goals: 231 (2.57 per match)
- Top goalscorer: Nguyễn Thanh Nhàn (PVF-CAND); Lê Văn Nam (Quang Nam) (10 goals)
- Biggest home win: Hue 7-0 Binh Thuan (15 August)
- Biggest away win: Binh Thuan 1-7 Quang Nam (15 August)
- Highest scoring: Binh Thuan 1-7 Quang Nam (15 August)
- Longest winning run: PVF-CAND (6 matches)
- Longest unbeaten run: Hoa Binh (12 matches)
- Longest winless run: Ba Ria-Vung Tau (9 matches)
- Longest losing run: Ba Ria-Vung Tau; Binh Thuan (4 matches)
- Highest attendance: 10.500; Quang Nam 4-0 Ba Ria-Vung Tau (26 August)
- Lowest attendance: 100 (several matches)
- Total attendance: 98.700
- Average attendance: 1097

The 2023 V.League 2, known as the Gold Star V.League 2 (Vietnamese: Giải bóng đá Hạng Nhất Quốc gia Bia Sao Vàng 2023) for sponsorship reasons, will be the 29th season of V. League 2, Vietnam's second tier professional football league. The season is scheduled to commence on 6 April 2023.

== Changes from the previous season ==
Promoted from 2022 Second Division	Relegated from 2022 V.League 1	Promoted to 2023 V.League 1	Relegated to 2023 Second Division	Not engaged
Binh Thuan; Hoa Binh	Saigon	Cong An Nhan Dan; Khanh Hoa	Daklak	~~Saigon~~; ~~Can Tho~~

=== Withdrawn clubs ===
On February 14, 2023, both Saigon and Can Tho announced they would not attend 2023 V.League 2 due to financial reasons. Saigon sold their spot in the league to Lam Dong before subsequently dissolving. However, Saigon said that their facilities and professional work have not met the conditions, not guaranteeing long-term progress so Saigon have been dissolved while Lam Dong still play in the Vietnamese Football League Second Division. Meanwhile, Can Tho will play in the Vietnamese Football League Third Division from the 2023–24 season.

=== Competition format ===
Initially, the Organizing Committee decided that the tournament would apply the format of season 2021 but with a few changes:

- Stage 1: Consists of 11 rounds of single round-robin, this result will divide 11 teams into 2 groups: the top 5 teams will enter group A, the remaining 6 teams will enter group B. The scores of the teams will remain the same when entering group stage 2.
- Stage 2:
  - Group A (Competition for the Championship): Consists of 5 teams, ranked from 1 to 5. Teams compete in another single round robin. Each team will play 2 home matches and 2 away matches. The winning team will compete in 2023–24 V.League 1.
  - Group B (Relegation Race): Consists of 6 teams, with ranking positions from 6 to 11. Teams compete in another single round robin. The teams ranked 6-8 in the first stage play 3 home matches, the remaining 3 teams play 2 home matches. The 11th-placed team will be relegated to the 2023–24 Vietnamese League Two.

However, with Saigon dropping out of the tournament, on March 3, VPF discussed and came to a decision to return to the double round-robin format with 18 rounds when the tournament had 10 teams left. The winning team will compete in 2023–24 V.League 1. The 10th-placed team will play a play-off against a team from the 2023 Vietnamese League Two to determine the team that will compete in the 2023–24 Vietnamese League Two.

=== Prize money ===
1st place: 1 billion VND (US$42643) ==> 2 billion VND (US$85286)
2nd place: 500 million VND (US$21321) ==> 1 billion VND (US$42643)
3rd place: 250 million VND (US$10660) ==> 500 million VND (US$21321)

=== Name change ===
Pho Hien FC changed their name to PVF-CAND FC on 22 February 2023.

== Participating clubs by province ==
Locations of the 2023 V.League 2 teams

Team	Location	Stadium	Capacity	Previous season rank
Ba Ria-Vung Tau	Ba Ria–Vung Tau	Ba Ria	10,000	VL2 (4th)
Binh Phuoc	Binh Phuoc	Binh Phuoc	11,000	VL2 (10th)
Binh Thuan	Ninh Thuan	Ninh Thuan	6,000	SD (playoffs)
Phu Dong	Ninh Binh	Ninh Binh	22,000	VL2 (11th)
Hoa Binh	Hoa Binh	Hoa Binh	3,600	SD (playoffs)
PVF-CAND	Hung Yen	PVF	4,500	VL2 (5th)
Long An	Long An	Long An	20,000	VL2 (6th)
Phu Tho	Phu Tho	Viet Tri	18,000	VL2 (9th)
Quang Nam	Quang Nam	Tam Ky	15,000	VL2 (3rd)
Hue	Thua Thien Hue	Tu Do	25,000	VL2 (7th)

== Personnel and kits ==
Team	Manager	Captain	Kit manufacturer	Shirt sponsor
Ba Ria-Vung Tau	(Vietnam) Nguyễn Minh Phương	(Vietnam) Huỳnh Văn Ly	(Vietnam) VNS	(Vietnam) Long Sơn Petrochemicals
Binh Phuoc	(Vietnam) Lê Thanh Xuân	(Vietnam) Lương Văn Kỳ	(Vietnam) Fraser Sports	
Binh Thuan	(Vietnam) Nguyễn Minh Dũng	(Vietnam) Trần Hữu Thắng	(Vietnam) VNA Sports	
Phu Dong	(Vietnam) Nguyễn Văn Đàn	(Vietnam) Dương Văn An	(Vietnam) Kamito	(Vietnam) Xuân Nam Việt Corp.
Hoa Binh	(Vietnam) Lê Quốc Vượng	(Vietnam) Trần Văn Thắng	(Vietnam) Kamito	VGEC (Vietnam Germany Eager Joint Stock Company)
PVF-CAND	(Portugal) Mauro Jerónimo	(Vietnam) Huỳnh Công Đến	(Vietnam) Kamito	
Long An	(Vietnam) Nguyễn Anh Đức	(Vietnam) Phan Tấn Tài		(Vietnam) Long An Port
Phu Tho	(Vietnam) Hồ Hoàng Tiến	(Vietnam) Lê Hải Đức	(Vietnam) HP Sport	
Quang Nam	(Vietnam) Văn Sỹ Sơn	(Vietnam) Ngân Văn Đại	(Vietnam) VNA Sports	
Hue	(Vietnam) Nguyễn Đức Dũng	(Vietnam) Nguyễn Tiến Tạo		

=== Managerial changes ===
Team	Outgoing manager	Manner of departure	Date of vacancy	Position in table	Incoming manager	Date of appointment
Long An FC	(Vietnam) Ngô Quang Sang	Promoted to technical director	15 November 2022	Pre-season	(Vietnam) Nguyễn Anh Đức	22 November 2022
Phu Tho FC	(Vietnam) Vũ Như Thành	27 May 2023	Resigned	10th	(Vietnam) Hồ Hoàng Tiến	30 May 2023

== League table ==
Pos	Team	Pld	W	D	L	GF	GA	GD	Pts	Promotion or relegation
1	Quang Nam (C)	18	11	4	3	40	15	+25	37	Promotion to V.League 1
2	PVF-CAND	18	11	4	3	30	14	+16	37	
3	Long An	18	8	7	3	32	24	+8	31	
4	Hoa Binh	18	5	9	4	17	15	+2	24	
5	Binh Thuan	18	7	2	9	23	44	−21	23	
6	Hue	18	5	6	7	19	19	0	21	
7	Phu Dong	18	4	7	7	16	21	−5	19	
8	Phu Tho	18	4	6	8	18	25	−7	18	
9	Ba Ria Vung Tau	18	3	7	8	13	24	−11	16	
10	Binh Phuoc (Q)	18	4	4	10	23	30	−7	16	Relegation play-off

Source: VPF
Rules for classification: 1) Points; 2) Head-to-head points; 3) Head-to-head goal difference; 4) Head-to-head goals scored (criterias from 2 to 4 are only applied at the end of the season); 5) Goal difference; 6) Goals scored.
(C) Champions; (Q) Qualified for the phase indicated

== Play-off to attend 2023–24 V.League 2 ==
30 August 2023
15:30 (GMT +7)

Binh Phuoc FC	1–1	Daklak FC
Penalties
	4–3

Thống Nhất Stadium, Ho Chi Minh City

== Results ==
Home \ Away	BRV	BIN	BTH	HBH	HUE	LAN	PHD	PHT	PVF	QNA
Ba Ria Vung Tau		2–1	2–3	1–1	2–0	2–4	0–0	1–0	0–3	0–0
Binh Phuoc FC	0–0		0–1	2–0	1–1	1–1	3–1	0–2	1–2	4–3
Binh Thuan FC	2–1	0–3		0–1	1–0	2–4	1–0	3–1	2–5	1–7
Hoa Binh FC	1–0	1–1	1–1		2–0	0–0	0–0	1–1	0–1	3–2
Hue FC	0–0	2–0	7–0	0–0		2–1	0–2	3–1	2–0	0–0
Long An FC	1–0	3–2	4–1	2–2	3–1		0–0	1–1	1–1	2–1
Phu Dong	1–1	3–2	2–3	0–0	0–0	1–3		2–0	0–2	0–0
Phu Tho FC	3–1	1–0	1–1	0–2	1–1	1–1	1–3		1–0	0–1
PVF-CAND	0–0	3–1	2–0	3–2	2–0	4–1	1–0	1–1		0–0
Quang Nam FC	4–0	4–1	3–1	1–0	3–0	2–0	4–1	3–2	2–0	

Source: vpf.vn
Legend: Blue = home team win; Yellow = draw; Red = away team win.

== Position by round ==
Team ╲ Round	1	2	3	4	5	6	7	8	9	10	11	12	13	14	15	16	17	18
Ba Ria Vung Tau FC	6	7	7	3	6	8	5	6	5	8	8	9	9	9	10	10	9	9
Binh Phuoc FC	8	8	8	9	8	4	6	9	9	9	9	10	10	10	9	9	10	10
Binh Thuan FC	4	2	6	8	5	7	8	5	7	4	3	5	4	5	5	5	6	5
Hoa Binh FC	10	10	10	7	7	9	9	8	8	6	6	6	5	4	4	4	4	4
Hue FC	2	5	2	4	4	6	7	3	3	7	7	7	8	7	7	7	5	6
Long An FC	9	9	4	5	9	5	3	4	4	5	4	4	3	3	3	3	3	3
Phu Dong	1	4	5	6	3	3	4	7	6	3	5	3	6	6	6	6	7	7
Phu Tho FC	5	6	9	10	10	10	10	10	10	10	10	8	7	8	8	8	8	8
PVF-CAND	3	1	1	1	1	1	1	2	2	2	2	2	2	2	2	2	2	2
Quang Nam FC	7	3	3	2	2	2	2	1	1	1	1	1	1	1	1	1	1	1

Promotion to 2023-2024 V.League 1
Relegation

Source: VPF

== Attendances to stadium ==
Pos	Team	Total	High	Low	Average	Change
1	Hoa Binh FC	5,000	2,500	2,500	2,500	n/a
2	Ba Ria Vung Tau FC	4,500	2,500	2,000	2,250	+15.1%
3	Hue FC	4,000	2,500	1,500	2,000	+37.6%
4	Binh Thuan FC	2,000	1,000	1,000	1,000	n/a
5	Binh Phuoc FC	2,000	1,000	1,000	1,000	−16.7%
6	Long An FC	2,000	1,000	1,000	1,000	+6.8%
7	PVF-CAND	1,900	1,500	400	950	+10.1%
8	Quang Nam FC	1,500	1,200	300	750	−59.2%
9	Phu Dong	500	500		500	+31.2%
10	Phu Tho FC	800	500	300	400	−17.7%
	League total	20,100	2,500		1,340	+3.4%

Source: vpf.vn

== Season statistics ==
=== Top scorers ===
Rank	Player	Club	Goals
1	(Vietnam) Nguyễn Thanh Nhàn	PVF-CAND	10
1	(Vietnam) Lê Văn Nam	Quảng Nam	10
3	(Vietnam) Lê Minh Bình	PVF-CAND	9
4	(Vietnam) Phù Trung Phong	Bình Phước	8
4	(Vietnam) Nguyễn Minh Quang	Bình Thuận	8
4	(Vietnam) Nguyễn Đình Bắc	Quảng Nam	8
7	(Vietnam) Hồ Thanh Minh	Huế	7
8	(Vietnam) Trần Gia Huy	Hòa Bình	5
8	(Vietnam) Ngô Hoàng Anh	Long An	5
8	(Vietnam) Lê Thanh Phong	Long An	5
8	(Vietnam) Lê Hải Đức	Phú Thọ	5

=== Hat-tricks ===
Player	For	Against	Result	Date
(Vietnam) Phù Trung Phong	Bình Phước	Quảng Nam	4–3 (H)	25 May 2023
(Vietnam) Nguyễn Thanh Nhàn	PVF-CAND	Bình Thuận	5–2 (A)	3 August 2023
(Vietnam) Nguyễn Đình Bắc^{4}	Quảng Nam	Bình Thuận	7–1 (A)	15 August 2023
(Vietnam) Lê Văn Nam	Quảng Nam	Bình Thuận	7–1 (A)	15 August 2023

=== Clean sheets ===
Rank	Player	Club	Matches
1	(Vietnam) Dương Văn Cường	Phù Đổng	9
1	(Vietnam) Tống Đức An	Quảng Nam	9
3	(Vietnam) Nguyễn Tiến Tạo	Huế	6
3	(Vietnam) Phí Minh Long	PVF-CAND	6
5	(Vietnam) Nguyễn Anh Tuấn	Bà Rịa-Vũng Tàu	5
