= Đỗ Sỹ Huy =

Vietnamese footballer (born 1998)

Personal information
- Full name: Đỗ Sỹ Huy
- Date of birth: 16 April 1998 (age 28)
- Place of birth: Hoàng Mai, Hanoi, Vietnam
- Height: 1.81 m (5 ft 11 in)
- Position: Goalkeeper

Team information
- Current team: SHB Đà Nẵng
- Number: 33

Youth career
- 2015–2017: Hà Nội

Senior career*
Years	Team	Apps	(Gls)
2016–2018	Hà Nội B	31	(0)
2017–2021	Hà Nội	0	(0)
2018–2019	→ Hồng Lĩnh Hà Tĩnh (loan)	4	(0)
2020	→ Tuấn Tú Phú Thọ (loan)	7	(0)
2021–2025	Công An Hà Nội	28	(0)
2025–2026	PVF-CAND	8	(0)
2026–	SHB Đà Nẵng	2	(0)

International career^{‡}
2017–2019	Vietnam U20	3	(0)
- * Club domestic league appearances and goals as of 13 September 2026 ‡ National team caps and goals as of 25 April 2018

Đỗ Sỹ Huy (born 16 April 1998) is a Vietnamese professional footballer who plays as a goalkeeper for V.League 1 club SHB Đà Nẵng.

== Club career ==
In August 2025, Sỹ Huy was transferred to newly promoted V.League 1 side PVF-CAND.

On 22 July 2026, Sỹ Huy joined SHB Đà Nẵng.

== International career ==
Sỹ Huy was named as Vietnam Olympic's captain at the 2022 Asian Games, being the only overage player in the team. However, he didn't appear in any games during the tournament.

== Honours ==
Hồng Lĩnh Hà Tĩnh

- V.League 2: 2019

Công An Hà Nội

- V.League 2: 2022
- V.League 1: 2023
- Vietnamese National Cup: 2024–25

Individual

- Vietnamese National U-19 Football Championship best goalkeeper: 2016
