= Đỗ Thanh Thịnh =

Vietnamese footballer (born 1998)

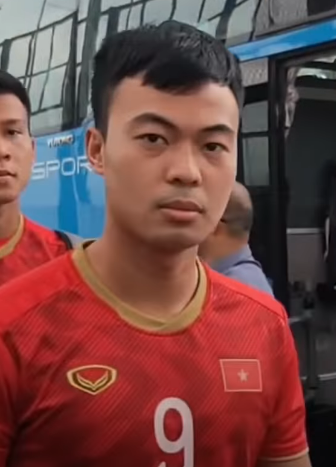
- Thanh Thịnh in 2019

Personal information
- Full name: Đỗ Thanh Thịnh
- Date of birth: 18 August 1998 (age 28)
- Place of birth: Hội An, Quảng Nam, Vietnam
- Height: 1.70 m (5 ft 7 in)
- Position: Left-back

Team information
- Current team: Ninh Bình
- Number: 6

Youth career
- 2010–2015: PVF Football Academy

Senior career*
Years	Team	Apps	(Gls)
2016–2021	SHB Đà Nẵng	56	(0)
2022–2024	Quy Nhơn Bình Định	43	(2)
2024	→ Thép Xanh Nam Định (loan)	9	(0)
2024–	Ninh Bình	44	(4)

International career^{‡}
2015–2018	Vietnam U19	13	(2)
2019–2020	Vietnam U23	4	(0)
- * Club domestic league appearances and goals as of 7 June 2026 ‡ National team caps and goals as of 8 September 2019

Đỗ Thanh Thịnh (born 18 August 1998) is a Vietnamese professional footballer who plays as a left-back for V.League 1 club Ninh Bình.

== Club career ==
On 19 March 2024, Thép Xanh Nam Định announced the signing of Thanh Thịnh to the team on a loan deal until the end of the 2023–24 season.

== International career ==
On 25 December 2023, Thanh Thịnh was selected in Vietnam's 34-man provisional squad for the 2023 Asian Cup, but later did not feature in the final list.

== Honours ==
Thép Xanh Nam Định

- V.League 1: 2023–24

Phù Đổng Ninh Bình

- V.League 2: 2024–25

Vietnam U23

- SEA Games gold medal: 2019

Individual

- V.League 2 Team of the Season: 2024–25
