= Lê Minh Bình =

Vietnamese footballer (born 1999)

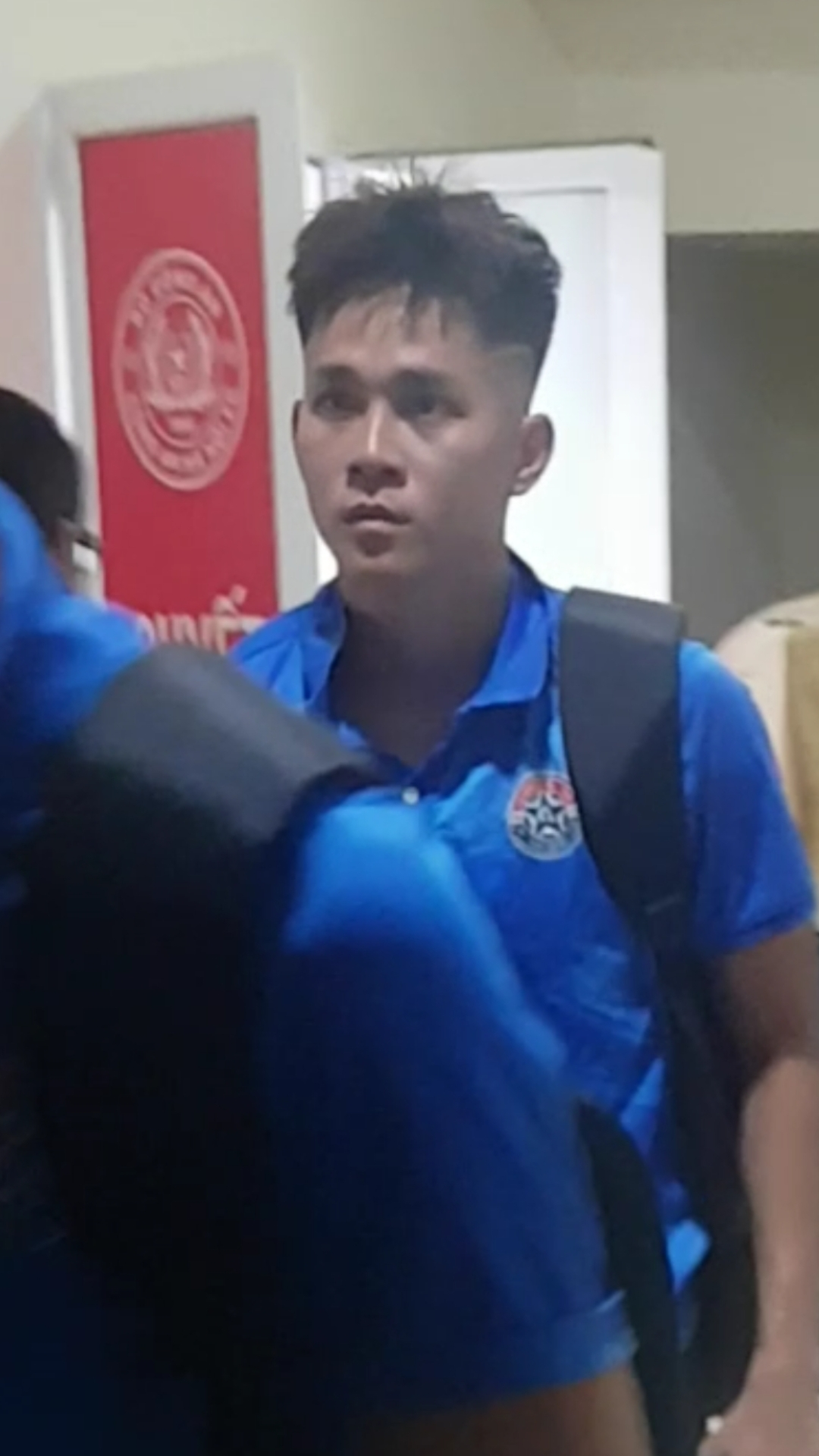
- Minh Bình in 2024

Personal information
- Full name: Lê Minh Bình
- Date of birth: 25 December 1999 (age 26)
- Place of birth: Đồng Phú, Bình Phước, Vietnam
- Height: 1.75 m (5 ft 9 in)
- Positions: Striker; winger

Team information
- Current team: Hưng Yên
- Number: 68

Youth career
- 2010–2013: Bình Phước
- 2013–2019: Hoàng Anh Gia Lai

Senior career*
| Years | Team | Apps | (Gls) |
| 2019–2024 | Hoàng Anh Gia Lai | 3 | (0) |
| 2019 | → Hải Phòng (loan) | 0 | (0) |
| 2020 | → Bà Rịa-Vũng Tàu (loan) | 13 | (5) |
| 2021–2022 | → Công An Nhân Dân (loan) | 25 | (9) |
| 2023–2024 | → PVF-CAND (loan) | 34 | (13) |
| 2024–2026 | Ninh Bình | 14 | (4) |
| 2025–2026 | → Becamex Hồ Chí Minh City (loan) | 13 | (0) |
| 2026– | Hưng Yên | 2 | (3) |

International career^{‡}
| 2014–2016 | Vietnam U17 | 2 | (0) |
| 2017–2019 | Vietnam U20 | 12 | (3) |
| 2019–2022 | Vietnam U23 | 8 | (1) |
- * Club domestic league appearances and goals as of 11 October 2026 ‡ National team caps and goals as of 20 April 2023

Lê Minh Bình (born 25 December 1999) is a Vietnamese professional footballer who plays as a striker for V.League 2 club Hưng Yên.

== Early career ==
Born in Bình Phước, Minh Bình played for the youth team of his province before he was admitted to the HAGL – Arsenal JMG Academy in 2013. In 2018, Minh Bình gained media attention after becoming the top scorer of the International Thanh Niên Newspaper Cup with 4 goals with Hoàng Anh Gia Lai U-19.

== Club career ==
In 2019, Minh Bình was promoted to Hoàng Anh Gia Lai first team. He made two V.League 1 appearances before getting loaned to Hải Phòng during the second half of the 2019 season but didn't play a single minute.

In 2020, Minh Bình was loaned to V.League 2 side Bà Rịa-Vũng Tàu. As a regular starter for the team, Minh Bình scored 5 goals after 13 matches, thus played a big role on helping the team finishing first in the phase 1 league table, then as runners-up in the phase 2 league table.

In 2021, Minh Bình joined Công An Nhân Dân on a one-year loan deal. After a first season cut short after the league was cancelled due to the COVID-19 situation in Vietnam, Công An Nhân Dân extended his loan for another year. During the 2022 season, Minh Bình appeared in all 20 league games with the team and scored 6 goals as the team was crowned as champions.

In 2023, Minh Bình joined PVF-CAND on loan.

In October 2024, Minh Bình was transferred to Phù Đổng Ninh Bình. Dân Việt reported that Phù Đổng Ninh Bình paid Hoàng Anh Gia Lai around 26 billion VND (around €950,000) to sign Minh Bình, Nguyễn Quốc Việt and Nguyễn Đức Việt.

In August 2026, Minh Bình moved to V.League 2 club Hưng Yên.

== International career ==
Mình Bình was a youth international for Vietnam. He played in all Vietnam youth categories from under-15 to U-23.

Minh Bình participated in the 2022 AFC U-23 Asian Cup with Vietnam U-23. He appeared in two matches, against Thailand in the group stage and against Saudi Arabia in the quarter-finals.

== Honours ==
Công An Nhân Dân

- V.League 2: 2022

PVF-CAND

- Vietnamese National Cup third place: 2023

Phù Đổng Ninh Bình

- V.League 2: 2024–25
