= Ninh Binh FC =

Vietnamese football club

Ninh Bình
- Full name: Ninh Bình Football Club (Câu lạc bộ bóng đá Ninh Bình)
- Nickname: Hoa Lư Ancient Capital Football Team (Vietnamese: Đội bóng Cố đô Hoa Lư)
- Founded: 2015; 11 years ago as Phù Đổng
- Ground: Ninh Bình Stadium
- Capacity: 25.000
- Chairman: Nguyễn Ngọc Mỹ Anh
- Head coach: Chu Đình Nghiêm
- League: V.League 1
- 2025–26: V.League 1, 3rd of 14
- Website: Club website
Home colours	Away colours	Third colours

Ninh Bình Football Club (Vietnamese: Câu lạc bộ bóng đá Ninh Bình), formerly known as Phù Đổng, is a Vietnamese professional football club based in Ninh Bình, Vietnam. The club currently competes at the V.League 1, the top tier of Vietnamese football after promotion from the 2024–25 V.League 2.

Throughout their history, the club has won their only major honours winning the 2024–25 V.League 2 league title.

== History ==
=== Phù Đổng era (2015–2022) ===
Phù Đổng Football Club was established in Hanoi on 4 October 2015. The club aimed to develop a professional football organisation built around supporters and community participation. Beginning in the Vietnamese Football League Third Division, Phù Đổng won the competition in 2016 and secured promotion to the Vietnamese Football League Second Division. Before the 2017 season, the club strengthened its squad by recruiting former Vietnam international defender Vũ Như Thành, who became captain, and retaining midfielder Cao Sỹ Cường. The club also secured sponsorship from Mitsubishi Motors to support its development and competitive ambitions.

Phù Đổng continued to progress through the Vietnamese football league system, winning the Second Division in 2018 to earn promotion to the V.League 2. However, the club struggled during its first campaign in the second tier in 2019 and subsequently returned to the Second Division. In 2020, Phù Đổng again secured promotion after winning the Second Division, allowing the club to return to V.League 2. Following the promotion, the club continued to establish itself in the national league structure. Its home ground in Hanoi was Thanh Trì Stadium, but from the 2023 season the club began playing its home matches at Ninh Bình Stadium in Ninh Bình province.

=== Relocation to Ninh Bình and rebranding ===
During the 2023–24 season, the club established its permanent base in Ninh Bình and adopted the name Phù Đổng Ninh Bình. The move marked a new chapter for the organisation, which sought to build a stronger connection with the province and restore a regular presence in its local football community following the dissolution of Vissai Ninh Bình in 2014. The club continued competing in V.League 2 while preparing for a longer-term push towards the top division.

==== LPBank investment and promotion to V.League 1 (2024–present) ====
The 2024–25 season marked a major turning point for Phù Đổng Ninh Bình after LPBank became the club's principal investor. The restructuring involved a substantial change to the playing squad and technical staff, alongside increased investment in recruitment. Among the notable arrivals were Vietnam internationals Nguyễn Hoàng Đức, Đặng Văn Lâm and Đinh Thanh Bình. The recruitment drive strengthened the team's squad as it pursued promotion to the top flight.

Under head coach Nguyễn Việt Thắng, Phù Đổng Ninh Bình dominated the 2024–25 V.League 2 campaign, finishing the season unbeaten and winning the league title. The achievement secured promotion to the V.League 1 for the first time in the club's history. In June 2025, the club adopted the name Ninh Bình, following approval of the rebranding. On 3 July 2025, the club announced the appointment of Spanish coach Gerard Albadalejo and unveiled a new crest inspired by that of the former Vissai Ninh Bình club. The changes reflected the club's ambitions to establish itself in the top division and represent Ninh Bình in Vietnamese professional football.

Ninh Bình entered the 2025–26 V.League 1 season following their promotion, with a squad containing several established Vietnamese internationals. The club made a competitive start to life in the top division and remained among the leading teams throughout the campaign. However, the season also brought managerial changes, with Gerard Albadalejo leaving the position in March 2026. The club subsequently appointed Korean head coach Bae Ji-won before naming Chu Đình Nghiêm as head coach in May 2026. Ninh Bình finished third in the league with 51 points from 26 matches, marking a successful return to the top tier after several years in the lower divisions.

Ninh Bình also reached the final of the 2025–26 Vietnamese Cup. After defeating Hải Phòng in the round of 16, the club progressed past PVF-CAND in the quarter-finals with a 3–2 victory and beat Thể Công–Viettel 4–1 in the semi-finals. The final was played at Ninh Bình Stadium on 14 June 2026 against Công An Hồ Chí Minh City. Despite playing at home, Ninh Bình lost 2–1, with Geovane scoring their only goal from the penalty spot. The club therefore finished the season as Vietnamese Cup runners-up, in addition to their third-place league finish.

== Stadium ==
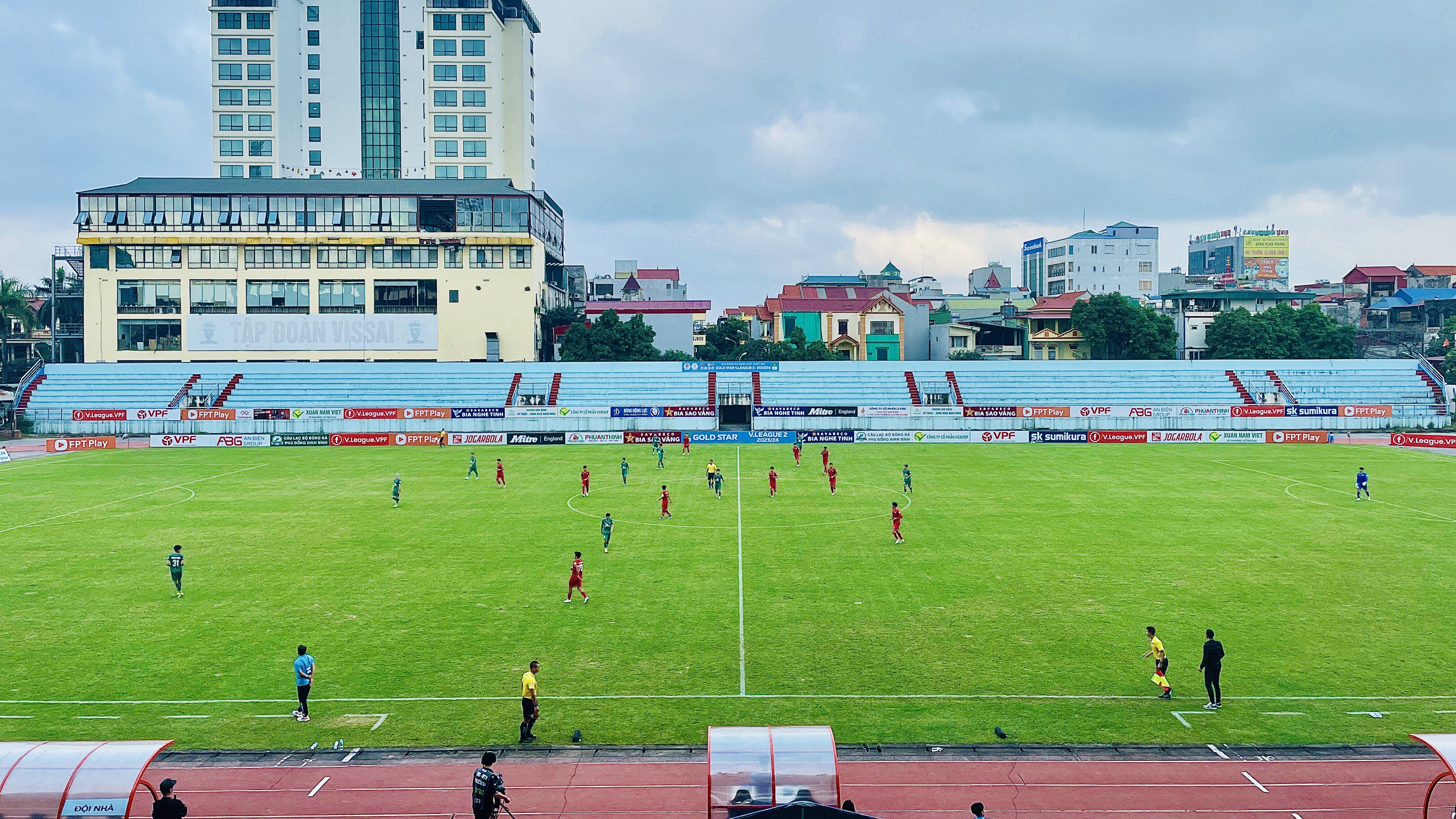
Ninh Bình Stadium

Ninh Bình play their home matches at Ninh Bình Stadium (Vietnamese: Sân vận động Ninh Bình), located in Ninh Bình. The stadium was opened in 2003 and was previously known as Tràng An Stadium. It has formerly served as the home ground of Vissai Ninh Bình, which competed in V.League 1 before withdrawing from professional football in 2014. Ninh Bình began using the venue following the club's relocation to the province in 2023. The stadium underwent renovation in 2021 and returned to prominence as a venue for professional football.

The stadium subsequently became an important part of the club's development as it progressed through the Vietnamese league system. Its use by Ninh Bình continued following the club's rebranding and investment, with the ground serving as the venue for its home fixtures in domestic competitions.

== Kit suppliers and shirt sponsors ==
Period	Kit manufacturer	Shirt sponsor
2015–2019	(Vietnam) Ugether	Mitsubishi Motors; Xuân Nam Việt Corp.
2019–2022	(China) Li-Ning	Mitsubishi Motors; Xuân Nam Việt Corp.
2022–2023	(Vietnam) Kamito	Mitsubishi Motors; Xuân Nam Việt Corp.
2023–2024	(England) Mitre	Phú An Thịnh Group
2024–2025	(Vietnam) Vloop	LPBank
2025–present	(Thailand) Grand Sport	LPBank

== Players ==
=== Current squad ===
As of 4 September 2026

Note: Flags indicate national team as defined under FIFA eligibility rules; some limited exceptions apply. Players may hold more than one non-FIFA nationality.

No.	Pos.	Nation	Player
1	GK	VIE	Đặng Văn Lâm
2	DF	VIE	Hoàng Thái Bình
4	DF	VIE	Hồ Tấn Tài
5	FW	NGR	Fred Friday
6	DF	VIE	Đỗ Thanh Thịnh
7	MF	VIE	Nguyễn Đức Chiến
8	MF	VIE	Trần Thành Trung
9	FW	BRA	Lucão do Break
11	MF	VIE	Lê Văn Thuận
14	MF	VIE	Nguyễn Đức Việt
15	MF	VIE	Trần Bảo Toàn
16	FW	VIE	Nguyễn Lê Phát (on loan from PVF)
17	DF	VIE	Lê Ngọc Bảo
18	FW	VIE	Phạm Gia Hưng
21	MF	VIE	Nguyễn Thái Sơn

No.	Pos.	Nation	Player
22	MF	BRA	Marciel
24	FW	VIE	Nguyễn Ngọc Mỹ
25	GK	VIE	Quàng Thế Tài
26	DF	VIE	Lê Hải Đức
27	MF	VIE	La Nguyễn Bảo Trung
28	MF	VIE	Nguyễn Hoàng Đức
33	DF	VIE	Nguyễn Quốc Khánh (on loan from PVF)
41	MF	VIE	Đỗ Văn Thuận
55	MF	BRA	Romeu
66	DF	VIE	Trương Tiến Anh
86	DF	VIE	Dụng Quang Nho
88	GK	VIE	Nguyễn Minh Đức
94	MF	VIE	Nguyễn Tài Lộc
96	DF	BRA	Lucas Turci
99	FW	VIE	Nguyễn Quốc Việt

=== Unregistered players ===
Note: Flags indicate national team as defined under FIFA eligibility rules; some limited exceptions apply. Players may hold more than one non-FIFA nationality.

No.	Pos.	Nation	Player
30	DF	VIE	Nguyễn Gia Bảo
31	MF	VIE	Lê Đức Phát
56	MF	VIE	Trần Quang Vinh

No.	Pos.	Nation	Player
58	GK	VIE	Phạm Huy Hoàng (on loan from PVF)
71	DF	VIE	Lê Thế Thắng

=== Out on loan ===
Note: Flags indicate national team as defined under FIFA eligibility rules; some limited exceptions apply. Players may hold more than one non-FIFA nationality.

No.	Pos.	Nation	Player
20	FW	VIE	Nay Di Đan (to Hoàng Anh Gia Lai until 1 July 2027)
23	DF	VIE	Dụng Quang Vinh (to Hoàng Anh Gia Lai until 1 July 2027)
92	GK	THA	Phong Chaloongphum (to Hoàng Anh Gia Lai until 1 July 2027)
—	DF	VIE	Hà Châu Phi (to Hoàng Anh Gia Lai until 1 July 2027)

== Management and staff ==
=== Coaching staff ===
As of 26 May 2026

Position	Name
Head coach	(Vietnam) Chu Đình Nghiêm
Assistant coach	(Vietnam) Đặng Hồng Trường (Vietnam) Lê Bật Hiếu (Vietnam) Nguyễn Tiến Dũng (Vietnam) Trần Duy Quang
Goalkeeper coach	(Spain) Alejandro Salvador Velasco (Vietnam) Đinh Xuân Việt
Fitness coach	(Australia) Andrew Devine
Team manager	(Vietnam) Nguyễn Quốc Trạng
Doctor	(Brazil) Jean Carvalho (Vietnam) Đinh Văn Văn (Vietnam) Trần Công Định
Physiotherapist	(Vietnam) Nguyễn Quốc Quân (Vietnam) Nguyễn Văn Khánh
Kit manager	(Vietnam) Nguyễn Thế Anh
Interpreter	(Vietnam) Hoàng Minh Đức

== Managerial history ==
Name	Period	Achievements
(Vietnam) Nguyễn Ngọc Dũng	2015	
(Vietnam) Lê Đức Tuấn	2016–2019	2016 Third Division; 2018 Second Division
(Vietnam) Nguyễn Trung Kiên	2019–2022	2020 Second Divisioon
(Vietnam) Nguyễn Quốc Bình	2022	
(Vietnam) Nguyễn Văn Đàn	2023–2024	
(Vietnam) Nguyễn Việt Thắng	2024–2025	2024–25 V.League 2
(Spain) Gerard Albadalejo	2025–2026	
(Vietnam) Vũ Tiến Thành (caretaker)	2026	
(South Korea) Bae Ji-won	2026	
(Vietnam) Chu Đình Nghiêm	2026–present	

== Honours ==
=== National competitions ===
League

- V.League 1

(bronze) Third place : 2025-26

- V.League 2

(gold) Winners : 2024–25

- Second Division

(gold) Winners : 2018, 2020

- Third Division

(gold) Winners : 2016

Cup

- Vietnamese Cup

(silver) Runners-up : 2025-26

== Award winners ==
=== Domestic ===
- Player of the Season
  - (Vietnam) Nguyễn Hoàng Đức (2025–26) (V.League 2)
- Manager of the Season
  - (Vietnam) Nguyễn Việt Thắng (2024–25) (V.League 2)

== Season by season record ==
Season	League	Pld	Won	Draw	Lost	GF	GA	GD	Pts	Final position	Notes
2015	Third Division	5	1	2	2	2	4	-2	5	5th (Group A)	
2016	Third Division	3	2	1	0	6	1	+5	7	1st (Group A)	Promoted to Second Division
2017	Second Division	14	4	4	6	19	21	-2	16	6th (Group A)	
2018	Second Division	12	8	3	1	26	6	+20	27	2nd (Group A)	Promoted to V.League 2 as play-off winners
2019	V.League 2	22	5	4	13	22	36	-14	19	12th	Relegated to Second Division
2020	Second Division	12	6	3	3	16	14	+2	21	2nd (Group A)	Promoted to V.League 2 as play-off winners
2021	V.League 2	6	3	2	1	5	1	+4	11	4th	Season abandoned
2022	V.League 2	22	5	3	14	21	44	-23	18	11th	
2023	V.League 2	18	4	7	7	16	21	-5	19	7th	
2023–24	V.League 2	20	7	7	6	17	20	-3	28	5th	
2024–25	V.League 2	20	19	1	0	40	3	+37	58	1st	Promoted to V.League 1
2025–26	V.League 1	26	15	6	5	53	31	+22	51	3rd	
2026–27	V.League 1	26									
