= Nguyễn Hữu Khôi =

Vietnamese footballer

Personal information
- Full name: Nguyễn Hữu Khôi
- Date of birth: 1 April 1991 (age 35)
- Place of birth: Kiến Xương, Thái Bình, Vietnam
- Height: 1.73 m (5 ft 8 in)
- Position: Winger

Team information
- Current team: Đồng Tháp
- Number: 33

Youth career
- 2005–2009: Nam Định

Senior career*
Years	Team	Apps	(Gls)
2010–2016	Nam Định	93	(28)
2017	Đắk Lắk	9	(2)
2018	Siheung Citizen	19	(5)
2019	Khánh Hòa	12	(3)
2020	Than Quảng Ninh	4	(0)
2021	Hải Phòng	10	(0)
2022–2024	Khánh Hòa	36	(4)
2024–2025	Trường Tươi Bình Phước	16	(4)
2025–	Đồng Tháp	30	(9)
- * Club domestic league appearances and goals as of 6 June 2026

Nguyễn Hữu Khôi (born 1 April 1991) is a Vietnamese professional footballer who plays as a winger for V.League 2 club Đồng Tháp.

== Career ==
Hữu Khôi started his career with Vietnamese third tier side Nam Định. Before the 2017 season, he signed for Đắk Lắk in the Vietnamese second division. Before the 2018 season, Nguyễn signed for South Korean fifth division club Siheung Citizen FC, helping them win the league.

Before the 2019 season, Hữu Khôi signed for Khánh Hòa in the Vietnamese top flight, where he suffered relegation and made 12 league appearances and scored 3 goals. On 7 July 2019, he debuted for Khánh Hòa during a 1-3 loss to Thanh Hóa. He scored his first goal for Khánh Hòa during a 1-3 loss to Thanh Hóa. In 2021, Hữu Khôi returned to Khánh Hòa, playing in the V.League 2.
