= Nguyễn Việt Thắng =

Vietnamese footballer (born 1981)

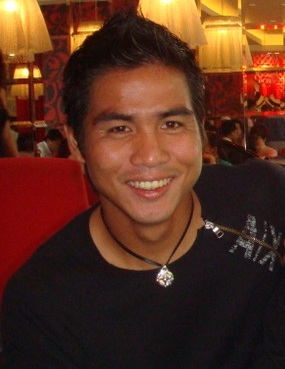
- Việt Thắng in 2008

Personal information
- Full name: Nguyễn Việt Thắng
- Date of birth: 13 September 1981 (age 45)
- Place of birth: Tân An, Long An, Vietnam
- Height: 1.77 m (5 ft 10 in)
- Position: Striker

Senior career*
Years	Team	Apps	(Gls)
1998–2001	Công An Hồ Chí Minh City		
2002–2003	Hoàng Anh Gia Lai		
2005–2009	Đồng Tâm Long An	60	(32)
2005	→ Porto B (loan)	2	(0)
2010–2011	XM The Vissai Ninh Bình	39	(19)
2011–2013	Becamex Bình Dương	8	(0)
2012	→ Thanh Hóa (loan)	13	(2)
2012–2013	→ Đồng Tâm Long An (loan)	18	(10)
2013–2014	Đồng Tâm Long An	12	(3)

International career
2001–2003	Vietnam U23	8	(3)
2001–2012	Vietnam	37	(3)

Managerial career
- 2014–2019: PVF
- 2019–2021: SHB Đà Nẵng (assistant)
- 2022: Cần Thơ
- 2022–2024: Vietnam (assistant)
- 2023–2024: Vietnam U23 (assistant)
- 2024–2025: Phù Đổng Ninh Bình
- 2025–: Trường Tươi Bình Phước
Medal record
Men's football
Representing Vietnam
AFF Championship
Winner	2008 Indonesia–Thailand
- * Club domestic league appearances and goals

Nguyễn Việt Thắng (born 13 September 1981) is a Vietnamese professional football manager and former player who is the head coach of V.League 2 side Trường Tươi Bình Phước.

== Club career ==
Thắng was one of the talent of Vietnam football after being found Ho Chi Minh City Police F.C. In 2002, he moved to Hoàng Anh Gia Lai after spending 3 years playing for the club.

In 2003, he was believed to participate in a match-fixing scandal with another Hoàng Anh Gia Lai player in 2003 ASEAN Club Championship. Vietnam Football Federation decided to ban him from all domestic league for 3 years. In 2006, he came back and played for Đồng Tâm Long An F.C.

During the time he was banned by the Vietnam Football Federation in 2005, he was sent to F.C. Porto B for training so that he could prepare for his returning to play in V-League.

== International career ==
Việt Thắng was chosen to play for the national team in 2002 FIFA World Cup qualification along with other stars such as Lê Huỳnh Đức. However, two years later, because of the ban from the federation, he could not play for the national team for 3 years.

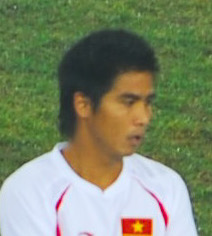
Việt Thắng at the 2008 AFF Suzuki Cup

In 2007, Việt Thắng returned to the national team but he missed the 2007 AFC Asian Cup. In 2008, he was chosen to play in 2008 AFF Suzuki Cup. He is the partner of striker Le Cong Vinh in the starting line-up at the tournament. He finished the tournament with one goal and one assist.

#	Date	Venue	Opponent	Score	Result	Competition
1.	December 15, 2008	Shenyang, China	China U23	3–2	Loss	Friendly
2.	November 16, 2008	Hanoi, Vietnam	Thailand	2–2	Draw	T&T Cup 2008
3.	December 10, 2008	Phuket, Thailand	Laos	4–0	Won	2008 AFF Suzuki Cup

== Honours ==
=== As player ===
Công An Hồ Chí Minh City

- Vietnamese National Cup: 1998, 2000–01

Hoàng Anh Gia Lai

- V-League: 2001–02, 2003

Đồng Tâm Long An

- V-League: 2006
- Vietnamese Super Cup: 2005

Vietnam

- AFF Championship: 2008

=== As manager ===
Phù Đổng Ninh Bình

- V.League 2: 2024–25

Trường Tươi Đồng Nai

- V.League 2: 2025–26

Individual

- V.League 2 Manager of the Season: 2024–25, 2025–26
