= Văn Lang University =

Private university in Ho Chi Minh City, Viet Nam

Van Lang University
- Trường Đại học Văn Lang
- Motto: Where Impact Matters
- Type: Private
- Established: 1995
- Chancellor: Associate Prof. Dr. Trần Thị Mỹ Diệu
- Location: 80/68 Dương Quảng Hàm, An Nhơn (Gò Vấp district) (Gate 1; Official address); 69/68 Đặng Thuỳ Trâm Street, Bình Lợi Trung (Bình Thạnh district) (Gate 2), Ho Chi Minh City, Viet Nam; 10.7634°N 106.6932°E
- Campus: Urban
- Website: www.vlu.edu.vn/en

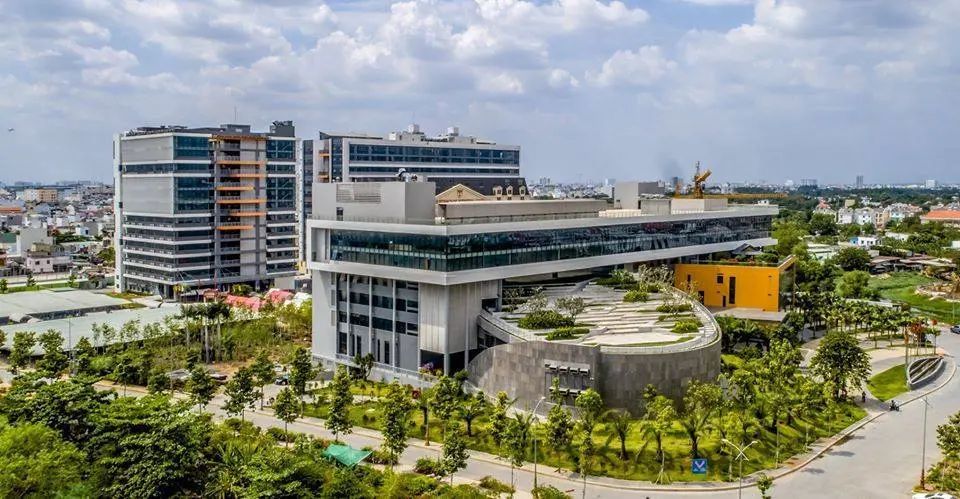
University building Main Campus

Van Lang University (abbreviated as VLU; Vietnamese: Trường Đại học Văn Lang) is one of the first private universities in Vietnam under the administration of the Ministry of Education of Vietnam (MOET). It is located in Ho Chi Minh City since 1995 and was named for the ancient Vietnamese kingdom, Văn Lang.

== Campuses ==
Besides the main campus in Gò Vấp, the university has two additional campuses that have been operational since the early 2000s.

- Campus 1: 45 Nguyễn Khắc Nhu Street, Cô Giang Ward (now is Cầu Ông Lãnh Ward), District 1, Ho Chi Minh City

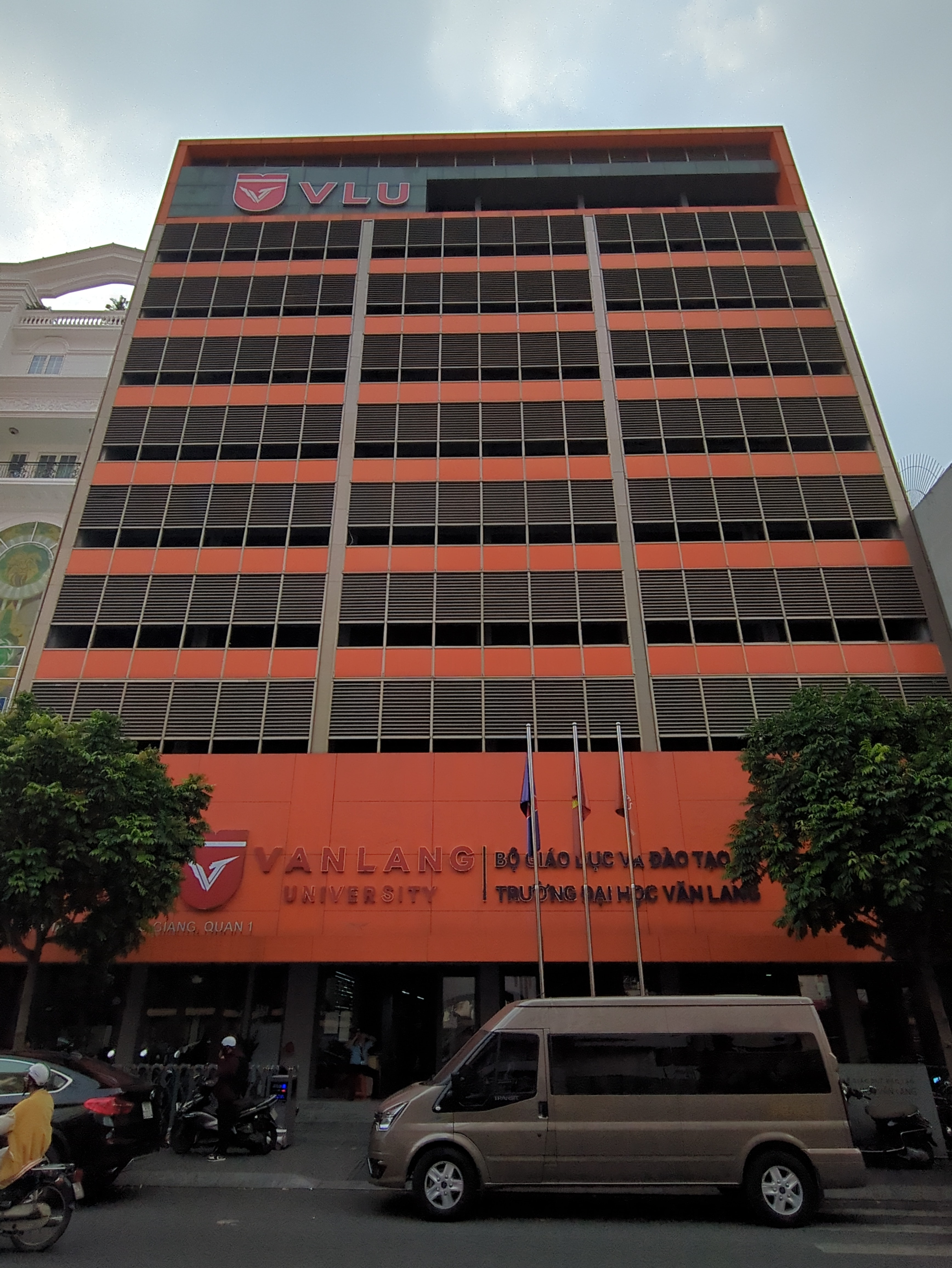
Campus 1 building

Opened in 1999, this campus is the first workplace of the university. After 20 years, in 2019, the campus was renovated and now it is a 9-story building on a 1,224 m² ground area with construction floor area nearly 10,000 m² Currently, the campus is the place of study for the faculties: Foreign Languages, Architecture and Laws.

- Campus 2: 233A Phan Văn Trị Street, Bình Thạnh District

Inaugurated in 2003, Campus 2 used to be the venue for the university's major events. After renovation, it is now the place where most medical students study, and at the same time focuses on developing the school-hospital model. International Hospital, Van Lang Healthcare General Clinic are also located here.

== Structure ==
Văn Lang includes the following faculties:

- Faculty of Foreign Languages
- Faculty of Korean Language and Culture
- Faculty of Law
- Faculty of Architecture
- Faculty of Civil Construction
- Faculty of Environment and Biotechnology
- Faculty of Medicine
- Faculty of Traditional Medicine
- Faculty of Pharmacy
- Faculty of Nursing and Medical Technology
- Faculty of Oral and Dental Medicine
- Faculty of Information Technology
- Faculty of Electrical and Computer Engineering
- Faculty of Industrial Arts
- Faculty of Fine Arts and Design
- Faculty of Applied Arts
- Faculty of Public Relations and Media Communication
- Faculty of Humanities and Social Sciences
- Faculty of Finance and Banking
- Faculty of Accounting and Auditing
- Faculty of Commerce
- Faculty of Business Administration
- Faculty of Tourism
- Faculty of Basic Science
- Faculty of Safety Technology
- Faculty of Creative Technology
- Faculty of Cinematic Arts and Theater
- Faculty of Automotive Engineering Technology

It also includes the following institutes:

- Institute of Culture, Arts and Media
- Institute of Postgraduate Education
- Institute of Applied Science and Technology
- Institute of International Education
- Institute of English Language
- Institute of Văn Lang Heritage
- Institute of Advanced Science and Technology
- Institute of Advanced Materials and Technology
- Institute of Computational Science and Artificial Intelligence
- Research Institute of Cultural Heritage and Development
