= 2021 V.League 2 =

V.League 2
- Logo used in 2021 and 2022 season
- Season: 2021
- Dates: 19 March 2021 – 6 May 2021 (Remaining matches cancelled)
- Champions: Not awarded
- Promoted: Not promoted
- Relegated: Not relegated
- Matches: 41
- Goals: 71 (1.73 per match)
- Top goalscorer: Nguyen Anh Duc; Tran Van Tung (5 goals)
- Biggest home win: Quang Nam 5–2 Can Tho Capital (17 April 2021)
- Biggest away win: Can Tho Capital 0–3 Ba Ria Vung Tau (30 April 2021)
- Highest scoring: Quang Nam 5–2 Can Tho Capital (17 April 2021)
- Longest winning run: 4 matches (Khanh Hoa)
- Longest unbeaten run: 7 matches (Khanh Hoa)
- Longest winless run: 7 matches (An Giang)
- Longest losing run: 3 matches (An Giang, Pho Hien)
- Total attendance: 44,600 (excluding matches played behind closed doors)
- Average attendance: 1,352
- All statistics correct as of 6 May 2021.

The 2021 V.League 2, known as the LS V.League 2 for sponsorship reasons, was the 27th season of V.League 2, Vietnam's second tier professional football league.

The season was suspended on 6 May 2021 due to an outbreak of a new highly contagious variant of the coronavirus in the country. It was announced in August that the season would resume on 20 November 2021. However, all V.League clubs voted on 21 August to cancel the season. There will not be promotion/relegation since the season was abandoned.

== Teams ==
=== Team changes ===
▲ from League Two	▲ to V.League 1	▼ from V.League 1	▼ to League Two
Cong An Nhan Dan; Phu Dong; Phu Tho	Binh Dinh	Quang Nam	Dong Thap

Withdrawn

- XM Fico Tay Ninh
- Gia Dinh (Replaced by Cong An Nhan Dan)

=== Stadia and locations ===
Locations of the 2021 V.League 2 teams

Note: Table lists in alphabetical order.

Team	Location	Stadium	Capacity	2020 Position
An Giang	Rach Gia	Kien Giang	10,000	6th
Ba Ria Vung Tau	Ba Ria	Ba Ria	8,000	2nd
Binh Phuoc	Dong Xoai	Binh Phuoc	10,000	5th
Can Tho Capital	Can Tho (Ninh Kieu)	Can Tho	30,000	8th
Cong An Nhan Dan	Pleiku	Pleiku	12,000	3rd (SD)
Dak Lak	Buon Ma Thuot	Buon Ma Thuot	25,000	10th
Hue	Hue	Tu Do	16,000	9th
Khanh Hoa	Nha Trang	18/9	18,000	3rd
Long An	Tan An	Long An	20,000	11th
Pho Hien	Van Giang	PVF	4,500	4th
Phu Dong	Hanoi (Thanh Tri)	Thanh Tri	4,000	1st (SD)
Phu Tho	Viet Tri	Viet Tri	18,000	1st (SD)
Quang Nam	Tam Ky	Tam Ky	15,000	14th (VL1)

=== Number of teams by region ===
Number	Region	Team(s)
3	Mekong Delta	An Giang, Can Tho Capital and Long An
2	Central Highlands	Cong An Nhan Dan and Dak Lak
2	Red River Delta	Pho Hien and Phu Dong
2	South Central	Khanh Hoa and Quang Nam
2	Southeast	Ba Ria Vung Tau and Binh Phuoc
1	North Central	Hue
1	Northeast	Phu Tho

=== Personnel and kits ===
Team	Manager	Captain	Kit manufacturer	Shirt sponsor
An Giang	(Vietnam) Trinh Van Hau	(Vietnam) Nguyen Van Trong	Egan	
Ba Ria Vung Tau	(Vietnam) Tran Minh Chien	(Vietnam) Vo Hoang Quang	Masu	SCG
Binh Phuoc	(Vietnam) Van Sy Son	(Vietnam) Huynh Van Ly	Made by club	
Can Tho	(Vietnam) Nguyen Huu Dang	(Vietnam) Dao Van Phong	Masu	
Cong An Nhan Dan	(Vietnam) Vu Quang Bao	(Vietnam) Tran Thanh Son	Mitre	Ca phe Ong Bau
Dak Lak	(Vietnam) Truong Minh Tien	(Vietnam) Danh Luong Thuc	Demenino Sport	
Hue	(Vietnam) Nguyen Duc Dung	(Vietnam) Nguyen Tien Tao	Adidas (fake)	
Khanh Hoa	(Vietnam) Vo Dinh Tan	(Vietnam) Nguyen Tan Dien	Kamito	
Long An	(Vietnam) Phan Van Giau	(Vietnam) Nguyen Anh Duc	Made by club	Cang Long An, Dong Tam Group
Pho Hien	(Vietnam) Hua Hien Vinh	(Vietnam) Le Ngoc Bao	Grand Sport	Văn Lang University
Phu Dong	(Vietnam) Nguyen Trung Kien	(Vietnam) Le Quang Dai	Li-Ning	Mitsubishi Motors
Phu Tho	(Vietnam) Vu Nhu Thanh	(Vietnam) Nguyen The Duong	Donex Sport	Donex Sport
Quang Nam	(Vietnam) Duong Hong Son	(Vietnam) Dinh Thanh Trung	Grand Sport	

=== Managerial changes ===
Team	Outgoing manager	Manner of departure	Date of vacancy	Position in table	Incoming manager	Date of appointment
Phu Tho	(Vietnam) Duong Hong Son	Mutual consent	January 2021	Pre-season	(Vietnam) Vu Nhu Thanh	28 January 2021
Cong An Nhan Dan	(Vietnam) Pham Cong Loc	Promoted to Technical Director	30 March 2021	4th	(Vietnam) Vu Quang Bao	30 March 2021
Quang Nam	(Vietnam) Nguyen Thanh Cong	Sacked	11 April 2021	12th	(Vietnam) Duong Hong Son	11 April 2021

== First phase ==
=== Table ===
Pos	Team	Pld	W	D	L	GF	GA	GD	Pts
1	Khanh Hoa	7	4	3	0	8	2	+6	15
2	Ba Ria Vung Tau	6	4	1	1	8	4	+4	13
3	Long An	7	3	3	1	5	2	+3	12
4	Phu Dong	6	3	2	1	5	1	+4	11
5	Dak Lak	6	2	3	1	7	5	+2	9
6	Cong An Nhan Dan	6	2	3	1	7	6	+1	9
7	Hue	6	1	5	0	6	4	+2	8
8	Can Tho Capital	6	2	1	3	5	10	−5	7
9	Quang Nam	7	1	3	3	7	8	−1	6
10	Phu Tho	6	1	3	2	3	4	−1	6
11	Binh Phuoc	6	1	3	2	6	8	−2	6
12	Pho Hien	6	0	3	3	2	6	−4	3
13	An Giang	7	0	1	6	2	11	−9	1

Updated to match(es) played on 6 May 2021. Source: VPF
Rules for classification: 1) Points; 2) Head-to-head points; 3) Head-to-head goal difference; 4) Head-to-head goals scored; 5) Goal difference; 6) Goals scored.

==== Positions by round ====
Team ╲ Round	1	2	3	4	5	6
An Giang	12	13	13	13	13	13
Ba Ria Vung Tau	1	2	3	3	2	2
Binh Phuoc	9	11	10	9	10	11
Can Tho Capital	6	9	11	6	9	10
Cong An Nhan Dan	3	4	5	8	6	6
Dak Lak	8	5	4	4	3	4
Hue	4	7	6	7	8	7
Khanh Hoa	2	1	1	1	1	1
Long An	5	3	2	2	4	5
Pho Hien	7	6	7	10	11	12
Phu Dong	11	10	8	5	5	3
Phu Tho	13	12	12	11	12	9
Quang Nam	10	8	9	12	7	8

Qualification to Promotion Group
Qualification to Relegation Group

Updated to match(es) played on 2 May 2021. Source: Table by round (in Vietnamese)

=== Results ===
Home \ Away	ANG	BRV	BIN	CTC	CND	DAK	HUE	KHA	LAN	PHO	PHD	PHT	QNA
An Giang		0–1	1–1			1–2 (Note: Played behind closed doors due to COVID-19 outbreak in Ho Chi Minh City.)			0–1	–		–	
Ba Ria Vung Tau			1–3			–	1–1			–		1–0	–
Binh Phuoc				–	2–2	0–2		–				–	0–0
Can Tho Capital	–	0–3			1–1		–			1–0	1–0		
Cong An Nhan Dan	1–0	–				1–1	– (Note: Cancelled due to COVID-19 outbreak.)		–		–		–
Dak Lak				–			1–1	–	0–0	–		1–2	
Hue	–		–					1–1	–		0–0		3–1
Khanh Hoa	2–0	–		–	2–0					1–1	–		
Long An		0–1	2–0	1–0				0–0			–		–
Pho Hien			–	–	0–2		–		1–1		0–1	–	
Phu Dong	3–0	–	–			–						0–0	1–0
Phu Tho				–	–		0–0	0–1	–				1–1
Quang Nam	–			5–2	–	–		0–1		0–0			

Updated to match(es) played on 6 May 2021. Source: vpf.vn
Legend: Blue = home team win; Yellow = draw; Red = away team win.

==== Season progress ====
Team ╲ Round	1	2	3	4	5	6	7
An Giang	L	L	L	D	L	L	L
Ba Ria Vung Tau	W	W	D	X	W	W	L
Binh Phuoc	D	L	D	D	L	X	W
Can Tho Capital	D	X	L	W	L	L	W
Cong An Nhan Dan	D	D	D	L	W	W	X
Dak Lak	D	D	W	D	W	L	X
Hue	D	D	D	D	D	W	X
Khanh Hoa	W	W	W	W	D	D	D
Long An	D	W	W	D	L	D	W
Pho Hien	D	D	X	L	L	L	D
Phu Dong	X	D	D	W	W	W	L
Phu Tho	L	L	D	D	X	W	D
Quang Nam	D	D	L	L	W	L	D

Updated to match(es) played on 6 May 2021. Source: VPF
W = Win; D = Draw; L = Lose; X = Did not play

== Season statistics ==
=== Top scorers ===
As of 6 May 2021

Rank	Player	Club	Goals
1	(Vietnam) Nguyen Anh Duc	Long An	5
1	(Vietnam) Tran Van Tung	Khanh Hoa	5
3	(Vietnam) Phu Trung Phong	Ba Ria Vung Tau	4
4	(Vietnam) Duong Van An	Can Tho Capital	3
4	(Vietnam) Le Minh Binh	Cong An Nhan Dan	3
6	(Vietnam) Danh Luong Thuc	Dak Lak	2
6	(Vietnam) Ho Thanh Minh	Hue	2
6	(Vietnam) Nguyen Huu Son	Quang Nam	2
6	(Vietnam) Tran Le Duy	Khanh Hoa	2
10	40 players		1

=== Clean sheets ===
Rank	Player	Club	Clean sheets
1	(Vietnam) Le Quang Dai	Phu Dong	5
1	(Vietnam) Nguyen Tien Anh	Long An	5
3	(Vietnam) Tran The Kiet	Khanh Hoa	3
4	(Vietnam) Ngo Van Nhut	Dak Lak	2
4	(Vietnam) Nguyen Thanh Tuan	Ba Ria Vung Tau	2
4	(Vietnam) Nguyen Tien Tao	Hue	2
4	(Vietnam) Pham Van Tien	Ba Ria Vung Tau	2
4	(Vietnam) Quan Van Chuan	Pho Tho	2
4	(Vietnam) Tran Van Chien	Quang Nam	2
4	(Vietnam) Vo Ngoc Cuong	Khanh Hoa	2
