= Vũ Như Thành =

Vietnamese footballer (born 1981)

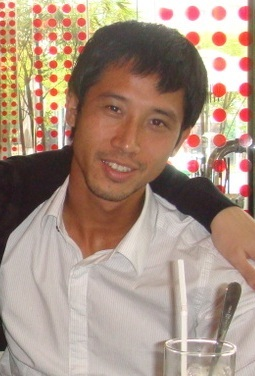

Personal information
- Date of birth: 28 August 1981 (age 45)
- Place of birth: Mỹ Lộc, Nam Định, Vietnam
- Height: 1.82 m (6 ft 0 in)
- Position: Centre-back

Team information
- Current team: Phú Thọ (head coach)

Youth career
- 1997–2000: Thể Công

Senior career*
| Years | Team | Apps | (Gls) |
| 2001–2004 | Thể Công | 40 | (3) |
| 2007–2009 | Becamex Bình Dương | 19 | (1) |
| 2010–2012 | Vissai Ninh Bình | 11 | (0) |
| 2013 | Hải Phòng | 11 | (0) |
| 2014 | Hùng Vương An Giang | 19 | (0) |
| 2014–2016 | XM Fico Tây Ninh | 11 | (0) |
| 2017–2018 | Phù Đổng | 14 | (0) |
| Total | | 125 | (4) |

International career
| 2001–2003 | Vietnam U23 | 40 | (1) |
| 2003–2010 | Vietnam | 50 | (2) |

Managerial career
- 2021–2023: Phú Thọ
- 2023: Công An Hà Nội (assistant)
- 2024: Phú Thọ
- * Club domestic league appearances and goals

Vũ Như Thành (born 28 August 1981) Vietnamese football coach and former professional player who is currently the head coach of V.League 2 club Phú Thọ.

He was a member of the Vietnam team that won the 2008 AFF Championship.

== Coaching career ==
=== Phú Thọ ===
Vũ Như Thành was appointed manager of V.League 2 club Phú Thọ in January 2021. He lost his first V.League 2 match, 1–0 at home to Khánh Hòa on 20 March. On 1 May, Thành won his first competitive game as Phú Thọ manager when his side recorded a 2–1 victory against Đắk Lắk.

On 27 May 2023, Thành unexpectedly announced his departure from Phú Thọ, after his side fell into the relegation zone, following a 2–0 away defeat against Phù Đổng the previous day.

=== Công an Hà Nội ===
On 6 June 2023, Thành was appointed an assistant coach at Công an Hà Nội.

=== Return to Phú Thọ ===
In January 2024, Phú Thọ appointed Vũ Như Thành as manager for the second time.

== Career statistics ==
=== International ===
Appearances and goals by national team and year
| National team | Year | Apps | Goals |
|---|---|---|---|
Vietnam
| Vietnam | 2003 | 6 | 0 |
| Vietnam | 2006 | 4 | 0 |
| Vietnam | 2007 | 13 | 0 |
| Vietnam | 2008 | 9 | 0 |
| Vietnam | 2009 | 7 | 1 |
| Vietnam | 2010 | 11 | 1 |
| Total | | 50 | 2 |

Scores and results list Vietnam's goal tally first, score column indicates score after each Thành goal.

List of international goals scored by Vũ Như Thành
| No. | Date | Venue | Opponent | Score | Result | Competition |
|---|---|---|---|---|---|---|
| 1 | 24 October 2009 | Thong Nhat Stadium, Ho Chi Minh City, Vietnam | Singapore | 2–2 | 2–2 | Friendly |
| 2 | 8 October 2010 | Shree Shiv Chhatrapati Sports Complex, Pune, India | India | 1–2 | 1–3 | Friendly |

== Managerial statistics ==
As of match played 18 February 2024

Managerial record by team and tenure
| Team | From | To | Record | | | | | | | |
| Team | From | To | G | W | D | L | GF | GA | GD | Win % |
|---|---|---|---|---|---|---|---|---|---|---|
| Phú Thọ | 20 March 2021 | 26 May 2023 | 36 | 6 | 11 | 19 | 25 | 54 | −29 | 16.67 |
| Phú Thọ | 9 January 2024 | present | 1 | 0 | 0 | 1 | 1 | 2 | −1 | 0.00 |
| Total | | | 37 | 6 | 11 | 20 | 26 | 56 | −30 | 16.22 |

== Honours ==
Becamex Bình Dương

- V.League 1: 2007, 2008
- Vietnamese Super Cup: 2007, 2008

Vietnam

- AFF Championship: 2008
