= Dương Hồng Sơn =

Vietnamese footballer (born 1982)

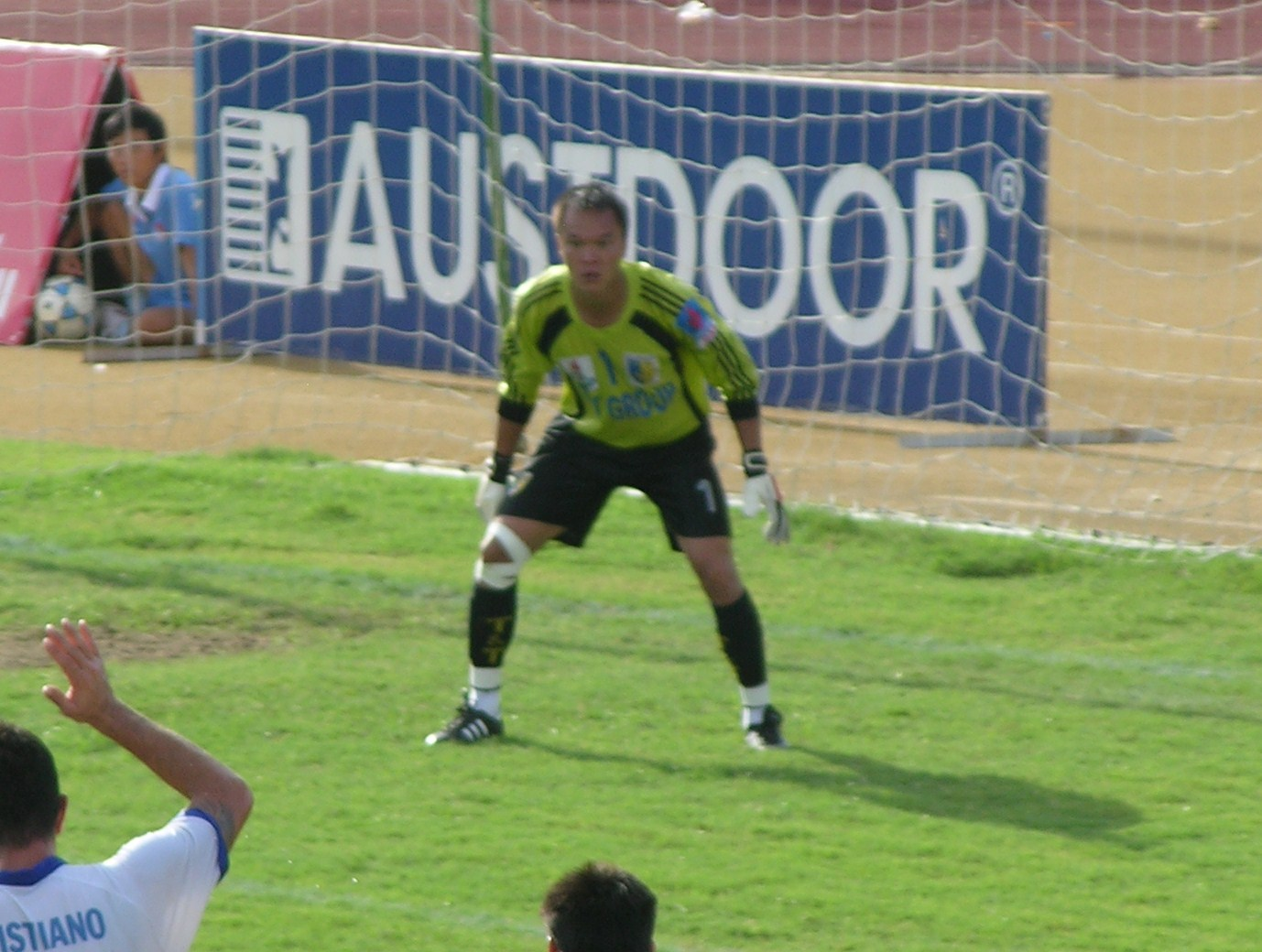
- Duong Hong Son with Hanoi T&T

Personal information
- Full name: Dương Hồng Sơn
- Date of birth: November 20, 1982 (age 43)
- Place of birth: Quỳnh Lưu, Nghệ An, Vietnam
- Height: 1.76 m (5 ft 9 in)
- Position: Goalkeeper

Team information
- Current team: Quang Nam (manager)

Youth career
- 1997–2000: Song Lam Nghe An

Senior career*
Years	Team	Apps	(Gls)
2001–2007	Song Lam Nghe An	206	(0)
2008–2015	Hanoi T&T	95	(1)
Total		301	(1)

International career^{‡}
2000–2003	Vietnam U23	60	(0)
2003–2012	Vietnam	40	(0)

Managerial career
- 2013–2019: Hanoi (assistant)
- 2020–2021: Phu Tho
- 2021: Hanoi (assistant)
- 2021–2022: Quang Nam
- 2022–: Hanoi (assistant)
- * Club domestic league appearances and goals as of 21 June 2021 ‡ National team caps and goals as of 8 December 2021

Dương Hồng Sơn (born November 20, 1982) is a Vietnamese football manager and former player who is the manager of Quang Nam. He is best known for his performance helping the Vietnam national team to win their first ASEAN Championship. He was declared 2008 AFF Suzuki Cup MVP of the tournament.

== Early life ==
Sơn was born in a working family in Quỳnh Lưu, Nghe An. Like many players, Hong Son was passionate about football since he was young. In 1995, he joined Quynh Luu's youth team with the youth team Sông Lam Nghệ An, led by coach Nguyen Van Huy.

== Career ==
=== Song Lam Nghe An ===
Sơn began playing for Song Lam Nghe An. One year later he joined the SLN U14 National Championship. Two years later, along with Phan Thanh Hoan, Chu Ngoc Canh, Nguyen Cong Manh Duong, he won the U16 National Championship.

Sơn was selected to the national U16 team. The coaches were Nguyen Hong Thanh and Nguyen, both belonged to the Song Lam Nghe An.

Nguyen told him, "Little goalkeepers, if hard training, confident and Have the talent to become good goalkeepers." He again moved Sơn to the position of goalkeeper.

In 2002, he was brought to the Hanoi Football Club. After a competitive season, he helped the club qualify.

=== T & T Hanoi ===
In 2007, his Song Lam Nghe An contract expired, and he joined the Hà Nội T&T. The club reached the V-League.

=== National team ===
Sơn was coached by Alfred Riedl for the Asia Cup in 2007. He played well in the subsequent UAE National Football Team competition against the Qatar National Team, In the quarterfinals, they lost to the Iraqi National Team, who then won the championship.

Sơn was voted the best player in the 2008 AFF Suzuki Cup. He made several saves for the Vietnam national football team, especially against the Singapore national football team in the return leg and the next match.

Throughout his career, he was regarded to be the most prominent goalkeeper of Vietnamese national team since rejoining global football at the 1990s.

=== Coach ===
Sơn became a goalkeeping coach and ended his playing career. He later became the goalkeeper for U-19 team of T&T Hanoi Football Club. In 2020 he becomes the head coach for newly formed Phú Thọ Football Club.

== Honours ==
Vietnam

- AFF Championship: 2008

Individual

- AFF Championship MVP: 2008
- Vietnamese Golden Ball: 2008
