= LPBank =

Vietnamese retail bank

- Native name: Ngân hàng Lộc Phát Việt Nam
- Type: Joint-stock
- Industry: Banking and Finance
- Founded: March 28, 2008; 18 years ago
- Headquarters: Hanoi, Vietnam
- Key people: Nguyen Duc Thuy (Chairman); Ho Nam Tien (CEO)
- Total assets: VND 365,000 billion (2023) (equivalent to USD 15 billion)
- Number of employees: 10,600 (As of Nov 30 2023)
- Website: lpbank.com.vn

Fortune Vietnam Joint Stock Commercial Bank or LPBank (previously known as: LienVietBank or LienVietPostBank) is a Vietnamese retail bank based in Hanoi. As of December 31, 2023, LPBank's total assets reached over VND382,953 billion, up 17% from the beginning of the year. Market segment 1 mobilization activities reached VND285,342 billion; credit growth reached VND39,686 billion with a rate of 16.83%, in line with the ceiling allowed by the State Bank of Vietnam. As of the end of 2023, LPBank's NPL ratio was 1.26%, lower than the same period (1.45%) and much lower than the third quarter of 2023.

LPBank was granted a license to operate on March 28, 2008 with the original name LienVietBank and officially launched on May 1, 2008 with a charter capital of VND3,300 billion. In 2011, LPBank changed its name to LienVietPostBank.

The year 2023 marks the 15th year of operations, and the bank has updated its brand identity to a simplified, memorable, and easily readable format as LPBank. In July 2024, LPBank will change its name to Fortune Vietnam Joint Stock Commercial Bank.

== Milestones ==
Time	Milestones
2008	Established as LienVietBank and opened the first branch in Hau Giang Province respectively in March and May 2008.
2011	• Signed a 50-year co-operation agreement with Vietnam Post to merge with Vietnam Postal Savings Service Company (VPSC) and changed name to LienVietPostBank.; Became a member of the World Savings & Retail Banking Institute (WSBI).; Moved headquarters to Ho Chi Minh City
2015	Integrated LienVietPostBank’s ATM system into Smartlink.
2016	Officially launched Vi Viet E-wallet – a payment gateway and a financial management tool.; Vi Viet became the winner of the UNCDF SHIFT Challenge Fund Second Window, granted US$325,000 to promote financial inclusion for Vietnamese women.; Moved headquarters to Hanoi
2017	LienVietPostBank is listed on the UPCOM stock exchange as LPB
2020	LPB is listed on HOSE (Ho Chi Minh City Stock Exchange).
2023	Changed abbreviated name to LPBank.; Launched T24 Corebanking Project.
2024	Changed abbreviated name to Fortune Vietnam Joint Stock Commercial Bank.

== Key financial figures ==
Unit: USD million	2013	2014	2015	2016	2017	2018	2021	2022	By end of 3rd Q, 2023
Total Assets	3,784	4,745	4,807	6,402	7,288	7,765	11,920	14,000	15,000
Owners’ Equity	346	348	340	376	419	432	620	710	1,000
Profit before Tax							150	230	150
Revenue							950	1,230	NA
Return on average equity (ROAE) (%)	7.72%	6.36%	4.67%	13.34%	15.45%	11.4%	18.52%	22.08%	NA
Non-performing loans (NPL) (%)	2.48%	1.1%	0.88%	1.08%	1.04%	0.96%	1.24%	1.46%	NA
Dividend payout ratio (%/year)	8.00%	6.00%	4.5%	10%	15%	10%	15%	19%	NA
