= Mauro Jerónimo =

Portuguese football manager

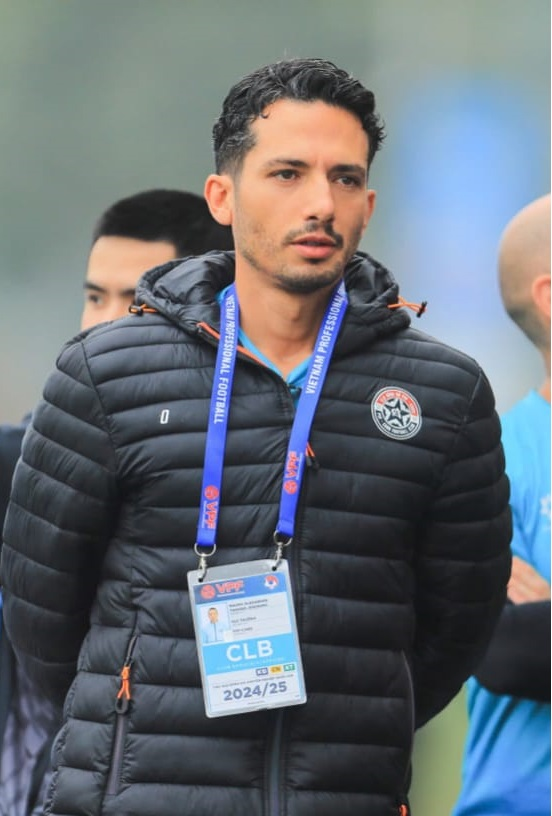
- Jerónimo in 2025

Personal information
- Full name: Mauro Alexandre Tavares Jerónimo
- Date of birth: 27 September 1987 (age 39)
- Place of birth: São Miguel Island, Portugal

Managerial career
- Years: Team
- 2016–2017: Fujian Chaoyue
- 2017: Chinese Taipei U19
- 2022–2025: PVF-CAND
- 2025–2026: Thép Xanh Nam Định
- 2026: Borneo Samarinda

Mauro Alexandre Tavares Jerónimo (born 27 September 1987) is a Portuguese professional football manager.

== Managerial career ==
Jerónimo began his coaching career at the Benfica youth academy, coaching the under-13s and under-15s. He later joined the under-19 coaching staff at Vitória Setubal. This was followed by a spell at Pinhalnovense as assistant coach, gaining his first experience in professional senior football.

Jerónimo's first international role was in China, as head coach of Fujian Chaoyue, a Fujian Super League team. He was then appointed as the head coach of Chinese Taipei under-19 national team. Later he joined PVF in Vietnam in 2018, where he led their U-19 team to win the National U-19 Championship in 2020 and 2021.

=== PVF-CAND ===
In 2022, Jerónimo was appointed head coach of PVF's senior team Phố Hiến (later renamed to PVF-CAND), which competed in the V.League 2. Under his guidance, PVF-CAND finished runners-up in the 2023 and 2023–24 V.League 2, both times missing out promotion to the V.League 1. He also led PVF-CAND to the 2023–24 Vietnamese Cup semi-finals, being the first second-tier team to achieve that in two decades.

=== Nam Định ===
On 14 November 2025, Jerónimo was appointed as the head coach of V.League 1 team Thép Xanh Nam Định, signing a two-year contract with the team.

During this period, the Portuguese coach led the club to qualification for the semi-finals of the ASEAN Club Championship, finishing the group stage in first place and undefeated.

Jerónimo also left his mark in the club's record books by achieving Nam Định's biggest victory ever, defeating Eastern 9–0 in the AFC Champions League 2.

In February, he left the club by mutual agreement with the board.

== Managerial statistics ==
As of 9 November 2026

Managerial record by team and tenure
Team	Nat.	From	To	Record					Ref.
Team	Nat.	From	To	G	W	D	L	Win %	Ref.
PVF-CAND	(Vietnam)	1 January 2022	14 March 2025	82	40	29	13	48.78	
Nam Dinh	(Vietnam)	14 November 2025	26 February 2026	10	5	3	2	50.00	
Borneo Samarinda	(Indonesia)	10 June 2026	9 November 2026	11	5	2	4	45.45	
Career Total				103	50	34	19	48.54	
