= Nha Trang Stadium =

Coordinates: 12°15′02″N 109°11′35″E

19/8 Nha Trang Stadium
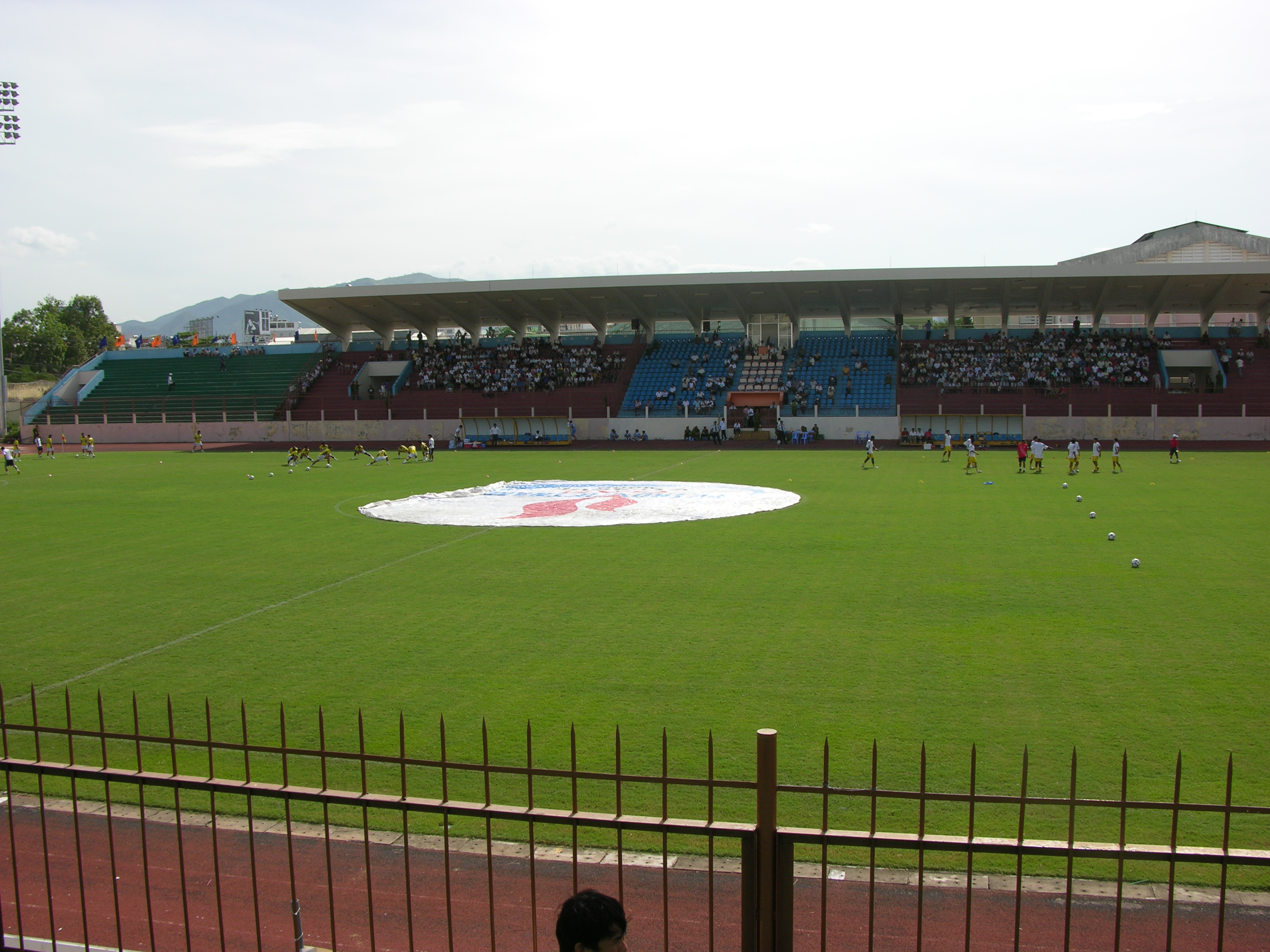
- Interactive map of 19/8 Nha Trang Stadium
- Location: Nha Trang, Vietnam
- Capacity: 25,000

Tenant
- Khanh Hoa FC

The Nha Trang Stadium, or officially 19 August Stadium (Sân vận động 19 tháng 8), is a multi-use stadium in Nha Trang, Vietnam. It is currently used mostly for football matches and is the home stadium of Khanh Hoa FC and hosted the 2016 Asian Beach Games. The stadium holds 25,000 people.
