= Phu Tho FC (2019) =

Vietnamese football club

- Full name: Phu Tho Football Club
- Founded: 2019; 7 years ago
- Dissolved: 2025; 1 year ago
- Ground: Việt Trì Stadium
- Capacity: 20.000
- Owner: Tuan Tu Group
- Manager: Đặng Công Thành
- League: Vietnamese Third Division
- 2025: Vietnamese Second Division, 7th of 7 (Group A, relegated)
| Home colours | Away colours | Third colours |

Phu Tho Football Club (Vietnamese: Câu lạc bộ bóng đá Phú Thọ), is a professional association football club in Việt Trì ward, Phú Thọ, Vietnam. The club play their home matches at Việt Trì Stadium. It last played in the Vietnamese Second Division. and currently compete in the Vietnamese Football League Third Division, the fourth tier of Vietnamese football league system.

== History ==
In October 2019, the Chairman of Phu Tho Provincial People's Committee made a decision to establish Tuan Tu Phu Tho football team to participate in the competition from the Vietnamese National Football Third League. Tuan Tu Phu Tho operates under professional football regulations, register as a member of the Vietnam Football Federation. At the beginning, the team had 25 players aged 18–20 with the core being young players of Song Lam Nghe An. Leading the team is coach Ho Thanh Thuong.

In 2019 Third Division season, Phu Tho FC finished in 2nd place in group A and get promoted to the 2020 V.League 3.

In 2020 Second Division season, with the main squad is from U-21 team of Hanoi FC, they finished the season in 1st place and won against Cong An Nhan Dan in the knockout and get promoted to the 2021 V.League 2.

In 2021 V.League 2, the league was cancelled because of COVID-19. Phu Tho at that time ranked 10th.

In 2022 V.League 2, Phu Tho have escaped relegation by finishing 9th with 21 points.

In 2023 V.League 2, they once again narrowly escaped relegation by finishing 8th out of 10 with 18 points, only two more than the worst ranked team.

In 2023–24 V.League 2 however, they are relegated to Second Division.

On 2 May 2025, FIFA expelled Phu Tho from the 2025 Vietnamese Football League Second Division and demote the team to the Third Division due to match-fixing.

== Kit suppliers and shirt sponsor ==
| Stage | T-shirt maker | Sponsor printed on the shirt |
|---|---|---|
| 2020 | (Vietnam) Egan | none |
| 2021 | (Vietnam) Donex Sport | Donex Sport |
| 2022 | (Vietnam) HP Sport | none |

== Players ==
As of 28 March 2025.

Note: Flags indicate national team as defined under FIFA eligibility rules; some limited exceptions apply. Players may hold more than one non-FIFA nationality.

| No. | Pos. | Nation | Player |
|---|---|---|---|
| 1 | GK | VIE | Ksor Nay Đê Sô |
| 3 | DF | VIE | Nguyễn Tuấn Khanh |
| 4 | DF | VIE | Vũ Trọng Tú |
| 5 | DF | VIE | Nguyễn Đức Tiến |
| 7 | FW | VIE | Hán Trọng Bách |
| 8 | MF | VIE | Đậu Ngọc Mạnh (on loan from Hà Nội) |
| 9 | FW | VIE | Nguyễn Tiến Dũng |
| 10 | MF | VIE | Bùi Huy Hoàng |
| 11 | FW | VIE | Mai Trung Thông |
| 13 | MF | VIE | Giang Đức Quyền (on loan from Thanh Hóa) |
| 15 | DF | VIE | Nguyễn Cao Nguyên |
| 17 | MF | VIE | Dương Văn Quyết (on loan from Hà Nội) |
| 18 | DF | VIE | Nguyễn Mạnh Đình |
| 19 | FW | VIE | Nguyễn Long Nhật (on loan from Hà Nội) |
| 20 | GK | VIE | Trần Nguyễn Gia Bảo |

| No. | Pos. | Nation | Player |
|---|---|---|---|
| 21 | MF | VIE | Lâm Gia Bảo |
| 22 | DF | VIE | Đoàn Thế Phong (on loan from Thể Công-Viettel) |
| 26 | MF | VIE | Hoàng Trung Kiên (on loan from Hà Nội) |
| 27 | DF | VIE | Nguyễn Hữu Trung (on loan from Thể Công-Viettel) |
| 28 | MF | VIE | Đỗ Đình Sơn |
| 29 | DF | VIE | Bùi Văn Dũng |
| 31 | MF | VIE | Bùi Văn Lễ |
| 34 | DF | VIE | Nguyễn Bá Dương (on loan from Thể Công-Viettel) |
| 36 | GK | VIE | Huỳnh Hữu Tuấn |
| 38 | MF | VIE | Lê Sinh Hùng |
| 66 | DF | VIE | Nguyễn Hữu Luân (on loan from Thể Công-Viettel) |
| 75 | FW | VIE | Trần Hữu Minh Trí |
| 82 | MF | VIE | Trần Văn Vẫn (on loan from Hà Nội) |
| 94 | FW | VIE | Đồng Văn Trung |
