= V.League Awards =

Men's Vietnamese Football League awards in Vietnam

The V.League Awards is an award given annually by the Vietnam Professional Football Jointstock Company (known as VPF) for the best players, head coaches, and referees of the V.League 1 and V.League 2.

== Player of the Year ==
=== V.League 1 ===
Season	Player	Nationality	Club
1998	Lê Huỳnh Đức	(Vietnam)	Cong An Ho Chi Minh City
1999–2000	Lê Huỳnh Đức (2)	(Vietnam)	Cong An Ho Chi Minh City
2000–01	Nguyễn Hồng Sơn	(Vietnam)	The Cong
2004	Kiatisuk Senamuang	(Thailand)	Hoang Anh Gia Lai
2005	Kesley Alves	(Brazil)	Becamex Binh Duong
2006 (Note: From 2006 to 2008, the Player of the Year award was given to both the best domestic and best foreign player.)	Elenildo de Jesus Lê Công Vinh	(Brazil) (Vietnam)	Saigon Port; Song Lam Nghe An
2007	Jose Almeida Lê Công Vinh (2)	(Brazil) (Vietnam)	SHB Da Nang; Song Lam Nghe An
2008	Jose Almeida (2) Lê Công Vinh (3)	(Brazil) (Vietnam)	SHB Da Nang; Song Lam Nghe An
2012	Nguyễn Minh Phương	(Vietnam)	SHB Da Nang
2013	Gonzalo Marronkle	(Argentina)	Hanoi T&T
2014	Nguyễn Anh Đức	(Vietnam)	Becamex Binh Duong
2015	Nguyễn Anh Đức (2)	(Vietnam)	Becamex Binh Duong
2016	Gastón Merlo	(Argentina)	SHB Da Nang
2017	Đinh Thanh Trung	(Vietnam)	Quang Nam
2018	Nguyễn Văn Quyết	(Vietnam)	Hanoi FC
2019	Nguyễn Quang Hải	(Vietnam)	Hanoi FC
2020	Nguyễn Văn Quyết (2)	(Vietnam)	Hanoi FC
2022	Nguyễn Văn Quyết (3)	(Vietnam)	Hanoi FC
2023	Nguyễn Hoàng Đức	(Vietnam)	Viettel
2023–24	Rafaelson	(Brazil)	Thep Xanh Nam Dinh
2024–25	Alan Grafite	(Brazil)	Cong An Hanoi
2025–26	Nguyễn Quang Hải (2)	(Vietnam)	Cong An Hanoi

=== V.League 2 ===
Season	Player	Nationality	Club
2022	Lê Thanh Bình	(Vietnam)	Khanh Hoa
2023	Nguyễn Đình Bắc	(Vietnam)	Quang Nam
2023–24	Đặng Anh Tuấn	(Vietnam)	SHB Da Nang
2024–25	Nguyễn Hoàng Đức	(Vietnam)	Phu Dong Ninh Binh
2025–26	Trần Minh Vương	(Vietnam)	Truong Tuoi Dong Nai

== Team of the Season ==
=== V.League 1 ===
Players marked bold won the "Best Player award" in that respective year.

Season	Category			
Season	Goalkeeper	Defenders	Midfielders	Forwards
2013	(Nigeria) Bassey Akpan (Hoang Anh Gia Lai)	(Vietnam) Trần Đình Hoàng (Song Lam Nghe An) (Vietnam) Quế Ngọc Hải (Song Lam Nghe An) (Vietnam) Nguyễn Văn Biển (Hanoi T&T) (Vietnam) Lê Quang Hùng (Vissai Ninh Binh)	(Vietnam) Lê Công Vinh (Song Lam Nghe An) (Trinidad and Tobago) Hughtun Hector (Song Lam Nghe An) (Slovenia) Nastja Čeh (FLC Thanh Hoa) (Vietnam) Phan Tấn Tài (Dong Tam Long An)	(Argentina) Gonzalo Marronkle (Hanoi T&T) (Nigeria) Samson Olaleye (Note: Player got naturalized to become a Vietnamese citizen in October 2013, changing his name from Samson Olaleye to Hoàng Vũ Samson) (Hanoi T&T)
2014	(Vietnam) Nguyễn Quốc Thiện Esele (Becamex Binh Duong)	(Vietnam) Nguyễn Văn Việt (Than Quang Ninh) (Netherlands) Danny Van Bakel (FLC Thanh Hoa) (Vietnam) Nguyễn Huy Cường (Than Quang Ninh) (Vietnam) Âu Văn Hoàn (Becamex Binh Duong)	(Vietnam) Nguyễn Anh Đức (Becamex Binh Duong) (Vietnam) Nguyễn Trọng Hoàng (Becamex Binh Duong) (Vietnam) Hoàng Minh Tâm (SHB Da Nang) (Vietnam) Nguyễn Văn Quyết (Hanoi T&T)	(Senegal) Abass Cheikh Dieng (Becamex Binh Duong) (Vietnam) Hoàng Vũ Samson (Hanoi T&T)
2015	(Vietnam) Huỳnh Tuấn Linh (Than Quang Ninh)	(Vietnam) Nguyễn Xuân Thành (Becamex Binh Duong) (Netherlands) Danny Van Bakel (FLC Thanh Hoa) (Vietnam) Hoàng Vissai (QNK Quang Nam) (Vietnam) Lê Đức Tuấn (FLC Thanh Hoa)	(Vietnam) Phạm Thành Lương (Hanoi T&T) (Uganda) Moses Oloya (Becamex Binh Duong) (Vietnam) Đinh Thanh Trung (QNK Quang Nam) (Vietnam) Nguyễn Văn Quyết (Hanoi T&T)	(Vietnam) Hoàng Đình Tùng (FLC Thanh Hoa) (Vietnam) Nguyễn Anh Đức (Becamex Binh Duong)
2016	(Vietnam) Nguyễn Tuấn Mạnh (Sanna Khanh Hoa BVN)	(Vietnam) Sầm Ngọc Đức (Hanoi T&T) (Vietnam) Quế Ngọc Hải (Song Lam Nghe An) (Vietnam) Lê Văn Phú (Haiphong) (Vietnam) Trần Văn Vũ (Sanna Khanh Hoa BVN)	(Vietnam) Lê Văn Thắng (Haiphong) (Vietnam) Nghiêm Xuân Tú (Than Quang Ninh) (Vietnam) Đinh Thanh Trung (QNK Quang Nam)	(Senegal) Pape Omar Faye (FLC Thanh Hoa) (Argentina) Gastón Merlo (SHB Da Nang) (Nigeria) Uche Iheruome (Sanna Khanh Hoa BVN)
2017	(Vietnam) Nguyễn Tuấn Mạnh (Sanna Khanh Hoa BVN)	(Vietnam) Đỗ Văn Thuận (Saigon) (Vietnam) Trần Đình Trọng (Saigon) (Vietnam) Hoàng Văn Khánh (Song Lam Nghe An) (Vietnam) Vũ Văn Thanh (Hoang Anh Gia Lai)	(Vietnam) Nguyễn Quang Hải (Hanoi FC) (Vietnam) Nguyễn Hoàng Quốc Chí (Sanna Khanh Hoa BVN) (Vietnam) Nguyễn Huy Hùng (Quang Nam) (Vietnam) Đinh Thanh Trung (Quang Nam)	(Vietnam) Nguyễn Anh Đức (Becamex Binh Duong) (Jamaica) Errol Stevens (Haiphong)
2018	(Vietnam) Đặng Văn Lâm (Haiphong)	(Vietnam) Đoàn Văn Hậu (Hanoi FC) (France) Chaher Zarour (Sanna Khanh Hoa BVN) (Vietnam) Đỗ Duy Mạnh (Hanoi FC) (Vietnam) Vũ Văn Thanh (Hoang Anh Gia Lai)	(Vietnam) Nghiêm Xuân Tú (Than Quang Ninh) (Uganda) Moses Oloya (Hanoi FC) (Vietnam) Ngô Hoàng Thịnh (FLC Thanh Hoa) (Vietnam) Nguyễn Quang Hải (Hanoi FC)	(Vietnam) Nguyễn Công Phượng (Hoang Anh Gia Lai) (Vietnam) Nguyễn Văn Quyết (Hanoi FC)
2019	(Vietnam) Trần Nguyên Mạnh (Song Lam Nghe An)	(Vietnam) Đoàn Văn Hậu (Hanoi FC) (Vietnam) Bùi Tiến Dũng (Viettel) (Vietnam) Nguyễn Hữu Tuấn (Ho Chi Minh City) (Vietnam) Hồ Tấn Tài (Becamex Binh Duong)	(Vietnam) Nguyễn Văn Quyết (Hanoi FC) (Vietnam) Mạc Hồng Quân (Than Quang Ninh) (Vietnam) Nguyễn Quang Hải (Hanoi FC) (Vietnam) Nguyễn Văn Toàn (Hoang Anh Gia Lai)	(Senegal) Pape Omar Faye (Hanoi FC) (Vietnam) Trần Minh Vương (Hoang Anh Gia Lai)
2020	(Vietnam) Trần Nguyên Mạnh (Viettel)	(Vietnam) Sầm Ngọc Đức (Ho Chi Minh City) (Brazil) Janclesio (Hong Linh Ha Tinh) (Vietnam) Hồ Tấn Tài (Becamex Binh Duong)	(Vietnam) Nguyễn Quang Hải (Hanoi FC) (Vietnam) Nguyễn Hai Long (Than Quang Ninh) (Vietnam) Cao Văn Triền (Saigon) (Vietnam) Nguyễn Văn Quyết (Hanoi FC) (Vietnam) Nguyễn Trọng Hoàng (Viettel)	(Vietnam) Nguyễn Công Phượng (Ho Chi Minh City) (Brazil) Pedro Paulo (Saigon)
2022	(Vietnam) Trần Nguyên Mạnh (Viettel)	(Vietnam) Đàm Tiến Dũng (Dong A Thanh Hoa) (Vietnam) Nguyễn Thành Chung (Hanoi FC) (Vietnam) Nguyễn Thanh Bình (Viettel) (Vietnam) Hồ Tấn Tài (Topenland Binh Dinh)	(Vietnam) Nguyễn Hải Huy (Haiphong) (Vietnam) Nguyễn Hoàng Đức (Viettel) (Vietnam) Đỗ Hùng Dũng (Hanoi FC)	(Vietnam) Phạm Tuấn Hải (Hanoi FC) (Jamaica) Rimario Gordon (Haiphong) (Vietnam) Nguyễn Văn Quyết (Hanoi FC)
2023	(Vietnam) Trần Nguyên Mạnh (Thep Xanh Nam Dinh)	(Vietnam) Đoàn Văn Hậu (Cong An Hanoi) (Vietnam) Nguyễn Thanh Bình (Viettel) (Vietnam) Bùi Hoàng Việt Anh (Hanoi FC) (Vietnam) Vũ Văn Thanh (Cong An Hanoi)	(Vietnam) Bùi Văn Đức (Hong Linh Ha Tinh) (Vietnam) Nguyễn Hải Huy (Haiphong) (Vietnam) Nguyễn Hoàng Đức (Viettel) (Vietnam) Lâm Ti Phông (Dong A Thanh Hoa)	(Vietnam) Phạm Tuấn Hải (Hanoi FC) (Brazil) Rafaelson (Topenland Binh Dinh)
2023–24	(Slovakia) Patrik Le Giang (Ho Chi Minh City)	(Vietnam) Nguyễn Văn Đức (Quy Nhon Binh Dinh) (Vietnam) Phan Tuấn Tài (The Cong-Viettel) (Vietnam) Bùi Hoàng Việt Anh (Cong An Hanoi) (Vietnam) Ngô Tùng Quốc (Ho Chi Minh City)	(Vietnam) Nguyễn Văn Quyết (Hanoi FC) (Vietnam) Nguyễn Thái Sơn (Dong A Thanh Hoa) (Vietnam) Nguyễn Hoàng Đức (The Cong-Viettel) (Vietnam) Nguyễn Văn Toàn (Thep Xanh Nam Dinh)	(Vietnam) Phạm Tuấn Hải (Hanoi FC) (Brazil) Rafaelson (Thep Xanh Nam Dinh)
2024–25	(Vietnam) Nguyễn Đình Triệu (Haiphong)	(Vietnam) Cao Pendant Quang Vinh (Cong An Hanoi) (Vietnam) Nguyễn Thành Chung (Hanoi FC) (France) Leygley Adou (Hong Linh Ha Tinh) (Vietnam) Bùi Tiến Dũng (The Cong-Viettel)	(Vietnam) Nguyễn Văn Vĩ (Thep Xanh Nam Dinh) (Vietnam) Nguyễn Quang Hải (Cong An Hanoi) (Brazil) Caio César (Thep Xanh Nam Dinh) (Vietnam) Nguyễn Hai Long (Hanoi FC)	(Vietnam) Nguyễn Tiến Linh (Becamex Binh Duong) (Brazil) Alan Grafite (Cong An Hanoi)
2025–26	(Vietnam) Nguyễn Filip (Cong An Hanoi)	(Vietnam) Cao Pendant Quang Vinh (Cong An Hanoi) (United States) Kyle Colonna (The Cong-Viettel) (Vietnam) Nguyễn Nhật Minh (Haiphong) (Vietnam) Phạm Xuân Mạnh (Hanoi FC)	(Vietnam) Nguyễn Quang Hải (Cong An Hanoi) (Vietnam) Nguyễn Hoàng Đức (Ninh Binh) (Vietnam) Đỗ Hoàng Hên (Hanoi FC)	(Vietnam) Nguyễn Đình Bắc (Cong An Hanoi) (Brazil) Alan Grafite (Cong An Hanoi) (Brazil) Lucão do Break (The Cong-Viettel)

=== V.League 2 ===
Players marked bold won the "Best Player award" in that respective year.

Season	Category			
Season	Goalkeeper	Defenders	Midfielders	Forwards
2023–24	(Vietnam) Phí Minh Long (PVF-CAND)	(Vietnam) Nguyễn Công Nhật (SHB Da Nang) (Vietnam) Lương Duy Cương (SHB Da Nang) (Vietnam) Nguyễn Hữu Thái Bảo (Truong Tuoi Binh Phuoc) (Vietnam) Hà Châu Phi (Truong Tuoi Binh Phuoc)	(Vietnam) Nguyễn Thanh Nhàn (PVF-CAND) (Vietnam) Đặng Anh Tuấn (SHB Da Nang) (Vietnam) Lưu Tự Nhân (Truong Tuoi Binh Phuoc) (Vietnam) Phan Văn Long (SHB Da Nang)	(Vietnam) Hồ Thanh Minh (Hue) (Vietnam) Bùi Văn Bình (Ba Ria-Vung Tau)
2024–25	(Vietnam) Đặng Văn Lâm (Phu Dong Ninh Binh)	(Vietnam) Đỗ Thanh Thịnh (Phu Dong Ninh Binh) (Vietnam) Lê Ngọc Bảo (PVF-CAND) (Vietnam) Huỳnh Tấn Sinh (Truong Tuoi Binh Phuoc) (Vietnam) Nguyễn Hiểu Minh (PVF-CAND)	(Vietnam) Nguyễn Thanh Nhàn (PVF-CAND) (Vietnam) Nguyễn Xuân Bắc (PVF-CAND) (Vietnam) Nguyễn Hoàng Đức (Phu Dong Ninh Binh) (Vietnam) Lưu Tự Nhân (Truong Tuoi Binh Phuoc)	(Vietnam) Nguyễn Công Phượng (Truong Tuoi Binh Phuoc) (Vietnam) Đinh Thanh Bình (Phu Dong Ninh Binh)
2025–26	(Vietnam) Huỳnh Tuấn Linh (Bac Ninh)	(Vietnam) Dương Văn Khoa (Truong Tuoi Dong Nai) (Vietnam) Huỳnh Tấn Sinh (Truong Tuoi Dong Nai) (Vietnam) Nguyễn Văn Đạt (Bac Ninh) (Vietnam) Phan Ngọc Tín (Quy Nhon United)	(Vietnam) Tô Phương Thịnh (Ho Chi Minh City FC) (Vietnam) Lưu Tự Nhân (Truong Tuoi Dong Nai) (Vietnam) Trần Minh Vương (Truong Tuoi Dong Nai) (Vietnam) Phan Văn Hiếu (Bac Ninh)	(Vietnam) Nguyễn Hoàng Anh (PVF-CAND B) (Brazil) Tháileon (Quy Nhon United)

== Top goalscorers by season ==
=== V.League 1 ===
Season	Name	Club	Goals
1980	(Vietnam) Lê Văn Đặng	Cong An Hanoi	10
1981–1982	(Vietnam) Võ Thành Sơn	So Cong Nghiep HCMC	15
1982–1983	(Vietnam) Nguyễn Cao Cường	The Cong	22
1984	(Vietnam) Nguyễn Văn Dũng	Nam Dinh	15
1985	(Vietnam) Nguyễn Văn Dũng	Nam Dinh	15
1986	(Vietnam) Nguyễn Văn Dũng (Vietnam) Nguyễn Minh Huy	Nam Định; Hai Quan	12
1987–1988	(Vietnam) Lưu Tấn Liêm	Hai Quan	15
1989	(Vietnam) Hà Vương Ngầu Nại	Saigon Port	10
1990	(Vietnam) Nguyễn Hồng Sơn	The Cong	10
1991	(Vietnam) Hà Vương Ngầu Nại	Saigon Port	10
1992	(Vietnam) Trần Minh Toàn	Quang Nam-Da Nang	6
1993–1994	(Vietnam) Nguyễn Công Long (Vietnam) Bùi Sỹ Thành	Binh Dinh; Long An	12
1995	(Vietnam) Trần Minh Chiến	Cong An Ho Chi Minh City	14
1996	(Vietnam) Lê Huỳnh Đức	Cong An Ho Chi Minh City	25
1997	(Vietnam) Lê Huỳnh Đức	Cong An Ho Chi Minh City	16
1998	(Vietnam) Nguyễn Văn Dũng	Nam Dinh	17
1999–2000	(Vietnam) Văn Sỹ Thủy	Song Lam Nghe An	14
2000–2001	(Vietnam) Đặng Đạo	Khanh Hoa	11
2001–2002	(Vietnam) Hồ Văn Lợi	Saigon Port	9
2003	(Nigeria) Emeka Achilefu	Nam Dinh	11
2004	(Nigeria) Amaobi Uzowuru	Nam Dinh	15
2005	(Brazil) Kesley Alves	Becamex Binh Duong	21
2006	(Brazil) Elenildo de Jesus	Thap Mien Nam Saigon Port	18
2007	(Brazil) Jose Almeida	SHB Da Nang	16
2008	(Brazil) Jose Almeida	SHB Da Nang	23
2009	(Argentina) Gastón Merlo (Brazil) Lázaro	SHB Da Nang; Quan Khu 4	15
2010	(Argentina) Gastón Merlo	SHB Da Nang	19
2011	(Argentina) Gastón Merlo	SHB Da Nang	22
2012	(Nigeria) Timothy Anjembe	Hanoi ACB	17
2013	(Argentina) Gonzalo Marronkle (Nigeria) Samson Olaleye	Hanoi T&T	14
2014	(Vietnam) Hoàng Vũ Samson	Hanoi T&T	23
2015	(Democratic Republic of the Congo) Patiyo Tambwe	QNK Quang Nam	18
2016	(Argentina) Gastón Merlo	SHB Da Nang	24
2017	(Vietnam) Nguyễn Anh Đức	Becamex Binh Duong	17
2018	(Nigeria) Oseni Ganiyu	Hanoi FC	17
2019	(Senegal) Pape Omar Faye (Brazil) Bruno Cantanhede	Hanoi FC; Viettel	15
2020	(Jamaica) Rimario Gordon (Brazil) Pedro Paulo	Hanoi FC; Saigon	12
2022	(Jamaica) Rimario Gordon	Haiphong	17
2023	(Brazil) Rafaelson	Topenland Binh Dinh	16
2023–24	(Brazil) Rafaelson	Thep Xanh Nam Dinh	31
2024–25	(Brazil) Lucão do Break (Brazil) Alan Grafite	Haiphong; Cong An Hanoi	14
2025–26	(Brazil) Alan Grafite	Cong An Hanoi	18

=== V.League 2 ===
Season	Name	Club	Goals
2005	(Ghana) Felix Aboagye	Khatoco Khanh Hoa	14
2006	(Vietnam) Đặng Phương Nam	The Cong	14
2007	(Vietnam) Trịnh Quang Vinh	The Cong	13
2008	(Brazil) Flávio Cruz	Huda Hue	18
2009	(Brazil) Eduardo Furrier	Than Quang Ninh	16
2010	(Vietnam) Nguyễn Xuân Thành (Brazil) Jorge Cruz (Cameroon) Christian Nsi Amougou (Vietnam) Nguyễn Thành Trung	Hanoi ACB; Boss Binh Dinh; Than Quang Ninh; An Giang	13
2011	(Cameroon) Christian Nsi Amougou	Xuan Thanh Saigon Cement	17
2012	(Mali) Souleymane Diabate	XSKT Can Tho	21
2013	(Nigeria) Uche Iheruome (Vietnam) Đinh Thanh Trung	Hùng Vuong An Giang; QNK Quang Nam	10
2014	(Vietnam) Huỳnh Văn Thanh	Sanna Khanh Hoa BVN	10
2015	(Vietnam) Trịnh Duy Long	Hanoi FC	9
2016	(Vietnam) Hồ Sỹ Giáp (Vietnam) Nguyễn Tuấn Anh	Binh Phuoc; Ho Chi Minh City	12
2017	(Vietnam) Võ Văn Minh (Vietnam) Phạm Văn Thuận (Vietnam) Nguyễn Hồng Quân (Vietnam) Bùi Duy Thường	Hue; Nam Dinh; Dak Lak; Viettel	5
2018	(Vietnam) Y Thăng Êban	Dak Lak	15
2019	(Vietnam) Nguyễn Xuân Nam	Pho Hien	14
2020	(Vietnam) Nguyễn Công Thành	Dong Thap	12
2022	(Vietnam) Nguyễn Thanh Nhàn	Pho Hien	10
2023	(Vietnam) Nguyễn Thanh Nhàn (Vietnam) Lê Văn Nam	PVF-CAND; Quang Nam	10
2023–24	(Vietnam) Bùi Văn Bình	Ba Ria-Vũng Tau	11
2024–25	(Vietnam) Lưu Tự Nhân	Trường Tươi Bình Phước	9
2025–26	(Brazil) Tháileon	Quy Nhơn United	14

== Best Young Player ==
=== V.League 1 ===
Season	Player	Team	Age
1999–2000	(Vietnam) Phạm Hùng Dũng	Da Nang	21
2000–01	(Vietnam) Thạch Bảo Khanh	The Cong	22
2004	(Vietnam) Phan Văn Tài Em	Gach Dong Tam Long An	22
2005	(Vietnam) Hoàng Ngọc Linh	Song Da Nam Dinh	20
2013	(Vietnam) Trần Minh Vương	Hoang Anh Gia Lai	18
2014	(Vietnam) Trần Minh Vương (2)	Hoang Anh Gia Lai	19
2015	(Vietnam) Đỗ Duy Mạnh	Hanoi T&T	20
2016	(Vietnam) Vũ Văn Thanh	Hoang Anh Gia Lai	20
2017	(Vietnam) Nguyễn Quang Hải	Hanoi FC	20
2018	(Vietnam) Nguyễn Quang Hải (2)	Hanoi FC	21
2019	(Vietnam) Đoàn Văn Hậu	Hanoi FC	20
2020	(Vietnam) Bùi Hoàng Việt Anh	Hanoi FC	21
2022	(Vietnam) Nguyễn Phi Hoàng	SHB Da Nang	19
2023	(Vietnam) Nguyễn Thái Sơn	Dong A Thanh Hoa	20
2023–24	(Vietnam) Bùi Vĩ Hào	Becamex Binh Duong	21
2024–25	(Vietnam) Lê Văn Thuận	Dong A Thanh Hoa	18
2025–26	(Vietnam) Nguyễn Đình Bắc	Cong An Hanoi	22

=== V.League 2 ===
Season	Player	Team	Age
2023–24	(Vietnam) Nguyễn Thành Đạt	Truong Tuoi Binh Phuoc	20
2024–25	(Vietnam) Nguyễn Hiểu Minh	PVF-CAND	21
2025–26	(Vietnam) Nguyễn Hoàng Anh	PVF-CAND B	20

== Best manager ==
=== V.League 1 ===
Season	Winner	Club
1999–2000	(Vietnam) Nguyễn Thành Vinh	Song Lam Nghe An
2000–01	(Vietnam) Ninh Văn Bảo	Nam Dinh
2004	(Vietnam) Nguyễn Ngọc Hảo	Song Da Nam Dinh
2005	(Vietnam) Huỳnh Ngọc San	Gach Dong Tam Long An
2006	(Portugal) Henrique Calisto	Gach Dong Tam Long An
2007	(Vietnam) Lê Thụy Hải	Becamex Binh Duong
2008	(Vietnam) Lê Thụy Hải (2)	Becamex Binh Duong
2009	(Vietnam) Lê Huỳnh Đức	SHB Da Nang
2010	(Vietnam) Phan Thanh Hùng	Hanoi T&T
2011	(Vietnam) Nguyễn Hữu Thắng	Song Lam Nghe An
2012	(Vietnam) Lê Huỳnh Đức (2)	SHB Da Nang
2013	(Vietnam) Phan Thanh Hùng (2)	Hanoi T&T
2014	(Vietnam) Nguyễn Thanh Sơn	Becamex Binh Duong
2015	(Vietnam) Phan Thanh Hùng (3)	Hanoi T&T
2016	(Vietnam) Chu Đình Nghiêm	Hanoi T&T
2017	(Vietnam) Hoàng Văn Phúc	Quang Nam
2018	(Vietnam) Chu Đình Nghiêm (2)	Hanoi FC
2019	(South Korea) Jung Hae-seong	Ho Chi Minh City
2020	(Vietnam) Trương Việt Hoàng	Viettel
2022	(Vietnam) Chu Đình Nghiêm (3)	Haiphong
2023	(Montenegro) Božidar Bandović	Hanoi FC
2023–24	(Vietnam) Vũ Hồng Việt	Thep Xanh Nam Dinh
2024–25	(Vietnam) Vũ Hồng Việt (2)	Thep Xanh Nam Dinh
2025–26	(Brazil) Alexandré Pölking	Cong An Hanoi

=== V.League 2 ===
Season	Winner	Club
2023–24	(Vietnam) Trương Việt Hoàng	SHB Da Nang
2024–25	(Vietnam) Nguyễn Việt Thắng	Phu Dong Ninh Binh
2025–26	(Vietnam) Nguyễn Việt Thắng (2)	Truong Tuoi Dong Nai

== Best Referee ==
Season	Winner
2006	(Vietnam) Dương Mạnh Hùng
2007	(Vietnam) Dương Văn Hiền
2008	(Vietnam) Dương Văn Hiền (2)
2009	(Vietnam) Dương Văn Hiền (3)
2010	(Vietnam) Võ Minh Trí
2011	(Vietnam) Võ Quang Vinh
2012	(Vietnam) Võ Quang Vinh (2)
2013	(Vietnam) Nguyễn Trọng Thư
2014	(Vietnam) Nguyễn Trọng Thư (2)
2015	(Vietnam) Võ Minh Trí (2)
2016	(Vietnam) Nguyễn Ngọc Châu
2017	(Vietnam) Võ Minh Trí (3)
2018	(Vietnam) Ngô Duy Lân
2019	(Vietnam) Hoàng Ngọc Hà
2020	(Vietnam) Hoàng Ngọc Hà (2)
2022	(Vietnam) Nguyễn Đình Thái
2023	(Vietnam) Ngô Duy Lân (2)
2023–24	(Vietnam) Hoàng Ngọc Hà (3)
2024–25	(Vietnam) Hoàng Ngọc Hà (4)
2025–26	Not awarded

== See also ==
- Vietnamese Golden Ball
