= 2016 V.League 1 =

Toyota V.League 1 – 2016
- Season: 2016
- Dates: 20 February – 18 September
- Champions: Hanoi T&T; 3rd VL1 title 3rd Vietnamese title
- Runner up: Haiphong FC
- Relegated: Dong Thap FC
- Matches: 182
- Goals: 548 (3.01 per match)
- Top goalscorer: Gastón Merlo (24 goals)
- Biggest home win: Haiphong FC 5–0 Long An FC; Becamex Binh Duong 5–0 Hoang Anh Gia Lai
- Biggest away win: Dong Thap FC 0–4 SHB Danang
- Highest scoring: Becamex Binh Duong 4–5 Hanoi T&T
- Longest winning run: Haiphong FC (7 matches)
- Longest unbeaten run: Haiphong FC; Than Quang Ninh (8 matches)
- Longest winless run: Dong Thap FC (23 matches)
- Longest losing run: Dong Thap FC (9 matches)
- Highest attendance: 19,000
- Lowest attendance: 1,000
- Total attendance: 1,147,900
- Average attendance: 6,307
- All statistics correct as of 23 September 2016.

The 2016 V.League 1 (known as the Toyota V.League 1 for sponsorship reasons) season was the 33rd season of the V.League 1, the highest division of Vietnamese football and the 16th as a professional league. It began on 20 February 2016 and ended 18 September 2016.

== Changes from last season ==
=== Team changes ===
The following teams had changed division since the 2015 season.

==== To V.League 1 ====
Promoted from V.League 2

- Saigon FC

==== From V.League 1 ====
Relegated to 2016 V.League 2

- Dong Nai FC

=== Rule changes ===
In season 2016, the club finishing in the 14th position would be relegated to V-League 2. The club that had finished in the 13th position would face the winner of a play-off between the V-League 2's second, third and fourth place clubs for a place in the 2017 V.League 1 season.

=== Name changes ===
- Dong Tam Long An changed their name to Long An FC in December 2015.
- In April 2016 with only four matches remaining, promoted side Hanoi FC relocated to Ho Chi Minh City and renamed Saigon FC. This was with only four matchdays played

== Teams ==
Locations of the 2016 V.League 1 teams

Team	Based	Home stadium	Capacity	Previous season rank
Becamex Binh Duong	Binh Duong	Go Dau	18,250	VL1 (1st)
XSKT Cantho	Cantho	Cantho	60,000	VL1 (11th)
SHB Danang	Danang	Chi Lang	28,000	VL1 (9th)
Dong Thap FC	Dong Thap	Cao Lanh	23,000	VL1 (12th)
Hoang Anh Gia Lai	Gia Lai	Pleiku	12,000	VL1 (13th)
Haiphong FC	Haiphong	Lach Tray	28,000	VL1 (6th)
Hanoi T&T	Hanoi	Hàng Đẫy Stadium	22,000	VL1 (2nd)
Sanna Khanh Hoa BVN	Khanh Hoa	19 August	25,000	VL1 (5th)
Long An FC	Long An	Long An	19,975	VL1 (10th)
Song Lam Nghe An	Nghe An	Vinh	12,000	VL1 (7th)
QNK Quang Nam	Quang Nam	Tam Ky	15,624	VL1 (8th)
Than Quang Ninh	Quang Ninh	Cam Pha	15,000	VL1 (4th)
Saigon FC	Ho Chi Minh City	Thong Nhat	22,000	VL2 (1st)
FLC Thanh Hoa	Thanh Hoa	Thanh Hoa	14,000	VL1 (3rd)

=== Personnel and kits ===
Note: Flags indicate national team as has been defined under FIFA eligibility rules. Players may hold more than one non-FIFA nationality.

Team	Head coach	Captain	Kit manufacturer
Becamex Binh Duong	(Vietnam) Nguyễn Thanh Sơn	(Vietnam) Nguyễn Anh Đức	(Italy) Kappa
XSKT Cantho	(Vietnam) Vũ Quang Bảo	(Vietnam) Trần Chí Công	(Vietnam) KeepDri
SHB Danang	(Vietnam) Lê Huỳnh Đức	(Vietnam) Nguyễn Vũ Phong	Made by club
Dong Thap FC	(Vietnam) Phạm Công Lộc	(Vietnam) Trần Minh Lợi	(Vietnam) Codad
Hoang Anh Gia Lai	(Vietnam) Nguyễn Quốc Tuấn	(Vietnam) Bùi Văn Long	Made by club
Haiphong FC	(Vietnam) Trương Việt Hoàng	(Vietnam) Lê Văn Phú	(England) Mitre
Hanoi T&T	(Vietnam) Chu Đình Nghiêm	(Argentina) Gonzalo Marronkle	(Italy) Kappa
Saigon FC	(Vietnam) Nguyễn Đức Thắng	(Vietnam) Nguyễn Ngọc Duy	Made by club
Sanna Khanh Hoa BVN	(Vietnam) Vo Dinh Tan	(Vietnam) Trần Vǎn Vǔ	Made by club
Long An FC	(Vietnam) Ngô Quang Sang	(Vietnam) Huỳnh Quang Thanh	(Italy) Kappa
Song Lam Nghe An	(Vietnam) Ngô Quang Trường	(Vietnam) Trần Nguyên Mạnh	Made by club
QNK Quang Nam	(Vietnam) Hoàng Văn Phúc	(Vietnam) Đinh Thanh Trung	Made by club
Than Quang Ninh	(Vietnam) Phan Thanh Hùng	(Vietnam) Huỳnh Tuấn Linh	(Spain) Joma
FLC Thanh Hoa	(Vietnam) Hoàng Thanh Tùng	(Senegal) Pape Omar Faye	(England) Mitre

=== Managerial changes ===
Team	Outgoing manager	Manner of departure	Date of vacancy	Position in table	Incoming manager	Date of appointment
FLC Thanh Hoa	(Vietnam) Hoàng Thanh Tùng	Demoted	20 January 2016	Pre-Season	(Vietnam) Lê Thụy Hải	20 January 2016
Hanoi T&T	(Vietnam) Phan Thanh Hùng	Resigned	13 February 2016	Pre-Season	(Vietnam) Phạm Minh Đức	13 February 2016
Than Quang Ninh	(Vietnam) Phạm Như Thuần	Resigned	16 March 2016	9th	(Vietnam) Phan Thanh Hùng	16 March 2016
Hanoi T&T	(Vietnam) Phạm Minh Đức	Demoted	17 March 2016	14th	(Vietnam) Chu Đình Nghiêm	17 March 2016

=== Foreign players ===
V.League teams are allowed to use two foreign players and one naturalised player

Club	Player 1	Player 2	Player 3	Naturalised Vietnamese Player	Former Players^{1}
Becamex Binh Duong	(Cameroon) Nsi Amougou	(Slovenia) Ivan Firer		(Kenya) → (Vietnam) Nguyễn Rodgers	(South Korea) Han Seung-yeop (Uganda) Moses Oloya (Uganda) Henry Kisekka
FLC Thanh Hoa	(Senegal) Pape Omar Faye	(Nigeria) Sunday Emmanuel		(Netherlands) → (Vietnam) Nguyễn van Bakel	(Slovenia) Ivan Firer
Hanoi T&T	(Argentina) Víctor Ormazábal	(Argentina) Gonzalo Marronkle	(France) Loris Arnaud	(Nigeria) → (Vietnam) Hoàng Vũ Samson	
Haiphong FC	(Jamaica) Diego Fagan	(Jamaica) Errol Stevens		(Ghana) → (Vietnam) Lê Văn Phú	
Hoang Anh Gia Lai	(Japan) Masaaki Ideguchi	(Brazil) Júnior Paraíba			(Brazil) Osmar Francisco
Long An FC	(Croatia) Marko Šimić	(Uganda) Henry Kisekka		(Ghana) → (Vietnam) Lê Văn Tân	(Nigeria) Akanni-Sunday Wasiu (Central African Republic) Franklin Clovis Anzité
QNK Quang Nam	(Brazil) Claudecir	(Senegal) Sadio Diao		(Nigeria) → (Vietnam) Hoàng Vissai	(Nigeria) Felix Ogbuke (Nigeria) Suleiman Oladoja
Saigon FC	(Uganda) Andrew Mwesigwa	(Brazil) Dudu Lima			(Haiti) Jean-Eudes Maurice
Sanna Khanh Hoa BVN	(France) Chaher Zarour	(Nigeria) Uche Iheruome			
Song Lam Nghe An	(Nigeria) Odah Onoriode Marshal	(Ivory Coast) Baba Salia			
SHB Danang	(Argentina) Gastón Merlo	(Brazil) Eydison			(Jamaica) Horace James
Than Quang Ninh	(Russia) Rod Dyachenko	(Uganda) Geoffrey Kizito			(Nigeria) George Bisan
XSKT Cantho	(Democratic Republic of the Congo) Tambwe Patiyo	(Nigeria) Oseni Ganiyu		(Nigeria) → (Vietnam) Đinh Hoàng Max	
Dong Thap FC	(Nigeria) Samson Kpenosen	(Brazil) Diego		(Brazil) → (Vietnam) Nguyễn Trung Sơn	(Croatia) Marko Šimić

== League table ==
Pos	Team	Pld	W	D	L	GF	GA	GD	Pts	Qualification or relegation
1	Hanoi T&T (C, Q)	26	16	2	8	45	28	+17	50	Qualification to AFC Champions League preliminary round 2
2	Haiphong FC	26	15	5	6	47	32	+15	50	
3	SHB Danang	26	15	4	7	49	33	+16	49	
4	Than Quang Ninh (Q)	26	13	5	8	39	32	+7	44	Qualification to AFC Cup group stage (Note: Than Quang Ninh qualified for the 2017 AFC Cup by winning the 2016 Vietnamese Cup.)
5	QNK Quang Nam	26	11	9	6	44	32	+12	42	
6	FLC Thanh Hoa	26	12	6	8	51	42	+9	42	
7	Saigon FC	26	9	9	8	34	32	+2	36 (Note: Saigon ahead of Sanna Khanh Hoa by head-to-head record: KH 0-2 SG; SG 1-1 KH)	
8	Sanna Khanh Hoa BVN (Q)	26	10	6	10	34	30	+4	36	Qualification to Mekong Club Championship
9	Song Lam Nghe An	26	9	7	10	34	36	−2	34 (Note: Song Lam Nghe An ahead of Becamex Binh Duong and XSKT Cantho by head-to-head record: SLNA 9pts; BD 4pts 4/3; CT 4pts 4/6)	
10	Becamex Binh Duong	26	9	7	10	39	37	+2	34	
11	XSKT Cantho	26	10	4	12	37	36	+1	34	
12	Hoang Anh Gia Lai	26	9	3	14	39	50	−11	30	
13	Long An FC (O)	26	5	4	17	34	62	−28	19	Relegation Play-off
14	Dong Thap FC (R)	26	1	5	20	22	67	−45	8	Relegation to V.League 2

Updated to match(es) played on 18 September 2016. Source: vnleague.com
Rules for classification: 1) Points; 2) Head-to-head points; 3) Head-to-head goal difference; 4) Head-to-head goals scored; 5) Reserve league points; 6) Goal difference; 7) Goals scored; 8) Disciplinary points (1 point for each yellow card, 3 points for each red card)
(C) Champions; (O) Play-off winners; (Q) Qualified for the phase indicated; (R) Relegated

== Results ==
Home \ Away	BBD	FTH	HNT	HPG	HAGL	LFC	QNK	SGN	SKH	SLNA	SDN	TQN	XCT	DTP
Becamex Binh Duong		0–3	4–5	1–3	5–0	3–2	1–3	1–1	3–1	1–2	0–1	1–0	2–0	3–0
FLC Thanh Hoa	2–2		3–0	0–1	2–1	2–1	4–4	2–2	2–1	2–2	3–1	2–2	3–2	4–0
Hanoi T&T	1–2	2–0		2–1	3–0	1–1	3–0	1–1	1–0	1–0	2–1	0–1	0–1	2–0
Haiphong FC	0–0	1–1	2–1		4–2	5–0	2–1	1–1	2–0	3–0	0–3	2–1	1–0	3–2
Hoang Anh Gia Lai	3–1	3–1	1–0	1–1		3–2	1–4	1–3	2–1	0–0	1–2	0–0	2–1	5–2
Long An FC	1–1	0–1	2–5	2–5	1–3		1–0	1–0	2–1	1–2	1–3	1–2	3–3	2–1
QNK Quang Nam	2–1	2–0	0–1	0–1	2–0	6–2		3–3	1–1	2–0	1–1	1–1	0–0	2–0
Saigon FC	0–2	3–1	0–3	3–3	0–5	3–1	0–0		1–1	1–0	3–0	0–0	0–1	4–0
Sanna Khanh Hoa BVN	1–1	0–2	1–0	3–0	4–1	2–0	0–1	0–2		2–2	3–1	3–1	2–0	1–1
Song Lam Nghe An	2–0	1–0	1–3	0–2	1–0	1–1	3–3	1–0	1–2		0–2	4–0	4–2	3–0
SHB Danang	1–1	2–1	1–2	2–0	3–1	4–1	3–4	3–1	1–0	1–1		1–0	2–2	2–1
Than Quang Ninh	2–1	2–4	0–1	3–1	3–1	2–1	2–0	1–0	1–2	3–1	3–2		2–1	4–0
XSKT Cantho	0–0	5–2	3–0	3–2	2–1	2–1	0–1	0–1	0–1	2–0	1–2	0–2		4–1
Dong Thap FC	1–2	2–4	2–5	0–1	2–1	1–3	1–1	0–1	1–1	2–2	0–4	1–1	1–2	

Legend: Blue = home team win; Yellow = draw; Red = away team win.

=== Play-off match ===
The team finishing 13th faced the winner of 2016 V.League 2 play-off II match.

Long An FC won the match and would remain in the 2017 V.League 1.

23 September 2016
17:00

Long An FC	1–0 (a.e.t.)	Viettel
Huỳnh Tấn Tài 95'	Report

Chi Lăng Stadium, Danang
Attendance: 2,000
Referee: Mongkolchai Pechsri (Thailand)

== Positions by round ==
Team ╲ Round	1	2	3	4	5	6	7	8	9	10	11	12	13	14	15	16	17	18	19	20	21	22	23	24	25	26
Becamex Binh Duong	3	5	5	8	6	4	5	6	3	3	2	5	7	8	9	8	9	9	9	11	10	7	7	7	8	10
FLC Thanh Hoa	2	2	1	1	2	2	2	2	2	2	3	2	2	3	3	2	3	3	4	6	5	5	5	5	5	6
Hanoi T&T	13	13	13	14	14	13	11	9	7	9	7	6	5	4	4	4	4	4	2	2	4	4	2	1	1	1
Haiphong FC	4	1	2	2	1	1	1	1	1	1	1	1	1	1	1	1	1	2	1	1	1	1	3	3	2	2
Hoang Anh Gia Lai	1	4	4	7	10	9	9	11	12	11	12	12	12	12	12	12	12	12	12	12	12	12	12	12	12	12
Long An FC	7	10	8	12	12	12	13	13	13	13	13	13	13	13	13	13	13	13	13	13	13	13	13	13	13	13
QNK Quang Nam	10	6	6	9	7	7	8	7	8	8	11	8	6	7	8	9	7	6	6	5	6	6	6	6	6	5
Saigon FC	14	10	9	4	9	8	6	3	4	4	4	7	8	9	7	7	6	7	7	7	7	8	10	11	11	7
Sanna Khanh Hoa BVN	6	9	11	6	5	6	7	10	9	10	8	9	10	10	10	10	10	10	11	8	8	9	8	8	9	8
Song Lam Nghe An	11	14	12	11	8	11	10	12	11	12	10	11	11	11	11	11	11	11	10	9	11	11	11	10	7	9
SHB Danang	5	3	3	3	3	3	3	4	5	6	5	3	3	2	2	3	2	1	3	3	2	2	4	4	3	3
Than Quang Ninh	9	7	7	10	11	10	12	8	6	7	6	4	4	5	5	5	5	5	5	4	3	3	1	2	4	4
XSKT Cantho	12	8	10	5	4	5	4	5	10	5	9	10	9	6	6	6	8	8	8	10	9	10	9	9	10	11
Dong Thap FC	8	12	14	13	13	14	14	14	14	14	14	14	14	14	14	14	14	14	14	14	14	14	14	14	14	14

Winner; Champions League
Relegated to V.League 2

Updated to match(es) played on 18 September 2016. Source: Table by round (in Vietnamese)

== Season statistics ==
As of 20 September 2016

=== Top scorers ===
Rank	Player	Club	Goals
1	(Argentina) Gastón Merlo	SHB Danang	24
2	(Vietnam) Hoàng Vũ Samson	Hanoi T&T	15
3	(Nigeria) Uche Iheruome	Sanna Khanh Hoa BVN	14
4	(Senegal) Pape Omar Faye	FLC Thanh Hoa	13
5	(Russia) Rod Dyachenko	Than Quang Ninh	12
6	(Brazil) Claudecir	QNK Quang Nam	11
6	(Vietnam) Lê Văn Thắng	Haiphong FC	11
6	(Argentina) Gonzalo Marronkle	Hanoi T&T	11
6	(Vietnam) Vũ Minh Tuấn	Than Quang Ninh	11
10	(Nigeria) Oseni Ganiyu Bolaji	XSKT Cantho	10
10	(Nigeria) Odah Marshal	Song Lam Nghe An	10
10	(Vietnam) Nguyễn Anh Đức	Becamex Binh Duong	10
10	(Vietnam) Nguyễn Đình Bảo	Haiphong FC	10
10	(Jamaica) Errol Stevens	Haiphong FC	10
10	(Democratic Republic of the Congo) Patiyo Tambwe	XSKT Cantho	10

=== Own goals ===
Player	Club	Against	Round
(Vietnam) Nguyễn Trung Sơn	Dong Thap FC	Hanoi T&T	2
(Vietnam) Hồ Trường Khang	Dong Thap FC	Hoang Anh Gia Lai	4
(Vietnam) Nguyễn Tiến Duy	Than Quang Ninh	SHB Danang	5
(Vietnam) Diệp Hoài Xuân	Dong Thap FC	XSKT Cantho	5
(Central African Republic) Franklin Clovis Anzité	Long An	SHB Danang	11

=== Hattrick ===
Player	For	Against	Result	Date
(Jamaica) Errol Stevens	Haiphong FC	Hoang Anh Gia Lai	4–2	10 April 2016
(Vietnam) Hoàng Vũ Samson	Hanoi T&T	Dong Thap FC	5–2	24 April 2016
(Brazil) Claudecir	QNK Quang Nam	FLC Thanh Hoa	4–4	10 July 2016
(Vietnam) Trần Minh Vương	Hoang Anh Gia Lai	Becamex Binh Duong	3–1	13 August 2016
(Vietnam) Nguyễn Anh Đức	Becamex Binh Duong	Dong Thap FC	3–0	17 August 2016
(Vietnam) Nguyễn Đình Bảo	Haiphong FC	Long An	5–2	11 September 2016
(Argentina) Gastón Merlo	SHB Danang	Dong Thap FC	4–0	18 September 2016
(Brazil) Claudecir	QNK Quang Nam	Long An	6–2	18 September 2016

== Awards ==
=== Monthly awards ===
Month	Club of the Month	Coach of the Month		Player of the Month	
Month	Club of the Month	Coach	Club	Player	Club
February; March	Haiphong FC	(Vietnam) Trương Việt Hoàng	Haiphong FC	(Argentina) Gastón Merlo	SHB Danang
April	Haiphong FC	(Vietnam) Trương Việt Hoàng	Haiphong FC	(Vietnam) Hoàng Vũ Samson	Hanoi T&T
May; June	Than Quang Ninh	(Vietnam) Chu Đình Nghiêm	Hanoi T&T	(Vietnam) Hoàng Vũ Samson	Hanoi T&T
July	SHB Danang	(Vietnam) Lê Huỳnh Đức	SHB Danang	(Vietnam) Hoàng Vũ Samson	Hanoi T&T
August	Hoang Anh Gia Lai	(Vietnam) Nguyễn Quốc Tuấn	Hoang Anh Gia Lai	(Argentina) Gastón Merlo	SHB Danang
September	Hanoi T&T	(Vietnam) Chu Đình Nghiêm	Hanoi T&T	(Argentina) Gastón Merlo	SHB Danang

=== Annual awards ===
==== Manager of the Season ====
(Vietnam) Chu Đình Nghiêm (Hanoi T&T)

==== Best player of the Season ====
(Argentina) Gastón Merlo (SHB Danang)

==== Best young player of the Season ====
(Vietnam) Vũ Văn Thanh (Hoang Anh Gia Lai)

==== Dream Team ====
Goalkeepers	Defenders	Midfielders	Forwards
(Vietnam) Huỳnh Tuấn Linh (Than Quang Ninh)	(Vietnam) Sầm Ngọc Đức (Hanoi T&T) (Vietnam) Quế Ngọc Hải (Song Lam Nghe An) (Vietnam) Lê Văn Phú (Haiphong FC) (Vietnam) Trần Văn Vũ (Sanna Khanh Hoa BVN)	(Vietnam) Lê Văn Thắng (Haiphong FC) (Senegal) Pape Omar Faye (FLC Thanh Hoa) (Vietnam) Nghiêm Xuân Tú (Than Quang Ninh) (Vietnam) Đinh Thanh Trung (QNK Quang Nam)	(Argentina) Gastón Merlo (SHB Danang) (Nigeria) Uche Iheruome (Sanna Khanh Hoa BVN)

== See also ==
- 2016 V.League 2
- 2016 Vietnamese National Football Second League
- 2016 Vietnamese National Football Third League
