= 2017 V.League 1 =

Toyota V.League 1 – 2017
- Season: 2017
- Dates: 7 January – 25 November
- Champions: Quang Nam FC; 1st VL1 title 1st Vietnamese title
- Relegated: Long An FC
- Matches: 182
- Goals: 529 (2.91 per match)
- Top goalscorer: Nguyen Anh Duc (17 goals)
- Biggest home win: Saigon FC 4–0 Long An FC; Hanoi FC 4–0 Long An FC; Hanoi FC 4–0 XSKT Cantho; Hanoi FC 4–0 Ho Chi Minh City FC; Becamex Binh Duong 4–0 Long An FC
- Biggest away win: XSKT Cantho 1–5 Becamex Binh Duong; Long An FC 1–5 Hanoi FC
- Highest scoring: FLC Thanh Hoa 5–3 Hoang Anh Gia Lai; Than Quang Ninh 4–4 Hanoi FC (8 goals)
- Longest winning run: FLC Thanh Hoa; Hoang Anh Gia Lai; Than Quang Ninh; Ho Chi Minh City FC; Sanna Khanh Hoa BVN; Quang Nam FC (3 matches)
- Longest unbeaten run: Hanoi FC (13 matches)
- Longest winless run: Long An FC (16 matches)
- Longest losing run: Long An FC (10 matches)
- Highest attendance: 19,000; SHB Danang 1–0 Hoang Anh Gia Lai
- Lowest attendance: 0 Haiphong 2–0 Quang Nam FC
- Total attendance: 1,017,700
- Average attendance: 5,592
- All statistics correct as of complete.

The 2017 V.League 1 (known as the Toyota V.League 1 for sponsorship reasons) season was the 34th season of the V.League 1, the highest division of Vietnamese football and the 17th as a professional league. The season began on 7 January 2017 and ended on 25 November 2017. The season was twice interrupted due to the Vietnam Football Federation's decision to stop the league for 4 weeks due to the 2017 FIFA U-20 World Cup, and then again for 7 weeks for the 29th SEA Games.

== Changes from the previous season ==
=== Team changes ===
The following teams have changed division since the 2016 season.

==== To V.League 1 ====
Promoted from V.League 2

- Ho Chi Minh City FC

==== From V.League 1 ====
Relegated to V.League 2

- Dong Thap FC

=== Rule changes ===
There is no longer a play-off match this season, so there is only one direct relegation spot.

=== Names changes ===
In January 2017, Hanoi T&T were renamed Hanoi FC and QNK Quang Nam were renamed Quang Nam FC.

=== Stadium changes ===
SHB Danang moved into Hoa Xuan Stadium from Chi Lang Stadium.

== Teams ==
Locations of the 2017 V.League 1 teams

Team	Location	Stadium	Capacity	Previous season rank
Becamex Binh Duong	Binh Duong	Go Dau	13,035	VL1 (10th)
XSKT Cantho	Cantho	Cantho	60,000	VL1 (11th)
SHB Danang	Danang	Hoa Xuan	20,000	VL1 (3rd)
Hoang Anh Gia Lai	Gia Lai	Pleiku	12,000	VL1 (12th)
Haiphong FC	Haiphong	Lach Tray	25,000	VL1 (2nd)
Hanoi FC	Hanoi	Hang Day	22,500	VL1 (1st)
Ho Chi Minh City FC	Ho Chi Minh City	Thong Nhat	16,000	VL2 (1st)
Saigon FC	Ho Chi Minh City	Thong Nhat	16,000	VL1 (7th)
Sanna Khanh Hoa BVN	Khanh Hoa	19 August	25,000	VL1 (8th)
Long An FC	Long An	Long An	19,975	VL1 (13th)
Song Lam Nghe An	Nghe An	Vinh	18,000	VL1 (9th)
Quang Nam FC	Quang Nam	Tam Ky	15,000	VL1 (5th)
Than Quang Ninh	Quang Ninh	Cam Pha	20,000	VL1 (4th)
FLC Thanh Hoa	Thanh Hoa	Thanh Hoa	12,000	VL1 (6th)

=== Personnel and kits ===
Note: Flags indicate national team as has been defined under FIFA eligibility rules. Players may hold more than one non-FIFA nationality.

Team	Head coach	Captain	Kit manufacturer
Becamex Binh Duong	(Vietnam) Tran Binh Su	(Vietnam) Nguyen Anh Duc	(Italy) Kappa
XSKT Cantho	(Vietnam) Vu Quang Bao	(Vietnam) Tran Chi Cong	(Vietnam) KeepDri
SHB Danang	(Vietnam) Le Huynh Duc	(Vietnam) Nguyen Vu Phong	Made by club
Hoang Anh Gia Lai	(Vietnam) Duong Minh Ninh	(Vietnam) Nguyen Cong Phuong	Made by club
Haiphong FC	(Vietnam) Truong Viet Hoang	(Vietnam) Le Van Phu	(England) Mitre
Hanoi FC	(Vietnam) Chu Dinh Nghien	(Argentina) Gonzalo Marronkle	(Italy) Kappa
Ho Chi Minh City	(Vietnam) Lu Dinh Tuan	(Vietnam) Truong Dinh Luat	(Japan) Mizuno
Saigon FC	(Vietnam) Nguyen Duc Thang	(Vietnam) Nguyen Ngoc Duy	Made by club
Sanna Khanh Hoa BVN	(Vietnam) Vo Dinh Tan	(Vietnam) Tran Van Vu	Made by club
Long An FC	(Vietnam) Nguyen Minh Phuong	(Vietnam) Nguyen Tai Loc	(Italy) Kappa
Song Lam Nghe An	(Vietnam) Nguyen Duc Thang	(Vietnam) Tran Nguyen Manh	(England) Mitre
Quang Nam FC	(Vietnam) Hoang Van Phuc	(Vietnam) Dinh Thanh Trung	Made by club
Than Quang Ninh	(Vietnam) Phan Thanh Hung	(Vietnam) Vu Minh Tuan	(Spain) Joma
FLC Thanh Hoa	(Serbia) Ljupko Petrović	(Senegal) Pape Omar Faye	(England) Mitre

=== Managerial changes ===
Team	Outgoing manager	Manner of departure	Date of vacancy	Position	Incoming manager	Date of appointment
Becamex Binh Duong	(Vietnam) Nguyễn Thanh Sơn	Sacked	28 October 2016	Pre-season	(Vietnam) Trần Bình Sự	28 October 2016
FLC Thanh Hoa	(Vietnam) Hoàng Thanh Tùng	Sacked	4 December 2016	Pre-season	(Serbia) Ljupko Petrović	4 December 2016
Song Lam Nghe An	(Vietnam) Ngô Quang Trường	Sacked	28 December 2016	Pre-season	(Vietnam) Nguyễn Đức Thắng	28 December 2016
Long An FC	(Vietnam) Ngô Quang Sang	Sacked	21 February 2017	14th	(Vietnam) Nguyễn Minh Phương	24 February 2017
Hoang Anh Gia Lai	(Vietnam) Nguyễn Quốc Tuấn	Resigned	14 October 2017	12th	(Vietnam) Dương Minh Ninh	14 October 2017
Ho Chi Minh City FC	(France) Alain Fiard	Sacked	8 November 2017	11th	(Vietnam) Lư Đình Tuấn	8 November 2017

== Foreign players ==
Teams are allowed to use two foreign players and one naturalised player. Hanoi FC and Than Quang Ninh are allowed to have four foreign players (at least one AFC player) to play AFC Cup.

Club	Player 1	Player 2	Player 3	AFC Player	Naturalised Vietnamese Player	Former Players ^{1}
Becamex Binh Duong	(Burundi) Dugary Ndabashinze	(Brazil) Diogo Pereira			(Nigeria) → (Vietnam) Maxwell Eyerakpo	(Nigeria) Sunday Emmanuel
XSKT Cantho	(Cameroon) Nsi Amougou	(Nigeria) Sunday Emmanuel			(Nigeria) → (Vietnam) Dio Preye	(Uganda) Kisekka Henry
SHB Danang	(Argentina) Ezequiel Brítez	(Kosovo) Gramoz Kurtaj			(Argentina) → (Vietnam) Gastón Merlo	(Brazil) Eydison
Hoang Anh Gia Lai	(United States) Mobi Fehr	(Brazil) Henrique Motta				(Japan) Masaaki Ideguchi
Haiphong FC	(Jamaica) Diego Fagan	(Jamaica) Errol Stevens			(Ghana) → (Vietnam) Issifu Ansah	
Hanoi FC	(Uganda) Moses Oloya	(Nigeria) Oseni Ganiyu	(France) Loris Arnaud	(Philippines) Álvaro Silva	(Nigeria) → (Vietnam) Samson Kayode	(Argentina) Gonzalo Marronkle
Ho Chi Minh City FC	(Argentina) Víctor Ormazábal	(Mauritania) Dominique Da Sylva			(Nigeria) → (Vietnam) Theophilus Esele	(Russia) Rod Dyachenko
Saigon FC	(Brazil) Marcelo Fernandes	(Brazil) Patrick Cruz				
Sanna Khanh Hoa BVN	(France) Chaher Zarour	(France) Youssouf Touré				(Senegal) Diao Sadio
Long An FC	(Brazil) Wander Luiz	(Brazil) Eydison				(United States) Ashkanov Apollon (Nigeria) Oseni Ganiyu (South Korea) Sim Woon-sub
Song Lam Nghe An	(Nigeria) Michael Olaha	(Montenegro) Danko Kovačević				(Trinidad and Tobago) Henry Shackiel
Quang Nam FC	(Brazil) Claudecir	(Brazil) Thiago Papel			(Nigeria) → (Vietnam) Suleiman Oladoja Abdullahi	
Than Quang Ninh	(Democratic Republic of the Congo) Patiyo Tambwe	(Brazil) Marcus Vinícius	(Russia) Rod Dyachenko		(Uganda) → (Vietnam) Geoffrey Kizito	(Brazil) Ramon (Brazil) Jardel
FLC Thanh Hoa	(Senegal) Pape Omar Faye	(Nigeria) Uche Iheruome			(Netherlands) → (Vietnam) Danny van Bakel	

- ^1 Foreign players who left their clubs after first leg or be replaced because of injuries.

== League table ==
Pos	Team	Pld	W	D	L	GF	GA	GD	Pts	Qualification or relegation
1	Quang Nam FC (C)	26	13	9	4	46	32	+14	48 (Note: Quang Nam ahead of FLC Thanh Hoa by head-to-head record: TH 2-3 QN; QN 1-1 TH; Quang Nam failed to obtain an AFC license, and therefore are not eligible for continental qualification.)	
2	FLC Thanh Hoa (Q)	26	13	9	4	44	29	+15	48	Qualification to Champions League preliminary round 2 or AFC Cup Group stage
3	Hanoi FC	26	12	10	4	54	31	+23	46	
4	Than Quang Ninh	26	12	7	7	42	34	+8	43 (Note: Than Quang Ninh ahead of Saigon FC by head-to-head record: TQN 3-0 SG; SG 0-0 TQN)	
5	Saigon FC	26	11	10	5	40	29	+11	43	
6	Sanna Khanh Hoa (Q)	26	11	8	7	38	36	+2	41	Qualification to Mekong Club Championship
7	Haiphong FC	26	11	5	10	35	33	+2	38	
8	Song Lam Nghe An (Note: Song Lam Nghe An qualified to 2018 AFC Cup by winning 2017 Vietnamese Cup.) (Q)	26	8	10	8	36	36	0	34	Qualification to AFC Cup group stage
9	SHB Danang	26	8	9	9	36	35	+1	33	
10	Hoang Anh Gia Lai	26	9	3	14	34	43	−9	30 (Note: Hoang Anh Gia Lai ahead of Becamex Binh Duong by head-to-head record: HAGL 2-1 BD; BD 0-1 HAGL)	
11	Becamex Binh Duong	26	6	12	8	34	30	+4	30	
12	Ho Chi Minh City FC	26	6	7	13	29	46	−17	25	
13	XSKT Cantho	26	5	7	14	32	50	−18	22	
14	Long An FC (R)	26	2	4	20	30	66	−36	10	Relegation to V.League 2

Source: vnleague.com
Rules for classification: 1) Points; 2) Head-to-head points; 3) Head-to-head goal difference; 4) Head-to-head goals scored; 5) Goal difference; 6) Goals scored; 7) Disciplinary points (1 point for each yellow card, 3 points for each red card)
(C) Champions; (Q) Qualified for the phase indicated; (R) Relegated

== Results ==
Home \ Away	BBD	FTH	HNO	HPG	HAGL	HCM	LFC	QNA	SGN	SKH	SLNA	DNG	TQN	CTH
Becamex Binh Duong		2–2	2–0	2–2	0–1	1–0	4–0	0–1	1–3	0–1	0–0	3–4	0–1	1–1
FLC Thanh Hoa	1–1		3–3	1–1	5–3	1–0	2–1	2–3	1–1	2–0	2–0	3–2	1–0	1–0
Hanoi FC	0–0	2–1		2–0	3–0	4–0	4–0	1–0	2–2	2–3	1–0	1–1	3–2	4–0
Haiphong FC	0–2	0–0	1–1		1–2	4–1	3–2	2–0	0–1	3–1	1–1	2–0	2–0	3–1
Hoang Anh Gia Lai	2–1	2–3	3–2	1–2		0–1	1–2	1–0	1–1	0–2	0–2	0–1	4–2	3–0
Ho Chi Minh City FC	1–1	0–0	1–3	0–1	1–0		5–2	1–1	1–3	1–4	2–2	1–1	2–4	1–0
Long An FC	1–1	0–2	1–5	1–2	0–3	2–3		2–3	3–3	2–2	1–2	1–2	1–2	2–3
Quang Nam FC	1–1	1–1	2–1	2–1	1–1	3–1	1–1		1–1	2–2	3–3	1–1	2–1	2–1
Saigon FC	1–1	2–0	0–0	3–0	1–2	0–1	4–0	2–1		0–0	3–1	2–1	0–0	2–1
Sanna Khanh Hoa BVN	2–3	0–2	1–1	2–1	4–2	1–0	1–0	0–3	0–0		1–1	3–2	0–3	2–2
Song Lam Nghe An	1–1	0–1	1–2	2–3	2–0	1–1	3–2	2–4	2–0	2–2		2–1	1–1	1–1
SHB Danang	1–1	0–0	2–2	2–0	1–0	3–3	2–0	0–2	2–3	0–1	0–1		2–0	3–0
Than Quang Ninh	2–0	4–3	4–4	1–0	2–2	2–0	2–1	1–3	3–0	2–1	2–1	0–0		0–0
XSKT Cantho	1–5	1–4	1–1	2–0	3–0	2–1	1–2	2–3	4–2	1–2	1–2	2–2	1–1	

Source: Vietnam Professional Football
Legend: Blue = home team win; Yellow = draw; Red = away team win.

== Positions by round ==
This table lists the positions of teams after each week of matches. In order to preserve the chronological evolution, any postponed matches are not included to the round at which they were originally scheduled, but added to the full round they were played immediately afterwards. For example, if a match is scheduled for matchday 13, but then postponed and played between days 16 and 17, it will be added to the standings for day 16.

Team ╲ Round	1	2	3	4	5	6	7	8	9	10	11	12	13	14	15	16	17	18	19	20	21	22	23	24	25	26
Becamex Binh Duong	11	11	6	7	7	10	12	12	12	12	12	12	12	12	12	13	12	12	12	11	11	11	12	12	11	11
FLC Thanh Hoa	1	1	1	1	1	1	1	1	1	2	2	1	1	1	1	1	1	1	1	1	2	3	2	3	3	2
Hanoi FC	2	6	2	2	3	3	3	2	6	1	1	3	2	2	2	2	2	2	4	2	3	1	3	2	1	3
Haiphong FC	12	7	3	6	4	4	7	4	4	4	5	2	4	6	4	7	8	7	7	7	7	6	7	6	7	7
Hoang Anh Gia Lai	13	14	14	14	12	9	5	9	10	11	10	11	10	10	10	11	10	11	11	12	12	12	11	10	10	10
Ho Chi Minh City FC	8	12	10	11	13	8	6	5	5	8	9	9	9	9	9	9	9	10	9	10	10	10	10	11	12	12
Long An FC	3	3	7	10	11	14	14	14	14	14	14	14	14	14	14	14	14	14	14	14	14	14	14	14	14	14
Quang Nam FC	7	4	5	3	2	2	2	3	2	3	3	6	6	3	5	6	5	3	2	3	1	2	1	1	2	1
Saigon FC	4	2	4	5	6	7	11	11	9	9	8	7	7	4	3	4	3	4	3	5	6	7	6	7	6	5
Sanna Khanh Hoa BVN	5	9	9	9	10	11	9	8	3	7	4	4	3	5	7	5	4	5	5	4	4	4	5	4	5	6
Song Lam Nghe An	14	13	12	8	9	12	10	10	11	10	11	10	11	11	11	10	11	9	10	9	9	9	9	8	8	8
SHB Danang	6	8	8	4	5	5	8	6	7	6	7	8	8	8	8	8	7	8	8	8	8	8	8	9	9	9
Than Quang Ninh	9	5	11	12	8	6	4	7	8	5	6	5	5	7	6	3	6	6	6	6	5	5	4	5	4	4
XSKT Cantho	10	10	13	13	14	13	13	13	13	13	13	13	13	13	13	12	13	13	13	13	13	13	13	13	13	13

Winner; Champions League
Relegate to V.League 2

Source: Table by round (in Vietnamese)

== Season progress ==
Team ╲ Round	1	2	3	4	5	6	7	8	9	10	11	12	13	14	15	16	17	18	19	20	21	22	23	24	25	26
Becamex Binh Duong	L	D	W	D	D	L	D	D	L	L	W	D	D	L	L	L	W	W	D	D	L	D	D	D	W	W
FLC Thanh Hoa	W	W	W	D	W	D	D	W	D	L	W	W	D	W	D	W	L	L	W	D	D	L	W	D	W	W
Hanoi FC	W	L	W	W	D	D	D	D	W	W	D	D	W	W	D	L	W	L	D	W	D	W	L	W	W	D
Haiphong FC	L	W	W	L	W	D	L	W	D	W	D	W	D	L	W	L	L	W	L	D	W	W	L	W	L	L
Hoang Anh Gia Lai	L	L	L	D	W	W	W	L	L	L	W	L	D	W	L	L	W	L	L	L	L	D	W	W	W	L
Ho Chi Minh City FC	D	L	W	L	L	W	W	W	D	L	L	D	L	W	D	D	L	L	W	D	L	D	L	L	L	L
Long An FC	W	D	L	L	L	L	L	L	L	L	L	L	D	L	L	L	L	W	D	L	L	D	L	L	L	L
Quang Nam FC	D	W	D	W	W	D	D	L	W	W	L	L	D	W	D	D	W	W	W	D	W	D	W	W	L	W
Saigon FC	W	W	L	D	D	L	L	D	W	D	W	W	D	W	W	D	W	D	D	L	D	D	W	L	W	W
Sanna Khanh Hoa BVN	W	L	D	D	L	D	W	W	W	D	W	D	W	L	L	W	W	L	D	W	D	W	D	W	L	L
Song Lam Nghe An	L	D	D	W	L	L	W	D	L	W	D	D	L	D	D	D	L	W	D	W	W	L	D	W	W	L
SHB Danang	W	L	D	W	D	D	L	W	D	W	L	D	D	L	D	W	W	L	D	D	W	L	L	L	L	W
Than Quang Ninh	L	W	L	L	W	W	W	L	D	W	L	W	D	D	W	W	L	D	D	D	W	W	W	L	W	D
XSKT Cantho	L	D	L	D	L	W	L	L	D	L	D	L	D	L	W	W	L	W	L	D	L	L	D	L	L	W

Source: Vietnam Professional Football
W = Win; D = Draw; L = Lose

== Season statistics ==
As of 25 November 2017

=== Top scorers ===
Rank	Player	Club	Goals
1	(Vietnam) Nguyễn Anh Đức	Becamex Binh Duong	17
2	(Cameroon) Nsi Amougou	XSKT Cantho	16
2	(Russia) Rod Dyachenko	Ho Chi Minh City FC/Than Quang Ninh	16
4	(Jamaica) Errol Stevens	Haiphong FC	14
5	(Nigeria) Oseni Ganiyu	Long An FC/Hanoi FC	12
5	(Nigeria) Uche Iheruome	FLC Thanh Hoa	12
5	(Brazil) Claudecir	Quang Nam FC	12
8	(Senegal) Pape Omar Faye	FLC Thanh Hoa	11
9	(Vietnam) Đinh Thanh Trung	Quang Nam FC	10
9	(Vietnam) Hoàng Vũ Samson	Hanoi FC	10
9	(Democratic Republic of the Congo) Patiyo Tambwe	Than Quang Ninh	10

=== Own goals ===
Player	Club	Against	Round
(Vietnam) Pham Manh Hung	Song Lam Nghe An	Hanoi FC	1
(Vietnam) Que Ngoc Hai	Song Lam Nghe An	XSKT Cantho	2
(Vietnam) Nguyen Dinh Nhon	Sanna Khanh Hoa BVN	Than Quang Ninh	5
(Vietnam) Dang Quang Huy	Haiphong FC	Sanna Khanh Hoa BVN	7
(Vietnam) Dinh Tien Thanh	FLC Thanh Hoa	Hanoi FC	10
(Vietnam) Nguyen Thanh Trung	Long An FC	Saigon FC	11
(Vietnam) Nguyen Dinh Nhon	Sanna Khanh Hoa BVN	Than Quang Ninh	15
(Vietnam) Nguyen Anh Duc	Becamex Binh Duong	SHB Danang	16
(Vietnam) Tran Duc Cuong	Becamex Binh Duong	SHB Danang	16
(Vietnam) Lam Anh Quang	SHB Danang	Becamex Binh Duong	16
(Vietnam) Nguyen Anh Hung	Haiphong FC	Becamex Binh Duong	17
(Vietnam) Nguyen Cuu Huy Hoang	Sanna Khanh Hoa BVN	Haiphong FC	18
(Brazil) Henrique Motta	Hoang Anh Gia Lai	Long An FC	18
(Vietnam) Le Van Dai	FLC Thanh Hoa	Becamex Binh Duong	24

=== Hattrick ===
Player	For	Against	Result	Date
(Vietnam) Dinh Thanh Trung	Quang Nam FC	Than Quang Ninh	3–1	22 January 2017
(Argentina) Víctor Ormazábal	Ho Chi Minh City FC	Long An FC	5–2	19 February 2017
(Vietnam) Lam Ti Phong	Sanna Khanh Hoa BVN	Hoang Anh Gia Lai	4–2	1 October 2017
(Russia) Rod Dyachenko	Than Quang Ninh	Ho Chi Minh City FC	4–2	19 November 2017
(Russia) Rod Dyachenko	Than Quang Ninh	Hanoi FC	4–4^{4}	25 November 2017
(Vietnam) Nguyen Anh Duc	Becamex Binh Duong	Sanna Khanh Hoa BVN	3–2	25 November 2017
(Brazil) Marcelo Fernandes	Saigon FC	Haiphong FC	3–0	25 November 2017

- Note:

^{4}: scored 4 goals

== Awards ==
=== Monthly awards ===
Month	Club of the Month	Fair-play Club of the Month	Coach of the Month		Player of the Month	
Month	Club of the Month	Fair-play Club of the Month	Coach	Club	Player	Club
January	FLC Thanh Hoa	None	(Serbia) Ljupko Petrovic	FLC Thanh Hoa	(Vietnam) Dinh Thanh Trung	Quang Nam FC
February	Hoang Anh Gia Lai	None	(Serbia) Ljupko Petrovic	FLC Thanh Hoa	(Vietnam) Vu Minh Tuan	Than Quang Ninh
March; April	Hanoi FC	None	(Vietnam) Vo Dinh Tan	Sanna Khanh Hoa BVN	(Vietnam) Nguyen Hoang Quoc Chi	Sanna Khanh Hoa BVN
June; July	FLC Thanh Hoa	None	(Serbia) Ljupko Petrovic	FLC Thanh Hoa	(Senegal) Pape Omar Faye	FLC Thanh Hoa
September	Quang Nam FC	Than Quang Ninh	(Vietnam) Hoang Van Phuc	Quang Nam FC	(Vietnam) Dinh Thanh Trung	Quang Nam FC
October	Hanoi FC	Song Lam Nghe An	(Vietnam) Hoang Van Phuc	Quang Nam FC	(Vietnam) Nguyen Van Quyet	Hanoi FC
November		Hoang Anh Gia Lai				

No awards in May and August

=== Annual awards ===
==== Manager of the Season ====
(Vietnam) Hoang Van Phuc (Quang Nam FC)

==== Best player of the Season ====
(Vietnam) Dinh Thanh Trung (Quang Nam FC)

==== Best young player of the Season ====
(Vietnam) Nguyen Quang Hai (Hanoi FC)

==== Best Referee ====
(Vietnam) Vo Minh Tri

==== Best Assistant Referee ====
(Vietnam) Nguyen Trung Hau

==== Dream Team ====
Goalkeepers	Defenders	Midfielders	Forwards
(Vietnam) Nguyen Tuan Manh (Sanna Khanh Hoa BVN)	(Vietnam) Vu Van Thanh (Hoang Anh Gia Lai) (Vietnam) Hoang Van Khanh (Song Lam Nghe An) (Vietnam) Tran Dinh Trong (Saigon FC) (Vietnam) Do Van Thuan (Saigon FC)	(Vietnam) Nguyen Quang Hai (Hanoi FC) (Vietnam) Nguyen Huy Hung (Quang Nam FC) (Vietnam) Nguyen Hoang Quoc Chi (Sanna Khanh Hoa BVN) (Vietnam) Dinh Thanh Trung (Quang Nam FC)	(Jamaica) Errol Stevens (Haiphong FC) (Vietnam) Nguyen Anh Duc (Becamex Binh Duong)

==== Goal of the month ====
Month	Scorer	For	Against	Stadium	Date
January	(Vietnam) Nguyen Quang Hai	Hanoi FC	Than Quang Ninh	Hang Day Stadium	7 January 2017
February	(Vietnam) Vu Minh Tuan	Than Quang Ninh	Saigon FC	Cam Pha Stadium	26 February 2017
March; April	(Vietnam) Nguyen Tien Duy	Saigon FC	Long An FC	Thong Nhat Stadium	1 April 2017
June; July	(Senegal) Pape Omar Faye	FLC Thanh Hoa	SHB Danang	Thanh Hoa Stadium	24 June 2017
September	(Vietnam) Nguyen Quang Hai	Hanoi FC	Long An FC	Hang Day Stadium	1 October 2017
October	(Vietnam) Do Van Thuan	Saigon FC	Ho Chi Minh City FC	Thong Nhat Stadium	29 October 2017

== Attendances ==
As of 25 November 2017

=== By club ===
Pos	Team	Total	High	Low	Average	Change
1	FLC Thanh Hoa	120,000	13,000	7,000	9,231	+12.7%
2	Hoang Anh Gia Lai	109,000	11,000	4,000	8,385	+17.2%
3	SHB Danang	105,000	19,000	2,000	8,077	−12.1%
4	Haiphong FC	96,000	16,000	0	7,385	−45.8%
5	Than Quang Ninh	89,000	9,000	5,000	6,846	−10.6%
6	Quang Nam FC	83,500	14,000	1,500	6,423	+62.1%
7	Hanoi FC	80,500	18,000	1,000	6,192	+33.0%
8	Ho Chi Minh City FC	65,000	15,000	1,000	5,000	n/a^{†}
9	Sanna Khanh Hoa BVN	64,000	8,000	2,000	4,923	−14.1%
10	Song Lam Nghe An	55,500	8,000	2,000	4,269	−12.9%
11	Becamex Binh Duong	45,000	13,000	1,000	3,462	−33.0%
12	Saigon FC	44,000	10,000	1,000	3,385	+23.1%
13	Long An FC	32,700	8,000	200	2,515	−33.3%
14	XSKT Cantho	26,500	6,000	1,000	2,038	−50.5%
	League total	1,017,700	19,000	0	5,592	−11.3%

Updated to games played on 25 November 2017
Source: Vietnam Professional Football
Notes:
^{†} Teams played previous season in V.League 2

=== By round ===
2017 V.League 1 Attendance
Round	Total	Games	Avg. Per Game
Round 1	60,000	7	8,571
Round 2	33,000	7	4,714
Round 3	28,500	7	4,071
Round 4	35,000	7	5,000
Round 5	37,500	7	5,357
Round 6	56,500	7	8,071
Round 7	40,000	7	5,714
Round 8	44,000	7	6,286
Round 9	43,500	7	6,214
Round 10	47,000	7	6,714
Round 11	37,000	7	5,286
Round 12	38,000	7	5,429
Round 13	36,000	7	5,143
Round 14	38,500	7	5,500
Round 15	41,000	7	5,857
Round 16	45,000	7	6,429
Round 17	44,000	7	6,286
Round 18	34,000	7	4,857
Round 19	33,000	7	4,714
Round 20	29,000	7	4,143
Round 21	35,000	7	5,000
Round 22	36,000	7	5,143
Round 23	37,000	7	5,286
Round 24	38,000	7	5,429
Round 25	32,500	7	4,643
Round 26	38,700	7	5,529
Total	1,017,700	182	5,592

=== Highest attendances ===
Rank	Home team	Score	Away team	Attendance	Date	Stadium
1	SHB Danang	1–0	Hoang Anh Gia Lai	19,000	7 January 2017	Hoa Xuan Stadium
2	Hanoi FC	2–1	FLC Thanh Hoa	18,000	19 March 2017	Hang Day Stadium
3	Haiphong FC	0–1	Saigon FC	16,000	8 January 2017	Lach Tray Stadium
4	Ho Chi Minh City FC	2–2	Song Lam Nghe An	15,000	2 July 2017	Thong Nhat Stadium
5	Quang Nam FC	3–1	Ho Chi Minh City FC	14,000	25 November 2017	Tam Ky Stadium
