= 2013 V.League 2 =

V.League 2
- Season: 2013
- Dates: 9 March – 6 July
- Champions: QNK Quảng Nam (1st division title)
- Promoted: QNK Quảng Nam; Than Quảng Ninh; Hùng Vương An Giang
- Relegated: TDC Bình Dương
- Matches: 112
- Goals: 174 (1.55 per match)
- Top goalscorer: Uche Iheruome & Đinh Thanh Trung ~10 goals
- Biggest home win: Bình Định 5–1 TDC Bình Dương (27 April 2013)
- Biggest away win: Hà Nội 0-5 XSKT Cần Thơ (15 June 2013)
- Highest attendance: 7,000
- Lowest attendance: 300

The 2013 V.League 2 (known as the Eximbank V.League 2 for sponsorship reasons) season was the 19th season of Vietnam's second tier professional football league that started on 9 March 2013.

QNK Quảng Nam won its first ever V.League 2 title on 29 June 2013 after defeating Than Quảng Ninh 4–2, taking the season series and securing the league title.

== Teams ==
A total of 10 teams will contest the league, including 9 sides from the 2012 season.

Relegation for Thành phố Hồ Chí Minh and XM Fico Tây Ninh to the 2013 Vietnamese Second Division was confirmed on the final matchday on 19 August 2012.

Hà Nội were to be promoted to the 2013 V-League season but returned to the league because they could not find a separate title sponsor than their parent club. TĐCS Đồng Tháp were relegated from the 2012 V-League season. Vicem Hải Phòng, who were relegated from the 2012 V-League season, will return to compete in the 2013 V-League season after purchasing the place of dissolved Khatoco Khánh Hòa.

Hà Nội B was dissolved on 27 November 2012 when club officials could not secure a new sponsor after the earlier arrest of Chairman Nguyen Duc Kien caused all sponsorship from his assets to be blocked.

SHB Đà Nẵng B and 2012 Vietnamese Second Division champions and runners-up, Bà Rịa–Vũng Tàu and Khatoco Khánh Hòa B, were officially dissolved at a league meeting on 8 December 2012.

The VPF decided to keep the number of participating clubs at 10, not promoting other clubs from the Vietnamese Second Division due to new league regulations on club management.

On 8 December 2012, the VPF had stated that the Vietnam U22 team would be added to the V-League to gain experience ahead of the 2013 Southeast Asian Games and to bring the participating number of clubs to 12. However, the Vietnam Football Federation announced on December 13, 2012, that 2012 Vietnamese First Division second runners-up Đồng Nai would be the twelfth club in the 2013 campaign.

XSKT Lâm Đồng officially withdraw.

=== Stadia and locations ===
Locations of the First Division 2013 teams

Club	Home stadium	Capacity
Hùng Vương An Giang	Long Xuyên Stadium	15,000
SQC Bình Định	Quy Nhơn Stadium	25,000
TDC Bình Dương	Gò Đậu Stadium	18,250
XSKT Cần Thơ	Cần Thơ Stadium	50,000
TDCS Đồng Tháp	Cao Lãnh Stadium	23,000
Hà Nội	Hàng Đẫy Stadium	22,000
QNK Quảng Nam	Tam Kỳ Stadium	15,624
Than Quảng Ninh	Cửa Ông Stadium	10,000

=== Personnel and kits ===
Note: Flags indicate national team as has been defined under FIFA eligibility rules. Players and Managers may hold more than one non-FIFA nationality.

Team	Manager	Captain
Hùng Vương An Giang	(Vietnam) Nhan Thiện Nhân	(Brazil) Agostinho
Bình Định	(Vietnam) Nguyễn Đình Lợi	(Vietnam) Phan Như Thuật
TDC Bình Dương	(Vietnam) Đặng Trần Chỉnh	(Vietnam) Nguyễn Chí Huynh
XSKT Cần Thơ	(Vietnam) Vuong Tien Dung	(Vietnam) Trần Minh Son
TDCS Đồng Tháp	(Vietnam) Phạm Công Lộc	(Vietnam) Nguyễn Duy Khanh
Hà Nội	(Vietnam) Trương Việt Hoàng	(Vietnam) Trần Đăng Bình
QNK Quảng Nam	(Vietnam) Vũ Quang Bảo	(Vietnam) Nguyễn Văn Việt
Than Quảng Ninh	(Vietnam) Đinh Cao Nghĩa	(Vietnam) Nguyễn Xuân Quyết

=== Managerial changes ===
Team	Outgoing Head Coach	Date of vacancy	Manner of departure	Incoming Head Coach	Date of appointment
TĐCS Đồng Tháp	(Vietnam) Trần Công Minh	16 April 2013	Sacked	(Vietnam) Phạm Công Lộc	16 April 2013
Hà Nội	(Vietnam) Hoang Van Phuc	21 April 2013	Resigned	(Vietnam) Triệu Quang Hà	22 April 2013
Cần Thơ	(Vietnam) Huỳnh Ngọc San	27 April 2013	Sacked	(Vietnam) Vuong Tien Dung	27 April 2013
QNK Quảng Nam	(Vietnam) Nguyen Van Thinh	29 April 2013	Sacked	(Vietnam) Vu Quang Bao	
Hà Nội	(Vietnam) Triệu Quang Hà	28 May 2013	Sacked	(Vietnam) Trương Việt Hoàng	29 May 2013
Bình Định	(Vietnam) Nguyễn Văn Hùng	8 June 2013	Sacked	(Vietnam) Nguyễn Đình Lợi	8 June 2013

=== Foreign players ===
Club	Visa 1	Visa 2	Naturalized
Hùng Vương An Giang	(Brazil) Agostinho	(Nigeria) Uche Iheruome	(Zimbabwe) Tostao Kwashi^{1}
Bình Định	(Mali) Kalifa Dembela	(Nigeria) Andrew Uzoma	None
TDC Bình Dương	(Togo) Vincent Bossou	(Nigeria) Kpenosen Samson	None
XSKT Cần Thơ	(Nigeria) Mustapha Essuman	(Mali) Souleymane Diabate	None
TDCS Đồng Tháp	(Nigeria) Emeka Oguwike	(Jamaica) Andre Diego Fagan	None
Hà Nội	(Argentina) Lucas Cantoro	(Argentina) Leonel Ezeguiel Felice	None
QNK Quảng Nam	(Ghana) David Annas	(Argentina) Nicolás Hernández	None
Than Quảng Ninh	(Ghana) Daniel Obo	(Cameroon) Didier Belibi	None

Note:
^{1}Those players who were born and started their professional career abroad but have since gained Vietnamese Residency;
^{2}Foreign residents who have chosen to represent Vietnam national team;
^{3}Vietnamese residents who have chosen to represent another national team

== League table ==
Pos	Team	Pld	W	D	L	GF	GA	GD	Pts	Promotion or relegation
1	QNK Quảng Nam (C, P)	14	7	4	3	30	22	+8	25	2014 V.League 1
2	Than Quảng Ninh (P)	14	7	4	3	24	17	+7	25	2014 V.League 1
3	Hùng Vương An Giang (P)	14	7	3	4	26	22	+4	24	2014 V.League 1
4	TĐCS Đồng Tháp	14	7	3	4	20	18	+2	24	
5	XSKT Cần Thơ	14	6	3	5	31	25	+6	21	
6	Bình Định	14	3	3	8	20	23	−3	12	
7	Hà Nội	14	3	3	8	10	23	−13	12	
8	TDC Bình Dương (R)	14	3	3	8	13	24	−11	12	2014 Vietnamese Second Division

Updated to match(es) played on 7 July 2013. Source: Vietnamese First Division
Rules for classification: 1) points; 2) goal difference; 3) number of goals scored.
(C) Champions; (P) Promoted; (R) Relegated

== Results ==
Home \ Away	HAG	BĐ	TBD	XCT	TDT	HAN	QNA	TQN
Hùng Vương An Giang		1–1	1–0	3–2	3–1	0–0	6–4	2–1
Bình Định	2–4		5–1	2–3	1–2	1–0	1–2	2–2
TDC Bình Dương	1–0	1–0		3–2	1–2	1–1	1–1	1–2
XSKT Cần Thơ	4–1	4–1	2–2		2–1	3–2	0–0	1–1
TĐCS Đồng Tháp	0–2	1–0	1–0	4–2		2–1	2–2	3–1
Hà Nội	2–1	1–0	1–0	0–5	0–0		0–1	1–2
QNK Quảng Nam	2–2	0–3	5–1	2–1	3–1	3–0		4–2
Than Quảng Ninh	2–0	1–1	1–0	3–0	0–0	4–1	2–1	

Updated to match(es) played on 6 July 2013. Source: Vietnamese First Division
Legend: Blue = home team win; Yellow = draw; Red = away team win.

== Season statistics ==
=== Top scorers ===
As of 6 July 2013.

Rank	Player	Club	Goals
1	(Nigeria) Uche Iheruome	Hùng Vương An Giang	10
1	(Vietnam) Đinh Thanh Trung	QNK Quảng Nam	10
3	(Ghana) David Annas	QNK Quảng Nam	9
4	(Brazil) Agostinho	Hùng Vương An Giang	8
4	(Mali) Souleymane Diabate	XSKT Cần Thơ	8
6	(Mali) Kalifa Dembela	Bình Định	7
6	(Nigeria) Mustapha Essuman	XSKT Cần Thơ	7
8	(Cameroon) Belibi Celestin Didier	Than Quảng Ninh	6
9	(Vietnam) Vũ Minh Tuấn	Than Quảng Ninh	5
9	(Argentina) Lucas Cantoro	CLB Hà Nội	5

=== Scoring ===
- First goal of the season: Uche Iheruome for Hùng Vương An Giang against Than Quảng Ninh (9 March 2013)
- Fastest goal of the season: 1 minute, Nguyễn Mạnh Tuấn for Than Quảng Ninh against Hà Nội (30 March 2013)
- Largest winning margin: 5 goals
  - Hà Nội 0–5 XSKT Cần Thơ (15 June 2013)
- Highest scoring game(s): 10 goals
  - Hùng Vương An Giang 6-4 QNK Quảng Nam (6 July 2013)
- Most goals scored in a match by a single team: 6 goals
  - Hùng Vương An Giang 6-4 QNK Quảng Nam (6 July 2013)
- Most goals scored in a match by a losing team(s): 4 goals
  - Hùng Vương An Giang 6-4 QNK Quảng Nam (6 July 2013)

=== Clean sheets ===
- Most clean sheets: 4
  - TĐCS Đồng Tháp
- Fewest clean sheets: 0
  - TDC Bình Dương

=== Discipline ===
- Most yellow cards (club): 26
  - Than Quảng Ninh
- Most yellow cards (player): 5
  - Nguyễn Tuấn Anh (Than Quảng Ninh)
- Most red cards (club): 3
  - Hà Nội
- Most red cards (players): 1
  - Vũ Trọng Thông (Hùng Vương An Giang)
  - Nguyễn Hữu Tài (Bình Định)
  - Đỗ Trọng Hòa (XSKT Cần Thơ)
  - Trần Minh Sen (XSKT Cần Thơ)
  - Nguyễn Huy Hùng (Hà Nội)
  - Nguyễn Huỳnh Điệp (Hà Nội)
  - Triệu Văn Mạnh (Hà Nội)
  - Nguyễn Tuấn Anh (Than Quảng Ninh)
