= Trần Văn Vũ =

Trần Văn Vũ may refer to:

- Trần Văn Vũ (futsal player) (born 1990)
- Trần Văn Vũ (footballer, born 1992)
- Trần Văn Vũ (footballer, born 1994)
