= Cao Văn Triền =

Vietnamese footballer (born 1993)

Personal information
- Full name: Cao Văn Triền
- Date of birth: 18 June 1993 (age 33)
- Place of birth: Hoài Nhơn, Bình Định, Vietnam
- Height: 1.68 m (5 ft 6 in)
- Position: Midfielder

Team information
- Current team: Becamex Hồ Chí Minh City
- Number: 23

Youth career
- 2006–2012: Bình Định

Senior career*
Years	Team	Apps	(Gls)
2012–2016	Bình Định	27	(3)
2013–2016	→ Khánh Hòa (loan)	12	(0)
2017–2022	Sài Gòn	117	(1)
2023–2026	Quy Nhơn United	86	(0)
2026–	Becamex Hồ Chí Minh City	0	(0)
- * Club domestic league appearances and goals as of 6 June 2026

Cao Văn Triền (born 18 June 1993) is a Vietnamese professional footballer who plays as a midfielder for V.League 2 club Becamex Hồ Chí Minh City.

== Career ==
Văn Triền started his career with V.League 2 side Khánh Hòa, helping them achieve promotion to the Vietnamese top flight.

At the start of the 2017 season, Văn Triền signed for Sài Gòn.

In 2021, when Văn Triền was about to join Japanese club FC Ryukyu, the deal collapsed.

In August 2026, Văn Triền moved to V.League 2 club Becamex Hồ Chí Minh City.

== Honours ==
Individual

- V.League 1 Team of the Season: 2020
