= Nguyễn Văn Đạt =

Vietnamese footballer (born 1998)

Personal information
- Full name: Nguyễn Văn Đạt
- Date of birth: 20 May 1998 (age 28)
- Place of birth: Hanoi, Vietnam
- Height: 1.80 m (5 ft 11 in)
- Position: Centre back

Team information
- Current team: Bắc Ninh
- Number: 16

Youth career
- 2015–2018: Hà Nội

Senior career*
Years	Team	Apps	(Gls)
2018–2021	Hồng Lĩnh Hà Tĩnh	14	(0)
2020	→ Phố Hiến (loan)	9	(2)
2022	Sài Gòn	17	(0)
2023–2024	Hải Phòng	19	(1)
2024–2025	Quảng Nam	8	(0)
2025–	Bắc Ninh	17	(1)

International career^{‡}
2019	Vietnam U23	4	(0)
Medal record
Men's football
Representing Vietnam
AFF U-23 Championship
Bronze medal – third place	Cambodia 2019
- * Club domestic league appearances and goals as of 12 September 2025 ‡ National team caps and goals as of 26 February 2019

Nguyễn Văn Đạt (born 20 May 1998) is a Vietnamese professional footballer who plays as a centre-back for V.League 1 club Bắc Ninh.

== Club career ==
Born in Hanoi, Văn Đạt was formed at the Hà Nội FC academy. He made his senior debut with Hà Nội's B team (which later became Hồng Lĩnh Hà Tĩnh) in the 2018 V.League 2 season. In the following season, the team won the 2019 V.League 2 and gained promotion to the top tier of the country. He spent another season in the V.League 2 while being loaned to Phố Hiến during one season, before making his V.League 1 debut with Hồng Lĩnh Hà Tĩnh in 2021.

On 14 December 2021, Văn Đạt joined V.League 1 fellow Sài Gòn. As a starter of the team, he appeared in 17 games but failed to prevent the team from relegation.

In December 2022, Văn Đạt joined Hải Phòng as a free agent.

In August 2024, Văn Đạt signed for Quảng Nam.

== International career ==
With Vietnam under-23s, Văn Đạt took part in the 2019 AFF U-22 Youth Championship and helped his team finished in the third place.

== Honours ==
Hồng Lĩnh Hà Tĩnh

- V.League 2: 2019

Individual

- V.League 2 Team of the Season: 2025–26
