= Diao Sadio =

Senegalese footballer

Sadio Diao
Personal information
- Date of birth: 31 July 1990 (age 36)
- Place of birth: Senegal
- Position: Forward

Team information
- Current team: Sanna Khánh Hòa BVN F.C.
- Number: 10

Senior career*
Years	Team	Apps	(Gls)
2016	Quang Nam F.C.	15	(7)
2016– 2017	Khanh Hoa F.C.	13	(6)
- * Club domestic league appearances and goals

Sadio Diao (born 31 July 1990) is a Senegalese professional footballer.

Following the 2016 V.League 1, Quang Nam decided to rescind his contract with them.

The African was recruited by Khanh Hoa to reinforce their forward line.

Diao formed an attacking partnership with Brazilian Claudecir while playing for Khanh Hoa.
