= Đinh Thanh Trung =

Vietnamese footballer (born 1988)

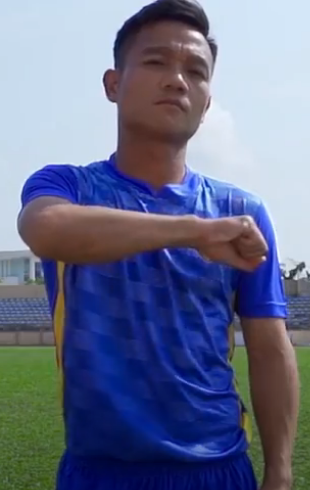
- Thanh Trung in 2021

Personal information
- Full name: Đinh Thanh Trung
- Date of birth: 24 January 1988 (age 38)
- Place of birth: Hương Khê, Hà Tĩnh, Vietnam
- Height: 1.65 m (5 ft 5 in)
- Positions: Attacking midfielder; winger

Youth career
- 1998–2007: Hà Tĩnh
- 2007: Hòa Phát Hà Nội

Senior career*
Years	Team	Apps	(Gls)
2007–2011	Hòa Phát Hà Nội	86	(29)
2012	Hà Nội ACB	3	(2)
2013–2021	Quảng Nam	173	(71)
2022–2024	Hồng Lĩnh Hà Tĩnh	42	(4)
Total		304	(106)

International career
2003–2004	Vietnam U16	5	(2)
2010–2012	Vietnam U23	6	(1)
2010–2018	Vietnam	23	(2)
- * Club domestic league appearances and goals

Đinh Thanh Trung (Note: In this Vietnamese name, the surname is Đinh, but is often simplified to Dinh in English-language text. In accordance with Vietnamese custom, this person should be referred to by the given name, Trung.) (born 24 January 1988) is a Vietnamese former professional footballer who mainly played as an attacking midfielder or winger.

Trung appeared 28 times and scored 2 goals for Vietnam national team between 2010 and 2018, taking part in three AFF Championships. After leading Quảng Nam to the 2017 V.League 1 title, Trung was awarded the Vietnamese Golden Ball.

In May 2024, Trung was arrested for illegal drug use in Hà Tĩnh and was later sentenced to four years and six months in prison.

== Early career ==
Born in Hà Tĩnh, Trung started his career at his local club Hà Tĩnh, joining the team when he was 10 years old. In 2007, following a friendly game between the youth side of Hà Tĩnh and Hòa Phát Hà Nội, Trung's performance impressed the staffs of the Hòa Phát Hà Nội, leading in his signing to the club shortly after.

== Club career ==
=== Debut at Hòa Phát Hà Nội, then move to Hà Nội ACB ===
With Hòa Phát Hà Nội, Trung emerged as one of the rising stars of Vietnamese football. After 86 appearances for the club, he netted 29 goals, with several goals from free kick or long range shots. In 2011, the club merged with Hà Nội ACB, resulting in Trung's move to the club. In January 2012, he was released from Hà Nội ACB after an internal conflict in where he refused to play for the club in an league game.

=== Quảng Nam ===
In 2013, Trung joined V.League 2 side Quảng Nam. In his first season with the club, he finished as the league's joint top scorer with 10 goals scored, leading Quảng Nam to win the 2013 V.League 2 and promote to the V.League 1 for the first time in the team's history. He was then named team captain and played a crucial role at helping team won their first V.League 1 title in 2017 in their fourth season at V.League 1. His contribution in Quảng Nam's historic achievement lead him winning the Vietnamese Golden Ball in 2017. He left the club in the end of the 2021 season, after 9 years, having scored 80 goals after 213 matches.

=== Hồng Lĩnh Hà Tĩnh ===
In 2022, Trung signed for the club of his hometown Hồng Lĩnh Hà Tĩnh and was appointed as the team captain.

== International career ==
Trung received his first called up to the Vietnam national team for the 2010 AFF Championship. He made his international debut while coming on as a substitute in a 7–1 win over Myanmar in the opening match of the tournament. Four years later, he participated in his second AFF Championship, under the guidance of coach Toshiya Miura.

In 2016, at the AYA Bank Cup final against Singapore, he scored in the extra time to help Vietnam win 3–0, which was also his first goal for the national team. At the 2016 AFF Championship, Trung appeared in 5 matches, as the team reached the semi-finals before losing 3–4 on aggregate to Indonesia. After the tournament, Thanh Trung was named as the new captain of Vietnam national team following the retirement of Lê Công Vinh.

In October 2018, Trung was named in the preliminary squad for the 2018 AFF Championship but he did not make the final cut. This decision lead Trung to announce his retirement from international football.

== Arrest and sentence ==
On 4 May 2024, Trung and four other teammates at Hồng Lĩnh Hà Tĩnh were arrested in a hotel in Hà Tĩnh on drug-related charges. The Vietnam Football Federation immediately suspended these players from all football activities and Hồng Lĩnh Hà Tĩnh also removed them from the squad. In the trial held on 27 August 2024, the People's Court of Hà Tĩnh sentenced Trung to 4 years and 6 months in prison for organizing illegal use of drugs.

== Career statistics ==
=== International ===
Appearances and goals by national team and year
National team	Year	Apps	Goals
Vietnam	2010	1	0
Vietnam	2014	4	0
Vietnam	2016	12	1
Vietnam	2017	5	1
Vietnam	2018	1	0
Total		23	2

==== Vietnam U23 ====
#	Date	Venue	Opponent	Score	Result	Competition
1.	6 June 2010	Guangdong Provincial People's Stadium, Guangzhou, China	Bahrain	1–0	3–1	2010 Asian Games

==== Vietnam ====
Scores and results list Vietnam's goal tally first.

#	Date	Venue	Opponent	Score	Result	Competition
1.	6 June 2016	Thuwunna Stadium, Yangon, Myanmar	Singapore	3–0	3–0 (a.e.t.)	2016 AYA Bank Cup
2.	10 October 2017	Mỹ Đình National Stadium, Hanoi, Vietnam	Cambodia	1–0	5–0	2019 AFC Asian Cup qualification

== Honours ==
=== Club ===
Quảng Nam

- V.League 2:

(gold) Winners: 2013

- V.League 1:

(gold) Winners: 2017

- Vietnamese Super Cup:

(gold) Winners: 2017

=== Individuals ===
- V.League 2 top scorer: 2013
- V.League 1 Team of the year: 2015, 2016, 2017
- V.League 1 Best player: 2017
- Vietnamese Golden Ball: 2017
