= Lưu Tự Nhân =

Vietnamese footballer (born 2001)

Personal information
- Full name: Lưu Tự Nhân
- Date of birth: 18 December 2001 (age 24)
- Place of birth: Bình Tân, Vĩnh Long, Vietnam
- Height: 1.80 m (5 ft 11 in)
- Position: Midfielder

Team information
- Current team: Đồng Nai City
- Number: 20

Youth career
- 2014–2020: Vĩnh Long
- 2020–2022: Becamex Bình Dương

Senior career*
Years	Team	Apps	(Gls)
2022–2023	Becamex Bình Dương	7	(0)
2023–	Đồng Nai City	55	(13)
- * Club domestic league appearances and goals as of 6 June 2026

Lưu Tự Nhân (born 18 December 2001) is a Vietnamese professional footballer who plays as a midfielder for V.League 1 club Đồng Nai City.

== Early career ==
Born in Vĩnh Long, Tự Nhân was a youth product of the province's football team. In 2020, he moved to Becamex Bình Dương for better playing opportunities.

== Club career ==
In the 2022 V.League 1, Tự Nhân made his professional debut with Becamex Bình Dương. Ahead of the 2023–24 season, he was transferred to V.League 2 side Trường Tươi Bình Phước. He helped Bình Phước finished twice as V.League 2 runners-up in the 2023–24 and 2024–25 season, and was named in the league's Team of the Season both times. Additionally, he was the top scorer of the 2024–25 V.League 2 with 9 goals scored.

== Honours ==
Trường Tươi Đồng Nai

- V.League 2: 2025–26

Individual

- V.League 2 top scorer: 2024–25
- V.League 2 Team of the Season: 2023–24, 2024–25, 2025–26
