= Diệp Hoài Xuân =

Cambodian-Vietnamese footballer

Diệp Hoài Xuân Ream Srerng រៀម សុឺង
Personal information
- Full name: Diệp Hoài Xuân
- Date of birth: 9 November 1992 (age 34)
- Place of birth: Cà Mau province, Vietnam
- Height: 1.84 m (6 ft 1/2 in)
- Position: Centre back

Youth career
- Ca Mau FC

Senior career*
Years	Team	Apps	(Gls)
2013–2014	Vinh Long F.C.		
2015	Ca Mau F.C.		
2015–2016	Kirivong Sok Sen Chey	?	(?)
2016	Dong Thap	26	(0)
2016–2018	Hải Phòng	16	(0)
2018	Hồ Chí Minh City	2	(0)
2019	Phnom Penh Crown	13	(0)
2020–2022	Nagaworld	38	(1)
- * Club domestic league appearances and goals as of 23 June 2019

Diệp Hoài Xuân, also known in Cambodia as Ream Srerng (Khmer: រៀម សុឺង, born 9 November 1992) is a Vietnamese footballer who plays as a centre back.

== Personal life ==
Xuân was born to a poor Khmer Krom family in Cà Mau province. A tall and gifted footballer, he joined the local youth team of Cà Mau. He has dual Cambodian–Vietnamese citizenship. As for the result, he is eligible to represent either Cambodia and Vietnam.

== Club career ==
Xuân initially had aspirations to join Dong Thap FC, but after he was told he didn't have any opportunity there he spent the next three years playing for lower club sides in the second and third division. In 2015, he joined Kirivong Sok Sen Chey and played a crucial role in the team's season, and was awarded Cambodian citizenship as a result, even though they did finish last in the 2015 Cambodian League. In 2016, he finally joined Dong Thap FC and started playing in top flight football in Vietnam.

At the end of the 2016 season Dong Thap finished bottom of the league and were relegated. However on 21 September 2016, just three days after the last match, runners up Hải Phòng revealed that they had been tracking Hoài Xuân's progress for some time and agreed to sign him.

== Playing style ==
Hoài Xuân is known as a versatile player, he initially started out as a goalkeeper while he was playing in the youth club, and then became a forward as he played in the lower divisions and Cambodian league. He now plays as a central defender for Dong Thap FC.
