= Huỳnh Tuấn Linh =

Vietnamese footballer (born 1991)

Personal information
- Full name: Huỳnh Tuấn Linh
- Date of birth: 17 April 1991 (age 35)
- Place of birth: Hạ Long, Quảng Ninh, Vietnam
- Height: 1.80 m (5 ft 11 in)
- Position: Goalkeeper

Team information
- Current team: Bắc Ninh
- Number: 26

Youth career
- 2005–2011: Than Quảng Ninh

Senior career*
Years	Team	Apps	(Gls)
2011–2020	Than Quảng Ninh	225	(0)
2021–2022	Hoàng Anh Gia Lai	43	(0)
2023–2025	Quy Nhơn Bình Định	30	(0)
2025–	Bắc Ninh	20	(0)

International career^{‡}
2016–2017	Vietnam	3	(0)
- * Club domestic league appearances and goals as of 22 June 2025 ‡ National team caps and goals as of 11 October 2017

Huỳnh Tuấn Linh (born 17 April 1991) is a Vietnamese professional footballer who plays as a goalkeeper for V.League 2 club Bắc Ninh. He has also played for the Vietnamese national team.

== Honours ==
Than Quảng Ninh

- Vietnamese National Cup: 2016
- Vietnamese Super Cup: 2017

Individual

- V.League 1 Team of the Season: 2015
- V.League 2 Team of the Season: 2025–26
