= Nguyễn Tiến Duy =

Vietnamese footballer

Personal information
- Full name: Nguyễn Tiến Duy
- Date of birth: April 29, 1991 (age 35)
- Place of birth: Cẩm Phả, Quảng Ninh, Vietnam
- Height: 1.80 m (5 ft 11 in)
- Position: Defender

Youth career
- 2010–2012: Than Quảng Ninh

Senior career*
Years	Team	Apps	(Gls)
2013–2016	Than Quảng Ninh	29	(0)
2016–2019	Sài Gòn	40	(1)
2019–2021	Than Quảng Ninh	24	(0)
2022–2023	Topeland Bình Định	18	(0)
2024	Quảng Nam	1	(0)

International career
2015	Vietnam	2	(0)
- * Club domestic league appearances and goals as of 6 August 2023

Nguyễn Tiến Duy (born 29 April 1991) is a former Vietnamese footballer who played as a defender. He earned two international caps for the Vietnam national team.

== Club career ==
Originally a member of Than Quảng Ninh's youth team, Duy was promoted to the first team at the beginning of the 2013 campaign. After three seasons with the club, he moved to fellow V.League 1 club Saigon. Having spent two seasons at Saigon FC, he moved back to Than Quảng Ninh in January 2019.

In September 2021, Duy joined Topeland Bình Định, following his release by Than Quảng Ninh, before joining Quảng Nam two years later.

== International career ==
On 1 October 2015, Duy received his first international call-up to the full Vietnam national team from manager Toshiya Miura, for the FIFA World Cup 2018 qualifying matches against Iraq and Thailand. He made his debut on 8 October playing in the whole match in Vietnam's 1–1 draw with Iraq at Mỹ Đình National Stadium.

== Career statistics ==
=== International ===
Appearances and goals by national team and year
National team	Year	Apps	Goals
Vietnam	2015	2	0
Total		2	0

== Honours ==
Than Quảng Ninh

- V.League 2 runner-up: 2013
- Vietnamese National Cup: 2016
- Vietnamese Super Cup: 2016
