= Claudecir (footballer, born 1989) =

Brazilian footballer

Personal information
- Full name: Claudecir dos Reis Rodrigues Júnior
- Date of birth: 29 June 1989 (age 37)
- Place of birth: Rio de Janeiro, Brazil
- Height: 1.85 m (6 ft 1 in)
- Position: Forward

Youth career
- Mirassol
- Paranavaí
- Juventus-SP

Senior career*
Years	Team	Apps	(Gls)
2009	Marcílio Dias	2	(0)
2010	CFZ	12	(2)
2011	Artsul	8	(0)
2012	Tanabi	5	(0)
2013	Brasília	2	(0)
2014	Brasiliense	11	(2)
2015	Cabofriense	3	(0)
2016	Anapolina	1	(0)
2016	Ceilândia	8	(2)
2016–2019	Quảng Nam	57	(30)
2020	Hải Phòng	10	(0)
2020	→ Than Quảng Ninh (loan)	10	(4)
2021	Hồng Lĩnh Hà Tĩnh	2	(0)
2021	SHB Đà Nẵng	2	(0)
- * Club domestic league appearances and goals as of 2 May 2021

Claudecir dos Reis Rodrigues Júnior (born 29 June 1989), commonly known as Claudecir, is a retired Brazilian footballer who played as a forward.

== Career statistics ==
As of 25 Apr 2021.

Club	Season	League			State League		Cup		Other		Total	
Club	Season	Division	Apps	Goals	Apps	Goals	Apps	Goals	Apps	Goals	Apps	Goals
Marcílio Dias	2009	Série C	2	0	0	0	0	0	0	0	2	0
Tanabi	2012	–			4 (Note: Appearances in Campeonato Paulista Série A2)	0	0	0	0	0	4	0
Brasília	2014	–			1 (Note: Appearances in Campeonato Brasiliense)	0	1 (Note: Appearances in the Copa do Brasil)	0	5 (Note: Appearances in Copa Verde)	0	7	0
Brasiliense	2014	Série D	11	2	0	0	0	0	0	0	11	2
Anapolina	2016	Série D	0	0	8 (Note: Appearances in Campeonato Goiano)	2	0	0	0	0	8	2
QNK Quảng Nam	2016	V.League 1	14	12	–		0	0	0	0	14	12
QNK Quảng Nam	2017	V.League 1	23	12	–		0	0	0	0	23	12
QNK Quảng Nam	2018	V.League 1	7	3	–		0	0	0	0	7	3
QNK Quảng Nam	2019	V.League 1	7	1	–		0	0	0	0	7	1
QNK Quảng Nam	Total		51	28	–|		0	0	0	0	51	28
Hải Phòng	2020	V.League 1	10	0	–		0	0	0	0	10	0
Than Quảng Ninh	2020	V.League 1	10	4	–		0	0	0	0	10	4
Hồng Lĩnh Hà Tĩnh	2021	V.League 1	2	0	–		0	0	0	0	2	0
SHB Đà Nẵng	2021	V.League 1	2	0	–		0	0	0	0	2	0
Career total			88	34	13	2	1	0	5	0	107	36

== Honours ==
Criciúma Esporte Clube

- Campeonato Catarinense: 2013

Brasiliense

- Copa Verde: 2014

Quảng Nam

- V.League 1: 2017
- Vietnamese Super Cup runner-up: 2018

Individuals

- Best Foreign Player of the Year in Vietnam: 2017
