= Nguyễn Xuân Thành =

Vietnamese footballer

Personal information
- Full name: Nguyễn Xuân Thành
- Date of birth: November 10, 1985 (age 41)
- Place of birth: Ninh Giang, Hải Dương, Vietnam
- Height: 1.70 m (5 ft 7 in)
- Positions: Left back; left midfielder

Youth career
- 1995–2002: Hà Nội ACB

Senior career*
Years	Team	Apps	(Gls)
2003	Hà Nội ACB	1	(0)
2004–2005	Hòa Phát Hà Nội	17	(0)
2006–2011	Hà Nội ACB	23	(1)
2012	Hà Nội	21	(0)
2013–2014	FLC Thanh Hóa	36	(1)
2015–2018	Becamex Bình Dương	60	(0)
2018–2019	Thanh Hóa	13	(0)

International career^{‡}
2010–2015	Vietnam	9	(0)
- * Club domestic league appearances and goals as of 21 July 2018 ‡ National team caps and goals as of 22 March 2015

Nguyễn Xuân Thành (born November 10, 1985, in Vietnam) is a Vietnamese footballer who is a left back, left midfielder for Thanh Hoa FC. Thanh retired in 2019.
