= Trần Văn Vũ (footballer, born 1994) =

Vietnamese footballer

Personal information
- Full name: Trần Văn Vũ
- Date of birth: 15 April 1994 (age 32)
- Place of birth: Đồng Phú, Bình Phước, Vietnam
- Height: 1.72 m (5 ft 8 in)
- Position: Centre-back

Youth career
- 2008–2016: Khatoco Khánh Hòa

Senior career*
Years	Team	Apps	(Gls)
2017–2022	Khánh Hòa	29	(1)
- * Club domestic league appearances and goals as of 28 March 2018

Trần Văn Vũ (born 15 April 1994) is a Vietnamese footballer who plays as a centre-back for V.League 2 club Khánh Hòa.
