= Trịnh Duy Long =

Vietnamese footballer (born 1992)

Personal information
- Full name: Trịnh Duy Long
- Date of birth: January 22, 1992 (age 34)
- Place of birth: Phú Xuyên, Hanoi, Vietnam
- Height: 1.76 m (5 ft 9 in)
- Position: Forward

Youth career
- 2006–2012: Hà Nội

Senior career*
Years	Team	Apps	(Gls)
2013	Hà Nội	12	(0)
2014–2016	→ Sài Gòn (loan)	24	(8)
2017–2018	Hà Nội	5	(0)
2019	Hồng Lĩnh Hà Tĩnh	11	(0)
2020–2021	Quảng Nam	5	(1)
- * Club domestic league appearances and goals

Trịnh Duy Long (born 22 January 1992) is a Vietnamese footballer who plays as a forward.

== Honours ==
Sài Gòn

- V.League 2: 2015

Individual

- V.League 2 Golden Boot: 2015
