= Sầm Ngọc Đức =

Vietnamese footballer

Personal information
- Full name: Sầm Ngọc Đức
- Date of birth: 18 May 1992 (age 34)
- Place of birth: Quỳ Hợp, Nghệ An, Vietnam
- Height: 1.70 m (5 ft 7 in)
- Positions: Full-back; midfielder

Team information
- Current team: Đồng Nai City
- Number: 77

Youth career
- 2003–2008: VSH Academy
- 2009–2012: Hà Nội T&T

Senior career*
Years	Team	Apps	(Gls)
2013–2018	Hà Nội	67	(0)
2018–2022	Hồ Chí Minh City	76	(2)
2023	Công An Hà Nội	14	(0)
2023–2024	Hồ Chí Minh City (loan)	24	(0)
2024–	Đồng Nai City	32	(0)

International career^{‡}
2013–2015	Vietnam U23	15	(0)
2016–2017	Vietnam	1	(0)
- * Club domestic league appearances and goals as of 30 May 2026 ‡ National team caps and goals as of 13 June 2017

Sầm Ngọc Đức (born 18 May 1992) is a Vietnamese professional footballer who plays as a full-back or midfielder for V.League 1 club Đồng Nai City.

Sầm Ngọc Đức began his professional career with Hà Nội. He then played in the V.League 1 with Hồ Chí Minh City, before joining Công An Hà Nội in 2023. After 2023 season, he return to the Hồ Chí Minh City, but, this is a loan contract from Công An Hà Nội in a season.

== Honours ==
Hà Nội

- V.League 1: 2013, 2016
- Vietnamese Cup runner-up: 2015, 2016
- Vietnamese Super Cup runner-up: 2014, 2016, 2017

Hồ Chí Minh City

- V.League 1 runner-up: 2019
- Vietnamese Super Cup runner-up: 2020

Công An Hà Nội

- V.League 1: 2023

Trường Tươi Đồng Nai

- V.League 2: 2025–26
