= Mustapha Essuman =

Ghanaian football player

Personal information
- Date of birth: 28 November 1983 (age 42)
- Place of birth: Ghana
- Height: 6 ft 0 in (1.83 m)
- Position: Defender

Team information
- Current team: Ococias Kyoto AC
- Number: 5

Youth career
- Noble Arics F.C.
- 1999–2000: Ghana Academicals

Senior career*
Years	Team	Apps	(Gls)
2000–2005	Liberty Professionals F.C.		
2005–2010	Khánh Hòa F.C.	24	(8)
2010–2014	Cần Thơ F.C.		(12)
2015–2017	Accra Hearts of Oak S.C.	30	(1)
2017–2018	Buildcon Football Club	29	(5)
2017–2018	Nkana F.C.		
2019–	Ococias Kyoto AC		

International career
2003	Ghana	5	(0)
- * Club domestic league appearances and goals

Mustapha Essuman (born 28 November 1983) is a Ghanaian footballer who plays as a defender.

== Career ==
Essuman started his career with Noble Arics FC and played for the club 1995 the National Milo Amateur Colts tournament. He was Captain of Academicals and was promoted to the Senior team of Liberty Professionals F.C. and 2003 named as Captain of the club. In the spring 2005 left Ghana and signed for V.League side Khánh Hòa F.C. Essuman joined after five years in the V-League Cần Thơ F.C.

Essuman joined Accra Hearts Of Oak in 2016. Essuman was the most consistent performer for Accra Hearts of Oak in the 2016 Ghana Premier League where he started in 30 consecutive league matches. The midfielder played 32 out of his club's 34 matches for the season - he was rested for two FA Cup games. He scored the second goal, a beautiful long range strike from outside the box, in a 3–1 win over Bechem United, and he was instrumental in midfield, where he sets the tempo of the game for the Phobians, and has provided five assists from 30 games.

He has been the go-to-man for the two coaches of Accra Hearts of Oak. Essuman was very influential in coach Kenichi Yatsuhashi's set-up and he continued to remain a big figure under Portuguese trainer Sergio Traguil, who was sacked before the season ended.

Essuman scored one of the best goals ever scored at the Accra Sports Stadium in a Peace Cup match with Asante Kotoko in September, 2016.

The Phobians were on the verge of losing again to their arch-rivals, and were trailing 2–1, when Essuman met a headed clearance from a corner kick on the volley from 30 yards. He tailored the ball without it touching the ground into the top, top, top corner to help Hearts snatch a draw in the Peace Cup.

== International ==
Essuman is former member of the Senior national team.

== Personal life ==
As a child, he attended the Aggrey Memorial Secondary School.
