= Đặng Quang Huy =

Vietnamese footballer (born 1992)

Personal information
- Full name: Đặng Quang Huy
- Date of birth: 12 May 1992 (age 34)
- Place of birth: Lập Thạch, Vĩnh Phúc, Vietnam
- Height: 1.78 m (5 ft 10 in)
- Position: Midfielder

Youth career
- 2009–2013: Hà Nội ACB

Senior career*
Years	Team	Apps	(Gls)
2013–2015	Viettel	5	(0)
2015–2018	Hải Phòng	17	(0)
2015	→ XSKT Cần Thơ (loan)	12	(0)
2017	→ XSKT Cần Thơ (loan)	10	(0)
2018–2019	Hồ Chí Minh City	6	(0)
2020	Than Quảng Ninh	4	(0)
2021–2022	Hải Phòng	7	(0)

International career
2016–2017	Vietnam	1	(0)
- * Club domestic league appearances and goals as of 17 March 2018

Đặng Quang Huy (born 12 May 1992) is a Vietnamese footballer who plays as a midfielder for V.League 1 club Hải Phòng.

== Career ==
Đặng Quang Huy began his career at Viettel, and later joined Hải Phòng in 2015. He spent half of the 2015 season out on load with XSKT Cần Thơ, although he did play an important role in Hải Phòng's 2016 season.

== International career ==
After Quế Ngọc Hải suffered an injury in October 2016, Quang Huy was surprisingly selected as Ngọc Hải's back up in the Vietnam squad for the 2016 AFF Championship.

== Honours ==
Công An Nhân Dân

- V.League 2: 2022
