= Trần Bình Sự =

Vietnamese footballer (born 1947)

Personal information
- Date of birth: 1947 (age 78–79)
- Place of birth: Hà Nam, Vietnam

Senior career*
Years	Team	Apps	(Gls)
1969–1979	Hải Phòng		

Managerial career
- 1993: Vietnam national team
- * Club domestic league appearances and goals

Trần Bình Sự (born 1947) is a Vietnamese football manager and former player.

== Career ==
Trần spent his entire playing career with Vietnamese side Hải Phòng and managed the Vietnam national team after retiring from professional football.
