= Huỳnh Tấn Tài =

Vietnamese footballer (born 1994)

Personal information
- Full name: Huỳnh Tấn Tài
- Date of birth: 17 August 1994 (age 32)
- Place of birth: Tân An, Long An, Vietnam
- Height: 1.70 m (5 ft 7 in)
- Positions: Midfielder; defender

Team information
- Current team: Hồng Lĩnh Hà Tĩnh
- Number: 39

Youth career
- 2005–2012: Đồng Tâm Long An

Senior career*
Years	Team	Apps	(Gls)
2013–2019	Long An	137	(12)
2020–2022	Sài Gòn	43	(4)
2023–2024	Công An Hà Nội	5	(0)
2023	→ Hồ Chí Minh City (loan)	6	(0)
2024	→ Hoàng Anh Gia Lai (loan)	14	(0)
2024–	Hồng Lĩnh Hà Tĩnh	39	(0)

International career
2011–2012	Vietnam U19	8	(1)
2012–2014	Vietnam U21	4	(0)
2015–2017	Vietnam U23	6	(0)
- * Club domestic league appearances and goals as of 7 June 2026

Huỳnh Tấn Tài (born 17 August 1994) is a Vietnamese professional footballer who plays for V.League 1 club Hồng Lĩnh Hà Tĩnh.

== Career ==
On 12 June 2023, Tấn Tài signed for Ho Chi Minh City FC on loan until the end of the 2023 season.

In February 2024, Tấn Tài joined LPBank HAGL on a loan deal until the end of the season.

== Honours ==
Công An Hà Nội

- V.League 1: 2023

Vietnam U23

- Southeast Asian Games Bronze medal: 2015
