= Dugary Ndabashinze =

Burundian footballer (born 1989)

Personal information
- Full name: Dugary Ndabashinze
- Date of birth: October 8, 1989 (age 37)
- Place of birth: Bujumbura, Burundi
- Height: 1.82 m (5 ft 11 1/2 in)
- Position: Winger

Team information
- Current team: Sài Gòn
- Number: 8

Youth career
- –2006: Atlético Olympic

Senior career*
Years	Team	Apps	(Gls)
2006–2007	Atlético Olympic	18	(5)
2007–2008	Atletico de Conakry	5	(1)
2008–2012	Genk	53	(3)
2012–2013	Waasland-Beveren	8	(1)
2013–2015	Tubize	40	(5)
2015–2016	La Louvière	9	(1)
2017–2018	Becamex Bình Dương	23	(2)
2018	Sài Gòn	12	(1)

International career^{‡}
2006–2016	Burundi	19	(1)
- * Club domestic league appearances and goals as of June 13, 2018 ‡ National team caps and goals as of 23 July 2023

Dugary Ndabashinze (born 8 October 1989) is a Burundian footballer who plays as a midfielder for Sài Gòn.

== Club career ==
He began his career at Atlético Olympic Bujumbura

In 2007, he moved to Atletico de Conakry in Guinea

In January 2008 he moved to Genk in the Belgian First Division. On 16 November 2008, he scored his first league goal for Genk, netting the equalizer in the 71st minute against SV Roeselare.

In the summer of 2012, he moved to newly promoted Waasland-Beveren.

== Honours ==
Genk

- Belgian First Division: 2010–11
