= TDC Bình Dương FC =

Vietnamese football club

TDC Bình Dương Football Club
- Full name: TDC Bình Dương
- Founded: 2008; 17 years ago
- Dissolved: 2013; 12 years ago
- Ground: Gò Đậu Stadium; Thủ Dầu Một, Bình Dương, Vietnam
- Capacity: 18,250
Home colours	Away colours

TDC Bình Dương Football Club (Vietnamese: Câu lạc bộ bóng đá TDC Bình Dương) is a Vietnamese football club which is based in Thủ Dầu Một, Vietnam. The club won Vietnam Second Division in 2009 and got promoted to 2010 Vietnamese First Division. TDC Bình Dương is under control of Bình Dương Trade & Development Joint-Stock Company. The club squad is mainly composed of young players from V.League 1 club Becamex Bình Dương.

== Achievements ==
=== National competitions ===
Second League:

(gold) Winners : 2008

== Affiliated clubs ==
- (Vietnam) Becamex Bình Dương
