= Đỗ Văn Thuận =

Vietnamese footballer (born 1992)

Personal information
- Date of birth: 25 May 1992 (age 34)
- Place of birth: Phú Xuyên, Hanoi, Vietnam
- Height: 1.70 m (5 ft 7 in)
- Position: Midfielder

Team information
- Current team: Ninh Bình
- Number: 14

Youth career
- 2003–2011: Viettel

Senior career*
Years	Team	Apps	(Gls)
2012–2017	Sài Gòn	50	(4)
2018–2021	Hồ Chí Minh City	68	(4)
2022–2024	Quy Nhơn Bình Định	56	(2)
2024–	Ninh Bình	0	(0)
2025–2026	→ PVF-CAND	14	(0)

International career
2017–2018	Vietnam	1	(0)
- * Club domestic league appearances and goals as of 12 June 2026

Đỗ Văn Thuận (born 25 May 1992) is a Vietnamese professional footballer who plays as a midfielder for V.League 1 club Ninh Bình. He appeared once for the Vietnam national team in 2018.
