= Phạm Công Lộc =

Vietnamese footballer (born 1969)

Personal information
- Place of birth: Đồng Tháp, Vietnam
- Position: Defender

Senior career*
Years	Team	Apps	(Gls)
1988–1996	Đồng Tháp		
- * Club domestic league appearances and goals

Phạm Công Lộc (born 1969) is a Vietnamese football manager and former footballer.

== Early life ==
He retired from playing professional football at the age of 28 due to injury.

== Career ==
He was appointed manager of Vietnamese side Dong Thap FC in 2008.

== Style of play ==
He mainly operated as a defender.

== Personal life ==
He has been nicknamed "Lộc cá lóc".
