= Nguyễn Trung Đại Dương =

Nigerian footballer

Personal information
- Full name: Suleiman Oladoja Abdullahi
- Date of birth: 9 February 1986 (age 40)
- Place of birth: Lagos, Nigeria
- Height: 1.89 m (6 ft 2 in)
- Position: Forward

Senior career*
Years	Team	Apps	(Gls)
2008	Quân Khu 4		
2009	Vissai Ninh Bình		
2010	Navibank Sài Gòn		(2)
2011	An Giang		
2012	XSKT Đà Lạt Lâm Đồng		(7)
2013	Xuân Thành Sài Gòn	4	(2)
2013	Kiên Giang	13	(9)
2014	Becamex Bình Dương	20	(7)
2015–2018	Quảng Nam	52	(19)
2019	An Giang	3	(3)
2019–2020	Sanna Khánh Hòa BVN	12	(2)
2020	Becamex Bình Dương	14	(0)
2021	Hoàng Anh Gia Lai	5	(0)
2022	Công An Nhân Dân	16	(4)
2023	Luxury Hạ Long	?	(?)
- * Club domestic league appearances and goals as of 27 July 2023

Nguyễn Trung Đại Dương (né: Suleiman Oladoja Abdullah; born 9 February 1986) is a Nigerian former footballer who played as a forward.

== Honours ==
Quân Khu 4

- Vietnamese First Division: 2008

Vissai Ninh Bình

- Vietnamese First Division: 2009

Becamex Bình Dương

- V.League 1: 2014

Quảng Nam

- V.League 1: 2017
- Vietnamese Super Cup: 2017

Công An Nhân Dân

- V.League 2: 2022
