= Nguyễn Quốc Thiện Esele =

Nigerian footballer

Theophilus Esele Nguyễn Quốc Thiện Esele
Personal information
- Full name: Nguyễn Quốc Thiện Esele
- Birth name: Theophilus Esele
- Date of birth: 29 April 1984 (age 42)
- Place of birth: Lagos, Nigeria
- Height: 1.80 m (5 ft 11 in)
- Position: Goalkeeper

Senior career*
Years	Team	Apps	(Gls)
2005–2011	Hòa Phát Hà Nội	195	(0)
2012–2016	Becamex Bình Dương	44	(0)
2017	Hồ Chí Minh City	13	(0)
2018	Nam Định	12	(0)
- * Club domestic league appearances and goals as of 15 July 2018

Nguyễn Quốc Thiện Esele (born as Theophilus Esele on 29 April 1984) is a Nigerian former professional footballer who played as a goalkeeper, he played for V-league 1 clubs such as Hoa Phat Hanoi, Becamex Binh Duong, Ho Chi Minh City. He last played in Nam Dinh before retired in 2018.
