= Trương Việt Hoàng =

Vietnamese football manager (born 1975)

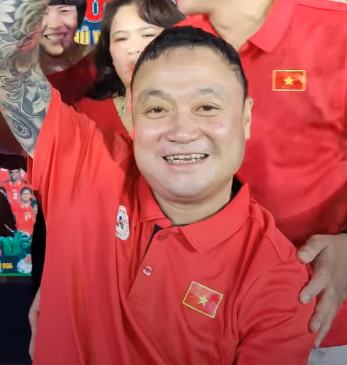
- Việt Hoàng in 2019

Personal information
- Date of birth: 9 December 1975 (age 50)
- Place of birth: Hanoi, Vietnam
- Height: 1.68 m (5 ft 6 in)
- Position: Striker

Team information
- Current team: Vietnam (assistant)

Youth career
- 1990–1996: Thể Công

Senior career*
Years	Team	Apps	(Gls)
1997–2005	Thể Công	152	(40)
2006–2007	Bình Định	11	(1)

International career
1998–2002	Vietnam	23	(11)

Managerial career
- 2013–2014: Sài Gòn
- 2014–2019: Hải Phòng
- 2019–2022: Viettel
- 2022: Hồ Chí Minh City
- 2023-2024: SHB Da Nang
- 2025-: Vietnam (assistant)
- * Club domestic league appearances and goals

Trương Việt Hoàng (born 9 December 1975) is a Vietnamese football manager and former football player, he is the assistant coach of the Vietnam national team.

During his playing days, Trương Việt Hoàng was a forward for The Cong-Viettel FC, Quy Nhon Binh Dinh FC, and the Vietnam national team.

== Career ==
Trương was born in Hanoi and developed through the Thể Công football club youth system.

He spent the majority of his entire playing career with Vietnamese side Thể Công and played for the Vietnam national team.

In 2016, Trương Việt Hoàng led Haiphong FC to a runner-up finish in the 2016 V.League 1, earning 50 points—equal to champions Hanoi FC T&T—but losing the title due to an inferior Goal difference.

In November 2019, he officially signed a contract with the Viettel Sports Center. Over nearly three years, he enjoyed successful seasons, marking historic milestones for The Cong-Viettel FC, including winning the 2020 V.League 1 championship in 2020 and finishing runners-up in the 2020 Vietnamese Cup.

At the end of August 2022, Trương Việt Hoàng was officially appointed head coach of Ho Chi Minh City FC. However, following a loss to Saigon FC in Round 17 of the 2022 V.League 1 on 30 September, he submitted his resignation, which was accepted by the club’s leadership. During his tenure of four matches, Ho Chi Minh City FC lost 4–3 to Haiphong, 1–0 to Nam Dinh, 2–0 to Saigon, and managed only a 1–1 draw against Hong Linh Ha Tinh FC.

On 29 August 2023, SHB Da Nang FC announced the appointment of Trương Việt Hoàng as head coach of the team.
