= Nguyễn Văn Việt (footballer, born 1989) =

Vietnamese footballer

Personal information
- Full name: Nguyễn Văn Việt
- Date of birth: 17 January 1989 (age 37)
- Place of birth: Quế Sơn, Quảng Nam, Vietnam
- Height: 1.78 m (5 ft 10 in)
- Positions: Defender; midfielder

Team information
- Current team: Khánh Hòa
- Number: 28

Youth career
- 2007–2013: Quảng Nam

Senior career*
Years	Team	Apps	(Gls)
2014–2015	Quảng Nam	15	(0)
2016–2017	Hồ Chí Minh City	5	(0)
2018–2020	Than Quảng Ninh	45	(0)
2021–2022	Hoàng Anh Gia Lai	7	(0)
2023–	Khánh Hòa	3	(0)
- * Club domestic league appearances and goals

Nguyễn Văn Việt (born 17 January 1989) is a Vietnamese footballer who plays as a defender for V.League 1 club Khánh Hòa.

== Career ==
In 2014, Nguyễn suffered an injury which kept him out for almost 3 years, considering retirement and working as a youth coach for Quang Nam.

For the 2018 season, he signed for Vietnamese top flight side Than Quang Ninh.
