= Víctor Ormazábal =

Argentine footballer

Personal information
- Full name: Víctor Manuel Ormazábal
- Date of birth: April 2, 1985 (age 41)
- Place of birth: Buenos Aires, Argentina
- Position: Midfielder

Youth career
- Boca Juniors

Senior career*
| Years | Team | Apps | (Gls) |
| 2003–2006 | Boca Juniors | 19 | (0) |
| 2006 | Maccabi Haifa | - | (-) |
| 2006–2008 | Pontevedra | - | (-) |
| 2008–2010 | Cádiz CF | 28 | (1) |
| 2010–2011 | Ceuta | 34 | (5) |
| 2012–2013 | Temperley | 1 | (0) |
| 2013–2014 | Almirante Brown | 6 | (0) |
| 2014–2015 | Erbil SC | | |
| 2015–2016 | Hanoi FC | 31 | (2) |
| 2017 | Ho Chi Minh City | 25 | (8) |
- * Club domestic league appearances and goals as of 19 November 2017

Víctor Ormazábal (born April 2, 1985, in Buenos Aires) is an Argentine footballer who most recently played for TP Hồ Chí Minh in Vietnam. He is currently without a club.

Ormazábal came through the youth team at Argentine giants Boca Juniors to make his debut on July 6, 2003, against Rosario Central. In 2004, he was part of the Boca Juniors squad that won the Copa Sudamericana title. Ormazábal left Boca in May 2006 after making only 25 appearances for the club in all competitions.

== Title ==
| Season | Club | Title |
|---|---|---|
| 2004 | Boca Juniors | Copa Sudamericana champion |
