= Hoàng Vissai =

Nigerian footballer

Personal information
- Full name: Hoàng Vissai
- Birth name: Dio Preye
- Date of birth: January 15, 1985 (age 41)
- Place of birth: Kaduna, Nigeria
- Height: 1.78 m (5 ft 10 in)
- Position: Centre-back

Senior career*
Years	Team	Apps	(Gls)
2006–2007	XSKT Đà Lạt Lâm Đồng	1	(0)
2007–2008	An Giang	1	(0)
2008–2009	Fico Tây Ninh	1	(0)
2009–2014	Vissai Ninh Bình	49	(2)
2014	Thanh Hóa	9	(0)
2015–2017	QNK Quảng Nam	49	(0)
2017–2019	XSKT Cần Thơ	35	(0)
2019–2020	Hải Phòng	14	(1)
2020	→ Quảng Nam (loan)	4	(0)
- * Club domestic league appearances and goals as of 2 October 2018

Hoàng Vissai (born as Dio Preye on 15 January 1985) is a Nigerian former footballer who played as a centre-back.

== Honours ==
Vietnamese Cup:

(gold) Winners : 2013

Vietnamese Super Cup:

(gold) Winners : 2014
