= Errol Stevens =

Jamaican footballer (born 1986)

Personal information
- Full name: Errol Anthony Stevens
- Date of birth: 9 May 1986 (age 40)
- Place of birth: Kingston, St. Andrew, Jamaica
- Height: 1.91 m (6 ft 3 in)
- Position: Forward

Senior career*
Years	Team	Apps	(Gls)
2005–2009	Harbour View	3	(1)
2009	→ Khimki (loan)	3	(0)
2010	Tivoli Gardens		
2010–2011	Portmore United		
2011	Arnett Gardens	9	(7)
2013–2014	Saraburi	33	(16)
2015–2019	Hải Phòng	89	(42)
2019	Dong A Thanh Hoa	5	(0)
2020–2021	Dunbeholden	1	(0)

International career
2011–2015	Jamaica	5	(0)
- * Club domestic league appearances and goals

Errol Anthony Stevens (born 9 May 1986) is a Jamaican former professional footballer who played as a forward.

== Club career ==
=== Harbour View ===
Stevens is a powerful forward, who also possesses decent pace and technique. Having previously played for his homeland side Harbour View, in July 2009 he decided to depart the island on trials, looking for the opportunity to impress in Europe.

=== FC Khimki ===
Stevens signed for Russian Premier League side FC Khimki on 20 August 2009 until the end of the season. Stevens made his debut on 22 August against CSKA Moscow. He returned to Harbour View at the end of the 2009 Russian Premier League season.

=== Arnett Gardens ===
Stevens moved to Arnett Gardens for the 2011–12 season. Where he led the team to the Claro Champions League, scoring six goals in five games and was voted MVP of the Competition.

=== Hải Phòng ===
In December 2014, Stevens signed with V.League 1 side Hải Phòng.

== International career ==
After he had already trained with the Reggae Boyz in 2007, Stevens made his international senior debut on 6 September 2011 versus Colombia in Fort Lauderdale, Florida. Although he impressed the technical staff, Jamaica lost the match 2–0.
