= Lê Văn Phú =

Ghanaian footballer (born 1983)

Issifu Ansah Lê Văn Phú
Personal information
- Date of birth: 13 June 1983 (age 43)
- Place of birth: Accra, Ghana
- Height: 1.75 m (5 ft 9 in)
- Position: Defender

Senior career*
Years	Team	Apps	(Gls)
2009–2012	Khatoco Khánh Hòa	51	(2)
2013–2018	Hải Phòng	105	(4)
2019–2020	Nam Định	20	(1)
- * Club domestic league appearances and goals as of 2 October 2018

Lê Văn Phú (born Issifu Ansah; 13 June 1983) is a Ghanaian footballer who plays as a defender for Nam Định.
