= Hoàng Văn Phúc =

Vietnamese footballer (born 1964)

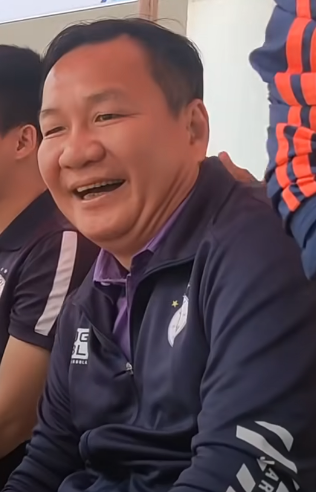

Personal information
- Date of birth: 20 December 1964 (age 61)
- Place of birth: Hanoi, North Vietnam
- Height: 1.73 m (5 ft 8 in)
- Position: Defender

Senior career*
Years	Team	Apps	(Gls)
1976–1983	Thể Công		
1983–1989	Quân khu 3		
1990–1996	Tổng Cục Đường Sắt		

Managerial career
- 2006–2008: Hà Nội ACB
- 2009–2011: Vietnam U16
- 2011–2013: Hà Nội
- 2012–2013: Vietnam U23
- 2013–2014: Vietnam
- 2014–2019: Quảng Nam
- 2019–2020: Sài Gòn
- 2021: Hà Nội (interim)
- 2021–2025: Hà Nội (technical director)
- 2025: Hà Nội (interim)
- 2025–2026: Vietnam Women (assistant)
- 2026–: Vietnam Women
- * Club domestic league appearances and goals

Hoàng Văn Phúc (born 20 December 1964) is a Vietnamese football manager and former player who is the head coach of the Vietnam women's national team.

== Managerial career ==
In 2013, Phúc was named the interim manager of the Vietnam national football team.

On 16 April 2026, Phúc was appointed to be the head coach of Vietnam women's national football team, replacing Mai Đức Chung, who led the team for 10 years.

== Honours ==
Quảng Nam

- V.League 1: 2017

Vietnam U16

- AFF U-16 Youth Championship: 2010
