= Danny van Bakel =

Dutch footballer (born 1983)

Danny Van Bakel
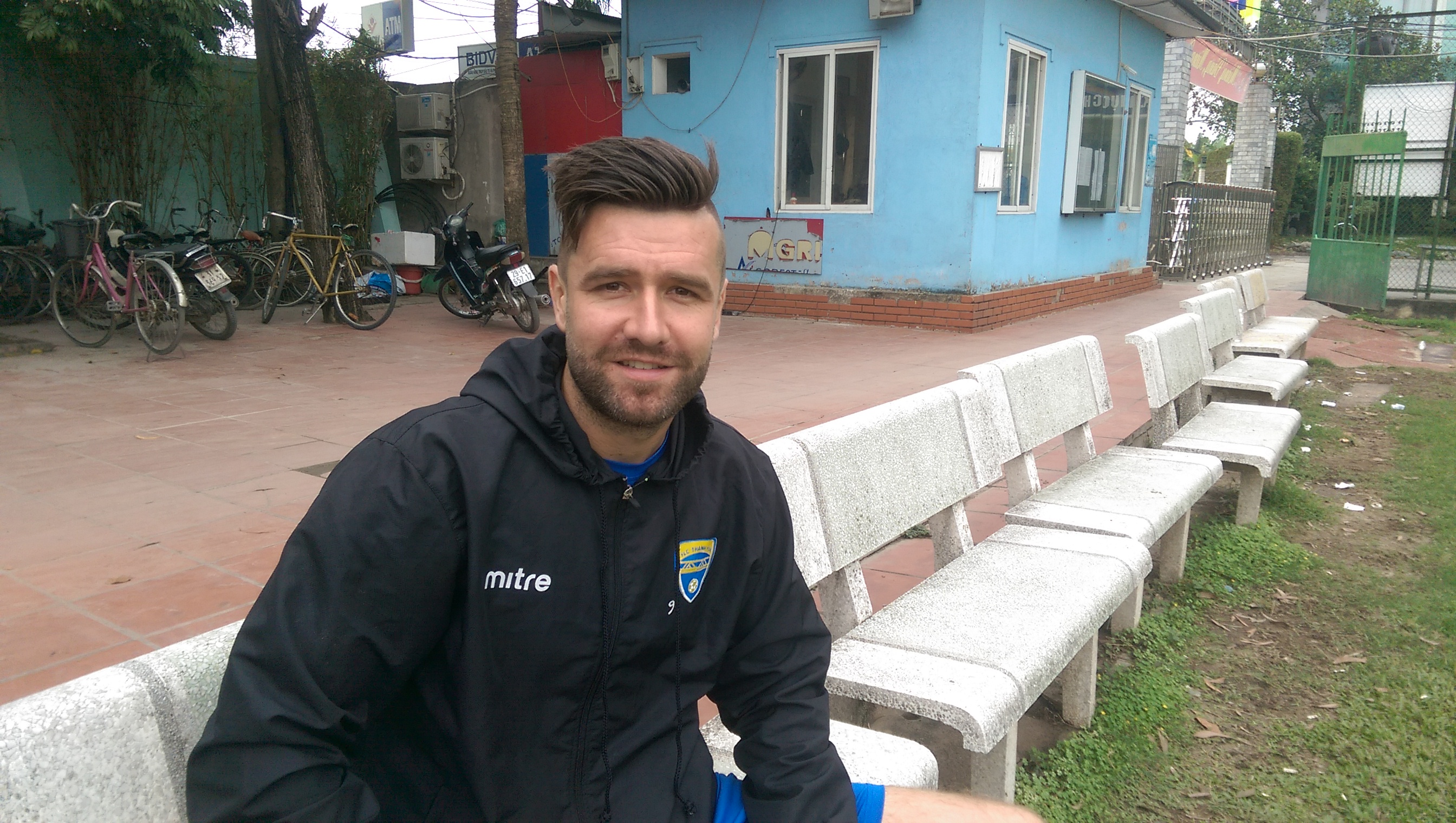
- Van Bakel in Vietnam

Personal information
- Date of birth: 8 December 1983 (age 42)
- Place of birth: Geldrop, Netherlands
- Height: 1.94 m (6 ft 4 in)
- Position: Centre-back

Youth career
- Braakhuizen
- Helmond Sport

Senior career*
Years	Team	Apps	(Gls)
2002–2005	Helmond Sport	19	(0)
2005–2008	Dijkse Boys	46	(2)
2008–2009	Cappellen	13	(0)
2009–2010	Dijkse Boys	12	(1)
2011	Lommel United	17	(2)
2011–2012	Bình Dương	31	(1)
2013	Đồng Nai	14	(1)
2014–2018	Thanh Hóa	84	(4)
Total		236	(11)
- * Club domestic league appearances and goals

Danny van Bakel (born 8 December 1983), also known as Nguyễn van Bakel, is a Dutch retired professional footballer who played as a centre-back.

== Career ==
=== Early years ===
Van Bakel kicked off his career with Helmond Sport in 2002 playing in Eerste Divisie. He made 19 appearances for the club before joining Dijkse Boys in 2005. In 2008, he switched club and country signing for amateur club Cappellen in Belgium. He played there for one year before he returned to Dijkse Boys. After the club was expelled from the league in November 2010, he went on to play for Lommel United, in the Belgian Second Division.

=== Vietnam ===
In 2011, Van Bakel signed a year and half contract with Vietnamese club Bình Dương though he first refused the offer. He played two seasons with the club making 28 appearances before joining Đồng Nai in 2013. The following year he was recruited by Thanh Hóa. In Thanh Hóa, he became a fan favourite and is known as Dutch David Beckham.

== Personal life ==
Van Bakel is married to DJ Myno whose real name is Nguyễn Thị Ngọc My. On 18 September 2014, she gave birth to a baby boy whom they have named David van Bakel. In October 2015 Van Bakel expressed his desire to acquire Vietnamese citizenship and to represent the Vietnamese team internationally. In early January 2016, he was granted Vietnamese citizenship and adopted the name, Nguyễn van Bakel.
