= Saigon FC =

Vietnamese football club

Saigon
- Full name: Saigon Football Club; Câu lạc bộ Bóng đá Sài Gòn
- Founded: 2011; 15 years ago (as Hà Nội FC)
- Dissolved: February 14, 2023; 3 years ago
- Ground: Thống Nhất Stadium
- Capacity: 14,400

Saigon Football Club (Vietnamese: Câu lạc bộ Bóng đá Sài Gòn) was a Vietnamese professional football club administered by Saigon Football Development Joint Stock Company. Following the relegation from the 2022 V.League 1 and problems related to the club's ownership, the team was dissolved.

The club's formation was set as a result of the reserves team of Hanoi T&T relocating to Ho Chi Minh City in the south of Vietnam and renaming in 2016 to Saigon FC.

== History ==
The team was established in 2008 as the reserves side of Thể Công. After one season, after Thể Công senior team sold their V-League participation slot to Thanh Hóa, the reserves side became the main team and was renamed Viettel Football Club.

At the end of the 2010 season, T&T Sports Joint Stock Company acquired the team and renamed it Hanoi Football Club.

On 31 March 2016, after winning the 2015 V.League 2 and promoted to Vietnamese top-flight, Hanoi Football Club moved its base to Ho Chi Minh City and changed its name to Saigon Football Club, registering Thống Nhất Stadium as its home ground from the 2016 season.

In February 2020, Saigon announced a cooperation agreement with Japanese club FC Tokyo, which includes plans for a joint football academy being started in Vietnam.

After relegating from the 2022 V.League 1, the team faced big financial difficulties. The team owner put the club on sale. Lâm Đồng offered to purchase Saigon's spot in the 2023 V.League 2 but the deal failed. The team officially ceased operations on 14 February 2023.

== Kit manufacturers and shirt sponsors ==
| Period | Kit manufacturer | Shirt sponsor |
|---|---|---|
| 2018 | Kami | |
| 2019 | Fraser Sport | |
| 2020 | Zaicro | Ben Thanh Holdings; Van Lang University; Him Lam Group |
| 2021 | Made by club | SCB; Eneos |
| 2022 | Kelme | SCB (until round 11); Novaland (round 12 onwards); Japan Airlines |

== Domestic record ==
| Season | Pld | Won | Draw | Lost | GF | GA | GD | PTS | Position | Notes |
|---|---|---|---|---|---|---|---|---|---|---|
| 2016 V.League 1 | 26 | 9 | 9 | 8 | 34 | 32 | +2 | 36 | 7th | |
| 2017 V.League 1 | 26 | 11 | 10 | 5 | 40 | 29 | +11 | 43 | 5th | |
| 2018 V.League 1 | 26 | 9 | 4 | 13 | 36 | 40 | −4 | 31 | 8th | |
| 2019 V.League 1 | 26 | 10 | 6 | 10 | 37 | 40 | −3 | 36 | 5th | |
| 2020 V.League 1 | 20 | 9 | 7 | 4 | 30 | 19 | +11 | 34 | 3rd | |
| 2021 V.League 1 | 12 | 4 | 1 | 7 | 6 | 14 | –8 | 13 | 13th | |
| 2022 V.League 1 | 24 | 5 | 7 | 12 | 26 | 42 | -16 | 22 | 13th | Relegation to 2023 V.League 2 |

== Continental record ==
| Season | Competition | Round | Club | Home | Away | Aggregate |
|---|---|---|---|---|---|---|
| 2021 | AFC Cup | Group H | Cancelled | | | |

== Stadium ==
Saigon FC has played at Thống Nhất Stadium in Hòa Hưng since the club was founded in 2016. In 2020, the club purchased the Thanh Long Sports Center in District 8, Ho Chi Minh City. The proposed Saigon Football Academy would jointly operate with FC Tokyo, based out of this location.

== Former players ==
=== Notable players ===
Had international caps for their respective countries. Players whose name is listed in bold represented their countries while playing for Saigon FC.

=== Domestic ===
- (Vietnam) Cao Văn Triền
- (Vietnam) Đỗ Hùng Dũng
- (Vietnam) Đỗ Văn Thuận
- (Vietnam) Huỳnh Tấn Tài
- (Vietnam) Lê Hoàng Thiên
- (Vietnam) Lê Quốc Phương
- (Vietnam) Ngân Văn Đại
- (Vietnam) Nguyễn Hữu Sơn
- (Vietnam) Nguyễn Ngọc Duy
- (Vietnam) Nguyễn Quang Hải
- (Vietnam) Nguyễn Quốc Long
- (Vietnam) Nguyễn Tiến Duy
- (Vietnam) Nguyễn Việt Phong
- (Vietnam) Phạm Văn Luân
- (Vietnam) Phạm Văn Phong
- (Vietnam) Trần Đình Trọng
- (Vietnam) Trịnh Duy Long
- (Vietnam) Võ Hoàng Quảng

=== Foreign ===
- (Argentina) Gastón Merlo
- (Belgium) Marvin Ogunjimi
- (Burundi) Dugary Ndabashinze
- (Brazil) Geovane Magno
- (Brazil) Pedro Paulo
- (Ghana) Jonathan Quartey
- (Haiti) **Jean-Eudes Maurice**
- (Jamaica) Kavin Bryan
- (Japan) Daisuke Matsui
- (Mauritania) Dominique Da Sylva
- (Uganda) **Geoffrey Kizito**
- (Uganda) Andrew Mwesigwa

== Management and staff ==
=== Final staff ===
| Position | Staff |
|---|---|
| Manager | (Vietnam) Phùng Thanh Phương |
| Assistant coaches | (Vietnam) Trần Trung Kiên (Vietnam) Trịnh Văn Hậu (Vietnam) Hoàng Hùng |
| Goalkeeping coach | (Vietnam) Nguyễn Hoàng Duy |
| Translator | (Vietnam) Nguyễn Đường Hiếu |
| Physiotherapist | (Japan) Shoichi Masuda |
| Kitman | (Vietnam) Lư Tấn Hậu |
| President | (Vietnam) Trần Hòa Bình |
| Technical director | (Vietnam) Le Huynh Duc |

== Managerial history ==
| Dates | Name | Notes |
|---|---|---|
| 2016–2018 | (Vietnam) Nguyễn Đức Thắng | |
| 2018 | (Vietnam) Phan Văn Tài Em | |
| 2018–2019 | (Vietnam) Nguyễn Thành Công | |
| 2019–2020 | (Vietnam) Hoàng Văn Phúc | |
| 2020–2021 | (Vietnam) Vũ Tiến Thành | |
| 2021 | (Japan) Masahiro Shimoda | |
| 2021–2022 | (Vietnam) Phùng Thanh Phương | |
