= Trần Văn Vũ (footballer, born 1992) =

Vietnamese footballer

Personal information
- Full name: Trần Văn Vũ
- Date of birth: 7 January 1992 (age 34)
- Place of birth: Diên Khánh, Khánh Hòa, Vietnam
- Height: 1.72 m (5 ft 8 in)
- Position: Centre-back

Youth career
- 2006–2014: Khatoco Khánh Hòa

Senior career*
Years	Team	Apps	(Gls)
2015–2022	Khánh Hòa	77	(2)
- * Club domestic league appearances and goals as of 28 March 2018

Trần Văn Vũ (born 7 January 1992) is a Vietnamese footballer who plays as a centre-back for V.League 2 club Khánh Hòa.
