= Uche Iheruome =

Nigerian footballer

Personal information
- Full name: Uche Iheruome
- Date of birth: April 14, 1987 (age 39)
- Place of birth: Lagos, Nigeria
- Height: 1.88 m (6 ft 2 in)
- Position: Striker

Youth career
- Julius Berger FC

Senior career*
Years	Team	Apps	(Gls)
2005–2010	Pakhtakor	41	(38)
2008	→ Mes Kerman (loan)	12	(4)
2008	→ Shurtan Guzar (loan)	12	(5)
2009	→ FK Ventspils (loan)	4	(1)
2010	→ Shahin Bushehr (loan)	6	(0)
2011	Cần Thơ	22	(7)
2012	SHB Đà Nẵng	14	(14)
2013–2014	An Giang	11	(10)
2014	Than Quảng Ninh	24	(18)
2014–2016	Sanna Khánh Hòa	57	(42)
2017–2018	Thanh Hóa	22	(12)
- * Club domestic league appearances and goals

Uche Iheruome (born April 14, 1987 in Lagos) is a Nigerian professional footballer who last played for Thanh Hóa.
