= Vietnamese National U-21 Football Championship =

- Founded: 1997
- Country: Việt Nam
- Confederation: AFC
- Current champions: PVF (1st title) (2025)
- Most championships: Hà Nội (6 titles)
- Website: Official website
- Current: 2025 season

The Vietnamese National U-21 Football Championship, known also as the Thanh Niên National U-21 Football Championship (Vietnamese: Giải bóng đá U-21 Quốc gia Cúp Báo Thanh Niên) for sponsorship reasons, is the national championship of association football for male players under the age of 21 organized by the Vietnam Football Federation (VFF). The competition was founded in 1997 and is held annually since its creation. It is considered as an important tournament for young players before they move to professional level.

Hoàng Anh Gia Lai is the current defending champion, having defeated PVF in the 2024 final to win their second title.

== Results ==
The tournament is divided in two phases. First, a qualification round which consists all the participating teams. The teams will be divided into several groups and will play in a round-robin format to determine 12 teams (8 teams from 1997 to 2022) that qualify for the final tournament.

Year	Host	Final			Semi-finalists
Year	Host	Champion	Score	Runner-up	Semi-finalists
1997	Hà Nội	Thể Công	2–1	Hồ Chí Minh City	Bình Dương; Đồng Tháp
1998	Hồ Chí Minh City	Thể Công	1–0	Đồng Tháp	Hồ Chí Minh City
1999	Đà Nẵng	Thể Công	1–0	Đà Nẵng	Gạch Đồng Tâm Long An
2000	Hồ Chí Minh City	Sông Lam Nghệ An	3–2	Gạch Đồng Tâm Long An	Công An Hồ Chí Minh City
2001	Đà Nẵng	Sông Lam Nghệ An	1–0	Đà Nẵng	Nam Định
2002	Đà Nẵng	Sông Lam Nghệ An	1–0	Hồ Chí Minh City	Đà Nẵng
2003	An Giang	Đà Nẵng	1–0	Sông Lam Nghệ An	An Giang; Đồng Tháp
2004	Gia Lai	Sông Đà Nam Định	1–0	Khánh Hòa	Pjico Sông Lam Nghệ An; Delta Đồng Tháp
2005	Bình Định	Hoa Lâm Bình Định	1–0	LG Hà Nội ACB	Thể Công; Sông Đà Nam Định
2006	Đà Nẵng	Thép Pomina Tiền Giang	3–2	Hoàng Anh Gia Lai	Bình Định; Mikado Nam Định
2007	Khánh Hòa	Khatoco Khánh Hòa	2–1	Sông Lam Nghệ An	Bình Định; An Giang
2008	Bình Định	Đà Nẵng	1–0	Hồ Chí Minh City	Khánh Hòa; An Đô An Giang
2009	Bình Dương	SHB Đà Nẵng	0–0 (4–3 p.)	Becamex Bình Dương	T&T Hà Nội; Than Quảng Ninh
2010	Gia Lai	Đồng Nai Berjaya	3–3 (4–3 p.)	Sông Lam Nghệ An	Hoàng Anh Gia Lai; SQC Bình Định
2011	Bình Dương	Nam Định	1–1 (5–4 p.)	Becamex Bình Dương	Đồng Nai; Sông Lam Nghệ An
2012	Ninh Thuận	Sông Lam Nghệ An	2–0	Ninh Thuận	Khatoco Khánh Hòa; Than Quảng Ninh
2013	Hải Phòng	Hà Nội T&T	2–0	Vĩnh Long	Sông Lam Nghệ An; Vicem Hải Phòng
2014	Cần Thơ	Sông Lam Nghệ An	1–0	Hà Nội T&T	Đồng Tháp; SHB Đà Nẵng
2015	Hồ Chí Minh City	Hà Nội T&T	2–1	An Giang	Hồ Chí Minh City; Bình Định
2016	Quảng Ninh	Hà Nội T&T	2–1	Sanna Khánh Hòa BVN	Hoàng Anh Gia Lai; Than Quảng Ninh
2017	Bình Dương	Hoàng Anh Gia Lai	3–0	Viettel	Sông Lam Nghệ An; Becamex Bình Dương
2018	Huế	Hà Nội	1–0	Becamex Bình Dương	Viettel; Hoàng Anh Gia Lai
2019	Gia Lai	Hà Nội	1–0	Phố Hiến	Đồng Tháp; Hồng Lĩnh Hà Tĩnh
2020	Khánh Hòa	Viettel	1–0	Sông Lam Nghệ An	Đồng Tháp; Nam Định
2021	Hưng Yên	Nutifood	1–0	Hà Nội	Phố Hiến; Hoàng Anh Gia Lai
2022	Nghệ An; Hà Tĩnh	Hà Nội	1–0	Becamex Bình Dương	Viettel; Đông Á Thanh Hóa
2023	Nghệ An; Thanh Hóa	PVF-CAND	1–1 (5–4 p.)	Sông Lam Nghệ An	Hà Nội; SHB Đà Nẵng
2024	Hà Nội; Hưng Yên	LPBank Hoàng Anh Gia Lai	0–0 (4–2 p.)	PVF	Đông Á Thanh Hóa; Quảng Nam
2025	Hồ Chí Minh City	PVF	1–0	Thể Công-Viettel	Hà Nội; Hồ Chí Minh City
2026	Hưng Yên		–		

== Top-performing clubs ==
Clubs	Champion	Runner-up
Hà Nội FC	6 (2013, 2015, 2016, 2018, 2019, 2022)	2 (2014, 2021)
Sông Lam Nghệ An	5 (2000, 2001, 2002, 2012, 2014)	5 (2003, 2007, 2010, 2020, 2023)
Thể Công-Viettel	4 (1997, 1998, 1999, 2020)	2 (2017, 2025)
SHB Đà Nẵng	3 (2003, 2008, 2009)	1 (1999, 2001)
Hoàng Anh Gia Lai	2 (2017, 2024)	1 (2006)
Nam Định	2 (2004, 2011)	-
Khánh Hòa (1976)	1 (2007)	1 (2004)
PVF-CAND	1 (2023)	1 (2019)
PVF	1 (2025)	1 (2024)
Bình Định	1 (2005)	-
Tiền Giang	1 (2006)	-
Đồng Nai	1 (2010)	-
Nutifood	1 (2021)	-
Becamex Bình Dương	-	4 (2009, 2011, 2018, 2022)
Hồ Chí Minh City Football Federation	-	3 (1997, 2002, 2008)

== Awards ==
Year	Best player		Top scorer		Best goalkeeper	
Year	Player	Club	Player	Club	Player	Club
2003	Phan Thanh Hoàn	Sông Lam Nghệ An	Lê Công Vinh	Sông Lam Nghệ An	Nguyễn Đức Nam	Đà Nẵng
2004	Trần Đức Dương	Sông Đà Nam Định	Phan Thanh Bình	Delta Đồng Tháp	Phạm Ngọc Tú	Sông Đà Nam Định
2005	Phạm Thành Lương	LG Hà Nội ACB	Trương Hoàng Vũ; Phạm Thanh Nguyên	Bình Định; Sông Đà Nam Định	Nguyễn Minh Phong	LG Hà Nội ACB
2006	Nguyễn Thành Long Giang	Thép Pomina Tiền Giang	Nguyễn Tăng Tuấn	Hoàng Anh Gia Lai	Hoàng Công Vương	Hoàng Anh Gia Lai
2007	Nguyễn Đình Hiệp	Sông Lam Nghệ An	Nguyễn Quang Hải	Khatoco Khánh Hòa	Phan Văn Thạch	Khatoco Khánh Hòa
2008	Huỳnh Phúc Hiệp	SHB Đà Nẵng	Nguyễn Đức Thiện	Hồ Chí Minh City	Lê Văn Hưng	Khatoco Khánh Hòa
2009	Phạm Nguyên Sa	SHB Đà Nẵng	Trương Công Thảo	SHB Đà Nẵng	Nguyễn Xuân Nam	SHB Đà Nẵng
2010	Nguyễn Tuấn Anh	Đồng Nai Berjaya	Phạm Hữu Phát; Lê Đức Tài; Nguyễn Đình Bảo	Đồng Nai Berjaya; Hoàng Anh Gia Lai; Sông Lam Nghệ An	Nguyễn Thanh Diệp	Đồng Nai Berjaya
2011	Lâm Anh Quang	Nam Định	Trịnh Hoài Nam	Becamex Bình Dương	Nguyễn Tiến Tạo	Nam Định
2012	Vũ Quang Nam	Sông Lam Nghệ An	Vũ Quang Nam	Sông Lam Nghệ An	Nguyễn Thanh Diệp	Ninh Thuận
2013	Trần Đình Trường	Vĩnh Long	Trần Đình Trường	Vĩnh Long	Nguyễn Văn Công	Hà Nội T&T
2014	Hồ Phúc Tịnh	Sông Lam Nghệ An	Hồ Phúc Tịnh	Sông Lam Nghệ An	Nguyễn Văn Công	Hà Nội T&T
2015	Phạm Văn Thành	Hà Nội T&T	Phạm Văn Thành	Hà Nội T&T	Đặng Ngọc Tuấn	An Giang
2016	Nguyễn Như Tuấn	Hà Nội T&T	Phạm Tuấn Hải; Lâm Ti Phông	Hà Nội T&T; Sanna Khánh Hòa	Hoàng Văn Hưng	Than Quảng Ninh
2017	Lê Văn Sơn	Hoàng Anh Gia Lai	Lê Văn Sơn; Phan Văn Đức	Hoàng Anh Gia Lai; Sông Lam Nghệ An	Rmah Sươ	Hoàng Anh Gia Lai
2018	Nguyễn Thành Chung	Hà Nội	Phan Thanh Hậu	Hoàng Anh Gia Lai	Đỗ Sỹ Huy	Hà Nội
2019	Trần Văn Đạt	Hà Nội	Trần Danh Trung	Viettel	Quan Văn Chuẩn	Hà Nội
2020	Nguyễn Hữu Thắng	Viettel	Nhâm Mạnh Dũng	Viettel	Phạm Mạnh Cường	Viettel
2021	Nguyễn Quốc Việt	Nutifood	Nguyễn Quốc Việt	Nutifood	Nguyễn Duy Dũng	Hà Nội
2022	Nguyễn Văn Trường	Hà Nội	Bùi Vĩ Hào	Becamex Bình Dương	Phan Văn Đông Điền	Becamex Bình Dương
2023	Thái Bá Đạt	PVF-CAND	Nguyễn Gia Bảo; Nguyễn Ngọc Tú	PVF-CAND; Viettel	Nguyễn Quang Trường	PVF-CAND
2024	Nguyễn Đức Việt	LPBank Hoàng Anh Gia Lai	Nguyễn Ngọc Mỹ	Đông Á Thanh Hóa	Trần Trung Kiên	LPBank Hoàng Anh Gia Lai
2025	Nguyễn Lê Phát	PVF	Nguyễn Minh Tâm	Hoàng Anh Gia Lai	Nguyễn Quang Trường	PVF
