= 2019 Vietnamese Cup =

Tournament details
- Country: Vietnam
- Teams: 26

Final positions
- Champions: Hà Nội (1st title)
- Runners-up: Quảng Nam (1)

Tournament statistics
- Matches played: 25
- Goals scored: 76 (3.04 per match)
- Top goal scorer(s): Nguyễn Thiện Chí; Phù Trung Phong; Lê Đức Tài; Trịnh Quang Vinh (2 goals each)

The 2019 Vietnamese National Cup (known as the Bamboo Airways National Cup for sponsorship reasons), was the 27th edition of the Vietnamese National Cup, the football knockout tournament of Vietnam organized by the Vietnam Football Federation.

== First round ==
29 March 2019	Đồng Tháp (2)	3 – 4	XM Fico Tây Ninh (2)	Đồng Tháp
	Nguyễn Thiện Chí 2', 90'; Lê Thành Phát 86'		Lê Đức Tài 42', 85'; Lương Quốc Thắng 80'; Hiệp Huỳnh Phúc 90+3'	Stadium: Đồng Tháp; Attendance: 1,500

29 March 2019	Sanna Khánh Hòa BVN (1)	0 – 2	An Giang (2)	Khánh Hòa
			Phạm Văn Lộc 16'; Nguyễn Trung Đại Dương 85'	Stadium: 19/8 Nha Trang; Attendance: 500

29 March 2019	Sài Gòn (1)	6 – 1	Bình Định (2)	TP Hồ Chí Minh
	Nguyễn Hữu Sơn 33'; Nguyễn Ngọc Duy 41'; Lê Quốc Phương 44'; Trịnh Quang Vinh 71', 76'; Nguyễn Văn Ngọ 84'		Nguyễn Văn Văn 80'	Stadium: Thống Nhất; Attendance: 1,000

30 March 2019	Bình Phước (2)	2 – 2 (8 - 7 p)	XSKT Cần Thơ (2)	Bình Phước
	Phù Trung Phong 59', 85'		Huỳnh Đức Thịnh 56'; Lâm Hải Đăng 74'	Stadium: Bình Phước; Attendance: 500
	Penalties
	Huỳnh Văn Ly (penalty scored); Đào Tấn Lộc (penalty scored); Dương Văn Trung (penalty scored); Đặng Trần Hoàng Nhựt (penalty scored); Lâm Thuận (penalty scored); Lê Hữu Thắng (penalty scored); Lê Quyền Huy Tín (penalty scored); Điểu Giang (penalty scored)		(penalty scored) Nguyễn Thanh Hiền; (penalty scored) Nguyễn Văn Ngọc; (penalty scored) Trần Đình Tiến; (penalty scored) Nguyễn Văn Sơn; (penalty scored) Trần Thanh Long; (penalty scored) Nguyễn Văn Mạnh; (penalty scored) Trần Tiến Anh; (penalty missed) Huỳnh Đức Thịnh

30 March 2019	Long An (2)	1 – 1 (3 - 5 p)	Dược Nam Hà Nam Định (1)	Long An
	Hà Vũ Em 3'		Nguyễn Hữu Định 60'	Stadium: Long An; Attendance: 2,000

30 March 2019	Phù Đổng (2)	0 – 1	Quảng Nam (1)	Hà Nội
			Nguyễn Huy Hùng 61'	Stadium: Mỹ Đình; Attendance: 200

31 March 2019	Đắk Lắk (2)	0 – 2	Hoàng Anh Gia Lai (1)	Đắk Lắk
16:00			Nguyễn Phong Hồng Duy 27'; Trần Minh Vương 53'	Stadium: Buôn Ma Thuột Stadium; Referee: Đặng Đức Toàn

31 March 2019	Huế (2)	0 – 1	Hồng Lĩnh Hà Tĩnh (2)	Huế
17:00			Lê Văn Nam 41'	Stadium: Tự Do; Attendance: 2000

31 March 2019	SHB Đà Nẵng (1)	0 – 1	Hải Phòng (1)	Da Nang
19:00			Andre Fagan 82'	Stadium: Hòa Xuân; Attendance: 2500

31 March 2019	CLB Phố Hiến (2)	1 – 2	Ho Chi Minh City FC (1)

== Second round ==
28 June 2019	Dược Nam Hà Nam Định (1)	3 – 0	Bình Phước (2)	Nam Định
	Vũ Đức Nam 43'; Mai Xuân Quyết 79', 84'			Stadium: Thiên Trường; Attendance: 5,000

28 June 2019	Than Quảng Ninh (1)	2 – 2 (4 - 5 p)	Hoàng Anh Gia Lai (1)	Quảng Ninh
	Nguyễn Hải Huy 17'; Rod Dyachenko 84' (pen.)		Nguyễn Văn Toàn 31'; Chevaughn Walsh 90+5'	Stadium: Cửa Ông; Attendance: 4,000

28 June 2019	Viettel (1)	3 – 3 (3 - 4 p)	TP Hồ Chí Minh (1)	Hà Nội
	Nguyễn Trọng Hoàng 35'; Bruno Cantanhede 52'; Nguyễn Việt Phong 71'		Huỳnh Kesley Alves 14', 88' (pen.); Ismahil Akinade 64'	Stadium: Hàng Đẫy; Attendance: 2,000
	Penalties
	Vũ Minh Tuấn (penalty scored); Quế Ngọc Hải (penalty scored); Trần Ngọc Sơn (penalty missed); Nguyễn Đức Chiến (penalty missed); Nguyễn Việt Phong (penalty scored)		(penalty scored) Trần Thanh Bình; (penalty missed) Ismahil Akinade; (penalty scored) Đỗ Văn Thuận; (penalty scored) Ngô Tùng Quốc; (penalty scored) Huỳnh Kesley Alves

29 June 2019	Thanh Hóa (1)	1 – 2	Hải Phòng (1)	Thanh Hóa
	Gramoz Kurtaj 62'		Jeremie Lynch 53'; Nguyễn Hữu Phúc 59'	Stadium: Thanh Hóa

29 June 2019	Sông Lam Nghệ An (1)	2 – 2 (8 - 9 p)	Quảng Nam (1)	Nghệ An
	Hồ Tuấn Tài 43'; Damir Memović 47'		Hà Minh Tuấn 71', 79'	Stadium: Vinh; Attendance: 5.000
	Penalties
	Hồ Khắc Ngọc (penalty scored); Trần Nguyên Mạnh (penalty scored); Michael Olaha (penalty scored); Hồ Tuấn Tài (penalty missed); Nguyễn Quang Tình (penalty scored); Hoàng Văn Khánh (penalty missed); Võ Ngọc Toàn (penalty scored); Phạm Thế Nhật (penalty scored); Trần Đình Đồng (penalty scored); Lê Thế Cường (penalty scored); Damir Memovic (penalty missed)		(penalty scored) Đinh Thanh Trung; (penalty missed) Claudecir; (penalty scored) Nguyễn H. Quốc Chí; (penalty scored) Ngô Quang Huy; (penalty scored) Nguyễn Hồng Sơn; (penalty missed) Lucas Rocha; (penalty scored) Đinh Viết Tú; (penalty scored) Đào Duy Khánh; (penalty scored) Trịnh Văn Hà; (penalty scored) Hà Minh Tuấn; (penalty scored) Trần Đình Minh Hoàng

29 June 2019	Sài Gòn (1)	4 – 2	An Giang (2)	TP Hồ Chí Minh
	Trần Văn Bửu 31'; Lê Quốc Phương 45+1'; Nguyễn Đình Bảo 88', 90'			Stadium: Thống Nhất

30 June 2019	Becamex Bình Dương (1)	5 – 0	XM Fico Tây Ninh (2)	Bình Dương
	Nguyễn Tiến Linh 43', 87'; Hồ Sỹ Giáp 61'; Đoàn Tuấn Cảnh 76'; Hồ Tấn Tài 79'			Stadium: Gò Đậu

30 June 2019	Hà Nội (1)	3 – 1	Hồng Lĩnh Hà Tĩnh (2)	Hà Nội
	Nguyễn Văn Dũng 19'; Phạm Đức Huy 51', 86'		Phạm Tuấn Hải 90+2'	Stadium: Hàng Đẫy

== Quarter-Final round ==
3 July 2019	Quảng Nam (1)	0 – 0 (5–4 p)	Hoàng Anh Gia Lai (1)	Quảng Nam
				Stadium: Tam Kỳ
	Penalties
	Đinh Thanh Trung (penalty scored); Nguyễn Hoàng Quốc Chí (penalty scored); Ngô Quang Huy (penalty scored); Nguyễn Như Tuấn (penalty scored); Nguyễn Hồng Sơn (penalty scored)		(penalty scored) Kim Bong-jin; (penalty scored) Nguyễn Kiên Quyết; (penalty scored) Trần Thanh Sơn; (penalty scored) Vũ Văn Thanh; (penalty missed) Lê Văn Sơn

3 July 2019	Hải Phòng (1)	0 – 0 (3–5 p)	Hồ Chí Minh City (1)	Hải Phòng
				Stadium: Lạch Tray
	Penalties
	Joseph Mpande (penalty scored); Andre Fagan (penalty missed); Hoàng Vissai (penalty scored); Đậu Thanh Phong (penalty scored)		(penalty scored) Đỗ Văn Thuận; (penalty scored) Lê Hoàng Thiên; (penalty scored) Trần Thanh Bình; (penalty scored) Ngô Tùng Quốc; (penalty scored) Huỳnh Kesley Alves

4 July 2019	Nam Định (1)	3 – 4	Hà Nội (1)	Nam Định
	Lê Sỹ Minh 3'; Lâm Anh Quang 54'; Gustavo A. Dos Santos 90+2'		Nguyễn Văn Quyết 41', 58'; Pape Omar Faye 45+2'; Nguyễn Quang Hải 63'	Stadium: Thiên Trường

4 July 2019	Sài Gòn (1)	0 – 1	Becamex Bình Dương (1)	TP Hồ Chí Minh
			Pedro Agusto 77'	Stadium: Thống Nhất

== Semi-final round ==
27 October 2019	Becamex Bình Dương (1)	1 – 2	Quảng Nam (1)	Bình Dương
17:00	Wander Luiz 45'		Hà Minh Tuấn 77'; Rodrigo 84'	Stadium: Gò Đậu; Attendance: 2500; Referee: Ngô Duy Lân

27 October 2019	Hà Nội (1)	3 – 0	Ho Chi Minh City (1)	Hà Nội
19:00	Pape Omar Faye 35'; Ngân Văn Đại 46'; Nguyễn Văn Quyết 75'			Stadium: Hàng Đẫy; Attendance: 5000; Referee: Nguyễn Đình Thái

== Final round ==
31 October 2019	Quảng Nam (1)	1 – 2	Hà Nội (1)	Quảng Nam
17:00				Stadium: Tam Kỳ

== Brackets ==
First round
29 March 2019
Sài Gòn (1)	6
Bình Định (2)	1
29 March 2019
Sanna Khánh Hòa BVN (2)	0
An Giang (2)	2
29 March 2019
Đồng Tháp (2)	3
XM Fico Tây Ninh (2)	4
30 March 2019
Phù Đổng (2)	0
Quảng Nam (1)	1
31 March 2019
Đắk Lắk (2)	0
Hoàng Anh Gia Lai (1)	2
30 March 2019
Long An (2)	1(3)
Dược Nam Hà Nam Định (1)	1(5)
30 March 2019
Bình Phước (2)	2(8)
XSKT Cần Thơ (2)	2(7)
31 March 2019
Huế (2)	0
Hồng Lĩnh Hà Tĩnh (2)	1
31 March 2019
SHB Đà Nẵng (1)	0
Hải Phòng (1)	1
31 March 2019
CLB Phố Hiến (2)	1
TP Hồ Chí Minh (1)	2

Round of 16
29 June 2019
Sài Gòn (1)	4
An Giang (2)	2
30 June 2019
Becamex Bình Dương (1)	5
XM Fico Tây Ninh (2)	0
29 June 2019
Sông Lam Nghệ An (1)	2(8)
Quảng Nam (1)	2(9)
28 June 2019
Than Quảng Ninh (1)	2(4)
Hoàng Anh Gia Lai (1)	2(5)
28 June 2019
Dược Nam Hà Nam Định (1)	3
Bình Phước (2)	0
30 June 2019
Hà Nội (1)	3
Hồng Lĩnh Hà Tĩnh (2)	1
29 June 2019
Thanh Hóa (1)	1
Hải Phòng (1)	2
28 June 2019
Viettel (1)	3(3)
TP Hồ Chí Minh (1)	3(4)

Quarter-Finals
4 July 2019
Sài Gòn (1)	0
Becamex Bình Dương (1)	1
3 July 2019
Quảng Nam (1)	0(5)
Hoàng Anh Gia Lai (1)	0(4)
4 July 2019
Nam Định (1)	3
Hà Nội (1)	4
3 July 2019
Hải Phòng (1)	0(3)
Hồ Chí Minh City (1)	0(5)

Semi-Finals
27 October 2019
Becamex Bình Dương (1)	1
Quảng Nam (1)	2
27 October 2019
Hà Nội (1)	3
Ho Chi Minh City (1)	0

Final
31 October 2019
Quảng Nam (1)	1
Hà Nội (1)	2
