= Vietnamese National U-17 Football Championship =

- Founded: 2004
- Country: Việt Nam
- Confederation: AFC
- Current champions: Hà Nội (2nd title) (2025)
- Most championships: Sông Lam Nghệ An (8 titles)
- Website: Official website
- Current: Current season

The Vietnamese National U17 Football Championship (Vietnamese: Giải bóng đá U17 Quốc gia), is the national championship of association football for male players under the age of 17 organized by Vietnam Football Federation (VFF).

== Results ==
| Year | Host | Final | | | Semi-finalist |
| Year | Host | Champion | Score | Runner-up | Semi-finalist |
|---|---|---|---|---|---|
Under-18s
| 2004 | Hải Phòng | Sông Lam Nghệ An | 1–1 (6-5 p.) | Thành Long | Đồng Tháp; SHB Đà Nẵng |
| 2005 | Ho Chi Minh City | Sông Lam Nghệ An | 2–2 (4–3 p.) | Hồ Chí Minh City | Đồng Nai; Thể Công |
Under-17s
| 2006 | An Giang | Sông Lam Nghệ An | 2–1 | SHB Đà Nẵng | Thành Long; Nam Định |
| 2007 | Ho Chi Minh City | Sông Lam Nghệ An | 0–0 (8–7 p.) | SHB Đà Nẵng | VST; Than Quảng Ninh |
| 2008; Cúp Báo Bóng Đá | Đà Nẵng | Sông Lam Nghệ An | 5–2 | SHB Đà Nẵng | Becamex Bình Dương; Bình Định |
| 2009; Cúp Hải Nhân | Nam Định | Sông Lam Nghệ An | 1–0 | Đồng Tháp | Huế; Nam Định |
| 2010; Cúp Báo Bóng Đá | Đà Nẵng | SHB Đà Nẵng | 1–0 | Sông Lam Nghệ An | Đồng Tâm Long An; Nam Định |
| 2011; Cúp Thái Sơn Nam | Khánh Hòa | SHB Đà Nẵng | 2–1 | Hoàng Anh Gia Lai | Khatoco Khánh Hòa; Viettel |
| 2012; Cúp Thái Sơn Nam | Thừa Thiên Huế | Sông Lam Nghệ An | 7–2 | Đồng Tâm Long An | Hoàng Anh Gia Lai; Huế |
| 2013; Cúp Thái Sơn Nam | Ho Chi Minh City | SHB Đà Nẵng | 3–3 (6–5 p.) | PVF | Hà Nội T&T; Đồng Tâm Long An |
| 2014; Cúp Thái Sơn Nam | Thừa Thiên Huế | PVF | 2–0 | Hà Nội T&T | Becamex Bình Dương; Viettel |
| 2015; Cúp Thái Sơn Nam | Ho Chi Minh City | PVF | 0-0 (4–3 p.) | Viettel | Sông Lam Nghệ An; Quảng Ngãi |
| 2016; Cúp Thái Sơn Nam | Tây Ninh; Ho Chi Minh City | Đồng Tháp | 2–1 | PVF | Hà Nội T&T; Viettel |
| 2017; Cúp Thái Sơn Nam | Ho Chi Minh City | PVF | 2–1 | Viettel | Hồ Chí Minh City; Hoàng Anh Gia Lai |
| 2018; Cúp Thái Sơn Nam | Hưng Yên | Viettel | 3–1 | Sông Lam Nghệ An | PVF; SHB Đà Nẵng |
| 2019; Next Media | Tây Ninh | Thanh Hóa | 0–0 (5–4 p.) | PVF | Viettel; Hoàng Anh Gia Lai |
| 2020; Next Media | Hưng Yên | Sông Lam Nghệ An | 3–2 | Nutifood | PVF; Hoàng Anh Gia Lai |
| 2021 | not organised due to COVID-19 | | | | |
| 2022; K.Elec | Ho Chi Minh City | PVF | 2–0 | Sài Gòn | Sông Lam Nghệ An; Hà Nội |
| 2023; Cúp Thái Sơn Nam | Hưng Yên | Viettel | 4–2 | Hồng Lĩnh Hà Tĩnh | PVF; Sông Lam Nghệ An |
| 2024; Cúp Thái Sơn Nam | Bà Rịa-Vũng Tàu | Hà Nội | 2–0 | LPBank Hoàng Anh Gia Lai | Hồng Lĩnh Hà Tĩnh; PVF |
| 2025; Cúp Thái Sơn Nam | Ho Chi Minh City | Hà Nội | 3–2 | Thép Xanh Nam Định | SHB Đà Nẵng; Thể Công-Viettel |

== Top-performing clubs ==
| Clubs | Champion | Runner-up |
|---|---|---|
| Sông Lam Nghệ An | 8 (2004, 2005, 2006, 2007, 2008, 2009, 2012, 2020) | 2 (2010, 2018) |
| PVF | 4 (2014, 2015, 2017, 2022) | 2 (2016, 2019) |
| SHB Đà Nẵng | 3 (2010, 2011, 2013) | 3 (2006, 2007, 2008) |
| Thể Công-Viettel | 2 (2018, 2023) | 2 (2015, 2017) |
| Hà Nội | 2 (2024, 2025) | 1 (2014) |
| Đồng Tháp | 1 (2016) | 1 (2009) |
| Thanh Hóa | 1 (2019) | - |
| Hoàng Anh Gia Lai | - | 2 (2011, 2024) |
| Thành Long | - | 1 (2004) |
| Hồ Chí Minh City Football Federation | - | 1 (2005) |
| Đồng Tâm Long An | - | 1 (2012) |
| Nutifood | - | 1 (2020) |
| Sài Gòn | - | 1 (2022) |
| Nam Định | - | 1 (2025) |

== Awards ==
| Year | Best player | | Top scores | | Best goalkeeper | |
| Year | Player | Club | Player | Club | Player | Club |
|---|---|---|---|---|---|---|
| 2004 | Nguyễn Văn Khải | Thành Long | Nguyễn Văn Khải; Nguyễn Văn Mộc | TĐCS Đồng Tháp | Nguyễn Thanh Tùng | Hải Phòng |
| 2005 | Nguyễn Quang Tình | Sông Lam Nghệ An | Nguyễn Quang Tình; Phạm Hữu Phát | Sông Lam Nghệ An; Đồng Nai | Nguyễn Thanh Tùng | Hải Phòng |
| 2006 | Nguyễn Văn Quân | SHB Đà Nẵng | Hoàng Danh Ngọc; Lê Đức Tài; Nguyễn Hồng Việt | Nam Định; Thành Long; Sông Lam Nghệ An | Nguyễn Thanh Tùng | Sông Lam Nghệ An |
| 2007 | Phạm Văn Thọ | Sông Lam Nghệ An | Trần Văn Thành | Sông Lam Nghệ An | Phùng Vĩ Bảo | SHB Đà Nẵng |
| 2008 | Nguyễn Đình Bảo | Sông Lam Nghệ An | Nguyễn Đình Bảo | Sông Lam Nghệ An | Trần Nguyên Mạnh | Sông Lam Nghệ An |
| 2009 | Phan Văn Nhật | Đồng Tháp | Nguyễn Minh Trung | Đồng Tháp | Lê Văn Hùng | Sông Lam Nghệ An |
| 2010 | Phạm Mạnh Hùng | Sông Lam Nghệ An | Đỗ Văn Ba; Võ Ngọc Toàn; Hoàng Văn Nhuần | SHB Đà Nẵng; Sông Lam Nghệ An; Nam Định | Nguyễn Sơn Hải | SHB Đà Nẵng |
| 2011 | Đặng Anh Tuấn | SHB Đà Nẵng | Nguyễn Viết Thắng; Hồ Tuấn Tài | SHB Đà Nẵng; Sông Lam Nghệ An | Huỳnh Bá Lệnh | Khatoco Khánh Hòa |
| 2012 | Bùi Đình Châu | Sông Lam Nghệ An | Hồ Tuấn Tài | Sông Lam Nghệ An | Vĩnh Phú | Đồng Tâm Long An |
| 2013 | Phan Văn Long | SHB Đà Nẵng | Dương Anh Tú | Đồng Tâm Long An | Trần Bun | SHB Đà Nẵng |
| 2014 | Nguyễn Quang Hải | Hà Nội T&T | Trần Duy Khánh | Becamex Bình Dương | Nguyễn Thanh Tuấn | PVF |
| 2015 | Bùi Tiến Dụng | PVF | Phạm Trọng Hóa; Đỗ Thanh Thịnh | PVF | Phan Văn Biểu | PVF |
| 2016 | Trần Công Minh | Đồng Tháp | Trương Tiến Anh; Phạm Ngô Tấn Tài | Viettel; PVF | Nguyễn Nhật Trường | Đồng Tháp |
| 2017 | Nhâm Mạnh Dũng | Viettel | Nhâm Mạnh Dũng | Viettel | Trương Thái Hiếu | PVF |
| 2018 | Võ Nguyên Hoàng | PVF | Võ Nguyên Hoàng; Đặng Ngọc Đức | PVF; Viettel | Nguyễn Văn Chức | Viettel |
| 2019 | Võ Nguyên Hoàng | PVF | Nguyễn Văn Tùng | Thanh Hóa | Lê Trung Tuấn | Thanh Hóa |
| 2020 | Nguyễn Văn Bách | Sông Lam Nghệ An | Dương Quang Trung Hiếu | Nutifood | Nguyễn Cảnh Tiệp | Sông Lam Nghệ An |
| 2022 | Thái Bá Đạt | PVF | Thái Bá Đạt | PVF | Nguyễn Bảo Ngọc | Sông Lam Nghệ An |
| 2023 | Nguyễn Công Phương | Viettel | Nguyễn Công Phương; Nguyễn Trọng Tuấn | Viettel; Sông Lam Nghệ An | Lương Anh Chiến | Viettel |
| 2024 | Đặu Hồng Phong | Hà Nội | Nguyễn Việt Long; Đặng Công Anh Kiệt; Trần Hồng Kiên | Hà Nội; Hà Nội; Thể Công-Viettel | Nguyễn Văn Thăng Long | Hà Nội |
| 2025 | Chu Ngọc Nguyễn Lực | Hà Nội | Trần Mạnh Quân | Hà Nội | Chu Bá Huấn | Hà Nội |
