= PVF Football Academy =

Vietnamese football club

PVF Youth Football Academy
- Full name: PVF Youth Football Training Center - Ministry of Public Security
- Short name: PVF
- Founded: 2009; 17 years ago
- Ground: PVF Stadium, Hưng Yên, Vietnam
- Capacity: 4,500
- Owner: Vietnam Ministry of Public Security
- Manager: Nguyễn Duy Đông
- League: Vietnamese Second Division
- 2026: Vietnamese Second Division, 4th of 7 (Group A)
- Website: www.pvf.com.vn

The Promotion Fund of Vietnamese Football Talent Football Academy (PVF Academy), officially operating as the PVF Youth Football Training Center - Ministry of Public Security (Vietnamese: Trung tâm Đào tạo Bóng đá trẻ PVF - Bộ Công An), is a privately-founded, state-governed football academy based in Hưng Yên. The institution is now under the formal administration of the Vietnam Ministry of Public Security. PVF currently play in Vietnamese Football League Second Division, the third tier of the Vietnamese football league system.

By 2020, PVF has been recognized by the Asian Football Confederation (AFC) as a three-star academy under the AFC Elite Youth Scheme, becoming the first football academy in Southeast Asia to enjoy the status.

== History ==
The Promotion Fund of Vietnamese Football Talent (PVF, Vietnamese: Quỹ Đầu tư và Phát triển Tài năng Bóng đá Việt Nam) was founded and contributed capital by 03 members of Vingroup Group: Thien Tam Fund (80% contribution); PVF Investment and Trading, JSC (10%) and Vinpearl One Member Limited Company (10%). The foundation was founded on the idea of the late Prime Minister Vo Van Kiet with the aim of forming a system of training young professional soccer players of international standards, contributing to building young generations of young players. the talent and ethics, culture for the country football.

On December 4, 2008, PVF officially launched and June 12, 2009 opened the first course with 50 students selected from all over the country at the age of birth in 1997–1998. Since its founding, PVF's teams have made great achievements in the national youth football tournaments. By the beginning of 2016, PVF has made seven enrollments nationwide and has 175 students from 11 to 18 years of age in eight gifted classes. In the V-League 2016, all 13 players of the first course were loaned to PVF for loan.

PVF's training complex, the PVF Youth Football Training Center is one of the most modern football training centers in Southeast Asia.

== Facilities ==
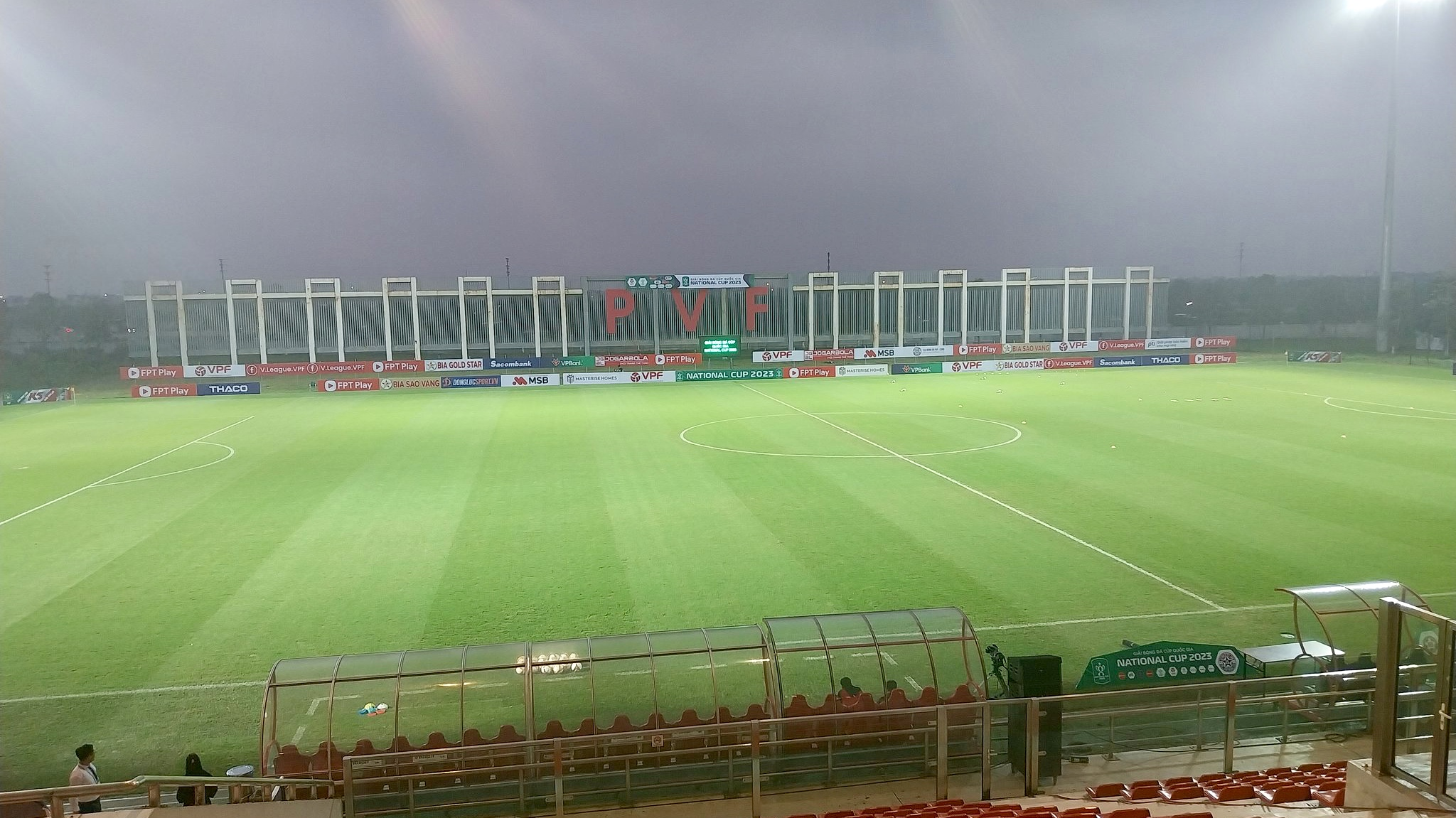
PVF Stadium has a capacity of 3.600 seats

PVF football training center is invested by Vingroup to build the most modern facilities on the area of nearly 22ha. PVF is equipped with the world's first soccer-themed decorations such as the dream: the 360s studio set was developed by Portugal's Benfica Lab 1; PlayerTek - Player performance monitor; sports science and sports facilities with 1600m2 gym equipped with 66 specialized equipment; 02 extreme polar extremes, 01 foam processing material under water.

With stadium 3,600 web pages equipped with system technology and standard tournament equipment of the national tournament, is a set of systems of Vietnam including 06 stadiums 11v11 with grass field staff created. FIFA Quality Pro certification. The special, first at a field, standard roof panel 11v11 was built with a 12m high covering covering the entire area of more than 8,800 m2. Design and build the airport design from the best materials and equipment: drainage systems in Australia's Megaflo, the Hunter system in the United States, and plants that produce Greenfields products in the Netherlands.

PVF continues to lead the 8-storey dormitory system with a cafeteria, conference hall, library, movie theater, gym and sports tournaments.

== Honours ==
=== National competitions ===
Senior tournaments

- Vietnamese Second League

Group third place : 2020

- Vietnamese Third League

Group winners : 2019

Youth tournaments

- Vietnam National U-21 Championship

(gold) Winners : 2023, 2025
(silver) Runners-up : 2019, 2024
(bronze) Third place : 2021

- Vietnam National U-19 Championship

(gold) Winners : 2015, 2020, 2021, 2024–25
(silver) Runners-up : 2017, 2025–26
(bronze) Third place : 2016

- Vietnam National U-17 Championship

(gold) Winners : 2014, 2015, 2017, 2022, 2025
(silver) Runners-up : 2013, 2016, 2019
(bronze) Third place : 2018, 2020, 2023, 2024

- Vietnam National U-15 Championship

(gold) Winners : 2012, 2013, 2017, 2022, 2023
(silver) Runners-up : 2014, 2015, 2016, 2019
(bronze) Third place : 2018, 2020

- Vietnamese National U-13 Championship

(gold) Winners : 2010, 2012, 2021
(silver) Runners-up : 2011, 2018
(bronze) Third place : 2019, 2022

- Vietnam National U-11 Championship

(gold) Winners : 2011
(bronze) Third place : 2019, 2020

== Current squad ==
As of 30 April 2026

Note: Flags indicate national team as defined under FIFA eligibility rules; some limited exceptions apply. Players may hold more than one non-FIFA nationality.

No.	Pos.	Nation	Player
1	GK	VIE	Phạm Huy Hoàng
2	DF	VIE	Lương Văn Phương
3	DF	VIE	Mai Trần Nhật Minh
4	DF	VIE	Lê Huy Việt Anh
5	DF	VIE	Lê Huy Thái
6	MF	VIE	Phạm Hùng Đại
7	FW	VIE	Hoàng Trọng Duy Khang
8	MF	VIE	Nguyễn Đức Nhật
9	FW	VIE	Trần Hoàng Khanh
10	FW	VIE	Nguyễn Trọng Đức Vũ
11	FW	VIE	Phùng Quang Tú
12	DF	VIE	Đặng Văn Hùng
14	MF	VIE	Khuất Đốn Tùng
15	DF	VIE	Vũ Kỳ
16	DF	VIE	Nguyễn Anh Tuấn
17	MF	VIE	Nguyễn Trung Anh Việt
18	MF	VIE	Bùi Duy Đăng

No.	Pos.	Nation	Player
19	FW	VIE	Nguyễn Văn Bách
20	DF	VIE	Trần Cao Cường
22	MF	VIE	Trần Gia Huy
23	GK	VIE	Phan Đình Bách
24	MF	VIE	Lê Tuấn Anh
26	DF	VIE	Trịnh Nam Khánh
29	DF	VIE	Trương Hữu Gia Thuận
30	MF	VIE	Vương Quốc Dũng (on loan from Sông Lam Nghệ An)
31	FW	VIE	Lê Bá Nam (on loan from Đông Á Thanh Hóa)
32	FW	VIE	Nguyễn Ngọc Cường (on loan from Đông Á Thanh Hóa)
33	FW	VIE	Lê Ngọc Đông (on loan from Đông Á Thanh Hóa)
34	DF	VIE	Nguyễn Thành Đạt
35	GK	VIE	Nguyễn Thành Long
36	FW	VIE	Hà Văn Kiệt (on loan from Đông Á Thanh Hóa)
58	GK	VIE	Nguyễn Quốc Anh
78	DF	VIE	Lê Nguyễn Quốc Trung
79	DF	VIE	Lê Nguyễn Quốc Kiên

== Management ==
Management	Name
Academy directress	Phan Thu Hương
Technical director	Marco Pezzaiuoli
Head coach	Hoàng Tuấn Anh
Assistant coach	Trịnh Quang Vinh
Goalkeeper coach	Trần Văn Điền
Technical analyst	Nguyễn Hoàng Sơn; Nguyễn Hoàng Việt; Nguyễn Xuân Quang
Physiotherapist	Đinh Hoàng Long; Nguyễn Thị Ly
Kitman	Nguyễn Đức Tính

== Sponsors ==
Official Global Partners
(Japan) Jogarbola
(Vietnam) Van Lang University

== Notable alumni ==
Since its first generation graduated players in 2016, PVF Academy officially granted certificates of completion of formation courses to players and then handed some of them to Vietnamese professional football clubs. Therefore, since 2018, Phố Hiến FC was established and competes in the V.League 2, the second highest tier in the Vietnamese professional football system. The team is considered as the first team of the PVF Football Academy and is constituted mainly by its players. Below is a non-exhaustive list of notable players who trained in the youth or reserve teams of PVF. Players in bold are those who capped for their National team.

- Bùi Ngọc Long
- Bùi Tiến Dụng
- Bùi Văn Bình
- **Bùi Vĩ Hào**
- Đỗ Thanh Thịnh
- **Hà Đức Chinh**
- Hồ Minh Dĩ
- **Hồ Văn Cường**
- Huỳnh Công Đến
- Lâm Thuận
- **Lê Ngọc Bảo**
- **Lê Văn Đô**
- **Lê Văn Xuân**
- Lê Xuân Tú
- Mạc Đức Việt Anh
- Ngô Tùng Quốc
- Nguyễn Bảo Long
- Nguyễn Đức Phú
- **Nguyễn Hiểu Minh**
- Nguyễn Gia Bảo
- Nguyễn Hồng Sơn
- Nguyễn Lê Phát
- Nguyễn Quốc Khánh
- Nguyễn Quốc Việt
- **Nguyễn Thanh Nhàn**
- Nguyễn Trọng Hùng
- Nguyễn Trọng Long
- Nguyễn Vũ Tín
- Nguyễn Xuân Bắc
- Phạm Trọng Hoá
- Thái Bá Đạt
- **Trương Văn Thái Quý**
- Võ Anh Quân
- Võ Nguyên Hoàng

== Relations with clubs ==
In March 2016, PVF and Gamba Osaka (Japan) signed a comprehensive cooperation agreement in two years. Gamba Osaka team will take the coach to help PVF train players, as well as select a number of potential faces to bring to Japan for advanced training or competition for Gamba Osaka. In addition, each year, Gamba Osaka will invite PVF youth teams to Japan to compete in international competitions held by this club.

== Domestic record ==
The season-by-season performance of PVF in the Vietnamese football league system:

Season	Division	Tier	Position
2018	Third Division	IV	3rd (Group A)
2019	Third Division	IV	1st ↑ (Group A)
2020	Second Division	IV	3rd (Group A)
2021	Second Division	IV	Cancelled
2022	Second Division	IV	6th (Group A)
2023	Second Division	IV	4th (Group A)
2024	Second Division	IV	6th (Group A)
2025	Second Division	IV	4th (Group A)
2026	Second Division	IV	4th (Group A)

↑ Promoted	↓ Relegated	Champions
