= 2009 AFF U-19 Youth Championship =

2009 AFF U-19 Championship
- Competition Logo

Tournament details
- Host country: Vietnam
- City: Ho Chi Minh City
- Dates: 4–12 August
- Teams: 8 (from 1 confederation)
- Venue: 2 (in 1 host city)

Final positions
- Champions: Thailand (1st title)
- Runners-up: Australia
- Third place: Vietnam
- Fourth place: Malaysia

Tournament statistics
- Matches played: 16
- Goals scored: 51 (3.19 per match)
- Top scorer: (Malaysia) Thamil Arasu Ambumanee (5 goals)

The 2009 AFF U19 Youth Championship or AFF U.19 Kova Paint Cup 2009 was the sixth edition of the tournament organized by the ASEAN Football Federation and was hosted by Vietnam for the second time. The matches were played in Ho Chi Minh City from the 4th to the 12th of August 2009. Vietnamese company Kova Paint have become the sponsors of the tournament.

== Teams ==
Brunei, Philippines, Laos and Indonesia were scheduled to take part in the competition but withdrew a week before it started due to health concerns over the swine flu. Malaysia also planned to withdraw but went ahead and took part in the competition.

Macau were also planning to join this edition of the tournament, but their plans never came to fruition.

== Tournament ==
All times are Indochina Time (ICT) - UTC+7

=== Group stage ===
Prior to withdrawals, the following was the original grouping of the teams.

Group A	Group B	Group C
Singapore; Malaysia; Vietnam; Philippines	Cambodia; Australia; Laos; Thailand	Indonesia; Myanmar; Timor-Leste; Brunei

==== Group A ====
Team	Pld	W	D	L	GF	GA	GD	Pts
Thailand	3	2	1	0	5	1	+4	7
Australia	3	1	2	0	5	2	+3	5
Singapore	3	1	1	1	4	3	+1	4
Cambodia	3	0	0	3	1	9	−8	0

4 August 2009
15:30

Cambodia	0 – 3	Thailand
	Report	Adisak 41'; Sarach 73'; Natthawut 84'

Thong Nhat Stadium

4 August 2009
17:45

Singapore	1 – 1	Australia
Khairul 65'	Report	Babalj 20'

Thanh Long Centre

6 August 2009
15:30

Thailand	1 – 1	Australia
Surachet 90'	Report	Franjic 84'

Thong Nhat Stadium

6 August 2009
17:45

Singapore	3 – 1	Cambodia
Syafiq 57'; Safuwan 79'; Zulfahmi 90+1'	Report	Udom 17'

Thanh Long Centre

8 August 2009
15:30

Cambodia	0 – 3	Australia
	Report	Virgili 41'; Taseski 42', 51'

Thanh Long Centre

8 August 2009
17:45

Thailand	1 – 0	Singapore
Adisak 77'	Report

Thong Nhat Stadium

==== Group B ====
Team	Pld	W	D	L	GF	GA	GD	Pts
Vietnam	3	3	0	0	8	2	+6	9
Malaysia	3	2	0	1	9	3	+6	6
Myanmar	3	1	0	2	4	5	−1	3
Timor-Leste	3	0	0	3	2	13	−11	0

4 August 2009
15:30

Myanmar	3 – 0 Awarded	Timor-Leste

Thanh Long Centre

4 August 2009
17:45

Malaysia	0 – 2	Vietnam
	Report	Đình Bảo 47'; Văn Quyết 61'

Thong Nhat Stadium

6 August 2009
15:30

Timor-Leste	1 – 7	Malaysia
?	Report	Thamil 18' (pen.), 33', 73' (pen.), 84', 87'; Fandi 24'; Fadhli 82'

Thanh Long Centre
Referee: Allan Martinez (Philippines)

6 August 2009
17:45

Vietnam	3 – 1	Myanmar
Đình Bảo 59'; Minh Tuấn 70'; Văn Quyết 90'	Report	Kyaw Ko Ko 38'

Thong Nhat Stadium

8 August 2009
17:45

Malaysia	2 – 0	Myanmar
Saiful 8'; Zack 14'	Report

Thong Nhat Stadium

8 August 2009
17:45

Vietnam	3 – 1	Timor-Leste
Quốc Phương 26', 80'; Trần Tuân 90+2'	Report	Fonseca 36'

Thanh Long Stadium

=== Knockout stage ===
==== Bracket ====
Semi-finals
10 August – Ho Chi Minh City (Thanh Long)
Thailand	1
Malaysia	0
10 August – Ho Chi Minh City (Thanh Long)
Vietnam	1
Australia	4

Final
12 August – Ho Chi Minh City (Thanh Long)
Thailand (p)	2 (5)
Australia	2 (3)
Third place
12 August – Ho Chi Minh City (Thanh Long)
Malaysia	0
Vietnam	3

==== Semi-finals ====
10 August 2009
15:15

Thailand	1 – 0	Malaysia
Surachet 55'	Report

Thanh Long Stadium

10 August 2009
17:45

Australia	4 – 1	Vietnam
Leckie 28'; Bowles 70'; Virgili 82'; Groenewald 86'	Report	Minh Tuấn 34'

Thanh Long Stadium

==== Third place play-off ====
12 August 2009
15:30

Malaysia	0 – 3	Vietnam
	Report	Tấn Tài 26'; Quốc Phương 35'; Minh Tuấn 68'

Thanh Long Stadium

==== Final ====
12 August 2009
17:45

Thailand	2 – 2 (a.e.t.)	Australia
Natthawut 69'; Adisak 101'	Report	McGowan 90'; Lum 120'
Penalties
	5 – 3

Thanh Long Stadium

== Winner ==
2009 AFF U-19 Youth Championship winners

Thailand
2nd title

== Goalscorers ==
5 goals

- (Malaysia) A. Thamil Arasu

3 goals

- (Thailand) Adisak Kraisorn
- (Vietnam) Lê Quốc Phương
- (Vietnam) Hà Minh Tuấn

2 goals

- (Australia) James Virgili
- (Australia) Kliment Taseski
- (Thailand) Surachet Ngamtip
- (Thailand) Natthawut Khamrin
- (Vietnam) Nguyễn Đình Bảo
- (Vietnam) Nguyễn Văn Quyết

1 goal

- (Australia) Dylan McGowan
- (Australia) Jared Lum
- (Australia) Mathew Leckie
- (Australia) Eli Babalj
- (Australia) Peter Franjic
- (Australia) Daniel Bowles
- (Australia) Joshua Groenewald
- (Cambodia) Prak Mony Udom
- (Malaysia) Fandi Othman
- (Malaysia) Fadhli Shas
- (Malaysia) Saiful Ridzuwan
- (Malaysia) Wan Zack Haikal
- (Myanmar) Kyaw Ko Ko

1 goal

- (Singapore) Khairul Nizam
- (Singapore) Syafiq Zainal
- (Singapore) Safuwan Baharudin
- (Singapore) Zulfahmi Arifin
- (Thailand) Sarach Yooyen
- (Timor-Leste) José Carlos da Fonseca
- (Timor-Leste) Unknown
- (Vietnam) Trần Tuân
- (Vietnam) Nguyễn Tấn Tài

== See also ==
- AFC U-19 Championship
