= Ngô Quang Huy =

Ngô Quang Huy may refer to:

- Ngô Quang Huy (footballer)
- Ngô Quang Huy (tennis)
