= Phạm Văn Cường =

Vietnamese footballer

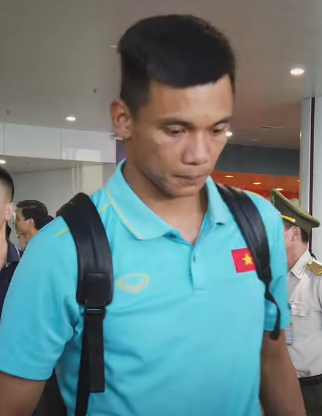
- Văn Cường in 2019

Personal information
- Full name: Phạm Văn Cường
- Date of birth: 19 July 1990 (age 36)
- Place of birth: Hưng Nguyên, Nghệ An, Vietnam
- Height: 1.83 m (6 ft 0 in)
- Position: Goalkeeper

Team information
- Current team: Đồng Tháp
- Number: 91

Youth career
- 2002–2008: Quân Khu 4

Senior career*
Years	Team	Apps	(Gls)
2008–2009	Quân Khu 4	13	(0)
2010–2013	Navibank Sài Gòn	34	(0)
2013–2014	Bình Định	12	(0)
2014–2020	Quảng Nam	145	(0)
2020–2022	Hồ Chí Minh City	1	(0)
2023–2025	SHB Đà Nẵng	12	(0)
2026	Đồng Tháp	0	(0)
- * Club domestic league appearances and goals as of 16 April 2023

Phạm Văn Cường (born 19 July 1990) is a Vietnamese professional footballer who plays as a goalkeeper for V.League 2 club Đồng Tháp.

== Honours ==
Quảng Nam

- V.League 1: 2017
- Vietnamese National Cup runner-up: 2019
- Vietnamese Super Cup: 2018

SHB Đà Nẵng

- V.League 2: 2023–24
