= Vietnamese National U-19 Football Championship =

- Founded: 1995
- Country: Việt Nam
- Confederation: AFC
- Number of clubs: 16 (final tournament)
- Current champions: Sông Lam Nghệ An (6th title) (2025–26)
- Most championships: Hà Nội (7 titles)
- Website: Official website
- Current: 2025–26 season

The Vietnamese National U19 Football Championship (Vietnamese: Giải bóng đá U19 Quốc gia) is the national championship of association football for male players under the age of 19 organized by the Vietnam Football Federation (VFF).

== Results ==
Year	Host	Final			Semi-finalists
Year	Host	Champion	Score	Runner-up	Semi-finalists
Under-19s
1995	Ho Chi Minh City	Bến Tre	1–1 (4–2 p.)	Hồ Chí Minh City	Công An Hà Nội; Quảng Ngãi
1996	Hanoi	Hồ Chí Minh City	1–0	Hà Nội	Thể Công
1997	Hanoi	Thanh Hóa	1–0	Thể Công	Hà Nội
Under-18s
1998	Hanoi	Thể Công	2–0	Hà Nội	Hồ Chí Minh City
1999	Ha Tinh; Nghe An	Sông Lam Nghệ An	2–0	Hà Tĩnh	Công An Hồ Chí Minh City; U17 Vietnam
2000	Ha Tinh	Hà Tĩnh	3–0	Nam Định	Sông Lam Nghệ An; Khatoco Khánh Hòa
2001	Khanh Hoa	Sông Lam Nghệ An	0–0 (5–3 p.)	Khatoco Khánh Hòa	Lâm Đồng; Nam Định
2002	Ho Chi Minh City	Thể Công	1–0	Sông Lam Nghệ An	Đồng Tháp; Hồ Chí Minh City
2003	Da Nang	Đồng Tháp	Round robin	Nam Định	Đà Nẵng
2004	Hai Phong	Sông Lam Nghệ An	0–0 (5–4 p.)	Thành Long	Đồng Tháp; Đà Nẵng
2005	Ho Chi Minh City	Sông Lam Nghệ An	2–2 (4–3 p.)	Hồ Chí Minh City	Thể Công; Đồng Nai
Under-19s
2006	Ho Chi Minh City	Sông Lam Nghệ An	3–0	Nam Định	Thành Long; Becamex Bình Dương
2007	Nam Dinh	Đồng Nai	1–0	Sông Lam Nghệ An	Hà Nội ACB; ĐPM Nam Định
2008	Ho Chi Minh City	Thành Long	3–0	Đồng Tâm Long An	Becamex Bình Dương; Bình Định
2009	Gia Lai	Viettel	0–0 (4–3 p.)	Hoàng Anh Gia Lai	Bình Thuận; Becamex Bình Dương
2010	Nghe An	Than Quảng Ninh	1–0	Cao su Đồng Tháp	SHB Đà Nẵng; Megastar Nam Định
2011	Phu Tho	Hà Nội T&T	1–1 (7–6 p.)	Sông Lam Nghệ An	Đồng Tâm Long An; Hòa Phát Hà Nội
2012	Da Nang	Cao su Đồng Tháp	1–0	SHB Đà Nẵng	Sông Lam Nghệ An; Hà Nội
2013	Gia Lai; Kon Tum	Khatoco Khánh Hòa	1–1 (4–3 p.)	Sông Lam Nghệ An	Hà Nội T&T; Hà Nội
2014	Gia Lai	Hà Nội T&T	0–0 (5–4 p.)	Sông Lam Nghệ An	Hoàng Anh Gia Lai; Viettel
2015	Nghe An	PVF	0–0 (4–3 p.)	Hà Nội T&T	Đồng Tâm Long An; Viettel
2016	Khanh Hoa	Hà Nội T&T	1–1 (6–5 p.)	Viettel	Sanna Khánh Hòa BVN; PVF
2017	Binh Dinh	Hà Nội	4–2	PVF	Viettel; Huế
2018	Thua Thien-Hue	Đồng Tháp	0–0 (3–2 p.)	Hà Nội	Viettel; Sông Lam Nghệ An
2019	Gia Lai	Hà Nội	1–0	Hoàng Anh Gia Lai	SHB Đà Nẵng; Sông Lam Nghệ An
2020	Hung Yen	PVF	2–0	Hoàng Anh Gia Lai I	Công An Nhân Dân; Sông Lam Nghệ An
2021	Binh Duong	PVF	4–1	Nutifood	Sông Lam Nghệ An; An Giang
2022	Hung Yen	Hà Nội	2–1	Viettel	Sông Lam Nghệ An; Nutifood
2023	Tay Ninh	Đông Á Thanh Hóa	1–0	Sông Lam Nghệ An	Hà Nội; SHB Đà Nẵng
2024	Binh Duong	Hà Nội	0–0 (4–2 p.)	Thể Công-Viettel	LPBank Hoàng Anh Gia Lai; Sông Lam Nghệ An
2024–25	Ba Ria-Vung Tau	PVF	1–0	Sông Lam Nghệ An	Bà Rịa-Vũng Tàu; Đồng Tháp
2025–26	Hung Yen	Sông Lam Nghệ An	0–0 (4–3 p.)	PVF-CAND	Hà Nội; Thể Công-Viettel I

== Top-performing clubs ==
Clubs	Champion	Runner-up
Hà Nội	7 (2011, 2014, 2016, 2017, 2019, 2022, 2024)	2 (2015, 2018)
Sông Lam Nghệ An	6 (1999, 2001, 2004, 2005, 2006, 2025–26)	7 (2002, 2007, 2011, 2013, 2014, 2023, 2024–25)
PVF	4 (2015, 2020, 2021, 2024–25)	1 (2017)
Thể Công-Viettel	3 (1998, 2002, 2009)	4 (1997, 2016, 2022, 2024)
Đồng Tháp	3 (2003, 2012, 2018)	1 (2010)
Hồ Chí Minh City Football Federation	1 (1996)	2 (1995, 2005)
Khatoco Khánh Hòa	1 (2013)	1 (2001)
Thành Long	1 (2008)	1 (2004)
Hà Tĩnh	1 (2000)	1 (1999)
Thanh Hóa	1 (2023)	-
Than Quảng Ninh	1 (2010)	-
Đồng Nai	1 (2007)	-
Thanh Hóa (1962)	1 (1997)	-
Bến Tre	1 (1995)	-

== Awards ==
Year	Best player		Top scores		Best goalkeeper	
Year	Player	Club	Player	Club	Player	Club
2004	Nguyễn Văn Khải	Thành Long	Nguyễn Văn Khải; Nguyễn Văn Mộc	TĐCS Đồng Tháp	Nguyễn Thanh Tùng	Hải Phòng
2005	Nguyễn Quang Tình	Sông Lam Nghệ An	Nguyễn Quang Tình; Phạm Hữu Phát	Sông Lam Nghệ An; Đồng Nai Berjaya	Nguyễn Thanh Tùng	Hải Phòng
2006	Nguyễn Ngọc Anh	Sông Lam Nghệ An	Nguyễn Hồng Việt	Sông Lam Nghệ An	Trần Huy Lê	Sông Lam Nghệ An
2007	Đặng Quốc Thịnh	Đồng Nai Berjaya	Nguyễn Đình Hiệp	Sông Lam Nghệ An	Nguyễn Thanh Thắng	Đồng Nai Berjaya
2008	Lê Đức Tài	Thành Long	Lê Đức Tài	Thành Long	Nguyễn Thành Nam	Thành Long
2009	Lê Duy Thanh	Hoàng Anh Gia Lai	Phạm Thanh Tấn	Hoàng Anh Gia Lai	Trần Anh Đức	Viettel
2010	Trần Đại Nghĩa	Than Quảng Ninh	Giang Trần Quách Tân; Bạch Đăng Khoa	Than Quảng Ninh; TĐCS Đồng Tháp	Huỳnh Tuấn Linh	Than Quảng Ninh
2011	Trần Văn Tâm	Hà Nội T&T	Nguyễn Việt Phong	Hòa Phát Hà Nội	Nguyễn Văn Công	Hà Nội T&T
2012	Nguyễn Viết Thắng	SHB Đà Nẵng	Cao Xuân Thắng	Sông Lam Nghệ An	Nguyễn Sơn Hải	TĐCS Đồng Tháp
2013	Lâm Ti Phông	Khatoco Khánh Hòa	Đồng Văn Chung	Sông Lam Nghệ An	Võ Ngọc Cường	Khatoco Khánh Hòa
2014	Nguyễn Quang Hải	Hà Nội T&T	Hồ Tuấn Tài; Hồ Minh Toàn	Sông Lam Nghệ An; Hoàng Anh Gia Lai	Lê Quang Tuấn	Hà Nội T&T
2015	Nguyễn Hữu Sơn	Hà Nội T&T	Nguyễn Tiến Linh	Becamex Bình Dương	Nguyễn Thanh Tuấn	PVF
2016	Nguyễn Hoàng Đức	Viettel	Phạm Tuấn Hải	Hà Nội T&T	Đỗ Sỹ Huy	Hà Nội T&T
2017	Lê Văn Nam	Hà Nội	Trần Danh Trung	Viettel	Dương Văn Cường	Sông Lam Nghệ An
2018	Trần Công Minh	Đồng Tháp	Lại Đức Anh; Lê Văn Xuân; Trần Công Minh	Sông Lam Nghệ An; Hà Nội; Đồng Tháp	Nguyễn Nhật Trường	Đồng Tháp
2019	Ngô Đức Hoàng	Hà Nội	Nguyễn Nam Trường; Võ Hoàng Minh Khoa; Phạm Bá Thảo; Kha Tấn Tài; Nguyễn Quốc Việt; Nguyễn Duy Tâm	Hà Nội; Becamex Binh Duong; SHB Đà Nẵng; An Giang; Hoàng Anh Gia Lai; Hoàng Anh Gia Lai	Quan Văn Chuẩn	Hà Nội
2020	Huỳnh Công Đến	PVF	Ngô Văn Lương; Nguyễn Quốc Việt	Sông Lam Nghệ An; Hoàng Anh Gia Lai 1	Huỳnh Trần Bảo Duy	Hoàng Anh Gia Lai 1
2021	Nguyễn Thanh Nhàn	PVF	Nguyễn Quốc Việt	Nutifood	Nguyễn Quang Trường	PVF
2022	Vũ Văn Sơn	Hà Nội	Nguyễn Văn Tú; Lê Quang Hiển	Viettel; Nutifood	Đoàn Huy Hoàng	Viettel
2023	Nguyễn Ngọc Mỹ	Đông Á Thanh Hóa	Hà Minh Đức	Đông Á Thanh Hóa	Lê Anh Tuấn	Đông Á Thanh Hóa
2024	Dương Đình Nguyên	Hà Nội	Nguyễn Đăng Khoa	Huế	Phạm Đình Hải	Hà Nội
2024–25	Khúc Trung Hiếu	PVF	Nguyễn Sỹ Mạnh Dũng	PVF	Phạm Huy Hoàng	PVF
2025–26	Hoàng Trọng Duy Khang	PVF-CAND	Hoàng Minh Hợi	Sông Lam Nghệ An	Nguyễn Bảo Ngọc	Sông Lam Nghệ An
