= Nguyễn Hồng Sơn (footballer, born 2000) =

Vietnamese association football player

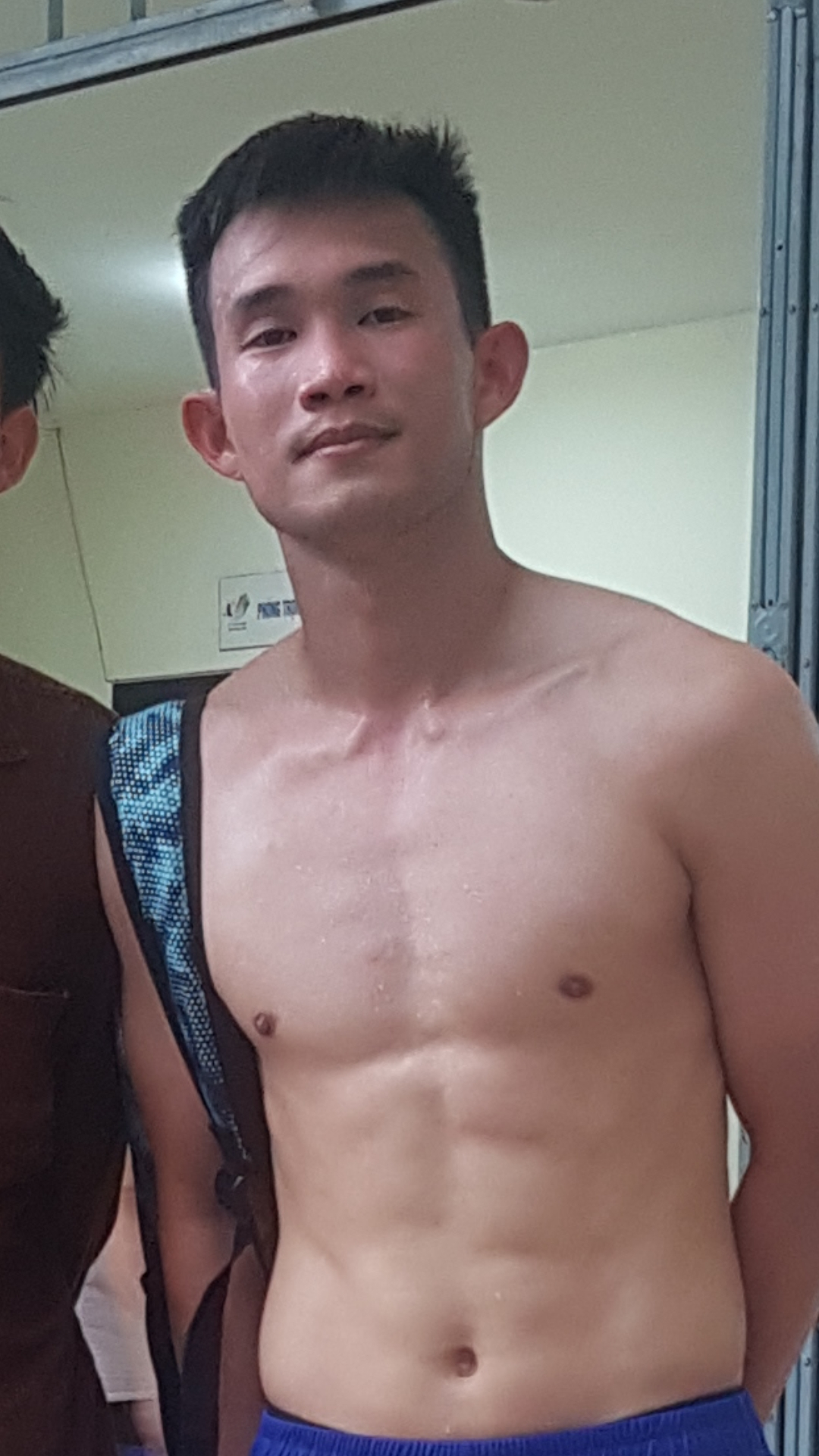
- Hồng Sơn in 2024

Personal information
- Full name: Nguyễn Hồng Sơn
- Date of birth: 24 October 2000 (age 26)
- Place of birth: Đồng Hới, Quảng Bình, Vietnam
- Height: 1.70 m (5 ft 7 in)
- Position: Attacking midfielder

Team information
- Current team: Đồng Tháp
- Number: 95

Youth career
- –2018: PVF

Senior career*
Years	Team	Apps	(Gls)
2018	→ Hà Nội (loan)	0	(0)
2019–2020	→ Quảng Nam (loan)	20	(0)
2021	Hà Nội	4	(0)
2022	Sài Gòn	20	(1)
2023	Phù Đổng	7	(0)
2024	Bắc Ninh		
2024–2025	SHB Đà Nẵng	15	(0)
2025–	Đồng Tháp	18	(0)

International career^{‡}
2015–2017	Vietnam U16	13	(1)
2017–2020	Vietnam U19	18	(7)
- * Club domestic league appearances and goals as of 3 April 2026 ‡ National team caps and goals as of 6 June 2018

Nguyễn Hồng Sơn (born 24 October 2000) is a Vietnamese professional footballer who plays as an attacking midfielder for V.League 2 club Đồng Tháp. Sơn holds the record for the fastest goal scored for Vietnam in the AFF U-18 Youth Championship's history, having scored after just 47 seconds against U19 Myanmar.

== Club career ==
After being recruited by the PVF Football Academy, Sơn later became the only Vietnamese youngster to secure a place at the Aspire Academy; however, he decided to stay in Vietnam.

Sơn was loaned to Hà Nội FC and won the 2018 V.League 1 with the team despite not making any appearances. Following controversy surrounding a game show which he participated, Sơn was banned from playing football by his club PVF for two years. After Quảng Nam FC persuaded PVF, he was loaned to the club. In his first year, he made nine appearances, helped the club avoided relegation in the league and reached the final of the 2019 Vietnamese Cup. Sơn returned to Hà Nội in 2021 and played for four games before signing for its reserve club Saigon FC a year later. After Saigon FC dissolved, Sơn became a free agent. In 2023, Sơn signed for the Phù Đổng Ninh Bình and played seven matches in First Division. The next season, Sơn joined Bắc Ninh FC. He was regarded as the "orchestrator" of the club, leading the team's style of play. Bắc Ninh still could not be promoted to the First Division after losing in the play-off. In 2024, Sơn joined V.League 1 club Đà Nẵng FC. Since Đà Nẵng did not extend his contract, Sơn joined First Division club Đồng Tháp FC for the 2025-26 season, expected to be "a key player in the midfield".

== International career ==
In the match between Vietnam U19 and Myanmar U19 in the 2017 AFF U-18 Youth Championship, receiving a pass from Lê Xuân Tú, Sơn scored and became the fastest goalscorer for Vietnam in the tournament's history after opening the score at 47 seconds. This surpassed the previous record by Hồ Minh Dĩ, who scored in the 2th minute against U19 Laos in the 2015 U-19 AFF Youth Championship, and only placed second behind Muhammad Rafli's goal against U19 Brunei in the same year.

In the 2018 Thanh Nien Newspaper International U-19 Football Tournament, Sơn scored four goals for the Vietnam U19 and was named as the best player of the tournament. In 2019, Sơn was called up among 48 players to the Vietnam U22 to prepare for the SEA Games 30, but he was not selected for the team at the end. In 2022, Sơn was again called up to the U22 team to prepare for the SEA Games 31 and was omitted from the final squad.

=== International goals ===
==== U-19 ====
#	Date	Venue	Opponent	Score	Result	Competition
1	7 September 2017	Yangon, Myanmar	Brunei	2–0	8-1	2017 AFF U-19 Youth Championship
2	13 September 2017	Yangon, Myanmar	Myanmar	1–0	1-2	2017 AFF U-19 Youth Championship
3	6 November 2017	Zhubei, Taiwan	Chinese Taipei	2–0	2-1	2018 AFC U-19 Championship qualification
4	20 April 2018	Suwon, South Korea	Morocco	1–1	1-1	2018 Suwon JS Cup

== Honours ==
Hà Nội

- V.League 1: 2018
- Vietnamese Super Cup: 2021

Quảng Nam

- Vietnamese National Cup: Runner-up 2019
