= 2004 Vietnamese National U-18 Football Championship =

2004 National U-18 Championship
Giải U-18 Quốc gia 2004

Tournament details
- Dates: 21 – 30 July
- Teams: 8
- Venue(s): 1 (in 1 host city)

Final positions
- Champions: Sông Lam Nghệ An
- Runners-up: Thành Long
- Third place: Đồng Tháp; Đà Nẵng

Tournament statistics
- Top scorer(s): Nguyễn Văn Khải (Thành Long); Nguyễn Văn Mộc (Đồng Tháp) (6 goals)
- Best player(s): Nguyễn Văn Khải (Thành Long)
- Best goalkeeper: Nguyễn Thanh Tùng (Hải Phòng)
- Fair play award: Đồng Tháp

The 2004 Vietnamese National U-18 Football Championship is the first edition of the Vietnamese National U-18 Football Championship, the annual youth football tournament organised by the Vietnam Football Federation (VFF) for male players under-18

== Qualified teams ==
- Hải Phòng
- Sông Lam Nghệ An
- Thành Long
- Đồng Tháp
- Đà Nẵng
- Phú Yên
- An Giang
- Tiền Giang

== Venues ==
Lạch Tray Stadium

== Final ==
30 July 2004

| Sông Lam Nghệ An | 1-1 | Thành Long |
|---|---|---|
| Minh Ngọc 37' | | Ngọc Tùng 80' |
Penalties
| | 6-5 |

Lạch Tray Stadium, Hải Phòng

Song Lam Nghe An won the championship for the second time.
