= Nguyễn Xuân Hùng =

Vietnamese footballer

Personal information
- Full name: Nguyễn Xuân Hùng
- Date of birth: 1 February 1991 (age 35)
- Place of birth: Ba Vì, Hanoi, Vietnam
- Height: 1.73 m (5 ft 8 in)
- Position: Full-back

Youth career
- 2004–2010: Viettel

Senior career*
Years	Team	Apps	(Gls)
2011–2013	Hà Nội	32	(2)
2014–2020	Than Quảng Ninh	108	(3)
2021–2024	Hồng Lĩnh Hà Tĩnh	46	(1)
Total		186	(6)

International career
2010–2011	Vietnam U17	3	(0)
2011–2012	Vietnam U19	6	(0)
2013–2014	Vietnam U22	2	(0)
2014–2015	Vietnam	8	(1)
- * Club domestic league appearances and goals as of 15 July 2018

Nguyễn Xuân Hùng (born 1 February 1991) is a former Vietnamese footballer who last played as a full-back for Hồng Lĩnh Hà Tĩnh. He capped 8 times and scored 1 goal with the Vietnam national football team.
