= Trần Văn Bửu =

Vietnamese footballer

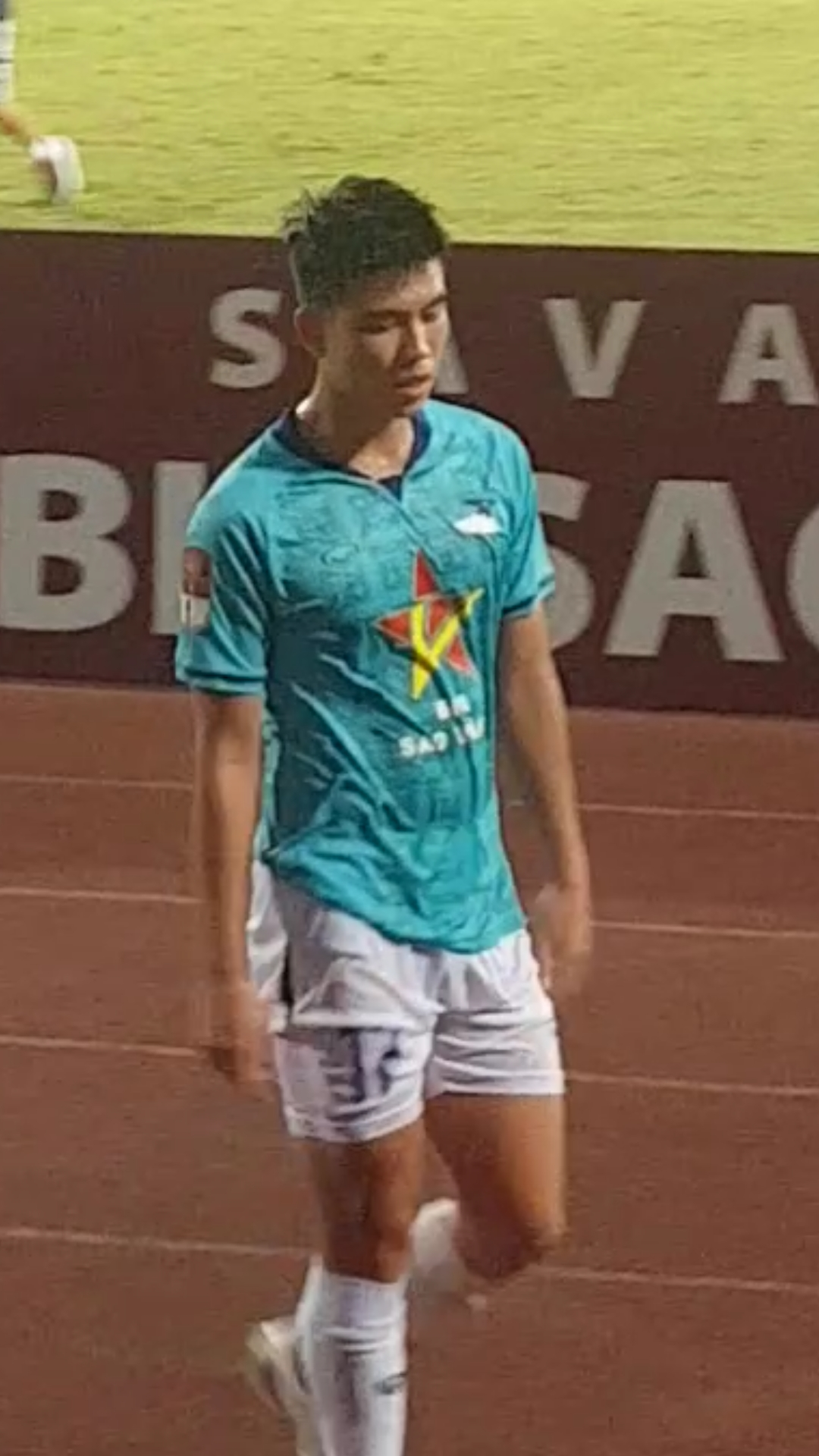
- Văn Bửu in 2024

Personal information
- Full name: Trần Văn Bửu
- Date of birth: 17 July 1998 (age 28)
- Place of birth: Hoàng Mai, Nghệ An, Vietnam
- Height: 1.68 m (5 ft 6 in)
- Position: Midfielder

Team information
- Current team: Hồng Lĩnh Hà Tĩnh
- Number: 17

Youth career
- –2018: Viettel

Senior career*
| Years | Team | Apps | (Gls) |
| 2018 | Phù Đổng | 13 | (0) |
| 2019–2020 | Sài Gòn | 11 | (0) |
| 2021–2023 | Quảng Nam | 22 | (0) |
| 2023– | Hồng Lĩnh Hà Tĩnh | 25 | (0) |

International career
| 2019 | Vietnam U21 | 3 | (1) |
- * Club domestic league appearances and goals as of 7 June 2026

Trần Văn Bửu (born 17 July 1998) is a Vietnamese professional footballer who plays as a midfielder for V.League 1 club Hồng Lĩnh Hà Tĩnh.

== Club career ==
Born in Nghệ An, Văn Bửu was formed at the Viettel academy based in Hanoi. In 2018, he was released by Viettel and joined Phù Đổng. With the team, he managed to win the promotion play-offs at the 2018 Vietnamese Second League, thus promote them to the V.League 2. He was then recruited by V.League 1 side Sài Gòn, where he united with Nguyễn Thành Công, his former coach at Viettel youth team.

After two seasons at the club, he left to join V.League 2 team Quảng Nam. There, he won the 2023 V.League 2.

In September 2023, Văn Bửu returned to V.League 1, signing for Hồng Lĩnh Hà Tĩnh.

== Honours ==
Quảng Nam

- V.League 2: 2023
