= 2020 Vietnamese National U-19 Football Championship =

Vietnamese National U-19 Football Championship
- Season: 2020
- Dates: 3 March – 28 June
- Champions: U19 Long An

The 2020 Vietnamese National U-19 Football Championship is split into five groups with the 5 group winners will advance to the second phase of the campaign along with the three best runners-up.

== Teams ==
A total of 26 teams will participate in the 2020 season with only players born between 1 January 2001 and 1 January 2004 are eligible for participation.

== First phase ==
The 26 teams were drawn into 4 groups of 5 teams (Groups B–E) with Group A having 6 teams, Each team in their respective groups will play each other twice. Eight teams will then progress to the second phase of the competition.

=== Group A ===
Pos	Team	Pld	W	D	L	GF	GA	GD	Pts	Qualification
1	PVF Vietnam U19	10	8	1	1	20	3	+17	25	Qualification Second phase
2	Viettel U19	10	7	1	2	19	10	+9	22	
3	Hanoi U19	10	5	4	1	16	5	+11	19	
4	Than Quảng Ninh U19	10	3	0	7	10	20	−10	9	
5	Phố Hiến U19	10	2	1	7	9	18	−9	7	
6	Nam Định U19	10	1	1	8	5	23	−18	4	

Source: Soccerway
Rules for classification: 1) Points; 2) Head-to-head points; 3) Head-to-head goal difference; 4) Head-to-head goals scored; 5) Goal difference; 6) Goals scored; 7) Draw;

=== Group B ===
Pos	Team	Pld	W	D	L	GF	GA	GD	Pts	Qualification
1	Sông Lam Nghệ An U19	8	6	1	1	16	2	+14	19	Qualification Second phase
2	Thanh Hóa U19	8	5	1	2	13	4	+9	16	
3	Đà Nẵng U19	8	4	3	1	13	5	+8	15	
4	Quảng Nam U19	8	1	2	5	5	13	−8	5	
5	Huế U19	8	0	1	7	3	26	−23	1	

Source: Soccerway
Rules for classification: 1) Points; 2) Head-to-head points; 3) Head-to-head goal difference; 4) Head-to-head goals scored; 5) Goal difference; 6) Goals scored; 7) Draw;

=== Group C ===
Pos	Team	Pld	W	D	L	GF	GA	GD	Pts	Qualification
1	Hoàng Anh Gia Lai U19	8	7	1	0	32	1	+31	22	Qualification Second phase
2	Công An Nhân Dân U19	8	6	1	1	32	3	+29	19	Qualification Second phase
3	Phú Yên U19	8	2	2	4	11	28	−17	8	
4	Đắk Lắk U19	8	1	1	6	8	27	−19	4	
5	Bình Định U19	8	1	1	6	7	31	−24	4	

Source: Soccerway
Rules for classification: 1) Points; 2) Head-to-head points; 3) Head-to-head goal difference; 4) Head-to-head goals scored; 5) Goal difference; 6) Goals scored; 7) Draw;

=== Group D ===
Pos	Team	Pld	W	D	L	GF	GA	GD	Pts	Qualification
1	Ho Chi Minh City U19	6	4	1	1	12	4	+8	13	Qualification Second phase
2	Hoang Anh JMG U19	6	3	2	1	11	8	+3	11	Qualification Second phase
3	Sanna Khánh Hòa BVN U19	6	2	1	3	12	12	0	7	
4	Bình Phước U19	6	1	0	5	7	18	−11	3	

Source: Soccerway
Rules for classification: 1) Points; 2) Head-to-head points; 3) Head-to-head goal difference; 4) Head-to-head goals scored; 5) Goal difference; 6) Goals scored; 7) Draw;

=== Group E ===
Pos	Team	Pld	W	D	L	GF	GA	GD	Pts	Qualification
1	Becamex Binh Duong U19	8	7	0	1	21	7	+14	21	Qualification Second phase
2	An Giang U19	8	5	2	1	14	4	+10	17	Qualification Second phase
3	Sài Gòn U19	8	4	1	3	9	7	+2	13	
4	Long An U19	8	1	2	5	11	16	−5	5	
5	Cần Thơ U19	8	0	1	7	4	25	−21	1	

Source: Soccerway
Rules for classification: 1) Points; 2) Head-to-head points; 3) Head-to-head goal difference; 4) Head-to-head goals scored; 5) Goal difference; 6) Goals scored; 7) Draw;

=== Best second-placed ===
Pos	Team	Pld	W	D	L	GF	GA	GD	Pts	Qualification
1	Công An Nhân Dân U19	8	6	1	1	32	3	+29	19	Qualification to the Second phase
2	An Giang U19	8	5	2	1	14	4	+10	17	Qualification to the Second phase
3	Thanh Hóa U19	8	5	1	2	13	4	+9	16	Qualification to the Second phase
4	Viettel U19	8	5	1	2	14	11	+3	16	
5	Hoang Anh JMG U19	6	3	2	1	11	8	+3	11	

Updated to match(es) played on 11 June 2020. Source: Soccerway
Rules for classification: 1) Points; 2) Goals scored; 3) Goal difference

== Second phase ==
=== Group A ===
Pos	Team	Pld	W	D	L	GF	GA	GD	Pts	Qualification
1	PVF Vietnam U19	2	1	1	0	2	1	+1	4	Qualification Final phase
2	Hoàng Anh Gia Lai U19	2	1	1	0	1	0	+1	4	Qualification Final phase
3	An Giang U19	2	1	0	1	2	2	0	3	
4	Ho Chi Minh City U19	2	0	0	2	0	2	−2	0	

Updated to match(es) played on 22 June 2020. Source: Soccerway
Rules for classification: 1) Points; 2) Head-to-head points; 3) Head-to-head goal difference; 4) Head-to-head goals scored; 5) Goal difference; 6) Goals scored; 7) Draw;

=== Group B ===
Pos	Team	Pld	W	D	L	GF	GA	GD	Pts	Qualification
1	Công An Nhân Dân U19	2	1	1	0	1	0	+1	4	Qualification Final phase
2	Becamex Binh Duong U19	2	1	0	1	2	2	0	3	Qualification Final phase
3	Sông Lam Nghệ An U19	2	1	0	1	2	2	0	3	
4	Hoanh Anh JMG U19	2	0	1	1	0	1	−1	1	

Updated to match(es) played on 21 June 2020. Source: Soccerway
Rules for classification: 1) Points; 2) Head-to-head points; 3) Head-to-head goal difference; 4) Head-to-head goals scored; 5) Goal difference; 6) Goals scored; 7) Draw;
