= Thái Bá Đạt =

Vietnamese footballer

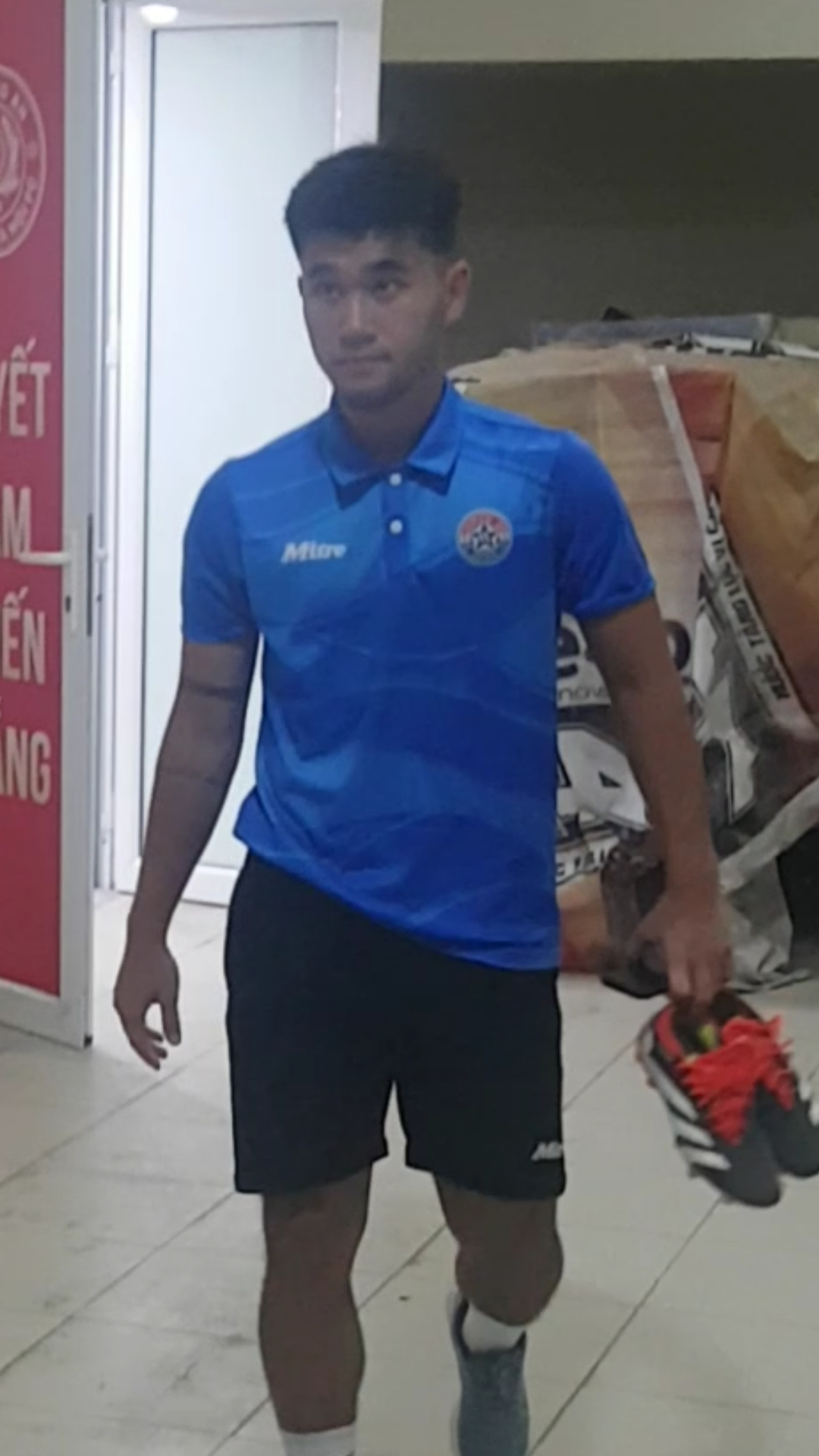
- Bá Đạt in 2024

Personal information
- Full name: Thái Bá Đạt
- Date of birth: 23 March 2005 (age 21)
- Place of birth: Thanh Hóa, Vietnam
- Height: 1.72 m (5 ft 8 in)
- Position: Midfielder

Team information
- Current team: Công An Nhân Dân
- Number: 17

Youth career
- 2012–2014: Viettel
- 2014–2023: PVF

Senior career*
Years	Team	Apps	(Gls)
2022–2023	PVF	13	(0)
2023–	Công An Nhân Dân	49	(8)

International career^{‡}
2023–	Vietnam U23	7	(0)
Medal record
Men's football
Representing Vietnam
AFF U-23 Championship
Winner	Thailand 2023
- * Club domestic league appearances and goals as of 12 June 2026 ‡ National team caps and goals as of 10 November 2026

Thái Bá Đạt (born 23 March 2005) is a Vietnamese professional footballer who plays as a midfielder for V.League 2 club Công An Nhân Dân and the Vietnam national under-23 team.

== Early career ==
Born in Thanh Hóa, Bá Đạt started his youth career playing for local team Viettel Sầm Sơn. In 2014, after participating in the Vietnamese National U11 Tournament qualifiers, Bá Đạt gained the attention of Nguyễn Duy Đông, the manager of U15 PVF. After his parents' agreement, Bá Đạt joined the PVF Football Academy. In 2020, Bá Đạt won the National U-15 Championship with PVF. Two years after, in 2022, as the captain of U17 PVF, Bá Đạt lead his team win the Vietnamese National U-17 Championship. He was the top scorer of the tournament with 5 goals and won the "Player of the tournament" award". His performances in the tournament made him one the most promising midfielders in his generation according to Vietnamese media.

In 2023, he captained PVF at the Vietnamese National U-21 Championship. He scored 3 goals during his team's campaign to ensure progression to the final match, where he scored the tournament-winning penalty kick for PVF against Sông Lam Nghệ An, which allowed his club to win their first U-21 title. Aftermath, he was given the "Best player of the tournament" award.

== Club career ==
With PVF, Bá Đạt played in the Vietnamese Football League Second Division during the 2022 and the 2023 season as his team finished 7th and 4th in the league regular season table, respectively.

Following much individual success for the reserves, Bá Đạt was promoted to PVF's first team PVF-CAND for the 2023–24 season. On 5 November 2023, made his professional debut in PVF-CAND 0–0 V.League 2 draw against SHB Đà Nẵng. On 3 December 2023, on his ever match as a starter for PVF-CAND, he scored a brace to help his team secure a 2–2 draw against Long An.

== International career ==
In March 2022, Bá Đạt took part in a training camp in Germany with Vietnam U17 team and played several friendlies against the youth side of Bundesliga teams.

In early 2023, Bá Đạt was included in Vietnam U20's final 23-men squad for the 2023 AFC U-20 Championship but didn't make any appearance as Vietnam was eliminated after three group stage games.

In August 2023, he received his first call up with Vietnam U23 and was selected in the final for the 2023 AFF U-23 Championship. He started in Vietnam U23 first group stage game against Laos U23. Bá Đạt appeared in the final match against Indonesia, as he came in as a substitute for Nguyễn Minh Quang during the extra time. The two teams ended on a goalless tie after 120 minutes and went to the penalty shootouts. Bá Đạt succeeded his shot on Vietnam's sixth attempt, scoring the winning penalty allowing his country to win their second AFF U-23 Championship title.

== Honours ==
Vietnam U23

- AFF U-23 Championship: 2023
- Gia Lai U-23 VTV Cup: 2026

=== Individual ===
- Vietnamese National U-17 Championship top scorer: 2022
- Vietnamese National U-21 Championship best player: 2023
