= Trần Văn Học =

Vietnamese footballer

Personal information
- Full name: Trần Văn Học
- Date of birth: February 3, 1987 (age 39)
- Place of birth: Đông Hà, Quảng Trị, Vietnam
- Height: 1.67 m (5 ft 6 in)
- Position: Left back

Youth career
- 2003–2006: SHB Đà Nẵng

Senior career*
Years	Team	Apps	(Gls)
2007–2011	SHB Đà Nẵng	31	(0)
2012	Khatoco Khánh Hòa	21	(0)
2013–2014	Hải Phòng	20	(1)
2015–2016	SHB Đà Nẵng	38	(1)
2017–2021	Quảng Nam	57	(1)
- * Club domestic league appearances and goals as of 22 June 2018

Trần Văn Học (born 3 February 1987, in Vietnam) is a Vietnamese footballer who plays as a left back for Quảng Nam

== Career ==
Trần started his career with SHB Đà Nẵng.
