= Nguyễn Văn Dũng =

Vietnamese footballer

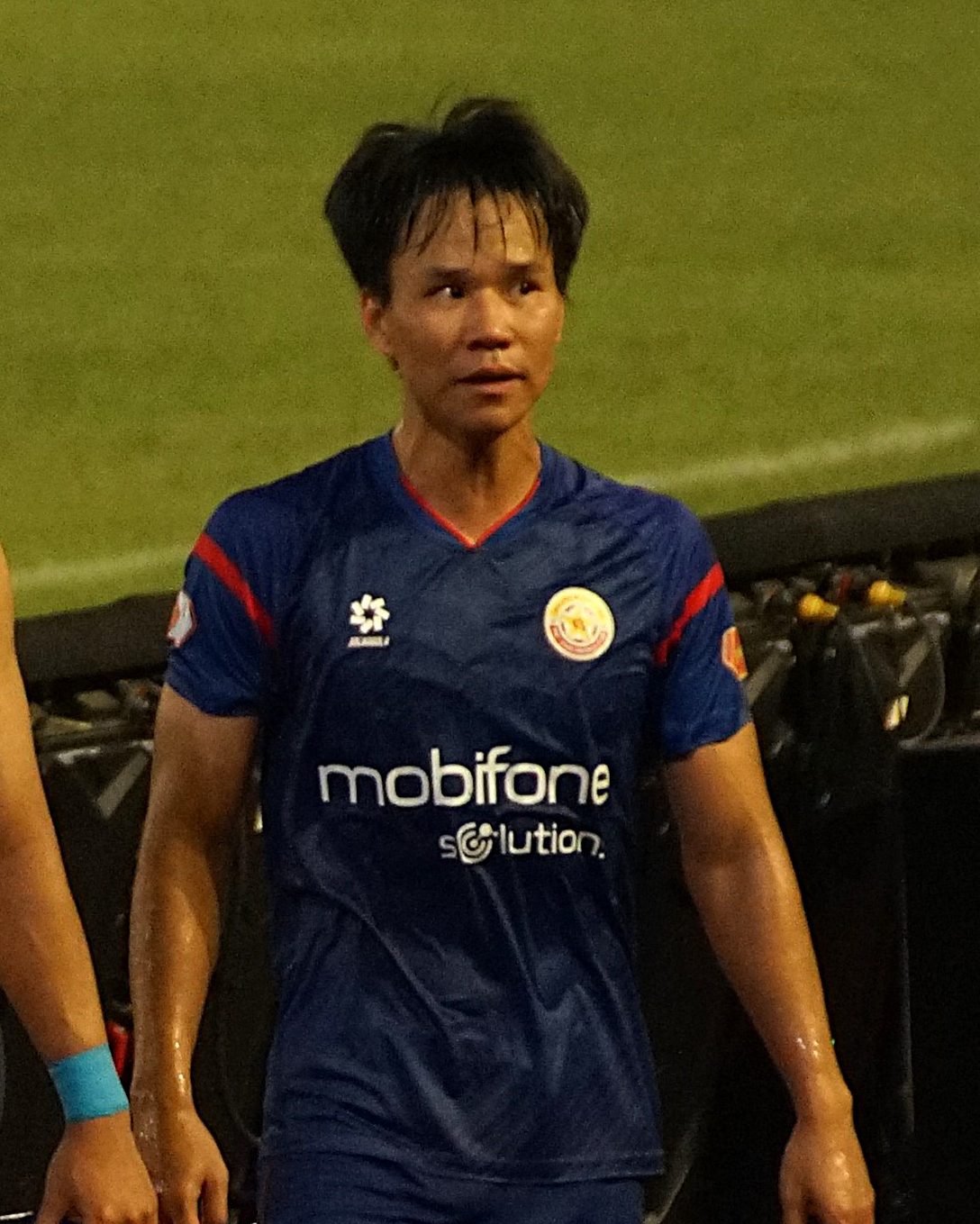
- Văn Dũng in 2026

Personal information
- Full name: Nguyễn Văn Dũng
- Date of birth: April 14, 1994 (age 32)
- Place of birth: Quỳnh Phụ, Thái Bình, Vietnam
- Height: 1.80 m (5 ft 11 in)
- Position: Left-back

Team information
- Current team: Công An Nhân Dân
- Number: 94

Youth career
- 2006–2013: Hà Nội

Senior career*
Years	Team	Apps	(Gls)
2014–2025	Hà Nội	55	(4)
2016	→ Sài Gòn (loan)	8	(0)
2025–	Công An Nhân Dân	19	(1)

International career
2014–2015	Vietnam U21	1	(0)
- * Club domestic league appearances and goals as of 12 June 2026

Nguyễn Văn Dũng (born 14 April 1994) is a Vietnamese professional footballer who plays as a left-back for V.League 2 club Công An Nhân Dân.

== Club career ==
Văn Dũng joined V.League 1 club Sài Gòn on loan for the 2016 season.

== Honours ==
Hà Nội

- V.League 1: 2016, 2018, 2019, 2022
- Vietnamese National Cup: 2019, 2020; runner-up: 2015, 2016
- Vietnamese Super Cup: 2019, 2020, 2021; runner-up: 2014, 2016, 2017
