= Nguyễn Ngọc Nguyên =

Vietnamese footballer

Personal information
- Full name: Nguyễn Ngọc Nguyên
- Date of birth: July 7, 1987 (age 39)
- Place of birth: Krông Nô, Đắk Nông, Vietnam
- Height: 1.77 m (5 ft 10 in)
- Position: Defender

Youth career
- 2000–2010: SHB Đà Nẵng

Senior career*
Years	Team	Apps	(Gls)
2011–2013	SHB Đà Nẵng	31	(0)
2014–2018	Quảng Nam	70	(0)
- * Club domestic league appearances and goals as of 15 July 2018

Nguyễn Ngọc Nguyên (born 7 July 1987) is a Vietnamese footballer who plays as a defender for V-League club SHB Đà Nẵng F.C.

== Honours ==
=== Club ===
Quảng Nam

- V.League 1: 2017
