= Nguyễn Minh Phong =

Vietnamese footballer

Personal information
- Full name: Nguyễn Minh Phong
- Date of birth: 15 September 1986 (age 40)
- Place of birth: Con Cuông, Nghệ An, Vietnam
- Height: 1.81 m (5 ft 11 in)
- Position: Goalkeeper

Youth career
- 2006–2010: Hà Nội

Senior career*
Years	Team	Apps	(Gls)
2011–2012	Hà Nội	31	(0)
2013	Đồng Nai	11	(0)
2014–2015	Becamex Bình Dương	3	(0)
2016	Than Quảng Ninh	1	(0)
2016	FLC Thanh Hóa	5	(0)
2017–2019	QNK Quảng Nam	32	(0)
- * Club domestic league appearances and goals

Nguyễn Minh Phong (born 15 September 1986) is a Vietnamese footballer who plays as a goalkeeper for V-League (Vietnam) club QNK Quảng Nam F.C.
