= Surachet Ngamtip =

Thai footballer (born 1991)

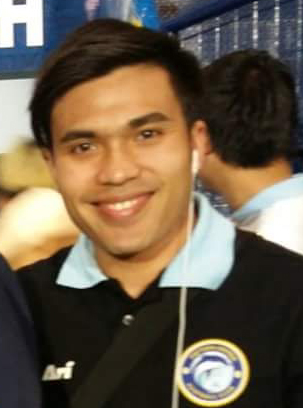

Personal information
- Full name: Surachet Ngamtip
- Date of birth: 1 February 1991 (age 35)
- Place of birth: Bangkok, Thailand
- Height: 1.73 m (5 ft 8 in)
- Position: Left-back

Youth career
- 2006–2007: Bangkok Glass

Senior career*
Years	Team	Apps	(Gls)
2008–2010	Bangkok Glass	7	(1)
2011–2017	Chainat Hornbill	106	(5)
2017	→ Pattaya United (loan)	17	(1)
2017–2020	Bangkok United	4	(1)
2018	→ Pattaya United (loan)	9	(0)
Total		143	(8)

International career
2009–2010	Thailand U19	16	(2)
2010	Thailand U23	2	(0)
2010–2013	Thailand	3	(0)
Medal record
Thailand under-19
AFF U-19 Youth Championship
Winner	AFF U-19 Youth Championship 2009	Football
- * Club domestic league appearances and goals as of 02:00, 1 December 2017 (UTC)

Surachet Ngamtip (Thai: สุรเชษฐ์ งามทิพย์, born February 1, 1991), simply known as Draft (Thai: ดราฟท์), is a Thai retired professional footballer who played as a left-back.

== International career ==
He debuted for U-19 team in 2010 AFC U-19 Championship. Surachet was called up to the national team by Bryan Robson. In 2013, he was called up to the national team by Surachai Jaturapattarapong to the 2015 AFC Asian Cup qualification. In October, 2013 he played a friendly match against Bahrain. In October 15, 2013 he played against Iran in the 2015 AFC Asian Cup qualification.

=== International ===
As of 12 November 2015

National team	Year	Apps	Goals
Thailand	2010	1	0
Thailand	2013	2	0
Thailand	Total	3	0

=== International goals ===
==== Under-19 ====
#	Date	Venue	Opponent	Score	Result	Competition
1.	6 August 2009	Thống Nhất Stadium, Ho Chi Minh City, Vietnam	Australia	1–1	1–1	2009 AFF U-19 Youth Championship
2.	10 August 2009	Thanh Long Stadium, Ho Chi Minh City, Vietnam	Malaysia	1–0	1–0	2009 AFF U-19 Youth Championship

== Honours ==
=== International ===
Thailand U-19

- AFF U-19 Youth Championship: 2009
