= Hồ Văn Thuận =

Vietnamese footballer (born 1985)

Personal information
- Full name: Hồ Văn Thuận
- Date of birth: 14 July 1985 (age 41)
- Place of birth: Đắk Đoa, Gia Lai, Vietnam
- Height: 1.60 m (5 ft 3 in)
- Position: Midfielder

Youth career
- 2001–2005: HAGL – Arsenal JMG Academy

Senior career*
| Years | Team | Apps | (Gls) |
| 2006–2011 | Hoàng Anh Gia Lai | 74 | (14) |
| 2012 | Khatoco Khánh Hoà | 19 | (0) |
| 2013–2014 | Hải Phòng | 19 | (2) |
| 2013 | → Cần Thơ (loan) | 2 | (0) |
| 2015–2017 | Quảng Nam | 36 | (4) |
- * Club domestic league appearances and goals

Hồ Văn Thuận (born 14 July 1985) is a Vietnamese former footballer who is last known to have played as a midfielder for Quảng Nam.

== Career ==
Before the 2015 season, Hồ signed for Vietnamese side Quang Nam, where he made 36 league appearances and scored 4 goals, helping them win their only league title. On 4 January 2015, he debuted for Quang Nam during a 0-0 draw with Cần Thơ. On 25 January 2015, Hồ scored his first 2 goals for Quang Nam during a 3-1 win over Đồng Nai.
