= 2018 Suwon JS Cup =

Friendly football tournament

Tournament details
- Host country: South Korea
- City: Suwon
- Dates: 18 April 2018– 22 April 2018
- Teams: 4 (from 3 confederations)
- Venue(s): 1 (in 1 host city)

The 2018 Suwon JS Cup is an international football friendly tournament. The tournament was used to prepare the host organisers for the 2018 AFC U-19 Championship in South Korea.

Pos	Team	Pld	W	D	L	GF	GA	GD	Pts
1	Mexico (C)	3	2	1	0	9	3	+6	7
2	Morocco	3	1	1	1	3	3	0	4
3	South Korea (H)	3	1	1	1	3	5	−2	4
4	Vietnam	3	0	2	1	2	6	−4	2

(C) Champions; (H) Hosts
18 April 2018

Vietnam	0–4	Mexico

Suwon World Cup Stadium
18 April 2018

South Korea	1–0	Morocco

Suwon World Cup Stadium

20 April 2018

South Korea	1–4	Mexico

Suwon World Cup Stadium
20 April 2018

Morocco	1–1	Vietnam
		Nguyễn Hồng Sơn 30'

Suwon World Cup Stadium

22 April 2018

Mexico	1–2	Morocco

Suwon World Cup Stadium
22 April 2018

South Korea	1–1	Vietnam
		Nhâm Mạnh Dũng 37'

Suwon World Cup Stadium
