= Ian Mai =

American soccer player

Personal information
- Full name: Thoan Jacob Ian Mai
- Date of birth: November 9, 2004 (age 22)
- Place of birth: Newport Beach, California, United States
- Height: 1.78 m (5 ft 10 in)
- Position: Right-back

Team information
- Current team: Hồng Lĩnh Hà Tĩnh
- Number: 22

Youth career
- 2016–2017: Los Angeles FC
- 2017–2018: LA Galaxy
- 2018–2021: San Diego Surf

Senior career*
Years	Team	Apps	(Gls)
2021–2022	San Diego Loyal	5	(0)
2024–2026	Ordino	16	(0)
2026–	Hồng Lĩnh Hà Tĩnh	0	(0)
- * Club domestic league appearances and goals as of 18 May 2025

Thoan Jacob Ian Mai (born November 9, 2004) is an American professional soccer player who plays as a right-back for V.League 1 club Hồng Lĩnh Hà Tĩnh.

== Career ==
=== Youth ===
Born in California, Mai spent time among various academy teams in the area including Los Angeles FC, LA Galaxy, San Diego Surf.

=== San Diego Loyal ===
Ahead of the 2021 season, Mai signed an academy contract with USL Championship club San Diego Loyal following a successful trial. The academy contract would allow Mai to remain eligible to play college soccer.

On August 14, 2021, Mai made his professional debut for San Diego Loyal against Tacoma Defiance, coming on as an 81st-minute substitute in the 2–1 defeat.

== Career statistics ==
As of match played May 18, 2025

Appearances and goals by club, season and competition
Club	Season	League			National Cup		Continental		Total	
Club	Season	Division	Apps	Goals	Apps	Goals	Apps	Goals	Apps	Goals
San Diego Loyal	2021	USL Championship	5	0	0	0	—		5	0
Ordino	2024–25	Primera Divisió	14	0	0	0	—		14	0
Hồng Lĩnh Hà Tĩnh	2026–27	V.League 1	0	0	0	0	—		0	0
Career total			19	0	0	0	0	0	19	0
