= Nguyễn Hữu Phúc =

Vietnamese footballer

Personal information
- Full name: Nguyễn Hữu Phúc
- Date of birth: 20 December 1992 (age 33)
- Place of birth: Tam Dương, Vĩnh Phúc, Vietnam
- Height: 1.76 m (5 ft 9 in)
- Position: Midfielder

Youth career
- 2006–2012: Hà Nội T&T

Senior career*
Years	Team	Apps	(Gls)
2013–2014	Hà Nội	1	(0)
2014–2015	QNK Quảng Nam	5	(1)
2016	Đồng Tháp	19	(3)
2016–2018	SHB Đà Nẵng	9	(1)
2018–2022	Hải Phòng	41	(0)
- * Club domestic league appearances and goals as of 23 October 2019

Nguyễn Hữu Phúc (born 20 December 1992) is a Vietnamese footballer who plays as a midfielder for V-League (Vietnam) club Hải Phòng.

Hữu Phúc made his debut for Da Nang on 18 January 2017 when he scored the equalizing goal against his former team Quang Nam in a 1–1 draw.
