= Hồ Phúc Tịnh =

Vietnamese footballer (born 1994)

Personal information
- Full name: Hồ Phúc Tịnh
- Date of birth: April 28, 1994 (age 32)
- Place of birth: Quỳnh Lưu, Nghệ An, Vietnam
- Height: 1.76 m (5 ft 9 in)
- Position: Forward

Team information
- Current team: Sông Lam Nghệ An
- Number: 18

Youth career
- 2007–2014: Sông Lam Nghệ An

Senior career*
Years	Team	Apps	(Gls)
2015–	Sông Lam Nghệ An	78	(9)
- * Club domestic league appearances and goals as of 13 September 2018

Hồ Phúc Tịnh (born 28 April 1994) is a Vietnamese footballer who plays as a forward for V.League 1 club Sông Lam Nghệ An.
