= Phạm Thế Nhật =

Vietnamese footballer

Personal information
- Full name: Phạm Thế Nhật
- Date of birth: February 15, 1991 (age 35)
- Place of birth: Hưng Nguyên, Nghệ An, Vietnam
- Height: 1.72 m (5 ft 8 in)
- Position: Defender

Youth career
- 2003–2012: Sông Lam Nghệ An

Senior career*
Years	Team	Apps	(Gls)
2013–2022	Sông Lam Nghệ An	130	(0)
2015	→ XSKT Cần Thơ (loan)	12	(0)

International career
2013–2014	Vietnam U23	3	(0)
- * Club domestic league appearances and goals as of 7 July 2019

Phạm Thế Nhật (born 15 February 1991) is a Vietnamese footballer who plays as a defender for V.League 1 club Sông Lam Nghệ An and the Vietnam national football team.

== Career ==
Phạm Thế Nhật served as captain of the u-21 national team that played in a youth tournament in Malaysia, in which he was named the player of the tournament. In February 2017 in a cup match against Dak Lak, Phạm Thế Nhật punched and broke attacker Lê Trung Hiếu's nose during an off the ball altercation in the 87th minute. The referee did not see the incident but after the match, Phạm Thế Nhật was heavily fined and suspended by the VFN.

== Personal life ==
Phạm Thế Nhật was born in Hưng Nguyên. He is married to Vietnamese model and singer Trương Phương Thảo, then 24, whom he wed in December 2017.
