= Ngô Quang Huy (footballer) =

Vietnamese footballer

Personal information
- Full name: Ngô Quang Huy
- Date of birth: 28 November 1990 (age 35)
- Place of birth: An Nhơn, Bình Định, Vietnam
- Height: 1.70 m (5 ft 7 in)
- Position: Attacking midfielder

Youth career
- 2004–2013: SHB Đà Nẵng

Senior career*
Years	Team	Apps	(Gls)
2014–2018	SHB Đà Nẵng	28	(1)
2018–2022	Quảng Nam	52	(3)
- * Club domestic league appearances and goals as of 15 July 2018

Ngô Quang Huy (born 28 November 1990) is a Vietnamese footballer who plays as an attacking midfielder for V-League club Quảng Nam.
