= 2015 Vietnamese National U-17 Football Championship =

2015 National U17 Football Championship
Giải bóng đá U17 Quốc gia Báo Bóng Đá – Cúp Thái Sơn Nam 2015

Tournament details
- Dates: 30 June - 9 July 2015
- Teams: 8
- Venue(s): 2 (in 1 host city)

Final positions
- Champions: PVF (2nd title)
- Runners-up: Viettel
- Third place: Sông Lam Nghệ An; Quảng Ngãi

Tournament statistics
- Top scorer(s): Phạm Trọng Hóa; Đỗ Thanh Thịnh
- Best player(s): Bùi Tiến Dụng
- Best goalkeeper: Phan Văn Biểu
- Fair play award: Sông Lam Nghệ An

The 2015 Vietnamese National U17 Football Championship is the 12th edition of the Vietnamese National U17 Football Championship, the annual youth football tournament organised by the Vietnam Football Federation (VFF) for male players under-17

== Qualification ==
U17 Kien Giang and U17 Phu Yen withdrew before the championship start.

=== Qualified teams ===
Team	Qualified as
TP Hồ Chí Minh	Hosts
Viettel	Group A Winner
Sông Lam Nghệ An	Group B Winner
Sanatech Khánh Hòa	Group C Winner
Quảng Ngãi	Group C Runner-up
PVF	Group D Winner
Đồng Tháp	Group E Winner
An Giang	Group E Runner-up

== Venue ==
Two football stadiums were hosted matches of the football competition:

Ho Chi Minh City
Thống Nhất Stadium	District 8 Stadium
Capacity: 25,000	Capacity: n/a
Thống Nhất Stadium	Quận 8 Stadium

== Group stage ==
=== Group A ===
Team	Pld	W	D	L	GF	GA	GD	Pts
Viettel	3	2	1	0	5	1	+4	7
Quảng Ngãi	3	2	1	0	2	0	+2	7
Pelimex Đồng Tháp	3	1	0	2	4	5	−1	3
TP Hồ Chí Minh	3	0	0	3	1	6	−5	0

30 June 2015
15:00

TP Hồ Chí Minh	1-3	Đồng Tháp
Tống Văn Quân 50'	Report	Bạch Hồng Hân 20', 75'; Đặng Văn Danh 59'

Thống Nhất Stadium
Attendance: 1,500
Referee: Khổng Tam Cường (Vietnam)
30 June 2015
17:00

Quảng Ngãi	0-0	Viettel
	Report

Thống Nhất Stadium
Attendance: 1,500
Referee: Trương Phi (Vietnam)

2 July 2015
15:00

Petimex Đồng Tháp	0-1	Quảng Ngãi
	Report	Phù Trung Phong 52'

Thống Nhất Stadium
Attendance: 500
Referee: Khổng Tam Cường (Vietnam)
2 July 2015
17:00

Viettel	2-0	TP Hồ Chí Minh
Nguyễn Văn Huy 45+1'; Bùi Quý Trường 71'	Report

Thống Nhất Stadium
Referee: Lê Đức Thuận (Vietnam)

4 July 2015
15:00

TP Hồ Chí Minh	0-1	Quảng Ngãi
	Report	Đinh Văn Trâm 16'

Thống Nhất Stadium
Attendance: 700
Referee: Lê Đức Thuận (Vietnam)
4 July 2015
15:00

Petimex Đồng Tháp	1-3	Viettel
Đặng Văn Danh 76'	Report	Nguyễn Trung Học 69', 86'; Vũ Văn Dũng 78'

District 8 Stadium
Attendance: 800
Referee: Trần Quốc Thịnh (Vietnam)

=== Group B ===
Team	Pld	W	D	L	GF	GA	GD	Pts
PVF	3	3	0	0	17	0	+17	9
Sông Lam Nghệ An	3	2	0	1	2	2	0	6
Sanatech Khánh Hòa	3	0	1	2	2	8	−6	1
An Giang	3	0	1	2	2	13	−11	1

1 July 2015
15:00

Sanatech Khánh Hòa	0-5	PVF
	Report	Hồ Minh Dĩ 23'; Phạm Trọng Hòa 36', 49'; Nguyễn Đình Bảo 53'; Lê Văn Xuân 82'

Thống Nhất Stadium
Referee: Trần Ngọc Nhớ (Vietnam)
1 July 2015
17:00

An Giang	0-1	Sông Lam Nghệ An
	Report	Nguyễn Văn Đức 57'

Thống Nhất Stadium
Referee: Trần Quốc Thịnh (Vietnam)

3 July 2015
15:00

PVF	10-0	An Giang
: Phạm Trọng Hóa 1', 50'; Lâm Thuận 17', 71'; Đỗ Thanh Thịnh 20', 23', 47', 65', 77'; Nguyễn Hữu Kiên 69'	Report

Thống Nhất Stadium
Attendance: 1,200
Referee: Trương Phi (Vietnam)
3 July 2015
17:00

Sông Lam Nghệ An	1-0	Sanatech Khánh Hòa
Nguyễn Văn Việt 36'	Report

Thống Nhất Stadium
Attendance: 700
Referee: Trần Ngọc Nhớ (Vietnam)

5 July 2015
15:00

Sanatech Khánh Hòa	2-2	An Giang
Nguyễn Đăng Hậu 65'; Nguyễn Tấn Việt 71'	Report	Lương Thanh Sang 32'; Đỗ Nhật Linh 87'

Thống Nhất Stadium
Attendance: 300
Referee: Trương Phi (Vietnam)
5 July 2015
15:00

PVF	2-0	Sông Lam Nghệ An
Nguyễn Hữu Kiên 39'; Lê Xuân Tú 53'	Report

District 8 Stadium
Attendance: 700
Referee: Khổng Tam Cường (Vietnam)

== Knockout stage ==
=== Semi-finals ===
7 July 2015
14:30

Viettel	3-0	Sông Lam Nghệ An
Nguyễn Hoàng Đức 45+2'; Trần Văn Bửu 86'; Trần Văn Trung 87'	Report

Thống Nhất Stadium
Attendance: 1000
Referee: Trần Quốc Thịnh
7 July 2015
16:30

PVF	3-0	Quảng Ngãi
Phạm Trọng Hóa 32'; Lâm Thuận 83'; Trần Văn Hòa 90'	Report

Thống Nhất Stadium
Attendance: 3500
Referee: Khổng Tam Cường

=== Final ===
9 July 2015
14:15

Viettel	0-0	PVF
	Report
Penalties
	3-4

Thống Nhất Stadium
Attendance: 5000
Referee: Trần Ngọc Nhớ
