= Nguyễn Thanh Tùng (footballer) =

Vietnamese footballer (born 1998)

Personal information
- Full name: Nguyễn Thanh Tùng
- Date of birth: 23 June 1998 (age 28)
- Place of birth: Bắc Giang, Vietnam
- Height: 1.84 m (6 ft 0 in)
- Position: Goalkeeper

Team information
- Current team: Hồng Lĩnh Hà Tĩnh
- Number: 1

Youth career
- 2009–2012: Bắc Ninh University of Physical Education and Sports
- 2009–2018: Viettel

Senior career*
Years	Team	Apps	(Gls)
2018–2020	Viettel	0	(0)
2020	→ Phố Hiến (loan)	5	(0)
2021–2022	Đồng Tháp		
2022–	Hồng Lĩnh Hà Tĩnh	82	(0)

International career
2013	Vietnam U16	6	(0)
- * Club domestic league appearances and goals as of 7 June 2026

Nguyễn Thanh Tùng (born 23 June 1998) is a Vietnamese professional footballer who plays as a goalkeeper for V.League 1 club Hồng Lĩnh Hà Tĩnh.

== Early career ==
Thanh Tùng began his career at the football team of Bắc Ninh University Of Physical Education and Sports. In 2012, he joined the Viettel youth academy. After his father died in 2013, he considered quitting football but was convinced by his coaches to stay.

== Club career ==
Thanh Tùng was promoted to Viettel's first team in 2018 as the third choice goalkeeper. In search for game time, he joined V.League 2 club Phố Hiến for the 2020 season, where he made his professional debut. He then signed for Vietnamese Second Division team Đồng Tháp on a permanent deal.

Ahead of the 2023 season, Thanh Tùng joined Hồng Lĩnh Hà Tĩnh. Being a back-up goalkeeper, he quickly gained the starting spot after the injury of first choice goalkeeper Dương Quang Tuấn. In the 2024–25 V.League 1, Thanh Tùng kept the second most clean sheets in the league.

== International career ==
Thanh Tùng was the main goalkeeper of Vietnam U16 at the 2013 AFF U-16 Youth Championship, finishing fourth with team.

== Honours ==
Viettel

- V.League 2: 2018
