= Trương Công Thảo =

Vietnamese footballer

Personal information
- Full name: Trương Công Thảo
- Date of birth: 11 October 1988 (age 38)
- Place of birth: Nghĩa Đàn, Nghệ An, Vietnam
- Height: 1.66 m (5 ft 5 in)
- Position: Striker

Youth career
- 2007–2011: Vissai Ninh Bình

Senior career*
Years	Team	Apps	(Gls)
2011–2012	Vissai Ninh Bình	13	(0)
2015	XSKT Cần Thơ	18	(1)
2016–2017	Sài Gòn	27	(5)
2018–2019	Sanna Khánh Hòa BVN	2	(0)
2019–2021	Phù Đổng	32	(0)
- * Club domestic league appearances and goals as of 28 March 2018

Trương Công Thảo (born 11 October 1988) is a Vietnamese footballer who plays as a striker for V.League 2 club Phù Đổng.
