= Nguyễn Thanh Diệp =

Vietnamese footballer

Personal information
- Full name: Nguyễn Thanh Diệp
- Date of birth: 6 September 1991 (age 35)
- Place of birth: Định Quán, Đồng Nai, Vietnam
- Height: 1.78 m (5 ft 10 in)
- Position: Goalkeeper

Team information
- Current team: Đông Á Thanh Hóa
- Number: 25

Youth career
- 2009–2013: Đồng Nai
- 2012: → Ninh Thuận (loan)

Senior career*
Years	Team	Apps	(Gls)
2013–2016	Đồng Nai	43	(0)
2016–2018	Cần Thơ	14	(0)
2018–2019	Hồ Chí Minh City	24	(0)
2019–	Thanh Hóa	56	(0)

International career
2010–2011	Vietnam U20	25	(0)
2012–2013	Vietnam U22	20	(0)
2015	Vietnam	1	(0)
- * Club domestic league appearances and goals as of 3 June 2018

Nguyễn Thanh Diệp (born 6 September 1991) is a Vietnamese footballer who plays as a goalkeeper for V.League 1 club Đông Á Thanh Hóa

== Honours ==
Đông Á Thanh Hóa

- Vietnamese National Cup:

(bronze) Third place : 2022
(gold) Champion : 2023, 2023–24
