= Nguyễn Lê Phát =

Vietnamese footballer (born 2007)

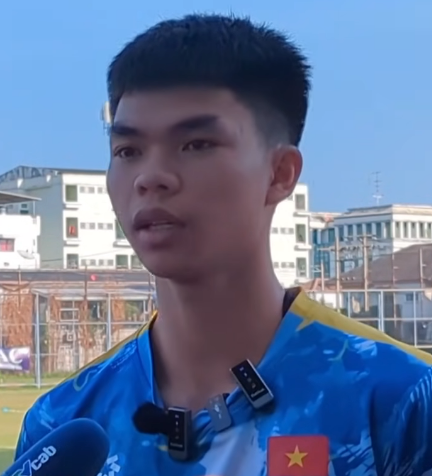
- Lê Phát in 2025

Personal information
- Full name: Nguyễn Lê Phát
- Date of birth: 12 January 2007 (age 19)
- Place of birth: Tuy Đức, Đắk Nông, Vietnam
- Height: 1.75 m (5 ft 9 in)
- Positions: Winger; forward

Team information
- Current team: Ninh Bình (on loan from PVF)
- Number: 16

Youth career
- 2017–2024: PVF
- 2023: → Deinze (loan)

Senior career*
Years	Team	Apps	(Gls)
2023–	PVF	?	(2)
2025	→ PVF-CAND B (loan)	?	(0)
2025–	→ Ninh Bình (loan)	16	(4)

International career^{‡}
2022–2023	Vietnam U17	7	(2)
2024–2026	Vietnam U20	6	(1)
2025–	Vietnam U23	14	(3)
Medal record
Men's football
Representing Vietnam
AFC U-23 Asian Cup
Third place	Saudi Arabia 2026
- * Club domestic league appearances and goals as of 8 November 2026 ‡ National team caps and goals as of 25 September 2026

Nguyễn Lê Phát (born 12 January 2007) is a Vietnamese professional footballer who plays as a winger or a forward for V.League 1 club Ninh Bình, on loan from PVF and the Vietnam national under-23 team.

== Early career ==
Born in Đắk Nông, Lê Phát was admitted to the PVF at the age of 9 after getting being by the team scouts during a player recruitment in Cần Thơ. At PVF, he became a key player at several youth categories, helping his team achieve good results in Vietnamese youth tournaments. In January 2023, Lê Phát was invited by Belgian side Deinze to train with the club during a period of three months.

== Club career ==
In 2023, Lê Phát was included in PVF's squad to participate in the Vietnamese Second Division.

On 30 July 2025, Lê Phát signed for V.League 1 side Ninh Bình on a loan deal from PVF.

== International career ==
Lê Phát gained Vietnamese media attention after his performances 2023 AFC U-17 Asian Cup qualification. Being the youngest member in the team, he scored 2 goals against Chinese Taipei. He later featured in the final tournament, featuring in all three group stage matches as Vietnam U17 failed to reach the knockout stage.

In November 2026, Lê Phát received his first call-up to the Vietnam national team, being named in the squad for the friendly tournament Casper Cup, however withdrew through injury.

== Career statistics ==
=== Club ===
As of match played 8 November 2026

Appearances and goals by club, season and competition
Club	Season	League			Cup		Continental		Other		Total	
Club	Season	Division	Apps	Goals	Apps	Goals	Apps	Goals	Apps	Goals	Apps	Goals
Ninh Bình	2025–26	V.League 1	9	0	2	0	—		—		11	0
Ninh Bình	2026–27	V.League 1	7	4	0	0	—		—		7	4
Total career			16	4	2	0	0	0	0	0	18	4

== Playing style ==
Lê Phát is a versatile player, being able to operate as a winger, a striker and also as an attacking midfielder thanks to his playmaking abilities. He is given the nickname "Vietnamese Mbappé" due to physical and playing style resemblances.

== Honours ==
Vietnam U23

- SEA Games gold medal: 2025
- AFC U-23 Asian Cup third place: 2026
