= Hà Minh Tuấn =

Vietnamese footballer (born 1991)

Personal information
- Full name: Hà Minh Tuấn
- Date of birth: 1 January 1991 (age 35)
- Place of birth: Đại Lộc, Quảng Nam, Vietnam
- Height: 1.81 m (5 ft 11 in)
- Position: Forward

Youth career
- 2006–2009: SHB Đà Nẵng

Senior career*
Years	Team	Apps	(Gls)
2010–2015	SHB Đà Nẵng	24	(3)
2015–2022	Quảng Nam	130	(28)
2023–2025	SHB Đà Nẵng	47	(6)
Total		201	(37)

International career
2009–2010	Vietnam U19	3	(0)
2011–2014	Vietnam U23	19	(0)
- * Club domestic league appearances and goals

Hà Minh Tuấn (born 1 January 1991) is a Vietnamese former footballer who last played for SHB Đà Nẵng.

Hà Minh Tuấn was dubbed by the Vietnamese media as the successor of the former Vietnamese star striker Lê Huỳnh Đức for both his physique and playing style. Lê Huỳnh Đức was once Tuấn's coach at SHB Đà Nẵng.

Hà Minh Tuấn was a part of the SHB Đà Nẵng team that played in the 2013 AFC Cup; he made 5 appearances and scored 1 goal against Ayeyawady United F.C. In the 2024–25 V.League 1, he scored a goal in the relegation play-off game against Bình Phước to help SHB Đà Nẵng maintain in the Vietnamese top-flight. He announced his retirement after the game.

== Honours ==
Quảng Nam

- V.League 1: 2017

SHB Đà Nẵng

- V.League 2: 2023–24
