= Nhâm Mạnh Dũng =

Vietnamese footballer

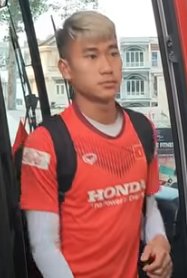
- Nhâm Mạnh Dũng in 2019

Personal information
- Full name: Nhâm Mạnh Dũng
- Date of birth: 12 April 2000 (age 26)
- Place of birth: Đông Hưng, Thái Bình, Vietnam
- Height: 1.78 m (5 ft 10 in)
- Position: Striker

Team information
- Current team: Thể Công-Viettel
- Number: 23

Youth career
- 2008–2019: Viettel

Senior career*
Years	Team	Apps	(Gls)
2019–	Thể Công-Viettel	94	(11)

International career^{‡}
2015–2017	Vietnam U16	7	(0)
2018–2020	Vietnam U19	9	(1)
2020–2022	Vietnam U23	21	(2)
2022–	Vietnam	2	(0)
Medal record
Men's football
Representing Vietnam
SEA Games
Gold medal – first place	Hanoi 2021	Team
- * Club domestic league appearances and goals as of 11 May 2025 ‡ National team caps and goals as of 6 May 2022

Nhâm Mạnh Dũng (born 12 April 2000) is a Vietnamese professional footballer who plays as a striker for V.League 1 club Thể Công-Viettel.

A versatile player, he can be deployed as a forward or a centre back. Once Mạnh Dũng even played as a goalkeeper for Vietnam U23, when the team's usual starting goalkeeper was sent off.

== International career ==
=== Youth ===
With the Vietnam under-23s, Nhâm Mạnh Dũng participated in the 2021 Southeast Asian Games. In this competition, he played five matches, scoring the only goal in the final to help defeat rivals Thailand.

=== Senior ===
Nhâm Mạnh Dũng made his senior international debut in a friendly against Singapore on 21 September 2022.

== Career statistics ==
=== Club ===
As of match played 4 April 2024

Appearances and goals by club, season and competition
Club	Season	League			Cup		Asia		Other		Total	
Club	Season	Division	Apps	Goals	Apps	Goals	Apps	Goals	Apps	Goals	Apps	Goals
Viettel	2019	V.League 1	2	0	0	0	—		—		2	0
Viettel	2020	V.League 1	2	0	4	1	—		—		6	1
Viettel	2021	V.League 1	3	0	0	0	4 (Note: Appearances in AFC Champions League)	0	0	0	7	0
Viettel	2022	V.League 1	14	2	2	2	4 (Note: Appearances in AFC Cup)	1	—		20	5
Viettel	2023	V.League 1	20	2	5	3	—		—		25	5
Viettel	2023–24	V.League 1	13	1	0	0	—		—		13	1
Total career			54	5	11	6	8	1	0	0	73	12

=== International ===
As of match played 21 September 2022

National team	Years	Apps	Goals
Vietnam	2022	1	0
Total		1	0

=== International goals ===
Vietnam U19

No.	Date	Venue	Opponent	Score	Result	Competition
1.	22 April 2018	Suwon World Cup Stadium, Suwon, South Korea	South Korea	1–0	1–1	2018 Suwon JS Cup

Vietnam U23

No.	Date	Venue	Opponent	Score	Result	Competition
1.	21 May 2022	Mỹ Đình National Stadium, Hanoi, Vietnam	Thailand	1–0	1–0	2021 Southeast Asian Games
2.	8 June 2022	Lokomotiv Stadium, Tashkent, Uzbekistan	Malaysia	1–0	2–0	2022 AFC U-23 Asian Cup

== Honours ==
Viettel

- V.League 1: 2020

Vietnam U23

- SEA Games gold medal: 2021

Vietnam

- VFF Cup: 2022

== Filmography ==
=== Television ===
Year	Title	Role	Notes	Ref.
2023	Gia đình mình vui bất thình lình	Nhâm Văn Thìn	Television series; 1 episode	
