= Nguyễn Đình Bảo =

Vietnamese footballer

Personal information
- Full name: Nguyễn Đình Bảo
- Date of birth: 19 May 1991 (age 35)
- Place of birth: Thanh Chương, Nghệ An, Vietnam
- Height: 1.70 m (5 ft 7 in)
- Position: Forward

Team information
- Current team: Quảng Nam
- Number: 27

Youth career
- 2006–2013: Sông Lam Nghệ An

Senior career*
Years	Team	Apps	(Gls)
2014–2015	Sông Lam Nghệ An	20	(0)
2015–2018	Hải Phòng	77	(19)
2019–2020	Sài Gòn	10	(0)
2020	Thanh Hóa	1	(0)
2021–	Quảng Nam	8	(1)
- * Club domestic league appearances and goals as of 16 June 2019

Nguyễn Đình Bảo (born 19 May 1991) is a Vietnamese footballer who plays as a forward for Quảng Nam.
