= Hong Linh Ha Tinh FC =

Vietnamese football club

Hong Linh Ha Tinh
- Full name: Hong Linh Ha Tinh Football Club
- Nicknames: Sao la (The Pseudoryx); Đội Bóng Núi Hồng
- Short name: HLHT
- Founded: 19 January 2019; 7 years ago
- Ground: Hà Tĩnh Stadium
- Capacity: 30,000
- Owner: Hoành Sơn Group
- Chairman: Nguyễn Tiến Dũng
- Manager: Nguyễn Công Mạnh
- League: V.League 1
- 2025–26: V.League 1, 8th of 14
- Website: honglinhhatinh-fc.com
Home colours	Away colours	Third colours

Hong Linh Ha Tinh Football Club (Vietnamese: Câu lạc bộ bóng đá Hồng Lĩnh Hà Tĩnh), simply known as HLHT or Ha Tinh, is a Vietnamese professional football club which is based in Hà Tĩnh. The club currently competes in the V.League 1, the top tier of Vietnamese football.

The club is named after the Hồng Lĩnh mountain in the province, and also to match with the name of "rival" Song Lam Nghe An, who used Lam River as part of their name.

== History ==
Hồng Lĩnh Hà Tĩnh was founded on 12 January 2019 after the relocation of Hà Nội B to Hà Tĩnh, thus becoming the only professional club in the province. On 30 August 2019, the club secured the V.League 2 and subsequently promotion to the V.League 1 for the 2020 season, for the first time in their history. Hồng Lĩnh Hà Tĩnh managed to finish in eighth place in their debut season in the top tier.

== Stadium ==
Since 2020 season, Hong Linh Ha Tinh plays at Hà Tĩnh Stadium in Hà Tĩnh province. The stadium provides 30,000 seats to its spectators.

== Kit suppliers and shirt sponsors ==
Period	Kit manufacturer	Shirt sponsor
2020–2022	(Spain) Kelme	Caslaquartz
2022–present	(Thailand) Grand Sport	Bia Nghe Tinh Bia Sao Vang

== Players ==
=== Current squad ===
As of 7 October 2026

Note: Flags indicate national team as defined under FIFA eligibility rules; some limited exceptions apply. Players may hold more than one non-FIFA nationality.

No.	Pos.	Nation	Player
1	GK	VIE	Nguyễn Thanh Tùng
2	DF	VIE	Nguyễn Văn Huy
3	DF	VIE	Thái Bá Sang
4	DF	VIE	Lê Quang Trường
5	DF	VIE	Vũ Viết Triều
7	DF	VIE	Bùi Duy Thường
8	MF	VIE	Nguyễn Trọng Hoàng (captain)
9	FW	BRA	Daniel Passira
11	MF	VIE	Nguyễn Văn Hiệp
12	DF	BRA	Helerson
16	MF	VIE	Phạm Văn Long
17	MF	VIE	Trần Văn Bửu
18	FW	VIE	Vũ Quang Nam
19	FW	VIE	Ngô Văn Lương

No.	Pos.	Nation	Player
20	MF	VIE	Huỳnh Tiến Đạt
22	DF	USA	Ian Mai
24	MF	VIE	Nguyễn Hoàng Trung Nguyên
25	GK	VIE	Trần Văn Tiến
26	MF	VIE	Bùi Văn Đức
30	GK	VIE	Nguyễn Hữu Hậu
33	MF	FRA	Ranhi Moreau Nguyen
38	DF	VIE	Võ Quốc Dân
39	MF	VIE	Huỳnh Tấn Tài
68	DF	VIE	Vương Văn Huy
87	MF	VIE	Nguyễn Văn Khánh
88	MF	BRA	Luiz Antônio
90	FW	NGR	Charles Atshimene
99	GK	VIE	Lê Trung Tuyến (on loan from Sông Lam Nghệ An)

=== Other players under contract ===
Note: Flags indicate national team as defined under FIFA eligibility rules; some limited exceptions apply. Players may hold more than one non-FIFA nationality.

No.	Pos.	Nation	Player
—	MF	VIE	Nguyễn Huy Hoàng Phú
—	MF	VIE	Trịnh Trần Thái Bảo

=== Notable players ===
The following players had international caps for their respective countries. Players whose name is listed in bold appeared for their countries while playing for Hong Linh Ha Tinh.

- (Republic of the Congo) **Prince Ibara**
- (Nigeria) Charles Atshimene
- (Vietnam) Bùi Hoàng Việt Anh
- (Vietnam) Đinh Thanh Trung
- (Vietnam) Lê Tấn Tài
- (Vietnam) Lê Văn Xuân
- (Vietnam) Lương Xuân Trường
- (Vietnam) Nguyễn Trọng Hoàng
- (Vietnam) Nguyễn Văn Vĩ
- (Vietnam) Nguyễn Xuân Hùng
- (Vietnam) **Phạm Tuấn Hải**
- (Vietnam) Trần Phi Sơn

== Coaching staff ==
Position	Name
Head coach	(Vietnam) Phan Như Thuật
Assistant coach	(Vietnam) Nguyễn Thanh Thế (Vietnam) Nguyễn Văn Thịnh
Goalkeeping coach	(Vietnam) Đỗ Hoàng Dương
Fitness coach	(Morocco) Taoufik Harzi
Doctor	(Vietnam) Nguyễn Trung Kiên (Vietnam) Phạm Văn Hùng
Interpreter	(Vietnam) Lê Thái Sơn
Media officer	(Vietnam) Dương Đình Hiếu

== Managerial history ==
Name	Nat	Period	Honours
Phạm Minh Đức	(Vietnam)	2019–2021	(gold) 2019 V.League 2
Nguyễn Thành Công	(Vietnam)	2021–2025	
Nguyễn Công Mạnh	(Vietnam)	2025–present	

== Honours ==
Domestic

- V.League 2
  - Champions (1): 2019

== Domestic records ==
Season	League	Pld	Won	Draw	Lost	GF	GA	GD	Pts	Final position	Notes
2019	V.League 2	20	19	1	0	40	3	+37	58	1st	Promoted to V.League 1
2020	V.League 1	20	4	8	8	19	24	-5	20	8th	
2021	V.League 1	12	4	3	5	16	17	-1	15	10th	The season was abandoned
2022	V.League 1	24	5	9	10	26	33	-7	24	11th	
2023	V.League 1	20	4	11	5	24	30	-6	23	8th	
2023–24	V.League 1	26	7	9	10	25	32	-7	30	13th	
2024–25	V.League 1	26	7	15	4	24	20	+4	36	5th	
2025–26	V.League 1	26	7	8	11	15	29	-14	29	8th	

== Reserves team ==
The reserves team of Hồng Lĩnh Hà Tĩnh currently competes at the 2026 Vietnamese Second Division.

As of 28 March 2026

Position	Name
Head coach	(Vietnam) Võ Hoàng
Assistant coach	(Vietnam) Nguyễn Ánh Cường (Vietnam) Nguyễn Tiến Hoàng
Doctor	(Vietnam) Nguyễn Văn Mai

=== Current players ===
Note: Flags indicate national team as defined under FIFA eligibility rules; some limited exceptions apply. Players may hold more than one non-FIFA nationality.

No.	Pos.	Nation	Player
1	GK	VIE	Nguyễn Đức Mạnh
2	DF	VIE	Nguyễn Viết Đức
3	MF	VIE	Nguyễn Hoàng Gia Bảo
4	DF	VIE	Lê Quang Trường
6	DF	VIE	Trần Gia Bảo
7	MF	VIE	Đặng Đình Chiến Thắng
8	DF	VIE	Trịnh Trần Thái Bảo
9	FW	VIE	Bùi Hải Sơn
10	MF	VIE	Nguyễn Huy Hoàng Phú
11	MF	VIE	Nguyễn Văn Đức
12	MF	VIE	Nguyễn Doãn Mạnh
15	FW	VIE	Đặng Đức Quang
16	MF	VIE	Lê Anh Tuấn
17	MF	VIE	Mai Viết Dũng
18	DF	VIE	Phan Bảo Huy

No.	Pos.	Nation	Player
19	MF	VIE	Nguyễn Bảo Nam
20	DF	VIE	Nguyễn Hữu Tâm
21	DF	VIE	Mai Quốc Phong
22	MF	VIE	Nguyễn Văn Duẫn
23	MF	VIE	Hà Công Nam Khánh
23	MF	VIE	Hoàng Trọng Sơn
25	GK	VIE	Lê Quang Minh
26	GK	VIE	Nguyễn Quyêt Thắng
27	FW	VIE	Trần Thanh Bình
28	FW	VIE	Hoàng Đức Nam
29	DF	VIE	Võ Bảo Long
30	DF	VIE	Nguyễn Quang Lê
31	GK	VIE	Nguyễn Phương Nam
38	DF	VIE	Nguyễn Văn Phúc
