= Quang Nam FC =

Vietnamese football club

Quảng Nam
- Full name: Quảng Nam Football Club
- Nicknames: Đội bóng xứ Quảng (The club from the land of Quảng); Đại bàng thành Quảng (Eagle of Quảng castle)
- Short name: QNFC
- Founded: 1997; 29 years ago
- Dissolved: 1 August 2025; 15 months ago
- Ground: Tam Kỳ Stadium
- Capacity: 16,700

Quảng Nam Football Club (Vietnamese: Câu lạc bộ Bóng đá Quảng Nam), was a professional football club, based in Tam Kỳ, Quảng Nam province (currently Tam Kỳ ward, Đà Nẵng). Their best achievement is winning the V.League 1 in 2017.

The team played at the 16,700 capacity Tam Kỳ Stadium.

== History ==
Quảng Nam Football Club was founded from the Công Nhân Quảng Nam - Đà Nẵng football team. After the separation of the provinces in 1997, the Quảng Nam football team was established separately. After many ups and downs, in 2013, the team won the national first division championship and was promoted to the 2014 V.League 1. In the 2017 season, the team made history by winning its first national championship. However, due to not meeting the criteria of the AFC, Quảng Nam FC gave up the place to attend the AFC Cup 2018 to FLC Thanh Hóa.

On 26 December 2011, the club was renamed QNK Quảng Nam after being sponsored by QNK Investment Joint Stock Company. On 29 December 2016, the team officially changed its name to Quảng Nam Football Club as it is known today. On 25 November 2017, in the last round of V-League 2017, Quảng Nam FC won 3–1 against Ho Chi Minh FC at Tam Kỳ home stadium.

In the National Cup, Quảng Nam were semi-finalists twice in 2016 and 2017, finished as runner-up in 2019, and won the Vietnamese Super Cup in 2017. In 2020, after an unsuccessful season, Quảng Nam was forced to play in the 2021 V.League 2. According to the team development plan, Quảng Nam must return to the professional league within 3 years, the earliest being in 2021.

In 2023, the club won the 2023 V.League 2 championship by surpassing PVF-CAND on goal difference and was promoted to 2023–24 V.League 1.

== Kit manufacturers and shirt sponsors ==
Period	Kit manufacturer	Shirt sponsor
2017–2021	(Japan) Jogarbola	LS Group; DatQuang Group
2021–2022	(Thailand) Grand Sport	
2022	(Vietnam) Kamito	
2023	(Vietnam) VNA Sport	
2023–2025	(Spain) Kelme	

== Players ==
=== Former notable players ===
- (Brazil) Claudecir
- (Brazil) Thiago Papel
- (Democratic Republic of the Congo) Patiyo Tambwe
- (Ghana) David Annas
- (Nigeria) Charles Atshimene
- (Nigeria) Suleiman Oladoja Abdullah
- (Nigeria) Samson Olaleye Kayode
- (Nigeria) Dio Preye
- (Uganda) Henry Kisekka
- (Vietnam) Đào Văn Phong
- (Vietnam) Đinh Thanh Trung
- (Vietnam) Hà Minh Tuấn
- (Vietnam) Hồ Văn Thuận
- (Vietnam) Huỳnh Tấn Sinh
- (Vietnam) Lê Phước Tứ
- (Vietnam) Lê Văn Nam
- (Vietnam) Ngân Văn Đại
- (Vietnam) Nguyễn Đình Bắc
- (Vietnam) Nguyễn Huy Hùng
- (Vietnam) Nguyễn Ngọc Nguyên
- (Vietnam) Phạm Văn Cường
- (Vietnam) Phan Thanh Hưng
- (Vietnam) Trần Văn Học

== Head coach ==
=== Managerial history ===
Name	Period	Honours
(Brazil) Luciano de Abreu	2005–2006	
(Vietnam) Nguyễn Thành Kiểm	2007	
(Vietnam) Lê Văn Minh	2008–2009	
(Vietnam) Trần Vũ	2009–2010	
(Portugal) José Luís	2010	
(Vietnam) Nguyễn Mạnh Cường	2010–2011	
(Vietnam) Trần Vũ	2011–2012	
(Vietnam) Nguyễn Văn Thịnh	2012–2013	
(Vietnam) Vũ Quang Bảo	2013–2014	2013 V.League 2
(Vietnam) Hoàng Văn Phúc	2014–2019	2017 V.League 1; 2017 Vietnamese Super Cup
(Vietnam) Vũ Hồng Việt	2019–2020	
(Vietnam) Đào Quang Hùng	2020	
(Vietnam) Nguyễn Thành Công	2020–2021	
(Vietnam) Dương Hồng Sơn	2021–2022	
(Vietnam) Văn Sỹ Sơn	2022–2025	2023 V.League 2

== Season-by-season record ==
Season	Pld	Won	Draw	Lost	GF	GA	GD	PTS	Final position	Notes
2008 Second League									1st	Promoted to 2009 First League
2009 First League	24	4	11	9	23	34	−11	23	12th	
2010 First League	24	11	5	8	28	22	+6	38	5th	
2011 First League	26	7	9	10	30	33	−3	30	9th	
2012 First League	26	7	10	9	27	32	−5	31	10th	
2013 V.League 2	14	7	4	3	26	16	+10	25	1st	Promoted to 2014 V.League 1
2014 V.League 1	22	7	4	11	35	53	−18	25	8th	
2015 V.League 1	26	9	9	8	49	39	+10	36	8th	
2016 V.League 1	26	11	9	6	44	32	+12	42	5th	
2017 V.League 1	26	13	9	4	46	32	+14	48	Champions	
2018 V.League 1	26	7	10	9	37	45	−8	31	11th	
2019 V.League 1	26	8	10	8	43	38	+5	34	9th	
2020 V.League 1	18	5	3	10	28	41	-13	18	14th	Relegation to the 2021 V.League 2
2021 V.League 2	7	1	3	3	7	8	-1	6	9th	Season canceled due to COVID-19 pandemic.
2022 V.League 2	22	12	4	6	30	22	+8	40	9th	
2023 V.League 2	18	11	4	3	40	15	+25	37	1st	Promoted to 2023–24 V.League 1
2023–24 V.League 1	26	8	8	10	34	36	-2	32	10th	
2024–25 V.League 1	26	5	11	10	27	36	−9	26	11th	

== Honours ==
National competitions

League

- V.League 1
  - Winners: 2017
- V.League 2
  - Winners: 2013, 2023
- Second Division
  - Winners: 2003, 2008

Cup

- Vietnamese Super Cup
  - Winners: 2017
- Vietnamese National Football Cup
  - Runners-up: 2019

International competitions

Friendly

- Thiên Long Cup
  - Winners: 2024

== Incident ==
On June 25, the Quang Nam youth football team had an accident when their vehicle overturned at Vi O Lac pass in Ba To district, Quang Ngai province. This incident killed one player and injured five players and one fan, two of whom were seriously injured. Club members confirmed the truth about the team vehicle overturning. The player who died in the accident was Vo Minh Hieu, while the two seriously injured players were L.Q.H and N.P.H.

The accident occurred when the Quang Nam youth team was on their way back from a 5-0 victory over Gama Vinh Phuc in the 2023 National Second Division, which took place at Kon Tum provincial stadium.
