= 2018 V.League 1 =

Nuti Café V.League 1 - 2018
- Season: 2018
- Dates: 10 March – 8 October
- Champions: Hanoi FC; 4th VL1 title 4th Vietnamese title
- Relegated: XSKT Cantho
- AFC Champions League: Hanoi FC
- AFC Cup: Becamex Binh Duong
- Matches: 182
- Goals: 541 (2.97 per match)
- Top goalscorer: Ganiyu Oseni (16 goals)
- Biggest home win: Hanoi FC 5–0 Hoang Anh Gia Lai (5 April); FLC Thanh Hoa 5–0 Quang Nam FC (19 September); Ho Chi Minh City FC 5–0 Saigon FC (19 September)
- Biggest away win: SHB Danang 0–4 Hanoi FC (14 April)
- Highest scoring: 9 goals Hanoi FC 6–3 Ho Chi Minh City FC (8 July)
- Longest winning run: 8 matches Song Lam Nghe An
- Longest unbeaten run: 13 matches Hanoi FC
- Longest winless run: 14 matches Ho Chi Minh City FC; XSKT Cantho
- Longest losing run: 7 matches XSKT Cantho
- Highest attendance: 22,000; Nam Dinh FC 0–0 XSKT Cantho (11 March)
- Lowest attendance: 0 Nam Dinh FC 1–1 Quang Nam FC (21 July)
- Total attendance: 1,139,800
- Average attendance: 6,297
- All statistics correct as of complete.

The 2018 V.League 1 season (for sponsorship reasons also known as Nuti Café V.League 1) was the 35th season of the V.League 1, the highest division of Vietnamese football and the 18th as a professional league. The season started on 10 March 2018 and ran until 8 October 2018. It was expected to be known as the Toyota V.League 1, however, in December 2017 Toyota ended their sponsorship deal with the Vietnam Football Federation one year early.

== Changes from last season ==
=== Team changes ===
The following teams have changed division since the 2017 season.

==== To V.League 1 ====
Promoted from V.League 2

- Nam Dinh FC

==== From V.League 1 ====
Relegated to V.League 2

- Long An FC

=== Rule changes ===
Due to the increased number of teams in 2018 V.League 2 (10), there will be 1.5 relegation places in the 2018 V.League 1 season - the team finishing 14th will be relegated automatically, whilst the team finishing 13th will play a two-legged play-off against the team that finishes second in the 2018 V.League 2.

The league will continue to operate the "2+1" foreigner rule, meaning each squad shall be allowed 2 non-Vietnamese players and 1 naturalised Vietnamese. FLC Thanh Hoa and Song Lam Nghe An shall be allowed 3 non-Vietnamese players, 1 naturalised Vietnamese and 1 player from Asia because they will participate in AFC Cup.

== Teams ==
Locations of the 2018 V.League 1 teams

Team	Location	Stadium	Capacity	Previous season rank
Becamex Binh Duong	Binh Duong	Go Dau	13,035	VL1 (11th)
XSKT Cantho	Cantho	Cantho	60,000	VL1 (13th)
SHB Danang	Danang	Hoa Xuan	20,000	VL1 (9th)
Hoang Anh Gia Lai	Gia Lai	Pleiku	12,000	VL1 (10th)
Haiphong FC	Haiphong	Lach Tray	25,000	VL1 (7th)
Hanoi FC	Hanoi	Hang Day	22,500	VL1 (3rd)
Ho Chi Minh City FC	Ho Chi Minh City	Thong Nhat	16,000	VL1 (12th)
Saigon FC	Ho Chi Minh City	Thong Nhat	16,000	VL1 (5th)
Sanna Khanh Hoa BVN	Khanh Hoa	19 August	25,000	VL1 (6th)
Nam Dinh FC	Nam Dinh	Thien Truong	30,000	VL2 (1st)
Song Lam Nghe An	Nghe An	Vinh	18,000	VL1 (8th)
Quang Nam FC	Quang Nam	Tam Ky	15,000	VL1 (1st)
Than Quang Ninh	Quang Ninh	Cam Pha	20,000	VL1 (4th)
FLC Thanh Hoa	Thanh Hoa	Thanh Hoa	12,000	VL1 (2nd)

=== Personnel and kits ===
Note: Flags indicate national team as has been defined under FIFA eligibility rules. Players may hold more than one non-FIFA nationality.

Team	Head coach	Captain	Kit manufacturer
Becamex Binh Duong	(Vietnam) Trần Minh Chiến	(Vietnam) Nguyễn Anh Đức	(Italy) Kappa
XSKT Cantho	(Vietnam) Vũ Quang Bảo	(Vietnam) Tô Vĩnh Lợi	(Vietnam) KeepDri
SHB Danang	(Vietnam) Nguyễn Minh Phương	(Vietnam) Do Merlo	Made by club
Hoang Anh Gia Lai	(Vietnam) Dương Minh Ninh	(Vietnam) Lương Xuân Trường	(Japan) Mizuno
Haiphong FC	(Vietnam) Trương Việt Hoàng	(Vietnam) Lê Văn Phú	(England) Mitre
Hanoi FC	(Vietnam) Chu Đình Nghiêm	(Vietnam) Nguyễn Văn Quyết	(Italy) Kappa
Ho Chi Minh City FC	(Japan) Toshiya Miura	(Vietnam) Trương Đình Luật	(Japan) Mizuno
Saigon FC	(Vietnam) Nguyễn Thành Công	(Vietnam) Nguyễn Ngọc Duy	(Vietnam) Kami
Sanna Khanh Hoa BVN	(Vietnam) Võ Đình Tân	(France) Chaher Zarour	Made by club
Nam Dinh FC	(Vietnam) Nguyễn Văn Sỹ	(Vietnam) Nguyễn Hữu Định	(Vietnam) VNA Sport
Song Lam Nghe An	(Vietnam) Nguyễn Đức Thắng	(Vietnam) Trần Nguyên Mạnh	(England) Mitre
Quang Nam FC	(Vietnam) Hoàng Văn Phúc	(Vietnam) Đinh Thanh Trung	(Vietnam) Jogarbola
Than Quang Ninh	(Vietnam) Phan Thanh Hùng	(Vietnam) Huỳnh Tuấn Linh	(Spain) Joma
FLC Thanh Hoa	(Vietnam) Nguyễn Đức Thắng	(Senegal) Pape Omar Faye	(England) Mitre

=== Managerial changes ===
Team	Outgoing manager	Manner of departure	Date of vacancy	Position	Incoming manager	Date of appointment
FLC Thanh Hoa	(Serbia) Ljupko Petrović	Resigned	28 November 2017	Pre-season	(Romania) Marian Mihail	15 December 2017
SHB Danang	(Vietnam) Le Huynh Duc	Resigned	25 November 2017	Pre-season	(Vietnam) Nguyen Minh Phuong	28 December 2017
XSKT Cantho	(Vietnam) Vu Quang Bao	Sacked	25 November 2017	Pre-season	(Vietnam) Đinh Hồng Vinh	25 December 2017
Saigon FC	(Vietnam) Nguyen Duc Thang	Out of contract	31 January 2018	Pre-season	(Vietnam) Phan Van Tai Em	3 April 2018
FLC Thanh Hoa	(Romania) Marian Mihail	Mutual consent	7 April 2018	7th	(Vietnam) Hoang Thanh Tung	7 April 2018
FLC Thanh Hoa	(Vietnam) Hoang Thanh Tung	Demote	3 May 2018	7th	(Vietnam) Nguyen Duc Thang	3 May 2018
Saigon FC	(Vietnam) Phan Van Tai Em	Resigned	28 June 2018	16th	(Vietnam) Nguyen Thanh Cong	29 June 2018
XSKT Cantho	(Vietnam) Dinh Hong Vinh	?	26 July 2018	20th	(Vietnam) Vu Quang Bao	31 July 2018

== Foreign players ==
Club	Player 1	Player 2	AFC Player	Naturalised Vietnamese Player	Former Players ^{1}
Becamex Binh Duong	(Nigeria) Chinedu Udoka	(Burkina Faso) Ali Rabo		(Nigeria) → (Vietnam) Eyerakpo Maxwell	(Netherlands) Romario Kortzorg (Greece) Alexandros Tanidis
XSKT Cantho	(Brazil) Wander Luiz	(Democratic Republic of the Congo) Patiyo Tambwe		(Nigeria) → (Vietnam) Dio Preye	(Russia) Rod Dyachenko
SHB Danang	(Ivory Coast) Kouassi Yao Hermann	(Cameroon) Louis Epassi		(Argentina) → (Vietnam) Gastón Merlo	(Brazil) Diogo Pereira
Hoang Anh Gia Lai	(Croatia) Josip Zeba	(Brazil) Osmar			(South Korea) Kim Jin-seo (Jamaica) Rimario Gordon
Haiphong FC	(Jamaica) Diego Fagan	(Jamaica) Errol Stevens		(Ghana) → (Vietnam) Issifu Ansah	
Hanoi FC	(Uganda) Moses Oloya	(Nigeria) Oseni Ganiyu		(Nigeria) → (Vietnam) Samson Kayode	
Ho Chi Minh City FC	(Palestine) Matías Jadue	(Brazil) Marclei		(Brazil) → (Vietnam) Kesley Alves	(Brazil) Gustavo ^{INJ} (Portugal) Paulo Tavares (Argentina) Gonzalo Marronkle
Saigon FC	(Mauritania) Dominique Da Sylva	(Belgium) Marvin Ogunjimi		(Uganda) → (Vietnam) Geoffrey Kizito	(Burundi) Dugary Ndabashinze (Ghana) Lê Văn Tân
Sanna Khanh Hoa BVN	(France) Chaher Zarour	(France) Youssouf Touré			
Nam Dinh FC	(Netherlands) Romario Kortzorg	(Brazil) Diogo Pereira		(Nigeria) → (Vietnam) Theophilus Esele	(Brazil) Alex Rafael (Trinidad and Tobago) Neil Benjamin (Trinidad and Tobago) Henry Shackiel
Song Lam Nghe An	(Nigeria) Michael Olaha	(Jamaica) Jermie Lynch			(Brazil) Osmar
Quang Nam FC	(Brazil) Douglas Tardin	(Brazil) Warley Oliveira		(Brazil) → (Vietnam) Thiago Papel	(Brazil) Wander Luiz (Brazil) Claudecir ^{INJ} (Nigeria) Nguyễn Trung Đại Dương
Than Quang Ninh	(Brazil) Eydison	(Brazil) Joel Vinicius			(Uganda) Geoffrey Kizito
FLC Thanh Hoa	(Senegal) Pape Omar Faye	(Jamaica) Rimario Gordon		(Netherlands) → (Vietnam) Danny van Bakel	(Japan) Ryutaro Karube (Nigeria) Edward Ofere

- ^1 Foreign players who left their clubs after first leg or be replaced because of injuries.
- ^INJ Player withdrew from the squad due to an injury.

== Standings ==
=== League table ===
Pos	Team	Pld	W	D	L	GF	GA	GD	Pts	Qualification or relegation
1	Hanoi FC (C)	26	20	4	2	72	30	+42	64	Qualification for the AFC Champions League Preliminary Round 2 (Note: If Hanoi cannot qualify for the AFC Champions League group stage, they will enter the AFC Cup group stage.)
2	FLC Thanh Hoa	26	13	7	6	43	29	+14	46	
3	Sanna Khanh Hoa BVN (Q)	26	11	10	5	33	27	+6	43	Qualification to Mekong Club Championship
4	Song Lam Nghe An	26	12	6	8	38	32	+6	42	
5	Than Quang Ninh	26	9	8	9	40	39	+1	35	
6	Haiphong FC	26	9	7	10	26	26	0	34	
7	Becamex Binh Duong (Note: Becamex Binh Duong qualified to 2019 AFC Cup by winning 2018 Vietnamese Cup) (Q)	26	7	12	7	39	36	+3	33	Qualification to AFC Cup Group Stage
8	Saigon FC	26	9	4	13	36	40	−4	31	
9	SHB Danang	26	8	7	11	38	49	−11	31	
10	Hoang Anh Gia Lai	26	8	7	11	41	53	−12	31	
11	Quang Nam FC	26	7	10	9	37	45	−8	31	
12	Ho Chi Minh City FC	26	7	6	13	36	44	−8	27	
13	Nam Dinh FC (O)	26	5	9	12	33	45	−12	24	Qualification to Relegation Play-off
14	XSKT Cantho (R)	26	4	9	13	26	43	−17	21	Relegation to V.League 2

Source: vnleague.com
Rules for classification: 1) Points; 2) Head-to-head points; 3) Head-to-head goal difference; 4) Head-to-head goals scored; 5) Head-to-head away goals scored; 6) Goal difference; 7) Goals scored; 8) Away goals scored; 9) Play-off (Only to decide champions, runners-up, third placed and relegation spots); 10) Drawing of lots (Criteria 2 to 5 only applies after the conclusion of round 13)
(C) Champions; (O) Play-off winners; (Q) Qualified for the phase indicated; (R) Relegated

=== Positions by round ===
This table lists the positions of teams after each week of matches. In order to preserve the chronological evolution, any postponed matches are not included to the round at which they were originally scheduled, but added to the full round they were played immediately afterwards. For example, if a match is scheduled for matchday 13, but then postponed and played between days 16 and 17, it will be added to the standings for day 16.

Team ╲ Round	1	2	3	4	5	6	7	8	9	10	11	12	13	14	15	16	17	18	19	20	21	22	23	24	25	26
Becamex Binh Duong	6	3	4	8	9	9	4	3	3	3	3	4	4	6	8	9	9	10	8	7	8	8	6	6	9	7
FLC Thanh Hoa	9	5	9	7	6	6	7	5	8	9	9	10	8	8	5	2	3	3	3	4	3	4	3	3	2	2
Hanoi FC	2	1	2	1	1	1	1	1	1	1	1	1	1	1	1	1	1	1	1	1	1	1	1	1	1	1
Haiphong FC	13	11	6	11	13	10	6	7	5	6	6	3	5	3	4	5	7	7	7	8	9	7	8	7	8	6
Hoang Anh Gia Lai	5	7	11	9	11	8	9	9	7	4	4	6	7	9	7	6	5	6	6	6	7	9	10	9	7	10
Ho Chi Minh City FC	12	13	10	6	4	4	8	11	11	11	11	11	11	13	14	13	14	14	11	11	12	11	9	11	12	12
Nam Dinh FC	7	10	14	14	14	14	14	14	14	14	14	14	14	14	13	12	13	13	12	13	13	13	13	13	13	13
Quang Nam FC	4	8	5	12	7	7	10	10	9	7	5	7	6	5	6	7	8	8	9	9	6	6	7	8	6	11
Saigon FC	3	9	13	13	12	13	12	12	12	13	13	12	13	12	12	14	12	12	14	12	11	12	12	12	10	8
Sanna Khanh Hoa BVN	10	4	3	3	3	3	3	4	6	6	8	5	3	4	3	3	2	2	2	2	2	2	2	2	3	3
Song Lam Nghe An	11	14	12	10	10	12	13	13	13	12	12	13	12	11	10	8	6	5	5	3	4	3	4	4	4	4
SHB Danang	14	6	7	4	8	11	11	8	10	10	10	8	9	7	9	10	10	9	10	10	10	10	11	10	11	9
Than Quang Ninh	1	2	1	2	2	2	2	2	2	2	2	2	2	2	2	4	4	4	4	5	5	5	5	5	5	5
XSKT Cantho	8	12	8	5	5	5	5	6	4	5	7	8	10	10	11	11	11	11	13	14	14	14	14	14	14	14

Winner; Champions League
Relegation play-off
Relegate to V.League 2

Source: Table by round (in Vietnamese)

== Results ==
Home \ Away	BBD	FTH	HAN	HPG	HGL	HCM	NDI	QNM	SGN	SKH	SNA	SDN	TQN	XCT
Becamex Binh Duong		3–3	1–1	2–1	4–1	1–1	2–1	3–1	5–1	0–3	1–2	4–1	1–1	1–0
FLC Thanh Hoa	3–1		2–3	2–0	0–1	1–0	2–2	5–0	1–1	1–0	1–0	1–0	1–1	1–1
Hanoi FC	2–0	4–3		1–0	5–0	6–3	3–3	2–1	1–1	4–0	2–0	5–2	4–1	3–0
Haiphong FC	1–1	2–0	1–0		1–1	2–0	1–1	0–2	1–0	3–0	2–3	3–2	0–1	0–1
Hoang Anh Gia Lai	0–0	0–3	3–5	0–0		2–2	3–2	2–3	3–2	2–4	1–0	2–0	4–0	3–1
Ho Chi Minh City FC	1–1	1–2	1–4	0–1	5–3		1–2	0–0	5–0	1–0	0–2	4–2	2–1	3–3
Nam Dinh FC	2–1	1–1	0–2	0–1	0–2	1–3		1–1	1–0	1–2	2–3	4–2	1–1	0–0
Quang Nam FC	4–4	1–0	0–1	1–1	2–2	2–1	5–2		1–1	0–0	1–1	2–2	2–3	1–0
Saigon FC	2–0	0–1	5–2	0–1	3–1	1–2	1–0	4–1		1–1	2–1	1–0	1–2	1–2
Sanna Khanh Hoa BVN	1–1	3–1	1–1	0–0	1–1	2–0	2–2	2–2	2–1		1–2	0–0	1–0	2–1
Song Lam Nghe An	0–0	0–1	1–2	1–0	3–1	1–0	0–1	2–1	3–2	0–1		3–1	2–2	1–0
SHB Danang	0–0	3–3	0–4	2–1	2–1	3–0	4–2	2–1	3–2	0–0	2–2		3–2	2–1
Than Quang Ninh	1–1	1–3	1–2	3–3	3–0	1–0	1–0	3–0	1–2	1–2	2–2	1–0		5–1
XSKT Cantho	2–1	0–1	0–3	2–0	2–2	1–1	1–1	1–2	1–3	1–2	3–3	0–0	1–1	

Legend: Blue = home team win; Yellow = draw; Red = away team win.

=== Play-off match ===
The team finishing 13th faced the runner-up of 2018 V.League 2.

Nam Dinh FC won the match and would remain in the 2019 V.League 1.

13 October 2018
16:30

Nam Dinh FC	0–0	Hanoi II
	VPF
Penalties
Nguyen Ha Long (penalty scored); Nguyen Huu Dinh (penalty scored); Vu The Vuong (penalty scored); Nguyen Dinh Manh (penalty scored); Dinh Viet Tu (penalty scored)	5-3	(penalty scored) Pham Tuan Hai; (penalty scored) Le Van Xuan; (penalty missed) Le Xuan Tu; (penalty scored) Ly Cong Hoang Anh

Vinh Stadium, Nghe An
Attendance: 9,000
Referee: Ngo Duy Lan

== Attendances ==
As of 8 October 2018

=== By club ===
Pos	Team	Total	High	Low	Average	Change
1	Nam Dinh FC	166,000	22,000	0	13,833	+93.0%^{†}
2	Hanoi FC	119,500	20,000	2,000	9,192	+48.4%
3	Hoang Anh Gia Lai	104,500	12,000	4,000	8,038	−4.1%
4	FLC Thanh Hoa	96,000	13,000	1,000	7,385	−20.0%
5	Haiphong FC	82,000	21,000	2,000	6,308	−14.6%
6	Sanna Khanh Hoa BVN	81,000	15,000	2,000	6,231	+26.6%
7	SHB Danang	79,000	13,000	3,000	6,077	−24.8%
8	Quang Nam FC	67,000	12,000	1,000	5,154	−19.8%
9	Song Lam Nghe An	66,500	10,000	1,500	5,115	+19.8%
10	Than Quang Ninh	64,000	8,000	2,000	4,923	−28.1%
11	XSKT Cantho	63,800	12,000	1,500	4,908	+140.8%
12	Becamex Binh Duong	58,000	18,000	1,500	4,462	+28.9%
13	Ho Chi Minh City FC	55,000	12,000	2,000	4,231	−15.4%
14	Saigon FC	44,500	12,000	1,000	3,423	+1.1%
	League total	1,139,800	22,000	1,000	6,263	+12.0%

Updated to games played on complete
Source: Vietnam Professional Football
Notes:
^{†} Teams played previous season in V.League 2

=== By round ===
2018 V.League 1 Attendance
Round	Total	Games	Avg. Per Game
Round 1	78,000	7	11,143
Round 2	71,000	7	10,143
Round 3	74,000	7	10,571
Round 4	58,000	7	8,286
Round 5	72,000	7	10,286
Round 6	51,500	7	7,357
Round 7	42,000	7	6,000
Round 8	50,000	7	7,143
Round 9	46,000	7	6,571
Round 10	42,500	7	6,071
Round 11	42,000	7	6,000
Round 12	38,200	7	5,457
Round 13	54,000	7	7,714
Round 14	33,000	7	4,714
Round 15	28,000	7	4,000
Round 16	38,000	7	5,429
Round 17	29,100	7	4,157
Round 18	34,500	7	4,929
Round 19	27,000	7	3,857
Round 20	24,000	7	3,429
Round 21	49,500	7	7,071
Round 22	34,500	7	4,929
Round 23	24,000	7	3,429
Round 24	31,000	7	4,429
Round 25	32,500	7	4,643
Round 26	35,500	7	5,071
Total	1,139,800	182	6,263

=== Highest attendances ===
Rank	Home team	Score	Away team	Attendance	Date	Stadium
1	Nam Dinh FC	0–0	XSKT Cantho	22,000	11 March 2018	Thien Truong Stadium
2	Haiphong FC	1–1	Hoang Anh Gia Lai	21,000	17 March 2018	Lach Tray Stadium
3	Hanoi FC	5–0	Hoang Anh Gia Lai	20,000	5 April 2018	Hang Day Stadium
4	Becamex Binh Duong	3–3	FLC Thanh Hoa	18,000	15 April 2018	Go Dau Stadium
5	Nam Dinh FC	0–1	Haiphong FC	17,000	22 March 2018	Thien Truong Stadium
5	Nam Dinh FC	0–2	Hoang Anh Gia Lai	17,000	28 September 2018	Thien Truong Stadium

== Season statistics ==
=== Top scorers ===
As of 20 September 2018

Rank	Player	Club	Goals
1	(Nigeria) Oseni Ganiyu	Hanoi FC	16
2	(Vietnam) Hoang Vu Samson	Hanoi FC	13
2	(Brazil) Eydison	Than Quang Ninh	13
4	(Vietnam) Nguyen Tien Linh	Becamex Binh Duong	12
4	(Brazil) Wander Luiz	XSKT Cantho	12
4	(France) Youssouf Touré	Sanna Khanh Hoa BVN	12
7	(Vietnam) Nguyen Cong Phuong	Hoang Anh Gia Lai	11
8	(Mauritania) Dominique Da Sylva	Saigon FC	10
8	(Senegal) Pape Omar Faye	FLC Thanh Hoa	10
10	(Vietnam) Nguyen Quang Hai	Hanoi FC	9
10	(Vietnam) Phan Van Duc	Song Lam Nghe An	9
10	(Vietnam) Ha Duc Chinh	SHB Danang	9
10	(Palestine) Matías Jadue	Ho Chi Minh City FC	9

=== Top assists ===
As of 20 September 2018

Rank	Player	Club	Assists
1	(Vietnam) Nghiem Xuan Tu	Than Quang Ninh	15
2	(Vietnam) Nguyen Van Quyet	Hanoi FC	9
3	(Vietnam) Do Hung Dung	Hanoi FC	8
3	(Vietnam) Tran Phi Son	Ho Chi Minh City FC	8
5	(Vietnam) Ho Khac Ngoc	Song Lam Nghe An	7
5	(Vietnam) To Van Vu	Becamex Binh Duong	7
5	(Vietnam) Le Tan Tai	Becamex Binh Duong	7
5	(Vietnam) Tran Van Kien	Hanoi FC	7
9	(Vietnam) Nguyen Quang Hai	Hanoi FC	6
9	(Vietnam) Luong Xuan Truong	Hoang Anh Gia Lai	6

=== Own goals ===
Player	Club	Against	Round
(Vietnam) Pham Van Thuan	Nam Dinh FC	Ho Chi Minh City FC	5
(Vietnam) Ho Tan Tai	Becamex Binh Duong	FLC Thanh Hoa	5
(Brazil) Thiago Papel	Quang Nam FC	Becamex Binh Duong	7
(Vietnam) Trinh Van Loi	Haiphong FC	Than Quang Ninh	10
(Nigeria) Michael Olaha	Song Lam Nghe An	SHB Danang	11
(Vietnam) Nguyen Thanh Binh	SHB Danang	Song Lam Nghe An	22

=== Hat-tricks ===
Player	For	Against	Result	Date	Round
(Nigeria) Oseni Ganiyu	Hanoi FC	SHB Danang	4–0(A)	14 April 2018	5
(Vietnam) Ha Minh Tuan	Quang Nam FC	Nam Dinh FC	5–2(H)	26 May 2018	9
(Vietnam) Nguyen Tien Linh ^{4}	Becamex Binh Duong	Saigon FC	5–1(H)	29 May 2018	10
(Brazil) Eydison	Than Quang Ninh	Hoang Anh Gia Lai	3–0(H)	9 June 2018	12
(Mauritania) Dominique Da Sylva ^{4}	Saigon FC	Hanoi FC	5–2(H)	17 June 2018	14
(Vietnam) Hoang Vu Samson ^{4}	Hanoi FC	Ho Chi Minh City FC	6–3(H)	8 July 2018	18
(Vietnam) Dinh Thanh Trung	Quang Nam FC	Becamex Binh Duong	4–4(H)	8 July 2018	18
(Vietnam) Nguyen Tien Linh	Becamex Binh Duong	Quang Nam FC	4–4(A)	8 July 2018	18
(Palestine) Matías Jadue	Ho Chi Minh City FC	SHB Danang	4–2(H)	14 July 2018	19
(Jamaica) Rimario Gordon	FLC Thanh Hoa	Hoang Anh Gia Lai	3–0(A)	9 September 2018	21
(Vietnam) Nguyen Hai Anh	Ho Chi Minh City FC	Saigon FC	5–0(H)	19 September 2018	23

- Note:

^{4}: scored 4 goals; (H) – Home; (A) – Away

=== Clean sheets ===
Rank	Player	Club	Clean sheets
1	(Vietnam) Nguyen Van Cong	Hanoi FC	8
2	(Vietnam) Dang Van Lam	Haiphong FC	7
3	(Vietnam) Nguyen Tuan Manh	Sanna Khanh Hoa BVN	6
3	(Vietnam) Huynh Tuan Linh	Than Quang Ninh	6
5	(Vietnam) Pham Van Cuong	Quang Nam FC	5

== Awards ==
=== Monthly awards ===
Month	Club of the Month	Manager of the Month		Player of the Month		Goal of the Month		References
Month	Club	Manager	Club	Player	Club	Player	Club	References
March	Than Quang Ninh	(Vietnam) Phan Thanh Hung	Than Quang Ninh	(Brazil) Eydison	Than Quang Ninh	(Vietnam) Luong Xuan Truong	Hoang Anh Gia Lai	
April	Hanoi FC	(Vietnam) Chu Dinh Nghiem	Hanoi FC	(Nigeria) Oseni Ganiyu	Hanoi FC	(Vietnam) Ha Duc Chinh	SHB Danang	
May	Hanoi	(Vietnam) Tran Minh Chien	Becamex Binh Duong	(Vietnam) Nguyen Tien Linh	Becamex Binh Duong	(Vietnam) Nguyen Cong Phuong	Hoang Anh Gia Lai	
June	Hanoi	(Vietnam) Nguyen Duc Thang	FLC Thanh Hoa	(Vietnam) Nguyen Quang Hai	Hanoi FC	(Vietnam) Tran Minh Phuong	Hoang Anh Gia Lai	

=== Annual awards ===
Award	Winner	Club
V.League 1 Manager of the Season	(Vietnam) Chu Dinh Nghiem	Hanoi FC
V.League 1 Player of the Season	(Vietnam) Nguyen Van Quyet	Hanoi FC
V.League 1 Top Goalscorer	(Nigeria) Ganiyu Oseni	Hanoi FC
V.League 1 Young Player of the Year	(Vietnam) Nguyen Quang Hai	Hanoi FC
V.League 1 Referee of the Year	(Vietnam) Ngo Duy Lan	
V.League 1 Assistant Referee of the Year	(Vietnam) Phạm Manh Long	

=== Team of the Year ===
VPF Team of the Year
Goalkeeper	(Vietnam) Dang Van Lam (Haiphong FC)			
Defence	(Vietnam) Vu Van Thanh (Hoang Anh Gia Lai)	(Vietnam) Do Duy Manh (Hanoi FC)	(France) Chaher Zarour (Sanna Khanh Hoa BVN)	(Vietnam) Doan Van Hau (Hanoi FC)
Midfield	(Vietnam) Nguyen Quang Hai (Hanoi FC)	(Vietnam) Ngo Hoang Thinh (FLC Thanh Hoa)	(Uganda) Moses Oloya (Hanoi FC)	(Vietnam) Nghiem Xuan Tu (Than Quang Ninh)
Attack	(Vietnam) Nguyen Cong Phuong (Hoang Anh Gia Lai)		(Vietnam) Nguyen Van Quyet (Hanoi FC)	
