= 2019 V.League 1 =

63rd season of the highest division of association football in Vietnam

Wake Up 247 V.League 1 – 2019
- Season: 2019
- Dates: 21 February – 23 October
- Champions: Hanoi FC; 5th VL1 title 5th Vietnamese title
- Relegated: Sanna Khanh Hoa BVN
- AFC Cup: Ho Chi Minh City FC; Than Quang Ninh
- Matches: 182
- Goals: 534 (2.93 per match)
- Top goalscorer: Bruno Cantanhede; Pape Omar Faye (15 goals)
- Biggest home win: Hanoi FC 5–0 Than Quang Ninh (23 February); Hanoi FC 5–0 Thanh Hoa FC (11 August); Hanoi FC 6–1 Duoc Nam Ha Nam Dinh (11 September)
- Biggest away win: Becamex Binh Duong 1–5 Song Lam Nghe An (15 September)
- Highest scoring: Viettel 5–3 SHB Danang (23 October)
- Longest winning run: 6 matches Hanoi FC
- Longest unbeaten run: 14 matches Hanoi FC
- Longest winless run: 11 matches Thanh Hoa FC
- Longest losing run: 8 matches Thanh Hoa FC
- Highest attendance: 25,000; Duoc Nam Ha Nam Dinh 2–2 Hoang Anh Gia Lai (4 August)
- Lowest attendance: 0 Hanoi FC 5–2 Viettel (15 September); Hanoi FC 2–2 Quang Nam FC (19 October)
- Total attendance: 1,306,700
- Average attendance: 7,180
- All statistics correct as of complete.

The 2019 V.League 1 (known as the Wake Up 247 V.League 1 for sponsorship reasons) season was the 36th season of the V.League 1, the highest division of Vietnamese football and the 19th as a professional league.

== Changes from last season ==
=== Team changes ===
The following teams have changed division since the 2018 season.

==== To V.League 1 ====
Promoted from V.League 2

- Viettel

==== From V.League 1 ====
Relegated to V.League 2

- XSKT Cantho

=== Rule changes ===
There will be 1.5 relegation places in the 2019 V.League 1 season - the team finishing 14th will be relegated automatically, while the team finishing 13th will play against the team that finishes second in the 2019 V.League 2.

The league will operate the "3+1" foreigner rule, where each team is allowed 3 non-Vietnamese players and 1 naturalized Vietnamese.

== Teams ==
Locations of the 2019 V.League 1 teams

Team	Location	Stadium	Capacity	Previous season rank
Becamex Binh Duong	Binh Duong	Go Dau	13,035	VL1 (7th)
SHB Danang	Danang	Hoa Xuan	20,000	VL1 (9th)
Hoang Anh Gia Lai	Gia Lai	Pleiku	12,000	VL1 (10th)
Haiphong FC	Haiphong	Lach Tray	25,000	VL1 (6th)
Hanoi FC	Hanoi	Hang Day	22,500	VL1 (1st)
Viettel	Hanoi	Hang Day	22,500	VL2 (1st)
Ho Chi Minh City FC	Ho Chi Minh City	Thong Nhat	16,000	VL1 (12th)
Saigon FC	Ho Chi Minh City	Thong Nhat	16,000	VL1 (8th)
Sanna Khanh Hoa BVN	Khanh Hoa	19 August	25,000	VL1 (3rd)
Duoc Nam Ha Nam Dinh	Nam Dinh	Thien Truong	30,000	VL1 (13th)
Song Lam Nghe An	Nghe An	Vinh	18,000	VL1 (4th)
Quang Nam	Quang Nam	Tam Ky	15,000	VL1 (11th)
Than Quang Ninh	Quang Ninh	Cam Pha	20,000	VL1 (5th)
Thanh Hoa FC	Thanh Hoa	Thanh Hoa	12,000	VL1 (2nd)

=== Personnel and kits ===
Note: Flags indicate national team as has been defined under FIFA eligibility rules. Players may hold more than one non-FIFA nationality.

Team	Manager	Captain	Kit manufacturer
Becamex Binh Duong	(Vietnam) Nguyễn Thanh Sơn	(Vietnam) Nguyễn Anh Đức	(Vietnam) Kamito
SHB Da Nang	(Vietnam) Lê Huỳnh Đức	(Vietnam) Hoàng Minh Tâm	(Vietnam) Kamito
Hoang Anh Gia Lai	(South Korea) Lee Tae-hoon	(Vietnam) Nguyễn Tuấn Anh	(Japan) Mizuno
Haiphong FC	(Vietnam) Trương Việt Hoàng	(Jamaica) Andre Fagan	(Japan) Jogarbola
Hanoi FC	(Vietnam) Chu Đình Nghiêm	(Vietnam) Nguyễn Văn Quyết	(Italy) Kappa
Viettel	(Vietnam) Nguyễn Hải Biên	(Vietnam) Bùi Tiển Dũng	(Vietnam) VNA Sports
Ho Chi Minh City FC	(South Korea) Jung Hae-seong	(Vietnam) Huỳnh Kesley Alves	(South Korea) Zaicro
Saigon FC	(Vietnam) Nguyễn Thành Công	(Vietnam) Nguyễn Ngọc Duy	(Vietnam) Fraser Sport
Sanna Khanh Hoa BVN	(Vietnam) Võ Đình Tân	(France) Chaher Zarour	Made by club
Duoc Nam Ha Nam Dinh	(Vietnam) Nguyễn Văn Dũng	(Vietnam) Nguyễn Hữu Đỉnh	(Vietnam) VNA Sport
Song Lam Nghe An	(Vietnam) Nguyễn Đức Thắng	(Vietnam) Trần Nguyên Mạnh	(England) Mitre
Quang Nam FC	(Vietnam) Vũ Hồng Việt	(Vietnam) Đinh Thanh Trung	(Japan) Jogarbola
Than Quang Ninh	(Vietnam) Phan Thanh Hùng	(Vietnam) Huỳnh Tuấn Linh	(Spain) Joma
Thanh Hoa FC	(Vietnam) Mai Xuân Hợp	(Vietnam) Hoàng Đình Tùng	(Japan) Jogarbola

=== Managerial changes ===
Team	Outgoing manager	Manner of departure	Date of vacancy	Position in table	Incoming manager	Date of appointment
Ho Chi Minh City FC	(Japan) Toshiya Miura	Sacked	10 October 2018	Pre-season	(South Korea) Jung Hae-seong	18 December 2018
SHB Danang	(Vietnam) Nguyen Minh Phuog	Sacked	31 October 2018	Pre-season	(Vietnam) Le Huynh Duc	13 November 2018
Viettel	(Vietnam) Nguyen Hai Bien	Mutual consent	30 January 2019	Pre-season	(South Korea) Lee Heung-sil	30 January 2019
Becamex Binh Duong	(Vietnam) Tran Minh Chien	Resigned	29 March 2019	6th	(Vietnam) Nguyen Thanh Son	30 March 2019
Hoang Anh Gia Lai	(Vietnam) Duong Minh Ninh	Sacked	21 April 2019	11th	(South Korea) Lee Tae-hoon	21 April 2019
Quang Nam FC	(Vietnam) Hoang Van Phuc	Resigned	22 May 2019	13th	(Vietnam) Vu Hong Viet	23 May 2019
Duoc Nam Ha Nam Dinh	(Vietnam) Nguyen Van Sy	Mutual consent	23 May 2019	12th	(Vietnam) Nguyen Van Dung	24 May 2019
Viettel	(South Korea) Lee Heung-sil	Mutual consent	12 June 2019	11th	(Vietnam) Nguyen Hai Bien	12 June 2019
Thanh Hoa	(Vietnam) Nguyen Duc Thang	Mutual consent	2 July 2019	5th	(Vietnam) Vu Quang Bao	2 July 2019
Thanh Hoa	(Vietnam) Vu Quang Bao	Resigned	13 August 2019	10th	(Vietnam) Mai Xuan Hop (assistant)	13 August 2019

== Foreign players ==
Players name in bold indicates the player is registered during the mid-season transfer window.

Club	Player 1	Player 2	Player 3	Player 4 (AFC Player)	Player 5 (Naturalized Vietnamese player)	Former player
Becamex Bình Dương	(Brazil) **Pedro Augusto**	(Brazil) Wander Luiz	(Burkina Faso) Ali Rabo	(Kyrgyzstan) Veniamin Shumeyko	(Nigeria) → (Vietnam) Eyerakpo Maxwell	(United States) Victor Mansaray
SHB Danang	(France) Victor Nirennold	(Brazil) **Bernardo Frizoni**	(Cameroon) **Aimé Djicka Gassissou**		(Argentina) → (Vietnam) Gastón Merlo	(Brazil) Patrick Boni (Germany) Dominik Schmitt
Hoang Anh Gia Lai	(Brazil) **Felipe Martins**	(Netherlands) Wieger Sietsma	(South Korea) Kim Bong-jin			(Jamaica) Chevaughn Walsh^{INJ}
Haiphong FC	(Jamaica) Andre Fagan	(Jamaica) Jermie Lynch	(Uganda) Joseph Mpande		(Nigeria) → (Vietnam) **Dio Preye**	
Hanoi FC	(Senegal) Pape Omar Faye	(Uganda) Moses Oloya	(France) **Papa Ibou Kébé**	(Iran) **Sajjad Moshkelpour**		(Nigeria) Ganiyu Oseni^{INJ} (Guam) Brandon McDonald
Viettel	(Brazil) **Bruno Cantanhede**	(Brazil) **Janclesio**	(Brazil) **Jean Carlos**			(Brazil) João Paulo (Brazil) Gustavo (Brazil) Kayo Dias
Ho Chi Minh City FC	(Cameroon) Louis Ewonde	(Nigeria) **Ismahil Akinade**	(United States) **Victor Mansaray**		(Brazil) → (Vietnam) Kesley Alves	(Brazil) Joel Vinicius (Palestine) Matias Jadue^{INJ}
Saigon FC	(Brazil) **Geovane**	(Brazil) **Gustavo**	(Brazil) Pedro Paulo		(Uganda) → (Vietnam) Geoffrey Kizito	(Mauritania) Dominique Da Sylva (Brazil) Thiago Moura
Sanna Khanh Hoa BVN	(Democratic Republic of the Congo) **Patiyo Tambwe**	(France) Youssouf Touré	(France) Chaher Zarour		(Nigeria) → (Vietnam) **Suleiman Oladoja Abdullahi**	(Brazil) Warley Oliveira
Duoc Nam Ha Nam Dinh	(Brazil) Diogo Pereira	(Brazil) **Gustavo**	(Nigeria) **Emmanuel Tony Agbaji**		(Ghana) → (Vietnam) Issifu Ansah	(Democratic Republic of the Congo) Patiyo Tambwe (Nigeria) Sunday Emmanuel
Song Lam Nghe An	(Nigeria) Michael Olaha	(Serbia) Damir Memović	(Brazil) **Joel Vinicius**			(Brazil) Marcio
Quang Nam FC	(Brazil) **Rodrigo da Silva Dias**	(Brazil) Gabriel Davis	(Brazil) **Lucas Rocha**		(Nigeria) → (Vietnam) **Samson Kayode**	(Brazil) Thiago Papel (Brazil) Claudecir
Than Quang Ninh	(Bosnia and Herzegovina) Neven Laštro	(Ivory Coast) Kouassi Yao Hermann	(Russia) Rod Dyachenko			
Thanh Hoa FC	(Kosovo) Gramoz Kurtaj	(Jamaica) Rimario Gordon	(Jamaica) **Errol Stevens**			(Nigeria) Monday Samuel

- **^1** Foreign players who left their clubs after first leg or be replaced because of injuries.
- **^INJ** Player withdrew from the squad due to an injury.

== Standings ==
=== League table ===
Pos	Team	Pld	W	D	L	GF	GA	GD	Pts	Qualification or relegation
1	Hanoi FC (C)	26	15	8	3	60	30	+30	53	~~Qualification for ASEAN Club Championship group stage~~ (Note: 2020 ASEAN Club Championship was cancelled due to the pandemic is ongoing and unable to compete in the annual schedule.) (Note: Ha Noi, the league champions and Vietnamese Cup winners, failed to obtain an AFC license (due to their U15 team did not participates in Vietnam National U15 Youth League), and therefore are not eligible for continental qualification. As a result, all AFC Champions League and AFC Cup berths are distributed to the remaining teams by league position.)
2	Ho Chi Minh City FC (Q)	26	14	6	6	41	29	+12	48	Qualification for AFC Champions League preliminary round 2 and ~~qualification for ASEAN Club Championship group stage~~ (Note: If TP Ho Chi Minh cannot qualify for the AFC Champions League group stage, they will enter the AFC Cup group stage.)
3	Than Quang Ninh (Q)	26	10	9	7	41	33	+8	39	Qualification for AFC Cup group stage
4	Becamex Binh Duong	26	10	6	10	32	32	0	36	
5	Saigon FC	26	10	6	10	37	40	−3	36	
6	Viettel	26	11	3	12	33	40	−7	36	
7	Song Lam Nghe An	26	8	11	7	32	26	+6	35	
8	Hoang Anh Gia Lai	26	10	5	11	45	46	−1	35	
9	Quang Nam FC	26	8	10	8	43	38	+5	34	
10	SHB Danang	26	9	6	11	38	38	0	33	
11	Duoc Nam Ha Nam Dinh	26	8	7	11	32	41	−9	31	
12	Haiphong FC	26	8	6	12	33	44	−11	30	
13	Thanh Hoa FC (O)	26	6	8	12	36	52	−16	26	Qualification for Relegation play-off
14	Sanna Khanh Hoa BVN (R)	26	6	7	13	31	45	−14	25	Relegation to V.League 2

Source: VPF
Rules for classification: 1) Points; 2) Head-to-head points; 3) Head-to-head goal difference; 4) Head-to-head goals scored; 5) Head-to-head away goals scored; 6) Goal difference; 7) Goals scored; 8) Away goals scored; 9) Play-off (Only to decide champions, runners-up, third placed and relegation spots); 10) Drawing of lots (Criteria 2 to 5 only applies after the conclusion of round 13)
(C) Champions; (O) Play-off winners; (Q) Qualified for the phase indicated; (R) Relegated

=== Positions by round ===
This table lists the positions of teams after each week of matches. In order to preserve the chronological evolution, any postponed matches are not included to the round at which they were originally scheduled, but added to the full round they were played immediately afterwards. For example, if a match is scheduled for matchday 13, but then postponed and played between days 16 and 17, it will be added to the standings for day 16.

Team ╲ Round	1	2	3	4	5	6	7	8	9	10	11	12	13	14	15	16	17	18	19	20	21	22	23	24	25	26
Becamex Binh Duong	7	3	6	4	6	7	8	10	9	8	11	9	6	8	10	10	10	8	9	8	5	3	5	6	4	4
Duoc Nam Ha Nam Dinh	4	6	10	12	12	9	10	12	12	12	12	12	11	10	8	6	8	5	5	5	8	10	10	12	11	11
Hanoi FC	1	2	2	1	2	2	1	2	2	2	2	2	2	1	2	2	2	2	1	1	1	1	1	1	1	1
Haiphong FC	9	8	4	3	3	5	5	6	5	5	7	10	12	12	12	11	9	11	13	13	11	7	9	10	12	12
Hoang Anh Gia Lai	2	5	9	9	8	12	9	7	7	6	8	8	10	12	13	13	12	10	10	11	13	12	12	11	10	8
Ho Chi Minh City FC	6	1	1	2	1	1	2	1	1	1	1	1	1	2	1	1	1	1	2	2	2	2	2	2	2	2
Quang Nam FC	12	12	12	13	13	11	12	13	13	13	14	13	13	13	11	12	13	13	12	9	6	4	7	7	6	9
Saigon FC	10	9	5	5	5	6	6	4	6	3	4	4	7	7	9	7	11	12	11	12	10	8	6	8	8	5
Sanna Khanh Hoa BVN	13	14	14	12	12	13	13	14	14	14	13	14	14	14	14	14	14	14	14	14	14	14	14	14	14	14
SHB Danang	3	7	7	8	9	10	11	9	8	9	6	6	8	9	6	8	6	4	4	4	7	9	8	5	7	10
Song Lam Nghe An	5	4	3	6	4	3	3	3	3	4	5	5	4	4	5	5	5	9	6	6	4	6	4	4	5	7
Than Quang Ninh	14	13	8	6	7	4	4	5	4	6	3	3	3	3	3	3	3	3	3	3	3	5	3	3	3	3
Thanh Hoa FC	8	11	13	14	14	14	14	11	10	10	9	7	5	5	4	4	4	6	7	10	12	13	13	13	13	13
Viettel	11	10	11	12	10	8	7	8	11	11	10	11	9	6	7	9	7	7	8	7	9	11	11	9	9	6

Champions and qualification to the AFC Champions League preliminary round
Qualification to the AFC Cup group stage
Relegation play-off
Relegation to V.League 2

Source: Table by round (in Vietnamese)

== Results ==
Home \ Away	BBD	HAN	HPG	HAG	HCM	NDI	QNA	SGN	SKH	SLN	DNG	TQN	THH	VTL
Becamex Binh Duong		2–2	2–0	3–0	2–3	1–1	1–1	1–0	1–0	1–5	3–1	0–2	1–1	1–0
Hanoi FC	2–1		3–1	1–1	1–0	6–1	2–2	2–0	2–2	4–0	3–2	5–0	5–0	5–2
Haiphong FC	3–2	1–2		1–0	1–2	2–1	0–3	1–2	1–1	0–0	1–1	3–2	2–2	2–1
Hoang Anh Gia Lai	1–1	0–0	5–1		1–2	2–0	1–2	1–3	4–1	3–2	2–1	3–2	3–3	2–3
Ho Chi Minh City FC	2–0	2–2	1–0	1–2		2–0	1–1	4–1	1–2	2–1	3–2	3–1	0–0	2–0
Duoc Nam Ha Nam Dinh	1–0	2–0	2–1	2–2	1–1		2–3	3–1	1–2	2–0	2–1	1–1	4–2	2–0
Quang Nam FC	1–2	1–1	1–2	3–0	2–0	1–1		3–1	4–2	2–2	1–4	0–1	3–0	0–2
Saigon FC	0–1	1–4	1–0	3–1	0–0	4–1	1–1		2–1	2–2	3–1	2–2	2–0	3–0
Sanna Khanh Hoa BVN	1–0	0–0	3–4	1–4	1–2	3–0	3–2	0–0		1–4	1–0	1–1	1–3	0–1
Song Lam Nghe An	2–1	0–1	0–0	3–0	1–2	0–0	2–0	2–2	0–0		0–0	0–0	1–0	3–1
SHB Danang	0–2	1–2	1–1	2–1	2–0	2–0	2–2	4–1	2–1	0–2		1–0	1–0	3–1
Than Quang Ninh	0–1	4–2	4–2	3–0	1–2	0–0	1–1	3–0	2–1	0–0	1–1		3–0	1–0
Thanh Hoa FC	1–1	4–1	0–3	2–3	3–3	3–2	3–2	2–1	2–2	2–0	0–0	1–3		1–3
Viettel	2–1	0–2	2–0	0–3	1–0	1–0	1–1	0–1	2–0	0–0	5–3	3–3	2–1	

Legend: Blue = home team win; Yellow = draw; Red = away team win.

== Play-off match ==
The team finishing 13th faced the runner-up of 2019 V.League 2.

Thanh Hoa won the match and would remain in the 2020 V.League 1.

29 October 2019
16:00

Thanh Hoa FC	1–0	Pho Hien FC
Le Van Thang 54'

Vinh Stadium, Nghe An
Referee: Razlan Joffri Bin Ali (Malaysia)

== Attendances ==
=== By club ===
2019 V.League 1 Attendance
Club	Total	Games	Avg. Per Game
DNH. Nam Dinh	195,000	13	15,000
Hanoi FC	105,000	13*	8,077
HA. Gia Lai	109,000	13	8,385
SHB Danang	101,000	13	7,769
Thanh Hoa FC	95,500	13	7,346
Viettel	94,000	13	7,231
SL. Nghe An	91,000	13	7,000
Ho Chi Minh City FC	88,000	13	6,769
S. Khanh Hoa BVN	82,500	13	6,346
Quang Nam FC	81,000	13	6,231
Haiphong FC	81,000	13	6,231
B. Binh Duong	67,700	13	5,208
T. Quang Ninh	67,500	13	5,192
Saigon FC	48,500	13	3,731
Total	1,306,700	182	7,180

=== By round ===
2019 V.League 1 Attendance
Round	Total	Games	Avg. Per Game
Round 1	67,000	7	9,571
Round 2	53,000	7	7,571
Round 3	51,000	7	7,286
Round 4	55,000	7	7,857
Round 5	45,000	7	6,428
Round 6	53,000	7	7,571
Round 7	52,500	7	7,500
Round 8	55,500	7	7,929
Round 9	54,000	7	7,714
Round 10	42,000	7	6,000
Round 11	70,200	7	10,028
Round 12	45,000	7	6,428
Round 13	59,000	7	8,429
Round 14	40,500	7	5,786
Round 15	54,000	7	7,714
Round 16	58,000	7	8,286
Round 17	46,000	7	6,571
Round 18	62,500	7	8,929
Round 19	51,000	7	7,286
Round 20	46,000	7	6,571
Round 21	58,000	7	8,286
Round 22	43,000	7	6,143
Round 23	46,000	7*	6,571
Round 24	36,000	7	5,143
Round 25	42,500	7*	6,071
Round 26	21,000	7	3,000
Total	1.306.700	182	7.180

* Hanoi FC have to play 2 matches in the 23rd and 25th rounds at home without spectators because of a disciplinary decision.

== Season statistics ==
=== Top scorers ===
As of 23 October 2019.

Rank	Player	Club	Goals
1	(Brazil) Bruno Cantanhede	Viettel	15
1	(Senegal) Pape Omar Faye	Hanoi FC	15
3	(Vietnam) Hoang Vu Samson	Hanoi FC / Quang Nam FC	13
4	(Brazil) Pedro Paulo	Saigon FC	12
4	(Vietnam) Tran Minh Vuong	Hoang Anh Gia Lai	12
6	(Vietnam) Đỗ Merlo	SHB Danang	11
6	(Brazil) Diogo Pereira	Duoc Nam Ha Nam Dinh	11
6	(Brazil) Joel Vinicius	Ho Chi Minh City FC / Song Lam Nghe An	11
9	(Russia) Rod Dyachenko	Than Quang Ninh	10
9	(Jamaica) Jermie Lynch	Haiphong FC	10
11	(Vietnam) Dinh Thanh Trung	Quang Nam FC	9
11	(Vietnam) Mc Hong Quan	Than Quang Ninh	9
11	(Vietnam) Nguyen Van Quyet	Hanoi FC	9
11	(Vietnam) Nguyen Van Toan	Hoang Anh Gia Lai	9

=== Top assists ===
As of 26 February 2019

Rank	Player	Club	Assists
1	(Vietnam) Nguyen Van Toan	Hoang Anh Gia Lai	11
2	(Vietnam) Nguyen Van Quyet	Hanoi FC	7

=== Hat-tricks ===
Player	For	Against	Result	Date
(Jamaica) Jeremie Lynch	Haiphong FC	Sanna Khanh Hoa BVN	3–4 (A)	5 March 2019
(Russia) Rod Dyachenko	Than Quang Ninh	Haiphong FC	4–2 (H)	16 June 2019
(Brazil) Joel Vinicius	Song Lam Nghe An	Becamex Binh Duong	1–5 (A)	15 September 2019
(Vietnam) Tran Minh Vuong	Hoang Anh Gia Lai	Haiphong FC	5–1 (H)	20 September 2019
(Vietnam) Le Quoc Phuong	Saigon FC	Duoc Nam Ha Nam Dinh	4–1 (H)	23 October 2019
(Brazil) Bruno Cantanhede^{4}	Viettel	SHB Danang	5–3 (H)	23 October 2019

- Note:

^{4}: scored 4 goals; (H) – Home; (A) – Away

== Awards ==
=== Monthly awards ===
Month	Club of the Month	Manager of the Month		Player of the Month		Goal of the Month		References
Month	Club	Manager	Club	Player	Club	Player	Club	References
April	Hanoi	(Vietnam) Chu Dinh Nghiem	Hanoi FC	(Vietnam) Nguyen Quang Hai	Hanoi FC	(Vietnam) Nguyen Van Toan	Hoang Anh Gia Lai	
May	Ho Chi Minh City	(South Korea) Jung Hae-seong	Ho Chi Minh City FC	(Vietnam) Nguyen Van Toan	Hoang Anh Gia Lai	(Vietnam) Nguyen Trong Hung	Thanh Hoa FC	
June	Thanh Hoa	(Vietnam) Nguyen Duc Thang	Thanh Hoa FC	(Vietnam) Nguyen Hai Huy	Than Quang Ninh	(Vietnam) Vu The Vuong	Duoc Nam Ha Nam Dinh	
July	Duoc Nam Ha Nam Dinh	(Vietnam) Nguyen Van Dung	Duoc Nam Ha Nam Dinh	(Vietnam) Nguyen Van Quyet	Hanoi FC	(Vietnam) Luong Xuan Truong	Hoang Anh Gia Lai	
August	Hanoi	(Vietnam) Chu Dinh Nghiem	Hanoi FC	(Vietnam) Nguyen Van Quyet	Hanoi FC	(Vietnam) Nguyen Quang Hai	Hanoi FC	

=== Annual awards ===
Award	Winner	Club
Manager of the Season	(South Korea) Jung Hae-seong	Ho Chi Minh City FC
Player of the Season	(Vietnam) Nguyen Quang Hai	Hanoi FC
Top Goalscorer	(Brazil) Bruno Cantanhede	Viettel
Top Goalscorer	(Senegal) Pape Omar Faye	Hanoi FC
Top Assist	(Vietnam) Nguyen Van Toan	Hoang Anh Gia Lai
Young Player of the Year	(Vietnam) Doan Van Hau	Hanoi FC
Goal of the Season	(Vietnam) Nghiem Xuan Tu	Than Quang Ninh
Referee of the Year	(Vietnam) Hoang Ngoc Ha	
Assistant Referee of the Year	(Vietnam) Pham Manh Long	

=== Team of the Year ===
Team of the Year
Goalkeeper	(Vietnam) Tran Nguyen Manh (Song Lam Nghe An)			
Defence	(Vietnam) Ho Tan Tai (Becamex Binh Duong)	(Vietnam) Nguyen Huu Tuan (Ho Chi Minh City FC)	(Vietnam) Bui Tien Dung (Viettel)	(Vietnam) Doan Van Hau (Hanoi FC)
Midfield	(Vietnam) Nguyen Van Quyet (Hanoi FC)	(Vietnam) Mac Hong Quan (Than Quang Ninh)	(Vietnam) Tran Minh Vuong (Hoang Anh Gia Lai)	(Vietnam) Nguyen Quang Hai (Hanoi FC)
Attack	(Vietnam) Nguyen Van Toan (Hoang Anh Gia Lai)		(Senegal) Pape Omar Faye (Hanoi FC)	

== See also ==
- 2019 V.League 2
- 2019 Vietnamese National Football Second League
- 2019 Vietnamese National Football Third League
