= Nghiem =

Nghiem may refer to:

== People ==
- Chu Đình Nghiêm, Vietnamese footballer and coach
- Lê Văn Nghiêm, Vietnamese soldier
- Nghiêm Xuân Tú, Vietnamese footballer
- Nguyễn Tư Nghiêm, Vietnamese painter
- Saran Nghiem (born 2003), English squash player
- Son Van Nghiem, American engineer

== Places ==
- Vĩnh Nghiêm Pagoda
