= Nguyễn Văn Công =

Vietnamese footballer

Personal information
- Full name: Nguyễn Văn Công
- Date of birth: 1 August 1992 (age 34)
- Place of birth: Quỳ Hợp, Nghệ An, Vietnam
- Height: 1.82 m (6 ft 0 in)
- Position: Goalkeeper

Team information
- Current team: Bắc Ninh
- Number: 1

Youth career
- 2006–2012: Hà Nội

Senior career*
Years	Team	Apps	(Gls)
2013–2023	Hà Nội	97	(0)
2023–2025	Quảng Nam	45	(0)
2025–2026	Becamex Hồ Chí Minh City	1	(0)
2026–	Bắc Ninh	2	(0)
- * Club domestic league appearances and goals as of 20 September 2026

Nguyễn Văn Công (born 1 August 1992) is a Vietnamese professional footballer who plays as a goalkeeper for V.League 1 club Bắc Ninh.

== Honours ==
Hà Nội

- V.League 1: 2013, 2016, 2018, 2019, 2022; Runner-up: 2012, 2014, 2015, 2020
- Vietnamese National Cup: 2019, 2020, 2022; Runner-up: 2012, 2015, 2016
- Vietnamese Super Cup: 2018, 2019, 2020, 2022; Runner-up: 2014, 2016, 2017
