= Wander Luiz (footballer, born 1992) =

Brazilian footballer

Personal information
- Full name: Wander Luiz Queiroz Dias
- Date of birth: 17 February 1992 (age 34)
- Place of birth: Espírito Santo, Brazil
- Height: 1.88 m (6 ft 2 in)
- Position: Forward

Team information
- Current team: Chanthaburi
- Number: 9

Senior career*
Years	Team	Apps	(Gls)
2014–2015	Vitória da Conquista		
2015–2016	Santa Rita		
2016–2017	Vitória da Conquista	6	(1)
2017	Long An	12	(5)
2018	Quang Nam	2	(0)
2018	Can Tho	7	(5)
2019	Becamex Binh Duong	22	(6)
2020–2021	Persib Bandung	20	(10)
2022	PSS Sleman	16	(5)
2022–2023	RANS Nusantara	19	(4)
2023	Desportiva Ferroviária	3	(0)
2023–2024	Chanthaburi	21	(10)
2024	Ho Chi Minh City	3	(1)
2025	Gokulam Kerala	1	(0)
2025	Chanthaburi	12	(5)
- * Club domestic league appearances and goals as of 24 December 2025

Wander Luiz Queiroz Dias (born 17 February 1992) is a Brazilian professional footballer who plays as a forward for Thai League 2 club Chanthaburi.

== Club career ==
=== Long An ===
In 2017, Luiz signed for Long An and was given jersey number 79. He made his league debut on 24 June 2017 against Ho Chi Minh City. On 10 September, Luiz scored his first goal for the club, scoring in a 2–3 lose over Quang Nam in the 2017 V.League 1.

=== Quang Nam ===
In 2018, Luiz left Long An for Quang Nam. He made his league debut on 10 March 2018 against Saigon. He only made two appearances with the club.

=== Can Tho ===
After leaving Quang Nam, Luiz joined Can Tho. He made his league debut on 22 March 2018 against Becamex Binh Duong. On 15 April, Luiz scored his first two goals for the club in a 3–3 draw over Song Lam Nghe An.

=== Becamex Binh Duong ===
In 2019, Luiz signed for Becamex Binh Duong. He made his league debut on 21 February 2019 against Dong A Thanh Hoa. On 12 March, Luiz scored his first international goal for the team, scoring in a 1–3 lose over Philippines Football League club Ceres-Negros in the 2019 AFC Cup group stage. On 3 April, he scored in a 1–2 win over Myanmar National League club Shan United in the AFC Cup. Five days later, he scored his league goal for the club, scoring in a 1–0 win over Viettel in the 2019 V.League 1.

=== Persib Bandung ===
On 10 February 2020, Luiz moved to Indonesia and signed one-year contract with Liga 1 club Persib Bandung. He made his league debut for Persib Bandung on 1 March in a win 3–0 against Persela Lamongan. He also scored his first goal for Persib with scored a brace in 2020 Liga 1, where he scored in the 54th and 70th minutes. On 8 March, Luiz scored in a 1–2 win over Arema, and on 15 March he scored in a 2–1 over PSS Sleman; the latter result saw Persib Bandung move to 1st position in the league table, the first time under Robert Alberts. And then, this season was suspended on 27 March 2020 due to the COVID-19 pandemic. The season was abandoned and was declared void on 20 January 2021.

==== 2021 season ====
On 4 September, Luiz made his debut of the new league season match against Barito Putera at the Indomilk Arena, Tangerang. On 22 October, Luiz scored his first league goals of the season with scored two goals in a 4–2 win over PSS Sleman at the Manahan Stadium. Eight days later, Luiz scored a brace in a 3–0 win against Persipura Jayapura, the latter result saw Persib Bandung move to 1st position in the league table. On 16 December, PT Persib Bermartabat revealed that Luiz would leave the club at the end of the first round of Liga 1 in December.

=== PSS Sleman ===
On 26 December 2021, Luiz signed a contract with PSS Sleman. On 13 January 2022, Luiz made his league debut in 0–2 lose against Arema at the Kapten I Wayan Dipta Stadium.

=== Ho Chi Minh City ===
On 26 February 2024, Luiz made his return to Vietnam, signing for Ho Chi Minh City.

== Honours ==
=== Club ===
Quảng Nam

- Vietnamese Super Cup: 2017
