= Udoka =

- Gender: Unisex
- Language: Igbo

Origin
- Word/name: Nigeria
- Meaning: Peace is great

Udoka audio is a Nigerian given name and surname. Notable people with the name include:

== Given name ==
- Udoka Azubuike (born 1999), Nigerian-American basketball player
- Udoka Chima (born 2002), Nigerian footballer
- Udoka Godwin-Malife (born 2000), English footballer
- Udoka Oyeka (born 1970), Nigerian actor and director

== Surname ==
- Chinedu Udoka (born 1992), Nigerian footballer
- Ime Udoka (born 1977), Nigerian-American basketball coach and former player
- Mfon Udoka (born 1976), Nigerian-American basketball player, sister of Ime Udoka
