= Tô Vĩnh Lợi =

Vietnamese footballer (born 1985)

Personal information
- Full name: Tô Vĩnh Lợi
- Date of birth: 22 April 1985 (age 41)
- Place of birth: Quy Nhơn, Bình Định, Vietnam
- Height: 1.84 m (6 ft 0 in)
- Position: Goalkeeper

Youth career
- 1998–2004: Bình Định

Senior career*
Years	Team	Apps	(Gls)
2005–2011	Bình Định	88	(0)
2012–2016	Thanh Hóa	88	(0)
2016–2018	Hoàng Anh Gia Lai	30	(0)
2018–2019	XSKT Cần Thơ	24	(0)
2019–2020	Thanh Hóa	3	(0)

International career^{‡}
2000–2001	Vietnam U16	15	(0)
2005–2006	Vietnam U23	23	(0)
2014–2017	Vietnam	3	(0)
- * Club domestic league appearances and goals as of 7 July 2019 ‡ National team caps and goals as of 24 May 2015

Tô Vĩnh Lợi (born 22 April 1985) is a former Vietnamese footballer who last played as a goalkeeper for V.League 1 club Thanh Hóa and Vietnam national football team.
