= Bruno Cantanhede =

Brazilian footballer (born 1993)

Personal information
- Full name: Bruno Cunha Cantanhede
- Date of birth: 22 July 1993 (age 33)
- Place of birth: São Luís, Brazil
- Height: 1.85 m (6 ft 1 in)
- Position: Striker

Team information
- Current team: Bac Ninh
- Number: 86

Youth career
- 2005: PSTC
- 2009: Atlético-PR
- 2010: São Paulo

Senior career*
Years	Team	Apps	(Gls)
2011–2015	São Paulo	1	(0)
2013	→ Noroeste (loan)	7	(0)
2014	→ Paulista (loan)	3	(0)
2015	→ Rio Claro (loan)	8	(1)
2015–2017	Ironi Kiryat Shmona	27	(4)
2017	→ Paraná (loan)	9	(2)
2017	Daejeon Hana Citizen	18	(4)
2018	Anyang	11	(0)
2019–2020	Viettel	33	(25)
2021	Hanoi	8	(3)
2022	Persib Bandung	15	(5)
2022	Al-Mesaimeer	0	(0)
2023	Dong A Thanh Hoa	20	(11)
2023–2024	Viettel	9	(2)
2024–2025	Rayong	14	(4)
2025	Calicut	1	(0)
2026–	Bac Ninh	10	(10)
- * Club domestic league appearances and goals as of 30 May 2026

Bruno Cunha Cantanhede (born 22 July 1993) is a Brazilian professional footballer who plays as a striker for V.League 2 club Bac Ninh.

== Career ==
In June 2019, Cantanhede moved to Vietnam and signed with V.League 1 side Viettel. He made his club debut on 16 June, scoring his first goal for Viettel in a 1–0 away win over Khanh Hoa in the V.League 1. Cantanhede scored four goals in a 5–3 win against SHB Da Nang on the last day of the season, while also winning the V.League 1 top goalscorer alongside Pape Omar Faye with 15 goals.

== Honours ==
Hapoel Kiryat Shmona

- Israel Super Cup: 2015

Viettel

- V.League 1: 2020
- Vietnamese Cup runner-up: 2020

Hanoi FC

- Vietnamese Super Cup: 2020

Dong A Thanh Hoa

- Vietnamese National Cup: 2023

Individual

- V.League 1 Top goalscorer: 2019
