= Trịnh Văn Lợi =

Vietnamese footballer

Personal information
- Full name: Trịnh Văn Lợi
- Date of birth: 26 May 1995 (age 31)
- Place of birth: Yên Định, Thanh Hóa, Vietnam
- Height: 1.80 m (5 ft 11 in)
- Position: Center-back

Team information
- Current team: Thanh Hóa
- Number: 15

Youth career
- 2006–2014: FLC Thanh Hóa

Senior career*
Years	Team	Apps	(Gls)
2015–2017	FLC Thanh Hóa	8	(0)
2017–2019	Hải Phòng	28	(1)
2019–	Thanh Hóa	99	(5)
- * Club domestic league appearances and goals as of 12 June 2026

Trịnh Văn Lợi (born 26 May 1995) is a Vietnamese professional footballer who plays as a center-back for V.League 1 side Thanh Hóa.

== Career statistics ==
=== Club ===
As of 20 August 2018.

Club	Season	League			Cup		Continental		Other		Total	
Club	Season	Division	Apps	Goals	Apps	Goals	Apps	Goals	Apps	Goals	Apps	Goals
FLC Thanh Hóa	2015	V.League 1	3	0	0	0	–		0	0	3	0
FLC Thanh Hóa	2016	V.League 1	5	0	0	0	–		0	0	5	0
FLC Thanh Hóa	Total		8	0	0	0	0	0	0	0	8	0
Hải Phòng	2017	V.League 1	12	0	0	0	–		0	0	12	0
Hải Phòng	2018	V.League 1	16	0	0	0	–		0	0	16	0
Hải Phòng	Total		28	0	0	0	0	0	0	0	28	0
Career total			36	0	0	0	0	0	0	0	36	0

== Honours ==
=== Club ===
Đông Á Thanh Hóa

- Vietnamese National Cup: 2023, 2023–24
