= Lục Xuân Hưng =

Vietnamese footballer (born 1995)

Personal information
- Full name: Lục Xuân Hưng
- Date of birth: 15 April 1995 (age 31)
- Place of birth: Sông Mã, Sơn La, Vietnam
- Height: 1.81 m (5 ft 11 in)
- Position: Center back

Team information
- Current team: Đông Á Thanh Hóa
- Number: 5

Youth career
- 2007–2014: Thanh Hóa

Senior career*
Years	Team	Apps	(Gls)
2015–2022	Thanh Hóa	36	(0)
2020	→ SHB Đà Nẵng (loan)	0	(0)
2023	PVF-CAND	1	(0)
2023–2024	Trường Tươi Bình Phước	12	(0)
2024–2025	Quy Nhơn Bình Định	18	(0)
2025–	Đông Á Thanh Hóa	5	(0)

International career^{‡}
2014–2015	Vietnam U19	8	(0)
Medal record
Men's football
Representing Vietnam
AFF Championship
Winner	2018
- * Club domestic league appearances and goals as of 7 June 2026 ‡ National team caps and goals as of 13 November 2020

Lục Xuân Hưng (born 15 April 1995) is a Vietnamese professional footballer who plays as a center back for V.League 1 club Đông Á Thanh Hóa.

Xuân Hưng was named by Park Hang-seo in Vietnam national team squad for the 2018 AFF Championship. Vietnam won the tournament, but Xuân Hưng didn't make any appearances. He, along with goalkeepers Nguyễn Tuấn Mạnh and Bùi Tiến Dũng were the only players of the Vietnam squad who didn't play any matches in the tournament. He was also named in the preliminary squad for the 2019 AFC Asian Cup, but withdrew after suffering an anterior cruciate ligament injury during training.

== Honours ==
Vietnam

- AFF Championship: 2018
