= Thiago Papel =

Brazilian footballer

Personal information
- Full name: Thiago Santos de Melo
- Date of birth: 30 December 1991 (age 34)
- Place of birth: Sergipe, Brazil
- Height: 1.88 m (6 ft 2 in)
- Position: Defender

Team information
- Current team: Song Lam Nghe An
- Number: 5

Youth career
- 2005–2010: Guarani

Senior career*
Years	Team	Apps	(Gls)
2011–2015	Guarani	0	(0)
2011–2012	→ River Plate-SE (loan)	2	(0)
2014	→ Coruripe (loan)	4	(0)
2015–2016	Coruripe	6	(0)
2016	Sergipe	6	(0)
2017–2019	Quảng Nam	55	(5)
2020	Nam Định	13	(0)
2021–	Saigon	11	(0)
- * Club domestic league appearances and goals as of 12:08, 8 April 2019 (UTC)

Thiago Santos de Melo (born 30 December 1991), also known as Thiago Papel, also referred to as Trường An, is a Brazilian footballer who currently plays as a defender for V.League 1 side Sông Lam Nghệ An.

== Career statistics ==
=== Club ===
As of 8 April 2019.

Club	Season	League			National Cup		League Cup		Other		Total	
Club	Season	Division	Apps	Goals	Apps	Goals	Apps	Goals	Apps	Goals	Apps	Goals
Guarani	2011	–			0	0	0	0	3 (Note: Appearances in Campeonato Mineiro)	0	3	0
Guarani	2012	–			0	0	0	0	0	0	0	0
Guarani	2013	–			0	0	0	0	7	1	7	1
Guarani	2014	–			0	0	0	0	10	0	10	0
Guarani	2015	–			0	0	0	0	10	0	10	0
Guarani	Total		0	0	0	0	0	0	30	1	30	1
River Plate-SE (loan)	2011	Série D	2	0	0	0	0	0	0	0	2	0
River Plate-SE (loan)	2012	Série D	0	0	1 (Note: Appearance in Copa do Brasil)	0	0	0	0	0	1	0
River Plate-SE (loan)	Total		2	0	1	0	0	0	0	0	3	0
Coruripe (loan)	2014	Série D	4	0	0	0	0	0	4 (Note: Appearances in Campeonato Alagoano)	1	8	1
Coruripe	2015	Série D	6	0	1	0	0	0	10	3	17	3
Coruripe	2016	Série D	0	0	2	0	5 (Note: Appearances in Copa do Nordeste)	0	11	0	18	0
Coruripe	Total		10	0	3	0	5	0	25	0	43	4
Sergipe	2016	Série D	6	0	0	0	0	0	0	0	6	0
QNK Quảng Nam	2017	V.League 1	24	3	0	0	–		0	0	24	3
QNK Quảng Nam	2018	V.League 1	18	2	0	0	–		1 (Note: Appearances in Vietnamese National Football Super Cup)	1	19	3
QNK Quảng Nam	2019	V.League 1	4	0	0	0	–		0	0	4	0
QNK Quảng Nam	Total		46	5	0	0	0	0	1	1	47	5
Career total			64	5	4	0	5	0	56	6	127	11

== Achievements ==
=== Club ===
Quảng Nam

- V.League 1:

(gold) Winners : 2017
