= Rod Dyachenko =

Russian footballer

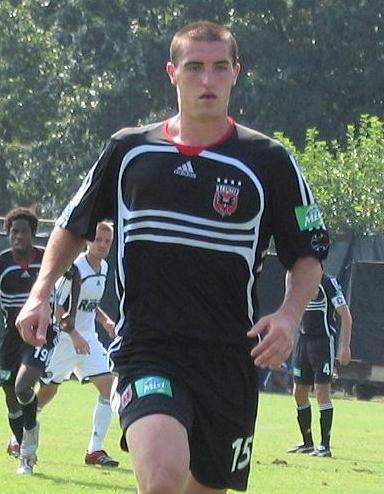

Personal information
- Full name: Rodion Sergeyevich Dyachenko
- Date of birth: 22 September 1983 (age 43)
- Place of birth: Georgiyevsk, Soviet Union
- Height: 1.83 m (6 ft 0 in)
- Position: Forward

College career
Years	Team	Apps	(Gls)
2002–2005	UNLV Rebels		

Senior career*
Years	Team	Apps	(Gls)
2006–2008	D.C. United	41	(1)
2009	Minnesota Thunder	27	(2)
2010	Real Maryland Monarchs	6	(0)
2011	Samut Songkhram	1	(0)
2012–2013	Pattaya United	30	(8)
2014	Samut Songkhram	11	(0)
2015	Putrajaya SPA	10	(3)
2016	Than Quang Ninh	24	(12)
2017	Ho Chi Minh City	11	(4)
2017	Than Quang Ninh	12	(12)
2018	Can Tho FC	2	(0)
2019	Than Quang Ninh	21	(10)
- * Club domestic league appearances and goals as of 23 October 2019

Rodion Sergeyevich Dyachenko (Родион Сергеевич Дьяченко; born 22 September 1983 in Georgiyevsk) is a Russian former footballer who played as a forward.

== Career ==
=== Youth and college ===
Dyachenko was born in the Russian SFSR in the Soviet Union prior to the breakup of the country in the early 1990s. After moving with his family to the United States as a child, Dyachenko attended Mountain View High School in Vancouver, Washington, played club soccer with West Villa Thunder, FC Portland and Westside Metros and played college soccer with the University of Nevada, Las Vegas from 2002 to 2005, scoring 23 goals in those four years.

=== Professional ===
Dyachenko was selected in the third round (31st overall) in the 2006 MLS SuperDraft by D.C. United, but did not play regularly with the team in his first year in the league, He was selected in the 2006 MLS Expansion Draft by Toronto FC, but was re-acquired by D.C. in February 2007 in a trade for a first round pick in the 2008 MLS SuperDraft, after he ran into difficulty obtaining permission to work in Canada: Dyachenko holds a U.S. green card, allowing him to be counted as an American domestic player under MLS roster rules, but no passport from any country. Dyachenko was released by D.C. in January 2009 after playing 41 games and scoring one goal for the team.

On February 26, 2009, the Minnesota Thunder announced the signing of Dyachenko to a two-year contract. He played 27 games and scored 2 goals for the team in his debut season, but along with the rest of the Minnesota Thunder team had his contract terminated in December 2009.

In November 2009 Dyachenko signed to play professional indoor soccer for Baltimore Blast in the Major Indoor Soccer League during the 2009/10 USL-1 offseason.

== Honors ==
D.C. United

- Major League Soccer Supporter's Shield: 2007
- Lamar Hunt U.S. Open Cup: 2008

Than Quang Ninh

- Vietnamese Cup: 2016
