= Kayo Dias =

Brazilian footballer

Personal information
- Full name: Kayo César Dias Sanches Borges
- Date of birth: 22 April 1990 (age 36)
- Place of birth: Campo Grande, Brazil
- Height: 1.88 m (6 ft 2 in)
- Position: Midfielder

Team information
- Current team: Thể Công
- Number: 90

Senior career*
Years	Team	Apps	(Gls)
2011	Icasa	0	(0)
2012	Junior Team		
2013	Maringá		
2014	Comercial-MS		
2015	Volta Redonda	0	(0)
2016	Operário-MS		
2016	CEOV Operário	0	(0)
2016–2017	Cuiabá	3	(0)
2017	Comercial-MS	2	(0)
2018	Democrata-GV	0	(0)
2018	São Carlos	0	(0)
2019	Viettel	12	(0)
- * Club domestic league appearances and goals as of 16 June 2019

Kayo César Dias Sanches Borges (born 22 April 1990), commonly known as Kayo Dias, is a Brazilian footballer who currently plays as a midfielder for V.League 1 side Thể Công .

== Career statistics ==
=== Club ===
As of 26 March 2019.

Club	Season	League			Cup		Other		Total	
Club	Season	Division	Apps	Goals	Apps	Goals	Apps	Goals	Apps	Goals
Icasa	2011	Série B	0	0	0	0	0	0	0	0
Volta Redonda	2015	Série D	0	0	1 (Note: Appearances in the Copa Rio)	0	4 (Note: Appearances in the Campeonato Carioca)	0	5	0
CEOV Operário	2016	–			2 (Note: Appearances in the Copa do Brasil)	0	0	0	2	0
Cuiabá	2016	Série C	3	0	0	0	0	0	3	0
Cuiabá	2017	Série C	0	0	0	0	0	0	0	0
Cuiabá	Total		3	0	0	0	0	0	3	0
Comercial-MS	2017	Série D	2	0	0	0	0	0	2	0
Democrata-GV	2018	–			0	0	9 (Note: Appearances in the Campeonato Mineiro)	1	9	1
São Carlos	2018	–			0	0	2 (Note: Appearances in the Campeonato Paulista Série A3)	1	2	1
Viettel	2019	V.League 1	3	0	0	0	0	0	3	0
Career total			8	0	3	0	15	2	26	2
