= Nghiêm Xuân Tú =

Vietnamese footballer (born 1988)

Personal information
- Date of birth: 28 August 1988 (age 38)
- Place of birth: Hanoi, Vietnam
- Height: 1.76 m (5 ft 9 in)
- Position: Attacking midfielder

Youth career
- –2010: Hòa Phát Hà Nội

Senior career*
Years	Team	Apps	(Gls)
2010	Hòa Phát V&V		
2013–2014	Thanh Hóa	34	(3)
2015–2021	Than Quảng Ninh	150	(16)
2020	→ Hải Phòng (loan)	7	(0)
2022–2024	Merryland Quy Nhơn Bình Định	34	(0)
2024–2025	Becamex Bình Dương	8	(0)
2025–2026	Quảng Ninh	12	(1)
Total		245	(20)

International career
2016–2017	Vietnam	1	(0)
- * Club domestic league appearances and goals

Nghiêm Xuân Tú (born 28 August 1988) is a former Vietnamese professional footballer who played as an attacking midfielder. He had one cap for the Vietnam national team

== Background ==
Nghiêm Xuân Tú was born in 1988 in Hanoi. He is the son of former player Nghiêm Xuân Mạnh, who previously coached Hòa Phát Hà Nội.

== Career ==
Nghiêm Xuân Tú was trained at the Hòa Phát Hà Nội academy. He played for Hòa Phát V&V in the 2010 Vietnamese Second Division, but had to take a temporary break after being diagnosed with colon cancer. After defeating the disease, Xuân Tú returned to play "phủi" (amateur 7-a-side football) and became a phenomenon in the amateur football scene in Hanoi.

In early May 2013, coach Mai Đức Chung invited him for a trial at Thanh Hóa. After just four days of trial, he was signed by the team. On 11 May 2013, in a match where Thanh Hóa hosted Sông Lam Nghệ An, Xuân Tú made his professional debut when he was substituted in at the 61st minute; he took only 5 minutes to score the goal that sealed a 2–1 victory for the home team. He finished the 2013 season with 13 appearances in the V.League, mostly from the bench. In the 2014 season, he started more matches but did not leave a significant mark.

Joining Than Quảng Ninh in the 2015 season was a major turning point in Tú's career. Here, he had the opportunity to reach his full potential. In Round 24 of the 2015 V.League 1, he scored the first hat-trick of his career, helping Than Quảng Ninh defeat Sanna Khánh Hòa BVN 5–0 in Nha Trang. The 2015–2016 period left many impressions in Xuân Tú's football career. In addition to helping Than Quảng Ninh win the 2016 Vietnamese Cup, he also achieved personal success such as the "King of Assists" title, being named in the V.League Best XI, and the club's Player of the Season. In late 2016, he became the first Vietnamese player invited to Germany for trials with 1. FC Kaiserslautern and Fortuna Düsseldorf.

In the 2018 V.League 1, Xuân Tú provided 17 assists for his teammates, a record number in the history of the tournament. This record also helped him appear in the V.League 1 Best XI for the second time.

In October 2021, Xuân Tú was officially transferred to Bình Định.

After four years playing for Bình Định, in September 2025, Xuân Tú officially joined V.League 2 club Quảng Ninh. This marked Nghiêm Xuân Tú's return to a club from Quảng Ninh province, playing for a different club than the dissolved Than Quảng Ninh where he previously played. At the end of the 2025–26 season, Xuân Tú announced his retirement on 1 September 2026.

== Personal life ==
In early 2014, Nghiêm Xuân Tú married singer Phạm Thanh Thủy after 10 months of dating. Currently, the couple has two sons: Nghiêm Xuân Tùng (born 2014) and Nghiêm Xuân Tùng Anh (born 2018). Xuân Tú is also the older brother of Nghiêm Mạnh Hiếu (born 2004), who plays for the Hanoi FC U-19 team.

Off the pitch, Xuân Tú is considered a 'fashion icon' among Vietnamese players. This prompted him to reach out to Vietnamese fashion brand Kamito for a collaboration called the "NXT77 x KAMITO" collection. Additionally, he is frequently invited to television football commentary due to his articulateness and in-depth knowledge.

== Honours ==
Than Quảng Ninh

- Vietnamese Cup: 2016
- Vietnamese Super Cup: 2017

Topenland Bình Định

- Vietnamese Cup runner-up: 2022

Individual

- V.League 1 Team of the Season: 2016, 2018
