= Son Van Nghiem =

American engineer

Son Van Nghiem is an engineer at the California Institute of Technology in Pasadena, California. He was named a Fellow of the Institute of Electrical and Electronics Engineers (IEEE) in 2015 for his contributions to cryospheric sciences and Earth remote sensing applications. He was named a Fellow of the American Geophysical Union in 2019.
