= Đinh Hồng Vinh =

Vietnamese former footballer and manager

Personal information
- Full name: Đinh Hồng Vinh
- Date of birth: 1974 (age 51–52)
- Place of birth: Bình Định, South Vietnam
- Position: Defender

Team information
- Current team: Vietnam U23 (caretaker coach)

Youth career
- 1990–1992: Bình Định

Senior career*
Years	Team	Apps	(Gls)
1992–2002	Hoàng Anh Gia Lai		

Managerial career
- 2002–2018: Hoàng Anh Gia Lai (youth)
- 2007: Vietnam U16
- 2009: Vietnam U19
- 2017: Vietnam U20 (assistant)
- 2018–2019: Cần Thơ
- 2019: Vietnam U23 (assistant)
- 2024–: Vietnam (assistant)
- 2024–: Vietnam U23 (assistant)
Medal record
Representing Vietnam (as manager)
ASEAN U-16 Boys' Championship
Bronze medal – third place	Phnom Penh 2007
ASEAN U-19 Boys' Championship
Bronze medal – third place	Ho Chi Minh City 2009
- * Club domestic league appearances and goals

Đinh Hồng Vinh (born 1974) is a Vietnamese former footballer and manager, who is currently the assistant coach of the Vietnam national team.

== Playing career ==
Being a youth product of Bình Định, Hồng Vinh joined Hoàng Anh Gia Lai in 1992 and made his senior debut there. He remained at the club during his entire career. In the 2001–02 Vietnam First Division, Hoàng Anh Gia Lai finished third and promoted to the 2003 V-League. However, Hồng Vinh suffered an anterior cruciate ligament injury, the second in his career. Therefore, he retired from playing football at the end of that season.

== Coaching career ==
Following his retirement from playing in 2022, Hồng Vinh transferred to work as a coach at Hoàng Anh Gia Lai youth teams, and remained there until 2018.

He was assistant to head coach Hoàng Anh Tuấn with the Vietnam U20 competing in the 2017 FIFA U-20 World Cup, then as assistant to coach Park Hang-seo with Vietnam U23 in 2019.

Thereafter, he was the head coach of V.League 2 team Cần Thơ between 2018 and 2019, before being appointed as the chairman of V.League 2 side Bà Rịa-Vũng Tàu in 2019. He managed in the Vietnamese V.League 1.

In August 2024, Hồng Vinh was appointed as the caretaker coach of Vietnam U22 to participate in the 2024 CFA Team China, at the proposal of head coach Kim Sang-sik. He was then added to Kim Sang-sik's assistant coach list at the Vietnam national team, and was part of the staff as Vietnam won the 2024 ASEAN Championship.
