= 2016 Vietnamese Cup =

2016 Vietnamese National Cup
Vietnamese FA Cup

Tournament details
- Country: Vietnam
- Teams: 24

Final positions
- Champions: Than Quảng Ninh
- Runners-up: Hà Nội T&T

The 2016 National Cup was the 24th edition of the Vietnamese National Cup. It was sponsored by Kienlongbank, and known as the Kienlongbank National Cup for sponsorship purposes. This year's competition, which features 24 teams including V.League 1's 14 teams and National First Division's 10 teams, ran until September 29.

== Round one ==
| 2 April 2016 | Bình Phước (2) | 0-2 | Than Quảng Ninh (1) |

| 2 April 2016 | Đắk Lắk (2) | 0-1 | Cà Mau (2) |

| 2 April 2016 | Sông Lam Nghệ An (1) | 1-0 | Sanna Khánh Hòa (1) |

| 2 April 2016 | Nam Định (2) | 2-0 | Phú Yên (2) |

| 2 April 2016 | QNK Quảng Nam (1) | 4-1 | CLB bóng đá Huế (2) |

| 2 April 2016 | Đồng Nai (2) | 1-2 | Fico Tây Ninh (2) |

| 2 April 2016 | Thanh Hóa (1) | 1-1 (5 – 3 p) | Hồ Chí Minh City (2) |

| 2 April 2016 | Hoàng Anh Gia Lai (1) | 2-1 | Viettel (2) |

== Round two ==
| 10 June 2016 | Nam Định (2) | 1-0 | XSKT Cần Thơ (1) |

| 10 June 2016 | QNK Quảng Nam (1) | 2-1 | Sài Gòn (1) |

| 10 June 2016 | Hoàng Anh Gia Lai (1) | 1-0 | SHB Đà Nẵng (1) |

| 10 June 2016 | Hải Phòng (1) | 2-1 | Sông Lam Nghệ An (1) |

| 10 June 2016 | Long An (1) | 4-1 | Fico Tây Ninh (2) |

| 10 June 2016 | Becamex Bình Dương (1) | 5-1 | Cà Mau (2) |

| 10 June 2016 | Hà Nội T&T (1) | 1-0 | Thanh Hóa (1) |

| 10 June 2016 | Than Quảng Ninh (1) | 2-0 | Đồng Tháp (1) |

== Quarter-finals ==
=== 1st Legs ===
| 14 June 2016 | Nam Định (2) | 0-0 | Hà Nội T&T (1) |

| 14 June 2016 | Hải Phòng (1) | 1-1 | QNK Quảng Nam (1) |

| 14 June 2016 | Becamex Bình Dương (1) | 5-3 | Hoàng Anh Gia Lai (1) |

| 14 June 2016 | Than Quảng Ninh (1) | 1-1 | Long An (1) |

=== 2nd Legs ===
| 29 June 2016 | Hà Nội T&T (1) | 3-1 | Nam Định (2) |

Hà Nội T&T 3-1 on aggregate

| 29 June 2016 | QNK Quảng Nam (1) | 3-0 | Hải Phòng (1) |

QNK Quảng Nam 4-1 on aggregate

| 29 June 2016 | Hoàng Anh Gia Lai (1) | 1-3 | Becamex Bình Dương (1) |

Becamex Bình Dương 8-4 on aggregate

| 29 June 2016 | Long An (1) | 2-2 | Than Quảng Ninh (1) |

Than Quảng Ninh 3-3 on aggregate

== Semi-finals ==
=== 1st Legs ===
| 20 July 2016 | Becamex Bình Dương (1) | 1-1 | Than Quảng Ninh (1) |

| 20 July 2016 | QNK Quảng Nam (1) | 2-3 | Hà Nội T&T (1) |

=== 2nd Legs ===
| 3 August 2016 | Than Quảng Ninh (1) | 0–0 | Becamex Bình Dương (1) |

Than Quảng Ninh 1-1 on aggregate

| 3 August 2016 | Hà Nội T&T (1) | 4–3 | QNK Quảng Nam (1) |

Hà Nội T&T 7–5 on aggregate

== Finals ==
=== 1st Legs ===
| 24 September 2016 | Than Quảng Ninh (1) | 4–4 | Hà Nội T&T (1) |

=== 2nd Legs ===
| 29 September 2016 | Hà Nội T&T (1) | 1–2 | Than Quảng Ninh (1) |

Than Quảng Ninh 6–5 on aggregate
