= Ganiyu Oseni =

Nigerian footballer

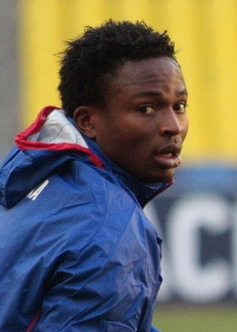

Personal information
- Full name: Ganiyu Bolayi Oseni
- Date of birth: 19 September 1991 (age 35)
- Place of birth: Osogbo, Nigeria
- Height: 1.77 m (5 ft 10 in)
- Position: Forward

Youth career
- 2000–2007: Prime

Senior career*
Years	Team	Apps	(Gls)
2007–2008	Prime		
2008	→ Esperance Tunis (loan)	2	(0)
2008–2009	→ CSKA Moscow (loan)	0	(0)
2010–2013	Esperance Tunis		
2011–2012	→ Kien Giang (loan)	45	(20)
2013	→ Hoang Anh Gia Lai (loan)	19	(10)
2013–2014	Kahramanmaraşspor	9	(7)
2014	Long An	11	(6)
2015	Becamex Binh Dương	3	(1)
2015–2017	Can Tho	39	(14)
2017	Long An	11	(3)
2017–2019	Hanoi FC	53	(41)
2020	Ararat Yerevan	8	(0)
2020	Kazma	0	(0)
2021–2022	Oman Club		
2022	Song Lam Nghe An	21	(6)
2023	Binh Dinh	1	(0)

International career^{‡}
2007	Nigeria U-17	6	(3)
2011	Nigeria U-23	1	(2)
- * Club domestic league appearances and goals as of 2 July 2023 ‡ National team caps and goals as of 1 May 2011

Ganiyu Bolaji Oseni (born 19 September 1991) is a Nigerian professional footballer who plays as a forward.

== Career ==
In his native Nigeria, Oseni started his career at Prime. He had a trial with Esperance Tunis on 29 March 2008 and played two CLP-1 games. He returned to Prime and was loaned out on 2 August 2008 to CSKA Moscow, after a successful trial in July 2008. In January 2009, he joined CSKA on permanent transfer but left his club on 4 December 2009 for trials in Tunisia. He signed on 7 December 2009 a three-and-a-half-year contract with his former club Esperance.

He went on loan to Kiên Giang in Vietnam in March 2011.

In October 2012, Oseni play for Hoang Anh Gia Lai of the V-League.

In April 2014, Oseni made his return to Vietnam when he signed with V.League 1 side Đồng Tâm Long An.

On 29 February 2020, he moved to the Armenian Premier League side Ararat Yerevan. In mid-August, he moved to Kuwaiti club Kazma SC, which he played for until his contract was terminated on 7 October 2020. At the end of December 2020, he signed a deal with Omani side Oman Club.

== International career ==
In the 2007 FIFA U-17 World Cup in South Korea, Oseni played 6 matches and scored one goal as Nigeria won the tournament. He was called up for the Nigeria U-23 All Africa Games qualifier in April 2011 and scored a brace in the 6–1 win over Liberia.

== Honours ==
Becamex Bình Dương

• Mekong Club Championship: 2014

Hanoi FC

- V.League 1: 2018
- Vietnamese Super Cup: 2018

Nigeria U17

- FIFA U-17 World Cup: 2007

Individual

- V.League 1 Best Foreign Player of the Year: 2018
