= Nguyễn Đức Thắng (footballer, born 1976) =

Vietnamese footballer (born 1976)

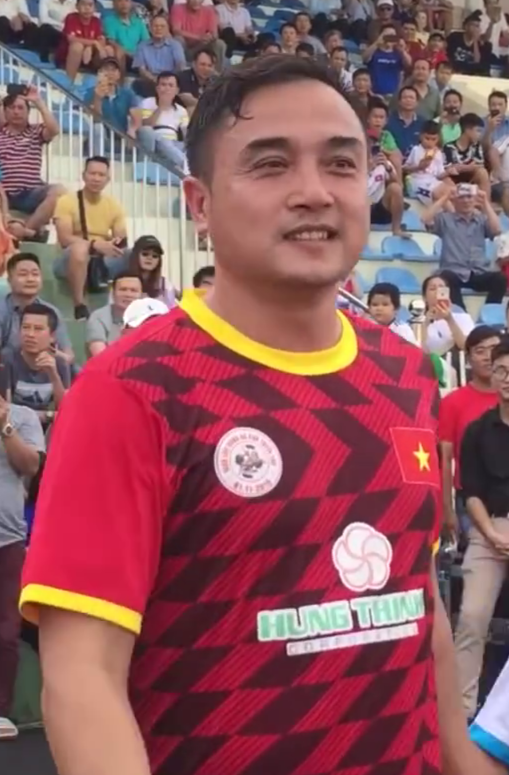
- Đức Thắng in 2019

Personal information
- Full name: Nguyễn Đức Thắng
- Date of birth: 28 May 1976 (age 50)
- Place of birth: Hanoi, Vietnam
- Height: 1.74 m (5 ft 9 in)
- Position: Left-back

Team information
- Current team: Thể Công-Viettel (manager)

Senior career*
Years	Team	Apps	(Gls)
1993–2005	Thể Công	221	(18)

International career
1997–2004	Vietnam	32	(3)

Managerial career
- 2009: Vietnam (assistant)
- 2013–2014: Công An Hà Nội
- 2015–2017: Sài Gòn
- 2018–2019: FLC Thanh Hóa
- 2020–2023: Topenland Bình Định
- 2024–: Thể Công-Viettel
- * Club domestic league appearances and goals

Nguyễn Đức Thắng (born 28 May 1976) is a Vietnamese football manager and former footballer who is currently the manager of V.League 1 club Thể Công-Viettel.

== Career ==
Born in Hanoi, Đức Thắng spent this entire career playing for the Army's club Thể Công until his retirement in 2005. Throughout his career, he mainly operated as a left-back.

After his retirement from playing, he became a manager, coaching several V.League 1 club such as Sài Gòn, FLC Thanh Hóa, Topenland Bình Định and his former club Thể Công-Viettel (formerly knowns as Thê Công).
