= Patiyo Tambwe =

Congolese former footballer (born 1984)

Tambwe
Personal information
- Full name: Patiyo Tambwe
- Date of birth: 7 January 1984 (age 42)
- Place of birth: Beni, Zaire
- Height: 1.83 m (6 ft 0 in)
- Position: Striker

Senior career*
Years	Team	Apps	(Gls)
2005–2006	Virunga		
2006–2008	Lokeren	62	(15)
2008–2009	Hacettepe	16	(3)
2009–2011	Gençlerbirliği	20	(0)
2011–2012	FC Brussels	31	(6)
2013	Thanh Hóa	9	(3)
2014	Vissai Ninh Bình	7	(5)
2014	An Giang	11	(3)
2015	Quảng Nam	25	(18)
2016	XSKT Cần Thơ	22	(10)
2017–2018	Than Quảng Ninh	19	(10)
2018–2019	XSKT Cần Thơ	23	(10)
2019	Nam Định	13	(4)
2019	Sanna Khánh Hòa BVN	11	(3)

International career^{‡}
2005–2008	DR Congo	5	(0)
- * Club domestic league appearances and goals as of 21 September 2019 ‡ National team caps and goals as of 26 March 2008

Patiyo Tambwe (born 7 January 1984) is a Congolese former footballer who played as a striker. He represented the Congo DR national team in 2005–2008.

In December 2012, he moved to Vietnam and signed a contract with Thanh Hóa. With Quảng Nam, he was the top scorer for the 2015 V.League 1 season, scoring 18 goals.
