= Chu Đình Nghiêm =

Vietnamese football manager

Personal information
- Full name: Chu Đình Nghiêm
- Date of birth: 18 August 1972 (age 54)
- Place of birth: Thanh Hóa, North Vietnam
- Height: 1.73 m (5 ft 8 in)
- Position: Midfielder

Team information
- Current team: Ninh Bình (manager)

Youth career
- 1988–1992: Công An Thanh Hóa

Senior career*
Years	Team	Apps	(Gls)
1992–1994	Công An Thanh Hóa	45	(11)
1994–2001	Nam Định	92	(42)
2001–2003	Hà Nội ACB	32	(9)
2003–2005	Hòa Phát Hà Nội	47	(11)

Managerial career
- 2016–2021: Hà Nội
- 2022–2026: Hải Phòng
- 2026–: Ninh Bình
- * Club domestic league appearances and goals

Chu Đình Nghiêm (born 18 August 1972) is a Vietnamese professional football manager and former player who manages V.League 1 club Ninh Bình.

== Honours ==
=== Manager ===
Hà Nội

- V.League 1: 2016, 2018, 2019
- Vietnamese National Cup: 2019, 2020
- Vietnamese Super Cup: 2018, 2019, 2020

=== Individual ===
- V.League 1 Best Manager: 2016, 2018, 2022
