= Louis Ewonde =

Cameroonian footballer

Personal information
- Full name: Louis Christian Epassi Ewonde
- Date of birth: 19 August 1988 (age 38)
- Place of birth: Garoua, Cameroon
- Height: 1.85 m (6 ft 1 in)
- Position: Centre-back

Senior career*
Years	Team	Apps	(Gls)
2010–2017	Coton Sport		
2018	SHB Da Nang	23	(5)
2019	Ho Chi Minh City	19	(1)
2020–2021	Thanh Hoa FC	24	(1)
- * Club domestic league appearances and goals as of 2 May 2021

Louis Christian Epassi Ewonde is a Cameroon footballer who plays as a centre-back.

== Honours ==
Coton Sport

- Cameroon Premiere Division: 2011, 2013, 2014, 2015
