= Lê Văn Thắng =

Vietnamese footballer (born 1990)

Personal information
- Full name: Lê Văn Thắng
- Date of birth: 8 February 1990 (age 36)
- Place of birth: Nông Cống, Thanh Hóa, Vietnam
- Height: 1.76 m (5 ft 9 in)
- Positions: Forward; attacking midfielder

Team information
- Current team: Thanh Hóa
- Number: 10

Youth career
- 2000–2007: Thanh Hóa

Senior career*
Years	Team	Apps	(Gls)
2007–2013	Thanh Hóa	61	(10)
2013–2014	Vissai Ninh Bình	6	(2)
2014–2015	XSKT Cần Thơ	23	(16)
2015–2017	Hải Phòng	35	(13)
2017–	Thanh Hóa	151	(27)

International career^{‡}
2011–2012	Vietnam U23	2	(0)
2013–2017	Vietnam	9	(1)
- * Club domestic league appearances and goals as of 7 June 2026 ‡ National team caps and goals as of 22 March 2017

Lê Văn Thắng (born 8 February 1990) is a Vietnamese professional footballer who plays as a forward or attacking midfielder for Vietnamese club Thanh Hóa.

== Club career ==
Văn Thắng was an orphan early in his life, at 5 he lost his father, and by the time he was 15, he lost his mother. In the 2007 V-League, he became one of the youngest players to play in the V-League, being 17 years old when he made his debut with Halida Thanh Hoá.

In the 2014, when several Vissai Ninh Bình was arrested for match-fixing at the 2014 AFC Cup, Văn Thắng was suspected to take part but was not convicted due to lack of evidence. He then signed for XSKT Cần Thơ. In the 2015 season, he scored 16 goals and became the best goalscorer among the domestic players.

Văn Thắng signed a 1-year deal with Hải Phòng in November 2015.

In early May 2017 Văn Thắng rejoined boyhood club FLC Thanh Hóa for the rest of the 2017 season.

== International goals ==
Scores and results list Vietnam's goal tally first.

#	Date	Venue	Opponent	Score	Result	Competition
1.	9 October 2016	Maguwoharjo Stadium, Sleman, Indonesia	Indonesia	1– 0	2–2	Friendly match

== Title ==
AFC Cup

- At the AFC Cup 2014, Van Thang came out eight times and scored three goals.

V.League-1

- Silver Medal (1): 2016

Vietnamese Cup

- Gold Medal (1): 2023, 2023–24
- Silver Medal (1): 2018
- Bronze medal (2): 2011, 2022

Vietnamese Super Cup

- Gold Medal (1): 2009, 2023
- Silver Medal (1): 2014
