= Mai Xuân Hợp =

Vietnamese footballer and manager

Personal information
- Full name: Mai Xuân Hợp
- Date of birth: 14 December 1986 (age 39)
- Place of birth: Như Thanh, Thanh Hóa, Vietnam
- Height: 1.82 m (6 ft 0 in)
- Position: Centre back

Youth career
- 2001–2005: Halida Thanh Hóa

Senior career*
Years	Team	Apps	(Gls)
2005–2008	Thanh Hóa	43	(7)
2008–2009	Thể Công	14	(0)
2009–2012	Thanh Hóa	32	(0)
2013–2014	Becamex Bình Dương	11	(0)
2014–2016	Thanh Hóa	24	(0)

International career
2004–2005	Vietnam U19	7	(0)
2005–2007	Vietnam U23	2	(0)
2008–2015	Vietnam	1	(0)

Managerial career
- 2019–2025: Đông Á Thanh Hóa (assistant)
- 2019: Thanh Hóa (caretaker)
- 2020: Thanh Hóa (caretaker)
- 2022–2025: Vietnam U23 (assistant)
- 2022–2024: Vietnam (assistant)
- 2025–2026: Đông Á Thanh Hóa (caretaker)
- 2026–: Thanh Hóa (technical director)
- * Club domestic league appearances and goals

Mai Xuân Hợp (born 14 December 1986 in Thanh Hóa, Vietnam) is a Vietnamese former player and football manager. He is currently the technical director of V.League 1 side Thanh Hóa.

During his playing career, he was a member of Vietnam U-23 squad that played at the 2009 SEA Games. His main positions are center-back and full back.

== Early life ==
Mai Xuân Hợp came from a football family. His father Mai Xuân Thanh was an amateur footballer, His passion for football made him determined for his son to become a quality player. He applied Hợp to football class and brought him proper training equipments.

== Club career ==
=== Halida Thanh Hóa ===
He played for Thanh Hóa youth team in four years from 2001–2005. later on he signed a professional contract with the club and immediately became an important member of the team.

=== Thể Công ===
In November 2008, a month after winning the 2008 Merdeka Cup with U22 Vietnam, Mai Xuân Hợp officially signed a three-year contract with Thể Công for a transfer fee of 3.5 billion Vietnamese đồng, which was selling transfer record of the club at that moment. At that time, even though Hợp never wanted to leave the club but due to financial crisis, Thanh Hóa is forced to sell their best players.

Mai Xuân Hợp made his debut for Thể Công in the first match of 2009 season against Hà Nội T&T F.C., however, he couldn't establish a regular starting position for the rest of the season.

== International career ==
Mai Xuân Hợp made his debut for Vietnam in 2008.
