= Matías Jadue =

Palestinian footballer (born 1992)

Personal information
- Full name: Matías Nicolás Jadue González
- Date of birth: 16 May 1992 (age 34)
- Place of birth: Santiago, Chile
- Height: 1.88 m (6 ft 2 in)
- Position: Striker

Youth career
- 2007–2010: Universidad Católica

Senior career*
Years	Team	Apps	(Gls)
2010–2015	Universidad Católica	13	(2)
2012	→ Deportes La Serena (loan)	14	(2)
2014–2015	→ Deportes Antofagasta (loan)	17	(1)
2015	→ Deportes Santa Cruz (loan)	14	(6)
2016–2017	PKNS	40	(32)
2017	Port	0	(0)
2018	Krabi	9	(2)
2018–2019	Ho Chi Minh City	14	(10)
2020–2021	Rangers	5	(0)
2021–2022	Everton	8	(0)
2022	Suchitepéquez	2	(0)
Total		136	(55)

International career
2007	Chile U15		
2009	Chile U17		
2015–2017	Palestine	7	(1)
- * Club domestic league appearances and goals

Matías Nicolás Jadue González (born 16 May 1992) is a former footballer who played as a striker. Born in Chile, he represented the Palestine national team.

== Club career ==
A product of Universidad Católica, Jadue played for clubs in his country of birth, Malaysia, Thailand, Vietnam and Guatemala. He announced his retirement in August 2022.

== International career ==
He was born and raised in Chile to parents of Palestinian descent. He played for both Chile U15 in the 2007 South American Championship and Chile U17 in the 2009 South American Championship. He then switched over to the Palestine national football team and made his debut for them in a 3–2 loss to Saudi Arabia, where in he scored a goal.

== Personal life ==
His paternal family is originally from Ramallah, Palestine.

== Post-retirement ==
Following his retirement, Jadue assumed as sport manager of Magallanes.

== Career statistics ==
=== International ===
Appearances and goals by national team and year
National team	Year	Apps	Goals
Palestine	2015	6	1
Palestine	2017	1	0
Total		7	1

Scores and results list Palestine's goal tally first, score column indicates score after each Jadue goal.

List of international goals scored by Matías Jadue
No.	Date	Venue	Cap	Opponent	Score	Result	Competition
1	11 June 2015	Prince Mohamed bin Fahd Stadium, Dammam, Saudi Arabia	1	Saudi Arabia	2–2	2–3	2018 FIFA World Cup qualification

== Honours ==
Universidad Católica

- Primera División de Chile: 2010
- Copa Chile: 2011
