= Chaher Zarour =

French footballer (born 1983)

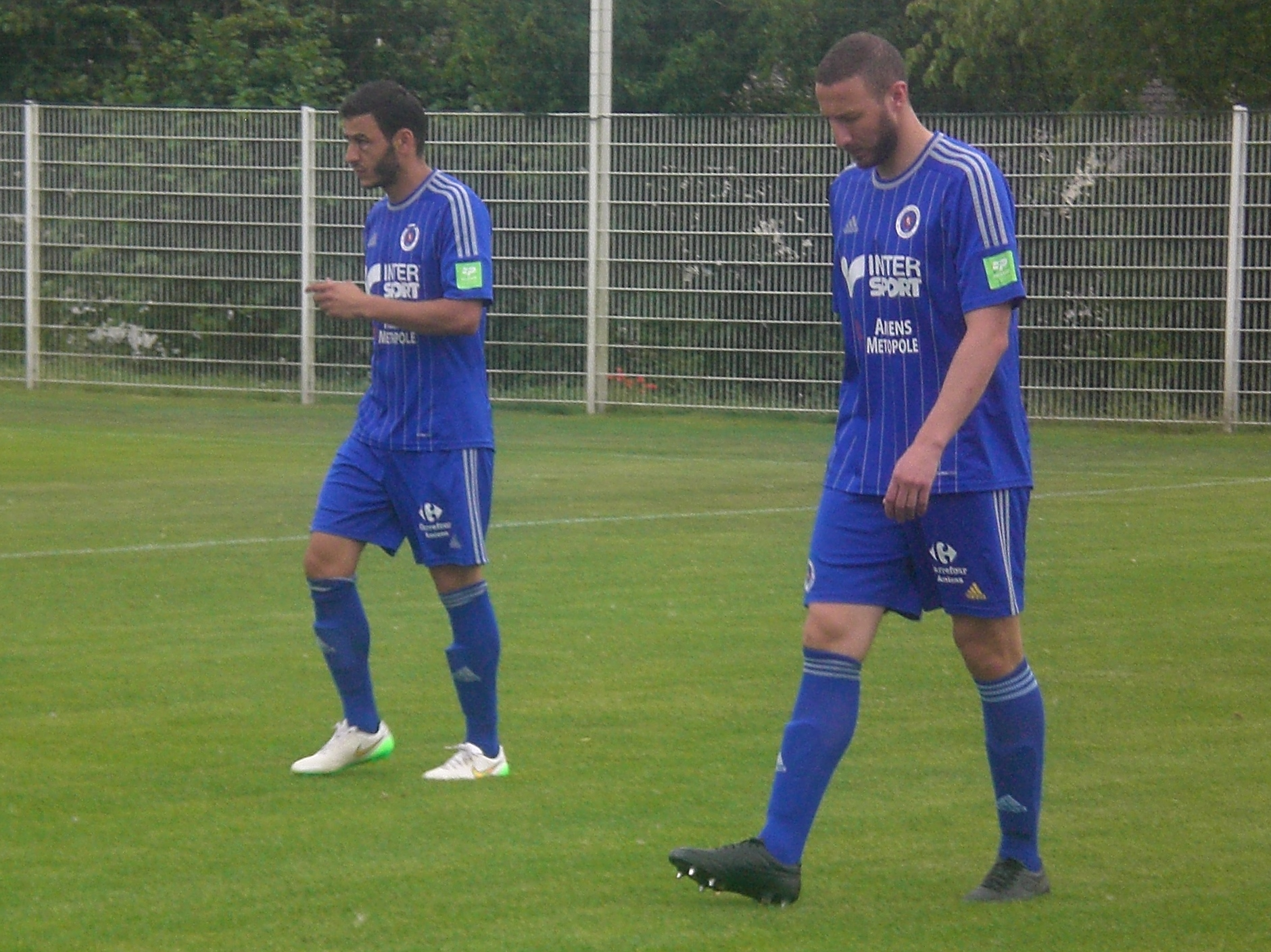
- Abdellah Karbouchi and Chaher Zarour, 2015

Personal information
- Full name: Chaher Zarour
- Date of birth: March 14, 1983 (age 43)
- Place of birth: Montreuil-sous-Bois, France
- Height: 1.90 m (6 ft 3 in)
- Position: Centre-back

Senior career*
Years	Team	Apps	(Gls)
2005–2008	Paris FC	71	(5)
2008–2009	Cannes	36	(1)
2009–2012	Dijon	67	(3)
2012–2013	Arles-Avignon	13	(0)
2014–2015	Aubervilliers	15	(0)
2015	AC Amiens	7	(2)
2016–2019	Sanna Khánh Hòa BVN	96	(11)
2021	Villemomble		
- * Club domestic league appearances and goals as of 15:40, 20 April 2019 (UTC)

Chaher Zarour (born March 14, 1983) is a French footballer who plays as a centre-back.

== Club career ==
=== Dijon ===
On September 16, 2009, Zarour signed a 3-year contract with Ligue 2 side Dijon. Two days later he made his debut for the club coming on as a substitute in a league game against FC Metz. On October 2, 2009, Zarour scored his first goal for the club in a league game against Le Havre AC.

=== Arles-Avignon ===
In July 2012, Zarour joined Ligue 2 side Arles-Avignon on a two-year contract.

=== Sanna Khánh Hòa BVN ===
In January 2016, Zarour joined V-League side Sanna Khánh Hòa BVN on a one-year contract.
