= Chinedu Udoka =

Nigerian footballer

Personal information
- Full name: Chinedu Udoka Onyelonu
- Date of birth: 26 November 1992 (age 33)
- Place of birth: Lagos, Nigeria
- Position: Forward

Team information
- Current team: Becamex Bình Dương
- Number: 21

Senior career*
Years	Team	Apps	(Gls)
2018–	Becamex Bình Dương	5	(2)
- * Club domestic league appearances and goals as of 29 September 2018

Chinedu Udoka Onyelonu (born 26 November 1992) is a Nigerian footballer who plays for Vietnamese club Becamex Bình Dương as a forward.
