= Thanh Hóa Stadium =

Coordinates: 19°47′57″N 105°46′22″E

Sân vận động tỉnh Thanh Hóa
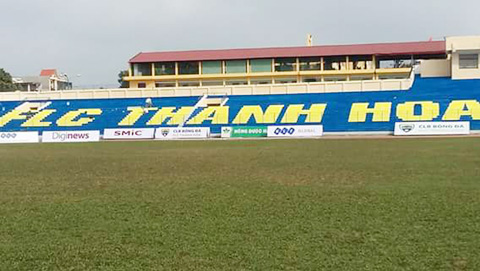
- Interactive map of Sân vận động tỉnh Thanh Hóa
- Location: Thanh Hóa, Vietnam
- Capacity: 14,000

Tenant
- Dong A Thanh Hoa FC

The Thanh Hóa Stadium is a multi-use stadium in Thanh Hóa, Vietnam. It is currently used mostly for football matches and is the home stadium of Dong A Thanh Hoa FC of the V.League 1. The stadium holds 14,000 spectators.
