= Đinh Hoàng Max =

Vietnamese footballer

Maxwell Eyerakpo Đinh Hoàng Max
Personal information
- Birth name: Maxwell Eyerakpo
- Date of birth: 14 December 1986 (age 39)
- Place of birth: Abuja, Nigeria
- Height: 1.89 m (6 ft 2 in)
- Position: Midfielder

Team information
- Current team: Bắc Ninh
- Number: 18

Senior career*
Years	Team	Apps	(Gls)
2006–2007	Đồng Tháp		
2008	T&T Hanoi	21	(16)
2009	Vissai Ninh Bình	23	(4)
2010	Hải Phòng	19	(4)
2011–2012	Vissai Ninh Bình	33	(2)
2012	Đồng Tháp	11	(2)
2013	Xuân Thành Sài Gòn	17	(4)
2014	Hùng Vương An Giang	20	(5)
2015	Than Quảng Ninh	23	(7)
2016	XSKT Cần Thơ	23	(3)
2017–2020	Becamex Bình Dương	75	(4)
2021	Bình Định	2	(0)
2023	Bình Thuận	17	(1)
2024	Vĩnh Long		
2025–	Bắc Ninh		

International career
2009	Vietnam	1	(0)
- * Club domestic league appearances and goals as of 22 July 2023

Đinh Hoàng Max (né: Maxwell Eyerakpo, born 14 December 1986) is a professional footballer who plays as a midfielder for Bắc Ninh. Born in Nigeria, he has represented the Vietnam national team.

== Club career ==
Born in Nigeria, Max had his breakthrough at Đồng Tháp. He then spent most of his career with mixed successes at T&T Hà Nội, Vissai Ninh Bình, Hải Phòng, Xuân Thành Sài Gòn, Hùng Vương An Giang, Than Quảng Ninh, Cần Thơ, Becamex Bình Dương, Bình Định and Bình Thuận, Vĩnh Long and Bắc Ninh.

== International career ==
After acquiring Vietnamese citizenship, he was called up to the Vietnam national football team for the friendly games in 2009, against Greek club Olympiacos on 14 May.
