= Ali Rabo =

Burkinabé international footballer (born 1986)

Personal information
- Date of birth: 6 June 1986 (age 40)
- Place of birth: Bobo-Dioulasso, Burkino Faso
- Height: 1.86 m (6 ft 1 in)
- Positions: Center-back; defensive midfielder

Senior career*
Years	Team	Apps	(Gls)
2007–2011	ASFA Yennenga		
2011–2013	Ittihad El-Shorta	25	(1)
2013–2014	Baghdad FC		
2014–2015	Ittihad El-Shorta	28	(1)
2015–2016	El Mokawloon	23	(0)
2016–2017	Amanat Baghdad		
2017–2018	Masafi		
2018–2021	Becamex Binh Duong	62	(3)

International career^{‡}
2012–2015	Burkina Faso	11	(0)
Medal record
Representing Burkina Faso
Africa Cup of Nations
Runner-up	2013 South Africa
- * Club domestic league appearances and goals as of 08:37, 27 April 2021 (UTC) ‡ National team caps and goals as of 15:10, 21 January 2018 (UTC)

Ali Rabo (born 6 June 1986) is a Burkinabé international footballer who plays as a defensive midfielder.

== Career ==
Born in Bobo-Dioulasso, Rabo has played club football for ASFA Yennenga, Ittihad El-Shorta, Baghdad FC, El Mokawloon, Amanat Baghdad, Masafi and Becamex Bình Dương.

Rabo won 10 caps for Burkina Faso between 2012 and 2015.
