= Warley Oliveira =

Brazilian footballer

Personal information
- Full name: Warley Nascimento de Oliveira
- Date of birth: 26 September 1989 (age 37)
- Place of birth: Brazil
- Position: Forward

Team information
- Current team: Quảng Nam
- Number: 68

Senior career*
Years	Team	Apps	(Gls)
2014	Nova Iguacu	7	(0)
2014	Confianca-SE	8	(5)
2016	Bangu-RJ	6	(4)
2017	Democrata-MG	9	(6)
2017	Democrata GV	2	(1)
2017/2018	Al Sahel Sporting club	25	(15)
2018–	Quảng Nam	7	(5)
- * Club domestic league appearances and goals as of 28 July 2018

Warley Nascimento de Oliveira (born 26 September 1989) is a Brazilian footballer who currently plays as a forward for the Vietnamese V.League 1 side, Quảng Nam.
