= Vũ Thế Vương =

Vietnamese footballer

Personal information
- Full name: Vũ Thế Vương
- Date of birth: 31 January 1994 (age 32)
- Place of birth: Đông Hưng, Thái Bình, Vietnam
- Height: 1.56 m (5 ft 1 in)
- Position: Winger

Team information
- Current team: Thép Cần Thơ
- Number: 30

Youth career
- 2008–2014: Nam Định

Senior career*
Years	Team	Apps	(Gls)
2015–2022	Nam Định	63	(3)
2024–	Thép Cần Thơ	20	(1)
- * Club domestic league appearances and goals as of 7 June 2026

Vũ Thế Vương (born 31 January 1994) is a professional Vietnamese professional footballer who currently plays for V.League 2 club Thép Cần Thơ.

== Career ==
Thế Vương helped Nam Định achieve promotion from the Vietnamese Third Division to the top-flight.

He is one of the shortest players in the Vietnamese top-flight history at 1.56 m tall. and is nicknamed the "Messi of Nam Định" after the Argentine international.

In 2022, Thế Vương announced his retirement at the age of 28. However, he made came out of retirement two years later, signing for the newly established club Quảng Ninh.
