= Joel Vinícius =

Brazilian footballer

Joel Vinicius
Personal information
- Full name: Joel Vinícius Silva dos Anjos
- Date of birth: 25 November 1994 (age 31)
- Place of birth: São Paulo, Brazil
- Height: 1.87 m (6 ft 2 in)
- Position: Forward

Senior career*
| Years | Team | Apps | (Gls) |
| 2015 | Grêmio Osasco | 13 | (1) |
| 2015–2016 | MFK Frýdek-Místek | 6 | (0) |
| 2018–2019 | Than Quảng Ninh | 21 | (9) |
| 2019 | Hồ Chí Minh City | 12 | (6) |
| 2019 | Sông Lam Nghệ An | 11 | (5) |
| 2020 | São Caetano | 8 | (1) |
| 2021 | Juventus | 9 | (1) |
| 2021–2022 | UiTM | 8 | (2) |
| 2022 | Al-Hala | 12 | (3) |
| 2022–2023 | Juventus | 21 | (8) |
| 2023 | Bahrain | 7 | (0) |
| 2023 | Inter de Limeira | 0 | (0) |
| 2023–2024 | Al-Riffa | 19 | (7) |
| 2024 | Caxias | 13 | (2) |
| 2024 | → Inter de Limeira (loan) | 3 | (0) |
| 2024 | Sitra Club | 14 | (4) |
| 2025 | Bahrain SC | 18 | (7) |
| 2025–2026 | Borneo Samarinda | 18 | (7) |
| 2026 | Arema | 15 | (8) |
- * Club domestic league appearances and goals as of 22 May 2026

Joel Vinícius Silva dos Anjos (born 25 November 1994) is a Brazilian professional footballer who plays as a forward.
