= Vũ Quang Bảo =

Vietnamese footballer (born 1955)

Vũ Quang Bảo (1955 – 8 February 2024) was a Vietnamese football manager and former footballer.

== Career ==
He has been described as "no stranger to the role of "welder" for mid-range football teams that need a rescue at critical times. Navibank Saigon, Can Tho, Lam Dong, Quang Nam or Thanh Hoa have come to him as a support plan in times of difficulty. But it needs to be added that Mr. Vu Quang Bao often does not stick with the above teams for long".

== Style of play ==
He mainly operated as a striker and was left-footed.

== Personal life ==
Quang Bảo died on 8 February 2024 at his home in Nghệ An following a stroke.
