= Can Tho FC =

Vietnamese football club

Cần Thơ
- Nicknames: Tây Đô (The Western Capital); The Green Boys
- Short name: CFC
- Founded: 1976; 50 years ago
- Ground: Cần Thơ Stadium
- Capacity: 30,000
- Chairman: Nguyễn Thanh Long
- Manager: Hoàng Hải Dương
- League: Vietnamese Third Division
- =2026: Vietnamese Second Division, 7th of 7 (Group B, relegated)
Home colours	Away colours

Cần Thơ Football Club (Vietnamese: Câu lạc bộ bóng đá Cần Thơ), commonly known as Cần Thơ, was a Vietnamese football club based in Cần Thơ. The team's nickname was "Tây Đô" (The Western Capital) and they played their home matches at Cần Thơ Stadium. The club currently does not compete in any competitions in the Vietnamese football league system.

== History ==
On 16 August 2014, XSKT Cần Thơ defeated Hùng Vương An Giang 3–0 in the play-off match in Bình Dương and won promotion to V.League 1 for the 2015 season.

At the start of the 2016 season, the team continued to invest heavily, signing the top scorer of the 2015 V.League 1 Patiyo Tambwe, along with other quality players.

In late February 2022, Tây Đô Group officially took over the operation and management of the team from the 2022 season. Towards the end of the 2022 season, Cần Thơ players considered striking and withdrawing from the league due to long-overdue salaries and bonuses. However, the Cần Thơ City People's Committee took over the team and supported them to finish the season. The team finished the season in 8th/12 place.

The Cần Thơ City People's Committee tried to find new sponsors but was unsuccessful. There were rumors that Cần Thơ FC would be transferred to Lâm Đồng to continue playing in the V.League 2, but this did not materialize due to the tight schedule. On 18 February 2023, a representative of the Vietnam Professional Football (VPF) company confirmed that Cần Thơ would not participate in the 2023 V.League 2. VPF had previously extended the registration deadline twice for Cần Thơ to help the club find a solution to continue playing.

After withdrawing from the V.League 2, the team registered for the 2024 Vietnamese Third Division with a core of young players. The team finished the season in last place in Group B and did not register for the 2025 season.

== Crests and colours ==
=== Crests ===
Crest of Cần Thơ (2018–2022)

Crest of Cần Thơ (2023–present)

=== Club identity ===
The traditional and main colour of Cần Thơ Football Club is green, which appears on their official home kit and club logos throughout many periods. Because of this shirt color, the team is also nicknamed "The Green Boys".

The most popular and official nickname for the team is "Đội bóng Tây Đô" (The Tây Đô Team). This name originates from the historical moniker of Cần Thơ city, which is nicknamed "Tây Đô" (meaning "The Western Capital").

== Kit suppliers and sponsors ==
Period	Kit manufacturer	Shirt sponsor (front)	Shirt sponsor (back)
1993–2008	None	None	None
2009–2015	None	Cần Thơ Lottery	None
2016–2017	(Vietnam) KeepDri	Cần Thơ Lottery	Global
2018–2019	(Vietnam) KeepDri	Cần Thơ Lottery	None
2020	(Vietnam) KeepDri	Cần Thơ Lottery	None
2021	(Vietnam) Masu	None	
2022–2023	(Thailand) Grand Sport	Bamboo Airways	Cần Thơ Lottery

== Players ==
=== Current squad ===
As of March 2026

Note: Flags indicate national team as defined under FIFA eligibility rules; some limited exceptions apply. Players may hold more than one non-FIFA nationality.

No.	Pos.	Nation	Player
1	GK	VIE	Trần Phúc Quyết
4		VIE	Danh Trung Hiếu
7		VIE	Trần Hoàng Nam
9		VIE	Trần Công Nin
10		VIE	Võ Tuấn Tài
17		VIE	Nguyễn Văn Chánh Quyên
19		VIE	Hà Đức Nguyên
20		VIE	Hoàng Ngọc Tuấn Anh
22	GK	VIE	Trần Nguyễn Gia Bảo
23		VIE	Trần Văn Hiếu
24		VIE	Đào Văn Lượng

No.	Pos.	Nation	Player
25	GK	VIE	Ksor Nay Đê Sô
26		VIE	Bùi Xuân Bình
29		USA	Kenny Phi Hoang Chandler
30		VIE	Phan Minh Trung
47		VIE	Tạ Quốc Thuận
61		VIE	Huỳnh Phương Nam
72		VIE	Nguyễn Văn Trọng
77		VIE	Phan Sỹ Khang
81		VIE	Thiệu Quang Tín
86		VIE	Nguyễn Văn Kỳ

=== Notable players ===
- (Vietnam) Lương Văn Phước (1976–19??)
- (Vietnam) Trình Hận Quốc Bảo (1987–1997)
- (Vietnam) Trương Dương Minh Mẫn (1999–2001)
- (Vietnam) Trương Hữu Nhã (1989–1997)
- (Ivory Coast) Mohamed Koné (2005)
- (Vietnam) Phan Kim Long (2003–2008)
- (Argentina) Diego Molares (2007)
- (Brazil) Paulo Henrique Baborsa (2007–2008)
- (Brazil) William Dos Santos (2009)
- (Brazil) Da Silva (2008–2009)
- (Mali) Souleymane Diabate (2012)
- (Vietnam) Nguyễn Huy Hoàng (2013, 2014)
- (Vietnam) Lê Văn Trương (2014)
- (Vietnam) Nguyễn Thế Anh (2013, 2014, 2015)
- (Vietnam) Lê Văn Thắng (2015)
- (Nigeria) Ganiyu Oseni (2015, 2016)
- (Vietnam) Đinh Tiến Thành (2015, 2016)
- (Democratic Republic of the Congo) Patiyo Tambwe
- (Vietnam) Lê Thế Cường
- (Vietnam) Đinh Hoàng Max (2016)
- (Vietnam) Dương Văn An (2022)

== Coaching staff ==
Position	Name
Chairman	Nguyễn Thanh Long
Director	(Vacant)
Manager	Hoàng Hải Dương
Assistant Manager	(Vacant)
Analyst	(Vacant)
Goalkeeping Coach	Nguyễn Thanh Tú
Doctor	Dương Kim Hùng
Doctor	Hồ Văn Hòa

== Managerial history ==
- (Vietnam) Nguyễn Văn Tốt (1993–1996)
- (Vietnam) Nguyễn Vân (1999)
- (Vietnam) Vương Tiến Dũng (2001–2002)
- (Vietnam) Lưu Mộng Hùng (2002)
- (Scotland) Terry Wetton (2003–2004)
- (Vietnam) Trương Hữu Nhã (2004)
- (Vietnam) Nguyễn Thành Kiểm (2004–2007)
- (Vietnam) Trương Hữu Nhã (2007–2008)
- (Vietnam) Nguyễn Văn Nhã (2008–2009)
- (Vietnam) Võ Văn Hùng (2009)
- (Vietnam) Lư Đình Tuấn (2009–2010)
- (Vietnam) Trương Hữu Nhã (2010)
- (Vietnam) Vũ Quang Bảo (2010–2011)
- (Vietnam) Huỳnh Ngọc San (03/2011–04/2013)
- (Vietnam) Vương Tiến Dũng (04/2013–06/2014)
- (Vietnam) Nguyễn Thanh Danh (06/2014–08/2014)
- (Vietnam) Nguyễn Văn Sỹ (09/2014–03/03/2015)
- (Vietnam) Nguyễn Thanh Danh (04/03/2015–10/12/2015)
- (Vietnam) Vũ Quang Bảo (10/12/2015–08/12/2017)
- (Vietnam) Đinh Hồng Vinh (08/12/2017–2018)
- (Vietnam) Nguyễn Thanh Danh (2019–05/2019)
- (Vietnam) Vũ Quang Bảo (05/2019–09/2019)
- (Vietnam) Nguyễn Hữu Đang (10/2019-7/2020)
- (Vietnam) Nguyễn Liêm Thanh (7/2020-9/2020)
- (Vietnam) Nguyễn Hữu Đang (2020-2021)
- (Vietnam) Nguyễn Việt Thắng (03/2022–9/2022)
- (Vietnam) Nguyễn Thanh Tú (9/2022–10/2022)
- (Vietnam) Hoàng Hải Dương (10/2022–2024)

== Honours ==
- V.League 2
  - (bronze) Third place (1): 2014
- Vietnamese Second Division
  - (bronze) Third place (1): 2006

== Season-by-season records ==
=== V.League 1 ===
Season	Position	Pl	W	D	L	GF	GA	Pts
2015	11th	26	6	7	13	32	52	25
2016	11th	26	10	4	12	37	36	34
2017	13th	26	5	14	7	32	50	22
2018	14th	26	4	9	13	26	43	21

=== V.League 2 ===
Season	Position	Pl	W	D	L	GF	GA	Pts
2004	10th	22	5	7	10			22
2005	4th	22	11	5	6	23	21	38
2007	6th	26	10	7	9	27	24	37
2008	4th	26	13	7	6	40	23	46
2009	3rd	24	9	10	5	32	26	37
2010	6th	24	8	9	7	27	28	33
2011	6th	26	11	3	12	33	42	36
2012	5th	26	10	9	7	37	30	39
2013	5th	14	6	3	5	31	22	21
2014	3rd	14	6	3	5	21	23	21
2019	10th	22	4	10	8	17	33	22
2020	10th	11	2	3	6	16	22	9
2021	8th	6	2	1	3	5	10	7
2022	8th	22	7	6	9	28	30	27
2023	Withdrew							

=== Vietnamese Third Division ===
Season	Position	Pl	W	D	L	GF	GA	Pts
2024	8th (Group B)	7	1	0	6	5	18	3
