= Thanh Hoa FC =

Association football club in Vietnam

Thanh Hóa FC
- Full name: Thanh Hoá Football Club (Câu lạc bộ Bóng đá Thanh Hoá)
- Nickname: Chiến binh Lam Sơn (Lam Sơn Warriors)
- Short name: THFC
- Founded: 1962; 64 years ago as Thanh Hoa Youth Football Team
- Ground: Thanh Hóa Stadium
- Capacity: 14,000
- Owner: Thanh Hoá Football Development J.S.C.
- Chairman: Lê Xuân Tưởng
- Head coach: Kim Young-chul
- League: V.League 1
- 2025–26: V.League 1, 11th of 14
- Website: https://www.facebook.com/dongathanhhoafootballclub
Home colours	Away colours

Thanh Hóa Football Club (Vietnamese: Câu lạc bộ bóng đá Thanh Hoá) is a Vietnamese professional football club based in Thanh Hóa. They are now playing in V.League 1, the top tier of the Vietnamese football league.

== History ==
=== Formation and early years (1962–1965) ===
Following the growth of football in Thanh Hóa during the 1950s, local authorities sought to establish a provincial team that would serve as the foundation for the development of the sport in the region.

In 1962, the Thanh Hóa Provincial Sports Committee, the predecessor of the provincial Department of Culture, Sports and Tourism, established the Thanh Hóa Youth Football Club. The team consisted of talented players selected from local football competitions and was intended to represent the province in organised football.

Later that year, the provincial authorities transferred the youth team to the Thanh Hóa Mechanical Factory, allowing its players to pursue employment alongside their football careers. The team was consequently renamed the Thanh Hóa Mechanical Football Club. In 1965, the team was dissolved and its players were integrated into the Thanh Hóa Police Football Club, marking the end of this early period in the club's history.

=== Re-establishment and professional development (2000–2010) ===
Following the dissolution of the Công An Thanh Hóa Football Club in 1994, youth football continued to operate under the provincial sports authorities. One of its notable achievements was the Thanh Hóa U19 team's national championship in 1997. To revive the province's senior football programme, the local authorities subsequently re-established Thanh Hóa Football Club in 2000. The team entered the 2000–01 Vietnamese Second Division, beginning a new period in the development of football in the province.

On 11 May 2005, Thanh Hóa signed a sponsorship agreement worth VND 1.5 billion with the IBD joint venture company and adopted the name Halida Thanh Hóa Football Club. In 2008, during the second phase of the 2008 V.League 1 season, the club was transferred to Cong Thanh Group and renamed Cong Thanh Thanh Hóa Cement Football Club.

On 25 June 2009, Cong Thanh Cement ended its sponsorship before the conclusion of the season. The club was subsequently transferred to the Thanh Hóa Provincial People's Committee and returned to the name Thanh Hóa Football Club, formalised by a provincial decision dated 29 September 2009.

During the same year, the Ministry of National Defence revoked the title of Thể Công and transferred the team to Viettel Group, which renamed it Viettel. Following the group's decision not to continue operating the team in professional football at that time, an agreement was reached to transfer its V.League playing slot and first-team players to Thanh Hóa province. A new team, Viettel–Thanh Hóa Football Club, was established on 7 November 2009 and renamed Lam Sơn Thanh Hóa Football Club on 24 December 2009.

On 18 January 2010, Vương Văn Việt, Vice Chairman of Thanh Hóa Provincial People's Committee - signed a decision to disband Thanh Hoa Football Club and merge it into Lam Son Thanh Hóa. The team started official competition with the match against SHB Đà Nẵng for the 2009 National Super Cup on 23 January 2010 and played in the professional football tournament 2010 V-League season with the match slot transferred from the V-League. The Cong doesn't have to start from the third division.

=== Reorganisation and FLC ownership (2011–2018) ===
At the end of the 2010 season, Lam Sơn Thanh Hóa was officially transferred to Lam Son Thanh Hóa Football Joint Stock Company (predecessor of Thanh Hoa Football JSC). In the following season, the company's Board of Directors decided to reuse the old name of the previously disbanded team, Thanh Hóa Football Club. After a while, due to many financial difficulties, Mr. Nguyen Van De, Chairman of Thanh Hóa Football Club, repeatedly applied to transfer the team back to the Department of Culture, Sports and Tourism. Thanh Hóa province. Faced with that situation, the provincial leaders called on FLC Group, an enterprise investing in many large-scale projects in Thanh Hóa, to receive and invest in the football team.

On 5 June 2015, FLC Group officially received Thanh Hóa Football Club from Thanh Hóa Football Joint Stock Company. Accordingly, all personnel including officers, employees, workers, coaches, first team players, youth teams under the club, coaching boards of football teams as well as all assets, Facilities under the Club's management such as the Youth Football Training Center, stadium,... have been handed over to FLC Group in their original state. On September 7, 2015, FLC Thanh Hóa Football Joint Stock Company was established, with a charter capital of 50 billion VND with 3 founding shareholders: FLC Group (owning 80% of charter capital), Đoàn Văn Phương (Chairman of the Board of Directors and CEO - 10%) and Lê Thành Vinh (10%).In 2016, according to information from the Ho Chi Minh City Stock Exchange (HOSE), the Board of Directors of FLC Group Joint Stock Company approved a decision to divest capital at FLC Thanh Hoa Football Joint Stock Company.

After 3 years of association, in November 2018, president Trịnh Văn Quyết of FLC Group announced to quit Thanh Hóa football and return FLC Thanh Hóa to the locality.

==== AFC Cup debut (2018) ====
In 2018, FLC Thanh Hóa made their debut in the AFC Cup, qualifying for the continental competition after finishing as runners-up in the 2017 V.League 1 season. Drawn in Group G of the ASEAN Zone, they faced Philippines club Global, Myanmar club Yangon United and Indonesian club Bali United. The club began their campaign with a 1–0 victory over Global at the Mỹ Đình National Stadium. However, they subsequently suffered a 2–1 defeat to Yangon United despite taking an early lead, before losing 3–1 away to Bali United after conceding three goals in eight minutes. Thanh Hóa then drew 0–0 with Bali United in their return fixture, keeping their hopes of progressing alive. However, their campaign faltered further after a 3–3 draw against Global, having surrendered a two-goal advantage in the match. Ahead of their final group-stage fixture, Thanh Hóa had already been eliminated from the competition. They finished their campaign with a 3–3 draw against Yangon United on 25 April 2018. FLC Thanh Hóa finished third in Group G with six points from six matches, failing to advance to the ASEAN Zone knockout stage.

=== Rebuilding period (2019–2022) ===
Following FLC Group's withdrawal, Thanh Hóa experienced a period of rebuilding as the club sought to regain its competitiveness in the V.League 1. In 2019, the club finished 13th in the league, narrowly avoiding relegation. The following season, Thanh Hóa placed 11th in the shortened 2020 campaign, which was disrupted by the COVID-19 pandemic. In August 2020, the club briefly announced its intention to withdraw from the remaining fixtures because of the uncertainty surrounding the competition's resumption, but subsequently continued participating.

The 2021 V.League 1 season was abandoned due to the pandemic, with Thanh Hóa having played 12 matches before the competition was halted. The club returned to a full league campaign in 2022, finishing eighth with 28 points from 24 matches. Although Thanh Hóa did not challenge for the league title during this period, the club remained in the top division while undergoing changes in management and working to establish greater stability following FLC Group's departure.

=== Domestic cup success and continental competition (2023–present) ===
On 1 December 2022, Thanh Hóa appointed Bulgarian Velizar Popov as head coach. Under his leadership, the club experienced a significant improvement in its performances, finishing fourth in the 2023 V.League 1 season. On 20 August 2023, Thanh Hóa defeated Viettel in the final, winning 5–3 on penalties after the match ended goalless. The victory marked the club's first major national cup triumph and was followed by success in the 2023 Vietnamese Cup, in which Thanh Hóa defeated league champions Hà Nội to secure the trophy. Thanh Hóa continued their success in the 2023–24 Vietnamese Cup, reaching the final against Hà Nội on 7 July 2024. After a goalless draw, Thanh Hóa won 9–8 in the penalty shoot-out to successfully defend their title, becoming consecutive winners of the competition. The victory also secured qualification for the 2024–25 AFC Champions League Two. Following the cup triumph, Popov signed a contract extension to remain as head coach for the 2024–25 and 2025–26 seasons. His tenure had brought the club two consecutive Vietnamese Cup titles and the Vietnamese Super Cup in 2023.

In 2024, Thanh Hóa then participate in the recently revived tournament, the 2024–25 ASEAN Club Championship being placed alongside Indonesian club PSM Makassar, Thai club BG Pathum United, Malaysian club Terengganu, Cambodian club Preah Khan Reach Svay Rieng and Burmese club Shan United. The club hosted the tournament's opening match at Thanh Hóa Stadium on 21 August 2024, defeating Shan United 3–1. However, despite beginning the campaign with a victory, Thanh Hóa struggled to maintain consistency throughout the group stage. They drew against Terengganu, BG Pathum United and Preah Khan Reach Svay Rieng before suffering a 3–0 defeat to PSM Makassar. The results left Thanh Hóa fifth in the group with five points, ending their hopes of reaching the knockout stage.

In March 2025, Velizar Popov departed the club while Thanh Hóa were third in the V.League 1 standings. His departure marked the end of a successful period during which the club won three major trophies and established itself as a competitive force in Vietnamese domestic football. In the 2024–25 Vietnamese Cup, Thanh Hóa were eliminated by Hải Phòng in the round of 16, ending their attempt to win the competition for a third consecutive season.

== Team image ==
=== Crest and colours ===
Old club crest

=== Former team names ===
- 1962: Thanh Hóa Youth
- 1962–1965: Thanh Hóa Mechanical
- 1965: Công An Thanh Hóa
- 2000–2005: Thanh Hóa
- 2005–2008: Halida Thanh Hóa
- 2008–2009: Xi Măng Công Thành Thanh Hóa
- 2009: Thanh Hóa
- 2009–2010: Lam Sơn Thanh Hóa
- 2011–2015: Thanh Hóa
- 2015–2020: FLC Thanh Hóa
- 2020–2026: Đông Á Thanh Hóa
- 2026–present: Thanh Hóa

== Achievement ==
- In period 1962–1980: Team usually played in the resolution and explains the movement of Ministry of Public Security of Vietnam.
- From 1980 to 1985: Playing in the Championship at A2 level, in Vietnam. And the A2 Grade Championship in 1985 team had jump upon A1 level to gain promotion.
- In 1986 played in the A1 championship, Vietnam. In step 1, Team was competitive in table A. 2 won, 3 drawn,7 lost, effect-goal defeat was 8–18, gaining seven points, ranked 7 / 7 on Table A.
- In 1987 still play in the A1 level. Period 1, competition on table B. Result: 4 won, 5 drawn, 7 lost, effect-goal defeats were 19–25, reaching 12 points. Ranked No. 6 / 9 Table B.
- In 1988, has no organized tournament.
- In 1989, a period of play in table C. Result: won 4, drawn 4, lost 4, signal-loss goal is 12–13, ranked 7 / 11, reached the second stage competition. Phase 2 in Group 1 competition. Results: in March, losing 3 and rank 3 / 7.
- In 1990 rated 5 / 6 Group A, not a series of stages through
- In 1991, competing in Group C Stage 1, achievement: won 1, drawn 2, lost 7, effect-goal defeat was 5–14, rated 6 / 6.

1992, A1 relegation.

- From 1993 to 1994 season, reaching a point all season. A2 relegation.
- From 1995 to 2000, competed in the A2. U19 championship in 1997 Vietnam.
- Class of 2000 by the Vietnam Football Federation, the Thanh Hóa Youth Championship tournament in 3 (the lowest rating system has four). In 2000, Thanh Hóa Youth Group A and took most rank 2.
- In 2001, champion 2 and gain a promotion.
- In 2002, ranking 5 / 12 Division in Vietnam.
- In 2003, ranked 3 / 12 first-class championship in Vietnam.
- In 2004, competed in Vietnam with a first class achievement: won 6, drawn 8, lost 8, at 26 points, ranking 6 / 12.
- In 2005, the Championship tournament in Vietnam with achievement: won 7, drawn 6, lost 9, at 21 points, ranking 7 / 12.
- In 2006, playing in the Championship class in Vietnam. Result: won 12, drawn 12, lost 2, signal-loss goal is 43–19, ranked 2 / 14. Professional gain promotion.
- In 2007, competed in the national championship V-League. Results: Phase 1 formula ranked No. 2. Full finished the season ranked 9 / 14, won 8 games, drawn 10 matches, losing eight games. Scored 34 points to reach 27 goals, conceding 30 goals (including three goals by the organizers were lost in treatment for 6), fined 46 yellow cards, two red cards.
- In 2008, competed in V-League 2008. Total number of matches won 26 games in which eight games, losing 9 games, drawn 9 matches. Total number of goals scored is 25 goals, conceding 32 goals. 32 total points, final 10/14 ranking.
- In 2009 competed in V-League 2009. 14/14 final ranking, was to play in the Championship in 2010.
- Date 18/01/2010 permanently disbanded because of lack of funding for that.

== Kit suppliers and shirt sponsors ==
Period	Kit manufacturer	Shirt sponsor
2016-2019	(England) Mitre	FLC
2019–2025	(Japan) Jogarbola	Dong A Group; Bamboo Airways Casper Electric
2025–	(Vietnam) Wika	Dong A Group

== Players ==
=== Current squad ===
As of 5 September 2026

Note: Flags indicate national team as defined under FIFA eligibility rules; some limited exceptions apply. Players may hold more than one non-FIFA nationality.

No.	Pos.	Nation	Player
2	MF	VIE	Nguyễn Hữu Dũng
5	DF	VIE	Lục Xuân Hưng
7	MF	VIE	Nguyễn Bá Tiến
8	MF	VIE	Ngô Đức Hoàng
9	FW	MLI	Saliou Guindo
10	FW	VIE	Lê Văn Thắng
11	MF	VIE	Nguyễn Ngọc Tĩnh
12	DF	VIE	Nguyễn Văn Dũng
14	DF	VIE	Trương Thanh Nam
15	DF	VIE	Trịnh Văn Lợi
16	DF	VIE	Nguyễn Đình Huyên
17	FW	VIE	Nguyễn Văn Tùng
19	MF	VIE	Lê Bá Nam
20	DF	VIE	Lại Văn Tú
21	MF	VIE	Trần Ngọc Quý
22	MF	LAO	Damoth Thongkhamsavath

No.	Pos.	Nation	Player
23	GK	VIE	Vũ Tuyên Quang
25	GK	VIE	Nguyễn Thanh Diệp
26	MF	VIE	Hà Minh Đức
28	MF	VIE	Hà Văn Kiệt
29	DF	VIE	Đoàn Ngọc Hà
30	GK	VIE	Hồ Tùng Hân (on loan from SHB Đà Nẵng)
32	DF	VIE	Nguyễn Trọng Đại Nghĩa
35	MF	CRO	Di Mateo Lovrić
39	MF	VIE	Đoàn Tuấn Cảnh
58	DF	VIE	Trương Đức Mạnh
75	FW	VIE	Lê Văn Hoàn
77	MF	KGZ	Odilzhon Abdurakhmanov
89	MF	VIE	Nguyễn Trọng Phú
90	DF	VIE	Nguyễn Đức Tùng
93	GK	VIE	Lê Anh Tuấn
98	FW	BRA	Matheus Martins

== Management staff ==
Position	Name
Technical director	(Vietnam) Mai Xuân Hợp
Head coach	(South Korea) Kim Young-chul
Assistant coach	(Vietnam) Lê Hồng Minh
Assistant coach	(Vietnam) Nguyễn Thành Dũng
Goalkeeper coach	(Vietnam) Trương Mạnh Hà
Technical analyst	(Vietnam) Hoàng Thanh Tùng
Team doctor	(Vietnam) Dương Tiến Kỷ
Team doctor	(Vietnam) Vũ Hồng Quang

== Managerial history ==
Name	Period	Achievements
(Vietnam) Lê Thụy Hải	2001–2003	
(Vietnam) Vương Tiến Dũng	2003–2004	
(Vietnam) Trần Văn Phúc	2005–2008	
(Vietnam) Nguyễn Văn Tiến	2009	
(Vietnam) Triệu Quang Hà	2009	
(Vietnam) Nguyễn Văn Tiến (2)	2009–2010	2009 Vietnamese Super Cup
(Vietnam) Lê Thụy Hải (2)	2010–2011	
(Vietnam) Triệu Quang Hà (2)	2011–2013	
(Vietnam) Mai Đức Chung	2013–2014	
(Vietnam) Hoàng Thanh Tùng	2014	
(Vietnam) Vũ Quang Bảo	2014–2015	
(Vietnam) Hoàng Thanh Tùng (2)	2015–2016	
(Serbia) Ljupko Petrović	2016–2017	
(Romania) Marian Mihail	2017–2018	
(Vietnam) Nguyễn Đức Thắng	2018–2019	
(Vietnam) Vũ Quang Bảo (2)	2019	
(Vietnam) Mai Xuân Hợp	2019	
(Italy) Fabio Lopez	2019–2020	
(Vietnam) Nguyễn Thành Công	2020	
(Vietnam) Mai Xuân Hợp	2020	
(Serbia) Ljupko Petrović (2)	2020–2022	
(Serbia) Svetislav Tanasijević	2022	
(Bulgaria) Velizar Popov	2022–2025	2023 Vietnamese Cup; 2023 Vietnamese Super Cup; 2023–24 Vietnamese Cup
(Croatia) Tomislav Steinbrückner	2025	
(South Korea) Choi Won-kwon	2025	
(Vietnam) Mai Xuân Hợp (2)	2025–2026	
(Vietnam) Nguyễn Anh Đức	2026	
(South Korea) Kim Young-chul	2026–present	

== Honours ==
=== National competitions ===
League

- V.League 1
  - Runners-up: 2017, 2018
  - Third place: 2014, 2015
- V.League 2
  - Runners-up: 2003
  - Third place: 2006
- Vietnamese Second Division
  - Winners: 2001

Cup

- Vietnamese National Cup:
  - Winners: 2023, 2023–24
  - Runners-up: 2018
  - Third place: 2022
- Vietnamese Super Cup
  - Winners: 2009, 2023
  - Runners-up: 2024

== Records ==
=== Regional record ===
Season	Competition	Round	Club	Home	Away	Aggregate
2024–25	ASEAN Club Championship	Group A	(Myanmar) Shan United	3–1		5th out of 6
2024–25	ASEAN Club Championship	Group A	(Malaysia) Terengganu		2–2	5th out of 6
2024–25	ASEAN Club Championship	Group A	(Thailand) BG Pathum United		1–1	5th out of 6
2024–25	ASEAN Club Championship	Group A	(Cambodia) Preah Khan Reach Svay Rieng	0–0		5th out of 6
2024–25	ASEAN Club Championship	Group A	(Indonesia) PSM Makassar		0–3	5th out of 6

=== Continental record ===
Season	Competition	Round	Club	Home	Away	Aggregate
2018	AFC Champions League	Preliminary round 2	(Hong Kong) Eastern	4–2		
2018	AFC Champions League	Play-off round	(South Korea) Suwon Samsung Bluewings	1–5		
2018	AFC Cup	Group G	(Philippines) Global	1–0	3–3	3rd out of 4
2018	AFC Cup	Group G	(Myanmar) Yangon United	3–3	1–2	3rd out of 4
2018	AFC Cup	Group G	(Indonesia) Bali United	0–0	1–3	3rd out of 4
