= 2017 Mekong Club Championship final =

Toyota Mekong Club Championship
- Event: 2017 Mekong Club Championship
Sanna Khánh Hòa BVN	SCG Muangthong United
(Vietnam)	(Thailand)
1	7
- on aggregate

First leg
Sanna Khánh Hòa BVN	SCG Muangthong United
1	3
- Date: 23 December 2017
- Venue: Hàng Đẫy Stadium, Hanoi
- Man of the Match: Adisak Kraisorn
- Referee: Nagor Amir Noor Mohamed (Malaysia)
- Attendance: 22,500
- Weather: Passing clouds 17 °C (63 °F) humidity 73%

Second leg
SCG Muangthong United	Sanna Khánh Hòa BVN
4	0
- Date: 6 January 2018
- Venue: Supachalasai Stadium, Bangkok
- Man of the Match: Teerasil Dangda
- Referee: Sukhbir Singh (Singapore)
- Attendance: 15,000
- Weather: Partly cloudly 29 °C (84 °F) humidity 65%

The 2017 Mekong Club Championship final was the final match of the 2017 Mekong Club Championship, the 4th season of a football tournament in the Greater Mekong Subregion organised by Toyota.

The final was contested in two-legged home-and-away format between Vietnam team Sanna Khánh Hòa BVN the 6th place of the 2017 V.League 1 and Thailand team SCG Muangthong United the winners of the 2017 Thai League Cup. The first leg was hosted by Sanna Khánh Hòa BVN at the Hàng Đẫy Stadium in Hanoi on 23 December 2017, while the second leg was hosted by SCG Muangthong United at the Supachalasai Stadium in Bangkok on 6 January 2018. SCG Muangthong United won the final 7–1 at overall and clinched their first title.

== Road to the final ==
In the semi-finals round, Sanna Khánh Hòa BVN beat Laos team Lao Toyota 2–0, while a football club from Thailand has qualified to the final automatically because the defending champions was a football club from Thailand.

(Vietnam) Sanna Khánh Hòa BVN				Round	(Thailand) SCG Muangthong United
Opponent	Result			Knockout	Qualified to the final automatically
Opponent	Agg.	1st leg	2nd leg	Knockout	Qualified to the final automatically
(Cambodia) Boeung Ket	9–5	4–4 (H)	5–1 (A)	Quarter-finals	Qualified to the final automatically
(Laos) Lao Toyota	2–0 (A)			Semi-finals	Qualified to the final automatically

== Match ==
=== Summary ===
Team 1	Agg.	Team 2	1st leg	2nd leg
Sanna Khánh Hòa BVN (Vietnam)	1–7	(Thailand) SCG Muangthong United	1–3	0–4

=== First leg ===
23 December 2017
18:00 UTC+7

Sanna Khánh Hòa BVN (Vietnam)	1–3	(Thailand) SCG Muangthong United
Touré 42'	Report; Highlight	Adisak 6', 90+3'; Sarach 87'

Hàng Đẫy Stadium, Hanoi
Attendance: 22,500
Referee: Nagor Amir Noor Mohamed (Malaysia)

Sanna Khánh Hòa BVN	SCG Muangthong United

Lineups:
GK	26	(Vietnam) Nguyễn Tuấn Mạnh
DF	9	(Vietnam) Trần Đình Khương
DF	32	(Vietnam) Trần Văn Vũ			(substituted off) 13'
DF	77	(Vietnam) Nguyễn Đình Lợi
DF	93	(France) Chaher Zarour (c)
MF	8	(Vietnam) Lê Cao Hoài An
MF	13	(Vietnam) Nguyễn Hoàng Quốc Chí
MF	16	(Vietnam) Nguyễn Đình Nhơn		Booked
MF	19	(Vietnam) Nguyễn Tấn Tài
MF	24	(Vietnam) Lê Duy Thanh			(substituted off) 66'
FW	36	(France) Youssouf Touré	42'
Substitutes:
GK	1	(Vietnam) Trần Thế Kiệt
DF	3	(Vietnam) Trần Trọng Bình			(substituted in) 13'
DF	23	(Vietnam) Nguyễn Trung Hiếu
DF	29	(Vietnam) Đoàn Công Thành
MF	6	(Vietnam) Hoàng Nhật Nam
MF	28	(Vietnam) Nguyễn Cửu Huy Hoàng
FW	20	(Vietnam) Trần Đình Kha			(substituted in) 66'
Head Coach:
(Vietnam) Võ Đình Tân

Lineups:
GK	1	(Thailand) Kawin Thamsatchanan (c)
DF	3	(Thailand) Theerathon Bunmathan
DF	25	(Thailand) Adisorn Promrak			(substituted off) 50'
DF	59	(Thailand) Nukoolkit Krutyai		Booked
MF	6	(Thailand) Sarach Yooyen	87'		(substituted off) 89'
MF	8	(Thailand) Thossawat Limwannasathian			(substituted off) 82'
MF	15	(South Korea) Lee Ho
MF	21	(Thailand) Prakit Deeprom			(substituted off) 68'
MF	34	(Thailand) Wattana Playnum
FW	9	(Thailand) Adisak Kraisorn	6', 90+3'
FW	99	(Thailand) Siroch Chatthong
Substitutes:
GK	28	(Thailand) Prasit Padungchok
DF	2	(Thailand) Peerapat Notchaiya
DF	4	(Thailand) Suporn Peenagatapho			(substituted in) 50'
DF	33	(Thailand) Pitakpong Kulasuwan
MF	13	(Thailand) Ratchapol Nawanno			(substituted in) 82'
MF	16	(Thailand) Sanukran Thinjom			(substituted in) 89'
FW	10	(Thailand) Teerasil Dangda			(substituted in) 68'
Head Coach:
(Thailand) Totchtawan Sripan

Assistant referees:
(Malaysia) Mohd Yusri bin Muhamad
(Malaysia) Mohd Khalid bin Mohd Aris
Fourth official:
(Malaysia) Muhd Nazmi Nasaruddin
Match Commissioner:
(Laos) Kanya Koemany
General Coordinator:
(Vietnam) Ngô Thị Phương Thảo

=== Second leg ===
6 January 2018
19:00 UTC+7

SCG Muangthong United (Thailand)	4–0	(Vietnam) Sanna Khánh Hòa BVN
Adisak 54'; Thossawat 57'; Teerasil 78'; Siroch 89'	Report; Highlight

Supachalasai Stadium, Bangkok
Attendance: 15,000
Referee: Sukhbir Singh (Singapore)

SCG Muangthong United	Sanna Khánh Hòa BVN

Lineups:
GK	1	(Thailand) Kawin Thamsatchanan
DF	3	(Thailand) Theerathon Bunmathan		(substituted off) 81'
DF	29	(Brazil) Célio Santos
DF	34	(Thailand) Wattana Playnum		(substituted off) 81'
DF	59	(Thailand) Nukoolkit Krutyai
MF	6	(Thailand) Sarach Yooyen		(substituted off) 85'
MF	8	(Thailand) Thossawat Limwannasathian	57'	(substituted off) 74'
MF	15	(South Korea) Lee Ho
FW	7	(Brazil) Heberty Fernandes		(substituted off) 85'
FW	9	(Thailand) Adisak Kraisorn	54'	(substituted off) 74'
FW	10	(Thailand) Teerasil Dangda (c)	78'
Substitutes:
GK	28	(Thailand) Prasit Padungchok
DF	2	(Thailand) Peerapat Notchaiya		(substituted in) 74'
DF	4	(Thailand) Suporn Peenagatapho		(substituted in) 81'
MF	13	(Thailand) Ratchapol Nawanno		(substituted in) 85'
MF	21	(Thailand) Prakit Deeprom		(substituted in) 85'
FW	77	(Brazil) Leandro Assumpção		(substituted in) 74'
FW	99	(Thailand) Siroch Chatthong	89'	(substituted in) 81'
Head Coach:
(Thailand) Totchtawan Sripan

Lineups:
GK	26	(Vietnam) Nguyễn Tuấn Mạnh
DF	9	(Vietnam) Trần Đình Khương
DF	39	(Vietnam) Nguyễn Tấn Điền
DF	93	(France) Chaher Zarour (c)
MF	8	(Vietnam) Lê Cao Hoài An
MF	13	(Vietnam) Nguyễn Hoàng Quốc Chí
MF	16	(Vietnam) Nguyễn Đình Nhơn	(substituted off) 87'
MF	19	(Vietnam) Nguyễn Tấn Tài
MF	24	(Vietnam) Lê Duy Thanh	(substituted off) 46'
FW	7	(Vietnam) Lâm Ti Phông	(substituted off) 67'
FW	36	(France) Youssouf Touré
Substitutes:
GK	1	(Vietnam) Trần Thế Kiệt
DF	3	(Vietnam) Trần Trọng Bình
DF	23	(Vietnam) Nguyễn Trung Hiếu
DF	32	(Vietnam) Trần Văn Vũ	(substituted in) 67'
MF	6	(Vietnam) Hoàng Nhật Nam	(substituted in) 87'
MF	28	(Vietnam) Nguyễn Cửu Huy Hoàng
FW	20	(Vietnam) Trần Đình Kha	(substituted in) 46'
Head Coach:
(Vietnam) Võ Đình Tân

Assistant referees:
(Singapore) Lim Kok Heng
(Singapore) Abdul Hannan
Fourth official:
(Singapore) Nathan Chan Rong De
Match Commissioner:
(Vietnam) Trần Thị Lan Hương
General Coordinator:
(Thailand) Rumpha Varaveerakul

== Winners ==
2017 Mekong Club Championship
Winners
SCG Muangthong United
First Title
