= Vietnamese football clubs in Southeast Asian competitions =

These are the results of Vietnamese clubs in the ASEAN Football Federation (AFF) competitions, including the ASEAN Club Championship, and Mekong Club Championship.

Hoàng Anh Gia Lai entered the inaugural ASEAN Club Championship in 2003.

In results, Becamex Bình Dương became the first Vietnamese team to win an ASEAN title. Công An Hà Nội finished as runners-up on 2024–25 ASEAN Club Championship, their best result to date.

== Appearances in ASEAN competitions ==
As of 19 November 2026

Club	Total						ACC	MCC	First appearance	Last appearance
Club	Ss	Pld	W	D	L	Win%	ACC	MCC	First appearance	Last appearance
Công An Hà Nội	3	16	9	3	4	56.25	3	0	2024–25 ACC	2026–27 ACC
Hoàng Anh Gia Lai	2	7	3	1	3	42.86	2	0	2003 ACC	2005 ACC
Becamex Bình Dương	2	3	2	0	1	66.67	0	2	2014 MCC	2015 MCC
Thép Xanh Nam Định	1	7	4	1	2	57.14	1	0	2025–26 ACC	
Sanna Khánh Hòa	1	5	2	1	2	40.00	0	1	2017 MCC	
Đông Á Thanh Hóa	1	5	1	3	1	20.00	1	0	2024–25 ACC	
Công An Hồ Chí Minh City	1	2	1	1	0	50.00	1	0	2026–27 ACC	
SHB Đà Nẵng	1	2	0	1	1	0.00	0	1	2016 MCC	
Hà Nội	1	0	0	0	0	—	1	0	2022 ACC	

== Vietnamese clubs in ASEAN Club Championship ==
=== ASEAN Club Championship participations ===
- QPO: Qualifying play-off round, GS: Group stage, QF: Quarter-finals, SF: Semi-finals, RU: Runners-up, W: Winners

Participations
Team	Qualified	2003	2005	2022	2024–25	2025–26	2026–27
Công An Hà Nội	3 times				RU	GS	GS
Hoàng Anh Gia Lai	2 times	QF	SF				
Thép Xanh Nam Định	1 time					SF	
Hà Nội	1 time			GS (Note: Competition cancelled due to the COVID-19 pandemic.)			
Đông Á Thanh Hóa	1 time				GS		
Công An Hồ Chí Minh CIty	1 time						GS

Italic is for unloaded results.

=== Results in ASEAN Club Championship ===
Match won	Match drawn	Match lost

Season	Club	Round	Opponent	Home	Away	Aggregate
2003	(Vietnam) Hoàng Anh Gia Lai	Group C	(Indonesia) Persita Tangerang	1–2		2nd out of 3
2003	(Vietnam) Hoàng Anh Gia Lai	Group C	(Laos) MCTPC	2–1		2nd out of 3
2003	(Vietnam) Hoàng Anh Gia Lai	Quarter-finals	(Thailand) BEC Tero Sasana	1–2		
2005	(Vietnam) Hoàng Anh Gia Lai	Group A	(Malaysia) Pahang	0–4		2nd out of 4
2005	(Vietnam) Hoàng Anh Gia Lai	Group A	(Cambodia) Nagaworld	5–1		2nd out of 4
2005	(Vietnam) Hoàng Anh Gia Lai	Group A	(Timor-Leste) Zebra Baucau	14–1		2nd out of 4
2005	(Vietnam) Hoàng Anh Gia Lai	Semi-finals	(Singapore) Tampines Rovers	0–0 (a.e.t.) (3–5 p)		
2024–25	(Vietnam) Công An Hà Nội	Group B	(Thailand) Buriram United	2–1	—N/a	1st out of 6
2024–25	(Vietnam) Công An Hà Nội	Group B	(Singapore) Lion City Sailors	5–0	—N/a	1st out of 6
2024–25	(Vietnam) Công An Hà Nội	Group B	(Philippines) Kaya–Iloilo	—N/a	2–1	1st out of 6
2024–25	(Vietnam) Công An Hà Nội	Group B	(Malaysia) Kuala Lumpur City	—N/a	3–2	1st out of 6
2024–25	(Vietnam) Công An Hà Nội	Group B	(Indonesia) Borneo	3–2	—N/a	1st out of 6
2024–25	(Vietnam) Công An Hà Nội	Semi-finals	(Indonesia) PSM Makassar	2–0	0–1	2–1
2024–25	(Vietnam) Công An Hà Nội	Final	(Thailand) Buriram United	2–2	3–3 (a.e.t.)	5–5 (2–3 p)
2024–25	(Vietnam) Đông Á Thanh Hóa	Group A	(Myanmar) Shan United	3–1	—N/a	5th out of 6
2024–25	(Vietnam) Đông Á Thanh Hóa	Group A	(Malaysia) Terengganu	—N/a	2–2	5th out of 6
2024–25	(Vietnam) Đông Á Thanh Hóa	Group A	(Thailand) BG Pathum United	—N/a	1–1	5th out of 6
2024–25	(Vietnam) Đông Á Thanh Hóa	Group A	(Cambodia) PKR Svay Rieng	0–0	—N/a	5th out of 6
2024–25	(Vietnam) Đông Á Thanh Hóa	Group A	(Indonesia) PSM Makassar	—N/a	0–3	5th out of 6
2025–26	(Vietnam) Công An Hà Nội	Group A	(Thailand) BG Pathum United	—N/a	1–2	4th out of 6
2025–26	(Vietnam) Công An Hà Nội	Group A	(Philippines) Dynamic Herb Cebu	1–0	—N/a	4th out of 6
2025–26	(Vietnam) Công An Hà Nội	Group A	(Thailand) Buriram United	—N/a	1–1	4th out of 6
2025–26	(Vietnam) Công An Hà Nội	Group A	(Malaysia) Selangor	—N/a	0–2	4th out of 6
2025–26	(Vietnam) Công An Hà Nội	Group A	(Singapore) Tampines Rovers	6–1	—N/a	4th out of 6
2025–26	(Vietnam) Nam Định	Group B	(Cambodia) PKR Svay Rieng	2–1	—N/a	1st out of 6
2025–26	(Vietnam) Nam Định	Group B	(Myanmar) Shan United	—N/a	3–0	1st out of 6
2025–26	(Vietnam) Nam Định	Group B	(Thailand) Bangkok United	—N/a	1–4	1st out of 6
2025–26	(Vietnam) Nam Định	Group B	(Singapore) Lion City Sailors	3–0	—N/a	1st out of 6
2025–26	(Vietnam) Nam Định	Group B	(Malaysia) Johor Darul Ta'zim	—N/a	1–1	1st out of 6
2025–26	(Vietnam) Nam Định	Semi-finals	(Malaysia) Selangor	0–2	1–2	1–4
2026–27	(Vietnam) Công An Hồ Chí Minh City	Group A	(Thailand) Ratchaburi	—N/a	1–1	
2026–27	(Vietnam) Công An Hồ Chí Minh City	Group A	(Thailand) Buriram United	1–0	—N/a	
2026–27	(Vietnam) Công An Hồ Chí Minh City	Group A	(Singapore) Tampines Rovers	—N/a		
2026–27	(Vietnam) Công An Hồ Chí Minh City	Group A	(Malaysia) Kuching City		—N/a	
2026–27	(Vietnam) Công An Hồ Chí Minh City	Group A	(Indonesia) Borneo		—N/a	
2026–27	(Vietnam) Công An Hồ Chí Minh City	Group A	(Philippines) Manila Digger	—N/a		
2026–27	(Vietnam) Công An Hà Nội	Group B	(Singapore) Lion City Sailors	—N/a	0–1	
2026–27	(Vietnam) Công An Hà Nội	Group B	(Malaysia) Johor Darul Ta'zim	1–3	—N/a	
2026–27	(Vietnam) Công An Hà Nội	Group B	(Cambodia) PKR Svay Rieng		—N/a	
2026–27	(Vietnam) Công An Hà Nội	Group B	(Myanmar) Shan United		—N/a	
2026–27	(Vietnam) Công An Hà Nội	Group B	(Indonesia) Persib	—N/a		
2026–27	(Vietnam) Công An Hà Nội	Group B	(Thailand) Port	—N/a		

== Vietnamese clubs in Mekong Club Championship ==
=== Mekong Club Championship participations ===
- R1: First round, SF: Semi-finals, RU: Runners-up, W : Winners

Participations
Team	Qualified	2014	2015	2016	2017
Becamex Bình Dương	2 times	W	SF		
SHB Đà Nẵng	1 time			R1	
Sanna Khánh Hòa	1 time				RU

=== Results in Mekong Club Championship ===
Match won	Match drawn	Match lost

Season	Club	Round	Opponent	Home	Away	Aggregate
2014	(Vietnam) Becamex Bình Dương	Semi-finals	(Cambodia) Phnom Penh Crown	5–2		
2014	(Vietnam) Becamex Bình Dương	Final	(Myanmar) Ayeyawady United	4–1		
2015	(Vietnam) Becamex Bình Dương	Semi-finals	(Cambodia) Boeung Ket Angkor	2–3	—N/a	
2016	(Vietnam) SHB Đà Nẵng	First round	(Laos) Lanexang United	2–3	—N/a	3rd out of 3
2016	(Vietnam) SHB Đà Nẵng	First round	(Myanmar) Yadanarbon	—N/a	2–2	3rd out of 3
2017	(Vietnam) Sanna Khánh Hòa	First round	(Cambodia) Boeung Ket Angkor	4–4	5–1	9–5
2017	(Vietnam) Sanna Khánh Hòa	Semi-final	(Laos) Lao Toyota	—N/a	2–0	—N/a
2017	(Vietnam) Sanna Khánh Hòa	Final	(Thailand) Muangthong United	1–3	0–4	1–7

== See also ==
- Vietnamese football clubs in Asian competitions
