= 2017 SCG Muangthong United F.C. season =

SCG Muangthong United
2017 season
- Chairman: Pongsak Phol-Anan
- Manager: Totchtawan Sripan
- Stadium: SCG Stadium, Pak Kret, Nonthaburi, Thailand
- Thai League T1: 2nd
- Thai FA Cup: Semi-finals
- Thai League Cup: Winners
- Thailand Champions Cup: Winners
- Toyota Premier Cup: Runners-up
- Mekong Club Championship: Winners
- AFC Champions League: Round of 16
- Top goalscorer: League: Teerasil Dangda (14); All: Teerasil Dangda (27)
| Home colours | Away colours | Third colours |

The 2017 season was SCG Muangthong United's ninth season in the Thai League T1 since 2009.

== Thailand Champions Cup ==
The 2017 Thailand Champions Cup. It features SCG Muangthong United the winners of the 2016 Thai League and Sukhothai the winners of the 2016 Thai FA Cup. It features at Supachalasai Stadium.

| Date | Opponents | H / A | Result F–A | Scorer(s) |
|---|---|---|---|---|
| 22 January 2017 | Sukhothai | N | 5–0 | Xisco 22', Cleiton (2) 40', 58', Sarach 56', Teerasil 85' |

== Toyota Premier Cup ==
The 2017 Toyota Premier Cup. It features SCG Muangthong United the winners of the 2016 Thai League Cup and Sanfrecce Hiroshima as an invited team from the 2016 J1 League (Japan). It features at Supachalasai Stadium. It is sponsored by Toyota.

| Date | Opponents | H / A | Result F–A | Scorer(s) |
|---|---|---|---|---|
| 4 February 2017 | (Japan) Sanfrecce Hiroshima | N | 1–3 | Teerasil 85' |

== Thai League ==
| Date | Opponents | H / A | Result F–A | Scorers | League position |
|---|---|---|---|---|---|
| 11 February 2017 | Bangkok Glass | A | 4–0 | Xisco (2) 8', 67', Cleiton 65', Peerapat 83' | 2nd |
| 17 February 2017 | Sukhothai | H | 1–0 | Aoyama 53' | 3rd |
| 25 February 2017 | BEC Tero Sasana | A | 1–0 | Adisak 61' | 2nd |
| 5 March 2017 | Chonburi | A | 3–0 | Teerasil 13', Adisak 55', Theerathon 77' | 1st |
| 8 March 2017 | Pattaya United | A | 3–0 | Adisak 12' (pen.), Teerasil 59', Mongkol 88' | 1st |
| 11 March 2017 | Nakhon Ratchasima Mazda | H | 2–0 | Mongkol 20', Teerasil 63' | 1st |
| 3 April 2017 | Buriram United | A | 0–2 | | 2nd |
| 8 April 2017 | Super Power Samut Prakan | A | 4–1 | Theerathon 6', Xisco (3) 17', 77' (pen.), 85' | 1st |
| 19 April 2017 | Sisaket | H | 3–0 | Mongkol 19', Adisak 64', Tristan 89' | 1st |
| 22 April 2017 | Ratchaburi Mitr Phol | A | 1–1 | Theerathon 85' | 1st |
| 30 April 2017 | Suphanburi | H | 3–0 | Teerasil 70', Chanathip (2) 80', 90+1' | 1st |
| 3 May 2017 | Bangkok United | A | 4–2 | Theerathon 21', Teerasil (2) 38', 56', Peerapat 46' | 1st |
| 6 May 2017 | Navy | H | 4–0 | Teerasil (2) 31', 81', Célio 63', Mongkol 72' | 1st |
| 14 May 2017 | Thai Honda Ladkrabang | A | 0–1 | | 1st |
| 17 May 2017 | Port | H | 2–3 | Theerathon 39' (pen.), Teerasil 68' | 1st |
| 20 May 2017 | Ubon UMT United | H | 2–3 | Theerathon 59' (pen.), Teerasil 90+4' | 1st |
| 2 June 2017 | Chiangrai United | H | 4–2 | Adisak 15', Theerathon 45+2', Ratchapol 64', Sanukran 90+2' | 1st |
| 18 June 2017 | Sukhothai | A | 2–2 | Heberty 34', Adisak 70' | 2nd |
| 25 June 2017 | BEC Tero Sasana | H | 2–1 | Assumpção 25', Peerapat 90+1' | 2nd |
| 28 June 2017 | Chonburi | H | 3–1 | Aoyama 65', Assumpção (2) 68', 70' | 2nd |
| 2 July 2017 | Pattaya United | H | 0–0 | | 2nd |
| 5 July 2017 | Nakhon Ratchasima Mazda | A | 1–0 | Assumpção 90+1' | 2nd |
| 9 July 2017 | Buriram United | H | 1–1 | Assumpção 88' | 2nd |
| 30 July 2017 | Super Power Samut Prakan | H | 9–1 | Assumpção (3) 20', 63', 65', Teerasil (2) 33', 71', Heberty 47', Adisak (2) 57', 68', Tristan 82' | 2nd |
| 6 August 2017 | Sisaket | A | 2–2 | Heberty (2) 21', 77' (pen.) | 2nd |
| 10 September 2017 | Ratchaburi Mitr Phol | H | 3–0 | Assumpção 2', Heberty 42', Tristan 80' | 2nd |
| 17 September 2017 | Suphanburi | A | 4–1 | Assumpção (2) 9', 35', Heberty 45', Adul 81' (o.g.) | 2nd |
| 20 September 2017 | Bangkok United | H | 4–0 | Teerasil 38', Heberty (3) 49', 85', 90+1' | 2nd |
| 23 September 2017 | Navy | A | 2–1 | Heberty (2) 35', 56' | 2nd |
| 22 October 2017 | Port | A | 1–1 | Assumpção 66' | 2nd |
| 8 November 2017 | Ubon UMT United | A | 1–2 | Adisak 48' | 2nd |
| 12 November 2017 | Chiangrai United | A | 1–0 | Heberty 61' | 2nd |
| 15 November 2017 | Thai Honda Ladkrabang | H | 0–1 | | 2nd |
| 18 November 2017 | Bangkok Glass | H | 2–0 | Assumpção 13', Teerasil 88' | 2nd |

| Pos | Team | Pld | W | D | L | GF | GA | GD | Pts | Qualification or relegation |
|---|---|---|---|---|---|---|---|---|---|---|
| 1 | Buriram United (C, Q) | 34 | 27 | 5 | 2 | 85 | 22 | +63 | 86 | Qualification to 2018 AFC Champions League Group stage |
| 2 | SCG Muangthong United (Q) | 34 | 22 | 6 | 6 | 79 | 29 | +50 | 72 | Qualification to 2018 AFC Champions League Preliminary round 2 |
| 3 | Bangkok United | 34 | 21 | 3 | 10 | 97 | 57 | +40 | 66 | |
| 4 | Chiangrai United (Q) | 34 | 18 | 6 | 10 | 67 | 42 | +25 | 60 | Qualification to 2018 AFC Champions League Preliminary round 2 (Note: Chiangrai United qualified for the 2018 AFC Champions League Preliminary round 2 as winners of the 2017 Thai FA Cup.) |
| 5 | Bangkok Glass | 34 | 16 | 8 | 10 | 63 | 44 | +19 | 56 | |

Updated to match(es) played on 18 November 2017. Source: Thai League
Rules for classification: 1) Points; 2) Head-to-head points; 3) Head-to-head goals difference; 4) Head-to-head goals scored; 5) Overall goals difference; 6) Overall goals scored; 7) Fair play points; 8) Play-off without extra time;).
(C) Champions; (Q) Qualified for the phase indicated

== Thai FA Cup ==
| Date | Opponents | H / A | Result F–A | Scorers | Round |
|---|---|---|---|---|---|
| 21 June 2017 | Muang Loei United | H | 3–0 | Assumpção 8', Célio 43', Mongkol 90+1' | Round of 64 |
| 2 August 2017 | Chiangmai | A | 2–1 | Wicha 75' (o.g.), Heberty 85' | Round of 32 |
| 27 September 2017 | Lampang | H | 5–0 | Adisak 15' (pen.), Heberty (3) 58', 78', 90+3', Assumpção 84' | Round of 16 |
| 18 October 2017 | PTT Rayong | A | 1–0 | Teerasil 67' | Quarter-finals |
| 1 November 2017 | Chiangrai United | N | 2–2 (a.e.t.) (3–4p) | Chappuis 84', Heberty 87' | Semi-finals |

== Thai League Cup ==
| Date | Opponents | H / A | Result F–A | Scorers | Round |
|---|---|---|---|---|---|
| 26 July 2017 | Bangkok Glass | H | 5–2 | Teerasil 28', Heberty (2) 37', 90+4', Piyachanok 52' (o.g.), Assumpção 87' | Round of 32 |
| 1 October 2017 | Bangkok United | H | 2–1 | Assumpção 68' (pen.), Teerasil 87' | Round of 16 |
| 11 October 2017 | Buriram United | A | 2–0 | Assumpção 57', Theerathon 69' | Quarter-finals |
| 4 November 2017 | BEC Tero Sasana | N | 2–1 | Teerasil (2) 43', 67' | Semi-finals |
| 22 November 2017 | Chiangrai United | N | 2–0 | Peerapat 35', Teerasil 61' | Final |

== Mekong Club Championship ==
| Date | Opponents | H / A | Result F–A | Scorers | Round |
|---|---|---|---|---|---|
| 23 December 2017 | (Vietnam) Sanna Khánh Hòa BVN | A | 3–1 | Adisak (2) 6', 90+3', Sarach 87' | Final first leg |
| 6 January 2018 | (Vietnam) Sanna Khánh Hòa BVN | H | 4–0 (7–1 agg.) | Adisak 54', Thossawat 57', Teerasil 78', Siroch 89' | Final second leg |

== AFC Champions League ==
=== Group stage ===
| Date | Opponents | H / A | Result F–A | Scorers | Group position |
|---|---|---|---|---|---|
| 21 February 2017 | (Australia) Brisbane Roar | A | 0–0 | | 3rd |
| 28 February 2017 | (Japan) Kashima Antlers | H | 2–1 | Theerathon 11', Xisco 90+4' | 1st |
| 14 March 2017 | (South Korea) Ulsan Hyundai | A | 0–0 | | 2nd |
| 12 April 2017 | (South Korea) Ulsan Hyundai | H | 1–0 | Teerasil 37' | 1st |
| 26 April 2017 | (Australia) Brisbane Roar | H | 3–0 | Xisco 37', Chanathip 83', Teerasil 89' | 1st |
| 10 May 2017 | (Japan) Kashima Antlers | A | 1–2 | Teerasil 45' | 2nd |

| Pos | Team | Pld | W | D | L | GF | GA | GD | Pts | Qualification |
|---|---|---|---|---|---|---|---|---|---|---|
| 1 | (Japan) Kashima Antlers | 6 | 4 | 0 | 2 | 13 | 5 | +8 | 12 | Advance to knockout stage |
| 2 | (Thailand) Muangthong United | 6 | 3 | 2 | 1 | 7 | 3 | +4 | 11 | Advance to knockout stage |
| 3 | (South Korea) Ulsan Hyundai | 6 | 2 | 1 | 3 | 9 | 9 | 0 | 7 | |
| 4 | (Australia) Brisbane Roar | 6 | 1 | 1 | 4 | 4 | 16 | −12 | 4 | |

Source: AFC
Rules for classification: Group stage tiebreakers

=== Knockout phase ===
| Date | Opponents | H / A | Result F–A | Scorers | Round |
|---|---|---|---|---|---|
| 23 May 2017 | (Japan) Kawasaki Frontale | H | 1–3 | Teerasil 45+2' | Round of 16 First leg |
| 30 May 2017 | (Japan) Kawasaki Frontale | A | 1–4 (2–7 agg.) | Teerasil 89' | Round of 16 Second leg |

== Squad appearances statistics ==
| No. | Pos. | Name | League | FA Cup | League Cup | Others | Asia | Total |
|---|---|---|---|---|---|---|---|---|
| 1 | GK | (Thailand) Kawin Thamsatchanan (vc) | 26 | 2 | 5 | 1 | 8 | 42 |
| 2 | DF | (Thailand) Peerapat Notchaiya | 16+11 | 2+2 | 3+2 | 0+1 | 6+2 | 27+18 |
| 3 | DF | (Thailand) Theerathon Bunmathan | 29+1 | 5 | 5 | 1 | 8 | 48+1 |
| 5 | DF | (Japan) Naoaki Aoyama | 26+1 | 4 | 5 | 1 | 7+1 | 43+2 |
| 6 | MF | (Thailand) Sarach Yooyen | 3+3 | 2+1 | 2+2 | 1 | 0 | 8+6 |
| 7 | FW | (Brazil) Heberty Fernandes | 14+2 | 4+1 | 5 | 0 | 0 | 22+3 |
| 8 | MF | (Thailand) Thossawat Limwannasathian | 12+3 | 2+2 | 2+1 | 0 | 0 | 16+6 |
| 10 | FW | (Thailand) Teerasil Dangda (c) | 27+4 | 3+1 | 4+1 | 1 | 7 | 42+6 |
| 11 | FW | (Thailand) Adisak Kraisorn | 15+7 | 3 | 3+2 | 0 | 1+3 | 22+12 |
| 13 | MF | (Thailand) Ratchapol Nawanno | 9+1 | 1 | 0+1 | 0 | 3 | 13+2 |
| 15 | MF | (South Korea) Lee Ho | 18+1 | 1+1 | 2 | 0 | 6+1 | 27+3 |
| 16 | MF | (Thailand) Sanukran Thinjom | 4+9 | 1 | 0 | 0+1 | 1+4 | 6+14 |
| 19 | DF | (Thailand) Tristan Do | 25+2 | 3 | 2 | 1 | 7 | 38+2 |
| 21 | MF | (Thailand) Prakit Deeprom | 6+2 | 1 | 0 | 0 | 0 | 7+2 |
| 23 | MF | (Thailand) Charyl Chappuis | 12+1 | 3 | 3+1 | 0 | 0 | 18+2 |
| 25 | DF | (Thailand) Adison Promrak | 12+5 | 2+2 | 1+1 | 0 | 5+1 | 20+9 |
| 28 | GK | (Thailand) Prasit Padungchok | 8 | 3 | 0 | 0 | 0 | 11 |
| 29 | DF | (Brazil) Célio Santos | 29+1 | 5 | 4 | 0 | 5 | 43+1 |
| 33 | MF | (Thailand) Pitakpong Kulasuwan | 5+4 | 1+1 | 0+1 | 0 | 0+1 | 6+7 |
| 34 | MF | (Thailand) Wattana Playnum | 16+7 | 1 | 2+1 | 1 | 6+1 | 26+9 |
| 37 | GK | (Thailand) Putthipong Promlee | 0 | 0 | 0 | 0 | 0 | 0 |
| 59 | DF | (Thailand) Nukoolkit Krutyai | 3+1 | 0 | 2 | 0 | 0 | 5+1 |
| 77 | FW | (Brazil) Leandro Assumpção | 15+1 | 4+1 | 3+1 | 0 | 0 | 22+3 |
| 99 | FW | (Thailand) Siroch Chatthong | 6+5 | 1+3 | 2+1 | 0 | 0 | 9+9 |
Left club during season
| – | DF | (Spain) Mario Abrante | 0 | 0 | 0 | 1 | 0 | 1 |
| – | FW | (Brazil) Cleiton Silva | 1+1 | 0 | 0 | 1 | 0 | 2+1 |
| – | MF | (Thailand) Chanathip Songkrasin | 16+1 | 0 | 0 | 1 | 7+1 | 24+2 |
| – | DF | (Thailand) Suphan Thongsong | 3+3 | 0 | 0 | 0 | 1+3 | 4+6 |
| – | MF | (Thailand) Wongsakorn Chaikultewin | 0+5 | 0 | 0 | 0 | 0+1 | 0+6 |
| – | MF | (Thailand) Mongkol Tossakrai | 10+5 | 1 | 0 | 0+1 | 5+1 | 16+7 |
| – | FW | (Spain) Xisco Jiménez | 5+3 | 0 | 0 | 1 | 5 | 11+3 |
| – | DF | (Thailand) Sakda Fai-in | 0 | 0 | 0 | 0 | 0 | 0 |
| – | MF | (Thailand) Sorawit Panthong | 1+3 | 0 | 0 | 0 | 0+1 | 1+4 |

== Squad goals statistics ==
| No. | Pos. | Name | League | FA Cup | League Cup | Others | Asia | Total |
|---|---|---|---|---|---|---|---|---|
| 1 | GK | (Thailand) Kawin Thamsatchanan (vc) | 0 | 0 | 0 | 0 | 0 | 0 |
| 2 | DF | (Thailand) Peerapat Notchaiya | 3 | 0 | 1 | 0 | 0 | 4 |
| 3 | DF | (Thailand) Theerathon Bunmathan | 7 | 0 | 1 | 0 | 1 | 9 |
| 5 | DF | (Japan) Naoaki Aoyama | 1 | 0 | 0 | 0 | 0 | 1 |
| 6 | MF | (Thailand) Sarach Yooyen | 0 | 0 | 0 | 1 | 0 | 1 |
| 7 | FW | (Brazil) Heberty Fernandes | 12 | 5 | 2 | 0 | 0 | 19 |
| 8 | MF | (Thailand) Thossawat Limwannasathian | 0 | 0 | 0 | 0 | 0 | 0 |
| 10 | FW | (Thailand) Teerasil Dangda (c) | 14 | 1 | 5 | 2 | 5 | 27 |
| 11 | FW | (Thailand) Adisak Kraisorn | 9 | 1 | 0 | 0 | 0 | 10 |
| 13 | MF | (Thailand) Ratchapol Nawanno | 1 | 0 | 0 | 0 | 0 | 1 |
| 15 | MF | (South Korea) Lee Ho | 0 | 0 | 0 | 0 | 0 | 0 |
| 16 | MF | (Thailand) Sanukran Thinjom | 1 | 0 | 0 | 0 | 0 | 1 |
| 19 | DF | (Thailand) Tristan Do | 3 | 0 | 0 | 0 | 0 | 3 |
| 21 | MF | (Thailand) Prakit Deeprom | 0 | 0 | 0 | 0 | 0 | 0 |
| 23 | MF | (Thailand) Charyl Chappuis | 0 | 1 | 0 | 0 | 0 | 1 |
| 25 | DF | (Thailand) Adison Promrak | 0 | 0 | 0 | 0 | 0 | 0 |
| 28 | GK | (Thailand) Prasit Padungchok | 0 | 0 | 0 | 0 | 0 | 0 |
| 29 | DF | (Brazil) Célio Santos | 1 | 1 | 0 | 0 | 0 | 2 |
| 33 | MF | (Thailand) Pitakpong Kulasuwan | 0 | 0 | 0 | 0 | 0 | 0 |
| 34 | MF | (Thailand) Wattana Playnum | 0 | 0 | 0 | 0 | 0 | 0 |
| 37 | GK | (Thailand) Putthipong Promlee | 0 | 0 | 0 | 0 | 0 | 0 |
| 59 | DF | (Thailand) Nukoolkit Krutyai | 0 | 0 | 0 | 0 | 0 | 0 |
| 77 | FW | (Brazil) Leandro Assumpção | 13 | 2 | 3 | 0 | 0 | 18 |
| 99 | FW | (Thailand) Siroch Chatthong | 0 | 0 | 0 | 0 | 0 | 0 |
Left club during season
| – | DF | (Spain) Mario Abrante | 0 | 0 | 0 | 0 | 0 | 0 |
| – | FW | (Brazil) Cleiton Silva | 1 | 0 | 0 | 2 | 0 | 3 |
| – | MF | (Thailand) Chanathip Songkrasin | 2 | 0 | 0 | 0 | 1 | 3 |
| – | DF | (Thailand) Suphan Thongsong | 0 | 0 | 0 | 0 | 0 | 0 |
| – | MF | (Thailand) Wongsakorn Chaikultewin | 0 | 0 | 0 | 0 | 0 | 0 |
| – | MF | (Thailand) Mongkol Tossakrai | 4 | 1 | 0 | 0 | 0 | 5 |
| – | FW | (Spain) Xisco Jiménez | 5 | 0 | 0 | 1 | 2 | 8 |
| – | DF | (Thailand) Sakda Fai-in | 0 | 0 | 0 | 0 | 0 | 0 |
| – | MF | (Thailand) Sorawit Panthong | 0 | 0 | 0 | 0 | 0 | 0 |

== Transfers ==
First Thai footballer's market is opening on 14 December 2016 to 28 January 2017
Second Thai footballer's market is opening on 3 June 2017 to 30 June 2017

=== In ===
| Date | Pos. | Name | From |
|---|---|---|---|
| 28 November 2016 | GK | (Thailand) Prasit Padungchok | (Thailand) BEC Tero Sasana |
| 10 December 2016 | MF | (Thailand) Ratchapol Nawanno | (Thailand) Chainat Hornbill |
| 10 December 2016 | MF | (Thailand) Pitakpong Kulasuwan | (Thailand) BEC Tero Sasana |
| 10 December 2016 | GK | (Thailand) Putthipong Promlee | (Thailand) BEC Tero Sasana |
| 2 January 2017 | MF | (South Korea) Lee Ho | (South Korea) Jeonbuk Hyundai Motors |
| 7 February 2017 | DF | (Brazil) Célio Santos | (South Korea) Ulsan Hyundai |
| 25 February 2017 | FW | (Brazil) Heberty Fernandes | (Saudi Arabia) Al-Shabab |
| 1 June 2017 | FW | (Thailand) Siroch Chatthong | (Thailand) Ubon UMT United |
| 1 June 2017 | FW | (Brazil) Leandro Assumpção | (Thailand) Sisaket |
| 1 June 2017 | MF | (Thailand) Prakit Deeprom | (Thailand) Chonburi |
| 16 June 2017 | MF | (Thailand) Charyl Chappuis | (Thailand) Suphanburi |
| 21 June 2017 | DF | (Thailand) Sakda Fai-in | (Thailand) Navy |
| 7 July 2017 | DF | (Thailand) Nukoolkit Krutyai | (Thailand) Ubon UMT United |

=== Out ===
| Date | Pos. | Name | To |
|---|---|---|---|
| 4 November 2016 | DF | (Thailand) Suriya Singmui | (Thailand) Chiangrai United |
| 4 November 2016 | MF | (Thailand) Tanaboon Kesarat | (Thailand) Chiangrai United |
| 26 December 2016 | GK | (Thailand) Pattara Piyapatrakitti | (Thailand) Chiangrai United |
| 5 January 2017 | FW | (France) Michaël N'dri | (Thailand) BEC Tero Sasana |
| 5 January 2017 | FW | (Ivory Coast) Yaya Soumahoro | (Thailand) Free agent |
| 6 January 2017 | DF | (Thailand) Atit Daosawang | (Thailand) BEC Tero Sasana |
| 6 January 2017 | GK | (Thailand) Witsanusak Kaewruang | (Thailand) BEC Tero Sasana |
| 6 January 2017 | MF | (Thailand) Seksit Srisai | (Thailand) BEC Tero Sasana |
| 6 January 2017 | FW | (Thailand) Chainarong Tathong | (Thailand) Pattaya United |
| 1 February 2017 | GK | (Thailand) Panupan Juheang | (Thailand) Bangkok |
| 7 February 2017 | GK | (Thailand) Jakkree Nimnuan | (Thailand) Udon Thani |
| 8 February 2017 | DF | (Spain) Mario Abrante | (Thailand) BEC Tero Sasana |
| 18 February 2017 | FW | (Brazil) Cleiton Silva | (China) Shanghai Shenxin |
| 29 May 2017 | MF | (Thailand) Chaiyawat Buran | (Thailand) Chiangrai United |
| 16 June 2017 | DF | (Thailand) Suphan Thongsong | (Thailand) Suphanburi |
| 22 July 2017 | FW | (Spain) Xisco Jiménez | (Spain) Osasuna |

=== Loan in ===
| Date from | Date to | Pos. | Name | From |
|---|---|---|---|---|
| 1 November 2016 | 27 June 2017 | MF | (Thailand) Mongkol Tossakrai | (Thailand) Army United |
| 3 June 2017 | 31 December 2017 | MF | (Thailand) Thossawat Limwannasathian | (Thailand) Army United |

=== Loan out ===
| Date from | Date to | Pos. | Name | To |
|---|---|---|---|---|
| 5 January 2017 | 30 November 2017 | MF | (Thailand) Patiphan Pinsermsootsri | (Thailand) Nakhon Pathom United |
| 5 January 2017 | 30 November 2017 | MF | (Thailand) Wasan Samarnsin | (Thailand) Nakhon Pathom United |
| 5 January 2017 | 30 November 2017 | MF | (Thailand) Datsakorn Thonglao | (Thailand) BEC Tero Sasana |
| 6 January 2017 | 30 November 2017 | DF | (Thailand) Weerawut Kayem | (Thailand) BEC Tero Sasana |
| 6 January 2017 | 30 November 2017 | MF | (Thailand) Chaiyawat Buran | (Thailand) Pattaya United |
| 6 January 2017 | 30 November 2017 | DF | (Thailand) Suphanan Bureerat | (Thailand) Pattaya United |
| 6 January 2017 | 30 November 2017 | MF | (Thailand) Peeradon Chamratsamee | (Thailand) Pattaya United |
| 26 January 2017 | 30 November 2017 | MF | (Thailand) Kasidech Wettayawong | (Thailand) Pattaya United |
| 3 June 2017 | 31 December 2018 | MF | (Thailand) Chanathip Songkrasin | (Japan) Consadole Sapporo |
| 16 June 2017 | 30 November 2017 | DF | (Thailand) Wongsakorn Chaikultewin | (Thailand) Pattaya United |
| 21 June 2017 | 30 November 2017 | DF | (Thailand) Sakda Fai-in | (Thailand) Bangkok |
| 26 June 2017 | 30 November 2017 | MF | (Thailand) Sorawit Panthong | (Thailand) Sisaket |
