= 2020 V.League 2 =

26th season of V.League 2, Vietnam's second tier professional football league

V.League 2
- Season: 2020
- Dates: 5 June – 31 October
- Champions: Bình Định (2nd title)
- Promoted: Bình Định
- Relegated: Đồng Tháp
- Matches: 96
- Goals: 221 (2.3 per match)
- Top goalscorer: Nguyễn Công Thành (12 goals)
- Biggest home win: Bình Định 4–0 Đắk Lắk (6 June 2020); Sanna Khánh Hòa 4–0 XM Fico Tây Ninh (5 July 2020); Bà Rịa–Vũng Tàu 4–0 XM Fico Tây Ninh (25 September 2020)
- Biggest away win: Bà Rịa–Vũng Tàu 0–4 Bình Định (18 October 2020)
- Highest scoring: Đồng Tháp 5–4 XSKT Cần Thơ (5 June 2020)
- Longest winning run: 6 matches Bình Định
- Longest unbeaten run: 10 matches Bình Định; Phố Hiến
- Longest winless run: 9 matches Long An
- Longest losing run: 5 matches An Giang
- All statistics correct as of 31 October 2020.

The 2020 V.League 2 (referred to as LS V.League 2 for sponsorship reasons) is the 26th season of V.League 2, Vietnam's second tier professional football league. The season began on 5 June 2020 and finished on 31 October 2020.

For this season, there is only 1 promotion and 1 relegation spots due to the effects of the COVID-19 pandemic, and the league will be expand to 14 clubs since the 2021 season.

== Changes from last season ==
=== Team changes ===
The following teams had changed division since the 2018 season.

==== To V.League 2 ====
Promoted from 2019 Vietnamese National Football Second League

- Bà Rịa–Vũng Tàu

Relegated from 2019 V.League 1

- Sanna Khánh Hòa

==== From V.League 2 ====
Relegated to 2020 Vietnamese National Football Second League

- Phù Đổng

Promoted to 2020 V.League 1

- Hồng Lĩnh Hà Tĩnh

== Teams ==
=== Stadia and locations ===
Locations of the 2020 V.League 2 teams

Team	Location	Stadium	Capacity
An Giang	An Giang province	An Giang Stadium	15,200
Bình Định	Bình Định province	Quy Nhơn Stadium	25,000
Bà Rịa–Vũng Tàu	Bà Rịa–Vũng Tàu province	Sân vận động Bà Rịa	8,000
Bình Phước	Bình Phước province	Bình Phước Stadium	10,000
Cần Thơ	Cần Thơ	Cần Thơ Stadium	44,000
Đắk Lắk	Đắk Lắk province	Buôn Ma Thuột Stadium	25,000
Đồng Tháp	Đồng Tháp province	Cao Lãnh Stadium	23,000
Huế	Thừa Thiên-Huế province	Sân vận động Tự Do	25,000
Long An	Long An province	Long An Stadium	19,975
Phố Hiến	Hưng Yên province	PVF Stadium	4,600
Sanna Khánh Hòa	Khánh Hòa province	Nha Trang Stadium	25,000
Tây Ninh	Tây Ninh province	Tây Ninh Stadium	15,500

=== Personnel and kits ===
Team	Manager	Captain	Kit manufacturer	Shirt sponsor
An Giang	(Vietnam) Trịnh Văn Hậu	(Vietnam) Trần Trọng Hiếu	CP SPORT - EGAN	
Bà Rịa Vũng Tàu	(Vietnam) Trần Minh Chiến	(Vietnam) Nguyễn Hải Anh	Masu	SCG
Bình Định	(Vietnam) Nguyễn Đức Thắng		Kamito	
Bình Phước	(Vietnam) Nguyễn Minh Phương	(Vietnam) Nguyễn Vũ Phong		
Đắk Lắk	(Vietnam) Trương Minh Tiến	(Vietnam) Y Thăng Êban		
Đồng Tháp	(Vietnam) Bùi Văn Đông		Grand Sport	XSKT Đồng Tháp, Happy Food, Đại Học Văn Hiến
Huế	(Vietnam) Nguyễn Đức Dũng		Adidas (fake)	
Long An	(Vietnam) Ngô Quang Sang			Cảng Long An, Dong Tam Group
Phố Hiến	(Vietnam) Hứa Hiền Vinh		Grand Sport	Tân Á Đại Thành, Yanmar
Sanna Khánh Hòa BVN	(Vietnam) Võ Đình Tân	(Vietnam) Nguyễn Tuấn Mạnh	VNA Sport	Sanest
XM Fico Tây Ninh	(Vietnam) Nguyễn Đình Hưng	(Vietnam) Trương Đình Luật		Xi măng Fico
XSKT Cần Thơ	(Vietnam) Nguyễn Hữu Đăng	(Vietnam) Lương Văn Nhàn	KeepDri	XSKT Cần Thơ

== Managerial changes ==
Team	Outgoing manager	Manner of departure	Date of vacancy	Position in table	Incoming manager	Date of appointment
Bình Phước	(Vietnam) Nguyễn Minh Phương	Sacked	29 June 2020	11th	(Vietnam) Nguyễn Minh Dung	29 June 2020

== Phase 1 League table ==
Pos	Team	Pld	W	D	L	GF	GA	GD	Pts	Qualification
1	Bà Rịa–Vũng Tàu	11	7	3	1	17	7	+10	24	Qualification to Promotion Group
2	Sanna Khánh Hòa BVN	11	6	2	3	17	8	+9	20	Qualification to Promotion Group
3	Bình Định	11	6	2	3	16	10	+6	20	Qualification to Promotion Group
4	Phố Hiến	11	5	5	1	14	9	+5	20	Qualification to Promotion Group
5	Bình Phước	11	5	2	4	10	9	+1	17	Qualification to Promotion Group
6	An Giang	11	4	3	4	15	12	+3	15	Qualification to Promotion Group
7	Bóng đá Huế	11	4	3	4	13	14	−1	15	Qualification to Relegation Group
8	Tây Ninh	11	4	2	5	9	14	−5	14	Qualification to Relegation Group
9	Đắk Lắk	11	2	4	5	8	13	−5	10	Qualification to Relegation Group
10	XSKT Cần Thơ	11	2	3	6	16	22	−6	9	Qualification to Relegation Group
11	Long An	11	2	3	6	7	15	−8	9	Qualification to Relegation Group
12	Đồng Tháp	11	2	2	7	17	26	−9	8	Qualification to Relegation Group

Updated to match(es) played on 30 September 2020. Source: VPF
Rules for classification: 1) Points; 2) Head-to-head points; 3) Head-to-head goal difference; 4) Head-to-head goals scored; 5) Goal difference; 6) Goals scored.

== Phase 2 League table ==
=== Promotion group ===
Pos	Team	Pld	W	D	L	GF	GA	GD	Pts	Promotion
1	Bình Định (C, P)	16	11	2	3	28	12	+16	35	Promotion to 2021 V.League 1
2	Bà Rịa–Vũng Tàu	16	9	5	2	20	12	+8	32	
3	Sanna Khánh Hòa BVN	16	9	3	4	23	11	+12	30	
4	Phố Hiến	16	7	5	4	19	11	+8	26	
5	Bình Phước	16	5	3	8	12	18	−6	18	
6	An Giang	16	4	5	7	16	20	−4	17	

Updated to match(es) played on 24 October 2020. Source: VPF
Rules for classification: 1) Points; 2) Head-to-head points; 3) Head-to-head goal difference; 4) Head-to-head goals scored; 5) Goal difference; 6) Goals scored.
(C) Champion; (P) Promoted

=== Relegation group ===
Pos	Team	Pld	W	D	L	GF	GA	GD	Pts	Relegation
7	Tây Ninh	16	5	5	6	12	18	−6	20	
8	XSKT Cần Thơ	16	5	4	7	19	24	−5	19	
9	Bóng đá Huế	16	4	6	6	14	19	−5	18	
10	Đắk Lắk	16	3	7	6	14	18	−4	16	
11	Long An	16	4	4	8	12	20	−8	16	
12	Đồng Tháp (R)	16	4	3	9	23	29	−6	15	Relegation to 2021 Second League

Updated to match(es) played on 30 October 2020. Source: VPF
Rules for classification: 1) Points; 2) Head-to-head points; 3) Head-to-head goal difference; 4) Head-to-head goals scored; 5) Goal difference; 6) Goals scored.
(R) Relegated

== Results ==
Home \ Away	ANG	BDN	BRV	BNP	CTH	DKK	DNT	HUẾ	LON	PHH	SKH	TNI
An Giang		1–1	2–2	0–1				1–2			2–0	1–0
Bình Định	2–0			4–1		4–0	2–1	2–1	1–2		1–1	1–0
Bà Rịa–Vũng Tàu		1–0		2–1	1–1		3–2			0–0		4–0
Bình Phước		0–1	1–0		3–2	0–0		1–0	1–0		0–1	
Cần Thơ	2–1	3–2				1–1			0–0		0–1	0–0
Đắk Lắk	1–3		0–1				1–1	0–0		0–1		1–0
Đồng Tháp	1–3			2–2	5–4	2–2		2–3		0–1		0–1
Bóng đá Huế			1–3		2–1						1–0	0–0
Long An	0–0		0–1			0–3	1–2	2–1		0–0		
Phố Hiến	2–1	0–1	0–1	2–1	4–2			2–2			0–1	
Sanna Khánh Hòa			0–1			2–1	3–0		4–1	1–1		4–0
Tây Ninh				1–0	2–0		3–1			1–1		

Updated to match(es) played on 25 July 2020. Source: vpf.vn
Legend: Blue = home team win; Yellow = draw; Red = away team win.

== Positions by round ==
Team ╲ Round	1	2	3	4	5	6	7	8	9	10	11
An Giang	6	5	5	4	5	5	5	5	5	5	6
Bà Rịa–Vũng Tàu	3	3	4	2	2	2	3	3	1	1	1
Bình Định	1	1	3	6	3	4	4	4	4	4	3
Bình Phước	8	12	10	11	9	7	6	8	7	7	5
Đắk Lắk	12	10	11	12	11	10	11	11	11	9	9
Đồng Tháp	4	7	7	8	10	11	9	9	10	11	12
Huế	10	8	9	10	8	6	7	6	6	6	7
Long An	11	9	8	5	6	8	10	10	9	10	11
Phố Hiến	5	4	2	3	4	3	2	2	2	2	4
Sanna Khánh Hòa	2	2	1	1	1	1	1	1	3	3	2
Tây Ninh	9	6	6	7	7	9	8	7	8	8	8
XSKT Cần Thơ	7	11	12	9	12	12	12	12	12	12	10

Qualification to Promotion Group
Qualificaiton to Relegation Group

=== Promotion group ===
Team ╲ Round	12	13	14	15	16
An Giang	6	6	6	6	6
Bà Rịa–Vũng Tàu	1	1	1	2	2
Bình Định	3	3	2	1	1
Bình Phước	5	5	5	5	5
Phố Hiến	4	4	4	4	4
Sanna Khánh Hòa	2	2	3	3	3

Winner; Promoted to V.League 1

=== Relegation group ===
Team ╲ Round	12	13	14	15	16
Đắk Lắk	9	9	9	9	10
Đồng Tháp	12	12	12	11	12
Bóng đá Huế	7	8	8	8	9
Long An	11	11	11	12	11
Tây Ninh	8	7	7	7	7
XSKT Cần Thơ	10	10	10	10	8

Relegation to Second League

== Season progress ==
Team ╲ Round	1	2	3	4	5	6	7	8	9	10	11	12	13	14	15	16
An Giang	W	D	D	W	L	L	W	D	W	L	L	L	L	L	D	D
Bình Định	W	W	L	L	W	L	W	D	W	D	W	W	W	W	W	W
Bà Rịa–Vũng Tàu	W	D	D	W	W	W	L	D	W	W	W	W	W	L	D	D
Bình Phước	L	L	D	L	W	W	W	L	D	W	W	L	L	L	L	D
Cần Thơ	L	L	L	W	L	D	L	D	D	L	W	D	W	L	W	W
Đắk Lắk	L	D	L	L	W	D	L	D	D	W	L	D	W	D	D	L
Đồng Tháp	W	L	D	L	L	L	W	D	L	L	L	D	L	W	W	L
Huế	L	D	D	L	W	W	L	W	D	W	L	L	D	D	L	D
Long An	L	D	W	W	L	L	L	D	D	L	L	L	D	W	L	W
Phố Hiến	W	D	W	D	D	W	W	D	D	W	L	L	L	W	W	L
Sanna Khánh Hòa	W	W	W	W	D	W	L	L	L	D	W	W	W	W	L	D
Tây Ninh	L	W	D	D	L	L	W	W	L	L	W	D	W	L	D	D

Updated to match(es) played on 12 October 2020. Source: VPF
W = Win; D = Draw; L = Lose

=== Schedule ===
- Details (in Vietnamese): https://vpf.vn/tai-lieu-vleague/vleague-thong-bao/lich-thi-dau-giai-vdqg-ls-2020/

== Season statistics ==
=== Top scorers ===
As of 26 October 2020.

Rank	Player	Club	Goals
1	(Vietnam) Nguyễn Công Thành	Đồng Tháp	12
2	(Vietnam) Lê Thanh Bình	Bình Định	6
2	(Vietnam) Nguyễn Hữu Thắng	Bình Định	6
4	(Vietnam) Lê Minh Bình	Bà Rịa–Vũng Tàu	5
4	(Vietnam) Nguyễn Văn Sang	Huế	5
4	(Vietnam) Trần Đình Kha	Sanna Khánh Hòa	5
4	(Vietnam) Trần Văn Tùng	Sanna Khánh Hòa	5
8	(Vietnam) Võ Văn Công	An Giang	4
8	(Vietnam) Trần Hoàng Sơn	Bình Định	4
8	(Vietnam) Ngô Hoàng Anh	Long An	4
8	(Vietnam) Nguyễn Khắc Khiêm	Phố Hiến	4

== See also ==
- 2020 V.League 1
- 2020 Vietnamese National Football Second League
- 2020 Vietnamese National Football Third League
