= Võ Đình Tân =

Vietnamese footballer

Personal information
- Full name: Võ Đình Tân
- Date of birth: 4 October 1967 (age 59)
- Place of birth: Khánh Hòa, South Vietnam
- Height: 1.65 m (5 ft 5 in)
- Position: Defender

Senior career*
Years	Team	Apps	(Gls)
1987–2001	Khánh Hòa	71	(0)

Managerial career
- 2013–2023: Khánh Hòa
- * Club domestic league appearances and goals

Võ Đình Tân (born 4 October 1967) is a Vietnamese football manager and former footballer.

== Early life ==
A native of Khánh Hòa, he spent his entire career playing for his hometown club Khánh Hòa from 1987 until his retirement in 2001.

== Career ==
After his retirement, Tân continued to work as a manager for Khánh Hòa youth teams before he was named as the manager of the senior team in 2013. He helped the club promote to the V.League 2 in 2013 before winning a promotion to the V.League 1 in 2015. He resigned from his position in 2023 after 10 years.
