= Trần Đình Khương =

Vietnamese footballer (born 1996)

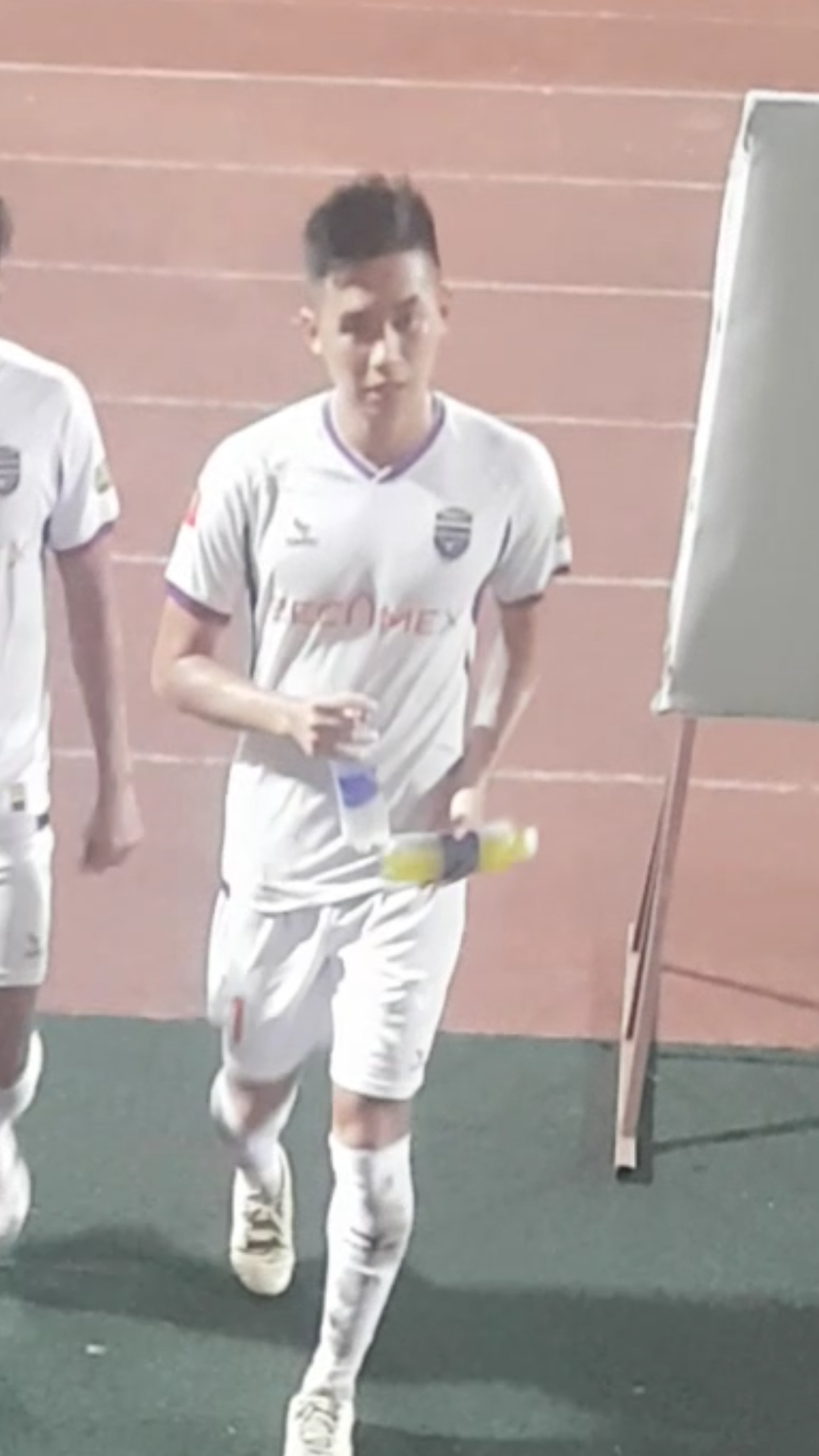
- Đình Khương in 2024

Personal information
- Full name: Trần Đình Khương
- Date of birth: 10 January 1996 (age 30)
- Place of birth: Khánh Sơn, Khánh Hòa, Vietnam
- Height: 1.80 m (5 ft 11 in)
- Positions: Defensive midfielder; centre back

Team information
- Current team: Becamex Bình Dương
- Number: 21

Youth career
- 2013–2015: Sanna Khánh Hòa BVN

Senior career*
Years	Team	Apps	(Gls)
2015–2020	Sanna Khánh Hòa BVN	80	(1)
2020–2022	Hồ Chí Minh City	37	(0)
2023–	Becamex Bình Dương	65	(0)

International career^{‡}
2017–2018	Vietnam	2	(0)
- * Club domestic league appearances and goals as of 7 June 2026 ‡ National team caps and goals as of 13:42, 4 June 2017 (UTC)

Trần Đình Khương (born 10 January 1996) is a Vietnamese professional footballer who plays as a defensive midfielder or a centre back for V.League 1 club Becamex Bình Dương and the Vietnam national team.

== Club career ==
Trần Đình Khương came through the youth academy of Sanna Khánh Hòa. In 2017, he was promoted to the first team and made his V.League 1 debut in a match against Sài Gòn FC. In 2019, Tran Dinh Khuong joined Ho Chi Minh City FC. In 4 seasons playing for Ho Chi Minh City FC, he played 83 matches and scored 5 goals.

In December 2022, Tran Dinh Khuong transferred to play for Binh Duong FC, with a contract term of 2 years.

== International career ==
Trần was first called up to the Vietnam senior side in March 2017, and made his debut in a friendly against Chinese Taipei.

On May 24, 2022, Đình Khương was called up to the national team for the first time under coach Park Hang-seo to prepare for the friendly match against Afghanistan.

== Personal life ==
He is the brother of Khánh Hòa player Trần Đình Kha.

== Career statistics ==
=== International ===
As of match played 31 May 2017.

National team	Year	Apps	Goals
Vietnam	2017	1	0
Total		1	0
