= Vietnamese football clubs in Asian competitions =

These are the results of Vietnamese clubs in the Asian Football Confederation competitions, including the AFC Champions League Elite, AFC Champions League Two and the former Asian Cup Winners' Cup. This details the participation and performances in the competition since its based at 1967.

Quan Thuế entered the inaugural Asian Champion Club Tournament, representing South Vietnam. After the reunification of Vietnam in 1975, the country had a long period of absence in international football stage. Vietnam made its return in Asian club competitions in 1992, when their clubs participated in the 1992–93 Asian Club Championship and 1992–93 Asian Cup Winners' Cup.

In results, Vietnamese teams had reached the semi-finals of the AFC Champions League Two (formerly AFC Cup) on two occasions, in 2009 AFC Cup by Bình Dương and ten years later in 2019 by Hà Nội. Quảng Nam-Đà Nẵng reached the semi-finals of the defuncted Asian Cup Winners' Cup in 1993.

== Appearances in AFC competitions ==
As of 4 November 2026

Club	Total						ACLE	ACL2	ACWC	First appearance	Last appearance
Club	Ss	Pld	W	D	L	Win%	ACLE	ACL2	ACWC	First appearance	Last appearance
Hà Nội	8	49	25	9	15	51.02	6	5	0	2011 AC	2023–24 ACL
Becamex Hồ Chí Minh City	6	46	18	7	21	39.13	3	3	0	2008 ACL	2019 AC
SHB Đà Nẵng	6	31	10	4	17	32.26	3	2	2	1992–93 ACWC	2013 AC
Công An Hồ Chí Minh City (2025)	6	14	4	3	7	28.57	4	1	2	1993–94 ACWC	2020 AC
Sông Lam Nghệ An	5	21	9	3	9	42.86	2	3	0	2000–01 ACC	2018 AC
Thể Công–Viettel	4	16	5	3	8	31.25	2	2	0	1999–2000 ACC	2026–27 ACL2
Hải Quan	4	8	0	2	6	0.00	2	0	2	1967 ACCT	1998–99 ACWC
Nam Định	3	20	6	3	11	30.00	1	2	0	2008 ACL	2025–26 ACL2
Hoàng Anh Gia Lai	3	18	3	3	12	16.67	3	0	0	2004 ACL	2022 ACL
Công An Hồ Chí Minh City (1979)	3	8	2	2	4	25.00	1	0	2	1996–97 ACC	2001–02 ACWC
Công An Hà Nội	2	13	4	3	6	30.77	1	1	0	2025–26 ACL2	2026–27 ACLE
Quy Nhơn United	2	12	1	2	9	8.33	2	0	0	2004 ACL	2005 ACL
Hải Phòng	2	10	4	2	4	40.00	1	1	1	1996–97 ACWC	2023–24 AC
Long An	2	8	0	0	8	0.00	2	0	0	2006 ACL	2007 ACL
Thanh Hóa	2	8	2	3	3	25.00	1	1	0	2018 ACL	2018 AC
Vissai Ninh Bình	1	9	7	1	1	77.78	0	1	0	2014 AC	2014 AC
Xuân Thành Sài Gòn	1	6	2	2	2	33.33	0	1	0	2013 AC	2013 AC
Navibank Sài Gòn	1	6	2	2	2	33.33	0	1	0	2012 AC	2012 AC
Hà Nội ACB	1	6	2	0	4	33.33	0	1	0	2009 AC	2009 AC
Hòa Phát Hà Nội	1	6	0	3	3	0.00	0	1	0	2007 AC	2007 AC
Đồng Tháp	1	4	2	1	1	50.00	1	0	0	1997–98 ACC	1997–98 ACC
Cảnh Sát Quốc Gia	1	4	1	1	2	25.00	1	0	0	1969 ACCT	1969 ACCT
An Giang	1	2	1	0	1	50.00	0	0	1	1994–95 ACWC	1994–95 ACWC
Sài Gòn	1	0	0	0	0	—	0	1	0	2021 AC	2021 AC

== Vietnamese clubs in AFC Champions League Elite ==
=== AFC Champions League Elite participations ===
- QR: Qualifying round, PO: Play-off round, GS: Group stage (from 2009 to 2024), LS: League stage (from 2024 to present), R16: Round of 16, QF : Quarter-finals, SF : Semi-finals, RU : Runners-up, W : Winners
- 1967–1972 : Asian Champion Club Tournament
- 1985–2002 : Asian Club Championship
- 2002–2024 : AFC Champions League
- 2024–present : AFC Champions League Elite

Italic is for unloaded results.

Participations
Team	Qualified	1967	1969	92–93	93–94	1995	96–97	97–98	98–99	99–00	00–01	01–02	02–03	2004	2005	2006	2007	2008	2010	2014	2015	2016	2017	2018	2019	2020	2021	2022	2023–24	2026–27
Hà Nội	6 times																			QR2	PO	PO	QR2		PO				GS	
Hồ Chí Minh City	4 times					R1			R1				QR3													QR2				
SHB Đà Nẵng	3 times				R1											GS			PO											
Becamex Bình Dương	3 times																	GS			GS	GS								
Hoàng Anh Gia Lai	3 times													GS	GS													GS		
Hải Quan	2 times	R1		R1																										
Sông Lam Nghệ An	2 times										R1	R1																		
Bình Định	2 times													GS	GS															
Long An	2 times															GS	GS													
Viettel	2 times									R2																	GS			
Cảnh Sát Quốc Gia	1 time		GS																											
Công An Hồ Chí Minh City	1 time						R1																							
Đồng Tháp	1 time							R2																						
Nam Định	1 time																	GS												
Thanh Hóa	1 time																							PO						
Hải Phòng	1 time																												PO	
Công An Hà Nội	1 time																													LS

=== Results in AFC Champions League Elite ===
Match won	Match drawn	Match lost

Season	Club	Round	Opponent	Home	Away	Aggregate
Asian Champion Club Tournament
1967	(South Vietnam) Quan Thuế	First round	(Malaysia) Selangor	1–2	0–0	1–2
1969	(South Vietnam) Cảnh Sát Quốc Gia	Group A	(India) Mysore State	1–2		4th out of 5
1969	(South Vietnam) Cảnh Sát Quốc Gia	Group A	(Philippines) Manila Lions	7–0		4th out of 5
1969	(South Vietnam) Cảnh Sát Quốc Gia	Group A	(South Korea) Krung Thai Bank	1–4		4th out of 5
1969	(South Vietnam) Cảnh Sát Quốc Gia	Group A	(Thailand) Bangkok Bank	1–1		4th out of 5
Asian Club Championship
1992–93	(Vietnam) Hải Quan	First round	(Indonesia) Arseto Solo	0–0	2–3	2–3
1993–94	(Vietnam) Quảng Nam-Đà Nẵng	Preliminary round	(Indonesia) Arema Malang	0–1	1–2	1–3
1995	(Vietnam) Cảng Sài Gòn	First round	(Malaysia) Pahang	w/o (Note: Cảng Sài Gòn withdrew.)		
1996–97	(Vietnam) Công An Hồ Chí Minh City	First round	(Malaysia) Johor	0–1	1–1	1–2
1997–98	(Vietnam) Đồng Tháp	First round	(India) Churchill Brothers	0–0	1–0	1–0
1997–98	(Vietnam) Đồng Tháp	Second round	(Myanmar) Finance and Revenue	3–4	1–0	4–4 (a)
1998–99	(Vietnam) Cảng Sài Gòn	First round	(South Korea) Pohang Steelers	0–2	0–4	0–6
1999–2000	(Vietnam) Thể Công	First round	(Hong Kong) Happy Valley	w/o (Note: Happy Valley withdrew.)		
1999–2000	(Vietnam) Thể Công	Second round	(South Korea) Suwon Samsung Bluewings	1–1	0–6	1–7
2000–01	(Vietnam) Sông Lam Nghệ An	First round	(Indonesia) PSM Makassar	1–4	0–0	1–4
2001–02	(Vietnam) Sông Lam Nghệ An	First round	(Sri Lanka) Saunders	w/o (Note: Sông Lam Nghệ An withdrew.)		
AFC Champions League
2002–03	(Vietnam) Cảng Sài Gòn	Third qualifying round	(India) Churchill Brothers	0–2	1–0	1–2
2004	(Vietnam) Bình Định	Group G	(Japan) Yokohama F. Marinos	0–3	0–6	4th out of 4
2004	(Vietnam) Bình Định	Group G	(South Korea) Seongnam Ilhwa Chunma	1–3	0–2	4th out of 4
2004	(Vietnam) Bình Định	Group G	(Indonesia) Persik Kediri	2–2	0–1	4th out of 4
2004	(Vietnam) Hoàng Anh Gia Lai	Group F	(Indonesia) PSM Makassar	5–1	0–3	2nd out of 4
2004	(Vietnam) Hoàng Anh Gia Lai	Group F	(China) Dalian Shide	3–1	0–2	2nd out of 4
2004	(Vietnam) Hoàng Anh Gia Lai	Group F	(Thailand) Krung Thai Bank	0–1	2–2	2nd out of 4
2005	(Vietnam) Bình Định	Group G	(South Korea) Busan I'Park	0–4	0–8	4th out of 4
2005	(Vietnam) Bình Định	Group G	(Indonesia) Persebaya Surabaya	0–0	0–1	4th out of 4
2005	(Vietnam) Bình Định	Group G	(Thailand) Krung Thai Bank	1–2	1–0	4th out of 4
2005	(Vietnam) Hoàng Anh Gia Lai	Group E	(South Korea) Suwon Samsung Bluewings	1–5	0–6	4th out of 4
2005	(Vietnam) Hoàng Anh Gia Lai	Group E	(Japan) Júbilo Iwata	0–1	0–6	4th out of 4
2005	(Vietnam) Hoàng Anh Gia Lai	Group E	(China) Shenzhen Jianlibao	0–2	0–5	4th out of 4
2006	(Vietnam) Đà Nẵng	Group E	(China) Dalian Shide	0–2	0–1	4th out of 4
2006	(Vietnam) Đà Nẵng	Group E	(Japan) Gamba Osaka	1–5	0–15	4th out of 4
2006	(Vietnam) Đà Nẵng	Group E	(South Korea) Jeonbuk Hyundai Motors	0–1	0–3	4th out of 4
2006	(Vietnam) Đồng Tâm Long An	Group G	(China) Shanghai Shenhua	2–4	1–3	2nd out of 4
2006	(Vietnam) Đồng Tâm Long An	Group G	(Indonesia) Persipura Jayapura	Opponent withdrew		2nd out of 4
2006	(Vietnam) Đồng Tâm Long An	Group G	(Thailand) Provincial Electricity Authority	Opponent withdrew		2nd out of 4
2007	(Vietnam) Đồng Tâm Long An	Group G	(South Korea) Seongnam Ilhwa Chunma	1–2	1–4	4th out of 4
2007	(Vietnam) Đồng Tâm Long An	Group G	(Australia) Adelaide United	0–2	0–3	4th out of 4
2007	(Vietnam) Đồng Tâm Long An	Group G	(China) Shandong Luneng Taishan	2–3	0–4	4th out of 4
2008	(Vietnam) Bình Dương	Group E	(China) Changchun Yatai	0–5	1–2	4th out of 4
2008	(Vietnam) Bình Dương	Group E	(South Korea) Pohang Steelers	1–4	0–0	4th out of 4
2008	(Vietnam) Bình Dương	Group E	(Australia) Adelaide United	1–2	1–4	4th out of 4
2008	(Vietnam) Nam Định	Group F	(China) Beijing Guoan	1–3	0–3	4th out of 4
2008	(Vietnam) Nam Định	Group F	(Japan) Kashima Antlers	0–4	0–6	4th out of 4
2008	(Vietnam) Nam Định	Group F	(Thailand) Krung Thai Bank	2–2	1–9	4th out of 4
2010	(Vietnam) SHB Đà Nẵng	Qualifying play-off	(Thailand) Muangthong United	0–3		
2014	(Vietnam) Hà Nội T&T	Qualifying round 1	(India) Pune	3–0		
2014	(Vietnam) Hà Nội T&T	Qualifying round 2	(Thailand) Muangthong United	0–2		
2015	(Vietnam) Hà Nội T&T	Preliminary round 2	(Indonesia) Persib Bandung	4–0		
2015	(Vietnam) Hà Nội T&T	Play-off round	(South Korea) FC Seoul	0–7		
2015	(Vietnam) Becamex Bình Dương	Group E	(China) Shandong Luneng	2–3	1–3	4th out of 4
2015	(Vietnam) Becamex Bình Dương	Group E	(South Korea) Jeonbuk Hyundai Motors	1–1	0–3	4th out of 4
2015	(Vietnam) Becamex Bình Dương	Group E	(Japan) Kashiwa Reysol	1–0	1–5	4th out of 4
2016	(Vietnam) Hà Nội T&T	Preliminary round 2	(Hong Kong) Kitchee	1–0		
2016	(Vietnam) Hà Nội T&T	Play-off round	(South Korea) Pohang Steelers	0–3		
2016	(Vietnam) Becamex Bình Dương	Group E	(China) Jiangsu Suning	1–1	0–3	4th out of 4
2016	(Vietnam) Becamex Bình Dương	Group E	(Japan) FC Tokyo	1–2	1–3	4th out of 4
2016	(Vietnam) Becamex Bình Dương	Group E	(South Korea) Jeonbuk Hyundai Motors	3–2	0–2	4th out of 4
2017	(Vietnam) Hà Nội	Preliminary round 2	(Hong Kong) Kitchee	2–3		
2018	(Vietnam) Thanh Hóa	Preliminary round 2	(Hong Kong) Eastern	4–2		
2018	(Vietnam) Thanh Hóa	Play-off round	(South Korea) Suwon Samsung Bluewings	1–5		
2019	(Vietnam) Hà Nội	Preliminary round 2	(Thailand) Bangkok United	1–0		
2019	(Vietnam) Hà Nội	Play-off round	(China) Shandong Luneng	1–4		
2020	(Vietnam) Hồ Chí Minh City	Preliminary round 2	(Thailand) Buriram United	1–2		
2021	(Vietnam) Viettel	Group F	(South Korea) Ulsan Hyundai	0–1	0–3	3rd out of 4
2021	(Vietnam) Viettel	Group F	(Philippines) Kaya–Iloilo	1–0	5–0	3rd out of 4
2021	(Vietnam) Viettel	Group F	(Thailand) BG Pathum United	1–3	0–2	3rd out of 4
2022	(Vietnam) Hoàng Anh Gia Lai	Group H	(Japan) Yokohama F. Marinos	1–2	0–2	3rd out of 4
2022	(Vietnam) Hoàng Anh Gia Lai	Group H	(Australia) Sydney FC	1–0	1–1	3rd out of 4
2022	(Vietnam) Hoàng Anh Gia Lai	Group H	(South Korea) Jeonbuk Hyundai Motors	1–1	0–1	3rd out of 4
2023–24	(Vietnam) Hải Phòng	Preliminary round	(Hong Kong) HK Rangers	4–1 (a.e.t.)		
2023–24	(Vietnam) Hải Phòng	Play-off round	(South Korea) Incheon United	1–3 (a.e.t.)		
2023–24	(Vietnam) Hà Nội	Group J	(China) Wuhan Three Towns	2–1	1–2	3rd out of 4
2023–24	(Vietnam) Hà Nội	Group J	(South Korea) Pohang Steelers	2–4	0–2	3rd out of 4
2023–24	(Vietnam) Hà Nội	Group J	(Japan) Urawa Red Diamonds	2–1	0–6	3rd out of 4
AFC Champions League Elite
2026–27	(Vietnam) Công An Hà Nội	Preliminary round	(Australia) Adelaide United	2–0		
2026–27	(Vietnam) Công An Hà Nội	League stage	(Japan Football Association) Gamba Osaka	—N/a	1–4	
2026–27	(Vietnam) Công An Hà Nội	League stage	(Japan Football Association) Kashima Antlers	0–1	—N/a	
2026–27	(Vietnam) Công An Hà Nội	League stage	(Chinese Football Association) Shanghai Port	—N/a	3–2	
2026–27	(Vietnam) Công An Hà Nội	League stage	(Japan Football Association) Kyoto Sanga	0–0	—N/a	
2026–27	(Vietnam) Công An Hà Nội	League stage	(Japan Football Association) Vissel Kobe	–	—N/a	
2026–27	(Vietnam) Công An Hà Nội	League stage	(Japan Football Association) Kashiwa Reysol	—N/a	–	
2026–27	(Vietnam) Công An Hà Nội	League stage	(Chinese Football Association) Beijing Guoan	–	—N/a	
2026–27	(Vietnam) Công An Hà Nội	League stage	(Football Association of Malaysia) Johor Darul Ta'zim	—N/a	–	

=== Overall statistics in AFC Champions League Elite ===
==== By clubs ====
As of 3 November 2026

Overall statistics
#	Team	GP	W	D	L	GF	GA	GD	Pts
1	Hà Nội	14	6	0	8	19	35	-16	18
2	Hoàng Anh Gia Lai	18	3	3	12	15	42	-27	12
3	Becamex Bình Dương	18	2	3	13	16	45	-29	9
4	Đồng Tháp	4	2	1	1	5	4	+1	7
5	Viettel	8	2	1	5	8	16	-8	7
9	Công An Hà Nội	5	2	1	2	6	7	-1	6
6	Bình Định	12	1	2	9	5	32	-27	5
7	Cảnh Sát Quốc Gia	4	1	1	2	10	7	+3	4
8	Hải Phòng	2	1	0	1	5	4	+1	3
10	Thanh Hóa	2	1	0	1	5	7	-2	3
11	Hồ Chí Minh City	5	1	0	4	2	10	-8	3
12	Hải Quan	4	0	2	2	3	5	-2	2
13	Công An Hồ Chí Minh City	2	0	1	1	1	2	-1	1
14	Sông Lam Nghệ An	2	0	1	1	1	4	-3	1
15	Nam Định	6	0	1	5	4	27	-23	1
16	Long An	8	0	0	8	7	25	-18	0
17	SHB Đà Nẵng	9	0	0	9	2	33	-31	0
Total		123	22	17	84	114	305	-191	82

==== Top scorers ====
As of 3 November 2026

Most goalscorers
#	Player	Team	Goals	First goal(s)	Latest goal(s)
1	(Vietnam) Nguyễn Anh Đức	Becamex Bình Dương	5	12 March 2008	6 April 2016
1	(Thailand) Kiatisuk Senamuang	Hoàng Anh Gia Lai	5	11 February 2004	18 May 2004
3	(Vietnam) Phạm Tuấn Hải	Hà Nội	4	23 October 2023	6 December 2023
4	(Brazil) Caíque	Viettel	3	29 June 2021	11 July 2021
4	(Colombia) Brayan Perea	Công An Hà Nội	3	15 September 2026	27 October 2026
6	(Nigeria) Ganiyu Oseni	Becamex Bình Dương	2	24 February 2015	3 March 2015
6	(Vietnam) Lê Công Vinh	Becamex Bình Dương	2	6 May 2015	4 May 2016
6	(Vietnam) Hoàng Ngọc Linh	Nam Định	2	23 April 2008	23 April 2008
6	(Brazil) Antonio Carlos	Long An	2	8 March 2006	3 May 2006
6	(Democratic Republic of the Congo) Tshamala Kabanga	Long An	2	7 March 2007	25 April 2007
6	(Thailand) Dusit Chalermsan	Hoàng Anh Gia Lai	2	11 February 2004	9 March 2005
6	(Thailand) Worrawoot Srimaka	Bình Định	2	6 April 2005	20 April 2005
6	(Thailand) Nirut Surasiang	Bình Định	2	7 April 2004	7 April 2004
6	(Cameroon) Diederrick Joel Tagueu	Hà Nội	2	20 September 2023	20 September 2023
15	(Brazil) Léo Artur	Công An Hà Nội	1	27 October 2026	27 October 2026

== Vietnamese clubs in AFC Champions League Two ==
The Vietnam V.League 1 clubs in the AFC Champions League Two. This details the participation and performances in the competition since its rebranding and reformatting in 2004 and excludes the details of the old AFC Club Championship.

=== AFC Champions League Two participations ===
- Until 2016: GS: Group stage, R16: Round of 16, QF: Quarter-finals, SF: Semi-finals, RU: Runners-up, W: Winners
- From 2017 to 2023–24: GS: Group stage, ZSF: Zonal semi-finals, ZF: Zonal finals, IZSF: Inter-zone play-off semi-finals. IZF: Inter-zone play-off finals, RU: Runners-up, W: Winners
- From 2024–25: GS: Group stage, R16: Round of 16, QF: Quarter-finals, SF: Semi-finals, RU: Runners-up, W: Winners

Italic is for unloaded results.

Participations
Team	Qualified	2007	2009	2010	2011	2012	2013	2014	2017	2018	2019	2020	2021	2022	2023–24	2024–25	2025–26	2026–27
Hà Nội	5 times				GS			QF	GS		IZF		GS (Note: Competition cancelled due to the COVID-19 pandemic.)					
Sông Lam Nghệ An	3 times				R16	GS				GS								
Becamex Hồ Chí Minh City	3 times		SF	R16							ZF							
Than Quảng Ninh	2 times								GS			GS						
SHB Đà Nẵng	2 times			QF			R16											
Nam Định	2 times															R16	GS	
Thể Công–Viettel	2 times													ZSF				GS
Hòa Phát Hà Nội	1 time	GS																
Hà Nội ACB	1 time		GS															
Navibank Sài Gòn	1 time					GS												
Xuân Thành Sài Gòn	1 time						GS											
Vissai Ninh Bình	1 time							QF										
Thanh Hoá	1 time									GS							WD	
Hồ Chí Minh City	1 time											GS						
Sài Gòn	1 time												GS					
Hải Phòng	1 time														GS			
Công An Hà Nội	1 time																R16	

=== Results in AFC Champions League Two ===
Match won	Match drawn	Match lost

Season	Club	Round	Opponent	Home	Away	Aggregate
AFC Cup
2007	(Vietnam) Hòa Phát Hà Nội	Group D	(Malaysia) Negeri Sembilan	0–0	0–0	4th out of 4
2007	(Vietnam) Hòa Phát Hà Nội	Group D	(Hong Kong) Sun Hei	1–2	4–7	4th out of 4
2007	(Vietnam) Hòa Phát Hà Nội	Group D	(Maldives) Victory	0–2	2–2	4th out of 4
2009	(Vietnam) Hà Nội ACB	Group G	(Malaysia) Kedah	3–1	0–7	4th out of 4
2009	(Vietnam) Hà Nội ACB	Group G	(Hong Kong) Eastern	3–0	0–3	4th out of 4
2009	(Vietnam) Hà Nội ACB	Group G	(Thailand) Chonburi	0–2	0–6	4th out of 4
2009	(Vietnam) Bình Dương	Group H	(Singapore) Home United	2–0	1–2	1st out of 4
2009	(Vietnam) Bình Dương	Group H	(Maldives) Club Valencia	3–0	5–0	1st out of 4
2009	(Vietnam) Bình Dương	Group H	(Thailand) PEA	1–1	3–1	1st out of 4
2009	(Vietnam) Bình Dương	Round of 16	(Malaysia) Kedah	8–2		
2009	(Vietnam) Bình Dương	Quarter-finals	(Thailand) Chonburi	2–0	2–2	4–2
2009	(Vietnam) Bình Dương	Semi-finals	(Syria) Al-Karamah	2–1	0–3	2–4
2010	(Vietnam) Bình Dương	Group F	(Malaysia) Selangor	4–0	0–0	2nd out of 4
2010	(Vietnam) Bình Dương	Group F	(Maldives) Victory	3–0	5–0	2nd out of 4
2010	(Vietnam) Bình Dương	Group F	(Indonesia) Sriwijaya	2–1	0–1	2nd out of 4
2010	(Vietnam) Bình Dương	Round of 16	(Vietnam) SHB Đà Nẵng	3–4 (a.e.t.)		
2010	(Vietnam) SHB Đà Nẵng	Group H	(Thailand) Thai Port	0–0	3–2	1st out of 4
2010	(Vietnam) SHB Đà Nẵng	Group H	(Singapore) Geylang United	3–2	1–1	1st out of 4
2010	(Vietnam) SHB Đà Nẵng	Group H	(Hong Kong) Tai Po	3–0	2–1	1st out of 4
2010	(Vietnam) SHB Đà Nẵng	Round of 16	(Vietnam) Bình Dương	4–3 (a.e.t.)		
2010	(Vietnam) SHB Đà Nẵng	Quarter-finals	(Bahrain) Al-Riffa	3–5	0–3	3–8
2011	(Vietnam) Hà Nội T&T	Group G	(Thailand) Muangthong United	0–0	0–4	3rd out of 4
2011	(Vietnam) Hà Nội T&T	Group G	(Singapore) Tampines Rovers	1–1	1–3	3rd out of 4
2011	(Vietnam) Hà Nội T&T	Group G	(Maldives) Victory	2–0	1–0	3rd out of 4
2011	(Vietnam) Sông Lam Nghệ An	Group F	(Hong Kong) TSW Pegasus	1–2	3–2	1st out of 4
2011	(Vietnam) Sông Lam Nghệ An	Group F	(Maldives) VB	4–2	3–1	1st out of 4
2011	(Vietnam) Sông Lam Nghệ An	Group F	(Indonesia) Sriwijaya	4–0	1–3	1st out of 4
2011	(Vietnam) Sông Lam Nghệ An	Round of 16	(Indonesia) Persipura Jayapura	1–3		
2012	(Vietnam) Navibank Sài Gòn	Group H	(Malaysia) Kelantan	1–2	0–0	3rd out of 4
2012	(Vietnam) Navibank Sài Gòn	Group H	(Indonesia) Arema	3–1	2–6	3rd out of 4
2012	(Vietnam) Navibank Sài Gòn	Group H	(Myanmar) Ayeyawady United	4–1	0–2	3rd out of 4
2012	(Vietnam) Sông Lam Nghệ An	Group F	(Malaysia) Terengganu	0–1	2–6	3rd out of 4
2012	(Vietnam) Sông Lam Nghệ An	Group F	(Singapore) Tampines Rovers	3–0	0–0	3rd out of 4
2012	(Vietnam) Sông Lam Nghệ An	Group F	(Hong Kong) Kitchee	1–0	0–2	3rd out of 4
2013	(Vietnam) Xuân Thành Sài Gòn	Group H	(Singapore) Tampines Rovers	2–2	3–2	3rd out of 4
2013	(Vietnam) Xuân Thành Sài Gòn	Group H	(India) East Bengal	0–0	1–4	3rd out of 4
2013	(Vietnam) Xuân Thành Sài Gòn	Group H	(Malaysia) Selangor	2–1	1–3	3rd out of 4
2013	(Vietnam) SHB Đà Nẵng	Group G	(Myanmar) Ayeyawady United	2–1	3–2	2nd out of 4
2013	(Vietnam) SHB Đà Nẵng	Group G	(Maldives) Maziya	3–1	3–2	2nd out of 4
2013	(Vietnam) SHB Đà Nẵng	Group G	(Malaysia) Kelantan	0–1	0–5	2nd out of 4
2013	(Vietnam) SHB Đà Nẵng	Round of 16	(Indonesia) Semen Padang	1–2		
2014	(Vietnam) Hà Nội T&T	Group F	(Maldives) Maziya	5–1	2–1	1st out of 4
2014	(Vietnam) Hà Nội T&T	Group F	(Indonesia) Arema	2–1	3–1	1st out of 4
2014	(Vietnam) Hà Nội T&T	Group F	(Malaysia) Selangor	1–0	1–3	1st out of 4
2014	(Vietnam) Hà Nội T&T	Round of 16	(Myanmar) Nay Pyi Taw	5–0		
2014	(Vietnam) Hà Nội T&T	Quarter-finals	(Iraq) Erbil	0–1	0–2	0–3
2014	(Vietnam) Vissai Ninh Bình	Group G	(Hong Kong) South China	1–1	3–1	1st out of 4
2014	(Vietnam) Vissai Ninh Bình	Group G	(Myanmar) Yangon United	3–2	4–1	1st out of 4
2014	(Vietnam) Vissai Ninh Bình	Group G	(Malaysia) Kelantan	4–0	3–2	1st out of 4
2014	(Vietnam) Vissai Ninh Bình	Round of 16	(India) Churchill Brothers	4–2		
2014	(Vietnam) Vissai Ninh Bình	Quarter-finals	(Hong Kong) Kitchee	2–4	1–0	3–4
2017	(Vietnam) Hà Nội	Group G	(Philippines) Ceres–Negros	1–1	2–6	2nd out of 4
2017	(Vietnam) Hà Nội	Group G	(Malaysia) Felda United	4–1	1–1	2nd out of 4
2017	(Vietnam) Hà Nội	Group G	(Singapore) Tampines Rovers	4–0	2–1	2nd out of 4
2017	(Vietnam) Than Quảng Ninh	Group H	(Singapore) Home United	4–5	2–3	2nd out of 3
2017	(Vietnam) Than Quảng Ninh	Group H	(Myanmar) Yadanarbon	1–1	3–0	2nd out of 3
2018	(Vietnam) Sông Lam Nghệ An	Group H	(Indonesia) Persija Jakarta	0–0	0–1	2nd out of 4
2018	(Vietnam) Sông Lam Nghệ An	Group H	(Singapore) Tampines Rovers	2–1	2–0	2nd out of 4
2018	(Vietnam) Sông Lam Nghệ An	Group H	(Malaysia) Johor Darul Ta'zim	2–0	2–3	2nd out of 4
2018	(Vietnam) Thanh Hóa	Group G	(Philippines) Global	1–0	3–3	3rd out of 4
2018	(Vietnam) Thanh Hóa	Group G	(Myanmar) Yangon United	3–3	1–2	3rd out of 4
2018	(Vietnam) Thanh Hóa	Group G	(Indonesia) Bali United	0–0	1–3	3rd out of 4
2019	(Vietnam) Becamex Bình Dương	Group G	(Indonesia) Persija Jakarta	3–1	0–0	2nd out of 4
2019	(Vietnam) Becamex Bình Dương	Group G	(Philippines) Ceres–Negros	1–3	1–0	2nd out of 4
2019	(Vietnam) Becamex Bình Dương	Group G	(Myanmar) Shan United	6–0	2–1	2nd out of 4
2019	(Vietnam) Becamex Bình Dương	Zonal semi-finals	(Indonesia) PSM Makassar	1–0	1–2	2–2 (a)
2019	(Vietnam) Becamex Bình Dương	Zonal finals	(Vietnam) Hà Nội	0–1	0–1	0–2
2019	(Vietnam) Hà Nội	Group F	(Cambodia) Nagaworld	10–0	5–1	1st out of 4
2019	(Vietnam) Hà Nội	Group F	(Singapore) Tampines Rovers	2–0	1–1	1st out of 4
2019	(Vietnam) Hà Nội	Group F	(Myanmar) Yangon United	0–1	5–2	1st out of 4
2019	(Vietnam) Hà Nội	Zonal semi-finals	(Philippines) Ceres–Negros	2–1	1–1	3–2
2019	(Vietnam) Hà Nội	Zonal finals	(Vietnam) Becamex Bình Dương	1–0	1–0	2–0
2019	(Vietnam) Hà Nội	Inter-zone play-off semi-finals	(Turkmenistan) Altyn Asyr	3–2	2–2	5–4
2019	(Vietnam) Hà Nội	Inter-zone play-off final	(North Korea) April 25	2–2	0–0	2–2 (a)
2020	(Vietnam) Hồ Chí Minh City	Group F	(Laos) Lao Toyota	Cancelled	2–0	Cancelled
2020	(Vietnam) Hồ Chí Minh City	Group F	(Myanmar) Yangon United	Cancelled	2–2	Cancelled
2020	(Vietnam) Hồ Chí Minh City	Group F	(Singapore) Hougang United	Cancelled	3–2	Cancelled
2020	(Vietnam) Than Quảng Ninh	Group G	(Indonesia) Bali United	Cancelled	1–4	Cancelled
2020	(Vietnam) Than Quảng Ninh	Group G	(Philippines) Ceres–Negros	Cancelled	2–2	Cancelled
2020	(Vietnam) Than Quảng Ninh	Group G	(Cambodia) Svay Rieng	Cancelled	4–1	Cancelled
2021	(Vietnam) Hà Nội	Group G	(Cambodia) Boeung Ket	Cancelled		Cancelled
2021	(Vietnam) Hà Nội	Group G	(Indonesia) Bali United	Cancelled		Cancelled
2021	(Vietnam) Hà Nội	Group G	(Myanmar) Hantharwady United	Cancelled		Cancelled
2021	(Vietnam) Sài Gòn	Group H	(Indonesia) Persipura Jayapura	Cancelled		Cancelled
2021	(Vietnam) Sài Gòn	Group H	(Malaysia) Kedah Darul Aman	Cancelled		Cancelled
2021	(Vietnam) Sài Gòn	Group H	(Singapore) Lion City Sailors	Cancelled		Cancelled
2022	(Vietnam) Viettel	Group I	(Cambodia) Phnom Penh Crown	1–0		1st out of 4
2022	(Vietnam) Viettel	Group I	(Laos) Young Elephants	5–1		1st out of 4
2022	(Vietnam) Viettel	Group I	(Singapore) Hougang United	5–2		1st out of 4
2022	(Vietnam) Viettel	Zonal semi-finals	(Malaysia) Kuala Lumpur City	0–0 (a.e.t.) (5–6 p)		
2023–24	(Vietnam) Hải Phòng	Group H	(Indonesia) PSM Makassar	3–0	1–1	2nd out of 4
2023–24	(Vietnam) Hải Phòng	Group H	(Malaysia) Sabah	3–2	1–4	2nd out of 4
2023–24	(Vietnam) Hải Phòng	Group H	(Singapore) Hougang United	4–0	1–2	2nd out of 4
AFC Champions League Two
2024–25	(Vietnam) Nam Định	Group G	(Hong Kong) Lee Man	3–0	2–0	2nd out of 4
2024–25	(Vietnam) Nam Định	Group G	(Singapore) Tampines Rovers	3–2	3–3	2nd out of 4
2024–25	(Vietnam) Nam Định	Group G	(Thailand) Bangkok United	0–0	2–3	2nd out of 4
2024–25	(Vietnam) Nam Định	Round of 16	(Japan) Sanfrecce Hiroshima	0–3	0–4	0–7
2025–26	(Vietnam) Nam Định	Group F	(Japan) Gamba Osaka	0–1	1–3	3rd out of 4
2025–26	(Vietnam) Nam Định	Group F	(Thailand) Ratchaburi	3–1	0–2	3rd out of 4
2025–26	(Vietnam) Nam Định	Group F	(Hong Kong) Eastern	9–0	1–0	3rd out of 4
2025–26	(Vietnam) Công An Hà Nội	Group E	(China) Beijing Guoan	2–1	2–2	2nd out of 4
2025–26	(Vietnam) Công An Hà Nội	Group E	(Hong Kong) Tai Po	3–0	0–1	2nd out of 4
2025–26	(Vietnam) Công An Hà Nội	Group E	(Australia) Macarthur	1–1	1–2	2nd out of 4
2025–26	(Vietnam) Công An Hà Nội	Round of 16	(Singapore) Tampines Rovers	0–3 (Note: Tampines Rovers were awarded a 0–3 victory by forfeit, after Công An Hà Nội fielded two suspended players. The result was originally a 4–0 win by Công An Hà Nội.)	1–3	1–6
2026–27	(Vietnam) Thể Công–Viettel	Group E	(South Korea) FC Seoul	0–5	0–3	
2026–27	(Vietnam) Thể Công–Viettel	Group E	(Australia) Melbourne Victory	1–1		
2026–27	(Vietnam) Thể Công–Viettel	Group E	(Indonesia) Persib	0–1		

=== Overall statistics in AFC Champions League Two ===
==== By clubs ====
As of 4 November 2026

Overall statistics
#	Team	GP	W	D	L	GF	GA	GD	Pts
1	Hà Nội	35	19	9	7	73	41	+32	66
2	Becamex Bình Dương	28	16	4	8	63	26	+37	52
3	Sông Lam Nghệ An	19	9	2	8	31	27	+4	29
4	SHB Đà Nẵng	16	9	2	5	31	31	+0	29
5	Vissai Ninh Bình	9	7	1	1	25	13	+12	22
6	Nam Định	12	6	2	6	27	22	+5	20
7	Thể Công–Viettel	8	3	2	3	12	13	–1	11
8	Hải Phòng	6	3	1	2	13	9	+4	10
9	Công An Hà Nội	8	2	2	4	10	13	–3	8
10	Xuân Thành Sài Gòn	6	2	2	2	9	12	−3	8
11	Than Quảng Ninh	7	2	2	3	17	16	+1	8
12	Navibank Sài Gòn	6	2	1	3	10	12	−2	7
13	Hồ Chí Minh City	3	2	1	0	7	4	+3	7
14	Thanh Hóa	6	1	3	2	9	11	−2	6
15	Hà Nội ACB	6	2	0	4	6	19	−13	6
16	Hòa Phát Hà Nội	6	0	3	3	7	13	−6	3
Total		181	85	37	61	349	282	+67	292

==== Player records ====
- Most goals in competitions: Nguyễn Văn Quyết, 19
- Most goals in a season: Huỳnh Kesley Alves ( 2009 ), Pape Omar Faye ( 2019 ), each 8

As of 10 August 2022

Most goalscorers record
#	Player	Team	Goals	First goal(s)	Latest goal(s)
1	(Vietnam) Nguyễn Văn Quyết	Hà Nội	19	12 April 2011	25 September 2019
2	(Brazil) (Vietnam) Huỳnh Kesley Alves	Becamex Bình Dương	15	10 March 2009	12 May 2010
3	(Argentina) (Vietnam) Đỗ Merlo	SHB Đà Nẵng	14	24 February 2010	14 May 2013
4	(Senegal) Pape Omar Faye	Thanh Hóa (2), Hà Nội (9)	11	10 February 2018	7 August 2019
5	(Nigeria) Oseni	Hà Nội	9	26 February 2019	15 May 2019
6	(Colombia) Edison Fonseca	Navibank Sài Gòn	8	21 March 2012	8 May 2012
6	(Vietnam) Nguyễn Anh Đức	Becamex Bình Dương	8	21 April 2009	15 May 2019
7	(South Africa) Philani	Becamex Bình Dương	7	7 April 2009	12 May 2010
8	(Argentina) Gonzalo Marronkle	Hà Nội	5	27 April 2011	15 March 2017
8	(Vietnam) Nguyễn Vũ Phong	Becamex Bình Dương	5	19 May 2009	21 April 2010
8	(Vietnam) Đỗ Hùng Dũng	Hà Nội	5	7 March 2017	26 February 2019
8	(Brazil) (Vietnam) Đinh Văn Ta	Vissai Ninh Bình	5	26 February 2014	22 April 2014
8	(Brazil) Pedro Paulo	Viettel	5	24 June 2022	30 June 2022

== Vietnamese clubs in Asian Cup Winners' Cup ==
=== Asian Cup Winners' Cup participations ===
- QR : Qualififying round, QF : Quarter-finals, SF : Semi-finals, RU : Runners-up, W : Winners

Participations
Team	Qualified	92–93	93–94	94–95	95–96	96–97	97–98	98–99	99–00	00–01	01–02
Quảng Nam-Đà Nẵng	2 times	SF		R2							
Hải Quan	2 times						R1	R1			
Cảng Sài Gòn	2 times		R2							R2	
Công An Hồ Chí Minh City	2 times								R2		R2
An Giang	1 time				R1						
Công An Hải Phòng	1 time					R2					

=== Results in Asian Cup Winners' Cup ===
Match won	Match drawn	Match lost

Season	Club	Round	Opponent	Home	Away	Aggregate
Asian Cup Winners' Cup
1992–93	(Vietnam) Quảng Nam-Đà Nẵng	First round	(Singapore) Balestier United	w/o (Note: Balestier United withdrew.)		
1992–93	(Vietnam) Quảng Nam-Đà Nẵng	Second round	(Bangladesh) Mohammedan	1–0	1–1	2–1
1992–93	(Vietnam) Quảng Nam-Đà Nẵng	Semi-finals	(Japan) Nissan	1–1	0–3	1–4
1993–94	(Vietnam) Cảng Sài Gòn	First round	(Malaysia) Sawarak	w/o (Note: Sawarak withdrew.)		
1993–94	(Vietnam) Cảng Sài Gòn	Second round	(Indonesia) Semen Padang	0–1	1–1	1–2
1994–95	(Vietnam) Quảng Nam-Đà Nẵng	Second round	Telephone Org. Thailand	0–3	2–5	2–8
1995–96	(Vietnam) An Giang	First round	(Malaysia) Sabah	1–0	0–3	1–3
1996–97	(Vietnam) Công An Hải Phòng	First round	(Macau) Lam Pak	w/o (Note: Lam Pak withdrew.)		
1996–97	(Vietnam) Công An Hải Phòng	Second round	(Japan) Nagoya Grampus	1–1	0–3	1–4
1997–98	(Vietnam) Hải Quan	First round	(South Korea) Suwon Samsung Bluewings	1–5	0–4	1–9
1998–99	(Vietnam) Hải Quan	First round	(Malaysia) Sawarak	1–2	1–3	2–5
1999–2000	(Vietnam) Công An Hồ Chí Minh City	First round	(Maldives) New Radiant	1–0	3–1	4–1
1999–2000	(Vietnam) Công An Hồ Chí Minh City	Second round	(Hong Kong) South China	1–1	0–3	1–4
2000–01	(Vietnam) Cảng Sài Gòn	First round	Singapore Armed Forces	0–0	2–0	2–0
2000–01	(Vietnam) Cảng Sài Gòn	Second round	(Japan) Shimizu S-Pulse	0–2	0–4	0–6
2001-02	(Vietnam) Công An Hồ Chí Minh City	Second round	(China) Chongqing Lifan	0–1	1–8	1–9

=== Overall statistics in Asian Cup Winners' Cup ===
==== By clubs ====
Overall statistics
#	Team	GP	W	D	L	GF	GA	GD	Pts
1	Công An Hồ Chí Minh City	6	2	1	3	6	14	-8	7
2	Cảng Sài Gòn	6	1	2	3	3	8	-5	5
3	Quảng Nam-Đà Nẵng	6	1	2	3	5	13	-8	5
4	An Giang	2	1	0	1	1	3	-2	3
5	Công An Hải Phòng	2	0	1	1	1	4	-3	1
6	Hải Quan	4	0	0	4	3	14	-9	0
Total		29	8	6	15	19	56	-37	21

== See also ==
- Vietnamese football clubs in Southeast Asian competitions
