= List of legally mononymous people =

This is a list of notable people whose full legal name is (or was) a mononym, either by name change or by being born mononymic (e.g. Burmese, Indonesian, or Japanese royalty). Titles (e.g. Burmese honorifics) do not count against inclusion, because they are not part of the name itself.

This list does not include people who are mononymous only as a stage name, pen name/pseudonym, in certain contexts, or by dint of fame.

Legally mononymous persons
Reason	Source	Mononym	Title(s)	Other name	Born	Died	Description	Ref.
Birth	Japanese royalty	Aiko	Princess Toshi		2001	-	daughter of Emperor Naruhito	
Birth	Japanese royalty	Akihito	Emperor Emeritus		1933	-	former Emperor of Japan (abdicated 2019)	
Birth	Burmese	Ba	Sir U		1887	1963	Burmese president and Supreme Court justice	
Birth	Nepali	Balkrishna	Acharya		c. 1972–1973	-	Nepali billionaire businessman and chairman of the consumer goods company Patanjali Ayurved	
Birth	Arakanese royalty	Bin	Min		1493	1554	King of Arakan in Myanmar from 1531 to 1554	
Birth	Indonesian	Boediono			1943	-	former Vice President of Indonesia	
Name change		Cher		Cheryl Sarkisian	1946	-	American singer and actress	
Name change		Chyna		Joan Marie Laurer	1969	2016	American professional wrestler and actress	
Name change	religious	Dhammaloka	U	Laurence Carroll	1856	1914	Irish-born Buddhist monk, celebrity preacher and editor in British Burma	
Name change	promotion	DotComGuy		Mitch Maddox			American computer specialist; changed to mononym as promotion, later reverted to birth name	
Birth	Japanese royalty	Fumihito	Prince Akishino		1965	-	heir presumptive of Emperor Naruhito	
Name change	religious	Gambira	U	Nyi Nyi Lwin	1979	-	Burmese Buddhist monk leader of All Burma Monks' Alliance during the 2007 Saffron Revolution	
Birth	Indian	Govindjee			1932	-	Indian-American biochemist	
Birth	Japanese royalty	Hirohito	Emperor	Shōwa	1901	1989	former Emperor of Japan	
Birth	Vietnamese	Hổ			1998	-	footballer of Sedang ethnicity	
Name change		Indrani		Indrani Pal-Chaudhuri	1983	-	Indian-British-Canadian director, photographer, girls' empowerment activist and author	
Name change		iOTA		Sean Hape	1968	-	Australian musician and actor	
Birth	Burmese	Kyan	Binnya			1538	senior minister at the court of King Takayutpi of Hanthawaddy	
Birth	Australian aboriginal	Loongkoonan			1910	2018	Australian aboriginal artist	
Birth	Japanese royalty	Mako	former Princess	Mako Komuro	1991	-	Daughter of Crown Prince Fumihito and Crown Princess Kiko, lost royal status and gained surname by marriage to commoner Kei Komuro	
Birth	Indian	Mayawati			1956	-	Indian politician who formerly served as Chief Minister of Uttar Pradesh	
Name change	Japanese royalty by marriage	Michiko	Empress	Michiko Shōda	1934	-	Japanese empress consort	
Birth	Japanese royalty	Naruhito	Emperor		1960	-	Emperor of Japan	
Name change		Nenê		Maybyner Rodney Hilario	1982	-	Brazilian basketball player	
Birth	Burmese	Nu	U or Thakin		1907	1995	leading Burmese statesman and nationalist politician	
Birth	Burmese	Ponnya	U		1812	1867	Burmee dramatist	
Name change	transitioning	Quinn		Rebecca Quinn	1995	-	Canadian soccer player	
Name change	religious	Rajneesh		Chandra Mohan Jain	1931	1990	Indian mystic and founder of the Rajneesh movement	
Name change	religious	Ramdev	Swami	Ram Kisan Yadav	1965	-	Indian ayurvedic and yoga practitioner	
Birth	Pakistani	Riazuddin			1930	2013	Pakistani physicist	
Name change	Burmese	San	Saya	Yar Kyaw	1876	1931	Leader of the 1930–1932 Saya San Rebellion in British Burma	
Birth	Burmese	Saw	U or Galon U		1900	1948	Burmese politician who served as Prime Minister during the colonial era before WW2	
Name change		Shez		Efrat Yerushalmi	1959	-	Israeli poet	
Birth	Indian	Siddaramaiah			1948	-	Indian politician who served a full-chief ministerial term of Karnataka from 2013 to 2018	
Birth	Indonesian	Sjumandjaja			1934	1985	Indonesian director, screenwriter, and actor	
Birth	Indonesian	Sudirman			1916	1950	Indonesian National Hero and the first commander of Indonesian Armed Forces	
Birth	Indonesian	Suharto			1921	2008	former President of Indonesia	
Birth	Indonesian	Sukarno			1901	1970	former President of Indonesia	
Birth	Indonesian	Supriyadi			1923	c. 1945	Indonesian National Hero and the first appointed Minister of Defense of Indonesia	
Birth	Indonesian	Sutomo			1920	1981	Indonesian National Hero and the founder of Indonesian People's Revolutionary Front	
Name change		Teller		Raymond Joseph Teller	1948	-	American magician	
Birth	Burmese	Thant	U		1909	1974	Burmese diplomat and longest-serving Secretary-General of the United Nations	
Birth	Indonesian	Triyatno			1987	-	Indonesian weightlifter and Olympic silver medalist	
Birth	Mon royalty	U	Binnya		1323	1384	King of Hanthawaddy in Myanmar from 1348 to 1384	
Name Change		V		Eve Ensler	1953	-	American playwright	
Name change		Warrior		James Hellwig	1959	2014	American professional wrestler	
Name change		Winter		Rafael Antonio Lozano Jr.	1972	-	American software programmer best known for his goal to visit every company-owned Starbucks location in the world; changed name first to John Winter Smith, then to mononym Winter	
Name change		Ye		Kanye Omari West	1977	-	American rapper, record producer, and fashion designer	
Birth	Indian	Zoramthanga			1944	-	Indian politician and current Chief Minister of Mizoram	

== See also ==
- List of one-word stage names
- Mononym
