= Lê Cao Hoài An =

Vietnamese footballer (born 1993)

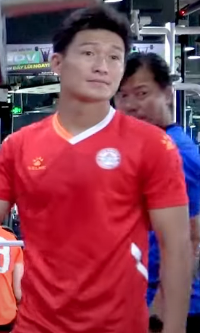
- Hoài An in 2023

Personal information
- Full name: Lê Cao Hoài An
- Date of birth: September 19, 1993 (age 33)
- Place of birth: Nha Trang, Khánh Hòa, Vietnam
- Height: 1.78 m (5 ft 10 in)
- Position: Center-back

Team information
- Current team: Khatoco Khánh Hòa
- Number: 5

Youth career
- 2005–2014: Sanna Khánh Hòa BVN

Senior career*
Years	Team	Apps	(Gls)
2015–2020	Sanna Khánh Hòa BVN	80	(1)
2020	Cần Thơ	7	(1)
2020–2022	Sài Gòn	22	(0)
2022–2024	Hồ Chí Minh City	17	(0)
2024–	Khatoco Khánh Hòa	35	(1)

International career
2013–2015	Vietnam U23	4	(0)
2016–2017	Vietnam	1	(0)
- * Club domestic league appearances and goals as of 6 June 2026

Lê Cao Hoài An (born 19 September 1993) is a Vietnamese professional footballer who plays as a center-back for V.League 2 club Khatoco Khánh Hòa.
