= Youssouf Touré =

French footballer (born 1986)

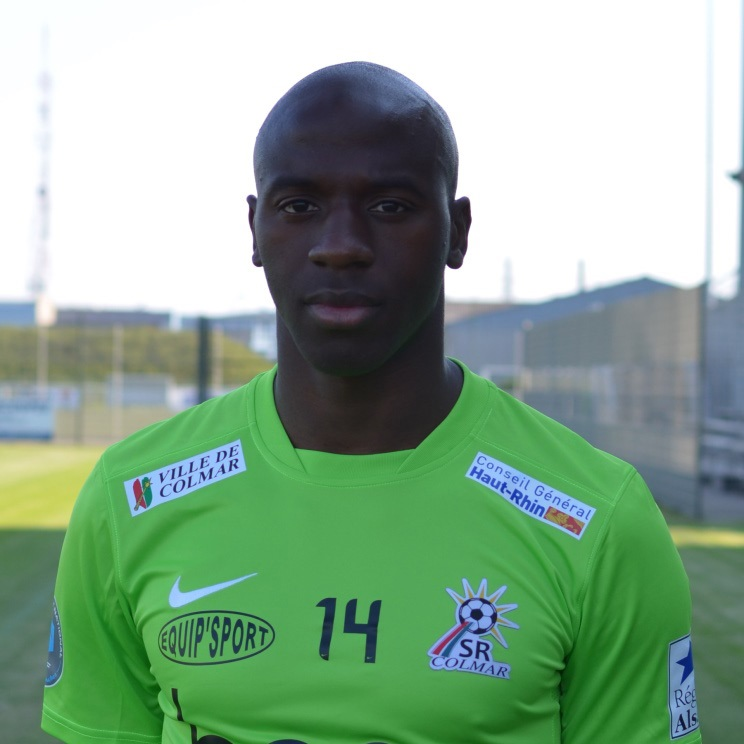

Personal information
- Date of birth: March 14, 1986 (age 40)
- Place of birth: Saint-Denis, France
- Height: 1.85 m (6 ft 1 in)
- Position: Striker

Team information
- Current team: Fréjus Saint-Raphaël
- Number: 19

Youth career
- 2003–2008: Drancy

Senior career*
Years	Team	Apps	(Gls)
2004–2007	Lille	0	(0)
2004–2005	→ Mantes (loan)	26	(2)
2007–2008	Albi	18	(4)
2008	Rodez	13	(0)
2008–2010	Tours	54	(2)
2010–2011	Paris	34	(8)
2011–2012	Colmar	38	(10)
2012–2013	Gazélec Ajaccio	37	(1)
2013–2014	Le Poiré-sur-Vie	33	(3)
2014–2016	Colmar	63	(10)
2016–2017	US Créteil	25	(2)
2017–2019	Sanna Khánh Hòa BVN	61	(23)
2020	Becamex Bình Dương	17	(2)
2021–	Fréjus Saint-Raphaël	5	(1)
- * Club domestic league appearances and goals as of 20 April 2019

Youssouf Touré (born March 14, 1986) is a French professional footballer who currently plays for Becamex Bình Dương.

== Honours ==
Sanna Khánh Hoà

• Mekong Club Championship: runner-up 2017

Individual

- Mekong Club Championship golden boot: 2017
