= 2017 Mekong Club Championship =

Tournament details
- Host country: Vietnam; Cambodia; Laos; Thailand
- Dates: 9 December 2017 – 6 January 2018
- Teams: 4 (from 4 associations)
- Venues: 4 (in 4 host cities)

Final positions
- Champions: (Thailand) Muangthong United
- Runners-up: (Vietnam) Sanna Khánh Hòa

Tournament statistics
- Matches played: 5
- Goals scored: 24 (4.8 per match)
- Attendance: 85,000 (17,000 per match)
- Top scorer(s): (France) Youssouf Touré (Sanna Khánh Hòa) (7 goals)
- Best player: (France) Youssouf Touré

The 2017 Mekong Club Championship was the 4th season of the Mekong Club Championship. The championship was sponsored by Toyota and was played between December 2017 and January 2018 featuring teams from Cambodia, Laos, Thailand and Vietnam. In this edition, the champions of 2017 Myanmar National League was absent from the tournament.

== Qualified teams ==
Team	Federation	Qualification	Participation
Enter in the final
(Thailand) Muangthong United	Thailand	Winners of the 2017 Thai League Cup	1st
Enter in the semi-final
(Laos) Lao Toyota	Laos	Winners of the 2017 Lao Premier League	2nd
Enter in the first round
(Vietnam) Sanna Khánh Hòa	Vietnam	6th place of the 2017 V.League 1	1st
(Cambodia) Beoung Ket Angkor	Cambodia	Winners of the 2017 Cambodian League	3rd

== Venues ==
(Cambodia) Phnom Penh	(Laos) Vientiane	(Thailand) Bangkok	(Vietnam) Hanoi
National Olympic Stadium	New Laos National Stadium	Supachalasai Stadium	Hàng Đẫy Stadium
Capacity: 50,000	Capacity: 25,000	Capacity: 19,793	Capacity: 22,500

== First round ==
- Times listed are local (UTC+7:00)

=== First leg ===
9 December 2017
18:00

Sanna Khánh Hòa (Vietnam)	4–4	Boeung Ket Angkor (Cambodia)
Lê Duy Thanh 8'; Youssouf Touré 42', 55', 83'	Report	Maycon Calijuri 39' (pen.), 48', 88'; Julius Oiboh 82'

Hàng Đẫy Stadium, Hanoi, Vietnam
Attendance: 22,500
Referee: Thoriq Munir Alkatiri (Indonesia)

=== Second leg ===
13 December 2017
19:00

Boeung Ket Angkor (Cambodia)	1–5	Sanna Khánh Hòa (Vietnam)
Sok Sovan 20'	Report	Youssouf Touré 13' (pen.), 77'; Nguyễn Đình Nhơn 19'; Nguyễn Hoàng Quốc Chí 70'; Nguyễn Đoàn Duy Anh 88'

Phnom Penh Olympic Stadium, Phnom Penh, Cambodia
Attendance: 15,000
Referee: Mohd Amirul Izwan Yaacob (Malaysia)

Sanna Khánh Hòa won 9–5 on aggregate.

== Knockout stage ==
=== Bracket ===
Semifinal		Final
		(Vietnam) Sanna Khánh Hòa	1	0	1
(Laos) Lao Toyota	0	(Thailand) Muangthong United	3	4	7
(Vietnam) Sanna Khánh Hòa	2

- Times listed are local (UTC+7:00)

=== Semi-final ===
17 December 2017
18:30

Lao Toyota (Laos)	0–2	(Vietnam) Sanna Khánh Hòa
	Report	Nguyễn Tấn Tài 35'; Youssouf Touré 85'

New Laos National Stadium, Vientiane, Laos
Attendance: 10,000
Referee: Chian Hui Jansen Foo (Singapore)

=== Final ===
==== First leg ====
23 December 2017
18:00

Sanna Khánh Hòa (Vietnam)	1–3	(Thailand) Muangthong United
Youssouf Touré 42'	Report	Adisak Kraisorn 6', 90+3'; Sarach Yooyen 87'

Hàng Đẫy Stadium, Hanoi, Vietnam
Attendance: 22,500
Referee: Nagor Amir Noor Mohamed (Malaysia)

==== Second leg ====
6 January 2018
19:00

Muangthong United (Thailand)	4–0	(Vietnam) Sanna Khánh Hòa
Adisak Kraisorn 54'; Thossawat Limwannasathian 56'; Teerasil Dangda 78'; Siroch Chatthong 89'	Report

Supachalasai Stadium, Bangkok, Thailand
Attendance: 15,000
Referee: Sukhbir Singh (Singapore)

== Winner ==
Mekong Club Championship 2017
Winners

Muangthong United
First Title

== Goalscorers ==
Rank	Player	Club	Goals
1	(France) Youssouf Touré	(Vietnam) Sanna Khánh Hòa	7
2	(Brazil) Maycon Calijuri	(Cambodia) Boeung Ket Angkor	3
2	(Thailand) Adisak Kraisorn	(Thailand) Muangthong United	3
3	(Cambodia) Sok Sovan	(Cambodia) Boeung Ket Angkor	1
3	(Nigeria) Julius Oiboh	(Cambodia) Boeung Ket Angkor	1
3	(Thailand) Sarach Yooyen	(Thailand) Muangthong United	1
3	(Thailand) Siroch Chatthong	(Thailand) Muangthong United	1
3	(Thailand) Teerasil Dangda	(Thailand) Muangthong United	1
3	(Thailand) Thossawat Limwannasathian	(Thailand) Muangthong United	1
3	(Vietnam) Lê Duy Thanh	(Vietnam) Sanna Khánh Hòa	1
3	(Vietnam) Nguyễn Đình Nhơn	(Vietnam) Sanna Khánh Hòa	1
3	(Vietnam) Nguyễn Đoàn Duy Anh	(Vietnam) Sanna Khánh Hòa	1
3	(Vietnam) Nguyễn Hoàng Quốc Chí	(Vietnam) Sanna Khánh Hòa	1
3	(Vietnam) Nguyễn Tấn Tài	(Vietnam) Sanna Khánh Hòa	1
