= Winter (programmer) =

American computer programmer

- Born: Rafael Antonio Lozano Jr. March 20, 1972 (age 54); Chicago, Illinois
- Other name: John Winter Smith
- Occupation: Software programmer
- Website: Starbucks Everywhere

Winter (born Rafael Antonio Lozano Jr., March 20, 1972) is a freelance software programmer and consultant. He was previously known as John Winter Smith, but reported having legally changed his name to the mononym "Winter" in 2006. He is best known for his goal to visit every Starbucks location in the world, visiting as many as 29 locations in one day.

== Background ==
Winter was born in Chicago, Illinois, with his family later moving to Houston, Texas. He attended the University of Texas at Austin, where he graduated with a double major in philosophy and computer science. Winter works as a freelance programmer.

Winter also is a competitive Scrabble player, with over 9,000 tournament games played.

== Starbucks ==
In 1997 Winter began visiting various Starbucks locations, expressing the intent to visit every Starbucks location in the world. To minimize the amount of Starbucks locations, he eliminated any licensed stores to focus solely on those owned by the company. For each location to "count" he would drink "at least one four-ounce sample of caffeinated coffee from each store." He would also take a picture and post it on his website.

Winter has estimated that he has spent over $100,000 on the project, drinking an average of 10 cups of coffee a day and once spending $1,400 on a plane ticket to purchase a cup of coffee from a Starbucks in British Columbia before it closed. As of January 2026, Winter reported having visited over 20,000 global locations, including over 15,000 in the United States and Canada.

== Documentary ==
In 2006 Winter was the focus of the documentary Starbucking. Starbucking was directed by Bill Tangeman and premiered at the 2006 Omaha Film Festival, with the DVD released in April 2007. Tangeman filmed about 40 hours of footage over a one-year period of Winter traveling to various Starbucks locations and interacting with people, including a woman with whom he had been romantically involved. Critical reception for the film was mostly positive, with DVD Talk writing that although the film "doesn't offer much repeat viewing value", it was "highly watchable".
