= Hổ =

Vietnamese footballer (born 1998)

Personal information
- Full name: Hổ
- Date of birth: 2 July 1998 (age 28)
- Place of birth: Kon Tum, Vietnam
- Height: 1.63 m (5 ft 4 in)
- Position: Winger

Team information
- Current team: Khatoco Khánh Hòa
- Number: 18

Youth career
- 2007–2018: Đắk Lắk
- 2018: → Quảng Nam (youth loan)

Senior career*
Years	Team	Apps	(Gls)
2017–2023	Đắk Lắk	65	(9)
2017	→ Kon Tum (loan)	6	(1)
2023–	Khatoco Khánh Hòa	42	(3)
- * Club domestic league appearances and goals as of 12 September 2026

Hổ (lit. 'tiger', born 2 July 1998) is a Vietnamese professional footballer who plays as a winger for V.League 2 club Khatoco Khánh Hòa.

== Career ==
Hổ's football career began in Đắk Lắk's youth system. After impressing in the national under-21 championship, he was promoted to the first team in 2018. In October 2023, he moved up to the top flight with Khánh Hòa.

== Personal life ==
Hổ is an ethnic Sedang from Kon Tum, born to a poor farming family. As per tradition, he has only one name.

== See also ==
- List of legally mononymous people
