= Sakda Fai-in =

Thai footballer (born 1991)

Personal information
- Full name: Sakda Fai-in
- Date of birth: 17 April 1991 (age 35)
- Place of birth: Sakon Nakhon, Thailand
- Height: 1.75 m (5 ft 9 in)
- Position: Centre back

Team information
- Current team: Kanjanapat
- Number: 5

Youth career
- 2008–2009: Osotspa

Senior career*
Years	Team	Apps	(Gls)
2010–2016	Super Power Samut Prakan	31	(0)
2015	→ Sisaket (loan)	6	(0)
2017	Navy	5	(0)
2017	Muangthong United	0	(0)
2017	→ Bangkok (loan)	6	(0)
2018	Trat	19	(0)
2019	Sukhothai	0	(0)
2019–2020	Kasetsart	12	(0)
2020	Rayong	0	(0)
2020–2022	Chainat United	1	(0)
2022	Grakcu Sai Mai United	12	(0)
2022–	Kanjanapat	12	(0)

International career
2009–2010	Thailand U19	8	(0)
2013	Thailand U23	1	(0)
- * Club domestic league appearances and goals as of 19 March 2023

Sakda Fai-in (Thai: ศักดา ฝ่ายอินทร์, born April 17, 1991) is a Thai professional footballer who plays as a defender for Thai League 3 club Kanjanapat.

== Honours ==
Thailand U-23

- BIDC Cup (Cambodia): 2013
