= Trần Trọng Bình =

Vietnamese footballer

Personal information
- Full name: Trần Trọng Bình
- Date of birth: September 24, 1983 (age 43)
- Place of birth: Cam Ranh, Khánh Hòa, Vietnam
- Height: 1.75 m (5 ft 9 in)
- Position: Defender

Youth career
- 1997–2005: Khatoco Khánh Hòa

Senior career*
Years	Team	Apps	(Gls)
2006–2008	Khatoco Khánh Hòa	38	(0)
2009–2010	Hà Nội	14	(0)
2011–2013	Xuân Thành Sài Gòn	29	(0)
2014–2015	Quảng Nam	10	(0)
2015–2020	Sanna Khánh Hòa BVN	83	(1)

International career
2009–2011	Vietnam	9	(0)

Managerial career
- 2023–2026: Khánh Hòa
- * Club domestic league appearances and goals

Trần Trọng Bình (born 24 September 1983) is a retired Vietnamese footballer and football manager who was recently the head coach of V.League 2 club Khánh Hòa. He a member of the Vietnam national football team between 2009 and 2011.
