= Trần Đình Kha =

Vietnamese footballer

Personal information
- Full name: Trần Đình Kha
- Date of birth: March 21, 1994 (age 32)
- Place of birth: Đồng Xuân, Phú Yên, Vietnam
- Height: 1.75 m (5 ft 9 in)
- Position: Forward

Team information
- Current team: Khánh Hòa
- Number: 88

Youth career
- 2006–2014: Sanna Khánh Hòa BVN

Senior career*
Years	Team	Apps	(Gls)
2015–2020	Sanna Khánh Hòa BVN	45	(3)
2021–2022	Topeland Bình Định	12	(0)
2023–	Khánh Hòa	22	(1)

International career
2014–2015	Vietnam U21	1	(0)
- * Club domestic league appearances and goals

Trần Đình Kha (born 21 March 1994) is a Vietnamese footballer who plays as a forward for Khánh Hòa.

== Personal life ==
Đình Kha's young brother Đình Khương is also a professional footballer.
