= Lê Duy Thanh =

Vietnamese footballer (born 1990)

Personal information
- Full name: Lê Duy Thanh
- Date of birth: 19 December 1990 (age 35)
- Place of birth: Phan Rang, Ninh Thuận, Vietnam
- Height: 1.67 m (5 ft 6 in)
- Position: Midfielder

Team information
- Current team: Khánh Hòa
- Number: 8

Youth career
- 2000–2007: Ninh Thuận
- 2007–2009: HAGL – Arsenal JMG Academy

Senior career*
Years	Team	Apps	(Gls)
2010–2014	Hoàng Anh Gia Lai	16	(0)
2012	→ Ninh Thuận (loan)	?	(0)
	Cần Thơ	9	(1)
2016–2024	Khánh Hòa	186	(22)

International career
2011–2012	Vietnam U21	6	(1)
2012–2013	Vietnam U22	3	(0)
- * Club domestic league appearances and goals as of 22 July 2018

Lê Duy Thanh (born 19 December 1990) is a Vietnamese footballer who plays as a midfielder for V.League 1 club Khánh Hòa.

== Honours ==
Khanh Hoa FC

- V.League 2 runner-up: 2022
