= Nguyễn Hoàng Quốc Chí =

Vietnamese footballer

Personal information
- Full name: Nguyễn Hoàng Quốc Chí
- Date of birth: 4 December 1991 (age 34)
- Place of birth: Diên Khánh, Khánh Hòa, Vietnam
- Height: 1.69 m (5 ft 7 in)
- Position: Winger

Team information
- Current team: Bắc Ninh
- Number: 16

Youth career
- 2005–2012: Khatoco Khánh Hòa

Senior career*
Years	Team	Apps	(Gls)
2012–2019	Sanna Khánh Hòa BVN	93+	(25+)
2019–2020	Quảng Nam	27	(3)
2021–2022	Sài Gòn	19	(1)
2023	Bình Phước	2	(0)
2024	Khánh Hòa	7	(1)
2025–	Bắc Ninh	0	(0)
- * Club domestic league appearances and goals as of 31 March 2025

Nguyễn Hoàng Quốc Chí (born 4 December 1991) is a Vietnamese professional footballer who plays as a Winger for Bắc Ninh. Quốc Chí was born in a football family but spent most of his early life in school, only in the last year of high school did he change his mind and decide to pursue football as a career.
