= Mekong Club Championship =

Former ASEAN football competition

Toyota Mekong Club Championship
- Organiser(s): AFF (Southeast Asia)
- Founded: 2014
- Abolished: 2017
- Teams: 5
- Last champions: (Thailand) Muangthong United
- Most championships: (Thailand) Buriram United (2 titles)

The Toyota Mekong Club Championship was an ASEAN club competition for men's association football clubs.

== Clubs ==
Five teams entered as respective domestic league winners from Cambodia, Laos, Myanmar, Thailand and Vietnam.

== History ==
In 2014, Toyota Motor wanted to develop in aspiring football players and football fans in the countries in the Mekong Subregion : Cambodia, Laos, Myanmar and Vietnam, so Toyota debuted the competition called Mekong Club Championship. The first competition was held in 2014 at Bình Dương, Vietnam with four countries participating. Becamex Bình Dương became the first club that won the championship. The second competition was held in 2015, with Thailand joining.

== Trophy ==
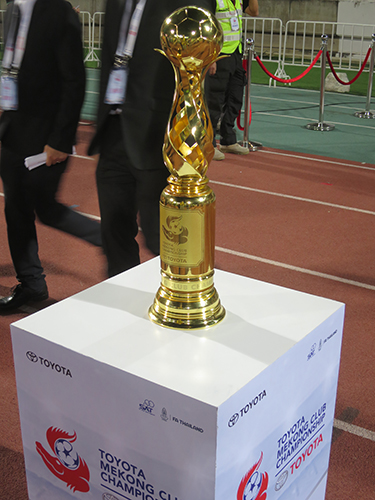
Mekong Club Championship trophy

== Results ==
Year	Final			Third Place Match		
Year	Winner	Score	Runner-up	Third Place	Score	Fourth Place
2014; Details	(Vietnam); Becamex Bình Dương	4–1	(Myanmar); Ayeyawady United	(Cambodia); Phnom Penh Crown	2–0	(Laos); Hoang Anh Attapeu
2015; Details	(Thailand); Buriram United	1–0	(Cambodia); Boeung Ket Angkor	(Vietnam); Becamex Bình Dương		
2016; Details	(Thailand); Buriram United	0–1; 2–0	(Laos); Lanexang United	(Cambodia); Boeung Ket Angkor		
2016; Details	won 2–1 on aggregate			(Cambodia); Boeung Ket Angkor		
2017; Details	(Thailand); Muangthong United	3–1; 4–0	(Vietnam); Sanna Khánh Hòa	(Laos); Lao Toyota		
2017; Details	won 7–1 on aggregate			(Laos); Lao Toyota		

== Awards ==
=== Top scorers ===
Year	Footballer	Club	Goals
2014	(Nigeria) George Bisan	(Cambodia) Phnom Penh Crown	3
2015	(Cambodia) Chan Vathanaka	(Cambodia) Boeung Ket Angkor	5
2016	(Laos) Soukaphone Vongchiengkham	(Laos) Lanexang United	3
2017	(France) Youssouf Touré	(Vietnam) Sanna Khánh Hòa BVN	7

== Statistics ==
=== Performance by club ===
Team	Champions	Runners-up	Third Place
(Thailand) Buriram United	2 (2015, 2016)	–	–
(Vietnam) Becamex Bình Dương	1 (2014)	–	1 (2015)
(Thailand) Muangthong United	1 (2017)	–	–
(Cambodia) Boeung Ket Angkor	–	1 (2015)	1 (2016)
(Myanmar) Ayeyawady United	–	1 (2014)	–
(Laos) Lanexang United	–	1 (2016)	–
(Vietnam) Sanna Khánh Hòa	–	1 (2017)	–
(Cambodia) Phnom Penh Crown	–	–	1 (2014)
(Laos) Lao Toyota	–	–	1 (2017)

=== Participating by club ===
Team	Joined	Years
(Cambodia) Boeung Ket Angkor	3	2015, 2016, 2017
(Vietnam) Becamex Bình Dương	2	2014, 2015
(Thailand) Buriram United	2	2015, 2016
(Laos) Lao Toyota	2	2015, 2017
(Myanmar) Ayeyawady United	1	2014
(Cambodia) Phnom Penh Crown	1	2014
(Laos) Hoang Anh Attapeu	1	2014
(Myanmar) Yangon United	1	2015
(Laos) Lanexang United	1	2016
(Vietnam) SHB Đà Nẵng	1	2016
(Myanmar) Yadanarbon	1	2016
(Thailand) Muangthong United	1	2017
(Vietnam) Sanna Khánh Hòa	1	2017

=== Performance by nation ===
#	Nation	Champions	Runners-up	Third Place
1	Thailand	3	0	0
2	Vietnam	1	1	1
3	Cambodia	0	1	2
4	Laos	0	1	1
5	Myanmar	0	1	0

=== Nation performances ===
Team	2014	2015	2016	2017
Cambodia	3rd	2nd	3rd	4th
Laos	4th	GS	2nd	3rd
Myanmar	2nd	GS	GS	DNP
Thailand	DNP	1st	1st	1st
Vietnam	1st	3rd	GS	2nd

DNP = Did not participate
GS = Group stage

== See also ==
- ASEAN Club Championship
