= Nguyễn Tuấn Mạnh =

Vietnamese footballer

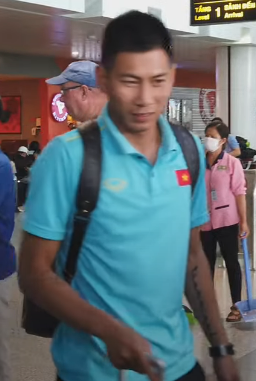
- Tuấn Mạnh in 2019

Personal information
- Full name: Nguyễn Tuấn Mạnh
- Date of birth: 31 July 1990 (age 36)
- Place of birth: Nghi Sơn, Thanh Hóa, Vietnam
- Height: 1.81 m (5 ft 11 in)
- Position: Goalkeeper

Team information
- Current team: Khánh Hòa
- Number: 26

Youth career
- 2006–2009: HAGL – Arsenal JMG Academy

Senior career*
Years	Team	Apps	(Gls)
2010–2015	Hoàng Anh Gia Lai	26	(0)
2015–2020	Sanna Khánh Hòa BVN	125	(0)
2020–2022	SHB Đà Nẵng	32	(0)
2023	Becamex Bình Dương	1	(0)
2023–	Khánh Hòa	2	(0)

International career^{‡}
2010–2011	Vietnam U21	3	(0)
2011–2012	Vietnam U23	8	(0)
2017–2019	Vietnam	4	(0)
- * Club domestic league appearances and goals as of 7 October 2022 ‡ National team caps and goals as of 19 November 2019

Nguyễn Tuấn Mạnh (born 31 July 1990) is a Vietnamese professional footballer who plays as a goalkeeper for V.League 2 club Khánh Hòa. He appeared four times for the Vietnam national team between 2017 and 2019.

== Early life ==
Nguyễn Tuấn Mạnh was born in Tinh Gia district, Thanh Hoa in a family with 2 sons. His father - Nguyen Trong Chu was a famous volleyball player. In 1999, Nguyễn Tuấn Mạnh and his brother followed his mother to Gia Lai to live with his father.

== Early career ==
In 2005, Nguyễn Tuấn Mạnh was selected to the U-15 team of Hoang Anh Gia Lai.

In 2009, he received a silver medal after U-19 Hoang Anh Gia Lai losing to U-19 Viettel FC in the final match of U-19 national tournament in 2009.

In 2010, Nguyễn Tuấn Mạnh and U-21 Hoang Anh Gia Lai won the bronze medal in U-21 national tournament.

== Club career ==
In 2010, after his good performances with the U-21 side, Tuấn Mạnh was promoted to the Hoang Anh Gia Lai first team to play in the V.League 1. Before that, he already had made his debut for Hoang Anh Gia Lai against SHB Da Nang in 2009. In the 2011 season, Nguyễn Tuấn Mạnh played total 13 matches for Hoang Anh Gia Lai.

In 2014, Tuấn Mạnh joined Sanna Khanh Hoa.

In 2020, Tuấn Mạnh joined SHB Da Nang.

== International career ==
After his performance in the 2011 V-League, Nguyễn Tuấn Mạnh was summoned by coach Phan Thanh Hung to the Vietnamese Olympic teams to participate in the 2012 Olympics qualifiers.

On September 20, 2011, Nguyễn Tuấn Mạnh continued to participate in the U-23 Vietnam squad to participate in the Ho Chi Minh City Football Cup, the team ranked in 3rd place.

In preparation for the 26th SEA Games in Indonesia, Nguyễn Tuấn Mạnh joined U-23 Vietnam and ranked 4th in the tournament.

He also played against Qatar in the second qualification round of the 2014 World Cup.

== Honours ==
Hoang Anh Gia Lai

- Vietnamese National U-19 Football Championship: 2009
- International U-21 Thanh Niên Newspaper Cup third place: 2010

Vietnam

- AFF Championship: 2018
