= Khatoco Khanh Hoa FC =

Vietnamese football club

Khatoco Khánh Hòa
- Full name: Khatoco Khánh Hòa Football Club
- Nickname: Chim Yến Xanh (The Blue Swift/Swallows)
- Short name: KHFC
- Founded: 2013; 13 years ago
- Ground: 19 August Nha Trang Stadium
- Capacity: 25,000
- Owner: Khanh Hoa Sport JSC
- Chairman: Nguyễn Thanh Hải
- Head coach: Võ Đình Tân
- League: V.League 2
- 2025–26: V.League 2, 8th of 12
- Website: Official website
Home colours	Away colours

Khatoco Khanh Hoa Football Club (Vietnamese: Câu lạc bộ Bóng đá Khatoco Khánh Hòa) simply known as Khánh Hòa, is a professional football club based in Nha Trang, Khánh Hòa Province, Vietnam. They currently compete in the V.League 2, the second highest division football league in Vietnam. The team plays its home games at the 19 August Nha Trang Stadium.

== History ==
=== Former Khanh Hòa team ===
The predecessor of the team was Phu Khanh football team, established in 1976. Team participated in Vietnam Football Championship since the original 1980 season. In 1989, the province Phu Khanh split into two provinces Phu Yen and Khanh Hoa. As the result, the team was transferred to Khanh Hoa province to manage under the name. Khanh Hoa football team. After several years playing in professional level, at the end of the 2012 V-League season, due to financial difficulties, the club sold their 2013 V.League spot to Vicem Haiphong, along with many players of the first team. However, due to lack of funding, the team also withdrew from the 2013 V.League 2 and officially dissolved.

=== Re-establishment ===
In 2012, after the dissolution of Khatoco Khanh Hoa, the youth team of this club was founded and named Sanna Khanh Hoa Bien Vietnam. In 2013, Sanna Khanh Hoa BVN competed in the National Second Division Football League and promoted to the V.League 2 in 2014. In the 2014 season, Sanna Khanh Hoa BVN finished as V.League 2 runners up and gained their promotion to V.League 1, only two years after the club's establishment.

In October 2024, Khatoco became the new sponsor of the club and change the club name to Khatoco Khánh Hòa, similar to the 2012 dissolved team.

== Stadium ==
The team's home ground is the 19th August Stadium, also known as the Nha Trang Stadium, a football stadium located on Yersin Street, Van Thanh Ward, Nha Trang City, Khanh Hoa Province, with a capacity of about 18,000 spectators.

== Kit suppliers and shirt sponsors ==
Period	Kit manufacturer	Shirt sponsor
2020	(Vietnam) VNA Sport	Yen Sao Khanh Hoa
2021–present	(Vietnam) Kamito	KN Cam Ranh Yen Sao Khanh Hoa

== Current squad ==
As of 5 September 2026

Note: Flags indicate national team as defined under FIFA eligibility rules; some limited exceptions apply. Players may hold more than one non-FIFA nationality.

No.	Pos.	Nation	Player
2	DF	VIE	Bùi Nguyễn Tấn Kiệt
3	DF	VIE	Đoàn Công Thành
7	MF	DEN	Truong Quoc Minh
8	FW	VIE	Trần Văn Tùng
9	FW	VIE	Lê Trương Quốc Thắng
10	FW	UKR	Oleksandr Kurakin
11	MF	VIE	Phạm Trùm Tỉnh
13	DF	VIE	Nguyễn Minh Lợi
17	GK	VIE	Nguyễn Văn Sơn
18	FW	VIE	Hổ
16	FW	VIE	Trần Khánh Dũng
19	FW	VIE	Dương Đoàn Công Hậu
21	MF	VIE	Nguyễn Hoàng Thiện
22	MF	VIE	Nguyễn Thành Tây

No.	Pos.	Nation	Player
23	DF	VIE	Đỗ Trường Trân
24	DF	VIE	Trần Vương
25	DF	CZE	Martin Hoang
27	DF	VIE	Trần Khánh Dũng
28	GK	VIE	Lâm Lê Phước Tiến Dũng (on loan from SHB Đà Nẵng)
29	MF	VIE	Trần Hữu Đăng
33	FW	VIE	Nguyễn Hữu Khôi
35	DF	VIE	Võ Ngọc Hải
39	MF	VIE	Ngô Hoàng Anh
43	DF	VIE	Trịnh Văn Quang
52	DF	VIE	Huỳnh Nhật Tân
71	MF	VIE	Huỳnh Thanh Tuấn
88	MF	VIE	Nguyễn Đình Mạnh
93	GK	VIE	Võ Ngọc Cường

== Coaching staff ==
Position	Name
Head coach	(Vietnam) Võ Đình Tân
Assistant coach	(Vietnam) Nguyễn Văn Đồng (Vietnam) Nguyễn Tấn Điền
Goalkeeper coach	(Vietnam) Nguyễn Tuấn Mạnh
Logistics	(Vietnam) Trần Văn Vũ
Doctor	(Vietnam) Nguyễn Hoàng Vũ

== Regional record ==
Season	Competition	Round	Club	Home	Away	Aggregate
2017	Mekong Club Championship	First round	(Cambodia) Boeung Ket Angkor	4–4	5–1	9–5
2017	Mekong Club Championship	Semi-final	(Laos) Lao Toyota	2–0		
2017	Mekong Club Championship	Final	(Thailand) Muangthong United	1–3	0–4	1–7

== Season by season domestic record ==
Season	Pld	Won	Draw	Lost	GF	GA	GD	PTS	Final position	Notes
2013 Second League									1st	Promoted to 2014 V.League 2
2014 V.League 2	14	6	5	3	20	15	+5	23	2nd	Promoted to 2015 V.League 1
2015 V.League 1	26	12	6	8	35	35	0	42	5th	
2016 V.League 1	26	10	6	10	34	30	+4	36	8th	
2017 V.League 1	26	11	8	7	38	37	+1	41	6th	Qualified for 2017 Mekong Club Championship
2018 V.League 1	26	11	10	5	33	27	+6	43	3rd	
2019 V.League 1	26	6	7	13	31	45	-14	25	14th	Relegated to 2020 V.League 2
2020 V.League 2	16	9	3	4	23	11	+12	30	3rd	
2022 V.League 2	22	11	9	2	30	16	+14	42	2nd	Promoted to 2023 V.League 1
2023–24 V.League 1	26	2	5	19	19	52	−33	11	14th	Relegated to 2024–25 V.League 2
2024–25 V.League 2	20	5	6	9	16	25	−9	21	5th	

== Head coach history ==
Head coaches by Years (2013–present)

Name	Nat	Period	Honours
Võ Đình Tân	(Vietnam)	2013–2023	
Trần Thiện Hảo (interim)	(Vietnam)	2023	
Trần Trọng Bình	(Vietnam)	2023–2026	
Võ Đình Tân	(Vietnam)	2026–	

== Honours ==
=== National competitions ===
League

- V.League 2
  - Runners-up: 2014, 2022
  - Third place: 2020
- Second Division
  - Winners: 2004, 2013

=== Other competitions ===
- Mekong Club Championship
  - Runners-up: 2017
- Festival Hoa Da Lat Cup
  - Champions: 2022
