= 2026–27 Thể Công–Viettel FC season =

20th season in existence of Thể Công–Viettel FC

Thể Công–Viettel
2026–27 season
- President: Đỗ Mạnh Dũng
- Head coach: Velizar Popov (from 1 July to 31 October); Guilherme Almeida (from 1 November)
- Stadium: Mỹ Đình; Hàng Đẫy (First half)
- V.League 1: 12th
- Vietnamese Cup: Round of 16
- AFC Champions League Two: Group stage
- Top goalscorer: League: Ribamar; Colonna; Khuất Văn Khang (1 each); All: Ribamar (2)
- Highest home attendance: 8,200 v Thanh Hoa; 8 November 2026 (V.League 1)
- Lowest home attendance: 2,500 v Hong Linh Ha Tinh; 8 October 2026 (V.League 1)
- Average home league attendance: 6,140
- Biggest win: 2–0 v Dong Nai City (Away); 4 September 2026 (V.League 1)
- Biggest defeat: 0–5 v FC Seoul (Home); 28 October 2026 (AFC Champions League Two)
Home colours	Away colours
- All statistics correct as of 20 November 2026.

The 2026–27 season is the 37th season in the history of Thể Công–Viettel since their establishment in 1954, and the club's 8th consecutive season in the top flight of Vietnamese football. In addition to the domestic league, the club is participating in this season's editions of the Vietnamese Cup, AFC Champions League Two.

== Players ==
As of 25 August 2026

Note: Flags indicate national team as defined under FIFA eligibility rules; some limited exceptions apply. Players may hold more than one non-FIFA nationality.

No.	Pos.	Nation	Player
1	GK	AUS	Lawrence Caruso
2	DF	USA	Kyle Colonna
3	DF	VIE	Nguyễn Thanh Bình
4	DF	VIE	Bùi Tiến Dũng (captain)
5	MF	BRA	André Luiz
6	FW	VIE	Trần Danh Trung
7	MF	BRA	Wesley Natã
8	MF	VIE	Nguyễn Hữu Thắng
9	FW	BRA	Ribamar
10	FW	BRA	Hernandes Rodrigues
11	MF	VIE	Khuất Văn Khang
12	DF	VIE	Phan Tuấn Tài
13	FW	JAM	Rimario Gordon
14	MF	BRA	Paulinho Curuá
15	DF	BRA	Lucas Alves
16	DF	VIE	Phạm Trung Hiếu
17	MF	VIE	Nguyễn Đức Hoàng Minh
18	DF	VIE	Đinh Viết Tú

No.	Pos.	Nation	Player
19	MF	VIE	Đinh Xuân Tiến
20	DF	VIE	Đào Văn Nam
22	MF	VIE	Nguyễn Hoàng Khanh
23	FW	VIE	Nhâm Mạnh Dũng
28	GK	VIE	Nguyễn Văn Việt (on loan from Sông Lam Nghệ An)
33	GK	VIE	Phí Minh Long
34	MF	VIE	Doãn Ngọc Tân
66	MF	POL	Damian Vu Thanh
83	MF	VIE	Hoàng Văn Thái
86	MF	VIE	Nguyễn Hữu Nam
88	MF	VIE	Nguyễn Văn Tú
89	MF	VIE	Lê Quốc Nhật Nam
95	FW	BRA	Júnior Brandão
97	MF	VIE	Triệu Việt Hưng

=== Other players under contract ===
Note: Flags indicate national team as defined under FIFA eligibility rules; some limited exceptions apply. Players may hold more than one non-FIFA nationality.

No.	Pos.	Nation	Player
—	GK	VIE	Trần Đức Duy
—	MF	VIE	Đỗ Văn Chí
—	MF	VIE	Nguyễn Đình Đức

No.	Pos.	Nation	Player
—	FW	VIE	Nguyễn Hữu Tiệp
—	FW	VIE	Vũ Bá Hải Dương

== Transfers ==
=== In ===
Date	Pos.	Player	From	Fee	Ref.
23 July 2026	MF	(Vietnam) Doãn Ngọc Tân	(Vietnam) Đông Á Thanh Hóa	Free	
23 July 2026	DF	(Vietnam) Phạm Trung Hiếu	(Vietnam) Hải Phòng	Free	
23 July 2026	DF	(Vietnam) Triệu Việt Hưng	(Vietnam) Hải Phòng	Free	
6 August 2026	FW	(Brazil) Rimario Gordon	(Vietnam) Đông Á Thanh Hóa	Free	
10 August 2026	MF	(Brazil) Lucas Alves	(Vietnam) Thep Xanh Nam Dinh	Free	
10 August 2026	GK	(Australia) Lawrence Caruso	(Australia) Green Gully	Free	
21 August 2026	FW	(Brazil) Júnior Brandão	(Indonesia) Madura United	Free	
21 August 2026	GK	(Vietnam) Phí Minh Long	(Vietnam) PVF-CAND	Free	

=== Out ===
Date	Pos.	Player	To	Fee	Ref.
30 June 2026	MF	(Vietnam) Nguyễn Mạnh Tùng		Free	
30 June 2026	GK	(Vietnam) Phạm Văn Phong		Free	
30 June 2026	MF	(Vietnam) Bùi Văn Đức		Free	
30 June 2026	GK	(Vietnam) Ngô Xuân Sơn	(Vietnam) Thái Nguyên	Free	
30 June 2026	DF	(Vietnam) Vũ Văn Quyết		Free	
25 July 2026	FW	(Brazil) Lucão do Break	TBC	Free	
31 July 2026	FW	(Brazil) Pedro Henrique	TBC	Free	
17 August 2026	MF	(Vietnam) Đặng Văn Trâm	TBC	Free	

== Pre-season and friendlies ==
Win Draw Loss Fixtures

15 August 2026 Friendly	Thep Xanh Nam Dinh	0–2	The Cong–Viettel	Hanoi
--:-- UTC+7		Report	?; ?	Stadium: Thể Công–Viettel training ground

== Competitions ==
=== Overall record ===
Competition	First match	Last match	Starting round	Record							
Competition	First match	Last match	Starting round	Pld	W	D	L	GF	GA	GD	Win %
V.League 1	4 September 2026	22 May 2027	Round 1	8	1	3	4	7	11	−4	12.50
Vietnamese Cup	3 January 2027		Round of 16	0	0	0	0	0	0	+0	—
AFC Champions League Two	16 September 2026		Group stage	4	0	1	3	1	10	−9	0.00
Total				12	1	4	7	8	21	−13	8.33

Last updated: 8 November 2026
Source: Soccerway

=== V.League 1 ===
==== League table ====
Pos	Team	Pld	W	D	L	GF	GA	GD	Pts	Qualification or relegation
10	SHB Da Nang	8	3	0	5	8	13	−5	9	
11	Bac Ninh	7	2	2	3	5	6	−1	8	
12	The Cong-Viettel	8	1	3	4	7	11	−4	6	
13	Hoang Anh Gia Lai	8	2	0	6	10	17	−7	6	Relegation to V.League 2
14	Dong Nai City	8	1	1	6	2	14	−12	4	Relegation to V.League 2

Updated to match(es) played on 21 November 2026. Source: VPF
Rules for classification: 1) Points; 2) Head-to-head points; 3) Head-to-head goal difference; 4) Head-to-head goals scored; 5) Goal difference; 6) Goals scored; 7) Away goals scored; 8) Disciplinary points.

==== Results summary ====
Overall								Home						Away					
Pld	W	D	L	GF	GA	GD	Pts	W	D	L	GF	GA	GD	W	D	L	GF	GA	GD
8	1	3	4	7	11	−4	6	0	3	2	4	7	−3	1	0	2	3	4	−1

Last updated: 20 November 2026.
Source: VPF

==== Results by round ====
Round	1	2	3	4	5	6	7	8	9	10	11	12	13	14	15	16	17	18	19	20	21	22	23	24	25	26
Ground	A	H	H	A	H	A	H	H	A	A	H	H	A	H	A	A	H	H	A	A	H	A	H	A	A	H
Result	W	L	L	L	D	L	D	D																		
Position	4	7	9	11	12	12	13	12																		

Updated to match(es) played on 20 November 2026. Source: VPF
A = Away; H = Home; W = Win; D = Draw; L = Loss

==== Matches ====
The league fixtures were drawn and released on 6 August 2026.

Win Draw Loss Fixtures

4 September 2026 1	Dong Nai City	0–2	The Cong-Viettel	Đồng Nai
18:00	Jović (red card) 76'	Report	Ribamar 62'; Trần Danh Trung (yellow card) 79'; Colonna (yellow card) 87', (goal) 90+1'; Nhâm Mạnh Dũng (red card) 90+5'	Stadium: Bình Phước Stadium; Attendance: 10,000; Referee: Đỗ Khánh Nam

10 September 2026 2	The Cong-Viettel	0–1	Cong An Hanoi	Hanoi
19:15	Triệu Việt Hưng (yellow card) 71'; Nguyễn Đức Hoàng Minh (yellow card) 86'	Report	Nguyễn Đình Bắc (yellow card) 30'; Kevin Pham Ba (yellow card) 45+1'; Đoàn Văn Hậu (red card) 70'; Mauk 90+4', (yellow card) 90+4'	Stadium: Hàng Đẫy Stadium; Attendance: 8,000; Referee: Ngô Duy Lân

8 October 2026 3	The Cong-Viettel	1–3	Hong Linh Ha Tinh	Hanoi
19:15	Khuất Văn Khang 33'; Nguyễn Hữu Thắng (yellow card) 85'	Report	Antônio 16'; Passira 60', 63'; Bùi Văn Đức (yellow card) 69'; Helerson (yellow card) 70'; Bùi Duy Thường (yellow card) 73'; Võ Quốc Dân (yellow card) 89' (yellow-red card) 90+3'	Stadium: Hàng Đẫy Stadium; Attendance: 2,500; Referee: Mai Xuân Hùng

19 October 2026 4	Cong An Ho Chi Minh City	1–0	The Cong-Viettel	Ho Chi Minh City
18:00	Gomes (yellow card) 35'; Olaha 68'; Nguyễn Đức Phú (red card) 81'	Report	Nguyễn Đức Hoàng Minh (yellow card) 34'; Phan Tuấn Tài (yellow card) 45'	Stadium: Bình Dương Stadium; Attendance: 4,000; Referee: Trần Ngọc Nhớ

23 October 2026 5	The Cong-Viettel	2–2	Bac Ninh	Hanoi
19:15	Nhâm Mạnh Dũng (yellow card) 34'; Ribamar 50'; Hernandes 90+1' (pen.)	Report	Mai Xuân Quyết (yellow card) 7' (yellow-red card) 90'; Nguyễn Văn Đạt (yellow card) 39'; Brenner (yellow card) 54', (goal) 90+10'; Ngân Văn Đại (yellow card) 64', (goal) 74'	Stadium: Hàng Đẫy Stadium; Attendance: 7,000; Referee: Nguyễn Viết Duẩn

31 October 2026 6	Thep Xanh Nam Dinh	3–1	The Cong-Viettel	Ninh Bình
18:00	Trần Ngọc Sơn 55', 90+6'; Crawford (yellow card) 60'; César 76'	Report	Natã 5'; Colonna (yellow card) 37'; Nguyễn Đức Hoàng Minh (yellow card) 44'; Paulinho (red card) 51'	Stadium: Thiên Trường Stadium; Attendance: 12,000; Referee: Lê Vũ Linh

8 November 2026 7	The Cong-Viettel	1–1	Thanh Hoa	Hanoi
19:15	Đào Văn Nam (yellow card) 73'; Doãn Ngọc Tân 80'	Report	Guindo 8'; Nguyễn Bá Tiến (red card) 34'	Stadium: Hàng Đẫy Stadium; Attendance: 8,200; Referee: Bùi Trung Dũng

20 November 2026 8	The Cong-Viettel	0–0	Song Lam Nghe An	Hanoi
19:15	Doãn Ngọc Tân (yellow card) 30'	Report	Lê Đình Long Vũ (yellow card) 25'; Đặng Văn Lắm (yellow card) 32'; Nguyễn Xuân Bình (yellow card) 68'	Stadium: Hàng Đẫy Stadium; Attendance: 5,000; Referee: Mai Xuân Hùng

29 November 2026 9	Haiphong	v	The Cong-Viettel	Haiphong
18:00		Report		Stadium: Lạch Tray Stadium

7 December 2026 10	SHB Da Nang	v	The Cong-Viettel	Đà Nẵng
19:15		Report		Stadium: Chi Lăng Stadium

11 December 2026 11	The Cong-Viettel	v	Hanoi FC	Hanoi
19:15		Report		Stadium: Hàng Đẫy Stadium

18 December 2026 12	The Cong-Viettel	v	Hoang Anh Gia Lai	Hanoi
19:15		Report		Stadium: Hàng Đẫy Stadium

22 December 2026 13	Ninh Binh	v	The Cong-Viettel	Ninh Bình
18:00		Report		Stadium: Ninh Bình Stadium

February 2027 14	The Cong-Viettel	v	Cong An Ho Chi Minh City	Hanoi
18:00		Report		Stadium: Mỹ Đình Stadium

February 2027 15	Hong Linh Ha Tinh	v	The Cong-Viettel	Hà Tĩnh
18:00		Report		Stadium: Hà Tĩnh Stadium

March 2027 16	Hoang Anh Gia Lai	v	The Cong-Viettel	Gia Lai
17:00		Report		Stadium: Pleiku Stadium

March 2027 17	The Cong-Viettel	v	Ninh Binh	Hanoi
19:15		Report		Stadium: Mỹ Đình Stadium

March 2027 18	The Cong-Viettel	v	Haiphong	Hanoi
19:15		Report		Stadium: Mỹ Đình Stadium

April 2027 19	Song Lam Nghe An	v	The Cong-Viettel	Nghệ An
18:00		Report		Stadium: Vinh Stadium

April 2027 20	Thanh Hoa	v	The Cong-Viettel	Thanh Hóa
17:00		Report		Stadium: Thanh Hóa Stadium

April 2027 21	The Cong-Viettel	v	Thep Xanh Nam Dinh	Hanoi
19:15		Report		Stadium: Mỹ Đình Stadium

April 2027 22	Bac Ninh	v	The Cong-Viettel	Bắc Ninh
18:00		Report		Stadium: Việt Yên Stadium

May 2027 23	The Cong-Viettel	v	SHB Da Nang	Hanoi
19:15		Report		Stadium: Mỹ Đình Stadium

May 2027 24	Hanoi FC	v	The Cong-Viettel	Hanoi
19:15		Report		Stadium: Hàng Đẫy Stadium

May 2027 25	Cong An Hanoi FC	v	The Cong-Viettel	Hanoi
19:15		Report		Stadium: Hàng Đẫy Stadium

22 May 2027 26	The Cong-Viettel	v	Dong Nai City	Hanoi
19:15		Report		Stadium: Mỹ Đình Stadium

=== Vietnamese Cup ===
The both qualifying round and round of 16 draw were held on 6 August 2026.

3 January 2027 Round of 16	The Cong–Viettel	v	Ho Chi Minh City FC	Hanoi
19:15		Report		Stadium: Mỹ Đình Stadium

=== AFC Champions League Two ===
==== Group stage ====
The draw for the group stage took place in Kuala Lumpur, Malaysia on 18 August 2026 at 14:00 MST.

===== Group E table =====
Pos	Team	Pld	W	D	L	GF	GA	GD	Pts	Qualification
1	(Indonesia) Persib (A)	4	4	0	0	6	1	+5	12	Advance to round of 16
2	(South Korea) FC Seoul	4	2	0	2	8	4	+4	6	Advance to round of 16
3	(Australia) Melbourne Victory	4	1	1	2	5	5	0	4	
4	(Vietnam) Thể Công–Viettel	4	0	1	3	1	10	−9	1	

Updated to match(es) played on 4 November 2026. Source: ACL2
Rules for classification: Tiebreakers
(A) Advance to a further round

Round	1	2	3	4	5	6
Ground	H	A	H	A	A	H
Result	D	L	L	L		
Position	3	3	4	4		
Points	1	1	1	1		

Updated to match(es) played on 4 November 2026. Source: ACL2
A = Away; H = Home; W = Win; D = Draw; L = Loss

===== Group stage matches =====
Win Draw Loss Fixtures

16 September 2026 1	Thể Công–Viettel (Vietnam)	1–1	(Australia) Melbourne Victory	Hanoi, Vietnam
19:15 UTC+7	Ribamar 62'; Colonna (yellow card) 67'	Report	Inserra (yellow card) 10'; Santos 58'	Stadium: Hàng Đẫy Stadium; Attendance: 4,800; Referee: Ismaeel Habib Ali (Bahrain)

14 October 2026 2	Persib (Indonesia)	1–0	(Vietnam) Thể Công–Viettel	West Java, Indonesia
19:15 UTC+7	Haye (yellow card) 44'; Peralta 45' (pen.); Klok (yellow card) 59' (yellow-red card) 74'	Report	Rimario (yellow card) 44'; Curuá (yellow card) 48' (yellow-red card) 64'; Nguyễn Văn Tú (yellow card) 55'	Stadium: Gelora Bandung Lautan Api Stadium; Attendance: 12,739; Referee: Ahmed Eisa Darwish (United Arab Emirates)

28 October 2026 3	Thể Công–Viettel (Vietnam)	0–5	(South Korea) FC Seoul	Hanoi, Vietnam
19:15 UTC+7	Nguyễn Đức Hoàng Minh (yellow card) 82'	Report	Moon Seon-min 8'; Yazan (yellow card) 18' (yellow-red card) 66'; Oliveira 21'; Hwang Do-yun 29'; Cho Young-wook 34'; Acevedo 54'	Stadium: Hàng Đẫy Stadium; Attendance: 6,200; Referee: Yoshimi Yamashita (Japan)

4 November 2026 4	FC Seoul (South Korea)	3–0	(Vietnam) Thể Công–Viettel	Seoul, South Korea
19:00 UTC+9	Moon Seon-min 68'; Anderson 79'; Lucão 90'	Report	Nguyễn Hoàng Khanh (yellow card) 73'	Stadium: Seoul World Cup Stadium; Attendance: 3,504; Referee: Ammar Abo Alo (Syria)

25 November 2026 5	Melbourne Victory (Australia)	v	(Vietnam) Thể Công–Viettel	Melbourne, Australia
18:45 UTC+11		Report		Stadium: Melbourne Rectangular Stadium

2 December 2026 6	Thể Công–Viettel (Vietnam)	v	(Indonesia) Persib	Hanoi, Vietnam
17:00 UTC+7		Report		Stadium: Hàng Đẫy Stadium

== Statistics ==
=== Overall ===
As of 20 November 2026

Players with no appearances are not included on the list Appearances numbers are for appearances in competitive games only, including substitute appearances.
Red card numbers denote: numbers in parentheses represent red cards overturned for wrongful dismissal.
Source for all stats:

No.	Player	Pos.	V.League 1				Vietnamese Cup				AFC Champions League Two				Total			
No.	Player	Pos.	👕	Goal	Yellow card	Red card	👕	Goal	Yellow card	Red card	👕	Goal	Yellow card	Red card	👕	Goal	Yellow card	Red card
1	(Australia) Lawrence Caruso	GK									1				1			
2	(United States) Kyle Colonna	DF	6	1	2						4		1		10	1	2	
5	(Brazil) André Luiz	MF	5								2				7			
6	(Vietnam) Trần Danh Trung	FW	4		1						1				5		1	
7	(Brazil) Wesley Natã	MF	4	1							2				6	1		
8	(Vietnam) Nguyễn Hữu Thắng	MF	5		1										5		1	
9	(Brazil) Ribamar	FW	5	2							4	1			9	3		
10	(Brazil) Hernandes Rodrigues	FW	3	1							2				5	1		
11	(Vietnam) Khuất Văn Khang	MF	8								4				12			
12	(Vietnam) Phan Tuấn Tài	DF	6	1	1						2				8	1	1	
13	(Jamaica) Rimario Gordon	FW									3		1		3		1	
14	(Brazil) Paulinho Curuá	MF	5			1					2		1	1	7		1	2
15	(Brazil) Lucas Alves	DF	4								2				6			
16	(Vietnam) Phạm Trung Hiếu	FW	5								3				8			
17	(Vietnam) Nguyễn Đức Hoàng Minh	MF	6		3						2		1		8		4	
18	(Vietnam) Đinh Viết Tú	DF	6								4				10			
19	(Vietnam) Đinh Xuân Tiến	MF	3												3			
20	(Vietnam) Đào Văn Nam	DF	3		1						1				4		1	
22	(Vietnam) Nguyễn Hoàng Khanh	MF	2								1		1		3		1	
23	(Vietnam) Nhâm Mạnh Dũng	FW	4		1	1									5		1	1
28	(Vietnam) Nguyễn Văn Việt	GK	8								3				11			
34	(Vietnam) Doãn Ngọc Tân	MF	5	1	2						2				7	1	2	
66	(Poland) Damian Vu Thanh	MF									1				1			
86	(Vietnam) Nguyễn Hữu Nam	MF	3												3			
88	(Vietnam) Nguyễn Văn Tú	MF	6		1						2		1		8	1	1	
89	(Vietnam) Lê Quốc Nhật Nam	MF	7								2				9			
95	(Vietnam) Júnior Brandão	FW	2								2				4			
97	(Vietnam) Triệu Việt Hưng	MF	8		1						3				11		1	
Own goals				0				0				0				0		
Totals				7	14	2		0	0	0		1	6	1		8	20	3

=== Goalscorers ===
As of 8 November 2026

The list is sorted by squad number when total goals are equal.

Rank	No.	Pos.	Player	V.League 1	Vietnamese Cup	AFC Champions League Two	Total
1	9	FW	(Brazil) Ribamar	2	0	1	3
2	2	DF	(United States) Kyle Colonna	1	0	0	1
2	7	MF	(Vietnam) Wesley Natã	1	0	0	
2	10	FW	(Brazil) Hernandes Rodrigues	1	0	0	1
2	11	MF	(Vietnam) Khuất Văn Khang	1	0	0	
2	34	MF	(Vietnam) Doãn Ngọc Tân	1	0	0	1
Totals				7	0	1	8

=== Disciplinary record ===
As of 20 November 2026

Rank	No.	Pos.	Player	V.League 1			Vietnamese Cup			AFC Champions League Two			Total		
Rank	No.	Pos.	Player	Yellow card	(yellow card) (yellow-red card)	Red card	Yellow card	(yellow card) (yellow-red card)	Red card	Yellow card	(yellow card) (yellow-red card)	Red card	Yellow card	(yellow card) (yellow-red card)	Red card
1	17	MF	(Vietnam) Nguyễn Đức Hoàng Minh	4	0	0	0	0	0	0	0	0	4	0	0
2	2	DF	(United States) Kyle Colonna	2	0	0	0	0	0	1	0	0	3	0	0
3	14	MF	(Brazil) Paulinho Curuá	0	0	1	0	0	0	0	1	0	0	1	1
3	23	FW	(Vietnam) Nhâm Mạnh Dũng	1	0	1	0	0	0	0	0	0	1	0	1
3	34	MF	(Vietnam) Doãn Ngọc Tân	2	0	0	0	0	0	0	0	0	2	0	0
3	88	FW	(Vietnam) Nguyễn Văn Tú	1	0	0	0	0	0	1	0	0	2	0	0
4	6	FW	(Vietnam) Trần Danh Trung	1	0	0	0	0	0	0	0	0	1	0	0
4	8	MF	(Vietnam) Nguyễn Hữu Thắng	1	0	0	0	0	0	0	0	0	1	0	0
4	12	DF	(Vietnam) Phan Tuấn Tài	1	0	0	0	0	0	0	0	0	1	0	0
4	13	FW	(Jamaica) Rimario Gordon	0	0	0	0	0	0	1	0	0	1	0	0
4	22	MF	(Vietnam) Nguyễn Hoàng Khanh	0	0	0	0	0	0	1	0	0	1	0	0
4	97	MF	(Vietnam) Triệu Việt Hưng	1	0	0	0	0	0	0	0	0	1	0	0
Total				14	0	2	0	0	0	4	1	0	18	1	2

=== Hat-tricks ===
As of In progress

Player	Against	Result	Date	Competition	Ref.

=== Clean sheets ===
As of 20 November 2026

Rank	No.	Nat.	Player	Matches played	Goals against	Clean sheets				
Rank	No.	Nat.	Player	Matches played	Goals against	V.League 1	Vietnamese Cup	AFC Champions League Two	Total	Clean sheet %
1	1	(Australia)	Lawrence Caruso	1	3	0	0	0	0	0%
1	28	(Vietnam)	Nguyễn Văn Việt	11	18	2	0	0	2	18.2%
Totals				12	21	2	0	0	2	18.2%
