= Hanoi derby =

Football match between Hanoi FC and Thể Công–Viettel FC

- Other names: Derby Thủ đô Derby Hà Nội
- Location: Hanoi, Vietnam
- Teams: Hanoi FC; Thể Công–Viettel FC
- First meeting: 29 December 2007; Vietnamese Cup; Thể Công–Viettel FC 0–0 (5-4 p) Hanoi FC
- Latest meeting: 1 March 2026; V.League 1 Thể Công–Viettel FC 1–0 Hanoi FC
- Next meeting: 11 December 2026; V.League 1 Thể Công–Viettel FC v Hanoi FC
- Stadiums: Hàng Đẫy Stadium (Hanoi FC); Mỹ Đình National Stadium (Thể Công–Viettel FC)

Statistics
- Total meetings: 23 (official matches)
- Most wins: Hanoi FC (10)
- Most player appearances: Trương Tiến Anh (18)
- Top scorer: Nguyễn Văn Quyết (5)
- All-time series: Hanoi FC: 10; Drawn: 6 Thể Công–Viettel FC: 7
- Largest victory: 15 September 2019; V.League 1 Hanoi FC 5–2 Thể Công–Viettel FC; 04 July 2024; Vietnamese Cup; Thể Công–Viettel FC 1–4 Hanoi FC
- Largest goal scoring: Hanoi FC (28 goals)
- Locations of the teams in Hanoi

The Hanoi derby (Vietnamese: Derby Hà Nội), also known as the Capital derby (Vietnamese: Derby thủ đô), is a football rivalry between Hanoi FC and Thể Công–Viettel FC, two clubs based in Hanoi. It is one of several local derbies involving Hanoi-based clubs. The two sides first met competitively in 2007.

== History ==
=== Early years ===
Hanoi FC was founded in 2006 as T&T Hanoi, while Thể Công traces its history to its establishment in 1954. The rivalry dates back to 29 December 2007, when the two sides first met competitively in the first round of the 2008 Vietnamese Cup. T&T Hanoi were then playing in the Vietnamese second tier, while Thể Công were in V.League 1. The match ended 0–0 before Thể Công won 5–4 on penalties.

=== Interruption ===
The rivalry was interrupted following the 2009 season. On 25 September 2009, the Ministry of Defence withdrew the Thể Công designation after 55 years. The V.League slot was subsequently transferred to Thanh Hoa, while Viettel continued its football programme separately. Viettel subsequently rebuilt its senior team through the lower divisions, eventually returning to V.League 1 for the 2019 season.

=== Revival ===
Viettel's return to the top flight brought the two clubs together again. Their meeting in the third round of the 2019 V.League 1 season marked the revival of the derby after nearly a decade. The rivalry became particularly prominent in 2020, when Viettel emerged as a direct challenger to Hanoi in the V.League 1 title race, with the two clubs finishing first and second respectively. The two sides also met in the Vietnamese Cup final, where Hanoi won 2–1.

In January 2021, the two sides met in the 2020 Vietnamese Super Cup, with Viettel entering as V.League 1 champions and Hanoi as Vietnamese Cup holders. Hanoi won the match 1–0 at Hàng Đẫy Stadium.

In November 2023, the Ministry of Defence restored the Thể Công designation to Viettel, and the club was renamed Thể Công–Viettel FC from the 2023–24 season.

== Statistics ==
=== Honours ===
Hanoi FC	Competition	Thể Công–Viettel FC
National
6	V.League 1	6
3	Vietnamese Cup	—
5	Vietnamese Super Cup	1
14	Aggregate	7
National (defunct)
—	North Vietnam Football Championship (defunct)	9
—	Hồng Hà League (defunct)	3
14	Total Aggregate	19

=== Head-to-head ===
As of 1 March 2026

	Hanoi FC wins	Draws	Thể Công–Viettel FC wins	Hanoi FC goals	Thể Công–Viettel FC goals
V.League 1
At Hanoi FC home	4	1	3	11	11
At Thể Công–Viettel FC home	3	4	2	9	6
Total	7	5	5	20	17
Vietnamese Cup
At Hanoi FC home	0	0	1	1	2
At Thể Công–Viettel FC home	2	1	1	6	3
Total	2	1	2	7	5
Vietnamese Super Cup
At Hanoi FC home	0	0	0	0	0
At Thể Công–Viettel FC home	1	0	0	1	0
Total	1	0	0	1	0
Official Matches Total
23	10	6	7	28	22

=== Head-to-head ranking in V.League 1 (2009–2026) ===
P.	09	10	11	12	13	14	15	16	17	18	19	20	22	23	24	25	26	27
1		1			1			1		1	1	1	1					
2			2	2		2	2					2		2		2	2	
3									3					3	3			
4	4												4			4	4	
5															5			
6											6							
7																		
8																		
9	9																	
10																		
11																		
12																		
13																		
14																		
V.League 2
1										1								
2								2										
3																		
4									4									
Vietnamese Second Divistion
1							1											
2																		
3					3	3												
Vietnamese Third Divistion
1				1														

Key
Hanoi FC
Thể Công–Viettel FC

- Total: Hanoi FC with 15 higher finishes, Thể Công–Viettel FC with 2 higher finish.

== Matches list ==
=== V.League 1 ===
Season	Hanoi FC – Thể Công–Viettel FC				Thể Công–Viettel FC – Hanoi FC			
Season	Date	Venue	Atten.	Score	Date	Venue	Atten.	Score
2009	06–06–2009	Hàng Đẫy Stadium	9,000	1–0	07–02–2009	Hàng Đẫy Stadium	10,000	1–1
2019	15–09–2019	Hàng Đẫy Stadium	Cl. doors	5–2	06–03–2019	Hàng Đẫy Stadium	14,000	0–2
2020					05–07–2020	Hàng Đẫy Stadium	15,000	1–1
2020					29–10–2020	Hàng Đẫy Stadium	3,000	0–0
2021	07–04–2021	Hàng Đẫy Stadium	5,000	0–1				
2022	9–11–2022	Hàng Đẫy Stadium	8,000	0–1	04–04–2022	Hàng Đẫy Stadium	5,000	0–1
2023	27–08–2023	Mỹ Đình National Stadium	9,000	3–2	05–02–2023	Hàng Đẫy Stadium	5,000	1–1
2023–24	09–05–2024	Hàng Đẫy Stadium	6,000	0–2	17–12–2023	Hàng Đẫy Stadium	7,000	0–2
2024–25	15–06–2025	Hàng Đẫy Stadium	5,000	1–2	22–09–2024	Mỹ Đình National Stadium	4,500	2–1
2025–26	20–09–2025	Hàng Đẫy Stadium	10,000	1–1	01–03–2026	Hàng Đẫy Stadium	9,000	1–0
2026–27	23/25–04–2027	Hàng Đẫy Stadium			11–12–2026	Hàng Đẫy Stadium		

=== Vietnamese Cup ===
Season	Round	Leg	Date	Venue	Referee	Atten.	Match	Score	Winner
2008	First Round		29–12–2007	Mỹ Đình National Stadium	(Vietnam) Đỗ Quốc Hoài	1,200	TCVT – HNFC	0–0 (5–4 p)	TCVT
2020	Final		20–09–2020	Hàng Đẫy Stadium	(Vietnam) Nguyễn Đình Thái	4,000	TCVT – HNFC	1–2	HNFC
2023	Round of 16		06–07–2023	Hàng Đẫy Stadium	(Vietnam) Hoàng Thanh Bình	4,000	HNFC – TCVT	1–2	TCVT
2023–24	Semi-finals		04–07–2024	Hàng Đẫy Stadium	(Vietnam) Nguyễn Viết Duẩn	5,000	TCVT – HNFC	1–4	HNFC
2025–26	First Round		14–09–2025	Hàng Đẫy Stadium	(Vietnam) Hoàng Thanh Bình	5,000	TCVT – HNFC	1–0	TCVT

• Series won: Hanoi FC 2, Thể Công–Viettel FC 3.

=== Vietnamese Super Cup ===
Season	Date	Venue	Referee	Atten.	Match	Score	Winner
2020	09–01–2021	Hàng Đẫy Stadium	(Vietnam) Ngô Duy Lân	4,200	TCVT – HNFC	0–1	HNFC

• Series won: Hanoi FC 1, Thể Công–Viettel FC 0.

== Records ==
=== Most appearances ===
As of 1 March 2026

- Players in **bold** are still active

Position	Player	Team	Caps
1	(Vietnam) **Trương Tiến Anh**	Thể Công–Viettel FC	18
2	(Vietnam) **Nguyễn Thành Chung**	Hanoi FC	17
2	(Vietnam) **Bùi Tiến Dũng**	Thể Công–Viettel FC	17
2	(Vietnam) **Nguyễn Hoàng Đức**	Thể Công–Viettel FC	17
3	(Vietnam) **Nguyễn Văn Quyết**	Hanoi FC	16
4	(Vietnam) **Nguyễn Đức Chiến**	Thể Công–Viettel FC	15
4	(Vietnam) **Đỗ Hùng Dũng**	Hanoi FC	15
5	(Vietnam) **Lê Văn Xuân**	Hanoi FC	14
5	(Vietnam) **Nhâm Mạnh Dũng**	Thể Công–Viettel FC	14
6	(Vietnam) **Đỗ Duy Mạnh**	Hanoi FC	13
7	(Vietnam) **Phạm Tuấn Hải**	Hanoi FC	12
7	(Vietnam) **Phan Tuấn Tài**	Thể Công–Viettel FC	12
7	(Vietnam) **Nguyễn Hữu Thắng**	Thể Công–Viettel FC	12
8	(Vietnam) **Nguyễn Thanh Bình**	Thể Công–Viettel FC	10
8	(Vietnam) **Bùi Duy Thường**	Thể Công–Viettel FC	10
8	(Vietnam) **Trần Văn Kiên**	Hanoi FC	10
8	(Vietnam) **Dương Văn Hào**	Thể Công–Viettel FC	10
8	(Vietnam) **Nguyễn Hai Long**	Hanoi FC	10

=== Top scorers ===
- Players in **bold** are still active

Rank	Player	Club	V.League 1	Vietnamese Cup	Vietnamese Super Cup	Total
1	(Vietnam) **Nguyễn Văn Quyết**	Hanoi FC	4	1	0	5
2	(Vietnam) **Nguyễn Hoàng Đức**	Thể Công–Viettel FC	3	1	0	4
3	(Vietnam) **Phạm Tuấn Hải**	Hanoi FC	2	1	0	3
3	(Vietnam) **Nguyễn Quang Hải**	Hanoi FC	2	1	0	3
5	(Brazil) **Bruno Cantanhede**	Thể Công–Viettel FC	2	0	0	2
5	(Vietnam) **Nguyễn Thành Chung**	Hanoi FC	2	0	0	2
5	(Vietnam) **Nguyễn Hữu Thắng**	Thể Công–Viettel FC	1	1	0	2
5	(Vietnam) **Bùi Hoàng Việt Anh**	Hanoi FC	1	0	1	2
5	(Vietnam) **Trương Văn Thái Quý**	Hanoi FC	1	1	0	2
5	(Brazil) **Pedro Henrique**	Thể Công–Viettel FC	1	1	0	2
5	(Cameroon) **Diederrick Joel Tagueu**	Hanoi FC	0	2	0	2

=== Clean sheets ===
- Players in **bold** are still active

Players	Hanoi FC clean sheets	Thể Công–Viettel FC clean sheets	Total
(Vietnam) **Nguyễn Văn Công**	3	-	3
(Vietnam) **Bùi Tấn Trường**	2	-	2
(Vietnam) **Trần Nguyên Mạnh**	-	2	2
(Vietnam) **Nguyễn Văn Việt**	-	2	2
(Vietnam) **Quàng Thế Tài**	-	1	1
(Vietnam) **Nguyễn Văn Hoàng**	1	-	1
(Vietnam) Dương Hồng Sơn	1	-	1

== Asian Competition Record ==
=== Hanoi FC ===
Competition	App	Pld	W	D	L	Goals
Asian Club Champion Tournament / Asian Club Championship / AFC Champions League / AFC Champions League Elite	6	15	6	0	9	19–35
AFC Cup / AFC Champions League Two	5	35	19	9	7	73–41
Total	11	50	25	9	16	92–76

=== Thể Công–Viettel FC ===
Competition	App	Pld	W	D	L	Goals
Asian Club Champion Tournament / Asian Club Championship / AFC Champions League / AFC Champions League Elite	2	8	2	1	5	8–16
AFC Cup / AFC Champions League Two	2	8	3	2	3	12–13
Total	4	16	5	3	8	20–29

Last updated: 4 November 2026

== Played for both teams ==
From Hanoi FC to Thể Công–Viettel FC

- (Vietnam) (Brazil) Nguyễn Tài Lộc
- (Brazil) Lucão do Break
- (Vietnam) (United States) Lương Chí Khải
- (Vietnam) Đào Văn Nam
- (Jamaica) Rimario Gordon
- (Vietnam) Phí Minh Long

From Thể Công–Viettel FC to Hanoi FC

- (Cameroon) François Endene
- (Vietnam) Nguyễn Ngọc Duy
- (Vietnam) Nguyễn Quốc Long
- (Vietnam) Thạch Bảo Khanh
- (Vietnam) Nguyễn Văn Quyết (Note: From Viettel's youth team)
- (Brazil) Bruno Cantanhede (Note: Returned to Thể Công–Viettel FC in 2023 after joining Hanoi FC for the 2021 season.)
- (Vietnam) Vũ Minh Tuấn
- (Uzbekistan) Jahongir Abdumominov
- (Vietnam) Nguyễn Xuân Kiên
