= Cong An Hanoi FC–The Cong-Viettel FC rivalry =

Football match between Cong An Hanoi FC and The Cong–Viettel

Cong An Hanoi–The Cong-Viettel rivalry
- Other names: Derby Thủ đô Derby lực lượng vũ trang
- Location: Hanoi, Vietnam
- Teams: Cong An Hanoi; The Cong–Viettel
- First meeting: Unknown
- Latest meeting: The Cong–Viettel 1–0 Cong An Hanoi; V.League 1 (7 June 2026)
- Next meeting: The Cong–Viettel v Cong An Hanoi; V.League 1 (10 September 2026)
- Stadiums: Hàng Đẫy Stadium (Cong An Hanoi); Mỹ Đình National Stadium (The Cong–Viettel)

Statistics
- Total meetings: 40 (official matches)
- Most wins: The Cong–Viettel (10)
- Largest victory: Cong An Hanoi 5–0 The Cong; National Elite League (10 March 1996)
- Largest goal scoring: Cong An Hanoi 3–3 The Cong; National First Division (July 1997)
- Locations of the teams in Hanoi

The Công An Hà Nội–Thể Công-Viettel derby, also known as Capital derby (Vietnamese: Derby thủ đô) or Armed forces derby (Vietnamese: Derby lực lượng vũ trang), refers to football matches between Cong An Hanoi and The Cong–Viettel in Hanoi, first contested in 1956. Both clubs are among the most successful football clubs back in the Democratic Republic of Vietnam, and the current unified Vietnam, and are leading teams representing the two core components of the Vietnam People's Armed Forces: the People's Public Security Forces (CAHN) and the People's Army of Vietnam (TCVT). Cong An Hanoi plays at the Hàng Đẫy Stadium and The Cong–Viettel at the Mỹ Đình National Stadium.

== History ==
Before the unification of Vietnam, Cong An Hanoi and The Cong were among the powerhouse of North Vietnamese football, with each team representing one of the two main armed forces in the country. Therefore, the early Hanoi derby was referred as the Army–Police derby. Thể Công won 9 North Vietnam national titles, while Cong An Hanoi won 3. The two teams continued to be a major force in Vietnamese football after the unification until the 2000s, when both team declined after the professionalisation of the Vietnamese National Championship. In 2003, Cong An Hanoi sold their league participation spot to Vietnam Airlines and dissolved.

Viettel returned to the V.League 1 in 2019, while Cong An Hanoi joined them in 2023. On 14 February 2023, Viettel defeated Cong An Hanoi 2–1 in third matchday of the 2023 season at Hàng Đẫy. This was the first encounter between the two teams in the top-flight after 21 years.

== Honours ==
=== Team honours ===
As of 7 June 2026

Team	League	National Cup	Super Cup	Total
Cong An Hanoi	3	1	1	5
The Cong–Viettel	6	0	1	7
Combined	9	1	2	12

== All-time results ==
As of 7 June 2026

Competition	Matches	Wins		Draws	Goals	
Competition	Matches	TCVT	CAHN	Draws	TCVT	CAHN
V.League 1	26	11	8	7	26	30
Vietnamese Cup	4	1	1	2	5	6
Vietnamese Super Cup	0	0	0	0	0	0
V.League 2	2	2	0	0	6	1
Second Division	6	4	2	0	11	7
Third Division	1	0	0	1	2	2
Dunhill Cup	1	0	1	0	0	2
Total	40	18	12	10	50	48

== Matches list ==
=== League ===
Cong An Hanoi vs The Cong–Viettel
Date	Venue	Score	Competition	Attendance
4 April 1982	Unknown	1–0	National A1 League	N/A
1 May 1984	Hàng Đẫy	2–1	National A1 League	25,000
May 1985	Unknown	4–1	National A1 League	N/A
10 March 1996	Hàng Đẫy	5–0	National Elite League	N/A
July 1997	Hàng Đẫy	3–3	National First Division	N/A
1 March 1998	Hàng Đẫy	0–0	National First Division	N/A
February 2000	Hàng Đẫy	0–0	National First Division	N/A
January 2001	Hàng Đẫy	0–0	V-League	N/A
14 April 2002	Hàng Đẫy	0–1	V-League	N/A
30 October 2008	Hà Đông	2–2 (4–5 p)	National Third Division	N/A
15 May 2009	Hà Đông	2–1	National Second Division	800
27 June 2013	Hà Đông	1–4	National Second Division	200
12 May 2014	Hà Đông	2–0	National Second Division	500
2 June 2018	Thanh Trì	0–4	V.League 2	1,000
14 February 2023	Hàng Đẫy	1–2	V.League 1	9,000
26 May 2024	Hàng Đẫy	1–2	V.League 1	12,000
23 February 2025	Hàng Đẫy	2–1	V.League 1	8,000
15 August 2025	Hàng Đẫy	1–1	V.League 1	11,950

CAHN wins	Draws	TCVT wins
7	6	5

The Cong–Viettel vs Cong An Hanoi
Date	Venue	Score	Competition	Attendance
April 1984	Unknown	1–3	National A1 League	N/A
May 1989	Unknown	1–0	National A1 League	N/A
April 1992	Cột Cờ	1–0	National Elite League	N/A
June 1996	Cột Cờ	0–0	National Elite League	N/A
March 1997	Cột Cờ	1–0	National First Division	N/A
April 1998	Cột Cờ	0–1	National First Division	N/A
November 1999	Hàng Đẫy	2–1	National First Division	N/A
April 2001	Hàng Đẫy	2–1	V-League	N/A
23 December 2001	Hàng Đẫy	0–0	V-League	N/A
5 June 2009	Vietnam YFTC	3–2	National Second Division	150
28 May 2013	Vietnam YFTC	2–0	National Second Division	300
14 April 2014	Hàng Đẫy	1–0	National Second Division	300
6 July 2018	Hàng Đẫy	2–1	V.League 2	500
12 August 2023	Hàng Đẫy	0–3	V.League 1	14,000
9 March 2024	Hàng Đẫy	3–0	V.League 1	8,000
19 February 2025	Mỹ Đình	2–1	V.League 1	6,500
7 June 2026	Thiên Trường	1–0	V.League 1	2,800

TCVT wins	Draws	CAHN wins
12	2	3

=== Cup ===
Date	Venue	Score	Competition	Attendance
22 October 1998	Vinh	2–0	Dunhill Cup semi-finals	N/A
12 June 2001	Hàng Đẫy	1–1 (4–2 p)	Vietnamese Cup semi-finals	2,000
13 March 2024	Hàng Đẫy	1–0	Vietnamese Cup round of 16	5,000
26 June 2025	Hàng Đẫy	3–1	Vietnamese Cup semi-finals	10,800
23 November 2025	Hàng Đẫy	2–2 (3–4 p)	Vietnamese Cup round of 16	12,650

CAHN wins	Draws	TCVT wins
2	2	1

== Played for both teams ==
From Cong An Hanoi to The Cong–Viettel

- (Vietnam) Bùi Văn Đức
- (Vietnam) Phạm Trung Hiếu

From The Cong–Viettel to Cong An Hanoi

- (Vietnam) Đặng Quang Huy
- (Brazil) Jeferson Elías
- (Brazil) Geovane Magno
- (Vietnam) Trương Văn Thiết
- (Vietnam) Đinh Thanh Bình
