= Nguyễn Mạnh Cường =

Vietnamese footballer (born 1965)

Personal information
- Full name: Nguyễn Mạnh Cường
- Date of birth: 5 August 1965 (age 61)
- Place of birth: Hanoi, North Vietnam
- Height: 1.71 m (5 ft 7 in)
- Position: Center back

Senior career*
Years	Team	Apps	(Gls)
1984–1997	Thể Công		

International career
1991–1997	Vietnam	32	(1)

Managerial career
- 2005–2006: Thể Công
- 2007: Vietnam U20
- 2009–2010: Viettel
- 2011: Quảng Nam
- 2013–: PVF
- * Club domestic league appearances and goals

Nguyễn Mạnh Cường (born 5 August 1965) is a Vietnamese former footballer and manager.

== Career ==
Mạnh Cường started his senior career with Vietnamese side Thể Công at the age of nineteen and spent his entire career there.

In the 1990s, Mạnh Cường was the main centre back of the Vietnam national team. There, he captained the team during several tournaments and was always a safe stopper of Vietnam in regional competitions such as SEA Games or Tiger Cup.

After his retirement, Mạnh Cường became a manager and coached his former club Thể Công from 2005 to 2006.
