= Quản Trọng Hùng =

Vietnamese footballer (born 1956)

Personal information
- Place of birth: Hanoi, North Vietnam
- Position: Center back

Senior career*
Years	Team	Apps	(Gls)
1973–1995	Thể Công		

International career
1991	Vietnam	3	(0)

Managerial career
- 1999: Vietnam U23
- 2000–2003: Thể Công
- 2000: Vietnam U20
- * Club domestic league appearances and goals

Quản Trọng Hùng (born 1956) is a Vietnamese football manager and former footballer.

== Career ==
Ngô spent his entire playing career with Thể Công.

In 1991, at the age of 35, he made his debut for the Vietnam national team and captained the team in their three games at the 1991 SEA Games.

He worked as a manager after retiring from professional football.
