= Khuất Văn Khang =

Vietnamese footballer (born 2003)

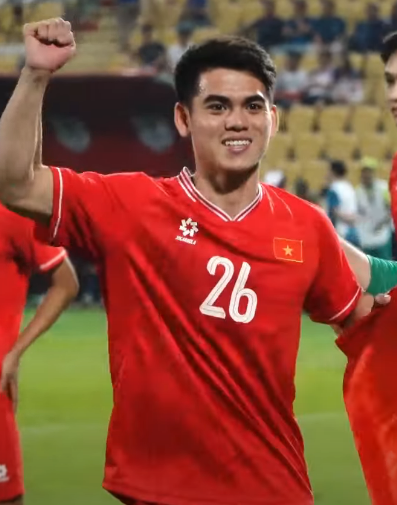
- Văn Khang in 2025

Personal information
- Full name: Khuất Văn Khang
- Date of birth: 11 May 2003 (age 23)
- Place of birth: Phúc Thọ, Hanoi, Vietnam
- Height: 1.68 m (5 ft 6 in)
- Positions: Attacking midfielder; winger

Team information
- Current team: Thể Công-Viettel
- Number: 11

Youth career
- 2013–2021: Viettel

Senior career*
Years	Team	Apps	(Gls)
2022–	Thể Công-Viettel	85	(13)

International career^{‡}
2017–2018	Vietnam U15	6	(1)
2018–2019	Vietnam U16	3	(1)
2022–2023	Vietnam U20	19	(9)
2022–2026	Vietnam U23	48	(5)
2022–	Vietnam	25	(1)
Medal record
Men's football
Representing Vietnam
AFC U-23 Asian Cup
Third place	Saudi Arabia 2026
ASEAN Championship
Winner	ASEAN 2024
SEA Games
Gold medal – first place	Bangkok 2025	Team
Bronze medal – third place	Phnom Penh 2023	Team
ASEAN U-23 Championship
Winner	Thailand 2023
Winner	Indonesia 2025
AFF U-19 Youth Championship
Third place	Indonesia 2022
AFF U-17 Youth Championship
Winner	Thailand 2017
- * Club domestic league appearances and goals as of 20 November 2026 ‡ National team caps and goals as of 17 November 2026

Khuất Văn Khang (born 11 May 2003) is a Vietnamese professional footballer who plays as an attacking midfielder and winger for V.League 1 club Thể Công-Viettel and the Vietnam national team.

Văn Khang signed for Viettel in 2013 and made his professional debut for them in the V.League 1 in October 2022.

Having represented Vietnam at under-15, under-16, under-20 and under-23 levels, Văn Khang made his senior debut for Vietnam in September 2022.

== Club career ==
In 2013, Khuất Văn Khang started his career as a player at the training system of Viettel. He was promoted to Viettel's first team for the second part of the 2022 season. On 18 October 2022, he made his professional debut in a league game against Hoàng Anh Gia Lai.

== International career ==
=== Youth ===
In 2017, Văn Khang and Vietnam U15 won the championship 2017 AFF U-15 Championship.

In 2018, at 2018 AFC U-16 Championship, although U-16 Vietnam was eliminated from the group stage, but Văn Khang still left a mark with a sublime free-kick goal against U-16 Indonesia.

Khuất Văn Khang debuts U-23 Vietnam in a 2–2 draw against U-23 Thailand at 2022 AFC U-23 Asian Cup. In the match against U-23 Korea Republic after that, Văn Khang and the whole team created "seismic" when his team was able to draw the opponent, he was also personally rated as man of the match.

=== Senior ===
On 21 September 2022, Văn Khang made his international debut with Vietnam in the 2022 VFF Tri-Nations Series, appearing and also scored his first international goal in 4–0 win against Singapore.

In January 2024, he was named in Vietnam's 26-men squad for the 2023 AFC Asian Cup.

== Career statistics ==
=== Club ===
As of match played 20 November 2026

Appearances and goals by club, season and competition
Club	Season	League			Cup		Continental		Other		Total	
Club	Season	Division	Apps	Goals	Apps	Goals	Apps	Goals	Apps	Goals	Apps	Goals
Thể Công-Viettel	2022	V.League 1	1	0	0	0	0	0	—		1	0
Thể Công-Viettel	2023	V.League 1	8	0	0	0	—		—		8	0
Thể Công-Viettel	2023–24	V.League 1	24	3	3	0	—		—		27	3
Thể Công-Viettel	2024–25	V.League 1	25	5	3	1	—		—		28	6
Thể Công-Viettel	2025–26	V.League 1	21	4	4	0	—		—		25	4
Thể Công-Viettel	2026–27	V.League 1	6	1	0	0	3 (Note: Appearances in AFC Champions League Two)	0	—		9	1
Total career			85	13	10	1	3	0	0	0	98	14

=== International ===
As of match played 17 November 2026

Appearances and goals by national team and year
National team	Year	Apps	Goals
Vietnam	2022	2	1
Vietnam	2023	6	0
Vietnam	2024	12	0
Vietnam	2025	2	0
Vietnam	2026	3	0
Total		25	1

Scores and results list Vietnam's goal tally first.

No.	Date	Venue	Opponent	Score	Result	Competition
1.	21 September 2022	Thống Nhất Stadium, Ho Chi Minh City, Vietnam	Singapore	4–0	4–0	2022 VFF Tri-Nations Series

==== U-15 ====
#	Date	Location	Opponent	Score	Result	Competition
1.	14 July 2017	IPE Chonburi Stadium, Chonburi, Thailand	Philippines	6–0	7–0	2017 AFF U-15 Youth Championship

==== U-16 ====
#	Date	Location	Opponent	Score	Result	Competition
1.	24 September 2018	Bukit Jalil National Stadium, Kuala Lumpur, Malaysia	Indonesia	1–0	1–1	2018 AFC U-16 Championship

==== U-19 ====
#	Date	Location	Opponent	Score	Result	Competition
1.	4 July 2022	GBK Madya Stadium, Jakarta, Indonesia	Philippines	3–1	4–1	2022 AFF U-19 Youth Championship
2.	8 July 2022	GBK Madya Stadium, Jakarta, Indonesia	Myanmar	3–0	3–1	2022 AFF U-19 Youth Championship
3.	10 July 2022	GBK Madya Stadium, Jakarta, Indonesia	Thailand	1–1	1–1	2022 AFF U-19 Youth Championship
4.	7 August 2022	Go Dau Stadium, Binh Duong, Vietnam	Malaysia	2–1	2–1	2022 International U-19 Thanh Niên Newspaper Cup
5.	14 September 2022	Gelora Bung Tomo Stadium, Surabaya, Indonesia	Hong Kong	4–0	5–1	2023 AFC U-20 Asian Cup qualification
6.	16 September 2022	Gelora Bung Tomo Stadium, Surabaya, Indonesia	Timor-Leste	4–0	4–0	2023 AFC U-20 Asian Cup qualification
7.	18 February 2023	Prince Faisal bin Fahd Stadium, Riyadh, Saudi Arabia	Saudi Arabia	1–0	2–1	Friendly

==== U-23 ====
#	Date	Location	Opponent	Score	Result	Competition
1.	16 May 2023	Olympic Stadium, Phnom Penh, Cambodia	Myanmar	3–0	3–0	2023 SEA Games
2.	19 September 2023	Linping Sports Centre Stadium, Hangzhou, China	Mongolia	3–0	4–2	2022 Asian Games
3.	20 April 2024	Khalifa International Stadium, Al Rayyan, Qatar	Malaysia	1–0	2–0	2024 AFC U-23 Asian Cup
4.	19 July 2025	Patriot Candrabhaga Stadium, Bekasi, Indonesia	Laos	1–0	3–0	2025 ASEAN U-23 Championship
5.	9 January 2026	King Abdullah Sports City Hall Stadium, Jeddah, Saudi Arabia	Kyrgyzstan	1–0	2–1	2026 AFC U-23 Asian Cup

== Honours ==
Vietnam U15

- AFF U-15 Youth Championship: 2017

Vietnam U19

- AFF U-19 Youth Championship third place: 2022
- International Thanh Niên Newspaper Cup: 2022

Vietnam U23

- SEA Games gold medal: 2025; bronze medal: 2023
- ASEAN U-23 Championship: 2023, 2025
- AFC U-23 Asian Cup: third place 2026

Vietnam

- ASEAN Championship: 2024
- VFF Cup: 2022

Individual

- AFF U-23 Championship Team of the Tournament: 2023
