= Ribamar =

Brazilian footballer

Personal information
- Full name: Lucas Ribamar Lopes dos Santos Bibiano
- Date of birth: 21 May 1997 (age 29)
- Place of birth: Rio de Janeiro, Brazil
- Height: 1.84 m (6 ft 0 in)
- Position: Striker

Team information
- Current team: The Cong-Viettel
- Number: 9

Youth career
- 2011–2016: Botafogo

Senior career*
| Years | Team | Apps | (Gls) |
| 2016 | Botafogo | 30 | (4) |
| 2016–2017 | 1860 Munich | 3 | (0) |
| 2017–2018 | Atlético Paranaense | 22 | (5) |
| 2018–2021 | Pyramids | 3 | (2) |
| 2018 | → Ohod (loan) | 11 | (3) |
| 2019–2021 | → Vasco da Gama (loan) | 55 | (7) |
| 2021 | América Mineiro | 30 | (3) |
| 2022 | Ponte Preta | 18 | (4) |
| 2023 | Chapecoense | 22 | (4) |
| 2023–2024 | Náutico | 4 | (2) |
| 2024 | Remo | 30 | (1) |
| 2024–2026 | Dong A Thanh Hoa | 22 | (12) |
| 2026 | SHB Da Nang | 12 | (3) |
| 2026– | The Cong-Viettel | 1 | (1) |
- * Club domestic league appearances and goals as of 6 September 2025

Lucas Ribamar Lopes dos Santos Bibiano (born 21 May 1997), commonly known as Ribamar, is a Brazilian professional footballer who plays as a striker for V.League 1 club The Cong-Viettel.

== Career ==
=== Botafogo ===
Born and raised in Rio de Janeiro, Ribamar was raised by his divorced parents. He trialled with Botafogo, whom he subsequently joined aged 14.

Having scored 17 goals in 37 games and become top scorer of the "Octavio Pinto Guimaraes" tournament in 2015, he was promoted to Botafogo's first team in 2016.

In early July 2016, Ribamar agreed to join the Apollon for a €2.5 million transfer fee. However, the Cypriot club withdrew from the contract.

=== 1860 Munich ===
In late July 2016, he joined 1860 Munich on a five-year contract, for a reported €2.5 million transfer fee.

=== América Mineiro ===
On 9 March 2021, Ribamar joined América Mineiro on a permanent deal, signing a contract until December 2021.

=== Dong A Thanh Hoa ===
In October 2024, Ribamar moved to Vietnam, joining for V.League 1 club Dong A Thanh Hoa as an emergency signing to replace the team's injured Rimario Gordon.

=== The Cong-Viettel ===
On 12 August 2026, Ribamar signed for The Cong-Viettel.

== Career statistics ==
As of 23 January 2022.

| Club | Season | League | | | State League | | Cup | | Continental | | Other | | Total | |
| Club | Season | Division | Apps | Goals | Apps | Goals | Apps | Goals | Apps | Goals | Apps | Goals | Apps | Goals |
|---|---|---|---|---|---|---|---|---|---|---|---|---|---|---|
| Botafogo | 2016 | Série A | 12 | 1 | 18 (Note: Appearance(s) in Campeonato Carioca.) | 3 | 2 | 0 | — | | — | | 32 | 4 |
| 1860 Munich | 2016–17 | 2. Bundesliga | 3 | 0 | — | | 1 | 0 | — | | — | | 4 | 0 |
| Atlético Paranaense | 2017 | Série A | 19 | 5 | 0 | 0 | 2 | 0 | 1 (Note: Appearance(s) in Copa Libertadores.) | 0 | — | | 22 | 5 |
| Atlético Paranaense | 2018 | Série A | 3 | 0 | 0 | 0 | 4 | 0 | 1 (Note: Appearance(s) in Copa Sudamericana.) | 0 | — | | 8 | 0 |
| Atlético Paranaense | Total | | 22 | 5 | 0 | 0 | 6 | 0 | 2 | 0 | — | | 30 | 5 |
| Pyramids | 2018–19 | Premier League | 3 | 2 | — | | — | | — | | — | | 3 | 2 |
| Ohod (loan) | 2018–19 | MS League | 11 | 3 | — | | — | | — | | — | | 11 | 3 |
| Vasco da Gama (loan) | 2019 | Série A | 21 | 3 | 11 | 0 | 2 | 1 | — | | — | | 34 | 4 |
| Vasco da Gama (loan) | 2020 | Série A | 15 | 4 | 8 | 0 | 3 | 0 | 4 | 0 | — | | 30 | 4 |
| Vasco da Gama (loan) | Total | | 36 | 7 | 19 | 0 | 5 | 1 | 4 | 0 | — | | 64 | 8 |
| América Mineiro | 2021 | Série A | 20 | 2 | 10 (Note: Appearance(s) in Campeonato Mineiro.) | 1 | 3 | 0 | — | | — | | 33 | 3 |
| Career total | | | 107 | 20 | 47 | 4 | 17 | 1 | 6 | 0 | 0 | 0 | 177 | 25 |

== Honours ==
=== Individual ===
- Campeonato Carioca Team of the year: 2016
