= Wesley Natã (footballer, born 1995) =

Brazilian footballer (born 1995)

Personal information
- Full name: Wesley Natã Wachholz
- Date of birth: 18 April 1995 (age 31)
- Place of birth: Porto Alegre, Brazil
- Height: 1.83 m (6 ft 0 in)
- Positions: Winger; attacking midfielder

Team information
- Current team: The Cong-Viettel
- Number: 7

Youth career
- Chapecoense

Senior career*
Years	Team	Apps	(Gls)
2016–2019	Chapecoense	3	(0)
2016	→ Concórdia (loan)	0	(0)
2016	→ Bahia (loan)	5	(2)
2017	→ Juventude (loan)	19	(0)
2018	→ Atlético Goianiense (loan)	15	(0)
2019	→ Votuporanguense (loan)	11	(1)
2019–2020	Tsarsko Selo	29	(3)
2020–2022	Riga FC	33	(3)
2022–2024	Rodina Moscow	47	(4)
2024–	The Cong-Viettel	48	(4)
- * Club domestic league appearances and goals as of 7 June 2026

Wesley Natã Wachholz (born 18 April 1995), known as Wesley Natã or simply Wesley, is a Brazilian professional footballer who plays as a winger or attacking midfielder for V.League 1 club The Cong–Viettel.

== Club career ==
Born in Porto Alegre, Rio Grande do Sul, Wesley was a Chapecoense youth graduate. He made his senior debut on 24 April 2016, coming on as a late substitute for fellow youth graduate Hyoran in a 2–3 Campeonato Catarinense away loss against Criciúma.

In July 2016, Wesley was loaned to Concórdia. On 13 September, he moved to Série B side Bahia, also in a temporary deal. He made his professional debut on 9 October, starting and scoring the second in a 4–0 home routing of Tupi. In the summer of 2019 he signed with Bulgarian club Tsarsko Selo Sofia.

In August 2024, Vietnamese side The Cong–Viettel announced their signature of Wesley to the team.

== Honours ==
Chapecoense

- Campeonato Catarinense: 2016

Riga

- Latvian Higher League: 2020
