= Nguyễn Văn Việt (footballer, born 2002) =

Vietnamese footballer

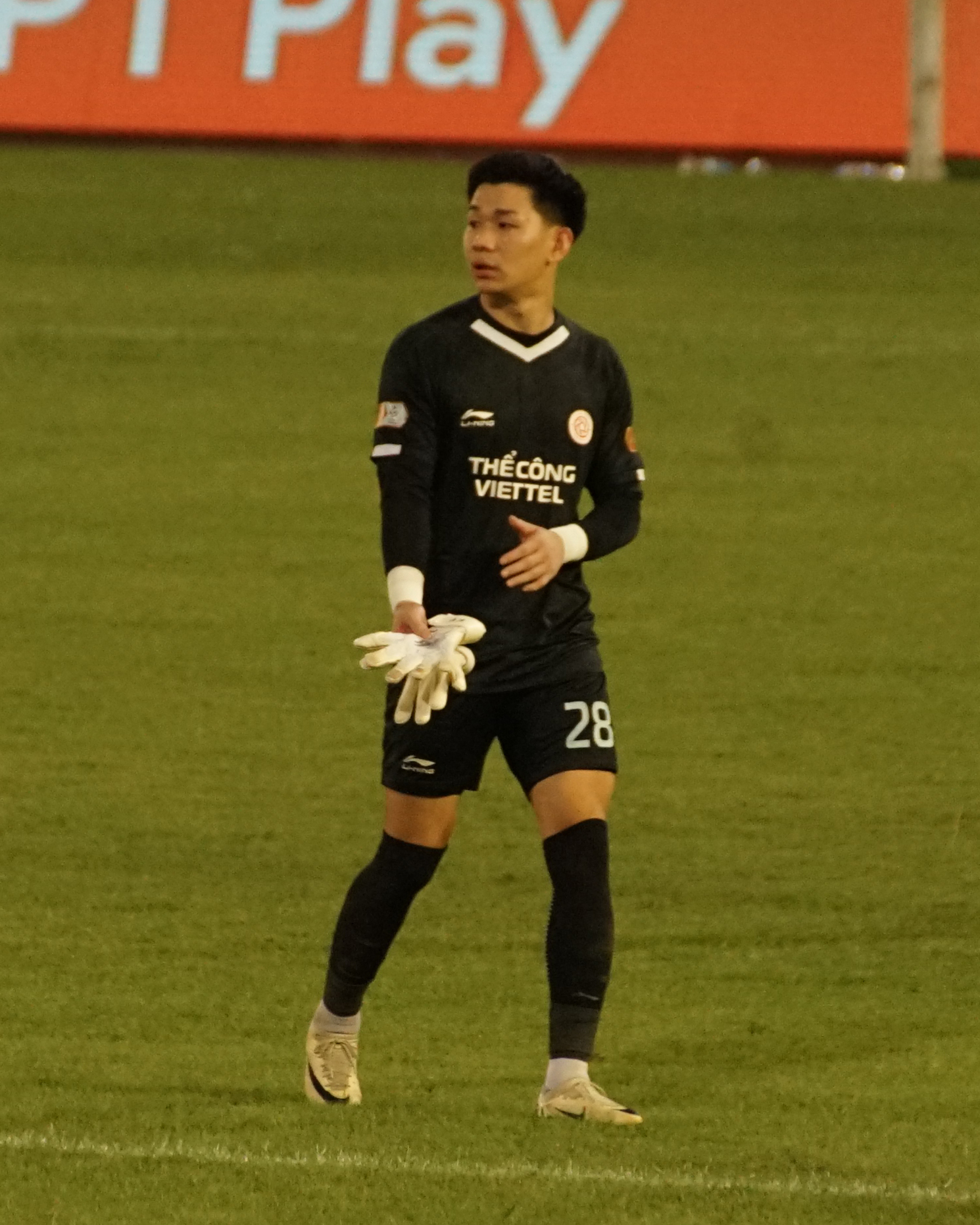
- Văn Việt in 2026

Personal information
- Full name: Nguyễn Văn Việt
- Date of birth: 12 July 2002 (age 24)
- Place of birth: Tân Kỳ, Nghệ An, Vietnam
- Height: 1.81 m (5 ft 11 in)
- Position: Goalkeeper

Team information
- Current team: Thể Công-Viettel (on loan from Sông Lam Nghệ An)
- Number: 28

Youth career
- 2017–2022: Sông Lam Nghệ An

Senior career*
Years	Team	Apps	(Gls)
2022–	Sông Lam Nghệ An	58	(0)
2025–	→ Thể Công-Viettel (loan)	33	(0)

International career^{‡}
2017–2018	Vietnam U16	3	(0)
2019–2020	Vietnam U20	3	(0)
2023–2024	Vietnam U23	5	(0)
2023–	Vietnam	1	(0)
Medal record
Men's football
Representing Vietnam
AFF U-15 Championship
Winner	Thailand 2017
AFF U-23 Championship
Winner	Thailand 2023
- * Club domestic league appearances and goals as of 20 November 2026 ‡ National team caps and goals as of 6 September 2023

Nguyễn Văn Việt (born 12 July 2002) is a Vietnamese professional footballer who plays as a goalkeeper for V.League 1 club Thể Công-Viettel, on loan from Sông Lam Nghệ An, and the Vietnam national team.

== Club career ==
Born in Nghệ An, Văn Việt joined the Sông Lam Nghệ An football academy in 2013 after winning a youth regional tournament. For the 2022 season, he was promoted to Sông Lam Nghệ An's first team as the fourth choice goalkeeper.

On 20 May 2023, Văn Việt made his V.League 1 debut in the Nghệ-Tĩnh derby against Hong Linh Ha Tinh. After his good performances in matches, Văn Việt surpassed Nguyễn Văn Hoàng to become the starting goalkeeper for Sông Lam Nghệ An for the rest of the season.

On 8 July 2025, Văn Việt joined V.League 1 fellow Thể Công-Viettel on loan deal until summer 2027.

== International career ==
=== Youth ===
Văn Việt was a member of the Vietnam U15 winning team in the 2017 AFF U-15 Championship, making one appearance against Timor-Leste U15 in the group stage.

=== Senior ===
In June 2023, Văn Việt received his first called up to the Vietnam senior team from coach Philippe Troussier for the friendly match against Syria. He made his debut for the senior national squad on 13 October 2023 in a friendly match against Uzbekistan.

In January 2024, Văn Việt featured in Vietnam's 26-men squad for the 2023 AFC Asian Cup.

== Career statistics ==
=== Club ===
As of match played 20 November 2026

Appearances and goals by club, season and competition
Club	Season	League			National cup		Continental		Other		Total	
Club	Season	Division	Apps	Goals	Apps	Goals	Apps	Goals	Apps	Goals	Apps	Goals
Song Lam Nghe An	2022	V.League 1	0	0	0	0	—		—		0	0
Song Lam Nghe An	2023	V.League 1	9	0	0	0	—		—		9	0
Song Lam Nghe An	2023–24	V.League 1	24	0	0	0	—		—		24	0
Song Lam Nghe An	2024–25	V.League 1	25	0	4	0	—		—		29	0
Song Lam Nghe An	Total		58	0	4	0	0	0	0	0	62	0
Thể Công-Viettel	2025–26	V.League 1	25	0	4	0	—		—		29	0
Thể Công-Viettel	2026–27	V.League 1	8	0	0	0	3 (Note: Appearances in AFC Champions League Two)	0	—		11	0
Thể Công-Viettel	Total		33	0	4	0	3	0	0	0	40	0
Career total			91	0	8	0	3	0	0	0	102	0

=== International ===
As of match played 13 October 2023

National team	Years	Apps	Goals
Vietnam	2023	1	0
Total		1	0

== Honours ==
Vietnam U15

- AFF U-15 Youth Championship: 2017

Vietnam U16

- JENESYS Japan-ASEAN U-16 Youth Football Tournament runner-up: 2017

Vietnam U23

- AFF U-23 Championship: 2023
