= Damian Vu Thanh =

Polish footballer (born 2003)

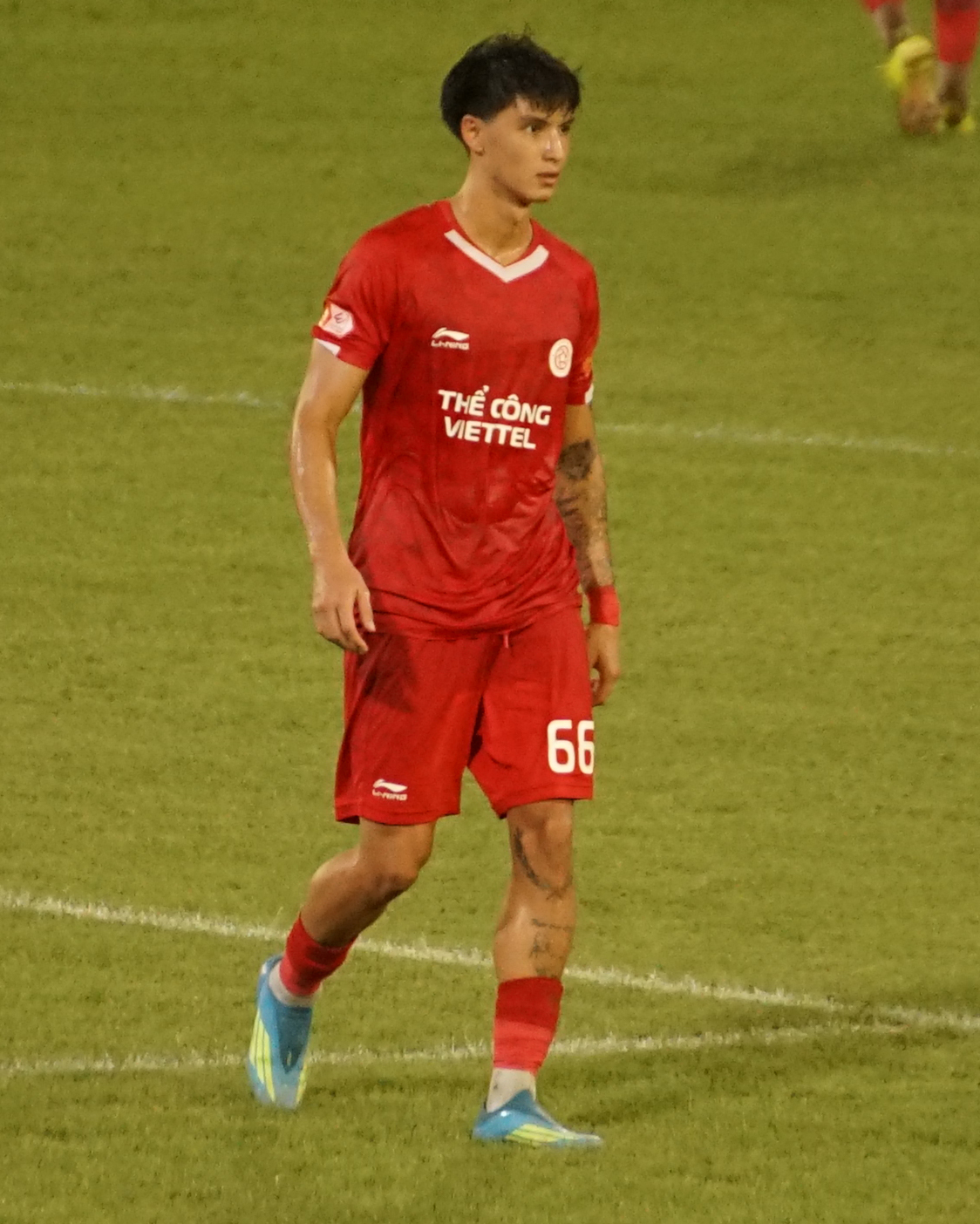
- Vu Thanh with The Cong–Viettel in 2026

Personal information
- Full name: Damian Vu Thanh An
- Date of birth: 25 August 2003 (age 23)
- Place of birth: Poland
- Height: 1.83 m (6 ft 0 in)
- Position: Midfielder

Team information
- Current team: The Cong–Viettel
- Number: 66

Youth career
- –2016: Gwardia Koszalin
- 2016–2017: Olimpia Grudziądz
- 2017–2018: Gwardia Koszalin
- 2018–2022: Olimpia Grudziądz

Senior career*
Years	Team	Apps	(Gls)
2022–2025	Olimpia Grudziądz	40	(2)
2024–2025	→ Stal Brzeg (loan)	11	(1)
2025–	The Cong–Viettel	9	(1)
- * Club domestic league appearances and goals as of 7 June 2026

Damian Vu Thanh An (born 25 August 2003) is a Polish professional footballer who plays as a midfielder for V.League 1 club The Cong–Viettel.

== Early life ==
Vu Thanh was born in Poland to a Vietnamese father and a Polish mother.

== Career ==
Vu Thanh started his career with Olimpia Grudziądz, where he made 40 league appearances and scored two goals and helped the club achieve promotion from the fourth tier to the third tier from the 2022–23 season.

During the summer of 2024, Vu Thanh was sent on loan to Stal Brzeg in the III liga, where he made 11 league appearances and scored one goal. Following his stint there, he signed for Vietnamese side The Cong–Viettel ahead of the 2025–26 V.League 1. He scored in his debut for The Cong–Viettel in the team's 3–0 win over Cong An Ho Chi Minh City on 22 August 2025.

== Style of play ==
Vu Thanh plays as a midfielder. Vietnamese newspaper Dân Việt wrote in 2025 that his "forte is the defensive midfielder position, but he can also play well as a center back when necessary... [he] impresses with his muscular physique... along with his strong one-on-one ability and impressive pressing power... he also stands out for his interception skills, reading situations, breaking up the opponent's play and his ability to pass the ball well".

== Honours ==
Olimpia Grudziądz

- III liga, group III: 2022–23
