= Lawrence Caruso =

Australian soccer player

Personal information
- Full name: Lawrence Robbie Caruso
- Date of birth: 15 September 2004 (age 22)
- Place of birth: Melbourne, Australia
- Height: 1.84 m (6 ft 0 in)
- Position: Goalkeeper

Team information
- Current team: The Cong–Viettel
- Number: 1

Youth career
- 2010–2017: Whittlesea Ranges
- 2017–2021: Melbourne City
- 2021: Dandenong City
- 2021–2022: Central Coast Mariners
- 2022–2024: Western Sydney Wanderers

Senior career*
Years	Team	Apps	(Gls)
2021–2022	Central Coast Mariners	1	(0)
2022	CCM Academy	15	(0)
2023	Western Sydney Wanderers NPL	20	(0)
2024–2025	Green Gully	2	(0)
2026–	The Cong–Viettel	0	(0)
- * Club domestic league appearances and goals as of 5 January 2025

Lawrence Robbie Caruso (born 15 September 2004), is an Australian professional footballer who plays as a goalkeeper for V.League 1 club The Cong–Viettel.

== Playing career ==
=== Club ===
Caruso was first called up to the Central Coast Mariners' A-League Men squad aged 17, for a game against Macarthur on 5 December 2021, following a suspension to regular goalkeeper Mark Birighitti. Starting on the bench, Caruso was substituted on after only 20 minutes when Birighitti's replacement, Yaren Sözer, was injured. The Mariners lost 1–0, following a deflected own goal from Oliver Bozanic.

Caruso joined National Premier Leagues Victoria club Green Gully on 25 October 2024.

On 10 August 2026, Caruso signed for V.League 1 side The Cong–Viettel.

== Personal life ==
Caruso was born in Melbourne to a father of Italian descent and a Vietnamese mother.
