= Bùi Văn Đức =

Vietnamese footballer (born 1997)

Personal information
- Full name: Bùi Văn Đức
- Date of birth: 15 March 1997 (age 29)
- Place of birth: Lạc Sơn, Hòa Bình, Vietnam
- Height: 1.74 m (5 ft 9 in)
- Positions: Left winger; left-back

Team information
- Current team: Hồng Lĩnh Hà Tĩnh
- Number: 26

Youth career
- 2012–2016: Công An Nhân Dân
- 2017–2018: → Sông Lam Nghệ An (loan)

Senior career*
Years	Team	Apps	(Gls)
2016–2018	Công An Nhân Dân	30	(1)
2019–2020	Bà Rịa-Vũng Tàu	20	(3)
2021–2022	Hồ Chí Minh City	16	(0)
2023–2024	Hồng Lĩnh Hà Tĩnh	45	(1)
2024–2026	Thể Công-Viettel	18	(0)
2026–	Hồng Lĩnh Hà Tĩnh	2	(0)
- * Club domestic league appearances and goals as of 11 October 2026

Bùi Văn Đức (born 15 March 1997) is a Vietnamese professional footballer who plays as a left winger or left-back for V.League 1 club Hồng Lĩnh Hà Tĩnh.

== Club career ==
Born in Hòa Bình from a family of Muong ethnicity, Văn Đức was formed in the Công An Nhân Dân youth academy. He was promoted to the first team in 2016 and took part in his team's promotion to the 2018 V.League 2.

In 2019, he joined Bà Rịa-Vũng Tàu and won the 2019 Vietnamese Second Division. In 2020, he played a crucial role helping his team finish as runners-up in the V.League 2 and was eventually named as the team's best player of the season.

In January 2021, Văn Đức joined V.League 1 team Hồ Chí Minh City, signing a five-year contract. However, he was released by the team at the end of the 2022 season.

In 2023, Văn Đức signed for Hồng Lĩnh Hà Tĩnh. His consistent good form throughout the 2023 season gained him a spot in the Team of the Season.

In August 2024, Thể Công-Viettel announced the signature of Văn Đức.

In June 2026, after his contract with Thể Công-Viettel ended, Văn Đức returned to Hồng Lĩnh Hà Tĩnh.

== International career ==
In June 2023, Văn Đức received his first call up to the Vietnam national football team to prepare for the friendly matches against Hong Kong and Syria.

== Honours ==
Bà Rịa-Vũng Tàu

- Vietnamese Second Division: 2019

Individual

- V.League 1 Team of the Season: 2023
