= Thể Công–Viettel FC =

Vietnamese football club

Thể Công–Viettel
- Full name: Câu lạc bộ bóng đá Thể Công – Viettel (Thể Công–Viettel Football Club)
- Nicknames: Cơn lốc đỏ (The Red Tornado); Đội bóng áo lính (The Soldiers)
- Short name: TCVT
- Founded: 23 September 1954; 72 years ago
- Ground: Mỹ Đình Stadium
- Capacity: 40,200
- Owner: Viettel Sports Co. Ltd
- Chairman: Đỗ Mạnh Dũng
- Head coach: Guilherme Almeida
- League: V.League 1
- 2025–26: V.League 1, 2nd of 14
- Website: viettelsports.vn
Home colours	Away colours

Thể Công–Viettel Football Club (Vietnamese pronunciation: [tʰe˧˩ kəwŋ͡m˧˧-], Vietnamese: Câu lạc bộ Bóng đá Thể Công – Viettel), commonly and formerly known as Thể Công and Viettel FC, is a Vietnamese professional football club based in Hanoi. The club is formally operated by Viettel Sports Center – an affiliation of Viettel Group – and competes in the V.League 1, the top tier of the Vietnamese football league system.

Thể Công–Viettel is the modern incarnation of Thể Công, a historically prominent club in Vietnamese football. The club won 9 North Vietnam national titles before Vietnam's reunification and 6 V.League 1 titles. Those titles make Thể Công one of the greatest football club in Vietnam's history. It has also produced a number of players who went on to represent the Vietnamese national team.

Thể Công–Viettel's traditional colour is red, leading to the nickname Cơn lốc đỏ (Red Tornado). As Thể Công, they held a long-standing rivalry with Công An Hà Nội, known as the "Capital derby" or the "Armed Forces derby". From the 2010s, Thể Công–Viettel developed a new rivalry with 2006 established team Hà Nội FC.

== History ==
=== Thể Công period ===
==== 1954–1968: Formation and rising ====
On 23 September 1954, according to the appointment of the Director of the General Department of Politics at that time, General Nguyễn Chí Thanh, Đoàn công tác Thể dục Thể thao Quân đội (Thể Công) was established. Thể Công is short for Thể dục Thể thao Công tác Đội (Physical Education and Sports Team Work) and was managed by Ministry of Defence.

The first Thể Công team include 23 people of the cadre from The Army Officer College No1 and was divided into three teams: 11 football, 5 basketball and 6 volleyball players. In addition, all three teams also have a special reserve player, Lý Đức Kim, who knows how to play football, both basketball and volleyball, and has the ability to be a nurse and good logistics. Kim also has the above support functions.

The first main lineup of the Thể Công football team include: Lê Nhâm; Nguyễn Văn Hiếu; Phạm Ngọc Quế; Nguyễn Thiêm; Ngô Xuân Quýnh; Phạm Mạnh Soạn; Trương Vĩnh Thắng; Nguyễn Bá Khánh; Nguyễn Văn Bưởi (captain); Nguyễn Thông (player-coach); Vũ Tâm (as Phạm Vinh). Beside, Nguyễn Văn Thành (as Tí Bồ) was joined later, was a famous player of the first Vietnamese footballers generation in the 1930s to 1950s period.

More than a month later, on 25 October, in the first football match held since the liberation of Hanoi at Hàng Đẫy Stadium, Thể Công had the first match in its history against Trần Hưng Đạo University team, including players from the capital's working class. The team won with a score of 1–0 with the only goal of the match being scored in the 30th minute by the striker captain Nguyễn Văn Bưởi.

In 1955, Vietnam's first football tournament was held in Haiphong with the name Hoà Bình League. Thể Công participated with both their main and reserves team and both teams won championships of two A and B classes.

In 1956, for the first time, the North Vietnam national football team was convened for international duty. At the age of 38, Tí Bồ was still called to the national team along with nine other Thể Công players to participate in his first tour in China. He became one of the first players of the Vietnamese team and the oldest Vietnamese national player ever.

During the following years, Thể Công won the North Vietnam Class A League in 1956 and 1958. At that time, Công An Hải Phòng and Công An Hà Nội has been their main and traditional rival in Northern Vietnam football. Three clubs played are also the founding members in the highest Vietnamese system league in the mid-1950s and became the Big 3 clubs in the early Vietnam football period. The duel between Thể Công and Công An Hải Phòng was referred to as the Northern Derby, but the Hanoi Derby with Công An Hà Nội was more attention because they are always counter Thể Công by their good defense system.

In 1965, the Military Sports Unit was dissolved due to the impact of American bombings in North Vietnam, leaving Thể Công facing the risk of dissolution. Thanks to the assistance of General Bằng Giang, Thể Công was allowed to continue its operations under the auspices of the Army Officers' School for a period of five years, thus competed until 1970 under the name Trường Sĩ Quan Lục Quân.

==== 1970–2000: Golden decade and dominance in the league ====
In the 1960s and 1970s, Thể Công dominated the North Vietnam Football Championship with eight consecutive titles from 1971 to 1978. During that time, the typical generation of Thể Công players were Nguyễn Thế Anh (Ba Đẻn), Nguyễn Cao Cường, Quản Trọng Hùng, Vương Tiến Dũng, Nguyễn Trọng Giáp, Vũ Mạnh Hải,... with the majority being young players who went to long-term training in North Korea in 1967 and when they returned home, they were the most outstanding and typical players in the country.

After the country was unified, the Vietnamese National Championship was launched. Thể Công remained one of the strongest football clubs in Vietnam, winning 5 national titles during the 1980s and 1990s. Thể Công players have often been the core of the national team and contributed many players in the golden age of Vietnamese football, including goalkeeper Trần Tiến Anh, Đỗ Mạnh Dũng, Nguyễn Mạnh Cường, Nguyễn Hồng Sơn, Trương Việt Hoàng, Nguyễn Đức Thắng, Phạm Như Thuần, Triệu Quang Hà, Đặng Phương Nam, and Vũ Công Tuyền. Thể Công was one of the longest standing teams in the V.League until the team was relegated in 2004.

==== 2004–2008: Relegation and promoted back ====
In 2004, exactly 50 years after its foundation, Thể Công finished 11th out of 12 in the 2004 V-League and was relegated to the lower division. The team performed poorly partly due to the policy of not recruiting foreign players, in contrast to all other teams in the league at that time. In the following season, the club changed its name to Thể Công Viettel, (Viettel is the Army Electronics and Telecommunication Corporation) and is partially managed by this unit. However, many comments suggested that the club should return to its old name.

On 19 January 2007, the club gained their promototion back to V-League after winning over Tây Ninh 5–3 in the promotion play-offs. Immediately thereafter, the official team name was reversed back to Thể Công.

==== 2009–2010: Transfer from General Political Department to Viettel Group ====
On 22 September 2009 (before the 55th anniversary of the establishment of Thể Công) the Ministry of Defence changed Thể Công's name to Viettel. In November 2009, the Ministry of Defence decided to expropriate the "Thể Công" brand and transfer all management of football club from the General Political Department of the Vietnam People's Army to Viettel Group. On 7 November 2009, under an agreement with the leadership of Thanh Hóa province, Viettel Group transferred the participation slot of Viettel FC to the Department of Culture, Sports and Tourism of Thanh Hóa Province. After acquiring Viettel’s slot, the Thanh Hóa FC was renamed to "Viettel–Thanh Hóa FC". However, two months after, the club changed its name to "Lam Sơn Thanh Hóa FC" as Viettel sold its V.League playing slot to Thanh Hóa for 80 billion VND, retaining only its reserve team, which competed in the 2010 Vietnamese National Football First League. At the end of the 2010 season, Viettel also sold their First League slot to the T&T Youth Football Training Centre, with the team renamed "Hà Nội FC" the predecessor of what later became Sài Gòn FC.

On 23 September 2011, during the 57th anniversary of the establishment of the club, hundreds of officials, former players, and fans of all generations who were once members of Thể Công decided to launch a campaign to collect 1 million signatures across the country to petition the Ministry of Defense to regain the title Thể Công. However, Viettel Telecom Corporation was not interested in this reception. Facing the risk of being dissolved, the acting director of the Viettel Training Center Nguyễn Thanh Hải had asked the leaders of Viettel Telecom Corporation to allow the maintenance of the football academy and pledged to bring results in a year. In the 2010 football season, the academy's youth teams reached the final round of the youth tournaments. In the following year, the team's youth categories won 1 Gold, 1 Silver and 1 Bronze Medal in youth tournaments, officially gaining the right to exist. In 2012, Viettel re-entered the Vietnamese football system from the Third Division. The team placed first in their group and promoted to the Second Division.

=== Viettel period and revival ===
==== 2010–2018: Promotion ====
Following the promotion to the Second Division for the 2013 season, the club's strategy focused on youth development, aiming for long term success. The club played in the Second Division for 3 seasons, before topping their group in the 2015 season and gained the promotion to V.League 2 after defeating Cà Mau in the promotion play-offs. The club finally returned to professional football in the 2016 season four years after the rebuilding.

In 2018, Viettel won the V.League 2 and made their comeback to the national top tier V.League 1. The football club also wanted to switch back to the formerly name Thể Công when the tournament started from 2019, but was not agreed yet from the Ministry of Defence, who owned brands name "Thể Công". Therefore, the official name of the team remained Viettel Football Club, owned by Viettel Group.

==== 2019–present: revival ====
In the 2020 season, in their second season at the V.League 1 after their promotion, Viettel had a title race in the league with same city rival Hanoi FC. Despite being placed behind Hanoi FC during the first part of the season, Viettel came back in the second half of the season and climbed to the first place after the 15th matchday. They ended up securing their first place and won the championship after beating Saigon FC 1–0 with Bruno Cantanhede's only goal in the last matchday that took place in November 2020. However, in the 2020 Vietnamese Cup, the club finished as runner-up after losing 1–2 against Hanoi FC in the final. It took them only two seasons in V.League 1 to be crowned as champions after they were promoted from the 2019 season. If including the achievements of the former Thể Công, this was the 9th time that they have won the national league after the reunification of Vietnam. It is also the 19th national title of the club. The title also qualified the club for the AFC Champions League.

== Name history ==
- 1954–1965: Thể Công
- 1965–1970: Trường Sĩ Quan Lục Quân
- 1970–1975: Thể Công
- 1976–1998: Quân Đội
- 1999–2005: Thể Công
- 2005–2007: Thể Công–Viettel
- 2007–2009: Thể Công
- 2010–2023: Viettel
- 2023–present: Thể Công–Viettel

== Kit suppliers and shirt sponsors ==
Period	Kit manufacturer	Shirt sponsor
2017	(England) Mitre	BankPlus
2019	(Vietnam) VNA Sports	Viettel 4G; Vietel Pay
2020–2022	(Thailand) FBT	Viettel
2022–present	(China) Li-Ning	Viettel Money; Bamboo Airways; MB Bank Viettel TV360

== Stadium ==
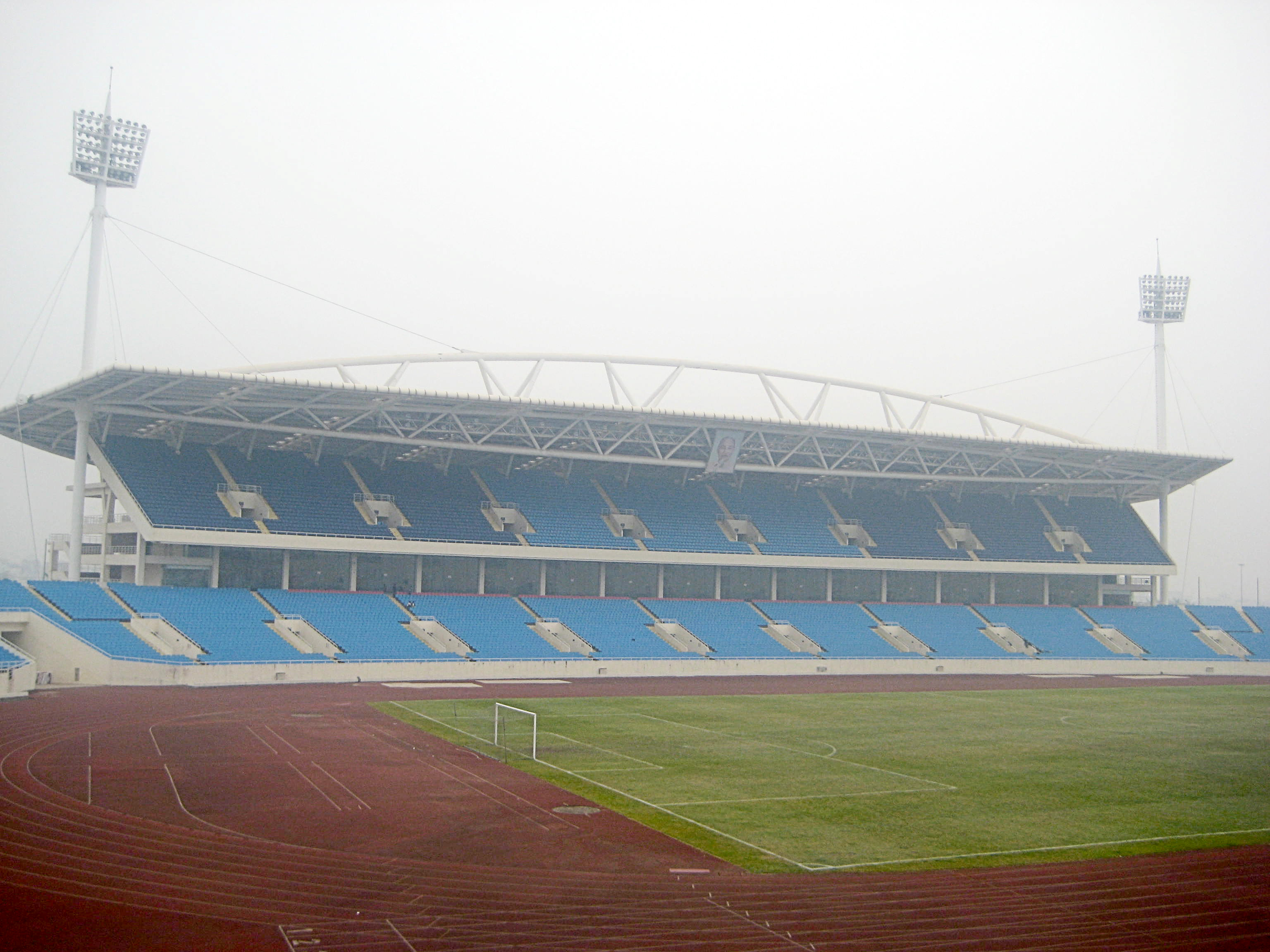
View of the Mỹ Đình National Stadium.

Thể Công–Viettel had several home stadiums throughout their history. From their creation in 1956 until 1998, Thể Công had the 6,000-capacity Cột Cờ Stadium as its home ground. The stadium was built in the 1940s by the French colonial authorities and was known as the Mangin Stadium. It located within the Imperial Citadel of Thăng Long. The stadium changed its name to Cột Cờ Stadium following the Việt Minh's takeover of Hanoi in 1954 and was placed under the control of the Ministry of National Defence. With the downgrade of Cột Cờ in the 1990s, Thể Công moved to the larger Hàng Đẫy Stadium, and used Cột Cờ as their training ground. In 2004, the Ministry of National Defence decided to discontinue the use of Cột Cờ Stadium for sporting activities, and transferred its management to other military units.

Since the 2025–26 season, Thể Công–Viettel adopted Mỹ Đình National Stadium as their home ground. In 2026, the management of the entire complex of Mỹ Đình National Stadium was transferred to the Ministry of National Defence on October 1st.

== Rivalries ==
=== Công An Hà Nội ===
In the 20th century, the derby between the Công An Hà Nội and Thể Công was one of the biggest derby games in Vietnam. The two teams were established in Hanoi and both represented the people's armed forces with Công An Hà Nội representing the police, while Thể Công represents the army. Both teams were prominent forces of the Northern Vietnamese football and was the confrontation between many football stars of the country.

On 14 February 2023, Viettel defeated Công An Hà Nội 2–1 in third matchday of the 2023 V.League 1 at Hàng Đẫy. This was the first official encounter between the two teams at the top-flight after 21 years.

=== Hà Nội ===
Hà Nội was established in 2006 and quickly rose as a new force in Vietnamese football. The two teams first met officially during the 2008 Vietnamese Cup, before facing each other in V.League 1 for the first time in 2009. With the resurgence and rise of Viettel, the Hanoi Derby in 2020 was particularly tense, featuring two red cards, one for each team. They have faced each other 23 times in their history, with Hanoi FC dominating Thể Công-Viettel with 10 wins, 6 draws and 7 losses.

== Records and statistics ==
=== Continental record ===
Season	Competition	Round	Club	Home	Away	Aggregate
1999–2000	Asian Club Championship	First round	(Hong Kong) Happy Valley AA	Walkover		
1999–2000	Asian Club Championship	Second round	(South Korea) Suwon Samsung Bluewings	1–1	0–6	1–7
2021	AFC Champions League	Group F	(South Korea) Ulsan Hyundai	0–1	0–3	3rd
2021	AFC Champions League	Group F	(Philippines) Kaya–Iloilo	1–0	5–0	3rd
2021	AFC Champions League	Group F	(Thailand) BG Pathum United	1–3	0–2	3rd
2022	AFC Cup	Group I	(Laos) Young Elephants	5–1		1st
2022	AFC Cup	Group I	(Cambodia) Phnom Penh Crown	1–0		1st
2022	AFC Cup	Group I	(Singapore) Hougang United	5–2		1st
2022	AFC Cup	Zonal semi-finals	(Malaysia) Kuala Lumpur City	0–0 (a.e.t.) (5–6 p)		
2026–27	AFC Champions League Two	Group E	(Australia) Melbourne Victory	1–1		
2026–27	AFC Champions League Two	Group E	(Indonesia) Persib Bandung		0–1	
2026–27	AFC Champions League Two	Group E	(South Korea) FC Seoul	0–5	0–3	

=== Season-by-season domestic record ===
Season	Pld	Won	Draw	Lost	GF	GA	GD	PTS	Final position	Notes
1981–82 V-League	19	14	2	3	33	15	+18	30	Champions	
1982–83 V-League	23	17	3	3	49	22	+27	37	Champions	
1984 V-League	16	7	5	4	30	18	+12	19	2nd	
1985 V-League	15	9	3	3	28	20	+8	21	4th	
1986 V-League	17	11	4	2	19	10	+9	26	2nd	
1987–88 V-League	26	13	8	5	40	20	+20	47	Champions	
1989 V-League	7	4	2	1	9	3	+6	16	2nd	
1990 V-League									Champions	
1991 V-League	10	3	5	2	11	9	+2	9		
1992 V-League	11				15	8	+7		3rd	
1993–94 V-League									3rd	
1995 V-League									9th	
1996 V-League	13	3	4	6	9	20	−11	13	9th	
1997 V-League	7	3	3	1	9	6	+3	12	4th	
1998 V-League									Champions	
1999–2000 V-League	24	7	9	8	27	28	−1	30	10th	
2000–01 V-League	18	8	5	5	19	16	+3	29	3rd	
2001–02 V-League	18	6	5	7	16	16	0	23	7th	
2003 V-League	22	9	5	8	28	27	+1	32	6th	
2004 V-League	22	5	5	12	20	39	−19	20	11th	Relegation to 2005 V.League 2
2005 V.League 2	22	7	4	10	21	31	−10	31	6th	
2006 V.League 2	26	10	8	8	31	30	+1	38	4th	
2007 V.League 2	26	15	7	4	47	20	+27	52	1st	Promoted to 2008 V-League
2008 V-League	26	10	8	8	28	28	+0	38	8th	
2009 V-League	26	10	5	11	40	46	−6	35	9th	
2010 Vietnamese National Football First League	24	7	6	11	36	43	−7	27	9th	
2016 V.League 2	18	8	8	2	31	12	+19	32	2nd	
2017 V.League 2	12	4	6	2	15	9	+6	18	4th	
2018 V.League 2	18	13	2	3	37	15	+22	41	1st	Promoted to 2019 V.League 1
2019 V.League 1	26	11	3	12	33	40	−7	36	6th	
2020 V.League 1	20	12	5	3	29	16	+13	41	Champions	Qualification for 2021 AFC Champions League Group stage
2021 V.League 1	12	8	2	2	16	9	+7	18	2nd	Qualification for 2022 AFC Cup Group stage
2022 V.League 1	24	11	6	7	29	14	+15	39	4th	
2023 V.League 1	20	8	8	4	23	17	+6	32	3rd	
2023–24 V.League 1	26	10	8	8	29	28	+1	38	5th	
2024–25 V.League 1	26	12	8	6	43	29	+14	44	4th	
2025–26 V.League 1	26	15	9	2	39	21	+18	54	2nd	Qualification for 2026–27 AFC Champions League Two Group stage
2026–27 V.League 1 (season)

== Honours ==
=== National competitions ===
League

- A1 National League/V.League 1

(gold) Winners (6; record): 1981–82, 1982–83, 1987, 1990, 1998, 2020
(silver) Runners-up : (4) 1984, 1989, 1986, 2025–26
(bronze) Third place : (4) 1993–94, 1997, 2000–01, 2023

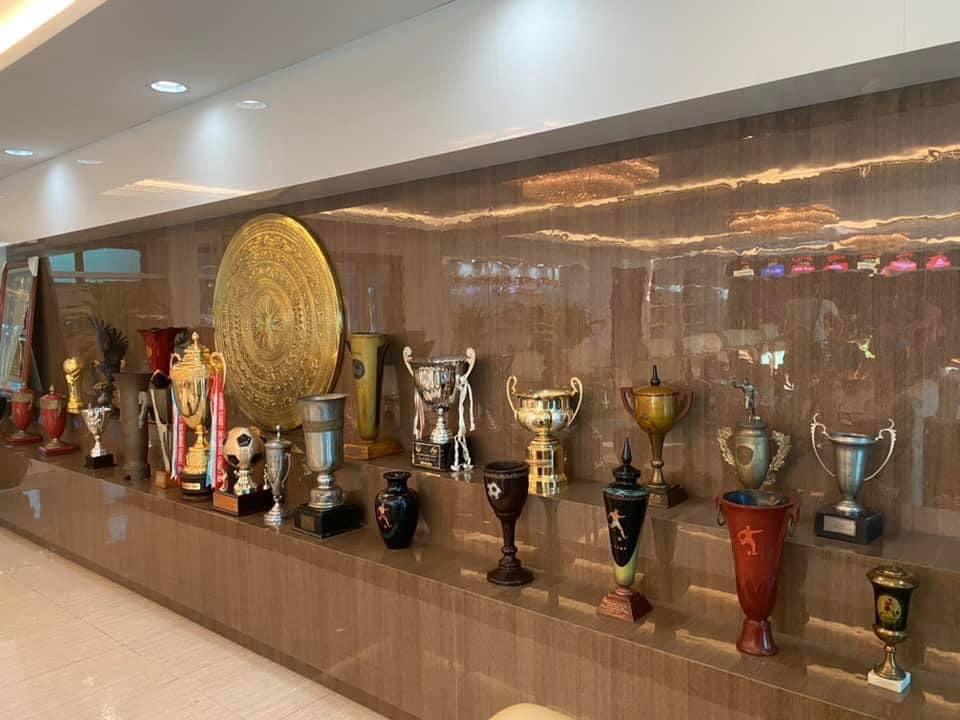
Thể Công–Viettel trophy cabinet

- V.League 2:

(gold) Winners : (2) 2007, 2018
(silver) Runners-up : (1) 2016

- Second League:

(gold) Winners : 2015
(silver) Runners-up : 2009

- Third League

(gold) Winners : 2012

- Vietnamese Cup:

(silver) Runners-up : (5) 1992, 2004, 2009, 2020, 2023
(bronze) Third place (3) : 2023–24, 2024–25, 2025–26

- Vietnamese Super Cup:

(gold) Winners : (1) 1999
(silver) Runners-up : (1) 2020

=== Other competitions ===
- North Vietnam Football Championship:

(gold) Winners (9; record): 1955, 1956, 1958, 1967, 1971, 1972, 1973, 1974, 1975

- Hồng Hà League:

(gold) Winners (3; record): 1976, 1977, 1978

- Festival Sport Vietnam

(gold) Winners : 2002

- Army ASEAN (1)

(gold) Winners : 2004
(silver) Runners-up : 1999

- SKDA

(bronze) Third place : (1) 1989

== Players ==
=== First-team squad ===
As of 25 August 2026

Note: Flags indicate national team as defined under FIFA eligibility rules; some limited exceptions apply. Players may hold more than one non-FIFA nationality.

No.	Pos.	Nation	Player
1	GK	AUS	Lawrence Caruso
2	DF	VIE	Lương Chí Khải
3	DF	VIE	Nguyễn Thanh Bình
4	DF	VIE	Bùi Tiến Dũng (captain)
5	MF	BRA	André Luiz
6	FW	VIE	Trần Danh Trung
7	MF	BRA	Wesley Natã
8	MF	VIE	Nguyễn Hữu Thắng
9	FW	BRA	Ribamar
10	FW	BRA	Hernandes Rodrigues
11	MF	VIE	Khuất Văn Khang
12	DF	VIE	Phan Tuấn Tài
13	FW	JAM	Rimario Gordon
14	MF	BRA	Paulinho Curuá
15	DF	BRA	Lucas Alves
16	DF	VIE	Phạm Trung Hiếu

No.	Pos.	Nation	Player
17	MF	VIE	Nguyễn Đức Hoàng Minh
18	DF	VIE	Đinh Viết Tú
19	MF	VIE	Đinh Xuân Tiến
20	DF	VIE	Đào Văn Nam
22	MF	VIE	Nguyễn Hoàng Khanh
23	FW	VIE	Nhâm Mạnh Dũng
28	GK	VIE	Nguyễn Văn Việt (on loan from Sông Lam Nghệ An)
33	GK	VIE	Phí Minh Long
34	MF	VIE	Doãn Ngọc Tân
66	MF	POL	Damian Vu Thanh
83	MF	VIE	Hoàng Văn Thái
86	MF	VIE	Nguyễn Hữu Nam
88	MF	VIE	Nguyễn Văn Tú
89	MF	VIE	Lê Quốc Nhật Nam
95	FW	BRA	Júnior Brandão
97	MF	VIE	Triệu Việt Hưng

=== Other players under contract ===
Note: Flags indicate national team as defined under FIFA eligibility rules; some limited exceptions apply. Players may hold more than one non-FIFA nationality.

No.	Pos.	Nation	Player
—	GK	VIE	Trần Đức Duy
—	MF	VIE	Đỗ Văn Chí
—	MF	VIE	Nguyễn Đình Đức

No.	Pos.	Nation	Player
—	FW	VIE	Nguyễn Hữu Tiệp
—	FW	VIE	Vũ Bá Hải Dương

=== Out on loan ===
Note: Flags indicate national team as defined under FIFA eligibility rules; some limited exceptions apply. Players may hold more than one non-FIFA nationality.

No.	Pos.	Nation	Player
6	MF	VIE	Nguyễn Công Phương (to Hải Phòng until 1 July 2027)
15	DF	VIE	Đặng Tuấn Phong (to Hải Phòng until 1 July 2027)
31	DF	VIE	Nguyễn Hữu Thái Bảo (to Hải Phòng until 1 July 2027)
66	DF	VIE	Nguyễn Mạnh Hưng (to Hưng Yên until 1 July 2027)
77	MF	VIE	Nguyễn Ngọc Tú (to Hải Phòng until 1 July 2027)
79	FW	VIE	Nguyễn Đăng Dương (to Hưng Yên until 1 July 2027)
—	GK	VIE	Đoàn Huy Hoàng (to Bắc Ninh until 1 July 2027)

No.	Pos.	Nation	Player
—	DF	VIE	Tiêu Trung Hiếu (to Hưng Yên until 1 July 2027)
—	DF	VIE	Vũ Quốc Anh (to Hải Phòng until 1 July 2027)
—	DF	VIE	Đặng Thanh Bình (to Huế until 1 July 2027)
—	MF	VIE	Vũ Tùng Dương (to Huế until 1 July 2027)
—	FW	VIE	Hoàng Công Hậu (to Huế until 1 July 2027)
—	FW	VIE	Nguyễn Hữu Tuấn (to Huế until 1 July 2027)

== Famous players ==
- Ba Đẻn
- Bùi Tiến Dũng
- Đặng Phương Nam
- Đinh Thế Nam
- Đỗ Mạnh Dũng
- Đỗ Văn Phúc
- Khuất Văn Khang
- Lê Phước Tứ
- Ngô Xuân Quýnh
- Nhâm Mạnh Dũng
- Nguyễn Cao Cường
- Nguyễn Công Phương
- Nguyễn Đức Chiến
- Nguyễn Đức Thắng
- Nguyễn Hoàng Đức
- Nguyễn Hồng Sơn
- Nguyễn Huy Hùng
- Nguyễn Mạnh Cường
- Nguyễn Mạnh Dũng
- Nguyễn Thanh Bình
- Nguyễn Trọng Giáp
- Nguyễn Trọng Hoàng
- Nguyễn Văn Quyết
- Nguyễn Văn Vinh
- Phạm Như Thuần
- Phan Tuấn Tài
- Phan Văn Mỵ
- Quế Ngọc Hải
- Quản Trọng Hùng
- Thạch Bảo Khanh
- Tí Bồ
- Trần Nguyên Mạnh
- Trần Văn Khánh
- Trần Văn Thành
- Triệu Quang Hà
- Trương Tiến Anh
- Trương Việt Hoàng
- Văn Sỹ Chi
- Vũ Công Tuyền
- Vũ Như Thành
- Vương Tiến Dũng

== Coaching staff ==
Position	Name
Technical director	(Vietnam) Thạch Bảo Khanh
Head coach	(Brazil) Guilherme Almeida (caretaker)
Assistant coach	(Vietnam) Ngô Tiến Dũng (Vietnam) Nguyễn Văn Biển (Vietnam) Phan Bá Hùng
Goalkeeper coach	Vacant
Fitness coach	(Brazil) Wagner Ellwanger
Technical analyst	(Vietnam) Nguyễn Huy Toàn
Doctor	(South Korea) Kim Kwang-jae
Physiotherapist	(Brazil) César Henrique (Vietnam) Nguyễn Văn Tỉnh (Vietnam) Phạm Văn Tĩnh

== Managerial history ==
Name	Period	Honours
(Vietnam) Vương Tiến Dũng	1998–2000	1998 V-League; 1999 Vietnamese Super Cup
(Vietnam) Quản Trọng Hùng	2000–2003	
(Serbia and Montenegro) Branko Radović	2003	
(Vietnam) Phan Văn Mỵ	2003–2004	
(Vietnam) Nguyễn Thanh Hải	2004–2005	
(Vietnam) Nguyễn Mạnh Cường	2005–2006	
(Vietnam) Nguyễn Cao Cường	2006	
(Hungary) Tamás Viczkó	2006–2007	2007 Vietnamese First Division
(Hungary) György Gálhidi	2007–2008	
(Vietnam) Vương Tiến Dũng	2008–2009	
(Vietnam) Lê Thụy Hải	2009	
(Vietnam) Nguyễn Mạnh Cường	2009–2010	
(Vietnam) Đỗ Mạnh Dũng	2010	
(Vietnam) Đặng Phương Nam	2012–2014	
(Vietnam) Đinh Thế Nam	2015–2016	
(Vietnam) Nguyễn Hải Biên	2017–2019	2018 V.League 2
(South Korea) Lee Heung-sil	2019	
(Vietnam) Nguyễn Hải Biên	2019–2020	
(Vietnam) Trương Việt Hoàng	2020–2022	2020 V.League 1
(Germany) Hans-Jürgen Gede (caretaker)	2021	
(South Korea) Bae Ji-won	2020–2022	
(Vietnam) Thạch Bảo Khanh	2022–2023	
(United States) Thomas Dooley (caretaker)	2023–2024	
(Vietnam) Nguyễn Đức Thắng	2024–2025	
(Bulgaria) Velizar Popov	2025–2026	
(Brazil) Guilherme Almeida (caretaker)	2026–present	
