= Phan Tuấn Tài =

Vietnamese footballer

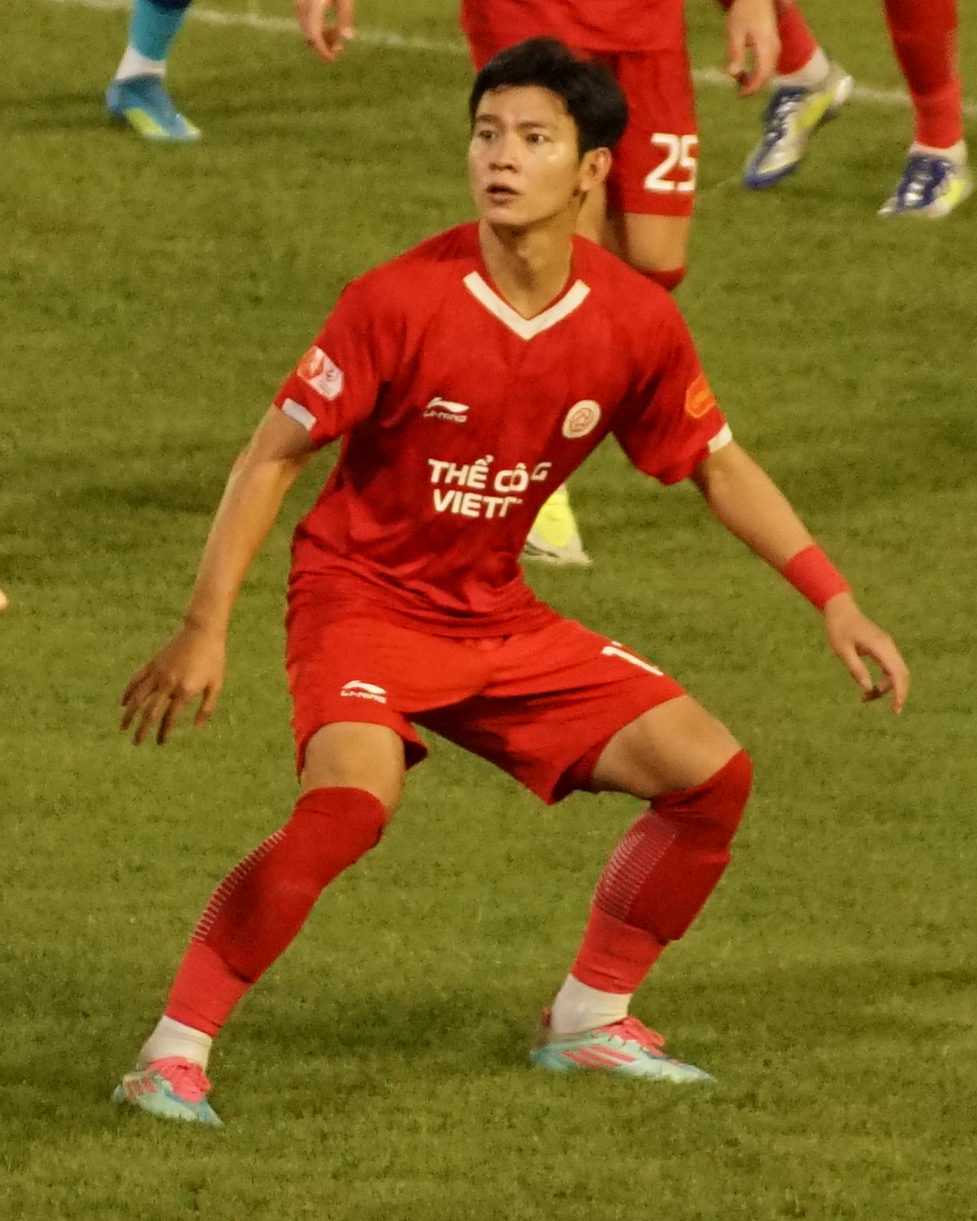
- Tuấn Tài in 2026

Personal information
- Full name: Phan Tuấn Tài
- Date of birth: 7 January 2001 (age 25)
- Place of birth: Buôn Ma Thuột, Đắk Lắk, Vietnam
- Height: 1.76 m (5 ft 9 in)
- Position: Left-back

Team information
- Current team: Thể Công–Viettel
- Number: 12

Youth career
- 2013–2020: Viettel

Senior career*
Years	Team	Apps	(Gls)
2021–	Thể Công–Viettel	111	(1)
2021–2022	→ Đắk Lắk (loan)	10	(0)

International career^{‡}
2019–2020	Vietnam U19	5	(0)
2022–2024	Vietnam U23	30	(1)
2022–	Vietnam	26	(0)
Medal record
Men's football
Representing Vietnam
AFF U-23 Championship
Winner	Cambodia 2022
SEA Games
Gold medal – first place	Football at the 2021 SEA Games – Men's tournament	Team
Bronze medal – third place	Phnom Penh 2023	Team
- * Club domestic league appearances and goals as of 20 November 2026 ‡ National team caps and goals as of 17 November 2026

Phan Tuấn Tài (born 7 January 2001) is a Vietnamese professional footballer who plays as a left-back for V.League 1 club Thể Công–Viettel and the Vietnam national team.

== Club career ==
In 2013, Tuấn Tài began his football career in Viettel's youth academy. In 2020, Tuấn Tài was sent on loan to V.League 2 club Đắk Lắk. He was the first U23 Vietnam player to be called back by his parent club and promoted to the first team. On 30 June 2022, Tuấn Tài was recalled back to Viettel. With this return, he was promoted to the first team to compete in the 2022 V.League 1.

== International career ==
Tuấn Tài was urgently included in Vietnam U23 squad for the 2022 AFF U-23 Championship due to several COVID-19 cases in the team. He started in the final match against Thailand U23 and managed to help his team keep a clean sheet in the 1–0 victory to win the tournament.

His performances at the 2022 AFF U-23 Championship gained him a spot in coach Park Hang-seo's 20 men squad for the 2021 Southeast Asian Games. In the gold medal match, Tuấn Tài assisted Nhâm Mạnh Dũng, who scored the winning goal against Thailand to help Vietnam winning their second Southeast Asian Games men's football gold medal in their history.

During the 2022 AFC U-23 Championship, Tuấn Tài had 1 goal and 1 assist, helping Vietnam reach the quarter-finals.

One day before the Vietnam U23 team departed for Qatar to compete in the 2024 AFC U-23 Asian Cup, Tuấn Tài withdrew from the tournament due to an injury.

== Career statistics ==
=== Club ===
As of match played 20 November 2026

Appearances and goals by club, season and competition
Club	Season	League			Cup		Continental		Other		Total	
Club	Season	Division	Apps	Goals	Apps	Goals	Apps	Goals	Apps	Goals	Apps	Goals
Đắk Lắk	2021	V.League 2	6	0	—		—		—		6	0
Đắk Lắk	2022	V.League 2	4	0	0	0	—		—		4	0
Đắk Lắk	Total		10	0	0	0	0	0	0	0	10	0
Thể Công–Viettel	2022	V.League 1	13	0	—		1 (Note: Appearances in AFC Champions League Two)	0	—		14	0
Thể Công–Viettel	2023	V.League 1	19	0	4	0	—		—		8	0
Thể Công–Viettel	2023–24	V.League 1	24	0	3	0	—		—		27	3
Thể Công–Viettel	2024–25	V.League 1	21	1	1	0	—		—		28	6
Thể Công–Viettel	2025–26	V.League 1	26	0	4	0	—		—		30	0
Thể Công–Viettel	2026–27	V.League 1	8	0	0	0	3	0	—		11	0
Thể Công–Viettel	Total		111	1	12	0	4	0	0	0	127	1
Total career			121	1	12	0	4	0	0	0	137	1

=== International ===
As of match played 26 August 2026

Appearances and goals by national team and year
National team	Year	Apps	Goals
Vietnam	2022	1	0
Vietnam	2023	7	0
Vietnam	2024	10	0
Vietnam	2024	4	0
Total		22	0

=== International goals ===
==== U-23 ====
#	Date	Venue	Opponent	Score	Result	Competition
1.	5 June 2022	Tashkent, Uzbekistan	Thailand	1–0	2–2	2022 AFC U-23 Asian Cup

== Honours ==
Vietnam U23

- AFF U-23 Championship: 2022
- SEA Games gold medal : 2021; bronze medal: 2023

Vietnam

- VFF Cup: 2022
- ASEAN Championship: 2026
