= Đinh Viết Tú =

Vietnamese footballer (born 1992)

Personal information
- Full name: Đinh Viết Tú
- Date of birth: 16 August 1992 (age 34)
- Place of birth: Nghĩa Hưng, Nam Định, Vietnam
- Height: 1.80 m (5 ft 11 in)
- Position: Full back

Team information
- Current team: Thể Công-Viettel
- Number: 18

Youth career
- 2009–2011: Nam Định

Senior career*
Years	Team	Apps	(Gls)
2011–2018	Nam Định	60	(2)
2018–2021	Quảng Nam	73	(1)
2022–2023	Nam Định	31	(1)
2023–2025	Đông Á Thanh Hóa	46	(0)
2025–	Thể Công-Viettel	21	(2)
- * Club domestic league appearances and goals as of 7 June 2026

Đinh Viết Tú (born 16 August 1992) is a Vietnamese professional footballer who plays as a full back for V.League 1 club Thể Công-Viettel.

== Honours ==
Nam Định

- V.League 2: 2017

Thanh Hóa

- Vietnamese Cup: 2023–24
