= Rimario Gordon =

Jamaican footballer (born 1994)

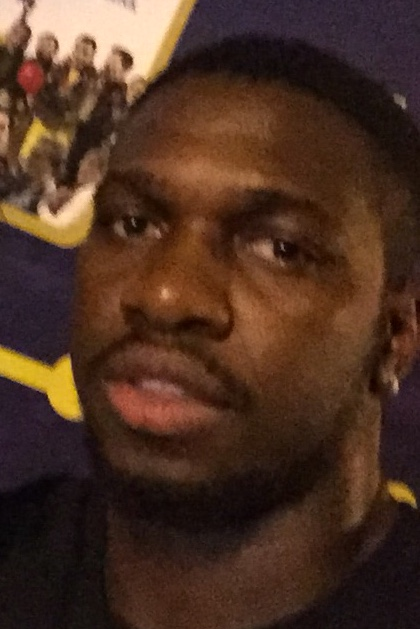
- Gordon in 2019

Personal information
- Full name: Rimario Allando Gordon
- Date of birth: 6 July 1994 (age 32)
- Place of birth: Denham Town, Jamaica
- Height: 1.80 m (5 ft 11 in)
- Position: Striker

Team information
- Current team: The Cong-Viettel
- Number: 13

Youth career
- 2008–2012: Alief Elsik High School

College career
Years	Team	Apps	(Gls)
2014–2015	Northeast Texas Eagles		
2015–2017	Marshall Thundering Herds		

Senior career*
Years	Team	Apps	(Gls)
2018	Hoang Anh Gia Lai	13	(0)
2018–2019	Thanh Hoa	28	(16)
2020	Hanoi FC	17	(12)
2021	Binh Dinh	11	(3)
2022	Haiphong	22	(17)
2023	Becamex Binh Duong	17	(7)
2023–2026	Dong A Thanh Hoa	41	(14)
2026–	The Cong-Viettel	0	(0)
- * Club domestic league appearances and goals as of 10 April 2026

Rimario Allando Gordon (born 6 July 1994) is a Jamaican professional footballer who plays as a striker for V.League 1 club The Cong-Viettel.

== Career ==
During his stint in the United States, before playing for Marshall University, Gordon made his mark playing for one of the top high school soccer teams, Alief Elsik High School Boys Soccer Team.

Rimario began his professional career in 2018 after signing for Vietnamese V.League 1 side Hoang Anh Gia Lai. He quit the team after 6 months, failing to score any league goal. Shortly after, he joined Thanh Hoa, where he emerged as one of the best goalscorers in the V.League 1. In the 2022 season, he finished as the league's top scorer with 17 goals for Haiphong.

On 6 August 2026, Rimario moved to The Cong-Viettel.

== Career statistics ==
As of match played 4 November 2026

Appearances and goals by club, season and competition
Club	Season	League			Cup		Other		Total	
Club	Season	Division	Apps	Goals	Apps	Goals	Apps	Goals	Apps	Goals
Hoang Anh Gia Lai	2018	V.League 1	13	0	3	2	—		16	2
Thanh Hoa	2018	V.League 1	8	8	3	2	—		11	10
Thanh Hoa	2019	V.League 1	20	8	1	0	—		21	8
Thanh Hoa	Total		28	16	4	2	0	0	32	18
Hanoi FC	2020	V.League 1	17	12	2	0	—		19	12
Binh Dinh	2021	V.League 1	11	3	—		—		11	3
Haiphong	2022	V.League 1	22	17	1	0	—		23	17
Becamex Binh Duong	2023	V.League 1	17	7	1	0	—		18	7
Dong A Thanh Hoa	2023–24	V.League 1	25	10	2	1	1 (Note: Appearance in Vietnamese Super Cup)	2	28	13
Dong A Thanh Hoa	2024–25	V.League 1	1	0	0	0	2 (Note: One appearance in Vietnamese Super Cup; one appearance and one goal in ASEAN Club Championship)	1	3	1
Dong A Thanh Hoa	2025–26	V.League 1	15	4	1	0	—		16	4
Dong A Thanh Hoa	Total		41	14	3	1	3	3	47	17
Thể Công-Viettel	2026–27	V.League 1	0	0	0	0	4 (Note: Appearances in AFC Champions League Two)	0	4	0
Total career			149	65	14	5	7	3	170	76

== Honours ==
Hanoi FC

- Vietnamese Cup: 2020

Dong A Thanh Hoa

- Vietnamese Cup: 2023–24
- Vietnamese Super Cup: 2023

Individual

- V.League 1 top scorer: 2022
