= Đào Văn Nam =

Vietnamese footballer (born 1996)

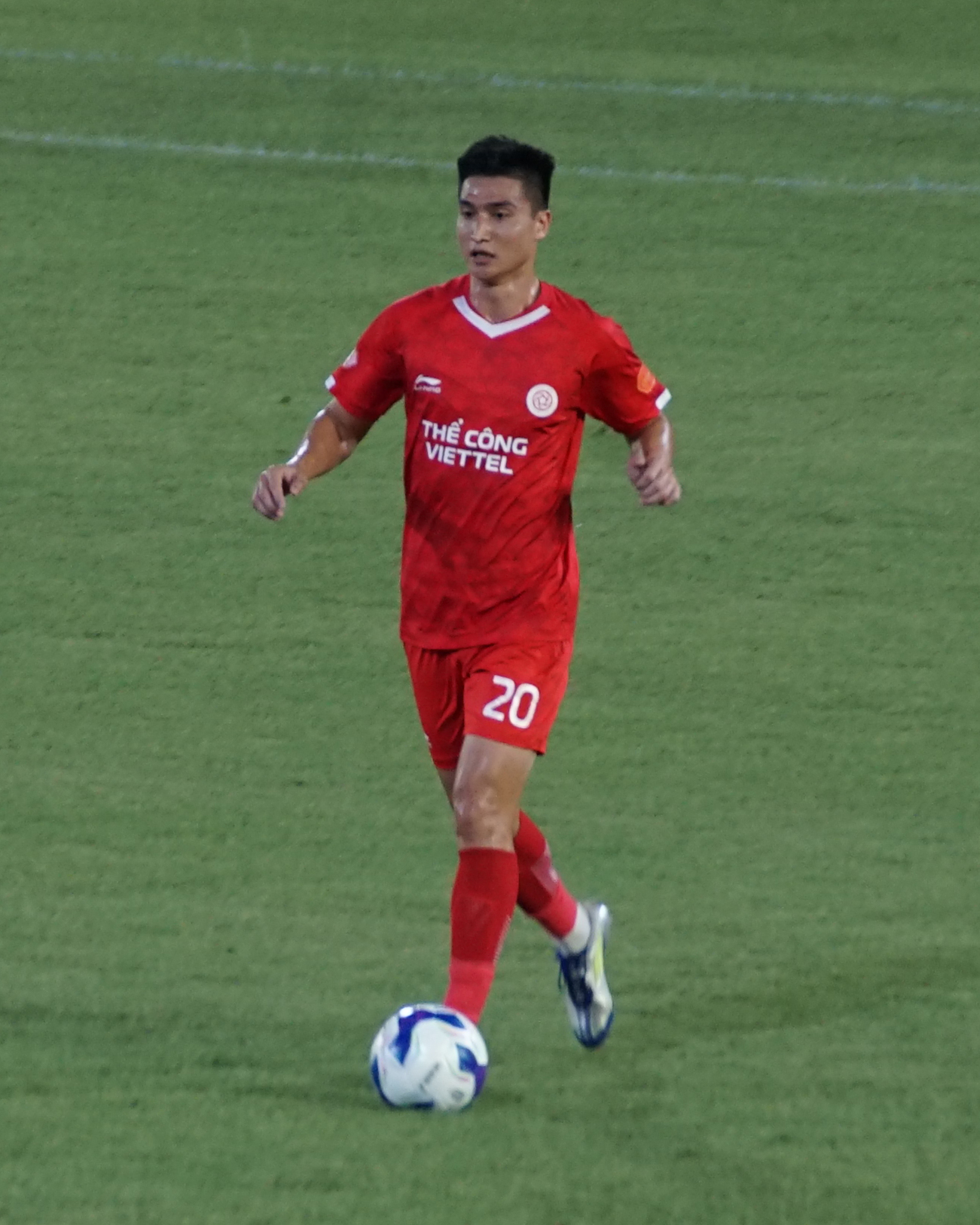
- Văn Nam in 2026

Personal information
- Full name: Đào Văn Nam
- Date of birth: 10 May 1996 (age 30)
- Place of birth: Quỳnh Phụ, Thái Bình, Vietnam
- Height: 1.81 m (5 ft 11 in)
- Position: Center-back

Team information
- Current team: Hà Nội
- Number: 17

Youth career
- 2009–2016: Vissai Ninh Bình
- 2016–2017: Hà Nội

Senior career*
Years	Team	Apps	(Gls)
2017–2023	Hồng Lĩnh Hà Tĩnh	87	(7)
2023–2026	Hà Nội	33	(1)
2026–	Thể Công–Viettel	10	(0)
- * Club domestic league appearances and goals as of 7 June 2026

Đào Văn Nam (born 10 May 1996) is a Vietnamese professional footballer who plays as a center-back for V.League 1 club Thể Công–Viettel.

== Club career ==
=== Hong Linh Ha Tinh ===
After playing youth football for Vissai Ninh Binh and Hà Nội, Văn Nam began his senior career at Hồng Lĩnh Hà Tĩnh, where he made 96 official appearances and scored 8 goals across 6 seasons.

=== Hà Nội ===
On 11 September 2023, Văn Nam signed for V.League 1 club Hà Nội on an initial three-year contract. He made his debut in a 2–1 defeat away to Wuhan Three Towns, in which he has received his second yellow card and has been sent off during added time. Van Nam made his league debut for Hanoi on 3 November 2023 against CAHN which ended in a 2–0 defeat. He scored his first goal for the club in a 2–1 home victory over Urawa Red Diamonds.

=== Thể Công–Viettel ===
In March 2025, Văn Nam signed for Hà Nội's rivals Thể Công–Viettel.

== International career ==
On 15 March 2022, Văn Nam was called up to the Vietnam national team squad for the first time, for their fixtures against Oman and Japan.

== Playing style ==
Mainly a center-back, he can also play as a left-back and a defensive midfielder.

== Career statistics ==
As of match played 14 March 2026

Appearances and goals by club, season and competition
Club	Season	League			Cup		Asia		Other		Total	
Club	Season	Division	Apps	Goals	Apps	Goals	Apps	Goals	Apps	Goals	Apps	Goals
Hồng Lĩnh Hà Tĩnh	2018	V.League 2	18	2	—		—		1 (Note: Appearance in V.League play-off)	0	19	2
Hồng Lĩnh Hà Tĩnh	2019	V.League 2	21	3	2	0	—		—		23	3
Hồng Lĩnh Hà Tĩnh	2020	V.League 1	8	0	2	0	—		—		10	0
Hồng Lĩnh Hà Tĩnh	2021	V.League 1	8	0	1	1	—		—		9	1
Hồng Lĩnh Hà Tĩnh	2022	V.League 1	21	2	2	0	—		—		23	2
Hồng Lĩnh Hà Tĩnh	2023	V.League 1	11	0	1	0	—		—		12	0
Hồng Lĩnh Hà Tĩnh	Total		87	7	8	1	0	0	1	0	96	8
Hà Nội	2023–24	V.League 1	16	1	0	0	3 (Note: Appearance(s) in AFC Champions League)	1	—		19	2
Hà Nội	2024–25	V.League 1	13	0	1	0	—		—		14	0
Hà Nội	2025–26	V.League 1	4	0	1	0	—		—		5	0
Hà Nội	Total		33	1	2	0	3	1	0	0	37	2
Thể Công–Viettel	2025–26	V.League 1	1	0	0	0	—		—		1	0
Total career			121	8	10	1	3	1	1	0	135	10

== Honours ==
Hong Linh Ha Tinh

- V.League 2: 2019; runner-up 2018
