= Nguyễn Hữu Thắng (footballer, born 2000) =

Vietnamese footballer (born 2000)

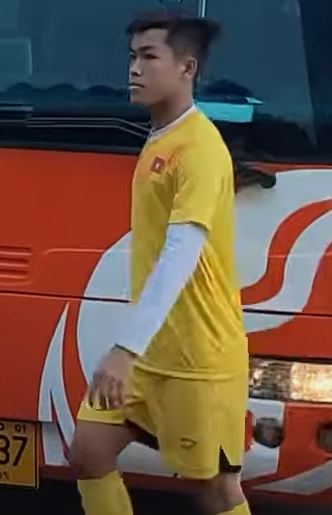
- Hữu Thắng in 2020

Personal information
- Birth name: Nguyễn Hữu Thắng
- Date of birth: 19 May 2000 (age 26)
- Place of birth: Phú Vang, Thừa Thiên Huế, Vietnam
- Height: 1.68 m (5 ft 6 in)
- Position: Attacking midfielder

Team information
- Current team: Thể Công–Viettel
- Number: 8

Youth career
- 2014–2019: Viettel

Senior career*
Years	Team	Apps	(Gls)
2019–	Thể Công–Viettel	86	(10)
2019	→ Huế (loan)	12	(7)
2020	→ Bình Định (loan)	14	(6)

International career^{‡}
2015–2016	Vietnam U16	19	(7)
2019–2020	Vietnam U19	12	(3)
2021–2022	Vietnam U23	9	(0)
- * Club domestic league appearances and goals as of 7 June 2026 ‡ National team caps and goals as of 17 September 2022

Nguyễn Hữu Thắng (born 19 May 2000) is a Vietnamese professional footballer who plays as an attacking midfielder for V.League 1 side Thể Công–Viettel.

== Club career ==
Born in Thừa Thiên Huế, Hữu Thắng is a youth product of Hà Nội's based team Viettel FC. He was part of the Viettel U-21 side that won the Vietnamese National U-21 Championship in 2020 and was chosen as the best player of the tournament.

In 2019, he was loaned to his hometown club Huế and made his professional debut during the 2019 V.League 2. He scored 7 goals after 12 games for the club.

In 2020, he remained in V.League 2, joining Bình Định on loan. He scored 6 goals and had 9 assists during the 2020 season, helping the club winning the V.League 2 title.

After his successful loan spells, Hữu Thắng was registered in Viettel's squad for the 2021 V.League 1. On 9 October 2022, he scored his first goal for the club against Hải Phòng.

== International career ==
In 2016, Hữu Thắng took part in the AFF U-16 Youth Championship with Vietnam U16 and scored 4 goals as his team reached the final, but lost to Australia in the penalty shootout. He later featured in the 2016 AFC U-16 Championship. In the decisive group stage game against Australia, Hữu Thắng scored a brace to help his team win 3–2, qualifying them to the quarter-finals, where they were defeated by Iran.

In 2018, Hữu Thắng was named in Vietnam U19 squad for the AFC U-19 Championship. He appeared in all three group stage matches but Vietnam failed to reach the knockout stage after three defeats.

== Playing style ==
Hữu Thắng is a tricky left-footed player with high tactical awareness and the ability to make breakout dribbles during the match. His playstyle resembles Nguyễn Quang Hải (born 1997).

== Honours ==
Bình Định

- V.League 2: 2020

Individual

- Vietnamese National U-21 Championship best player: 2020
