= Phạm Trung Hiếu =

Vietnamese footballer

Personal information
- Full name: Phạm Trung Hiếu
- Date of birth: September 22, 1998 (age 28)
- Place of birth: An Dương, Hải Phòng, Vietnam
- Height: 1.70 m (5 ft 7 in)
- Positions: Right back; winger

Team information
- Current team: Thể Công–Viettel
- Number: 16

Youth career
- 2015–2018: Than Quảng Ninh

Senior career*
Years	Team	Apps	(Gls)
2017	→ Công An Nhân Dân (loan)	13	(1)
2018–2021	Than Quảng Ninh	44	(0)
2022–2026	Hải Phòng	98	(2)
2026–	Thể Công–Viettel	2	(0)

International career^{‡}
2023	Vietnam	1	(0)
- * Club domestic league appearances and goals as of 11 September 2026 ‡ National team caps and goals as of 22 October 2023

Phạm Trung Hiếu (born 22 September 1998) is a Vietnamese professional professional footballer who plays as a right back or winger for V.League 1 club Thể Công–Viettel.

== Club career ==
Born in Haiphong, Trung Hiếu was formed in the Than Quảng Ninh youth academy. He was promoted to the first team in 2018 and was mainly used as a winger. In August 2021, Than Quảng Ninh ceased operations because the team was uncapable of paying the team members' salaries. As the result, Trung Hiếu worked as a security guard during a short period.

In 2022, Trung Hiếu joined his hometown club Hải Phòng. At the new team, he was repositioned to operate as right back. He quickly became a crucial starter with his regularity and compliance with coach Chu Đình Nghiêm's tactical requirements. He was the wing back with the most game time during the 2023 V.League 1 season, appearing in 18 out of 20 matches possible.

In July 2022, after his contract with Hải Phòng expired, Trung Hiếu joined league fellow Thể Công–Viettel.

== International career ==
In September 2023, Trung Hiếu was called up to the Vietnam national team. On 11 September 2023, he made his international debut in a friendly match against Palestine but was substituted out after seven minutes following a fibula fracture.

== Personal life ==
In May 2023, Trung Hiếu married former Vietnam women's national team player Châu Thị Vang.
