= Kyle Colonna =

American soccer player (born 1999)

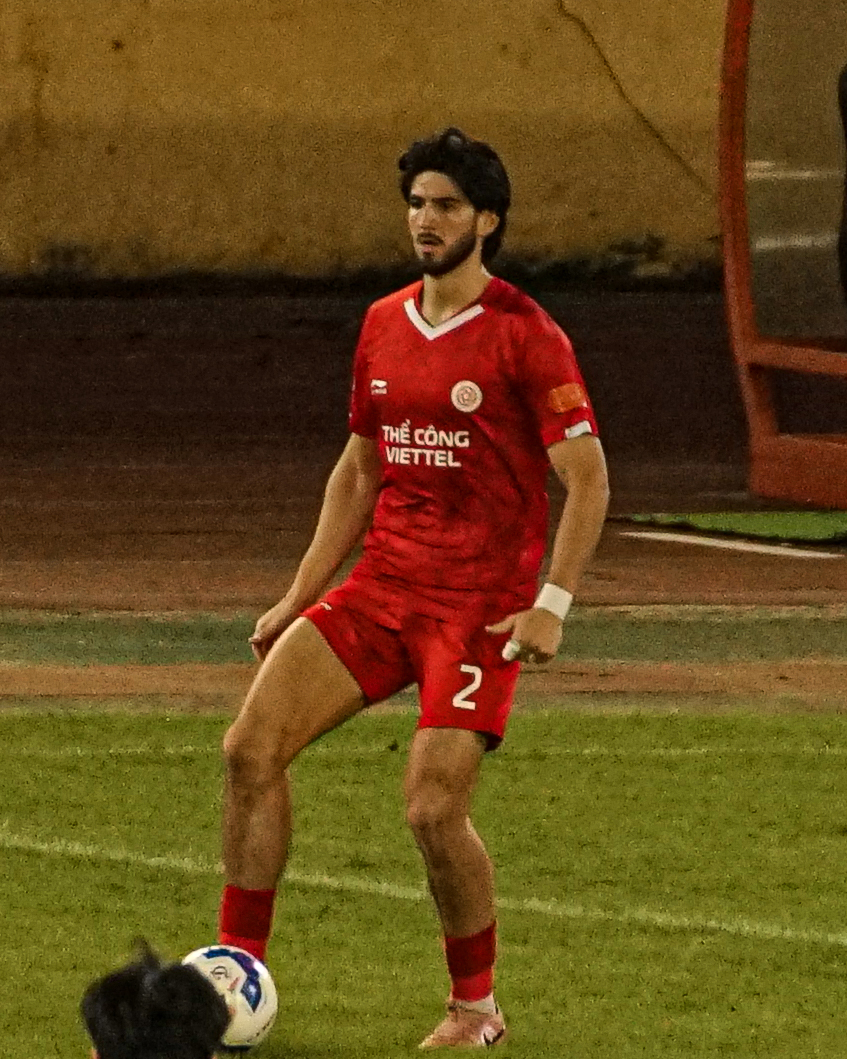
- Colonna with The Cong-Viettel 2026

Personal information
- Full name: Kyle Nino Colonna
- Date of birth: August 2, 1999 (age 27)
- Place of birth: Danville, California, United States
- Height: 1.88 m (6 ft 2 in)
- Position: Center-back

Team information
- Current team: The Cong-Viettel
- Number: 2

Youth career
- 2016–2018: De Anza Force

College career
Years	Team	Apps	(Gls)
2018–2022	San Diego State Aztecs	52	(3)

Senior career*
Years	Team	Apps	(Gls)
2019	San Francisco Glens	5	(1)
2023	New Mexico United	10	(2)
2024–2025	Hanoi FC	17	(0)
2025–	Thể Công–Viettel	29	(2)

International career^{‡}
2026–	Vietnam	1	(0)
- * Club domestic league appearances and goals as of October 31, 2026 ‡ National team caps and goals as of November 17, 2026

Kyle Nino Colonna (born August 2, 1999), also known as Lương Chí Khải, is a professional soccer player who plays as a center back for V.League 1 club Thể Công–Viettel. Born in the United States, he plays for the Vietnam national team.

== Club career ==
=== Youth and college ===
Colonna played two years of varsity soccer at Monte Vista High School, where he was named to All-League EBAL First Team and led the team to North Coast Section Championship and earned NCS Championship MVP. Colonna also spent two seasons with USSDA club side De Anza Force.

In 2018, Colonna attended San Diego State University to play college soccer. He redshirted his freshman season but went on to make 52 appearances for the Aztecs over four seasons, scoring three goals and adding a single assist.

While at college, Colonna also appeared for USL League Two side San Francisco Glens during their 2019 season, scoring a single goal in five regular season games.

Following college, Colonna was eligible in the 2023 MLS SuperDraft, but went undrafted.

=== Professional ===
Following a successful trial, Colonna signed his first professional contract with USL Championship side New Mexico United on March 14, 2023.

On August 17, 2024, Colonna joined V.League 1 club Hanoi FC, signing a one-year contract. On September 14, he made his debut for the club in 1–0 win against Quy Nhon Binh Dinh in the league.

On August 7, 2025, after his contract with Hanoi FC expired, Colonna joined V.League 1 fellow club The Cong-Viettel.

== International career ==
In November 2026, Colonna received his first call-up to the Vietnam national team, being named in the squad for the friendly tournament Casper Cup.

== Personal life ==
Colonna was born in Danville, California, in the United States, to an American father and an ethnically Hoa Vietnamese mother. His maternal grandfather is from Hanoi. On August 31, 2026, he officially obtained Vietnamese citizenship under the Vietnamese name Lương Chí Khải.

== Career statistics ==
=== Club ===
As of match played November 4, 2026

Appearances and goals by club, season and competition
Club	Season	League			National cup		Continental		Other		Total	
Club	Season	Division	Apps	Goals	Apps	Goals	Apps	Goals	Apps	Goals	Apps	Goals
San Francisco Glens	2019	USL League Two	5	1	—		—		—		5	1
New Mexico United	2023	USL Championship	10	2	1	0	—		—		11	2
Hanoi FC	2024–25	V.League 1	17	0	1	0	—		—		18	0
The Cong–Viettel	2025–26	V.League 1	24	1	4	0	—		—		28	1
The Cong–Viettel	2026–27	V.League 1	5	1	0	0	4 (Note: Appearances in AFC Champions League Two)	0	—		9	1
The Cong–Viettel	Total		29	2	4	0	4	0	0	0	37	2
Career total			61	5	6	0	4	0	—		71	5

== Honours ==
Individual

- V.League 1 Team of the Season: 2025–26
