= Hàng Đẫy Stadium =

Stadium in Hanoi, Vietnam

Coordinates: 21°1′47″N 105°49′59″E

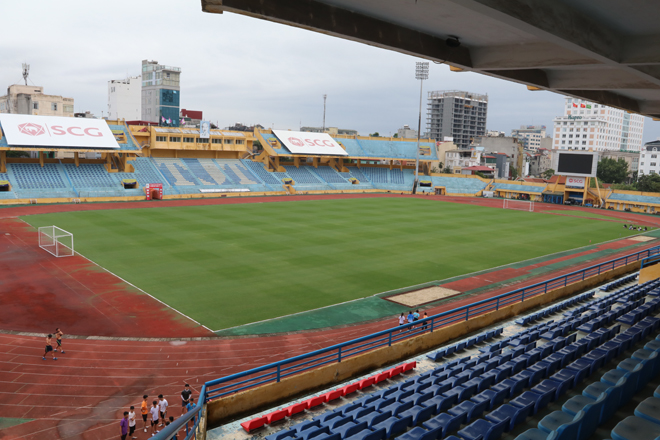
- Interactive map of Hàng Đẫy Stadium
- Location: Ô Chợ Dừa, Hanoi, Vietnam
- Owner: Hanoi Government
- Operator: T&T Group
- Capacity: 22,500 (designed capacity); 15,000 (for safety reason)
- Field size: 105 × 68 m

Construction
- Opened: 1934
- Expanded: 1958

Tenants
- Công An Hà Nội (2022–present); Hà Nội (2009–present); Viettel (1999–2005, 2009–2024; occasionally used since 2024–25 season); Vietnam national football team (Selected matches)

Hàng Đẫy Stadium (Vietnamese: Sân vận động Hàng Đẫy), also known as Hanoi Stadium, is a multi-purpose stadium in Hanoi, Vietnam. It is currently used mostly for football matches. The stadium holds 22,500 spectators; however, due to the dilapidating condition, the upper level of stand B is currently unusable, reducing this number to approximately 15,000. In the period from 2000 to 2003, the stadium was called Hanoi Stadium. On April 24, 2003, the historic name "Hàng Đẫy" was restored. Hàng Đẫy is located in the center of Hanoi. Before the construction of Mỹ Đình National Stadium, it was where Vietnam hosted football matches of both the men and women's as well as the Olympic teams. The stadium also was the ground for various sporting and cultural events of Hanoi and Vietnam. In 1998, the opening, the Group B and the Tiger Cup 1998 Final matches took place here.

In the 2009 season, all four of the football clubs based in Hanoi – Hà Nội, The Cong-Viettel, Hòa Phát Hà Nội, and Hà Nội ACB – have chosen the stadium as their home ground.

== History ==
Hàng Đẫy was established in 1934 as a football field for Hanoi's École d’éducation physique (EDEP - School of Physical Education). Shortly after, EDEP was renamed into Société d'éducation physique du Tonkin (SEPTO - Tonkin Society of Physical Education). From 1936 to 1938, a 400-seat wooden stand as well as bordering walls were constructed, and the stadium was subsequently known as SEPTO Stadium. On February 16, 1956, the stadium was rebuilt and the new Hàng Đẫy Stadium was opened on August 24, 1958. This structure remains virtually the same until today with some upgrades being done in the 1990s.

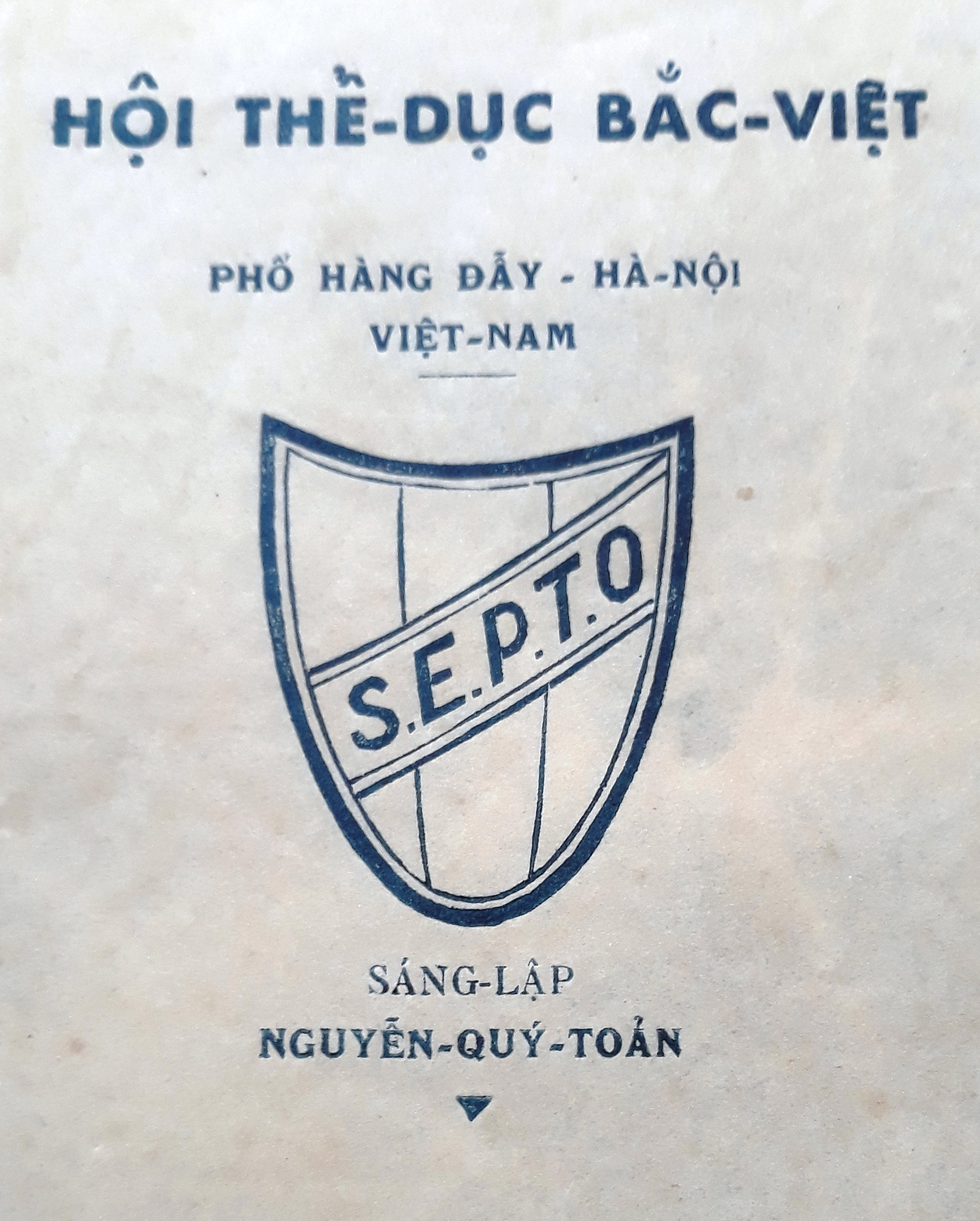
SEPTO Logo, before 1955. Founder: Mr. Nguyễn Quý Toản.

=== New stadium project ===
During the visit of the Communist Party of Vietnam's general secretary Nguyễn Phú Trọng to France and met with the President Emmanuel Macron, the two have signed plenty of cooperation deals, including the rebuild and renovation of Hàng Đẫy Stadium. The new stadium will cost 250 million euros and they will be designed and built by French company Bouygues. However, due to many problems, this project has not yet scheduled an implementation date.

== International football matches ==
Date	Competition	Team 1	Res.	Team 2	Attendance
26 August 1998	1998 AFF Championship	Malaysia	0–2	Singapore	5,000
26 August 1998	1998 AFF Championship	Vietnam	4–1	Laos	20,000
28 August 1998	1998 AFF Championship	Malaysia	0–0	Laos	15,000
28 August 1998	1998 AFF Championship	Vietnam	0–0	Singapore	15,000
30 August 1998	1998 AFF Championship	Singapore	4–1	Vietnam	15,000
30 August 1998	1998 AFF Championship	Vietnam	1–0	Malaysia	15,000
3 September 1998	1998 AFF Championship	Vietnam	3–0	Thailand	23,000
5 September 1998	1998 AFF Championship	Vietnam	0–1	Singapore	25,000
4 December 2003	2003 SEA Games	Vietnam	1–0	Indonesia	15,000
7 December 2003	2003 SEA Games	Vietnam	1–0	Laos	12,000
22 March 2017	Friendly	Vietnam	1–1	Chinese Taipei	23,120
24 November 2018	2018 AFF Championship	Vietnam	3–0	Cambodia	14,000
8 December 2024	2024 ASEAN Championship	Timor-Leste	0–10	Thailand	1,239
14 December 2024	2024 ASEAN Championship	Timor-Leste	0–3	Singapore	1,000
26 March 2026	Friendly	Vietnam	3–0	Bangladesh	8,000
