= 2021 V.League 1 =

65th season of the highest division of association football in Vietnam

LS V.League 1 – 2021
- Season: 2021
- Dates: 15 January – 2 May 2021 (Remaining matches cancelled)
- Champions: Not awarded
- Relegated: None
- Matches: 84
- Goals: 194 (2.31 per match)
- Top goalscorer: Nguyen Van Toan; Oussou Konan; Rodrigo Dias (7 goals)
- Biggest home win: Hanoi FC 4–0 Than Quang Ninh (11 April 2021)
- Biggest away win: Ho Chi Minh City FC 0–3 Hanoi FC (23 March 2021); Viettel 0–3 Hoang Anh Gia Lai (24 March 2021); Saigon FC 0–3 Nam Dinh FC (28 March 2021)
- Highest scoring: Hong Linh Ha Tinh 3–5 Dong A Thanh Hoa (3 April 2021)
- Longest winning run: Hoang Anh Gia Lai (7 matches)
- Longest unbeaten run: Hoang Anh Gia Lai (11 matches)
- Longest winless run: Haiphong FC (6 matches)
- Longest losing run: Saigon FC (5 matches)
- Highest attendance: 20,000; Topenland Binh Dinh 0–1 Viettel (11 April 2021)
- Lowest attendance: 1,500; Viettel 3–0 Saigon FC (3 April 2021)
- Total attendance: 465,600 (excluding matches played behind closed doors)
- Average attendance: 6,208
- All statistics correct as of complete.

The 2021 V.League 1 (known as the LS V.League 1 for sponsorship reasons) was the 38th season of the V.League 1, the highest division of Vietnamese football and the 21st as a professional league.

The season was paused for a third time on 6 May 2021 due to an outbreak of the delta variant of the coronavirus in the country.

Despite attempts to re-start the season by late November, after a meeting with all teams on August 21, the season was officially cancelled, with no champion determined, and no teams to be relegated; the slots for the 2022 AFC Champions League and 2022 AFC Cup was awarded to Hoang Anh Gia Lai and Viettel respectively in November 26. After the cancellation of the league, LS Group ceased sponsorship due to issues, and Sâm Ngọc Linh Kon Tum was chosen as the main sponsor for the next season.

== Competition format ==
The league was scheduled to operate in two stages, with the top six teams qualify for the championship group and remaining teams qualify for the relegation group after a single-round robin regular season. The season was cancelled with one matchday left until the completion of the regular season.

== Teams ==
A total of 14 teams contested the league, including 13 teams from the 2020 season and Topenland Binh Dinh promoted from the 2020 V.League 2 season.

=== Stadiums and locations ===
Locations of the 2021 V.League 1 teams

Team	Location	Stadium	Capacity	Previous season rank
Topenland Binh Dinh	Binh Dinh	Quy Nhon	15,000	VL2 (1st)
Becamex Binh Duong	Binh Duong	Go Dau	13,035	VL1 (6th)
SHB Danang	Danang	Hoa Xuan	20,000	VL1 (9th)
Hoang Anh Gia Lai	Gia Lai	Pleiku	12,000	VL1 (7th)
Haiphong FC	Haiphong	Lach Tray	25,000	VL1 (12th)
Hanoi FC	Hanoi	Hang Day	22,500	VL1 (2nd)
Viettel	Hanoi	Hang Day	22,500	VL1 (1st)
Hong Linh Ha Tinh	Ha Tinh	Ha Tinh	20,000	VL1 (8th)
Ho Chi Minh City FC	Ho Chi Minh City	Thong Nhat	16,000	VL1 (5th)
Saigon FC	Ho Chi Minh City	Thong Nhat	16,000	VL1 (3rd)
Nam Dinh FC	Nam Dinh	Thien Truong	30,000	VL1 (13th)
Song Lam Nghe An	Nghe An	Vinh	18,000	VL1 (10th)
Than Quang Ninh	Quang Ninh	Cam Pha	20,000	VL1 (4th)
Dong A Thanh Hoa	Thanh Hoa	Thanh Hoa	12,000	VL1 (11th)

=== Personnel and kits ===
Note: Flags indicate national team as has been defined under FIFA eligibility rules. Players may hold more than one non-FIFA nationality.

Team	Manager	Captain	Kit manufacturer
TopenLand Binh Dinh	(Vietnam) Nguyễn Đức Thắng	(Vietnam) Bùi Văn Hiếu	(Vietnam) Kamito
Becamex Binh Duong	(Vietnam) Nguyễn Thanh Sơn (caretaker)	(Senegal) Pape Omar Faye	(Vietnam) Kamito
SHB Da Nang	(Vietnam) Phan Thanh Hùng	(Vietnam) Đặng Anh Tuấn	(Vietnam) Kamito
Hoang Anh Gia Lai	(Thailand) Kiatisuk Senamuang	(Vietnam) Lương Xuân Trường	(Japan) Mizuno
Haiphong FC	(Vietnam) Phạm Anh Tuấn	(Jamaica) Andre Fagan	(Japan) Jogarbola
Hanoi FC	(South Korea) Park Choong-kyun	(Vietnam) Nguyễn Văn Quyết	(Japan) Jogarbola
Viettel	(Vietnam) Trương Việt Hoàng	(Vietnam) Bùi Tiến Dũng	(Thailand) FBT
Hong Linh Ha Tinh	(Vietnam) Nguyễn Thành Công	(Vietnam) Trần Phi Sơn	(Spain) Kelme
Ho Chi Minh City FC	(Brazil) Alexandré Pölking	(Vietnam) Sầm Ngọc Đức	(Spain) Kelme
Saigon FC	(Vietnam) Phùng Thanh Phương	(Japan) Daisuke Matsui	Made by club
Nam Dinh FC	(Vietnam) Nguyễn Văn Sỹ	(Vietnam) Lâm Anh Quang	(Spain) Kelme
Song Lam Nghe An	(Vietnam) Nguyễn Huy Hoàng (caretaker)	(Vietnam) Hoàng Văn Khánh	(England) Mitre
Than Quang Ninh	(Vietnam) Hoàng Thọ	(Vietnam) Phạm Nguyên Sa	(Spain) Joma
Dong A Thanh Hoa	(Serbia) Ljupko Petrović	(Vietnam) Hoàng Đình Tùng	(Japan) Jogarbola

=== Managerial changes ===
Team	Outgoing manager	Manner of departure	Date of vacancy	Position in table	Incoming manager	Date of appointment
Hoang Anh Gia Lai	(Vietnam) Duong Minh Ninh (Vietnam) Nguyen Van Dan	Mutual consent	November 2020	Pre-season	(Thailand) Kiatisuk Senamuang	November 2020
Ho Chi Minh City FC	(South Korea) Jung Hae-seong	Resigned	12 November 2020	Pre-season	(Brazil) Alexandré Pölking	2 December 2020
Dong A Thanh Hoa	(Vietnam) Mai Xuân Hợp	Mutual consent	26 November 2020	Pre-season	(Serbia) Ljupko Petrović	26 November 2020
Nam Dinh FC	(Vietnam) Pham Hong Phu	Mutual consent	14 December 2020	Pre-season	(Vietnam) Nguyen Van Sy	14 December 2020
Than Quang Ninh	(Vietnam) Phan Thanh Hùng	Resigned	16 December 2020	Pre-season	(Vietnam) Hoang Tho	16 December 2020
Becamex Binh Duong	(Vietnam) Nguyen Thanh Son	Mutual consent	19 December 2020	Pre-season	(Vietnam) Phan Thanh Hùng	23 December 2020
Saigon FC	(Vietnam) Vu Tien Thanh	Mutual consent	24 February 2021	4th	(Japan) Masahiro Shimoda	25 February 2021
Saigon FC	(Japan) Masahiro Shimoda	Sacked	30 March 2021	11th	(Vietnam) Phung Thanh Phuong	30 March 2021
Hanoi FC	(Vietnam) Chu Dinh Nghiem	Resigned	3 April 2021	7th	(Vietnam) Hoang Van Phuc (caretaker)	3 April 2021
Hong Linh Ha Tinh	(Vietnam) Pham Minh Duc	Resigned	12 April 2021	14th	(Vietnam) Nguyen Thanh Cong	14 April 2021
Becamex Binh Duong	(Vietnam) Phan Thanh Hung	Resigned	14 April 2021	6th	(Vietnam) Nguyen Thanh Son (caretaker)	14 April 2021
Hanoi FC	(Vietnam) Hoang Van Phuc (caretaker)	End of caretaker spell	20 April 2021	8th	(South Korea) Park Choong-kyun	20 April 2021
Song Lam Nghe An	(Vietnam) Ngo Quang Truong	Resigned	30 April 2021	14th	(Vietnam) Nguyen Huy Hoang (caretaker)	30 April 2021
SHB Danang	(Vietnam) Le Huynh Duc	Resigned	3 May 2021	9th	(Vietnam) Phan Thanh Hung	3 May 2021

== Foreign players ==
Players name in bold indicates the player was registered after the start of the season.

Club	Player 1	Player 2	Player 3	Player 4 (AFC Player)	Player 5 (Naturalized Vietnamese player)	Former Player
Topenland Binh Dinh	(Brazil) Hêndrio	(Jamaica) Rimario Gordon	(South Korea) Ahn Byung-keon		(Czech Republic) → (Vietnam) Tony Le^{1}	
Becamex Binh Duong	(Burkina Faso) Ali Rabo	(Senegal) Pape Omar Faye	(United States) Victor Mansaray			
SHB Danang	(Brazil) Janclesio	(Brazil) Rafaelson	(Brazil) Hedipo			(Brazil) Hedipo (France) Papa Ibou Kébé (Brazil) Claudecir
Hoang Anh Gia Lai	(Brazil) Washington Brandão	(South Korea) Kim Dong-su	(Serbia) Damir Memović		(Nigeria) → (Vietnam) Suleiman Abdullahi (United States) → (Vietnam) Steven Dang^{1}	
Haiphong FC	(Jamaica) Andre Fagan	(Jamaica) Jermie Lynch	**(Uganda) Joseph Mpande**		(Germany) → (Vietnam) Adriano Schmidt^{1} (Russia) → (Vietnam) Andrey Nguyen ^{1} (Australia) → (Vietnam) Martin Lo^{1}	(Brazil) Diego Silva
Hanoi FC	(Brazil) Bruno Cantanhede	(Brazil) Geovane Magno	(Uganda) Moses Oloya			
Viettel	(Brazil) **Bruno Matos**	(Brazil) Caíque	(Brazil) Pedro Paulo	(Uzbekistan) **Jahongir Abdumuminov**		(Brazil) Luizão
Hong Linh Ha Tinh	(Jamaica) **Chevaughn Walsh**	(Nigeria) Ismahil Akinade	(Nigeria) Kelly Kester			(Brazil) Claudecir
Ho Chi Minh City FC	(Brazil) **Brendon Lucas**	(Brazil) **Patrick Leonardo**	(Brazil) João Paulo		(United States) → (Vietnam) Lee Nguyen^{1}	(Senegal) Papé Diakité (Brazil) Dário Junior (Brazil) Junior Barros
Saigon FC	(Brazil) Thiago Melo	**(France) Papa Ibou Kébé**	(Senegal) **Papé Diakité**	(Japan) Daisuke Matsui	(Argentina) → (Vietnam) Gastón Merlo	(Japan) Hiroyuki Takasaki (South Korea) Woo Sang-ho
Nam Dinh FC	(Brazil) Rodrigo Dias	(Brazil) Wesley dos Santos	(Ivory Coast) **Oussou Konan**			(Kosovo) Gramoz Kurtaj
Song Lam Nghe An	(Brazil) **Felipe Martins**	(Nigeria) Peter Samuel Onyekachi				(Serbia) Igor Jelić (Brazil) Bruno Henrique
Than Quang Ninh	(Brazil) **Diogo Pereira**	(Brazil) Eydison	(Brazil) Gustavo		(Uganda) → (Vietnam) Geoffrey Kizito	(Brazil) Patrick Leonardo
Dong A Thanh Hoa	(Brazil) Zé Paulo	(Cameroon) Louis Ewonde	(Kosovo) **Gramoz Kurtaj**		(Nigeria) → (Vietnam) Samson Kayode	(Jamaica) Chevaughn Walsh

- **^1** Naturalized players whose parents or grandparents were born in Vietnam, thus are regarded as local players.

== First phase ==
=== Table ===
Pos	Team	Pld	W	D	L	GF	GA	GD	Pts	Qualification
1	Hoang Anh Gia Lai	12	9	2	1	23	9	+14	29	Qualification for AFC Champions League Group stage (Note: After the abandonment of the season due to effects from COVID-19 pandemic in Vietnam, it was decided that the league's first placed team would take the AFC Champions League slot, with the AFC Cup slots to go to the second and third placed teams.)
2	Viettel	12	8	2	2	16	9	+7	26	Qualification for AFC Cup Group stage
3	Than Quang Ninh	12	6	1	5	12	11	+1	19	Withdrawn after the season's abandonment. (Note: omitted from V-League competitions for 2022, after loss of their main sponsor and other financial difficulties.)
4	Nam Dinh FC	12	6	0	6	23	21	+2	18	
5	Dong A Thanh Hoa	12	5	2	5	18	15	+3	17	
6	Becamex Binh Duong	12	5	2	5	14	17	−3	17	
7	Hanoi FC	12	5	1	6	17	14	+3	16	
8	Topenland Binh Dinh	12	4	4	4	10	9	+1	16	
9	SHB Danang	12	5	1	6	11	11	0	16	
10	Hong Linh Ha Tinh	12	4	3	5	16	17	−1	15	
11	Ho Chi Minh City FC	12	4	2	6	14	17	−3	14	
12	Haiphong FC	12	4	2	6	7	15	−8	14	
13	Saigon FC	12	4	1	7	6	14	−8	13	
14	Song Lam Nghe An	12	3	1	8	7	15	−8	10	

Source: VPF
Rules for classification: 1) Points; 2) Goal difference; 3) Goals scored; 4) Disciplinary points; 5) Play-off; 6) Drawing of lots

==== Positions by round ====
This table lists the positions of teams after each week of matches.

Team ╲ Round	1	2	3	4	5	6	7	8	9	10	11	12
Becamex Binh Duong	3	2	6	10	6	6	8	5	6	5	6	6
Dong A Thanh Hoa	12	12	7	11	13	14	10	8	9	7	8	5
Haiphong FC	5	1	5	2	5	8	9	11	12	10	9	12
Hanoi FC	14	14	12	9	3	4	7	9	5	8	10	7
Hoang Anh Gia Lai	11	8	3	4	1	1	1	1	1	1	1	1
Ho Chi Minh City FC	10	6	11	7	12	12	13	10	11	12	13	11
Hong Linh Ha Tinh	9	13	14	14	14	13	14	13	14	14	12	10
Nam Dinh FC	1	5	10	13	10	7	5	6	7	6	3	4
Saigon FC	6	9	4	8	11	11	12	14	13	13	11	13
SHB Danang	4	3	1	1	4	3	3	4	4	4	5	9
Song Lam Nghe An	8	10	13	12	7	10	11	12	10	11	14	14
Than Quang Ninh	2	7	2	6	2	2	2	2	3	3	4	3
Topenland Binh Dinh	7	4	9	5	8	9	6	7	8	9	7	8
Viettel	13	11	8	3	9	5	4	3	2	2	2	2

Source: Table by round (in Vietnamese)

=== Results ===
Home \ Away	BBD	DTH	HAI	HAN	HOA	HCM	HHT	NDI	SGN	SDN	SNA	TQN	TBD	VFC
Becamex Binh Duong		1–0	0–1			— (Note: Cancelled due to COVID-19 pandemic)		4–3	1–0	1–0				
Dong A Thanh Hoa			3–0		1–2 (Note: Played behind closed doors due to an outbreak of COVID-19 in Ho Chi Minh City and Bac Giang province.)	1–1		3–0 (Note: Played behind closed doors due to an outbreak of COVID-19 in the Hai Duong and Quang Ninh provinces.)		1–3	1–0			1–1
Haiphong FC				0–2	0–2			3–2		0–0	2–0	0–2	—	
Hanoi FC	1–2	3–2					1–1		3–1			4–0	0–1	0–1
Hoang Anh Gia Lai	2–2			1–0		3–0		4–3			2–1		2–1	
Ho Chi Minh City FC			3–0	0–3			2–0		1–0		3–0		1–3	1–1
Hong Linh Ha Tinh	4–2	3–5	1–0		0–0			3–2				1–2	1–1	
Nam Dinh FC				3–0		3–2				—	1–0		1–0	1–2
Saigon FC		—	0–0		1–0		1–0	0–3			1–0			
SHB Danang				2–0	0–2	1–0	1–0		1–2		1–2			1–2
Song Lam Nghe An	2–0			—			0–2					1–0	1–1	0–1
Than Quang Ninh	1–0	2–0			—	2–0		0–1	1–0	0–1				
Topenland Binh Dinh	0–0	0–1							1–0	1–0		1–1		0–1
Viettel	3–1		0–1		0–3		—		3–0			2–1		

Updated to match(es) played on 2 May 2021. Source: Vietnam Professional Football
Legend: Blue = home team win; Yellow = draw; Red = away team win.

==== Season progress ====
Team ╲ Round	1	2	3	4	5	6	7	8	9	10	11	12
Becamex Binh Duong	W	W	L	L	W	D	L	W	L	W	L	D
Dong A Thanh Hoa	L	D	W	L	L	L	W	W	D	W	L	W
Haiphong	W	W	L	W	L	L	L	L	D	D	W	L
Hanoi FC	L	L	W	W	W	D	L	L	W	L	L	W
Hoang Anh Gia Lai	L	W	W	D	W	W	W	W	W	W	W	D
Ho Chi Minh City	L	W	L	W	L	L	L	W	D	L	D	W
Hong Linh Ha Tinh	L	L	L	D	W	D	L	D	L	W	W	W
Nam Dinh	W	L	L	L	W	W	W	L	L	W	W	L
Saigon	W	L	W	L	L	L	L	L	W	D	W	L
SHB Da Nang	W	W	W	L	L	W	W	L	D	L	L	L
Song Lam Nghe An	D	L	L	W	W	L	L	L	W	L	L	L
Than Quang Ninh	W	L	W	L	W	W	W	W	L	L	L	D
Topenland Binh Dinh	D	W	L	W	L	D	W	D	L	L	W	D
Viettel	L	D	W	W	L	W	W	W	W	W	D	W

Source: VPF
W = Win; D = Draw; L = Lose

== Season statistics ==
As of end of season

=== Scoring ===
==== Top scorers ====
Rank	Player	Club	Goals
1	(Vietnam) Nguyễn Văn Toàn	Hoang Anh Gia Lai	7
1	(Ivory Coast) Oussou Konan	Nam Dinh	7
1	(Brazil) Rodrigo Dias	Nam Dinh	7
4	(Brazil) Eydison	Than Quang Ninh	6
4	(Brazil) Geovane	Hanoi	6
4	(Vietnam) Nguyễn Công Phượng	Hoang Anh Gia Lai	6
4	(Vietnam) Nguyễn Tiến Linh	Becamex Binh Duong	6
4	(Brazil) Rafaelson	SHB Da Nang	6
9	(United States) Lee Nguyen	Ho Chi Minh City	5
9	(Vietnam) Phan Văn Đức	Song Lam Nghe An	5

Source: Soccerway

==== Hat-tricks ====
Player	For	Against	Result	Date
(Brazil) Rafaelson	SHB Da Nang	Dong A Thanh Hoa	3–1 (A)	29 March 2021
(Vietnam) Nguyễn Tiến Linh	Becamex Binh Duong	Nam Dinh	4–3 (H)	8 April 2021

=== Clean sheets ===
Rank	Player	Club	Clean sheets
1	(Vietnam) Huỳnh Tuấn Linh	Hoang Anh Gia Lai	6
2	(Vietnam) Nguyễn Hoài Anh	Than Quang Ninh	5
2	(Vietnam) Nguyễn Thanh Diệp	Dong A Thanh Hoa	5
2	(Vietnam) Trần Nguyên Mạnh	Viettel	5
5	(Vietnam) Đinh Xuân Việt	Nam Dinh	4
5	(Vietnam) Phạm Văn Phong	Saigon	4
5	(Vietnam) Nguyễn Tuấn Mạnh	SHB Danang	4
5	(Vietnam) Trần Đình Minh Hòang	Topenland Binh Dinh	4
5	(Vietnam) Trần Đức Cường	Becamex Binh Duong	4
10	4 players		3

== Awards ==
=== Monthly awards ===
Month	Manager of the Month		Player of the Month		Goal of the Month	
Month	Manager	Club	Player	Club	Player	Club
January/March	(Thailand) Kiatisuk Senamuang	Hoang Anh Gia Lai	(Vietnam) Nguyễn Văn Tòan	Hoang Anh Gia Lai	(Vietnam) Phan Văn Đức	Song Lam Nghe An
April	(Thailand) Kiatisuk Senamuang	Hoang Anh Gia Lai	(Vietnam) Nguyễn Văn Tòan	Hoang Anh Gia Lai	(Vietnam) Lương Xuân Trường	Hoang Anh Gia Lai
