= 2020 V.League 1 =

64th season of the highest division of association football in Vietnam

LS V.League 1 – 2020
- Season: 2020
- Dates: 7 March – 8 November
- Champions: Thế Công-Viettel; 1st VL1 title 6th Vietnamese title
- Relegated: Quang Nam
- Matches: 126
- Goals: 319 (2.53 per match)
- Top goalscorer: Pedro Paulo; Rimario Gordon (12 goals)
- Biggest home win: Becamex Binh Duong 5–0 Haiphong (11 June 2020); SHB Da Nang 6–1 Quang Nam (11 June 2020)
- Biggest away win: Hoang Anh Gia Lai 0–4 Hanoi (15 October 2020)
- Highest scoring: SHB Da Nang 6–1 Quang Nam (11 June 2020); Hoang Anh Gia Lai 5–2 Ho Chi Minh City (1 October 2020)
- Longest winning run: Hanoi; Saigon; Viettel (4 matches)
- Longest unbeaten run: Hanoi; Saigon (11 matches)
- Longest winless run: Quang Nam (7 matches)
- Longest losing run: Hoang Anh Gia Lai (6 matches)
- Highest attendance: 20,000; Hong Linh Ha Tinh 1–1 Hanoi (12 June 2020)
- Lowest attendance: 0
- Total attendance: 689,400
- Average attendance: 6,693
- All statistics correct as of complete.

The 2020 V.League 1 season (or LS V.League 1 2020 for sponsorship reasons) was the 37th season of the V.League 1, the highest division of Vietnamese football and the 20th as a professional league.

Due to the COVID-19 pandemic, the schedule had been changed to begin on 7 March instead of 21 February as originally planned. All matches in matchdays 1 and 2 were played behind closed doors due to the same reason. Following the stabilizing situation, the league resumed in June, and also became the first league to allow fans into the stadium post-COVID-19 outbreak. On 26 July 2020, the league was suspended again due to another surge in COVID-19 cases.

== Changes from last season ==
=== Team changes ===
The following teams have changed division since the 2019 season.

==== To V.League 1 ====
Promoted from V.League 2

- Hong Linh Ha Tinh

==== From V.League 1 ====
Relegated to V.League 2

- Sanna Khanh Hoa BVN

=== Rules changes ===
In the 2020 season, each team could register 3+1 foreign players (3 foreign + 1 naturalized Vietnamese). The teams that participated in ASEAN Club Championship and AFC Cup (Ho Chi Minh City, Hanoi, Than Quang Ninh) could register 3+1+1 foreign players (3 foreign + 1 naturalized Vietnamese + 1 AFC player)

On 13 May 2020, the format had been slightly changed, including:

- The 1st leg will remain unchanged.
- After the 1st leg, teams will be split into 2 groups:
  - Championship group (Group A) will include the top 8 teams in the 1st leg.
  - Relegation group (Group B) will include the bottom 6 teams in the 1st leg.
- Each group will play another single round-robin format. After the end of season:
  - The champions will qualify for the 2021 AFC Champions League group stage.
  - The runners-up and the cup winners, Hanoi (or the league 3rd-placers if Hanoi qualified for AFC Club Competitions through league performance) will qualify for the 2021 AFC Cup group stage.
  - The 14th-ranked team will be relegated to 2021 V.League 2. There's no relegation playoff for this season. and the 13th-ranked team will stay in V.League 1 2021.

== Teams ==
Locations of the 2020 V.League 1 teams

Team	Location	Stadium	Capacity	Previous season rank
Becamex Binh Duong	Binh Duong	Go Dau	13,035	VL1 (4th)
SHB Danang	Danang	Hoa Xuan	20,000	VL1 (10th)
Hoang Anh Gia Lai	Gia Lai	Pleiku	12,000	VL1 (8th)
Haiphong FC	Haiphong	Lach Tray	25,000	VL1 (12th)
Hanoi FC	Hanoi	Hang Day	22,500	VL1 (1st)
Viettel	Hanoi	Hang Day	22,500	VL1 (6th)
Hong Linh Ha Tinh	Ha Tinh	Ha Tinh	20,000	VL2 (1st)
Ho Chi Minh City FC	Ho Chi Minh City	Thong Nhat	16,000	VL1 (2nd)
Saigon FC	Ho Chi Minh City	Thong Nhat	16,000	VL1 (5th)
Nam Dinh FC	Nam Dinh	Thien Truong	30,000	VL1 (11th)
Song Lam Nghe An	Nghe An	Vinh	18,000	VL1 (7th)
Quang Nam	Quang Nam	Tam Ky	15,000	VL1 (9th)
Than Quang Ninh	Quang Ninh	Cam Pha	20,000	VL1 (3rd)
Dong A Thanh Hoa	Thanh Hoa	Thanh Hoa	12,000	VL1 (13th)

=== Personnel and kits ===
Note: Flags indicate national team as has been defined under FIFA eligibility rules. Players may hold more than one non-FIFA nationality.

Team	Manager	Captain	Kit manufacturer
Becamex Binh Duong	(Vietnam) Nguyễn Thanh Sơn	(Vietnam) Tô Văn Vũ	(Vietnam) Kamito
SHB Da Nang	(Vietnam) Lê Huỳnh Đức	(Vietnam) Hà Đức Chinh	(Vietnam) Kamito
Hoang Anh Gia Lai	(Vietnam) Dương Minh Ninh (Vietnam) Nguyễn Văn Đàn	(Vietnam) Nguyễn Tuấn Anh	(Japan) Mizuno
Haiphong	(Vietnam) Phạm Anh Tuấn	(Vietnam) Doãn Ngọc Tân	(Japan) Jogarbola
Hanoi	(Vietnam) Chu Đình Nghiêm	(Vietnam) Nguyễn Văn Quyết	(Italy) Kappa
Viettel	(Vietnam) Trương Việt Hoàng	(Vietnam) Bùi Tiến Dũng	(Thailand) FBT
Hong Linh Ha Tinh	(Vietnam) Phạm Minh Đức	(Vietnam) Lê Tấn Tài	(Spain) Kelme
Ho Chi Minh City	(South Korea) Jung Hae-seong	(South Korea) Trần Phi Sơn	(Italy) Kappa
Saigon	(Vietnam) Vũ Tiến Thành	(Vietnam) Nguyễn Ngọc Duy	(South Korea) Zaicro
Duoc Nam Ha Nam Dinh	(Vietnam) Phạm Hồng Phú	(Vietnam) Đinh Xuân Việt	(Spain) Kelme
Song Lam Nghe An	(Vietnam) Ngô Quang Trường	(Vietnam) Hoàng Văn Khánh	(England) Mitre
Quang Nam	(Vietnam) Đào Quang Hùng	(Vietnam) Đinh Thanh Trung	(Japan) Jogarbola
Than Quang Ninh	(Vietnam) Phan Thanh Hùng	(Vietnam) Huỳnh Tuấn Linh	(Spain) Joma
Thanh Hoa	(Vietnam) Mai Xuân Hợp	(Vietnam) Lê Văn Thắng	(Japan) Jogarbola

=== Managerial changes ===
Team	Outgoing manager	Manner of departure	Date of vacancy	Position in table	Incoming manager	Date of appointment
Becamex Binh Duong	(Vietnam) Nguyễn Thanh Sơn	Interim over	24 October 2019	Pre-season	(Brazil) Carlos Oliveira	27 November 2019
Haiphong	(Vietnam) Trương Việt Hoàng	Resigned	24 October 2019	Pre-season	(Vietnam) Phạm Anh Tuấn	16 November 2019
Saigon	(Vietnam) Nguyễn Thành Công	Resigned	24 October 2019	Pre-season	(Vietnam) Hoàng Văn Phúc	22 November 2019
Thanh Hoa	(Vietnam) Mai Xuân Hợp	Interim over	24 October 2019	Pre-season	(Italy) Fabio Lopez	22 November 2019
Viettel	(Vietnam) Nguyễn Hải Biên	Interim over	24 October 2019	Pre-season	(Vietnam) Trương Việt Hoàng	12 November 2019
Song Lam Nghe An	(Vietnam) Nguyễn Đức Thắng	Promoted to Technical Director	16 December 2019	Pre-season	(Vietnam) Ngô Quang Trường	16 December 2019
Becamex Binh Duong	(Brazil) Carlos Oliveira	Sacked	16 February 2020	Pre-season	(Vietnam) Nguyễn Thanh Sơn	16 February 2020
Saigon	(Vietnam) Hoàng Văn Phúc	Resigned	13 March 2020	8th	(Vietnam) Vũ Tiến Thành	13 March 2020
Thanh Hoa FC	(Italy) Fabio Lopez	Sacked	8 June 2020	13th	(Vietnam) Nguyễn Thành Công	9 June 2020
Duoc Nam Ha Nam Dinh	(Vietnam) Nguyễn Văn Sỹ	Promoted to Technical Director	24 June 2020	14th	(Vietnam) Phạm Hồng Phú	24 June 2020
Quang Nam	(Vietnam) Vũ Hồng Việt	Resigned	29 June 2020	13th	(Vietnam) Đào Quang Hùng	29 June 2020
Ho Chi Minh City	(South Korea) Jung Hae-seong	Resigned	25 July 2020	5th	(Vietnam) Nguyễn Hữu Thắng	25 July 2020
Ho Chi Minh City	(Vietnam) Nguyễn Hữu Thắng	Redeployed	25 July 2020	5th	(South Korea) Jung Hae-seong	13 August 2020
Thanh Hoa FC	(Vietnam) Nguyễn Thành Công	Resigned	11 September 2020	8th	(Vietnam) Mai Xuân Hợp	12 September 2020
Hoang Anh Gia Lai	(South Korea) Lee Tae-hoon	Promoted to Technical Director	28 September 2020	7th	(Vietnam) Duong Minh Ninh (Vietnam) Nguyễn Văn Đàn	28 September 2020
Quang Nam FC	(Vietnam) Đào Quang Hùng	Sacked	12 October 2020	14th	(Vietnam) Nguyễn Thành Công	12 October 2020

== Foreign players ==
Players name in bold indicates the player is registered during the mid-season transfer window.

Club	Player 1	Player 2	Player 3	Player 4 (AFC Player)	Player 5 (Naturalized Vietnamese player)	Former Player
Becamex Binh Duong	(Brazil) Hedipo	(Burkina Faso) Ali Rabo	(France) Youssouf Touré		(Nigeria) → (Vietnam) Nguyễn Trung Đại Dương	
SHB Da Nang	(Serbia) Igor Jelić	(Democratic Republic of the Congo) Grace Tanda	(Nigeria) Ismahil Akinade			(France) Philippe Nsiah
Hoang Anh Gia Lai	(Jamaica) Chevaughn Walsh	(Nigeria) Kester Oahimijie	(Serbia) Damir Memović			
Haiphong	(Brazil) Diego	(Jamaica) **Andre Fagan**	(Uganda) Joseph Mpande		(Germany) → (Vietnam) Adriano Schmidt^{1} (Russia) → (Vietnam) Andrey Nguyen ^{1} (Australia) → (Vietnam) Martin Lo^{1}	(Brazil) Claudecir Junior
Hanoi	(Jamaica) Rimario Gordon	(Senegal) Pape Omar Faye	(Uganda) Moses Oloya			(France) Papa Ibou Kébé
Viettel	(Brazil) Bruno Cantanhede	(Brazil) Caíque	(Brazil) Luizão			
Hong Linh Ha Tinh	(Brazil) Bruno Henrique	(Brazil) Janclesio	(United States) Victor Mansaray			(Brazil) Pina
Ho Chi Minh City	(Senegal) Papé Diakité	(Costa Rica) José Guillermo Ortiz	(Costa Rica) Ariel Rodríguez			(Sweden) Viktor Prodell (Brazil) Alex Lima (Guinea-Bissau) Amido Baldé (South Korea) Seo Yong Duk
Saigon	(Brazil) Geovane	(Brazil) Pedro Paulo	(South Korea) Ahn Byung-keon			
Duoc Nam Ha Nam Dinh	(Brazil) Rafaelson	(Brazil) Thiago Papel	(Nigeria) Emmanuel Agbaji		(Argentina) → (Vietnam) Đỗ Merlo	(Burkina Faso) Valentin Zoungrana
Song Lam Nghe An	(Brazil) Gustavo	(Brazil) Felipe Martins	(Nigeria) Peter Peter Onyekachi			(The Gambia) Alagie Sosseh
Quang Nam	(Brazil) Rodrigo Dias	(Brazil) Zé Paulo	(France) Papa Ibou Kébé		(Nigeria) → (Vietnam) Hoàng Vissai	(Brazil) Lucas Rocha
Than Quang Ninh	(Brazil) **Claudecir Junior**	(Jamaica) Jermie Lynch	(Bosnia and Herzegovina) Neven Laštro		(Uganda) → (Vietnam) Nguyễn Trung Hiếu	(Jamaica) Andre Fagan
Thanh Hoa	(Cameroon) Louis Ewonde	(Cameroon) Aimé Gassissou	(Croatia) Josip Balić		(Nigeria) → (Vietnam) Hoàng Vũ Samson	(Democratic Republic of the Congo) Grace Tanda (France) Philippe Nsiah

- **^1** Naturalized players whose parents or grandparents were born in Vietnam, thus are regarded as local players.

== Phase 1 League table ==
Pos	Team	Pld	W	D	L	GF	GA	GD	Pts	Qualification
1	Saigon	13	6	6	1	19	7	+12	24	Qualified to Championship group
2	Viettel	13	6	4	3	20	15	+5	22	Qualified to Championship group
3	Than Quang Ninh	13	6	3	4	17	16	+1	21	Qualified to Championship group
4	Hanoi	13	5	5	3	20	13	+7	20	Qualified to Championship group
5	Ho Chi Minh City	13	6	2	5	23	17	+6	20	Qualified to Championship group
6	Becamex Binh Duong	13	5	5	3	17	11	+6	20	Qualified to Championship group
7	Hoang Anh Gia Lai	13	5	5	3	17	16	+1	20	Qualified to Championship group
8	Hong Linh Ha Tinh	13	4	6	3	14	12	+2	18	Qualified to Championship group
9	SHB Da Nang	13	4	4	5	19	15	+4	16	Qualified to Relegation group
10	Thanh Hoa	13	4	3	6	9	14	−5	15	Qualified to Relegation group
11	Song Lam Nghe An	13	4	3	6	10	16	−6	15	Qualified to Relegation group
12	Duoc Nam Ha Nam Dinh	13	4	1	8	14	23	−9	13	Qualified to Relegation group
13	Haiphong	13	3	4	6	8	17	−9	13	Qualified to Relegation group
14	Quang Nam	13	2	3	8	17	32	−15	9	Qualified to Relegation group

Updated to match(es) played on 1 October 2020. Source: VPF
Rules for classification: 1) Points; 2) Goal difference; 3) Goals scored; 4) Disciplinary points; 5) Play-off (Only to decide champions, runners-up, third placed and relegation spots); 6) Drawing of lots (Criteria 2 to 5 only applies after the conclusion of round 13)

== Phase 2 League Table ==
=== Championship Group ===
Pos	Team	Pld	W	D	L	GF	GA	GD	Pts	Qualification
1	Viettel (C)	20	12	5	3	29	16	+13	41	Qualification for AFC Champions League Group stage
2	Hanoi (Note: Hanoi FC is qualified for the 2021 AFC Cup Group stage as 2020 Vietnamese Cup winners.) (Q)	20	11	6	3	37	16	+21	39	Qualification for AFC Cup Group stage
3	Saigon (Q)	20	9	7	4	30	19	+11	34	Qualification for AFC Cup Group stage
4	Than Quang Ninh	20	9	4	7	27	26	+1	31	
5	Ho Chi Minh City	20	8	4	8	29	25	+4	28	
6	Becamex Binh Duong	20	7	7	6	25	21	+4	28	
7	Hoang Anh Gia Lai	20	6	5	9	27	36	−9	23	
8	Hong Linh Ha Tinh	20	4	8	8	19	24	−5	20	

Updated to match(es) played on 8 November 2020. Source: VPF
(C) Champion; (Q) Qualified to the phase indicated

=== Relegation Group ===
Pos	Team	Pld	W	D	L	GF	GA	GD	Pts	Relegation
9	SHB Da Nang	18	5	8	5	26	22	+4	23	
10	Song Lam Nghe An	18	6	5	7	17	21	−4	23	
11	Thanh Hoa	18	5	6	7	16	22	−6	21	
12	Haiphong	18	5	4	9	15	25	−10	19	
13	Duoc Nam Ha Nam Dinh	18	5	3	10	19	30	−11	18	
14	Quang Nam (R)	18	5	3	10	28	41	−13	18	Relegation to V.League 2

Updated to match(es) played on 31 October 2020. Source: VPF
(R) Relegated

== Results ==
Home \ Away	BBD	NDI	HAN	HPG	HAG	HHT	QNA	SGN	DNG	SLN	TQN	THH	HCM	VTL
Becamex Binh Duong			0–2	5–0	1–1			3–1	1–0			0–1		2–0
Duoc Nam Ha Nam Dinh	1–1			0–2		2–1	1–0		1–0	3–0				1–2
Hanoi		4–2		1–0	3–0			0–1		0–1		1–1	2–0	
Haiphong					0–0	1–1	1–1	0–2		3–1	0–1		0–0	
Hoang Anh Gia Lai		1–0				1–0	3–1	1–1			1–0		5–2	
Hong Linh Ha Tinh	1–1		1–1				3–2		0–0				1–0	0–1
Quang Nam	1–2		2–2					3–3		2–1		2–1	1–3	0–3
Saigon	0–0	3–0				1–1				0–0	0–0	3–0		
SHB Da Nang			1–1	1–0	3–1		6–1	1–4			1–2			
Song Lam Nghe An	1–0				2–0	1–1			1–0				1–3	1–2
Than Quang Ninh	2–2	3–2	3–1			0–2	3–1			2–0			0–3	
Thanh Hoa		1–0		0–1	0–0	1–2			0–3	0–0	2–0			
Ho Chi Minh City	1–2	5–1	0–3					0–1	2–2			1–0		3–0
Viettel			1–1	4–0	3–3			1–0	1–1		1–1	1–2		

Updated to match(es) played on 24 July 2020. Source: Vietnam Professional Football
Legend: Blue = home team win; Yellow = draw; Red = away team win.

== Positions by round ==
This table lists the positions of teams after each week of matches. In order to preserve the chronological evolution, any postponed matches are not included to the round at which they were originally scheduled, but added to the full round they were played immediately afterwards. For example, if a match is scheduled for matchday 13, but then postponed and played between days 16 and 17, it will be added to the standings for day 16.

Team ╲ Round	1	2	3	4	5	6	7	8	9	10	11	12	13
Saigon	7	2	5	1	4	5	2	1	1	1	1	1	1
Viettel	4	4	2	2	5	7	4	5	3	2	2	2	2
Than Quang Ninh	11	7	11	10	8	6	8	4	5	5	3	4	3
Hanoi	1	8	4	5	7	3	6	8	8	6	4	5	4
Ho Chi Minh City	2	1	1	6	3	1	1	2	2	3	5	3	5
Becamex Bình Dương	5	9	7	4	2	4	3	3	4	7	7	6	6
Hoang Anh Gia Lai	6	3	9	7	6	8	9	6	6	4	6	7	7
Hong Linh Ha Tinh	9	12	10	9	9	12	12	12	13	11	10	9	8
SHB Da Nang	10	14	14	12	11	10	11	7	7	9	9	8	9
Thanh Hoa	12	13	13	14	12	11	7	10	10	8	8	11	10
Song Lam Nghe An	8	6	3	3	1	2	5	9	9	10	11	10	11
Duoc Nam Ha Nam Dinh	13	10	12	13	14	14	13	14	11	12	12	12	12
Haiphong	3	5	6	8	10	9	10	11	12	13	13	13	13
Quang Nam	14	11	8	11	13	13	14	13	14	14	14	14	14

Championship Round
Relegation Round

Updated to match(es) played on 1 October 2020. Source: Table by round (in Vietnamese)

=== Championship round ===
Team ╲ Round	14	15	16	17	18	19	20
Viettel	2	1	1	1	1	1	1
Hanoi	4	3	2	2	3	2	2
Saigon	1	2	3	3	2	3	3
Than Quang Ninh	3	4	4	4	4	4	4
Ho Chi Minh City	5	6	6	6	5	5	5
Becamex Binh Duong	6	5	5	5	6	6	6
Hoang Anh Gia Lai	7	7	7	7	8	8	7
Hong Linh Ha Tinh	8	8	8	8	7	7	8

Champion and Qualification for AFC Champions League Group Stage
Qualification for AFC Cup group stage
Assured a place of the AFC Cup group stage

=== Relegation round ===
Team ╲ Round	14	15	16	17	18
Thanh Hoa	11	11	11	11	11
Song Lam Nghe An	10	9	10	10	10
SHB Da Nang	9	10	9	9	9
Duoc Nam Ha Nam Dinh	12	12	12	13	13
Haiphong	13	13	13	12	12
Quang Nam	14	14	14	14	14

Relegation to 2021 V.League 2

== Season progress ==
Team ╲ Round	1	2	3	4	5	6	7	8	9	10	11	12	13	14	15	16	17	18	19	20
Becamex Binh Duong	W	L	D	W	W	L	D	W	D	L	D	D	W	L	W	L	L	D	W	D
Duoc Nam Ha Nam Dinh	L	W	L	L	L	L	W	L	W	L	D	L	W	D	W	L	L	D	X	X
Hanoi	W	L	W	D	L	W	L	D	D	W	W	D	D	W	W	W	W	D	W	W
Haiphong	W	D	D	L	L	W	D	L	L	L	D	L	W	L	L	W	W	L	X	X
Hoang Anh Gia Lai	W	D	L	W	D	L	D	W	D	W	D	L	W	L	L	L	L	L	L	W
Hong Linh Ha Tinh	L	L	W	D	D	D	D	L	D	W	D	W	W	L	D	L	L	D	L	L
Quang Nam	L	D	W	L	L	L	L	W	L	L	D	D	L	L	L	W	W	W	X	X
Saigon	D	W	D	W	D	D	W	W	W	W	D	L	D	W	L	D	W	W	L	L
SHB Da Nang	L	L	L	W	D	W	D	W	D	L	D	W	L	W	L	W	L	D	X	X
Song Lam Nghe An	D	W	W	D	W	L	L	L	D	L	L	W	L	W	W	L	D	D	X	X
Than Quang Ninh	L	W	L	D	W	W	L	W	L	W	W	D	D	W	D	W	W	L	L	L
Thanh Hoa	L	L	L	D	W	W	W	L	L	W	D	L	D	D	W	L	D	D	X	X
Ho Chi Minh City	W	W	D	L	W	W	D	L	W	L	L	W	L	L	L	D	L	W	W	D
Viettel	W	D	W	D	L	L	W	D	W	W	D	W	L	W	W	W	W	D	W	W

Updated to match(es) played on 24 July 2020. Source: VPF
W = Win; D = Draw; L = Lose; X = Not played (for bottom 6 teams)

=== Schedule ===
- Details (in Vietnamese): https://vpf.vn/tai-lieu-vleague/vleague-thong-bao/lich-thi-dau-giai-vdqg-ls-2020/

== Attendances ==
=== By club ===
2020 V.League 1 Attendance
Club	Total	Games	Avg. Per Game
Becamex Binh Duong	35,200	7	5,028
Duoc Nam Ha Nam Dinh	112,000	9	12,444
Hanoi	45,000	9	5,000
Hoang Anh Gia Lai	54,500	8	6,812
Ho Chi Minh City	51,000	8	6,375
SHB Da Nang	44,700	8	5,587
Song Lam Nghe An	49,000	8	6,125
Hong Linh Ha Tinh	59,000	8	7,375
Quang Nam	35,000	9	3,888
Saigon	28,500	8	3,562
Haiphong	40,000	8	5,000
Thanh Hoa	48,000	10	4,800
Than Quang Ninh	46,000	10	4,600
Viettel	42,500	9	4,722
Total	689,400	119	5,793

=== By round ===
2020 V.League 1 Attendance
Round	Total	Games	Avg. Per Game
Round 1	0	7	0
Round 2	0	7	0
Round 3	50,500	7	7,214
Round 4	56,700	7	8,100
Round 5	50,000	7	7,142
Round 6	66,000	7	9,429
Round 7	48,000	7	6,857
Round 8	58,000	7	8,285
Round 9	73,000	7	10,429
Round 10	52.500	7	7,500
Round 11	63,000	7	9,000
Round 12	22,200	7	3,171
Round 13	35,000	7	5,000
Group A Round 14	15,000	4	3,750
Group B Round 14	11,000	3	3,667
Group A Round 15	16,500	4	4,125
Group B Round 15	11,000	3	3,667
Group A Round 16	14,000	4	3,500
Group B Round 16	9,500	3	3,167
Group A Round 17	16,500	4	4,125
Group B Round 17	21,000	3	7,000
Group A Round 18	?	4	?
Group B Round 18	?	3	?
Group A Round 19	?	4	?
Group A Round 20	?	4	?
Total	689,400	119	0

- Due to concerns about the COVID-19 epidemic, all 14 matches in the first 2 rounds were played without spectators.

== Season statistics ==
=== Top scorers ===
As of 6 November 2020.

Rank	Player	Club	Goals
1	(Jamaica) Rimario Gordon	Hanoi	12
1	(Brazil) Pedro Paulo	Saigon	12
3	(Jamaica) Chevaughn Walsh	Hoang Anh Gia Lai	10
3	(Brazil) Bruno Henrique	Hong Linh Ha Tinh	10
5	(Jamaica) Jermie Lynch	Than Quang Ninh	8
5	(Brazil) Geovane Magno	Saigon	8
5	(Brazil) Bruno Cantanhede	Viettel	8
8	(Uganda) Joseph Mpande	Haiphong	7
8	(Nigeria) Ismahil Akinade	SHB Da Nang	7

== See also ==
- 2020 V.League 2
- 2020 Vietnamese National Football Second League
- 2020 Vietnamese National Football Third League
