= 2022 V.League 1 =

66th season of the highest division of association football in Vietnam

Night Wolf V.League 1 – 2022
- Season: 2022
- Dates: 25 February – 19 November
- Champions: Hanoi FC; 6th VL1 title 6th Vietnamese title
- Relegated: Saigon FC
- Champions League: Hanoi FC; Haiphong FC
- Matches: 156
- Goals: 380 (2.44 per match)
- Top goalscorer: Rimario Gordon (17 goals)
- Biggest home win: Dong A Thanh Hoa 4–0 Saigon FC (16 July); Viettel 4–0 Nam Dinh (15 September); Hanoi FC 5–1 Becamex Binh Duong (1 October)
- Biggest away win: Ho Chi Minh City FC 0–6 Hanoi FC (19 October)
- Highest scoring: Hong Linh Ha Tinh 3–4 Saigon FC (30 July); Haiphong FC 4–3 Ho Chi Minh City FC (26 August); Hanoi FC 5–2 Nam Dinh FC (15 October)
- Longest winning run: Hanoi FC (7 matches)
- Longest unbeaten run: Haiphong FC (14 matches)
- Longest winless run: Hong Linh Ha Tinh (11 matches)
- Longest losing run: Ho Chi Minh City FC; Saigon FC; SHB Da Nang (4 matches)
- Highest attendance: 22,000; Haiphong FC 3–2 Hanoi FC (23 October)
- Lowest attendance: 1,000; Hong Linh Ha Tinh 0–1 Haiphong FC (25 February)
- Total attendance: 979,500
- Average attendance: 6,402 (excluding matches played behind closed doors)
- All statistics correct as of complete.

The 2022 V.League 1, known as the Night Wolf V.League 1 (Vietnamese: Giải bóng đá Vô địch Quốc gia Night Wolf 2022) for sponsorship reasons, was the 39th season of the V.League 1, the highest division of Vietnamese football and the 22nd as a professional league. The season started on 25 February 2022, and ended on 20 November.

There was no defending champion as a result of the previous season being abandoned due to the COVID-19 pandemic.

There was a break from 14 March until 2 July to accommodate for the 2022 FIFA World Cup qualification and the delayed 2021 Southeast Asian Games.

Hanoi FC won their 6th league title on 13 November with one match to spare.

== Changes from the previous season ==
Due to the previous season being abandoned, no teams were promoted or relegated from the 2021 season. All but one club from the 2021 season contested in the league. Than Quang Ninh were not permitted to participate due to financial reasons, leaving the league starting with just 13 clubs.

=== From V.League 1 ===
Dissolved

- ~~Than Quang Ninh~~

== Teams ==
Locations of the 2022 V.League 1 teams

=== Stadiums and locations ===
Team	Location	Stadium	Capacity
Topenland Binh Dinh	Binh Dinh	Quy Nhon	15,000
Becamex Binh Duong	Binh Duong	Go Dau	13,035
SHB Da Nang	Da Nang	Hoa Xuan	20,000
Hoang Anh Gia Lai	Gia Lai	Pleiku	12,000
Haiphong FC	Haiphong	Lach Tray	30,000
Hanoi FC	Hanoi	Hang Day	22,500
Viettel	Hanoi	Hang Day	22,500
Hong Linh Ha Tinh	Ha Tinh	Ha Tinh	20,000
Ho Chi Minh City FC	Ho Chi Minh City	Thong Nhat	16,000
Saigon FC	Ho Chi Minh City	Thong Nhat	16,000
Nam Dinh FC	Nam Dinh	Thien Truong	30,000
Song Lam Nghe An	Nghe An	Vinh	18,000
Dong A Thanh Hoa	Thanh Hoa	Thanh Hoa	12,000

=== Personnel and kits ===
Note: Flags indicate national team as has been defined under FIFA eligibility rules. Players may hold more than one non-FIFA nationality.

Team	Manager	Captain	Kit manufacturer
Topenland Binh Dinh	(Vietnam) Nguyễn Đức Thắng	(Vietnam) Hồ Tấn Tài	(Vietnam) Kamito
Becamex Binh Duong	(Vietnam) Lư Đình Tuấn	(Vietnam) Tô Văn Vũ	(Vietnam) Kamito
SHB Da Nang	(Vietnam) Phan Thanh Hùng	(Vietnam) Hoàng Minh Tâm	(Vietnam) Kamito
Hoang Anh Gia Lai	(Thailand) Kiatisuk Senamuang	(Vietnam) Lương Xuân Trường	(Japan) Mizuno
Haiphong	(Vietnam) Chu Đình Nghiêm	(Vietnam) Nguyễn Hải Huy	(Japan) Jogarbola
Hanoi	(South Korea) Chun Jae-ho (interim)	(Vietnam) Nguyễn Văn Quyết	(Japan) Jogarbola
Viettel	(South Korea) Bae Ji-won	(Vietnam) Bùi Tiến Dũng	(China) Li-Ning
Hong Linh Ha Tinh	(Vietnam) Nguyễn Thành Công	(Vietnam) Trần Phi Sơn	(Thailand) Grand Sport
Ho Chi Minh City	(Vietnam) Vũ Tiến Thành (interim)	(Vietnam) Sầm Ngọc Đức	(Spain) Kelme
Saigon	(Vietnam) Phùng Thanh Phương	(Vietnam) Cao Văn Triền	(Spain) Kelme
Nam Dinh	(Vietnam) Vũ Hồng Việt	(Vietnam) Nguyễn Hạ Long	(Spain) Kelme
Song Lam Nghe An	(Vietnam) Nguyễn Huy Hoàng	(Vietnam) Quế Ngọc Hải	(Thailand) Grand Sport
Dong A Thanh Hoa	(Serbia) Svetislav Tanasijević (caretaker)	(Vietnam) Lê Văn Thắng	(Japan) Jogarbola

=== Managerial changes ===
Team	Outgoing manager	Manner of departure	Date of vacancy	Position in table	Incoming manager	Date of appointment
Ho Chi Minh City	(Brazil) Alexandré Pölking	Contract not renewed	27 September 2021	Pre-season	(Vietnam) Trần Minh Chiến	29 September 2021
Haiphong	(Vietnam) Phạm Anh Tuấn	Contract not renewed	October 2021	Pre-season	(Vietnam) Chu Đình Nghiêm	6 October 2021
Becamex Binh Duong	(Vietnam) Nguyễn Thanh Sơn	Interim period over	October 2021	Pre-season	(Vietnam) Đặng Trần Chỉnh	15 October 2021
Hanoi	(South Korea) Park Choong-kyun	Resigned	19 February 2022	Pre-season	(South Korea) Chun Jae-ho (interim)	19 February 2022
Viettel	(Vietnam) Trương Việt Hoàng	Demoted	12 July 2022	7th	(South Korea) Bae Ji-won	15 July 2022
Becamex Binh Duong	(Vietnam) Đặng Trần Chỉnh	Reorganized	1 August 2022	10th	(Vietnam) Lư Đình Tuấn	1 August 2022
Ho Chi Minh City	(Vietnam) Trần Minh Chiến	Reorganized	8 August 2022	12th	(Vietnam) Nguyễn Hữu Thắng (caretaker)	8 August 2022
Ho Chi Minh City	(Vietnam) Nguyễn Hữu Thắng (caretaker)	End of caretaker spell	23 August 2022	11th	(Vietnam) Trương Việt Hoàng	23 August 2022
Nam Dinh	(Vietnam) Nguyễn Văn Sỹ	Sacked	24 August 2022	12th	(Vietnam) Vũ Hồng Việt	24 August 2022
Ho Chi Minh City	(Vietnam) Trương Việt Hoàng	Resigned	1 October 2022	13th	(Vietnam) Vũ Tiến Thành	2 October 2022
Dong A Thanh Hoa	(Serbia) Ljupko Petrović	Medical reasons	6 November 2022	6th	(Serbia) Svetislav Tanasijević (caretaker)	6 November 2022

== Foreign players ==
Players name in bold indicates the player was registered after the start of the season.

Club	Player 1	Player 2	Player 3	Player 4 (AFC Player)	Player 5 (Naturalized Vietnamese player)	Former Players
Topenland Binh Dinh	(Brazil) Hêndrio	(Brazil) Rafaelson	(Jamaica) Jermie Lynch		(Germany) → (Vietnam) Adriano Schmidt^{1} (Russia) → (Vietnam) **Đặng Văn Lâm**^{1}	
Becamex Binh Duong	(Brazil) Eydison	(Brazil) **Wellington Adão**	(Senegal) Guy N'Diaye		(Brazil) → (Vietnam) **Kesley Alves**	(Burkina Faso) Abass Guiro (The Gambia) Dawda Ceesay
SHB Da Nang	(Brazil) **Claudir**	(Brazil) **Erick Luis**	(Brazil) **Walisson Maia**			(Serbia) Ivan Marić (Nigeria) Christian Osaguona^{INJ} (Serbia) Damir Memović (France) Aboubakar Koné
Hoang Anh Gia Lai	(Brazil) **Bruno Henrique**	(Brazil) Maurício	(Brazil) Washington Brandão	(South Korea) **An Sae-hee**		(Brazil) Jefferson Baiano (South Korea) Kim Dong-su
Haiphong	(Jamaica) Rimario Gordon	(Uganda) Joseph Mpande	(Uganda) Moses Oloya		(Australia) → (Vietnam) Martin Lo^{1}	
Hanoi	(Brazil) **Lucão**	(Croatia) **Tonći Mujan**	(Serbia) Vladimir Silađi			(Serbia) Đuro Zec^{INJ} (Croatia) Josip Ivančić
Viettel	(Brazil) Caíque	(Brazil) Geovane	(Brazil) Pedro Paulo	(Uzbekistan) Jahongir Abdumuminov		
Hong Linh Ha Tinh	(Brazil) Janclesio	(Brazil) Paollo	(Brazil) **Dionatan Machado**			(Ghana) Zakaria Suraka^{INJ} (Ghana) Abdul Basit
Ho Chi Minh City	(Brazil) Brendon Lucas	(Jamaica) **Daniel Green**	(Jamaica) **Atapharoy Bygrave**		(Nigeria) → (Vietnam) Hoàng Vũ Samson (United States) → (Vietnam) **Lee Nguyen**^{1}	(Brazil) Bruno Cosendey (Brazil) Maurício Cordeiro
Saigon	(Brazil) **Matheus**	(Australia) **Nicholas Olsen**	(France) Rodrigue Nanitelamio		(Argentina) → (Vietnam) Gastón Merlo	(South Korea) Ahn Byung-keon (Brazil) Gustavo Santos (Portugal) André Vieira
Nam Dinh	(Brazil) Alisson	(United States) **Victor Mansaray**	(Brazil) Rodrigo Dias		(Uganda) → (Vietnam) Geoffrey Kizito (United States) → (Vietnam) **Steven Dang**^{1}	(Brazil) Márcio Marques (Ukraine) Yevhen Bokhashvili (Jamaica) Andre Fagan
Song Lam Nghe An	(Spain) **Mario Arqués**	(Nigeria) Michael Olaha	(Nigeria) Ganiyu Oseni		(Brazil) → (Vietnam) Thiago Papel	(Ghana) Abdul Basit (Cameroon) Mark O'Ojong^{INJ}
Dong A Thanh Hoa	(Brazil) Zé Paulo	(Brazil) **Gustavo Sant'Ana**	(Brazil) **Gustavo Santos**			(Serbia) Igor Jelić (Brazil) Paulo Henrique (Zimbabwe) Victor Kamhuka

- **^1** Naturalized players whose parents or grandparents were born in Vietnam, thus are regarded as local players.
- **^INJ** Player withdrew from the squad due to an injury.

== Standings ==
=== League table ===
Pos	Team	Pld	W	D	L	GF	GA	GD	Pts	Qualification or relegation
1	Hanoi (C)	24	15	6	3	47	21	+26	51	Qualification for AFC Champions League group stage
2	Haiphong	24	14	6	4	39	26	+13	48	Qualification for AFC Champions League play-off round (Note: Since Hanoi qualified for the AFC Champions League group stage as the league winners and won the Vietnamese Cup, Haiphong will participate in the AFC Champions League Qualifying play-offs or AFC Cup group stage and the standy position will be passed down to the league third-placed team.)
3	Topenland Binh Dinh	24	14	5	5	37	22	+15	47	
4	Viettel	24	11	6	7	29	14	+15	39	
5	Song Lam Nghe An	24	9	6	9	29	28	+1	33	
6	Hoang Anh Gia Lai	24	7	11	6	26	24	+2	32	
7	Becamex Binh Duong	24	7	7	10	32	41	−9	28 (Note: Head-to-head points: Becamex Binh Duong 6, Dong A Thanh Hoa 0.)	
8	Dong A Thanh Hoa	24	8	4	12	27	27	0	28	
9	Ho Chi Minh City	24	6	7	11	23	34	−11	25 (Note: Head-to-head points: Ho Chi Minh City FC 4, SHB Danang 1.)	
10	SHB Da Nang	24	6	7	11	18	35	−17	25	
11	Hong Linh Ha Tinh	24	5	9	10	26	33	−7	24	
12	Nam Dinh	24	6	5	13	21	33	−12	23	
13	Saigon (R)	24	5	7	12	26	42	−16	22	Relegation to V.League 2

Source: VPF
Rules for classification: 1) Points; 2) Head-to-head points 3) Goal difference; 4) Goals scored; 5) Disciplinary points; 6) Play-off (Only to decide champions, runners-up, third placed and relegation spots); 7) Drawing of lots
(C) Champions; (R) Relegated

=== Positions by round ===
This table lists the positions of teams after each week of matches.

Team ╲ Round	1	2	3	4	5	6	7	8	9	10	11	12	13	14	15	16	17	18	19	20	21	22	23	24	25	26
Hanoi FC	3	2	2	2	3	2	4	2	1	1	1	1	1	1	1	1	1	1	1	1	1	1	1	1	1	1
Haiphong	2	1	1	1	1	1	2	1	4	5	4	4	3	3	3	3	3	4	2	2	2	2	2	2	2	2
Topenland Binh Dinh	13	6	7	5	6	4	3	5	7	6	6	5	4	2	2	2	4	2	4	4	3	3	3	3	3	3
Viettel	1	3	3	3	4	7	5	7	5	7	7	6	5	4	4	4	2	3	3	3	4	4	4	4	4	4
Song Lam Nghe An	4	4	4	4	5	3	1	3	2	2	3	2	2	5	5	5	6	6	5	5	6	6	5	5	5	5
Hoang Anh Gia Lai	7	8	11	9	11	8	6	4	3	3	2	3	6	6	6	6	5	7	8	8	8	8	7	7	6	6
Dong A Thanh Hoa	11	13	12	7	10	11	8	10	10	8	8	8	8	8	7	8	7	5	6	6	5	5	6	6	7	7
Becamex Binh Duong	10	5	5	6	2	6	7	9	9	10	9	9	9	9	8	7	9	8	7	7	7	7	8	8	8	8
Ho Chi Minh City	9	10	8	8	7	9	11	12	12	11	12	12	11	12	12	12	13	12	12	13	13	10	10	10	9	9
SHB Danang	6	7	6	10	8	10	10	8	6	4	5	7	7	7	10	9	10	10	10	9	9	9	9	9	10	10
Hong Linh Ha Tinh	12	12	10	13	9	5	9	6	8	9	10	10	10	10	11	11	11	11	11	12	12	12	11	11	12	11
Nam Dinh FC	8	11	9	11	12	12	12	11	11	12	11	11	12	11	9	10	8	9	9	11	10	11	12	12	11	12
Saigon FC	5	9	13	12	13	13	13	13	13	13	13	13	13	13	13	13	12	13	13	10	11	13	13	13	13	13

Winner and qualification to the Champions League group stage
Qualification to the Champions League play-off round
Relegate to V.League 2

Source: Table by round (in Vietnamese)

== Results ==
Home \ Away	BBD	DTH	HPG	HAN	HGL	HCM	HHT	NDI	SGN	SDN	SNA	TBD	VTL
Becamex Binh Duong	—	4–2	2–2	0–3	1–1	0–0	2–2	1–1	2–1	2–2	0–1	2–3	2–1
Dong A Thanh Hoa	0–1	—	0–1	1–1	2–3	1–2	2–0	1–1	4–0	3–0	2–0	2–1	1–0
Haiphong	2–1	1–1	—	3–2	1–1	4–3	1–1	2–1	3–1	1–0	4–1	3–1	1–2
Hanoi	5–1	1–0	2–1	—	2–1	0–0	2–0	5–2	3–1	3–0	2–1	0–3	1–0
Hoang Anh Gia Lai	2–1	2–0	1–2	1–1	—	1–2	0–0	2–0	1–1	1–0	1–2	1–1	2–2
Ho Chi Minh City	1–1	1–0	2–1	0–6	0–2	—	1–2	0–1	0–2	3–0	2–2	1–2	0–0
Hong Linh Ha Tinh	3–1	1–2	0–1	1–2	1–1	1–1	—	2–0	3–4	1–1	1–1	1–3	0–0
Nam Dinh	0–1	0–1	0–1	1–1	0–0	2–1	2–0	—	3–0	2–1	0–1	0–2	1–0
Saigon	2–1	0–1	0–1	1–1	0–1	1–2	3–2	2–2	—	2–2	1–1	1–1	1–1
SHB Da Nang	0–4	1–0	0–2	2–1	0–0	0–0	1–1	1–0	1–0	—	3–1	0–1	0–2
Song Lam Nghe An	3–0	0–0	3–0	1–1	2–0	2–0	1–0	2–1	1–2	2–2	—	1–2	0–1
Topenland Binh Dinh	4–1	2–1	0–0	0–1	1–1	1–2	2–1	2–1	3–0	0–1	1–0	—	0–2
Viettel	0–1	3–1	1–1	0–1	2–0	1–0	0–1	4–0	2–0	3–0	2–0	0–0	—

Source: Vietnam Professional Football
Legend: Blue = home team win; Yellow = draw; Red = away team win.

== Season statistics ==
=== Top scorers ===
Rank	Player	Club	Goals
1	(Jamaica) Rimario Gordon	Haiphong	17
2	(Vietnam) Phạm Tuấn Hải	Hanoi	10
3	(Brazil) Geovane Magno	Viettel	9
3	(Vietnam) Nguyễn Tiến Linh	Becamex Binh Duong	9
3	(Brazil) Zé Paulo	Dong A Thanh Hoa	9
6	(Jamaica) Jermie Lynch	Topenland Binh Dinh	8
6	(Brazil) Lucão do Break	Hanoi	8
6	(Brazil) Paollo	Hong Linh Ha Tinh	8
9	5 players		7

Source: Soccerway

==== Hat-tricks ====
Player	For	Against	Result	Date
(Brazil) Rafaelson	Topenland Binh Dinh	Hanoi	3–0 (A)	2 September 2022
(Brazil) Rodrigo Dias	Nam Dinh	Saigon	3–0 (H)	13 November 2022

=== Clean sheets ===
Rank	Player	Club	Clean sheets
1	(Vietnam) Trần Nguyên Mạnh	Viettel	9
2	(Vietnam) Đặng Văn Lâm	Topenland Binh Dinh	7
2	(Vietnam) Nguyễn Đình Triệu	Haiphong	7
2	(Vietnam) Nguyễn Thanh Diệp	Dong A Thanh Hoa	7
2	(Vietnam) Nguyễn Văn Hoàng	Song Lam Nghe An	7
6	(Vietnam) Nguyễn Văn Công	Hanoi	5
7	5 players		4

== Attendances ==
Pos	Team	Total	High	Low	Average	Change
1	Nam Dinh FC	132,000	19,000	5,000	11,000	+161.9%
2	Haiphong FC	116,639	22,000	4,000	9,719	+114.4%^{2}
4	Hanoi FC	95,500	14,000	3,000	7,958	+144.9%
3	Topenland Binh Dinh	100,000	16,000	4,000	8,333	−37.1%
5	Hoang Anh Gia Lai	70,000	10,000	4,000	7,000	−22.2%^{1}
6	Song Lam Nghe An	77,000	16,000	2,000	6,417	+94.5%
7	Becamex Binh Duong	62,700	8,500	3,000	5,225	+24.4%
8	Hong Linh Ha Tinh	62,500	10,000	1,000	5,208	+24.0%
9	Dong A Thanh Hoa	61,000	8,000	3,500	5,083	−36.5%
10	SHB Danang	57,800	8,000	2,000	4,817	−37.2%
11	Viettel	54,000	8,000	2,000	4,500	+73.1%
12	Saigon FC	47,500	7,000	2,500	3,958	−26.4%
13	Ho Chi Minh City FC	47,000	7,000	2,000	3,917	−13.0%
	League total	979,500	22,000	1,000	6,402	+3.1%

Updated to games played on complete
Source: League attendance
Notes:
1: Played two matches behind closed doors due to local COVID-19 restrictions.
2: Played one match behind closed doors due to a fan assaulting a match official at the end of their 19 July match against Topenland Binh Dinh.

== Awards ==
=== Monthly awards ===
Month	Manager of the Month		Player of the Month		Goal of the Month	
Month	Manager	Club	Player	Club	Player	Club
March	(Vietnam) Chu Đình Nghiêm	Haiphong	(Jamaica) Rimario Gordon	Haiphong	(Vietnam) Phan Văn Đức	Song Lam Nghe An
July	(Thailand) Kiatisuk Senamuang	Hoang Anh Gia Lai	(Vietnam) Nguyễn Văn Tòan	Hoang Anh Gia Lai	(Vietnam) Phan Văn Đức	Song Lam Nghe An
August	(South Korea) Chun Jae-ho	Hanoi	(Vietnam) Nguyễn Văn Quyết	Hanoi	(Vietnam) Ngô Hoàng Thịnh	Ho Chi Minh City
September	(Vietnam) Nguyễn Đức Thắng	Topenland Binh Dinh	(Vietnam) Nguyễn Hoàng Đức	Viettel	(Vietnam) Nguyễn Hoàng Đức	Viettel
October	(Vietnam) Chu Đình Nghiêm	Haiphong	(Vietnam) Phạm Tuấn Hải	Hanoi	(Vietnam) Phạm Tuấn Hải	Hanoi

=== Annual awards ===
Award	Winner	Club
Manager of the Year	(Vietnam) Chu Dinh Nghiem	Haiphong FC
Player of the Year	(Vietnam) Nguyễn Văn Quyết	Hanoi
Best Young Player	(Vietnam) Nguyễn Phi Hoàng	SHB Da Nang
Goal of the Year	(Vietnam) Phạm Tuấn Hải	Hanoi

Best XI
Goalkeeper	(Vietnam) Trần Nguyên Mạnh (Viettel)			
Defenders	(Vietnam) Hồ Tấn Tài (Topenland Binh Dinh)	(Vietnam) Nguyễn Thanh Bình (Viettel)	(Vietnam) Nguyễn Thành Chung (Hanoi)	(Vietnam) Đàm Tiến Dũng (Dong A Thanh Hoa)
Midfielders	(Vietnam) Đỗ Hùng Dũng (Hanoi)		(Vietnam) Nguyễn Hoàng Đức (Viettel)	(Vietnam) Nguyễn Hải Huy (Haiphong)
Forwards	(Vietnam) Nguyễn Văn Quyết (Hanoi)		(Jamaica) Rimario Gordon (Haiphong)	(Vietnam) Phạm Tuấn Hải (Hanoi)
