= Damir Memović =

Serbian footballer

Personal information
- Full name: Damir Memović
- Date of birth: 19 January 1989 (age 37)
- Place of birth: Belgrade, SFR Yugoslavia
- Height: 1.91 m (6 ft 3 in)
- Position: Centre-back

Senior career*
Years	Team	Apps	(Gls)
2009	Hajduk Beograd		
2009–2013	Sinđelić Beograd		
2013–2014	Dolina Padina	27	(4)
2014–2015	Drina Zvornik	23	(2)
2015–2018	Gandzasar Kapan	71	(3)
2018	Zvijezda 09	8	(0)
2019	Song Lam Nghe An	25	(1)
2020–2021	Hoang Anh Gia Lai	30	(2)
2022	SHB Da Nang	3	(0)
- * Club domestic league appearances and goals as of 12 March 2022

Damir Memović (born 19 January 1989) is a Serbian professional footballer who plays as a defender. He is currently a free agent, and last played for V.League 1 club SHB Da Nang.

== Career ==
On 31 July 2015, Memović was presented as a new signing for Gandzasar Kapan in the Armenian Premier League.

After signing with Zvijezda 09 in September 2018, he left the club again at the end of the year, where his contract expired.

In 2019, he moved to Vietnam to play for Song Lam Nghe An and later joined Hoang Anh Gia Lai FC.

== Career statistics ==
As of match played 11 April 2022

Appearances and goals by club, season and competition
Club	Season	League			National Cup		Continental		Total	
Club	Season	Division	Apps	Goals	Apps	Goals	Apps	Goals	Apps	Goals
Dolina Padina	2013–14	Serbian First League	27	4			—		27	4
Drina Zvornik	2014–15	Premier League of Bosnia and Herzegovina	23	2	1	0	—		24	2
Gandzasar Kapan	2015–16	Armenian Premier League	23	2	4	0	—		27	1
Gandzasar Kapan	2016–17	Armenian Premier League	29	1	1	0	—		30	1
Gandzasar Kapan	2017–18	Armenian Premier League	19	0	5	0	2 (Note: Appearances in UEFA Europa League)	0	26	0
Gandzasar Kapan	Total		71	3	10	0	2	0	84	3
Zvijezda 09	2018–19	Premier League of Bosnia and Herzegovina	8	0			—		8	0
Song Lam Nghe An	2019	V.League 1	25	1	1	1	—		26	2
Hoang Anh Gia Lai	2020	V.League 1	19	2	0	0	—		19	2
Hoang Anh Gia Lai	2021	V.League 1	11	0	0	0	—		11	0
Hoang Anh Gia Lai	Total		30	2	0	0	0	0	30	2
SHB Da Nang	2022	V.League 1	3	0	1	0	—		4	0
Career total			187	12	13	1	2	0	202	13

== Honours ==
Gandzasar Kapan

- Armenian Cup: 2017–18
