= Gustavo (footballer, born 1995) =

Brazilian-Vietnamese footballer (born 1995)

Gustavo Sant'Ana Santos Đỗ Phi Long
Personal information
- Full name: Đỗ Phi Long
- Birth name: Gustavo Sant'Ana Santos
- Date of birth: 23 February 1995 (age 31)
- Place of birth: São Paulo, Brazil
- Height: 1.95 m (6 ft 5 in)
- Position: Center-back

Team information
- Current team: Công An Nhân Dân
- Number: 95

Youth career
- –2014: Atlético Diadema

Senior career*
Years	Team	Apps	(Gls)
2014–2017	Atlético Diadema	31	(2)
2018	Bandeirante	18	(2)
2019	Viettel	9	(0)
2019	Sài Gòn	12	(0)
2020	Sông Lam Nghệ An	17	(2)
2021	Than Quảng Ninh	11	(0)
2022	Grêmio Anápolis	4	(0)
2022–2025	Đông Á Thanh Hóa	52	(6)
2025–2026	SHB Đà Nẵng	13	(0)
2026–	Công An Nhân Dân	5	(2)
- * Club domestic league appearances and goals as of 27 October 2026

Gustavo Sant'Ana Santos (born 23 February 1995), commonly known as Gustavo, and also as Đỗ Phi Long, is a Brazilian professional footballer who plays as a center-back for V.League 2 club Công An Nhân Dân.

== Club career ==
In 2019, Gustavo joined Viettel for a half of 2019 V.League 1 season, he played 9 games.

Later in the year, Gustavo joined Sài Gòn for the second half of 2019 V.League 1 season, he played 12 games.

In 2020, Gustavo joined Sông Lam Nghệ An for 2020 V.League 1 season, he played totally 17 games and scored 2 goals.

In 2021, Gustavo joined Than Quảng Ninh for "Covid" season - 2021 V.League 1 season, he played 11 games.

In January 2022, Gustavo joined Grêmio Esportivo Anápolis for a half of Brasil Série D season, he played totally 5 games.

On 21 July 2022, Gustavo joined Đông Á Thanh Hóa in V.League 1. There he captained the team and won two Vietnamese National Cup titles.

In September 2026, Gustavo was transferred to V.League 2 club Công An Nhân Dân.

== Career statistics ==
As of 7 June 2026

Appearances and goals by club, season and competition
Club	Season	League			State league		National cup		Other		Total	
Club	Season	Division	Apps	Goals	Apps	Goals	Apps	Goals	Apps	Goals	Apps	Goals
Atlético Diadema	2014	Campeonato Paulista Segunda Divisão	—		4	0	—		—		4	0
Atlético Diadema	2015	Campeonato Paulista Segunda Divisão	—		2	0	—		—		2	0
Atlético Diadema	2016	Campeonato Paulista Segunda Divisão	—		16	2	—		—		16	2
Atlético Diadema	2017	Campeonato Paulista Segunda Divisão	—		9	0	—		—		9	0
Atlético Diadema	Total		—		31	2	—		—		31	2
Bandeirante	2018	Campeonato Paulista Segunda Divisão	—		18	2	—		—		18	2
Viettel	2019	V.League 1	9	0	—		0	0	—		9	0
Saigon	2019	V.League 1	12	0	—		1	0	—		13	0
Song Lam Nghe An	2020	V.League 1	17	2	—		0	0	—		17	2
Than Quang Ninh	2021	V.League 1	11	0	—		0	0	—		11	0
Grêmio Anápolis	2022	Campeonato Goiano	—		4	0	—		—		4	0
Dong A Thanh Hoa	2022	V.League 1	13	0	—		1	0	—		14	0
Dong A Thanh Hoa	2023	V.League 1	17	4	—		1	0	—		18	4
Dong A Thanh Hoa	2023–24	V.League 1	7	0	—		2	0	1 (Note: Appearance in Vietnamese Super Cup)	1	8	1
Dong A Thanh Hoa	2024–25	V.League 1	15	2	—		1	0	4 (Note: One appearance in Vietnamese Super Cup, three appearances in ASEAN Club Championship)	0	16	2
Dong A Thanh Hoa	Total		52	6	—		5	0	5	1	62	7
SHB Da Nang	2025–26	V.League 1	13	0	—		1	0	—		14	0
Career total			114	8	53	4	7	0	5	1	179	13

== Honours ==
Đông Á Thanh Hóa

- Vietnamese Cup: 2023, 2023–24
- Vietnamese Super Cup: 2023, runners-up: 2024
