= Hồ Khắc Ngọc =

Vietnamese footballer (born 1992)

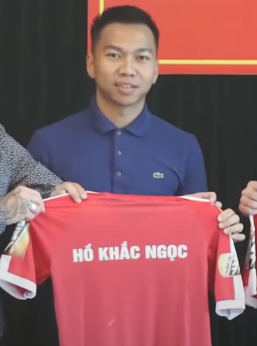
- Khắc Ngọc in 2019

Personal information
- Full name: Hồ Khắc Ngọc
- Date of birth: August 2, 1992 (age 34)
- Place of birth: Vinh, Nghệ An, Vietnam
- Height: 1.70 m (5 ft 7 in)
- Position: Central midfielder

Team information
- Current team: Sông Lam Nghệ An
- Number: 32

Youth career
- 2005–2011: Sông Lam Nghệ An

Senior career*
Years	Team	Apps	(Gls)
2012–2019	Sông Lam Nghệ An	120	(11)
2019–2022	Viettel	37	(3)
2023–2024	Thép Xanh Nam Định	37	(2)
2025–	Sông Lam Nghệ An	36	(2)

International career
2018–2019	Vietnam	1	(0)
- * Club domestic league appearances and goals as of 7 June 2026

Hồ Khắc Ngọc (born 2 August 1992) is a Vietnamese professional footballer who plays as a central midfielder for V.League 1 club Sông Lam Nghệ An.

Despite having several injuries throughout his career, Khắc Ngọc is known to be an intelligent passer with an 89% passing accuracy in the 2018 season. He also holds the record for the most corner kicks taken in a V-League season.

== Honours ==
Sông Lam Nghệ An

- Vietnamese Cup: 2017

Viettel

- V.League 1: 2020

Thép Xanh Nam Định

- V.League 1: 2023–24
- Vietnamese Super Cup: 2024
