= Steven Dang =

American soccer player

Personal information
- Full name: Steven Dang
- Date of birth: July 21, 1997 (age 29)
- Place of birth: Plano, Texas, United States
- Height: 1.82 m (6 ft 0 in)
- Position: Defender

Team information
- Current team: SHB Da Nang
- Number: 36

College career
Years	Team	Apps	(Gls)
2015–2018	UMHB Crusaders	75	(4)

Senior career*
Years	Team	Apps	(Gls)
2020–2021	Hoang Anh Gia Lai	0	(0)
2022	Nam Dinh	0	(0)
2023	Becamex Bình Dương	4	(0)
2023–	SHB Da Nang	0	(0)
- * Club domestic league appearances and goals as of June 1, 2023

Steven Dang (Vietnamese: Đặng Thanh Hoàng; born July 21, 1997) is an American soccer player who plays as a defender for V.League 2 club SHB Da Nang.

== Personal life ==
Dang was born in the United States but holds a Vietnamese passport through his parents. He was studied nursing at University of Mary Hardin-Baylor.

== Career statistics ==
As of June 1, 2023.

Club	Season	League			Cup		Continental		Other		Total	
Club	Season	Division	Apps	Goals	Apps	Goals	Apps	Goals	Apps	Goals	Apps	Goals
Hoang Anh Gia Lai	2021	V.League 1	0	0	0	0	0	0	0	0	0	0
Nam Dinh	2022	V.League 1	0	0	0	0	0	0	0	0	0	0
Becamex Binh Duong	2023	V.League 1	4	0	0	0	0	0	0	0	4	0
SHB Da Nang	2023–24	V.League 2	0	0	0	0	0	0	0	0	0	0
Career total			4	0	0	0	0	0	0	0	4	0

== Honors ==
SHB Đà Nẵng

- V.League 2: 2023–24
