= Hêdipo =

Brazilian footballer (born 1988)

Hédipo
Personal information
- Full name: Hédipo Gustavo da Conceiçao
- Date of birth: 7 February 1988 (age 38)
- Place of birth: Ibirama, Brazil
- Height: 1.74 m (5 ft 9 in)
- Position: Attacking midfielder

Senior career*
| Years | Team | Apps | (Gls) |
| 2009 | Sinop | | |
| 2010–2013 | Marcílio Dias | | |
| 2014 | Juazeiro | | |
| 2014 | São Carlos | | |
| 2014–2016 | Shan United | | |
| 2016–2017 | Persela Lamongan | | |
| 2017 | Feronikeli | | |
| 2017 | Southern Myanmar | 8 | (3) |
| 2018 | Rosario | | |
| 2018 | Boavista Timor-Leste | | |
| 2019 | Shan United | 9 | (4) |
| 2019 | Kalteng Putra | 12 | (5) |
| 2019 | Bhayangkara | 5 | (0) |
| 2019–2020 | Becamex Binh Duong | 17 | (5) |
| 2021 | SHB Da Nang | 1 | (0) |
| 2021–2022 | Persipura Jayapura | 9 | (0) |
| 2023 | Pattani | 0 | (0) |
- * Club domestic league appearances and goals as of 16 January 2022

Hédipo Gustavo da Conceiçao (born 7 February 1988), commonly known as Hédipo, is a Brazilian professional footballer who plays as an attacking midfielder.

== Career statistics ==
=== Club ===
As of 16 January 2022.

| Club | Season | League | | | Cup | | Continental | | Other | | Total | |
| Club | Season | Division | Apps | Goals | Apps | Goals | Apps | Goals | Apps | Goals | Apps | Goals |
|---|---|---|---|---|---|---|---|---|---|---|---|---|
| Juazeiro | 2014 | – | | | 0 | 0 | – | | 7 (Note: Appearances in the Campeonato Baiano) | 0 | 7 | 0 |
| São Carlos | 2014 | – | | | 0 | 0 | – | | 9 (Note: Appearances in the Campeonato Paulista A3) | 0 | 9 | 0 |
| Southern Myanmar | 2017 | Myanmar National League | 8 | 3 | 0 | 0 | – | | 0 | 0 | 8 | 3 |
| Shan United | 2019 | Myanmar National League | 9 | 4 | 1 | 0 | 5 (Note: Appearances in the AFC Cup) | 1 | 0 | 0 | 15 | 5 |
| Kalteng Putra | 2019 | Liga 1 | 12 | 5 | 0 | 0 | – | | 0 | 0 | 12 | 5 |
| Bhayangkara | 2019 | Liga 1 | 5 | 0 | 0 | 0 | – | | 0 | 0 | 5 | 0 |
| Becamex Binh Duong | 2020 | V.League 1 | 17 | 5 | 0 | 0 | – | | 0 | 0 | 17 | 5 |
| Da Nang | 2021 | V.League 1 | 1 | 0 | 0 | 0 | – | | 0 | 0 | 1 | 0 |
| Persipura Jayapura | 2021 | Liga 1 | 9 | 0 | 0 | 0 | – | | 0 | 0 | 9 | 0 |
| Career total | | | 61 | 17 | 1 | 0 | 5 | 1 | 16 | 0 | 83 | 18 |
