= Martin Lo (football) =

Vietnamese footballer

Martin Lo Lò Martin
Personal information
- Full name: Martin Lo
- Date of birth: 3 September 1997 (age 29)
- Place of birth: Sydney, New South Wales, Australia
- Height: 1.66 m (5 ft 5 in)
- Position: Midfielder

Youth career
- FNSW NTC
- Western Sydney Wanderers

Senior career*
Years	Team	Apps	(Gls)
2016–2017	Bonnyrigg White Eagles	28	(2)
2018–2019	Marconi Stallions	2	(0)
2019	Pho Hien	11	(4)
2020–2024	Haiphong	60	(0)
2024–2025	PVF-CAND	8	(1)

International career^{‡}
2020	Vietnam U23	2	(0)
- * Club domestic league appearances and goals as of 20 April 2025 ‡ National team caps and goals as of 7 September 2020

Martin Lo (Vietnamese: Lò Martin; born 3 September 1997) is a former professional footballer. Born in Australia, he has represented Vietnam at youth level.

== Personal life ==
Born in Sydney, Australia, Lo's parents are Vietnamese immigrants.

== Club career ==
Lo began his career in Australia, before moving to Vietnam in 2019, joining V.League 2 side Pho Hien. He announced his retirement in August 2025.

== International career ==
Born in Australia, he was called up to represent Vietnam at youth level. He made his debut in an unofficial match against Hong Kong club Kitchee SC. He also took part in a training camp prior to the 2021 SEA Games however was ultimately not selected in the final squad.

== Career statistics ==
As of match played 30 June 2024

Appearances and goals by club, season and competition
Club	Season	League			National Cup		Continental		Other		Total	
Club	Season	Division	Apps	Goals	Apps	Goals	Apps	Goals	Apps	Goals	Apps	Goals
Pho Hien	2019	V.League 2	11	4	0	0	—		0	0	11	4
Haiphong FC	2020	V.League 1	9	0	1	0	—		—		10	0
Haiphong FC	2021	V.League 1	9	0	0	0	—		—		9	0
Haiphong FC	2022	V.League 1	14	0	2	0	—		—		16	0
Haiphong FC	2023	V.League 1	10	0	0	0	—		0	0	10	0
Haiphong FC	2023–24	V.League 1	18	0	2	0	7 (Note: One appearance and one goal in AFC Champions League, six appearances and one goal in AFC Cup)	2	0	0	27	2
Haiphong FC	Total		60	0	5	0	7	2	0	0	72	2
Total career			71	4	5	0	7	2	0	0	83	6

== Honours ==
Pho Hien

- V.League 2 runner-up: 2019

Haiphong

- V.League 1 runner-up: 2022
- Vietnamese Super Cup runner-up: 2022
