= Nguyễn Thành Vinh =

Vietnamese football manager

Nguyễn Thành Vinh (born 1946) is a Vietnamese former footballer and manager.

== Career ==
He was born in Vinh, Nghệ An and started playing football at an early age for the football club of Nghệ An. However, due to the effects of Vietnam war, the club was disbanded in the 1970s, forcing Thành Vinh to suspend his football career.

He managed Vietnamese side Sông Lam Nghệ An from 1980 to 2004 and was the most successful in the team's history by winning 6 titles winning, including 2 V.League 1 titles .
