= Nguyễn Thành Công =

Vietnamese football manager

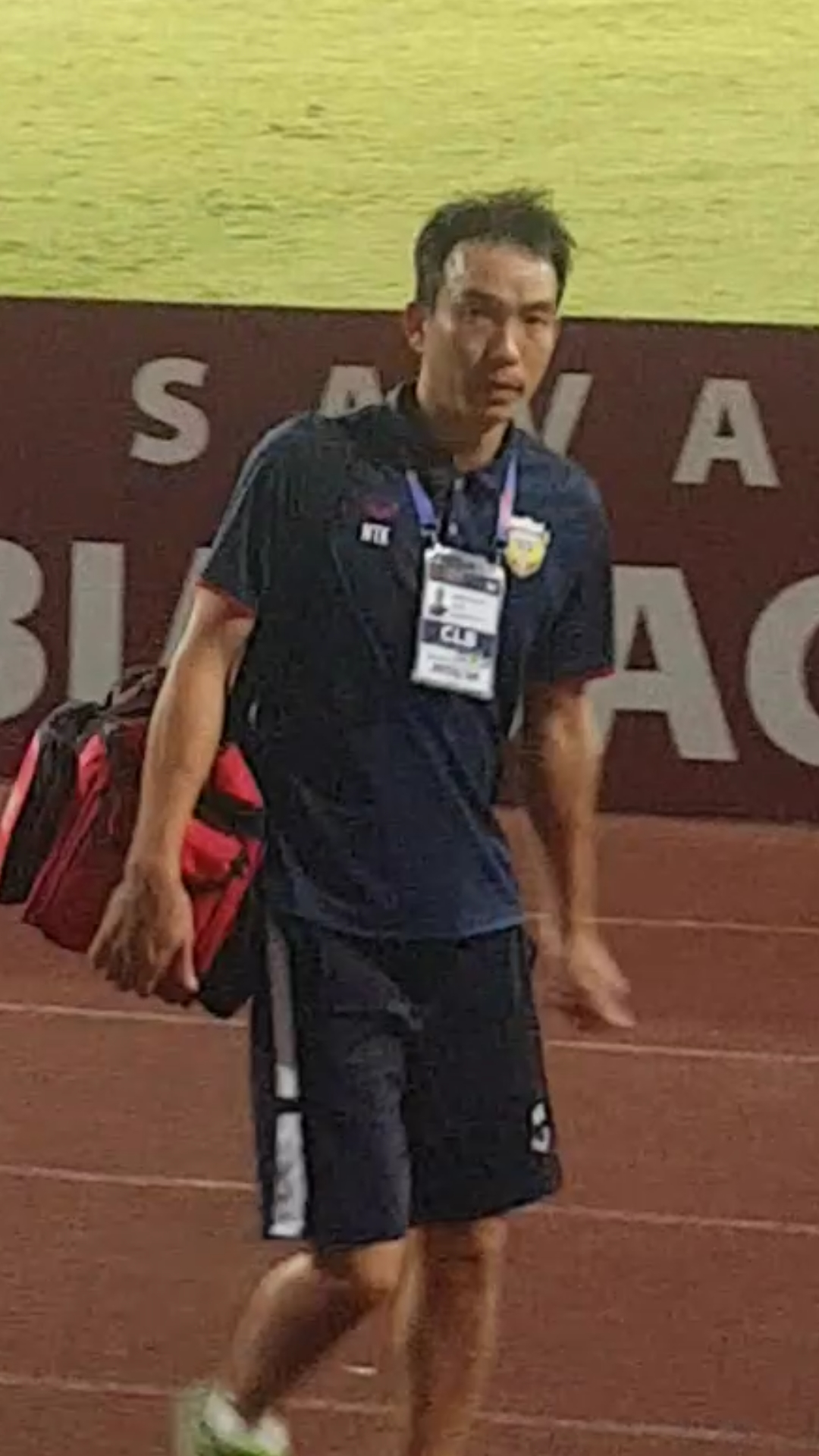
- Thành Công in 2024

Personal information
- Full name: Nguyễn Thành Công
- Date of birth: 7 May 1977 (age 49)
- Place of birth: Nghệ An, Vietnam

Team information
- Current team: Hồng Lĩnh Hà Tĩnh (head coach)

Senior career*
| Years | Team | Apps | (Gls) |
- Sông Lam Nghệ An

Managerial career
- 2018–2019: Sài Gòn
- 2020: Thanh Hóa
- 2020–2021: Quảng Nam
- 2021–: Hồng Lĩnh Hà Tĩnh
- * Club domestic league appearances and goals as of 30 March 2024

Nguyễn Thành Công (born 7 May 1977) is a Vietnamese football manager and former footballer who is currently the head coach of V.League 1 side Hồng Lĩnh Hà Tĩnh.

== Career ==
He started his senior playing career at the age of eighteen. He mainly operated as a striker.

After his retirement, he became a manager and coached several V.League 1 teams.

== Personal life ==
His father Nguyễn Thành Vinh was also a football coach.
