= Bruno Henrique (footballer, born 1992) =

Brazilian association football player

Personal information
- Full name: Bruno Henrique de Sousa
- Date of birth: 25 October 1992 (age 34)
- Place of birth: Goiânia, Brazil
- Height: 1.86 m (6 ft 1 in)
- Position: Forward

Team information
- Current team: Phrae United
- Number: 9

Youth career
- 2009–2012: Goiás

Senior career*
Years	Team	Apps	(Gls)
2012–2013	Goiás	0	(0)
2012	→ Aparecidense (loan)	3	(0)
2013	Navy		
2014	Rio Branco	4	(0)
2015	Sertãozinho	10	(2)
2015	Valeriodoce		
2015–2016	Uberaba		
2016	Leixões	11	(0)
2017	Uberaba	18	(6)
2017	Novo Hamburgo	6	(0)
2017–2018	Bălți	7	(2)
2018	Portal	10	(0)
2018	Altos	3	(0)
2018–2019	Beira-Mar	23	(9)
2019	Moto Club	6	(2)
2020	Hồng Lĩnh Hà Tĩnh	20	(10)
2021	Sông Lam Nghệ An	10	(1)
2022	Goiatuba	6	(0)
2022–2024	Hoàng Anh Gia Lai	9	(2)
2024	AA Francana	20	(6)
2024–	Phrae United	0	(0)
- * Club domestic league appearances and goals as of 25 July 2024 (UTC)

Bruno Henrique de Sousa (born 25 October 1992), known as just Bruno Henrique, is a Brazilian professional footballer who plays as a forward for Phrae United in Thai League 2.

== Career ==
Henrique began his career Goiás but made his professional debut for Rio Branco in the Campeonato Paranaense in March 2014 in a 0–0 draw with Coritiba. He later spent time playing in Thailand, Portugal and Moldova before joining V.League 1 side Hong Linh Ha Tinh for the 2020 season.

In the 2020 season, Henrique made 21 appearances and scored 11 goals in all competitions for Hong Linh Ha Tinh.

On 28 December 2020, fellow V.League 1 club Song Lam Nghe An announced the signing of Henrique on a one-year contract with an extension option. On 30 January 2021, he made his competitive debut for the club against Saigon FC, which SLNA lost 1–0. Before the 2021 season was cancelled due to the impact of the COVID-19 pandemic, he made 10 appearances and scored 1 goal for Song Lam Nghe An.
