= Matheus Vieira =

Brazilian footballer

Personal information
- Full name: Matheus Vieira dos Santos
- Date of birth: 17 May 2001 (age 25)
- Place of birth: Santos, Brazil
- Height: 1.89 m (6 ft 2 in)
- Position: Centre-back

Team information
- Current team: Angelana

Youth career
- 2014–2016: Jabaquara
- 2016–2017: Portuguesa Santista
- 2018–2020: São Paulo
- 2021–2022: Cruzeiro

Senior career*
Years	Team	Apps	(Gls)
2021–2022	Cruzeiro	0	(0)
2022	Moto Club	3	(1)
2023	São Caetano	0	(0)
2024	Sangiustese		
2024–2025	Ellera Calcio		
2025–	Angelana		
- * Club domestic league appearances and goals as of 25 May 2026

Matheus Vieira dos Santos (born 17 May 2001), mostly known as Matheus Vieira, is a Brazilian professional footballer who plays as a centre-back.

== Career ==
Born in Santos, Vieira began his career at Jabaquara, also having spells in the youth ranks of Portuguesa Santista, São Paulo FC, and Cruzeiro. In 2021, he was promoted to Cruzeiro EC main team by then-coach Vanderlei Luxemburgo, but did not play. He made his professional debut for Moto Club in the state championship.

In 2023 he was signed with AD São Caetano, but suffered an ACL injury during pre-season. The player received no assistance and ended up having to undergo surgery and recovery in the Brazilian public health system. In 2024 he restarted his career at AC Sangiustese, in Serie D in Italy. After a spell at Ellera Calcio, in May 2026 Vieira gained the attention of the Brazilian sports media as an example of overcoming adversity, when he became champion in the Eccellenza of Umbria with Angelana 1930.

== Honours ==
Angelana

- Eccellenza: 2025–26
