= Grace Tanda =

Congolese footballer

Personal information
- Full name: Bapianga Deogracias Tanda
- Date of birth: 29 January 1994 (age 32)
- Place of birth: Likasi, Zaïre
- Height: 1.88 m (6 ft 2 in)
- Position: Striker

Senior career*
Years	Team	Apps	(Gls)
2014	IFK Östersund	6	(0)
2015	Östersunds FK	6	(2)
2016	Skellefteå FF	26	(11)
2017	Motala AIF	24	(10)
2018	BK Forward	30	(12)
2019	Gefle IF	27	(8)
2020	Thanh Hóa	2	(0)
2020	SHB Đà Nẵng	15	(6)
2021	IFK Luleå	2	(0)
2021	Levski Lom	7	(0)
2022–2023	Al-Suqoor		

International career
2015	DR Congo U20	2	(0)
- * Club domestic league appearances and goals

Bapianga Deogracias "Grace" Tanda (born 29 January 1994) is a Congolese professional footballer who plays as a striker.

== Club career ==
=== Early career ===
Tanda began his club career with Ope IF, in 2011 Tanda transferred to Östersunds FK B team, for which he played in Division 4.In Östersunds FK Second team Tanda scored 12 goals in two seasons. Before the 2014 season, he got sign by the division 2 team IFK Östersund. After only half a season in IFK Östersund with many good performance in the division 2. He was recruited by Östersunds FK in the summer of 2014 to compete in Superettan. Graham Potter and Billy Reid saw that there was a lot of potential in Tanda and wanted him to sign with Östersunds FK.

=== Östersunds FK ===
He made his debut in the Superettan on 25 October 2014, in a 2–1 home loss against Assyriska FF, where Tanda was replaced by Luka Peric in the 87th minute. On 2 November 2014, Tanda played his first match from the start and scored his first Superettan goal in a 2-2 match against Ängelholms FF.

=== Skellefteå FF ===
In 2016 Tanda was loaned out full season to the division 2 team Skellefteå FF after coming back from a ligament injury. he played 26 games and score 11 and assisted 14. With his eleven goals in division II, Grace Tanda Skellefteå was FF's sharpest goal scorer in 2016.

=== Motala AIF FF ===
In 2017, Tanda signed one-year contract with Division II team Motala AIF FF and he scored 10 goals in 24 league games.

=== BK Forward ===
On 2018 the former Östersunds FK player got recruited by the division 1 team BK Forward. Tanda played 30 games for the Örebro team and scored 14 goal. He was rumoured to sign with the Superettan team Landskrona Bois summer 2018 after his performance with BK Forward but remained at the club to the end of the season.

=== Gefle IF ===
On 11 January 2019 Tanda signed for the ancient club Gefle IF he scored 8 goals in 26 games. after the season

=== Thanh Hoa Fc ===
Tanda left Gefle if and signed for the V.league 1 team Thanh Hoa Fc in Vietnam. After two games, both parties agreed to end the contract.

=== CLB SHB Da Nang ===
In March 2020, he signed for another V.league1 team, CLB SHB Da Nang.

== International career ==
In summer 2015 made his debut for DR Congo U20 U23 against France U-20 in a friendly match in Centre Technique de la Ligue du Midi-Pyrénées de Castelmourou. a France team in full preparation for the Euro. Congo lost by 2–0. Tanda started the match.
