= Pedro Paulo =

Pedro Paulo is a Portuguese given name, the equivalent of "Peter Paul" in English.

The name is worn by:

- Pedro Paulo (footballer, born 1945), Brazilian football right back
- Pedro Paulo (footballer, born 1973) (1973–2000), Angolan football midfielder
- Pedro Paulo (footballer, born 1985) (born 1985), Brazilian football striker
- Pedro Paulo (footballer, born 1994), Brazilian footballer
- Pedro Paulo (politician) (born 1972), Brazilian politician
- Pedro Paulo Diniz (born 1970), Brazilian Formula One racing driver
- Pedro Paulo Rangel (born 1948), Brazilian actor featured in Pedra sobre Pedra, Cama de Gato or O Sorriso do Lagarto
- Pedro Paulo (trumpet player) (born 1939), Brazilian trumpet player featured on Ben é Samba Bom or Sacundin Ben Samba
