= Nguyễn Đức Thắng (footballer, born 1977) =

Vietnamese footballer (born 1977)

Personal information
- Date of birth: 1977 (age 48–49)
- Place of birth: Nghệ An, Vietnam
- Height: 1.82 m (6 ft 0 in)
- Position: Goalkeeper

Senior career*
Years	Team	Apps	(Gls)
1995–2003	Sông Lam Nghệ An		
2004–2008	Hà Nội		
2009–2011	Sông Lam Nghệ An		

Managerial career
- 2016–2019: Sông Lam Nghệ An
- * Club domestic league appearances and goals

Nguyễn Đức Thắng (born 1977) is a Vietnamese football manager and footballer.

== Career ==
He spent most of his career playing for his hometown club Sông Lam Nghệ An.

After his retirement, he served as the assistant manager of from 2012 to 2016, before being appointed as the head coach. He helped the club win the 2017 Vietnamese Cup.

== Style of play ==
As a goalkeeper, he was described as "professional mark is his strange low-range ball-catching style, quite similar to the first pass-catching style in volleyball".

== Honours ==
=== As manager ===
- Vietnamese Cup: 2017
