= Đinh Xuân Việt =

Vietnamese footballer (born 1983)

Personal information
- Full name: Đinh Xuân Việt
- Date of birth: 10 November 1983 (age 43)
- Place of birth: Hải Phòng, Vietnam
- Height: 1.86 m (6 ft 1 in)
- Position: Goalkeeper

Youth career
- 2005–2009: Hải Phòng

Senior career*
Years	Team	Apps	(Gls)
2010–2016	Hải Phòng	61	(0)
2016–2018	Hồ Chí Minh City	14	(0)
2018–2022	Nam Định	65	(0)
- * Club domestic league appearances and goals as of 5 May 2019

Đinh Xuân Việt (born 10 November 1983) is a Vietnamese former footballer who last played as a goalkeeper for Nam Định.
