= Luizão (footballer, born 1990) =

Brazilian footballer

Personal information
- Full name: Walter Luiz de Araújo
- Date of birth: 23 June 1990 (age 36)
- Place of birth: Firminópolis, Brazil
- Height: 1.92 m (6 ft 4 in)
- Position: Central defender

Senior career*
Years	Team	Apps	(Gls)
2012	CRAC	1	(0)
2013	Grêmio Anápolis	12	(0)
2014	Ituano	10	(1)
2015–2019	Londrina	64	(3)
2017	→ Coritiba (loan)	6	(0)
2019	São Bento	8	(0)
2020–2021	Viettel	11	(0)
- * Club domestic league appearances and goals as of 17 January 2021

Walter Luiz de Araújo (born 23 June 1990), simply known as Luizão, is a Brazilian professional footballer who last played for Viettel in the V.League 1.
