= Nguyễn Hùng Anh =

Russian footballer

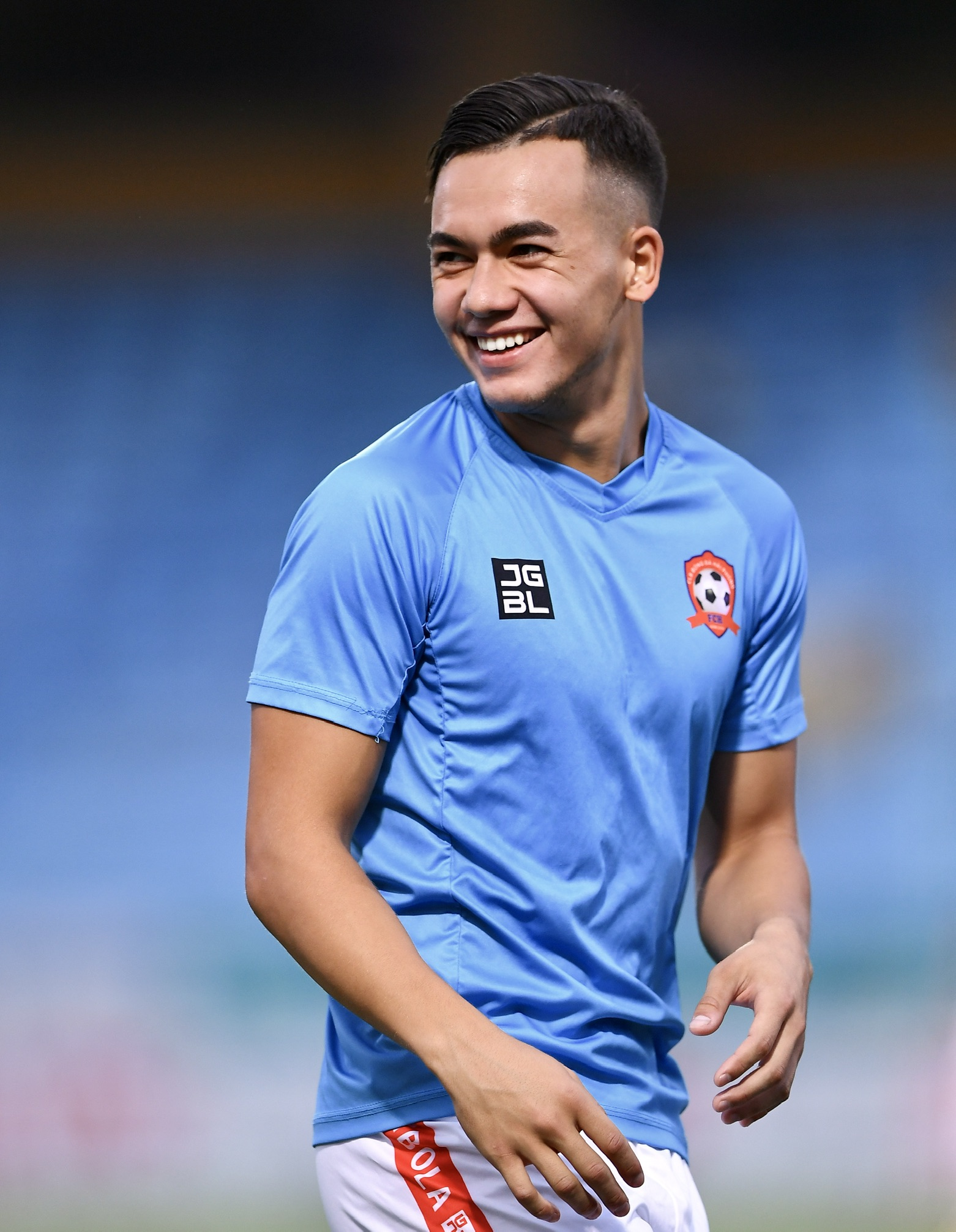

Personal information
- Full name: Andrey Hungovich Nguyen
- Date of birth: 10 December 1998 (age 27)
- Place of birth: Moscow, Russia
- Height: 1.74 m (5 ft 9 in)
- Position: Midfielder

Team information
- Current team: Hải Phòng
- Number: 37

Senior career*
| Years | Team | Apps | (Gls) |
| 2019–2021 | Hải Phòng | 3 | (0) |
- * Club domestic league appearances and goals as of 19:03, 29 August 2023 (UTC)

Andrey Hungovich Nguyen (born 10 December 1998) is a Russian professional footballer who plays as a midfielder for Hải Phòng.

== Career ==
In 2019, Nguyễn signed for Vietnamese side Hải Phòng.
