= Andre Fagan =

Jamaican footballer (born 1987)

Personal information
- Full name: Andre Diego Fagan
- Date of birth: 16 July 1987 (age 39)
- Place of birth: Kingston, Jamaica
- Height: 1.80 m (5 ft 11 in)
- Position: Forward

Team information
- Current team: Harbour View
- Number: 9

Youth career
- Meadhaven United F.C.
- Harbour View F.C.

Senior career*
Years	Team	Apps	(Gls)
2008–2011	Harbour View	12	(3)
2011	Sông Lam Nghệ An	26	(10)
2012–2013	Hải Phòng	25	(8)
2013–2014	Harbour View	14	(6)
2014–2021	Hải Phòng	142	(35)
2020	→ Than Quảng Ninh (loan)	11	(5)
2022	Nam Định	4	(0)
2023–	Harbour View	25	(4)
- * Club domestic league appearances and goals as of 7 April 2024

Andre Diego Fagan (born 16 July 1987) is a Jamaican footballer who plays as a forward for the Jamaica Premier League club Harbour View.

Fagan spent most of his career playing in Vietnam. He used to play for Song Lam Nghe An, Hai Phong, Than Quang Ninh and Nam Dinh clubs.
