= Hoàng Văn Khánh =

Vietnamese footballer (born 1995)

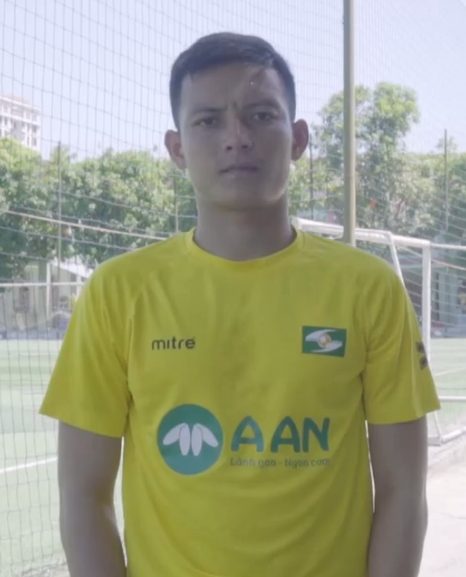
- Văn Khánh in 2021

Personal information
- Full name: Hoàng Văn Khánh
- Date of birth: April 5, 1995 (age 31)
- Place of birth: Tân Kỳ, Nghệ An, Vietnam
- Height: 1.80 m (5 ft 11 in)
- Position: Centre-back

Team information
- Current team: Sông Lam Nghệ An
- Number: 55

Youth career
- 2007–2014: Sông Lam Nghệ An

Senior career*
Years	Team	Apps	(Gls)
2015–2022	Sông Lam Nghệ An	130	(2)
2015–2016	→ XSKT Cần Thơ (loan)	10	(0)
2023–2024	Thép Xanh Nam Định	32	(0)
2025–	Sông Lam Nghệ An	30	(0)

International career
2013–2014	Vietnam U19	10	(1)
2017–2018	Vietnam U23	5	(1)
2017–2018	Vietnam	2	(0)
- * Club domestic league appearances and goals as of 7 June 2026

Hoàng Văn Khánh (born 5 April 1995) is a Vietnamese professional footballer who plays as a centre-back for V.League 1 club Sông Lam Nghệ An.

== International goals ==
=== Vietnam U23 ===
No.	Date	Venue	Opponent	Score	Result	Competition
1.	21 July 2017	Thong Nhat Stadium, Ho Chi Minh City, Vietnam	Macau	6–0	8–1	2018 AFC U-23 Championship qualification

== Honours ==
Sông Lam Nghệ An

- Vietnamese Cup: 2017

Thép Xanh Nam Định

- V.League 1: 2023–24
- Vietnamese Super Cup: 2024
