= Janclesio =

Brazilian footballer

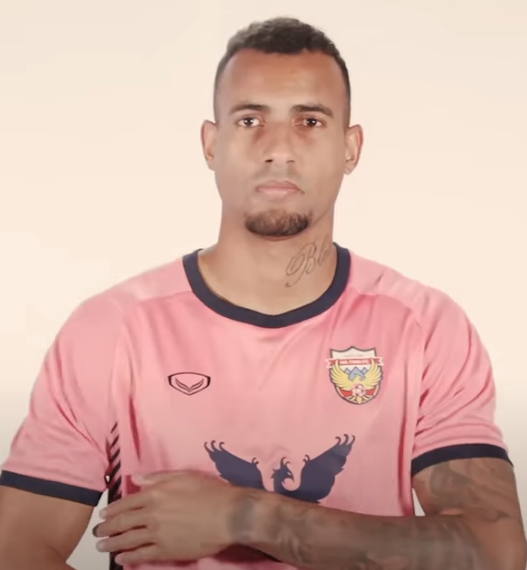
- Janclesio in 2022

Personal information
- Full name: Janclésio Almeida Santos
- Date of birth: 22 April 1993 (age 33)
- Place of birth: Itanhém, Brazil
- Height: 1.96 m (6 ft 5 in)
- Position: Center-back

Team information
- Current team: Ninh Binh
- Number: 4

Youth career
- –2011: Mogi Mirim
- 2011: Sertãozinho

Senior career*
Years	Team	Apps	(Gls)
2013	Radium	6	(0)
2014–2015	Francana	7	(0)
2016	EC São Bernardo	9	(0)
2017	Jacobina	3	(0)
2018	Real Noroeste	12	(2)
2019	Campinense	8	(0)
2019	Viettel	12	(0)
2020	Hong Linh Ha Tinh	20	(0)
2020–2021	SHB Da Nang	12	(0)
2021	Becamex Ho Chi Minh City	0	(0)
2022–2023	Hong Linh Ha Tinh	39	(9)
2023–2025	Becamex Ho Chi Minh City	44	(4)
2025–	Ninh Binh	0	(0)
- * Club domestic league appearances and goals as of 28 February 2026

Janclésio Almeida Santos (born 22 April 1993), simply known as Janclesio, is a Brazilian professional footballer who plays as a center-back for V.League 1 club Ninh Binh.

== Club career ==
In the half of the 2019 V.League 1 season, Janclesio joined the newly promoted V.League 1 side Viettel and appeared in 11 games.

In 2020, Janclesio joined Hồng Lĩnh Hà Tĩnh. He was named team captain shortly after his signature and played an important role to help his team finish in top 8 of the league table in their first ever season in V.League 1.

In 2021, Janclesio played for SHB Đà Nẵng. He appeared in every possible league game before the season was cancelled due to the effects of COVID-19 in Vietnam.

On 21 December 2021, Janclesio made his comeback to Hồng Lĩnh Hà Tĩnh. In the last round of the 2022 V.League 1 season, he scored the winning goal for his team's 2–1 victory against Thanh Hóa, thus helped his team avoid relegation as they are 1 point above the relegation zone. He scored a total of 7 goals during the season, a record for a defender in V.League 1's history.

In August 2023, Becamex Bình Dương announced the signing of Janclesio to the team. He made his debut as a starter 29 October 2023, as Becamex Binh Duong defeated Binh Dinh 2–0.
