= Adriano Schmidt =

Vietnamese footballer

Personal information
- Full name: Bùi Đức Duy
- Birth name: Adriano Schmidt
- Date of birth: 9 May 1994 (age 32)
- Place of birth: Grimma, Germany
- Height: 1.85 m (6 ft 1 in)
- Position: Centre-back

Team information
- Current team: Becamex Hồ Chí Minh City
- Number: 5

Youth career
- FC Augsburg
- 2012–2013: FC Ingolstadt 04

Senior career*
Years	Team	Apps	(Gls)
2013–2014	VfB Eichstätt	12	(0)
2014–2015	FC Gerolfing	18	(0)
2015–2018	TSV Schwabmünchen	84	(1)
2018–2021	Hải Phòng	48	(3)
2021–2024	Quy Nhơn Bình Định	59	(0)
2024–2025	Hồ Chí Minh City	20	(0)
2025–	Becamex Hồ Chí Minh City	3	(0)

International career^{‡}
2022	Vietnam	1	(0)
- * Club domestic league appearances and goals as of 27 September 2025 ‡ National team caps and goals as of 1 June 2022

Adriano Schmidt (born 9 May 1994), also known as Bùi Đức Duy, is a professional footballer who plays as a centre-back for V.League 1 club Becamex Hồ Chí Minh City. Born in Germany, he represented Vietnam at international level.

== Early life ==
Adriano Schmidt was born in 1994 with a Vietnamese father and a German mother. He was raised in Augsburg, Germany.

== International career ==
In March 2022, Adriano Schmidt was called up to the Vietnam national team to the World Cup 2022 third qualification round. He made his debut for the Vietnam national team on 1 June 2022 in a friendly match against Afghanistan and made an assist to Phạm Tuấn Hải.

== Career statistics ==
=== Club ===
As of 4 April 2024

Club	Season	League			Cup		Other		Total	
Club	Season	Division	Apps	Goals	Apps	Goals	Apps	Goals	Apps	Goals
Haiphong	2018	V.League 1	9	0	0	0	—		9	0
Haiphong	2019	V.League 1	16	1	1	0	—		17	1
Haiphong	2020	V.League 1	15	1	0	0	—		15	1
Haiphong	2021	V.League 1	8	1	1	0	—		9	1
Haiphong	Total		48	3	2	0	0	0	50	3
Quy Nhon Binh Dinh	2022	V.League 1	19	0	4	1	—		23	1
Quy Nhon Binh Dinh	2023	V.League 1	18	0	0	0	0	0	18	0
Quy Nhon Binh Dinh	2024	V.League 1	13	0	0	0	0	0	13	0
Quy Nhon Binh Dinh	Total		50	0	4	1	0	0	54	1
Career total			98	3	6	1	0	0	104	4

=== International ===
As of 1 June 2022

National team	Year	Apps	Goals
Vietnam
Vietnam	2022	1	0
Total		1	0

== Honours ==
Topenland Binh Dinh

- V.League 1 third place: 2022
- Vietnamese Cup runner-up: 2022

== See also ==
- List of Vietnam footballers born outside Vietnam
