= Phạm Anh Tuấn =

Vietnamese footballer (born 1970)

Personal information
- Full name: Phạm Anh Tuấn
- Date of birth: 1970 (age 55–56)
- Place of birth: Vinh, Nghệ An, North Vietnam
- Position: Right back

Youth career
- –1990: Sông Lam Nghệ An

Senior career*
Years	Team	Apps	(Gls)
1990–2006	Sông Lam Nghệ An		

Managerial career
- 2007: Sông Lam Nghệ An (assistant)
- 2007–2008: Ninh Bình
- 2009–2019: Sông Lam Nghệ An (assistant)
- 2020–2021: Hải Phòng
- 2024–: Sông Lam Nghệ An
- * Club domestic league appearances and goals

Phạm Anh Tuấn (born 1970) is a Vietnamese former football footballer who played as a right back. He is currently the head coach of Sông Lam Nghệ An

== Career ==
Anh Tuấn grew up in an impoverished family in Nghệ An and was unable to afford football shoes. He managed so join the Sông Lam Nghệ An youth academy. In 1990, he was promoted to the first team. He the spent his entire career playing for Sông Lam Nghệ An, helping the club win the league in 2000 and 2001.

After his retirement, he remained with Sông Lam Nghệ An, working as the assistant manager in 2007, then from 2009 to 2019. In May 2024, he was appointed as the head coach of the club.

== Style of play ==
Anh Tuấn mainly operated as a right back, but he possessed good attacking ability. He was described as "good technique, agility and strength, but possesses quite poor aerial ability and finishing ability".

== Honours ==
Sông Lam Nghệ An

- V.League 1: 1999–2000, 2000–2001
- Vietnamese Cup: 2001–02
- Vietnamese Super Cup: 2000, 2001, 2002
