= Caíque (footballer, born 1993) =

Brazilian footballer

Personal information
- Full name: Caíque Venâncio Lemes
- Date of birth: 12 July 1993 (age 33)
- Place of birth: Varginha, Brazil
- Height: 1.85 m (6 ft 1 in)
- Position: Forward

Team information
- Current team: Ayutthaya United
- Number: 77

Senior career*
Years	Team	Apps	(Gls)
2012–2013	Londrina	1	(0)
2014	CA Juventus	3	(0)
2015–2016	Friburguense	21	(3)
2015	→ Macaé (loan)	0	(0)
2016	Penapolense	0	(0)
2017	Taubaté	18	(8)
2017–2018	Guarani	51	(7)
2018–2019	Desportivo das Aves	1	(0)
2020	→ Chiangmai (loan)	11	(4)
2020–2022	Viettel	33	(8)
2023	Maringá	6	(1)
2024	Patrocinense	5	(0)
2024	Mixto	16	(6)
2024–	Ayutthaya United	31	(21)
- * Club domestic league appearances and goals as of 26 April 2025

Caíque Venâncio Lemes (born July 12, 1993), simply known as Caíque, is a Brazilian footballer who plays as a forward for a Thai League 2 club Ayutthaya United.

== Honours ==
=== Club ===
Guarani

- Campeonato Paulista Série A2: 2018
