= Phan Thanh Hùng =

Vietnamese football player and manager (1960-2026)

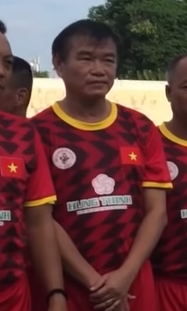
- Hùng in 2019

Personal information
- Date of birth: 30 July 1960
- Place of birth: Đà Nẵng, South Vietnam
- Date of death: 11 August 2026 (aged 66)
- Height: 1.73 m (5 ft 8 in)
- Position: Forward

Youth career
- 1976–1979: Quảng Nam Đà Nẵng

Senior career*
Years	Team	Apps	(Gls)
1980–1992	Quảng Nam Đà Nẵng	296	(35)

International career
1993	Vietnam	7	(1)

Managerial career
- 2007–2008: SHB Đà Nẵng
- 2008–2009: SHB Đà Nẵng U21
- 2008–2011: Vietnam (assistant manager)
- 2010–2016: Hà Nội T&T
- 2010–2012: Vietnam U23
- 2012: Vietnam
- 2016–2020: Than Quảng Ninh
- 2021: Becamex Bình Dương
- 2021–2023: SHB Danang
- 2025: SHB Danang
- * Club domestic league appearances and goals

Phan Thanh Hùng (30 July 1960 – 11 August 2026) was a Vietnamese football player and manager who played as a striker.

Hùng was also the head coach of Vietnam in 2012. He died of laryngeal cancer on 11 August 2026, at the age of 66.

== Career statistics ==
Appearances and goals by national team and year
National team	Year	Apps	Goals
Vietnam	1993	5	1
Total		5	0

Scores and results list Vietnam's goal tally first, score column indicates score after each Hùng goal.

List of international goals scored by Phan Thanh Hùng
No.	Date	Venue	Opponent	Score	Result	Competition
1	13 April 1993	Doha, Qatar	Singapore	2–3	2–3	1994 FIFA World Cup qualification
