= Jogarbola =

Japanese sports equipment manufacturing company

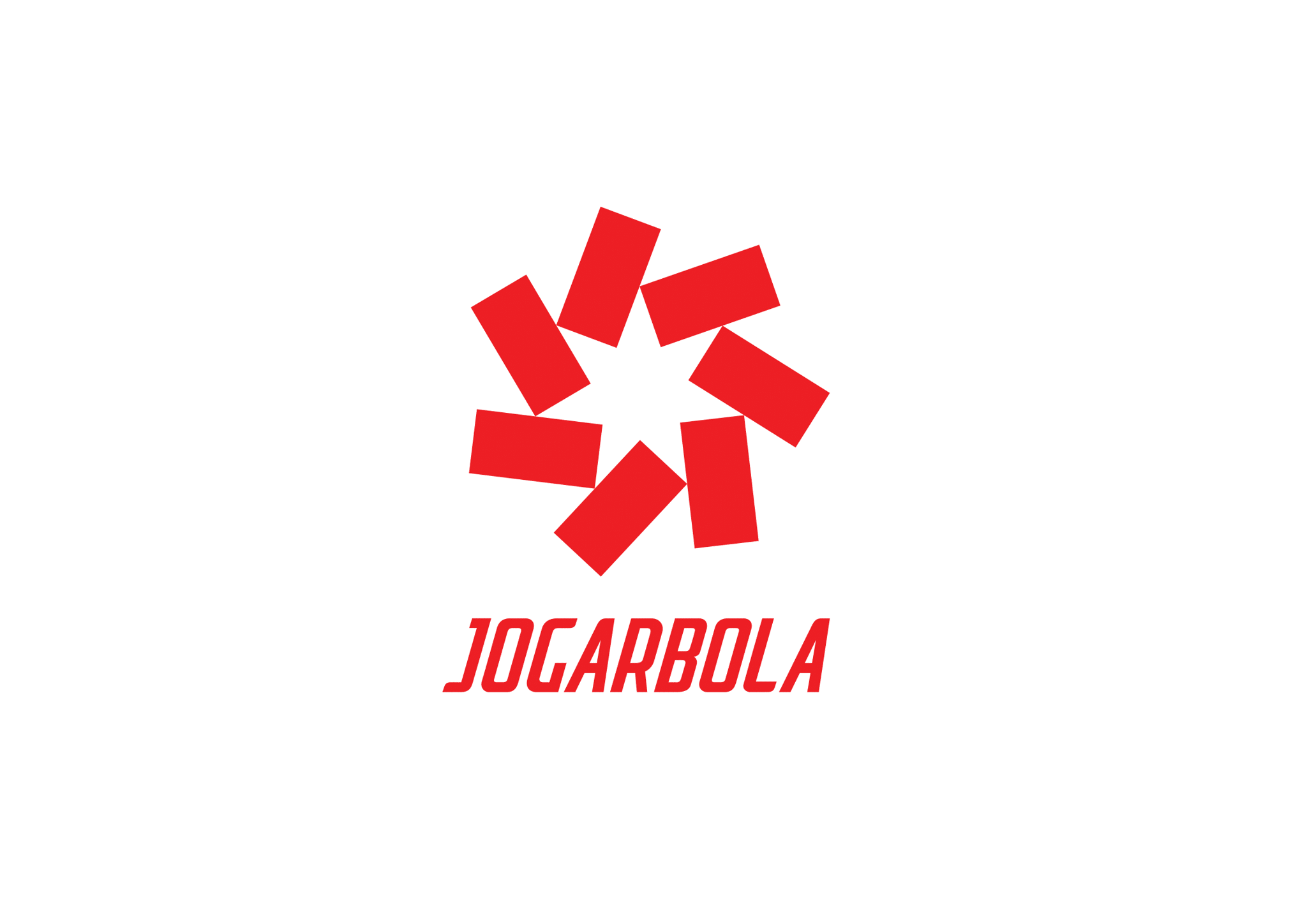
- Type: Limited
- Industry: Sportswear; Sports Equipment
- Founded: 2016; 10 years ago
- Headquarters: Nakacho, Urawa-ku, Saitama, Japan
- Area served: Worldwide
- Products: Athletic shoes Apparel; Sports equipment
- Website: www.jogarbola.com

Jogarbola (JGBL; Japanese: ジョガボーラ) is a sports equipment manufacturing company based in Japan and established in 2016. The brand is operated by Soccer.com Inc and had sponsored several professional sport teams, mainly in its homeland Japan and also Vietnam.

== Sponsorships ==
Sponsorships for Vietnamese and Southeast Asian teams are virtually represented by the local enterprise Động Lực Sport, the Vietnamese exclusive distributor and producer of the brand in the region.

=== Olympic Committee ===
- Vietnam (2024)

=== Football ===
==== Asian Football Confederation (AFC) ====
- Vietnam (2024–2026)
- Myanmar (2025–2029)
- Laos (2025–2029)

==== Club teams ====
- (Japan) Ehime FC
- (Japan) Tokyo 23 FC
- (Japan) FC Tiamo Hirakata
- (Thailand) Toko Customs United
- (Vietnam) Hà Nội (2021–2026)
- (Vietnam) Công An Hà Nội (2018, 2022, 2025–2026)
- (Vietnam) Thanh Hóa FC (2019–2025; 2026–present)
- (Vietnam) Hồ Chí Minh City Police (2023–present)
- (Vietnam) Hải Phòng (2019–2024; 2026–present)
- (Vietnam) Quảng Nam (2019–2020)
- (Vietnam) PVF-CAND FC (2024–present)
- (Vietnam) Thép Xanh Nam Định (2025–present)
- (Vietnam) Trường Tươi Đồng Nai (2025–present)
- (Vietnam) Thái Nguyên T&T (2026–present)

=== Leagues ===
Jogarbola is the official supplier for the following leagues:

- (Vietnam) V.League 1
- (Vietnam) V.League 2
- (Vietnam) National Cup

=== Volleyball ===
==== National team ====
- Vietnam women
- Vietnam men
