= Zé Paulo (footballer, born 1994) =

Brazilian footballer

Personal information
- Full name: José Paulo de Oliveira Pinto
- Date of birth: 26 March 1994 (age 32)
- Place of birth: Raposo, Rio de Janeiro, Brazil
- Height: 1.89 m (6 ft 2 in)
- Position: Attacking midfielder

Youth career
- –2014: Corinthians

Senior career*
Years	Team	Apps	(Gls)
2014–2017	Corinthians	5	(0)
2014–2015	→ Athletico Paranaense (loan)	3	(0)
2015	→ Red Bull Bragantino (loan)	2	(0)
2015–2016	→ Rio Ave (loan)	3	(0)
2016–2017	→ Académico de Viseu (loan)	30	(9)
2017–2018	Académico de Viseu	33	(4)
2018	Académica de Coimbra	5	(0)
2019	Leixões	21	(5)
2020	Quang Nam	17	(3)
2021–2022	Dong A Thanh Hoa	33	(11)
2023	Hong Linh Ha Tinh	18	(2)
2023–2024	PSM Makassar	9	(0)
2024–2025	Haiphong	11	(0)
2025	Quy Nhon Binh Dinh	7	(1)
- * Club domestic league appearances and goals as of 22 June 2025

José Paulo de Oliveira Pinto (born 26 March 1994), commonly known as Zé Paulo, is a Brazilian professional footballer who last played as an attacking midfielder for Quy Nhon Binh Dinh.

== Club career ==
He made his professional debut in the Campeonato Paulista for Corinthians on 6 February 2014 in a game against Red Bull Bragantino.

On 15 December 2018, Zé Paulo signed with Leixões until 2020.
