= Song Lam Nghe An FC =

Vietnamese football club

Sông Lam Nghệ An
- Full name: Sông Lam Nghệ An Football Club
- Nicknames: Đội bóng xứ Nghệ; Đội bóng áo vàng (The Yellows); Đội bóng thành Vinh; Đội bóng quê Bác; Đội bóng sông Lam
- Short name: SLNA
- Founded: 28 February 1979; 47 years ago as Sông Lam Nghệ Tĩnh
- Ground: Vinh Stadium
- Capacity: 20,000
- Owner: Song Lam Nghe An Sports JSC
- Chairman: Trần Quang Thưởng
- Manager: Văn Sỹ Sơn
- League: V.League 1
- 2026–27: TBA
- Website: www.slnafc.com
Home colours	Away colours	Third colours

Song Lam Nghe An Football Club (Vietnamese: Câu lạc bộ Bóng đá Sông Lam Nghệ An), simply known as SLNA, is a professional football club based in Thành Vinh ward, Nghệ An, Vietnam. The club play their home matches at Vinh Stadium and compete in the V.League 1, the top flight of the Vietnamese football league system.

On the domestic level, with 10 major titles at the first team and several titles in Vietnamese youth competitions, Song Lam Nghe An is one of the most successful football clubs in Vietnam. In the 2009–2010 and 2010–2011 seasons, under head coach Nguyễn Hữu Thắng, Song Lam Nghe An achieved all three major domestic titles: the V.League 1, Vietnamese Cup, and the Vietnamese Super Cup. Song Lam Nghe An have a tradition of only using domestic players from the club's youth academy. Most domestic players in the club's history are from Nghệ An province or Hà Tĩnh province, a usual thing among Vietnamese teams. With a quality youth academy, Song Lam Nghe An are one of the clubs that had contributed the most players to the Vietnam national football team. Furthermore, they are the first and only team to have reached 1000 points in the V.League 1.

== History ==
During the French colonial period, the Vinh - Ben Thuy area once had a famous football team called the Yellow Shirt Team. This is considered the beginning of Nghe An football tradition. Some people believe that this is the origin of the traditional yellow shirt of the Song Lam Nghe An team today.

However, the Nghe Tinh region hardly had any outstanding breakthroughs throughout most of the war. It was not until 1973 that the Nghe Tinh Provincial Military Command established an amateur football team to compete in the B Division. This team is considered the predecessor of today's Song Lam Nghe An.

In 1979, after the National Football Championship system was established, with good performance, the team was ranked in the national A2 class. On February 28, 1979, the team was officially transferred by the Nghe Tinh Provincial Military Command to the Nghe Tinh Provincial People's Committee for management and renamed Song Lam Football Team.

In 1980, Coach Nguyen Thanh Vinh took charge of the Song Lam Nghe Tinh Football Team. Since then, with his efforts, despite being a new team in Vietnamese football compared to others such as The Cong, Cang Saigon, Hanoi Police, Haiphong Police, the Song Lam football team has developed a playing style of its own and has had some achievements.

In 1992, Nghe Tinh province was divided into two separate provinces: Nghe An and Ha Tinh. On March 21, 1994, the Nghe An Provincial People's Committee decided to rename the team to Song Lam Football Team and transform it into a professional unit under the Department of Physical Education and Sports. In 1996, the team won the bronze medal in the National Championship and the National Cup.

In 2000, Song Lam Nghe An won the National Championship for the first time. In 2010, the team won the National Cup for the second time. In the 2011 season, the club won its third championship with a 1–1 draw against Hanoi T&T at Vinh Stadium, finishing the V.League with 49 points after 26 rounds. In the 2017 season, despite finishing only 7th in the V.League, Song Lam Nghe An defeated Dak Lak, Hanoi, Ho Chi Minh City, Quang Nam and Becamex Binh Duong to win the 2017 Vietnamese Cup.

The 2020 season was the most difficult period for Song Lam Nghe An in the V.League 1. In early 2022, the club officially announced a new brand identity. The team's old logo was replaced with a new one with a more modern design.

== International cooperation ==
=== Mito HollyHock ===
Song Lam Nghe An signed a cooperation agreement with Japanese club Mito HollyHock on 1 January 2024, on a one-year deal. In this cooperation program, Mito HollyHock will advise and support the construction of a team management and administration system in the direction of improving the professional capacity of departments for Song Lam Nghe An Club and help perfecting the club's organizational structure following the Japanese football club model.

== Name ==
- 1979–1992: Song Lam Nghe Tinh football team
- 1992–2004: Song Lam Nghe An football team
- 2004–2007: PJICO Song Lam Nghe An Football Club
- 2007–2009: Song Lam Nghe An Petroleum Finance Football Club
- 2009–present: Song Lam Nghe An Football Club

== Logo history ==
January 2009 – 1 April 2022

5 January 2022 – present

== Kit manufacturers and shirt sponsors ==
Period	Kit manufacturer	Shirt sponsor
2014	(Italy) Kappa	Bac A Bank; TH True Juice Milk; TH True Water
2015–2016	Made by club	Bac A Bank; TH True Juice Milk; TH True Water
2017–2021	(England) Mitre	Bac A Bank; TH True Juice Milk; TH True Water
2022–2024	(Thailand) Grand Sport	AAN; Eurosun Việt Nam; Nikkokutrust
2024–2026	(Vietnam) Kamito	AAN; Eurosun Việt Nam; Nikkokutrust; Bia sao vàng SIBA Group
2026– present	(Vietnam) Kamito	Bia sao vàng AAN; VNPAY

== Stadium ==
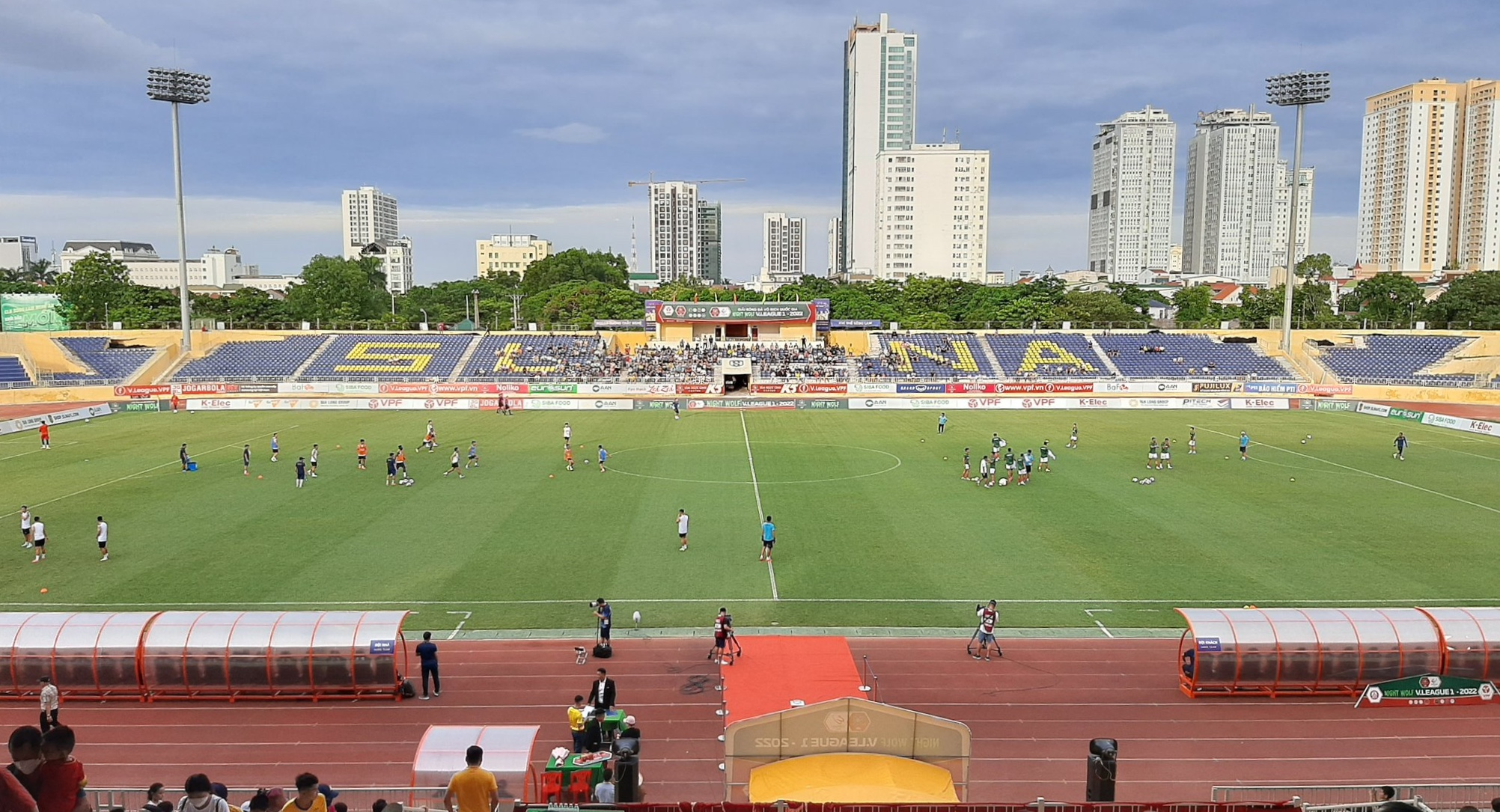
The view from Stand A of Vinh Stadium (photo taken in 2022)

Vinh Stadium with a capacity of 20.000 seats, located on Dao Tan Street, Vinh City, Nghe An Province, has been chosen as the club's home stadium from the early days of its establishment until present.

== Players ==
=== Current squad ===
As of 6 September 2026

Note: Flags indicate national team as defined under FIFA eligibility rules; some limited exceptions apply. Players may hold more than one non-FIFA nationality.

No.	Pos.	Nation	Player
1	GK	VIE	Cao Văn Bình
2	DF	ITA	Roberto Cittadini
3	DF	VIE	Nguyễn Mai Hoàng
5	MF	NGR	Joseph Onoja
6	DF	VIE	Phan Văn Thành
7	DF	VIE	Hồ Văn Cường
8	MF	VIE	Nguyễn Xuân Bình
10	MF	FRA	Phi-Long Tran
12	DF	VIE	Bùi Thanh Đức
15	DF	VIE	Lê Nguyên Hoàng
16	MF	VIE	Nguyễn Quang Vinh
17	MF	VIE	Trần Nam Hải
18	FW	VIE	Lê Đình Long Vũ
19	MF	VIE	Phan Bá Quyền
20	MF	VIE	Lê Văn Quý

No.	Pos.	Nation	Player
21	FW	VIE	Phan Xuân Đại
22	MF	VIE	Ngô Văn Bắc
23	DF	VIE	Hoàng Minh Hợi
24	DF	VIE	Trịnh Hoàng Cảnh
25	GK	VIE	Nguyễn Bảo Ngọc
27	MF	VIE	Đặng Văn Lắm
28	GK	VIE	Trần Văn Đạt
29	MF	VIE	Đặng Quang Tú
30	MF	VIE	Nguyễn Văn Bách
32	MF	VIE	Hồ Khắc Ngọc
33	DF	BRA	Jairo Rodrigues
55	DF	VIE	Hoàng Văn Khánh
77	MF	BRA	Luizão
83	FW	BRA	Bruno Paraíba
87	MF	FRA	Abdel-Amine Tran

=== Other players under contract ===
Note: Flags indicate national team as defined under FIFA eligibility rules; some limited exceptions apply. Players may hold more than one non-FIFA nationality.

No.	Pos.	Nation	Player
—	DF	VIE	Nguyễn Văn Sơn

=== Out on loan ===
Note: Flags indicate national team as defined under FIFA eligibility rules; some limited exceptions apply. Players may hold more than one non-FIFA nationality.

No.	Pos.	Nation	Player
13	FW	VIE	Phùng Văn Nam (to Lâm Đồng until 1 July 2027)
14	MF	VIE	Nguyễn Trọng Tuấn (to Hưng Yên until 1 July 2027)
23	GK	VIE	Nguyễn Văn Việt (to Thể Công-Viettel until 1 July 2027)
27	MF	VIE	Phạm Nguyễn Quốc Trung (to Thép Cần Thơ until 1 July 2027)
36	DF	VIE	Võ Tiến Thắng (to Xuân Thiện Phú Thọ until 1 July 2027)

No.	Pos.	Nation	Player
37	DF	VIE	Trương Văn Tuyến (to Xuân Thiện Phú Thọ until 1 July 2027)
88	DF	VIE	Nguyễn Tấn Minh (to Xuân Thiện Phú Thọ until 1 July 2027)
—	GK	VIE	Lê Trung Tuyến (to Hồng Lĩnh Hà Tĩnh until 1 July 2027)
—	FW	VIE	Phan Duy Hào (to Lâm Đồng until 1 July 2027)

== Current staff ==
Position	Name
Executive chairman	(Vietnam) Trần Quang Thưởng
Managing director	(Vietnam) Trần Tiến Đạt
Technical director	
Manager	(Vietnam) Văn Sỹ Sơn
Assistant	(Vietnam) Phạm Văn Quyến (Vietnam) Phạm Bùi Minh (Vietnam) Nguyễn Huy Hoàng
Fitness coach	(Brazil) Paulo Ramos Pereira
Technical analyst	(Vietnam) Nguyễn Quang Thọ
Goalkeeper coach	(Vietnam) Phạm Đức Anh
Interpreter	(Vietnam) Đậu Xuân Huy
Medical staff	(Vietnam) Đoàn Minh Hoàng
Logistics	(Vietnam) Phạm Văn Hùng (Vietnam) Nguyễn Ngọc Tú

== Managerial history ==
Name	Nat	Period	Titles
Nguyễn Thành Vinh	(Vietnam)	1980–2004	1998 Dunhill Cup; 1999–2000 V-League; 2000 Vietnamese Super Cup; 2000–01 V-League; 2001 Vietnamese Super Cup; 2002 Vietnamese Cup; 2002 Vietnamese Super Cup
Nguyễn Văn Thịnh	(Vietnam)	2004–2005	
Nguyễn Hữu Thắng	(Vietnam)	2005–2006	
Hà Thìn	(Vietnam)	2006–2007	
Nguyễn Văn Thịnh	(Vietnam)	2007–2009	
Nguyễn Hữu Thắng	(Vietnam)	2009–2014	2010 Vietnamese Cup; 2011 V-League; 2011 Vietnamese Super Cup
Ngô Quang Trường	(Vietnam)	2014–2016	
Nguyễn Đức Thắng	(Vietnam)	2016–2019	2017 Vietnamese Cup
Ngô Quang Trường	(Vietnam)	2019–2021	
Nguyễn Huy Hoàng	(Vietnam)	2021–2023	
Phan Như Thuật	(Vietnam)	2023–2024	
Phạm Anh Tuấn	(Vietnam)	2024	
Phan Như Thuật	(Vietnam)	2024–2025	
Văn Sỹ Sơn	(Vietnam)	2025–present	

=== Team captains ===
Name	Year
(Vietnam) Nguyễn Hữu Thắng	1993–1999
(Vietnam) Ngô Quang Trường	2000–2003
(Vietnam) Văn Sỹ Sơn	2004
(Vietnam) Nguyễn Huy Hoàng	2005–2012
(Vietnam) Nguyễn Trọng Hoàng	2013
(Vietnam) Lê Công Vinh	2014
(Vietnam) Nguyễn Quang Tình	2015
(Vietnam) Trần Nguyên Mạnh	2016–2019
(Vietnam) Hoàng Văn Khánh	2020–2022
(Vietnam) Quế Ngọc Hải	2023
(Nigeria) Michael Olaha	2023–2026
(Vietnam) Hồ Khắc Ngọc	2026–present

== Honours ==
League

- V.League 1:

(gold) Winners : 1999–2000, 2000–01, 2011
(silver) Runners-up : 1997, 1998, 2001–02
(bronze) Third place: 1992, 1996, 2009
Cup

- Vietnamese Cup:

(gold) Winners : 2001-02, 2010, 2017
(silver) Runners-up : 2011, 2024–25
(bronze) Third place: 1996, 1998, 2004, 2007, 2009, 2012, 2018

- Vietnamese Super Cup:

(gold) Winners : 2000, 2001, 2002, 2011
(silver) Runners-up : 2010, 2017

- Dunhill Cup:

(gold) Winners : 1998
(silver) Runners-up : 1999

=== Youth teams ===
- U-21:

(gold) Winners : 6 (2000, 2001, 2002, 2012, 2014, 2026)
(silver) Runners-up : 5 (2003, 2007, 2010, 2020, 2023)
(bronze) Third place: 4 (2004, 2011, 2013, 2017)

- U-19:

(gold) Winners : 6 (1999, 2001, 2004, 2005, 2006, 2025-26)
(silver) Runners-up : 7 (2002, 2007, 2011, 2013, 2014, 2023, 2024-25)
(bronze) Third place: 10 (1998, 2000, 2008, 2012, 2018, 2019, 2020, 2021, 2022, 2024)

- U-17:

(gold) Winners : 8 (2004, 2005, 2006, 2007, 2008, 2009, 2012, 2020)
(silver) Runners-up : 2 (2010, 2018)
(bronze) Third place: 3 (2015, 2022, 2023)

- U-15:

(gold) Winners : 5 (1998, 2002, 2018, 2019, 2022)
(silver) Runners-up : 3 (1999, 2008, 2023)
(bronze) Third place: 5 (2005, 2017, 2020, 2025, 2026)

- U-13:

(gold) Winners : 11 (1997, 1998, 2013, 2014, 2018, 2019, 2020, 2022, 2023, 2024, 2026)
(silver) Runners-up : 3 (2015, 2016, 2025)
(bronze) Third place: 2 (1999, 2017)

- U-11:

(gold) Winners : 5 (2017, 2018, 2019, 2020, 2022)
(silver) Runners-up : 1 (1997)
(bronze) Third place: 8 (1996, 1998, 1999, 2000, 2003, 2009, 2015, 2023)

- U-9:

(gold) Winners : 2 (2021, 2022)
(silver) Runners-up : 1 (2024)
(bronze) Third place: 2 (2023, 2025)

=== Other awards ===
- Third-class Labor Medal awarded by the State of the Socialist Republic of Vietnam
- Excellent emulation unit flag of Nghe An Provincial People's Committee for two consecutive years 1998, 1999–00
- The Government's emulation flag presented to the unit leading the emulation movement in 2000–01
- Unit flag for successfully completing the 2000–01 season mission of the People's Committee of Nghe An province

== Record ==
=== Continental record ===
- Asian Club Championship: 2 appearances

2000–01: First round
2001–02: withdrew in First round

- AFC Cup: 3 appearances

2011: Round of 16
2012: Group stage
2018: Group stage

Season	Competition	Round		Club	Home	Away
2000–01	Asian Club Championship	First round	(Indonesia)	PSM Makassar	1–4	0–0
2001–02	Asian Club Championship	First round	(Sri Lanka)	Saunders SC	(w/o)^{1}	
2011	AFC Cup	Group F	(Hong Kong)	TSW Pegasus FC	1–2	3–2
2011	AFC Cup	Group F	(Maldives)	VB Sports Club	4–2	3–1
2011	AFC Cup	Group F	(Indonesia)	Sriwijaya F.C.	4–0	1–3
2011	AFC Cup	Round of 16	(Indonesia)	Persipura Jayapura	1–3	
2012	AFC Cup	Group F	(Malaysia)	Terengganu	0–1	2–6
2012	AFC Cup	Group F	(Singapore)	Tampines Rovers	3–0	0–0
2012	AFC Cup	Group F	(Hong Kong)	Kitchee	1–0	0–2
2018	AFC Cup	Group H	(Indonesia)	Persija Jakarta	0–0	0–1
2018	AFC Cup	Group H	(Singapore)	Tampines Rovers	2–1	2–0
2018	AFC Cup	Group H	(Malaysia)	Johor Darul Ta'zim	2–0	2–3

^{1} Sông Lam Nghệ An withdrew.

=== Domestic league record ===
Season	Pld	Won	Draw	Lost	GF	GA	GD	PTS	Final position	Notes
1999–2000 V-League	24	11	10	3	35	20	+15	43	Champions	
2000–01 V-League	18	11	3	4	20	16	+4	36	Champions	Qualified for 2001–02 Asian Club Championship
2001–02 V-League	18	8	4	6	22	20	+2	28	2nd	
2003 V-League	22	9	5	8	25	16	+9	32	5th	
2004 V-League	22	9	10	3	38	17	+21	37	4th	
2005 V-League	22	8	7	7	33	28	+5	31	5th	
2006 V-League	24	9	9	6	27	27	0	26	5th	
2007 V-League	26	8	11	7	38	35	+3	35	7th	
2008 V-League	26	10	7	9	45	35	+10	37	9th	
2009 V-League	26	11	10	5	39	28	+11	43	3rd	
2010 V-League	26	9	10	7	36	26	+10	37	8th	Qualified for 2011 AFC Cup
2011 V-League	26	15	4	7	48	29	+19	49	Champions	Qualified for 2012 AFC Cup
2012 V-League	26	9	14	3	44	30	+14	41	4th	
2013 V.League 1	20	9	6	5	40	24	+16	33	4th	
2014 V.League 1	22	10	6	6	38	26	+12	36	5th	
2015 V.League 1	26	10	7	9	36	33	+3	37	7th	
2016 V.League 1	26	9	7	10	34	36	−2	34	9th	
2017 V.League 1	26	8	10	8	36	36	0	34	8th	Qualified for 2018 AFC Cup
2018 V.League 1	26	12	6	8	38	32	+6	42	4th	
2019 V.League 1	26	8	11	7	32	26	+6	35	7th	
2020 V.League 1	20	6	5	7	17	21	–4	23	10th	
2021 V.League 1	12	3	1	8	7	15	–8	10	14th	League was cancelled due to COVID-19
2022 V.League 1	24	9	6	9	29	28	+1	33	5th	
2023 V.League 1	18	6	7	5	19	20	-1	25	9th	
2023–24 V.League 1	26	7	9	10	27	32	−5	30	12th	
2024–25 V.League 1	26	5	11	10	22	36	−14	26	12th	

=== National cup record ===
- 2011: Runner-up
- 2012: Semifinals
- 2013: Round of 16
- 2014: Round of 16
- 2015: Quarterfinals
- 2016: Round of 16
- 2017: Champion
- 2018: Semifinals
- 2019: Round of 16
- 2020: Round of 16
- 2021: Qualifying round
- 2022: Qualifying round
- 2023: Qualifying round
- 2024: Round of 16
