= 2025–26 V.League 1 =

70th season of the highest division of association football in Vietnam

V.League 1
- Season: 2025–26
- Dates: 15 August 2025 – 7 June 2026
- Champions: Cong An Hanoi; 2nd VL1 title 3rd Vietnamese title
- Relegated: Becamex Ho Chi Minh City; PVF-CAND (via play-off)
- AFC Champions League Elite: Cong An Hanoi
- AFC Champions League Two: The Cong–Viettel
- ASEAN Club Championship: Cong An Hanoi; Cong An Ho Chi Minh City (via Vietnamese Cup)
- Matches: 182
- Goals: 478 (2.63 per match)
- Top goalscorer: Alan Grafite (16 goals)
- Biggest home win: Cong An Hanoi 5–1 SHB Da Nang (4 April 2026)
- Biggest away win: The Cong-Viettel 1–4 Song Lam Nghe An (8 February 2026)
- Highest scoring: Cong An HCMC 3–4 Ninh Binh (9 November 2025)
- Longest winning run: Ninh Binh (4 matches)
- Longest unbeaten run: Cong An Hanoi (12 matches)
- Longest winless run: Dong A Thanh Hoa (7 matches)
- Longest losing run: Becamex HCMC (4 matches)
- Highest attendance: 16,900; Cong An Hanoi 3–2 Thep Xanh Nam Dinh (10 May 2026)
- Lowest attendance: 800; PVF-CAND 1–0 Dong A Thanh Hoa (19 October 2025)
- Attendance: 1,037,300 (5,699 per match)

The 2025–26 V.League 1 (Vietnamese: Giải bóng đá Vô địch quốc gia 2025/26) (referred to as the 2025–26 LPBank V.League 1 for sponsorship purposes, Vietnamese: Giải bóng đá Vô địch Quốc gia LPBank 2025/26) was the 43rd season of the V.League 1, the highest division of Vietnamese football and the 26th as a professional league. The season was scheduled to begin on 15 August 2025 and concluded on 7 June 2026.

The fixtures were drawn and released on 14 July 2025 at 16:15 ICT. The fixtures was later continued the draw on 4 August 2025.

Thep Xanh Nam Dinh were the two-time defending champions, but Cong An Hanoi became the champions with just 3 games to spare, winning their 3rd title.

There was a 60-days break from 24 November 2025 to 23 January 2026 for Vietnam U-23 to compete in the 2025 SEA Games and the 2026 AFC U-23 Asian Cup.

== Teams ==
A total of 14 teams participated in the V.League 1 2025–26 season.

=== Format changes ===
Starting from this season, there will be 2 relegation spots and the relegation play-off game has been removed.

However, on 16 September 2025, following the withdrawal of two teams in the V.League 2, the Vietnam Football Federation restored the 1,5 relegation spots like the previous season.

=== Changes from previous season ===
Locations of the 2025–26 V.League 1 teams
Hanoi V.League 1 football clubs

Promoted from 2024–25 V.League 2	Relegated to 2025–26 V.League 2	Not engaged
Phu Dong Ninh Binh; PVF-CAND	Quy Nhon Binh Dinh	Quang Nam

Quy Nhon Binh Dinh relegated after finishing as runners-up in the 2023–24 season, ending their 4 consecutive years in Vietnamese top-flight.

Phu Dong Ninh Binh made their first appearance in the V.League 1. This marked the return of a team from what is the pre-merger Ninh Binh to the league after 11 years following the dissolution of Vissai Ninh Binh in 2014.

On 1 August 2025, Quang Nam missed the league's registration deadline, thereby confirming their withdrawal from the league. On 4 August, VPF confirmed that 2024–25 V.League 2's third placed team PVF-CAND will replace Quang Nam's slot, following Truong Tuoi Dong Nai's refusal to participate. This is PVF-CAND's first ever appearance in the V.League 1.

=== Name changes ===
- In June 2025, Phu Dong Ninh Binh FC changed their name to Ninh Binh FC.
- On 14 July 2025, Becamex Binh Duong changed their name to Becamex Ho Chi Minh City FC.
- In the same day, Ho Chi Minh City FC changed their name to Cong An Ho Chi Minh City FC.

=== Stadiums and locations ===
Team	Location	Stadium	Capacity	Previous season rank
Becamex Ho Chi Minh City	Ho Chi Minh City	Binh Duong	13,035	VL1 (7th)
Cong An Ho Chi Minh City	Ho Chi Minh City	Thong Nhat; Binh Duong (Note: From February 2026, Cong An Ho Chi Minh City's home stadium Thong Nhat closed for renovation works for 2026 Vietnam National Games. As the result, the club would share the Bình Dương with Becamex Ho Chi Minh City.)	14,400; 13,035	VL1 (10th)
Dong A Thanh Hoa	Thanh Hoa	Thanh Hoa	12,000	VL1 (8th)
Haiphong FC	Haiphong	Lach Tray	30,000	VL1 (6th)
Cong An Hanoi	Hanoi	Hang Day	22,500	VL1 (3rd)
Hanoi FC	Hanoi	Hang Day	22,500	VL1 (2nd)
The Cong-Viettel	Hanoi	My Dinh; Hang Day (Note: The Cong-Viettel's home stadium My Dinh was under maintenance. As the result, the club would share the Hang Day Stadium with other Hanoi-based teams from January 2026.)	40,200; 22,500	VL1 (4th)
Hoang Anh Gia Lai	Gia Lai	Pleiku	12,000	VL1 (9th)
Hong Linh Ha Tinh	Ha Tinh	Ha Tinh	20,000	VL1 (5th)
Ninh Binh FC	Ninh Binh	Ninh Binh	25,000	▲VL2 (1st)
Thep Xanh Nam Dinh	Ninh Binh	Thien Truong	30,000	VL1 (1st)
PVF-CAND	Hưng Yên	PVF	4,500	▲VL2 (3rd)
SHB Da Nang	Da Nang	Chi Lang (Note: On 24 December 2025, Hoà Xuân Stadium officially changed its name to Chi Lăng)	20,500	VL1 (13th)
Song Lam Nghe An	Nghe An	Vinh	18,000	VL1 (12th)

=== Number of teams by region ===
Number	Region	Team(s)
7	Red River Delta	Cong An Hanoi, Haiphong, Hanoi FC, Ninh Binh, PVF-CAND, The Cong-Viettel and Thep Xanh Nam Dinh
3	North Central	Dong A Thanh Hoa, Hong Linh Ha Tinh and Song Lam Nghe An
2	Southeast	Becamex Ho Chi Minh City and Cong An Ho Chi Minh City
1	Central Highlands	Hoang Anh Gia Lai
1	South Central	SHB Da Nang

== Personnel and kits ==
All teams were obligated to have the logo of the league sponsor LPBank on their left sleeve.

Note: Flags indicate national team as has been defined under FIFA eligibility rules. Players may hold more than one non-FIFA nationality.

Team	Manager	Captain	Kit manufacturer	Kit sponsor(s)	
Team	Manager	Captain	Kit manufacturer	Main	Other(s)
Becamex Ho Chi Minh City	(Vietnam) Hứa Hiền Vinh	(Vietnam) Ngô Tùng Quốc	(Vietnam) Kamito	Becamex	List: Front: None; Back: None; Sleeves: None; Shorts: None
Cong An Hanoi	(Brazil) Alexandré Pölking	(Vietnam) Nguyễn Quang Hải	(Japan) Jogarbola	Công An Hà Nội	List: Front: None; Back: None; Sleeves: None; Shorts: None
Cong An Ho Chi Minh City	(Vietnam) Phùng Thanh Phương (caretaker)	(Vietnam) Nguyễn Tiến Linh	(Japan) Jogarbola	Công An TP. Hồ Chí Minh	List: Front: VPBank, Sacombank; Back: Eximbank; Sleeves: None; Shorts: None
Dong A Thanh Hoa	(Vietnam) Nguyễn Anh Đức	(Vietnam) Doãn Ngọc Tân	(Vietnam) Wika	Đông Á Group	List: Front: None; Back: None; Sleeves: V-Odyssey; Shorts: None
Haiphong	(Vietnam) Đặng Văn Thành	(Vietnam) Triệu Việt Hưng	(Italy) Kappa	Macland^{2}	List: Front: None; Back: None; Sleeves: None; Shorts: None
Hanoi FC	(Australia) Harry Kewell	(Vietnam) Nguyễn Văn Quyết	(Japan) Jogarbola	T&T Homes	List: Front: None; Back: SHS, Quảng Ninh Port, Vinawind, Hanaka Group; Sleeves: None; Shorts: None
Hoang Anh Gia Lai	(Vietnam) Lê Quang Trãi	(Brazil) Jairo Rodrigues	(Vietnam) Motive	ThaiGroup	List: Front: None; Back: LPBank; Sleeves: None; Shorts: None
Hong Linh Ha Tinh	(Vietnam) Phan Như Thuật	(Vietnam) Nguyễn Trọng Hoàng	(Thailand) Grand Sport	Bia Sao Vàng	List: Front: Savabeco; Back: None; Sleeves: None; Shorts: None
Ninh Binh	(Vietnam) Chu Đình Nghiêm	(Vietnam) Nguyễn Hoàng Đức	(Thailand) Grand Sport	LPBank	List: Front: None; Back: ThaiGroup; Sleeves: None; Shorts: None
PVF-CAND	(Vietnam) Trần Tiến Đại (caretaker)	(Vietnam) Nguyễn Huy Hùng	(Japan) Jogarbola	MobiFone	List: Front: None; Back: KinhBac City Development Holding; Sleeves: None; Shorts: None
SHB Da Nang	(Vietnam) Lê Đức Tuấn	(Vietnam) Đặng Anh Tuấn	(Vietnam) Wika	SHB	List: Front: Pomina Flat Steel,Takara; Back: 389 Corporation, Murata; Sleeves: None; Shorts: None
Song Lam Nghe An	(Vietnam) Văn Sỹ Sơn	(Nigeria) Michael Olaha	(Vietnam) Kamito	Gạo A An	List: Front: Bia Sao Vàng; Back: Eurosun; Sleeves: None; Shorts: None
The Cong-Viettel	(Bulgaria) Velizar Popov	(Vietnam) Bùi Tiến Dũng	(China) Li-Ning	Thể Công-Viettel	List: Front: None; Back: TV360, Petrolimex; Sleeves: None; Shorts: None
Thep Xanh Nam Dinh	(Vietnam) Vũ Hồng Việt	(Vietnam) Trần Nguyên Mạnh	(Japan) Jogarbola	Thép Xanh Xuân Thiện	List: Front: None; Back: Xi Măng Xuân Thành; Sleeves: None; Shorts: None

Notes

1. Apparel made by club
2. Haiphong were sponsored by ThaiGroup (front) and LPBank (back) in the first half of the season

=== Managerial changes ===
Team	Outgoing manager	Manner of departure	Date of vacancy	Position in the table	Incoming manager	Date of appointment
Ninh Binh	(Vietnam) Nguyễn Việt Thắng	Mutual consent	21 June 2025	Pre-season	(Spain) Gerard Albadalejo	2 July 2025
Cong An Ho Chi Minh City	(Vietnam) Phùng Thanh Phương	End of contract	1 July 2025	Pre-season	(Vietnam) Lê Huỳnh Đức	15 July 2025
Dong A Thanh Hoa	(Croatia) Tomislav Steinbrückner	End of contract	1 July 2025	Pre-season	(South Korea) Choi Won-kwon	14 July 2025
Hong Linh Ha Tinh	(Vietnam) Nguyễn Thành Công	Resigned	2 July 2025	Pre-season	(Vietnam) Nguyễn Công Mạnh	5 July 2025
Hanoi FC	(Japan) Makoto Teguramori	Sacked	16 September 2025	11th	(Japan) Yusuke Adachi (caretaker)	16 September 2025
Becamex Ho Chi Minh City	(Vietnam) Nguyễn Anh Đức	Resigned	30 September 2025	12th	(Vietnam) Đặng Trần Chỉnh (caretaker)	30 September 2025
Hanoi FC	(Japan) Yusuke Adachi	End of caretaker period	4 October 2025	6th	(Australia) Harry Kewell	4 October 2025
Song Lam Nghe An	(Vietnam) Phan Như Thuật	Resigned	4 October 2025	10th	(Vietnam) Văn Sỹ Sơn	7 October 2025
Thep Xanh Nam Dinh	(Vietnam) Vũ Hồng Việt	Appointed as technical director	24 October 2025	10th	(Vietnam) Nguyễn Trung Kiên	24 October 2025
Thep Xanh Nam Dinh	(Vietnam) Nguyễn Trung Kiên	Demoted to assistant coach	14 November 2025	10th	(Portugal) Mauro Jerónimo	14 November 2025
Dong A Thanh Hoa	(South Korea) Choi Won-kwon	Mutual consent	15 November 2025	11th	(Vietnam) Mai Xuân Hợp	15 November 2025
PVF-CAND	(Vietnam) Thạch Bảo Khanh	Sacked	24 November 2025	13th	(Vietnam) Nguyễn Thành Công	25 November 2025
Becamex Ho Chi Minh City	(Vietnam) Đặng Trần Chỉnh (caretaker)	End of caretaker period	30 January 2026	8th	(Japan) Nobuhiro Ueno	30 January 2026
Thep Xanh Nam Dinh	(Portugal) Mauro Jerónimo	Mutual consent	26 February 2026	10th	(Vietnam) Vũ Hồng Việt	26 February 2026
Ninh Binh	(Spain) Gerard Albadalejo	Sacked	2 March 2026	2nd	(Vietnam) Vũ Tiến Thành (caretaker)	3 March 2026
PVF-CAND	(Vietnam) Nguyễn Thành Công	Resigned	10 March 2026	14th	(Vietnam) Trần Tiến Đại (caretaker)	15 March 2026
Ninh Binh	(Vietnam) Vũ Tiến Thành (caretaker)	Appointed as Technical director	15 April 2026	3rd	(South Korea) Bae Ji-won	15 April 2026
Hong Linh Ha Tinh	(Vietnam) Nguyễn Công Mạnh	Sacked	3 May 2026	9th	(Vietnam) Phan Như Thuật	5 May 2026
Cong An Ho Chi Minh City	(Vietnam) Lê Huỳnh Đức	Resigned	5 May 2026	6th	(Vietnam) Phùng Thanh Phương (caretaker)	5 May 2026
Haiphong	(Vietnam) Chu Đình Nghiêm	Signed by Ninh Binh	5 May 2026	7th	(Vietnam) Đặng Văn Thành	5 May 2026
Becamex Ho Chi Minh City	(Japan) Nobuhiro Ueno	Mutual consent	14 May 2026	12th	(Vietnam) Hứa Hiền Vinh	14 May 2026
Ninh Binh	(South Korea) Bae Ji-won	Appointed as Assistant coach	26 May 2026	3rd	(Vietnam) Chu Đình Nghiêm	26 May 2026
Dong A Thanh Hoa	(Vietnam) Mai Xuân Hợp	Appointed as Technical director	30 May 2026	10th	(Vietnam) Nguyễn Anh Đức	30 May 2026

Notes

1. AFC Pro License: These managers were not allowed to be registered as team manager as they did not have the AFC Professional Coaching Diploma

== Foreign players ==
Beginning of this season, teams are allowed to register 4 foreign players, with maximum 3 players allowed to play on the field at the same moment. Teams that participate in any intercontentinal or sub-contentinal competition are allowed to register 7 foreign players, but only 4 players are allowed to be registered each game. Furthermore, teams can register up to 2 foreign players with Vietnamese heritage.

Players name in bold indicates the player was registered after the start of the season.

Club	Player 1	Player 2	Player 3	Player 4	Player 5 (Unnaturalized Vietnamese player)	Player 6 (Unnaturalized Vietnamese player)	Player 7 (AFC and AFF competitions)	Player 8 (AFC and AFF competitions)	Player 9 (AFC and AFF competitions)	Unregistred / Former players
Becamex Ho Chi Minh City	(Belgium) **Elisha Sam**	(Nigeria) Ugochukwu Oduenyi	(Portugal) Hugo Alves	(Serbia) Miloš Zlatković						(Finland) Tony Pham (Nigeria) Origbaajo Ismaila
Cong An Hanoi	(Australia) Stefan Mauk	(Brazil) Léo Artur	(Brazil) China	(Brazil) Hugo Gomes	(France) Leygley Adou	(Republic of Ireland) Brandon Ly	(Brazil) Alan Grafite	(Brazil) Vitão		
Cong An Ho Chi Minh City	(Australia) Peter Makrillos	(Brazil) Matheus Felipe	(Brazil) Raphael Utzig	(Malaysia) Endrick	(England) Lee Williams					(England) Noel Mbo
Dong A Thanh Hoa	(Bosnia and Herzegovina) **Amar Ćatić**	(Jamaica) Rimario Gordon	(Kyrgyzstan) Odilzhon Abdurakhmanov	(Nicaragua) **Matías Belli**	(Laos) Damoth Thongkhamsavath					(Brazil) Ribamar (Senegal) Mamadou Mbodj
Haiphong	(Brazil) Luiz Antônio	(Cameroon) Joel Tagueu	(Jamaica) **Jourdaine Fletcher**	(Portugal) **Jucie Lupeta**	(Canada) **Camilo Vasconcelos**					(Haiti) Bicou Bissainthe (Nigeria) Fred Friday (Uganda) Moses Oloya
Hanoi FC	(Brazil) Adriel	(Brazil) Luiz Fernando	(Brazil) Daniel Passira	(England) **David Fisher**						(Brazil) Willian Maranhão (Canada) Pierre Lamothe
Hoang Anh Gia Lai	(Brazil) **Júnior Batista**	(Brazil) Gabriel Conceição	(Brazil) Marciel	(Brazil) Jairo Rodrigues	(France) Ryan Ha					(Brazil) Khevin Fraga
Hong Linh Ha Tinh	(Brazil) Helerson	(Brazil) **Welder**	(Nigeria) Charles Atshimene	(Nigeria) Joseph Onoja						(Guinea-Bissau) João Pereira (Ukraine) Yevhen Serdyuk
Ninh Binh	(Brazil) Gustavo Henrique	(Brazil) Janclesio	(Brazil) Patrick Marcelino	(Nigeria) **Fred Friday**						(Brazil) Daniel dos Anjos (France) Evan Abran
PVF-CAND	(Brazil) **Lucas Turci**	(Palestine) **Mahmoud Eid**	(Scotland) **Alastair Reynolds**	(Uganda) Joseph Mpande	(Germany) Nguyen Nhu Duc Anh					(Brazil) Amarildo (Brazil) Marco Antônio (Cameroon) Alain Eyenga (Trinidad and Tobago) Shaqkeem Joseph
SHB Da Nang	(Argentina) **Joel López Pissano**	(Brazil) **Ribamar**	(Serbia) Milan Makarić	(Togo) David Henen	(Canada) **Pierre Lamothe**					(Brazil) Emerson Souza (South Korea) Kim Dong-su
Song Lam Nghe An	(Cape Verde) **Carlos Fortes**	(Nigeria) Michael Olaha	(Trinidad and Tobago) Justin Garcia	(Trinidad and Tobago) Reon Moore	(France) **Phi-Long Tran**					(Colombia) Carlos Rentería
The Cong-Viettel	(Brazil) Lucão do Break	(Brazil) Paulinho Curuá	(Brazil) Pedro Henrique	(Brazil) Wesley Natã	(Poland) Damian Vu Thanh	(United States) Kyle Colonna				
Thep Xanh Nam Dinh	(Brazil) Lucas Alves	(Brazil) Caio César	(Brazil) Brenner Marlos	(Brazil) Rômulo	(France) Kevin Pham Ba		(Democratic Republic of the Congo) **Chadrac Akolo**	(Democratic Republic of the Congo) **Arnaud Lusamba**	(South Africa) Percy Tau	(Brazil) Caíque (Brazil) Wálber (England) Kyle Hudlin (Netherlands) Mitchell Dijks (Norway) Kristoffer Normann Hansen (Palestine) Mahmoud Eid (South Africa) Njabulo Blom

=== Dual nationality Vietnamese players ===
- Players name in **bold** indicates the player was registered after the start of the season.
- Player's name in italics indicates Overseas Vietnamese players whom have obtained a Vietnamese passport and citizenship, therefore being considered as local players.

Club	Player 1	Player 2	Player 3
Becamex Ho Chi Minh City	(Czech Republic) (Vietnam) Mạc Hồng Quân^{1}	(Germany) (Vietnam) Bùi Đức Duy^{1}	(Uganda) (Vietnam) Trần Trung Hiếu
Cong An Hanoi	(France) (Vietnam) Cao Pendant Quang Vinh^{1}	(Czech Republic) (Vietnam) Nguyễn Filip^{1}	
Cong An Ho Chi Minh City	(Australia) (Vietnam) Ngô Đăng Khoa	(Slovakia) (Vietnam) Lê Giang Patrik	
Dong A Thanh Hoa			
Haiphong			
Hanoi FC	(Brazil) (Vietnam) Đỗ Hoàng Hên^{1}		
Hoang Anh Gia Lai	(Thailand) (Vietnam) Chaloongphum Phong		
Hong Linh Ha Tinh	(Russia) (Vietnam) Lê Viktor		
Ninh Binh	(Brazil) (Vietnam) Nguyễn Tài Lộc	(Bulgaria) (Vietnam) Trần Thành Trung	(Russia) (Vietnam) Đặng Văn Lâm^{1}
PVF-CAND	(Nigeria) (Vietnam) Hoàng Vũ Samson		
SHB Da Nang	(Brazil) (Vietnam) Đỗ Phi Long	(Russia) (Vietnam) Nguyễn Vadim	
Song Lam Nghe An			
The Cong-Viettel	(Czech Republic) (Vietnam) Dương Thanh Tùng		
Thep Xanh Nam Dinh	(Brazil) (Vietnam) Nguyễn Xuân Son^{1}		

Notes:

^1 Capped for Vietnam national team.
^2 Player is under the process of Vietnamese naturalization, thus is not counted as a foreign player slot.

== League table ==
Pos	Team	Pld	W	D	L	GF	GA	GD	Pts	Qualification or relegation
1	Cong An Hanoi (C)	26	20	4	2	58	22	+36	64	Qualification for the AFC Champions League Elite preliminary stage and ASEAN Club Championship group stage
2	The Cong-Viettel	26	15	9	2	39	21	+18	54	Qualification for the AFC Champions League Two group stage
3	Ninh Binh	26	15	6	5	53	31	+22	51	
4	Hanoi FC	26	14	4	8	48	30	+18	46	
5	Cong An Ho Chi Minh City	26	10	6	10	28	36	−8	36	Qualification for the ASEAN Club Championship group stage (Note: Cong An Ho Chi Minh City, the winners of the 2025–26 Vietnamese Cup, qualified for the ASEAN Club Championship group stage.)
6	Thep Xanh Nam Dinh	26	9	8	9	33	32	+1	35	
7	Haiphong	26	9	5	12	37	36	+1	32	
8	Hong Linh Ha Tinh	26	7	8	11	15	29	−14	29	
9	Song Lam Nghe An	26	7	6	13	27	40	−13	27	
10	Hoang Anh Gia Lai	26	6	8	12	24	37	−13	26	
11	Dong A Thanh Hoa	26	5	10	11	26	38	−12	25	
12	SHB Da Nang	26	5	9	12	33	39	−6	24 (Note: Head-to-head points: SHB Da Nang 10, PVF-CAND 5, Becamex Ho Chi Minh City 1.)	
13	PVF-CAND (R)	26	5	9	12	26	44	−18	24	Qualification for the relegation play-offs
14	Becamex Ho Chi Minh City (R)	26	6	6	14	31	43	−12	24	Relegation to V.League 2

Source: VPF
Rules for classification: 1) Points; 2) Head-to-head points; 3) Head-to-head goal difference; 4) Head-to-head goals scored; 5) Goal difference; 6) Goals scored; 7) Away goals scored; 8) Disciplinary points.
(C) Champions; (R) Relegated

== Results ==
Home \ Away	BHC	CAH	CHC	DTH	HPG	HAN	HGL	HHT	NBI	PVF	SDN	SNA	TCV	TND
Becamex Ho Chi Minh City	—	0–3	1–3	1–1	2–1	2–3	3–1	2–0	1–2	1–2	1–2	0–1	1–3	1–1
Cong An Hanoi	2–1	—	1–0	2–0	2–1	4–2	3–1	3–0	3–2	2–0	5–1	4–2	1–1	3–2
Cong An Ho Chi Minh City	0–1	0–3	—	1–2	1–2	2–1	1–0	0–0	3–4	1–0	2–2	3–1	1–1	0–0
Dong A Thanh Hoa	1–1	1–3	4–0	—	2–2	1–0	1–1	0–1	0–2	1–0	1–1	1–1	0–1	2–2
Haiphong	4–2	0–2	3–0	3–3	—	1–0	3–0	2–1	2–2	3–1	3–1	2–0	1–2	1–1
Hanoi FC	4–2	2–1	1–1	2–1	2–0	—	0–0	3–0	1–2	4–0	2–1	3–0	1–1	2–1
Hoang Anh Gia Lai	0–3	1–3	0–1	1–1	0–0	3–1	—	0–2	1–2	1–2	1–0	1–1	2–1	2–2
Hong Linh Ha Tinh	0–0	1–1	0–1	1–0	1–0	2–1	1–0	—	1–3	1–1	0–0	0–1	0–2	0–2
Ninh Binh	1–1	1–2	1–1	4–0	2–1	2–3	1–2	3–0	—	3–0	1–1	1–0	1–1	2–0
PVF-CAND	1–1	1–1	1–2	2–2	3–1	0–4	0–0	0–0	1–3	—	2–2	2–1	2–2	0–1
SHB Da Nang	2–0	0–1	0–1	4–0	2–0	0–2	3–3	0–1	1–3	3–0	—	1–1	3–3	1–2
Song Lam Nghe An	2–1	1–1	2–3	0–1	1–0	1–3	0–1	1–1	1–2	1–3	1–0	—	1–1	2–1
The Cong-Viettel	2–0	1–0	3–0	1–0	1–0	1–0	1–0	2–0	1–1	1–1	2–1	1–4	—	1–0
Thep Xanh Nam Dinh	1–2	0–2	2–0	1–0	2–1	1–1	1–2	1–1	3–2	2–1	1–1	3–0	0–2	—

Source: VPF
Legend: Blue = home team win; Yellow = draw; Red = away team win.

=== Position by round ===
Team ╲ Round	1	2	3	4	5	6	7	8	9	10	11	12	13	14	15	16	17	18	19	20	21	22	23	24	25	26
Thep Xanh Nam Dinh	3	6	5	7	7	8	10	8	8	9	10	9	10	10	9	7	7	7	6	7	5	6	7	6	6	6
Hanoi FC	11	12	11	12	9	6	7	6	7	7	6	6	4	4	4	4	4	4	4	4	3	4	4	3	4	4
Cong An Hanoi	9	2	2	2	2	2	3	2	2	2	2	1	1	1	1	1	1	1	1	1	1	1	1	1	1	1
The Cong-Viettel	7	3	3	4	4	4	2	3	3	3	4	3	3	2	2	2	2	2	2	2	2	2	2	2	2	2
Haiphong	10	4	4	5	5	5	5	4	4	4	3	4	5	5	6	6	6	5	5	6	7	7	6	7	7	7
Becamex Ho Chi Minh City	1	5	9	10	12	12	9	10	9	8	8	8	12	11	10	10	10	10	10	11	12	12	12	12	14	14
Hong Linh Ha Tinh	13	9	6	6	6	7	6	7	6	6	7	7	7	7	7	8	8	9	9	9	9	10	8	8	8	8
Dong A Thanh Hoa	8	14	14	13	14	14	13	11	13	12	11	12	11	12	12	12	11	12	12	10	11	8	9	10	11	11
Hoang Anh Gia Lai	14	13	13	14	13	13	14	14	14	13	12	10	8	8	11	11	12	11	11	12	10	11	11	11	10	10
Cong An Ho Chi Minh City	4	10	7	3	3	3	4	5	5	5	5	5	6	6	5	5	5	6	7	5	6	5	5	5	5	5
Song Lam Nghe An	12	7	10	9	11	10	11	12	10	10	9	11	9	9	8	9	9	8	8	8	8	9	10	9	9	9
SHB Da Nang	6	11	12	11	8	11	12	13	11	11	14	14	14	14	13	13	13	14	14	13	14	14	13	13	12	12
Ninh Binh	2	1	1	1	1	1	1	1	1	1	1	2	2	3	3	3	3	3	3	3	4	3	3	4	3	3
PVF-CAND	5	8	8	8	10	9	8	9	12	14	13	13	13	13	14	14	14	13	13	14	13	13	14	14	13	13

Champion and qualification to the AFC Champions League Elite and ASEAN Club Championship
Qualification to the AFC Champions League Two
Qualification for relegation play-offs
Relegation to V.League 2

Source: VPF

== Promotion/relegation play-offs ==
The 2025–26 season ended with a promotion/relegation play-off game between the 13th-placed V.League 1 team, PVF-CAND and the V.League 2 runner-up, Bac Ninh, which took place on 12 June 2026.

12 June 2026
18:00

PVF-CAND	1–1	Bac Ninh
Samson 55'	Report	Cantanhede 33' (pen.)
Penalties
Nguyễn Văn Dũng (penalty scored); Nguyễn Văn Vinh (penalty missed); Phạm Lý Đức (penalty scored); Trương Văn Thái Quý (penalty scored); Thái Bá Đạt (penalty missed); Nguyễn Huy Hùng (penalty scored); Nguyễn Vũ Tín (penalty missed)	4–5	(penalty missed) Cantanhede; (penalty scored) Nguyễn Văn Đạt; (penalty missed) Phan Văn Hiếu; (penalty scored) Hà Đức Chinh; (penalty scored) Nguyễn Trọng Sơn; (penalty scored) Phan Thế Hưng; (penalty scored) Nguyễn Thanh Khôi

Hà Tĩnh Stadium, Hà Tĩnh
Attendance: 6,900
Referee: Ahmad A'Qashah (Singapore)

Bac Ninh won 5–4 by penalties after 1–1 draw and were promoted to the V.League 1, while PVF-CAND were relegated to the V.League 2.

== Season statistics ==
=== Top scorers ===
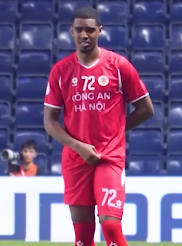
Alan Grafite won his second top scorer award in two seasons after scoring 16 goals for Cong An Hanoi.

Rank	Player	Club	Goals
1	(Brazil) Alan Grafite	Cong An Hanoi	16
2	(Brazil) Lucão do Break	The Cong–Viettel	11
2	(Vietnam) Đỗ Hoàng Hên	Hanoi FC	11
2	(Serbia) Milan Makarić	SHB Da Nang	11
5	(Cameroon) Joel Tagueu	Haiphong	10
5	(Vietnam) Nguyễn Đình Bắc	Cong An Hanoi	10
5	(Brazil) Léo Artur	Cong An Hanoi	10
8	(Nigeria) Michael Olaha	Song Lam Nghe An	9
8	(Brazil) Geovane Magno	Ninh Binh	9
8	(Nigeria) Fred Friday	Haiphong / Ninh Binh	9

=== Hat-tricks ===
Player	For	Against	Result	Date
(Brazil) Alan Grafite	Cong An Hanoi	Hanoi FC	4–2 (H)	28 August 2025
(Brazil) Alan Grafite	Cong An Hanoi	Ninh Binh	3–2 (H)	1 February 2026
(Vietnam) Nguyễn Đình Bắc	Cong An Hanoi	Song Lam Nghe An	4–2 (H)	26 April 2026
(Vietnam) Nguyễn Xuân Son	Thep Xanh Nam Dinh	Song Lam Nghe An	3–0 (H)	31 May 2026

=== Clean sheets ===
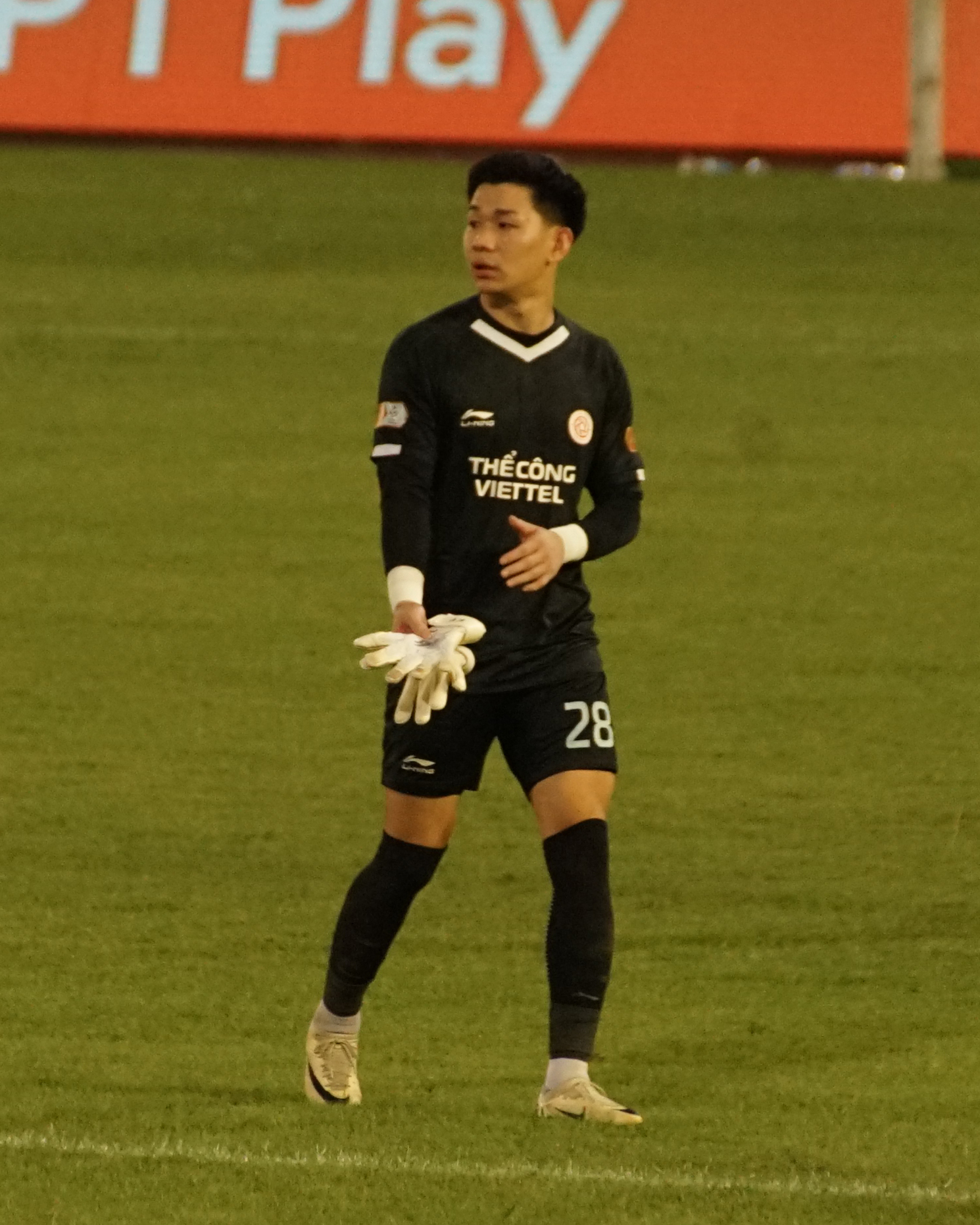
Nguyễn Văn Việt has kept 12 clean sheets for The Cong-Viettel, becoming the player with most clean sheets on the season.

Rank	Player	Club	Clean sheets
1	(Vietnam) Nguyễn Văn Việt	The Cong-Viettel	12
2	(Vietnam) Nguyễn Thanh Tùng	Hong Linh Ha Tinh	10
2	(Vietnam) Đặng Văn Lâm	Ninh Binh	10
4	(Vietnam) Nguyễn Đình Triệu	Haiphong	7
4	(Slovakia) Patrik Le Giang	Cong An Ho Chi Minh City	7
4	(Vietnam) Quan Văn Chuẩn	Hanoi FC	7
4	(Vietnam) Nguyễn Filip	Cong An Hanoi	7
8	(Vietnam) Trần Nguyên Mạnh	Thep Xanh Nam Dinh	5
8	(Vietnam) Trần Trung Kiên	Hoang Anh Gia Lai	5
8	(Vietnam) Cao Văn Bình	Song Lam Nghe An	5
8	(Vietnam) Nguyễn Văn Toản	SHB Da Nang	5

== Awards ==
=== Monthly awards ===
Monthly awards began after round 5 of V.League 1 this season.

Month	Club of the Month	Manager of the Month		Player of the Month		Goal of the Month		References
Month	Club	Player	Club	Player	Club	Player	Club	References
September	Ninh Binh	(Royal Spanish Football Federation) Gerard Albadalejo	Ninh Binh	(Brazilian Football Confederation) Alan Grafite	Cong An Hanoi	(Vietnam Football Federation) Ngô Văn Lương	Song Lam Nghe An	
November	Cong An Hanoi	(Brazilian Football Confederation) Alexandré Pölking	Cong An Hanoi	(Vietnam Football Federation) Nguyễn Hoàng Đức	Ninh Binh	(Vietnam Football Federation) Nguyễn Quốc Việt	Ninh Binh	
March	Cong An Hanoi	(Brazilian Football Confederation) Alexandré Pölking	Cong An Hanoi	(Brazilian Football Confederation) Alan Grafite	Cong An Hanoi	(Vietnam Football Federation) Đoàn Văn Hậu	Cong An Hanoi	
April	Cong An Hanoi	(Brazilian Football Confederation) Alexandré Pölking	Cong An Hanoi	(Vietnam Football Federation) Nguyễn Đình Bắc	Cong An Hanoi	(Vietnam Football Federation) Giáp Tuấn Dương	Thep Xanh Nam Dinh	
May	Cong An Hanoi	(Brazilian Football Confederation) Alexandré Pölking	Cong An Hanoi	(Brazilian Football Confederation) Alan Grafite	Cong An Hanoi	(Vietnam Football Federation) Nguyễn Xuân Son	Thep Xanh Nam Dinh	

=== Annual awards ===
Award	Winner	Club
Manager of the Year	(Brazil) Alexandré Pölking	Cong An Hanoi
Player of the Year	(Vietnam) Nguyễn Quang Hải	Cong An Hanoi
Best Young Player	(Vietnam) Nguyễn Đình Bắc	Cong An Hanoi
Goal of the Year	(Vietnam) Đoàn Văn Hậu	Cong An Hanoi

Best XI
Goalkeeper	(Vietnam) Nguyễn Filip (Cong An Hanoi)			
Defenders	(Vietnam) Phạm Xuân Mạnh (Hanoi FC)	(Vietnam) Nguyễn Nhật Minh (Haiphong)	(United States) Kyle Colonna (The Cong-Viettel)	(Vietnam) Cao Pendant Quang Vinh (Cong An Hanoi)
Midfielders	(Vietnam) Đỗ Hoàng Hên (Hanoi FC)		(Vietnam) Nguyễn Hoàng Đức (Ninh Binh)	(Vietnam) Nguyễn Quang Hải (Cong An Hanoi)
Forwards	(Brazil) Lucão do Break (The Cong-Viettel)		(Brazil) Alan Grafite (Cong An Hanoi)	(Vietnam) Nguyễn Đình Bắc (Cong An Hanoi)
