= 2023 V.League 1 =

67th season of the highest division of association football in Vietnam

Night Wolf V.League 1 – 2023
- Season: 2023
- Dates: 3 February – 27 August
- Champions: Cong An Hanoi; 1st VL1 title 2nd Vietnamese title
- Runner up: Hanoi FC
- Relegated: SHB Da Nang
- ASEAN Club Championship: Cong An Hanoi; Dong A Thanh Hoa
- Matches: 134
- Goals: 317 (2.37 per match)
- Top goalscorer: Rafaelson (16 goals)
- Biggest home win: Hanoi Police 5–0; Topenland Binh Dinh (3 February)
- Biggest away win: 4 matches
- Highest scoring: Dong A Thanh Hoa 5–3; Ho Chi Minh City (17 April); Ho Chi Minh City 3–5; Cong An Hanoi (21 May)
- Longest winning run: Cong An Hanoi (4 matches)
- Longest unbeaten run: Dong A Thanh Hoa (10 matches)
- Longest winless run: Becamex Binh Duong (15 matches)
- Longest losing run: 3 matches 4 teams
- Highest attendance: 18,000; Thep Xanh Nam Dinh 2–2; Hoang Anh Gia Lai (14 February)
- Lowest attendance: 2,000; 5 matches
- Total attendance: 918,200
- Average attendance: 6,852

The 2023 V.League 1, known as the Night Wolf V.League 1 (Vietnamese: Giải bóng đá Vô địch Quốc gia Night Wolf 2023) for sponsorship reasons, was the 40th season of the V.League 1, the highest division of Vietnamese football and the 23rd as a professional league. The season started on 3 February 2023.

Hanoi FC unsuccessfully defended its 2022 title. losing to Cong An Hanoi, its 2nd VL 1 title.

This season was the last to have an intra-year schedule (spring-to-autumn). There was a break from 20 February to 6 April for the 2023 AFC U-20 Asian Cup and from 18 April to 19 May for the 2023 Southeast Asian Games in Cambodia.

== Changes from previous season ==
=== Team changes ===
==== Promoted clubs ====
Promoted from 2022 V.League 2

- Cong An Nhan Dan
- Khanh Hoa

==== Relegated clubs ====
Relegated from 2022 V.League 1

- ~~Saigon~~ (withdrew)

==== Name changes ====
- Promoted side Cong An Nhan Dan FC changed their name to Cong An Hanoi in November 2022.
- Nam Dinh FC changed their name to Thep Xanh Nam Dinh on 4 January 2023 due to sponsorship reasons.

=== Rule changes ===
The league will return to the split season format as played in the 2020 season where in the latter half the top eight teams will play each other in the championship group, while the remaining six teams will face each other in the relegation group. In addition, no teams will be qualified for the AFC Champions League or AFC Cup competitions this season (all 2023–24 AFC club competition slots were already distributed in the 2022 season). Teams will also be allotted a non-naturalized Vietnamese player slot that will not be counted towards their foreign player allotment.

=== Prize money ===
1st place – 3 billion VND ($127,931) → 5 billion VND ($213,219)
2nd place – 1.5 billion VND ($63,965) → 2.5 billion VND ($106,609)
3rd place – 750 million VND ($31,982) → 1.25 billion VND ($53,304)

== Participating clubs by province ==
Locations of the 2023 V.League 1 teams

Team	Location	Stadium	Capacity	Previous season rank
Topenland Binh Dinh	Quy Nhon	Quy Nhon	15,000	VL1 (3rd)
Becamex Binh Duong	Thu Dau Mot	Go Dau	13,035	VL1 (7th)
SHB Da Nang	Da Nang	Hoa Xuan	20,000	VL1 (10th)
Hoang Anh Gia Lai	Pleiku	Pleiku	12,000	VL1 (6th)
Haiphong FC	Haiphong	Lach Tray	30,000	VL1 (2nd)
Hanoi FC	Hanoi	Hang Day	22,500	VL1 (1st)
Cong An Hanoi	Hanoi	Hang Day	22,500	VL2 (1st)
Viettel	Hanoi	Hang Day	22,500	VL1 (4th)
Hong Linh Ha Tinh	Ha Tinh	Ha Tinh	20,000	VL1 (11th)
Ho Chi Minh City FC	Ho Chi Minh City	Thong Nhat	16,000	VL1 (9th)
Khanh Hoa FC	Nha Trang	19 August	18,000	VL2 (2nd)
Thep Xanh Nam Dinh	Nam Dinh	Thien Truong	30,000	VL1 (12th)
Song Lam Nghe An	Vinh	Vinh	18,000	VL1 (5th)
Dong A Thanh Hoa	Thanh Hoa	Thanh Hoa	12,000	VL1 (8th)

=== Personnel and kits ===
Note: Flags indicate national team as has been defined under FIFA eligibility rules. Players may hold more than one non-FIFA nationality.

Team	Manager	Captain	Kit manufacturer	Shirt sponsor
Becamex Binh Duong	(Vietnam) Lê Huỳnh Đức	(Vietnam) Nguyễn Tiến Linh	(Vietnam) Kamito	(Vietnam) Becamex^{1}
Cong An Hanoi	(Vietnam) Trần Tiến Đại	(Vietnam) Huỳnh Tấn Sinh	(Vietnam) Kamito	(Vietnam) Hanoi Police Force^{1}
Dong A Thanh Hoa	(Bulgaria) Velizar Popov	(Vietnam) Nguyễn Minh Tùng	(Japan) Jogarbola	(Vietnam) Đông Á Group^{1}
Haiphong FC	(Vietnam) Chu Đình Nghiêm	(Vietnam) Nguyễn Hải Huy	(Japan) Jogarbola	
Hanoi FC	(Montenegro) Božidar Bandović	(Vietnam) Nguyễn Văn Quyết	(Japan) Jogarbola	(Vietnam) T&T Group^{1} (Vietnam) BaF Meat^{1} (Vietnam) Vinawind^{2} (Vietnam) Quảng Ninh Port^{2}
Hoang Anh Gia Lai	(Thailand) Kiatisuk Senamuang	(Vietnam) Nguyễn Tuấn Anh	(Japan) Mizuno	(Thailand) Carabao^{1}^{2} (Vietnam) Bapi Food^{2}
Ho Chi Minh City FC	(Vietnam) Vũ Tiến Thành	(Vietnam) Ngô Tùng Quốc	(Spain) Kelme	(Vietnam) Phú Mỹ Hưng^{1}^{2} (Japan) Murata^{2}
Hong Linh Ha Tinh	(Vietnam) Nguyễn Thành Công	(Vietnam) Đinh Thanh Trung	(Thailand) Grand Sport	(Vietnam) Sao Vàng Beer^{1}
Khanh Hoa FC	(Vietnam) Võ Đình Tân	(Vietnam) Lê Duy Thanh (Vietnam) Nguyễn Văn Việt	(Vietnam) Kamito	(Vietnam) KN Cam Ranh^{1}
SHB Da Nang	(Vietnam) Phạm Minh Đức	(Vietnam) Hoàng Minh Tâm	(Vietnam) Kamito	(Vietnam) SHB^{1} (Japan) Murata^{2}
Song Lam Nghe An	(Vietnam) Phan Như Thuật	(Vietnam) Quế Ngọc Hải	(Thailand) Grand Sport	(Vietnam) A An Rice^{1} (Vietnam) EuroSun^{2}
Thep Xanh Nam Dinh	(Vietnam) Vũ Hồng Việt	(Vietnam) Nguyễn Hạ Long	(Spain) Kelme	(Vietnam) Xuân Thiện Steel^{1}
Topenland Binh Dinh	(Vietnam) Nguyễn Đức Thắng	(Vietnam) Đặng Văn Lâm	(Vietnam) Kamito	(Vietnam) TopenLand^{1}
Viettel	(Vietnam) Thạch Bảo Khanh	(Vietnam) Bùi Tiến Dũng	(China) Li-Ning	(Vietnam) Viettel TV360^{1}

Notes:

1. On the front of shirt.
2. On the back of shirt.

=== Managerial changes ===
Team	Outgoing manager	Manner of departure	Date of vacancy	Position in table	Incoming manager	Date of appointment
Cong An Hanoi	(Vietnam) Thạch Bảo Khanh	Mutual consent	15 November 2022	Pre-season	(Brazil) Paulo Foiani	2 December 2022
Dong A Thanh Hoa	(Serbia) Svetislav Tanasijević (caretaker)	Caretaker period over	21 November 2022	Pre-season	(Bulgaria) Velizar Popov	2 December 2022
Hanoi FC	(South Korea) Chun Jae-ho (caretaker)	Caretaker period over	21 November 2022	Pre-season	(Montenegro) Božidar Bandović	3 January 2023
Viettel	(South Korea) Bae Ji-won	Caretaker period over	December 2022	Pre-season	(Vietnam) Thạch Bảo Khanh	15 December 2022
Becamex Binh Duong	(Vietnam) Lư Đình Tuấn	Resigned	23 February 2023	13th	(Vietnam) Nguyen Quốc Tuấn (caretaker)	23 February 2023
Cong An Hanoi	(Brazil) Paulo Foiani	Mutual consent	27 April 2023	5th	(Brazil) Flavio Cruz	9 May 2023
Becamex Binh Duong	(Vietnam) Nguyễn Quốc Tuấn	Caretaker period over	11 May 2023	14th	(Vietnam) Lê Huỳnh Đức	11 May 2023
SHB Da Nang	(Vietnam) Phan Thanh Hùng	Promoted to technical director	3 June 2023	14th	(Vietnam) Phạm Minh Đức	3 June 2023
Song Lam Nghe An	(Vietnam) Nguyễn Huy Hoàng	Resigned	3 June 2023	11th	(Vietnam) Phan Như Thuật	3 June 2023
Cong An Hanoi	(Brazil) Flavio Cruz	Mutual consent	22 August 2023	1st	(Vietnam) Trần Tiến Đại	22 August 2023

== Foreign players ==
Teams are allowed to register 3 foreign players. Starting this season, teams will be allotted an extra slot for 1 unnaturalized overseas Vietnamese player that will not be counted against their foreign player allotment. Hanoi and Haiphong will be allowed to register 1 additional AFC player as they will compete in the AFC competitions.

- Players name in **bold** indicates the player was registered after the start of the season.

Club	Player 1	Player 2	Player 3	Player 4 (Unnaturalized Vietnamese player)	Player 5 (AFC player, AFC competitions)	Former Players
Topenland Binh Dinh	(Brazil) Rafaelson	(Brazil) Marlon Rangel	(Jamaica) Jermie Lynch	(Russia) Viktor Le		(Nigeria) Ganiyu Oseni
Becamex Binh Duong	(Jamaica) Rimario Gordon	(Brazil) **Cassius**	(Australia) **Nicholas Olsen**			(Brazil) João Guilherme (Senegal) Guy N’Diaye (Uganda) Moses Oloya
SHB Da Nang	(Brazil) Mauricio Pinto	(Brazil) **Lucão**	(Australia) **Brandon Wilson**			(Brazil) Aylton Alemão (Brazil) Rodrigo Dias (Australia) Nicholas Olsen
Hoang Anh Gia Lai	(Brazil) Washington Brandão	(Senegal) Papé Diakité	(Brazil) Paollo			
Haiphong	(Haiti) Bicou Bissainthe	(Uganda) Joseph Mpande	(Brazil) **Yuri Mamute**	(Germany) Nguyen Nhu Duc Anh	(Australia) **Benjamin Van Meurs**	(Spain) Carlos Fernandez
Hanoi FC	(Serbia) **Milan Jevtović**	(Brazil) **Caion**	(Brazil) Marcão		(Kyrgyzstan) **Mirlan Murzayev**	(Brazil) William Henrique (Brazil) Lucão
Cong An Hanoi	(Brazil) Gustavo Henrique	(Brazil) Jhon Cley	(Nigeria) **Raphael Success**	(Czech Republic) **Filip Nguyen**		(Republic of the Congo) Juvhel Tsoumou (Portugal) Elton Monteiro (Slovakia) Patrik Le Giang
Viettel	(Egypt) **Mohamed Essam**	(Brazil) Jeferson Elias	(Uzbekistan) Jahongir Abdumominov			(Brazil) Geovane
Hong Linh Ha Tinh	(Brazil) Janclesio	(Brazil) Zé Paulo	(Senegal) Abdoulaye Diallo	(Slovakia) Pham Thanh Tiep		
Ho Chi Minh City	(Jamaica) Daniel Green	(Brazil) **Brendon Lucas**	(United States) Victor Mansaray	(Slovakia) **Patrik Le Giang**		(England) Alex Bruce (United States) Jonny Campbell (United States) Lê Trung Vinh (France) Vincent Trọng Trí Guyenne
Khanh Hoa	(Brazil) **Douglas Tardin**	(Brazil) Jairo	(Brazil) Yago Ramos	(France) Ryan Ha		(Brazil) Douglas Mineiro (Portugal) Muacir
Thep Xanh Nam Dinh	(Brazil) Hêndrio	(Brazil) **Douglas Coutinho**	(Brazil) **André Luiz**			(Brazil) Wilker (Brazil) Dominic Vinicius (Nigeria) Samuel Nnamani
Song Lam Nghe An	(Nigeria) Michael Olaha	(Lithuania) Vytas Gašpuitis	(Belgium) Jordy Soladio			
Dong A Thanh Hoa	(Brazil) Conrado	(Brazil) Gustavo	(Brazil) Bruno Cantanhede			

=== Dual nationality players ===
- Players name in **bold** indicates the player was registered after the start of the season.
- Player's name in italics indicates Overseas Vietnamese players whom have obtained a Vietnamese passport and citizenship, therefore being considered as local players.

Club	Player 1	Player 2	Player 3
Topenland Binh Dinh	(Czech Republic) (Vietnam) Mạc Hồng Quân^{2}	(Germany) (Vietnam) Adriano Schmidt^{2}	(Russia) (Vietnam) Đặng Văn Lâm^{2}
Becamex Binh Duong	(France) (Vietnam) A Sân	(Uganda) (Vietnam) Trần Trung Hiếu	(United States) (Vietnam) Đặng Thanh Hoàng
SHB Da Nang			
Hoang Anh Gia Lai			
Haiphong	(Australia) (Vietnam) Lò Martin		
Hanoi FC			
Cong An Hanoi			
Viettel			
Hong Linh Ha Tinh			
Ho Chi Minh CIty	(Nigeria) (Vietnam) Hoàng Vũ Samson		
Khanh Hoa			
Thep Xanh Nam Dinh			
Song Lam Nghe An			
Dong A Thanh Hoa			

Notes:

^2 Capped for Vietnam national team.

== Regular season ==
=== League table ===
Pos	Team	Pld	W	D	L	GF	GA	GD	Pts	Promotion or relegation
1	Cong An Hanoi	13	7	3	3	29	15	+14	24	Qualification to Championship round
2	Dong A Thanh Hoa	13	6	5	2	20	15	+5	23	Qualification to Championship round
3	Hanoi FC	13	6	4	3	18	12	+6	22	Qualification to Championship round
4	Viettel	13	5	6	2	14	11	+3	21	Qualification to Championship round
5	Haiphong FC	13	4	7	2	14	13	+1	19	Qualification to Championship round
6	Topenland Binh Dinh	13	5	4	4	17	17	0	19	Qualification to Championship round
7	Thep Xanh Nam Dinh	13	4	7	2	12	13	−1	19	Qualification to Championship round
8	Hong Linh Ha Tinh	13	4	6	3	20	20	0	18	Qualification to Championship round
9	Song Lam Nghe An	13	3	7	3	14	15	−1	16	Qualification to Relegation round
10	Hoang Anh Gia Lai	13	2	8	3	15	16	−1	14	Qualification to Relegation round
11	Khanh Hoa FC	13	2	7	4	11	14	−3	13	Qualification to Relegation round
12	SHB Da Nang	13	1	7	5	8	15	−7	10	Qualification to Relegation round
13	Ho Chi Minh City FC	13	2	2	9	19	27	−8	8	Qualification to Relegation round
14	Becamex Binh Duong	13	0	7	6	13	21	−8	7	Qualification to Relegation round

Updated to match(es) played on 17 April 2023. Source: VPF
Rules for classification: 1) Points; 2) Goal difference; 3) Goals scored; 4) Disciplinary points; 5) Play-off (Only to decide champions, runners-up, third placed and relegation spots); 6) Drawing of lots

=== Position by round ===
Team ╲ Round	1	2	3	4	5	6	7	8	9	10	11	12	13
Dong A Thanh Hoa	2	4	3	3	2	2	1	1	1	1	1	2	2
Cong An Hanoi	1	5	7	8	9	5	5	3	2	2	2	1	1
Hanoi FC	8	2	1	2	1	1	2	2	3	3	3	3	3
Hong Linh Ha Tinh	11	11	12	7	7	10	6	7	6	6	4	5	8
Viettel	9	10	6	5	8	7	10	6	8	7	5	4	4
Haiphong FC	5	3	5	6	6	9	11	11	7	9	6	6	5
Topenland Binh Dinh	14	6	4	1	4	4	3	4	4	4	7	7	6
Thep Xanh Nam Dinh	3	1	2	4	3	3	4	5	5	5	8	8	7
Hoang Anh Gia Lai	10	8	8	9	5	6	8	9	9	8	9	9	10
Khanh Hoa FC	12	14	10	11	11	8	7	8	10	10	10	11	11
Song Lam Nghe An	7	9	9	10	10	11	9	10	11	11	11	10	9
Becamex Binh Duong	4	7	11	13	12	13	14	13	13	13	12	13	14
Ho Chi Minh City FC	13	13	14	12	13	12	12	14	14	12	13	12	13
SHB Da Nang	6	12	13	14	14	14	13	12	12	14	14	14	12

Championship Round
Relegation Round

Source: VPF

=== Results ===
Home \ Away	BBD	DTH	HPG	HAN	HNP	HGL	HCM	HHT	KHA	SDN	SNA	TND	TBD	VTL
Becamex Binh Duong	—	1–1	—	1–1	1–2	1–1	1–2	—	—	—	—	2–3	—	—
Dong A Thanh Hoa	—	—	0–1	—	1–4	—	5–3	4–1	—	1–0	0–0	—	—	3–2
Haiphong	2–2	—	—	—	—	2–0	—	2–3	2–1	0–0	—	—	—	0–0
Hanoi FC	—	0–0	3–0	—	2–0	—	—	—	—	1–1	0–1	1–0	—	—
Cong An Hanoi	—	—	1–1	—	—	—	—	4–2	0–0	—	2–1	4–0	5–0	1–2
Hoang Anh Gia Lai	—	2–2	—	1–0	1–1	—	0–0	0–0	1–1	—	—	—	—	—
Ho Chi Minh City	—	—	0–1	1–3	3–5	—	—	—	0–2	5–1	—	—	1–1	0–1
Hong Linh Ha Tinh	3–0	—	—	2–3	—	—	4–3	—	0–0	0–0	—	—	2–1	0–0
Khanh Hoa	1–1	1–2	—	1–2	—	—	—	—	—	1–0	2–2	—	—	0–0
SHB Da Nang	1–1	—	—	—	1–0	1–1	—	—	—	—	—	0–1	2–3	0–0
Song Lam Nghe An	1–1	—	1–1	—	—	3–1	2–1	2–2	—	1–1	—	—	0–0	—
Thep Xanh Nam Dinh	—	0–0	1–1	—	—	2–2	1–0	1–1	1–1	—	1–0	—	—	—
Topenland Binh Dinh	1–0	0–1	1–1	3–1	—	2–1	—	—	3–0	—	—	1–1	—	—
Viettel	2–1	—	—	1–1	—	1–4	—	—	—	—	3–0	0–0	2–1	—

Updated to match(es) played on 3 July 2023. Source: VPF
Legend: Blue = home team win; Yellow = draw; Red = away team win.

== Championship round ==
Points and goals carried over in full from the regular season.

Pos	Team	Pld	W	D	L	GF	GA	GD	Pts	Qualification	HNP	HAN	VTL	DTH	TND	HPG	TBD	HHT
1	Cong An Hanoi (C)	20	11	5	4	39	21	+18	38	Qualification for the ASEAN Club Championship	—	2–1		1–1		0–2		1–1
2	Hanoi FC	20	11	5	4	35	22	+13	38			—	2–1		1–0	3–1	4–2	
3	Viettel	20	8	8	4	23	17	+6	32		0–3		—			2–0	0–0	4–0
4	Dong A Thanh Hoa	20	8	7	5	27	22	+5	31	Qualification to the ASEAN Club Championship (Note: Dong A Thanh Hoa qualified for the ASEAN Club Championship group stage as the 2023 Vietnamese Cup winners.)		1–3	0–1	—	0–2		2–0	
5	Thep Xanh Nam Dinh	20	7	8	5	19	19	0	29		1–2		0–0		—			2–0
6	Haiphong FC	20	6	8	6	20	23	−3	26					0–3	2–0	—	1–2	
7	Topenland Binh Dinh	20	6	6	8	23	28	−5	24		0–1				1–2		—	1–1
8	Hong Linh Ha Tinh	20	4	11	5	24	30	−6	23			2–2		0–0		0–0		—

Updated to match(es) played on 10 August 2023. Source: VPF
Legend: Blue = home team win; Yellow = draw; Red = away team win.
Rules for classification: 1) Points; 2) Goal difference; 3) Goals scored; 4) Disciplinary points; 5) Play-off (Only to decide champions, runners-up, third placed and relegation spots); 6) Drawing of lots
(C) Champions

=== Positions by round ===
Below the positions per round are shown. As teams did not all start with an equal number of points, the initial pre-playoffs positions are also given.

Team ╲ Round	14	15	16	17	18	19	20
Cong An Hanoi	1	1	3	2	1	1	1
Hanoi FC	2	2	1	1	2	2	2
Viettel	3	4	4	4	3	3	3
Dong A Thanh Hoa	4	3	2	3	4	4	4
Thep Xanh Nam Dinh	5	5	5	5	6	6	5
Haiphong	7	8	6	6	5	5	6
Topenland Binh Dinh	8	7	8	8	8	8	7
Hong Linh Ha Tinh	6	6	7	7	7	7	8

Champion and qualification to the 2024–25 ASEAN Club Championship

Source: VPF

== Relegation round ==
Points and goals carried over in full from the regular season.

Pos	Team	Pld	W	D	L	GF	GA	GD	Pts	Relegation	SNA	HGL	KHA	BBD	HCM	SDN
9	Song Lam Nghe An	18	6	7	5	19	20	−1	25		—	1–0		0–2	2–0	
10	Hoang Anh Gia Lai	18	5	8	5	19	19	0	23			—	1–0		0–1	1–0
11	Khanh Hoa	18	4	7	7	18	22	−4	19		3–1		—		3–0	1–3
12	Becamex Binh Duong	18	2	9	7	19	23	−4	15			0–1	3–0	—		
13	Ho Chi Minh City	18	4	3	11	21	32	−11	15					0–0	—	1–0
14	SHB Da Nang (R)	18	2	8	8	11	19	−8	14	Relegation to V.League 2	0–1			0–0		—

Source: VPF
Legend: Blue = home team win; Yellow = draw; Red = away team win.
Rules for classification: 1) Points; 2) Head-to-head points 3) Goal difference; 4) Goals scored; 5) Disciplinary points; 6) Play-off (Only to decide champions, runners-up, third placed and relegation spots); 7) Drawing of lots
(R) Relegated

=== Positions by round ===
Below the positions per round are shown. As teams did not all start with an equal number of points, the initial pre-playoffs positions are also given.

Team ╲ Round	14	15	16	17	18
Song Lam Nghe An	9	10	11	10	9
Hoang Anh Gia Lai	10	9	9	9	10
Khanh Hoa	11	11	10	11	11
Becamex Binh Duong	13	14	12	12	12
Ho Chi Minh City	14	13	14	13	13
SHB Da Nang	12	12	13	14	14

Source: VPF

== Season statistics ==
=== Top scorers ===
Rank	Player	Club	Goals
1	(Brazil) Rafaelson	Topenland Binh Dinh	14
2	(Brazil) Jhon Cley	Cong An Hanoi	11
2	(Brazil) Bruno Cantanhede	Dong A Thanh Hoa	11
4	(United States) Victor Mansaray	Ho Chi Minh City	9
4	(Vietnam) Hoàng Vũ Samson	Ho Chi Minh City	9
6	(Senegal) Abdoulaye Diallo	Hong Linh Ha Tinh	8
6	(Brazil) Caion	Hanoi FC	8
6	(Vietnam) Nguyễn Văn Quyết	Hanoi FC	8
9	(Jamaica) Rimario Gordon	Becamex Binh Duong	6
9	(Vietnam) Nguyễn Đức Chiến	Viettel	6
9	(Brazil) Paollo	Hoang Anh Gia Lai	6

Source: Soccerway

=== Hat-tricks ===
Player	For	Against	Result	Date
(Republic of the Congo) Juvhel Tsoumou	Hanoi Police	Topenland Binh Dinh	5–0 (H)	3 February 2023
(Brazil) Rafaelson	Topenland Binh Dinh	Hanoi FC	3–1 (H)	17 April 2023
(Brazil) Jhon Cley	Cong An Hanoi	Hong Linh Ha Tinh	4–2 (H)	24 June 2023
(Brazil) Caion	Hanoi FC	Topenland Binh Dinh	4–2 (H)	17 July 2023
(Brazil) Lucão do Break	SHB Da Nang	Khanh Hoa	3–1 (A)	11 August 2023
(Brazil) Caion	Hanoi FC	Dong A Thanh Hoa	3–1 (A)	12 August 2023

=== Clean sheets ===
Rank	Player	Club	Matches
1	(Vietnam) Nguyễn Thanh Diệp	Dong A Thanh Hoa	4
1	(Vietnam) Dương Quang Tuấn	Hong Linh Ha Tinh	4
1	(Vietnam) Trần Nguyên Mạnh	Thep Xanh Nam Dinh	4
1	(Vietnam) Phạm Văn Phong	Viettel	4
5	(Vietnam) Bùi Tấn Trường	Hanoi FC	3
6	(Vietnam) Lê Văn Trường	Khanh Hoa	2
6	(Vietnam) Phạm Văn Cường	SHB Da Nang	2
6	(Vietnam) Đặng Văn Lâm	Topenland Binh Dinh	2
9	(Vietnam) Bùi Tiến Dũng	Cong An Hanoi	1
9	(Slovakia) Patrik Le Giang	Cong An Hanoi	1
9	(Vietnam) Nguyễn Văn Toản	Haiphong	1
9	(Vietnam) Nguyễn Đình Triệu	Haiphong	1
9	(Vietnam) Huỳnh Tuấn Linh	Hoang Anh Gia Lai	1
9	(Vietnam) Nguyễn Thanh Tùng	Hong Linh Ha Tinh	1
9	(Vietnam) Võ Ngọc Cường	Khanh Hoa	1
9	(Vietnam) Trần Văn Tiến	Song Lam Nghe An	1

=== Discipline ===
==== Player ====
- Most yellow cards: 6
  - 3 players
- Most red cards: 1
  - 12 players

==== Club ====
- Most yellow cards: 28
  - Dong A Thanh Hoa
- Fewest yellow cards: 12
  - Song Lam Nghe An
- Most red cards: 2
  - Topenland Binh Dinh
  - Hoang Anh Gia Lai
- Fewest red cards: 0
  - 4 clubs

== Attendances ==
=== By round ===
2023 V.League Attendance
Round	Total	GP.	Avg. Per Game
Round 1	58,000	7	8,286
Round 2	43,000	7	6,142
Round 3	51,000	7	7,286
Round 4	48,000	7	6,857
Round 5	38,000	7	5,429
Round 6	47,500	7	6,786
Round 7	44,000	7	6,286
Round 8	46,500	7	6,643
Round 9	45,500	7	6,500
Round 10	43,700	7	6,243
Round 11	56,000	7	8,000
Total	521,200	77	6,769

=== By team ===
Pos	Team	Total	High	Low	Average	Change
1	Thep Xanh Nam Dinh	135,000	18,000	10,000	13,500	+22.7%
2	Cong An Hanoi	112,000	14,000	5,000	10,182	+583.4%^{†}
3	SHB Da Nang	66,500	16,000	4,500	8,313	+72.6%
4	Hanoi FC	74,500	14,000	4,500	7,450	−11.9%
5	Hoang Anh Gia Lai	65,500	11,000	5,000	7,278	+4.0%
6	Dong A Thanh Hoa	78,000	10,000	5,000	7,091	+39.5%
7	Haiphong	60,500	13,000	5,000	6,722	−30.6%
8	Khanh Hoa	54,500	8,000	5,000	6,055	+100.6%^{†}
9	Becamex Binh Duong	42,000	8,000	3,500	5,250	+0.5%
10	Viettel	51,700	14,000	2,000	5,170	+14.9%
11	Hong Linh Ha Tinh	49,000	7,000	3,000	4,900	−5.9%
12	Topenland Binh Dinh	46,500	7,500	2,000	4,650	−44.2%
13	Song Lam Nghe An	44,900	6,500	2,000	4,490	−30.0%
14	Ho Chi Minh City	37,000	5,000	3,000	4,111	+5.0%
	League total	900,500	18,000	2,000	6,532	+2.0%

Source: League attendance
Notes:
^{†} Teams played previous season in V.League 2

== Awards ==
=== Monthly awards ===
Month	Manager of the Month		Player of the Month		Goal of the Month	
Month	Manager	Club	Player	Club	Player	Club
February	(Vietnam) Nguyễn Đức Thắng	Topenland Binh Dinh	(Vietnam) Nguyễn Văn Quyết	Hanoi FC	(Vietnam) Trần Phi Sơn	Hong Linh Ha Tinh
April	(Bulgaria) Velizar Popov	Dong A Thanh Hoa	(Brazil) Paulo Conrado	Dong A Thanh Hoa	(Vietnam) Nguyễn Trọng Long	Cong An Hanoi
June	(Vietnam) Chu Đình Nghiêm	Haiphong	(Brazil) Jhon Cley	Cong An Hanoi	(Vietnam) Hoàng Vũ Samson	Ho Chi Minh City
August	(Vietnam) Thạch Bảo Khanh	Viettel	(Vietnam) Nguyễn Hoàng Đức	Viettel	(Vietnam) Trần Phi Sơn	Hong Linh Ha Tinh

=== Annual awards ===
Award	Winner	Club
Manager of the Year	(Montenegro) Božidar Bandović	Hanoi FC
Player of the Year	(Vietnam) Nguyễn Hoàng Đức	Viettel
Best Young Player	(Vietnam) Nguyễn Thái Sơn	Dong A Thanh Hoa
Goal of the Year	(Vietnam) Trần Phi Sơn	Hong Linh Ha Tinh

Best XI
Goalkeeper	(Vietnam) Trần Nguyên Mạnh (Thep Xanh Nam Dinh)			
Defenders	(Vietnam) Vũ Văn Thanh (Cong An Hanoi)	(Vietnam) Bùi Hoàng Việt Anh (Hanoi FC)	(Vietnam) Nguyễn Thanh Bình (Viettel)	(Vietnam) Đoàn Văn Hậu (Cong An Hanoi)
Midfielders	(Vietnam) Lâm Ti Phông (Dong A Thanh Hoa)	(Vietnam) Nguyễn Hoàng Đức (Viettel)	(Vietnam) Nguyễn Hải Huy (Haiphong)	(Vietnam) Bùi Văn Đức (Hong Linh Ha Tinh)
Forwards	(Brazil) Rafaelson (Topenland Binh Dinh)		(Vietnam) Phạm Tuấn Hải (Hanoi FC)	
