= 2023–24 V.League 1 =

68th season of the highest division of association football in Vietnam

Night Wolf V.League 1 2023–24
- Season: 2023–24
- Dates: 20 October 2023 – 30 June 2024
- Champions: Thep Xanh Nam Dinh; 1st VL1 title 2nd Vietnamese title
- Relegated: Khanh Hoa
- AFC Champions League Two: Thep Xanh Nam Dinh
- Matches: 182
- Goals: 491 (2.7 per match)
- Top goalscorer: Rafaelson (31 goals)
- Biggest home win: Cong An Hanoi 5–0 LPBank HAGL (25 June 2024)
- Biggest away win: Khanh Hoa 0–5 Quang Nam (15 June 2024); Dong A Thanh Hoa 0–5 The Cong-Viettel (15 June 2024)
- Highest scoring: Hanoi FC 3–5 Haiphong (29 October 2023); Song Lam Nghe An 4–4 Quang Nam (2 December 2023)
- Longest winning run: Hanoi FC (5 matches)
- Longest unbeaten run: Haiphong (11 matches)
- Longest winless run: Khanh Hoa (19 matches)
- Longest losing run: Khanh Hoa (9 matches)
- Highest attendance: 25,000; Thep Xanh Nam Dinh 5–1 Khanh Hoa (25 June 2024)
- Lowest attendance: 800; Khanh Hoa 0–5 Quang Nam (15 June 2024)
- Total attendance: 1,072,000
- Average attendance: 5,890
- All statistics correct as of 30 June 2024.

The 2023–24 V.League 1, known as the 2023–24 Night Wolf V.League 1 (Vietnamese: Giải bóng đá Vô địch Quốc gia Night Wolf 2023–24) for sponsorship reasons, was the 41st season of the V.League 1, the highest division of Vietnamese football and the 24th as a professional league. The season was scheduled to commence on 20 October 2023 and ends on 30 June 2024.

Cong An Hanoi was the defending champions.

This season was the first since the 2001–02 season to have an inter-year schedule (autumn-to-spring) instead of an intra-year schedule (spring-to-autumn) to follow the schedule changes in the AFC competitions. There was also a break from 25 December 2023 to 10 February 2024 for the 2023 AFC Asian Cup and from 7 April 2024 to 3 May 2024 for the 2024 AFC U-23 Asian Cup.

This was the first season that the league officially applies video assistant referee (VAR) technology, but will only apply to matches taking place in the north of the country. Like the previous season, teams was allotted a non-naturalized Vietnamese player slot that will not be counted towards their foreign player allotment.

== Teams ==
A total of 14 teams will participate in the 2023 edition of the V.League 1.

=== Changes from previous season ===
Promoted from 2023 V.League 2	Relegated to 2023–24 V.League 2
Quang Nam	SHB Da Nang

14 teams are going to compete in this season. The relegated team is SHB Da Nang, who have spent 21 years in the top flight ever since their promotion in 2002. They are also the winner of the 2009 and 2012 seasons. The promoted teams is Quang Nam FC, who have come back to the top flight after 3 seasons.

=== Name changes ===
- On 22 September 2023, Topenland Binh Dinh FC changed their name to Quy Nhon Binh Dinh FC.
- On 2 November 2023, Hoang Anh Gia Lai FC changed their name to LPBank-Hoang Anh Gia Lai FC but the league didn't allow team name change in course of the season. However, the league reverted the decision and allowed the name change on 22 November 2023.
- On 22 November 2023, Viettel FC changed their name to The Cong - Viettel FC.
- On 1 December 2023, Quy Nhon Binh Dinh FC changed their name to MerryLand Quy Nhon Binh Dinh FC.

=== Prize money ===
1st Place - 5 billion VND ($205,150)
2nd Place - 3 billion VND ($123,090)
3rd Place - 1.5 billion VND ($61,545).

=== Stadiums and locations ===
Locations of the 2023–24 V.League 1 teams

Team	Location	Stadium	Capacity	Previous season rank
MerryLand Quy Nhon Binh Dinh	Binh Dinh	Quy Nhon	15,000	VL1 (7th)
Becamex Binh Duong	Binh Duong	Go Dau	13,035	VL1 (12th)
LPBank Hoang Anh Gia Lai	Gia Lai	Pleiku	12,000	VL1 (10th)
Haiphong FC	Haiphong	Lach Tray	30,000	VL1 (6th)
Hanoi FC	Hanoi	Hang Day	22,500	VL1 (2nd)
Cong An Hanoi	Hanoi	Hang Day	22,500	VL1 (1st)
The Cong-Viettel	Hanoi	Hang Day	22,500	VL1 (3rd)
Hong Linh Ha Tinh	Ha Tinh	Ha Tinh	20,000	VL1 (8th)
Ho Chi Minh City FC	Ho Chi Minh City	Thong Nhat	16,000	VL1 (13th)
Khanh Hoa FC	Khanh Hoa	19 August	18,000	VL1 (11th)
Thep Xanh Nam Dinh	Nam Dinh	Thien Truong	30,000	VL1 (5th)
Song Lam Nghe An	Nghe An	Vinh	18,000	VL1 (9th)
Quang Nam	Quang Nam	Hoa Xuan	20,500	VL2 (1st)
Dong A Thanh Hoa	Thanh Hoa	Thanh Hoa	12,000	VL1 (4th)

Notes

1. QNA: Quang Nam's home stadium Tam Ky was under renovations during the entire 2023–24 season. As the result, the club confirmed the Hoa Xuan Stadium in neighboring Da Nang as its home stadium.

=== Number of teams by region ===
Number	Region	Team(s)
5	Red River Delta	Haiphong, Hanoi FC, Cong An Hanoi, Thep Xanh Nam Dinh and The Cong-Viettel
3	North Central	Dong A Thanh Hoa, Hong Linh Ha Tinh, and Song Lam Nghe An
3	South Central	Khanh Hoa, Quang Nam and MerryLand Quy Nhon Binh Dinh
2	Southeast	Becamex Binh Duong and Ho Chi Minh City
1	Central Highlands	LPBank Hoang Anh Gia Lai

== Personnel and kits ==
Note: Flags indicate national team as has been defined under FIFA eligibility rules. Players may hold more than one non-FIFA nationality.

Team	Manager	Captain	Kit manufacturer	Shirt sponsor
Becamex Binh Duong	(Vietnam) Nguyễn Đức Cảnh	(Vietnam) Nguyễn Tiến Linh	(Vietnam) Kamito	(Vietnam) Becamex^{1}
Dong A Thanh Hoa	(Bulgaria) Velizar Popov	(Vietnam) Nguyễn Thái Sơn	(Japan) Jogarbola	(Thailand) Casper Electric^{1}
Haiphong	(Vietnam) Chu Đình Nghiêm	(Uganda) Joseph Mpande	(Japan) Jogarbola	
Hanoi FC	(Japan) Daiki Iwamasa	(Vietnam) Nguyễn Văn Quyết	(Japan) Jogarbola	(Vietnam) Kita Group^{1} (Vietnam) Vinawind^{2} (Vietnam) Quảng Ninh Port^{2} (Vietnam) SHS^{2}
Cong An Hanoi	(Brazil) Alexandré Pölking	(Vietnam) Hồ Tấn Tài	(Vietnam) Kamito	(Vietnam) Hanoi Police Force^{1}
LPBank Hoang Anh Gia Lai	(Vietnam) Vũ Tiến Thành	(Vietnam) Trần Minh Vương	(Vietnam) Kamito	(Thailand) Carabao^{1} (Vietnam) LPBank^{2}
Ho Chi Minh City	(Vietnam) Phùng Thanh Phương	(Vietnam) Ngô Tùng Quốc	(Japan) Jogarbola	(England) Mansion Sports^{1} (Vietnam) Phú Hưng Life Insurance^{1} (Vietnam) Phú Hưng Securities^{2}
Hong Linh Ha Tinh	(Vietnam) Nguyễn Thành Công	(Vietnam) Trần Phi Sơn	(Thailand) Grand Sport	(Vietnam) Sao Vàng Beer^{1}
Khanh Hoa	(Vietnam) Trần Trọng Bình	(Vietnam) Lê Duy Thanh	(Vietnam) Kamito	(Vietnam) Yến Sào Khánh Hòa (H)^{1} (Vietnam) Sanvinest (A)^{1} (Vietnam) Sanest (3rd)^{1} (Vietnam) KN Cam Ranh^{2}
Quang Nam	(Vietnam) Văn Sỹ Sơn	(Vietnam) Ngân Văn Đại	(Spain) Kelme	
MerryLand Quy Nhon Binh Dinh	(Vietnam) Bùi Đoàn Quang Huy	(Vietnam) Đặng Văn Lâm	(Vietnam) Kamito	(Vietnam) MerryLand Quy Nhon^{1}
Song Lam Nghe An	(Vietnam) Phạm Anh Tuấn	(Nigeria) Michael Olaha	(Thailand) Grand Sport	(Vietnam) A An Rice^{1} (Vietnam) EuroSun^{2} (Japan) Nikkokutrust^{2}
Thep Xanh Nam Dinh	(Vietnam) Vũ Hồng Việt	(Vietnam) Trần Nguyên Mạnh	(England) Mitre	(Vietnam) Xuân Thiện Steel^{1}
The Cong-Viettel	(Vietnam) Nguyễn Đức Thắng	(Vietnam) Bùi Tiến Dũng	(China) Li-Ning	(Vietnam) Viettel^{1} (Vietnam) TV360^{2}

Notes:

1. On the front of shirt.
2. On the back of shirt.

=== Managerial changes ===
Team	Outgoing manager	Manner of departure	Date of vacancy	Position in table	Incoming manager	Date of appointment
MerryLand Quy Nhon Binh Dinh	(Vietnam) Nguyễn Đức Thắng	Mutual consent	28 August 2023	Pre-season	(Vietnam) Bùi Đoàn Quang Huy	28 August 2023
Hanoi FC	(Montenegro) Božidar Bandović	Sacked	7 October 2023	Pre-season	(Vietnam) Lê Đức Tuấn (interim)	7 October 2023
Hanoi FC	(Vietnam) Lê Đức Tuấn (interim)	Demoted to assistant manager	30 October 2023	13th	(Vietnam) Đinh Thế Nam (interim)	30 October 2023
Cong An Hanoi	(Vietnam) Trần Tiến Đại	Appointed as technical director	12 November 2023	2nd	(South Korea) Gong Oh-kyun	12 November 2023
Ho Chi Minh City	(Vietnam) Vũ Tiến Thành	Resigned	21 November 2023	7th	(Vietnam) Phùng Thanh Phương	24 November 2023
Khanh Hoa	(Vietnam) Võ Đình Tân	Resigned	12 December 2023	12th	(Vietnam) Trần Thiện Hảo (interim)	14 December 2023
The Cong-Viettel	(Vietnam) Thạch Bảo Khanh	Appointed as technical director	18 December 2023	9th	(United States) Thomas Dooley	18 December 2023
Khanh Hoa	(Vietnam) Trần Thiện Hảo (interim)	Interim period ended	20 December 2023	12th	(Vietnam) Trần Trọng Bình	20 December 2023
The Cong-Viettel	(United States) Thomas Dooley	Appointed as technical director	8 January 2024	11th	(Vietnam) Nguyễn Đức Thắng	8 January 2024
Hanoi FC	(Vietnam) Đinh Thế Nam (interim)	Interim period ended	10 January 2024	8th	(Japan) Daiki Iwamasa	11 January 2024
LPBank Hoang Anh Gia Lai	(Thailand) Kiatisuk Senamuang	Manager loaned out	13 January 2024	14th	(Vietnam) Vũ Tiến Thành	16 January 2024
Cong An Hanoi	(South Korea) Gong Oh-kyun	Demoted to the youth team	16 January 2024	5th	(Thailand) Kiatisuk Senamuang	16 January 2024
Song Lam Nghe An	(Vietnam) Phan Như Thuật	Appointed as assistant manager	11 May 2024	13th	(Vietnam) Phạm Anh Tuấn	11 May 2024
Cong An Hanoi	(Thailand) Kiatisuk Senamuang	Resigned	14 May 2024	2nd	(Vietnam) Trần Tiến Đại (interim)	14 May 2024
Cong An Hanoi	(Vietnam) Trần Tiến Đại (interim)	Interim period ended	27 May 2024	6th	(Brazil) Alexandré Pölking	27 May 2024
Becamex Binh Duong	(Vietnam) Lê Huỳnh Đức	Resigned	18 June 2024	8th	(Vietnam) Nguyễn Đức Cảnh (interim)	18 June 2024

== Foreign players ==
Teams are allowed to register 3 foreign players. Starting from the previous season, teams will be allotted an extra slot for 1 unnaturalized overseas Vietnamese player that will not be counted against their foreign player allotment. Hanoi and Haiphong will be allowed to register 1 additional foreign players as they will compete in the AFC competitions. Therefore they are only allowed to field maximum 3 foreign players during a league game. Players name in bold indicates the player was registered after the start of the season.

Club	Player 1	Player 2	Player 3	Player 4 (Unnaturalized Vietnamese player)	Player 5 (AFC competitions)	Unregistred / Former players
Becamex Binh Duong	(Brazil) Janclesio	(Nigeria) **Charles Atshimene**	(Nigeria) **Joseph Onoja**	(United States) **Cyrus Tran**		(Cameroon) Arsène Elogo (Republic of the Congo) Prince Ibara (France) Ryan Ha
Dong A Thanh Hoa	(Australia) **Benjamin Van Meurs**	(Brazil) Luiz Antônio	(Jamaica) Rimario Gordon			(Brazil) Gustavo
Haiphong	(Brazil) Lucão	(Cameroon) **Arsène Elogo**	(Haiti) Bicou Bissainthe		(Uganda) Joseph Mpande	(Australia) Benjamin Van Meurs (Brazil) Yuri Mamute
Hanoi FC	(Brazil) Denílson	(Brazil) **Ewerton**	(Cameroon) Joel Tagueu	(France) **Ryan Ha**	(Luxembourg) **Tim Hall**	(Australia) Brandon Wilson (Brazil) Caion (Brazil) Marcão (France) Damien Le Tallec (Serbia) Milan Jevtović
Cong An Hanoi	(Brazil) Geovane	(Brazil) Jeferson Elías	(Brazil) Júnior Fialho			(Nigeria) Raphael Success
LPBank Hoang Anh Gia Lai	(Brazil) **Gabriel Ferreira**	(Brazil) Jairo	(Brazil) **João Veras**			(Brazil) Jhon Cley (Ghana) Martin Dzilah (Senegal) Papé Diakité
Ho Chi Minh City	(Brazil) Brendon Lucas	(Colombia) **Santiago Patiño**	(Ivory Coast) Cheick Timité	(Slovakia) Patrik Le Giang		(Brazil) Wander Luiz (Cameroon) Paul-Georges Ntep
Hong Linh Ha Tinh	(Brazil) Bruno Ramires	(Republic of the Congo) **Prince Ibara**	(Senegal) Abdoulaye Diallo	(Russia) **Viktor Le**		(Nigeria) Stephen Gopey
Khanh Hoa	**(Brazil) Douglas Coutinho**	(Haiti) Watz Leazard	(Sierra Leone) Alie Sesay			(Denmark) Truong Quoc Minh (Guinea) Mamadou Guirassy
Quang Nam	(Brazil) Conrado	(Brazil) Yago Ramos	(Nigeria) Stephen Eze	**(Denmark) Truong Quoc Minh**		(Canada) Pierre Lamothe
Quy Nhon Binh Dinh	(Brazil) Alan Grafite	(Brazil) Léo Artur	(Brazil) Marlon Rangel			(Guinea-Bissau) João Mário (Russia) Viktor Le
Song Lam Nghe An	(Croatia) Mario Zebić	(Nigeria) Michael Olaha	(Nigeria) Raphael Success			
Thep Xanh Nam Dinh	(Brazil) Hêndrio	(Brazil) **Lucas Alves**	(Brazil) Rafaelson			(Brazil) Douglas Coutinho
The Cong-Viettel	(Brazil) **João Pedro**	(Brazil) **Pedro Henrique**	(Uzbekistan) Jahongir Abdumominov			(Brazil) Adriano Narcizo (Brazil) Bruno Cantanhede (Brazil) Jeferson Elias (Egypt) Mohamed Essam

=== Dual nationality Vietnamese players ===
- Players name in **bold** indicates the player was registered after the start of the season.
- Player's name in italics indicates Overseas Vietnamese players whom have obtained a Vietnamese passport and citizenship, therefore being considered as local players.

Club	Player 1	Player 2	Player 3
Becamex Binh Duong	(Uganda) (Vietnam) Trần Trung Hiếu		
Dong A Thanh Hoa			
Haiphong	(Australia) (Vietnam) Martin Lò	(France) (Vietnam) A Sân	
Hanoi FC			
Cong An Hanoi	(Czech Republic) (Vietnam) Nguyễn Filip^{1}		
Ho Chi Minh City	(United States) (Vietnam) Lê Trung Vinh		
LPBank Hoang Anh Gia Lai			
Hong Linh Ha Tinh			
Khanh Hoa			
Quang Nam	(Nigeria) (Vietnam) Hoàng Vũ Samson		
Quy Nhon Binh Dinh	(Czech Republic) (Vietnam) Mạc Hồng Quân^{1}	(Germany) (Vietnam) Adriano Schmidt^{1}	(Russia) (Vietnam) Đặng Văn Lâm^{1}
Song Lam Nghe An			
Thep Xanh Nam Dinh			
The Cong-Viettel			

Notes:

^1 Capped for Vietnam national team.

== Standings ==
=== League table ===
2023/24 Night Wolf V.League 1 Ranking table
Pos	Team	Pld	W	D	L	GF	GA	GD	Pts	Promotion or relegation
1	Thep Xanh Nam Dinh (C, Q)	26	16	5	5	60	38	+22	53	Qualification to the AFC Champions League Two group stage
2	MerryLand Quy Nhon Binh Dinh	26	13	8	5	47	28	+19	47	
3	Hanoi FC	26	13	4	9	45	37	+8	43	
4	Ho Chi Minh City	26	11	7	8	30	26	+4	40	
5	The Cong-Viettel	26	10	8	8	29	28	+1	38	
6	Cong An Hanoi	26	11	4	11	44	35	+9	37	
7	Haiphong	26	9	8	9	42	39	+3	35	
8	Becamex Binh Duong	26	10	5	11	33	34	−1	35	
9	Dong A Thanh Hoa (Note: Dong A Thanh Hoa initially qualified for the 2024–25 AFC Champions League Two group stage as the 2023–24 Vietnamese Cup winners, but later withdrew due to financial difficulties.)	26	9	8	9	34	39	−5	35	
10	Quang Nam	26	8	8	10	34	36	−2	32	
11	LPBank Hoang Anh Gia Lai	26	8	8	10	22	35	−13	32	
12	Song Lam Nghe An	26	7	9	10	27	32	−5	30	
13	Hong Linh Ha Tinh (O)	26	7	9	10	25	32	−7	30	Qualification for relegation play-offs
14	Khanh Hoa (R)	26	2	5	19	19	52	−33	11	Relegation to 2024–25 V.League 2

Source: VPF
Rules for classification: 1) Points; 2) Goal difference; 3) Goals scored; 4) Head-to-head points; 5) Away goals scored; 6) Disciplinary points.
(C) Champions; (O) Play-off winners; (Q) Qualified for the phase indicated; (R) Relegated

== Results ==
Home \ Away	BBD	DTH	HPG	HAN	HNP	HGL	HCM	HHT	KHA	QNA	QBD	SNA	TND	VTL
Becamex Binh Duong	—	1–0	1–0	0–1	4–1	0–1	1–2	1–0	3–1	1–1	1–1	3–2	3–2	0–0
Dong A Thanh Hoa	3–2	—	3–2	2–0	0–2	1–2	1–1	2–2	1–1	3–1	0–0	3–1	2–5	0–5
Haiphong	3–1	2–0	—	0–1	3–1	1–1	2–0	3–2	3–1	0–0	0–1	2–2	1–3	1–1
Hanoi FC	3–3	2–1	3–5	—	2–1	2–0	3–1	1–1	5–2	3–1	0–1	2–0	1–2	0–2
Cong An Hanoi	3–0	3–1	5–1	2–0	—	5–0	2–0	1–1	3–1	0–0	1–1	2–0	2–3	1–2
LPBank Hoang Anh Gia Lai	1–1	1–1	2–1	2–0	0–3	—	2–1	2–1	1–1	0–0	0–1	1–0	1–1	1–2
Ho Chi Minh City	1–0	2–0	1–1	1–3	2–1	4–1	—	0–1	2–0	1–0	2–1	1–0	1–1	2–0
Hong Linh Ha Tinh	2–0	0–0	1–1	2–2	1–0	1–0	2–1	—	1–0	1–2	0–4	1–1	2–4	1–1
Khanh Hoa	0–2	0–2	2–4	0–1	2–1	0–0	0–1	0–1	—	0–5	1–2	0–1	2–3	0–1
Quang Nam	2–1	0–2	2–0	0–3	2–0	1–1	1–1	1–0	0–1	—	1–1	4–2	1–3	2–0
MerryLand Quy Nhon Binh Dinh	0–2	2–3	1–1	4–2	4–1	3–1	1–1	2–0	2–2	3–0	—	1–2	2–1	4–1
Song Lam Nghe An	1–0	0–1	0–0	1–1	0–1	1–0	0–0	1–1	2–1	4–4	2–0	—	0–1	1–1
Thep Xanh Nam Dinh	3–1	1–1	2–4	3–2	2–2	3–0	2–1	1–0	5–1	2–1	2–4	1–1	—	3–0
The Cong-Viettel	0–1	1–1	2–1	0–2	3–0	0–1	0–0	1–0	0–0	3–2	1–1	0–2	2–1	—

Source: VPF
Legend: Blue = home team win; Yellow = draw; Red = away team win.

=== Position by round ===
Team ╲ Round	1	2	3	4	5	6	7	8	9	10	11	12	13	14	15	16	17	18	19	20	21	22	23	24	25	26
Cong An Hanoi	8	2	2	4	5	6	8	5	5	5	3	3	3	3	2	3	4	2	4	4	6	8	9	6	5	6
Hanoi FC	12	13	14	10	9	8	7	8	10	6	9	7	6	7	6	6	7	7	6	5	3	3	3	3	3	3
The Cong-Viettel	7	9	5	8	7	9	10	11	12	12	12	13	13	9	10	12	11	12	9	8	7	5	5	5	4	5
Dong A Thanh Hoa	4	7	4	2	2	3	4	4	2	2	4	4	4	5	5	5	6	5	5	7	9	9	7	8	9	8
Thep Xanh Nam Dinh	2	1	1	1	1	2	1	1	1	1	1	1	1	1	1	1	1	1	1	1	1	1	1	1	1	1
Haiphong	9	3	6	3	4	4	6	7	8	10	10	9	9	10	9	7	5	6	7	6	5	6	4	4	6	7
MerryLand Quy Nhon Binh Dinh	6	11	8	7	8	5	3	2	4	4	5	5	5	4	4	4	3	3	3	3	2	2	2	2	2	2
Hong Linh Ha Tinh	3	6	10	13	13	14	13	12	11	9	11	11	10	8	7	8	12	11	8	12	13	10	11	12	11	13
Song Lam Nghe An	10	8	11	9	11	11	11	10	7	8	8	10	11	12	13	13	13	13	13	13	11	11	12	13	13	12
LPBank Hoang Anh Gia Lai	5	12	13	14	14	13	14	14	14	14	14	12	12	13	12	11	10	10	12	11	12	13	13	11	12	10
Khanh Hoa	14	14	9	11	12	12	12	13	13	13	13	14	14	14	14	14	14	14	14	14	14	14	14	14	14	14
Becamex Binh Duong	11	5	3	6	3	1	2	3	3	3	2	2	2	2	3	2	2	4	2	2	4	4	8	9	8	9
Ho Chi Minh City	1	4	7	5	6	7	5	6	6	7	6	6	7	6	8	10	9	9	11	10	8	7	6	7	6	4
Quang Nam	13	10	12	12	10	10	9	9	9	11	7	8	8	11	11	9	8	8	10	9	10	12	10	10	10	11

Champion and qualification to the 2024–25 AFC Champions League Two group stage
Qualification for relegation play-offs
Relegation to 2024–2025 V.League 2

Source: VPF

== Relegation play-offs ==
The 2023–24 season ended with a relegation play-off game between the 13th-placed V.League 1 team, Hong Linh Ha Tinh, and the V.League 2 runner-up, PVF-CAND.

6 July 2024
18:00 UTC+7

Hong Linh Ha Tinh	3–2	PVF-CAND
Nguyễn Trọng Hoàng 48'; Trần Đình Tiến 73' (pen.); Nguyễn Văn Nhuần 83'	Report	Nguyễn Hiểu Minh 28'; Lê Minh Bình 90+4'

Referee: Mohamad Ismail (Malaysia)

Hong Linh Ha Tinh won 3–2, and therefore both clubs remained in their respective leagues.

== Statistics ==
=== Top scorers ===
As of 30 June 2024

Rank	Player	Club	Goals
1	(Brazil) Rafaelson	Thep Xanh Nam Dinh	31
2	(Brazil) Alan Grafite	MerryLand Quy Nhon Binh Dinh	17
3	(Brazil) Jeferson Elías	Cong An Hanoi	13
3	(Nigeria) Michael Olaha	Song Lam Nghe An	13
3	(Vietnam) Hoàng Vũ Samson	Quang Nam	13
6	(Brazil) Lucão do Break	Haiphong	12
7	(Uganda) Joseph Mpande	Haiphong	11
7	(Vietnam) Nguyễn Văn Quyết	Hanoi FC	11
9	(Jamaica) Rimario Gordon	Dong A Thanh Hoa	10
9	(Brazil) Hêndrio	Thep Xanh Nam Dinh	10

=== Hat-tricks ===
Player	For	Against	Result	Date
(Brazil) Lucão do Break	Haiphong	Hanoi FC	5–3 (A)	29 October 2023
(Cameroon) Joel Tagueu	Hanoi FC	Haiphong	3–5 (H)	29 October 2023
(Nigeria) Michael Olaha	Song Lam Nghe An	Quang Nam	4–4 (H)	2 December 2023
(Brazil) Rafaelson	Thep Xanh Nam Dinh	Becamex Binh Duong	3–1 (H)	8 May 2024
(Brazil) Jeferson Elías	Cong An Hanoi	Khanh Hoa	3–1 (H)	12 May 2024
(Brazil) Lucão do Break	Haiphong	Thep Xanh Nam Dinh	4–2 (A)	22 May 2024
(Brazil) Rafaelson^{5}	Thep Xanh Nam Dinh	Dong A Thanh Hoa	5–2 (A)	26 May 2024
(Vietnam) Hoàng Vũ Samson^{4}	Quang Nam	Khanh Hoa	5–0 (A)	15 June 2024
(Brazil) Alan Grafite	MerryLand Quy Nhon Binh Dinh	Hanoi FC	4–2 (H)	20 June 2024
(Brazil) Rafaelson	Thep Xanh Nam Dinh	Khanh Hoa	5–1 (H)	25 June 2024

== Attendances ==
Home	Away														Attendance	
Home	BBD	DTH	HPG	HAN	HNP	HGL	HCM	HHT	KHA	QNA	QBD	SNA	TND	VTL	Total	Average
Becamex Binh Duong	—N/a	7,200	6,500	6,000	6,800	2,500	2,500	4,000	2,500	3,000	3,000	4,500	8,200	4,500	61,200	4,708
Dong A Thanh Hoa	5,000	—N/a	5,000	9,000	8,000	5,000	4,000	8,000	2,000	2,000	3,000	8,000	7,000	3,000	69,000	5,308
Haiphong	7,000	6,000	—N/a	6,000	13,000	15,000	4,000	8,000	8,000	8,000	10,000	7,000	15,000	9,000	116,000	8,923
Hanoi FC	5,000	5,000	4,000	—N/a	7,000	3,000	2,000	5,000	2,000	5,500	5,000	6,000	10,000	6,000	65,500	5,038
Cong An Hanoi	5,000	12,000	7,000	12,000	—N/a	2,000	8,000	10,000	1,000	8,000	6,000	11,000	10,000	12,000	104,000	8,000
LPBank Hoang Anh Gia Lai	5,000	4,500	5,000	5,000	10,000	—N/a	5,000	5,000	5,500	6,000	4,000	5,000	6,000	5,000	66,000	5,077
Ho Chi Minh City	6,000	4,000	6,000	5,000	7,000	4,500	—N/a	3,000	5,000	4,000	5,000	4,000	6,000	7,000	66,500	5,115
Hong Linh Ha Tinh	5,000	7,000	5,000	3,000	5,000	5,000	4,000	—N/a	3,000	3,000	2,500	5,000	6,000	5,500	59,000	4,538
Khanh Hoa	6,000	5,000	3,000	6,500	5,000	5,000	3,000	6,000	—N/a	800	3,000	5,000	6,000	3,000	54,300	4,408
Quang Nam	1,000	2,000	3,000	1,500	2,000	2,000	5,000	4,000	4,000	—N/a	3,000	2,500	2,000	3,000	35,000	2,692
MerryLand Quy Nhon Binh Dinh	5,000	5,000	4,500	6,000	9,000	3,000	6,000	3,000	5,000	3,000	—N/a	6,000	6,000	4,500	66,000	5,077
Song Lam Nghe An	7,000	4,000	3,000	2,000	7,000	4,000	5,000	10,000	5,000	2,000	4,000	—N/a	7,000	7,000	67,000	5,154
Thep Xanh Nam Dinh	15,000	18,000	13,000	11,000	10,000	7,000	10,000	12,000	25,000	12,000	15,000	14,000	—N/a	10,000	172,000	13,230
The Cong-Viettel	3,500	4,000	4,000	7,000	8,000	5,000	5,000	5,000	2,000	4,000	2,000	5,000	8,000	—N/a	62,500	4,808
Total League Attendance															1,072,000	5,890

Last updated : 30 June 2024

Source :

== Awards ==
=== Monthly awards ===
Month	Manager of the Month		Player of the Month		Goal of the Month	
Month	Manager	Club	Player	Club	Player	Club
November	(Vietnam) Vũ Hồng Việt	Thep Xanh Nam Dinh	(Brazil) Rafaelson	Thep Xanh Nam Dinh	(Vietnam) Phạm Tuấn Hải	Hanoi FC
December	(Vietnam) Lê Huỳnh Đức	Becamex Binh Duong	(Brazil) Rafaelson	Thep Xanh Nam Dinh	(Brazil) Júnior Fialho	Cong An Hanoi
March	(Vietnam) Vũ Hồng Việt	Thep Xanh Nam Dinh	(Brazil) Rafaelson	Thep Xanh Nam Dinh	(Vietnam) Phạm Tuấn Hải	Hanoi FC
April	(Vietnam) Chu Đình Nghiêm	Haiphong	(Brazil) Rafaelson	Thep Xanh Nam Dinh	(Vietnam) Nguyễn Văn Đức	MerryLand Quy Nhon Binh Dinh
May	(Japan) Daiki Iwamasa	Hanoi FC	(Brazil) Rafaelson	Thep Xanh Nam Dinh	(Brazil) Rafaelson	Thep Xanh Nam Dinh
June	(Vietnam) Bùi Đoàn Quang Huy	MerryLand Quy Nhon Binh Dinh	(Vietnam) Nguyễn Văn Quyết	Hanoi FC	(Vietnam) Đỗ Hùng Dũng	Hanoi FC

=== Annual awards ===
Award	Winner	Club
Manager of the Year	(Vietnam) Vũ Hồng Việt	Thep Xanh Nam Dinh
Player of the Year	(Brazil) Rafaelson	Thep Xanh Nam Dinh
Best Young Player	(Vietnam) Bùi Vĩ Hào	Becamex Binh Duong
Goal of the Year	(Brazil) Rafaelson	Thep Xanh Nam Dinh

Best XI
Goalkeeper	(Slovakia) Patrik Le Giang (Ho Chi Minh City)			
Defenders	(Vietnam) Ngô Tùng Quốc (Ho Chi Minh City)	(Vietnam) Bùi Hoàng Việt Anh (Cong An Hanoi)	(Vietnam) Phan Tuấn Tài (The Cong-Viettel)	(Vietnam) Nguyễn Văn Đức (MerryLand Quy Nhon Binh Dinh)
Midfielders	(Vietnam) Nguyễn Văn Toàn (Thep Xanh Nam Dinh)	(Vietnam) Nguyễn Hoàng Đức (The Cong-Viettel)	(Vietnam) Nguyễn Thái Sơn (Dong A Thanh Hoa)	(Vietnam) Nguyễn Văn Quyết (Hanoi FC)
Forwards	(Brazil) Rafaelson (Thep Xanh Nam Dinh)		(Vietnam) Phạm Tuấn Hải (Hanoi FC)	
