= Nguyễn Văn Đức =

Vietnamese footballer (born 1996)

Personal information
- Birth name: Nguyễn Văn Đức
- Date of birth: 13 January 1996 (age 30)
- Place of birth: Thái Bình, Vietnam
- Height: 1.68 m (5 ft 6 in)
- Position: Right back

Team information
- Current team: Đồng Nai City
- Number: 18

Youth career
- 2015–2017: Hà Nội

Senior career*
| Years | Team | Apps | (Gls) |
| 2018–2023 | Hồng Lĩnh Hà Tĩnh | 66 | (2) |
| 2023–2024 | Quy Nhơn Bình Định | 25 | (6) |
| 2024–2026 | Công An Hà Nội | 28 | (0) |
| 2026– | Đồng Nai City | 2 | (0) |
- * Club domestic league appearances and goals as of 13 September 2026

Nguyễn Văn Đức (born 13 January 1996) is a Vietnamese professional footballer who plays as a right back for V.League 1 club Đồng Nai City.

== Club career ==
Born in Thái Bình, Văn Đức was a youth product of the Hà Nội FC youth Academy. In 2017, he made his career debut with Hà Nội's reserve side (the club was later converted to Hồng Lĩnh Hà Tĩnh in 2019). He was part of the squad that won the 2019 V.League 2.

In September 2023, Văn Đức joined Quy Nhơn Bình Định. He was an important member of the team, appearing in 25 league games and netted 6 goals, contributing a big part in the team's runner-up campaign in the 2023–24 V.League 1. As a result, he was named in the league's Team of the season.

In July 2024, Văn Đức signed for V.League 1 fellow Công An Hà Nội.

In July 2026, Văn Đức was transferred to newly promoted V.League 1 club Đồng Nai City.

== Honours ==
Hồng Lĩnh Hà Tĩnh

- V.League 2: 2019

Công An Hà Nội

- V.League 1: 2025–26
- Vietnamese National Cup: 2024–25
- Vietnamese Super Cup: 2025

Individual

- V.League 1 Team of the season: 2023–24
