= Vadim Nguyen =

Russian footballer (born 2005)

Vadim Nguyen Nguyễn Vadim
Personal information
- Full name: Nguyễn Vadim
- Birth name: Vadim Cuongovich Nguyen
- Date of birth: 22 February 2005 (age 21)
- Place of birth: Rostov-on-Don, Russia
- Height: 1.75 m (5 ft 9 in)
- Position: Winger

Team information
- Current team: SHB Đà Nẵng
- Number: 7

Youth career
- 2011–2016: Quadro Rostov-na-Donu
- 2016–2024: Rostov

Senior career*
Years	Team	Apps	(Gls)
2025	Rostov-2	0	(0)
2025–	SHB Đà Nẵng	8	(0)

International career^{‡}
2025–	Vietnam U23	2	(0)
- * Club domestic league appearances and goals as of 7 June 2026 ‡ National team caps and goals as of 13 October 2025

Vadim Cuongovich Nguyen (Russian: Вадим Кыонгович Нгуен; born 22 February 2005), also known as Nguyễn Vadim, is a professional footballer who plays as a winger for V.League 1 club SHB Đà Nẵng. Born in Russia, he represents Vietnam at youth level.

== Club career ==
Vadim was a youth product of FC Rostov. At the beginning of 2024, he signed his first professional contract with Rostov. After being released by Rostov in summer 2025, Vadim moved to Vietnam and went on a trial with SHB Đà Nẵng. After good performances in the team's pre-season friendlies, Vadim was signed by SHB Đà Nẵng. He made his professional debut on 27 August 2025, in the first matchday of the 2025–26 V.League 1, coming as a substitute in his team's 1–1 draw against Đông Á Thanh Hóa.

== International career ==
In 2024, Vadim was named in Vietnam U23's 50-men preliminary squad for the 2024 AFC U-23 Asian Cup but didn't make the final cut. In October 2025, he received his first call to the Vietnam under-23 national team.

== Personal life ==
Vadim was born in Russia to a Russian mother and Vietnamese father.

== Career statistics ==
As of 7 June 2026

Appearances and goals by club, season and competition
Club	Season	League			National cup		Other		Total	
Club	Season	Division	Apps	Goals	Apps	Goals	Apps	Goals	Apps	Goals
SHB Da Nang	2025–26	V.League 1	8	0	1	0	—		9	0
Career total			8	0	1	0	0	0	9	0
