= Ryan Ha =

French professional footballer (born 1997)

Personal information
- Full name: Ryan Ha
- Date of birth: 24 August 1997 (age 29)
- Place of birth: Paris, France
- Height: 1.84 m (6 ft 0 in)
- Position: Winger

Team information
- Current team: Hoang Anh Gia Lai
- Number: 77

Youth career
- 2011–2013: UMS Pontault-Combault
- 2013–2015: CS Brétigny
- 2015–2016: Edusport Academy
- 2016–2017: Besançon

Senior career*
Years	Team	Apps	(Gls)
2017	Besançon	14	(4)
2018	Ornans	12	(2)
2018–2019	CS Brétigny	26	(4)
2019	Aubervilliers	2	(1)
2019–2020	Torcy	5	(0)
2020–2021	JA Drancy	0	(0)
2021–2022	Is-Selongey	12	(1)
2023	Khanh Hoa	17	(2)
2023–2024	Becamex Binh Duong	4	(0)
2024	Hanoi FC	4	(0)
2024–2025	PVF-CAND	6	(0)
2025–	Hoang Anh Gia Lai	12	(1)
- * Club domestic league appearances and goals as of 7 June 2026

Ryan Ha (born 24 August 1997) is a French professional footballer who plays as a winger for V.League 1 club Hoang Anh Gia Lai.

== Early life ==
Ryan Ha was born in Paris, France, to Vietnamese parents.

== Club career ==
=== Early career ===
Ha began his football career at the age of ten playing for local clubs before training at the Edusport Academy in Glasgow, Scotland for a season. After that, he mainly played for clubs in the Championnat National 3.

=== Khanh Hoa FC ===
In 2022, Ha went to Vietnam for a trial at the newly promoted V.League 1 team Khánh Hòa. After a good performance in pre season friendly tournaments, he was registered by Khanh Hoa to their 2023 V.League 1 squad list as their unnaturalized Vietnamese player slot. Ryan Ha made his professional debut with Khanh Hoa in a 1–0 V.League 1 loss to Dong A Thanh Hoa on 3 January 2023. He score his first goal in V.League 1 against Ho Chi Minh City FC.

=== Becamex Binh Duong ===
On 26 September 2023, Becamex Binh Duong announced on their Facebook account that Ha has transferred to the club. He was given the number 7 shirt. Ha made his debut on 3 December 2023, coming on in the 73rd minute as a substitute replacing Bùi Vĩ Hào, in a 1–1 draw with Hoang Anh Gia Lai.

=== Hanoi FC ===
On 27 February 2024, Ha joined V.League 1 fellow Hanoi FC, signing a short-term contract which ends after the 2023–24 V.League 1 season. He made his debut on 3 March in a match against former club, Khanh Hoa FC.

=== Hoang Anh Gia Lai ===
On 29 July 2025, Ha signed for Hoang Anh Gia Lai as a free agent.

== Career statistics ==
As of match played 7 June 2026

Appearances and goals by club, season and competition
Club	Season	League			Cup		Other		Total	
Club	Season	Division	Apps	Goals	Apps	Goals	Apps	Goals	Apps	Goals
Besançon	2017–18	National 3	2	0	0	0	–		2	0
CS Brétigny	2018–19	National 3	26	4	0	0	–		26	4
Aubervilliers	2019–20	National 3	2	1	0	0	–		2	1
Torcy	2019–20	National 3	5	0	–		–		5	0
JA Drancy	2020–21	National 3	0	0	–		–		0	0
Is-Selongey	2021–22	National 3	8	1	0	0	–		8	1
Is-Selongey	2022–23	National 3	5	0	0	0	–		5	0
Is-Selongey	Total		13	1	0	0	0	0	13	1
Khanh Hoa	2023	V.League 1	17	2	1	0	—		18	2
Becamex Binh Duong	2023–24	V.League 1	4	0	0	0	—		4	0
Hanoi FC	2023–24	V.League 1	4	0	1	0	—		5	0
PVF-CAND	2024–25	V.League 2	6	0	2	0	—		8	0
Hoang Anh Gia Lai	2025–26	V.League 1	12	1	1	0	—		13	1
Career total			91	9	5	0	0	0	96	9
