= João Guilherme (footballer, born 1994) =

Brazilian footballer

Personal information
- Full name: João Guilherme Barcelos Neto Nogueira
- Date of birth: 27 July 1994 (age 32)
- Place of birth: Maringá, Brazil
- Height: 1.81 m (5 ft 11 in)
- Position: Forward

Team information
- Current team: Manauara

Youth career
- 2011–2013: Santo André

Senior career*
Years	Team	Apps	(Gls)
2013	Santo André	0	(0)
2014	Operário-MS		
2015	Rio Preto	5	(0)
2016	Confiança	6	(1)
2016–2017	Foz do Iguaçu	12	(3)
2017	Grêmio Maringá		
2018	Boa Esporte	10	(1)
2018	Portuguesa	0	(0)
2019	Foz do Iguaçu	15	(1)
2020	CEOV	7	(6)
2020	Boa Esporte	5	(1)
2020	Villa Nova	8	(1)
2020	São José-RS	0	(0)
2021–2022	Monte Azul	12	(1)
2022	CEOV	13	(2)
2022	Mixto	0	(0)
2023	Becamex Binh Duong	2	(0)
2023	Mixto	2	(0)
2023	→ União Rondonópolis (loan)	7	(0)
2024	PSTC	9	(0)
2024	Catanduva	6	(1)
2024	Caldense	9	(2)
2024	Portuguesa	0	(0)
2025	Desportiva Ferroviária	12	(6)
2026–	Manauara	21	(5)
2026	→ São José-SP (loan)	0	(0)
- * Club domestic league appearances and goals as of 13:19, 27 July 2026 (UTC)

João Guilherme Barcelos Neto Nogueira (born 27 July 1994), known as João Guilherme, is a Brazilian footballer who plays as a forward for Manauara.

== Career ==
Born in Iguatemi, Maringá, Paraná, João Guilherme was a Santo André youth graduate, and made his first team debut on 17 July 2013 in a 1–1 Copa Paulista home draw against Audax. He subsequently represented Operário-MS and Rio Preto before signing for Confiança in December 2015.

In 2016, João Guilherme joined Foz do Iguaçu, and played in the 2017 Série D with the club. He finished the year at Grêmio Maringá, before playing for Boa Esporte and Portuguesa in the 2018 season.

João Guilherme returned to Foz for the 2019 campaign, before scoring six goals in the 2020 Campeonato Mato-Grossense with CEOV. He subsequently returned to Boa, and represented Villa Nova and São José-RS in the remainder of the year.

On 14 February 2021, João Guilherme agreed to a deal with Monte Azul. He returned to CEOV on 31 March 2022, and had a short spell at Mixto before moving to Vietnamese side Becamex Binh Duong.

After featuring rarely, João Guilherme returned to Mixto on 17 February 2023, but was loaned to União Rondonópolis on 4 May. Ahead of the 2024 season, he joined PSTC, and played for Catanduva for a short period before being announced at Caldense on 26 April of that year.

On 5 July 2024, João Guilherme returned to Lusa for the state cup, but left on 23 August due to personal reasons. On 28 November, he was announced at Desportiva Ferroviária for the upcoming season.

On 21 October 2025, after scoring a career-best seven goals, João Guilherme agreed to a deal with Manauara. The following 24 July, he was loaned to São José-SP.

== Career statistics ==
As of 20 October 2026

Club	Season	League			State League		Cup		Continental		Other		Total	
Club	Season	Division	Apps	Goals	Apps	Goals	Apps	Goals	Apps	Goals	Apps	Goals	Apps	Goals
Santo André	2013	Série D	0	0	—		—		—		2 (Note: Appearance(s) in Copa Paulista)	0	2	0
Rio Preto	2015	Paulista A3	—		5	0	—		—		—		5	0
Confiança	2016	Série C	0	0	6	1	1	0	—		4 (Note: Appearance(s) in Copa do Nordeste)	0	11	1
Foz do Iguaçu	2016	Paranaense	—		—		—		—		4 (Note: Appearance(s) in Taça FPF)	2	4	2
Foz do Iguaçu	2017	Série D	3	0	9	3	—		—		—		12	3
Foz do Iguaçu	Total		3	0	9	3	—		—		4	2	16	5
Boa Esporte	2018	Série B	0	0	10	1	1	0	—		—		11	1
Portuguesa	2018	Paulista A2	—		—		—		—		3	0	3	0
Foz do Iguaçu	2019	Série D	5	1	10	0	2	0	—		—		17	1
CEOV	2020	Série D	0	0	7	6	1	0	—		—		8	6
Boa Esporte	2020	Série C	4	1	1	0	—		—		—		5	1
Villa Nova	2020	Série D	8	1	—		—		—		—		8	1
São José-RS	2020	Série C	0	0	—		—		—		5 (Note: Appearance(s) in Copa FGF)	0	5	0
Monte Azul	2021	Paulista A2	—		2	1	—		—		—		2	1
Monte Azul	2022	Paulista A2	—		10	0	—		—		—		10	0
Monte Azul	Total		—		12	1	—		—		—		12	1
CEOV	2022	Série D	13	2	—		—		—		—		13	2
Mixto	2022	Mato-Grossense 2ª Divisão	—		—		—		—		8 (Note: Appearance(s) in Copa FMF)	2	8	2
Becamex Binh Duong	2023	V.League 1	2	0	—		0	0	—		—		2	0
Mixto	2023	Mato-Grossense	—		2	0	—		—		5	0	7	0
União Rondonópolis (loan)	2023	Série D	7	0	—		—		—		—		7	0
PSTC	2024	Paranaense	—		9	0	—		—		—		9	0
Catanduva	2024	Paulista A3	—		6	1	—		—		—		6	1
Caldense	2024	Mineiro Módulo II	—		9	2	—		—		—		9	2
Portuguesa	2024	Paulista	—		—		—		—		4	0	4	0
Desportiva Ferroviária	2025	Capixaba	—		12	6	—		—		11 (Note: Appearance(s) in Copa Espírito Santo)	1	23	7
Manauara	2026	Série D	12	2	9	3	2	1	—		—		23	6
São José-SP (loan)	2026	Paulista A2	—		—		—		—		8	0	8	0
Career total			54	6	107	24	7	1	0	0	54	5	217	36

== Honours ==
São José-SP

- Copa Paulista: 2026
