= Jeferson Elías =

Brazilian footballer (born 1998)

Personal information
- Full name: Jeferson Elías Braga Montimor
- Date of birth: 12 January 1998 (age 28)
- Place of birth: Brazil
- Height: 1.86 m (6 ft 1 in)
- Position: Striker

Team information
- Current team: Chanthaburi
- Number: 99

Youth career
- Atlético Mineiro

Senior career*
Years	Team	Apps	(Gls)
–2020	Democrata	3	(0)
2020–2022	Patrocinense	6	(0)
2022	Trabalhadore	18	(11)
2023	Viettel	13	(0)
2023–2024	Hanoi Police	23	(13)
2024	Hoang Anh Gia Lai	7	(0)
2025–	Chanthaburi	10	(2)
- * Club domestic league appearances and goals as of 1 April 2025

Jeferson Elías Braga Montimor (born 12 January 1998), simply known as Jeferson, is a Brazilian professional footballer who plays as a striker for Thai League 2 team Chanthaburi.

== Club career ==
During his youth career, Jeferson played for Atlético Mineiro before being released. He then played for low-tier clubs in Brazil such as Democrata, Patrocinense and Trabalhadore.

In January 2023, Jeferson joined Vietnamese side Viettel and signed his first professional contract there. In his only season with the club, he scored 2 goals in the Vietnamese Cup games but failed to net any goal in the V.League 1 and was therefore released at the end of the season.

On 2 November 2023, Jeferson signed for V.League 1 fellow Hanoi Police. On 12 May 2024, he scored his first hat-trick at professional level to help his team win 3–1 against Khánh Hòa in a league game.

On 8 September 2024, Jeferson moved to Hoang Anh Gia Lai.

On 4 January 2025, Jeferson was transferred to Thai League 2 side Chanthaburi.

== Career statistics ==
As of match played 4 January 2025

Appearances and goals by club, season and competition
Club	Season	League			Cup		Other		Total	
Club	Season	Division	Apps	Goals	Apps	Goals	Apps	Goals	Apps	Goals
Viettel	2023	V.League 1	13	0	3	2	—		16	2
Hanoi Police	2023–24	V.League 1	23	13	2	1	—		25	14
Hoang Anh Gia Lai	2024–25	V.League 1	7	0	0	0	—		7	0
Total			43	13	5	3	0	0	48	16
