= Phạm Thanh Tiệp =

Slovak footballer

Personal information
- Full name: Phạm Thanh Tiệp
- Date of birth: 16 March 1996 (age 30)
- Place of birth: Banská Bystrica, Slovakia
- Position: Midfielder

Team information
- Current team: Hong Linh Ha Tinh
- Number: 27

Senior career*
Years	Team	Apps	(Gls)
- Baník Prievidza
2017	MFK Zvolen	13	(0)
	Baník Lehota pod Vtáčnikom	5+	(0+)
2019	SHB Da Nang	2	(0)
2023–	Hong Linh Ha Tinh	0	(0)
- * Club domestic league appearances and goals

Phạm Thanh Tiệp (born 16 March 1996) is a Slovak footballer who plays as a midfielder for V.League 1 side Hong Linh Ha Tinh.

== Career ==
Before the 2019 season, Phạm signed for Vietnamese side Đà Nẵng after playing for Baník Lehota pod Vtáčnikom in the Slovak fifth division.
