= Vincent Trọng Trí Guyenne =

French footballer (born 1992)

Vincent Guyenne
Personal information
- Full name: Vincent Trọng Trí Guyenne
- Date of birth: 16 March 1992 (age 34)
- Place of birth: Lyon, France
- Height: 1.65 m (5 ft 5 in)
- Position: Winger

Senior career*
Years	Team	Apps	(Gls)
2017–2018	Austria Klagenfurt		
2018–2020	Cumberland United		
2020	Askania Bernburg	3	(0)
2022	Phu Dong FC	13	(1)
2023	Ho Chi Minh City	1	(0)
- * Club domestic league appearances and goals as of 11 August 2023

Vincent Trọng Trí Guyenne (born 16 March 1992) is a French footballer who plays as a winger. Besides France, he has played in Austria, Australia, Vietnam, and Germany.

== Career ==
In April 2022, Guyenne signed for V.League 2 club Phu Dong FC. He made his debut against Haiphong FC on 7 April in the 3–1 loss.

Before the 2023 season, he signed for TP.HCM in the Vietnamese top flight. On 3 February 2023, he debuted for TP.HCM during a 0–1 loss to Nam Định.
