= Ngô Tùng Quốc =

Vietnamese footballer

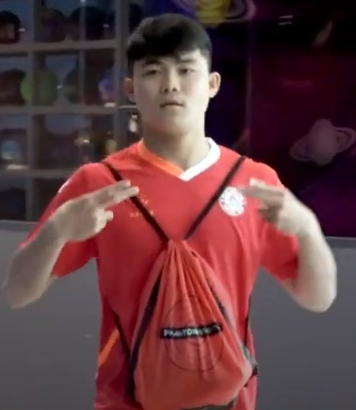
- Tùng Quốc in 2022

Personal information
- Full name: Ngô Tùng Quốc
- Date of birth: 27 January 1998 (age 28)
- Place of birth: Ninh Hòa, Khánh Hòa, Vietnam
- Height: 1.72 m (5 ft 8 in)
- Position: Right-back

Team information
- Current team: Becamex Hồ Chí Minh City
- Number: 2

Youth career
- 2010–2016: PVF Football Academy

Senior career*
Years	Team	Apps	(Gls)
2016	SHB Đà Nẵng	0	(0)
2017–2018	Cần Thơ	36	(1)
2019–2024	Hồ Chí Minh City	99	(3)
2024–	Becamex Hồ Chí Minh City	50	(3)

International career^{‡}
2019	Vietnam U23	3	(0)
- * Club domestic league appearances and goals as of 7 June 2026 ‡ National team caps and goals as of 26 February 2019

Ngô Tùng Quốc (born 27 January 1998) is a professional Vietnamese footballer who plays as a right-back for V.League 2 club Becamex Hồ Chí Minh City.

== Career statistics ==
As of 8 April 2023

Club	Season	League			Cup		Continental		Other		Total	
Club	Season	Division	Apps	Goals	Apps	Goals	Apps	Goals	Apps	Goals	Apps	Goals
Cần Thơ	2017	V.League 1	11	1	0	0	—		—		11	1
Cần Thơ	2018	V.League 1	25	0	0	0	—		—		25	0
Cần Thơ	Total		36	1	0	0	0	0	0	0	36	1
Hồ Chí Minh City	2019	V.League 1	16	0	0	0	—		—		16	0
Hồ Chí Minh City	2020	V.League 1	17	0	0	0	4 (Note: One appearance in AFC Champions League, three in AFC Cup)	0	1 (Note: Appearance in Vietnamese Super Cup)	0	22	0
Hồ Chí Minh City	2021	V.League 1	8	1	0	0	—		—		8	1
Hồ Chí Minh City	2022	V.League 1	22	1	0	0	—		—		22	1
Hồ Chí Minh City	2023	V.League 1	12	1	1	0	—		—		13	1
Hồ Chí Minh City	2023-24	V.League 1	22	1	1	0	—		—		23	1
Hồ Chí Minh City	Total		97	4	2	0	4	0	1	0	104	4
Becamex Bình Dương	2024–25	V.League 1	12	0	2	0	—		—		14	0
Career total			133	5	2	0	4	0	1	0	140	5

== Honours ==
Hồ Chí Minh City

- Vietnamese Super Cup runner-up: 2020
