= Thành Sen =

Thành Sen Phường Thành Sen
- Ward
- Thành Sen ward
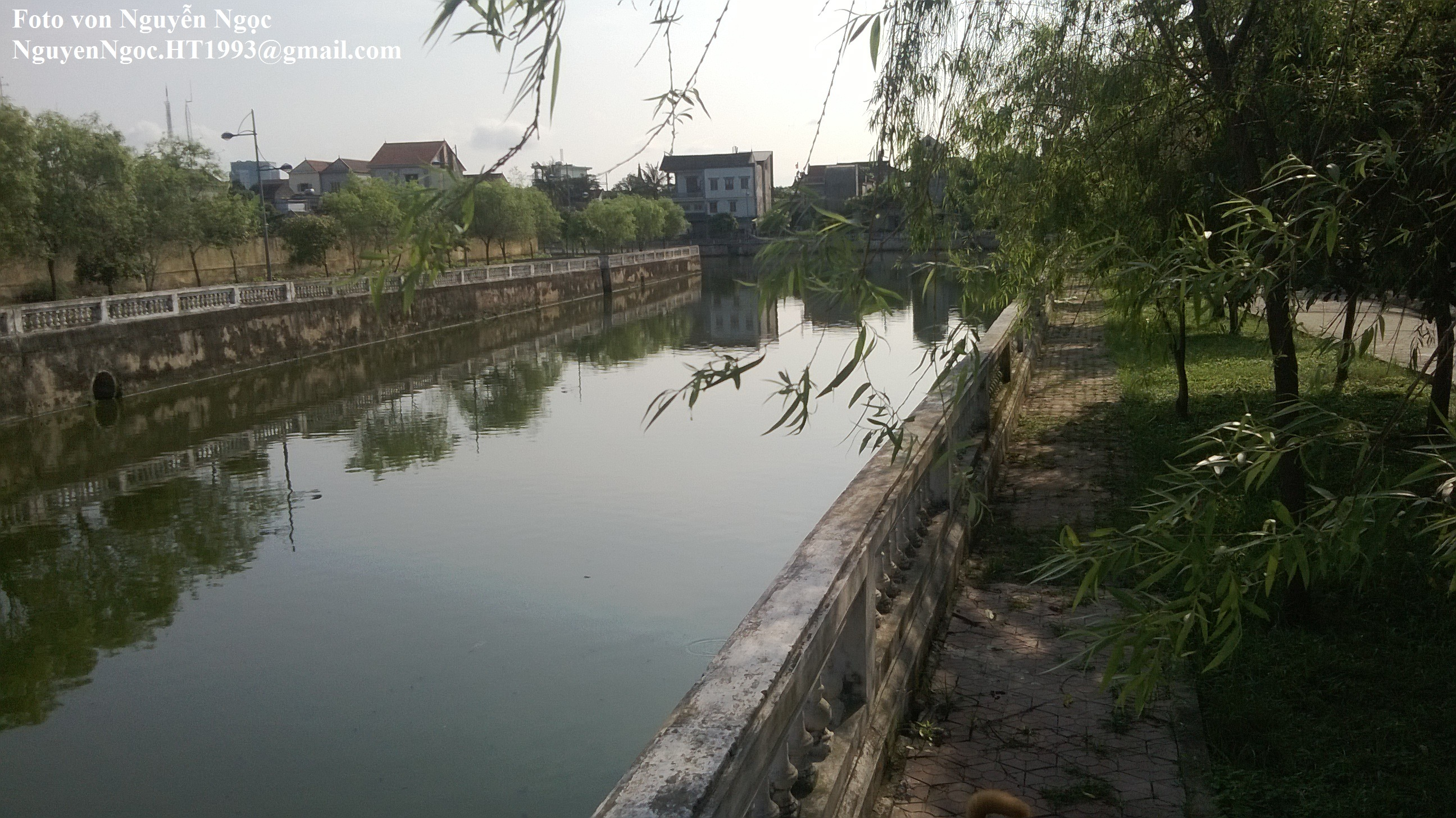
- Lotus City

- Location of in Vietnam
- Coordinates: 18°20′N 105°54′E
- Country: Vietnam
- Province: Ha Tinh

Population (2004)
  - Total: 5,748

Thành Sen is a ward of Ha Tinh Province, Vietnam. It has an area of 4.26 kilometers and 5,748 people as of 2004, when the quarter was established, and the population density is 1,349 per square kilometer.

Thành Sen Ward was established under Resolution No. 1665/NQ-UBTVQH15 of the Standing Committee of the National Assembly of Vietnam, issued on June 16, 2025. Accordingly, the entire natural area and population of the wards of Bắc Hà, Thạch Quý, Tân Giang, Thạch Hưng, Nam Hà, Trần Phú, Hà Huy Tập, and Văn Yên, together with a portion of the natural area and population of Đại Nài Ward, were reorganized to form a new ward named Thành Sen.
