= Gerard Albadalejo =

Spanish football manager

Personal information
- Full name: Gerard Albadalejo Castaño
- Date of birth: 30 August 1983 (age 43)
- Place of birth: Barcelona, Spain
- Position: Midfielder

Team information
- Current team: Becamex Ho Chi Minh City (head coach)

Youth career
- UA Horta

Senior career*
Years	Team	Apps	(Gls)
2002–2004	Sant Andreu		
2004–2006	Turó de la Peira		
2006–2008	Vilassar de Mar		
2008–2009	Cerdanyola del Vallès		

Managerial career
- 2012–2015: Lleida CF (assistant)
- 2015–2017: Lleida CF B
- 2017–2019: Lleida CF
- 2019–2021: Orihuela
- 2022: CE Europa
- 2022–2023: Atlético Saguntino
- 2023–2024: Badalona
- 2025–2026: Ninh Bình
- 2026–: Becamex Ho Chi Minh City
- * Club domestic league appearances and goals

Gerard Albadalejo Castaño (born 30 August 1983) is a Spanish former footballer and current head coach of the V.League 2 club Becamex Ho Chi Minh City.

== Playing career ==
Albadalejo came up through the youth ranks in UA Horta, and then spent his entire career playing for Catalonia teams such as Sant Andreu, Turó de la Peira, Vilassar de Mar, until his retirement at the age of 26 at Cerdanyola del Vallès, after suffering from a fifth metatarsal injury.

== Managerial career ==
After his retirement, Albadalejo coached several youth teams in Catalonia region, before being appointed as Lleida CF's assistant coach in 2012. He then served as Lleida CF's reserves team from 2015 to 2017 before being appointed as the first team coach's that competes in the Segunda División B. On 29 November 2017, his team defeated La Liga side Real Sociedad 3–2 in the Round of 32 of the 2017–18 Copa del Rey.

After being dismissed by Lleida CF in February 2019, Albadalejo coached Segunda División B fellow Orihuela for a year-and-a-half before leading Segunda Federación teams CE Europa and then Atlético Saguntino.

Then with Badalona, Albadalejo lead the team to the 2024 Tercera Federación play-offs, but the team was defeated by L'Hospitalet.

On 2 July 2025, Albadalejo had his first move abroad, to Vietnam, after being appointed as V.League 1 team Ninh Binh.

== Managerial statistics ==
As of match played 6 March 2026

Managerial record by team and tenure
Team	From	To	Record					Ref.
Team	From	To	P	W	D	L	Win %	Ref.
Lleida CF	1 July 2017	2 April 2019	70	29	21	20	41.43	
Orihuela CF	29 February 2019	16 March 2021	28	5	11	12	17.86	
CE Europa	3 February 2022	30 June 2022	15	6	3	6	40.00	
Atlético Saguntino	1 July 2022	31 January 2023	21	4	9	8	19.05	
CF Badalona	22 November 2023	23 September 2024	4	1	1	2	25.00	
Ninh Binh FC	1 July 2025	2 March 2026	16	10	3	3	62.50	
Career Total			154	55	48	51	35.71	
