= Yusuke Adachi =

Japanese footballer and manager

Yusuke Adachi 足達 勇輔
Personal information
- Full name: Yusuke Adachi
- Date of birth: December 5, 1961 (age 64)
- Place of birth: Kanagawa, Japan

Team information
- Current team: Hanoi FC (caretaker head coach)

Youth career
- 1977–1979: Yomiuri

Senior career*
| Years | Team | Apps | (Gls) |
| 1980–1984 | Yomiuri | | |

Managerial career
- 2005–2006: Yokohama FC
- 2016–2019: Hong Kong (Elite Development Coach)
- 2020–2022: Vietnam (Technical Director)
- 2024–2025: Truong Tuoi Binh Phuoc (Technical Director)
- 2025–: Hanoi FC (technical director)
- * Club domestic league appearances and goals

Yusuke Adachi (足達 勇輔, Adachi Yūsuke; born December 5, 1961) is a Japanese football manager and former player. He is currently the technical director of V.League 1 club Hanoi FC.

== Playing career ==
Adachi was born in Kanagawa Prefecture on December 5, 1961. He played for the Yomiuri reserve team from 1980 to 1984.

== Coaching career ==
After retirement, in 1988, Adachi he started coaching career at Fujita Industries (later Bellmare Hiratsuka). He mainly managed youth team until 1998. In 1999, he moved to Cerezo Osaka and he managed youth team until 2001. In 2005, he signed with Yokohama FC. He managed until March 2006.

He was appointed the Elite Development Coach of the Hong Kong Football Association in 2016. From 2020 to 2022, he worked as Technical Director for Vietnam Football Federation.

== Managerial statistics ==
| Team | From | To | Record | | | | |
| Team | From | To | G | W | D | L | Win % |
|---|---|---|---|---|---|---|---|
| Yokohama FC | 2005 | 2006 | 45 | 10 | 15 | 20 | 22.22 |
| Total | | | 45 | 10 | 15 | 20 | 22.22 |
