= Hà Tĩnh Stadium =

Multi-use stadium in Ha Tinh, Vietnam

Sân vận động Hà Tĩnh
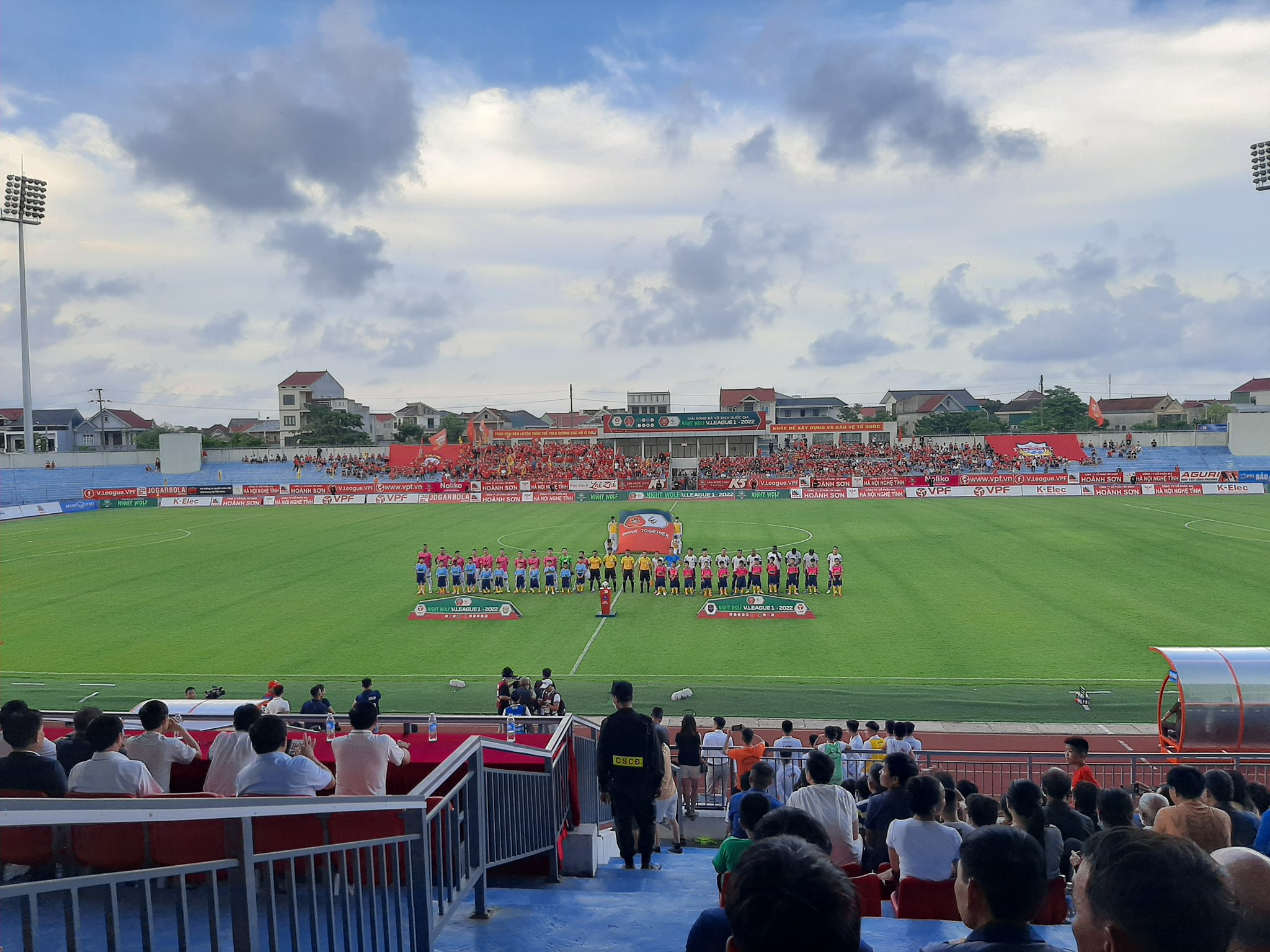
- Hà Tĩnh Stadium in 2022
- Interactive map of Sân vận động Hà Tĩnh
- Location: Thành Sen, Hà Tĩnh, Vietnam
- Coordinates: 18°20′0″N 105°54′27″E
- Owner: Ha Tinh Department of Culture and Sport
- Capacity: 10,000
- Surface: Paspalum grass
- Record attendance: 22,000 (Hồng Lĩnh Hà Tĩnh FC 1–1 Hà Nội, round 6 V.League 2020)

Construction
- Groundbreaking: 1991
- Renovated: 2003, 2019

Tenant
- Hồng Lĩnh Hà Tĩnh FC (2019–now)

Hà Tĩnh Stadium (Vietnamese: Sân vận động Hà Tĩnh) is a football stadium located in Thành Sen ward, Hà Tĩnh, Vietnam. The stadium is the home ground of Hồng Lĩnh Hà Tĩnh FC.

== History ==
The stadium was built and completed in the early 90s of the last century, with a capacity of 15,000 spectators, after the renovation of the yard reduced to 10,000. Although newly built in 1991, but after 20 years of not being maintained and improved, this building was severely damaged and degraded, failing to meet the criteria of a professional football field. In 2003, during the time when Ha Tinh had a team participating in the National Second Division, the yard was invested in renovating the grass surface and a number of items. However, after 15 years, the "Ha Tinh fire pan" has not been serviced and redressed for a while; and by the beginning of 2019, the football field facilities have been seriously degraded. Ha Tinh Stadium also does not have a lighting system for matches that take place in the late afternoon, and there is no drainage system when floods occur.

To secure the playing conditions for Hong Linh Ha Tinh Football Club, the provincial People's Committee has issued an official documentation allowing Hong Linh Ha Tinh Club to use the provincial stadium for practice and competition. At the same time, the Ha Tinh People's Committee agree to the policy of repairing, renovating and upgrading the provincial operation yard to ensure cultural products, well perform cultural and sports tasks, meet the requirements of the II Ha Tinh City's standard, and organize the national professional football tournament. In July 2019, Ha Tinh stadium completed the renovation with a total cost of more than 62 billion VND. However, two floods in 2020 have damaged many constructions of the field. Right after that, Ha Tinh promptly overcame the consequences to soon put it into the home matches of the "Red Mountain" team.
