= Nguyen Nhu Duc Anh =

Germany footballer

Personal information
- Full name: Nguyen Nhu Duc Anh
- Date of birth: 2 January 2000 (age 26)
- Place of birth: Essen, Germany
- Height: 1.84 m (6 ft 0 in)
- Position: Center-back

Team information
- Current team: PVF-CAND
- Number: 3

Youth career
- 2016: Rot-Weiß Oberhausen
- 2016–2019: Rot-Weiss Essen

Senior career*
Years	Team	Apps	(Gls)
2019–2020	FC Kray	19	(1)
2020–2021	SV Straelen	0	(0)
2021–2022	FC Kray	37	(0)
2023	Hải Phòng	1	(0)
2024–	PVF-CAND	11	(0)
- * Club domestic league appearances and goals as of 12 June 2026

Nguyen Nhu Duc Anh (born 2 January 2000) is a German professional footballer who plays as a center-back for V.League 1 team PVF-CAND.

== Career ==
In January 2023 season, Nguyen signed for Vietnamese side Haiphong. He made his debut on 18 February in a 3–2 V.League 1 loss against Hong Linh Ha Tinh. In this match, Haiphong deployed Nguyen at striker in the final 3 minutes.

On 3 October 2024, Nguyen joined V.League 2 side PVF-CAND.
