= Phan Như Thuật =

Vietnamese footballer (born 1984)

Personal information
- Full name: Phan Như Thuật
- Date of birth: March 11, 1984 (age 42)
- Place of birth: Vinh, Nghệ An, Vietnam
- Height: 1.65 m (5 ft 5 in)
- Position: Midfielder

Youth career
- 1995–2003: Sông Lam Nghệ An

Senior career*
Years	Team	Apps	(Gls)
2003–2010	Sông Lam Nghệ An		
2011–2012	Bình Định		
2013–2016	Sông Lam Nghệ An		

International career
1999–2000	Vietnam U16		
2002–2003	Vietnam U23		

Managerial career
- 2020–2023: Sông Lam Nghệ An (assistant)
- 2023–2024: Sông Lam Nghệ An
- 2024–: Sông Lam Nghệ An
- * Club domestic league appearances and goals

Phan Như Thuật (born 11 March 1984) is a Vietnamese football manager and former footballer.

== Career ==
Như Thuật grew up in a family with no sports tradition. He joined the youth academy of his province Sông Lam Nghệ An at the age of 11. He was promoted to the senior team in 2003 and won the 2010 Vietnamese Cup with the team. Due to lack of game time, he joined Bình Định in 2011 but returned to Sông Lam Nghệ An after 2 seasons. He played for 3 more seasons with Sông Lam Nghệ An before taking his retirement in 2016.

He started his career as a coach in 2017, remaining at Sông Lam Nghệ An while working as a youth team coach. He became the assistant manager of the senior team in 2020 before becoming the head coach from June 2023 until May 2024.

== Style of play ==
As a central midfielder, he was known for his passing ability.

== Honours ==
Song Lam Nghe An

- Vietnamese Cup: 2010
