= Vũ Tiến Thành =

Vietnamese football manager (born 1964)

Personal information
- Full name: Vũ Tiến Thành
- Date of birth: 20 March 1964 (age 62)
- Place of birth: Saigon, South Vietnam

Managerial career
- Years: Team
- 1995–2003: Vietnam (assistant)
- 1999–2001: Bưu Điện
- 2020: Sài Gòn
- 2022–2023: Hồ Chí Minh City
- 2024: Hoàng Anh Gia Lai
- 2024–2026: Hoàng Anh Gia Lai (technical director)
- 2026–: Ninh Bình (caretaker)

Vũ Tiến Thành (born 20 March 1964) is a Vietnamese football manager who is currently the interim manager of V.League 1 side Ninh Bình.

== Biography ==
Born in Saigon (now Ho Chi Minh City), Tiến Thành attended the Vietnamese University of Sports and graduated in 1987. After that, thanks to his good expertise and good English skills, he was selected by the Vietnam Football Federation to study coaching in Brazil in 1993, and then he obtained the FIFA "A" level coaching degree in Germany in 1996. His qualifications and his fluency in English allowed him to become the assistant coach for foreign managers in the Vietnam national team from 1995 to 2003.

In June 2004, Tiến Thành was appointed as the executive director of Ngân Hàng Đông Á FC. However, a major case of bribery of referees in 2005 caused the team to disband. Tiến Thành received a 15-month suspended sentence for the frauding case. This event led him to leave the football industry for a long period.

In 2020, he was invited to become the chairman of Vietnamese side Sài Gòn. He was later named as the club's manager, helping the club finish 3rd in the 2020 season. He the coached Hồ Chí Minh City and LPBank HAGL.
