= 2026–27 Cong An Ho Chi Minh City FC season =

68th season in existence of Cong An Ho Chi Minh City FC

Cong An Ho Chi Minh City
2026–27 season
- Owner: Ho Chi Minh City Public Security Departement
- Chairman: Lương Đức Minh
- Head coach: Arthur Diles
- Stadium: Thống Nhất Stadium; Bình Dương Stadium (1st half only)
- V.League 1: 9th
- Vietnamese Cup: Round of 16
- Vietnamese Super Cup: Runners-up
- ASEAN Club Championship: Group stage
- Top goalscorer: League: Nguyễn Tiến Linh; Jason Cummings; Olaha Mạnh Đức (2 each); All: Olaha Mạnh Đức (3)
- Highest home attendance: 8,500 (v. SHB Da Nang, V.League 1, 1 November 2026)
- Lowest home attendance: 4,000 (v. Thể Công–Viettel, V.League 1, 19 October 2026)
- Average home league attendance: 5,833
- Biggest win: 3–1 v. Hanoi FC (H); V.League 1, 5 September 2026
- Biggest defeat: 0–5 v. Cong An Hanoi (A); Vietnamese Super Cup, 30 August 2026
Home colours	Away colours	Third colours
- All statistics correct as of 22 November 2026.

The 2026–27 season is the 68th season in the history of Công An Hồ Chí Minh City, 2nd season as Công An Hồ Chí Minh City after rebranding, and their 10th consecutive season in the top flight of Vietnamese football. In addition to the domestic league, the club is participating in the Vietnamese Cup, Vietnamese Super Cup and the ASEAN Club Championship.

== Current squad ==
As of 11 September 2026

Note: Flags indicate national team as defined under FIFA eligibility rules; some limited exceptions apply. Players may hold more than one non-FIFA nationality.

No.	Pos.	Nation	Player
2	DF	BEL	Lenn-Minh Tran
3	DF	VIE	Lê Khả Đức
4	DF	NED	Dirk Abels
5	DF	VIE	Đinh Quang Kiệt
6	MF	VIE	Đặng Văn Trâm
7	FW	VIE	Olaha Mạnh Đức
8	MF	COL	Juanjo Narváez
9	FW	AUS	Jason Cummings
10	MF	ANG	Aldaír Ferreira
11	MF	VIE	Nguyễn Phi Hoàng
12	MF	BRA	Léo Gomes
13	DF	VIE	Khổng Minh Gia Bảo
16	DF	VIE	Nguyễn Hoàng Minh Nhật
17	DF	VIE	Võ Minh Trọng

No.	Pos.	Nation	Player
19	MF	VIE	Nguyễn Thái Quốc Cường
20	FW	VIE	Phan Văn Đức
21	MF	VIE	Đào Quốc Gia
22	FW	VIE	Nguyễn Tiến Linh (captain)
26	MF	VIE	Ngô Đăng Khoa
27	DF	VIE	Nguyễn Nhật Minh
28	DF	VIE	Trần Hoàng Phúc
32	GK	VIE	Phan Văn Biểu
33	FW	VIE	Williams Minh Hoàng
34	DF	VIE	Lê Quang Hùng
39	MF	VIE	Nguyễn Đức Phú
56	GK	VIE	Hoa Xuân Tín
58	MF	FRA	Arthur Yamga
89	GK	VIE	Lê Giang Patrik

== Transfers ==
=== In ===
Date	Pos.	Player	From	Fee	Ref.
16 July 2026	GK	(Vietnam) Phan Văn Đức	(Vietnam) Công An Hà Nội	Free	
16 July 2026	FW	(Nigeria) Michael Olaha	(Vietnam) Sông Lam Nghệ An	Free	
20 July 2026	DF	(Belgium) Lenn-Minh Tran	(Netherlands) MVV Maastricht	Undisclosed	
1 August 2026	MF	(Netherlands) Dirk Abels	(Switzerland) Grasshopper	Free	
1 August 2026	GK	(Vietnam) Phan Văn Biểu	(Vietnam) SHB Đà Nẵng	Free	
4 August 2026	MF	(Angola) Aldaír Ferreira	(Romania) Botoșani	Free	
12 August 2026	FW	(Australia) Jason Cummings	(India) Mohun Bagan	Free	
13 August 2026	MF	(Colombia) Juanjo Narváez	(Saudi Arabia) Al Raed	Free	
13 August 2026	DF	(Vietnam) Võ Minh Trọng	(Vietnam) Becamex Hồ Chí Minh City	Undisclosed	
13 August 2026	MF	(Vietnam) Nguyễn Phi Hoàng	(Vietnam) SHB Đà Nẵng	Undisclosed	
26 August 2026	DF	(Vietnam) Đinh Quang Kiệt	(Vietnam) Hoàng Anh Gia Lai	Undisclosed	
26 August 2026	DF	(Vietnam) Nguyễn Nhật Minh	(Vietnam) Hải Phòng	Free	
26 August 2026	MF	(Vietnam) Đặng Văn Trâm	(Vietnam) Thể Công-Viettel	Free	
12 September 2026	MF	(Brazil) Léo Gomes	(Brazil) Ponte Preta	Free	

=== Out ===
Date	Pos.	Player	To	Fee	Ref.
1 July 2026	FW	(Brazil) Raphael Utzig	(Azerbaijan) Zira	Loan return	
1 July 2026	MF	(Vietnam) Phạm Văn Luân	(Vietnam) Công An Hà Nội	Loan return	
1 July 2026	MF	(Vietnam) Mạch Ngọc Hà	(Vietnam) Ninh Bình	Loan return	
1 July 2026	FW	(Vietnam) Đinh Thanh Bình	(Vietnam) Ninh Bình	Loan return	
1 July 2026	MF	(Vietnam) Tẩy Văn Toàn	(Vietnam) PVF-CAND	Loan return	
1 July 2026	MF	(Australia) Peter Makrillos	(Malaysia) Selangor	Free	
1 July 2026	MF	(Malaysia) Endrick	(Malaysia) Star City	Free	
1 July 2026	DF	(Brazil) Matheus Felipe	TBC	Free	
1 July 2026	DF	(Vietnam) Trần Mạnh Cường	TBC	Free	
1 July 2026	FW	(Vietnam) Dương Văn Hào	TBC	Free	
1 July 2026	GK	(Vietnam) Nguyễn Mạnh Cường	TBC	Free	
1 July 2026	MF	(Vietnam) Bùi Ngọc Long	(Vietnam) Hà Nội	Free	
1 July 2026	MF	(Vietnam) Đặng Văn Lắm	TBC	Free	
23 July 2026	MF	(Vietnam) Phạm Đức Huy	TBC	Free	
23 July 2026	MF	(Vietnam) Võ Huy Toàn	TBC	Free	
5 August 2026	DF	(Vietnam) Võ Hữu Việt Hoàng	TBC	Free	

== Pre-season and friendlies ==
Win Draw Loss Fixtures

== Competitions ==
=== Overall record ===
Competition	First match	Last match	Starting round	Final position	Record							
Competition	First match	Last match	Starting round	Final position	Pld	W	D	L	GF	GA	GD	Win %
V.League 1	5 September 2026	22 May 2027	Round 1		8	3	1	4	8	8	+0	37.50
Vietnamese Cup	3 January 2027		Round of 16		0	0	0	0	0	0	+0	—
Vietnamese Super Cup	30 August 2026		Final	Runners-up	1	0	0	1	0	5	−5	0.00
ASEAN Club Championship	7 October 2026		Group stage		2	1	1	0	2	1	+1	50.00
Total					11	4	2	5	10	14	−4	36.36

Last updated: 18 November 2026
Source: Soccerway

=== Vietnamese Super Cup ===
As the defending Vietnamese Cup champions, Công An Hồ Chí Minh City faced the reigning V.League 1 winners Công An Hà Nội in the traditional season opener.

Times are local (UTC+7)

30 August 2026 Final	Cong An Hanoi	5–0	Cong An Ho Chi Minh City	Hanoi
18:00	Alan 8', 27'; Cao Pendant Quang Vinh (yellow card) 35'; Perea 45+3'; Artur (yellow card) 63'; Nguyễn Đình Bắc 69'; Putros 71'	Report	Williams Minh Hoàng (yellow card) 11'; Đào Quốc Gia (yellow card) 88'	Stadium: Hàng Đẫy Stadium; Attendance: 15,120; Referee: Mai Xuân Hùng

=== V.League 1 ===
==== League table ====
Pos	Team	Pld	W	D	L	GF	GA	GD	Pts
7	Hanoi FC	8	4	0	4	11	13	−2	12
8	Haiphong	8	3	1	4	15	14	+1	10
9	Cong An Ho Chi Minh City	8	3	1	4	8	8	0	10
10	SHB Da Nang	8	3	0	5	8	13	−5	9
11	Bac Ninh	7	2	2	3	5	6	−1	8

Updated to match(es) played on 21 November 2026. Source: VPF
Rules for classification: 1) Points; 2) Head-to-head points; 3) Head-to-head goal difference; 4) Head-to-head goals scored; 5) Goal difference; 6) Goals scored; 7) Away goals scored; 8) Disciplinary points.

==== Results summary ====
Overall								Home						Away					
Pld	W	D	L	GF	GA	GD	Pts	W	D	L	GF	GA	GD	W	D	L	GF	GA	GD
8	3	1	4	8	8	0	10	2	0	1	4	2	+2	1	1	3	4	6	−2

Last updated: 22 November 2026.
Source: VPF

==== Results by round ====
Round	1	2	3	4	5	6	7	8	9	10	11	13	12	14	15	16	17	18	19	20	21	22	23	24	25	26
Ground	H	A	A	H	A	H	A	A	H	H	A	A	H	A	H	A	H	A	H	H	A	H	A	H	H	A
Result	W	L	D	W	W	L	L	L																		
Position	3	6	7	5	5	6	7	9																		

Updated to match(es) played on 22 November 2026. Source: VPF
A = Away; H = Home; W = Win; D = Draw; L = Loss

==== Matches ====
The league fixtures were drawn and released on 6 August 2026.

Win Draw Loss Fixtures

5 September 2026 1	Cong An Ho Chi Minh City	3–1	Hanoi FC	Ho Chi Minh City
18:00	Nguyễn Tiến Linh 26'; Nguyễn Thái Quốc Cường 50'; Cummings 82'	Report	Jung 65'	Stadium: Bình Dương Stadium; Attendance: 5,000; Referee: Lê Vũ Linh

11 September 2026 2	Bac Ninh	1–0	Cong An Ho Chi Minh City	Bắc Ninh
18:00	Brenner 18'; Vũ Hồng Quân (yellow card) 45+3'; Nguyễn Chính Đăng (yellow card) 75'; Vitão (yellow card) 77'	Report	Nguyễn Đức Phú (yellow card) 11'; Khổng Minh Gia Bảo (yellow card) 15'; Nguyễn Thái Quốc Cường (yellow card) 90'	Stadium: Việt Yên Stadium; Attendance: 10,000; Referee: Nguyễn Viết Duẩn

11 October 2026 3	Song Lam Nghe An	1–1	Cong An Ho Chi Minh City	Nghệ An
18:00	Lê Văn Quý 54'; Onoja (yellow card) 73'	Report	Gomes (yellow card) 26'; Nguyễn Tiến Linh 29'; Khổng Minh Gia Bảo (yellow card) 52'	Stadium: Vinh Stadium; Attendance: 11,000; Referee: Đỗ Khánh Nam

19 October 2026 4	Cong An Ho Chi Minh City	1–0	The Cong–Viettel	Ho Chi Minh City
18:00	Gomes (yellow card) 35'; Olaha 68'; Nguyễn Đức Phú (red card) 81'	Report	Nguyễn Đức Hoàng Minh (yellow card) 34'; Phan Tuấn Tài (yellow card) 45'	Stadium: Bình Dương Stadium; Attendance: 4,000; Referee: Trần Ngọc Nhớ

25 October 2026 5	Ninh Binh	0–1	Cong An Ho Chi Minh City	Ninh Bình
18:00	Lê Văn Thuận (yellow card) 90+4'	Report	Gomes (yellow card) 76'; Cummings 90+5'; Lê Quang Hùng (yellow card) 90+6'	Stadium: Ninh Bình Stadium; Attendance: 9,000; Referee: Nguyễn Mạnh Hải

1 November 2026 6	Cong An Ho Chi Minh City	0–1	SHB Da Nang	Ho Chi Minh City
18:00	Đào Quốc Gia (yellow card) 21'; Narváez (yellow card) 84'; Đinh Quang Kiệt (yellow card) 90+4'	Report	Fracchia 17'; Võ Nguyên Hoàng (yellow card) 32'; Lê Vũ Quốc Nhật (yellow card) 45'	Stadium: Bình Dương Stadium; Attendance: 8,500; Referee: Ngô Duy Lân

7 November 2026 7	Cong An Hanoi	2–1	Cong An Ho Chi Minh City	Hanoi
19:15	Lê Văn Đô (yellow card) 12'; Alan 58', 81'; Nguyễn Filip (yellow card) 70'; Cao Pendant Quang Vinh (yellow card) 90+5'	Report	Olaha (yellow card) 27'; Williams Minh Hoàng 71' (pen.); Nguyễn Phi Hoàng (yellow card) 75'	Stadium: Hàng Đẫy Stadium; Attendance: 9,000; Referee: Nguyễn Mạnh Hải

22 November 2026 8	Hong Linh Ha Tinh	2–1	Cong An Ho Chi Minh City	Hà Tĩnh
18:00	Passira 51'; Antônio 89'	Report	Olaha Mạnh Đức 57'	Stadium: Hà Tĩnh Stadium; Referee: Nguyễn Viết Duẩn

28 November 2026 9	Cong An Ho Chi Minh City	v	Hoang Anh Gia Lai	Ho Chi Minh City
18:00		Report		Stadium: Bình Dương Stadium

4 December 2026 10	Cong An Ho Chi Minh City	v	Thep Xanh Nam Dinh	Ho Chi Minh City
18:00		Report		Stadium: Bình Dương Stadium

13 December 2026 11	Thanh Hoa	v	Cong An Ho Chi Minh City	Thanh Hóa
17:00		Report		Stadium: Thanh Hóa Stadium

21 December 2026 13	Haiphong	v	Cong An Ho Chi Minh City	Haiphong
18:00		Report		Stadium: Lạch Tray Stadium

25 December 2026 12	Cong An Ho Chi Minh City	v	Dong Nai City	Ho Chi Minh City
18:00		Report		Stadium: Bình Dương Stadium

February 2027 14	The Cong–Viettel	v	Cong An Ho Chi Minh City	Hanoi
19:15		Report		Stadium: Mỹ Đình Stadium

February 2027 15	Cong An Ho Chi Minh City	v	Song Lam Nghe An	Ho Chi Minh City
18:00		Report		Stadium: Thống Nhất Stadium

March 2027 16	Dong Nai City	v	Cong An Ho Chi Minh City	Đồng Nai
18:00		Report		Stadium: Bình Phước Stadium

March 2027 17	Cong An Ho Chi Minh City	v	Haiphong	Ho Chi Minh City
18:00		Report		Stadium: Thống Nhất Stadium

March 2027 18	Hoang Anh Gia Lai	v	Cong An Ho Chi Minh City	Gia Lai
18:00		Report		Stadium: Pleiku Stadium

April 2027 19	Cong An Ho Chi Minh City	v	Hong Linh Ha Tinh	Ho Chi Minh City
18:00		Report		Stadium: Thống Nhất Stadium

April 2027 20	Cong An Ho Chi Minh City	v	Cong An Hanoi	Ho Chi Minh City
18:00		Report		Stadium: Thống Nhất Stadium

April 2027 21	SHB Da Nang	v	Cong An Ho Chi Minh City	Đà Nẵng
18:00		Report		Stadium: Chi Lăng Stadium

April 2027 22	Cong An Ho Chi Minh City	v	Ninh Binh	Ho Chi Minh City
18:00		Report		Stadium: Thống Nhất Stadium

May 2027 23	Thep Xanh Nam Dinh	v	Cong An Ho Chi Minh City	Ninh Bình
18:00		Report		Stadium: Thiên Trường Stadium

May 2027 24	Cong An Ho Chi Minh City	v	Thanh Hoa	Ho Chi Minh City
18:00		Report		Stadium: Thống Nhất Stadium

May 2027 25	Cong An Ho Chi Minh City	v	Bac Ninh	Ho Chi Minh City
18:00		Report		Stadium: Thống Nhất Stadium

22 May 2027 26	Hanoi FC	v	Cong An Ho Chi Minh City	Hanoi
19:15		Report		Stadium: Hàng Đẫy Stadium

=== Vietnamese Cup ===
Win Draw Loss Fixtures

3 January 2027 Round of 16	Cong An Ho Chi Minh City	v	Becamex Ho Chi Minh City	Ho Chi Minh City
18:00		Report		Stadium: Bình Dương Stadium

=== ASEAN Club Championship ===
==== Group A table ====
The group stage draw was held on 5 June 2026.

As the champions of the Vietnamese Cup, Công An Hồ Chí Minh City entered the ASEAN Club Championship in the group stage.

Pos	Team	Pld	W	D	L	GF	GA	GD	Pts	Qualification	TAM	CHC	BOR	KUC	RBM	BRU	MDF
1	(Singapore) Tampines Rovers	2	1	1	0	5	4	+1	4	Advance to knockout stage	—	9 Dec	—	—	3–2	—	24 Feb
2	(Vietnam) Công An Hồ Chí Minh City	2	1	1	0	2	1	+1	4	Advance to knockout stage	—	—	24 Feb	16 Dec	—	1–0	—
3	(Indonesia) Borneo	2	1	1	0	1	0	+1	4	Advance to knockout stage	3 Mar	—	—	—	16 Dec	—	1–0
4	(Malaysia) Kuching City	1	0	1	0	2	2	0	1	Advance to knockout stage	2–2	—	9 Dec	—	—	24 Feb	—
5	(Thailand) Ratchaburi	2	0	1	1	3	4	−1	1		—	1–1	—	31 Mar	—	—	9 Dec
6	(Thailand) Buriram United	2	0	1	1	0	1	−1	1		31 Mar	—	0–0	—	3 Mar	—	—
7	(Philippines) Manila Digger	1	0	0	1	0	1	−1	0		—	31 Mar	—	3 Mar	—	16 Dec	—

Updated to match(es) played on 18 November 2026. Source: ASEAN United
Rules for classification: Tiebreakers

===== Results by round =====
Round	1	2	3	4	5	6
Ground	A	H	A	H	H	H
Result	D	W				
Position	3	2				
Points	1	4				

Updated to match(es) played on 18 November 2026. Source: ASEAN United FC
A = Away; H = Home; W = Win; D = Draw; L = Loss; P = Postponed

===== Matches =====
Win Draw Loss Fixtures

7 October 2026 1	Ratchaburi (Thailand)	1–1	(Vietnam) Công An Hồ Chí Minh City	Ratchaburi, Thailand
19:00 UTC+7	Allardice 90+2'; Nontasila (yellow card) 90+5'	Report	Võ Minh Trọng (yellow card) 2'; Olaha 48'	Stadium: Ratchaburi Stadium; Attendance: 1,609; Referee: Mohamed Al-Harmoodi (United Arab Emirates)

19 November 2026 2	Công An Hồ Chí Minh City (Vietnam)	1–0	(Thailand) Buriram United	Ho Chi Minh City, Vietnam
19:30 UTC+7	Đào Quốc Gia (yellow card) 82'; Nguyễn Thái Quốc Cường 88', (yellow card) 89'	Report	Hemviboon (yellow card) 26'; Sukjitthammakul (yellow card) 57'	Stadium: Bình Dương Stadium; Attendance: 7,168; Referee: Nazmi Nasaruddin (Malaysia)

9 December 2026 3	BG Tampines Rovers (Singapore)	v	(Vietnam) Công An Hồ Chí Minh City	Kallang, Singapore
19:30 UTC+7		Report		Stadium: Jalan Besar Stadium

16 December 2026 4	Công An Hồ Chí Minh City (Vietnam)	v	(Malaysia) Kuching City	Ho Chi Minh City, Vietnam
19:30 UTC+7		Report		Stadium: Bình Dương Stadium

24 February 2027 5	Công An Hồ Chí Minh City (Vietnam)	v	(Indonesia) Borneo	Ho Chi Minh City, Vietnam
19:30 UTC+7		Report		Stadium: Thống Nhất Stadium

31 March 2027 6	Manila Digger (Philippines)	v	(Vietnam) Công An Hồ Chí Minh City	Manila, Phlippines
20:30 UTC+8 (19:30 UTC+7)		Report		Stadium: Rizal Memorial Stadium

== Statistics ==
=== Appearances and goals ===
As of match played 22 November 2026

Players with no appearances are not included on the list, Italics indicate a loaned in player

No.	Pos	Nat	Player	Total		V.League 1		Vietnamese Cup		Vietnamese Super Cup		ASEAN Club Championship	
No.	Pos	Nat	Player	Apps	Goals	Apps	Goals	Apps	Goals	Apps	Goals	Apps	Goals
2	DF	(Belgium) BEL	Lenn-Minh Tran	6	0	2+2	0	0+0	0	1+0	0	1+0	0
4	DF	(Netherlands) NED	Dirk Abels	3	0	2+0	0	0+0	0	1+0	0	0+0	0
5	DF	(Vietnam) VIE	Đinh Quang Kiệt	8	0	6+0	0	0+0	0	0+0	0	2+0	0
7	DF	(Vietnam) VIE	Olaha Mạnh Đức	10	3	7+0	2	0+0	0	1+0	0	2+0	1
8	MF	(Colombia) COL	Juanjo Narváez	9	0	2+5	0	0+0	0	0+0	0	2+0	0
9	FW	(Australia) AUS	Jason Cummings	7	2	4+1	2	0+0	0	1+0	0	1+0	0
10	MF	(Angola) ANG	Aldaír Ferreira	9	0	5+1	0	0+0	0	1+0	0	2+0	0
11	MF	(Vietnam) VIE	Nguyễn Phi Hoàng	6	0	2+3	0	0+0	0	1+0	0	0+0	0
12	MF	(Brazil) BRA	Léo Gomes	6	0	3+1	0	0+0	0	0+0	0	1+1	0
13	DF	(Vietnam) VIE	Khổng Minh Gia Bảo	7	0	5+0	0	0+0	0	1+0	0	1+0	0
17	DF	(Vietnam) VIE	Võ Minh Trọng	5	0	4+0	0	0+0	0	0+0	0	1+0	0
19	MF	(Vietnam) VIE	Nguyễn Thái Quốc Cường	11	2	8+0	1	0+0	0	1+0	0	1+1	1
20	FW	(Vietnam) VIE	Phan Văn Đức	3	0	0+1	0	0+0	0	1+0	0	0+1	0
21	MF	(Vietnam) VIE	Đào Quốc Gia	5	0	2+1	0	0+0	0	1+0	0	0+1	0
22	FW	(Vietnam) VIE	Nguyễn Tiến Linh	9	2	5+2	2	0+0	0	1+0	0	1+0	0
26	FW	(Vietnam) VIE	Ngô Đăng Khoa	8	0	2+4	0	0+0	0	0+0	0	0+2	0
27	DF	(Vietnam) VIE	Nguyễn Nhật Minh	11	0	5+3	0	0+0	0	1+0	0	1+1	0
28	DF	(Vietnam) VIE	Trần Hoàng Phúc	8	0	2+3	0	0+0	0	1+0	0	1+1	0
33	MF	(Vietnam) VIE	Williams Minh Hoàng	8	1	3+4	1	0+0	0	1+0	0	0+0	0
34	DF	(Vietnam) VIE	Lê Quang Hùng	5	0	4+0	0	0+0	0	0+0	0	1+0	0
39	MF	(Vietnam) VIE	Nguyễn Đức Phú	7	0	4+1	0	0+0	0	1+0	0	1+0	0
58	MF	(France) FRA	Arthur Yamga	7	0	3+2	0	0+0	0	0+0	0	2+0	0
69	MF	(Vietnam) VIE	Nguyễn Thái Quốc Cường	1	0	0+0	0	0+0	0	1+0	0	0+0	0
89	GK	(Vietnam) VIE	Lê Giang Patrik	10	0	8+0	0	0+0	0	1+0	0	1+0	0
