= 2026 Vietnamese Super Cup =

Siêu Cúp bóng đá Quốc gia 2025/26 – Cúp THACO
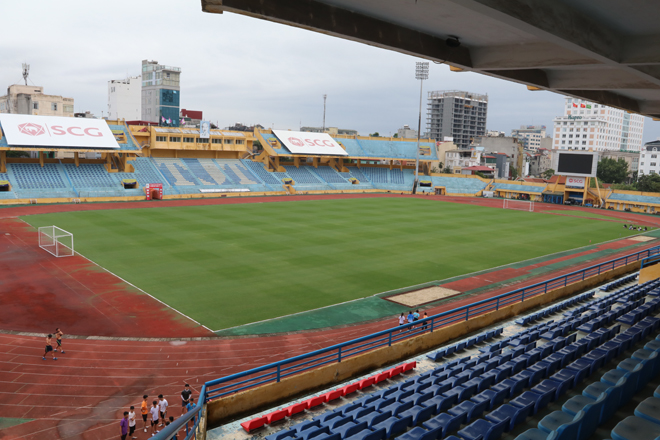
- The match took place at Hàng Đẫy Stadium.
- Event: Vietnamese Super Cup
Cong An Hanoi	Cong An Ho Chi Minh City
5	0
- Date: 30 August 2026
- Venue: Hàng Đẫy Stadium, Hanoi
- Man of the Match: Alan Grafite (Cong An Hanoi)
- Referee: Mai Xuân Hùng
- Attendance: 15,120
- Weather: Cloudy; 30 °C (86 °F); 84% humidity

The 2026 Vietnamese Super Cup (Vietnamese: Siêu Cúp bóng đá Quốc gia 2026, lit. '2026 National Football Super Cup'), also known as 2025–26 Vietnamese Super Cup - THACO Cup (Vietnamese: Siêu Cúp bóng đá Quốc gia 2025/26 – Cúp THACO, lit. '2025/26 National Football Super Cup – THACO Cup') was the 27th edition of the Vietnamese Super Cup, organized by Vietnam Professional Football (VPF), played on 30 August 2026.

The match featured Cong An Hanoi, winners of 2025–26 V.League 1 against the winners of the 2025–26 Vietnamese Cup, Cong An Ho Chi Minh City. This was the first match against two Police football teams in the Vietnamese Super Cup.

Cong An Hanoi won their second Super Cup title in a row after defeating Cong An Ho Chi Minh City 5–0.

== Teams ==
Team	Qualification	Previous appearances (bold indicates winners)
Cong An Ho Chi Minh City	2025–26 Vietnamese Cup winners	3 (2000, 2002, 2019)
Cong An Hanoi	2025–26 V.League 1 champions	2 (2023, **2025**)

== Background ==
Cong An Hanoi and Cong An Ho Chi Minh City qualified for the 2026 Vietnamese Super Cup as the winners of the 2025–26 V.League 1 and the 2025–26 Vietnamese Cup, respectively. Cong An Hanoi won the most recent match between the two teams, winning 3–0 over Cong An Ho Chi Minh City on 19 April 2026. Cong An Hanoi have previously appeared in 2 Super Cup matches, winning one title, and appeared in the most recent edition in 2025, where they beat Thep Xanh Nam Dinh 3–2. Cong An Ho Chi Minh City have previously appeared in three Super Cup matches, has not won any titles yet, and appeared most recently in the 2019 edition.

== Match ==
Times are local (UTC+7)

=== Details ===
30 August 2026
18:00

Cong An Hanoi	5–0	Cong An Ho Chi Minh City
Alan 8', 27'; Perea 45+3'; Nguyễn Đình Bắc 69'; Putros 71'	Report

Hàng Đẫy Stadium, Hanoi
Attendance: 15,120
Referee: Mai Xuân Hùng

**Cong An Hanoi**	**Cong An Ho Chi Minh City**

GK	1	(Vietnam) Nguyễn Filip
CB	93	(France) Kevin Pham Ba		(substituted off) 64'
CB	68	(Vietnam) Bùi Hoàng Việt Anh		(substituted off) 77'
CB	38	(France) Leygley Adou
RM	88	(Vietnam) Lê Văn Đô		(substituted off) 64'
CM	11	(Vietnam) Lê Phạm Thành Long		(substituted off) 64'
CM	6	(Australia) Stefan Mauk
LM	7	(Vietnam) Cao Pendant Quang Vinh	(yellow card) 35'
LW	10	(Brazil) Léo Artur (c)	(yellow card) 63'
CF	72	(Brazil) Alan Grafite		(substituted off) 64'
RW	90	(Colombia) Brayan Perea
Substitutes:
GK	23	(Vietnam) Vũ Thành Vinh
DF	5	(Vietnam) Đoàn Văn Hậu		(substituted on) 64'
FW	8	(Togo) David Henen
FW	9	(Vietnam) Nguyễn Đình Bắc		(substituted on) 64'
MF	12	(Vietnam) Hoàng Văn Toản		(substituted on) 77'
MF	14	(Spain) Damià Sabater
MF	19	(Vietnam) Nguyễn Quang Hải		(substituted on) 64'
DF	26	(Vietnam) Hà Văn Phương
DF	55	(Iraq) Frans Putros		(substituted on) 64'
Manager:
(Brazil) Alexandré Pölking

GK	89	(Vietnam) Lê Giang Patrik (c)
RB	2	(Belgium) Lenn-Minh Tran
CB	13	(Vietnam) Khổng Minh Gia Bảo		(substituted off) 81'
CB	4	(Netherlands) Dirk Abels
LB	11	(Vietnam) Nguyễn Phi Hoàng		(substituted off) 39'
CM	19	(Vietnam) Nguyễn Thái Quốc Cường
CM	28	(Vietnam) Trần Hoàng Phúc
RW	33	(England) Lee Williams	(yellow card) 11'	(substituted off) 62'
AM	10	(Angola) Aldaír Ferreira		(substituted off) 46'
LW	7	(Nigeria) Michael Olaha
CF	22	(Vietnam) Nguyễn Tiến Linh		(substituted off) 62'
Substitutes:
GK	32	(Vietnam) Phan Văn Biểu
DF	16	(Vietnam) Nguyễn Hoàng Minh Nhật
DF	27	(Vietnam) Nguyễn Nhật Minh		(substituted on) 39'
MF	6	(Vietnam) Đặng Văn Trâm
MF	21	(Vietnam) Đào Quốc Gia	(yellow card) 88'	(substituted on) 62'
FW	26	(Australia) Khoa Ngo
MF	39	(Vietnam) Nguyễn Đức Phú		(substituted on) 46'
FW	9	(Australia) Jason Cummings		(substituted on) 62'
FW	20	(Vietnam) Phan Văn Đức		(substituted on) 81'
Manager:
(Australia) Arthur Diles

Man of the Match:
Alan Grafite (Cong An Hanoi)

Assistant referees:
Trần Duy Khánh
Nguyễn Trung Việt
Fourth official:
Nguyễn Mạnh Hải
Video assistant referee:
Lê Vũ Linh
Assistant video assistant referee:
Đỗ Khánh Nam

**Match rules**

- 90 minutes
- Penalty shoot-out if scores level
- Maximum of nine named substitutes
- Maximum of five substitutions
- Maximum of three substitution opportunities

== Broadcasting ==
The match was broadcast on FPT Play, MyTV, FPT Bóng Đá Việt YouTube channel on YouTube and VTV6.

== See also ==
- 2025–26 V.League 1
- 2025–26 Vietnamese Cup
