= 2026 Vietnamese Cup final =

Chung kết Cúp Quốc gia Chứng Khoán LPBank 2025/26
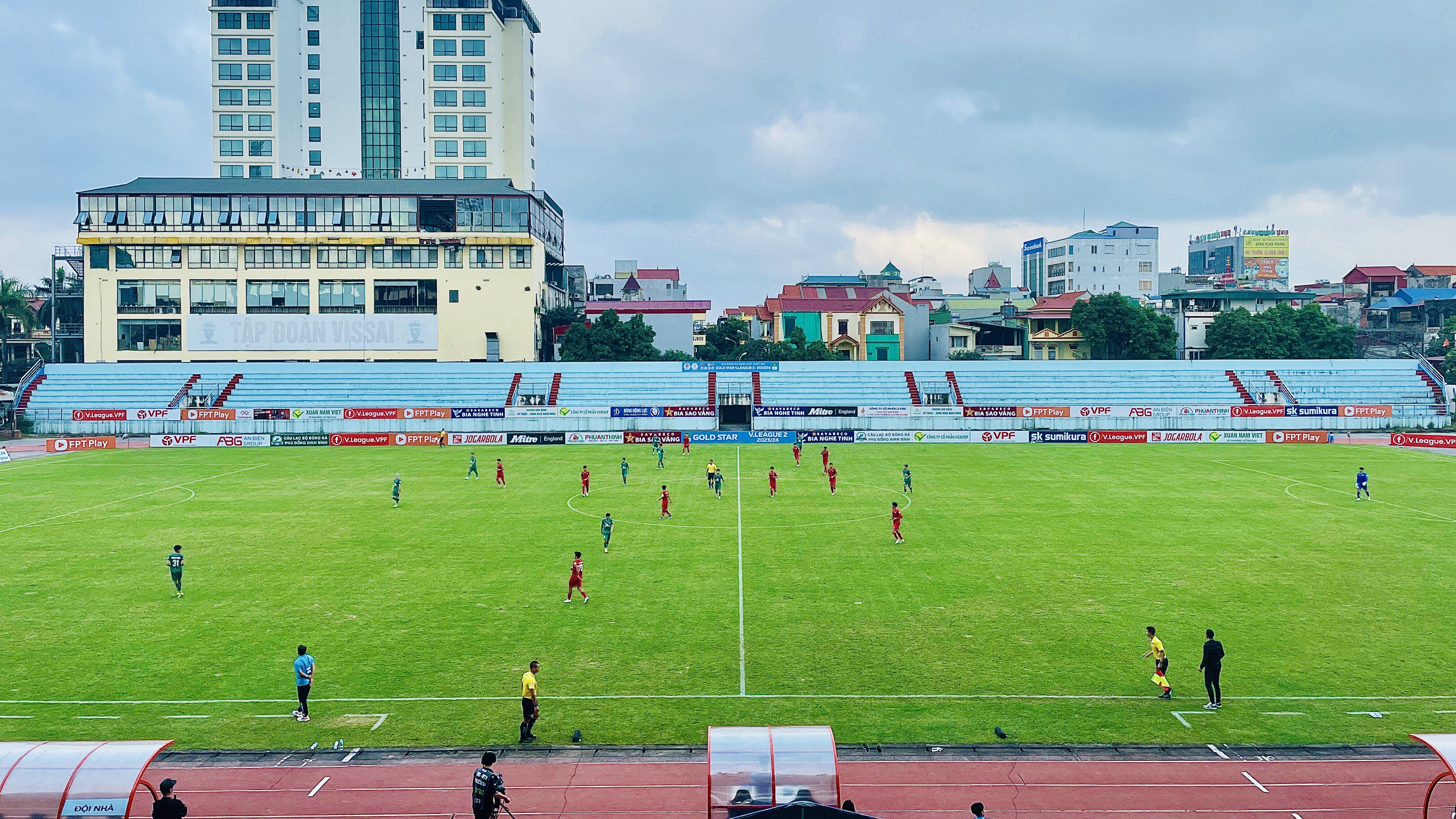
- The match took place at Ninh Bình Stadium.
- Event: 2025–26 Vietnamese Cup
Ninh Binh	Cong An Ho Chi Minh City
1	2
- Date: 14 June 2026
- Venue: Ninh Bình Stadium, Ninh Bình
- Referee: Muhammad Taqi (Singapore)
- Attendance: 12,000
- Weather: Cloudy; 33 °C (91 °F); 66% humidity

The 2026 Vietnamese Cup final (Vietnamese: Chung kết Cúp Quốc gia Chứng Khoán LPBank 2025/26, lit. 'LPBank Securities National Cup Final 2025/26') was a football match played at Ninh Bình Stadium in Ninh Bình, Vietnam, on 14 June 2026 between Ninh Binh and Cong An Ho Chi Minh City to determine the winners of the 2025–26 Vietnamese Cup. It was the 32nd final of Vietnamse football's primary cup competition, the Vietnamese National Football Cup.

Ninh Binh and Cong An Ho Chi Minh City played their 1st and 6th final in the Vietnamese Cup, as they were seeking their first and third title, respectively.

Cong An Ho Chi Minh City won their record-extending 3rd Vietnamese Cup title after winning 2–1 against Ninh Binh. As 2025–26 Vietnamese Cup, Cong An Ho Chi Minh City qualified for the 2026 Vietnamese Super Cup and 2026–27 ASEAN Club Championship.

== Route to the final ==
=== Ninh Binh ===
Ninh Binh's route to the final
Round	Opposition	Score
QR	Xuan Thien Phu Tho (A)	4–2
R16	Haiphong (A)	2–1
QF	PVF-CAND (H)	3–2
SF	The Cong–Viettel (H)	4–1
Key: (H) = Home venue; (A) = Away venue

As a newly promoted V.League 1 team, Ninh Binh entered the tournament in the qualifying round, beginning their Vietnamese Cup campaign with a 4–2 away victory over V.League 2 side Xuan Thien Phu Tho. Lê Hải Đức, Geovane Magno, and Nguyễn Hoàng Đức scored during the match. In the round of 16, Ninh Binh faced Haiphong, Haiphong played tough in the first half due to home advantage, in which Nguyễn Hữu Nam led the team 1–0 from the score. Thanks to their own goal from Nguyễn Hữu Thái Bảo in the second half, Daniel was able to score the final-minute goal.

In the quarter-finals, Ninh Binh faced a tougher opponent, PVF-CAND, an own goal from Nguyễn Văn Dũng and a goal from Geovane led the team 1–0 and 2–1, but was quickly equalized by Mahmoud Eid and Nguyễn Vũ Tín. An injury time goal from Phạm Gia Hưng managed to end this draw. Ninh Binh faced 2025–26 V.League 1 runners-up, The Cong–Viettel in the semi-finals, four goals from Phạm Gia Hưng, Nguyễn Hoàng Đức, Trần Bảo Toàn, and Fred Friday made Ninh Binh win to seal the 4–1 victory and sending them to the Vietnamese Cup finals, where they would seek their first title.

=== Cong An Ho Chi Minh City ===
CAHCMC's route to the final
Round	Opposition	Score
R16	Ho Chi Minh City (H)	3–0
QF	Truong Tuoi Dong Nai (H)	1–0
SF	Thep Xanh Nam Dinh (A)	4–2
Key: (H) = Home venue; (A) = Away venue

Cong An Ho Chi Minh City were drawn against either Ho Chi Minh City and Dong Thap from the qualifying round. After Ho Chi Minh City's 1–0 win against Dong Thap, CAHCMC officially started their campaign by winning 3–0 against HCMCFC, with goals from Nguyễn Tiến Linh, Lee Williams, and a penalty-goal from Endrick. Cong An Ho Chi Minh City faced V.League 2 side Truong Tuoi Dong Nai in the quarter-finals, where the lone penalty-goal from Khoa Ngo send the team to the semi-finals.

In the semi-finals, CAHCMC faced Thep Xanh Nam Dinh in the away venue, Thiên Trường Stadium. A 4-leading-goal from Raphael Utzig, Matheus Felipe, Lee Williams, and Khổng Minh Gia Bảo, with 2 consolation goals from Nguyễn Xuân Son and Lý Công Hoàng Anh made Cong An Ho Chi Minh City won 4–2 against Thep Xanh Nam Dinh, sending the team to the Vietnamese Cup finals for the first time since their last final as Cảng Sài Gòn in 2000, where they would seek their third title.

== Match ==
=== Summary ===
Ninh Binh kicked off around 18:00, in front of an official attendance of 12,000. Ninh Binh started proactively, quickly creating significant pressure on the opponent's goal. In the 5th minute, Trần Bảo Toàn had a very good opportunity after a cross from Nguyễn Hoàng Đức but failed to capitalize. In the 16th minute, Võ Minh Trọng took the first corner kick for the home team, "drawing" a perfect curve and giving Raphael Utzig leap the ball into the net, giving CAHCMC a 1–0 lead. 18 minutes later, Hoàng Đức tried to tighten their formation to find a way to equalize the score, but a mistake in losing possession in midfield caused Lee Williams to increase the score to 2–0.

In the 71st minute, Gustavo Henrique was fouled by Trần Mạnh Cường inside the penalty area causing referee Muhammad Taqi to point out the penalty spot. 3 minutes after the video assistant referee (VAR) check, Geovane Magno later beaten the shot from Patrik Le Giang, reducing the score to 1–2.

=== Details ===
14 June 2026
18:00

Ninh Binh	1–2	Cong An Ho Chi Minh City
Geovane 74' (pen.)	Report	Utzig 16'; Williams 34'

Ninh Bình Stadium, Ninh Bình
Attendance: 12,000
Referee: Muhammad Taqi (Singapore)

Ninh Binh	Cong An Ho Chi Minh City

GK	1	(Vietnam) Đặng Văn Lâm
RB	66	(Vietnam) Trương Tiến Anh
CB	7	(Vietnam) Nguyễn Đức Chiến
CB	17	(Vietnam) Lê Ngọc Bảo
LB	6	(Vietnam) Đỗ Thanh Thịnh	(yellow card) 45+4'	(substituted off) 82'
RM	99	(Vietnam) Nguyễn Quốc Việt
CM	86	(Vietnam) Dụng Quang Nho	(yellow card) 65'
CM	28	(Vietnam) Nguyễn Hoàng Đức (c)		(substituted off) 82'
LM	15	(Vietnam) Trần Bảo Toàn		(substituted off) 42'
CF	5	(Nigeria) Fred Friday		(substituted off) 90'
CF	18	(Vietnam) Phạm Gia Hưng		(substituted off) 45'
Substitutes:
GK	25	(Vietnam) Quàng Thế Tài
DF	2	(Vietnam) Hoàng Thái Bình		(substituted on) 82'
DF	26	(Vietnam) Lê Hải Đức
MF	8	(Vietnam) Trần Thành Trung
MF	11	(Vietnam) Lê Văn Thuận		(substituted on) 82'
MF	29	(Vietnam) Nguyễn Trọng Long
MF	94	(Brazil) Geovane Magno		(substituted on) 42'
FW	16	(Vietnam) Nguyễn Lê Phát		(substituted on) 90'
FW	68	(Brazil) Gustavo Henrique		(substituted on) 45'
Manager:
(Vietnam) Chu Đình Nghiêm

GK	89	(Slovakia) Patrik Le Giang (c)	(yellow card) 87'
RB	34	(Vietnam) Lê Quang Hùng		(substituted off) 64'
CB	4	(Brazil) Matheus Felipe	(yellow card) 66'
CB	13	(Vietnam) Khổng Minh Gia Bảo
LB	17	(Vietnam) Võ Minh Trọng
CM	19	(Vietnam) Nguyễn Thái Quốc Cường		(substituted off) 69'
CM	39	(Vietnam) Nguyễn Đức Phú		(substituted off) 86'
CM	14	(Malaysia) Endrick
RW	26	(Australia) Khoa Ngo
CF	66	(England) Lee Williams	(yellow card) 26'	(substituted off) 86'
LW	10	(Brazil) Raphael Utzig	(yellow card) 86'	(substituted off) 86'
Substitutes:
GK	67	(Vietnam) Nguyễn Mạnh Cường
DF	6	(Vietnam) Võ Huy Toàn
DF	28	(Vietnam) Trần Hoàng Phúc
DF	90	(Vietnam) Trần Mạnh Cường		(substituted on) 64'
MF	15	(Vietnam) Phạm Đức Huy
MF	18	(Vietnam) Bùi Ngọc Long		(substituted on) 86'
MF	21	(Vietnam) Đào Quốc Gia		(substituted on) 69'
MF	7	(Australia) Peter Makrillos		(substituted on) 86'
FW	22	(Vietnam) Nguyễn Tiến Linh		(substituted on) 86'
Manager:
(Vietnam) Phùng Thanh Phương

Assistant referees:
Trần Duy Khánh
Phạm Huy Hoàng
Fourth official:
Ngô Duy Lân
Video assistant referee:
Ahmad A'Qashah (Singapore)
Assistant video assistant referee:
Nguyễn Trung Hậu

Match rules

- 90 minutes
- Penalty shoot-out if scores still level
- Five to nine named substitutes
- Maximum of five substitutions
