= 2026–27 Vietnamese Cup =

SACOMBANK Vietnamese Cup

Tournament details
- Country: Vietnam
- Dates: 18 September 2026 – 16 May 2027
- Teams: 27

Tournament statistics
- Matches played: 11
- Goals scored: 33 (3 per match)
- Attendance: 21,000 (1,909 per match)
- Top goal scorer(s): Brenner (3 goal)
- All statistics correct as of 6 October 2026. Goals scored in penalty shoot-outs not included.

The 2026–27 Vietnamese Cup (Vietnamese: Giải bóng đá Cúp Quốc gia 2026/27, lit. 'National Cup Football Tournament 2026/27'), also known as 2026–27 SACOMBANK National Cup for sponsorship reasons (Vietnamese: Giải bóng đá Cúp Quốc gia SACOMBANK 2026/27), is the 35th season of the annual Vietnamese football cup competition. Twenty-seven teams participate in the competition, including all teams from the previous year's V.League 1 and 13 teams from V.League 2. The competition began on 18 September 2026 with the qualifying round and will end on 16 May 2027 with the second leg of the finals.

Three-time winners and defending champions, Cong An Ho Chi Minh City will enter the competition after defeating Ninh Binh in the final.

== Background ==
The Vietnamese Cup is a knockout competition with 27 teams taking part from the first round proper, and all trying to reach the final on 30 May 2027. The tournament consists of 14 teams from V.League 1 and 12 teams from V.League 2 to compete.

Thai Nguyen did not enter the cup competition the team had the same owner as Hanoi FC, the Hanoi T&T Sports Joint Stock Company at the moment of the competition's registration deadline.

Two-legged ties will be returned this season for the semi-finals and the finals. This is the first time since 2018 that the cup freatured two-legged ties, and the first time since 2017 that the cup winners will be decided by this format.

Round	Main date	Number of fixtures	Clubs remaining	New entries this round	Winner prize money (VND)
Qualifying round	18 September – 6 October 2026	9	22 → 11		10,000,000₫
Round of 16	2–19 January 2026	8	11+5 → 8	5 V.League 1 teams entered directly from the Round of 16	20,000,000₫
Quarter-finals	29–31 January 2027	4	8 → 4		30,000,000₫
Semi-finals	14–18 April 2027	4	4 → 2		400,000,000₫ (Note: Semi-finalist only)
Finals	13–16 May 2027	2	2 → 1		2,000,000,000₫

== Matches ==
All times are local (UTC+7)

=== Qualifying round ===
The draw took place alongside the round of 16 on 6 August 2026. The matches took place between 18 September and 6 October 2026.

Number of teams per tier still in competition
V.League 1	V.League 2	Total
14 / 14	13 / 13	27 / 27

18 September 2026	Quy Nhon United (2)	1–1 (3–4 p)	Ho Chi Minh City FC (2)	Gia Lai
18:00	Đào Gia Việt 43'	Report	Lynch 56'	Stadium: Quy Nhơn Stadium; Attendance: 1,000; Referee: Lê Ngọc Lợi
	Penalties
	Lê Thanh Phong (penalty scored); Đào Gia Việt (penalty scored); Nguyễn Thanh Thụ (penalty missed); Nguyễn Anh Tuấn (penalty scored); Trần Văn Thái (penalty missed)		(penalty scored) Tô Phương Thịnh; (penalty scored) Vũ Đức Duy; (penalty scored) Nguyễn Hồng Quang; (penalty scored) Nguyễn Quốc Hoàng

19 September 2026	Long An (2)	2–3	Bac Ninh (1)	Tây Ninh
16:00	Romário 53', 68'	Report	Brenner 5', 45+1', 51'	Stadium: Long An Stadium; Attendance: 1,000; Referee: Phan Văn Tuấn

19 September 2026	Khatoco Khanh Hoa (2)	1–1 (2–3 p)	Van Hien University (2)	Khánh Hòa
17:00	Namli 3'	Report	Trần Văn Tùng 56'	Stadium: Nha Trang Stadium; Attendance: 700; Referee: Khổng Tam Cường
	Penalties
	Trương Văn Thái Quý (penalty missed); Namli (penalty scored); Nguyễn Trọng Nam (penalty scored); Đinh Quý (penalty scored)		(penalty scored) Ngô Hoàng Anh; (penalty missed) Huỳnh Nhật Tân; (penalty missed) Trần Vương; (penalty scored) Nguyễn Đình Mạnh; (penalty missed) Trịnh Văn Quang

19 September 2026	Thanh Hoa (1)	0–2	Becamex Ho Chi Minh City (2)	Thanh Hóa
17:00		Report	dos Anjos 35'; Nguyễn Trần Việt Cường 82'	Stadium: Thanh Hóa Stadium; Attendance: 2,000; Referee: Trần Thế Anh

20 September 2026	Hoang Anh Gia Lai (1)	2–3	Hung Yen (2)	Gia Lai
17:00	Lucas 61', 90+4'	Report	Nguyễn Đăng Dương 55'; Joseph 74', 77'	Stadium: Quy Nhơn Stadium; Attendance: 1,500; Referee: Trần Ngọc Nhớ

20 September 2026	Xuan Thien Phu Tho (2)	0–0 (3–2 p)	Hong Linh Ha Tinh (1)	Phú Thọ
18:00		Report		Stadium: Việt Trì Stadium; Attendance: 1,000; Referee: Nguyễn Hồng Phúc
	Penalties
	Hoàng Xuân Tân (penalty scored); Đặng Ngọc Đức (penalty missed); Nguyễn Văn Thủy (penalty scored); Võ Tiến Thắng (penalty missed); Trần Mạnh Hùng (penalty scored)		(penalty missed) Atshimene; (penalty scored) Ngô Văn Lương; (penalty scored) Thái Bá Sang; (penalty missed) Võ Quốc Dân; (penalty missed) Trần Phi Sơn

20 September 2026	Haiphong (1)	0–1	Thep Can Tho (2)	Haiphong
18:00		Report	Tháileon 45'	Stadium: Lạch Tray Stadium; Attendance: 2,500; Referee: Vũ Văn Điển

20 September 2026	Hanoi FC (1)	1–1 (3–4 p)	SHB Da Nang (1)	Hanoi
19:15	Jung 28'	Report	Luong 19'	Stadium: Hàng Đẫy Stadium; Attendance: 4,500; Referee: Bùi Trung Dũng
	Penalties
	Taggart (penalty missed); Faurand-Tournaire (penalty scored); Trần Văn Thắng (penalty scored); Sade (penalty scored); Đỗ Hoàng Hên (penalty missed)		(penalty scored) Šaponjić; (penalty scored) Phan Văn Long; (penalty scored) Fracchia; (penalty scored) Calleros

6 October 2026	Lam Dong (2)	0–2	Song Lam Nghe An (1)	Lâm Đồng
15:30		Report	Đặng Văn Lắm 85'; Bruno 90+4'	Stadium: Đà Lạt Stadium; Attendance: 3,000; Referee: Nguyễn Nhựt Quang

6 October 2026	Dong Nai City (1)	4–3	Aurora Saigon United (2)	Đồng Nai
18:00	Lưu Tự Nhân 16'; Nguyễn Công Phượng 49'; Nguyễn Quốc Lộc 56'; Ivan 76'	Report	Bùi Duy Nam 23'; Nguyễn Hoàng Quốc Chí 33'; Jok 64'	Stadium: Bình Phước Stadium; Attendance: 3,000; Referee: Phạm Anh Đại

6 October 2026	Cong An Nhan Dan (2)	4–1	Hue (2)	Hưng Yên
18:00	Trần Minh Vương 23'; Gustavo 31'; Gonzalo 50'; Thái Bá Đạt 65'	Report	Dương Anh Vũ 86'	Stadium: PVF Stadium; Attendance: 800; Referee: Dương Duy Dũng

=== Round of 16 ===
The draw took place alongside the qualifying round on 6 August 2026. The matches will take place between 2 and 16 January 2027.

Number of teams per tier still in competition
V.League 1	V.League 2	Total
9 / 14	7 / 13	16 / 27

2 January 2027	Thep Xanh Nam Dinh (1)	v	Xuan Thien Phu Tho (2)	Ninh Bình
18:00		Report		Stadium: Thiên Trường Stadium

2 January 2027	Bac Ninh (1)	v	Van Hien University (2)	Bắc Ninh
18:00		Report		Stadium: Việt Yên Stadium

2 January 2027	Song Lam Nghe An (1)	v	Cong An Nhan Dan (2)	Nghệ An
18:00		Report		Stadium: Vinh Stadium

3 January 2027	Ninh Binh (1)	v	Hung Yen (2)	Ninh Bình
18:00		Report		Stadium: Ninh Bình Stadium

3 January 2027	SHB Da Nang (1)	v	Thep Can Tho (2)	Đà Nẵng
18:00		Report		Stadium: Chi Lăng

3 January 2027	Cong An Ho Chi Minh City (1)	v	Becamex Ho Chi Minh City (2)	Ho Chi Minh City
18:00		Report		Stadium: Thống Nhất Stadium

3 January 2027	Thể Công–Viettel (1)	v	Ho Chi Minh City FC (2)	Hanoi
19:15		Report		Stadium: Hàng Đẫy Stadium

19 January 2027	Cong An Hanoi (1)	v	Dong Nai City (1)	Hanoi
19:15		Report		Stadium: Hàng Đẫy Stadium

== Bracket ==
Qualifying round
6 October 2026; Bình Phước
2	Dong Nai City	4
3	Aurora Saigon United	3
19 September 2026; Long An
4	Long An	2
5	Bac Ninh	3
19 September 2026; Nha Trang
6	Khatoco Khanh Hoa	1 (2)
7	Van Hien University	1 (3)
19 September 2026; Thanh Hóa
9	Thanh Hoa	0
10	Becamex Ho Chi Minh City	2
18 September 2026; Quy Nhơn
12	Quy Nhon United	1 (3)
13	Ho Chi Minh City FC	1 (4)
20 September 2026; Việt Trì
15	Xuan Thien Phu Tho	0 (3)
16	Hong Linh Ha Tinh	0 (2)
20 September 2026; Hàng Đẫy
17	Hanoi FC	1 (3)
18	SHB Da Nang	1 (4)
20 September 2026; Lạch Tray
19	Haiphong	0
20	Thep Can Tho	1
6 October 2026; Đà Lạt
21	Lam Dong	0
22	Song Lam Nghe An	2
6 October 2026; PVF
23	Cong An Nhan Dan	4
24	Hue	1
20 September 2026; Quy Nhơn
26	Hoang Anh Gia Lai	1
27	Hung Yen	3

Round of 16
19 January 2027; Hàng Đẫy
1	Cong An Hanoi
2	Dong Nai City
2 January 2027; Việt Yên
5	Bac Ninh
7	Van Hien University
3 January 2027; Thống Nhất
8	Cong An Ho Chi Minh City
10	Becamex Ho Chi Minh City
3 January 2027; Hàng Đẫy
11	The Cong–Viettel
13	Ho Chi Minh City FC
2 January 2027; Thiên Trường
14	Thep Xanh Nam Dinh
15	Xuan Thien Phu Tho
3 January 2027; Chi Lăng
18	SHB Da Nang
20	Thep Can Tho
2 January 2027; Vinh
22	Song Lam Nghe An
23	Cong An Nhan Dan
3 January 2027; Ninh Bình
25	Ninh Binh
27	Hung Yen

Quarter-finals

Semi-finals

Final

== Top goalscorers ==
The following are the top scorers of the Vietnamese Cup, sorted first by number of goals, and then alphabetically if necessary. Goals scored in penalty shoot-outs are not included.

As of 6 October 2026

Rank	Player	Team	Goals
1	(Brazil) Brenner	Bac Ninh	3
2	(Brazil) Matheus Lucas	Hoang Anh Gia Lai	2
2	(Brazil) Romário Alves	Long An	2
2	(Trinidad and Tobago) Shaqkeem Joseph	Hung Yen	2
5	24 players		1
