= Michael Olaha =

Nigerian footballer

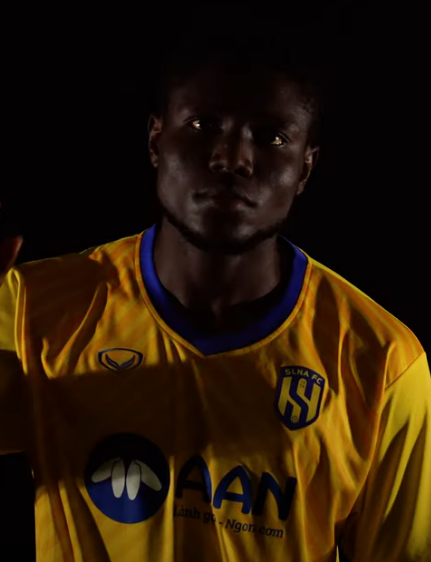
- Olaha in 2022

Personal information
- Full name: Michael Onyedikachi Olaha
- Date of birth: 4 July 1997 (age 29)
- Place of birth: Lagos, Nigeria
- Height: 1.86 m (6 ft 1 in)
- Position: Forward

Team information
- Current team: Cong An Ho Chi Minh City
- Number: 7

Youth career
- 2010–2014: New Generation Academy

Senior career*
Years	Team	Apps	(Gls)
2015–2017	Abia Warriors	39	(10)
2017–2019	Sông Lam Nghệ An	76	(18)
2020–2021	Hapoel Tel Aviv	15	(0)
2020–2021	→ Hapoel Kfar Shalem (loan)	34	(11)
2021–2026	Sông Lam Nghệ An	115	(35)
2026–	Cong An Ho Chi Minh City	7	(1)

International career^{‡}
2026–	Vietnam	1	(1)
- * Club domestic league appearances and goals as of 8 November 2026 ‡ National team caps and goals as of 11 November 2026

Michael Onyedikachi Olaha (born 4 July 1997), also known as Olaha Mạnh Đức, is a professional footballer who plays as a forward for V.League 1 club Cong An Ho Chi Minh City. Born in Nigeria, he represents the Vietnam national team.

== Club career ==
Olaha signed for Nigerian Premier League side Abia Warriors in 2015 from the New Generation Academy. After impressing in his first season, he was offered a trial with Slovenian side NK Domžale.

In January 2017, he signed with Vietnamese side Sông Lam Nghệ An. He scored a goal in the 2017 Vietnamese Cup final, helping the club win the title.

After two and a half years, he left Sông Lam Nghệ An and signed for Israeli Premier League club Hapoel Tel Aviv, for four years.

On 23 July 2020, he moved on loan to Hapoel Kfar Shalem.

In July 2021, Olaha re-joined Sông Lam Nghệ An. In the 2023–24 season, he was designated to be the team captain.

After Olaha's contract with Sông Lam Nghệ An expired, he joined Cong An Ho Chi Minh City in July 2026.

== International career ==
In November 2026, Olaha received his first call-up to the Vietnam national team, being named in the squad for the friendly tournament Casper Cup.

On 11 November 2026, Olaha scored a goal in his debut for Vietnam against Chinese Taipei in the 21st minute.

== Personal life ==
On 18 September 2026, after several years of residency in Vietnam, Olaha received his Vietnamese citizenship, with the Vietnamese personal name Olaha Mạnh Đức.

== Career statistics ==
=== Club ===
As of match played 18 November 2026

Appearances and goals by club, season and competition
Club	Season	League			National cup		Continental		Other		Total	
Club	Season	Division	Apps	Goals	Apps	Goals	Apps	Goals	Apps	Goals	Apps	Goals
Abia Warriors	2015	NPFL	6	2	?	?	—		—		6	2
Abia Warriors	2016	NPFL	33	8	?	?	—		—		33	8
Abia Warriors	Total		39	10	?	?	0	0	0	0	39	10
Song Lam Nghe An	2017	V.League 1	25	5	7	3	—		—		32	8
Song Lam Nghe An	2018	V.League 1	26	8	5	1	4 (Note: Appearance in AFC Cup)	1	1 (Note: Appearance in Vietnamese Super Cup)	0	36	10
Song Lam Nghe An	2019	V.League 1	25	5	1	0	—		—		25	5
Song Lam Nghe An	Total		76	18	13	4	4	1	1	0	94	23
Hapoel Tel Aviv	2019–20	Israeli Premier League	15	0	3	0	—		—		18	0
Hapoel Kfar Shalem (loan)	2020–21	Liga Leumit	34	11	2	0	—		—		36	11
Song Lam Nghe An	2022	V.League 1	22	3	0	0	—		—		22	3
Song Lam Nghe An	2023	V.League 1	18	5	0	0	—		—		18	5
Song Lam Nghe An	2023–24	V.League 1	26	13	0	0	—		—		26	13
Song Lam Nghe An	2024–25	V.League 1	23	5	2	2	—		—		25	7
Song Lam Nghe An	2025–26	V.League 1	26	9	1	2	—		—		27	11
Song Lam Nghe An	Total		115	35	3	4	0	0	0	0	118	39
Cong An Ho Chi Minh City	2026–27	V.League 1	7	1	0	0	—		3 (Note: One appearance in Vietnamese Super Cup; two appearances and one goal in ASEAN Club Championship)	1	10	2
Total career			286	75	21	8	4	1	4	1	315	85

=== International ===
As of match played 11 November 2026

Appearances and goals by national team and year
National team	Year	Apps	Goals
Vietnam	2026	1	1
Total		1	1

Scores and results list Vietnam's goal tally first, score column indicates score after each Olaha goal.

List of international goals scored by Olaha Mạnh Đức
No.	Date	Venue	Opponent	Score	Result	Competition
1	11 November 2026	Thiên Trường Stadium, Ninh Bình, Vietnam	Chinese Taipei	1–0	2–0	2026 Casper Cup

== Honours ==
Song Lam Nghe An

- Vietnamese Cup: 2017, runner-up: 2024–25
- Vietnamese Super Cup runner-up: 2017

Cong An Ho Chi Minh City

- Vietnamese Super Cup runner-up: 2026
