= Nguyễn Nhật Minh =

Vietnamese footballer (born 2003)

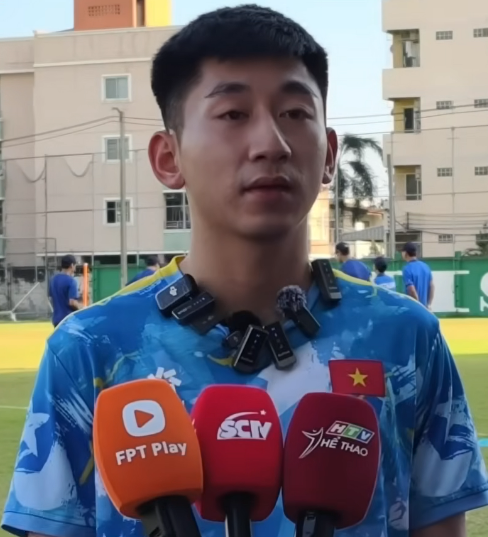
- Nhật Minh in 2025

Personal information
- Full name: Nguyễn Nhật Minh
- Date of birth: 27 July 2003 (age 23)
- Place of birth: Hải Phòng, Vietnam
- Height: 1.75 m (5 ft 9 in)
- Position: Center-back

Team information
- Current team: Công An Hồ Chí Minh City
- Number: 27

Youth career
- 2015–2021: Hoàng Anh Gia Lai
- 2021–2022: Nutifood

Senior career*
Years	Team	Apps	(Gls)
2023–2026	Hải Phòng	59	(0)
2023	→ Long An (loan)	7	(1)
2026–	Công An Hồ Chí Minh City	7	(0)

International career^{‡}
2019–2022	Vietnam U20	6	(0)
2024–2026	Vietnam U23	27	(0)
2026–	Vietnam	6	(0)
Medal record
Men's football
Representing Vietnam
AFC U-23 Asian Cup
Third place	Saudi Arabia 2026
ASEAN U-23 Championship
Winner	Indonesia 2025
AFF U-19 Youth Championship
Third place	Indonesia 2022	Team
- * Club domestic league appearances and goals as of 8 November 2026 ‡ National team caps and goals as of 11 November 2026

Nguyễn Nhật Minh (born 27 July 2003) is a Vietnamese professional footballer who plays as a center-back for V.League 1 club Công An Hồ Chí Minh City and the Vietnam national team.

== Club career ==
Born in Hải Phòng, Nhật Minh began his football career at the Hoàng Anh Gia Lai youth academy. At the age of 18, he was transferred to Nutifood. There, he was part of the team that won the 2021 Vietnamese National U-21 Championship. Shortly after, Nutifood released all their senior players.

In early 2023, Nhật Minh signed for V.League 1 club Hải Phòng, but was quickly loaned to Long An, where he made his senior debut in the 2023 V.League 2. On 27 February 2024, he made his debut with Hải Phòng in a 2–2 V.League 1 home draw against Sông Lam Nghệ An. He then quickly gain a starter spot in the team with his solid performance, starting in 14 out of 17 remaining games of the team until the end of the 2023–24 V.League 1 season.

In August 2026, after his contract with Hải Phòng ended, Nhật Minh joined Công An Hồ Chí Minh City.

== International career ==
Nhật Minh took part in the 2022 AFF U-19 Youth Championship with Vietnam U19 as the team finished third.

His playing style is characterized by discipline, high endurance, and the ability to read situations, which allows him to play in every crucial match. Nhật Minh was selected as part of a 23-man squad for the 2025 ASEAN U-23 Championship by Coach Kim Sang-sik. Coach Kim Sang-sik entrusted three defenders Hiểu Minh, Lý Đức, and Nhật Minh as the core members in the backline. He started all 4 matches Vietnam played, successfully defending Vietnam's U23 title. His performance earned him another call-up for the 2025 SEA Games in December, where Vietnam won gold. Following their success in regional football, Vietnam U23 traveled to Saudi Arabia for the 2026 AFC U-23 Asian Cup in January 2026. Nhật Minh was the only Vietnamese player to fully play in all 6 available matches, totaling 600 minutes, as Vietnam finished third in the tournament.

In October 2025, Nhật Minh was named to the Vietnam's squad to play Nepal in the 2027 AFC Asian Cup qualification. However, he did not make an appearance during this time. He made his debut for the national team on 31 March 2026 against Malaysia, coming on as a substitute for Cao Pendant Quang Vinh in the 90+2 minute.

Nhật Minh featured in Vietnam's 25-man squad for the 2026 ASEAN Championship.

== Career statistics ==
=== Club ===
As of match played 18 November 2026

Club	Season	League			Cup		Continental		Other		Total	
Club	Season	Division	Apps	Goals	Apps	Goals	Apps	Goals	Apps	Goals	Apps	Goals
Long An (loan)	2023	V.League 2	7	1	1	0	—		—		8	1
Hải Phòng	2023–24	V.League 1	16	0	2	0	0	0	—		18	0
Hải Phòng	2024–25	V.League 1	18	0	3	0	—		—		21	0
Hải Phòng	2025–26	V.League 1	25	0	1	0	—		—		26	0
Hải Phòng	Total		59	0	6	0	0	0	0	0	65	0
Công An Hồ Chí Minh City	2026–27	V.League 1	7	0	0	0	—		3 (Note: One appearance in Vietnamese Super Cup; two appearances in ASEAN Club Championship)	0	10	0
Total career			73	1	7	0	0	0	3	0	83	1

== Honours ==
Vietnam

- ASEAN Championship: 2026

Vietnam U23

- ASEAN U-23 Championship: 2025
- SEA Games gold medal: 2025
- AFC U-23 Asian Cup third place: 2026

Vietnam U19

- AFF U-19 Youth Championship third place: 2022

Individual

- V.League 1 Team of the Season: 2025–26
