= Patrik Le Giang =

Slovakian-Vietnamese footballer (born 1992)

Patrik Le Giang Lê Giang Patrik
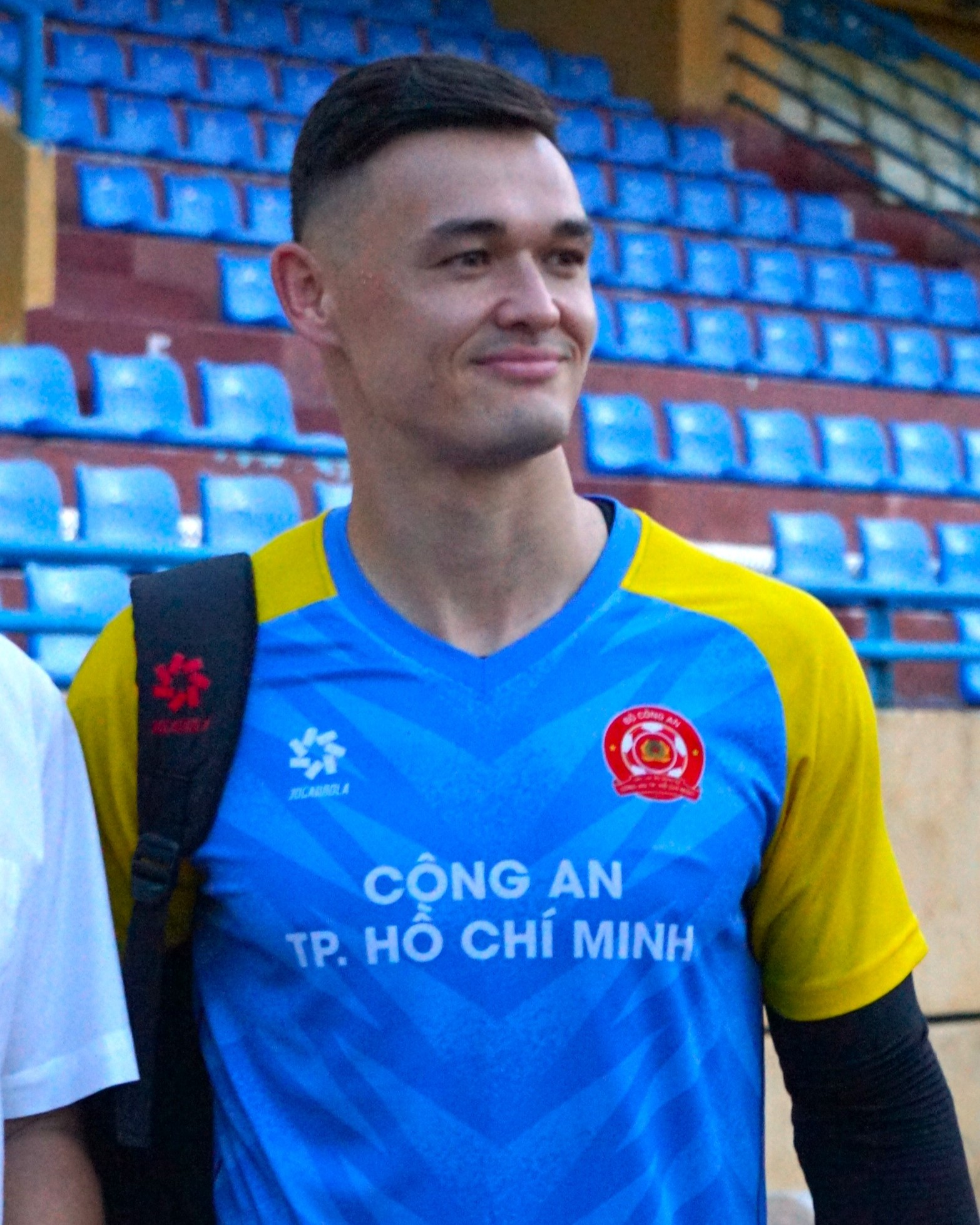
- Patrik in 2026

Personal information
- Date of birth: 8 September 1992 (age 34)
- Place of birth: Lučenec, Czechoslovakia
- Height: 1.88 m (6 ft 2 in)
- Position: Goalkeeper

Team information
- Current team: Cong An Ho Chi Minh City
- Number: 89

Youth career
- 1997–2007: Fiľakovo
- 2007–2011: Žilina

Senior career*
Years	Team	Apps	(Gls)
2011–2016	Žilina	7	(0)
2011–2012	→ Zemplín Michalovce (loan)	15	(0)
2014–2016	Žilina B	39	(0)
2016–2019	Sellier & Bellot Vlašim	14	(0)
2017–2018	→ Karviná (loan)	17	(0)
2019	→ Prostějov (loan)	12	(0)
2019–2021	Bohemians 1905	50	(0)
2022	Pohronie	14	(0)
2023–2024	Cong An Hanoi	8	(0)
2023–2024	→ Ho Chi Minh City (loan)	30	(0)
2024–	Cong An Ho Chi Minh City	50	(0)

International career^{‡}
2010	Slovakia U18	2	(0)
2010–2011	Slovakia U19	11	(0)
2014	Slovakia U20	2	(0)
2012–2015	Slovakia U21	16	(0)
2026–	Vietnam	14	(0)
Medal record
Men's football
ASEAN Championship
Representing Vietnam
Winner	ASEAN 2026
- * Club domestic league appearances and goals as of 8 November 2026 ‡ National team caps and goals as of 11 November 2026

Patrik Le Giang (born 8 September 1992), also spelled as Lê Giang Patrik, is a professional footballer who currently plays as a goalkeeper for V.League 1 club Cong An Ho Chi Minh City. Born in Slovakia, he plays for the Vietnam national team.

Patrik's career was mostly spent in Slovakia and Czech Republic. He has represented Slovakia at under-19 and under-21.

== Club career ==
Patrik was born in Lučenec, Czech and Slovak Federative Republic (now Slovakia). He started off his career in Fiľakovo. He joined the Žilina youth system when he was fifteen. In 2011, he was promoted to the first team of MŠK Žilina. In July 2011, he joined fellow league outfit Zemplín Michalovce on a one-year loan from Žilina. Patrik made his debut for Michalovce against LAFC Lučenec on 23 July 2011. He returned to Žilina in June 2012 after his loan spell in Michalovce expired. Patrik played his first match for Žilina on 15 May 2013 against ViOn Zlaté Moravce.

On 19 February 2023, he made his debut for Cong An Hanoi in a draw 1–1 against Hoang Anh Gia Lai. However in the middle of the season, he was loaned to Ho Chi Minh City due to the arrival of Filip Nguyen (both are non-naturalized Vietnamese players, but each team can only have one of them in the roster at the same time).

On 18 August 2024, after two seasons as the starting goalkeeper of Ho Chi Minh City, Patrik was permanently transferred to the team, signing a three-year contract. In the 2026 Vietnamese Cup final, Patrik's outstanding performance helped the team secure a 2–1 win over Ninh Binh, winning their first cup title since 2000.

== International career ==
Although born in Slovakia and available to play for Slovakia, he is also eligible to represent Vietnam due to his origin, as long as he also possesses Vietnamese citizenship. He has played for the Slovakia under-19s before representing its under-21 side.

In March 2026, Patrik was named in Vietnam national team's preliminary squad for the friendly match against Bangladesh and the Asian Cup qualification match against Malaysia. However, he did not make the final cut due to administrative problems.

In June 2026, Patrik named in Vietnam's 28-man preliminary squad for the 2026 ASEAN Championship. On July 18, 2026, Patrik made his official debut for Vietnam national team against Myanmar national team with a clean sheet of 4-0. In August 2026, following his great performance defending the Vietnamese sheet against Thailand during the first leg of the 2026 ASEAN Championship final, he was chosen as the MVP of the match. He was also awarded best goalkeeper of the tournament.

== Personal life ==
Patrik Le Giang is a Vietnamese-Slovak, born to a Slovak mother named Katarína and a Vietnamese father named Lê Giang Nam in Lučenec. He is the younger brother of fellow footballer Emil Le Giang.

In January 2026, he completed his Vietnamese naturalization process, receiving his Vietnamese nationality.

== Recognitions ==
On 16 November 2021, FIFPro has awarded him Merit Award for charitable contributions.

== Career statistics ==
=== Club ===
As of match played 18 November 2026

Appearances and goals by club, season and competition
Club	Season	League			Cup		Other		Total	
Club	Season	Division	Apps	Goals	Apps	Goals	Apps	Goals	Apps	Goals
Zemplín Michalovce (loan)	2011–12	2. Liga	15	0	2	0	—		17	0
Žilina	2012–13	Slovak First Football League	4	0	0	0	0	0	4	0
Žilina	2013–14	Slovak First Football League	3	0	0	0	0	0	3	0
Žilina	2014–15	Slovak First Football League	0	0	0	0	—		0	0
Žilina	2015–16	Slovak First Football League	0	0	0	0	0	0	0	0
Žilina	Total		7	0	0	0	0	0	7	0
Žilina B	2014–15	2. Liga	23	0	—		—		23	0
Žilina B	2015–16	2. Liga	16	0	—		—		16	0
Žilina B	Total		39	0	0	0	0	0	39	0
Sellier & Bellot Vlašim	2016–17	Czech National Football League	2	0	1	0	—		3	0
Sellier & Bellot Vlašim	2018–19	Czech National Football League	12	0	0	0	—		12	0
Sellier & Bellot Vlašim	Total		14	0	1	0	0	0	15	0
Karviná (loan)	2017–18	Czech First League	17	0	2	0	—		19	0
Prostějov (loan)	2018–19	Czech National Football League	12	0	—		—		12	0
Bohemians 1905	2019–20	Czech First League	14	0	0	0	1 (Note: Appearance in the Czech First League Europa League play-offs)	0	15	0
Bohemians 1905	2020–21	Czech First League	27	0	0	0	—		5	0
Bohemians 1905	2021–22	Czech First League	8	0	1	0	—		9	0
Bohemians 1905	Total		49	0	1	0	1	0	51	0
Bohemians 1905 B	2019–20	Bohemian Football League	5	0	—		—		5	0
Bohemians 1905 B	2021–22	Bohemian Football League	1	0	—		—		1	0
Bohemians 1905 B	Total		6	0	0	0	0	0	6	0
Pohronie	2021–22	Slovak First Football League	10	0	1	0	—		11	0
Pohronie	2022–23	2. Liga	4	0	1	0	—		5	0
Pohronie	Total		14	0	2	0	0	0	16	0
Cong An Hanoi	2023	V.League 1	8	0	1	0	—		9	0
Ho Chi Minh City (loan)	2023	V.League 1	5	0	—		—		5	0
Ho Chi Minh City (loan)	2023–24	V.League 1	25	0	1	0	—		26	0
Cong An Ho Chi Minh City	2024–25	V.League 1	17	0	1	0	—		18	0
Cong An Ho Chi Minh City	2025–26	V.League 1	26	0	4	0	—		30	0
Cong An Ho Chi Minh City	2026–27	V.League 1	7	0	0	0	3 (Note: One appearance in Vietnamese Super Cup and two appearances in ASEAN Club Championship)	0	10	0
Cong An Ho Chi Minh City	Total		80	0	6	0	3	0	89	0
Total career			261	0	15	0	4	0	280	0

=== International ===
As of match played 11 November 2026

Appearances and goals by national team and year
National team	Year	Apps	Goals
Vietnam	2026	14	0
Total		14	0

== Honours ==
Công An Hà Nội

- V.League 1: 2023

Công An Hồ Chí Minh City

- Vietnamese National Cup: 2025–26

Vietnam

- ASEAN Championship: 2026

Individual

- FIFPro Merit Award: 2021
- V.League 1 Team of the season: 2023–24
- ASEAN Championship Best Goalkeeper: 2026

== See also ==
- List of Vietnam footballers born outside Vietnam
