= Đinh Quang Kiệt =

Vietnamese footballer (born 2007)

Personal information
- Full name: Đinh Quang Kiệt
- Date of birth: 16 July 2007 (age 19)
- Place of birth: Long Hải, Bà Rịa-Vũng Tàu, Vietnam
- Height: 1.95 m (6 ft 5 in)
- Position: Center-back

Team information
- Current team: Công An Hồ Chí Minh City
- Number: 5

Youth career
- 2020–2024: Hoàng Anh Gia Lai

Senior career*
Years	Team	Apps	(Gls)
2024–2026	Hoàng Anh Gia Lai	33	(1)
2024	→ Kon Tum (loan)		
2024–2025	→ Long An (loan)	5	(0)
2026–	Công An Hồ Chí Minh City	5	(0)

International career^{‡}
2023	Vietnam U17	4	(0)
2024–	Vietnam U20	5	(0)
2025–	Vietnam U23	6	(0)
2026–	Vietnam	1	(0)
- * Club domestic league appearances and goals as of 8 November 2026 ‡ National team caps and goals as of 14 November 2026

Đinh Quang Kiệt (born 16 July 2007) is a Vietnamese professional footballer who plays as a center-back for V.League 1 club Công An Hồ Chí Minh City and the Vietnam national team.

== Early career ==
Quang Kiệt was born in a poor family in Bà Rịa-Vũng Tàu. At 13 years old, thanks to his exceptional height (1.86 m) compared to his peers, he caught the attention of scouts and was admitted to the Hoàng Anh Gia Lai Academy.

== Club career ==
In March 2024, Quang Kiệt joined Kon Tum on loan, where he made his senior debut in the Vietnamese Second Division.

In October 2024, Quang Kiệt was loaned to V.League 2 club Long An for one season. There, he made his professional in first matchday of the 2024–25 V.League 2, helping his team keep a clean sheet in a 0–0 draw against PVF-CAND.

After 3 months at Long An, Hoàng Anh Gia Lai recalled Quang Kiệt for the second part of the 2024–25 season. He made his V.League 1 debut on 8 February 2025, coming in as a substitute in his team 1–2 away loss against Thể Công-Viettel. On 9 November 2025, Quang Kiệt scored the first goal of his career, a last-minute header that secured a 1–1 draw for his team in the V.League 1 match against Đông Á Thanh Hóa.

In August 2026, Quang Kiệt was transferred to Công An Hồ Chí Minh City.

== International career ==
In June 2023, Quang Kiệt was called up to the Vietnam U17 team for the 2023 AFC U-17 Championship and appeared in two group stage games as a substitute.

In August 2025, Quang Kiệt received his first call up to the Vietnam national team for an internal training camp.

On 19 August 2026, Quang Kiệt made his debut for the national team against Malaysia in the 2026 ASEAN Championship semi-finals, coming in a substitute in the 80th minute to replace Đoàn Văn Hậu.

== Career statistics ==
=== Club ===
As of match played 18 November 2026

Club	Season	League			Cup		Continental		Other		Total	
Club	Season	Division	Apps	Goals	Apps	Goals	Apps	Goals	Apps	Goals	Apps	Goals
Long An (loan)	2024–25	V.League 2	5	0	0	0	—		—		5	0
Hoàng Anh Gia Lai	2024–25	V.League 1	9	0	—		—		—		9	0
Hoàng Anh Gia Lai	2025–26	V.League 1	24	1	1	0	—		—		25	1
Hoàng Anh Gia Lai	Total		33	1	1	0	0	0	0	0	34	1
Công An Hồ Chí Minh City	2025–26	V.League 1	5	0	0	0	—		2 (Note: Appearances in ASEAN Club Championship)	0	7	0
Total career			43	1	1	0	0	0	2	0	46	1

=== International ===
As of match played 28 August 2026

National team	Year	Apps	Goals
Vietnam	2026	1	0
Total		1	0

== Playing style ==
Being 1.95 m tall, Quang Kiệt possesses an outstanding height of compared to most footballers in Vietnam. Quang Kiệt played at center-back during his formation at the Hoàng Anh Gia Lai Academy. Later, at senior level, he was often settled by his coaches as a striker to take advantage of his good aerial ability in the attack.

== Honours ==
Vietnam

- ASEAN Championship: 2026

Vietnam U23

- Gia Lai U-23 VTV Cup: 2026
