= Lee Williams (footballer, born 2007) =

English footballer

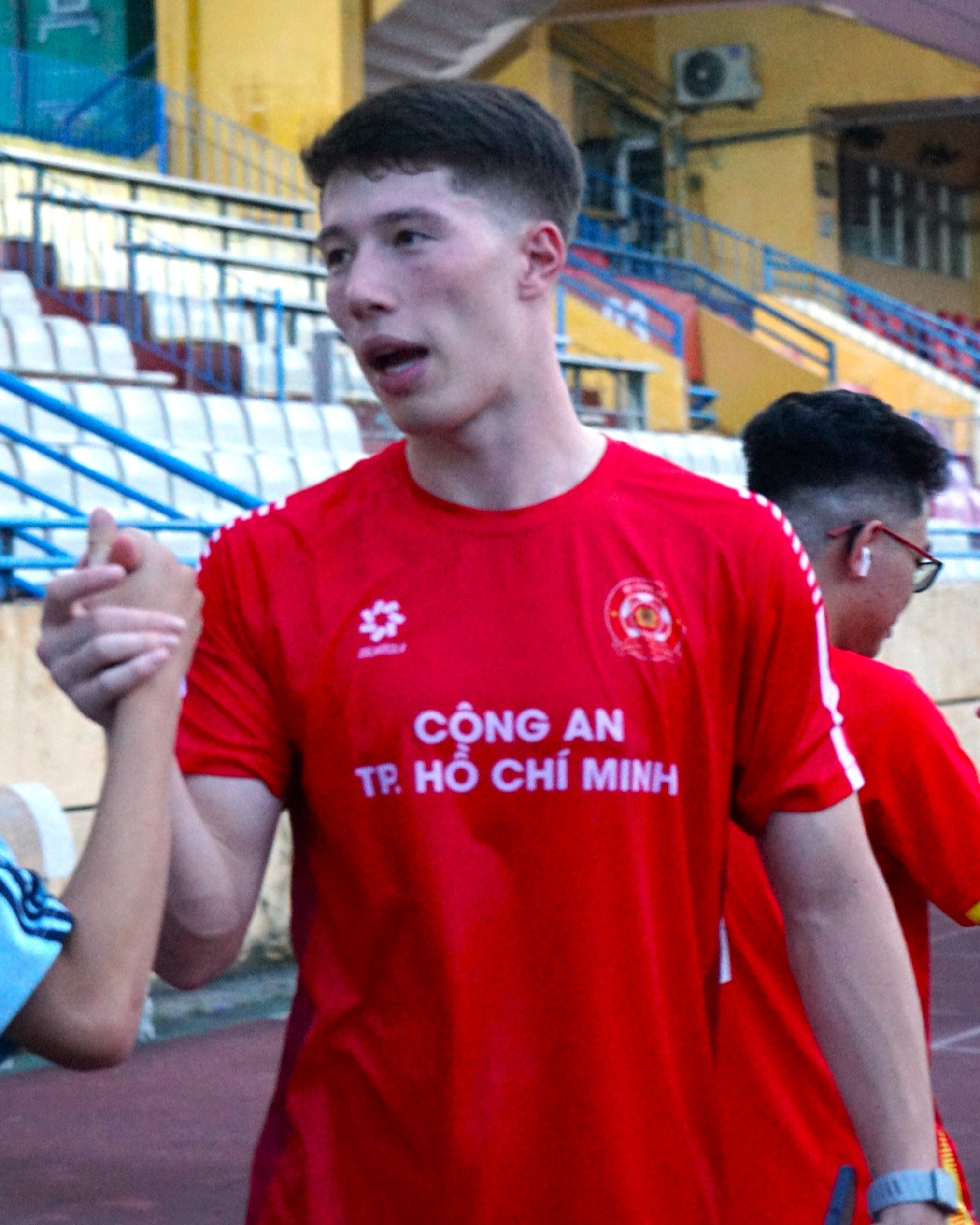
- Lee Williams in 2026

Personal information
- Full name: Lee Oliver Grant Williams
- Date of birth: 2 April 2007 (age 19)
- Place of birth: Liverpool, England
- Height: 1.90 m (6 ft 3 in)
- Position: Striker

Team information
- Current team: Cong An Ho Chi Minh City
- Number: 33

Youth career
- Blackburn Rovers
- 2020–2024: Stockport County

Senior career*
Years	Team	Apps	(Gls)
2024–2025	Stockport County	0	(0)
2025	→ Warrington Town (loan)	16	(3)
2025–2026	The Cong-Viettel	0	(0)
2025–2026	→ Cong An Ho Chi Minh City (loan)	17	(6)
2026–	Cong An Ho Chi Minh City	7	(1)

International career^{‡}
2026–	Vietnam U23	3	(1)
2026–	Vietnam	4	(1)
- * Club domestic league appearances and goals as of 8 November 2026 ‡ National team caps and goals as of 14 November 2026

Lee Oliver Grant Williams (born 2 April 2007), also known as Williams Minh Hoàng, is a professional footballer who plays as a striker for V.League 1 club Cong An Ho Chi Minh City. Born in England, he plays for the Vietnam national team.

== Early life ==
Williams was born in Liverpool, England to an English father and a Hoa ethnic Vietnamese mother. His maternal grandmother is from Hanoi.

== Club career ==
A youth product of Stockport County, Williams made his first appearance for the first team on 13 August 2024, starting in the club's 1–6 defeat against Blackburn Rovers in the 2024–25 EFL Cup. In January 2025, Williams joined Northern Premier League side Warrington Town on loan. There, he netted 3 goals and assisted once after 16 games for the team.

On 9 August 2025, after two weeks on trial with V.League 1 club The Cong-Viettel, Williams was signed by the club. As the club has filled all their foreign player and Vietnamese heritage players spots, Williams was loaned to league fellow Cong An Ho Chi Minh City. On 19 October 2025, he made his V.League 1 debut in his team's goalless draw against Hong Linh Ha Tinh. In the 2026 Vietnamese Cup final, Williams scored a goal to contribute in his team's 2–1 win against Ninh Binh, winning the team their team first cup title since 2000.

At the end of the 2025–26 season, Williams moved to Cong An Ho Chi Minh City permanently, signing a three-year contract.

== International career ==
In September 2026, Williams received his first call up to the Vietnam national team, being named in the squad for the 2026 FIFA ASEAN Cup. He scored his first international goal in the 4–2 win against Pakistan in this tournament.

== Personal life ==
On 18 September 2026, Williams received his Vietnamese citizenship, with the Vietnamese personal name Williams Minh Hoàng.

== Career statistics ==
=== Club ===
As of match played 8 November 2026

Appearances and goals by club, season and competition
Club	Season	League			National cup		League cup		Other		Total	
Club	Season	Division	Apps	Goals	Apps	Goals	Apps	Goals	Apps	Goals	Apps	Goals
Stockport County	2024–25	EFL League One	0	0	0	0	1	0	—		1	0
Warrington Town (loan)	2024–25	National League North	16	3	—		—		—		16	3
The Cong–Viettel	2025–26	V.League 1	0	0	—		—		—		0	0
Cong An Ho Chi Minh City (loan)	2025–26	V.League 1	17	6	4	3	—		—		21	9
Cong An Ho Chi Minh City	2026–27	V.League 1	7	1	0	0	—		1 (Note: One appearance in Vietnamese Super Cup)	0	8	1
Cong An Ho Chi Minh City	Total		24	7	4	3	—		1	0	29	10
Career total			39	10	4	3	1	0	0	0	44	13

=== International ===
As of match played 5 October 2026

Appearances and goals by national team and year
National team	Year	Apps	Goals
Vietnam	2026	4	1
Total		4	1

Scores and results list Vietnam's goal tally first, score column indicates score after each Williams goal.

List of international goals scored by Williams Minh Hoàng
No.	Date	Venue	Opponent	Score	Result	Competition
1	2 October 2026	Gelora Bung Karno Stadium, Jakarta, Indonesia	Pakistan	4–2	4–2	2026 FIFA ASEAN Cup

== Honours ==
Cong An Ho Chi Minh City

- Vietnamese Cup: 2025–26

Vietnam U23

- Gia Lai U-23 VTV Cup: 2026
