= Brayan Perea =

Colombian footballer (born 1993)

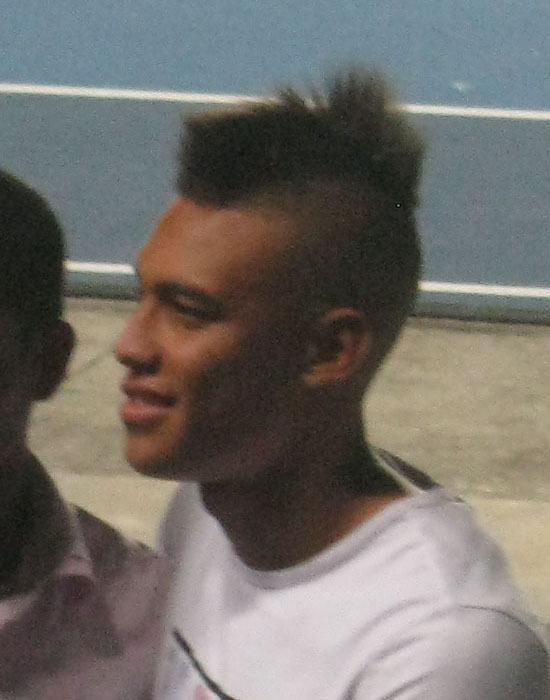

Personal information
- Full name: Brayan Andrés Perea Vargas
- Date of birth: 25 February 1993 (age 33)
- Place of birth: Cali, Colombia
- Height: 1.89 m (6 ft 2 in)
- Position: Forward

Team information
- Current team: Cong An Hanoi
- Number: 90

Youth career
- Deportivo Cali

Senior career*
Years	Team	Apps	(Gls)
2011–2013	Deportivo Cali	54	(11)
2013–2018	Lazio	24	(1)
2014–2015	→ Perugia (loan)	16	(1)
2015–2016	→ Troyes (loan)	12	(0)
2015–2016	→ Troyes B (loan)	4	(0)
2016–2017	→ Lugo (loan)	13	(0)
2019	Santa Fe	11	(1)
2020	Temperley	5	(0)
2020–2021	Palm Beach Stars	–	(–)
2022–2025	Botev Vratsa	92	(25)
2025–2026	Port	21	(7)
2026–	Cong An Hanoi	1	(1)

International career
2013–2014	Colombia U20	16	(1)
- * Club domestic league appearances and goals as of 2 June 2026

Brayan Andrés Perea Vargas (born 25 February 1993), nicknamed El Coco, is a Colombian professional footballer who plays as a forward for V.League 1 club Cong An Hanoi.

== Club career ==
=== Deportivo Cali ===
Perea began his career playing for the youth ranks of Deportivo Cali. He made his first team debut on 10 September 2011 against Boyacá Chicó. He entered the field in the 77th minute, substituting Cesar Amaya. In 2011, he failed to score a goal, having only made 7 appearances, most of them requiring him to get subbed on. He made his presence more noticeable in 2012, scoring 5 goals but still unable to make a mark in the first team. Due to an impressive campaign with Colombia at the 2013 South American Youth Championship, Perea was guaranteed a spot in the starting eleven almost every game. Perea would score 5 more goals for his home club in 2013 before signing with Serie A club Lazio.

=== Lazio ===
On 11 February 2013, it was announced that Perea signed a 5-year deal with Italian side Lazio for a fee of €2.5 million. He was handed the number 34 upon his arrival. He made his debut on 25 September, coming off the bench in a 3–1 win against Catania. Making his Europa League debut, Perea assisted 2 crucial goals in a 3–3 draw against Trabzonspor.

Perea scored his first goal for Le Aquile on 20 October, in a 2–1 loss to Atalanta. He scored his first Europa League goal against Legia in a 0–2 away victory.

Perea spent the following campaigns out on loan, representing Perugia, Troyes AC and CD Lugo.

He was released from his Lazio contract by mutual consent on 28 December 2018.

=== Independiente Santa Fe ===
On 27 January 2019 it was confirmed, that Perea had joined Independiente Santa Fe.

=== Temperley ===
Argentine club Club Atlético Temperley confirmed on 5 February 2020, that Perea had joined the club on a deal until June 2021.

=== Botev Vratsa ===
In early 2022 Perea joined Bulgarian club Botev Vratsa, but only began featuring for the team towards the end of the season. In July 2022, he extended his contract with the team until the summer of 2025.

=== Port ===
After the end of his contract with Botev Vratsa, it was announced Perea would be joining Thai League 1 side Port for the 2025–26 season.

=== Cong An Hanoi ===
In July 2026, Perea moved to Vietnam, joining V.League 1 club Cong An Hanoi.

== International career ==
Perea represented the Colombia U-20 at the 2013 South American Youth Championship. He scored a goal in the tournament against Argentina in the last match of the group stages. Eventually, Colombia won the championship and qualified for the 2013 FIFA U-20 World Cup. Included in the squad to dispute the 2013 FIFA U-20 World Cup, Perea made 4 appearances coming off the bench before Colombia's elimination in the round of 16.

== Honours ==
Lazio

- Supercoppa Italiana: 2017

Port

- Thai League Cup: 2025–26
- Piala Presiden: 2025

Cong An Hanoi

- Vietnamese Super Cup: 2026

Colombia U20

- South American Youth Championship: 2013

Individual

- Bulgarian First League Goal of the Week: 2021–22 (Week 27)
