= Nguyễn Phi Hoàng =

Vietnamese footballer (born 2003)

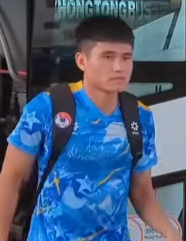
- Phi Hoàng in 2025

Personal information
- Full name: Nguyễn Phi Hoàng
- Date of birth: 27 March 2003 (age 23)
- Place of birth: Bố Trạch, Quảng Bình, Vietnam
- Height: 1.72 m (5 ft 8 in)
- Positions: Left-back; winger

Team information
- Current team: Công An Hồ Chí Minh City
- Number: 11

Youth career
- 2019–2020: SHB Đà Nẵng

Senior career*
Years	Team	Apps	(Gls)
2020–2026	SHB Đà Nẵng	110	(7)
2026–	Công An Hồ Chí Minh City	0	(0)

International career^{‡}
2023–2026	Vietnam U23	31	(0)
Medal record
Men's football
Representing Vietnam
AFC U-23 Asian Cup
Third place	Saudi Arabia 2026
ASEAN U-23 Championship
Winner	Thailand 2023
Winner	Indonesia 2025
- * Club domestic league appearances and goals as of 7 June 2026 ‡ National team caps and goals as of 25 September 2026

Nguyễn Phi Hoàng (born 27 March 2003) is a Vietnamese professional footballer who plays as a left-back or winger for V.League 1 club Công An Hồ Chí Minh City.

== Club career ==
Nguyễn Phi Hoàng was born on 27 March 2003, in Thanh Trạch, Bố Trạch, Quảng Bình. At the age of 16, he was promoted to SHB Đà Nẵng's first team to compete in the 2020 V.League 1. On 26 September 2020, he made his V.League 1 debut when he came on as a substitute in the match against Hải Phòng.

In the 2022 season, Phi Hoàng was given more opportunities to play. He had an impressive performance in the early part of the season with a brace against Sông Lam Nghệ An in Matchday 8 and a successful penalty against Topenland Bình Định At the end of the season, with 3 goals and 3 assists, Phi Hoàng won the "Best Young Player of the Season" award.

On 13 August 2026, Phi Hoàng was transferred to V.League 1 fellow Công An Hồ Chí Minh City.

== Career statistics ==
As of 27 June 2025

Appearances and goals by club, season and competition
Club	Season	League			Cup		Continental		Other		Total	
Club	Season	Division	Apps	Goals	Apps	Goals	Apps	Goals	Apps	Goals	Apps	Goals
SHB Da Nang	2020	V.League 1	4	0	0	0	—		—		4	0
SHB Da Nang	2021	V.League 1	6	0	0	0	—		—		6	0
SHB Da Nang	2022	V.League 1	20	3	1	0	—		—		21	3
SHB Da Nang	2023	V.League 1	16	0	1	0	—		—		17	0
SHB Da Nang	2023–24	V.League 2	18	2	2	1	—		—		20	3
SHB Da Nang	2024–25	V.League 1	23	1	1	0	—		1 (Note: Appearance in V.League 1 relegation play-offs)	0	25	1
SHB Da Nang	2025–26	V.League 1	23	1	2	1	—		—		25	2
SHB Da Nang	Total		110	7	7	2	0	0	1	0	118	9
Công An Hồ Chí Minh City	2026–27	V.League 1	0	0	0	0	—		0	0	0	0
Career total			110	7	7	2	0	0	1	0	118	9

== Honours ==
SHB Đà Nẵng

- V.League 2: 2023–24

Vietnam U23

- ASEAN U-23 Championship: 2023, 2025
- SEA Games gold medal: 2025
- AFC U-23 Asian Cup third place: 2026

Individual

- V.League 1 Young Player of the Season: 2022
