= Léo Gomes (footballer, born 1997) =

Brazilian footballer

Personal information
- Full name: Leonardo da Silva Gomes
- Date of birth: 30 April 1997 (age 29)
- Place of birth: Fortaleza, Brazil
- Height: 1.81 m (5 ft 11 in)
- Position: Midfielder

Team information
- Current team: Cong An Ho Chi Minh City
- Number: 12

Youth career
- –2018: Vitória

Senior career*
Years	Team	Apps	(Gls)
2018–2019	Vitória	48	(1)
2020–2022	Athletico Paranaense	10	(1)
2020–2021	→ América Mineiro (loan)	5	(0)
2021	→ Chapecoense (loan)	16	(0)
2022	→ São Bernardo-SP (loan)	10	(0)
2022	→ Vitória (loan)	20	(0)
2023	Vitória	21	(1)
2024–2025	Júbilo Iwata	34	(1)
2025–2026	Kyoto Sanga	11	(0)
2026	Ponte Preta	12	(1)
2026–	Cong An Ho Chi Minh City	0	(0)
- * Club domestic league appearances and goals as of 23 August 2026

Leonardo da Silva Gomes (born 30 April 1997), known as Léo Gomes, is a Brazilian professional footballer who plays as a midfielder for V.League 1 club Cong An Ho Chi Minh City.

== Career statistics ==
As of 25 October 2021.

Club	Season	League			State league		Cup		Continental		Other		Total	
Club	Season	Division	Apps	Goals	Apps	Goals	Apps	Goals	Apps	Goals	Apps	Goals	Apps	Goals
Vitória	2018	Série A	15	0	0	0	0	0	—		0	0	15	0
Vitória	2019	Série B	27	1	6 (Note: Appearance(s) in Campeonato Baiano)	0	0	0	—		4 (Note: Appearance(s) in Copa do Nordeste)	0	37	1
Vitória	Total		42	1	6	0	0	0	—		4	0	52	1
Athletico Paranaense	2020	Série A	2	0	8 (Note: Appearance(s) in Campeonato Paranaense)	1	0	0	1 (Note: Appearance(s) in Copa Libertadores)	0	0	0	11	1
América Mineiro (loan)	2020	Série B	4	0	—		—		—		—		4	0
América Mineiro (loan)	2021	Série A	0	0	1 (Note: Appearance(s) in Campeonato Mineiro)	0	0	0	—		—		1	0
América Mineiro (loan)	Total		4	0	1	0	0	0	—		—		5	0
Chapecoense (loan)	2021	Série A	7	0	9 (Note: Appearance(s) in Campeonato Catarinense)	0	0	0	—		—		16	0
Career total			55	1	24	1	0	0	1	0	4	0	84	2
