= Lê Quang Hùng =

Vietnamese footballer (born 1992)

Personal information
- Full name: Lê Quang Hùng
- Date of birth: 7 April 1992 (age 34)
- Place of birth: Vụ Bản, Nam Định, Vietnam
- Height: 1.65 m (5 ft 5 in)
- Position: Right-back

Team information
- Current team: Công An Hồ Chí Minh City
- Number: 34

Youth career
- 2004–2008: Hải Phòng

Senior career*
Years	Team	Apps	(Gls)
2009–2010	Hải Phòng	15	(0)
2011–2014	Vissai Ninh Bình	47	(9)
2023–2024	Becamex Bình Dương	28	(1)
2024–2025	SHB Đà Nẵng	16	(1)
2025–	Công An Hồ Chí Minh City	23	(0)

International career^{‡}
2013–2014	Vietnam U23	5	(0)
2014	Vietnam	1	(0)
- * Club domestic league appearances and goals as of 7 June 2026 ‡ National team caps and goals as of 1 April 2014

Lê Quang Hùng (born 7 June 1992) is a Vietnamese professional footballer who played as a right-back for V.League 1 club Công An Hồ Chí Minh City.

== Club career ==
In May 2014, Quang Hùng was permanently suspended by the Vietnam Football Federation (VFF) for participating in match-fixing in the 2014 AFC Cup game between Vissai Ninh Bình and Kelantan. He was also sentenced by the court to 27 months in prison and a 24 months suspended sentence.

In early March 2023, VFF lifted the permanent suspension which allowed Quang Hùng to return to participate in football activities. He signed for Becamex Bình Dương in the same month and made his return after 9 years in the team's 4–0 win against Huế in a Vietnamese Cup game.

In August 2024, Quang Hùng was transferred to SHB Đà Nẵng.

== Honours ==
Vissai Ninh Bình

- Vietnamese National Cup: 2013
- Vietnamese Super Cup: 2013

Công An Hồ Chí Minh City

- Vietnamese National Cup: 2025–26

Individual

- V.League 1 Team of the Season: 2013
