= Võ Minh Trọng =

Vietnamese footballer

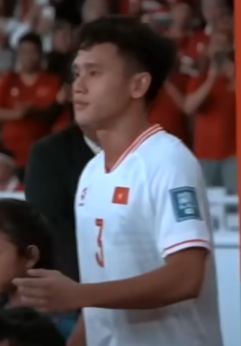
- Minh Trọng in 2024

Personal information
- Full name: Võ Minh Trọng
- Date of birth: 24 October 2001 (age 25)
- Place of birth: Ô Môn, Cần Thơ, Vietnam
- Height: 1.70 m (5 ft 7 in)
- Position: Left-back

Team information
- Current team: Công An Hồ Chí Minh City
- Number: 17

Youth career
- 2017–2020: Đồng Tháp

Senior career*
Years	Team	Apps	(Gls)
2020–2023	Đồng Tháp	27	(0)
2022	→ Phú Thọ (loan)	20	(0)
2023–2026	Becamex Hồ Chí Minh City	49	(2)
2026	→ Công An Hồ Chí Minh City (loan)	10	(0)
2026–	Công An Hồ Chí Minh City	0	(0)

International career^{‡}
2019–2020	Vietnam U19	3	(0)
2022–2024	Vietnam U23	14	(0)
2023–2024	Vietnam	10	(0)
Medal record
Men's football
Representing Vietnam
AFF U-23 Championship
Winner	Cambodia 2022
SEA Games
Bronze medal – third place	Phnom Penh 2023	Team
- * Club domestic league appearances and goals as of 7 June 2026 ‡ National team caps and goals as of 3 May 2023

Võ Minh Trọng (born 24 October 2001) is a Vietnamese professional footballer who plays as a left back for V.League 1 team Công An Hồ Chí Minh City.

== Early career ==
Võ Minh Trọng only started playing football at the age of 16 when he joined the youth team of Đồng Tháp in 2017. In 2020, he received a six-month ban from worldwide football activities from FIFA over match fixing during the national U21 tournament.

== Club career ==
In 2022, Minh Trọng was loaned to V.League 2 team Phú Thọ, where he played 18 out of 22 games possible in the league during the 2022 season.

In the 2023 season, Minh Trọng played for Đồng Tháp in the Vietnamese Second Division. He helped the team finish first in their group, and later contributed in Đồng Tháp's play off win against SHB Da Nang Youth as the team promote to the V.League 2.

On 6 October 2023, Minh Trọng joined V.League 1 side Becamex Bình Dương on an undisclosed transfer fee.

On 3 January 2026, Minh Trọng was loaned to V.League 1 fellow Công An Hồ Chí Minh City. He was transferred to the club permanently on 13 August.

== International career ==
Minh Trọng was included in Vietnam under-23 original squad for the 2022 AFF U-23 Championship. He didn't make any appearances during the tournament after being tested positive with COVID-19. His teammates later secured the title by defeating Thailand in the final.

In April 2023, Minh Trọng was named by coach Philippe Troussier in Vietnam U22's 20-men squad for the 2023 SEA Games.

In January 2024, he was named in Vietnam's 26-men squad for the 2023 AFC Asian Cup.

== Career statistics ==
=== International ===
As of match played 26 March 2024

Appearances and goals by national team and year
National team	Year	Apps	Goals
Vietnam	2023	4	0
Vietnam	2024	6	0
Total		10	0

== Honours ==
Công An Hồ Chí Minh City

- Vietnamese National Cup: 2025–26

Vietnam U23

- AFF U-23 Championship: 2022
- SEA Games bronze medal: 2023
