= Aldaír Ferreira =

Angolan footballer

Aldaír
Personal information
- Full name: Aldaír Caputa Ferreira
- Date of birth: 26 March 1998 (age 28)
- Place of birth: Luanda, Angola
- Height: 1.75 m (5 ft 9 in)
- Position: Midfielder

Team information
- Current team: Cong An Ho Chi Minh City
- Number: 10

Youth career
- 2008–2013: Sporting CP
- 2013–2017: Gil Vicente

Senior career*
Years	Team	Apps	(Gls)
2017–2018	Oliveirense	23	(0)
2018–2019	Vilaverdense	26	(2)
2019–2020	Cova da Piedade	27	(0)
2020–2021	Etar	24	(1)
2021–2022	Rodos	5	(0)
2022	Asteras Vlachioti	14	(1)
2022–2023	Džiugas	51	(2)
2024–2026	Botoșani	73	(3)
2026–	Cong An Ho Chi Minh City	0	(0)
- * Club domestic league appearances and goals as of 4 August 2026

Aldaír Caputa Ferreira (born 26 March 1998), commonly known as Aldaír, is an Angolan professional footballer who plays as a midfielder for V.League 1 club Cong An Ho Chi Minh City.

== Club career ==
Aldaír was born in Luanda, Angola but moved to Portugal at early age. He joined Sporting CP as a 10-year-old and spent five years training at the club before joining Gil Vicente at the age of 15.

Aldaír started his senior career at Oliveirense in 2017 and remained there until 2018 when signing for Vilaverdense.

On 23 September 2020, Aldaír joined as a free agent Bulgarian club Etar Veliko Tarnovo, signing a two-year contract. Two days later he made his Bulgarian First League debut in a 5–1 away loss against CSKA 1948 Sofia.

In July 2022 he signed with Lithuanian club FC Džiugas. On 27 August he scored the goal against FK Panevėžys.

On 4 August 2026, Aldaír joined Vietnamese club Cong An Ho Chi Minh City.
