= Lenn-Minh Tran =

Belgian footballer (born 2007)

Personal information
- Full name: Lenn-Minh Quang Tran
- Date of birth: 13 March 2007 (age 19)
- Place of birth: Hasselt, Belgium
- Height: 1.69 m (5 ft 7 in)
- Position: Right-back

Team information
- Current team: Cong An Ho Chi Minh City
- Number: 2

Youth career
- –2025: Genk

Senior career*
Years	Team	Apps	(Gls)
2025–2026	MVV	32	(0)
2026–	Cong An Ho Chi Minh City	0	(0)

International career^{‡}
2022–2023	Belgium U16	10	(0)
2023	Belgium U17	2	(0)
2025–	Belgium U19	4	(0)
- * Club domestic league appearances and goals as of 28 April 2026 ‡ National team caps and goals as of 18 November 2025

Lenn-Minh Quang Tran (born 13 March 2007) is a Belgian professional footballer who plays as a right-back for V.League 1 club Cong An Ho Chi Minh City.

== Early life ==
Tran was born on 13 March 2007 in Hasselt, Belgium, the son of a Vietnamese father and a Belgian mother.

== Club career ==
As a youth player, Tran joined the youth academy of Belgian side KRC Genk, helping the club's under-18 team win the league title. Following his stint there, he signed for Dutch side MVV Maastricht ahead of the 2025–26 season.

On 20 July 2026, Tran was transferred to V.League 1 side Cong An Ho Chi Minh City.

== International career ==
Tran is a Belgium youth international. During November 2025 he played for the Belgium national under-19 football team for 2026 UEFA European Under-19 Championship qualification.

== Career statistics ==
As of match played 12 December 2025

Appearances and goals by club, season and competition
Club	Season	League			National cup		Other		Total	
Club	Season	Division	Apps	Goals	Apps	Goals	Apps	Goals	Apps	Goals
MVV	2025–26	Eerste Divisie	20	0	1	0	—		39	9
Career total			20	0	1	0	—		21	0
