= Đặng Văn Trâm =

Vietnamese footballer (born 1995)

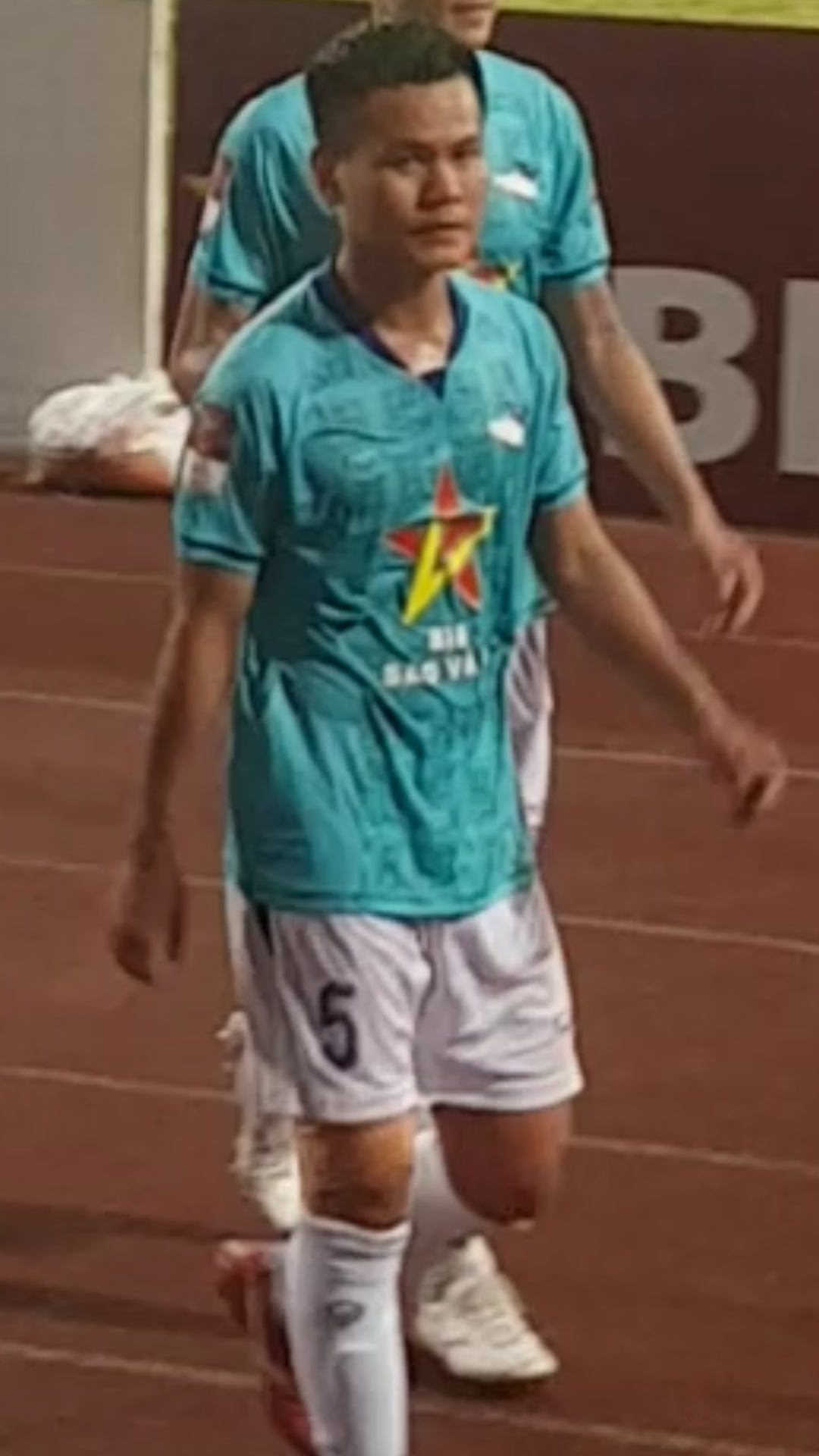
- Văn Trâm in 2024

Personal information
- Full name: Đặng Văn Trâm
- Date of birth: 2 January 1995 (age 31)
- Place of birth: Thanh Hà, Hải Dương, Vietnam
- Height: 1.68 m (5 ft 6 in)
- Position: Midfielder

Team information
- Current team: Công An Hồ Chí Minh City
- Number: 6

Youth career
- 2009–2014: Viettel

Senior career*
Years	Team	Apps	(Gls)
2014–2020	Viettel	60	(2)
2021–2022	Topeland Bình Định	5	(0)
2023–2025	Hồng Lĩnh Hà Tĩnh	35	(0)
2025–2026	Thể Công-Viettel	8	(0)
2026–	Công An Hồ Chí Minh City	0	(0)
- * Club domestic league appearances and goals as of 7 June 2026

Đặng Văn Trâm (born 2 January 1995) is a Vietnamese professional footballer who plays as a midfielder for V.League 1 club Công An Hồ Chí Minh City.

== Career ==
Văn Trâm was a product of Viettel. He was part of the Viettel squad that won the 2020 V.League 1. He joined Topeland Bình Định in 2021 and moved to Hồng Lĩnh Hà Tĩnh in 2023, before moving back to Thể Công-Viettel in 2025 where he remained for one season.

In August 2026, Văn Trâm signed for Công An Hồ Chí Minh City.

== Honours ==
Viettel

- V.League 1: 2020
- V.League 2: 2018
