= Nguyễn Thái Quốc Cường =

Vietnamese footballer (born 2004)

Personal information
- Full name: Nguyễn Thái Quốc Cường
- Date of birth: 6 March 2004 (age 22)
- Place of birth: Đô Lương, Nghệ An, Vietnam
- Height: 1.73 m (5 ft 8 in)
- Position: Midfielder

Team information
- Current team: Công An Hồ Chí Minh City
- Number: 19

Youth career
- 2014–2020: Hoàng Anh Gia Lai
- 2020–2022: Nutifood

Senior career*
Years	Team	Apps	(Gls)
2022	Nutifood	7	(4)
2023–2024	Bà Rịa-Vũng Tàu	32	(4)
2024–	Công An Hồ Chí Minh City	44	(4)

International career^{‡}
2025–2026	Vietnam U23	20	(0)
2026–	Vietnam	1	(0)
Medal record
Men's football
Representing Vietnam
AFC U-23 Asian Cup
Third place	Saudi Arabia 2026
SEA Games
Gold medal – first place	Bangkok 2025
- * Club domestic league appearances and goals as of 7 November 2026 ‡ National team caps and goals as of 11 November 2026

Nguyễn Thái Quốc Cường (born 6 March 2004) is a Vietnamese professional footballer who plays as a midfielder for V.League 1 club Công An Hồ Chí Minh City and the Vietnam national team.

== Early career ==
Born in Nghệ An, Quốc Cường moved to Đồng Nai at an early age with his family. In 2014, he joined the HAGL– Arsenal JMG Academy. He is a member of the Hoàng Anh Gia Lai under 19 team that finished second in the 2020 Vietnamese National U-19 Championship. Shortly after the tournament, he joined the Nutifood JMG Academy, a team that is affiliated with his previous club Hoàng Anh Gia Lai. As a starter with the Nutifood under-17s, he finished as runners-up with his team in the 2020 Vietnamese National U-17 Championship.

== Club career ==
Quốc Cường played in the 2022 Vietnamese Football League Third Division with Nutifood. He scored 4 goals after 7 games as his team finish as league leader in the regular season, but his team failed to gain a promotion after losing to Luxury Hạ Long in the promotion play off game.

In 2023, he signed for Bà Rịa-Vũng Tàu, who plays in the V.League 2. Quốc Cường scored 2 goals after 12 league games and secured the team in a safe position in the table to remain in the league. In the following season, he appeared in all 20 league games for the team and scored 2 goals.

On 7 August 2024, Quốc Cường joined V.League 1 side Hồ Chí Minh City.

== International career ==
Quốc Cường was called up several youth categories of the Vietnamese national team, including the under-15, under-16, under-18 and under-23, but never made an official appearance for these teams.

== Career statistics ==
=== Club ===
As of match played 18 November 2026

Appearances and goals by club, season and competition
Club	Season	League			National cup		Continental		Other		Total	
Club	Season	Division	Apps	Goals	Apps	Goals	Apps	Goals	Apps	Goals	Apps	Goals
Nutifood	2022	Second Division	7	4	—		—		1 (Note: Appearances in Second Division final stage)	0	8	4
Bà Rịa-Vũng Tàu	2023	V.League 2	12	2	2	0	—		—		14	2
Bà Rịa-Vũng Tàu	2023–24	V.League 2	20	2	0	0	—		—		20	2
Bà Rịa-Vũng Tàu	Total		32	4	2	0	—		—		34	4
Công An Hồ Chí Minh City	2024–25	V.League 1	14	1	0	0	—		—		14	1
Công An Hồ Chí Minh City	2025–26	V.League 1	23	2	3	0	—		—		26	2
Công An Hồ Chí Minh City	2026–27	V.League 1	7	1	0	0	—		3 (Note: One appearance in Vietnamese Super Cup; two appearances and one goal in ASEAN Club Championship)	1	10	2
Công An Hồ Chí Minh City	Total		44	4	3	0	0	0	3	1	50	5
Total career			83	12	5	0	0	0	4	1	92	13

== Personal life ==
Quốc Cường is the cousin of Vietnam national team player Nguyễn Công Phượng.

== Honours ==
Công An Hồ Chí Minh City

- Vietnamese National Cup: 2025–26

Vietnam U23

- SEA Games gold medal: 2025
- AFC U-23 Asian Cup third place: 2026
