= Đặng Văn Lắm =

Vietnamese footballer (born 1999)

Personal information
- Full name: Đặng Văn Lắm
- Date of birth: 6 December 1999 (age 26)
- Place of birth: Đô Lương, Nghệ An, Vietnam
- Height: 1.70 m (5 ft 7 in)
- Position: Midfielder

Team information
- Current team: Sông Lam Nghệ An
- Number: 27

Youth career
- 2010–2020: Sông Lam Nghệ An

Senior career*
Years	Team	Apps	(Gls)
2020–2024	Sông Lam Nghệ An	38	(1)
2024–2025	Quảng Nam	16	(2)
2025–2026	Công An Hồ Chí Minh City	2	(0)
2026–	Sông Lam Nghệ An	0	(0)

International career^{‡}
2022	Vietnam U23	1	(0)
- * Club domestic league appearances and goals as of 7 June 2026 ‡ National team caps and goals as of 19 April 2022

Đặng Văn Lắm (born 6 December 1999) is a Vietnamese professional footballer who plays as a midfielder for V.League 1 club Sông Lam Nghệ An.

== Club career ==
Born in Nghệ An, Văn Lắm was a youth product of the local Sông Lam Nghệ An academy. He was promoted to the first team in 2020, and started right in the first matchday game of the 2020 V.League 1, in his team's goalless draw against Sài Gòn. On 18 June 2020, he scored his first career goal from a long range shot to help his team defeat Hà Nội 1–0 in an away victory. In the middle part of the 2020 season, he suffered from a serious injury, which ruled him out of the remaining of the season and also the 2021 season. Following his recover from the injury, Văn Lắm received very few game time, appearing only in a total 28 games during his three final season with Sông Lam Nghệ An.

In July 2024, Văn Lắm signed for V.League 1 fellow Quảng Nam as a free agent. After a year at the club, he moved to Công An Hồ Chí Minh City.

== Honours ==
Công An Hồ Chí Minh City

- Vietnamese National Cup: 2025–26
