= Trần Hoàng Phúc =

Vietnamese footballer

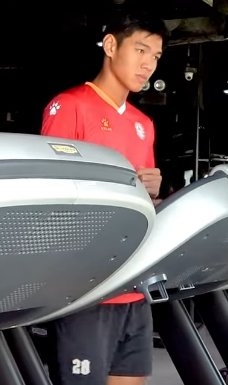
- Hoàng Phúc in 2023

Personal information
- Full name: Trần Hoàng Phúc
- Date of birth: 28 April 2001 (age 25)
- Place of birth: Vĩnh Long, Vietnam
- Height: 1.81 m (5 ft 11 in)
- Position: Center back

Team information
- Current team: Công An Hồ Chí Minh City
- Number: 28

Youth career
- 2012–2020: PVF

Senior career*
Years	Team	Apps	(Gls)
2020	Phố Hiến	5	(0)
2021–2022	Bà Rịa-Vũng Tàu	19	(0)
2023–	Công An Hồ Chí Minh City	62	(0)

International career^{‡}
2019	Vietnam U19	3	(0)
- * Club domestic league appearances and goals as of 7 June 2026 ‡ National team caps and goals as of 25 July 2019

Trần Hoàng Phúc (born 28 April 2001) is a Vietnamese professional footballer who plays as a center back for V.League 1 club Công An Hồ Chí Minh City.

== Club career ==
Born in Vĩnh Long, Hoàng Phúc started his youth career playing for the youth team of his region. He joined PVF Football Academy in 2012.

In 2021, he joined V.League 2 club Bà Rịa-Vũng Tàu for two seasons, before returning at the club.

In 2023, Hoàng Phúc joined V.League 1 side Hồ Chí Minh City.

== International career ==
Hoàng Phúc took part in the 2019 AFF U-18 Youth Championship with Vietnam under-18s and appeared in three group stage matches.

In August 2025, Hoàng Phúc received his first call up to the Vietnam national team for an internal training camp.

== Honours ==
Công An Hồ Chí Minh City

- Vietnamese National Cup: 2025–26
