= Nguyễn Đức Phú =

Vietnamese footballer (born 2003)

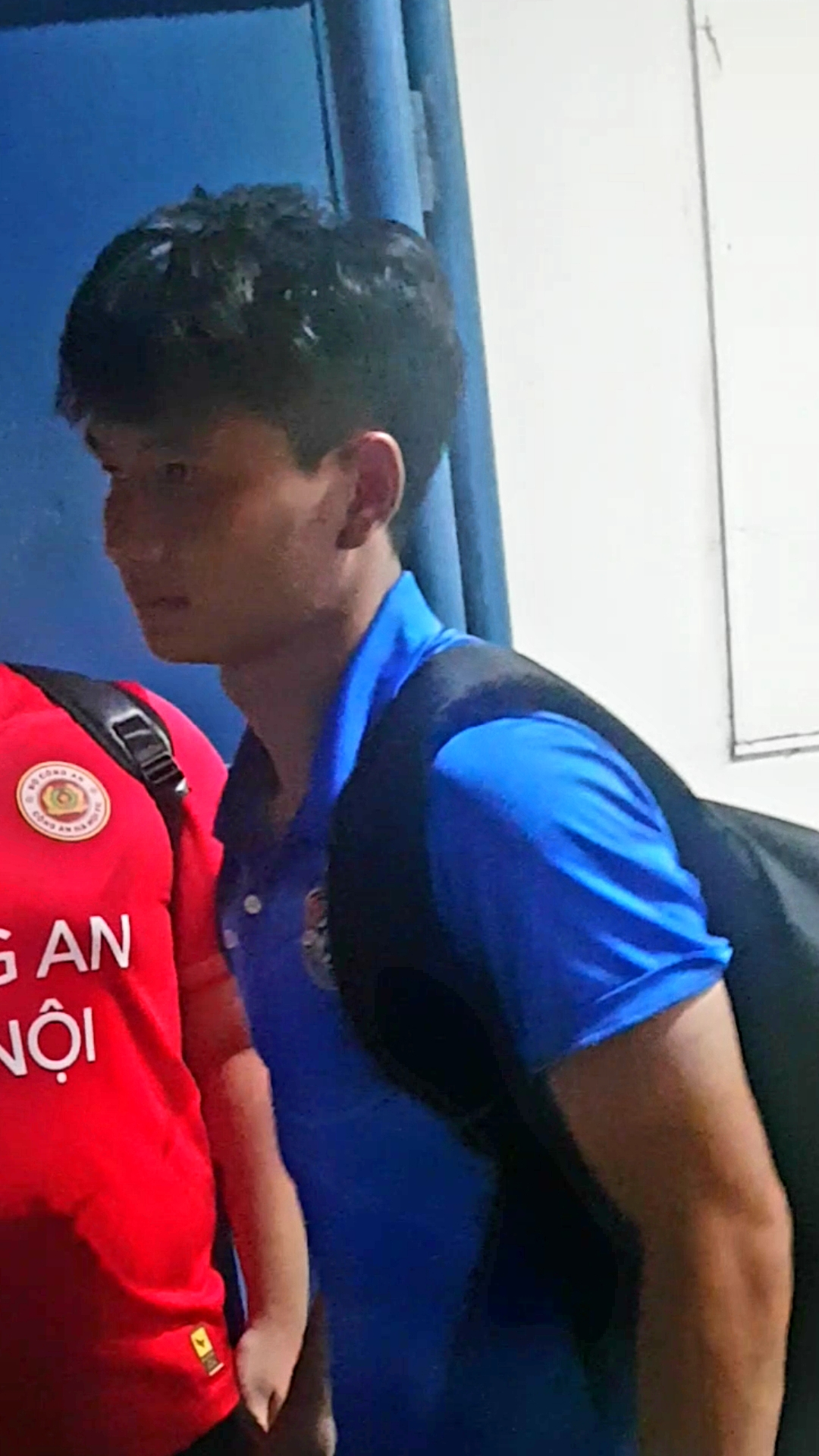
- Đức Phú in 2024

Personal information
- Full name: Nguyễn Đức Phú
- Date of birth: 13 January 2003 (age 23)
- Place of birth: An Dương, Hải Phòng, Vietnam
- Height: 1.70 m (5 ft 7 in)
- Position: Defensive midfielder

Team information
- Current team: Công An Hồ Chí Minh City
- Number: 39

Youth career
- 2016–2019: Hải Phòng
- 2019–2022: PVF

Senior career*
Years	Team	Apps	(Gls)
2022–2026	PVF-CAND	66	(1)
2025–2026	→ Công An Hồ Chí Minh City (loan)	22	(1)
2026–	Công An Hồ Chí Minh City	2	(0)

International career^{‡}
2020–2023	Vietnam U20	5	(0)
2023–	Vietnam U23	20	(0)
Medal record
Men's football
Representing Vietnam
SEA Games
Bronze medal – third place	Phnom Penh 2023	Team
- * Club domestic league appearances and goals as of 13 September 2026 ‡ National team caps and goals as of 14 November 2026

Nguyễn Đức Phú (born 13 January 2003) is a Vietnamese professional footballer who plays as a defensive midfielder for V.League 1 club Công An Hồ Chí Minh City.

== Early career ==
Born in Hải Phòng, Đức Phú started playing football in 2016 for his local youth team. In 2019, he was admitted to PVF Football Academy. He quickly gained a starter spot at PVF youth team and won two consecutive Vietnamese National U-19 Football Championships in 2020 and 2021.

== Club career ==
In 2022, Đức Phú was promoted to PVF Football Academy's first team Phố Hiến. In his first season with the club, Đức Phú started in 18 out of 22 matches in V.League 2 and scored 1 goal, helping the club finish third in the league.

In August 2025, Đức Phú joined V.League 1 club Công An Hồ Chí Minh City on loan. He permanently joined the team in summer 2026.

== International career ==
Đức Phú was called up to Vietnam national under-20 team to participate in the 2023 AFC U-20 Championship. He started in all three group stage matches but Vietnam failed to reach the quarter-finals despite having won two out of their three matches. Later in the same year, he was included on Vietnam under-22's 20 men squad for the 2023 Southeast Asian Games.

In June 2023, Đức Phú was called up to the Vietnam senior squad for the first time, for friendly game against Syria in Nam Định.

== Honours ==
Công An Hồ Chí Minh City

- Vietnamese National Cup: 2025–26

Vietnam U23

- SEA Games bronze medal: 2023
- Gia Lai U-23 VTV Cup: 2026
