= Khổng Minh Gia Bảo =

Vietnamese footballer

Personal information
- Full name: Khổng Minh Gia Bảo
- Date of birth: 26 July 2000 (age 26)
- Place of birth: Ba Đình, Hanoi, Vietnam
- Height: 1.75 m (5 ft 9 in)
- Position: Center-back

Team information
- Current team: Công An Hồ Chí Minh City
- Number: 13

Youth career
- –2018: Công An Nhân Dân

Senior career*
Years	Team	Apps	(Gls)
2018–2021	Công An Nhân Dân	8+	(0)
2022–2024	Phù Đổng Ninh Bình	36	(1)
2024–2025	Quảng Nam	20	(0)
2025–	Công An Hồ Chí Minh City	23	(0)

International career^{‡}
2026—	Vietnam	1	(0)
Medal record
Men's football
Representing Vietnam
ASEAN Championship
Winner	ASEAN 2026
- * Club domestic league appearances and goals as of 7 June 2026 ‡ National team caps and goals as of 26 August 2026

Khổng Minh Gia Bảo (born 26 July 2000) is a Vietnamese professional footballer who is a center-back for V.League 1 club Công An Hồ Chí Minh City.

== Club career ==
A youth product of Công An Nhân Dân, Gia Bảo made his debut for the club in the 2018 Second Division.

In 2022, Gia Bảo moved to Phù Đổng in the V.League 2. Ahead of the 2023–24 season, he was in Công An Hà Nội's training camp but was later sent back to Phù Đổng.

In September 2024, Gia Bảo signed for V.League 1 club Quảng Nam. Under Văn Sỹ Sơn's management, he quickly gained a starter spot in the team and appeared in 20 league games. However, Quảng Nam dissolved at the end of the season, leaving Gia Bảo as a free agent. He first went to SHB Đà Nẵng, before being signed by Công An Hồ Chí Minh City.

== International career ==
In November 2025, Gia Bảo got called up to the Vietnam national team for the first time. On 7 August 2026, he made his debut for Vietnam against Cambodia in the 2026 ASEAN Championship, coming in as a substitute for Phạm Xuân Mạnh in the 79th minute.

== Honours ==
Công An Hồ Chí Minh City

- Vietnamese National Cup: 2025–26

Vietnam

- ASEAN Championship: 2026
