= Ninh Bình Stadium =

Stadium of Ninh Bình, Vietnam

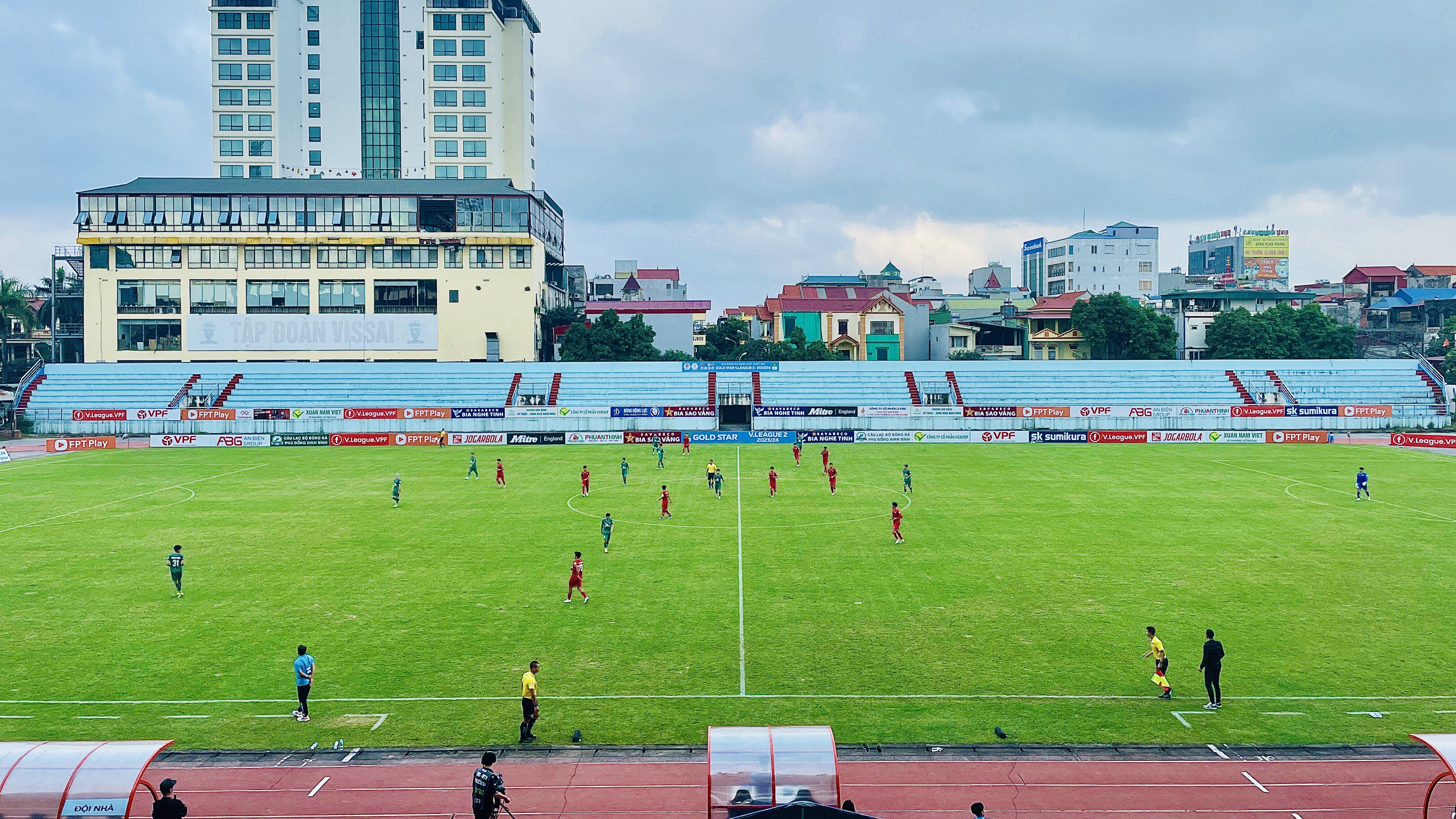
- Ninh Binh Stadium in 2024
- Interactive map of Ninh Bình Stadium
- Full name: Sân vận động Ninh Bình
- Former names: Tràng An Stadium
- Location: Hoa Lư, Ninh Bình, Vietnam
- Coordinates: 20°15′30.7″N 105°58′8.6″E
- Owner: Department of Culture and Sports of Ninh Binh province
- Capacity: 25.000

Construction
- Built: 2003
- Opened: 2003
- Renovated: 2021

Tenants
- Vissai Ninh Bình FC (2007-2015); Cong An Nhan Dan FC (2022); Ninh Binh FC (2023-now)

Ninh Bình Stadium is a multi-use stadium in Hoa Lư, Ninh Bình, Vietnam with a capacity of 25.000 spectators. It was the home stadium of Vissai Ninh Bình in the V-League before they disbanded in 2015. Since 2023, it has become the home stadium of Ninh Bình.
