= Vietnamese National Football Super Cup =

- Organiser(s): Vietnam Professional Football
- Founded: 1998; 28 years ago
- Region: Vietnam
- Teams: 2
- Related competitions: Vietnamese Cup (qualifier); V.League 1 (qualifier)
- Current champions: Cong An Hanoi FC (2nd title)
- Most championships: Hanoi FC (5 titles)
- Broadcaster(s): VTV; FPT Play (FPT produces the coverage); TV360 (except with network-only commentary between half); VTV (VTV6); HTV (HTV Thể Thao) (FPT produces all matches except when VTV and HTV is live)
- Website: Vietnamese Super Cup
- 2026 Vietnamese Super Cup

Vietnamese National Football Super Cup (Vietnamese: Siêu cúp bóng đá Việt Nam), also called the Thaco National Football Super Cup due to sponsorship reasons, is Vietnamese football's annual match contested between the champions of the previous V.League 1 season and the holders of the Vietnamese Cup. If the V.League 1 champions also won the Vietnamese Cup, then the league runners-up provide the opposition. The fixture was first played in the 1998–99 season and is currently organized by Vietnam Professional Football JSC.

The current holders is Cong An Hanoi, who defeated the 2026 Vietnamese Cup winner Cong An Ho Chi Minh City 5–0 in the 2026 fixture.

== Results ==
Matches went to penalties with no extra time played.

Vietnamese Super Cup winners
Year	Winners	Score	Runners-up	Venue	Attendance	Ref(s)
1999	The Cong	3–0	Cong An Ho Chi Minh City	Hanoi Stadium	—N/a	
2000	Song Lam Nghe An	2–0	Saigon Port	Hanoi Stadium	—N/a	
2001	Song Lam Nghe An	1–1	Cong An Ho Chi Minh City	Thống Nhất Stadium	—N/a	
2001	Song Lam Nghe An	2–0 (replay)	Cong An Ho Chi Minh City	Vinh Stadium	—N/a	
2002	Song Lam Nghe An	5–2	Saigon Port	Vinh Stadium	—N/a	
2003	Hoang Anh Gia Lai	1–1	Binh Dinh	Quy Nhơn Stadium	—N/a	
2003	Hoang Anh Gia Lai	2–1 (replay)	Binh Dinh	Pleiku Stadium	—N/a	
2004	Hoang Anh Gia Lai	3–1	Hoa Lâm Binh Dinh	Lạch Tray Stadium	—N/a	
2005	Mitsustar Haiphong	2–1	Gạch Đồng Tâm Long An	Lạch Tray Stadium	—N/a	
2006	Gạch Đồng Tâm Long An	2–0	Hòa Phát Hà Nội	Long An Stadium	—N/a	
2007	Becamex Binh Duong	3–1	Dam Phu My Nam Định	Gò Đậu Stadium	—N/a	
2008	Becamex Binh Duong	4–0	Hanoi ACB	Gò Đậu Stadium	18,000	
2009	Lam Son Thanh Hoa	1–1 (4–3 pen.)	SHB Da Nang	Ninh Bình Stadium	5,000	
2010	Hanoi T&T	2–2 (4–2 pen.)	Song Lam Nghe An	Hàng Đẫy Stadium	3,000	
2011	Song Lam Nghe An	1–1 (3–1 pen.)	Navibank Saigon	Vinh Stadium	12,000	
2012	SHB Da Nang	4–0	Xuan Thanh Saigon	Chi Lăng Stadium	10,000	
2013	Vissai Ninh Bình	2–2 (5–4 pen.)	Hanoi T&T	Ninh Bình Stadium	5,000	
2014	Becamex Binh Duong	1–0	Haiphong	Gò Đậu Stadium	8,000	
2015	Becamex Binh Duong	2–0	Hanoi T&T	Thanh Hóa Stadium	2,000	
2016	Hanoi T&T	3–3	Than Quang Ninh	Hàng Đẫy Stadium	4,000	
2017	QNK Quang Nam	1–0	Hanoi FC	Hàng Đẫy Stadium	15,000	
2018	Hanoi FC	2–0	Becamex Binh Duong	Hàng Đẫy Stadium	12,000	
2019	Hanoi FC	2–1	Ho Chi Minh City FC	Hàng Đẫy Stadium	200	
2020	Hanoi FC	1–0	Viettel	Thống Nhất Stadium	4,200	
2021	Cancelled					
2022	Hanoi FC	2–0	Haiphong	Hàng Đẫy Stadium	10,000	
2023	Dong A Thanh Hoa	2–0	Cong An Hanoi	Hàng Đẫy Stadium	7,000	
2024	Thep Xanh Nam Dinh	3–0	Dong A Thanh Hoa	Thiên Trường Stadium	18,000	
2025	Cong An Hanoi	3–2	Thep Xanh Nam Dinh	Thiên Trường Stadium	15,000	
2026	Cong An Hanoi	5–0	Cong An Ho Chi Minh City	Hàng Đẫy Stadium	15,120	

== Winners ==
=== Multiple winners ===
No.	Team	Years
5	Hà Nội	2010, 2018, 2019, 2020, 2022
4	Sông Lam Nghệ An	2000, 2001, 2002, 2011
4	Becamex Bình Dương	2007, 2008, 2014, 2015
2	Hoàng Anh Gia Lai	2003, 2004
2	Thanh Hóa	2009, 2023
2	Cong An Hanoi	2025, 2026

== See also ==
- Football in Vietnam
