= Hanoi FC Reserves and Academy =

Hanoi FC Rerserves and Academy
- Full name: Hanoi Football Club Rerserves and Academy
- Founded: 2006
- Ground: Thanh Trì Stadium
- Capacity: 4,000
- Owner(s): T&T Sports JSC
- Chairman: Đỗ Vinh Quang
- Website: http://hanoifc.com.vn
Home colours	Away colours

The Hanoi Football Club Reserves & Academy (Vietnamese: Trung tâm đào tạo bóng đá trẻ Hà Nội FC) are the reserve team and academy of Vietnamese team Hanoi FC, based in Hanoi. The team recently won the promotion to the 2026–27 V.League 2, but transferred their participation slot to Thái Nguyên.

== History and operations ==
After Hanoi T&T Football Club was established in 2006, the team's youth academy was inaugurated. The academy received training for a large number of players from the Hanoi Sports Center in Gia Lâm, Hanoi. In 2012, the academy merged with the VSH Academy owned by former Vietnamese international Văn Sỹ Hùng in Nghệ An and turned it into a satellite academy of the main academy. The VSH branch would only train players under-15 and promised young talents would be transferred to the Hanoi Center for higher training. In 2022, the club opened another satellite youth academy in Bắc Giang.

Hanoi FC sent many scouts to many localities in the North. Scouts closely followed youth tournaments in many provinces to discover players with high potential from the age of 11 to welcome them into the centralized accommodation at Hanoi's youth training center.

The team's training method is done scientifically, with connections between the age categories, ensuring the continuous and unified development of the players. The team builds a tight connection with its satellite academies, unifying the playing style of the players and the management apparatus. All exercises and development plans are aimed at building the football philosophy of the club's first team. The coaches in the Hanoi FC youth academy are required to have at least an AFC Pro Diploma.

With several achievements at Vietnamese youth football tournaments and the number of alumni players that became Vietnamese internationals, the Hanoi FC football academy is considered as one of the best football academies in Vietnam and in Southeast Asia. In the 2023 V.League 1 season, the Hanoi FC academy had the most former academy players competing in the league.

== Honours ==
=== Senior ===
- V.League 2

(silver) Runners-up : 2018

- Vietnamese Second Division

Group winners : 2019, 2026
Group runners-up : 2017

- Vietnamese Third Division

Group winners : 2018
Group runners-up : 2015, 2017, 2023

=== Youth ===
- Vietnam National U-21 Championship

(gold) Winners : 2013, 2015, 2016, 2018, 2019, 2022
(silver) Runners-up : 2014, 2021
(bronze) Third place : 2009, 2023, 2025, 2026

- Vietnam National U-19 Championship

(gold) Winners : 2011, 2014, 2016, 2017, 2019, 2022, 2024
(silver) Runners-up : 2015, 2018
(bronze) Third place : 2013, 2023, 2025–26

- Vietnam National U-17 Championship

(gold) Winners : 2024, 2025
(silver) Runners-up : 2014
(bronze) Third place : 2013, 2016, 2022, 2026

- Vietnam National U-15 Championship

(gold) Winners: 2026
(silver) Runners-up: 2011, 2012, 2016, 2019, 2025
(bronze) Third place: 2014, 2015

== Current squad ==
The following players were registered for the 2026 Vietnamese Second Division.

As of 20 March 2026

Note: Flags indicate national team as defined under FIFA eligibility rules; some limited exceptions apply. Players may hold more than one non-FIFA nationality.

No.	Pos.	Nation	Player
—	GK	VIE	Nguyễn Bỉnh Quang Vinh
—	GK	VIE	Chu Bá Huấn
—	GK	VIE	Nguyễn Đức Mạnh
—	GK	VIE	Nguyễn Thái Sơn
—	DF	VIE	Vi Văn Dũng
—	DF	VIE	Nguyễn Sỹ Đức
—	DF	VIE	Nguyễn Cảnh Tài
—	DF	VIE	Đỗ Minh Quân
—	DF	VIE	Chử Ngọc Diệp
—	DF	VIE	Lê Thanh Tâm
—	DF	VIE	Nguyễn Trung Hiếu
—	DF	VIE	Phạm Đức Duy
—	DF	VIE	Nguyễn Văn Quân
—	MF	VIE	Nguyễn Anh Tú
—	MF	VIE	Nguyễn Trung Thành

No.	Pos.	Nation	Player
—	MF	VIE	Hoàng Văn Tuyến
—	MF	VIE	Đoàn Phú Quý
—	MF	VIE	Nguyễn Xuân Toàn
—	MF	VIE	Đỗ Thành Đạt
—	MF	VIE	Dương Đình Nguyên
—	MF	VIE	Phạm Anh Tuấn
—	MF	VIE	Nguyễn Tiến Đạt
—	MF	VIE	Đậu Hồng Phong
—	MF	VIE	Hà Huy Phúc
—	MF	VIE	Bùi Tuấn Anh
—	FW	VIE	Lê Trí Phong
—	FW	VIE	Nguyễn Đình Thịnh
—	FW	VIE	Nguyễn Anh Tuấn
—	FW	VIE	Nguyễn Thiên Phú

== Management ==
Role	Name
Academy Director	Đinh Thế Nam
Head coach	Phạm Minh Đức
Assistant Coach	Hoàng Ngọc Hào; Trần Doãn Dũng; Trần Quốc Trung

== Notable alumni ==
Below is a non-exhaustive list of notable players who trained in the youth or reserve teams of Hanoi FC. Players in bold are those who capped for their National team.

- (Vietnam) **Bùi Hoàng Việt Anh**
- (Vietnam) Chu Ngọc Nguyễn Lực
- (Vietnam) Đào Duy Khánh
- (Vietnam) Đào Văn Nam
- (Vietnam) Đặng Văn Tới
- (Vietnam) Đậu Văn Toàn
- (Vietnam) **Đỗ Duy Mạnh**
- (Vietnam) **Đỗ Hùng Dũng**
- (Vietnam) Đỗ Sỹ Huy
- (Vietnam) **Đoàn Văn Hậu**
- (Vietnam) Lê Văn Hà
- (Vietnam) **Lê Văn Xuân**
- (Vietnam) Lê Xuân Tú
- (Vietnam) Lương Duy Cương
- (Vietnam) **Lý Công Hoàng Anh**
- (Vietnam) Mạch Ngọc Hà
- (Vietnam) **Ngân Văn Đại**
- (Vietnam) Ngô Đức Hoàng
- (Vietnam) Nguyễn Anh Tiệp
- (Vietnam) **Nguyễn Đình Triệu**
- (Vietnam) Nguyễn Đức Anh
- (Vietnam) Nguyễn Hồng Sơn
- (Vietnam) Nguyễn Hữu Phúc
- (Vietnam) Nguyễn Hữu Sơn
- (Vietnam) Nguyễn Nam Anh
- (Vietnam) **Nguyễn Quang Hải**
- (Vietnam) **Nguyễn Thành Chung**
- (Vietnam) Nguyễn Văn Công
- (Vietnam) Nguyễn Văn Đức
- (Vietnam) Nguyễn Văn Dũng
- (Vietnam) Nguyễn Văn Hoàng
- (Vietnam) Nguyễn Văn Minh
- (Vietnam) **Nguyễn Văn Trường**
- (Vietnam) **Nguyễn Văn Tùng**
- (Vietnam) **Nguyễn Văn Vĩ**
- (Vietnam) Nguyễn Xuân Nam
- (Vietnam) **Phạm Đức Huy**
- (Vietnam) **Phạm Tuấn Hải**
- (Vietnam) Phạm Văn Thành
- (Vietnam) Phạm Văn Thuần
- (Vietnam) **Phí Minh Long**
- (Vietnam) Quan Văn Chuẩn
- (Vietnam) **Sầm Ngọc Đức**
- (Vietnam) Thân Thành Tín
- (Vietnam) **Trần Đình Trọng**
- (Vietnam) Trần Văn Đạt
- (Vietnam) **Trần Văn Kiên**
- (Vietnam) Trịnh Duy Long
- (Vietnam) Vũ Đình Hai
- (Vietnam) Vũ Tiến Long
- (Vietnam) Vũ Văn Sơn

== Domestic record ==
The season-by-season performance of Hà Nội B in the Vietnamese football league system:

Season	Pld	Won	Draw	Lost	GF	GA	GD	PTS	Final position	Notes
2015 Third Division	5	3	1	1	9	6	+3	10	2nd (Group A)	Promoted to Second Division
2016 Second Division	12	4	5	3	15	14	+1	17	3rd (Group A)	
2017 Second Division	14	10	2	2	38	10	+28	32	2nd (Group A)	Promoted to V.League 2 as play-offs winners
2018 V.League 2	18	8	7	3	32	20	+12	31	2nd	Defeated in promotion play-offs Transferred the team to Hồng Lĩnh Hà Tĩnh at the end of the season
2018 Third Division	3	2	1	0	3	1	+2	7	1st	Promoted to Second Division
2019 Second Division	12	7	4	1	30	9	+21	25	1st (Group A)	Defeated in promotion play-offs Merged the team to Tuấn Tú Phú Thọ at the end of the season
2022 Third Division	5	2	2	1	7	5	+2	8	4th (Group A)	
2023 Third Division	8	5	2	1	15	6	+9	17	2nd (Group A)	Promoted to Second Division
2024 Second Division	12	3	4	5	9	13	-4	13	4th (Group A)	
2025 Second Division	10	2	1	7	7	17	-10	7	5th (Group A)	
2026 Second Division	12	6	6	0	19	7	+12	24	1st (Group A)	Promoted to V.League 2 as play-offs winners Transferred the team to Thái Nguyên at the end of the season
