= 2023 Hanoi FC season =

Hanoi FC
2023 season
- Owner: T&T Sports Joint Stock Company
- Chairman: Do Vinh Quang
- Head Coach: Božidar Bandović
- Stadium: Hang Day Stadium
- V.League 1: 2nd out of 14
- National Cup: Round 1/8
- National Super Cup: Champion
- Top goalscorer: League: Nguyen Van Quyet (6 goals); All: Nguyen Van Quyet (6 goals)
- Highest home attendance: 14,000 vs Hanoi Police (February 9, 2023)
- Lowest home attendance: 5,000 vs SHB Da Nang (May 22, 2023)
- Average home league attendance: 8,250
| Home colours | Away colours | Third colours |
- All statistics correct as of April 18, 2023.

The 2023 season is the 18th season in the history of Hanoi FC and the 15th season. consecutively the team competed in V.League 1, the highest level football tournament in the Vietnamese football league system.

This is also the season that Hanoi FC as the defending champion 2022 V.League 1 and 2022 Vietnamese Cup will also compete in the match Vietnamese Super Cup 2022.

== Friendly matches ==
=== Lienvietpostbank Cup ===
| 12 tháng 1 năm 2023 | Hanoi FC | 2–1 | Viettel | Đống Đa, Hà Nội |
| 15:30 | Minh Tuấn 16'; Thành Lương 50' | | Văn Khang 83' | Stadium: Hàng Đẫy; Referee: Trần Văn Lập |

| 14 tháng 1 năm 2023 | Hanoi FC | 0–4 | Cong An Hanoi | Đống Đa, Hà Nội |
| 18:30 | | | Georgijević 51'; Tấn Tài 66'; Tsoumou 72' (pen.); Xuân Nam 84' | Stadium: Hàng Đẫy; Referee: Nguyễn Đình Thái |

| 16 tháng 1 năm 2023 | Hanoi FC | 1–0 | Haiphong FC | Đống Đa, Hà Nội |
| 15:30 | Lucão 58' | | | Stadium: Hàng Đẫy; Referee: Lê Đức Cảnh |

== Vietnamese Super Cup ==
Hanoi FC officially started the 2023 season with the Vietnam Super Cup match against Haiphong FC at Hang Day Stadium on January 29, 2023. This is also the official debut of the new coach Božidar Bandović. .With the goals of Lucão and Tran Van Kien, Hanoi defeated Haiphong FC to win the 2022 National Super Cup and also became the club that won the most Vietnamese Super Cups with 5 times.

| January 29, 2023 | Hanoi FC | 2–0 | Haiphong FC | Dong Da, Hanoi |
| 17:00 | Lucão 26'; Van Kien 76' | | | Stadium: Hang Day; Attendance: 10,000; Referee: Nguyen Dinh Thai |

=== Overall record ===
| Competition | First match | Last match | Starting round | Final position | Record | | | | | | | |
| Competition | First match | Last match | Starting round | Final position | Pld | W | D | L | GF | GA | GD | Win % |
|---|---|---|---|---|---|---|---|---|---|---|---|---|
| 2023 V.League 1 | February 5, 2023 | — | First round | | 8 | 4 | 3 | 1 | 14 | 8 | +6 | 50.00 |
| 2023 Vietnamese Cup | September 2023 | — | Round of 1/8 | | 0 | 0 | 0 | 0 | 0 | 0 | +0 | — |
| Vietnamese Super Cup | January 21, 2023 | | Final | Champion | 1 | 1 | 0 | 0 | 2 | 0 | +2 | 100.00 |
| Total | | | | | 9 | 5 | 3 | 1 | 16 | 8 | +8 | 55.56 |

Last updated: April 18, 2023
Source: Competitions

=== Player stats ===
| Shirt number | Position | Player | V.League 1 | | Vietnamese Cup | | Vietnamese Super Cup | | Total | |
| Shirt number | Position | Player | Matches | Scores | Matches | Scores | Matches | Scores | Matches | Scores |
|---|---|---|---|---|---|---|---|---|---|---|
| 1 | GK | (Vietnam) Bùi Tấn Trường | 6(0) | 0 | 0 | 0 | 1(0) | 0 | 7(0) | 0 |
| 2 | DF | (Vietnam) Đỗ Duy Mạnh | 5(0) | 1 | 0 | 0 | 1(0) | 0 | 6(0) | 1 |
| 6 | MF | (Vietnam) Vũ Minh Tuấn | 0(3) | 0 | 0 | 0 | 0 | 0 | 0(3) | 0 |
| 7 | FW | (Brazil) Lucão do Break | 7(0) | 3 | 0 | 0 | 1(0) | 1 | 8(0) | 4 |
| 8 | MF | (Vietnam) Đậu Văn Toàn | 4(1) | 0 | 0 | 0 | 0(1) | 0 | 4(2) | 0 |
| 9 | FW | (Vietnam) Phạm Tuấn Hải | 3(4) | 1 | 0 | 0 | 0(1) | 0 | 3(5) | 1 |
| 10 | FW | (Vietnam) Nguyễn Văn Quyết | 7(0) | 6 | 0 | 0 | 1(0) | 0 | 8(0) | 6 |
| 11 | MF | (Vietnam) Phạm Thành Lương | 0(1) | 0 | 0 | 0 | 0 | 0 | 0(1) | 0 |
| 13 | DF | (Vietnam) Trần Văn Kiên | 5(1) | 0 | 0 | 0 | 1(0) | 1 | 6(1) | 1 |
| 14 | MF | (Vietnam) Nguyễn Hai Long | 0(3) | 0 | 0 | 0 | 0 | 0 | 0(3) | 0 |
| 15 | DF | (Vietnam) Nguyễn Đức Anh | 0 | 0 | 0 | 0 | 0 | 0 | 0 | 0 |
| 16 | DF | (Vietnam) Nguyễn Thành Chung | 6(0) | 0 | 0 | 0 | 1(0) | 0 | 7(0) | 0 |
| 18 | GK | (Vietnam) Nguyễn Văn Công | 0 | 0 | 0 | 0 | 0 | 0 | 0 | 0 |
| 19 | MF | (Vietnam) Nguyễn Văn Trường | 0(1) | 0 | 0 | 0 | 0 | 0 | 0(1) | 0 |
| 20 | DF | (Vietnam) Bùi Hoàng Việt Anh | 7(0) | 0 | 0 | 0 | 1(0) | 0 | 8(0) | 0 |
| 22 | MF | (Vietnam) Mạch Ngọc Hà | 0(2) | 0 | 0 | 0 | 0(1) | 0 | 0(3) | 0 |
| 24 | DF | (Vietnam) Vũ Văn Sơn | 0 | 0 | 0 | 0 | 0 | 0 | 0 | 0 |
| 25 | FW | (Vietnam) Lê Xuân Tú | 2(2) | 0 | 0 | 0 | 0(1) | 0 | 2(3) | 0 |
| 27 | DF | (Vietnam) Vũ Tiến Long | 2(3) | 0 | 0 | 0 | 0 | 0 | 2(3) | 0 |
| 37 | GK | (Vietnam) Quan Văn Chuẩn | 1(0) | 0 | 0 | 0 | 0 | 0 | 1(0) | 0 |
| 45 | DF | (Vietnam) Lê Văn Xuân | 0 | 0 | 0 | 0 | 0 | 0 | 0 | 0 |
| 52 | DF | (Vietnam) Nguyễn Văn Vĩ | 4(0) | 0 | 0 | 0 | 1(0) | 0 | 5(0) | 0 |
| 65 | MF | (Vietnam) Trần Văn Đạt | 0 | 0 | 0 | 0 | 0 | 0 | 0 | 0 |
| 66 | DF | (Vietnam) Nguyễn Văn Dũng | 0 | 0 | 0 | 0 | 0 | 0 | 0 | 0 |
| 70 | FW | (Brazil) William Henrique | 4(0) | 0 | 0 | 0 | 1(0) | 0 | 5(0) | 0 |
| 74 | MF | (Vietnam) Trương Văn Thái Quý | 0(1) | 0 | 0 | 0 | 1(0) | 0 | 1(1) | 0 |
| 77 | MF | (Brazil) Marcão Silva | 7(0) | 0 | 0 | 0 | 0 | 0 | 7(0) | 0 |
| 88 | MF | (Vietnam) Đỗ Hùng Dũng | 7(0) | 1 | 0 | 0 | 1(0) | 0 | 8(0) | 1 |
| 89 | FW | (Vietnam) Nguyễn Văn Tùng | 0 | 0 | 0 | 0 | 0 | 0 | 0 | 0 |

=== Goalscorers ===
| # | Players | V.League 1 | Vietnamese Cup | Vietnamese Super Cup | All |
|---|---|---|---|---|---|
| 1 | (Vietnam) Nguyễn Văn Quyết | 6 | 0 | 0 | 6 |
| 2 | (Brazil) Lucão do Break | 3 | 0 | 1 | 4 |
| 3 | (Vietnam) Trần Văn Kiên | 0 | 0 | 1 | 1 |
| 3 | (Vietnam) Đỗ Hùng Dũng | 1 | 0 | 0 | 1 |
| 3 | (Vietnam) Đỗ Duy Mạnh | 1 | 0 | 0 | 1 |
| 3 | (Vietnam) Phạm Tuấn Hải | 1 | 0 | 0 | 1 |
| Cầu thủ đối phương phản lưới nhà | | 1 | 0 | 0 | 1 |

== Competition ==
=== Matches ===
Win Draw Loss Unplayed

| February 5, 2023 1 - Phase1 | Viettel | 1–1 | Hanoi FC | Dong Da, Hanoi |
| 19:15 | Danh Trung 86' | Report | Van Quyet 69' (pen.) | Stadium: Hang Day; Attendance: 5,000; Referee: Nguyen Manh Hai |

| February 9, 2023 2 - Phase1 | Hanoi FC | 2–0 | Hanoi Police | Dong Da, Hanoi |
| 19:15 | Van Quyet 71', 82' | Report | | Stadium: Hang Day; Attendance: 14,000; Referee: Nguyen Dinh Thai |

| February 13, 2023 3 - Phase1 | Hong Linh Ha Tinh | 2–3 | Hanoi FC | Ha Tinh |
| 18:00 | Diallo 11', 56' | Report | Van Quyet 15'; Hung Dung 23'; Duy Manh 50' | Stadium: Ha Tinh; Attendance: 5,000; Referee: Le Vu Linh |

| February 17, 2023 4 - Phase1 | Hanoi FC | 0–0 | Dong A Thanh Hoa | Dong Da, Hanoi |
| 19:15 | | Report | | Stadium: Hang Day; Attendance: 8,000; Referee: Tran Dinh Thinh |

| April 8, 2023 5 - Phase1 | Ho Chi Minh City FC | 1–3 | Hanoi FC | District 10, Ho Chi Minh City |
| 19:15 | Mansaray 46' | Report | Lucão 38'; Tuan Hai 50'; Campbell 90+3' (o.g.) | Stadium: Thong Nhat Stadium; Attendance: 5,000; Referee: Nguyen Dinh Thai |

| April 13, 2023 6 - Phase1 | Hanoi FC | 3–0 | Haiphong FC | Dong Da, Hanoi |
| 19:15 | Van Quyet 2' (pen.), 37'; Lucão 80' | Report | | Stadium: Hang Day; Attendance: 6,000; Referee: Nguyen Viet Duan |

| April 17, 2023 7 - Phase1 | Topenland Binh Dinh | 3–1 | Hanoi FC | Quy Nhon, Binh Dinh |
| 18:00 | Rafaelson 44', 62' (pen.), 90+4' | Report | Lucão 49' | Stadium: Quy Nhon; Attendance: 6,500; Referee: Nguyen Manh Hai |

| May 22, 2023 8 - Phase1 | Hanoi FC | 1–1 | SHB Da Nang | Dong Da, Hanoi |
| 19:15 | Phạm Tuấn Hải 10' | Report | Lucão do Break (o.g.) 45' | Stadium: Hang Day; Attendance: 5,000; Referee: Tran Ngoc Nho |

| May 27, 2023 9 - Phase1 | Becamex Binh Duong | 1–1 | Hanoi FC | Thu Dau Mot, Binh Duong |
| 17:00 | Nguyễn Tiến Linh 73' | Report | Nguyễn Văn Tùng 82' | Stadium: Binh Duong; Attendance: 3,500; Referee: Hoàng Thanh Bình |

| May 31, 2023 10 - Phase1 | Hoang Anh Gia Lai | 1–0 | Hanoi FC | Pleiku, Gia Lai |
| 17:00 | Paollo Madeira Oliveira 6' (pen.) | Report | | Stadium: Pleiku; Attendance: 6,000; Referee: Trần Văn Lập |

| June 4, 2023 11 - Phase1 | Hanoi FC | 1–0 | Thep Xanh Nam Dinh | Dong Da, Hanoi |
| 19:15 | Phạm Tuấn Hải 42' | Report | | Stadium: Hang Day; Attendance: 5,000; Referee: Nguyễn Đình Thái |

| June 23, 2023 12 - Phase1 | Khanh Hoa FC | – | Hanoi FC | Nha Trang, Khanh Hoa |
| 17:00 | | Report | | Stadium: August 19th |

| July 2, 2023 13 - Phase1 | Hanoi FC | – | Song Lam Nghe An | Dong Da, Hanoi |
| 17:00 | | Report | | Stadium: Hang Day |

=== Table ===
| Pos | Team | Pld | W | D | L | GF | GA | GD | Pts | Promotion or relegation |
|---|---|---|---|---|---|---|---|---|---|---|
| 1 | Cong An Hanoi | 13 | 7 | 3 | 3 | 29 | 15 | +14 | 24 | Qualification to Championship round |
| 2 | Dong A Thanh Hoa | 13 | 6 | 5 | 2 | 20 | 15 | +5 | 23 | Qualification to Championship round |
| 3 | Hanoi FC | 13 | 6 | 4 | 3 | 18 | 12 | +6 | 22 | Qualification to Championship round |
| 4 | Viettel | 13 | 5 | 6 | 2 | 14 | 11 | +3 | 21 | Qualification to Championship round |
| 5 | Haiphong FC | 13 | 4 | 7 | 2 | 14 | 13 | +1 | 19 | Qualification to Championship round |

Updated to match(es) played on 17 April 2023. Source: VPF
Rules for classification: 1) Points; 2) Goal difference; 3) Goals scored; 4) Disciplinary points; 5) Play-off (Only to decide champions, runners-up, third placed and relegation spots); 6) Drawing of lots

| Pos | Team | Pld | W | D | L | GF | GA | GD | Pts | Qualification | HNP | HAN | VTL | DTH | TND | HPG | TBD | HHT |
|---|---|---|---|---|---|---|---|---|---|---|---|---|---|---|---|---|---|---|
| 1 | Cong An Hanoi (C) | 20 | 11 | 5 | 4 | 39 | 21 | +18 | 38 | Qualification for the ASEAN Club Championship | — | 2–1 | | 1–1 | | 0–2 | | 1–1 |
| 2 | Hanoi FC | 20 | 11 | 5 | 4 | 35 | 22 | +13 | 38 | | | — | 2–1 | | 1–0 | 3–1 | 4–2 | |
| 3 | Viettel | 20 | 8 | 8 | 4 | 23 | 17 | +6 | 32 | | 0–3 | | — | | | 2–0 | 0–0 | 4–0 |
| 4 | Dong A Thanh Hoa | 20 | 8 | 7 | 5 | 27 | 22 | +5 | 31 | Qualification to the ASEAN Club Championship (Note: Dong A Thanh Hoa qualified for the ASEAN Club Championship group stage as the 2023 Vietnamese Cup winners.) | | 1–3 | 0–1 | — | 0–2 | | 2–0 | |
| 5 | Thep Xanh Nam Dinh | 20 | 7 | 8 | 5 | 19 | 19 | 0 | 29 | | 1–2 | | 0–0 | | — | | | 2–0 |

Updated to match(es) played on 10 August 2023. Source: VPF
Rules for classification: 1) Points; 2) Goal difference; 3) Goals scored; 4) Disciplinary points; 5) Play-off (Only to decide champions, runners-up, third placed and relegation spots); 6) Drawing of lots
(C) Champions
Notes:

| Pos | Team | Pld | W | D | L | GF | GA | GD | Pts | Relegation | SNA | HGL | KHA | BBD | HCM | SDN |
|---|---|---|---|---|---|---|---|---|---|---|---|---|---|---|---|---|
| 9 | Song Lam Nghe An | 18 | 6 | 7 | 5 | 19 | 20 | −1 | 25 | | — | 1–0 | | 0–2 | 2–0 | |
| 10 | Hoang Anh Gia Lai | 18 | 5 | 8 | 5 | 19 | 19 | 0 | 23 | | | — | 1–0 | | 0–1 | 1–0 |
| 11 | Khanh Hoa | 18 | 4 | 7 | 7 | 18 | 22 | −4 | 19 | | 3–1 | | — | | 3–0 | 1–3 |
| 12 | Becamex Binh Duong | 18 | 2 | 9 | 7 | 19 | 23 | −4 | 15 | | | 0–1 | 3–0 | — | | |
| 13 | Ho Chi Minh City | 18 | 4 | 3 | 11 | 21 | 32 | −11 | 15 | | | | | 0–0 | — | 1–0 |
| 14 | SHB Da Nang (R) | 18 | 2 | 8 | 8 | 11 | 19 | −8 | 14 | Relegation to V.League 2 | 0–1 | | | 0–0 | | — |

Source: VPF
Rules for classification: 1) Points; 2) Head-to-head points 3) Goal difference; 4) Goals scored; 5) Disciplinary points; 6) Play-off (Only to decide champions, runners-up, third placed and relegation spots); 7) Drawing of lots
(R) Relegated

=== Result summary ===
| Overall | | | | | | | | Home | | | | | | Away | | | | | |
| Pld | W | D | L | GF | GA | GD | Pts | W | D | L | GF | GA | GD | W | D | L | GF | GA | GD |
|---|---|---|---|---|---|---|---|---|---|---|---|---|---|---|---|---|---|---|---|
| 9 | 4 | 4 | 1 | 15 | 9 | +6 | 16 | 2 | 2 | 0 | 6 | 1 | +5 | 2 | 2 | 1 | 9 | 8 | +1 |

=== Results by round ===
| Round | 1 | 2 | 3 | 4 | 5 | 6 | 7 | 8 | 9 |
|---|---|---|---|---|---|---|---|---|---|
| Ground | A | H | A | H | A | H | A | H | |
| Result | D | W | W | D | W | W | L | D | |
| Position | 8 | 2 | 1 | 2 | 1 | 1 | 2 | 2 | |

Updated to match(es) played on 8 May 2023. Source:
A = Away; H = Home; W = Win; D = Draw; L = Loss

=== Vietnamese Cup ===
| 2023 Round Of 16 | Hanoi FC | v | Viettel | Hanoi |
| | | | | Stadium: Hang Day Stadium |
