= Nguyễn Văn Trường =

Vietnamese footballer (born 2003)

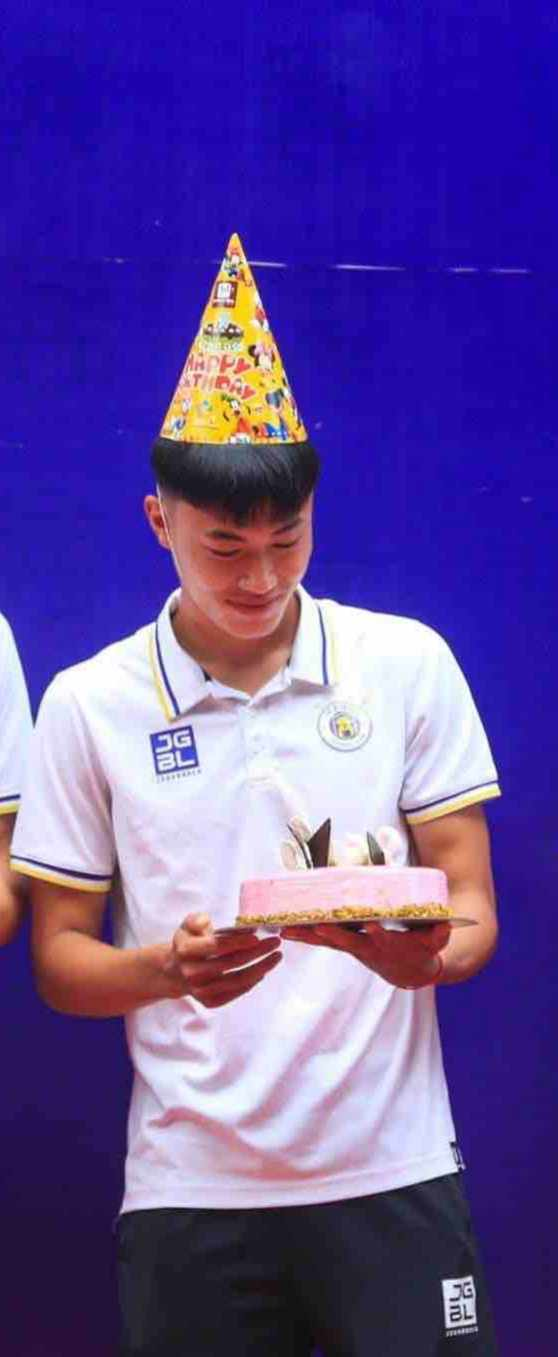
- Văn Trường celebrating his 20th birthday in 2023

Personal information
- Full name: Nguyễn Văn Trường
- Date of birth: 10 September 2003 (age 23)
- Place of birth: Văn Giang, Hưng Yên, Vietnam
- Height: 1.82 m (6 ft 0 in)
- Positions: Attacking midfielder; winger

Team information
- Current team: Hà Nội
- Number: 19

Youth career
- 2019–2022: Hà Nội

Senior career*
Years	Team	Apps	(Gls)
2023–	Hà Nội	56	(0)

International career^{‡}
2022–2023	Vietnam U20	13	(3)
2022–2025	Vietnam U23	34	(0)
2024–	Vietnam	7	(0)
Medal record
Men's football
Representing Vietnam
SEA Games
Bronze medal – third place	Phnom Penh 2023	Team
ASEAN U-23 Championship
Winner	Thailand 2023
Winner	Indonesia 2025
AFF U-19 Youth Championship
Third place	Indonesia 2022
- * Club domestic league appearances and goals as of 10 November 2025 ‡ National team caps and goals as of 12 November 2025

Nguyễn Văn Trường (born 10 September 2003) is a Vietnamese professional footballer who plays as an attacking midfielder or a winger for Hà Nội and the Vietnam national team.

== Early career ==
Văn Trường is a product of Hanoi FC youth academy. At the Vietnamese National U-19 Football Championship 2022, Văn Trường scored a goal from close to the halfway line to help Hanoi U19 defeat Viettel U19 2–1 in the final, and therefore win the tournament. In December 2022, he helped Hà Nội U-21 winning their sixth National U-21 Championship title, and was therefore awarded the "Best player of the tournament" award.

== Club career ==
=== Hanoi FC ===
Following his great performances with Hanoi youth teams and Vietnam youth national teams, Văn Trường was promoted to Hanoi FC's first team for the 2023 season. He was given the number 19 shirt last worn by Nguyễn Quang Hải. On 13 April, he made his debut as a substitute for Đậu Văn Toàn in a 3–0 home league win over rivals Hải Phòng.

== International career ==
Youth

Văn Trường was called up to Vietnam under-23 for the 2022 AFC U-23 Championship. He played in all 4 matches during the tournament, and impressed the Vietnamese media by his mobility, his impressive height and his ability to retain possession.

In July 2022, Văn Trường participated 2022 AFF U-19 Youth Championship with Vietnam under-19. He played in every match and scored a goal against Philippines in group stage. Vietnam U19 finished third at the tournament.

Văn Trường participated in the 2023 AFC U-20 Championship and scored a victorious 90th minute header against Qatar in Vietnam's second match in the group stage. Despite winning two out three of their group stage matches, Vietnam only finished third out of four teams in the group and was eliminated from the tournament.

In late April 2023, Văn Trường was included by coach Philippe Troussier in Vietnam under-22's 20 men squad for the 2023 Southeast Asian Games. Later, he took part in Vietnam U23's successful campaign in the 2023 AFF U-23 Championship, winning their second title in the history.

Senior

On 9 January 2024, he made his international debut, playing 30 minutes in Vietnam's 1–2 defeat against Kyrgyzstan. Later, he was named in Vietnam's 26-men squad for the 2023 AFC Asian Cup.

== Career statistics ==
=== Club ===
As of match played 10 November 2025

Appearances and goals by club, season and competition
Club	Season	League			Cup		Asia		Other		Total	
Club	Season	Division	Apps	Goals	Apps	Goals	Apps	Goals	Apps	Goals	Apps	Goals
Hanoi FC	2023	V.League 1	9	0	1	0	—		—		10	0
Hanoi FC	2023–24	V.League 1	23	0	2	0	2 (Note: Appearances in AFC Champions League)	0	—		27	0
Hanoi FC	2024–25	V.League 1	19	0	1	0	—		—		20	0
Hanoi FC	2025–26	V.League 1	5	0	1	0	—		—		6	0
Hanoi FC	Total		56	0	5	0	2	0	0	0	63	0
Total career			56	0	5	0	2	0	0	0	63	0

=== International ===
As of match played 12 October 2024

Appearances and goals by national team and year
National team	Year	Apps	Goals
Vietnam	2024	6	0
Total		6	0

== Honours ==
Hanoi Youth

- Vietnamese National U-19 Championship: 2022
- Vietnamese National U-21 Championship: 2022

Vietnam U19

- AFF U-19 Youth Championship: Third place: 2022
- International Thanh Niên Newspaper Cup: 2022

Vietnam U23

- SEA Games: Bronze medal: (bronze) 2023
- ASEAN U-23 Championship: 2023, 2025

Individual

- Vietnamese National U-21 Championship best player: 2022
