= 2018 Vietnamese National Football Third League =

Vietnamese National Football Third League
- Season: 2018
- Champions: Hà Nội C Hoàng Sang TP.HCM
- Promoted: Hà Nội C Hoàng Sang TP.HCM; SHB Đà Nẵng B
- Relegated: None
- Matches played: 12
- Goals scored: 30 (2.5 per match)

The 2018 Vietnamese National Football Third League was the 14th season of the Vietnamese National Football Third League. The season began on 22 October 2018 and finished on 31 October 2018.

== Rule ==
In this season, there are 8 teams divided geographically to 2 groups with 4 teams per group. The winner of each group and the best runner-up of both group promoted to Second League. The teams play each other once in a centralised venue.

== Team changes ==
The following teams have changed division since the 2017 season.

=== To Vietnamese Third League ===
Relegated from Vietnamese Second League

- Sanatech Khánh Hòa (withdrew)

New entrants

- Bắc Ninh UPES
- Hà Nội C
- Hà Nội Phù Đổng
- PVF
- Bình Điền
- Hoàng Sang TP.HCM
- SHB Đà Nẵng B

=== From Vietnamese Third League ===
Promoted to Vietnamese Second League

- Bà Rịa Vũng Tàu
- Nam Định B
- Vĩnh Long
- Quảng Ngãi

Withdrew

- Sanatech Khánh Hòa
- Công An Nhân Dân B
- Kiên Giang

== League table ==
=== Group A ===
Matches played in Bắc Ninh and Hà Nội.

| Pos | Team | Pld | W | D | L | GF | GA | GD | Pts | Qualification or relegation |
|---|---|---|---|---|---|---|---|---|---|---|
| 1 | Hà Nội C (P) | 3 | 2 | 1 | 0 | 3 | 1 | +2 | 7 | Promotion to Second League |
| 2 | Hà Nội Phù Đổng | 3 | 2 | 0 | 1 | 5 | 3 | +2 | 6 | |
| 3 | PVF | 3 | 1 | 1 | 1 | 2 | 2 | 0 | 4 | |
| 4 | Bắc Ninh UPES | 3 | 0 | 0 | 3 | 3 | 7 | −4 | 0 | |

Source: VFF
(P) Promoted

=== Group B ===
All matches played in Hồ Chí Minh City.

| Pos | Team | Pld | W | D | L | GF | GA | GD | Pts | Qualification or relegation |
|---|---|---|---|---|---|---|---|---|---|---|
| 1 | Hoàng Sang TP.HCM (P) | 3 | 2 | 1 | 0 | 6 | 4 | +2 | 7 | Promotion to Second League |
| 2 | SHB Đà Nẵng B (P) | 3 | 2 | 1 | 0 | 4 | 2 | +2 | 7 | Promotion to Second League |
| 3 | Bình Điền | 3 | 1 | 0 | 2 | 4 | 5 | −1 | 3 | |
| 4 | Đồng Nai | 3 | 0 | 0 | 3 | 3 | 6 | −3 | 0 | |

Source: VFF
(P) Promoted

== Matches ==
=== Matchday 1 ===
==== Group A ====
22 October 2018
15:00

| PVF | 0–2 | Hà Nội Phù Đổng |
|---|---|---|
| | VFF | Thái Minh Hiếu 37'; Bùi Anh Thống 48' |

Bắc Ninh UPES Stadium
Referee: Ngô Đắc Tiến

23 October 2018
15:00

| Bắc Ninh UPES | 1–2 | Hà Nội C |
|---|---|---|
| Đào Hoàng Giang 72' | VFF | Vũ Tiến Long 65'; Trần Văn Thắng 89' |

Bắc Ninh UPES Stadium
Referee: Trần Minh Hiếu

==== Group B ====
25 October 2018
15:00

| Hoàng Sang TP.HCM | 2–1 | Đồng Nai |
|---|---|---|
| Nguyễn Thanh Vị 12'; Đặng Văn Cảm 51' | VFF | Nghiêm Công Thành 25' |

Thống Nhất Stadium
Referee: Nguyễn Minh Tuấn

25 October 2018
17:45

| Bình Điền | 0–1 | SHB Đà Nẵng B |
|---|---|---|
| | VFF | Nguyễn Minh Khái 41' |

Thống Nhất Stadium
Referee: Lê Ngọc Lợi

=== Matchday 2 ===
==== Group A ====
26 October 2018
15:00

| Hà Nội Phù Đổng | 0–1 | Hà Nội C |
|---|---|---|
| | VFF | Vũ Tiến Long 49' |

Bắc Ninh UPES Stadium
Referee: Ngô Đức Trung

27 October 2018
15:00

| PVF | 2–0 | Bắc Ninh UPES |
|---|---|---|
| Nguyễn Kim Nhật 43', 59' | VFF |

Bắc Ninh UPES Stadium
Referee: Lê Quang Cường

==== Group B ====
28 October 2018
15:00

| Hoàng Sang TP.HCM | 3–2 | Bình Điền |
|---|---|---|
| | VFF |

Thống Nhất Stadium

28 October 2018
17:45

| Đồng Nai | 1–2 | SHB Đà Nẵng B |
|---|---|---|
| | VFF |

Thống Nhất Stadium

=== Matchday 3 ===
==== Group A ====
31 October 2018
15:00

| Hà Nội C | 0–0 | PVF |
|---|---|---|
| | VFF |

Việt Nam Football YTC Stadium
Referee: Ngô Đắc Tiến

31 October 2018
15:00

| Bắc Ninh UPES | 2–3 | Hà Nội Phù Đổng |
|---|---|---|
| Nguyễn Trung Hiếu 32', 37' | VFF | Thái Minh Hiếu 4', 87'; Thái Bảo Trung 90+1' |

Bắc Ninh UPES Stadium
Referee: Lê Quang Cường

==== Group B ====
31 October 2018
15:00

| SHB Đà Nẵng B | 1–1 | Hoàng Sang TP.HCM |
|---|---|---|
| Tạ Dương Anh Tuấn 51' | VFF | Lê Hoàng Anh 20' |

Thống Nhất Stadium
Referee: Nguyễn Hương Phước

31 October 2018
17:00

| Bình Điền | 2–1 | Đồng Nai |
|---|---|---|
| | VFF |

Thống Nhất Stadium

== See also ==
- 2018 V.League 1
- 2018 V.League 2
- 2018 Vietnamese National Football Second League
