= Nguyễn Thành Chung =

Vietnamese footballer (born 1997)

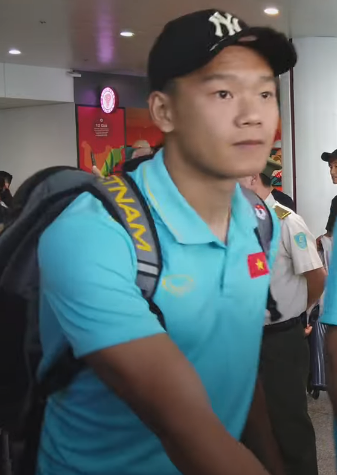
- Thanh Chung in 2019

Personal information
- Full name: Nguyễn Thành Chung
- Date of birth: 8 September 1997 (age 29)
- Place of birth: Yên Sơn, Tuyên Quang, Vietnam
- Height: 1.81 m (5 ft 11 in)
- Position: Centre-back

Team information
- Current team: Hà Nội
- Number: 16

Youth career
- 2007–2015: Hà Nội

Senior career*
Years	Team	Apps	(Gls)
2015	→ Công An Nhân Dân (loan)		
2016–	Hà Nội	189	(8)

International career^{‡}
2017–2020	Vietnam U23	18	(3)
2018–	Vietnam	46	(0)
Medal record
Men's football
Representing Vietnam
AFC U-23 Championship
Runner-up	China 2018
SEA Games
Gold medal – first place	Manila 2019	Team
ASEAN Championship
Runner-up	ASEAN 2022	Team
Winner	ASEAN 2024	Team
- * Club domestic league appearances and goals as of 7 November 2026 ‡ National team caps and goals as of 17 November 2026

Nguyễn Thành Chung (born 8 September 1997) is a Vietnamese professional footballer who plays as a centre-back for V.League 1 club Hà Nội and the Vietnam national team.

== Club career ==
=== Hanoi T&T Youth Team ===
During his time at the Hanoi T&T youth team, Nguyễn Thành Chung wore the number 18 shirt for the U-17, U-19, and U-21 teams. Playing as a defender, he also managed to score several goals, including a double against U-19 Song Lam Nghe An, and a goal that made it 3–0 for the Hanoi team in the semi-final of the 2015 Vietnam U19 Football Championship.

=== Công An Nhân Dân ===
In 2015, Thành Chung was one of the 16 players from the Hanoi T&T Youth Football Training Center managed by coach Phạm Minh Đức, playing for the Công An Nhân Dân in the V.League 2. He wore the number 18 shirt and scored a header to help his team achieve their first victory in the First Division.

=== Hà Nội ===
In the 2016 V.League 1, Thành Chung made his debut for Hanoi T&T alongside several other young players like Phạm Đức Huy, Đỗ Hùng Dũng, and Nguyễn Quang Hải. After the first two seasons, he had played 32 out of 52 matches for the capital city team.

On 1 October 2022, Thành Chung marked his 100th appearance in V.League 1 with a 5–1 victory over Becamex Binh Duong.

On 9 March 2025, Thành Chung renewed his contract with Hanoi FC until 2030.

== International career ==
=== Vietnam U-19 ===
In 2015, Thành Chung was a member of the Vietnam national under-19 football team. He wore the number 3 jersey during his time with the U-19 squad.

=== Vietnam U-23 ===
In December 2017, Thành Chung was called up for the first time by coach Park Hang-seo to join the Vietnam national under-23 football team. He wore the number 15 jersey in his debut match for the U-23 team in a friendly against South Korean club Ulsan Hyundai.

In January 2018, Thành Chung was one of 25 players selected for Vietnam’s U-23 squad at the 2018 AFC U-23 Championship in China. He played in only two matches during the tournament, as Vietnam reached the final.

In December 2019, Nguyễn Thành Chung and the Vietnam U-22 team won the gold medal in men's football at the 30th SEA Games. During the group-stage match against U-22 Indonesia, Thành Chung scored a crucial header in the 63rd minute to equalize at 1-1. Vietnam eventually won the match 2-1.

== Career statistics ==
=== Club ===
As of match played 7 November 2026

Appearances and goals by club, season and competition
Club	Division	League			National cup		Continental		Other		Total	
Club	Division	Season	Apps	Goals	Apps	Goals	Apps	Goals	Apps	Goals	Apps	Goals
Hà Nội	V.League 1	2016	19	0	7	0	2 (Note: Appearance(s) in AFC Champions League)	0	1 (Note: Appearance in Vietnamese Super Cup)	0	29	0
Hà Nội	V.League 1	2017	13	1	1	0	3 (Note: One appearance in AFC Champions League and two appearances in AFC Cup)	0	1	0	18	1
Hà Nội	V.League 1	2018	10	1	4	1	—		—		14	2
Hà Nội	V.League 1	2019	17	4	4	0	14 (Note: Two appearances in AFC Champions League, twelve appearances and one goal in AFC Cup)	1	1	0	36	5
Hà Nội	V.League 1	2020	16	1	4	3	—		1	0	21	4
Hà Nội	V.League 1	2021	8	0	0	0	—		1	0	9	0
Hà Nội	V.League 1	2022	22	1	3	0	—		—		25	1
Hà Nội	V.League 1	2023	16	0	0	0	—		1	0	17	0
Hà Nội	V.League 1	2023–24	21	0	4	0	5	0	—		30	0
Hà Nội	V.League 1	2024–25	19	0	0	0	—		—		19	0
Hà Nội	V.League 1	2025–26	21	0	1	0	—		—		22	0
Hà Nội	V.League 1	2026–27	7	0	0	0	—		—		7	0
Total career			189	8	28	4	24	1	6	0	247	13

=== International ===
As of match played 7 August 2026

Appearances and goals by national team and year
National team	Year	Apps	Goals
Vietnam
Vietnam	2018	1	0
Vietnam	2021	10	0
Vietnam	2022	7	0
Vietnam	2023	4	0
Vietnam	2024	8	0
Vietnam	2025	5	0
Vietnam	2026	5	0
Total		40	0

== International goals ==
=== U-23 ===
Scores and results list Vietnam's goal tally first. Only results against national teams were counted

#	Date	Venue	Opponent	Score	Result	Competition
1	22 March 2019	Mỹ Đình National Stadium, Hanoi, Vietnam	Brunei	2–0	6–0	2020 AFC U-23 Championship qualification
2	26 March 2019	Mỹ Đình National Stadium, Hanoi, Vietnam	Thailand	3–0	4–0	2020 AFC U-23 Championship qualification
3	1 December 2019	Rizal Memorial Stadium, Manila, Philippines	Indonesia	1–1	2–1	2019 Southeast Asian Games

== Honours ==
Hà Nội

- V.League 1: 2016, 2018, 2019, 2022
- Vietnamese National Cup: 2019, 2020, 2022
- Vietnamese Super Cup: 2019, 2020, 2021

Vietnam U23

- AFC U-23 Asian Cup runners-up: 2018
- SEA Games gold medal: 2019

Vietnam

- ASEAN Championship: 2024, 2026; runners-up: 2022
- VFF Cup: 2022

Individual

- V.League 1 Team of the Season: 2022, 2024–25
