= Phạm Văn Thuần =

Vietnamese footballer

Personal information
- Full name: Phạm Văn Thuần
- Date of birth: 1 September 1992 (age 34)
- Place of birth: Hải Hậu, Nam Định, Vietnam
- Height: 1.74 m (5 ft 9 in)
- Position: Midfielder

Youth career
- 2009–2013: Hà Nội

Senior career*
Years	Team	Apps	(Gls)
2013–2016	Hà Nội	54	(19)
2016–2018	Sài Gòn	31	(11)
2018	Nam Định	1	(0)
2018–2019	Becamex Bình Dương	17	(0)
2020–2021	Bình Định	11	(0)
2022–2023	Phú Thọ	2	(0)
- * Club domestic league appearances and goals as of 29 March 2018

Phạm Văn Thuần (born 1 November 1992) is a Vietnamese footballer who plays as a midfielder for V.League 2 club Phú Thọ.

== Honours ==
=== Club ===
Hà Nội

- V.League 1: 2013; runners-up: 2014
- Vietnamese Super Cup runners-up: 2013

Sài Gòn

- V.League 2: 2015

Nam Định

- V.League 2: 2017
