= 2022 Vietnamese Football League Third Division =

Vietnamese Football League Third Division
- Season: 2022
- Dates: 6 October – 31 October
- Promoted: Dugong Kien Giang; Luxury Ha Long

The 2022 Vietnamese Football League Third Division (Vietnamese: Giải Bóng đá hạng Ba quốc gia 2022) was the 23rd season of the Vietnamese Football League Third Division.

== Regular season ==
=== Group A (Vietnam Youth Football Training Center) ===
==== Table ====
Pos	Team	Pld	W	D	L	GF	GA	GD	Pts	Qualification or relegation
1	Vi Tri Vang Kon Tum (Q)	5	3	2	0	13	4	+9	11	Qualification to Final stage
2	Luxury Ha Long (Q)	5	3	1	1	7	4	+3	10	Qualification to Final stage
3	Song Lam Nghe An B	5	2	2	1	10	4	+6	8	
4	Hanoi B	5	2	2	1	7	5	+2	8	
5	Phu Yen	5	1	0	4	5	14	−9	3	
6	Cong An Nhan Dan B	5	0	1	4	3	14	−11	1	

Source: VFF
Rules for classification: 1) Points; 2) Goal difference; 3) Goals scored
(Q) Qualified for the phase indicated

==== Results ====
Home \ Away	CN2	HN2	LHL	PYN	SN2	VKT
Cong An Nhan Dan B		2–2				0–4
Hanoi B				1–0	2–0	
Luxury Ha Long	2–0	2–1				0–3
Phu Yen	3–0		0–3			2–4
Song Lam Nghe An B	3–1		0–0	6–0		
Vi Tri Vang Kon Tum		1–1			1–1	

Source: VFF
Legend: Blue = home team win; Yellow = draw; Red = away team win.

=== Group B (Thanh Long Sports Center) ===
==== Table ====
Pos	Team	Pld	W	D	L	GF	GA	GD	Pts	Qualification or relegation
1	Nutifood (Q)	7	5	2	0	22	6	+16	17	Qualification to Final stage
2	Dugong Kien Giang (Q)	7	5	2	0	14	3	+11	17	Qualification to Final stage
3	An Giang	7	5	0	2	17	6	+11	15	
4	Cung Dinh Thap	7	4	0	3	17	9	+8	12	
5	Tay Ninh	7	3	0	4	12	9	+3	9	
6	Long An B	7	2	1	4	12	16	−4	7	
7	Ben Tre	7	1	0	6	6	32	−26	3	
8	Can Tho B	7	0	1	6	6	25	−19	1	

Source: VFF
Rules for classification: 1) Points; 2) Goal difference; 3) Goals scored
(Q) Qualified for the phase indicated

==== Results ====
Home \ Away	AGG	BEN	CT2	CDT	DKG	LA2	NFD	TNH
An Giang			6–0	1–0	0–1		2–3	
Ben Tre	1–4					1–5	0–10	0–2
Can Tho B		0–2				1–4	0–3	
Cung Dinh Thap		5–2	2–1		0–1			
Dugong Kien Giang		6–0	3–3				0–0	
Long An B	0–2			1–7	0–1			0–2
Nutifood				2–1		2–2		2–1
Tay Ninh	1–2		5–1	1–2	0–2			

Source: VFF
Legend: Blue = home team win; Yellow = draw; Red = away team win.

== Final stage ==
31 October 2022
15:00

Vi Tri Vang Kon Tum	0–1	Dugong Kien Giang
	Report	Nguyen Dang Hau 47'

Nha Trang Stadium, Nha Trang
31 October 2022
18:00

Nutifood	0–0	Luxury Ha Long
	Report
Penalties
Penalty scored Penalty missed	3-4	Penalty scored

Nha Trang Stadium, Nha Trang

Dugong Kien Giang and Luxury Ha Long are promoted to the Second Division.
