= Nguyễn Anh Tiệp =

Vietnamese footballer

Personal information
- Full name: Nguyễn Anh Tiệp
- Date of birth: 2 February 2006 (age 20)
- Place of birth: Nghệ An, Vietnam
- Height: 1.83 m (6 ft 0 in)
- Position: Center-back

Team information
- Current team: Hà Nội
- Number: 33

Youth career
- VSH Academy
- –2025: Hà Nội

Senior career*
| Years | Team | Apps | (Gls) |
| 2023–2025 | Hà Nội B | | |
| 2026– | Hà Nội | 13 | (2) |

International career^{‡}
| 2023 | Vietnam U17 | 1 | (0) |
| 2026– | Vietnam U23 | 2 | (0) |
- * Club domestic league appearances and goals as of 21 November 2026 ‡ National team caps and goals as of 14 November 2026

Nguyễn Anh Tiệp (born 2 February 2006) is a Vietnamese professional footballer who plays as a center-back for V.League 1 club Hà Nội.

== Early career ==
Born in Nghệ An, Anh Tiệp began his career at the VSH Academy. He then got recruited to the Hà Nội youth academy. At youth level, Anh Tiệp was a versatile player, being able to operate as a center-back, a midfielder and a forward.

== Club career ==
In March 2026, Anh Tiệp was promoted to Hà Nội's first team by head coach Harry Kewell. He made his professional debut on 12 April 2026, coming in as a substitute in the 3–0 V.League 1 win over Hồng Lĩnh Hà Tĩnh. A week after, he scored his first goal for the team, contributing in Hà Nội's 3–2 victory against Ninh Bình. He continued to score in the following week with a goal against SHB Đà Nẵng.

== International career ==
Anh Tiệp was named in Vietnam U17's preliminary squad for the 2023 AFC U-17 Asian Cup but did not make it into the final list.

== Honours ==
Vietnam U23

- Gia Lai U-23 VTV Cup: 2026
