= Vũ Văn Sơn =

Vietnamese footballer

Personal information
- Full name: Vũ Văn Sơn
- Date of birth: 10 May 2003 (age 23)
- Place of birth: Quỳnh Lưu, Nghệ An, Vietnam
- Height: 1.81 m (5 ft 11 in)
- Position: Centre back

Team information
- Current team: SHB Đà Nẵng (on loan from Hà Nội)
- Number: 56

Youth career
- –2022: Hà Nội

Senior career*
Years	Team	Apps	(Gls)
2023–	Hà Nội	1	(0)
2023–2024	→ Quảng Nam (loan)	1	(0)
2024	→ Hòa Bình (loan)	8	(0)
2024–2025	→ Hồ Chí Minh City Youth (loan)	14	(0)
2025–	→ SHB Đà Nẵng (loan)	15	(2)

International career^{‡}
2022–2023	Vietnam U20	14	(0)
Medal record
Men's football
Representing Vietnam
AFF U-19 Youth Championship
Third place	Indonesia 2022	Team
- * Club domestic league appearances and goals as of 7 June 2026 ‡ National team caps and goals as of 1 April 2023

Vũ Văn Sơn (born 10 May 2003) is a Vietnamese professional footballer who plays as a centre back for V.League 1 club SHB Đà Nẵng, on loan from Hà Nội.

== Club career ==
Văn Sơn was a member of the Hà Nội FC youth academy. In April 2022, Văn Sơn solid performances in the defense and leadership lead the under 19 team of Hà Nội FC win the Vietnamese National U-19 Championship. He was also named as the "Player of the tournament". In the end of the year, he started for the U21 team of Hà Nội and won the Vietnamese National U-21 Championship. Following his several achievements with Hà Nội youth teams, Văn Sơn was promoted to the first team of Hà Nội by coach Božidar Bandović for the 2023 V.League 1 season. He made his professional debut on 31 May 2023 in Hà Nội's 0–1 league defeat against Hoàng Anh Gia Lai.

In September 2023, it was announced that Văn Sơn will be loaned to Quảng Nam for the 2023–24 V.League 1 season. He made only one appearance for the club before his loan was terminated.

In March 2024, Văn Sơn joined V.League 2 side Hòa Bình on loan.

In September 2024, Văn Sơn was loaned to Phù Đổng Ninh Bình, but the club later switch their entire squad with Hồ Chí Minh City Youth, resulting in Văn Sơn's move to the club.

In August 2025, Văn Sơn was loaned to V.League 1 side SHB Đà Nẵng.

== International career ==
Văn Sơn was a member of the Vietnam U19 squad in the 2022 AFF U-19 Youth Championship. He appeared in six matches as Vietnam finished the tournament in the third place. Originally named as the captain of Vietnam under-20s for the 2023 AFC U-20 Championship, Văn Sơn was ruled out of the final 23-men squad for the tournament due to an injury.

== Honours ==
Vietnam U19

- AFF U-19 Youth Championship: Third place: 2022
- International U-19 Thanh Niên Newspaper Cup: 2022
