= Chu Ngọc Nguyễn Lực =

Vietnamese footballer

Personal information
- Full name: Chu Ngọc Nguyễn Lực
- Date of birth: 28 July 2009 (age 17)
- Place of birth: Thanh Chương, Nghệ An, Vietnam
- Height: 1.74 m (5 ft 9 in)
- Position: Attacking midfielder

Team information
- Current team: Hà Nội
- Number: 24

Youth career
- 2019–2022: VST Academy
- 2022–: Hà Nội

Senior career*
Years	Team	Apps	(Gls)
2026–	Hà Nội	1	(0)

International career^{‡}
2024–	Vietnam U17	30	(13)
- * Club domestic league appearances and goals as of 12 September 2026 ‡ National team caps and goals as of 20 November 2026

Chu Ngọc Nguyễn Lực (born 28 July 2009) is a Vietnamese footballer who plays for V.League 1 club Hà Nội.

== Early career ==
Born in Nghệ An, at the age of 9, Nguyễn Lực participated in an admission trial to his local Sông Lam Nghệ An team, but was rejected by the team due to his young age. He then began his career at the VST Academy, owned by former footballer Văn Sỹ Thủy. After three years at the team, he was recruited by the Hà Nội youth academy, the partner team of VST. With Hà Nội, he helped the team won the National U-17 Championship in 2024 and 2025, and won the Best player award in the 2025 edition.

== Club career ==
In September 2026, Hà Nội's head coach promoted Nguyễn Lực to the first team and registered him for the 2026–27 V.League 1. On 12 September 2026, he made his professional debut in Hà Nội's 1–4 league defeat against Sông Lam Nghệ An, coming in as a substitute for Nguyễn Hai Long in the 83rd minute.

== International career ==
Nguyễn Lực featured in the 2025 AFC U-17 Asian Cup with Vietnam U17 being one of the youngest member of the squad. A year later, he led Vietnam U-17 to win the 2026 ASEAN U-17 Boys' Championship and was named Best player of the tournament.

In the 2026 AFC U-17 Asian Cup, Nguyễn Lực played an important role to help the team advance to thr quarter-finals, thus qualified Vietnam to the 2026 FIFA U-17 World Cup.

== Career statistics ==
=== Club ===
As of match played 12 September 2026

Appearances and goals by club, season and competition
Club	Season	League			Cup		Others		Total	
Club	Season	Division	Apps	Goals	Apps	Goals	Apps	Goals	Apps	Goals
Hà Nội	2026–27	V.League 1	1	0	0	0	—		1	0
Career total			1	0	0	0	0	0	1	0

=== International goals ===
==== Vietnam U17 ====
No.	Date	Venue	Opponent	Score	Result	Competition
1	22 June 2024	Sriwedari Stadium, Surakarta, Indonesia	Brunei	15–0	15–0	2024 ASEAN U-16 Boys Championship
2	1 June 2025	Hohhot City Stadium, Hohhot, China	Saudi Arabia	2–1	2–1	2025 CFA Team China U-16 Cup
3	3 November 2025	PVF Stadium, Hưng Yên, Vietnam	Cambodia	1–0	5–0	Friendly
4	5 November 2025	PVF Stadium, Hưng Yên, Vietnam	Cambodia	5–0	5–0	Friendly
5	22 November 2025	PVF Stadium, Hưng Yên, Vietnam	Singapore	4–0	6–0	2026 AFC U-17 Asian Cup qualification
6	24 November 2025	PVF Stadium, Hưng Yên, Vietnam	Northern Mariana Islands	5–0	14–0	2026 AFC U-17 Asian Cup qualification
7	16 April 2026	Gelora Joko Samudro Stadium, Gresik, Indonesia	Timor-Leste	1–0	10–0	2026 ASEAN U-17 Boys' Championship
8	16 April 2026	Gelora Joko Samudro Stadium, Gresik, Indonesia	Timor-Leste	4–0	10–0	2026 ASEAN U-17 Boys' Championship
9	16 April 2026	Gelora Joko Samudro Stadium, Gresik, Indonesia	Timor-Leste	10–0	10–0	2026 ASEAN U-17 Boys' Championship
10	22 April 2026	Gelora Joko Samudro Stadium, Gresik, Indonesia	Australia	2–1	2–1	2026 ASEAN U-17 Boys' Championship
11	13 May 2026	King Abdullah Sports City Hall Stadium, Jeddah, Saudi Arabia	United Arab Emirates	2–1	3–2	2026 AFC U-17 Asian Cup
12	14 November 2026	Saoud bin Abdulrahman Stadium, Al Wakrah, Qatar	Panama	1–1	1–1	Friendly
13	20 November 2026	Aspire Zone (Pitch 9), Al Rayyan, Qatar	Belgium	2–3	2–3	2026 FIFA U-17 World Cup

== Honours ==
Vietnam U17

- ASEAN U-17 Boys' Championship: 2026

Individual

- Vietnamese National U-17 Football Championship Best player: 2025
- ASEAN U-17 Boys' Championship best player: 2026
