= Nguyễn Đức Anh =

Vietnamese footballer

Personal information
- Full name: Nguyễn Đức Anh
- Date of birth: 16 May 2003 (age 23)
- Place of birth: Mỹ Đức, Hanoi, Vietnam
- Height: 1.75 m (5 ft 9 in)
- Positions: Centre back; left-back

Team information
- Current team: Hà Nội
- Number: 29

Youth career
- 2019–2022: Hà Nội

Senior career*
| Years | Team | Apps | (Gls) |
| 2022 | Hà Nội B | | |
| 2023– | Hà Nội | 11 | (0) |
| 2025–2026 | → SHB Đà Nẵng (loan) | 34 | (1) |

International career^{‡}
| 2022–2023 | Vietnam U20 | 11 | (2) |
| 2023–2026 | Vietnam U23 | 17 | (0) |
| 2026– | Vietnam | 1 | (0) |
Medal record
Men's football
Representing Vietnam
AFC U-23 Asian Cup
| Third place | Saudi Arabia 2026 |
ASEAN U-23 Championship
| Winner | Indonesia 2025 |
- * Club domestic league appearances and goals as of 21 November 2026 ‡ National team caps and goals as of 17 November 2026

Nguyễn Đức Anh (born 16 May 2003) is a Vietnamese professional footballer who plays as a centre back or left-back for V.League 1 club Hà Nội and the Vietnam national team.

== Club career ==
=== Early career ===
Born in Hanoi, Đức Anh joined the youth local team of Hà Nội. In 2019, Đức Anh caused controversy after hitting in the face of Chinese player Zheng Haokun during a youth tournament in Guangzhou. He later apologized for his unsportsmanlike behavior and was banned from the rest of the tournament.

=== Hà Nội ===
In 2023, Đức Anh was promoted to the Hanoi FC's senior team by coach Božidar Bandović. On 4 June 2023, he made his first-team debut in a 1–0 win against Thep Xanh Nam Dinh.

=== Loan to SHB Đà Nẵng ===
On 20 December 2024, due to lack of game time at Hà Nội, Đức Anh moved to SHB Đà Nẵng on a half season loan deal.

== International career ==
In 2023, Đức Anh was included in the Vietnam under-20 squad for the 2023 AFC U-20 Championship and started in all three group matches as his team were eliminated.

In November 2026, Đức Anh received his first call-up to the Vietnam national team, being named in the squad for the friendly tournament Casper Cup.

== Career statistics ==
As of match played 21 November 2026

Appearances and goals by club, season and competition
| Club | Season | League | | | National cup | | Continental | | Other | | Total | |
| Club | Season | Division | Apps | Goals | Apps | Goals | Apps | Goals | Apps | Goals | Apps | Goals |
|---|---|---|---|---|---|---|---|---|---|---|---|---|
| Hà Nội | 2023 | V.League 1 | 6 | 0 | 1 | 0 | — | | 0 | 0 | 7 | 0 |
| Hà Nội | 2023–24 | V.League 1 | 2 | 0 | 2 | 0 | 1 (Note: Appearance(s) in AFC Champions League) | 0 | — | | 5 | 0 |
| Hà Nội | 2024–25 | V.League 1 | 0 | 0 | 0 | 0 | — | | — | | 0 | 0 |
| Hà Nội | 2026–27 | V.League 1 | 3 | 0 | 0 | 0 | — | | — | | 3 | 0 |
| Hà Nội | Total | | 11 | 0 | 3 | 0 | 1 | 0 | 0 | 0 | 15 | 0 |
| SHB Đà Nẵng | 2024–25 | V.League 1 | 16 | 0 | 1 | 0 | — | | — | | 17 | 0 |
| SHB Đà Nẵng | 2025–26 | V.League 1 | 18 | 1 | 2 | 0 | — | | — | | 20 | 1 |
| SHB Đà Nẵng | Total | | 34 | 1 | 3 | 0 | 0 | 0 | 0 | 0 | 37 | 1 |
| Total career | | | 45 | 1 | 6 | 0 | 1 | 0 | 0 | 0 | 52 | 1 |

== Honours ==
Vietnam U23

- ASEAN U-23 Championship: 2025
- SEA Games gold medal: 2025
- AFC U-23 Asian Cup third place: 2026

Vietnam U19

- International Thanh Niên Newspaper Cup: 2022
