= Lê Văn Hà =

Vietnamese footballer (born 2004)

Personal information
- Full name: Lê Văn Hà
- Date of birth: 1 July 2004 (age 22)
- Place of birth: Đà Nẵng, Vietnam
- Height: 1.84 m (6 ft 0 in)
- Position: Centre-back

Team information
- Current team: Hà Nội
- Number: 3

Youth career
- 2020–2023: Hà Nội

Senior career*
Years	Team	Apps	(Gls)
2023	Hà Nội B	5	(1)
2023–	Hà Nội	4	(0)
2023	→ SHB Đà Nẵng (loan)	0	(0)
2023–2024	→ Hòa Bình (loan)	19	(0)
2026	→ Bắc Ninh (loan)	12	(0)

International career^{‡}
2023–2024	Vietnam U20	3	(0)
2024–2026	Vietnam U23	14	(0)
Medal record
Men's football
Representing Vietnam
AFC U-23 Asian Cup
Third place	Saudi Arabia 2026
ASEAN U-23 Championship
Winner	Indonesia 2025
- * Club domestic league appearances and goals as of 7 June 2026 ‡ National team caps and goals as of 25 September 2026

Lê Văn Hà (born 1 July 2004) is a Vietnamese professional footballer who plays as a center-back for V.League 1 club Hà Nội.

== Club career ==
Born in Đà Nẵng, Văn Hà was a youth product of Hà Nội FC.

In June 2023, he joined his hometown team SHB Đà Nẵng on a half season loan deal but didn't make any appearance.

In October 2024, Văn Hà was loaned to V.League 2 club Hòa Bình until the end of the 2023–24 season. On 31 October 2023, he made his professional debut, starting in his team's 2–2 draw against SHB Đà Nẵng.

== International career ==
In 2023, Văn Hà was named in Vietnam U20's squad for the 2023 AFC U-20 Asian Cup and appeared in two games, both as a substitute as Vietnam failed to advance to the next stage. Later that year, he named in Vietnam U23's preliminary squad for the 2023 AFF U-23 Championship but was not included in the final squad.

== Career statistics ==
As of match played 28 April 2024

Appearances and goals by club, season and competition
Club	Season	League			Cup		Asia		Other		Total	
Club	Season	Division	Apps	Goals	Apps	Goals	Apps	Goals	Apps	Goals	Apps	Goals
SHB Đà Nẵng (loan)	2023	V.League 1	0	0	0	0	—		—		0	0
Hòa Bình	2023–24	V.League 2	19	0	1	0	—		—		20	0
Total career			19	0	1	0	0	0	0	0	20	0

== Honours ==
Vietnam U23

- ASEAN U-23 Championship: 2025
- AFC U-23 Asian Cup third place: 2026
