= Thân Thành Tín =

Vietnamese footballer

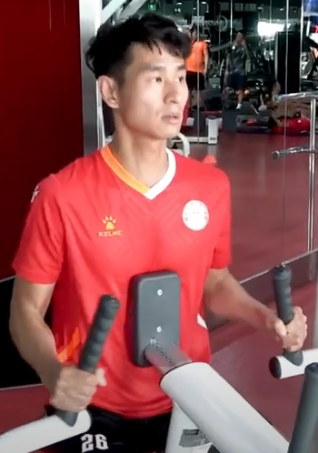
- Thành Tín in 2022

Personal information
- Full name: Thân Thành Tín
- Date of birth: May 30, 1993 (age 33)
- Place of birth: Thanh Trì, Hanoi, Vietnam
- Height: 1.73 m (5 ft 8 in)
- Position: Centre-back

Team information
- Current team: LPBank Hồ Chí Minh City
- Number: 26

Youth career
- 2006–2014: Hà Nội

Senior career*
Years	Team	Apps	(Gls)
2013–2014	→ Công An Nhân Dân (loan)		
2015–2020	Sài Gòn	120	(4)
2020–2023	Hồ Chí Minh City	17	(0)
2024	LPBank Hồ Chí Minh City		

International career
2015–2016	Vietnam U21	4	(0)
- * Club domestic league appearances and goals

Thân Thành Tín (born 30 May 1993) is a Vietnamese professional footballer who is playing as a center-back for LPBank Hồ Chí Minh City.
