= Đinh Thế Nam =

Vietnamese footballer and manager (born 1965)

Personal information
- Full name: Đinh Thế Nam
- Date of birth: April 30, 1965 (age 61)
- Place of birth: Haiphong, North Vietnam
- Position: Midfielder

Senior career*
Years	Team	Apps	(Gls)
- Air Force
- Thể Công
- Haiphong Police

International career
1985–1995	Vietnam		

Managerial career
- 2004–2005: Mitsustar Haiphong
- 2009: Vicem Cement Haiphong (caretaker)
- 2009–2010: Vicem Cement Haiphong (assistant)
- 2010–2011: Hà Nội T&T Youth
- 2012–2015: Viettel Youth
- 2015–2016: Vietnam U16
- 2016–2022: PVF Football Academy
- 2022: Vietnam U23 (caretaker)
- 2022: Vietnam U19
- 2023–: Hà Nội Youth (academy director)
- 2023–2024: Hà Nội (caretaker)
Medal record
Men's football
Representing Vietnam
AFF U-23 Championship
Winner	Cambodia 2022	Team
- * Club domestic league appearances and goals

Đinh Thế Nam (born 30 April 1965) is a Vietnamese football manager and former footballer who currently is the head director of the Hanoi FC youth academy.

== Early life ==
He is a native of Haiphong, Vietnam.

== Career ==
He mainly operated as a midfielder and has been described as "plays skillfully, intelligently and is considered a "passing machine" for the strikers above". He had been a regular member of the Vietnam national team between 1985 and 1995.

In January 2022, he was named as the caretaker manager of the Vietnam U23 team. He helped the team win the 2022 AFF U-23 Championship.

== Personal life ==
He has been nicknamed "Nam 'chợ'".

== Honours ==
=== Player ===
Thể Công

- V.League: 1990

Haiphong Police

- Vietnamese Cup: 1995

=== Manager ===
Vietnam U23

- AFF U-23 Championship: 2022
