= Vũ Đình Hai =

Vietnamese footballer (born 2000)

Personal information
- Full name: Vũ Đình Hai
- Date of birth: 13 January 2000 (age 26)
- Place of birth: Thanh Hóa, Vietnam
- Height: 1.72 m (5 ft 8 in)
- Positions: Left-back; winger

Team information
- Current team: Hà Nội
- Number: 21

Youth career
- 2015–2018: Hà Nội

Senior career*
Years	Team	Apps	(Gls)
2018–	Hà Nội	50	(2)
2018–2019	→ Hồng Lĩnh Hà Tĩnh (loan)	1	(0)
2020	→ Phú Thọ (loan)		
2021–2022	→ Phù Đổng (loan)	26	(1)
2023	→ Hòa Bình (loan)	15	(2)

International career^{‡}
2022	Vietnam U23	2	(0)
Medal record
Men's football
Representing Vietnam
AFF U-23 Championship
Winner	Cambodia 2022	Team
- * Club domestic league appearances and goals as of 7 June 2026 ‡ National team caps and goals as of 20 April 2023

Vũ Đình Hai (born 13 January 2000) is a Vietnamese professional footballer who plays as a left-back or winger for V.League 1 club Hà Nội.

== Club career ==
Born in Thanh Hóa, Đình Hai was a youth product of the Hà Nội youth academy. He began his senior career playing for Hồng Lĩnh Hà Tĩnh on loan, where he made only one appearance. He was then loaned to Phù Đổng, where he spent two seasons.

In 2023, Đình Hai signed for V.League 2 side Hòa Bình on a loan. He was a regular starter for the club and scored two goals in the 2023 season.

Đình Hai returned to Hà Nội in the 2023–24 season, making his debut in the V.League 1. At the club, he was repositioned to play as a left-back. On 4 April 2024, he scored his first goal for Hà Nội in the club's 3–1 league victory against Hồ Chí Minh City.

On 2 February 2025, he signed a new contract until the end of the 2026–27 season.

== International career ==
In 2022, Đình Hai featured in Vietnam U23's winning team in the 2022 AFF U-23 Championship, appearing in the last group stage game and the semi-final.

== Honours ==
Vietnam U23

- AFF U-23 Championship: 2022
