= Phạm Minh Đức =

Vietnamese footballer and coach

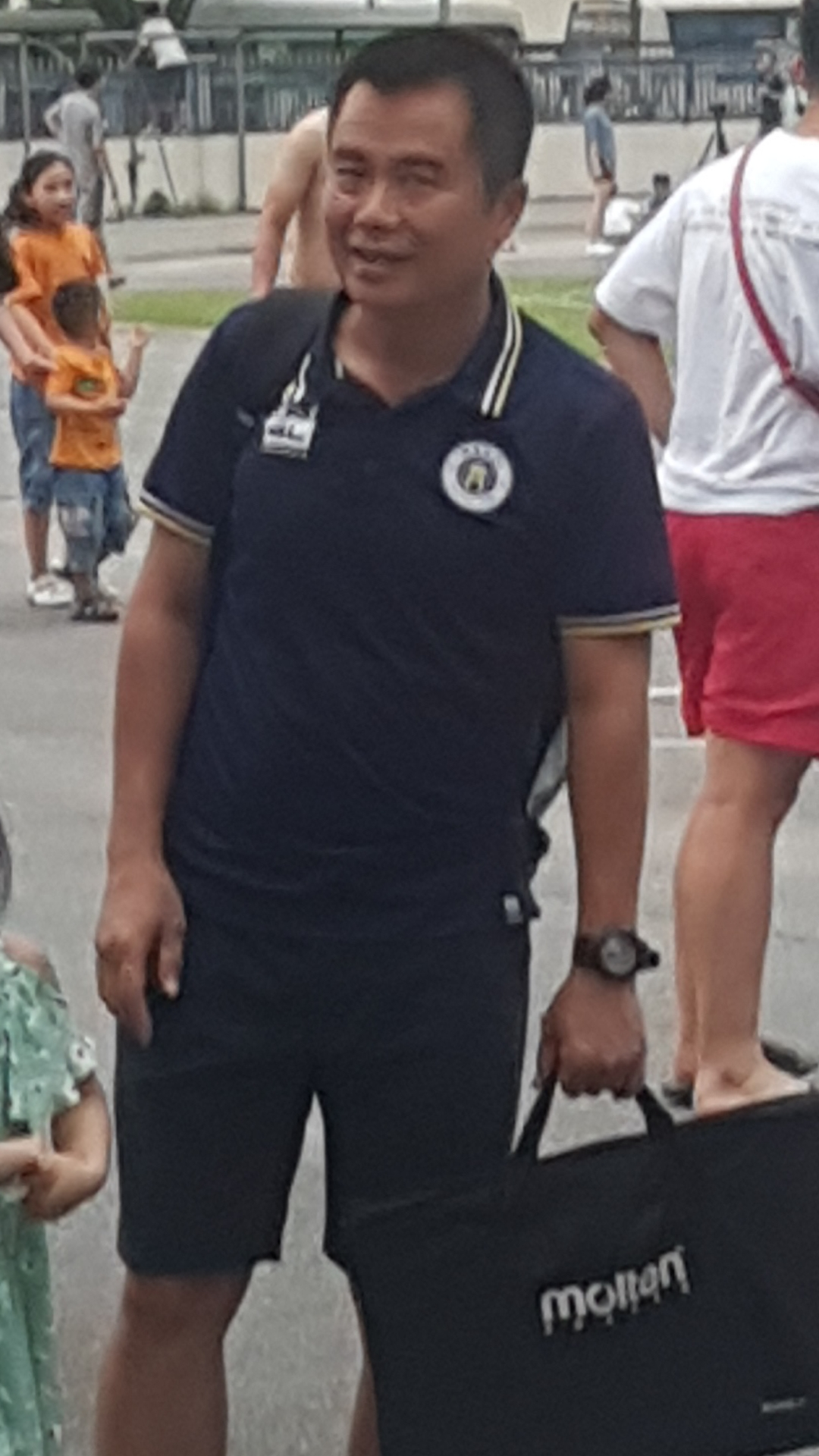
- Minh Đức in 2024

Personal information
- Full name: Phạm Minh Đức
- Date of birth: 5 May 1976 (age 50)
- Place of birth: Hà Đông, Hanoi, Vietnam
- Height: 1.65 m (5 ft 5 in)
- Position: Defender

Youth career
- 1992–2001: Công An Hà Nội

Senior career*
Years	Team	Apps	(Gls)
2002–2003	Hàng Không Việt Nam	15	(1)
2003–2005	Hoàng Anh Gia Lai	35	(10)
2005–2007	Quảng Nam	35	(5)
2007	Thể Công	23	(10)
2007–2010	Bình Dương	14	(0)
2010	Hà Nội T&T	20	(7)
2011	Hòa Phát Hà Nội	15	(0)
2012–2013	Becamex Bình Dương	35	(3)

International career
2002–2008	Vietnam	2	(0)

Managerial career
- 2016: Hà Nội
- 2016–2019: Hà Nội B
- 2019–2021: Hồng Lĩnh Hà Tĩnh
- 2023: SHB Đà Nẵng
- 2024–2026: Hà Nội B
- 2026–: Thái Nguyên
- * Club domestic league appearances and goals

Phạm Minh Đức (born 5 May 1976) is a Vietnamese football manager, pundit and former player who is the head coach of Thái Nguyên.

As a player, Phạm Minh Đức played as a defender. He represented Vietnam at the 2002 AFF Championship.

== Managerial career ==
On 2 June 2023, Minh Duc replaced Phan Thanh Hung as SHB Da Nang stood 14th in the table.
