= Mạch Ngọc Hà =

Vietnamese footballer (born 2000)

Personal information
- Birth name: Mạch Ngọc Hà
- Date of birth: 7 October 2000 (age 26)
- Place of birth: Thanh Hóa, Vietnam
- Height: 1.70 m (5 ft 7 in)
- Position: Winger

Team information
- Current team: Công An Nhân Dân
- Number: 10

Youth career
- –2011: Tuyên Quang
- 2011–2018: Hà Nội

Senior career*
Years	Team	Apps	(Gls)
2018	Hà Nội B	0	(0)
2019–2024	Hà Nội	3	(0)
2021–2022	→ Phù Đổng (loan)	6	(1)
2022	→ Quảng Nam (loan)	21	(5)
2023–2024	→ Quảng Nam (loan)	20	(0)
2024–2026	Ninh Bình	23	(4)
2026	→ Công An Hồ Chí Minh City (loan)	9	(0)
2026–	Công An Nhân Dân	1	(0)
- * Club domestic league appearances and goals as of 11 September 2026

Mạch Ngọc Hà (born 07 October 2000) is a Vietnamese professional footballer who plays as a winger for V.League 2 club Công An Nhân Dân.

== Club career ==
A graduate from the Hà Nội FC youth academy, Ngọc Hà was part of the Hà Nội B team that finished as runners-up in the 2018 V.League 2. After getting promoted to the first team in 2019, Ngọc Hà was loaned to Phù Đổng in 2021, and then to Quảng Nam in 2022.

After his successful loan spells, Ngọc Hà had his first appearances with Hà Nội FC in the 2022 Vietnamese Super Cup game as the team won 2–0 against Hải Phòng to win the title. On 5 February 2023, Ngọc Hà made his V.League 1 debut for Hà Nội against Viettel in a 1–1 draw.

In August 2026, Ngọc Hà was transferred to V.League 2 club Công An Nhân Dân.

== Career statistics ==
As of match played 23 January 2025

Club	Season	League			Cup		Asia		Other		Total	
Club	Season	Division	Apps	Goals	Apps	Goals	Apps	Goals	Apps	Goals	Apps	Goals
Hà Nội B	2018	V.League 2	0	0	—		—		0	0	0	0
Hà Nội	2019	V.League 1	0	0	1	0	0	0	0	0	1	0
Hà Nội	2020	V.League 1	0	0	1	0	0	0	0	0	1	0
Hà Nội	2023	V.League 1	3	0	0	0	—		1 (Note: Appearance in Vietnamese Super Cup)	0	4	0
Hà Nội	Total		3	0	2	0	0	0	1	0	6	0
Phù Đổng (loan)	2021	V.League 2	6	1	1	1	—		—		7	2
Quảng Nam (loan)	2022	V.League 2	21	5	2	0	—		—		23	5
Quảng Nam (loan)	2023–24	V.League 1	20	0	2	0	—		—		22	0
Phù Đổng Ninh Bình	2024–25	V.League 2	5	3	1	0	—		—		6	3
Total career			55	9	8	1	0	0	1	0	64	10

== Honours ==
Hà Nội

- Vietnamese National Cup: 2019, 2020
- Vietnamese Super Cup: 2022

Phù Đổng Ninh Bình

- V.League 2: 2024–25

Công An Hồ Chí Minh City

- Vietnamese National Cup: 2025–26
