= Phạm Đức Huy =

Vietnamese footballer

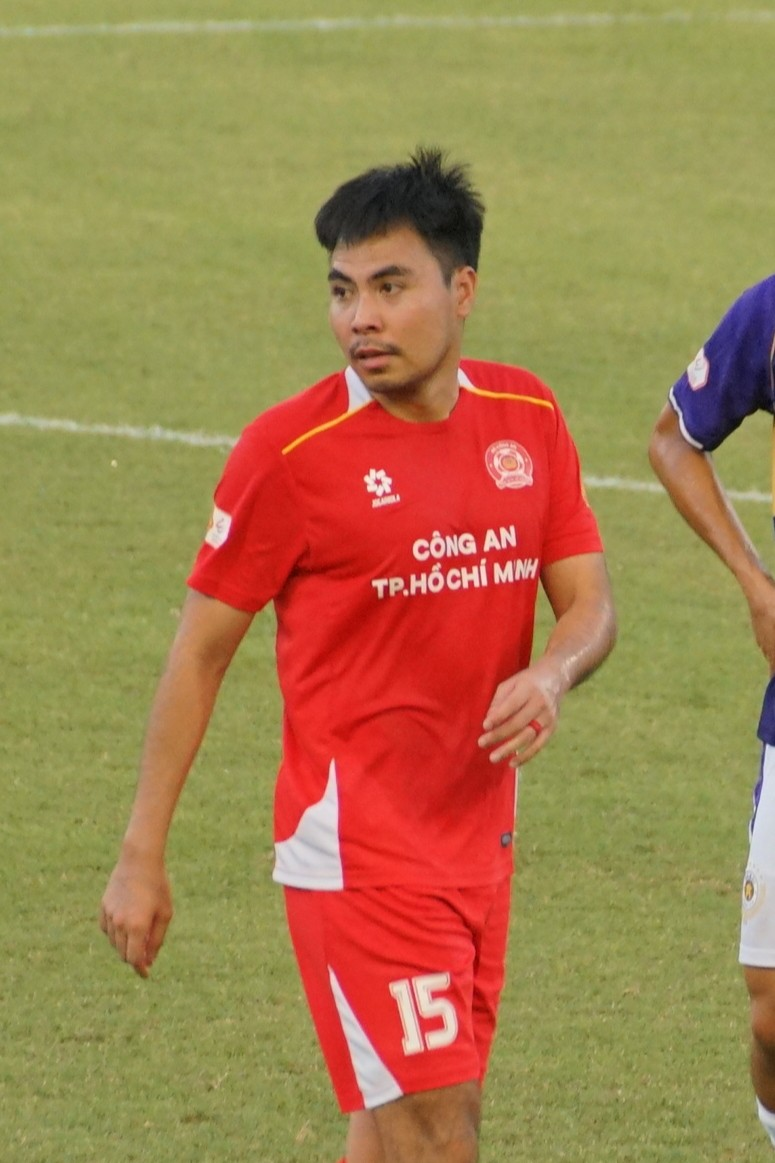
- Đức Huy in 2026

Personal information
- Full name: Phạm Đức Huy
- Date of birth: 20 January 1995 (age 31)
- Place of birth: Thanh Miện, Hải Dương, Vietnam
- Height: 1.73 m (5 ft 8 in)
- Position: Defensive midfielder

Team information
- Current team: Hà Nội
- Number: 15

Youth career
- 2007–2015: Hà Nội T&T

Senior career*
Years	Team	Apps	(Gls)
2016–2022	Hà Nội	106	(1)
2015–2016	→ Hà Nội (2011) (loan)	1	(0)
2023–2024	Thép Xanh Nam Định	30	(0)
2025	Quy Nhơn Bình Định	14	(0)
2025–2026	Công An Hồ Chí Minh City	17	(0)
2026–	Hà Nội	0	(0)

International career^{‡}
2013–2014	Vietnam U19	12	(1)
2016–2017	Vietnam U22	2	(0)
2015–2018	Vietnam U23	22	(1)
2018–2021	Vietnam	15	(2)
Medal record
Men's football
Representing Vietnam
SEA Games
Bronze medal – third place	Singapore 2015	Team
AFC U-23 Championship
Runner-up	China 2018
AFF Championship
Winner	ASEAN 2018
- * Club domestic league appearances and goals as of 7 June 2026 ‡ National team caps and goals as of 13 October 2021

Phạm Đức Huy (born 20 January 1995) is a Vietnamese professional footballer who plays as a defensive midfielder for V.League 1 club Hà Nội. Nicknamed "Prince of Arabia" due to his similar outlook like an Arab prince.

== Club career ==
=== Youth ===
Pham Duc Huy was born in Thanh Miên district, Hải Dương province. He is the youngest son in the family. At the age of 10, Đức Huy was selected to train at the Hải Dương Sports Center, at the same time as Nguyễn Văn Toàn and Vũ Văn Thanh.

In 2006, he joined Hanoi T&T youth academy at the age of 11. In 2013, Đức Huy and his teammate Đỗ Duy Mạnh had 1-month training in Japan with J2 League club Consadole Sapporo.

Đức Huy was named in the Team of the tournament of the 2015 National U-21 Championship. His team U-21 Hanoi also won this tournament.

=== Senior ===
In 2015, Đức Huy was loaned to V.League 2 club Hà Nội (2011). The club then won a promotion to V.League 1 in the same year.

After the loan end, he was immediately promoted to the first team of Hanoi T&T to compete in V.League 1 in the 2016 season.

In the 2017, he played for Hanoi T&T in the 2017 AFC Cup. In a match against Felda United, he scored a goal from over 30 meters, this goal was later voted into one of the best goals of the tournament.

In August 2025, Đức Huy joined V.League 1 club Công An Hồ Chí Minh City as a free agent.

== International career ==
=== Youth levels ===
Duc Huy was selected by coach Guillaume Graechen to the Vietnam U-19 team to compete in the 2014 U-19 Asian qualification and the 2013 U-19 SEA Games. Under coach Toshiya Miura, he was called up to the Vietnam U-23 team to compete in the 28th SEA Games and the 2016 U-23 AFC. At the end of 2017, he was named in the Vietnam U-23 squad to win the Silver medal in 2018 U-23 AFC.

=== National team ===
At the 2018 AFF Championship, Duc Huy scored against Malaysia to make his first goal for the senior national team. After two matches, Vietnam then won the championship.

== Career statistics ==
=== U-19 ===
#	Date	Venue	Opponent	Score	Result	Competition
1	14 September 2013	Petrokimia Stadium, Gresik Regency, Indonesia	Indonesia	1–1	2-1	2013 AFF U-19 Youth Championship

=== U-23 ===
#	Date	Venue	Opponent	Score	Result	Competition
1	29 May 2015	Bishan Stadium, Singapore	Brunei	4–0	6-0	2015 Southeast Asian Games

=== Vietnam ===
Scores and results list Vietnam's goal tally first.

No.	Date	Venue	Opponent	Score	Result	Competition
1.	11 December 2018	Bukit Jalil National Stadium, Kuala Lumpur, Malaysia	Malaysia	2–0	2–2	2018 AFF Championship
2.	8 June 2019	Chang Arena, Buriram, Thailand	Curaçao	1–1	1–1 (4–5 p)	2019 King's Cup

== Honours ==
Hà Nội (2011)

- V.League 2: 2015

Hà Nội

- V.League 1: 2016, 2018, 2019, 2022
- Vietnamese National Cup: 2019, 2020, 2022
- Vietnamese Super Cup: 2019, 2020, 2021

Thép Xanh Nam Định

- V.League 1: 2023–24
- Vietnamese Super Cup: 2024

Công An Hồ Chí Minh City

- Vietnamese National Cup: 2025–26

Vietnam U23

- AFC U-23 Championship Runners-up 2018
- VFF Cup: 2018

Vietnam

- AFF Championship: 2018
- King's Cup: Runner-up 2019
