= Nguyễn Văn Hoàng =

Vietnamese footballer

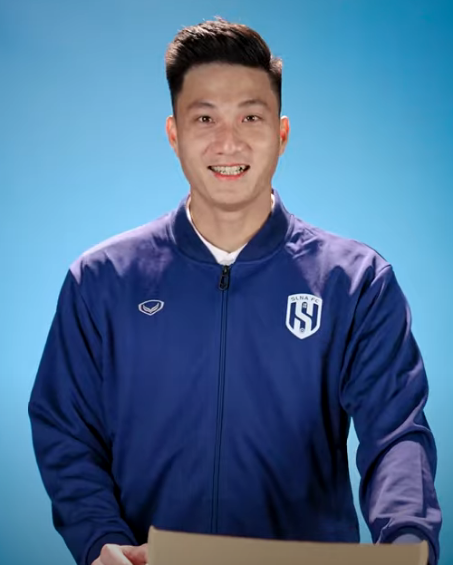
- Văn Hoàng in 2022

Personal information
- Full name: Nguyễn Văn Hoàng
- Date of birth: 17 February 1995 (age 31)
- Place of birth: Tân Kỳ, Nghệ An, Vietnam
- Height: 1.87 m (6 ft 2 in)
- Position: Goalkeeper

Team information
- Current team: Hà Nội
- Number: 5

Youth career
- 2008–2015: Hà Nội

Senior career*
Years	Team	Apps	(Gls)
2015–2019	Sài Gòn	24	(0)
2019–2023	Sông Lam Nghệ An	49	(0)
2023–	Hà Nội	31	(0)

International career^{‡}
2017–2018	Vietnam U23	1	(0)
Medal record
Vietnam under-23
AFC U-23 Championship
Runner-up	China 2018
- * Club domestic league appearances and goals as of 7 June 2026 ‡ National team caps and goals as of 1 June 2021

Nguyễn Văn Hoàng (born 17 February 1995) is a Vietnamese footballer who plays as a goalkeeper for V.League 1 club Hà Nội.

== Club career ==
=== Hanoi FC ===
On 28 August 2023, Văn Hoàng signed a five-year contract with Hanoi FC. As goalkeeper, he dons the unusual number 5 shirt for Hà Nội, previously worn by the likes of Ubaldo Fillol and Luca Bucci.

Nguyen Van Hoang made his debut for Hanoi in the AFC Champions League against Urawa Red Diamonds on 6 December 2023. In the fifth minute of the match, he saved a penalty from Alexander Scholz. In the next home match, a 2–0 victory against Song Lam Nghe An, Van Hoang kept his first clean sheet for Hanoi.

== Career statistics ==
As of match played 14 September 2024

Appearances and goals by club, season and competition
Club	Season	League			Cup		Asia		Other		Total	
Club	Season	Division	Apps	Goals	Apps	Goals	Apps	Goals	Apps	Goals	Apps	Goals
Saigon FC	2016	V.League 1	8	0	0	0	—		—		8	0
Saigon FC	2017	V.League 1	3	0	1	0	—		—		4	0
Saigon FC	2018	V.League 1	1	0	0	0	—		—		1	0
Saigon FC	2019	V.League 1	12	0	0	0	—		—		12	0
Saigon FC	Total		24	0	1	0	0	0	0	0	25	0
Song Lam Nghe An	2020	V.League 1	15	0	1	0	—		—		16	0
Song Lam Nghe An	2021	V.League 1	12	0	0	0	—		—		12	0
Song Lam Nghe An	2022	V.League 1	18	0	0	0	—		—		18	0
Song Lam Nghe An	2023	V.League 1	4	0	1	0	—		—		5	0
Song Lam Nghe An	Total		49	0	2	0	0	0	0	0	51	0
Hanoi FC	2023–24	V.League 1	11	0	3	0	1 (Note: Appearances in AFC Champions League)	0	—		5	0
Hanoi FC	2024–25	V.League 1	1	0	0	0	0	0	—		1	0
Hanoi FC	Total		12	0	3	0	1	0	0	0	16	0
Total career			85	0	6	0	1	0	0	0	92	0

== Honours ==
Vietnam U23

- AFC U-23 Championship runner-up: 2018
