= Đậu Văn Toàn =

Vietnamese footballer (born 1997)

Personal information
- Full name: Đậu Văn Toàn
- Date of birth: 7 April 1997 (age 29)
- Place of birth: Hanoi, Vietnam
- Height: 1.70 m (5 ft 7 in)
- Position: Defensive midfielder

Team information
- Current team: Hà Nội
- Number: 8

Youth career
- 2009–2018: Hà Nội

Senior career*
Years	Team	Apps	(Gls)
2018–	Hà Nội	123	(1)
- * Club domestic league appearances and goals as of 7 June 2026

Đậu Văn Toàn (born 7 April 1997) is a Vietnamese professional footballer who plays as a defensive midfielder for V.League 1 club Hà Nội.

== Honours ==
Hà Nội

- V.League 1: 2018, 2019, 2022; runner-up: 2020
- Vietnamese National Cup: 2019, 2020, 2022
- Vietnamese Super Cup: 2019, 2020, 2021
