= Đỗ Duy Mạnh =

Vietnamese footballer (born 1996)

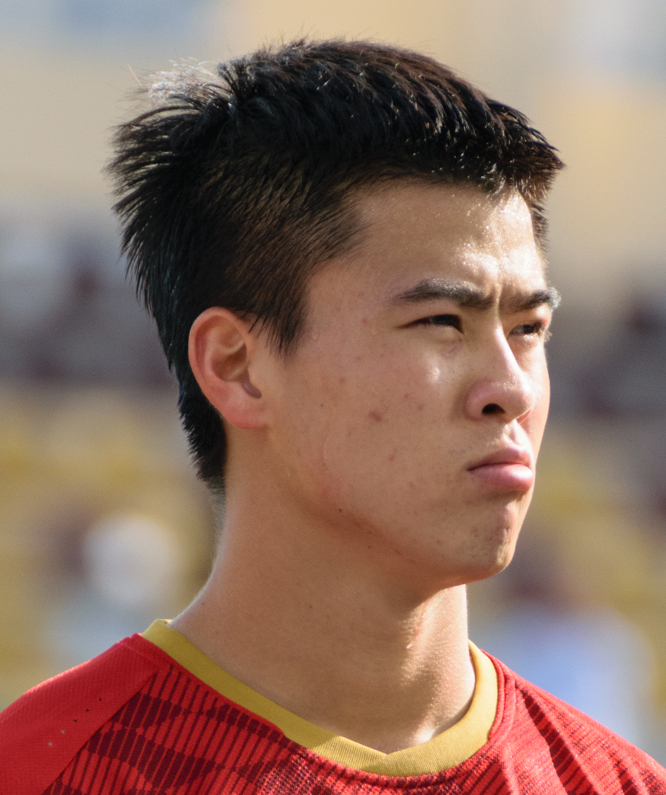
- Duy Mạnh with Vietnam at the 2019 AFC Asian Cup

Personal information
- Full name: Đỗ Duy Mạnh
- Date of birth: 29 September 1996 (age 30)
- Place of birth: Đông Anh, Hanoi, Vietnam
- Height: 1.80 m (5 ft 11 in)
- Position: Centre-back

Team information
- Current team: Hà Nội
- Number: 2

Youth career
- 2006–2013: Hanoi Football Training Center
- 2013–2015: Hà Nội

Senior career*
Years	Team	Apps	(Gls)
2015–	Hà Nội	194	(8)

International career^{‡}
2012–2013	Vietnam U16	15	(4)
2013–2014	Vietnam U19	18	(5)
2015–2016	Vietnam U20	23	(6)
2015–2019	Vietnam U23	32	(4)
2015–	Vietnam	73	(2)
Medal record
Men's football
Representing Vietnam
SEA Games
Bronze medal – third place	Singapore 2015	Team
AFC U-23 Championship
Runner-up	China 2018
ASEAN Championship
Winner	ASEAN 2018	Team
Runner-up	ASEAN 2022	Team
Winner	ASEAN 2024	Team
- * Club domestic league appearances and goals as of 7 June 2026 ‡ National team caps and goals as of 31 March 2026

Đỗ Duy Mạnh (born 29 September 1996) is a Vietnamese professional footballer who plays as a centre-back for V.League 1 club Hà Nội and captains the Vietnam national team.

Duy Mạnh was promoted to Hà Nội FC first team in 2015 season and instantly became an important part of the team, he won 2015 V.League 1 best young player award at the end of the season. Duy Mạnh has represented Vietnam at various youth levels and was he called up to senior team in 2015 at the age of 19.

Duy Mạnh is a former Vietnam youth international, representing his country at under-16, under-19 and under-23 levels. He made his senior international debut in 2015, being chosen in Vietnam's squads for the 2019 and 2023 AFC Asian Cup.

== Early life ==
Born on 29 September 1996 in Đông Anh District, Hanoi, Duy Mạnh started playing football around the age of eight. In 2006, at the age of ten, he started training at Hanoi Football Training Center and then transferred to youth team of Hà Nội T&T later on in 2013. On December of the same year, Duy Mạnh along with his teammate Phạm Đức Huy had a trial with J2 League club Consadole Sapporo.

== Club career ==
Duy Mạnh was promoted to Hà Nội T&T first team from 2015 season. On 4 January 2015, he made his debut for the club in V.League 1 at the first-round game against Đồng Tâm Long An, came in as a substitute and scored the equaliser at the 71st minute. He since then became a regular for the starting eleven. On September, Duy Mạnh won the 2015 V.League 1 young player of the season award.

== International career ==
=== Youth ===
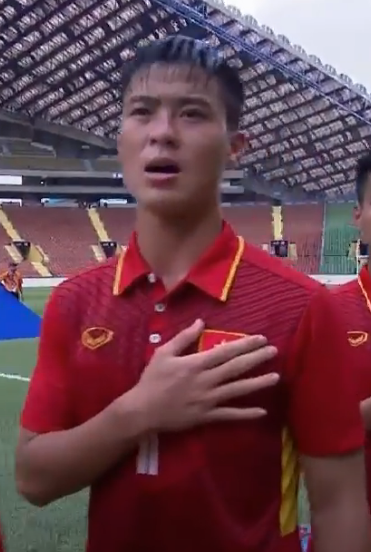
Duy Mạnh with Vietnam U22 at the 2017 SEA Games

Duy Mạnh was a member of Vietnam U16 squad for 2011 AFF U-16 Youth Championship in Laos. He scored four goals in the tournament, including a hat-trick against Philippines U16.

Throughout 2013 to 2014, Duy Mạnh was frequently called up to under-19 team. He putted on a solid performance when replacing injured captain Lương Xuân Trường at 2014 AFC U-19 Championship qualification, but he was dropped from the squad later on in the final tournament.

In March 2015, Duy Mạnh was called up to Vietnam U23 for 2016 AFC U-23 Championship qualification but his injury kept him out until the last group game against Macau. He was a regular for Vietnam at SEA Games 2015 that won the bronze medal.

=== Senior ===
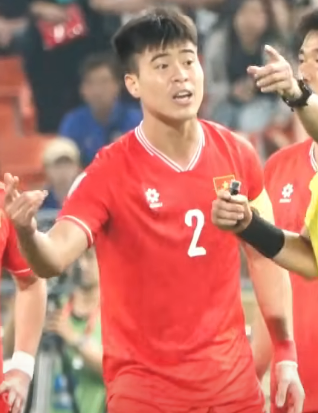
Duy Mạnh with Vietnam national football team at the 2024 ASEAN Championship

On 8 March 2015, Duy Mạnh made his debut for the senior Vietnam team at 2018 FIFA World Cup qualification (AFC) game against Iraq. He played the whole game and his performance was praised by the media.

== Career statistics ==
=== Club ===
As of match played 7 June 2026

Appearances and goals by club, season and competition
Club	Season	League			National cup		Continental		Other		Total	
Club	Season	Division	Apps	Goals	Apps	Goals	Apps	Goals	Apps	Goals	Apps	Goals
Hanoi FC	2015	V.League 1	22	2	3	0	1 (Note: Appearance(s) in AFC Champions League)	0	—		26	2
Hanoi FC	2016	V.League 1	8	0	3	0	2	0	1 (Note: Appearance in Vietnamese Super Cup)	0	14	0
Hanoi FC	2017	V.League 1	17	0	1	0	6 (Note: One appearance in AFC Champions League and five appearances in AFC Cup)	0	1	0	25	0
Hanoi FC	2018	V.League 1	24	2	5	0	—		—		29	2
Hanoi FC	2019	V.League 1	21	0	4	0	15 (Note: Two appearances in AFC Champions League, thirteenth appearances and one goal in AFC Cup)	1	0	0	36	1
Hanoi FC	2020	V.League 1	0	0	0	0	—		1	0	1	0
Hanoi FC	2021	V.League 1	10	1	0	0	—		0	0	10	1
Hanoi FC	2022	V.League 1	18	0	3	1	—		—		21	1
Hanoi FC	2023	V.League 1	17	2	1	0	—		1	0	19	2
Hanoi FC	2023–24	V.League 1	20	0	3	0	5	0	—		28	0
Hanoi FC	2024–25	V.League 1	17	1	0	0	—		—		17	1
Hanoi FC	2025–26	V.League 1	20	0	1	0	—		—		21	0
Total career			194	8	24	1	29	1	4	0	247	10

=== International ===
As of match played 31 March 2026

Appearances and goals by national team and year
National team	Year	Apps	Goals
Vietnam	2015	2	0
Vietnam	2016	2	0
Vietnam	2017	3	0
Vietnam	2018	9	0
Vietnam	2019	11	1
Vietnam	2021	13	0
Vietnam	2022	4	0
Vietnam	2023	11	0
Vietnam	2024	8	0
Vietnam	2025	8	0
Vietnam	2026	2	1
Total		73	2

Vietnam score listed first, score column indicates score after each Mạnh goal

List of international goals scored by Đỗ Duy Mạnh
No.	Date	Venue	Opponent	Score	Result	Competition
1	15 October 2019	Kapten I Wayan Dipta Stadium, Gianyar, Indonesia	Indonesia	1–0	3–1	2022 FIFA World Cup qualification
2	31 March 2026	Thiên Trường Stadium, Ninh Bình, Vietnam	Malaysia	1–0	3–1	2027 AFC Asian Cup qualification

== Honours ==
Hà Nội

- V.League 1: 2016, 2018, 2019, 2022
- Vietnamese National Cup: 2019, 2020, 2022; runner-up: 2015, 2016
- Vietnamese Super Cup: 2019, 2020, 2021; runner-up: 2016, 2017

Vietnam U23/Olympic

- SEA Games bronze medal: 2015
- AFC U-23 Championship runner-up: 2018
- Asian Games fourth place: 2018
- VFF Cup: 2018

Vietnam

- ASEAN Championship: 2018, 2024; runner-up: 2022
- VFF Cup: 2022
- King's Cup runner-up: 2019

ASEAN All-Stars

- Maybank Challenge Cup: 2025

Individual

- V.League 1 Young Player of the Season: 2015

Orders

- Third-class Labor Order: 2025
