= Vũ Tiến Long =

Vietnamese footballer

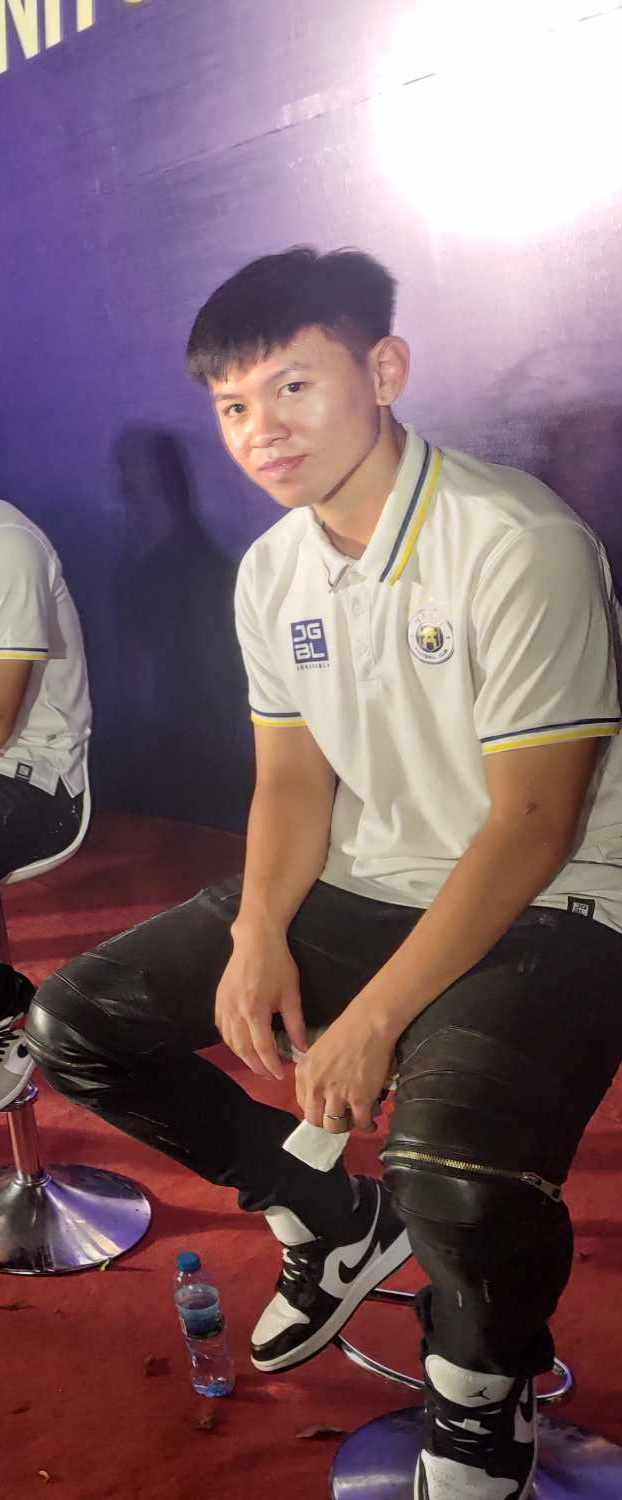

Personal information
- Full name: Vũ Tiến Long
- Date of birth: 4 April 2002 (age 24)
- Place of birth: Sầm Sơn, Thanh Hóa, Vietnam
- Height: 1.75 m (5 ft 9 in)
- Positions: Center back; right-back

Team information
- Current team: Bắc Ninh (on loan from Hà Nội)
- Number: 86

Youth career
- 2012–2015: Viettel
- 2015–2022: Hà Nội

Senior career*
Years	Team	Apps	(Gls)
2021	→ Phù Đổng (loan)	5	(0)
2022–	Hà Nội	20	(0)
2022	→ Công An Nhân Dân (loan)	11	(1)
2024–2025	→ Quảng Nam (loan)	13	(0)
2026–	→ Bắc Ninh (loan)	1	(0)

International career^{‡}
2017–2018	Vietnam U16	14	(0)
2019–2021	Vietnam U19	9	(0)
2022–2023	Vietnam U23	15	(2)
Medal record
Men's football
Representing Vietnam
AFF U-17 Youth Championship
Winner	Thailand 2017
AFF U-23 Championship
Winner	Cambodia 2022
SEA Games
Gold medal – first place	Hanoi 2021	Team
Bronze medal – third place	Phnom Penh 2023	Team
- * Club domestic league appearances and goals as of 19 September 2026 ‡ National team caps and goals as of 7 May 2022

Vũ Tiến Long (born 4 April 2002) is a Vietnamese professional footballer who plays for V.League 1 club Bắc Ninh, on loan from Hà Nội.

== International goals ==
=== Vietnam U23 ===
No.	Date	Venue	Opponent	Score	Result	Competition
1	19 February 2022	Phnom Penh, Cambodia	Singapore	7–0	7–0	2022 AFF U-23 Championship
2	5 June 2022	Tashkent, Uzbekistan	South Korea	1–1	1–1	2022 AFC U-23 Asian Cup

== Honours ==
Công An Nhân Dân

- V.League 2: 2022

Vietnam U16

- AFF U-15 Youth Championship: 2017
- JENESYS Japan-ASEAN U-16 Youth Football Tournament runner-up: 2017

Vietnam U23

- AFF U-23 Championship: 2022
- SEA Games gold medal: 2021; bronze medal: 2023
