= Hanoi FC =

Vietnamese football club

Hà Nội
- Full name: Hanoi Football Club; Câu lạc bộ bóng đá Hà Nội
- Nickname: Đội bóng áo tím (The Purple)
- Short name: HNFC
- Founded: 18 June 2006; 20 years ago
- Ground: Hàng Đẫy Stadium
- Capacity: 22,000
- Owner(s): T&T Sports JSC
- Chairman: Đỗ Vinh Quang
- Head coach: Harry Kewell
- League: V.League 1
- 2025–26: V.League 1, 4th of 14
- Website: hanoifc.com.vn
Home colours	Away colours	Third colours

Hanoi Football Club (Vietnamese: Câu lạc bộ bóng đá Hà Nội), is a professional football club based in Hanoi, Vietnam. They play their home matches at Hàng Đẫy Stadium and compete in V.League 1, the top division in the Vietnamese football league system. The club was founded in 2006 as T&T Hanoi Football Club, later renamed Hanoi T&T Football Club in 2010, before adopting its current name in 2016.

Domestically, Hanoi FC have won a record 6 V.League 1 titles, 3 Vietnamese Cups, and a record 5 Vietnamese Super Cups. In international football, the club has participated in seven editions of Asian competitions to date, most notably reaching the AFC Cup inter-zone play-off final in 2019.

== History ==
=== Foundation and rise ===
Hanoi FC was formed in 2006 as T&T Hanoi Football Club (Vietnamese: Câu lạc bộ bóng đá T&T Hà Nội) by T&T Group. The team initially played in the lowest division of Vietnamese football, the Third Division. In its first three years, under the management of former Vietnamese international Triệu Quang Hà, the team achieved consecutive promotions. They finished in 1st place in Third Division in 2006, 2nd place in Second Division in 2007, and 2nd place in First Division in 2008. These results secured the club's promotion to the 2009 V.League, Vietnam's top-tier football league.

=== Establishment of a new powerhouse (2009–2015) ===
Once the club established its foothold, Hà Nội T&T began to rapidly emerge as a strong contender and experienced success in its debut season in the top league. Although the club missed out on winning the 2009 season, they found joy the following year by clinching their first-ever league title in the 2010 season.

==== AFC Cup debut (2011) ====
In the 2011 AFC Cup, Hà Nội T&T made their debut in continental competition after winning the 2010 league title. Drawn in Group G alongside Thailand club Muangthong United, Singaporean club Tampines Rovers and Maldives club Victory SC, the club began its campaign with a 4–0 defeat to Muangthong United. Hà Nội T&T subsequently recorded a 2–0 home victory over Victory SC and drew 1–1 with Tampines Rovers. Despite later defeats to Tampines Rovers and a goalless draw against Muangthong United, the team concluded the group stage with a 1–0 away win over Victory SC. Hà Nội T&T finished third in the group with two wins, two draws and two defeats, accumulating eight points and failing to qualify for the knockout stage.

In the 2012 V-League season, Hà Nội T&T finished as runners-up. Their final league match against Xuân Thành Sài Gòn attracted controversy, with allegations that Hanoi T&T had played defensively to benefit SHB Đà Nẵng, another club owned by the same individual. Xuân Thành Sài Gòn's owner subsequently announced the club's dissolution.

Hà Nội T&T returned to the top of the league in the 2013 season, securing the 2013 V.League 1 league title with one round remaining after defeating Đồng Tâm Long An with 2–1 scoreline. Argentinian Gonzalo Marronkle and Hoàng Vũ Samson scored 28 goals combined and shared the league's top-scorer award for that season.

Hà Nội T&T finished as runners-up in the 2014 V.League 1, behind champions Becamex Bình Dương. The club remained in contention for the title during the season, but ultimately missed out on first place. Their league campaign included a 6–4 victory over Than Quảng Ninh on 22 June 2012 and a 5–2 win against Thanh Hóa on the final matchday on 10 August 2014. Striker Hoàng Vũ Samson scored 23 goals to finish as the league's top scorer. Despite their strong attacking performances, Hà Nội T&T finished second in the standings and qualified for the following season's AFC Cup. Hà Nội T&T competed in the 2014 AFC Cup after being eliminated in the qualifying rounds of the 2014 AFC Champions League. The club was drawn in Group F alongside Indonesian club Arema, Malaysian club Selangor and the Maldivian club Maziya. Hà Nội T&T won five of their six group matches, including victories over Maziya, Arema and Selangor, to finish top of the group with 15 points. They scored 14 goals and advanced to the knockout stage as group winners. In the round of 16, Hà Nội T&T defeated Myanmar club Nay Pyi Taw 5–0 at home on 14 May, with Hoàng Vũ Samson scoring twice alongside goals from Hughton Hector, Thạch Bảo Khanh and Phạm Thành Lương. The victory sent the Vietnamese side into the quarter-finals, where they faced Iraqi club Erbil. Hà Nội T&T lost the first leg 1–0 at home on 19 August and were beaten 2–0 in the return leg on 26 August, resulting in a 3–0 aggregate defeat. Their campaign therefore ended in the quarter-finals, matching their progress to that stage of the competition.

=== Domestic dominance (2016–2022) ===
The 2016 season, which marked the 10th anniversary of the capital club, saw significant changes for Hà Nội T&T, including two coaching changes. The first occurred just a week before the season when coach Phan Thanh Hưng resigned. He was replaced by Phạm Minh Đức, the coach of the Hà Nội T&T U21 team at the time. However, Phạm Minh Đức's tenure began poorly, with the team earning only 1 point from the first 4 matches and sitting at the bottom of the table. On 17 March 2016, the team decided to replace Phạm Minh Đức with assistant coach Chu Đình Nghiêm. This change led to a remarkable improvement in gameplay and results, allowing the team to rise steadily up the table with only 2 rounds remaining. In the penultimate round, needing a win to keep their championship hopes alive, Hà Nội T&T secured all 3 points with a 1–0 victory over Than Quảng Ninh, thanks to a goal from Nguyễn Văn Quyết. This result gave the club the control over their own destiny in the final match. A 2–0 victory over Thanh Hóa, featuring a brace from Gonzalo Marronkle, allowed Hà Nội T&T to win the V-League championship for the third time, finishing just above Hai Phong on goal difference. However, in the 2016 Vietnamese Cup, the team finished as runners-up after a narrow 1–2 lost to Than Quảng Ninh.

At the end of 2016, shortly after winning the V-League title, T&T Group decided to dedicate the club to the people of Hanoi, withdrawing its stake and officially renaming the club Hanoi Football Club. The City Council also decided to grant Hàng Đẫy Stadium to the club as a tribute, allowing the team to use and improve the facilities.

The 2017 V.League 1 season ended disappointingly for Hà Nội , as they finished third despite remaining in contention for the title until the final round. After defeating Quảng Nam 1–0 in the penultimate round, the club drew 4–4 with Than Quảng Ninh in their final match, allowing Quảng Nam to secure the league title. In the 2017 Vietnamese Cup, Hà Nội were eliminated in the round of 16 by Sông Lam Nghệ An. In the 2017 AFC Cup, Hà Nội were drawn in Group G alongside Philippines club Ceres–Negros, Singaporean club Tampines Rovers and Malaysian club Felda United. They opened their campaign with a 1–1 draw against Ceres–Negros before drawing 1–1 with Felda United. Hà Nội subsequently recorded consecutive victories over Tampines Rovers, winning 4–0 at home and 2–1 away, before defeating Felda United 4–1. These results left the club in contention for qualification ahead of their final group match against Ceres–Negros. However, Hà Nội suffered a 6–2 defeat away to Ceres–Negros on 19 April. The match saw the Vietnamese side struggle defensively, while striker Hoàng Vũ Samson was sent off after the interval. Hà Nội finished the group stage with three wins, two draws and one defeat, collecting 11 points from six matches. Although they finished level on points with Ceres–Negros, they were placed second on the head-to-head tiebreaker and failed to advance to the ASEAN zonal semi-finals.

In the 2018 season, the success of the Vietnam U23 team in the 2018 AFC U-23 Championship, where Hà Nội players played a crucial role, significantly boosted interest in the club. The team began with a hard-fought 1–0 victory over Haiphong at Hang Day Stadium and then won 5–0 against Hoang Anh Gia Lai in a match that reached the stadium's audience limit of 25,000. Hà Nội secured the championship with 64 points and 72 goals scored, clinching the title with 5 rounds to spare. However, the season ended on a disappointing note when the team missed the opportunity to reach the 2018 Vietnamese Cup final after a goalless draw against Becamex Binh Duong at Gò Đậu Stadium. With an aggregate score of 3–3, Hà Nội was eliminated due to the away goals rule.

==== Back to back league champions and domestic double (2019) ====
In 2019, Hà Nội began their continental campaign in the qualifying rounds of the AFC Champions League, defeating Thailand club Bangkok United 1–0 before losing 4–1 to China club Shandong Luneng in the play-off round. The club subsequently entered the 2019 AFC Cup, where they topped Group F with 13 points from six matches. They recorded victories over Cambodian club Nagaworld and Singaporean club Tampines Rovers, alongside a win and a defeat against Myanmar club Yangon United, to advance to the knockout stage. In the ASEAN zonal semi-finals, Hà Nội faced Philippines club Ceres–Negros, drawing 1–1 away before winning 2–1 at home to progress 3–2 on aggregate. They then defeated fellow Vietnamese club Becamex Bình Dương 1–0 in both legs of the ASEAN zonal final, securing a 2–0 aggregate victory and the ASEAN zonal title. In the inter-zone play-off semi-finals, Hà Nội faced Turkmenistan club Altyn Asyr, winning the first leg 3–2 before drawing 2–2 away in the second leg to advance 5–4 on aggregate. Their campaign ended in the inter-zone play-off final against North Korea club April 25 SC. After a 2–2 draw in the first leg in Hanoi, the second leg in Pyongyang ended goalless. The tie finished 2–2 on aggregate, with April 25 advancing to the final on the away-goals rule.

Domestically, Hà Nội won the 2019 V.League 1 title with two rounds remaining, finishing ahead of their challengers after a strong season. They also won the 2019 Vietnamese Cup, defeating Hồ Chí Minh City 3–0 in the semi-finals before beating Quảng Nam in the final. The cup victory completed the club's collection of major domestic trophies.

After more than five years as head coach, Chu Đình Nghiêm left Hà Nội by mutual agreement on 4 April 2021, following a difficult start to the 2021 V.League 1 season. During his tenure, he led the club to three V.League 1 titles in 2016, 2018 and 2019, two Vietnamese Cup titles in 2019 and 2020, and three Vietnamese Super Cup titles in 2018, 2019 and 2020. He was replaced on an interim basis by Hoàng Văn Phúc.

In 2022, under the management of Korean head coach Chun Jae-ho, Hà Nội won the 2022 V.League 1, marking their sixth title and tying them with The Cong-Viettel for the most V.League titles since the league began in 1980. They also won the 2022 Vietnamese Cup, which qualified them for the 2023–24 AFC Champions League group stage.

=== Recent seasons (2023–present) ===
In 2023, under Montenegrin head coach Božidar Bandović, Hà Nội began the season by winning the 2023 Vietnamese Super Cup, defeating Hải Phòng 2–0. In the 2023 V.League 1, the club finished as runners-up with 38 points, behind city rivals Công An Hà Nội. However, they were eliminated in the round of 16 of the 2023 Vietnamese Cup, losing 2–1 to Viettel.

==== AFC Champions League debut (2023–2024) ====
Having won the 2022 V.League 1 title, Hà Nội qualified directly for the group stage of the 2023–24 AFC Champions League, marking their debut in the competition's group stage. Drawn in Group J alongside South Korean club Pohang Steelers, Japanese club Urawa Red Diamonds and China club Wuhan Three Towns, the club played its home matches at Mỹ Đình National Stadium. Hà Nội began the campaign with a 4–2 defeat to Pohang Steelers before suffering a 6–0 lost away to Urawa Red Diamonds. Their third match ended in a 2–1 defeat to Wuhan Three Towns, during which both sides had a player sent off. Following three consecutive defeats, Božidar Bandović was dismissed in October 2023 and was replaced by assistant coach Lê Đức Tuấn. Hà Nội subsequently recorded their first group-stage victory by defeating Wuhan Three Towns 2–1 at home, with Phạm Tuấn Hải scoring both goals. They then lost 2–0 away to Pohang Steelers before concluding their campaign with a 2–1 victory over defending champions Urawa Red Diamonds on 6 December. The result eliminated Urawa Red Diamonds from the competition, as they were unable to qualify for the knockout stage. Hà Nội finished third in Group J with six points from six matches and did not advance to the next stage. In the domestic 2023–24 V.League 1 season, Hà Nội finished third with 43 points and reached the final of the 2023–24 Vietnamese Cup, where they drew 0–0 with Thanh Hóa before losing 9–8 in the penalty shoot-out.

In the 2024–25 V.League 1, Hà Nội finished second with 49 points from 26 matches, behind champions Thép Xanh Nam Định. The team remained among the leading sides throughout the season but was unable to overtake Nam Định in the title race. Their Vietnamese Cup campaign ended in the round of 16, where they drew 0–0 with second-tier side Đồng Tháp before losing 4–3 in the penalty shoot-out. Although Hà Nội remained competitive in domestic football, they ended the season without adding another major trophy to their honours.

Hà Nội began the 2025–26 V.League 1 season under Japanese head coach Makoto Teguramori. After a difficult start to the campaign, the club appointed former Australian international Harry Kewell as head coach on 4 October 2025. Kewell had previously managed clubs in Australia, Scotland and Japan, including Yokohama F. Marinos. Under his leadership in his first season, Hà Nội finished fourth in V.League 1 with 46 points from 26 matches. Their Vietnamese Cup campaign ended in the qualifying round, where they lost 1–0 to Viettel on 14 September 2025.

Hà Nội continued under Harry Kewell into the 2026–27 season as they sought to return to the top of Vietnamese domestic football. Their Vietnamese Cup campaign ended in the first round after a 2–1 defeat to SHB Đà Nẵng following extra time and a penalty shoot-out. On 8 June 2026, the club celebrated the twentieth anniversary of its establishment in 2006 at a ceremony in Hanoi. The event commemorated the club's rise from the third division to becoming one of Vietnam's leading football teams and included the presentation of the Second-Class Labour Order in recognition of its contributions to Vietnamese football.

== Team image ==
=== Crest and colours ===
Hà Nội introduced a special crest to commemorate the club's 20th anniversary in 2026.

=== Name history ===
- 2006–2009: T&T Hà Nội
- 2010–2016: Hà Nội T&T
- 2016–present: Hà Nội

=== Supporters ===
Hà Nội has a relatively small, if not low, number of supporters despite its prestigious achievements, partly due to past corruption in the V.League, which led many people to lose interest in attending matches. To improve its image, a group of fans established the first official fan base for the club, known as Contras Hanoi, in 2015. After facing early difficulties and conflicts with older fans, Contras Hanoi grew to over 2,000 followers on Facebook by 2018 and has continued to expand, working to gain official recognition with the club's support. Contras Hanoi released an official fan song, Ô lê! Ô lê ! Hà Nội!, in 2022. Today, the club's professionalism is also a notable factor in the growth of Hà Nội's fan base.

=== Hải Phòng ===
In terms of geographical factors, Hanoi and Hải Phòng are the two largest cities in northern Vietnam, and their rivalry extends beyond football. Both clubs are among the most successful in the North, making their confrontations known as the "Northern Derby."

Portland is another team that consistently poses challenges for Hà Nội, often playing in an unpleasant manner. The matches between the two teams are always intense on the field, reflecting the fierce rivalry among their fans. The peak of this rivalry was in the 2016 V.League season, when Hanoi won the championship, edging out Hải Phòng, which was a highly competitive team at that time.

Matches between the teams are often marked by flares, a specialty of Hải Phòng's supporters. In the 2017 season, Hải Phòng was disciplined for causing disturbances in their match against Hanoi during the 6th round of the V.League, resulting in a ban on fans attending away games. In the second leg of that season, a "rain" of flares and water bottles were thrown at My Dinh Stadium (due to Hang Day Stadium's renovation). The VFF Disciplinary Committee subsequently banned Hai Phong fans from away games at the end of the first leg.

In the 2018 season, Hải Phòng was fined a record amount of over 300 million VND by the VFF Disciplinary Committee for setting off flares. However, by the 6th round of the 2019 V.League, a significant number of flares were again burned. Mr. Tran Anh Tu, chairman of the board and General Director of VPF, remarked that the match between Hanoi and Hải Phòng had "the most firecrackers ever" he had witnessed. Mr. Vu Xuan Thanh, Head of the VFF Disciplinary Committee, noted that Hải Phòng fans had brought boxes of flares into the stadium.

Over more than a decade of confrontations in the V.League, Hải Phòng and Hà Nội have each scored 63 goals against each other. Striker Hoàng Vũ Samson of Hà Nội is the highest scorer in this fixture with 12 goals.

On the other hand, it is worth noting that matches between Hải Phòng and the other two Hanoian clubs (Công An Hà Nội and Thể Công - Viettel) do not experience the same crowd trouble. Demonstrating that Hải Phòng rivalry sits mostly with the purple side of Hanoi.

=== Công An Hà Nội ===
After being promoted to the 2023 V.League 1, Công An Nhân Dân changed its name to the current Công An Hà Nội, following its relocation to Hanoi. Công An Hà Nội also shares Hàng Đẫy Stadium with Hà Nội. Shortly after its rebranding, the team made several major signings, including Đoàn Văn Hậu from Hà Nội. Công An Hà Nội's rapid rise challenged Hà Nội's dominant status in the league, leading to a new rivalry between the two teams.

=== Hoang Anh Gia Lai ===
In the 21st century, Hoang Anh Gia Lai and Hà Nội are widely regarded as the most supported clubs in Vietnam, and their confrontations are dubbed the "Vietnamese Super Derby." From 2009 to the end of 2025, the two teams have met 39 times in all competitions, with Hà Nội leading with 19 wins, 8 draws, and 12 losses. However, the intense rivalry gained significant attention starting in 2018, when Vietnam U23, featuring many players from both clubs, finished as runners-up in the AFC U-23 Championship.

Since then, matches between Hoang Anh Gia Lai and Hà Nội have attracted substantial media coverage, as the competition extends beyond the field to include differing football philosophies and management approaches, particularly between their owners Đỗ Quang Hiển and Đoàn Nguyên Đức. Flares and bottle-throwing incidents have occurred during these matches, and tensions have occasionally escalated among players, fans, and even coaching staff. The intense nature of these encounters has often led to controversial referee decisions that impact the game's dynamics and outcomes.

=== Thể Công - Viettel ===
Similar to Công An Hà Nội, Thể Công-Viettel and Hà Nội are local football clubs based in Hanoi. The two teams first met officially during the 2008 Vietnamese Cup, before facing each other in V.League 1 for the first time in 2009. With the resurgence and rise of Viettel, the Hanoi Derby in 2020 was particularly tense, featuring two red cards, one for each team. They have faced each other 23 times in their history, with Hà Nội dominating Thể Công-Viettel with 10 wins, 6 draws and 7 losses.

=== Nam Định ===
Nam Định fans began to follow in Hải Phòng's footsteps by setting off flares at Hàng Đẫy Stadium as an act of revenge against Hà Nội. The situation escalated in Round 22 of the 2019 V-League. During the second half of the match between Hanoi and Nam Định, a flare launched from Stand B, where Nam Định fans were seated, shot toward Stand A, striking a female fan named Huyền Anh in the thigh. She suffered severe sulfur burns that affected her bone, requiring surgery.

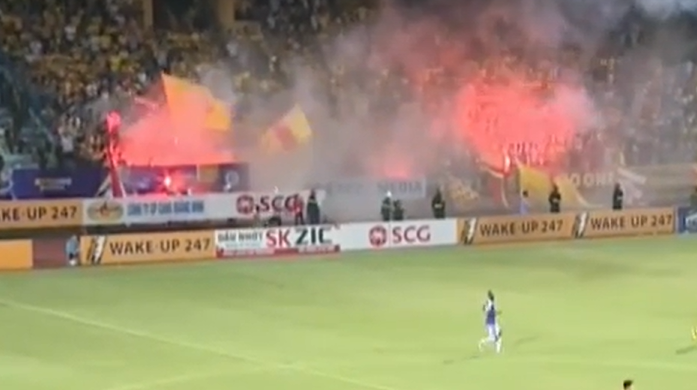
"Rain" of flares at Hàng Đẫy Stadium

This incident sparked outrage in the Vietnamese online community, with many condemning the extreme actions of some Nam Định fans. The police in Đống Đa district prosecuted the case and summoned 14 Nam Định fans for questioning. Nguyễn Đức Chung, Chairman of the Hanoi People's Committee, directed the City Police to focus on investigating, clarifying, and strictly handling those responsible for the incident.

The match organizers (BTC) imposed heavy penalties on those involved. Hà Nội was fined 85 million VND for failing to ensure match security. Nam Định was also fined 85 million VND, with 70 million VND for allowing fans to light flares and 15 million VND for throwing objects onto the field. Despite the incident, Hà Nội won the match 6–1.

=== Sông Lam Nghệ An ===
Sông Lam Nghệ An has always been a challenging opponent for both the former Hanoi T&T and the current Hanoi FC. The matches between these teams are always tense, sometimes even violent, with mixed results. Similar to their encounters with Hải Phòng, these games are intense both on the field and in the stands. Notably, it was Sông Lam Nghệ An who ended Hà Nội's 32-match unbeaten streak at home, coinciding with the club's anniversary. They have faced each other 29 times in their history with 12 wins, 12 draws and 2 losses.

== Academy development ==
In addition to their rising football success, Hà Nội has a network of youth football academies to develop talent for the club. Unlike other major football clubs, Hà Nội does not have a centralized youth academy. Instead, the youth teams are trained in various Hà Nội academies, including those in Gia Lâm, Bắc Giang, and Cửa Lò, with the latter sharing facilities with Sông Lam Nghệ An.

== Kit manufacturers and shirt sponsors ==
Period	Kit manufacturer	Shirt sponsor
2011–2021	(Italy) Kappa	T&T Group; BSH; Otran; Artexport; Tan Hoang Minh Group; Hoa Binh; SCG; Quang Ninh Port
2021–2026	(Japan) Jogarbola	T&T Group; Bamboo Airways; AAN Rice; Vinawind; Quang Ninh Port; BaF Meat; KITA Group
2026–present	(Germany) Adidas	No sponsor

== Stadium ==
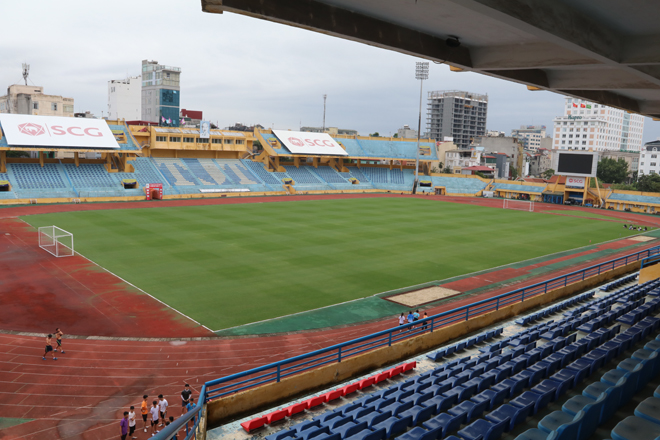
Hàng Đẫy Stadium.

Since its creation in 2006, Hà Nội has played at Hàng Đẫy Stadium in Đống Đa, Hanoi. The stadium was established on 1 January 1930 as a football field for Hanoi's École d’Éducation Physique (EDEP - School of Physical Education). Shortly after, EDEP was renamed Société d'Éducation Physique du Tonkin (SEPTO - Tonkin Society of Physical Education). From 1936 to 1938, a 400-seat wooden stand and bordering walls were constructed, and the stadium was subsequently known as SEPTO Stadium. On 16 February 1956, the stadium was rebuilt, and the new Hàng Đẫy Stadium was officially opened on 24 August 1958. The structure has remained largely unchanged since then, with some upgrades made in the 1990s.

In 2016, Hàng Đẫy Stadium was handed over to the club as a gesture recognizing the club's professionalism and success. During a visit to France by Nguyễn Phú Trọng, the General Secretary of the Communist Party of Vietnam, in 2018, he and French President Emmanuel Macron signed several cooperation agreements, including one for the rebuilding and renovation of the stadium. The new stadium, which will cost €2ffesigned and built by the French company Bouygues. However, due to various issues, the project has not yet been scheduled for implementation.

== Players ==
=== First-team squad ===
As of 2 October 2026

Note: Flags indicate national team as defined under FIFA eligibility rules; some limited exceptions apply. Players may hold more than one non-FIFA nationality.

No.	Pos.	Nation	Player
1	GK	VIE	Quan Văn Chuẩn
2	DF	VIE	Đỗ Duy Mạnh
3	DF	VIE	Lê Văn Hà
5	GK	VIE	Nguyễn Văn Hoàng
6	MF	CUW	Kevin Felida
7	DF	VIE	Phạm Xuân Mạnh
8	MF	VIE	Nguyễn Văn Trường
9	FW	FRA	Aymeric Faurand-Tournaire
10	FW	VIE	Nguyễn Văn Quyết (captain)
11	MF	VIE	Đỗ Hoàng Hên
14	MF	VIE	Nguyễn Hai Long
15	MF	VIE	Phạm Đức Huy
16	DF	VIE	Nguyễn Thành Chung
17	FW	VIE	Hồ Thanh Minh
18	FW	VIE	Bùi Ngọc Long

No.	Pos.	Nation	Player
19	FW	VIE	Lê Xuân Tú
20	MF	VIE	Đậu Hồng Phong
21	MF	VIE	Vũ Đình Hai
22	DF	VIE	Nguyễn Công Nhật (on loan from SHB Đà Nẵng)
23	FW	VIE	Nguyễn Văn Tùng
24	MF	VIE	Chu Ngọc Nguyễn Lực
29	DF	VIE	Nguyễn Đức Anh
33	DF	VIE	Nguyễn Anh Tiệp
35	DF	BRA	Adriel
36	MF	ISR	Yuval Sade
44	DF	IRL	Cyrus Christie
66	GK	VIE	Phạm Đình Hải
86	DF	VIE	Trần Văn Thắng
88	MF	VIE	Đỗ Hùng Dũng (vice-captain)
90	FW	FRA	Andrew Jung

=== Out on loan ===
Note: Flags indicate national team as defined under FIFA eligibility rules; some limited exceptions apply. Players may hold more than one non-FIFA nationality.

No.	Pos.	Nation	Player
24	DF	VIE	Vũ Văn Sơn (on loan to SHB Đà Nẵng until 1 July 2027)
26	DF	VIE	Nguyễn Xuân Kiên (on loan to Thái Nguyên until 1 July 2027)
64	DF	VIE	Nguyễn Sỹ Đức (on loan to Thái Nguyên until 1 July 2027)
68	DF	VIE	Vũ Tiến Long (on loan to Bắc Ninh until 1 July 2027)
79	DF	VIE	Mai Sỹ Hoàng (on loan to SHB Đà Nẵng until 1 July 2027)

No.	Pos.	Nation	Player
92	FW	VIE	Nguyễn Hà Anh Tuấn (on loan to Thái Nguyên until 1 July 2027)
—	DF	VIE	Chử Ngọc Diệp (on loan to Thái Nguyên until 1 July 2027)
—	DF	VIE	Vi Văn Dũng (on loan to Thái Nguyên until 1 July 2027)
—	MF	VIE	Bùi Tuấn Anh (on loan to Thái Nguyên until 1 July 2027)
—	MF	VIE	Nguyễn Thiên Phú (on loan to Thái Nguyên until 1 July 2027)

== Management and staff ==
Position	Name
Head coach	(Australia) Harry Kewell
Technical director	(Japan) Yusuke Adachi
Assistant coach	(Vietnam) Nguyễn Xuân Tú (Wales) Brian Stock (Republic of Ireland) Alan Maybury
Goalkeeper coach	(Vietnam) Dương Hồng Sơn
Fitness coach	(Brazil) Bruno Luís Inarra
Match analyst	(Vietnam) Vũ Đức Thành
Doctor	(Vietnam) Nguyễn Đức Thiện (Vietnam) Vũ Thành Luân
Physiotherapist	(Japan) Daisuke Nawa
Interpreter	(Vietnam) Lê Mạnh Hùng (Vietnam) Văn Bá An
Team manager	(Vietnam) Nguyễn Văn Đức

== Managerial history ==
2006–present

Name	Period	Honours
(Vietnam) Triệu Quang Hà	2006–2009	
(Vietnam) Nguyễn Hữu Thắng	2009	
(Vietnam) Phan Thanh Hùng	2010–2016	2010 V-League; 2010 Super Cup; 2013 V.League 1
(Vietnam) Phạm Minh Đức	2016	
(Vietnam) Chu Đình Nghiêm	2016–2021	2016 V.League 1; 2018 V.League 1; 2018 Super Cup; 2019 V.League 1; 2019 National Cup; 2019 Super Cup; 2020 National Cup; 2020 Super Cup
(Vietnam) Hoàng Văn Phúc (interim)	2021	
(South Korea) Park Choong-kyun	2021–2022	
(South Korea) Chun Jae-ho (interim)	2022	2022 V.League 1; 2022 National Cup
(Montenegro) Božidar Bandović	2023	2022 Super Cup
(Vietnam) Lê Đức Tuấn (interim)	2023	
(Vietnam) Đinh Thế Nam (interim)	2023–2024	
(Japan) Daiki Iwamasa	2024	
(Vietnam) Lê Đức Tuấn	2024–2025	
(Vietnam) Hoàng Văn Phúc (interim)	2025	
(Japan) Makoto Teguramori	2025	
(Japan) Yusuke Adachi (interim)	2025	
(Australia) Harry Kewell	2025–present	

== Honours ==
Hanoi FC is one of the most successful clubs in Vietnam and currently holds the title of the most successful club in the 21st century in terms of major trophies, despite only being established in 2006. The club's first trophy was the Vietnamese Third League, which they won as Hanoi T&T in 2006. In 2010, the club secured its first top-division league title. Since then, they have gone on to win a record 6 top-division titles and 3 Vietnamese Cups. These achievements have earned the club a record 8 appearances in the Vietnamese Super Cup, winning 5 of them.

=== National competitions ===
==== League ====
- V.League 1
  - Winners (6; record): 2010, 2013, 2016, 2018, 2019, 2022
  - Runners-up (7): 2011, 2012, 2014, 2015, 2020, 2023, 2024–25
- V.League 2
  - Runners-up (1): 2008
- Second League
  - Runners-up (1): 2007
- Third League
  - Winners (1) : 2006

==== Cup ====
- Vietnamese National Cup
  - Winners (3; record): 2019, 2020, 2022
  - Runners-up (4): 2012, 2015, 2016, 2023–24
- Vietnamese Super Cup
  - Winners (5; record): 2010, 2018, 2019, 2020, 2022
  - Runners-up (3) : 2013, 2015, 2016

=== Other ===
- Labor Order 3rd class: 2019

== Award winners ==
=== Domestic ===
- Player of the Season
  - (Argentina) Gonzalo Marronkle (2013)
  - (Vietnam) Nguyễn Văn Quyết (2018, 2020, 2022)
  - (Vietnam) Nguyễn Quang Hải (2019)
- League Golden Boot
  - (Vietnam) Hoàng Vũ Samson (2013, 2014)
  - (Argentina) Gonzalo Marronkle (2013)
  - (Nigeria) Oseni Ganiyu (2018)
  - (Senegal) Pape Omar Faye (2019)
  - (Jamaica) Rimario Gordon (2020)
- Young Player of the Season
  - (Vietnam) Đỗ Duy Mạnh (2015)
  - (Vietnam) Nguyễn Quang Hải (2017, 2018)
  - (Vietnam) Đoàn Văn Hậu (2019)
  - (Vietnam) Bùi Hoàng Việt Anh (2020)
- Manager of the Season
  - (Vietnam) Phan Thanh Hùng (2010, 2013, 2015)
  - (Vietnam) Chu Đình Nghiêm (2016, 2018)
  - (Montenegro) Božidar Bandović (2023)

== Season by season record ==
Season	League											Cup
Season	Division	Played	Won	Draw	Lost	GF	GA	GD	Pts	Final position	Notes	Vietnamese National Cup
2006	Third Division									1st	Promoted to the 2007 Second Division	Ineligible for Vietnamese Cup
2007	Second Division									2nd	Promoted to the 2008 First Division	Ineligible for Vietnamese Cup
2008	First Division	26	14	9	3	46	24	+22	51	2nd	Promoted to the 2009 V-League	First Round
2009	V-League	26	11	6	9	44	35	+9	39	4th		Round of 16
2010	V-League	26	14	4	8	35	25	+10	46	Champions	Qualified for the 2011 AFC Cup	First Round
2011	V-League	26	13	7	6	51	31	+20	46	2nd		Round of 16
2012	V-League	26	13	8	5	43	35	+8	47	2nd		Runner-up
2013	V.League 1	20	11	5	4	46	24	+22	38	Champions	Qualified for the 2014 AFC Champions League qualifying play-off	Quarter-finals
2014	V.League 1	22	14	5	3	66	40	+26	47	2nd	Qualified for the 2015 AFC Champions League qualifying play-off	Round of 16
2015	V.League 1	26	13	7	6	51	30	+21	46	2nd	Qualified for the 2016 AFC Champions League qualifying play-off	Runner-up
2016	V.League 1	26	16	2	8	45	28	+17	50	Champions	Qualified for the 2017 AFC Champions League qualifying play-off	Runner-up
2017	V.League 1	26	12	10	4	54	31	+23	46	3rd		Round of 16
2018	V.League 1	26	20	4	2	72	30	+42	64	Champions	Qualified for the 2019 AFC Champions League qualifying play-off	Semi-finals
2019	V.League 1	26	15	8	3	60	30	+30	53	Champions	Did not obtain a licence for the 2020 AFC Champions League	Winners
2020	V.League 1	20	11	6	3	37	16	+21	39	2nd		Winners
2021	V.League 1	12	5	1	6	17	14	+3	16	7th	Competition abandoned due to COVID-19 pandemic	Competition abandoned due to COVID-19 pandemic
2022	V.League 1	24	15	6	3	47	21	+26	51	Champions	Qualified for the 2023–24 AFC Champions League group stage	Winners
2023	V.League 1	20	11	5	4	35	22	+13	38	2nd		Round of 16
2023–24	V.League 1	26	13	4	9	45	37	+8	43	3rd		Runner-up
2024–25	V.League 1	26	14	7	5	46	25	+21	49	2nd		Round of 16
2025–26	V.League 1	26	14	4	8	48	30	+18	46	4th		First Round
2026–27	V.League 1											First Round

== Continental record ==
All results, both home and away, list Hanoi's goal tally first.

Season	Competition	Round	Club	Home	Away	Aggregate
2011	AFC Cup	Group G	(Thailand) Muangthong United	0–0	0–4	3rd
2011	AFC Cup	Group G	(Singapore) Tampines Rovers	1–1	1–3	3rd
2011	AFC Cup	Group G	(Maldives) Victory Sports Club	2–0	1–0	3rd
2014	AFC Champions League	Qualifying play-off round 1	(India) Pune	3–0		
2014	AFC Champions League	Qualifying play-off round 2	(Thailand) Muangthong United	0–2		
2014	AFC Cup	Group F	(Maldives) Maziya	5–1	2–1	1st
2014	AFC Cup	Group F	(Indonesia) Arema	2–1	3–1	1st
2014	AFC Cup	Group F	(Malaysia) Selangor	1–0	1–3	1st
2014	AFC Cup	Round of 16	(Myanmar) Nay Pyi Taw	5–0		
2014	AFC Cup	Quarter-finals	(Iraq) Erbil	0–1	0–2	0–3
2015	AFC Champions League	Preliminary round 2	(Indonesia) Persib Bandung	4–0		
2015	AFC Champions League	Play-off round	(South Korea) FC Seoul	0–7		
2016	AFC Champions League	Preliminary round 2	(Hong Kong) Kitchee	1–0		
2016	AFC Champions League	Play-off round	(South Korea) Pohang Steelers	0–3		
2017	AFC Champions League	Preliminary round 2	(Hong Kong) Kitchee	2–3		
2017	AFC Cup	Group G	(Philippines) Ceres–Negros	1–1	2–6	2nd
2017	AFC Cup	Group G	(Malaysia) Felda United	4–1	1–1	2nd
2017	AFC Cup	Group G	(Singapore) Tampines Rovers	4–0	2–1	2nd
2019	AFC Champions League	Preliminary round 2	(Thailand) Bangkok United	1–0		
2019	AFC Champions League	Play-off round	(China) Shandong Luneng	1–4		
2019	AFC Cup	Group F	(Cambodia) Nagaworld	10–0	5–1	1st
2019	AFC Cup	Group F	(Singapore) Tampines Rovers	2–0	1–1	1st
2019	AFC Cup	Group F	(Myanmar) Yangon United	0–1	5–2	1st
2019	AFC Cup	Zonal semi-finals	(Philippines) Ceres–Negros	2–1	1–1	3–2
2019	AFC Cup	Zonal finals	(Vietnam) Becamex Bình Dương	1–0	1–0	2–0
2019	AFC Cup	Inter-zone play-off semi-finals	(Turkmenistan) Altyn Asyr	3–2	2–2	5–4
2019	AFC Cup	Inter-zone play-off final	(North Korea) April 25	2–2	0–0	2–2 (a)
2023–24	AFC Champions League	Group J	(China) Wuhan Three Towns	2–1	1–2	3rd
2023–24	AFC Champions League	Group J	(South Korea) Pohang Steelers	2–4	0–2	3rd
2023–24	AFC Champions League	Group J	(Japan) Urawa Red Diamonds	2–1	0–6	3rd

== See also ==
- Thái Nguyên T&T W.F.C.
