= 2025–26 Vietnamese Cup =

2025–26 Vietnamese National Cup

Tournament details
- Country: Vietnam
- Dates: 13 September 2025 – 14 June 2026
- Teams: 25

Final positions
- Champions: Cong An Ho Chi Minh City (3rd title)
- Runners-up: Ninh Binh
- ASEAN Club Championship: Cong An Ho Chi Minh City

Tournament statistics
- Matches played: 23
- Goals scored: 63 (2.74 per match)
- Attendance: 131,250 (5,707 per match)
- Top goal scorer(s): Lucão do Break; Geovane Magno; Lee Williams (3 goals)
- Goals scored in penalty shoot-outs not included.

The 2025–26 Vietnamese National Cup (Vietnamese: Giải bóng đá Cúp Quốc gia 2025/26), also known as LPBank Securities - National Cup 2025–26 (Vietnamese: Giải bóng đá Cúp Quốc gia Chứng Khoán LPBank 2025/26) for sponsorship reasons, is the 34th edition of the Vietnamese National Football Cup, the premier knockout competition in Vietnamese football. A total of 25 clubs compete in this edition, including 11 teams from the second tier of the Vietnamese football league system. The competition began on 13 September 2025 with the qualifying round matches, and will conclude in June 2026 with the final.

Cong An Ho Chi Minh City won their record-extending 3rd title, after defeating Ninh Binh in the final.

V.League 1 team Cong An Hanoi were the defending champions after winning their first title in the previous edition, but they were eliminated by The Cong-Viettel by 3–4 in penalty shoot-out after 2–2 draw in the round of 16.

The winner of the Vietnamese Cup earns automatic qualification for the group stage of the 2026–27 editions of the ASEAN Club Championship. The winners will also host the 2026 edition of the Vietnamese Super Cup at the start of the next season, and will face the champions of the 2025–26 V.League 1, Cong An Hanoi.

== Background ==
The Vietnamese Cup is a knockout competition with 26 teams taking part from the first round proper, and all trying to reach the final on 14 June 2026. The tournament consists of 14 teams from V.League 1 and 12 teams from V.League 2 to compete. Being a reserves team, V.League 2 side PVF-CAND B are ineligible to enter the competition.

Before the start of the tournament, Hoa Binh withdrew from the Vietnamese professional football system, thus reducing the number of participating teams to 25.

Round	Main date	Number of fixtures	Clubs remaining	New entries this round	Winner prize money (VND)
Qualifying Round	12–14 September 2025	9	19 → 10	Hoa Binh withdrew from the tournament, giving Khatoco Khanh Hoa a walkover to the next stage	10,000,000₫
Round of 16	November 2025	8	10+6 → 8	6 V.League 1 teams entered directly from the Round of 16 based on the draw results	20,000,000₫
Quarter-finals	March 2026	4	8 → 4		30,000,000₫
Semi-finals	June 2026	2	4 → 2		400,000,000₫ (Note: Semi-finalist only)
Final	28 June 2026	1	2 → 1		2,000,000,000₫

== Matches ==
All times are local (UTC+7)

=== Qualifying round ===
The draw took place alongside the round of 16 and the V.League 2 fixtures draw on 11 August 2025. The matches took place between 12 and 14 September 2025.

Number of teams per tier still in competition
V.League 1	V.League 2	Total
14 / 14	12 / 12	26 / 26

12 September 2025	Ho Chi Minh City FC (2)	1–0	Dong Thap (2)	Ho Chi Minh City
16:00	Đoàn Hải Quân 60'	Report		Stadium: Bà Rịa Stadium; Attendance: 1,000; Referee: Phan Văn Tuấn

12 September 2025	Khatoco Khanh Hoa (2)	Cancelled	Hoa Binh (2)	Khánh Hòa
17:00		Report		Stadium: 19 August Nha Trang Stadium
Note: Khatoco Khanh Hoa automatically qualified to the next stage as Hoa Binh withdrew from the Vietnamese professional football system.

13 September 2025	Long An (2)	1–1 (3–1 p)	Quy Nhon United (2)	Tây Ninh
16:00	Nguyễn Thanh Hải 56' (pen.)	Report	Trần Văn Thái 27'	Stadium: Long An Stadium; Attendance: 1,500; Referee: Võ Hoài Thương
	Penalties
	Nguyễn Anh Tài (penalty scored); Nguyễn Trọng Đại (penalty scored); Nguyễn Đình Mạnh (penalty scored)		Cao Văn Triền (penalty missed); Nguyễn Ngọc Toàn (penalty scored); Phan Ngọc Tín (penalty missed); Tháileon (penalty missed)

13 September 2025	Xuan Thien Phu Tho (2)	2–4	Ninh Binh (1)	Phú Thọ
16:00	Nguyễn Trọng Bảo 20', 49'	Report	Lê Hải Đức 3', 7'; Geovane Magno 65'; Nguyễn Hoàng Đức 87'	Stadium: Việt Trì Stadium; Attendance: 3,000; Referee: Nguyễn Nhật Minh

13 September 2025	Dong A Thanh Hoa (1)	0–2	Hoang Anh Gia Lai (1)	Thanh Hóa
18:00		Report	Trần Gia Bảo 61'; Cao Hoàng Minh 88'	Stadium: Thanh Hóa Stadium; Attendance: 4,000; Referee: Nguyễn Ngọc Tùng

14 September 2025	Van Hien University (2)	0–1	Bac Ninh (2)	Ho Chi Minh City
16:00		Report	Phan Văn Hiếu 68'	Stadium: Thống Nhất Stadium; Attendance: 1,800; Referee: Khổng Tam Cường

14 September 2025	Hong Linh Ha Tinh (1)	1–0	Quang Ninh (2)	Hà Tĩnh
18:00	Phạm Văn Long 90+7'	Report		Stadium: Hà Tĩnh Stadium; Attendance: 2,500; Referee: Lê Đức Cảnh

14 September 2025	SHB Da Nang (1)	2–0	Ho Chi Minh City Youth (2)	Đà Nẵng
18:00	Nguyễn Hồng Phúc 18'; David Henen 54' (pen.)	Report		Stadium: Hòa Xuân Stadium; Attendance: 2,000; Referee: Trương Hồng Vũ

14 September 2025	Truong Tuoi Dong Nai (2)	3–1	Becamex Ho Chi Minh City (1)	Đồng Nai
19:15	Alex Sandro 6' (pen.); Trần Minh Vương 62'; Lưu Tự Nhân 76'	Report	Cao Quốc Khánh 22'	Stadium: Bình Phước Stadium; Attendance: 10,000; Referee: Đỗ Thành Đệ

14 September 2025	The Cong-Viettel (1)	1–0	Hanoi FC (1)	Hanoi
19:15	Pedro Henrique 79'	Report		Stadium: Hàng Đẫy Stadium; Attendance: 5,000; Referee: Hoàng Thanh Bình

=== Round of 16 ===
The 10 out of 16 winners from the qualifying round played in the round of 16. The matches took place from 15 November 2025 to 28 January 2026, the fixtures were released on 15 October 2025.

Number of teams per tier still in competition
V.League 1	V.League 2	Total
11 / 14	5 / 12	16 / 26

15 November 2025	Khatoco Khanh Hoa (2)	0–0 (4–5 p)	Bac Ninh (2)	Khánh Hòa
17:00		Report		Stadium: 19 August Nha Trang Stadium; Attendance: 2,000; Referee: Đặng Quốc Dũng
	Penalties
	Trần Văn Tùng (penalty missed); Huỳnh Kim Hùng (penalty scored); Trần Khánh Dũng (penalty scored); Quách Công Đình (penalty scored); Dương Văn Kiên (penalty scored); Nguyễn Khắc Khiêm (penalty missed)		Phan Văn Hiếu (penalty scored); Hoàng Xuân Tân (penalty scored); Hà Đức Chinh (penalty scored); Eddie Tran (penalty missed); Nguyễn Văn Đạt (penalty scored); Kainã (penalty scored)

16 November 2025	Song Lam Nghe An (1)	2–3	SHB Da Nang (1)	Nghệ An
18:00	Olaha 79' (pen.), 90'	Report	Đặng Anh Tuấn 5'; Makarić 28'; Phạm Đình Duy 88'	Stadium: Vinh Stadium; Attendance: 4,300; Referee: Trần Ngọc Ánh

22 November 2025	Truong Tuoi Dong Nai (2)	2–0	Hong Linh Ha Tinh (1)	Đồng Nai
18:00	Trần Minh Vương 27'; Sandro 70'	Report		Stadium: Bình Phước Stadium; Attendance: 5,800; Referee: Trần Ngọc Nhớ

23 November 2025	Thep Xanh Nam Dinh (1)	2–0	Long An (2)	Ninh Bình
18:00	Brenner 71'; Lâm Ti Phông 84'	Report		Stadium: Thiên Trường Stadium; Attendance: 6,000; Referee: Hoàng Thanh Bình

23 November 2025	Haiphong (1)	1–2	Ninh Binh (1)	Hải Phòng
19:00	Nguyễn Hữu Nam 10'	Report	Nguyễn Hữu Thái Bảo 69' (o.g.); dos Anjos 90' (pen.)	Stadium: Lạch Tray Stadium; Attendance: 8,500; Referee: Nguyễn Ngọc Tùng

23 November 2025	Cong An Hanoi (1)	2–2 (3–4 p)	The Cong-Viettel (1)	Hanoi
19:15	Lê Văn Đô 32'; Mauk 77'	Report	Cao Pendant Quang Vinh 45' (o.g.); Lucão 90+5' (pen.)	Stadium: Hàng Đẫy Stadium; Attendance: 12,650; Referee: Lê Vũ Linh
	Penalties
	Artur (penalty scored); Cao Pendant Quang Vinh (penalty missed); Gomes (penalty scored); Mauk (penalty missed); Lê Văn Đô (penalty scored)		Trương Tiến Anh (penalty scored); Khuất Văn Khang (penalty scored); Đinh Xuân Tiến (penalty scored); Wesley (penalty missed); Lucão (penalty scored)

23 November 2025	Cong An Ho Chi Minh City (1)	3–0	Ho Chi Minh City FC (2)	Ho Chi Minh City
19:15	Nguyễn Tiến Linh 8'; Williams 43'; Endrick 54' (pen.)	Report		Stadium: Thống Nhất Stadium; Attendance: 5,000; Referee: Võ Hoài Thương

24 January 2026	PVF-CAND (1)	0–0 (5–3 p)	Hoang Anh Gia Lai (1)	Hưng Yên
18:00		Report		Stadium: PVF Stadium; Attendance: 500; Referee: Nguyễn Kim Việt Bảo
	Penalties
	Amarildo (penalty scored); Mpande (penalty scored); Nguyễn Bảo Long (penalty scored); Hà Văn Việt (penalty scored); Thái Bá Đạt (penalty scored)		Jairo (penalty scored); Nguyễn Hữu Anh Tài (penalty scored); Cao Hoàng Minh (penalty missed); Marciel (penalty scored)

=== Quarter-finals ===
The 8 winners from the round of 16 played in the quarter-finals. The matches took place between 18 and 21 March 2026.

Number of teams per tier still in competition
V.League 1	V.League 2	Total
6 / 14	2 / 12	8 / 26

18 March 2026	SHB Da Nang (1)	1–2	Thep Xanh Nam Dinh (1)	Đà Nẵng
18:00	Nguyễn Phi Hoàng 58'	Report	Nguyễn Xuân Son 28'; Akolo 39'	Stadium: Chi Lăng Stadium (Note: On 24 December 2025, Hoà Xuân Stadium officially changed its name to Chi Lăng); Attendance: 5,500; Referee: Lê Đức Tuấn

20 March 2026	Cong An Ho Chi Minh City (1)	1–0	Truong Tuoi Dong Nai (2)	Ho Chi Minh City
19:15	Ngo 76' (pen.)	Report		Stadium: Thống Nhất Stadium; Attendance: 8,000; Referee: Trần Ngọc Nhớ

21 March 2026	Ninh Binh (1)	3–2	PVF-CAND (1)	Ninh Bình
18:00	Nguyễn Văn Dũng 30' (o.g.); Geovane 68'; Phạm Gia Hưng 90+3'	Report	Eid 35'; Nguyễn Vũ Tín 86'	Stadium: Ninh Bình Stadium; Attendance: 7,000; Referee: Trần Ngọc Ánh

21 March 2026	The Cong-Viettel (1)	1–0	Bac Ninh (2)	Hanoi
19:15	Lucão 14'	Report		Stadium: Hàng Đẫy Stadium; Attendance: 7,000; Referee: Võ Hoài Thương

=== Semi-finals ===
The four winners from the quarter-finals played in the semi-finals. The matches will take place on 11 June 2026, the fixtures were released on 13 May 2026.

Number of teams per tier still in competition
V.League 1	V.League 2	Total
4 / 14	0 / 12	4 / 26

11 June 2026	Thep Xanh Nam Dinh (1)	2–4	Cong An Ho Chi Minh City (1)	Ninh Bình
18:00	Nguyễn Xuân Son 71'; Lý Công Hoàng Anh 79'	Report	Utzig 18'; Felipe 23'; Williams 37'; Khổng Minh Gia Bảo 43'	Stadium: Thiên Trường Stadium; Attendance: 5,000; Referee: Nazmi Nasaruddin (Malaysia)

11 June 2026	Ninh Binh (1)	4–1	The Cong-Viettel (1)	Ninh Bình
18:00	Phạm Gia Hưng 15'; Nguyễn Hoàng Đức 42'; Trần Bảo Toàn 86'; Friday 89'	Report	Lucão 84' (pen.)	Stadium: Ninh Bình Stadium; Attendance: 11,000; Referee: Wiwat Jumpaoon (Thailand)

=== Final ===
14 June 2026
18:00 UTC+7

Ninh Binh	1–2	Cong An Ho Chi Minh City
Geovane 74' (pen.)	Report	Utzig 16'; Williams 34'

Ninh Bình Stadium, Ninh Bình
Attendance: 12,000
Referee: Muhammad Taqi (Singapore)

== Bracket ==
Qualifying round
12 September 2025; Bà Rịa
Ho Chi Minh City FC (2)	1
Dong Thap (3)	0
14 September 2025; Bình Phước
Truong Tuoi Dong Nai (4)	3
Becamex Ho Chi Minh City (5)	1
14 September 2025; Hà Tĩnh
Hong Linh Ha Tinh (6)	1
Quang Ninh (7)	0
14 September 2025; Hòa Xuân
SHB Da Nang (9)	2
Ho Chi Minh City Youth (10)	0
13 September 2025; Long An
Long An (p) (12)	1 (3)
Quy Nhon United (13)	1 (1)
14 September 2025; Hàng Đẫy
The Cong-Viettel (15)	1
Hanoi FC (16)	0
September 2025; 19 August Nha Trang
Khatoco Khanh Hoa (17)	w/o
Hoa Binh (18)
14 September 2025; Thống Nhất
Van Hien University (19)	0
Bac Ninh (20)	1
13 September 2025; Việt Trì
Xuan Thien Phu Tho (22)	2
Ninh Binh (23)	4
13 September 2025; Thanh Hóa
Dong A Thanh Hoa (25)	0
Hoang Anh Gia Lai (26)	2

Round of 16
23 November 2025; Thống Nhất
Cong An Ho Chi Minh City (1)	3
Ho Chi Minh City FC (2)	0
22 November 2025; Bình Phước
Truong Tuoi Dong Nai (4)	2
Hong Linh Ha Tinh (6)	0
16 November 2025; Vinh
Song Lam Nghe An (8)	2
SHB Da Nang (9)	3
23 November 2025; Thiên Trường
Thep Xanh Nam Dinh (11)	2
Long An (12)	0
23 November 2025; Hàng Đẫy
Cong An Hanoi (14)	2 (3)
The Cong-Viettel (p) (15)	2 (4)
15 November 2025; 19 August Nha Trang
Khatoco Khanh Hoa (17)	0 (4)
Bac Ninh (p) (20)	0 (5)
23 November 2025; Lạch Tray
Haiphong (21)	1
Ninh Binh (23)	2
24 January 2026; PVF
PVF-CAND (24)	0 (5)
Hoang Anh Gia Lai (26)	0 (3)

Quarter-finals
20 March 2026; Thống Nhất
Cong An Ho Chi Minh City (1)	1
Truong Tuoi Dong Nai (4)	0
18 March 2026; Chi Lăng
SHB Da Nang (9)	1
Thep Xanh Nam Dinh (11)	2
21 March 2026; Hàng Đẫy
The Cong-Viettel (15)	1
Bac Ninh (20)	0
21 March 2026; Ninh Bình
Ninh Binh (23)	3
PVF-CAND (24)	2

Semi-finals
11 June 2026; Thiên Trường
Thep Xanh Nam Dinh (11)	2
Cong An Ho Chi Minh City (1)	4
11 June 2026; Ninh Bình
Ninh Binh (23)	4
The Cong-Viettel (15)	1

Final
14 June 2026; Ninh Bình
Cong An Ho Chi Minh City (1)	2
Ninh Binh (23)	1

== Top goalscorers ==
The following were the top scorers of the Vietnamese Cup, sorted first by number of goals, and then alphabetically if necessary. Goals scored in penalty shoot-outs are not included.

Rank	Player	Team	Goals
1	(Brazil) Lucão do Break	The Cong-Viettel	3
1	(Brazil) Geovane Magno	Ninh Binh	3
1	(England) Lee Williams	Cong An Ho Chi Minh City	3
4	(Vietnam) Lê Hải Đức	Ninh Binh	2
4	(Nigeria) Michael Olaha	Song Lam Nghe An	2
4	(Vietnam) Nguyễn Trọng Bảo	Xuan Thien Phu Tho / Thep Xanh Nam Dinh	2
4	(Vietnam) Trần Minh Vương	Truong Tuoi Dong Nai	2
4	(Vietnam) Nguyễn Xuân Son	Thep Xanh Nam Dinh	2
4	(Vietnam) Phạm Gia Hưng	Ninh Binh	2
4	(Brazil) Raphael Utzig	Cong An Ho Chi Minh City	2
4	(Vietnam) Nguyễn Hoàng Đức	Ninh Binh	2
12	Other players		1
