= 2025–26 V.League 2 =

32nd season of the second-highest division of association football in Vietnam

V.League 2
- Season: 2025–26
- Dates: 19 September 2025 – 6 June 2026
- Champions: Truong Tuoi Dong Nai; 1st VL2 title First 2nd tier title
- Promoted: Truong Tuoi Dong Nai; Bac Ninh (via play-off)
- Relegated: Ho Chi Minh City Youth
- Matches: 132
- Goals: 334 (2.53 per match)
- Top goalscorer: Tháileon (14 goals)
- Biggest home win: Bac Ninh 8–0 Ho Chi Minh City Youth (24 May 2026)
- Biggest away win: Xuan Thien Phu Tho 1–4 Quy Nhon United FC (3 April 2026)
- Highest scoring: Bac Ninh 8–0 Ho Chi Minh City Youth (24 May 2026)
- Longest winning run: Truong Tuoi Dong Nai (3 matches)
- Longest unbeaten run: Truong Tuoi Dong Nai (17 matches)
- Longest winless run: Ho Chi Minh City Youth (16 matches)
- Longest losing run: Ho Chi Minh City Youth (6 matches)
- Highest attendance: 10,000; Truong Tuoi Dong Nai 6–0 Ho Chi Minh City Youth (2 May 2026)
- Lowest attendance: 300; PVF-CAND B 2–1 Long An (27 September 2025); PVF-CAND B 1–2 Ho Chi Minh City (15 May 2026); Xuan Thien Phu Tho 0–2 Dong Thap (25 May 2026)
- Attendance: 290,300 (2,199 per match)

The 2025–26 V.League 2 (Vietnamese: Giải bóng đá Hạng Nhất Quốc gia 2025/26) (referred to as the 2025–26 Gold Star Beer V.League 2 for sponsorship purposes, Vietnamese: Giải bóng đá Hạng Nhất Quốc gia Bia Sao Vàng 2025/26) was the 32nd season of the V.League 2. It began on 19 September 2025 and concluded on 6 June 2026.

The fixtures were drawn and released on 11 August 2025 at 10:00 ICT, alongside a draw of both of the qualifying round and the round of 16 on Vietnamese Cup.

For the first time since the 2014 season, V.League 2 teams are allowed to register foreign player without Vietnamese heritage.

== Teams ==
Locations of the 2025–26 V.League 2 teams
Locations of Ho Chi Minh City teams

=== Format changes ===
Starting from this season, V.League 2 has 14 teams, and promotion spot has now been increased from 1,5 spots to 2 spots. There will also be 2 relegation spots. However, following Dong Nai's non-registration for the league and Lam Dong's refusal to promote (to replace PVF-CAND promoted to the V.League 1), the league was left with 13 teams. On 8 September, after Phu Tho's withdrawal from the league, the number participating teams was reduced to 12 teams.

On 16 September 2025, following the number of planned participant teams decreased, Vietnam Football Federation announced that there would be 1,5 promotion spots and 1 relegation spot, similar to previous season.

=== Team changes ===
Promoted from 2025 Second Division	Relegated from 2024–25 V.League 1	Promoted to 2025–26 V.League 1	Relegated to 2026 Second Division	Not engaged
Bac Ninh; Gia Dinh; Quang Ninh; PVF-CAND B Van Hien University	Quy Nhon Binh Dinh	Phu Dong Ninh Binh; PVF-CAND	Hue	Dong Nai; Phu Tho

=== Name changes ===
- On 14 July 2025, Ba Ria-Vung Tau FC changed their name to Ho Chi Minh City FC.
- On 1 August 2025, Truong Tuoi Binh Phuoc FC changed their name to Truong Tuoi Dong Nai FC.
- On 29 August 2025, Quy Nhon Binh Dinh FC changed their name to Quy Nhon United FC.
- On 6 September 2025, Hoa Binh FC changed their name to Phu Tho FC. However, two days after the name change, the club withdrew from the league after their main sponsor pulled out.
- On 11 September 2025, Gia Dinh FC changed their name to Xuan Thien Phu Tho and relocated from Ho Chi Minh City to Phú Thọ.

=== Stadiums and locations ===
Team	Location	Stadium	Capacity	Previous season rank
Bac Ninh FC	Bac Ninh	Việt Yên	7,500	SD (2nd, GrA)
Dong Thap FC	Dong Thap	Cao Lãnh	23,000	VL2 (6th)
Ho Chi Minh City FC	Ho Chi Minh City	Bà Rịa	10,000	VL2 (10th)
Van Hien University (Note: From February 2026, as the Thống Nhất Stadium went under renovation work, Van Hien University changed their home stadium to Bà Rịa.)	Ho Chi Minh City	Bà Rịa	10,000	SD (1st, GrB)
Khatoco Khanh Hoa	Khanh Hoa	19 August Nha Trang	18,000	VL2 (5th)
Long An	Tay Ninh	Long An	20,000	VL2 (8th)
PVF-CAND B	Hung Yen	PVF	4,500	SD (3rd, GrA)
Quang Ninh FC	Quang Ninh	Cẩm Phả	20,000	SD (1st, GrA)
Ho Chi Minh City Youth (Note: From February 2026, Ho Chi Minh City Youth relocated from Ho Chi Minh City to Gia Lai, changing their new home stadium from Thông Nhất to Pleiku.)	Gia Lai	Pleiku	12,000	VL2 (4th)
Quy Nhon United	Gia Lai	Quy Nhon	15,000	VL1 (14th)
Truong Tuoi Dong Nai	Dong Nai	Bình Phước	11,000	VL2 (2nd)
Xuan Thien Phu Tho	Phu Tho	Việt Trì	20,000	SD (2nd, GrB)

=== Number of teams by region ===
Number	Region	Team(s)
5	Southeast	Ho Chi Minh City FC, Ho Chi Minh City Youth, Long An, Truong Tuoi Dong Nai and Van Hien University
3	Red River Delta	Bac Ninh, PVF-CAND B and Xuan Thien Phu Tho
2	South Central	Khatoco Khanh Hoa and Quy Nhon United
1	Mekong Delta	Dong Thap
1	Northeast	Quang Ninh

== Personnel and kits ==
All teams were obligated to have the logo of the league sponsor Bia Sao Vàng on their left sleeve.

Team	Manager	Captain	Kit manufacturer	Shirt sponsor(s)	
Team	Manager	Captain	Kit manufacturer	Main	Other(s)
Bac Ninh	(Brazil) Paulo Foiani	(Vietnam) Nguyễn Hải Huy	(Vietnam) Kamito	None	List: Front: None; Back: None; Sleeves: None; Shorts: None
Dong Thap	(Vietnam) Ngô Quang Sang	(Vietnam) Nguyễn Hữu Khôi	(Vietnam) Bulbal	Nakydaco	List: Front: Comoon, H Petro, Văn Hiến University; Back: Ochao; Sleeves: None; Shorts: None
Ho Chi Minh City FC	(Vietnam) Nguyễn Minh Phương	(Vietnam) Nguyễn Thanh Thắng	(Vietnam) Wika	Mansion Sports	List: Front: None; Back: None; Sleeves: None; Shorts: None
Ho Chi Minh City Youth	(Vietnam) Lương Trung Tuấn	(Vietnam) Phan Đình Vũ Hải	(Vietnam) Motive	ThaiGroup	List: Front: None; Back: LPBank; Sleeves: None; Shorts: None
Khatoco Khanh Hoa	(Vietnam) Trần Trọng Bình	(Vietnam) Nguyễn Tuấn Mạnh	(Vietnam) Kamito	Khatoco (H) / VietOstrich (A) / Yang Bay (3rd)	List: Front: None; Back: Khatoco; Sleeves: None; Shorts: None
Long An	(Vietnam) Trịnh Văn Hậu	(Vietnam) Nguyễn Thanh Hải	(Thailand) Grand Sport	Five Star International Group	List: Front: None; Back: None; Sleeves: None; Shorts: None
PVF-CAND B	(Vietnam) Nguyễn Duy Đông	(Vietnam) Mạc Đức Việt Anh	(Japan) Jogarbola	KinhBac City Development Holding	List: Front: None; Back: None; Sleeves: None; Shorts: None
Quang Ninh	(Vietnam) Nguyễn Văn Đàn	(Vietnam) Bùi Văn Hiếu	(Spain) Kelme	None	List: Front: None; Back: None; Sleeves: None; Shorts: None
Quy Nhon United	(Vietnam) Trịnh Duy Quang	(Vietnam) Cao Văn Triền	(Vietnam) Kamito	MerryLand Quy Nhơn	List: Front: None; Back: None; Sleeves: None; Shorts: None
Truong Tuoi Dong Nai	(Vietnam) Nguyễn Việt Thắng	(Vietnam) Bùi Tấn Trường	(Japan) Jogarbola	Trường Tươi Group	List: Front: None; Back: None; Sleeves: None; Shorts: None
Van Hien University	(Vietnam) Hoàng Hải Dương	(Vietnam) Lương Quốc Thắng	(Vietnam) Made by club	Văn Hiến University	List: Front: HAPPYFOOD, Ecobook, Comoon, Wecode; Back: Ochao; Sleeves: None; Shorts: None
Xuan Thien Phu Tho	(Vietnam) Lê Quốc Vượng	(Vietnam) Hoàng Minh Tuấn	(Japan) Jogarbola	Xuân Thiện Group	List: Front: None; Back: None; Sleeves: None; Shorts: None

=== Managerial changes ===
Team	Outgoing manager	Manner of departure	Date of vacancy	Position in table	Incoming manager	Date of appointment
Ho Chi Minh City Youth	(Vietnam) Trần Duy Quang	End of contract	1 July 2025	Pre-season	(Vietnam) Võ Hồng Phúc	27 August 2025
Long An	(Vietnam) Trịnh Duy Quang	End of contract	1 July 2025	Pre-season	(Vietnam) Nguyễn Văn Sỹ	12 August 2025
Quy Nhon United	(Vietnam) Trần Minh Chiến	End of interim period	1 July 2025	Pre-season	(Vietnam) Trịnh Duy Quang	1 August 2025
Truong Tuoi Dong Nai	(Vietnam) Huỳnh Quốc Anh	Mutual consent	11 July 2025	Pre-season	(Vietnam) Nguyễn Việt Thắng	17 July 2025
Bac Ninh	(Vietnam) Phạm Hùng Vương	Mutual consent	23 July 2025	Pre-season	(Brazil) Paulo Foiani	23 July 2025
Xuan Thien Phu Tho	(Vietnam) Hoàng Nhật Nam	Mutual consent	4 August 2025	Pre-season	(Vietnam) Huỳnh Quốc Anh	4 August 2025
PVF-CAND B	(Vietnam) Nguyễn Anh Tuấn	Appointed as assistant coach	12 August 2025	Pre-season	(Vietnam) Nguyễn Duy Đông	12 August 2025
Xuan Thien Phu Tho	(Vietnam) Huỳnh Quốc Anh	Mutual consent	16 August 2025	Pre-season	(Brazil) Flavio Cruz	31 August 2025
Long An	(Vietnam) Nguyễn Văn Sỹ	Appointed as technical director	11 September 2025	Pre-season	(Vietnam) Nguyễn Ngọc Linh	11 September 2025
Xuan Thien Phu Tho	(Brazil) Flavio Cruz	Sacked	15 September 2025	Pre-season	(Vietnam) Lê Quốc Vượng	17 September 2025
Dong Thap	(Vietnam) Phan Thanh Bình	Demoted to assistant manager	6 November 2025	11th	(Vietnam) Ngô Quang Sang	7 November 2025
Long An	(Vietnam) Nguyễn Ngọc Linh	Demoted to assistant manager	9 March 2026	10th	(Vietnam) Trịnh Văn Hậu	9 March 2026
Ho Chi Minh City Youth	(Vietnam) Võ Hồng Phúc	Sacked	10 March 2026	12th	(Vietnam) Lương Trung Tuấn	10 March 2026

== Foreign players ==
Teams can to register one foreign player and will be allotted two extra slot for 2 unnaturalized overseas Vietnamese player that will not be counted against their foreign player allotment.

Players name in bold indicates the player was registered after the start of the season.

Club	Player 1	Player 2 (Unnaturalized Vietnamese player)	Player 3 (Unnaturalized Vietnamese player)	Unregistred / Former players
Bac Ninh	(Brazil) **Bruno Cantanhede**	(Sweden) Eddie Tran		(Brazil) Kainã
Dong Thap	(Brazil) **Romário Alves**			(Brazil) Jhon Cley
Ho Chi Minh City FC	(Jamaica) **Jermie Lynch**	(United States) Zan Nguyen		
Ho Chi Minh City Youth	(Brazil) Victor Sales	(France) **Evan Abran**		
Khatoco Khanh Hoa				
Long An	(Brazil) **Thoni Brandão**			(Russia) Ivan Khleborodov (Ukraine) Mykyta Martynenko
PVF-CAND B	(Trinidad and Tobago) Shaqkeem Joseph	(United States) Mark Huynh		(Colombia) Orlando Berrío
Quang Ninh				
Quy Nhon United	(Brazil) Tháileon			
Truong Tuoi Dong Nai	(Brazil) Alex Sandro			
Van Hien University	(Haiti) **Watz-Landy Leazard**			(Jamaica) Jermie Lynch
Xuan Thien Phu Tho	(Cameroon) **Richmond Nji**			(Brazil) Jeferson Elías (Brazil) Yago Ramos

=== Dual nationality Vietnamese players ===
- Players name in **bold** indicates the player was registered after the start of the season.
- Player's name in italics indicates Overseas Vietnamese players whom have obtained a Vietnamese passport and citizenship, therefore being considered as local players.

Club	Player 1	Player 2
Bac Ninh		
Dong Thap		
Ho Chi Minh City FC	(Czech Republic) (Vietnam) Hồ Hữu Hưng	(France) (Vietnam) A Sân
Ho Chi Minh City Youth		
Khatoco Khanh Hoa	(Czech Republic) (Vietnam) Hoàng Minh Kiên	
Long An		
PVF-CAND B		
Quang Ninh		
Quy Nhon United		
Truong Tuoi Dong Nai		
Van Hien University		
Xuan Thien Phu Tho	(Canada) (Vietnam) Trần Khánh Hưng	

Notes:

^{1} Capped for Vietnam national team.
^{2} Player is under the process of Vietnamese naturalization, thus is not counted as a foreign player slot.

== League table ==
Pos	Team	Pld	W	D	L	GF	GA	GD	Pts	Promotion, qualification or relegation
1	Truong Tuoi Dong Nai (C, P)	22	15	5	2	47	14	+33	50	Promotion to V.League 1
2	Bac Ninh (O, P)	22	13	6	3	41	23	+18	45	Qualification for promotion play-offs
3	Ho Chi Minh City FC	22	11	5	6	33	22	+11	38	
4	Quy Nhon United	22	10	5	7	38	31	+7	35	
5	Xuan Thien Phu Tho	22	9	6	7	34	32	+2	33	
6	PVF-CAND B (Note: PVF-CAND B cannot promote to the V.League 1 as the club cannot compete in the same division as their A team.)	22	8	8	6	34	26	+8	32	
7	Van Hien University	22	7	7	8	21	24	−3	28	
8	Khatoco Khanh Hoa	22	7	6	9	21	23	−2	27	
9	Quang Ninh	22	6	8	8	23	26	−3	26	
10	Dong Thap	22	5	9	8	16	21	−5	24	
11	Long An	22	3	5	14	11	30	−19	14	
12	Ho Chi Minh City Youth (R)	22	1	4	17	15	62	−47	7	Relegation to Vietnamese Second Division

Source: VPF
Rules for classification: 1) Points; 2) Head-to-head points; 3) Head-to-head goal difference; 4) Head-to-head goals scored; 5) Goal difference; 6) Goals scored; 7) Away goals scored; 8) Fair-play points.
(C) Champions; (O) Play-off winners; (P) Promoted; (R) Relegated

== Results ==
Home \ Away	BNI	DTH	HCM	HCY	KHA	LAN	PVF	QNI	QNU	TDN	VHU	XPT
Bac Ninh	—	1–0	2–3	8–0	1–0	2–1	3–1	3–2	3–1	2–1	0–2	1–1
Dong Thap	0–1	—	1–1	3–1	2–0	1–1	0–0	0–1	1–1	0–0	1–0	1–1
Ho Chi Minh City FC	0–1	2–0	—	5–0	1–0	0–0	2–1	1–0	3–0	0–1	0–0	3–4
Ho Chi Minh City Youth	0–0	0–0	0–2	—	0–0	1–0	0–3	1–2	2–3	2–4	0–1	1–2
Khatoco Khanh Hoa	2–2	0–0	0–2	2–1	—	2–0	2–0	1–1	2–0	0–2	4–1	1–1
Long An	0–1	1–0	0–1	1–0	0–0	—	0–0	1–0	1–2	1–2	0–1	1–2
PVF-CAND B	3–3	1–1	1–2	7–0	1–0	2–1	—	1–0	1–1	1–1	2–1	2–2
Quang Ninh	0–0	0–1	3–1	4–2	0–1	1–1	3–1	—	2–1	1–1	1–1	0–0
Quy Nhon United	2–4	3–1	3–1	4–2	1–0	4–1	2–0	1–1	—	1–2	1–1	2–0
Truong Tuoi Dong Nai	0–0	5–1	2–2	6–0	3–1	3–0	2–0	3–0	1–0	—	3–0	4–1
Van Hien University	1–2	1–0	1–1	3–0	3–1	1–0	1–1	1–1	1–1	0–1	—	0–2
Xuan Thien Phu Tho	1–3	0–2	2–0	2–2	1–2	4–0	1–3	3–0	1–4	1–0	2–0	—

Source: VPF
Legend: Blue = home team win; Yellow = draw; Red = away team win.

=== Position by round ===
Team ╲ Round	1	2	3	4	5	6	7	8	9	10	11	12	13	14	15	16	17	18	19	20	21	22
Bac Ninh	10	3	5	4	4	6	5	4	4	3	2	2	2	3	2	2	2	2	2	2	2	2
Dong Thap	8	12	10	10	11	11	11	11	11	11	11	11	10	10	10	10	10	10	10	10	9	10
Ho Chi Minh City FC	3	1	4	3	2	3	3	3	2	4	4	3	3	4	4	4	3	4	3	4	3	3
Ho Chi Minh City Youth	9	9	9	12	12	12	12	12	12	12	12	12	12	12	12	12	12	12	12	12	12	12
Khatoco Khanh Hoa	1	4	2	2	1	1	2	2	3	2	3	5	5	7	6	7	7	8	7	7	7	8
Long An	12	7	8	9	10	10	9	10	10	10	10	10	11	11	11	11	11	11	11	11	11	11
PVF-CAND B	2	5	7	5	7	7	7	7	7	6	8	7	7	6	8	5	5	5	6	6	6	6
Quang Ninh	11	6	3	6	5	5	6	8	8	9	9	9	9	9	9	9	9	9	9	9	10	9
Quy Nhon United	7	10	6	7	6	4	4	5	5	7	5	4	4	2	3	3	4	3	4	3	4	4
Truong Tuoi Dong Nai	4	2	1	1	3	2	1	1	1	1	1	1	1	1	1	1	1	1	1	1	1	1
Van Hien University	5	11	12	8	9	8	8	6	6	5	6	6	6	5	5	6	6	7	8	8	8	7
Xuan Thien Phu Tho	6	8	11	11	8	9	10	9	9	8	7	8	8	8	7	8	8	6	5	5	5	5

Promotion to 2026–27 V.League 1
Qualification for promotion play-offs
Relegation to Vietnamese Second Division

Source: VPF

== Season statistics ==
=== Top scorers ===
Rank	Player	Club	Goals
1	(Brazil) Tháileon	Quy Nhon United	14
2	(Brazil) Alex Sandro	Truong Tuoi Dong Nai	10
2	(Brazil) Bruno Cantanhede	Bac Ninh	10
4	(Vietnam) Nguyễn Hoàng Anh	PVF-CAND B	8
4	(Jamaica) Jermie Lynch	Van Hien University / Ho Chi Minh City FC	8
6	(Vietnam) Lê Thanh Phong	Quy Nhon United	7
6	(Vietnam) Trần Minh Vương	Truong Tuoi Dong Nai	7
6	(Trinidad and Tobago) Shaqkeem Joseph	PVF-CAND B	7
9	(Vietnam) Lương Quốc Thắng	Van Hien University	5
9	(Cameroon) Richmond Nji	Xuan Thien Phu Tho	5
9	(Vietnam) Trần Gia Huy	Xuan Thien Phu Tho	5
9	(Vietnam) Đào Gia Việt	Quy Nhon United	5
9	(Vietnam) Phan Văn Hiếu	Bac Ninh	5
9	(Vietnam) Vũ Xuân Tín	Bac Ninh	5
9	(Brazil) Victor Sales	Ho Chi Minh City Youth	5
9	(Brazil) Romário Alves	Dong Thap	5
9	(Vietnam) Nguyễn Công Thành	Ho Chi Minh City	5

=== Hat-tricks ===
Player	For	Against	Result	Date
(Vietnam) Nguyễn Hoàng Anh	PVF-CAND B	Ho Chi Minh City Youth	7–0 (H)	1 March 2026
(Brazil) Bruno Cantanhede	Bac Ninh	Ho Chi Minh City Youth	8–0 (H)	24 May 2026
(Vietnam) Vũ Xuân Tín	Bac Ninh	Ho Chi Minh City Youth	8–0 (H)	24 May 2026
(Brazil) Bruno Cantanhede	Bac Ninh	Quy Nhon United	4–2 (A)	30 May 2026

=== Clean sheets ===
Rank	Player	Club	Clean sheets
1	(Vietnam) Bùi Tấn Trường	Truong Tuoi Dong Nai	10
2	(Vietnam) Huỳnh Tuấn Linh	Bac Ninh	8
2	(Vietnam) Nguyễn Thanh Thắng	Ho Chi Minh City FC	8
4	(Vietnam) Nguyễn Thanh Tuấn	Văn Hiến University	7
4	(Vietnam) Lê Văn Hưng	Long An	7
6	(Vietnam) Vũ Ngọc Mạnh	Khatoco Khanh Hoa	5
6	(Vietnam) Phan Đình Vũ Hải	Ho Chi Minh City Youth	5
6	(Vietnam) Nguyễn Huỳnh Văn Bin	Dong Thap	5
6	(Vietnam) Nguyễn Tiến Tạo	Xuan Thien Phu Tho	5
10	(Vietnam) Tống Đức An	PVF-CAND B	4
11	(Vietnam) Nguyễn Tiến Mạnh	Dong Thap	3
11	(Vietnam) Dương Văn Cường	Quang Ninh	3
13	(Vietnam) Phạm Hữu Nghĩa	Truong Tuoi Dong Nai	2
13	(Vietnam) Dương Văn Lợi	Quy Nhon United	2
13	(Vietnam) Nguyễn Anh Tuấn	Xuan Thien Phu Tho	2
13	(Vietnam) Võ Văn Sơn	Ho Chi Minh City FC	2
167	(Vietnam) Trần Văn Chiến	Khatoco Khanh Hoa	1
167	(Vietnam) Nguyễn Quang Trường	PVF-CAND B	1
167	(Vietnam) Nguyễn Hoàng Minh Duy	Long An	1
167	(Vietnam) Nguyễn Văn Chức	Quy Nhon United	1
167	(Vietnam) Nguyễn Văn Sơn	Khatoco Khanh Hoa	1
