= 2023–24 Vietnamese Cup =

Tournament details
- Country: Vietnam
- Dates: 24 November 2023 – 7 July 2024
- Teams: 25

Final positions
- Champions: Dong A Thanh Hoa (2nd title)
- Runners-up: Hanoi FC

Tournament statistics
- Matches played: 24
- Goals scored: 76 (3.17 per match)
- Attendance: 95,900 (3,996 per match)
- Top goal scorer(s): Lê Thanh Phong; Lê Văn Thắng; Nguyễn Hai Long; Nguyễn Tiến Linh; Joel Tagueu (3 goals)

The 2023–24 Vietnamese National Cup (Vietnamese: Giải bóng đá Cúp Quốc gia 2023–24), known as the Casper National Cup 2023–24 for sponsorship reasons, was the 32nd edition of the Vietnamese National Football Cup, the premier knockout competition in Vietnamese football. A total of 25 clubs competed in this edition, including all teams from the top two tiers of the Vietnamese football league system. The competition began on 24 November 2023 with the first-round matches, and will be concluded on 7 July 2024 with the final.

V.League 1 team Dong A Thanh Hoa, the defending champion after they won the 2023 Vietnamese Cup, having defeated Viettel FC to win their first National Cup title in the history, retained their title after defeating Hanoi FC in this edition's final.

The winners, Dong A Thanh Hoa, will play the 2024 Vietnamese Super Cup against the 2023–24 V.League 1 winners. In addition, they also earned their spot in 2024–25 AFC Champions League Two group stage.

== Background ==
This is also the first tournament since the 1999–2000 edition to have an inter-year schedule (autumn-to-spring) instead of an intra-year schedule (spring-to-autumn) to follow the schedule changes in the AFC competitions. The tournament consists of 14 teams from V.League 1 and 11 teams from V.League 2 to compete.

Round	Main date	Number of fixtures	Clubs remaining	New entries this round
First Round	24–28 November 2023	9	19 → 10	Binh Thuan withdrew from the tournament, giving Phu Dong Ninh Binh a walkover to the next stage
Round of 16	12–13 March 2024	8	10+6 → 8	6 teams entered directly from the Round of 16 (semifinalists from the previous tournament and the 2 clubs joining 2023–24 AFC Club Competitions)
Quarter-finals	28 April – 1 May 2024	4	8 → 4	
Semi-finals	4 July 2024	2	4 → 2	
Final	7 July 2024	1	2 → 1	

== Matches ==
=== Qualifying round ===
24 November 2023	Phu Tho (2)	2–5	Long An (2)	Việt Trì Stadium, Phú Thọ
16:00 UTC+7	Bùi Huy Hoàng 65'; Đinh Viết Lộc 71'	Report	Lê Thanh Phong 8', 45+1', 62'; Cù Nguyễn Khánh 22'; Lê Hoàng Dương 90'	Attendance: 200; Referee: Nguyễn Hữu Tuấn

24 November 2023	Dong Nai (2)	2–0	Ba Ria-Vung Tau (2)	Đồng Nai Stadium, Đồng Nai
17:00 UTC+7	Nguyễn Hoàng Huy 10'; Bùi Ngọc Thịnh 81'	Report		Attendance: 500; Referee: Nguyễn Văn Chôm

24 November 2023	Quang Nam (1)	4–1	Hoa Binh (2)	Hòa Xuân Stadium, Đà Nẵng
--:-- UTC+7	Nguyễn Tăng Tiến 59', 64'; Nguyễn Đình Bắc 82'; Hoàng Vũ Samson 90'	Report	Nguyễn Anh Tú 33'	Attendance: 300; Referee: Đặng Quốc Dũng

25 November 2023	SHB Da Nang (2)	2–0	Hue (2)	Hòa Xuân Stadium, Đà Nẵng
17:00 UTC+7	Nguyễn Phi Hoàng 25'; Nguyễn Minh Quang 75'	Report		Attendance: 1,000; Referee: Lê Ngọc Lợi

25 November 2023	Cong An Hanoi (1)	2–1	LPBank Hoang Anh Gia Lai (1)	Hàng Đẫy Stadium, Hà Nội
19:15 UTC+7	Hồ Ngọc Thắng 36'; Jeferson Elias 74'	Report	Châu Ngọc Quang 14'	Attendance: 8,000; Referee: Hoàng Thanh Bình

26 November 2023	Song Lam Nghe An (1)	6–2	Dong Thap (2)	Vinh Stadium, Nghệ An
17:00 UTC+7	Đinh Xuân Tiến 13', 38'; Trần Mạnh Quỳnh 15', 18'; Phạm Hoàng Lâm 34' (o.g.); Nguyễn Quang Vinh 85'	Report	Nguyễn Công Thành 63'; Trần Văn Đạt 70'	Attendance: 4,000; Referee: Trần Ngọc Ánh

26 November 2023	Truong Tuoi Binh Phuoc (2)	0–4	Thep Xanh Nam Dinh (1)	Bình Phước Stadium, Bình Phước
18:00 UTC+7		Report	Trần Văn Đạt 38'; Nguyễn Văn Toàn 47'; Nguyễn Văn Vĩ 83'; Hoàng Minh Tuấn 90+2'	Attendance: 5,000; Referee: Nguyễn Ngọc Thắng

26 November 2023	Khanh Hoa (1)	2–2 (3–4 p)	Hong Linh Ha Tinh (1)	19/8 Stadium, Khánh Hòa
18:00 UTC+7	Mamadou Guirassy 49', 85'	Report	Stephen Gopey 31', 90+3'	Attendance: 5,000; Referee: Trần Văn Trọng
	Penalties
	Mamadou Guirassy (penalty missed); Alie Sesay (penalty scored); Nguyễn Đình Mạnh (penalty scored); Nguyễn Duy Dương (penalty scored); Watz Leazard (penalty missed)		(penalty scored) Nguyễn Trung Học; (penalty scored) Trần Đình Tiến; (penalty missed) Phạm Văn Long; (penalty scored) Bruno Ramires; (penalty scored) Lâm Anh Quang

28 November 2023	Ho Chi Minh City (1)	1–2	Becamex Binh Duong (1)	Thống Nhất Stadium, Hồ Chí Minh City
19:15 UTC+7	Cheick Timité 77'	Report	Nguyễn Tiến Linh 52'; Nguyễn Trần Việt Cường 61'	Attendance: 5,000; Referee: Ngô Duy Lân

Phu Dong Ninh Binh (2)	Cancelled	Binh Thuan (2)
Note: Phu Dong Ninh Binh automatically qualified to the next stage as Binh Thuan withdrew from the Vietnamese professional football system.

=== Round of 16 ===
12 March 2024	PVF-CAND (2)	2–1	Dong Nai (2)	PVF Stadium, Hưng Yên
18:00 UTC+7	Trần Đức Nam 19'; Nguyễn Xuân Nam 45+2'	Report	Vũ Bá Hải Dương 21'	Attendance: 500; Referee: Vũ Phúc Hoan

12 March 2024	Dong A Thanh Hoa (1)	3–0	Phu Dong Ninh Binh (2)	Thanh Hóa Stadium, Thanh Hóa
18:00 UTC+7	Lê Văn Thắng 27', 45', 52'	Report		Attendance: 4,000; Referee: Trần Thế Anh

12 March 2024	Haiphong (1)	2–1	Quang Nam (1)	Lạch Tray Stadium, Hải Phòng
18:00 UTC+7	Bicou Bissainthe 17'; Lucão 19'	Report	Ngân Văn Đại 48'	Attendance: 6,200; Referee: Trần Ngọc Ánh

12 March 2024	Hanoi FC (1)	2–1	Hong Linh Ha Tinh (1)	Hàng Đẫy Stadium, Hà Nội
19:15 UTC+7	Joel Tagueu 18'; Denílson 39'	Report	Vũ Viết Triều 85'	Attendance: 3,500; Referee: Lê Đức Cảnh

13 March 2024	Long An (2)	1–3	Becamex Binh Duong (1)	Long An Stadium, Long An
17:00 UTC+7	Trần Văn Anh Vũ 82'	Report	Bùi Vĩ Hào 45+2'; Nguyễn Tiến Linh 80'; Nguyễn Hải Huy 90'	Attendance: 1,000; Referee: Trần Văn Trọng

13 March 2024	Song Lam Nghe An (1)	0–1	SHB Da Nang (2)	Vinh Stadium, Nghệ An
18:00 UTC+7		Report	Nguyễn Minh Quang 65'	Attendance: 2,500; Referee: Trương Hồng Vũ

13 March 2024	MerryLand Quy Nhon Binh Dinh (1)	0–1	Thep Xanh Nam Dinh (1)	Quy Nhơn Stadium, Bình Định
18:00 UTC+7		Report	Hêndrio 43'	Attendance: 3.000; Referee: Khổng Tam Cường

13 March 2024	The Cong-Viettel (1)	1–0	Cong An Hanoi (1)	Hàng Đẫy Stadium, Hà Nội
19:15 UTC+7	Pedro Henrique 63'	Report		Attendance: 5,000; Referee: Nguyễn Mạnh Hải

=== Quarter-final ===
28 April 2024	Hanoi FC (1)	2–1	SHB Da Nang (2)	Hàng Đẫy Stadium, Hà Nội
19:15 UTC+7	Nguyễn Hai Long 36', 56'	Report	Liễu Quang Vinh 77'	Attendance: 1,200; Referee: Nguyễn Văn Phúc

29 April 2024	Dong A Thanh Hoa (1)	1–1 (4–2 p)	Haiphong (1)	Thanh Hóa Stadium, Thanh Hóa
18:00 UTC+7	Đặng Văn Tới 18' (o.g.)	Report	Lương Hoàng Nam 28'	Attendance: 3,000; Referee: Trần Ngọc Ánh
	Penalties
	Rimario Gordon (penalty missed); Hoàng Đình Tùng (penalty scored); Lâm Ti Phông (penalty scored); Phạm Trùm Tỉnh (penalty scored); Luiz Antônio (penalty scored)		(penalty scored) Lucão do Break; (penalty missed) Nguyễn Hữu Sơn; (penalty scored) Lê Mạnh Dũng; (penalty missed) Đàm Tiến Dũng

30 April 2024	Thep Xanh Nam Dinh (1)	1–1 (4–3 p)	Becamex Binh Duong (1)	Thiên Trường Stadium, Nam Định
18:00 UTC+7	Rafaelson 10' (pen.)	Report	Nguyễn Tiến Linh 49'	Attendance: 8,000; Referee: Nguyễn Ngọc Tùng
	Penalties
	Rafaelson (penalty missed); Lucas Alves (penalty scored); Hêndrio (penalty scored); Tô Văn Vũ (penalty scored); Đỗ Thanh Thịnh (penalty scored)		(penalty missed) Janclesio; (penalty scored) Charles Atshimene; (penalty missed) Bùi Vĩ Hào; (penalty scored) Nguyễn Tiến Linh; (penalty scored) Quế Ngọc Hải

1 May 2024	The Cong-Viettel (1)	2–2 (5–3 p)	PVF-CAND (2)	Hàng Đẫy Stadium, Hà Nội
19:15 UTC+7	Nguyễn Hữu Thắng 15'; Trương Tiến Anh 82'	Report	Nguyễn Thanh Nhàn 55'; Nguyễn Hiểu Minh 83'	Attendance: 2,500; Referee: Lê Đức Cảnh
	Penalties
	Nguyễn Hoàng Đức (penalty scored); Khuất Văn Khang (penalty scored); Bùi Tiến Dũng (penalty scored); Trương Tiến Anh (penalty scored); Trần Mạnh Cường (penalty scored)		(penalty scored) Nguyễn Thanh Nhàn; (penalty scored) Nguyễn Hiểu Minh; (penalty scored) Nguyễn Bảo Long; (penalty missed) Nguyễn Hữu Nam

=== Semi-final ===
4 July 2024	The Cong-Viettel (1)	1–4	Hanoi FC (1)	Hàng Đẫy Stadium, Hà Nội
18:00 UTC+7	Nguyễn Hữu Thắng 52'	Report	Nguyễn Văn Quyết 14'; Nguyễn Hai Long 64'; Joel Tagueu 86', 90+7'	Attendance: 5,000; Referee: Nguyễn Viết Duẩn

4 July 2024	Dong A Thanh Hoa (1)	2–1	Thep Xanh Nam Dinh (1)	Thanh Hóa Stadium, Thanh Hóa
18:00 UTC+7	A Mít 24'; Rimario Gordon 62'	Report	Hêndrio 16'	Attendance: 8,000; Referee: Lê Vũ Linh

=== Final ===
7 July 2024	Dong A Thanh Hoa (1)	0–0 (9–8 p)	Hanoi FC (1)	Thanh Hóa Stadium, Thanh Hóa
18:00 UTC+7		Report		Attendance: 13,500; Referee: (Malaysia) Muhammad Jamal
	Penalties
	Luiz Antônio (penalty scored); Hoàng Đình Tùng (penalty scored); Lê Thanh Bình (penalty missed); Lâm Ti Phông (penalty scored); Đinh Viết Tú (penalty scored); Đinh Tiến Thành (penalty scored); Nguyễn Thanh Long (penalty scored); Trương Thanh Nam (penalty scored); Nguyễn Thái Sơn (penalty scored); Hoàng Thái Bình (penalty scored)		(penalty scored) Đậu Văn Toàn; (penalty scored) Đỗ Hùng Dũng; (penalty scored) Nguyễn Văn Tùng; (penalty scored) Nguyễn Hai Long; (penalty missed) Joel Tagueu; (penalty scored) Phạm Xuân Mạnh; (penalty scored) Vũ Đình Hai; (penalty scored) Nguyễn Thành Chung; (penalty scored) Đỗ Duy Mạnh; (penalty missed) Nguyễn Văn Quyết

== Bracket ==
First round
26 November 2023; 19/8 Stadium
Khanh Hoa FC (2)	2 (3)
Hong Linh Ha Tinh (3)	2 (4)
26 November 2023; Vinh Stadium
Song Lam Nghe An (4)	6
Dong Thap (5)	2
25 November 2023; Hòa Xuân Stadium
SHB Da Nang (6)	2
Hue (7)	0
25 November 2023; Hàng Đẫy Stadium
Cong An Hanoi (9)	2
LPBank Hoang Anh Gia Lai (10)	1
24 November 2023; Đồng Nai Stadium
Dong Nai (12)	2
Ba Ria-Vung Tau (13)	0
25 November 2023; Bình Phước Stadium
Truong Tuoi Binh Phuoc (15)	0
Thep Xanh Nam Dinh (16)	4
24 November 2023; Việt Trì Stadium
Phu Tho (17)	2
Long An (18)	5
28 November 2023; Thống Nhất Stadium
Ho Chi Minh City FC (19)	1
Becamex Binh Duong (20)	2
Phu Dong Ninh Binh (22)	w/o
Binh Thuan (23)
24 November 2023; Hòa Xuân Stadium
Quang Nam (25)	4
Hoa Binh (26)	1

Round of 16
12 March 2024; Hàng Đẫy Stadium
Hanoi FC (1)	2
Hong Linh Ha Tinh (3)	1
13 March 2024; Vinh Stadium
Song Lam Nghe An (4)	0
SHB Da Nang (6)	1
13 March 2024; Hàng Đẫy Stadium
The Cong-Viettel (8)	1
Cong An Hanoi (9)	0
12 March 2024; PVF Stadium
PVF-CAND (11)	2
Dong Nai (12)	1
13 March 2024; Quy Nhơn Stadium
Quy Nhon Binh Dinh (14)	0
Thep Xanh Nam Dinh (16)	1
13 March 2024; Long An Stadium
Long An (18)	1
Becamex Binh Duong (20)	3
12 March 2024; Thanh Hóa Stadium
Dong A Thanh Hoa (21)	3
Phu Dong Ninh Binh (22)	0
12 March 2024; Lạch Tray Stadium
Haiphong (24)	2
Quang Nam (25)	1

Quarter-Finals
28 April 2024; Hàng Đẫy Stadium
Hanoi FC (1)	2
SHB Da Nang (6)	1
1 May 2024; Hàng Đẫy Stadium
The Cong-Viettel (8)	2 (5)
PVF-CAND (11)	2 (3)
30 April 2024; Thiên Trường Stadium
Thep Xanh Nam Dinh (16)	1 (4)
Becamex Binh Duong (20)	1 (3)
29 April 2024; Thanh Hóa Stadium
Dong A Thanh Hoa (21)	1 (4)
Haiphong (24)	1 (2)

Semi-Finals
4 July 2024; Hàng Đẫy Stadium
Hanoi FC (1)	4
The Cong-Viettel (8)	1
4 July 2024; Thanh Hóa Stadium
Thep Xanh Nam Dinh (16)	1
Dong A Thanh Hoa (21)	2

Final
7 July 2024; Thanh Hóa Stadium
Hanoi FC (1)	0 (8)
Dong A Thanh Hoa (21)	0 (9)
