= 2025 Vietnamese Football League Second Division =

25th season of the 3rd division of association football in Vietnam

Vietnamese Football League Second Division
- Season: 2025
- Dates: 11 April – 22 June 2025
- Champions: Quang Ninh; Van Hien University
- Promoted: Bac Ninh; Gia Dinh; PVF-CAND B Quang Ninh; Van Hien University
- Relegated: Phu Tho
- Matches: 79
- Goals: 192 (2.43 per match)
- Biggest home win: SHB Da Nang B 5–0 Gia Dinh
- Biggest away win: PVF 3–4 Quang Ninh
- Highest scoring: PVF 3–4 Quang Ninh
- Longest winning run: 9 games Quang Ninh
- Longest unbeaten run: 10 games Quang Ninh
- Longest winless run: 8 games Hoai Duc
- Longest losing run: 9 games Hoai Duc

The 2025 Vietnamese Second Division was the 26th season of the Vietnamese Football League Second Division. The season began on 11 April and ended on 13 May for the first leg, and 21 May to 22 June for the second leg. The 4 best teams on 2 groups will promote to 2025–26 V.League 2.

== Team changes ==
Promoted from 2024 Third Division	Relegated from 2023–24 V.League 2	Promoted to 2024–25 V.League 2	Relegated to 2025 Third Division	Withdrawn
Gia Dinh; Hoai Duc; PVF-CAND B Quang Ninh; Tay Ninh	Phu Tho	LPBank Ho Chi Minh City; ~~Dinh Huong Phu Nhuan~~	An Giang; Tay Nguyen Gia Lai	~~Tien Giang~~

After promoting to the V.League 2, Dinh Huong Phu Nhuan had folded due to financial difficulties.

Tien Giang withdrew from the 2025 Vietnamese Second Division due to financial difficulties, thus reduced the participating teams from 16 to 15.

== Teams ==
Locations of the 2025 Vietnamese Second Division teams

Team	Location	Stadium	Capacity
Bac Ninh FC	Bắc Ninh	Từ Sơn City Stadium	5,000
Dak Lak FC	Đắk Lắk	Buôn Ma Thuật Stadium	20,000
Gia Dinh	Hồ Chí Minh City	Tân Hiệp Stadium	1,000
Van Hien University	Hồ Chí Minh City	Thống Nhất Stadium	15,000
Hanoi FC B	Hà Nội	Thanh Trì Stadium	4,000
Hoai Duc	Hà Nội	Hoài Đức Stadium	3,500
Kon Tum FC	Kon Tum	Kon Tum Stadium	11,000
Lam Dong FC	Lâm Đồng	Đà Lạt Stadium	20,000
Phu Tho FC	Phú Thọ	Việt Trì Stadium	20,000
PVF	Hưng Yên	PVF Stadium	3,600
PVF-CAND B	Hưng Yên	PVF Stadium	3,600
Quang Ninh FC	Quảng Ninh	Cẩm Phả Stadium	20,000
SHB Da Nang B	Đà Nẵng	Quân Khu 5 Stadium	12,000
SHB Da Nang B	Đà Nẵng	Chi Lăng Stadium	30,000
Tay Ninh FC	Tây Ninh	Tây Ninh Province Sports Training and Competition Center	1,000
Vinh Long FC	Vĩnh Long	Vĩnh Long Stadium	10,000

=== Personnel and kits ===
Note: Flags indicate national team as has been defined under FIFA eligibility rules. Players may hold more than one non-FIFA nationality.

Team	Manager	Kit manufacturer	Shirt sponsor
Bac Ninh	(Vietnam) Phạm Hùng Vương	(Vietnam) Kamito	
Dak Lak	(Vietnam) Trần Phi Ái	(Vietnam) Demenino Sport	
Gia Dinh	(Vietnam) Hoàng Nhật Nam	(Thailand) Grand Sport	
Hanoi FC B	(Vietnam) Phạm Minh Đức	(Japan) Jogarbola	(Vietnam) T&T Utech
Hoai Duc	(Vietnam) Trương Mạnh Hà	(Vietnam) RIKI Sport	
Kon Tum	(Vietnam) Đinh Văn Dũng	(Vietnam) CA Sports	(Vietnam) Café de Măng Đen
Lam Dong	(Vietnam) Đoàn Quốc Việt	(Vietnam) Kamito	
Phu Tho	(Vietnam) Đặng Công Thành	(Vietnam) Wika	
PVF	(Vietnam) Nguyễn Duy Đông	(Japan) Jogarbola	
PVF-CAND B	(Vietnam) Nguyễn Anh Tuấn	(England) Mitre	
Quang Ninh	(Vietnam) Nguyễn Văn Đàn	(Spain) Kelme	
SHB Da Nang B	(Vietnam) Đoàn Hùng Sơn	(Vietnam) Wika	(Vietnam) SHB
Tay Ninh	(Vietnam) Hồ Thanh Hào	(Vietnam) Kamito	(Vietnam) Tuấn Sports
Van Hien University	(Vietnam) Hoàng Hải Dương	Made by club	(Vietnam) Văn Hiến University
Vinh Long	(Vietnam) Nguyễn Minh Cảnh	(Thailand) Grand Sport	

== Standings ==
15 teams compete in the 2025 season, split into two groups based on geographical proximity. The best two teams of each group will promote to the V.League 2. In cases one or more teams are either ineligible or decline to participate in the V.League 2, VFF will select best team(s) among both groups to be promoted. If this happens, among Top 6 teams of Group B, the results against the bottom 2 teams of the group will not be counted due to the difference in the number of teams between both groups.

=== Group A ===
==== Table ====
Pos	Team	Pld	W	D	L	GF	GA	GD	Pts	Promotion or relegation
1	Quang Ninh (P)	10	8	2	0	20	6	+14	26	Promotion to V.League 2
2	Bac Ninh (P)	10	8	1	1	25	4	+21	25	Promotion to V.League 2
3	PVF-CAND B (Note: Following PVF-CAND's promotion to the 2025–26 V.League 1, to replace withdrawn Quang Nam, PVF-CAND B was chosen to promote to the 2025–26 V.League 2.) (P)	10	6	0	4	15	11	+4	18	Promotion to V.League 2
4	PVF	10	2	2	6	11	15	−4	8	
5	Hanoi FC B	10	2	1	7	7	17	−10	7	
6	Hoai Duc	10	1	0	9	4	29	−25	3	
7	Phu Tho	0	0	0	0	0	0	0	0 (Note: On 3 May 2025, Phu Tho was expelled from the league and was automatically relegated to the Third Division due to match fixing. As the result, all their previous results were cancelled.)	Disqualification and demotion to Third Division

Source: VFF
Rules for classification: 1) Points; 2) Head-to-head record; 3) Goal difference; 4) Number of goals scored; 5) Number of away goals scored; 6) Disciplinary points
(Rules 3–5 only apply after home and away matches have been played between the tied teams.)
(P) Promoted

==== Results ====
Home \ Away	BNI	HAN	HDU	PVF	PCA	QNI
Bac Ninh	—	3–1	4–1	2–0	3–0	0–0
Hanoi FC B	0–2	—	4–0	0–3	0–1	0–2
Hoai Duc	0–4	1–2	—	0–2	0–3	0–3
PVF	1–4	0–0	1–2	—	0–1	3–4
PVF-CAND B	0–3	4–0	3–0	1–0	—	0–1
Quang Ninh	1–0	1–0	3–0	1–1	4–2	—

Updated to match(es) played on 22 June 2025. Source: VFF (1st leg), VFF (2nd leg)
Legend: Blue = home team win; Yellow = draw; Red = away team win.

=== Group B ===
==== Table ====
Pos	Team	Pld	W	D	L	GF	GA	GD	Pts	Promotion
1	Van Hien University (P)	14	8	5	1	14	8	+6	29 (Note: Head-to-head points: Van Hien University: 7; Gia Dinh: 5, Lam Dong: 4.)	Promotion to V.League 2
2	Gia Dinh (P)	14	9	2	3	25	15	+10	29	Promotion to V.League 2
3	Lam Dong	14	9	2	3	22	12	+10	29	
4	SHB Da Nang B	14	5	5	4	16	13	+3	20	
5	Dak Lak	14	4	2	8	9	15	−6	14	
6	Kon Tum	14	4	2	8	15	22	−7	14	
7	Vinh Long	14	3	2	9	14	21	−7	11	
8	Tay Ninh	14	3	2	9	16	25	−9	11	

Source: VFF
Rules for classification: 1) Points; 2) Head-to-head record; 3) Goal difference; 4) Number of goals scored; 5) Number of away goals scored; 6) Disciplinary points
(Rules 3–5 only apply after home and away matches have been played between the tied teams.)
(P) Promoted

==== Results ====
Home \ Away	DLA	GDI	KTU	LDO	SDN	TNI	VHU	VLO
Dak Lak	—	0–1	0–1	1–2	0–0	1–0	0–0	1–0
Gia Dinh	3–0	—	3–1	2–0	1–2	2–1	0–0	2–0
Kon Tum	1–3	1–2	—	0–2	0–0	1–0	0–1	1–2
Lam Dong	2–0	1–1	1–2	—	2–1	2–1	3–0	3–1
SHB Da Nang B	1–0	5–0	0–2	1–1	—	0–2	0–1	1–0
Tay Ninh	2–1	1–4	3–1	1–2	2–2	—	0–2	2–2
Van Hien University	1–0	2–1	2–2	1–0	1–1	2–1	—	1–0
Vinh Long	1–2	1–3	3–2	0–1	1–2	3–0	0–0	—

Source: VFF (1st leg), VFF (2nd leg)
Legend: Blue = home team win; Yellow = draw; Red = away team win.
