= Nguyễn Thanh Thắng =

Vietnamese footballer

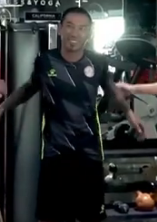
- Thanh Thắng in 2022

Personal information
- Full name: Nguyễn Thanh Thắng
- Date of birth: 24 December 1988 (age 37)
- Place of birth: Trảng Bom, Đồng Nai, Vietnam
- Height: 1.72 m (5 ft 8 in)
- Position: Goalkeeper

Team information
- Current team: Hồ Chí Minh City
- Number: 1

Youth career
- 2008–2011: Đồng Nai

Senior career*
Years	Team	Apps	(Gls)
2011	Đồng Nai	0	(0)
2011	Đồng Tháp	6	(0)
2012	Tây Ninh	2	(0)
2012–2013	Kiên Giang	33	(0)
2014–2015	Hải Phòng	42	(0)
2016–2018	FLC Thanh Hóa	52	(0)
2019–2023	Hồ Chí Minh City	60	(0)
2024–2025	Đông Á Thanh Hóa	9	(0)
2025–	Hồ Chí Minh City	22	(0)
- * Club domestic league appearances and goals as of 24 October 2026

Nguyễn Thanh Thắng (born 24 December 1988) is a Vietnamese professional footballer who plays as a goalkeeper for V.League 2 club Hồ Chí Minh City.

== Honours ==
Hải Phòng

- Vietnamese National Cup: 2014
- Vietnamese Super Cup: Runner-up: 2015

Thanh Hóa

- V.League 1: Runner-up: 2017, 2018
- Vietnamese National Cup: 2023–24; Runner-up: 2018

Hồ Chí Minh City

- V.League 1: Runner-up: 2020
- Vietnamese Super Cup: Runner-up: 2020
