= Long Thanh =

Long Thanh may refer to several places in Vietnam, including:

== Long Thành ==
- Long Thành, Đồng Nai: a commune in the former Long Thành district, previously a township and district capital
- Long Thành, Vĩnh Long: a commune in the former Duyên Hải district, previously a township
- Long Thành district: a former district, dissolved in 2025 as part of the 2025 Vietnamese administrative reform
- Long Thanh International Airport: an airport in Đồng Nai, serving the Ho Chi Minh City metropolitan area

== Long Thạnh ==
- Long Thạnh: a commune of An Giang province

== See also ==
- Thanh Long (disambiguation)
