= 2018 Vietnamese Cup =

Tournament details
- Country: Vietnam
- Teams: 24

Final positions
- Champions: Becamex Bình Dương (3rd title)
- Runners-up: FLC Thanh Hóa

Tournament statistics
- Matches played: 28
- Goals scored: 80 (2.86 per match)
- Top goal scorer(s): Nguyễn Công Phượng; Hồ Tuấn Tài; Rimario Gordon (4 goals each)

The 2018 National Cup (Vietnamese: Giải bóng đá Cúp Quốc gia) is the 26th edition of the Vietnamese National Cup, the football knockout competition of Vietnam organized by the Vietnam Football Federation.

The schedule of the tournament was announced on 28 March 2018.

== Qualifying round ==
8 April 2018	Bình Định (2)	1 – 0	Viettel (2)	Quy Nhơn Stadium
	Lê Vũ Quốc Nhật 2'			Attendance: 10.000; Referee: Đỗ Văn Hiếu

8 April 2018	Long An (2)	1 – 1 (11 – 10 p)	Công An Nhân Dân (2)	Long An Stadium
	Nguyễn Tuấn Anh 8'		Vũ Mạnh Duy 40'	Attendance: 500; Referee: Nguyễn Văn Tạo

8 April 2018	Fico Tây Ninh (2)	0 – 1	Bình Phước (2)	Tây Ninh Stadium
			Lâm Thuận 28'	Attendance: 1.000; Referee: Nguyễn Đình Tiến Dũng

9 April 2018	Hoàng Anh Gia Lai (1)	5 – 0	Than Quảng Ninh (1)	Pleiku Stadium
	Nguyễn Văn Toàn 10'; Lương Xuân Trường 36' (pen.); Rimario Gordon 46', 70'; Nguyễn Công Phượng 87'			Attendance: 6.000; Referee: Nguyễn Minh Thuận

9 April 2018	Huế (2)	1 – 2	Sanna Khánh Hòa (1)	Tự Do Stadium
	Võ Lý 84'		Trần Văn Tùng 64'; Phạm Trùm Tỉnh 90+3'	Attendance: 1.600; Referee: Lê Lưu Quang

9 April 2018	Hà Nội (1)	0 – 0 (4 - 2 p)	Đắk Lắk (2)	Hàng Đẫy Stadium
				Attendance: 3.000; Referee: Ngô Mạnh Cường

9 April 2018	Tp Hồ Chí Minh (1)	1 – 0	Đồng Tháp (2)	Thống Nhất Stadium
	Vũ Ngọc Thịnh 22'			Attendance: Khổng Tam Cường; Referee: 1.000

== Round of 16 ==
28 April 2018	Quảng Nam (1)	2 – 3	Hoàng Anh Gia Lai (1)	Tam Kỳ Stadium
	Hà Minh Tuấn 51', 55'		Nguyễn Công Phượng 39', 90+2' (pen.); Lương Xuân Trường 71' (pen.)	Attendance: 10,000; Referee: Tăng Hoàng Tuấn

28 April 2018	Hà Nội (1)	5 – 0	Sài Gòn (1)	Hàng Đẫy Stadium
	Hoàng Vũ Samson 45+1', 79'; Ganiyu Oseni 58', 60'; Đỗ Hùng Dũng 70'			Attendance: 4,000; Referee: Nguyễn Viết Duẩn

28 April 2018	Sanna Khánh Hòa (1)	2 – 1	Hải Phòng (1)	Nha Trang Stadium
	Trần Văn Vũ 15' (pen.); Nguyễn Hoàng Quốc Chí 60'		Nguyễn Vũ Hoàng Dương 8'	Attendance: 3,000; Referee: Vũ Nguyên Vũ

28 April 2018	Becamex Bình Dương (1)	2 – 0	Bình Định (2)	Gò Đậu Stadium
	Nguyễn Anh Đức 17'; Trịnh Duy Long 40'			Attendance: 1,000; Referee: Nguyễn Văn Chôm

29 April 2018	Bình Phước (2)	2 – 0	Nam Định (1)	Bình Phước Stadium
	Cao Minh Tạo 84'; Đặng Trần Hoàng Nhựt 90+3' (pen.)			Attendance: 1,500; Referee: Đỗ Thành Đệ

29 April 2018	FLC Thanh Hóa (1)	2 – 0	Long An (2)	Thanh Hóa Stadium
	Nguyễn Trọng Hoàng 83'; Hoàng Đình Tùng 87'			Attendance: 2,500; Referee: Nguyễn Phương Nam

29 April 2018	SHB Đà Nẵng (1)	4 – 2	XSKT Cần Thơ (1)	Hòa Xuân Stadium
	Nguyễn Thanh Hải 15'; Hà Đức Chinh 28'; Diogo Pereira 87'; Đỗ Merlo 89'		Wander Luiz 27', 69'	Attendance: 5,000; Referee: Trần Trung Hiếu

29 April 2018	Sông Lam Nghệ An (1)	2 – 0	Tp Hồ Chí Minh (1)	Vinh Stadium
	Hồ Tuấn Tài 22'; Phạm Xuân Mạnh 84'			Attendance: 4,000; Referee: Nguyễn Trung Kiên

== Quarter-finals ==
=== 1st Legs ===
11 May 2018	Hoàng Anh Gia Lai (1)	2 – 2	Hà Nội (1)	Pleiku Stadium
19:00	Đỗ Duy Mạnh 57' (o.g.); Nguyễn Công Phượng 82' (pen.)		Ganiyu Oseni 45+2'; Nguyễn Quang Hải 71'	Attendance: 9,000; Referee: Ngô Duy Lân

11 May 2018	Sanna Khánh Hòa (1)	0 – 1	Becamex Bình Dương (1)	Nha Trang Stadium
18:00			Đinh Hoàng Max 40'	Attendance: 5,000; Referee: Nguyễn Hiền Triết

11 May 2018	SHB Đà Nẵng (1)	1 – 3	Sông Lam Nghệ An (1)	Hòa Xuân Stadium
17:00	Đỗ Merlo 83'		Hồ Tuấn Tài 47', 50'; Phan Văn Đức 66'	Attendance: 7,000; Referee: Nguyễn Quốc Hùng

11 May 2018	FLC Thanh Hóa (1)	2 – 0	Bình Phước (2)	Thanh Hóa Stadium
17:00	Hoàng Đình Tùng 9'; Mai Tiến Thành 50'			Attendance: 4,000; Referee: Nguyễn Đình Thái

=== 2nd Legs ===
15 May 2018	Hà Nội (1)	1 – 1	Hoàng Anh Gia Lai (1)	Hàng Đẫy Stadium
19:00	Nguyễn Thành Chung 81'		Nguyễn Văn Toàn 41'	Attendance: 15,000; Referee: Nguyễn Hiền Triết

3-3 on aggregate. Hà Nội won on away goals.

15 May 2018	Becamex Bình Dương (1)	3 – 1	Sanna Khánh Hòa (1)	Gò Đậu Stadium
17:00	Nguyễn Anh Đức 24'; Romario Kortzorg 64'; Hồ Sỹ Giáp 78'		Hoàng Nhật Nam 89' (pen.)	Attendance: 2,000; Referee: Nguyễn Minh Thuận

Becamex Bình Dương won 4-1 on aggregate.

15 May 2018	Sông Lam Nghệ An (1)	2 – 0	SHB Đà Nẵng (1)	Vinh Stadium
17:00	Phan Văn Đức 14'; Hồ Tuấn Tài 90+3'			Attendance: 5,000; Referee: Trần Đình Thịnh

Sông Lam Nghệ An won 5-1 on aggregate.

15 May 2018	Bình Phước (2)	1 – 1	FLC Thanh Hóa (1)	Bình Phước Stadium
16:30	Trương Văn Tuấn 76'		Vũ Minh Tuấn 42'	Attendance: 5,000; Referee: Nguyễn Ngọc Châu

FLC Thanh Hóa won 3-1 on aggregate.

== Semi-finals ==
=== First leg ===
25 July 2018	Hà Nội (1)	3–3	Becamex Bình Dương (1)	Hàng Đẫy Stadium
19:00	Hoàng Vũ Samson 36'; Đỗ Hùng Dũng; Oloya		Đinh Hoàng Max 28'; Tô Văn Vũ 38', 53'	Attendance: 3,500; Referee: Nguyễn Hiền Triết

25 July 2018	FLC Thanh Hóa (1)	2–3	Sông Lam Nghệ An (1)	Thanh Hóa Stadium
17:00	Faye 12'; Gordon 37'		Lynch 18', 87'; Olaha 22'	Attendance: 4,500; Referee: Trương Hồng Vũ

=== Second leg ===
11 October 2018	Becamex Bình Dương (1)	0–0	Hà Nội (1)	Gò Đậu Stadium
17:00				Attendance: 8,000; Referee: Trương Hồng Vũ

3-3 on aggregate. Becamex Bình Dương won on away goals.

5 September 2018	Sông Lam Nghệ An (1)	0–4	FLC Thanh Hóa (1)	Vinh Stadium
17:00			Nguyễn Minh Tùng 15'; Pape Omar Faye 65'; Nguyễn Trọng Hoàng 68'; Rimario Gordon 65'	Attendance: 12,000; Referee: Ngô Duy Lân

FLC Thanh Hóa won 6–3 on aggregate

== Final ==
The final was played on 15 October.

15 October 2018
17:00

Becamex Bình Dương (1)	3–1	FLC Thanh Hóa (1)
Tô Văn Vũ 16', 61'; Hồ Sỹ Giáp 37'		Pape Omar Faye 44'

Tam Kỳ Stadium
Attendance: 4,000
Referee: Hoàng Anh Tuấn

== Top scorers ==
As of 6 September 2018

Rank	Player	Club	Goals
1	(Vietnam) Nguyễn Công Phượng	Hoàng Anh Gia Lai	4
1	(Vietnam) Hồ Tuấn Tài	Sông Lam Nghệ An	4
1	(Jamaica) Rimario Gordon	Hoàng Anh Gia Lai/FLC Thanh Hóa	4
4	(Nigeria) Ganiyu Oseni	Hà Nội	3
4	(Vietnam) Hoàng Vũ Samson	Hà Nội	3
6	(Vietnam) Đỗ Hùng Dũng	Hà Nội	2
6	(Vietnam) Lương Xuân Trường	Hoàng Anh Gia Lai	2
6	(Vietnam) Nguyễn Văn Toàn	Hoàng Anh Gia Lai	2
6	(Vietnam) Hà Minh Tuấn	Quảng Nam	2
6	(Brazil) Wander Luiz	XSKT Cần Thơ	2
6	(Vietnam) Hoàng Đình Tùng	FLC Thanh Hóa	2
6	(Vietnam) Nguyễn Trọng Hoàng	FLC Thanh Hóa	2
6	(Senegal) Pape Omar Faye	FLC Thanh Hóa	2
6	(Vietnam) Đỗ Merlo	SHB Đà Nẵng	2
6	(Vietnam) Nguyễn Anh Đức	Becamex Bình Dương	2
6	(Vietnam) Đinh Hoàng Max	Becamex Bình Dương	2
6	(Vietnam) Tô Văn Vũ	Becamex Bình Dương	2
6	(Vietnam) Phan Văn Đức	Sông Lam Nghệ An	2
6	(Jamaica) Jeremie Lynch	Sông Lam Nghệ An	2
