= Thanh Long =

Thanh Long (Vietnamese, 'dragon fruit') may refer to:

== Places ==
- Thanh Long, Cao Bằng, a commune in Vietnam
- Thành Long, an administrative division of Hàm Yên district, Tuyên Quang province, Vietnam
- Thành Long, a commune in Châu Thành district, Tây Ninh, Vietnam

== People ==
- Nguyễn Thanh Long (born 1966), Vietnamese politician and doctor
- Nguyễn Thanh Long (footballer) (born 1993), Vietnamese footballer
- Lê Phạm Thành Long (born 1996), Vietnamese footballer

== Other uses ==
- Thanh Long, Vietnamese designation of the Azure Dragon dragon gods
- Thành Long Stadium, Hồ Chí Minh City, Vietnam, home of Hồ Chí Minh City II W.F.C. and others

== See also ==
- Long Thanh (disambiguation)
