= Nguyễn Hạ Long =

Vietnamese footballer

Personal information
- Full name: Nguyễn Hạ Long
- Date of birth: 9 March 1994 (age 32)
- Place of birth: Kiến Xương, Thái Bình, Vietnam
- Height: 1.70 m (5 ft 7 in)
- Position: Midfielder

Team information
- Current team: Hồ Chí Minh City
- Number: 29

Youth career
- 2005–2007: Thái Binh
- 2007–2014: Nam Định

Senior career*
Years	Team	Apps	(Gls)
2014–2023	Nam Định	119	(2)
2023–2025	Hồ Chí Minh City (2015)	29	(1)
2025–	Hồ Chí Minh City (2025)	18	(1)

International career
2009–2010	Vietnam U16	12	(1)
- * Club domestic league appearances and goals as of 12 September 2026

Nguyễn Hạ Long (born 9 March 1994) is a Vietnamese professional footballer who plays as a midfielder for V.League 2 club Hồ Chí Minh City.

== Club career ==
Born in Thái Bình, Hạ Long began his professional career with Nam Định, where he had consecutive promotions with the club, from the Second League in 2014 to the V.League 2 in 2015, and to V.League 1 in 2018. He was named team captain for the 2023 season.

At the beginning of the 2023–24 season, he was then transferred to V.League 1 fellow Hồ Chí Minh City.

== International career ==
Hạ Long was part of the Vietnam U16 squad that won the 2010 AFF U-16 Youth Championship, and later participated in the 2010 AFC U-16 Championship.

== Honours ==
Nam Định

- V.League 2: 2017

Vietnam U16

- AFF U-16 Youth Championship: 2010
