= Đào Nhật Minh =

Vietnamese footballer (born 1992)

Personal information
- Full name: Đào Nhật Minh
- Date of birth: 27 April 1992 (age 34)
- Place of birth: Vân Đồn, Quảng Ninh, Vietnam
- Height: 1.75 m (5 ft 9 in)
- Position: Midfielder

Team information
- Current team: Thép Cần Thơ
- Number: 15

Senior career*
Years	Team	Apps	(Gls)
2014–2020	Than Quảng Ninh	75	(2)
2016	→ Hồ Chí Minh City (loan)	2	(0)
2021–2022	Hồng Lĩnh Hà Tĩnh	19	(0)
2023	SHB Đà Nẵng	12	(0)
2024–	Thép Cần Thơ	34	(1)

International career
2014–2015	Vietnam U23	2	(0)
- * Club domestic league appearances and goals as of 13 September 2026

Đào Nhật Minh (born 27 April 1992) is a Vietnamese professional footballer who plays as a midfielder for V.League 2 club Thép Cần Thơ.
