= Lâm Thuận =

Vietnamese footballer (born 1998)

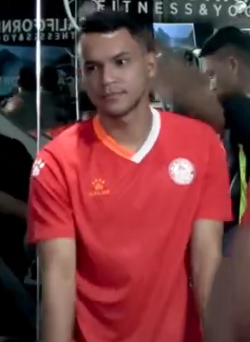
- Lâm Thuận in 2022

Personal information
- Full name: Lâm Thuận
- Date of birth: November 20, 1998 (age 27)
- Place of birth: Lộc Ninh, Bình Phước, Vietnam
- Height: 1.74 m (5 ft 9 in)
- Position: Winger

Team information
- Current team: Văn Hiến University
- Number: 17

Youth career
- 2009–2015: PVF

Senior career*
Years	Team	Apps	(Gls)
2016	Than Quảng Ninh	5	(0)
2017	Đồng Tháp	13	(2)
2018–2020	Bình Phước	35	(8)
2020–2021	Phố Hiến	22	(4)
2022	Sài Gòn	10	(0)
2023–2025	Hồ Chí Minh City (2015)	30	(1)
2025–2026	Hồ Chí Minh City (2025)	15	(1)
2026–	Văn Hiến University	0	(0)

International career
2015–2017	Vietnam U19	2	(0)
- * Club domestic league appearances and goals as of 7 June 2026

Lâm Thuận (born 20 November 1998) is a Vietnamese professional footballer who plays as a winger for V.League 2 club Văn Hiến University.

== Early life ==
He is of Stieng ethnic from Bình Phước.
