= Hồ Sỹ Giáp =

Vietnamese footballer (born 1994)

Personal information
- Full name: Hồ Sỹ Giáp
- Date of birth: April 18, 1994 (age 32)
- Place of birth: Bù Đăng, Bình Phước, Vietnam
- Height: 1.76 m (5 ft 9 in)
- Position: Forward

Team information
- Current team: Trường Tươi Đồng Nai
- Number: 93

Youth career
- 2006–2014: Bình Phước

Senior career*
Years	Team	Apps	(Gls)
2015–2016	Bình Phước	18	(12)
2017–2024	Becamex Bình Dương	97	(12)
2024–	Trường Tươi Đồng Nai	18	(0)
- * Club domestic league appearances and goals as of 30 May 2026

Hồ Sỹ Giáp (born 18 April 1994) is a Vietnamese professional footballer who plays as a forward for V.League 2 club Trường Tươi Đồng Nai.

== Honours ==
Becamex Bình Dương

- Vietnamese National Cup: 2018; runner-up: 2017
- Vietnamese Super Cup runner-up: 2019

Trường Tươi Đồng Nai

- V.League 2: 2025–26

Individual

- V.League 2 top scorer: 2016
