= Lê Văn Hưng (footballer, born 1987) =

Vietnamese footballer

Personal information
- Full name: Lê Văn Hưng
- Date of birth: 12 December 1987 (age 38)
- Place of birth: Mang Thít, Vĩnh Long, Vietnam
- Height: 1.78 m (5 ft 10 in)
- Position: Goalkeeper

Youth career
- 2004–2008: Vĩnh Long

Senior career*
Years	Team	Apps	(Gls)
2008–2013	Vĩnh Long		
2010–2011	→ Hồ Chí Minh City (loan)		
2012–2013	→ Kiên Giang (loan)	27	(0)
2014–2019	SHB Đà Nẵng	78	(0)
2020	Cần Thơ	10	(0)
2023–2024	Định Hướng Phú Nhuận		
2024–2025	Gia Định		
2025–2026	Long An	17	(0)

International career
2008–2010	Vietnam U22	3	(0)
- * Club domestic league appearances and goals as of 6 June 2026

Lê Văn Hưng (born 12 December 1987) is a Vietnamese professional footballer who last played as a goalkeeper for V.League 2 club Long An.

== Career ==
In November 2026, Văn Hưng was arrested for match-fixing during a game with Long An in the 2025–26 V.League 2.

== Personal life ==
Văn Hưng was born in Mang Thít District, Vĩnh Long. His father, a policeman, died when he was one. He and his two sisters were raised by his mom, an algae farmer.

For a while Văn Hưng was dating Vietnamese model Helen Pham and where the subject of much media attention. The couple broke up however in 2014 after his move to SHB Đà Nẵng.
