= Hoàng Thái Bình =

Vietnamese footballer (born 1998)

Personal information
- Full name: Hoàng Thái Bình
- Date of birth: 22 January 1998 (age 28)
- Place of birth: Thanh Hóa, Vietnam
- Height: 1.73 m (5 ft 8 in)
- Position: Left back

Team information
- Current team: Ninh Bình
- Number: 2

Youth career
- –2020: Thanh Hóa

Senior career*
Years	Team	Apps	(Gls)
2017–2018	→ Phù Đổng (loan)		
2020–2026	Đông Á Thanh Hóa	86	(0)
2022	→ Hải Phòng (loan)	20	(1)
2026–	Ninh Bình	7	(0)
- * Club domestic league appearances and goals as of 7 June 2026

Hoàng Thái Bình (born 22 January 1998) is a Vietnamese professional footballer who plays as a left back for V.League 1 team Ninh Bình.

== Club career ==
Born in Thanh Hóa, Thái Bình was a youth product of his hometown team Thanh Hóa. He was promoted to the first team in 2020, but was only the third choice left back at the team.

After returning from his loan spell at Hải Phòng, Thái Bình played more regularly. He was part of the team that win the 2023 Vietnamese Cup. In the following season, he started in the 2023–24 Vietnamese Cup final and scored the tournament-winning penalty kick for Thanh Hóa in a 9–8 victory against Hanoi FC, when the game went to penalties after a 0–0 draw..

In 2022, Thái Bình joined Hải Phòng on a one-season loan deal. He was a starter for the team throughout the season, playing an important role to help the club finish as league runners-up.

In January 2026, Thái Bình was transferred to V.League 1 fellow Ninh Bình for an undisclosed transfer fee.

== International career ==
In September 2023, Thái Bình received his first call up to the Vietnam national team for the friendly game against Palestine.

== Honours ==
Dông Á Thanh Hóa

- Vietnamese Cup: 2023, 2023–24
- Vietnamese Super Cup: 2023
