= Nguyễn Thanh Long (footballer) =

Vietnamese footballer

Personal information
- Full name: Nguyễn Thanh Long
- Date of birth: 10 January 1993 (age 33)
- Place of birth: Hanoi, Vietnam
- Height: 1.80 m (5 ft 11 in)
- Position: Center-back

Team information
- Current team: Bắc Ninh
- Number: 7

Youth career
- 2009–2012: Thể Công
- 2012: Hà Nội

Senior career*
Years	Team	Apps	(Gls)
2018–2023	Becamex Bình Dương	74	(0)
2023–2025	Đông Á Thanh Hóa	31	(3)
2025–	Bắc Ninh	4	(0)

International career
2011	Vietnam U19	1	(0)
- * Club domestic league appearances and goals as of 17 May 2026

Nguyễn Thanh Long (born 10 January 1993) is a Vietnamese professional footballer who plays as a center-back for V.League 2 club Bắc Ninh.

== Career ==
Born in Hanoi, Thanh Long was a youth product of the army's club Thể Công. In 2012, the club dissolved, leading him to move to the Hà Nội youth team. However, the club also ceased operations shortly after. Left without a club, Thanh Long abandoned his football career on the advice of his parents and worked at the Ministry of Public Security. He continued playing football at amateur level, mainly in five-a-side tournaments.

In 2018, through some connections, Thanh Long went for a trial at V.League 1 side Becamex Bình Dương and was signed by the team, making his return as a footballer. He made his professional debut at the 2018 V.League 1.

In September 2023, Thanh Long joined V.League 1 fellow Đông Á Thanh Hóa. He featured in the 2023–24 Vietnamese Cup final, playing the full 90 minutes in a goalless draw against Hà Nội. In the penalty shootout, he succeeded in his attempt as Thanh Hóa won 9–8 and were crowned champions.

== Honours ==
Becamex Bình Dương

- Vietnamese Cup: 2018

Thanh Hóa

- Vietnamese Super Cup: 2023
- Vietnamese Cup: 2023–24
