= Van Hien University FC =

- Full name: Van Hien University Football Club (Câu lạc bộ bóng đá Đại học Văn Hiến)
- Founded: 14 May 2022; 4 years ago
- Ground: Thống Nhất Stadium
- Capacity: 14,400
- Manager: Hoàng Hải Dương
- League: V.League 2
- 2025–26: V.League 2, 7th of 12
- Website: van-hien-fc.com
Home colours	Away colours

Van Hien University Football Club (Vietnamese: Câu lạc bộ bóng đá Đại học Văn Hiến) is a professional Vietnamese football club based in Ho Chi Minh City. Founded in 2022, the club is managed and supported by Văn Hiến University. They currently compete in the V.League 2, the second highest tier of the Vietnamese football league system.

== History ==
The club was established in 2022, representing Văn Hiến University in student tournaments. In 2024, the semi-professional football team of Văn Hiến University competed in the Vietnamese Football League Second Division after purchasing the participation slot of Quảng Nam B. This was the first time that a university team appear in the Vietnamese football league system. The club is playing its home matches at the Thống Nhất Stadium in Hồ Chí Minh City.

In the 2025 season, Văn Hiến University got promoted to the 2025–26 V.League 2 after finishing first in Group B due to superior head-to-head points compared to Gia Định and Lâm Đồng at the end of the season, being the first student club to compete in professional league of Vietnam.

== Stadium ==
Văn Hiến University plays its home matches at the Thống Nhất Stadium in Ho Chi Minh City. The stadium has a seating capacity of 16,000.

== Coaching staff ==
Position	Name
Head coach	(Vietnam) Hoàng Hải Dương
Technical director	(Vietnam) Nguyễn Đình Hưng

== Players ==
=== Current squad ===
As of 8 September 2026

Note: Flags indicate national team as defined under FIFA eligibility rules; some limited exceptions apply. Players may hold more than one non-FIFA nationality.

No.	Pos.	Nation	Player
2	DF	VIE	Nguyễn Văn Nhuần
3	DF	VIE	Đinh Quý
4	DF	VIE	Nguyễn Bảo Chung
6	DF	VIE	Lê Vương Minh Nhất
7	MF	VIE	Đoàn Cao Danh
8	MF	VIE	Nguyễn Văn Dân
10	MF	VIE	Phù Trung Phong
11	DF	VIE	Nguyễn Văn Quý
12	FW	VIE	Nguyễn Ngọc Hậu
13	DF	VIE	Nguyễn Hữu Trọng
16	FW	VIE	Nguyễn Văn Văn
17	MF	VIE	Lâm Thuận
18	FW	VIE	Lương Quốc Thắng

No.	Pos.	Nation	Player
21	DF	VIE	Nguyễn Trọng Nam
23	MF	VIE	Trương Văn Thái Quý
24	MF	VIE	Nguyễn Văn Ka
25	GK	VIE	Nguyễn Thanh Tuấn
28	GK	VIE	Vũ Ngọc Mạnh
29	FW	DEN	Ilias Namli
30	MF	VIE	Đào Văn Chưởng
31	DF	VIE	Trần Anh Thi
32	DF	VIE	Trương Dủ Đạt
37	GK	VIE	Nguyễn Lê Nhật Quang
77	MF	VIE	Nguyễn Văn Ngọc
99	FW	VIE	Nguyễn Khắc Khiêm

Note: Flags indicate national team as defined under FIFA eligibility rules; some limited exceptions apply. Players may hold more than one non-FIFA nationality.

No.	Pos.	Nation	Player
—	MF	VIE	Lê Cảnh Gia Huy

== Honours ==
- Vietnamese Second League
  - Winners (Group B):** 2025
