= Trương Văn Thái Quý =

Vietnamese footballer

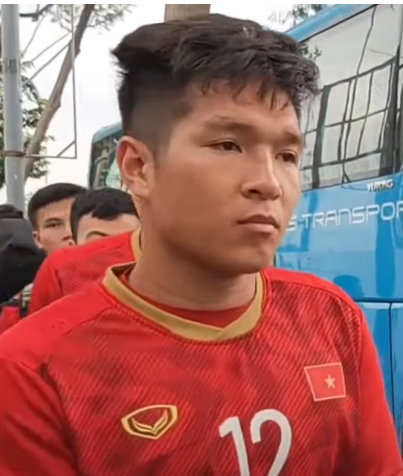
- Thái Quý in 2019

Personal information
- Full name: Trương Văn Thái Quý
- Date of birth: August 22, 1997 (age 29)
- Place of birth: Đông Hà, Quảng Trị, Vietnam
- Height: 1.68 m (5 ft 6 in)
- Positions: Defensive midfielder; right-back

Team information
- Current team: Văn Hiến University
- Number: 23

Youth career
- 2009–2015: PVF Football Academy

Senior career*
Years	Team	Apps	(Gls)
2016	→ Than Quảng Ninh (loan)	1	(0)
2017–2026	Hà Nội	105	(5)
2025–2026	→ PVF-CAND (loan)	15	(0)
2026–	Văn Hiến University	0	(0)

International career^{‡}
2015–2016	Vietnam U19	8	(0)
2017–2020	Vietnam U23	9	(0)
2022	Vietnam	1	(0)
Medal record
Vietnam under-23
AFC U-23 Championship
Runner-up	AFC U-23 Championship	2018
- * Club domestic league appearances and goals as of 12 June 2026 ‡ National team caps and goals as of 8 September 2019

Trương Văn Thái Quý (born 22 August 1997) is a Vietnamese professional footballer who plays as a defensive midfielder or right back for V.League 2 club Văn Hiến University.

== Career ==
=== Hà Nội ===
Thái Quý began his professional career with V.League 1 side Hà Nội, joining the club in 2017. Over the following seasons, he established himself as a versatile and hard-working player, capable of operating both in defensive midfield and at right back.

On 4 August 2022, Trương agreed to a contract extension with Hà Nội, keeping him at the club until 2026.

One of the most memorable moments of his career came on 27 November 2022 during the final of the Vietnamese Cup against Bình Định. With Hà Nội leading 1–0, Thái Quý observed that opposing goalkeeper Đặng Văn Lâm had advanced far off his line. From roughly 75 meters just inside his own half, Thái Quý struck a lofted shot that sailed over the goalkeeper and into the net, sealing Hà Nội’s victory. The goal was widely praised as one of the most spectacular long-range strikes in the competition’s history.

== Honours ==
Hà Nội

- V.League 1: 2018, 2019, 2022
- Vietnamese National Cup: 2019, 2020, 2022
- Vietnamese Super Cup: 2019, 2020, 2021

Vietnam U23

- SEA Games gold medal: 2019
- AFC U-23 Championship runners-up: 2018
