= Văn Hiến University =

University in Ho Chi Minh City, Vietnam

- Trường Đại học Văn Hiến
- Established: 1997
- Location: 10.8037°N 106.6850°E
- Website: http://www.vhu.edu.vn/
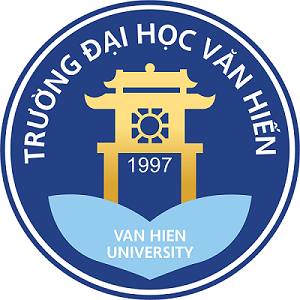

Van Hien University is a university located in Tân Phú ward, Ho Chi Minh City, Vietnam. It is a private university established in 1997. Van Hien University presently has ten faculties: Tourism, Economics and Management, Information Technology, Social Studies and Telecommunication, Technologies and Engineerings, Finance and Accounting (including Department of Laws), Foreign Languages, Oriental Studies, Arts, and Medical and Pharmacy.

== Football team ==
Not only involving Vietnamese university league with its student football clubs, in 2024, the semi-professional football team of Văn Hiến University competed in the Vietnamese Football League Second Division after purchasing the participation slot of Quảng Nam B. This was the first time that a university team appear in the Vietnamese football league system..

In the 2025 season, Văn Hiến University got promoted to the 2025–26 V.League 2 after finishing first in Group B, being the first student club to compete in professional league of Vietnam.
