= Bùi Văn Hiếu =

Vietnamese footballer (born 1989)

Personal information
- Full name: Bùi Văn Hiếu
- Date of birth: October 2, 1989 (age 37)
- Place of birth: Hạ Long, Quảng Ninh, Vietnam
- Height: 1.72 m (5 ft 8 in)
- Position: Midfielder

Team information
- Current team: Thép Cần Thơ
- Number: 6

Youth career
- 2002–2008: Than Quảng Ninh

Senior career*
| Years | Team | Apps | (Gls) |
| 2009–2010 | Than Quảng Ninh | 15 | (0) |
| 2011–2015 | Hà Nội | 66 | (2) |
| 2015–2018 | Than Quảng Ninh | 48 | (3) |
| 2018–2019 | Thanh Hóa | 29 | (2) |
| 2020–2021 | Topeland Bình Định | 25 | (1) |
| 2022–2023 | Quảng Nam | 22 | (1) |
| 2024– | Thép Cần Thơ | 38 | (8) |

International career
| 2012–2014 | Vietnam | 3 | (0) |
- * Club domestic league appearances and goals as of 12 September 2026

Bùi Văn Hiếu (born 2 October 1989) is a Vietnamese professional footballer who plays as a midfielder for V.League 2 club Thép Cần Thơ. He appeared 3 times for the Vietnam national team between 2012 and 2014.

== Honours ==
Hà Nội

- V.League 1: 2013

Quảng Nam

- V.League 2: 2023
