= Thep Can Tho FC =

Vietnamese football club

- Full name: Thep Can Tho Football Club (Câu lạc bộ bóng đá Thép Cần Thơ)
- Founded: July 1, 2024; 2 years ago
- Ground: Cần Thơ Stadium
- Capacity: 30,000
- Chairman: Đoàn Khánh Tùng
- Manager: Nguyễn Văn Đàn
- League: V.League 2
- 2025–26: V.League 2, 9th of 12
Home colours	Away colours

Thep Can Tho Football Club (Vietnamese: Câu lạc bộ bóng đá Thép Cần Thơ), formely known as Quang Ninh, is a Vietnamese football club based in Cần Thơ. The club is playing its home matches at the 30,000-capacity Cần Thơ Stadium. They currently play in the V.League 2, the second highest tier of the Vietnamese football league system.

== History ==
=== Quảng Ninh era ===
Following the dissolution of Than Quảng Ninh in 2021, Quảng Ninh province had no more football teams competing in Vietnamese football system. On 1 July 2024, under the proposal of Quảng Ninh province's Department of Culture and Sports, the Quảng Ninh Football Development Joint Stock Company was established, headquartered in Hạ Long, put in the place the Quang Ninh FC.

Quang Ninh entried the 2024 Vietnamese Third Division, being placed in Group A. The team's squad and staff was composed of many members of the former Than Quang Ninh team. During their first season The team won 5 games and drew 2, finished first in the group, thus promote to the 2025 Vietnamese Second Division.

During their second season, the club won 8 games and drew 2, finished first in the group again. Leading Quang Ninh promoted to V.League 2 as professional football for the first time ever.

=== Relocation to Cần Thơ ===
After finishing ninth in their first ever season at the V.League 2, Xuân Thiện Group acquired Quảng Ninh FC. The club then relocated to Cần Thơ, and changed their name to Thép Cần Thơ in September 2026.

== Coaching staff ==
Position	Name
Head coach	(Vietnam) Nguyễn Văn Đàn
Technical director	(Vietnam) Nguyễn Thành Công
Assistant coach	(Vietnam) Hồ Văn Thuận (Vietnam) Nguyễn Văn Thắng (Vietnam) Trần Minh Thắng
Goalkeeper coach	(Vietnam) Võ Văn Hạnh
Doctor	(Vietnam) Lê Hữu Hạnh

== Current squad ==
As of 20 September 2026

Note: Flags indicate national team as defined under FIFA eligibility rules; some limited exceptions apply. Players may hold more than one non-FIFA nationality.

No.	Pos.	Nation	Player
3	DF	VIE	Kiều Minh Đức
4	DF	VIE	Đặng Khánh Duy (on loan from Hoàng Anh Gia Lai)
6	MF	VIE	Bùi Văn Hiếu
7	FW	VIE	Nguyễn Văn Đô
8	MF	VIE	Vũ Minh Tuấn
9	FW	VIE	Bùi Anh Thống
10	MF	VIE	Nguyễn Đức Hữu
12	GK	VIE	Dương Văn Lợi (on loan from Hoàng Anh Gia Lai)
14	DF	VIE	Lê Tuấn Tú
15	MF	VIE	Đào Nhật Minh
16	DF	VIE	Đặng Tuấn Nghĩa
17	DF	VIE	Phạm Bá Thảo (on loan from SHB Đà Nẵng)
19	MF	VIE	Vũ Mạnh Duy
20	MF	VIE	Phạm Nguyễn Quốc Trung (on loan from Sông Lam Nghệ An)
21	DF	VIE	Đoàn Văn Quý
22	FW	VIE	Trần Tiến Anh
23	MF	VIE	Hồ Long Vũ

No.	Pos.	Nation	Player
26	GK	VIE	Dương Văn Cường
27	MF	VIE	Phạm Văn Sơn
29	MF	VIE	Nguyễn Trọng Bảo
30	FW	VIE	Vũ Thế Vương
32	GK	VIE	Đinh Hoàng Quý
33	DF	VIE	Tạ Việt Sơn
34	DF	VIE	Võ Hoàng Huy
68	DF	VIE	Lê Nguyễn Văn Thọ (on loan from SHB Đà Nẵng)
71	DF	VIE	Trần Quang Thịnh
73	MF	VIE	Bùi Quang Huy (on loan from SHB Đà Nẵng)
77	FW	VIE	Nguyễn Văn Vinh
79	DF	VIE	Hà Văn Việt (on loan from PVF)
83	DF	VIE	Phạm Thế Nam (on loan from Hoàng Anh Gia Lai)
88	DF	VIE	Nguyễn Hữu Thực
94	MF	VIE	Nguyễn Hùng Khang (on loan from Hoàng Anh Gia Lai)
97	MF	VIE	Nguyễn Vũ Linh
99	FW	BRA	Tháileon
