= Phan Đình Vũ Hải =

Vietnamese footballer

Personal information
- Full name: Phan Đình Vũ Hải
- Date of birth: 4 June 1994 (age 32)
- Place of birth: Hương Sơn, Hà Tĩnh, Vietnam
- Height: 1.83 m (6 ft 0 in)
- Position: Goalkeeper

Team information
- Current team: Thái Nguyên
- Number: 24

Youth career
- 2007–2012: Hà Tĩnh
- 2013–2016: Hải Phòng

Senior career*
Years	Team	Apps	(Gls)
2017–2022	Hải Phòng	14	(0)
2018	→ Sông Lam Nghệ An (loan)	22	(0)
2020	→ Than Quảng Ninh (loan)	1	(0)
2023	Long An	2	(0)
2023–2026	Hoàng Anh Gia Lai	6	(0)
2025–2026	→ Hồ Chí Minh City Youth (loan)	17	(0)
2026–	Thái Nguyên	6	(0)
- * Club domestic league appearances and goals as of 1 November 2026

Phan Đình Vũ Hải (born 6 June 1994) is a Vietnamese professional footballer who plays as a goalkeeper for V.League 2 club Thái Nguyên.
