= Tháileon =

Brazilian footballer (born 2001)

Personal information
- Full name: Tháileon De Santana Santos
- Date of birth: 3 August 2001 (age 25)
- Place of birth: Anchieta, Espírito Santo, Brazil
- Height: 1.84 m (6 ft 0 in)
- Position: Striker

Team information
- Current team: Thep Can Tho
- Number: 99

Youth career
- Friburguense

Senior career*
Years	Team	Apps	(Gls)
2020–2021	Friburguense	17	(0)
2022	Grêmio São-Carlense	0	(0)
2023	Inter de Minas	5	(2)
2024	CEOV Operário	6	(2)
2024	Boa	5	(1)
2024	Guarani-MG	14	(15)
2025	Pouso Alegre	8	(2)
2025	Cong An Hanoi	3	(0)
2025–2026	Quy Nhon United	19	(14)
2026	Cong An Nhan Dan	0	(0)
2026–	Thep Can Tho	3	(1)
- * Club domestic league appearances and goals as of 23 October 2026

Tháileon De Santana Santos (born 3 August 2001), simply known as Tháileon, is a Brazilian professional footballer who plays as a striker for V.League 2 team Thep Can Tho.

== Club career ==
Being a youth product of Friburguense, Tháileon made his senior debut with the team in 2021.

In 2024, Tháileon lead Guarani-MG to win the Campeonato Mineiro Segunda Divisão. With 15 goals, he was also the top scorer of the league.

On 11 March 2025, Tháileon moved to Vietnam, signing for V.League 1 team Cong An Hanoi. After a few months at the club, he was transferred to V.League 2 club Quy Nhon United. Tháileon helped his club finished fourth in the 2025–26 V.League 2 with 14 goals scored, thus finished as the league top scorer.

On 30 June 2026, Tháileon was transferred to Cong An Nhan Dan. Without any appearance for the team, he joined league fellow Thep Can Tho in September 2026. In his debut, he scored the only goal of the game to help his team defeat V.League 1 team Haiphong in the Vietnamese Cup qualifying round.

== Personal life ==
Tháileon's parents named him after Daileon, a massive transforming mecha and spaceship from the 1985 Japanese tokusatsu series MegaBeast Investigator Juspion.

== Honours ==
Guarani-MG

- Campeonato Mineiro Segunda Divisão: 2024

Cong An Hanoi

- Vietnamese Cup: 2024–25
- ASEAN Club Championship runner-up: 2024-25

Individual

- Campeonato Mineiro Segunda Divisão top scorer: 2024
- V.League 2 top scorer: 2025–26
- V.League 2 Team of the Season: 2025–26
