= Liễu Quang Vinh =

Vietnamese footballer (born 1999)

Personal information
- Full name: Liễu Quang Vinh
- Date of birth: 30 May 1999 (age 27)
- Place of birth: Sóc Trăng, Vietnam
- Height: 1.77 m (5 ft 10 in)
- Positions: Center back; left back

Team information
- Current team: SHB Đà Nẵng
- Number: 86

Youth career
- 2012–2017: PVF
- 2017–2018: SHB Đà Nẵng

Senior career*
Years	Team	Apps	(Gls)
2018–2022	SHB Đà Nẵng	8	(0)
2022	Sài Gòn	11	(0)
2023–	SHB Đà Nẵng	25	(0)

International career
2017–2018	Vietnam U19		
2022–2023	Vietnam U23	2	(0)
- * Club domestic league appearances and goals as of 31 March 2024

Liễu Quang Vinh (born 30 May 1999) is a Vietnamese professional footballer who plays as a center back or left back for V.League 1 club SHB Đà Nẵng.

== Early career ==
Born in Sóc Trăng, Quang Vinh started playing football at an early age, representing his school teams. At the age of 13, he was admitted to the PVF Football Academy. From then on, he received systematic training, helping him progress quickly and more mature in his style of play.

== Club career ==
In 2017, Quang Vinh completed his formation at the PVF Academy and was released by the club. He chose to join by SHB Đà Nẵng and trained with the reserves before getting promoted to the first team in 2019.

In the first season with the club, he had very limited game time and only had 4 appearances. He was later repositioned by coach Lê Huỳnh Đức to play as a center back instead of left back. This changement allowed him to gain more game time. However, he suffered a broken cartilage injury during a training session shortly after, which kept him out of the field for several months.

On 17 August 2022, Quang Vinh signed for Sài Gòn. He became the starter of the club at the second part of the 2022 V.League 1 season, but failed to save his club from a relegation. Following the club's relegation, Liễu Quang Vinh was released.

In 2023, Quang Vinh made his return to SHB Đà Nẵng. His club finished last in the 2023 V.League 1 season, thus relegated to the V.League 2.

== International career ==
In January 2022, Quang Vinh received his first call up to the Vietnam national team to prepare for the World Cup qualifiers games against Australia and China.

== Honours ==
SHB Đà Nẵng

- V.League 2: 2023–24
