= Phan Văn Hiếu =

Vietnamese footballer

Personal information
- Full name: Phan Văn Hiếu
- Date of birth: 23 August 2000 (age 26)
- Place of birth: Lộc Hà, Hà Tĩnh, Vietnam
- Height: 1.76 m (5 ft 9 in)
- Position: Midfielder

Team information
- Current team: Đồng Nai City
- Number: 24

Youth career
- 2015–2019: Hà Tĩnh Sports Center

Senior career*
Years	Team	Apps	(Gls)
2019–2020	Nam Định B		
2020–2022	Nam Định	24	(1)
2023–2025	Công An Hà Nội	10	(0)
2023–2025	→ Phù Đổng Ninh Bình (loan)	19	(2)
2025–2026	Bắc Ninh	20	(5)
2026–	Đồng Nai City	1	(0)
- * Club domestic league appearances and goals as of 13 September 2026

Phan Văn Hiếu (born 23 August 2000) is a Vietnamese professional footballer who plays as a midfielder for V.League 1 club Đồng Nai City.

== Early career ==
Văn Hiếu began his football career at the age of 15 years old when he was recruited to the U-15 side of the Hà Tĩnh Sports Center team as a supplementary arrival as the team lacked players. However, he kept up very quickly with the coaching staff's training plan by the and was among the most promising players of the team. In mid-2019, after Hà Tĩnh Sports Center disbanded, Văn Hiếu and 4 other players were introduced to Nam Định B team to participate in the Vietnamese Second Division.

== Club career ==
After good performances with Nam Định's reserve side, Văn Hiếu was promoted to the first team for the 2020 V.League 1. On 14 March 2020, he made his professional debut in his team's 2–1 win against the club of his hometown Hồng Lĩnh Hà Tĩnh. He scored his first career goal on 27 August 2022 against SHB Đà Nẵng, helping his team win 2–1.

Văn Hiếu joined Công An Hà Nội for the 2023 V.League 1 season. He made 10 appearances during the season as his team were crowned as league champion.

In October 2023, Văn Hiếu joined V.League 2 side Phù Đổng Ninh Bình on a loan.

Văn Hiếu signed for V.League 2 club Bắc Ninh. He scored 5 goals during the season and played an important role to help his club promote to the 2026–27 V.League 1.

In July 2026, Văn Hiếu moved to newly promoted V.League 1 club Đồng Nai City.

== Honours ==
Công An Hà Nội

- V.League 1: 2023

Phù Đổng Ninh Bình

- V.League 2: 2024–25

Individual

- V.League 2 Team of the Season: 2025–26
