= Ho Chi Minh City Youth FC =

Vietnamese football club

- Full name: Câu lạc bộ bóng đá Thanh niên Thành phố Hồ Chí Minh (Ho Chi Minh City Youth Football Club)
- Founded: 2019; 7 years ago
- Ground: Pleiku Stadium
- Capacity: 15,000
- Owner: Ho Chi Minh City Sports Department
- Manager: Lương Trung Tuấn
- League: Vietnamese Second Division
- 2025–26: V.League 2, 12th of 12 (relegated)
- Website: Official website
| Home colours | Away colours | Third colours |

Ho Chi Minh City Youth FC (Vietnamese: Câu lạc bộ bóng đá Thanh Niên Thành phố Hồ Chí Minh) is a Vietnamese football club based in Ho Chi Minh City. The club is playing its home matches at the 15,000-capacity Thống Nhất Stadium. They currently play in the V.League 2, after winning the promotion play-off game in the 2024 Vietnamese Second Division.

== History ==
Ho Chi Minh City Youth was established in 2019 to compete in the Vietnamese Third Division, the fourth tier of Vietnamese football system. The team was owned by the Thống Nhất Sports Center. In the first season at the Third Division, club finished first in their group, thus gain a promotion to be 2020 Vietnamese Second Division.

In 2024, Vietnamese retail bank LPBank became the main sponsor of the club and rebranded the club name into the current LPBank Ho Chi Minh City FC but failed to register the name changed before the deadline set by Vietnam Football Federation. Consequently, they competed under the old name Ho Chi Minh City Youth FC during the season. The team managed to finish second in their group in the Second Division, gaining them a qualification to the promotion play-off game. There, they defeated Bắc Ninh in the penalty shootout (after a 2–2 draw) and promoted to the 2024–25 V.League 2. Before the beginning of the season, the owner of the team decided to swap the entire squad and staff members of LPBank HCMC with Phù Đổng Ninh Bình, another team belonging to LPBank.

On 9 September 2025, the club's request to change their name from Trẻ Thành phố Hồ Chí Minh to Thanh Niên Thành phố Hồ Chí Minh and crests was approved by VPF (both names mean Ho Chi Minh City Youth in English).

== Coaching staff ==
| Position | Name |
|---|---|
| Head coach | (Vietnam) Lương Trung Tuấn |
| Assistant coach | (Vietnam) Hoàng Tuấn Anh |
| Technical analyst | (Vietnam) Nguyễn Anh Tuấn (Vietnam) Nguyễn Hồng Phong |
| Doctor | (Vietnam) Phạm Văn Minh |

== Current squad ==
As of 18 March 2026

Note: Flags indicate national team as defined under FIFA eligibility rules; some limited exceptions apply. Players may hold more than one non-FIFA nationality.

| No. | Pos. | Nation | Player |
|---|---|---|---|
| 2 | DF | VIE | Ngô Trung Thắng (on loan from Hoàng Anh Gia Lai) |
| 7 | DF | VIE | Đặng Khánh Duy (on loan from Hoàng Anh Gia Lai) |
| 9 | FW | VIE | Phan Trí Dũng (on loan from Hoàng Anh Gia Lai) |
| 10 | FW | VIE | Hoàng Minh Tiến (on loan from Hoàng Anh Gia Lai) |
| 11 | FW | VIE | Lê Anh Toàn (on loan from SHB Đà Nẵng) |
| 12 | DF | VIE | Đinh Thế Chung (on loan from Hoàng Anh Gia Lai) |
| 13 | MF | VIE | Võ Trần Minh Vũ (on loan from Hoàng Anh Gia Lai) |
| 15 | MF | VIE | Cao Văn Lai (on loan from Hoàng Anh Gia Lai) |
| 17 | DF | VIE | Hồ Sỹ Minh (on loan from Hoàng Anh Gia Lai) |
| 18 | MF | VIE | Lê Hữu Phước (on loan from Hoàng Anh Gia Lai) |
| 20 | MF | VIE | Nguyễn Phi Hùng |
| 22 | GK | VIE | Nguyễn Hữu Long (on loan from Hoàng Anh Gia Lai) |
| 23 | MF | VIE | Trần Hoàng Sang (on loan from Hoàng Anh Gia Lai) |

| No. | Pos. | Nation | Player |
|---|---|---|---|
| 24 | GK | VIE | Phan Đình Vũ Hải (on loan from Hoàng Anh Gia Lai) |
| 25 | DF | VIE | Lê Nguyễn Anh Duy (on loan from Hoàng Anh Gia Lai) |
| 27 | MF | VIE | K'Vướng (on loan from Hoàng Anh Gia Lai) |
| 47 | DF | VIE | Đinh Thành Đạt (on loan from Hoàng Anh Gia Lai) |
| 63 | MF | VIE | Nguyễn Quốc Vương (on loan from Hoàng Anh Gia Lai) |
| 69 | DF | FRA | Evan Abran (on loan from Ninh Bình) |
| 71 | GK | VIE | Trần Mai Gia Phúc (on loan from Hoàng Anh Gia Lai) |
| 79 | DF | VIE | Trần Tiến Đạt |
| 81 | FW | VIE | Nay Di Đan (on loan from Ninh Bình) |
| 86 | DF | VIE | Dụng Quang Vinh (on loan from Ninh Bình) |
| 90 | FW | BRA | Victor Sales |
| 92 | DF | VIE | Nguyễn Hữu Trọng |
