= Zan Nguyen =

American soccer player (born 2006)

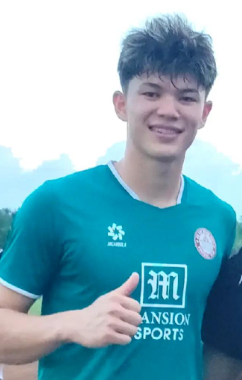
- Zan Nguyen in 2025

Personal information
- Full name: Zan Hoyt Le Cao Nguyen
- Date of birth: April 24, 2006 (age 20)
- Place of birth: Rockport, United States
- Height: 1.93 m (6 ft 4 in)
- Position: Striker

Team information
- Current team: Ho Chi Minh City
- Number: 7

Youth career
- 2022-2023: Seacoast United
- 2016–2024: DSA United

Senior career*
| Years | Team | Apps | (Gls) |
| 2024–2025 | Ho Chi Minh City (2016) | 2 | (0) |
| 2025– | Ho Chi Minh City (2025) | 8 | (2) |
- * Club domestic league appearances and goals as of June 6, 2026

Zan Hoyt Le Cao Nguyen (born April 24, 2006) is an American professional soccer player who plays as a forward for the V.League 2 club Ho Chi Minh City.

== Career ==
Nguyen was born in Boston, United States to parents of Vietnamese descent.

In the 2022–23 season, Nguyen played for Seacoast United U17. He then played for Medomak Valley High School, before deciding to return to Vietnam to play football in August 2024. There, he went for a trial at V.League 1 club Ho Chi Minh City. On August 28, 2024, he was signed by the club with a three-year contract. On January 24, 2025, Nguyen made his professional debut in Ho Chi Minh City's 1–0 victory over SHB Da Nang in the V.League 1.
