= Tô Văn Vũ =

Vietnamese footballer (born 1993)

Personal information
- Full name: Tô Văn Vũ
- Date of birth: 20 October 1993 (age 33)
- Place of birth: Quảng Xương, Thanh Hóa, Vietnam
- Height: 1.71 m (5 ft 7 in)
- Positions: Right winger; right-back

Team information
- Current team: Thép Xanh Nam Định
- Number: 28

Youth career
- 2012–2015: Đồng Nai

Senior career*
Years	Team	Apps	(Gls)
2016	Đồng Nai	16	(2)
2017–2022	Becamex Bình Dương	106	(8)
2023	Công An Hà Nội	10	(0)
2023	→ Thép Xanh Nam Định (loan)	8	(1)
2023–	Thép Xanh Nam Định	53	(2)

International career
2024–	Vietnam	1	(0)
- * Club domestic league appearances and goals as of 7 June 2026

Tô Văn Vũ (born 20 October 1993) is a Vietnamese professional footballer who plays as a right winger or right-back for V.League 1 club Thép Xanh Nam Định.

== Club career ==
Tô Văn Vũ was born in Quảng Xương District, Thanh Hóa. After finishing high school, Tô Văn Vũ and his mother, Mrs. Cao Thị Tuyết, moving to Đồng Nai.

At the age of 20, Văn Vũ was invited by a friend to try out for the U-21 Đồng Nai side due to a shortage of players for the Vietnamese U-21 Championship. After a week of trial, he was signed by the ckub and officially began his football career at the age of 20. In 2014, despite the difficulties faced by the Đồng Nai club following a match-fixing scandal involving several players, Tô Văn Vũ decided to stay and train with the youth team.

The 2016 V.League 2 season was Văn Vũ's first professional season. He regularly started and scored 2 goals. However, Đồng Nai failed to secure promotion after losing to Nam Định in the promotion play-off game.

After the dissolution of Đồng Nai, Tô Văn Vũ followed coach Trần Bình Sự to Becamex Bình Dương. There, he played in V.League 1. At the end of the 2022 season, Tô Văn Vũ announced his departure from Becamex Bình Dương after six years with the club. During his time at the club, he made a total of 106 appearances and scored 8 goals in the V.League 1.

On 4 January 2023, Công An Hà Nội announced that they had successfully recruited player Tô Văn Vũ. By 9 October, 2023, Thép Xanh Nam Định announced that they had signed a three-season contract with Văn Vũ, starting from the second phase of the 2023 V.League 1, during which he previously played on loan.

== International career ==
In February 2022, coach Park Hang-seo called up Văn Vũ to the Vietnam national team to prepare for the match against China in the third round of the 2022 World Cup qualifiers. He made his senior international debut on 12 October 2024, in a friendly against India.

== Career statistics ==
=== Club ===
As of match played 24 January 2025

Appearances and goals by club, season and competition
Club	Season	League			National cup		Continental		Other		Total	
Club	Season	Division	Apps	Goals	Apps	Goals	Apps	Goals	Apps	Goals	Apps	Goals
Đồng Nai	2016	V.League 2	16	2	1	0	—		1 (Note: Appearances in V.League promotion/relegation play-off)	0	18	2
Becamex Bình Dương	2017	V.League 1	14	1	7	3	—		—		21	4
Becamex Bình Dương	2018	V.League 1	21	1	6	3	—		—		27	4
Becamex Bình Dương	2019	V.League 1	22	1	3	0	9 (Note: Appearances in the AFC Cup)	3	1 (Note: Appearances in Vietnamese Super Cup)	0	35	4
Becamex Bình Dương	2020	V.League 1	18	1	2	0	—		—		20	1
Becamex Bình Dương	2021	V.League 1	11	2	1	0	—		—		12	2
Becamex Bình Dương	2022	V.League 1	20	2	1	0	—		—		21	2
Becamex Bình Dương	Total		106	8	20	6	9	3	1	0	136	17
Công an Hà Nội	2023	V.League 1	10	0	1	0	—		—		11	0
Thép Xanh Nam Định	2023	V.League 1	8	1	1	0	—		—		9	1
Thép Xanh Nam Định	2023–24	V.League 1	14	1	7	3	—		—		21	4
Thép Xanh Nam Định	2024–25	V.League 1	11	1	1	0	6 (Note: Appearances in the AFC Champions League Two)	1	1	0	19	2
Thép Xanh Nam Định	Total		41	3	5	0	6	1	1	0	53	4
Career total			173	13	27	6	15	4	3	0	218	23

=== International ===
As of match played 12 October 2024

Appearances and goals by national team and year
National team	Year	Apps	Goals
Vietnam	2024	1	0
Total		1	0

== Honours ==
Becamex Bình Dương

- Vietnamese National Cup: 2018; Runner-up 2017
- Vietnamese Super Cup: Runner-up 2019

Công An Hà Nội

- V.League 1: 2023

Thép Xanh Nam Định

- V.League 1: 2023–24, 2024–25
- Vietnamese Super Cup: 2024
