= Vũ Minh Tuấn =

Vietnamese footballer

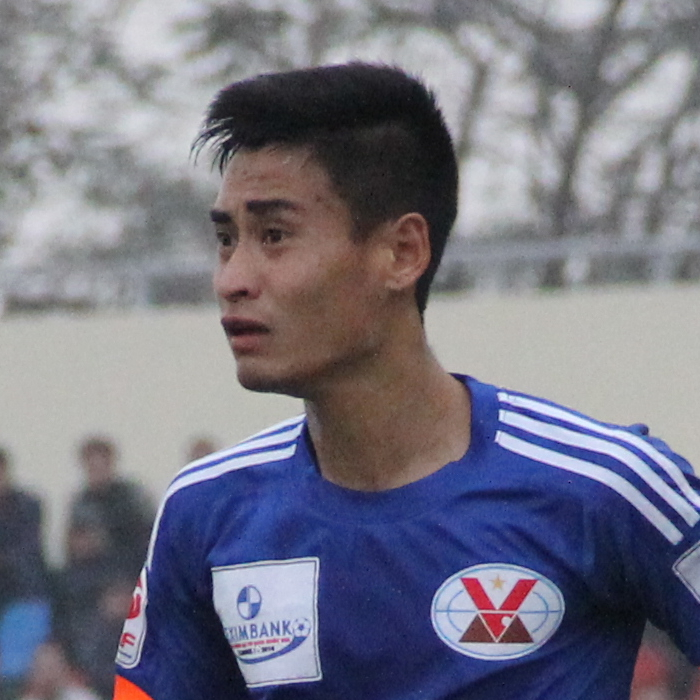
- Vu Minh Tuan playing for Than Quang Ninh in 2014

Personal information
- Full name: Vũ Minh Tuấn
- Date of birth: 19 September 1990 (age 36)
- Place of birth: Cẩm Phả, Quảng Ninh, Vietnam
- Height: 1.74 m (5 ft 9 in)
- Position: Central midfielder

Team information
- Current team: Thép Cần Thơ
- Number: 8

Youth career
- 2005–2008: Than Quảng Ninh

Senior career*
Years	Team	Apps	(Gls)
2009–2017	Than Quảng Ninh	144	(55)
2018	FLC Thanh Hóa	24	(4)
2019–2021	Viettel	44	(5)
2022–2023	Hà Nội	12	(0)
2023–2025	Quy Nhơn Bình Định	43	(6)
2025–	Thép Cần Thơ	10	(1)

International career^{‡}
2013–2014	Vietnam U23	19	(6)
2014–2017	Vietnam	15	(4)
- * Club domestic league appearances and goals as of 6 June 2026 ‡ National team caps and goals as of 29 June 2017

Vũ Minh Tuấn (born 19 September 1990) is a Vietnamese professional footballer who plays for V.League 2 club Thép Cần Thơ.

Vũ Minh Tuấn began his career with Than Quang Ninh and progressed through the ranks. He scored 64 goals in 167 games as a midfielder for the club. In 2018, he signed for Thanh Hóa, but left a year later to join Viettel. He helped Viettel win the V.League 1, the club's first league title in 22 years. Minh Tuấn joined Hà Nội for free in early 2022. He remained at the team for two seasons, and signed for Bình Định in 2023.

== Club career ==
Born and raised in Cẩm Phả, his father was a former footballer, spending most his career at Than Quảng Ninh. As the result, Minh Tuấn also played for the youth ranks of Than Quảng Ninh.

In 2008, at the age of 18, Minh Tuấn was named to the first team of the Than Quảng Ninh to participate in the National First Division that year. In 2012, he was one of the contributors to Than Quảng Ninh U21's bronze medal at the National U-21 Championship.

In the 2013 V.League 2, Minh Tuấn scored 5 goals for the team, contrubuted to help the team finish second in the V.League 2, winning them a promotion to V.League 1.

In 2018, Minh Tuấn signed for FLC Thanh Hóa and helped the team finish second in the 2018 V.League 1. He left the team after one season, joining V.League fellow Viettel. He was part of the Viettel squad that won the 2020 V.League 1, the club's first league title in 22 years.

At the start of the 2022 season, Minh Tuấn joined Hà Nội as a free agent. He played for the team during two seasons before joining Bình Định in 2023.

== Internationa career ==
In 2013, Minh Tuấn was called up to the Vietnam U23 team to take part in the 2013 SEA Games.

In 2014, Minh Tuấn received his first call up to the Vietnam national team for the final match of the 2015 AFC Asian Cup qualification against Hong Kong. He was also named in the squad for the 2014 AFF Championship and was considered by head coach Toshiya Miura as an important newcomer of the team.

== Career statistics ==
=== International ===
As of match played 5 September 2017

Appearances and goals by national team and year
National team	Year	Apps	Goals
Vietnam	2014	6	2
Vietnam	2015	2	0
Vietnam	2016	4	2
Vietnam	2017	3	0
Total		15	4

As of match played 5 September 2017
Vietnam score listed first, score column indicates score after each Tuấn goal

List of international goals scored by Vũ Minh Tuấn
No.	Date	Venue	Cap	Opponent	Score	Result	Competition
1	25 November 2014	Mỹ Đình National Stadium, Hanoi, Vietnam	5	Laos	1–0	3–0	2014 AFF Championship
2	28 November 2014	Mỹ Đình National Stadium, Hanoi, Vietnam	6	Philippines	2–0	3–1	2014 AFF Championship
3	9 October 2016	Maguwoharjo Stadium, Sleman, Indonesia	9	Indonesia	2–0	2–2	Friendly
4	7 December 2016	Mỹ Đình National Stadium, Hanoi, Vietnam	12	Indonesia	2–1	2–2	2016 AFF Championship

== Honours ==
Than Quảng Ninh

- Vietnamese National Cup: 2016
- Vietnamese Super Cup: 2017

Viettel

- V.League 1: 2020

Hà Nội

- V.League 1: 2022
- Vietnamese National Cup: 2022
- Vietnamese Super Cup: 2022

Vietnam

- AYA Bank Cup: 2016
- AFF Cup: third place 2014, 2016
