= Long Thạnh =

- Commune
- Location in Vietnam
- Coordinates: 9°50′9″N 105°15′9″E
- Country: Vietnam
- Region: Mekong Delta
- Province: An Giang
- Established: 1 July 2025
- Administrative headquarters: Bến Nhứt Hamlet

Area
  - Total: 96.37 km^{2} (37.21 sq mi)

Population (31 December 2024)
  - Total: 42,250
  - Density: 438/km^{2} (1,130/sq mi)
- Website: longthanh.angiang.gov.vn

Long Thạnh is a commune in An Giang province, Vietnam.

On 16 June 2025:

- The National Assembly of Vietnam adopted Resolution No. 203/2025/QH15, which provided for the termination of district-level administrative units nationwide from 1 July 2025.
- The Standing Committee of the National Assembly of Vietnam adopted Resolution No. 1654/NQ-UBTVQH15, providing for the establishment of Long Thạnh commune in An Giang province. The new commune was formed from the entire natural area and population of the former communes of Long Thạnh, Vĩnh Phú, and Vĩnh Thạnh, which were formerly part of Giồng Riềng district, Kiên Giang province.
