= Lương Trung Tuấn =

Vietnamese footballer (born 1975)

Personal information
- Full name: Lương Trung Tuấn
- Date of birth: 20 July 1975 (age 51)
- Place of birth: Tiểu Cần, Trà Vinh, Vietnam
- Height: 1.77 m (5 ft 10 in)
- Position: Defender

Youth career
- 1991–2000: Cảng Sài Gòn

Senior career*
Years	Team	Apps	(Gls)
2001–2002	Cảng Sài Gòn	17	(3)
2003	Hoàng Anh Gia Lai	23	(7)
2004–2006	Bình Định	38	(4)
2005	→ Port (loan)		
2007–2010	Becamex Bình Dương	29	(1)

International career
2002–2007	Vietnam	6	(0)
- * Club domestic league appearances and goals

Lương Trung Tuấn (born 20 July 1975) is a retired Vietnamese footballer. The first Vietnamese player played for V.League 1 in club Becamex Bình Dương

== Honours ==
=== Club ===
Hoàng Anh Gia Lai

- V-League: 2003

Bình Dương F.C.

- V-League: 2007, 2008
- Vietnamese Super Cup: 2007, 2008
