= Ho Chi Minh City FC (2025) =

Ho Chi Minh City
- Full name: Ho Chi Minh City Football Club
- Nickname: Ó Biển (The Seahawks)
- Founded: 1991; 35 years ago, as Ba Ria - Vung Tau; 2017; 9 years ago (re-established); 2025; 1 year ago, as Ho Chi Minh City
- Ground: Bà Rịa Stadium
- Capacity: 10,000
- Owner: Ba Ria - Vung Tau Football SJC
- Chairman: Daniel Nguyen
- Head coach: Nguyễn Minh Phương
- League: V.League 2
- 2025–26: V.League 2, 3rd of 12
- Website: hcmc-fc.com
Home colours	Away colours

Ho Chi Minh City Football Club (Vietnamese: Câu lạc bộ Bóng đá Thành phố Hồ Chí Minh), formerly known as Bà Rịa-Vũng Tàu, is a professional football club based in Bà Rịa ward, Ho Chi Minh City, Vietnam. The club is currently playing in the V.League 2.

== History ==
=== Founded ===
Ba Ria - Vung Tau football team was formed in 1991 and competed in the national A2 tournament, but then the provincial football movement went down and was interrupted in the period 1997–2006.

=== 2000s and disbandment ===
In 2006, the 2006–2009 football project was approved and implemented by the Provincial People's Committee with the goal of training the youth level, creating the expected force and team for the upper line. At that time, the provincial football team was established and played in the Vietnamese Second Division. Through the organization of the entrance exam, the U-15 football team was established, participating in training and coaching under the 4-year program (2006–2009). The team is focused on professional training and cultural learning in Ba Ria town. Due to the lack of resources, the selection of athletes from spontaneous movements is not systematic, so in the process of training and rubbing, the Training Board continues to screen out Typical children's athletes online, enrolling for practice and competition.

In 2007, Ba Ria - Vung Tau football team ranked first in Group D, entered the Vietnamese Second Division in Da Nang but failed. In 2008, the team was sponsored by the Construction Development and Investment Corporation (DIC Group) and renamed the football team DIC Ba Ria - Vung Tau, however, this year the team did not reach the target. In 2009, DIC Ba Ria – Vung Tau performed excellently in the group stage, winning all 5 matches, topping Group C and participating in the knockout stage. With the result of winning against the youth team of Tap doan Cao su Dong Thap, the team has completed the goal of the Project to be promoted to the Vietnamese Second Division.

In 2010, for the first time, DIC Ba Ria - Vung Tau participated in the Vietnamese Second Division. Despite many difficulties, at times it seemed impossible to stay in the league, but in the end, DIC Ba Ria - Vung Tau was successfully stayed in the league.

On November 14, 2012, coach Nguyen Trung Hau of Ba Ria - Vung Tau announced that the team was disbanded and did not participate in the 2013 V.League 2.

=== Reborn and higher ambitiions ===
On 15 September 2017, Ba Ria - Vung Tau Club was officially launched to start competing in the Vietnamese Third Division . On this occasion, Ba Ria - Vung Tau Football Joint Stock Company was also established by charter capital of 200 billion VND with the goal of long-term development, bringing football in the coastal city step by step to professional level. The club quickly gained promotion to the 2018 Second Division by topping Group B in the Third Division.

In the subsequent Second Division, the club finished the group stage with first place in Group B, qualifying for the promotion play-off round. In the semi-finals, the team was suddenly eliminated by Phu Dong with a score of 2–3. In the match for third place against Pho Hien, there was a fight between Ba Ria - Vung Tau players and the referees. A player of the team was fined VND 25 million and permanently banned from participating in football activities managed by the VFF. On 16 August 2019, Ba Ria - Vung Tau entered the final of the Second Division as the winner of the semi-finals (3–1 against Lam Dong). The team defeated Hanoi FC B 1-0 and won a direct ticket to the 2020 V.League 2. For the first time in the team's history, Ba Ria - Vung Tau attended a domestic professional tournament. In the Phase 1 of the 2020 V.League 2, they have top the league with 24 points after 11 games, but in Phase 2, they ranked 2nd and missed the chance to go to the 2021 V.League 1.

In the 2022 V.League 2, they have been top of the table for the first half, but dropped points in the second half and ranked 4th overall. In 2024, five of the team's players got prosecuted for betting, and suspicions of match fixing during the 1–3 V.League 2 defeat against SHB Da Nang that took place on 23 December 2023. On 14 May 2024, the club asked the provincial authority to not play in national competitions for the 2024–2025 season, citing financial concerns. However, they received a financial guarantee for another year and remained in the league.

=== Rename to Ho Chi Minh City FC ===
On 14 July 2025, the VFF announced its approval of the name change of Ba Ria - Vung Tau to Ho Chi Minh City FC.

== Kit suppliers and shirt sponsors ==
Stage	Manufacturer	Sponsor
2017–2018	none	(Thailand) SCG
2019	(South Korea) Zaicro	(Thailand) SCG
2020–2022	(Vietnam) Masu	(Thailand) SCG
2023	(Vietnam) VNS	(Thailand) SCG

== Current squad ==
As of 15 October 2026

Note: Flags indicate national team as defined under FIFA eligibility rules; some limited exceptions apply. Players may hold more than one non-FIFA nationality.

No.	Pos.	Nation	Player
1	GK	VIE	Nguyễn Thanh Thắng
2	DF	VIE	Nguyễn Thế Dũng
3	DF	VIE	Quan Huỳnh Thanh Quý
4	MF	VIE	Trịnh Quang Trường
5	DF	VIE	Lê Khả Đức (on loan from Công An HCMC)
6	DF	VIE	Đào Tấn Lộc
7	FW	USA	Zan Nguyen
8	MF	VIE	Ngô Hoàng Gia Huy
11	MF	VIE	Bùi Huy Hoàng
13	MF	VIE	Hồ Đức Tuấn
15	MF	VIE	Tô Phương Thịnh
16	DF	VIE	Trương Nhạc Minh
18	MF	VIE	Điểu Quy
19	MF	VIE	Nguyễn Quốc Hoàng

No.	Pos.	Nation	Player
20	FW	VIE	Nguyễn Công Thành
21	MF	VIE	Đậu Quang Hưng
23	MF	VIE	Võ Tuấn Phong
26	GK	VIE	Nguyễn Nhật Nguyên
28	GK	VIE	Trần Lâm Hào
29	MF	VIE	Nguyễn Hạ Long
35	DF	VIE	Nguyễn Hồng Quang
37	DF	VIE	Võ Ngọc Đức
39	DF	VIE	Vũ Đức Duy
42	DF	VIE	A Sân
91	FW	JAM	Jermie Lynch
93	FW	VIE	Hồ Sỹ Giáp
99	FW	VIE	Hoàng Minh Tuấn

== Coaching staff ==
As of 28 August 2026

Position	Name
Head coach	(Vietnam) Nguyễn Minh Phương
Assistant coach	(Vietnam) Lý Lâm Huy (Vietnam) Nguyễn Hải Anh
Goalkeeper coach	(Vietnam) Danh Hoàng Tuấn
Doctor	(Vietnam) Nguyễn Hữu Việt Trung (Vietnam) La Chí Kiên
Team manager	(Vietnam) Trương Hoàng Đoan Huy
