= Nguyễn Văn Đàn =

Vietnamese footballer (born 1974)

Personal information
- Date of birth: 30 July 1974 (age 52)
- Place of birth: Bình Định, South Vietnam
- Height: 1.70 m (5 ft 7 in)
- Position: Defender

Senior career*
Years	Team	Apps	(Gls)
2001–2010	Hoàng Anh Gia Lai		

International career
2004	Vietnam	5	(0)
- * Club domestic league appearances and goals

Nguyễn Văn Đàn (born 30 April 1974) is a Vietnamese former footballer and manager who is currently the head coach of V.League 2 club Quang Ninh.

== Career ==
He was born in Bình Định, but grew up in Gia Lai.

He played nine seasons for Hoàng Anh Gia Lai, during which he became V-League champion in 2003 and 2004.

He was capped five times for the Vietnam national team.

He took over as manager of Hoàng Anh Gia Lai in 2020, after Lee Tae-hoon was sacked. Serving together with Dương Minh Ninh, it was said to be the first instance of a V.League club having co-coaches, though Nguyễn Văn Đàn was described as "the person who makes the final decision".

== Personal life ==
He was known for his dyed hair.
