= Eddie Tran =

Swedish footballer (born 1997)

Personal information
- Full name: Li-Sheng Eddie Tran
- Date of birth: 11 June 1997 (age 29)
- Place of birth: Sweden
- Height: 1.72 m (5 ft 8 in)
- Position: Midfielder

Team information
- Current team: Bac Ninh
- Number: 10

Youth career
- –2012: Kulladals FF
- 2013–2014: BK Olympic

Senior career*
Years	Team	Apps	(Gls)
2015	BK Olympic	5	(0)
2016	FC Rosengård 1917	17	(1)
2017	Kvarnby IK	23	(2)
2018	Varbergs BoIS	11	(0)
2019	Kristianstad FC	27	(0)
2020	Torns IF	26	(2)
2021–2022	Lunds BK	58	(5)
2023	AFC Eskilstuna	0	(0)
2024–2025	Lunds BK	28	(0)
2025–	Bac Ninh	16	(1)
- * Club domestic league appearances and goals as of 12 June 2026

Li-Sheng Eddie Tran (born 11 June 1997) is a Swedish professional footballer who plays as a midfielder for V.League 2 club Bac Ninh.

== Career ==
=== Career in Sweden ===
Tran spent his youth career at BK Olympic before stepping up to senior football. In 2018, he joined Varbergs BoIS in the Superettan, Sweden's second-highest division. He then moved to Kristianstad FC in 2019 and Torns IF in 2020, competing in Division 1/Ettan, the third tier of Swedish football. During this period, he established himself as a reliable midfielder, gaining consistent playing time and experience.

His most notable spell in Sweden was with Lunds BK, which he joined in 2021. Over four seasons, Tran became a key figure in the team's midfield, making 92 league appearances and scoring 5 goals. Known for his vision, passing range, and composure on the ball, he was an integral part of the club's strategy in the Ettan league.

=== Bắc Ninh ===
In August 2025, Tran made the significant move to Vietnam, signing for V.League 2 side Bac Ninh. The transfer marked a new chapter in his career, as he left Europe to play in his country of heritage for the first time. He was unveiled as a marquee signing for the newly-promoted club, which has invested heavily in its squad with the stated goal of achieving promotion to V.League 1. He was given the number 10 shirt, signaling his importance to the team's creative and defensive plans in the midfield.

== Personal life ==
Tran was born and raised in Sweden. His parents are Hoa ethnic Vietnamese, giving him eligibility to represent Vietnam at the international level. His move to play professionally in Vietnam is seen as a step toward potentially being called up to the Vietnam national team.
