= Lê Thanh Phong =

Vietnamese footballer (born 1996)

Personal information
- Full name: Lê Thanh Phong
- Date of birth: 20 May 1996 (age 30)
- Place of birth: Tuy Phước, Bình Định, Vietnam
- Height: 1.73 m (5 ft 8 in)
- Position: Striker

Team information
- Current team: Quy Nhơn United
- Number: 77

Youth career
- 2008–2016: Bình Định

Senior career*
Years	Team	Apps	(Gls)
2016–2022	Bình Định	22	(6)
2022	→ Khánh Hòa (loan)	6	(0)
2023–2024	Long An	29	(15)
2024–	Quy Nhơn United	24	(11)
- * Club domestic league appearances and goals as of 23 October 2026

Lê Thanh Phong (born 20 May 1996) is a Vietnamese professional footballer who plays as a striker for V.League 2 club Quy Nhơn United.

== Club career ==
Born in Bình Định, Thanh Phong joined his hometown club Binh Dinh FC at the age of 12. He was promoted to the first team in 2015, and took part in the club's climbing from the Vietnamese Third League to V.League 1 between 2015 and 2020. In 2022, Thanh Phong was loaned to Khánh Hòa in the V.League 2 and won the league with the club despite having few game time.

In 2023, Thanh Phong remained in the V.League 2, being transferred to Long An. In the 2023–24 season, he scored 10 goals and finished as the second best scorer in the league.

In July 2024, Thanh Phong returned to his hometown club Quy Nhơn Bình Định.

== Honours ==
Bình Định

- V.League 2: 2020

Khánh Hòa

- V.League 2: 2022
