= Nguyễn Công Thành =

Vietnamese footballer

Personal information
- Full name: Nguyễn Công Thành
- Date of birth: 5 October 1997 (age 29)
- Place of birth: Tam Nông, Đồng Tháp, Vietnam
- Height: 1.82 m (6 ft 0 in)
- Position: Forward

Team information
- Current team: Hồ Chí Minh City
- Number: 20

Youth career
- 2009–2014: Đồng Tháp

Senior career*
Years	Team	Apps	(Gls)
2015–2020	Đồng Tháp	40	(17)
2021–2022	→ Hồ Chí Minh City (loan)	9	(0)
2023–2024	Đồng Tháp	27	(6)
2025–2026	Hồng Lĩnh Hà Tĩnh	1	(0)
2026–	Hồ Chí Minh City	22	(6)
- * Club domestic league appearances and goals as of 12 September 2026

Nguyễn Công Thành (born 5 October 1997) is a Vietnamese professional footballer who plays as a forward for V.League 2 club Hồ Chí Minh City.

Công Thành held the record as the youngest player to play in V.League 1 when he came on as a substitute for Đồng Tháp in the game against Cần Thơ on 10 January 2015, at 17 years old and 246 days. The record was broken by Trần Gia Bảo on 15 September 2024.
