= Nguyễn Thanh Hải =

Vietnamese footballer

Personal information
- Full name: Nguyễn Thanh Hải
- Date of birth: 26 November 1988 (age 37)
- Place of birth: Chợ Gạo, Tiền Giang, Vietnam
- Height: 1.65 m (5 ft 5 in)
- Position: Attacking midfielder

Youth career
- 2000–2010: Tiền Giang

Senior career*
Years	Team	Apps	(Gls)
2011–2015	Long An	50	(6)
2016–2021	SHB Đà Nẵng	102	(7)
2022–2023	Cần Thơ	17	(3)
2023	Gia Định		
2024–2025	Gia Định		
2025–2026	Long An	19	(2)

International career
2006–2009	Vietnam U-21	15	(1)
- * Club domestic league appearances and goals as of 6 June 2026

Nguyễn Thanh Hải (born 26 November 1988) is a Vietnamese professional footballer who last played as an attacking midfielder for V.League 2 club Long An.

In November 2026, Thanh Hải was arrested for match-fixing during a game with Long An in the 2025–26 V.League 2.
