= 2026–27 V.League 2 =

Vietnamese football tournament

V.League 2
- Season: 2026–27
- Dates: 11 September 2026 – 9 May 2027
- Matches: 56
- Goals: 157 (2.8 per match)
- Top goalscorer: Victor Mansaray (11 goals)
- Biggest home win: Hung Yen 8–1 Xuan Thien Phu Tho (10 October 2026)
- Biggest away win: Thep Can Tho 0–4 Thai Nguyen (8 November 2026)
- Highest scoring: Hung Yen 8–1 Xuan Thien Phu Tho (10 October 2026)
- Longest winning run: Thai Nguyen (4 game)
- Longest unbeaten run: Thai Nguyen; Hung Yen; Ho Chi Minh City FC (5 game)
- Longest winless run: Long An (8 game)
- Longest losing run: Xuan Thien Phu Tho (5 game)
- Highest attendance: 10,000; Thep Can Tho 0–3 Hung Yen (12 September 2026)
- Lowest attendance: 300; Xuan Thien Phu Tho 1–2 Becamex Ho Chi Minh City (31 October 2026)
- Total attendance: 110,800
- Average attendance: 2,280
- All statistics correct as of 22 November 2026.

The 2026–27 V.League 2 (Vietnamese: Giải bóng đá Hạng Nhất Quốc gia 2026/27, lit. 'National First Division Football League 2026/27'), also known as 2026–27 SACOMBANK V.League 2 for sponsorship reasons (Vietnamese: Giải bóng đá Hạng Nhất Quốc gia SACOMBANK 2026/27, lit. 'National SACOMBANK First Division Football League 2026/27') is the 15th season of the V.League 2 under its current title and the 27th season under its current league division format. The season began on 11 September 2026, and is scheduled to conclude on 9 May 2027. This is the first season following the expansion of the promotion and relegation spot from 1,5 to 2 and 1 to 2, respectively.

The fixtures were drawn and released on 6 August 2026 at 14:30 ICT.

== Teams ==
Locations of the 2026–27 V.League 2 teams
Locations of Ho Chi Minh City teams

=== Format changes ===
Starting from this season, V.League 2 has 14 teams.

=== Team changes ===
Promoted from 2026 Vietnamese Second Division	Relegated from 2025–26 V.League 1	Promoted to 2026–27 V.League 1	Relegated to 2027 Vietnamese Second Division
Hanoi FC B Hue; Lam Dong	Becamex Ho Chi Minh City; PVF-CAND	Truong Tuoi Dong Nai; Bac Ninh	Ho Chi Minh City Youth

=== Name changes ===
- On 1 August 2026, Hanoi FC B transferred their participation slot to Thai Nguyen.
- On 5 August 2026, PVF-CAND B transferred their participation slot to Hung Yen.
- On 13 August 2026, Dong Thap changed their name to Aurora Saigon United.
- On 25 August 2026, PVF-CAND changed their name to Cong An Nhan Dan.
- On 4 September 2026, Quang Ninh changed their name to Thep Can Tho.

=== Stadiums and locations ===
Team	Location	Stadium	Capacity	Previous season rank
Aurora Saigon United	Ho Chi Minh City	Thống Nhất	17,750	VL2 (10th)
Van Hien University	Ho Chi Minh City	Thống Nhất	17,750	VL2 (7th)
Becamex Ho Chi Minh City	Ho Chi Minh City	Bình Dương	13,035	▼VL1 (14th)
Ho Chi Minh City FC	Ho Chi Minh City	Bà Rịa	10,000	VL2 (3rd)
Hue	Hue	Tự Do	25,000	▲SD (playoffs)
Cong An Nhan Dan	Hung Yen	PVF	4,500	▼VL1 (13th)
Hung Yen	Hung Yen	PVF	4,500	VL2 (6th)
Khatoco Khanh Hoa	Khanh Hoa	19 August Nha Trang	18,000	VL2 (8th)
Lam Dong	Lam Dong	Đà Lạt	20,000	▲SD (playoffs)
Long An	Tay Ninh	Long An; Tây Ninh Province Sports Training and Competition Center No. 2 (Note: From 1 December 2026, due to administrative reasons, Long An changed their home stadium to the Tây Ninh Province Sports Training and Competition Center No. 2.)	20,000; 1,000	VL2 (11th)
Quy Nhon United	Gia Lai	Quy Nhơn	15,000	VL2 (4th)
Thai Nguyen	Thai Nguyen	Thái Nguyên	22,000	▲SD (playoffs)
Thep Can Tho	Can Tho	Cần Thơ	30,000	VL2 (9th)
Xuan Thien Phu Tho	Phu Tho	Việt Trì	20,000	VL2 (5th)

=== Number of teams by region ===
Number	Region	Team(s)
4	Red River Delta	Cong An Nhan Dan, Hung Yen, Thai Nguyen, Xuan Thien Phu Tho
4	Southeast	Becamex Ho Chi Minh City, Aurora Saigon United, Ho Chi Minh City FC and Van Hien University
3	South Central	Hue, Khatoco Khanh Hoa and Quy Nhon United
2	Mekong Delta	Long An and Can Tho
1	Central Highlands	Lam Dong

== Personnel and kits ==
All teams were obligated to have the logo of the league sponsor Sacombank on their left sleeve.

Note: Flags indicate national team as has been defined under FIFA eligibility rules. Players may hold more than one non-FIFA nationality.

Team	Manager	Captain	Kit manufacturer	Shirt sponsor(s)	
Team	Manager	Captain	Kit manufacturer	Main	Other(s)
Aurora Saigon United	(Vietnam) Ngô Quang Sang	(Vietnam) Bùi Ngọc Thịnh	(Vietnam) Wika	Văn Hiến University	List: Front: Wecode, Comoon, Ochao; Back: HAPPYFOOD, Nakydaco; Sleeves: None; Shorts: None
Becamex Ho Chi Minh City	(Spain) Gerard Albadalejo	(Vietnam) Võ Hoàng Minh Khoa	(Vietnam) Kamito	Becamex	List: Front: None; Back: None; Sleeves: None; Shorts: None
Cong An Nhan Dan	(Vietnam) Nguyễn Đức Thắng	(Vietnam) Nguyễn Đình Triệu	(Japan) Jogarbola	Công An Nhân Dân	List: Front: None; Back: None; Sleeves: None; Shorts: None
Ho Chi Minh City FC	(Vietnam) Nguyễn Minh Phương	(Vietnam) Nguyễn Thanh Thắng	(Vietnam) Wika	None	List: Front: None; Back: None; Sleeves: None; Shorts: None
Hue	(Vietnam) Lê Chí Nguyện	(Vietnam) Lê Viết Hiếu	(Vietnam) CR Sports	None	List: Front: None; Back: None; Sleeves: None; Shorts: None
Hung Yen	(Vietnam) Bùi Đoàn Quang Huy	(Vietnam) Huỳnh Tuấn Linh	(Vietnam) Wika	None	List: Front: None; Back: None; Sleeves: None; Shorts: None
Khatoco Khanh Hoa	(Vietnam) Võ Đình Tân	(Vietnam) Phạm Trùm Tỉnh	(Vietnam) Kamito	VietOstrich (H) / Khatoco (A) / Yang Bay (3rd)	List: Front: None; Back: Khatoco; Sleeves: None; Shorts: None
Lam Dong	(Vietnam) Trần Văn Toàn	(Vietnam) Phùng Khắc Nhất	(Vietnam) Demenino Sport	None	List: Front: None; Back: None; Sleeves: None; Shorts: None
Long An	(Vietnam) Huỳnh Ngọc San	(Vietnam) Nguyễn Tài Lộc	(Vietnam) Wika	None	List: Front: None; Back: Vietravel Airlines; Sleeves: None; Shorts: None
Quy Nhon United	(Vietnam) Hứa Hiền Vinh	(Vietnam) Nguyễn Thanh Thụ	(Vietnam) Kamito	MerryLand Quy Nhơn	List: Front: None; Back: None; Sleeves: None; Shorts: None
Thai Nguyen	(Vietnam) Phạm Minh Đức	(Uganda) Geoffrey Kizito	(Vietnam) Wika	None	List: Front: None; Back: None; Sleeves: None; Shorts: None
Thep Can Tho	(Vietnam) Nguyễn Văn Đàn	(Vietnam) Bùi Văn Hiếu	(Vietnam) Kamito	Xuân Thiện Group	List: Front: None; Back: None; Sleeves: None; Shorts: None
Van Hien University	(Vietnam) Hoàng Hải Dương	(Vietnam) Lương Quốc Thắng	(Vietnam) Made by club	Bình Minh Sài Gòn	List: Front: Au Lac-Hue Professional School, Maymay, Ecobook, Metik; Back: Ochao, HAPPYFOOD; Sleeves: None; Shorts: None
Xuan Thien Phu Tho	(Vietnam) Lê Quốc Vượng	(Vietnam) Trần Gia Huy	(Vietnam) Wika	Xuân Thiện Group	List: Front: None; Back: None; Sleeves: None; Shorts: None

=== Managerial changes ===
Team	Outgoing manager	Manner of departure	Date of vacancy	Position in the table	Incoming manager	Date of appointment
Becamex Ho Chi Minh City	(Vietnam) Hứa Hiền Vinh	Mutual consent	29 June 2026	Pre-season	(Spain) Gerard Albadalejo	29 June 2026
Khatoco Khanh Hoa	(Vietnam) Trần Trọng Bình	Joined Hanoi FC	3 July 2026	Pre-season	(Vietnam) Võ Đình Tân	3 July 2026
Cong An Nhan Dan	(Vietnam) Trần Tiến Đại	Mutual consent	13 July 2026	Pre-season	(Vietnam) Nguyễn Đức Thắng	7 August 2026
Quy Nhon United	(Vietnam) Trịnh Duy Quang	End of contract	14 July 2026	Pre-season	(Vietnam) Hứa Hiền Vinh	21 August 2026
Hung Yen	(Vietnam) Nguyễn Duy Đông	Mutual consent	5 August 2026	Pre-season	(Vietnam) Bùi Đoàn Quang Huy	27 August 2026
Long An	(Vietnam) Trịnh Văn Hậu	Mutual consent	27 October 2026	Pre-season	(Vietnam) Huỳnh Ngọc San	27 October 2026

== Foreign players ==
Teams can to register one foreign player and will be allotted two extra slot for 2 unnaturalized overseas Vietnamese player that will not be counted against their foreign player allotment.

Players name in bold indicates the player was registered after the start of the season.

Club	Player 1	Player 2 (Unnaturalized Vietnamese player)	Player 3 (Unnaturalized Vietnamese player)	Unregistred / Former players
Aurora Saigon United	(South Sudan) Dor Jok			
Becamex Ho Chi Minh City	(Brazil) Daniel dos Anjos			
Cong An Nhan Dan	(Brazil) Gonzalo	(Germany) Hong Lac Luong Thanh		
Ho Chi Minh City FC	(Jamaica) Jermie Lynch	(United States) Zan Nguyen		
Hue				
Hung Yen	(Trinidad and Tobago) Shaqkeem Joseph			
Khatoco Khanh Hoa	(Ukraine) Oleksandr Kurakin	(Denmark) Truong Quoc Minh		
Lam Dong				
Long An	(Brazil) Romário Alves			
Quy Nhon United	(Egypt) Alexander Jakobsen			
Thai Nguyen	(United States) Victor Mansaray			
Thep Can Tho	(Brazil) Tháileon			
Van Hien University	(Denmark) Namli Ilias			
Xuan Thien Phu Tho	(Cameroon) Richmond Nji	(Republic of Ireland) Brandon Ly		

=== Dual nationality Vietnamese players ===
- Players name in **bold** indicates the player was registered after the start of the season.
- Player's name in italics indicates Overseas Vietnamese players whom have obtained a Vietnamese passport and citizenship, therefore being considered as local players.

Club	Player 1	Player 2	Player 3
Aurora Saigon United			
Becamex Ho Chi Minh City	(Germany) (Vietnam) Bùi Đức Duy^{1}	(Nigeria) (Vietnam) Hoàng Vũ Samson	
Cong An Nhan Dan	(Brazil) (Vietnam) Đỗ Phi Long	(Russia) (Vietnam) Lê Viktor	(Russia) (Vietnam) Nguyễn Vadim
Ho Chi Minh City FC	(France) (Vietnam) A Sân		
Hue			
Hung Yen	(Czech Republic) (Vietnam) Dương Thanh Tùng	(Czech Republic) (Vietnam) Mạc Hồng Quân^{1}	
Khatoco Khanh Hoa	(Czech Republic) (Vietnam) Hoàng Minh Kiên		
Lam Dong			
Long An	(France) (Vietnam) Tiêu Ê Xal		
Thep Can Tho			
Quy Nhon United			
Thai Nguyen	(Uganda) (Vietnam) Trần Trung Hiếu		
Van Hien University			
Xuan Thien Phu Tho	(Canada) (Vietnam) Trần Khánh Hưng		

Notes:

^{1} Capped for Vietnam national team.
^{2} Player is under the process of Vietnamese naturalization, thus is not counted as a foreign player slot.

== League table ==
Pos	Team	Pld	W	D	L	GF	GA	GD	Pts	Promotion or relegation
1	Becamex Ho Chi Minh City	8	6	1	1	19	6	+13	19	Promotion to V.League 1
2	Hung Yen	8	5	2	1	23	7	+16	17	Promotion to V.League 1
3	Thai Nguyen	8	5	1	2	17	8	+9	16	
4	Ho Chi Minh City FC	8	5	1	2	11	6	+5	16	
5	Aurora Saigon United	8	5	1	2	13	9	+4	16	
6	Cong An Nhan Dan	8	4	1	3	11	12	−1	13	
7	Khatoco Khanh Hoa	8	3	3	2	11	9	+2	12	
8	Van Hien University	8	3	2	3	8	9	−1	11	
9	Quy Nhon United	8	2	3	3	10	9	+1	9	
10	Thep Can Tho	8	2	2	4	6	14	−8	8	
11	Xuan Thien Phu Tho	8	1	2	5	9	22	−13	5	
12	Hue	8	1	2	5	7	20	−13	5	
13	Long An	8	0	4	4	6	11	−5	4	Relegation to Vietnamese Second Division
14	Lam Dong	8	1	1	6	6	15	−9	4	Relegation to Vietnamese Second Division

Updated to match(es) played on 22 November 2026. Source: VPF
Rules for classification: 1) Points; 2) Head-to-head points; 3) Head-to-head goal difference; 4) Head-to-head goals scored; 5) Goal difference; 6) Goals scored; 7) Away goals scored; 8) Fair-play points.

== Results ==
Home \ Away	ASU	BHC	CAD	HCM	HUE	HYE	KHA	LDO	LAN	QNU	TNG	TCT	VHU	XPT
Aurora Saigon United	—									3–1	0–3			
Becamex Ho Chi Minh City		—	1–0		5–0			3–1			2–3	4–0		
Cong An Nhan Dan			—	0–1		1–1			2–1			2–1		
Ho Chi Minh City FC		1–2		—						2–1	1–0		0–1	3–0
Hue	0–2			2–2	—		1–2							
Hung Yen					4–1	—			3–1	0–0				8–1
Khatoco Khanh Hoa	0–1		4–1			1–3	—					1–1		
Lam Dong	0–2		1–2	0–1			1–1	—					3–0	
Long An	1–1						0–1		—		1–1	0–0		
Quy Nhon United					1–1			4–0	0–0	—				
Thai Nguyen					4–1					2–1	—		0–2	
Thep Can Tho						0–3		2–0			0–4	—		2–0
Van Hien University	3–2	0–0			0–1					1–2			—	1–1
Xuan Thien Phu Tho		1–2	2–3				1–1		3–2					—

Updated to match(es) played on 22 November 2026. Source: VPF
Legend: Blue = home team win; Yellow = draw; Red = away team win.

=== Position by round ===
Team ╲ Round	1	2	3	4	5	6	7	8	9	10	11	12	13	14	15	16	17	18	19	20	21	22	23	24	25	26
Becamex Ho Chi Minh City	8	4	4	4	3	2	2	1																		
Cong An Nhan Dan	3	8	8	5	4	8	8	6																		
Ho Chi Minh City FC	5	6	10	10	8	7	4	4																		
Quy Nhon United	11	9	12	9	10	10	10	9																		
Xuan Thien Phu Tho	7	13	14	14	14	14	14	11																		
Hung Yen	1	1	2	2	1	1	3	2																		
Van Hien University	9	5	7	6	7	6	7	8																		
Khatoco Khanh Hoa	6	3	3	3	6	5	6	7																		
Thep Can Tho	14	12	6	8	9	9	9	10																		
Aurora Saigon United	2	7	5	7	5	4	5	5																		
Long An	12	10	11	13	12	11	12	13																		
Thai Nguyen	4	2	1	1	2	3	1	3																		
Hue	13	11	13	12	13	13	11	12																		
Lam Dong	10	14	9	11	11	12	13	14																		

Promotion to V.League 1
Promotion to V.League 1
Relegation to Vietnamese Second Division

Source: VPF

== Season statistics ==
As of 22 November 2026

=== Top scorers ===
Rank	Player	Club	Goals
1	(United States) Victor Mansaray	Thai Nguyen	11
2	(Trinidad and Tobago) Shaqkeem Joseph	Hung Yen	8
3	(Brazil) Daniel dos Anjos	Becamex Ho Chi Minh City	6
4	(Ukraine) Oleksandr Kurakin	Khatoco Khanh Hoa	5
5	(Vietnam) Nguyễn Trần Việt Cường	Becamex Ho Chi Minh City	4
6	(Vietnam) Lê Minh Bình	Hung Yen	3
6	(Vietnam) Trần Gia Huy	Xuan Thien Phu Tho	3
6	(Vietnam) Nguyễn Công Thành	Ho Chi Minh City FC	3
6	(Vietnam) Cao Quốc Khánh	Aurora Saigon United	3
6	(Denmark) Namli Ilias	Van Hien University	3
6	(Vietnam) Vũ Minh Hiếu	Hung Yen	3
6	(Brazil) Gonzalo Fornari	Cong An Nhan Dan	3
13	(Vietnam) Nguyễn Trọng Đức Vũ	Hung Yen	2
13	(Vietnam) Nguyễn Hoàng Anh	Cong An Nhan Dan	2
13	(Vietnam) Nguyễn Hữu Lâm	Aurora Saigon United	2
13	(Vietnam) Nguyễn Tuấn Em	Aurora Saigon United	2
13	(Vietnam) Nguyễn Xuân Nam	Lam Dong	2
13	(Brazil) Gustavo	Cong An Nhan Dan	2
13	(Egypt) Alexander Jakobsen	Quy Nhon United	2
13	(Vietnam) Đào Gia Việt	Quy Nhon United	2
13	(Vietnam) Trịnh Long Vũ	Quy Nhon United	2
13	(Vietnam) Lê Thanh Phong	Quy Nhon United	2
13	(Jamaica) Jermie Lynch	Ho Chi Minh City FC	2
13	(Vietnam) Trần Đình Tiến	Cong An Nhan Dan	2
13	(Vietnam) Bùi Văn Bình	Becamex Ho Chi Minh City	2
13	(Vietnam) Nguyễn Đăng Dương	Hung Yen	2
13	(Vietnam) Dương Anh Vũ	Hue	2
13	(Brazil) Tháileon	Thep Can Tho	2
13	(Denmark) Truong Quoc Minh	Khatoco Khanh Hoa	2
13	(Vietnam) Hoàng Công Hậu	Hue	2
13	(Brazil) Romário Alves	Long An	2
13	(Vietnam) Bùi Huy Hoàng	Ho Chi Minh City FC	2
13	(Vietnam) Nguyễn Trung Thành	Thai Nguyen	2
13	(Vietnam) Nguyễn Đình Thịnh	Thai Nguyen	2
13	(Republic of Ireland) Brandon Ly	Xuan Thien Phu Tho	2
13	(Vietnam) Hà Vũ Em	Long An	2

==== Hat-tricks ====
Player	For	Against	Result	Date
(United States) Victor Mansaray	Thai Nguyen	Aurora Saigon United	3–0 (A)	27 September 2026

=== Clean sheets ===
Rank	Player	Club	Clean sheets
1	(Vietnam) Nguyễn Thanh Thắng	Ho Chi Minh City FC	4
1	(Vietnam) Trần Minh Toàn	Becamex Ho Chi Minh City	4
3	(Vietnam) Dương Văn Cường	Thep Can Tho	3
3	(Vietnam) Nguyễn Thanh Tuấn	Van Hien University	3
3	(Vietnam) Võ Văn Sơn	Quy Nhon United	3
3	(Vietnam) Nguyễn Quang Trường	Aurora Saigon United	3
7	(Vietnam) Nguyễn Mạnh Cường	Long An	2
7	(Vietnam) Phan Đình Vũ Hải	Thai Nguyen	2
7	(Vietnam) Huỳnh Tuấn Linh	Hung Yen	2
10	(Vietnam) Nguyễn Thanh Phú	Lam Dong	1
10	(Vietnam) Võ Ngọc Cường	Khatoco Khanh Hoa	1
10	(Vietnam) Võ Đức Bảo	Hue	1
