= 2021 Vietnamese Football League Second Division =

Vietnamese Football League Second Division
- Season: 2021
- Dates: 4 May 2021 (cancelled)
- Matches: 5
- Goals: 10 (2 per match)
- Top goalscorer: Nguyễn Duy Khánh (2 goals)
- Biggest home win: Lam Dong 4–1 Kon Tum (4 May 2021)
- All statistics correct as of 9 June 2021.

The 2021 Vietnamese Football League Second Division, known as the Asanzo Cup Second Division for sponsorship reasons, was the 22nd season of the Vietnamese Football League Second Division. The season began on 4 May 2021.

On 21 August 2021, VFF had an online meeting with representatives of clubs to determine the 'fate' of professional tournaments in 2021 and finally came to the result of canceling all competition in the year, including the Second Division.

== Competition format ==
14 teams will compete in the 2021 season, split into two equal groups of 7 each. The top two teams from each group will qualify for the final stage. The two teams wins the 2 final stage matches will gain promotion to 2022 V.League 2. The team with the fewest points among the 2 groups in the group stage will be relegated to the 2022 Vietnamese Football League Third Division.

== Teams ==
=== Stadium and locations ===
Locations of the 2021 League Two teams

Note: Table lists in alphabetical order.

Team	Location	Stadium	Capacity
Binh Thuan	Phan Thiet	Phan Thiet	6,000
Dong Nai	Bien Hoa	Dong Nai	20,000
Dong Thap	Cao Lanh	Cao Lãnh	20,000
Gia Dinh	Ho Chi Minh City (Hoc Mon)	Tan Hiep	TBD
Hai Nam Vinh Yen VP	Tam Dao	Tam Dao	
Hoa Binh	Hoa Binh	Hoa Binh	
Ho Chi Minh City Youth	Ho Chi Minh City (District 10)	Thong Nhat	16,000
Kon Tum	Kon Tum	Kon Tum	15,000
Lam Dong	Da Lat	Lam Dong	2,000
PVF	Hung Yen	PVF	4,500
Quang Nam B	Nui Thanh	Nui Thanh	
SHB Da Nang B	Da Nang (Cam Le)	Hoa Xuan	20,000
Tien Giang	My Tho	Tien Giang	10,000
Vinh Long	Vinh Long	Vinh Long	10,000

=== Number of teams by region ===
Number	Region	Team(s)
3	Mekong Delta	Dong Thap, Tien Giang, and Vinh Long
3	South Central	Binh Thuan, Quang Nam B and SHB Da Nang B
3	Southeast	Dong Nai, Gia Dinh and Ho Chi Minh City Youth
2	Central Highlands	Kon Tum and Lam Dong
2	Red River Delta	Hai Nam Vinh Yen VP and PVF
1	Northwest	Hoa Binh

== Personnel and kits ==
Note: Flags indicate national team as has been defined under FIFA eligibility rules. Players may hold more than one non-FIFA nationality.

Team	Manager	Kit manufacturer	Shirt sponsor
Hoa Binh	Lê Quốc Vượng	Kamito	Next Media
SHB Da Nang B	Võ Phước	Kamito	SHB
Lam Dong	Nguyễn Mạnh Quý	Donexpro	
Quang Nam B	Đặng Đức Nhật	Mitre	
PVF	Mauro Jeronimo	Kelme	
Ho Chi Minh City Youth			
Dong Thap	Nguyễn Anh Tống	Grand Sport	Van Hien University, Ochao
Tien Giang	Nguyễn Kim Hằng		
Vinh Long	Nguyễn Minh Cảnh	Kelme	
Binh Thuan	Đào Thanh Sơn		
Kon Tum	Hồ Mạnh Cường		
Hai Nam Vinh Yen VP	Đào Việt Hà		
Dong Nai	Hoàng Hải Dương		
Gia Dinh	Huỳnh Nhật Thanh	Demenino Sport	Kenos

== Group stage ==
=== Group A ===
==== Table ====
Pos	Team	Pld	W	D	L	GF	GA	GD	Pts
1	Lam Dong	1	1	0	0	4	1	+3	3
2	Hai Nam Vinh Yen VP	1	0	1	0	0	0	0	1
3	Hoa Binh	1	0	1	0	0	0	0	1
4	PVF	0	0	0	0	0	0	0	0
5	Quang Nam B	0	0	0	0	0	0	0	0
6	SHB Da Nang B	0	0	0	0	0	0	0	0
7	Kon Tum	1	0	0	1	1	4	−3	0

Updated to match(es) played on 4 May 2021. Source: VFF
Rules for classification: 1) Points; 2) Goal difference; 3) Goals scored

==== Results ====
Home \ Away	HVP	HBI	KON	LDO	PVF	QNR	SDR
Hai Nam Vinh Yen VP							
Hoa Binh	0–0						
Kon Tum							
Lam Dong			4–1				
PVF							
Quang Nam B							
SHB Da Nang B					CAN	CAN	

Updated to match(es) played on 4 May 2021. Source: VFF
Legend: Blue = home team win; Yellow = draw; Red = away team win.

=== Group B ===
==== Table ====
Pos	Team	Pld	W	D	L	GF	GA	GD	Pts
1	Tien Giang	1	1	0	0	1	0	+1	3
2	Binh Thuan	1	0	1	0	1	1	0	1
3	Gia Dinh	1	0	1	0	1	1	0	1
4	Dong Nai	1	0	1	0	1	1	0	1
5	Ho Chi Minh City Youth	1	0	1	0	1	1	0	1
6	Dong Thap	0	0	0	0	0	0	0	0
7	Vinh Long	1	0	0	1	0	1	−1	0

Updated to match(es) played on 4 May 2021. Source: VFF
Rules for classification: 1) Points; 2) Goal difference; 3) Goals scored

==== Results ====
Home \ Away	BTH	DNA	DOT	GDI	HCR	TGI	VLO
Binh Thuan							
Dong Nai				1–1			
Dong Thap							
Gia Dinh							
Ho Chi Minh City Youth	1–1						
Tien Giang							1–0
Vinh Long							

Updated to match(es) played on 4 May 2021. Source: VFF
Legend: Blue = home team win; Yellow = draw; Red = away team win.

=== Ranking of last-placed teams ===
Pos	Grp	Team	Pld	W	D	L	GF	GA	GD	Pts
1	B	Vinh Long	1	0	0	1	0	1	−1	0
2	A	Kon Tum	1	0	0	1	1	4	−3	0

Updated to match(es) played on July 2021. Source:
Rules for classification: 1) Points; 2) Goal difference; 3) Goals scored
