= 2022 Vietnamese Football League Second Division =

Vietnamese Football League Second Division
- Season: 2022
- Dates: 18 April - 8 June 2022
- Promoted: Binh Thuan; Hoa Binh
- Relegated: Kon Tum
- Matches: 84
- Goals: 199 (2.37 per match)
- Top goalscorer: Nguyễn Văn Tùng (7 goals)
- All statistics correct as of 9 June 2022.

The 2022 Vietnamese Football League Second Division, known as the ALPHA Cup Second Division for sponsorship reasons, was the 23rd season of the Vietnamese Football League Second Division. The regular season began on 18 April and ended on 3 June. The final stage was played on 8 May, with Binh Thuan and Hoa Binh gaining promotion to the 2023 V.League 2.

== Teams ==
=== Stadium and locations ===
Locations of the 2022 League Two teams

Note: Table lists in alphabetical order.

Team	Location	Stadium	Capacity
Binh Thuan	Phan Thiet	Phan Thiet	6,000
Dong Nai	Bien Hoa	Dong Nai	20,000
Dong Thap	Cao Lanh	Cao Lãnh	20,000
Gia Dinh	Ho Chi Minh City (Hoc Mon)	Tan Hiep	TBD
Hai Nam Vinh Yen VP	Tam Dao	Tam Dao	
Hoa Binh	Hoa Binh	Hoa Binh	
Ho Chi Minh City Youth	Ho Chi Minh City (District 10)	Thong Nhat	16,000
Kon Tum	Kon Tum	Kon Tum	15,000
Lam Dong	Da Lat	Lam Dong	2,000
PVF	Hung Yen	PVF	4,500
Quang Nam B	Nui Thanh	Nui Thanh	
SHB Da Nang B	Da Nang (Cam Le)	Hoa Xuan	20,000
Tien Giang	My Tho	Tien Giang	10,000
Vinh Long	Vinh Long	Vinh Long	10,000

=== Number of teams by region ===
Number	Region	Team(s)
3	Mekong Delta	Dong Thap, Tien Giang, and Vinh Long
3	South Central	Binh Thuan, Quang Nam U23 and SHB Da Nang U23
3	Southeast	Dong Nai, Gia Dinh and Ho Chi Minh City U23
2	Central Highlands	Kon Tum and Lam Dong
2	Red River Delta	Hai Nam Vinh Yen VP and PVF
1	Northwest	Hoa Binh

== Personnel and kits ==
Note: Flags indicate national team as has been defined under FIFA eligibility rules. Players may hold more than one non-FIFA nationality.

Team	Manager	Kit manufacturer	Shirt sponsor
Binh Thuan	Đào Thanh Sơn	Just Play	
Dong Nai	Hoàng Hải Dương	Demenino Sport	Bao Nguyen Electric Co
Dong Thap	Phan Thanh Bình	Grand Sport	Van Hien University, Ochao
Gia Dinh	Huỳnh Nhật Thanh	Demenino Sport	Kenos
Hai Nam Vinh Yen VP	Dao Viet Ha		
Hoa Binh	Lê Quốc Vượng	Kamito	Next Media
Ho Chi Minh City Youth			
Kon Tum	Hồ Mạnh Cường	Keep & Fly	
Lam Dong	Hứa Hiền Vinh	Egan	Central Capital
PVF	Lê Quang Trãi	Kelme	Van Lang University
Quang Nam B	Đặng Đức Nhật	Kamito	
SHB Da Nang B	Võ Phước	Kamito	SHB
Tien Giang	Đỗ Văn Minh		
Vinh Long	Nguyễn Minh Cảnh	Kelme	

== Group stage ==
=== Group A ===
==== Table ====
Pos	Team	Pld	W	D	L	GF	GA	GD	Pts	Qualification or relegation
1	Hai Nam Vinh Yen VP (Q)	12	7	3	2	10	5	+5	24	Qualification to Final stage
2	Hoa Binh (Q)	12	6	5	1	24	7	+17	23	Qualification to Final stage
3	Lam Dong	12	6	5	1	19	8	+11	23	
4	Quang Nam B	12	5	2	5	20	17	+3	17	
5	SHB Da Nang B	12	3	5	4	10	13	−3	14	
6	PVF	12	1	4	7	8	19	−11	7	
7	Kon Tum (R)	12	0	4	8	2	24	−22	4	Relegation to Vietnamese Third Division

Updated to match(es) played on 3 June 2022. Source: VFF
Rules for classification: 1) Points; 2) Goal difference; 3) Goals scored
(Q) Qualified for the phase indicated; (R) Relegated

==== Results ====
Home \ Away	HVP	HBH	KON	LDO	PVF	QNM	SDN
Hai Nam Vinh Yen VP		0–0	1–0	0–1	1–0	0–2	1–1
Hoa Binh	0–1		4–0	2–2	2–0	3–2	0–0
Kon Tum	0–2	0–4		0–4	0–0	0–2	0–3
Lam Dong	0–1	0–0	1–1		1–1	2–2	2–1
PVF	1–2	0–4	1–1	0–1		1–0	1–2
Quang Nam B	0–1	2–2	2–0	0–4	4–2		3–0
SHB Da Nang B	0–0	0–3	0–0	0–1	1–1	2–1	

Updated to match(es) played on 3 June 2022. Source: VFF
Legend: Blue = home team win; Yellow = draw; Red = away team win.

=== Group B ===
==== Table ====
Pos	Team	Pld	W	D	L	GF	GA	GD	Pts	Qualification or relegation
1	Dong Nai (Q)	12	8	1	3	19	6	+13	25	Qualification to Final stage
2	Binh Thuan (Q)	12	7	2	3	16	10	+6	23	Qualification to Final stage
3	Gia Dinh	12	6	3	3	23	16	+7	21	
4	Dong Thap	12	4	4	4	10	10	0	16	
5	Tien Giang	12	3	3	6	15	22	−7	12	
6	Vinh Long	12	3	2	7	9	17	−8	11	
7	Ho Chi Minh City Youth	12	3	1	8	14	25	−11	10	

Updated to match(es) played on 3 June 2022. Source: VFF
Rules for classification: 1) Points; 2) Goal difference; 3) Goals scored
(Q) Qualified for the phase indicated

==== Results ====
Home \ Away	BTH	DNA	DOT	GDI	HCM	TGI	VLO
Binh Thuan		2–0	1–0	1–1	2–0	2–0	1–1
Dong Nai	3–0		2–0	2–1	4–0	0–0	2–0
Dong Thap	2–1	0–1		2–1	1–2	0–0	0–0
Gia Dinh	3–2	1–0	1–1		1–6	5–1	3–0
Ho Chi Minh City Youth	0–2	2–1	0–0	0–4		2–3	1–2
Tien Giang	0–1	0–2	1–3	1–1	4–1		4–2
Vinh Long	0–1	0–2	0–1	0–1	1–0	3–1	

Updated to match(es) played on 3 June 2022. Source: VFF
Legend: Blue = home team win; Yellow = draw; Red = away team win.

=== Ranking of last-placed teams ===
Pos	Grp	Team	Pld	W	D	L	GF	GA	GD	Pts	Relegation
1	B	Ho Chi Minh City Reserves	12	3	1	8	14	25	−11	10	
2	A	Kon Tum (R)	12	0	4	8	2	24	−22	4	Relegation to Vietnamese League Three

Updated to match(es) played on 15 May 2022. Source:
Rules for classification: 1) Points; 2) Goal difference; 3) Goals scored
(R) Relegated

== Final stage ==
8 June 2022
15:00

Hai Nam Vinh Yen VP	2–2	Binh Thuan
Le The Cuong 5'; Nguyen Van Vinh 29'	Report	Nguyen Dinh Loi 55'; Nguyen Thanh Hung 77'
Penalties
Penalty scored Penalty missed	7–8	Penalty scored

Nha Trang Stadium, Nha Trang
Referee: Tran Ngoc Nho
8 June 2022
18:00

Dong Nai	0–3	Hoa Binh
	Report	Le Ngoc Trong 10'; Nguyen Van Tung 45+1'; Nguyen Nam Truong 81'

Nha Trang Stadium, Nha Trang
Referee: Le Vu Linh

Binh Thuan and Hoa Binh are promoted to V. League 2.
