= Trần Gia Huy =

Vietnamese footballer

Personal information
- Full name: Trần Gia Huy
- Date of birth: 3 November 2003 (age 22)
- Place of birth: Thanh Hóa, Vietnam
- Height: 1.75 m (5 ft 9 in)
- Position: Winger

Team information
- Current team: Xuân Thiện Phú Thọ
- Number: 68

Youth career
- 2013–2020: Hoàng Anh Gia Lai
- 2020–2022: Nutifood

Senior career*
Years	Team	Apps	(Gls)
2022	Nutifood		
2023	Hòa Bình	21	(5)
2024	Phú Thọ	4	(0)
2024–2025	Hòa Bình	19	(2)
2025–2026	Hoàng Anh Gia Lai	3	(0)
2026–	Xuân Thiện Phú Thọ	18	(8)
- * Club domestic league appearances and goals as of 28 October 2026

Trần Gia Huy (born 3 November 2003) is a Vietnamese professional footballer who plays as a winger for V.League 2 club Xuân Thiện Phú Thọ.

== Early career ==
Born in Thanh Hóa, Gia Huy joined the Hoàng Anh Gia Lai JMG academy in 2013. At that time, he attracted attention from the local media due to his height of 1.28 metres at the age of 10. He was diagnosed with malnutrition, rickets, and delayed growth. Subsequently, over the course of five years, he underwent growth hormone therapy and achieved normal growth.

== Club career ==
After graduating from Nutifood, Gia Huy went on trial at V.League 1 club Thanh Hóa but was not kept by the team. He returned to Nutifood and played in the 2022 Vietnamese Second Division, before getting signed by V.League 2 side Hòa Bình. After one year at the team, he was released by team, and joined Phú Thọ.

In summer 2024, Gia Huy re-signed for Hòa Bình on a one-year deal and was named team captain for the 2024–25 season.

On 29 July 2025, Gia Huy returned to his boyhood Hoàng Anh Gia Lai in the V.League 1. In January 2026, Gia Huy signed for Xuân Thiện Phú Thọ.

== Personal life ==
He is given the nickname "Siêu nhân" (Superman) by Vietnamese press.
