= Nguyễn Gia Bảo =

Vietnamese footballer (born 2005)

Personal information
- Full name: Nguyễn Gia Bảo
- Date of birth: 7 January 2005 (age 21)
- Place of birth: Sóc Trăng, Vietnam
- Height: 1.70 m (5 ft 7 in)
- Positions: Winger; attacking midfielder

Team information
- Current team: Hưng Yên
- Number: 13

Youth career
- 2014–2023: PVF

Senior career*
Years	Team	Apps	(Gls)
2023–2025	PVF		
2023–2024	→ Hòa Bình (loan)	15	(0)
2025–	Hưng Yên	19	(0)

International career^{‡}
2024	Vietnam U20	5	(0)
- * Club domestic league appearances and goals as of 6 June 2026 ‡ National team caps and goals as of 29 September 2024

Nguyễn Gia Bảo (born 7 January 2005) is a Vietnamese professional footballer who plays as a winger or attacking midfielder for V.League 2 club Hưng Yên.

== Early career ==
Born in Sóc Trăng, Gia Bảo joined PVF Football Academy in 2014 after being chosen during the club's try out session in Southern Vietnam. In the 2018 Vietnamese National U-13 Championship, he was name as the captain of PVF under-13s and led his team finish as runners-up. As the result, he was given the "Best player of the tournament" award.

In 2023, he netted 4 goals during the Vietnamese National U-21 Championship, as his team manage to win the title for the first time in the history. He was therefore the joint top scorer of the tournament.

== Club career ==
In October 2023, Gia Bảo signed for V.League 2 side Hòa Bình on loan.

== Honours ==
Individual

- Vietnamese National U-21 Championship top scorer: 2023
