= Vũ Minh Hiếu (footballer, born 2002) =

Vietnamese footballer (born 2002)

Personal information
- Full name: Vũ Minh Hiếu
- Date of birth: 10 February 2002 (age 24)
- Place of birth: Hậu Lộc, Thanh Hóa, Vietnam
- Height: 1.81 m (5 ft 11 in)
- Position: Striker

Team information
- Current team: Hưng Yên
- Number: 9

Youth career
- Thanh Hóa
- –2020: Hoàng Anh Gia Lai

Senior career*
Years	Team	Apps	(Gls)
2020–2025	Hoàng Anh Gia Lai	1	(0)
2021–2022	→ Đòng Tháp (loan)	3	(0)
2021	→ Bình Thuận (loan)		
2022–2023	→ Hải Phòng (loan)	2	(0)
2023	→ Cheonan City (loan)	0	(0)
2024	→ LPBank Ho Chi Minh City (loan)		
2025	→ Long An (loan)	13	(3)
2025–2026	Xuân Thiện Phú Thọ	20	(2)
2026–	Hưng Yên	0	(0)

International career
2022	Vietnam U23	1	(0)
- * Club domestic league appearances and goals as of 6 June 2026

Vũ Minh Hiếu (born 10 February 2002) is a Vietnamese professional footballer who plays as a striker for V.League 2 club Hưng Yên.

== Club career ==
Born in Thanh Hóa, Minh Hiếu started playing football at an early age for the Thanh Hóa FC youth team before quitting as his father initially wanted him to pursue a military career. In 2020, he decided to continue his football career and joined HAGL. He was considered a prospect and was promoted to the first team at the age of 18.

On 31 January 2023, Minh Hiếu signed for K League 2 club Cheonan City on loan.

In March 2024, Minh Hiếu was loaned to Vietnamese third tier club LPBank Ho Chi Minh City.

In August 2026, Minh Hiếu moved to V.League 2 club Hưng Yên.

== International career ==
Minh Hiếu was named in the Vietnam under-23 preliminary squad for the 2023 AFF U-23 Championship, but wasn't included in the final list.

== Style of play ==
Minh Hiếu mainly operates as a striker and is known for his shooting ability.
