= Mạc Đức Việt Anh =

Vietnamese footballer (born 1997)

Personal information
- Full name: Mạc Đức Việt Anh
- Date of birth: August 22, 1997 (age 29)
- Place of birth: Gia Lộc, Hải Dương, Vietnam
- Height: 1.74 m (5 ft 9 in)
- Position: Center back

Team information
- Current team: Hưng Yên
- Number: 34

Youth career
- 2011–2015: PVF Football Academy

Senior career*
Years	Team	Apps	(Gls)
2016	→ Than Quảng Ninh (loan)	18	(0)
2017–2021	SHB Đà Nẵng	18	(0)
2021	→ Phố Hiến (loan)	7	(0)
2022–2024	Quảng Nam	40	(3)
2024–2025	Trường Tươi Bình Phước	5	(0)
2025–	Hưng Yên	6	(0)

International career
2015–2016	Vietnam U19	1	(0)
- * Club domestic league appearances and goals as of 6 June 2026

Mạc Đức Việt Anh (born 22 August 1997) is a Vietnamese professional footballer who plays as a center back for V.League 2 club Hưng Yên.

== Honours ==
Quảng Nam

- V.League 2: 2023
