= Dương Văn Hào =

Vietnamese footballer (born 1997)

Personal information
- Full name: Dương Văn Hào
- Date of birth: 15 February 1997 (age 29)
- Place of birth: Phú Lương, Thái Nguyên, Vietnam
- Height: 1.77 m (5 ft 10 in)
- Positions: Winger; right back

Team information
- Current team: Thái Nguyên
- Number: 20

Youth career
- 2006–2012: Thái Nguyên
- 2012–2015: Viettel

Senior career*
Years	Team	Apps	(Gls)
2016–2025	Thể Công-Viettel	85	(12)
2025–2026	Công An Hồ Chí Minh City	2	(0)
2026–	Thái Nguyên	7	(1)

International career^{‡}
2015–2017	Vietnam U20	14	(0)
- * Club domestic league appearances and goals as of 8 November 2026 ‡ National team caps and goals as of 10 October 2023

Dương Văn Hào (born 15 February 1997) is a Vietnamese footballer who plays as a winger and right back for V.League 2 club Thái Nguyên.

== Early career ==
Born in Thái Nguyên, Văn Hào was recruited to the Thái Nguyên youth academy in 2006, a satelitte team of Hanoi ACB. In 2012, after Hanoi ACB ceased its operations, he joined the Viettel youth academy.

== Club career ==
Văn Hào was promoted to Viettel first team for the 2016 V.League 2 season. He was a regular starter and scored 6 goals during the season, helping his team finish runner-up in the league.

On 4 May 2018, during a V.League 2 game, he suffered from a broken ankle injury after a tackle from Huỳnh Tấn Tài. He had go through surgeries had his left ankle pinned for the rest of his life. Văn Hào was speculated by the doctors to have to retire after this serious injury, but miraculously returned playing on 15 March 2020 in a V.League 1 match against Hoàng Anh Gia Lai.

In August 2025, Văn Hào joined V.League 1 fellow Công An Hồ Chí Minh City.

In August 2026, Văn Hào joined V.League 2 fellow Thái Nguyên

== International career ==
Due to his versatility, Văn Hào was an important member of the Vietnam under 19s during the 2016 AFC U-19 Championship, playing a big role in Vietnam's entrance to the semi-final, which qualified the team for the 2017 FIFA U-20 World Cup.

Therefore, he was part of the Vietnam U20 squad that participated in the 2017 FIFA U-20 World Cup. He appeared in all 3 group stage matches as Vietnam failed to reach the knockout stage.

In August 2023, he received his first call up to the Vietnam national team on a training camp to prepare for the friendly game against Palestine.

== Honours ==
Viettel

- V.League 1: 2020
- V.League 2: 2018
- Vietnamese National Cup runners up: 2020, 2023
- Vietnamese Super Cup runners-up: 2020

Công An Hồ Chí Minh City

- Vietnamese National Cup: 2025–26

Vietnam U19

- AFF U-19 Youth Championship runners-up: 2014, 2015
