= Ngô Xuân Sơn =

Vietnamese footballer

Personal information
- Full name: Ngô Xuân Sơn
- Date of birth: 17 January 1997 (age 29)
- Place of birth: Cửa Lò, Nghệ An, Vietnam
- Height: 1.77 m (5 ft 10 in)
- Position: Goalkeeper

Team information
- Current team: Thai Nguyen

Youth career
- 2009–2015: Viettel

Senior career*
Years	Team	Apps	(Gls)
2016–2026	Viettel	29	(0)
2026–	Thai Nguyen	1	(0)

International career^{‡}
2017–2018	Vietnam U21	2	(0)
- * Club domestic league appearances and goals as of 8 November 2026 ‡ National team caps and goals as of 13 December 2017

Ngô Xuân Sơn (born 17 January 1997) is a Vietnamese footballer who plays as a goalkeeper for V.League 2 club Thai Nguyen.

== Honours ==
=== Club ===
Viettel F.C

- V.League 2

(silver) Runners-up : 2016

=== International ===
Vietnam U21

- International U-21 Thanh Niên Newspaper Cup

(silver) Runners-up : : 2017
