= Thai Nguyen FC =

Vietnamese football club

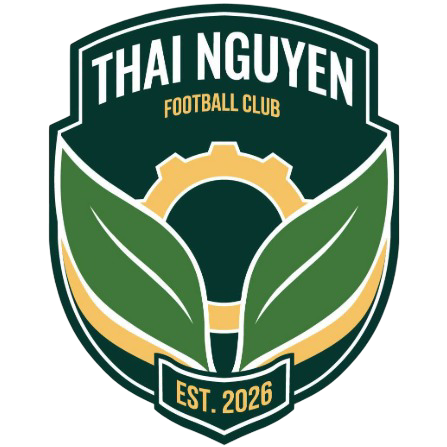
- Full name: Thai Nguyen Football Club (Câu lạc bộ bóng đá Thái Nguyên)
- Founded: 30 July 2026; 3 months ago
- Ground: Thái Nguyên Stadium
- Capacity: 22,000
- Chairman: Vũ Phi Hổ
- Manager: Phạm Minh Đức
- League: V.League 2
- 2026: Vietnamese Second Division, 1st of 7 (Group A, promoted)
Home colours	Away colours	Third colours

Thai Nguyen Football Club (Vietnamese: Câu lạc bộ bóng đá Thái Nguyên) is a Vietnamese football club based in Thái Nguyên. The club is playing its home matches at the 22,000-capacity Thái Nguyên Stadium. The club competes in the V.League 2, after taking over Hà Nội B's spot following their promotion from 2025 Vietnamese Second Division.

== History ==
In 2022, Hà Nội B, the reserves team of V.League 1 side Hà Nội, entered the 2022 Third Division. The team took five seasons before promoting to the V.League 2 from the 2026–27 season as play-off winners in the 2026 Second Division.

On 30 July 2026, the People's Committee of Thái Nguyên province approved the proposal to establish the Thái Nguyên Football Club. As the result, Hà Nội B successfully transferred their V.League 2 participation slot to the newly established Thái Nguyên team. This is the first ever professional men's football team from Thái Nguyên province.

== Kits ==
Home 2026–27	Away 2026–27	Third 2026–27	Fourth 2026–27	Fifth 2026–27

== Coaching staff ==
Position	Name
Head coach	(Vietnam) Phạm Minh Đức
Assistant coach	Lương Trung Tuấn; Trần Doãn Dũng; Trần Duy Quang
Goalkeeper coach	Trần Quốc Trung

== Current squad ==
As of 7 September 2026

Note: Flags indicate national team as defined under FIFA eligibility rules; some limited exceptions apply. Players may hold more than one non-FIFA nationality.

No.	Pos.	Nation	Player
5	DF	VIE	Nguyễn Xuân Kiên (on loan from Hà Nội)
6	FW	VIE	Phạm Anh Tuấn
7	MF	VIE	Đoàn Phú Quý
8	MF	VIE	Bùi Tuấn Anh (on loan from Hà Nội)
9	DF	VIE	Nguyễn Sỹ Đức (on loan from Hà Nội)
10	MF	VIE	Nguyễn Trung Thành
11	MF	VIE	Nguyễn Văn Trạng
12	DF	VIE	Lê Trí Phong
15	DF	VIE	Cao Trần Hoàng Hùng
16	MF	VIE	Đinh Tuấn Tài
17	FW	VIE	Nguyễn Đình Thịnh
18	MF	VIE	Nguyễn Anh Tú
19	FW	VIE	Nguyễn Thiên Phú (on loan from Hà Nội)
20	MF	VIE	Dương Văn Hào
21	DF	VIE	Vi Văn Dũng (on loan from Hà Nội)

No.	Pos.	Nation	Player
22	FW	VIE	Nguyễn Văn Tám
24	GK	VIE	Phan Đình Vũ Hải
25	GK	VIE	Khúc Quang Hiếu
26	DF	VIE	Lê Văn Đại
27	FW	VIE	Nguyễn Hà Anh Tuấn (on loan from Hà Nội)
28	DF	VIE	Nguyễn Cảnh Tài
29	DF	VIE	Đỗ Minh Quân
30	MF	VIE	Đỗ Thành Đạt
39	MF	UGA	Geoffrey Kizito
68	DF	VIE	Chử Ngọc Diệp (on loan from Hà Nội)
69	MF	VIE	Nguyễn Xuân Toàn
74	MF	VIE	Dương Đình Nguyên
88	FW	USA	Victor Mansaray
97	GK	VIE	Ngô Xuân Sơn
98	MF	VIE	Nguyễn Tiến Đạt

== See also ==
- Thái Nguyên T&T, women's football team from Thái Nguyên
