= 2025 Four-Team Football Tournament - Thái Nguyên =

Giải bóng đá Tứ hùng – Thái Nguyên 2025 (in Vietnamese)

Tournament details
- Host country: Vietnam
- City: Thái Nguyên
- Dates: 21–27 December
- Teams: 4 (from 1 association)
- Venue: 1 (in 1 host city)

Final positions
- Champions: Hoang Anh Gia Lai (1st title)
- Runners-up: PVF-CAND
- Third place: Hanoi FC
- Fourth place: Thể Công-Viettel

Tournament statistics
- Matches played: 6
- Goals scored: 17 (2.83 per match)
- Top scorer: (Brazil) Gabriel Conceição (2 goals)

The 2025 Four-Team Football Tournament - Thái Nguyên (Vietnamese: Giải bóng đá Tứ hùng – Thái Nguyên 2025 or Cúp Tứ Hùng – Thái Nguyên 2025) was the friendly tournament of the Four-Hero Football Tournament, a friendly tournament organised by Department of Culture, Sports and Tourism of Thái Nguyên with Vietnam Football Federation (VFF).

At the same time, the tournament also celebrated the opening ceremony of the new Thái Nguyên Stadium.

== Format ==
The four invited V.League 1 teams (Hanoi FC, Hoang Anh Gia Lai, PVF-CAND and Thể Công-Viettel) each played three matches, never facing the same opposition more than once. Teams were awarded three points for a win, one for a draw and zero for a loss. Following the conclusion of the tournament, the club with the most points was named the winner of the Four-Team Football Tournament. If multiple teams were tied on points, their position in the table was determined based on superior goal difference, then number of goals scored, and then results of head-to-head matches.

== Venues ==
Thái Nguyên	Location of the host cities of the 2025 Four-Hero Football Tournament - Thái Nguyên.
Thái Nguyên Stadium	Location of the host cities of the 2025 Four-Hero Football Tournament - Thái Nguyên.
Capacity: 22,000	Location of the host cities of the 2025 Four-Hero Football Tournament - Thái Nguyên.

== Standings ==
Pos	Team	Pld	W	D	L	GF	GA	GD	Pts	Final result
1	Hoang Anh Gia Lai	3	1	1	1	5	3	+2	4	Champions
2	PVF-CAND	3	1	1	1	3	3	0	4	Runner-up
3	Hanoi FC	3	1	1	1	5	7	−2	4	Third place
4	Thể Công-Viettel	3	0	3	0	4	4	0	3	Fourth place

Source: VOV
Rules for classification: 1) Points; 2) Goal difference; 3) Goals scored; 4) Head-to-head result; 5) Head-to-head record; 6) Fair play ranking; 7) Disciplinary points.

== Results ==
All times are local, ICT (UTC+7)

=== Matchday 1 ===
21 December 2025
15:00

Hanoi FC	1–4	Hoang Anh Gia Lai
Nguyễn Anh Tú 61'	Report	Nguyễn Duy Tâm 14'; Nguyễn Xuân Kiên 27' (o.g.); Gabriel 60' (pen.); Khevin 87'

Thái Nguyên Stadium, Thái Nguyên
Referee: Nguyễn Mạnh Hải
21 December 2025
19:30

PVF-CAND	1–1	Thể Công-Viettel
Samson 51'	Report	Bùi Văn Đức 82'

Thái Nguyên Stadium, Thái Nguyên
Referee: Nguyễn Viết Duẩn

=== Matchday 2 ===
24 December 2025
15:30

Hoang Anh Gia Lai	1–1	Thể Công-Viettel
Gabriel 87' (pen.)	Report	Trần Danh Trung 27'

Thái Nguyên Stadium, Thái Nguyên
Referee: Trần Ngọc Ánh
24 December 2025
18:30

PVF-CAND	1–2	Hanoi FC
Nguyễn Bảo Long 39'	Report	Đỗ Hùng Dũng 68'; Nguyễn Văn Tùng 72' (pen.)

Thái Nguyên Stadium, Thái Nguyên
Referee: Lê Thanh Tùng

=== Matchday 3 ===
27 December 2025
15:00

Hoang Anh Gia Lai	0–1	PVF-CAND
	Report	Amarildo 25'

Thái Nguyên Stadium, Thái Nguyên
Referee: Nguyễn Viết Duẩn
27 December 2025
18:00

The Cong-Viettel	2–2	Hanoi FC
Nguyễn Hoàng Khanh 36'; Nguyễn Hữu Thắng 75'	Report	Nguyễn Hà Anh Tuấn 65'; Nguyễn Văn Tùng 82'

Thái Nguyên Stadium, Thái Nguyên
Referee: Nguyễn Mạnh Hải

== Statistics ==
=== Goalscorers ===
There were 17 goals scored in 6 matches, for an average of 2.83 goals per match.

2 goals

- (Brazil) Gabriel Conceição

1 goal

- (Vietnam) Nguyễn Anh Tú
- (Vietnam) Nguyễn Duy Tâm
- (Brazil) Khevin Fraga
- (Nigeria) Samson Olaleye
- (Vietnam) Bùi Văn Đức
- (Vietnam) Trần Danh Trung
- (Vietnam) Nguyễn Bảo Long
- (Vietnam) Đỗ Hùng Dũng
- (Vietnam) Nguyễn Văn Tùng
- (Brazil) Amarildo Aparecido
- (Vietnam) Nguyễn Hoàng Khanh
- (Vietnam) Nguyễn Hữu Thắng
- (Vietnam) Nguyễn Hà Anh Tuấn
- (Vietnam) Nguyễn Văn Tùng

1 own goal

- (Vietnam) Nguyễn Xuân Kiên (against Hanoi FC)
