= Nguyễn Mạnh Hưng =

Vietnamese footballer

Personal information
- Full name: Nguyễn Mạnh Hưng
- Date of birth: 8 August 2005 (age 21)
- Place of birth: Thanh Hà, Hải Dương, Vietnam
- Height: 1.77 m (5 ft 10 in)
- Position: Center back

Team information
- Current team: Hưng Yên (on loan from Thể Công-Viettel)
- Number: 4

Youth career
- –2023: Viettel

Senior career*
| Years | Team | Apps | (Gls) |
| 2023– | Thể Công-Viettel | 2 | (0) |
| 2023–2024 | → Trường Tươi Bình Phước (loan) | 10 | (0) |
| 2025–2026 | → Hồng Lĩnh Hà Tĩnh (loan) | 8 | (0) |
| 2026– | → Hưng Yên (loan) | 4 | (0) |

International career^{‡}
| 2021–2022 | Vietnam U16 | 2 | (0) |
| 2023–2025 | Vietnam U20 | 3 | (0) |
| 2023– | Vietnam U23 | 9 | (0) |
Medal record
Men's football
Representing Vietnam
AFF U-23 Championship
| Winner | Thailand 2023 |
- * Club domestic league appearances and goals as of 24 October 2026 ‡ National team caps and goals as of 17 April 2024

Nguyễn Mạnh Hưng (born 8 August 2005) is a Vietnamese professional footballer who plays as a center back for V.League 2 team Hưng Yên, on loan from Thể Công-Viettel.

== Club career ==
Born in Hải Dương, Mạnh Hưng trained in the Viettel youth academy.

In August 2023, Mạnh Hưng joined V.League 2 side Trường Tươi Bình Phước on a loan deal. On 31 October 2023, he made his professional debut, starting in his team's 2–2 draw against SHB Đà Nẵng.

In August 2025, Mạnh Hưng was loaned to V.League 1 side Hồng Lĩnh Hà Tĩnh.

In August 2026, Mạnh Hưng moved to V.League 2 club Hưng Yên on another loan deal.

== International career ==
In March 2022, Mạnh Hưng was named in the Vietnam under-17's 19-player squad for a training camp in Germany. After the training camp ended, he was one of the two players selected by the staff of Eintracht Frankfurt to stay and train with the team for one more week.

In 2023, Mạnh Hưng participated at the 2023 AFC U-20 Asian Cup with the Vietnam under-20s, starting all three group matches. Later that year, he was included in the Vietnam U23s' 23-men squad for the 2023 AFF U-23 Championship as Vietnam were later crowned as champions.

== Honours ==
Vietnam U23

- AFF U-23 Championship: 2023
- Gia Lai U-23 VTV Cup: 2026
