= Truong Quoc Minh =

Danish footballer

Personal information
- Full name: Trương Minh Quốc
- Date of birth: 7 November 2000 (age 26)
- Place of birth: Aarhus, Denmark
- Height: 1.75 m (5 ft 9 in)
- Positions: Full back; midfielder

Team information
- Current team: Khatoco Khánh Hòa
- Number: 7

Youth career
- –2017: Aarhus GF

Senior career*
Years	Team	Apps	(Gls)
2018–2020	Aarhus Fremad	27	(1)
2020–2021	Viby IF		
2021	Aarhus Fremad	14	(0)
2021	VSK Aarhus	6	(0)
2021–2022	Brabrand IF	40	(0)
2023	Viby IF		
2023–2024	Khánh Hòa	7	(0)
2024	Quảng Nam	4	(0)
2024–2026	Skive IK	14	(0)
2026–	Khatoco Khánh Hòa	1	(1)

International career^{‡}
2019–2021	Denmark Futsal	11	(0)
- * Club domestic league appearances and goals as of 11 October 2026 ‡ National team caps and goals as of 22 October 2023

Truong Quoc Minh (Vietnamese: Trương Minh Quốc; born 7 November 2000) is a Danish professional footballer who plays as a right back or winger for V.League 2 club Khatoco Khánh Hòa.

== Early career ==
Truong was born in Denmark to Vietnamese parents. He played for the youth team of Danish Superliga side Aarhus GF.

== Club career ==
After he got released by Aarhus GF in 2017, Truong spent several years playing in Danish lower division teams including Aarhus Fremad, VSK Aarhus, Brabrand IF and Viby IF.

=== Khanh Hoa ===
On 7 October 2023, Truong joined V.League 1 club Khanh Hoa FC, signing a one-year contract. He made his debut for the club on 22 October 2023 against Ho Chi Minh City in a 2–0 away defeat.

== International career ==
Truong was a member of the Denmark national futsal team. He made two appearances during the UEFA Futsal Euro 2022 qualifying against Croatia and Ukraine.

== Career statistics ==
As of match played 14 June 2025

Appearances and goals by club, season and competition
Club	Season	League			National cup (Note: Includes Vietnamese Cup, Danish Cup)		Other		Total	
Club	Season	Division	Apps	Goals	Apps	Goals	Apps	Goals	Apps	Goals
Khanh Hoa	2023–24	V.League 1	7	0	1	0	—		8	0
Quang Nam	2023–24	V.League 1	4	0	0	0	—		4	0
Skive IK	2024–25	2nd Division	14	0	3	0	—		17	0
Khatoco Khánh Hòa	2026–27	V.League 2	0	0	0	0	—		0	0
Total			25	0	4	0	0	0	29	0
