= Hung Yen FC =

Vietnamese football club

- Full name: Hung Yen Football Club (Câu lạc bộ bóng đá Hưng Yên)
- Founded: 22 July 2026; 2 months ago
- Ground: PVF Stadium
- Capacity: 4,500
- Owner: KBC Hung Yen J.S.C.
- Chairman: Đặng Thành Tâm
- Manager: Nguyễn Duy Đông
- League: V.League 2
- 2025–26: V.League 2, 6th of 12
- Website: Website

Hung Yen Football Club (Vietnamese: Câu lạc bộ bóng đá Hưng Yên) is a Vietnamese football club based in Hưng Yên. The club is playing its home matches at the 4,500-capacity PVF Stadium. The club competes in the V.League 2 after taking over PVF-CAND B's spot in the league.

== History ==
In 2024, PVF-CAND established their reserves team and entered the 2024 Third Division. The team promoted to the 2025 Second Division, before gaining a spot at the 2025–26 V.League 2 after several teams withdrew from the league. The team finished sixth in their first season at professional level. However, following the relegation of their parent club, PVF-CAND, to V.League 2, the two teams could not compete in the same division as both share the same legal entity.

In July 2026, the club's ownership was transferred to KBC Vietnam Technology Joint Stock Company. On 22 July 2026, the People's Committee of Hưng Yên province authorized the team to adopt the name Hung Yen Football Club.

== Coaching staff ==
Position	Name
Head coach	(Vietnam) Nguyễn Duy Đông
Assistant coach	(Vietnam) Nguyễn Anh Tuấn (Vietnam) Nguyễn Quốc Trung
Goalkeeper coach	(Vietnam) Lê Văn Việt
Fitness coach	(Vietnam) Nguyễn Quang Tú
Video analyst	(Vietnam) Ngô Mạnh Dương
Physiotherapist	(Vietnam) Nguyễn Huy Hoàng (Vietnam) Nguyễn Trọng Hương
Logistics	(Vietnam) Đặng Xuân Trường

== Current squad ==
As of 4 September 2026

Note: Flags indicate national team as defined under FIFA eligibility rules; some limited exceptions apply. Players may hold more than one non-FIFA nationality.

No.	Pos.	Nation	Player
3	DF	VIE	Trần Hải Anh
4	DF	VIE	Nguyễn Mạnh Hưng (on loan from Thể Công–Viettel)
5	FW	VIE	Trần Đức Nam
7	DF	VIE	Huỳnh Thế Hiếu
8	MF	VIE	Mạc Hồng Quân
9	FW	VIE	Vũ Minh Hiếu
10	FW	VIE	Nguyễn Trọng Đức Vũ (on loan from PVF)
11	FW	TTO	Shaqkeem Joseph
13	MF	VIE	Nguyễn Gia Bảo (on loan from PVF)
15	DF	VIE	Lê Tấn Dũng (on loan from Sông Lam Nghệ An)
16	MF	VIE	Nguyễn Như Tuấn
17	DF	VIE	Nguyễn Trọng Hiếu
18	MF	VIE	Nguyễn Trọng Tuấn (on loan from Sông Lam Nghệ An)
19	MF	VIE	Tạ Xuân Trường

No.	Pos.	Nation	Player
20	FW	VIE	Nguyễn Đăng Dương (on loan from Thể Công–Viettel)
21	DF	VIE	Vũ Văn Quyết
22	DF	VIE	Nguyễn Ngọc Toàn
23	DF	VIE	Hoàng Trung Anh (on loan from Công An Hà Nội)
25	GK	VIE	Đặng Tuấn Hưng
26	GK	VIE	Huỳnh Tuấn Linh
29	DF	VIE	Tiêu Trung Hiếu (on loan from Thể Công–Viettel)
31	DF	VIE	Trịnh Đức Lợi
33	GK	VIE	Dương Tùng Lâm
43	DF	VIE	Lê Văn Hưng
68	FW	VIE	Lê Minh Bình
77	MF	CZE	Duong Thanh Tung
88	MF	VIE	Bùi Long Nhật
97	DF	VIE	Mạc Đức Việt Anh
