= Duong Thanh Tung =

Czech footballer

Personal information
- Full name: Tomáš Duong Thanh Tung
- Date of birth: 5 March 1999 (age 27)
- Place of birth: Czech Republic
- Height: 1.86 m (6 ft 1 in)
- Position: Winger

Team information
- Current team: Hung Yen
- Number: 77

Youth career
- 2007–2010: Litvínov
- 2010–2016: Baník Most
- 2013: → Josefa Masopusta (loan)
- 2016–2018: Bohemians 1905

Senior career*
Years	Team	Apps	(Gls)
2018–2019	Mostecký FK	2	(0)
2018–2019	→ Viktoria Žižkov B (loan)	0	(0)
2019–2020	Meteor Prague		
2020–2023	Slovan Velvary	54	(0)
2022	→ Loko Vltavín (loan)	10	(0)
2024–2025	Quy Nhon Binh Dinh	10	(0)
2025–2026	The Cong-Viettel	2	(0)
2026–	Hung Yen	0	(0)
- * Club domestic league appearances and goals as of 7 June 2026

Tomáš Duong Thanh Tung (Vietnamese: Dương Thanh Tùng, born 5 March 1999) is a Czech professional footballer who plays as a winger for V.League 2 club Hung Yen.

== Career ==
Thanh Tung was born in the Czech Republic to Vietnamese parents. He started his career with Mostecký FK in the Czech Fourth Division. Before the second half of 2018–19 season, he was sent on loan to the reserves side of Viktoria Žižkov. At the beginning of the 2019–20 season, he joined Czech Fourth Division fellow Meteor Prague. He left the team after one season, signing for Slovan Velvary in the Czech Third Division, but was sent on loan to Loko Vltavín shortly after.

In August 2024, at the invitation of fellow Czech-Vietnamese footballer Mạc Hồng Quân, Thanh Tung went for a trial at V.League 1 club Quy Nhon Binh Dinh. The club announced the signature of Thanh Tung on 6 August. He made his professional debut on 14 September in the first matchday of the 2024–25 V.League 1, coming in as a substitute in the 88th minute in his club's 0–1 defeat against Hanoi FC. On 20 October 2024, he scored his first goal for Quy Nhon Binh Dinh in the 2024–25 Vietnamese Cup game against Becamex Binh Duong.

On 7 August 2025, The Cong-Viettel announced the signature of Thanh Tung to the team.

In August 2026, Thanh Tung moved to V.League 2 club Hưng Yên.
