= Nguyễn Đăng Dương =

Vietnamese footballer (born 2005)

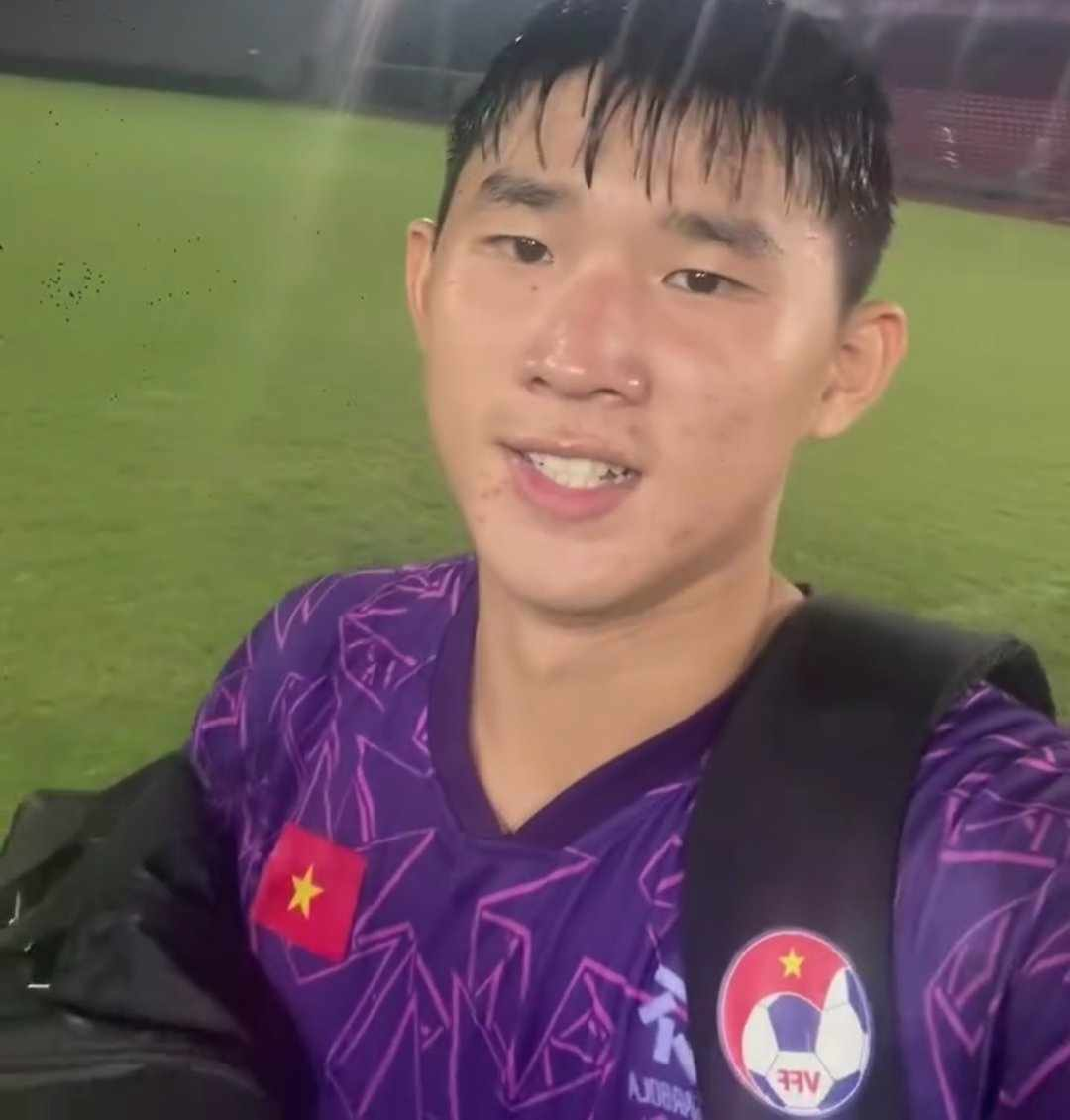
- Đăng Dương in 2024

Personal information
- Full name: Nguyễn Đăng Dương
- Date of birth: 7 September 2005 (age 21)
- Place of birth: Bắc Ninh, Vietnam
- Height: 1.84 m (6 ft 0 in)
- Position: Striker

Team information
- Current team: Hưng Yên (on loan from Thể Công-Viettel)
- Number: 79

Youth career
- –2024: Viettel

Senior career*
Years	Team	Apps	(Gls)
2023–	Thể Công-Viettel	3	(0)
2023	→ SHB Đà Nẵng (loan)	0	(0)
2026–	→ Hưng Yên (loan)	6	(2)

International career^{‡}
2022–2024	Vietnam U20	9	(1)
2023–	Vietnam U23	5	(0)
2026–	Vietnam	1	(0)
Medal record
Men's football
Representing Vietnam
AFF U-23 Championship
Winner	Thailand 2023
- * Club domestic league appearances and goals as of 31 October 2025 ‡ National team caps and goals as of 17 November 2026

Nguyễn Đăng Dương (born 7 September 2005) is a Vietnamese professional footballer who plays as a striker for V.League 2 club Hưng Yên, on loan from Thể Công-Viettel, and the Vietnam national team.

== Club career ==
Đăng Dương was a youth product of Viettel. With Viettel youth categories, he regularly featured in the top scoring list in Vietnamese youth tournaments with his good shooting ability and intelligent positioning.

In October 2023, Đăng Dương joined V.League 2 side SHB Đà Nẵng on a loan deal until the end of the season. However, when he was yet to make his debut for the team, his loan spell was terminated after the first half of the 2023–24 season.

On 23 February 2025, Đăng Dương made his professional debut with Thể Công-Viettel in the club's 1–2 defeat against Công An Hà Nội in the V.League 1.

In August 2026, Đăng Dương moved to V.League 2 club Hưng Yên on loan.

== International career ==
In August 2023, Đăng Dương was selected among Vietnam U23's 23-men squad for the 2023 AFF U-23 Championship. He made two appearances during the tournament, in the group stage game against Philippines where he assisted the only goal of the match, and then in the final against Indonesia as Vietnam won the title.

In November 2026, Đăng Dương received his first call-up to the Vietnam national team, being named in the squad for the friendly tournament Casper Cup.

== Honours ==
Vietnam U19

- International Thanh Niên Newspaper Cup: 2022

Vietnam U23

- AFF U-23 Championship: 2023
