= Thái Nguyên Stadium =

Stadium in Thái Nguyên, Vietnam

Coordinates: 21°33′20″N 105°46′43″E

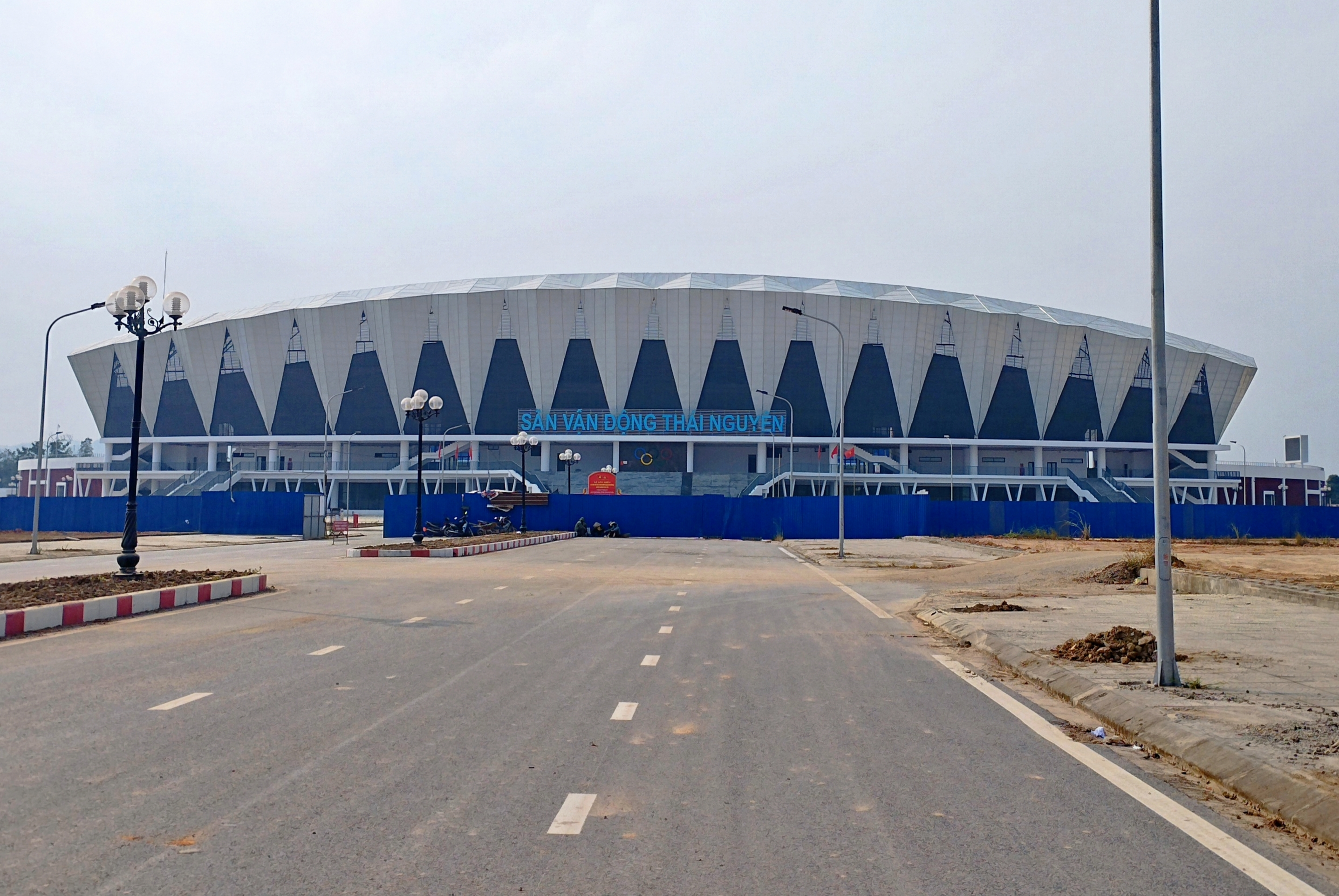
- Facade of the stadium shortly before its inauguration
- Interactive map of Thái Nguyên Stadium
- Location: Đại Phúc, Thái Nguyên, Vietnam
- Owner: Thái Nguyên Government
- Capacity: 22,000
- Surface: Zeon Zoysia grass
- Acreage: 15.47 ha (38.2 acres)

Construction
- Groundbreaking: 1 October 2022
- Opened: 19 December 2025
- Cost: 535 billion VND (US$ 20 million)

Tenants
- Thái Nguyên T&T; Thái Nguyên FC; Vietnam national football team (selected match)

Thái Nguyên Stadium (Vietnamese: Sân vận động Thái Nguyên) is a multi-purpose stadium in Thái Nguyên, Vietnam. It is currently used mostly for football matches. The stadium holds 22,000 spectators.

The stadium replaces the old Thái Nguyên Stadium, which was located in Trưng Vương, Thái Nguyên.

== History ==
In 2016, the People's Committee of Thai Nguyen province approved the detailed plan for the Thai Nguyen Provincial Sports Complex, which included the construction of a new provincial-level stadium. According to the plan, the new provincial stadium will be built on an area of 15.47 hectares (38.23 acres) in Phúc Trìu commune, west of Thái Nguyên.

This new stadium has a capacity of 22,000 seats, a roof, a surrounding pitch, and modern equipment ensuring international standards, with an initial total investment of over 309 billion VND. The stadium was expected to start construction in the second quarter of 2022. and completed in 2025.

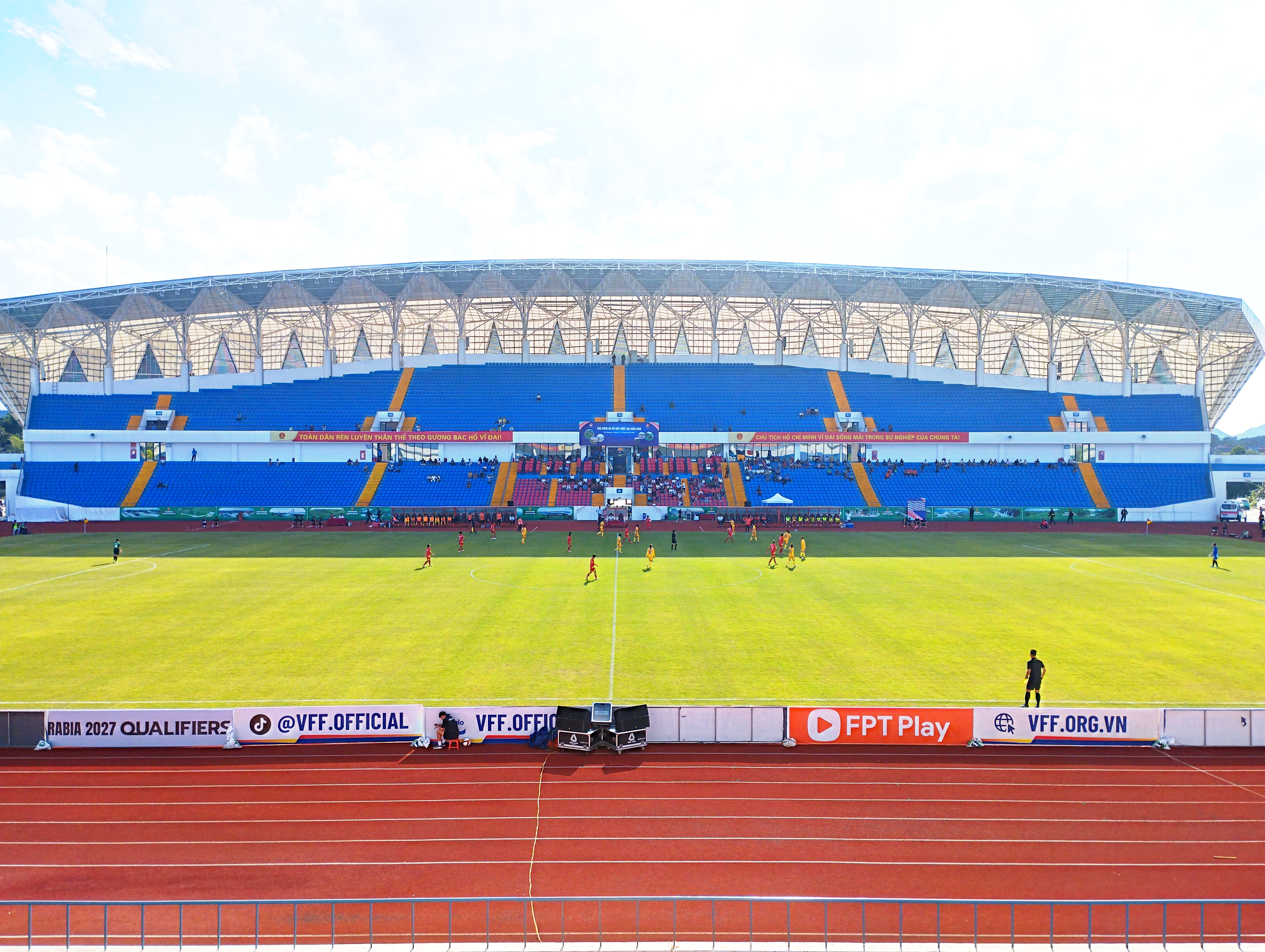
The A stands

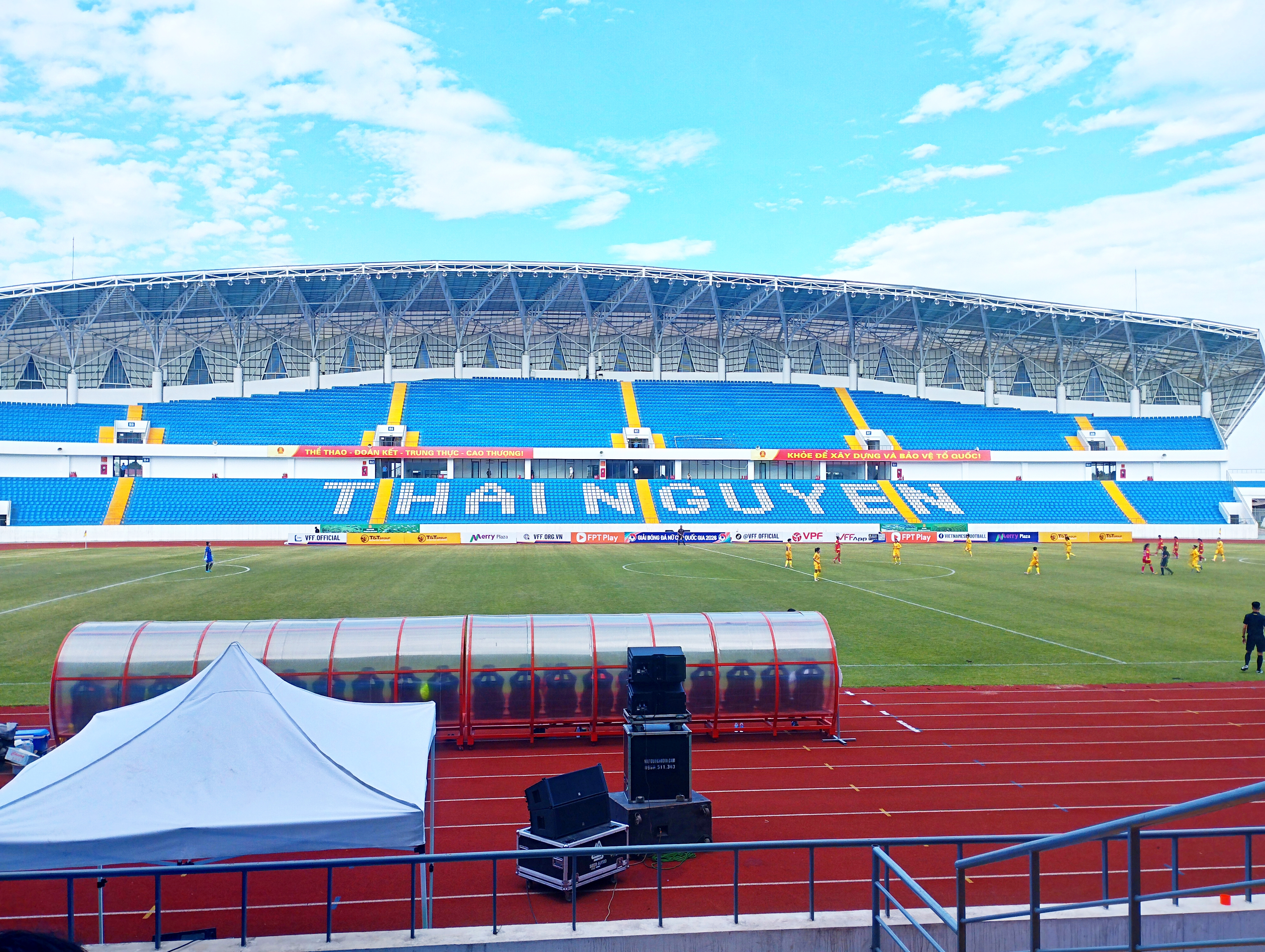
The B stands

The stadium was first used in the 2025 Four-Club Football Tournament - Thái Nguyên.

== Interior ==
Thái Nguyên Stadium has 4 stands. The A and B stands are covered each by an arched roof with full seats. The C and D stands no seats installed.

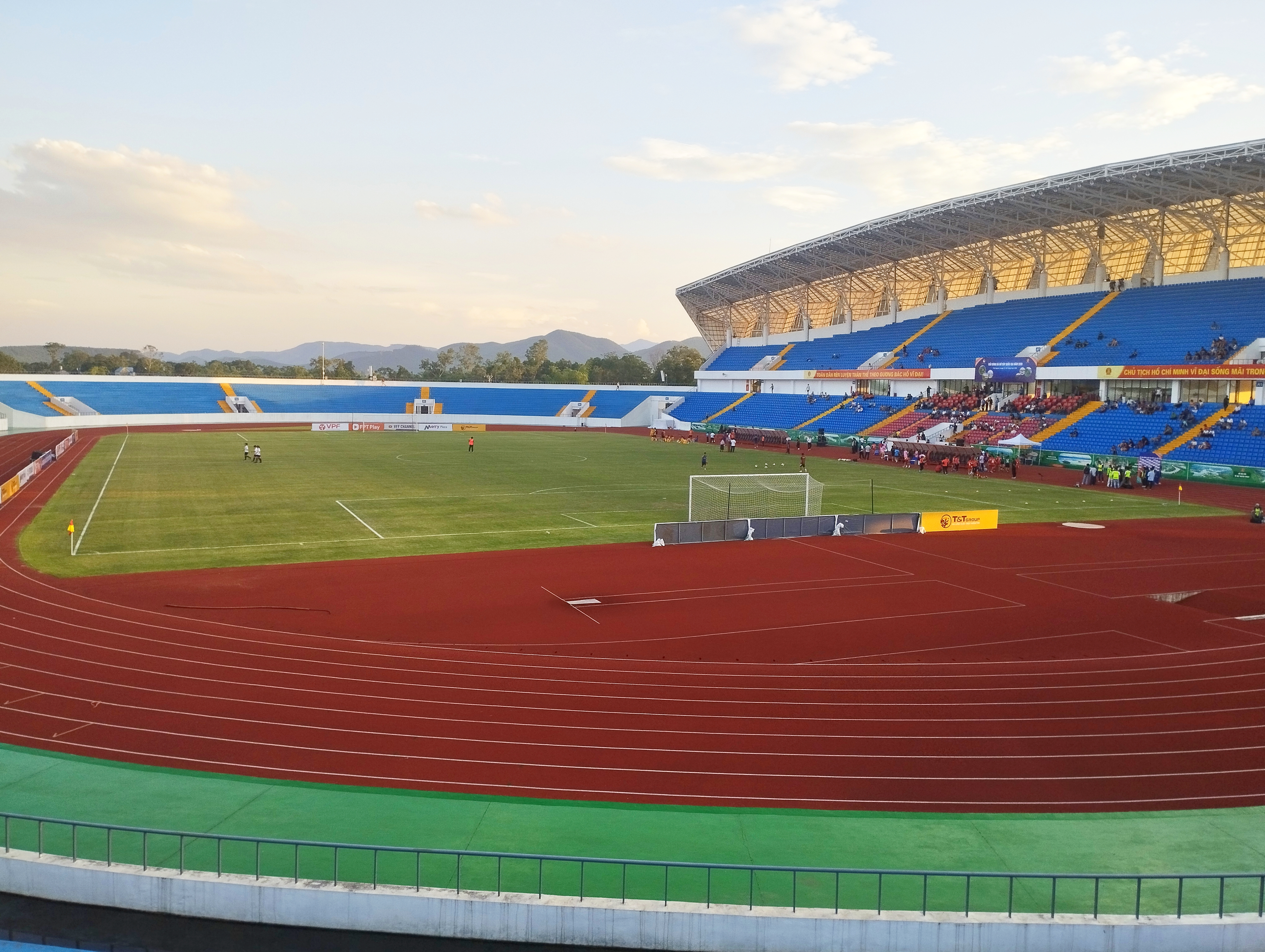
A part of A stands

The B stands in evening

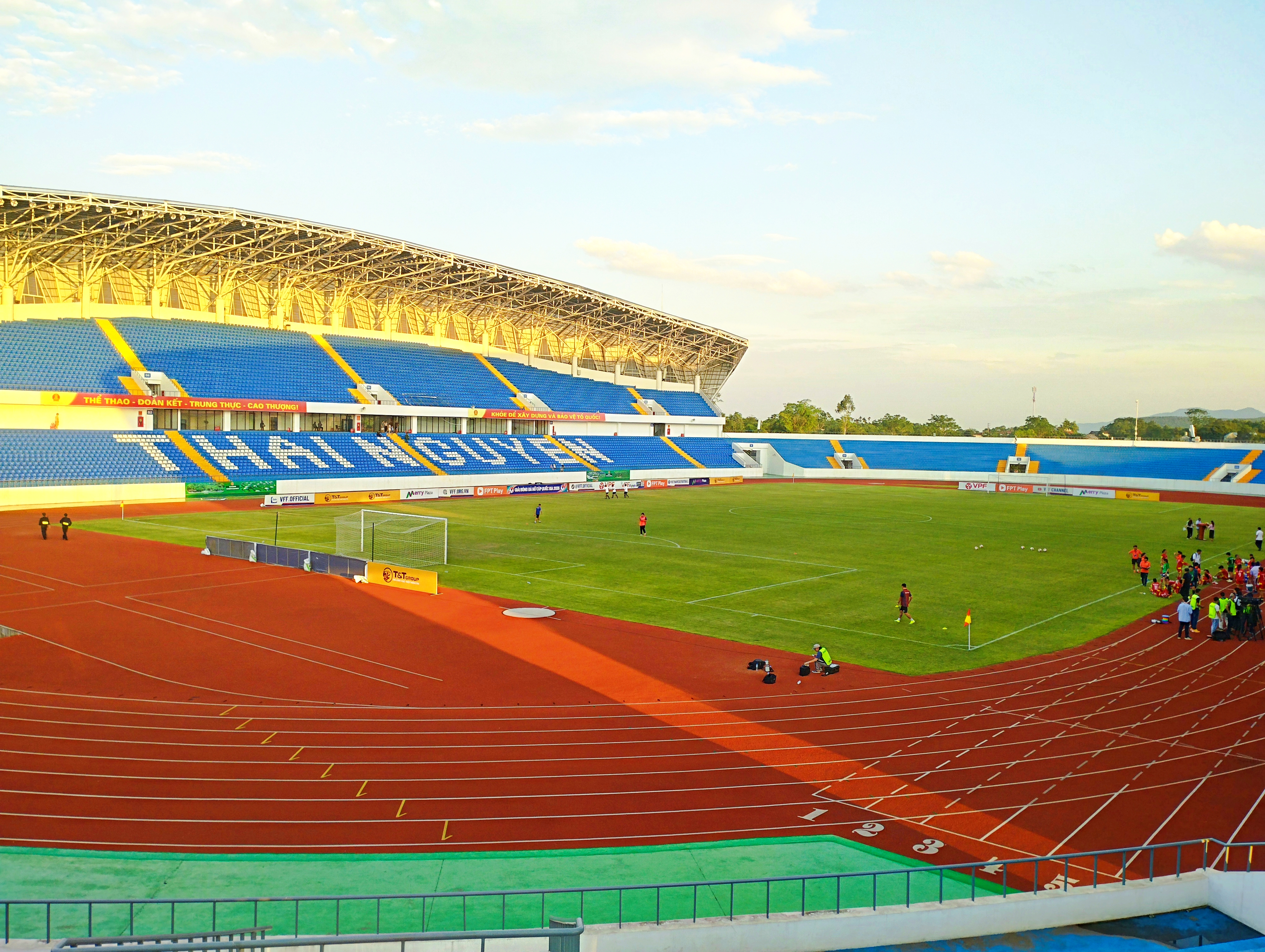
A part of B stands

== International football matches ==
Date	Competition	Team 1	Res.	Team 2
18 July 2026	Friendly	Vietnam	4–0	Myanmar
