= Brandon Ly =

Irish footballer (born 2005)

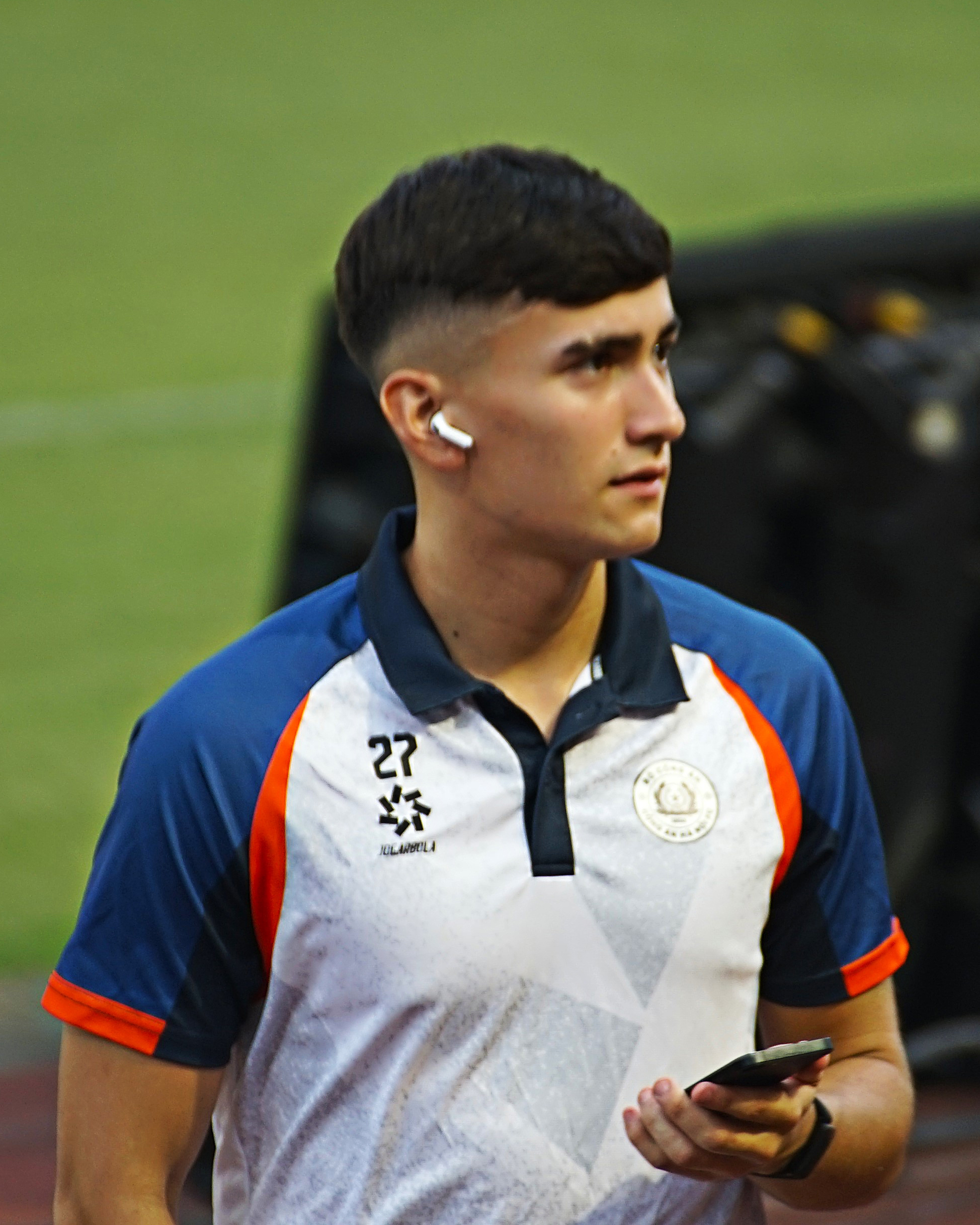
- Ly in 2026

Personal information
- Full name: Brandon Michael Ly
- Date of birth: 7 December 2005 (age 20)
- Place of birth: Longford, Ireland
- Height: 1.77 m (5 ft 10 in)
- Position: Midfielder

Team information
- Current team: Xuan Thien Phu Tho (on loan from Cong An Hanoi)
- Number: 10

Youth career
- –2023: Sheffield United
- 2023–2025: Burnley

Senior career*
Years	Team	Apps	(Gls)
2023	→ Hyde United (loan)	0	(0)
2025–	Cong An Hanoi	3	(0)
2026–	→ Xuan Thien Phu Tho (loan)	5	(2)
- * Club domestic league appearances and goals as of 21 November 2026

Brandon Michael Ly (born 7 December 2005) is an Irish professional footballer who plays as a midfielder for V.League 2 club Xuan Thien Phu Tho, on loan from Cong An Hanoi.

== Early life ==
Ly was born on 7 December 2005 in Longford, Ireland, to an Irish mother and a Hoa ethnic Vietnamese father.

== Career ==
As a youth player, Ly joined the youth academy of English side Sheffield United. During the summer of 2023, he was sent on loan to English 7th tier side Hyde United.

After leaving the Burnley youth academy, he moved to Vietnam, signing for V.League 1 side Cong An Hanoi ahead of the 2025–26 season.

In August 2026, Ly was loaned to V.League 2 club Xuan Thien Phu Tho.

== Style of play ==
Ly plays as a midfielder and is right-footed. Vietnamese newspaper People's Army Newspaper wrote in 2025 that "[his] position is defensive midfielder, where he shows his ability to win the ball back, control the tempo of the game and has outstanding physical strength. In addition, his versatility allows him to play well in the central midfield or right-back positions".

== Honours ==
Cong An Hanoi

- V.League 1: 2025–26
