= Victor Mansaray =

American soccer player (born 1997)

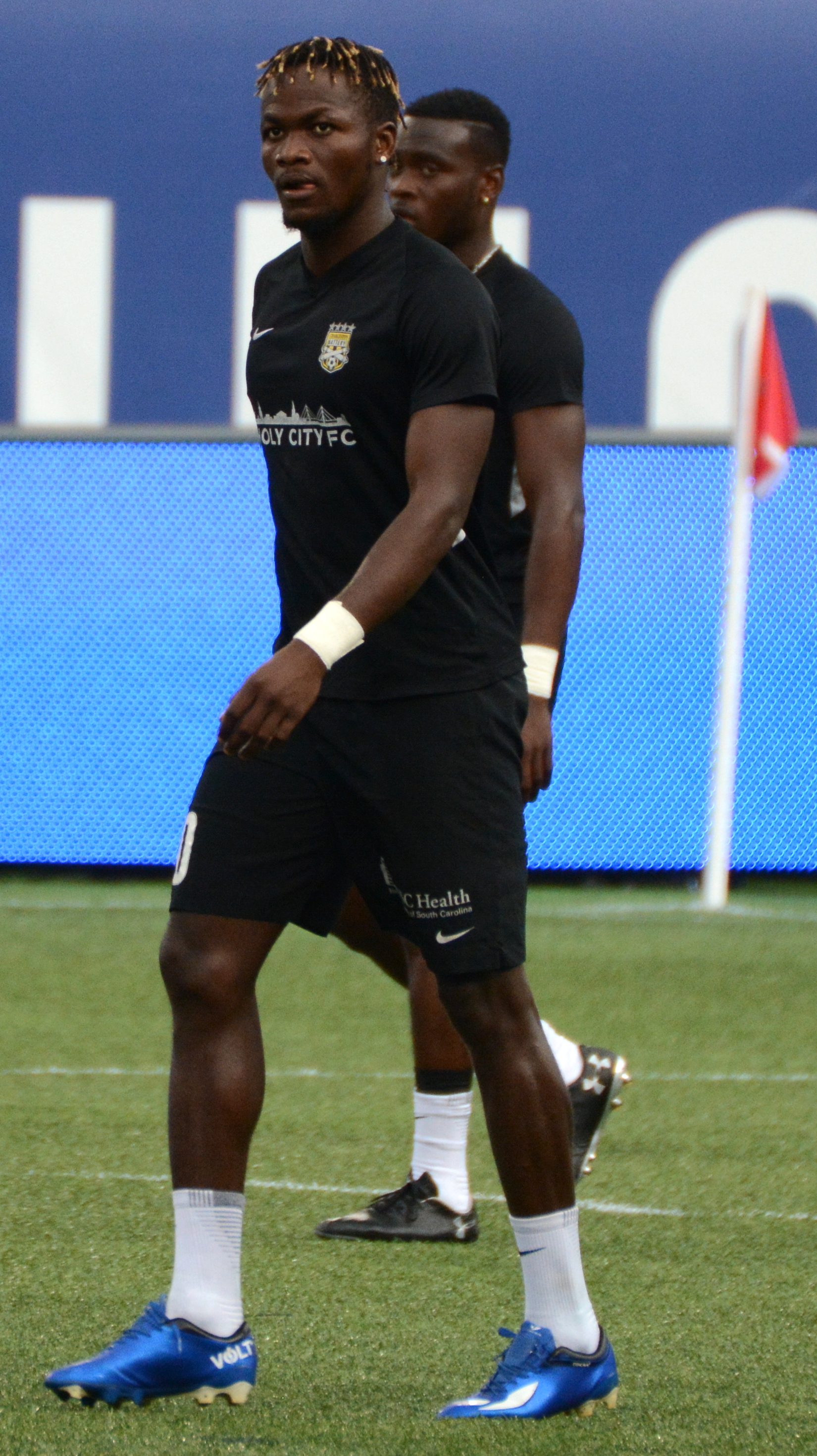
- Mansaray with Charleston Battery in 2018

Personal information
- Date of birth: February 22, 1997 (age 29)
- Place of birth: Freetown, Sierra Leone
- Height: 1.80 m (5 ft 11 in)
- Position: Forward

Team information
- Current team: Thái Nguyên
- Number: 88

Youth career
- 2012–2014: Seattle Sounders

Senior career*
Years	Team	Apps	(Gls)
2015–2017	Seattle Sounders	3	(0)
2015–2017	Seattle Sounders 2	37	(5)
2017	→ FC Cincinnati (loan)	8	(0)
2017	Umeå	7	(1)
2018	Charleston Battery	18	(2)
2019	Becamex Binh Duong	9	(2)
2019	Ho Chi Minh City	9	(5)
2020	Hong Linh Ha Tinh	16	(2)
2020–2021	Becamex Binh Duong	11	(2)
2022	Thep Xanh Nam Dinh	15	(2)
2023	Ho Chi Minh City	15	(9)
2023–2024	PSM Makassar	16	(4)
2024	Malut United	14	(1)
2025	Chitwan	6	(1)
2026	Persipura Jayapura	10	(4)
2026–	Thái Nguyên	8	(11)

International career
2014–2015	United States U18	2	(0)
2015–2017	United States U20	7	(0)
- * Club domestic league appearances and goals as of November 20, 2026

Victor Mansaray (born February 22, 1997) is a professional soccer player who plays as a forward for V.League 2 club Thái Nguyên. Born in Sierra Leone, he has represented the United States at youth level.

== Early life ==
Victor Mansaray was born in Freetown, Sierra Leone on February 2, 1997. During his youth, he spent time with his family in both Sierra Leone and Jamaica. He later moved to the Seattle area in Washington State. He first lived in the city of Puyallup before moving again to nearby Fife, where he attended Fife High School.

== Club career ==
=== Youth ===
Mansaray entered the Seattle Sounders Academy midway through the 2012–13 season and appeared in 20 games, scoring 11 goals. The following season, still with the U-16's, he scored a team-high 18 goals in 24 games.

=== Seattle Sounders ===
In November 2014, Mansaray signed with Seattle Sounders, making him the club's youngest ever signing at the age of 17, as well as their fourth Homegrown Player. He first appeared for Sounders during a pre-season match in the Desert Diamond Cup on February 21. He was substituted in at the 66th minute and scored a goal at the 74th, but the Sounders ultimately lost to Sporting Kansas City, 3–2. On March 21, 2015, he made his regular season professional debut with USL affiliate club Seattle Sounders 2 in a 4–2 victory over Sacramento Republic. He made his MLS debut a week later in a 0–0 draw away to FC Dallas.

==== FC Cincinnati (loan) ====
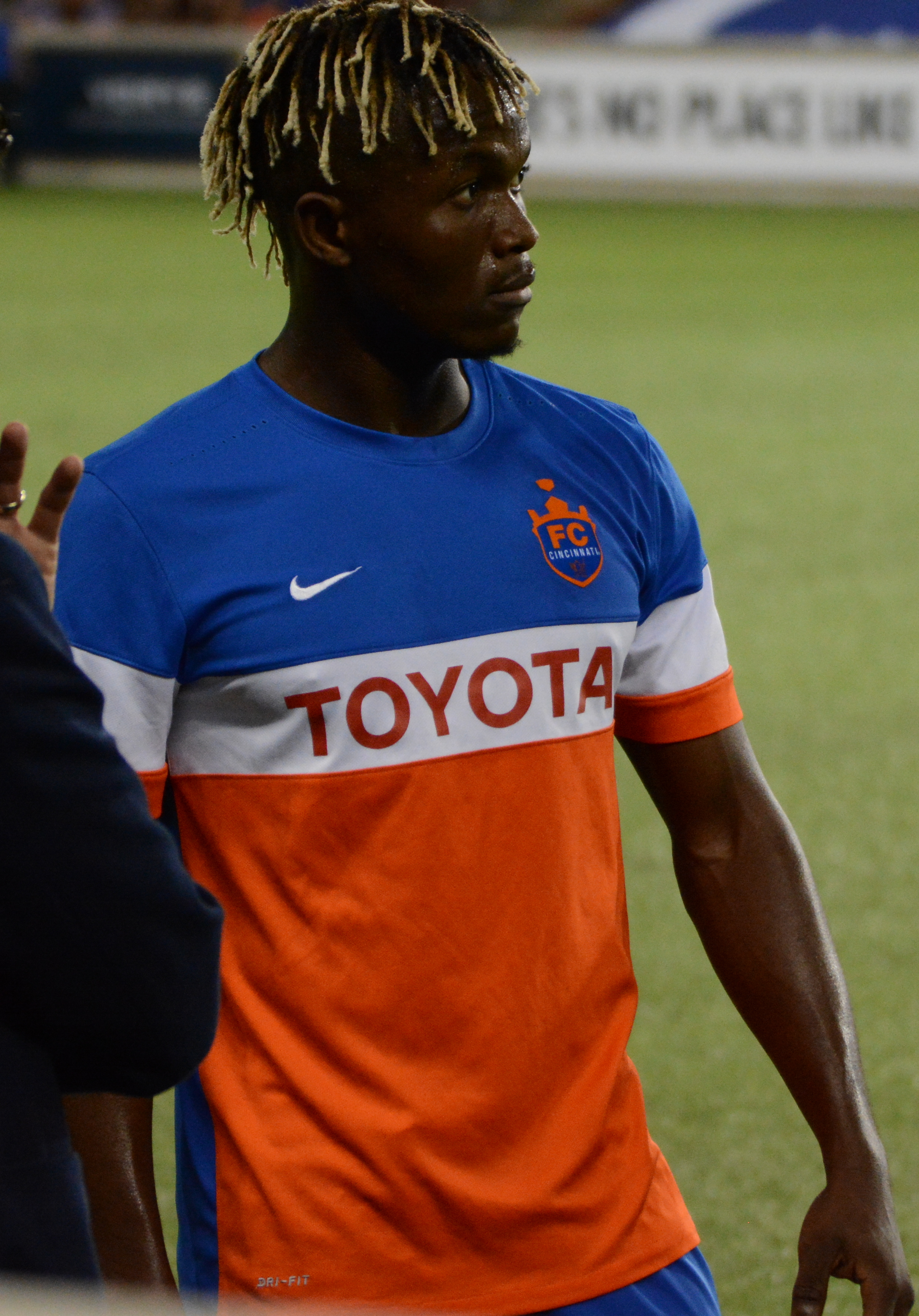
Mansaray playing for FC Cincinnati in 2017

On February 6, 2017, USL club FC Cincinnati announced that they had acquired Mansaray via a loan from Seattle Sounders. Cincinnati coach Alan Koch played Mansaray primarily as a substitute; Mansaray started for just three of his eight league appearances, and never played a full 90 minutes. On June 27, 2017, it was announced that Mansaray's loan had ended and he had returned to Seattle Sounders. He was waived by the club on August 10.

=== Umeå ===
He played for Umeå in the 2017 season.

=== Charleston Battery ===
After spending a season with Swedish side Umeå, Mansaray signed with USL side Charleston Battery for the 2018 season on February 14, 2018. Mansaray's option was declined by Charleston on November 30, 2018.

=== Becamex Binh Duong ===
On February 16, 2019, Mansaray joined V.League 1 side Becamex Binh Duong on a short-term contract.

=== Ho Chi Minh City ===
On July 2, 2019, he moved to another V.League 1 club Ho Chi Minh City with number 80 jersey.

=== Hong Linh Ha Tinh ===
In 2020, he joined Hong Linh Ha Tinh, also of V.League 1.

=== Becamex Binh Duong ===
In November 2020, Mansaray agreed a move to former club Becamex Binh Duong for the 2021 season.

=== PSM Makassar ===
On December 15, 2023, he decided to resign from Liga 1 club PSM Makassar after two months in the team. This was motivated by the team management's salary arrears. He said in his Instagram story that he felt lied to and betrayed by the management from PSM Makassar.

=== Malut United ===
On 29 July 2024, Mansaray becomes Malut United's last recruit ahead of 2024–25 Liga 1. Where the former PSM Makassar striker is the seventh foreign player recruited by Malut United this season. Mansaray was introduced by Malut United at the squad introduction and press conference in Jakarta.

=== Thai Nguyen FC ===
In August 2026, Mansaray moved to V.League 2 club Thai Nguyen.

== International career ==
=== United States U18 ===
Mansaray was selected to the United States under-18 national team in August 2014. He played two games in the friendly tournament hosted by the Czech Republic, against Hungary and Ukraine. Before choosing to play for the United States, Mansaray opted to forgo opportunities with Sierra Leone, as well as Jamaica. In December 2014, Mansaray received his third and fourth caps in two games against the Germany under-18 national team.

=== United States U20 ===
After turning 18 in February 2015, Mansaray moved up to the United States under-20 national team. He made one appearance for the United States U-20 team in 2015, followed by six appearances (with two goals scored) in 2016. In early 2017, Mansaray was called up for a United States U-20 training camp from January 31 to February 10. However, at the conclusion of the camp, Mansaray was not included on the team's 20-man roster for U-20 World Cup qualifying matches.

=== Sierra Leone ===
Shortly after being dropped from the U.S. team for the 2017 U20 World Cup, Mansaray told press he would be open to being called up by the Sierra Leone national team. On June 5, 2017, Mansaray announced via Instagram that he had been called up by Sierra Leone.
