= Hoa Binh FC =

Vietnamese football club

- Full name: Hoa Binh Football Club; Câu lạc bộ bóng đá Hòa Bình
- Nickname: Tự hào Tây Bắc (Pride of the Northwest)
- Founded: 22 April 2021; 4 years ago
- Dissolved: 8 September 2025; 51 days ago
- Ground: Hoa Binh Stadium
- Capacity: 3,600
- Owner: Hoa Binh Football Joint Stock Company
- Chairman: Nguyễn Xuân Hiển
- Manager: Lê Quốc Vượng
- 2024–25: V.League 2, 7th of 11
- Website: www.hoabinhfc.vn
Home colours	Away colours

Hoa Binh Football Club (Vietnamese: Câu lạc bộ bóng đá Hòa Binh), was a Vietnamese professional football club based in Hòa Bình ward, Phú Thọ province, Vietnam. The club most recently competed in the V.League 2 before withdrawing from the league.

On 6 September 2025, Hoa Binh changed their name to Phu Tho FC. But only two days after the name change, the club withdrew from the Vietnamese professional football system due to financial reasons.

== History ==
Hòa Bình FC was officially unveiled on 22 April 2021 with the motto Tự hào Tây Bắc (English: Pride of the Northwest)". The club named former Vietnamese under-23 international Lê Quốc Vượng as their inaugural manager. After purchasing the slot of Bến Tre based club Triệu Minh, Hòa Bình began to compete in the 2021 Vietnamese Second Division. Their debut official match was played on 4 May 2021 against Hải Nam Vĩnh Yên Vĩnh Phúc.

Hòa Bình gained promotion to the 2023 V.League 2 in their second season after defeating Đồng Nai 3–0 in the promotion play-offs of the 2022 Second Division.

=== Name change and immediate downfall ===
On 6 September 2025, after Hòa Bình province was merged to Phú Thọ province, the club's name change to Phú Thọ FC was approved. However, two days after the name change, the club failed to reach a common agreement with their main sponsor. As the result, the club declared forfeit from the 2025–26 V.League 2, and was ejected from the Vietnam professional football level.

== Stadium ==
Until the end of the 2024–25 season, the club played their home matches at Hoa Binh Stadium. Their training grounds was located in the Lương Sơn district. After the name change to Phú Thọ FC on 6 September 2025, the club planned to move their home stadium to Việt Trì Stadium.

== Current squad ==
As of 13 April 2025

Note: Flags indicate national team as defined under FIFA eligibility rules; some limited exceptions apply. Players may hold more than one non-FIFA nationality.

No.	Pos.	Nation	Player
1	GK	VIE	Chu Văn Tấn (on loan from Sông Lam Nghệ An)
2	DF	VIE	Đinh Viết Lộc
3	DF	VIE	Hà Châu Phi (on loan from Đông Á Thanh Hóa)
8	MF	VIE	Hoàng Anh Tuấn
10	MF	CAN	Trần Khánh Hưng (on loan from PVF-CAND)
12	FW	VIE	Phùng Văn Nam (on loan from Sông Lam Nghệ An)
18	DF	VIE	Nguyễn Văn Thủy
20	MF	VIE	Phạm Nguyễn Quốc Trung (on loan from Sông Lam Nghệ An)
26	GK	VIE	Nguyễn Tiến Tạo
29	DF	VIE	Tiêu Trung Hiếu (on loan from Thể Công-Viettel)
37	MF	VIE	Trương Văn Tuyển (on loan from Sông Lam Nghệ An)

No.	Pos.	Nation	Player
41	DF	VIE	Hoàng Tiến Dũng
66	GK	VIE	Nguyễn Minh Kha (on loan from PVF)
77	FW	VIE	Nguyễn Hoàng Chiến (on loan from Hồ Chí Minh City)
82	DF	VIE	Nguyễn Đình Đức (on loan from Thể Công-Viettel)
88	MF	VIE	Đặng Ngọc Đức
99	DF	VIE	Nguyễn Trọng Kiệt
—	DF	VIE	Lại Văn Tú (on loan from Đông Á Thanh Hóa)
—	DF	VIE	Nguyễn Tấn Minh (on loan from Sông Lam Nghệ An)
—	DF	VIE	Trần Đức Bình (on loan from Công An Hà Nội)
—	MF	VIE	Lê Bá Nam (on loan from Đông Á Thanh Hóa)
—	MF	VIE	Nguyễn Hiền Lương (on loan from Công An Hà Nội)

== Current staff ==
Position	Name
Manager	(Vietnam) Lê Quốc Vượng
Assistant Managers	(Vietnam) Nguyễn Hoài Nam
First-Team Coach	(Vietnam) Nguyễn Trọng Giáp (Vietnam) Nguyễn Văn Hoán
Team Officer	(Vietnam) Cao Thành An (Vietnam) Lê Đình Minh (Vietnam) Nguyễn Tuấn Anh
