= Núi Thành =

Núi Thành Xã Núi Thành
- Commune
- Núi Thành commune
- Location within Vietnam
- Coordinates: 15°25′53″N 108°39′18″E
- Country: Vietnam
- Region: South Central Coast
- Province: Đà Nẵng

Area
  - Total: 176 sq mi (457 km^{2})

Population (2019)
  - Total: 12.902
  - Density: 7.31/sq mi (2.823/km^{2})
- Time zone: UTC+7 (UTC + 7)

Núi Thành is a commune (xã) of Đà Nẵng, Vietnam.
