= Xuan Thien Phu Tho FC =

Vietnamese football club

- Full name: Xuan Thien Phu Tho Football Club (Câu lạc bộ bóng đá Xuân Thiện Phú Thọ)
- Founded: 5 March 2019; 7 years ago
- Ground: Việt Trì Stadium
- Capacity: 20,000
- Owner: Xuan Thien Group
- Chairman: Vũ Văn Nga
- Manager: Lê Quốc Vượng
- League: V.League 2
- 2025–26: V.League 2, 5th of 12
- Website: facebook.com
Home colours

Xuan Thien Phu Tho Football Club (Vietnamese: Câu lạc bộ bóng đá Xuân Thiện Phú Thọ), formerly known as Gia Định, is a Vietnamese football club based in Phú Thọ. The club is playing its home matches at the 20,000-capacity Việt Trì Stadium. The club competes in the V.League 2, following promotion after finishing second in their group in the 2025 Vietnamese Second Division.

== History ==
=== Gia Định era ===
In 2019, Gia Định Football Club was established and used Củ Chi Stadium as their home stadium. As their first season, Gia Dinh participated in the Vietnamese Second Division after purchasing the participation slot of Hoàng Sang. Gia Định was drawn on Group B with Bình Thuận, Bà Rịa-Vũng Tàu, Long An, Tiền Giang, Bến Tre and Vĩnh Long; they finished second on their group, and lost 5–4 during their penalty shootout after a 0–0 draw during the promotion play-off semi-finals. In the following season, Gia Định finish first in their group in the Second Division, thus gaining promotion to the 2021 V.League 2. However, the club later withdrew to play in the V.League 2, due to not meeting the requirements to participate in the league as they lack a standardized stadium and a youth academy.

Gia Định remained in the Second Division for three more seasons, before selling their league slot to Bắc Ninh in 2024. In the same year, the club started over in the Vietnamese Third Division and finish as group winner in the league, thus return to the Second Division.

In the 2025 season, Gia Định was promoted to the 2025–26 V.League 2 after finishing runner-up in Group B due to superior head-to-head points compared to Lâm Đồng at the end of the season.

=== Name change to Xuân Thiện Phú Thọ ===
On 11 September 2025, the club changed their name to Xuân Thiện Phú Thọ, moving their base from Ho Chi Minh City to Phú Thọ.

== Coaching staff ==
Position	Name
Head coach	(Vietnam) Lê Quốc Vượng
Assistant coach	(Vietnam) Nguyễn Trọng Giáp (Vietnam) Nguyễn Xuân Hùng (Vietnam) Vũ Thanh Tùng
Technical analyst	(Vietnam) Đinh Quốc Sanh (Vietnam) Nguyễn Hoài Nam
Doctor	(Vietnam) Phan Thanh Hải
Technical director	(Vietnam) Trần Tiến Đại

== Current squad ==
As of 11 September 2026

Note: Flags indicate national team as defined under FIFA eligibility rules; some limited exceptions apply. Players may hold more than one non-FIFA nationality.

No.	Pos.	Nation	Player
1	GK	VIE	Chu Văn Tấn
2	DF	VIE	Đinh Xuân Khải (on loan from Thép Xanh Nam Định)
5	DF	VIE	Võ Tiến Thắng (on loan from Sông Lam Nghệ An)
6	MF	VIE	Nguyễn Nam Trường
7	DF	VIE	Nguyễn Văn Thủy
8	MF	VIE	Đặng Ngọc Đức
9	FW	CAN	Trần Khánh Hưng (on loan from PVF)
10	MF	IRL	Brandon Ly (on loan from Công An Hà Nội)
12	MF	VIE	Nguyễn Đình Sơn (on loan from Thép Xanh Nam Định)
14	DF	VIE	Hoàng Tiến Dũng
17	MF	VIE	Nguyễn Duy Thanh
18	FW	CMR	Richmond Nji
19	DF	VIE	Phạm Hoài Dương
21	MF	VIE	Bùi Anh Đức

No.	Pos.	Nation	Player
22	DF	VIE	Hoàng Xuân Tân
25	GK	VIE	Phạm Văn Luân
26	MF	VIE	Trần Quốc Thành
27	DF	VIE	Dương Văn Kiên
37	MF	VIE	Trương Văn Tuyến (on loan from Sông Lam Nghệ An)
68	MF	VIE	Nguyễn Văn Đức
73	MF	VIE	Trần Gia Kiên
77	FW	VIE	Nguyễn Hoàng Chiến
79	MF	VIE	Trần Mạnh Hùng
81	MF	VIE	Đoàn Thanh Trường
86	MF	VIE	Trần Gia Huy
88	DF	VIE	Nguyễn Tấn Minh (on loan from Sông Lam Nghệ An)
91	GK	VIE	Nguyễn Tiến Tạo
