= Lê Quốc Vượng =

Vietnamese footballer (born 1982)

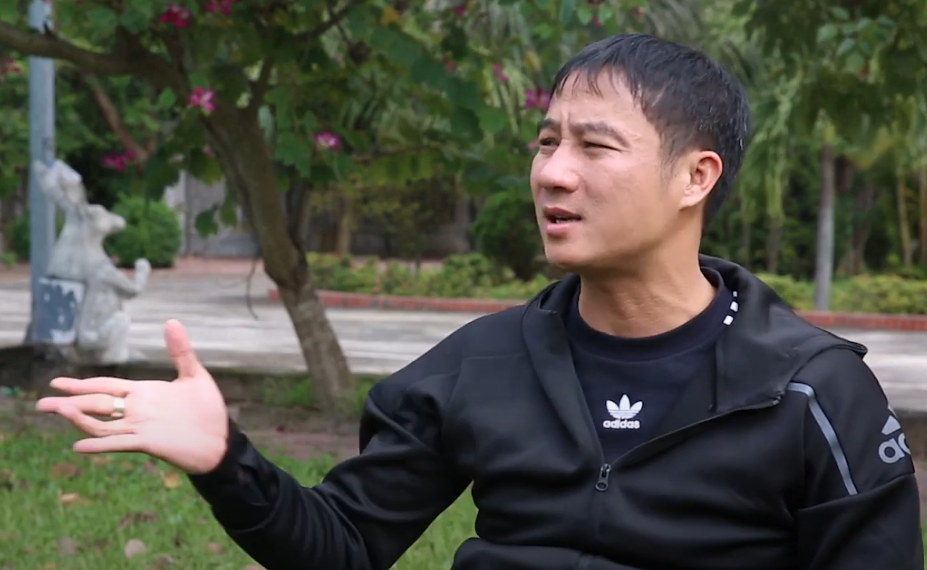
- Quốc Vượng in 2019

Personal information
- Date of birth: 20 February 1982 (age 44)
- Place of birth: Vinh, Vietnam
- Position: Central midfielder

Youth career
- 1996–2003: Sông Lam Nghệ An

Senior career*
Years	Team	Apps	(Gls)
2003	→ Hoàng Anh Gia Lai (loan)		
2004–2005	Sông Lam Nghệ An		
2009	Thể Công		
2010–2011	Xuân Thành Hà Tĩnh		
2012	Thanh Hóa		

International career
2003–2005	Vietnam U-23		
2003–2004	Vietnam		

Managerial career
- 2020: Hải Phòng (assistant coach)
- 2021–2022: Hòa Bình
- 2023: Hồng Lĩnh Hà Tĩnh (assistant coach)
- 2024–2025: Hòa Bình
- 2025–: Xuân Thiện Phú Thọ
- * Club domestic league appearances and goals

Lê Quốc Vượng (born 20 February 1982) is a Vietnamese former footballer and manager who played as a central midfielder. He is currently the head coach of Xuân Thiện Phú Thọ.

== Early life ==
Quốc Vượng was born and raised in Vinh. His father, Lê Văn Quang, was a former footballer for Sông Lam Nghệ An around in the 1980s, who dedicated his love for football to his son Quốc Vượng. Quốc Vượng used to live just a few hundred meters from Vinh Stadium, where he practiced weekly. In 1996, Nguyễn Hồng Thanh, the president of Sông Lam Nghệ An, officially established the team's youth academy and Quốc Vượng was one of the first youth players to join.

== Club career ==
=== Hoang Anh Gia Lai (loan) ===
In 2003, as Sông Lam Nghệ An had too many midfielders, they decided to loan Quốc Vượng to Hoàng Anh Gia Lai. With the club, he won the 2003 V-League.

=== Sông Lam Nghệ An ===
After completing his loan at Hoàng Anh Gia Lai, Quốc Vượng returned to Sông Lam Nghệ An and played for two seasons before being sentenced to prison due to match-fixing.

=== Thể Công ===
In 2009, after 3 years in prison, Quốc Vượng transferred to Thể Công for a fee of 300 million VND. However, frequent injuries limited his playing time. At the end of the 2010 season, he became a free agent.

=== Xuân Thành Hà Tĩnh ===
In March 2010, Quốc Vượng transferred to First Division club Xuân Thành Hà Tĩnh Cement with a 5 billion VND signing fee for a 3-year contract. After failing to win promotion to V.League, the club almost dissolved, and Quốc Vượng said he wanted to leave the club as soon as possible.

=== Thanh Hóa ===
At the beginning of the 2012 season, Quốc Vượng joined Thanh Hóa with a 3-year contract and a total signing fee of 2.3 billion VND. After five rounds in the league, Thanh Hóa terminated Quốc Vượng's contract due to concerns about his undisciplined behavior. The club requested that Quốc Vượng return 400 million VND, but he refused. This led to a lawsuit that lasted until 2013 – the outcome was not disclosed.

== International career ==
Quốc Vượng was called up for the Vietnam U-23 in the 2003 and the 2005 SEA Games.

=== Match-fixing scandal ===
On the afternoon of 24 November 2005 (before the Vietnam-Myanmar match in 2005 SEA Games), Quốc Vượng met with 7 teammates to propose that if Vietnam won by one goal against Myanmar, they would be given 20 to 30 million VND each. The whole group agreed to follow Quốc Vượng's plan.

This case was tried by the Ho Chi Minh City People's Court on 25 January 2007, and appealed on 20 April 2007. Quốc Vượng was sentenced to 4 years in prison for being the mastermind behind the match-fixing.

== Managerial career ==
In 2019, Quốc Vượng officially received a C coach license from the AFC.

In 2020, he was invited by coach Phạm Anh Tuấn to work as an assistant coach for Hải Phòng, but left after the end of the season.

At the beginning of 2021, Quốc Vượng was appointed as manager for Hòa Bình, a new club that was established in the same year.

After a successful 2023 season for Hòa Bình in the V.League 2, helping the club finish 4th, he signed for V.League 1 club Hồng Lĩnh Hà Tính as an assistant coach. In the 2023-24 season, Hồng Lĩnh Hà Tĩnh avoided relegation in the league after defeating PVF–CAND in the relegation/promotion play-off game.

In 2024, Quốc Vượng returned to Hòa Bình as a manager.

== Personal life ==
In 2012, Quốc Vượng married Đoàn Phương Thúy. They have three children together.

== Honours ==
Hoàng Anh Gia Lai

- V.League: 2003

Vietnam U23

- SEA Games silver medal: 2003, 2005
