= Vinh Long FC =

Vietnamese football club

Vĩnh Long
- Full name: Câu lạc bộ bóng đá Vĩnh Long
- Ground: Vĩnh Long Stadium, Vĩnh Long, Vĩnh Long Province, Vietnam
- Capacity: 10,000
- Chairman: Nguyễn Minh Hiền
- League: Vietnamese Second Division
- 2026: Vietnamese Second Division, 6th of 7 (Group B)
Home colours	Away colours

Câu lạc bộ bóng đá Vĩnh Long, simply known as Vĩnh Long, is a Vietnamese football club based in Vĩnh Long, Vĩnh Long Province, Vietnam. They are now playing in Second Division.

The club's greatest success has been its two seasons in the first division, the V.League 1, in 1997 and 1999-00.

The team is currently playing at Vĩnh Long Stadium.

== History ==
The 1999–2000 season marked the club's final appearance in V.League 1. On March 8, 2000, in the 94th minute of the match against Dong Thap, Vinh Long goalkeeper Ngô Hoàng Kiệt committed a foul against Nguyễn Tấn Thành inside the penalty area, resulting in a penalty awarded for the opponent. Believing that the decision was not correct, the goalkeeper, along with some other Vinh Long players and staff, started chasing the referee without success. The team then refused to continue the match until it was finally abandoned with the score at 1-1. Hours later, VFF called an emergency meeting and decided to expel Vinh Long from all competitions and demote them to the Vietnamese Second Division.

== Current squad ==
As of 30 March 2026 Note: Flags indicate national team as defined under FIFA eligibility rules; some limited exceptions apply. Players may hold more than one non-FIFA nationality.

No.	Pos.	Nation	Player
4		VIE	Lê Thanh Khánh
6		VIE	Đỗ Minh Thuận
7		VIE	Lê Nhật Hào
8		VIE	Trần Phát Tài
9		VIE	Võ Hoàng Hưng
10		VIE	Đặng Văn Dương
11		VIE	Nguyễn Khánh Duy
14		VIE	Nguyễn Sơn Kiệt
17		VIE	Huỳnh Nguyễn Du
18		VIE	Nguyễn Thành Nhân
20		VIE	Lê Tấn Tài
21		VIE	Lê Đức Huy
22		VIE	Hà Hoàng Danh

No.	Pos.	Nation	Player
24	GK	VIE	Dương Sỹ Hoàng
25	GK	VIE	Lê Hiếu Nhơn
26		VIE	Nguyễn Huỳnh Đăng Khoa
27		VIE	Đinh Sỹ Sơn
28		VIE	Bùi Hải Đăng
32	GK	VIE	Nguyễn Quốc Khải
45		VIE	Lê Huỳnh Trung Hiếu
66		VIE	Trần Tuấn Thanh
74		VIE	Phan Minh Kỳ
77		VIE	Nguyễn Anh Minh
88		VIE	Lê Hoàng Dương
99		VIE	Nguyễn Minh Nhựt

== Honours ==
=== National competitions ===
League

- Third Division:

(gold) Champions : 2012 (tie)
(silver) Runners-up : 2003

== Recent managers ==
Recent managers of the club:

Manager	Start	Finish
(China) Tề Sùng Lập	1999	2000
(Vietnam) Lương Trung Dân	2000	2000
(South Korea) Han Young Kuk	13 January 2012	October 2013
(Vietnam) Lưu Quốc Tân	2013	2014
(Vietnam) Nguyễn Ngô Huy Phúc	2015	2016
(Vietnam) Nguyễn Minh Cảnh	16 June 2016	2019
(Vietnam) Phạm Công Lộc	2020	2020
(Vietnam) Nguyễn Minh Cảnh	2021	2025
(Vietnam) Trương Phi	2026	Present
