= 2022 Vietnamese Cup =

BAF Meat National Cup 2022

Tournament details
- Country: Vietnam
- Dates: 5 April – 27 November 2022
- Teams: 25

Final positions
- Champions: Hanoi (3rd title)
- Runners-up: Topenland Binh Dinh

Tournament statistics
- Matches played: 24
- Goals scored: 67 (2.79 per match)
- Top goal scorer(s): (Vietnam) Ngô Hồng Phước (Vietnam) Nguyễn Hữu Sơn (3 goals)

The 2022 Vietnamese Cup (Vietnamese: Giải bóng đá Cúp Quốc gia 2022), known as the BaF Meat-National Cup 2022 for sponsorship reasons, was the 30th edition of the Vietnamese National Cup, the football knockout tournament of Vietnam organized by the Vietnam Football Federation.

The tournament followed the cancellation of the 2021 edition due to COVID-19 safety concerns. Hanoi successfully defended its 2020 title by defeating for its 3rd successive title in the final Topenland Binh Dinh, 2–0. The champion would automatically qualify in the 2023–24 AFC Champions League playoff round as well as the 2023 Vietnamese Super Cup.

== Access ==
25 teams from both V.League 1 and V.League 2 contested; 7 teams receiving a bye to Round 2 (with Hoang Anh Gia Lai and Viettel FC qualified for AFC Club Competitions in 2022 and 5 other teams following a random draw).

| | Clubs entering in this round | Clubs advancing from previous round | Number of games |
|---|---|---|---|
| First round (18 clubs) | 7 clubs from V.League 1; 11 clubs from V.League 2 | N/A | 9 |
| Round of 16 (16 clubs) | 1 club from V.League 2; 6 club from V.League 1 | 9 winners from first round | 8 |
| Quarter-finals (8 clubs) | No clubs enter the quarter-finals | 8 winners from Second round | 4 |
| Semi-finals (4 clubs) | No clubs enter the semi-finals | 4 winners from quarter-finals | 2 |
| Final (2 clubs) | No clubs enter the final | 2 winners from semi-finals | 1 |

== First round ==
| 5 April 2022 | Quang Nam (2) | 1–0 | Becamex Binh Duong (1) | Tam Ky |
| 17:00 | Van Dai 79' | Report | | Stadium: Tam Ky; Attendance: 1,500; Referee: Khổng Tam Cường |

| 5 April 2022 | Hong Linh Ha Tinh (1) | 3–2 | Nam Dinh (1) | Ha Tinh |
| 18:00 | Nhat Minh 31', 54'; Van Long 76' | Report | Alisson 17'; Rodrigo Dias 83' | Stadium: Ha Tinh; Attendance: 2,000; Referee: Lê Đức Cảnh |

| 6 April 2022 | Hue (2) | 0–5 | Saigon (1) | Hue |
| 16:00 | | Report | Huu Son 12', 63'; Cong Hien 26'; Van Trien 64'; Viet Phong 76' | Stadium: Tu Do; Attendance: 3,000; Referee: Đặng Quốc Dũng |

| 6 April 2022 | Long An (2) | 1–0 | Khanh Hoa (2) | Tan An |
| 17:00 | Hoang Anh 41' | Report | | Stadium: Long An; Attendance: 300; Referee: Trần Văn Trọng |

| 7 April 2022 | Pho Hien (2) | 5–0 | Phu Tho (2) | Van Giang |
| 18:00 | Ngoc Son 15'; Van Do 28'; Huu Nam 63'; Nguyen Hoang 69'; Trung Hieu 81' | Report | | Stadium: PVF; Attendance: 400; Referee: Nguyễn Mạnh Hải |

| 7 April 2022 | Binh Phuoc (2) | 2–1 | Song Lam Nghe An (1) | Dong Xoai |
| 17:00 | Hong Phuoc 55'; Kien Cuong 57' | Report | Phuc Tinh 76' | Stadium: Binh Phuoc; Attendance: 2,500; Referee: Duong Huu Phuc |

| 7 April 2022 | Phu Dong (2) | 1–3 | Haiphong (1) | Hanoi |
| 15:30 | Thanh Tai 11' | Report | Hai Huy 13'; Thanh Dong 85'; Minh Hieu 90+4' | Stadium: Thanh Tri; Attendance: 0 Referee: Vu Phuc Hoan |

| 7 April 2022 | Can Tho (2) | 3–1 | Dak Lak (2) | Can Tho |
| 18:00 | Thanh Hai 47'; Thanh Tung 85'; Khac Khiem 90+1' | Report | Gia Hung 89' | Stadium: Can Tho; Attendance: 2,000; Referee: Tran Ngoc Nho |

| 7 April 2022 | Hanoi (1) | 4–0 | Cong An Nhan Dan (2) | Hanoi |
| 19:15 | Tuan Hai 38' (pen.), 63'; Viet Anh 62'; Van Quyet 90+3' | Report | | Stadium: Hang Day; Attendance: 5,000; Referee: Hoang Thanh Binh |

== Round of 16 ==
| 9 April 2022 | Hoang Anh Gia Lai (1) | 0–0 (5–3 p) | Hong Linh Ha Tinh (1) | Pleiku |
| 17:00 | | Report | | Stadium: Pleiku; Attendance: 5000; Referee: Truong Hong Vu |

| 10 April 2022 | Dong A Thanh Hoa (1) | 4–0 | Long An (2) | Thanh Hoa |
| 17:00 | Trong Hung 25'; Tien Dung 45+1'; Lam 58'; Van Thang 60' | Report | | Stadium: Thanh Hoa; Attendance: 5000; Referee: Nguyen Dinh Thai |

| 10 April 2022 | Ho Chi Minh City (1) | 1–1 (3–4 p) | Saigon (1) | Ho Chi Minh City |
| 19:15 | Tuan Tai 41' | Report | Huu Son 5' | Stadium: Thong Nhat; Attendance: 3000; Referee: Do Thanh De |

| 11 April 2022 | Binh Phuoc (2) | 3–0 | Quang Nam (2) | Dong Xoai |
| 17:00 | Hong Phuoc 12', 57'; Thanh Phong 72' | Report | | Stadium: Binh Phuoc; Attendance: 1500; Referee: Tran Van Trong |

| 11 April 2022 | SHB Da Nang (1) | 1–2 | Hanoi (1) | Cam Le |
| 17:00 | Dinh Duy 48' | Report | Thai Quy 87'; Siladi 90+1' | Stadium: Hoa Xuan; Attendance: 5000; Referee: Nguyen Manh Hai |

| 11 April 2022 | Topenland Binh Dinh (1) | 1–0 | Haiphong (1) | Quy Nhon |
| 18:00 | Schmidt 90+4' | Report | | Stadium: Quy Nhon; Attendance: 3000; Referee: Tran Van Lap |

| 11 April 2022 | Ba Ria Vung Tau (2) | 0–0 (4–2 p) | Pho Hien (2) | Ba Ria |
| 18:00 | | Report | | Stadium: Ba Ria; Attendance: 3000; Referee: Le Vu Linh |

| 11 April 2022 | Viettel (1) | 5–0 | Can Tho (2) | Hanoi |
| 19:15 | Manh Dung 39', 46'; Duy Thuong 64'; Van Hao 88'; Hoang Minh 90+1' | Report | | Stadium: Hang Day; Attendance: 800; Referee: Nguyen Viet Duan |

== Quarter-finals ==
| 7 September 2022 | Dong A Thanh Hoa (1) | 3–1 | Ba Ria Vung Tau (2) | Thanh Hoa |
| 17:00 | Hoàng Đình Tùng 26'; Lê Văn Thắng 55', 80' | Report | Nguyễn Văn Thạnh 26' | Stadium: Thanh Hoa; Attendance: 4.000 |

| 7 September 2022 | Hoang Anh Gia Lai (1) | 1–1 (5–3 p) | Saigon (1) | Pleiku |
| 18:00 | Bruno 72' | Report | Nguyễn Hữu Sơn 65' | Stadium: Pleiku; Attendance: 3.000 |
| | Penalties |
| | Văn Thanh (penalty scored); Đông Triều (penalty scored); Bruno (penalty scored); Công Phượng (penalty scored); Brandão (penalty scored) | | Matheus (penalty scored); Rodrigue Nanitelamio (penalty missed); Lâm Thuận (penalty scored); Công Thành (penalty scored) |

| 8 September 2022 | Binh Phuoc (2) | 0–5 | Hanoi (1) | Dong Xoai |
| 17:00 | | Report | Tuấn Hải 2'; Văn Tùng 12'; Duy Mạnh 68'; Văn Quyết 79', 85' | Stadium: Binh Phuoc; Attendance: 6.000 |

| 8 September 2022 | Viettel (1) | 0–0 (3–5 p) | Topenland Binh Dinh (1) | Hanoi |
| 19:15 | | Report | | Stadium: Hang Day; Attendance: 3.000 |
| | Penalties |
| | Tiến Dũng (penalty scored); Geovane (penalty scored); Khắc Ngọc (penalty missed); Hoàng Đức (penalty scored) | | Rafaelson (penalty scored); Đức Chinh (penalty scored); Tấn Tài (penalty scored); Xuân Tú (penalty scored); Jermie Lynch (penalty scored) |

== Semi-finals ==
| 23 November 2022 | Topenland Binh Dinh (1) | 4–0 | Dong A Thanh Hoa (1) | Quy Nhon |
| 17:00 | | | | Stadium: Quy Nhon |

| 23 November 2022 | Hoang Anh Gia Lai (1) | 0–2 | Hanoi (1) | Pleiku |
| 17:00 | | | Lucão 37', 59' | Stadium: Pleiku |

== Finals ==
| 27 November 2022 | Hanoi (1) | 2–0 | Topenland Binh Dinh (1) | Hanoi |
| 17:00 | Đoàn Văn Hậu 48'; Trương Văn Thái Quý 81' | | | Stadium: Hàng Đẫy Stadium |

== Brackets ==
First round
5 April 2022
Hong Linh Ha Tinh (1) | 3
Nam Dinh (1) | 2
6 April 2022
Hue (2) | 0
Saigon (1) | 5
7 April 2022
Binh Phuoc (2) | 2
Song Lam Nghe An (1) | 1
5 April 2022
Quang Nam (2) | 1
Becamex Binh Duong (1) | 0
7 April 2022
Hanoi (1) | 4
Cong An Nhan Dan (2) | 0
7 April 2022
Can Tho (2) | 3
Dak Lak (2) | 1
7 April 2022
Phu Dong (2) | 1
Haiphong (1) | 3
6 April 2022
Long An (2) | 1
Khanh Hoa (2) | 0
7 April 2022
Pho Hien (2) | 5
Phu Tho (2) | 0

Round of 16
9 April 2022
Hoang Anh Gia Lai (1) | 0 (5)
Hong Linh Ha Tinh (1) | 0 (3)
10 April 2022
Ho Chi Minh City (1) | 1 (3)
Saigon (1) | 1 (4)
11 April 2022
Binh Phuoc (2) | 3
Quang Nam (2) | 0
11 April 2022
SHB Da Nang (1) | 1
Hanoi (1) | 2
11 April 2022
Viettel (1) | 5
Can Tho (2) | 0
11 April 2022
Topenland Binh Dinh (1) | 1
Haiphong (1) | 0
10 April 2022
Dong A Thanh Hoa (1) | 4
Long An (2) | 0
11 April 2022
Ba Ria Vung Tau (2) | 0 (4)
Pho Hien (2) | 0 (2)

Quarter-Finals
7 September 2022
Hoang Anh Gia Lai (1) | 0 (5)
Saigon (1) | 0 (3)
8 September 2022
Binh Phuoc (2) | 0
Hanoi (1) | 5
8 September 2022
Viettel (1) | 0 (3)
Topenland Binh Dinh (1) | 0 (5)
7 September 2022
Dong A Thanh Hoa (1) | 3
Ba Ria Vung Tau (2) | 1

Semi-Finals
23 November 2022
Hoang Anh Gia Lai (1) | 0
Hanoi (1) | 2
23 November 2022
Topenland Binh Dinh (1) | 4
Dong A Thanh Hoa (1) | 0

Final
27 November 2022
Hanoi (1) | 2
Topenland Binh Dinh (1) | 0

== Top Goalscorers ==
| Rank | Player | Club | Goals |
|---|---|---|---|
| 1 | (Vietnam) Nguyễn Hữu Sơn | Saigon | 4 |
| 2 | (Vietnam) Ngô Hồng Phước | Binh Phuoc | 3 |
| 2 | (Vietnam) Phạm Tuấn Hải | Hanoi | 3 |
| 3 | (Vietnam) Đào Nhật Minh | Hong Linh Ha Tinh | 2 |
| 3 | (Vietnam) Nhâm Mạnh Dũng | Viettel | 2 |
| 3 | (Vietnam) Nguyễn Văn Quyết | Hanoi | 2 |
| 3 | (Vietnam) Lê Văn Thắng | Dong A Thanh Hoa | 2 |
