= Nguyễn Hữu Sơn =

Vietnamese association football player

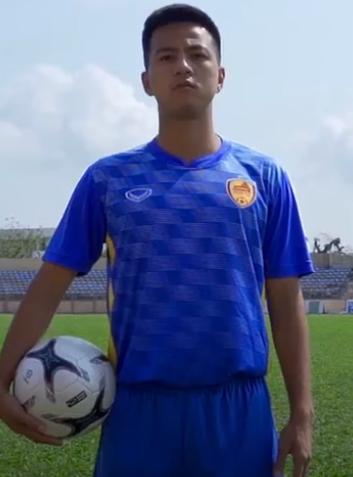
- Hữu Sơn in 2021

Personal information
- Full name: Nguyễn Hữu Sơn
- Date of birth: 27 September 1996 (age 30)
- Place of birth: Con Cuông, Nghệ An, Vietnam
- Height: 1.72 m (5 ft 8 in)
- Position: Winger

Team information
- Current team: Hải Phòng
- Number: 77

Youth career
- 2006–2012: Thái Nguyên
- 2012–2015: Hà Nội

Senior career*
Years	Team	Apps	(Gls)
2015	→ Công An Nhân Dân (loan)	13	(4)
2016–2020	Sài Gòn	67	(2)
2021	Quảng Nam	7	(2)
2021–2022	Sài Gòn	19	(1)
2022–	Hải Phòng	85	(11)
- * Club domestic league appearances and goals as of 7 June 2026

Nguyễn Hữu Sơn (born 27 September 1996) is a Vietnamese professional footballer who plays as a winger for V.League 1 club Hải Phòng.

== Early career ==
Born in Nghệ An, at the age of 14 Hữu Sơn was recruited by VSH T&T, a football academy owned by Hanoi FC. In 2014, he joined the youth team of Hanoi FC. He quickly became the core of Hanoi FC youth teams. In the 2015 Vietnamese National U19 Championship, Hữu Sơn lead Hanoi to the final game and was handled the "Best Player of the tournament" award. He was promoted to the U21 team and won the National U21 Championship for two consecutive years in 2015 and 2016.

== Club career ==
=== Sài Gòn ===
After several successes at Hanoi youth teams, Hữu Sơn was transferred to Saigon for the 2016 V.League 1 season. He had a difficult start in a professional level as he didn't have much game time during the 2016 and 2017 season. The 2018 season was a breakthrough for his career, as he became a starter for his team. Hữu Sơn started in 18 matches and scored 2 goals. In the following seasons, he received less game time, and was more often used as a rotation player. He was released by the team in 2020.

=== Quảng Nam ===
In 2021, he joined Quảng Nam in the V.League 2. He scored 2 goals after 7 matches for the team before the season got cancelled due to the effects of COVID-19 in Vietnam.

=== Return to Sài Gòn ===
Hữu Sơn came back to Sài Gòn for the 2022 season. He started regularly and scored one goal in the season but failed to save his team from a relegation as they finished in the bottom of the league. Sài Gòn was dissolved following the relegation, leaving Hữu Sơn as a free agent.

=== Hải Phòng ===
In 2023, Hữu Sơn joined Hải Phòng. He quickly gained a starter spot in the team and helped his team finish 6th in the league. He scored a goal in the 2023–24 AFC Cup in a 3–2 win against Sabah.

== International career ==
In August 2023, Hữu Sơn was called up to the Vietnam national team for the first time to prepare for the friendly match against Palestine.
