= Ngô Hồng Phước =

Vietnamese footballer (born 1998)

Personal information
- Full name: Ngô Hồng Phước
- Date of birth: 3 July 1998 (age 28)
- Place of birth: Châu Phú, An Giang, Vietnam
- Height: 1.73 m (5 ft 8 in)
- Position: Forward

Team information
- Current team: SHB Đà Nẵng
- Number: 67

Youth career
- 2016–2017: An Giang

Senior career*
Years	Team	Apps	(Gls)
2017–2019	An Giang	28	(14)
2020–2023	Becamex Bình Dương	14	(0)
2022	→ Bình Phước (loan)	3	(0)
2023–2025	Quy Nhơn Bình Định	39	(3)
2025–	SHB Đà Nẵng	6	(1)

International career
2019	Vietnam U23	2	(0)
- * Club domestic league appearances and goals as of 7 June 2026

Ngô Hồng Phước (born 3 July 1998) is a Vietnamese professional footballer who plays as a forward for V.League 1 club SHB Đà Nẵng.

== Early career ==
Hông Phước started playing football at the age of 11, representing his school football team in local amateur tournaments. In 2016, during his first year at university, he went for a try out at his city's professional team An Giang FC. After two weeks, he signed his first contract with the club and dropped out from his university to pursue a football career.

== Club career ==
He was promoted to 's first team and made his senior debut in the 2017 Vietnamese Second League. In the following season, he scored 5 goals and win a promotion to the V.League 2 with his team. In the 2019 V.League 2, his first season at professional level, Hồng Phước netted a total of 9 goals, finishing in the top 5 among the best goalscorers of the league and helped his club terminated at the fourth place in the league.

In November 2019, Hồng Phước was transferred to V.League 1 side Becamex Bình Dương, signing a three-year contract. However, he struggled to find game time due to injuries and tactical reasons. He returned to the V.League 2 in 2022, joining Bình Phước on loan but continued to have limited game time.

In September 2023, Hồng Phước joined V.League 1 fellow Quy Nhơn Bình Định as a free agent. He contributed in his team's historical runner-up campaign in the 2023–24 V.League 1.

In July 2025, following Quy Nhơn Bình Định's relegation to the V.League 2, Hồng Phước signed for SHB Đà Nẵng.
