= Con Cuông district =

Coordinates: 19.000°N 104.750°E

Con Cuông District Huyện Con Cuông
- District
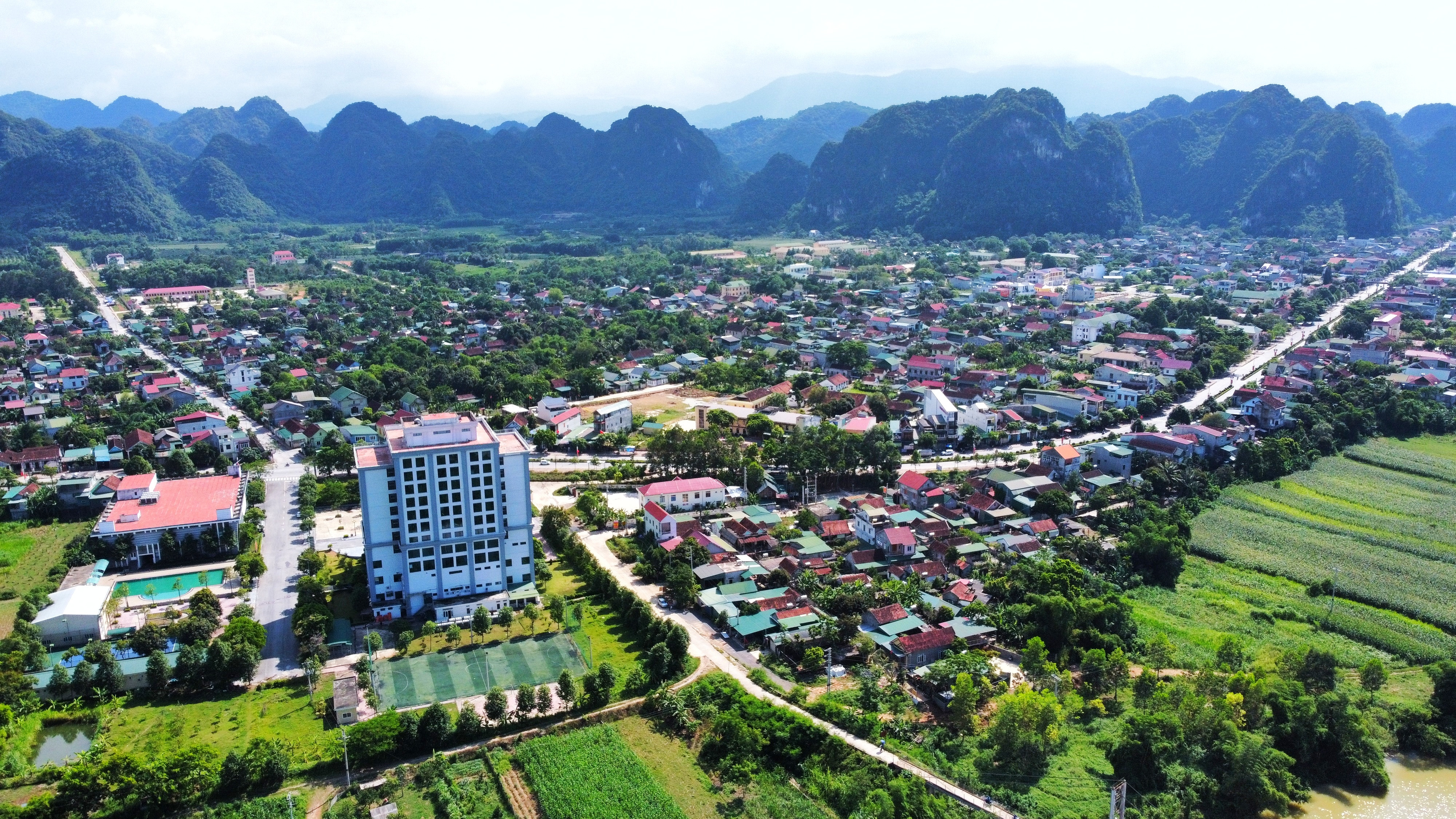
- Trà Lân town

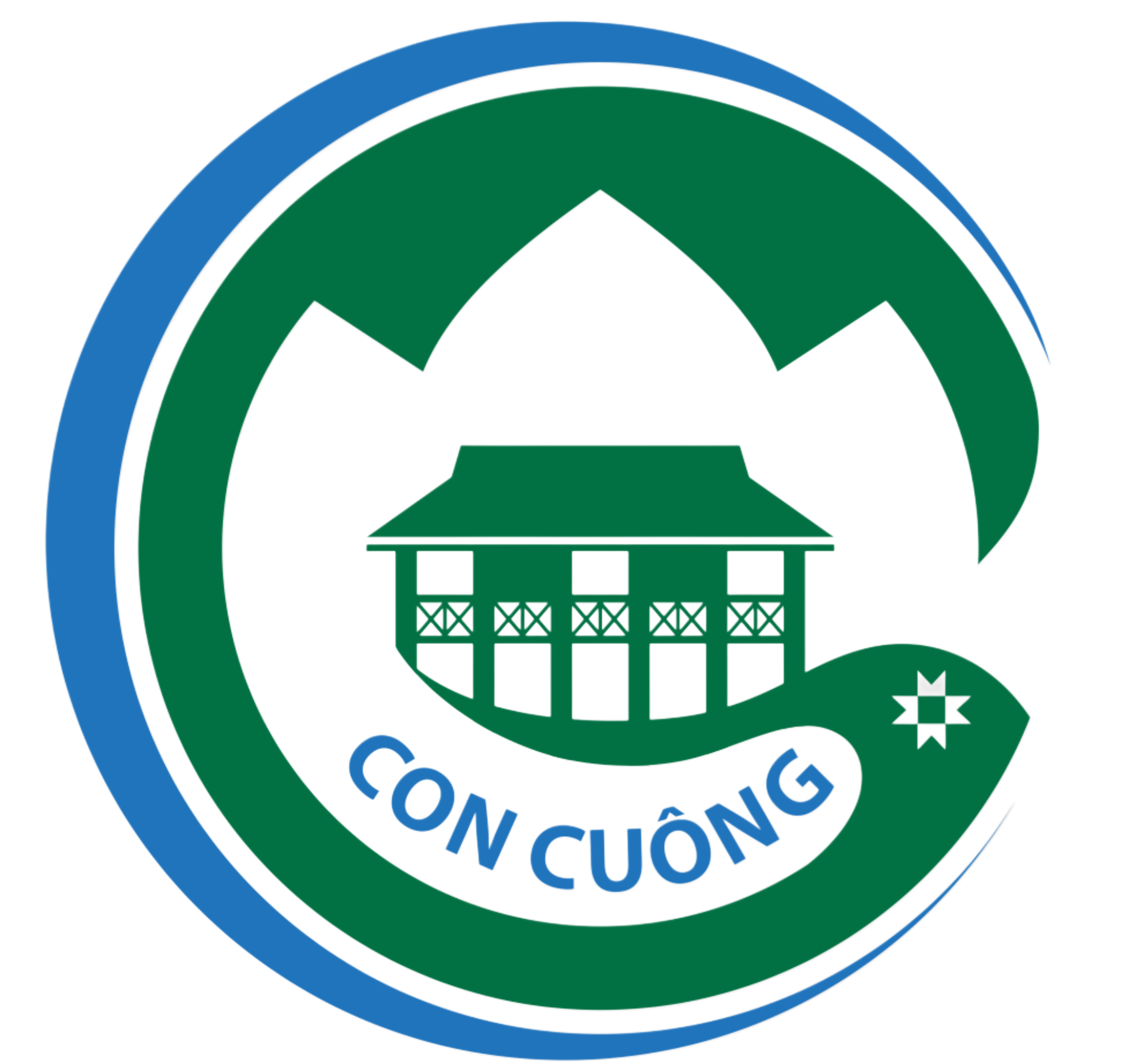
- Seal
- Interactive map of Con Cuông District
- Country: Vietnam
- Region: North Central Coast
- Province: Nghệ An
- Capital: Con Cuông

Area
  - Total: 648.7 sq mi (1,680.2 km^{2})

Population (2018)
  - Total: 78,000
- Time zone: UTC+07:00 (Indochina Time)

Con Cuông District (Vietnamese: Huyện Con Cuông / 縣昆光) is a rural district of Nghệ An Province in the Socialist Republic of Vietnam.

== Geography ==
Con Cuông District is located in the western part of Nghệ An Province, about 130 km from Vinh City. It covers an area of 1,680.2 km^{2} (648.7 sq mi) and has a population of approximately 78,000 (as of 2018). The district shares a 61.2 km border with Laos. Besides its central town, Trà Lân, there are 11 communes. Pu Mat National Park is also situated here. About 70% of the local population comprises the Thai ethnic group.

=== Topography ===
Mountains
The southern part of Con Cuông is mountainous, featuring steep hills, waterfalls, and many caves. A limestone range runs from the northwest to the southwest, with the highest point at Pu Mat (1,841 m).

Hydrology
The main river flowing through Con Cuông is the Lam River, one of the major rivers running through Nghệ An and Ha Tinh provinces. The Lam River extends about 30 kilometers within the district. In addition, smaller rivers such as the Giang River (Vietnamese: Sông Giăng), Moi River (Vietnamese: Khe Mọi), Khe Choăng (Vietnamese: Khe Choăng), and Khe Thơi (Vietnamese: Khe Thơi) also flow through the area.

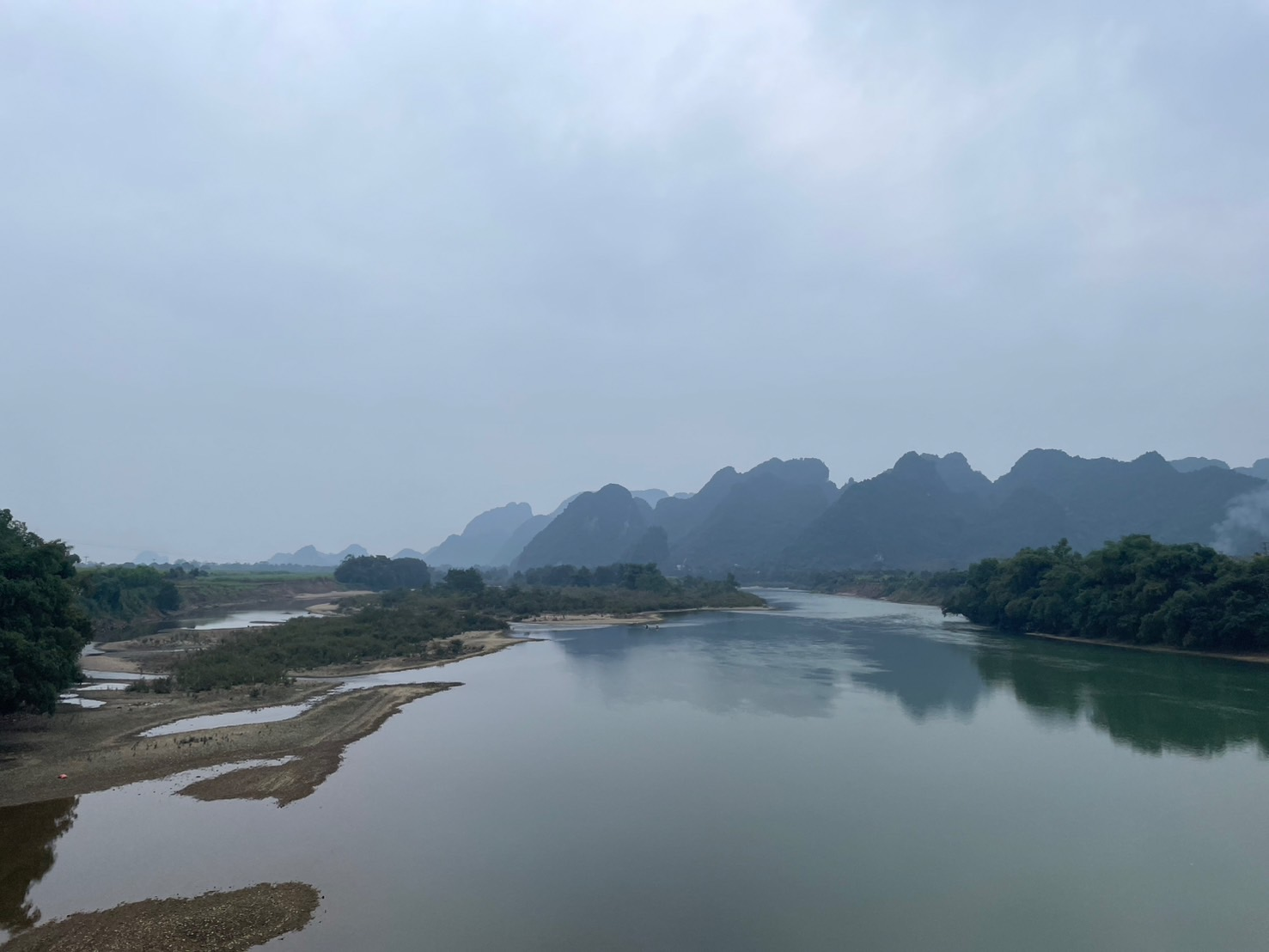
Lam River

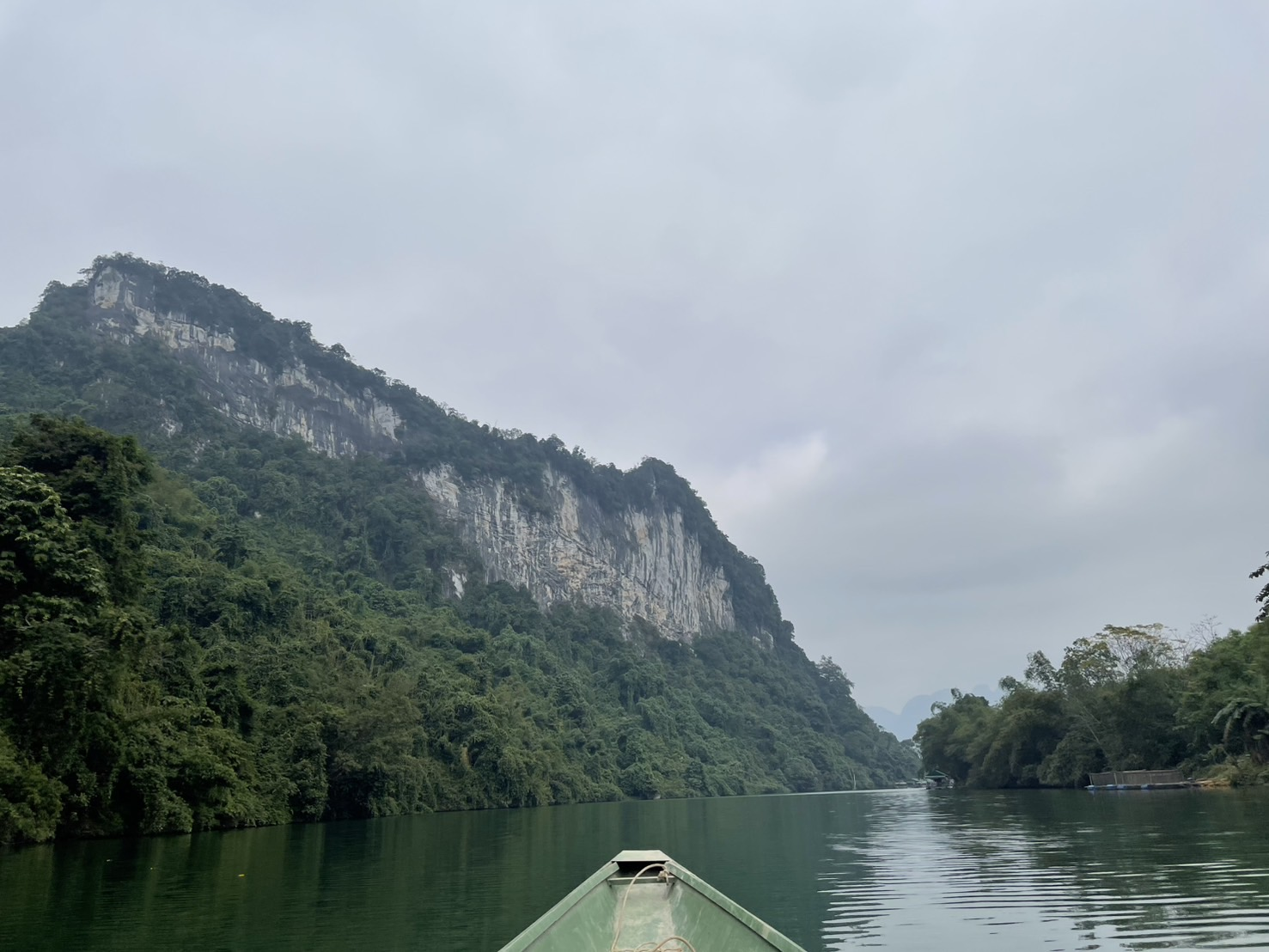
Giang River

Additional Information
Pu Mat National Park spans Con Cuông, Anh Son, and Tuong Duong Districts, with an area of 94,000 hectares located within Con Cuông District. The western part of Nghệ An Province, which includes Pu Mat National Park and Pu Huong Nature Reserve, has been designated by UNESCO as the Western Nghệ An Biosphere Reserve.

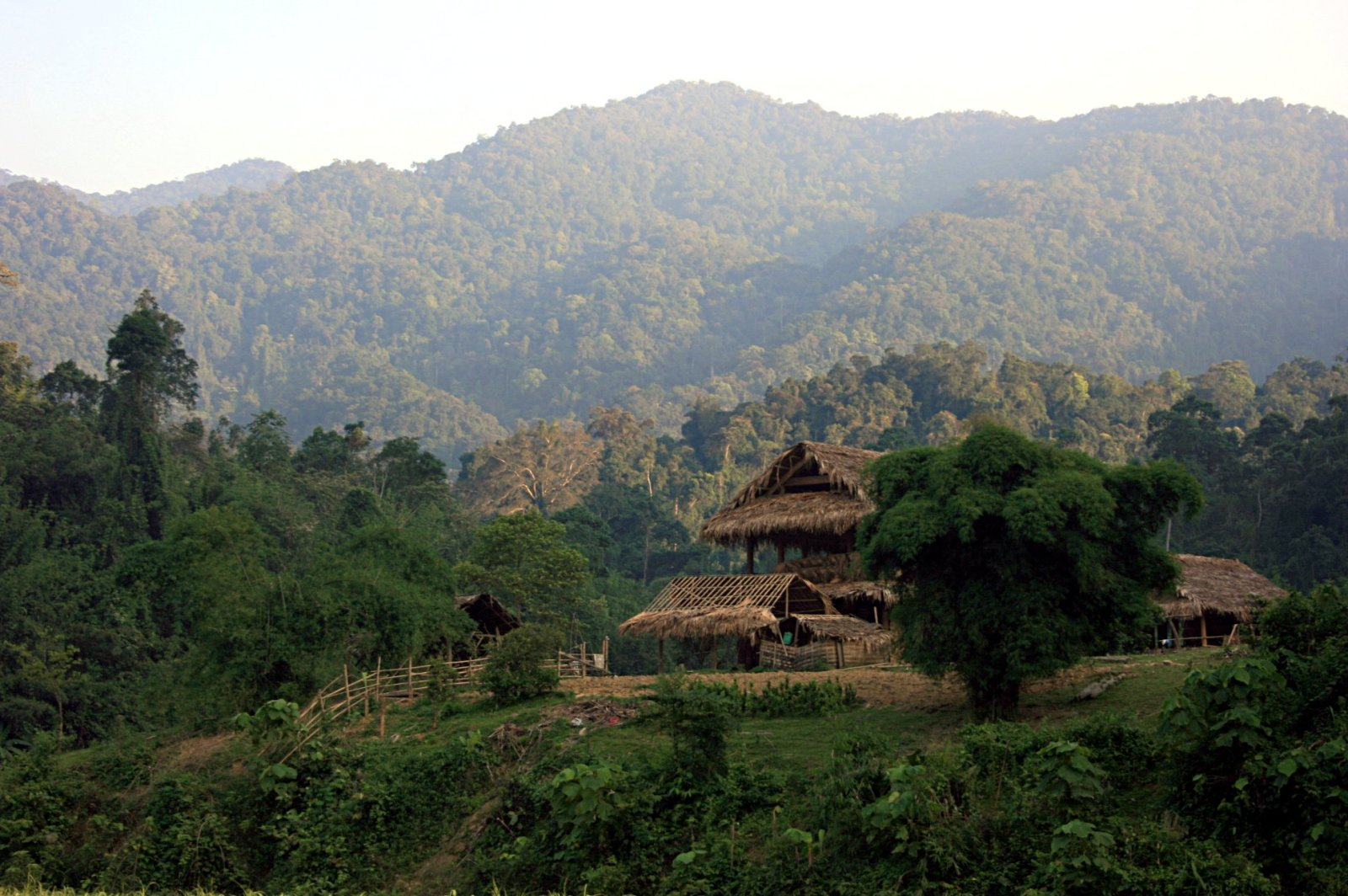
Pu Mat National Park

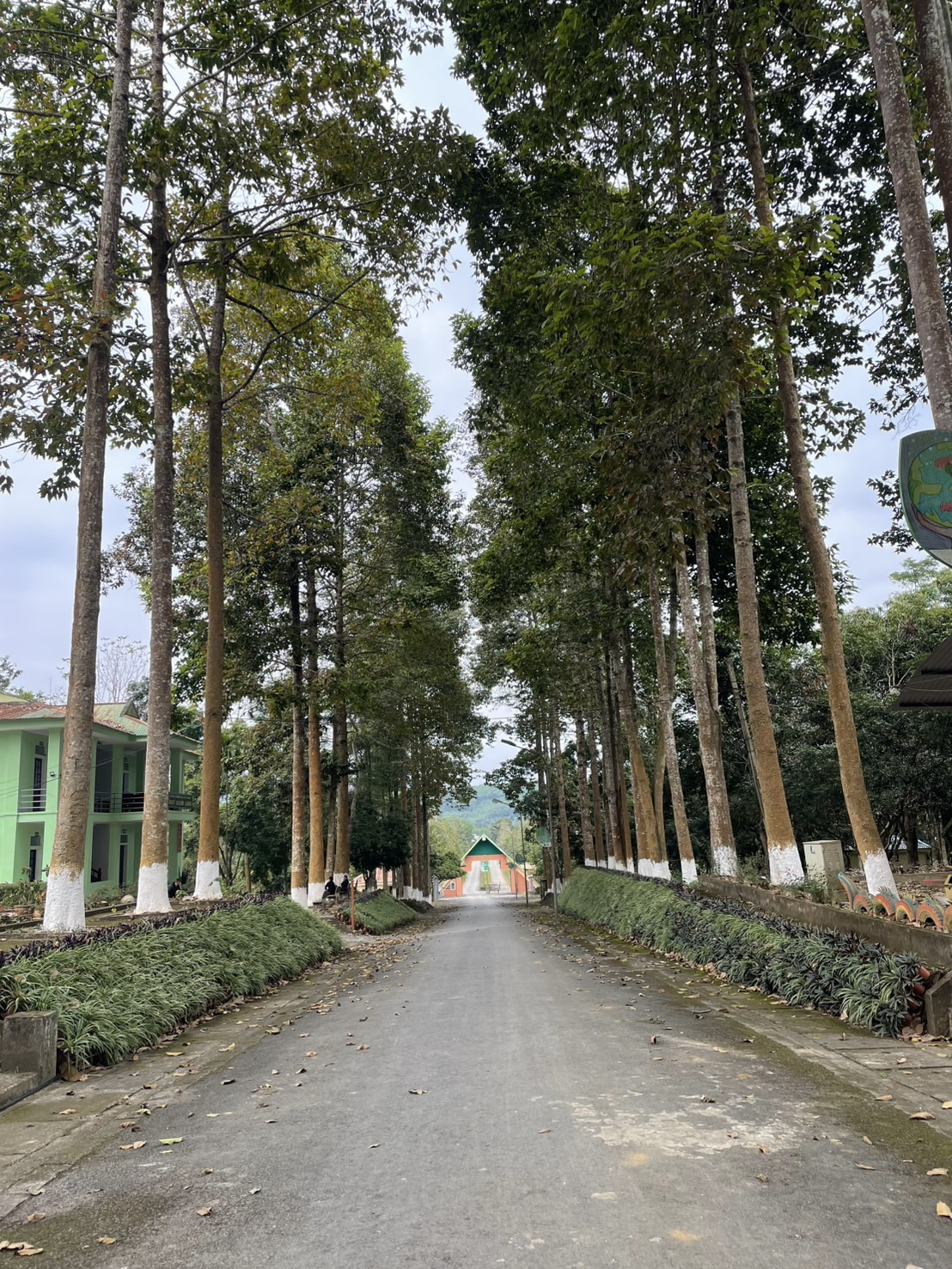
Entrance to Pu Mat National Park

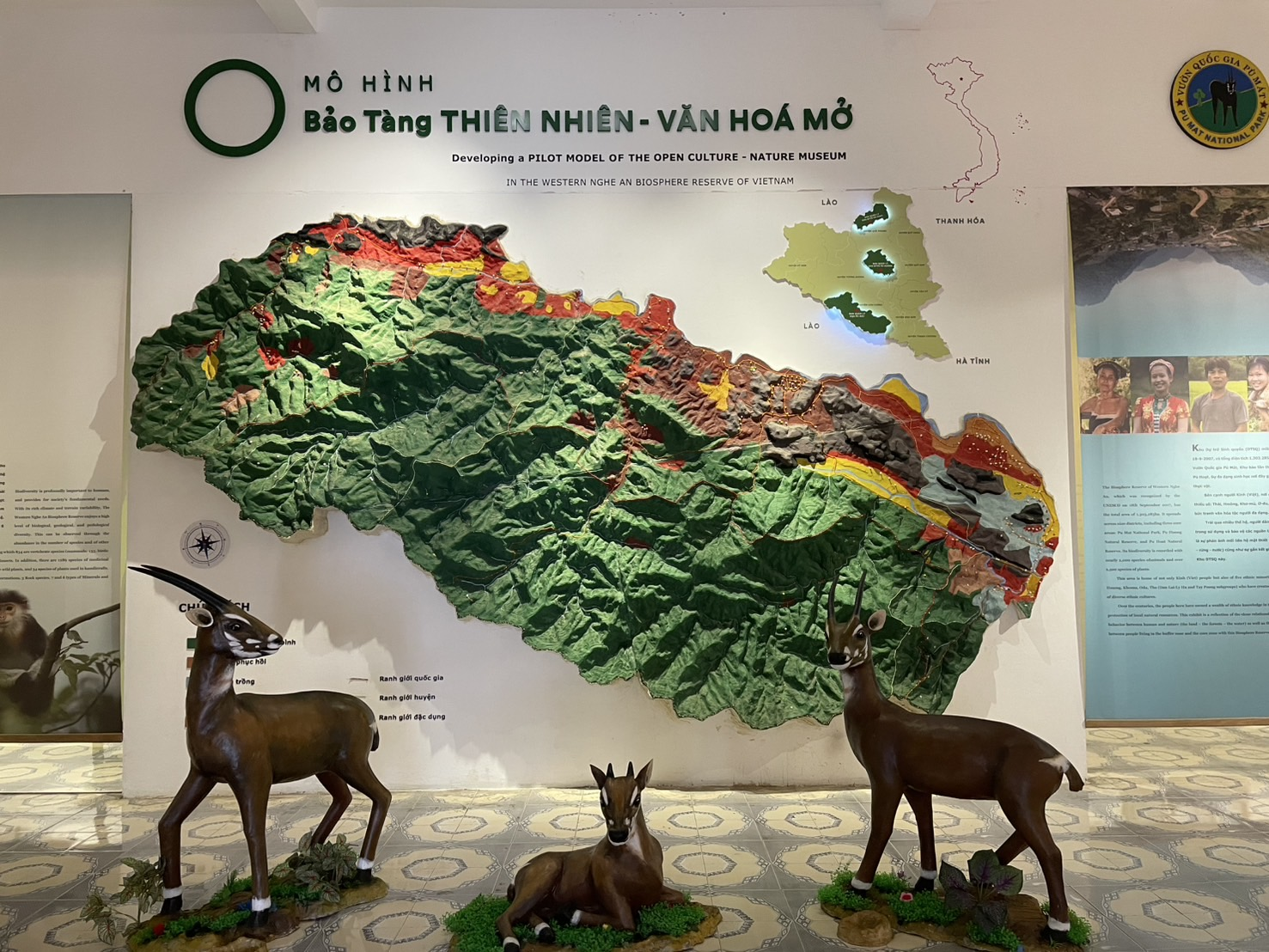
Open Nature Museum

=== Climate ===
During summer, average temperatures range from 25°C to 38°C, accompanied by hot, dry winds blowing from Laos. The rainy season lasts from May to October, with an annual precipitation exceeding 1,500 mm. The dry season spans from November to April, characterized by low rainfall and the influence of northeastern monsoons, causing temperatures to drop close to 0°C at times.

Climate data for Con Cuông
Month	Jan	Feb	Mar	Apr	May	Jun	Jul	Aug	Sep	Oct	Nov	Dec	Year
Record high °C (°F)	36.3 (97.3)	37.8 (100.0)	40.4 (104.7)	43.2 (109.8)	42.5 (108.5)	43.3 (109.9)	41.4 (106.5)	40.0 (104.0)	38.7 (101.7)	36.9 (98.4)	37.0 (98.6)	34.2 (93.6)	43.3 (109.9)
Mean daily maximum °C (°F)	21.6 (70.9)	22.6 (72.7)	25.8 (78.4)	30.3 (86.5)	33.7 (92.7)	34.6 (94.3)	34.7 (94.5)	33.4 (92.1)	31.4 (88.5)	28.8 (83.8)	26.0 (78.8)	22.9 (73.2)	28.8 (83.8)
Daily mean °C (°F)	17.6 (63.7)	18.7 (65.7)	21.3 (70.3)	25.0 (77.0)	27.7 (81.9)	28.9 (84.0)	28.8 (83.8)	28.0 (82.4)	26.6 (79.9)	24.4 (75.9)	21.5 (70.7)	18.4 (65.1)	23.9 (75.0)
Mean daily minimum °C (°F)	15.1 (59.2)	16.4 (61.5)	18.6 (65.5)	21.8 (71.2)	24.0 (75.2)	25.2 (77.4)	25.1 (77.2)	24.8 (76.6)	23.8 (74.8)	21.8 (71.2)	18.7 (65.7)	15.7 (60.3)	20.9 (69.6)
Record low °C (°F)	2.0 (35.6)	6.7 (44.1)	5.7 (42.3)	12.6 (54.7)	16.8 (62.2)	19.5 (67.1)	21.3 (70.3)	20.4 (68.7)	16.9 (62.4)	12.4 (54.3)	7.6 (45.7)	2.4 (36.3)	2.0 (35.6)
Average precipitation mm (inches)	36.2 (1.43)	35.1 (1.38)	50.6 (1.99)	86.2 (3.39)	182.2 (7.17)	149.5 (5.89)	175.0 (6.89)	266.7 (10.50)	350.6 (13.80)	284.2 (11.19)	82.1 (3.23)	32.4 (1.28)	1,724.6 (67.90)
Average rainy days	12.4	12.1	13.1	12.7	14.1	11.8	12.2	15.9	15.9	14.5	10.9	8.9	154.5
Average relative humidity (%)	88.5	88.7	87.5	84.9	81.1	79.2	78.6	83.5	86.6	87.8	86.9	87.0	85.0
Mean monthly sunshine hours	82.0	68.0	91.9	137.3	189.7	173.9	185.2	159.4	152.1	132.7	112.2	100.4	1,580.2
Source: Vietnam Institute for Building Science and Technology

=== Population ===
As of 2019, Con Cuông had a total population of 77,830, comprising more than 25 ethnic groups including the Thai, Dan Lai, Kinh, Hoa, and Nung. The Thai people numbered 52,803 (70.2%), followed by the Kinh at 18,059 (24%) and the Dan Lai at 3,750 (5%).

=== Administrative Divisions ===
- Trà Lân Town (Vietnamese: Thị trấn Trà Lân)
- Môn Sơn Commune (Vietnamese: Xã Môn Sơn)
- Yên Khê Commune (Vietnamese: Xã Yên Khê)
- Lục Dạ Commune (Vietnamese: Xã Lục Dạ)
- Chi Khê Commune (Vietnamese: Xã Chi Khê)
- Châu Khê Commune (Vietnamese: Xã Châu Khê)
- Cam Lâm Commune (Vietnamese: Xã Cam Lâm)
- Lạng Khê Commune (Vietnamese: Xã Lạng Khê)
- Bình Chuẩn Commune (Vietnamese: Xã Bình Chuẩn)
- Đôn Phục Commune (Vietnamese: Xã Đôn Phục)
- Mậu Đức Commune (Vietnamese: Xã Mậu Đức)
- Thạch Ngàn Commune (Vietnamese: Xã Thạch Ngàn)
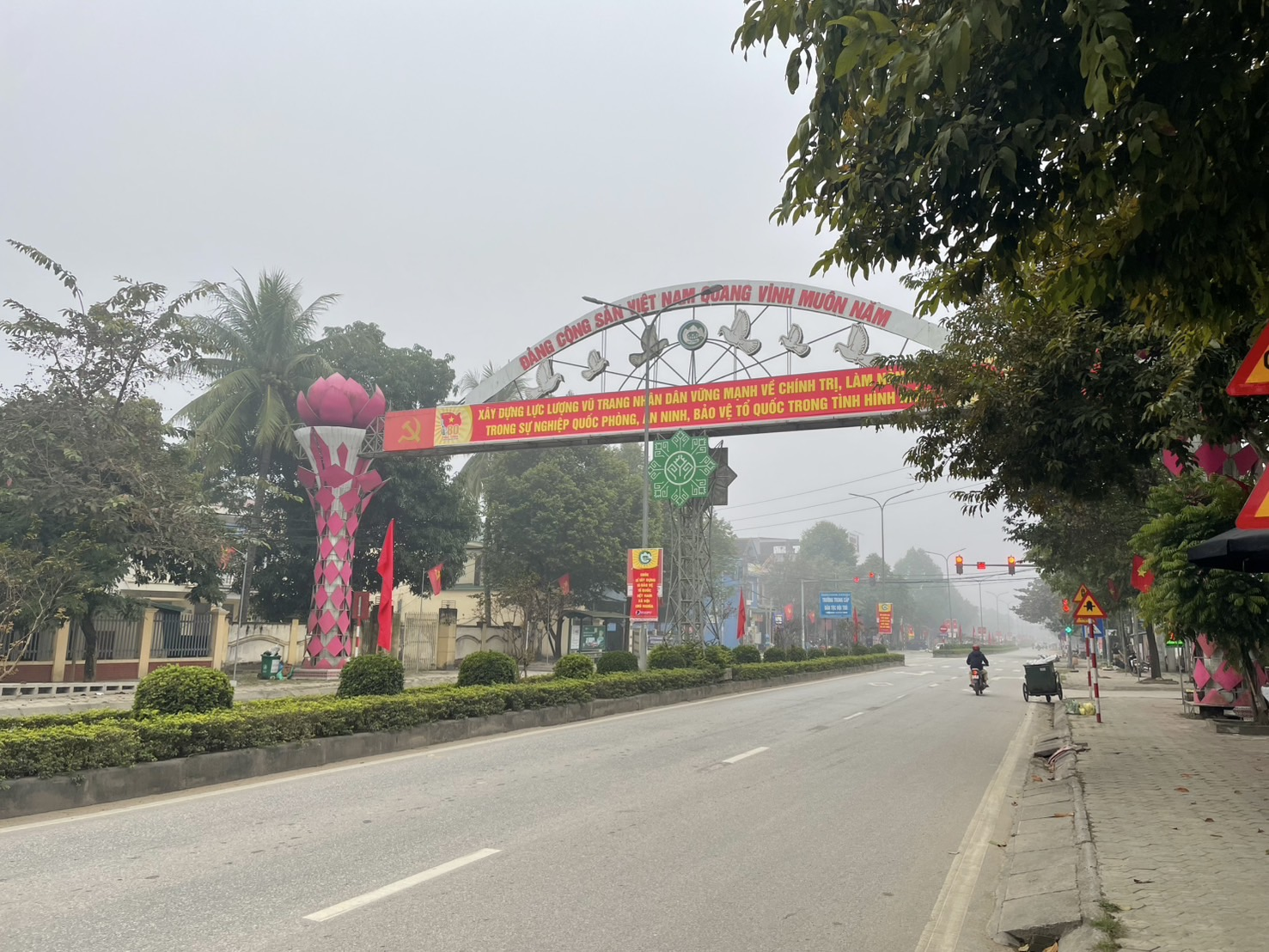
National Highway 7A in Trà Lân Town

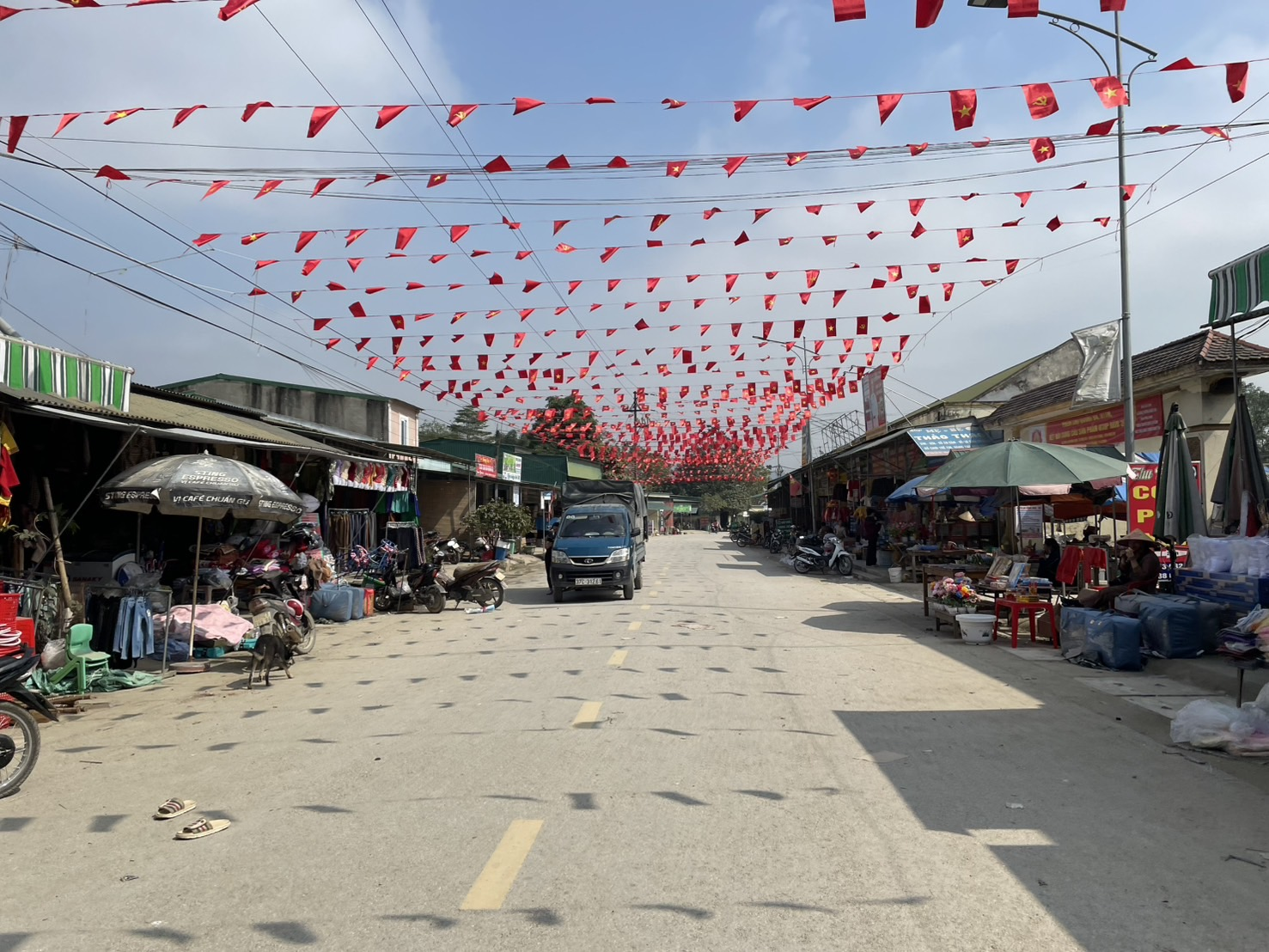
Môn Sơn Commune

== History ==
=== Prehistoric Period (to around the 10th century BC / approximately 1000 BC) ===
About 4 kilometers east of Trà Lân Town, there is a site called Tam Hoi Cave (Vietnamese: Hang Tàm Hối), which exhibits characteristics of the Hoa Binh culture. Excavations were conducted here in 1967 and 1972, revealing stone tools, animal bones, mollusk shells, human skeletal remains, and grave goods. Radiocarbon dating indicates the site is approximately 10,000 years old.

=== Ancient/Early State Formation (around the 10th century BC – 179 BC) ===
Con Cuông District was once part of Au Lac, an ancient Vietnamese polity. A Dong Son culture bronze drum (Type II) was discovered in the district, reflecting the presence of this early civilization.

=== Vietnam under Chinese rule (179 BC – AD 939) ===
After Au Lac was annexed by Nanyue (Vietnamese: Nam Việt) in 179 BC, Nghệ An Province—including the area that is now Con Cuông—came under the jurisdiction of Jiuzhen Commandery.

=== Autonomous Era (939 – mid-19th century) ===
During the Ly dynasty and Tran dynasty, Nghệ An Province—including Con Cuông—was considered a remote border region, far from the capital. However, under the administration of Ly Nhat Quang (Vietnamese: Lý Nhật Quang), who was appointed to govern Nghệ An, Con Cuông saw developments in land reclamation, village formation, and improvements in its transportation network.

In the early 15th century, during the Fourth Period of Northern Domination under the Ming (1407–1427), Vietnam was renamed Giao Chỉ Commandery, and the surrounding regions (including Nghệ An Province) were renamed Tra Long (Vietnamese: Trà Long) and Tra Thanh (Vietnamese: Trà Thanh).

In present-day Bong Khe Commune of Con Cuông District, the Trà Lân Fortress (Vietnamese: Thành Trà Lân), governed by a local general named Cam Banh (Vietnamese: Cầm Bành) who collaborated with the Ming forces, was established. However, it was later besieged by the Lam Sơn Uprising led by Lê Lợi, forcing Cầm Bành to surrender. The Ming also built a base near Cửa Rọ Valley, but according to local lore, Lê Lợi learned of their movements and launched a surprise attack, resulting in victory for the rebels.

After Lê Lợi defeated the Ming and founded the Later Lê dynasty, the area became known as Trà Lân (Vietnamese: Thành Trà Lân).

=== French Colonial Period (1858–1945) ===
In the early 1930s, the French colonial administration cracked down harshly on the Nghệ-Tĩnh Soviets, causing revolutionary activities in Nghệ An to face severe challenges. In response, the Central Party Committee decided to expand revolutionary bases into the mountainous areas, sending Lê Xuân Đào and Nguyễn Hữu Bình to Con Cuông to organize local youth and support peasant uprisings against landowners.

In March 1931, these efforts met some success. By mid-April, the Môn Sơn Branch (Vietnamese: Chi bộ Môn Sơn) was formally established at the residence of Vi Văn Khang, who became its first secretary. This branch formed Red Peasant Associations (Vietnamese: Nông hội đỏ) and Red Self-Defense Units (Vietnamese: Tự vệ đỏ), fostering unity against the French colonial regime and feudal powers. Though suppression intensified in the 1930s and temporarily stalled the movement, underground activities continued to expand their influence into surrounding areas. During the August Revolution of 1945, many local people rose in response to the branch’s call, seizing food and materials from wealthy landowners and officials to distribute to the poor, thus providing substantial support for the revolution.

=== Modern Era (1945–present) ===
From December 1, 2024, the former Con Cuông Township, the entirety of Bong Khe Commune, and part of Chi Khe Commune merged to form the newly established Trà Lân Town (Vietnamese: Thị trấn Trà Lân). Following this administrative reorganization, the town spans about 33.80 km² and had a population of 13,704 as of 2024.

== Economy ==
Although agriculture and forestry—including rice, corn, cassava, and forestry—remain the primary industries, recent years have seen efforts to attract wood-processing and agricultural-processing facilities, alongside promoting manufacturing and tourism as part of a broader drive for local development.

=== Agriculture and Forestry ===
About 94.46% of Con Cuông’s land area is dedicated to farming and forestry. Main crops include rice, corn, and cassava, with tea, oranges, and sugarcane also produced. In recent years, medicinal herbs have been increasingly cultivated.

=== Manufacturing ===
Government-approved investments and corporate incentives aim to revitalize manufacturing. In early 2024, the People’s Committee of Nghệ An Province endorsed projects utilizing roughly 12,000 hectares of acacia forest resources for a wood-processing zone, as well as infrastructure development for a construction materials zone. By October 2024, a garment factory employed approximately 1,000 workers, contributing to job creation in the district.

=== Tourism ===
With its scenic spots such as Pu Mat National Park and Khe Kem Waterfall, alongside rich ethnic minority cultures, according to a 2024 report by Báo Nghệ An, Con Cuông has been welcoming between 300,000 and 400,000 domestic and international tourists annually since around 2012, following the promotion of ecotourism and community-based tourism.

Many ethnic groups, particularly the Thai, maintain traditional crafts such as weaving, bamboo and rattan handicrafts and local spirits made with leaf yeast (Vietnamese: rượu men lá). Taking advantage of these cultural assets, communes like Nưa Village in Yen Khe Commune, Khe Rạn Village in Trà Lân Town, Xieng Village in Môn Sơn Commune and Bãi Gạo village in Châu Khê Commune offer traditional Tai culinary experiences, homestay lodging in stilt houses, boat rides on the Giăng River, brocade weaving, and cultural exchange programs.

=== Traditional Industries ===
Brocade Weaving (Vietnamese
Thổ cẩm)
Primarily practiced by Thai women using handlooms to create vibrant geometric patterns, this traditional craft is used to make clothing, scarves, and decorative textiles.

Bamboo and Rattan Handicrafts
Thanks to Con Cuông’s abundant forest resources, local artisans produce bamboo baskets, rattan storage items, and various household or decorative pieces.

Traditional Spirits
Representative traditional liquors include Rượu cần and Men Lá wine (Vietnamese: Rượu men lá), both made from sticky rice and leaf yeast. These fermented drinks have been passed down for generations among the Thai ethnic group and other minority communities.

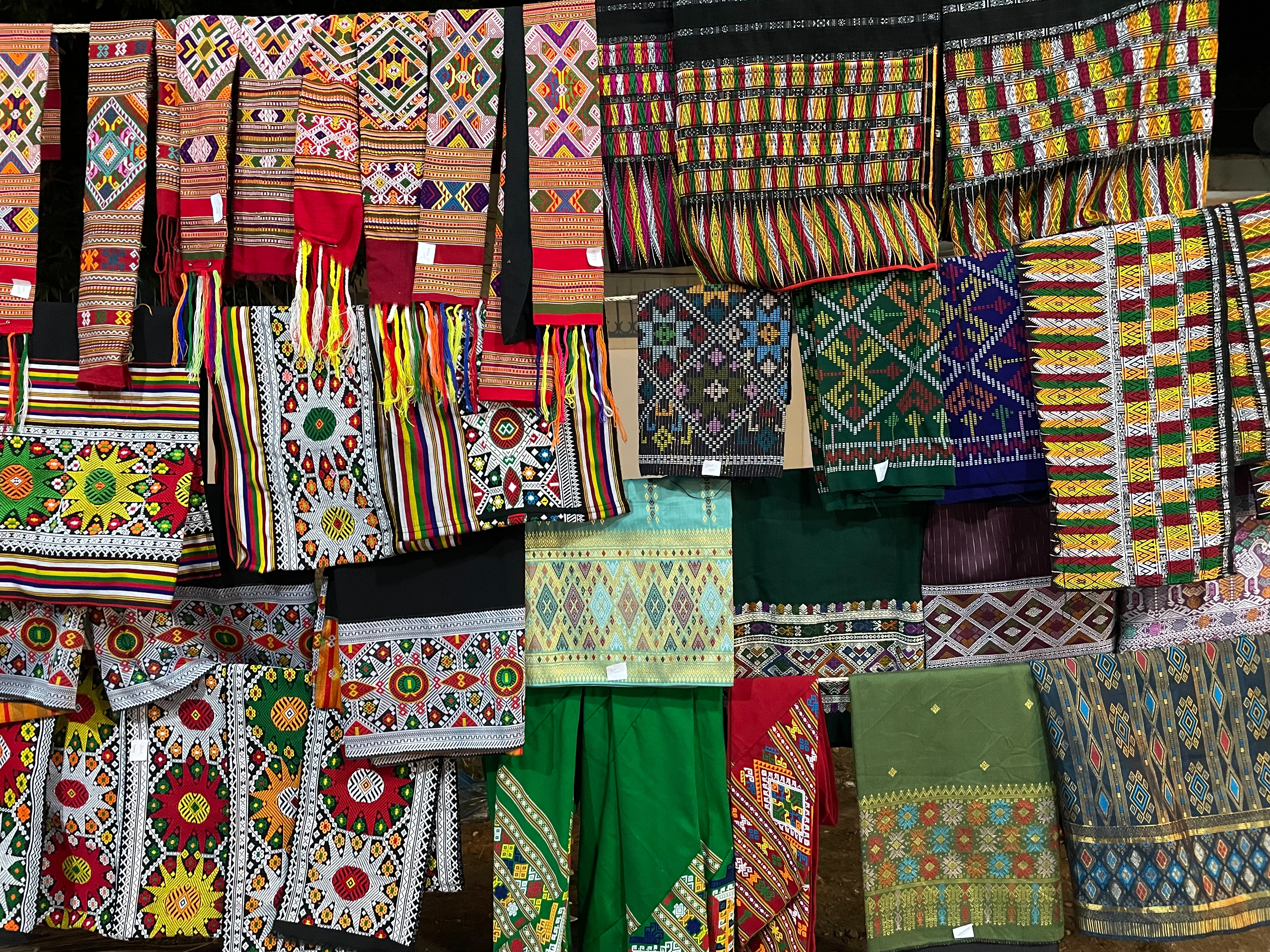
Brocade Weaving

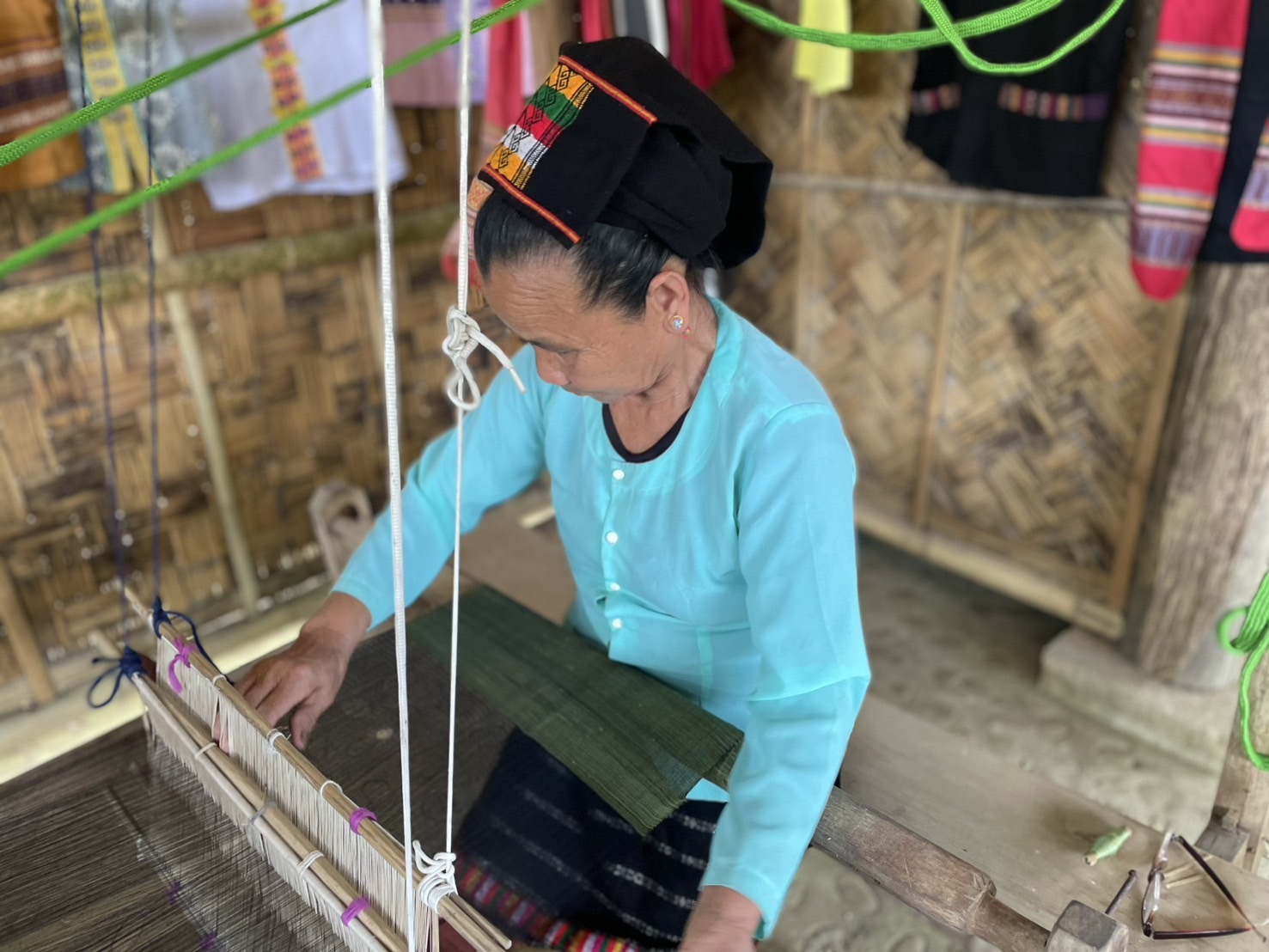
Loom weaving of the Thai ethnic group

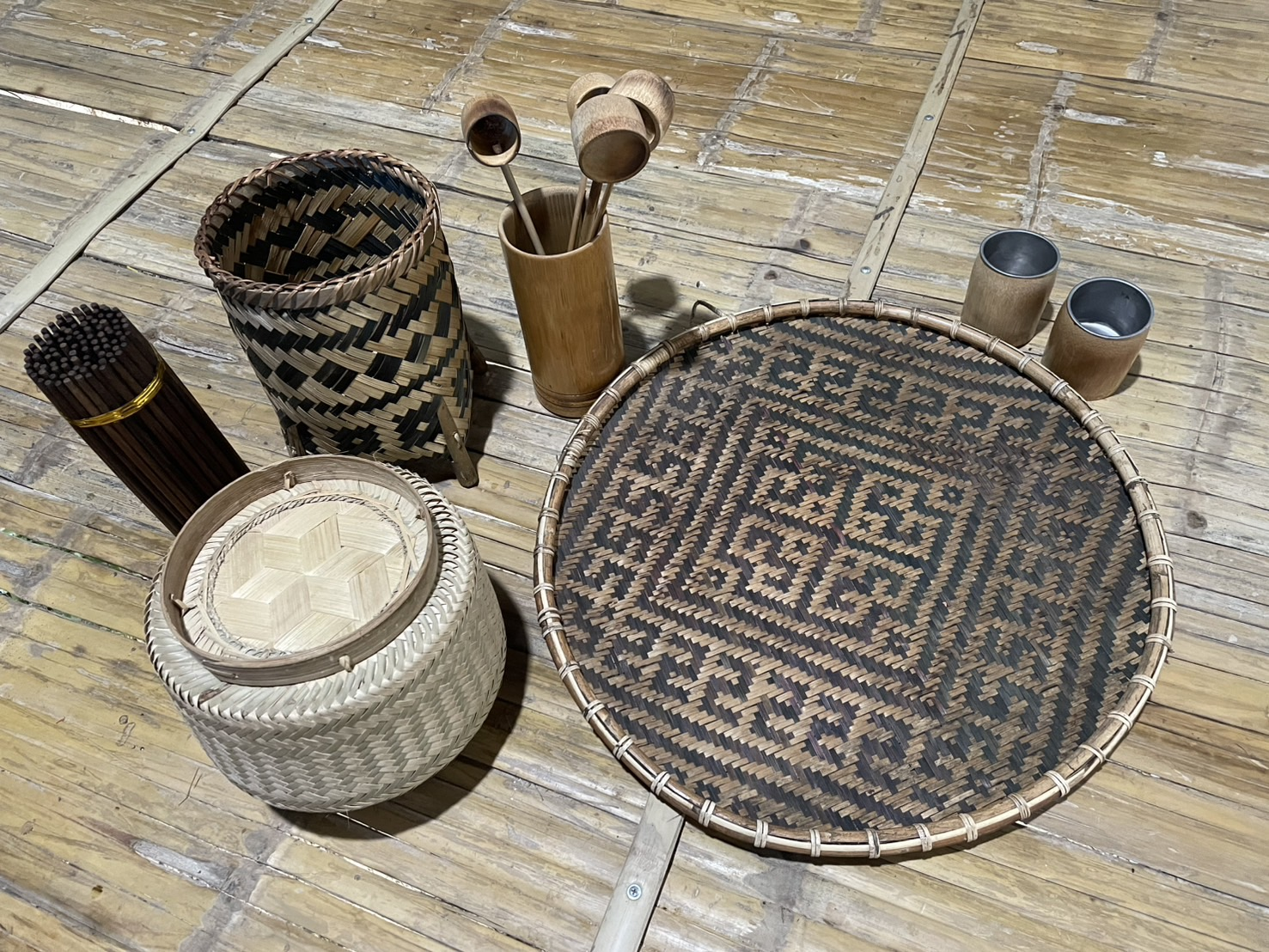
Bamboo Handicrafts

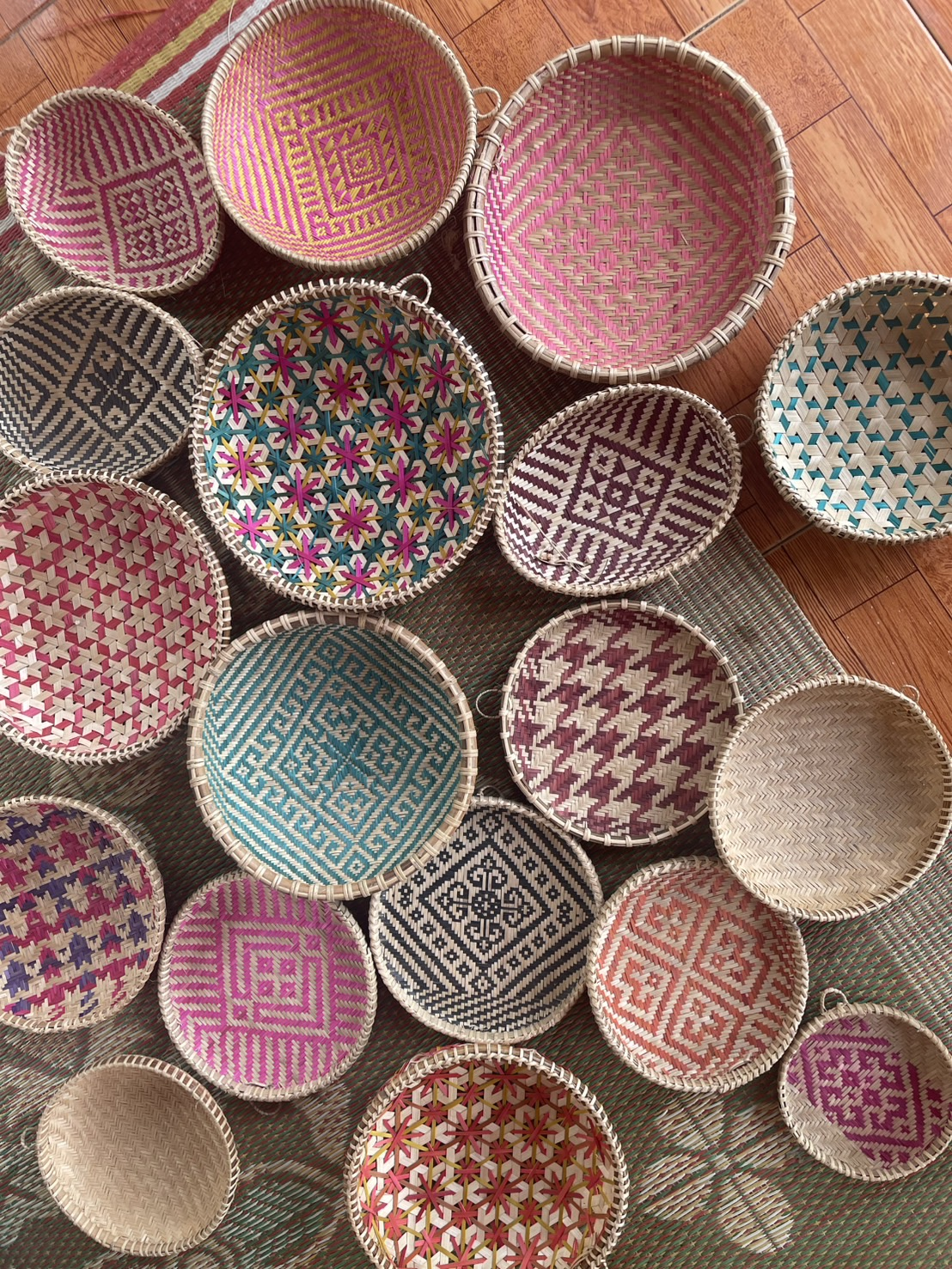
Bamboo basketry

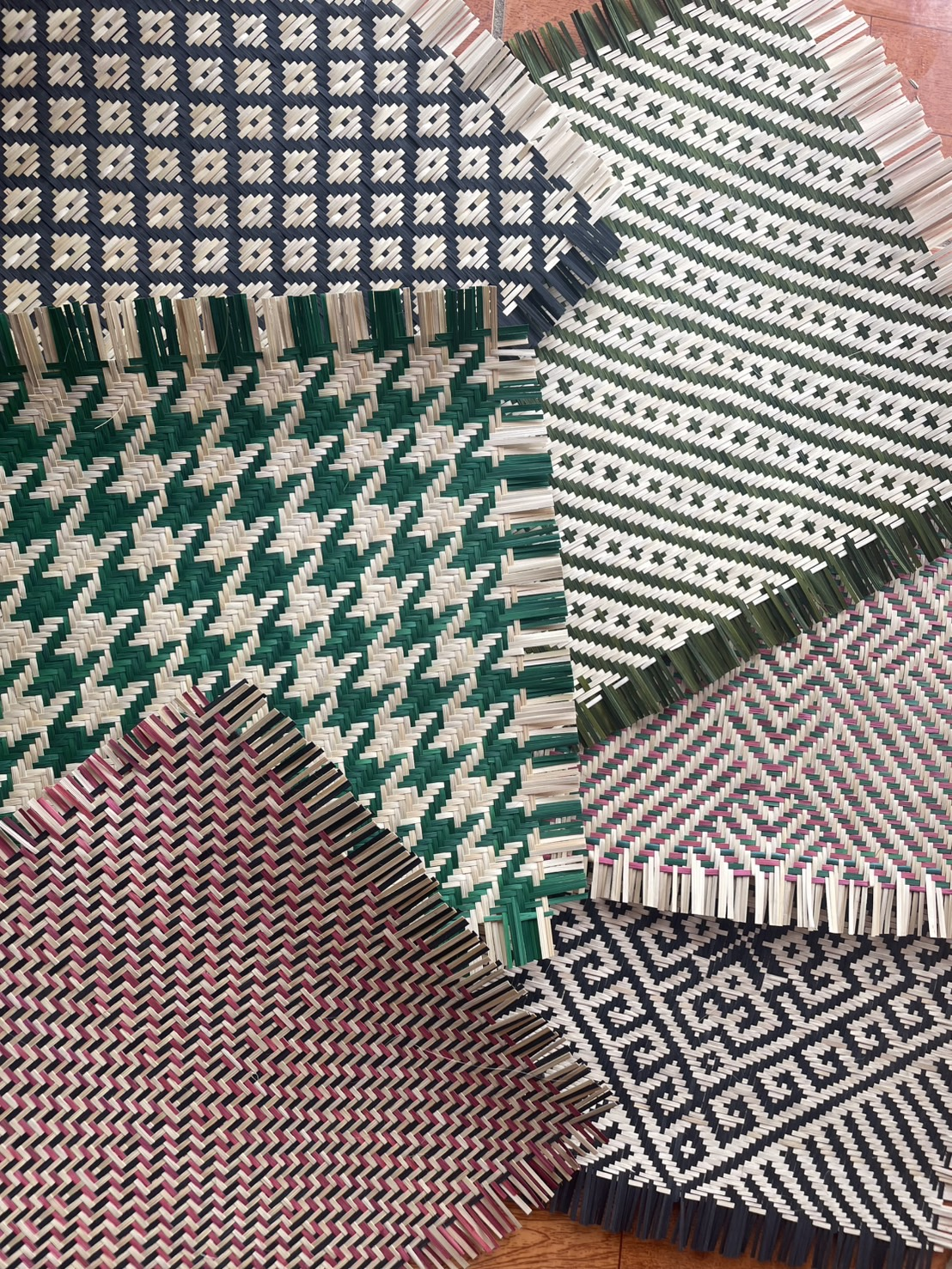
Bamboo weaving

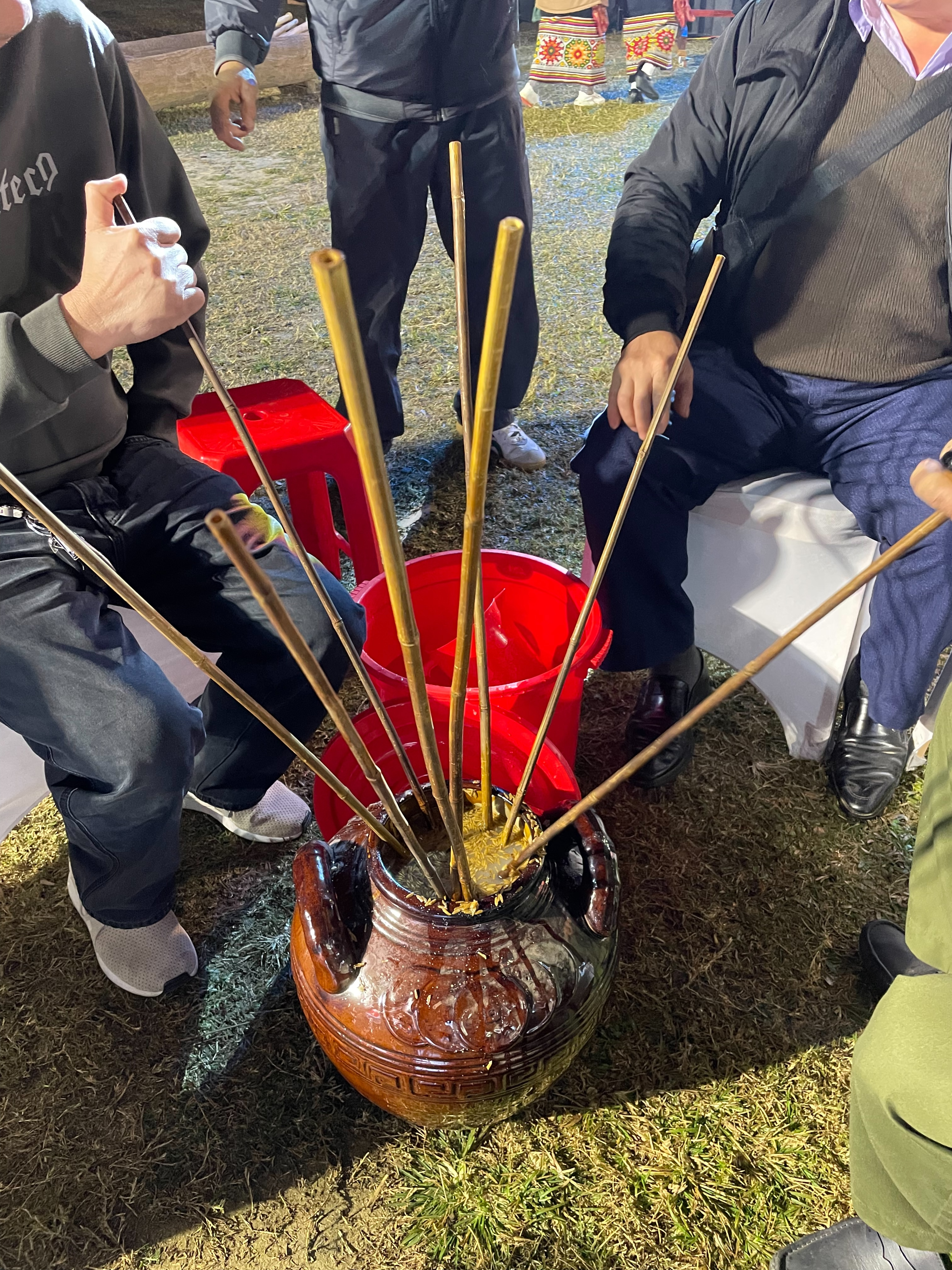
Rượu cần

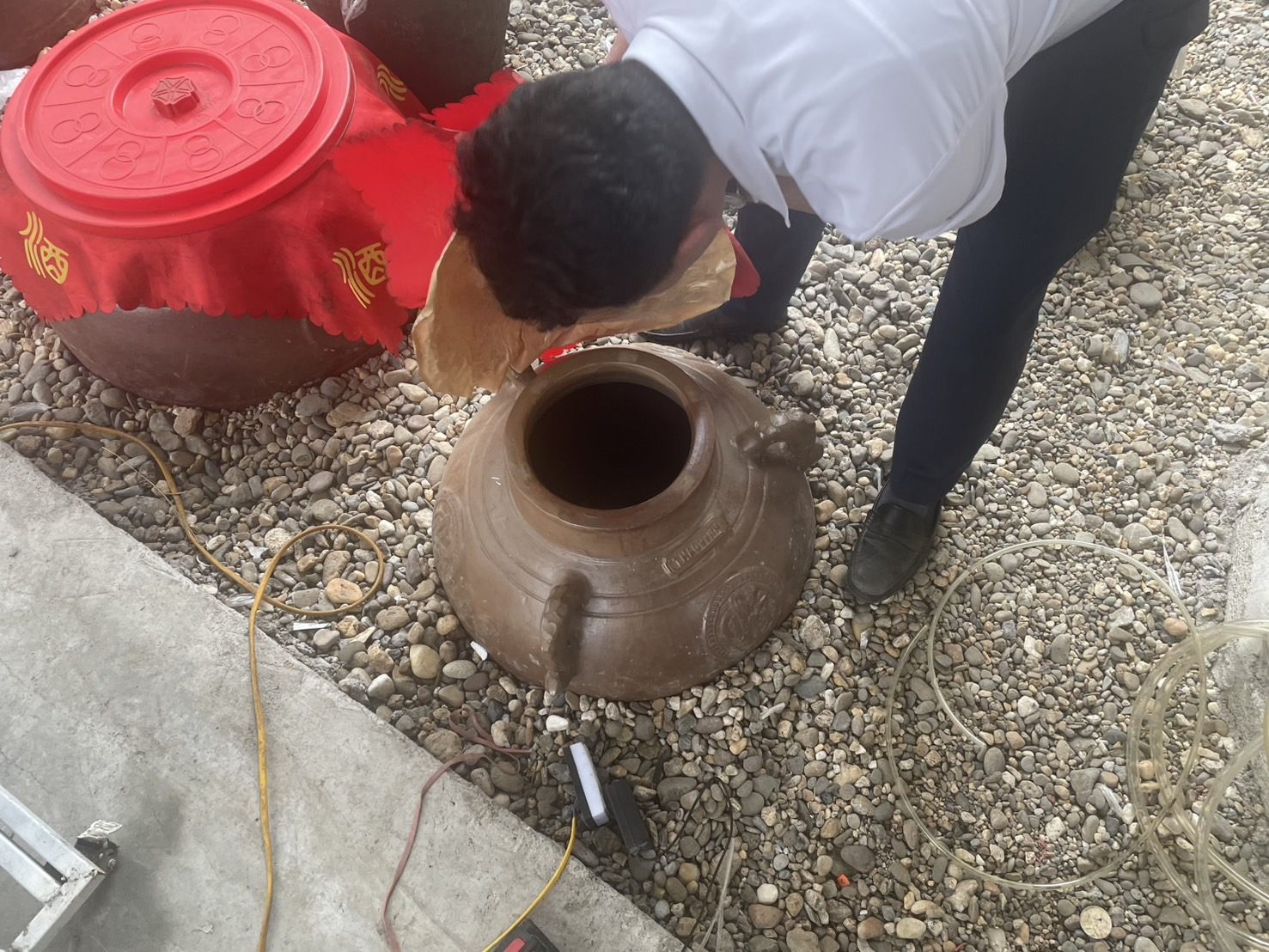
Burying rượu men lá in a jar underground

== Administration ==
- Chairman of the People’s Committee: Lô Văn Thao
- Chairman of the People’s Council: Lương Đình Việt
- Secretary of the District Party Committee: Nguyễn Hoài An

== Attractions ==
Khe Kem Waterfall (Vietnamese: Thác Khe Kèm)

A 150 m–high waterfall located in Pù Mát National Park. In the thai language it is called “Bo Bo” or “Boc Bo,” meaning “white silk ribbon”.

Pha Lai Dam (Vietnamese: Đập Phà Lài)

An irrigation facility in Pù Mát National Park, constructed between 2000 and 2002 to provide agricultural, domestic, and tourism water supplies. “Pha Lai” is a Thai term meaning “cliff with patterns”.

Moc Spring (Vietnamese: Suối Mọc)

A spring located in Yên Khê commune. Local legend says the Jade Emperor sent celestial maidens to bathe here before descending to the human world, which is why the site is also known as the “Fairy Spring”.

Khe Sat Temple (Vietnamese: Dền Khe Sặt)

A temple dedicated to Lý Nhật Quang. Residents visit on his death anniversary (the 16th and 17th days of the 12th lunar month) as well as on the 1st and 15th days of every lunar month for worship.

Ma Nhai merit record stele (Vietnamese: Ma Nhai kỷ công bi văn)

Carved directly into a rock face on Mount Thanh Nam in Con Cuông in the winter of 1335, this stele commemorates Trần Minh Tông’s victory against invaders from Ai Lao (present-day Laos). The inscription was drafted by scholar-official Nguyễn Trung Ngạn.

Trà Lân Fortress Ruins (Vietnamese: Dấu tích lịch sử thành Trà Lân)

Located in present-day Bong Khe Commune, the fortress was held by Cầm Bành, a Vietnamese general who collaborated with the Ming during the Fourth Period of Northern Domination (1407–1427). The fortress could accommodate several thousand troops, fortified by natural defenses of the Lam River and surrounding mountains, as well as deep trenches and bamboo fences. It was eventually besieged by Lê Lợi’s Lam Sơn Uprising, forcing Cầm Bành to surrender.

Cửa Rọ Valley (Vietnamese: Danh thắng Cửa Rọ)

Encircled by mountains, Cửa Rọ Valley served as a natural stronghold. During the Lam Sơn Uprising, Ming forces reportedly gathered here, but Lê Lợi, anticipating their movements, launched a surprise attack resulting in victory. During the Vietnam War, local residents also used the valley as a place of refuge from bombings.

Vi Văn Khang Residence (Vietnamese: Nhà cụ Vi Văn Khang)

Situated in Tai Hoa Village of Môn Sơn Commune, this stilt house served as a revolutionary base. In April 1931, a local Communist Party branch was established under Vi Văn Khang’s leadership. Meetings, storage of weapons, and printing of materials took place here. Every April, local residents hold a ceremony in honor of Vi Văn Khang’s contributions to the revolutionary cause.

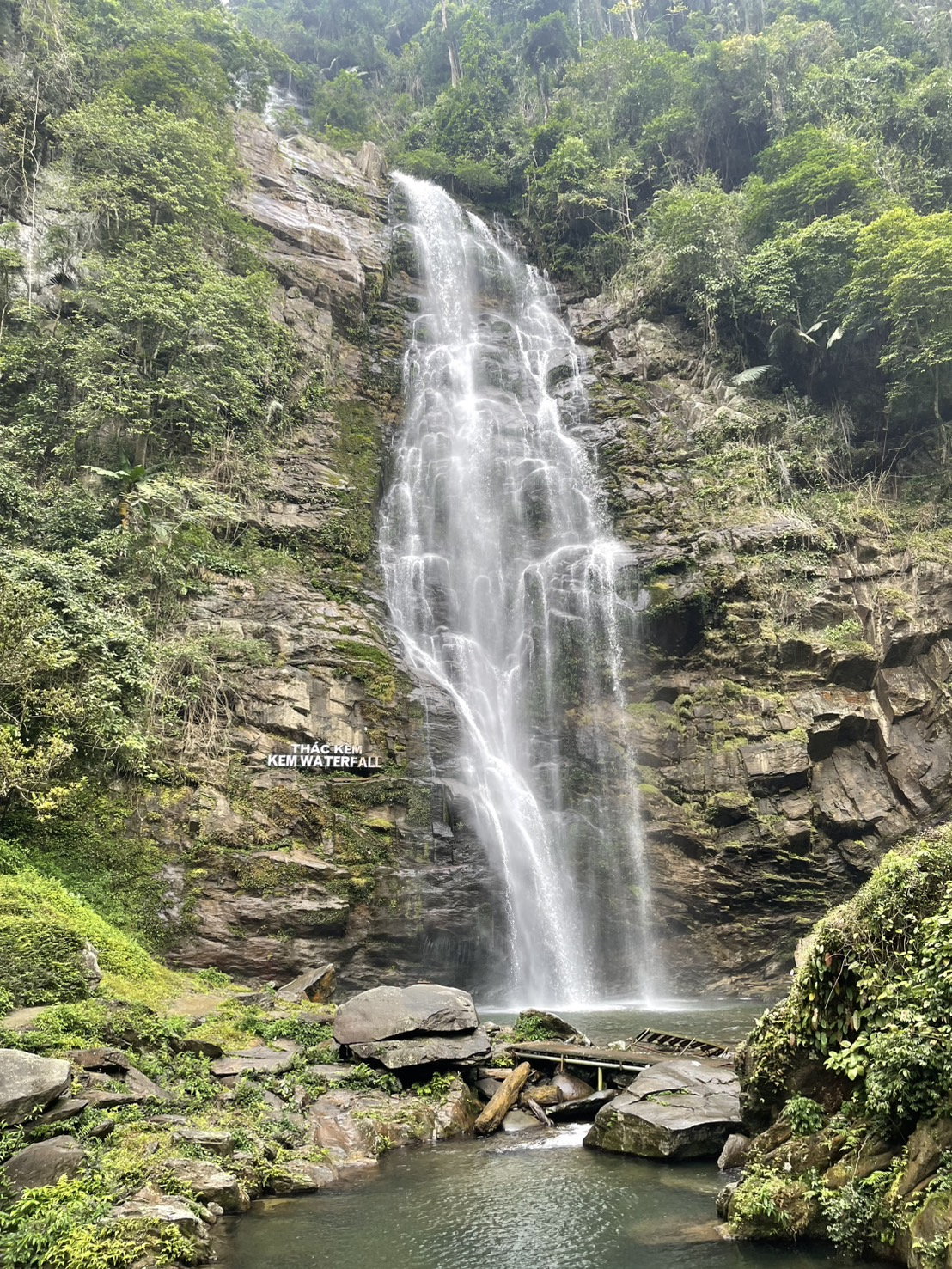
Khe Kem Waterfall

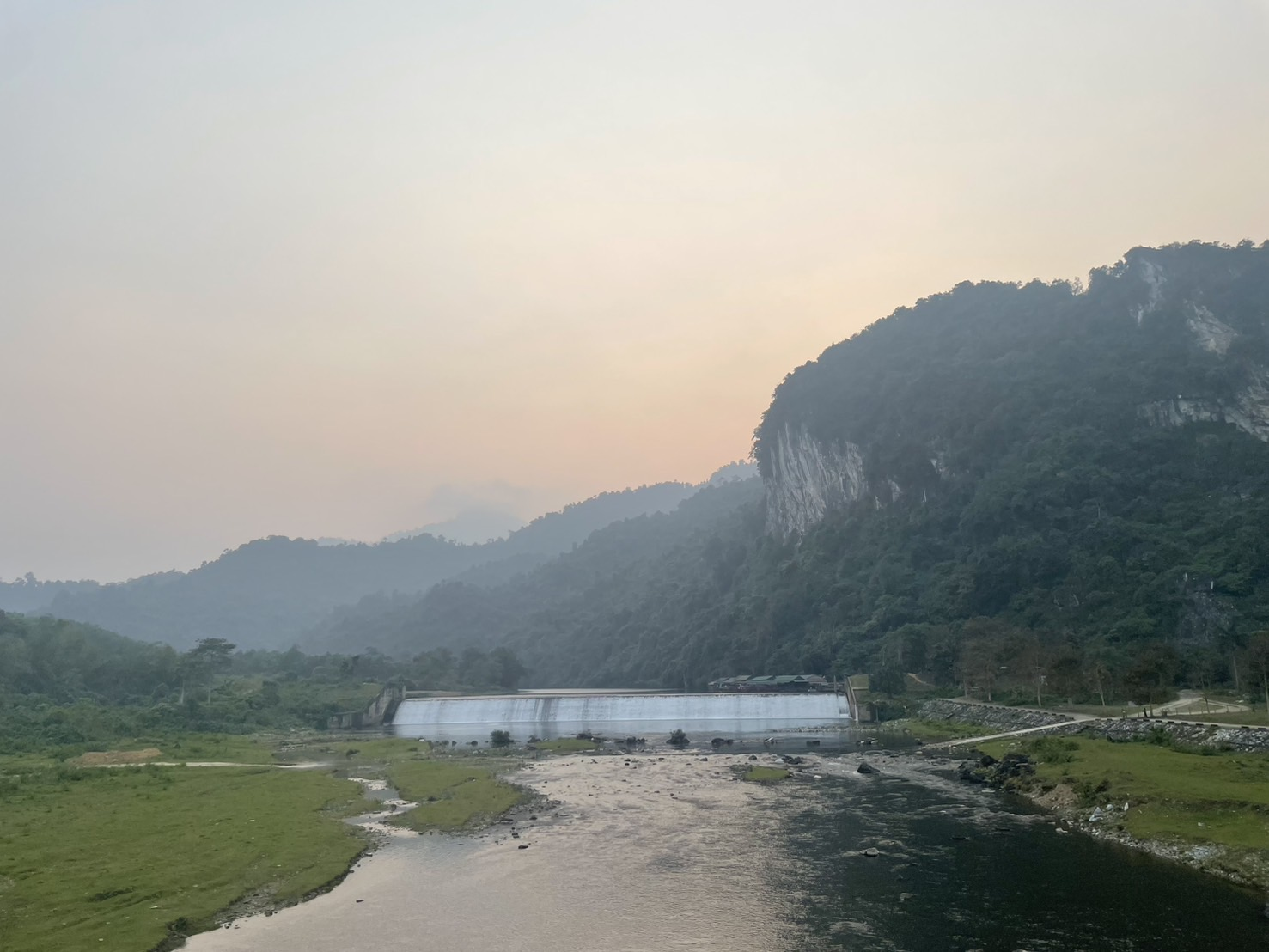
Pha Lai Dam

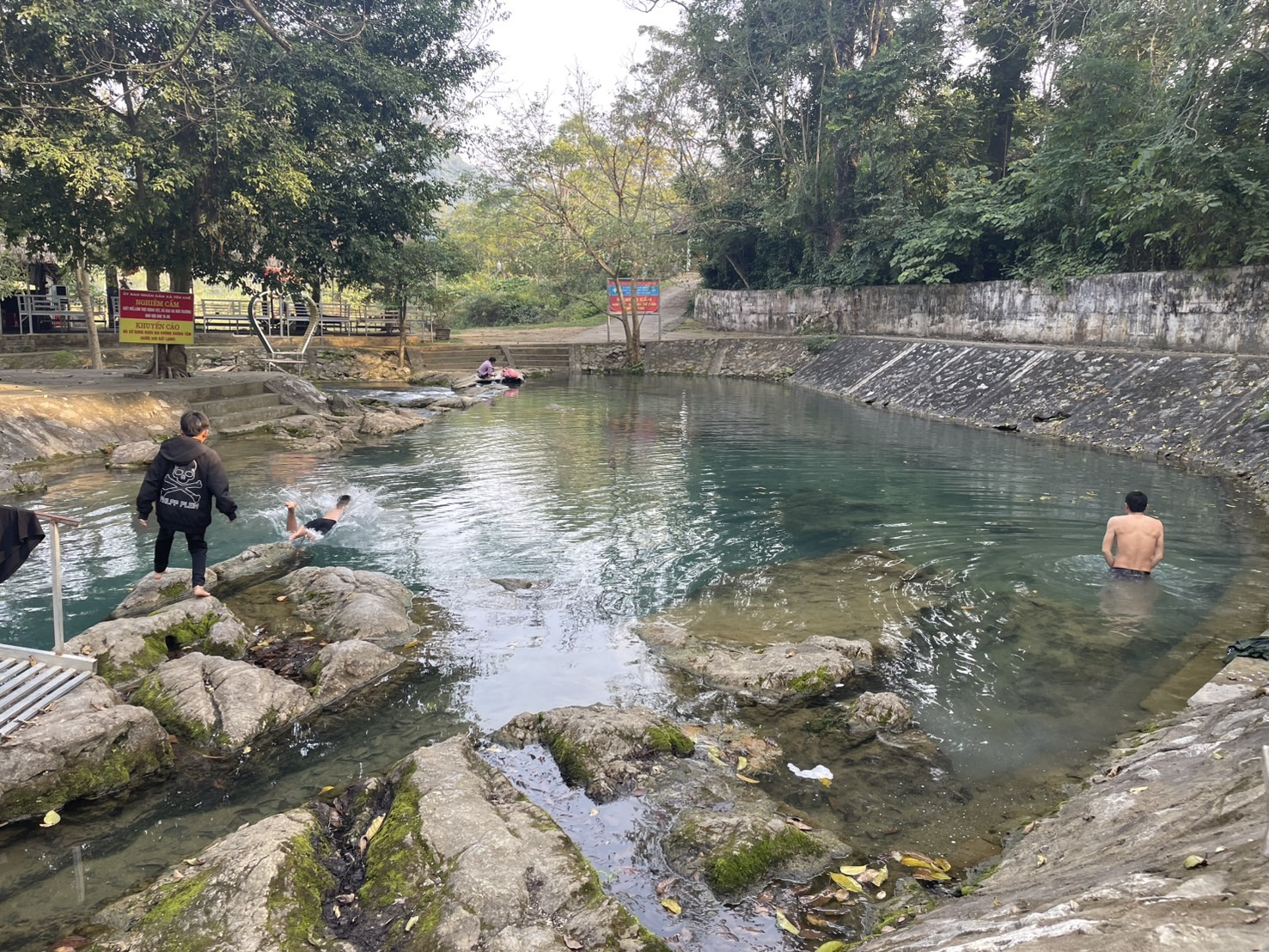
Moc Spring

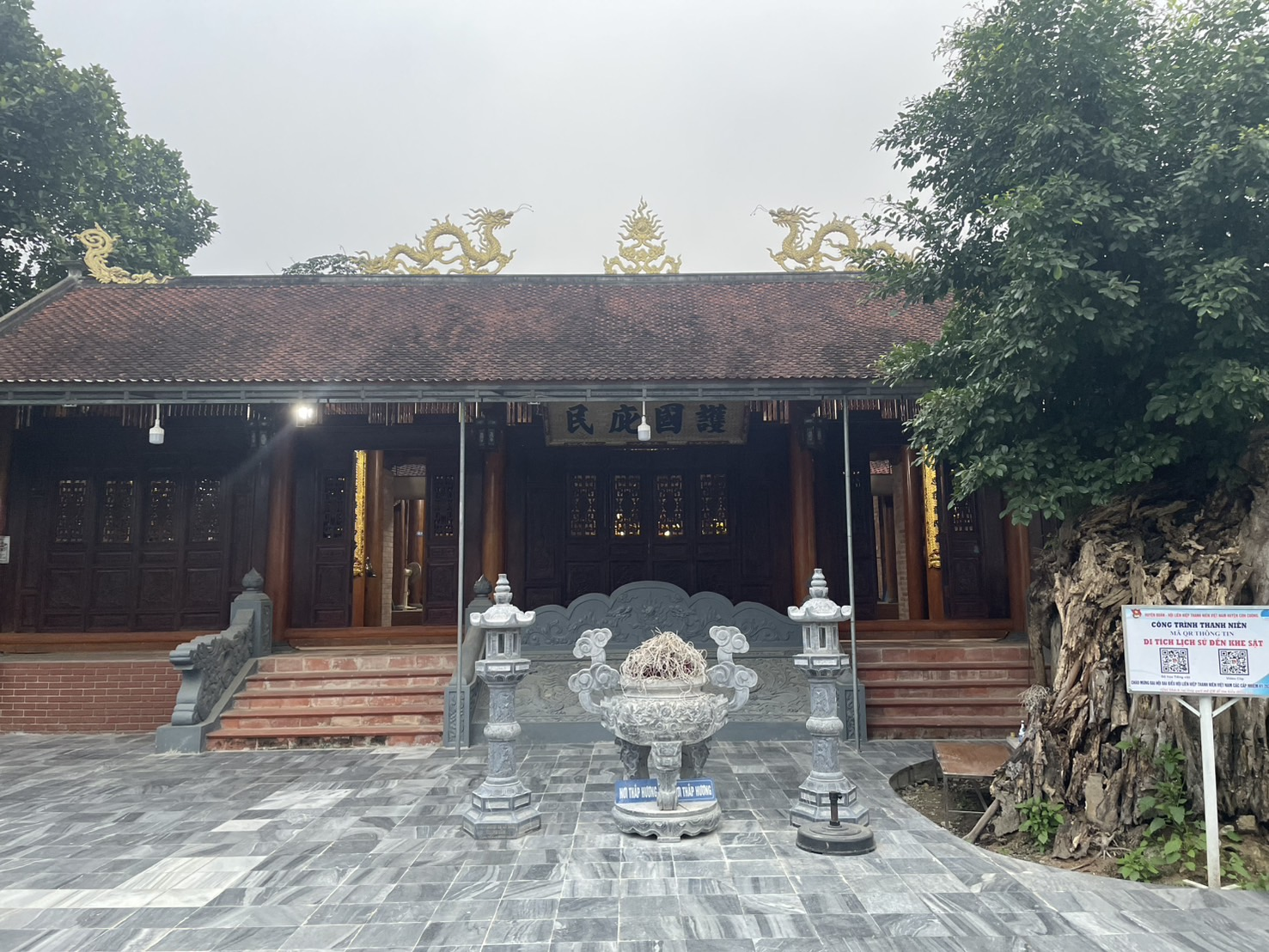
Khe Sat Temple

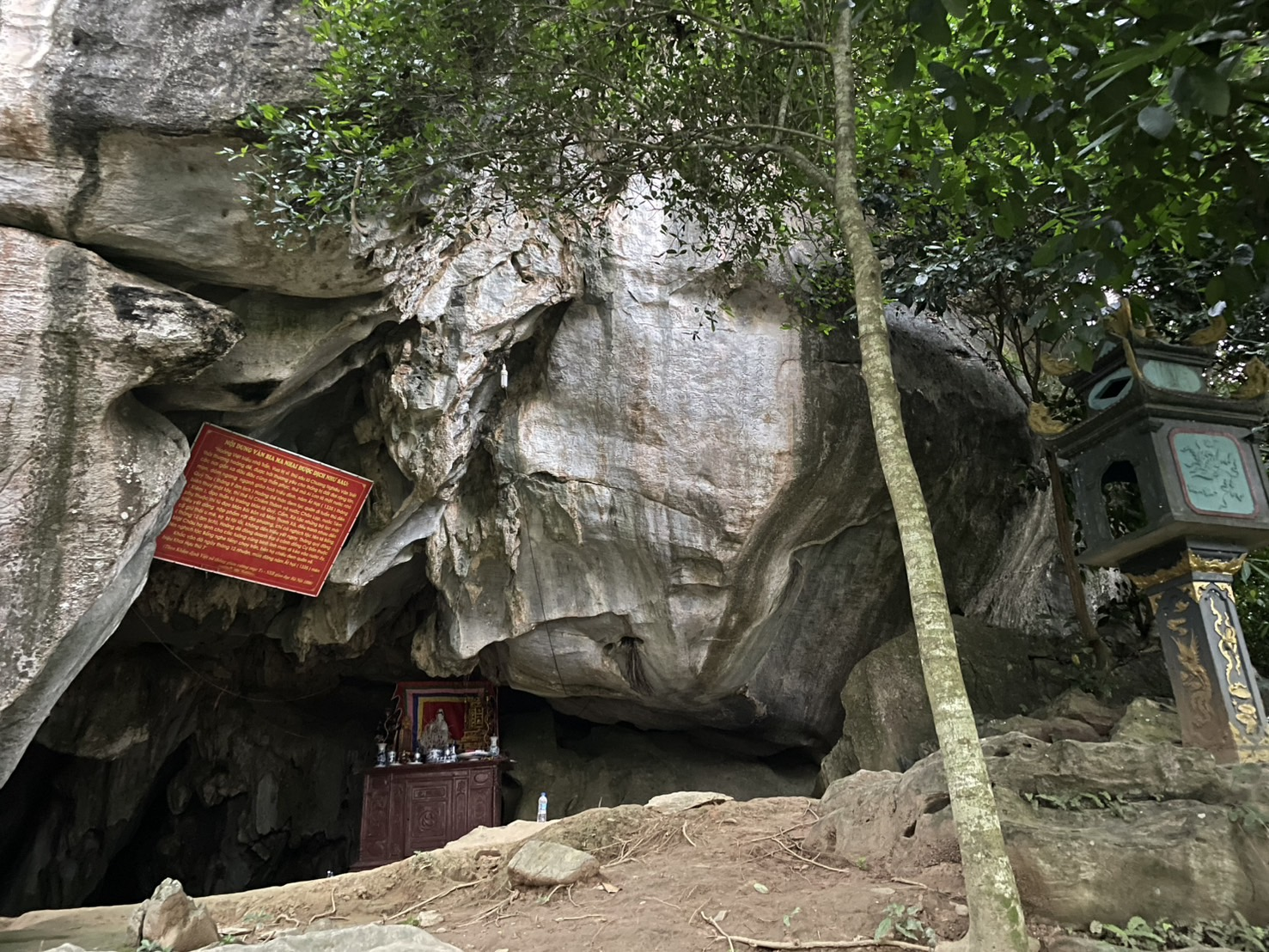
Ma Nhai merit record stele

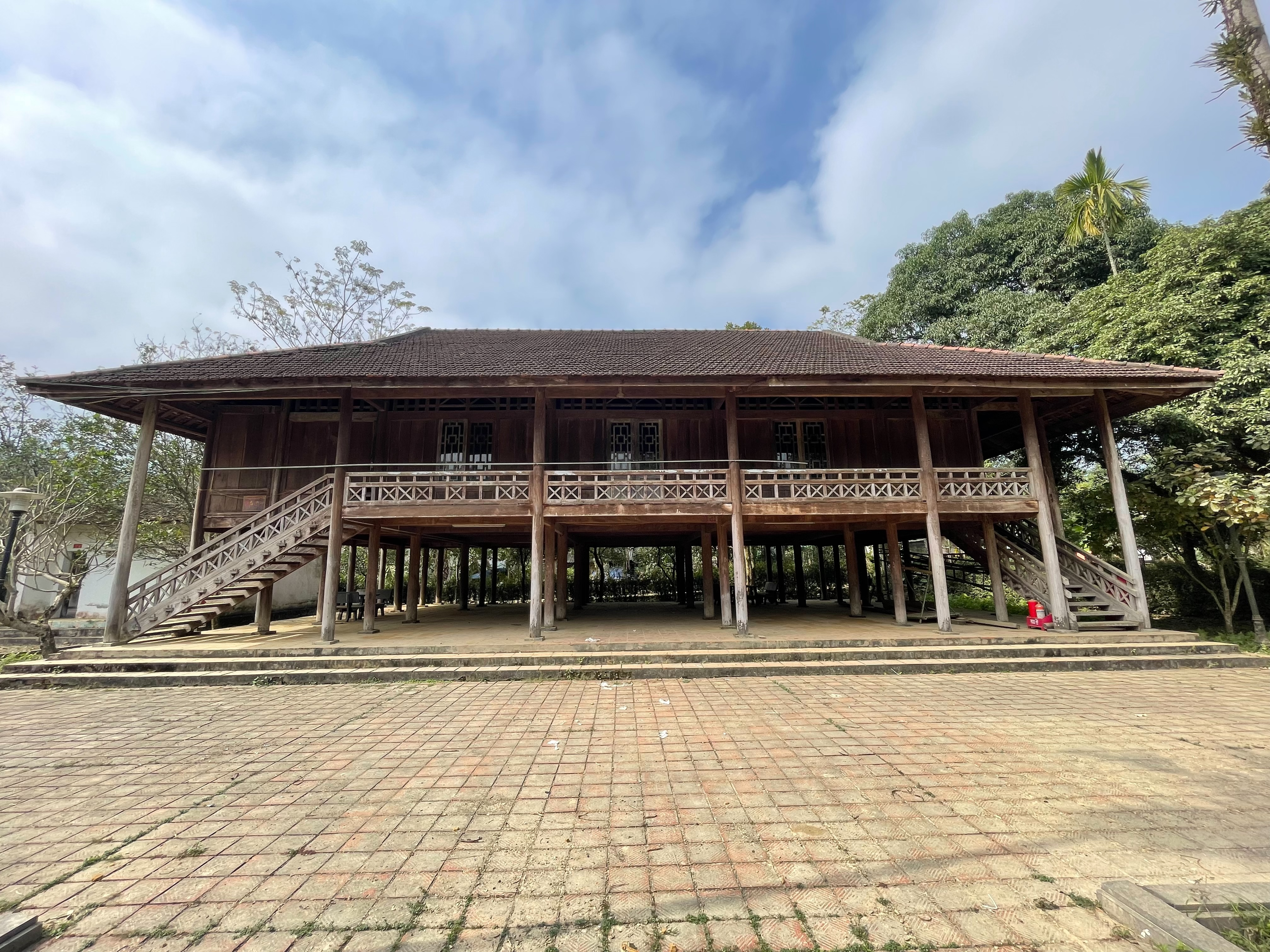
Vi Văn Khang Residence

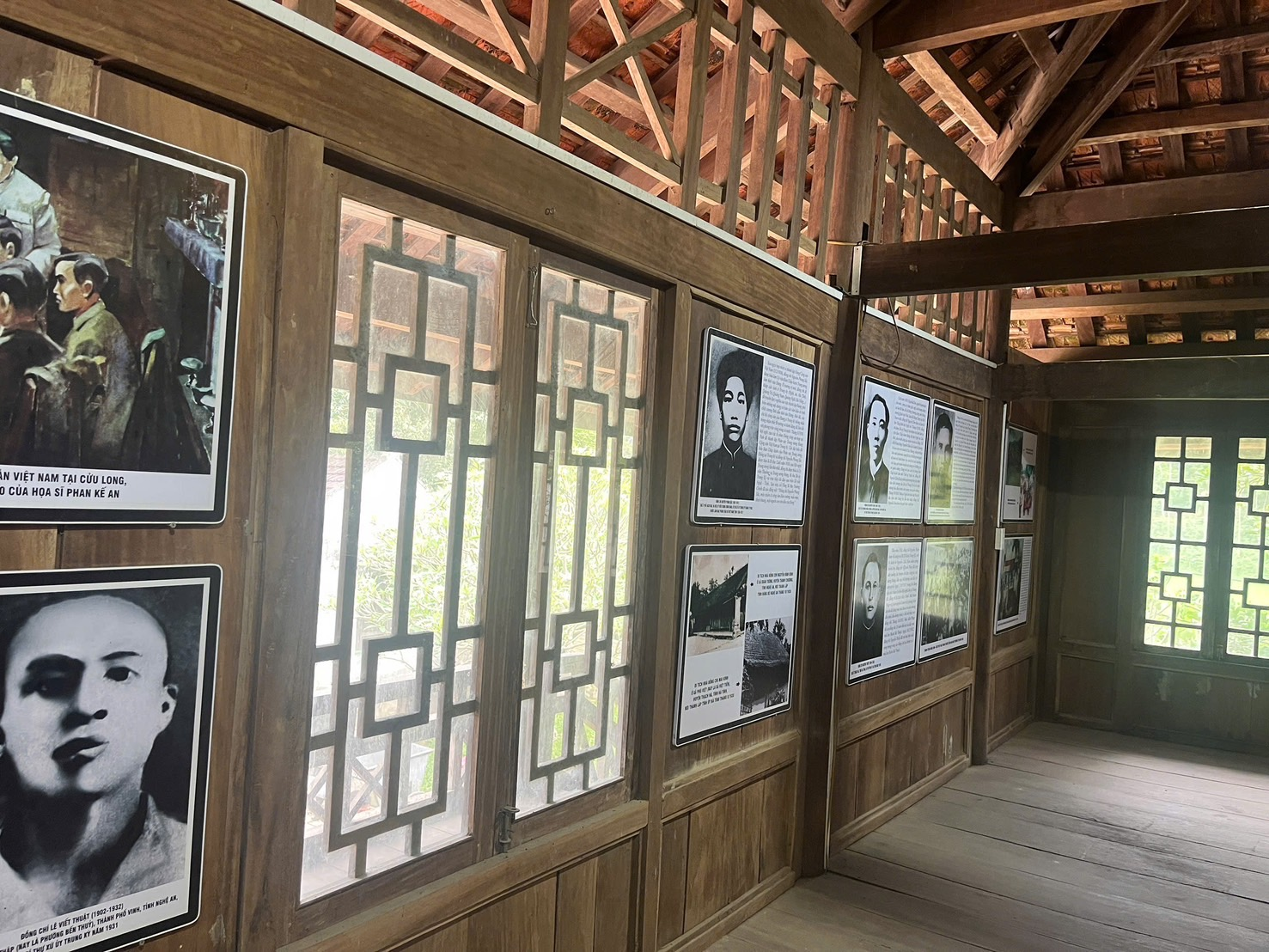
Inside the Vi Văn Khang Residence
