= Cẩm Lệ =

- Ward
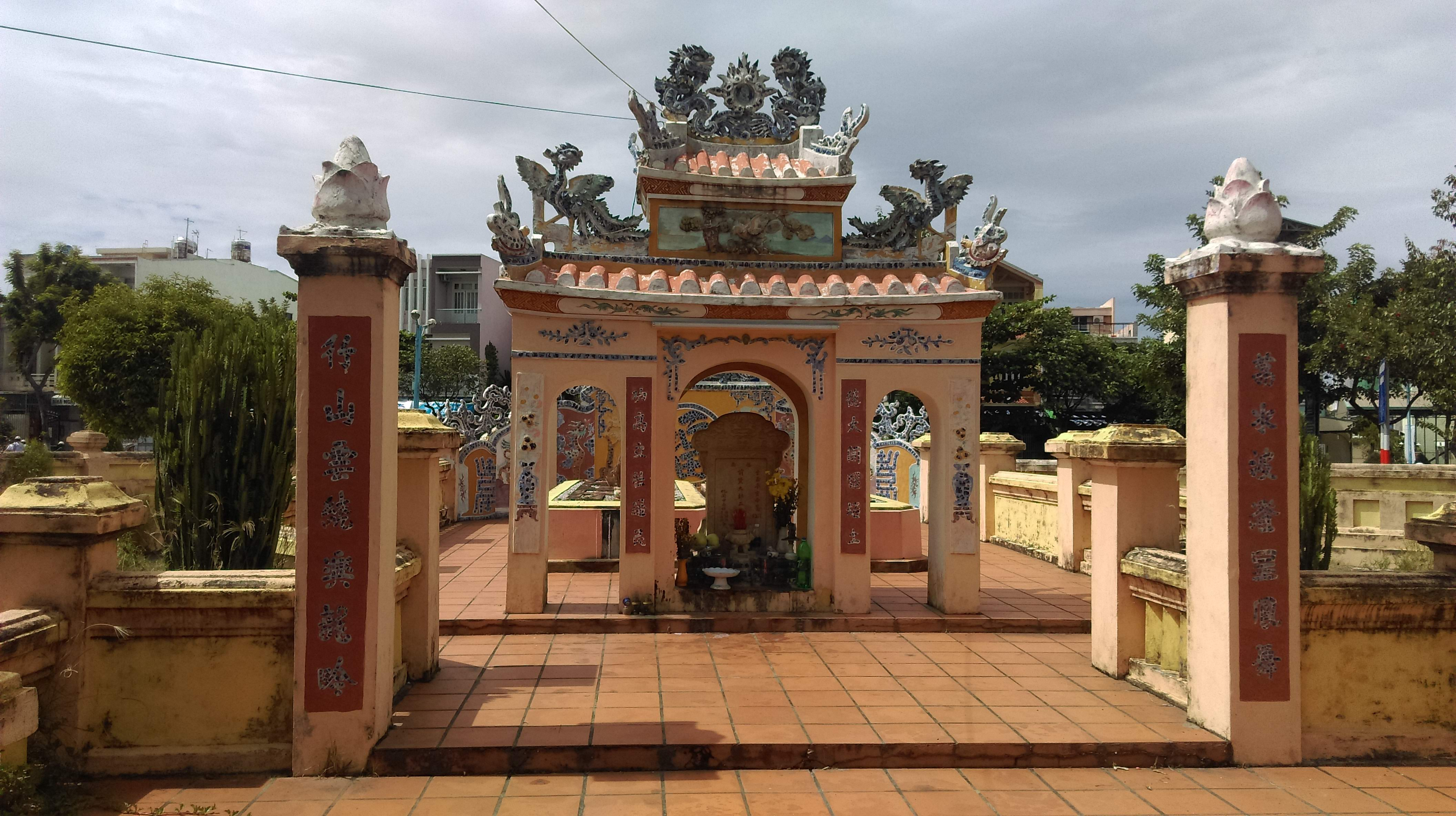
- Khuê Trung Shrine

- Location in Vietnam
- Coordinates: 16.01782668150642°N 108.20576078033312°E
- Country: Vietnam
- Region: South Central Coast and Central Highlands
- Municipality: Da Nang
- Administrative headquarters: 135 Ông Ích Đường Street

Area
  - Total: 14.05 km^{2} (5.42 sq mi)

Population (2025)
  - Total: 78,837
  - Density: 5,611/km^{2} (14,530/sq mi)
- Website: camle.danang.gov.vn

Cẩm Lệ is a ward in the municipality of Da Nang, Vietnam.

On 16 June 2025:

- District-level administrative units nationwide were dissolved.
- The entire area and population of Hòa Thọ Tây, Hòa Thọ Đông, and Khuê Trung wards, formerly part of Cẩm Lệ district, Da Nang, were merged to form a new ward named Cẩm Lệ.
