= 2025–26 Buriram United F.C. season =

Buriram United
2025–26 season
- Chairman: Newin Chidchob
- Head coach: Osmar Loss (until 7 October 2025); Mark Jackson (from 15 October 2025)
- Stadium: Chang Arena
- Thai League 1: 1st
- FA Cup: Winner
- League Cup: Semi-finals
- AFC Champions League Elite: Quarter-finals
- ASEAN Club Championship: Winner
- Top goalscorer: League: Guilherme Bissoli (14); All: Guilherme Bissoli (21)
Home colours	Away colours

The 2025–26 season is Buriram United's 14th season in the Thai League. (16th if including P.E.A.'s two seasons) The club will participate in the Thai League, Thai FA Cup, Thai League Cup, AFC Champions League Elite, and ASEAN Club Championship.

Buriram United, 2024–25 Thai League 1 champion, is supposed to kick off the season by competing in the Thailand Champions Cup against True Bangkok United.

On 25 June 2024, Thai League announced the program for the upcoming 2024–25 Thai League 1 season. The season commenced on 9 August 2024, and will conclude on 27 April 2025.

== Squad ==
As of 27 May 2025

Squad No.	Name	Nationality	Date of birth (age)	Previous club
Goalkeepers
13	Neil Etheridge	(Philippines) (England)	7 February 1990 (age 36)	(England) Birmingham City
29	Korraphat Nareechan	(Thailand)	7 October 1997 (age 29)	(Thailand) Lamphun Warriors
34	Chatchai Budprom	(Thailand)	4 February 1987 (age 39)	(Thailand) PT Prachuap
35	Kittipong Boonmak	(Thailand)	22 March 2005 (age 21)	Youth team
45	Prapot Chongcharoen	(Thailand)	4 January 2004 (age 22)	Youth team
Defenders
3	Pansa Hemviboon	(Thailand)	8 July 1990 (age 36)	(Thailand) Khon Kaen United
6	Curtis Good (Note: Curtis Good registered for ACL Elite and Shopee Cup only)	(Australia)	23 March 1993 (age 33)	(Australia) Melbourne City
14	Sandy Walsh	(Indonesia) (Belgium) (Republic of Ireland) (Netherlands) (England) (Switzerland)	14 March 1995 (age 31)	(Japan) Yokohama F. Marinos
15	Narubadin Weerawatnodom (captain)	(Thailand)	12 July 1994 (age 32)	(Thailand) BEC Tero Sasana F.C.
16	Kenny Dougall	(Thailand) (Australia)	7 May 1993 (age 33)	(England) Blackpool
22	Ko Myeong-seok	(South Korea)	27 September 1995 (age 31)	(South Korea) Daegu
30	Filip Stojković (Note: Filip Stojković registered for ACL Elite and Shopee Cup only after de-registered for Thai League before transfer window closed)	(Montenegro)	22 January 1993 (age 33)	(Austria) LASK
40	Eduardo Mancha	(Brazil)	24 November 1995 (age 30)	(Japan) Ventforet Kofu
63	Jhetsaphat Khuantanom	(Thailand)	28 January 2005 (age 21)	(Thailand) Kanchanaburi
68	Bordin Srakaew	(Thailand)	10 January 2001 (age 25)	Youth team
75	Shinnaphat Leeaoh	(Thailand)	2 February 1997 (age 29)	(Thailand) Ratchaburi
91	Phumin William Boers	(Thailand) (Netherlands)	15 January 2003 (age 23)	(Thailand) Sisaket United (T2)
	Wanthayawut Nuchkasae (D)	(Thailand)	25 September 2005 (age 21)	(Thailand) Sisaket United (T2)
Midfielders
2	Sasalak Haiprakhon	(Thailand)	8 January 1996 (age 30)	(Thailand) Bangkok United
5	Theerathon Bunmathan	(Thailand)	6 February 1990 (age 36)	(Japan) Yokohama F. Marinos
8	Ratthanakorn Maikami	(Thailand)	7 January 1998 (age 28)	Youth team
10	Suphanat Mueanta	(Thailand)	2 August 2002 (age 24)	(Belgium) OH Leuven
19	Kingsley Schindler (Note: Kingsley Schindler registered for ACL Elite only as he is signed after transfer window closed.)	(Ghana) (Germany)	7 December 1993 (age 32)	(Turkey) Samsunspor
23	Goran Čaušić (Note: Causic initially registered for ACL Elite and Shopee Cup only but also registered for Thai League before window closed.)	(Serbia)	5 May 1992 (age 34)	(Russia) FC Arsenal Tula
27	Phitiwat Sukjitthammakul	(Thailand)	1 February 1995 (age 31)	(Thailand) BG Pathum United
33	Thanakrit Chotmuangpak	(Thailand)	1 September 2006 (age 20)	Youth team
44	Peter Žulj	(Austria) (Croatia)	9 June 1993 (age 33)	(China) Changchun Yatai
48	Wanthayawut Nutkrasae	(Thailand)	25 September 2005 (age 21)	(Thailand) Muang Loei United
55	Thanyakon Swangsuk	(Thailand)	29 May 2007 (age 19)	Youth team
74	Kiattisak Hansena	(Thailand)	20 April 2001 (age 25)	Youth team
75	Supradit Wongsaprom	(Thailand)	9 June 2001 (age 25)	Youth team
96	Natpakhan Promthongmee	(Thailand)	28 November 2005 (age 20)	Youth team
Forwards
7	Guilherme Bissoli	(Brazil)	9 January 1998 (age 28)	(Brazil) Ceará
9	Supachai Chaided	(Thailand)	1 December 1998 (age 27)	(Thailand) Super Power Samut Prakan
17	Ilhan Fandi	(Singapore) (South Africa)	8 November 2002 (age 24)	(Thailand) BG Pathum United
26	Emmanuel Toku (Note: Emmanuel Toku registered for ACL Elite and Shopee Cup only)	(Ghana)	10 July 2000 (age 26)	(Cyprus) AEL Limassol
28	Rubén Sánchez	(Spain)	25 November 1994 (age 31)	(Uzbekistan) FC AGMK
32	Robert Žulj	(Austria) (Croatia)	5 February 1992 (age 34)	(Austria) LASK
49	Panuwit Jayakom	(Thailand)		Youth team
54	Nathakorn Rattanasuwan	(Thailand)	5 December 2007 (age 18)	Youth team
72	Sakdinon Bunlua	(Thailand)	12 January 2001 (age 25)	Youth team
77	Kasper Junker	(Denmark)	5 March 1994 (age 32)	(Japan) Nagoya Grampus
Players loaned out during season
4	Leon James	(Thailand) (England)	29 August 2001 (age 25)	(Thailand) Nongbua Pitchaya
18	Athit Berg	(Thailand) (Norway)	11 January 1998 (age 28)	(Thailand) Nakhon Pathom United
24	Elias Dolah	(Thailand) (Sweden)	24 April 1993 (age 33)	(Indonesia) Bali United
28	Maxx Creevey	(Thailand) (Australia)	28 April 1995 (age 31)	(Thailand) Nakhon Pathom United
35	Kittipong Bunmak (G)	(Thailand)	22 March 2005 (age 21)	Youth team
50	Singha Marasa (D)	(Thailand)	19 August 2006 (age 20)	Youth team
55	Juan Ibiza (Note: Juan Ibiza registered for ACL Elite and Shopee Cup only)	(Spain)	17 August 1995 (age 31)	(Poland) Widzew Łódź
70	Jirapong Pungviravong (F)	(Thailand)	20 September 2006 (age 20)	Youth team
88	Dutsadee Buranajutanon	(Thailand)	7 March 2006 (age 20)	Youth team
89	Pongsakron Hanrattana	(Thailand)	21 April 2003 (age 23)	Youth team
90	Panuphong Wongpila (F)	(Thailand)	15 February 2003 (age 23)	Youth team
92	Thanison Paibulkijcharoen	(Thailand)	19 February 2002 (age 24)	(Thailand) Nakhon Ratchasima
95	Seksan Ratree	(Thailand)	14 March 2003 (age 23)	Youth team
98	Anut Samran (G)	(Thailand)	16 March 2006 (age 20)	Youth team
	Phumeworapol Wannabutr (G)	(Thailand)	14 October 2004 (age 22)	Youth team
	Supanat Mahawai (D)	(Thailand)	12 April 2007 (age 19)	Youth team
	Pikanet Laohawiwat (D)	(Thailand)	4 March 2005 (age 21)	(Thailand) North Bangkok University
	Pakawat Taengoakson (D)	(Thailand)	28 February 2005 (age 21)	(Thailand) MH Nakhon Si City
	Paripan Wongsa (M)	(Thailand)	19 March 2005 (age 21)	Youth team
	Phumeworapol Wannabutr (M)	(Thailand)	14 October 2004 (age 22)	Youth team
	Rattapoom Pankejohn (M)	(Thailand)	26 May 2006 (age 20)	Youth team
	Natapakhan Promthongmee (M)	(Thailand)	28 November 2005 (age 20)	Youth team
	Sakdisek Kosol (M)	(Thailand)	23 July 2004 (age 22)	Youth team
	Piyawat Petra (F)	(Thailand)	15 March 2005 (age 21)	(Thailand) Kanchanaburi
	Winai Aimaot (F)	(Thailand)	28 January 2003 (age 23)	(Thailand) Rasisalai United
	Chanothai Kongmeng (F)	(Thailand)	7 March 2006 (age 20)	Youth team
Players left during season
	Lucas Crispim	(Brazil)	19 June 1994 (age 32)	(Brazil) Fortaleza
4	Robert Bauer	(Germany) (Kazakhstan)	9 April 1995 (age 31)	(Azerbaijan) Neftçi PFK
11	Pathompol Charoenrattanapirom	(Thailand)	21 April 1994 (age 32)	(Thailand) Port
20	Shayne Pattynama	(Indonesia) (Netherlands)	11 August 1998 (age 28)	(Belgium) Eupen
21	Đorđe Despotović (Note: Đorđe Despotović registered for ACL Elite only as he is signed after transfer window closed)	(Serbia) (Bosnia and Herzegovina)	4 March 1992 (age 34)	(Bosnia and Herzegovina) Borac Banja Luka
25	Nemanja Nikolić (Note: Registered for ACL Elite only)	(Serbia)	19 October 1992 (age 34)	(Serbia) FK Partizan
99	Fejsal Mulić	(Serbia)	3 October 1994 (age 32)	(Kazakhstan) FC Elimai
	Pontakron Hanrattana (M)	(Thailand)	21 April 2003 (age 23)	Youth team

== Transfer ==
=== In ===
Pre-season transfer

Date	Position	Player	Transferred from	Fee	Ref
First team
1 June 2025	DF	(Thailand) (Cyprus) Charalampos Charalampous	(Thailand) Uthai Thani	Loan Return	
1 June 2025	DF	(Thailand) (Netherlands) Phumin William Boers	(Thailand) Police Tero	Loan Return	
1 June 2025	DF	(Thailand) Suporn Peenagatapho	(Thailand) Ratchaburi	Loan Return	(Note: Suporn Peenagatapho returned to Ratchaburi permanently after contract end.)
1 June 2025	FW	(Thailand) Panuphong Wongpila	(Thailand) Sisaket United	Loan Return	
1 June 2025	FW	(Brazil) Chrigor	(Thailand) PT Prachuap	Loan Return	(Note: Chrigor returned & moved to Selangor FC after his contract end.)
1 June 2025	FW	(Thailand) (England) Siam Yapp	(Thailand) Nakhon Ratchasima	Loan Return	(Note: Siam Yaap returned & released after his contract end.)
1 June 2025	FW	(Thailand) Arthit Boodjinda	(Thailand) Rayong	Loan Return	(Note: Arthit Boodjinda returned & moved to Khon Kaen United after his contract end.)
7 July 2025	GK	(Thailand) Korraphat Nareechan	(Thailand) Lamphun Warriors	Free	
7 July 2025	DF	(Thailand) (Sweden) Elias Dolah	(Indonesia) Bali United	Free	
7 July 2025	DF	(Indonesia) (Netherlands) Shayne Pattynama	(Belgium) Eupen	Free	
7 July 2025	DF	(Thailand) Shinnaphat Leeaoh	(Thailand) BG Pathum United	Free	
7 July 2025	MF	(Thailand) Pathompol Charoenrattanapirom	(Thailand) Port	Free	
7 July 2025	FW	(Singapore) (South Africa) Ilhan Fandi	(Thailand) BG Pathum United	Season loan	
8 July 2025	DF	(Spain) Juan Ibiza	(Poland) Widzew Łódź	Free	
8 July 2025	DF	(Germany) (Kazakhstan) Robert Bauer	(Azerbaijan) Neftçi PFK	Free	
8 July 2025	DF	(Montenegro) Filip Stojković	(Austria) LASK	Free	
8 July 2025	FW	(Serbia) Fejsal Mulić	(Kazakhstan) FC Elimai	Free	
8 July 2025	FW	(Serbia) Nemanja Nikolić	(Serbia) FK Partizan	Free	
8 July 2025	FW	(Austria) (Croatia) Robert Žulj	(Austria) LASK	Free	
15 August 2025	DF	(Indonesia) (Belgium) Sandy Walsh	(Japan) Yokohama F. Marinos	Free	
Academy
1 June 2025	GK	(Thailand) Nopphon Lakhonphon	(Thailand) Nakhon Si United	Loan Return	
1 June 2025	DF	(Thailand) Kritsana Daokrajai	(Thailand) Nakhon Si United	Loan Return	
1 June 2025	DF	(Thailand) Thanison Paibulkijcharoen	(Thailand) Nakhon Ratchasima	Loan Return	
1 June 2025	MF	(Thailand) Ratthaphum Pankhejorn	(Thailand) Police Tero	Loan Return	
1 June 2025	MF	(Thailand) Paripan Wongsa	(Thailand) Sisaket United	Loan Return	
1 June 2025	MF	(Thailand) Wanthayawut Nutkrasae	(Thailand) Muang Loei United	Loan Return	
1 June 2025	MF	(Thailand) Chutipol Thongthae	(Thailand) PT Prachuap	Loan Return	
1 June 2025	FW	(Thailand) Panuphong Wongpila	(Thailand) Sisaket United	Loan Return	
1 June 2025	FW	(Thailand) Piyawat Petra	(Thailand) Kanchanaburi	Loan Return	

Mid-season transfer

Date	Position	Player	Transferred from	Fee	Ref
First team
10 October 2025	MF	(Ghana) (Germany) Kingsley Schindler	(Turkey) Samsunspor	Free	
10 October 2025	FW	(Serbia) (Bosnia and Herzegovina) Đorđe Despotović	(Bosnia and Herzegovina) Borac Banja Luka	Free	
16 December 2025	DF	(Brazil) Eduardo Mancha	(Japan) Ventforet Kofu	Free	
16 December 2025	FW	(Spain) Rubén Sánchez	(Uzbekistan) AGMK	Free	
16 December 2025	FW	(Ghana) Emmanuel Toku	(Belgium) OH Leuven	Free	
21 December 2025	MF	(Thailand) (England) Leon James	(Thailand) Uthai Thani	End of loan	
7 February 2026	FW	(Denmark) Kasper Junker	(Japan) Nagoya Grampus	Free	
6 May 2026	DF	(Thailand) (Netherlands) Phumin William Boers	(Thailand) Sisaket United (T2)	End of loan	
Academy
13 January 2026	MF	(Thailand) Pontakron Hanrattana	(Thailand) Nakhon Ratchasima	Season loan	
6 May 2026	DF	(Thailand) Wanthayawut Nuchkasae	(Thailand) Sisaket United (T2)	End of Loan	

Post-season transfer

Date	Position	Player	Transferred from	Fee	Ref
First team
2026	DF	(Thailand) Anusak Jaiphet	(Thailand) Nakhon Ratchasima	Free	
2026	MF	(Montenegro) Vukan Savićević	(Serbia) FK Vojvodina	Free	
2026	FW	(Thailand) Anan Yodsangwal	(Thailand) Lamphun Warriors	Free	
2026	FW	(Thailand) Iklas Sanron	(Thailand) PT Prachuap	Free	
2026	FW	(Nigeria) Ifeanyi Eze	(New Zealand) Wellington Phoenix	Free	
2026	FW	(Germany) Stefan Schimmer	(Germany) Heidenheim	Free	

=== Out ===
Preseason

Date	Position	Player	Transferred To	Fee	Ref
First team
1 June 2025	GK	(Thailand) Siwarak Tedsungnoen	Retired	N.A.	
2 June 2025	DF	(Thailand) Suporn Peenagatapho	(Thailand) Ratchaburi	Free	(Note: Suporn Peenagatapho returned to Ratchaburi permanently after contract end.)
2 June 2025	FW	(Thailand) Arthit Boodjinda	(Thailand) Khon Kaen United (T2)	Free	
4 June 2025	DF	(Malaysia) (Belgium) Dion Cools	(Japan) Cerezo Osaka (J1)	Undisclosed	
5 June 2025	DF	(Philippines) (Japan) (Ghana) Jefferson Tabinas	(Thailand) Chonburi	Free	
7 June 2025	DF	(South Korea) Kim Min-hyeok	(South Korea) Chungnam Asan (K2)	Free	
9 June 2025	FW	(Thailand) (England) Caelan Tanadon Ryan	(Thailand) Port	Free	
13 June 2025	MF	(Thailand) (England) Leon James	(Thailand) Uthai Thani	Season loan	
16 June 2025	DF	(Thailand) Seksan Ratree	(Thailand) Rayong	Season loan	
21 June 2025	DF	(Austria) Rene Renner	(Austria) Wolfsberger AC (A1)	Free	
29 June 2025	FW	(Thailand) (England) Siam Yapp	(Thailand) Uthai Thani	Free	
2 July 2025	FW	(Brazil) Chrigor	(Malaysia) Selangor (M1)	Undisclosed	
3 July 2025	DF	(Thailand) (Australia) Maxx Creevey	(Thailand) Rayong	Season loan	
4 July 2025	DF	(Guinea-Bissau) (Argentina) (Spain) Marcelo Djaló	(Thailand) Uthai Thani	Free	
11 August 2025	FW	(Italy) (Ghana) Martin Boakye	(Turkey) Boluspor (T1)	Free	
1 September 2025	FW	(Brazil) Lucas Crispim	(Brazil) Fortaleza (B1)	Free	
Academy
10 July 2025	DF	(Thailand) Pongsakron Hanrattana	(Thailand) Nakhon Ratchasima	Season loan	
10 July 2025	MF	(Thailand) Pontakron Hanrattana	(Thailand) Nakhon Ratchasima	Season loan	
13 July 2025	DF	(Thailand) (Netherlands) Phumin William Boers	(Thailand) Sisaket United (T2)	Season loan	
14 July 2025	DF	(Thailand) Chotika Mueanta	(Thailand) Rasisalai United (T2)	Season loan	
19 July 2025	FW	(Thailand) Panuphong Wongpila	(Thailand) Phrae United (T2)	Season loan	
19 July 2025	FW	(Thailand) Winai Aimaot	(Thailand) Phichit United (T2)	Season loan	
27 July 2025	GK	(Thailand) Chayot Junsuy	(Thailand) PT Satun (T3)	Season loan	
30 July 2025	GK	(Thailand) Nopphon Lakhonphon	(Thailand) Nakhon Ratchasima	Season loan	
13 August 2025	GK	(Thailand) Phumeworapol Wannabutr	(Thailand) Rasisalai United (T2)	Season loan	
24 August 2025	DF	(Thailand) (United States) Micah Duchowny	(Mexico) Los Cabos United (M3)	Free	
24 August 2025	MF	(Thailand) (United States) Jonah Duchowny	(Mexico) Los Cabos United (M3)	Free	

Mid-season

Date	Position	Player	Transferred To	Fee	Ref
First team
26 September 2025	FW	(Serbia) Nemanja Nikolić	(Montenegro) Budućnost Podgorica (M2)	Free	
25 November 2025	FW	(Thailand) (Norway) Athit Berg	(Thailand) Port	Season loan	
21 December 2025	MF	(Thailand) (England) Leon James	(Thailand) Nakhon Ratchasima	Season loan	
27 December 2025	FW	(Serbia) Fejsal Mulić	(Uzbekistan) Sogdiana (U1)	Free	
7 January 2026	DF	(Germany) (Kazakhstan) Robert Bauer	(Iraq) Al-Mosul	Free	
16 January 2026	DF	(Thailand) (Sweden) Elias Dolah	(Thailand) BG Pathum United	Season Loan	
23 January 2026	DF	(Indonesia) (Netherlands) Shayne Pattynama	(Indonesia) Persija Jakarta (I1)	Free	
30 January 2026	DF	(Spain) Juan Ibiza	(South Korea) Incheon United (K1)	Season loan till Dec-26	
5 February 2026	FW	(Serbia) (Bosnia and Herzegovina) Đorđe Despotović	(Bosnia and Herzegovina)	Free	
Academy
28 November 2025	DF	(Thailand) Thanison Paibulkijcharoen	(Thailand) Uthai Thani	Season loan	
25 December 2025	DF	(Thailand) Pakawat Taengoakson	(Thailand) Samui United (T3)	Season loan	
25 December 2025	MF	(Thailand) Dutsadee Buranajutanon	(Thailand) Samui United (T3)	Season loan	
25 December 2025	MF	(Thailand) Rattapoom Pankejohn	(Thailand) Samui United (T3)	Season loan	
25 December 2025	FW	(Thailand) Paripan Wongsa	(Thailand) Samui United (T3)	Season loan	
30 December 2025	DF	(Thailand) Singha Marasa	(Thailand) Pattaya United (T2)	Season Loan	
30 December 2025	FW	(Thailand) Piyawat Petra	(Thailand) Pattaya United (T2)	Season Loan	
1 January 2026	GK	(Thailand) Anut Samran	(Thailand) Marines (T3)	Season Loan	
1 January 2026	GK	(Thailand) Kittipong Bunmak	(Thailand) Bankhai United (T3)	Season Loan	
1 January 2026	MF	(Thailand) Sakdisek Kosol	(Thailand) Bankhai United (T3)	Season Loan	
1 January 2026	MF	(Thailand) Supanat Mahawai	(Thailand) Surin (T3)	Season Loan	
1 January 2026	MF	(Thailand) Jirapong Pungviravong	(Thailand) Surin (T3)	Season Loan	
1 January 2026	FW	(Thailand) Chanothai Kongmeng	(Thailand) Surin (T3)	Season Loan	
5 January 2026	DF	(Thailand) Pikanet Laohawiwat	(Thailand) Roi Et PB United (T3)	Season Loan	
5 January 2026	MF	(Thailand) Natapakhan Promthongmee	(Thailand) Roi Et PB United (T3)	Season Loan	
14 January 2026	MF	(Thailand) Pontakron Hanrattana	(Thailand) Nonthaburi United	Free	
16 January 2026	DF	(Thailand) Wanthayawut Nuchkasae	(Thailand) Sisaket United (T2)	Season Loan	

Post-season transfer

Date	Position	Player	Transferred from	Fee	Ref
First team
2026	DF	(Montenegro) Filip Stojković	(Thailand)	Free	

== Friendlies ==
=== Pre-Season Friendly ===
Win Draw Loss

13 July 2025 ASEAN Charity Shield	Buriram United (Thailand)	8–2	(Malaysia) Sabah	Pattani
	Supachai Chaided 3', 26'; Fejsal Mulić 39'; Guilherme Bissoli 49'; Nemanja Nikolić 68', 76', 88'; Kenny Dougall 90+1'		Stuart Wilkin 64'; Azhad Harraz 75'	Stadium: Pattani Province Stadium

19 July 2025	Buriram United (Thailand)	2–1	(Thailand) BG Pathum United	Buriram
	Robert Žulj 40'; Ilhan Fandi 98'		Tomoyuki Doi 28'	Stadium: Buriram City Stadium

27 July 2025	Ayutthaya United (Thailand)	0–3	(Thailand) Buriram United	Ayutthaya
			Supachai Chaided 1'; Fejsal Mulić 33'; Robert Žulj 49'	Stadium: Ayutthaya Province Stadium

2 August 2025	Buriram United (Thailand)	4–1	(Myanmar) Shan United	Buriram
	Fejsal Mulić 29', 60', 90'; Goran Causic 41'		Ryuji Hirota 45+3'	Stadium: Buriram City Stadium

3 August 2025	Buriram United (Thailand)	4–3	(Thailand) Uthai Thani	Buriram
	Robert Žulj 23'; Guilherme Bissoli 67', 83' (pen.); Kenny Dougall 76'		Soe Moe Kyaw 41'; Sirimongkol Rattanapoom 47'; Ben Davis 58'	Stadium: Buriram City Stadium

9 August 2025	Nakhon Ratchasima (Thailand)	1–2	(Thailand) Buriram United	Nakhon Ratchasima
	Dennis Murillo 72'		Fejsal Mulić 58'; Ilhan Fandi 89'	Stadium: 80th Birthday Stadium

10 August 2025	Buriram United (Thailand)	1–1	(Thailand) Rayong	Buriram
	Robert Žulj 23'			Stadium: Buriram City Stadium

=== Mid-Season Friendly ===
11 October 2025 1	Buriram United (Thailand)	1–1	(Thailand) BG Pathum United	Songkhla
				Stadium: Tinsulanon Stadium

== Competitions ==
=== Overview ===
Competition	First match	Last match	Starting round	Final position	Record							
Competition	First match	Last match	Starting round	Final position	Pld	W	D	L	GF	GA	GD	Win %
Thai League 1	16 August 2025	10 May 2026	Matchday 1	Winners	30	22	4	4	76	31	+45	73.33
Thai FA Cup	29 October 2025	31 May 2026	First round	Winners	6	6	0	0	33	1	+32	100.00
Thai League Cup	27 December 2025	8 April 2026	First round	Semi-finals	4	3	0	1	10	3	+7	75.00
AFC Champions League Elite	16 September 2025	18 April 2026	League stage	Quarter-finals	11	4	4	3	13	12	+1	36.36
ASEAN Club Championship	20 August 2025	27 May 2026	Group stage	Winners	9	5	3	1	21	9	+12	55.56
Total					60	40	11	9	153	56	+97	66.67

Last updated: 31 May 2026
Source: Competitions

=== Thai League 1 ===
==== Matches ====
Win Draw Loss

16 August 2025 1	Lamphun Warriors	2–3	Buriram United	Lamphun
	Anan Yodsangwal 32'; Willen 42'; Nuttee Noiwilai (yellow card) 45+8'; Ralph (yellow card) 58'; Noppol Kerdkeaw (yellow card) 88'		Supachai Chaided 20'; Theerathon Bunmathan 50'; Guilherme Bissoli 77'	Stadium: Lamphun Province Stadium; Attendance: 5,130; Referee: Torphong Somsing

23 August 2025 2	Buriram United	5–1	Uthai Thani	Buriram
	Guilherme Bissoli 37', 55', 75'; Supachai Chaided 64'; Suphanat Mueanta 90+4'		Ben Davis 53'; Kristoffer Ryberg (yellow card) 89'	Stadium: Chang Arena; Attendance: 13,477; Referee: Phairot Bunkamnoed

31 August 2025 3	Chiangrai United	1–2	Buriram United	Chiangrai
	Carlos Iury 33' (yellow card) 90+4'; Thanawat Pimoytha (yellow card) 31'; Piyaphon Phanichakul (yellow card) 53'; Sanukran Thinjom (yellow card) 68'; Jorge Eduardo Silva Costa (yellow card) 82' (yellow-red card) 90+9'		Robert Žulj 20'; Sandy Walsh 55'; Supachai Chaided (yellow card) 34'; Kenny Dougall (yellow card) 52'; Goran Čaušić (yellow card) 90+5'	Stadium: Singha Chiangrai Stadium; Attendance: 11,561; Referee: Mongkolchai Pechsr

12 September 2025 4	Buriram United	2–0	PT Prachuap	Buriram
	Guilherme Bissoli 90+5' (pen.), 90+8'; Theerathon Bunmathan (yellow card) 48'		Saharat Kanyaroj (yellow card) 28'	Stadium: Chang Arena; Attendance: 15,094; Referee: Chaireag Ngam-som

21 September 2025 5	Bangkok United	1–2	Buriram United	Pathum Thani
	Richairo Zivkovic 23'; Philipe Maia (yellow card) 90+4'		Supachai Chaided 8'; Fejsal Mulić 45+3'; Pansa Hemviboon (yellow card) 81'; Theerathon Bunmathan (yellow card) 90+4'	Stadium: True BG Stadium; Attendance: 6,329; Referee: Wiwat Jumpaoon

27 September 2025 6	Ayutthaya United	1–4	Buriram United	Ayutthaya
	Yashir Pinto 54'; Passakorn Biaothungnoi (yellow card) 84'		Robert Žulj 28' (pen.); Fejsal Mulić 40', 45+3'; Kenny Dougall 86'	Stadium: Ayutthaya Province Stadium; Attendance: 4,263; Referee: Alongkorn Khonwa

5 October 2025 7	Buriram United	2–2	BG Pathum United	Buriram
	Guilherme Bissoli 31', 45+3' (pen.); Peter Žulj (yellow card) 26'; Sandy Walsh (yellow card) 58'		Seydine N'Diaye 25'; Sanchai Nontasila 33'; Chatmongkol Thongkiri (yellow card) 18'; Joel López Pissano (yellow card) 76'	Stadium: Chang Arena; Attendance: 28,051; Referee: Torpong Somsing

24 December 2025 8 (Rescheduled)	Sukhothai	0–1	Buriram United	Sukhothai
	Saringkan Promsupa (yellow card) 35'; Thiti Thumporn (yellow card) 45+1'; Surawich Lokavit (yellow card) 53'; Pharadon Phatthaphon (yellow card) 90+4'		Robert Žulj 60'; Narubodin Weerawatnodom (yellow card) 12'; Guilherme Bissoli (red card) 36'; Shinnaphat Leeaoh (yellow card) 90+8'	Stadium: Thalay Luang Stadium; Attendance: 6,550; Referee: Pawaran Seejan

26 October 2025 9	Buriram United	2–1	Rayong	Buriram
	Goran Čaušić 8' (yellow card) 89'; Guilherme Bissoli 54'; Robert Žulj (yellow card) 26'; Narubodin Weerawatnodom (yellow card) 76'		Saharat Sontisawat 45+4'; Wasusiwakit Phosririt (yellow card) 90+3'	Stadium: Chang Arena; Attendance: 15,614; Referee: Akom Charoensuk

1 November 2025 10	Buriram United	2–1	Nakhon Ratchasima	Buriram
	Guilherme Bissoli 52'; Robert Žulj 77'; Pansa Hemviboon (yellow card) 31'		Ratthasart Bangsungnoen 18'; Hirotaka Mita (yellow card) 20'; Wendel (yellow card) 41'; Bill Mamadou (yellow card) 52'; Nathaphop Kaewklang (yellow card) 87'	Stadium: Chang Arena; Attendance: 14,588; Referee: Alongkorn Khonwa

9 November 2025 11	Chonburi	4–2	Buriram United	Chonburi
	Oege Sietse van Lingen 16'; Jonathan Bolingi 48'; Santipharp Chan-ngom 86'; Greg Houla 90+13' (pen.); Leslie Ablorh (red card) 30'; Siraphop Wandee (yellow card) 90'		Guilherme Bissoli 52'; Nattapong Sayriya 62' (o.g.); Kenneth Dougall (yellow card) 26'; Supachai Chaided (yellow card) 60'; Pansa Hemviboon (yellow card) 62'	Stadium: Chonburi Stadium; Attendance: 8,453; Referee: Phairot Bunkamnoed

22 November 2025 12	Muangthong United	0–5	Buriram United	Nonthaburi
	Kenan Dünnwald-Turan (yellow card) 32'; Nelson Orji (yellow card) 85'		Robert Žulj 17', 50', 53'; Guilherme Bissoli 44', 83' (yellow card) 85'	Stadium: Thunderdome Stadium; Attendance: 4,346; Referee: Torpong Somsingha

30 November 2025 13	Buriram United	2–0	Ratchaburi	Buriram
	Guilherme Bissoli 32'; Goran Čaušić 70' (yellow card) 85'; Sasalak Haiprakhon (yellow card) 45'		Jérémy Corinus (yellow card) 37'; Negueba (yellow card) 45+2'	Stadium: Chang Arena; Attendance: 14,466; Referee: Peerasan Krataithong

6 December 2025 14	Buriram United	3–1	Kanchanaburi Power	Buriram
	Goran Čaušić 72'; Robert Žulj 90+1'; Narubadin Weerawatnodom 90+5'		Gerson Rodrigues 65'; Aboubakar Kamara (yellow card) 79' (red card) 87'; Kittipong Phoothawchuek (yellow card) 87'	Stadium: Chang Arena; Attendance: 14,382; Referee: Alongkorn Khonwai

14 December 2025 15	Buriram United	1–0	Port	Buriram
	Goran Čaušić 90+1'; Theerathon Bunmathan (yellow card) 14'; Kenneth Dougall (yellow card) 16'; Pansa Hemviboon (yellow card) 87'; Robert Žulj (yellow card) 90+8'; Peter Žulj (yellow card) 90+9'; Sasalak Haiprakhon (yellow card) 90+11'		Peeradol Chamrasamee (yellow card) 56'; Chanukun Karin (red card) 73'; Michael Falkesgaard (yellow card) 85'; Asnawi Mangkualam (yellow card) 87' (yellow-red card) 90+6'	Stadium: Chang Arena; Attendance: 17,151; Referee: Torphong Somsing

9 January 2026 16	Uthai Thani	0–1	Buriram United	Uthai Thani
	Christian Gomis (yellow card) 49'		Suphanat Mueanta 7'; Theerathon Bunmathan (yellow card) 84'	Stadium: Uthai Thani Province Stadium; Attendance: 4,428; Referee: Chaikrit Inboonsong

18 January 2026 17	Buriram United	8–1	Chiangrai United	Buriram
	Suphanat Mueanta 27'; Peter Žulj 31'; Guilherme Bissoli 33'; Thanakrit Chotmuangpak 45+3', 81'; Rubén Sánchez 72'; Eduardo Mancha 85'; Goran Čaušić 89' (pen.)		Jordan Emaviwe 16'; Gabriel Henrique (yellow card) 19'; Banphakit Phrmanee (yellow card) 58'; Thawatchai Inprakhon (yellow card) 63'; Dudu Silva (yellow card) 69'; Sittichok Kannoo (yellow card) 89'	Stadium: Chang Arena; Attendance: 13,603; Referee: Pawara Seejen

4 January 2026 18 (Rescheduled)	PT Prachuap	1–1	Buriram United	Prachuap Khiri Khan
	Tauã 78' (yellow card) 78'; Prasit Jantum (yellow card) 42'; Kanarin Thawornsak (yellow card) 60'		Peter Žulj 46'; Sasalak Haiprakhon (yellow card) 28'	Stadium: Sam Ao Stadium; Attendance: 4,110; Referee: Noppadet Mangngam

1 February 2026 19	Buriram United	0–2	Bangkok United	Buriram
	Guilherme Bissoli (yellow card) 50'; Thanakrit Chotmuangpak (yellow card) 63'		Rivaldinho 8'; Arthur Moura 88'; Picha Autra (yellow card) 27'; Thitipan Puangchan (yellow card) 30'; Philipe Maia (yellow card) 61'; Nebojša Kosović (yellow card) 84'; Rungrath Poomchantuek (yellow card) 90+4'	Stadium: Chang Arena; Attendance: 14,718; Referee: Sivakorn Pu-Udom

12 April 2026 20 (Rescheduled)	Buriram United	2–0	Ayutthaya United	Buriram
	Robert Žulj 11', 90+4'; Phitiwat Sukjitthammakul (yellow card) 43'		Atsadawut Changthong (yellow card) 30'; Diego Carioca (yellow card) 33'; Yashir Pinto (red card) 38'	Stadium: Chang Arena; Attendance: 25,479; Referee: Jirawit Phonkaew

14 February 2026 21	BG Pathum United	1–3	Buriram United	Pathum Thani
	Raniel 32'; Sanchai Nonthasila (yellow card) 80'		Guilherme Bissoli 4'; Suphanat Mueanta 36'; Supachai Chaided 76' (yellow card) 80'; Neil Etheridge (yellow card) 85'	Stadium: True BG Stadium; Attendance: 13,094; Referee: Wiwat Jumpaoon

21 February 2026 22	Buriram United	6–0	Sukhothai	Buriram
	Eduardo Mancha 5'; Pansa Hemviboon 34'; Guilherme Bissoli 48', 86', 90+1'; Robert Žulj 90+2'			Stadium: Chang Arena; Attendance: 13,680; Referee: Satchukorn Saenchu

29 April 2026 23 (Rescheduled)	Rayong	3–0	Buriram United	Rayong
	Saharat Sontisawat 37'; Anon Amornlerdsak 50', 57'; Stênio Junior (yellow card) 56'; Saharat Pongsuwan (yellow card) 59'; Stefan Cebara (yellow card) 68'; João Afonso (yellow card) 89'		Ko Myeong-seok (yellow card) 43'; Pansa Hemviboon (yellow card) 65'; Peter Žulj (yellow card) 88'	Stadium: Rayong Province Stadium; Attendance: 6,742; Referee: Sarayut Jakngoen

7 March 2025 24	Nakhon Ratchasima	0–3	Buriram United	Nakhon Ratchasima
	Ratthasart Bangsungnoen (yellow card) 82'		Suphanat Mueanta 12'; Sasalak Haiprakhon 37'; Rubén Sánchez 60'; Phitiwat Sukjitthammakul (yellow card) 83'; Shinnaphat Leeaoh (yellow card) 89'	Stadium: 80th Birthday Stadium; Attendance: 5,199; Referee: Kitisak Pikunngoen

14 March 2025 25	Buriram United	5–0	Chonburi	Buriram
	Guilherme Bissoli 16', 33'; Rubén Sánchez 45+3'; Sandy Walsh 47'; Supachai Chaided 90+3'			Stadium: Chang Arena; Attendance: 18,455; Referee: Pawara Seejen

22 March 2025 26	Buriram United	2–1	Muangthong United	Buriram
	Rubén Sánchez 12'; Thanakrit Chotmuangpak 44'; Kenny Dougall (yellow card) 7'; Peter Žulj (yellow card) 90+1'		Marko Šarić 33' (penalty missed) 8; Dong-Su Kim (yellow card) 57'; Siradanai Phosri (yellow card) 84'; Tristan Do (yellow card) 84'; Stefan Tsonkov (yellow card) 90+4'	Stadium: Chang Arena; Attendance: 23,555; Referee: Peerasan Krataithong

4 April 2025 27	Ratchaburi	2–2	Buriram United	Ratchaburi
	Gleyson Oliveira 21'; Jesse Curran 88'; Thanawat Suengchitthawon (yellow card) 62'; Denilson (yellow card) 90+4'		Guilherme Bissoli 8'; Narubodin Weerawatnodom 48' (yellow card) 63'; Supachai Chaided (yellow card) 57'	Stadium: Ratchaburi Stadium; Attendance: 8,379; Referee: Panumas Phansamo

26 April 2025 28	Kanchanaburi Power	1–3	Buriram United	Kanchanaburi
	Chayapipat Supunpasuch 23'; Prachya Fudsuparp (yellow card) 31'; Ryhan Stewart (yellow card) 45+1'; Anumanthan Kumar (yellow card) 54'; Santipap Ratniyorm (yellow card) 80'		Guilherme Bissoli 48'; Pansa Hemviboon 73'; Sasalak Haiprakhon 79'; Kenny Dougall (yellow card) 53'	Stadium: Kanchanaburi Province Stadium; Attendance: 11,461; Referee: Pawara Seejen

2 May 2026 29 (Rescheduled)	Port	3–1	Buriram United	Bangkok
	Worachit Kanitsribampen 4'; Leonardo Kalil 22'; Lucas Tocantins 45+2'; Noboru Shimura (yellow card) 38'		Peter Žulj 90+5'; Sandy Walsh (yellow card) 18'; Shinnaphat Leeaoh (yellow card) 50'	Stadium: PAT Stadium; Referee: Torphong Somsing

10 May 2025 30	Buriram United	1–1	Lamphun Warriors	Buriram
	Robert Žulj 79'		Surat Suriyachai 90+9'; Aly Cissokho (yellow card) 63'	Stadium: Chang Arena; Referee: Alongkorn Khonwai

Pos	Team	Pld	W	D	L	GF	GA	GD	Pts	Qualification or relegation
1	Buriram United (C)	30	22	4	4	76	31	+45	70	Qualification to the AFC Champions League Elite League stage and ASEAN Club Championship group stage
2	Port	30	18	6	6	59	23	+36	60	Qualification to the AFC Champions League Elite League stage and ASEAN Club Championship group stage
3	Ratchaburi	30	18	5	7	55	30	+25	59	Qualification to the AFC Champions League Elite League stage and ASEAN Club Championship group stage
4	BG Pathum United	30	14	10	6	45	29	+16	52	Qualification for AFC Champions League Two group stage
5	Bangkok United	30	13	11	6	43	32	+11	50	

Source: Thai League 1 2025–26
Rules for classification: 1) Points; 2) Goal difference; 3) Goals scored.
(C) Champions

=== Thai FA Cup ===
Win Draw Loss

29 October 2025 Rd 2	Buriram United	12–0	Warin Chamrap FC (T4)	Buriram
	Fejsal Mulić 21' (pen.), 34', 49'; Thiraphon Phrinphun 26' (o.g.); Ilhan Fandi 39', 45+2'; Athit Berg 67'; Ratthanakorn Maikami 72'; Narubadin Weerawatnodom 75'; Shinnaphat Leeaoh 79'; Thanakrit Chotmuangpak 81', 90'			Stadium: Chang Arena; Attendance: 11,413; Referee: Manuschai Chawong

20/21 December 2025 Rd of 32	(T3) Customs United	1–5	Buriram United	Samut Prakan
	Aitsara Suktaeng 7'; Nakin Wisetchat (yellow card) 27'; Raungchai Choothongchai (yellow card) 43'		Guilherme Bissoli 51', 79', 90+3'; Suphanat Mueanta 82'; Thanakrit Chotmuangpak 90+6'; Kenneth Dougall (yellow card) 90+4'	Stadium: Stadium of Customs Department, Lad Krabang 54; Attendance: 1,785; Referee: Akom Charoensuk

14 January 2026 Rd of 16	Buriram United	4–0	Pattani (T2)	Buriram
	Guilherme Bissoli 44', 64', 87'; Rubén Sánchez 74'		Kirati Kaewnongdang (yellow card) 57'; Marlon Henrique (yellow card) 90+2'	Stadium: Chang Arena; Attendance: 18,015; Referee: Jirawit Phonkaew

25 February 2026 Quarter Final	Buriram United	6–0	Khon Kaen United (T2)	Buriram
	Robert Žulj 39', 45+4', 60'; Emmanuel Toku 45+5', 89'; Nathakorn Rattanasuwan 67'			Stadium: Chang Arena; Attendance: 10,292; Referee: Chaikrit Inboonsong

17 May 2026 Semi Final	Buriram United	5–0	Ayutthaya United	Bangkok
	Sandy Walsh 16', 40'; Kingsley Schindler 62'; Supachai Chaided 70'; Robert Žulj 80'; Phitiwat Sukjitthammakul (yellow card) 30'		Wellington Priori (yellow card) 15'; Baek Sung-Dong (yellow card) 60'; Natcha Promsomboon (yellow card) 67'; Chanon Tamma (yellow card) 90'	Stadium: PAT Stadium; Referee: Sivakorn Pu-Udom

31 May 2026 Final	Buriram United	1–0 (a.e.t.)	PT Prachuap
	Robert Žulj 94' (yellow card) 99'; Curtis Good (yellow card) 20'; Supachai Chaided (yellow card) 39'; Kingsley Schindler (yellow card) 80'; Shinnaphat Leeaoh (yellow card) 84'; Kenny Dougall (yellow card) 111'		Edgar Méndez (yellow card) 11' (red card) 105+4'; Apisit Sorada (yellow card) 35'; Airton (yellow card) 85'; Wanchat Choosong (yellow card) 97'; Tauã (yellow card) 105'; Jehhanafee Mamah (yellow card) 113'	Referee: Torphong Somsing

=== Thai League Cup ===
27 December 2025 Rd of 32	(T3) Thonburi United	0–4	Buriram United	Bangkok
			Guilherme Bissoli 41', 81'; Thanakrit Chotmuangpak 71'; Curtis Good 90+1'	Stadium: Thonburi Stadium; Attendance: 2,250; Referee: Sila Jinnigorn

21 January 2026 Rd of 16	Buriram United	3–2	PT Prachuap (T1)	Buriram
	Suphanat Mueanta 9', 67'; Rubén Sánchez 61'		Tauã 74'; Jirapan Phasukihan 81' (yellow card) 71'; Edgar Mendez (yellow card) 45+1'	Stadium: Chang Arena; Attendance: 10,927; Referee: Noppadet Mangngam

18 March 2026 Quarter Final	(T2) Pattani	0–3	Buriram United	Mueang, Pattani
	Adithep Chaisrianan (yellow card) 39'; Marlon Silva (yellow card) 90+4'		Kingsley Schindler 33'; Supachai Chaided 37'; Shinnaphat Leeaoh 67'; Curtis Good (yellow card) 35'	Stadium: Pattani PAO. Stadium; Attendance: 12,000; Referee: Kotchapoom Meesridaecha

8 April 2026 Semi Final	Buriram United	0–1	BG Pathum United	Chonburi
	Pansa Hemviboon (yellow card) 39'; Peter Žulj (yellow card) 76'		Surachart Sareepim 49' (yellow card) 40'; Warinthon Jamnongwat (yellow card) 43'; Ekanit Panya (yellow card) 86'	Stadium: Chonburi Stadium; Attendance: 5,237; Referee: Torphong Somsing

=== AFC Champions League Elite ===
==== League stage ====
16 September 2025 MD 1	Buriram United (Thailand)	2–1	(Malaysia) Johor Darul Ta'zim	Buriram, Thailand
	Suphanat Mueanta 50'; Robert Žulj 53'; Filip Stojković (yellow card) 57'; Peter Zulj (yellow card) 90+4'; Ko Myeong-seok (yellow card) 90+5'	Report	Antonio Glauder 28'; Óscar Arribas (yellow card) 88'	Stadium: Chang Arena; Attendance: 21,937; Referee: Alireza Faghani (Australia)

30 September 2025 MD 2	FC Seoul (South Korea)	3–0	(Thailand) Buriram United	Seoul, South Korea
	Choi Jun 38'; Jeong Seung-won 45+3'; Lucas Rodrigues 68' (yellow card) 27'	Report	Robert Zulj (yellow card) 61'	Stadium: Seoul World Cup Stadium; Attendance: 6,443; Referee: Abdulrahman Al-Jassim (Qatar)

21 October 2025 MD 3	Melbourne City (Australia)	2–1	(Thailand) Buriram United	Buriram, Thailand
	Elbasan Rashani 83'; Max Caputo 90+7'	Report	Goran Čaušić 72' (yellow card) 90+1'; Peter Zulj (yellow card) 42'; Kenny Dougall (yellow card) 44'; Supachai Chaided (yellow card) 62'	Stadium: Chang Arena; Attendance: 2,018; Referee: Yoshimi Yamashita (Japan)

4 November 2025 MD 4	Buriram United (Thailand)	2–0	(China) Shanghai Port	Buriram, Thailand
	Supachai Chaided 15'; Curtis Good 65'	Report		Stadium: Chang Arena; Attendance: 14,161; Referee: Asker Nadjafaliev (Uzbekistan)

26 November 2025 MD 5	Ulsan HD FC (South Korea)	0–0	(Thailand) Buriram United	Ulsan, South Korea
	Milosz Trojak (yellow card) 82'; Back In-Woo (yellow card) 90'	Report	Theerathon Bunmathan (yellow card) 87'; Robert Zulj (yellow card) 90+4'	Stadium: Ulsan Munsu Football Stadium; Attendance: 2,598; Referee: Ahmad Al-Ali (Kuwait)

9 December 2025 MD 6	Buriram United (Thailand)	2–2	(South Korea) Gangwon FC	Buriram, Thailand
	Ko Myeong-Seok 58'; Suphanat Mueanta 66'; Kenny Dougall (yellow card) 47'; Guilherme Bissoli (yellow card) 72'	Report	Mo Jae-Hyeon 33'; Kim Dae-Won 75' (yellow card) 22'; Park Ho-Yeong (yellow card) 18'; Kang Yun-Gu (yellow card) 78'	Stadium: Chang Arena; Attendance: 15,329; Referee: Omar Al-Ali (United Arab Emirates)

10 February 2026 MD 7	Chengdu Rongcheng (China)	0–1	(Thailand) Buriram United	Chengdu, China
	Liao Lisheng (yellow card) 32'; Han Pengfei (yellow card) 45+5'; Hu Hetao (yellow card) 50'; Rômulo (yellow card) 60'; Wei Shihao (yellow card) 62'; Wang Dongsheng (yellow card) 81'	Report	Guilherme Bissoli 51'; Goran Čaušić (yellow card) 17'; Kingsley Schindler (yellow card) 19'; Sandy Walsh (yellow card) 38'; Neil Etheridge (yellow card) 57'; Rubén Sánchez (yellow card) 75'; Peter Zulj (yellow card) 90'	Stadium: Phoenix Hill Football Stadium; Attendance: 40,676; Referee: Yusuke Araki (Japan)

17 February 2026 MD 8	Buriram United (Thailand)	2–0	(China) Shanghai Shenhua	Buriram, Thailand
	Curtis Good 11'; Suphanat Mueanta 22'; Robert Žulj (yellow card) 31'	Report	Rafael Ratão (yellow card) 31' (yellow-red card) 35'; Liu Chengyu (yellow card) 88'	Stadium: Chang Arena; Attendance: 15,971; Referee: Abdulrahman Al-Jassim (Qatar)

Pos	Team	Pld	W	D	L	GF	GA	GD	Pts	Qualification
2	(Japan) Vissel Kobe	8	5	1	2	14	7	+7	16	Advance to round of 16
3	(Japan) Sanfrecce Hiroshima	8	4	3	1	10	6	+4	15	Advance to round of 16
4	(Thailand) Buriram United	8	4	2	2	10	8	+2	14	Advance to round of 16
5	(Australia) Melbourne City	8	4	2	2	9	7	+2	14	Advance to round of 16
6	(Malaysia) Johor Darul Ta'zim	8	3	2	3	8	7	+1	11	Advance to round of 16

Source: AFC
Rules for classification: 1) points; 2) goal difference; 3) number of goals scored; 4) number of matches won; 5) penalty shoot-out if only two teams remain tied and played each other on the final matchday 6) fair play ranking; 7) drawing of lots

==== Knockout stage ====
3 March 2026 R16 Leg 1	Melbourne City (Australia)	1–1	(Thailand) Buriram United	Melbourne, Australia
	Benjamin Mazzeo 90+4'; Elbasan Rashani (yellow card) 81'	Report	Guilherme Bissoli 37' (yellow card) 90+5'; Goran Čaušić (yellow card) 12'; Sandy Walsh (yellow card) 68'; Peter Žulj (yellow card) 82'	Stadium: Melbourne Rectangular Stadium; Attendance: 1,478; Referee: Khalid Al-Turais (Saudi Arabia)

10 March 2025 R16 Leg 2	Buriram United (Thailand)	0–0 (a.e.t.) (1–1 agg.) (4–2 p)	(Australia) Melbourne City	Buriram, Thailand
	Robert Zulj (red card) 20'; Guilherme Bissoli (yellow card) 58'; Filip Stojković (yellow card) 73'; Kenny Dougall (yellow card) 76'; Peter Žulj (yellow card) 90+1'; Neil Etheridge (yellow card) 90+5'; Rubén Sánchez (yellow card) 118'	Report	Germán Ferreyra (red card) 118'	Stadium: Chang Arena; Attendance: 22,950; Referee: Kim Jong-Hyeok (South Korea)
	Penalties
	Goran Čaušić (penalty scored); Kingsley Schindler (penalty scored); Peter Žulj (penalty scored); Kenny Dougall (penalty scored)		Max Caputo (penalty scored); Ryan Teague (penalty missed); Aziz Behich (penalty missed); Marcus Younis (penalty scored)

18 April 2026 Quarter Final	Buriram United (Thailand)	2–3 (a.e.t.)	(United Arab Emirates) Shabab Al Ahli	Jeddah, Saudi Arabia
	Guilherme Bissoli 65' (pen.); Peter Žulj 71' (yellow card) 82'; Kenny Dougall (yellow card) 53'; Sandy Walsh (yellow card) 90+1'; Curtis Good (yellow card) 103'; Goran Causic (yellow card) 117'; Ko Myeong-seok (red card) 120+4'	Report	Peter Žulj 14' (o.g.); Saeid Ezatolahi 50'; Renan 94'; Breno Cascardo Lemos (yellow card) 57'	Stadium: Prince Abdullah Al-Faisal Sports City Stadium; Attendance: 227; Referee: Abdulrahman Al-Jassim (Qatar)

=== ASEAN Club Championship ===
==== Group stage ====
Pos	Team	Pld	W	D	L	GF	GA	GD	Pts	Qualification	BRU	SEL	BGP	CAH	BGT	DHC
1	(Thailand) Buriram United	5	2	3	0	14	5	+9	9	Advance to knockout stage	—	1–1	—	1–1	—	6–0
2	(Malaysia) Selangor	5	2	3	0	9	5	+4	9	Advance to knockout stage	—	—	1–1	2–0	4–2	—
3	(Thailand) BG Pathum United	5	2	2	1	9	7	+2	8		2–2	—	—	2–1	—	2–0
4	(Vietnam) Công An Hà Nội	5	2	1	2	9	6	+3	7		—	—	—	—	6–1	1–0
5	(Singapore) Tampines Rovers	5	2	0	3	10	17	−7	6		1–4	—	3–2	—	—	—
6	(Philippines) Dynamic Herb Cebu	5	0	1	4	2	13	−11	1		—	1–1	—	—	1–3	—

Source: ASEAN United FC
Rules for classification: Tiebreakers

20 August 2025 1	Buriram United (Thailand)	1–1	(Malaysia) Selangor	Buriram, Thailand
	Peter Žulj 90+6'	Report	Chrigor 38'; Harith Haiqal (yellow card) 64'; Kalamullah Al Hafiz (yellow card) 90+7'; Kevin Deeromram (yellow card) 90+8'; Richmond Ankrah (yellow card) 90+10'	Stadium: Chang Arena; Attendance: 15,168; Referee: Kim Woo-sung (South Korea)

24 September 2025 2	BG Pathum United (Thailand)	2–2	(Thailand) Buriram United	Pathum Thani, Thailand
	Chanathip Songkrasin 23'; Surachat Sareepim 45+3' (yellow card) 10'; Chatmongkol Thongkiri (yellow card) 37'; Chanon Thamma (yellow card) 90+3'	Report	Sasalak Haiprakhon 20'; Guilherme Bissoli 35' (pen.); Ko Myeong-seok (yellow card) 26'; Filip Stojković (yellow card) 39'	Stadium: True BG Stadium; Attendance: 9,781; Referee: Sami Taher Al Ismail (Saudi Arabia)

4 December 2025 3	Buriram United (Thailand)	1–1	(Vietnam) Cong An Hanoi	Buriram, Thailand
	Guilherme Bissoli 90+1' (pen.) (yellow card) 26'; Robert Zulj (red card) 51'; Sasalak Haiprakhon (yellow card) 67'	Report	Léo Artur 10'; Lê Pham Thành Long (yellow card) 45+2'; Nguyen Filip (yellow card) 75'; Lê Van Dô (yellow card) 90+4'	Stadium: Chang Arena; Attendance: 14,852; Referee: Koki Nagamine (Japan)

28 January 2026 4	BG Tampines Rovers (Singapore)	1–4	(Thailand) Buriram United	Bishan, Singapore
	Taufik Suparno 90+1'; Trent Buhagiar (yellow card) 83'	Report	Suphanat Mueanta 32'; Guilherme Bissoli 52', 70' (pen.); Goran Čaušić 88'	Stadium: Bishan Stadium; Attendance: 908; Referee: Koji Takasaki (Japan)

4 February 2026 5	Buriram United (Thailand)	6–0	(Philippines) DH Cebu	Buriram, Thailand
	Sandy Walsh 18'; Goran Čaušić 31'; Kingsley Schindler 34'; Phitiwat Sukjitthammakul 38'; Nathakorn Rattanasuwan 54', 90+1'	Report	Göktug Demiroglu (yellow card) 22'	Stadium: Chang Arena; Referee: Shen Yinhao (China)

==== Knockout stage ====
6 May 2026 Semi Final Leg 1	Johor Darul Ta'zim (Malaysia)	1–3	(Thailand) Buriram United	Johor, Malaysia
	Ager Aketxe 90+2'; Antonio Glauder (yellow card) 29'; Óscar Arribas (yellow card) 51'; Nene (yellow card) 83'	Report	Guilherme Bissoli 34', 90+4'; Goran Čaušić 45+2'; Supachai Chaided (yellow card) 49'; Kenneth Dougall (yellow card) 51'; Theerathon Bunmathan (yellow card) 88'	Stadium: Sultan Ibrahim Stadium; Attendance: 18,944; Referee: Qasim Al-Hatmi (Oman)

13 May 2026 Semi Final Leg 2	Buriram United (Thailand)	1–2 (a.e.t.) (4–3 agg.)	(Malaysia) Johor Darul Ta'zim	Buriram, Thailand
	Kingsley Schindler 98'; Pansa Hemviboon (yellow card) 10'; Curtis Good (yellow card) 33'; Kenneth Dougall (yellow card) 35'; Neil Etheridge (yellow card) 44'; Guilherme Bissoli (yellow card) 64' (yellow-red card) 103'; Goran Čaušić (red card) 115'; Peter Zulj (yellow card) 116'	Report	Bergson 45+4' (pen.); Marcos Guilherme 62'; Ager Aketxe (yellow card) 34'; Óscar Arribas (yellow card) 38'; Eddy Israfilov (yellow card) 55'; Mohamadou Sumareh (yellow card) 114'	Stadium: Chang Arena; Referee: Kim Woo-sung (South Korea)

20 May 2026 Final Leg 1	Selangor (Malaysia)	0–1	(Thailand) Buriram United	Petaling Jaya, Malaysia
	Hugo Boumous (yellow card) 35'; Alvin Fortes (yellow card) 45+4'; Zikri Khalili (yellow card) 54'; Harith Haiqal (yellow card) 90+4'	Report	Suphanat Mueanta 25' (yellow card) 57'; Theerathon Bunmathan (yellow card) 35'; Supachai Chaided (yellow card) 72'; Ko Myeong-Seok (yellow card) 81'; Neil Etheridge (yellow card) 86'	Stadium: Petaling Jaya Stadium; Referee: Rustam Lutfullin (Uzbekistan)

27 May 2026 Final Leg 2	Buriram United (Thailand)	2–1 (3–1 agg.)	(Malaysia) Selangor	Buriram, Thailand
	Suphanat Mueanta 28' (yellow card) 61'; Theerathon Bunmathan 55' (red card) 90+9'; Robert Žulj (yellow card) 88'; Shinnaphat Leeaoh (yellow card) 90+9'	Report	Syahir Bashah 18'; Alvin Fortes (yellow card) 85'; Chrigor (yellow card) 85'; Hugo Boumous (yellow card) 86'	Stadium: Chang Arena; Referee: Hiroki Kasahara (Japan)

== Statistics ==
=== Appearances and goals ===
As of 31 May 26

No.	Pos.	Player	Thai League		FA Cup		League Cup		AFC Champions League Elite		ASEAN Club Championship		Total	
No.	Pos.	Player	Apps	Goals	Apps	Goals	Apps	Goals	Apps	Goals	Apps	Goals	Apps	Goals
2	MF	(Thailand) Sasalak Haiprakhon	20+4	2	2+3	0	2+2	0	1+1	0	7+1	1	43	3
3	DF	(Thailand) Pansa Hemviboon	18+4	2	3	0	3	0	1	0	5+2	0	36	2
5	MF	(Thailand) Theerathon Bunmathan	16+7	1	4+1	0	3+1	0	1+5	0	7+2	1	47	2
6	DF	(Australia) Curtis Good	0	0	3	0	3	1	11	2	5	0	22	3
7	FW	(Brazil) Guilherme Bissoli	21+4	23	3	6	4	2	11	3	8	6	51	40
8	MF	(Thailand) Ratthanakorn Maikami	2+3	0	3+1	2	0	0	0	0	0+2	0	12	1
9	FW	(Thailand) Supachai Chaided	14+6	5	2+2	1	2	1	5+3	1	5+1	0	40	8
10	FW	(Thailand) Suphanat Mueanta	11+8	5	3+1	1	1+1	2	5+2	3	5+3	3	41	14
13	GK	(Philippines) (England) Neil Etheridge	29	0	2	0	2	0	11	0	5	0	49	0
14	DF	(Indonesia) (Belgium) Sandy Walsh	14+5	2	1+1	2	0+3	0	5+3	0	2	1	34	5
15	DF	(Thailand) Narubadin Weerawatnodom	13+6	2	4+1	1	2+2	0	0	0	0+1	0	29	3
16	DF	(Thailand) (Australia) Kenny Dougall	22+3	1	2+1	0	2	0	7+1	0	6	0	44	1
17	FW	(Singapore) (South Africa) Ilhan Fandi	1+5	0	1	2	0	0	0+2	0	0	0	9	2
19	MF	(Ghana) (Germany) Kingsley Schindler	0	0	3+1	1	2	1	9	0	5	2	20	4
22	DF	(South Korea) Ko Myeong-seok	18+4	0	3	0	1+1	0	9	0	5	0	41	0
23	MF	(Serbia) Goran Čaušić	19+9	5	0	0	0	0	11	1	6	3	46	9
26	FW	(Ghana) Emmanuel Toku	0	0	4	2	3	0	1	0	1	0	9	2
27	MF	(Thailand) Phitiwat Sukjitthammakul	14+11	0	5+1	0	3	0	0+3	0	3+6	1	46	1
28	FW	(Spain) Rubén Sánchez	6+2	4	1	1	2	1	0+4	0	0	0	15	6
29	GK	(Thailand) Korraphat Nareechan	0+1	0	2	0	0	0	0	0	0	0	3	0
30	DF	(Montenegro) Filip Stojković	2	0	0	0	0	0	6+2	0	3	0	13	0
32	FW	(Austria) (Croatia) Robert Žulj	23+7	13	3	5	0	0	10	1	4+1	0	48	19
33	MF	(Thailand) Thanakrit Chotmuangpak	9+7	3	2+2	3	1+3	1	0	0	1+2	0	27	7
34	GK	(Thailand) Chatchai Budprom	1	0	2	0	2	0	0	0	4	0	9	0
35	GK	(Thailand) Kittipong Boonmak	0	0	0	0	0	0	0	0	0	0	0	0
40	DF	(Brazil) Eduardo Mancha	7	2	0	0	0	0	4	0	1	0	12	2
44	MF	(Austria) (Croatia) Peter Žulj	16+10	2	0	0	1+1	0	10	1	7+1	1	46	4
48	DF	(Thailand) Wanthayawut Nutkrasae	0	0	0	0	0	0	0	0	0	0	0	0
54	FW	(Thailand) Nathakorn Rattanasuwan	0+3	0	0+2	1	0+1	0	0	0	0+1	2	7	3
75	DF	(Thailand) Shinnaphat Leeaoh	14+1	0	3+2	1	3+1	1	0+1	0	0+6	0	31	2
77	FW	(Denmark) Kasper Junker	0	0	0	0	0	0	0+3	0	0	0	3	0
Players who have left on loan
4	MF	(Thailand) (England) Leon James	0	0	0	0	0	0	0	0	0	0	0	0
18	FW	(Thailand) (Norway) Athit Berg	0	0	1	1	0	0	0	0	0	0	1	1
20	DF	(Guinea-Bissau) (Spain) Marcelo Djaló	0	0	0	0	0	0	0	0	0	0	0	0
24	DF	(Thailand) (Sweden) Elias Dolah	0	0	0+1	0	0	0	0	0	0	0	1	0
40	DF	(Philippines) (Japan) Jefferson Tabinas	0	0	0	0	0	0	0	0	0	0	0	0
49	MF	(Thailand) Piyawat Petra	0	0	0	0	0	0	0	0	0	0	0	0
50	DF	(Thailand) Singha Marasa	0	0	0	0	0+1	0	0	0	0	0	1	0
55	DF	(Spain) Juan Ibiza	0	0	1	0	0	0	1+1	0	2	0	5	0
70	FW	(Thailand) Jirapong Pungviravong	0	0	0	0	0	0	0	0	0	0	0	0
89	MF	(Thailand) Pongsakron Hanrattana	0	0	0	0	0	0	0	0	0	0	0	0
91	FW	(Thailand) (Netherlands) Phumin William Boers	0	0	0	0	0	0	0	0	0	0	0	0
92	DF	(Thailand) Thanison Paibulkijcharoen	0	0	1	0	0	0	0	0	0	0	1	0
95	MF	(Thailand) Seksan Ratree	0	0	0	0	0	0	0	0	0	0	0	0
??	GK	(Thailand) Phumworraphon Wannabutr	0	0	0	0	0	0	0	0	0	0	0	0
Players who have left permanently
??	FW	(Brazil) Lucas Crispim	0	0	0	0	0	0	0	0	0	0	0	0
4	DF	(Germany) (Kazakhstan) Robert Bauer	8+1	0	0	0	0	0	1+1	0	0	0	11	0
11	MF	(Thailand) Pathompol Charoenrattanapirom	1+7	0	1+1	0	1	0	0	0	0+3	0	14	0
20	DF	(Indonesia) (Netherlands) Shayne Pattynama	6	0	0+1	0	0	0	1+2	0	0	0	10	0
21	FW	(Serbia) (Bosnia and Herzegovina) Đorđe Despotović	0	0	0	0	0	0	0+2	0	0	0	2	0
25	FW	(Serbia) Nemanja Nikolić	0	0	0	0	0	0	0	0	0	0	0	0
99	FW	(Serbia) Fejsal Mulić	5+3	3	1	3	0	0	0+2	0	0	0	11	6
