= 2025–26 ASEAN Club Championship group stage =

International football club competition in Southeast Asia

The 2025–26 ASEAN Club Championship group stage began on 20 August 2025 and ended on 5 February 2026. A total of 12 teams competed in the group stage to decide four places in the knockout stage of the 2025–26 ASEAN Club Championship.

Bangkok United, Thep Xanh Nam Dinh, Johor Darul Ta'zim and Selangor made their debut appearance in the group stage.

== Draw ==
The draw for the group stage was held on 4 July 2025 in Bangkok, Thailand. The 14 teams were drawn into two groups of seven.

Teams from the same association could not be drawn into the same group, with the exception of Thailand, where a maximum of two Thai teams (one being the title holder) could be placed in the same group.

A total of 6 national associations are represented in the group stage.

=== Teams and seeding ===
Below were the participating teams, grouped by their seeding pot. They included:

- 10 teams which entered in this stage
- 2 winners of the play-off round.

Key to colours
Group winners and runners-up advanced to semi-finals

Pot 1
| No. | Team |
|---|---|
| 1 | (Thailand) Buriram United |
| 2 | (Thailand) Bangkok United |

Pot 4
| No. | Team |
|---|---|
| 7 | (Vietnam) Công An Hà Nội |
| 8 | (Singapore) Lion City Sailors |

Pot 2
| No. | Team |
|---|---|
| 3 | (Thailand) BG Pathum United |
| 4 | (Malaysia) Johor Darul Ta'zim |

Pot 5
| No. | Team |
|---|---|
| 9 | (Singapore) Tampines Rovers |
| 10 | (Cambodia) PKR Svay Rieng |

Pot 3
| No. | Team |
|---|---|
| 5 | (Malaysia) Selangor |
| 6 | (Vietnam) Nam Định |

Pot 6 (Note: Identity of the two play-off winners was unknown at the time of the draw.)
| No. | Team |
|---|---|
| 11 | (Philippines) Dynamic Herb Cebu |
| 12 | (Myanmar) Shan United |

Notes

1. Title Holders (TH): ASEAN Club Championship title holders, automatically placed into Pot 1 as top seed.

== Format ==
The group stage is a single round-robin format.

Initially, the top four teams from each group advance to a quarter-final stage. However, following the withdrawal of Indonesian teams, the quarter-finals were removed; only the top two teams will qualify for the semi-finals.

=== Tiebreakers ===
The teams were ranked according to points (3 points for a win, 1 point for a draw, 0 points for a loss). If tied on points, tiebreakers were applied in the following order (Regulations Article 17.2):

1. Points in head-to-head matches among tied teams;
2. Goal difference in head-to-head matches among tied teams;
3. Goals scored in head-to-head matches among tied teams;
4. If more than two teams were tied, and after applying all head-to-head criteria above, a subset of teams were still tied, all head-to-head criteria above were reapplied exclusively to this subset of teams;
5. Goal difference in all group matches;
6. Goals scored in all group matches;
7. Penalty shoot-out if only two teams playing each other in the last round of the group are tied;
8. Disciplinary points (yellow card = 1 point, red card as a result of two yellow cards = 3 points, direct red card = 3 points, yellow card followed by direct red card = 4 points);
9. Drawing of lots.

== Groups ==
=== Group A ===
| Pos | Team | Pld | W | D | L | GF | GA | GD | Pts | Qualification | BRU | SEL | BGP | CAH | BGT | DHC |
|---|---|---|---|---|---|---|---|---|---|---|---|---|---|---|---|---|
| 1 | (Thailand) Buriram United | 5 | 2 | 3 | 0 | 14 | 5 | +9 | 9 | Advance to knockout stage | — | 1–1 | — | 1–1 | — | 6–0 |
| 2 | (Malaysia) Selangor | 5 | 2 | 3 | 0 | 9 | 5 | +4 | 9 | Advance to knockout stage | — | — | 1–1 | 2–0 | 4–2 | — |
| 3 | (Thailand) BG Pathum United | 5 | 2 | 2 | 1 | 9 | 7 | +2 | 8 | | 2–2 | — | — | 2–1 | — | 2–0 |
| 4 | (Vietnam) Công An Hà Nội | 5 | 2 | 1 | 2 | 9 | 6 | +3 | 7 | | — | — | — | — | 6–1 | 1–0 |
| 5 | (Singapore) Tampines Rovers | 5 | 2 | 0 | 3 | 10 | 17 | −7 | 6 | | 1–4 | — | 3–2 | — | — | — |
| 6 | (Philippines) Dynamic Herb Cebu | 5 | 0 | 1 | 4 | 2 | 13 | −11 | 1 | | — | 1–1 | — | — | 1–3 | — |

Source: ASEAN United FC
Rules for classification: Tiebreakers
20 August 2025
19:00 UTC+8

| Dynamic Herb Cebu (Philippines) | 1–3 | (Singapore) Tampines Rovers |
|---|---|---|
| A. Sy 22' | Report | Higashikawa 2'; D. Fox 19'; Buhagiar 90+8' |

Rizal Memorial Stadium, Manila
Attendance: 803
Referee: Wiwat Jumpao-on (Thailand)
20 August 2025
19:00 UTC+7

| Buriram United (Thailand) | 1–1 | (Malaysia) Selangor |
|---|---|---|
| P. Žulj 90+6' | Report | Chrigor 38' |

Chang Arena, Buriram
Attendance: 15,168
Referee: Kim Woo-sung (South Korea)
20 August 2025
19:00 UTC+7

| BG Pathum United (Thailand) | 2–1 | (Vietnam) Công An Hà Nội |
|---|---|---|
| Chanathip 58', 90+7' | Report | Alan 20' |

True BG Stadium, Pathum Thani
Attendance: 5,529
Referee: Asker Nadjafaliev (Uzbekistan)

24 September 2025
19:00 UTC+7

| BG Pathum United (Thailand) | 2–2 | (Thailand) Buriram United |
|---|---|---|
| Chanathip 23'; Surachat 45+3' | Report | Sasalak 20'; Bissoli 35' (pen.) |

True BG Stadium, Pathum Thani
Attendance: 9,781
Referee: Sami Al-Ismail (Saudi Arabia)
24 September 2025
19:30 UTC+7

| Công An Hà Nội (Vietnam) | 1–0 | (Philippines) Dynamic Herb Cebu |
|---|---|---|
| Cao Pendant Quang Vinh 89' | Report |

Hàng Đẫy Stadium, Hanoi
Attendance: 3,893
Referee: Ryo Tanimoto (Japan)
24 September 2025
21:00 UTC+8

| Selangor (Malaysia) | 4–2 | (Singapore) Tampines Rovers |
|---|---|---|
| Shuya 18' (o.g.); Clough 30'; Faisal 51'; Fortes 58' | Report | Koya 41' (pen.); Higashikawa 65' |

Petaling Jaya Stadium, Petaling Jaya
Attendance: 1,815
Referee: Omar Al-Yaqoubi (Oman)

3 December 2025
19:00 UTC+7

| Buriram United (Thailand) | 1–1 | (Vietnam) Công An Hà Nội |
|---|---|---|
| Bissoli 90+1' (pen.) | Report | Léo Artur 10' |

Chang Arena, Buriram
Attendance: 14,852
Referee: Koki Nagamine (Japan)
3 December 2025
19:30 UTC+8

| Tampines Rovers (Singapore) | 3–2 | (Thailand) BG Pathum United |
|---|---|---|
| Higashikawa 45+3', 61', 78' | Report | Doi 7'; Raniel 27' |

Jalan Besar Stadium, Jalan Besar
Attendance: 1,009
Referee: Ahmed Al-Ali (Jordan)
3 December 2025
19:00 UTC+8

| Dynamic Herb Cebu (Philippines) | 1–1 | (Malaysia) Selangor |
|---|---|---|
| Andes 47' | Report | Willian Lira 54' |

Rizal Memorial Stadium, Manila
Attendance: 243
Referee: Tam Ping Wun (Hong Kong)

28 January 2026
19:30 UTC+8

| Tampines Rovers (Singapore) | 1–4 | (Thailand) Buriram United |
|---|---|---|
| Suparno 90+1' | Report | Suphanat 32'; Bissoli 52', 70'; Čaušić 88' |

Jalan Besar Stadium, Jalan Besar
Attendance: 908
Referee: Koji Takasaki (Japan)
28 January 2026
19:00 UTC+7

| BG Pathum United (Thailand) | 2–0 | (Philippines) Dynamic Herb Cebu |
|---|---|---|
| Kaman 56'; Ikhsan 78' | Report |

True BG Stadium, Pathum Thani
Attendance: 4,831
Referee: Qasim Al-Hatmi (Oman)
28 January 2026
21:00 UTC+8

| Selangor (Malaysia) | 2–0 | (Vietnam) Công An Hà Nội |
|---|---|---|
| Faisal 60', 69' | Report |

Petaling Jaya Stadium, Petaling Jaya
Attendance: 2,574
Referee: Kim Woo-sung (South Korea)

4 February 2026
19:30 UTC+7

| Buriram United (Thailand) | 6–0 | (Philippines) Dynamic Herb Cebu |
|---|---|---|
| Walsh 18'; Čaušić 31'; Schindler 34'; Phitiwat 38'; Nathakorn 64'; Suphanat 90+1' | Report |

Chang Arena, Buriram
Attendance: 13,781
Referee: Shen Yinhao (China)
4 February 2026
20:30 UTC+8

| Selangor (Malaysia) | 1–1 | (Thailand) BG Pathum United |
|---|---|---|
| Faisal 36' | Report | Ankrah 63' (o.g.) |

Petaling Jaya Stadium, Petaling Jaya
Attendance: 3,302
Referee: Sami Al-Ismail (Saudi Arabia)
4 February 2026
19:30 UTC+7

| Công An Hà Nội (Vietnam) | 6–1 | (Singapore) Tampines Rovers |
|---|---|---|
| Gomes 14'; Lê Văn Đô 28'; Phan Văn Đức 32'; Vitão 74'; Alan 83', 90' | Report | Buhagiar 12' |

Hàng Đẫy Stadium, Hanoi
Attendance: 4,169
Referee: Chae Sang-hyeop (South Korea)

=== Group B ===
| Pos | Team | Pld | W | D | L | GF | GA | GD | Pts | Qualification | NDI | JDT | PKR | BKU | LCS | SUN |
|---|---|---|---|---|---|---|---|---|---|---|---|---|---|---|---|---|
| 1 | (Vietnam) Nam Định | 5 | 4 | 1 | 0 | 13 | 3 | +10 | 13 | Advance to knockout stage | — | 1–1 | 2–1 | — | 3–0 | — |
| 2 | (Malaysia) Johor Darul Ta'zim | 5 | 3 | 2 | 0 | 13 | 4 | +9 | 11 | Advance to knockout stage | — | — | — | 4–0 | 3–1 | 3–0 |
| 3 | (Cambodia) Preah Khan Reach Svay Rieng | 5 | 2 | 2 | 1 | 9 | 5 | +4 | 8 | | — | 2–2 | — | 1–1 | — | — |
| 4 | (Thailand) Bangkok United | 5 | 1 | 2 | 2 | 6 | 12 | −6 | 5 | | 1–4 | — | — | — | 2–2 | 2–1 |
| 5 | (Singapore) Lion City Sailors | 5 | 1 | 1 | 3 | 6 | 12 | −6 | 4 | | — | — | 0–2 | — | — | 3–2 |
| 6 | (Myanmar) Shan United | 5 | 0 | 0 | 5 | 3 | 14 | −11 | 0 | | 0–3 | — | 0–3 | — | — | — |

Source: ASEAN United FC
Rules for classification: Tiebreakers
21 August 2025
17:30 UTC+8

| Johor Darul Ta'zim (Malaysia) | 3–1 | (Singapore) Lion City Sailors |
|---|---|---|
| Figueiredo 11' (pen.), 16'; Arif 90+2' | Report | Anuar 90+5' |

Sultan Ibrahim Stadium, Johor Bahru
Attendance: 13,143
Referee: Koji Takasaki (Japan)
21 August 2025
18:00 UTC+6:30

| Shan United (Myanmar) | 0–3 | (Cambodia) PKR Svay Rieng |
|---|---|---|
| | Report | Min Ratanak 11'; Patrick 45+5'; Peprah 53' |

Thuwunna Stadium, Yangon
Attendance: 285
Referee: Ko Hyung-jin (South Korea)

25 September 2025
17:30 UTC+8

| Johor Darul Ta'zim (Malaysia) | 4–0 | (Thailand) Bangkok United |
|---|---|---|
| Bergson 46', 73', 90+2'; Figueiredo 52' | Report |

Sultan Ibrahim Stadium, Johor Bahru
Attendance: 11,677
Referee: Kim Hee-gon (South Korea)
25 September 2025
19:30 UTC+7

| Nam Định (Vietnam) | 2–1 | (Cambodia) PKR Svay Rieng |
|---|---|---|
| Lâm Ti Phông 36', 40' | Report | Patrick 81' |

Thiên Trường Stadium, Ninh Bình
Attendance: 5,018
Referee: Kim Woo-sung (South Korea)

4 December 2025
19:00 UTC+7

| Bangkok United (Thailand) | 2–2 | (Singapore) Lion City Sailors |
|---|---|---|
| Jakkaphan 24'; Kunori 76' | Report | Lestienne 11'; Lopes 20' |

True BG Stadium, Pathum Thani
Attendance: 769
Referee: Meder Tayçiev (Kyrgyzstan)
4 December 2025
19:00 UTC+7

| PKR Svay Rieng (Cambodia) | 2–2 | (Malaysia) Johor Darul Ta'zim |
|---|---|---|
| Cristian 29'; Nhean Sosidan 37' | Report | Lowry 90+2'; Corbin-Ong 90+6' |

Morodok Techo National Stadium, Phnom Penh
Attendance: 16,782
Referee: Kim Woo-sung (South Korea)
4 December 2025
18:00 UTC+6:30

| Shan United (Myanmar) | 0–3 | (Vietnam) Nam Định |
|---|---|---|
| | Report | Nguyễn Xuân Son 45+2' (pen.), 51', 87' |

Thuwunna Stadium, Yangon
Attendance: 135
Referee: Firdavs Nosafarov (Uzbekistan)

17 December 2025
19:00 UTC+7

| Bangkok United (Thailand) | 1–4 | (Vietnam) Nam Định |
|---|---|---|
| Wisarut 85' | Report | Alves 44'; Nguyễn Xuân Son 49', 90+6'; Trần Ngọc Sơn 59' |

True BG Stadium, Pathum Thani
Attendance: 553
Referee: Yahya Al-Balushi (Oman)
17 December 2025
19:30 UTC+8

| Lion City Sailors (Singapore) | 3–2 | (Myanmar) Shan United |
|---|---|---|
| L. Thy 23', 68'; Lestienne 45+3' | Report | M. Souza 28' (pen.); Hirota 66' |

Jalan Besar Stadium, Jalan Besar
Attendance: 1,543
Referee: Yusuke Ohashi (Japan)

29 January 2026
17:30 UTC+8

| Johor Darul Ta'zim (Malaysia) | 3–0 | (Myanmar) Shan United |
|---|---|---|
| Arribas 65'; Bergson 67', 71' | Report |

Sultan Ibrahim Stadium, Johor Bahru
Attendance: 9,993
Referee: Rustam Lutfullin (Uzbekistan)
29 January 2026
19:30 UTC+7

| Nam Định (Vietnam) | 3–0 | (Singapore) Lion City Sailors |
|---|---|---|
| Caio 35'; Nguyễn Xuân Son 61', 90+3' | Report |

Thiên Trường Stadium, Ninh Bình
Attendance: 3,918
Referee: Mohammed Al-Shammari (Qatar)

5 February 2026
19:30 UTC+7

| Bangkok United (Thailand) | 2–1 | (Myanmar) Shan United |
|---|---|---|
| Rungrath 24'; Nanda Kyaw 69' (o.g.) | Report | Myat Kaung Khant 7' |

True BG Stadium, Pathum Thani
Attendance: 528
Referee: Faisal Al-Balawi (Saudi Arabia)
5 February 2026
19:30 UTC+7

| Nam Định (Vietnam) | 1–1 | (Malaysia) Johor Darul Ta'zim |
|---|---|---|
| Nguyễn Văn Vĩ 33' | Report | Bergson 87' (pen.) |

Thiên Trường Stadium, Ninh Bình
Attendance: 3,335
Referee: Hiroki Kasahara (Japan)
5 February 2026
20:30 UTC+8

| Lion City Sailors (Singapore) | 0–2 | (Cambodia) PKR Svay Rieng |
|---|---|---|
| | Report | Patrick 51', 64' |

Jalan Besar Stadium, Jalan Besar
Attendance: 895
Referee: Kim Hee-gon (South Korea)

22 April 2026
18:30 UTC+7

| PKR Svay Rieng (Cambodia) | 1–1 | (Thailand) Bangkok United |
|---|---|---|
| Sareth Krya 45+1' | Report | Rungrath 16' |

Hàng Đẫy Stadium, Hanoi (Vietnam)
Attendance: 806
Referee: Koji Takasaki (Japan)
