= Faisal Halim =

Malaysian footballer (born 1998)

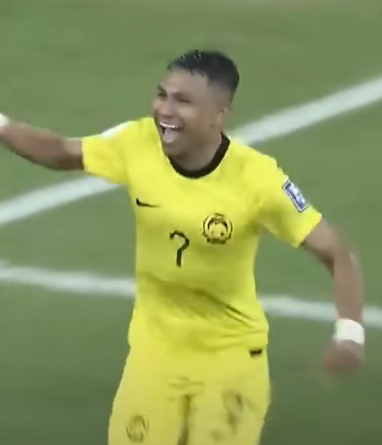
- Faisal with Malaysia in 2023

Personal information
- Full name: Muhammad Faisal bin Abdul Halim
- Date of birth: 7 January 1998 (age 28)
- Place of birth: Mengkuang Titi, Penang, Malaysia
- Height: 1.58 m (5 ft 2 in)
- Positions: Winger; striker

Team information
- Current team: Selangor
- Number: 7

Youth career
- 2012–2015: Penang

Senior career*
Years	Team	Apps	(Gls)
2015	Penang	0	(0)
2016–2020	Sri Pahang	60	(6)
2021–2022	Terengganu	42	(10)
2023–	Selangor	60	(22)

International career^{‡}
2016–2018	Malaysia U19	8	(0)
2018–2021	Malaysia U23	4	(1)
2019–	Malaysia	43	(18)
Medal record
Men's football
Representing Malaysia
FIFA ASEAN Cup
Third place	2026 Indonesia
Merdeka Tournament
Runner-up	2023
King's Cup
Runner-up	2022
- * Club domestic league appearances and goals as of 7 June 2026 ‡ National team caps and goals as of 6 October 2026

Muhammad Faisal bin Abdul Halim (born 7 January 1998), better known as Faisal or by his nickname Mickey, is a Malaysian professional footballer who plays as a winger or striker for Malaysia Super League club Selangor F.C., which he captains, and the Malaysia national team.

Faisal was born in Mengkuang Titi, Penang, where he began his career playing for his home state team Penang at the age of 17 in 2015. The following year, Faisal made a big decision to move from his state of birth and spread his wings with Pahang's first team in 2016. Faisal spent five years at the club, and won his first major honour as a player as the club won the 2018 Malaysia FA Cup. His attacking performances earned him a move to an east coast club, Terengganu, where he later became a key member of the club. In the 2022 season, he helped Terengganu to achieve second place in the league table, also helped them to qualify for the 2023 AFC Cup tournament. After a successful two seasons with Terengganu, he signed for Selangor on a two-year contract.

At international level, Faisal has represented Malaysia at senior level since 2019, and was a member of the nation's squads at the 2020, 2022 AFF Championship and 2023 AFC Asian Cup.

== Club career ==
=== Penang ===
Faisal started his professional career with Malaysia Premier League club, Penang as a 17-years old in the 2015 season. He made his debut and scored one goal in the Malaysia Cup tournament against PDRM on 17 October 2015 where Penang lost 2–3.

He was one of the young players who were called up to play with Penang's senior team squad in preparation for the 2015 Malaysia Cup. His performance in the Malaysia President Cup competition brought him to the attention of Penang's management. He left Penang after the end of the season after making 3 appearances and scoring 1 goal.

=== Pahang ===
In November 2015, Faisal signed a contract with Pahang. He made his first league appearance for the club in a 2–2 draw against T–Team. He scored his first goal for the club in an 1–3 defeat over Selangor on 27 February 2016. He was one of the key players who helped Tok Gajah lift the FA Cup in 2018. Faisal left the club after his contract expired on 31 November 2020. He made 60 appearances, scoring nine goals and notching four assists in his five-year stint with the team.

=== Terengganu ===
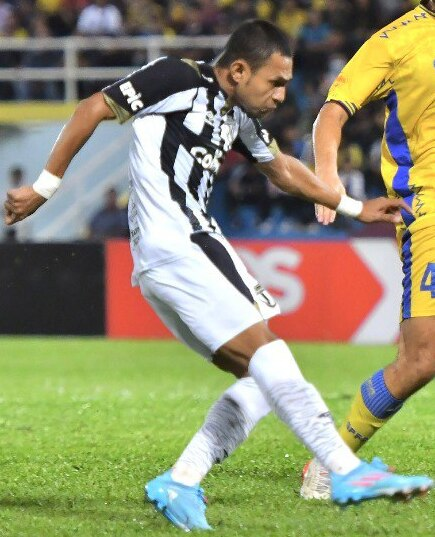
Faisal with Terengganu in 2022.

On the 6 December 2020, Faisal signed a contract with Terengganu on a two-year deal and was given the number 7 for the 2021 season. Faisal made his debut for the club on 6 March 2021 in a 2–1 win against UiTM at UiTM Stadium. He scored his first goal 14 March 2021 against Perak in a 2–0 win at the Perak Stadium. On 23 November 2022, Faisal announced that he would leave Terengganu at the end of the 2022 season. He played his last game in the Terengganu shirt, in a disappointing 3–2 defeat on aggregate to Selangor in the Malaysia Cup semi-finals.

Following his two seasons with the club, Faisal emerged as one of the Malaysian league's finest wingers. In two season's, Faisal played on 42 league games, registering 21 goals in all competitions with the turtles.

=== Selangor ===
On 22 December 2022, Selangor announced the signing of Faisal on a free transfer. He made his debut for the club on 26 February 2023 in the opening 2023 Super League match against Kelantan United, which ended in a 1–0 victory. Faisal scored his first goal for the club on 31 March against Kuala Lumpur City through a penalty as Selangor won the game 3–1. On 25 August 2023, Faisal scored his first brace in Selangor's Super League record 2–11 away win against Kelantan. Faisal participated in a large successful season at Selangor, who finished in second place in Super League that season. Throughout the season, he made 28 appearances, scoring twelve goals and providing eleven assists.

In middle 2024, Faisal was unable to play due to become victim of criminal activity and suffered fourth-degree burns after being attacked with acid. Close to three months after his incident, Faisal began individual training at club facilities in preparation for a possible comeback to football. On 3 August 2024, Faisal was included in the squad in the FA Cup semi-final match against Terengganu, despite not being substituted or included in the starting lineup. A week later, Faisal return to played competitive football for the first time after 97 days since suffering from the incident, returning as a substitute in Selangor's clash with Kelantan Darul Naim in the league match, replaced Reziq Bani Hani in the 87th-minute. Faisal recorded his first goal of the season and scored a hat-trick in a 7–0 win over Kelantan Darul Naim on 8 March 2025.

In July 2025, as Selangor loans out their club captain Safuwan Baharuddin, Faisal was selected to be the club captain ahead of the 2025–26 season.

== International career ==
=== Senior ===
On 2 June 2019, Faisal made his senior international debut against Nepal in a friendly match. In December 2021, Faisal was named in Malaysia's 24-man squad for the 2020 AFF Championship in Singapore. He participated in one match, in a 1–4 defeat against Indonesia in the last match of the group stage. He scored his first international goal on 27 May 2022 in a friendly match against Brunei. In November 2022, he was selected in the Malaysia squad for the 2022 AFF Championship. On 21 December 2022, Faisal started his first match against Myanmar in which he score the winning goal in the first match of the group stage as the Malaysia won 1–0 at Thuwunna Stadium. In Malaysia's second group stage match, Faisal scored two goals in a 5–0 win over Laos. In the semi-final against Thailand, Faisal struck his fourth goal of the tournament, despite the national squad had been defeated by 1–3 on aggregate. On 27 January 2023, Faisal was named on the best starting eleven-man for 2022 AFF Championship All-Star XI award for the tournament's best player.

Faisal is also part of the Malaysia team that qualified for the 2023 AFC Asian Cup and scored 1 goal against Turkmenistan to win 3–1 in 2023 AFC Asian Cup qualification third round. Faisal was part of Malaysia's squad for the 2023 Merdeka Tournament. He scored once in a 4–2 win over India at the semi-final stage. On 16 November 2023 during the 2026 FIFA World Cup qualification match, Faisal scored a late decisive stoppage time winner against Kyrgyzstan which Malaysia overturned a 3–1 deficit to a 4–3 comeback win. On 26 December 2023, Faisal was included in Malaysia's squad for 2023 AFC Asian Cup by head coach Kim Pan-gon. During the group stage, he played all three matches and scored a goal against South Korea, despite Malaysia already being mathematically eliminated from the tournament. Faisal was included in the 'Team of the Matchday 3' and also had been nominated for the Goal of the Tournament. His goal against South Korea was eventually voted 'Goal of the Tournament'.

== Player profile ==
=== Style of play ===
Faisal is a fast, skillful and diminutive right footed winger, who is usually deployed on the left in a 4–3–3 or in a 4–2–3–1 formation. Although his preferred role is on the left flank, he is can play in any offensive position on either side of the pitch, as well as the centre; he is also known for his defensive contributions, despite his lack of physicality, and ability to cover a lot of ground.

He has often operated in deeper, more creative positions, either in a free role in the centre as an attacking midfield playmaker behind the strikers, or as a supporting forward, due to his passing ability, which enable him to link-up with midfielders, create chances, and provide assists for teammates. He is also capable of playing in a more offensive central role as a false 9. Faisal's resulting low centre of gravity, combined with his creativity, quick feet and technical ability, make him extremely quick and agile in possession, and give him excellent balance and control of the ball, which, along with his flair, intelligent movement, speed, and dribbling skills, allows him to beat opponents and create space for his team in attacking areas, or make attacking runs off the ball into the box. He's regarded as one of Malaysia's most promising prospects in his youth.

=== Goal celebration ===
Faisal is nationally known for his multiple celebrations made in reference to his footballing idol Cristiano Ronaldo, whenever he scored a goal.

== Controversies ==
=== Offensive remarks ===
On 26 July 2023, Faisal was handed a four-month suspension by the Football Association of Malaysia (FAM), due to comments made to the media by the player after the Super League match against Sabah on 27 April 2023. He said in an interview that the match against Sabah 'could have been fairer'. Faisal was brought before the Disciplinary Committee after being found to have violated Article 61 of the FAM Disciplinary Code (press statements) and Article 82 of the FAM Statute (contributions to the media) through the statement he issued on 27 April 2023. According to the decision, Faisal was actually suspended for four months from 25 July 2023 to 21 November 2023. However, Faisal was only suspended for one month, from 25 July to 23 August 2023, of which the next three-month suspension will be carried out subject to good behavior for 12 months starting on 24 August 2023.

=== Acid attack ===
On 5 May 2024, Faisal suffered an acid attack in front of a shopping mall. This incident occurred after his national teammate Akhyar Rashid was assaulted and robbed a few days prior. It was later confirmed that Faisal suffered fourth-degree burns and had to undergo multiple surgeries. As of 8 May 2024, the suspect remains at large. According to some witnesses, the suspect managed to say "Good luck" to Faisal before splashing the acid. As a result of the attack, Selangor, who was supposed to face 2023 Malaysia Super League champions Johor Darul Ta'zim at the 2024 season opening Piala Sumbangsih, withdrew from the match over safety concerns.

On 22 June 2024, Faisal received a surprise visit from former prime minister Mahathir Mohamad at his residence in Shah Alam.

== Personal life ==
Faisal married Nur Syazwani Mizuana Shahril on 9 March 2019. They have one child, Khalish Aryan Faisal. Faisal and his wife were divorced for the second time on 10 November 2025, with the first divorce having occurred on 11 June.

== Career statistics ==
=== Club ===
As of 27 May 2026

Appearances and goals by club, season and competition
Club	Season	League			Cup (Note: Appearances in Malaysia FA Cup)		League Cup (Note: Appearances in Malaysia Cup)		Continental		Other		Total	
Club	Season	Division	Apps	Goals	Apps	Goals	Apps	Goals	Apps	Goals	Apps	Goals	Apps	Goals
Penang	2015	Malaysia Premier League	–		–		3	1	–				3	1
Penang	Total		–		–		3	1	–				3	1
Sri Pahang	2016	Malaysia Super League	10	1	2	0	1	1	–				13	2
Sri Pahang	2017	Malaysia Super League	5	0	0	0	2	0	–				7	0
Sri Pahang	2018	Malaysia Super League	17	2	5	0	1	0	–				23	2
Sri Pahang	2019	Malaysia Super League	17	1	5	2	7	0	–				29	3
Sri Pahang	2020	Malaysia Super League	11	2	0	0	1	0	–				12	2
Sri Pahang	Total		60	6	12	2	12	1	–				84	9
Terengganu	2021	Malaysia Super League	22	4	–		9	6	–				31	10
Terengganu	2022	Malaysia Super League	20	6	5	3	6	2	–				31	11
Terengganu	Total		42	10	5	3	15	8	–				62	21
Selangor	2023	Malaysia Super League	23	11	3	1	2	0	–				28	12
Selangor	2024–25	Malaysia Super League	13	3	0	0	2	0	4 (Note: Appearances in AFC Champions League Two)	0	5 (Note: Appearance(s) in MFL Challenge Cup)	0	24	3
Selangor	2025–26	Malaysia Super League	23	6	6	7	6	4	4	1	9 (Note: Appearance(s) in ASEAN Club Championship)	4	48	22
Selangor	Total		59	20	9	8	10	4	8	1	14	4	100	37
Career total			161	36	26	13	40	14	8	1	14	4	249	68

=== International ===
As of 6 October 2026

Appearances and goals by national team and year
National team	Year	Apps	Goals
Malaysia	2019	1	0
Malaysia	2020	0	0
Malaysia	2021	3	0
Malaysia	2022	12	8
Malaysia	2023	13	6
Malaysia	2024	5	1
Malaysia	2025	6	3
Malaysia	2026	3	0
Total		43	18

=== International goals ===
==== Senior ====
No.	Date	Venue	Opponent	Score	Result	Competition
1.	27 May 2022	Bukit Jalil National Stadium, Kuala Lumpur, Malaysia	Brunei	3–0	4–0	Friendly
2.	8 June 2022	Bukit Jalil National Stadium, Kuala Lumpur, Malaysia	Turkmenistan	2–0	3–1	2023 AFC Asian Cup qualification
3.	9 December 2022	Bukit Jalil National Stadium, Kuala Lumpur, Malaysia	Cambodia	1–0	4–0	Friendly
4.	9 December 2022	Bukit Jalil National Stadium, Kuala Lumpur, Malaysia	Cambodia	3–0	4–0	Friendly
5.	14 December 2022	Kuala Lumpur Stadium, Kuala Lumpur, Malaysia	Maldives	2–0	3–0	Friendly
6.	21 December 2022	Thuwunna Stadium, Yangon, Myanmar	Myanmar	1–0	1–0	2022 AFF Championship
7.	24 December 2022	Bukit Jalil National Stadium, Kuala Lumpur, Malaysia	Laos	2–0	5–0	2022 AFF Championship
8.	24 December 2022	Bukit Jalil National Stadium, Kuala Lumpur, Malaysia	Laos	3–0	5–0	2022 AFF Championship
9.	7 January 2023	Bukit Jalil National Stadium, Kuala Lumpur, Malaysia	Thailand	1–0	1–0	2022 AFF Championship
10.	28 March 2023	Sultan Ibrahim Stadium, Johor, Malaysia	Hong Kong	2–0	2–0	Friendly
11.	20 June 2023	Sultan Mizan Zainal Abidin Stadium, Terengganu, Malaysia	Papua New Guinea	4–0	10–0	Friendly
12.	9 September 2023	Phoenix Hill Football Stadium, Chengdu, China	China	1–0	1–1	Friendly
13.	13 October 2023	Bukit Jalil National Stadium, Kuala Lumpur, Malaysia	India	3–1	4–2	2023 Merdeka Tournament
14.	16 November 2023	Bukit Jalil National Stadium, Kuala Lumpur, Malaysia	Kyrgyzstan	4–3	4–3	2026 FIFA World Cup qualification
15.	25 January 2024	Al Janoub Stadium, Al Wakrah, Qatar	South Korea	1–1	3–3	2023 AFC Asian Cup
16.	9 October 2025	New Laos National Stadium, Vientiane, Laos	Laos	3–0	3–0	2027 AFC Asian Cup qualification
17.	14 October 2025	Bukit Jalil National Stadium, Kuala Lumpur, Malaysia	Laos	1–1	5–1	2027 AFC Asian Cup qualification
18.	18 November 2025	Bukit Jalil National Stadium, Kuala Lumpur, Malaysia	Nepal	1–0	1–0	2027 AFC Asian Cup qualification

== Honours ==
Penang

- Malaysia President Cup runner-up: 2015

Pahang

- Malaysia FA Cup: 2018

Terengganu

- Malaysia Super League runner-up: 2022
- Malaysia FA Cup runner-up: 2022

Selangor

- Malaysia Super League runner-up: 2023
- MFL Challenge Cup: 2024–25
- ASEAN Club Championship runner-up: 2025–26

Malaysia

- King's Cup runner-up: 2022
- Pestabola Merdeka runner-up: 2023

Individual

- Malaysia Super League Team of the Season: 2022, 2024–25
- Liga M Awards – Best Striker: 2025–2026
- AFF Championship Best XI: 2022
- ASEAN Club Championship: Allstar XI 2025–26
- AFC Asian Cup Goal of the Tournament: 2023

=== Order ===
- Selangor
  - Member of the Order of Sultan Sharafuddin Idris Shah (AIS) (2024)
