= 2023 Merdeka Tournament =

International football competition

Pesta Bola Merdeka

Tournament details
- Host country: Malaysia
- Dates: 13–17 October 2023
- Teams: 3 (from 1 confederation)
- Venue: 1 (in 1 host city)

Final positions
- Champions: Tajikistan (1st title)
- Runners-up: Malaysia
- Third place: India

Tournament statistics
- Matches played: 2
- Goals scored: 8 (4 per match)
- Attendance: 82,708 (41,354 per match)

The 2023 Merdeka Tournament was the 42nd edition of the tournament which was organised by the Football Association of Malaysia. The tournament, which featured three participants, took place between 13 and 17 October.

Tajikistan emerged as the champion of the tournament for their first title after beating host Malaysia 2–0 at the final.

== Participating nations ==
The teams were announced by the Football Association of Malaysia (FAM) in March 2023. The draw took place on 8 August 2023. Lebanon later withdrew from the tournament because the 2026 World Cup qualification draw placed them in the same group as Palestine. Tajikistan was then selected to replace Lebanon.

Due to Gaza war, Palestine decided to withdraw three days prior to the tournament.

The following are the FIFA Rankings of the participating national teams, as of 21 September 2023.

- Palestine (97) (withdrew)
- Lebanon (101) (withdrew)
- India (102)
- Tajikistan (110)
- Malaysia (134)

== Venue ==
All matches were played at the Bukit Jalil National Stadium in Kuala Lumpur, Malaysia.

Kuala Lumpur
Bukit Jalil National Stadium
Capacity: 87,411
| 2023 Merdeka Tournament is located in Malaysia |

== Matches ==
=== Match rule ===
- 90 minutes.
- Penalty shoot-out after a draw in 90 minutes.
- Maximum of five substitutions.

=== Bracket ===
Semi-finals
13 October – Bukit Jalil National Stadium
Malaysia | 4
India | 2
13 October – Bukit Jalil National Stadium
Palestine
Tajikistan | w/o

Final
17 October – Bukit Jalil National Stadium
Malaysia | 0
Tajikistan | 2

=== Semi-finals ===
13 October 2023
21:00

| Malaysia | 4–2 | India |
|---|---|---|
| Cools 7'; Arif 20' (pen.); Faisal 42'; Corbin-Ong 61' | Report (Olympics.com); Report (FAM) | Mahesh 13'; Chhetri 51' |

Bukit Jalil National Stadium, Kuala Lumpur
Attendance: 46,150
Referee: Mongkolchai Pechsri (Thailand)

=== Final ===
17 October 2023
21:00

| Malaysia | 0–2 | Tajikistan |
|---|---|---|
| | Report (TheStar); Report (FAM) | Soirov 44'; Samiev 88' |

Bukit Jalil National Stadium, Kuala Lumpur
Attendance: 36,558
Referee: Hoàng Ngọc Hà (Vietnam)

== Winners ==
2023 Merdeka Tournament Winner
(Tajikistan)
Tajikistan
1st title

== Goalscorers ==
There were 8 goals scored in 2 matches, for an average of 4 goals per match.

1 goal

- (India) Sunil Chhetri
- (India) Naorem Mahesh Singh
- (Malaysia) Arif Aiman Hanapi
- (Malaysia) Dion Cools
- (Malaysia) La'Vere Corbin-Ong
- (Malaysia) Faisal Halim
- (Tajikistan) Shahrom Samiev
- (Tajikistan) Rustam Soirov
