= Sandy Walsh =

Indonesian footballer (born 1995)

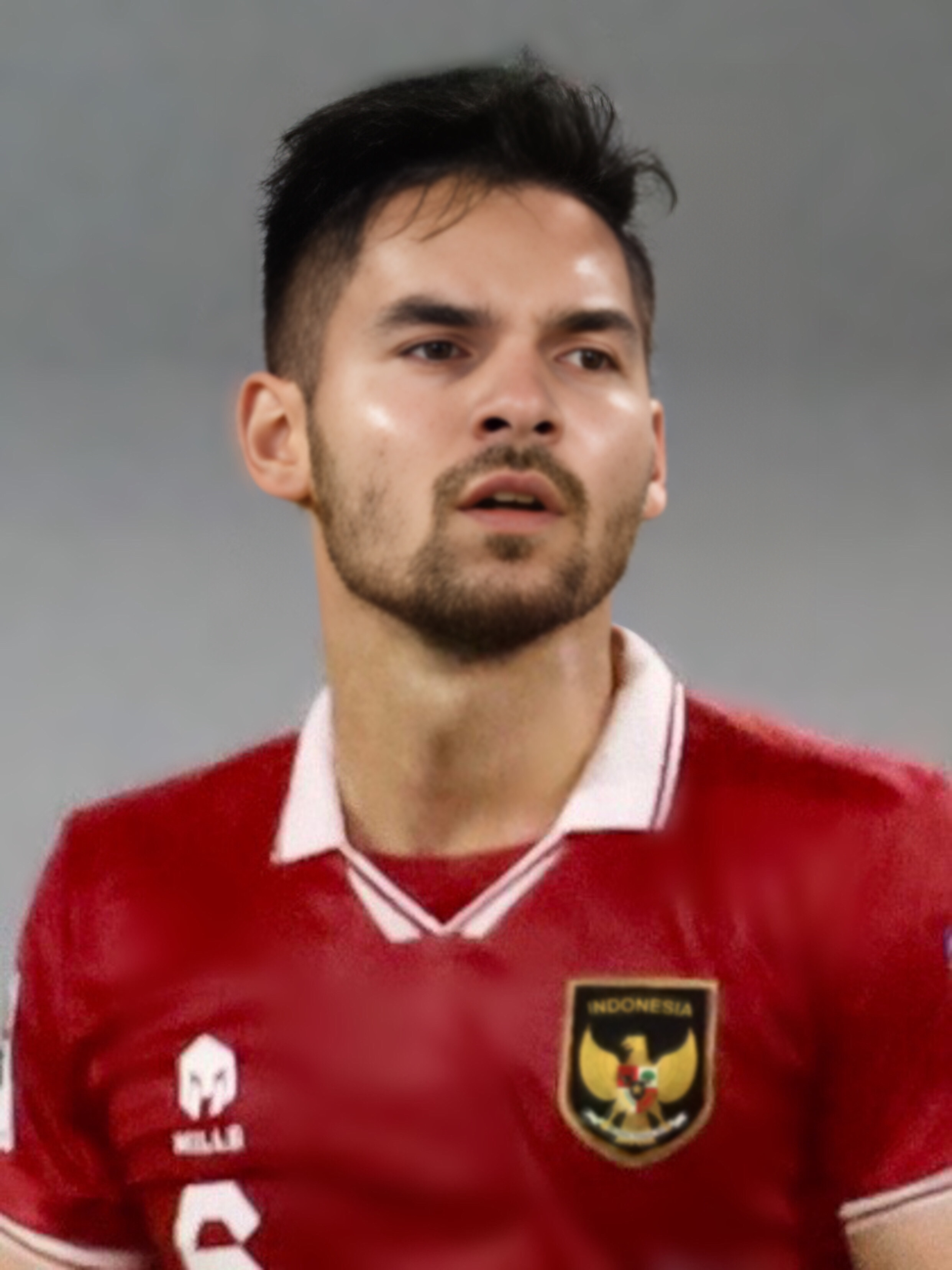
- Walsh playing for Indonesia in 2023

Personal information
- Full name: Sandy Henny Walsh
- Date of birth: 14 March 1995 (age 31)
- Place of birth: Brussels, Belgium
- Height: 1.83 m (6 ft 0 in)
- Positions: Right-back; centre-back

Team information
- Current team: Persib Bandung
- Number: 6

Youth career
- 2001–2002: Tempo Overijse
- 2002–2003: ERC Hoeilaart
- 2003–2011: Anderlecht
- 2011–2012: Genk

Senior career*
Years	Team	Apps	(Gls)
2012–2017	Genk	51	(1)
2017–2020	Zulte Waregem	48	(2)
2020–2025	Mechelen	125	(8)
2025	Yokohama F. Marinos	8	(0)
2025–2026	Buriram United	20	(2)
2026–	Persib Bandung	4	(0)

International career^{‡}
2009–2012	Netherlands U17	18	(1)
2012–2014	Netherlands U19	10	(0)
2023–	Indonesia	26	(4)
Medal record
Men's football
Representing Indonesia
FIFA Series
Runner-up	2026 Indonesia
Representing Netherlands
UEFA European Under-17 Championship
Winner	2012 Slovenia
- * Club domestic league appearances and goals as of 1 November 2026 ‡ National team caps and goals as of 31 July 2026

Sandy Henny Walsh (born 14 March 1995) is a professional footballer who plays as a defender for Indonesian Super League club Persib Bandung. Born in Belgium and a former Netherlands youth international, he represents the Indonesia national team.

== Club career ==
=== Youth career ===
Walsh spent time in the youth sides of Tempo Overijse and ERC Hoeilaart before joining Anderlecht in 2003 where he stayed until 2011 when he joined Genk.

=== Genk ===
On 2 September 2012, he made his professional debut for Genk, coming on as a substitute for the final moments of a 2–2 draw with his former side Anderlecht in the Belgian Pro League.

=== Zulte Waregem ===
Walsh moved to Zulte Waregem in the summer of 2017, making his league debut on 5 August 2017 as a substitute in a 2–0 win over Sint-Truiden.

=== Mechelen ===
In October 2020, he moved to another Belgian club Mechelen. He made his league debut on 1 November 2020 as a starter in a 2–2 draw with Club Brugge. He scored the only goal in the quarter-final of the Belgian Cup in injury time against Kortijk, sending Mechelen to the semi-finals.

=== Yokohama F. Marinos ===
On 9 February 2025, J1 League club Yokohama F. Marinos announced the signing of Walsh. He made his debut on 19 February 2025 as a starter in a match AFC Champions League Elite against Shanghai Port.

=== Buriram United ===
On 19 August 2025, Buriram United officially introduced Walsh as their new player.

=== Persib Bandung ===
On 2 July 2026, Persib Bandung announced the recruitment of Walsh with a 3-year contract period. Walsh then chose the number 6 as his squad number, which was previously used by Robi Darwis within the same club.

== International career ==
=== Netherlands ===
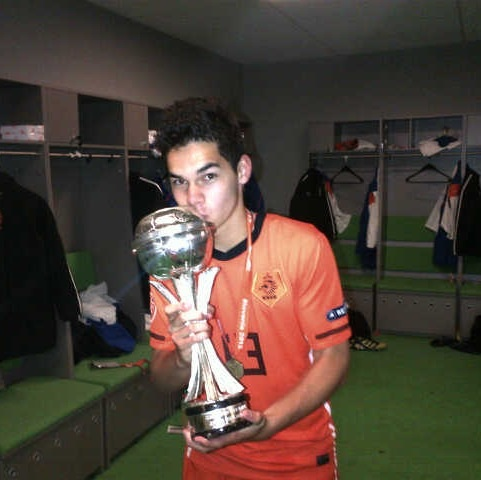
Walsh with Netherlands U17 after winning the 2012 Euro Under-17 Championship

Walsh has represented the Netherlands at youth international and won the UEFA European Under-17 Championship with the under-17 side in 2012. He has represented the Netherlands at every level from under-15 to under-20.

=== Indonesia ===
In May 2022, Walsh confirmed that he had decided to represent Indonesia at international level. On 22 November 2022, Walsh received a call-up from Indonesia national team coach Shin Tae-Yong for a training camp in preparation for the 2022 AFF Championship. He was however called back by his club.

On 27 May 2023, Walsh received call-up to the Indonesia national team for friendly matches against Palestine and Argentina. However, Walsh was unable to play in both matches, as he got a calf injury during training.

On 29 August 2023, Walsh received another call-up to the national team for the friendly match against Turkmenistan. He went on to make his debut against said team in a 2–0 win.

On 24 January 2024, Walsh scored his debut goal in injury-time for the national team in a 1–3 loss against Japan in the final match of the 2023 AFC Asian Cup group stage.

On 5 September 2024, in the first match of the third round of 2026 FIFA World Cup qualification, Walsh scored a goal against Saudi Arabia through a deflection from his teammate Ragnar Oratmangoen in a 1–1 draw.

== Personal life ==
Walsh was born in Belgium to an Irish father who was born in England, and an Indonesian mother who was born in Switzerland and raised in Netherlands. He was therefore eligible for either Belgium, England, Ireland, Switzerland, Netherlands, or Indonesia.

On 17 November 2022, Walsh officially obtained Indonesian citizenship.

On 15 August 2024, Walsh married Canada national basketball team player Aislinn Konig in Spain.

== Career statistics ==
=== Club ===
As of match played 1 November 2026

Appearances and goals by club, season and competition
Club	Season	League			National cup (Note: Includes Belgian Cup, Emperor's Cup, Thai FA Cup)		League cup		Continental		Other		Total	
Club	Season	Division	Apps	Goals	Apps	Goals	Apps	Goals	Apps	Goals	Apps	Goals	Apps	Goals
Genk	2011–12	Belgian Pro League	0	0	0	0	–		0	0	0	0	0	0
Genk	2012–13	Belgian Pro League	1	0	1	0	–		0	0	0	0	2	0
Genk	2013–14	Belgian Pro League	4	0	1	0	–		1 (Note: Appearances in the UEFA Europa League)	0	0	0	6	0
Genk	2014–15	Belgian Pro League	11	0	0	0	–		0	0	0	0	11	0
Genk	2015–16	Belgian Pro League	23	1	5	0	–		0	0	0	0	28	1
Genk	2016–17	Belgian Pro League	12	0	2	0	–		9	0	5 (Note: Appearances in the First Division A 'Europa League' play-offs)	1	28	1
Genk	Total		51	1	9	0	–		10	0	5	1	75	2
Zulte Waregem	2017–18	Belgian Pro League	18	1	2	0	–		4	0	10	0	34	1
Zulte Waregem	2018–19	Belgian Pro League	21	1	2	0	–		–		10	1	33	2
Zulte Waregem	2019–20	Belgian Pro League	9	0	4	0	–		–		0	0	13	0
Zulte Waregem	Total		48	2	8	0	–		4	0	20	1	80	3
Mechelen	2020–21	Belgian Pro League	30	3	1	0	–		–		–		31	3
Mechelen	2021–22	Belgian Pro League	33	3	1	0	–		–		–		34	3
Mechelen	2022–23	Belgian Pro League	25	2	5	1	–		–		–		30	3
Mechelen	2023–24	Belgian Pro League	31	0	0	0	–		–		–		31	0
Mechelen	2024–25	Belgian Pro League	6	0	1	0	–		–		–		7	0
Mechelen	Total		125	8	8	1	–		–		–		133	9
Yokohama F. Marinos	2025	J1 League	8	0	1	0	0	0	3 (Note: Appearances in the AFC Champions League Elite)	0	0	0	12	0
Buriram United	2025–26	Thai League 1	20	2	2	2	3 (Note: Appearances in Thai League Cup)	0	8	0	2 (Note: Appearances in ASEAN Club Championship)	1	35	5
Persib Bandung	2026–27	Super League	4	0	0	0	0	0	2 (Note: Appearances in AFC Champions League Two)	0	0	0	6	0
Career total			256	13	28	3	3	0	27	0	27	3	341	19

=== International ===
As of match played 31 July 2026

Appearances and goals by national team and year
National team	Year	Apps	Goals
Indonesia	2023	4	0
Indonesia	2024	14	2
Indonesia	2025	4	1
Indonesia	2026	4	1
Total		26	4

As of match played 27 July 2026
Scores and results list Indonesia's goal tally first, score column indicates score after each Walsh goal.

List of international goals scored by Sandy Walsh
No.	Date	Venue	Cap	Opponent	Score	Result	Competition
1	24 January 2024	Al Thumama Stadium, Doha, Qatar	8	Japan	1–3	1–3	2023 AFC Asian Cup
2	5 September 2024	King Abdullah Sports City, Jeddah, Saudi Arabia	14	Saudi Arabia	1–0	1–1	2026 FIFA World Cup qualification
3	5 September 2025	Gelora Bung Tomo Stadium, Surabaya, Indonesia	21	Chinese Taipei	6–0	6–0	Friendly
4	27 July 2026	Pakansari Stadium, Bogor, Indonesia	25	Cambodia	3–0	5–1	2026 ASEAN Championship

== Honours ==
Genk

- Belgian Cup: 2012–13
- Belgian Super Cup: 2011–12

Buriram United

- Thai League 1: 2025–26
- ASEAN Club Championship: 2025–26
- Thai FA Cup: 2025–26

Netherlands U-17

- UEFA European Under-17 Championship: 2012

Indonesia

- FIFA Series runner-up: 2026

== See also ==
- List of Indonesia international footballers born outside Indonesia
