= 2025–26 ASEAN Club Championship qualifying play-off round =

Southeast Asian football tournament

2025–26 ASEAN Club Championship qualifying play-off round was the play-off round of the 2025–26 ASEAN Club Championship, prior to the competition proper. It began on 8 August and ended on 15 August 2025.

A total of 4 teams competed in the qualifying play-off round. The two winners in the play-off round advanced to the group stage, to join the 10 teams that entered the group stage.

== Format ==
Each tie was played over two legs, with each team playing one leg at home. The team that scores more goals on aggregate over the two legs advances to the next round. If the aggregate score is level at the end of normal time of the second leg, extra time will be played, and if the same number of goals is scored by both teams during extra time, the tie will be determined by a penalty shoot-out.

== Schedule ==
The schedule of the competition is as follows.

Schedule for 2025–26 ASEAN Club Championship qualifying play-off round
Draw date	First leg	Second leg
4 July 2025	8 and 9 August 2025	15 August 2025

== Teams ==
Below were the participating teams grouped by their starting play-off round.

Key to colours
Winners of the play-off round advanced to the group stage

Play-off round
No.	Team
1	(Philippines) Dynamic Herb Cebu
2	(Myanmar) Shan United
3	(Laos) Ezra
4	(Brunei) Kasuka

== Play-off round ==
The draw for the play-off round was held on 4 July 2025.

Pot 1	Pot 2
(Philippines) Dynamic Herb Cebu; (Myanmar) Shan United	(Laos) Ezra; (Brunei) Kasuka

=== Summary ===
The first leg was played on 8 and 9 August, and the second leg on 15 August 2025. The winners of the ties advanced to the group stage.

Play-off round
Team 1	Agg.	Team 2	1st leg	2nd leg
Kasuka (Brunei)	2–4	(Philippines) DH Cebu	2–1	0–3
Ezra (Laos)	1–3	(Myanmar) Shan United	1–2	0–1

8 August 2025
20:15 UTC+8

Kasuka (Brunei)	2–1	(Philippines) DH Cebu
Njoku 17', 31'	Report	Andes 27'

Hassanal Bolkiah National Stadium, Bandar Seri Begawan
Attendance: 2,350
Referee: Zakaria Ismail (Malaysia)
15 August 2025
19:00 UTC+8

DH Cebu (Philippines)	3–0	(Brunei) Kasuka
Andes 26', 78'; Paulos 20'	Report

Rizal Memorial Stadium, Manila
Attendance: 885
Referee: Ahmad A'Qashah (Singapore)

Dynamic Herb Cebu won 4–2 on aggregate.

9 August 2025
19:00 UTC+7

Ezra (Laos)	1–2	(Myanmar) Shan United
Anantaza 63' (pen.)	Report	Rintaro 52'; Khun Kyaw Zin Hein 82' (pen.)

Chonburi Stadium, Chonburi (Thailand) (Note: Ezra played their home match at Chonburi Stadium, Chonburi (Thailand), due to the New Laos National Stadium in Vientiane already hosting the 2026 AFC U-20 Women's Asian Cup qualification tournament.)
Attendance: 347
Referee: Hoàng Ngọc Hà (Vietnam)
15 August 2025
18:00 UTC+6:30

Shan United (Myanmar)	1–0	(Laos) Ezra
Ye Yint Aung 45+4' (pen.)	Report

Thuwunna Stadium, Yangon
Attendance: 650
Referee: Mongkolchai Pechsri (Thailand)

Shan United won 3–1 on aggregate.
