= Mengkuang Titi =

- Village in Seberang Perai
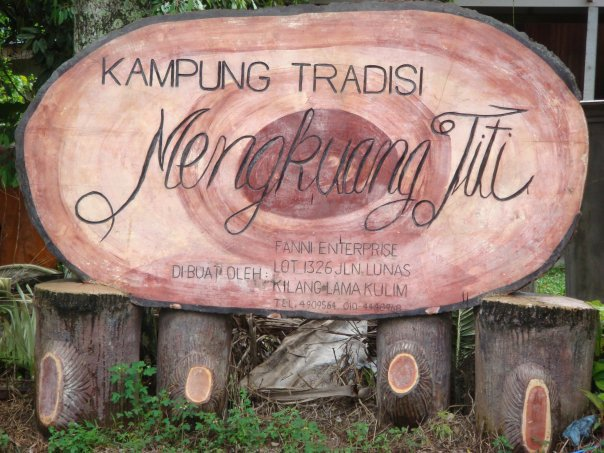

- .Location within Seberang Perai in Penang
- Coordinates: 5°23′N 100°25′E
- Country: Malaysia
- State: Penang
- City: Seberang Perai
- District: Central Seberang Perai
- Time zone: UTC+8 (MST)
  - Summer (DST): Not observed

Mengkuang Titi is a village within the city of Seberang Perai in the Malaysian state of Penang. It is located not too far from the Mengkuang Dam. The village has a population of about 800, and still retains the rustic feel ideal for the development of agricultural and cottage industries.

== Etymology ==
The word 'Mengkuang' comes from the vernacular name for Pandanus fascicularis a kind of Pandanus plant that inhabit the region. The word 'Titi' means bridge. The combination of these two words give the meaning 'The Mengkuang area where a bridge was built'. It is common to find word 'Mengkuang' in surrounding region because Kampung Mengkuang actually refers the wider whole neighborhood area. Names of the some neighborhood villages are Mengkuang Kereta Api ('kereta api' means train, Mengkuang where railway was built), Mengkuang Sekolah ('sekolah' means school, Mengkuang where school was built and Mengkuang Dam (Dam means a barrier constructed across a waterway, Mengkuang where dam was constructed).

== Economy ==
=== Agriculture and cottage industries ===
Agriculture and cottage industries are still the main sources of income. Among the cottage industries at Mengkuang Titi includes the making of Malay delicacies such as kuih bahulu, a fluffy sponge cake, and satay, grilled skewered meat served in sweet and spicy peanut sauce. People of Mengkuang Titi used to grow rubber, paddy, coconut and oil palm, but now most of the land was replaced by housing. The only plantation can be found now is oil palm estate. The vegetable crops such as onion, cauliflower, maize etc. were introduced to the village.

=== Tourism ===
Mengkuang Titi is one of the villages in Penang on the Homestay Programme. One can walk through a canopy of rubber trees, try a hand at rubber tapping and observe how latex is processed into rubber sheets. Visitors can also visit the oil palm estates and stroll amidst its neat rows of palm fronds and huge bunches of flaming orange-red oil palm fruits. Visitor should also look out for the mengkuang plants from which the village got its name. It is interesting to see how these long sharp, serrated swords like leaves are harvested, and then slowly processed into fine colourful strips ready for weaving. At the cottage industry centre nearby, one can learn the art of bahulu making.

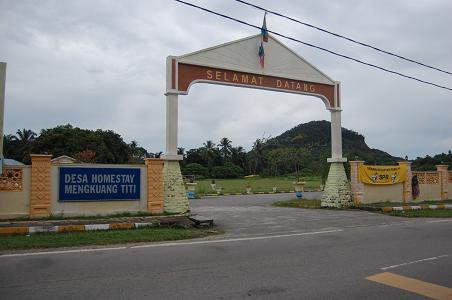
Entrance gateway of Mengkuang Titi

=== Others ===
Even the agriculture and cottage industries are the main economic activities, most of the villagers are now working in the big towns such as Bukit Mertajam, Butterworth, George Town and industrial parks such as Kulim Hi-Tech Park, Prai Industrial Estate and Bayan Baru Technology Park.

== Culture ==
Most of the villagers are practicing the traditional Malay culture with mixture from minority of Chinese and Indians.

=== Traditional games ===
Traditional Malay games are also promoted at Mengkuang Titi. These include top spinning, or gasing, bola sepak sarung and sepak raga, played by the men and congkak by the women.

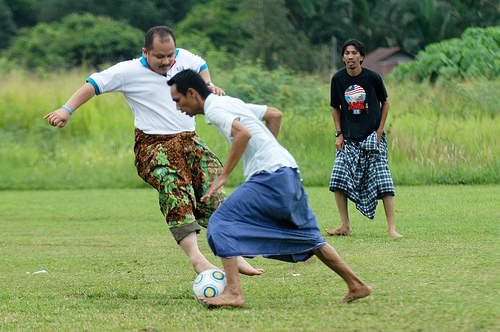
Villagers play football in traditional outfit

=== Foods ===
Mengkuang Titi is the best place to try the Malay Traditional food such as bahulu, kuih bangkit or coconut Cookies, satay and various of traditional snacks.

== How to get there ==
From Kuala Lumpur and Ipoh (from south) or Sungai Petani or Alor Star, exit the North South Expressway at the Seberang Jaya Interchange (Exit 163). Take the Butterworth Kulim Expressway (E15) east and exit it at the Mengkuang Lake Dam Interchange (Exit 1507). At the t-junction, turn left and head east on Jalan Penanti-Kulim. At the next junction, turn right and head north along Jalan Lunas. If from Kulim and east, right turn at the junction in front and underpasses the Butterworth Kulim Expressway. Continue along this road (P129). When you reach a road fork, take the right fork down state road P119. Continue along P119 until you reach Mengkuang Titi. The only available public transports are taxi and bus. By bus, from the Bukit Mertajam bus terminal, you should take bus no. 51.

== See also ==
- Penang
- Province Wellesley
- Mengkuang
- Mengkuang Dam
