= Guilherme Bissoli =

Brazilian footballer (Born 1998)

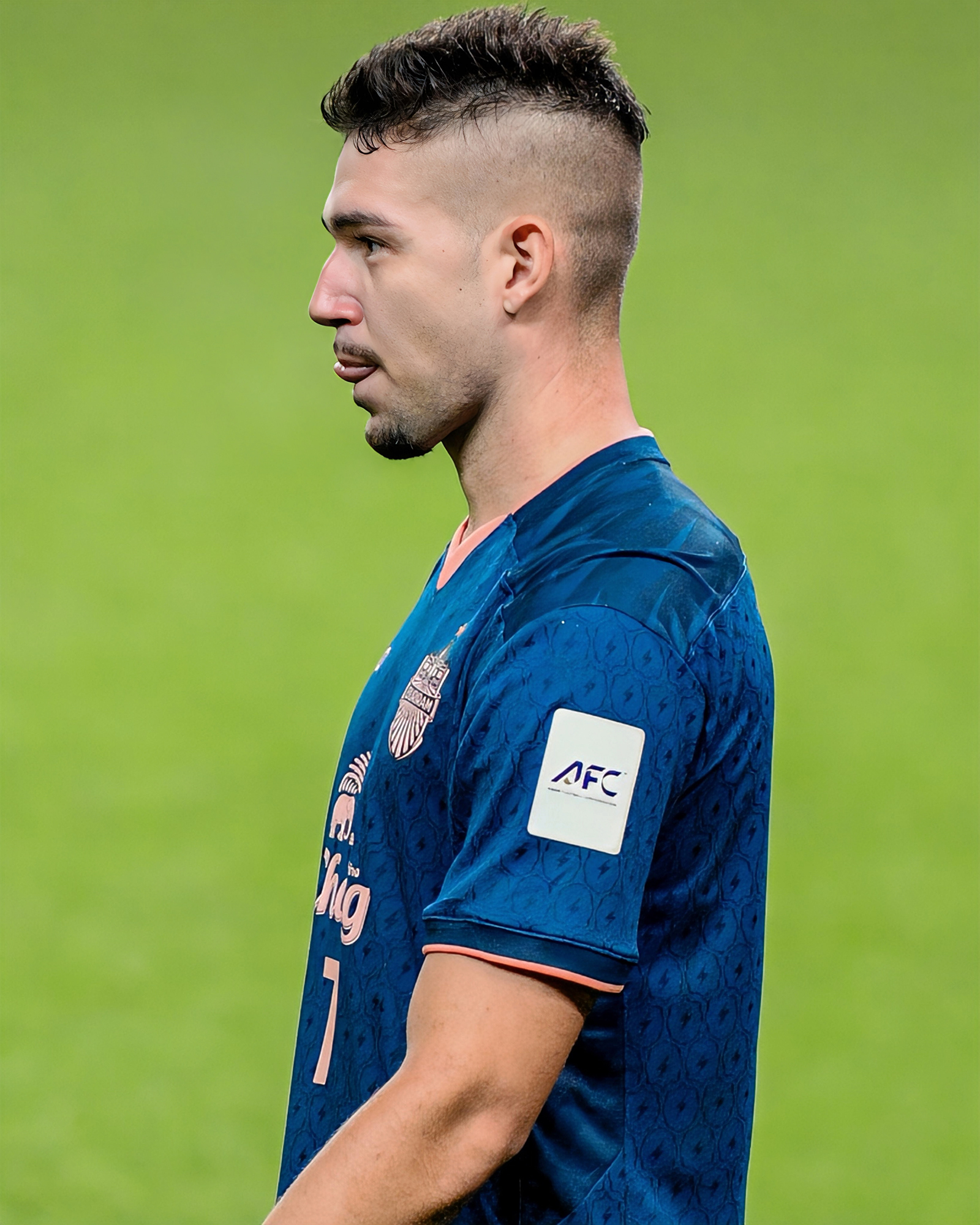
- Bissoli playing for Buriram United in 2025.

Personal information
- Full name: Guilherme Bissoli Campos
- Date of birth: 9 January 1998 (age 28)
- Place of birth: Jaú, Brazil
- Height: 1.75 m (5 ft 9 in)
- Position: Forward

Team information
- Current team: Buriram United
- Number: 7

Youth career
- 2006–2009: XV de Jaú
- 2009–2017: São Paulo

Senior career*
Years	Team	Apps	(Gls)
2017–2018	São Paulo	2	(0)
2019–2020	Fernando de la Mora	0	(0)
2020	→ Athletico Paranaense (loan)	27	(2)
2021–2023	Athletico Paranaense	27	(8)
2021	→ Cruzeiro (loan)	9	(1)
2022	→ Avaí (loan)	32	(14)
2023	Ceará	17	(3)
2024–	Buriram United	73	(68)
- * Club domestic league appearances and goals as of 20 September 2026

Guilherme Bissoli Campos (born on 9 January 1998) is a Brazilian professional footballer who plays as a forward for Thai League 1 club Buriram United.

In the 2024–25 season, Bissoli notably scored 43 goals for Buriram United, sparking comparisons with Japanese Tomoyuki Doi, who went on to score 50 goals in the same season while playing for Singaporean club Geylang International.

== Club career ==
=== São Paulo ===
Bissoli joined the youth academy of São Paulo in the year 2009. He emerged as the top scorer of the 2015 Campeonato Paulista under-17 with 22 goals. In 2016, he won the under-20 Paulista, under-20 RS Cup, and under-20 Copa do Brasil.

In November 2017, Bissoli was called to the senior team along with three other youth team players for a league match against Coritiba as replacements for injured first team players. On 3 December 2017, he made his first team league debut, replacing Brenner in a 1–1 draw against Bahia. At the end of the 2017 season, he was promoted to the first team.

=== Athletico Paranaense ===
In June 2018, Bissoli agreed to a pre-contract with Athletico Paranaense, effective as of the following January. In February 2019, after his contract expired, he was assigned to Paraguayan Primera División club Fernando de la Mora, only joining Athletico Paranaense on 17 January 2020 on loan until the end of 2020 season. He make his debut for Athletico Paranaense on 2 February in a 2–2 draw to Paraná. On 22 February, he scored a brace as his team thrash Cascavel 5–1 in the Campeonato Paranaense. On his debut in the 2020 Copa Libertadores match against Uruguay club Peñarol, he scored the only game in the match which give his team the win in the group stage. Bissoli scored in the Copa Libertadores round of 16 fixtures against Argentinean club River Plate holding them to a 1–1 draw in the first leg.

During the 2021 Copa Sudamericana quarter-final second leg match against Ecuadorian club LDU Quito on 20 August 2021, he scored a brace putting his team on a 4–3 aggregate thus qualifying to the semi-final. Bissoli went on to lift the 2021 Copa Sudamericana Final on 20 November 2021.

==== Cruzeiro (loan) ====
On 7 May 2021, Bissoli signed with Cruzeiro on a loan deal. He scored on his debut but his team suffered a 3–1 defeat to Confiança on 29 May.

==== Avaí (loan) ====
On 8 April 2022, Bissoli joined Avai on loan. He make his debut on 11 April in a 1–0 win over América Mineiro. Bissoli scored a brace in a league match against Fortaleza giving his team a 3–2 win on 17 June. Bissoli went on to have a goal loan spell with the club scoring 14 goals in 32 matches for the club.

==== Transfer controversy ====
In January 2020, São Paulo's Football Executive manager Alexandre Pássaro stated that the club would seek to initiate an investigation on Bissoli's signing for Athletico, saying that "If we offer a certain contract and another club offers the same or even a bigger one, São Paulo can cover the offer, and the player is obliged to stay. A year ago, we had this exact episode with Athletico-PR, who made an offer for Bissoli. We matched, they increased, we matched again, and he stayed here." Bissoli, however, refused to stay at São Paulo, and left the club when his contract expired in February 2019.

=== Ceará ===
On 3 July 2023, Bissoli joined Ceará. He make his debut on 8 July in a league match against Botofogo. In the away fixtures against the same club on 4 November, Bissoli put on a 'man of the match' display where he got an assisted and scoring a goal in a 2–2 draw. He went on to score in another two consecutive league matches against Mirassol and Vila Nova.

=== Buriram United ===
==== 2023–24 ====
On 20 January 2024, Bissoli moved to Southeast Asia to signed with Thai League 1 club Buriram United. He scored on his debut for the club in a 2–1 win over Lamphun Warriors on 11 February. In the next match on 14 February, Bissoli scored a brace and recorded an assist as his team defeated Sukhothai 4–0. He then scored a goal and recorded an assisted helping his team to win 4–3 against Trat in an away match. On 24 February, Bissoli scored four goals in one match which was also his first professional career hat-trick in a 6–2 thrashing win against Police Tero. He then scored in his fifth consecutive league match where he scored a brace in a 3–2 win over Bangkok United on 3 March. In 5 matches, Bissoli has already racked up 10 goals. He ended the 2023–24 season with 18 goals in 19 appearances helping the club to win the league title.

==== 2024–25 ====
Bissoli then stayed for the 2024–25 season. On 1 October 2024, Bissoli helped the club to secure a 2–1 win in the 2024–25 AFC Champions League Elite group stage match where he scored a goal against Australian club Central Coast Mariners. In the next match on 22 October, he scored the only goal in the match against Korean club Pohang Steelers to secure a win. On 8 December, Bissoli scored four goals in a league match where Buriram United thrash Ratchaburi 6–0. During the second round of the 2024–25 Thai FA Cup, he scored a hat-trick against Thai League 2 club Maharasakham SBT on 18 December. On 12 February 2025, Bissoli scored in a match helping his team to a 2–1 win against Korean club Ulsan Hyundai. In the next match against another Korean club Gwangju on 18 February, he scored and assist in the match to a 2–2 draw helping his team qualify to the AFC Champions League Elite round of 16. In his second season at the club, he won the domestic treble helping Buriram United to win the 2024–25 league title, 2024–25 Thai FA Cup and the 2024–25 Thai League Cup. Bissoli also helped the club to win the 2024–25 ASEAN Club Championship winning his fourth title in the season. Bissoli remarkably went on to have a good career record in the season racking up to 43 goals and contributing 9 assists in 61 appearances for the club in the 2024–25 season where he also won the league top scorer award with 25 goals. On 7 June, his hard work was rewarded with a contract renewal until June 2028.

==== 2025–26 ====
Bissoli started off the 2025–26 season where he scored in the opening league match against Lamphun Warrior in a 3–2 win on 16 August 2025. He then went on to score a hat-trick in the next league match on 24 August in a 5–1 thrashing win over Uthai Thani.

== Personal life ==
Bissoli's father Celinho also played youth football for São Paulo (never reaching higher than the under-20 level).

== Career statistics ==
As of match played 10 February 2026

Club	Season	League			State league (Note: Includes Campeonato Paulista, Campeonato Paranaense, Campeonato Mineiro)		National cup (Note: Includes Copa do Brasil, Thai FA Cup)		League cup (Note: Includes Thai League Cup)		Continental		Other		Total	
Club	Season	Division	Apps	Goals	Apps	Goals	Apps	Goals	Apps	Goals	Apps	Goals	Apps	Goals	Apps	Goals
São Paulo	2016	Série A	0	0	0	0	0	0	—		—		7 (Note: Appearances in Copa Paulista)	1	7	1
São Paulo	2017	Série A	1	0	0	0	0	0	—		—		7	4	8	4
São Paulo	2018	Série A	0	0	1	0	1	0	—		—		—		2	0
São Paulo	Total		1	0	1	0	1	0	—		—		14	5	17	5
Athletico Paranaense	2020	Série A	15	0	8	6	1	1	—		6 (Note: Appearances in Copa Libertadores)	2	1 (Note: Appearance in Supercopa do Brasil)	0	31	9
Athletico Paranaense	2021	Série A	21	3	4	2	0	0	—		3 (Note: Appearances in Copa Sudamericana)	2	—		28	7
Athletico Paranaense	2022	Série A	0	0	6	0	0	0	—		—		0	0	6	0
Athletico Paranaense	Total		36	3	18	8	1	1	—		9	4	1	0	65	16
Cruzeiro (loan)	2021	Série B	8	2	1	0	2	0	—		—		—		11	2
Avaí (loan)	2022	Série A	32	14	—		—		—		—		—		32	14
Ceará (loan)	2023	Série B	17	3	—		—		—		—		—		17	3
Buriram United	2023–24	Thai League 1	15	16	—		0	0	3	2	—		—		18	17
Buriram United	2024–25	Thai League 1	30	25	—		6	7	5	4	11 (Note: Appearances in AFC Champions League Elite)	4	9 (Note: Appearances in ASEAN Club Championship)	3	61	43
Buriram United	2025–26	Thai League 1	25	23	—		2	6	2	2	7	1	5	4	32	28
Buriram United	Total		70	64	—		8	13	10	8	18	5	14	7	111	88
Career total			155	78	20	8	12	14	10	8	27	9	29	12	253	128

== Honours ==
Athletico Paranaense

- Campeonato Paranaense: 2020
- Copa Sudamericana: 2021

Buriram United

- Thai League: 2023–24, 2024–25, 2025–26
- Thai FA Cup: 2024–25
- Thai League Cup: 2024–25
- ASEAN Club Championship: 2024–25, 2025–26

Individual

- Thai League Best XI Mid-Season: 2024–25
- Thai League 1 Team of the Season: 2025–26
- Thai League top scorer: 2024–25, 2025–26
- ASEAN Club Championship: Best Player 2025–26
