= 2025–26 ASEAN Club Championship =

Fourth edition of the ASEAN Club Championship

2025–26 Shopee Cup
Tournament details
- Dates: Qualifying: 8–15 August 2025; Competition proper: 20 August 2025 – 27 May 2026
- Teams: Competition proper: 12; Total (maximum): 14 (from 9 associations)

Final positions
- Champions: (Thailand) Buriram United (2nd title)
- Runners-up: (Malaysia) Selangor

Tournament statistics
- Matches played: 36
- Goals scored: 119 (3.31 per match)
- Attendance: 261,005 (7,250 per match)
- Top scorer(s): Nguyễn Xuân Son (Nam Định); Bérgson (Johor Darul Ta'zim); 7 goals each
- Best player: Guilherme Bissoli (Buriram United)
- Best young player: Nathakorn Ratthanasuwan (Buriram United)
- Best goalkeeper: Kalamullah Al-Hafiz (Selangor)

The 2025–26 ASEAN Club Championship (2025–26 ACC), known as the 2025–26 Shopee Cup due to sponsorship reasons, was the fourth edition of the ASEAN Club Championship, an international football competition between clubs affiliated with the ASEAN Football Federation.

The final was played between Selangor and Buriram United at Petaling Jaya Stadium in Petaling Jaya, Malaysia on first leg, Buriram Stadium in Buriram, Thailand on second leg. Buriram United, the defending champions, beat Selangor 3–1 on aggregate to win a record 2nd title. With this victory, Buriram United became the first team to successfully defend their title in competition's history.

== Association team allocation ==
Clubs from all twelve member football associations of the ASEAN Football Federation were eligible to enter the competition; Australia and Timor Leste did not enter, while Indonesia withdrew due to logistical reasons.

Participation for 2025–26 ASEAN Club Championship
| Participating |
| Not participating |

| Member association | Group stage | Play-off |
|---|---|---|
| Thailand | 2 (+1 ACC) | — |
| Vietnam | 2 | — |
| Malaysia | 2 | — |
| Indonesia | ~~2~~ | — |
| Singapore | 2 | — |
| Cambodia | 1 | — |
| Philippines | — | 1 |
| Myanmar | — | 1 |
| Laos | — | 1 |
| Brunei | — | 1 |
| Australia | — | — |
| Timor-Leste | — | — |
| Total | 10 | 4 |
| Total | 14 | |

Notes

1. Indonesia (IDN): 2024–25 Liga 1 champions and runners-up, Persib and Dewa United Banten, were initially invited by the AFF to participate in the 2025–26 ASEAN Club Championship. However, both teams declined to take part due to logistical issues. Liga Indonesia Baru then proposed sending Malut United and Persebaya, the third- and fourth-placed teams of the 2024–25 Liga 1, but the proposal was rejected by the AFF.

== Teams ==
Group stage direct entrants
| Team | Qualifying method | App. (last) |
|---|---|---|
| (Thailand) Buriram United | 2024–25 ASEAN Club Championship title holder 2024–25 Thai League 1 champions | 2nd (2024–25) |
| (Thailand) Bangkok United | 2024–25 Thai League 1 runners-up | 1st |
| (Thailand) BG Pathum United | 2024–25 Thai League 1 third place | 2nd (2024–25) |
| (Vietnam) Thép Xanh Nam Định | 2024–25 V.League 1 champions | 1st |
| (Vietnam) Công An Hà Nội | 2024–25 Vietnamese Cup winners | 2nd (2024–25) |
| (Malaysia) Johor Darul Ta'zim | 2024–25 Malaysia Super League champions | 1st |
| (Malaysia) Selangor | 2024–25 Malaysia Super League runners-up | 1st |
| (Singapore) Lion City Sailors | 2024–25 Singapore Premier League champions | 2nd (2024–25) |
| (Singapore) Tampines Rovers | 2024–25 Singapore Premier League runners-up | 2nd (2005) |
| (Cambodia) Preah Khan Reach Svay Rieng | 2024–25 Cambodian Premier League champions | 2nd (2024–25) |

Qualifying play-off participants
| Team | Qualifying method | App. (last) |
|---|---|---|
| (Philippines) DH Cebu | 2024–25 Philippines Football League Finals Series winners | 1st |
| (Myanmar) Shan United | 2024–25 Myanmar National League champions | 2nd (2024–25) |
| (Laos) Ezra | 2024–25 Lao League 1 champions | 1st |
| (Brunei) Kasuka | 2024–25 Brunei Super League champions | 2nd (2024–25) |

Withdrawn teams
| Team | Qualifying method |
|---|---|
| (Indonesia) Persib | 2024–25 Liga 1 champions |
| (Indonesia) Dewa United Banten | 2024–25 Liga 1 runners-up |

== Round and draw dates ==
The schedule of the competition is as follows.

Schedule for 2025–26 ASEAN Club Championship
| Stage | Round | Draw date | First leg | Second leg |
|---|---|---|---|---|
| Qualifying stage | Qualifying play-off | 4 July 2025 | 8–9 August 2025 | 15 August 2025 |
| Group stage | Matchday 1 | 4 July 2025 | 20–21 August 2025 | |
| Group stage | Matchday 2 | 4 July 2025 | 24–25 September 2025 | |
| Group stage | Matchday 3 | 4 July 2025 | 3–4 December 2025 | |
| Group stage | Matchday 4 | 4 July 2025 | 17 December 2025 and 28 January 2026 | |
| Group stage | Matchday 5 | 4 July 2025 | 29 January and 4 February 2026 | |
| Group stage | Matchday 6 (Group B only) | 4 July 2025 | 5 February and 22 April 2026 | |
| Knockout stage | | 4 July 2025 | | |
| Knockout stage | Semi-finals | 4 July 2025 | 6 May 2026 | 13 May 2026 |
| Knockout stage | Final | 4 July 2025 | 20 May 2026 | 27 May 2026 |

== Qualifying play-offs ==
The first leg was played on 8 and 9 August, and the second leg on 15 August 2025. The winners of the ties advanced to the group stage.

Play-off round
| Team 1 | Agg. | Team 2 | 1st leg | 2nd leg |
|---|---|---|---|---|
| Kasuka (Brunei) | 2–4 | (Philippines) DH Cebu | 2–1 | 0–3 |
| Ezra (Laos) | 1–3 | (Myanmar) Shan United | 1–2 | 0–1 |

== Group stage ==
At the draw on 4 July 2025 in Bangkok, Thailand, fourteen teams were drawn into two groups of seven. Teams from the same association were not placed in the same group, with the exception of Thailand, where a maximum of two Thai teams (one being the title holder) can be placed in the same group. The group stage is a single round-robin format.

Initially, the top four teams from each group advance to a quarter-final stage. However, following the withdrawal of Indonesian teams, the quarter-finals were removed; only the top two teams will qualify for the semi-finals.

Location of the 2025–26 ASEAN Club Championship group stage teams
Red: Group A; Yellow: Group B
Location of the 2025–26 ASEAN Club Championship group stage teams from Bangkok
Location of the 2025–26 ASEAN Club Championship group stage teams from Singapore

=== Group A ===
| Pos | Team | Pld | W | D | L | GF | GA | GD | Pts | Qualification | BRU | SEL | BGP | CAH | BGT | DHC |
|---|---|---|---|---|---|---|---|---|---|---|---|---|---|---|---|---|
| 1 | (Thailand) Buriram United | 5 | 2 | 3 | 0 | 14 | 5 | +9 | 9 | Advance to knockout stage | — | 1–1 | — | 1–1 | — | 6–0 |
| 2 | (Malaysia) Selangor | 5 | 2 | 3 | 0 | 9 | 5 | +4 | 9 | Advance to knockout stage | — | — | 1–1 | 2–0 | 4–2 | — |
| 3 | (Thailand) BG Pathum United | 5 | 2 | 2 | 1 | 9 | 7 | +2 | 8 | | 2–2 | — | — | 2–1 | — | 2–0 |
| 4 | (Vietnam) Công An Hà Nội | 5 | 2 | 1 | 2 | 9 | 6 | +3 | 7 | | — | — | — | — | 6–1 | 1–0 |
| 5 | (Singapore) Tampines Rovers | 5 | 2 | 0 | 3 | 10 | 17 | −7 | 6 | | 1–4 | — | 3–2 | — | — | — |
| 6 | (Philippines) Dynamic Herb Cebu | 5 | 0 | 1 | 4 | 2 | 13 | −11 | 1 | | — | 1–1 | — | — | 1–3 | — |

Source: ASEAN United FC
Rules for classification: Tiebreakers

=== Group B ===
| Pos | Team | Pld | W | D | L | GF | GA | GD | Pts | Qualification | NDI | JDT | PKR | BKU | LCS | SUN |
|---|---|---|---|---|---|---|---|---|---|---|---|---|---|---|---|---|
| 1 | (Vietnam) Nam Định | 5 | 4 | 1 | 0 | 13 | 3 | +10 | 13 | Advance to knockout stage | — | 1–1 | 2–1 | — | 3–0 | — |
| 2 | (Malaysia) Johor Darul Ta'zim | 5 | 3 | 2 | 0 | 13 | 4 | +9 | 11 | Advance to knockout stage | — | — | — | 4–0 | 3–1 | 3–0 |
| 3 | (Cambodia) Preah Khan Reach Svay Rieng | 5 | 2 | 2 | 1 | 9 | 5 | +4 | 8 | | — | 2–2 | — | 1–1 | — | — |
| 4 | (Thailand) Bangkok United | 5 | 1 | 2 | 2 | 6 | 12 | −6 | 5 | | 1–4 | — | — | — | 2–2 | 2–1 |
| 5 | (Singapore) Lion City Sailors | 5 | 1 | 1 | 3 | 6 | 12 | −6 | 4 | | — | — | 0–2 | — | — | 3–2 |
| 6 | (Myanmar) Shan United | 5 | 0 | 0 | 5 | 3 | 14 | −11 | 0 | | 0–3 | — | 0–3 | — | — | — |

Source: ASEAN United FC
Rules for classification: Tiebreakers

== Knockout stage ==
In the knockout stage, teams will play against each other over two legs on a home-and-away basis. The top four teams from the final standings in the group stage entered at the semi-finals.

=== Bracket ===
Semi-finals
A2 | (Malaysia) Selangor | 2 | 2 | 4
B1 | (Vietnam) Nam Định | 1 | 0 | 1
B2 | (Malaysia) Johor Darul Ta'zim | 1 | 2 | 3
A1 | (Thailand) Buriram United (a.e.t.) | 3 | 1 | 4

Final
A2 | (Malaysia) Selangor | 0 | 1 | 1
A1 | (Thailand) Buriram United | 1 | 2 | 3

=== Semi-finals ===
The first legs were played on 6 May, and the second legs were played on 13 May 2026.

| Team 1 | Agg. | Team 2 | 1st leg | 2nd leg |
|---|---|---|---|---|
| Selangor (Malaysia) | 4–1 | (Vietnam) Nam Định | 2–1 | 2–0 |
| Johor Darul Ta'zim (Malaysia) | 3–4 | (Thailand) Buriram United | 1–3 | 2–1 (a.e.t.) |

=== Final ===
| Team 1 | Agg. | Team 2 | 1st leg | 2nd leg |
|---|---|---|---|---|
| Selangor (Malaysia) | 1–3 | (Thailand) Buriram United | 0–1 | 1–2 |

20 May 2026
21:00 UTC+8

| Selangor (Malaysia) | 0–1 | (Thailand) Buriram United |
|---|---|---|
| | Report | Suphanat 25' |

Petaling Jaya Stadium, Petaling Jaya
Attendance: 8,943
Referee: Rustam Lutfullin (Uzbekistan)

27 May 2026
19:00 UTC+7

| Buriram United (Thailand) | 2–1 | (Malaysia) Selangor |
|---|---|---|
| Suphanat 27'; Theerathon 55' | Report | Bashah 18' |

Buriram Stadium, Buriram
Attendance: 30,889
Referee: Hiroki Kasahara (Japan)

== Season statistics ==
=== Top scorers ===
Team eliminated / inactive for this round.

| Rank | Player | Team | MD1 | MD2 | MD3 | MD4 | MD5 | SF1 | SF2 | F1 | F2 | Total |
|---|---|---|---|---|---|---|---|---|---|---|---|---|
| 1 | (Vietnam) Nguyễn Xuân Son | (Vietnam) Nam Định | 2 | | 3 | 2 | | | | | | 7 |
| 1 | (Brazil) Bérgson | (Malaysia) Johor Darul Ta'zim | | 3 | | 2 | 1 | | 1 | | | 7 |
| 3 | (Brazil) Guilherme Bissoli | (Thailand) Buriram United | | 1 | 1 | 2 | | 2 | | | | 6 |
| 4 | (Brazil) Chrigor | (Malaysia) Selangor | 1 | | | | | 2 | 2 | | | 5 |
| 4 | (Japan) Hide Higashikawa | (Singapore) BG Tampines Rovers | 1 | 1 | 3 | | | | | | | 5 |
| 6 | (Thailand) Suphanat Mueanta | (Thailand) Buriram United | | | | 1 | 1 | | | 1 | 1 | 4 |
| 6 | (Brazil) Patrick | (Cambodia) Svay Rieng | 1 | 1 | | | 2 | | | | | 4 |
| 6 | (Malaysia) Faisal Halim | (Malaysia) Selangor | | 1 | | 2 | 1 | | | | | 4 |
| 9 | (Thailand) Chanathip Songkrasin | (Thailand) BG Pathum United | 2 | 1 | | | | | | | | 3 |
| 9 | (Serbia) Goran Čaušić | (Thailand) Buriram United | | | | 1 | 1 | 1 | | | | 3 |
| 9 | (Brazil) João Figueiredo | (Malaysia) Johor Darul Ta'zim | 2 | 1 | | | | | | | | 3 |
| 9 | (Brazil) Alan Grafite | (Vietnam) Công An Hà Nội | 1 | | | | 2 | | | | | 3 |

Note

- Goals scored in the qualifying play-offs are not counted when determining top scorer

=== Team of the Tournament ===
| Pos. | Player | Team |
|---|---|---|
| Goalkeeper | (Philippines) Neil Etheridge | (Thailand) Buriram United |
| Defenders | (Thailand) Theerathon Bunmathan | (Thailand) Buriram United |
| Defenders | (Thailand) Pansa Hemviboon | (Thailand) Buriram United |
| Defenders | (Malaysia) Quentin Cheng | (Malaysia) Selangor |
| Midfielders | (Spain) Óscar Arribas | (Malaysia) Johor Darul Ta'zim |
| Midfielders | (Austria) Peter Žulj | (Thailand) Buriram United |
| Midfielders | (Spain) Nacho Méndez | (Malaysia) Johor Darul Ta'zim |
| Midfielders | (Jordan) Noor Al-Rawabdeh | (Malaysia) Selangor |
| Midfielders | (Malaysia) Faisal Halim | (Malaysia) Selangor |
| Forwards | (Brazil) Chrigor | (Malaysia) Selangor |
| Forwards | (Brazil) Bérgson | (Malaysia) Johor Darul Ta'zim |

Bergson was a Brazilian citizenship before being naturalised to play for Malaysia in Semptember 2026

=== Player of the Tournament ===
- (Brazil) Guilherme Bissoli ( (Thailand) Buriram United)

=== Young Player of the Tournament ===
- (Thailand) Nathakorn Ratthanasuwan ( (Thailand) Buriram United)

=== Best Goalkeeper ===
- (Malaysia) Kalamullah Al-Hafiz ( (Malaysia) Selangor)

== See also ==
- 2026 CAFA Silk Way Cup
- 2026 SAFF Club Championship
- 2025–26 AGCFF Gulf Club Champions League
