= Kelantan F.C. 2–11 Selangor F.C. =

Football match

Kelantan v Selangor
- Event: 2023 Malaysia Super League
Kelantan	Selangor
2	11
- Date: 25 August 2023
- Venue: Sultan Muhammad IV Stadium, Kota Bharu
- Man of the Match: Ayron del Valle (Selangor)
- Referee: Nazmi Nasaruddin (Penang)
- Attendance: 1,002
- Weather: Good; 26 °C (79 °F)

The 2023 Malaysia Super League match between Kelantan and Selangor at Sultan Muhammad IV Stadium, Kota Bharu, took place on Friday 25 August 2023. Selangor won the match 11–2, for the largest win in the history of the competition. The result also set the new record for the biggest away win in the history of Malaysian top-flight football.

== Background ==
Selangor went into the match in second place in the 2023 Malaysia Super League table on 46 points, 14 points behind rivals Johor Darul Ta'zim (JDT), albeit having played 21 matches to JDT's 20. Meanwhile, Kelantan struggle to escaping the relegation zone, where their on 13th place in the league, been on bottom of the table alongside Kuching City.

== Match ==
=== Summary ===
The match took place at Sultan Muhammad IV Stadium at 21:00 on 25 August 2023 in front of a crowd of 1,002. Selangor kicked off, and within the first few minutes the home team had put pressure into the Selangor area, until Kelantan were eventually awarded a penalty in the 5th minute when Natanael Siringoringo was denied a goalscoring opportunity in the penalty area by Harith Haiqal. Siringoringo converted the spot-kick to make the score 1–0. Selangor was again been punished after Sharul Nazeem's defensive error gave Fazrul Amir a second chance to break through the goal post through Siringoringo pass in the 14th minute, give doubled Kelantan's lead. The visitors came up with more determination and managed to close the gap with the first goal through Yohandry Orozco's simple toss in the 28th minute and got the equalizer from Sharul Nazeem's goal in the 32nd minute. Selangor makes a comeback with the third goal scored by Ayron del Valle in the 41st minute, before he added a fourth goal for the away side three minutes later before end of the first half.

At half-time, Selangor brought on Faisal Halim in place of Mukhairi Ajmal to strengthen the visitors' attack. Selangor continued to push the home team to score the fifth goal through Richmond Boakye's shot in the 48th minute. Faisal scored twice with a solo run in the 50th minute and tossed the ball into the Kelantan goal three minutes later for Selangor's sixth and seventh goals. Ayron completed his hat-trick on the 63rd minute, and the ninth and tenth goals respectively were scored by Boakye who headed the ball easily in the 78th minute before creating a hat-trick in the 86th minute. It was the first in Super League history that two players scored a hat-trick for one team in the same game. Ayron completed the 11–2 scoreline three minutes before second-half stoppage time. The result remained until the end of the match.

=== Match details ===
25 August 2023
21:00 UTC+08:00

Kelantan	2–11	Selangor
Siringoringo 5' (pen.); Fazrul 13'	Report	Orozco 28'; Sharul 32'; Ayron 41', 44', 63', 87'; Boakye 48', 78', 86'; Faisal 50', 53'

Sultan Muhammad IV Stadium, Kota Bharu
Attendance: 1,002
Referee: Nazmi Nasaruddin (Penang)

Kelantan	Selangor

GK	89	(Malaysia) Irfan Haikal
RB	7	(Malaysia) Arip Amiruddin
CB	4	(Malaysia) Ghaffar Rahman
CB	5	(Malaysia) Yusri Yuhasmadi (c)
LB	45	(Malaysia) Hafiq Al Muhafiz	(substituted off) 55'
DM	88	(Malaysia) Muhaimin Izuddin
CM	78	(Malaysia) Afif Jazimin	(substituted off) 48'
CM	96	(Malaysia) Farish Aswadi
RW	48	(Malaysia) Khala'if Naskam	(substituted off) 78'
ST	10	(Indonesia) Natanael Siringoringo
LW	17	(Malaysia) Fazrul Amir	(substituted off) 78'
Substitutes:
GK	76	(Malaysia) Johan Shahzidane
DF	41	(Malaysia) Reegan Saravanan
DF	70	(Malaysia) Khairul Amin	(substituted in) 78'
DF	98	(Malaysia) Izzat Azmi	(substituted in) 78'
MF	61	(Malaysia) Ammar Nuqman
MF	65	(Malaysia) Haikal Pauzi
MF	99	(Malaysia) Allee Putra	(substituted in) 48'
FW	49	(Malaysia) Hariharan Kartheyges
FW	97	(Malaysia) Izaham Haslin	(substituted in) 55'
Manager:
(Argentina) Angel Alfredo Vera

GK	23	(Malaysia) Sam Sommerville
RB	2	(Malaysia) Quentin Cheng	(substituted off) 70'
CB	44	(Malaysia) Sharul Nazeem
CB	55	(Malaysia) Harith Haiqal
LB	22	(Malaysia) Fazly Mazlan
CM	8	(Jordan) Noor Al-Rawabdeh	(substituted off) 59'
CM	10	(Malaysia) Mukhairi Ajmal	(substituted off) 45'
CM	88	(Malaysia) Brendan Gan (c)
AM	16	(Venezuela) Yohandry Orozco	(substituted off) 59'
CF	9	(Ghana) Richmond Boakye
CF	70	(Colombia) Ayron del Valle
Substitutes:
GK	1	(Malaysia) Khairulazhan Khalid
DF	18	(Malaysia) Khuzaimi Piee	(substituted in) 83'
DF	31	(Malaysia) Faiz Amer	(substituted in) 70'
MF	24	(Ghana) Alex Agyarkwa	(yellow card) 14'	(substituted in) 59'
MF	31	(Malaysia) Haiqal Haqeemi
MF	77	(Malaysia) Aliff Haiqal	(substituted in) 59'	(substituted off) 83'
FW	7	(Malaysia) Faisal Halim	(substituted in) 45'
FW	17	(Malaysia) Danial Asri
FW	36	(Malaysia) Abdul Rahman
Coach:
(Malaysia) Tan Cheng Hoe

Man of the Match:
Ayron del Valle (Selangor)

Assistant referees:
Kesava Raj Neelamagan
Shahir Saffie
Fourth official:
Hanis Maani

Match rules

- 90 minutes
- No extra time or penalties
- Nine named substitutes
- Maximum of five substitutions

=== Statistics ===
Statistic	Kelantan	Selangor
Goals scored	2	11
Total shots	6	30
Shots on target	4	17
Ball possession	46%	54%
Corner kicks	3	7
Fouls conceded	6	8
Yellow cards	0	1
Red cards	0	0

== Aftermath and reaction ==
The result was Selangor's biggest league victory in 87 years. Kelantan has now broken the Malaysian football record with recorded 106 goals conceded in all competitions this season including a record breaking 87 goals conceded in the Super League. On previous results they also lost with a big score to Terengganu with a result of 8–0 in the league match and also Johor Darul Ta'zim (JDT) with a result of 10–0 in the cup match. Kelantan head coach Angel Alfredo Vera said that the lack of imported players in his squad was one of the reasons for the team’s crushing big loss defeat to Selangor in their Super League match. He shrugged off the result saying, “We didn’t have players who could dominate this match, especially imported players. The players we have are very young, they don’t have the experience, on average they have only played five Super League matches,” he told the post-match press conference. The outcome was also the worst loss by a home team in Malaysian football history, as the eleventh-goal difference doubled the previous record margin.
