= 2023 Selangor F.C. season =

2023 season of Malaysian association football club

Selangor
2023 season
- Chairman: Tengku Amir Shah
- Manager: Mahfizul Rusydin
- Head coach: Tan Cheng Hoe
- Stadium: MBPJ Stadium
- Super League: 2nd
- FA Cup: Semi-finals
- Malaysia Cup: Quarter-finals
- Top goalscorer: League: (23 goals); Ayron del Valle; All: (25 goals); Ayron del Valle
- Highest home attendance: 14,462; Super League; Selangor vs Johor Darul Ta'zim (17 March 2023)
- Lowest home attendance: 5,106; FA Cup; Selangor vs Sri Pahang (15 April 2023)
- Average home league attendance: 7,975
- Biggest win: 11–2 vs Kelantan (A), 25 August 2023, Super League
- Biggest defeat: 0–4 vs Johor Darul Ta'zim (H), 17 March 2023, Super League; 0–4 vs Johor Darul Ta'zim (A), 26 June 2023, FA Cup
Home colours	Away colours	Third colours

The 2023 season is Selangor's 18th season in the Super League and their 38th consecutive season in the top flight of Malaysia football. The club also participates in the Malaysia Cup and will also participate in the FA Cup. Following the rebuilding of Shah Alam Stadium, Selangor played all home fixtures at MBPJ Stadium during this season.

== Review ==
For 2023 season, Malaysian Football League (MFL) announced the new season will restructuring with 18 teams (instead of 12 previously) in the league matches. However, with the withdrawal of several clubs from the Malaysian League, the MFL confirmed that only 14 teams will play in the league this season. Also, The MFL confirmed that each team is allowed to take 9 import players. Although the MFL will follow the AFC regulations in the use of 6 import players, the MFL still remains by allow only five import players to be fielded, which is three plus one Asian player and one ASEAN player, at any one time while only one import player can be on the bench.

With under new coach Tan Cheng Hoe who takes a charge for the club last season, Selangor maintain and released several players for a preparation a new campaign for 2023 season. Selangor also made several changes of coaching staff, with bring a new second Assistant Head Coach who has managed a team in the Malaysian Football scene and has extensive experience in Europe, Ramón Marcote. Marcote previously worked with Tan Cheng Hoe, as a Fitness Coach at Kedah in 2015. At the same time, Selangor has also brought in another new face to the Red Giants the coaching line up, Fouzi Mukhlas, who will be this season as a Goalkeeper Coach.

On 2 December, Selangor confirmed their slot to the AFC Champions League Two next season, after beating Kedah Darul Aman 1–0 in the Super League match at Darul Aman Stadium. The victory also confirmed Selangor's position at second place in the league.

Throughout the season, the first team played in 33 matches, won 23, drew two, and lost eight. The defensive line recorded 12 clean sheets, eleven (11) in the Super League and one in the FA Cup. Furthermore, the squad scored 85 competitive goals in the 2023 season, at an average of 2.6 goals per game, while conceding 33. The season's biggest winning streak is seven games in a row, while the season's longest losing streak (without a victory) is merely two games. Among other individual achievements, Faisal Halim managed to maintain his position as one of the Top Local Scorers for the club with 12 goals despite not being able to play with the team in several matches. Likewise Ayron del Valle, he has booked the title as the Top Scorer for the club, also in the Super League since match week 20th despite only being here for one season.

== Players ==
=== First-team ===
Squad No.	Name	Nationality	Position(s)	Date of birth (age)	Noted
Goalkeepers
1	Khairulazhan Khalid	(Malaysia)	GK	7 November 1989 (aged 34)	
23	Sam Somerville	(Malaysia)	GK	6 August 1994 (aged 29)	
Defenders
2	Quentin Cheng	(Malaysia) (Australia)	RB / RWB	20 November 1999 (aged 24)	
14	Zikri Khalili	(Malaysia)	LB / RB	25 June 2002 (aged 21)	
18	Khuzaimi Piee	(Malaysia)	CB / LB	11 November 1993 (aged 30)	
19	V. Ruventhiran	(Malaysia)	LB / LWB / LM	24 August 2001 (aged 22)	
21	Safuwan Baharudin	(Singapore)	CB / DM / CM	22 September 1991 (aged 32)	
22	Fazly Mazlan	(Malaysia)	LB / LWB	22 December 1993 (aged 29)	
44	Sharul Nazeem	(Malaysia)	CB	16 November 1999 (aged 24)	
55	Harith Haiqal	(Malaysia)	CB / DM	22 June 2002 (aged 21)	
Midfielders
8	Noor Al-Rawabdeh	(Jordan)	CM / DM	24 February 1997 (aged 26)	
10	Mukhairi Ajmal	(Malaysia)	CM / LM / LW / AM	7 November 2001 (aged 22)	
16	Yohandry Orozco	(Venezuela)	CM / AM / LW / RW	19 March 1991 (aged 32)	
24	Alex Agyarkwa	(Ghana)	CM / DM	18 July 2000 (aged 23)	
43	Syahir Bashah	(Malaysia)	LM / RM / AM	16 September 2001 (aged 22)	
76	Aliff Izwan	(Malaysia)	CM / AM / CF	10 February 2004 (aged 19)	(Note: Promoted from Reserve Team.)
77	Aliff Haiqal	(Malaysia)	CM / LM / RM	11 July 2000 (aged 23)	
88	Brendan Gan (C)	(Malaysia) (Australia)	CM / DM	3 June 1988 (aged 35)	
Forwards
7	Faisal Halim	(Malaysia)	LW / RW / LM / RM	7 January 1998 (aged 25)	
9	Richmond Boakye	(Ghana)	CF / LW / RW	28 January 1993 (aged 30)	
17	Danial Asri	(Malaysia)	LW / LM / CF	1 April 2000 (aged 23)	
70	Ayron del Valle	(Colombia)	CF / LW / RW	27 January 1989 (aged 34)	
Out on loan
3	Azrin Afiq	(Malaysia)	LB / LM / CB	2 January 2000 (aged 23)	
6	Zahril Azri	(Malaysia)	CM / DM	4 February 1999 (aged 24)	
25	Sikh Izhan Nazrel	(Malaysia)	GK	23 March 2002 (aged 21)	
30	Hein Htet Aung	(Myanmar)	RW / LW / RM / LM	5 October 2001 (aged 22)	
Player left the club during the season
5	Yazan Al-Arab	(Jordan)	CB	31 January 1996 (aged 27)	
11	Hakim Hassan	(Malaysia)	LM / LW / AM	2 October 1991 (aged 31)	

=== Reserve Team ===
Squad No.	Name	Nationality	Position(s)	Date of birth (age)	Noted
Selangor II, III & IV
20	Rauf Salifu	(Ghana)	ST / CF	23 April 2002 (aged 21)	
33	Richmond Ankrah	(Ghana)	CB	22 February 2000 (aged 23)	
31	Faiz Amer	(Malaysia)	CB / RB	15 February 2003 (aged 20)	
32	Muhammad Khalil	(Malaysia)	CM / AM	11 April 2005 (aged 18)	
36	Abdul Rahman	(Syria) (Malaysia)	CM / AM	4 December 2004 (aged 19)	
66	Syahmi Adib Haikal	(Malaysia)	GK	30 March 2003 (aged 20)	

== Transfers ==
=== Transfers in ===
Date	No.	Pos.	Name	Age	Moving from	Type	Transfer fee	Team	Ref.
30 November 2022	—	MF	(Malaysia) K. Sarkunan	26	(Malaysia) Negeri Sembilan	Loan return	N/A	First team	N/A
30 November 2022	8	MF	(Malaysia) Nik Sharif	25	(Malaysia) Terengganu	Loan return	N/A	First team	N/A
18 December 2022	19	MF	(Malaysia) V. Ruventhiran	21	(Malaysia) Petaling Jaya City	Contract expired	Free transfer	First team	
20 December 2022	18	DF	(Malaysia) Khuzaimi Piee	29	(Malaysia) Negeri Sembilan	Contract expired	Free transfer	First team	
22 December 2022	7	FW	(Malaysia) Faisal Halim	24	(Malaysia) Terengganu	Contract expired	Free transfer	First team	
12 January 2023	8	MF	(Jordan) Noor Al-Rawabdeh	25	(Jordan) Al-Faisaly	Contract expired	Free transfer	First team	
20 January 2023	20	FW	(Ghana) Rauf Salifu	20	(Ghana) Accra Lions	Contract expired	Free transfer	Reserve team	
28 January 2023	70	FW	(Colombia) Ayron del Valle	34	Unattached (Note: Most recently played for Once Caldas.)	Contract expired	Free transfer	First team	
15 February 2023	16	MF	(Venezuela) Yohandry Orozco	31	(Colombia) Deportes Tolima	Contract expired	Free transfer	First team	
28 June 2023	9	FW	(Ghana) Richmond Boakye	30	Unattached (Note: Most recently played for Al Akhdar SC.)	Released (Note: Player becomes free agent after contract termination by mutual consent.)	Free transfer	First team	
13 July 2023	21	DF	(Singapore) Safuwan Baharudin	31	(Malaysia) Negeri Sembilan	Contract expired	Free transfer	First team	

=== Transfers out ===
Date	No.	Pos.	Name	Age	Moving to	Type	Transfer fee	Team	Ref.
30 November 2022	4	DF	(Malaysia) Ashmawi Yakin	28	(Malaysia) Immigration	Contract expired	Free transfer	First team	
30 November 2022	11	FW	(Ghana) George Attram	22	(Ghana) Accra Lions	End of loan	N/A	Reserve team	
30 November 2022	12	FW	(Brazil) Hyuri	31	(Brazil) Vila Nova	Contract expired	Free transfer	First team	
30 November 2022	13	DF	(Malaysia) R. Dinesh	24	(Malaysia) Sabah	Contract expired	Free transfer	First team	
30 November 2022	18	MF	(Malaysia) Halim Saari	28	(Malaysia) Kedah Darul Aman (Note: Joined Kedah Darul Aman on 1 August 2023.)	Contract expired	Free transfer	First team	
30 November 2022	19	FW	(Malaysia) Shahrel Fikri	28	(Malaysia) Negeri Sembilan	Contract expired	Free transfer	First team	
30 November 2022	21	DF	(Singapore) Safuwan Baharudin	31	(Malaysia) Negeri Sembilan	Contract expired	Free transfer	First team	
30 November 2022	32	MF	(Malaysia) Saiful Iskandar	23	(Malaysia) Malaysian University	Released (Note: Contract termination by mutual consent.)	Free transfer	Reserve team	
30 November 2022	39	MF	(Ghana) Kelvin Kyei	22	(Ghana) Accra Lions	End of loan	N/A	Reserve team	
30 November 2022	99	MF	(Jordan) Baha' Abdel-Rahman	35	(Jordan) Al-Faisaly	Contract expired	Free transfer	First team	
27 December 2022	8	MF	(Malaysia) Nik Sharif	25	(Malaysia) Terengganu	Transfer	Undisclosed	First team	
1 January 2023	—	MF	(Malaysia) K. Sarkunan	26	Free agent	Contract expired	Free transfer	First team	
10 January 2023	10	FW	(Brazil) Caion	32	(Malaysia) Kuala Lumpur City	Contract expired	Free transfer	First team	
27 May 2023	11	MF	(Malaysia) Hakim Hassan	31	(Malaysia) Terengganu	Released	Free transfer	First team	
3 October 2023	5	DF	(Jordan) Yazan Al-Arab	27	(Iraq) Al-Shorta (Note: As a free agent, player joined the club on 22 November 2023.)	Released	Free transfer	First team	

=== Loans out ===
Date	No.	Pos.	Name	Age	Loaned to	Type	On loan until	Transfer fee	Team	Ref.
29 December 2012	3	DF	(Malaysia) Azrin Afiq	22	(Malaysia) Kedah Darul Aman	Loan	End of season	N/A	First team	
17 January 2023	25	GK	(Malaysia) Sikh Izhan Nazrel	20	(Malaysia) Negeri Sembilan	Loan	End of season	N/A	First team	
27 February 2023	6	MF	(Malaysia) Zahril Azri	24	(Malaysia) Penang	Loan	End of season	N/A	First team	
1 August 2023	30	MF	(Myanmar) Hein Htet Aung	21	(Malaysia) Negeri Sembilan	Loan	End of season	N/A	First team	

== Pre-season and friendlies ==
2 February 2023 2023 Harapan Cup	Selangor (Malaysia)	0–0 (6–5 p)	(Malaysia) Kedah Darul Aman	Penang
		Report		Stadium: Penang State Stadium; Referee: Nazmi Nasaruddin
	Penalties
	Ayron (penalty scored); Noor (penalty scored); Mukhairi (penalty scored); Cheng (penalty missed); Faisal (penalty scored); Yazan (penalty scored); Htet Aung (penalty scored)		Lira (penalty scored); Hidalgo (penalty missed); Tuck (penalty scored); Juraboev (penalty scored); Ciger (penalty scored); Amirul Hisyam (penalty scored); Al-Hafiz (penalty missed)

4 February 2023 2023 Harapan Cup	Penang (Malaysia)	2–1	(Malaysia) Selangor	Penang
	Saad 74', 88'	Report	Mukhairi 24'	Stadium: Penang State Stadium; Attendance: 5,292; Referee: Nazmi Nasaruddin

== Competitions ==
=== Overall record ===
Competition	First match	Last match	Starting round	Final position	Record							
Competition	First match	Last match	Starting round	Final position	Pld	W	D	L	GF	GA	GD	Win %
Super League	26 February 2023	17 December 2023	Matchday 1	2nd	26	20	1	5	72	22	+50	76.92
FA Cup	15 April 2023	26 June 2023	Second round	Semi-finals	3	2	0	1	7	5	+2	66.67
Malaysia Cup	3 August 2023	24 September 2023	Round of 16	Quarter-finals	4	1	1	2	6	6	+0	25.00
Total					33	23	2	8	85	33	+52	69.70

Source: Soccerway

=== Super League ===
==== Table ====
Pos	Team	Pld	W	D	L	GF	GA	GD	Pts	Qualification or relegation
1	Johor Darul Ta'zim (C)	26	25	1	0	100	7	+93	76	Qualification for the AFC Champions League Elite league stage
2	Selangor	26	20	1	5	72	22	+50	61	Qualification for the AFC Champions League Two group stage (Note: Since the winners of the 2023 Malaysia FA Cup (Johor Darul Ta'zim) qualified for Asian competition based on their league positions, the berths awarded to the 2nd-placed team in the league.)
3	Sabah	26	17	3	6	64	33	+31	54	
4	Kedah Darul Aman	26	17	2	7	52	29	+23	53	
5	Sri Pahang	26	13	6	7	44	33	+11	45	

Source: MFL
Rules for classification: 1) Points; 2) Goal difference; 3) Number of goals scored.
(C) Champions

==== Results summary ====
Overall								Home						Away					
Pld	W	D	L	GF	GA	GD	Pts	W	D	L	GF	GA	GD	W	D	L	GF	GA	GD
26	20	1	5	72	22	+50	61	11	1	1	30	11	+19	9	0	4	42	11	+31

Source: Super League fixtures and results

==== Results by matchday ====
Win Draw Loss

Round	1	2	3	4	5	6	7	8	9	10	11	12	13	14	15	16	17	18	19	20	21	22	23	24	25	26
Ground	H	A	H	A	H	A	H	H	H	A	A	H	A	A	H	A	H	H	A	H	A	A	A	H	A	H
Result	W	W	D	W	L	W	W	W	W	L	W	W	L	W	W	L	W	W	L	W	W	W	W	W	W	W
Position	5	2	3	3	4	4	3	2	2	2	2	2	2	2	2	2	2	2	2	2	2	2	2	2	2	2
Points	3	6	7	10	10	13	16	19	22	22	25	28	28	31	34	34	37	40	40	43	46	49	52	55	58	61

Updated to match(es) played on 26 February 2023. Source: Super League fixtures and results
A = Away; H = Home; W = Win; D = Draw; L = Loss

==== Matches ====
The league fixtures were announced on 25 January 2023.

Win Draw Loss

26 February 2023 1	Selangor	1–0	Kelantan United	Petaling Jaya, Selangor
20:15 UTC+08:00	Al-Arab 40'; Aliff (yellow card) 78'; Danial (yellow card) 90+3'; Ayron (yellow card) 90+4'	Report (1); Report (2)	Khairu (yellow card) 19'; Latiff (yellow card) 76'	Stadium: MBPJ Stadium; Attendance: 6,701; Referee: Zamzaidi Katimin

2 March 2023 2	Kuching City	0–5	Selangor	Kuching, Sarawak
20:15 UTC+08:00	Shreen (yellow card) 29'	Report (1); Report (2)	Noor 4', 48'; Ayron 9'; Brendan 65'; Danial 73'; Sharul (yellow card) 84'	Stadium: Sarawak State Stadium; Attendance: 18,000; Referee: Noor Azriel Baharudin

5 March 2023 3	Selangor	1–1	Sri Pahang	Petaling Jaya, Selangor
17:30 UTC+08:00	Brendan 88'; Al-Arab (yellow card) 90+4'	Report (1); Report (2)	Fadhli (yellow card) 14'; Baqiuddin (yellow card) 38'; Azwan (yellow card) 55'; Brundo 74'; Sherman (yellow card) 90+4'; Zarif (yellow card) 90+5'; Agüero (yellow card) 90+7'	Stadium: MBPJ Stadium; Attendance: 8,504; Referee: Fitri Maskon

12 March 2023 4	Penang	1–2	Selangor	George Town, Penang
17:30 UTC+08:00	Vitor 87'	Report (1); Report (2)	Ayron 27'; Zikri (yellow card) 61'; Noor 89' (yellow card) 90'	Stadium: City Stadium, Penang; Attendance: 4,919; Referee: Suhaizi Shukri

17 March 2023 5	Selangor	0–4	Johor Darul Ta'zim	Petaling Jaya, Selangor
21:00 UTC+08:00	Sharul (yellow card) 22'; Zikri (yellow card) 26'; Al-Arab (yellow card) 39'	Report (1); Report (2)	Arif (yellow card) 45'; Davies (yellow card) 51'; Muñiz 55'; Diogo 66'; Forestieri 77', 82'	Stadium: MBPJ Stadium; Attendance: 14,462; Referee: Hasrol Amir

31 March 2023 6	Kuala Lumpur City	1–3	Selangor	Bandar Tun Razak, Kuala Lumpur
22:00 UTC+08:00	Tchétché 24'; Josué (yellow card) 73'	Report (1); Report (2)	Agyarkwa (yellow card) 19'; Brendan (yellow card) 25'; Ayron 32' (pen.), 54'; Faisal 41' (pen.); Cheng (yellow card) 45+1'	Stadium: Kuala Lumpur Stadium; Attendance: 4,204; Referee: Zamzaidi Katimin

4 April 2023 7	Selangor	2–1	Negeri Sembilan	Petaling Jaya, Selangor
22:00 UTC+08:00	Faisal 56'; Sharul 90+1'	Report (1); Report (2)	Tommy (yellow card) 38'; Zainal Abidin (yellow card) 45'; Goulon 45+8' (pen.); Che Rashid (yellow card) 90+3'	Stadium: MBPJ Stadium; Attendance: 5,754; Referee: Fitri Maskon

9 April 2023 8	Selangor	3–0	Kelantan	Petaling Jaya, Selangor
22:00 UTC+08:00	Ayron (yellow card) 6' (goal) 28'; Al-Arab (yellow card) 36'; Salifu 80', 90'; Ruventhiran (yellow card) 89'	Report (1); Report (2)	Gadit (yellow card) 22'	Stadium: MBPJ Stadium; Attendance: 5,761; Referee: Nazmi Nasaruddin

18 April 2023 9	Selangor	5–1	Terengganu	Petaling Jaya, Selangor
22:00 UTC+08:00	Ayron 17', 70'; Faisal 21'; Harith 40'; Ruventhiran (yellow card) 45+1'; Aliff 84'	Report (1); Report (2)	Pusic (yellow card) 20'; Mamut 61'	Stadium: MBPJ Stadium; Attendance: 5,207; Referee: Usaid Jamal

27 April 2023 (Note: The match was originally scheduled for 29 October 2023.) 10	Sabah	2–1	Selangor	Kota Kinabalu, Sabah
19:30 UTC+08:00	Rizal (yellow card) 6'; Saddil 25' (pen.); Baddrol 66'	Report (1); Report (2)	Al-Arab (yellow card) 43'; Khairul Fahmi 53' (o.g.); Fazly (yellow card) 75'; Aliff (yellow card) 90+5'	Stadium: Likas Stadium; Attendance: 14,444; Referee: Hasrol Amir
Note: Amendments are made at the request of the home team and are mutually agreed upon by both teams.

20 May 2023 11	Perak	0–4	Selangor	Ipoh, Perak
20:15 UTC+08:00	Zack (yellow card) 20'; Hadi (yellow card) 33'	Report (1); Report (2)	Ayron 41', 70'; Faisal 45+1'; Mukhairi 51'	Stadium: Perak Stadium; Attendance: 6,391; Referee: Noor Azriel Baharudin

24 May 2023 12	Selangor	3–2	Kedah Darul Aman	Petaling Jaya, Selangor
21:00 UTC+08:00	Ayron 23'; Faisal 40'; Noor 78'	Report (1); Report (2)	Juraboev 12'; Kalamullah (yellow card) 22'; Lira 28'; Akmal (yellow card) 45+3' (yellow-red card) 75'	Stadium: MBPJ Stadium; Attendance: 10,637; Referee: Nazmi Nasaruddin

3 June 2023 13	PDRM	1–0	Selangor	Petaling Jaya, Selangor
20:15 UTC+08:00	Safiee (yellow card) 41'; Suzuki 61'; Nabil (yellow card) 71'; Kyaw (yellow card) 72'; Macauley (yellow card) 89'; Fakhrul (yellow card) 90+7'	Report (1); Report (2)	Faisal (yellow card) 89'	Stadium: MBPJ Stadium; Attendance: 4,115; Referee: Zamzaidi Katimin

7 June 2023 14	Kelantan United	1–7	Selangor	Kota Bharu, Kelantan
21:00 UTC+08:00	Indra (yellow card) 8'; Devid 75' (pen.); Sharvin (yellow card) 82'	Report (1); Report (2)	Mukhairi 4'; Ayron 10', 45', 80'; Faisal 29'; Orozco 52'; Izwan 78'	Stadium: Sultan Muhammad IV Stadium; Attendance: 1,242; Referee: Khirulazuan Kidam

3 July 2023 (Note: The match was originally scheduled for 26 June 2023.) 15	Selangor	2–1	Kuching City	Petaling Jaya, Selangor
21:00 UTC+08:00	Ayron 26' (pen.); Orozco 55'; Zikri (yellow card) 78'	Report (1); Report (2)	Kamara (yellow card) 47'; Amir 89'	Stadium: MBPJ Stadium; Attendance: 5,211; Referee: Kamil Zakaria
Note: This match, originally scheduled for 26 June 2023, was rescheduled due to Selangor's involvement in the FA Cup semi-finals.

9 July 2023 16	Sri Pahang	1–0	Selangor	Kuantan, Pahang
17:15 UTC+08:00	Ingreso 50'; Syazwan (yellow card) 71'; Zarif (yellow card) 90+6'	Report (1); Report (2)		Stadium: Darul Makmur Stadium; Attendance: 7,066; Referee: Fitri Maskon

15 July 2023 17	Selangor	3–0	Penang	Petaling Jaya, Selangor
21:00 UTC+08:00	Noor 29'; Agyarkwa (yellow card) 39'; Khuzaimi (yellow card) 42'; Boakye 59'; Faisal 78'; Safuwan (yellow card) 82'	Report (1); Report (2)	Akif (yellow card) 61'	Stadium: MBPJ Stadium; Attendance: 6,245; Referee: Ahmad Zuhadi Dzulkifli

23 July 2023 (Note: The match was originally scheduled for 26 April 2023.) 18	Selangor	1–0	Sabah	Petaling Jaya, Selangor
21:00 UTC+08:00	Ayron 23'; Fazly (yellow card) 36'	Report (1); Report (2)	Darren (yellow card) 39'; Dominic (yellow card) 78'; Farhan (yellow card) 87'; Amri (yellow card) 88'	Stadium: MBPJ Stadium; Attendance: 7,421; Referee: Suhaizi Shukri
Note: Amendments are made at the request of the home team and are mutually agreed upon by both teams. On 6 July, Malaysian Football League (MFL) has updated the new date for the amendment of both teams.

29 July 2023 19	Johor Darul Ta'zim	2–0	Selangor	Iskandar Puteri, Johor
21:00 UTC+08:00	Bergson (yellow card) 35' (goal) 90+3' (pen.); Heberty 79'	Report (1); Report (2)	Sharul (yellow card) 40'; Agyarkwa (yellow card) 51'; Fazly (yellow card) 71'; Cheng (yellow card) 76'; Brendan (yellow card) 90+1'; Harith (yellow card) 90+2'	Stadium: Sultan Ibrahim Stadium; Attendance: 22,526; Referee: Fitri Maskon

8 August 2023 20	Selangor	2–0	Kuala Lumpur City	Petaling Jaya, Selangor
21:00 UTC+08:00	Harith 32'; Safuwan (yellow card) 46'; Ruventhiran (yellow card) 59'; Ayron 76'	Report (1); Report (2)	Josué (yellow card) 62'; Gallifuoco (yellow card) 90'	Stadium: MBPJ Stadium; Attendance: 7,964; Referee: Suhaizi Shukri

14 August 2023 (Note: The match was originally scheduled for 13 August 2023.) 21	Negeri Sembilan	0–4	Selangor	Seremban, Negeri Sembilan
21:00 UTC+08:00	Tommy (yellow card) 30' (yellow-red card) 82'; Goulon (yellow card) 89'	Report (1); Report (2)	Boakye 27'; Al-Arab (yellow card) 38'; Mukhairi (yellow card) 50'; Ayron 59'; Harith (yellow card) 73' (goal) 83'; Orozco 75'	Stadium: Tuanku Abdul Rahman Stadium; Attendance: 2,838; Referee: Tuan Mohd Yaasin
Note: On 27 July, Malaysian Football League (MFL) has updated the new date for the amendment of both teams.

25 August 2023 22	Kelantan	2–11	Selangor	Kota Bharu, Kelantan
21:00 UTC+08:00	Siringoringo 5' (pen.); Fazrul 14'	Report (1); Report (2)	Agyarkwa (yellow card) 14'; Orozco 28'; Sharul 32'; Ayron 41', 44', 63', 87'; Boakye 48', 78', 86'; Faisal 50', 53'	Stadium: Sultan Muhammad IV Stadium; Attendance: 1,002; Referee: Nazmi Nasaruddin

29 September 2023 23	Terengganu	0–4	Selangor	Kuala Nerus, Terengganu
21:00 UTC+08:00		Report (1); Report (2)	Orozco 26', 41'; Faisal 52'; Aliff 81'; Harith (yellow card) 86'	Stadium: Sultan Mizan Zainal Abidin Stadium; Attendance: 7,456; Referee: Ahmad Zuhadi Dzulkifli

25 November 2023 24	Selangor	4–0	Perak	Petaling Jaya, Selangor
17:30 UTC+08:00	Sharul 3'; Faisal (yellow card) 31'; Mukhairi 33'; Fazly (yellow card) 48'; Orozco 73'; Ayron 80'; Zikri (yellow card) 90+4'	Report (1); Report (2)	Fadhil (yellow card) 26'	Stadium: MBPJ Stadium; Attendance: 9,069; Referee: Ahmad Zuhadi Dzulkifli

2 December 2023 25	Kedah Darul Aman	0–1	Selangor	Alor Setar, Kedah
21:00 UTC+08:00		Report (1); Report (2)	Ayron 64'; Agyarkwa (yellow card) 70'; Somerville (yellow card) 90'	Stadium: Darulaman Stadium; Attendance: 20,864; Referee: Fitri Maskon

17 December 2023 26	Selangor	3–1	PDRM	Petaling Jaya, Selangor
21:00 UTC+08:00	Faisal 36' (pen.); Brendan 45'; Zikri (yellow card) 50'; Boakye 88'	Report (1); Report (2)	Iqmal (yellow card) 15'; Awad 71'	Stadium: MBPJ Stadium; Attendance: 10,737; Referee: Suhaizi Shukri

==== Results overview ====
Win Draw Loss

Team	Home score	Away score	Double
Johor Darul Ta'zim	0–4	0–2	0–6
Kedah Darul Aman	3–2	1–0	4–2
Kelantan	3–0	11–2	14–2
Kelantan United	1–0	7–1	8–1
Kuching City	2–1	5–0	7–1
Kuala Lumpur City	2–0	3–1	5–1
Negeri Sembilan	2–1	4–0	6–1
Penang	3–0	2–1	5–1
Perak	4–0	4–0	8–0
PDRM	3–1	0–1	3–2
Sabah	1–0	1–2	2–2
Sri Pahang	1–1	0–1	1–2
Terengganu	5–1	4–0	9–1

=== FA Cup ===
15 April 2023 Second round	Selangor	4–0	Sri Pahang	Petaling Jaya, Selangor
22:00 UTC+08:00	Mukhairi 41', 59' (yellow card) 62'; Cheng (yellow card) 47'; Faisal 67'; Brendan 72'	Report (1); Report (2)	Baqiuddin (yellow card) 38'; Azwan (yellow card) 62'	Stadium: MBPJ Stadium; Attendance: 5,106; Referee: Ahmad Zuhadi Dzulkifli

27 May 2023 Quarter-finals	Negeri Sembilan	1–3	Selangor	Seremban, Negeri Sembilan
20:15 UTC+08:00	Safuwan 1'; Nasrullah (yellow card) 78'	Report (1); Report (2)	Mukhairi 3'; Orozco 60', 87'	Stadium: Tuanku Abdul Rahman Stadium; Attendance: 6,203; Referee: Suhaizi Shukri

26 June 2023 Semi-finals	Johor Darul Ta'zim	4–0	Selangor	Iskandar Puteri, Johor
20:15 UTC+08:00	Arif Aiman 20', 33', 38' (yellow card) 27'; Forestieri 47'	Report (1); Report (2)	Al-Arab (yellow card) 7'; Khuzaimi (yellow card) 48'; Mukhairi (yellow card) 49'; Brendan (yellow card) 80'	Stadium: Sultan Ibrahim Stadium; Attendance: 32,257; Referee: Hasrol Amir

=== Malaysia Cup ===
==== Round of 16 ====
3 August 2023 First leg	PDRM	1–4	Selangor	Petaling Jaya, Selangor
21:00 UTC+08:00	Hadi 25'; Awad (yellow card) 60'; Amir (yellow card) 67'	Report (1); Report (2)	Fazly (yellow card) 54'; Ayron 57', 64'; Harith 74'; Aliff (yellow card) 88'; Orozco 90+1'	Stadium: MBPJ Stadium; Attendance: 2,100; Referee: Nafeez Abd Wahab

19 August 2023 Second leg	Selangor	1–2 (5–3 agg.)	PDRM	Petaling Jaya, Selangor
17:30 UTC+08:00	Orozco 25'; Fazly (yellow card) 48'; Cheng (yellow card) 49'; Boakye (yellow card) 79'	Report (1); Report (2)	Nabil 32'; Aliff (yellow card) 58'; Macauley (yellow card) 72'; Okwuosa (yellow card) 74'; Alif (yellow card) 76'; Harith 90+3' (o.g.)	Stadium: MBPJ Stadium; Attendance: 7,041; Referee: Abang Azharudin Abdullah

==== Quarter-finals ====
16 September 2023 First leg	Terengganu	2–0	Selangor	Kuala Nerus, Terengganu
21:00 UTC+08:00	Tukhtasinov (yellow card) 22'; Mamut 45+2' (pen.) (yellow card) 45+2'; Syahmi 90+4'	Report (1); Report (2)	Khuzaimi (yellow card) 36'	Stadium: Sultan Mizan Zainal Abidin Stadium; Attendance: 13,118; Referee: Fitri Maskon

24 September 2023 Second leg	Selangor	1–1 (1–3 agg.)	Terengganu	Petaling Jaya, Selangor
21:00 UTC+08:00	Noor (yellow card) 64'; Safuwan 69'; Al-Arab (red card) 90+5'	Report (1); Report (2)	Mamut 23' (pen.); Suhaimi (yellow card) 84'; Safwan (yellow card) 90'	Stadium: MBPJ Stadium; Attendance: 10,743; Referee: Hasrol Amir

== Statistics ==
=== Squad statistics ===
As of 17 December 2023

Appearances (Apps.) numbers are for appearances in competitive games only including sub appearances.
Red card numbers denote: Numbers in parentheses represent red cards overturned for wrongful dismissal.

No.	Nat.	Player	Pos.	Super League				FA Cup				Malaysia Cup				Total			
No.	Nat.	Player	Pos.	Apps	Goal	Yellow card	Red card	Apps	Goal	Yellow card	Red card	Apps	Goal	Yellow card	Red card	Apps	Goal	Yellow card	Red card
1	(Malaysia)	Khairulazhan	GK	14				3								17			
2	(Malaysia)	Quentin Cheng	DF	22		2		3		1		4		1		29		4	
5	(Jordan)	Yazan Al-Arab†	DF	16	1	5		3		1		3			1	22	1	6	1
7	(Malaysia)	Faisal Halim	FW	23	11	2		3	1			2				28	12	2	
8	(Jordan)	Noor Al-Rawabdeh	MF	22	5	1		2				4		1		28	5	2	
9	(Ghana)	Richmond Boakye	FW	11	6							4		1		15	6	1	
10	(Malaysia)	Mukhairi Ajmal	MF	24	3	1		3	3	2		4				31	6	3	
11	(Malaysia)	Hakim Hassan†	MF	4				1								5			
14	(Malaysia)	Zikri Khalili	DF	12		5		2								14		5	
16	(Venezuela)	Yohandry Orozco	MF	24	7			3	2			4	2			31	11		
17	(Malaysia)	Danial Asri	FW	10	1	1						1				11	1	1	
18	(Malaysia)	Khuzaimi Piee	DF	11		1		3		1		2		1		16		3	
19	(Malaysia)	V. Ruventhiran	DF	10		3		1				2				13		3	
20	(Ghana)	Rauf Salifu	FW	5	2			1								6	2		
21	(Singapore)	Safuwan Baharudin	DF	8		2						3	1			11	1	2	
22	(Malaysia)	Fazly Mazlan	DF	20		4		2				3		2		25		6	
23	(Malaysia)	Sam Somerville	GK	13		1						4				17		1	
24	(Ghana)	Alex Agyarkwa	MF	18		5		2				1				21		5	
30	(Myanmar)	Hein Htet Aung†	MF	12				2								14			
31	(Malaysia)	Faiz Amer	DF	1												1			
32	(Malaysia)	Muhammad Khalil	MF	1												1			
33	(Ghana)	Richmond Ankrah	DF	4												4			
36	(Malaysia)	Abdul Rahman	MF									1				1			
43	(Malaysia)	Syahir Bashah	MF	4				2								6			
44	(Malaysia)	Sharul Nazeem	DF	21	3	3		1				3				25	3	3	
55	(Malaysia)	Harith Haiqal	DF	11	3	3		2				3	1			16	4	3	
70	(Colombia)	Ayron del Valle	FW	26	23	2		3				4	2			33	25	2	
76	(Malaysia)	Aliff Izwan	MF	9	2	1						1				10	2	1	
77	(Malaysia)	Aliff Haiqal	MF	22	1	1		2				3		1		27	1	2	
88	(Malaysia)	Brendan Gan	MF	23	3	2		2	1	1		4				29	4	3	
Own goals					1				0				0				1		
Totals					72	45	0		7	6	0		6	7	1		85	58	1

† Player left the club during the season.

=== Goalscorers ===
Includes all competitive matches.

As of match played 17 December 2023

Rank	Pos.	No.	Player	Super League	FA Cup	Malaysia Cup	Total
1	FW	70	(Colombia) Ayron del Valle	23	0	2	25
2	FW	7	(Malaysia) Faisal Halim	11	1	0	12
3	MF	16	(Venezuela) Yohandry Orozco	7	2	2	11
4	FW	9	(Ghana) Richmond Boakye	6	0	0	6
4	MF	10	(Malaysia) Mukhairi Ajmal	3	3	0	6
6	MF	8	(Jordan) Noor Al-Rawabdeh	5	0	0	5
7	DF	55	(Malaysia) Harith Haiqal	3	0	1	4
7	MF	88	(Malaysia) Brendan Gan	3	1	0	4
9	DF	44	(Malaysia) Sharul Nazeem	3	0	0	3
10	FW	20	(Ghana) Rauf Salifu	2	0	0	2
10	FW	76	(Malaysia) Aliff Izwan	2	0	0	2
12	DF	5	(Jordan) Yazan Al-Arab†	1	0	0	1
12	FW	17	(Malaysia) Danial Asri	1	0	0	1
12	DF	21	(Singapore) Safuwan Baharudin	0	0	1	1
12	MF	77	(Malaysia) Aliff Haiqal	1	0	0	1
Own Goals				1	0	0	1
TOTALS				72	7	6	85
Own Goals Conceded
1	DF	55	(Malaysia) Harith Haiqal	0	0	1	1
TOTALS				0	0	1	1

† Player left the club during the season.

=== Top assists ===
Rnk	Pos	No.	Player	Super League	FA Cup	Malaysia Cup	Total
1	MF	16	(Venezuela) Yohandry Orozco	10	1	1	12
2	FW	7	(Malaysia) Faisal Halim	9	1	1	11
3	MF	88	(Malaysia) Brendan Gan	9	0	0	9
4	FW	70	(Colombia) Ayron del Valle	5	1	0	6
5	DF	2	(Malaysia) Quentin Cheng	3	1	0	4
5	MF	10	(Malaysia) Mukhairi Ajmal	4	0	0	4
5	MF	24	(Ghana) Alex Agyarkwa	3	1	0	4
8	MF	8	(Jordan) Noor Al-Rawabdeh	2	0	1	3
8	FW	9	(Ghana) Richmond Boakye	3	0	0	3
10	FW	30	(Myanmar) Hein Htet Aung†	2	0	0	2
11	DF	5	(Jordan) Yazan Al-Arab†	1	0	0	1
11	MF	11	(Malaysia) Hakim Hassan†	1	0	0	1
11	DF	14	(Malaysia) Zikri Khalili	1	0	0	1
11	DF	22	(Malaysia) Fazly Mazlan	0	0	1	1
11	MF	77	(Malaysia) Aliff Haiqal	1	0	0	1
TOTALS				54	5	4	63

† Player left the club during the season.

=== Clean sheets ===
Rnk	No.	Player	Super League	FA Cup	Malaysia Cup	Total
1	23	(Malaysia) Sam Somerville	7	0	0	7
2	1	(Malaysia) Khairulazhan	4	1	0	5
TOTALS			11	1	0	12

=== Disciplinary record ===
As of match played 17 December 2023

Includes all competitive matches. The list is sorted alphabetically by surname when total cards are equal.

Rank	No.	Pos.	Player	Super League			FA Cup			Malaysia Cup			Total		
Rank	No.	Pos.	Player	Yellow card	(yellow card) (yellow-red card)	Red card	Yellow card	(yellow card) (yellow-red card)	Red card	Yellow card	(yellow card) (yellow-red card)	Red card	Yellow card	(yellow card) (yellow-red card)	Red card
1	5	DF	(Jordan) Yazan Al-Arab†	5	-	-	1	-	-	-	-	1	6	-	1
1	22	DF	(Malaysia) Fazly Mazlan	4	-	-	-	-	-	2	-	-	6	-	-
3	14	DF	(Malaysia) Zikri Khalili	5	-	-	-	-	-	-	-	-	5	-	-
3	24	MF	(Ghana) Alex Agyarkwa	5	-	-	-	-	-	-	-	-	5	-	-
5	2	DF	(Malaysia) Quentin Cheng	2	-	-	1	-	-	1	-	-	4	-	-
6	10	MF	(Malaysia) Mukhairi Ajmal	1	-	-	2	-	-	-	-	-	3	-	-
6	18	DF	(Malaysia) Khuzaimi Piee	1	-	-	1	-	-	1	-	-	3	-	-
6	19	DF	(Malaysia) V. Ruventhiran	3	-	-	-	-	-	-	-	-	3	-	-
6	44	DF	(Malaysia) Sharul Nazeem	3	-	-	-	-	-	-	-	-	3	-	-
6	55	DF	(Malaysia) Harith Haiqal	3	-	-	-	-	-	-	-	-	3	-	-
6	88	MF	(Malaysia) Brendan Gan	2	-	-	1	-	-	-	-	-	3	-	-
12	7	FW	(Malaysia) Faisal Halim	2	-	-	-	-	-	-	-	-	2	-	-
12	8	MF	(Jordan) Noor Al-Rawabdeh	1	-	-	-	-	-	1	-	-	2	-	-
12	21	DF	(Singapore) Safuwan Baharudin	2	-	-	-	-	-	-	-	-	2	-	-
12	70	FW	(Colombia) Ayron del Valle	2	-	-	-	-	-	-	-	-	2	-	-
12	77	MF	(Malaysia) Aliff Haiqal	1	-	-	-	-	-	1	-	-	2	-	-
17	9	FW	(Ghana) Richmond Boakye	-	-	-	-	-	-	1	-	-	1	-	-
17	17	FW	(Malaysia) Danial Asri	1	-	-	-	-	-	-	-	-	1	-	-
17	23	GK	(Malaysia) Sam Somerville	1	-	-	-	-	-	-	-	-	1	-	-
17	76	MF	(Malaysia) Aliff Izwan	1	-	-	-	-	-	-	-	-	1	-	-
Total				45	0	0	6	0	0	7	0	1	58	0	1

† Player left the club during the season.

=== Hat-tricks ===
Player	Against	Result	Date	Competition	Ref
(Colombia) Ayron del Valle	Kelantan United (A)	7–1	7 June 2023	Super League	
(Colombia) Ayron del Valle	Kelantan (A)^{4} (Note: Ayron del Valle scored four goals.)	11–2	25 August 2023	Super League	
(Ghana) Richmond Boakye	Kelantan (A)^{4}	11–2	25 August 2023	Super League	

^{4} – Player scored four goals.

^{5} – Player scored five goals.
