= 2020 Selangor F.C. II season =

Selangor II
2020 season
- Chairman: Tengku Amir Shah
- Head coach: Michael Feichtenbeiner (until 16 November 2020); Rusdi Suparman
- Stadium: UiTM Stadium; KLFA Stadium; MBPJ Stadium
- Malaysia Premier League: 7th
- Top goalscorer: Danial Asri (7)
- Highest home attendance: 0
- Lowest home attendance: 0
- Average home league attendance: 0

Selangor F.C. II played the 2020 season in the Malaysia Premier League.

== Review and events ==
16 December 2019, Michael Feichtenbeiner has been appointed as the club's head coach.

Quentin Cheng joined the club from Sutherland Sharks.

On 26 February 2020, the club announced several players from Mokhtar Dahari Academy has signed contract with the club.

On 4 July 2020, Football Association of Selangor announced Luqman Hakim set to join Belgian side K.V. Kortrijk.

In September 2020, Rusdi Suparman has been appointed as club's new head coach after Michael Feichtenbeiner has been redesignated as Selangor's head coach.

== Competitions ==
=== Malaysia Premier League ===
==== League table ====
Pos	Team	Pld	W	D	L	GF	GA	GD	Pts	Qualification or relegation
5	Johor Darul Ta'zim II (Note: Johor Darul Ta'zim II, Perak II, Selangor II and Terengganu II cannot be promoted from Malaysia Premier League and play in Malaysia Cup as Johor Darul Ta'zim F.C., Perak FA, Selangor F.C. and Terengganu FC (their parent clubs) remain in Malaysia Super League and play in Malaysia Cup. Should the team be relegated to Malaysia Premier League or will not play in Malaysia Cup, Johor Darul Ta'zim II, Perak II, Selangor II and Terengganu II will have to drop to Malaysia M3 League or will play in Malaysia Cup.)	11	4	3	4	20	17	+3	15	
6	Kelantan	11	5	3	3	14	11	+3	15 (Note: Kelantan have been docked three points following the club’s failure to comply with FIFA’s decision.)	
7	Selangor II	11	4	1	6	17	23	−6	13	
8	Kelantan United	11	4	0	7	13	19	−6	12	
9	UKM	11	3	3	5	11	17	−6	12	Withrew from Premier League and dissolved.

Updated to match(es) played on 31 October 2020. Source: MFL
Rules for classification: 1) Points; 2) Goal difference; 3) Number of goals scored.

== Statistics ==
As of match played 9 October 2020

=== Appearances and goals ===
No.	Pos	Nat	Player	Total		League	
No.	Pos	Nat	Player	Apps	Goals	Apps	Goals
1	GK	(Malaysia) MAS	Aqil Fadhly	2	0	2	0
2	DF	(Malaysia) MAS	Shivan Pillay	9	0	9	0
3	DF	(Malaysia) MAS	Azrin Afiq	5	0	2+3	0
4	DF	(Malaysia) MAS	Sharul Nazeem	11	0	11	0
5	DF	(Malaysia) MAS	Harith Haiqal	10	0	7+3	0
7	MF	(Malaysia) MAS	Sharvin Selvakumaran	1	0	1	0
8	MF	(Malaysia) MAS	Saravanan Thirumurugan	8	0	5+3	0
9	FW	(Malaysia) MAS	Azizul Baharuddin	1	0	0+1	0
10	MF	(Kosovo) KOS	Bajram Nebihi	9	5	8+1	5
11	MF	(Malaysia) MAS	Danial Asri	11	7	10+1	7
13	GK	(Malaysia) MAS	Firdaus Irman	5	0	5	0
17	DF	(Malaysia) MAS	Khairul Naim	1	0	1	0
19	MF	(Malaysia) MAS	Mior Dani Armin	1	0	0+1	0
20	MF	(Malaysia) MAS	Ashraf Nasir	9	0	2+7	0
21	MF	(Malaysia) MAS	Fazrul Fahriz	8	1	6+2	1
22	DF	(Malaysia) MAS	Raja Imran Shah	0	0	0	0
23	GK	(Malaysia) MAS	Haziq Ridwan	0	0	0	0
24	MF	(Malaysia) MAS	Faizzudin Abidin	0	0	0	0
26	DF	(Malaysia) MAS	Aidil Azuan	8	0	8	0
27	DF	(Malaysia) MAS	Amir Ashyraf	0	0	0	0
28	MF	(Malaysia) MAS	Syazwan Salihin	7	1	7	1
29	MF	(Malaysia) MAS	Mukhairi Ajmal	4	0	1+3	0
31	GK	(Malaysia) MAS	Sikh Izhan	4	0	4	0
32	GK	(Malaysia) MAS	Fawzal Muthalib	0	0	0	0
33	DF	(Malaysia) MAS	Iqmal Ramlan	6	0	5+1	0
34	DF	(Malaysia) MAS	Zikri Khalili	10	0	9+1	0
39	FW	(Malaysia) MAS	Nazrin Nasir	1	0	0+1	0
44	MF	(Malaysia) MAS	Devesshraja Sathianoorthy	3	0	2+1	0
51	DF	(Malaysia) MAS	Anwar Ibrahim	1	0	0+1	0
53	MF	(Malaysia) MAS	Zahril Azri	4	0	3+1	0
55	MF	(Malaysia) MAS	Shafizi Iqmal	0	0	0	0
61	GK	(Malaysia) MAS	Arif Izwan	0	0	0	0
62	MF	(Malaysia) MAS	Hafizuddin Zuki	0	0	0	0
63	DF	(Malaysia) MAS	Ikhwan Hafiz	0	0	0	0
66	DF	(Malaysia) MAS	Quentin Cheng	11	2	9+2	2
67	DF	(Malaysia) MAS	Wan Zulhairil Husin	0	0	0	0
69	MF	(Malaysia) MAS	Aliff Haiqal	4	1	4	1
77	FW	(Malaysia) MAS	Luqman Hakim	0	0	0	0
88	MF	(Singapore) SGP	Armin Maier	1	0	0+1	0
99	MF	(Malaysia) MAS	Ikhwan Hafizo	5	0	0+5	0
