= Rauf Salifu =

Ghanaian footballer

Personal information
- Full name: Rauf Salifu
- Date of birth: 23 April 2002 (age 24)
- Place of birth: Accra, Ghana
- Height: 1.76 m (5 ft 9 in)
- Position: Striker

Youth career
- 2018–2022: Accra Lions

Senior career*
Years	Team	Apps	(Gls)
2020–2022	Accra Lions	28	(21)
2022	→ Sporting Kansas City II (loan)	17	(6)
2023	Selangor	5	(2)
- * Club domestic league appearances and goals as of May 20, 2023

Rauf Salifu (born 23 April 2002) is a Ghanaian professional footballer who plays as a striker.

== Club career ==
=== Accra Lions ===
Born in Accra, Salifu played for Accra Lions in his homeland. He was part of the club to win the title in the 2020–21 Ghana Division One and ended up as top scorer the seasons Division One with 21 goals. Also, Salifu helped the club earn promotion to the Ghana Premier League next season. After that, he received interest from clubs in Belgium, Turkey, Spain, and the Middle East.

=== Sporting Kansas City II ===
On 7 February 2022, Salifu moving abroad to United States and joining Sporting Kansas City II on loan. He made his debut on 28 March with playing 58 minutes of the 1–1 away draw against Colorado Rapids II. He scored his first goal later on 5 June 2022, however, his side lose point in the match against Minnesota United II. On 3 July 2022, Salifu was named Man of the Match when he scored all four goals in a tight match against North Texas at home, which ended 4–2 with his club emerging victorious. It was the first time Salifu had scored four goals in one match in his entire career. Overall, he scored 6 goals and provided one assist in 17 appearances for the club.

=== Selangor ===
On 20 January 2023, Salifu was signed by Malaysia Super League club Selangor on a permanent deal. Salifu made his debut for his new club in a 5–0 away win against Kuching City where he came on as a substitute for Ayron del Valle in the league match on 2 March. Later, he scored his first goal for the club against Kelantan at MBPJ Stadium on 9 April, and scored two goals to help Selangor to a 3–0 win. He ended the season with two goals in 6 overall appearances with the club.

== Career statistics ==
=== Club ===
As of 17 December 2023

Club	Season	League			Cup		League Cup		Continental		Total	
Club	Season	Division	Apps	Goals	Apps	Goals	Apps	Goals	Apps	Goals	Apps	Goals
Accra Lions	2020–21	Ghana Division One	28	21	—		—		—		28	21
Sporting Kansas City II (loan)	2022	MLS Next Pro	17	6	—		—		—		17	6
Sporting Kansas City II (loan)	Total		45	27	0	0	0	0	0	0	45	27
Selangor	2023	Malaysia Super League	5	2	1	0	0	0	—		6	2
Selangor	Total		5	2	1	0	0	0	0	0	6	2
Career total			50	29	1	0	0	0	0	0	51	29

== Honours ==
Accra Lions

- Ghana Division One: 2020–2021
