= 2022 Selangor F.C. season =

2022 season of Malaysian association football club

Selangor
2022 season
- Chairman: Tengku Amir Shah
- Manager: Mahfizul Rusydin
- Head coach: Michael Feichtenbeiner (until 9 August); Nidzam Jamil (caretaker, from 9 August to 24 September); Tan Cheng Hoe (from 24 September)
- Stadium: MBPJ Stadium
- Super League: 5th
- FA Cup: Semi-finals
- Malaysia Cup: Runners-up
- Top goalscorer: League: (14 goals); Caion; All: (24 goals); Caion
- Highest home attendance: 14,554; Malaysia Cup; Selangor vs Terengganu (16 November 2022)
- Lowest home attendance: 680; Super League; Selangor vs Petaling Jaya City (21 August 2022)
- Average home league attendance: 2,238
- Biggest win: Super League; 7–0 v Sarawak United (H) (19 June 2022)
- Biggest defeat: Super League; 1–5 v Johor Darul Ta'zim (A) (24 June 2022)
Home colours	Away colours	Third colours

The 2022 season was Selangor's 17th season in the Super League and their 37th consecutive season in the top flight of Malaysia football. The club also participates in the Malaysia Cup and will also participate in the FA Cup. Following the rebuilding of Shah Alam Stadium, Selangor played all home fixtures at MBPJ Stadium during this season.

== Review ==
For 2022 season, Selangor make a change management with recruit Michael Feichtenbeiner as a new coach for the club, with Karsten Neitzel will remain at the club and continue to be an important part of the coaching team for 2022 season as the First Team Assistant Head Coach. Former Selangor player, Nidzam Jamil return to the club and also will become First Team Assistant Head Coach alongside Neitzel.

On 9 August 2022, it was announced that coach Feichtenbeiner had left his role by mutual consent and that Nidzam Jamil had replaced him as caretaker coach, after starting the 2022 season he left the worst record season with just collect four wins in the first 13 Super League games, leaving Selangor 19 points behind the league leaders.

On 24 September 2022, Selangor appointed the former Malaysia national football team coach, Tan Cheng Hoe as the new Head Coach of the Red Giants first team to allow him to start preparing early and plan for next season.

After finish 5th in the league, Selangor qualified to enter the 2022 Malaysia Cup in the knockout stage, after The Malaysian Football League (MFL) announced that there will be no group stage action for the tournament where all teams will be drawn to start the challenge in the round of 16.

At the end of the season, Selangor with achievement finished their league campaign in the fifth (5th) position, reach the semi-final FA Cup and become runner-up in Malaysia Cup.

== Squad information ==
=== First-team squad ===
Squad No.	Name	Nationality	Position(s)	Date of birth (age)	Noted
Goalkeepers
1	Khairulazhan Khalid	(Malaysia)	GK	7 November 1989 (aged 33)	
23	Sam Somerville	(Malaysia)	GK	6 August 1994 (aged 28)	
25	Sikh Izhan Nazrel	(Malaysia)	GK	23 March 2002 (aged 20)	(Note: Promoted from Reserve Team.)
Defenders
2	Quentin Cheng	(Australia) (Malaysia)	RB / RWB	20 November 1999 (aged 23)	
3	Azrin Afiq	(Malaysia)	LB / LM / CB	2 January 2000 (aged 22)	(Note: Promoted from Reserve Team.)
4	Ashmawi Yakin	(Malaysia)	CB / RB / LB	1 January 1994 (aged 28)	
5	Yazan Al-Arab	(Jordan)	CB	31 January 1996 (aged 26)	
13	R. Dinesh	(Malaysia)	LB	13 February 1998 (aged 24)	
14	Zikri Khalili	(Malaysia)	LB	25 June 2002 (aged 20)	(Note: Promoted from Reserve Team.)
21	Safuwan Baharudin (VC)	(Singapore)	CB / DM / CM	22 September 1991 (aged 31)	
22	Fazly Mazlan	(Malaysia)	LB / LWB	22 December 1993 (aged 28)	
44	Sharul Nazeem	(Malaysia)	CB	16 November 1999 (aged 23)	
55	Harith Haiqal	(Malaysia)	CB / DM	22 June 2002 (aged 20)	(Note: Promoted from Reserve Team.)
Midfielders
6	Zahril Azri	(Malaysia)	CM / DM	4 February 1999 (aged 23)	
7	Mukhairi Ajmal	(Malaysia)	CM / DM	7 November 2001 (aged 21)	
9	Hakim Hassan	(Malaysia)	LM / LW / AM	2 October 1991 (aged 31)	
18	Halim Saari	(Malaysia)	DM / CM	14 November 1994 (aged 28)	
43	Syahir Bashah	(Malaysia)	LM / RM / AM / CM	16 September 2001 (aged 21)	
77	Aliff Haiqal	(Malaysia)	CM / LM / RM	11 July 2000 (aged 22)	
88	Brendan Gan (C)	(Malaysia) (Australia)	CM / DM	3 June 1988 (aged 34)	
99	Baha' Abdel-Rahman	(Jordan)	CM / DM	5 January 1987 (aged 35)	
Forwards
10	Caion	(Brazil)	ST / LW / RW	5 October 1990 (aged 32)	
12	Hyuri	(Brazil)	ST / LW / RW	26 September 1991 (aged 31)	
17	Danial Asri	(Malaysia)	LW / LM / CF	1 April 2000 (aged 22)	
19	Shahrel Fikri	(Malaysia)	ST / LW / RW	17 October 1994 (aged 28)	
Out on loan
6	K. Sarkunan	(Malaysia)	CM / DM	4 August 1996 (aged 26)	
8	Nik Sharif	(Malaysia)	LM / RM / AM / CM	30 May 1997 (aged 25)	

=== Reserve Team Squad ===
Squad No.	Name	Nationality	Position(s)	Date of birth (age)	Noted
Selangor II, III & IV
11	George Attram	(Ghana)	ST / CF	9 September 2000 (aged 22)	(Note: On loan from Accra Lions.)
24	Alex Agyarkwa	(Ghana)	CM	18 July 2000 (aged 22)	
30	Hein Htet Aung	(Myanmar)	RW / LW	5 October 2001 (aged 21)	
32	Saiful Iskandar	(Malaysia)	DM / CM	29 March 1999 (aged 23)	
33	Richmond Ankrah	(Ghana)	CB	22 February 2000 (aged 22)	
35	Abdul Rahman	(Syria) (Malaysia)	CM / AM	4 December 2004 (aged 17)	
36	Aliff Izwan	(Malaysia)	CM / AM	2 October 2004 (aged 18)	
39	Kelvin Kyei	(Ghana)	RM / RW	5 February 2000 (aged 22)	
66	Syahmi Adib Haikal	(Malaysia)	GK	30 March 2003 (aged 19)	

== Transfers ==
=== Transfers in ===
Date	No.	Pos.	Name	Age	Moving from	Type	Transfer fee	Team	Ref.
30 November 2021	2	DF	(Australia) (Malaysia) Quentin Cheng	22	(Malaysia) Penang	Loan return	N/A	First team	N/A
30 November 2021	3	DF	(Malaysia) Rodney Celvin	25	(Malaysia) Kedah Darul Aman	Loan return	N/A	First team	N/A
17 December 2021	23	GK	(Malaysia) Samuel Somerville	27	(Malaysia) Penang	Contract expired	Free transfer	First team	
18 December 2021	5	DF	(Jordan) Yazan Al-Arab	25	(Jordan) Al-Wehdat	Contract expired	Free transfer	First team	
24 December 2021	99	MF	(Jordan) Baha' Abdel-Rahman	34	(Jordan) Sahab	Contract expired	Free transfer	First team	
25 December 2021	6	MF	(Malaysia) Zahril Azri	22	(Malaysia) Sarawak United	Contract expired	Free transfer	First team	
26 December 2021	22	DF	(Malaysia) Fazly Mazlan	28	(Malaysia) Johor Darul Ta'zim	Contract expired	Free transfer	First team	
27 December 2021	10	FW	(Brazil) Caion	31	(Thailand) Muangkan United	Contract expired	Free transfer	First team	
30 December 2021	43	MF	(Malaysia) Syahir Bashah	20	(Malaysia) Perak	Contract expired	Free transfer	First team	
1 January 2022	24	MF	(Ghana) Alex Agyarkwa	21	(Ghana) Accra Lions	Contract expired	Free transfer	Reserve team	
1 February 2022	12	FW	(Brazil) Hyuri	30	(United Arab Emirates) Hatta Club	Contract expired	Free transfer	First team	
23 March 2022	33	DF	(Ghana) Richmond Ankrah	22	(Ghana) Accra Lions	Transfer	Undisclosed	Reserve team	

=== Loans in ===
Date	No.	Pos.	Name	Age	Loaned from	Type	On loan until	Transfer fee	Team	Ref.
27 June 2022	39	FW	(Ghana) Kelvin Kyei	22	(Ghana) Accra Lions	Loan	End of season	Free transfer	Reserve team	

=== Transfers out ===
Date	No.	Pos.	Name	Age	Moving to	Type	Transfer fee	Team	Ref.
25 November 2021	20	DF	(Malaysia) Syahmi Safari	23	(Malaysia) Johor Darul Ta'zim	Contract termination (Note: Termination by mutual consent.)	Undisclosed	First team	
30 November 2021	5	MF	(Germany) Manuel Konrad	33	(Germany) Sonnenhof Großaspach	Contract expired	Free transfer	First team	
30 November 2021	7	FW	(Malaysia) Sean Selvaraj	25	(Malaysia) Negeri Sembilan	Contract expired	Free transfer	First team	
30 November 2021	11	MF	(Malaysia) Wan Zack Haikal	30	(Malaysia) Perak	Contract expired	Free transfer	First team	
30 November 2021	12	FW	(Bahrain) Ifedayo Olusegun	30	(Malaysia) Melaka United	Contract expired	Free transfer	First team	
30 November 2021	22	GK	(Malaysia) Tauffiq Ar Rasyid	25	(Malaysia) Sarawak United	Contract expired	Free transfer	First team	
30 November 2021	23	MF	(Switzerland) Oliver Buff	29	(Lithuania) Žalgiris	Contract expired	Free transfer	First team	
30 November 2021	26	DF	(Malaysia) A. Namathevan	25	(Malaysia) Negeri Sembilan	Contract expired	Free transfer	First team	
30 November 2021	35	DF	(Malaysia) Shivan Pillay	20	(Malaysia) Petaling Jaya City	Contract expired	Free transfer	Reserve team	
30 November 2021	38	DF	(Malaysia) Aidil Azuan	20	(Malaysia) Penang	Contract expired	Free transfer	Reserve team	
29 December 2021	31	DF	(Germany) Tim Heubach	33	Retired	Contract termination (Note: Termination by mutual consent. The player also announced the retirement after depart from the club.)	N/A	First team	
1 January 2022	—	FW	(Malaysia) Azizul Baharuddin	23	Free agent	Contract expired	Free transfer	Reserve Team	
2 January 2022	3	DF	(Malaysia) Rodney Celvin	25	(Malaysia) Kedah Darul Aman	Contract termination	Undisclosed	First team	
2 March 2022	33	DF	(Ghana) Jordan Ayimbila	21	(United States) San Antonio	End of loan	N/A	Reserve team	

=== Loans out ===
Date	No.	Pos.	Name	Age	Loaned to	Type	On loan until	Transfer fee	Team	Source
15 December 2021	6	MF	(Malaysia) K. Sarkunan	25	(Malaysia) Negeri Sembilan	Loan	End of season	N/A	First team	
30 May 2022	8	MF	(Malaysia) Nik Sharif	25	(Malaysia) Terengganu	Loan	End of season	N/A	First team	

== Pre-season and friendlies ==
6 February 2022 Friendly	Selangor (Malaysia)	3–1	(Malaysia) Kelantan	Shah Alam, Selangor
21:00 UTC+08:00	Shahrel 43'; Hyuri 54'; Cheng 63'	Report	Nurshamil 36'	Stadium: UiTM Stadium

20 February 2022 Friendly	Selangor (Malaysia)	0–2	(Malaysia) Terengganu	Petaling Jaya, Selangor
20:45 UTC+08:00		Report	Mintah 4'; Faisal 24'	Stadium: MBPJ Stadium

25 February 2022 TYT Cup	Melaka United (Malaysia)	3–3 (4–3 p)	(Malaysia) Selangor	Krubong, Malacca
21:30 UTC+08:00	Fadhli 16'; Norde 43'; Syahrul 82'	Report	Caion 18', 78'; Hyuri 22'	Stadium: Hang Jebat Stadium

== Competitions ==
=== Overall record ===
Competition	First match	Last match	Starting round	Final position	Record							
Competition	First match	Last match	Starting round	Final position	Pld	W	D	L	GF	GA	GD	Win %
Super League	4 March 2022	15 October 2022	Matchday 1	5th	22	8	6	8	39	33	+6	36.36
FA Cup	11 March 2022	6 August 2022	First round	Semi-finals	4	3	1	0	10	1	+9	75.00
Malaysia Cup	26 October 2022	26 November 2022	Round of 16	Runners-up	7	4	1	2	11	6	+5	57.14
Total					33	15	8	10	60	40	+20	45.45

Source: Soccerway

=== Super League ===
==== Table ====
Pos	Team	Pld	W	D	L	GF	GA	GD	Pts	Qualification or relegation
3	Sabah	22	13	3	6	36	26	+10	42	Qualification for AFC Cup group stage
4	Negeri Sembilan	22	12	5	5	33	26	+7	41	
5	Selangor	22	8	6	8	39	33	+6	30	
6	Kuala Lumpur City	22	8	5	9	30	31	−1	29	
7	Sri Pahang	22	8	4	10	33	31	+2	28	

Updated to match(es) played on unknown. Source: MFL
Rules for classification: 1) Points; 2) Goal difference; 3) Number of goals scored.

==== Results summary ====
Overall								Home						Away					
Pld	W	D	L	GF	GA	GD	Pts	W	D	L	GF	GA	GD	W	D	L	GF	GA	GD
22	8	6	8	39	33	+6	30	5	3	3	26	11	+15	3	3	5	13	22	−9

Source: Super League fixtures and results

==== Results by matchday ====
Win Draw Loss

Round	1	2	3	4	5	6	7	8	9	10	11	12	13	14	15	16	17	18	19	20	21	22
Ground	A	A	H	A	H	H	A	H	A	H	H	A	H	H	H	H	A	A	H	A	A	A
Result	D	D	W	L	W	W	L	D	L	W	D	L	L	L	L	D	W	L	W	W	W	D
Position	6	6	5	8	5	6	6	6	7	5	5	6	7	9	9	8	8	8	8	7	5	5

Updated to match(es) played on TBD 2021. Source: Super League fixtures and results
A = Away; H = Home; W = Win; D = Draw; L = Loss

==== Matches ====
The league fixtures were announced on 21 February 2022.

Win Draw Loss

4 March 2022 1	Kuala Lumpur City	3–3	Selangor	Bandar Tun Razak, Kuala Lumpur
21:00 UTC+08:00	Gallifuoco (yellow card) 18' (yellow-red card) 73'; Zhafri 20'; Hadin 32'; Lambert 60'; Kenny Pallraj (yellow card) 86'; Akram (yellow card) 90+4'	Report (1); Report (2)	Hyuri 19' (yellow card) 55'; Caion 27' (pen.), 78' (pen.); Syahir (yellow card) 86'	Stadium: Kuala Lumpur Stadium; Attendance: 2,517; Referee: Fitri Maskon
Note: The match has been delayed 40 minutes due to rain.

5 April 2022 2	Negeri Sembilan	2–2	Selangor	Seremban, Negeri Sembilan
22:00 UTC+08:00	Saiful (yellow card) 41'; Khuzaimi (yellow card) 50'; Goulon 58' (pen.); Kossi 76' (yellow card) 90+3'; Selvaraj (yellow card) 78'; Alves (yellow card) 89'	Report (1); Report (2)	Fazly (yellow card) 3'; Yazan (red card) 23'; Nasrullah 35' (o.g.); Caion 50' (pen.); Sharul (yellow card) 56'; Agyarkwa (yellow card) 89'	Stadium: Tuanku Abdul Rahman Stadium; Attendance: 2,230; Referee: Hamdan Awang

10 April 2022 3	Selangor	4–1	Kedah Darul Aman	Petaling Jaya, Selangor
22:00 UTC+08:00	Mukhairi 26'; Caion 34', 87'; Hakim 84'; Zahril (yellow card) 90+5'	Report (1); Report (2)	Azmeer (yellow card) 45+2'; Marcel (yellow card) 61'; Fayadh 90+2'	Stadium: MBPJ Stadium; Attendance: 2,655; Referee: Kamil Zakaria

22 April 2022 4	Terengganu	2–0	Selangor	Kuala Nerus, Terengganu
22:00 UTC+08:00	Faisal 20'; Tchétché 59' (pen.); Haroon (yellow card) 69'	Report (1); Report (2)	Sharul (yellow card) 19'; Yazan (yellow card) 58'; Zikri (yellow card) 74'; Sharif (yellow card) 77'	Stadium: Sultan Mizan Zainal Abidin Stadium; Attendance: 4,500; Referee: Zulkarnain Zakaria

29 April 2022 5	Selangor	3–1	Sri Pahang	Petaling Jaya, Selangor
22:00 UTC+08:00	Caion 37'; Syahir (yellow card) 45'; Hyuri 52' (yellow card) 53'; Yazan 75'	Report (1); Report (2)	Azam 62'; Za'tara (yellow card) 68'; Rowley (yellow card) 71'	Stadium: MBPJ Stadium; Attendance: 1,534; Referee: Khirulazuan Kidam
Note: The match was originally scheduled for 8 March 2022, but was postponed due to safety concerns following a COVID-19 outbreak at Sri Pahang squad.

19 June 2022 6	Selangor	7–0	Sarawak United	Petaling Jaya, Selangor
21:00 UTC+08:00	Brendan 7'; Hyuri 23'; Caion 45', 74', 88'; Hakim 51'; Agyarkwa (yellow card) 58'; Aliff Haiqal 90+2'	Report (1); Report (2)	Ashri (yellow card) 22'; Wark (yellow card) 47'; Sharbinee (yellow card) 57'; Azizi (yellow card) 90'	Stadium: MBPJ Stadium; Attendance: 1,999; Referee: Usaid Jamal

24 June 2022 7	Johor Darul Ta'zim	5–1	Selangor	Iskandar Puteri, Johor
20:15 UTC+08:00	Bergson 3', 55'; Arif (yellow card) 10'; Insa (yellow card) 22'; Forestieri 24'; Afiq (yellow card) 29'; Velázquez 35'; Sumareh 90+2'	Report (2)	Fazly (yellow card) 28'; Ajmal (yellow card) 38'; Safuwan (yellow card) 70'; Hakim 82'	Stadium: Sultan Ibrahim Stadium; Attendance: 30,142; Referee: Zulkarnain Zakaria

28 June 2022 8	Selangor	1–1	Sabah	Petaling Jaya, Selangor
21:00 UTC+08:00	Caion 3' (yellow card) 90+2'; Hyuri (yellow card) 62'; Sharul (yellow card) 84'; Yazan (yellow card) 90'	Report (1); Report (2)	Jackson (yellow card) 28'; Steven Robbat (yellow card) 32'; Saddil 53'; Baddrol (yellow card) 78'	Stadium: MBPJ Stadium; Attendance: 3,249; Referee: Nafeez Abd Wahab

5 July 2022 9	Melaka United	2–0	Selangor	Krubong, Malacca
20:15 UTC+08:00	Fadhil (yellow card) 22'; Ifedayo 39', 57'; Amirul Afiq (yellow card) 41'	Report (2)	Fazly (yellow card) 1'; Richmond (yellow card) 56'	Stadium: Hang Jebat Stadium; Attendance: 2,742; Referee: Nazmi Nasaruddin

16 July 2022 10	Selangor	2–0	Penang	Petaling Jaya, Selangor
21:00 UTC+08:00	Mukhairi (yellow card) 71'; Shahrel 73' (yellow card) 74'; Syahir 79'; Yazan (yellow card) 87'	Report (1); Report (2)	Sukri (yellow card) 27' (yellow-red card) 68'	Stadium: MBPJ Stadium; Attendance: 1,672; Referee: Suhaizi Shukri

20 July 2022 11	Selangor	1–1	Kuala Lumpur City	Petaling Jaya, Selangor
21:00 UTC+08:00	Brendan 36'; Fazly (yellow card) 39'; Zikri (yellow card) 51' (yellow-red card) 56'; Sharul (yellow card) 62'; Richmond (yellow card) 74'; Mukhairi (yellow card) 88'	Report (1); Report (2)	Zhafri (yellow card) 59'; Morales 68'; Faudzi (yellow card) 88'	Stadium: MBPJ Stadium; Attendance: 1,782; Referee: Nafeez Abd Wahab

27 July 2022 12	Sri Pahang	2–0	Selangor	Kuantan, Pahang
20:15 UTC+08:00	Rodríguez 34'; Malik 39'; Baqiuddin (yellow card) 60'; Mior (yellow card) 90+3'; Azwan (yellow card) 90+5'	Report (1); Report (2)	Hyuri (yellow card) 31'; Aliff Haiqal (yellow card) 56'	Stadium: Darul Makmur Stadium; Attendance: 1,062; Referee: Ahmad Zuhadi Dzulkifli

31 July 2022 13	Selangor	2–3	Negeri Sembilan	Petaling Jaya, Selangor
21:00 UTC+08:00	Caion 9'; Yazan 30'; Sharul (yellow card) 71'	Report (2)	Gustavo 66', 80' (yellow card) 81'; Rashid (yellow card) 86'; Selvaraj 88'	Stadium: MBPJ Stadium; Attendance: 2,452; Referee: Fitri Maskon

17 August 2022 14	Selangor	0–2	Terengganu	Petaling Jaya, Selangor
21:00 UTC+08:00	Baha' (yellow card) 34'; Sharul (yellow card) 81'; Mukhairi (yellow card) 84'; Yazan (yellow card) 90+3'	Report (2)	Habib 13'; Ott 39'; Azalinullah (yellow card) 45+2'; Azam (yellow card) 71'; Arif (yellow card) 90+3'	Stadium: MBPJ Stadium; Attendance: 2,250; Referee: Usaid Jamal

21 August 2022 15	Selangor	0–1	Petaling Jaya City	Petaling Jaya, Selangor
21:00 UTC+08:00	Mukhairi (yellow card) 39'	Report (2)	Zainal (yellow card) 29'; Darren 59' (yellow card) 90'	Stadium: MBPJ Stadium; Attendance: 680; Referee: Nafeez Abd Wahab
Note: The match was originally scheduled for 4 August 2022.

3 September 2022 16	Selangor	1–1	Johor Darul Ta'zim	Petaling Jaya, Selangor
20:15 UTC+08:00	Haiqal (yellow card) 51'; Caion 65'; Agyarkwa (yellow card) 69'; Hakim (yellow card) 88'; Ashmawi (yellow card) 90'	Report (2)	Bergson 32' (pen.); Shane (yellow card) 65'; Shahrul (yellow card) 84'; Wan (yellow card) 90+4'	Stadium: MBPJ Stadium; Attendance: 4,104; Referee: Zulkarnain Zakaria
Note: The match was originally scheduled for 14 August 2022.

10 September 2022 17	Sabah	2–3	Selangor	Kota Kinabalu, Sabah
19:30 UTC+08:00	Baddrol 30'; Embaló 41'; Rizal (yellow card) 71'	Report (1); Report (2)	Mukhairi 24'; Brendan 25'; Cheng (yellow card) 52'; Htet Aung 75' (yellow card) 77'; Harith (yellow card) 80'; Aliff (yellow card) 90+1'	Stadium: Likas Stadium; Attendance: 13,388; Referee: Usaid Jamal
Note: The match was originally scheduled for 1 September 2022.

14 September 2022 18	Kedah Darul Aman	3–1	Selangor	Alor Setar, Kedah
21:00 UTC+08:00	Ronald 23'; Vales 30'; Shahril (yellow card) 85'; Mahmoud (yellow card) 90+3'; Fayadh 90+5'	Report (2)	Brendan (yellow card) 32'; Caion 33'; Zikri (yellow card) 67'; Syahir (yellow card) 89'	Stadium: Darulaman Stadium; Attendance: 5,079; Referee: Hamdan Awang
Note: The match was originally scheduled for 10 August 2022.

1 October 2022 19	Selangor	5–0	Melaka United	Petaling Jaya, Selangor
21:00 UTC+08:00	Hakim 15'; Mukhairi 32'; Fazly (yellow card) 59'; Brendan 66', 78'; Caion 90' (pen.)	Report (1); Report (2)	Fadhli (yellow card) 35'; Zaharulnizam (red card) 74'; Amirul Afiq (yellow card) 89'	Stadium: MBPJ Stadium; Attendance: 2,245; Referee: Nazmi Nasaruddin
Note: The match was originally scheduled for 6 September 2022.

7 October 2022 20	Petaling Jaya City	0–1	Selangor	Petaling Jaya, Selangor
20:15 UTC+08:00	Prabakaran (yellow card) 13'; Mahalli (yellow card) 62'; Kalamullah (yellow card) 90+2'	Report (1); Report (2)	Danial 81'; Brendan (yellow card) 90+3'	Stadium: MBPJ Stadium; Attendance: 1,134; Referee: Usaid Jamal
Note: The match was originally scheduled for 9 September 2022.

11 October 2022 21	Sarawak United	0–1	Selangor	Kuching, Sarawak
19:30 UTC+08:00	Rahman (yellow card) 57'; Chanturu (yellow card) 68'; Stuart (yellow card) 90'	Report (1); Report (2)	Htet Aung 71'; Fazly (yellow card) 90'	Stadium: Sarawak Stadium; Attendance: 354; Referee: Fusser Mad Sallih
Note: The match was originally scheduled for 14 September 2022.

15 October 2022 22	Penang	1–1	Selangor	George Town, Penang
21:00 UTC+08:00	Rafael Vitor 31' (pen.); Azim (yellow card) 65'	Report (1); Report (2)	Sharul (red card) 29'; Harith (yellow card) 35'; Hakim 36'; Zikri (yellow card) 67'; Yazan (yellow card) 90+4'	Stadium: City Stadium, Penang; Attendance: 3,067; Referee: Nafeez Abd Wahab
Note: The match was originally scheduled for 17 September 2022.

==== Results overview ====
Win Draw Loss

Team	Home score	Away score	Double
Johor Darul Ta'zim	1–1	1–5	2–6
Kedah Darul Aman	4–1	1–3	5–4
Kuala Lumpur City	1–1	3–3	4–4
Melaka United	5–0	0–2	5–2
Negeri Sembilan	2–3	2–2	4–5
Penang	2–0	1–1	3–1
Petaling Jaya City	0–1	1–0	1–1
Sabah	1–1	3–2	4–3
Sarawak United	7–0	1–0	8–0
Sri Pahang	3–1	0–2	3–3
Terengganu	0–2	0–2	0–4

=== FA Cup ===
11 March 2022 First Round	Selangor	6–0	Harini	Petaling Jaya, Selangor
21:00 UTC+08:00	Caion 17', 63', 67'; Hyuri 29'; Safuwan 42' (yellow card) 45'; Syahir 46'	Report (1); Report (2)	Afiq (yellow card) 77'; Thivagar (yellow card) 83'	Stadium: MBPJ Stadium; Attendance: 702; Referee: Ahmad Zuhadi Dzulkifli

8 July 2022 Second Round	Selangor	1–0	Kuala Lumpur City	Petaling Jaya, Selangor
21:00 UTC+08:00	Cheng (yellow card) 8'; Yazan (yellow card) 22'; Brendan (yellow card) 25'; Agyarkwa (yellow card) 57'; Aliff 62'; Sommerville (yellow card) 90+4'	Report (2)	Akram (yellow card) 45+1'	Stadium: MBPJ Stadium; Attendance: 2,354; Referee: Hamdan Awang
Note: The match was originally scheduled for 2 July 2022.

23 July 2022 Quarter-finals	Sabah	0–2	Selangor	Kota Kinabalu, Sabah
19:30 UTC+08:00	Rawilson (yellow card) 64'; Park (yellow card) 84'	Report (1); Report (2)	Hyuri 1'; Fazly (yellow card) 45+1'; Caion 81'	Stadium: Likas Stadium; Attendance: 19,410; Referee: Suhaizi Shukri

6 August 2022 Semi-finals	Terengganu	1–1 (4–2 p)	Selangor	Kuala Nerus, Terengganu
21:00 UTC+08:00	Faisal 49'; Zuasyraf (yellow card) 90'	Report (2)	Hakim 24'; Sharul (yellow card) 38'; Brendan (yellow card) 62'	Stadium: Sultan Mizan Zainal Abidin Stadium; Attendance: 33,332; Referee: Zulkarnain Zakaria
	Penalties
	Habib (penalty scored); Zuasyraf (penalty scored); Ott (penalty missed); Engku (penalty scored); Shahrul (penalty scored)		Baha' (penalty scored); Haiqal (penalty missed); Yazan (penalty missed); Shahrel (penalty scored)

=== Malaysia Cup ===
==== Round of 16 ====
26 October 2022 First leg	Kelantan United	0–2	Selangor	Kota Bharu, Kelantan
21:00 UTC+08:00	Nik Azli (yellow card) 19'	Report (1); Report (2)	Caion 37', 63'	Stadium: Sultan Muhammad IV Stadium; Attendance: 1,648; Referee: Zamzaidi Katimin

1 November 2022 Second leg	Selangor	1–0 (3–0 agg.)	Kelantan United	Petaling Jaya, Selangor
21:00 UTC+08:00	Agyarkwa (yellow card) 74'; Akif 90+1' (o.g.)	Report (1); Report (2)		Stadium: MBPJ Stadium; Attendance: 1,982; Referee: Usaid Jamal

==== Quarter-finals ====
6 November 2022 First leg	Selangor	2–0	Negeri Sembilan	Petaling Jaya, Selangor
21:00 UTC+08:00	Caion (yellow card) 45+1' (goal) 56' (pen.); Haiqal 90+1'	Report (1); Report (2)	Hariz (yellow card) 49'; Goulon (red card) 54'	Stadium: MBPJ Stadium; Attendance: 3,761; Referee: Amirul Izwan Yaacob

12 November 2022 Second leg	Negeri Sembilan	2–2 (2–4 agg.)	Selangor	Paroi, Negeri Sembilan
21:00 UTC+08:00	Alves 24' (pen.) (yellow card) 41'; Zaquan 45+3'; Khuzaimi (yellow card) 61'; Zulkhairi (red card) 90+2'	Report (1); Report (2)	Caion 10' (pen.); Yazan 45'; Baha' (yellow card) 84'	Stadium: Tuanku Abdul Rahman Stadium; Attendance: 11,149; Referee: Nazmi Nasaruddin

==== Semi-finals ====
16 November 2022 First leg	Selangor	3–1	Terengganu	Petaling Jaya, Selangor
21:00 UTC+08:00	Mukhairi (yellow card) 25'; Ankrah 37'; Caion 43'; Sharul 54'	Report (1); Report (2)	Tchétché 19'; Sherman (yellow card) 50'; Azarul (yellow card) 90+4'	Stadium: MBPJ Stadium; Attendance: 14,554; Referee: Zamzaidi Katimin

21 November 2022 Second leg	Terengganu	1–0 (2–3 agg.)	Selangor	Kuala Nerus, Terengganu
21:00 UTC+08:00	Tchétché 36'	Report (1); Report (2)	Yazan (yellow card) 45+3' (yellow-red card) 87'; Htet Aung (yellow card) 55'	Stadium: Sultan Mizan Zainal Abidin Stadium; Attendance: 33,352; Referee: Suhaizi Shukri

==== Final ====
26 November 2022 Final	Johor Darul Ta'zim	2–1	Selangor	Bukit Jalil, Kuala Lumpur
21:00 UTC+08:00	Corbin-Ong (yellow card) 20'; Velázquez (yellow card) 35'; Davies (yellow card) 44'; Bergson 45+2'; Forestieri 59'	Report (2)	Caion 45' (pen.); Mukhairi (yellow card) 69'; Haiqal (yellow card) 82'	Stadium: Bukit Jalil National Stadium; Attendance: 79,988; Referee: Nazmi Nasaruddin

== Statistics ==
=== Squad statistics ===
As of 26 November 2022

Appearances (Apps.) numbers are for appearances in competitive games only including sub appearances.
Red card numbers denote: Numbers in parentheses represent red cards overturned for wrongful dismissal.

No.	Nat.	Player	Pos.	Super League				FA Cup				Malaysia Cup				Total			
No.	Nat.	Player	Pos.	Apps	Goal	Yellow card	Red card	Apps	Goal	Yellow card	Red card	Apps	Goal	Yellow card	Red card	Apps	Goal	Yellow card	Red card
1	(Malaysia)	Khairulazhan	GK	7								7				14			
2	(Malaysia)	Quentin Cheng	DF	22		1		4		1		7				33		2	
3	(Malaysia)	Azrin Afiq	DF	1				2								3			
4	(Malaysia)	Ashmawi Yakin	DF	4		1		1								5		1	
5	(Jordan)	Yazan Al-Arab	DF	19	2	5	1	4		1		5	1		1	28	3	6	2
6	(Malaysia)	Zahril Azri	MF	5		1		1								6		1	
7	(Malaysia)	Mukhairi Ajmal	MF	21	3	5		4				7		2		32	3	7	
8	(Malaysia)	Nik Sharif †	MF	1		1										1		1	
9	(Malaysia)	Hakim Hassan	MF	19	5	1		4	1			7				30	6	1	
10	(Brazil)	Caion	FW	22	14	1		4	4			7	6	1		33	24	2	
12	(Brazil)	Hyuri	FW	8	3	4		3	2							11	5	4	
13	(Malaysia)	R. Dinesh	DF																
14	(Malaysia)	Zikri Khalili	DF	14		3	1	2				4				20		3	1
17	(Malaysia)	Danial Asri	FW	10	1			1				6				17	1		
18	(Malaysia)	Halim Saari	MF																
19	(Malaysia)	Shahrel Fikri	FW	13	1	1		3				3				19	1	1	
21	(Singapore)	Safuwan Baharudin	MF	5		1		1	1	1						6	1	2	
22	(Malaysia)	Fazly Mazlan	DF	19		6		2		1		7				28		7	
23	(Malaysia)	Sam Somerville	GK	15				4		1						19		1	
24	(Ghana)	Alex Agyarkwa	MF	19		3		3		1		6		1		28		5	
25	(Malaysia)	Izhan Nazrel	GK																
30	(Myanmar)	Hein Htet Aung	MF	19	2	1		3				7		1		29	2	2	
33	(Ghana)	Richmond Ankrah	DF	5		2						3	1			8	1	2	
35	(Malaysia)	Abdul Rahman	MF	1												1			
36	(Malaysia)	Aliff Izwan	MF	3				2								5			
39	(Ghana)	Kelvin Kyei	MF									3				3			
43	(Malaysia)	Syahir Bashah	MF	14	1	3		3	1			5				22	2	3	
44	(Malaysia)	Sharul Nazeem	DF	18		6	1	4		1		6	1			28	1	7	1
55	(Malaysia)	Harith Haiqal	DF	8		2						1				9		2	
77	(Malaysia)	Aliff Haiqal	MF	14	1	3		3	1			7	1	1		24	3	4	
88	(Malaysia)	Brendan Gan	MF	16	5	2		3		2		7				26	5	4	
99	(Jordan)	Baha' Abdel-Rahman	MF	12		1		2				3		1		17		2	
Own goals					1				0				1				2		
Totals					39	54	3		10	9	0		11	7	1		60	70	4

† Player left the club during the season.

=== Goalscorers ===
Includes all competitive matches.

As of match played 26 November 2022

Rank	Pos.	No.	Player	Super League	FA Cup	Malaysia Cup	Total
1	FW	10	(Brazil) Caion	14	4	6	24
2	MF	9	(Malaysia) Hakim Hassan	5	1	0	6
3	FW	12	(Brazil) Hyuri	3	2	0	5
3	MF	88	(Malaysia) Brendan Gan	5	0	0	5
5	DF	5	(Jordan) Yazan Al-Arab	2	0	1	3
5	MF	7	(Malaysia) Mukhairi Ajmal	3	0	0	3
5	MF	77	(Malaysia) Aliff Haiqal	1	1	1	3
8	MF	30	(Myanmar) Hein Htet Aung	2	0	0	2
8	MF	43	(Malaysia) Syahir Bashah	1	1	0	2
10	FW	17	(Malaysia) Danial Asri	1	0	0	1
10	FW	19	(Malaysia) Shahrel Fikri	1	0	0	1
10	DF	21	(Singapore) Safuwan Baharudin	0	1	0	1
10	DF	33	(Ghana) Richmond Ankrah	0	0	1	1
10	DF	44	(Malaysia) Sharul Nazeem	0	0	1	1
Own Goals				1	0	1	2
TOTALS				39	10	11	60
Own Goals Conceded
1	TBD	TBD	TBD	0	0	0	0
TOTALS				0	0	0	0

=== Top assists ===
Rnk	Pos	No.	Player	Super League	FA Cup	Malaysia Cup	Total
1	MF	7	(Malaysia) Mukhairi Ajmal	4	2	3	9
2	FW	10	(Brazil) Caion	5	1	0	6
3	MF	30	(Myanmar) Hein Htet Aung	4	0	1	5
4	MF	24	(Ghana) Alex Agyarkwa	4	0	0	4
5	DF	2	(Malaysia) Quentin Cheng	1	1	1	3
5	MF	77	(Malaysia) Aliff Haiqal	3	0	0	3
7	MF	9	(Malaysia) Hakim Hassan	1	1	0	2
7	FW	12	(Brazil) Hyuri	0	2	0	2
7	DF	14	(Malaysia) Zikri Khalili	1	1	0	2
10	DF	3	(Malaysia) Azrin Afiq	0	1	0	1
10	FW	17	(Malaysia) Danial Asri	1	0	0	1
10	FW	19	(Malaysia) Shahrel Fikri	1	0	0	1
10	DF	22	(Malaysia) Fazly Mazlan	0	0	1	1
10	MF	36	(Malaysia) Aliff Izwan	1	0	0	1
10	MF	39	(Ghana) Kelvin Kyei	0	0	1	1
10	MF	43	(Malaysia) Syahir Bashah	1	0	0	1
10	DF	44	(Malaysia) Sharul Nazeem	1	0	0	1
10	MF	88	(Malaysia) Brendan Gan	0	1	0	1
10	MF	99	(Jordan) Baha' Abdel-Rahman	1	0	0	1
TOTALS				29	10	7	46

=== Clean sheets ===
Rnk	No.	Player	Super League	FA Cup	Malaysia Cup	Total
1	23	(Malaysia) Sam Somerville	4	3	0	7
2	1	(Malaysia) Khairulazhan	1	0	3	4
TOTALS			5	3	3	11

=== Disciplinary record ===
As of match played 26 November 2022

Rank	Pos.	No.	Name	Super League			FA Cup			Malaysia Cup			Total		
Rank	Pos.	No.	Name	Yellow card	(yellow card) (yellow-red card)	Red card	Yellow card	(yellow card) (yellow-red card)	Red card	Yellow card	(yellow card) (yellow-red card)	Red card	Yellow card	(yellow card) (yellow-red card)	Red card
1	MF	7	(Malaysia) Mukhairi Ajmal	5	-	-	-	-	-	2	-	-	7	-	-
1	DF	22	(Malaysia) Fazly Mazlan	6	-	-	1	-	-	-	-	-	7	-	-
1	DF	44	(Malaysia) Sharul Nazeem	6	-	1	1	-	-	-	-	-	7	-	1
4	DF	5	(Jordan) Yazan Al-Arab	5	-	1	1	-	-	-	1	-	6	1	1
5	MF	24	(Ghana) Alex Agyarkwa	3	-	-	1	-	-	1	-	-	5	-	-
6	FW	12	(Brazil) Hyuri	4	-	-	-	-	-	-	-	-	4	-	-
6	MF	77	(Malaysia) Aliff Haiqal	3	-	-	-	-	-	1	-	-	4	-	-
6	MF	88	(Malaysia) Brendan Gan	2	-	-	2	-	-	-	-	-	4	-	-
9	DF	14	(Malaysia) Zikri Khalili	3	1	-	-	-	-	-	-	-	3	1	-
9	MF	43	(Malaysia) Syahir Bashah	3	-	-	-	-	-	-	-	-	3	-	-
11	DF	2	(Malaysia) Quentin Cheng	1	-	-	1	-	-	-	-	-	2	-	-
11	FW	10	(Brazil) Caion	1	-	-	-	-	-	1	-	-	2	-	-
11	DF	21	(Singapore) Safuwan Baharudin	1	-	-	1	-	-	-	-	-	2	-	-
11	MF	30	(Myanmar) Hein Htet Aung	1	-	-	-	-	-	1	-	-	2	-	-
11	DF	33	(Ghana) Richmond Ankrah	2	-	-	-	-	-	-	-	-	2	-	-
11	DF	55	(Malaysia) Harith Haiqal	2	-	-	-	-	-	-	-	-	2	-	-
11	MF	99	(Jordan) Baha' Abdel-Rahman	1	-	-	-	-	-	1	-	-	2	-	-
18	DF	4	(Malaysia) Ashmawi Yakin	1	-	-	-	-	-	-	-	-	1	-	-
18	MF	6	(Malaysia) Zahril Azri	1	-	-	-	-	-	-	-	-	1	-	-
18	MF	8	(Malaysia) Nik Sharif †	1	-	-	-	-	-	-	-	-	1	-	-
18	MF	9	(Malaysia) Hakim Hassan	1	-	-	-	-	-	-	-	-	1	-	-
18	FW	19	(Malaysia) Shahrel Fikri	1	-	-	-	-	-	-	-	-	1	-	-
18	GK	23	(Malaysia) Sam Somerville	-	-	-	1	-	-	-	-	-	1	-	-
Total				54	1	2	9	0	0	7	1	0	70	2	2

† Player left the club during the season.
