= Aliff Haiqal =

Malaysian footballer (born 2000)

Personal information
- Full name: Aliff Haiqal bin Lokman Hakim Lau
- Date of birth: 11 July 2000 (age 26)
- Place of birth: Kajang, Selangor, Malaysia
- Height: 1.68 m (5 ft 6 in)
- Position: Midfielder

Team information
- Current team: Penang

Youth career
- 2017–2018: PKNS

Senior career*
Years	Team	Apps	(Gls)
2018–2019	PKNS	2	(0)
2019–2020	Selangor II	2	(2)
2020–	Selangor	81	(4)
2026–	→ Penang (loan)	0	(0)

International career^{‡}
2014–2016	Malaysia U16	16	(2)
2022–	Malaysia	3	(0)
Medal record
Men's football
Representing Malaysia
AFF Championship
Third place	2022
- * Club domestic league appearances and goals as of 7 June 2026 ‡ National team caps and goals as of 21 December 2022

Aliff Haiqal bin Lokman Hakim Lau (born 11 July 2000) is a Malaysian professional footballer who plays as a midfielder for Malaysia Super League club Penang, on loan from Selangor and the Malaysia national team.

== Club career ==
=== PKNS ===
Aliff started his career at PKNS youth team and made his professional debut in a Super League match against Melaka United on 16 July 2019. He only played two matches with the club during that season.

=== Selangor ===
With the departure of PKNS FC from a part in professional football and has been changed sides to become 'Reserve Team' (now as Selangor II) for Selangor Football Club, Aliff switch sides to join the club and been choose to stay under with reserve team. He made his debut and scored his first goal for Selangor II on 28 August 2020 against Kuching in a 2020 Malaysia Premier League matches.

He broke into the senior team for the first time as an unused substitute in a Super League match against UiTM on 26 September 2020. Later, he was promoted to the first team on 2 December 2020 ahead of the 2021 season.

== International career ==
Aliff has played for several Malaysian youth sides. He played for the U-16 team and U-19 team from 2014 to 2019, and gradually made his way into the older classes. On 14 December 2022, Aliff made his debut with senior team in a friendly match against Maldives after coming on as a substitute at 70th minute in place of Mukhairi Ajmal.

On 11 July 2026, Aliff was named in the 26-man team in preparation for the 2026 ASEAN Championship. This was his first call-up to the national team since the 2022 AFF Championship, when he made two appearances off the bench against Myanmar and Laos.

== Personal life ==
Aliff was born in Kajang, Selangor to a Malaysian Chinese father and Malay mother. His father was a former player for Selangor FC, Lao Kok Kit.

== Career statistics ==
=== Club ===
As of 27 May 2026

Appearances and goals by club, season and competition
Club	Season	League			Cup (Note: Includes Malaysia FA Cup)		League Cup (Note: Includes Malaysia Cup)		Continental		Other		Total	
Club	Season	Division	Apps	Goals	Apps	Goals	Apps	Goals	Apps	Goals	Apps	Goals	Apps	Goals
PKNS	2019	Malaysia Super League	2	0	0	0	0	0	—				2	0
PKNS	Total		2	0	0	0	0	0	0	0	0	0	2	0
Selangor II	2020	Malaysia Premier League	4	1	0	0	—						4	1
Selangor	2020	Malaysia Super League	3	0	0	0	1	0	—				4	0
Selangor	2021	Malaysia Super League	18	0	0	0	6	0	—				24	0
Selangor	2022	Malaysia Super League	14	1	3	1	7	1	—				24	3
Selangor	2023	Malaysia Super League	22	1	2	0	3	0	—				27	1
Selangor	2024–25	Malaysia Super League	18	2	5	0	2	0	5 (Note: Appearances in AFC Champions League Two)	0	5 (Note: Appearance(s) in MFL Challenge Cup)	0	35	2
Selangor	2025–26	Malaysia Super League	6	0	3	0	2	0	2	0	2 (Note: Appearance(s) in ASEAN Club Championship)	0	15	0
Selangor	Total		81	4	13	1	21	1	7	0	7	0	129	6
Penang (loan)	2026–27	Malaysia Super League	0	0	0	0	0	0	—		—		0	0
Career total			87	5	13	1	21	1	7	0	7	0	135	7

== Honours ==
Selangor

- Malaysia Cup runner-up: 2022
- Malaysia Super League runner-up: 2023
- MFL Challenge Cup: 2024-25
