= Alex Agyarkwa =

Ghanaian professional footballer

Personal information
- Full name: Alexander Agyarkwa Ameyaw
- Date of birth: 18 July 2000 (age 26)
- Place of birth: Mampong, Ghana
- Height: 1.72 m (5 ft 7 1/2 in)
- Position: Midfielder

Team information
- Current team: Selangor
- Number: 24

Youth career
- 2017–2020: Phar Rangers
- 2021: → Selangor II (loan)

Senior career*
Years	Team	Apps	(Gls)
2020–2021	Accra Lions	0	(0)
2021	→ Selangor (loan)	0	(0)
2021–	Selangor	47	(0)
2025	→ Negeri Sembilan (loan)	6	(1)
- * Club domestic league appearances and goals as of June 7, 2026 (UTC)

Alexander Agyarkwa Ameyaw (born 18 July 2000) is a Ghanaian professional footballer who plays as a midfielder for Malaysia Super League club Selangor.

== Club career ==
=== Early year ===
Agyarkwa was born in the Akuapim North Municipal District. He is a youth product of the Ghanaian clubs Phar Rangers in Division One League, before moving to the youth academy of Accra Lions in 2021.

=== Selangor ===
After spending half a season with Accra Lions, Agyarkwa joined the Malaysian club Selangor in the middle of 2021 on a season-long loan deal. He started with appearances for the reserve side Selangor II, where he impressed with three goals in five games. Having impressed the coach Karsten Neitzel, he finally made his debut in the first team on 3 November 2021, playing full 90-minutes in a 2–1 away win against Kuching City. Later, Agyarkwa signed a permanent deal with Selangor in the 2021 off-season.

==== Negeri Sembilan (loan) ====
On 15 July 2025, Agyarkwa joined Negeri Sembilan on loan for the 2025–26 season.

== Career statistics ==
=== Club ===
As of 27 May 2026

Club	Season	League			Cup (Note: Includes Malaysia FA Cup)		League Cup (Note: Includes Malaysia Cup)		Continental		Other		Total	
Club	Season	Division	Apps	Goals	Apps	Goals	Apps	Goals	Apps	Goals	Apps	Goals	Apps	Goals
Selangor (loan)	2021	Malaysia Super League	0	0	0	0	5	0	—				5	0
Selangor	2022	Malaysia Super League	19	0	3	0	6	0	—				28	0
Selangor	2023	Malaysia Super League	18	0	2	0	1	0	—				21	0
Selangor	2024–25	Malaysia Super League	9	0	6	0	0	0	0 (Note: Appearances in AFC Champions League Two)	0	4 (Note: Appearance(s) in MFL Challenge Cup)	0	19	0
Selangor	2025–26	Malaysia Super League	1	0	0	0	1	0	0	0	0 (Note: Appearance(s) in ASEAN Club Championship)	0	2	0
Selangor	Total		47	0	11	0	13	0	0	0	4	0	75	0
Negeri Sembilan (loan)	2025–26	Malaysia Super League	6	1	2	0	0	0	—				8	1
Career total			53	1	13	0	13	0	0	0	4	0	83	1
