= Richmond Ankrah =

Ghanaian footballer (born 2000)

Personal information
- Full name: Richmond Tetteh Ankrah
- Date of birth: 22 February 2000 (age 26)
- Place of birth: Ghana
- Height: 1.90 m (6 ft 3 in)
- Position: Centre-back

Team information
- Current team: Selangor
- Number: 4

Youth career
- 2020–2021: Accra Lions
- 2022–: Selangor II

Senior career*
| Years | Team | Apps | (Gls) |
| 2021 | Accra Lions | 11 | (1) |
| 2022– | Selangor | 24 | (1) |
| 2024 | → Penang (loan) | 18 | (0) |
- * Club domestic league appearances and goals as of 7 June 2026

Richmond Tetteh Ankrah (born 22 February 2000) is a Ghanaian professional footballer who plays as a centre-back for Malaysia Super League club Selangor.

== Career ==
=== Accra Lions ===
Ankrah began his career with Accra Lions academy. He was part of the club to win the title in the 2020–21 Ghana Division One and help the club earned promotion to the Ghana Premier League next season.

=== Selangor ===
On 23 March 2022, Ankrah was loaned to Malaysia Super League side Selangor for the remainder of their 2022 season, and being initially assigned to the reserve team. On 5 July 2022, he received his first call-up to the senior squad, and made his debut against Melaka United with a 2–0 away loss in the league match. Halfway throughout the season, Ankrah loaned move was made permanent. His first goal for Selangor came on 16 November, in a 3–1 home win against Terengganu in the first leg of the Malaysia Cup semi-finals tie.

==== Penang (loan) ====
On 28 March 2024, Ankrah signed for another Malaysia Super League club Penang on loan for the 2024–25 season.

2025

== Career statistics ==
As of 27 May 2026

Appearances and goals by club, season and competition
| Club | Season | League | | | National cup | | League cup | | Continental | | Total | |
| Club | Season | Division | Apps | Goals | Apps | Goals | Apps | Goals | Apps | Goals | Apps | Goals |
|---|---|---|---|---|---|---|---|---|---|---|---|---|
| Accra Lions | 2021–22 | Ghana Premier League | 11 | 1 | — | | — | | — | | 11 | 1 |
| Selangor | 2022 | Malaysia Super League | 5 | 0 | 0 | 0 | 3 | 1 | — | | 8 | 1 |
| Selangor | 2023 | Malaysia Super League | 4 | 0 | 0 | 0 | 0 | 0 | — | | 4 | 0 |
| Selangor | 2025–26 | Malaysia Super League | 15 | 1 | 3 | 0 | 2 | 0 | 9 (Note: Appearances in AFC Champions League Two & ASEAN Club Championship) | 0 | 29 | 1 |
| Selangor | Total | | 24 | 1 | 3 | 0 | 5 | 1 | 9 | 0 | 41 | 2 |
| Penang (loan) | 2024–25 | Malaysia Super League | 20 | 0 | 3 | 0 | 2 | 0 | — | | 25 | 0 |
| Penang (loan) | Career total | | 55 | 2 | 6 | 0 | 7 | 1 | 9 | 0 | 77 | 3 |
