= Azrin Afiq =

Malaysian footballer

Personal information
- Full name: Muhammad Azrin Afiq bin Rusmini
- Date of birth: 6 January 2002 (age 24)
- Place of birth: Klang, Selangor, Malaysia
- Height: 1.82 m (5 ft 11 1/2 in)
- Positions: Left back; centre back

Team information
- Current team: Negeri Sembilan

Youth career
- 2017–2019: Mokhtar Dahari Academy

Senior career*
| Years | Team | Apps | (Gls) |
| 2020–2021 | Selangor II | 23 | (0) |
| 2022– | Selangor | 2 | (0) |
| 2023 | → Kedah Darul Aman (loan) | 4 | (0) |
| 2024 | → Negeri Sembilan (loan) | 13 | (0) |
| 2025– | Negeri Sembilan | 2 | (0) |

International career^{‡}
| 2019– | Malaysia U23 | 4 | (0) |
- * Club domestic league appearances and goals as of 8 June 2026 ‡ National team caps and goals as of 28 May 2022

Muhammad Azrin Afiq bin Rusmini (Jawi: محمد عزرين افيق بن روسميني, IPA: [muhammad azrɪn afɪq bɪn rusmɪnɪ]; born 6 January 2002) is a Malaysian professional footballer who plays as a left back or a centre back for Malaysia Super League club Negeri Sembilan.

== Club career ==
=== Selangor ===
On early career, Azrin signed for Selangor from Academy Mokhtar Dahari at the age of 19. He made his debut for the first team on August 29, 2020, against Petaling Jaya City, coming on as substitute. On 25 November 2021, Selangor confirmed that Azrin would be definitely promoted to Selangor's first team for 2022 season.

==== Kedah Darul Aman (loan) ====
On 29 December 2022, Azrin signed to Kedah Darul Aman on loan until the end of the 2023 season.

=== Negeri Sembilan ===
On 13 March 2024, Selangor sent Azrin on loan to Negeri Sembilan until the end of the 2024–25 season. On 23 June 2025, Azrin signed permanently for Negeri Sembilan on a free transfer.

== International career ==
=== Youth ===
Azrin represented the Malaysian at various youth levels and was selected by under-19 squad under coach Brad Maloney as part of the Malaysia's 24-man squad set for 2020 AFC U-19 Championship qualification tournament. He was part of the under-23 squad for represent 2021 Southeast Asian Games in Vietnam.

== Career statistics ==
=== Club ===
As of match played 8 June 2026

Appearances and goals by club, season and competition
| Club | Season | League | | | Cup | | League Cup | | Continental | | Total | |
| Club | Season | Division | Apps | Goals | Apps | Goals | Apps | Goals | Apps | Goals | Apps | Goals |
|---|---|---|---|---|---|---|---|---|---|---|---|---|
| Selangor | 2020 | Malaysia Super League | 1 | 0 | 0 | 0 | 0 | 0 | — | | 1 | 0 |
| Selangor | 2021 | Malaysia Super League | 0 | 0 | 0 | 0 | 0 | 0 | — | | 0 | 0 |
| Selangor | 2022 | Malaysia Super League | 1 | 0 | 2 | 0 | 0 | 0 | — | | 3 | 0 |
| Selangor | Total | | 2 | 0 | 2 | 0 | 0 | 0 | 0 | 0 | 4 | 0 |
| Kedah Darul Aman (loan) | 2023 | Malaysia Super League | 4 | 0 | 0 | 0 | 0 | 0 | — | | 4 | 0 |
| Negeri Sembilan (Note: Loaned from Selangor in 2024–25 season.) | 2024–25 | Malaysia Super League | 13 | 0 | 0 | 0 | 0 | 0 | — | | 13 | 0 |
| Negeri Sembilan | 2025–26 | Malaysia Super League | 2 | 0 | 1 | 0 | 0 | 0 | — | | 3 | 0 |
| Negeri Sembilan | Total | | 15 | 0 | 1 | 0 | 0 | 0 | 0 | 0 | 16 | 0 |
| Career total | | | 21 | 0 | 3 | 0 | 0 | 0 | 0 | 0 | 24 | 0 |
