= Faiz Amer =

Malaysian footballer (born 2003)

Personal information
- Full name: Muhammad Faiz Bin Amer Runnizar
- Date of birth: 15 February 2003 (age 23)
- Place of birth: Putrajaya, Selangor, Malaysia
- Height: 1.80 m (5 ft 11 in)
- Position: Centre back

Team information
- Current team: Selangor
- Number: 29

Youth career
- –2020: Mokhtar Dahari Academy
- 2021–: Selangor

Senior career*
Years	Team	Apps	(Gls)
2023–	Selangor	1	(0)

International career
2019–2022	Malaysia U19	5	(1)
2022–	Malaysia U23	0	(0)
Medal record
Men's football
Representing Malaysia
ASEAN U-19 Boys' Championship
Winner	2022
- * Club domestic league appearances and goals as of 9:30, 5 April 2024 (UTC)

Muhammad Faiz Bin Amer Runnizar (born 15 February 2003) is a Malaysian professional footballer who plays as a centre back for Malaysia Super League club Selangor. He has represented Malaysia at youth level.

== Club career ==
=== Selangor ===
Faiz played for Mokhtar Dahari Academy (AMD) before joining Selangor academy on aged 17. He progressed through the club's youth ranks and signed his first professional deal with the club on 2023, retaining him for the 2023 season.

Faiz appeared in the substitute bench for several matches on the first team squad. Later, he made his debut as a substitute in the league match against Kelantan on 25 August 2023. On 5 February 2024, Faiz been promoted to the first team for 2024–25 season.

== International career ==
=== Youth ===
Faiz has represented Malaysia at all youth level from the under 19-side to the under-23 sides. He successfully led the Malaysia U19 squad to become champions for the second time in the tournament.

== Career statistics ==
=== Club ===
As of 5 April 2024

Appearances and goals by club, season and competition
Club	Season	League			Cup (Note: Includes Malaysia FA Cup)		League Cup (Note: Includes Malaysia Cup)		Continental (Note: Includes AFC Champions League and AFC Champions League Two)		Total	
Club	Season	Division	Apps	Goals	Apps	Goals	Apps	Goals	Apps	Goals	Apps	Goals
Selangor	2023	Malaysia Super League	1	0	0	0	0	0	—		1	0
Selangor	2024–25	Malaysia Super League	0	0	0	0	0	0	0	0	0	0
Selangor	Total		1	0	0	0	0	0	0	0	1	0
Career total			1	0	0	0	0	0	0	0	1	0

== Honours ==
=== International ===
Malaysia U19

- AFF U-19 Youth Championship : 2022
