= Samuel Somerville =

English professional footballer (born 1994)

Personal information
- Full name: Samuel Jacob Somerville
- Date of birth: 6 August 1994 (age 32)
- Place of birth: Farnborough, England
- Height: 5 ft 9 in (1.75 m)
- Position: Goalkeeper

Team information
- Current team: DPMM FC
- Number: 1

Senior career*
| Years | Team | Apps | (Gls) |
| 2011–2012 | Farnborough | | |
| 2012–2013 | → Godalming Town (loan) | | |
| 2013–2015 | Slough Town | | |
| 2014 | → Badshot Lea (loan) | | |
| 2015 | Tooting & Mitcham | | |
| 2016–2019 | Johor Darul Ta'zim II | 36 | (0) |
| 2020–2021 | Penang | 16 | (0) |
| 2022–2026 | Selangor | 36 | (0) |
| 2026 | → Melaka (loan) | 9 | (0) |
| 2026– | DPMM | 4 | (0) |
- * Club domestic league appearances and goals as of 20 November 2026

Samuel Jacob Somerville (born 6 August 1994) is an English professional footballer who plays as a goalkeeper for Bruneian club DPMM FC of the Malaysia Super League. He has been called up for the Malaysia national team but has never played.

== Club career ==
=== England ===
Somerville started his career playing in the youth team of English sixth tier side Farnborough, where he first met fellow Malaysian player Junior Eldstål, In 2012, he went on a season-long loan to Godalming Town in the Division One Central of the Southern League, after which he made 70-plus appearances for Slough Town and had a season with Tooting & Mitcham United.

=== Malaysia ===
Encouraged by Eldstål, in 2015 Somerville took Malaysian nationality (he has a Malaysian grandmother from Kulim), and moved to Malaysia, making his first appearances in Malaysian League in the 2015 season, after Johor Darul Ta'zim brought him in along with other heritage players such as Curran Ferns, Stuart Wark, Nick Swirad, Kevin Gunter and Daniel Ting. Somerville played four seasons in the Malaysia Premier League for Johor Darul Ta'zim II, who also won the 2019 Challenge Cup, beating UKM FC in the final.

Before the 2020 season, Somerville signed for Malaysian club Penang. Somerville recorded four clean sheets in helping Penang win the 2020 Premier League and only conceded eight times in 11 matches. In Penang's 2021 season he made 16 Super League and two cup appearances.

On 17 December 2021, Somerville switched sides to join Selangor for the 2022 season, making 15 league and four cup appearances, and then 13 league and four cup appearances in the 2023 season.

=== Brunei ===
On 5 July 2026, Somerville was announced as a new signing for DPMM FC alongside Nicholas Swirad, to serve as competition for Haimie Abdullah Nyaring. He made his DPMM debut in a 3–0 away defeat to Johor Darul Ta'zim F.C. on 4 September.

== International career ==
On 10 May 2021, Somerville received a first call-up from Malaysia as third choice keeper for the World Cup qualifying matches against Kuwait, Bahrain, United Arab Emirates, Vietnam and Thailand.

== Honours ==
Godalming Town

- Surrey Senior Cup: 2012–13

Johor Darul Ta'zim II

- Malaysia Challenge Cup: 2019

Penang

- Malaysia Premier League: 2020

Selangor

- Malaysia Cup runner-up: 2022
- Malaysia Super League runner-up: 2023
- MFL Challenge Cup: 2024–25

== Personal life ==
In addition to his playing career, Somerville also started a company, SJS Goalkeeping, marketing goalkeeping gloves in Malaysia and Japan.
