= Mukhairi Ajmal =

Malaysian footballer (born 2001)

Personal information
- Full name: Muhammad Mukhairi Ajmal bin Mahadi
- Date of birth: 7 November 2001 (age 25)
- Place of birth: Sungai Lembing, Pahang, Malaysia
- Height: 1.80 m (5 ft 11 in)
- Positions: Attacking midfielder; winger

Team information
- Current team: Selangor
- Number: 29

Youth career
- –2015: Pahang Malaysia Sports School
- 2016–2018: Tunku Mahkota Ismail Sports School
- 2019: PKNP U21

Senior career*
Years	Team	Apps	(Gls)
2019	PKNP	2	(0)
2020	Selangor II	4	(0)
2020–	Selangor	96	(12)

International career^{‡}
2016–2017	Malaysia U16		
2019–2020	Malaysia U19	8	(1)
2021–	Malaysia U23	7	(3)
2021–	Malaysia	12	(0)
Medal record
Representing Malaysia
Men's football
Merdeka Cup
Runner-up	2023
King's Cup
Runner-up	2022
AFF Championship
Third place	2022
AFF U-19 Youth Championship
Second place	2019 Vietnam
- * Club domestic league appearances and goals as of 27 May 2026 ‡ National team caps and goals as of 22 March 2024

Muhammad Mukhairi Ajmal bin Mahadi (born 7 November 2001) is a Malaysian professional footballer who plays as an attacking midfielder or a winger for Malaysia Super League club Selangor and the Malaysia national team.

Mukhairi began his senior club career playing for PKNP reserve squad, before being promoted to the first team in 2019, aged 18. His individual performances led to a move to Selangor in 2020.

Mukhairi represented Malaysia at the under-19 level, before making his debut for the under-23 level in 2021. He has been called up to the senior Malaysia squad, and made his senior international debut in October 2021.

== Club career ==
=== Early career ===
Born in Sungai Lembing, Pahang, Mukhairi begin his career with attended the Pahang Malaysian Sports School, and trained there until he was 15, before transferring to Tunku Mahkota Ismail Sports School (SSTMI) in Johor for the final two years of his formal secondary education.

=== PKNP ===
Upon graduating at the end of 2018, Mukhairi signed for Super League side PKNP on a one-year contract with an option for an extra year. He making his league and first team debut, against PKNS on 23 February 2019, at the age 17 years, three months and 16 days, coming on as a substitute in the 67th minute. Later, he scored his first professional goal on 29 September 2019 in an 4–1 loss against Kedah at Darulaman Stadium in Malaysia Cup tournament. By this time, his performance was soon attracting attention from several Malaysia Super League clubs, until he was approached by Selangor, who planned to sign him to their reserve team.

=== Selangor ===
On 25 December 2019, Mukhairi moved to joined Selangor, being initially assigned to the Selangor II in Malaysia Premier League. The following 14 July 2020, after made several appearances for reserve team, he was promoted outright by the Red Giants first team. Mukhairi made his first team – and Super League – debut for Selangor on 3 October 2020, starting in a 7–0 away victory over PDRM. On second season with the club, he scored his first goal in the league match against Sri Pahang in a 3–1 win on 6 March 2021. He managed to make a significant impact in most games and came away with a respectable played in twenty games in the league matches and provide one goal and one assist for the club.

In his third season, Mukhairi began wearing the number 7 shirt for Selangor in 2022, signalling coach Michael Feichtenbeiner's intent to use him as his main box-to-box and playmaker. On 1 October, Mukhairi scored with a powerful shot from 25 yards in the 32nd minute against Melaka United. The goal later earned him the Best Goal of the Malaysian League 2022 for the goal of the year. On 16 November, the 21-year-old provided all three assists corner for Richmond Ankrah, Caion and Sharul Nazeem's goal in a 3–1 win against Terengganu at Malaysia Cup semi-final, to take his assist tally to 9. Mukhairi finished his third season with concluding 3 goals and 9 top assist for the club, in 32 appearances across all competitions.

Prior to the 2023 season, Mukhairi was given the squad number 10 following the release of Caion, the club's previous number 10. He joined a famous list of players to wear the number 10, most notably the late Mokhtar Dahari, a legend striker of the squad who hold the record as the top scorer for the club with 177 goals. Mukhairi began the 2023 season firmly established in Selangor's starting line-up. Mukhairi scored his first goals of the new campaign on 15 April 2023, scoring a brace in a 4–0 victory against Sri Pahang in the FA Cup. On 7 June 2023, he scored an opening goal to beat Kelantan United 7–1 at the Sultan Muhammad IV Stadium. He completed the season with 31 appearances, 6 goals and providing 4 assist in all competitions.

After an indifferent 2025–26 season wearing the number 10 shirt, Mukhairi returned to his former number 29 shirt.

== International career ==
=== Youth ===
At the youth international level, Mukhairi was the part of national team under-19 to helped the squad finish runners up in the 2019 AFF U-18 Youth Championship, before helped squad to qualified for the 2020 AFC U-19 Championship finals.

=== Senior ===
On 23 September 2021, Mukhairi received his first call-up to the senior national team, for central training and friendly matches against Jordan and Uzbekistan. He made his senior international debut on 6 October 2021, replacing Nazmi Faiz in the 61st minute of a 4–0 loss against Jordan.

== Style of play ==
Primarily a central midfielder, he is also capable of playing on the left flank, in a holding role, as a deep-lying playmaker, in a box-to-box role, or even as an attacking midfielder. During his season with Selangor, Mukhairi was deployed in a more advanced and creative midfield role rather than in his usual box-to-box role, which saw him gain more time on the ball, and he excelled as the team's main playmaker, due to his vision and passing range. His performances in this role saw him develop from a promising youngster into one of the best and most complete midfielders in Malaysian League. Upon Mukhairi's departure from PKNP in 2020, his former coach, Abu Bakar Fadzim stating that he "...as a young player who has a high level of intellectual intelligence (IQ), and he can even plan a match and think in a short period of time before making a pass". Mukhairi is also effective at taking set pieces, particularly corners or wide free kicks.

== Career statistics ==
=== Club ===
As of 27 May 2026

Appearances and goals by club, season and competition
Club	Season	League			Cup (Note: Appearances in Malaysia FA Cup)		League Cup (Note: Appearances in Malaysia Cup)		Continental		Other		Total	
Club	Season	Division	Apps	Goals	Apps	Goals	Apps	Goals	Apps	Goals	Apps	Goals	Apps	Goals
PKNP	2019	Malaysia Super League	2	0	0	0	2	1	–				4	1
PKNP	Total		2	0	0	0	2	1	–				4	1
Selangor II	2020	Malaysia Premier League	4	0	–								4	0
Selangor II	Total		4	0	0	0	0	0	–				4	0
Selangor	2020	Malaysia Super League	2	0	0	0	0	0	–				2	0
Selangor	2021	Malaysia Super League	20	1	0	0	3	0	–				23	1
Selangor	2022	Malaysia Super League	21	3	4	0	7	0	–				32	3
Selangor	2023	Malaysia Super League	24	3	3	3	4	0	–				31	6
Selangor	2024–25	Malaysia Super League	16	2	2	0	2	0	3 (Note: Appearances in AFC Champions League Two)	0	5 (Note: Appearance(s) in MFL Challenge Cup)	2	28	4
Selangor	2025–26	Malaysia Super League	13	3	3	0	4	0	2	0	4 (Note: Appearance(s) in ASEAN Club Championship)	0	26	3
Selangor	Total		96	12	12	3	20	0	5	0	9	2	142	17
Career Total			102	12	12	3	22	1	5	0	9	2	150	18

=== International ===
As of 22 March 2024

Appearances and goals by national team and year
National team	Year	Apps	Goals
Malaysia	2021	2	0
Malaysia	2022	6	0
Malaysia	2023	4	0
Malaysia	2024	0	0
Total		12	0

No.	Date	Venue	Opponent	Score	Result	Competition
	15 March 2024	UiTM Stadium, Shah Alam, Malaysia	Nepal	5-1	5-1	Friendly^{1}

^{1} Not FIFA 'A' International match.

== Honours ==
Selangor

- Malaysia Cup runner-up: 2022
- MFL Challenge Cup: 2024-25

Malaysia U19

- AFF U-19 Youth Championship runner-up: 2019

Malaysia

- King's Cup runner-up: 2022
- Merdeka Tournament runner-up: 2023
