= Richmond Boakye =

Ghanaian footballer (born 1993)

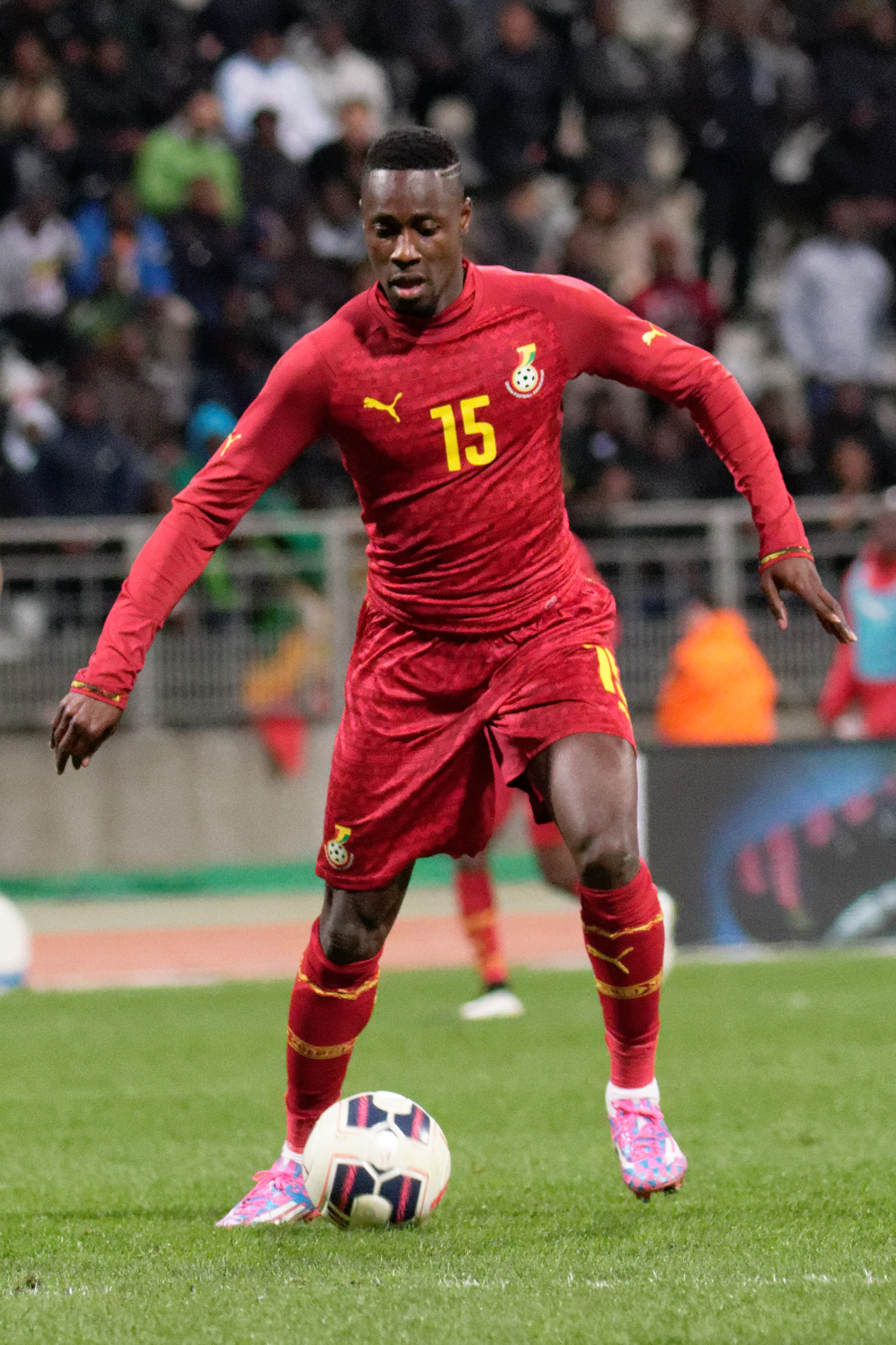
- Boakye with Ghana in 2015

Personal information
- Full name: Richmond Yiadom Boakye
- Date of birth: 28 January 1993 (age 33)
- Place of birth: Sunyani, Ghana
- Height: 1.86 m (6 ft 1 in)
- Position: Striker

Youth career
- 2003–2006: Bechem United
- 2006–2008: D.C. United (Agogo, Ghana)
- 2008–2011: Genoa

Senior career*
Years	Team	Apps	(Gls)
2010–2013	Genoa	6	(1)
2011–2013	→ Sassuolo (loan)	66	(21)
2013–2014	Juventus	0	(0)
2013–2014	→ Elche (loan)	31	(6)
2014–2015	Atalanta	19	(3)
2015	→ Roda (loan)	9	(0)
2016	Latina	33	(4)
2017	Red Star Belgrade	30	(27)
2018	Jiangsu Suning	15	(3)
2018–2020	Red Star Belgrade	33	(16)
2021	Górnik Zabrze	13	(0)
2021–2022	Beitar Jerusalem	27	(6)
2022–2023	Lamia	8	(1)
2023	Al Akhdar	6	(2)
2023	Selangor	11	(6)
2025	Sloga Doboj	5	(1)
Total		313	(97)

International career
2010–2013	Ghana U20	10	(5)
2012–2022	Ghana	19	(7)
Medal record
Representing Ghana
Men's Football
FIFA U-20 World Cup
Third place	2013 Turkey
- * Club domestic league appearances and goals as of 17 May 2025

Richmond Yiadom Boakye (born 28 January 1993) is a Ghanaian professional footballer who plays as a striker.

== Club career ==
=== Early career ===
Born in Accra, Greater Accra, Boakye began his career with Bechem United in his native country of Ghana. He eventually moved to Agogo, Asante Akim North District based club, D.C. United and remained until 2008 when he was scouted by Genoa CFC following a tournament in Vicenza, Italy.

=== Genoa ===
Following his transfer to Genoa in 2009, Boakye spent the 2009–10 Serie A season, playing in the Campionato Nazionale Primavera for the Ligurian club. On 3 April 2010, Boakye made his Serie A debut, in a match against Livorno. He came off the bench as a substitute for David Suazo in the 13th minute and scored the opening goal, and the match ended in a 1–1 draw. On 2 May, he played in his second match, replacing Giuseppe Sculli as a 71st minute substitute. In the process he played often for Genoa's Primavera side, winning the Scudetto, Coppa Italia and two Supercoppa Primavera with the Rossoblu.

=== Sassuolo ===
On 21 June 2011, Boakye officially joined Serie B outfit Sassuolo on a one-year loan deal that proved very successful for the Ghanaian; he managed to score 12 goals in 36 appearances for the club that missed promotion to Serie A via a promotion play-off loss on aggregate to UC Sampdoria during the 2011–12. His loan deal was extended for an extra year for the after signing for Juventus in 2012. The following season, the 2012–13, he scored 11 league goals in 32 league appearances, ended as the club's joint top scorer and helped them to win the Serie B thus achieving direct promotion to Serie A and ensuring a first top-flight campaign ever in the club's history for the 2013–14 season.

=== Juventus ===
His performances for the Neroverde did not go unnoticed, as the player was eventually signed by reigning Serie A champions Juventus FC on a co-ownership deal from Genoa in July 2012. After joining the club, however, he returned to Sassuolo on a second season-long loan deal with the club. Juventus paid nothing in cash but cancelled the transfer debt owed to Genoa with the sale of Ciro Immobile on a similar co-ownership deal in January 2012.

Boakye returned to Juventus on 30 June 2013 but was later loaned to Elche in Spain for the 2013–14 season. He finished the season having scored 6 goals in 31 league appearances (12 starts) for the Spanish club, and returned again to Juventus on 30 June 2014, after the co-ownership with Genoa was renewed just ten days prior.

=== Atalanta ===
On 21 July 2014, Genoa sold half of Boakye's 50% registration rights to Atalanta for €1.3 million, with Juventus retained the other half. On 23 June 2015, Atalanta bought Boakye outright from Juventus for €1.6 million.

On 31 August 2015, Boakye left for Dutch club Roda JC.

=== Latina ===
In January 2016, Boakye was sold to Latina in a temporary deal, with an obligation to sign outright at the end of season for an undisclosed fee.

=== Red Star Belgrade ===
In January 2017, he came on a year-and-a-half loan to a Serbian team Red Star Belgrade. Boakye impressed at Red Star Belgrade with his performances based the time he spent from January to May in the club. He scored an impressive 16 goals in 19 games in all competitions, and won the best player of the week on two occasions within the Serbian Superliga.

The season was marked by fierce rivalry between Red Star and Partizan and the owner of the trophy was decided only in the last round of the championship and ended up in Partizan hands, with Red Star finishing second. He made 18 appearances, spent 1375 minutes in game, and scored 16 goals. He was unable to fight for the league top scorer title as he arrived during winter break and missed the first half of the season. His great performances influenced Ghana national team coach James Kwesi Appiah to ask Boakye to join the Ghana national team as soon as he gets released by Red Star for summer holidays. Boakye also became a free agent on 29 May, after the bankruptcy of Latina.

Red Star Belgrade signed Boakye on a permanent deal on 27 June 2017. He started the season with 5 goals in the first 3 games of qualifying matches of the club in 2017–18 UEFA Europa League. He added two more goals in his fifth and sixth games of Europa League qualifying match appearances.

On 14 December 2017, he was elected by the direction board as the Red Star player of the year in 2017. His performances with Red Star attracted the interest of numerous foreign teams in the winter of 2017–18. Chelsea and their coach Antonio Conte had scouted him closely over the course of the 2017–18 winter transfer window.

=== Jiangsu Suning ===
On 27 February 2018, Boakye was transferred to Jiangsu Suning for a reported €5.5 million fee.

=== Return to Red Star Belgrade ===
On 31 August 2018, Boakye signed a new 2.5-year contract with an optional one-year extension for Red Star in a €2.5 million transfer, just six months after the transfer to Jiangsu Suning. He contributed to Red Star's 2018-19 UEFA Champions League campaign, as the team qualified to the group stage for the first time after 27 years. After becoming the best foreigner goalscorer in the history of the club, Boakye became the first foreigner to wear a Red Star jersey over two separate terms. On 15 September 2018, he scored a brace against Radnik Surdulica in his first match since returning to Red Star. On 23 September 2018, he scored a header against Partizan in the eternal derby, which ended in a 1–1 tie.

=== Górnik Zabrze ===
On 9 February 2021, Boakye signed a short-term contract with Polish football club Górnik Zabrze until the end of the 2020–21 season on a free transfer with an option to extend.

=== Beitar Jerusalem ===
On 20 July 2021, Boakye signed for Beitar Jerusalem on a one-year contract, with an option to extend for a further one year. He left the club at the end of this contract on 30 July 2022.

=== Lamia ===
On 17 August 2022, Boakye has signed for Greek side Lamia on a free transfer for the new season.

=== Al Akhdar SC ===
On 22 January 2023, Boakye has completed a transfer move to Libyan side Al Akhdar SC in the ongoing January transfer window. He made his debut for Al Akhdar on 3 March, in a 1–1 away draw against Al-Suqoor, playing the entire game. He scored his first goal for the club on 9 March, scored a 90th-minute stoppage time equaliser during a 1–1 home draw against Saint-Éloi Lupopo in 2022–23 CAF Confederation Cup.

On 27 May 2023, Boakye has terminated his contract with Al-Akhdar. He made significant contributions, scoring three goals and providing two assists in 11 appearances across all competitions.

=== Selangor ===
On 28 June 2023, Boakye signed for Malaysia Super League side Selangor. On 9 July, he made his debut for the club as a substitute to Ayron del Valle, in a 1–0 loss against Sri Pahang in the league. A week later, he scored his first goal in a league match against Penang, which Selangor won 3–0. Boakye scored his first hat-trick for the club against Kelantan in a massive 2–11 away victory on 25 August 2023.

== International career ==
Boakye received an international call-up by the Ghana national team for the friendly match against China at the Tianhe Stadium in Guangzhou on 15 August 2012. Boakye scored his first goal for Ghana on his debut, an equaliser in the 80th minute of the match. He also played for Ghana at the 2013 FIFA U-20 World Cup, winning the bronze medal.

== Personal life ==
Whilst on loan playing for Elche in the La Liga in 2013, Boakye revealed that he is Real Madrid fan even though when he was growing up everyone in his family supported Manchester United and Barcelona.

== Career statistics ==
=== Club ===
As of match played 13 May 2023

Appearances and goals by club, season and competition
Club	Season	League			Cup		Continental		Other		Total	
Club	Season	Division	Apps	Goals	Apps	Goals	Apps	Goals	Apps	Goals	Apps	Goals
Genoa	2009–10	Serie A	3	1	0	0	–		–		3	1
Genoa	2010–11	Serie A	4	0	1	0	–		–		5	0
Genoa	Total		7	1	1	0	0	0	0	0	8	1
Sassuolo (loan)	2011–12	Serie B	34	10	2	2	–		–		36	12
Sassuolo (loan)	2012–13	Serie B	32	11	0	0	–		–		32	11
Sassuolo (loan)	Total		66	21	2	2	0	0	0	0	68	23
Elche (loan)	2013–14	La Liga	31	6	2	1	–		–		33	7
Atalanta	2014–15	Serie A	19	3	3	2	–		–		22	5
Roda JC (loan)	2015–16	Eredivisie	9	0	1	0	–		–		10	0
Latina	2015–16	Serie B	17	1	0	0	–		–		17	1
Latina	2016–17	Serie B	16	3	0	0	–		–		16	3
Latina	Total		33	4	0	0	0	0	0	0	33	4
Red Star	2016–17	Serbian SuperLiga	16	12	4	4	–		–		20	16
Red Star	2017–18	Serbian SuperLiga	14	15	0	0	14	8	–		28	23
Red Star			30	27	4	4	14	8	0	0	48	39
Jiangsu Suning	2018	Chinese Super League	15	3	1	0	–		–		16	3
Red Star	2018–19	Serbian SuperLiga	15	13	0	0	3	0	–		18	13
Red Star	2019–20	Serbian SuperLiga	10	1	2	1	13	4	–		25	6
Red Star	2020–21	Serbian SuperLiga	8	2	2	0	3	0	–		13	2
Red Star	Total		33	16	4	1	19	4	0	0	56	24
Górnik	2020–21	Ekstraklasa	13	0	1	0	0	0	–		14	0
Beitar Jerusalem	2021–22	Israeli Premier League	27	6	1	0	0	0	1	0	29	6
Lamia	2022–23	Super League Greece	8	1	1	0	0	0	–		9	1
Al Akhdar	2022–23	Libyan Premier League	6	2	2	0	3	1	–		11	3
Selangor	2023	Malaysia Super League	11	6	0	0	–		4	0	15	6
Career total			308	96	23	10	36	13	5	0	372	119

=== International ===
As of match played 18 January 2022

Appearances and goals by national team and year
National team	Year	Apps	Goals
Ghana	2012	3	1
Ghana	2013	4	1
Ghana	2015	4	2
Ghana	2017	3	2
Ghana	2021	2	0
Ghana	2022	3	1
Total		19	7

Scores and results list Ghana's goal tally first, score column indicates score after each Boakye goal.

List of international goals scored by Richmond Boakye
No.	Date	Venue	Opponent	Score	Result	Competition
1	15 August 2012	Shaanxi Province Stadium, Xi'an, China	China	1–1	1–1	Friendly
2	10 January 2013	Al Nahyan Stadium, Abu Dhabi, United Arab Emirates	Egypt	2–0	3–0	Friendly
3	28 March 2015	Stade Océane, Le Havre, France	Senegal	1–2	1–2	Friendly
4	1 September 2015	Stade Municipal de Kintélé, Brazzaville, Congo	Congo	1–1	3–2	Friendly
5	1 September 2017	Stade Municipal de Kintélé, Brazzaville, Congo	Congo	1–0	5–1	2018 FIFA World Cup qualification
6	1 September 2017	Stade Municipal de Kintélé, Brazzaville, Congo	Congo	5–1	5–1	2018 FIFA World Cup qualification
7	18 January 2022	Roumdé Adjia Stadium, Garoua, Cameroon	Comoros	1–2	2–3	2021 Africa Cup of Nations

== Honours ==
Genoa Primavera

- Campionato Nazionale Primavera: 2009–10
- Coppa Italia Primavera: 2008–09
- Supercoppa Primavera: 2009, 2010

Sas

- Serie B: 2012–13

Red Star Belgrade

- Serbian SuperLiga: 2017–18, 2018–19, 2019–20, 2020–21

Ghana U20

- FIFA U-20 World Cup: third place 2013

Individual

- Serbian SuperLiga Player of the week: (2016–2017 Round 27 & 37)(2017–2018 Round 17 & 18) (2018–2019 Round 8)
- Večernje novosti captains' poll Serbian Super Liga Best Player award: 2017–18.
- Red Star Belgrade player of the year: 2017
