= Sharul Nazeem =

Malaysian footballer

Personal information
- Full name: Sharul Nazeem bin Zulpakar
- Date of birth: 16 November 1999 (age 26)
- Place of birth: Gombak, Selangor, Malaysia
- Height: 1.79 m (5 ft 10 in)
- Position: Centre-back

Team information
- Current team: Selangor
- Number: 44

Youth career
- 2017–2018: Marcerra United
- 2018–2019: Selangor III

Senior career*
Years	Team	Apps	(Gls)
2020	Selangor II	11	(0)
2021–	Selangor	77	(4)

International career^{‡}
2017–2018	Malaysia U19	0	(0)
2018–	Malaysia U23	0	(0)
2022–	Malaysia	10	(0)
Medal record
Men's football
Representing Malaysia
Men's football
Merdeka Cup
Runner-up	2023
King's Cup
Runner-up	2022
AFF Championship
Third place	2022
- * Club domestic league appearances and goals as of 27 May 2026 ‡ National team caps and goals as of 9 September 2023

Sharul Nazeem bin Zulpakar (born 16 November 1999) is a Malaysian professional footballer who plays as a centre-back for Malaysia Super League club Selangor and the Malaysia national team.

== Club career ==
=== Early year ===
Sharul was born in Gombak, Selangor. He took his first steps in football to represent local club in third division league, Marcerra United in 2017. The following year, he joined Selangor youth team, and then promoted to the Selangor II, where he managed to play in the first team as a captain, and play all matches at 2020 Malaysia Premier League season, with help the team to reach the seventh-place (7th) in the league.

=== Selangor ===
Sharul was the part of the senior's team after being called by Selangor II team head coach, Michael Feichtenbeiner, to represent for 2020 Malaysia Cup tournament. On 2 December 2020, Selangor confirmed that Sharul would be definitely promoted to senior's first team for the 2021 season. He made his debut for the club on 6 April 2021, playing full 90-minutes with a 1–2 loss against Kedah Darul Aman in Super League matches. On 3 August 2021, Shahrul scored his first goal for the club against UiTM in 2–0 win at Super League matches.

== International career ==
=== Youth ===
Sharul has represented Malaysia youth level from the under 19-side to the under-23 sides. He never makes any appearance during that time.

=== Senior ===
In October 2021, Sharul receives his first callup for senior team ahead of friendly against Jordan and Uzbekistan but he pulled up because of hamstring injury. On 10 March 2022, he received another callup for senior team from new appointed headcoach Kim Pan Gon ahead friendly matches against Philippines and Singapore. He however didn't make it into the finalised squad.

On 25 September 2022, Sharul made his debut for the national team in a penalty shoot-out defeat against Tajikistan in King's Cup final.

== Career statistics ==
=== Club ===
As of 27 May 2026

Appearances and goals by club, season and competition
Club	Season	League			Cup (Note: Includes Malaysia FA Cup)		League Cup (Note: Includes Malaysia Cup)		Continental		Other		Total	
Club	Season	Division	Apps	Goals	Apps	Goals	Apps	Goals	Apps	Goals	Apps	Goals	Apps	Goals
Selangor II	2020	Malaysia Premier League	11	0	0	0	—						11	0
Selangor II	Total		11	0	0	0	0	0	0	0	0	0	11	0
Selangor	2020	Malaysia Super League	0	0	0	0	0	0	—				0	0
Selangor	2021	Malaysia Super League	14	1	0	0	5	0	—				19	1
Selangor	2022	Malaysia Super League	18	0	4	0	6	1	—				28	1
Selangor	2023	Malaysia Super League	21	3	1	0	3	0	—				25	3
Selangor	2024–25	Malaysia Super League	19	0	6	0	0	0	3 (Note: Appearances in AFC Champions League Two)	0	5 (Note: Appearance(s) in MFL Challenge Cup)	1	33	1
Selangor	2025–26	Malaysia Super League	5	0	2	0	0	0	2	0	2 (Note: Appearance(s) in ASEAN Club Championship)	0	11	0
Selangor	Total		77	4	13	0	14	1	5	0	7	1	116	6
Career total			88	4	13	0	14	1	5	0	7	1	127	6

=== International ===
As of 9 September 2023

Appearances and goals by national team, year and competition
National Team	Year	Competitive		Friendly		Total	
National Team	Year	Apps	Goals	Apps	Goals	Apps	Goals
Malaysia	2022	3	0	3	0	6	0
Malaysia	2023	3	0	1	0	4	0
Total		6	0	4	0	10	0

== Honours ==
Selangor

- Malaysia Cup runner-up: 2022
- Malaysia Super League runner-up: 2023
- MFL Challenge Cup: 2024-25
