= Ayron del Valle =

Colombian footballer (born 1989)

Personal information
- Full name: Ayron del Valle Rodríguez
- Date of birth: 27 January 1989 (age 37)
- Place of birth: Cartagena, Colombia
- Height: 1.75 m (5 ft 9 in)
- Position: Centre-forward

Team information
- Current team: Alianza
- Number: 77

Senior career*
Years	Team	Apps	(Gls)
2006	Expreso Rojo	20	(2)
2007	Real Cartagena	25	(6)
2008–2009	Independiente Medellín	24	(3)
2009	→ Real Cartagena (loan)	12	(0)
2010–2011	Atlético Huila	57	(12)
2011–2012	Once Caldas	34	(4)
2012	Deportivo Pasto	24	(4)
2013	Independiente Medellín	14	(2)
2013	Deportes Tolima	14	(1)
2014	Alianza Petrolera	34	(15)
2015–2016	América de Cali	6	(1)
2016–2018	Millonarios	127	(44)
2019	Querétaro	31	(6)
2020	Millonarios	25	(7)
2021	Juarez	13	(0)
2022	Venados	10	(3)
2022	Once Caldas	38	(12)
2023	Selangor	33	(24)
2024	Always Ready	19	(4)
2024–2025	La Equidad	24	(4)
2025–	Alianza	12	(1)
- * Club domestic league appearances and goals as of 12 December 2025

Ayron del Valle Rodríguez (born 27 January 1989) is a Colombian professional footballer who plays as a forward for Categoría Primera A club Alianza.

== Honours ==
Millonarios

- Categoría Primera A: 2017
- Superliga Colombiana: 2018

Selangor

- Malaysia Super League runner-up: 2023

Individual

- Categoría Primera B Top goalscorer: 2015
- Categoría Primera A Top goalscorer: 2016
- Categoría Primera A Top goalscorer: 2017
- Malaysia Super League Top goalscorer: 2023

== Career statistics ==
Club	Season	League			Cup		Continental		Other		Total	
Club	Season	Div.	Apps	Goals	Apps	Goals	Apps	Goals	Apps	Goals	Apps	Goals
Expreso Rojo	2006	Categoría Primera B	20	2	—		—		—		20	2
Real Cartagena	2007	Categoría Primera A	25	6	—		—		—		25	6
Real Cartagena	2009	Categoria Primera A	12	0	3	3	—		—		15	3
Real Cartagena	Total		37	6	3	3	0	0	0	0	40	9
Independiente Medellín	2008	Categoria Primera A	9	1	0	0	0	0	—		9	1
Independiente Medellín	2009	Categoria Primera A	15	2	2	2	1	0	0	0	18	4
Independiente Medellín	2013	Categoria Primera A	6	0	8	2	—		—		14	2
Independiente Medellín	Total		30	3	10	4	1	0	0	0	41	7
Atlético Huila	2010	Categoria Primera A	35	8	0	0	4	0	0	0	39	8
Atlético Huila	2011	Categoria Primera A	17	3	6	0	0	0	—		23	3
Atlético Huila	Total		52	11	6	0	4	0	0	0	62	11
Once Caldas	2011	Categoría Primera A	21	4	—		—		—		21	4
Once Caldas	2012	Categoría Primera A	11	0	6	1	2	0	0	0	19	1
Once Caldas	Total		32	4	6	1	2	0	0	0	40	5
Deportivo Pasto	2012	Categoria Primera A	12	3	7	2	0	0	—		19	5
Deportes Tolima	2013	Categoría Primera A	10	0	1	4	1	0	—		14	1
Alianza Petrolera	2014	Categoría Primera A	32	15	6	3	1	0	—		35	16
América de Cali	2012	Categoría Primera B	39	30	0	2	0	0	—		41	30
América de Cali	2016	Categoría Primera B	13	0	0	2	1	0	—		15	1
América de Cali	Total		52	30	0	4	1	0	–	–	56	31
Millonarios	2016	Categoría Primera A	20	12	2	2	0	0	—		22	12
Millonarios	2017	Categoría Primera A	46	16	7	3	0	0	2	0	51	16
Millonarios	2018	Categoría Primera A	30	8	9	5	0	0	9	6	44	14
Millonarios	Total		96	37	18	9	0	0	11	6	117	42
Career Total			373	110	37	53	13	0	18	6	444	129
