= 2024–25 Selangor F.C. season =

2024–25 season of Malaysian association football club

Selangor
2024–25 season
- Chairman: Tengku Amir Shah
- Manager: Mahfizul Rusydin
- Head coach: Tan Cheng Hoe (until 28 February); Nidzam Jamil (interim; 28 February – 16 March) (permanent; 16 March – 30 October); Abdifitaah Hassan (interim; 30 October – 24 November); Katsuhito Kinoshi (from 24 November)
- Stadium: MBPJ Stadium
- Super League: 2nd
- FA Cup: Runners-up
- Malaysia Cup: Round of 16
- Challenge Cup: Winners
- Charity Shield: Cancelled (Note: The match officially cancelled by the Malaysian Football League following Selangor's withdrawal due to safety concerns.)
- AFC Champions League Two: Group stage (3rd)
- Top goalscorer: League: (10 goals); Alvin Fortes; Ronnie Fernández; All: (20 goals); Alvin Fortes
- Highest home attendance: 10,569; FA Cup; Selangor vs Terengganu (3 August 2024)
- Lowest home attendance: 1,397; Challenge Cup; Selangor vs Kelantan Darul Naim (22 December 2024)
- Average home league attendance: 6,550
- Biggest win: 7–0 vs Kelantan Darul Naim (A), 8 March 2025, Super League
- Biggest defeat: 1–6 vs Johor Darul Ta'zim (N), 24 August 2024, FA Cup
Home colours	Away colours	Third colours

The 2024–25 season was Selangor's 19th season in the Super League and their 39th consecutive season in the top flight of Malaysian football. The club also participated in the Charity Shield, Malaysia Cup, the FA Cup and the AFC Champions League Two, entering the AFC competition for the first time since the 2016 season.

Selangor remain playing the entire season at the MBPJ Stadium, while the Shah Alam Stadium was undergoing a major renovation and rebuild work. The season was the first since 2020 without former captain Brendan Gan, who departed to Kuala Lumpur City.

== Kits ==
- Supplier: Joma
- Sponsor: PKNS & MBI (front) / KHIND (shoulder)

Home	Away	Third	ACL Two Home	ACL Two Away
Goalkeeper 1	Goalkeeper 2	Goalkeeper 3	Goalkeeper ACL Two 1	Goalkeeper ACL Two 2

== Review ==
This is the first season for the club have a two-year schedule, instead of an all-year-round schedule since the 2007–08 season. On 22 December 2023, Malaysian Football League (MFL) announced the 2024–25 Malaysian League new season, with the kick-off date will begin on 3–5 May 2024, until April 2025 following the league's move align the domestic season to the new AFC calendar. However, following the change of the inspection date from FIFA for the Video Assistant Referee (VAR) system which was previously scheduled for February 2024 to a new date of 16 to 21 April 2024, the kick-off date of the 2024–25 Malaysian League has been moved by a week to allow the MFL to hold VAR system test match series.

Selangor entering the 2024–25 AFC Champions League Two after finished second in the Super League last season, returning to AFC competition for the first time since the 2016 season. The red giants enter the Asia's new second-tier club football tournament organized by the AFC, after the origin tournament AFC Cup is set to be discontinued after the end of the 2023–24 season. Selangor contested the Charity Shield against domestic treble winners Johor Darul Ta'zim (JDT). This will be the team's 15th Charity Shield appearance, and it will be their first debut since 2016. However, Selangor decided to withdraw from the Charity Shield match due to safety concerns, following a series of criminal incidents and threats involving several players and team officials, including main winger Faisal Halim, who was a victim of criminal activity and suffered fourth-degree burns after being attacked with acid. Following Selangor's withdrawal, the MFL officially cancelled the match and awarded Johor Darul Ta'zim as the winner of the Charity Shield by a walkover victory.

Following the case of their withdrawal, Selangor was fined RM100,000 and docked three points by the MFL on 25 June 2024, included to pay compensation for the losses incurred by JDT as the host team for the opening match of the season. In addition, Super League match between both teams at the MBPJ Stadium will be played without spectators. The club are appealing against the decision. Two days later, the MFL reconsidered the decision to reduce the punishment, despite Selangor has not submitted any appeal yet. The MFL has reduced RM100,000 fined to RM60,000. Besides, the three points deduction was cancelled and the spectator entry ban also been lifted, despite the compensation payments to JDT and MFL will be maintained. However, the club stay to file an appeal against the revised decisions made by the MFL. The club's been given a three-days window, effective from 27 June 2024, to formally submit their appeal.

On 1 February 2024, Selangor confirmed the departure of several players whose contracts had expired, including former captain Brendan Gan, who also departed after four seasons with the club. On 28 February 2024, Selangor announced that head coach Tan Cheng Hoe had left the club by mutual agreement, despite having an existing contract with the club. Nidzam Jamil, formerly assistant head coach under Cheng Hoe, has been appointed as interim head coach until a permanent replacement is secured. On 16 March, the club announced that Nidzam Jamil will remain and take over as Selangor new head coach on a permanent basis. After a half-year in charge, Nidzam Jamil left the club by mutual consent on 30 October 2024, despite successfully managing the teams and maintaining their top form in competitions. Assistant head-coach Abdifitaah Hassan will take charge as interim until the club finalises the recruitment of a new head coach. On 23 November, Selangor announce the appointment of former Serbia national team assistant coach Katsuhito Kinoshi as the new head coach until the end of the season. A week later, Selangor announce the arrival of new assistant head coach Jun Marques Davidson that join the club as part of Kinoshi’s backroom team.

The season was one of ups and downs, with the team ending their Champions League Two group stage in third place, meaning that they were eliminated and failed to advance to the knockout stage. Elsewhere, Selangor finished as runners-up in the FA Cup, and was eliminated in the round of 16 of the Malaysia Cup. Despite, the club clinched their first trophy since 2015 by defeating PDRM 7–0 on aggregate in the MFL Challenge Cup final. Selangor finished their league campaign in the second position, qualifying for the next season's Champions League Two. Overall, Selangor played a total of 44 competitive matches in all competitions, with 22 wins, 12 draws, and 10 losses.

== Players ==
=== First-team ===
No.	Player	Nat.	Position(s)	Date of birth (age)	Signed	Signed from	Noted
Goalkeepers
1	Khairulazhan Khalid	(Malaysia)	GK	7 November 1989 (aged 35)	2015	Pahang	
20	Azim Al-Amin	(Malaysia)	GK	20 September 2001 (aged 23)	2024	Kuala Lumpur City	
23	Samuel Somerville	(Malaysia)	GK	6 August 1994 (aged 30)	2021	Penang	
33	Kalamullah Al-Hafiz	(Malaysia)	GK	30 July 1995 (aged 29)	2024	Kedah Darul Aman	
Defenders
2	Quentin Cheng	(Malaysia) (Australia)	RB / RWB	20 November 1999 (aged 25)	2020	(Australia) Sutherland Sharks	
3	Mohammad Abualnadi	(Jordan) (United States)	CB / LB / LWB	8 February 2001 (aged 24)	2024	(Iraq) Al-Qasim	
14	Zikri Khalili	(Malaysia)	LB / RB	25 June 2002 (aged 22)	2020	Selangor U-23	
18	Khuzaimi Piee	(Malaysia)	CB / LB	11 November 1993 (aged 31)	2022	Negeri Sembilan	
19	V. Ruventhiran	(Malaysia)	LB / LWB / LM	24 August 2001 (aged 23)	2022	Petaling Jaya City	
21	Safuwan Baharudin (C)	(Singapore)	CB / DM / CM	22 September 1991 (aged 33)	2023	Negeri Sembilan	
22	Fazly Mazlan	(Malaysia)	LB / LWB	22 December 1993 (aged 31)	2021	Johor Darul Ta'zim	
44	Sharul Nazeem	(Malaysia)	CB	16 November 1999 (aged 25)	2021	Selangor U-23	
55	Harith Haiqal	(Malaysia)	CB / DM	22 June 2002 (aged 22)	2021	Selangor U-23	
Midfielders
6	Nooa Laine	(Malaysia) (Finland)	AM / CM / DM	22 November 2002 (aged 22)	2024	(Finland) SJK Seinäjoki	(Note: On loan before moving permanently on 5 November 2024.)
8	Noor Al-Rawabdeh	(Jordan)	CM / DM	24 February 1997 (aged 28)	2023	(Jordan) Al-Faisaly	
10	Mukhairi Ajmal	(Malaysia)	CM / LM / LW / AM	7 November 2001 (aged 23)	2019	PKNP	
16	Yohandry Orozco	(Venezuela)	CM / AM / LW / RW	19 March 1991 (aged 34)	2023	(Colombia) Deportes Tolima	
24	Alex Agyarkwa	(Ghana)	CM / DM	18 July 2000 (aged 24)	2021	(Ghana) Accra Lions	
25	Nikola Jambor	(Croatia)	DM / CM	25 September 1995 (aged 29)	2024	(Saudi Arabia) Hajer	
43	Syahir Bashah	(Malaysia)	LM / RM / AM	16 September 2001 (aged 23)	2022	Perak	
76	Aliff Izwan	(Malaysia)	CM / AM / CF	10 February 2004 (aged 21)	2023	Selangor U-23	
77	Aliff Haiqal	(Malaysia)	CM / LM / RM	11 July 2000 (aged 24)	2020	PKNS	
Forwards
7	Faisal Halim	(Malaysia)	LW / RW / LM / RM	7 January 1998 (aged 27)	2022	Terengganu	
9	Ronnie Fernández	(Chile)	CF / LW	30 January 1991 (aged 34)	2024	(Bolivia) Bolívar	
11	Alvin Fortes	(Cape Verde)	RW / LW / AM	25 May 1994 (aged 30)	2024	(Thailand) Ratchaburi	
17	Danial Asri	(Malaysia)	LW / LM / CF	1 April 2000 (aged 25)	2021	Selangor U-23	
90	Ali Olwan	(Jordan)	CF / LW / RW	26 March 2000 (aged 25)	2024	(Qatar) Al-Shamal	
Out on loan
30	Hein Htet Aung	(Myanmar)	RW / LW / RM / LM	5 October 2001 (aged 23)	2021	(Myanmar) Hantharwady United	
—	Azrin Afiq	(Malaysia)	LB / LM / CB	2 January 2000 (aged 25)	2020	Selangor U-23	
—	Sikh Izhan Nazrel	(Malaysia)	GK	23 March 2002 (aged 23)	2021	Selangor U-23	
Player left the club during the season
92	Umar Eshmurodov	(Uzbekistan)	CB	30 November 1992 (aged 32)	2024	(Uzbekistan) Nasaf	
99	Reziq Bani Hani	(Jordan)	CF / LW / RW	28 January 2002 (aged 22)	2024	(Jordan) Al-Faisaly	

=== Reserve Team ===
No.	Player	Nat.	Position(s)	Date of birth (age)	Signed	Signed from	Noted
Selangor U-23
4	Aiman Hakimi	(Malaysia)	CB / RB	28 January 2005 (aged 20)	2024	Selangor U-23	(Note: Promoted from Reserve team.)
29	Faiz Amer	(Malaysia)	CB / RB	15 February 2003 (aged 22)	2024	Selangor U-23	
30	Raimi Shamsul	(Malaysia)	RB / RM	28 October 2002 (aged 22)	2024	Selangor U-23	
31	Harry Danish	(Malaysia)	RW / LW	29 April 2004 (aged 21)	2024	Selangor U-23	
32	Haykal Danish	(Malaysia)	RW / LW	5 May 2005 (aged 19)	2024	Selangor U-23	
71	Haiqal Haqeemi	(Malaysia)	CM	4 November 2003 (aged 21)	2024	Selangor U-23	
Out on loan
28	Muhammad Khalil	(Malaysia)	DM	11 April 2005 (aged 20)	2024	Selangor U-23	
33	Richmond Ankrah	(Ghana)	CB	22 February 2000 (aged 25)	2022	(Ghana) Accra Lions	
66	Syahmi Adib Haikal	(Malaysia)	GK	30 March 2003 (aged 22)	2022	Selangor U-23	

== Transfers ==
=== Transfers in ===
Date	Pos.	No.	Player	Age	From	Type	Fee	Team	Ref.
30 November 2022	DF	3	(Malaysia) Azrin Afiq	23	(Malaysia) Kedah Darul Aman	Loan return	N/A	First team	N/A
30 November 2022	MF	6	(Malaysia) Zahril Azri	24	(Malaysia) Penang	Loan return	N/A	First team	N/A
30 November 2022	GK	25	(Malaysia) Sikh Izhan Nazrel	21	(Malaysia) Negeri Sembilan	Loan return	N/A	First team	N/A
30 November 2022	MF	30	(Myanmar) Hein Htet Aung	22	(Malaysia) Negeri Sembilan	Loan return	N/A	First team	N/A
2 February 2024	DF	92	(Uzbekistan) Umar Eshmurodov	31	(Uzbekistan) Nasaf	Contract expired	Free transfer	First team	
3 February 2024	FW	9	(Chile) Ronnie Fernández	33	(Bolivia) Bolívar	Contract expired	Free transfer	First team	
4 February 2024	FW	11	(Cape Verde) Alvin Fortes	29	(Thailand) Ratchaburi	Contract expired	Free transfer	First team	
5 February 2024	GK	20	(Malaysia) Azim Al-Amin	22	(Malaysia) Kuala Lumpur City	Contract expired	Free transfer	First team	
4 May 2024	FW	99	(Jordan) Reziq Bani Hani	22	(Jordan) Al-Faisaly	Transfer	Undisclosed (Note: Fee reported as RM50,000 (€10,000).)	First team	
5 August 2024 (Note: Join the squad on 26 August 2024, according to the second transfer window date.)	FW	90	(Jordan) Ali Olwan	24	(Qatar) Al-Shamal	Contract expired	Free transfer	First team	
16 September 2024	GK	33	(Malaysia) Kalamullah Al-Hafiz	29	(Malaysia) Kedah Darul Aman	Contract termination (Note: Players become free agent after contract termination by mutual consent.)	Free transfer	First team	
25 September 2024 (Note: Signed before the second transfer window deadline.)	DF	3	(Jordan) Mohammad Abualnadi	23	(Iraq) Al-Qasim	Contract termination	Free transfer	First team	
30 September 2024	MF	25	(Croatia) Nikola Jambor	29	(Saudi Arabia) Hajer	Contract expired	Free transfer	First team	
5 November 2024	MF	6	(Malaysia) Nooa Laine	21	(Finland) SJK Seinäjoki	Transfer	Undisclosed	First team	
31 December 2024	MF	28	(Malaysia) Muhammad Khalil	19	(Japan) FC Osaka	Loan return	N/A	Reserve team	

=== Transfers out ===
Date	Pos.	No.	Player	Age	To	Type	Fee	Team	Ref.
1 February 2024	MF	6	(Malaysia) Zahril Azri	24	(Malaysia) Kuala Lumpur Rovers	Contract expired	Free transfer	First team	
1 February 2024	FW	9	(Ghana) Richmond Boakye	31	(Bosnia and Herzegovina) Sloga Meridian (Note: Joined FK Sloga Meridian on 20 January 2025.)	Contract expired	Free transfer	First team	
1 February 2024	FW	20	(Ghana) Rauf Salifu	21	(United States) Soda City (Note: Joined Soda City FC on 1 May 2024.)	Contract expired	Free transfer	First team	
1 February 2024	FW	70	(Colombia) Ayron del Valle	34	(Bolivia) Always Ready	Contract expired	Free transfer	First team	
1 February 2024	MF	88	(Malaysia) Brendan Gan	35	(Malaysia) Kuala Lumpur City	Contract expired	Free transfer	First team	
11 September 2024	FW	99	(Jordan) Reziq Bani Hani	22	(Jordan) Al-Hussein	Transfer	Undisclosed	First team	
27 December 2024	DF	92	(Uzbekistan) Umar Eshmurodov	32	(Uzbekistan) Nasaf	Contract expired	Free transfer	First team	

=== Loans in ===
Date	Pos.	No.	Player	Age	Loaned from	Type	On loan until	Fee	Team	Ref.
9 February 2024	MF	6	(Malaysia) Nooa Laine	21	(Finland) SJK Seinäjoki	Loan	End of season	Undisclosed	First team	

=== Loans out ===
Date	Pos.	No.	Player	Age	Loaned to	Type	On loan until	Fee	Team	Ref.
22 February 2024	GK	25	(Malaysia) Sikh Izhan Nazrel	21	(Malaysia) Penang	Loan	End of season	None	First team	
7 March 2024	MF	30	(Myanmar) Hein Htet Aung	22	(Malaysia) Negeri Sembilan	Loan	End of season	None	First team	
9 March 2024	GK	66	(Malaysia) Syahmi Adib Haikal	20	(Malaysia) Negeri Sembilan	Loan	End of season	None	Reserve team	
13 March 2024	DF	3	(Malaysia) Azrin Afiq	24	(Malaysia) Negeri Sembilan	Loan	End of season	None	First team	
28 March 2024	DF	33	(Ghana) Richmond Ankrah	24	(Malaysia) Penang	Loan	End of season	None	Reserve team	
5 July 2024	MF	28	(Malaysia) Muhammad Khalil	19	(Japan) FC Osaka	Loan	Six-month	None	Reserve team	
17 January 2025	MF	28	(Malaysia) Muhammad Khalil	19	(Thailand) Nakhon Pathom United	Loan	End of season	None	Reserve team	

== Pre-season and friendlies ==
On 2 March, Selangor announced they would travel to the Thailand for two pre-season friendlies in preparation for the new season. Later, Selangor announced two further friendlies with behind-closed-doors against Negeri Sembilan and the traditional friendly at Perak. On 18 April, Selangor announced the Asia Challenge pre-season tournament with several teams from Southeast Asia invited to compete the tournament. During the international break, Selangor resumed their tour, to compete in the RCTI Premium Sports competition in Jakarta, Indonesia.

5 March 2024 Friendly	Samut Prakan City (Thailand)	0–6	(Malaysia) Selangor	Bang Sao Thong, Samut Prakan
16:00 UTC+7		Report	Harith (?); Mukhairi (?); Faisal (?); Fernández (?)	Stadium: Samut Prakan Stadium

6 March 2024 Friendly	Ayutthaya United (Thailand)	1–1	(Malaysia) Selangor	Pathum Thani, Bangkok
16:00 UTC+7	João Paulo (?)	Report	(?)	Stadium: BGPU Training Centre
Note: The match was on behind-closed-doors.

17 April 2024 Friendly	Selangor (Malaysia)	1–0	(Malaysia) Negeri Sembilan	Shah Alam
17:00 UTC+8	Fortes 2'	Report		Stadium: Selangor FC Training Centre
Note: The match was on behind-closed-doors.

20 April 2024 Friendly	Perak (Malaysia)	2–3	(Malaysia) Selangor	Ipoh
21:00 UTC+8	Zack 30'; Lee 84'	Report	Fortes 49'; Faisal 53'; Orozco 77'	Stadium: Perak Stadium

26 April 2024 Asia Challenge	Selangor (Malaysia)	4–0	(Brunei) DPMM	Petaling Jaya
21:00 UTC+8	Noor 14', 56'; Fortes 30', 67'; Safuwan (yellow card) 51'	Report	Syafiq (yellow card) 23'	Stadium: MBPJ Stadium; Referee: Razlan Joffri Ali

28 April 2024 Asia Challenge	Selangor (Malaysia)	4–0	(Laos) Young Elephants	Petaling Jaya
20:30 UTC+8	Fortes 9'; Safuwan 35'; Faisal 53'; Syahir 74'	Report	Sisavath (yellow card) 22'; Phomvongsa (yellow card) 70'	Stadium: MBPJ Stadium; Referee: Fusser Mad Sallih

3 May 2024 Friendly	Selangor (Malaysia)	7–0	(Singapore) Geylang International	Petaling Jaya
21:00 UTC+8	Mukhairi 12', 39'; Fortes 36', 60'; Orozco 48'; Danial 71'; Haiqal 76'	Report		Stadium: MBPJ Stadium

30 May 2024 RCTI Premium Sports	Sabah (Malaysia)	2–3	(Malaysia) Selangor	Jakarta
17:00 UTC+7	Jafri 62'; Saddil 63'	Report	Aliff 45'; Park 45+3' (o.g.); Orozco 70'	Stadium: Jakarta International Stadium; Referee: Heru Cahyono (Indonesia)

2 June 2024 RCTI Premium Sports	Persija Jakarta (Indonesia)	0–1	(Malaysia) Selangor	Jakarta
19:35 UTC+7		Report	Fortes 3'	Stadium: Jakarta International Stadium; Referee: Asep Yandis (Indonesia)

17 August 2024 Sultan of Selangor's Cup	Selangor (Malaysia)	2–1	(Singapore) SPL Selection	Kuala Lumpur
21:00 UTC+8	Fernández 82'; Fortes 90+1'	Report	Faris 87'	Stadium: Merdeka Stadium; Referee: Ngo Dyu Lan (Vietnam)

== Competitions ==
=== Overall record ===
Competition	First match	Last match	Starting round	Final position	Record							
Competition	First match	Last match	Starting round	Final position	Pld	W	D	L	GF	GA	GD	Win %
Super League (Note: Includes the Charity Shield.)	18 May 2024	19 April 2025	Matchday 1	2nd	24	16	4	4	44	16	+28	66.67
FA Cup	15 June 2024	24 August 2024	Round of 16	Runners-up	6	3	0	3	15	14	+1	50.00
Malaysia Cup	23 November 2024	1 December 2024	Round of 16	Round of 16	2	0	1	1	2	3	−1	0.00
MFL Challenge Cup	12 December 2024	22 February 2025	Quarter-finals	Winners	6	6	0	0	17	3	+14	100.00
AFC Champions League Two	19 September 2024	5 December 2024	Group stage	Group stage (3rd)	6	3	1	2	9	5	+4	50.00
Total					44	28	6	10	87	41	+46	63.64

Source: Soccerway

=== Charity Shield ===
Having finished second in the 2023 Super League, Selangor faced domestic treble winners Johor Darul Ta'zim in the Charity Shield. That match was also the first game in the league for both teams. On 8 May, Selangor announced their withdrawal from the match due to safety concerns, following receiving threats and series of criminal acts involving players and team officials.

10 May 2024	Johor Darul Ta'zim	3–0 (w/o)	Selangor	Iskandar Puteri
21:00 UTC+08:00				Stadium: Sultan Ibrahim Stadium; Referee: Nazmi Nasaruddin
Note: Following Selangor's withdrawal, the Malaysian Football League officially cancelled the match and awarded Johor Darul Ta'zim as the winner of 2024 Charity Shield, and be given a 'walkover' victory with a score of 3–0.

=== Super League ===
==== Table ====
Pos	Team	Pld	W	D	L	GF	GA	GD	Pts	Qualification or relegation
1	Johor Darul Ta'zim (C)	24	23	1	0	90	8	+82	70	Qualification for the AFC Champions League Elite league stage & ASEAN Club Championship
2	Selangor	24	16	4	4	44	16	+28	52	Qualification for the AFC Champions League Two group stage & ASEAN Club Championship (Note: Since the winners of the 2024 Malaysia FA Cup (Johor Darul Ta'zim) qualified for AFC competition based on their league positions, the berth is awarded to the 2nd-placed team in the league.)
3	Sabah	24	11	7	6	41	33	+8	40	
4	Kuching City	24	10	9	5	38	28	+10	39	
5	Terengganu	24	9	8	7	35	26	+9	35	

Source: MFL
Rules for classification: 1) Points; 2) Goal difference; 3) Goals scored;
(C) Champions

==== Results summary ====
Overall								Home						Away					
Pld	W	D	L	GF	GA	GD	Pts	W	D	L	GF	GA	GD	W	D	L	GF	GA	GD
24	16	4	4	44	16	+28	52	10	1	1	23	5	+18	6	3	3	21	11	+10

Source: Super League fixtures and results

==== Results by matchday ====
Round	1	2	3	4	5	6	7	8	9	10	11	12	13	14	15	16	17	18	19	20	21	22	23	24
Ground	A	H	H	H	A	H	A	H	A	H	A	A	H	A	A	A	H	A	H	H	A	A	H	H
Result	C	W	W	W	L	W	D	W	W	W	W	D	L	W	W	W	W	D	W	D	W	L	W	W
Position	13	6	4	2	2	2	2	2	2	2	2	2	2	2	2	2	2	2	2	2	2	2	2	2

Source: Super League fixtures and results
A = Away; H = Home; W = Win; D = Draw; L = Loss; C = Cancelled

==== Matches ====
The league fixtures were announced on 9 April 2024.

Win Draw Loss

10 May 2024 1	Johor Darul Ta'zim	3–0 (w/o)	Selangor	Iskandar Puteri
21:00 UTC+08:00				Stadium: Sultan Ibrahim Stadium; Attendance: — Referee: Nazmi Nasaruddin
Note: Following Selangor's withdrawal, the Malaysian Football League officially cancelled the match and awards Johor Darul Ta'zim a 'walkover' victory with a score of 3–0 and get 3 points for the Super League match.

18 May 2024 2	Selangor	1–0	Kedah Darul Aman	Petaling Jaya
20:15 UTC+08:00	Sharul (yellow card) 38'; Aliff 85'	Report (1); Report (2)	Nordé (yellow card) 45+1'; Akmal (yellow card) 79'	Stadium: MBPJ Stadium; Attendance: 10,077; Referee: Fitri Maskon

26 May 2024 3	Selangor	4–0	Negeri Sembilan	Petaling Jaya
20:15 UTC+08:00	Fazly (yellow card) 26'; Fernández 57'; Noor 67'; Orozco 76'; Reziq 90+1'	Report (1); Report (2)		Stadium: MBPJ Stadium; Attendance: 10,365; Referee: Amirul Izwan Yaacob
Note: The Malaysian Football League has approved Negeri Sembilan's venue change application, as their current home, Tuanku Abdul Rahman Stadium, still under renovation. The change of venue was also agreed upon by both teams.

23 June 2024 4	Selangor	2–1	Perak	Petaling Jaya
17:30 UTC+08:00	Fernández 24', 40' (pen.); Agyarkwa (red card) 64'; Harith (yellow card) 87'	Report (1); Report (2)	Kanybekov (yellow card) 30'; Azalinullah (yellow card) 45+2'; Azfar 78'; Lee (yellow card) 82'	Stadium: MBPJ Stadium; Attendance: 10,112; Referee: Ahmad Zuhadi Dzulkifli

14 July 2024 5	Kuala Lumpur City	1–0	Selangor	Cheras
20:15 UTC+08:00	Gallifuoco (yellow card) 8'; Zhafri (yellow card) 50'; Motika 63'; Pallraj (yellow card) 71'; Lambert (yellow card) 77'; Anwar (yellow card) 90'	Report (1); Report (2)	Harith (yellow card) 45+5'; Zikri (yellow card) 72'; Aliff (yellow card) 90+1'	Stadium: Kuala Lumpur Stadium; Attendance: 4,248; Referee: Usaid Jamal

27 July 2024 6	Selangor	4–1	Penang	Petaling Jaya
20:15 UTC+08:00	Mukhairi 3'; Safuwan (yellow card) 61'; Orozco 70' (pen.); Fortes 89'; Cheng 90+9'	Report (1); Report (2)	Namathevan (yellow card) 30'; Vitor 64' (pen.) (yellow card) 88'	Stadium: MBPJ Stadium; Attendance: 8,965; Referee: Ahmad Zuhadi Dzulkifli

31 July 2024 7	Sri Pahang	1–1	Selangor	Temerloh
20:15 UTC+08:00	Brundo 43'; Hidalgo (yellow card) 45+1'; Zarif (yellow card) 45+5'; Ahapov (red card) 62'; Saiful (yellow card) 81'; Agüero (yellow card) 83'	Report (1); Report (2)	Fortes 3'; Reziq (yellow card) 77'	Stadium: Temerloh Mini Stadium; Attendance: 2,973; Referee: Tuan Mohd Yaasin

10 August 2024 8	Selangor	2–0	Kelantan Darul Naim	Petaling Jaya
17:30 UTC+08:00	Eshmurodov (yellow card) 38'; Fernández 66', 86' (pen.); Reziq (yellow card) 78'	Report (1); Report (2)	Syahir (yellow card) 26'; Adam (yellow card) 39'; Kharoub (yellow card) 77'; Zuasyraf (yellow card) 79'	Stadium: MBPJ Stadium; Attendance: 7,465; Referee: Munir Izam

13 August 2024 9	Sabah	1–2	Selangor	Kota Kinabalu
20:15 UTC+08:00	Safuwan 27' (o.g.)	Report (1); Report (2)	Fernández (yellow card) 29' (goal) 32'; Harith 86'	Stadium: Likas Stadium; Attendance: 4,652; Referee: Zamzaidi Katimin

13 September 2024 10	Selangor	4–0	Kuching City	Petaling Jaya
21:00 UTC+08:00	Fernández 11'; Cheng (yellow card) 44'; Olwan 67'; Eshmurodov 75'; Fortes 80'	Report (1); Report (2)	Danial Amier (yellow card) 35'	Stadium: MBPJ Stadium; Attendance: 5,422; Referee: Amirul Izwan Yaacob

28 September 2024 (Note: The match was originally scheduled for 21 September 2024.) 11	Terengganu	0–1	Selangor	Kuala Nerus
21:00 UTC+08:00	Alif (yellow card) 44'	Report (1); Report (2)	Fernández 1'; Harith (yellow card) 27'; Sharul (yellow card) 48'; Syahir (yellow card) 79'; Laine (yellow card) 90+6'	Stadium: Sultan Mizan Zainal Abidin Stadium; Attendance: 4,419; Referee: Ahmad Zuhadi Dzulkifli
Note: The match was rescheduled by the MFL due to Selangor's participation in the AFC Champions League Two.

19 October 2024 12	PDRM	1–1	Selangor	Selayang
21:00 UTC+08:00	Afendy (yellow card) 36'; Amir (yellow card) 55'; Timothy 90+2'	Report (1); Report (2)	Fortes 16'; Laine (yellow card) 37'; Harith (yellow card) 86'	Stadium: Selayang Stadium; Attendance: 4,971; Referee: Fitri Maskon

27 October 2024 13	Selangor	0–3	Johor Darul Ta'zim	Petaling Jaya
20:15 UTC+08:00	Laine (yellow card) 79'	Report (1); Report (2)	Park (yellow card) 25'; Undabarrena (yellow card) 26'; Morales 30'; Bérgson 42', 54' (pen.); Muñiz (yellow card) 50'	Stadium: MBPJ Stadium; Attendance: 10,215; Referee: Nazmi Nasaruddin

2 November 2024 14	Kedah Darul Aman	0–1	Selangor	Alor Setar
21:00 UTC+08:00	Ariff (yellow card) 22'; Fadzrul (yellow card) 85'	Report (1); Report (2)	Safuwan (yellow card) 33'; Harith (yellow card) 45+2'; Izwan 47'	Stadium: Darulaman Stadium; Attendance: 6,090; Referee: Hasrol Amir

9 December 2024 15	Negeri Sembilan	0–4	Selangor	Paroi
20:30 UTC+08:00	Rashid (red card) 43'; Zainal (yellow card) 51'	Report (1); Report (2)	Haiqal 15'; Fortes 39'; Cheng 48'; Orozco 61'	Stadium: Tuanku Abdul Rahman Stadium; Attendance: 1,341; Referee: Tuan Mohd Yaasin

17 December 2024 16	Perak	1–2	Selangor	Seri Manjung
20:30 UTC+08:00	Aiman (yellow card) 84'; Zack 89'	Report (1); Report (2)	Fortes 41', 71'; Laine (yellow card) 54'; Safuwan (yellow card) 60'	Stadium: Manjung Municipal Council Stadium; Attendance: 2,587; Referee: Nazmi Nasaruddin

12 January 2025 17	Selangor	1–0	Kuala Lumpur City	Petaling Jaya
17:15 UTC+08:00	Laine (yellow card) 20'; Fortes 63'	Report (1); Report (2)	Rudović (yellow card) 4'; Giannelli (yellow card) 16'; Shaqirin (yellow card) 90+6'	Stadium: MBPJ Stadium; Attendance: 5,690; Referee: Tuan Mohd Yaasin

25 January 2025 18	Penang	1–1	Selangor	George Town
20:15 UTC+08:00	Syamer (yellow card) 48'; Vitor 90+11' (pen.)	Report (1); Report (2)	Fernández 10' (yellow card) 88'; Fortes (yellow card) 50'; Olwan (yellow card) 72'; Jambor (yellow card) 81'	Stadium: City Stadium; Attendance: 2,198; Referee: Suhaizi Shukri

8 February 2025 19	Selangor	2–0	Sri Pahang	Petaling Jaya
20:15 UTC+08:00	Olwan 14'; Fernández 39'; Harith (yellow card) 52'; Agyarkwa (yellow card) 65'	Report (1); Report (2)	Hidalgo (yellow card) 21'; Adam (yellow card) 48'; Saravanan (yellow card) 90+3'	Stadium: MBPJ Stadium; Attendance: 3,023; Referee: Zamzaidi Katimin

27 February 2025 20	Selangor	0–0	Sabah	Petaling Jaya
21:00 UTC+08:00	Sharul (yellow card) 13'; Fernández (yellow card) 45'; Safuwan (yellow card) 75'	Report (1); Report (2)	Saddil (yellow card) 43'; Dinesh (yellow card) 76'	Stadium: MBPJ Stadium; Attendance: 2,525; Referee: Suhaizi Shukri

8 March 2025 (Note: The match was originally scheduled for 28 March 2025.) 21	Kelantan Darul Naim	0–7	Selangor	Petaling Jaya
22:00 UTC+08:00	Syahir (yellow card) 80'; Umeir (yellow card) 84'	Report (1); Report (2)	Faisal 13', 45+2', 66'; Cheng 31'; Harith 54', 56'; Izwan 73'	Stadium: MBPJ Stadium; Attendance: 1,293; Referee: Kamil Zakaria
Note: Kelantan Darul Naim will play their home matches at MBPJ Stadium, Petaling Jaya, instead of their regular stadium, Sultan Muhammad IV Stadium, Kota Bharu.

16 March 2025 22	Kuching City	2–1	Selangor	Kuching
21:15 UTC+08:00	Shahril (yellow card) 23'; Ramadhan 26'; Raymond 85'	Report (1); Report (2)	Sharul (yellow card) 44'; Mukhairi 51'; Aliff (yellow card) 72'; Laine (yellow card) 75'	Stadium: Sarawak State Stadium; Attendance: 5,673; Referee: Nazmi Nasaruddin

5 April 2025 23	Selangor	1–0	Terengganu	Petaling Jaya
20:15 UTC+08:00	Zikri (yellow card) 28'; Jambor (yellow card) 52'; Fortes 88'	Report (1); Report (2)		Stadium: MBPJ Stadium; Attendance: 2,453; Referee: Khairulsyahmi Ahmad Khalidi

19 April 2025 24	Selangor	2–0	PDRM	Petaling Jaya
20:15 UTC+08:00	Zikri (yellow card) 42'; Faisal (yellow card) 45'; Fortes 49'; Izwan (yellow card) 59'; Cheng (yellow card) 69'; Safuwan (yellow card) 83'; Orozco 90+2'	Report (1); Report (2)	Obilor (yellow card) 55'	Stadium: MBPJ Stadium; Attendance: 2,284; Referee: Usaid Jamal

==== Results overview ====
Win Draw Loss Cancelled

Team	Home score	Away score	Double
Johor Darul Ta'zim	0–3	0–3 (Note: Walkover.)	0–6
Kedah Darul Aman	1–0	1–0	2–0
Kelantan Darul Naim	2–0	7–0	9–0
Kuching City	4–0	1–2	5–2
Kuala Lumpur City	1–0	0–1	1–1
Negeri Sembilan	4–0	4–0	8–0
Penang	4–1	1–1	5–2
Perak	2–1	2–1	4–2
PDRM	2–0	1–1	3–1
Sabah	0–0	2–1	2–1
Sri Pahang	2–0	1–1	3–1
Terengganu	1–0	1–0	2–0

=== FA Cup ===
As a Super League side, Selangor entered the competition in the round of 16. The draw was made on 16 May 2024 and were drawn at home to Negeri Sembilan.

==== Round of 16 ====
15 June 2024 Round of 16	Selangor	4–0	Negeri Sembilan	Petaling Jaya
17:30 UTC+08:00	Orozco 6', 14'; Harith (yellow card) 18'; Fortes 44', 67'	Report (1); Report (2)	Faye (yellow card) 41'	Stadium: MBPJ Stadium; Attendance: 9,861; Referee: Nafeez Abd Wahab

==== Quarter-finals ====
29 June 2024 First leg	Kuching City	2–1	Selangor	Kuching
20:15 UTC+08:00	Okwuosa (yellow card) 18' (goal) 45+6'; Shamie (yellow card) 20'; Zahrul (yellow card) 48'; Mintah 64'	Report (1); Report (2)	Ruventhiran (yellow card) 14'; Fernández (yellow card) 18' (goal) 31'	Stadium: Sarawak State Stadium; Attendance: 3,338; Referee: Fitri Maskon

6 July 2024 Second leg	Selangor	3–2 (a.e.t.) (4–4 agg.) (5–3 p)	Kuching City	Petaling Jaya
21:00 UTC+08:00	Zikri 27'; Fortes 38', 90+7'; Sharul (yellow card) 83'; Orozco (red card) 90+5'; Reziq (red card) 103'	Report (1); Report (2)	Shamie 15'; Raymond (yellow card) 19'; Filemon (yellow card) 45+1'; Diego (yellow card) 90+5'; Alif Hassan 90+8' (yellow card) 105+1'	Stadium: MBPJ Stadium; Attendance: 10,049; Referee: Suhaizi Shukri
	Penalties
	Safuwan (penalty scored); Aliff Haiqal (penalty scored); Syahir (penalty scored); Aliff Izwan (penalty scored); Harith (penalty scored)		(penalty scored) Arif; (penalty scored) Alif Hassan; (penalty scored) Danial Amier; (penalty missed) Tanigawa
Note: The match was temporarily suspended in the 66th minute, and delay for 20 minutes due to a floodlight failure.

==== Semi-finals ====
19 July 2024 First leg	Terengganu	3–2	Selangor	Kuala Nerus
21:00 UTC+08:00	Safawi 30'; Tukhtasinov 35'; Akinade 70'	Report (1); Report (2)	Laine (yellow card) 6'; Fortes 39'; Noor 48'; Safuwan (yellow card) 57'; Eshmurodov (yellow card) 74'	Stadium: Sultan Mizan Zainal Abidin Stadium; Attendance: 31,689; Referee: Hasrol Amir

3 August 2024 Second leg	Selangor	4–1 (6–4 agg.)	Terengganu	Petaling Jaya
21:00 UTC+08:00	Safuwan 3', 6', 54'; Fortes (yellow card) 71'; Somerville (yellow card) 90+2'; Reziq 90+3'	Report (1); Report (2)	Akinade 22'; Steenvoorden (yellow card) 58'; Akram (yellow card) 80'	Stadium: MBPJ Stadium; Attendance: 10,569; Referee: Usaid Jamal

==== Final ====
24 August 2024 Final	Johor Darul Ta'zim	6–1	Selangor	Bukit Jalil, Kuala Lumpur
21:00 UTC+08:00	Muñiz 26', 67', 90'; Heberty (yellow card) 28' (goal) 76'; Lowry (yellow card) 40'; Arif Aiman 42'; Bérgson 62'	Report (1); Report (2)	Fazly (yellow card) 3'; Noor (yellow card) 40'; Fortes 59'; Fernández (yellow card) 66'; Safuwan (yellow card) 88'	Stadium: Bukit Jalil National Stadium; Attendance: 80,350; Referee: Nazmi Nasaruddin

=== Malaysia Cup ===
==== Knockout stage ====
As a Super League side, Selangor entered the competition in the round of 16.

==== Round of 16 ====
23 November 2024 First leg	Sri Pahang	1–1	Selangor	Temerloh
20:30 UTC+08:00	Selvaraj 27'; Agüero (yellow card) 44'; Baqiuddin (yellow card) 90+4'	Report (1); Report (2)	Jambor 83'; Fortes (yellow card) 87'	Stadium: Temerloh Mini Stadium; Attendance: 2,627; Referee: Hasrol Amir

1 December 2024 Second leg	Selangor	1–2 (2–3 agg.)	Sri Pahang	Petaling Jaya
20:30 UTC+08:00	Harith (yellow card) 24'; Safuwan 77'	Report (1); Report (2)	Hidalgo 25' (pen.) (yellow card) 87'; Agüero (yellow card) 57' (goal) 85' (pen.)	Stadium: MBPJ Stadium; Attendance: 7,065; Referee: Kamil Zakaria

=== MFL Challenge Cup ===
Following elimination in the Malaysia Cup round of 16, Selangor entered or been transferred to the MFL competition. The first match begin in the quarter-finals.

==== Quarter-finals ====
12 December 2024 First leg	Kelantan Darul Naim	1–5	Selangor	Petaling Jaya
21:00 UTC+08:00	Umeir (yellow card) 21'; Muhammad (yellow card) 39'; Arip 70'	Report (1); Report (2)	Fernández 2', 74'; Mukhairi 37', 48'; Fortes (yellow card) 53'; Cheng 80'	Stadium: MBPJ Stadium; Attendance: 842; Referee: Hanis Maani

22 December 2024 Second leg	Selangor	3–0 (8–1 agg.)	Kelantan Darul Naim	Petaling Jaya
21:00 UTC+08:00	Sharul 10'; Fernández 45+2'; Fortes (yellow card) 52'; Danial 61'; Mukhairi (yellow card) 66'	Report (1); Report (2)	Asraff (yellow card) 82'	Stadium: MBPJ Stadium; Attendance: 1,397; Referee: Faizudin Ismail

==== Semi-finals ====
19 January 2025 First leg	Penang	0–1	Selangor	George Town
20:30 UTC+08:00	Ikmalrizal (yellow card) 75'	Report (1); Report (2)	Cheng (yellow card) 21'; Mukhairi (yellow card) 32'; Vitor 35' (o.g.); Fernández (yellow card) 44'; Fazly (yellow card) 81'	Stadium: City Stadium; Attendance: 2,186; Referee: Nafeez Abd Wahab

2 February 2025 Second leg	Selangor	1–0 (2–0 agg.)	Penang	Petaling Jaya
21:00 UTC+08:00	Safuwan (yellow card) 45+3'; Agyarkwa (yellow card) 49'; Fortes 66'; Kalamullah (yellow card) 89'	Report (1); Report (2)	Neto (yellow card) 26'; Amer (yellow card) 53'; Adib (yellow card) 63'; Khairul Akmal (yellow card) 68'; Vitor (yellow card) 82'	Stadium: MBPJ Stadium; Attendance: 3,310; Referee: Tuan Mohd Yaasin

==== Final ====
15 February 2025 First leg	Selangor	3–0; Awarded (Note: Disciplinary Committee of the Football Association of Malaysia (FAM) awarded Selangor a 3–0 win as a result of PDRM fielding the ineligible player Safiee Ahmad, after Selangor had defeated PDRM by 3–2. Safiee Ahmad failed to serve an automatic one match suspension for receiving two yellow cards earlier in the quarter-finals first leg match against Melaka and the semi-finals second leg match against Kedah Darul Aman.)	PDRM	Petaling Jaya
21:00 UTC+08:00	Fortes 4', 18'; Safuwan (red card) 10'; Olwan 51'; Fazly (yellow card) 71'	Report (1); Report (2)	Shahrel 28'; Badrul 39'; Min Oo (yellow card) 66'; Safiee (yellow card) 71'; Suzuki (yellow card) 79'	Stadium: MBPJ Stadium; Attendance: 3,768; Referee: Zamzaidi Katimin

22 February 2025 Second leg	PDRM	0–4 (0–7 agg.)	Selangor	Petaling Jaya
21:00 UTC+08:00	Badrul (yellow card) 13'; Eizrul (red card) 22'	Report (1); Report (2)	Olwan 4'; Orozco 10', 81'; Fernández 30'; Fortes (yellow card) 55'	Stadium: MBPJ Stadium; Attendance: 2,232; Referee: Nazmi Nasaruddin
Note: PDRM played their home matches at MBPJ Stadium, Petaling Jaya, instead of their regular home stadium Selayang Municipal Council Stadium, Selayang.

=== AFC Champions League Two ===
==== Group stage ====
The 2024–25 AFC Champions League Two group stage draw took place in InterContinental Kuala Lumpur in Kuala Lumpur, Malaysia on 16 August 2024. The first group matches were played on 19 September 2024.

Win Draw Loss Fixtures

Pos	Team	Pld	W	D	L	GF	GA	GD	Pts	Qualification	JBH	MTU	SEL	DHC
1	(South Korea) Jeonbuk Hyundai Motors	6	4	0	2	16	4	+12	12	Advance to round of 16	—	4–1	1–0	4–0
2	(Thailand) Muangthong United	6	3	2	1	16	10	+6	11	Advance to round of 16	1–0	—	1–1	2–2
3	(Malaysia) Selangor	6	3	1	2	9	5	+4	10		2–1	1–2	—	1–0
4	(Philippines) DH Cebu	6	0	1	5	4	26	−22	1		0–6	2–9	0–4	—

Source: AFC
Rules for classification: Tiebreakers

19 September 2024 1	Muangthong United (Thailand)	1–1	(Malaysia) Selangor	Bangkok, Thailand
17.00 UTC+7	Purachet 54'; Roback (yellow card) 75'	Report (1); Report (2)	Safuwan (yellow card) 39'; Fernández 47'; Harith (yellow card) 84'	Stadium: Rajamangala Stadium; Attendance: 1,366; Referee: Bijan Heidari (Iran)

3 October 2024 2	Selangor (Malaysia)	1–0	(Philippines) DH Cebu	Petaling Jaya
20:00 UTC+08:00	Orozco 10'	Report (1); Report (2)	Togashi (yellow card) 83'	Stadium: MBPJ Stadium; Attendance: 8,158; Referee: Nasrullo Kabirov (Tajikistan)

23 October 2024 3	Selangor (Malaysia)	2–1	(South Korea) Jeonbuk Hyundai Motors	Petaling Jaya
20:00 UTC+08:00	Harith 30'; Olwan 33'; Orozco (yellow card) 90+7' (yellow-red card) 90+8'	Report (1); Report (2)	Chang-hoon 40'	Stadium: MBPJ Stadium; Attendance: 7,257; Referee: Mooud Bonyadifard (Iran)

7 November 2024 4	Jeonbuk Hyundai Motors (South Korea)	1–0	(Malaysia) Selangor	Jeonju, South Korea
19:00 KST UTC+9	Tiago 22'	Report (1); Report (2)		Stadium: Jeonju World Cup Stadium; Attendance: 3,231; Referee: Liu Kwok Man (Hong Kong)

28 November 2024 5	Selangor (Malaysia)	1–2	(Thailand) Muangthong United	Petaling Jaya
20:00 UTC+08:00	Cheng 5'; Jambor (yellow card) 45'	Report (1); Report (2)	Strauß (yellow card) 45+1'; Brown 53'; Sorawit (yellow card) 57'; Poramet 76'	Stadium: MBPJ Stadium; Attendance: 7,241; Referee: Ahmad Yaacob (Jordan)

5 December 2024 6	DH Cebu (Philippines)	0–4	(Malaysia) Selangor	Manila, Philippines
18:00 UTC+8	Togashi (yellow card) 73'	Report (1); Report (2)	Orozco 44', 48'; Laine 57'; Fortes 79'; Zikri (yellow card) 87'	Stadium: Rizal Memorial Stadium; Attendance: 326; Referee: Sultan Mohamed Saleh Yousif Al Hammadi (United Arab Emirates)

== Statistics ==
=== Squad statistics ===
As of 19 April 2025

Appearances (Apps.) numbers are for appearances in competitive games only including sub appearances.
Red card numbers denote: Numbers in parentheses represent red cards overturned for wrongful dismissal.

No.	Nat.	Player	Pos.	Super League				FA Cup				Malaysia Cup				Challenge Cup				Champions League Two				Total			
No.	Nat.	Player	Pos.	Apps	Goal	Yellow card	Red card	Apps	Goal	Yellow card	Red card	Apps	Goal	Yellow card	Red card	Apps	Goal	Yellow card	Red card	Apps	Goal	Yellow card	Red card	Apps	Goal	Yellow card	Red card
1	(Malaysia)	Khairulazhan	GK	2																				2			
2	(Malaysia)	Quentin Cheng	DF	21	3	2		6				2				6	1	1		6	1			41	5	3	
3	(Jordan)	Mohammad Abualnadi	DF	6								1				3				5				15			
6	(Malaysia)	Nooa Laine	MF	20		6		6		1		2				6				6	1			40	1	7	
7	(Malaysia)	Faisal Halim	FW	13	3	1						2				5				4				24	3	1	
8	(Jordan)	Noor Al-Rawabdeh	MF	9	1			5	1	1										2				16	2	1	
9	(Chile)	Ronnie Fernández	FW	20	10	3		6	1	2		1				6	4	1		6	1			39	16	6	
10	(Malaysia)	Mukhairi Ajmal	MF	17	2			2				2				5	2	2		3				29	4	2	
11	(Cape Verde)	Alvin Fortes	FW	22	10	1		6	6	1		2		1		5	3	3		5	1			40	20	6	
14	(Malaysia)	Zikri Khalili	DF	18		3		5	1			2				4				6		1		35	1	4	
16	(Venezuela)	Yohandry Orozco	MF	21	4			5	2		1	2				4	2			5	3		1	37	11		2
17	(Malaysia)	Danial Asri	FW	4								2				4	1			1				11	1		
18	(Malaysia)	Khuzaimi Piee	DF	4												2								6			
19	(Malaysia)	V. Ruventhiran	DF	3				1		1														4		1	
20	(Malaysia)	Azim Al-Amin	GK	4				1				2				1				5				13			
21	(Singapore)	Safuwan Baharudin	DF	19		5		6	3	2		2	1			3		1	1	3		1		33	4	9	1
22	(Malaysia)	Fazly Mazlan	DF	12		1		4		1						4		2		1				21		4	
23	(Malaysia)	Samuel Somerville	GK	7				6		1														13		1	
24	(Ghana)	Alex Agyarkwa	MF	9		1	1	6								4		1						19		2	1
25	(Croatia)	Nikola Jambor	MF	11		2						2	1			4				4		1		21	1	3	
28	(Malaysia)	Muhammad Khalil†	MF					1																1			
31	(Malaysia)	Harry Danish	FW													1								1			
33	(Malaysia)	Kalamullah Al-Hafiz	GK	10												5		1		1				16		1	
43	(Malaysia)	Syahir Bashah	MF	6		1		4								1				1				12		1	
44	(Malaysia)	Sharul Nazeem	DF	19		4		6		1						5	1			3				33	1	5	
55	(Malaysia)	Harith Haiqal	DF	19	3	6		5		1		2		1		3				6	1	1		35	4	9	
76	(Malaysia)	Aliff Izwan	MF	8	2	1		2				1				5				3				19	2	1	
77	(Malaysia)	Aliff Haiqal	MF	18	2	2		5				2				5				5				35	2	2	
90	(Jordan)	Ali Olwan	FW	10	2	1						1				2	2			6	1			19	5	1	
92	(Uzbekistan)	Umar Eshmurodov†	DF	12	1	1		1		1		1				1				5				20	1	2	
99	(Jordan)	Reziq Bani Hani†	FW	7	1	2		3	1		1													10	2	2	1
Own goals					0				0				0				1				0				1		
Totals					44	43	1		15	13	2		2	2	0		17	12	1		9	4	1		87	74	5

† Player left the club during the season.

=== Goalscorers ===
As of match played 19 April 2025

Includes all competitive matches. The list is sorted alphabetically by surname when total goals are equal.

Rank	Pos.	No.	Player	Super League	FA Cup	Malaysia Cup	Challenge Cup	Champions League Two	Total
1	FW	11	(Cape Verde) Alvin Fortes	10	6	0	3	1	20
2	FW	9	(Chile) Ronnie Fernández	10	1	0	4	1	16
3	MF	16	(Venezuela) Yohandry Orozco	4	2	0	2	3	11
4	DF	2	(Malaysia) Quentin Cheng	3	0	0	1	1	5
4	FW	90	(Jordan) Ali Olwan	2	0	0	2	1	5
6	MF	10	(Malaysia) Mukhairi Ajmal	2	0	0	2	0	4
6	DF	21	(Singapore) Safuwan Baharudin	0	3	1	0	0	4
6	DF	55	(Malaysia) Harith Haiqal	3	0	0	0	1	4
9	FW	7	(Malaysia) Faisal Halim	3	0	0	0	0	3
10	MF	8	(Jordan) Noor Al-Rawabdeh	1	1	0	0	0	2
10	MF	76	(Malaysia) Aliff Izwan	2	0	0	0	0	2
10	MF	77	(Malaysia) Aliff Haiqal	2	0	0	0	0	2
10	FW	99	(Jordan) Reziq Bani Hani†	1	1	0	0	0	2
14	MF	6	(Malaysia) Nooa Laine	0	0	0	0	1	1
14	DF	14	(Malaysia) Zikri Khalili	0	1	0	0	0	1
14	FW	17	(Malaysia) Danial Asri	0	0	0	1	0	1
14	MF	25	(Croatia) Nikola Jambor	0	0	1	0	0	1
14	DF	44	(Malaysia) Sharul Nazeem	0	0	0	1	0	1
14	DF	92	(Uzbekistan) Umar Eshmurodov†	1	0	0	0	0	1
Own goals				0	0	0	1	0	1
Totals				44	15	2	17	9	87

† Player left the club during the season.

=== Top assists ===
Rnk	Pos	No.	Player	Super League	FA Cup	Malaysia Cup	Challenge Cup	Champions League Two	Total
1	MF	16	(Venezuela) Yohandry Orozco	4	4	0	1	2	11
2	DF	2	(Malaysia) Quentin Cheng	5	0	0	4	0	9
3	MF	6	(Malaysia) Nooa Laine	2	2	0	1	1	6
3	FW	9	(Chile) Ronnie Fernández	1	0	0	4	1	6
3	FW	11	(Cape Verde) Alvin Fortes	1	1	1	2	1	6
6	MF	10	(Malaysia) Mukhairi Ajmal	3	1	0	1	0	5
7	DF	21	(Singapore) Safuwan Baharudin	1	1	1	0	0	3
8	FW	7	(Malaysia) Faisal Halim	1	0	0	1	0	2
8	MF	8	(Jordan) Noor Al-Rawabdeh	2	0	0	0	0	2
8	MF	24	(Ghana) Alex Agyarkwa	1	1	0	0	0	2
8	MF	77	(Malaysia) Aliff Haiqal	2	0	0	0	0	2
12	DF	14	(Malaysia) Zikri Khalili	1	0	0	0	0	1
12	FW	17	(Malaysia) Danial Asri	1	0	0	0	0	1
12	MF	25	(Croatia) Nikola Jambor	1	0	0	0	0	1
12	DF	44	(Malaysia) Sharul Nazeem	1	0	0	0	0	1
12	FW	90	(Jordan) Ali Olwan	1	0	0	0	0	1
12	DF	92	(Uzbekistan) Umar Eshmurodov†	0	0	0	0	1	1
12	FW	99	(Jordan) Reziq Bani Hani†	1	0	0	0	0	1
TOTALS				29	10	2	14	6	61

† Player left the club during the season.

=== Clean sheets ===
Rnk	No.	Player	Super League	FA Cup	Malaysia Cup	Challenge Cup	Champions League Two	Total
1	33	(Malaysia) Kalamullah Al-Hafiz	6	0	0	4	1	11
2	23	(Malaysia) Samuel Somerville	4	1	0	0	0	5
3	20	(Malaysia) Azim Al-Amin	3	0	0	0	1	4
TOTALS			13	1	0	4	2	20

=== Disciplinary record ===
As of match played 19 April 2025

Includes all competitive matches. The list is sorted alphabetically by surname when total cards are equal.

Rank	No.	Pos.	Player	Super League			FA Cup			Malaysia Cup			Challenge Cup			Champions League Two			Total		
Rank	No.	Pos.	Player	Yellow card	(yellow card) (yellow-red card)	Red card	Yellow card	(yellow card) (yellow-red card)	Red card	Yellow card	(yellow card) (yellow-red card)	Red card	Yellow card	(yellow card) (yellow-red card)	Red card	Yellow card	(yellow card) (yellow-red card)	Red card	Yellow card	(yellow card) (yellow-red card)	Red card
1	21	DF	(Singapore) Safuwan Baharudin	5	-	-	2	-	-	-	-	-	1	-	1	1	-	-	9	-	1
1	55	DF	(Malaysia) Harith Haiqal	6	-	-	1	-	-	1	-	-	-	-	-	1	-	-	9	-	-
3	6	MF	(Malaysia) Nooa Laine	6	-	-	1	-	-	-	-	-	-	-	-	-	-	-	7	-	-
4	9	FW	(Chile) Ronnie Fernández	3	-	-	2	-	-	-	-	-	1	-	-	-	-	-	6	-	-
4	11	FW	(Cape Verde) Alvin Fortes	1	-	-	1	-	-	1	-	-	3	-	-	-	-	-	6	-	-
6	44	DF	(Malaysia) Sharul Nazeem	4	-	-	1	-	-	-	-	-	-	-	-	-	-	-	5	-	-
7	14	DF	(Malaysia) Zikri Khalili	3	-	-	-	-	-	-	-	-	-	-	-	1	-	-	4	-	-
7	22	DF	(Malaysia) Fazly Mazlan	1	-	-	1	-	-	-	-	-	2	-	-	-	-	-	4	-	-
9	2	DF	(Malaysia) Quentin Cheng	2	-	-	-	-	-	-	-	-	1	-	-	-	-	-	3	-	-
9	25	MF	(Croatia) Nikola Jambor	2	-	-	-	-	-	-	-	-	-	-	-	1	-	-	3	-	-
11	10	MF	(Malaysia) Mukhairi Ajmal	-	-	-	-	-	-	-	-	-	2	-	-	-	-	-	2	-	-
11	24	MF	(Ghana) Alex Agyarkwa	1	-	1	-	-	-	-	-	-	1	-	-	-	-	-	2	-	1
11	77	MF	(Malaysia) Aliff Haiqal	2	-	-	-	-	-	-	-	-	-	-	-	-	-	-	2	-	-
11	92	DF	(Uzbekistan) Umar Eshmurodov†	1	-	-	1	-	-	-	-	-	-	-	-	-	-	-	2	-	-
11	99	FW	(Jordan) Reziq Bani Hani†	2	-	-	-	-	1	-	-	-	-	-	-	-	-	-	2	-	1
16	16	MF	(Venezuela) Yohandry Orozco	-	-	-	-	-	1	-	-	-	-	-	-	-	1	-	-	1	1
16	7	FW	(Malaysia) Faisal Halim	1	-	-	-	-	-	-	-	-	-	-	-	-	-	-	1	-	-
16	8	MF	(Jordan) Noor Al-Rawabdeh	-	-	-	1	-	-	-	-	-	-	-	-	-	-	-	1	-	-
16	19	DF	(Malaysia) V. Ruventhiran	-	-	-	1	-	-	-	-	-	-	-	-	-	-	-	1	-	-
16	23	GK	(Malaysia) Samuel Somerville	-	-	-	1	-	-	-	-	-	-	-	-	-	-	-	1	-	-
16	33	GK	(Malaysia) Kalamullah Al-Hafiz	-	-	-	-	-	-	-	-	-	1	-	-	-	-	-	1	-	-
16	43	MF	(Malaysia) Syahir Bashah	1	-	-	-	-	-	-	-	-	-	-	-	-	-	-	1	-	-
16	76	MF	(Malaysia) Aliff Izwan	1	-	-	-	-	-	-	-	-	-	-	-	-	-	-	1	-	-
16	90	FW	(Jordan) Ali Olwan	1	-	-	-	-	-	-	-	-	-	-	-	-	-	-	1	-	-
Total				43	0	1	13	0	2	2	0	0	12	0	1	4	1	0	74	1	4

† Player left the club during the season.

=== Hat-tricks ===
Player	Against	Result	Date	Competition	Ref
(Singapore) Safuwan Baharudin	Terengganu (H)	4–1	3 August 2024	FA Cup	
(Malaysia) Faisal Halim	Kelantan Darul Naim (A)	7–0	8 March 2025	Super League	

^{4} – Player scored four goals.
