= 2024 Malaysia FA Cup final =

Association football match in Malaysia

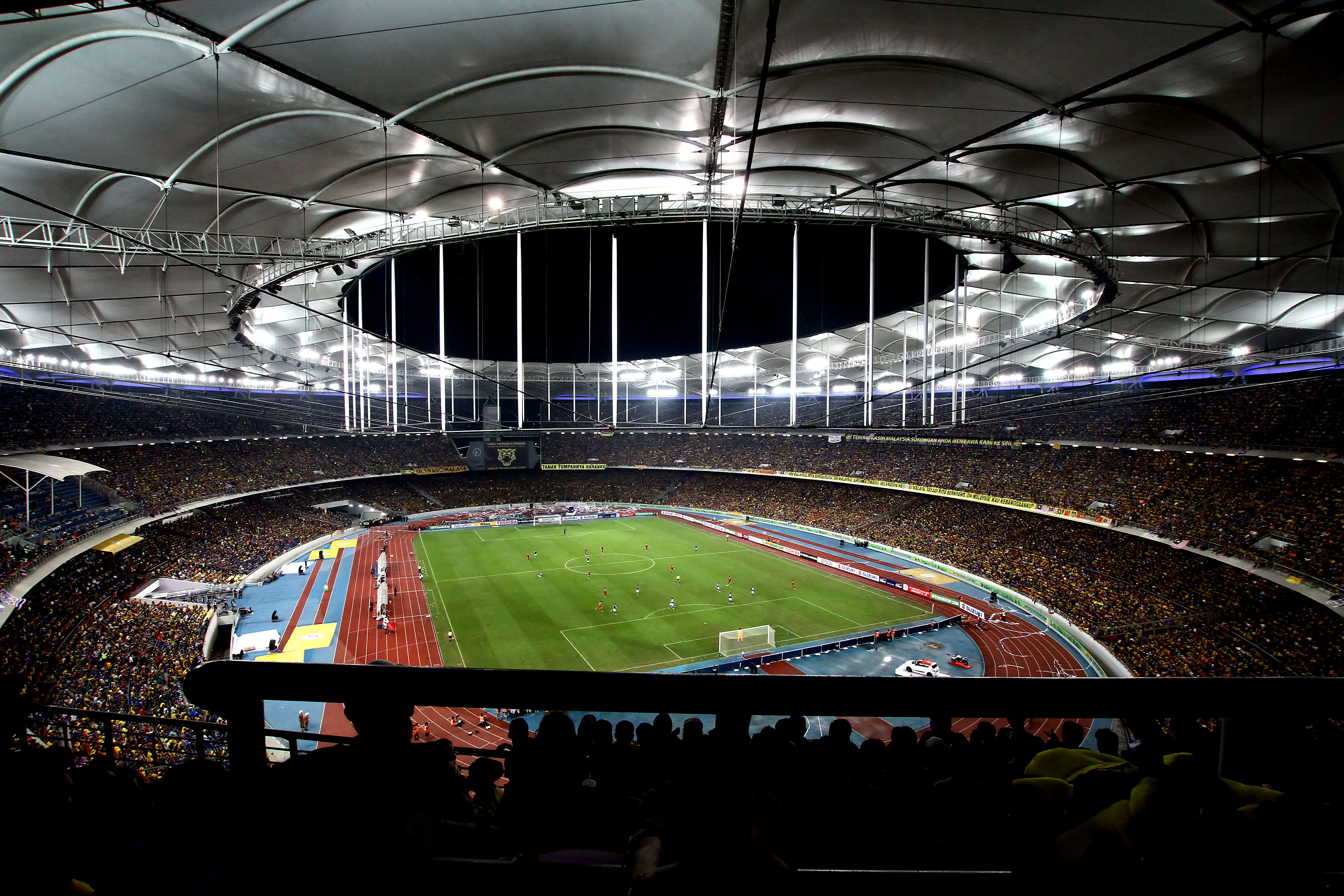
- The match took place at Bukit Jalil National Stadium.
- Event: 2024–25 Malaysia FA Cup
Johor Darul Ta'zim	Selangor
6	1
- Date: 24 August 2024
- Venue: Bukit Jalil National Stadium, Bukit Jalil, Kuala Lumpur
- Man of the Match: Juan Muñiz (Johor Darul Ta'zim)
- Referee: Nazmi Nasaruddin
- Attendance: 80,350
- Weather: Good; 27 °C (81 °F)

The 2024 Malaysia FA Cup final was an association football match played between Johor Darul Ta'zim and Selangor at Bukit Jalil National Stadium, Bukit Jalil, Kuala Lumpur on 24 August 2024. It was the final match of the 2024 Malaysia FA Cup, the 35th season of the football knockout competition.

Nazmi Nasaruddin was the referee for the match played in front of 80,350 spectators. Johor Darul Ta'zim (JDT) dominated the stages of the final. The match ended 6–1 to JDT: it was only the first time that a team had scored six goals in an FA Cup final, and the margin of victory is the joint-largest in an FA Cup final history.

As winners, Johor Darul Ta'zim qualified for the group stage of the 2025–26 AFC Champions League Two.

== Background ==
The Malaysian Football League (MFL) announced the Malaysian League competition schedule, involving the FA Cup competition. The final match schedules expected to be held on 24 August 2024.

Johor Darul Ta'zim were playing a fifth FA Cup final. Of these, they had won three, and most recently the previous season's final against Kuala Lumpur City. Their most recent defeat in the final was in 2013, losing 1–0 to Kelantan. Selangor were participating in a record 9th FA Cup Final, having previously won a record five, most recently in 2009 against Kelantan. Their latest appearance was in 2018 final, when they were defeated to Pahang.

== Route to the final ==
Note: In all results below, the score of the finalist is given first (H: home; A: away).

Johor Darul Ta'zim				Round	Selangor			
Opponent	Agg.	1st leg	2nd leg	Knockout phase	Opponent	Agg.	1st leg	2nd leg
Kelantan Darul Naim	4–0 (H)			Round of 16 (Note: The round of 16 played in a single-leg format.)	Negeri Sembilan	4–0 (H)		
Malaysian University	13–0	5–0 (A)	8–0 (H)	Quarter-finals	Kuching City	4–4 (5–3 p)	1–2 (A)	3–2 (a.e.t.) (H)
Kedah Darul Aman	5–1	2–1 (A)	3–0 (H)	Semi-finals	Terengganu	6–4	2–3 (A)	4–1 (H)

=== Johor Darul Ta'zim ===
Johor Darul Ta'zim (JDT), a Super League club, entered the FA Cup in the single-leg round of 16. They were drawn at home against Super League side Kelantan Darul Naim. At the Sultan Ibrahim Stadium, JDT won 4–0 with one goal each from Fernando Forestieri, Romel Morales, Francisco Geraldes and Arif Aiman. In the two-legged next round, they faced A1-Semi Pro League side Malaysian University. JDT earned a 5–0 victory in the first leg at away, with goals from Corbin-Ong, Shahrul Saad, Romel Morales and two from Francisco Geraldes. In the second leg, they earned the biggest win of the season, winning 8–0 at Sultan Ibrahim Stadium to advance to the semi-final and record a 13–0 aggregate score.

The semi-final pitted JDT against Super League side Kedah Darul Aman, with the first leg at Darulaman Stadium. Óscar Arribas put JDT one goal ahead in the 24th minute, before the home side levelled the tie in the 87th minute, scored by Habib Haroon. However, Romel Morales scored in the injury time to put the visitors back ahead 2–1 and the results remained until the match ended. The second leg at Sultan Ibrahim Stadium saw JDT start better of the two sides and each goal from Feroz Baharudin, Bérgson and Juan Muñiz meant they won 3–0 on the night, 5–1 on aggregate score to progress to the final.

=== Selangor ===
Selangor, a Super League club, started their FA Cup campaign in the single-leg round of 16, where they had been drawn home against Negeri Sembilan. At the MBPJ Stadium, Yohandry Orozco and Alvin Fortes scored twice to give Selangor a 4–0 victory. In the two-legged quarter-finals, they faced another Super League side Kuching City. In the first leg at Sarawak State Stadium, Selangor lost 2–1; both goals came in the first half for both teams, first from Ronnie Fernández and James Okwuosa, before Jordan Mintah sealed a win for the home side. In the return leg, Shamie Iszuan put Kuching's lead in the 15th minute, before Zikri Khalili and Alvin Fortes put Selangor 2–1 ahead just before half-time. Fortes scored a late goal in deep into added time, but Alif Hassan scored a minute later to help visitor equalise the aggregate, resulting in extra time. The match was goalless after extra time, sending the game to a penalty shoot-out, which Selangor won 5–3.

Selangor played Terengganu in the semi-final, with the first leg at Sultan Mizan Zainal Abidin Stadium. Two goals in the first 35 minutes courtesy of Safawi Rasid and Nurillo Tukhtasinov gave Terengganu an early 2–0 lead, which they held until the 39th minute when Selangor reduced the deficit to 2–1 courtesy of a Alvin Fortes goal. Noor Al-Rawabdeh equalised on three minutes after start of the second half, before Ismahil Akinade scored a winning goal to give Terengganu a 3–2 lead in the first leg. Two weeks later, Safuwan Baharudin's hat-trick and Reziq Bani Hani's goal in the injury time helped Selangor win 4–1 in the return leg and advance to the final, where they finished with a 6–4 aggregate victory.

== Match ==
=== Details ===
24 August 2024
21:00 MYT

Johor Darul Ta'zim	6–1	Selangor
Muñiz 26', 67', 90'; Arif Aiman 42'; Bérgson 62'; Heberty 76'	Report	Fortes 59'

Bukit Jalil National Stadium, Bukit Jalil
Attendance: 80,350
Referee: Nazmi Nasaruddin

Johor Darul Ta'zim	Selangor

GK	16	(Malaysia) Syihan Hazmi
RB	2	(Malaysia) Matthew Davies (c)
CB	14	(Australia) Shane Lowry	(yellow card) 40'	(substituted off) 85'
CB	15	(Malaysia) Feroz Baharudin
LB	24	(Philippines) Óscar Arribas		(substituted off) 90+3'
DM	4	(Malaysia) Afiq Fazail		(substituted off) 73'
CM	6	(Malaysia) Hong Wan		(substituted off) 85'
CM	20	(Spain) Juan Muñiz
RF	42	(Malaysia) Arif Aiman
CF	9	(Brazil) Bérgson
LF	37	(Brazil) Heberty	(yellow card) 28'	(substituted off) 90+3'
Substitutes:
GK	29	(Malaysia) Izham Tarmizi
DF	3	(Malaysia) Shahrul Saad		(substituted on) 85'
DF	11	(Brazil) Murilo		(substituted on) 90+3'
DF	91	(Malaysia) Syahmi Safari
MF	8	(Malaysia) Safiq Rahim
MF	10	(Portugal) Francisco Geraldes		(substituted on) 73'
MF	21	(Malaysia) Nazmi Faiz
MF	30	(Malaysia) Natxo Insa		(substituted on) 85'
FW	19	(Malaysia) Romel Morales		(substituted on) 90+3'
Coach:
(Argentina) Héctor Bidoglio

GK	23	(Malaysia) Samuel Somerville		(substituted off) 68'
RB	44	(Malaysia) Sharul Nazeem
CB	21	(Singapore) Safuwan Baharudin (c)	(yellow card) 88'
CB	55	(Malaysia) Harith Haiqal
LB	22	(Malaysia) Fazly Mazlan	(yellow card) 3'	(substituted off) 45'
CM	6	(Malaysia) Nooa Laine
CM	8	(Jordan) Noor Al-Rawabdeh	(yellow card) 40'
CM	24	(Ghana) Alex Agyarkwa		(substituted off) 45'
RW	11	(Cape Verde) Alvin Fortes
CF	9	(Chile) Ronnie Fernández	(yellow card) 66'
LW	16	(Venezuela) Yohandry Orozco
Substitutes:
GK	20	(Malaysia) Azim Al-Amin		(substituted on) 68'
DF	2	(Malaysia) Quentin Cheng		(substituted on) 45'
DF	14	(Malaysia) Zikri Khalili
DF	18	(Malaysia) Khuzaimi Piee
MF	43	(Malaysia) Syahir Bashah
MF	77	(Malaysia) Aliff Haiqal
FW	7	(Malaysia) Faisal Halim
FW	17	(Malaysia) Danial Asri
FW	99	(Jordan) Reziq Bani Hani		(substituted on) 45'
Coach:
(Malaysia) Nidzam Jamil

Man of the Match:
Juan Muñiz (Johor Darul Ta'zim)

Assistant referees:
Zairul Khalil Tan
Farhan Abdul Aziz
Fourth official:
Kamil Zakaria
Video assistant referee:
Ahmad Zuhadi Dzulkifli
Assistant video assistant referee:
Visnukumar Darmaraj

Match rules

- 90 minutes
- 30 minutes of extra time if necessary
- Penalty shoot-out if scores still level
- Nine named substitutes
- Maximum of five substitutions, with a sixth allowed in extra time (Note: Each team was given only three opportunities to make substitutions, with a fourth opportunity in extra time, excluding substitutions made at half-time, before the start of extra time and at half-time in extra time.)

== See also ==
- 2024–25 Malaysia Cup
