= 2024 Malaysia FA Cup =

Tournament details
- Country: Malaysia
- Dates: 12 June – 24 August
- Teams: 16

Final positions
- Champions: Johor Darul Ta'zim (4th title)
- Runners-up: Selangor

Tournament statistics
- Matches played: 21
- Goals scored: 85 (4.05 per match)
- Attendance: 290,506 (13,834 per match)
- Top goal scorer(s): Alvin Fortes (6 goals)
- All statistics correct as of 24 August 2024. (Note: All statistics do not include qualifying play-offs)

The 2024 Malaysia FA Cup is the 34th edition of the Malaysia FA Cup, a knockout competition for Malaysian association football clubs. The winners, if eligible, would be assured a place in the 2025–26 AFC Champions League Two group stage.

Johor Darul Ta'zim (JDT) are the two-time defending champions, having beaten Kuala Lumpur City in the last final. They retained the trophy after beating Selangor 6–1 in the final, and became the first team to win the competition in three successive seasons.

The winner of the FA Cup earns automatic qualification to the 2025–26 AFC Champions League Two group stages.

== Qualified teams ==
The FA Cup is a knockout competition with 16 teams taking part all trying to reach the final at Bukit Jalil National Stadium on 24 August 2024. The competition consisted of 13 teams from the Super League and 3 teams from A1 Semi-Pro League.

The following teams played in the competition. Reserve teams were excluded.

Malaysia Super League the 13 teams of the 2024–25 season	Malaysia A1 Semi-Pro League the 3 teams of the 2024–25 season
Johor Darul Ta'zim; Kedah Darul Aman; Kelantan Darul Naim; Kuching City; Kuala Lumpur City; Negeri Sembilan; Penang; Perak; PDRM; Sabah; Selangor; Sri Pahang; Terengganu	Kuala Lumpur Rovers; Bukit Tambun; Malaysian University

== Format ==
This season, the Malaysian Football League (MFL) announced a new format where only 16 teams will be involved in this competition, compared to the 20 teams represented last season. The final stages of the competition would feature a format change: The round of 16 would be played in a single-leg format, while the quarter-finals and semi-finals will be played two legs (home & away), except for the final which was played as a single leg. The competition does not use the away goals rule, which was abolished since 2022 season. Accordingly, if in a two-legged tie two teams scored the same number of aggregate goals, the winner of the tie would not be decided by the number of away goals scored by each team but always by 30 minutes of extra time, and if the two teams scored the same number of goals in extra time, the winner would be decided by a penalty shoot-out.

== Seeding ==
The seeded teams were drawn against the unseeded teams, with the seeded teams become hosting for the round of 16.

For the draw, the teams were seeded and unseeded into two pots based on the following principles (introduced starting this season):

- Pot A contained the final standings of top 8 teams from 2023 Super League.
- Pot B contained the final standings of 9th until 13th placed teams from 2023 Super League, and the 3 teams selected from 2024–25 A1 Semi-Pro League, based on subject approval from the MFL Board of Directors.

Key to colours
Teams from 2024–25 Malaysia Super League
Teams from 2024–25 Malaysia A1 Semi-Pro League

Pot A (seeded)
Rank	Team
1	Johor Darul Ta'zim
2	Selangor
3	Sabah
4	Kedah Darul Aman
5	Sri Pahang
6	Terengganu
7	Kuala Lumpur City
8	PDRM

Pot B (unseeded)
Rank	Team
9	Negeri Sembilan
10	Penang
11	Perak
12	Kelantan Darul Naim
13	Kuching City
14	Kuala Lumpur Rovers
15	Bukit Tambun
16	Malaysian University

== Draw dates ==
The draw for the 2024 Malaysia FA Cup was held on 16 May 2024.

Phase	Round	First leg	Second leg
Knockout phase	Round of 16	12 & 14–15 June 2024	
Knockout phase	Quarter-finals	28–29 June 2024	5–6 July 2024
Knockout phase	Semi-finals	19 July 2024	3–4 August 2024
Knockout phase	Final	24 August 2024	

== Bracket ==
The bracket was decided after the draw.

Round of 16
Sri Pahang	1 (3)
Penang (p)	1 (4)
Kedah Darul Aman	5
Bukit Tambun	0
PDRM	0
Malaysian University	3
Johor Darul Ta'zim	4
Kelantan Darul Naim	0
Terengganu	2
Perak	1
Sabah	7
Kuala Lumpur Rovers	0
Kuala Lumpur City	2
Kuching City (a.e.t.)	3
Selangor	4
Negeri Sembilan	0

Quarter-finals
Penang	0	0	0
Kedah Darul Aman	1	0	1
Malaysian University	0	0	0
Johor Darul Ta'zim	5	8	13
Terengganu	4	3	7
Sabah	0	0	0
Kuching City	2	2	4 (3)
Selangor (p)	1	3	4 (5)

Semi-finals
Kedah Darul Aman	1	0	1
Johor Darul Ta'zim	2	3	5
Terengganu	3	1	4
Selangor	2	4	6

Final
Johor Darul Ta'zim	6
Selangor	1

== Round of 16 ==
A total of 16 teams played in the Round of 16. This round would be played in a single-leg format, and consisted of all clubs from the Super League, and three from A1 Semi-Pro League. Ties were scheduled to be played in the week commencing 12 June 2024.

Key: (1) = Super League; (2) = A1 Semi-Pro League

12 June 2024	PDRM (1)	0–3	Malaysian University (2)	Selayang
20:15 UTC+8		Report	Syahir 5'; Hadi 9'; Zharif 90+2'	Stadium: Selayang Stadium; Attendance: 116; Referee: Abang Azharudin Abdullah

14 June 2024	Kuala Lumpur City (1)	2–3 (a.e.t.)	Kuching City (1)	Cheras
18:30 UTC+8	Haqimi 14'; Josué 39'	Report	Anyie 26'; Shamie 68'; Zahrul 120+3'	Stadium: Kuala Lumpur Stadium; Attendance: 309; Referee: Tuan Mohd Yaasin

14 June 2024	Sri Pahang (1)	1–1 (a.e.t.) (3–4 p)	Penang (1)	Temerloh
20:15 UTC+8	Ahapov 79'	Report	Nabil 41'	Stadium: Temerloh Mini Stadium; Attendance: 4,480; Referee: Hasrol Amir
	Penalties
	Hidalgo (penalty scored); Ahapov (penalty missed); Agüero (penalty scored); Cvetković (penalty scored); Fadhli (penalty missed)		(penalty scored) Vitor; (penalty scored) Syamer; (penalty scored) Adib; (penalty missed) Shafi; (penalty scored) Nabil

14 June 2024	Terengganu (1)	2–1	Perak (1)	Kuala Nerus
21:00 UTC+8	Safawi 36' (pen.); Pilj 42'	Report	Luiz Motta 6'	Stadium: Sultan Mizan Zainal Abidin Stadium; Attendance: 20,150; Referee: Zamzaidi Katimin

14 June 2024	Kedah Darul Aman (1)	5–0	Bukit Tambun (2)	Alor Setar
21:00 UTC+8	Gordić 15'; Amirul 21'; Assifuah 39', 68', 79'	Report		Stadium: Darulaman Stadium; Attendance: 5,436; Referee: Khairulsyahmi Ahmad Khalidi

15 June 2024	Selangor (1)	4–0	Negeri Sembilan (1)	Petaling Jaya
17:30 UTC+8	Orozco 6', 14'; Fortes 44', 67'	Report		Stadium: MBPJ Stadium; Attendance: 9,861; Referee: Nafeez Abd Wahab

15 June 2024	Sabah (1)	7–0	Kuala Lumpur Rovers (2)	Kota Kinabalu
20:15 UTC+8	Saddil 17'; Ramon 28', 45', 59'; Park 51'; Jafri 73'; Raffi 90+3' (o.g.)	Report		Stadium: Likas Stadium; Attendance: 3,900; Referee: Shukor Zulkiflee

15 June 2024	Johor Darul Ta'zim (1)	4–0	Kelantan Darul Naim (1)	Iskandar Puteri
20:15 UTC+8	Forestieri 44'; Morales 61'; Geraldes 82'; Arif Aiman 90+4' (pen.)	Report		Stadium: Sultan Ibrahim Stadium; Attendance: 11,444; Referee: Kamil Zakaria

== Quarter-finals ==
The first legs were played on 28 and 29 June, and the second legs were played on 5 and 6 July 2024.

Key: (1) = Super League; (2) = A1 Semi-Pro League

=== Summary ===
Team 1	Agg.	Team 2	1st leg	2nd leg
Penang (1)	0–1	Kedah Darul Aman (1)	0–1	0–0
Terengganu (1)	7–0	Sabah (1)	4–0	3–0
Malaysian University (2)	0–13	Johor Darul Ta'zim (1)	0–5	0–8
Kuching City (1)	4–4 (3–5 p)	Selangor (1)	2–1	2–3 (a.e.t.)

=== Matches ===
First leg

28 June 2024
20:15 MYT

Penang (1)	0–1	Kedah Darul Aman (1)
	Report	Hasbullah 73'

City Stadium, George Town
Attendance: 6,102
Referee: Ahmad Zuhadi Dzulkifli

Second leg

5 July 2024
21:00 MYT

Kedah Darul Aman (1)	0–0	Penang (1)
	Report

Darulaman Stadium, Alor Setar
Attendance: 16,700
Referee: Amirul Izwan Yaacob

Kedah Darul Aman won 1–0 on aggregate.

First leg

28 June 2024
21:00 MYT

Terengganu (1)	4–0	Sabah (1)
Ott 9'; Akinade 37', 45+3'; Pilj 42'	Report

Sultan Mizan Zainal Abidin Stadium, Kuala Nerus
Attendance: 15,677
Referee: Hasrol Amir

Second leg

6 July 2024
19:15 MYT

Sabah (1)	0–3	Terengganu (1)
	Report	Safawi 11'; Akhyar 43'; Pilj 87'

Likas Stadium, Kota Kinabalu
Attendance: 3,834
Referee: Tuan Mohd Yaasin

Terengganu won 7–0 on aggregate.

First leg

29 June 2024
17:30 MYT

Malaysian University (2)	0–5	Johor Darul Ta'zim (1)
	Report	Corbin-Ong 2'; Geraldes 48', 61'; Shahrul 71'; Morales 80'

Sultan Ibrahim Stadium, Iskandar Puteri (Note: Malaysian University applied to change the venue due to the unsuitability of their stadium, UKM Bangi Stadium, Bangi, to host the match. Their application to play at Sultan Ibrahim Stadium on the first leg, was approved by Johor Darul Ta'zim.)
Attendance: 6,490
Referee: Khairulsyahmi Ahmad Khalidi

Second leg

5 July 2024
20:15 MYT

Johor Darul Ta'zim (1)	8–0	Malaysian University (2)
Muñiz 20'; Heberty 27' (pen.), 30'; Feroz 35'; Geraldes 61'; Morales 73', 90+1'; Bérgson 78'	Report

Sultan Ibrahim Stadium, Iskandar Puteri
Attendance: 6,583
Referee: Faizudin Ismail

Johor Darul Ta'zim won 13–0 on aggregate.

First leg

29 June 2024
20:15 MYT

Kuching City (1)	2–1	Selangor (1)
Okwuosa 45+6'; Mintah 64'	Report	Fernández 31'

Sarawak State Stadium, Kuching
Attendance: 3,338
Referee: Fitri Maskon

Second leg

6 July 2024
21:00 MYT (Note: The match was temporarily suspended in the 66th minute, and delay for 20 minutes due to a floodlight failure.)

Selangor (1)	3–2 (a.e.t.)	Kuching City (1)
Zikri 27'; Fortes 38', 90+7'	Report	Shamie 15'; Alif Hassan 90+8'
Penalties
Safuwan (penalty scored); Aliff Haiqal (penalty scored); Syahir (penalty scored); Aliff Izwan (penalty scored); Harith (penalty scored)	5–3	(penalty scored) Arif Fadzilah; (penalty scored) Alif Hassan; (penalty scored) Danial Amier; (penalty missed) Tanigawa

MBPJ Stadium, Petaling Jaya
Attendance: 10,049
Referee: Suhaizi Shukri

4–4 on aggregate. Selangor won 5–3 on penalties.

== Semi-finals ==
The first legs were played on 19 July, and the second legs were played on 3 and 4 August 2024.

Key: (1) = Super League; (2) = A1 Semi-Pro League

=== Summary ===
Team 1	Agg.	Team 2	1st leg	2nd leg
Kedah Darul Aman (1)	1–5	Johor Darul Ta'zim (1)	1–2	0–3
Terengganu (1)	4–6	Selangor (1)	3–2	1–4

=== Matches ===
First leg

19 July 2024
20:15 MYT

Kedah Darul Aman (1)	1–2	Johor Darul Ta'zim (1)
Habib 87'	Report	Arribas 24'; Morales 90+9'

Darulaman Stadium, Alor Setar
Attendance: 18,317
Referee: Nazmi Nasaruddin

Second leg

4 August 2024
20:15 MYT

Johor Darul Ta'zim (1)	3–0	Kedah Darul Aman (1)
Feroz 50'; Bérgson 76'; Muñiz 83'	Report

Sultan Ibrahim Stadium, Iskandar Puteri
Attendance: 25,112
Referee: Ahmad Zuhadi Dzulkifli

Johor Darul Ta'zim won 5–1 on aggregate.

First leg

19 July 2024
21:00 MYT

Terengganu (1)	3–2	Selangor (1)
Safawi 30'; Tukhtasinov 35'; Akinade 70'	Report	Fortes 39'; Noor 48'

Sultan Mizan Zainal Abidin Stadium, Kuala Nerus
Attendance: 31,689
Referee: Hasrol Amir

Second leg

3 August 2024
21:00 MYT

Selangor (1)	4–1	Terengganu (1)
Safuwan 3', 6', 54'; Reziq 90+3'	Report	Akinade 22'

MBPJ Stadium, Petaling Jaya
Attendance: 10,569
Referee: Usaid Jamal

Selangor won 6–4 on aggregate.

== Final ==
The final will be played at the Bukit Jalil National Stadium in Kuala Lumpur.

24 August 2024
21:00 MYT

Johor Darul Ta'zim (1)	6–1	Selangor (1)
Muñiz 26', 67', 90'; Arif Aiman 42'; Bérgson 62'; Heberty 76'	Report	Fortes 59'

Bukit Jalil National Stadium, Kuala Lumpur
Attendance: 80,350
Referee: Nazmi Nasaruddin

== Top scorers ==
As of 24 August 2024

Rank	Player	Club	Goals
1	(Cape Verde) Alvin Fortes	Selangor	6
2	(Malaysia) Romel Morales	Johor Darul Ta'zim	5
2	(Spain) Juan Muñiz	Johor Darul Ta'zim	5
4	(Portugal) Francisco Geraldes	Johor Darul Ta'zim	4
4	(Nigeria) Ismahil Akinade	Terengganu	4
6	(Brazil) Bérgson	Johor Darul Ta'zim	3
6	(Brazil) Heberty	Johor Darul Ta'zim	3
6	(Ghana) Ebenezer Assifuah	Kedah Darul Aman	3
6	(Brazil) Ramon Machado	Sabah	3
6	(Singapore) Safuwan Baharudin	Selangor	3
6	(Croatia) Marin Pilj	Terengganu	3
6	(Malaysia) Safawi Rasid	Terengganu	3
13	(Malaysia) Arif Aiman	Johor Darul Ta'zim	2
13	(Malaysia) Feroz Baharudin	Johor Darul Ta'zim	2
13	(Malaysia) Shamie Iszuan	Kuching City	2
13	(Venezuela) Yohandry Orozco	Selangor	2
17	31 players	10 clubs	1

=== Own goals ===
Rank	Player	Team	Against	Date	Goal
1	(Malaysia) Raffi Nagoorgani	Kuala Lumpur Rovers	Sabah	15 June 2024	1

== See also ==
- 2024 Piala Sumbangsih
- 2024–25 Malaysia Super League
- 2024–25 Malaysia A1 Semi-Pro League
- 2024–25 Malaysia A2 Amateur League
- 2024–25 Malaysia A3 Community League
- 2024–25 MFL Cup
- 2024–25 Piala Presiden
