= 2024–25 Perak F.C. season =

Perak
2024–25 season
- Owner: XOX Berhad
- Chairman: Abdul Azim Mohd Zabidi
- Head coach: Yusri Che Lah
- Stadium: Perak Stadium
- Malaysia Super League: 7th
- Malaysia FA Cup: Round of 16
- Malaysia Cup: Quarter-finals
- Top goalscorer: League: Luciano Guaycochea (11); All: Luciano Guaycochea (11)
| Home colours | Away colours |

The 2024–25 season was the 104th season in the history of Perak and their 103rd season in the Malaysian top flight. In addition to the domestic league, the team participated in the Malaysia FA Cup and the Malaysia Cup.

== Coaching staff ==
- Head coach: Yusri Che Lah
- Assistant head coach: Shahrulnizam Mustapa
- Goalkeeper coach: Azlen Jabri
- Fitness coach: Sam Pakiaraj
- Assistant fitness coach: Abu Mutalib Baeman
- Team doctor: Loong Cheng Wern, Ahmad Hazwan
- Physiotherapist: Shaffiq Mokhtar
- Team admin: Zubir Shaharani
- Masseur: Firdaus Hassian
- Kitman: Khairul Azlan Shahridan, Azzan Shah

== Players ==
=== First-team squad ===
Note: Flags indicate national team as defined under FIFA eligibility rules; some limited exceptions apply. Players may hold more than one non-FIFA nationality.

| No. | Pos. | Nation | Player |
|---|---|---|---|
| 1 | GK | (Malaysia) MAS | Firdaus Irman |
| 2 | MF | (Nigeria) NGA | Sunday Afolabi |
| 3 | DF | (Malaysia) MAS | Tommy Mawat Bada |
| 4 | DF | (Brazil) BRA | Luiz Henrique |
| 5 | MF | (Argentina) ARG | Luciano Guaycochea (captain) |
| 6 | MF | (Malaysia) MAS | Azfar Fikri |
| 7 | FW | (Brazil) BRA | Clayton |
| 8 | DF | (Malaysia) MAS | Shivan Pillay |
| 11 | MF | (Malaysia) MAS | Wan Zack Haikal (vice-captain) |
| 12 | DF | (Malaysia) MAS | Afif Asyraf |
| 14 | MF | (Malaysia) MAS | Firdaus Saiyadi |
| 16 | MF | (Malaysia) MAS | Fadhil Idris |
| 17 | MF | (Kyrgyzstan) KGZ | Adilet Kanybekov |
| 20 | GK | (Malaysia) MAS | Haziq Nadzli (on loan from Johor Darul Ta’zim) |
| 21 | DF | (Malaysia) MAS | Kamal Arif |
| 22 | GK | (Malaysia) MAS | Ramadhan Hamid |

| No. | Pos. | Nation | Player |
|---|---|---|---|
| 23 | FW | (Malaysia) MAS | Alif Zikri |
| 26 | DF | (Malaysia) MAS | Nik Umar |
| 27 | MF | (Malaysia) MAS | Firdaus Fuad |
| 28 | MF | (Malaysia) MAS | Ariff Ar-Rasyid |
| 31 | DF | (Malaysia) MAS | Hafizy Daniel |
| 32 | DF | (Malaysia) MAS | Fadhil Azmi |
| 33 | FW | (Malaysia) MAS | Syahmi Shamsudin |
| 34 | MF | (Malaysia) MAS | Akmal Hazim |
| 35 | MF | (Malaysia) MAS | Daniel Hakimi |
| 36 | MF | (Malaysia) MAS | Danish Haikal |
| 37 | DF | (Malaysia) MAS | Che Mohamad Suhairi |
| 39 | MF | (Malaysia) MAS | Farris Izdiham |
| 40 | DF | (Malaysia) MAS | Aiman Khairul Yusni |
| 41 | MF | (Malaysia) MAS | Afifin Arfa |
| 42 | GK | (Malaysia) MAS | Syazwan Syazani |

== Competitions ==
=== Malaysia Super League ===
| 11 May 2024 1 | Terengganu | 3–1 | Perak |
| | | Report | Guaycochea 61' (pen.) |

| 18 May 2024 2 | Perak | 2–3 | PDRM |
| | Tommy 9'; Zack 89' | Report |

| 24 May 2024 3 | Kedah Darul Aman | 0–2 | Perak |
| | | Report | Lee 17', 76' |

| 23 June 2024 4 | Selangor | 2–1 | Perak |
| | | Report | Azfar 78' |

| 13 July 2024 5 | Perak | 0–2 | Penang |
| | | Report |

| 26 July 2024 6 | Kelantan Darul Naim | 1–3 | Perak |
| | | Report | Firdaus 44'; Guaycochea 57' (pen.), 79' |

| 30 July 2024 7 | Perak | 1–2 | Kuching City |
| | Zack 7' | Report |

| 14 September 2024 8 | Negeri Sembilan | 0–1 | Perak |
| | | Report | Clayton 48' |

| 21 September 2024 9 | Perak | 1–0 | Kuala Lumpur City |
| | Milunović 62' | Report |

| 28 September 2024 10 | Sri Pahang | 0–3 | Perak |
| | | Report | Guaycochea 43', 48'; Firdaus 61' |

| 19 October 2024 11 | Perak | 2–4 | Sabah |
| | Guaycochea 30' (pen.); Clayton 49' | Report |

| 26 October 2024 12 | Perak | 2–2 | Terengganu |
| | Milunović 9'; Guaycochea 57' (pen.) | Report |

| 2 November 2024 13 | PDRM | 1–1 | Perak |
| | Guaycochea 68' | Report |

| 10 November 2024 14 | Perak | 0–5 | Johor Darul Ta'zim |
| | | Report |

| 4 December 2024 15 | Perak | 1–1 | Kedah Darul Aman |
| | Clayton 71' (pen.) | Report |

| 17 December 2024 16 | Perak | 1–2 | Selangor |
| | Zack 89' | Report |

| 12 January 2025 17 | Penang | 3–3 | Perak |
| | | Report | Guaycochea 22'; Clayton 61' (pen.); Kanybekov 67' |

| 26 January 2025 18 | Perak | 7–0 | Kelantan Darul Naim |
| | Clayton 8', 56', 62', 90+3'; Guaycochea 14'; Kanybekov 24'; Tommy 69' | Report |

| 7 February 2025 19 | Kuching City | 1–1 | Perak |
| | | Report | Firdaus 18' |

| 24 February 2025 20 | Johor Darul Ta'zim | 2–0 | Perak |
| | | Report |

| 8 March 2025 21 | Perak | 0–0 | Negeri Sembilan |
| | | Report |

| 6 April 2025 22 | Kuala Lumpur City | 1–2 | Perak |
| | | Report | Guaycochea 77' (pen.); Azfar 80' |

| 12 April 2025 23 | Perak | 0–1 | Sri Pahang |
| | | Report |

| 20 April 2025 24 | Sabah | 0–1 | Perak |
| | | Report | Rawilson 29' (o.g.) |

| Pos | Team | Pld | W | D | L | GF | GA | GD | Pts | Qualification or relegation |
|---|---|---|---|---|---|---|---|---|---|---|
| 5 | Terengganu | 24 | 9 | 8 | 7 | 35 | 26 | +9 | 35 | |
| 6 | Kuala Lumpur City | 24 | 11 | 4 | 9 | 40 | 33 | +7 | 31 (Note: On 5 Aug 2024, Kuala Lumpur City were deducted six points for inaccurate or false declarations in their club licensing application.) | |
| 7 | Perak | 24 | 8 | 6 | 10 | 36 | 36 | 0 | 30 | Withdrawn from Super League (Note: Perak and Sri Pahang withdrew at end of season and dissolved. Not applying for a national licence.) |
| 8 | Sri Pahang | 24 | 7 | 8 | 9 | 35 | 39 | −4 | 29 | Withdrawn from Super League |
| 9 | PDRM | 24 | 7 | 6 | 11 | 24 | 35 | −11 | 27 | |

Source: MFL
Rules for classification: 1) Points; 2) Goal difference; 3) Goals scored;

=== Malaysia FA Cup ===
| 14 June 2024 Round of 16 | Terengganu | 2–1 | Perak |
| | | Report | Luiz Henrique 6' |

=== Malaysia Cup ===
==== Round of 16 ====
| 22 November 2024 1st leg | Kelantan Darul Naim | 0–3 | Perak |
| | | Report | Clayton 23'; Azfar 80'; Daniel 90+1' (pen.) |

| 30 November 2024 2nd leg | Perak | 3–1 (6–1 agg.) | Kelantan Darul Naim |
| | | Report | Clayton 10'; Zack 35'; Ariff 58' |

==== Quarter-finals ====
| 13 December 2024 1st leg | Perak | 0–1 | Sri Pahang |
| | | Report |

| 22 December 2024 2nd leg | Sri Pahang | 3–3 (4–3 agg.) | Perak |
| | | Report |

== Statistics ==
=== Appearances and goals ===
| No. | Pos | Nat | Player | Total | | Malaysia Super League | | Malaysia FA Cup | | Malaysia Cup | |
| No. | Pos | Nat | Player | Apps | Goals | Apps | Goals | Apps | Goals | Apps | Goals |
Goalkeepers
| 20 | GK | (Malaysia) MAS | Haziq Nadzli | 19 | 0 | 17+1 | 0 | 0 | 0 | 1 | 0 |
| 22 | GK | (Malaysia) MAS | Ramadhan Hamid | 11 | 0 | 7 | 0 | 1 | 0 | 3 | 0 |
Defenders
| 2 | DF | (Nigeria) NGA | Sunday Afolabi | 26 | 0 | 19+2 | 0 | 1 | 0 | 4 | 0 |
| 3 | DF | (Malaysia) MAS | Tommy Mawat Bada | 26 | 2 | 21+2 | 2 | 1 | 0 | 2 | 0 |
| 4 | DF | (Brazil) BRA | Luiz Henrique | 7 | 1 | 4+1 | 0 | 1 | 1 | 0+1 | 0 |
| 8 | DF | (Malaysia) MAS | Shivan Pillay | 25 | 0 | 18+2 | 0 | 1 | 0 | 4 | 0 |
| 12 | DF | (Malaysia) MAS | Afif Asyraf | 18 | 0 | 9+7 | 0 | 0 | 0 | 2 | 0 |
| 21 | DF | (Malaysia) MAS | Kamal Arif | 5 | 0 | 2+3 | 0 | 0 | 0 | 0 | 0 |
| 28 | DF | (Malaysia) MAS | Ariff Ar-Rasyid | 18 | 1 | 12+2 | 0 | 1 | 0 | 2+1 | 1 |
| 31 | DF | (Malaysia) MAS | Hafizy Daniel | 8 | 0 | 3+5 | 0 | 0 | 0 | 0 | 0 |
| 32 | DF | (Malaysia) MAS | Fadhil Azmi | 5 | 0 | 2+3 | 0 | 0 | 0 | 0 | 0 |
| 40 | DF | (Malaysia) MAS | Aiman Yusni | 18 | 0 | 10+4 | 0 | 0+1 | 0 | 2+1 | 0 |
Midfielders
| 5 | MF | (Argentina) ARG | Luciano Guaycochea | 22 | 11 | 20 | 11 | 1 | 0 | 0+1 | 0 |
| 6 | MF | (Malaysia) MAS | Azfar Fikri | 28 | 3 | 15+8 | 2 | 0+1 | 0 | 4 | 1 |
| 11 | MF | (Malaysia) MAS | Wan Zack Haikal | 27 | 5 | 17+5 | 3 | 1 | 0 | 2+2 | 2 |
| 14 | MF | (Malaysia) MAS | Firdaus Saiyadi | 27 | 4 | 11+11 | 3 | 1 | 0 | 3+1 | 1 |
| 16 | MF | (Malaysia) MAS | Fadhil Idris | 13 | 0 | 4+7 | 0 | 0 | 0 | 2 | 0 |
| 17 | MF | (Kyrgyzstan) KGZ | Adilet Kanybekov | 25 | 1 | 14+7 | 1 | 0 | 0 | 4 | 0 |
| 18 | MF | (Malaysia) MAS | Azalinullah Alias | 6 | 0 | 5+1 | 0 | 0 | 0 | 0 | 0 |
| 24 | MF | (Malaysia) MAS | Syukri Baharun | 3 | 0 | 0+3 | 0 | 0 | 0 | 0 | 0 |
| 27 | MF | (Malaysia) MAS | Firdaus Fuad | 2 | 0 | 1+1 | 0 | 0 | 0 | 0 | 0 |
| 34 | MF | (Malaysia) MAS | Akmal Hazim | 3 | 0 | 0+1 | 0 | 0 | 0 | 0+2 | 0 |
| 35 | MF | (Malaysia) MAS | Daniel Hakimi | 10 | 2 | 1+5 | 0 | 0 | 0 | 0+4 | 2 |
| 36 | MF | (Malaysia) MAS | Danish Haikal | 1 | 0 | 0 | 0 | 0 | 0 | 0+1 | 0 |
| 38 | MF | (Malaysia) MAS | Afifin Arfa | 1 | 0 | 0+1 | 0 | 0 | 0 | 0 | 0 |
| 39 | MF | (Malaysia) MAS | Farris Izdiham | 11 | 0 | 6+3 | 0 | 0 | 0 | 0+2 | 0 |
Forwards
| 7 | FW | (Brazil) BRA | Clayton | 27 | 10 | 19+3 | 8 | 0+1 | 0 | 4 | 2 |
| 23 | FW | (Malaysia) MAS | Alif Zikri | 3 | 0 | 0+2 | 0 | 0 | 0 | 0+1 | 0 |
| 33 | FW | (Malaysia) MAS | Syahmi Shamsudin | 8 | 0 | 1+7 | 0 | 0 | 0 | 0 | 0 |
Players transferred/loaned out during the season
| 10 | FW | (South Korea) KOR | Lee Tae-min | 12 | 2 | 6+3 | 2 | 1 | 0 | 0+2 | 0 |
| 15 | DF | (Philippines) PHI | Jesper Nyholm | 19 | 0 | 12+2 | 0 | 0+1 | 0 | 4 | 0 |
| 30 | MF | (Serbia) SRB | Luka Milunović | 12 | 2 | 9+1 | 2 | 1 | 0 | 1 | 0 |

Last updated: 20 April 2025
Source: Competitions
