= Ariff Ar-Rasyid =

Malaysian footballer

Personal information
- Full name: Ariff Ar-Rasyid bin Ariffin
- Date of birth: 28 December 1998 (age 27)
- Place of birth: Sepang, Malaysia
- Height: 1.76 m (5 ft 9 in)
- Positions: Right-back; defensive midfielder

Team information
- Current team: Negeri Sembilan
- Number: 28

Youth career
- 2016: Kuala Lumpur
- 2017–2018: PKNS

Senior career*
Years	Team	Apps	(Gls)
2019	PKNS	0	(0)
2020–2021	UiTM	23	(1)
2022	Penang	17	(0)
2023	Kelantan United	14	(0)
2024–2025	Perak	14	(0)
2025–	Negeri Sembilan	16	(0)

International career
2019	Malaysia U-22		
2018–2019	Malaysia U-23		
- * Club domestic league appearances and goals as of 8 June 2026

Ariff Ar-Rasyid bin Ariffin (born 28 December 1998) is a Malaysian professional footballer who plays as a right-back or defensive midfielder for Malaysia Super League club Negeri Sembilan.

== Club career ==
=== Negeri Sembilan ===
On June 18, 2025, Ariff Ar-Rasyid was announced as a new signing for Negeri Sembilan FC ahead of the 2025–26 season. He had previously played for Perak FC during the 2024–25 season. At Negeri Sembilan, he began training under head coach Nidzam Jamil.

== Career statistics ==
=== Club ===
As of 8 June 2026

Club	Season	League			Cup		League Cup		Total	
Club	Season	Division	Apps	Goals	Apps	Goals	Apps	Goals	Apps	Goals
PKNS	2019	Malaysia Super League	0	0	0	0	0	0	0	0
PKNS	Total		0	0	0	0	0	0	0	0
UiTM	2020	Malaysia Super League	10	0	0	0	0	0	10	0
UiTM	2021	Malaysia Super League	13	1	0	0	0	0	13	1
UiTM	Total		23	1	0	0	0	0	23	1
Penang	2022	Malaysia Super League	17	0	2	0	2	0	21	0
Penang	Total		17	0	2	0	2	0	21	0
Kelantan United	2023	Malaysia Super League	14	0	1	0	1	0	16	0
Kelantan United	Total		14	0	1	0	1	0	16	0
Perak	2024–25	Malaysia Super League	14	0	1	0	3	1	18	1
Perak	Total		14	0	1	0	3	1	18	1
Negeri Sembilan	2025–26	Malaysia Super League	16	0	4	0	2	0	22	0
Negeri Sembilan	2026–27	Malaysia Super League	0	0	0	0	0	0	0	0
Negeri Sembilan	Total		16	0	4	0	2	0	22	0
Career total			84	1	8	0	8	1	100	2
