= Reziq Bani Hani =

Jordanian footballer

Personal information
- Full name: Reziq Mohammed Saleh Bani Hani
- Date of birth: 28 January 2002 (age 24)
- Place of birth: Minneapolis, Minnesota, U.S.
- Height: 1.80 m (5 ft 11 in)
- Position: Striker

Team information
- Current team: Al-Faisaly
- Number: 20

Youth career
- –2020: Shabab Al-Ordon

College career
Years	Team	Apps	(Gls)
2020–2021	UMass Lowell River Hawks	24	(3)
2022	Cal State Fullerton Titans	18	(5)

Senior career*
Years	Team	Apps	(Gls)
2020	Shabab Al-Ordon		
2023–2024	Al-Faisaly	6	(9)
2024	Selangor	5	(1)
2024–2025	Al-Hussein	14	(8)
2025–2026	Al-Zawraa	6	(0)
2026	→Al-Hussein (loan)	13	(6)
2026–	Al-Faisaly	0	(0)

International career^{‡}
2018	Jordan U17	7	(4)
2020	Jordan U20	3	(2)
2023–2024	Jordan U23	13	(4)
2023–	Jordan	5	(0)
- * Club domestic league appearances and goals as of 8 May 2026 ‡ National team caps and goals as of 10 October 2025

Reziq Mohammed Saleh Bani Hani (Arabic: رزق محمد صالح بني هاني; born 28 January 2002) is a professional footballer who plays as a striker for Jordanian Pro League club Al-Faisaly. Born in the United States, he represents the Jordan national team.

== College career ==
=== Early career ===
Born in Minneapolis to a Jordanian family and raised in Irbid, he attended Model Arab Secondary School in Jordan. He trialed at Fortuna Düsseldorf in 2018.

=== UMass Lowell River Hawks ===
He played as a freshman and sophomore at UMass Lowell River Hawks, playing a total of 24 games and registering 3 goals.

=== Cal State Fullerton Titans ===
Bani Hani transferred to the Cal State Fullerton Titans for the 2022 season. On 1 November 2022, Banihani was named on the All-Big West Second Team, after registering 5 goals and 6 assists.

== Club career ==
=== Shabab Al-Ordon ===
Bani Hani began his professional career at Shabab Al-Ordon in 2020.

=== Al-Faisaly ===
Upon finishing his junior year, Bani Hani signed with Al-Faisaly in 2023. He made his AFC Champions League debut, coming on as a substitute in the group stage match against Nasaf. On 27 November 2023, Reziq scored his first Champions League goal in a 3–1 away lost against Nasaf in the fifth group stage match.

=== Selangor ===
On 4 May 2024, Reziq signed a contract with Malaysia Super League club Selangor. He made his first Super League appearance on 18 May, coming on as an 70th-minute substitute for Yohandry Orozco in a 1–0 win against Kedah Darul Aman at the MBPJ Stadium. Following week, Reziq scored his first goal for Selangor in the league win at home against Negeri Sembilan. On 3 August 2024, Reziq scored a second half in Selangor's 4–1 victory over Terengganu at the MBPJ Stadium in the second leg of their FA Cup semi-finals. His goal in the 93rd minute, sent his team into a FA Cup final for the first time since 2018.

=== Al-Hussein ===
On 10 September 2024, Bani Hani signed a contract with Jordanian Pro League club Al-Hussein.

=== Al-Zawraa ===
On 30 July 2025, Bani Hani joined Iraq Stars League club Al-Zawraa on a two-season contract.

==== Al-Hussein (loan) ====
On 6 January 2026, Bani Hani returned to Al-Hussein on a short loan.

== International career ==
Reziq was a youth international for Jordan, having represented the Jordanian under-17, under-20 and under-23 teams. He represent the national team under-23 for the 2024 AFC U-23 Asian Cup that took place in Qatar. In December 2023, Reziq was included in the Jordan national team for the preliminary 30-man squad for the 2023 AFC Asian Cup in Qatar. However, he failed to make the cut. Later that year, on 30 August 2024, he made his international debut in a friendly match against North Korea.

== Career statistics ==
=== Club ===
As of 8 August 2024

Club	Season	League			Cup (Note: Includes Jordan FA Cup and Malaysia FA Cup)		League Cup (Note: Includes Jordan Shield Cup and Malaysia Cup)		Continental (Note: Includes AFC Champions League and AFC Champions League Two)		Total	
Club	Season	Division	Apps	Goals	Apps	Goals	Apps	Goals	Apps	Goals	Apps	Goals
Al-Faisaly	2023–24	Jordanian Pro League	6	9	0	0	1	1	6	2	13	12
Al-Faisaly	Total		6	9	0	0	1	1	6	2	13	12
Selangor	2024–25	Malaysia Super League	5	1	2	1	0	0	0	0	7	2
Selangor	Career total		11	10	2	1	1	1	6	2	20	14

=== International ===
As of match played 6 September 2024

Appearances and goals by national team and year
National team	Year	Apps	Goals
Jordan	2024	2	0
Total		2	0

== Honours ==
Al-Faisaly

- Jordan Shield Cup: 2023

Al-Hussein

- Jordanian Pro League: 2024–25
- Jordan Super Cup: 2025
