= Khind Holdings =

Malaysian home appliance manufacturer

Khind Holdings Berhad
- Company type: Public Limited Company
- Traded as: MYX: 7062
- ISIN: MYL7062OO002
- Industry: Household Electrical Appliance Maker
- Founded: 1961
- Founder: Cheng King Fa
- Headquarters: Shah Alam, Malaysia
- Area served: Worldwide
- Revenue: MYR 559 million (31 December 2022)
- Number of employees: 810 (Dec 2014)
- Subsidiaries: Khind-Mistral (M) Sdn Bhd, Khind-Mistral Industries Sdn Bhd, Khind Alliances Sdn Bhd, Khind Electrical (Malaysia) Sdn Bhd, Khind-Mistral (Borneo) Sdn Bhd, Khind Middle East Fze, Khind Systems (Singapore) Pte Ltd, Khind Electrical & Environmental (Singapore) Pte Ltd, Mistral (Singapore) Pte Ltd, Mayer Marketing Pte Ltd, Khind Electrical (Hong Kong) Limited, Khind Environmental Solutions (Indonesia)
- Website: khind.com.my

Khind Holdings Berhad (Khind; MYX: 7062) is a producer and marketer of home consumer electrical appliances and an industrial electrical company with a revenue of RM325 million in 2013. Khind employs over 800 staff with 11 branch offices in Malaysia and a manufacturing plant in Sekinchan, Selangor. With operations in the ASEAN region, Middle East, North Africa and Europe – Khind exports to over 60 countries.

Regionally, through its subsidiaries, Khind is also a marketer for high-end home consumer appliance brands including KitchenAid, Ariston, and Bugatti; while its industrial electrical solutions subsidiaries help distribute brands such as Relite (a specialist air cooling brand) and Swisher (specialist in industrial cleaning solutions) and Augier (medium voltage transformers).
