= Umar Eshmurodov =

Uzbekistani footballer

Umarbek Eshmurodov
- Eshmurodov in 2025

Personal information
- Full name: Umarbek Yusuf oʻgʻli Eshmurodov
- Date of birth: 30 November 1992 (age 33)
- Place of birth: Koson, Uzbekistan
- Height: 1.85 m (6 ft 1 in)
- Position: Centre-back

Team information
- Current team: Nasaf
- Number: 92

Senior career*
Years	Team	Apps	(Gls)
2013–2017	Shurtan	62	(2)
2017–2019	Nasaf	27	(0)
2020–2021	Pakhtakor	0	(0)
2020	→ Nasaf (loan)	24	(0)
2021–2023	Nasaf	70	(3)
2024	Selangor	12	(1)
2025–	Nasaf	45	(1)

International career^{‡}
2020–2026	Uzbekistan	40	(0)
Medal record
Representing Uzbekistan
CAFA Nations Cup
Runner-up	2023 Kyrgyzstan–Uzbekistan	Team
- * Club domestic league appearances and goals as of 8 September 2026 ‡ National team caps and goals as of 27 March 2026 (UTC)

Umarbek Yusuf oʻgʻli Eshmurodov (born 30 November 1992) is an Uzbekistani footballer who currently plays as a centre-back for Uzbekistan Super League club Nasaf.

Eshmurodov made his debut for the Uzbekistan senior national team on 23 February 2020 in a friendly match against Belarus.

Named to the Uzbekistan national team squad for the 2026 FIFA World Cup.

== Club career ==
Eshmurodov began playing football at the Olympic Reserve College in Qarshi. He later joined the academy of Shurtan, where he started playing for the club's youth team in 2012.

Eshmurodov began to be involved with the first team during the second half of the 2013 season. From 2014 onward, he became a regular starter for the club and remained with Shurtan despite its relegation to the second division. In 2015, he helped the team secure promotion back to the Uzbekistan Super League. He continued to play for Shurtan until 2017.

In the summer of 2017, Eshmurodov transferred to Nasaf. He quickly established himself as one of the team's key players and was later appointed captain. In 2020, reports emerged regarding a potential move to Pakhtakor. However, the defender effectively remained with Nasaf, initially spending a year on loan with the Qarshi-based club. Upon the expiration of the loan, he returned to Nasaf as a free agent with the agreement of Pakhtakor.

Following his return, Nasaf entered one of the most successful periods in the club's history. Over the next several seasons, the team won the Uzbekistan Cup three times and the Uzbekistan Super Cup once. Nasaf also reached the AFC Cup final and advanced from the group stage of the AFC Champions League on two occasions. Throughout this period, Eshmurodov served as the team's captain.

At the end of 2023, Eshmurodov's contract with Nasaf expired, and he received an offer from Selangor, one of the most popular football clubs in Malaysia. At the age of 31, he accepted the offer and joined a foreign club for the first time in his professional career.

== International career ==
Eshmurodov made his debut for the Uzbekistan national team in 2020 at the age of 27. His first appearance for the national side came in a friendly match against Belarus on 23 February 2020, which Uzbekistan lost 1–0. He started the match and was substituted at halftime by head coach Vadim Abramov.

Eshmurodov was not called up again by Abramov until nearly a year and a half later, when he was included in the squad for a 2022 FIFA World Cup qualification match against Singapore in June 2021. He played the full 90 minutes in Uzbekistan's 5–0 victory.

Since January 2022, under head coach Srečko Katanec, Eshmurodov has been a regular member of the national team. At the 2023 AFC Asian Cup, he played all five matches for Uzbekistan and completed every game without being substituted.

On 2 June 2026, he was included in the 26-man squad selected by head coach Fabio Cannavaro for the 2026 FIFA World Cup, marking the country's first-ever appearance in the tournament.

== Career statistics ==
=== International ===
As of match played 23 January 2023

Uzbekistan
Year	Apps	Goals
2020	1	0
2021	2	0
2022	8	0
2023	11	0
2024	3	0
Total	25	0

== Honours ==
Shurtan

- Uzbekistan Pro League: 2014

Nasaf

- Uzbekistan Super League runner-up: 2017, 2020, 2023
- Uzbekistan Cup: 2021, 2023
