= Feroz Baharudin =

Malaysian footballer

Personal information
- Full name: Muhamad Feroz bin Baharudin
- Date of birth: 2 April 2000 (age 26)
- Place of birth: Kota Tinggi, Johor, Malaysia
- Height: 1.82 m (6 ft 0 in)
- Position: Centre-back

Team information
- Current team: Johor Darul Ta'zim
- Number: 15

Youth career
- 2013–2017: SSMP
- 2018–2020: Johor Darul Ta'zim III

Senior career*
Years	Team	Apps	(Gls)
2020–2021	Johor Darul Ta'zim II	0	(0)
2020–	Johor Darul Ta'zim	42	(4)

International career^{‡}
2016	Malaysia U16	1	(0)
2018	Malaysia U19	3	(0)
2023–	Malaysia	5	(0)
Medal record
AFF U-19 Youth Championship
First place	2018 Indonesia
- * Club domestic league appearances and goals as of 17 January 2026 ‡ National team caps and goals as of 16 November 2024

Muhammad Feroz bin Baharudin (born 2 April 2000) is a Malaysian professional footballer who plays as a centre-back for Malaysia Super League club Johor Darul Ta'zim and the Malaysia national team.

== Club career ==
=== Johor Darul Ta'zim ===
Feroz was a product of Johor Darul Ta'zim youth system from 2018 where he plays for Johor Darul Ta'zim III before getting promoted to the Johor Darul Ta'zim II team.

On 2 October 2020, Feroz made his debut for the main team of Johor Darul Ta'zim coming on as a substitution against Sabah in a 4–1 win.

In the 2022 season, Feroz was promoted to the main team where he played the full match against Sri Pahang on 7 October 2022. He scored his first goal and also recorded an assist in a 6–0 thrashing win over Kedah Darul Aman on 9 April 2023. Feroz made his AFC Champions League debut on 3 October 2023 against Thailand club BG Pathum United in a 4–2 away win.

On 22 October 2024, Feroz scored his first international goal for Johor Darul Ta'zim in an AFC Champions League Elite match against Korean club Gwangju FC in a 3–1 away loss.

== International career ==
Feroz made his debut for the Malaysia national team on 23 March 2023 in a friendly match against Turkmenistan which resulted in a 1–0 win.

== Career statistics ==
=== Club ===
As of 16 December 2023.

Club	Season	League			Cup		Continental		Other		Total	
Club	Season	Division	Apps	Goals	Apps	Goals	Apps	Goals	Apps	Goals	Apps	Goals
Johor Darul Ta'zim	2020	Malaysia Super League	1	0	0	0	—		0	0	1	0
Johor Darul Ta'zim	2021	Malaysia Super League	0	0	0	0	0	0	0	0	0	0
Johor Darul Ta'zim	2022	Malaysia Super League	3	0	0	0	0	0	0	0	3	0
Johor Darul Ta'zim	2023	Malaysia Super League	23	2	4	1	0	0	0	0	27	3
Career total			27	2	4	1	0	0	0	0	31	3

=== International ===
As of 14 October 2024

Appearances and goals by national team and year
National team	Year	Apps	Goals
Malaysia	2023	2	0
Malaysia	2024	3	0
Total		5	0

== Honours ==
=== Club ===
Johor Darul Ta'zim

- Malaysia Super League: 2022, 2023, 2024–25
- Malaysia FA Cup: 2022, 2023, 2024
- Malaysia Cup: 2022, 2023, 2024–25
- Piala Sumbangsih: 2023, 2024, 2025

=== International ===
Malaysia U19

- AFF U-19 Youth Championship:2018

Malaysia

- Pestabola Merdeka: 2024

=== Individual ===
- FAM Football Awards – Best Defender: 2024–25
- Malaysia Super League Team of the Season: 2024–25
