= Harith Haiqal =

Malaysian footballer

Personal information
- Full name: Harith Haiqal bin Adam Afkar
- Date of birth: 22 June 2002 (age 24)
- Place of birth: Klang, Selangor, Malaysia
- Height: 1.79 m (5 ft 10 1/2 in)
- Position: Centre-back

Team information
- Current team: Selangor
- Number: 55

Youth career
- 2017–2019: Mokhtar Dahari Academy

Senior career*
Years	Team	Apps	(Gls)
2020–	Selangor II	27	(4)
2021–	Selangor	56	(7)

International career^{‡}
2019–2021	Malaysia U19	7	(2)
2021–2023	Malaysia U23	5	(0)
2024–	Malaysia	15	(1)
Medal record
Men's football
Representing Malaysia
Malaysia U-22
Merlion Cup
Winner	2023
Malaysia
FIFA ASEAN Cup
Third place	2026
Merdeka Tournament
Winner	2024
- * Club domestic league appearances and goals as of 27 May 2026 ‡ National team caps and goals as of 6 October 2026

Harith Haiqal bin Adam Afkar (born 22 June 2002) is a Malaysian professional footballer who plays as a centre-back for Malaysia Super League club Selangor and the Malaysia national team.

== Early life ==
Harith began his career in football after being spotted by the NFDP officials while he was playing for his school's under-12 side before joining the Mokhtar Dahari Academy (AMD). He was a striker at the beginning of his football journey, but his talent in handling the defence line as a central defender started with the AMD team and shines in that position up until now.

== Club career ==
=== Selangor ===
Harith became one of the AMD players who signed his first professional contract with Selangor after graduating from high school. He then managed to be listed with the Selangor II team after displaying an impressive performance during the three cornered match against the other young Selangor players handled by German coach, Michael Feichtenbeiner at the end of 2019.

On 31 July 2021, Harith made his debut for the first team in the 2021 Malaysia Super League matches against Penang; which he came on as substitute.

On 25 November 2021, Selangor confirmed that Harith would be definitely promoted to Selangor's first team for 2022 season.

During the 2024–25 AFC Champions League Two fixture against Korean giants Jeonbuk Hyundai Motors on 23 October 2024, Harith was chosen as the captain during the match as both club captains, Safuwan Baharuddin and Noor Al-Rawabdeh was out due to injury. Harith went on to score the opening goal in the match and guided the team to a historic 2–1 win against the Korean club.

== International career ==
=== Youth ===
Harith was part of the 2018 AFC U-16 Championship squad. He was later selected for the national under-23 team for the 2022 AFC U-23 Asian Cup qualification, helping the squad to reach the final tournament.

In March 2023, Harith was listed for the Merlion Cup tournament held in Singapore. He successfully won the trophy for the first time with the Malaysia U22 squad.

=== Senior ===
In March 2024, Harith was called up to the Malaysia national team for their 2026 FIFA World Cup qualification matches. He made his debut for Malaysia on 14 October 2024 during a friendly match against New Zealand at the North Harbour Stadium.

In September 2024, Harith was listed in the 2024 Merdeka Tournament. In the tournament, Malaysia successfully won the championship for the 13th time by defeating Lebanon.

On 14 November 2024, Harith scored his first international goal in a friendly match against Laos at the PAT Stadium in Thailand.

== Career statistics ==
=== Club ===
As of match played 27 May 2026

Appearances and goals by club, season and competition
Club	Season	League			Cup		League Cup		Continental		Other		Total	
Club	Season	Division	Apps	Goals	Apps	Goals	Apps	Goals	Apps	Goals	Apps	Goals	Apps	Goals
Selangor II	2020	Malaysia Premier League	10	0	—								10	0
Selangor II	2021	Malaysia Premier League	17	4	—								17	4
Selangor II	Total		27	4	0	0	0	0	0	0	0	0	27	4
Selangor	2021	Malaysia Super League	2	0	0	0	2	0	—				4	0
Selangor	2022	Malaysia Super League	8	0	0	0	1	0	—				9	0
Selangor	2023	Malaysia Super League	11	3	2	0	3	1	—				16	4
Selangor	2024–25	Malaysia Super League	19	3	5	0	2	0	6 (Note: Appearances in AFC Champions League Two)	1	3 (Note: Appearance(s) in MFL Challenge Cup)	0	35	4
Selangor	2025–26	Malaysia Super League	16	1	5	0	2	0	3	0	8 (Note: Appearance(s) in ASEAN Club Championship)	0	34	1
Selangor	Total		56	7	12	0	10	1	9	1	11	0	98	9
Career total			83	11	12	0	10	1	9	1	11	0	125	13

=== International ===
As of matches played 6 October 2026.

Appearances and goals by national team and year
National team	Year	Apps	Goals
Malaysia	2024	2	1
Malaysia	2025	8	0
Malaysia	2026	5	0
Total		15	1

International goals

No.	Date	Venue	Opponent	Score	Result	Competition
1.	14 November 2024	PAT Stadium, Bangkok, Thailand	Laos	1–0	3–1	Friendly

== Honours ==
Selangor

- Malaysia Cup runner-up: 2022
- Malaysia Cup runner-up: 2022
- Malaysia Super League runner-up: 2023
- MFL Challenge Cup: 2024-25

Malaysia U22

- Merlion Cup: 2023

Malaysia

- Merdeka Tournament: 2024
