= Lee Tae-min (footballer) =

South Korean footballer (born 2003)

Personal information
- Date of birth: 9 May 2003 (age 23)
- Place of birth: South Korea
- Height: 1.77 m (5 ft 10 in)
- Position: Forward

Youth career
- 2011–2013: Namhae Elementary School
- 2014–2015: Suncheon Jungang Elementary School
- 2016–2018: Pohang Steelers
- 2019–2021: Busan IPark

Senior career*
Years	Team	Apps	(Gls)
2021–2024	Busan IPark	24	(0)
2022	→ Gimpo (loan)	18	(0)
2023	→ Jeonnam Dragons (loan)	0	(0)
2024	Perak	11	(2)

International career^{‡}
2020	South Korea U17	3	(1)
- * Club domestic league appearances and goals as of 17 October 2022 ‡ National team caps and goals as of 14:18, 25 July 2021 (UTC)

- Lee Tae-min
- Hangul: 이태민
- Hanja: 李泰民
- RR: I Taemin
- MR: I T'aemin

Lee Tae-min (Korean: 이태민; born 9 May 2003) is a South Korean footballer who plays as a forward.

== Club career ==
=== Busan IPark ===
On 26 February 2021, Lee was promoted to the senior squad of Busan IPark. On 7 March, he make his debut for the club in a 2–1 in over Daejeon Hana Citizen.

==== Gimpo (loan) ====
On 20 June 2022, Lee joined K League 2 club Gimpo on loan until 31 December 2022.

==== Jeonnam Dragons (loan) ====
On 20 July 2023, Lee joined another K League 2 club, Jeonnam Dragons on loan until the end of the season.

=== Perak ===
In March 2024, Lee moved to Southeast Asia to joined Malaysia Super League club, Perak. On 24 May, he scored a brace to defeat Kedah Darul Aman 2–0 which is also his first professional career goal. He left the team in December 2024

== International career ==
Lee played for South Korea U17 in 2020 where he played against Portugal U17, Spain U17 and also scoring a goal in a 8–2 defeat to Germany U17.

== Career statistics ==
=== Club ===
As of 17 October 2022

Club	Season	League			Cup		Continental		Other		Total	
Club	Season	Division	Apps	Goals	Apps	Goals	Apps	Goals	Apps	Goals	Apps	Goals
Busan IPark	2021	K League 2	16	0	1	0	–		0	0	17	0
Busan IPark	2022	K League 2	8	0	1	0	–		0	0	9	0
Gimpo (loan)	2022	K League 2	18	0	0	0	–		0	0	18	0
Jeonnam Dragons (loan)	2023	K League 2	0	0	0	0	0	0	0	0	0	0
Career total			42	0	2	0	0	0	0	0	44	0
