= Nidzam Jamil =

Malaysian footballer and coach

Mohd Nidzam Jamil
Personal information
- Full name: Mohd Nidzam bin Jamil
- Date of birth: 15 April 1980 (age 46)
- Place of birth: Kajang, Selangor, Malaysia
- Height: 1.88 m (6 ft 2 in)
- Position: Defender

Team information
- Current team: Negeri Sembilan (head coach)

Youth career
- 1998–1999: Selangor

Senior career*
Years	Team	Apps	(Gls)
1999–2004	Selangor		
2005–2006	PKNS		
2006–2007	Negeri Sembilan		
2007–2008	Proton		

International career^{‡}
2000–2001	Malaysia U-23	6	(1)
2002–2003	Malaysia	4	(1)

Managerial career
- 2010–2013: SPA
- 2014: SPA (technical director)
- 2015: AirAsia
- 2016–2017: Malaysian University
- 2017–2018: FELDA United (assistant)
- 2018–2020: FELDA United
- 2022–2024: Selangor (assistant)
- 2024: Selangor
- 2025–2026: Negeri Sembilan
- * Club domestic league appearances and goals as of November 22, 2021 ‡ National team caps and goals as of 23 December 2015

Mohd Nidzam bin Jamil (born 15 April 1980) is a former Malaysian footballer. He is also a former member of the Malaysia national team who is recently the head coach of Malaysia Super League club Negeri Sembilan.

== Personal life ==
Nidzam also appeared in Malaysia satellite TV channel Astro Arena as football pundit or as guest commentator in their Malaysian football league programmes. His late brother Zaid Jamil was also a footballer and had represented Selangor and Malaysia.

In 2018, his football life has been featured in a Digi Hari Raya short clip called Niat or Nawaitu. The clip features the life of Nidzam Jamil and his late brother.

== Club career ==
He spent the majority of his professional career at Selangor F.A. He has started his career in football at the age of 18 in President Cup squad. He also played with PKNS, Negeri Sembilan FA and Proton.

Due to injuries and multiple operations on his ankle and knees, he decided to stop playing at the age of 28 and started to concentrate in coaching arena.

== International career ==
Nidzam has played for Malaysia national team, and the Malaysia under-23 team. Both teams he played for were then under the charge of Allan Harris.

He scored his only international goal in the 2002 AFF Championship competition, a penalty against Laos in the group stage.

== International goals ==
#	Date	Venue	Opponent	Score	Result	Competition
1.	22 December 2002	Bishan Stadium, Singapore	Laos	1–0	1–1	2002 Tiger Cup

== Managerial career ==
=== SPA ===
At the age of 32, Nidzam is one of the youngest coaches to win the senior national level championship title in Malaysia as a coach, for SPA in the 2012 Malaysia FAM League. Also in 2012 Malaysia FA Cup tournament, he guided the team to the quarter-final, where SPA became the first team from FAM League to reach this stage so far.

=== Air Asia ===
Nidzam has also coached AirAsia in the FAM League and guided the Malaysia University Football team in 29th World University Games Summer Universiade at Taipei 2017.

=== FELDA United ===
In 2017, he was appointed as assistant head coach of FELDA United. After B. Sathianathan left his post as the team's head coach in November 2018, Nidzam was promoted to the head coach position on 12 October 2018.

=== Selangor ===
After 18 years, on 22 November 2021, Nidzam officially returned to his "home" again and was appointed as assistant coach for Michael Feichtenbeiner.

On 9 August 2022, Selangor announced that the management and Michael Feichtenbeiner had mutually agreed to let go of his position as the head coach of the club and to continue the football development project as sporting director which he has held since 2020. In the meantime, the head coach responsibilities were taken up by Nidzam as the club's interim head coach for the remainder of the 2022 season. Nidzam was then moved to assistant head coach after Selangor appointed Tan Cheng Hoe as the new head coach.

In the 2024–25 season, Nidzam was appointed as the new head coach after Tan Cheng Hoe left his post to joined Thai League 1 side Police Tero. After a half-year in charge, Nidzam Jamil left the club by mutual consent on 30 October 2024, despite successfully managing the teams and maintaining their top form in competitions, including guided the team all the way to the FA Cup final.

=== Negeri Sembilan ===
On 13 June 2025, Negeri Sembilan FC announced the appointment of Nidzam as head coach for the 2025–26 season. With extensive coaching experience and a focus on developing young players, he was tasked with leading the team, which included several new local and foreign signings, including three key local players.

== Managerial statistics ==
As of 23 February 2026

Managerial record by team and tenure
Team	Nat.	From	To	Record					Ref.
Team	Nat.	From	To	G	W	D	L	Win %	Ref.
Petaling Jaya Rangers	(Malaysia)	1 January 2015	28 March 2016	21	6	5	10	28.57	
Felda United	(Malaysia)	12 October 2018	30 November 2020	46	10	14	22	21.74	
Selangor (caretaker)	(Malaysia)	9 August 2022	23 September 2022	5	1	1	3	20.00	
Selangor	(Malaysia)	16 March 2024	30 October 2024	21	13	3	5	61.90	
Negeri Sembilan	(Malaysia)	13 June 2025	23 February 2026	24	7	6	11	29.17	
Career Total				117	37	29	51	31.62	

== Honours ==
=== Player ===
Selangor

- Malaysia Cup: 2002
- Malaysia Charity Shield: 2002

=== International ===
Malaysia U-23

- SEA Games : (silver) silver 2001

=== Manager ===
SPA F.C.

- Malaysia FAM League: 2012
