= Alvin Fortes =

Cape Verdean footballer (born 1994)

Personal information
- Full name: Alvin Mateus Fortes
- Date of birth: 25 May 1994 (age 32)
- Place of birth: Rotterdam, Netherlands
- Height: 1.75 m (5 ft 9 in)
- Position: Winger

Team information
- Current team: Al-Fahaheel

Youth career
- Sparta
- UVS
- Feyenoord
- 2013: Heinenoord
- 2013: Nike Academy

Senior career*
Years	Team	Apps	(Gls)
2013	Kemi Kings	6	(1)
2014–2015	RKC	10	(1)
2015–2016	TOP Oss	15	(1)
2016	Boluspor	5	(0)
2016–2017	Veria	0	(0)
2017	Vitesse II	13	(2)
2017–2018	Zbrojovka Brno	12	(1)
2018	Dila Gori	15	(4)
2019–2020	Dila Gori	34	(9)
2020–2021	Kaisar	14	(1)
2021	AGMK	18	(3)
2022–2024	Ratchaburi	19	(7)
2022–2023	→ Nongbua Pitchaya (loan)	13	(4)
2024–2026	Selangor	42	(19)
2026–	Al-Fahaheel	0	(0)

International career
2018–2025	Cape Verde	2	(0)
- * Club domestic league appearances and goals as of 2 May 2026

Alvin Mateus Fortes (Dutch: [ˈal.fɪn] Portuguese: [mɐ.ˈtewʃ ˈfɔɾ.tɨʃ]; born 25 April 1994) is a Cape Verdean professional footballer who plays as a winger for Kuwait Premier League club Al-Fahaheel.

== Club career ==
Born in Rotterdam, Fortes played for Sparta Rotterdam, UVS and Feyenoord's youth setups before joining SV Heinenoord in June 2013. However, in July, he was spotted by Nike Academy's program The Chance, and was assigned to their squad.

=== PS Kemi Kings ===
On 4 September 2013, Fortes signed his first professional contract, joining Finnish Kakkonen side PS Kemi Kings. He appeared in six matches for the club, scoring once, as his side narrowly missed out promotion.

=== RKC Waalwijk ===
In March 2014, Fortes was about to join Dordrecht, being initially assigned to their youth setup, but the deal later collapsed where in August, he moved to RKC Waalwijk. Fortes made his professional debut on 22 August 2014, coming on as a second half substitute in a 3–2 away win against Den Bosch for the Eerste Divisie championship. He scored his first goal on 17 October, netting the first in a 2–0 home win against Telstar.

=== Vitesse ===
On 10 December 2014, Fortes signed a two-and-a-half-year contract with Eredivisie side Vitesse, but being assigned to the youth squad until the end of the campaign. Only two months later, his contract was rescinded.

== International career ==
Fortes was born in the Netherlands and is of Cape Verdean descent and has expressed his willingness to represent Cape Verde internationally.

Fortes made his professional debut for the Cape Verde national team in a friendly 3–2 win over Algeria on 1 June 2018.

After seven years hiatus, Fortes made his return to the national team in a friendly match against Malaysia on 29 May 2025.
