= Ronnie Fernández =

Chilean footballer (born 1991)

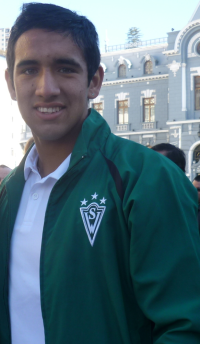
- Fernández with Santiago Wanderers in 2010

Personal information
- Full name: Ronnie Alan Fernández Sáez
- Date of birth: 30 January 1991 (age 35)
- Place of birth: Punta Arenas, Chile
- Height: 1.85 m (6 ft 1 in)
- Position: Striker

Team information
- Current team: Palestino

Youth career
- Santiago Wanderers

Senior career*
Years	Team	Apps	(Gls)
2009–2016	Santiago Wanderers	79	(19)
2012	→ Deportes Puerto Montt (loan)	35	(10)
2013	→ Naval (loan)	19	(6)
2014	→ Deportes Concepción (loan)	18	(2)
2016	Deportivo Cali	19	(2)
2017	Bolívar	22	(7)
2017–2020	Al-Fayha	54	(23)
2019	→ Al-Nasr (loan)	12	(4)
2020	Santiago Wanderers	11	(0)
2021	Al-Raed	15	(3)
2021	Santiago Wanderers	11	(3)
2022	Universidad de Chile	26	(5)
2023	Bolívar	26	(18)
2024–2025	Selangor	20	(10)
2025–	Palestino	0	(0)

International career
2022–	Chile	5	(0)
- * Club domestic league appearances and goals as of 21 May 2025

Ronnie Alan Fernández Sáez (born 30 January 1991) is a Chilean professional footballer who plays as a striker for Palestino.

== Career ==
On 9 July 2017, Fernández signed a three-year contract with Saudi Arabian club Al-Fayha for a fee of €1.75 million. He made his debut on 10 August 2017 against Al-Hilal and scored the opening goal with a penalty kick, but in the end his team lost 2–1.

Fernández was the top scorer of the Saudi Professional League of the 2017–18 season, scoring 13 goals in 25 matches.

On 26 March 2019, Fernández scored the opening goal against Arsenal in a 3–2 defeat at the recently renovated Al Maktoum Stadium.

Fernández scored a hat-trick against Al-Ittihad on 19 December 2019 in a 4–1 win.

In 2024, Fernández left Bolivian club Bolívar and signed with Malaysia Super League side Selangor.

Fernández returned to his homeland in May 2025 and signed with Palestino.

== International career ==
Fernández was included in Chile national team squad for the 2022 FIFA World Cup qualification against Brazil and Uruguay. He made his debut on 24 March 2022, coming as a substitute in a 4–0 defeat against Brazil in Maracanã Stadium.

== Career statistics ==
=== Club ===
As of match played 19 April 2025

Appearances and goals by club, season and competition
Club	Season	League			Cup (Note: Appearance in Copa Chile, Copa Colombia, Crown Prince Cup, King Cup, UAE President's Cup, Copa de la División Profesional and Malaysia FA Cup)		Continental		Other		Total	
Club	Season	Division	Apps	Goals	Apps	Goals	Apps	Goals	Apps	Goals	Apps	Goals
Santiago Wanderers	2010	Chilean Primera División	5	0	0	0	–		–		5	0
Santiago Wanderers	2011	Chilean Primera División	6	0	0	0	–		–		6	0
Santiago Wanderers	2013	Chilean Primera División	4	0	0	0	–		–		4	0
Santiago Wanderers	2014–15	Chilean Primera División	32	4	8	6	2 (Note: Appearance in Copa Sudamericana)	1	–		42	11
Santiago Wanderers	2015–16	Chilean Primera División	32	15	5	2	–		–		37	17
Santiago Wanderers	Total		79	19	13	8	2	1	0	0	94	28
Puerto Montt (loan)	2012	Primera B de Chile	35	10	0	0	–		–		35	10
Naval (loan)	2013–14	Primera B de Chile	19	6	5	1	–		–		24	7
Concepción (loan)	2013–14	Primera B de Chile	18	2	0	0	–		–		18	2
Deportivo Cali	2016	Categoría Primera A	19	2	4	0	–		–		23	2
Bolívar	2016–17	Bolivian Primera División	22	7	0	0	–		–		22	7
Al-Fayha	2017–18	Saudi Professional League	25	13	1	0	–		–		26	13
Al-Fayha	2018–19	Saudi Professional League	14	3	2	0	–		–		16	3
Al-Fayha	2019–20	Saudi Professional League	15	7	1	0	–		–		16	7
Al-Fayha	2020–21	Saudi Professional League	0	0	0	0	–		–		0	0
Al-Fayha	Total		54	23	4	0	0	0	0	0	58	23
Al-Nasr (loan)	2018–19	UAE Pro League	12	4	0	0	1 (Note: Appearance in AFC Champions League)	0	1 (Note: Appearance in UAE League Cup)	0	14	4
Santiago Wanderers	2020	Chilean Primera División	11	0	0	0	–		–		11	0
Al Raed	2020–21	Saudi Professional League	15	3	0	0	–		–		15	3
Santiago Wanderers	2021	Chilean Primera División	11	3	0	0	–		–		11	3
Universidad de Chile	2022	Chilean Primera División	26	5	6	0	–		2 (Note: Appearance in Torneos de Verano)	1	34	6
Bolívar	2023	Bolivian Primera División	26	18	14	1	9 (Note: Appearance in Copa Libertadores)	4	–		49	23
Selangor	2024–25	Malaysia Super League	20	10	6	1	6 (Note: Appearance in AFC Champions League Two)	1	7 (Note: Appearance in Malaysia Cup and MFL Challenge Cup)	4	39	16
Career total			367	112	52	11	18	6	10	5	447	134

=== International ===
As of match played 30 March 2022

Appearances and goals by national team and year
National team	Year	Apps	Goals
Chile	2022	5	0
Total		5	0

== Honours ==
=== Club ===
==== Selangor ====
- MFL Challenge Cup: 2024–25

=== Individual ===
- Saudi Pro League Top goalscorer: 2017-18
