= Yohandry Orozco =

Venezuelan footballer (born 1991)

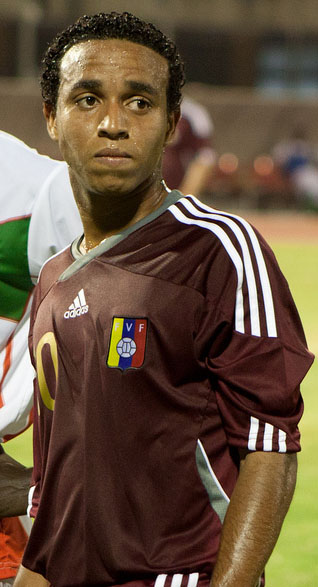

Personal information
- Full name: Yohandry José Orozco Cujía
- Date of birth: 19 March 1991 (age 35)
- Place of birth: Maracaibo, Venezuela
- Height: 1.68 m (5 ft 6 in)
- Position: Attacking midfielder

Team information
- Current team: Carabobo

Youth career
- Beracasa
- Centro Gallego
- 2006–2007: Maracaibo

Senior career*
Years	Team	Apps	(Gls)
2007–2009	Maracaibo	23	(2)
2009–2011	Zulia	41	(11)
2011–2013	VfL Wolfsburg	7	(0)
2013–2015	Deportivo Táchira	68	(15)
2016	New York Cosmos	22	(7)
2017	Zulia	32	(11)
2018–2019	Deportes Tolima	33	(4)
2019–2020	Puebla	5	(1)
2019	→ Atlético Junior (loan)	6	(0)
2020	→ Santa Fe (loan)	6	(0)
2021–2023	Deportes Tolima	46	(5)
2023–2025	Selangor	45	(11)
2025–	Carabobo	15	(8)

International career^{‡}
2009	Venezuela U20	7	(2)
2010–	Venezuela	25	(1)
- * Club domestic league appearances and goals as of 13 November 2023 ‡ National team caps and goals as of 19 November 2014

Yohandry José Orozco Cujía (born 19 March 1991) is a Venezuelan footballer who plays as an attacking midfielder for Carabobo.

== Club career ==
=== In Venezuela ===
Orozco made his professional debut in 2007 with Unión Atlético Maracaibo, aged 16, against Deportivo Anzoátegui. On 2009 he signed with Zulia FC, having a strong presence in the main squad. In the 2010–11 season he became a basic key in the lineup of the Zulians, scoring eight goals in the first half of the tournament.

=== VfL Wolfsburg ===
On 28 January 2011, it was reported that Orozco would sign a four-year contract with VfL Wolfsburg, pending a medical test and economical terms with Zulia FC. He is the third Venezuelan player in the Fußball-Bundesliga, after Juan Arango and Tomás Rincón. The deal was completed on 31 January. The 19-year-old has put pen to paper on a deal that will run until 30 June 2015. With only 1.64 m in height, he is the shortest player to ever being fielded in the German Bundesliga. He never managed to fit a spot in the regular lineup, playing only seven games since his arrival.

=== Return to homeland ===
After an unsuccessful period in German football, it was reported on 1 June 2013 that he will be signing for Venezuelan team Deportivo Táchira in a three-year contract.

=== New York Cosmos ===
On 29 January 2016, he signed with the New York Cosmos of the North American Soccer League.

== Club statistics ==
Accurate as of 2 September 2012

Club	Season	League		Cup		Continental		Total	
Club	Season	Apps	Goals	Apps	Goals	Apps	Goals	Apps	Goals
Maracaibo	2007–08	15	1	-	-	—		15	1
Maracaibo	2008–09	8	1	-	-	—		8	1
Maracaibo	Total	23	2	-	-	—		23	2
Zulia	2009–10	26	3	1	0	—		27	3
Zulia	2010–11	15	8	0	0	—		15	8
Zulia	Total	41	11	1	0	—		42	11
VfL Wolfsburg	2010–11	0	0	0	0	—		0	0
VfL Wolfsburg	2011–12	5	0	0	0	2	0	7	0
VfL Wolfsburg	2012–13	2	0	0	0	1	0	3	0
VfL Wolfsburg	Total	7	0	0	0	3	0	10	0
Deportivo Táchira	2013–14	34	12	10	2	—		44	14
Deportivo Táchira	2014–15	34	3	0	0	8	0	42	3
Deportivo Táchira	Total	68	15	10	2	8	0	86	17
Career totals		139	28	11	2	11	0	161	30

== International career ==
As an Under-20 international, having played the 2009 FIFA U-20 World Cup, he also was in the squad for the 2011 South American Youth Championship. In this tournament, on 24 January 2011, he scored a noticed goal against Perú, in an individual play.

He made his debut with the senior team on 3 March 2010, in a friendly match against Panamá. In June 2011, Orozco joined the squad who played the 2011 Copa América and went on to finish in fourth place.

=== International goals ===
No.	Date	Venue	Opponent	Score	Result	Competition	Ref.
1.	14 August 2013	Pueblo Nuevo, San Cristóbal, Venezuela	Bolivia	2–2	2–2	Friendly	

== Honours ==
=== Club ===
Deportes Tolima

- Categoría Primera A (2): 2018-I, 2021-I
- Superliga Colombiana (1): 2022

=== International ===
Venezuela national team

- Copa América 4th place (copper medal): 2011
