= Noor Al-Rawabdeh =

Jordanian footballer

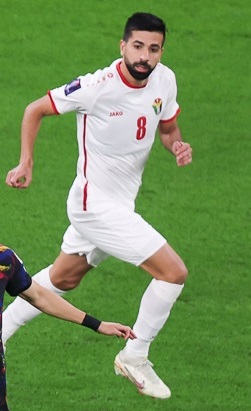
- Al-Rawabdeh with Jordan at the 2023 AFC Asian Cup.

Personal information
- Full name: Noor Al-Deen Mahmoud Ali Al-Rawabdeh
- Date of birth: 24 February 1997 (age 29)
- Place of birth: Amman, Jordan
- Height: 1.79 m (5 ft 10 in)
- Position: Midfielder

Team information
- Current team: Al-Faisaly
- Number: 8

Senior career*
| Years | Team | Apps | (Gls) |
| 2017–2021 | Al-Jazeera | 1 | (1) |
| 2021 | Al-Muharraq | 0 | (0) |
| 2022 | Al-Faisaly | 2 | (2) |
| 2023–2026 | Selangor | 43 | (8) |
| 2026– | Al-Faisaly | 0 | (0) |

International career^{‡}
| 2018–2020 | Jordan U23 | 6 | (0) |
| 2019– | Jordan | 69 | (3) |
Medal record
Representing Jordan
Men's football
AFC Asian Cup
| Runner-up | 2023 Qatar | Team |
- * Club domestic league appearances and goals as of 17 January 2026 ‡ National team caps and goals as of 10 September 2024

Noor Al-Deen Mahmoud Ali Al-Rawabdeh (Arabic: نُور الدِّيْن مَحمُود عَلِيّ الرَّوَّابدَة; born 24 February 1997) is a Jordanian professional footballer who plays as a midfielder for Jordanian Pro League club Al-Faisaly and the Jordan national team.

== International career ==
Al-Rawabdeh debuted for the Jordan national team in a 1–1 2019 WAFF Championship tie with Kuwait on 8 August 2019.

=== International goals ===
| No | Date | Venue | Opponent | Score | Result | Competition |
|---|---|---|---|---|---|---|
| 1. | 14 June 2022 | Jaber Al-Ahmad International Stadium, Kuwait City, Kuwait | Kuwait | 3–0 | 3–0 | 2023 AFC Asian Cup qualification |
| 2. | 11 June 2024 | KSU Stadium, Riyadh, Saudi Arabia | Saudi Arabia | 2–1 | 2–1 | 2026 FIFA World Cup qualification |
| 3. | 10 September 2024 | Kuala Lumpur Stadium, Kuala Lumpur, Malaysia | Palestine | 3–1 | 3–1 | 2026 FIFA World Cup qualification |

== Honours ==
=== Club ===
Al-Muharraq

- AFC Cup: 2021
- Bahraini FA Cup: 2021

Al-Jazeera

- Jordan FA Cup: 2017–18

Selangor

- MFL Challenge Cup: 2024–25

=== International ===
Jordan

- AFC Asian Cup runner-up: 2023

Individual

- ASEAN Club Championship: Allstar XI 2025–26
