= 2026 ASEAN Club Championship final =

Association football match

- Event: ASEAN Club Championship
Selangor	Buriram United
(Malaysia)	(Thailand)
1	3

First leg
Selangor	Buriram United
0	1
- Date: 20 May 2026
- Venue: Petaling Jaya Stadium, Petaling Jaya
- Shopee Star of the Match: Hugo Boumous (Selangor)
- Referee: Rustam Lutfullin (Uzbekistan)
- Attendance: 8,943

Second leg
Buriram United	Selangor
2	1
- Date: 27 May 2026
- Venue: Buriram Stadium, Buriram
- Shopee Star of the Match: Theerathon Bunmathan (Buriram United)
- Referee: Hiroki Kasahara (Japan)
- Attendance: 30,889

The 2026 ASEAN Club Championship final was the final match of the 2025–26 ASEAN Club Championship, the 4th season of Southeast Asia's premier club football tournament organised by ASEAN Football Federation (AFF). It was played on 20 May 2026 for the first leg and 27 May 2026 for the second leg, between Thai club Buriram United, the defending champions, and Malaysian club Selangor. This was the first final to include the reigning champions on this competition.

Buriram United won the match 3–1 on aggregate for their second title. By winning the title, Buriram United became the first team to successfully defend the ASEAN Club Championship.

== Previous finals ==
Team	Previous final appearances (bold indicates winners)
(Thailand) Buriram United	1 (**2025**)
(Malaysia) Selangor	None

== Venue ==
The 2 venues were pre-determined on rotation basis based on the winners of the semi-finals.

== Route to the final ==
Note: In all results below, the score of the finalist is given first (H: home; A: away).

(Malaysia) Selangor				Round	(Thailand) Buriram United			
Opponent	Result			Group stage	Opponent	Result		
(Thailand) Buriram United	1–1 (A)			Matchday 1	(Malaysia) Selangor	1–1 (H)		
(Singapore) Tampines Rovers	4–2 (H)			Matchday 2	(Thailand) BG Pathum United	2–2 (A)		
(Philippines) Dynamic Herb Cebu	1–1 (A)			Matchday 3	(Vietnam) Công An Hà Nội	1–1 (H)		
(Vietnam) Công An Hà Nội	2–0 (H)			Matchday 4	(Singapore) Tampines Rovers	4–1 (A)		
(Thailand) BG Pathum United	1–1 (H)			Matchday 5	(Philippines) Dynamic Herb Cebu	6–0 (H)		
**Group A runners-up**: Pos / Team / Pld / Pts; 1 / (Thailand) Buriram United / 5 / 9; **2** / (Malaysia) Selangor / **5** / 9; 3 / (Thailand) BG Pathum United / 5 / 8; 4 / (Vietnam) Công An Hà Nội / 5 / 7; 5 / (Singapore) Tampines Rovers / 5 / 6; 6 / (Philippines) Dynamic Herb Cebu / 5 / 1; Source: ASEAN United FC				Final standings	**Group A winners**: Pos / Team / Pld / Pts; **1** / (Thailand) Buriram United / **5** / 9; 2 / (Malaysia) Selangor / 5 / 9; 3 / (Thailand) BG Pathum United / 5 / 8; 4 / (Vietnam) Công An Hà Nội / 5 / 7; 5 / (Singapore) Tampines Rovers / 5 / 6; 6 / (Philippines) Dynamic Herb Cebu / 5 / 1; Source: ASEAN United FC			
Opponent	Agg.	1st leg	2nd leg	Knockout stage	Opponent	Agg.	1st leg	2nd leg
(Vietnam) Nam Định	4–1	2–1 (H)	2–0 (A)	Semi-finals	(Malaysia) Johor Darul Ta'zim	4–3	3–1 (A)	1–2 (a.e.t.) (H)

== Match ==
=== Details ===
Team 1	Agg.	Team 2	1st leg	2nd leg
Selangor (Malaysia)	1–3	(Thailand) Buriram United	0–1	1–2

==== First leg ====
20 May 2026
21:00 UTC+8

Selangor (Malaysia)	0–1	(Thailand) Buriram United
	Report	Suphanat 25'

Petaling Jaya Stadium, Petaling Jaya
Attendance: 8,943
Referee: Rustam Lutfullin (Uzbekistan)

**Selangor**	**Buriram United**

GK	31	(Malaysia) Sikh Izhan
RB	2	(Malaysia) Quentin Cheng		(substituted off) 82'
CB	21	(Singapore) Safuwan Baharudin
CB	4	(Ghana) Richmond Ankrah		(substituted off) 46'
LB	3	(Jordan) Mohammad Abualnadi		(substituted off) 78'
CM	6	(Malaysia) Nooa Laine		(substituted off) 90+1'
CM	8	(Jordan) Noor Al-Rawabdeh
RW	11	(Cape Verde) Alvin Fortes	(yellow card) 45+4'
AM	9	(France) Hugo Boumous	(yellow card) 35'
LW	7	(Malaysia) Faisal Halim (c)
CF	91	(Brazil) Chrigor
Substitutes:
GK	21	(Malaysia) Azim Al-Amin
GK	33	(Malaysia) Kalamullah Al-Hafiz
DF	55	(Malaysia) Harith Haiqal	(yellow card) 90+4'	(substituted on) 78'
DF	93	(Malaysia) Fazly Mazlan
DF	14	(Malaysia) Zikri Khalili	(yellow card) 54'	(substituted on) 46'
DF	36	(Malaysia) Aiman Yusuf
MF	10	(Malaysia) Mukhairi Ajmal		(substituted on) 82'
MF	28	(Malaysia) Muhammad bin Khalil
MF	43	(Malaysia) Syahir Bashah		(substituted on) 82'
MF	77	(Malaysia) Aliff Haiqal
MF	42	(Malaysia) Harry Danish
MF	76	(Malaysia) Aliff Izwan
Manager:
(South Korea) Kim Pan-gon

GK	13	(Philippines) Neil Etheridge	(yellow card) 86'
RW	22	(South Korea) Ko Myeong-seok	(yellow card) 80'
AM	16	(Australia) Kenny Dougall (c)
AM	40	(Brazil) Eduardo Mancha		(substituted off) 90+1'
LW	2	(Thailand) Sasalak Haiprakhon
CB	19	(Ghana) Kingsley Schindler		(substituted off) 90+1'
CB	44	(Austria) Peter Žulj
CB	5	(Thailand) Theerathon Bunmathan	(yellow card) 35'
DM	32	(Austria) Robert Žulj
DM	10	(Thailand) Suphanat Mueanta	(yellow card) 57'	(substituted off) 70'
CF	9	(Thailand) Supachai Chaided	(yellow card) 72'
Substitutes:
GK	34	(Thailand) Chatchai Budprom
DF	3	(Thailand) Pansa Hemviboon		(substituted on) 90+3'
DF	75	(Thailand) Shinnaphat Leeaoh		(substituted on) 90+1'
MF	33	(Thailand) Thanakrit Chotmuangpak
MF	8	(Thailand) Ratthanakorn Maikami
MF	27	(Thailand) Phitiwat Sukjitthammakul		(substituted on) 70'
MF	15	(Thailand) Narubadin Weerawatnodom
FW	54	(Thailand) Nathakorn Ratthanasuwan
Manager:
(England) Mark Jackson

Shopee Star of the Match:
Hugo Boumous (Selangor)
Assistant referees:
Akmal G'iyosov (Uzbekistan)
Sanjar Shayusupov (Uzbekistan)
Fourth official:
Ngô Duy Lân (Vietnam)
Video assistant referee:
Choi Hyun-jai (South Korea)
Assistant video assistant referee:
no data

**Match rules**

- 90 minutes
- Maximum of twelve named substitutes
- Maximum of five substitutions
- Maximum of three substitution opportunities

==== Second leg ====
27 May 2026
19:00 UTC+7

Buriram United (Thailand)	2–1	(Malaysia) Selangor
Suphanat 27'; Theerathon 55'	Report	Bashah 18'

Buriram Stadium, Buriram
Attendance: 30,889
Referee: Hiroki Kasahara (Japan)

**Buriram United**	**Selangor**

GK	13	(Philippines) Neil Etheridge
CB	40	(Brazil) Eduardo Mancha
CB	16	(Australia) Kenny Dougall (c)
CB	3	(Thailand) Pansa Hemviboon		(substituted off) 29'
RM	19	(Ghana) Kingsley Schindler
CM	5	(Thailand) Theerathon Bunmathan	(red card) 90+9'
CM	32	(Austria) Robert Žulj	(yellow card) 88'	(substituted off) 90+6'
CM	44	(Austria) Peter Žulj
LM	2	(Thailand) Sasalak Haiprakhon
CF	7	(Brazil) Guilherme Bissoli
CF	10	(Thailand) Suphanat Mueanta	(yellow card) 61'	(substituted off) 78'
Substitutes:
GK	34	(Thailand) Chatchai Budprom
DF	75	(Thailand) Shinnaphat Leeaoh	(yellow card) 90+9'	(substituted on) 78'
DF	15	(Thailand) Narubadin Weerawatnodom
MF	33	(Thailand) Thanakrit Chotmuangpak
MF	8	(Thailand) Ratthanakorn Maikami
MF	55	(Thailand) Phitiwat Sukjitthammakul		(substituted on) 90+6'
FW	9	(Thailand) Supachai Chaided		(substituted on) 29'
FW	54	(Thailand) Nathakorn Ratthanasuwan
Manager:
(England) Mark Jackson

GK	31	(Malaysia) Sikh Izhan Nazrel
RB	2	(Malaysia) Quentin Cheng		(substituted off) 80'
CB	66	(Senegal) Mamadou Diarra		(substituted off) 81'
CB	21	(Singapore) Safuwan Baharudin
LB	14	(Malaysia) Zikri Khalili		(substituted off) 69'
CM	6	(Malaysia) Nooa Laine
CM	43	(Malaysia) Syahir Bashah		(substituted off) 63'
CM	9	(France) Hugo Boumous	(yellow card) 86'
RW	98	(Brazil) Vitor Pernambuco
CF	91	(Brazil) Chrigor	(yellow card) 86'
LW	7	(Malaysia) Faisal Halim (c)
Substitutes:
GK	20	(Malaysia) Azim Al-Amin
GK	33	(Malaysia) Kalamullah Al-Hafiz
DF	36	(Malaysia) Aiman Yusuf
DF	55	(Malaysia) Harith Haiqal		(substituted on) 81'
DF	93	(Malaysia) Fazly Mazlan
MF	10	(Malaysia) Mukhairi Ajmal		(substituted on) 80'
MF	19	(South Korea) Jeon Seung-min		(substituted on) 63'
MF	28	(Malaysia) Muhammad Khalil
MF	42	(Malaysia) Harry Danish
MF	76	(Malaysia) Aliff Izwan
MF	77	(Malaysia) Haiqal Lau
FW	11	(Cape Verde) Alvin Fortes	(yellow card) 85'	(substituted on) 69'
Manager:
(South Korea) Kim Pan-gon

Shopee Star of the Match:
Theerathon Bunmathan (Buriram United)

Assistant referees:
Takeshi Akada (Japan)
Satoshi Michiyama (Japan)
Fourth official:
Ahmad A'Qashah (Singapore)
Video assistant referee:
Muhammad Taqi (Singapore)
Assistant video assistant referee:
Naufal Adya Fairuski (Indonesia)

**Match rules**

- 90 minutes
- 30 minutes of extra time if necessary
- Penalty shoot-out if scores still level
- Maximum of twelve named substitutes
- Maximum of five substitutions, with a sixth allowed in extra time
- Maximum of three substitution opportunities, with a fourth allowed in extra time
