= 2025 Piala Sumbangsih =

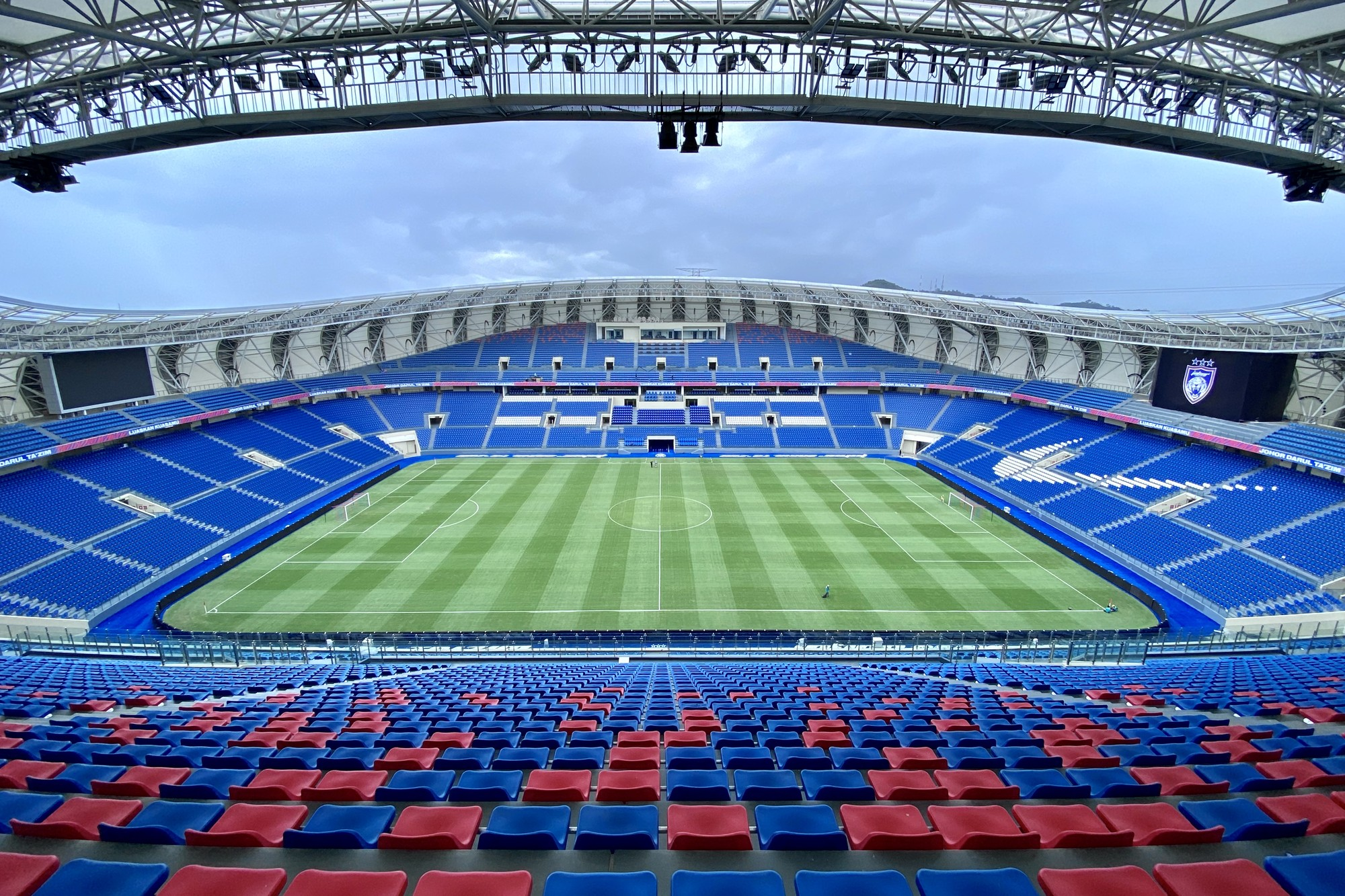
- Sultan Ibrahim Stadium was scheduled to host the match
Johor Darul Ta'zim	Selangor
3	0
- Date: 8 August 2025
- Venue: Sultan Ibrahim Stadium, Iskandar Puteri, Johor
- Man of the Match: Jairo (Johor Darul Ta'zim)
- Referee: Nazmi Nasaruddin
- Attendance: 32,777

The 2025 Piala Sumbangsih (also known as Malaysian Charity Shield) is the scheduled 40th edition of the Malaysian Charity Shield, an annual football match played between the winners of the previous season's Malaysia Super League and Malaysia FA Cup. It will be played at Sultan Ibrahim Stadium in Johor on 8 August 2025, and will feature the domestic treble (Note: Winners of the 2024–25 Malaysia Super League, 2024 Malaysia FA Cup, and 2024–25 Malaysia Cup.) winners Johor Darul Ta'zim and the 2024–25 Malaysia Super League runners-up Selangor.

== Background ==
Johor Darul Ta'zim (JDT) qualified for their eleventh consecutive Charity Shield match as winners of the 2024–25 Super League. JDT also won the 2024 Malaysia FA Cup and the 2024–25 Malaysia Cup, beating Selangor 6–1 in the former, and defeating Sri Pahang 2–1 in 2025 Malaysia Cup final to complete their triple quadruple.

Since JDT won the triple quadruple, Selangor qualified by default as 2024–25 Super League runners-up. They are looking to win the Charity Shield for the first time since 2010, when they beat Negeri Sembilan 2–1 at Tuanku Abdul Rahman Stadium. It was the third time that the Charity Shield had been contested between the two teams.

== Match ==
=== Details ===
8 August 2024
21:00 MYT

Johor Darul Ta'zim	3–0	Selangor
Jairo 2'; Israfilov 64'; Arif 73'	Report

Sultan Ibrahim Stadium, Iskandar Puteri
Attendance: 32,777
Referee: Nazmi Nasaruddin

Johor Darul Ta'zim	Selangor

GK	16	(Malaysia) Syihan Hazmi
CB	13	(South Korea) Park Jun-heong	(yellow card) 20'
CB	17	(Malaysia) Jon Irazabal		(substituted off) 78'
CB	23	(Azerbaijan) Eddy Israfilov
RM	42	(Malaysia) Arif Aiman		(substituted off) 87'
CM	8	(Malaysia) Hector Hevel
CM	28	(Spain) Nacho Méndez		(substituted off) 90+3'
LM	33	(Argentina) Jonathan Silva		(substituted off) 78'
RW	11	(Brazil) Jairo
CF	25	(Malaysia) João Figueiredo
LW	70	(Spain) Samu Castillejo (c)		(substituted off) 26'
Substitutes:
GK	1	(Malaysia) Christian Abad
DF	3	(Malaysia) Shahrul Saad		(substituted on) 78'
DF	24	(Philippines) Óscar Arribas		(substituted on) 87'
MF	4	(Malaysia) Afiq Fazail
MF	30	(Malaysia) Natxo Insa		(substituted on) 78'
FW	9	(Brazil) Bérgson	(substituted on) 26'	(substituted off) 78'
FW	19	(Malaysia) Romel Morales
FW	37	(Brazil) Heberty
FW	94	(Mali) Moussa Sidibé		(substituted on) 78'
Coach:
(Spain) Xisco Muñoz

GK	33	(Malaysia) Kalamullah Al-Hafiz
CB	3	(Jordan) Mohammad Abualnadi
CB	4	(Ghana) Richmond Ankrah
CB	44	(Malaysia) Sharul Nazeem
RM	2	(Malaysia) Quentin Cheng		(substituted off) 78'
CM	6	(Malaysia) Nooa Laine
CM	40	(England) Zach Clough		(substituted off) 89'
LM	5	(Thailand) Kevin Deeromram		(substituted off) 78'
RW	91	(Brazil) Chrigor		(substituted off) 45'
CF	9	(Brazil) Willian Lira
LW	7	(Malaysia) Faisal Halim (c)	(yellow card) 17'	(substituted off) 59'
Substitutes:
GK	23	(Malaysia) Samuel Somerville
DF	14	(Malaysia) Zikri Khalili
DF	22	(Malaysia) Moses Raj
MF	10	(Malaysia) Mukhairi Ajmal		(substituted on) 78'
MF	37	(Thailand) Picha Autra
MF	76	(Malaysia) Aliff Izwan		(substituted on) 78'
MF	77	(Malaysia) Aliff Haiqal		(substituted on) 59'
FW	11	(Cape Verde) Alvin Fortes		(substituted on) 45'
FW	42	(Malaysia) Harry Danish		(substituted on) 89'
Coach:
(Japan) Katsuhito Kinoshi

Man of the Match:
Jairo (Johor Darul Ta'zim)

Assistant referees:
Zairul Khalil Tan
Hamdi Haji Omar
Fourth official:
Firdaus Dahlan
Video assistant referee:
Ahmad Zuhadi Dzulkifli
Assistant video assistant referee:
Hadi Danny Valentino

Match rules

- 90 minutes
- Penalty shoot-out if scores still level
- Nine named substitutes, of which six may be used
