= 2025–26 Selangor F.C. season =

2025–26 season of Malaysian association football club

Selangor
2025–26 season
- Chairman: Tengku Amir Shah
- Manager: Mahfizul Rusydin
- Head coach: Katsuhito Kinoshi (until 26 September); Christophe Gamel (interim; 26 September – 5 January); Kim Pan-gon (from 5 January)
- Stadium: MBPJ Stadium
- Super League: 3rd
- FA Cup: Semi-finals
- Malaysia Cup: Semi-finals
- Charity Shield: Runners-up
- AFC Champions League Two: Group stage (4th)
- ASEAN Club Championship: Runners-up
- Top goalscorer: League: (23 goals); Chrigor; All: (42 goals); Chrigor
- Highest home attendance: 10,015; Malaysia Cup; Selangor vs Negeri Sembilan (14 February 2026)
- Lowest home attendance: 1,815; ASEAN Club Championship; Selangor vs Tampines Rovers (24 September 2025)
- Average home league attendance: 4,879
- Biggest win: 9–0 vs Malaysian University (H), 13 September 2025, FA Cup
- Biggest defeat: 0–3 vs Johor Darul Ta'zim (A), 8 August 2025, Super League
Home colours	Away colours	Third colours

The 2025–26 season is Selangor's 20th season in the Super League and their 40th consecutive season in the top flight of Malaysian football. The club also participates in the Charity Shield, Malaysia Cup, FA Cup, AFC Champions League Two and ASEAN Club Championship, entering the ASEAN competition for the first time in its history.

Selangor played their official home matches for the entire season at the MBPJ Stadium following Shah Alam Stadium was closed for major renovation and rebuild work. This season was the first without Khairulazhan Khalid since 2016, who departed to Penang following his expiring contract.

Katsuhito Kinoshi began the campaign in his second year as head coach, but was dismissed in September following a poor start to the season. The club's coach under-23 Christophe Gamel assumed interim charge before Kim Pan-gon was appointed as head coach on 5 January.

== Kits ==
- Supplier: Joma
- Sponsor: PKNS & MBI (front) / KHIND (shoulder)

Home	Away	Third	ACL Two home	ACL Two away	ACC home	ACC away
Goalkeeper 1	Goalkeeper 2	Goalkeeper 3	Goalkeeper ACL Two	Goalkeeper ACC 1	Goalkeeper ACC 2

== Review ==
Selangor began the new season under the guidance of head coach Katsuhito Kinoshi, who led the team to a Challenge Cup victory last season, aiming to continue their pursuit of domestic and regional success. During the previous season, Selangor concluded the Super League as runners-up, thus securing the qualification to the AFC Champions League Two for the second consecutive year. Selangor competed in the Charity Shield against domestic treble winners Johor Darul Ta'zim for the second consecutive season, even though they withdrew from the match last season due to the threat of criminal activity they faced. On 23 May 2025, Selangor was chosen to represent the nation's football clubs in the ASEAN Club Championship, according to slot determination rules from the ASEAN governing body, after the Malaysian Football League (MFL) revealed the qualification requirements for the Malaysian League clubs.

== Players ==
=== First team ===
No.	Player	Nat.	Position(s)	Date of birth (age)	Signed	Signed from	Noted
Goalkeepers
31	Sikh Izhan Nazrel	(Malaysia)	GK	23 March 2002 (aged 24)	2021	Selangor U-23	
33	Kalamullah Al-Hafiz	(Malaysia)	GK	30 July 1995 (aged 30)	2024	Kedah Darul Aman	
Defenders
2	Quentin Cheng	(Malaysia) (Australia)	RB / RWB	20 November 1999 (aged 26)	2020	(Australia) Sutherland Sharks	
3	Mohammad Abualnadi	(Jordan) (United States)	CB / LB / LWB	8 February 2001 (aged 25)	2024	(Iraq) Al-Qasim	
4	Richmond Ankrah	(Ghana)	CB	22 February 2000 (aged 26)	2022	(Ghana) Accra Lions	
14	Zikri Khalili	(Malaysia)	LB / RB	25 June 2002 (aged 23)	2020	Selangor U-23	
21	Safuwan Baharudin (C)	(Singapore)	CB / DM / CM	22 September 1991 (aged 34)	2023	Negeri Sembilan	
44	Sharul Nazeem	(Malaysia)	CB	16 November 1999 (aged 26)	2021	Selangor U-23	
55	Harith Haiqal	(Malaysia)	CB / DM	22 June 2002 (aged 23)	2021	Selangor U-23	
66	Mamadou Diarra	(Senegal)	CB / RB	20 December 1997 (aged 28)	2025	Unattached	
93	Fazly Mazlan	(Malaysia)	LB / LWB	22 December 1993 (aged 32)	2025	Unattached	
Midfielders
6	Nooa Laine	(Malaysia) (Finland)	AM / CM / DM	22 November 2002 (aged 23)	2024	(Finland) SJK Seinäjoki	
8	Noor Al-Rawabdeh	(Jordan)	CM / DM	24 February 1997 (aged 29)	2023	(Jordan) Al-Faisaly	
9	Hugo Boumous	(France)	AM / CM / LM	24 July 1995 (aged 30)	2026	(India) Odisha	(Note: On loan.)
10	Mukhairi Ajmal	(Malaysia)	CM / LM / LW / AM	7 November 2001 (aged 24)	2019	PKNP	
19	Jeon Seung-min	(South Korea)	CM / AM / DM	15 December 2000 (aged 25)	2026	Unattached	
24	Alex Agyarkwa	(Ghana)	CM / DM	18 July 2000 (aged 25)	2021	(Ghana) Accra Lions	
43	Syahir Bashah	(Malaysia)	LM / RM / AM	16 September 2001 (aged 24)	2022	Perak	
76	Aliff Izwan	(Malaysia)	CM / AM / CF	10 February 2004 (aged 22)	2023	Selangor U-23	
77	Aliff Haiqal	(Malaysia)	CM / LM / RM	11 July 2000 (aged 25)	2020	PKNS	
96	Mahamé Siby	(France)	DM / CM	7 July 1996 (aged 29)	2026	(Sweden) Malmö FF	
Forwards
7	Faisal Halim (VC)	(Malaysia)	LW / RW / LM / RM	7 January 1998 (aged 28)	2022	Terengganu	
11	Alvin Fortes	(Cape Verde)	RW / LW / AM	25 May 1994 (aged 32)	2024	(Thailand) Ratchaburi	
17	Kim Ji-ho	(South Korea)	LW / RW	28 January 2003 (aged 23)	2026	(South Korea) Suwon Samsung Bluewings	
91	Chrigor	(Brazil)	CF / LW / RW	13 November 2000 (aged 25)	2025	(Thailand) Buriram United	
98	Vitor Pernambuco	(Brazil)	RW / SS / LW	28 April 1998 (aged 28)	2026	Unattached	
Out on loan
23	Samuel Somerville	(Malaysia)	GK	6 August 1994 (aged 31)	2021	Penang	
37	Picha Autra	(Thailand)	CM / DM / AM	7 January 1996 (aged 30)	2025	(Thailand) Muangthong United	
48	Omid Musawi	(Afghanistan)	LW / RW / CF	1 January 2001 (aged 25)	2025	(Malaysia) Selangor U-23	
Player left the club during the season
5	Kevin Deeromram	(Thailand)	LB / LWB	11 September 1997 (aged 28)	2025	(Thailand) Port	
9	Willian Lira	(Brazil)	CF / RW / LW	9 December 1993 (aged 32)	2025	(United Arab Emirates) Hatta	
17	Toni Domgjoni	(Kosovo)	CM / DM / AM	4 September 1998 (aged 27)	2025	Unattached	
40	Zach Clough	(England)	AM / CM / RW / LW	8 March 1995 (aged 30)	2025	(Australia) Adelaide United	

=== Reserve team ===
No.	Player	Nat.	Position(s)	Date of birth (age)	Signed	Signed from	Noted
Selangor U-23
20	Azim Al-Amin	(Malaysia)	GK	20 September 2001 (aged 24)	2024	Kuala Lumpur City	
22	Moses Raj	(Malaysia)	CB	10 August 2005 (aged 20)	2025	Perak	
28	Muhammad Khalil	(Malaysia)	DM	11 April 2005 (aged 21)	2024	Selangor U-23	
30	Haykal Danish	(Malaysia)	RW / LW	5 May 2005 (aged 21)	2024	Selangor U-23	
32	Raimi Shamsul	(Malaysia)	RB / RM	28 October 2002 (aged 23)	2024	Selangor U-23	
35	Aiman Hakimi	(Malaysia)	CB / RB	28 January 2005 (aged 21)	2024	Selangor U-23	
38	Abdul Rahman	(Malaysia) (Syria)	CM / AM	4 December 2004 (aged 21)	2022	Selangor U-23	
39	Danish Iskandar	(Malaysia)	CM / AM	24 June 2006 (aged 19)	2025	Selangor U-23	
42	Harry Danish	(Malaysia)	RW / LW	29 April 2004 (aged 22)	2024	Selangor U-23	

== Transfers ==
=== Loan returns ===
Date	Pos.	No.	Player	Age	From	Type	Fee	Ref.
First team
30 April 2025	DF	4	(Ghana) Richmond Ankrah	25	(Malaysia) Penang	Loan return	N/A	N/A
30 April 2025	GK	31	(Malaysia) Sikh Izhan Nazrel	23	(Malaysia) Penang	Loan return	N/A	N/A
30 April 2025	DF	—	(Malaysia) Azrin Afiq	25	(Malaysia) Negeri Sembilan	Loan return	N/A	N/A
30 April 2025	MF	—	(Myanmar) Hein Htet Aung	23	(Malaysia) Negeri Sembilan	Loan return	N/A	N/A
5 January 2026	DF	21	(Singapore) Safuwan Baharudin	34	(Singapore) Lion City Sailors	Loan return	N/A	
5 January 2026	MF	24	(Ghana) Alex Agyarkwa	25	(Malaysia) Negeri Sembilan	Loan return	N/A	
Reserve team						Loan return		
30 April 2025	MF	28	(Malaysia) Muhammad Khalil	20	(Thailand) Nakhon Pathom United	Loan return	N/A	
30 April 2025	GK	66	(Malaysia) Syahmi Adib Haikal	22	(Malaysia) Negeri Sembilan	Loan return	N/A	N/A

=== Transfers in ===
Date	Pos.	No.	Player	Age	From	Type	Fee	Ref.
First team
22 June 2025	MF	37	(Thailand) Picha Autra	29	(Thailand) Muangthong United	Contract expired	Free transfer	
30 June 2025	FW	91	(Brazil) Chrigor	24	(Thailand) Buriram United	Transfer	Undisclosed	
2 July 2025	FW	48	(Afghanistan) Omid Musawi	24	(Malaysia) Selangor U-23	Promoted	N/A	
3 July 2025	FW	9	(Brazil) Willian Lira	31	(United Arab Emirates) Hatta	Contract expired	Free transfer	
22 July 2025	MF	40	(England) Zach Clough	30	(Australia) Adelaide United	Transfer	Undisclosed	
22 July 2025	DF	93	(Malaysia) Fazly Mazlan	31	Unattached	Free agent	Free transfer	
27 July 2025	DF	5	(Thailand) Kevin Deeromram	27	(Thailand) Port	Contract expired	Free transfer	
6 November 2025	MF	17	(Kosovo) Toni Domgjoni	27	Unattached (Note: Most recently played for FC Koper.)	Free agent	Free transfer	
6 November 2025	DF	66	(Senegal) Mamadou Diarra	27	Unattached (Note: Most recently played for Grenoble.)	Free agent	Free transfer	
7 January 2026	MF	96	(France) Mahamé Siby	29	(Sweden) Malmö FF	Contract expired	Free transfer	
31 January 2026	FW	98	(Brazil) Vitor Pernambuco	27	Unattached (Note: Most recently played for Ponte Preta.)	Free agent	Free transfer	
3 February 2026 (Note: Already signed before the second transfer window deadline.)	MF	19	(South Korea) Jeon Seung-min	25	Unattached (Note: Most recently played for Busan IPark.)	Free agent	Free transfer	
Reserve team
6 July 2025	DF	22	(Malaysia) Moses Raj	19	(Malaysia) Perak	Contract expired	Free transfer	

=== Transfers out ===
Date	Pos.	No.	Player	Age	To	Type	Fee	Ref.
First team
30 April 2025	GK	1	(Malaysia) Khairulazhan Khalid	35	(Malaysia) Penang	Contract expired	Free transfer	
22 May 2025	FW	9	(Chile) Ronnie Fernández	34	(Chile) Palestino	Contract termination (Note: Players become free agent after contract termination by mutual consent.)	Free transfer	
23 May 2025	FW	90	(Jordan) Ali Olwan	25	(Iraq) Al-Karma SC	Contract expired	Free transfer	
28 May 2025	DF	18	(Malaysia) Khuzaimi Piee	31	(Malaysia) Negeri Sembilan	Contract expired	Free transfer	
5 June 2025	MF	16	(Venezuela) Yohandry Orozco	34	(Venezuela) Carabobo	Contract expired	Free transfer	
9 June 2025	MF	25	(Croatia) Nikola Jambor	29	(Kazakhstan) Altai (Note: Joined FC Altai on 20 February 2026.)	Contract expired	Free transfer	
12 June 2025	FW	17	(Malaysia) Danial Asri	21	(Malaysia) Kuching City	Contract expired	Free transfer	
23 June 2025	DF	—	(Malaysia) Azrin Afiq	23	(Malaysia) Negeri Sembilan	Contract expired	Free transfer	
29 June 2025	DF	19	(Malaysia) V. Ruventhiran	23	(Philippines) Aguilas–UMak	Contract expired	Free transfer	
30 June 2025	DF	22	(Malaysia) Fazly Mazlan	31	Free agent	Contract expired	Free transfer	
24 July 2025	MF	—	(Myanmar) Hein Htet Aung	23	(Myanmar) Yangon United	Contract expired	Free transfer	
26 November 2025	MF	17	(Kosovo) Toni Domgjoni	27	(Kosovo) Ballkani (Note: Joined FC Ballkani on 3 February 2026.)	Contract termination	Free transfer	
15 December 2025	DF	5	(Thailand) Kevin Deeromram	28	(Thailand) Ratchaburi	Contract termination	Free transfer	
18 December 2025	FW	9	(Brazil) Willian Lira	32	(Brazil) Retrô	Contract termination	Free transfer	
2 January 2026	MF	40	(England) Zach Clough	30	(Australia) Newcastle Jets	Contract termination	Free transfer	
Reserve team
23 June 2025	GK	66	(Malaysia) Syahmi Adib Haikal	22	(Malaysia) Negeri Sembilan	Contract expired	Free transfer	
24 June 2025	MF	71	(Malaysia) Haiqal Haqeemi	21	(Malaysia) Negeri Sembilan	Contract expired	Free transfer	
28 July 2025	DF	29	(Malaysia) Faiz Amer	22	(Malaysia) Klang City Sailors	Contract expired	Free transfer	

=== Loans in ===
Date	Pos.	No.	Player	Age	Loaned from	Type	On loan until	Fee	Ref.
First team
20 January 2026	MF	9	(France) Hugo Boumous	30	(India) Odisha	Loan	End of season	Undisclosed	
30 January 2026	FW	17	(South Korea) Kim Ji-ho	23	(South Korea) Suwon Samsung Bluewings	Loan	End of season	Undisclosed	

=== Loans out ===
Date	Pos.	No.	Player	Age	Loaned to	Type	On loan until	Fee	Ref.
First team
6 July 2025	DF	21	(Singapore) Safuwan Baharudin	33	(Singapore) Lion City Sailors	Loan	31 December 2025	None	
15 July 2025	MF	24	(Ghana) Alex Agyarkwa	24	(Malaysia) Negeri Sembilan	Loan	31 December 2025	None	
17 January 2026	MF	37	(Thailand) Picha Autra	30	(Thailand) True Bangkok United	Loan	30 June 2026	None	
29 January 2026	GK	23	(Malaysia) Samuel Somerville	31	(Malaysia) Melaka	Loan	30 June 2026	None	
5 February 2026	FW	48	(Afghanistan) Omid Musawi	25	(Malaysia) Penang	Loan	30 June 2026	None	

== Pre-season and friendlies ==
Selangor announced they would be touring Thailand for five pre-season friendlies. Selangor also confirmed they would play Asia Warriors in MBPJ after the Thailand tour.

9 July 2025 Friendly	Ratchaburi (Thailand)	1–0	(Malaysia) Selangor	Ratchaburi
18:00 UTC+7	Tana 18'	Report		Stadium: Dragon Solar Park

11 July 2025 Friendly	Chonburi (Thailand)	2–1	(Malaysia) Selangor	Mueang Chonburi, Chonburi
16:00 UTC+7	Adisak (?); Tontawan (?)	Report	Lira (?)	Stadium: Chonburi Stadium
Note: The match was played behind-closed-doors.

14 July 2025 Friendly	Bangkok (Thailand)	1–3	(Malaysia) Selangor	Thung Khru, Bangkok
16:30 UTC+7	Lima 10'	Report	Lira 15'; Faisal 20'; Harry 88'	Stadium: Chalerm Phrakiat Bang Mod Stadium
Note: The match was played behind-closed-doors.

15 July 2025 Friendly	Kasetsart (Thailand)	1–1	(Malaysia) Selangor	Bang Phli, Samut Prakan
18:30 UTC+7	Mikuni (?)	Report	Chrigor	Stadium: Windmill Training Center
Note: The match was played behind-closed-doors.

17 July 2025 Friendly	Burapha United (Thailand)	0–1	(Malaysia) Selangor	Chonburi
16:30 UTC+7		Report	Harry 90+3'	Stadium: Banbueng Municipal Stadium

27 July 2025 Friendly	Selangor (Malaysia)	0–0	Asia Warriors	Petaling Jaya
18:40 UTC+8		Report		Stadium: MBPJ Stadium; Referee: Sufi Rozan

== Competitions ==
=== Overview ===
Competition	First match	Last match	Starting round	Final position	Record							
Competition	First match	Last match	Starting round	Final position	Pld	W	D	L	GF	GA	GD	Win %
Super League (Note: Includes the Charity Shield.)	8 August 2025	17 May 2026	Matchday 1	3rd	24	16	4	4	59	20	+39	66.67
FA Cup	16 August 2025	30 November 2025	Round of 16	Semi-finals	6	3	2	1	23	9	+14	50.00
Malaysia Cup	19 January 2026	18 April 2026	Round of 16	Semi-finals	6	4	1	1	12	4	+8	66.67
AFC Champions League Two	18 September 2025	10 December 2025	Group stage	Group stage (4th)	6	0	1	5	7	15	−8	0.00
ASEAN Club Championship	20 August 2025	27 May 2026	Group stage	Runners-up	9	4	3	2	14	9	+5	44.44
Total					51	27	11	13	115	57	+58	52.94

Last updated: 27 May 2026
Source: Soccerway

=== Charity Shield ===
Selangor entered the Charity Shield for the second time in a row, following their runners-up finish in the 2024–25 Super League; they faced Johor Darul Ta'zim, the domestic treble winners last season. That match was also the first game in the league for both teams.

8 August 2025	Johor Darul Ta'zim	3–0	Selangor	Iskandar Puteri
21:00 UTC+08:00	Jairo 2'; Park (yellow card) 20'; Israfilov 64'; Arif 73'	Report (1); Report (2)	Faisal (yellow card) 17'	Stadium: Sultan Ibrahim Stadium; Attendance: 32,777; Referee: Nazmi Nasaruddin

=== Super League ===
==== Table ====
Pos	Team	Pld	W	D	L	GF	GA	GD	Pts	Qualification or relegation
1	Johor Darul Ta'zim (C)	24	23	1	0	117	10	+107	70	Qualification for the AFC Champions League Elite league stage & ASEAN Club Championship group stage
2	Kuching City	24	16	5	3	45	14	+31	53	Qualification for the AFC Champions League Two group stage & ASEAN Club Championship group stage (Note: Since the winners of the 2025 Malaysia FA Cup, Johor Darul Ta'zim, had already qualified for the Champions League Elite via league position, the Champions League Two spot was passed to the second-placed team.)
3	Selangor	24	16	4	4	59	20	+39	52	
4	Kuala Lumpur City	24	12	7	5	40	29	+11	43	
5	Terengganu	24	10	6	8	39	34	+5	36	

Updated to match(es) played on 17 May 2026. Source: Malaysian Football League
Rules for classification: 1) Points; 2) Goal difference; 3) Number of goals scored.
(C) Champions

==== Results summary ====
Overall								Home						Away					
Pld	W	D	L	GF	GA	GD	Pts	W	D	L	GF	GA	GD	W	D	L	GF	GA	GD
24	16	4	4	59	20	+39	52	9	2	1	30	5	+25	7	2	3	29	15	+14

Source: Super League fixtures and results

==== Results by matchday ====
Round	1	2	3	4	5	6	7	8	9	10	11	12	13	14	15	16	17	18	19	20	21	22	23	24
Ground	A	H	A	H	A	A	H	A	H	A	A	H	H	A	H	A	H	A	H	A	H	A	H	H
Result	L	W	L	W	L	W	D	W	W	W	W	W	L	W	W	D	W	D	W	W	D	W	W	W
Position	12	5	7	4	5	5	7	5	4	4	4	3	4	4	2	2	2	2	2	2	3	2	2	3

Source: Super League fixtures and results
A = Away; H = Home; W = Win; D = Draw; L = Loss; C = Cancelled

==== Matches ====
The league fixtures were announced on 9 July 2025.

Win Draw Loss

8 August 2025 1	Johor Darul Ta'zim	3–0	Selangor	Iskandar Puteri
21:00 UTC+08:00	Jairo 2'; Park (yellow card) 20'; Israfilov 64'; Arif 73'	Report (1); Report (2)	Faisal (yellow card) 17'	Stadium: Sultan Ibrahim Stadium; Attendance: 32,777; Referee: Nazmi Nasaruddin

12 August 2025 2	Selangor	3–0	(Brunei) DPMM	Petaling Jaya
21:00 UTC+08:00	Deeromram 5', 36'; Chrigor 67'	Report (1); Report (2)		Stadium: MBPJ Stadium; Attendance: 4,260; Referee: Ahmad Zuhadi Dzulkifli

24 August 2025 3	Negeri Sembilan	2–1	Selangor	Paroi
21:00 UTC+08:00	Anwar (yellow card) 3'; Tsuneyasu 83', 90+3'	Report (2)	Ankrah 13'; Harith (yellow card) 33'; Lira (yellow card) 77'; Kalamullah (yellow card) 81'	Stadium: Tuanku Abdul Rahman Stadium; Attendance: 25,550; Referee: Tuan Mohd Yaasin

27 August 2025 4	Selangor	5–2	Terengganu	Petaling Jaya
20:15 UTC+08:00	Chrigor 17', 36', 45+1'; Fortes 25'; Fazly (yellow card) 90+1'; Izwan 90+6'	Report (1); Report (2)	G. Silva 70' (pen.); Junior 82'; Safwan (yellow card) 90+2'	Stadium: MBPJ Stadium; Attendance: 6,055; Referee: Ahmad Zuhadi Dzulkifli

21 September 2025 5	Kuching City	1–0	Selangor	Kuching
16:45 UTC+08:00	Amier (yellow card) 44'; Ramadhan 68'; João Pedro (yellow card) 90+4'	Report (2)		Stadium: Sarawak State Stadium; Attendance: 5,654; Referee: Tuan Mohd Yaasin

5 October 2025 6	Immigration	1–3	Selangor	Batu Kawan
17:00 UTC+08:00	Eduardo 66'; Ornchaiyaphum (yellow card) 90+4'	Report (1); Report (2)	Fortes 56'; Chrigor 67'; Faisal 70'; Harith (yellow card) 79'; Izhan (yellow card) 90'	Stadium: Penang State Stadium; Attendance: 784; Referee: Shukor Zulkiflee

26 October 2025 7	Selangor	0–0	Kuala Lumpur City	Petaling Jaya
20:15 UTC+08:00	Fazly (yellow card) 45'	Report (1); Report (2)	Lytvyn (yellow card) 26'; Syamer (yellow card) 61'	Stadium: MBPJ Stadium; Attendance: 5,079; Referee: Hasrol Amir

1 November 2025 8	Sabah	1–2	Selangor	Kota Kinabalu
19:30 UTC+08:00	Tierney 9' (yellow card) 35'; Mujagić (yellow card) 90+8'	Report (1); Report (2)	Fortes 44'; Faisal 59'; Syahir (yellow card) 86'; Abualnadi (yellow card) 90+9'	Stadium: Likas Stadium; Attendance: 5,154; Referee: Ahmad Zuhadi Dzulkifli

22 November 2025 9	Selangor	2–0	Kelantan The Real Warriors	Petaling Jaya
21:00 UTC+08:00	Fortes 21'; Fazly (yellow card) 48'; Chrigor 55'	Report (1); Report (2)	A. Sesay (red card) 60'	Stadium: MBPJ Stadium; Attendance: 4,237; Referee: Abang Azharudin Abdullah

7 December 2025 (Note: The match was originally scheduled for 6 December 2025.) 10	Penang	1–5	Selangor	George Town
21:00 UTC+08:00	Tchétché 45+19' (yellow card) 90+2'	Report (1); Report (2)	Faisal 26'; Picha 45+5'; Cheng (yellow card) 45+10'; Chrigor 45+12', 59', 75'	Stadium: City Stadium; Attendance: 2,000; Referee: Khairulsyahmi Ahmad Khalidi
Note: Amendments are made at the request of the home team and are mutually agreed upon by both teams.

23 December 2025 11	PDRM	1–3	Selangor	Selayang
21:00 UTC+08:00	Elisha (yellow card) 34'; Fakhrul 53'	Report (1); Report (2)	Chrigor 21', 49'; Noor 67'	Stadium: Selayang Stadium; Attendance: TBC; Referee: Kamil Zakaria

28 December 2025 12	Selangor	3–0	Melaka	Petaling Jaya
20:15 UTC+08:00	Noor 2'; Fortes 10'; Chrigor 13'	Report (1); Report (2)	Nizaruddin (yellow card) 34'	Stadium: MBPJ Stadium; Attendance: 3,065; Referee: Zam Azwan Khan

4 January 2026 13	Selangor	0–2	Johor Darul Ta'zim	Petaling Jaya
20:15 UTC+08:00	Zikri (yellow card) 90+1'	Report (1); Report (2)	Ankrah 7' (o.g.); Hidalgo (yellow card) 40'; Jairo (yellow card) 84'; Arribas (yellow card) 85'; Bérgson 90+2'	Stadium: MBPJ Stadium; Attendance: 8,101; Referee: Nazmi Nasaruddin

10 January 2026 14	DPMM (Brunei)	2–5	Selangor	Bandar Seri Begawan
20:15 UTC+08:00	Hakeme 42'; Oliveira 62'	Report (1); Report (2)	Chrigor 5', 10', 58', 90+1'; Laine 48'; Mukhairi (yellow card) 78'	Stadium: Hassanal Bolkiah National Stadium; Attendance: 10,200; Referee: Faizudin Ismail

14 January 2026 15	Selangor	1–0	Negeri Sembilan	Petaling Jaya
21:00 UTC+08:00	Syahir (yellow card) 49'; Laine 61'; Chrigor (yellow card) 65'	Report (1); Report (2)	Esso (yellow card) 42'	Stadium: MBPJ Stadium; Attendance: 6,733; Referee: Shukor Zulkiflee

1 February 2026 16	Terengganu	1–1	Selangor	Kuala Nerus
21:00 UTC+08:00	Careca 42' (yellow card) 80'; Panjshanbe (yellow card) 67'	Report (1); Report (2)	Laine (yellow card) 18'; Faisal 57'; Boumous (red card) 74'; Diarra (yellow card) 79'; Chrigor (yellow card) 82'	Stadium: Sultan Mizan Zainal Abidin Stadium; Attendance: TBC; Referee: Kamal Ikhwan Yaacob

22 February 2026 17	Selangor	1–0	Kuching City	Petaling Jaya
22:00 UTC+08:00	Noor (yellow card) 62'; Chrigor 86'	Report (1); Report (2)	Mintah (yellow card) 38'; Okwuosa (yellow card) 82'	Stadium: MBPJ Stadium; Attendance: 3,802; Referee: Nazmi Nasaruddin

28 February 2026 18	Melaka	0–0	Selangor	Krubong
22:00 UTC+08:00	Faiz (yellow card) 42'; Redžović (yellow card) 75'	Report (1); Report (2)		Stadium: Hang Jebat Stadium; Attendance: TBC; Referee: Faizal Talib

8 March 2026 (Note: The match was originally scheduled for 18 March 2026.) 19	Selangor	4–0	Immigration	Petaling Jaya
22:00 UTC+08:00	Chrigor 28', 79'; Cheng (yellow card) 41'; Zikri 45+3'; Pernambuco 90+1'; Syahir (yellow card) 90+2'	Report (1); Report (2)	Rizal (yellow card) 67'	Stadium: MBPJ Stadium; Attendance: TBC; Referee: Usaid Jamal
Note: This amendment was requested by Selangor since the original date was too near to the Eid al-Fitr celebration and the club was not participating in the knockout stages of the AFC Champions League Two.

15 March 2026 20	Kuala Lumpur City	2–3	Selangor	Cheras
22:00 UTC+08:00	Josué (yellow card) 50'; Gomes 72'; Lytvyn (yellow card) 81'; Safawi 85'	Report (1); Report (2)	Noor (yellow card) 3'; Faisal 11'; Cheng (yellow card) 33'; Zikri (yellow card) 48'; Diarra (yellow card) 55' (goal) 60'; Boumous 70'; Harith (yellow card) 80'	Stadium: Kuala Lumpur Stadium; Attendance: TBC; Referee: Tuan Mohd Yaasin

11 April 2026 21	Selangor	1–1	Sabah	Petaling Jaya
21:00 UTC+08:00	Faisal 31'	Report (1); Report (2)	Dinesh (yellow card) 25'; Tierney 34'; Ingham (yellow card) 65'; Dominic (yellow card) 90+3'	Stadium: MBPJ Stadium; Attendance: 3,477; Referee: Faizal Talib

24 April 2026 22	Kelantan The Real Warriors	0–6	Selangor	Kota Bharu
21:00 UTC+08:00	Danial (yellow card) 67'	Report (1); Report (2)	Kim 25'; Chrigor 30' (pen.), 33', 66'; Faris 58' (o.g.); Fortes 64'; Izwan (yellow card) 82'	Stadium: Sultan Muhammad IV Stadium; Attendance: 147; Referee: Kamil Zakaria

2 May 2026 23	Selangor	4–0	Penang	Petaling Jaya
21:00 UTC+08:00	Chrigor 11'; Boumous 15'; Harith 21'; Fortes 62'	Report (1); Report (2)	Arif (yellow card) 31'	Stadium: MBPJ Stadium; Attendance: 4,508; Referee: Afdzal Hilmi

17 May 2026 24	Selangor	6–0	PDRM	Petaling Jaya
20:15 UTC+08:00	Mukhairi 8', 45', 89'; Fortes 27', 29'; Izwan 53'; Fazly (yellow card) 82'	Report (1); Report (2)	Irfan (yellow card) 25'; Elisha (yellow card) 50'	Stadium: MBPJ Stadium; Attendance: 4,350; Referee: Kamal Ikhwan Yaacob

==== Results overview ====
Win Draw Loss Cancelled

Team	Home score	Away score	Double
(Brunei) DPMM	3–0	5–2	8–2
Immigration	4–0	3–1	7–1
Johor Darul Ta'zim	0–2	0–3	0–5
Kelantan The Real Warriors	2–0	6–0	8–0
Kuching City	1–0	0–1	1–1
Kuala Lumpur City	0–0	3–2	3–2
Melaka	3–0	0–0	3–0
Negeri Sembilan	1–0	1–2	2–2
Penang	4–0	5–1	9–1
PDRM	6–0	3–1	9–1
Sabah	1–1	2–1	3–2
Terengganu	5–2	1–1	6–3

=== FA Cup ===
As a Super League side, Selangor entered the competition in the round of 16.

==== Round of 16 ====
16 August 2025 First leg	Malaysian University	1–3	Selangor	Petaling Jaya
17:00 UTC+08:00	Aiman 83'	Report (1); Report (2)	Faisal 4', 44'; Fortes 24'; Mukhairi (yellow card) 27'	Stadium: MBPJ Stadium; Attendance: 1,772; Referee: Firdaus Dahlan

13 September 2025 Second leg	Selangor	9–0 (12–1 agg.)	Malaysian University	Petaling Jaya
20:15 UTC+08:00	Deeromram 12', 48'; Cheng 21'; Chrigor 45+6', 76', 80'; Fortes 55'; Clough 70'; Zikri 90+2'	Report (1); Report (2)		Stadium: MBPJ Stadium; Attendance: 2,392; Referee: Afiq Naim

==== Quarter-finals ====
18 October 2025 First leg	Negeri Sembilan	0–4	Selangor	Paroi
20:30 UTC+08:00	An Sang-su (yellow card) 76'; Esso (yellow card) 86'	Report (1); Report (2)	Faisal 34', 63'; Chrigor (yellow card) 44' (goal) 46'; Clough 56'; Laine (yellow card) 74'; Noor (yellow card) 86'	Stadium: Tuanku Abdul Rahman Stadium; Attendance: 25,550; Referee: Kamil Zakaria

29 October 2025 Second leg	Selangor	2–3 (6–3 agg.)	Negeri Sembilan	Petaling Jaya
21:00 UTC+08:00	Lira 42'; Fazly (yellow card) 73'; Faisal 87'; Kalamullah (yellow card) 90+6'	Report (1); Report (2)	Harith 12'; Javabilaarivin 27'; Sang-su (yellow card) 47'; Tsuneyasu 80'; Zahril (yellow card) 90+2'	Stadium: MBPJ Stadium; Attendance: 7,517; Referee: Ahmad Zuhadi Dzulkifli

==== Semi-finals ====
9 November 2025 First leg	Sabah	2–2	Selangor	Kota Kinabalu
20:15 UTC+08:00	Mujagić 13', 90+1'; Dominic (yellow card) 78'	Report (1); Report (2)	Deeromram (yellow card) 23'; Ankrah (yellow card) 45+2'; Ingham 65' (o.g.); Cheng (yellow card) 77'; Laine 80'	Stadium: Likas Stadium; Attendance: TBC; Referee: Nazmi Nasaruddin

30 November 2025 Second leg	Selangor	3–3 (a.e.t.) (5–5 agg.) (4–5 p)	Sabah	Petaling Jaya
21:00 UTC+08:00	Faisal 33', 73'; Chrigor 51'; Izhan (yellow card) 60'; Fazly (yellow card) 89'; Diarra (red card) 90+4'; Raimi (yellow card) 100'	Report (2)	Ingham 47'; Mujagić 62', 88' (pen.); Gary (yellow card) 90'	Stadium: MBPJ Stadium; Attendance: 0 Referee: Hasrol Amir
	Penalties
	Lira (penalty scored); Noor (penalty scored); Izwan (penalty scored); Mukhairi (penalty scored); Harith (penalty missed); Abualnadi (penalty missed)		(penalty missed) Mujagić; (penalty scored) Lok; (penalty scored) Wilkin; (penalty scored) Ting; (penalty scored) Dinesh; (penalty scored) Ingham
Note: Selangor was punished with playing behind closed doors (without spectators) following incidents involving supporter misconduct during the second leg of the quarter-finals against Negeri Sembilan at the MBPJ Stadium, Petaling Jaya on 29 October.

=== Malaysia Cup ===
==== Knockout stage ====
As a Super League side, Selangor entered the competition in the round of 16.

==== Round of 16 ====
19 January 2026 First leg	Kelantan The Real Warriors	1–2	Selangor	Kota Bharu
21:00 UTC+08:00	Lyngbø 25'; Kang (yellow card) 85'; Azwan (yellow card) 90+2'	Report (1); Report (2)	Mukhairi (yellow card) 13'; Noor (yellow card) 30'; Chrigor (yellow card) 31'; Faisal 61', 90+3'	Stadium: Sultan Muhammad IV Stadium; Attendance: 769; Referee: Shukor Zulkiflee

23 January 2026 Second leg	Selangor	3–0 (5–1 agg.)	Kelantan The Real Warriors	Petaling Jaya
20:15 UTC+08:00	Chrigor 19', 66'; Abualnadi (yellow card) 30'; Faisal 45+3'; Harith (red card) 61'	Report (1); Report (2)	Saravanan (yellow card) 89'	Stadium: MBPJ Stadium; Attendance: 5,100; Referee: Kamil Zakaria

==== Quarter-finals ====
8 February 2026 First leg	Negeri Sembilan	0–1	Selangor	Paroi
21:00 UTC+08:00	Azri (yellow card) 90+6'	Report (1); Report (2)	Zikri (yellow card) 59'; Chrigor 90+7' (pen.)	Stadium: Tuanku Abdul Rahman Stadium; Attendance: 9,637; Referee: Tuan Mohd Yaasin

14 February 2026 Second leg	Selangor	5–1 (6–1 agg.)	Negeri Sembilan	Petaling Jaya
21:00 UTC+08:00	Faisal 2'; Fortes 24'; Laine 30'; Cheng 45+2'; Chrigor 66'; Diarra (yellow card) 84'	Report (1); Report (2)	Kharoub (yellow card) 19'; Aqil (yellow card) 51'; Anwar (yellow card) 65'; Motika 74' (pen.)	Stadium: MBPJ Stadium; Attendance: 10,015; Referee: Ahmad Zuhadi Dzulkifli

==== Semi-finals ====
5 April 2026 First leg	Selangor	1–1	Kuching City	Petaling Jaya
20:15 UTC+08:00	Pernambuco (yellow card) 67'; Chrigor (yellow card) 68' (goal) 90+2'	Report (1); Report (2)	R. Ngah 42' (pen.); Rodney (yellow card) 65'; Okwuosa (yellow card) 67'; Raymond (yellow card) 79'; G. Nistelrooy (yellow card) 83'	Stadium: MBPJ Stadium; Attendance: 7,017; Referee: Izzul Fikri Kamaruzaman

18 April 2026 Second leg	Kuching City	1–0 (2–1 agg.)	Selangor	Kuching
20:15 UTC+08:00	Shitembi 30'; Woods (yellow card) 90+2'	Report (1); Report (2)	Safuwan (red card) 48'; Mukhairi (red card) 63'	Stadium: Sarawak State Stadium; Attendance: 19,855; Referee: Ahmad Zuhadi Dzulkifli

=== AFC Champions League Two ===
==== Group stage ====
The 2025–26 AFC Champions League Two group stage draw took place in InterContinental Kuala Lumpur in Kuala Lumpur, Malaysia on 15 August 2025. The first group matches were played on 18 September 2025.

Win Draw Loss Fixtures

Pos	Team	Pld	W	D	L	GF	GA	GD	Pts	Qualification	PSB	BKU	LCS	SEL
1	(Indonesia) Persib	6	4	1	1	11	6	+5	13	Advance to round of 16	—	1–0	1–1	2–0
2	(Thailand) Bangkok United	6	3	1	2	8	7	+1	10 (Note: Head-to-head points: Bangkok United 6, Lion City Sailors 0.)	Advance to round of 16	0–2	—	1–0	1–1
3	(Singapore) Lion City Sailors	6	3	1	2	10	8	+2	10		3–2	1–2	—	4–2
4	(Malaysia) Selangor	6	0	1	5	7	15	−8	1		2–3	2–4	0–1	—

Source: ACL2
Rules for classification: Tiebreakers
Notes:

18 September 2025 1	Selangor (Malaysia)	2–4	(Thailand) Bangkok United	Petaling Jaya
18:00 UTC+08:00	Chrigor 23'; Harith (red card) 39'; Izwan 73'; Ankrah (yellow card) 87'	Report (1); Report (2)	Alhaft 11', 24'; Al-Ghassani 15'; Maia (yellow card) 45+3' (goal) 84'; Kunori (yellow card) 67'	Stadium: MBPJ Stadium; Attendance: 3,497; Referee: Mooud Bonyadifard (Iran)

1 October 2025 2	Lion City Sailors (Singapore)	4–2	(Malaysia) Selangor	Bishan, Singapore
18:00 UTC+08:00	Anderson 7', 13', 45+4', 54'; Pires (yellow card) 20'; Sušak (yellow card) 35'; Wright (yellow card) 81'; Hariss (yellow card) 86'	Report (1); Report (2)	Chrigor 37' (pen.); Faisal 73'	Stadium: Bishan Stadium; Attendance: 1,745; Referee: Sang-Hyeop Chae (South Korea)

23 October 2025 3	Persib Bandung (Indonesia)	2–0	(Malaysia) Selangor	Bandung, Indonesia
19:15 UTC+07:00	Adam 29'; Jung 66' (pen.)	Report (1); Report (2)	Harith (yellow card) 76'	Stadium: Gelora Bandung Lautan Api Stadium; Attendance: 19,679; Referee: Rustam Lutfullin (Uzbekistan)

6 November 2025 4	Selangor (Malaysia)	2–3	(Indonesia) Persib Bandung	Petaling Jaya
20:15 UTC+08:00	Chrigor 3' (yellow card) 43'; Matricardi 17' (o.g.); Clough (yellow card) 45+4'; Abualnadi (yellow card) 58'; Izhan (yellow card) 80'	Report (1); Report (2)	Jung 48'; Adam 81', 90+7'; Tanque (yellow card) 90+4'	Stadium: MBPJ Stadium; Attendance: 5,505; Referee: Payam Heydari (Iran)

26 November 2025 5	Bangkok United (Thailand)	1–1	(Malaysia) Selangor	Thanyaburi, Thailand
19.15 UTC+7	Nakamura (yellow card) 43'; Poomchantuek 51'; Kosović (yellow card) 85'	Report (1); Report (2)	Musawi (yellow card) 70'; Chrigor 90+4'	Stadium: True BG Stadium; Attendance: 1,091; Referee: Zhang Lei (China)

10 December 2025 6	Selangor (Malaysia)	0–1	(Singapore) Lion City Sailors	Petaling Jaya
20:15 UTC+08:00	Harith (yellow card) 90+3'	Report (1); Report (2)	Ndenge 50'	Stadium: MBPJ Stadium; Attendance: 2,354; Referee: Hiroki Kasahara (Japan)

=== ASEAN Club Championship ===
==== Group stage ====
The group stage draw was held on 4 July 2025. The first group matches were played on 20 August 2025.

Pos	Team	Pld	W	D	L	GF	GA	GD	Pts	Qualification	BRU	SEL	BGP	CAH	BGT	DHC
1	(Thailand) Buriram United	5	2	3	0	14	5	+9	9	Advance to knockout stage	—	1–1	—	1–1	—	6–0
2	(Malaysia) Selangor	5	2	3	0	9	5	+4	9	Advance to knockout stage	—	—	1–1	2–0	4–2	—
3	(Thailand) BG Pathum United	5	2	2	1	9	7	+2	8		2–2	—	—	2–1	—	2–0
4	(Vietnam) Công An Hà Nội	5	2	1	2	9	6	+3	7		—	—	—	—	6–1	1–0
5	(Singapore) Tampines Rovers	5	2	0	3	10	17	−7	6		1–4	—	3–2	—	—	—
6	(Philippines) Dynamic Herb Cebu	5	0	1	4	2	13	−11	1		—	1–1	—	—	1–3	—

Source: ASEAN United FC
Rules for classification: Tiebreakers

Win Draw Loss Fixtures

20 August 2025 1	Buriram United (Thailand)	1–1	(Malaysia) Selangor	Buriram
19.00 UTC+7	Žulj 90+6'	Report (1); Report (2)	Chrigor 38'; Cheng (yellow card) 45+3'; Harith (yellow card) 64'; Kalamullah (yellow card) 90+7'; Deeromram (yellow card) 90+8'; Ankrah (yellow card) 90+10'	Stadium: Chang Arena; Attendance: TBC; Referee: Kim Woo-sung (South Korea)

24 September 2025 2	Selangor (Malaysia)	4–2	(Singapore) Tampines Rovers	Petaling Jaya
21:00 UTC+08:00	Yamashita 18' (o.g.); Clough 30'; Faisal 51'; Fortes 58' (yellow card) 90+6'	Report (1); Report (2)	Kazama 41' (pen.); Higashikawa 65'; Taufik (yellow card) 80'	Stadium: MBPJ Stadium; Attendance: 1,815; Referee: Omar Al-Yaqoubi (Oman)

3 December 2025 3	Dynamic Herb Cebu (Philippines)	1–1	(Malaysia) Selangor	Manila, Philippines
19:00 UTC+8	Andes 47'; Abou Sy (yellow card) 88'	Report (1); Report (2)	Lira 54'	Stadium: Rizal Memorial Stadium; Attendance: TBC; Referee: Ping-Wun Tam (Hong Kong)

28 January 2026 4	Selangor (Malaysia)	2–0	(Vietnam) Công An Hà Nội	Petaling Jaya
21:00 UTC+08:00	Faisal 60', 69'	Report (1); Report (2)		Stadium: MBPJ Stadium; Attendance: 2,574; Referee: Kim Woo-sung (South Korea)

4 February 2026 5	Selangor (Malaysia)	1–1	(Thailand) BG Pathum United	Petaling Jaya
20:30 UTC+08:00	Fortes (red card) 25'; Faisal 36'	Report (1); Report (2)	Ankrah 63' (o.g.)	Stadium: MBPJ Stadium; Attendance: 3,302; Referee: Mohammed Sami Al-Ismail (Saudi Arabia)

==== Knockout phase ====
===== Semi-finals =====
6 May 2026 First leg	Selangor (Malaysia)	2–1	(Vietnam) Nam Định	Petaling Jaya
21:00 UTC+08:00	Zikri (yellow card) 3'; Laine (yellow card) 36'; Chrigor 38', 58'	Report (1); Report (2)	Xuân Son (yellow card) 25'; Wálber (yellow card) 41'; Văn Vĩ 45+1' (yellow card) 78'; Văn Đạt (yellow card) 90+4'	Stadium: MBPJ Stadium; Attendance: 5,733; Referee: Mohammed Sami Al-Ismail (Saudi Arabia)

13 May 2026 Second leg	Nam Định (Vietnam)	0–2 (1–4 agg.)	(Malaysia) Selangor	Ninh Bình
17:30 UTC+07:00	Dijks (yellow card) 38'; Xuân Son (yellow card) 85'	Report (1); Report (2)	Boumous (yellow card) 8'; Chrigor 40' (pen.), 90' (yellow card) 90+1'	Stadium: Thiên Trường Stadium; Attendance: 16,345; Referee: Koji Takasaki (Japan)

===== Final =====
20 May 2026 First leg	Selangor (Malaysia)	0–1	(Thailand) Buriram United	Petaling Jaya
21:00 UTC+08:00	Boumous (yellow card) 35'; Fortes (yellow card) 45+4'; Zikri (yellow card) 54'; Harith (yellow card) 90+4'	Report (1); Report (2)	Theerathon (yellow card) 35'; Suphanat 25' (yellow card) 57'; Supachai (yellow card) 72'; Myeong-seok (yellow card) 80'; Etheridge (yellow card) 86'	Stadium: MBPJ Stadium; Attendance: 8,943; Referee: Rustam Lutfullin (Uzbekistan)

27 May 2026 Second leg	Buriram United (Thailand)	2–1 (3–1 agg.)	(Malaysia) Selangor	Buriram
19:00 UTC+07:00	Suphanat 27' (yellow card) 61'; Žulj (yellow card) 88'; Theerathon 55' (red card) 90+9'; Shinnaphat (yellow card) 90+9'	Report (1); Report (2)	Syahir 18'; Fortes (yellow card) 85'; Boumous (yellow card) 86'; Chrigor (yellow card) 86'	Stadium: Chang Arena; Attendance: 30,889; Referee: Hiroki Kasahara (Japan)

== Statistics ==
=== Squad statistics ===
As of 27 May 2026

Appearances (Apps.) numbers are for appearances in competitive games only including sub appearances.
Red card numbers denote: Numbers in parentheses represent red cards overturned for wrongful dismissal.

No.	Nat.	Player	Pos.	Super League				FA Cup				Malaysia Cup				Champions League Two				ASEAN Club Championship				Total			
No.	Nat.	Player	Pos.	Apps	Goal	Yellow card	Red card	Apps	Goal	Yellow card	Red card	Apps	Goal	Yellow card	Red card	Apps	Goal	Yellow card	Red card	Apps	Goal	Yellow card	Red card	Apps	Goal	Yellow card	Red card
2	(Malaysia)	Quentin Cheng	DF	21		3		4	1	1		4	1			6				9		1		44	2	5	
3	(Jordan)	Mohammad Abualnadi	DF	18		1		2				5		1		6		1		7				38		3	
4	(Ghana)	Richmond Ankrah	DF	15	1			3		1		2				3		1		6		1		29	1	3	
6	(Malaysia)	Nooa Laine	MF	22	2	1		5	1	1		6	1			5				9		1		47	4	3	
7	(Malaysia)	Faisal Halim	FW	23	6	1		6	7			6	4			4	1			9	4			48	22	1	
8	(Jordan)	Noor Al-Rawabdeh	MF	20	2	2		4		1		4		1		5				7				40	2	4	
9	(France)	Hugo Boumous	MF	6	2		1					2								6		3		14	2	3	1
10	(Malaysia)	Mukhairi Ajmal	MF	13	3	1		3		1		4		1	1	2				4				26	3	3	1
11	(Cape Verde)	Alvin Fortes	FW	20	9			5	2			5	1			4				6	1	3	1	40	13	3	1
14	(Malaysia)	Zikri Khalili	DF	17	1	2		4	1			6		1		3				7		2		37	2	5	
17	(South Korea)	Kim Ji-ho	FW	8	1							4								1				13	1		
19	(South Korea)	Jeon Seung-min	MF	1																1				2			
20	(Malaysia)	Azim Al-Amin	GK	1																				1			
21	(Singapore)	Safuwan Baharudin	DF	9								6			1					4				19			1
22	(Malaysia)	Moses Raj	DF					1																1			
24	(Ghana)	Alex Agyarkwa	MF	1								1												2			
28	(Malaysia)	Muhammad Khalil	MF	2				1								1				2				6			
31	(Malaysia)	Sikh Izhan Nazrel	GK	7		1		3		1						2		1		4				16		3	
32	(Malaysia)	Raimi Shamsul	DF	3				3		1						3				1				10		1	
33	(Malaysia)	Kalamullah Al-Hafiz	GK	17		1		2		1		6				4				5		1		34		3	
35	(Malaysia)	Aiman Hakimi	DF					1																1			
39	(Malaysia)	Danish Iskandar	MF	1												1								2			
42	(Malaysia)	Harry Danish	MF	4				4								1				2				11			
43	(Malaysia)	Syahir Bashah	MF	17		3		4				6								4	1			31	1	3	
44	(Malaysia)	Sharul Nazeem	DF	5				2								2				2				11			
55	(Malaysia)	Harith Haiqal	DF	16	1	3		5				2			1	3		2	1	8		2		34	1	7	2
66	(Senegal)	Mamadou Diarra	DF	13	1	2		1			1	5		1		3				5				27	1	3	1
76	(Malaysia)	Aliff Izwan	MF	9	2	1		6				3				4	1			5				27	3	1	
77	(Malaysia)	Aliff Haiqal	MF	6				3				2				2				2				15			
91	(Brazil)	Chrigor	FW	23	23	2		5	5	1		5	5	2		6	4	1		9	5	2		48	42	8	
93	(Malaysia)	Fazly Mazlan	DF	10		4		4		2		2				2				3				21		6	
96	(France)	Mahamé Siby	MF	2								1												3			
98	(Brazil)	Vitor Pernambuco	FW	7	1							4		1						3				14	1	1	
Out on loan
23	(Malaysia)	Samuel Somerville	GK					1																1			
37	(Thailand)	Picha Autra	MF	7	1			3								3				1				14	1		
48	(Afghanistan)	Omid Musawi	FW	5				2								4		1		1				12		1	
Player left the club during the season
5	(Thailand)	Kevin Deeromram	DF	7	2			4	2	1						5				2		1		18	4	2	
9	(Brazil)	Willian Lira	FW	8		1		4	1							4				1	1			17	2	1	
17	(Kosovo)	Toni Domgjoni	MF																								
40	(England)	Zach Clough	MF	7				3	2							5		1		2	1			17	3	1	
Own goals					1				1				0				1				1				4		
Totals					59	29	1		23	12	1		12	8	3		7	8	1		14	17	1		115	74	7

=== Goalscorers ===
As of match played 27 May 2026

Includes all competitive matches. The list is sorted alphabetically by surname when total goals are equal.

Rank	Pos.	No.	Player	Super League	FA Cup	Malaysia Cup	Champions League Two	ASEAN Club Championship	Total
1	FW	91	(Brazil) Chrigor	23	5	5	4	5	42
2	FW	7	(Malaysia) Faisal Halim	6	7	4	1	4	22
3	FW	11	(Cape Verde) Alvin Fortes	9	2	1	0	1	13
4	DF	5	(Thailand) Kevin Deeromram†	2	2	0	0	0	4
4	MF	6	(Malaysia) Nooa Laine	2	1	1	0	0	4
6	MF	10	(Malaysia) Mukhairi Ajmal	3	0	0	0	0	3
6	MF	40	(England) Zach Clough†	0	2	0	0	1	3
6	MF	76	(Malaysia) Aliff Izwan	2	0	0	1	0	3
9	DF	2	(Malaysia) Quentin Cheng	0	1	1	0	0	2
9	MF	8	(Jordan) Noor Al-Rawabdeh	2	0	0	0	0	2
9	MF	9	(France) Hugo Boumous	2	0	0	0	0	2
9	FW	9	(Brazil) Willian Lira†	0	1	0	0	1	2
9	DF	14	(Malaysia) Zikri Khalili	1	1	0	0	0	2
14	DF	4	(Ghana) Richmond Ankrah	1	0	0	0	0	1
14	MF	17	(South Korea) Kim Ji-ho	1	0	0	0	0	1
14	MF	37	(Thailand) Picha Autra†	1	0	0	0	0	1
14	MF	43	(Malaysia) Syahir Bashah	0	0	0	0	1	1
14	DF	55	(Malaysia) Harith Haiqal	1	0	0	0	0	1
14	DF	66	(Senegal) Mamadou Diarra	1	0	0	0	0	1
14	FW	98	(Brazil) Vitor Pernambuco	1	0	0	0	0	1
Own goals				1	1	0	1	1	4
Totals				59	23	12	7	14	115

† Player left the club during the season.

=== Top assists ===
Rnk	Pos	No.	Player	Super League	FA Cup	Malaysia Cup	Champions League Two	ASEAN Club Championship	Total
1	FW	7	(Malaysia) Faisal Halim	6	4	1	0	0	11
1	FW	91	(Brazil) Chrigor	2	3	2	1	3	11
3	DF	2	(Malaysia) Quentin Cheng	6	1	0	1	2	10
3	FW	11	(Cape Verde) Alvin Fortes	7	1	1	1	0	10
5	MF	8	(Jordan) Noor Al-Rawabdeh	3	3	0	0	0	6
6	MF	6	(Malaysia) Nooa Laine	3	0	0	0	1	4
6	MF	9	(France) Hugo Boumous	2	0	1	0	1	4
6	DF	14	(Malaysia) Zikri Khalili	2	0	1	0	1	4
9	FW	48	(Afghanistan) Omid Musawi†	1	2	0	0	0	3
9	MF	76	(Malaysia) Aliff Izwan	1	1	0	1	0	3
11	DF	3	(Jordan) Mohammad Abualnadi	1	0	1	0	0	2
11	DF	5	(Thailand) Kevin Deeromram†	0	2	0	0	0	2
11	MF	40	(England) Zach Clough†	0	1	0	0	1	2
11	MF	43	(Malaysia) Syahir Bashah	0	1	1	0	0	2
15	MF	10	(Malaysia) Mukhairi Ajmal	1	0	0	0	0	1
15	MF	17	(South Korea) Kim Ji-ho	1	0	0	0	0	1
15	MF	19	(South Korea) Jeon Seung-min	1	0	0	0	0	1
15	DF	21	(Singapore) Safuwan Baharudin	1	0	0	0	0	1
15	MF	37	(Thailand) Picha Autra†	0	0	0	0	1	1
15	DF	55	(Malaysia) Harith Haiqal	1	0	0	0	0	1
15	DF	66	(Senegal) Mamadou Diarra	1	0	0	0	0	1
TOTALS				40	19	8	4	10	81

† Player left the club during the season.

=== Clean sheets ===
Rnk	No.	Player	Super League	FA Cup	Malaysia Cup	Champions League Two	ASEAN Club Championship	Total
1	33	(Malaysia) Kalamullah Al-Hafiz	7	1	2	0	1	11
2	31	(Malaysia) Sikh Izhan Nazrel	4	1	0	0	1	6
3	20	(Malaysia) Azim Al-Amin	1	0	0	0	0	1
TOTALS			12	2	2	0	2	18

=== Disciplinary record ===
As of match played 27 May 2026

Includes all competitive matches. The list is sorted alphabetically by surname when total cards are equal.

Rank	No.	Pos.	Player	Super League			FA Cup			Malaysia Cup			Champions League Two			ASEAN Club Championship			Total		
Rank	No.	Pos.	Player	Yellow card	(yellow card) (yellow-red card)	Red card	Yellow card	(yellow card) (yellow-red card)	Red card	Yellow card	(yellow card) (yellow-red card)	Red card	Yellow card	(yellow card) (yellow-red card)	Red card	Yellow card	(yellow card) (yellow-red card)	Red card	Yellow card	(yellow card) (yellow-red card)	Red card
1	91	FW	(Brazil) Chrigor	2	-	-	1	-	-	2	-	-	1	-	-	2	-	-	8	-	-
2	55	DF	(Malaysia) Harith Haiqal	3	-	-	-	-	-	-	-	1	2	-	1	2	-	-	7	-	2
3	93	DF	(Malaysia) Fazly Mazlan	4	-	-	2	-	-	-	-	-	-	-	-	-	-	-	6	-	-
4	2	DF	(Malaysia) Quentin Cheng	3	-	-	1	-	-	-	-	-	-	-	-	1	-	-	5	-	-
4	14	DF	(Malaysia) Zikri Khalili	2	-	-	-	-	-	1	-	-	-	-	-	2	-	-	5	-	-
6	8	MF	(Jordan) Noor Al-Rawabdeh	2	-	-	1	-	-	1	-	-	-	-	-	-	-	-	4	-	-
7	3	DF	(Jordan) Mohammad Abualnadi	1	-	-	-	-	-	1	-	-	1	-	-	-	-	-	3	-	-
7	4	DF	(Ghana) Richmond Ankrah	-	-	-	1	-	-	-	-	-	1	-	-	1	-	-	3	-	-
7	6	MF	(Malaysia) Nooa Laine	1	-	-	1	-	-	-	-	-	-	-	-	1	-	-	3	-	-
7	9	FW	(France) Hugo Boumous	-	-	1	-	-	-	-	-	-	-	-	-	3	-	-	3	-	1
7	10	MF	(Malaysia) Mukhairi Ajmal	1	-	-	1	-	-	1	-	1	-	-	-	-	-	-	3	-	1
7	11	FW	(Cape Verde) Alvin Fortes	-	-	-	-	-	-	-	-	-	-	-	-	3	-	1	3	-	1
7	31	GK	(Malaysia) Sikh Izhan Nazrel	1	-	-	1	-	-	-	-	-	1	-	-	-	-	-	3	-	-
7	33	GK	(Malaysia) Kalamullah Al-Hafiz	1	-	-	1	-	-	-	-	-	-	-	-	1	-	-	3	-	-
7	43	MF	(Malaysia) Syahir Bashah	3	-	-	-	-	-	-	-	-	-	-	-	-	-	-	3	-	-
7	66	DF	(Senegal) Mamadou Diarra	2	-	-	-	-	1	1	-	-	-	-	-	-	-	-	3	-	1
17	5	DF	(Thailand) Kevin Deeromram†	-	-	-	1	-	-	-	-	-	-	-	-	1	-	-	2	-	-
18	7	FW	(Malaysia) Faisal Halim	1	-	-	-	-	-	-	-	-	-	-	-	-	-	-	1	-	-
18	9	FW	(Brazil) Willian Lira†	1	-	-	-	-	-	-	-	-	-	-	-	-	-	-	1	-	-
18	21	DF	(Singapore) Safuwan Baharudin	-	-	-	-	-	-	-	-	1	-	-	-	-	-	-	-	-	1
18	32	DF	(Malaysia) Raimi Shamsul	-	-	-	1	-	-	-	-	-	-	-	-	-	-	-	1	-	-
18	40	MF	(England) Zach Clough†	-	-	-	-	-	-	-	-	-	1	-	-	-	-	-	1	-	-
18	48	MF	(Afghanistan) Omid Musawi†	-	-	-	-	-	-	-	-	-	1	-	-	-	-	-	1	-	-
18	76	MF	(Malaysia) Aliff Izwan	1	-	-	-	-	-	-	-	-	-	-	-	-	-	-	1	-	-
18	98	FW	(Brazil) Vitor Pernambuco	-	-	-	-	-	-	1	-	-	-	-	-	-	-	-	1	-	-
Total				29	0	1	12	0	1	8	0	3	8	0	1	17	0	1	74	0	7

† Player left the club during the season.

=== Hat-tricks ===
Player	Against	Result	Date	Competition	Ref
(Brazil) Chrigor	Terengganu (H)	5–2	27 August 2025	Super League	
(Brazil) Chrigor	Malaysian University (H)	9–0	13 September 2025	FA Cup	
(Brazil) Chrigor	Penang (A)	5–1	7 December 2025	Super League	
(Brazil) Chrigor^{4}	DPMM FC (A)	5–2	10 January 2026	Super League	
(Brazil) Chrigor	Kelantan The Real Warriors (A)	6–0	24 April 2026	Super League	
(Malaysia) Mukhairi Ajmal	PDRM (H)	6–0	17 May 2026	Super League	

^{4} Player scored four goals.
