= 2025–26 ASEAN Club Championship knockout stage =

Southeast Asia premier club football tournament

The 2025–26 ASEAN Club Championship knockout stage began on 6 May with the semi-finals and ended on 27 May 2026 with the final. A total of four teams competed in the knockout stage to decide the champions of the 2025–26 ASEAN Club Championship.

== Qualified teams ==
The knockout stage involved the four teams which qualified as winners and runners-up of each of the two groups in the group stage.

Group	Winners	Runners-up
A	(Thailand) Buriram United	(Malaysia) Selangor
B	(Vietnam) Nam Định	(Malaysia) Johor Darul Ta'zim

== Format ==
Both rounds of the knockout stage were played over two legs, with each team playing one leg at home. The team that scored more goals on aggregate over the two legs won the tie. If the aggregate score was level, then 30 minutes of extra time were played (the away goals rule was not applied). If the score was still level at the end of extra time, the winners were decided by a penalty shoot-out.

== Schedule ==
The schedule was as follows.

Round	First leg	Second leg
Semi-finals	6 May 2026	13 May 2026
Final	20 May 2026	27 May 2026

== Bracket ==
Semi-finals
A2	(Malaysia) Selangor	2	2	4
B1	(Vietnam) Nam Định	1	0	1
B2	(Malaysia) Johor Darul Ta'zim	1	2	3
A1	(Thailand) Buriram United (a.e.t.)	3	1	4

Final
A2	(Malaysia) Selangor	0	1	1
A1	(Thailand) Buriram United	1	2	3

== Semi-finals ==
=== Summary ===
The first legs were played on 6 May, and the second legs were played on 13 May 2026.

Team 1	Agg.	Team 2	1st leg	2nd leg
Selangor (Malaysia)	4–1	(Vietnam) Nam Định	2–1	2–0
Johor Darul Ta'zim (Malaysia)	3–4	(Thailand) Buriram United	1–3	2–1 (a.e.t.)

=== Matches ===
6 May 2026
21:00 UTC+8

Selangor (Malaysia)	2–1	(Vietnam) Nam Định
Chrigor 38', 58'	Report	Nguyễn Văn Vĩ 45+1'

Petaling Jaya Stadium, Petaling Jaya
Attendance: 5,733
Referee: Sami Al-Ismail (Saudi Arabia)
13 May 2026
17:30 UTC+7

Nam Định (Vietnam)	0–2	(Malaysia) Selangor
	Report	Chrigor 40' (pen.), 90'

Thiên Trường Stadium, Ninh Bình
Attendance: 16,345
Referee: Koji Takasaki (Japan)

Selangor won 4–1 on aggregate.

6 May 2026
20:00 UTC+8

Johor Darul Ta'zim (Malaysia)	1–3	(Thailand) Buriram United
Aketxe 90+2'	Report	Bissoli 34', 90+4'; Čaušić 45+2'

Sultan Ibrahim Stadium, Johor Bahru
Attendance: 18,944
Referee: Qasim Al-Hatmi (Oman)
13 May 2026
19:00 UTC+7

Buriram United (Thailand)	1–2 (a.e.t.)	(Malaysia) Johor Darul Ta'zim
Schindler 98'	Report	Bérgson 45+9' (pen.); Guilherme 62'

Buriram Stadium, Buriram
Attendance: 28,113
Referee: Kim Woo-sung (South Korea)

Buriram United won 4–3 on aggregate.

== Final ==
Team 1	Agg.	Team 2	1st leg	2nd leg
Selangor (Malaysia)	1–3	(Thailand) Buriram United	0–1	1–2

20 May 2026
21:00 UTC+8

Selangor (Malaysia)	0–1	(Thailand) Buriram United
	Report	Suphanat 25'

Petaling Jaya Stadium, Petaling Jaya
Attendance: 8,943
Referee: Rustam Lutfullin (Uzbekistan)

27 May 2026
19:00 UTC+7

Buriram United (Thailand)	2–1	(Malaysia) Selangor
Suphanat 27'; Theerathon 55'	Report	Bashah 18'

Buriram Stadium, Buriram
Attendance: 30,889
Referee: Hiroki Kasahara (Japan)

Buriram United won 3–1 on aggregate.
