= Kim Ji-ho (footballer) =

South Korean association football player

Personal information
- Full name: Kim Ji-ho
- Date of birth: 28 January 2003 (age 23)
- Place of birth: South Korea
- Height: 1.73 m (5 ft 8 in)
- Position: Left winger

Team information
- Current team: Suwon Samsung Bluewings

Youth career
- –2015: Bluewings Academy
- 2015–2016: Seongnam U12
- 2016–2018: Seongnam U15
- 2018–2019: Seongnam U18
- 2020–2021: Yongin U18
- 2022–2024: Korea University

Senior career*
Years	Team	Apps	(Gls)
2024–	Suwon Samsung Bluewings	20	(4)
2026	→ Selangor (loan)	8	(1)
- * Club domestic league appearances and goals as of 5 June 2026

Kim Ji-ho (Korean: 김지호; born 28 January 2003) is a South Korean footballer who plays as forward for K League 2 club Suwon Samsung Bluewings.

He is known for his pace and relentless work-rate.

== Club career ==
=== Suwon Samsung Bluewings ===
Kim Ji-ho started in a second round Korean FA Cup fixture against Seoul E-Land FC, which also marked Suwon's 500th match played at their new stadium.

==== Selangor (loan) ====
Kim Ji-ho made his club debut in a 1–1 draw against Malaysia Super League side Terengganu. He agreed to the loan due to fierce competition for the winger position back at Suwon Samsung Bluewings. Kim Ji-ho scored his first goal in a 6–0 thrashing against Kelantan The Real Warriors, where he also notched his first assist.

== Club ==
As of 6 June 2026

Club performance			League		Cup		Continental		Total	
Season	Club	League	Apps	Goals	Apps	Goals	Apps	Goals	Apps	Goals
2024	Suwon Samsung Bluewings	K League 2	11	4	—		—		11	4
2025	Suwon Samsung Bluewings	K League 2	9	0	2	0	—		11	0
2025–26	Selangor (loan)	Malaysia Super League	8	1	4	0	1 (Note: Appearances in 2025–26 ASEAN Club Championship)	0	13	1
Career total			28	5	6	0	1	0	35	5
