= Haykal Danish =

Malaysian footballer (born 2005)

Personal information
- Full name: Muhammad Haykal Danish bin Mohd Haizon
- Date of birth: 5 May 2005 (age 21)
- Place of birth: Meru, Klang, Selangor, Malaysia
- Height: 1.65 m (5 ft 5 in)
- Position: Winger

Team information
- Current team: Selangor

Youth career
- 2021–2022: Mokhtar Dahari Academy
- 2023–: Selangor U-23

Senior career*
Years	Team	Apps	(Gls)
2025–	Selangor		

International career
2021–2024	Malaysia U19	8	(3)
2025–	Malaysia U23	1	(0)
- * Club domestic league appearances and goals as of 18:30, 17 July 2025 (UTC)

Muhammad Haykal Danish bin Mohd Haizon (born 5 May 2005) is a Malaysian professional footballer who plays as a winger for Malaysia Super League club Selangor. He has represented Malaysia at youth level.

== Club career ==
=== Selangor ===
Born in Meru, Haykal was a Mokhtar Dahari Academy (AMD) graduate. In June 2022, Haykal was selected to undergo trial training with some football clubs in France and Luxembourg. Later, he joined Selangor reserve team in 2023, carrying out his entire development process in the club's youth sectors.

== International career ==
Haykal began his international career for the Malaysia U-19. He was included in the Malaysia U19 squad for 2022 AFF U-19 Youth Championship and started in four of their six games at the tournament. He scored his first goal in the competition on 13 July 2022, netting the last in a 3–0 win against Vietnam. He then featured in the final as Malaysia won the tournament with a 2–0 win over Laos on 15 July 2022.

On 3 October 2024, Haykal received his first call-up to the senior Malaysia squad for a match against New Zealand.

== Personal life ==
Haykal's older brother, Harry, is also a footballer and a forward. Both played together at the same club, Selangor.

== Honours ==
=== International ===
Malaysia U19

- AFF U-19 Youth Championship : 2022

== Career statistics ==
=== Club ===
As of 17 July 2025

Appearances and goals by club, season and competition
Club	Season	League			Cup (Note: Includes Malaysia FA Cup)		League Cup (Note: Includes Malaysia Cup)		Continental (Note: Includes AFC Champions League Elite and AFC Champions League Two)		Total	
Club	Season	Division	Apps	Goals	Apps	Goals	Apps	Goals	Apps	Goals	Apps	Goals
Selangor	2025–26	Malaysia Super League	0	0	0	0	0	0	0	0	0	0
Selangor	Career total		0	0	0	0	0	0	0	0	0	0
