= Harry Danish =

Malaysian footballer (born 2004)

Personal information
- Full name: Muhammad Harry Danish bin Mohd Haizon
- Date of birth: 29 April 2004 (age 22)
- Place of birth: Meru, Selangor, Malaysia
- Height: 1.65 m (5 ft 5 in)
- Position: Winger

Team information
- Current team: Perak

Youth career
- 2017–2019: Tunku Mahkota Ismail Sports School
- 2020–2021: Mokhtar Dahari Academy
- 2022–: Selangor U-23

Senior career*
Years	Team	Apps	(Gls)
2025–2026	Selangor	4	(0)
2026–	Perak	0	(0)

International career
2017–2019	Malaysia U16	7	(3)
2020–2023	Malaysia U19	0	(0)
2023–	Malaysia U23	0	(0)
- * Club domestic league appearances and goals as of 7 June 2026 (UTC)

Muhammad Harry Danish bin Mohd Haizon (born 29 April 2004) is a Malaysian professional footballer who plays as a winger for Malaysia A1 Semi-Pro League club Perak FA. He has represented Malaysia at youth level.

== Club career ==
=== Selangor ===
Born in Meru, Harry began his career at Tunku Mahkota Ismail Sports School and Mokhtar Dahari Academy (AMD) as a youth, before joining Selangor reserve team on aged 18. He alternated between the first-team and the under-20s in the following years, being named on the bench for the several matches at senior squad, but remaining an unused substitute. On 22 December 2024, Harry made his senior debut as a substitute for Nooa Laine in Selangor's 3–0 home win over Kelantan Darul Naim in the MFL Challenge Cup. On 27 June 2026, Selangor announced that Harry would depart the club following unsuccessful negotiations over a new contract extension.

=== Perak FA ===
On 17 July 2026, Harry signed for Malaysia A1 Semi-Pro League club Perak FA on a free transfer.

== International career ==
=== Youth ===
Harry represented the Malaysia U20s at the 2019 AFF U-15 Championship tournament in Thailand. He made overall appearance at the tournament, scored three goals in seven games, as Malaysia won the tournament.

== Personal life ==
Harry is the oldest brother of Haykal Danish, who also a footballer.

== Honours ==
=== International ===
Malaysia U16

- ASEAN U-16 Boys' Championship : 2019

== Career statistics ==
=== Club ===
As of 27 May 2026

Appearances and goals by club, season and competition
Club	Season	League			Cup (Note: Includes Malaysia FA Cup)		League Cup (Note: Includes Malaysia Cup)		Continental		Other		Total	
Club	Season	Division	Apps	Goals	Apps	Goals	Apps	Goals	Apps	Goals	Apps	Goals	Apps	Goals
Selangor	2024–25	Malaysia Super League	0	0	0	0	0	0	0 (Note: Appearances in AFC Champions League Two)	0	1 (Note: Appearance(s) in MFL Challenge Cup)	0	1	0
Selangor	2025–26	Malaysia Super League	4	0	4	0	0	0	1	0	2 (Note: Appearance(s) in ASEAN Club Championship)	0	11	0
Selangor	Total		4	0	4	0	0	0	1	0	3	0	12	0
Perak FA	2026–27	Malaysia A1 Semi-Pro League	0	0	0	0	0	0	–		–		0	0
Career total			4	0	4	0	0	0	1	0	3	0	12	0
