= Muhammad Khalil (footballer) =

Malaysian footballer (born 2005)

Muhammad Abu Khalil
Personal information
- Full name: Muhammad bin Abu Khalil
- Date of birth: 11 April 2005 (age 21)
- Place of birth: Kuala Pilah, Negeri Sembilan, Malaysia
- Height: 1.77 m (5 ft 10 in)
- Position: Midfielder

Team information
- Current team: Selangor

Youth career
- 2022: Mokhtar Dahari Academy
- 2023–: Selangor U-23

Senior career*
Years	Team	Apps	(Gls)
2023–	Selangor	3	(0)
2024	→ FC Osaka (loan)	0	(0)
2025	→ Nakhon Pathom United (loan)	6	(0)

International career
2024–2025	Malaysia U19	5	(0)
2022–2025	Malaysia U20	6	(0)
2023–	Malaysia U23	11	(1)
- * Club domestic league appearances and goals as of 27 May 2026 (UTC)

Muhammad bin Abu Khalil (born 11 April 2005) is a Malaysian professional footballer who plays as a midfielder for Malaysia Super League club Selangor.

== Club career ==
=== Early career ===
Muhammad begin's football career by spent part of his youth in Mokhtar Dahari Academy (AMD). In June 2022, Muhammad was selected to undergo trial training with some football clubs in France and Luxembourg. Later, he signed with Selangor, being assigned to the reserve side in the MFL Cup.

=== Selangor ===
Muhammad was included in the first team during 2023 season and been at the substitute bench for several matches. He made his professional debut on 14 August 2023, coming on as an 86th-minute substitute during a 4–0 win away against Negeri Sembilan in Super League. On 5 February 2024, he was promoted to the main squad, after spending a year with the under-23s.

==== Loan to FC Osaka ====
On 5 July 2024, Muhammad joined J3 League club FC Osaka on loan for six-month. He ended his loan period with the club without making any appearances and returned to Selangor.

==== Loan to Nakhon Pathom United ====
On 17 January 2025, Muhammad joined Thai League 1 club Nakhon Pathom United on loan for the remainder of the 2024–25 season where he will play alongside countrymen Fergus Tierney. He make his debut for the club on 20 January in a 1–1 draw to Bangkok United.

== International career ==
=== Youth ===
Muhammad has represented Malaysia at all youth level from the under 19-side to the under-23 sides. On 12 April 2024, Muhammad was included in the Malaysia squad for the 2024 AFC U-23 Asian Cup.

=== Senior ===
Muhammad was called up to the Malaysia national team squad for the 2024 ASEAN Championship in December 2024.

== Career statistics ==
=== Club ===
As of 27 May 2026

Appearances and goals by club, season and competition
Club	Season	League			Cup (Note: Includes Malaysia FA Cup, Thai FA Cup)		League Cup (Note: Includes Malaysia Cup, Thai League Cup)		Continental (Note: Includes AFC Champions League Two and ASEAN Club Championship)		Total	
Club	Season	Division	Apps	Goals	Apps	Goals	Apps	Goals	Apps	Goals	Apps	Goals
Selangor	2023	Malaysia Super League	1	0	0	0	0	0	—		1	0
Selangor	2024–25	Malaysia Super League	0	0	1	0	0	0	0	0	1	0
Selangor	2025–26	Malaysia Super League	2	0	1	0	0	0	3	0	6	0
Selangor	Total		3	0	2	0	0	0	3	0	8	0
FC Osaka (loan)	2024	J3 League	0	0	—						0	0
Nakhon Phatom United (loan)	2024–25	Thai League 1	6	0	1	0	1	0	—		8	0
Career total			9	0	3	0	1	0	3	0	16	0

== Honours ==
Malaysia U23

- ASEAN U-23 Championship 4th Place: 2023
