= Toni Domgjoni =

Kosovan footballer (born 1998)

Personal information
- Date of birth: 4 September 1998 (age 28)
- Place of birth: Koprivnica, Croatia
- Height: 1.77 m (5 ft 10 in)
- Position: Midfielder

Team information
- Current team: Ballkani
- Number: 20

Youth career
- 2006–2007: Slaven Belupo
- 2007–2008: Koprivnica
- 2008–2009: Slaven Belupo
- 2009–2016: Zürich

Senior career*
Years	Team	Apps	(Gls)
2016–2018	Zürich II	41	(4)
2018–2021	Zürich	105	(6)
2021–2024	Vitesse	41	(0)
2025	Koper	19	(2)
2025–2026	Selangor	0	(0)
2026–	Ballkani	15	(1)

International career^{‡}
2016	Switzerland U18	2	(0)
2016	Switzerland U19	5	(1)
2019	Switzerland U20	1	(0)
2018–2021	Switzerland U21	17	(0)
2022	Kosovo	4	(1)
- * Club domestic league appearances and goals as of 22 June 2026 ‡ National team caps and goals as of 12 June 2022

Toni Domgjoni (born 4 September 1998) is a professional footballer who plays as a midfielder for Kosovo Superleague club Ballkani. Born in Croatia and raised in Switzerland, he represented the nation where he grew up at youth international levels but in 2021 switched to play for Kosovo national team.

== Club career ==
=== Early career and Zürich ===
Domgjoni at the age of eight started playing football in Slaven Belupo, he during the 2007–08 season was part of Koprivnica, where after the end of the season he returned again to Slaven Belupo until 2009, where he joins the Swiss club Zürich and played with the youth age group, as well as with the U16 and U18 teams. In July 2016, Domgjoni was promoted to the U21 team and on 28 August, he made his debut in a 0–3 away defeat against Old Boys after coming on as a substitute at 46th minute in place of Izer Aliu.

On 11 February 2018, Domgjoni was named as a Zürich's first team substitute for the first time in a Swiss Super League match against St. Gallen. His debut with Zürich came on 17 March against Young Boys after being named in the starting line-up. Fourteen days after debut, Domgjoni scored his first goal for Zürich in his second appearance for the club in a 1–1 away draw over Sion in Swiss Super League.

On 22 May 2018, Zürich decided to offer Domgjoni a professional contract after his good performances and the parties agreed on a three-year contract. Five days later, he played the first match as professional player in the 2017–18 Swiss Cup final against Young Boys after starting the match before being substituted off due to injury in the 46th minute for Sangoné Sarr.

=== Vitesse ===
On 25 May 2021, Domgjoni signed a three-year contract with Eredivisie club Vitesse. On 5 August 2021, he was named as a Vitesse substitute for the first time in a 2021–22 UEFA Europa Conference League third qualifying round against Dundalk. His debut with Vitesse came seven days later in the 2021–22 UEFA Europa Conference League third qualifying round again against Dundalk after coming on as a substitute at 83rd minute in place of Danilho Doekhi. Ten days after debut, Domgjoni made his league debut in a 0–3 home defeat against Willem II after being named in the starting line-up.

== International career ==
=== Youth ===
From 2016, until 2021, Domgjoni has been part of Switzerland at youth international level, respectively has been part of the U18, U19, U20 and U21 teams and he with these teams played 25 matches and scored one goal.

=== Senior ===
On 1 October 2021, the Football Federation of Kosovo announced that Domgjoni had decided to represent their national team and was awaiting permission from FIFA to play for their national team. The same day later, he received a call-up from Kosovo for the 2022 FIFA World Cup qualification matches against Sweden and Georgia, and six days after the call-up, FIFA allows him to play for Kosovo. His debut with Kosovo came on 24 March 2022 in a friendly match against Burkina Faso after being named in the starting line-up and scored his side's fifth goal during a 5–0 home win.

== Personal life ==
Domgjoni was born in Koprivnica, Croatia and raised in Zürich, Switzerland to Kosovan parents from the village Bishtazhin of Gjakova.

== Career statistics ==
=== Club ===
As of 20 March 2022

Appearances and goals by club, season and competition
Club	Season	League			Cup		Continental		Total	
Club	Season	Division	Apps	Goals	Apps	Goals	Apps	Goals	Apps	Goals
Zürich U21	2016–17	Swiss Promotion League	24	2	0	0	—		24	2
Zürich U21	2017–18	Swiss Promotion League	17	2	0	0	—		17	2
Zürich U21	Total		41	4	0	0	—		41	4
Zürich	2017–18	Swiss Super League	12	1	1	0	—		13	1
Zürich	2018–19	Swiss Super League	30	1	4	0	7	1	41	2
Zürich	2019–20	Swiss Super League	31	1	3	0	—		34	1
Zürich	2020–21	Swiss Super League	32	3	1	0	—		33	3
Zürich	Total		105	6	9	0	7	1	121	7
Vitesse	2021–22	Eredivisie	14	0	3	0	5	0	22	0
Career total			160	10	12	0	12	1	184	11

=== International ===
As of match played on 12 June 2022

National team	Year	Apps	Goals
Kosovo
Kosovo	2022	4	1
Total		4	1
