= Zikri Khalili =

Malaysian footballer

Personal information
- Full name: Ahmad Zikri bin Mohd Khalili
- Date of birth: 25 June 2002 (age 24)
- Place of birth: Bandar Tun Razak, Pahang, Malaysia
- Height: 1.74 m (5 ft 9 in)
- Position: Right-back

Team information
- Current team: Selangor
- Number: 14

Youth career
- 2015: Malaysia Pahang Sports School
- 2016: Bukit Jalil Sport School
- 2017–2019: Mokhtar Dahari Academy

Senior career*
Years	Team	Apps	(Gls)
2019–2020	Selangor II	10	(0)
2020–	Selangor	68	(1)

International career^{‡}
2017–2018	Malaysia U16	4	(1)
2018–2020	Malaysia U19	9	(2)
2021–	Malaysia U23	5	(0)
- * Club domestic league appearances and goals as of 27 May 2026 ‡ National team caps and goals as of 28 October 2021

Ahmad Zikri bin Mohd Khalili (Jawi: أحمد زكري بن محمد خليلي, IPA: [ahmad zɪkrɪ bɪn mohd khaɪlɪlɪ]; born 25 June 2002) is a Malaysian professional footballer who plays as a right-back for Malaysia Super League club Selangor.

== Club career ==
=== Early year ===
Zikri was born in Bandar Tun Razak, Pahang. Alongside with his current teammates Sikh Izhan, he also a part of the Malaysia Pahang Sports School and Bukit Jalil Sports School until together make a transfer to Mokhtar Dahari Academy.

=== Selangor ===
Alongside with current teammates Izhan, Zikri moved to Selangor after graduated from AMD. He choose Selangor as the reason for the next destination to develop his talents. He represent academy club Selangor II and involved ten (10) matches for 2020 Malaysia Premier League season.

On 10 October 2020, Zikri make his senior debut and playing 90-minutes against FELDA United at Super League matches. He also involved the match against Melaka United at Malaysia Cup tournament, help the team going through the quarter-finals with a win by 2–1. On 2 December 2020, Selangor confirmed that Zikri would be definitely promoted to senior's first team for the 2021 season.

== International career ==
=== Youth ===
Zikri has represented Malaysia at all youth level from the under 16-side to the under-19 sides. He represent the national team under-16 for the 2018 AFC U-16 Championship that took place in Kuala Lumpur, Malaysia. He played all matches on that tournament, but the squad failed to reach the knockout stage after their being eliminated at the group stage.

Then, he later moved up to represent the under 19s squad for 2018 AFF U-19 Youth Championship in the Vietnam. Zikri almost played all matches at the tournament, including semi-finals and final matches. However, the squad suddenly lost by the hand of Australia in the final by 1–0. After that, he also be a part of the squad under 19s for 2020 AFC U-19 Championship qualification, which he involved three matches at the group stage and help the team to through the final tournament.

== Career statistics ==
=== Club ===
As of 27 May 2026

Appearances and goals by club, season and competition
Club	Season	League			Cup (Note: Includes Malaysia FA Cup)		League Cup (Note: Includes Malaysia Cup)		Continental		Other		Total	
Club	Season	Division	Apps	Goals	Apps	Goals	Apps	Goals	Apps	Goals	Apps	Goals	Apps	Goals
Selangor II	2020	Malaysia Premier League	10	0	0	0	—						10	0
Selangor II	Total		10	0	0	0	0	0	0	0	0	0	10	0
Selangor	2020	Malaysia Super League	1	0	0	0	1	0	—				2	0
Selangor	2021	Malaysia Super League	6	0	0	0	0	0	—				6	0
Selangor	2022	Malaysia Super League	14	0	2	0	4	0	—				20	0
Selangor	2023	Malaysia Super League	12	0	2	0	0	0	—				14	0
Selangor	2024–25	Malaysia Super League	18	0	5	1	2	0	6 (Note: Appearances in AFC Champions League Two)	0	4 (Note: Appearance(s) in MFL Challenge Cup)	0	35	1
Selangor	2025–26	Malaysia Super League	17	1	4	1	6	0	3	0	7 (Note: Appearance(s) in ASEAN Club Championship)	0	37	2
Selangor	Total		68	1	13	2	13	0	9	0	11	0	114	3
Career total			78	1	13	2	13	0	9	0	11	0	124	3

== Honours ==
=== Club ===
Selangor

- Malaysia Cup runner-up: 2022

=== International ===
Malaysia U19

- AFF U-19 Youth Championship runners up: 2019

Malaysia U23

- Merlion Cup Winner: 2023
