= Willian Lira =

Brazilian footballer

Personal information
- Full name: Willian Lira Sousa
- Date of birth: 9 December 1993 (age 32)
- Place of birth: Altamira, Brazil
- Height: 1.85 m (6 ft 1 in)
- Positions: Forward; winger

Team information
- Current team: Uthai Thani
- Number: 99

Youth career
- 2010: Marília
- 2011: Itabuna
- 2012: Grêmio Barueri

Senior career*
Years	Team	Apps	(Gls)
2013	Grêmio Barueri	12	(10)
2014	Santa Rita	12	(10)
2014	Ferroviária		
2015	Campinense	6	(7)
2015	Sampaio Corrêa		
2016	Operário	7	(10)
2017	Salgueiro Clube	8	(5)
2017	→ Barito Putera (loan)	15	(3)
2018	→ São Bernardo (loan)	0	(0)
2018	Salgueiro	11	(5)
2018–2019	Vardar	31	(3)
2019	Destroyers	9	(0)
2020–2021	Retrô Brasil	9	(5)
2020	→ Ferroviário-CE (loan)	18	(11)
2021–2022	Ventforet Kofu	70	(18)
2023	Kedah Darul Aman	14	(8)
2023–2024	Chonburi	30	(15)
2024–2025	Hatta	24	(14)
2025	Selangor	8	(0)
2026	Retrô	5	(0)
2026–	Uthai Thani	0	(0)
- * Club domestic league appearances and goals as of 19:00, 19 December 2025 (UTC)

Willian Lira Sousa (born 9 December 1993) is a Brazilian professional footballer who plays as a forward for Thai League 1 club Uthai Thani.

== Career ==
Lira was born in Altamira.

=== PS Barito Putera ===
Lira joined PS Barito Putera for loan in the 2017 Liga 1. Lira joined as replace Thiago Cunha who playing for Chonburi FC.

=== Ventforet Kofu ===
In 2020, Lira joined J2 club, Ventforet Kofu from 2021 season. On 16 October 2022, he brought his club won 2022 emperor's cup for the first time in history. he left the club in 2022 after two seasons at Kofu.

== Honours ==
Ventforet Kofu

- Emperor's Cup: 2022
