= Jeon Seung-min =

South Korean footballer (born 2000)

Personal information
- Date of birth: 15 December 2000 (age 25)
- Place of birth: South Korea
- Height: 1.74 m (5 ft 9 in)
- Position: Midfielder

Youth career
- –2018: Shingal HS
- 2019: Yong In University

Senior career*
Years	Team	Apps	(Gls)
2020–2022	Seongnam FC	3	(0)
2022	→ Jeonnam Dragons (loan)	34	(3)
2023	Jeonnam Dragons	9	(0)
2023–2025	Busan IPark	13	(0)
2024	→ FC Anyang (loan)	3	(0)
2026	Selangor	1	(0)

International career
2016	South Korea U17	8	(1)
- * Club domestic league appearances and goals as of 27 June 2026

- Jeon Seung-min
- Hangul: 전승민
- RR: Jeon Seungmin
- MR: Chŏn Sŭngmin

Jeon Seung-min (Korean: 전승민; born 15 December 2000) is a South Korean footballer who plays as a midfielder and is currently a free agent.

== Career statistics ==
As of 11 June 2021

Appearances and goals by club, season and competition
Club	Season	League			National cup		Continental		Other		Total	
Club	Season	Division	Apps	Goals	Apps	Goals	Apps	Goals	Apps	Goals	Apps	Goals
Seongnam FC	2020	K League 1	1	0	0	0	—		0	0	1	0
Seongnam FC	2021	K League 1	2	0	0	0	—		0	0	2	0
Career total			3	0	0	0	0	0	0	0	3	0
