= Aliff Izwan =

Malaysian footballer

Personal information
- Full name: Muhammad Aliff Izwan bin Yuslan
- Date of birth: 10 February 2004 (age 22)
- Place of birth: Klang, Selangor, Malaysia
- Height: 1.70 m (5 ft 7 in)
- Position: Attacking midfielder

Team information
- Current team: Selangor
- Number: 76

Youth career
- 2019–2020: Mokhtar Dahari Academy
- 2021–: Selangor III & IV
- 2022–: Selangor II

Senior career*
Years	Team	Apps	(Gls)
2022–	Selangor	29	(6)

International career
2018–2019	Malaysia U16	7	(2)
2020–2022	Malaysia U19	5	(2)
2022–	Malaysia U23	13	(3)
2022–	Malaysia	1	(0)
- * Club domestic league appearances and goals as of June 7, 2026

Muhammad Aliff Izwan bin Yuslan (born 10 February 2004) is a Malaysian professional footballer who plays as an attacking midfielder for the Malaysia Super League club Selangor and the Malaysia national team.

== Club career ==
=== Early career ===
Born in Klang, Aliff just recently started his football career with Genpro at the age of 8, and then he joined Mokhtar Dahari Academy youth system in 2015. In November 2020, he joined the Selangor reserve team.

=== Selangor ===
Aliff settled quickly into Selangor's youth teams, progressing to the under-23 squad despite still being 17. On 11 March 2022, Aliff made his first-team debut for Selangor as a 61st-minute substitute for Mukhairi Ajmal in a 6–0 home FA Cup win over Harini. After being named as an unused substitute for several Super League matches, Aliff made his first-league debut on 10 April, replacing Caion in the 92nd minute of a 4–1 win against Kedah Darul Aman. On 7 June 2023, Aliff scored his first goal for the first team in a 7–1 away win to Kelantan United in the league matches.

== International career ==
Born in Klang, Malaysia to an Indonesian father and Saudi Arabian mother. Aliff can play either Malaysia, Indonesia and Saudi Arabia but he choose his native Malaysia instead.

=== Youth ===
Aliff has represented Malaysia at the under-16 and under-19 levels.

=== Senior ===
On 6 December 2022, Aliff was called up to the Malaysia senior team as part of an initial 41-man squad for their 2022 AFF Championship that month, replacing Faiz Nasir, who was dropped due to health issues. However, he did not make it to the final 23-man squad for the tournament. On 9 December, he made his international debut in a friendly against Cambodia replacing Lee Tuck in the 80th minute.

== Career statistics ==
=== Club ===
As of 27 May 2026

Club	Season	League			Cup (Note: Includes Malaysia FA Cup)		League Cup (Note: Includes Malaysia Cup)		Continental		Other		Total	
Club	Season	Division	Apps	Goals	Apps	Goals	Apps	Goals	Apps	Goals	Apps	Goals	Apps	Goals
Selangor	2022	Malaysia Super League	3	0	2	0	0	0	—				5	0
Selangor	2023	Malaysia Super League	9	2	0	0	1	0	—				10	2
Selangor	2024–25	Malaysia Super League	8	2	2	0	1	0	3 (Note: Appearances in AFC Champions League Two)	0	5 (Note: Appearance(s) in MFL Challenge Cup)	0	19	2
Selangor	2025–26	Malaysia Super League	9	2	6	0	3	0	4	1	5 (Note: Appearance(s) in ASEAN Club Championship)	0	27	3
Selangor	Total		29	6	10	0	5	0	7	1	10	0	61	7
Career total			29	6	10	0	5	0	7	1	10	0	61	7

== Honours ==
Selangor

- Malaysia Super League runner-up: 2023
- MFL Challenge Cup: 2024-25

Malaysia U16

- AFF U-16 Championship: 2019

Malaysia U19

- AFF U-19 Youth Championship: 2022
- International Thanh Niên Newspaper Cup runner-up: 2022

Malaysia U23

- ASEAN U-23 Championship 4th Place: 2023
