= Quentin Cheng =

Malaysian footballer (born 1999)

Personal information
- Full name: Quentin Cheng Jiun Ho
- Date of birth: 20 November 1999 (age 27)
- Place of birth: Sydney, Australia
- Height: 1.88 m (6 ft 2 in)
- Position: Defender

Team information
- Current team: Selangor
- Number: 2

Youth career
- Northern Tigers
- Central Coast Mariners

Senior career*
Years	Team	Apps	(Gls)
2017	North Shore Mariners	2	(0)
2018	CCM Academy	25	(1)
2019	Sutherland Sharks	22	(0)
2020	Selangor II	11	(2)
2021	→ Penang (loan)	22	(0)
2022–	Selangor	86	(3)

International career^{‡}
2019–2022	Malaysia U23	13	(1)
2021–	Malaysia	20	(0)
Medal record
Men's football
Representing Malaysia
FIFA ASEAN Cup
Third place	2026 Indonesia	Team
Merdeka Cup
Runner-up	2023	Team
- * Club domestic league appearances and goals as of 7 June 2026 ‡ National team caps and goals as of 17 November 2026

Quentin Cheng Jiun Ho (Chinese: 张骏和; pinyin: Zhāng Jùnhé, born 20 November 1999) is a professional footballer who plays as a defender for Malaysia Super League club Selangor. Born in Australia, he represents the Malaysia national team.

== Early life ==
He was born to Chinese Malaysian parents in Sydney, Australia. His father, Ken, is from Johor, while his mother, Michelle, is from Perak. The ancestral home of his family is Dabu County, Guangdong, China. His father is a dedicated mathematics teacher at Carlingford High School.

== Club career ==
=== Northern Tigers ===
Cheng started his football career with the Northern Tigers in his younger years.

=== Manly United FC ===
He later moved on to Manly United FC in 2015 before signing with North Shore Mariners in 2016–17.

=== Central Coast Mariners ===
From there, he was selected in the NYL program and made the shift to Central Coast Mariners in the back end of 2017.

=== Sutherland Sharks ===
Following a year playing in the National Youth League, he caught the eye of scouts for Sutherland Sharks and played his 2019 season in Sutherland. This included a victory in the Grand Final of the PS4 U20's NPL 1 Competition. This caught the eye of recruiters in Malaysia, who were aware of his Malaysian heritage and invited him to the U23 Malaysia training camp to train with a squad. This process concluded in his selection for the 2019 Sea Games where he made his first appearance for the team and scored off the bench in the final group stage game.

=== Selangor ===
Selangor flagged their interest and signed him to their reserve team Selangor II for the 2020 season.

=== Loan to Penang ===
Before the 2021 season, he signed for Penang in the Malaysian top flight for a 1-season loan terms.

== International career ==
In 2019, Quentin received his first call-up for the Malaysia under-23 team after being named in the final 20-man squad for the 2019 Southeast Asian Games.

On 23 September 2021, Quentin received his first call-up to the senior national team, for central training and friendly matches against Jordan and Uzbekistan. He debuted for Malaysia in a friendly 4–0 loss to Jordan on 6 October 2021.

== Career statistics ==
=== Club ===
As of match played 27 May 2026

Club	Season	League			Cup (Note: Includes Malaysia FA Cup)		League Cup (Note: Includes Malaysia Cup)		Continental		Other		Total	
Club	Season	Division	Apps	Goals	Apps	Goals	Apps	Goals	Apps	Goals	Apps	Goals	Apps	Goals
Sutherland Sharks	2019	National Premier Leagues	22	0	—								22	0
Selangor II	2020	Malaysia Premier League	11	2	—								11	2
Penang (loan)	2021	Malaysia Super League	22	0	—		1	0	—				23	0
Penang (loan)	Total		55	2	0	0	1	0	0	0	0	0	56	2
Selangor	2022	Malaysia Super League	22	0	4	0	7	0	—				33	0
Selangor	2023	Malaysia Super League	22	0	3	0	4	0	—				29	0
Selangor	2024–25	Malaysia Super League	21	3	6	0	2	0	6 (Note: Appearance(s) in AFC Champions League Two)	1	6 (Note: Appearance(s) in MFL Challenge Cup)	1	41	5
Selangor	2025–26	Malaysia Super League	21	0	4	1	4	1	6	0	9 (Note: Appearance(s) in ASEAN Club Championship)	0	44	2
Selangor	Total		86	3	17	1	17	1	12	1	15	1	147	7
Career total			141	5	17	1	18	1	12	1	15	1	203	9

=== International ===
As of match played 25 March 2025

Appearances and goals by national team and year
National team	Year	Apps	Goals
Malaysia	2021	1	0
Malaysia	2022	4	0
Malaysia	2023	3	0
Malaysia	2024	0	0
Malaysia	2025	0	0
Malaysia	2026	12	0
Total		20	0

== Honours ==
Selangor

- Malaysia Cup runner-up: 2022
- MFL Challenge Cup: 2024–25

Individual

- ASEAN Club Championship: Allstar XI 2025–26
