= Sikh Izhan =

Malaysian footballer

Sikh Izhan Nazrel
Personal information
- Full name: Sikh Izhan Nazrel bin Sikh Azman
- Date of birth: 23 March 2002 (age 24)
- Place of birth: Seberang Jaya, Pulau Pinang, Malaysia.
- Height: 1.83 m (6 ft 0 in)
- Position: Goalkeeper

Team information
- Current team: Selangor
- Number: 31

Youth career
- 2007–2012: Bintang Biru Academy
- 2012–2014: NFDP
- 2015: Malaysia Pahang Sports School
- 2016: Bukit Jalil Sports School
- 2017–2019: NFDP

Senior career*
| Years | Team | Apps | (Gls) |
| 2020 | Selangor II | 31 | (0) |
| 2021– | Selangor | 8 | (0) |
| 2023 | → Negeri Sembilan (loan) | 24 | (0) |
| 2024 | → Penang (loan) | 22 | (0) |

International career^{‡}
| 2015 | Malaysia U13 | | |
| 2015–2018 | Malaysia U16 | | |
| 2019–2021 | Malaysia U19 | | |
| 2021– | Malaysia U23 | 1 | (0) |
| 2023– | Malaysia | 1 | (0) |
- * Club domestic league appearances and goals as of 7 June 2026 (UTC) ‡ National team caps and goals as of 20 June 2023

Sikh Izhan Nazrel bin Sikh Azman (Jawi: الشيخ إيدهان نازريل بن الشيخ أزمان, [ʃheɪkh ɪzhan nazrel bɪn ʃheɪkh azman]; born 23 March 2002) is a Malaysian professional footballer who plays as a goalkeeper for Malaysia Super League club Selangor, and the Malaysia national team.

== Early life ==
Sikh Izhan was born in Seberang Jaya, Penang, Malaysia and is the third child among four siblings.

At the age of five, Sikh Izhan joined Bintang Biru Academy. At the age of ten, he was spotted by while playing in a tournament and invited got him on the Project 2019 team, citing his size. He travel alone by bus from Penang every weekend to train with the team in Bukit Jalil until the age of 12. He was transferred to Malaysia Pahang Sports School at the age of 13 and transferred to the Bukit Jalil Sports School next year. He moved once again at the age of 15 to the Mokhtar Dahari Academy.

Sikh Izhan was part of the national youth squad that won the 2015 Iber Cup in Spain and 2016 SuperMokh Cup. He also was once nominated as the Goalkeeper of the Tournament in the 2016 Elite Cup in France.

== Club career ==
=== Selangor ===
On 26 February 2020, Selangor has announced Sikh Izhan as Selangor II new signing. On 13 August 2021, Sheikh Izhan made his debut for the first-team aged 19. He conceded two goals in an away league match against Kedah Darul Aman as Selangor won 2–4.

==== CF Fuenlabrada trial ====
In November 2021, Spanish Segunda División side CF Fuenlabrada invited Sikh Izhan to attends trials with the club. In the same month, the club stated that they want to extend the trial period. He trained with both the first team and the under-22 squad during the trial session.

==== Negeri Sembilan (loan) ====
On 18 January 2023, Sikh Izhan joined Negeri Sembilan on a season-long loan.

==== Penang (loan) ====
On 22 February 2024, Sikh Izhan joined Penang on loan until the end of the season.

== International career ==
=== Youth ===
Sikh Izhan represented the Malaysian at various youth levels. He was part of the 2018 AFC U-16 Championship squad.

=== Senior ===
Sikh Izhan made his senior international debut in a 10–0 win over Papua New Guinea on 20 June 2023. He was part of the squad to represent Malaysia at the 2023 AFC Asian Cup in Qatar though he doesn't make any single appearance.

== Career statistics ==
=== Club ===
As of match played 27 May 2026

Appearances and goals by club, season and competition
| Club | Season | League | | | Cup | | League Cup | | Continental | | Total | |
| Club | Season | Division | Apps | Goals | Apps | Goals | Apps | Goals | Apps | Goals | Apps | Goals |
|---|---|---|---|---|---|---|---|---|---|---|---|---|
| Selangor II | 2020 | Malaysia Premier League | 4 | 0 | — | | | | | | 4 | 0 |
| Selangor II | 2021 | Malaysia Premier League | 16 | 0 | — | | | | | | 16 | 0 |
| Selangor II | 2022 | Malaysia Premier League | 11 | 0 | — | | | | | | 11 | 0 |
| Selangor II | Total | | 31 | 0 | — | | | | | | 31 | 0 |
| Selangor | 2021 | Malaysia Super League | 1 | 0 | 0 | 0 | 0 | 0 | — | | 1 | 0 |
| Selangor | 2022 | Malaysia Super League | 0 | 0 | 0 | 0 | 0 | 0 | — | | 0 | 0 |
| Selangor | 2025–26 | Malaysia Super League | 7 | 0 | 3 | 0 | 0 | 0 | 6 (Note: Appearance(s) in AFC Champions League Two and ASEAN Club Championship) | 0 | 16 | 0 |
| Selangor | Total | | 8 | 0 | 3 | 0 | 0 | 0 | 6 | 0 | 17 | 0 |
| Negeri Sembilan (loan) | 2023 | Malaysia Super League | 24 | 0 | 2 | 0 | 0 | 0 | — | | 26 | 0 |
| Penang (loan) | 2024–25 | Malaysia Super League | 22 | 0 | 3 | 0 | 2 | 0 | — | | 27 | 0 |
| Career total | | | 85 | 0 | 8 | 0 | 2 | 0 | 6 | 0 | 101 | 0 |

=== International ===
As of match played 20 June 2023

Appearances and goals by national team and year
| National team | Year | Apps | Goals |
|---|---|---|---|
| Malaysia | 2023 | 1 | 0 |
| Total | | 1 | 0 |
