= Syahir Bashah =

Malaysian footballer

Personal information
- Full name: Muhamad Syahir bin Bashah
- Date of birth: 16 September 2001 (age 25)
- Place of birth: Ipoh, Perak, Malaysia
- Height: 1.62 m (5 ft 4 in)
- Positions: Attacking midfielder; winger

Team information
- Current team: Selangor

Youth career
- 2019: PKNP U21
- 2020–2021: Perak U21

Senior career*
Years	Team	Apps	(Gls)
2021	Perak	9	(0)
2021	Perak II	9	(0)
2022–	Selangor	41	(1)

International career^{‡}
2021–2024	Malaysia U23	8	(2)
2026–	Malaysia	2	(1)
Medal record
Men's football
Representing Malaysia
FIFA ASEAN Cup
Third place	2026 Indonesia	Team
- * Club domestic league appearances and goals as of 7 June 2026 ‡ National team caps and goals as of 6 October 2026

Muhamad Syahir bin Bashah (born 16 September 2001) is a Malaysian professional footballer who plays as an attacking midfielder or a winger for Malaysia Super League club Selangor and the Malaysia national team.

== Early life ==
Born and raised in Ipoh, Perak, Syahir attended Sekolah Menengah Kebangsaan Anderson until 2018. In 2019, he signed with the PKNP FC U-21 team, marking the beginning of his football career at youth level.

== Club career ==
=== Perak ===
Born in Ipoh, Perak, he just recently started his professional football career with Perak and was then promoted to the senior team for 15 matches. He made his debut for Perak on 9 May 2021 in a dramatic 2–3 loss against Sri Pahang in the league match.

=== Selangor ===
On 30 December 2021, Syahir joined Selangor, where he signed a contract until the end of the 2022 season. He scored his first professional goal and for the club against Harini at Malaysia FA Cup on 11 March, in an eventual 6–0 victory at home. Later, he scored his first career league goal for the club, in which his side won 2–0 against Penang at home.

== International career ==
=== Youth ===
Syahir was selected by Malaysia under-23 coach Brad Maloney for the 2021 Southeast Asian Games in Vietnam. On 11 May, in the group stage against Laos, he scored a debut national youth goal in an eventual 3–1 win.

=== Senior ===
Syahir was selected to be part of the senior team ahead of the 2026 FIFA ASEAN Cup in Indonesia. He made his international debut on 1 October in the match against Singapore at the Si Jalak Harupat Stadium, where he also scored his first international goal.

== Career statistics ==
=== Club ===
As of 27 May 2026

Club	Season	League			Cup (Note: Includes Malaysia FA Cup)		League Cup (Note: Includes Malaysia Cup)		Continental		Other		Total	
Club	Season	Division	Apps	Goals	Apps	Goals	Apps	Goals	Apps	Goals	Apps	Goals	Apps	Goals
Perak	2021	Malaysia Super League	9	0	0	0	6	0	—				15	0
Perak	Total		9	0	0	0	6	0	0	0	0	0	15	0
Selangor	2022	Malaysia Super League	14	1	3	1	5	0	—				22	2
Selangor	2023	Malaysia Super League	4	0	2	0	0	0	—				6	0
Selangor	2024–25	Malaysia Super League	6	0	4	0	0	0	1 (Note: Appearances in AFC Champions League Two)	0	1 (Note: Appearance(s) in MFL Challenge Cup)	0	12	0
Selangor	2025–26	Malaysia Super League	17	0	4	0	6	0	0	0	4 (Note: Appearance(s) in ASEAN Club Championship)	1	31	1
Selangor	Total		41	1	13	1	11	0	1	0	5	1	71	3
Career total			50	1	13	1	17	0	1	0	5	1	86	3

=== International goals ===
No.	Date	Venue	Opponent	Score	Result	Competition
1.	1 October 2026	Si Jalak Harupat Stadium, Bandung, Indonesia	Singapore	5–0	6–0	2026 FIFA ASEAN Cup

== Honours ==
=== Club ===
Selangor

- Malaysia Cup runner-up: 2022
- Malaysia Super League runner-up: 2023
- MFL Challenge Cup: 2024-25
