= Katsuhito Kinoshi =

Japanese football manager (born 1964)

Katsuhito Kinoshi 喜熨斗 勝史
Personal information
- Full name: Katsuhito Kinoshi
- Date of birth: 6 October 1964 (age 62)
- Place of birth: Nerima, Tokyo, Japan

Managerial career
- Years: Team
- 2003 – 2004: Omiya Ardija (fitness coach)
- 2005 – 2006: Yokohama FC (assistant)
- 2006 – 2008: Yokohama FC (fitness coach)
- 2008 – 2014: Nagoya Grampus (fitness coach)
- 2014 – 2015: Nagoya Grampus (assistant)
- 2015 – 2021: Guangzhou R&F (assistant)
- 2021 – 2024: Serbia (assistant)
- 2024 – 2025: Selangor
- 2026: Tampines Rovers

Katsuhito Kinoshi (喜熨斗 勝史, Kinoshi Katsuhito; born October 6, 1964) is a Japanese professional football manager. He was most recently the head coach of Singapore Premier League club Tampines Rovers.

== Managerial career ==
=== Early career ===
Kinoshi began his coaching career in his native country back in 2003 after being appointed as the fitness coach at Omiya Ardija. Under a year after being appointed at Omiya Ardija, Kinoshi joined Yokohama FC where he took the role as assistant manager and fitness coach until 2008.

=== Nagoya Grampus ===
After that, Kinoshi moved to another J1 League club Nagoya Grampus where he became the club's fitness coach under head-coach Dragan Stojković before being promoted to the role of assistant manager after six years.

=== Guangzhou R&F ===
On 26 August 2015, Kinoshi left Nagoya Grampus to join Chinese Super League club Guangzhou R&F, where he reunited with Stojković and take the role as assistant manager.

=== Serbia ===
Kinoshi enjoyed a further 141 matches in six seasons with the club before he departed and once again started working together with under manager Stojković, with joining the Serbia national team on 3 March 2021. Under their leadership, Serbia won Group 4 of the 2022–23 UEFA Nations League B, defeating Sweden and Norway and earning promotion to 2024–25 UEFA Nations League A, where they now compete against Spain, Denmark, and Switzerland. Another notable achievement was helping Serbia qualify for the 2022 FIFA World Cup in Qatar including games against Brazil, Switzerland, and Cameroon.

=== Selangor ===
On 24 November 2024, Kinoshi was appointed his first ever managerial role with Malaysia Super League club Selangor as head coach. He made his senior coaching debut on 28 November, when he led Selangor in the AFC Champions League Two and had his first defeat 1–2 against Thailand team Muangthong United. Kinoshi also guided the team to win the 2024–25 MFL Challenge Cup in his first season at the club.

The 2025-26 Malaysia Super League began poorly for Selangor, who managed to collect only 6 points from their first 5 matches, including a 2–1 lost to Negeri Sembilan and a 1–0 defeat to Kuching City, both away fixtures. Selangor also endured a disappointing start in the 2025–26 AFC Champions League Two, suffering a 2-4 home defeat to Bangkok United.

Questions began to arise among fans regarding head coach Katsuhito Kinoshi’s frequent use of the 3-4-3 formation since his appointment in November 2024, as many of the matches ended with Selangor conceding late goals or collapsing in the final minutes. This tactical approach, which emphasized wing-back involvement and high pressing, drew criticism for leaving the backline exposed, particularly in late-game scenarios amid issues with squad depth and fixture congestion. Compounding the discontent was Kinoshi's handling of club captain and Singapore international Safuwan Baharudin. Early in his tenure, the coach informed Safuwan that he was not part of the team's future plans, effectively sidelining the experienced defender and club stalwart. This decision led to Safuwan being left out, sparking emotional responses from the player and frustration among fans who viewed it as poor treatment of a key figure and leader. Safuwan eventually departed on loan to Singapore's Lion City Sailors in July 2025 before returning to Selangor later.

Following the team’s poor performances and underwhelming start to the 2025/26 season (sitting fifth in the league after losing three of the opening five matches), Kinoshi was sacked on 26 September 2025. The club relieved him of his duties as first team head coach with immediate effect, thanking him for his efforts while appointing Frenchman Christophe Gamel as interim replacement.

=== Tampines Rovers ===
On 3 April 2026, Singapore Premier League club Tampines Rovers officially announce Kinoshi as the new head coach of the club.

He resigned 12 days later, on the 15 April 2026.

His tenure was not without controversy, as the club was hit by a fine imposed on the club by the Football Association of Singapore (FAS) and an investigation by the Ministry of Manpower (Singapore).

On 7 April, The Straits Times reported that the FAS had fined Tampines Rovers and Tanjong Pagar United $2,000 each after Kinoshi, then an unauthorised individual, entered an official area during Tampines' 3-0 win at Jurong East Stadium on 16 March.

Kinoshi had not yet been formally appointed at the time. He had also been seen giving instructions to players from the stands and participating in training sessions in the months prior. He reportedly did so without a valid work pass, and the club has not disclosed when one was obtained.

The club stated that Kinoshi had volunteered his time to learn about the operations ahead of his appointment, and was granted access on that basis.

== Managerial statistics ==
As of 15 April 2026

Managerial record by team and tenure
Team	Nat.	From	To	Record					Ref.
Team	Nat.	From	To	G	W	D	L	Win %	Ref.
Selangor	(Malaysia)	25 November 2024	26 September 2025	29	19	3	7	65.52	
Tampines Rovers	(Singapore)	3 April 2026	15 April 2026	2	1	0	1	50.00	
Career Total				31	20	3	8	64.52	

== Honours ==
=== Manager ===
Nagoya Grampus Eight

- J.League Division 1: 2010
- Japanese Super Cup: 2011

=== Selangor ===
- Malaysia Challenge Cup: 2024–25
