= Nooa Laine =

Malaysian footballer (born 2002)

Personal information
- Full name: Nooa Hamzah Laine
- Date of birth: 22 November 2002 (age 23)
- Place of birth: Jyväskylä, Finland
- Height: 1.77 m (5 ft 10 in)
- Position: Midfielder

Team information
- Current team: Selangor
- Number: 6

Youth career
- –2019: JJK
- 2019–2020: HJK

Senior career*
Years	Team	Apps	(Gls)
2018	JJK	15	(1)
2019–2020	Klubi 04	23	(4)
2021–2022	SJK II	7	(2)
2021–2024	SJK	64	(3)
2024–	Selangor	42	(2)

International career^{‡}
2017	Finland U15	2	(1)
2017	Finland U16	5	(0)
2018	Finland U17	9	(2)
2022–	Malaysia U23	7	(0)
2023–	Malaysia	24	(0)
Medal record
Men's football
Representing Malaysia
FIFA ASEAN Cup
Third place	2026 Indonesia	Team
Merdeka Cup
Runner-up	2023	Team
Winner	2024	Team
- * Club domestic league appearances and goals as of 7 June 2026 ‡ National team caps and goals as of 6 October 2026

Nooa Hamzah Laine (نووا حمزة لاين, IPA: Malay pronunciation: [nuwaa hamzah la'ɪne]; born 22 November 2002) is a professional footballer who plays as a midfielder for Malaysian Super League club Selangor. Born in Finland, he plays for the Malaysia national team.

== Early life ==
Laine was born in Jyväskylä, Finland, to a Finnish mother and Malaysian father. His father, Faried bin Baharin, is from Kampung Batu Laut, Tanjung Sepat, Selangor, Malaysia. Laine started training when he was six with a summer team in the municipality of Jyväskylä; his parents introduced him to the sport, and he has said he fell in love with football from his first training session.

== Club career ==
=== JJK Jyväskylä ===
Laine started playing football at his hometown club JJK Jyväskylä, where he made his debut in the second-tier Ykkönen at the age of 15 in 2018, scoring one goal in 15 appearances.

=== Klubi 04 ===
In April 2019, Laine then moved to HJK Helsinki reserve team, Klubi 04 for the 2019 season, where he scored four goals in 23 appearances in the third-tier Kakkonen league.

=== SJK Seinäjoki ===
Laine joined the current club first division side SJK Seinäjoki in January 2021, cited the good facility is what attracting him to the club. He was chosen as the man of the match in his debut match against IFK Mariehamn. In July 2022, Laine scored his first European goal against Norwegian club Lillestrøm SK in the UEFA Europa Conference League second qualifying round. Laine became a regular starter for SJK under Spanish coach Joaquín Gómez, playing various roles and positions in midfield. Laine has described Gómez as the most intense coach he has worked with and credited those seasons as the period when he was fully introduced to senior professional football.

Laine signed a new contract with SJK until 2024, with an option for 2025, in February 2023. He is regarded as one of the most promising young players in Finland and one of the key players for SJK under coach Joaquín Gómez.

==== Selangor (loan) ====
On 9 February 2024, Laine joined Malaysia Super League side Selangor on a loan deal until the end of the season. On 19 September 2024, Laine made his AFC Champions League Two debut, starting in a 1–1 draw over Muangthong United.

On 5 November, it was announced that his move to Selangor was made permanent for an undisclosed fee.

== International career ==
=== Youth ===
==== Finland ====
In 2017, Laine played for Finland U15 and Finland U16 team.

Laine was then called up to Finland U17 squad in 2018 where he make his debut on 5 August 2018 in a goalless draw against Denmark U17. Two days later, he provided an assist to Martin Salin and also scoring a goal in a 4–1 win. He scored his second international goal for Finland U17 on 28 January 2019 in a 2–0 win over Moldova U17.

Laine also trained with Malaysia's under-23 team in April 2022, with the goal of competing in the 2022 AFC U-23 Asian Cup. He did not, however, make it into the squad because the citizenship documentation process was still ongoing. On 12 September 2022, the Football Association of Malaysia denied a claim that Laine was supposed to be on the call-up list for the national squad but was cancelled at the last minute. They explained that they had only contacted Laine recently to get an update on the process of documenting his status as a heritage player. He was not on the list for the central training call-up at this time because he was not scheduled to return to Malaysia until October 2022 to complete the process of obtaining documentation.

In November 2022, Laine was selected for the Finland U-21 by the new coach Mika Lehkosuo. He joined the team for a training camp and an internal match in Eerikkilä on 6–8 December. According to Laine, the possibility of representing Malaysia was first raised ahead of the 2022 AFF Championship, but he did not yet hold a Malaysian passport and attended the Finland U-21 camp instead.

=== Senior ===
Malaysia head coach Kim Pan-gon contacted Laine in March 2023 to join the senior squad. On 23 March 2023, Laine made his international debut for the Malaysia national team in a match against Turkmenistan, coming on as a substitute in the second half. Laine has stated that his initial involvement was exploratory and that the decision to commit permanently to representing Malaysia came later.

== Style of play ==
Laine is a versatile midfielder who can play as an attacking midfielder, a central midfielder or a defensive midfielder. He is known for his technical skills, vision, passing range and work rate.

== Career statistics ==
=== Club ===
As of 27 May 2026

Appearances and goals by club, season and competition
Club	Season	League			Cup (Note: Includes Suomen Cup and Malaysia FA Cup)		League cup (Note: Includes Ykköscup, Finnish League Cup and Malaysia Cup)		Continental		Other		Total	
Club	Season	Division	Apps	Goals	Apps	Goals	Apps	Goals	Apps	Goals	Apps	Goals	Apps	Goals
JJK II	2018	Kolmonen	3	0	–		–		–				3	0
JJK	2018	Ykkönen	15	1	0	0	–		–				15	1
Klubi 04	2019	Kakkonen	8	1	0	0	–		–				8	1
Klubi 04	2020	Kakkonen	15	3	3	1	–		–				18	4
Klubi 04	Total		23	4	3	1	–	–	–	–	–	–	26	5
SJK Akatemia	2021	Kakkonen	6	1	6	0	–		–				12	1
SJK Akatemia	2022	Ykkönen	1	1	0	0	3	0	–				4	1
SJK Akatemia	Total		7	2	6	0	3	0	–	–	–	–	16	2
SJK	2021	Veikkausliiga	19	1	0	0	–						19	1
SJK	2022	Veikkausliiga	22	1	1	0	2	0	4 (Note: Appearances in UEFA Europa Conference League)	1	–		29	2
SJK	2023	Veikkausliiga	23	1	2	0	4	0	–				29	1
SJK	Total		64	3	3	0	6	0	4	1	0	0	77	4
Selangor	2024–25	Malaysia Super League	20	0	6	0	2	0	6 (Note: Appearance(s) in AFC Champions League Two)	1	6 (Note: Appearance(s) in MFL Challenge Cup)	0	40	1
Selangor	2025–26	Malaysia Super League	22	2	5	1	6	1	5	0	9 (Note: Appearance(s) in ASEAN Club Championship)	0	47	4
Selangor	Total		42	2	11	1	8	1	11	1	15	0	87	5
Career total			174	12	23	2	17	1	15	2	15	0	224	17

=== International ===
As of match played 25 March 2025

Malaysia
Year	Apps	Goals
2023	4	0
2024	5	0
2025	5	0
2026	10	0
Total	24	0

== Honours ==
Selangor

- Malaysia FA Cup runner-up: 2024
- MFL Challenge Cup: 2024-25

Malaysia

- Merdeka Tournament: 2024; runner-up 2023
- FIFA ASEAN Cup: third place 2026

=== Individual ===
- Malaysia Super League Team of the Season: 2024–25
