= Chrigor =

Brazilian footballer (born 2000)

Personal information
- Full name: Chrigor Flores Moraes
- Date of birth: 13 November 2000 (age 26)
- Place of birth: Cachoeira do Sul, Brazil
- Height: 1.85 m (6 ft 1 in)
- Position: Forward

Team information
- Current team: Selangor
- Number: 91

Youth career
- 2017–2018: Brasil de Pelotas
- 2018–2020: Red Bull Brasil

Senior career*
Years	Team	Apps	(Gls)
2017	Riograndense	2	(0)
2018	Brasil de Pelotas	2	(0)
2020	Red Bull Brasil	12	(4)
2020–2023	Red Bull Bragantino	9	(2)
2021	→ América Mineiro (loan)	5	(0)
2022	→ Novorizontino (loan)	8	(1)
2022	→ Ituano (loan)	17	(0)
2023	→ Inter de Limeira (loan)	12	(0)
2023–2024	Portuguesa	8	(0)
2024–2025	Buriram United	14	(7)
2025	→ PT Prachuap (loan)	13	(10)
2025–	Selangor	25	(27)
- * Club domestic league appearances and goals as of 2 May 2026

Chrigor Flores Moraes (born 13 November 2000), simply known as Chrigor, is a Brazilian footballer who plays as a forward for Malaysia Super League club Selangor.

== Career ==
Born in Cachoeira do Sul, Rio Grande do Sul, Chrigor began his career with Riograndense in the 2017 Campeonato Gaúcho Série B. He subsequently moved to the youth sides of Brasil de Pelotas, and made two first team appearances for the club before moving to the under-20 team of Red Bull Brasil in 2018.

After being regularly used in the RB Brasil squad during the 2020 Campeonato Paulista Série A2 (with the club now being a reserve team of Red Bull Bragantino), Chrigor made his first team – and Série A – debut for Braga on 29 August 2020, starting in a 3–0 away loss to Fortaleza. On 20 July 2021, after being rarely used, he was loaned to fellow top tier side América Mineiro until the end of the year.

After also featuring rarely at América, Chrigor moved to Novorizontino also on loan on 12 January 2022. After being mainly a backup option, he moved to Ituano also in a temporary deal on 8 April.

On 23 November 2022, still owned by Bragantino, Chrigor was announced at Inter de Limeira for the 2023 Campeonato Paulista. The following 30 April, he signed a contract with Portuguesa until the end of 2024.

On 30 June 2025, Chrigor was signed by Malaysian club Selangor FC for the upcoming 2025-26 Malaysia Super League.

On 10 January 2026, Chrigor started and net four goals against DPMM in a 2-5 away win for his side.

== Personal life ==
Chrigor is named after Exaltasamba former singer Chrigor Lisboa.

== Career statistics ==
As of 10 March 2024

Club	Season	League			State League		Cup		Continental		Other		Total	
Club	Season	Division	Apps	Goals	Apps	Goals	Apps	Goals	Apps	Goals	Apps	Goals	Apps	Goals
Riograndense	2017	Gaúcho Série B	—		2 (Note: Appearances in the Campeonato Gaúcho Série B)	0	—		—		—		2	0
Brasil de Pelotas	2018	Série B	0	0	2 (Note: Appearances in the Campeonato Gaúcho)	0	0	0	—		—		2	0
Red Bull Brasil	2020	Paulista A2	—		12 (Note: Appearances in the Campeonato Paulista Série A2)	4	—		—		—		12	4
Red Bull Bragantino	2020	Série A	5	0	0	0	0	0	—		—		5	0
Red Bull Bragantino	2021	Série A	2	1	2 (Note: Appearances in the Campeonato Paulista)	1	1	0	2 (Note: Appearances in the Copa Sudamericana)	0	—		7	2
Red Bull Bragantino	Total		7	1	2	1	1	0	2	0	—		12	2
América Mineiro (loan)	2021	Série A	5	0	—		—		—		—		5	0
Novorizontino (loan)	2022	Série B	0	0	8	1	1	0	—		—		9	1
Ituano (loan)	2022	Série B	17	0	—		—		—		—		17	0
Inter de Limeira (loan)	2023	Série D	0	0	12	0	—		—		—		12	0
Portuguesa	2023	Paulista	—		—		—		—		12 (Note: Appearances in the Copa Paulista)	7	12	7
Portuguesa	2024	Paulista	—		8	0	—		—		—		8	0
Portuguesa	Total		—		8	0	—		—		12	7	20	7
Career total			29	1	46	6	2	0	2	0	12	7	91	14

== Honours ==
=== Individual ===
- ASEAN Club Championship: Allstar XI 2025–26
