= 2022 AFF Championship knockout stage =

Second and final stage of the 2022 AFF Championship

The knockout stage of the 2022 AFF Championship were the second and final stage of the 2022 AFF Championship, following the group stage. It took place from 6 to 16 January 2023. The top two teams from each group (four in total) advanced to the knockout stage to compete in a two-legged single-elimination tournament beginning with the semi-finals followed by the final. Each tie are played on a home-and-away two-legged basis. The away goals rule, extra time and penalty shoot-out are used to decide the winner if necessary.

== Qualified teams ==
The top two highest-placing teams from each of the two groups advanced to the knockout stage.

In Group A, Thailand secured the group top spot with ten points after defeating Cambodia 3–1 in their last match, while Indonesia became the group runners-up with the same points total but a lower goal differential after defeating the Philippines 2–1 in their last match.

Meanwhile, in Group B, Vietnam secured the group top spot with ten points after defeating Myanmar 3–0 in their last match, while Malaysia finished as group runners-up with nine points following a 4–1 win against Singapore.

Group	Winners	Runners-up
A	Thailand	Indonesia
B	Vietnam	Malaysia

== Schedule ==
The schedule of each round was as follows.

Round	First leg dates	Second leg dates
Semi-finals	6–7 January 2023	9–10 January 2023
Final	13 January 2023	16 January 2023

== Format ==
All ties were played over two legs. The team that scored more goals on aggregate over the two legs won the tie. If the aggregate score was level at the end of normal time of the second leg, the team that scored more away goals across both legs advanced. If the away goals were still level, extra time was played (without applying the away goals rule), and if the same number of goals were scored by both teams during extra time, the tie was decided by a penalty shoot-out.

== Bracket ==
Semi-finals
A2	Indonesia	0	0	0
B1	Vietnam	0	2	2
B2	Malaysia	1	0	1
A1	Thailand	0	3	3

Final
B1	Vietnam	2	0	2
A1	Thailand	2	1	3

== Semi-finals ==
The top two sides of each group advanced to the knockout stages consisting of two-legged semi-finals and finals.

Team 1	Agg.	Team 2	1st leg	2nd leg
Indonesia	0–2	Vietnam	0–0	0–2
Malaysia	1–3	Thailand	1–0	0–3

=== First leg ===
==== Indonesia vs Vietnam ====
6 January 2023
16:30 UTC+7

Indonesia	0–0	Vietnam
	Report (AFFMEC); Report (AFF)

Gelora Bung Karno Stadium, Jakarta
Attendance: 49,595
Referee: Omar Al-Yaqoubi (Oman)

Indonesia	Vietnam

GK	22	Nadeo Argawinata
RB	19	Fachruddin Aryanto (c)
CB	13	Rachmat Irianto	(substituted off) 81'
CB	4	Jordi Amat
LB	5	Rizky Ridho
CM	14	Asnawi Mangkualam
CM	23	Marc Klok
CM	12	Pratama Arhan
RF	2	Yakob Sayuri	(substituted off) 90+4'
CF	11	Dendy Sulistyawan	(substituted off) 90+4'
LF	6	Marselino Ferdinan	(substituted off) 90+4'
Substitutions:
MF	15	Ricky Kambuaya	(substituted on) 81'
FW	7	Saddil Ramdani	(substituted on) 90+4'
FW	9	Ilija Spasojević	(substituted on) 90+4'
FW	8	Witan Sulaeman	(substituted on) 90+4'
Manager:
(South Korea) Shin Tae-yong

GK	23	Đặng Văn Lâm
CB	2	Đỗ Duy Mạnh
CB	3	Quế Ngọc Hải
CB	4	Bùi Tiến Dũng
RM	17	Vũ Văn Thanh	(yellow card) 5'	(substituted off) 69'
CM	8	Đỗ Hùng Dũng (c)	(yellow card) 50'	(substituted off) 75'
CM	14	Nguyễn Hoàng Đức
LM	5	Đoàn Văn Hậu
RF	19	Nguyễn Quang Hải
CF	22	Nguyễn Tiến Linh		(substituted off) 69'
LF	20	Phan Văn Đức		(substituted off) 90'
Substitutions:
DF	13	Hồ Tấn Tài		(substituted on) 69'
FW	18	Phạm Tuấn Hải		(substituted on) 69'
MF	11	Nguyễn Tuấn Anh		(substituted on) 75'
FW	9	Nguyễn Văn Toàn		(substituted on) 90'
Manager:
(South Korea) Park Hang-seo

Man of the Match:
Asnawi Mangkualam (Indonesia)

Referee assistant:
Yousef Aref Al Shamari (Qatar)
Faisal Al Shammari (Qatar)
Fourth official:
Sivakorn Pu-Udom (Thailand)

Overall
Statistics	Indonesia	Vietnam
Goals scored	0	0
Total shots	7	3
Shots on target	2	1
Ball possession	44%	56%
Corner kicks	7	4
Fouls committed	10	11
Offsides	4	0
Yellow cards	0	2
Red cards	0	0

==== Malaysia vs Thailand ====
7 January 2023
20:30 UTC+8

Malaysia	1–0	Thailand
Faisal 11'	Report (AFFMEC); Report (AFF)

Bukit Jalil National Stadium, Kuala Lumpur
Attendance: 62,989
Referee: Kim Dae-yong (South Korea)

Malaysia	Thailand

GK	16	Syihan Hazmi
RB	3	Quentin Cheng	(substituted off) 69'
CB	5	Sharul Nazeem	(substituted off) 87'
CB	6	Dominic Tan
LB	4	V. Ruventhiran
CM	18	Brendan Gan
CM	8	Stuart Wilkin
RW	11	Safawi Rasid (c)	(substituted off) 69'
AM	10	Lee Tuck
LW	7	Faisal Halim	(substituted off) 81'
CF	9	Darren Lok	(substituted off) 69'
Substitutions:
FW	19	Ezequiel Agüero	(substituted on) 69'
FW	20	Shamie Iszuan	(substituted on) 69'
FW	22	Haqimi Azim	(substituted on) 69'
MF	17	David Rowley	(substituted on) 81'
DF	12	Fazly Mazlan	(substituted on) 87'
Manager:
(South Korea) Kim Pan-gon

GK	20	Kittipong Phuthawchueak
RB	2	Sasalak Haiprakhon
CB	4	Pansa Hemviboon	(yellow card) 54'	(substituted off) 68'
CB	6	Sarach Yooyen
LB	3	Theerathon Bunmathan (c)
CM	12	Kritsada Kaman
CM	8	Peeradon Chamratsamee		(substituted off) 68'
RW	15	Suphanan Bureerat	(yellow card) 90+5'
AM	17	Ekanit Panya		(substituted off) 86'
LW	11	Bordin Phala		(substituted off) 88'
CF	10	Teerasil Dangda		(substituted off) 82'
Substitutions:
FW	9	Adisak Kraisorn		(substituted on) 68'
DF	16	Jakkapan Praisuwan		(substituted on) 68'
FW	21	Poramet Arjvirai		(substituted on) 82'
MF	22	Channarong Promsrikaew		(substituted on) 86'
FW	13	Jaroensak Wonggorn		(substituted on) 88'
Manager:
(Brazil) Alexandré Pölking

Man of the Match:
V. Ruventhiran (Malaysia)

Referee assistant:
Song Bong-geun (South Korea)
Bang Yi-keol (South Korea)
Fourth official:
Thoriq Alkatiri (Indonesia)

Overall
Statistics	Malaysia	Thailand
Goals scored	1	0
Total shots	5	18
Shots on target	1	4
Ball possession	28%	72%
Corner kicks	2	9
Fouls committed	5	8
Offsides	0	1
Yellow cards	1	2
Red cards	0	0

=== Second leg ===
==== Vietnam vs Indonesia ====
9 January 2023
19:30 UTC+7

Vietnam	2–0	Indonesia
Nguyễn Tiến Linh 3', 47'	Report (AFFMEC); Report (AFF)

Mỹ Đình National Stadium, Hanoi
Attendance: 23,989
Referee: Yusuke Araki (Japan)

Vietnam	Indonesia

GK	23	Đặng Văn Lâm
CB	16	Nguyễn Thành Chung		(substituted off) 71'
CB	3	Quế Ngọc Hải
CB	4	Bùi Tiến Dũng	(yellow card) 24'	(substituted off) 51'
RM	13	Hồ Tấn Tài
CM	8	Đỗ Hùng Dũng (c)
CM	14	Nguyễn Hoàng Đức
LM	5	Đoàn Văn Hậu	(yellow card) 38'
AM	19	Nguyễn Quang Hải		(substituted off) 90+1'
CF	18	Phạm Tuấn Hải
CF	22	Nguyễn Tiến Linh		(substituted off) 71'
Substitutions:
DF	12	Bùi Hoàng Việt Anh		(substituted on) 51'
DF	6	Nguyễn Thanh Bình		(substituted on) 71'
FW	20	Phan Văn Đức		(substituted on) 71'
FW	9	Nguyễn Văn Toàn		(substituted on) 90+1'
Manager:
(South Korea) Park Hang-seo

GK	22	Nadeo Argawinata
CB	19	Fachruddin Aryanto (c)
CB	4	Jordi Amat
CB	5	Rizky Ridho		(substituted off) 78'
CM	14	Asnawi Mangkualam	(yellow card) 36'	(substituted off) 57'
CM	23	Marc Klok
CM	12	Pratama Arhan
RW	2	Yakob Sayuri
AM	6	Marselino Ferdinan		(substituted off) 79'
LW	7	Saddil Ramdani		(substituted off) 57'
CF	11	Dendy Sulistyawan
Substitutions:
FW	8	Witan Sulaeman		(substituted on) 57'
MF	15	Ricky Kambuaya	(yellow card) 74'	(substituted on) 57'
FW	18	Muhammad Rafli		(substituted on) 78'
FW	9	Ilija Spasojević		(substituted on) 79'
Manager:
(South Korea) Shin Tae-yong

Man of the Match:
Nguyễn Tiến Linh (Vietnam)

Referee assistant:
Kota Watanabe (Japan)
Yusuke Hamamoto (Japan)
Fourth official:
Souei Vongkham (Laos)

Overall
Statistics	Vietnam	Indonesia
Goals scored	2	0
Total shots	11	7
Shots on target	5	0
Ball possession	47.5%	52.5%
Corner kicks	5	7
Fouls committed	12	17
Offsides	3	3
Yellow cards	2	2
Red cards	0	0

==== Thailand vs Malaysia ====
10 January 2023
19:30 UTC+7

Thailand	3–0	Malaysia
Teerasil 19'; Bordin 55'; Adisak 71'	Report (AFFMEC); Report (AFF)

Thammasat Stadium, Pathum Thani
Attendance: 18,927
Referee: Adham Makhadmeh (Jordan)

Thailand	Malaysia

GK	1	Kampol Pathomakkakul	(yellow card) 84'
RB	2	Sasalak Haiprakhon
CB	4	Pansa Hemviboon		(substituted off) 85'
CB	6	Sarach Yooyen	(yellow card) 73'	(substituted off) 77'
LB	3	Theerathon Bunmathan (c)
CM	12	Kritsada Kaman
CM	8	Peeradon Chamratsamee
RW	15	Suphanan Bureerat		(substituted off) 85'
AM	17	Ekanit Panya	(yellow card) 65'
LW	11	Bordin Phala		(substituted off) 69'
CF	10	Teerasil Dangda		(substituted off) 46'
Substitutions:
FW	9	Adisak Kraisorn		(substituted on) 46'
MF	18	Weerathep Pomphan		(substituted on) 69'
MF	7	Sumanya Purisai		(substituted on) 77'
DF	16	Jakkapan Praisuwan		(substituted on) 85'
DF	5	Chalermsak Aukkee		(substituted on) 85'
Manager:
(Brazil) Alexandré Pölking

GK	16	Syihan Hazmi
RB	2	Azam Azmi
CB	5	Sharul Nazeem
CB	6	Dominic Tan	(yellow card) 70'
LB	12	Fazly Mazlan		(substituted off) 68'
CM	18	Brendan Gan		(substituted off) 82'
CM	8	Stuart Wilkin		(substituted off) 72'
CM	14	Mukhairi Ajmal		(substituted off) 46'
RF	13	Hakim Hassan		(substituted off) 47'
CF	9	Darren Lok
LF	7	Faisal Halim (c)	(yellow card) 30'
Substitutions:
MF	10	Lee Tuck		(substituted on) 46'
DF	4	V. Ruventhiran		(substituted on) 47'
FW	11	Safawi Rasid	(yellow card) 75'	(substituted on) 68'
FW	19	Ezequiel Agüero	(yellow card) 73'	(substituted on) 72'
FW	22	Haqimi Azim		(substituted on) 82'
Manager:
(South Korea) Kim Pan-gon

Man of the Match:
Adisak Kraisorn (Thailand)

Referee assistant:
Mohammad Mustafa Hassan Alkalaf (Jordan)
Ahmad Moannes Nadi Alroalle (Jordan)
Fourth official:
Xaypaseth Phongsanit (Laos)

Overall
Statistics	Thailand	Malaysia
Goals scored	3	0
Total shots	12	3
Shots on target	7	2
Ball possession	62.9%	37.1%
Corner kicks	1	1
Fouls committed	14	20
Offsides	1	0
Yellow cards	3	4
Red cards	0	0

== Final ==
Team 1	Agg.	Team 2	1st leg	2nd leg
Vietnam	2–3	Thailand	2–2	0–1

=== First leg ===
13 January 2023
19:30 UTC+7

Vietnam	2–2	Thailand
Nguyễn Tiến Linh 24'; Vũ Văn Thanh 88'	Report (AFFMEC); Report (AFF)	Poramet 48'; Sarach 63'

Mỹ Đình National Stadium, Hanoi
Attendance: 38,539
Referee: Ko Hyung-jin (South Korea)

Vietnam	Thailand

GK	23	Đặng Văn Lâm
CB	2	Đỗ Duy Mạnh		(substituted off) 58'
CB	3	Quế Ngọc Hải	(yellow card) 40'
CB	4	Bùi Tiến Dũng		(substituted off) 85'
RM	13	Hồ Tấn Tài		(substituted off) 85'
CM	8	Đỗ Hùng Dũng (c)
CM	14	Nguyễn Hoàng Đức	(yellow card) 52'
LM	5	Đoàn Văn Hậu
AM	19	Nguyễn Quang Hải		(substituted off) 79'
CF	18	Phạm Tuấn Hải		(substituted off) 58'
CF	22	Nguyễn Tiến Linh
Substitutes:
FW	20	Phan Văn Đức		(substituted on) 58'
DF	12	Bùi Hoàng Việt Anh		(substituted on) 58'
FW	10	Nguyễn Văn Quyết		(substituted on) 79'
DF	17	Vũ Văn Thanh		(substituted on) 85'
DF	6	Nguyễn Thanh Bình		(substituted on) 85'
Manager:
(South Korea) Park Hang-seo

GK	1	Kampol Pathomakkakul
CB	12	Kritsada Kaman
CB	4	Pansa Hemviboon
CB	6	Sarach Yooyen		(substituted off) 84'
RWB	15	Suphanan Bureerat
LWB	2	Sasalak Haiprakhon	(yellow card) 69'
DM	18	Weerathep Pomphan
RM	9	Adisak Kraisorn		(substituted off) 74'
CM	8	Peeradon Chamratsamee
LM	3	Theerathon Bunmathan (c)	(yellow card) 80'
CF	21	Poramet Arjvirai		(substituted off) 79'
Substitutes:
MF	17	Ekanit Panya		(substituted on) 74'
FW	11	Bordin Phala		(substituted on) 79'
MF	7	Sumanya Purisai		(substituted on) 84'
Manager:
(Brazil) Alexandré Pölking

Man of the Match:
Theerathon Bunmathan (Thailand)

Referee assistant:
Park Kyun-yong (South Korea)
Kang Dong-ho (South Korea)
Fourth official:
Thoriq Alkatiri (Indonesia)

Overall
Statistics	Vietnam	Thailand
Goals scored	2	2
Total shots	10	6
Shots on target	4	1
Ball possession	53.5%	46.5%
Corner kicks	3	1
Fouls committed	11	7
Offsides	0	3
Yellow cards	2	2
Red cards	0	0

=== Second leg ===
16 January 2023
19:30 UTC+7

Thailand	1–0	Vietnam
Theerathon 24'	Report (AFFMEC); Report (AFF)

Thammasat Stadium, Pathum Thani
Attendance: 19,306
Referee: Jumpei Iida (Japan)

Thailand	Vietnam

GK	1	Kampol Pathomakkakul
CB	12	Kritsada Kaman
CB	4	Pansa Hemviboon
CB	6	Sarach Yooyen		(substituted off) 73'
RWB	15	Suphanan Bureerat	(yellow card) 84'
LWB	2	Sasalak Haiprakhon		(substituted off) 90+1'
DM	18	Weerathep Pomphan		(substituted off) 87'
RM	9	Adisak Kraisorn		(substituted off) 73'
CM	8	Peeradon Chamratsamee	(yellow card) 19' (yellow-red card) 90+5'
LM	3	Theerathon Bunmathan (c)
CF	21	Poramet Arjvirai		(substituted off) 73'
Substitutes:
FW	11	Bordin Phala	(yellow card) 77'	(substituted on) 73'
MF	17	Ekanit Panya		(substituted on) 73'
DF	16	Jakkapan Praisuwan		(substituted on) 73'
MF	7	Sumanya Purisai		(substituted on) 87'
DF	5	Chalermsak Aukkee		(substituted on) 90+1'
Manager:
(Brazil) Alexandré Pölking

GK	23	Đặng Văn Lâm
CB	6	Nguyễn Thanh Bình	(yellow card) 89'
CB	3	Quế Ngọc Hải	(yellow card) 86'
CB	12	Bùi Hoàng Việt Anh		(substituted off) 46'
RWB	17	Vũ Văn Thanh	(yellow card) 29'	(substituted off) 68'
LWB	5	Đoàn Văn Hậu
CM	8	Đỗ Hùng Dũng (c)		(substituted off) 75'
CM	11	Nguyễn Tuấn Anh		(substituted off) 36'
CM	14	Nguyễn Hoàng Đức
SS	20	Phan Văn Đức	(yellow card) 39'	(substituted off) 46'
CF	22	Nguyễn Tiến Linh	(yellow card) 59'
Substitutes:
MF	19	Nguyễn Quang Hải		(substituted on) 36'
DF	2	Đỗ Duy Mạnh		(substituted on) 46'
FW	18	Phạm Tuấn Hải		(substituted on) 46'
DF	16	Nguyễn Thành Chung		(substituted on) 68'
FW	9	Nguyễn Văn Toàn		(substituted on) 75'
Manager:
(South Korea) Park Hang-seo

Man of the Match:
Theerathon Bunmathan (Thailand)

Referee assistant:
Isao Nishihashi (Japan)
Takumi Takagi (Japan)
Fourth official:
Nazmi Nasaruddin (Malaysia)

Overall
Statistics	Thailand	Vietnam
Goals scored	1	0
Total shots	6	9
Shots on target	2	2
Ball possession	50.7%	49.3%
Corner kicks	2	2
Fouls committed	14	15
Offsides	5	0
Yellow cards	2	5
Red cards	1	0
