= 2022 AFF Championship final =

- Event: 2022 AFF Championship
Vietnam	Thailand
(Vietnam)	(Thailand)
2	3
- on aggregate

First leg
Vietnam	Thailand
2	2
- Date: 13 January 2023
- Venue: Mỹ Đình National Stadium, Hanoi
- Referee: Ko Hyung-jin (South Korea)
- Weather: Clear sky

Second leg
Thailand	Vietnam
1	0
- Date: 16 January 2023
- Venue: Thammasat Stadium, Pathum Thani
- Referee: Jumpei Iida (Japan)
- Weather: Clear sky

The 2022 AFF Championship final was the final of the 2022 AFF Championship, the 14th edition of the top-level Southeast Asia football tournament organised by the ASEAN Football Federation (AFF).

The final was contested in two-legged home-and-away format between Vietnam and Thailand. The first leg was hosted by Vietnam at the Mỹ Đình National Stadium in Hanoi on 13 January 2023, while the second leg was hosted by Thailand at the Thammasat Stadium in Pathum Thani on 16 January 2023.

== Background ==
This was the fourth AFF Championship final for Vietnam, having won in 2008 and 2018 finals, but lost in 1998 final.

This was the tenth AFF Championship final for Thailand, having won the 1996, 2000, 2002, 2014, 2016, and 2020 finals, and lost in 2007, 2008, and 2012 finals.

Both were the strongest-ranked AFF teams in the FIFA World Rankings; Vietnam was ranked first in Southeast Asia and 96th overall while Thailand was ranked 2nd in Southeast Asia and ranked 111th. Both teams have the second-highest win percentage in the AFF Championship finals behind Singapore (67% each). Thailand was leading the all-time championship table with six titles to their name while Vietnam, on the other hand, only won two in 2008 and 2018. They had met only in 2008 AFF Championship Final, where Vietnam won 3–2 on aggregate (won 2–1 in the first leg; and drew 1–1 in the second). In all competitions since Vietnam's reintegration, Thailand won 16 meetings, Vietnam won only 3, and 7 matches ended in draws.

This final between the two countries is highly anticipated after 15 years and having won every AFF tournament since 2014.

== Route to the final ==
Vietnam				Round	Thailand			
Opponent	Result			Group stage	Opponent	Result		
Laos	0–6			Matchday 1	Brunei	0–5		
Malaysia	3–0			Matchday 2	Philippines	4–0		
Singapore	0–0			Matchday 3	Indonesia	1–1		
Myanmar	3–0			Matchday 4	Cambodia	3–1		
Group B winners: Pos / Team / Pld / Pts; 1 / Vietnam / 4 / 10; 2 / Malaysia / 4 / 9; 3 / Singapore / 4 / 7; 4 / Myanmar / 4 / 1; 5 / Laos / 4 / 1; Source: AFF				Final standings	Group A winners: Pos / Team / Pld / Pts; 1 / Thailand / 4 / 10; 2 / Indonesia / 4 / 10; 3 / Cambodia / 4 / 6; 4 / Philippines / 4 / 3; 5 / Brunei / 4 / 0; Source: AFF			
Opponent	Agg.	1st leg	2nd leg	Knockout stage	Opponent	Agg.	1st leg	2nd leg
Indonesia	2–0	0–0 (A)	2–0 (H)	Semi-finals	Malaysia	3–1	1–0 (A)	3–0 (H)

== Matches ==
=== First leg ===
13 January 2023
19:30 UTC+7

Vietnam	2–2	Thailand
Nguyễn Tiến Linh 24'; Vũ Văn Thanh 88'	Report (AFFMEC); Report (AFF)	Poramet 48'; Sarach 63'

Mỹ Đình National Stadium, Hanoi
Attendance: 38,539
Referee: Ko Hyung-jin (South Korea)

Vietnam	Thailand

GK	23	Đặng Văn Lâm
CB	2	Đỗ Duy Mạnh		(substituted off) 58'
CB	3	Quế Ngọc Hải	(yellow card) 40'
CB	4	Bùi Tiến Dũng		(substituted off) 85'
RM	13	Hồ Tấn Tài		(substituted off) 85'
CM	8	Đỗ Hùng Dũng (c)
CM	14	Nguyễn Hoàng Đức	(yellow card) 52'
LM	5	Đoàn Văn Hậu
AM	19	Nguyễn Quang Hải		(substituted off) 79'
CF	18	Phạm Tuấn Hải		(substituted off) 58'
CF	22	Nguyễn Tiến Linh
Substitutes:
FW	20	Phan Văn Đức		(substituted on) 58'
DF	12	Bùi Hoàng Việt Anh		(substituted on) 58'
FW	10	Nguyễn Văn Quyết		(substituted on) 79'
DF	17	Vũ Văn Thanh		(substituted on) 85'
DF	6	Nguyễn Thanh Bình		(substituted on) 85'
Manager:
(South Korea) Park Hang-seo

GK	1	Kampol Pathomakkakul
CB	12	Kritsada Kaman
CB	4	Pansa Hemviboon
CB	6	Sarach Yooyen		(substituted off) 84'
RWB	15	Suphanan Bureerat
LWB	2	Sasalak Haiprakhon	(yellow card) 69'
CM	18	Weerathep Pomphan
CM	8	Peeradon Chamratsamee
CM	3	Theerathon Bunmathan (c)	(yellow card) 80'
CF	9	Adisak Kraisorn		(substituted off) 74'
CF	21	Poramet Arjvirai		(substituted off) 79'
Substitutes:
MF	17	Ekanit Panya		(substituted on) 74'
FW	11	Bordin Phala		(substituted on) 79'
MF	7	Sumanya Purisai		(substituted on) 84'
Manager:
(Brazil) Alexandré Pölking

Man of the Match:
Theerathon Bunmathan (Thailand)

Referee assistant:
Park Kyun-yong (South Korea)
Kang Dong-ho (South Korea)
Fourth official:
Thoriq Alkatiri (Indonesia)

Overall
Statistics	Vietnam	Thailand
Goals scored	2	2
Total shots	10	6
Shots on target	4	1
Ball possession	53.5%	46.5%
Corner kicks	3	1
Fouls committed	11	7
Offsides	0	3
Yellow cards	2	2
Red cards	0	0

=== Second leg ===
==== Pre-match ====
===== Officiating =====
On 14 January 2023, Jumpei Iida of Japan was named as the referee for the second leg of the final, with fellow Japanese Isao Nishihashi and Takumi Takagi as assistant referees. Nazmi Nasaruddin of Malaysia were named as the fourth official. He was previously a referee at the 2019 AFC Asian Cup, 2023 AFC Asian Cup, 2013 AFC U-22 Championship, 2018 AFC U-23 Championship, 2020 AFC U-23 Championship, 2022 AFC U-23 Asian Cup and 2024 AFC U-23 Asian Cup. He became the third Japanese to referee an ASEAN Championship final (after 1996 final, 2010 final first leg, 2012 final first leg and as himself at the 2016 final first leg).

===== Dignitaries in attendance =====
FIFA president Gianni Infantino and Deputy Secretary General Mattias Grafström along with AFF president Khiev Sameth, FAT president Somyot Poompanmoung and VFF president Trần Quốc Tuấn attended the second leg of the AFF Championship final.

16 January 2023
19:30 UTC+7

Thailand	1–0	Vietnam
Theerathon 24'	Report (AFFMEC); Report (AFF)

Thammasat Stadium, Pathum Thani
Attendance: 19,306
Referee: Jumpei Iida (Japan)

Thailand	Vietnam

GK	1	Kampol Pathomakkakul
CB	12	Kritsada Kaman
CB	4	Pansa Hemviboon
CB	6	Sarach Yooyen		(substituted off) 73'
RWB	15	Suphanan Bureerat	(yellow card) 84'
LWB	2	Sasalak Haiprakhon		(substituted off) 90+1'
CM	18	Weerathep Pomphan		(substituted off) 87'
CM	8	Peeradon Chamratsamee	(yellow card) 19' (yellow-red card) 90+5'
CM	3	Theerathon Bunmathan (c)
CF	9	Adisak Kraisorn		(substituted off) 73'
CF	21	Poramet Arjvirai		(substituted off) 73'
Substitutes:
FW	11	Bordin Phala	(yellow card) 77'	(substituted on) 73'
MF	17	Ekanit Panya		(substituted on) 73'
DF	16	Jakkapan Praisuwan		(substituted on) 73'
MF	7	Sumanya Purisai		(substituted on) 87'
DF	5	Chalermsak Aukkee		(substituted on) 90+1'
Manager:
(Brazil) Alexandré Pölking

GK	23	Đặng Văn Lâm
CB	6	Nguyễn Thanh Bình	(yellow card) 89'
CB	3	Quế Ngọc Hải	(yellow card) 86'
CB	12	Bùi Hoàng Việt Anh		(substituted off) 46'
RWB	17	Vũ Văn Thanh	(yellow card) 29'	(substituted off) 68'
LWB	5	Đoàn Văn Hậu
CM	8	Đỗ Hùng Dũng (c)		(substituted off) 75'
CM	11	Nguyễn Tuấn Anh		(substituted off) 36'
CM	14	Nguyễn Hoàng Đức
SS	20	Phan Văn Đức	(yellow card) 39'	(substituted off) 46'
CF	22	Nguyễn Tiến Linh	(yellow card) 59'
Substitutes:
MF	19	Nguyễn Quang Hải		(substituted on) 36'
DF	2	Đỗ Duy Mạnh		(substituted on) 46'
FW	18	Phạm Tuấn Hải		(substituted on) 46'
DF	16	Nguyễn Thành Chung		(substituted on) 68'
FW	9	Nguyễn Văn Toàn		(substituted on) 75'
Manager:
(South Korea) Park Hang-seo

Man of the Match:
Theerathon Bunmathan (Thailand)

Referee assistant:
Isao Nishihashi (Japan)
Takumi Takagi (Japan)
Fourth official:
Nazmi Nasaruddin (Malaysia)

Overall
Statistics	Thailand	Vietnam
Goals scored	1	0
Total shots	6	9
Shots on target	2	2
Ball possession	50.7%	49.3%
Corner kicks	2	2
Fouls committed	14	15
Offsides	5	0
Yellow cards	2	5
Red cards	1	0
