= 2022 VFF Tri-Nations Series =

International football tournament

2022 VFF Tri Nation Series
Hưng Thịnh Friendly Football Tournament

Tournament details
- Host country: Vietnam
- City: Ho Chi Minh city
- Dates: 21–27 September 2022
- Teams: 3 (from 1 confederation)

Final positions
- Champions: Vietnam (1st title)
- Runners-up: India
- Third place: Singapore

Tournament statistics
- Matches played: 3
- Goals scored: 9 (3 per match)
- Top scorer(s): (Vietnam) Nguyễn Văn Quyết (2 goals)

The VFF Tri Nation Series, also known as Hưng Thịnh International Football Tournament for sponsorship reason, and the eleventh edition of VFF Cup was a football tournament that consists the Indian, Singaporean and host Vietnamese national teams as participants. It is being played from 21 September to 27 September 2022. The VFF organized the tournament by means of preparing their national team for the 2022 AFF Championship.

== Participating nations ==
Three nations from the Asian Football Confederation participated in the tournament.

FIFA Rankings, as of 25 August 2022

Nation	FIFA ranking
Vietnam (Hosts)	97
India	104
Singapore	159

== Squads ==
=== India ===
The following 23 players were named in the final squad.

Caps and goals are correct as of 24 September 2022, after the match against Singapore.

No.	Pos.	Player	Date of birth (age)	Caps	Goals	Club
1	GK	Gurpreet Singh Sandhu (vice-captain)	3 February 1992 (age 34)	55	0	(All India Football Federation) Bengaluru
13	GK	Dheeraj Singh Moirangthem	4 July 2000 (age 26)	0	0	(All India Football Federation) Goa
23	GK	Amrinder Singh	27 May 1993 (age 33)	7	0	(All India Football Federation) Odisha
2	DF	Anwar Ali Jr.	28 August 2000 (age 25)	7	1	(All India Football Federation) Goa
3	DF	Narender Gahlot	24 April 2001 (age 25)	4	1	(All India Football Federation) Odisha
4	DF	Chinglensana Singh Konsham	27 November 1996 (age 29)	9	0	(All India Football Federation) Hyderabad
5	DF	Sandesh Jhingan	21 July 1993 (age 32)	46	4	(All India Football Federation) Bengaluru
6	DF	Akash Mishra	27 November 2001 (age 24)	10	0	(All India Football Federation) Hyderabad
8	DF	Harmanjot Singh Khabra	18 March 1988 (age 38)	5	0	(All India Football Federation) Kerala Blasters
12	DF	Naorem Roshan Singh	2 February 1999 (age 27)	6	0	(All India Football Federation) Bengaluru
7	MF	Anirudh Thapa	15 January 1998 (age 28)	37	3	(All India Football Federation) Chennaiyin
10	MF	Brandon Fernandes	20 September 1994 (age 31)	18	0	(All India Football Federation) Goa
14	MF	Rahul Kannoly Praveen	16 February 2000 (age 26)	1	0	(All India Football Federation) Kerala Blasters
15	MF	Udanta Singh	14 June 1996 (age 30)	38	1	(All India Football Federation) Bengaluru
16	MF	Mohammad Yasir	14 April 1998 (age 28)	12	0	(All India Football Federation) Hyderabad
18	MF	Sahal Abdul Samad	1 April 1997 (age 29)	19	2	(All India Football Federation) Kerala Blasters
22	MF	Ashique Kuruniyan	18 June 1997 (age 29)	26	2	(All India Football Federation) ATK Mohun Bagan
25	MF	Jeakson Singh Thounaojam	21 June 2001 (age 25)	5	0	(All India Football Federation) Kerala Blasters
11	FW	Sunil Chhetri (captain)	3 August 1984 (age 41)	130	84	(All India Football Federation) Bengaluru
14	FW	Ishan Pandita	26 May 1998 (age 28)	5	1	(All India Football Federation) Jamshedpur
17	FW	Liston Colaco	12 November 1998 (age 27)	13	0	(All India Football Federation) ATK Mohun Bagan
26	FW	Lallianzuala Chhangte	8 June 1997 (age 29)	16	4	(All India Football Federation) Mumbai City
	FW	Vikram Partap Singh Sandhu	16 January 2002 (age 24)	0	0	(All India Football Federation) Mumbai City

=== Vietnam ===
The following players were called-up. Caps and goals as of 27 September 2022 after the match against India.

No.	Pos.	Player	Date of birth (age)	Caps	Goals	Club
1	GK	Trần Nguyên Mạnh	20 December 1991 (age 34)	33	0	(Vietnam Football Federation) Viettel
18	GK	Nguyễn Văn Toản	26 November 1999 (age 26)	2	0	(Vietnam Football Federation) Hải Phòng
23	GK	Đặng Văn Lâm	13 August 1993 (age 32)	27	0	(Vietnam Football Federation) Topenland Bình Định
2	DF	Đỗ Duy Mạnh	29 September 1996 (age 29)	41	1	(Vietnam Football Federation) Hà Nội
3	DF	Quế Ngọc Hải (vice-captain)	15 May 1993 (age 33)	64	4	(Vietnam Football Federation) Sông Lam Nghệ An
4	DF	Bùi Tiến Dũng (vice-captain)	2 October 1995 (age 30)	41	1	(Vietnam Football Federation) Viettel
5	DF	Đoàn Văn Hậu	19 April 1999 (age 27)	28	0	(Vietnam Football Federation) Hà Nội
6	DF	Nguyễn Thanh Bình	2 November 2000 (age 25)	6	1	(Vietnam Football Federation) Viettel
7	DF	Nguyễn Thanh Nhân	25 October 2000 (age 25)	1	1	(Vietnam Football Federation) Hoàng Anh Gia Lai
13	DF	Hồ Tấn Tài	6 November 1997 (age 28)	13	3	(Vietnam Football Federation) Topenland Bình Định
16	DF	Nguyễn Thành Chung	8 September 1997 (age 28)	16	0	(Vietnam Football Federation) Hà Nội
17	DF	Bùi Hoàng Việt Anh	1 January 1999 (age 27)	6	0	(Vietnam Football Federation) Hà Nội
	DF	Vũ Văn Thanh	14 April 1996 (age 30)	35	3	(Vietnam Football Federation) Hoàng Anh Gia Lai
	DF	Trần Đình Trọng	25 April 1997 (age 29)	15	0	(Vietnam Football Federation) Topenland Bình Định
	DF	Phan Tuấn Tài	7 January 2001 (age 25)	1	0	(Vietnam Football Federation) Viettel
8	MF	Đỗ Hùng Dũng (captain)	8 September 1993 (age 32)	24	0	(Vietnam Football Federation) Hà Nội
11	MF	Nguyễn Tuấn Anh	16 May 1995 (age 31)	27	1	(Vietnam Football Federation) Hoàng Anh Gia Lai
14	MF	Châu Ngọc Quang	1 February 1996 (age 30)	2	0	(Vietnam Football Federation) Hải Phòng
19	MF	Nguyễn Quang Hải	12 April 1997 (age 29)	45	10	(French Football Federation) Pau
20	MF	Phan Văn Đức	11 April 1996 (age 30)	34	5	(Vietnam Football Federation) Sông Lam Nghệ An
21	MF	Khuất Văn Khang	11 May 2003 (age 23)	2	1	(Vietnam Football Federation) Viettel
	MF	Lương Xuân Trường	28 April 1995 (age 31)	41	1	(Vietnam Football Federation) Hoàng Anh Gia Lai
	MF	Lương Duy Cương	7 November 2001 (age 24)	1	0	(Vietnam Football Federation) SHB Đà Nẵng
9	FW	Nguyễn Văn Toàn	12 April 1996 (age 30)	43	5	(Vietnam Football Federation) Hoàng Anh Gia Lai
10	FW	Nguyễn Công Phượng	21 January 1995 (age 31)	54	11	(Vietnam Football Federation) Hoàng Anh Gia Lai
12	FW	Nguyễn Văn Quyết	1 July 1991 (age 35)	53	15	(Vietnam Football Federation) Hà Nội
15	FW	Phạm Tuấn Hải	19 May 1998 (age 28)	7	2	(Vietnam Football Federation) Hà Nội
22	FW	Nguyễn Tiến Linh	20 October 1997 (age 28)	31	12	(Vietnam Football Federation) Becamex Bình Dương
	FW	Nhâm Mạnh Dũng	12 April 2000 (age 26)	1	0	(Vietnam Football Federation) Viettel
	FW	Phạm Đình Duy	2 April 2002 (age 24)	1	0	(Vietnam Football Federation) SHB Đà Nẵng

=== Singapore ===
The following 23 players were selected. Caps and goals updated as of 24 Sept 2022, after the match against India.

No.	Pos.	Player	Date of birth (age)	Caps	Goals	Club
1	GK	Zaiful Nizam	24 July 1987 (age 38)	3	0	(Football Association of Singapore) Geylang International
18	GK	Hassan Sunny	2 April 1984 (age 42)	100	0	(Football Association of Singapore) Lion City Sailors
30	GK	Mukundan Maran	21 July 1998 (age 27)	0	0	(Football Association of Singapore) Hougang United
3	DF	Joshua Pereira	10 October 1997 (age 28)	2	0	(Football Association of Singapore) Geylang International
4	DF	Nazrul Nazari	11 February 1991 (age 35)	56	0	(Football Association of Singapore) Hougang United
5	DF	Amirul Adli	13 January 1996 (age 30)	21	0	(Football Association of Singapore) Lion City Sailors
14	DF	Hariss Harun (captain)	19 November 1990 (age 35)	115	11	(Football Association of Singapore) Lion City Sailors
16	DF	Ryhan Stewart	15 February 2000 (age 26)	3	0	(Football Association of Thailand) Chiangmai
17	DF	Irfan Fandi	13 August 1997 (age 28)	42	1	(Football Association of Thailand) BG Pathum United
21	DF	Ryaan Sanizal	31 May 2002 (age 24)	3	0	(Football Association of Singapore) Tampines Rovers
2	MF	Syed Firdaus Hassan	30 May 1998 (age 28)	1	0	(Football Association of Singapore) Tampines Rovers
6	MF	Anumanthan Kumar	14 July 1994 (age 31)	26	0	(Football Association of Singapore) Lion City Sailors
7	MF	Shah Shahiran	14 November 1999 (age 26)	7	0	(Football Association of Singapore) Young Lions
8	MF	Shahdan Sulaiman	9 May 1988 (age 38)	80	6	(Football Association of Singapore) Lion City Sailors
11	MF	Hafiz Nor	22 August 1988 (age 37)	16	2	(Football Association of Singapore) Lion City Sailors
13	MF	Adam Swandi	12 January 1996 (age 30)	16	1	(Football Association of Singapore) Lion City Sailors
15	MF	Ho Wai Loon	20 August 1993 (age 32)	3	0	(Football Association of Singapore) Balestier Khalsa
9	FW	Ikhsan Fandi	9 April 1999 (age 27)	32	17	(Football Association of Thailand) BG Pathum United
10	FW	Taufik Suparno	31 October 1995 (age 30)	5	0	(Football Association of Singapore) Tampines Rovers
19	FW	Ilhan Fandi	8 November 2002 (age 23)	4	0	(Japan Football Association) Albirex Niigata (S)
20	FW	Hazzuwan Halim	2 February 1994 (age 32)	6	0	(Football Association of Singapore) Geylang International
22	FW	Glenn Kweh	26 March 2000 (age 26)	5	0	(Football Association of Singapore) Young Lions
23	FW	Sahil Suhaimi	8 July 1992 (age 34)	21	1	(Football Association of Singapore) Hougang United

== Prize money ==
Position	Amount (USD)
Champions	30000
Runners-up	20000
Third place	10000

== Standings ==
All times are National Standard Time – UTC+7

Pos	Team	Pld	W	D	L	GF	GA	GD	Pts	
1	Vietnam (H)	2	2	0	0	7	0	+7	6	Champions
2	India	2	0	1	1	1	4	−3	1	Runners-up
3	Singapore	2	0	1	1	1	5	−4	1	Third place

(H) Hosts

== Matches ==
21 September 2022
19:00

Vietnam	4–0	Singapore
Nguyễn Văn Quyết 37'; Nguyễn Thanh Nhân 50'; Hồ Tấn Tài 71'; Khuất Văn Khang 84'	Report

Thống Nhất Stadium, Ho Chi Minh City, Vietnam
Attendance: 9,016
Referee: Clifford Daypuyat (Philippines)
24 September 2022
19:00

India	1–1	Singapore
Kuruniyan 43'	Report	Ikhsan 37'

Thống Nhất Stadium, Ho Chi Minh City, Vietnam
Referee: Hoàng Ngọc Hà (Vietnam)
27 September 2022
19:00

Vietnam	3–0	India
Phan Văn Đức 10'; Nguyễn Văn Toàn 49'; Nguyễn Văn Quyết 70'	Report

Thống Nhất Stadium, Ho Chi Minh City, Vietnam
Attendance: 5,768
Referee: Clifford Daypuyat (Philippines)

== Statistics ==
=== Goalscorers ===
2 goals

- (Vietnam) Nguyễn Văn Quyết

1 goal

- (India) Ashique Kuruniyan
- (Singapore) Ikhsan Fandi
- (Vietnam) Hồ Tấn Tài
- (Vietnam) Khuất Văn Khang
- (Vietnam) Nguyễn Thanh Nhân
- (Vietnam) Nguyễn Văn Toàn
- (Vietnam) Phan Văn Đức

=== Assists ===
1 assist

- (Vietnam) Phan Văn Đức
- (India) Sunil Chhetri
- (Vietnam) Đỗ Hùng Dũng

=== Clean sheets ===
1 clean sheet

- (Vietnam) Đặng Văn Lâm
- (Vietnam) Trần Nguyên Mạnh
