= Châu Ngọc Quang =

Vietnamese footballer (born 1996)

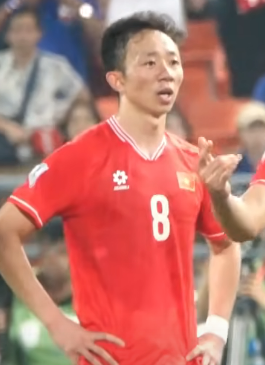
- Ngọc Quang in 2025

Personal information
- Full name: Châu Ngọc Quang
- Date of birth: 1 February 1996 (age 30)
- Place of birth: Tam Kỳ, Quảng Nam, Vietnam
- Height: 1.70 m (5 ft 7 in)
- Positions: Winger; attacking midfielder

Team information
- Current team: Ninh Bình
- Number: 10

Youth career
- 2007–2015: Hoàng Anh Gia Lai

Senior career*
Years	Team	Apps	(Gls)
2014–2025	Hoàng Anh Gia Lai	123	(18)
2014–2015	→ Phú Yên (loan)		
2016	→ Đắk Lắk (loan)		
2018	→ Viettel (loan)	2	(0)
2022	→ Hải Phòng (loan)	20	(1)
2025–	Ninh Bình	5	(0)

International career^{‡}
2017–2018	Vietnam U23	3	(0)
2022–	Vietnam	13	(2)
Medal record
Men's football
Representing Vietnam
AFC U-23 Championship
Runner-up	China 2018	Team
ASEAN Championship
Runner-up	ASEAN 2022	Team
Winner	ASEAN 2024	Team
- * Club domestic league appearances and goals as of 28 September 2025 ‡ National team caps and goals as of 10 June 2025

Châu Ngọc Quang (born 1 February 1996) is a Vietnamese professional footballer who plays as a winger or attacking midfielder for V.League 1 club Ninh Bình and the Vietnam national team.

== Club career ==
Ngọc Quang is a product of the Hoàng Anh Gia Lai youth academy. He was promoted to the Hoàng Anh Gia Lai first team in the 2016 season. He made his V.League 1 debut as a substitute in a 0-1 loss to SHB Đà Nẵng on 4 March 2017.

In June 2018, Ngọc Quang and Đinh Thanh Bình were loaned by Hoàng Anh Gia Lai to Viettel to play in the second half of the 2018 V.League 1. After his loan spell with Viettel ended in 2019, he returned to Hoàng Anh Gia Lai.

In the 2021 season, under the management of Kiatisuk Senamuang, Ngọc Quang became a key player for the team with his good performances. He contributed in his team's runner-up campaign in the V.League 1 that season.

== International career ==
In January 2018, Ngọc Quang participated in the 2018 AFC U-23 Championship with the Vietnam U23.

In November 2022, he was called up to the Vietnam national team for the first time and made his debut in a 3–0 win against Myanmar at the 2022 AFF Championship, where he also scored his first international goal.

== International goals ==
Scores and results list Vietnam's goal tally first.

No	Date	Venue	Opponent	Score	Result	Competition
1.	3 January 2023	Mỹ Đình National Stadium, Hanoi, Vietnam	Myanmar	3–0	3–0	2022 AFF Championship
2.	25 March 2025	Gò Đậu Stadium, Thủ Dầu Một, Vietnam	Laos	1–0	5–0	2027 AFC Asian Cup qualification

== Honours ==
Viettel

- V.League 2: 2018

Vietnam

- ASEAN Championship: 2024
- VFF Cup: 2022
