= Jakkapan Praisuwan =

Thai footballer (born 1994)

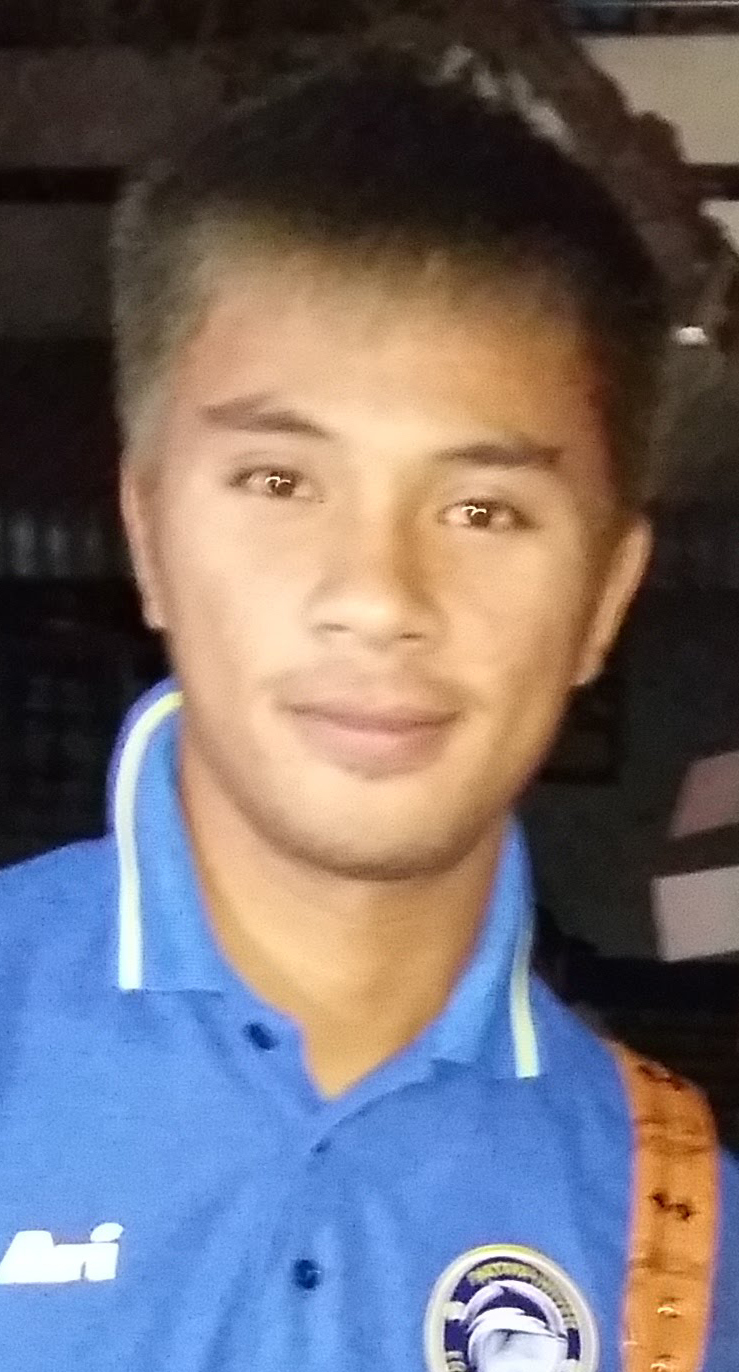

Personal information
- Full name: Jakkapan Praisuwan
- Date of birth: 16 August 1994 (age 32)
- Place of birth: Songkhla, Thailand
- Height: 1.79 m (5 ft 10 in)
- Positions: Centre back; defensive midfielder

Team information
- Current team: Buriram United
- Number: 39

Youth career
- 2012–2014: Suankularb Wittayalai School
- 2014: Chamchuri United

Senior career*
Years	Team	Apps	(Gls)
2015	Chamchuri United	16	(2)
2016–2021	Samut Prakan City	102	(4)
2021–2024	BG Pathum United	68	(5)
2024	→ Muangthong United (loan)	8	(0)
2025–2026	Bangkok United	38	(0)
2026–	Buriram United	2	(0)

International career
2014	Thailand U21	2	(0)
2022–2024	Thailand	12	(1)
Medal record
Thailand
Asean Football Championship
Winner	AFF Mitsubishi Electric Cup 2022	2022
- * Club domestic league appearances and goals as of 08:00, 28 October 2025 (UTC)

Jakkapan Praisuwan (Thai: จักพัน ไพรสุวรรณ, born 16 August 1994) is a Thai professional footballer who plays as a centre back or a defensive midfielder for Thai League 1 club Buriram United.

== Club career ==
=== Chamcuri United ===
Jakkapan started his career at third tier club, Chamchuri United ahead of the 2015 season.

=== Pattaya United (now known as Samut Prakan City) ===
In 2016, Jakkapan moved to Pattaya United where the club was renamed to Samut Prakan City in 2019. He has amassed a total of 115 league appearances during his time at the club.

=== BG Pathum United ===
On 19 July 2021, Jakkapan moved to a big club in Thai League 1, BG Pathum United.

== International career ==
In May 2022, Jakkapan was called up for an international friendly. He make his international debut in a 1–0 win against Turkmenistan on 27 May 2022. In December 2022, Jakkapan was called up for the 2022 AFF Championship by head coach Alexandré Pölking where he was part of the winning squad in the tournament.

On 17 October 2023, Jakkapan scored his first international goal against European nation, Estonia.

=== International goals ===
No	Date	Venue	Opponent	Score	Result	Competition
1	17 October 2023	Lilleküla Stadium, Tallinn, Estonia	Estonia	1–1	1–1	Friendly

== Honours ==
=== Club ===
==== BG Pathum United ====
- Thailand Champions Cup (1): 2021, 2022
- Thai League Cup: 2023–24

=== International ===
==== Thailand ====
- AFF Championship (1): 2022
