= Ekanit Panya =

Thai footballer (born 1999)

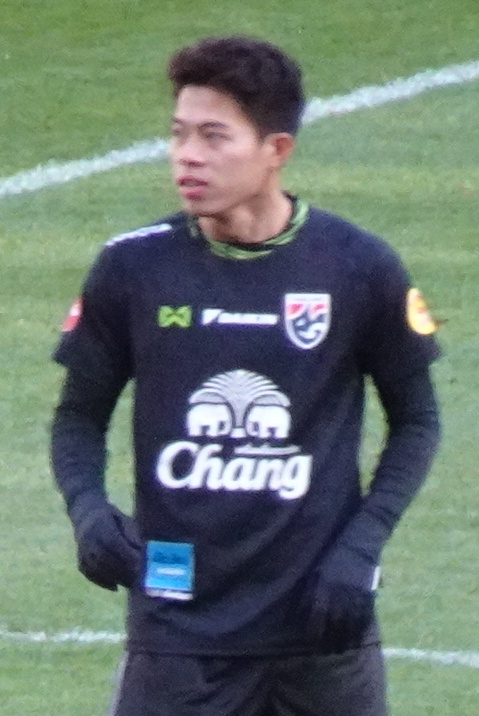
- Panya in training with Thailand in 2024

Personal information
- Full name: Ekanit Panya
- Date of birth: 21 October 1999 (age 27)
- Place of birth: Chiang Rai, Thailand
- Height: 1.68 m (5 ft 6 in)
- Positions: Attacking midfielder; winger

Team information
- Current team: Ratchaburi
- Number: 21

Youth career
- 2010–2015: Chiangrai United

Senior career*
| Years | Team | Apps | (Gls) |
| 2015–2022 | Chiangrai United | 54 | (7) |
| 2017 | → Chiangrai City (loan) | 20 | (3) |
| 2018–2019 | → Chiangmai (loan) | 43 | (11) |
| 2022 | → Chiangmai United (loan) | 13 | (2) |
| 2022–2024 | Muangthong United | 28 | (3) |
| 2023–2024 | → Urawa Red Diamonds (loan) | 14 | (0) |
| 2025– | BG Pathum United | 15 | (3) |
| 2025 | → Ehime (loan) | 3 | (0) |
| 2026– | → Ratchaburi (loan) | 6 | (4) |

International career^{‡}
| 2016 | Thailand U16 | 1 | (0) |
| 2021–2022 | Thailand U23 | 9 | (2) |
| 2019– | Thailand | 29 | (2) |
Medal record
Thailand under-19
AFF U-19 Youth Championship
| Winner | AFF U-18 Youth Championship 2017 | Football |
Thailand under-23
SEA Games
| Silver medal – second place | Hanoi 2021 | Team |
Thailand
Asean Football Championship
| Winner | Mitsubishi Electric Cup 2022 | Team |
| Runner-up | Mitsubishi Electric Cup 2024 | Team |
- * Club domestic league appearances and goals as of 9 October 2026 ‡ National team caps and goals as of 4 September 2025

Ekanit Panya (Thai: เอกนิษฐ์ ปัญญา; born 21 October 1999) is a Thai professional footballer who plays as an attacking midfielder or a winger for Thai League 1 club Ratchaburi and the Thailand national team.

== Club career ==
=== Chiangrai United ===
Ekanit spent his entire youth career at Chiangrai United before being promoted to the senior team in 2015. He won the Thai League 1 title with Chiangrai United in the 2019 season.

=== Muangthong United ===
After 12 years at Chiangrai United, Ekanit moved to Muangthong United on a permanent transfer.

==== Loan to Urawa Red Diamonds ====
On 24 July 2023, Ekanit was loaned to 2022 AFC Champions League champions, Urawa Red Diamonds until the end of the year. In the 2023–24 AFC Champions League group stage match on 4 October 2022, Ekanit came on as a substitute and in the 85th minute where he scored his first goal on his debut for the club to secured a massive 6–0 home win against Vietnamese side, Hanoi.

On 20 October, Ekanit played the first match in J1 League against Kashiwa Reysol by substitution from the bench to the field in the 73rd minute of this match. Ekanit became the first Thai player in FIFA Club World Cup history after he was registered by Urawa Red Diamonds to participate in the 2023 FIFA Club World Cup.

=== BG Pathum United ===
On January 6, 2025, Ekanit signed with Thai League 1 club BG Pathum United

==== Ehime FC ====
On January 20, 2025, Ekanit was loaned to J2 League club Ehime FC

==== Ratchaburi F.C. ====
On July 22, 2026, Ekanit was loaned to Thai League 1 club Ratchaburi F.C.

== International career ==
In September 2017, he won the 2017 AFF U-18 Youth Championship with the Thailand U-19 team. He was called up to the senior squad for the 2022 FIFA World Cup qualification second round in September 2019. In 2022, he was called up for the 2022 AFF Championship by Head Coach Alexandré Pölking.

Ekanit was called up for the 2023 AFC Asian Cup but later withdrew to focus for the club. His decision received a lot of criticism from Thai fans.

== Career statistics ==
=== Club ===
As of match played 9 December 2023

Appearances and goals by club, season and competition
| Club | Season | League | | | National cup | | League cup | | Continental | | Other | | Total | |
| Club | Season | Division | Apps | Goals | Apps | Goals | Apps | Goals | Apps | Goals | Apps | Goals | Apps | Goals |
|---|---|---|---|---|---|---|---|---|---|---|---|---|---|---|
| Chiangrai United | 2015 | Thai League 1 | 8 | 1 | 0 | 0 | 0 | 0 | 0 | 0 | 0 | 0 | 8 | 1 |
| Chiangrai United | 2016 | Thai League 1 | 4 | 0 | 0 | 0 | 0 | 0 | 0 | 0 | 0 | 0 | 4 | 0 |
| Chiangrai United | Total | | 12 | 1 | 0 | 0 | 0 | 0 | 0 | 0 | 0 | 0 | 12 | 1 |
| Chiangrai City (loan) | 2017 | Thai League 4 | 20 | 3 | 0 | 0 | 0 | 0 | 0 | 0 | 0 | 0 | 20 | 3 |
| Chiangmai (loan) | 2018 | Thai League 1 | 0 | 0 | 0 | 0 | 0 | 0 | 0 | 0 | 0 | 0 | 0 | 0 |
| Chiangmai (loan) | 2019 | Thai League 1 | 16 | 0 | 1 | 0 | 0 | 0 | 0 | 0 | 0 | 0 | 17 | 0 |
| Chiangmai (loan) | Total | | 16 | 0 | 1 | 0 | 0 | 0 | 0 | 0 | 0 | 0 | 17 | 0 |
| Chiangrai United | 2019 | Thai League 1 | 12 | 5 | 1 | 0 | 0 | 0 | 4 | 1 | 1 | 0 | 15 | 6 |
| Chiangrai United | 2020–21 | Thai League 1 | 18 | 0 | 3 | 0 | 0 | 0 | 6 | 0 | 0 | 0 | 27 | 0 |
| Chiangrai United | 2021–22 | Thai League 1 | 11 | 0 | 1 | 0 | 0 | 0 | 0 | 0 | 1 | 0 | 13 | 0 |
| Chiangrai United | Total | | 41 | 5 | 5 | 0 | 0 | 0 | 10 | 1 | 2 | 0 | 55 | 6 |
| Chiangmai United (loan) | 2021–22 | Thai League 1 | 13 | 2 | 0 | 0 | 0 | 0 | 0 | 0 | 0 | 0 | 13 | 2 |
| Muangthong United | 2022–23 | Thai League 1 | 28 | 3 | 3 | 2 | 2 | 1 | 0 | 0 | 0 | 0 | 33 | 5 |
| Urawa Red Diamonds (loan) | 2023 | J1 League | 5 | 0 | 0 | 0 | 2 | 0 | 4 | 1 | 0 | 0 | 11 | 1 |
| Urawa Red Diamonds (loan) | 2024 | J1 League | 9 | 0 | 0 | 0 | 0 | 0 | 0 | 0 | 0 | 0 | 0 | 0 |
| Urawa Red Diamonds (loan) | Total | | 5 | 0 | 0 | 0 | 2 | 0 | 4 | 1 | 0 | 0 | 11 | 1 |
| Career Total | | | 135 | 14 | 9 | 2 | 4 | 1 | 14 | 2 | 2 | 0 | 161 | 18 |

=== International ===
As of 4 September 2025

| National team | Year | Apps | Goals |
|---|---|---|---|
| Thailand | 2019 | 5 | 1 |
| Thailand | 2021 | 2 | 0 |
| Thailand | 2022 | 5 | 0 |
| Thailand | 2023 | 7 | 0 |
| Thailand | 2024 | 6 | 1 |
| Thailand | 2025 | 4 | 0 |
| Thailand | Total | 29 | 2 |

=== International goals ===
==== Senior ====
Scores and results list Thailand's goal tally first.

| No. | Date | Venue | Opponent | Score | Result | Competition |
|---|---|---|---|---|---|---|
| 1. | 15 October 2019 | Thammasat Stadium, Pathum Thani, Thailand | United Arab Emirates | 2–1 | 2–1 | 2022 FIFA World Cup qualification |
| 2. | 14 October 2024 | Tinsulanon Stadium, Songkhla, Thailand | Syria | 1–0 | 2–1 | 2024 King's Cup |

==== U23 ====
Ekanit Panya – goals for Thailand U23
| # | Date | Venue | Opponent | Score | Result | Competition |
|---|---|---|---|---|---|---|
| 1. | 7 June 2019 | Jalan Besar Stadium, Kallang, Singapore | Indonesia | 2–0 | 2–1 | 2019 Merlion Cup |
| 2. | 9 May 2022 | Thiên Trường Stadium, Nam Định, Vietnam | Singapore | 3–0 | 5–0 | 2021 Southeast Asian Games |
| 3. | 9 May 2022 | Thiên Trường Stadium, Nam Định, Vietnam | Singapore | 4–0 | 5–0 | 2021 Southeast Asian Games |

==== U21 ====
Ekanit Panya – goals for Thailand U21
| # | Date | Venue | Opponent | Score | Result | Competition |
|---|---|---|---|---|---|---|
| 1. | 17 July 2018 | Boonyachinda Stadium, Bangkok, Thailand | Hong Kong | 1–0 | 1–0 | Friendly |

==== U19 ====
Ekanit Panya – goals for Thailand U19
| # | Date | Venue | Opponent | Score | Result | Competition |
|---|---|---|---|---|---|---|
| 1. | 17 March 2017 | Diamond Hill, Hong Kong | Singapore | 1–2 | 1–3 | 2017 Jockey Club Tournament |
| 2. | 4 September 2017 | Yangon, Myanmar | Timor-Leste | 1–0 | 3–0 | 2017 AFF U-18 Youth Championship |
| 3. | 15 September 2017 | Yangon, Myanmar | Malaysia | 1–0 | 2–0 | 2017 AFF U-18 Youth Championship |
| 4. | 6 November 2017 | Ulaanbaatar, Mongolia | Mongolia | 2–5 | 2–5 | 2018 AFC U-19 Championship qualification |
| 5. | 23 March 2018 | Dubai, United Arab Emirates | Saudi Arabia | 1–0 | 1–2 | 2018 Dubai Cup |

== Honours ==
Chiangrai United

- Thai League 1: 2019
- Thai FA Cup: 2020–21

Urawa Red Diamonds

- J.League Cup runner-up: 2023

Thailand U-19

- AFF U-19 Youth Championship: 2017
- Jockey Club Tournament: 2017

Thailand U-23

- Southeast Asian Games Silver medal: 2021

Thailand

- AFF Championship: 2022
- King's Cup: 2024
