= Nguyễn Thanh Bình (footballer, born 2000) =

Vietnamese footballer

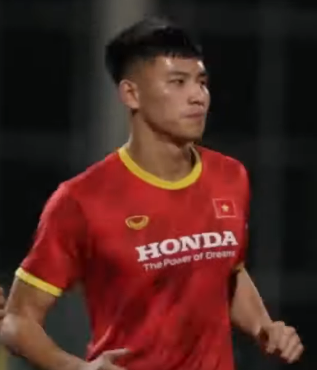
- Thanh Bình in 2021

Personal information
- Full name: Nguyễn Thanh Bình
- Date of birth: 2 November 2000 (age 26)
- Place of birth: Vũ Thư, Thái Bình, Vietnam
- Height: 1.83 m (6 ft 0 in)
- Position: Centre back

Team information
- Current team: Viettel
- Number: 3

Youth career
- 2012–2019: Viettel

Senior career*
Years	Team	Apps	(Gls)
2019–	Viettel	101	(1)
2019	→ Huế (loan)	13	(0)
2020	→ Bình Định (loan)	14	(1)

International career^{‡}
2021–2022	Vietnam U23	10	(0)
2021–	Vietnam	26	(1)
Medal record
Men's football
Representing Vietnam
SEA Games
Gold medal – first place	Hanoi 2021	Team
ASEAN Championship
Runner-up	ASEAN 2022	Team
Winner	ASEAN 2024	Team
- * Club domestic league appearances and goals as of 23 May 2025 ‡ National team caps and goals as of 25 March 2025

Nguyễn Thanh Bình (born 2 November 2000) is a Vietnamese professional footballer who plays as a centre back for Viettel.

== Club career ==
Bình started his career in the Viettel youth academy. In 2020, he helped Viettel's U-21 team win the U-21 national championship. He also won the V.League 2 championship with Bình Định in the same year.

Bình made his professional debut for Viettel on 16 January 2021, in a V.League 1 match against Hải Phòng. He has since become a regular starter for Viettel, helping the club finish fourth in the 2022 and 2023 seasons.

== International career ==
On 7 September 2021, Thanh Bình made his debut for the national team in a 1–0 loss against Australia in 2022 FIFA World Cup qualification. He was heavily criticized by fans after making the mistake of letting China score a goal in injury time, making Vietnam lose 2–3 on 7 October 2021.

On 29 March 2022, he scored his first goal for Vietnam with a header, against Japan, making Vietnam get a historic draw to end the 2022 FIFA World Cup qualification campaign with 4 points.

== Career statistics ==
=== International ===
As of match played 15 June 2023

Vietnam
Year	Apps	Goals
2021	2	0
2022	6	1
2023	4	0
Total	12	1

=== International goals ===
List of international goals scored by Nguyễn Thanh Bình
No.	Date	Venue	Opponent	Score	Result	Competition
1	29 March 2022	Saitama Stadium 2002, Saitama, Japan	Japan	1–0	1–1	2022 FIFA World Cup qualification

== Honours ==
Bình Định

- V.League 2: 2020

Vietnam U23

- SEA Games gold medal: 2021

Vietnam

- VFF Cup: 2022
- ASEAN Championship: 2024
