= Vũ Văn Thanh =

Vietnamese footballer (born 1996)

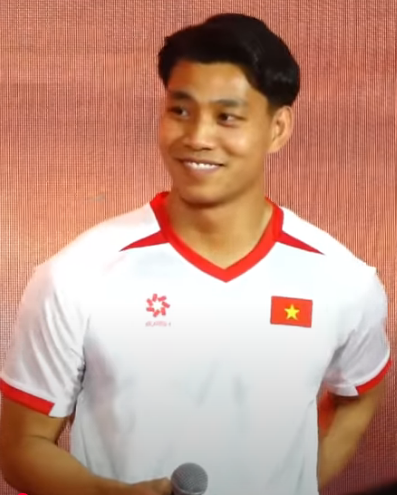
- Văn Thanh in 2025

Personal information
- Birth name: Vũ Văn Thanh
- Date of birth: 14 April 1996 (age 30)
- Place of birth: Thanh Miện, Hải Dương, Vietnam
- Height: 1.73 m (5 ft 8 in)
- Position: Right-back

Team information
- Current team: Công An Hà Nội
- Number: 17

Youth career
- 2007–2015: Hoàng Anh Gia Lai

Senior career*
Years	Team	Apps	(Gls)
2015–2023	Hoàng Anh Gia Lai	159	(26)
2023–	Công An Hà Nội	58	(7)

International career^{‡}
2013–2014	Vietnam U19	15	(6)
2015–2019	Vietnam U23	36	(2)
2016–	Vietnam	58	(5)
Medal record
Men's football
Representing Vietnam
AFC U-23 Championship
Runner-up	China 2018	Team
ASEAN Championship
Runner-up	ASEAN 2022	Team
Winner	ASEAN 2024	Team
- * Club domestic league appearances and goals as of 9 May 2025 ‡ National team caps and goals as of 19 March 2025

Vũ Văn Thanh (born 14 April 1996) is a Vietnamese professional footballer who plays as a right-back for V.League 1 club Công An Hà Nội.

== Early career ==
Vũ Văn Thanh was born in Thanh Miện district, Hải Dương province. He won the national under-11 football championship with Hải Dương under-11 team in 2007.

In 2007, Vũ Văn Thanh joined the HAGL-Arsenal HMG football academy and played continuously for HAGL's youth teams in domestic and international competitions until 2014.

== Club career ==
In 2015, Vũ Văn Thanh was promoted to the HAGL first team and quickly gain a starter spot at the club. At the 2016 V.League 1, Văn Thanh was awarded the Young Player of the Year award. He was named in the V.League 1 Team of the season for the 2017 and 2018 season.

In January 2023, Văn Thanh signed for newly promoted V.League 1 side Hanoi Police. At the end of the season, the club won the V.League 1 title, with Văn Thanh being an important player in the club's successful campaign. He was therefore named in the league's Team of the season for the third time in his career.

== International career ==
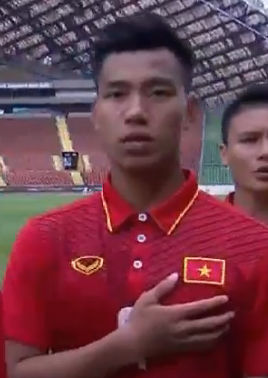
Văn Thanh with Vietnam U22 at the 2017 SEA Games

Vũ Văn Thanh played youth international football for the Vietnam at under-19, under-22 and under-23 levels. He was part of the squad that managed to reach the final of the 2018 AFC U-23 Championship after defeating Qatar in the semi-final. However, they finished runners-up to Uzbekistan.

On 24 March 2016, Thanh made his senior international debut against Chinese Taipei. He scored his first international goal on 6 October 2016 in a 5–2 win against North Korea.

== Career statistics ==
=== Club ===
As of match played 14 May 2025

Appearances and goals by club, season and competition
Club	Season	League			Cup		Continental		Other		Total	
Club	Season	Division	Apps	Goals	Apps	Goals	Apps	Goals	Apps	Goals	Apps	Goals
Hoang Anh Gia Lai	2015	V.League 1	19	2	2	0	—		—		21	2
Hoang Anh Gia Lai	2016	V.League 1	26	8	3	1	—		—		29	9
Hoang Anh Gia Lai	2017	V.League 1	23	6	1	0	—		—		24	6
Hoang Anh Gia Lai	2018	V.League 1	21	0	4	0	—		—		25	0
Hoang Anh Gia Lai	2019	V.League 1	17	2	2	0	—		—		19	2
Hoang Anh Gia Lai	2020	V.League 1	19	3	1	0	—		—		20	3
Hoang Anh Gia Lai	2021	V.League 1	12	2	1	1	—		—		13	3
Hoang Anh Gia Lai	2022	V.League 1	22	3	3	0	6 (Note: Appearances in AFC Champions League)	1	—		31	4
Hoang Anh Gia Lai	Total		159	26	17	2	6	1	—		182	29
Công An Hà Nội	2023	V.League 1	18	3	2	0	—		—		20	3
Công An Hà Nội	2023–24	V.League 1	22	3	2	0	—		1 (Note: Appearance in Vietnamese Super Cup)	0	24	3
Công An Hà Nội	2024–25	V.League 1	18	1	1	0	—		6 (Note: Appearances in ASEAN Club Championship)	0	25	1
Công An Hà Nội	2025–26	V.League 1	0	0	0	0	0	0	0	0	0	0
Công An Hà Nội	Total		58	7	5	0	0	0	7	0	70	7
Career total			217	33	22	2	6	1	7	0	252	36

=== International ===
As of match played 19 March 2025

Appearances and goals by national team and year
National team	Year	Apps	Goals
Vietnam
Vietnam	2016	9	2
Vietnam	2017	5	0
Vietnam	2018	1	0
Vietnam	2019	2	0
Vietnam	2021	12	1
Vietnam	2022	7	1
Vietnam	2023	6	1
Vietnam	2024	13	0
Vietnam	2025	3	0
Total		58	5

Scores and results list Vietnam's goal tally first, score column indicates score after each Thanh goal.

List of international goals scored by Vũ Văn Thanh
No.	Date	Venue	Opponent	Score	Result	Competition
1	6 October 2016	Thong Nhat Stadium, Ho Chi Minh City, Vietnam	North Korea	3–2	5–2	Friendly
2	7 December 2016	Mỹ Đình National Stadium, Hanoi, Vietnam	Indonesia	1–1	'2–2 (a.e.t.)	2016 AFF Championship
3	7 June 2021	Al-Maktoum Stadium, Dubai, United Arab Emirates	Indonesia	4–0	4–0	2022 FIFA World Cup qualification
4.	21 December 2022	New Laos National Stadium, Vientiane, Laos	Laos	6–0	6–0	2022 AFF Championship
5.	13 January 2023	Mỹ Đình National Stadium, Hanoi, Vietnam	Thailand	2–2	2–2	2022 AFF Championship

== Honours ==
Công An Hà Nội

- V.League 1: 2023, 2025–26
- Vietnamese National Cup: 2024–25
- Vietnamese Super Cup: 2026
- ASEAN Club Championship runner-up: 2024–25

Vietnam U23

- VFF Cup: 2018

Vietnam

- ASEAN Championship: 2024
- VFF Cup: 2022

Individual

- Vietnamese Young Player of the Year: 2016
- V.League 1 Team of the Season: 2017, 2018, 2023
