= Sumanya Purisai =

Thai footballer

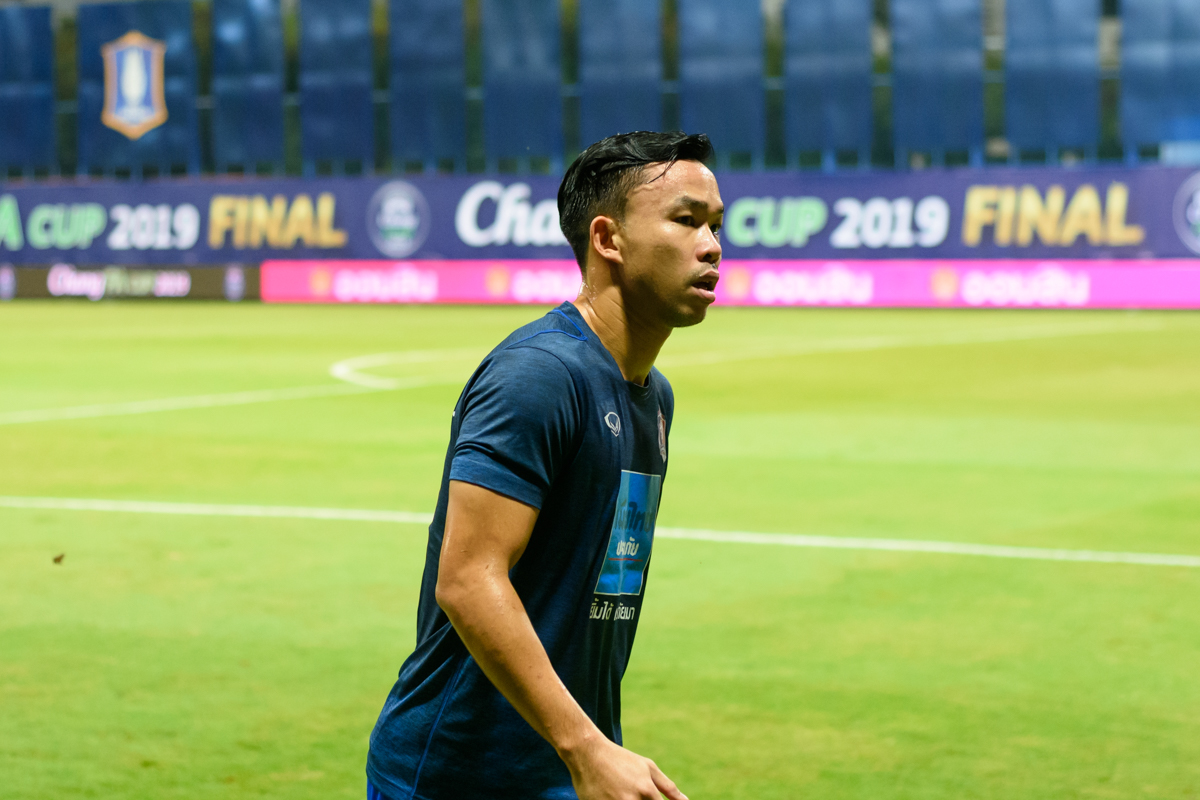
- Purisai with Port in 2019

Personal information
- Full name: Sumanya Purisai
- Date of birth: 5 December 1986 (age 39)
- Place of birth: Roi Et, Thailand
- Height: 1.73 m (5 ft 8 in)
- Position: Attacking midfielder

Team information
- Current team: Uthai Thani
- Number: 7

Youth career
- 1999: Roi Et Wittayalai School
- 2000–2004: Sisaket Sports School
- 2005–2008: Sripatum University

Senior career*
Years	Team	Apps	(Gls)
2009–2010	Osotsapa	48	(3)
2011	Buriram	24	(11)
2011–2012	Buriram United	24	(3)
2012–2014	Chainat Hornbill	74	(15)
2015–2018	Bangkok United	86	(15)
2015	→ Suphanburi (loan)	7	(0)
2019	Port	22	(3)
2020–2022	BG Pathum United	43	(5)
2022–2023	Chonburi	23	(1)
2023–	Uthai Thani	19	(1)

International career
2009	Thailand U23	2	(0)
2012–2023	Thailand	29	(1)
Medal record
Thailand
Asean Football Championship
Runner-up	AFF Suzuki Cup 2012	2012
Winner	AFF Mitsubishi Electric Cup 2022	2022
- * Club domestic league appearances and goals as of 17 September 2022

Sumanya Purisai (Thai: สุมัญญา ปุริสาย, born 5 December 1986) is a Thai professional footballer who plays as an attacking midfielder for Uthai Thani.

== International Goals ==
Scores and results list Thailand's goal tally first.

No	Date	Venue	Opponent	Score	Result	Competition
1.	2 January 2023	Thammasat Stadium, Pathum Thani, Thailand	Cambodia	2–0	3–1	2022 AFF Championship

== Honours ==
=== Club ===
Buriram

- Thai Division 1 League (1): 2010

Port

- Thai FA Cup (1): 2019

BG Pathum United

- Thai League 1 (1): 2020–21
- Thailand Champions Cup (1): 2021

=== International ===
Thailand

- AFF Championship (1): 2022
