= Hồ Tấn Tài =

Vietnamese footballer (born 1997)

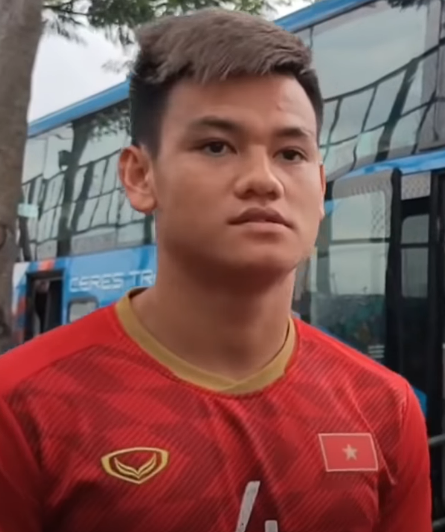
- Tấn Tài in 2019

Personal information
- Full name: Hồ Tấn Tài
- Date of birth: 6 November 1997 (age 29)
- Place of birth: Hoài Ân, Bình Định, Vietnam
- Height: 1.80 m (5 ft 11 in)
- Positions: Right-back; center-back

Team information
- Current team: Ninh Bình

Youth career
- 2008–2016: Bình Định

Senior career*
Years	Team	Apps	(Gls)
2017–2018	Bình Định	24	(1)
2018–2021	Becamex Bình Dương	64	(6)
2021–2023	Topeland Bình Định	33	(8)
2023–2024	Công An Hà Nội	42	(5)
2024–2026	Becamex Hồ Chí Minh City	20	(3)
2026–	Ninh Bình	0	(0)

International career^{‡}
2015–2017	Vietnam U19	17	(0)
2017–2018	Vietnam U20	3	(0)
2017–2020	Vietnam U23	9	(0)
2021–	Vietnam	31	(4)
Medal record
Men's football
Representing Vietnam
ASEAN Championship
Runner-up	ASEAN 2022	Team
Winner	ASEAN 2024	Team
SEA Games
Gold medal – first place	Manila 2019	Team
- * Club domestic league appearances and goals as of 7 June 2026 ‡ National team caps and goals as of 26 March 2024

Hồ Tấn Tài (born 6 November 1997) is a Vietnamese professional footballer who plays as a right-back or center-back for V.League 1 club Ninh Bình and the Vietnam national team.

== Club career ==
Hồ Tấn Tài is originally from Hoài Ân, a mountainous district in Bình Định. He had a passion for football since childhood and actively participated in youth tournaments at school and district levels. He joined Bình Đình Sports Talent School at the age of 11.

In 2015, Tấn Tài helped his team reach the Vietnamese National U-21 Championship semi-finals, the best ever result of the team in the tournament. Thereafter, was promoted to the first team and made his senior debut in the Vietnamese Second Division.

After helping Bình Định promote to V.League 2 in 2018, Tấn Tài was transferred to V.League 1 club Becamex Bình Dương. At the team, he quickly rose to become one of the top full-backs in Vietnam with his great ability to support the attack. He helped the club win the 2018 Vietnamese Cup, and was named in the V.League 1 Team of the season for the 2019 and 2020 season.

In 2021, after Bình Định promoted to the V.League 1, Tấn Tài returned to the team and was named captain. He was named for the third time in the V.League Team of the season in the 2022 season as his club finished in the league's top 3.

In 2023, Tấn Tài signed for newly promoted V.League 1 side Công An Hà Nội. He contributed to help the team win the 2023 V.League 1 title.

On 9 July 2024, Tấn Tài returned to Becamex Bình Dương, signing a three-year contract.

On 27 June 2026, Tấn Tài joined Ninh Bình, signing a three-year contract.

== International career ==
Tấn Tài was part of the Vietnam U19 squad that reached the semi-finals in the 2016 AFC U-19 Championship, thus qualified for the 2017 FIFA U-20 World Cup. Later, he was included in Vietnam U20's squad for the 2017 FIFA U-20 World Cup.

He featured in Vietnam national team's squad for the AFC Asian Cup in the 2019 and 2023 editions.

== Career statistics ==
=== International ===
As of 26 March 2024

Vietnam
Year	Apps	Goals
2021	8	1
2022	9	3
2023	5	0
2024	4	0
Total	26	4

=== International goals ===
No.	Date	Venue	Opponent	Score	Result	Competition
1.	7 October 2021	Sharjah Stadium, Sharjah, United Arab Emirates	China	1–2	2–3	2022 FIFA World Cup qualification
2.	1 February 2022	Mỹ Đình National Stadium, Hanoi, Vietnam	China	1–0	3–1	2022 FIFA World Cup qualification
3.	21 September 2022	Thống Nhất Stadium, Hồ Chí Minh City, Vietnam	Singapore	3–0	4–0	2022 VFF Tri-Nations Series
4.	21 December 2022	New Laos National Stadium, Vientiane, Laos	Laos	3–0	6–0	2022 AFF Championship

== Honours ==
Becamex Bình Dương

- Vietnamese National Cup: 2018

Công An Hà Nội

- V.League 1: 2023

Vietnam U23/Olympic

- SEA Games gold medal: 2019

Vietnam

- ASEAN Championship: 2024
- VFF Cup: 2022
