= Bordin Phala =

Thai footballer

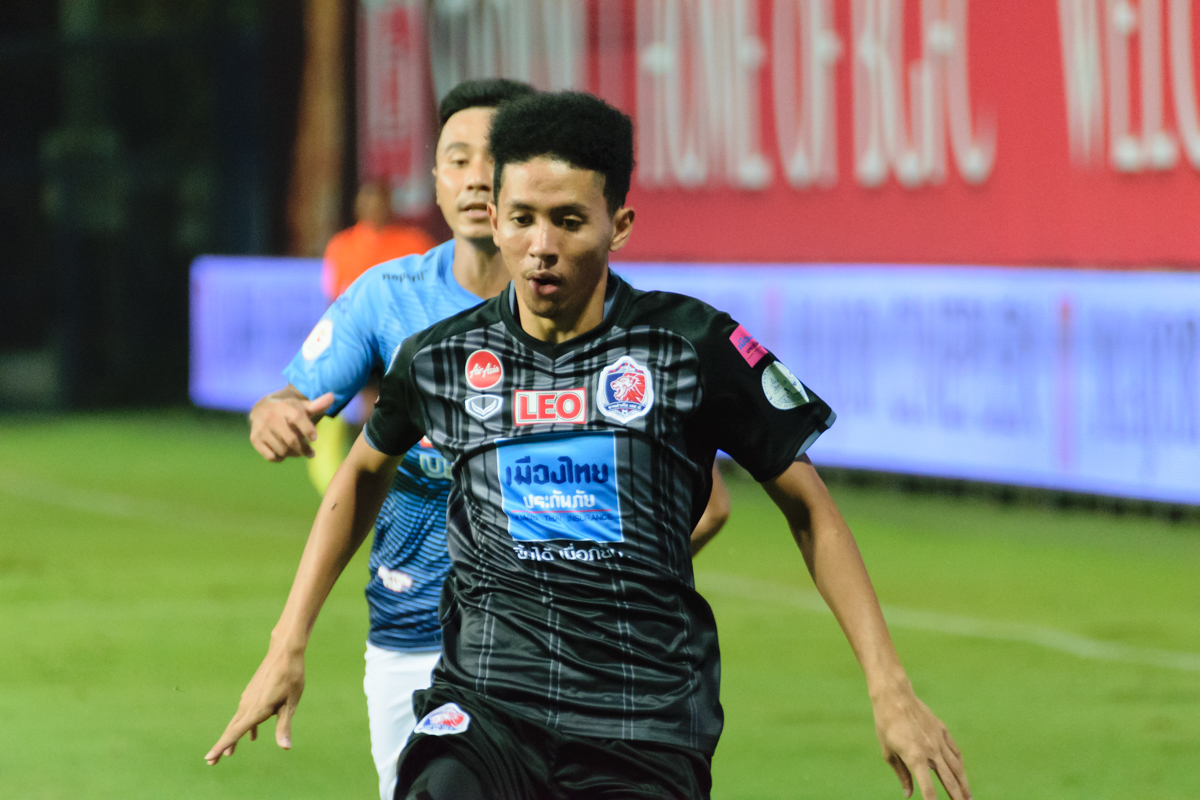
- Phala playing for Port in 2018

Personal information
- Full name: Bordin Phala
- Date of birth: 18 December 1994 (age 31)
- Place of birth: Ubon Ratchathani, Thailand
- Height: 1.82 m (6 ft 0 in)
- Position: Winger

Team information
- Current team: Port
- Number: 10

Youth career
- 2007–2010: Benchama Maharat School
- 2010–2013: Wat Suthiwararam School
- 2013: Port Futsal Club

Senior career*
Years	Team	Apps	(Gls)
2014–2016	Bangkok Glass	50	(7)
2016	Chiangrai United	13	(2)
2017	Buriram United	18	(1)
2018–	Port	177	(31)

International career^{‡}
2016–2024	Thailand	41	(6)
Medal record
Thailand
Asean Football Championship
Winner	AFF Suzuki Cup 2020	2020
Winner	AFF Mitsubishi Electric Cup 2022	2022
- * Club domestic league appearances and goals as of 27 August 2024 ‡ National team caps and goals as of 21 January 2024

Bordin Phala (Thai: บดินทร์ ผาลา, born 18 December 1994) is a Thai professional footballer who plays as a winger for Thai League 1 club Port and the Thailand national team.

== International career ==
In 2021, he was called up by Alexandré Pölking to play for Thailand at the 2020 AFF Championship. He scored in the 1st leg final against Indonesia.

== Career statistics ==
=== International ===
As of 21 January 2024

National team	Year	Apps	Goals
Thailand	2016	0	0
Thailand	2017	4	0
Thailand	2018	2	0
Thailand	2019	3	0
Thailand	2021	5	1
Thailand	2022	13	3
Thailand	2023	11	2
Thailand	2024	3	0
Thailand	Total	41	6

==== International goals ====
Scores and results list Thailand's goal tally first.

No.	Date	Venue	Opponent	Score	Result	Competition
1.	29 December 2021	National Stadium, Kallang, Singapore	Indonesia	4–0	4–0	2020 AFF Championship
2.	27 March 2022	BG Stadium, Pathum Thani, Thailand	Suriname	1–0	1–0	Friendly
3.	11 December 2022	Thammasat Stadium, Pathum Thani, Thailand	Myanmar	2–0	6–0	Friendly
4.	20 December 2022	Kuala Lumpur Stadium, Kuala Lumpur, Malaysia	Brunei	1–0	5–0	2022 AFF Championship
5.	10 January 2023	Thammasat Stadium, Pathum Thani, Thailand	Malaysia	2–0	3–0	2022 AFF Championship
6.	10 September 2023	700th Anniversary Stadium, Chiang Mai, Thailand	Iraq	2–2	2–2	2023 King's Cup

== Honours ==
Bangkok Glass

- Thai FA Cup (1): 2014

Buriram United

- Thai League 1 (1): 2017

Port

- Thai FA Cup (1): 2019
- Thai League Cup (1): 2025–26
- Piala Presiden (1): 2025

Thailand

- AFF Championship (2): 2020, 2022
- King's Cup (2): 2016, 2017

Individual

- Piala Presiden Best Player: 2025
