= Suphanan Bureerat =

Thai footballer (born 1993)

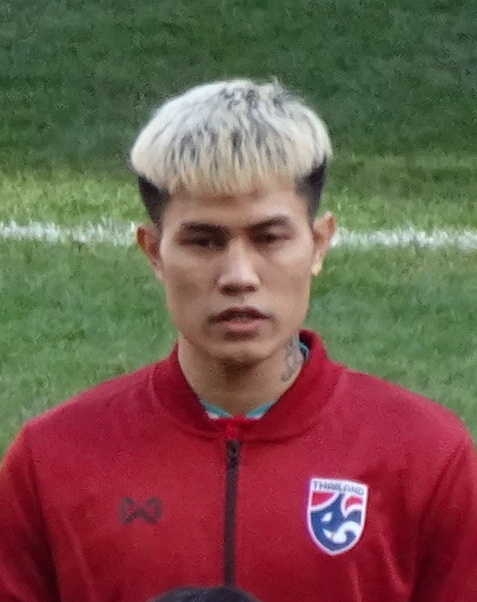
- Suphanan in 2024

Personal information
- Full name: Suphanan Bureerat
- Date of birth: 10 December 1993 (age 32)
- Place of birth: Chanthaburi, Thailand
- Height: 1.77 m (5 ft 10 in)
- Position: Right-back

Team information
- Current team: Port
- Number: 4

Youth career
- 2005–2009: JMG Academy
- 2010: Muangthong United

Senior career*
Years	Team	Apps	(Gls)
2010–2017	Muangthong United	0	(0)
2011	→ Air Force Central (loan)	12	(0)
2012	→ Nakhon Nayok (loan)	19	(0)
2012	→ Chanthaburi (loan)	10	(0)
2013	→ TTM Customs (loan)	16	(0)
2015–2017	→ Pattaya United (loan)	57	(5)
2018	Pattaya United	22	(1)
2019–2022	Samut Prakan City	55	(3)
2019	→ Muangthong United (loan)	27	(1)
2022–	Port	87	(7)

International career^{‡}
2022–	Thailand	42	(3)
Medal record
Men's football
Representing Thailand
FIFA ASEAN Cup
Runner-up	2026 Indonesia	Team
ASEAN Championship
Winner	Mitsubishi Electric Cup 2022	Team
Runner-up	Mitsubishi Electric Cup 2024	Team
- * Club domestic league appearances and goals as of 24 October 2025 ‡ National team caps and goals as of 5 October 2026

Suphanan Bureerat (Thai: ศุภนันท์ บุรีรัตน์, born 10 December 1993) is a Thai professional footballer who plays as a right-back for Thai League 1 club Port and the Thailand national team.

== International career ==
In 2022, he was called up for the 2022 AFF Championship by head coach Alexandré Pölking.

=== International goals ===
Scores and results list Thailand's goal tally first.

No	Date	Venue	Opponent	Score	Result	Competition
1.	26 December 2022	Thammasat Stadium, Pathum Thani, Thailand	Philippines	4–0	4–0	2022 AFF Championship
2.	27 December 2024	Rizal Memorial Stadium, Manila, Philippines	Philippines	1–1	1–2	2024 ASEAN Championship
3.	31 March 2026	Rajamangala Stadium, Bangkok, Thailand	Turkmenistan	1–0	2–1	2027 AFC Asian Cup qualification

== Honours ==
=== Club ===
Port

- Thai League Cup: 2025–26
- Piala Presiden: 2025

=== International ===
Thailand

- AFF Championship (1): 2022
- King's Cup: 2024, 2026

Individual

- Thai League 1 Team of the Season: 2025–26
