= Nguyễn Văn Toàn (footballer, born 1996) =

Vietnamese footballer (born 1996)

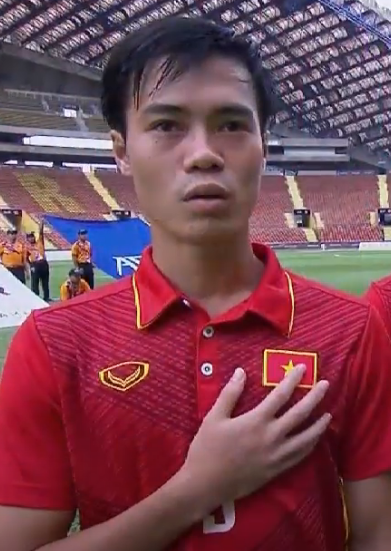
- Nguyễn Văn Toàn with Vietnam U22 at the 2017 SEA Games

Personal information
- Full name: Nguyễn Văn Toàn
- Date of birth: 12 April 1996 (age 30)
- Place of birth: Hải Dương, Vietnam
- Height: 1.71 m (5 ft 7 in)
- Positions: Forward; winger

Team information
- Current team: Thép Xanh Nam Định
- Number: 9

Youth career
- 2007–2014: Hoàng Anh Gia Lai

Senior career*
Years	Team	Apps	(Gls)
2015–2022	Hoàng Anh Gia Lai	177	(46)
2022–2023	Seoul E-Land	9	(0)
2023–	Thép Xanh Nam Định	39	(8)

International career^{‡}
2013–2014	Vietnam U19	12	(13)
2017–2018	Vietnam U22	6	(1)
2015–2019	Vietnam U23	34	(4)
2016–	Vietnam	68	(8)
Medal record
Men's football
Representing Vietnam
AFF U-19 Youth Championship
Runner-up	Indonesia 2013
Runner-up	Vietnam 2014
SEA Games
Bronze medal – third place	Singapore 2015	Team
AFC U-23 Championship
Runner-up	China 2018
ASEAN Championship
Winner	ASEAN 2018	Team
Runner-up	ASEAN 2022	Team
Winner	ASEAN 2024	Team
- * Club domestic league appearances and goals as of 7 June 2026 ‡ National team caps and goals as of 9 December 2024

Nguyễn Văn Toàn (born 12 April 1996) is a Vietnamese professional footballer who plays as a forward or a winger for V.League 1 club Thép Xanh Nam Định and the Vietnam national team.

Nguyễn Văn Toàn joined Hoang Anh Gia Lai–Arsenal JMG Academy in 2007. He made his first-team debut for HAGL against Khanh Hoa in January 2015.

Văn Toàn made his senior international debut for Vietnam in 2016 sat age 20, and has since earned over 64 caps as of October 2024.

== Club career ==
=== Hoàng Anh Gia Lai ===
Văn Toàn made his debut for Hoàng Anh Gia Lai on 4 January 2015, coming on as a second–half substitute in a 4–2 home win over Sanna Khanh Hoa in V.League 1. In the 2019 season, he scored 9 goals and had 11 assists, which made him the top assist provider of the league. As the result, he was named in the league's Team of the season for the first time in his career.

=== Seoul E-Land FC ===
On 4 January 2023, Văn Toàn joined K League 2 side Seoul E-Land. On 1 March, he was part of the starting lineup in a K2 League match against Chungbuk Cheongju, his first ever league appearance.

=== Thép Xanh Nam Định ===
On 20 September 2023, Văn Toàn returned to Vietnam and joined V.League 1 club Thép Xanh Nam Định. In the 2023–24 season, he was part of Nam Định's squad that won the V.League 1 title. As the team's starter right winger, he scored 5 goals and assisted twice in the league during the season, and was named in the league's Team of the season.

== International career ==
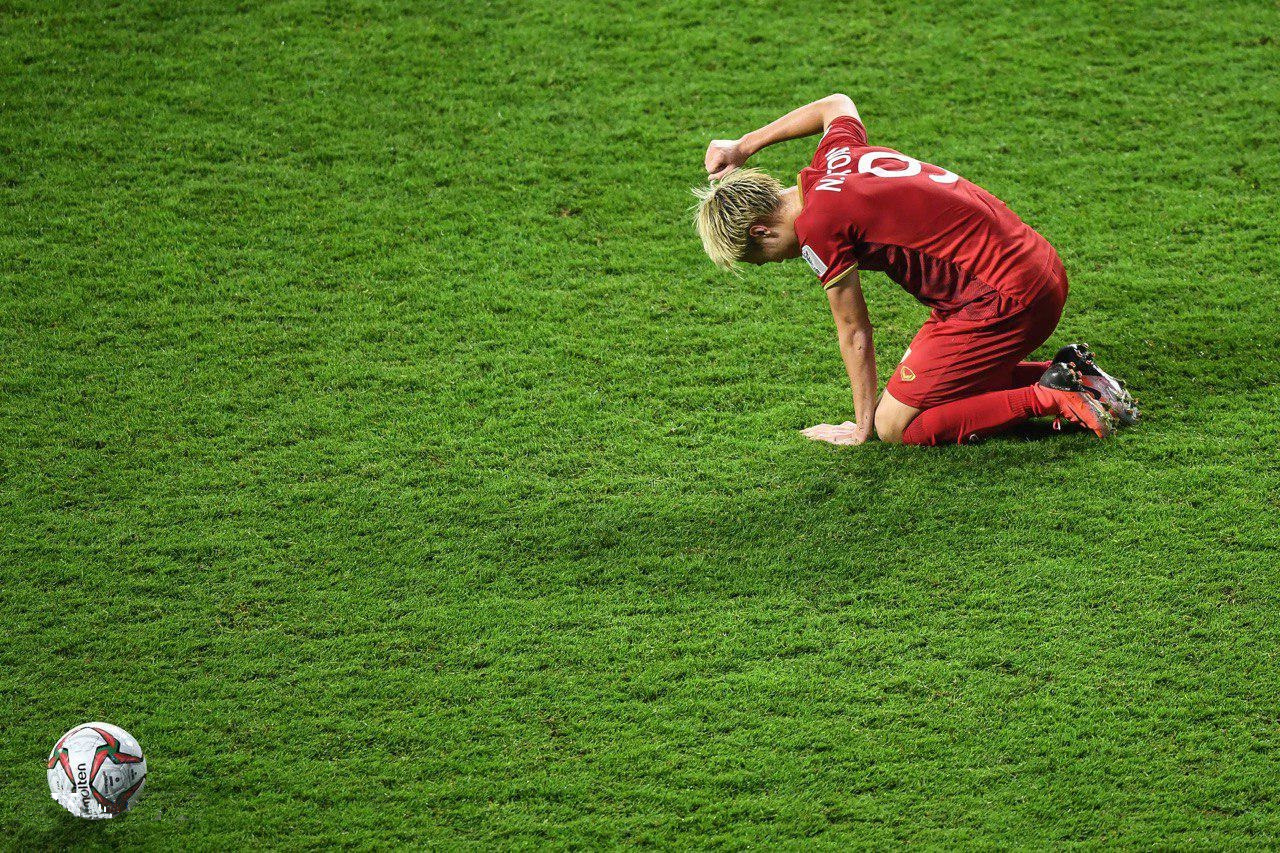
Nguyễn Văn Toàn's frusttration after Vietnam's defeat against Japan in the 2019 AFC Asian Cup quarter-finals.

Văn Toàn made his international debut for Vietnam against Chinese Taipei on 24 March 2016 and scored a brace in a 4–1 win.

Văn Toàn has represented Vietnam in the 2019 and the 2023 AFC Asian Cup. He has also played in the 2016, 2018, 2020, 2022 and the 2024 ASEAN Championship in which he won the 2018 and 2024 edition.

== Career statistics ==
=== International ===
Appearances and goals by national team and year
National team	Year	Apps	Goals
Vietnam	2016	12	3
Vietnam	2017	3	1
Vietnam	2018	1	0
Vietnam	2019	11	0
Vietnam	2021	15	0
Vietnam	2022	6	2
Vietnam	2023	10	1
Vietnam	2024	10	1
Vietnam	Total	68	8

== International goals ==
Vietnam U19

#	Date	Venue	Opponent	Score	Result	Competition
1.	10 September 2013	Gresik, Petrokimia Stadium	Thailand	2–1	3–2	2013 AFF U-19 Youth Championship
2.	10 September 2013	Gresik, Petrokimia Stadium	Thailand	3–1	3–2	2013 AFF U-19 Youth Championship
3.	14 September 2013	Gresik, Petrokimia Stadium	Indonesia	2–1	2–1	2013 AFF U-19 Youth Championship
4.	16 September 2013	Gresik, Petrokimia Stadium	Myanmar	1–0	3–1	2014 AFC U-19 Championship qualification
5.	16 September 2013	Gresik, Petrokimia Stadium	Myanmar	2–0	3–1	2014 AFC U-19 Championship qualification
6.	16 September 2013	Gresik, Petrokimia Stadium	Myanmar	3–1	3–1	2014 AFC U-19 Championship qualification
7.	3 October 2013	Kuala Lumpur, KLFA Stadium	Chinese Taipei	2–0	6–1	2014 AFC U-19 Championship qualification
8.	3 October 2013	Kuala Lumpur, KLFA Stadium	Chinese Taipei	5–1	6–1	2014 AFC U-19 Championship qualification
9.	5 October 2013	Kuala Lumpur, KLFA Stadium	Hong Kong	2–0	5–1	2014 AFC U-19 Championship qualification
10.	7 October 2013	Kuala Lumpur, KLFA Stadium	Australia	3–0	5–1	2014 AFC U-19 Championship qualification
11.	9 August 2014	Bandar Seri Begawan, Track & Field Sports Complex	Singapore	4–0	4–0	2014 Hassanal Bolkiah Trophy
12.	9 September 2014	Hà Nội, Mỹ Đình National Stadium	Japan	1–0	2–3	2014 AFF U-19 Youth Championship
13.	11 September 2014	Hà Nội, Mỹ Đình National Stadium	Myanmar	3–0	4–1	2014 AFF U-19 Youth Championship

Vietnam U23

#	Date	Venue	Opponent	Score	Result	Competition
1.	2 June 2015	Bishan, Bishan Stadium	Malaysia	4–1	5–1	2015 Southeast Asian Games
2.	21 July 2017	Ho Chi Minh City, Thống Nhất Stadium	Macau	2–0	8–1	2018 AFC U-23 Championship qualification
3.	21 July 2017	Ho Chi Minh City, Thống Nhất Stadium	Macau	8–1	8–1	2018 AFC U-23 Championship qualification
4.	20 August 2017	Shah Alam, Shah Alam Stadium	Philippines	3–0	4–0	2017 Southeast Asian Games

Vietnam Olympic

#	Date	Venue	Opponent	Score	Result	Competition
1.	27 August 2018	Bekasi, Indonesia	Syria	1–0	1–0	2018 Asian Games

Vietnam

No.	Date	Venue	Opponent	Score	Result	Competition
1.	24 March 2016	Mỹ Đình National Stadium, Hanoi, Vietnam	Chinese Taipei	2–1	4–1	2018 FIFA World Cup qualification
2.	24 March 2016	Mỹ Đình National Stadium, Hanoi, Vietnam	Chinese Taipei	3–1	4–1	2018 FIFA World Cup qualification
3.	8 November 2016	Mỹ Đình National Stadium, Hanoi, Vietnam	Indonesia	3–2	3–2	Friendly
4.	28 March 2017	Central Republican Stadium, Dushanbe, Tajikistan	Afghanistan	1–0	1–1	2019 AFC Asian Cup qualification
5.	27 September 2022	Thống Nhất Stadium, Ho Chi Minh City, Vietnam	India	2–0	3–0	2022 VFF Tri-Nations Series
6.	21 December 2022	New Laos National Stadium, Vientiane, Laos	Laos	5–0	6–0	2022 AFF Championship
7.	16 November 2023	Rizal Memorial Stadium, Manila, Philippines	Philippines	1–0	2–0	2026 FIFA World Cup qualification
8.	9 December 2024	New Laos National Stadium, Vientiane, Laos	Laos	3–0	4–1	2024 ASEAN Championship

== Honours ==
Thép Xanh Nam Định

- V.League 1: 2023–24, 2024–25
- Vietnamese Super Cup: 2024

Vietnam U23

- VFF Cup: 2018

Vietnam

- ASEAN Championship: 2018, 2024; runner-up: 2022
- VFF Cup: 2022

Individual

- AFF U-19 Youth Championship Top goalscorer: 2013
- V.League 1 top assist provider: 2019, 2020
