= Đỗ Hùng Dũng =

Vietnamese footballer (born 1993)

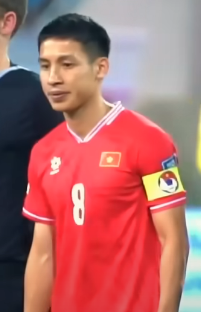
- Hùng Dũng playing for Vietnam in 2024

Personal information
- Full name: Đỗ Hùng Dũng
- Date of birth: 8 September 1993 (age 33)
- Place of birth: Gia Lâm, Hanoi, Vietnam
- Height: 1.70 m (5 ft 7 in)
- Position: Midfielder

Team information
- Current team: Hà Nội
- Number: 88

Youth career
- 2004–2009: Hà Nội Football Training Center
- 2009–2011: Bắc Ninh
- 2011–2014: Hà Nội T&T

Senior career*
Years	Team	Apps	(Gls)
2016–	Hà Nội	237	(21)
2014–2015	→ Hà Nội (2011) (loan)	20	(3)

International career^{‡}
2011–2012	Vietnam U19	5	(0)
2015–2016	Vietnam U23	5	(0)
2018	Vietnam Olympic	4	(0)
2019	Vietnam U22 (wildcard)	6	(2)
2022	Vietnam U23 (wildcard)	6	(2)
2018–2024	Vietnam	45	(1)
Medal record
Men's football
Representing Vietnam
AFF Championship
Winner	ASEAN 2018
Runner-up	ASEAN 2022
SEA Games
Gold medal – first place	Manila 2019	Team
Gold medal – first place	Hanoi 2021	Team
- * Club domestic league appearances and goals as of 21 November 2026 ‡ National team caps and goals as of 26 March 2024

Đỗ Hùng Dũng (IPA: [ɗŏˀ hùŋm zŭˀŋm], born 8 September 1993) is a Vietnamese professional footballer who plays as a midfielder for V.League 1 club Hà Nội.

== Early life ==
Đỗ Hùng Dũng was born in Yên Viên town, Hanoi, Vietnam. When he was 9 years old, Hùng Dũng showed early signs of his talent for playing football. However, his father repeatedly opposed his decision to pursue a career as a footballer. Despite this, Hùng Dũng's mother supported his dream. Eventually, with the consent of his entire family, he joined the Hanoi talent class.

== Club career ==
=== Hà Nội ===
Hùng Dũng was associated with the Hà Nội T&T from the age of 17 after attending the club's development center in Gia Lam. In 2014, he joined V.League 2 club Hà Nội (which later become Sài Gòn) on a long term loan deal. After two seasons in V.League 2, Hùng Dũng returned to Hà Nội in V.League 1. In his first two seasons with Hà Nội, he appeared in all possible games for the club.

In the 2017 AFC Cup, Hùng Dũng scored 4 goals, becoming the second-highest scoring player for Hà Nội in the tournament after Văn Quyết. He was selected by sports website Fox Sports to the 2017 AFC Cup ASEAN Zonal Team of the Group Stage.

At the 2019 AFC Cup group stage, Hà Nội set a new record for the biggest win in the tournament's history by thrashing Nagaworld 10–0. Đỗ Hùng Dũng scored the goal that made it 5–0 in this historic victory.

On 11 December 2023, Hùng Dũng signed a contract extension, keeping him at Hà Nội until 2026.

== International career ==
=== Youth ===
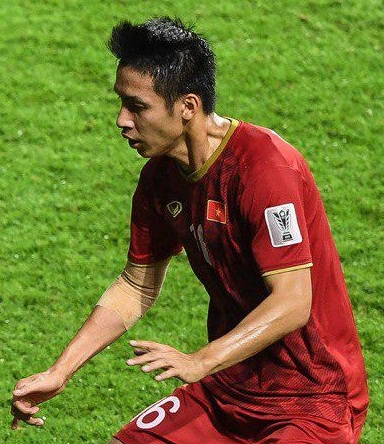
Hùng Dũng playing for Vietnam at the 2019 AFC Asian Cup

In 2012, Hùng Dũng was called up by coach Hoàng Văn Phúc to join the Vietnam U-19 team to participate in the 2012 AFC U-19 Championship.

In 2014, Hùng Dũng was named by head coach Toshiya Miura in Vietnam U-23's preliminary squad for the 2014 Asian Games, but did not make the final cut. He was later named in the squad for the 2016 AFC U-23 Championship qualification.

Hùng Dũng was selected as Vietnam U-23's over-age player for the 2019 and 2021 SEA Games, winning the gold medal in both editions.

=== Senior ===
Hùng Dũng made his debut for Vietnam national team in October 2018. Later in the year, he featured in the 2018 AFF Championship with the team and appeared in both legs of the final was Vietnam win their second AFF Championship title. He then participated in the 2019 Asian Cup and reached the quarter-finals with Vietnam.

In January 2024, Hùng Dũng captained Vietnam in the 2023 Asian Cup.

== Personal life ==
Hùng Dũng married Triệu Mộc Trinh on 24 April 2019. On 29 October 2019, the couple had their first child, a son named Gia Bao.

== Career statistics ==
=== Club ===
As of match played 21 November 2026

Appearances and goals by club, season and competition
Club	Season	League			National cup		Continental		Other		Total	
Club	Season	Division	Apps	Goals	Apps	Goals	Apps	Goals	Apps	Goals	Apps	Goals
Hà Nội (2011)	2014	V.League 2	6	0	1	0	—		—		7	0
Hà Nội (2011)	2015	V.League 2	14	3	1	0	—		—		15	3
Hà Nội (2011)	Total		20	3	2	0	0	0	0	0	22	3
Hà Nội	2016	V.League 1	26	4	7	1	2 (Note: Appearance(s) in AFC Champions League)	0	1 (Note: Appearance in Vietnamese Super Cup)	0	36	5
Hà Nội	2017	V.League 1	26	3	1	0	7 (Note: One appearance in AFC Champions League; six appearances and four goals in AFC Cup)	4	1	0	35	7
Hà Nội	2018	V.League 1	20	2	5	2	—		—		25	4
Hà Nội	2019	V.League 1	25	3	4	0	15 (Note: Two appearances in AFC Champions League, thirteenth appearances and one goal in AFC Cup)	1	1	0	45	4
Hà Nội	2020	V.League 1	20	2	4	1	—		1	0	25	3
Hà Nội	2021	V.League 1	4	1	0	0	—		1	0	5	1
Hà Nội	2022	V.League 1	23	1	5	0	—		—		28	1
Hà Nội	2023	V.League 1	16	1	1	0	—		1	0	18	1
Hà Nội	2023–24	V.League 1	21	2	4	0	6	0	—		31	2
Hà Nội	2024–25	V.League 1	26	0	1	0	—		—		27	0
Hà Nội	2025–26	V.League 1	22	2	1	0	—		—		23	2
Hà Nội	2026–27	V.League 1	8	0	1	0	—		—		9	0
Hà Nội	Total		237	21	34	4	30	5	6	0	307	30
Total career			257	24	36	4	30	5	6	0	329	33

=== International ===
As of match played 10 September 2023

Appearances and goals by national team and year
National team	Year	Apps	Goals
Vietnam
Vietnam	2018	8	0
Vietnam	2019	11	0
Vietnam	2021	0	0
Vietnam	2022	9	1
Vietnam	2023	9	0
Vietnam	2024	8	0
Total		45	1

=== International goals ===
Vietnam U23

#	Date	Venue	Opponent	Score	Result	Competition
1.	28 November 2019	Biñan, Laguna, Philippines	Laos	4–0	6-1	2019 Southeast Asian Games
2.	10 December 2019	Rizal Memorial Stadium, Manila, Philippines	Indonesia	2–0	3-0	2019 Southeast Asian Games
3.	6 May 2022	Việt Trì Stadium, Phú Thọ, Vietnam	Indonesia	2–0	3–0	2021 Southeast Asian Games
4.	13 May 2022	Việt Trì Stadium, Phú Thọ, Vietnam	Myanmar	1–0	1–0	2021 Southeast Asian Games

Vietnam

#	Date	Venue	Opponent	Score	Result	Competition
1.	21 December 2022	New Laos National Stadium, Vientiane, Laos	Laos	2–0	6-0	2022 AFF Championship

== Honours ==
Hà Nội (2011)

- V.League 2: 2015

Hà Nội

- V.League 1: 2016, 2018, 2019, 2022
- Vietnamese National Cup: 2019, 2020, 2022; runner-up: 2016
- Vietnamese Super Cup: 2019, 2020, 2021; runner-up: 2016, 2017

Vietnam U23/Olympic

- SEA Games: 2019, 2021
- Asian Games fourth place: 2018
- VFF Cup: 2018

Vietnam

- AFF Championship: 2018; runner-up: 2022
- VFF Cup: 2022
- King's Cup runner-up: 2019

Individual

- Vietnamese Golden Ball: 2019
