= Peeradol Chamrasamee =

Thai footballer

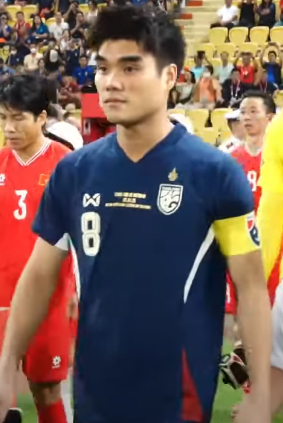
- Peeradol captaining Thailand in the 2024 ASEAN Championship final

Personal information
- Full name: Peeradol Chamrasamee
- Date of birth: 15 September 1992 (age 34)
- Place of birth: Bangkok, Thailand
- Height: 1.73 m (5 ft 8 in)
- Position: Midfielder

Team information
- Current team: Port
- Number: 5

Youth career
- 2009–2011: Debsirin School

Senior career*
Years	Team	Apps	(Gls)
2012–2015	Chamchuri United	38	(6)
2015–2017	Muangthong United	7	(1)
2016–2017	→ Pattaya United (loan)	30	(7)
2017–2018	Pattaya United	8	(1)
2018–2021	Samut Prakan City	47	(5)
2021–2024	Buriram United	69	(11)
2024–	Port	40	(9)

International career^{‡}
2010	Thailand U19	3	(0)
2013	Thailand U23	5	(2)
2017–	Thailand	44	(5)
Medal record
Men's football
Representing Thailand
FIFA ASEAN Cup
Runner-up	2026 Indonesia	Team
ASEAN Championship
Winner	ASEAN 2022	Team
Runner-up	ASEAN 2024	Team
- * Club domestic league appearances and goals as of 7 December 2025 ‡ National team caps and goals as of 5 October 2026

Peeradol Chamrasamee (Thai: พีรดนย์ ฉ่ำรัศมี, born 15 September 1992) is a Thai professional footballer who plays as a midfielder for Thai League 1 club Port and the Thailand national team.

== Club career ==
Peeradol is a son of Prapas Chamrasamee, a former national team footballer in the 1980s and 1990s. He began playing football at the academy of Port, where his father was a coach, and played competitively for Debsirin School, representing the school twice in the Jaturamitr Samakkee competition. After graduating school, he was admitted to Chulalongkorn University on a sports quota and played for Chamchuri United in the Second Division.

He was then signed to Muangthong United, but made few appearances and was loaned to Pattaya United in the First Division in 2015 and 2017, before making the transfer the following season (the club was then renamed to Samut Prakan City). He transferred to Buriram United for the 2021/22 season, then to Port in 2024.

== International career ==
Peeradol was first called up to the national team by coach Milovan Rajevac for a friendly with Uzbekistan in 2017, and remained on the roster for the 2018 World Cup qualification and the 2017 King's Cup. He was again called up for the AFF Championship in 2022 and 2024, serving as team captain for the 2024 tournament.

== International goals ==
No.	Date	Venue	Opponent	Score	Result	Competition
1.	20 December 2022	Kuala Lumpur Stadium, Kuala Lumpur, Malaysia	Brunei	4–0	5–0	2022 AFF Championship
2.	20 December 2022	Kuala Lumpur Stadium, Kuala Lumpur, Malaysia	Brunei	5–0	5–0	2022 AFF Championship
3.	17 December 2024	National Stadium, Kallang, Singapore	Singapore	3–2	4–2	2024 ASEAN Championship
4.	30 December 2024	Rajamangala Stadium, Bangkok, Thailand	Philippines	1–0	3–1	2024 ASEAN Championship
5.	5 October 2026	Gelora Bung Karno Stadium, Jakarta, Indonesia	Indonesia	2–1	2–2 (a.e.t.) (2–4 p)	2026 FIFA ASEAN Cup

== Honours ==
Muangthong United

- Thai League 1: 2016
- Thai League Cup: 2016

Buriram United

- Thai League 1: 2021–22, 2022–23, 2023–24
- Thai FA Cup: 2021–22, 2022–23
- Thai League Cup: 2021–22, 2022–23

Port

- Thai League Cup: 2025–26
- Piala Presiden: 2025

ASEAN All-Stars

- Maybank Challenge Cup: 2025

Thailand

- AFF Championship: 2022
- King's Cup: 2017

Individual

- ASEAN All-Stars: 2025
- Thai League 1 Team of the Season: 2025–26
