= 2022 AFF Championship =

Tournament details
- Dates: 20 December 2022 – 16 January 2023
- Teams: 10 (from 1 sub-confederation)
- Venues: 10 (in 9 host cities)

Final positions
- Champions: Thailand (7th title)
- Runners-up: Vietnam

Tournament statistics
- Matches played: 26
- Goals scored: 90 (3.46 per match)
- Attendance: 479,571 (18,445 per match)
- Top scorer(s): (Thailand) Teerasil Dangda (Vietnam) Nguyễn Tiến Linh (6 goals each)
- Best player: (Thailand) Theerathon Bunmathan
- Best young player: (Indonesia) Marselino Ferdinan
- Fair play award: Malaysia

The 2022 AFF Championship (officially AFF Mitsubishi Electric Cup 2022 due to sponsorship reasons) was the 14th edition of the AFF Championship, the football championship of nations affiliated to the ASEAN Football Federation (AFF) and was the 1st edition under the name AFF Mitsubishi Electric Cup.

The tournament returned to its usual two-year cycle, after the 2020 AFF Championship was postponed to 2021 due to the COVID-19 pandemic.

The final tournament ran from 20 December 2022 to 16 January 2023.

Thailand were the defending champions, and won the tournament by a 3–2 aggregate score in the two-legged final against its rivals, Vietnam to secure their seventh title. Alexandré Pölking, became the 4th coach to win multiple titles, the first being on the 2020 edition.

== Format ==
The AFF Mitsubishi Electric Cup 2022 followed the 2018 format, a change from the 2020 format with a centralised venue due to the COVID-19 pandemic in Southeast Asia.

In the current format, the nine highest-ranked teams automatically qualified with the 10th and 11th ranked teams playing in a two-legged qualifier. The 10 teams were split in two groups of five and play a round-robin system, with each team playing two home and two away fixtures. Away goals rule was applied after 90 minutes, but not in extra-time.

A draw was made to determine where the teams play while the format of the knockout round remained unchanged.

== Qualification ==
Nine teams automatically qualified to the AFF Championship final tournament; they were separated into their respective pots based on their performance in the last two editions.

Brunei and Timor-Leste, the two lowest-ranked teams, played a two-legged tie to determine the tenth and final qualifier in November 2022, with Brunei hosting both legs due to Timor-Leste lacking a FIFA-standard venue. Brunei secured qualification, and their second appearance in the tournament after 26 years, by defeating Timor-Leste 6–3 on aggregate, thus ensuring all ten ASEAN members had their respective teams in the competition.

Australia, a member since 2013, did not enter the tournament.

Team	Appearance	Previous best performance
Brunei	2nd	Group stage (1996)
Cambodia	9th	Group stage (1996, 2000, 2002, 2004, 2008, 2016, 2018, 2020)
Indonesia	14th	Runners-up (2000, 2002, 2004, 2010, 2016, 2020)
Laos	13th	Group stage (1996, 1998, 2000, 2002, 2004, 2007, 2008, 2010, 2012, 2014, 2018, 2020)
Malaysia	14th	Winners (2010)
Myanmar	14th	Fourth place (2004), Semi-finalists (2016)
Philippines	13th	Semi-finalists (2010, 2012, 2014, 2018)
Singapore	14th	Winners (1998, 2004, 2007, 2012)
Thailand	14th	Winners (1996, 2000, 2002, 2014, 2016, 2020)
Vietnam	14th	Winners (2008, 2018)

== Draw ==
The draw for the 2022 AFF Championship was held on 30 August 2022 in Bangkok, Thailand at 14:00 (GMT+07:00). The pot placements followed each teams' progress based on the two previous editions. If the results were equal, the most recent tournament was given priority.

At the time of the draw, the identity of the team that secured qualification was unknown and was automatically placed into Pot 5. Brunei qualified for the final tournament by defeating Timor-Leste.

Ranking in the two previous tournaments
Pot	Team	2020	2018	AVG
1	Thailand	1	3	2
1	Vietnam	3	1	2
2	Malaysia	6	2	4
2	Indonesia	2	7	4.5
3	Singapore	4	5	4.5
3	Philippines	5	4	4.5
4	Myanmar	8	5	6.5
4	Cambodia	7	8	7.5
5	Laos	9	9	9
5	Brunei	NQ	NQ	n/a

== Squads ==
Each team was allowed a preliminary squad of 50 players. A final squad of 23 players (three of whom had to be goalkeepers) needed to be registered.

== Officials ==
The following officials were chosen for the competition.

Referees

- (Chinese Taipei) Chen Hsin-chuan
- (Hong Kong) Tam Ping Wun
- (Japan) Yusuke Araki
- (Japan) Jumpei Iida
- (Japan) Hiroki Kasahara
- (Japan) Ryuji Sato
- (Japan) Yudai Yamamoto
- (Jordan) Adham Makhadmeh
- (Jordan) Ahmed Faisal Al Ali
- (Oman) Omar Al-Yaqoubi
- (Saudi Arabia) Mohammed Al Hoaish
- (Saudi Arabia) Majed Al-Shamrani
- (South Korea) Choi Hyun-jai
- (South Korea) Kim Dae-yong
- (South Korea) Kim Hee-gon
- (South Korea) Kim Jong-hyeok
- (South Korea) Ko Hyung-jin - Final (Second leg) Thailand - Vietnam
- (United Arab Emirates) Omar Mohamed Al Ali
- (Uzbekistan) Aziz Asimov

Assistant referees

- (Brunei) Mohammad Faisal Ali
- (Taiwan) Chen Hsiao-en
- (Hong Kong) So Kai Man
- (Indonesia) Nurhadi Sulchan
- (Indonesia) Bambang Syamsudar
- (Japan) Yusuke Hamamoto
- (Japan) Jun Mihara
- (Japan) Isao Nishihashi
- (Japan) Takumi Takagi
- (Japan) Yosuke Takebe
- (Japan) Kota Watanabe
- (Jordan) Hamza Adel Abu Obaid
- (Jordan) Mohammad Al Kalaf
- (Jordan) Ahmad Al Roalleh
- (Jordan) Ahmad Mansour Samara Muhsen
- (South Korea) Bang Ki-yeol
- (South Korea) Jang Jong-pil
- (South Korea) Kang Dong-ho
- (South Korea) Kwak Seung-soon
- (South Korea) Park Kyun-yong
- (South Korea) Park Sang-jun
- (South Korea) Song Bong-keun
- (Saudi Arabia) Omar Ali Al Jamal
- (Saudi Arabia) Faisal Nasser Al Qahtani
- (Saudi Arabia) Abdulrahim Al Shammari
- (Saudi Arabia) Khalaf Zaid Al Shammari
- (Saudi Arabia) Fahad Awaiedh Al Umri
- (Laos) Kilar Ladsavong
- (Malaysia) Mohd Arif Shamil Abdul Rasid
- (Oman) Hamed Talib Al Ghafri
- (Qatar) Faisal Eid Alshammari
- (Qatar) Juma Al Burshaid
- (Qatar) Yousuf Al Shamari
- (Singapore) Ronnie Koh Min Kiat
- (Thailand) Apichit Nophuan
- (Thailand) Tanate Chuchuen
- (Thailand) Supawan Hinthong
- (Thailand) Pattarapong Kijsathit
- (United Arab Emirates) Jasem Abdulla Al Ali
- (Uzbekistan) Timur Gaynullin
- (Vietnam) Nguyễn Trung Hậu

Fourth officials

- (Brunei) Abdul Hakim Mohd Haidi
- (Cambodia) Chy Samdy
- (Indonesia) Thoriq Alkatiri
- (Laos) Xaypaseuth Phongsanit
- (Laos) Souei Vongkham
- (Malaysia) Yassin Tuan Mohd Hanafiah
- (Malaysia) Muhammad Usaid Jamal
- (Malaysia) Muhammad Nazmi Nasaruddin
- (Malaysia) Mohd Amirul Izwan Yaacob
- (Myanmar) Kyaw Zwall Lwin
- (Philippines) Clifford Daypuyat
- (Thailand) Songkran Bunmeekiart
- (Thailand) Pansa Chaisanit
- (Thailand) Mongkolchai Pechsri
- (Thailand) Sivakorn Pu-Udom
- (Thailand) Warintorn Sassadee
- (Thailand) Torphong Somsing
- (Singapore) Ahmad A'Qashah
- (Singapore) Muhammad Taqi Al Jaafari
- (Vietnam) Ngô Duy Lân

== Venues ==
There was one venue for each participating nation in the tournament, with each nation getting two group matches played in their home stadium. Brunei played their home matches at Malaysia's Kuala Lumpur Stadium as their own stadium did not meet tournament standards.

The Gelora Bung Karno Stadium operated at 70 percent capacity, at around 50,000 seats. The decision for a maximum attendance capacity of 70 percent was based on risk assessments and trials for future capacity expansion implementation.

(Malaysia) Kuala Lumpur		(Indonesia) Jakarta	(Cambodia) Phnom Penh
Bukit Jalil National Stadium	Kuala Lumpur Stadium (Note: Brunei played their home matches in Malaysia due to their stadium not meeting the tournament standards.)	Gelora Bung Karno Stadium	Morodok Techo National Stadium
Capacity: 87,411	Capacity: 18,000	Capacity: 77,193	Capacity: 60,000
(Vietnam) Hanoi	Location of stadiums of the 2022 AFF Championship		(Myanmar) Yangon
Mỹ Đình National Stadium	Location of stadiums of the 2022 AFF Championship		Thuwunna Stadium
Capacity: 40,192	Location of stadiums of the 2022 AFF Championship		Capacity: 32,000
(Thailand) Pathum Thani	(Laos) Vientiane	(Philippines) Manila	Singapore
Thammasat Stadium (Note: The venue of the Thailand's home matches was moved to Thammasat Stadium, as the Rajamangala Stadium was booked for two concert by Justin Bieber on November (then latter cancelled), Maroon 5 on December and the 37th Golden Disc Awards on January.)	New Laos National Stadium	Rizal Memorial Stadium	Jalan Besar Stadium (Note: The venue of the Singapore's two home matches was moved to Jalan Besar Stadium, as the National Stadium was booked for the "Carnival World Tour 2022" concert by Taiwanese singer Jay Chou on 17 and 18 December.)
Capacity: 25,000	Capacity: 25,000	Capacity: 12,000	Capacity: 6,000

== Group stage ==
Tiebreakers

Ranking in each group was determined as follows:

1. Greater number of points obtained in all the group matches;
2. Goal difference in all the group matches;
3. Greater number of goals scored in all the group matches.

If two or more teams were equal on the basis on the above three criteria, the placement was determined as follows:

1. Result of the direct match between the teams concerned;
2. Penalty shoot-out if only two teams were tied, and they met in the last round of the group;
3. Drawing of lots by the Organising Committee.

=== Group A ===
Pos	Team	Pld	W	D	L	GF	GA	GD	Pts	Qualification
1	Thailand	4	3	1	0	13	2	+11	10	Advance to knockout stage
2	Indonesia	4	3	1	0	12	3	+9	10	Advance to knockout stage
3	Cambodia	4	2	0	2	10	8	+2	6	
4	Philippines	4	1	0	3	8	10	−2	3	
5	Brunei	4	0	0	4	2	22	−20	0	Play qualification for the next edition

Source: AFF
20 December 2022
17:00 UTC+7

Cambodia	3–2	Philippines
Bunheing 16', 59'; Chanpolin 20'	Report (AFFMEC); Report (AFF)	Daniels 41', 55'

Morodok Techo National Stadium, Phnom Penh
Attendance: 4,860
Referee: Majed Al Shamrani (Saudi Arabia)
20 December 2022
20:30 UTC+8

Brunei	0–5	Thailand
	Report (AFFMEC); Report (AFF)	Bordin 19'; Teerasil 44'; Yura 88' (o.g.); Peeradon 90+1' (pen.), 90+3'

Kuala Lumpur Stadium, Kuala Lumpur (Malaysia)
Attendance: 480
Referee: Chen Hsin-chuan (Chinese Taipei)

23 December 2022
18:00 UTC+8

Philippines	5–1	Brunei
Daniels 7'; Reyes 12'; Melliza 50'; Rasmussen 51', 88'	Report (AFFMEC); Report (AFF)	Razimie 70'

Rizal Memorial Stadium, Manila
Attendance: 1,650
Referee: Tam Ping Wun (Hong Kong)
23 December 2022
16:30 UTC+7

Indonesia	2–1	Cambodia
Egy 7'; Witan 35'	Report (AFFMEC); Report (AFF)	Krya 16'

Gelora Bung Karno Stadium, Jakarta
Attendance: 25,332
Referee: Ryuji Sato (Japan)

26 December 2022
18:00 UTC+8

Brunei	0–7	Indonesia
	Report (AFFMEC); Report (AFF)	Syahrian 20'; Dendy 41'; Egy 59'; Spasojević 60'; Sananta 68'; Klok 86'; Sayuri 90+2'

Kuala Lumpur Stadium, Kuala Lumpur (Malaysia)
Attendance: 5,439
Referee: Kim Hee-gon (South Korea)
26 December 2022
19:30 UTC+7

Thailand	4–0	Philippines
Teerasil 3', 41' (pen.); Adisak 57'; Suphanan 63'	Report (AFFMEC); Report (AFF)

Thammasat Stadium, Pathum Thani
Attendance: 6,567
Referee: Yudai Yamamoto (Japan)

29 December 2022
17:00 UTC+7

Cambodia	5–1	Brunei
Chanchav 31'; Taylor 50' (pen.); Sokpheng 73' (pen.); Pisoth 80', 88'	Report (AFFMEC); Report (AFF)	Ikhwan 21'

Morodok Techo National Stadium, Phnom Penh
Attendance: 6,169
Referee: Choi Hyun-jai (South Korea)
29 December 2022
16:30 UTC+7

Indonesia	1–1	Thailand
Klok 50' (pen.)	Report (AFFMEC); Report (AFF)	Sarach 79'

Gelora Bung Karno Stadium, Jakarta
Attendance: 49,985
Referee: Mohammed Al Hoaish (Saudi Arabia)

2 January 2023
19:30 UTC+7

Thailand	3–1	Cambodia
Teerasil 45+2' (pen.), 90'; Sumanya 50'	Report (AFFMEC); Report (AFF)	Chanthea 68'

Thammasat Stadium, Pathum Thani
Attendance: 8,415
Referee: Omar Mohamed Al Ali (United Arab Emirates)
2 January 2023
20:30 UTC+8

Philippines	1–2	Indonesia
Rasmussen 83'	Report (AFFMEC); Report (AFF)	Dendy 21'; Marselino 43'

Rizal Memorial Stadium, Manila
Attendance: 2,370
Referee: Ahmed Faisal Al Ali (Jordan)

=== Group B ===
Pos	Team	Pld	W	D	L	GF	GA	GD	Pts	Qualification
1	Vietnam	4	3	1	0	12	0	+12	10	Advance to knockout stage
2	Malaysia	4	3	0	1	10	4	+6	9	Advance to knockout stage
3	Singapore	4	2	1	1	6	6	0	7	
4	Myanmar	4	0	1	3	4	9	−5	1	
5	Laos	4	0	1	3	2	15	−13	1	

Source: AFF
21 December 2022
16:30 UTC+6:30

Myanmar	0–1	Malaysia
	Report (AFFMEC); Report (AFF)	Faisal 52'

Thuwunna Stadium, Yangon
Attendance: 4,500
Referee: Ahmed Faisal Al Ali (Jordan)
21 December 2022
19:30 UTC+7

Laos	0–6	Vietnam
	Report (AFFMEC); Report (AFF)	Nguyễn Tiến Linh 15'; Đỗ Hùng Dũng 43'; Hồ Tấn Tài 55'; Đoàn Văn Hậu 58'; Nguyễn Văn Toàn 82'; Vũ Văn Thanh 90+1'

New Laos National Stadium, Vientiane
Attendance: 10,240
Referee: Hiroki Kasahara (Japan)

24 December 2022
18:00 UTC+8

Singapore	3–2	Myanmar
Ilhan 45'; Shah 49'; Shawal 74'	Report (AFFMEC); Report (AFF)	Maung Maung Lwin 34', 66'

Jalan Besar Stadium, Singapore
Attendance: 5,370
Referee: Kim Jong-hyeok (South Korea)
24 December 2022
20:30 UTC+8

Malaysia	5–0	Laos
Agüero 29'; Faisal 65', 68'; Haqimi 77'; Wilkin 87'	Report (AFFMEC); Report (AFF)

Bukit Jalil National Stadium, Kuala Lumpur
Attendance: 29,961
Referee: Majed Al Shamrani (Saudi Arabia)

27 December 2022
17:00 UTC+7

Laos	0–2	Singapore
	Report (AFFMEC); Report (AFF)	Irfan 32'; Shawal 90+4'

New Laos National Stadium, Vientiane
Attendance: 1,087
Referee: Omar Al-Yaqoubi (Oman)
27 December 2022
19:30 UTC+7

Vietnam	3–0	Malaysia
Nguyễn Tiến Linh 28'; Quế Ngọc Hải 64' (pen.); Nguyễn Hoàng Đức 83'	Report (AFFMEC); Report (AFF)

Mỹ Đình National Stadium, Hanoi
Attendance: 17,545
Referee: Ryuji Sato (Japan)

30 December 2022
16:30 UTC+6:30

Myanmar	2–2	Laos
Kyaw Min Oo 15'; Maung Maung Lwin 90+6'	Report (AFFMEC); Report (AFF)	Soukaphone 12'; Ekkamai 46'

Thuwunna Stadium, Yangon
Attendance: 4,100
Referee: Aziz Asimov (Uzbekistan)
30 December 2022
20:30 UTC+8

Singapore	0–0	Vietnam
	Report (AFFMEC); Report (AFF)

Jalan Besar Stadium, Singapore
Attendance: 5,434
Referee: Hiroki Kasahara (Japan)

3 January 2023
19:30 UTC+7

Vietnam	3–0	Myanmar
Kyaw Zin Lwin 8' (o.g.); Nguyễn Tiến Linh 27'; Châu Ngọc Quang 72'	Report (AFFMEC); Report (AFF)

Mỹ Đình National Stadium, Hanoi
Attendance: 11,575
Referee: Choi Hyun-jai (South Korea)
3 January 2023
20:30 UTC+8

Malaysia	4–1	Singapore
Darren Lok 35'; Wilkin 50', 54'; Agüero 88'	Report (AFFMEC); Report (AFF)	Faris 85'

Bukit Jalil National Stadium, Kuala Lumpur
Attendance: 65,147
Referee: Mohammed Al Hoaish (Saudi Arabia)

== Knockout stage ==
=== Bracket ===
Semi-finals
A2	Indonesia	0	0	0
B1	Vietnam	0	2	2
B2	Malaysia	1	0	1
A1	Thailand	0	3	3

Final
B1	Vietnam	2	0	2
A1	Thailand	2	1	3

=== Semi-finals ===
Team 1	Agg.	Team 2	1st leg	2nd leg
Indonesia	0–2	Vietnam	0–0	0–2
Malaysia	1–3	Thailand	1–0	0–3

First leg

6 January 2023
16:30 UTC+7

Indonesia	0–0	Vietnam
	Report (AFFMEC); Report (AFF)

Gelora Bung Karno Stadium, Jakarta
Attendance: 49,595
Referee: Omar Al-Yaqoubi (Oman)
7 January 2023
20:30 UTC+8

Malaysia	1–0	Thailand
Faisal 11'	Report (AFFMEC); Report (AFF)

Bukit Jalil National Stadium, Kuala Lumpur
Attendance: 62,989
Referee: Kim Dae-yong (South Korea)

Second leg

9 January 2023
19:30 UTC+7

Vietnam	2–0	Indonesia
Nguyễn Tiến Linh 3', 47'	Report (AFFMEC); Report (AFF)

Mỹ Đình National Stadium, Hanoi
Attendance: 23,989
Referee: Yusuke Araki (Japan)

Vietnam won 2–0 on aggregate.

10 January 2023
19:30 UTC+7

Thailand	3–0	Malaysia
Teerasil 19'; Bordin 55'; Adisak 71'	Report (AFFMEC); Report (AFF)

Thammasat Stadium, Pathum Thani
Attendance: 18,927
Referee: Adham Makhadmeh (Jordan)

Thailand won 3–1 on aggregate.

=== Final ===
Team 1	Agg.	Team 2	1st leg	2nd leg
Vietnam	2–3	Thailand	2–2	0–1

First leg

13 January 2023
19:30 UTC+7

Vietnam	2–2	Thailand
Nguyễn Tiến Linh 24'; Vũ Văn Thanh 88'	Report (AFFMEC); Report (AFF)	Poramet 48'; Sarach 63'

Mỹ Đình National Stadium, Hanoi
Attendance: 38,539
Referee: Ko Hyung-jin (South Korea)

Second leg

16 January 2023
19:30 UTC+7

Thailand	1–0	Vietnam
Theerathon 24'	Report (AFFMEC); Report (AFF)

Thammasat Stadium, Pathum Thani
Attendance: 19,306
Referee: Jumpei Iida (Japan)

Thailand won 3–2 on aggregate.

== Statistics ==
=== Winner ===
2022 AFF Championship

Thailand
7th title

=== Awards ===
Most Valuable Player	Young Player of the Tournament	Top Scorer Award	Fair Play Award
(Thailand) Theerathon Bunmathan	(Indonesia) Marselino Ferdinan	(Thailand) Teerasil Dangda (Vietnam) Nguyễn Tiến Linh	Malaysia

=== Goalscorers ===
There were 90 goals scored in 26 matches, for an average of 3.46 goals per match.

6 goals

- (Thailand) Teerasil Dangda
- (Vietnam) Nguyễn Tiến Linh

4 goals

- (Malaysia) Faisal Halim

3 goals

- (Malaysia) Stuart Wilkin
- (Myanmar) Maung Maung Lwin
- (Philippines) Kenshiro Daniels
- (Philippines) Sebastian Rasmussen

2 goals

- (Cambodia) Lim Pisoth
- (Cambodia) Reung Bunheing
- (Indonesia) Dendy Sulistyawan
- (Indonesia) Egy Maulana Vikri
- (Indonesia) Marc Klok
- (Malaysia) Ezequiel Agüero
- (Singapore) Shawal Anuar
- (Thailand) Adisak Kraisorn
- (Thailand) Bordin Phala
- (Thailand) Peeradon Chamratsamee
- (Thailand) Sarach Yooyen
- (Vietnam) Vũ Văn Thanh

1 goal

- (Brunei) Nur Ikhwan Othman
- (Brunei) Razimie Ramlli
- (Cambodia) Choun Chanchav
- (Cambodia) Keo Sokpheng
- (Cambodia) Nick Taylor
- (Cambodia) Orn Chanpolin
- (Cambodia) Sareth Krya
- (Cambodia) Sieng Chanthea
- (Indonesia) Ilija Spasojević
- (Indonesia) Marselino Ferdinan
- (Indonesia) Ramadhan Sananta
- (Indonesia) Syahrian Abimanyu
- (Indonesia) Witan Sulaeman
- (Indonesia) Yakob Sayuri
- (Laos) Ekkamai Ratxachak
- (Laos) Soukaphone Vongchiengkham
- (Malaysia) Haqimi Azim
- (Malaysia) Darren Lok
- (Myanmar) Kyaw Min Oo
- (Philippines) Jesus Melliza
- (Philippines) Sandro Reyes
- (Singapore) Faris Ramli
- (Singapore) Ilhan Fandi
- (Singapore) Irfan Fandi
- (Singapore) Shah Shahiran
- (Thailand) Poramet Arjvirai
- (Thailand) Sumanya Purisai
- (Thailand) Suphanan Bureerat
- (Thailand) Theerathon Bunmathan
- (Vietnam) Châu Ngọc Quang
- (Vietnam) Đoàn Văn Hậu
- (Vietnam) Đỗ Hùng Dũng
- (Vietnam) Hồ Tấn Tài
- (Vietnam) Nguyễn Hoàng Đức
- (Vietnam) Nguyễn Văn Toàn
- (Vietnam) Quế Ngọc Hải

1 own goal

- (Brunei) Yura Indera Putera Yunos (against Thailand)
- (Myanmar) Kyaw Zin Lwin (against Vietnam)

=== Discipline ===
In the tournament, a player will be suspended for the subsequent match in the competition for either getting red card or accumulating two yellow cards in two different matches.

On 3 January 2023, AFF confirmed that Azam Azmi would be suspended for two matches, and would be absent against Singapore and the semi-finals first leg against Thailand.

Player	Offences	Suspensions
(Cambodia) Boris Kok	(yellow card) in Group A v Philippines; (yellow card) in Group A v Indonesia	Group A v Brunei
(Myanmar) Nanda Kyaw	(red card) in Group B v Singapore	Group B v Laos
(Brunei) Alinur Rashimy Jufri	(yellow card) (yellow-red card) in Group A v Indonesia	Group A v Cambodia
(Vietnam) Nguyễn Văn Toàn	(yellow card) (yellow-red card) in Group B v Malaysia	Group B v Singapore
(Malaysia) Azam Azmi	(red card) in Group B v Vietnam	Group B v Singapore; Semi-finals 1st-leg v Thailand
(Thailand) Sanrawat Dechmitr	(red card) in Group A v Indonesia	Group A v Cambodia
(Indonesia) Jordi Amat	(yellow card) in Group A v Cambodia; (yellow card) in Group A v Thailand	Group A v Philippines
(Myanmar) Maung Maung Lwin	(yellow card) in Group B v Singapore; (yellow card) in Group B v Laos	Group B v Vietnam
(Laos) Anantaza Siphongphan	(yellow card) in Group B v Malaysia; (yellow card) in Group B v Myanmar	Team already eliminated from tournament
(Laos) Billy Ketkeophomphone	(yellow card) in Group B v Vietnam; (yellow card) in Group B v Myanmar	Team already eliminated from tournament
(Myanmar) Aung Naing Win	(yellow card) in Group B v Laos; (yellow card) in Group B v Vietnam	Team already eliminated from tournament
(Malaysia) Faisal Halim	(yellow card) in Group B v Laos; (yellow card) in semifinals 2nd leg v Thailand	Team already eliminated from tournament
(Malaysia) Dominic Tan	(yellow card) in Group B v Laos; (yellow card) in semifinals 2nd leg v Thailand	Team already eliminated from tournament
(Thailand) Peeradon Chamratsamee	(yellow card) (yellow-red card) in final 2nd leg v Vietnam	2024 ASEAN Championship Group A v Timor-Leste

=== Tournament teams ranking ===
This table will show the ranking of teams throughout the tournament.

Pos	Team	Pld	W	D	L	GF	GA	GD	Pts	Final result
1	Thailand	8	5	2	1	19	5	+14	17	Champions
2	Vietnam	8	4	3	1	16	3	+13	15	Runners-up
3	Malaysia	6	4	0	2	11	7	+4	12	Semi-finalists
4	Indonesia	6	3	2	1	12	5	+7	11	Semi-finalists
5	Singapore	4	2	1	1	6	6	0	7	Eliminated in group stage
6	Cambodia	4	2	0	2	10	8	+2	6	Eliminated in group stage
7	Philippines	4	1	0	3	8	10	−2	3	Eliminated in group stage
8	Myanmar	4	0	1	3	4	9	−5	1	Eliminated in group stage
9	Laos	4	0	1	3	2	15	−13	1	Eliminated in group stage
10	Brunei	4	0	0	4	2	22	−20	0	Eliminated in group stage

Source: AFF

== Marketing ==
=== Matchballs ===
The official ball for the 2022 edition was called BERSATU, which was sponsored by Warrix Sports. This was the second edition that Warrix had been designated as the Official Match Ball and Sports Apparel Supplier of the Championship.

=== Sponsorship ===
Title sponsor	Official sponsors	Official supporters	Official football website partner
Mitsubishi Electric	Tiger Brokers; Yanmar	Acecook Vietnam; Herbalife Vietnam; Pocari Sweat; TMGM; TikTok; Warrix	GOAL

== Media coverage ==
2022 AFF Championship television broadcasters in Southeast Asia
Country	Broadcastings network	Television	Radio	Live streaming
Brunei	RTB	RTB Aneka	—N/a	RTB Go
Cambodia	FPT Play, Bayon Television	BTV Cambodia	—N/a	—N/a
Indonesia	MNC Media, Emtek	RCTI, (Note: Indonesian matches only) iNews, Soccer Channel, MNC Sports	MNC Trijaya FM	RCTI+ and Vision+
Laos	FPT Play	Lao Star Channel	—N/a	
Malaysia	Astro, RTM	Astro Arena, TV2, TV Okey, Sukan RTM	—N/a	Astro Go, RTMKlik
Myanmar	FPT Play, Sky Net	Sky Net Sports HD, Sky Net Sports 4	—N/a	
Philippines	MNC Media, Emtek	One Sports	—N/a	TAP Go
Singapore	Mediacorp	Channel 5 (Note: Singaporean matches only)	—N/a	meWATCH
Thailand	SAT, Kong Salak Plus	MCOT HD, (Note: Thai and Vietnamese matches only) T Sports 7 (Note: Another matches include Thai matches)	Active Radio FM99	—N/a
Vietnam	FPT Play, VTV	VTV2, VTV5, VTV5 Tây Nam Bộ, VTV Cần Thơ	Pladio247	FPT Play, (Note: Also on FPT Play YouTube channel) VTVgo
2022 AFF Championship international television broadcasters
Rest of world	YouTube	—N/a	—N/a	AFF Mitsubishi Electric Cup
South Korea	Seoul Broadcasting System	SBS, SBS Sports (Note: Indonesian, Malaysian and Vietnamese matches only)	—N/a	SBS TV Live, SBS Sports YouTube channel, and SBS Now

== Incidents and controversies ==
The Group B match between Malaysia and Vietnam was marred by controversy, when Japanese referee Ryuji Sato who officiated the match gave a sudden controversial decision to award a penalty to Vietnam following a clash between Malaysian Azam Azmi and Vietnamese Đoàn Văn Hậu outside the penalty box which saw Azam being sent off, although a similar foul made by Văn Hậu towards Azam was ignored by the same referee. A complaint was made by the Football Association of Malaysia (FAM) towards the ASEAN Football Federation (AFF) regarding the "perceived biasedness of Sato's officiating conduct" since a similar incident had also occurred before in another Malaysia-Vietnam encounter during 2022 FIFA World Cup qualification held in the United Arab Emirates. Through the letter, FAM requested for Sato to never be refereeing any matches involving Malaysia in the future. Nevertheless, earlier before the controversial decision was made, Sato announced that 2022 would be the last year of his refereeing career when he announced his retirement by the end of the year. On 3 January 2023, AFF responded to FAM's letter by giving Azam a two-match ban, where he would miss Malaysia's last group stage match against Singapore and the semi-final first leg against Thailand. Azam also needed to pay a fine of US$1,000 that had to be settled in 30 days. The decisions were not appealable.

Before the Group A match between Indonesia and Thailand, a bus that transported the Thai team was disturbed and halted by Indonesian hooligans, which resulted in the bus needing to be escorted and the Gelora Bung Karno Stadium heavily guarded by the Indonesian National Armed Forces (TNI), Public Order Agency (Satpol PP), firefighters and medical workers. During the match, home fans snatched a Thai flag, stepped and sat on it. Following the incidents, the Football Association of Thailand (FAT) sent an official complaint to AFF with the Football Association of Indonesia (PSSI) expressing their apology and urging leaders and liaisons for supporters to further ensure that further incidents were prevented. FIFA later asked Indonesia to tighten their security for their upcoming match against Vietnam.

The attendance seats for the upcoming 1st leg semi-final match between Malaysia and Thailand in Bukit Jalil national stadium was only available for 59,000 seats, where 21,000 seats had to be vacant due to a world tour concert by Jay Chou on which the singer also held a concert at Singapore's National Stadium earlier, which forced Singapore to use Jalan Besar Stadium instead. Originally due to be held on 3 January 2023, which fell on the same matchday between Malaysia and Singapore, however it got postponed to 15 January 2023. The Malaysian government and FAM hardly tried to make negotiations and appeals, however a decision was not applied. This stirred some Malaysian football fans to throw hate to the singer's social media account instead. On 7 January 2023, Chou finally stated that he could delay the concert, with a permission from FAM. To relief the disappointments among many of the football fans who were unable to attend due to limited spots in the stadium caused by the issues, the Malaysian government in collaboration with local authorities erected 14 big screens in chosen locations nationwide.

Earlier before the 1st leg match between Malaysia and Thailand in Kuala Lumpur, the Royal Malaysia Police (PDRM) announced that a security measure which included body checks as well as bags and items checks would be carried out at each entrance and after entering the stadium grounds. The police released a list of prohibited items that were not allowed to be brought into the stadium such as firecrackers, fireworks, flares, helmets, laser pens, sharp objects and alcoholic beverages. This included umbrellas or walking sticks, powerbanks, water bottles, lighters and cigarettes (including electronic cigarettes). Despite this preventive measures, as seen during the match, some Malaysian fans were still able to smuggle prohibited items into the stadium when some of them were seen pointing green laser lights towards Thai defender Pansa Hemviboon as well as towards the left side face of referee of the match Kim Dae-yong, especially after the second goal of Malaysia from their centre-back player Dominic Tan was disallowed by the referee due to collision with the Thai player.
