= 2024 ASEAN Championship knockout stage =

Second and final phase at the ASEAN Championship

The 2024 ASEAN Championship knockout stage (previously AFF Championship) was played from 26 December 2024 to 5 January 2025. A total of four teams competed in the knockout stage to decide the champions of the 2024 ASEAN Championship.

Vietnam won 5–3 on aggregate over Thailand in the final to win their third title.

== Qualified teams ==
The following teams advanced from the group stage:

Group	Winners	Runners-up
A	Thailand	Singapore
B	Vietnam	Philippines

== Format ==
All ties were played over two legs. The team that scored more goals on aggregate over the two legs won the tie. If the goals on aggregate were still level, extra time was played, and if the same number of goals were scored by both teams during extra time, the tie was decided by a penalty shoot-out.

== Schedule ==
The schedule of each round was as follows.

Round	First leg dates	Second leg dates
Semi-finals	26–27 December 2024	29–30 December 2024
Final	2 January 2025	5 January 2025

== Bracket ==
Semi-finals
A2	Singapore	0	1	1
B1	Vietnam	2	3	5
B2	Philippines	2	1	3
A1	Thailand (a.e.t.)	1	3	4

Final
B1	Vietnam	2	3	5
A1	Thailand	1	2	3

== Semi-finals ==
The top two sides of each group advanced to the knockout stages consisting of two-legged semi-finals and finals.

Team 1	Agg.	Team 2	1st leg	2nd leg
Singapore	1–5	Vietnam	0–2	1–3
Philippines	3–4	Thailand	2–1	1–3 (a.e.t.)

=== First leg ===
==== Singapore vs Vietnam ====
26 December 2024
21:00 UTC+8

Singapore	0–2	Vietnam
	Report	Nguyễn Tiến Linh 90+11' (pen.); Nguyễn Xuân Son 90+14'

Jalan Besar Stadium, Singapore
Attendance: 5,233
Referee: Kim Woo-sung (South Korea)

Singapore	Vietnam

GK	1	Izwan Mahbud
RB	3	Ryhan Stewart		(substituted off) 59'
CB	21	Safuwan Baharudin (c)
CB	15	Lionel Tan
LB	8	Shahdan Sulaiman		(substituted off) 65'
RM	2	Irfan Najeeb
CM	16	Hami Syahin		(substituted off) 83'
CM	6	Shah Shahiran	(yellow card) 61'
LM	5	Amirul Adli
CF	9	Glenn Kweh		(substituted off) 65'
CF	20	Shawal Anuar	(yellow card) 56'
Substitutions:
FW	10	Faris Ramli		(substituted on) 59'
FW	13	Taufik Suparno		(substituted on) 65'
MF	14	Hariss Harun		(substituted on) 65'
DF	11	Shakir Hamzah		(substituted on) 83'
Manager:
(Japan) Tsutomu Ogura

GK	21	Nguyễn Đình Triệu
RB	7	Phạm Xuân Mạnh
CB	16	Nguyễn Thành Chung	(yellow card) 61'
CB	4	Bùi Tiến Dũng		(substituted off) 46'
LB	26	Khuất Văn Khang		(substituted off) 73'
CM	5	Trương Tiến Anh		(substituted off) 46'
CM	14	Nguyễn Hoàng Đức
CM	15	Bùi Vĩ Hào
AM	19	Nguyễn Quang Hải (c)		(substituted off) 60'
CF	18	Đinh Thanh Bình		(substituted off) 60'
CF	12	Nguyễn Xuân Son
Substitutions:
DF	13	Hồ Tấn Tài		(substituted on) 46'
DF	2	Đỗ Duy Mạnh		(substituted on) 46'
MF	25	Doãn Ngọc Tân		(substituted on) 60'
FW	22	Nguyễn Tiến Linh		(substituted on) 60'
DF	3	Nguyễn Văn Vĩ		(substituted on) 73'
Manager:
(South Korea) Kim Sang-sik

Man of the Match:
Đỗ Duy Mạnh (Vietnam)

Assistant referees:
Yoon Jae-yeol (South Korea)
Park Sang-jun (South Korea)
Fourth official:
Razlan Joffri Ali (Malaysia)
Video assistant referee:
Choi Hyun-jai (South Korea)
Assistant video assistant referees:
Sivakorn Pu-udom (Thailand)
Du Jianxin (China)

Overall
Statistics	Singapore	Vietnam
Goals scored	0	2
Total shots	10	11
Shots on target	4	5
Ball possession	66%	33%
Corner kicks	6	5
Fouls committed	8	9
Offsides	3	4
Yellow cards	2	1
Red cards	0	0

==== Philippines vs Thailand ====
27 December 2024
21:00 UTC+8

Philippines	2–1	Thailand
Reyes 21'; Linares 90+5'	Report	Suphanan 45'

Rizal Memorial Stadium, Manila
Attendance: 10,087
Referee: Kim Dae-yong (South Korea)

Philippines	Thailand

GK	16	Quincy Kammeraad
RB	3	Paul Tabinas
CB	4	Kike Linares
CB	2	Adrian Ugelvik
LB	21	Santiago Rublico
CM	17	Zico Bailey
CM	19	Oskari Kekkonen		(substituted off) 71'
RW	13	Alex Monis		(substituted off) 90+3'
AM	6	Sandro Reyes		(substituted off) 90+4'
LW	20	Michael Kempter (c)		(substituted off) 61'
CF	10	Bjørn Martin Kristensen	(yellow card) 25'	(substituted off) 70'
Substitutions:
DF	5	Scott Woods		(substituted on) 61'
FW	9	Jarvey Gayoso		(substituted on) 70'
DF	23	Christian Rontini		(substituted on) 71'
MF	24	Javier Mariona		(substituted on) 90+4'
FW	11	Uriel Dalapo		(substituted on) 90+3'
Manager:
(Spain) Albert Capellas

GK	1	Patiwat Khammai
RB	21	Suphanan Bureerat
CB	4	Jonathan Khemdee
CB	15	Saringkan Promsupa
LB	6	Thitathorn Aksornsri	(substituted off) 46'
DM	18	Weerathep Pomphan
CM	8	Peeradol Chamrasamee (c)
CM	16	Akarapong Pumwisat	(substituted off) 90'
RF	10	Suphanat Mueanta	(substituted off) 64'
CF	9	Patrik Gustavsson	(substituted off) 64'
LF	7	Supachok Sarachat	(substituted off) 79'
Substitutions:
DF	12	Nicholas Mickelson	(substituted on) 46'
MF	25	Seksan Ratree	(substituted on) 64'
FW	14	Teerasak Poeiphimai	(substituted on) 64'
MF	22	Worachit Kanitsribampen	(substituted on) 79'
MF	19	William Weidersjö	(substituted on) 90'
Manager:
(Japan) Masatada Ishii

Man of the Match:
Sandro Reyes (Philippines)

Assistant referees:
Kang Dong-ho (South Korea)
Cheon Jin-hee (South Korea)
Fourth official:
Ngô Duy Lân (Vietnam)
Video assistant referee:
Muhammad Taqi (Singapore)
Assistant video assistant referees:
Du Jianxin (China)
Choi Hyun-jai (South Korea)

Overall
Statistics	Philippines	Thailand
Goals scored	2	1
Total shots	6	14
Shots on target	2	4
Ball possession	42%	57%
Corner kicks	4	0
Fouls committed	5	7
Offsides	3	1
Yellow cards	1	0
Red cards	0	0

=== Second leg ===
==== Vietnam vs Singapore ====
29 December 2024
20:00 UTC+7

Vietnam	3–1	Singapore
Nguyễn Xuân Son 45+1' (pen.), 63'; Nguyễn Tiến Linh 90+3' (pen.)	Report	Nakamura 74'

Việt Trì Stadium, Việt Trì
Attendance: 15,583
Referee: Rustam Lutfullin (Uzbekistan)

Vietnam	Singapore

GK	21	Nguyễn Đình Triệu	(yellow card) 90+7'
CB	2	Đỗ Duy Mạnh (c)
CB	16	Nguyễn Thành Chung
CB	4	Bùi Tiến Dũng	(yellow card) 90+6'
RM	7	Phạm Xuân Mạnh		(substituted off) 81'
CM	24	Nguyễn Hai Long		(substituted off) 60'
CM	25	Doãn Ngọc Tân
CM	14	Nguyễn Hoàng Đức		(substituted off) 70'
LM	17	Vũ Văn Thanh		(substituted off) 70'
SS	8	Châu Ngọc Quang
CF	12	Nguyễn Xuân Son	(yellow card) 83'
Substitutions:
FW	22	Nguyễn Tiến Linh		(substituted on) 60'
DF	13	Hồ Tấn Tài	(yellow card) 86'	(substituted on) 70'
MF	19	Nguyễn Quang Hải		(substituted on) 70'
DF	3	Nguyễn Văn Vĩ		(substituted on) 81'
Manager:
(South Korea) Kim Sang-sik

GK	1	Izwan Mahbud
CB	21	Safuwan Baharudin (c)	(yellow card) 10'
CB	15	Lionel Tan	(yellow card) 43'	(substituted off) 74'
CB	14	Hariss Harun		(substituted off) 87'
RM	4	Nazrul Nazari		(substituted off) 60'
CM	6	Shah Shahiran	(yellow card) 53'
CM	7	Kyoga Nakamura
LM	5	Amirul Adli	(yellow card) 90+1'
AM	9	Glenn Kweh		(substituted off) 60'
CF	20	Shawal Anuar
CF	10	Faris Ramli		(substituted off) 46'
Substitutions:
DF	3	Ryhan Stewart		(substituted on) 46'
DF	22	Christopher van Huizen		(substituted on) 60'
MF	16	Hami Syahin	(yellow card) 90+1'	(substituted on) 60'
FW	23	Abdul Rasaq Akeem		(substituted on) 74'
MF	8	Shahdan Sulaiman		(substituted on) 87'
Manager:
(Japan) Tsutomu Ogura

Man of the Match:
Đỗ Duy Mạnh (Vietnam)

Assistant referees:
Sanzhar Shoyusupov (Uzbekistan)
Alisher Usmanov (Uzbekistan)
Fourth official:
Firdaus Norsafarov (Uzbekistan)
Video assistant referee:
Sivakorn Pu-udom (Thailand)
Assistant video assistant referees:
Du Jianxin (China)

Overall
Statistics	Vietnam	Singapore
Goals scored	3	1
Total shots	10	10
Shots on target	5	5
Ball possession	38%	61%
Corner kicks	5	2
Fouls committed	18	15
Offsides	3	3
Yellow cards	4	5
Red cards	0	0

==== Thailand vs Philippines ====
30 December 2024
20:00 UTC+7

Thailand	3–1 (a.e.t.)	Philippines
Peeradol 37'; Gustavsson 54'; Suphanat 116'	Report	Kristensen 84'

Rajamangala Stadium, Bangkok
Attendance: 31,876
Referee: Hiroyuki Kimura (Japan)

Thailand	Philippines

GK	1	Patiwat Khammai	(yellow card) 120'
RB	21	Suphanan Bureerat
CB	3	Pansa Hemviboon	(yellow card) 69'
CB	5	Chalermsak Aukkee		(substituted off) 78'
LB	12	Nicholas Mickelson
CM	18	Weerathep Pomphan		(substituted off) 98'
CM	8	Peeradol Chamrasamee (c)		(substituted off) 64'
RW	25	Seksan Ratree	(yellow card) 82'	(substituted off) 90+4'
AM	7	Supachok Sarachat
LW	13	Ben Davis	(yellow card) 21'
CF	9	Patrik Gustavsson		(substituted off) 64'
Substitutions:
MF	16	Akarapong Pumwisat		(substituted on) 64'
FW	14	Teerasak Poeiphimai		(substituted on) 64'	(substituted off) 78'
MF	22	Worachit Kanitsribampen		(substituted on) 78'
DF	4	Jonathan Khemdee		(substituted on) 78'
MF	19	William Weidersjö		(substituted on) 90+4'
FW	10	Suphanat Mueanta	(yellow card) 116'	(substituted on) 98'
Manager:
(Japan) Masatada Ishii

GK	16	Quincy Kammeraad
RB	3	Paul Tabinas
CB	12	Amani Aguinaldo
CB	2	Adrian Ugelvik		(substituted off) 51'
LB	20	Michael Kempter (c)
CM	17	Zico Bailey
CM	8	Michael Baldisimo		(substituted off) 51'
RW	13	Alex Monis	(yellow card) 90+1'
AM	6	Sandro Reyes
LW	24	Javier Mariona		(substituted off) 73'
CF	9	Jarvey Gayoso		(substituted off) 90'
Substitutions:
DF	4	Kike Linares		(substituted on) 51'	(substituted off) 87'
DF	23	Christian Rontini	(yellow card) 63'	(substituted on) 51'
FW	10	Bjørn Martin Kristensen	(yellow card) 120+1'	(substituted on) 73'
DF	5	Scott Woods		(substituted on) 87'
MF	19	Oskari Kekkonen		(substituted on) 90'
Manager:
(Spain) Albert Capellas

Man of the Match:
Suphanat Mueanta (Thailand)

Assistant referees:
Isao Hishihashi (Japan)
Kota Watanabe (Japan)
Fourth official:
Nazmi Nasaruddin (Malaysia)
Video assistant referee:
Muhammad Taqi (Singapore)
Assistant video assistant referees:
Choi Hyun-jai (South Korea)
Du Jianxin (China)

Overall
Statistics	Thailand	Philippines
Goals scored	3	1
Total shots	22	18
Shots on target	8	6
Ball possession	53%	46%
Corner kicks	3	6
Fouls committed	24	11
Offsides	0	2
Yellow cards	5	3
Red cards	0	0

== Final ==
Team 1	Agg.	Team 2	1st leg	2nd leg
Vietnam	5–3	Thailand	2–1	3–2

=== First leg ===
2 January 2025
20:00 UTC+7

Vietnam	2–1	Thailand
Nguyễn Xuân Son 59', 73'	Report	Chalermsak 83'

Việt Trì Stadium, Việt Trì
Attendance: 15,604
Referee: Salman Ahmad Falahi (Qatar)

Vietnam	Thailand

GK	21	Nguyễn Đình Triệu
CB	7	Phạm Xuân Mạnh (c)
CB	16	Nguyễn Thành Chung
CB	4	Bùi Tiến Dũng	(yellow card) 64'
LWB	3	Nguyễn Văn Vĩ		(substituted off) 72'
RM	17	Vũ Văn Thanh		(substituted off) 87'
CM	25	Doãn Ngọc Tân	(yellow card) 79'
CM	14	Nguyễn Hoàng Đức		(substituted off) 90+6'
LM	15	Bùi Vĩ Hào		(substituted off) 46'
SS	8	Châu Ngọc Quang		(substituted off) 87'
CF	12	Nguyễn Xuân Son
Substitutions:
MF	19	Nguyễn Quang Hải		(substituted on) 46'
MF	5	Trương Tiến Anh		(substituted on) 72'
DF	2	Đỗ Duy Mạnh		(substituted on) 87'
MF	24	Nguyễn Hai Long		(substituted on) 87'
FW	22	Nguyễn Tiến Linh		(substituted on) 90+6'
Manager:
(South Korea) Kim Sang-sik

GK	1	Patiwat Khammai
RB	21	Suphanan Bureerat
CB	3	Pansa Hemviboon (c)	(yellow card) 11'
CB	5	Chalermsak Aukkee
LB	12	Nicholas Mickelson		(substituted off) 46'
RM	25	Seksan Ratree		(substituted off) 61'
CM	19	William Weidersjö		(substituted off) 61'
CM	16	Akarapong Pumwisat		(substituted off) 45+2'
LM	13	Ben Davis
SS	17	Ekanit Panya	(yellow card) 66'	(substituted off) 73'
CF	9	Patrik Gustavsson
Substitutions:
MF	18	Weerathep Pomphan		(substituted on) 45+2'
DF	6	Thitathorn Aksornsri		(substituted on) 46'
FW	10	Suphanat Mueanta		(substituted on) 61'
MF	7	Supachok Sarachat		(substituted on) 61'
MF	22	Worachit Kanitsribampen		(substituted on) 73'
Manager:
(Japan) Masatada Ishii

Man of the Match:
Nguyễn Xuân Son (Vietnam)

Assistant referees:
Zahy Al Shmari (Qatar)
Khalid Ayed Khalaf (Qatar)
Fourth official:
Tuan Mohd Yaasin (Malaysia)
Video assistant referee:
Muhammad Taqi (Singapore)
Assistant video assistant referees:
Du Jianxin (China)

Overall
Statistics	Vietnam	Thailand
Goals scored	2	1
Total shots	21	13
Shots on target	9	3
Ball possession	37%	63%
Corner kicks	6	3
Fouls committed	10	11
Offsides	2	1
Yellow cards	2	2
Red cards	0	0

=== Second leg ===
5 January 2025
20:00 UTC+7

Thailand	2–3	Vietnam
Davis 28'; Supachok 64'	Report	Phạm Tuấn Hải 8'; Pansa 82' (o.g.); Nguyễn Hai Long 90+20'

Rajamangala Stadium, Bangkok
Attendance: 46,982
Referee: Ko Hyung-jin (South Korea)

Thailand	Vietnam

GK	1	Patiwat Khammai
RB	21	Suphanan Bureerat
CB	3	Pansa Hemviboon
CB	4	Jonathan Khemdee
LB	6	Thitathorn Aksornsri	(yellow card) 79'	(substituted off) 80'
DM	18	Weerathep Pomphan	(yellow card) 13' (yellow-red card) 74'
RM	7	Supachok Sarachat
CM	8	Peeradol Chamrasamee (c)		(substituted off) 90+3'
LM	13	Ben Davis		(substituted off) 90+3'
SS	10	Suphanat Mueanta
CF	9	Patrik Gustavsson		(substituted off) 79'
Substitutions:
MF	25	Seksan Ratree		(substituted on) 79'
DF	12	Nicholas Mickelson		(substituted on) 80'
MF	22	Worachit Kanitsribampen		(substituted on) 90+3'
FW	17	Ekanit Panya		(substituted on) 90+3'
Manager:
(Japan) Masatada Ishii

GK	21	Nguyễn Đình Triệu
CB	7	Phạm Xuân Mạnh
CB	16	Nguyễn Thành Chung
CB	4	Bùi Tiến Dũng
LWB	3	Nguyễn Văn Vĩ		(substituted off) 60'
RM	17	Vũ Văn Thanh
CM	25	Doãn Ngọc Tân	(yellow card) 15'	(substituted off) 60'
CM	14	Nguyễn Hoàng Đức (c)
LM	10	Phạm Tuấn Hải	(yellow card) 4'	(substituted off) 83'
SS	8	Châu Ngọc Quang		(substituted off) 85'
CF	12	Nguyễn Xuân Son		(substituted off) 34'
Substitutions:
FW	22	Nguyễn Tiến Linh		(substituted on) 34'
MF	19	Nguyễn Quang Hải	(yellow card) 90+14'	(substituted on) 60'
DF	2	Đỗ Duy Mạnh		(substituted on) 60'
FW	18	Đinh Thanh Bình		(substituted on) 83'
MF	24	Nguyễn Hai Long	(yellow card) 90+20'	(substituted on) 85'
Manager:
(South Korea) Kim Sang-sik

Man of the Match:
Phạm Tuấn Hải (Vietnam)

Assistant referees:
Park Sang-jun (South Korea)
Kang Dong-ho (South Korea)
Fourth official:
Thoriq Alkatiri (Indonesia)
Video assistant referee:
Choi Hyun-jai (South Korea)
Assistant video assistant referees:
Du Jianxin (China)

Overall
Statistics	Thailand	Vietnam
Goals scored	2	3
Total shots	13	10
Shots on target	4	2
Ball possession	61%	39%
Corner kicks	2	4
Fouls committed	11	3
Offsides	2	0
Yellow cards	2	4
Red cards	1	0
