= Singapore national football team results (2020–present) =

- Win Draw Loss

This article provides details of international football games played by the Singapore national football team from 2020 to present.

== Acronyms ==
Acronyms	Full Name
WC	FIFA World Cup
AFC	Asian Football Federation
AFF	ASEAN Football Federation
Q	Qualification rounds
PO	Play-off round
GS	Group stage
R32	Round of 32
R16	Round of 16
QF	Quarter-finals
SF	Semi-finals
3rd PO	Third place match/play-off
F	Final

== Results ==
=== 2020 ===
No matches played due to the COVID-19 pandemic.

=== 2021 ===
29 May Friendly	Afghanistan	1–1	Singapore	Dubai, United Arab Emirates
	Z. Amiri 90+2'		Gabriel Quak 40'	Stadium: Jebel Ali Centre of Excellence

3 June 2022 FIFA WCQ	Palestine	4–0	Singapore	Riyadh, Saudi Arabia
21:00 UTC+3	Seyam 19' (pen.), 30' (pen.); Dabbagh 23'; Hamed 85'	Report (FIFA); Report (AFC)		Stadium: King Fahd International Stadium; Attendance: 294; Referee: Abdulla Mohamed (UAE)

7 June 2022 FIFA WCQ	Uzbekistan	5–0	Singapore	Riyadh, Saudi Arabia
21:00 UTC+3	Masharipov 6', 34'; Shomurodov 45+1'; Ahmedov 50'; Fandi 88' (o.g.)	Report (FIFA); Report (AFC)		Stadium: King Fahd International Stadium; Attendance: 75; Referee: Ali Abdulnabi (Bahrain)

11 June 2021 2022 FIFA WCQ	Singapore	0–3	Saudi Arabia	Riyadh, Saudi Arabia
21:00 UTC+3		Report (FIFA); Report (AFC)	Al-Dawsari 84'; Al-Muwallad 86'; Al-Shehri 90+6'	Stadium: King Saud University Stadium; Attendance: 4,879; Referee: Mohanad Qasim (Iraq)

11 November Friendly	Singapore	1–2	Kyrgyzstan	Sharjah, United Arab Emirates
21:00 UTC+3	Sulaiman 21'		Akmatov 3'; Batyrkanov 9'	Stadium: Al Hamriya Sports Club Stadium

5 December 2020 AFF GS	Singapore	3–0	Myanmar	Kallang, Singapore
	Safuwan 34'; Ikhsan 39', 45+1'; Irfan (yellow card) 18'; Hariss (yellow card) 67'	Report (AFFSZ); Report (AFF)		Stadium: National Stadium; Attendance: 7,588; Referee: Ahmed Faisal Al-Ali (Jordan); Man of the Match: Ikhsan Fandi

8 December 2020 AFF GS	Philippines	1–2	Singapore	Kallang, Singapore
	Nazari 68'; Aguinaldo (yellow card) 19'; Schröck (yellow card) 22'	Report (AFFSZ); Report (AFF)	Hariss 61'; Faris 63'; Shakir (yellow card) 67'	Stadium: National Stadium; Attendance: 8,922; Referee: Kim Dae-Young (Korea); Man of the Match: Safuwan Baharudin

14 December 2020 AFF GS	Singapore	2–0	Timor-Leste	Kallang, Singapore
	Adam 4'; Shakir 70'	Report (AFFSZ); Report (AFF)		Stadium: National Stadium; Attendance: 8,518; Referee: Mohammed Al-Hoaish (Saudi Arabia); Man of the Match: Shakir Hamzah

18 December 2020 AFF GS	Thailand	2–0	Singapore	Kallang, Singapore
	Dolah 31'; Supachai 45+2'; Pawee (yellow card) 69'; Sivakorn (yellow card) 73'	Report (AFFSZ); Report (AFF)	Hami (yellow card) 18'	Stadium: National Stadium; Attendance: 9,540; Referee: Ahmad Yacoub Ibrahim (Jordan)

22 December 2020 AFF SF 1st leg	Singapore	1–1	Indonesia	Kallang, Singapore
	Ikhsan 70'; Nur Adam (yellow card) 15'; Safuwan (yellow card) 45'	Report (AFFSZ); Report (AFF)	Witan 28'; Arhan (yellow card) 35'	Stadium: National Stadium; Attendance: 9,952; Referee: Kim Hee-gon (South Korea)

25 December 2020 AFF SF 2nd leg	Indonesia	4–2 (a.e.t.)	Singapore	Kallang, Singapore
	Walian 12'; Witan 87'; Shawal 91' (o.g.); Egy 105'; Fachruddin (yellow card) 83'	Report	Song Ui-young 45+3'; Shahdan 74'; Safuwan (yellow card) 36' (yellow-red card) 45'; Irfan (red card) 67'; Shawal (yellow card) 85'	Stadium: National Stadium; Attendance: 9,982; Referee: Qasim Al-Hatmi (Oman)

=== 2022 ===
26 March 2022 FAS Tri-Nations Series	Singapore	2–1	Malaysia	Kallang, Singapore
20:00 UTC+8	Ikhsan Fandi 30', 76'		Liridon Krasniqi 57'	Stadium: National Stadium; Attendance: 14,896; Referee: Ahmad A'qashah (Singapore)

29 March 2022 FAS Tri-Nations Series	Singapore	2–0	Philippines	Kallang, Singapore
20:00 UTC+8	Safuwan Baharudin 10'; Shawal Anuar 90'			Stadium: National Stadium; Attendance: 9,183; Referee: Ahmad A'qashah (Singapore)

1 June Friendly	Kuwait	2–0	Singapore	Abu Dhabi, UAE
19:00 UTC+4	Al-Rashidi 39'; Nasser 87'	Report		Stadium: Al Nahyan Stadium

8 June 2023 Asian Cup Q	Kyrgyzstan	2–1	Singapore	Bishkek, Kyrgyzstan
20:00 UTC+6	Kichin 77' (pen.); Maier 82'	Report	Song Ui-young 57'	Stadium: Dolen Omurzakov Stadium; Attendance: 7,322; Referee: Feras Taweel (Syria)

11 June 2023 Asian Cup Q	Singapore	0–1	Tajikistan	Bishkek, Kyrgyzstan
16:30 UTC+6		Report	Mabatshoev 53'	Stadium: Dolen Omurzakov Stadium; Attendance: 84; Referee: Mohammad Ghabayen (Jordan)

14 June 2023 Asian Cup Q	Myanmar	2–6	Singapore	Bishkek, Kyrgyzstan
16:30 UTC+6	Win Naing Tun 53'; Aung Kaung Mann 66'	Report	Ikhsan 9', 54', 69'; Song Ui-young 16'; Quak 42'; Hafiz 89'	Stadium: Dolen Omurzakov Stadium; Attendance: 0 Referee: Bijan Heydari (Iran)

21 September 2022 VFF Tri-Nations Series	Vietnam	4–0	Singapore	Hồ Chí Minh City, Vietnam
19:00 UTC+7	Nguyễn Văn Quyết 37'; Nguyễn Thanh Nhân 50'; Hồ Tấn Tài 71'; Khuất Văn Khang 84'	Report		Stadium: Thống Nhất Stadium; Referee: Clifford Daypuyat (Philippines)

24 September 2022 VFF Tri-Nations Series	India	1–1	Singapore	Hồ Chí Minh City, Vietnam
19:00 UTC+7	Kuruniyan 43'	Report	Ikhsan 37'	Stadium: Thống Nhất Stadium; Referee: Hoàng Ngọc Hà (Vietnam)

17 December Friendly	Singapore	3–1	Maldives	Kallang, Singapore
19:00 UTC+8	Ilhan Fandi 4' Shawal Anuar 50' 87'		Ibrahim Mahudhee 17'	Stadium: Jalan Besar Stadium

24 December 2022 AFF GS	Singapore	3–2	Myanmar	Kallang, Singapore
	Ilhan Fandi 45'; Shah Shahiran 49'; Shawal Anuar 74'	Report	Maung Maung Lwin 34', 66'	Stadium: Jalan Besar Stadium; Attendance: 5,370; Referee: Kim Jong-hyeok (South Korea); Man of the Match: Shawal Anuar (Singapore)

27 December 2022 AFF GS	Laos	0–2	Singapore	Vientiane, Laos
		Report (AFFMEC)	Irfan Fandi 32'; Shawal Anuar 90+4'	Stadium: New Laos National Stadium; Referee: Yudai Yamamoto (Japan); Man of the Match: Irfan Fandi (Singapore)

30 December 2022 AFF GS	Singapore	0–0	Vietnam	Kallang, Singapore
		Report (AFFMEC)		Stadium: Jalan Besar Stadium; Attendance: 5,434; Referee: Hiroki Kasahara (Japan); Man of the Match: Irfan Fandi (Singapore)

=== 2023 ===
3 January 2022 AFF GS	Malaysia	4–1	Singapore	Kuala Lumpur, Malaysia
	Lok 35'; Wilkin 50', 54'; Agüero 88'	Report (AFFMEC)	Faris 85'	Stadium: Bukit Jalil Stadium; Attendance: 65,147; Referee: Mohammed Al Hoish (Saudi Arabia)

23 March Friendly	Hong Kong	1–1	Singapore	Mong Kok, Hong Kong
20:00 UTC+8	Tan 43' (o.g.)	Report	Tan 20'	Stadium: Mong Kok Stadium

26 March Friendly	Macau	0–1	Singapore	Taipa, Macau
20:00 UTC+8			Lionel Tan 66'	Stadium: Estádio Campo Desportivo

16 June Friendly	Singapore	2–2	Papua New Guinea	Kallang, Singapore
19:30 UTC+8	Adam Swandi 23'; Shawal Anuar 44'		42'; 45'	Stadium: National Stadium; Attendance: 4,918; Referee: Tam Ping Wun (Hong Kong)

18 June Friendly	Singapore	1–1	Solomon Islands	Kallang, Singapore
19:30 UTC+8	Shawal Anuar 31'	Report	Joses Nawo 84'	Stadium: National Stadium; Referee: Somsing Torphong (Thailand)

8 September Friendly	Singapore	0–2	Tajikistan	Bishan, Singapore
19:30 UTC+8		Report	Rakhimov 6'; Khanonov 90+6'	Stadium: Bishan Stadium; Attendance: 2,211; Referee: Thoriq Alkatiri (Indonesia)

12 September Friendly	Singapore	3–1	Chinese Taipei	Bishan, Singapore
19:30 UTC+8	Ui-young 42' (pen.); Tan 65'; Shawal 81'	Report	Kouamé 29'	Stadium: Bishan Stadium; Attendance: 2,189; Referee: Pineda Mick Jon (Philippines)

12 October 2026 FIFA WCQ	Singapore	2–1	Guam	Kallang, Singapore
19:30 UTC+8	Van Huizen 35'; Mahler 41'	Report	Cunliffe 90'	Stadium: National Stadium; Attendance: 10,355; Referee: Mohammad Mofeed Naser Ghabayen (Jordan); Man of the Match: Jacob Mahler (Singapore)

17 October 2026 FIFA WCQ	Guam	0–1 (1–3 agg.)	Singapore	Dededo, Guam
14:45 UTC+10		Report	Shawal 81'	Stadium: GFA National Training Center; Attendance: 1,012; Referee: Chen Hsin-chuan (Chinese Taipei)

16 November 2026 FIFA WCQ	South Korea	5–0	Singapore	Seoul, South Korea
20:00 UTC+9	Cho Gue-sung 44'; Hwang Hee-chan 49'; Son Heung-min 63'; Hwang Ui-jo 68' (pen.); Lee Kang-in 85'	Report		Stadium: Seoul World Cup Stadium; Attendance: 64,381; Referee: Bijan Heydari (Iran)

21 November 2026 FIFA WCQ	Singapore	1–3	Thailand	Kallang, Singapore
20:00 UTC+8	Shawal 41'	Report	Sarachat 5'; Mueanta 66', 87'	Stadium: National Stadium; Attendance: 29,644; Referee: Ahmad Al-Ali (Kuwait)

=== 2024 ===
21 March 2026 FIFA WCQ	Singapore	2–2	China	Kallang, Singapore
20:30 UTC+8	Faris Ramli 53'; Jacob Mahler 82'	Report (FIFA); Report (AFC)	Wu Lei 10', 45+3'	Stadium: National Stadium; Attendance: 28,414; Referee: Shaun Evans (Australia)

26 March 2026 FIFA WCQ	China	4–1	Singapore	Tianjin, China
20:00 UTC+8	Wu Lei 21', 84'; Fernandinho 64' (pen.); Wei Shihao 90'	Report (FIFA); Report (AFC)	Faris Ramli 22'	Stadium: Tianjin Olympic Center; Attendance: 42,977; Referee: Omar Al Ali (United Arab Emirates)

6 June 2026 FIFA WCQ	Singapore	0–7	South Korea	Kallang, Singapore
20:00 UTC+8		Report	Lee Kang-in 9', 54'; Joo Min-kyu 20'; Son Heung-min 53', 56'; Bae Jun-ho 79'; Hwang Hee-chan 82'	Stadium: National Stadium; Attendance: 49,097; Referee: Sadullo Gulmurodi (Tajikistan)

11 June 2026 FIFA WCQ	Thailand	3–1	Singapore	Bangkok, Thailand
19:30 UTC+7	Mueanta 37'; Arjvirai 79'; Wonggorn 88'	Report	Ikhsan 57'	Stadium: Rajamangala Stadium; Attendance: 39,404; Referee: Mohanad Qasim Sarray (Iraq)

14 November Friendly	Singapore	3–2	Myanmar	Kallang, Singapore
20:00 UTC+8	Farhan 5'; Shawal 84'; Naqiuddin 86'	Report	Ye Yint Aung 46'; Thiha Zaw 51'	Stadium: National Stadium; Attendance: 6,061; Referee: Abdulla Al-Shehri (Saudi Arabia)

18 November Friendly	Singapore	2–3	Chinese Taipei	Kallang, Singapore
20:00 UTC+8	Irfan 86'; Shawal 90+3'	Report	Tiao 22'; Sandberg 79'; Kouamé 90+1'	Stadium: National Stadium; Attendance: 6,764; Referee: Sami Ahmed Aljurays (Saudi Arabia)

11 December 2024 ASEAN GS	Singapore	2–1	Cambodia	Kallang, Singapore
19:00 UTC+8	Faris 9'; Shawal 16'	Report	Chanthea 59'	Stadium: National Stadium; Attendance: 12,391; Referee: Ahmed Faisal Al-Ali (Jordan)

14 December 2024 ASEAN GS	Timor-Leste	0–3	Singapore	Hanoi, Vietnam
17:30 UTC+7		Report	Nakamura 76' (pen.); Shawal 84', 90'	Stadium: Hàng Đẫy Stadium; Referee: Ko Hyung-jin (South Korea)

17 December 2024 ASEAN GS	Singapore	2–4	Thailand	Kallang, Singapore
20:30 UTC+8	Shawal 10'; Faris 34'	Report	Gustavsson 45+3'; Suphanat 52'; Peeradol 90+3'; Teerasak 90+15'	Stadium: National Stadium; Attendance: 22,611; Referee: Ismaeel Habib Ali (Bahrain)

20 December 2024 ASEAN GS	Malaysia	0–0	Singapore	Kuala Lumpur, Malaysia
21:00 UTC+8		Report		Stadium: Bukit Jalil National Stadium; Attendance: 31,127; Referee: Hiroyuki Kimura (Japan)

26 December 2024 ASEAN SF 1st leg	Singapore	0–2	Vietnam	Kallang, Singapore
21:00 UTC+8		Report	Nguyễn Tiến Linh 90+10' (pen.); Rafaelson 90+13'	Stadium: Jalan Besar Stadium; Attendance: 5,233; Referee: Kim Woo-sung (South Korea)

29 December 2024 ASEAN SF 2nd leg	Vietnam	3–1 (5–1 agg.)	Singapore	Việt Trì, Vietnam
20:00 UTC+7	Rafaelson 45' (pen.), 63'; Nguyễn Tiến Linh 90+2' (pen.)	Report	Nakamura 74'	Stadium: Việt Trì Stadium; Attendance: 15,583; Referee: Rustam Lutfullin (Uzbekistan)

=== 2025 ===
21 March Friendly	Singapore	0–1	Nepal	Kallang, Singapore
20:30 UTC+8			Gillespye Jung Karki 12'	Stadium: National Stadium; Referee: Yusuke Ohashi (Japan)

25 March 2027 Asian Cup Q	Singapore	0–0	Hong Kong	Kallang, Singapore
20:30 UTC+8				Stadium: National Stadium; Attendance: 8,064; Referee: Chae Sang-hyeop (South Korea)

5 June Friendly	Singapore	3–1	Maldives	Bishan, Singapore
	Amirul Adli 7'; Ikhsan Fandi 20', 32'	Report	Ahmed Rizuvan 90+1' (pen.)	Stadium: Bishan Stadium; Attendance: 2,297; Referee: Razlan Joffri Ali (Malaysia)

10 June 2027 Asian Cup Q	Bangladesh	1–2	Singapore	Dhaka, Bangladesh
19:00 UTC+6	Rakib Hossain 67'		Song 45'; Fandi 58'	Stadium: National Stadium; Attendance: 21,317; Referee: Clifford Daypuyat (Philippines)

4 September Friendly	Malaysia	0–3; Awarded (Note: Due to the Malaysian football naturalisation scandal, the FIFA Disciplinary Committee awarded the match as a 3–0 win to Singapore on 17 December 2025 as Malaysia fielded the ineligible players Gabriel Palmero, Facundo Garcés, Rodrigo Holgado, João Figueiredo and Jon Irazabal. The Football Association of Malaysia (FAM) were also fined CHF 10,000.)	Singapore	Kuala Lumpur, Malaysia
21:00 UTC+8		Report		Stadium: Bukit Jalil National Stadium; Attendance: 22,329; Referee: Ngô Duy Lân (Vietnam)

9 September Friendly (Note: Closed-door friendly)	Singapore	1–1	Myanmar	Kallang, Singapore
21:00 UTC+8	Ilhan Fandi 90'	Report	Thet Hein Soe 60'	Stadium: Jalan Besar Stadium; Attendance: 0

9 October 2027 Asian Cup Q	Singapore	1–1	India	Kallang, Singapore
19:30 UTC+8	Fandi 46'		Rahim 90'	Stadium: National Stadium; Attendance: 13232

14 October 2027 Asian Cup Q	India	1–2	Singapore	Goa, India
22:00 UTC+8	Song 44', 58'	Report	Chhangte 14'	Stadium: Pandit Jawaharlal Nehru Stadium

13 November Friendly	Thailand	3–2	Singapore	Pathum Thani, Thailand
19:30 UTC+7	Yooyen 15'; Bunmathan 47'; Ratree 53'	Report	Kweh 17', 62'	Stadium: Thammasat Stadium; Attendance: 10,205; Referee: Hoàng Ngọc Hà (Vietnam)

18 November 2027 Asian Cup Q	Hong Kong	1–2	Singapore	Kowloon, Hong Kong
20:00 UTC+8	Orr 15'	Report	Anuar 64'; Fandi 68'	Stadium: Kai Tak Sports Park; Attendance: 47,762

=== 2026 ===
26 March Friendly	Faroe Islands	Cancelled	Singapore	Dubai, United Arab Emirates
17:00 UTC+4				Stadium: Rashid Stadium
Note: Match cancelled due to the 2026 Iran war.

31 March 2027 Asian Cup Q	Singapore	1–0	Bangladesh	Kallang, Singapore
20:00 UTC+8	H. Stewart 31'	Report; Report (AFC)		Stadium: National Stadium; Attendance: 30,105; Referee: Ben Abraham (Australia)

31 May Friendly	Singapore	4–0	Mongolia	Kallang, Singapore
12:30 UTC+8	Baharudin 23' (pen.); Song 38' (as: Farhan Zulkifli); Orkhon 58' (o.g.); Ikhsan 87' (as: Irfan Najeeb)	Report		Stadium: Jalan Besar Stadium; Attendance: 4,234; Referee: Kim Woosung

5 June Friendly	Singapore	1–2	China	Kallang, Singapore
19:30 UTC+8	Ilhan 76'	Report	Serginho 16'; Zhang Yuning 41' (pen.)	Stadium: Jalan Besar Stadium; Attendance: 4,688; Referee: Rustam Lutfullin (Uzbekistan)

24 July 2026 ASEAN GS	Cambodia	1–2	Singapore	Phnom Penh, Cambodia
19:00 UTC+7	Ouk 55'	Report	Shawal 22'; Ilhan 90+12'	Stadium: Morodok Techo National Stadium; Attendance: 27,790; Referee: Koji Takasaki (Japan); Player of the Match: Ilhan

27 July 2026 ASEAN GS	Singapore	2–0	Timor-Leste	Jalan Besar, Singapore
19:00 UTC+8	Ilhan 41'; Song 56'	Report		Stadium: Jalan Besar Stadium; Attendance: 4,665; Referee: Salman Ahmad Falahi (Qatar); Player of the Match: Ilhan Fandi

31 July 2026 ASEAN GS	Vietnam	0–0	Singapore	Hanoi, Vietnam
20:00 UTC+7		Report		Stadium: Mỹ Đình National Stadium; Attendance: 31,569; Referee: Hiroki Kasahara (Japan); Player of the Match: Hariss Harun

7 August 2026 ASEAN GS	Singapore	1–1	Indonesia	Jalan Besar, Singapore
21:00 UTC+8	Ilhan 66'	Report	Oratmangoen 47'	Stadium: Jalan Besar Stadium; Attendance: 5,113; Referee: Abdullah Salim Khalfan Al-Amouri (Oman); Player of the Match: Jacob Mahler

15 August 2026 ASEAN SF 1st leg	Singapore	1–3	Thailand	Jalan Besar, Singapore
21:00 UTC+8	Ilhan 84'	Report	Teerasak 13', 26'; Seksan 51'	Stadium: Jalan Besar Stadium; Attendance: 5,358; Referee: Mahmood Al Majarafi (Oman); Player of the Match: Seksan Ratree

18 August 2026 ASEAN SF 2nd leg	Thailand	1–2 (4-3 agg.)	Singapore	Bangkok, Thailand
20:00 UTC+7	Khamyok 61'	Report	Stewart 45'; Hemviboon 65' (o.g.)	Stadium: Rajamangala Stadium; Attendance: 10,802; Referee: Kim Woo-Sung (South Korea); Player of the Match: Ryhan Stewart

25 September 2026 FIFA ASEAN Cup	Indonesia	2–0	Singapore	Jakarta, Indonesia
19:00 UTC+7	Oratmangoen 13'; Romeny 74' (pen.)	Report		Stadium: Gelora Bung Karno Stadium; Attendance: 38,702; Referee: Rustam Lutfullin (Uzbekistan)

28 September 2026 FIFA ASEAN Cup	Singapore	1–0	Bangladesh	Jakarta, Indonesia
15:00 UTC+7	H. Stewart 35'	Report		Stadium: Gelora Bung Karno Stadium; Referee: Mongkolchai Pechsri (Thailand)

1 October 2026 FIFA ASEAN Cup	Malaysia	6–0	Singapore	Bandung, Indonesia
18:30 UTC+7	Bérgson 8' (pen.), 62', 90+3'; Wilkin 26'; Josué 76'; Bashah 87'	Report		Stadium: Si Jalak Harupat Stadium; Referee: Kim Jong-hyeok (South Korea)

13 November Mizuho Blue Challenge	Singapore	1–4	Paraguay	Kallang, Singapore
20:00 UTC+8	Song 30'	Report	Caballero 7', 53'; Maurício 45'; Enciso 82'	Stadium: National Stadium; Attendance: 14,360; Referee: Wiwat Jumpaoon (Thailand)
Note: Mizuho Blue Challenge - The Kallang Football Series Singapore

17 November Mizuho Blue Challenge	Singapore	0–7	Brazil	Kallang, Singapore
18:00 UTC+8			Júnior 9', 15', 21'; Endrick 31'; Willian 51'; Rayan 65'; Suhaimi 74' (o.g.)	Stadium: National Stadium
Note: Mizuho Blue Challenge - The Kallang Football Series Singapore

=== 2027 ===
TBC 2027 Asian Cup GS	Australia	v	Singapore	Al Khobar, Saudi Arabia
--:-- UTC+3				Stadium: Aramco Stadium

TBC 2027 Asian Cup GS	Singapore	v	Tajikistan	Riyadh, Saudi Arabia
--:-- UTC+3				Stadium: King Saud University Stadium

TBC 2027 Asian Cup GS	Iraq	v	Singapore	Riyadh, Saudi Arabia
--:-- UTC+3				Stadium: Al-Shabab Club Stadium

== See also ==
- Singapore women's national football team results
