= 2024 ASEAN Championship final =

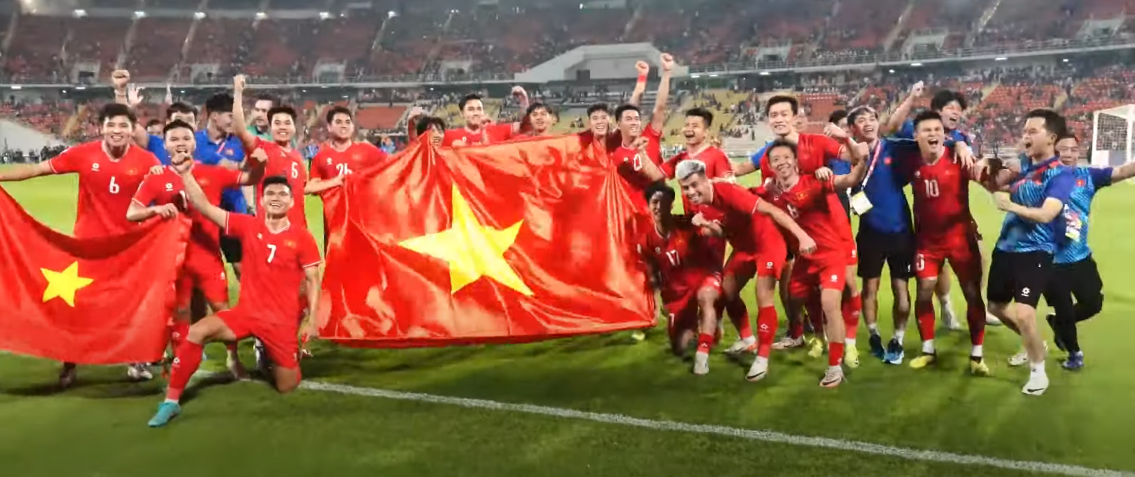
- Vietnam players and staff celebrating after winning the 2024 ASEAN Championship.
- Event: 2024 ASEAN Championship
Vietnam	Thailand
(Vietnam)	(Thailand)
5	3
- on aggregate

First leg
Vietnam	Thailand
2	1
- Date: 2 January 2025
- Venue: Việt Trì Stadium, Việt Trì
- Referee: Salman Ahmad Falahi (Qatar)
- Attendance: 15,604
- Weather: Cloudy night 25 °C (77 °F); 48% humidity

Second leg
Thailand	Vietnam
2	3
- Date: 5 January 2025
- Venue: Rajamangala Stadium, Bangkok
- Referee: Ko Hyung-jin (South Korea)
- Attendance: 46,982
- Weather: Cloudy night 28 °C (82 °F); 41% humidity

The 2024 ASEAN Championship final was the association football series and the final of the 2024 ASEAN Championship (previously AFF Championship), the 15th edition of the top-level Southeast Asia football tournament organised by the ASEAN Football Federation (AFF).

The final was contested in two-legged home-and-away series format between Vietnam and Thailand. The first leg was hosted by Vietnam at the Việt Trì Stadium in Phú Thọ on 2 January 2025, while the second leg was hosted by Thailand at the Rajamangala Stadium in Bangkok on 5 January 2025.

Vietnam secured their third title after defeating the two-time defending champions Thailand by a 5–3 aggregate score in the two-legged final.

== Background ==
This was the fifth ASEAN Championship final and second consecutive finals for Vietnam, having won in 2008 and 2018 finals, but lost in two 1998 and 2022 finals, and the eleventh ASEAN Championship final and third consecutive finals for Thailand, having won the 1996, 2000, 2002, 2014, 2016, 2020, 2022 finals, and lost in 2007, 2008, and 2012 finals.

Both were the strongest-ranked AFF teams in the FIFA World Rankings; Thailand was ranked first in Southeast Asia at 97th while Vietnam was ranked 2nd there at 114th. This marks the second time that the finalists have met in the final of the ASEAN Championship in consecutive editions (2000 and 2002 was the other time) when Thailand played Indonesia. Thailand had the second-highest win percentage in the ASEAN Championship finals with 70% while Vietnam had only 50%. Also, Thailand was leading the all-time championship table with seven titles to their name while Vietnam, on the other hand, only won two in 2008 and 2018. They have met in the final twice: in 2008 when Vietnam won 3–2 on aggregate (won 2–1 in the first leg; and drew 1–1 in the second) and 2022 when Thailand won by the same scoreline (2–2 draw in the first leg; and won 1–0 in the second). In all competitions since Vietnam's reintegration, Thailand won 18 meetings, Vietnam won only 3, and 8 matches ended in draws.

This final between the two countries is highly anticipated given their success, having won each AFF tournament since 2014.

== Summary of results ==
=== Group standings ===
Group B standings
Pos	Team	Pld	Pts
1	Vietnam	4	10
2	Philippines	4	6
3	Indonesia	4	4
4	Myanmar	4	4
5	Laos	4	2

Source: ASEAN United FC

Group A standings
Pos	Team	Pld	Pts
1	Thailand	4	12
2	Singapore	4	7
3	Malaysia	4	5
4	Cambodia	4	4
5	Timor-Leste	4	0

Source: ASEAN United FC

=== Match results ===
Vietnam				Round	Thailand			
Opponent	Result			Group stage	Opponent	Result		
Laos	1–4 (A)			Matchday 1	Timor-Leste	0–10 (A)		
Indonesia	1–0 (H)			Matchday 2	Malaysia	1–0 (H)		
Philippines	1–1 (A)			Matchday 3	Singapore	2–4 (A)		
Myanmar	5–0 (H)			Matchday 4	Cambodia	3–2 (H)		
Opponent	Agg.	1st leg	2nd leg	Knockout stage	Opponent	Agg.	1st leg	2nd leg
Singapore	5–1	0–2 (A)	3–1 (H)	Semi-finals	Philippines	4–3	2–1 (A)	3–1 (a.e.t) (H)

== Series summary ==
Match	Date	Home team	Score	Road team	Venue	Attendance	Series details
First leg	January 2, 2025	Vietnam	2–1	Thailand	Việt Trì Stadium	15,604	Vietnam lead aggregate 2–1
Second leg	January 5, 2025	Thailand	2–3	Vietnam	Rajamangala Stadium	46,982	Vietnam win series 5–3 on aggregate

== Matches ==
=== First leg ===
2 January 2025
20:00 UTC+7

Vietnam	2–1	Thailand
Nguyễn Xuân Son 59', 73'	Report	Chalermsak 83'

Việt Trì Stadium, Việt Trì
Attendance: 15,604
Referee: Salman Ahmad Falahi (Qatar)

Vietnam	Thailand

GK	21	Nguyễn Đình Triệu
CB	7	Phạm Xuân Mạnh (c)
CB	16	Nguyễn Thành Chung
CB	4	Bùi Tiến Dũng	(yellow card) 64'
LWB	3	Nguyễn Văn Vĩ		(substituted off) 72'
RM	17	Vũ Văn Thanh		(substituted off) 87'
CM	25	Doãn Ngọc Tân	(yellow card) 79'
CM	14	Nguyễn Hoàng Đức		(substituted off) 90+6'
LM	15	Bùi Vĩ Hào		(substituted off) 46'
SS	8	Châu Ngọc Quang		(substituted off) 87'
CF	12	Nguyễn Xuân Son
Substitutions:
MF	19	Nguyễn Quang Hải		(substituted on) 46'
MF	5	Trương Tiến Anh		(substituted on) 72'
DF	2	Đỗ Duy Mạnh		(substituted on) 87'
MF	24	Nguyễn Hai Long		(substituted on) 87'
FW	22	Nguyễn Tiến Linh		(substituted on) 90+6'
Manager:
(South Korea) Kim Sang-sik

GK	1	Patiwat Khammai
RB	21	Suphanan Bureerat
CB	3	Pansa Hemviboon (c)	(yellow card) 11'
CB	5	Chalermsak Aukkee
LB	12	Nicholas Mickelson		(substituted off) 46'
RM	25	Seksan Ratree		(substituted off) 61'
CM	19	William Weidersjö		(substituted off) 61'
CM	16	Akarapong Pumwisat		(substituted off) 45+2'
LM	13	Ben Davis
SS	17	Ekanit Panya	(yellow card) 66'	(substituted off) 73'
CF	9	Patrik Gustavsson
Substitutions:
MF	18	Weerathep Pomphan		(substituted on) 45+2'
DF	6	Thitathorn Aksornsri		(substituted on) 46'
FW	10	Suphanat Mueanta		(substituted on) 61'
MF	7	Supachok Sarachat		(substituted on) 61'
MF	22	Worachit Kanitsribampen		(substituted on) 73'
Manager:
(Japan) Masatada Ishii

Man of the Match:
Nguyễn Xuân Son (Vietnam)

Assistant referees:
Zahy Al Shmari (Qatar)
Khalid Ayed Khalaf (Qatar)
Fourth official:
Tuan Mohd Yaasin (Malaysia)
Video assistant referee:
Muhammad Taqi (Singapore)
Assistant video assistant referees:
Du Jianxin (China)

Overall
Statistics	Vietnam	Thailand
Goals scored	2	1
Total shots	21	13
Shots on target	9	3
Ball possession	37%	63%
Corner kicks	6	3
Fouls committed	10	11
Offsides	2	1
Yellow cards	2	2
Red cards	0	0

=== Second leg ===
==== Pre-match ====
===== Officiating =====
On 3 January 2025, Ko Hyung-jin of the Korea Republic was named as the referee for the second leg of the final, with fellow Korean Republic Park Sang-jun and Kang Dong-ho as assistant referees. Thoriq Alkatiri of Indonesia were named as the fourth official. He was previously a referee at the 2023 FIFA U-17 World Cup, 2019 AFC Asian Cup, 2023 AFC Asian Cup, 2018 AFC U-23 Championship, 2020 AFC U-23 Championship and 2024 AFC U-23 Asian Cup. He became the third Korean Republic to referee an ASEAN Championship final (after 1998 final, 2004 final first leg and as himself at the 2022 final first leg). He was also one of the supporting referees at 2019 FIFA U-17 World Cup.

===== Dignitaries in attendance =====
FIFA Secretary General Mattias Grafström along with FAT president Nualphan Lamsam and VFF president Trần Quốc Tuấn attended the second leg of the ASEAN Championship final. Prime minister Paetongtarn Shinawatra and her husband Pitaka Suksawat was also in attendance.

Notably, AFF president Khiev Sameth wasn't attended the final, and FIFA president Gianni Infantino wasn't attended either, despite some rumours that he would attended the final as same as the 2022's second leg final, where he was attended to presented the trophy to Thailand.

5 January 2025
20:00 UTC+7

Thailand	2–3	Vietnam
Davis 28'; Supachok 64'	Report	Phạm Tuấn Hải 8'; Pansa 82' (o.g.); Nguyễn Hai Long 90+20'

Rajamangala Stadium, Bangkok
Attendance: 46,982
Referee: Ko Hyung-jin (South Korea)

Thailand	Vietnam

GK	1	Patiwat Khammai
RB	21	Suphanan Bureerat
CB	3	Pansa Hemviboon
CB	4	Jonathan Khemdee
LB	6	Thitathorn Aksornsri	(yellow card) 79'	(substituted off) 80'
DM	18	Weerathep Pomphan	(yellow card) 13' (yellow-red card) 74'
RM	7	Supachok Sarachat
CM	8	Peeradol Chamrasamee (c)		(substituted off) 90+3'
LM	13	Ben Davis		(substituted off) 90+3'
SS	10	Suphanat Mueanta
CF	9	Patrik Gustavsson		(substituted off) 79'
Substitutions:
MF	25	Seksan Ratree		(substituted on) 79'
DF	12	Nicholas Mickelson		(substituted on) 80'
MF	22	Worachit Kanitsribampen		(substituted on) 90+3'
FW	17	Ekanit Panya		(substituted on) 90+3'
Manager:
(Japan) Masatada Ishii

GK	21	Nguyễn Đình Triệu
CB	7	Phạm Xuân Mạnh
CB	16	Nguyễn Thành Chung
CB	4	Bùi Tiến Dũng
LWB	3	Nguyễn Văn Vĩ		(substituted off) 60'
RM	17	Vũ Văn Thanh
CM	25	Doãn Ngọc Tân	(yellow card) 15'	(substituted off) 60'
CM	14	Nguyễn Hoàng Đức (c)
LM	10	Phạm Tuấn Hải	(yellow card) 4'	(substituted off) 83'
SS	8	Châu Ngọc Quang		(substituted off) 85'
CF	12	Nguyễn Xuân Son		(substituted off) 34'
Substitutions:
FW	22	Nguyễn Tiến Linh		(substituted on) 34'
MF	19	Nguyễn Quang Hải	(yellow card) 90+14'	(substituted on) 60'
DF	2	Đỗ Duy Mạnh		(substituted on) 60'
FW	18	Đinh Thanh Bình		(substituted on) 83'
MF	24	Nguyễn Hai Long	(yellow card) 90+20'	(substituted on) 85'
Manager:
(South Korea) Kim Sang-sik

Man of the Match:
Phạm Tuấn Hải (Vietnam)

Assistant referees:
Park Sang-jun (South Korea)
Kang Dong-ho (South Korea)
Fourth official:
Thoriq Alkatiri (Indonesia)
Video assistant referee:
Choi Hyun-jai (South Korea)
Assistant video assistant referees:
Du Jianxin (China)

Overall
Statistics	Thailand	Vietnam
Goals scored	2	3
Total shots	13	10
Shots on target	4	2
Ball possession	61%	39%
Corner kicks	2	4
Fouls committed	11	3
Offsides	2	0
Yellow cards	2	4
Red cards	1	0
