= Ben Davis (footballer, born 2000) =

Thai footballer

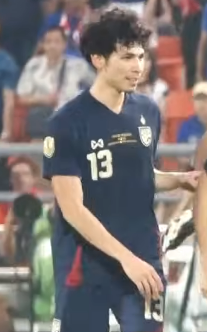
- Davis with Thailand at the 2024 ASEAN Championship final

Personal information
- Full name: Benjamin James Davis
- Date of birth: 24 November 2000 (age 25)
- Place of birth: Phuket, Thailand
- Height: 1.75 m (5 ft 9 in)
- Positions: Attacking midfielder; winger

Team information
- Current team: Uthai Thani
- Number: 10

Youth career
- 2013–2016: Singapore Sports School
- 2017–2019: Fulham

Senior career*
Years	Team	Apps	(Gls)
2019–2021	Fulham	0	(0)
2021–2023	Oxford United	0	(0)
2022–2023	→ Port (loan)	14	(0)
2023–2024	Chonburi	7	(0)
2024–	Uthai Thani	43	(8)

International career^{‡}
2015	Singapore U16	3	(0)
2017	Singapore U19	3	(0)
2020–2022	Thailand U23	13	(2)
2023–	Thailand	13	(5)
Medal record
Thailand under-23
SEA Games
Silver medal – second place	Hanoi 2021	Team
Thailand
ASEAN Championship
Runner-up	ASEAN 2024	Team
- * Club domestic league appearances and goals as of 08:25, 13 March 2025 (UTC) ‡ National team caps and goals as of 13 November 2025

Benjamin James Davis (born 24 November 2000) is a Thai professional footballer who plays as an attacking midfielder or a winger for Thai League 1 side Uthai Thani and the Thailand national team.

== Club career ==
=== Youth ===
Davis started his career training at JSSL Singapore, a youth soccer academy owned by his father based in Singapore that has partnerships with Fulham and Singapore Premier League side Tampines Rovers. He later joined the Football Association of Singapore's (FAS) Junior Centre of Excellence, and went on to represent various national age group teams.

=== Fulham ===
In 2017, Davis earned a two-year academy scholarship with Fulham after impressing in trials. He was the first ever Singaporean player to sign for a Premier League side.

In his first season, Davis made 10 appearances for the club's under-18 South League team, scoring a header against West Ham's Under-18 side and recording a passing accuracy of 90 percent. In 2018, Fulham announced that Davis, alongside other academy players, were offered professional contracts, where they would now earn a weekly wage as well as continue to play for the club's Under-18 and Under-23 side. He signed his first professional Fulham contract in June 2017 and is listed on the club's website as an English national. On 13 October 2019, Davis confirmed that he had registered to play as a local player with the English Football Association.

=== Oxford United ===
On 31 August 2021, Davis joined League One side Oxford United on a two-year deal.

==== Port (loan) ====
In August 2022 he was sent on a season-long loan to Thai League 1 club Port His contract with Oxford was not renewed at the end of the 2022–23 season.

=== Chonburi ===
On 19 May 2023, Davis signed with Chonburi. On 11 January 2024, Chonburi has officially announced the release of Davis to join Uthai Thani, a team participating in the Thai League 2nd leg of the 2023/24 season, He played a total of 9 matches for the team in all competitions.

=== Uthai Thani ===
On 11 January 2024, Davis signed with Uthai Thani.

== International career ==
Davis currently holds passports from the United Kingdom, Thailand, and Singapore but represents Thailand internationally.

During his training stint with JSSL Singapore and FAS Junior Centre of Excellence, Davis represented Singapore in several 2016 AFC U-16 Championship qualifiers in 2015. In 2017, Davis earned a call-up to Singapore's under-19 side to play in several 2018 AFC Under-19 Championship qualifiers.

In 2018, Davis received a surprise call-up to the senior Singapore national team for a run of 2019 AFC Asian Cup qualifiers, but he did not play in any of the matches.

In September 2019, Davis was called up to the Thailand under-23 national team for the SEA Games training camp.

In 2020, Davis represented Thailand at the 2020 AFC U-23 Championship, appearing in a 1–1 draw against Iraq in the group stage as well as a 1–0 loss to Saudi Arabia in the quarter-final, cap-tying him to Thailand. In 2022, he was called up to the U23 team for the 2022 AFC U-23 Asian Cup.

=== Senior ===
In 2023, Davis received his first call-up to the Thailand national team for the 2023 King's Cup to replace captain, Chanathip Songkrasin who withdrew from the squad due to injury. In November 2024, he was selected in the Thailand squad for the 2024 ASEAN Championship. Thailand was due to travel to Singapore in December for their match in the ASEAN Championship but Davis' availability to play in Singapore is in doubt. Davis scored a brace on 8 December 2024 in a 10–0 thrashing win over Timor-Leste but was substituted in the 42nd minute due to an ankle injury. As a result, he was out for two weeks and was not in the Thailand squad for the matches against Malaysia on 14 December and Singapore on 17 December.

== Personal life ==
Davis was born in Phuket, Thailand, and migrated to Singapore at the age of five with his family. Davis studied at the Singapore Sports School from 2013 to 2015 before moving to London's Harrow High School in 2016. In 2017, he was awarded a two-year scholarship with Fulham's academy.

Davis is the second-youngest of four children. His mother, Sopee Davis, is Thai, while his father, Harvey Davis, is English.

=== National service evasion ===
As a Singaporean citizen, Davis was to be conscripted under the city-state's national service scheme upon turning 18. His application for deferment to develop his professional career as a footballer with Fulham was rejected by the Ministry of Defence (MINDEF) as he did "not meet the criteria for long-term deferment from full-time NS". His father drew parallels to Joseph Schooling, a national swimmer who was granted deferment and went on to win Olympic medals.

MINDEF countered that Davis' contract with Fulham was no different from other pre-enlistees' personal pursuits and a further appeal supported by the Football Association of Singapore (FAS) was also denied. The ministry also said that Davis did not meet the criteria for long-term deferment due to it being a personal pursuit, and that it was unfair to other pre-enlistees who served their NS commitments. It further added that the deferment rejection was also based on grounds that Davis' father "would not commit to a date" on when his son would return to Singapore to serve NS, coupled with subsequent remarks to the media that he would encourage his son to renounce his Singapore citizenship in order to pursue his career.

On 11 January 2019, Davis failed to report for national service and since 18 February 2019 has been deemed as a defaulter. While the FAS had previously supported Davis' deferment application, they condemned his decision to not return. In October 2019, Davis eventually chose to represent Thailand and declared he would not return to Singapore despite being a citizen, and had no intentions to fulfill his national service obligations.

== International statistics ==
=== Singapore under-16 international caps ===
No	Date	Venue	Opponent	Result	Competition
1	28 July 2015	Phnom Penh Olympic Stadium, Phnom Penh, Cambodia	Myanmar	1–3 (lost)	2015 AFF U-16 Youth Championship
2	1 August 2015	Phnom Penh Olympic Stadium, Phnom Penh, Cambodia	Australia	2–8 (lost)	2015 AFF U-16 Youth Championship
3	3 August 2015	Phnom Penh Olympic Stadium, Phnom Penh, Cambodia	Cambodia	0–0 (draw)	2015 AFF U-16 Youth Championship

=== Singapore under-19 international caps ===
No	Date	Venue	Opponent	Result	Competition
1	4 November 2017	MFF Football Centre, Ulaanbaatar, Mongolia	Thailand	0–2 (lost)	2018 AFC U-19 Championship qualification
2	6 November 2017	MFF Football Centre, Ulaanbaatar, Mongolia	Japan	0–7 (lost)	2018 AFC U-19 Championship qualification
3	8 November 2017	MFF Football Centre, Ulaanbaatar, Mongolia	Mongolia	2–4 (lost)	2018 AFC U-19 Championship qualification

=== Thailand under-23 international caps ===
No	Date	Venue	Opponent	Result	Competition
1	14 January 2020	Rajamangala Stadium, Bangkok, Thailand	Iraq	1–1 (draw)	2020 AFC U-23 Championship
2	18 January 2020	Rajamangala Stadium, Bangkok, Thailand	Saudi Arabia	0–1 (lost)	2020 AFC U-23 Championship
3.	25 October 2021	Ulaanbaatar, Mongolia	Mongolia	1–1 (draw)	2022 AFC U-23 Asian Cup qualification
4.	31 October 2021	Ulaanbaatar, Mongolia	Malaysia	0–0 (draw)	2022 AFC U-23 Asian Cup qualification
5.	7 May 2022	Nam Dinh, Vietnam	Malaysia	1–2 (lost)	2021 Southeast Asian Games
6.	9 May 2022	Nam Dinh, Vietnam	Singapore	5–0 (win)	2021 Southeast Asian Games
7.	2 June 2022	Milliy Stadium, Tashkent, Uzbekistan	Vietnam	2–2 (draw)	2022 AFC U-23 Asian Cup

=== International goals ===
#	Date	Venue	Opponent	Score	Result	Competition
1.	8 December 2024	Hàng Đẫy Stadium, Hanoi, Vietnam	Timor-Leste	1–0	10–0	2024 ASEAN Championship
2.	8 December 2024	Hàng Đẫy Stadium, Hanoi, Vietnam	Timor-Leste	4–0	10–0	2024 ASEAN Championship
3.	5 January 2025	Rajamangala Stadium, Bangkok, Thailand	Vietnam	1–1	2–3	2024 ASEAN Championship
4.	4 June 2025	Thammasat Stadium, Pathum Thani, Thailand	India	1–0	2–0	Friendly
5.	4 September 2025	Kanchanaburi Province Stadium, Kanchanaburi, Thailand	Fiji	1–0	3–0	2025 King's Cup

== Honours ==
Thailand U23

- SEA Games silver medal: 2021

ASEAN All-Stars

- Maybank Challenge Cup: 2025

Individual

- Thai League 1 Goal of the Month: April 2025
