= Rafaelson =

Brazilian-Vietnamese footballer (born 1997)

Nguyễn Xuân Son Rafaelson
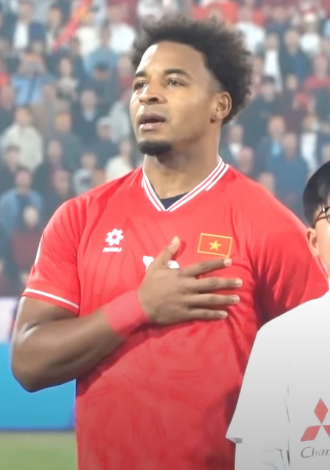
- Xuân Son in 2024

Personal information
- Full name: Nguyễn Xuân Son
- Birth name: Rafaelson Bezerra Fernandes
- Date of birth: 30 March 1997 (age 29)
- Place of birth: Pirapemas, Brazil
- Height: 1.85 m (6 ft 1 in)
- Position: Striker

Team information
- Current team: Nam Định
- Number: 14

Youth career
- 2011–2013: Bahia
- 2013–2016: Vitória

Senior career*
Years	Team	Apps	(Gls)
2015–2018	Vitória	12	(1)
2018	→ Vegalta Sendai (loan)	0	(0)
2018–2019	Vegalta Sendai	0	(0)
2019–2020	Næstved	24	(5)
2020	Nam Định	18	(6)
2020–2021	SHB Đà Nẵng	12	(6)
2021–2023	Bình Định	39	(21)
2023–	Nam Định	45	(45)

International career^{‡}
2024–	Vietnam	18	(16)
Medal record
Men's football
Representing Vietnam
ASEAN Championship
Winner	ASEAN 2024
Winner	ASEAN 2026
- * Club domestic league appearances and goals as of 6 September 2026 ‡ National team caps and goals as of 26 September 2026

Rafaelson Bezerra Fernandes (Brazilian Portuguese pronunciation: [ʁafaɛwˈsõ beˈze.ʁɐ feʁˈnɐ̃.d͡ʒis], born 30 March 1997), known mononymously as Rafaelson and also as Nguyễn Xuân Son (Vietnamese pronunciation: [ŋwiən˦ˀ˥ swən˧˧ sɔn˧˧]), is a professional footballer who plays as a striker for the V.League 1 club Thép Xanh Nam Định. Born in Brazil, he represents the Vietnam national team.

Rafaelson began his football career in his native Brazil. He went playing abroad from 2018 and had unsuccessful spells in Japan and Denmark. In 2020, he moved to Vietnam, signing for Nam Định. In this country, he blossomed as a goalscorer, finishing as V.League 1's top scorer in the 2023 and 2023–24. The 2023–24 season was notable as he scored 31 goals in the V.League 1, breaking the previous record of 25 goals set by Lê Huỳnh Đức in 1996. Rafaelson’s outstanding form played a key role in helping Nam Định win the V.League 1 title and established him as the leading goalscorer in Vietnamese football.

Rafaelson is a dual citizen of Brazil and Vietnam. After five years of residency in Vietnam, he was granted Vietnamese citizenship in September 2024. Later in the year, he featured in the 2024 ASEAN Championship for Vietnam and scored a brace in his debut against Myanmar. Later, he finished as the top goalscorer of the tournament and assisted Vietnam in their win of the title; he went on to receive the best player award for his performances. In the 2026 edition, he helped Vietnam defended their title and finished once again as top scorer.

== Early life ==
Rafaelson was born in a poor family in Pirapemas, Maranhão. His father was a teacher and his mother was a farmer. At the age of 14, he moved alone to Salvador, Bahia, where he joined the youth academy of Bahia. After two years, he joined the youth side of Vitória.

== Club career ==
=== Vitória ===
A Vitória youth graduate, Rafaelson was accused of faking his age in April 2015, a claim later dismissed by the club. He was promoted to the first team in September, by manager Vagner Mancini.

Rafaelson made his professional debut on 5 September 2015, coming on as a second-half substitute for Robert in a 2–1 home loss against Botafogo for the Série B championship. His first goal came on 31 October, netting the last in a 3–2 home loss against Náutico. He contributed with seven appearances during the campaign, as his side achieved promotion to Série A.

On 30 June 2016, Rafaelson made his top tier debut, replacing Tiago Real in a 3–2 home win against Sport Recife.

=== Vegalta Sendai ===
In February 2018, Rafaelson joined Japanese club Vegalta Sendai on a loan deal. A month later, he made his first appearance for the team in the J.League Cup game against Albirex Niigata, but suffered a serious injury in the match that required three months of recovery. In August 2018, his transfer to Vegalta Sendai was made permanent. However, in January 2019, he departed from the club after his contract expired, without having appeared in any league game.

=== Næstved ===
On 13 April 2019, Rafaelson moved to Denmark and joined Næstved. He scored five goals after 24 league appearances for the team in two seasons.

=== First spell at Nam Định ===
In December 2019, Rafaelson arrived in Vietnam. He went on a trial with V.League 1 club Nam Định. After two friendly games, Nam Định head coach decided to sign him. Næstved announced on 12 January 2020, that they had sold Rafaelson to Vietnamese club in the V.League 1. In the last matchday of the 2020 V.League 1, he scored the only goal for Nam Định in a 1–1 against Song Lam Nghe An, thus help the club avoid relegation. After one season at Nam Định, he netted 9 goals for the club after 20 appearances. However, he departed the team after one season as they were unable to meet his salary increase demands.

=== SHB Đà Nẵng ===
Rafaelson joined V.League 1 fellow SHB Đà Nẵng for the 2021 season. He scored six goals for the team after the first 12 games of the season, before the league was cancelled due to the effects of COVID-19 pandemic in Vietnam. Due to financial difficulties, SHB Đà Nẵng terminated Rafaelson's contract in September 2021.

=== Bình Định ===
In September 2021, Rafaelson moved to Topenland Bình Định as a free agent, signing a two-year contract. On 3 September 2022, he scored his first hattrick in V.League 1 in to help his team defeat the league's leading team Hanoi FC 3–0. He later lead his team to the 2022 Vietnamese Cup final, scoring a hattrick in the semi-final game against Đông Á Thanh Hóa. In the 2023 season, Rafaelson became the league top scorer, netting a total of 16 goals and was named in the team of the season.

=== Return to Nam Định and dominance in V.League 1 ===
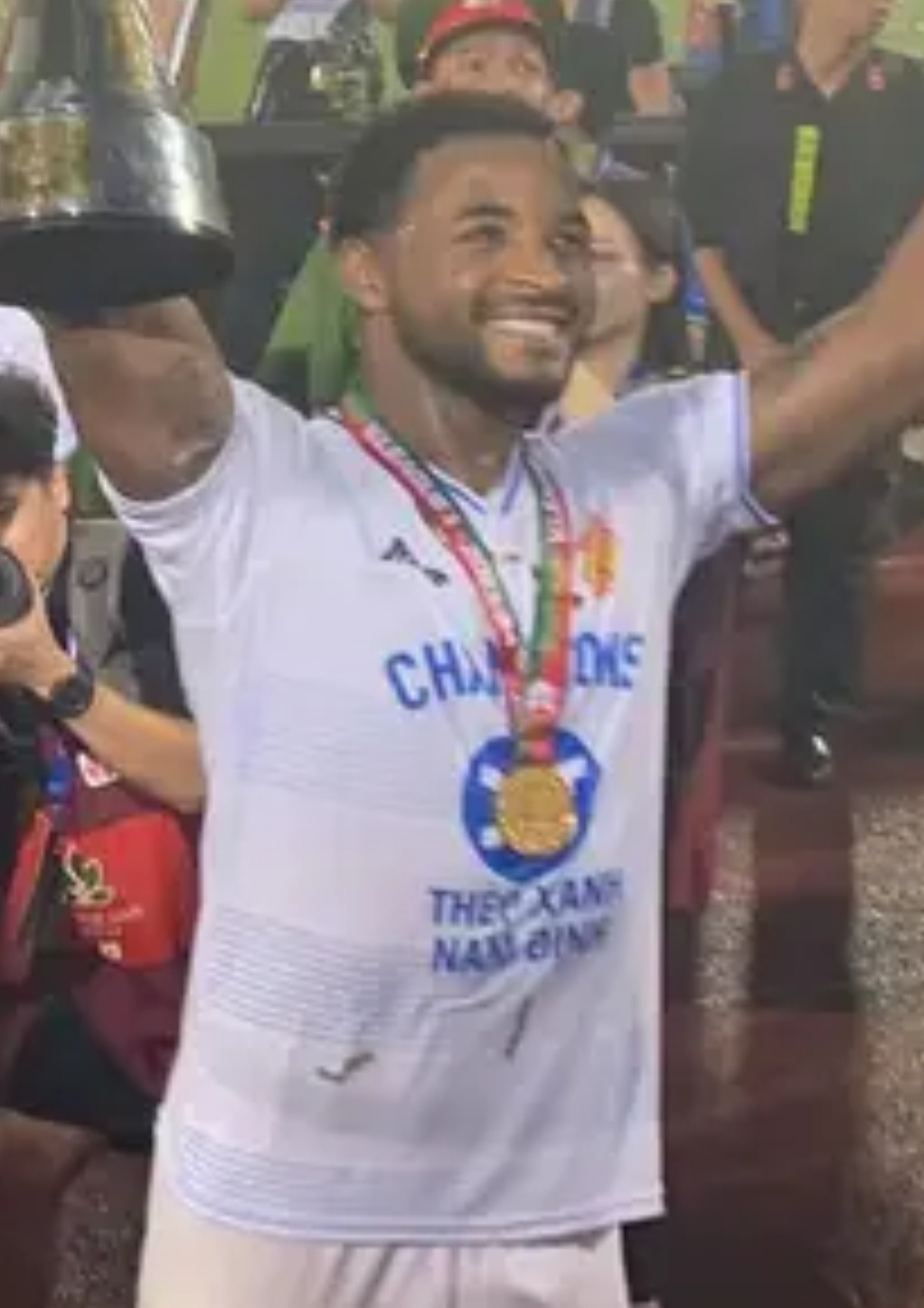
Rafaelson celebrating the 2023–24 V.League 1 title with Nam Định.

On 28 August 2023, after his contract with Topenland Bình Định expired, Rafaelson made his return to Nam Định. Being paired with Hêndrio in the attack, he quickly became an influential goal scorer of the club. He registered 13 goals and 4 assists after the first half of the season, helping Nam Định top the league. On 26 May 2024, he scored five goals in a 5–2 victory against Đông Á Thanh Hóa, which tied the record for most goals scored by a single player in a single game in the V.League 1 history with Hoàng Anh Gia Lai's Nguyễn Đình Việt back in 2007. On 25 June 2024, Rafaelson netted a hat-trick in a 5–1 league win against Khánh Hòa, thus securing the first national league title for Nam Định since 1985. He finished the season as the league's top scorer with 31 goals, thus broke the record for most goals scored by a single player in a single V.League 1 season, previously held by Lê Huỳnh Đức (25 goals). In addition to the top scorer award, Rafaelson was also given the Player of the Year award and featured in the league's Team of the Season for the second season in a row.

On 31 August 2024, Rafaelson scored a brace in the 2024 Vietnamese Super Cup final to contribute in Nam Định's 3–0 win against Đông Á Thanh Hóa, winning the trophy for the first time in the club's history. Shortly after the start of the 2024–25 season, he was granted Vietnamese passport and was registered for the league as a local player.

On 5 April 2025, Rafaelson successfully recovered from his injury and returned back to his club for physical rehabilitation. On 10 September, Rafaelson has been included in the club's 2025–26 Vietnamese Cup's squad list. He make his return to action on 23 November in the Vietnamese Cup round of 16 fixtures against V.League 2 side Long An. In the next match in the 2025–26 ASEAN Club Championship against Myanmar club Shan United on 4 December, Rafaelson scored a hat-trick putting his team in a 3–0 win in Yangon. In the next match in the competition against Thai side Bangkok United on 17 December, he went on to score a brace in a 4–1 win putting his goal tally to 5 goals in the competition.

== International career ==
In November 2024, FIFA authorized Rafaelson to represent the Vietnam national team after five years of residency in the country. He was named in Vietnam's preliminary squad for the 2024 ASEAN Championship. He was later named in the final squad for the tournament.

On 6 November 2025, Rafaelson returned to his national team after 10 months.

=== 2024 ASEAN Championship ===
Rafaelson made his debut for the Vietnam national team on 21 December 2024 where he scored two goals and made 2 assists in a 5–0 victory against Myanmar in the last group stage game in the 2024 ASEAN Championship. He thus became the first Vietnamese naturalized player to score in an official game.

In the first leg semi-final at Jalan Besar Stadium, he scored the second goal, securing a 2–0 victory for Vietnam against Singapore. In the second leg game at Việt Trì Stadium, Rafaelson netted another two goals, contributing significantly to Vietnam's 3–1 win.

Rafaelson continued his scoring streak by adding two more goals in Vietnam's 2–1 win against Thailand in the first leg of the ASEAN Championship final. During the second leg of the final at Rajamangala Stadium, he broke his fibula and tibia bone and was substituted off and sent to the hospital in the 32nd minute. Later, Vietnam won the final with a 5–3 aggregate score against Thailand. With 7 goals scored during the ASEAN Championship campaign, Rafaelson won the Top scorer and Best player award.

=== 2025–present: Post-injury ===
After a successful surgery, Rafaelson was expected to take an 8 month absence. According to doctors, it will take only two months for his bones to heal after surgery and an additional six months of rehabilitation and training. However, he missed the first four matches of the final round of 2027 AFC Asian Cup qualification. On his return to the national team in the November international FIFA window, Rafaelson scored in a 2–0 win over Laos in the 2027 AFC Asian Cup qualification on 19 November 2025.

On 31 March 2026, Rafaelson scored twice against Malaysia in the final 2027 AFC Asian Cup qualification fixture at Thiên Trường Stadium, helping his national team secure a perfect qualifying record with all six wins achieved. Rafaelson was named in Vietnam's 2026 ASEAN Championship squad. He scored twice against Timor-Leste on the opening fixture to help his nation dominantly win 7–0. On 3 August, Rafaelson scored the third goal against Indonesia to seal the match with a dominant 3–0 victory for the defending champions. In the second leg of the semi-finals against Malaysia, Rafaelson scored twice at Mỹ Đình National Stadium, helping his team prevail 4–0 on aggregate and march to the final. Vietnam eventually won the ASEAN Championship for the second time in a row after defeating Thailand 4–2 across both legs. Having scored five goals during the tournament, Rafaelson became the competition's joint top-scorer alongside teammate Nguyễn Đình Bắc.

On 26 September 2026, Rafaelson has suffered another injury again during 2026 FIFA ASEAN Cup opening game against the Philippines. He collapsed on the field in the 60th minute in the game due to a hamstring injury, resulting him being left out for the rest of the tournament.

== Personal life ==
Rafaelson married Marcele Seippel in January 2018 and has two children.

In August 2024, after five years of residency in Vietnam, Rafaelson applied for Vietnamese citizenship at the Nam Định Department of Justice, expressing his wish to represent the Vietnam national team in the future. A month later, on 20 September 2024, he officially obtained Vietnamese citizenship with the Vietnamese personal name Nguyễn Xuân Son.

== Career statistics ==
=== Club ===
As of match played 6 September 2026

Appearances and goals by club, season and competition
Club	Season	League			State league (Note: Include Campeonato Paulista)		National cup (Note: Includes Copa do Brasil, Norwegian Cup, Vietnamese Cup)		Continental		Other		Total	
Club	Season	Division	Apps	Goals	Apps	Goals	Apps	Goals	Apps	Goals	Apps	Goals	Apps	Goals
Vitória	2015	Série B	7	1	0	0	—		—		—		7	1
Vitória	2016	Série A	1	0	0	0	1	0	—		—		2	0
Vitória	2017	Série A	4	0	2	0	0	0	—		—		6	0
Vitória	2018	Série A	0	0	1	0	0	0	—		—		1	0
Vitória	Total		12	1	3	0	1	0	0	0	0	0	16	1
Vegalta Sendai	2018	J1 League	0	0	—		0	0	—		1 (Note: Appearance in J.League Cup)	0	1	0
Næstved BK	2018–19	1st Division	6	1	—		0	0	—		—		6	1
Næstved BK	2019–20	1st Division	18	4	—		2	0	—		—		20	4
Næstved BK	Total		24	5	0	0	2	0	0	0	0	0	26	5
Nam Định	2020	V.League 1	18	6	—		2	3	—		—		20	9
SHB Đà Nẵng	2021	V.League 1	12	6	—		0	0	—		—		12	6
Topenland Bình Định	2022	V.League 1	21	5	—		4	3	—		—		25	8
Topenland Bình Định	2023	V.League 1	18	16	—		2	1	—		—		20	17
Topenland Bình Định	Total		39	21	0	0	6	4	0	0	0	0	45	25
Thép Xanh Nam Định	2023–24	V.League 1	24	31	—		3	1	—		—		27	32
Thép Xanh Nam Định	2024–25	V.League 1	7	7	—		0	0	5 (Note: Appearance in AFC Champions League Two)	5	1 (Note: Appearance in Vietnamese Super Cup)	2	13	14
Thép Xanh Nam Định	2025–26	V.League 1	13	6	—		3	2	0	0	5 (Note: Appearance in ASEAN Club Championship)	7	21	15
Thép Xanh Nam Định	2026–27	V.League 1	1	1	—		0	0	—		—		1	1
Thép Xanh Nam Định	Total		45	45	0	0	6	3	5	5	6	9	62	62
Total career			150	84	3	0	17	10	5	5	7	9	182	108

=== International ===
As of match played 26 September 2026

Appearances and goals by national team and year
National team	Year	Apps	Goals
Vietnam	2024	3	5
Vietnam	2025	3	3
Vietnam	2026	12	8
Total		18	16

Scores and results list Vietnam's goal tally first, score column indicates score after each Rafaelson goal.

List of international goals scored by Nguyễn Xuân Son
No.	Date	Venue	Cap	Opponent	Score	Result	Competition
1	21 December 2024	Việt Trì Stadium, Việt Trì, Vietnam	1	Myanmar	2–0	5–0	2024 ASEAN Championship
2	21 December 2024	Việt Trì Stadium, Việt Trì, Vietnam	1	Myanmar	4–0	5–0	2024 ASEAN Championship
3	26 December 2024	Jalan Besar Stadium, Kallang, Singapore	2	Singapore	2–0	2–0	2024 ASEAN Championship
4	29 December 2024	Việt Trì Stadium, Việt Trì, Vietnam	3	Singapore	1–0	3–1	2024 ASEAN Championship
5	29 December 2024	Việt Trì Stadium, Việt Trì, Vietnam	3	Singapore	2–0	3–1	2024 ASEAN Championship
6	2 January 2025	Việt Trì Stadium, Việt Trì, Vietnam	4	Thailand	1–0	2–1	2024 ASEAN Championship
7	2 January 2025	Việt Trì Stadium, Việt Trì, Vietnam	4	Thailand	2–0	2–1	2024 ASEAN Championship
8	19 November 2025	New Laos National Stadium, Vientiane, Laos	6	Laos	1–0	2–0	2027 AFC Asian Cup qualification
9	31 March 2026	Thiên Trường Stadium, Ninh Bình, Vietnam	8	Malaysia	2–0	3–1	2027 AFC Asian Cup qualification
10	31 March 2026	Thiên Trường Stadium, Ninh Bình, Vietnam	8	Malaysia	3–0	3–1	2027 AFC Asian Cup qualification
11	18 July 2026	Thái Nguyên Stadium, Thái Nguyên, Vietnam	9	Myanmar	1–0	4–0	Friendly
12	24 July 2026	Chonburi Stadium, Chonburi, Thailand	10	Timor-Leste	5–0	7–0	2026 ASEAN Championship
13	3 August 2026	Pakansari Stadium, Bogor, Indonesia	12	Indonesia	3–0	3–0	2026 ASEAN Championship
14	16 August 2026	Kuala Lumpur Stadium, Kuala Lumpur, Malaysia	14	Malaysia	1–0	2–0	2026 ASEAN Championship
15	19 August 2026	Mỹ Đình National Stadium, Hanoi, Vietnam	15	Malaysia	1–0	2–0	2026 ASEAN Championship
16	19 August 2026	Mỹ Đình National Stadium, Hanoi, Vietnam	15	Malaysia	2–0	2–0	2026 ASEAN Championship

== Honours ==
=== Club ===
Vitória

- Campeonato Baiano: 2016

Topenland Bình Định

- Vietnamese Cup runners-up: 2022

Thép Xanh Nam Định

- V.League 1: 2023–24, 2024–25
- Vietnamese Super Cup: 2024; runners-up: 2025

=== International ===
Vietnam

- ASEAN Championship: 2024, 2026

=== Individual ===
- V.League 1 top scorer: 2023, 2023–24
- V.League 1 Team of the Season: 2023, 2023–24
- V.League 1 Player of the Year: 2023–24
- V.League 1 Goal of the Year: 2023–24
- ASEAN Championship Most Valuable Player: 2024
- ASEAN Championship Top scorer: 2024, 2026
- ASEAN Championship All-Star XI: 2024
- Vietnamese Golden Ball Best Foreign Player: 2024
- Dedication Awards Sports Face of the year: 2025
- ASEAN Club Championship Top scorer: 2025–26

Orders

- Third-class Labor Order: 2025
