= Nguyễn Hai Long =

Vietnamese footballer

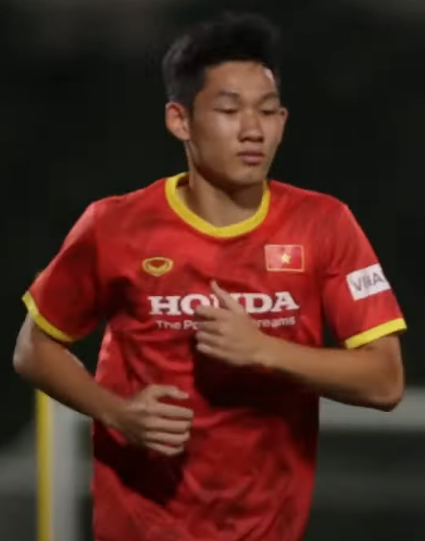
- Hai Long in 2021

Personal information
- Full name: Nguyễn Hai Long
- Date of birth: 27 August 2000 (age 26)
- Place of birth: Tiên Yên, Quảng Ninh, Vietnam
- Height: 1.68 m (5 ft 6 in)
- Positions: Winger; midfielder

Team information
- Current team: Hà Nội
- Number: 14

Youth career
- 2011–2015: Viettel
- 2015–2019: Than Quảng Ninh

Senior career*
Years	Team	Apps	(Gls)
2018	→ Phù Đổng (loan)	3	(0)
2019	→ Lâm Đồng (loan)	10	(1)
2020–2021	Than Quảng Ninh	18	(2)
2021–	Hà Nội	109	(16)

International career^{‡}
2014–2015	Vietnam U16	5	(0)
2020–2022	Vietnam U23	13	(0)
2021–	Vietnam	29	(8)
Medal record
Men's football
Representing Vietnam
SEA Games
Gold medal – first place	Hanoi 2021	Team
ASEAN Championship
Winner	ASEAN 2024
Winner	ASEAN 2026
- * Club domestic league appearances and goals as of 21 November 2026 ‡ National team caps and goals as of 5 October 2026

Nguyễn Hai Long (born 27 August 2000) is a Vietnamese professional footballer who plays as a winger or midfielder for V.League 1 club Hà Nội, and the Vietnam national team.

== Club career ==
=== Than Quảng Ninh ===
Born in Quảng Ninh, Hai Long had always shown a passion for football from a young age and soon trained at Viettel Football Center. He and Viettel became national U-13 runners-up and U-15 champions before returning to train for Than Quảng Ninh in 2015.

Before being promoted to Than Quảng Ninh's first team, Hai Long had loan spells at lower divisions teams Phù Đổng and Lâm Đồng.

He debuted in the V.League 1 in 2020. He quickly become a starter for Than Quảng Ninh and played an important role to help the club finished fourth in the league.

=== Hà Nội ===
In October 2021, after Than Quảng Ninh disbanded, Hà Nội recruited Hai Long on a 5-year contract. In his first season with the team, he won both the domestic league and cup title.

At the end of the 2024–25 season, Hai Long was named in the league's Team of the Season.

== International career ==
=== Youth ===
In 2020, Park Hang-seo called Hai Long up to the Vietnam U22 squad. He took part in the 2021 SEA Games hosted in his home country and won the gold medal.

=== Senior ===
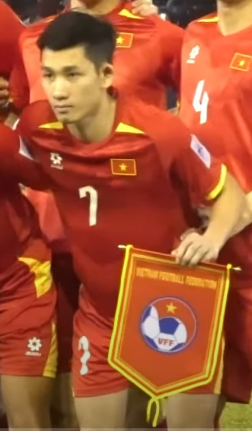
Hai Long during a national team match in 2025.

In May 2021, Hai Long received his first call up to the Vietnam national team. He made his international debut in a friendly game against Jordan on 1 June 2021.

In December 2023, Hai Long was named in Vietnam's preliminary squad for the 2023 AFC Asian Cup and was later included in the final 26-men squad but didn't make a single appearance in the tournament.

On 9 December 2024, Hai Long scored his first international goal during the 2024 ASEAN Championship against Laos. During the second leg of the 2024 ASEAN Championship final, Hai Long scored the last goal of the tournament – an empty net goal against Thailand, assuring Vietnam to win the title.

== Career statistics ==
=== Club ===
As of match played 21 November 2026

Club	Season	League			Cup		Continental		Other		Total	
Club	Season	Division	Apps	Goals	Apps	Goals	Apps	Goals	Apps	Goals	Apps	Goals
Than Quảng Ninh	2020	V.League 1	18	2	2	1	3 (Note: Appearance in AFC Cup)	0	—		23	3
Than Quảng Ninh	2021	V.League 1	0	0	0	0	—		—		0	0
Than Quảng Ninh	Total		18	2	2	1	3	0	0	0	23	3
Hà Nội	2022	V.League 1	16	3	3	0	—		—		19	3
Hà Nội	2023	V.League 1	14	0	1	0	—		0	0	15	0
Hà Nội	2023–24	V.League 1	26	4	4	3	6 (Note: Appearance in AFC Champions League)	0	—		36	7
Hà Nội	2024–25	V.League 1	22	5	0	0	—		—		22	5
Hà Nội	2025–26	V.League 1	23	3	1	0	—		—		24	3
Hà Nội	2026–27	V.League 1	8	1	1	0	—		—		9	1
Hà Nội	Total		109	16	10	3	6	0	0	0	125	19
Total career			127	18	12	4	9	0	0	0	148	22

=== International ===
As of match played 5 October 2026

Appearances and goals by national team and year
National team	Year	Apps	Goals
Vietnam	2021	1	0
Vietnam	2024	5	1
Vietnam	2025	8	3
Vietnam	2026	15	5
Total		29	8

Scores and results list Vietnam's goal tally first, score column indicates score after each Hai Long goal.

List of international goals scored by Nguyễn Hai Long
No.	Date	Venue	Opponent	Score	Result	Competition
1.	9 December 2024	New Laos National Stadium, Vientiane, Laos	Laos	1–0	4–1	2024 ASEAN Championship
2.	5 January 2025	Rajamangala Stadium, Bangkok, Thailand	Thailand	3–2	3–2	2024 ASEAN Championship
3.	19 March 2025	Gò Đậu Stadium, Thủ Dầu Một, Vietnam	Cambodia	1–0	2–1	Friendly
4.	25 March 2025	Gò Đậu Stadium, Thủ Dầu Một, Vietnam	Laos	4–0	5–0	2027 AFC Asian Cup qualification
5.	26 March 2026	Hàng Đẫy Stadium, Hanoi, Vietnam	Bangladesh	3–0	3–0	Friendly
6.	3 August 2026	Pakansari Stadium, Bogor, Indonesia	Indonesia	2–0	3–0	2026 ASEAN Championship
7.	22 August 2026	Rajamangala Stadium, Bangkok, Thailand	Thailand	1–0	2–0	2026 ASEAN Championship
8.	2 October 2026	Gelora Bung Karno Stadium, Jakarta, Indoneia	Pakistan	1–1	4–2	2026 FIFA ASEAN Cup

== Honours ==
Hà Nội

- V.League 1: 2022
- Vietnamese National Cup: 2022
- Vietnamese Super Cup: 2022

Vietnam U23

- SEA Games gold medal: 2021

Vietnam

- ASEAN Championship: 2024, 2026

ASEAN All-Stars

- Maybank Challenge Cup: 2025

Individual

- ASEAN Championship All-Star XI: 2024
- V.League 1 Team of the Season: 2024–25
