= Nguyễn Đình Triệu =

Vietnamese footballer (born 1991)

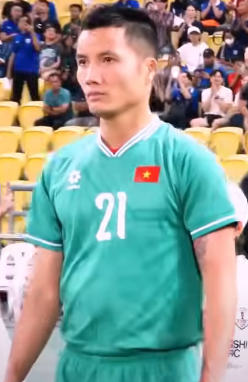
- Đình Triệu in 2025

Personal information
- Full name: Nguyễn Đình Triệu
- Date of birth: 4 November 1991 (age 35)
- Place of birth: Kiến Xương, Thái Bình, Vietnam
- Height: 1.80 m (5 ft 11 in)
- Position: Goalkeeper

Team information
- Current team: Công An Nhân Dân
- Number: 1

Youth career
- 2007–2013: Hà Nội

Senior career*
| Years | Team | Apps | (Gls) |
| 2014 | Thanh Niên Sài Gòn | 6 | (0) |
| 2020–2021 | Bình Phước | 17 | (0) |
| 2022–2026 | Hải Phòng | 110 | (0) |
| 2026– | Công An Nhân Dân | 4 | (0) |

International career^{‡}
| 2009–2010 | Vietnam U19 | 1 | (0) |
| 2023– | Vietnam | 11 | (0) |
Medal record
Men's football
Representing Vietnam
ASEAN Championship
| Winner | ASEAN 2024 |
- * Club domestic league appearances and goals as of 22 October 2026 ‡ National team caps and goals as of 25 March 2025

Nguyễn Đình Triệu (born 4 November 1991) is a Vietnamese professional footballer who plays as a goalkeeper for V.League 2 club Công An Nhân Dân.

== Early career ==
Born in Thái Bình, Nguyễn Đình Triệu joined Hà Nội FC's youth academy. Despite being a regular starter keeper for the team youth categories, he did not managed to integrate the first team. After being released by Hà Nội, he joined Vietnamese Second Division team Thanh Niên Sài Gòn in 2014. As the club failed to promote to the V.League 2, Đình Triệu quit football to study Information technology in Ho Chi Minh City University of Transport and later worked as a gas corporation employee.

== Club career ==
=== Bình Phước ===
After his early retirement, Đình Triệu continued playing in amateur teams. He impressed Bình Phước's manager Nguyễn Minh Phương during a local football tournament in Vũng Tàu, who later demanded the club to sign him. In 2020, Đình Triệu made his comeback as a professional footballer at the age of 28 after signing for V.League 2 club Bình Phước.

=== Hải Phòng ===
Đình Triệu joined V.League 1 side Hải Phòng in 2022. Although he was expected to be the back-up of Nguyễn Văn Toản, Đình Triệu quickly became the starter keeper of the team after his solid performances. With 6 clean sheets after 20 league games, Đình Triệu played a big role on helping Hải Phòng finish as league runners-up that season and was awarded the best goalkeeper title.

=== Công An Nhân Dân ===
After his contract with Hải Phòng ended, Đình Triệu moved to V.League 2 club Công An Nhân Dân.

== International career ==
Nguyễn Đình Triệu was named in Vietnam U19 squad for the 2010 AFC U-19 Championship.

In June 2023, Đình Triệu was called up to the senior Vietnam squad for first time, for friendlies against Hong Kong and Syria. He made his debut against Palestine on 11 September 2023 at the Thiên Trường Stadium, Nam Định. He kept a clean sheet in the match, which ended 2–0 to Vietnam.

In January 2024, he was included in Vietnam's 26-men squad for the 2023 AFC Asian Cup.

In December 2024, Đình Triệu was included in Vietnam's final squad for the 2024 ASEAN Championship. He was chosen as the starter goalkeeper, ahead of Nguyễn Filip. With his solid performances, he helped Vietnam win the title and was named as the Best goalkeeper of the tournament.

== Career statistics ==
=== Club ===
As of match played 22 October 2026

Appearances and goals by club, season and competition
| Club | Season | League | | | National cup | | Continental | | Other | | Total | |
| Club | Season | Division | Apps | Goals | Apps | Goals | Apps | Goals | Apps | Goals | Apps | Goals |
|---|---|---|---|---|---|---|---|---|---|---|---|---|
| Thanh Niên Sài Gòn | 2014 | Second Division | 6 | 0 | — | | — | | — | | 6 | 0 |
| Bình Phước | 2020 | V.League 2 | 11 | 0 | 1 | 0 | — | | — | | 12 | 0 |
| Bình Phước | 2021 | V.League 2 | 6 | 0 | 0 | 0 | — | | — | | 6 | 0 |
| Bình Phước | Total | | 17 | 0 | 1 | 0 | 0 | 0 | 0 | 0 | 18 | 0 |
| Hải Phòng | 2022 | V.League 1 | 24 | 0 | 2 | 0 | — | | — | | 26 | 0 |
| Hải Phòng | 2023 | V.League 1 | 17 | 0 | 1 | 0 | — | | — | | 18 | 0 |
| Hải Phòng | 2023–24 | V.League 1 | 25 | 0 | 2 | 0 | 7 (Note: Two appearances in AFC Champions League, five appearances in AFC Cup) | 0 | — | | 34 | 0 |
| Hải Phòng | 2024–25 | V.League 1 | 21 | 0 | 2 | 0 | — | | — | | 23 | 0 |
| Hải Phòng | 2025–26 | V.League 1 | 23 | 0 | 1 | 0 | — | | — | | 24 | 0 |
| Hải Phòng | Total | | 110 | 0 | 8 | 0 | 7 | 0 | 0 | 0 | 125 | 0 |
| Công An Nhân Dân | 2026–27 | V.League 2 | 4 | 0 | 0 | 0 | — | | — | | 4 | 0 |
| Career total | | | 137 | 0 | 9 | 0 | 7 | 0 | 0 | 0 | 153 | 0 |

=== International ===
As of match played 25 March 2025

Appearances and goals by national team and year
| National team | Year | Apps | Goals |
|---|---|---|---|
| Vietnam | 2023 | 2 | 0 |
| Vietnam | 2024 | 5 | 0 |
| Vietnam | 2025 | 4 | 0 |
| Total | | 11 | 0 |

== Honours ==
Vietnam

- ASEAN Championship: 2024

Individual

- ASEAN Championship best goalkeeper: 2024
- ASEAN Championship All-Star XI: 2024
- V.League 1 Team of the Season: 2024–25

Orders

- Third-class Labor Order: 2025
