= Supachok Sarachat =

Thai footballer

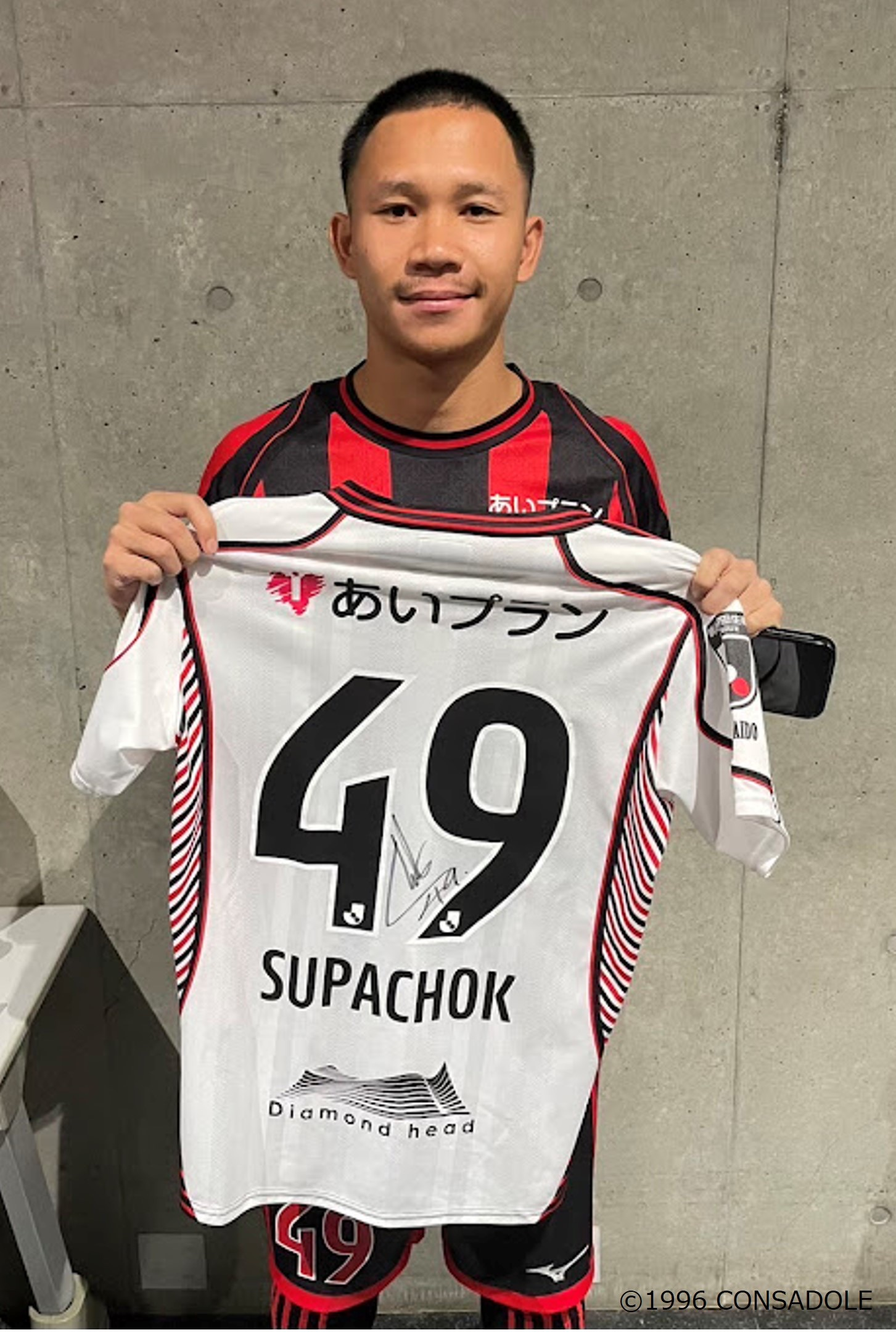
- Supachok holding up a Hokkaido Consadole Sapporo jersey in 2023

Personal information
- Full name: Supachok Sarachat
- Date of birth: 22 May 1998 (age 28)
- Place of birth: Sisaket, Thailand
- Height: 1.69 m (5 ft 7 in)
- Positions: Attacking midfielder; winger

Team information
- Current team: Hokkaido Consadole Sapporo
- Number: 7

Youth career
- 2011–2014: Buriram United

Senior career*
Years	Team	Apps	(Gls)
2015–2022	Buriram United	150	(35)
2015	→ Surin City (loan)	10	(2)
2022	→ Hokkaido Consadole Sapporo (loan)	7	(0)
2023–	Hokkaido Consadole Sapporo	89	(13)

International career^{‡}
2015–2016	Thailand U19	6	(0)
2017–2020	Thailand U23	11	(3)
2017–	Thailand	53	(12)
Medal record
Men's football
Representing Thailand
FIFA ASEAN Cup
Runner-up	2026 Indonesia	Team
ASEAN Championship
Winner	Suzuki Cup 2020	Team
Runner-up	Mitsubishi Electric Cup 2024	Team
- * Club domestic league appearances and goals as of 06:34, 15 June 2026 (UTC) ‡ National team caps and goals as of 17 November 2026

Supachok Sarachat (Thai: สุภโชค สารชาติ, pronounced [sù(p).pʰā.tɕʰôːk sǎː.rā.tɕʰâːt]; born 22 May 1998) is a Thai professional footballer who plays as an attacking midfielder or a winger for J2 League club Hokkaido Consadole Sapporo and the Thailand national team.

== Club career ==
=== Buriram United ===
Supachok switched to Hokkaido Consadole Sapporo on loan in July 2022 from Buriram United, for whom he has made 150 league appearances in total, scoring 35 goals and providing seven assists. Last season for Buriram United, Supachok made 26 Thai League 1 appearances, scoring five goals, and providing five assists.

=== Hokkaido Consadole Sapporo ===
Supachok joined the club on loan from Buriram United on 1 July 2022. He featured in seven J1 League matches, coming off the bench in each match. Despite no starts, and earning just 93 minutes of action throughout the matches combined, he gave three assists. Having impressed enough, Supachok was permanently signed by Consadole on a five-year contract, which extends from 12 November 2022 to 31 December 2027.

== International career ==
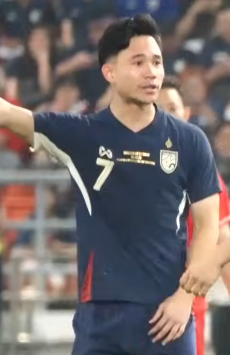
Supachok at the 2024 ASEAN Championship final

In 2021, Supachok was named in the Thailand squad for the 2020 AFF Championship by head coach, Alexandré Pölking in which he won the tournament and was named in the Team of the Tournament.

=== 2024 ASEAN Championship ===
Supachok and the Thailand national team participated in the 2024 AFF Championship and advanced to the final. Supachok scored a goal at Rajamangala Stadium, which raised the score to 2–1 for Thailand in the second leg of the final against Vietnam.

== Personal life ==
Supachok has two younger half-brothers: Suphanat Mueanta, currently playing for Japanese club RB Omiya Ardija, and Chotika Mueanta, a footballer playing for Buriram United youth squad. Supachok losts his father when he was very young and his mother remarried, hence the use of his mother's surname, Sarachat, while both Suphanat and Chotika use their father's surname, Mueanta.

== Career statistics ==
=== Club ===
As of 20 April 2024

Club	Season	League	League		National Cup		League Cup		Continental		Other		Total	
Club	Season	League	Apps	Goals	Apps	Goals	Apps	Goals	Apps	Goals	Apps	Goals	Apps	Goals
Surin City (loan)	2015	Thai Division 2	10	2	0	0	0	0	—		—		10	2
Buriram United	2015	Thai League 1	5	0	0	0	0	0	0	0	0	0	5	0
Buriram United	2016	Thai League 1	20	2	1	0	0	0	2 (Note: Appearance(s) in the AFC Champions League)	0	0	0	23	2
Buriram United	2017	Thai League 1	17	7	3	1	2	0	—		—		22	8
Buriram United	2018	Thai League 1	26	2	2	1	3	2	8	0	1 (Note: Appearance in Thailand Champions Cup)	0	40	5
Buriram United	2019	Thai League 1	29	9	5	1	5	1	6	1	1	0	46	12
Buriram United	2020–21	Thai League 1	20	9	3	2	—		2	0	—		25	11
Buriram United	2021–22	Thai League 1	26	5	5	2	4	1	—		—		35	8
Consadole Sapporo (loan)	2022	J1 League	7	0	0	0	0	0	—		—		7	0
Consadole Sapporo	2023	J1 League	24	7	3	2	4	2	—		—		31	11
Consadole Sapporo	2024	J1 League	19	2	0	0	2	0	—		—		21	2
Career total			203	45	22	9	20	6	18	1	2	0	265	61

=== International ===
As of 17 November 2026

National team	Year	Apps	Goals
Thailand	2017	1	0
Thailand	2019	7	2
Thailand	2021	8	3
Thailand	2022	4	1
Thailand	2023	8	1
Thailand	2024	10	2
Thailand	2025	10	2
Thailand	2026	5	1
Thailand	Total	53	12

Supachok Sarachat – goals for Thailand
#	Date	Venue	Opponent	Score	Result	Competition
1.	10 September 2019	Gelora Bung Karno Stadium, Jakarta, Indonesia	Indonesia	1–0	3–0	2022 FIFA World Cup qualification
2.	10 September 2019	Gelora Bung Karno Stadium, Jakarta, Indonesia	Indonesia	3–0	3–0	2022 FIFA World Cup qualification
3.	5 December 2021	National Stadium, Kallang, Singapore	Timor-Leste	2–0	2–0	2020 AFF Championship
4.	11 December 2021	National Stadium, Kallang, Singapore	Myanmar	4–0	4–0	2020 AFF Championship
5.	29 December 2021	National Stadium, Kallang, Singapore	Indonesia	3–0	4–0	2020 AFF Championship
6.	25 September 2022	700th Anniversary Stadium, Chiang Mai, Thailand	Trinidad and Tobago	2–1	2–1	2022 King's Cup
7.	21 November 2023	National Stadium, Kallang, Singapore	Singapore	1–0	3–1	2026 FIFA World Cup qualification
8.	30 January 2024	Al Janoub Stadium, Al Wakrah, Qatar	Uzbekistan	1–1	1–2	2023 AFC Asian Cup
9.	6 June 2024	Shenyang Olympic Sports Centre Stadium, Shenyang, China	China	1–0	1–1	2026 FIFA World Cup qualification
10.	5 January 2025	Rajamangala Stadium, Bangkok, Thailand	Vietnam	2–1	2–3	2024 ASEAN Championship
11.	14 October 2025	Taipei Municipal Stadium, Taipei, Taiwan	Chinese Taipei	3–0	6–1	2027 AFC Asian Cup qualification
12.	17 November 2026	Sisaket Province Stadium, Sisaket, Thailand	Tajikistan	1–0	3–0	2026 King's Cup

== Honours ==
Buriram United

- Thai League 1: 2015, 2017, 2018, 2021–22
- Thai FA Cup: 2015, 2021–22
- Thai League Cup: 2015, 2016, 2021–22
- Thailand Champions Cup: 2019
- Toyota Premier Cup: 2016
- Mekong Club Championship: 2015, 2016

Thailand

- AFF Championship: 2020
- King's Cup: 2026

Individual

- FA Thailand Young player of the Year: 2017
- 2020 AFF Championship: Team of the Tournament
