= Phạm Xuân Mạnh =

Vietnamese footballer

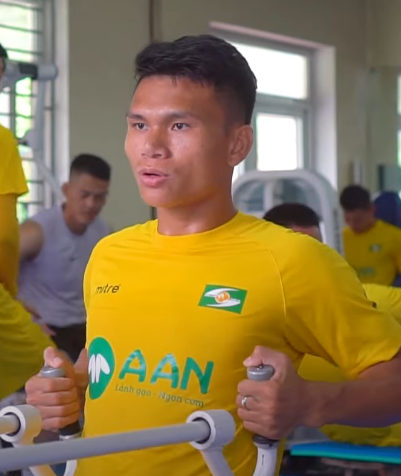
- Xuân Mạnh in 2021

Personal information
- Full name: Phạm Xuân Mạnh
- Date of birth: 9 February 1996 (age 30)
- Place of birth: Yên Thành, Nghệ An, Vietnam
- Height: 1.75 m (5 ft 9 in)
- Positions: Right-back; center-back; defensive midfielder

Team information
- Current team: Hà Nội
- Number: 7

Youth career
- 2008–2015: Sông Lam Nghệ An

Senior career*
Years	Team	Apps	(Gls)
2015–2023	Sông Lam Nghệ An	127	(5)
2015	→ Công An Nhân Dân (loan)	13	(3)
2023–	Hà Nội	75	(9)

International career^{‡}
2018–2019	Vietnam U23	11	(0)
2018–	Vietnam	37	(3)
Medal record
Men's football
Representing Vietnam
AFC U-23 Championship
Runner-up	China 2018
ASEAN Championship
Winner	ASEAN 2024
Winner	ASEAN 2026
- * Club domestic league appearances and goals as of 30 October 2026 ‡ National team caps and goals as of 5 October 2026

Phạm Xuân Mạnh (born 9 February 1996) is a Vietnamese professional footballer who plays as a right-back, center-back or defensive midfielder for V.League 1 club Hà Nội and the Vietnam national team.

== Club career ==
=== Sông Lam Nghệ An ===
Xuân Mạnh rosed through the youth ranks at Sông Lam Nghệ An, becoming a regular after a loan to Công An Nhân Dân, and won 2017 Vietnamese Cup with the club.

On 25 August 2023, Sông Lam Nghệ An announced their parting with Xuân Mạnh, marking the end of a decade-long association with him. In total, he played 148 games and scored 8 goals for SLNA.

=== Hà Nội ===
On 28 August 2023, fellow V.League 1 club Hà Nội announced the signing of Xuân Mạnh. He made his competitive debut for the club on 20 September against Pohang Steelers in the AFC Champions League, which Hanoi lost 4–2. At the end of 2023, Xuân Mạnh officially extended his contract with Hà Nội until 2027.

On 28 February 2024, Xuân Mạnh scored his first goal for the club in a 3–2 away loss to Thép Xanh Nam Định.

== International career ==
Xuân Mạnh also enjoyed considerable success at youth level for Vietnam, being part of the squad which ended as runners-up in the 2018 AFC U-23 Championship. He appeared in all knockout stage matches as the starter left wing back to replace the injured Đoàn Văn Hậu.

On 27 March 2018, he made his senior international debut against Jordan.

Xuân Mạnh was included in Vietnam's squad for 2023 AFC Asian Cup in Qatar. He was named in the starting lineup in all three of Vietnam's matches at the tournament.

He scored his first international goal on 9 October 2025 against Nepal during the 2027 AFC Asian Cup qualification at the Gò Đậu Stadium.

== Personal life ==
Phạm Xuân Mạnh married Trần Thị Dung in 2021. They have a daughter and a son.

== Career statistics ==
=== Club ===
As of match played 30 October 2026

Appearances and goals by club, season and competition
Club	Season	League			National cup		Continental		Other		Total	
Club	Season	Division	Apps	Goals	Apps	Goals	Apps	Goals	Apps	Goals	Apps	Goals
Công An Nhân Dân (loan)	2015	V.League 2	13	3	2	0	—		—		15	3
Sông Lam Nghệ An	2016	V.League 1	15	0	2	0	—		—		17	0
Sông Lam Nghệ An	2017	V.League 1	22	0	6	1	—		—		28	1
Sông Lam Nghệ An	2018	V.League 1	18	1	4	1	5 (Note: Appearances in AFC Cup)	1	1 (Note: Appearance in Vietnamese Super Cup)	0	28	3
Sông Lam Nghệ An	2019	V.League 1	15	1	1	0	—		—		16	1
Sông Lam Nghệ An	2020	V.League 1	6	0	0	0	—		—		6	0
Sông Lam Nghệ An	2021	V.League 1	11	0	0	0	—		—		11	0
Sông Lam Nghệ An	2022	V.League 1	23	3	1	0	—		—		24	3
Sông Lam Nghệ An	2023	V.League 1	17	0	1	0	—		—		18	0
Sông Lam Nghệ An	Total		127	5	15	2	5	1	1	0	148	8
Hà Nội	2023–24	V.League 1	25	3	4	0	6 (Note: Appearances in AFC Champions League)	0	—		35	3
Hà Nội	2024–25	V.League 1	18	1	1	0	—		—		19	1
Hà Nội	2025–26	V.League 1	26	4	0	0	—		—		26	4
Hà Nội	2026–27	V.League 1	6	1	1	0	—		—		7	1
Hà Nội	Total		75	9	6	0	6	0	0	0	87	9
Career total			207	17	22	2	11	1	1	0	250	20

=== International ===
As of match played 26 September 2026

Appearances and goals by national team and year
National team	Year	Apps	Goals
Vietnam	2018	1	0
Vietnam	2021	2	0
Vietnam	2022	1	0
Vietnam	2023	1	0
Vietnam	2024	12	0
Vietnam	2025	7	1
Vietnam	2026	11	2
Total		35	3

List of international goals scored by Phạm Xuân Mạnh
No.	Date	Venue	Opponent	Score	Result	Competition
1.	9 October 2025	Gò Đậu Stadium, Hồ Chí Minh City, Vietnam	Nepal	2–1	3–1	2027 AFC Asian Cup qualification
2.	26 March 2026	Hàng Đẫy Stadium, Hanoi, Vietnam	Bangladesh	2–0	3–0	Friendly
3.	18 July 2026	Thái Nguyên Stadium, Thái Nguyên, Vietnam	Myanmar	2–0	4–0	Friendly

== Honours ==
Sông Lam Nghệ An

- Vietnamese Cup: 2017

Vietnam U23

- AFC U-23 Championship runners-up: 2018

Vietnam

- ASEAN Championship: 2024, 2026

Individual

- V.League 1 Team of the Season: 2025–26
