= Pansa Hemviboon =

Thai footballer (born 1990)

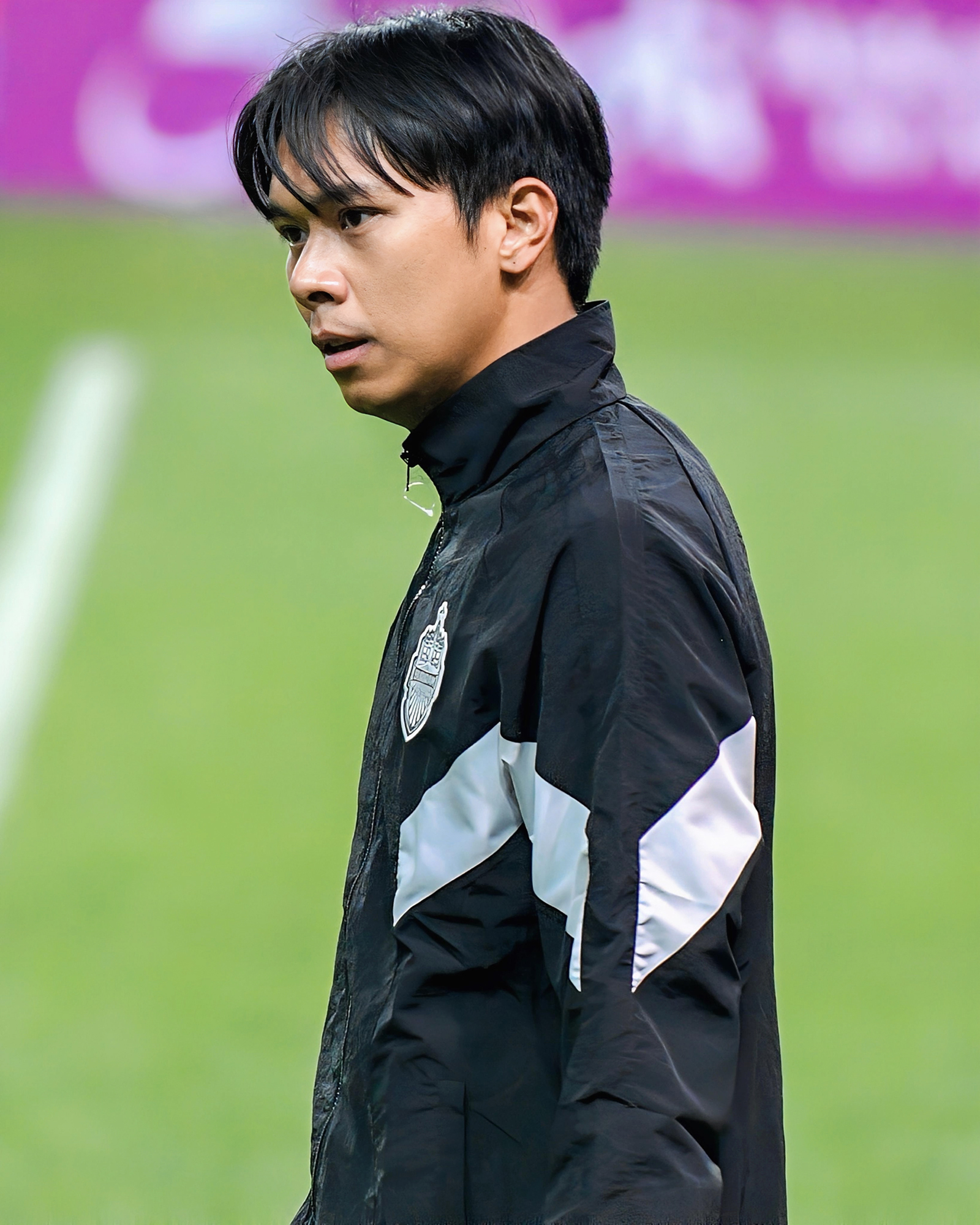
- Pansa with Buriram United in 2025

Personal information
- Full name: Pansa Hemviboon
- Date of birth: 8 July 1990 (age 36)
- Place of birth: Chanthaburi, Thailand
- Height: 1.91 m (6 ft 3 in)
- Position: Centre back

Team information
- Current team: Buriram United
- Number: 3

Youth career
- 2006–2008: Bangkok Christian College
- 2009–2011: Chulalongkorn University

Senior career*
Years	Team	Apps	(Gls)
2012–2013	Chamchuri United	29	(2)
2014–2015	TOT	7	(0)
2015–2016	Khon Kaen United	14	(0)
2016–	Buriram United	210	(12)

International career^{‡}
2017–2026	Thailand	59	(7)
Medal record
Thailand
ASEAN Championship
Winner	ASEAN 2022	Team
Runner-up	ASEAN 2024	Team
Runner-up	ASEAN 2026	Team
- * Club domestic league appearances and goals as of 14:21, 6 January 2025 (UTC) ‡ National team caps and goals as of 22 August 2026

Pansa Hemviboon (Thai: พรรษา เหมวิบูลย์, born 8 July 1990) is a Thai professional footballer who plays as a centre back for Thai League 1 club Buriram United and the Thailand national team.

== International career ==
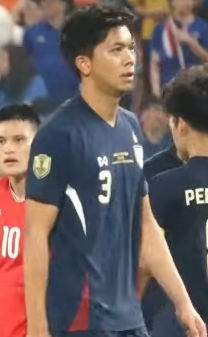
Pansa playing for Thailand at the 2024 ASEAN Championship final

In March, 2018 he was in the squad of Thailand for 2018 King's Cup. He was called up by Thailand national team for the 2018 AFF Suzuki Cup.

Pansa was named for the final squad in 2019 AFC Asian Cup.

== Personal life ==
Pansa was born and spent much of his childhood in Chanthaburi, a province known for its gemstone, where his parents both worked as a lapidarist. As his family had limited income, Pansa sometimes had to feed himself with free Thai government school milk, which inadvertently helped him build the physique that he's known as a footballer.

He has a bachelor's degree in sports science from Chulalongkorn University.

== International goals ==
Scores and results list Thailand's goal tally first.

#	Date	Venue	Opponent	Score	Result	Competition
1.	25 March 2018	Rajamangala National Stadium, Bangkok, Thailand	Slovakia	2–3	2–3	2018 King's Cup
2.	17 November 2018	Rajamangala National Stadium, Bangkok, Thailand	Indonesia	2–1	4–2	2018 AFF Championship
3.	25 November 2018	Rajamangala National Stadium, Bangkok, Thailand	Singapore	1–0	3–0	2018 AFF Championship
4.	5 December 2018	Rajamangala National Stadium, Bangkok, Thailand	Malaysia	2–1	2–2	2018 AFF Championship
5.	8 June 2022	Markaziy Stadium, Namangan, Uzbekistan	Maldives	3–0	3–0	2023 AFC Asian Cup qualification
6.	22 September 2022	700th Anniversary Stadium, Chiang Mai, Thailand	Malaysia	1–1	1–1 (3–5 p)	2022 King's Cup
7.	18 November 2025	Colombo Racecourse, Colombo, Sri Lanka	Sri Lanka	3–0	4–0	2027 AFC Asian Cup qualification

== Honours ==
Buriram United

- Thai League 1: 2017, 2018, 2021–22, 2022–23, 2023–24, 2024–25
- Thai FA Cup: 2021–22, 2022–23, 2024–25
- Thai League Cup: 2021–22, 2022–23, 2024–25
- Thailand Champions Cup: 2019
- ASEAN Club Championship: 2024–25

Thailand

- AFF Championship: 2022

Individual

- FA Thailand Men's Player of the Year: 2017
- ASEAN Championship Best XI: 2024
- ASEAN Club Championship: Allstar XI 2025–26
