= Glenn Kweh =

Singaporean footballer

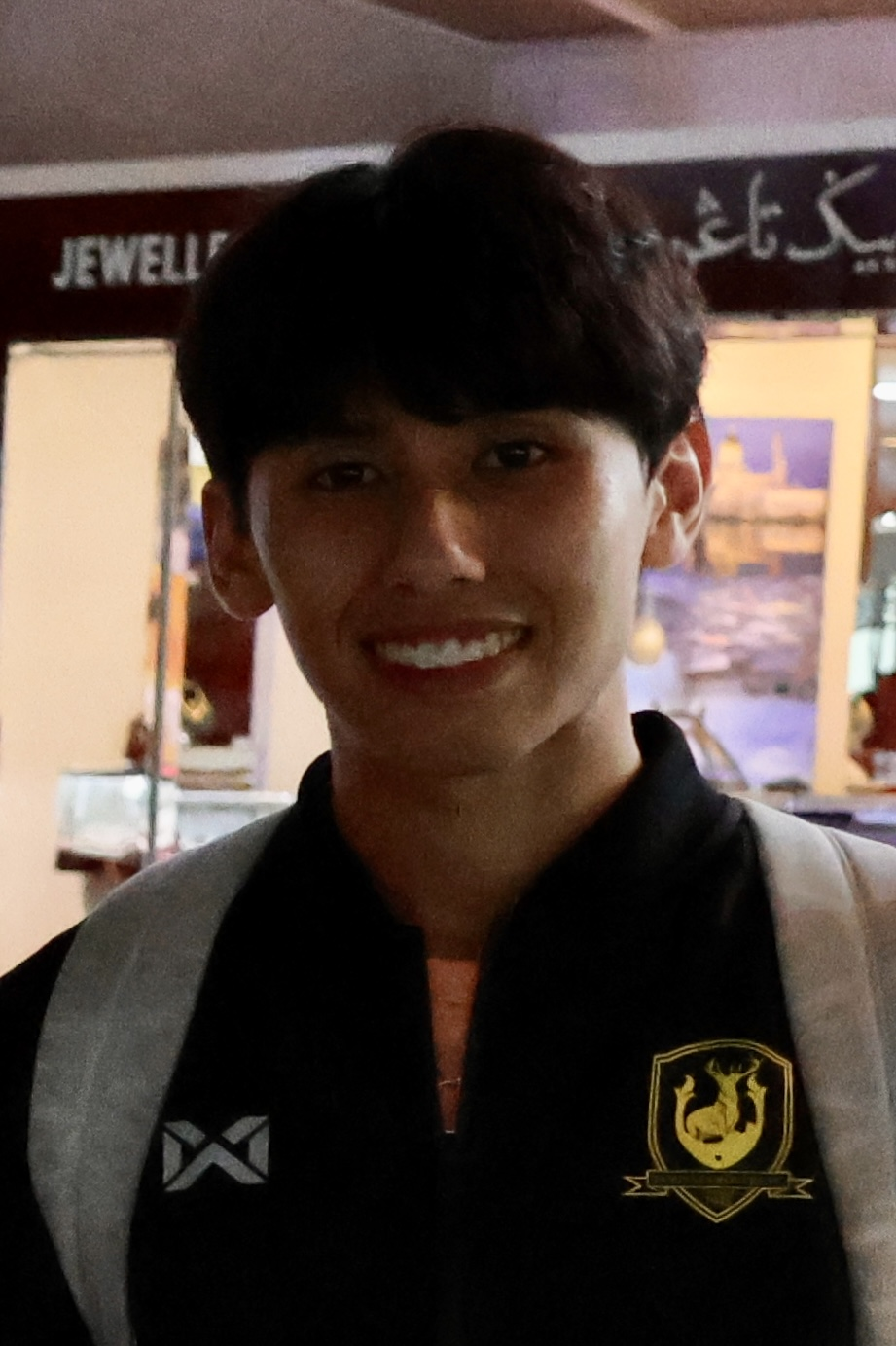
- Glenn in 2024

Personal information
- Full name: Glenn Kweh Jia Jin
- Date of birth: 26 March 2000 (age 26)
- Place of birth: Singapore
- Height: 1.72 m (5 ft 8 in)
- Position: Winger

Team information
- Current team: Lion City Sailors
- Number: 11

Youth career
- Home United
- National Football Academy
- 2013–2016: Victoria School
- 2017–2018: Victoria Junior College

Senior career*
Years	Team	Apps	(Gls)
2021–2022	Young Lions	37	(4)
2023–2026	Tampines Rovers	73	(14)
2026–	Lion City Sailors	2	(0)

International career^{‡}
2021–2023	Singapore U23	9	(3)
2022–	Singapore	40	(2)
- * Club domestic league appearances and goals as of 1 November 2026 ‡ National team caps and goals as of 1 October 2026

Glenn Kweh Jia Jin (born 26 March 2000) is a Singaporean professional footballer who plays as a winger for Singapore Premier League club Lion City Sailors and the Singapore national team.

== Education ==
A former Victoria School student, Glenn went on to play for Victoria Junior College (VJC) from 2017 to 2018. In the 2017 edition of the National School Games A-Division Football Competition, Glenn helped VJC to the runner-up spot and finished as the Golden Boot winner with 18 goals, including a goal in the semi-final against Anglo-Chinese Junior College. He went on to win the A-Division Football Title for VJC the following year. He graduated from the National University of Singapore with a degree in business administration in 2024.

== Club career ==
=== Early career ===
Glenn was the captain of the Home United U14 team and also played for the National Football Academy’s U15 team. He was also nominated for the Dollah Kassim Award in 2015.

=== Young Lions ===
Glenn signed with the Singapore Premier League club Young Lions in 2021. Glenn scored on his debut just three minutes after coming on in a league match against Hougang United on 17 April 2021. He appeared only 10 times, only three of which being starts in the 2021 Singapore Premier League season.

=== Tampines Rovers ===
On 7 January 2023, Glenn moved to Tampines Rovers after he completed his compulsory national services obligation. He scored his first goal for the club 15 August 2023 in a 3–1 win over Balestier Khalsa.

On 18 September 2024, Glenn make his AFC Champions League Two debut in a 4–2 lost to Thailand club Bangkok United. On 24 October, he assisted twice helping his team to a 3–3 draw to Vietnamese club Nam Định.

On 19 October 2025, Glenn scored a brace in a 3–3 league draw to Balestier Khalsa. He scored his first AFC Champions League Two goals against Korean club Pohang Steelers on 6 November at the Pohang Steel Yard stadium where he ran from his half and slotting the ball right in between the goalkeeper legs.

=== Lion City Sailors ===
On 14 July 2026, it was announced that Glenn would join Lion City Sailors from Tampines Rovers on a two-year contract.

== International career ==
Glenn was first called up to the Singapore national team in 2022, for the friendly against Kuwait on 1 June 2022 and the AFC Asian Cup Qualifiers against Kyrgyzstan, Tajikistan, and Myanmar on 8, 11, and 14 June 2022 respectively. Glenn made his international debut on 1 June 2022 against Kuwait in the 60th minute, replacing Ikhsan Fandi.

Glenn was also included in the 2022 VFF Tri-Nations Series tournament against Vietnam and India on 21 and 24 September.

During the international friendly match against both Oceania countries, Papua New Guinea and Solomon Islands in June 2023, Glenn was shifted down to play at left back under head coach Takayuki Nishigaya.

On 13 November 2025, Glenn scored a brace in a 3–2 loss to Thailand in a friendly match.

== Personal life ==
Glenn served his National Service (NS) obligations for the Singapore Armed Forces (SAF) from 2019 to 2021 where he completed his Specialist Cadet School (SCS) as a Sergeant after his Basic Military Training (BMT).

== Career statistics ==
=== Club ===
As of match played 18 Apr 2023.

Appearances and goals by club, season and competition
Club	Season	League			National Cup		League Cup		Continental		Total	
Club	Season	Division	Apps	Goals	Apps	Goals	Apps	Goals	Apps	Goals	Apps	Goals
Young Lions	2021	Singapore Premier League	10	2	0	0	0	0	—		10	2
Young Lions	2022	Singapore Premier League	27	2	1	0	0	0	—		28	2
Young Lions	Total		37	4	1	0	0	0	0	0	38	4
Tampines Rovers	2023	Singapore Premier League	23	1	7	0	0	0	1	0	31	1
Tampines Rovers	2024–25	Singapore Premier League	32	7	7	1	0	0	6	0	45	8
Tampines Rovers	2025–26	Singapore Premier League	18	6	3	0	1	0	15 (Note: 10 in AFC Elite 2, 5 in Shopee Cup)	1 (Note: 1 in AFC Elite 2)	37	7
Tampines Rovers	Total		68	13	17	1	1	0	22	1	113	16
Career total			105	17	18	1	1	0	22	1	146	19

- Young Lions are ineligible for qualification to AFC competitions in their respective leagues.

=== International goals ===
#	Date	Venue	Opponent	Score	Result	Competition
1.	13 November 2025	Thammasat Stadium, Pathum Thani, Thailand	Thailand	1–1	2–3	Friendly
2.	13 November 2025	Thammasat Stadium, Pathum Thani, Thailand	Thailand	2–3	2–3	Friendly

== Honours ==
=== Tampines Rovers ===
- Singapore Community Shield: 2025
