= Doãn Ngọc Tân =

Vietnamese footballer (born 1994)

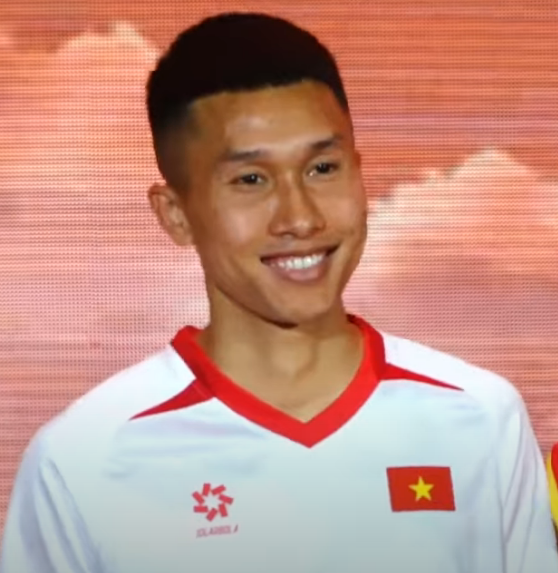
- Ngọc Tân in 2025

Personal information
- Full name: Doãn Ngọc Tân
- Date of birth: 15 August 1994 (age 32)
- Place of birth: Sơn Tây, Hanoi, Vietnam
- Height: 1.69 m (5 ft 7 in)
- Position: Defensive midfielder

Team information
- Current team: Thể Công–Viettel
- Number: 34

Youth career
- –2012: Hà Nội ACB
- 2012–2014: Viettel

Senior career*
Years	Team	Apps	(Gls)
2015–2020	Hải Phòng	79	(6)
2016	→ Hồ Chí Minh City (loan)		
2021–2026	Đông Á Thanh Hóa	104	(4)
2026–	Thể Công–Viettel	2	(0)

International career^{‡}
2024–	Vietnam	8	(1)
Medal record
Men's football
Representing Vietnam
ASEAN Championship
Winner	ASEAN 2024
- * Club domestic league appearances and goals as of 10 September 2026 ‡ National team caps and goals as of 19 March 2025

Doãn Ngọc Tân (born 15 August 1994) is a Vietnamese professional footballer who plays as a defensive midfielder for V.League 1 club Thể Công–Viettel.

== Club career ==
Ngọc Tân began his senior career at V.League 1 side Hải Phòng.

In the second half of the 2016 season, Ngọc Tân was loaned to V.League 2 club Hồ Chí Minh City and won the league with the team.

In 2021, he signed for Thanh Hóa and immediately became a crucial player for the team. He contributed in the 2023 Vietnamese Cup winning campaign of the team, and captained the team in the following season to win their second Vietnamese Cup title in a row.

In July 2026, Ngọc Tân moved to league fellow Thể Công–Viettel.

== International career ==
Ngọc Tân was called up to the Vietnam national team squad for the 2024 ASEAN Championship. He made his international debut on 9 December 2024 in a 4–1 win against Laos. On 18 December, he scored a last-minute equalizer against Philippines.

== Career statistics ==
=== International ===
As of match played 5 January 2025

Appearances and goals by national team and year
National team	Year	Apps	Goals
Vietnam	2024	5	1
Vietnam	2025	2	0
Total		7	1

Scores and results list Vietnam's goal tally first, score column indicates score after each Ngọc Tân goal.

List of international goals scored by Doãn Ngọc Tân
No.	Date	Venue	Opponent	Score	Result	Competition
1.	18 December 2024	Rizal Memorial Stadium, Manila, Philippines	Philippines	1–1	1–1	2024 ASEAN Championship

== Honours ==
Hồ Chí Minh City

- V.League 2: 2016

Đông Á Thanh Hóa

- Vietnamese National Cup: 2023, 2023–24
- Vietnamese Super Cup: 2023

Vietnam

- ASEAN Championship: 2024
