= Việt Trì Stadium =

Stadium in Phú Thọ province, Vietnam

Viet Tri Stadium
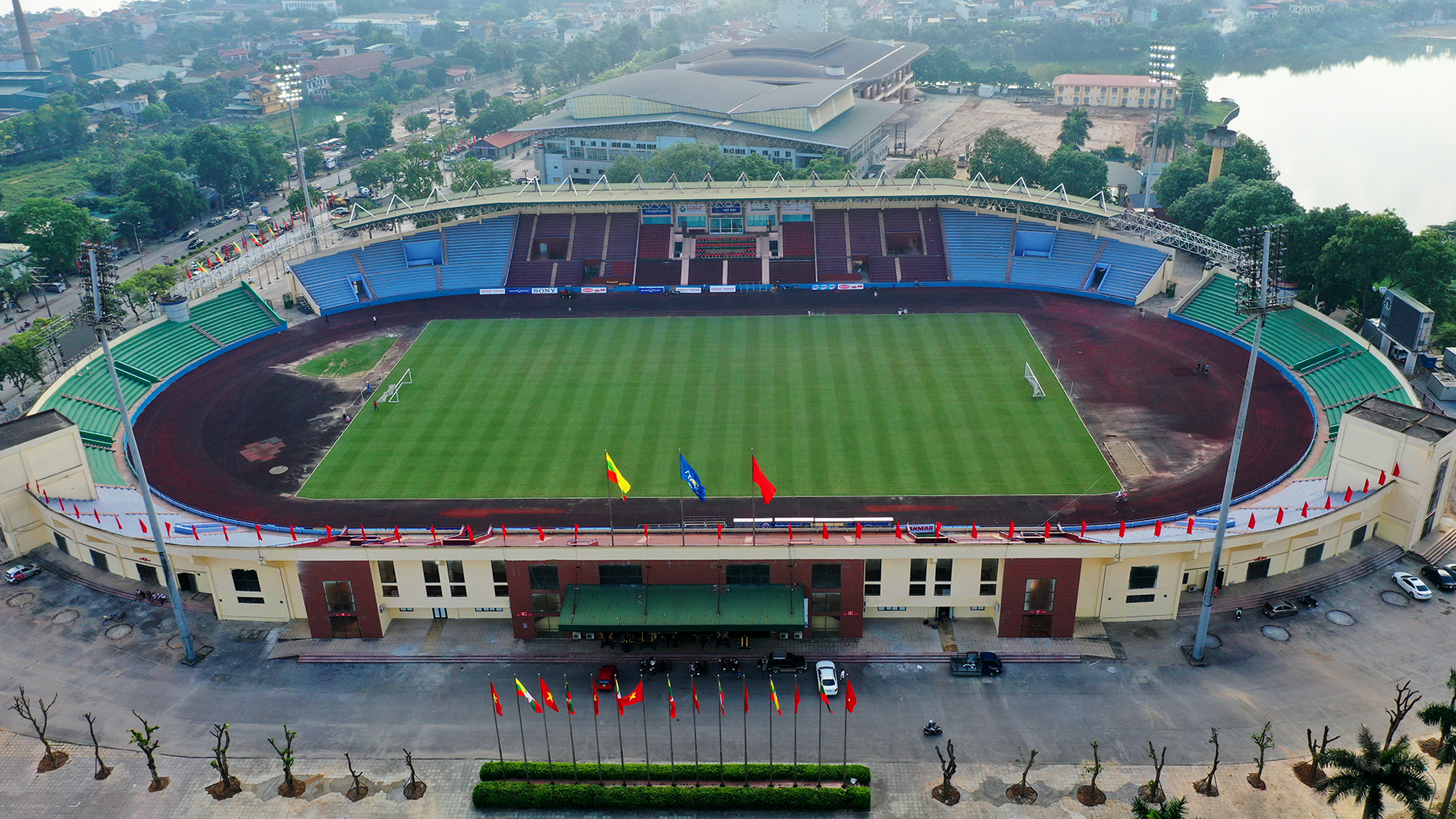
- Viet Tri Stadium from fly-cam above
- Interactive map of Viet Tri Stadium
- Address: Hùng Vương Street, Thanh Miếu ward Phú Thọ; Vietnam
- Coordinates: 21.3054°N 105.4133°E
- Owner: People's Committee of Phú Thọ Province
- Capacity: 20,000

Construction
- Groundbreaking: 1960
- Built: 1960
- Renovated: 2005; April 2019
- Cost: ₫100,000,000,000

Tenants
- Vietnam national football team (selected matches); Xuân Thiện Phú Thọ Football Club

Việt Trì Stadium is an association football stadium located in Thanh Miếu ward, Phú Thọ province, Vietnam. This stadium, with a capacity of nearly 20,000 seats, is located in the premises of the Sports Complex of Phú Thọ province. The stadium is the home ground of Xuân Thiện Phú Thọ FC. The stadium was one of the host stadiums for the 2021 SEA Games and the 2024 ASEAN Championship.

== History ==
Việt Trì Stadium has existed since the 1960s. In 2005, it was invested and built by the People's Committee of Phú Thọ province with an investment of about 100 billion VND. Due to many years without a major tournament, many items of the yard have deteriorated. However, in recent years, the sport movement has received the attention of the Provincial Party Committee and the People's Committee of Phú Thọ province, especially strongly investing in football. In April 2019, the province focused resources on repairing and upgrading Việt Trì Stadium's facilities and a number of other necessary sports items and institutions, serving the sports needs of the people and host domestic and international football matches. After being renovated, the stadium hosted an international friendly match between Vietnam U23 and Myanmar U23 on June 7, 2019; It is also the venue for the matches of Phú Thọ Football Club in Vietnamese League Three 2019, Vietnamese League Two 2020.

Việt Trì Stadium hosted Group A in men's football at the 2021 SEA Games. It also hosted all home matches at the 2024 ASEAN Championship including the finals.

There are currently plans to expand the capacity of the stadium from 20,000 seats to 35,000 seats.

== International football matches ==
=== 2021 SEA Games ===
Date	Time (UTC+07)	Team #1	Res.	Team #2	Round	Attendance
6 May 2022	16:00	Philippines	4–0	Timor-Leste	Group Stage	5,373
6 May 2022	19:00	Vietnam	3–0	Indonesia	Group Stage	16,188
8 May 2022	16:00	Timor-Leste	2–3	Myanmar	Group Stage	3,568
8 May 2022	19:00	Vietnam	0–0	Philippines	Group Stage	16,585
10 May 2022	16:00	Myanmar	3–2	Philippines	Group Stage	1,268
10 May 2022	19:00	Indonesia	4–1	Timor-Leste	Group Stage	3,133
13 May 2022	16:00	Philippines	0–4	Indonesia	Group Stage	2,661
13 May 2022	19:00	Myanmar	0–1	Vietnam	Group Stage	15,975
15 May 2022	16:00	Indonesia	3–1	Myanmar	Group Stage	2,519
15 May 2022	19:00	Timor-Leste	0–2	Vietnam	Group Stage	14,160
19 May 2022	19:00	Vietnam	1–0	Malaysia	Semi-finals	17,895

=== 2023 AFC U-17 Asian Cup qualification ===
Date	Time (UTC+7)	Team #1	Result	Team #2	Round	Attendance
5 October 2022	16:00	Thailand	3–0	Nepal	Group F	N/A
5 October 2022	19:00	Vietnam	4–0	Chinese Taipei	Group F	N/A
7 October 2022	16:00	Chinese Taipei	1–3	Thailand	Group F	N/A
7 October 2022	19:00	Nepal	0–5	Vietnam	Group F	N/A
9 October 2022	16:00	Chinese Taipei	4–2	Nepal	Group F	N/A
9 October 2022	19:00	Thailand	0–3	Vietnam	Group F	N/A

=== 2024 AFC U-23 Asian Cup qualification ===
Date	Time (UTC+7)	Team #1	Result	Team #2	Round	Attendance
6 September 2023	16:00	Singapore	0–3	Yemen	Group C	1,326
6 September 2023	19:00	Vietnam	6–0	Guam	Group C	7,289
9 September 2023	16:00	Guam	1–1	Singapore	Group C	1,238
9 September 2023	19:00	Yemen	0–1	Vietnam	Group C	12,168
12 September 2023	16:00	Yemen	5–1	Guam	Group C	826
12 September 2023	19:00	Vietnam	2–2	Singapore	Group C	11,268

=== 2025 AFC U-17 Asian Cup qualification ===
Date	Time (UTC+7)	Team #1	Result	Team #2	Round	Attendance
23 October 2024	16:00	Yemen	6–1	Myanmar	Group I	268
23 October 2024	19:00	Vietnam	0–0	Kyrgyzstan	Group I	7,538
25 October 2024	16:00	Kyrgyzstan	2–3	Yemen	Group I	469
25 October 2024	19:00	Myanmar	0–2	Vietnam	Group I	7,136
27 October 2024	16:00	Kyrgyzstan	1–2	Myanmar	Group I	289
27 October 2024	19:00	Yemen	0–0	Vietnam	Group I	4,823

=== 2024 ASEAN Championship ===
Date	Time (UTC+07)	Team #1	Res.	Team #2	Round	Attendance
15 December 2024	20:00	Vietnam	1–0	Indonesia	Group Stage	16,669
21 December 2024	20:00	Vietnam	5–0	Myanmar	Group Stage	16,869
29 December 2024	20:00	Vietnam	3–1	Singapore	Semifinals second leg	15,583
2 January 2025	20:00	Vietnam	2–1	Thailand	Final first leg	15,604

=== 2026 AFC Women's Asian Cup qualification ===
Date	Time (UTC+7)	Team #1	Result	Team #2	Round	Attendance
29 June 2025	16:00	Guam	0–0	United Arab Emirates	Group E	N/A
29 June 2025	19:00	Vietnam	7–0	Maldives	Group E	N/A
2 July 2025	16:00	Maldives	0–3	Guam	Group E	N/A
2 July 2025	19:00	United Arab Emirates	0–6	Vietnam	Group E	N/A
5 July 2025	16:00	United Arab Emirates	5–0	Maldives	Group E	N/A
5 July 2025	19:00	Vietnam	4–0	Guam	Group E	N/A

=== 2026 AFC U-23 Asian Cup qualification ===
Date	Time (UTC+7)	Team #1	Result	Team #2	Round	Attendance
3 September 2025	16:00	Yemen	2–1	Singapore	Group C	322
3 September 2025	19:00	Vietnam	2–0	Bangladesh	Group C	3,019
6 September 2025	16:00	Bangladesh	0–1	Yemen	Group C	365
6 September 2025	19:00	Singapore	0–1	Vietnam	Group C	6,046
9 September 2025	16:00	Singapore	1–4	Bangladesh	Group C	459
9 September 2025	19:00	Vietnam	1–0	Yemen	Group C	6,879
