= 2024 ASEAN Championship Group A =

Group A was one of the two groups of competing nations at the 2024 ASEAN Championship. It consisted of defending champions Thailand, Malaysia, Singapore, Cambodia, and East Timor. The matches were played from 8 to 20 December 2024.

Thailand and Singapore advanced to the semi-finals as the top two teams in the group. Thailand topped the group with four victories. Singapore advanced as runners-up, with two wins and a draw. Malaysia finished third, with one win and two draws, Cambodia finished fourth, with one win and a draw, while East Timor finished fifth without registering a single point.

== Teams ==
Draw position	Team	Appearance	Previous best performance	FIFA Ranking	
Draw position	Team	Appearance	Previous best performance	April 2024	November 2024
A1	Thailand	15th	Winners (1996, 2000, 2002, 2014, 2016, 2020, 2022)	101	97
A2	Malaysia	15th	Winners (2010)	138	132
A3	Singapore	15th	Winners (1998, 2004, 2007, 2012)	155	161
A4	Cambodia	10th	Group stage (All appearances)	179	180
A5	Timor-Leste	3rd	Group stage (All appearances)	198	196

== Standings ==
Pos	Team	Pld	W	D	L	GF	GA	GD	Pts	Qualification
1	Thailand	4	4	0	0	18	4	+14	12	Advance to knockout stage
2	Singapore	4	2	1	1	7	5	+2	7	Advance to knockout stage
3	Malaysia	4	1	2	1	5	5	0	5	
4	Cambodia	4	1	1	2	7	8	−1	4	
5	Timor-Leste	4	0	0	4	3	18	−15	0	Play qualification for the next edition

Source: ASEAN United FC

== Matches ==
=== Cambodia vs Malaysia ===
8 December 2024
17:45 UTC+7

Cambodia	2–2	Malaysia
Abdel Kader 52'; Ty 60'	Report	Wilkin 35'; Tierney 74'

Olympic Stadium, Phnom Penh
Attendance: 24,886
Referee: Kim Woo-sung (South Korea)

Cambodia	Malaysia

GK	21	Vireak Dara
CB	4	Kan Mo (c)
CB	5	Soeuy Visal	(substituted off) 57'
CB	15	Takaki Ose
DM	8	Orn Chanpolin
RM	13	Sareth Krya
CM	19	Kim Sokyuth	(substituted off) 70'
CM	6	Yudai Ogawa
LM	11	Nick Taylor
SS	9	Sieng Chanthea	(substituted off) 90+2'
CF	20	Abdel Kader	(substituted off) 70'
Substitutions:
FW	17	Sa Ty	(substituted on) 57'
MF	26	Min Ratanak	(substituted on) 70'
FW	23	Sor Rotana	(substituted on) 70'
FW	7	Lim Pisoth	(substituted on) 90+2'
Manager:
(Japan) Koji Gyotoku

GK	23	Haziq Nadzli
RB	5	Jimmy Raymond	(yellow card) 55'
CB	6	Dominic Tan
CB	3	Khuzaimi Piee		(substituted off) 61'
LB	4	Daniel Ting
CM	14	Syamer Kutty Abba (c)
CM	8	Stuart Wilkin		(substituted off) 90'
RW	20	Syafiq Ahmad		(substituted off) 46'
AM	10	Endrick
LW	17	Paulo Josué		(substituted off) 70'
CF	7	Haqimi Azim		(substituted off) 61'
Substitutions:
FW	9	Darren Lok		(substituted on) 46'
MF	16	Ezequiel Agüero		(substituted on) 61'
DF	25	Adib Ra'op		(substituted on) 61'
FW	22	Fergus Tierney		(substituted on) 70'
FW	19	G. Pavithran		(substituted on) 90'
Manager:
(Spain) Pau Martí

Assistant referees:
Park Sang-jun (South Korea)
Jeon Jin-hee (South Korea)
Fourth official:
Ahmad A'Qashah (Singapore)

Overall
Statistics	Cambodia	Malaysia
Goals scored	2	2
Total shots	13	12
Shots on target	2	5
Ball possession	46%	53%
Corner kicks	5	6
Fouls committed	11	8
Offsides	2	6
Yellow cards	0	1
Red cards	0	0

=== East Timor vs Thailand ===
8 December 2024
20:00 UTC+7

Timor-Leste	0–10	Thailand
	Report	Davis 4', 32'; Gustavsson 17'; Suphanat 28', 54'; Seksan 56', 61'; Teerasak 79', 90+2'; Mickelson 90+3'

Hàng Đẫy Stadium, Hanoi (Vietnam)
Attendance: 1,239
Referee: Kim Dae-yong (South Korea)

East Timor	Thailand

GK	20	Junildo Pereira		(substituted off) 61'
RB	5	João Panji
CB	18	Filomeno Junior		(substituted off) 73'
CB	23	Anizo Correia
LB	19	Yohanes Gusmão		(substituted off) 73'
CM	11	Zenivio		(substituted off) 61'
CM	15	Santiago da Costa
CM	9	Olagar Xavier	(yellow card) 68'
AM	8	Claudio Osorio
CF	10	João Pedro (c)
CF	3	Kenny Ximenes		(substituted off) 69'
Substitutions:
DF	4	Francisco da Costa		(substituted on) 61'
GK	1	Georgino Mendonça		(substituted on) 61'
FW	7	Elias Mesquita		(substituted on) 69'
DF	22	Nelson Viegas		(substituted on) 73'
MF	16	Freteliano		(substituted on) 73'
Manager:
(Chile) Simón Elissetche

GK	23	Korrakot Pipatnadda
RB	2	James Beresford	(substituted off) 88'
CB	3	Pansa Hemviboon (c)
CB	15	Saringkan Promsupa
LB	12	Nicholas Mickelson
CM	19	William Weidersjö	(substituted off) 88'
CM	16	Akarapong Pumwisat	(substituted off) 76'
RW	10	Suphanat Mueanta
AM	13	Ben Davis	(substituted off) 42'
LW	11	Anan Yodsangwal
CF	9	Patrik Gustavsson	(substituted off) 76'
Substitutions:
MF	25	Seksan Ratree	(substituted on) 42'
FW	14	Teerasak Poeiphimai	(substituted on) 76'
MF	18	Weerathep Pomphan	(substituted on) 76'
DF	21	Suphanan Bureerat	(substituted on) 88'
MF	22	Worachit Kanitsribampen	(substituted on) 88'
Manager:
(Japan) Masatada Ishii

Assistant referees:
Kang Dong-ho (South Korea)
Nguyễn Trung Việt (Vietnam)
Fourth official:
Yudi Nurcahya (Indonesia)

Overall
Statistics	East Timor	Thailand
Goals scored	0	10
Total shots	5	24
Shots on target	1	17
Ball possession	40%	59%
Corner kicks	1	6
Fouls committed	7	6
Offsides	0	1
Yellow cards	1	0
Red cards	0	0

=== Singapore vs Cambodia ===
11 December 2024
19:00 UTC+8

Singapore	2–1	Cambodia
Faris 9'; Shawal 16'	Report	Chanthea 59'

National Stadium, Singapore
Attendance: 12,391
Referee: Ahmed Faisal Al-Ali (Jordan)

Singapore	Cambodia

GK	1	Izwan Mahbud
RB	2	Irfan Najeeb
CB	21	Safuwan Baharudin (c)
CB	15	Lionel Tan
LB	22	Christopher van Huizen	(substituted off) 68'
DM	8	Shahdan Sulaiman	(substituted off) 55'
RM	9	Glenn Kweh	(substituted off) 82'
CM	6	Shah Shahiran
CM	7	Kyoga Nakamura	(substituted off) 90'
LM	10	Faris Ramli	(substituted off) 55'
CF	20	Shawal Anuar	(substituted off) 68'
Substitutions:
MF	14	Hariss Harun	(substituted on) 55'
MF	16	Hami Syahin	(substituted on) 55'
FW	13	Taufik Suparno	(substituted on) 68'
DF	3	Ryhan Stewart	(substituted on) 68'
DF	24	Naqiuddin Eunos	(substituted on) 82'
DF	11	Shakir Hamzah	(substituted on) 90'
Manager:
(Japan) Tsutomu Ogura

GK	21	Vireak Dara
RB	7	Lim Pisoth		(substituted off) 46'
CB	4	Kan Mo (c)		(substituted off) 74'
CB	15	Takaki Ose
LB	11	Nick Taylor
DM	8	Orn Chanpolin		(substituted off) 86'
RM	16	Yeu Muslim		(substituted off) 67'
CM	19	Kim Sokyuth		(substituted off) 53'
CM	6	Yudai Ogawa	(yellow card) 34'
LM	9	Sieng Chanthea
CF	20	Abdel Kader		(substituted off) 46'
Substitutions:
FW	14	Hav Soknet		(substituted on) 46'
FW	17	Sa Ty		(substituted on) 46'
MF	26	Min Ratanak		(substituted on) 53'
DF	13	Sareth Krya		(substituted on) 67'
MF	2	Hikaru Mizuno		(substituted on) 74'
FW	23	Sor Rotana		(substituted on) 86'
Manager:
(Japan) Koji Gyotoku

Assistant referees:
Ayman Faisal Hamzeh Obeidat (Jordan)
Ahmad Mansour Samara Muhsen (Jordan)
Fourth official:
Ngô Duy Lân (Vietnam)

Overall
Statistics	Singapore	Cambodia
Goals scored	2	1
Total shots	5	18
Shots on target	3	7
Ball possession	46%	53%
Corner kicks	0	4
Fouls committed	14	16
Offsides	1	1
Yellow cards	0	1
Red cards	0	0

=== Malaysia vs East Timor ===
11 December 2024
21:00 UTC+8

Malaysia	3–2	Timor-Leste
Syafiq 37'; Josué 70', 83'	Report	Xavier 45+1'; João Pedro 45+3'

Bukit Jalil National Stadium, Kuala Lumpur
Attendance: 7,420
Referee: Omar Al-Yaqoubi (Oman)

Malaysia	East Timor

GK	1	Kalamullah Al-Hafiz
RB	2	Declan Lambert
CB	6	Dominic Tan (c)
CB	18	Harith Haiqal
LB	4	Daniel Ting
CM	11	Najmuddin Akmal		(substituted off) 61'
CM	21	Danial Amier
CM	20	Syafiq Ahmad		(substituted off) 46'
AM	16	Ezequiel Agüero		(substituted off) 76'
CF	9	Darren Lok		(substituted off) 32'
CF	17	Paulo Josué
Substitutions:
FW	22	Fergus Tierney		(substituted on) 32'	(substituted off) 46'
MF	10	Endrick		(substituted on) 46'
FW	13	Fazrul Amir		(substituted on) 46'
FW	7	Haqimi Azim	(yellow card) 90+2'	(substituted on) 61'
MF	8	Stuart Wilkin		(substituted on) 76'
Manager:
(Spain) Pau Martí

GK	1	Georgino Mendonça		(substituted off) 22'
RB	22	Nelson Viegas		(substituted off) 90+3'
CB	5	João Panji
CB	4	Francisco da Costa
LB	16	Freteliano		(substituted off) 82'
CM	11	Zenivio		(substituted off) 90+3'
CM	15	Santiago da Costa	(yellow card) 64'
CM	9	Olagar Xavier		(substituted off) 82'
AM	8	Claudio Osorio
CF	10	João Pedro (c)
CF	17	Mário Quintão
Substitutions:
GK	20	Junildo Pereira		(substituted on) 22'
FW	3	Kenny Ximenes		(substituted on) 82'
FW	26	Luís Figo		(substituted on) 82'
FW	7	Elias Mesquita		(substituted on) 82'
DF	25	Sandro Quintão		(substituted on) 90+3'
Manager:
(Chile) Simón Elissetche

Assistant referees:
Abu Bakar Al-Amri (Oman)
Nurhadi Sulchan (Indonesia)
Fourth official:
Ryan Saputra (Indonesia)

Overall
Statistics	Malaysia	East Timor
Goals scored	3	2
Total shots	27	7
Shots on target	9	2
Ball possession	72%	27%
Corner kicks	6	2
Fouls committed	6	10
Offsides	1	0
Yellow cards	1	1
Red cards	0	0

=== East Timor vs Singapore ===
14 December 2024
17:30 UTC+7

Timor-Leste	0–3	Singapore
	Report	Nakamura 76' (pen.); Shawal 83', 90'

Hàng Đẫy Stadium, Hanoi (Vietnam)
Attendance: 1,000
Referee: Ko Hyung-jin (South Korea)

East Timor	Singapore

GK	20	Junildo Pereira
RB	22	Nelson Viegas	(substituted off) 79'
CB	5	João Panji
CB	4	Francisco da Costa	(substituted off) 90+4'
LB	16	Freteliano	(substituted off) 90+2'
CM	11	Zenivio	(substituted off) 90+2'
CM	15	Santiago da Costa
CM	9	Olagar Xavier	(substituted off) 90+4'
AM	8	Claudio Osorio
CF	10	João Pedro (c)
CF	17	Mário Quintão
Substitutions:
FW	7	Elias Mesquita	(substituted on) 79'
FW	26	Luís Figo	(substituted on) 90+2'
DF	18	Filomeno Junior	(substituted on) 90+2'
DF	2	Almerito	(substituted on) 90+4'
DF	23	Anizo Correia	(substituted on) 90+4'
Manager:
(Chile) Simón Elissetche

GK	1	Izwan Mahbud
CB	3	Ryhan Stewart
CB	15	Lionel Tan		(substituted off) 46'
CB	5	Amirul Adli
RM	4	Nazrul Nazari		(substituted off) 46'
CM	6	Shah Shahiran (c)
CM	7	Kyoga Nakamura
CM	16	Hami Syahin	(yellow card) 78'
LM	11	Shakir Hamzah		(substituted off) 72'
SS	24	Naqiuddin Eunos		(substituted off) 62'
CF	23	Abdul Rasaq Akeem		(substituted off) 82'
Substitutions:
FW	25	Farhan Zulkifli		(substituted on) 46'
DF	21	Safuwan Baharudin		(substituted on) 46'
FW	20	Shawal Anuar		(substituted on) 62'
FW	9	Glenn Kweh		(substituted on) 72'
FW	17	Jordan Emaviwe	(yellow card) 90+4'	(substituted on) 82'
Manager:
(Japan) Tsutomu Ogura

Assistant referees:
Kang Dong-ho (South Korea)
Nguyễn Trung Hậu (Vietnam)
Fourth official:
Lê Vũ Linh (Vietnam)

Overall
Statistics	East Timor	Singapore
Goals scored	0	3
Total shots	9	17
Shots on target	1	6
Ball possession	35%	64%
Corner kicks	0	9
Fouls committed	2	11
Offsides	1	2
Yellow cards	0	2
Red cards	0	0

=== Thailand vs Malaysia ===
14 December 2024
20:00 UTC+7

Thailand	1–0	Malaysia
Gustavsson 57'	Report

Rajamangala Stadium, Bangkok
Attendance: 25,619
Referee: Rustam Lutfullin (Uzbekistan)

Thailand	Malaysia

GK	1	Patiwat Khammai
RB	12	Nicholas Mickelson	(yellow card) 36'	(substituted off) 70'
CB	5	Chalermsak Aukkee	(yellow card) 47'	(substituted off) 65'
CB	4	Jonathan Khemdee	(yellow card) 90+7'
LB	24	Apisit Sorada		(substituted off) 46'
DM	18	Weerathep Pomphan
CM	8	Peeradol Chamrasamee (c)
CM	16	Akarapong Pumwisat	(yellow card) 80'	(substituted off) 86'
RF	10	Suphanat Mueanta
CF	9	Patrik Gustavsson		(substituted off) 57'
LF	25	Seksan Ratree		(substituted off) 90+4'
Substitutions:
DF	6	Thitathorn Aksornsri		(substituted on) 46'
FW	14	Teerasak Poeiphimai		(substituted on) 65'
DF	3	Pansa Hemviboon		(substituted on) 65'
DF	21	Suphanan Bureerat		(substituted on) 70'
MF	19	William Weidersjö		(substituted on) 86'
DF	2	James Beresford		(substituted on) 90+4'
Manager:
(Japan) Masatada Ishii

GK	23	Haziq Nadzli
RB	5	Jimmy Raymond		(substituted off) 85'
CB	3	Khuzaimi Piee	(yellow card) 42'
CB	18	Harith Haiqal	(yellow card) 40'	(substituted off) 85'
LB	25	Adib Ra'op		(substituted off) 85'
DM	14	Syamer Kutty Abba (c)	(yellow card) 52'
RM	2	Declan Lambert
CM	16	Ezequiel Agüero		(substituted off) 89'
CM	10	Endrick
LM	13	Fazrul Amir		(substituted off) 74'
CF	7	Haqimi Azim		(substituted off) 74'
Substitutions:
FW	17	Paulo Josué		(substituted on) 74'
FW	22	Fergus Tierney		(substituted on) 74'
FW	19	G. Pavithran		(substituted on) 85'
FW	11	Najmuddin Akmal		(substituted on) 85'
MF	21	Danial Amier		(substituted on) 85'
FW	12	Daryl Sham		(substituted on) 89'
Manager:
(Spain) Pau Martí

Assistant referees:
Sanjar Shayusupov (Uzbekistan)
Alisher Usmonov (Uzbekistan)
Fourth official:
Thoriq Alkatiri (Indonesia)

Overall
Statistics	Thailand	Malaysia
Goals scored	1	0
Total shots	15	6
Shots on target	3	2
Ball possession	50%	49%
Corner kicks	2	6
Fouls committed	12	17
Offsides	1	0
Yellow cards	4	3
Red cards	0	0

=== Cambodia vs East Timor ===
17 December 2024
17:45 UTC+7

Cambodia	2–1	Timor-Leste
Rotana 42'; Soknet 79'	Report	João Pedro 22'

Olympic Stadium, Phnom Penh
Attendance: 17,109
Referee: Firdaus Norsafarov (Uzbekistan)

Cambodia	East Timor

GK	22	Reth Lyheng
RB	13	Sareth Krya (c)
CB	2	Hikaru Mizuno
CB	8	Orn Chanpolin
LB	11	Nick Taylor
CM	15	Takaki Ose	(yellow card) 78'
CM	6	Yudai Ogawa	(yellow card) 47'
RW	14	Hav Soknet		(substituted off) 80'
AM	10	Andrés Nieto
LW	9	Sieng Chanthea		(substituted off) 64'
CF	23	Sor Rotana		(substituted off) 90+4'
Substitutions:
DF	18	Seut Baraing		(substituted on) 64'
FW	20	Abdel Kader		(substituted on) 80'
FW	17	Sa Ty		(substituted on) 90+4'
Manager:
(Japan) Koji Gyotoku

GK	20	Junildo Pereira	(yellow card) 90+6'
RB	5	João Panji		(substituted off) 70'
CB	18	Filomeno Junior
CB	16	Freteliano		(substituted off) 90+3'
LB	4	Francisco da Costa
CM	11	Zenivio
CM	15	Santiago da Costa
CM	9	Olagar Xavier		(substituted off) 70'
AM	8	Claudio Osorio		(substituted off) 80'
CF	10	João Pedro (c)	(yellow card) 78'	(substituted off) 90+3'
CF	17	Mário Quintão
Substitutions:
FW	26	Luís Figo		(substituted on) 70'
DF	23	Anizo Correia		(substituted on) 70'
MF	14	Kornelis Nahak		(substituted on) 80'
FW	3	Kenny Ximenes		(substituted on) 90+3'
FW	7	Elias Mesquita		(substituted on) 90+3'
Manager:
(Chile) Simón Elissetche

Assistant referees:
Bakhtiyorkhuja Shavkatov (Uzbekistan)
Supawan Hinthong (Thailand)
Fourth official:
Pansa Chaisanit (Thailand)

Overall
Statistics	Cambodia	East Timor
Goals scored	2	1
Total shots	16	5
Shots on target	8	1
Ball possession	68%	31%
Corner kicks	15	1
Fouls committed	10	12
Offsides	1	5
Yellow cards	2	2
Red cards	0	0

=== Singapore vs Thailand ===
17 December 2024
20:30 UTC+8

Singapore	2–4	Thailand
Shawal 10'; Faris 34'	Report	Gustavsson 45+3'; Suphanat 52'; Peeradol 90+3'; Teerasak 90+15'

National Stadium, Singapore
Attendance: 22,611
Referee: Ismaeel Habib Ali (Bahrain)

Singapore	Thailand

GK	1	Izwan Mahbud
CB	3	Ryhan Stewart		(substituted off) 64'
CB	15	Lionel Tan
CB	5	Amirul Adli
RM	2	Irfan Najeeb	(yellow card) 90+2'
CM	6	Shah Shahiran (c)
CM	7	Kyoga Nakamura	(yellow card) 50'
CM	16	Hami Syahin		(substituted off) 86'
LM	10	Faris Ramli		(substituted off) 74'
CF	9	Glenn Kweh		(substituted off) 73'
CF	20	Shawal Anuar		(substituted off) 66'
Substitutions:
DF	22	Christopher van Huizen		(substituted on) 64'
FW	13	Taufik Suparno	(yellow card) 85'	(substituted on) 66'
FW	25	Farhan Zulkifli		(substituted on) 73'
FW	23	Abdul Rasaq Akeem		(substituted on) 74'
DF	11	Shakir Hamzah		(substituted on) 86'
Manager:
(Japan) Tsutomu Ogura

GK	1	Patiwat Khammai
RB	21	Suphanan Bureerat	(yellow card) 42'	(substituted off) 66'
CB	3	Pansa Hemviboon
CB	15	Saringkan Promsupa		(substituted off) 90+9'
LB	6	Thitathorn Aksornsri
DM	18	Weerathep Pomphan	(yellow card) 81'
CM	19	William Weidersjö		(substituted off) 88'
CM	8	Peeradol Chamrasamee (c)
RF	10	Suphanat Mueanta
CF	9	Patrik Gustavsson		(substituted off) 66'
LF	11	Anan Yodsangwal		(substituted off) 66'
Substitutions:
MF	25	Seksan Ratree		(substituted on) 66'
DF	12	Nicholas Mickelson		(substituted on) 66'
FW	14	Teerasak Poeiphimai		(substituted on) 66'
MF	22	Worachit Kanitsribampen		(substituted on) 88'
DF	4	Jonathan Khemdee		(substituted on) 90+9'
Manager:
(Japan) Masatada Ishii

Assistant referees:
Faisal Alawi Sayed (Bahrain)
Salah Abdulaziz Janahi (Bahrain)
Fourth official:
Hoàng Ngọc Hà (Vietnam)

Overall
Statistics	Singapore	Thailand
Goals scored	2	4
Total shots	12	21
Shots on target	3	8
Ball possession	43%	56%
Corner kicks	3	6
Fouls committed	12	11
Offsides	1	3
Yellow cards	3	2
Red cards	0	0

=== Thailand vs Cambodia ===
20 December 2024
20:00 UTC+7

Thailand	3–2	Cambodia
Akarapong 33', 78'; Chalermsak 84'	Report	Nieto 32'; Abdel Kader 90+6'

Rajamangala Stadium, Bangkok
Attendance: 15,261
Referee: Tam Ping Wun (Hong Kong)

Thailand	Cambodia

GK	20	Kampol Pathomakkakul
RB	2	James Beresford	(substituted off) 46'
CB	5	Chalermsak Aukkee
CB	4	Jonathan Khemdee
LB	24	Apisit Sorada	(substituted off) 46'
CM	19	William Weidersjö (c)	(substituted off) 71'
CM	16	Akarapong Pumwisat
RW	12	Nicholas Mickelson
AM	22	Worachit Kanitsribampen
LW	11	Anan Yodsangwal	(substituted off) 46'
CF	14	Teerasak Poeiphimai	(substituted off) 89'
Substitutions:
FW	10	Suphanat Mueanta	(substituted on) 46'
MF	25	Seksan Ratree	(substituted on) 46'
DF	6	Thitathorn Aksornsri	(substituted on) 46'
MF	18	Weerathep Pomphan	(substituted on) 71'
FW	9	Patrik Gustavsson	(substituted on) 89'
Manager:
(Japan) Masatada Ishii

GK	22	Reth Lyheng
RB	13	Sareth Krya
CB	5	Soeuy Visal (c)	(yellow card) 83'
CB	15	Takaki Ose
LB	18	Seut Baraing
CM	2	Hikaru Mizuno
CM	8	Orn Chanpolin
RW	14	Hav Soknet		(substituted off) 55'
AM	10	Andrés Nieto		(substituted off) 70'
LW	11	Nick Taylor		(substituted off) 55'
CF	23	Sor Rotana		(substituted off) 55'
Substitutions:
FW	9	Sieng Chanthea		(substituted on) 55'
FW	20	Abdel Kader		(substituted on) 55'
FW	17	Sa Ty		(substituted on) 55'
MF	26	Min Ratanak		(substituted on) 70'
Manager:
(Japan) Koji Gyotoku

Assistant referees:
Wong Ping Chung (Hong Kong)
Bambang Syamsudar (Indonesia)
Fourth official:
Nguyễn Mạnh Hải (Vietnam)

Overall
Statistics	Thailand	Cambodia
Goals scored	3	2
Total shots	14	12
Shots on target	5	5
Ball possession	64%	35%
Corner kicks	10	2
Fouls committed	5	11
Offsides	7	0
Yellow cards	0	1
Red cards	0	0

=== Malaysia vs Singapore ===
20 December 2024
21:00 UTC+8

Malaysia	0–0	Singapore
	Report

Bukit Jalil National Stadium, Kuala Lumpur
Attendance: 31,127
Referee: Hiroyuki Kimura (Japan)

Malaysia	Singapore

GK	23	Haziq Nadzli
RB	5	Jimmy Raymond		(substituted off) 84'
CB	6	Dominic Tan		(substituted off) 58'
CB	18	Harith Haiqal
LB	4	Daniel Ting	(yellow card) 21'
DM	14	Syamer Kutty Abba (c)
RM	10	Endrick
CM	8	Stuart Wilkin		(substituted off) 90+2'
LM	16	Ezequiel Agüero		(substituted off) 83'
SS	2	Declan Lambert
CF	7	Haqimi Azim		(substituted off) 58'
Substitutions:
FW	17	Paulo Josué		(substituted on) 58'
FW	22	Fergus Tierney		(substituted on) 58'
FW	13	Fazrul Amir		(substituted on) 83'
DF	3	Khuzaimi Piee		(substituted on) 84'
FW	20	Syafiq Ahmad		(substituted on) 90+2'
Manager:
(Spain) Pau Martí

GK	1	Izwan Mahbud	(yellow card) 88'
RB	2	Irfan Najeeb
CB	21	Safuwan Baharudin (c)
CB	15	Lionel Tan	(yellow card) 82'
LB	5	Amirul Adli
DM	8	Shahdan Sulaiman		(substituted off) 58'
RM	4	Nazrul Nazari		(substituted off) 58'
CM	6	Shah Shahiran	(yellow card) 51'
CM	16	Hami Syahin		(substituted off) 62'
LM	10	Faris Ramli		(substituted off) 72'
CF	23	Abdul Rasaq Akeem		(substituted off) 46'
Substitutions:
FW	20	Shawal Anuar	(yellow card) 78'	(substituted on) 46'
FW	9	Glenn Kweh		(substituted on) 58'
MF	7	Kyoga Nakamura		(substituted on) 58'
MF	14	Hariss Harun		(substituted on) 62'
DF	3	Ryhan Stewart		(substituted on) 72'
Manager:
(Japan) Tsutomu Ogura

Assistant referees:
Khalaf Al-Shammari (Saudi Arabia)
Saad Al-Subaie (Saudi Arabia)
Fourth official:
Ngô Duy Lân (Vietnam)

Overall
Statistics	Malaysia	Singapore
Goals scored	0	0
Total shots	20	10
Shots on target	5	3
Ball possession	53%	46%
Corner kicks	9	6
Fouls committed	13	14
Offsides	1	0
Yellow cards	1	4
Red cards	0	0
