= Malaysia national football team results (2020–present) =

This article provides details of international football games played by the Malaysia national football team from 2020 to present.

== Results ==
Key
Win
Draw
Defeat

=== 2020 ===
2022 World Cup qualification and 2020 AFF Championship matches that was scheduled to be played in 2020 was postponed and rescheduled multiple times due to the COVID-19 pandemic in Asia. Finally, majority of the upcoming matches was decided to be postponed to 2021.

=== 2021 ===
28 May 2021 Friendly	Bahrain	2–0	Malaysia	Riffa, Bahrain
19:30 UTC+3	Abdul-Jabbar 41' (pen.); Marhoon 61'	Report		Stadium: Bahrain National Stadium; Referee: Turki Al-Khudhayr (Saudi Arabia)

3 June 2021 2022 World Cup qualification	United Arab Emirates	4–0	Malaysia	Dubai, United Arab Emirates
20:45 UTC+4	Mabkhout 18', 90+1'; Lima 83', 90+2'	Report		Stadium: Zabeel Stadium; Referee: Kim Dae-yong (South Korea)

11 June 2021 2022 World Cup qualification	Malaysia	1–2	Vietnam	Dubai, United Arab Emirates
20:45 UTC+4	Lucrécio 72' (pen.)	Report	Nguyễn Tiến Linh 27'; Quế Ngọc Hải 82' (pen.)	Stadium: Al Maktoum Stadium; Referee: Ryuji Sato (Japan)

15 June 2021 2022 World Cup qualification	Thailand	0–1	Malaysia	Dubai, United Arab Emirates
20:45 UTC+4		Report	Safawi 52' (pen.)	Stadium: Al Maktoum Stadium; Referee: Mohammed Al-Hoish (Saudi Arabia)

6 October 2021 Friendly	Jordan	4–0	Malaysia	Amman, Jordan
19:00 UTC+3	Olwan 34', 47', 49'; Al-Saify 42'	Report		Stadium: Amman International Stadium

9 October 2021 Friendly	Uzbekistan	5–1	Malaysia	Amman, Jordan
18:00 UTC+3	Khamdamov 17', 29'; Norchaev 33'; Yuldashev 68'; Amanov 87'	Report	Bakhtiar 45+1'	Stadium: Amman International Stadium

6 December 2021 2020 AFF Championship (GS)	Cambodia	1–3	Malaysia	Bishan, Singapore
17:30 UTC+8	Rosib 90' (pen.)	Report	Safawi 23' (pen.); Akhyar 61'; Kogileswaran 78'	Stadium: Bishan Stadium; Referee: Shukri Hussain Al-Alhunfush (Saudi Arabia)

9 December 2021 2020 AFF Championship (GS)	Malaysia	4–0	Laos	Bishan, Singapore
17:30 UTC+8	Safawi 7', 34', 80'; Shahrul 78'	Report		Stadium: Bishan Stadium; Referee: Ammar Ebrahim Mahfoodh (Bahrain)

12 December 2021 2020 AFF Championship (GS)	Vietnam	3–0	Malaysia	Bishan, Singapore
20:30	Nguyễn Quang Hải 32'; Nguyễn Công Phượng 36'; Nguyễn Hoàng Đức 89'	Report		Stadium: Bishan Stadium; Referee: Ahmed Faisal Al-Ali (Jordan)

19 December 2021 2020 AFF Championship (GS)	Malaysia	1–4	Indonesia	Kallang, Singapore
20:30	Kogileswaran 13'	Report	Irfan 36', 43'; Arhan 50'; Baggott 82'	Stadium: National Stadium; Referee: Ammar Ebrahim Mahfoodh (Bahrain)

=== 2022 ===
23 March 2022 2022 FAS Tri-Nations Series	Malaysia	2–0	Philippines	Kallang, Singapore
20:00 UTC+8	Akhyar 3', 24'	Report		Stadium: National Stadium

26 March 2022 2022 FAS Tri-Nations Series	Singapore	2–1	Malaysia	Kallang, Singapore
20:00 UTC+8	Ikhsan 30', 76'	Report	Krasniqi 57'	Stadium: Singapore National Stadium

28 March 2022 Unofficial friendly^{1}	Albirex Niigata	0–3	Malaysia	Jalan Besar, Singapore
20:00 UTC+8			Krasniqi 9'; Sumareh 45'; Faisal 65'	Stadium: Jalan Besar Stadium

27 May 2022 Friendly	Malaysia	4–0	Brunei	Kuala Lumpur, Malaysia
20:45 UTC+8	Syafiq 16'; Syamer 45'; Faisal 58'; Lucrécio 83' (pen.)	Report		Stadium: Bukit Jalil Stadium; Attendance: 13,281; Referee: Nazmi Nasaruddin (Malaysia)

1 June 2022 Friendly	Malaysia	2–0	Hong Kong	Kuala Lumpur, Malaysia
21:00 UTC+8	Safawi 31' (pen.); Safiq 90+1'	Report		Stadium: Bukit Jalil Stadium; Attendance: 19705; Referee: Suhaizi Shukri (Malaysia)

8 June 2022 2023 Asian Cup qualification	Turkmenistan	1–3	Malaysia	Kuala Lumpur, Malaysia
21:00 UTC+8	Annadurdyýew 37'	Report	Safawi 11'; Faisal 16'; Corbin-Ong 45+2'	Stadium: Bukit Jalil Stadium; Attendance: 21,591; Referee: Omar Al-Yaqoubi (Oman)

11 June 2022 2023 Asian Cup qualification	Malaysia	1–2	Bahrain	Kuala Lumpur, Malaysia
21:00 UTC+8	Sumareh 55'	Report	Haram 57'; Yusuf 81' (pen.)	Stadium: Bukit Jalil Stadium; Attendance: 63,925; Referee: Sadullo Gulmurodi (Tajikistan)

14 June 2022 2023 Asian Cup qualification	Malaysia	4–1	Bangladesh	Kuala Lumpur, Malaysia
21:00 UTC+8	Safawi 16' (pen.); Cools 38'; Syafiq 47'; Lok 73'	Report	Ibrahim 31'	Stadium: Bukit Jalil National Stadium; Attendance: 52,964; Referee: Zaid Thamer Mohammed (Iraq)

22 September 2022 2022 King's Cup	Thailand	1–1 (3–5 p)	Malaysia	Chiang Mai, Thailand
20:30 UTC+7	Pansa 90+5'	Report	Corbin-Ong 32'	Stadium: 700th Anniversary Stadium; Attendance: 16,219; Referee: Muhammaq Taqi (Singapore)
	Penalties
	Pathompol (penalty scored); Suphanat (penalty scored); Kritsada (penalty scored); Supachok (penalty missed)		(penalty scored) Cools; (penalty scored) Syafiq; (penalty scored) Davies; (penalty scored) Lambert; (penalty scored) Corbin-Ong

25 September 2022 2022 King's Cup Final	Tajikistan	0–0 (3–0 p)	Malaysia	Chiang Mai, Thailand
20:30 UTC+7		Report		Stadium: 700th Anniversary Stadium; Attendance: 488; Referee: Wiwat Jumpaoon (Thailand)
	Penalties
	Nazarov (penalty missed); Khanonov (penalty scored); Tursunov (penalty scored); Soirov (penalty scored)		(penalty missed) Cools; (penalty missed) Nazmi; (penalty missed) Safawi

2 December 2022 Unofficial friendly^{1}	Malaysia	3–1	Malaysia U23	Kelana Jaya, Selangor, Malaysia
18:00 UTC+8	Faisal (?); Rowley (?); Agüero (?)		Imran Naim (?)	Stadium: Wisma FAM

9 December 2022 Friendly	Malaysia	4–0	Cambodia	Kuala Lumpur, Malaysia
21:00 UTC+8	Faisal 11', 45+1'; Tuck 38'; Wilkin 86'	Report		Stadium: Bukit Jalil Stadium; Attendance: 8,332; Referee: Mongkolchai Pechsri (Thailand)

14 December 2022 Friendly	Malaysia	3–0	Maldives	Kuala Lumpur, Malaysia
21:00 UTC+8	Lok 24'; Faisal 64'; Tuck 88'	Report		Stadium: Kuala Lumpur Stadium; Attendance: 6,002; Referee: Sivakorn Pu-udom (Thailand)

21 December 2022 2022 AFF Championship (GS)	Myanmar	0–1	Malaysia	Yangon, Myanmar
16:30 UTC+6:30		Report	Faisal 52'	Stadium: Thuwunna Stadium; Attendance: 4,500; Referee: Ahmed Faisal Al Ali (Jordan)

24 December 2022 2022 AFF Championship (GS)	Malaysia	5–0	Laos	Kuala Lumpur, Malaysia
20:30 UTC+8	Agüero 29'; Faisal 65', 68'; Haqimi 77'; Wilkin 87'	Report		Stadium: Bukit Jalil Stadium; Attendance: 29,961; Referee: Majed Al Shamrani (Saudi Arabia)

27 December 2022 2022 AFF Championship (GS)	Vietnam	3–0	Malaysia	Hanoi, Vietnam
19:00 UTC+7	Nguyễn Tiến Linh 28'; Que Ngoc Hai 64' (pen.); Nguyễn Hoàng Đức 83'	Report		Stadium: Mỹ Đình National Stadium; Attendance: 17,545; Referee: Ryuji Sato (Japan)

=== 2023 ===
3 January 2023 2022 AFF Championship (GS)	Malaysia	4–1	Singapore	Kuala Lumpur, Malaysia
20:30 UTC+8	D. Lok 35'; Wilkin 50', 54'; Agüero 88'	Report	Faris 85'	Stadium: Bukit Jalil Stadium; Attendance: 65,147; Referee: Mohammed Al Hoish (Saudi Arabia)

7 January 2023 2022 AFF Championship (SF Leg 1)	Malaysia	1–0	Thailand	Kuala Lumpur, Malaysia
20:30 UTC+8	Faisal 11'	Report		Stadium: Bukit Jalil Stadium; Attendance: 62,989; Referee: Kim Dae-yong (South Korea)

10 January 2023 2022 AFF Championship (SF Leg 2)	Thailand	3–0 (3–1 agg.)	Malaysia	Pathum Thani, Thailand
19:30 UTC+7	Teerasil 19'; Bordin 55'; Adisak 71'	Report		Stadium: Thammasat Stadium; Attendance: 18,927; Referee: Adham Makhadmeh (Jordan)

23 March 2023 Friendly	Malaysia	1–0	Turkmenistan	Johor, Malaysia
20:30 UTC+8	Akhyar 28'	Report		Stadium: Sultan Ibrahim Stadium; Attendance: 5,104; Referee: Ahmad A'Qashah (Singapore)

28 March 2023 Friendly	Malaysia	2–0	Hong Kong	Johor, Malaysia
22:00 UTC+8	Akhyar 18'; Faisal 40'	Report		Stadium: Sultan Ibrahim Stadium; Attendance: 4,593; Referee: Mongkolchai Pechsri (Thailand)

14 June 2023 Friendly	Malaysia	4–1	Solomon Islands	Terengganu, Malaysia
21:00 UTC+8	Josué 40'; Arif 45+2' (pen.); Safawi 77'; Tuck 90+1'	Report (WFT); Report (SB.com)	Lea'i 11'	Stadium: Sultan Mizan Zainal Abidin Stadium; Attendance: 12,265; Referee: Ngô Duy Lân (Vietnam)

20 June 2023 Friendly	Malaysia	10–0	Papua New Guinea	Terengganu, Malaysia
21:00 UTC+8	Safawi 45+4' (pen.); Josué 52', 64', 70'; Arif 57', 60', 87', 89'; Faisal 59'; D. Ting 76'	Report (WFT); Report (BH.com)		Stadium: Sultan Mizan Zainal Abidin Stadium; Attendance: 9,592; Referee: Yudi Nurcahya (Indonesia)

6 September 2023 Friendly	Syria	2–2	Malaysia	Chengdu, China
17:00 UTC+8	Mardik 12'; Yassin 41'	Report (Scoop); Report; ESPN (UK)	Akhyar 51'; D. Lok 85'	Stadium: East-Town Football Park Stadium; Referee: Shen Yinhao (China)

9 September 2023 Friendly	China	1–1	Malaysia	Chengdu, China
19:35 UTC+8	L. Liangming 36'	Report (Xinhua); Report; ESPN (UK)	Faisal 11'	Stadium: Phoenix Hill Sports Park Football Stadium; Attendance: 26,138; Referee: Abdulhadi Al-Ruaile (Qatar)

13 October 2023 2023 Merdeka Tournament SF	Malaysia	4–2	India	Kuala Lumpur, Malaysia
21:00 UTC+8	Cools 7'; Arif 20' (pen.); Faisal 42'; Corbin-Ong 61'	Report (Olympics.com); Report; ESPN (UK)	Mahesh 13'; Chhteri 51'	Stadium: Bukit Jalil National Stadium; Attendance: 46,150; Referee: Mongkolchai Pechsri (Thailand)

17 October 2023 2023 Merdeka Tournament F	Malaysia	0–2	Tajikistan	Kuala Lumpur, Malaysia
21:00 UTC+8		Report (TheStar); Report; ESPN (UK)	Soirov 44'; Samiev 88'	Stadium: Bukit Jalil National Stadium; Attendance: 36,558; Referee: Hoàng Ngọc Hà (Vietnam)

16 November 2023 2026 WCQ / 2027 ACQ	Malaysia	4–3	Kyrgyzstan	Kuala Lumpur, Malaysia
21:00 UTC+8	Cools 7', 77'; Brauzman 72' (o.g.); Faisal 90+3'	Report	Zhyrgalbek uulu 42'; Batyrkanov 44'; Merk 57'	Stadium: Bukit Jalil National Stadium; Attendance: 17,142; Referee: Ammar Mahfoodh (Bahrain)

21 November 2023 2026 WCQ / 2027 ACQ	Chinese Taipei	0–1	Malaysia	Taipei, Taiwan
19:00 UTC+8		Report	D. Lok 72'	Stadium: Taipei Municipal Stadium; Attendance: 9,521; Referee: Majed Al-Shamrani (Saudi Arabia)

=== 2024 ===
8 January 2024 Friendly^{1}	Syria	2–2	Malaysia	Doha, Qatar
20:30 UTC+3	Sabbag 70'; Hesar 74'	Report	Arif 39'; Josué 78'	Stadium: Grand Hamad Stadium

15 January 2024 2023 AFC Asian Cup GS	Malaysia	0–4	Jordan	Al Wakrah, Qatar
1:30 UTC+8		Report	Al-Mardi 12', 32'; Al-Taamari 18' (pen.), 85'	Stadium: Al Janoub Stadium; Attendance: 20,410; Referee: Mohammed Abdulla Hassan Mohamed (United Arab Emirates)

20 January 2024 2023 AFC Asian Cup GS	Bahrain	1–0	Malaysia	Al Rayyan, Qatar
22:30 UTC+8	Madan 90+6'	Report		Stadium: Jassim Bin Hamad Stadium; Attendance: 10,386; Referee: Ahmed Al-Kaf (Oman)

25 January 2024 2023 AFC Asian Cup GS	South Korea	3–3	Malaysia	Al Wakrah, Qatar
19:30 UTC+8	Jeong Woo-yeong 21'; Lee Kang-in 83'; Son Heung-min 90+4' (pen.)	Report	Faisal 51'; Arif 62' (pen.); Morales 90+15'	Stadium: Al Janoub Stadium; Attendance: 30,117; Referee: Khalid Al-Turais (Saudi Arabia)

15 March 2024 Unofficial friendly^{1}	Malaysia	5–1	Nepal	Shah Alam, Malaysia
22:00 UTC+8	Lok 31' (pen.), 36'; Wilkin 46'; Ting 48'; Mukhairi 135'		Tamang 68'	Stadium: Stadium UITM; Attendance: 0

21 March 2024 2026 WCQ / 2027 ACQ	Oman	2–0	Malaysia	Muscat, Oman
22:00 UTC+4	Al-Sabhi 58'; Al-Ghassani 88'	Report		Stadium: Sultan Qaboos Sports Complex; Attendance: 21,836; Referee: Fu Ming (CHN)

26 March 2024 2026 WCQ / 2027 ACQ	Malaysia	0–2	Oman	Kuala Lumpur, Malaysia
22:00 UTC+8		Report	Al-Malki 45+4' (pen.); Al-Ghafri 90+4'	Stadium: Bukit Jalil National Stadium; Attendance: 26,499; Referee: Ko Hyung-jin (KOR)

6 June 2024 2026 WCQ / 2027 ACQ	Kyrgyzstan	1–1	Malaysia	Bishkek, Kyrgyzstan
21:00 UTC+6	Alykulov 24'	Report	Abdurakhmanov 38' (o.g.)	Stadium: Dolen Omurzakov Stadium; Attendance: 14,135; Referee: Adham Makhadmeh (JOR)

11 June 2024 2026 WCQ / 2027 ACQ	Malaysia	3–1	Chinese Taipei	Kuala Lumpur, Malaysia
21:00 UTC+8	Safawi 53'; Paulo Josué 69'; Adib 90+6'	Report (FIFA); Report (AFC)	Yu Yao-hsing 20'	Stadium: Bukit Jalil National Stadium; Attendance: 14,731; Referee: Abdullah Jamali (KUW)

4 September 2024 2024 Merdeka Tournament Semifinal	Malaysia	2–1	Philippines	Kuala Lumpur, Malaysia
21:00 UTC+8	Syamer 43'; Safawi 73' (pen.)	Report	J. Tabinas 27'	Stadium: Bukit Jalil National Stadium; Attendance: 3,658; Referee: Yudi Nurcahya (INA)

8 September 2024 2024 Merdeka Tournament Final	Lebanon	0–1	Malaysia	Kuala Lumpur, Malaysia
21:00 UTC+8		Report	Morales 33'	Stadium: Bukit Jalil National Stadium; Attendance: 10,000; Referee: Thoriq Alkatiri (INA)

14 October 2024 Friendly	New Zealand	4–0	Malaysia	Auckland, New Zealand
19:00 UTC+12	Just 53'; Garbett 61'; Wood 72'; Rogerson 90'			Stadium: North Harbour Stadium; Attendance: 8,513; Referee: Jack Morgan (Australia)

14 November 2024 Friendly	Laos	1–3	Malaysia	Bangkok, Thailand
19:30 UTC+7	Souvanny 34'	Report	Harith 6'; Wilkin 64' (pen.); Agüero 83' (pen.)	Stadium: PAT Stadium; Referee: Songkran Bunmeekiart (Thailand)

18 November 2024 Friendly	India	1–1	Malaysia	Hyderabad, India
19:30 UTC+5:30	Bheke 39'	Report	Josué 19'	Stadium: G. M. C. Balayogi Athletic Stadium; Referee: Thoriq Alkatiri (Indonesia)

8 December 2024 ASEAN Championship GS	Cambodia	2–2	Malaysia	Phnom Penh, Cambodia
17:45 UTC+7	Coulibaly 52'; Ty 60'	Report	Wilkin 35'; Tierney 74'	Stadium: Phnom Penh Olympic Stadium; Attendance: 24,886; Referee: Kim Woo-sung (South Korea)

11 December 2024 ASEAN Championship GS	Malaysia	3–2	Timor-Leste	Kuala Lumpur, Malaysia
21:00 UTC+8	Syafiq 37'; Josué 70', 83'	Report	Xavier 45+1'; Pedro 45+3'	Stadium: Bukit Jalil National Stadium; Attendance: 7,420; Referee: Omar Al-Yaqoubi (Oman)

14 December 2024 ASEAN Championship GS	Thailand	1–0	Malaysia	Bangkok, Thailand
20:00 UTC+7	Gustavsson 57'	Report		Stadium: Rajamangala Stadium; Attendance: 25,619; Referee: Rustam Luftullin (Uzbekistan)

20 December 2024 ASEAN Championship GS	Malaysia	0–0	Singapore	Kuala Lumpur, Malaysia
21:00 UTC+8		Report		Stadium: Bukit Jalil National Stadium; Attendance: 31,127; Referee: Hiroyuki Kimura (Japan)

=== 2025 ===
25 March 2025 2027 Asian Cup Qualification - Third Round	Malaysia	0–3; Awarded (Note: On 26 September 2025, FIFA sanctioned the Football Association of Malaysia and seven players for using falsified eligibility documents. One player, Hector Hevel played in the match against Nepal. On 17 March 2026, the AFC overturned the game as a 3–0 victory for Nepal. The match originally ended in a 2–0 win for Malaysia.)	Nepal	Johor, Malaysia
22:00 UTC+8	Hevel 29'; Corbin-Ong 71'	Report Report (AFC)		Stadium: Sultan Ibrahim Stadium; Attendance: 7,895; Referee: Hiroki Kasahara (Japan)

29 May 2025 Friendly	Malaysia	0–3; Awarded (Note: Due to the Malaysian football naturalisation scandal, the FIFA Disciplinary Committee awarded the match as a 3–0 win to Cape Verde on 17 December 2025 as Malaysia fielded the ineligible players Gabriel Palmero and Hector Hevel. The match originally ended in a 1-1 draw for both teams. The Football Association of Malaysia (FAM) were also fined CHF 10,000.)	Cape Verde	Kuala Lumpur, Malaysia
21:00 UTC+8	Josué 79'	Report	S. Cabral 8'	Stadium: Kuala Lumpur Stadium; Attendance: 10,708; Referee: Mongkolchai Pechsri (Thailand)

3 June 2025 Closed-doors Friendly ^{1}	Malaysia	0–3	Cape Verde	Kuala Lumpur, Malaysia
21:00 UTC+8		Report	Livramento 35', 48'; H. Tavares 55'	Stadium: Bukit Jalil National Stadium; Attendance: 0

10 June 2025 2027 Asian Cup Qualification - Third Round	Malaysia	0–3; Awarded (Note: On 26 September 2025, FIFA sanctioned the Football Association of Malaysia and seven players for using falsified eligibility documents. All seven players all played in the match against Vietnam. On 17 March 2026, the AFC overturned the game as a 3–0 victory for Vietnam. The match originally ended in a 4–0 win for Malaysia.)	Vietnam	Kuala Lumpur, Malaysia
21:00 UTC+8	Figueiredo 49'; Holgado 58'; Corbin-Ong 67'; Cools 88'	Report Report (AFC)		Stadium: Bukit Jalil National Stadium; Attendance: 61,512; Referee: Hussein Abo Yehia (Lebanon)

4 September 2025 Friendly	Malaysia	0–3; Awarded (Note: Due to the Malaysian football naturalisation scandal, the FIFA Disciplinary Committee awarded the match as a 3–0 win to Singapore on 17 December 2025 as Malaysia fielded the ineligible players Gabriel Palmero, Facundo Garcés, Rodrigo Holgado, João Figueiredo and Jon Irazabal. The match originally ended in a 2–1 win for Malaysia. The Football Association of Malaysia (FAM) were also fined CHF 10,000.)	Singapore	Kuala Lumpur, Malaysia
21:00 UTC+8	Wilkin 27'; Figueiredo 54'	Report	Ilhan Fandi 72'	Stadium: Bukit Jalil National Stadium; Attendance: 22,329; Referee: Ngô Duy Lân (Vietnam)

8 September 2025 Friendly	Malaysia	0–3; Awarded (Note: Due to the Malaysian football naturalisation scandal, the FIFA Disciplinary Committee awarded the match as a 3–0 win to Palestine on 17 December 2025 as Malaysia fielded the ineligible players Rodrigo Holgado, João Figueiredo and Jon Irazabal. The match originally ended in a 1–0 win for Malaysia. The Football Association of Malaysia (FAM) were also fined CHF 10,000.)	Palestine	Johor, Malaysia
21:00 UTC+8	Figueiredo 3'	Report		Stadium: Sultan Ibrahim Stadium; Attendance: 7,084; Referee: Yudi Nurcahya (Indonesia)

9 October 2025 2027 Asian Cup Qualification - Third Round	Laos	0–3	Malaysia	Vientiane, Laos
19:00 UTC+7		Report Report (AFC)	Arif 53'; Cools 69'; Faisal 90+7'	Stadium: New Laos National Stadium; Attendance: 5,289; Referee: Wiwat Jumpao-on (Thailand)

14 October 2025 2027 Asian Cup Qualification - Third Round	Malaysia	5–1	Laos	Kuala Lumpur, Malaysia
21:00 UTC+8	Faisal 59'; Morales 65', 70'; Khammanh 79' (o.g.); Josué 82'	Report Report (AFC)	Chanthavixay 19'	Stadium: Bukit Jalil National Stadium; Attendance: 18,901; Referee: Ahmed Eisa Darwish (United Arab Emirates)

18 November 2025 2027 Asian Cup Qualification - Third Round	Nepal	0–1	Malaysia	Kuala Lumpur, Malaysia ^{2}
21:00 UTC+8		Report	Faisal 56'	Stadium: Bukit Jalil National Stadium; Attendance: 14,243; Referee: Kim Dae-yong (South Korea)

=== 2026 ===
31 March 2026 2027 Asian Cup Qualification - Third Round	Vietnam	3–1	Malaysia	Ninh Bình, Vietnam
19:00 UTC+7	Đỗ Duy Mạnh 6'; Nguyễn Xuân Son 51', 59'	Report; Report (AFC)	Endrick 77' (pen.)	Stadium: Thiên Trường Stadium; Attendance: 19,518; Referee: Chae Sang-hyeop (South Korea)

25 July 2026 2026 ASEAN Championship Group B	Myanmar	1–2	Malaysia	Yangon, Myanmar
16:30 UTC+6:30	Myat Kaung Khant 9'	Report	Josué 52', 57' (pen.)	Stadium: Thuwunna Stadium; Attendance: 10,500; Referee: Yusuke Ohashi (Japan)

28 July 2026 2026 ASEAN Championship Group B	Malaysia	4–0	Laos	Kuala Lumpur, Malaysia
21:00 UTC+8	Josué 45'; Endrick 57'; Viengxay 66' (o.g.); Kuzain 84'	Report		Stadium: Kuala Lumpur Stadium; Attendance: 10,044; Referee: Mohammed Sami Al-Ismail (Saudi Arabia)

1 August 2026 2026 ASEAN Championship Group B	Thailand	2–0	Malaysia	Bangkok, Thailand
20:00 UTC+7	Yotsakorn 38' (pen.); Teerasak 56'	Report		Stadium: Rajamangala Stadium; Attendance: 16,037; Referee: Kim Woo-sung (South Korea)

8 August 2026 2026 ASEAN Championship Group B	Malaysia	1–0	Philippines	Kuala Lumpur, Malaysia
21:00 UTC+8	Pavithran 16'	Report		Stadium: Kuala Lumpur Stadium; Attendance: 12,734; Referee: Alimardon Bainazarov (Kyrgyzstan)

16 August 2026 ASEAN Championship SF	Malaysia	0–2	Vietnam	Kuala Lumpur, Malaysia
21:00 UTC+8		Report	Nguyễn Xuân Son 45+5'; Faris Danish 86' (o.g.)	Stadium: Kuala Lumpur Stadium; Referee: Rustam Lutfullin (Uzbekistan)

19 August 2026 ASEAN Championship SF	Vietnam	2–0	Malaysia	Hanoi, Vietnam
20:00 UTC+7	Nguyễn Xuân Son 62', 89'	Report		Stadium: Mỹ Đình National Stadium; Attendance: 37,966; Referee: Yusuke Ohashi (Japan)

25 September 2026 FIFA ASEAN Cup Group A	Bangladesh	0–3	Malaysia	Jakarta, Indonesia
16:00 UTC+7		Report	Arif Aiman 18', 38'; Bérgson 53'	Stadium: Gelora Bung Karno Stadium; Referee: Resul Mämmedow (Turkmenistan)

28 September 2026 FIFA ASEAN Cup Group A	Indonesia	0–0	Malaysia	Jakarta, Indonesia
19:30 UTC+7		Report		Stadium: Gelora Bung Karno Stadium; Attendance: 56,894; Referee: Ko Hyung-jin (South Korea)

1 October 2026 FIFA ASEAN Cup Group A	Malaysia	6–0	Singapore	Bandung, Indonesia
19:30 UTC+7	Bérgson 8' (pen.), 62', 90+3'; Wilkin 26'; Josué 76'; Bashah 87'	Report		Stadium: Si Jalak Harupat Stadium; Referee: Kim Jong-hyeok (South Korea)

5 October 2026 FIFA ASEAN Cup 3rd Place	Malaysia	1–0	Vietnam	Jakarta, Indonesia
16:00 UTC+7	Tierney 62'	Report		Stadium: Gelora Bung Karno Stadium; Referee: Ko Hyung-jin (South Korea)

14 November Friendly	China	2–0	Malaysia	Guangzhou, China
20:00 UTC+8	Yudang 10'; Yuning 19'			Stadium: Tianhe Stadium; Referee: Ko Hyung-jin (South Korea)

17 November Friendly	Malaysia	2–1	Yemen	Zhaoqing, China
14:00 UTC+8	Chin 7', 57'		Al-Sheraji 78'	Stadium: Zhaoqing New District Sports Center Stadium; Referee: Zhang Lei (China)

Note

- ^{1} Non FIFA 'A' international match
- ^{2} The Asian Football Confederation (AFC) confirmed the venue change after Nepal's proposed stadium failed to meet its requirements. Nepal have confirmed that they will play at Bukit Jalil National Stadium as their home venue.
