= Jimmy Raymond =

Malaysian footballer

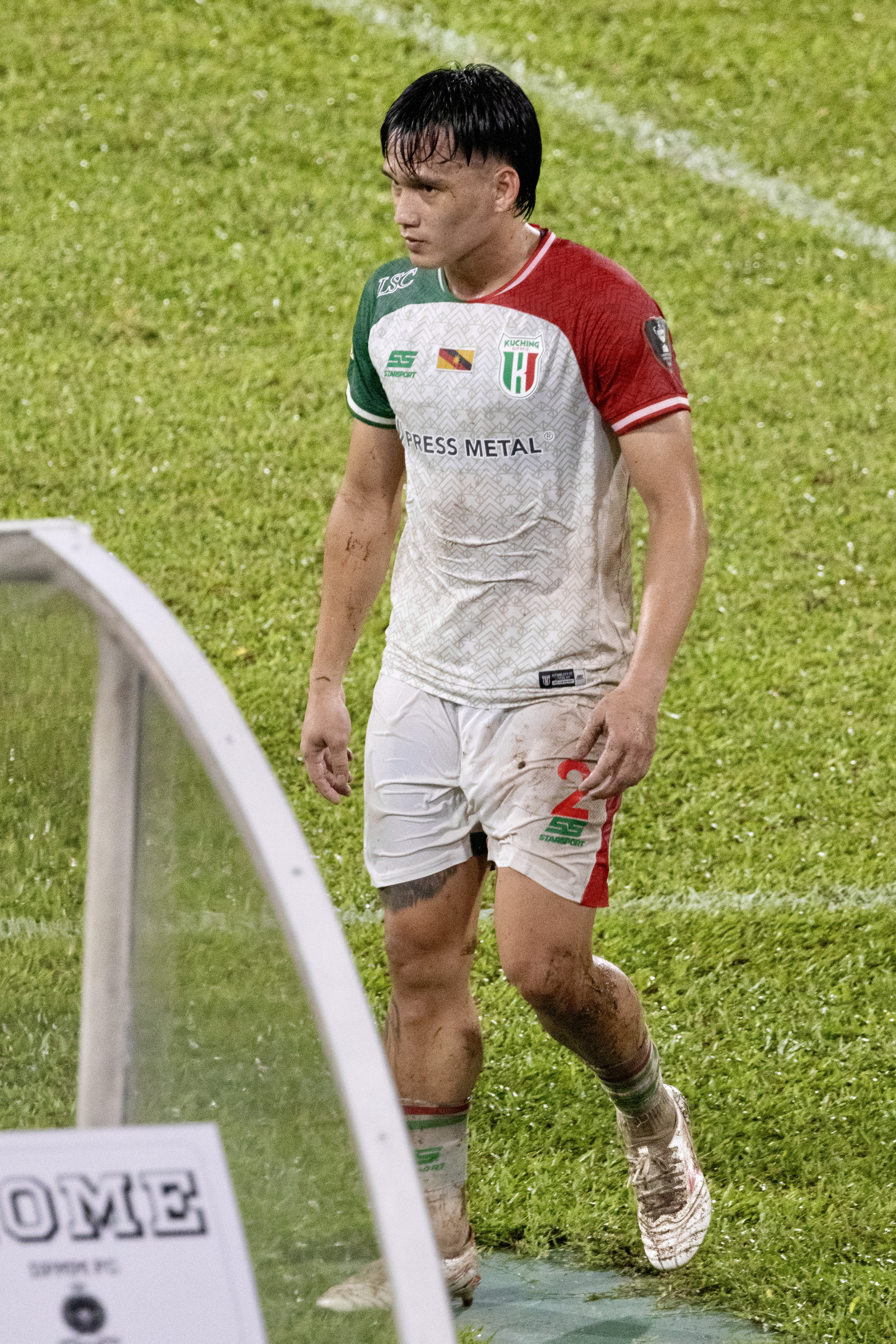
- Raymond in 2025

Personal information
- Full name: James Jacob Raymond
- Date of birth: 26 April 1996 (age 30)
- Place of birth: Bintulu, Malaysia
- Height: 1.64 m (5 ft 4 1/2 in)
- Position: Defender

Team information
- Current team: Kuching City
- Number: 2

Youth career
- –2017: Sarawak U21

Senior career*
Years	Team	Apps	(Gls)
2017–2018	Sarawak	14	(0)
2019–	Kuching City	50	(0)

International career^{‡}
2024–	Malaysia	3	(0)
- * Club domestic league appearances and goals as of 20:04, 21 July 2018 (UTC) ‡ National team caps and goals as of 21 December 2024

James Jacob Raymond (born 26 April 1996), is a Malaysian professional footballer who plays as a defender for Kuching City and the Malaysia national team.

== International career ==
In November 2024, Jimmy was called up by Pau Martí to the Malaysia national team squad for the 2024 ASEAN Championship.

On 8 December 2024, Jimmy made his international debut in the group stage match against Cambodia at the Phnom Penh Olympic Stadium.

On 11 July 2026, Jimmy was called up by Malaysia interim manager Tan Cheng Hoe for the 25-man final squad list for the 2026 ASEAN Championship.

== Career statistics ==
=== Club ===
As of 6 November 2017

Club	Season	League			Cup		League Cup		Continental		Total	
Club	Season	Division	Apps	Goals	Apps	Goals	Apps	Goals	Apps	Goals	Apps	Goals
Sarawak	2017	Malaysia Super League	3	0	0	0	3	0	0	0	6	0
Sarawak	2018	Malaysia Premier League	11	0	0	0	0	0	–	–	11	0
Sarawak	Total		14	0	0	0	3	0	0	0	17	0
Kuching City	2019	Malaysia M3 League	0	0	0	0	3	0	0	0	0	0
Kuching City	2020	Malaysia Premier League	0	0	0	0	0	0	–	–	0	0
Kuching City	2021	Malaysia Premier League	0	0	0	0	0	0	–	–	0	0
Kuching City	2022	Malaysia Premier League	0	0	0	0	0	0	–	–	0	0
Kuching City	2023	Malaysia Super League	0	0	0	0	0	0	–	–	0	0
Kuching City	2024–25	Malaysia Super League	0	0	0	0	0	0	–	–	0	0
Kuching City	2025–26	Malaysia Super League	0	0	0	0	0	0	–	–	0	0
Kuching City	Total		0	0	0	0	0	0	0	0	0	0
Career total			0	0	0	0	0	0	0	0	0	0

=== International ===
As of 21 December 2024

Appearances and goals by national team and year
National team	Year	Apps	Goals
Malaysia	2024	3	0
Total		3	0

== Honours ==
=== Individual ===
- Malaysia Super League Team of the Season: 2024–25
