= National Olympic Stadium =

National Olympic Stadium may refer to:

- Olympic Stadium (Phnom Penh)
- Dinamo Stadium (Minsk)
- National Olympic Stadium (Tokyo)
