= Pau Martí =

Pau Martí may refer to:

- Pau Martí (football manager)
- Pau Martí (cyclist)
