= National Olympic =

National Olympic may refer to

- National Olympic Committee, the national constituent of the worldwide Olympic movement.
- Phnom Penh Olympic Stadium, a stadium in Cambodia.
- Olympic National Park, a national park in the United States.
