= Sor Rotana =

Cambodian footballer

Personal information
- Full name: Sor Rotana
- Date of birth: 9 October 2002 (age 24)
- Place of birth: Phnom Penh, Cambodia
- Height: 1.84 m (6 ft 0 in)
- Positions: Winger; center back

Team information
- Current team: Visakha
- Number: 5

Youth career
- 2018–2020: Visakha

Senior career*
Years	Team	Apps	(Gls)
2020–2022	Prey Veng		
2023–	Visakha	71	(14)

International career^{‡}
2019	Cambodia U19	2	(0)
2021–2023	Cambodia U23	8	(5)
2021–	Cambodia	20	(2)
Medal record
Men's football
Representing Cambodia
FIFA ASEAN Challenge Cup
Runner-up	2026 Hong Kong
- * Club domestic league appearances and goals as of 20:12, 9 November 2026 (UTC) ‡ National team caps and goals as of 20:12, 5 October 2026 (UTC)

Sor Rotana (born 9 October 2002) is a Cambodian professional footballer who plays as a centre back for Cambodian Premier League club Visakha and the Cambodia national football team.

== Career statistics ==
=== International ===
As of matches played 4 June 2021.

National team	Year	Apps	Goals
Cambodia	2021	4	0
Cambodia	2023	3	0
Cambodia	2024	6	1
Cambodia	2025	1	0
Cambodia	2026	1	1
Total		14	2

=== International goals ===
No.	Date	Venue	Opponent	Score	Result	Competition
1.	17 December 2024	Phnom Penh Olympic Stadium, Phnom Penh, Cambodia	Timor-Leste	1–1	2–1	2024 ASEAN Championship
2.	4 June 2026	Phnom Penh Olympic Stadium, Phnom Penh, Cambodia	Bhutan	1–0	4–0	Friendly
