= Abdel Kader Coulibaly =

Cambodian footballer (born 1994)

Personal information
- Date of birth: 18 June 1993 (age 33)
- Place of birth: M'Bahiakro, Ivory Coast
- Height: 1.79 m (5 ft 10 in)
- Position: Forward

Team information
- Current team: Melaka
- Number: 13

Senior career*
Years	Team	Apps	(Gls)
2018–2019	Asia Euro United		
2019–2020	Ministry of Interior FA		
2022–2025	ISI Dangkor Senchey	35	(11)
2025–2026	Angkor Tiger	25	(5)
2026–	Melaka	2	(1)

International career^{‡}
2024–	Cambodia	9	(3)
- * Club domestic league appearances and goals as of 19 November 2026 ‡ National team caps and goals as of 19 August 2026

Abdel Kader Coulibaly (Khmer: ឃូលីបាលី អាបឌែល; born 18 June 1993) is a professional footballer who plays as a forward for Malaysia Super League club Melaka. Born in Ivory Coast, he represents Cambodia internationally.

== Club career ==
In 2018, Coulibaly signed for Cambodian side Asia Euro United, before signing for Cambodian side Ministry of Interior FA in 2019. Ahead of the 2022 season, he signed for Cambodian side ISI Dangkor Senchey. A Cambodian newspaper wrote in 2025 that he "earned a name for himself in Cambodian football" while playing for the club. Subsequently, he signed for Cambodian side Angkor Tiger in 2025.

== International career ==
Coulibaly is a Cambodia international and played for the Cambodia national football team at the 2024 ASEAN Championship. On 8 December 2024, he debuted and scored his first goal for the team during a 2–2 home draw with the Malaysia national football team in the 2024 ASEAN Championship.

== International goals ==
No.	Date	Venue	Opponent	Score	Result	Competition
1.	8 December 2024	Olympic Stadium, Phnom Penh, Cambodia	Malaysia	1–1	2–2	2024 ASEAN Championship
2.	20 December 2024	Rajamangala Stadium, Bangkok, Thailand	Thailand	2–3	2–3	2024 ASEAN Championship
3.	4 June 2026	Olympic Stadium, Phnom Penh, Cambodia	Bhutan	2–0	4–0	Friendly

== Honours ==
ASEAN All-Stars

- Maybank Challenge Cup: 2025

== Personal life ==
Coulibaly was born on 18 June 1993 in Ivory Coast and is a native of the east of the country.
