= James Beresford (footballer, born 2002) =

Thai footballer (born 2002)

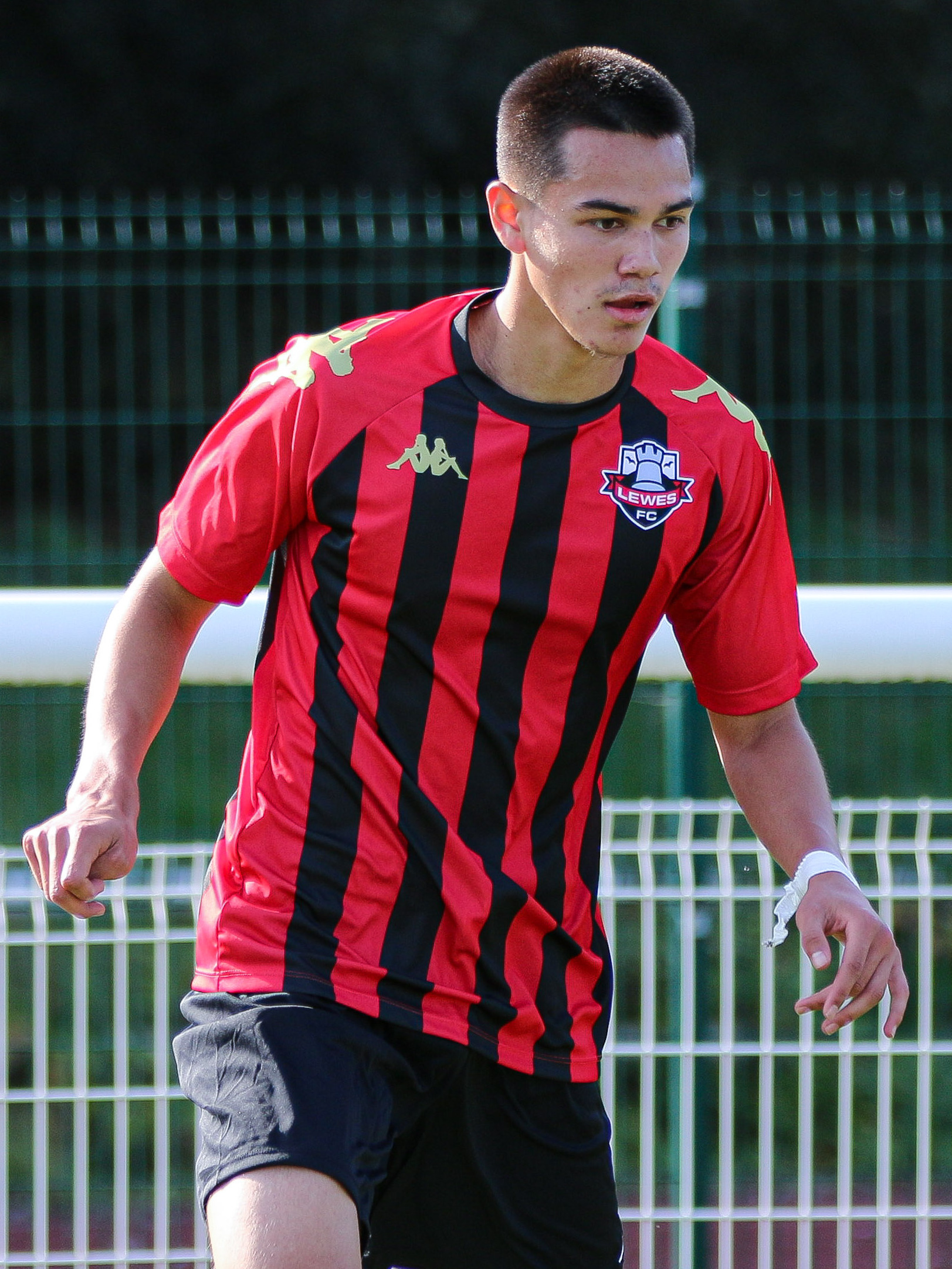
- Beresford playing for Lewes in 2020

Personal information
- Date of birth: 17 April 2002 (age 24)
- Place of birth: Worthing, England
- Height: 1.83 m (6 ft 0 in)
- Position: Right-back

Team information
- Current team: Bangkok United
- Number: 6

Youth career
- Brighton & Hove Albion
- –2019: Worthing

Senior career*
Years	Team	Apps	(Gls)
2019–2020	Lancing	8	(0)
2020–2021	Lewes	16	(0)
2021	Eastbourne Borough	11	(0)
2021–2023	Worthing	45	(2)
2023–2026	Uthai Thani	86	(3)
2026–	Bangkok United	0	(0)

International career^{‡}
2023–	Thailand	4	(0)
Medal record
Thailand
ASEAN Championship
Runner-up	ASEAN 2024	Team
- * Club domestic league appearances and goals as of 08:29, 29 May 2026 (UTC) ‡ National team caps and goals as of 13:03, 20 May 2026 (UTC)

James Beresford (Thai: เจมส์ เบอร์เรสฟอร์ด; born 17 April 2002) is a professional footballer who plays as a right-back for Thai League 1 club Bangkok United. Born in England, he plays for the Thailand national team.

== Club career ==
=== Youth career ===
Beresford came through the Brighton & Hove Albion academy before joining his hometown club, Worthing.

In 2019, Beresford started his senior football career with Isthmian League club, Lancing. During his time with Lancing, he had a six-week trial with Championship side Reading.

In 2020, Beresford moved to another Isthmian League club, Lewes.

In July 2021, Beresford moved to sixth tier National League South club, Eastbourne Borough.

Beresford returned to his boyhood club, Worthing in December 2021. He helped his club to win the 2021–22 Isthmian League.

=== Thailand ===
In June 2023, Beresford agreed a move to the newly-promoted Thai League 1 side Uthai Thani and head to Thailand. On 12 August 2023, he made his professional league debut, starting in a 4–1 loss to Bangkok United.

In May 2026, Beresford joined Bangkok United on a free transfer.

== International career ==
In August 2023, it was stated that Beresford was in contention for a call-up to the Thailand U23 team ahead of the 2023 AFF U-23 Championship and the 2024 U23 Asian Cup qualifiers.

In October 2023, he was called up to the Thailand senior squad for the first team. On 17 October 2023, Beresford made his senior international debut coming on as a substitute in a 1–1 draw with Estonia. In January 2024, he was called up to train with the Thailand U23 side.

Beresford was selected in the Thailand squad for the 2024 ASEAN Championship.

== Personal life ==
Beresford is of Thai descent.

== Career statistics ==
As of match played 4 July 2025.

Appearances and goals by national team and year
National team	Year	Apps	Goals
Thailand	2023	1	0
Thailand	2024	3	0
Total		4	0

== Honours ==
Worthing

- Isthmian league winner: 2021–22
- Sussex Senior Challenge Cup winner: 2022–23

Individual

- Thai League Best XI: 2023–24
