= Kenny Ximenes =

East Timorese footballer

Personal information
- Full name: Kenny Mercelino Ximenes
- Date of birth: 4 April 2005 (age 21)
- Place of birth: Dili, East Timor
- Position: Forward

Team information
- Current team: Dungannon Swifts
- Number: 15

Youth career
- 2013–2023: Dungannon Swifts

Senior career*
Years	Team	Apps	(Gls)
2023–	Dungannon Swifts	1	(0)
2024–2025	→ Annagh United (loan)	18	(3)
2025	→ Dollingstown (loan)	12	(1)

International career^{‡}
2024–	Timor-Leste	3	(0)
- * Club domestic league appearances and goals as of 16 November 2024 ‡ National team caps and goals as of 17 December 2024

Kenny Mercelino Ximenes (born 4 April 2005) is a Timorese footballer who plays for NIFL Premiership club Dungannon Swifts and the Timor-Leste national team.

== Club career ==
=== Dungannon Swifts ===
Ximenes was born in Timor-Leste and moved to Dungannon, Northern Ireland at age eight. He began his career with local club Dungannon Swifts. He went on to have trials at Rangers, Birmingham City, and Derby County. Ximenes played for Dungannon's reserve squad in the Development League and by 2022 was expected to make the jump to the first team soon. Also in 2022, he led Dungannon U18 to its first-ever Harry Cavan Cup title with a win over Glenavon. Ximenes scored in the match and was named MVP following the victory.

In 2023, Ximenes signed his first professional contract with Dungannon Swifts. He was also a member of the Integrated College Dungannon football club that went on to win Danske Bank Schools' Cup that year while attending the school as part of the NIFL Scholarship Programme. Ximenes went on to make his senior debut for the club on 29 April 2023 in a 2–1 victory over Newry City.

==== Annagh United (loan) ====
In June 2024, Dungannon announced that Ximenes would spend the 2024–25 season on loan at NIFL Championship side Annagh United. He scored the game-winning goal against Bangor on 17 August 2024 for his first goal with the club.

== International career ==
In 2019, Ximenes was part of the Northern Ireland under-16 squad setup, including for the annual Victory Shield.

In December 2024, Ximenes received his first call-up to the Timor-Leste national team replacing the injured Mouzinho. He made his debut on 8 December against Thailand at the 2024 ASEAN Championship.

== Career statistics ==
=== International ===
As of match played 17 December 2024

Timor-Leste national team
Year	Apps	Goals
2024	3	0
Total	3	0
