= Sa Ty =

Cambodian footballer

Personal information
- Full name: Sa Ty
- Date of birth: 4 April 2002 (age 24)
- Place of birth: Kampong Chhnang, Cambodia
- Height: 1.70 m (5 ft 7 in)
- Positions: Winger; forward

Team information
- Current team: Phnom Penh Crown
- Number: 9

Youth career
- 2019–2020: Bati Academy

Senior career*
Years	Team	Apps	(Gls)
2020–2021	Electricite du Cambodge		(10)
2022–2025	Visakha	61	(10)
2025–	Phnom Penh Crown	36	(4)

International career^{‡}
2022–2023	Cambodia U23	14	(4)
2021–	Cambodia	28	(2)
Medal record
Men's football
Representing Cambodia
FIFA ASEAN Challenge Cup
Runner-up	2026 Hong Kong
- * Club domestic league appearances and goals as of 9 November 2026 ‡ National team caps and goals as of 5 October 2026

Sa Ty (born 4 April 2002) is a Cambodian professional footballer plays as a winger or a forward for Cambodian Premier League club Phnom Penh Crown and the Cambodia national team.

== Professional career ==
=== Electrite du Cambodge ===
Sa Ty started his professional career with Electricite du Cambodge in 2020 after graduated from Bati Youth Football Academy.

=== Visakha ===
Sa Ty joined Visakha in January 2022.

=== Phnom Penh Crown ===
Sa Ty joined Phnom Penh Crown in July 2025. He quickly became a fan favourite after moving from league rival, Visakha.

== International career ==
Sa Ty make his Cambodia national team debut in the 2020 AFF Championship coming on as a substitution against Vietnam on 19 December 2021.

On 7 June 2024, he scored his first international goal in a 2–0 victory during the friendly match against Mongolia. On 11 June in the reverse fixtures in Ulaanbaatar, he scored his second international goal but later counted as an own goal from Mongolia's defender.

== International goals ==
No.	Date	Venue	Opponent	Score	Result	Competition
1.	7 June 2024	Phnom Penh Olympic Stadium, Phnom Penh, Cambodia	Mongolia	2–0	2–0	Friendly
2.	8 December 2024	Phnom Penh Olympic Stadium, Phnom Penh, Cambodia	Malaysia	2–1	2–2	2024 ASEAN Championship
