= Akarapong Pumwisat =

Thai footballer (born 1995)

Personal information
- Full name: Akarapong Pumwisat
- Date of birth: 23 November 1995 (age 30)
- Place of birth: Chumphon, Thailand
- Height: 1.75 m (5 ft 9 in)
- Position: Midfielder

Team information
- Current team: BG Pathum United

Youth career
- 2010–2013: Patumkongka School

Senior career*
Years	Team	Apps	(Gls)
2014–2018	Chumphon	62	(4)
2018–2019	Banbueng Phuket City	23	(1)
2019–2026	Lamphun Warriors	153	(24)
2026–	BG Pathum United	0	(0)

International career^{‡}
2024–	Thailand	9	(2)
Medal record
Thailand
ASEAN Championship
Runner-up	ASEAN 2024	Team
- * Club domestic league appearances and goals as of 14:58, 6 January 2025 (UTC) ‡ National team caps and goals as of 14:58, 6 January 2025 (UTC)

Akarapong Pumwisat (Thai: อัครพงศ์ พุ่มวิเศษ, RTGS: Akharaphong Phumwiset, pronounced [a.kʰa.ra.pʰoŋ.pʰûm.wi.seːt], born 23 November 1995) is a Thai professional footballer who plays as a midfielder for Thai League 1 club BG Pathum United and the Thailand national team.

== International career ==
In 2024, he was named in Thailand's squad by Masatada Ishii for the 2026 FIFA World Cup qualification in the match with China and Singapore on 6 and 11 June 2024 respectively.

Pumwisat made his debut on 10 September 2024 in a 2024 LPBank Cup game against Vietnam at the Mỹ Đình National Stadium. In November 2024, he was selected in the Thailand squad for the 2024 ASEAN Championship.

=== International goals ===
No.	Date	Venue	Opponent	Score	Result	Competition
1.	20 December 2024	Rajamangala National Stadium, Bangkok, Thailand	Cambodia	1–1	3–2	2024 ASEAN Championship
2.	20 December 2024	Rajamangala National Stadium, Bangkok, Thailand	Cambodia	2–1	3–2	2024 ASEAN Championship

== Honours ==
=== Club ===
Lamphun Warriors

- Thai League 2: 2021–22
- Thai League 3: 2020–21
