= Olagar Xavier =

Timorese footballer

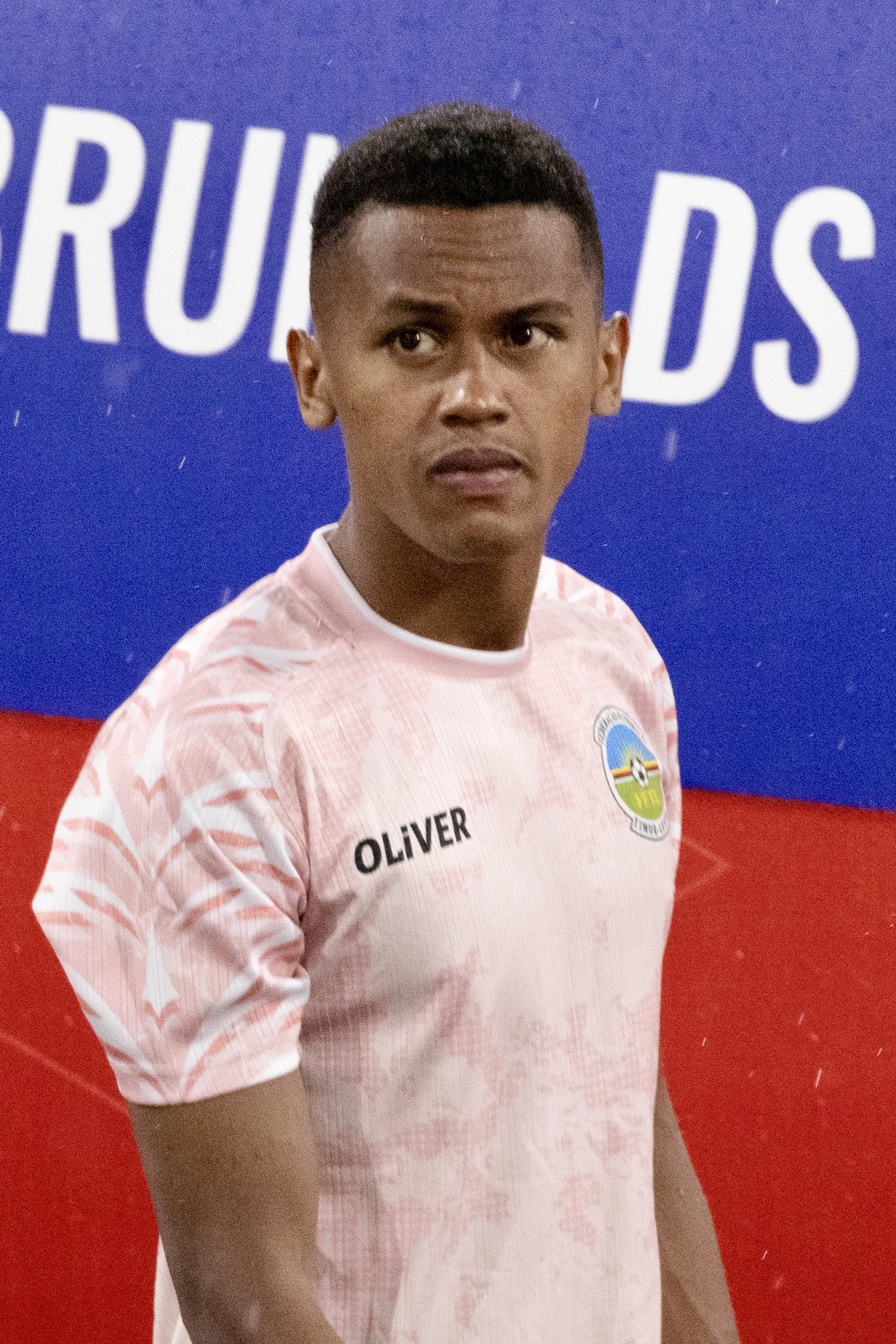
- Xavier with Timor-Leste national team in 2024

Personal information
- Full name: Olagar Fernando Malik Xavier
- Date of birth: 18 May 2003 (age 23)
- Place of birth: Ainaro, Timor-Leste
- Height: 1.83 m (6 ft 0 in)
- Position: Forward

Team information
- Current team: AD San Antonio

Senior career*
Years	Team	Apps	(Gls)
2021–2023	Ponta Leste		
2023–2024	Siem Reap	11	(5)
2025	Master	4	(1)
2025	Karketu Dili		
2025–2026	Aguilas–UMak	7	(3)
2026	Karketu Dili		
2026–	AD San Antonio		

International career^{‡}
2022–	Timor-Leste	21	(1)
- * Club domestic league appearances and goals as of 18 June 2026 ‡ National team caps and goals as of 30 September 2026

Olagar Fernando Malik Xavier (born 18 May 2003), also known as Kaka, is a Timorese professional footballer who plays as a forward for Liga Futebol Timor-Leste club AD San Antonio and the Timor-Leste national team.

== Club career ==
=== Ponta Leste ===
As a youth, Xavier played for Ponta Leste of the Liga Futebol Timor-Leste.

=== Siem Reap ===
On 15 September 2023, it was announced that Xavier had joined second tier Cambodian club Siem Reap which plays in the Cambodian League 2.

=== Thimphu City ===
On 25 April 2024, Xavier moved to Bhutan Premier League club Thimphu City making him the first Timorese footballer to play in the league. On 14 May, he scored a goal in a 3–1 league win against Tensung.

== International career ==
Xavier made his senior international debut on 27 January 2022 in a friendly with Indonesia. Later that year, he was part of the Timor-Leste squad that competed in 2022 AFF Championship qualification. In August 2023, he competed for his nation in the 2023 AFF U-23 Championship. He scored the team's only goal in the competition in a 1–3 defeat to Malaysia in the final match of the group stage.

Xavier scored his first senior international goal on 11 December 2024 at the Bukit Jalil National Stadium against Malaysia during the 2024 ASEAN Championship.

=== International career statistics ===
As of match played 30 September 2026

Timor-Leste national team
Year	Apps	Goals
2022	3	0
2023	2	0
2024	8	1
2025	3	0
2026	5	0
Total	21	1

=== International goals ===
Scores and results list Timor-Leste's goal tally first.

No.	Date	Venue	Opponent	Score	Result	Competition
1.	11 December 2024	Bukit Jalil National Stadium, Kuala Lumpur, Malaysia	Malaysia	1–1	2–3	2024 ASEAN Championship

== Honours ==
Karketu Dili

- Primeira Divisão: 2025
