= Pau Martí (football manager) =

Spanish football manager (born 1983)

Personal information
- Full name: Pau Martí Vicente
- Date of birth: 29 September 1983 (age 43)
- Place of birth: Barcelona, Spain

Managerial career
- Years: Team
- 2011–2013: Kitchee (youth)
- 2011–2012: Resources Capital
- 2012–2013: Kitchee (assistant)
- 2012–2013: Hong Kong (analyst)
- 2013–2017: Adelaide United (assistant)
- 2017–2022: Barcelona (youth)
- 2018–2021: Barcelona B (assistant)
- 2022–2024: Malaysia (assistant)
- 2024: Malaysia (caretaker)

Pau Martí Vicente (born 29 September 1983) is a Spanish football manager who recently worked as the interim head coach of Malaysia national football team.

== Managerial career ==
Martí holds a UEFA Pro License. In 2011, he was appointed as a youth coach of Hong Kong side Kitchee. In the same year, Martí was also appointed head coach of Hong Kong side Resources Capital. He held his first managerial match on 11 September 2011 in a 1–0 lost to HKFC.

In July 2012, Martí was promoted to assistant of Kitchee working under head coach Josep Gombau. Shortly afterwards November, he was appointed as an analyst for the Hong Kong national team.

In July 2013, Martí was appointed as an assistant manager of Australian side Adelaide United reunited with Josep Gombau at the club. He left Adelaide United on 11 May 2017.

On 26 September 2017, Martí was appointed as a youth manager of Spanish La Liga side Barcelona, before being promoted to assistant manager of the club's reserve team.

On 17 February 2022, Martí was appointed as an assistant manager of the Malaysia national team working under Kim Pan-gon. After Kim Pan-gon left, he was promoted as the caretaker of Malaysia on 16 July 2024. While managing the team, he helped them win the 2024 Merdeka Tournament. The 2024 ASEAN Championship was his final managerial duty for the team. He led the Malaysian team to a 2–2 draw with Cambodia, a 3–2 victory against East Timor, a loss of 0–1 to Thailand and a 0–0 draw with Singapore who managed to hold the team despite playing at their home ground.

== Managerial statistics ==
As of match played 20 December 2024

Managerial record by team and tenure
Team	Nat	From	To	Record				
Team	Nat	From	To	G	W	D	L	Win%
Tai Chung	(Hong Kong)	1 July 2011	30 June 2012	22	7	4	11	31.82
Malaysia (Caretaker)	(Malaysia)	16 July 2024	20 December 2024	9	4	3	2	44.44
Career Total				31	11	7	13	35.48
