= Patrik Gustavsson =

Thai footballer

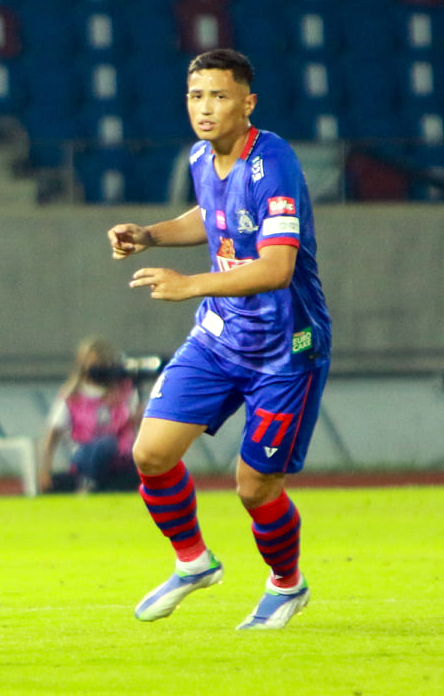
- Gustavsson playing for Chiangmai in 2022

Personal information
- Full name: Patrik Gustavsson
- Date of birth: 19 April 2001 (age 25)
- Place of birth: Oxelösund, Sweden
- Height: 1.84 m (6 ft 0 in)
- Position: Striker

Team information
- Current team: BG Pathum United
- Number: 11

Youth career
- 2010–2013: Oxelösunds
- 2014–2017: Åtvidabergs

Senior career*
Years	Team	Apps	(Gls)
2018–2021	Åtvidabergs	21	(0)
2021–2022	IF Sylvia	29	(10)
2022–	BG Pathum United	28	(5)
2022	→ Chiangmai (loan)	24	(3)
2024	→ Nara Club (loan)	25	(2)

International career^{‡}
2022	Thailand U23	12	(3)
2024–	Thailand	15	(8)
Medal record
Men's football
Representing Thailand
SEA Games
Silver medal – second place	Vietnam 2021	Team
ASEAN Championship
Runner-up	ASEAN 2024	Team
Runner-up	ASEAN 2026	Team
- * Club domestic league appearances and goals as of 9 January 2026 ‡ National team caps and goals as of 26 August 2026

Patrik Gustavsson (Thai: พาตริก กุสตาฟส์สัน, born 19 April 2001) is a professional footballer who plays as a striker for Thai League 1 club BG Pathum United. Born in Sweden, he represents the Thailand national team.

== Club career ==
=== Youth ===
Gustavsson started his football career with Oxelösunds youth team at the age of nine.

=== Åtvidabergs ===
In 2014, Gustavsson joined Åtvidabergs academy where he got promoted to the senior team in 2018 at the age of 17. He make his professional career debut on 16 June 2018 coming on as a substitution against Torns. On 2 June 2019, Gustavsson got his first goal involvement when he assisted Felix Winter to secure a 3–1 league win over Lindome

=== Sylvia ===
After eight years with Åtvidabergs, Gustavsson completed a transfer to Sylvia in January 2021. He make his debut for the club on 4 March in a 2–0 lost to Sandvikens. On 24 April, Gustavsson scored his first career goal in a 3–1 league lost to Dalkurd. During a league match against Örebro Syrianska, Gustavsson scored a stoppage time winner in the 90th minute in which was also his brace as he helps his team to secure a 3–2 win. Gustavsson went on to finished the season with 10 goals in 29 league appearances.

=== BG Pathum United ===
On 3 January 2022, Gustavsson joined Thai League 1 side BG Pathum United. He make his club debut on 22 January 2023 in a 2–1 lost to Port.

==== Chiangmai (loan) ====
Initially the next day after he joins BG Pathum United, Gustavsson was loaned out to Thai League 2 side Chiangmai. He scored on his debut in a league match against Kasetsart in a 2–0 win on 15 January.

== International career ==
=== Youth ===
On 16 March 2022, Gustavsson was called up to the Thailand U23 squad for the 2022 Dubai Cup U23. On 26 March 2022, he played first national match against China. He scored his first international goal on 6 May 2022 against Malaysia in 2021 Southeast Asian Games. Gustavsson was also called up to the 2022 AFC U-23 Asian Cup in Uzbekistan.

=== Senior ===
Gustavsson made his debut for the senior Thailand national team on 10 September 2024 in a 2024 LPBank Cup game against Vietnam at the Mỹ Đình National Stadium and scored his first international goal, which was also the winning goal in the 40th minute. In November 2024, he was selected in the Thailand squad for the 2024 ASEAN Championship. He went on to score against Timor-Leste, Malaysia, Singapore and Philippines in the tournament. On 21 March 2025, Gustavsson scored a brace in a friendly match against Afghanistan.

=== International goals ===
Scores and results list Thailand's goal tally first.

No.	Date	Venue	Opponent	Score	Result	Competition
1.	10 September 2024	Mỹ Đình National Stadium, Hanoi, Vietnam	Vietnam	2–1	2–1	2024 LPBank Cup
2.	8 December 2024	Hàng Đẫy Stadium, Hanoi, Vietnam	Timor-Leste	2–0	10–0	2024 ASEAN Championship
3.	14 December 2024	Rajamangala Stadium, Bangkok, Thailand	Malaysia	1–0	1–0	2024 ASEAN Championship
4.	17 December 2024	National Stadium, Kallang, Singapore	Singapore	1–2	4–2	2024 ASEAN Championship
5.	30 December 2024	Rajamangala Stadium, Bangkok, Thailand	Philippines	2–0	3–1	2024 ASEAN Championship
6.	21 March 2025	Rajamangala Stadium, Bangkok, Thailand	Afghanistan	1–0	2–0	Friendly
7.	21 March 2025	Rajamangala Stadium, Bangkok, Thailand	Afghanistan	2–0	2–0	Friendly
8.	25 March 2025	Rajamangala Stadium, Bangkok, Thailand	Sri Lanka	1–0	1–0	2027 AFC Asian Cup qualification

== Honours ==
=== Club ===
BG Pathum United

- Thai League Cup runners-up: 2022–23

=== International ===
Thailand U23

- Southeast Asian Games silver medal: 2021

=== Individual ===
- Southeast Asian Games Top scorer: 2021
