= 2024 ASEAN Championship =

Tournament details
- Dates: 8 December 2024 – 5 January 2025
- Teams: 10 (from 1 sub-confederation)
- Venues: 11 (in 10 host cities)

Final positions
- Champions: Vietnam (3rd title)
- Runners-up: Thailand

Tournament statistics
- Matches played: 26
- Goals scored: 91 (3.5 per match)
- Attendance: 392,070 (15,080 per match)
- Top scorer(s): (Vietnam) Nguyễn Xuân Son (7 goals)
- Best player: (Vietnam) Nguyễn Xuân Son
- Best young player: (Thailand) Suphanat Mueanta
- Best goalkeeper: (Vietnam) Nguyễn Đình Triệu

The 2024 ASEAN Championship (officially the ASEAN Mitsubishi Electric Cup 2024 due to sponsorship reasons) was the 15th edition of the ASEAN Championship (formerly the AFF Championship) football tournament of nations affiliated to the ASEAN Football Federation (AFF) and was the last edition sponsored by Mitsubishi Electric.

The final tournament was originally scheduled to run from 23 November to 21 December. However, the AFF decided to change the schedule from 8 December 2024 to 5 January 2025 to avoid conflicts with continental club competitions.

Vietnam secured their third title after defeating the two-time defending champions Thailand by a 5–3 aggregate score in the two-legged final.

== Format ==
The 2024 ASEAN Championship will follow format since 2018. In the current format, the nine highest ranked teams would automatically qualify, with the 10th and 11th ranked teams playing a two-legged qualifiers. The 10 teams would be split in two groups of five and play a round robin system with each team playing two home and two away fixtures. The top two sides of each group will advance to the knockout stages consisting of two-legged semi-finals and finals. Away goals rule would not be applied for the first time since 2010. (Note: Away goals rule had not been applied temporarily in the 2020 edition due to hosted in a centralized venue (Singapore) during COVID-19 pandemic, and applied again in 2022 edition due to restoration of home-and-away venues.)

== Qualification ==
Nine teams automatically qualified to the ASEAN Championship final tournament. They were separated in respective pots, based on performance of the last two editions.

Brunei and East Timor, who were two lowest-performing teams, played a two-legged qualifier to determine the tenth and final qualifier. On 15 October 2024, East Timor beat Brunei 1–0 on aggregate to become the last participant.

Australia, a member since 2013, did not enter the tournament, due to restriction imposed by the AFF.

=== Qualified teams ===
Team	Appearance	Previous best performance
Cambodia	10th	Group stage (1996, 2000, 2002, 2004, 2008, 2016, 2018, 2020, 2022)
Indonesia	15th	Runners-up (2000, 2002, 2004, 2010, 2016, 2020)
Laos	14th	Group stage (1996, 1998, 2000, 2002, 2004, 2007, 2008, 2010, 2012, 2014, 2018, 2020, 2022)
Malaysia	15th	Winners (2010)
Myanmar	15th	Fourth place / Semi-finalists (2004, 2016)
Philippines	14th	Semi-finalists (2010, 2012, 2014, 2018)
Singapore	15th	Winners (1998, 2004, 2007, 2012)
Thailand	15th	Winners (1996, 2000, 2002, 2014, 2016, 2020, 2022)
Timor-Leste	4th	Group stage (2004, 2018, 2020)
Vietnam	15th	Winners (2008, 2018)

== Draw ==
The tournament's official draw was held on 21 May 2024 in Hanoi, Vietnam at 14:00 (GMT+07:00). The pot placements followed each team's progress based on the two previous editions. If the results were equal, the most recent tournament was given priority.

At the time of the draw, the identity of the team that secured qualification was unknown and was automatically placed into Pot 5.

Ranking in the two previous tournaments
Pot	Team	2022	2020	AVG
1	Thailand	1	1	1
1	Vietnam	2	3	2.5
2	Indonesia	4	2	3
2	Malaysia	3	6	4.5
3	Singapore	5	4	4.5
3	Philippines	7	5	6
4	Cambodia	6	7	6.5
4	Myanmar	8	8	8
5	Laos	9	9	9
5	Timor-Leste	NQ	10	n/a

== Schedule ==
All matches were played from 8 December 2024 to 5 January 2025.

Group stage	Schedule Matchday	Group A		Group B	
Group stage	Schedule Matchday	Date	Matches	Date	Matches
Group stage	Matchday 1	8 December 2024	4 v 2; 5 v 1	9 December 2024	4 v 2; 5 v 1
Group stage	Matchday 2	11 December 2024	2 v 5; 3 v 4	12 December 2024	2 v 5; 3 v 4
Group stage	Matchday 3	14 December 2024	5 v 3; 1 v 2	15 December 2024	5 v 3; 1 v 2
Group stage	Matchday 4	17 December 2024	3 v 1; 4 v 5	18 December 2024	3 v 1; 4 v 5
Group stage	Matchday 5	20 December 2024	1 v 4; 2 v 3	21 December 2024	1 v 4; 2 v 3
Knockout stage	Semi-finals				
Knockout stage	Schedule Leg(s)	Date	Matches	Date	Matches
Knockout stage	First leg	26 December 2024	A2 v B1	27 December 2024	B2 v A1
Knockout stage	Second leg	29 December 2024	B1 v A2	30 December 2024	A1 v B2
Knockout stage	Finals				
Knockout stage	Schedule Leg(s)	Date		Matches	
Knockout stage	First leg	2 January 2025		SF Winner 1 v SF Winner 2	
Knockout stage	Second leg	5 January 2025		SF Winner 2 v SF Winner 1	

== Officiating ==
On 4 July 2024, the ASEAN Football Federation (AFF) officially confirmed the comprehensive use of video assistant referee (VAR) technology during the tournament. To ensure uniformity and professionalism, the VAR system was managed by a third-party provider rather than utilising the resources available in member countries. For the group stage matches, ten cameras were deployed to capture the action, with the number increasing to twelve cameras starting from the semi-finals. This initiative marked the first time VAR was used in the senior ASEAN Championship and only the second time it was used in an AFF tournament after the 2024 U-19 Boys Championship.

=== List of officials ===
The following officials were chosen for the competition.

Referees

- (Bahrain) Ismaeel Habib Ali
- (Hong Kong) Tam Ping Wun
- (Hong Kong) Wong Wai Lun
- (Japan) Hiroki Kasahara
- (Japan) Hiroyuki Kimura
- (Japan) Koki Nagamine
- (Japan) Koji Takasaki
- (Japan) Ryo Tanimoto
- (Jordan) Ahmed Faisal Al-Ali
- (Oman) Omar Al-Yaqoubi
- (Qatar) Salman Ahmad Falahi
- (South Korea) Kim Dae-yong
- (South Korea) Kim Woo-sung
- (South Korea) Ko Hyung-jin
- (Saudi Arabia) Mohammed Al-Hoaish
- (Saudi Arabia) Abdullah Dhafer Al-Shehri
- (Uzbekistan) Rustam Lutfullin
- (Uzbekistan) Firdaus Norsafarov
- (Uzbekistan) Akobirxuja Shukurullaev

Assistant referees

- (Bahrain) Salah Abdulaziz Janahi
- (Bahrain) Faisal Alawi Sayed
- (Hong Kong) Lam Nai Kei Sam
- (Hong Kong) So Kai Man
- (Hong Kong) Wong Ping Chung
- (Indonesia) Nurhadi Sulchan
- (Indonesia) Bambang Syamsudar
- (Japan) Takeshi Asada
- (Japan) Jun Mihara
- (Japan) Isao Nishihashi
- (Japan) Takumi Takagi
- (Japan) Yosuke Takebe
- (Japan) Tomoyuki Umeda
- (Japan) Kota Watanabe
- (Japan) Hamamoto Yusuke
- (Jordan) Ayman Faisal Hamzeh Obeidat
- (Jordan) Ahmad Mansour Samara Muhsen
- (Malaysia) Mohd Yusri Muhammad
- (Oman) Abu Bakar
- (Qatar) Khalid Ayed
- (Qatar) Zahy Al-Shmari
- (South Korea) Cheon Jin-Hee
- (South Korea) Jeon Jin-hee
- (South Korea) Kang Dong-ho
- (South Korea) Kwak Seung-soon
- (South Korea) Park Sang-jun
- (South Korea) Yoon Jae-yeol
- (Saudi Arabia) Ibrahim Al-Dakhil
- (Saudi Arabia) Saad Al-Subaie
- (Saudi Arabia) Khalaf Al-Shammari
- (Saudi Arabia) Saad Saud
- (Singapore) Abdul Hannan Abdul Hasim
- (Thailand) Supawan Hinthong
- (Thailand) Warintorn Sassadee
- (Uzbekistan) Bakhtiyorkhuja Shavkatov
- (Uzbekistan) Sanjar Shayusupov
- (Uzbekistan) Timur Gaynulin
- (Uzbekistan) Andrey Tsapenko
- (Uzbekistan) Alisher Usmonov
- (Vietnam) Nguyễn Trung Hậu
- (Vietnam) Nguyễn Trung Việt

Fourth officials

- (Indonesia) Thoriq Alkatiri
- (Indonesia) Yudi Nurcahya
- (Indonesia) Ryan Saputra
- (Malaysia) Mohd Kamil Zakaria Ismail
- (Malaysia) Nazmi Nasaruddin
- (Malaysia) Muhammad Usaid Jamal
- (Malaysia) Razlan Joffri Ali
- (Malaysia) Tuan Mohd Yaasin Tuan Mohd Hanafiah
- (Singapore) Ahmad A'Qashah
- (Singapore) Foo Chuan Hui
- (Thailand) Apichit Nophuan
- (Thailand) Mongkolchai Pechsri
- (Thailand) Pansa Chaisanit
- (Thailand) Songkran Bunmeekiart
- (Thailand) Wiwat Jumpa-on
- (Uzbekistan) Firdaus Norsafarov
- (Vietnam) Hoàng Ngọc Hà
- (Vietnam) Lê Vũ Linh
- (Vietnam) Ngô Duy Lân
- (Vietnam) Nguyễn Mạnh Hải

Video Assistant officials

- (China) Du Jianxin
- (South Korea) Choi Hyun-jai
- (Saudi Arabia) Mohammed Khled Sal Al-Hoish
- (Saudi Arabia) Mamdouh Mufareh Al-Shahdan
- (Singapore) Muhammad Taqi
- (Thailand) Sivakorn Pu-udom

== Venues ==
(Malaysia) Kuala Lumpur	Singapore		(Thailand) Bangkok
Bukit Jalil National Stadium	National Stadium (Note: Singapore played their home games at the Jalan Besar Stadium from the knockout stage, as the National Stadium – Singapore's home stadium in the group stage – was booked for a concert of JJ Lin on 28 and 29 December.)	Jalan Besar Stadium	Rajamangala Stadium
Capacity: 87,500	Capacity: 55,000	Capacity: 10,000	Capacity: 51,560
(Myanmar) Yangon	Location of stadiums of the 2024 ASEAN Championship.		(Cambodia) Phnom Penh
Thuwunna Stadium	Location of stadiums of the 2024 ASEAN Championship.		Olympic Stadium
Capacity: 50,000	Location of stadiums of the 2024 ASEAN Championship.		Capacity: 50,000
(Laos) Vientiane	Location of stadiums of the 2024 ASEAN Championship.		(Vietnam) Hanoi
New Laos National Stadium	Location of stadiums of the 2024 ASEAN Championship.		Hàng Đẫy Stadium (Note: East Timor played their home games in a neutral venue, due to the National Stadium in Dili failing to meet FIFA standards.)
Capacity: 25,000	Location of stadiums of the 2024 ASEAN Championship.		Capacity: 22,500
(Vietnam) Việt Trì	(Indonesia) Surakarta		(Philippines) Manila
Việt Trì Stadium (Note: Vietnam originally planned to play its home matches at the Mỹ Đình National Stadium, but later the stadium was booked for a concert on 7 and 9 December. As a result, Vietnam hosted its game at the Việt Trì Stadium.)	Manahan Stadium (Note: Indonesia played their group stage games in Surakarta, before moving to either Pakansari Stadium in Bogor or Gelora Bung Tomo Stadium in Surabaya had they qualified to the knockouts.)		Rizal Memorial Stadium
Capacity: 20,000	Capacity: 20,000		Capacity: 12,880

== Group stage ==
Tiebreakers

Ranking in each group was determined as follows:

1. Greater number of points obtained in all the group matches;
2. Goal difference in all the group matches;
3. Greater number of goals scored in all the group matches.

If two or more teams were equal on the basis on the above three criteria, the placement was determined as follows:

1. Result of the direct match between the teams concerned;
2. Penalty shoot-out if only two teams were tied, and they met in the last round of the group;
3. Drawing of lots by the Organising Committee.

=== Group A ===
Pos	Team	Pld	W	D	L	GF	GA	GD	Pts	Qualification
1	Thailand	4	4	0	0	18	4	+14	12	Advance to knockout stage
2	Singapore	4	2	1	1	7	5	+2	7	Advance to knockout stage
3	Malaysia	4	1	2	1	5	5	0	5	
4	Cambodia	4	1	1	2	7	8	−1	4	
5	Timor-Leste	4	0	0	4	3	18	−15	0	Play qualification for the next edition

Source: ASEAN United FC
8 December 2024
17:45 UTC+7

Cambodia	2–2	Malaysia
Abdel Kader 52'; Ty 60'	Report	Wilkin 35'; Tierney 74'

Olympic Stadium, Phnom Penh
Attendance: 24,886
Referee: Kim Woo-sung (South Korea)
8 December 2024
20:00 UTC+7

Timor-Leste	0–10	Thailand
	Report	Davis 4', 32'; Gustavsson 17'; Suphanat 28', 54'; Seksan 56', 61'; Teerasak 79', 90+2'; Mickelson 90+3'

Hàng Đẫy Stadium, Hanoi (Vietnam)
Attendance: 1,239
Referee: Kim Dae-yong (South Korea)

11 December 2024
19:00 UTC+8

Singapore	2–1	Cambodia
Faris 9'; Shawal 16'	Report	Chanthea 59'

National Stadium, Singapore
Attendance: 12,391
Referee: Ahmed Faisal Al-Ali (Jordan)
11 December 2024
21:00 UTC+8

Malaysia	3–2	Timor-Leste
Syafiq 37'; Josué 70', 83'	Report	Xavier 45+1'; João Pedro 45+3'

Bukit Jalil National Stadium, Kuala Lumpur
Attendance: 7,420
Referee: Omar Al-Yaqoubi (Oman)

14 December 2024
17:30 UTC+7

Timor-Leste	0–3	Singapore
	Report	Nakamura 76' (pen.); Shawal 83', 90'

Hàng Đẫy Stadium, Hanoi (Vietnam)
Attendance: 1,000
Referee: Ko Hyung-jin (South Korea)
14 December 2024
20:00 UTC+7

Thailand	1–0	Malaysia
Gustavsson 57'	Report

Rajamangala Stadium, Bangkok
Attendance: 25,619
Referee: Rustam Lutfullin (Uzbekistan)

17 December 2024
17:45 UTC+7

Cambodia	2–1	Timor-Leste
Rotana 42'; Soknet 79'	Report	João Pedro 22'

Olympic Stadium, Phnom Penh
Attendance: 17,109
Referee: Firdaus Norsafarov (Uzbekistan)
17 December 2024
20:30 UTC+8

Singapore	2–4	Thailand
Shawal 10'; Faris 34'	Report	Gustavsson 45+3'; Suphanat 52'; Peeradol 90+3'; Teerasak 90+15'

National Stadium, Singapore
Attendance: 22,611
Referee: Ismaeel Habib Ali (Bahrain)

20 December 2024
20:00 UTC+7

Thailand	3–2	Cambodia
Akarapong 33', 78'; Chalermsak 84'	Report	Nieto 32'; Abdel Kader 90+6'

Rajamangala Stadium, Bangkok
Attendance: 15,261
Referee: Tam Ping Wun (Hong Kong)
20 December 2024
21:00 UTC+8

Malaysia	0–0	Singapore
	Report

Bukit Jalil National Stadium, Kuala Lumpur
Attendance: 31,127
Referee: Hiroyuki Kimura (Japan)

=== Group B ===
Pos	Team	Pld	W	D	L	GF	GA	GD	Pts	Qualification
1	Vietnam	4	3	1	0	11	2	+9	10	Advance to knockout stage
2	Philippines	4	1	3	0	4	3	+1	6	Advance to knockout stage
3	Indonesia	4	1	1	2	4	5	−1	4	
4	Myanmar	4	1	1	2	4	9	−5	4	
5	Laos	4	0	2	2	7	11	−4	2	

Source: ASEAN United FC
9 December 2024
19:00 UTC+6:30

Myanmar	0–1	Indonesia
	Report	Zin Nyi Nyi Aung 76' (o.g.)

Thuwunna Stadium, Yangon
Attendance: 12,500
Referee: Wong Wai Lun (Hong Kong)
9 December 2024
20:00 UTC+7

Laos	1–4	Vietnam
Bounphachan 90+5' (pen.)	Report	Nguyễn Hai Long 58'; Nguyễn Tiến Linh 63'; Nguyễn Văn Toàn 69'; Nguyễn Văn Vĩ 82'

New Laos National Stadium, Vientiane
Attendance: 10,685
Referee: Ko Hyung-jin (South Korea)

12 December 2024
18:30 UTC+8

Philippines	1–1	Myanmar
Kristensen 72' (pen.)	Report	Maung Maung Lwin 25'

Rizal Memorial Stadium, Manila
Attendance: 1,589
Referee: Kim Dae-yong (South Korea)
12 December 2024
20:00 UTC+7

Indonesia	3–3	Laos
Kadek 12'; Ferarri 18', 72'	Report	Phousomboun 9'; Phathana 13'; Peter 77'

Manahan Stadium, Surakarta
Attendance: 14,455
Referee: Hiroki Kasahara (Japan)

15 December 2024
17:30 UTC+7

Laos	1–1	Philippines
Baldisimo 34' (o.g.)	Report	Reyes 77'

New Laos National Stadium, Vientiane
Attendance: 6,389
Referee: Ryo Tanimoto (Japan)
15 December 2024
20:00 UTC+7

Vietnam	1–0	Indonesia
Nguyễn Quang Hải 77'	Report

Việt Trì Stadium, Việt Trì
Attendance: 16,669
Referee: Abdullah Dhafer Al-Shehri (Saudi Arabia)

18 December 2024
17:00 UTC+6:30

Myanmar	3–2	Laos
Lwin Moe Aung 32'; Win Naing Tun 87', 90+3'	Report	Kydavone 77'; Chony 81'

Thuwunna Stadium, Yangon
Attendance: 8,150
Referee: Hiroyuki Kimura (Japan)
18 December 2024
21:00 UTC+8

Philippines	1–1	Vietnam
Gayoso 68'	Report	Doãn Ngọc Tân 90+7'

Rizal Memorial Stadium, Manila
Attendance: 3,346
Referee: Akobirkhuja Shukrullaev (Uzbekistan)

21 December 2024
20:00 UTC+7

Vietnam	5–0	Myanmar
Bùi Vĩ Hào 48'; Nguyễn Xuân Son 55', 90'; Nguyễn Quang Hải 74'; Nguyễn Tiến Linh 90+2'	Report

Việt Trì Stadium, Việt Trì
Attendance: 16,869
Referee: Koki Nagamine (Japan)
21 December 2024
20:00 UTC+7

Indonesia	0–1	Philippines
	Report	Kristensen 63' (pen.)

Manahan Stadium, Surakarta
Attendance: 17,390
Referee: Koji Takasaki (Japan)

== Knockout stage ==
=== Bracket ===
Semi-finals
A2	Singapore	0	1	1
B1	Vietnam	2	3	5
B2	Philippines	2	1	3
A1	Thailand (a.e.t.)	1	3	4

Final
B1	Vietnam	2	3	5
A1	Thailand	1	2	3

=== Semi-finals ===
Team 1	Agg.	Team 2	1st leg	2nd leg
Singapore	1–5	Vietnam	0–2	1–3
Philippines	3–4	Thailand	2–1	1–3 (a.e.t.)

==== First leg ====
26 December 2024
21:00 UTC+8

Singapore	0–2	Vietnam
	Report	Nguyễn Tiến Linh 90+11' (pen.); Nguyễn Xuân Son 90+14'

Jalan Besar Stadium, Singapore
Attendance: 5,233
Referee: Kim Woo-sung (South Korea)
27 December 2024
21:00 UTC+8

Philippines	2–1	Thailand
Reyes 21'; Linares 90+5'	Report	Suphanan 45'

Rizal Memorial Stadium, Manila
Attendance: 10,087
Referee: Kim Dae-yong (South Korea)

==== Second leg ====
29 December 2024
20:00 UTC+7

Vietnam	3–1	Singapore
Nguyễn Xuân Son 45+1' (pen.), 63'; Nguyễn Tiến Linh 90+3' (pen.)	Report	Nakamura 74'

Việt Trì Stadium, Việt Trì
Attendance: 15,583
Referee: Rustam Lutfullin (Uzbekistan)

Vietnam won 5–1 on aggregate.

30 December 2024
20:00 UTC+7

Thailand	3–1 (a.e.t.)	Philippines
Peeradol 37'; Gustavsson 54'; Suphanat 116'	Report	Kristensen 84'

Rajamangala Stadium, Bangkok
Attendance: 31,876
Referee: Hiroyuki Kimura (Japan)

Thailand won 4–3 on aggregate.

=== Final ===
Team 1	Agg.	Team 2	1st leg	2nd leg
Vietnam	5–3	Thailand	2–1	3–2

==== First leg ====
2 January 2025
20:00 UTC+7

Vietnam	2–1	Thailand
Nguyễn Xuân Son 59', 73'	Report	Chalermsak 83'

Việt Trì Stadium, Việt Trì
Attendance: 15,604
Referee: Salman Ahmad Falahi (Qatar)

==== Second leg ====
5 January 2025
20:00 UTC+7

Thailand	2–3	Vietnam
Davis 28'; Supachok 64'	Report	Phạm Tuấn Hải 8'; Pansa 82' (o.g.); Nguyễn Hai Long 90+20'

Rajamangala Stadium, Bangkok
Attendance: 46,982
Referee: Ko Hyung-jin (South Korea)

Vietnam won 5–3 on aggregate.

== Statistics ==
=== Winner ===
2024 ASEAN Championship

Vietnam
Third title

=== Awards ===
Best goalkeeper	MVP	Best young player	Top scorer
(Vietnam) Nguyễn Đình Triệu	(Vietnam) Nguyễn Xuân Son	(Thailand) Suphanat Mueanta	(Vietnam) Nguyễn Xuân Son

=== Goalscorers ===
There were 91 goals scored in 26 matches, for an average of 3.5 goals per match.

7 goals

- (Vietnam) Nguyễn Xuân Son

4 goals

- (Singapore) Shawal Anuar
- (Thailand) Patrik Gustavsson
- (Thailand) Suphanat Mueanta
- (Vietnam) Nguyễn Tiến Linh

3 goals

- (Philippines) Bjørn Martin Kristensen
- (Thailand) Ben Davis
- (Thailand) Teerasak Poeiphimai

2 goals

- (Cambodia) Abdel Kader Coulibaly
- (Indonesia) Muhammad Ferarri
- (Malaysia) Paulo Josué
- (Philippines) Sandro Reyes
- (Myanmar) Win Naing Tun
- (Singapore) Faris Ramli
- (Singapore) Kyoga Nakamura
- (Thailand) Akarapong Pumwisat
- (Thailand) Peeradon Chamratsamee
- (Thailand) Seksan Ratree
- (Thailand) Chalermsak Aukkee
- (Timor-Leste) João Pedro
- (Vietnam) Nguyễn Hai Long
- (Vietnam) Nguyễn Quang Hải

1 goal

- (Cambodia) Hav Soknet
- (Cambodia) Sa Ty
- (Cambodia) Sieng Chanthea
- (Cambodia) Sor Rotana
- (Cambodia) Andrés Nieto
- (Indonesia) Kadek Arel
- (Laos) Bounphachan Bounkong
- (Laos) Chony Waenpaseuth
- (Laos) Kydavone Souvanny
- (Laos) Peter Phanthavong
- (Laos) Phathana Phommathep
- (Laos) Phousomboun Panyavong
- (Malaysia) Fergus Tierney
- (Malaysia) Stuart Wilkin
- (Malaysia) Syafiq Ahmad
- (Myanmar) Lwin Moe Aung
- (Myanmar) Maung Maung Lwin
- (Philippines) Jarvey Gayoso
- (Philippines) Kike Linares
- (Thailand) Nicholas Mickelson
- (Thailand) Supachok Sarachat
- (Thailand) Suphanan Bureerat
- (Timor-Leste) Olagar Xavier
- (Vietnam) Doãn Ngọc Tân
- (Vietnam) Bùi Vĩ Hào
- (Vietnam) Nguyễn Văn Toàn
- (Vietnam) Nguyễn Văn Vĩ
- (Vietnam) Phạm Tuấn Hải

1 own goal

- (Myanmar) Zin Nyi Nyi Aung (against Indonesia)
- (Philippines) Michael Baldisimo (against Laos)
- (Thailand) Pansa Hemviboon (against Vietnam)

=== Discipline ===
In the tournament, a player will be suspended for the subsequent match in the competition for either getting red card or accumulating two yellow cards in two different matches.

Player	Offense(s)	Suspension(s)
(Thailand) Peeradon Chamratsamee	(yellow card) (yellow-red card) in 2022 final 2nd leg v Vietnam	Group A v East Timor (8 December 2024)
(Myanmar) Wai Lin Aung	(yellow card) in Group B v Indonesia; (yellow card) in Group B v Philippines	Group B v Laos (18 December 2024)
(Indonesia) Marselino Ferdinan	(yellow card) (yellow-red card) in Group B v Laos	Group B v Vietnam (15 December 2024)
(Laos) Phathana Phommathep	(yellow card) in Group B v Indonesia; (yellow card) in Group B v Philippines	Group B v Myanmar (18 December 2024)
(Cambodia) Yudai Ogawa	(yellow card) in Group A v Singapore; (yellow card) in Group A v East Timor	Group A v Thailand (20 December 2024)
(Myanmar) Maung Maung Lwin	(yellow card) in Group B v Indonesia; (yellow card) in Group B v Laos	Group B v Vietnam (21 December 2024)
(Philippines) Amani Aguinaldo	(yellow card) in Group B v Indonesia; (yellow card) in Group B v Vietnam	Semi-finals v Thailand (27 December 2024)

=== Tournament teams ranking ===
This table will show the ranking of teams throughout the tournament.

Pos	Team	Pld	W	D	L	GF	GA	GD	Pts	Final result
1	Vietnam	8	7	1	0	21	6	+15	22	Champions
2	Thailand	8	5	0	3	25	12	+13	15	Runners-up
3	Philippines	6	2	3	1	7	7	0	9	Semi-finalists
4	Singapore	6	2	1	3	8	10	−2	7	Semi-finalists
5	Malaysia	4	1	2	1	5	5	0	5	Eliminated in group stage
6	Cambodia	4	1	1	2	7	8	−1	4	Eliminated in group stage
7	Indonesia	4	1	1	2	4	5	−1	4	Eliminated in group stage
8	Myanmar	4	1	1	2	4	9	−5	4	Eliminated in group stage
9	Laos	4	0	2	2	7	11	−4	2	Eliminated in group stage
10	Timor-Leste	4	0	0	4	3	18	−15	0	Eliminated in group stage

Source: ASEAN United FC

== Marketing ==
=== Official match ball ===
The tournament's official match ball, Adidas Tiro Pro, was unveiled on 14 August 2024. This marked the return of Adidas as the ASEAN Championship's official supplier after twenty years.

=== Sponsorship ===
Title Partner	Presenting Partners	Official Sponsors	Official Performance Partner
Mitsubishi Electric	MSIG; Shopee	ALL - Accor Live Limitless; Acecook Vietnam; AirAsia; Amartha; Pocari Sweat; Yanmar	Adidas

== Media coverage ==
2024 ASEAN Championship television broadcasters in Southeast Asia
Country	Broadcasting networks	Television	Radio	Live streaming
Brunei	RTB, Astro	RTB Aneka, Astro Arena	—N/a	RTBGo, Astro GO, Sooka
Cambodia	Bayon Television	BTV Cambodia	—N/a	—N/a
Indonesia	MNC Media	RCTI, GTV, iNews, Soccer Channel, Sportstars	MNC Trijaya FM	Vision+, Blive
Laos	BG Sports Co.	—N/a		BG SPORTS
Malaysia	Astro	Astro Arena	—N/a	Astro GO, Sooka
Myanmar	Sky Net	Sky Net Sports HD, Sky Net Sports 4	—N/a	
Philippines	TAP DMV	Premier Football and Sports channels	—N/a	Matchday+
Singapore	Mediacorp	CH5	—N/a	meWATCH
Thailand	Triple V Broadcast Co., Ltd., BG Sports Co., AIS Play, Kong Salak Plus, TrueVisions, beIN Sports	Thairath TV, True Sports 2, True Sports 7, beIN Sports 1, beIN Sports 2	—N/a	Youtube: THAIRATH TV Originals Thairath Sport BG SPORTS; Facebook: ThairathTV Thairath Sport BG Sports Nok Plus; Online Platforms: AIS Play, TrueVisions Now
Vietnam	FPT Play, VTV	VTV2, VTV5, VTV Cần Thơ	—N/a	FPT Play (Note: Also on FPT Play YouTube channel with an alternative "emotional" commentary.), VTVgo
2024 ASEAN Championship international television broadcasters
Rest of World	YouTube	—N/a	—N/a	ASEAN United FC
China	Leisu	Leisu Sports Channel	—N/a	Leisu TV
South Korea	Eclat Media	SPOTV	—N/a	SPOTV Now

== Incidents ==
=== Hooligan fans problem ===
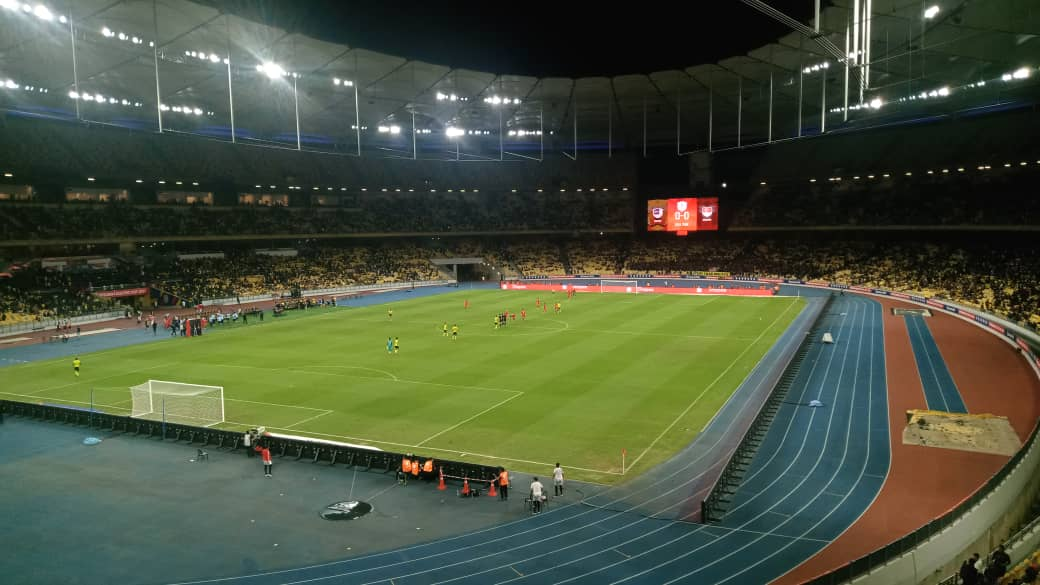
Malaysia's last match against Singapore saw Malaysia failed to qualify for the knockout stage after it ended with a 0-0 draw

On 20 December 2024, following the end of the Group A match between Malaysia and Singapore at Bukit Jalil National Stadium in Kuala Lumpur with subsequent Malaysia elimination, a group of Malaysian fans were seen holding the Singapore flag upside down with middle fingers pointed to it to show their disrespect against the Singapore team. The Bandar Tasik Selatan LRT station was then targeted and damaged by the group. Earlier, a clash between Malaysian and Thai hooligan fans also broken out outside Rajamangala Stadium in Bangkok after Malaysia's match against Thailand on 14 December, in which a Malaysian fan was reportedly injured in the head, while another report suggests three Malaysian fans were injured.

=== Criticism of officiating referees conduct ===
During the 2nd leg semi-finals match between the Philippines and Thailand at Rajamangala Stadium in Bangkok, the Thai side missed out on two penalty kicks when two Filipino players committed handball in the penalty area, but the Japanese referee who officiated the match, Kimura Hiroyuki, still allowed the game to continue without checking on the video assistant referee (VAR). Later during the build-up to Thailand's goal on the 37th minute, it appeared as though the ball was already out of bounds before it was shifted back in by Seksan Ratree, who crossed it into the box for Peeradol Chamrasamee. The goal stood through the decision of referee, despite protests from the Philippine side.

There were incidents where VAR should have interrupted the match, including red card protest following a foul in the 4th minute from Phạm Tuấn Hải's aggressive tackle against Jonathan Khemdee, this occurred just before Tuấn Hải scored for Vietnam later in the 8th minute. There was also a handball incident outside the penalty box by goalkeeper Nguyễn Đình Triệu interrupting goal scoring opportunity for Suphanat Mueanta in the 62nd minute. VAR had checked the penalty possibility in the 85th minute following the tackle by Phạm Xuân Mạnh against Suphanan Bureerat inside the penalty area.

In the 64th minute of the 2nd leg of the 2024 ASEAN Championship final between Thailand and Vietnam, Thailand scored a sudden goal from a long-range shot by Supachok Sarachat, which raised the score to 2–1 for Thailand. Vietnam had kicked the ball out of play due to a Vietnamese player was injured on the field. Then when the ball was in play, the Thai players decided to play the ball and score.

=== Criticism of AFF management of tournament ===
For a long time, AFF Championship has been known for its unprofessional management in many aspects. This year's competition also illustrated many amateur mistakes by authorities, such as scheduling issues, causing most teams to play their multiple matches within less than 72-hour time period, affecting after-match recovery, leading to multiple injuries due to excessive workload compared to the importance and stance of the competition. The tournament does not take place during the FIFA Days calendar, so the points coefficient is the lowest in the FIFA scoring system, reflecting the standard of competition organisation by AFF.

The competition was also well-known for its intensity in terms of match load, causing the teams to travel along the regions to play another match within little timespan between each match.

=== Faulty medal ===
Vietnamese striker Nguyễn Tiến Linh was awarded a "unique" gold medal during the 2024 AFF Championship awards ceremony at Rajamangala Stadium. Although it is a gold medal, it has the words "Runner Up" written on it. This is not the silver medal awarded to the runner-up team but a faulty gold medal since other gold medals awarded to his teammate have the word "Champion" on it. When the organisers awarded the medals, Tiến Linh himself did not realise this, where he and his teammates continued to celebrate and lifted the cup as usual. The Vietnamese team striker still had the medal and took a photo to show off on social media. It was not until online fans pointed out the unusual points in Tiến Linh's photo that the striker discovered it. The Vietnam Football Federation (VFF) then working with the ASEAN Football Federation (AFF) on the matters to exchange a "genuine" medal for Tiến Linh. On 10 January 2025, the Organising Committee received the official complaint and apologised for the unexpected incident with a genuine gold medal to be awarded to Tiến Linh. On 8 February 2025, he proudly shared that he had been sent the official gold medal from the ASEAN Cup organising committee.

== See also ==
- 2024 ASEAN U-16 Boys Championship
- 2024 ASEAN U-19 Boys Championship
- 2024–25 ASEAN Club Championship
