= Omar Al-Yaqoubi =

Omani association football referee (born 1987)

- Full name: Omar Mubarak Mazaroua Al Yaqoubi
- Born: 3 July 1987 (age 39); Ad Dhahirah, Oman

Domestic
Years	League	Role

International
Years	League	Role
2013–	FIFA	Referee

Omar Al-Yaqoubi (Arabic: عمر اليعقوبي; born 3 July 1987) is an Omani association football referee who has been a full international referee for FIFA since 2013.
