= Olympic Stadium (Phnom Penh) =

Multi-purpose stadium in Phnom Penh, Cambodia

National Olympic Stadium
- ពហុកីឡដ្ឋានជាតិអូឡាំពិក
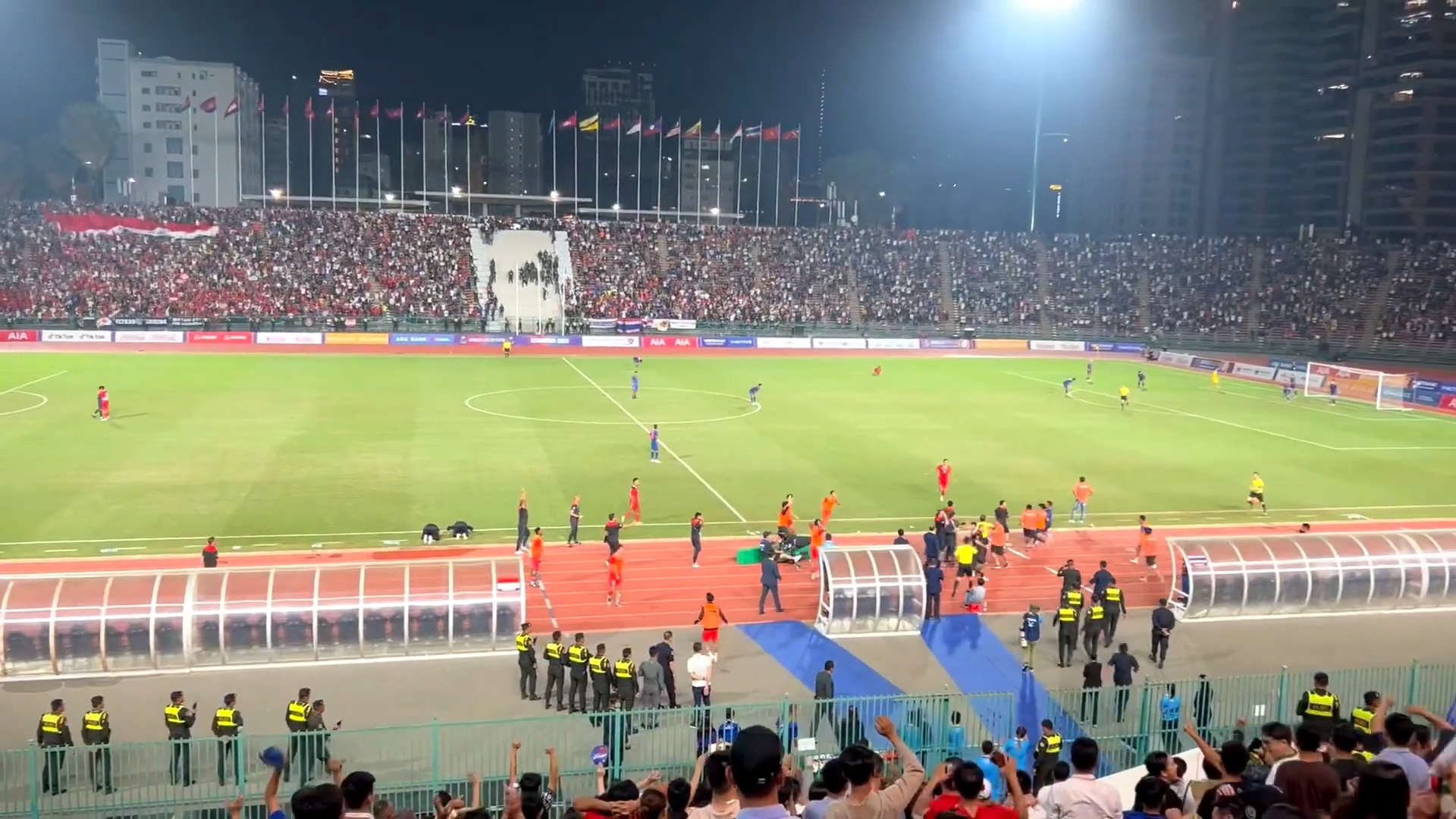
- The stadium during 2023 SEA Games football match
- Interactive map of National Olympic Stadium
- Location: Phnom Penh, Cambodia
- Coordinates: 11°33′30″N 104°54′43″E
- Capacity: 30,000
- Surface: Grass

Construction
- Groundbreaking: 1962
- Opened: 1964; 62 years ago
- Renovated: 2023
- Architect: Vann Molyvann

Tenant
- Cambodia national football team

National Olympic Stadium exterior

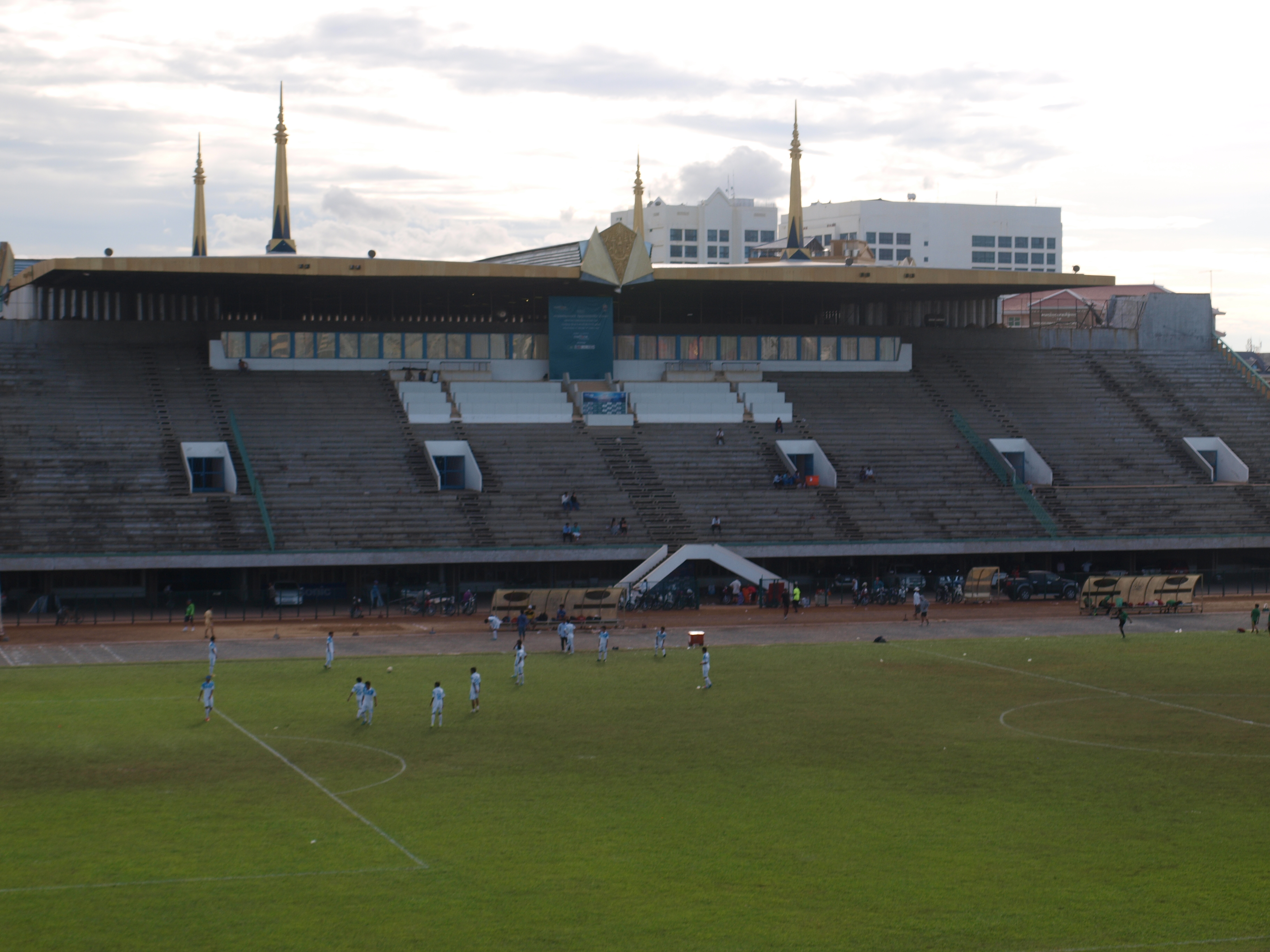
National Olympic Stadium in 2008

The National Olympic Stadium (Khmer: ពហុកីឡដ្ឋានជាតិអូឡាំពិក, romanized: Peăhŭkeilathan Chiat Olămpĭk) is a multi-purpose stadium in Phnom Penh, Cambodia. It has a capacity of 30,000. Despite its name, the stadium has never hosted an Olympic Games.

== History ==
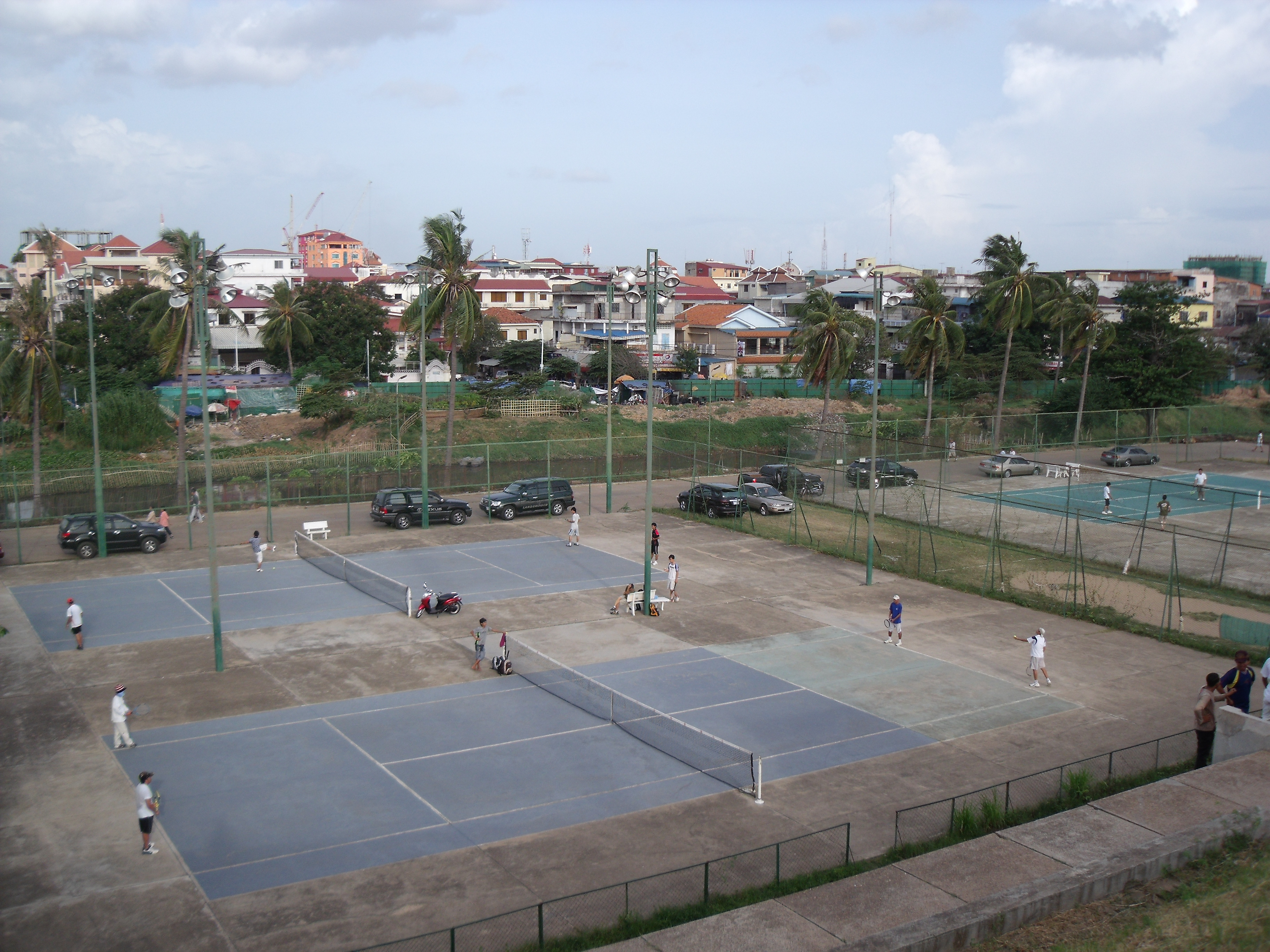
Tennis courts at the Olympic Stadium

Construction on the National Sports Complex started in 1963 and was completed in 1964. Designer Vann Molyvann made use of massive earthworks to create the stadium, digging up 500,000 cubic meters of earth to shape the grounds.

The stadium might have been built to host the 1963 Southeast Asian Peninsular Games, but the games were cancelled due to political problems in Cambodia. There was the short-lived GANEFO games, that were held in Phnom Penh, Cambodia in November 25~December 6, 1966 and were named 'First Asian GANEFO'. The stadium has played host to appearances by visiting dignitaries and state occasions, and has been the home of Cambodia's national athletics teams.

The stadium played a small and integral part in the 1966 FIFA World Cup, when North Korea faced Australia in qualification as the remaining two Asia/Oceania zone teams.

As North Korea lacked diplomatic relations with most countries and did not have a FIFA-standard venue at the time, and the Australian immigration laws in force meant the North Korean team would be unlikely to receive visas to enter the country, finding a suitable venue for the match proved difficult until Chief of State Norodom Sihanouk, an ally of Kim Il Sung, informed FIFA the matches could be held in Phnom Penh.

The matches attracted 60,000 and 55,000 fans, with Sihanouk decreeing half would cheer for Australia, while the other half would cheer for the North Koreans. The matches were held on 21 November 1965 and on 24 November 1965, with North Korea winning both (6–1 and 3–1): as all fifteen African teams had withdrawn in protest after FIFA declined to allocate them a direct place in the final tournament, the Final Round was scratched and North Korea also qualified for the World Cup, where they reached the quarter-finals.

Among the facilities are Olympic size swimming pools for swimming and diving and an indoor volleyball court with a capacity of up to 8,000, now known as the Olympic Stadium Indoor Arena. The diving boards and swimming pools were restored in 2017 after years of disuse, and are now enjoyed daily by the general public.

During the Khmer Rouge era, the stadium was used as an execution site where hundreds of the Khmer Republic’s officials, formerly led by Lon Nol, were killed.

In the decades following the Khmer Rouge era, the stadium facilities fell into disrepair. In 2000, the stadium complex was redeveloped by a Taiwanese firm, the Yuanta Group, which refurbished the stadium and also redeveloped parcels of the complex into condominiums and commercial properties.

The stadium has come to be a popular attraction for Phnom Penh residents, who attend daily exercise sessions, as well as football games and other activities.

In May 2007, the Irish singer Ronan Keating performed in concert in the stadium's Indoor Arena, the first concert by a major international act in Cambodia.

In November–December 2007, the World Organization Volleyball for Disabled held its World Cup in the stadium's Indoor Arena, the first major international sporting event in Cambodia in more than 40 years. Cambodia, seeded fourth in the world, finished third.

In 2010, the stadium hosted all the football matches for the Cambodian Premier League, known for sponsorship purposes as the Metfone C-League.

In 2015, the stadium's grass pitch was replaced with artificial turf.

The 2023 Southeast Asian Games were not held at the Olympic Stadium, but at Morodok Techo National Stadium. Although it was not a main venue, it hosted the Men's football tournament and Women's football finals.

During the COVID-19 pandemic in Cambodia, the stadium was used as a temporary testing facility and later used as an overflow hospital.

In 2023, the stadium's capacity was increased to 30,000 via installation of additional 25,000 individual seats to ensure compliance with the FIFA's and AFC's regulations.

== International matches ==
Date	Competition	Team	Score	Team	Attendance
22 March 2017	International Friendly	Cambodia	2–3	India	50,000
11 Sep 2018	International Friendly	Cambodia	1–3	Malaysia	50,000
8 Nov 2018	2018 AFF Championship	Cambodia	0–1	Malaysia	34,250
20 Nov 2018	2018 AFF Championship	Cambodia	3–1	Laos	25,085
15 June 2023	International Friendly	Cambodia	0–1	Bangladesh	30,000
11 September 2023	International Friendly	Cambodia	1–1	Hong Kong	30,000
11 September 2023	International Friendly	Cambodia	4–0	Macau	30,000
12 October 2023	2026 FIFA World Cup qualification	Cambodia	0–0	Pakistan	11,500
7 June 2024	International Friendly	Cambodia	2–0	Mongolia	15,266
10 September 2024	2027 AFC Asian Cup qualification	Cambodia	2–2 (2–4 p)	Sri Lanka	14,178
11 October 2024	International Friendly	Cambodia	3–2	Chinese Taipei	
8 December 2024	2024 ASEAN Championship	Cambodia	2–2	Malaysia	24,886
17 December 2024	2024 ASEAN Championship	Cambodia	2–1	Timor-Leste	17,109

2023 Southeast Asian Games
Date	Team	Score	Team	Attendance
29 Apr 2023	Cambodia	4–0	Timor-Leste	29,985
2 May 2023	Cambodia	1–1	Philippines	30,118
07 May 2023	Cambodia	0–2	Myanmar	30,115
10 May 2023	Cambodia	1–2	Indonesia	29,168

== See also ==
- Sport in Cambodia
- List of Southeast Asia stadiums by capacity
