= Lebanon national football team results (2020–present) =

This is a list of the Lebanon national football team results from 2020 to present.

== Results ==
Legend for encounters
R2	Second round
R3	Third round
GS	Group stage
SF	Semi-final
F	Final

=== 2020 ===
12 November 2020 Friendly	Bahrain	3–1	Lebanon	Dubai, United Arab Emirates
18:00 UTC+4	Sayed Isa 53'; Al Aswad 58'; Marhoon 82'	Report	Kdouh 44'	Stadium: Police Officers' Club Stadium; Attendance: 0 Referee: Ahmed Al Ali (Kuwait)
Note: Match played behind closed doors due to the COVID-19 pandemic

=== 2021 ===
24 March 2021 Friendly	Jordan	1–0	Lebanon	Dubai, United Arab Emirates
18:00 UTC+4	Al-Taamari 50'	Report		Stadium: Theyab Awana Stadium; Attendance: 0 Referee: Mohammed Abdulla Hassan Mohamed (United Arab Emirates)
Note: Match played behind closed doors due to the COVID-19 pandemic

29 March 2021 Friendly	Kuwait	1–1	Lebanon	Dubai, United Arab Emirates
18:45 UTC+4	Al-Khaldi 15'	Report	Kdouh 60'	Stadium: Police Officers' Club Stadium; Attendance: 0 Referee: Ammar Ali Al Jneibi (United Arab Emirates)
Note: Match played behind closed doors due to the COVID-19 pandemic

5 June 2021 2022 World Cup qualification R2	Lebanon	3–2	Sri Lanka	Goyang, South Korea
15:00 UTC+9	Oumari 11', 44'; Kdouh 17'	Report	Razeek 10', 61' (pen.)	Stadium: Goyang Stadium; Attendance: 0 Referee: Ahmad Ibrahim (Jordan)
Note: Match played behind closed doors due to the COVID-19 pandemic

9 June 2021 2022 World Cup qualification R2	Turkmenistan	3–2	Lebanon	Goyang, South Korea
15:00 UTC+9	Babajanow 59'; Annagulyýew 85'; Annadurdyýew 90+2'	Report	Ataya 73'; Saad 75'	Stadium: Goyang Stadium; Attendance: 0 Referee: Hanna Hattab (Syria)
Note: Match played behind closed doors due to the COVID-19 pandemic

13 June 2021 2022 World Cup qualification R2	South Korea	2–1	Lebanon	Goyang, South Korea
15:00 UTC+9	Song Min-kyu 50'; Son Heung-min 65' (pen.)	Report	Saad 12'	Stadium: Goyang Stadium; Attendance: 4,061; Referee: Khamis Al-Marri (Qatar)

23 June 2021 2021 FIFA Arab Cup qualification	Lebanon	1–0	Djibouti	Al Rayyan, Qatar
20:00 UTC+3	El-Helwe 46'	Report		Stadium: Khalifa International Stadium; Referee: Benoît Bastien (France)

2 September 2021 2022 World Cup qualification R3	United Arab Emirates	0–0	Lebanon	Dubai, United Arab Emirates
20:45 UTC+4		Report		Stadium: Zabeel Stadium; Referee: Ma Ning (China PR)

7 September 2021 2022 World Cup qualification R3	South Korea	1–0	Lebanon	Suwon, South Korea
20:00 UTC+9	Kwon Chang-hoon 59'	Report		Stadium: Suwon World Cup Stadium; Attendance: 0 Referee: Ryuji Sato (Japan)

7 October 2021 2022 World Cup qualification R3	Iraq	0–0	Lebanon	Al Rayyan, Qatar
17:30 UTC+3		Report		Stadium: Khalifa International Stadium; Attendance: 0 Referee: Turki Al-Khudhayr (Saudi Arabia)

12 October 2021 2022 World Cup qualification R3	Syria	2–3	Lebanon	Amman, Jordan
19:00 UTC+3	Khribin 20'; Al Somah 65'	Report	Kdouh 45+1', 45+3'; Saad 53'	Stadium: King Abdullah II Stadium; Attendance: 2,377; Referee: Chris Beath (Australia)

11 November 2021 2022 World Cup qualification R3	Lebanon	1–2	Iran	Sidon, Lebanon
14:00 UTC+2	Saad 37'	Report	Azmoun 90+1'; Nourollahi 90+5'	Stadium: Saida Municipal Stadium; Attendance: 0 Referee: Abdulrahman Al-Jassim (Qatar)

16 November 2021 2022 World Cup qualification R3	Lebanon	0–1	United Arab Emirates	Sidon, Lebanon
14:00 UTC+2		Report	Mabkhout 85' (pen.)	Stadium: Saida Municipal Stadium; Attendance: 0 Referee: Shaun Evans (Australia)

1 December 2021 2021 FIFA Arab Cup GS	Egypt	1–0	Lebanon	Doha, Qatar
16:00 UTC+3	Magdy 71' (pen.)	Report		Stadium: Al Thumama Stadium; Referee: Daniel Siebert (Germany)

4 December 2021 2021 FIFA Arab Cup GS	Lebanon	0–2	Algeria	Al Wakrah, Qatar
16:00 UTC+3		Report	Brahimi 69' (pen.); Meziani 90+3'	Stadium: Al Janoub Stadium; Referee: Szymon Marciniak (Poland)

7 December 2021 2021 FIFA Arab Cup GS	Lebanon	1–0	Sudan	Al Rayyan, Qatar
22:00 UTC+3	Abu Eshrein 76' (o.g.)	Report		Stadium: Education City Stadium; Referee: Fernando Hernández Gómez (Mexico)

=== 2022 ===
27 January 2022 2022 World Cup qualification R3	Lebanon	0–1	South Korea	Sidon, Lebanon
14:00 UTC+2		Report	Cho Gue-sung 45+1'	Stadium: Saida Municipal Stadium; Attendance: 5,400; Referee: Ahmed Al-Kaf (Oman)

1 February 2022 2022 World Cup qualification R3	Lebanon	1–1	Iraq	Sidon, Lebanon
14:00 UTC+2	Sabra 45+2'	Report	Hussein 39'	Stadium: Saida Municipal Stadium; Attendance: 6,341; Referee: Adham Makhadmeh (Jordan)

24 March 2022 2022 World Cup qualification R3	Lebanon	0–3	Syria	Sidon, Lebanon
14:00 UTC+2		Report	Al Dali 14'; Mardikian 38' (pen.); Al Marmour 44'	Stadium: Saida Municipal Stadium; Attendance: 5,422; Referee: Abdulrahman Al-Jassim (Qatar)

29 March 2022 2022 World Cup qualification R3	Iran	2–0	Lebanon	Mashhad, Iran
16:00 UTC+4:30	Azmoun 35'; Jahanbakhsh 62'	Report		Stadium: Imam Reza Stadium; Attendance: 22,453; Referee: Fu Ming (China)

19 November 2022 Friendly	Kuwait	2–0	Lebanon	Dubai, United Arab Emirates
19:00 UTC+4	Zayid 71' (pen.); Bajeyah 83'	Report		Stadium: Police Officers' Club Stadium; Referee: Ahmed Eisa Darwish (United Arab Emirates)

30 December 2022 Friendly	United Arab Emirates	1–0	Lebanon	Dubai, United Arab Emirates
19:30 UTC+4	Tagliabúe 79'	Report		Stadium: Al Maktoum Stadium; Referee: Qasim Al-Hatmi (Oman)

=== 2023 ===
27 March 2023 Friendly	Oman	2–0	Lebanon	Muscat, Oman
22:00 UTC+4	Al Sabhi 27', 80'	Report		Stadium: Sultan Qaboos Sports Complex

9 June 2023 2023 Intercontinental Cup GS	Lebanon	3–1	Vanuatu	Bhubaneswar, India
16:30 UTC+5:30	Matar 59'; Kourani 72'; Darwich 85' (pen.)	Report	Welwel 61'	Stadium: Kalinga Stadium; Referee: Harish Kundu (India)

12 June 2023 2023 Intercontinental Cup GS	Mongolia	0–0	Lebanon	Bhubaneswar, India
16:30 UTC+5:30		Report		Stadium: Kalinga Stadium; Referee: Ramachandran Venkatesh (India)

15 June 2023 2023 Intercontinental Cup GS	India	0–0	Lebanon	Bhubaneswar, India
19:30 UTC+5:30		Report		Stadium: Kalinga Stadium; Referee: Javiz Mohamed (Maldives)

18 June 2023 2023 Intercontinental Cup F	India	2–0	Lebanon	Bhubaneswar, India
19:30 UTC+5:30	Chhetri 46'; Chhangte 65'	Report		Stadium: Kalinga Stadium; Attendance: 12,600; Referee: Virendha Rai (Bhutan)

22 June 2023 2023 SAFF Championship GS	Lebanon	2–0	Bangladesh	Bangalore, India
15:30 UTC+5:30	Maatouk 80'; Bader 90+6'	Report		Stadium: Sree Kanteerava Stadium; Attendance: 50; Referee: Crystal John (India)

25 June 2023 2023 SAFF Championship GS	Bhutan	1–4	Lebanon	Bangalore, India
19:30 UTC+5:30	Gyeltshen 79'	Report	Sadek 11'; Al Haj 23'; Bader 35'; M. Zein 43'	Stadium: Sree Kanteerava Stadium; Attendance: 250; Referee: Irshad Ul Haq (Pakistan)

28 June 2023 2023 SAFF Championship GS	Lebanon	1–0	Maldives	Bangalore, India
15:30 UTC+5:30	Maatouk 23'	Report		Stadium: Sree Kanteerava Stadium; Attendance: 50; Referee: Pema Tshewang (Bhutan)

1 July 2023 2023 SAFF Championship SF	Lebanon	0–0 (a.e.t.) (2–4 p)	India	Bangalore, India
19:30 UTC+5:30		Report		Stadium: Sree Kanteerava Stadium; Attendance: 19,640; Referee: Hussain Sinan (Maldives)
	Penalties
	Maatouk (penalty missed); Shour (penalty scored); Sadek (penalty scored); Bader (penalty missed)		(penalty scored) Chhetri; (penalty scored) A. Ali; (penalty scored) Mahesh; (penalty scored) Udanta

7 September 2023 2023 King's Cup SF	Thailand	2–1	Lebanon	Chiang Mai, Thailand
20:30 UTC+7	Ayoub 45+3' (o.g.); Teerasil 85'	Report	Jradi 57'	Stadium: 700th Anniversary Stadium; Attendance: 16,583; Referee: Kim Hee Gon (South Korea)

10 September 2023 2023 King's Cup 3rd	Lebanon	1–0	India	Chiang Mai, Thailand
16:00 UTC+5:30	El Zein 77'	Report		Stadium: 700th Anniversary Stadium; Attendance: 13,567; Referee: Torpong Somsingha (Thailand)

12 October 2023 Friendly	Montenegro	3–2	Lebanon	Podgorica, Montenegro
18:00 UTC+2	Kuč 16', 19'; Osmajić 69'	Report	Darwich 65'; Tneich 80'	Stadium: Podgorica City Stadium; Attendance: 1,337; Referee: Eldorjan Hamiti (Albania)

17 October 2023 Friendly	United Arab Emirates	2–1	Lebanon	Dubai, United Arab Emirates
20:00 UTC+4	Canedo 26'; Adil 90+4'	Report	Darwich 34'	Stadium: Al Maktoum Stadium; Referee: Mohamed Adel (Egypt)

16 November 2023 2026 World Cup qualification R2	Lebanon	0–0	Palestine	Sharjah, United Arab Emirates
17:00 UTC+3		Report		Stadium: Khalid bin Mohammed Stadium; Attendance: 200; Referee: Adham Makhadmeh (Jordan)
Note: Lebanon played all their home matches in the 2026 World Cup qualification at a neutral venue, due to the adjacent Gaza war.

21 November 2023 2026 World Cup qualification R2	Bangladesh	1–1	Lebanon	Dhaka, Bangladesh
17:45 UTC+6	Morsalin 72'	Report	Osman 67'	Stadium: Bashundhara Kings Arena; Attendance: 20,000; Referee: Dae-Yong Kim (South Korea)

28 December 2023 Friendly	Lebanon	2–1	Jordan	Tripoli, Lebanon
14:00 UTC+2	Haidar 23'; Mansour 90+3' (pen.)	Report	Al-Dardour 3'	Stadium: Tripoli Municipal Stadium; Attendance: 0 Referee: Maher Al Ali (Lebanon)

=== 2024 ===
4 January 2024 Friendly	Saudi Arabia	1–0	Lebanon	Al Wakrah, Qatar
16:30 UTC+3	Al-Buraikan 48'	Report		Stadium: Al Janoub Stadium; Attendance: 0

12 January 2024 2023 Asian Cup GS	Qatar	3–0	Lebanon	Lusail, Qatar
19:00 UTC+3	Afif 45', 90+6'; Ali 56'	Report		Stadium: Lusail Stadium; Attendance: 82,490; Referee: Alireza Faghani (Australia)

17 January 2024 2023 Asian Cup GS	Lebanon	0–0	China	Doha, Qatar
14:30 UTC+3		Report		Stadium: Al Thumama Stadium; Attendance: 14,137; Referee: Ko Hyung-jin (South Korea)

22 January 2024 2023 Asian Cup GS	Tajikistan	2–1	Lebanon	Al Rayyan, Qatar
18:00 UTC+3	Umarbayev 80'; Khamrokulov 90+2'	Report	Jradi 47'	Stadium: Jassim bin Hamad Stadium; Attendance: 11,843; Referee: Mohanad Qasim Sarray (Iraq)

21 March 2024 2026 World Cup qualification R2	Australia	2–0	Lebanon	Sydney, Australia
20:10 UTC+11	Baccus 5'; Rowles 54'	Report (FIFA); Report (AFC)		Stadium: Western Sydney Stadium; Attendance: 27,026; Referee: Khamis Al-Marri (Qatar)

26 March 2024 2026 World Cup qualification R2	Lebanon	0–5	Australia	Canberra, Australia
19:45 UTC+11		Report (FIFA); Report (AFC)	Yengi 2'; Jradi 47' (o.g.); Goodwin 48', 81'; Iredale 68'	Stadium: Canberra Stadium; Attendance: 25,023; Referee: Mooud Bonyadifard (Iran)
Note: Lebanon played all their home matches in the 2026 World Cup qualification at a neutral venue, due to the adjacent Gaza war.

6 June 2024 2026 World Cup qualification R2	Palestine	0–0	Lebanon	Doha, Qatar
19:00 UTC+3		Report (FIFA); Report (AFC)		Stadium: Jassim bin Hamad Stadium; Attendance: 2,428; Referee: Abdulrahman Al-Jassim (Qatar)
Note: Palestine played all their home matches in the 2026 World Cup qualification at a neutral venue, due to the ongoing Gaza war.

11 June 2024 2026 World Cup qualification R2	Lebanon	4–0	Bangladesh	Al Rayyan, Qatar
19:00 UTC+3	Maatouk 5' (pen.), 49', 60'; Matar 45+2'	Report		Stadium: Khalifa International Stadium; Attendance: 13,721; Referee: Razlan Joffri Ali (Malaysia)
Note: Lebanon played all their home matches in the 2026 World Cup qualification at a neutral venue, due to the adjacent Gaza war.

4 September 2024 2024 Merdeka Tournament SF	Lebanon	1–0	Tajikistan	Kuala Lumpur, Malaysia
16:30 UTC+8	Ayoub 13'	Report; Report		Stadium: Bukit Jalil National Stadium; Attendance: 460; Referee: Mohamad Kamil Zakaria Bin Ismail (Malaysia)

8 September 2024 2024 Merdeka Tournament F	Lebanon	0–1	Malaysia	Kuala Lumpur, Malaysia
21:00 UTC+8		Report; Report	Morales 33'	Stadium: Bukit Jalil National Stadium; Attendance: 10,000; Referee: Thoriq Alkatiri (Indonesia)

14 November 2024 Friendly	Thailand	0–0	Lebanon	Rangsit, Thailand
20:00 UTC+7		Report		Stadium: Thammasat Stadium; Attendance: 5,816; Referee: Tam Ping Wun (Hong Kong)

19 November 2024 Friendly	Myanmar	2–3	Lebanon	Yangon, Myanmar
17:00 UTC+6:30	Thiha Zaw 42'; Maung Maung Lwin 57'	Report	Fakhro 37'; Merheg 75', 84'	Stadium: Thuwunna Stadium; Referee: Lê Vũ Linh (Vietnam)

12 December 2024 Friendly	Kuwait	1–2	Lebanon	Doha, Qatar
18:00 UTC+3	Bouresli 11'	Report	El Zein 76'; Merheg 90'	Stadium: Hamad bin Khalifa Stadium

15 December 2024 Friendly	Kuwait	0–2	Lebanon	Doha, Qatar
18:00 UTC+3		Report	Kassas 4'; Khamis 41'	Stadium: Suheim bin Hamad Stadium

=== 2025 ===
20 March 2025 Friendly	Lebanon	4–0	Timor-Leste	Al Khor, Qatar
21:00 UTC+3	Osman 57'; Budib 85'; Merheg 88', 90'	Report		Stadium: Al-Khor SC Stadium

25 March 2025 2027 Asian Cup qualification	Lebanon	5–0	Brunei	Al Wakrah, Qatar
21:30 UTC+3	Fakhro 5', 28'; Merheg 21'; Chakroun 33'; Haidar 90'	Report; Report (AFC)		Stadium: Saoud bin Abdulrahman Stadium; Attendance: 282; Referee: Venikatesh Ramachandran (India)
Note: Lebanon were required to play all their home matches at a neutral venue due to the ongoing Israeli invasion of Lebanon.

28 May 2025 Friendly	Oman	1–0	Lebanon	Muscat, Oman
20:00 UTC+4	Al-Sabhi 4'	Report		Stadium: Sultan Qaboos Sports Complex

10 June 2025 2027 Asian Cup qualification	Yemen	0–0	Lebanon	Sulaibikhat, Kuwait
20:30 UTC+3		Report; Report (AFC)		Stadium: Jaber Al-Mubarak Al-Hamad Stadium; Attendance: 1,512; Referee: Mahmood Salim Al Majarafi (Bahrain)
Note: Yemen were required to play their home matches at a neutral venue due to the ongoing Yemeni civil war.

8 September 2025 Friendly	Indonesia	0–0	Lebanon	Surabaya, Indonesia
20:30 UTC+7		Report		Stadium: Gelora Bung Tomo Stadium; Attendance: 27,052; Referee: Ko Hyung-jin (South Korea)

9 October 2025 2027 Asian Cup qualification	Lebanon	2–0	Bhutan	Doha, Qatar
19:00 UTC+3	Shour 63'; Ayoub 90+4'	Report; Report (AFC)		Stadium: Grand Hamad Stadium; Attendance: 366; Referee: Morteza Mansourian (Iran)
Note: Lebanon were required to play all their home matches at a neutral venue due to the ongoing Israeli invasion of Lebanon.

14 October 2025 2027 Asian Cup qualification	Bhutan	0–4	Lebanon	Al Wakrah, Qatar
19:00 UTC+3		Report; Report (AFC)	Fakhro 9'; Chakroun 16'; Safwan 20'; Farran 50'	Stadium: Saoud bin Abdulrahman Stadium; Attendance: 397; Referee: Zhang Lei (China)
Note: Bhutan were required to play their home matches at a neutral venue, due to the Changlimithang Stadium in Thimphu failing to meet AFC standards.

18 November 2025 2027 Asian Cup qualification	Brunei	0–3	Lebanon	Bandar Seri Begawan, Brunei
20:15 UTC+8		Report; Report (AFC)	Fakhro 3'; Merheg 45+3'; Chaaban 59'	Stadium: Hassanal Bolkiah National Stadium; Attendance: 2,667; Referee: Hasan Akrami (Iran)

26 November 2025 2025 Arab Cup qualification	Sudan	2–1	Lebanon	Al Rayyan, Qatar
19:00 UTC+3	Haidar 43' (o.g.); Awad 74'	Report	Khamis 30'	Stadium: Al Gharafa Stadium; Attendance: 20,816; Referee: Abdulrahman Al-Jassim (Qatar)

=== 2026 ===
4 June 2026 2027 Asian Cup qualification	Lebanon	0–2	Yemen	Doha, Qatar
19:00 UTC+3		Report; Report (AFC)	Al-Gahwashi 63', 90'	Stadium: Grand Hamad Stadium; Attendance: 2,038; Referee: Clifford Daypuyat (Philippines)
Note: Lebanon were required to play all their home matches at a neutral venue due to the ongoing Israeli invasion of Lebanon.

1 October 2026 Friendly	Lebanon	6–0	Maldives	Bishkek, Kyrgyzstan
20:00 UTC+6	Chakroun 3', 36', 42'; Maish 52' (o.g.); Kassas 83', 90+2'	Report		Stadium: Dolen Omurzakov Stadium; Referee: Alimardon Baynazarov (Kyrgyzstan)

4 October 2026 Friendly	Kyrgyzstan	3–1	Lebanon	Bishkek, Kyrgyzstan
20:00 UTC+6	Abdurakhmanov 19'; Shukurov 31'; Khamis 64' (o.g.)	Report	Budib 62'	Stadium: Dolen Omurzakov Stadium; Referee: Rafael Shafeev (Russia)

13 November 2026 2026 Basra Tournament	Iraq	0–0	Lebanon	Basra, Iraq
18:00 UTC+3		Report		Stadium: Basra International Stadium; Attendance: 21,762; Referee: Ali Abbas (Kuwait)

17 November 2026 2026 Basra Tournament	Lebanon	0–0	Palestine	Basra, Iraq
16:00 UTC+3		Report		Stadium: Basra International Stadium; Referee: Ahmed Kadhim Gatea (Iraq)

== Head-to-head records ==
As of match played 17 November 2026

Head to head records
Opponent	P	W	D	L	GF	GA	W%	D%	L%
Algeria	1	0	0	1	0	2	0	0	100
Australia	2	0	0	2	0	7	0	0	100
Bahrain	1	0	0	1	1	3	0	0	100
Bangladesh	3	2	1	0	7	1	66.67	33.33	0
Bhutan	3	3	0	0	10	1	100	0	0
Brunei	2	2	0	0	8	0	100	0	0
China	1	0	1	0	0	0	0	100	0
Djibouti	1	1	0	0	1	0	100	0	0
Egypt	1	0	0	1	0	1	0	0	100
India	4	1	2	1	1	2	25	50	25
Indonesia	1	0	1	0	0	0	0	100	0
Iran	2	0	0	2	1	4	0	0	100
Iraq	3	0	3	0	1	1	0	100	0
Jordan	2	1	0	1	2	2	50	0	50
Kuwait	4	2	1	1	5	4	50	25	25
Kyrgyzstan	1	0	0	1	1	3	0	0	100
Malaysia	1	0	0	1	0	1	0	0	100
Maldives	2	2	0	0	7	0	100	0	0
Mongolia	1	0	1	0	0	0	0	100	0
Montenegro	1	0	0	1	2	3	0	0	100
Myanmar	1	1	0	0	3	2	100	0	0
Oman	2	0	0	2	0	3	0	0	100
Palestine	3	0	3	0	0	0	0	100	0
Qatar	1	0	0	1	0	3	0	0	100
Saudi Arabia	1	0	0	1	0	1	0	0	100
South Korea	3	0	0	3	1	4	0	0	100
Sri Lanka	1	1	0	0	3	2	100	0	0
Sudan	2	1	0	1	2	2	50	0	50
Syria	2	1	0	1	3	5	50	0	50
Tajikistan	2	1	0	1	2	2	50	0	50
Thailand	2	0	1	1	1	2	0	50	50
Timor-Leste	1	1	0	0	4	0	100	0	0
Turkmenistan	1	0	0	1	2	3	0	0	100
United Arab Emirates	4	0	1	3	1	4	0	25	75
Vanuatu	1	1	0	0	3	1	100	0	0
Yemen	2	0	1	1	0	2	0	50	50
Totals	66	21	16	29	71	71	31.82	24.24	43.94
