= Malaysian football naturalisation scandal =

2025 association football controversy

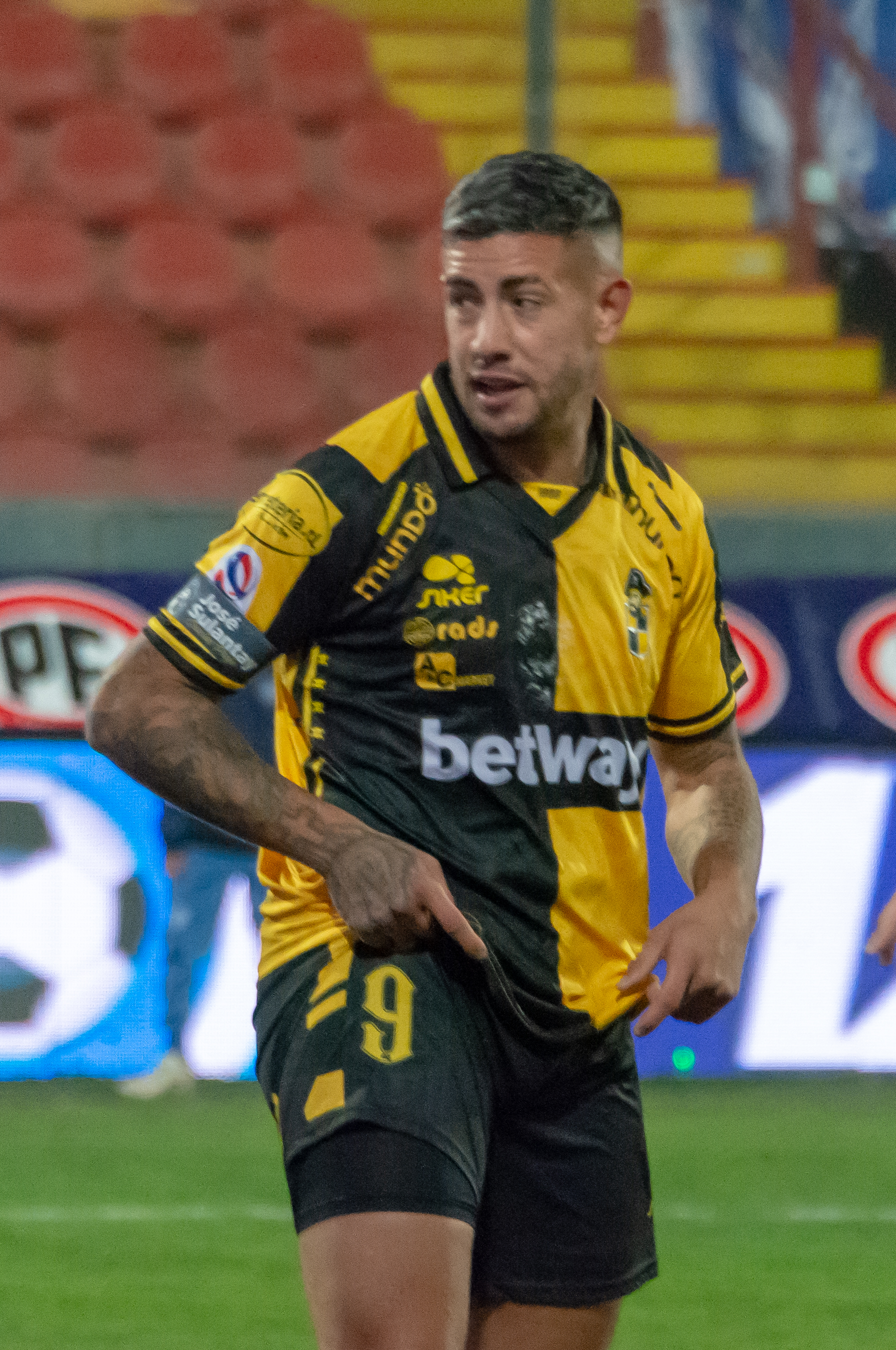
Rodrigo Holgado, among the seven players allegedly naturalised under forged documents

In September 2025, the FIFA Disciplinary Committee fined the Football Association of Malaysia (FAM) and imposed fines and 12-month suspensions on seven foreign-born players of the Malaysia national football team. FIFA found that the players' eligibility rested on forged documents that claimed their grandparents were born in Malaysia; the grandparents had in fact been born in Argentina, Brazil, Spain and the Netherlands. The players had been naturalised as Malaysian citizens under FAM's recruitment of "heritage players", which began after the national team fell to its lowest FIFA ranking in 2018.

FAM denied wrongdoing and appealed the sanctions. The FIFA Appeal Committee rejected it on 3 November 2025, and the Court of Arbitration for Sport dismissed a further appeal on 5 March 2026, while slightly easing the players' punishments. FIFA overturned the results of three of Malaysia's friendlies into 0–3 defeats, and the Asian Football Confederation did the same to the team's wins over Nepal and Vietnam in the 2027 AFC Asian Cup qualifiers, which eliminated Malaysia from the tournament. The scandal put FAM and government agencies responsible for citizenship approvals under public scrutiny. In July 2026, the Enforcement Agency Integrity Commission reported irregularities in the approval of the players' citizenship.

== Background ==
In March 2018, the Malaysia national football team dropped to 178th place in the FIFA rankings, its lowest ever ranking. This prompted the Football Association of Malaysia (FAM) to begin scouting for "heritage players" or players of foreign origin who are asked to change their sporting nationality to play for the national team either through residency or Malaysian ancestry. Between 2018 and October 2025, 23 foreign-born footballers were granted Malaysian citizenship.

== Naturalisation of seven players ==
In January 2025, the Crown Prince of Johor Tunku Ismail Sultan Ibrahim announced that six to seven "heritage players" had been identified for possible inclusion in the national football team. He expressed hope that the Malaysian government would assist them in obtaining Malaysian passports to enable their participation in the 2027 AFC Asian Cup qualifiers. Tunku Ismail also owns Johor Darul Ta'zim (JDT), a club he financed for more than a decade. From March to June 2025, FAM processed the FIFA eligibility for seven players by submitting their birth certificates as well as those of their grandparents. FIFA cleared the players, who were ruled eligible to play for the Malaysian national team.

The seven players were:

Name	Non-Malaysian nationality
Facundo Garcés	Argentina
Rodrigo Holgado	Argentina
Imanol Machuca	Argentina
João Figueiredo	Brazil
Jon Irazabal	Spain
Gabriel Palmero	Spain
Hector Hevel	Netherlands

All featured in Malaysia's 4–0 win against Vietnam in the 2027 AFC Asian Cup qualifiers third round Group F match on 10 June 2025; additionally, Hector Hevel also featured in the earlier 2–0 win over Nepal in the very same qualifiers. These players were also involved in three FIFA friendly matches.

Malaysia has also claimed Nacho Méndez and Christian Abad as naturalized players of Malaysian descent. When the naturalization scandal came to light, their ancestral backgrounds were also questioned. Both have already obtained Malaysian citizenship. In fact, Abad had participated in the Malaysia national football team’s training camp, alongside Palmero and Hevel. However, neither Mendez nor Abad were caught up in the scandal, mainly because they had not yet made their debut for the Malaysian national team. This issue has also raised suspicion regarding a number of naturalization processes carried out by Malaysia in previous years, such as the naturalization of Natxo and Kiko Insa.

== FIFA actions ==
FIFA received an anonymous complaint a day after the Vietnam game, disputing the eligibility of the seven players. In August 2025, FIFA opened disciplinary proceedings against FAM. This action was not known to the general public. On 26 September, FIFA imposed a fine of CHF 350,000 (approximately RM 1.9 million) on FAM, while the seven players received individual fines of CHF 2,000 (about RM 10,560) and a 12-month suspension from football-related activities. This was when the scandal became publicly known.

FIFA released an official report on 6 October, detailing falsifications concerning the players' eligibility, including the alleged birthplaces of their grandparents. While FAM claimed that the seven players had grandparents born in Malaysia, FIFA discovered that their grandparents had in fact been born in Argentina, Brazil, Spain and the Netherlands. Additionally, FIFA expanded its investigation to determine if this was systemic amongst other naturalisations.

On 3 November, FIFA dismissed FAM's appeal, with FAM immediately announcing that it would bring the case to the Court of Arbitration for Sport. On 18 November, FIFA opened investigation involving the respective federations of Brazil, Spain, the Netherlands and Argentina. On 9 January 2026, CAS announced it would schedule the hearing. On 27 January 2026, however, CAS granted temporary suspension of FIFA ban for all seven players involved in the scheme, but noting that it does not mean the verdict has been issued; CAS will make the final decision, meaning the scandal effectively remains under investigation. The first hearing came on 27 February, but a day later CAS had delayed the announcement as they sought to collect further evidences. On 5 March, CAS dismissed FAM's appeal. FAM announced that it respects the Court's decision and admitted its own "responsibility for oversight failures", however considered the given sanctions to be "disproportionate, particularly when compared to sanctions imposed in similar cases". Following the announcement, the Asian Football Confederation announced it would conduct an investigation on FAM, under the supervision of FIFA and CAS.

=== Overturned results ===
As a result of the scandal, FIFA overturned the results of three friendlies of Malaysia (Cape Verde, Singapore and Palestine) into 0–3 defeats. Following the March 2026 case dismissal from CAS, AFC also overturned the results of the two qualification matches. This effectively eliminated Malaysia and qualified Vietnam for the 2027 tournament, disregarding the result of the final match between the two.

== EAIC investigation ==
On 10 July 2026, the Enforcement Agency Integrity Commission (EAIC), which investigates misconduct complaints against Malaysian enforcement agencies, said it had found irregularities in the approval of the seven players' citizenship. The inquiry followed a complaint against the National Registration Department (NRD). A special task force, formed under Section 17 of the Enforcement Agency Integrity Commission Act 2009, investigated the NRD and the Immigration Department, the two agencies under the Ministry of Home Affairs that process entry permits and applications for citizenship by naturalisation. It examined documents held by the ministry, the NRD, the Immigration Department, the Royal Malaysia Police and FAM, and recorded statements from fifteen officers under investigation and five members of the public.

The commission said the Federal Constitution gives the home affairs minister the power to consider applications for citizenship by naturalisation under Article 19. The minister had exercised this discretion to grant the players special approval on the basis of their potential contribution to Malaysian football. The approval was granted under Article 19(2), read together with Section 20(1)(e) of Part III of the Second Schedule, which allows the minister to count periods spent outside Malaysia as residence in the country. The task force concluded, however, that the requirements for the special approvals had been assessed "within an extremely short period and in an irregular manner". It identified four issues: irregularities in the issuance of the players' entry permits, including the interviews and security screening conducted by the Immigration Department; problems in the department's handling of security vetting and in the Malay language proficiency test administered by the NRD; the absence of confirmation from the players' home countries that they had renounced their original citizenship; and the players' failure to surrender their foreign passports to the Immigration Department.

The EAIC recommended that the NRD and the ministry review the entire naturalisation process and the documents of the seven players. It called for guidelines on the exercise of ministerial discretion that give weight to residency in Malaysia as a basis for citizenship. It also proposed standard operating procedures for citizenship approvals under Article 19(2) and for the renunciation of original citizenship. Because the constitution does not recognise dual citizenship, the commission said, the NRD should set a deadline for proof of renunciation and penalties for failure to comply. The commission further recommended guidelines on the Registrar-General's discretionary power to issue birth certificates under Section 10A of the Births and Deaths Registration Act 1957, a power it said should be used only after due diligence, and urged the Immigration Department, the NRD and the police to draw up stricter security screening procedures. It described naturalisation as a matter of national interest and security and said its report had been submitted to the ministry, the Immigration Department and the NRD for further action.

The EAIC said police reports had been lodged over the alleged forgery of the documents, which CAS had found to be falsified, and that the matter fell outside its jurisdiction and should be investigated by the relevant authorities.

== Reactions ==
Even before the fallout from the Vietnamese match, the origin of Malaysia's naturalised players had been widely speculated due to their "unusual" origin, especially when Malaysia has very limited historical and cultural ties to Latin America. Shortly before FIFA's announcement of sanctions, Facundo Garcés allegedly responded to the press that he got his Malaysian heritage from his great-grandparent, which is technically a violation of FIFA's eligibity on heritage players. He quickly denied his claims, claiming a "transcription error", before being officially identified as using forged documents in authorities' investigations.

The scandal put FAM as well as the Ministry of Home Affairs and the National Registration Department (NRD), the government agencies responsible for handling Malaysian citizenship, under scrutiny from Malaysian football fans and legislators. FAM acknowledged "technical errors" on the document submissions, but maintained that the seven players are Malaysian citizens.

Home Minister Saifuddin Nasution Ismail said that the issue was regarding the seven players' compliance under FIFA eligibility rules, rather than their citizenship, adding that birth certificates are not required for naturalisation under Malaysia's Constitution, and maintained that the players satisfied the prerequisites required to obtain citizenship, which includes "good conduct", the required residency period, and Malay language proficiency using ministerial discretion on residency requirements.

Tunku Ismail and former sports minister Khairy Jamaluddin questioned the FIFA sanctions. Tunku Ismail alleged that an external party might have influenced the world football body. Both questioned FIFA's apparent reversal since the seven players were previously cleared to play. The NRD denied involvement in the alleged falsification of documents.

=== FAM responses ===
On 17 October 2025, the Football Association of Malaysia (FAM) held a press conference to address the forged documents, which was met with criticism from Malaysian media and supporters. The association's deputy president, S. Sivasundaram, announced the immediate suspension of Secretary General Noor Azman Rahman but dodged key questions about accountability and verifications. The officials refused to elaborate on the players' background or timeline of document submissions, document verification procedures, citing the pending appeal as they considered answering those questions will interfere appeal process.

FAM also declined to identify the agents responsible for handling the players' documentation, stating instead that internal investigations were still ongoing and claimed they are not the one who handled the documentation, as they were simply received the documents from JPN. The association characterised the issue as an administrative error and maintained that the players were unaware of any wrongdoing, a position that drew scrutiny given FIFA’s subsequent findings of document falsification.

Commentators also criticised the press conference for failing to provide a clear timeline for corrective action or to assign accountability within the association. For many observers, the event symbolised the collapse of communication discipline at a time it was needed most. As one journalist who attended put it, the five officials who faced the media “clearly were not prepared”, and looked like “they hadn’t even spoken to each other before walking into the room.” On 20 December 2025, FAM stated they will lodge a police report on the alleged falsification of citizenship documents linked to seven “heritage” players under the national team.

Addressed during the press conference, FAM acting president Yusoff Mahadi said the association's executive committee had agreed to file the report in line with the recommendation made by an Independent Investigation Committee (IIC) formed to probe the matter. The IIC was formed by FAM to investigate the problem within the falsification scandal. IIC published a 58-page report open to the public stating their inability to find the players' agents, but also noted that FAM must held responsible for "serious flaws" within administrative processes.

However, FAM decided to immediately remove the IIC report from its official website shortly after it was published, stating that the move was necessary to protect the integrity of ongoing proceedings at the Court of Arbitration for Sport (CAS). Yusoff Mahadi acknowledged that the association may have misjudged the timing of the publication as it coincided with critical submission processes involving FAM's legal representatives at CAS. He provided assurance that the removal is not permanent and should not be interpreted as secrecy or reluctance to disclose information. Instead, he reiterated that the report will be reinstated after legal counsel confirms that its publication will not interfere with arbitration processes.

=== Alleged Indonesian role ===
Tunku Ismail Idris tweeted a post that accused one side that played a role in the sanctions given by FIFA and pointed out the said side was in New York to coerce Gianni Infantino to punish FAM. Tunku then followed up with a news article featuring Indonesian Minister of Youth and Sports Erick Thohir and Indonesian president Prabowo Subianto, in which Tunku indirectly accused both figures as the side who wished to sabotage FAM. Answering Tunku Ismail's claims of foul play, Erick Thohir denies such claims stating that Indonesia has nothing to do with FIFA's decision regarding to the sanctioning of FAM. Tunku Ismail's claims was also criticized by supporters of Thailand national football team because of his accusations towards Thohir akin to a declaration of war. Supporters of the Vietnam national football team also criticizes Tunku Ismail for providing uncredible data.

5 months after Tunku's accusation, Malaysian media again accused Indonesia for using Vietnam as a proxy. Their claims stated that Erick Thohir provided evidences to the Vietnam Football Federation who then formally filed a case against Malaysia to FIFA, effectively acting as a proxy on Indonesia's behalf. Neither Thohir nor Football Association of Indonesia (PSSI) has replied to the claims.

=== Speculated Vietnamese role ===
Publicly, the Vietnam Football Federation (VFF) made neutral statements regarding the issue, which were largely translations and representations from press releases with minimal to no speculations on the probability that the Vietnamese team's defeat could be overturned, while the All Nepal Football Association reportedly requested FIFA to nullify their previous 2–0 defeat to Malaysia by filing the same complaint. Vietnamese media consistently claimed that the VFF did not formally file the complaint, citing internal and anonymous sources, contradicting various Malaysian accusations that it was the Vietnamese that first complained to FIFA. FIFA Appeal Committee's November 2025 publication reported that all players also believed VFF was the party that filed the complaint against their alleged ineligibility. However, the Committee rendered the assertion to be inaccurate, referring that the complaint lodged with FIFA was not filed by the Vietnamese authority.

Vietnam's silence, unlike Nepal's active role, has been widely debated, especially in contrast to the fact that most federations in the world would often file protests if discovering irregularities, comparing to the case of Teboho Mokoena during 2026 FIFA World Cup qualification or that of Nelson Cabrera, where both rivalling federations actively filed their protests. Despite multiple denials — both informally by Vietnamese news and formally by FIFA authorities — FIFA's October 2025 notification of the grounds for sanctions against Malaysia revealed that the protest was filed within one day of Malaysia's 4–0 win against Vietnam. Adding to the confusion, Tunku Ismail claimed that he was informed by AFC about the complaint "was someone from Vietnam, but not from the federation", questioning why FIFA took a report from an "ordinary individual" that seriously.

=== Criticism of Malaysian government's priorities ===
The scandal also drew attention to the plight of stateless individuals in Malaysian states such as Sabah, as well as the complex citizenship status of foundlings born in Malaysia and children born to unmarried Malaysian mothers. Critics pointed out the opaque citizenship process in Malaysia, noting that individuals with genuine ties to the country are often denied citizenship. By contrast, citizenship was readily granted to foreigners under questionable circumstances, including this scandal. This raised concerns about the government's misplaced priorities.

=== Attack on journalists ===
Haresh Deol, the deputy president of Malaysia's National Press Club, was assaulted by two men while another filmed the incident in late December 2025. Deol was one of the first to condemn the use of forged documents and compared it to the 1MDB scandal, raising concerns over the transparency of the investigation and alleged cover-up attempts by FAM.

== See also ==
- 1994 Malaysian football scandal
- Malaysian citizenship
