= 2027 AFC Asian Cup qualification =

Tournament details
- Dates: 12 October 2023 – 4 June 2026
- Teams: 46 (Note: Saudi Arabia participated to reach the World Cup.) (from 1 confederation)

Tournament statistics
- Matches played: 205
- Goals scored: 612 (2.99 per match)
- Attendance: 2,977,767 (14,526 per match)
- Top scorer: (Yemen) Nasser Al-Gahwashi (14 goals)

The 2027 AFC Asian Cup qualification was the qualification process organized by the Asian Football Confederation (AFC) to determine the participating teams for the 2027 AFC Asian Cup, the 19th edition of the international men's football championship of Asia.

The qualification process involved a total of four rounds, where the first two rounds doubled as the 2026 FIFA World Cup qualification for Asian teams, with the final two solely for 2027 AFC Asian Cup qualification.

== Format ==
The qualification structure was as follows:

- First round: 20 teams (ranked 27–46) played home-and-away over two legs.
  - 10 winners advanced to the second round.
  - 3 best ranked losing teams advanced to the third round of Asian Cup qualification.
  - 6 worst ranked losing teams advanced to the play-off round of Asian Cup qualification. (Note: Originally this was announced to be 10 teams (9 worst ranked losing teams from the first round + Northern Mariana Islands). However, Guam withdrew and the Northern Mariana Islands were not included in the draw for the play-off round announced on 1 May 2024.)
- Second round: 36 teams (ranked 1–26 and 10 first-round winners) were divided into 9 groups of 4 teams to play home-and-away double round-robin matches.
  - The 9 group winners and 9 group runners-up qualified for the Asian Cup along with host Saudi Arabia and advanced to the third round of 2026 FIFA World Cup qualifiers.
  - The remaining 18 teams advanced to the third round of Asian Cup qualification.
- Play-off round: 6 teams (the worst ranked losing teams from the first round) played home-and-away over two legs that determined the final 3 qualifiers for the third round.
- Third round: 24 teams (3 best ranked losing team from the first round + 18 third and fourth-placed teams from the second round + 3 winners from the play-off round) were divided into 6 groups of 4 teams to play home-and-away double round-robin matches. The winner of each group occupied the remaining 6 slots for the Asian Cup.

== Entrants ==
46 FIFA-affiliated nations were eligible to enter the joint qualification process for both the 2026 FIFA World Cup and 2027 AFC Asian Cup; Northern Mariana Islands, which was not a FIFA member, would have entered through the play-off round. However, it was not included in the draw for the play-off round.

The draw for the first and second rounds of joint qualification took place on 27 July 2023. Teams were seeded into four pots. Pots 1, 2 and 3 contained the teams ranked 1–9, 10-18 and 19-26 respectively, while Pot 4 contained the remaining 20 teams (ranked 27–46). All teams from Pot 4 were drawn to the first round into two pots. Teams from Pots 1, 2 and 3 were drawn directly to the second round, along with an allocated first-round tie winner.

From the July 2023 FIFA World Rankings
Bye to second round			Competing in first round	
Pot 1	Pot 2	Pot 3	Pot 1	Pot 2
1. Japan (20); 2. Iran (22); 3. Australia (27); 4. South Korea (28); 5. Saudi Arabia (54); 6. Qatar (59); 7. Iraq (70); 8. United Arab Emirates (72); 9. Oman (73)	10. Uzbekistan (74); 11. China (80); 12. Jordan (82); 13. Bahrain (86); 14. Syria (94); 15. Vietnam (95); 16. Palestine (96); 17. Kyrgyzstan (97); 18. India (99)	19. Lebanon (100); 20. Tajikistan (110); 21. Thailand (113); 22. North Korea (115); 23. Philippines (135); 24. Malaysia (136); 25. Kuwait (137); 26. Turkmenistan (138)	27. Hong Kong (149); 28. Indonesia (150); 29. Chinese Taipei (153); 30. Maldives (155); 31. Yemen (156); 32. Afghanistan (157); 33. Singapore (158); 34. Myanmar (160); 35. Nepal (175); 36. Cambodia (176)	37. Macau (182); 38. Mongolia (183); 39. Bhutan (185); 40. Laos (187); 41. Bangladesh (189); 42. Brunei (190); 43. Timor-Leste (192); 44. Pakistan (201); 45. Guam (203); 46. Sri Lanka (204)

== Schedule ==
The schedule of the competition was as follows, according to the AFC Competitions Calendar. This was the first Asian Cup qualification to begin before the previous final matches were held, as the 2023 AFC Asian Cup was postponed to early 2024.

Round	Matchday	Date(s)
First round	First leg	12 October 2023
First round	Second leg	17 October 2023
Second round	Matchday 1	16 November 2023
Second round	Matchday 2	21 November 2023
Second round	Matchday 3	21 March 2024
Second round	Matchday 4	26 March 2024
Second round	Matchday 5	6 June 2024
Second round	Matchday 6	11 June 2024

Round	Matchday	Date
Play-off round	First leg	5–6 September 2024
Play-off round	Second leg	10 September 2024
Third round	Matchday 1	25 March 2025
Third round	Matchday 2	10 June 2025
Third round	Matchday 3	9 October 2025
Third round	Matchday 4	14 October 2025
Third round	Matchday 5	18–19 November 2025 26 March 2026 (Group E only)
Third round	Matchday 6	31 March 2026 4 June 2026 (Group B only)

== First round ==
The draw for the first round was held on 27 July 2023 at 14:00 MST (UTC+8) at the AFC House in Kuala Lumpur, Malaysia.

=== Summary ===
Team 1	Agg.	Team 2	1st leg	2nd leg
Afghanistan	2–0	Mongolia	1–0	1–0
Maldives	2–3	Bangladesh	1–1	1–2
Singapore	3–1	Guam	2–1	1–0
Yemen	4–1	Sri Lanka	3–0	1–1
Myanmar	5–1	Macau	5–1	0–0
Cambodia	0–1	Pakistan	0–0	0–1
Chinese Taipei	7–0	Timor-Leste	4–0	3–0
Indonesia	12–0	Brunei	6–0	6–0
Hong Kong	4–2	Bhutan	4–0	0–2
Nepal	2–1	Laos	1–1	1–0

=== Ranking of best losing teams ===
Pos	Team	Pld	W	D	L	GF	GA	GD	Pts	Qualification
1	Bhutan	2	1	0	1	2	4	−2	3	Asian Cup qualifying third round
2	Maldives	2	0	1	1	2	3	−1	1	Asian Cup qualifying third round
3	Laos	2	0	1	1	1	2	−1	1	Asian Cup qualifying third round
4	Cambodia	2	0	1	1	0	1	−1	1	Asian Cup qualifying play-off round
5	Sri Lanka	2	0	1	1	1	4	−3	1	Asian Cup qualifying play-off round
6	Macau	2	0	1	1	1	5	−4	1	Asian Cup qualifying play-off round
7	Guam	2	0	0	2	1	3	−2	0	Withdrew from play-off round
8	Mongolia	2	0	0	2	0	2	−2	0	Asian Cup qualifying play-off round
9	Timor-Leste	2	0	0	2	0	7	−7	0	Asian Cup qualifying play-off round
10	Brunei	2	0	0	2	0	12	−12	0	Asian Cup qualifying play-off round

Source: AFC

== Second round ==
The draw for the second round was held on 27 July 2023 at 16:00 MST (UTC+8) at the AFC House in Kuala Lumpur, Malaysia.

=== Group A ===
Pos	Team	Pld	W	D	L	GF	GA	GD	Pts	Qualification	(Qatar)	(Kuwait)	(India)	(Afghanistan)
1	Qatar	6	5	1	0	18	3	+15	16	World Cup qualifying third round and Asian Cup	—	3–0	2–1	8–1
2	Kuwait	6	2	1	3	6	6	0	7	World Cup qualifying third round and Asian Cup	1–2	—	0–1	1–0
3	India	6	1	2	3	3	7	−4	5	Asian Cup qualifying third round	0–3	0–0	—	1–2
4	Afghanistan	6	1	2	3	3	14	−11	5	Asian Cup qualifying third round	0–0	0–4	0–0	—

Source: FIFA, AFC
Rules for classification: Tiebreakers

=== Group B ===
Pos	Team	Pld	W	D	L	GF	GA	GD	Pts	Qualification	(Japan)	(North Korea)	(Syria)	(Myanmar)
1	Japan	6	6	0	0	24	0	+24	18	World Cup qualifying third round and Asian Cup	—	1–0	5–0	5–0
2	North Korea	6	3	0	3	11	7	+4	9	World Cup qualifying third round and Asian Cup	0–3 (Note: Japan were awarded a 3–0 victory by forfeit, after North Korea refused to host the match citing concerns about a disease spreading in Japan.)	—	1–0	4–1
3	Syria	6	2	1	3	9	12	−3	7	Asian Cup qualifying third round	0–5	1–0	—	7–0
4	Myanmar	6	0	1	5	3	28	−25	1	Asian Cup qualifying third round	0–5	1–6	1–1	—

Source: FIFA, AFC
Rules for classification: Tiebreakers

=== Group C ===
Pos	Team	Pld	W	D	L	GF	GA	GD	Pts	Qualification	(South Korea)	(China)	(Thailand)	(Singapore)
1	South Korea	6	5	1	0	20	1	+19	16	World Cup qualifying third round and Asian Cup	—	1–0	1–1	5–0
2	China	6	2	2	2	9	9	0	8 (Note: Head-to-head points: China 4, Thailand 1.)	World Cup qualifying third round and Asian Cup	0–3	—	1–1	4–1
3	Thailand	6	2	2	2	9	9	0	8	Asian Cup qualifying third round	0–3	1–2	—	3–1
4	Singapore	6	0	1	5	5	24	−19	1	Asian Cup qualifying third round	0–7	2–2	1–3	—

Source: FIFA, AFC
Rules for classification: Tiebreakers

=== Group D ===
Pos	Team	Pld	W	D	L	GF	GA	GD	Pts	Qualification	(Oman)	(Kyrgyzstan)	(Malaysia)	(Chinese Taipei)
1	Oman	6	4	1	1	11	2	+9	13	World Cup qualifying third round and Asian Cup	—	1–1	2–0	3–0
2	Kyrgyzstan	6	3	2	1	13	7	+6	11	World Cup qualifying third round and Asian Cup	1–0	—	1–1	5–1
3	Malaysia	6	3	1	2	9	9	0	10	Asian Cup qualifying third round	0–2	4–3	—	3–1
4	Chinese Taipei	6	0	0	6	2	17	−15	0	Asian Cup qualifying third round	0–3	0–2	0–1	—

Source: FIFA, AFC
Rules for classification: Tiebreakers

=== Group E ===
Pos	Team	Pld	W	D	L	GF	GA	GD	Pts	Qualification	(Iran)	(Uzbekistan)	(Turkmenistan)	(Hong Kong)
1	Iran	6	4	2	0	16	4	+12	14	World Cup qualifying third round and Asian Cup	—	0–0	5–0	4–0
2	Uzbekistan	6	4	2	0	13	4	+9	14	World Cup qualifying third round and Asian Cup	2–2	—	3–1	3–0
3	Turkmenistan	6	0	2	4	4	14	−10	2	Asian Cup qualifying third round	0–1	1–3	—	0–0
4	Hong Kong	6	0	2	4	4	15	−11	2	Asian Cup qualifying third round	2–4	0–2	2–2	—

Source: FIFA, AFC
Rules for classification: Tiebreakers

=== Group F ===
Pos	Team	Pld	W	D	L	GF	GA	GD	Pts	Qualification	(Iraq)	(Indonesia)	(Vietnam)	(Philippines)
1	Iraq	6	6	0	0	17	2	+15	18	World Cup qualifying third round and Asian Cup	—	5–1	3–1	1–0
2	Indonesia	6	3	1	2	8	8	0	10	World Cup qualifying third round and Asian Cup	0–2	—	1–0	2–0
3	Vietnam	6	2	0	4	6	10	−4	6	Asian Cup qualifying third round	0–1	0–3	—	3–2
4	Philippines	6	0	1	5	3	14	−11	1	Asian Cup qualifying third round	0–5	1–1	0–2	—

Source: FIFA, AFC
Rules for classification: Tiebreakers

=== Group G ===
Pos	Team	Pld	W	D	L	GF	GA	GD	Pts	Qualification	(Jordan)	(Saudi Arabia)	(Tajikistan)	(Pakistan)
1	Jordan	6	4	1	1	16	4	+12	13	World Cup qualifying third round and Asian Cup	—	0–2	3–0	7–0
2	Saudi Arabia (Note: Saudi Arabia already qualified for the Asian Cup as the host nation and only competed to qualify for the World Cup.)	6	4	1	1	12	3	+9	13	World Cup qualifying third round	1–2	—	1–0	4–0
3	Tajikistan	6	2	2	2	11	7	+4	8	Asian Cup qualifying third round	1–1	1–1	—	3–0
4	Pakistan	6	0	0	6	1	26	−25	0	Asian Cup qualifying third round	0–3	0–3	1–6	—

Source: FIFA, AFC
Rules for classification: Tiebreakers

=== Group H ===
Pos	Team	Pld	W	D	L	GF	GA	GD	Pts	Qualification	(United Arab Emirates)	(Bahrain)	(Yemen)	(Nepal)
1	United Arab Emirates	6	5	1	0	16	2	+14	16	World Cup qualifying third round and Asian Cup	—	1–1	2–1	4–0
2	Bahrain	6	3	2	1	11	3	+8	11	World Cup qualifying third round and Asian Cup	0–2	—	0–0	3–0
3	Yemen	6	1	2	3	5	9	−4	5	Asian Cup qualifying third round	0–3	0–2	—	2–2
4	Nepal	6	0	1	5	2	20	−18	1	Asian Cup qualifying third round	0–4	0–5	0–2	—

Source: FIFA, AFC
Rules for classification: Tiebreakers

=== Group I ===
Pos	Team	Pld	W	D	L	GF	GA	GD	Pts	Qualification	(Australia)	(Palestine)	(Lebanon)	(Bangladesh)
1	Australia	6	6	0	0	22	0	+22	18	World Cup qualifying third round and Asian Cup	—	5–0	2–0	7–0
2	Palestine	6	2	2	2	6	6	0	8	World Cup qualifying third round and Asian Cup	0–1	—	0–0	5–0
3	Lebanon	6	1	3	2	5	8	−3	6	Asian Cup qualifying third round	0–5	0–0	—	4–0
4	Bangladesh	6	0	1	5	1	20	−19	1	Asian Cup qualifying third round	0–2	0–1	1–1	—

Source: FIFA, AFC
Rules for classification: Tiebreakers

== Play-off round ==
Team 1	Agg.	Team 2	1st leg	2nd leg
Sri Lanka	2–2 (4–2 p)	Cambodia	0–0	2–2 (a.e.t.)
Timor-Leste	4–3	Mongolia	4–1	0–2
Brunei	4–0	Macau	3–0	1–0

== Third round ==
=== Groups ===
2027 AFC Asian Cup qualification tiebreakers
The teams were ranked according to points (3 points for a win, 1 point for a draw, 0 points for a loss). If tied on points, tiebreakers were applied in the following order (Regulations Article 7.3):
1. Points in head-to-head matches among tied teams;
2. Goal difference in head-to-head matches among tied teams;
3. Goals scored in head-to-head matches among tied teams;
4. If more than two teams were tied, and after applying criteria 1 to 3, a subset of teams were still tied, criteria 1 to 3 were reapplied exclusively to this subset of teams;
5. Goal difference in all group matches;
6. Goals scored in all group matches;
7. Penalty shoot-out if only two teams were tied and they met in the last round of the group;
8. Disciplinary points (yellow card = 1 point, red card as a result of two yellow cards = 3 points, direct red card = 3 points, yellow card followed by direct red card = 4 points);
9. Drawing of lots.

=== Group A ===
Pos	Team	Pld	W	D	L	GF	GA	GD	Pts	Qualification	(Tajikistan)	(Philippines)	(Maldives)	(Timor-Leste)
1	Tajikistan	6	4	2	0	14	3	+11	14	2027 AFC Asian Cup		1–1	2–0	1–0
2	Philippines	6	4	2	0	16	6	+10	14		2–2		4–1	3–1
3	Maldives	6	1	0	5	3	13	−10	3		0–3	0–2		2–1
4	Timor-Leste	6	1	0	5	4	15	−11	3		0–5	1–4	1–0	

Source: AFC
Legend: Blue = home team win; Yellow = draw; Red = away team win.
Rules for classification: Tiebreakers

=== Group B ===
Pos	Team	Pld	W	D	L	GF	GA	GD	Pts	Qualification	(Yemen)	(Lebanon)	(Bhutan)	(Brunei)
1	Yemen	6	4	2	0	20	1	+19	14	2027 AFC Asian Cup		0–0	7–1	9–0
2	Lebanon	6	4	1	1	14	2	+12	13		0–2		2–0	5–0
3	Bhutan	6	1	1	4	4	16	−12	4		0–0	0–4		2–1
4	Brunei	6	1	0	5	3	22	−19	3		0–2	0–3	2–1	

Source: AFC
Legend: Blue = home team win; Yellow = draw; Red = away team win.
Rules for classification: Tiebreakers

=== Group C ===
Pos	Team	Pld	W	D	L	GF	GA	GD	Pts	Qualification	(Singapore)	(Hong Kong)	(Bangladesh)	(India)
1	Singapore	6	4	2	0	8	4	+4	14	2027 AFC Asian Cup		0–0	1–0	1–1
2	Hong Kong	6	2	2	2	8	8	0	8		1–2		1–1	1–0
3	Bangladesh	6	1	2	3	6	8	−2	5		1–2	3–4		1–0
4	India	6	1	2	3	4	6	−2	5		1–2	2–1	0–0	

Source: AFC
Legend: Blue = home team win; Yellow = draw; Red = away team win.
Rules for classification: Tiebreakers

=== Group D ===
Pos	Team	Pld	W	D	L	GF	GA	GD	Pts	Qualification	(Thailand)	(Turkmenistan)	(Sri Lanka)	(Chinese Taipei)
1	Thailand	6	5	0	1	16	5	+11	15	2027 AFC Asian Cup		2–1	1–0	2–0
2	Turkmenistan	6	4	0	2	11	7	+4	12		3–1		2–1	3–1
3	Sri Lanka	6	3	0	3	8	9	−1	9		0–4	1–0		3–1
4	Chinese Taipei	6	0	0	6	5	19	−14	0		1–6	1–2	1–3	

Source: AFC
Legend: Blue = home team win; Yellow = draw; Red = away team win.
Rules for classification: Tiebreakers

=== Group E ===
Pos	Team	Pld	W	D	L	GF	GA	GD	Pts	Qualification	(Syria)	(Myanmar)	(Afghanistan)	(Pakistan)
1	Syria	6	6	0	0	21	2	+19	18	2027 AFC Asian Cup		5–1	5–1	2–0
2	Myanmar	6	4	0	2	8	11	−3	12		0–3		2–1	1–0
3	Afghanistan	6	0	2	4	4	11	−7	2		0–1	1–2		1–1
4	Pakistan	6	0	2	4	2	11	−9	2		0–5	1–2	0–0	

Source: AFC
Legend: Blue = home team win; Yellow = draw; Red = away team win.
Rules for classification: Tiebreakers

=== Group F ===
Pos	Team	Pld	W	D	L	GF	GA	GD	Pts	Qualification	(Vietnam)	(Malaysia)	(Laos)	(Nepal)
1	Vietnam	6	6	0	0	17	2	+15	18	2027 AFC Asian Cup		3–1	5–0	3–1
2	Malaysia (Note: On 26 September 2025, FIFA sanctioned the Football Association of Malaysia (FAM) and seven players for using falsified eligibility documents. These players played in the match against Nepal and Vietnam. On 5 March, CAS dismissed FAM's appeal on the falsified documents case. On 17 March 2026, the AFC overturned Malaysia's wins against Nepal (on 25 March 2025) and Vietnam (on 10 June 2025) to 0–3 defeats.)	6	3	0	3	10	10	0	9		0–3		5–1	0–3
3	Laos	6	2	0	4	4	16	−12	6		0–2	0–3		2–1
4	Nepal	6	1	0	5	5	8	−3	3		0–1	0–1	0–1	

Source: AFC
Legend: Blue = home team win; Yellow = draw; Red = away team win.
Rules for classification: Tiebreakers

== Qualified teams ==
Qualification status Qualified for Asian Cup Failed to qualify Withdrew or excluded

The following 24 teams qualified for the final tournament, including host nation Saudi Arabia.

Team	Method of qualification	Date of qualification	Finals appearances	Last appearance	Previous best performance
Saudi Arabia	Hosts	1 February 2023	12th	2023	Winners (1984, 1988, 1996)
Australia	Second round Group I winners	26 March 2024	6th	2023	Winners (2015)
Iraq	Second round Group F winners	26 March 2024	11th	2023	Winners (2007)
Iran	Second round Group E winners	26 March 2024	16th	2023	Winners (1968, 1972, 1976)
Uzbekistan	Second round Group E runners-up	26 March 2024	9th	2023	Fourth place (2011)
Qatar	Second round Group A winners	26 March 2024	12th	2023	Winners (2019, 2023)
United Arab Emirates	Second round Group H winners	26 March 2024	12th	2023	Runners-up (1996)
Japan	Second round Group B winners	2 April 2024	11th	2023	Winners (1992, 2000, 2004, 2011)
South Korea	Second round Group C winners	6 June 2024	16th	2023	Winners (1956, 1960)
Oman	Second round Group D winners	6 June 2024	6th	2023	Round of 16 (2019)
Palestine	Second round Group I runners-up	6 June 2024	4th	2023	Round of 16 (2023)
Bahrain	Second round Group H runners-up	6 June 2024	8th	2023	Fourth place (2004)
Jordan	Second round Group G winners	6 June 2024	6th	2023	Runners-up (2023)
China	Second round Group C runners-up	11 June 2024	14th	2023	Runners-up (1984, 2004)
Indonesia	Second round Group F runners-up	11 June 2024	6th	2023	Round of 16 (2023)
North Korea	Second round Group B runners-up	11 June 2024	6th	2019	Fourth place (1980)
Kuwait	Second round Group A runners-up	11 June 2024	11th	2015	Winners (1980)
Kyrgyzstan	Second round Group D runners-up	11 June 2024	3rd	2023	Round of 16 (2019)
Syria	Third round Group E winners	14 October 2025	8th	2023	Round of 16 (2023)
Singapore	Third round Group C winners	18 November 2025	2nd	1984	Group stage (1984)
Vietnam	Third round Group F winners	17 March 2026 (Note: On 26 September 2025, FIFA sanctioned the Football Association of Malaysia and seven players for using falsified eligibility documents. These players played in two qualification matches against Nepal and Vietnam. On 5 March 2026, the CAS upheld the sanctions, and the AFC overturned Malaysia's wins against Nepal (on 25 March 2025) and Vietnam (on 10 June 2025) to 0–3 defeats on 17 March 2026. The decision effectively qualified Vietnam and eliminated Malaysia, and this date represents the day that the decision was announced.)	6th	2023	Fourth place (1956, 1960) (Note: Both as South Vietnam)
Thailand	Third round Group D winners	31 March 2026	9th	2023	Third place (1972)
Tajikistan	Third round Group A winners	31 March 2026	2nd	2023	Quarter-finals (2023)
Yemen	Third round Group B winners	4 June 2026	2nd (Note: Yemen once qualified for the 1976 AFC Asian Cup as South Yemen, but according to FIFA and the AFC, the previous records of Yemen are registered as North Yemen instead.)	2019	Group stage (2019)

== Top goalscorers ==
There were 612 goals scored in 205 matches, for an average of 2.99 goals per match.

14 goals

- (Yemen national football team) Nasser Al-Gahwashi

8 goals

- (Philippines national football team) Bjørn Martin Kristensen

7 goals

- (Qatar national football team) Almoez Ali
- (South Korea national football team) Son Heung-min
- (Tajikistan national football team) Shervoni Mabatshoyev

6 goals

- (Japan national football team) Ayase Ueda
- (Syria national football team) Omar Khribin

5 goals

- (China national football team) Wu Lei
- (Iran national football team) Mehdi Taremi
- (Jordan national football team) Musa Al-Taamari

4 goals

- (Australia men's national soccer team) Kusini Yengi
- (Chinese Taipei national football team) Yu Yao-hsing
- (Indonesia national football team) Ramadhan Sananta
- (Iran national football team) Sardar Azmoun
- (Iraq national football team) Aymen Hussein
- (Jordan national football team) Ali Olwan
- (Lebanon national football team) Malek Fakhro
- (Malaysia national football team) Dion Cools
- (Malaysia national football team) Faisal Halim
- (Myanmar national football team) Than Paing
- (North Korea national football team) Jong Il-gwan
- (Saudi Arabia national football team) Saleh Al-Shehri
- (Singapore national football team) Ikhsan Fandi
- (South Korea national football team) Lee Kang-in
- (Syria national football team) Mohammad Al Hallaq
- (Thailand national football team) Suphanat Mueanta
- (Timor-Leste national football team) João Pedro

The lists below show all goal scorers for each round:

- First round
- Second round
- Play-off round
- Third round

== See also ==
- 2026 FIFA World Cup qualification (AFC)
- 2026 AFC Women's Asian Cup qualification
