= Pedro Budib =

Footballer (born 2004)

Personal information
- Full name: Pedro Budib Peniche
- Date of birth: 7 April 2004 (age 22)
- Place of birth: Puebla, Mexico
- Height: 1.92 m (6 ft 4 in)
- Position: Centre-back

Team information
- Current team: Pachuca
- Number: 32

Youth career
- 2018–2025: Puebla
- 2023–2024: → León (loan)
- 2025–: Pachuca

Senior career*
Years	Team	Apps	(Gls)
2026	Pachuca TDP	1	(0)
2026–	Pachuca	3	(0)

International career^{‡}
2025–	Lebanon	4	(2)
- * Club domestic league appearances and goals as of 21 November 2026 ‡ National team caps and goals as of 4 October 2026

Pedro Budib Peniche (Arabic: بدرو بو ديب بينيتشي; born 7 April 2004) is a professional footballer who plays as a centre-back for Liga MX club Pachuca. Born in Mexico, he plays for the Lebanon national team.

== Early life ==
Born in Puebla, Mexico, Budib is of Lebanese descent from his father's side: his paternal grandfather emigrated from Lebanon to Puebla.

== Club career ==
=== Youth ===
Born in Puebla, Mexico, Budib began his career in the youth academy of local club Puebla. He made his debut for the under-15 team in August 2018 at the age of 14. In June 2023, he was loaned to León's youth academy for one year. Upon his return to Puebla, Budib was named captain of the under-23 team at the age of 20. He had recovered from an injury suffered at the start of the Apertura 2024 tournament.

On 9 January 2025, Budib signed for Pachuca, joining their under-23 squad for the Clausura 2025 season. In May 2025, he underwent a successful Bankart repair for shoulder instability. On 3 February 2026, he made an appearance in the 2025–26 Liga TDP season for Pachuca's reserve team.

=== Pachuca ===
Budib made his senior debut for Pachuca on 11 August 2026, as an 85th-minute substitute in a 1–0 win against Charlotte in the 2026 Leagues Cup. His Liga MX debut came on 21 October 2026, playing the full 90 minutes in a 2–1 defeat to Cruz Azul.

== International career ==
Mexican at birth, Budib is of Lebanese heritage, making him eligible to represent both Mexico and Lebanon at the international level.

In March 2025, he received his first call-up to the Lebanon national team for a friendly match against Timor-Leste and a 2027 AFC Asian Cup qualifier against Brunei. Budib made his debut on 20 March 2025, coming on as a substitute against Timor-Leste; he scored a goal and provided an assist, helping Lebanon win 4–0.

== Style of play ==
Standing at 1.92 m (6 ft 4 in), Budib is known for his defensive solidity and aerial prowess. Primarily a centre-back, he is also capable of playing in other defensive positions.

== Career statistics ==
=== Club ===
As of match played 21 November 2026

Appearances and goals by club, season and competition
Club	Season	League			National cup		Other		Total	
Club	Season	Division	Apps	Goals	Apps	Goals	Apps	Goals	Apps	Goals
Pachuca TDP	2025–26	Liga TDP	1	0	—		—		1	0
Pachuca	2026–27	Liga MX	3	0	—		1 (Note: Appearance in Leagues Cup)	0	4	0
Career total			4	0	0	0	1	0	5	0

=== International ===
As of match played 4 October 2026

Appearances and goals by national team and year
National team	Year	Apps	Goals
Lebanon	2025	2	1
Lebanon	2026	2	1
Total		4	2

Scores and results list Lebanon's goal tally first, score column indicates score after each Budib goal.

List of international goals scored by Pedro Budib
No.	Date	Venue	Opponent	Score	Result	Competition
1	20 March 2025	Al-Khor SC Stadium, Al Khor, Qatar	Timor-Leste	2–0	4–0	Friendly
2	4 October 2026	Dolen Omurzakov Stadium, Bishkek, Kyrgyzstan	Kyrgyzstan	1–2	1–3	Friendly

== See also ==
- List of Lebanon international footballers born outside Lebanon
