= 2027 AFC Asian Cup qualification – play-off round =

- Nazry Aiman Azaman making a goal during the round.

Tournament details
- Dates: 5–10 September 2024
- Teams: 6 (from 1 confederation)

Tournament statistics
- Matches played: 6
- Goals scored: 15 (2.5 per match)
- Attendance: 23,972 (3,995 per match)
- Top scorer(s): (Timor-Leste) João Pedro (3 goals)

The play-off round of the 2027 AFC Asian Cup qualification was played between 5 and 10 September 2024.

== Format ==
When the play-off round was originally announced, a total of ten teams (the 2nd to 10th ranked losing teams from the first round plus the Northern Mariana Islands) would play home-and-away over two legs to determine the final five qualifiers for the third round. However, Guam withdrew and the Northern Mariana Islands were not included in the draw for the play-off round announced on 1 May 2024. This resulted in the top three losing teams (Bhutan, Maldives, and Laos) moving directly to the third round, and the remaining six teams entering the play-offs. The play-off winners joined the 21 teams which advanced directly to the third round (three best ranked losing teams from the first round and 18 teams from the second round) to compete for the final six slots in the 2027 AFC Asian Cup.

== Qualified teams ==
The teams participating in this round were decided by their ranking from the preliminary round.

- Cambodia
- Sri Lanka
- Macau
- Mongolia
- Timor-Leste
- Brunei

== Draw ==
The draw for the play-off round was held on 9 May 2024 in Kuala Lumpur, Malaysia. These six teams were divided into three pairings, with each pair playing home and away between 5 and 10 September 2024. The numbers in parentheses indicate the FIFA Men's World Ranking of April 2024. The team from Pot 2 hosted the first leg, and the team from Pot 1 hosted the second leg.

| Pot 1 | Pot 2 |
|---|---|
| Cambodia (179); Macau (186); Mongolia (191) | Brunei (194); Timor-Leste (198); Sri Lanka (204) |

== Summary ==
The three winners advanced to the third round of qualifying.

| Team 1 | Agg. | Team 2 | 1st leg | 2nd leg |
|---|---|---|---|---|
| Sri Lanka | 2–2 (4–2 p) | Cambodia | 0–0 | 2–2 (a.e.t.) |
| Timor-Leste | 4–3 | Mongolia | 4–1 | 0–2 |
| Brunei | 4–0 | Macau | 3–0 | 1–0 |

== Matches ==
5 September 2024
17:45 UTC+5:30

| Sri Lanka | 0–0 | Cambodia |
|---|---|---|
| | Report |

Colombo Racecourse, Colombo
Attendance: 2,955
Referee: Sultan Mohamed Al-Hammadi (United Arab Emirates)
10 September 2024
19:00 UTC+7

| Cambodia | 2–2 (a.e.t.) | Sri Lanka |
|---|---|---|
| Sosidan 50'; Suhana 98' | Report | Kelaart 37'; Kammerknecht 120+2' |
Penalties
| Taylor (penalty missed); Chanpolin (penalty missed); Pisoth (penalty scored); Visal (penalty scored) | 2–4 | (penalty scored) Hingert; (penalty scored) Durrant; (penalty scored) Kelaart; (penalty scored) Perera |

Olympic Stadium, Phnom Penh
Attendance: 14,178
Referee: Asker Nadjafaliyev (Uzbekistan)

2–2 on aggregate. Sri Lanka won 4–2 on penalties.

5 September 2024
15:30 UTC+8

| Timor-Leste | 4–1 | Mongolia |
|---|---|---|
| João Pedro 3', 27', 52'; Zenivio 58' | Report | Mijiddorj 34' |

Kapten I Wayan Dipta Stadium, Gianyar (Indonesia) (Note: Timor-Leste played their home game in Gianyar, due to the National Stadium in Dili failing to meet FIFA standards.)
Attendance: 108
Referee: Daniel Elder (Australia)
10 September 2024
16:00 UTC+8

| Mongolia | 2–0 | Timor-Leste |
|---|---|---|
| Törbat 8'; Dölgöön 54' | Report |

MFF Football Centre, Ulaanbaatar
Attendance: 1,569
Referee: Ahmad Alaeddin (Lebanon)

Timor-Leste won 4–3 on aggregate.

6 September 2024
21:00 UTC+8

| Brunei | 3–0 | Macau |
|---|---|---|
| Hakeme S. 32'; Nazry A. 56'; Hariz H. 61' | Report |

Hassanal Bolkiah National Stadium, Bandar Seri Begawan
Attendance: 3,794
Referee: Crystal John (India)
10 September 2024
19:30 UTC+8

| Macau | 0–1 | Brunei |
|---|---|---|
| | Report | Azwan A. R. 10' |

Centro Desportivo Olímpico - Estádio, Taipa
Attendance: 1,368
Referee: Nurzatbek Abdıkadırov (Kyrgyzstan)

Brunei won 4–0 on aggregate.

== Goalscorers ==
There were 15 goals scored in 6 matches, for an average of 2.5 goals per match.

3 goals

- (Timor-Leste national football team) João Pedro

1 goal

- (Brunei national football team) Abdul Hariz Herman
- (Brunei national football team) Azwan Ali Rahman
- (Brunei national football team) Hakeme Yazid Said
- (Brunei national football team) Nazry Aiman Azaman
- (Cambodia national football team) Nhean Sosidan
- (Cambodia national football team) Sos Suhana
- (Mongolia national football team) Dölgöön Amaraa
- (Mongolia national football team) Törbat Daginaa
- (Mongolia national football team) Oyunbaataryn Mijiddorj
- (Sri Lanka national football team) Claudio Kammerknecht
- (Sri Lanka national football team) Oliver Kelaart
- (Timor-Leste national football team) Zenivio
