= Leon Perera (footballer) =

Sri Lankan footballer (born 1997)

Personal information
- Full name: Manimeldura Leon Perera
- Date of birth: 1 January 1997 (age 29)
- Place of birth: Hamburg, Germany
- Position: Midfielder

Team information
- Current team: Lüneburger SK Hansa
- Number: 13

Youth career
- –2015: MTV Treubund Lüneburg

Senior career*
| Years | Team | Apps | (Gls) |
| 2015–2024 | MTV Treubund Lüneburg | 147 | (30) |
| 2024– | Lüneburger SK Hansa | 46 | (8) |

International career^{‡}
| 2024– | Sri Lanka | 16 | (2) |
- * Club domestic league appearances and goals as of 30 June 2026 ‡ National team caps and goals as of 9 October 2025

Manimeldura Leon Perera (born 1 January 1997) is a professional footballer who plays as a midfielder for Oberliga Niedersachsen club Lüneburger SK Hansa. Born in Germany, he plays for the Sri Lanka national team.

== Early life ==
Perera was born in Hamburg, Germany, to a Sri Lankan father and German mother.

== Club career ==
Perera came through the youth ranks of MTV Treubund Lüneburg and made his senior debut in 2015.

In June 2024, he joined Lüneburger SK Hansa.

== International career ==
In 2022, Perera was invited by the Football Federation of Sri Lanka for trials during Sri Lanka's brief training camp in Doha, Qatar. On 22 March 2024, he made his international debut for the Sri Lanka national team during a goalless draw against Papua New Guinea in the 2024 FIFA Series. On 10 September 2024, Perera converted the final penalty as Sri Lanka defeated Cambodia in tiebreakers in the 2027 AFC Asian Cup qualification – play-off round.

Perera scored his first international goal on 5 June 2025 in a friendly match against Brunei.

== Career statistics ==
=== International ===
As of 9 October 2025

Appearances and goals by national team and year
| National team | Year | Apps | Goals |
|---|---|---|---|
| Sri Lanka | 2024 | 9 | 0 |
| Sri Lanka | 2025 | 7 | 2 |
| Total | | 16 | 2 |

Scores and results list Sri Lanka's goal tally first.

List of international goals scored by Leon Perera
| No. | Date | Venue | Opponent | Score | Result | Competition |
|---|---|---|---|---|---|---|
| 1. | 5 June 2025 | Alpine Football Camp, Bangkok, Thailand | Brunei | 1–0 | 1–0 | Friendly |
| 2. | 9 October 2025 | Colombo Racecourse, Colombo, Sri Lanka | Turkmenistan | 1–0 | 1–0 | 2027 AFC Asian Cup qualification |
