= Törbat Daginaa =

Mongolian footballer

Personal information
- Date of birth: 31 July 1992 (age 34)
- Place of birth: Mongolia
- Position: Defender

Team information
- Current team: Athletic 220
- Number: 3

Senior career*
Years	Team	Apps	(Gls)
2008–2017	Khoromkhon		
2017–	Athletic 220		

International career
2015–	Mongolia	29	(2)
- * Club domestic league appearances and goals

Daginaagiin Törbat (born July 31, 1992) is a Mongolian footballer who plays as a defender for Mongolian Premier League club Athletic 220 and captains the Mongolian national team. He currently has two goals to his name for The Blue Wolves.

Making his debut just aged 16, Törbat quoted that "When I was in high school...there was no football...not even a ball." He believes that football in Mongolia is rapidly permeating into Mongolia and has the potential to be a popular sport.

== 2014 ==
Representative ambassador Deco chose Törbat and Phon Chanudom for his Star Selection to face him and four other ex-Portugal teammates in the final staged in Singapore.

== 2016 ==
Countering EAFF minnows Northern Mariana Islands, the one solitary goal he scored was a powerful header into the back of the net.

== Career statistics ==
=== International ===
As of match played 10 September 2024

Appearances and goals by national team and year
National team	Year	Apps	Goals
Mongolia	2015	1	0
Mongolia	2016	6	1
Mongolia	2017	1	0
Mongolia	2018	10	0
Mongolia	2019	7	0
Mongolia	2020	0	0
Mongolia	2021	0	0
Mongolia	2022	0	0
Mongolia	2023	1	0
Mongolia	2024	2	1
Total		28	2

Scores and results list Mongolia's goal tally first, score column indicates score after each Daginaa goal.

List of international goals scored by Törbat Daginaa
No.	Date	Venue	Opponent	Score	Result	Competition
1	4 July 2016	GFA National Training Center, Dededo, Guam	Northern Mariana Islands	4–0	8–0	2017 EAFF E-1 Football Championship
2	10 September 2024	MFF Football Centre, Ulaanbaatar, Mongolia	Timor-Leste	1–0	2–0	2027 AFC Asian Cup qualification
