= 1994 Malaysian football scandal =

Match fixing scandal

In 1994, football in Malaysia was rocked by a bribery and corruption scandal. At the time, more than 100 players and coaches suspected of fixing the Malaysia Cup and the Premier League were detained. 58 were banned for one to four years by the Football Association of Malaysia (FAM). A total of 21 players and coaches were fired, while several players were banned for life. Rahim Abdullah, who took over the squad for the 1991 SEA Games, had suspected match-fixing since the Malaysian defeat. Fans blamed the scandal as a catalyst for the downfall of Malaysian football. In 2016, the ban on 84 players was lifted by the FAM.

== See also ==
- Malaysian football naturalisation scandal
