= Rodrigo Holgado =

Argentine footballer

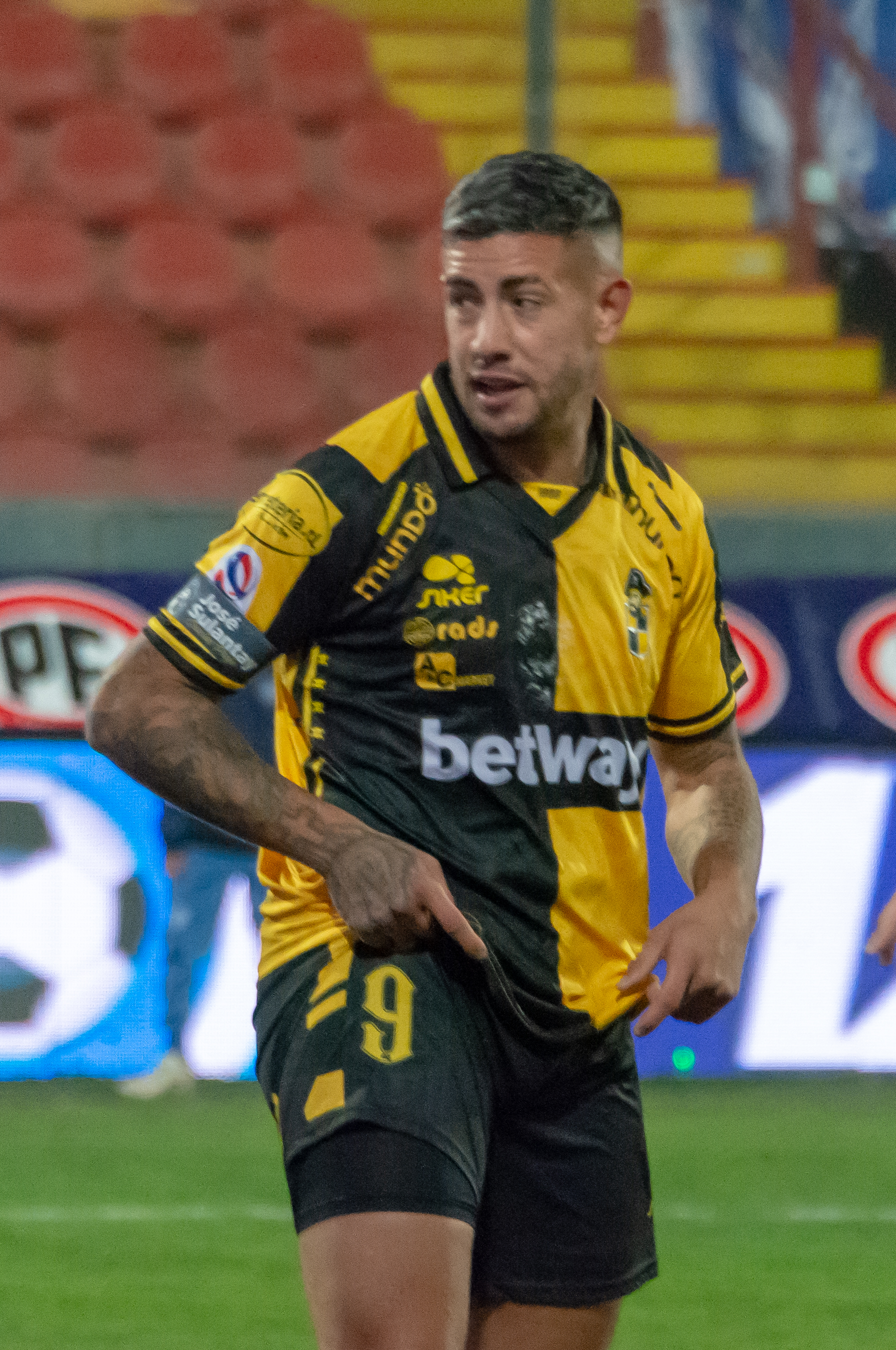
- Holgado with Coquimbo Unido in 2023

Personal information
- Full name: Rodrigo Julián Holgado
- Date of birth: 28 June 1995 (age 31)
- Place of birth: La Tablada, Argentina
- Height: 1.79 m (5 ft 10 1/2 in)
- Position: Forward

Youth career
- 2014–2015: San Lorenzo

Senior career*
Years	Team	Apps	(Gls)
2014–2016	San Lorenzo	0	(0)
2014–2015	→ Almagro (loan)	27	(2)
2016–2017	Orizaba	25	(17)
2017	Veracruz	3	(0)
2018	Coquimbo Unido	29	(18)
2019–2021	Audax Italiano	51	(16)
2021–2023	Gimnasia LP	12	(0)
2022	→ Curicó Unido (loan)	26	(8)
2023	→ Coquimbo Unido (loan)	27	(16)
2024–2026	América de Cali	58	(17)
2026	→ Coquimbo Unido (loan)	3	(0)

International career^{‡}
2025	Malaysia	2	(1)
- * Club domestic league appearances and goals as of 5 March 2026 ‡ National team caps and goals as of 10 September 2025

Rodrigo Julián Holgado (born 28 June 1995) is an Argentine professional footballer who plays as a forward. He played for the Malaysia national team twice but was later suspended from all football related activities after being sanctioned by FIFA in September 2025 for forging documents claiming his grandfather was born in Malaysia; however, Court of Arbitration for Sport (CAS) issued provisional measures on 26 January 2026 to stay, in legal terms, the sanction until a final decision is rendered. On 5 March 2026, CAS ratified 12-month ban in total since 25 September 2025, applying only to official matches and not to all football-related activities and allowing him to resume his activities with Coquimbo Unido.

== Club career ==
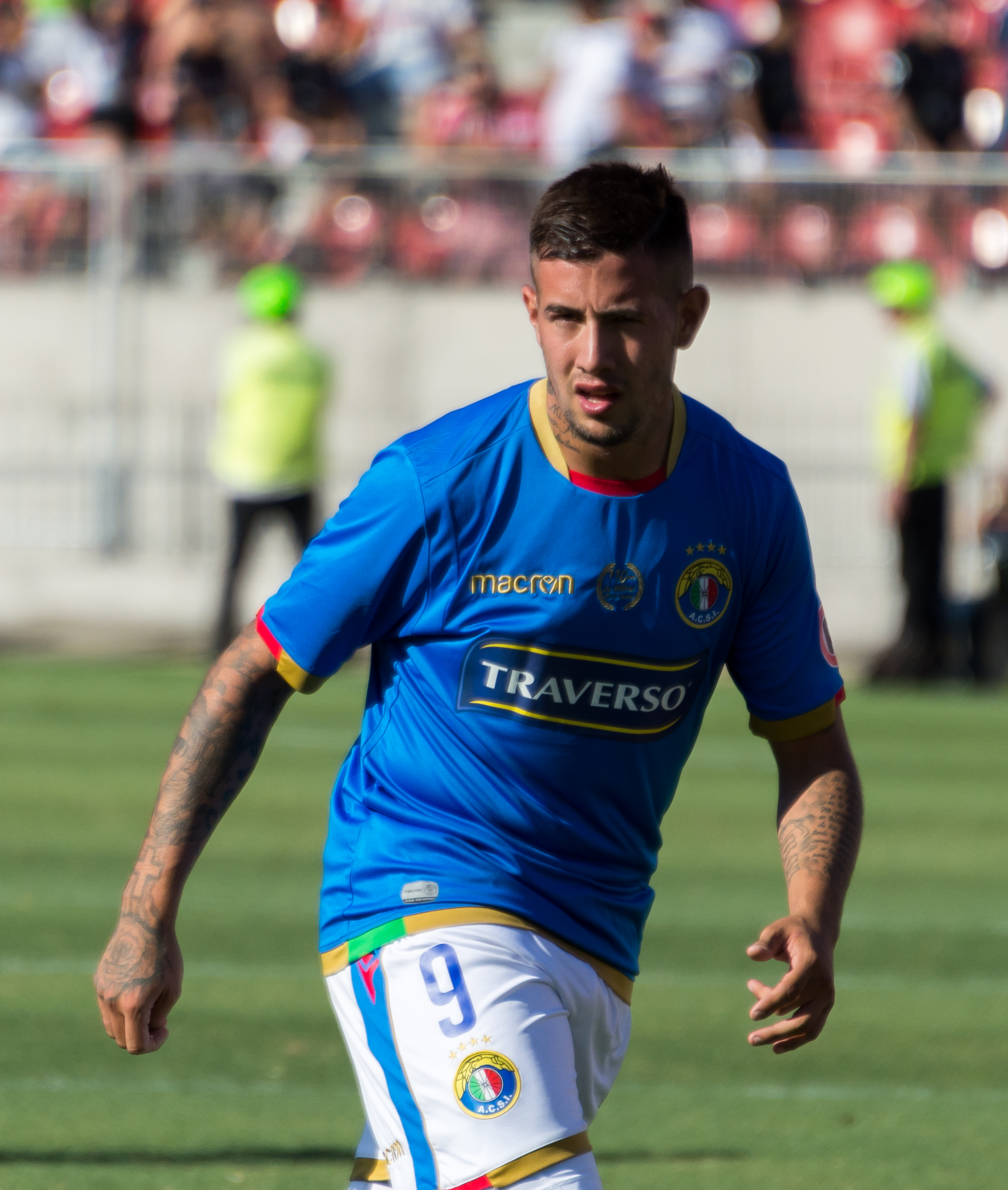
Holgado with Audax Italiano in 2020

From 2017 to 2018, Holgado played in Mexico for Albinegros de Orizaba and Veracruz.

In 2018, Holgado moved to Chile and joined Coquimbo Unido in the second level, winning the league title. In Chile, he also played for Audax Italiano and Curicó Unido before rejoining Coquimbo Unido in 2023 at the top division on loan from Argentine side Gimnasia La Plata.

In 2024, Holgado moved to Colombia and joined América de Cali. In September 2025, América suspended Holgado following his sanction by FIFA. On 26 January 2026, CAS provisionally ruled in favor of him and returned to Coquimbo Unido by third time on 8 February on loan until June of the same year. He could make 3 appearances in the 2026 Liga de Primera, before CAS ratified the 12-month ban from playing matches on 5 March, with credit for the period from 25 September 2025 until 26 January 2026 included, but it only applies to official matches and not to all football-related activities, allowing him to resume his training with Coquimbo Unido.

Back to América de Cali from Coquimbo Unido, Holgado was released in August 2026.

== International career ==
In preparation for the 2027 AFC Asian Cup qualifiers, Holgado, who claimed Malaysian heritage, was called up to the Malaysian national team on 4 June. Holgado faced criticism from Colombian sports journalist Eduardo Luis López for "abandoning his club duties" and accepting the Malaysia call-up purely based on "financial motivations". This was refuted by Holgado, who rebutted by stating that López was not qualified to comment as he was not a footballer. Colombian-born Syrian international Pablo Sabbag publicly supported Holgado's decision, emphasizing that "it is an honor to play for the national team". Holgado made his international debut on 10 June 2025 in the match against Vietnam at the Bukit Jalil National Stadium, where he also scored his first international goal.

In September 2025, however, Football Association of Malaysia (FAM), Holgado, and six other Malaysian heritage players were sanctioned by FIFA due to falsification and forgery of documents regarding the players' eligibility to play for Malaysia in the third round of the 2027 AFC Asian Cup qualifiers against Vietnam. In all seven cases, the players' Malaysian heritage was found to be false. As a result, each player was fined CHF 2,000 (around MYR 10,560) and suspended from all football related activities for 12 months. FAM have confirmed they will file an appeal against FIFA's sanctions.

== Personal life ==
Born in Argentina, Holgado claimed to be of Malaysian descent through his grandfather. However, FIFA released a statement that his grandfather was not born in nor has Malaysian ancestry, as the documentation submitted by Football Association of Malaysia was proven to be doctored.

== Career statistics ==
=== Club ===
As of match played 31 May 2025

Appearances and goals by club, season and competition
Club	Season	League			National cup (Note: Includes Copa Colombia)		Continental		Total	
Club	Season	Division	Apps	Goals	Apps	Goals	Apps	Goals	Apps	Goals
Coquimbo Unido	2018	Primera B de Chile	4	3	0	0	0	0	4	3
Audax Italiano	2019	Chilean Primera División	13	5	0	0	0	0	13	5
Audax Italiano	2020	Chilean Primera División	29	8	0	0	4 (Note: Appearances in Copa Sudamericana)	3	33	11
Audax Italiano	2021	Chilean Primera División	9	3	0	0	0	0	9	3
Audax Italiano	Total		51	16	0	0	4	3	55	19
Gimnasia y Esgrima (LP)	2021	Argentine Primera División	12	0	0	0	0	0	12	0
Curicó Unido	2022	Chilean Primera División	26	8	0	0	0	0	26	8
Coquimbo Unido	2023	Chilean Primera División	27	16	0	0	0	0	27	16
América de Cali	2024	Categoría Primera A	30	10	7	0	1	0	38	10
América de Cali	2025	Categoría Primera A	16	7	0	0	6	1	22	8
América de Cali	Total		46	17	7	0	7	1	60	18
Career total			166	60	7	0	11	4	184	64

=== International ===
As of match played 10 September 2025

Appearances and goals by national team and year
National team	Year	Apps	Goals
Malaysia	2025	2	1
Total		2	1

Scores and results list Malaysia's goal tally first, score column indicates score after each Holgado goal.

List of international goals scored by Rodrigo Holgado
No.	Date	Venue	Opponent	Score	Result	Competition
1	10 June 2025	Bukit Jalil National Stadium, Bukit Jalil, Malaysia	Vietnam	2–0	4–0	2027 AFC Asian Cup qualification

== Honours ==
Coquimbo Unido

- Primera B de Chile: 2018

Individual

- Primera B de Chile Top Goalscorer: 2018
