= Nasser Al-Gahwashi =

Yemeni footballer (born 1999)

Personal information
- Full name: Nasser Ahmed Mohammedoh Al-Gahwashi
- Date of birth: 24 May 1999 (age 27)
- Place of birth: Al-Bayda, Yemen
- Position: Central midfielder

Team information
- Current team: Zakho SC
- Number: 61

Senior career*
Years	Team	Apps	(Gls)
2020–2021	Naft Maysan	19	(8)
2021–2022	Al-Mina'a		(5)
2022–2023	Naft Al-Wasat		(4)
2023	Al-Shorta	13	(1)
2024–	Zakho SC	4	(4)

International career^{‡}
2019–	Yemen	39	(17)
- * Club domestic league appearances and goals as of 5 October 2025 ‡ National team caps and goals as of 30 September 2026 (UTC)

Nasser Ahmed Mohammedoh Al-Gahwashi (Arabic: نَاصِر أَحْمَد مُحَمَّدُوه الْغَوَاشِيّ; born 24 May 1999) also known as Nasser Al-Gahwashi, is a Yemeni professional footballer who plays as a central midfielder for Iraqi Premier League club Zakho SC and captains the Yemeni national team.

== International career ==
On 19 November 2019, Al-Gahwashi scored his first goal for Yemen at the 2022 FIFA World Cup qualification in a 1–2 defeat to Singapore.

Al-Gahwashi scored his first international hat-trick where he went on to scored five goals in one match in a 9–0 thrashing win over Brunei on 14 October 2025 during the 2027 AFC Asian Cup qualification. He then scored his second hat-trick scoring four goals in a 7–1 win to Bhutan. On 4 June 2026, he netted a brace in a 2–0 win over Lebanon, securing his nation's qualification for the 2027 AFC Asian Cup.

== International goals ==
List of international goals scored by Nasser Al-Gahwashi
No.	Date	Venue	Opponent	Score	Result	Competition
1.	19 November 2019	Al Muharraq Stadium, Muharraq, Bahrain	Singapore	1–2	1–2	2022 FIFA World Cup qualification
2.	12 October 2023	Damac Club Stadium, Khamis Mushait, Saudi Arabia	Sri Lanka	2–0	3–0	2026 FIFA World Cup qualification
3.	11 June 2024	Prince Mohamed bin Fahd Stadium, Dammam, Saudi Arabia	Nepal	1–0	2–2	2026 FIFA World Cup qualification
4.	9 October 2025	Hassanal Bolkiah National Stadium, Bandar Seri Begawan, Brunei	Brunei	2–0	2–0	2027 AFC Asian Cup qualification
5.	14 October 2025	Jaber Al-Ahmad International Stadium, Kuwait City, Kuwait	Brunei	1–0	9–0	2027 AFC Asian Cup qualification
6.	14 October 2025	Jaber Al-Ahmad International Stadium, Kuwait City, Kuwait	Brunei	2–0	9–0	2027 AFC Asian Cup qualification
7.	14 October 2025	Jaber Al-Ahmad International Stadium, Kuwait City, Kuwait	Brunei	4–0	9–0	2027 AFC Asian Cup qualification
8.	14 October 2025	Jaber Al-Ahmad International Stadium, Kuwait City, Kuwait	Brunei	5–0	9–0	2027 AFC Asian Cup qualification
9.	14 October 2025	Jaber Al-Ahmad International Stadium, Kuwait City, Kuwait	Brunei	8–0	9–0	2027 AFC Asian Cup qualification
10.	18 November 2025	Ali Sabah Al-Salem Stadium, Farwaniya, Kuwait	Bhutan	2–0	7–1	2027 AFC Asian Cup qualification
11.	18 November 2025	Ali Sabah Al-Salem Stadium, Farwaniya, Kuwait	Bhutan	3–0	7–1	2027 AFC Asian Cup qualification
12.	18 November 2025	Ali Sabah Al-Salem Stadium, Farwaniya, Kuwait	Bhutan	6–1	7–1	2027 AFC Asian Cup qualification
13.	18 November 2025	Ali Sabah Al-Salem Stadium, Farwaniya, Kuwait	Bhutan	7–1	7–1	2027 AFC Asian Cup qualification
14.	26 November 2025	Grand Hamad Stadium, Doha, Qatar	Comoros	2–1	4–4 (2–4 p)	2025 FIFA Arab Cup qualification
15.	4 June 2026	Grand Hamad Stadium, Doha, Qatar	Lebanon	1–0	2–0	2027 AFC Asian Cup qualification
16.	4 June 2026	Grand Hamad Stadium, Doha, Qatar	Lebanon	2–0	2–0	2027 AFC Asian Cup qualification
17.	30 September 2026	Prince Abdullah Al-Faisal Sports City Stadium, Jeddah, Saudi Arabia	Bahrain	1–1	5–2	27th Arabian Gulf Cup

== Honours ==
Al-Shorta

- Iraqi Premier League: 2022–23
