= 2027 AFC Asian Cup qualification – third round =

Tournament details
- Dates: 25 March 2025 – 4 June 2026
- Teams: 24 (from 1 confederation)

Tournament statistics
- Matches played: 72
- Goals scored: 215 (2.99 per match)
- Attendance: 722,935 (10,041 per match)
- Top scorer: (Yemen) Nasser Al-Gahwashi (12 goals)

The third round (Note: Referred to as the final round) of the 2027 AFC Asian Cup qualification was played from 25 March 2025 to 4 June 2026.

== Format ==
A total of 24 teams (3 best ranked losing teams from the first round + 18 third and fourth-placed teams from the second round + 3 winners from the play-off round) participated in the third round to compete for the final six slots in the 2027 AFC Asian Cup.

The 24 teams were divided into six groups of four teams to play home-and-away round-robin matches. Only the group winners of each group qualified for the 2027 AFC Asian Cup, where they joined the 18 teams which qualified directly from the second round.

== Qualified teams ==
Best-ranked losing teams from the first round:

- Bhutan
- Laos
- Maldives

Teams finishing third or fourth in their respective second round groups:

- Afghanistan
- Bangladesh
- Chinese Taipei
- Hong Kong
- India
- Lebanon
- Malaysia
- Myanmar
- Nepal
- Pakistan (Note: FIFA suspended Pakistan from all football activities on 6 February 2025 due to failing to adopt a version of the PFF constitution that had been approved by FIFA and AFC. The PFF voted to approve the constitutional changes on 27 February 2025, and the suspension was lifted on 2 March 2025.)
- Philippines
- Singapore
- Syria
- Tajikistan
- Thailand
- Turkmenistan
- Vietnam
- Yemen

Play-off round winners:

- Brunei
- Timor-Leste
- Sri Lanka

== Seeding ==
The draw was held on 9 December 2024 at the AFC House in Kuala Lumpur, Malaysia, at 15:00 (UTC+8). The teams were drawn into six groups of four teams each, with the seeding based on the November 2024 FIFA World Rankings.

The national teams which qualified are presented in bold.

FIFA Rankings as of 28 November 2024
Pot 1	Pot 2	Pot 3	Pot 4
1. **Syria** (95); 2. **Thailand** (97); 3. **Tajikistan** (104); 4. Lebanon (112); 5. **Vietnam** (116); 6. India (127)	7. Malaysia (132); 8. Turkmenistan (143); 9. Philippines (149); 10. Afghanistan (155); 11. Hong Kong (156); 12. **Yemen** (158)	13. **Singapore** (161); 14. Maldives (162); 15. Chinese Taipei (165); 16. Myanmar (167); 17. Nepal (175); 18. Bhutan (182)	19. Brunei (184); 20. Bangladesh (185); 21. Laos (186); 22. Timor-Leste (196); 23. Pakistan (198); 24. Sri Lanka (200)

== Schedule ==
The schedule of each matchday was as follows.

Matchday	Dates
Matchday 1	25 March 2025
Matchday 2	10 June 2025
Matchday 3	9 October 2025
Matchday 4	14 October 2025
Matchday 5	18–19 November 2025 26 March 2026 (Group E only)
Matchday 6	31 March 2026 4 June 2026 (Group B only)

== Rules ==
The winner of each group qualified for the final tournament, joining the 18 teams that qualified directly (including the host).

Tiebreakers

The teams were ranked according to points (3 points for a win, 1 point for a draw, 0 points for a loss). If tied on points, tiebreakers were applied in the following order (Regulations Article 7.3):

1. Points in head-to-head matches among tied teams;
2. Goal difference in head-to-head matches among tied teams;
3. Goals scored in head-to-head matches among tied teams;
4. If more than two teams were tied, and after applying criteria 1 to 3, a subset of teams were still tied, criteria 1 to 3 were reapplied exclusively to this subset of teams;
5. Goal difference in all group matches;
6. Goals scored in all group matches;
7. Penalty shoot-out if only two teams were tied and they met in the last round of the group;
8. Disciplinary points (yellow card = 1 point, red card as a result of two yellow cards = 3 points, direct red card = 3 points, yellow card followed by direct red card = 4 points);
9. Drawing of lots.

== Groups ==
=== Group A ===
Pos	Team	Pld	W	D	L	GF	GA	GD	Pts	Qualification	(Tajikistan)	(Philippines)	(Maldives)	(Timor-Leste)
1	Tajikistan	6	4	2	0	14	3	+11	**14**	2027 AFC Asian Cup		1–1	2–0	1–0
2	Philippines	6	4	2	0	16	6	+10	**14**		2–2		4–1	3–1
3	Maldives	6	1	0	5	3	13	−10	**3**		0–3	0–2		2–1
4	Timor-Leste	6	1	0	5	4	15	−11	**3**		0–5	1–4	1–0	

Source: AFC
Legend: Blue = home team win; Yellow = draw; Red = away team win.
Rules for classification: Tiebreakers
25 March 2025
16:00 UTC+5

Tajikistan	1–0	Timor-Leste
Hanonov 3'	Report; Report (AFC)

Republic Central Stadium, Dushanbe
Attendance: 8,520
Referee: Seyed Vahid Kazemi (Iran)
25 March 2025
19:00 UTC+8

Philippines	4–1	Maldives
J. Tabinas 6'; Kristensen 19'; Schneider 77'; Reyes 90+2'	Report; Report (AFC)	Fasir 62'

New Clark City Stadium, Capas
Attendance: 3,334
Referee: Daniel Elder (Australia)

10 June 2025
16:00 UTC+9:30

Timor-Leste	1–0	Maldives
Pedro 45'	Report; Report (AFC)

Territory Rugby League Stadium, Darwin (Australia) (Note: Timor-Leste played their home matches outside the country, due to a lack of an available venue that met FIFA standards.)
Attendance: 1,048
Referee: Songkran Bunmeekiart (Thailand)
10 June 2025
19:00 UTC+8

Philippines	2–2	Tajikistan
Kristensen 28', 79'	Report; Report (AFC)	Mabatshoyev 30'; Umarbayev 42' (pen.)

New Clark City Stadium, Capas
Attendance: 10,854
Referee: Hasan Akrami (Iran)

9 October 2025
19:00 UTC+9:30

Timor-Leste	1–4	Philippines
Freitas 46'	Report; Report (AFC)	Kristensen 15', 31', 49', 56'

Territory Rugby League Stadium, Darwin (Australia)
Attendance: 1,356
Referee: Yudi Nurcahya (Indonesia)
9 October 2025
18:00 UTC+5

Tajikistan	2–0	Maldives
Samiev 8'; Mabatshoyev 30'	Report; Report (AFC)

Hisor Central Stadium, Hisor
Attendance: 5,250
Referee: Zayniddin Alimov (Kyrgyzstan)

14 October 2025
19:00 UTC+8

Philippines	3–1	Timor-Leste
J. Tabinas 47'; Kristensen 70'; Gayoso 90+1'	Report; Report (AFC)	Rangel 45+1'

New Clark City Stadium, Capas
Attendance: 8,753
Referee: Torphong Somsing (Thailand)
14 October 2025
15:30 UTC+5

Maldives	0–3	Tajikistan
	Report; Report (AFC)	Safarov 4'; Mabatshoyev 34', 78'

National Football Stadium, Malé
Attendance: 3,120
Referee: Mohanad Qasim Sarray (Iraq)

18 November 2025
16:00 UTC+9:30

Timor-Leste	0–5	Tajikistan
	Report; Report (AFC)	Mabatshoyev 22', 43'; Panjshanbe 25'; Rakhimov 82'; Boboev 86'

Territory Rugby League Stadium, Darwin (Australia)
Attendance: 538
Referee: Adam Kersey (Australia)
18 November 2025
15:30 UTC+5

Maldives	0–2	Philippines
	Report; Report (AFC)	J. Tabinas 24'; Reyes 37'

National Football Stadium, Malé
Attendance: 1,591
Referee: Ahmed Khalil (Bahrain)

31 March 2026
15:30 UTC+5

Maldives	2–1	Timor-Leste
Irufaan 89'; Fasir 90+4' (pen.)	Report; Report (AFC)	Bakhito 67'

National Football Stadium, Malé
Attendance: 500
Referee: Razlan Joffri Ali (Malaysia)
31 March 2026
19:00 UTC+5

Tajikistan	1–1	Philippines
Boboev 41'	Report; Report (AFC)	Obermair 19'

Hisor Central Stadium, Hisor
Attendance: 15,200
Referee: Hiroki Kasahara (Japan)

=== Group B ===
Pos	Team	Pld	W	D	L	GF	GA	GD	Pts	Qualification	(Yemen)	(Lebanon)	(Bhutan)	(Brunei)
1	Yemen	6	4	2	0	20	1	+19	**14**	2027 AFC Asian Cup		0–0	7–1	9–0
2	Lebanon	6	4	1	1	14	2	+12	**13**		0–2		2–0	5–0
3	Bhutan	6	1	1	4	4	16	−12	**4**		0–0	0–4		2–1
4	Brunei	6	1	0	5	3	22	−19	**3**		0–2	0–3	2–1	

Source: AFC
Legend: Blue = home team win; Yellow = draw; Red = away team win.
Rules for classification: Tiebreakers
25 March 2025
18:00 UTC+6

Bhutan	0–0	Yemen
	Report; Report (AFC)

Changlimithang Stadium, Thimphu
Attendance: 4,700
Referee: Thoriq Alkatiri (Indonesia)
25 March 2025
21:30 UTC+3

Lebanon	5–0	Brunei
Fakhro 5', 28'; Merheg 21'; Chakroun 33'; Haidar 90'	Report; Report (AFC)

Saoud bin Abdulrahman Stadium, Al-Wakrah (Qatar) (Note: Lebanon were required to play all their home matches at a neutral venue due to the ongoing Hezbollah–Israel conflict.)
Attendance: 282
Referee: Venkatesh Ramachandran (India)

10 June 2025
20:15 UTC+8

Brunei	2–1	Bhutan
Nazirrudin 29'; Chetrim 63' (o.g.)	Report; Report (AFC)	Tshering 90+2'

Hassanal Bolkiah National Stadium, Bandar Seri Begawan
Attendance: 3,158
Referee: Mongkolchai Pechsri (Thailand)
10 June 2025
20:30 UTC+3

Yemen	0–0	Lebanon
	Report; Report (AFC)

Jaber Al-Mubarak Al-Hamad Stadium, Sulaibikhat (Kuwait) (Note: Yemen were required to play their home matches at a neutral venue due to the ongoing Yemeni civil war.)
Attendance: 1,512
Referee: Mahmood Al-Majarafi (Oman)

9 October 2025
16:00 UTC+8

Brunei	0–2	Yemen
	Report; Report (AFC)	Al-Matari 24'; Al-Gahwashi 36'

Hassanal Bolkiah National Stadium, Bandar Seri Begawan
Attendance: 1,529
Referee: Ngô Duy Lân (Vietnam)
9 October 2025
19:00 UTC+3

Lebanon	2–0	Bhutan
Shour 63'; Ayoub 90+4'	Report; Report (AFC)

Grand Hamad Stadium, Doha (Qatar)
Attendance: 366
Referee: Morteza Mansourian (Iran)

14 October 2025
19:00 UTC+3

Bhutan	0–4	Lebanon
	Report; Report (AFC)	Fakhro 9'; Chakroun 16'; Safwan 20'; Farran 50'

Saoud bin Abdulrahman Stadium, Al-Wakrah (Qatar) (Note: Bhutan played two home matches at neutral venues after the Changlimithang Stadium no longer met AFC standards, as artificial surfaces were disallowed in major AFC competitions from August 2025.)
Attendance: 397
Referee: Zhang Lei (China)
14 October 2025
20:00 UTC+3

Yemen	9–0	Brunei
Al-Gahwashi 12', 27', 51', 54', 73'; Al-Dahi 29', 65'; Masnom 62'; Sabara 90+1'	Report; Report (AFC)

Jaber Al-Ahmad International Stadium, Kuwait City (Kuwait)
Attendance: 755
Referee: Meder Tayçiev (Kyrgyzstan)

18 November 2025
20:15 UTC+8

Brunei	0–3	Lebanon
	Report; Report (AFC)	Fakhro 3'; Merheg 45+3'; Bugiel 59'

Hassanal Bolkiah National Stadium, Bandar Seri Begawan
Attendance: 2,667
Referee: Hasan Akrami (Iran)
18 November 2025
17:30 UTC+3

Yemen	7–1	Bhutan
Al-Zubaidi 16'; Al-Gahwashi 21', 58', 85', 89'; Qasem 76'; Al-Golan 82'	Report; Report (AFC)	Wangchuk 83'

Ali Sabah Al-Salem Stadium, Farwaniya (Kuwait)
Attendance: 350
Referee: Tam Ping Wun (Hong Kong)

31 March 2026
18:00 UTC+5:30

Bhutan	2–1	Brunei
Gyeltshen 39', 45+1'	Report; Report (AFC)	Yazid 29'

Indira Gandhi Athletic Stadium, Guwahati (India)
Attendance: 549
Referee: Venkatesh Ramachandran (India)
4 June 2026 (Note: Originally scheduled for 31 March 2026, the match was rescheduled for 4 June 2026 due to the 2026 Lebanon war.)
19:00 UTC+3

Lebanon	0–2	Yemen
	Report; Report (AFC)	Al-Gahwashi 62', 90'

Grand Hamad Stadium, Doha, (Qatar)
Attendance: 2,038
Referee: Clifford Daypuyat (Philippines)

=== Group C ===
Pos	Team	Pld	W	D	L	GF	GA	GD	Pts	Qualification	(Singapore)	(Hong Kong)	(Bangladesh)	(India)
1	Singapore	6	4	2	0	8	4	+4	**14**	2027 AFC Asian Cup		0–0	1–0	1–1
2	Hong Kong	6	2	2	2	8	8	0	**8**		1–2		1–1	1–0
3	Bangladesh	6	1	2	3	6	8	−2	**5**		1–2	3–4		1–0
4	India	6	1	2	3	4	6	−2	**5**		1–2	2–1	0–0	

Source: AFC
Legend: Blue = home team win; Yellow = draw; Red = away team win.
Rules for classification: Tiebreakers
25 March 2025
20:30 UTC+8

Singapore	0–0	Hong Kong
	Report; Report (AFC)

National Stadium, Kallang
Attendance: 8,064
Referee: Chae Sang-hyeop (South Korea)
25 March 2025
19:00 UTC+5:30

India	0–0	Bangladesh
	Report; Report (AFC)

Jawaharlal Nehru Stadium, Shillong
Attendance: 14,952
Referee: Hussein Abo Yehia (Lebanon)

10 June 2025
20:00 UTC+8

Hong Kong	1–0	India
Pereira 90+4' (pen.)	Report; Report (AFC)

Kai Tak Stadium, Kai Tak
Attendance: 42,570
Referee: Ahmad Alaeddin (Lebanon)
10 June 2025
19:00 UTC+6

Bangladesh	1–2	Singapore
Rakib 67'	Report; Report (AFC)	Song Ui-young 45'; Ikhsan 58'

National Stadium, Dhaka
Attendance: 21,317
Referee: Clifford Daypuyat (Philippines)

9 October 2025
19:30 UTC+8

Singapore	1–1	India
Ikhsan 45+1'	Report; Report (AFC)	Rahim 90'

National Stadium, Kallang
Attendance: 13,232
Referee: Shen Yinhao (China)
9 October 2025
20:00 UTC+6

Bangladesh	3–4	Hong Kong
Choudhury 13'; Morsalin 84'; Shome 90+9'	Report; Report (AFC)	Everton 45+4'; Merkies 50', 75', 90+11'

National Stadium, Dhaka
Attendance: 22,343
Referee: Saud Al-Samhan (Kuwait)

14 October 2025
20:00 UTC+8

Hong Kong	1–1	Bangladesh
Orr 36' (pen.)	Report; Report (AFC)	Rakib 84'

Kai Tak Stadium, Kai Tak
Attendance: 45,489
Referee: Hiroki Kasahara (Japan)
14 October 2025
19:30 UTC+5:30

India	1–2	Singapore
Chhangte 14'	Report; Report (AFC)	Song Ui-young 44', 58'

Pandit Jawaharlal Nehru Stadium, Margao
Attendance: 2,036
Referee: Mohamad Issa (Lebanon)

18 November 2025
20:00 UTC+8

Hong Kong	1–2	Singapore
Orr 15'	Report; Report (AFC)	Shawal 64'; Ilhan 68'

Kai Tak Stadium, Kai Tak
Attendance: 47,762
Referee: Sivakorn Pu-udom (Thailand)
18 November 2025
20:00 UTC+6

Bangladesh	1–0	India
Morsalin 11'	Report; Report (AFC)

National Stadium, Dhaka
Attendance: 23,712
Referee: Clifford Daypuyat (Philippines)

31 March 2026
20:00 UTC+8

Singapore	1–0	Bangladesh
H. Stewart 31'	Report; Report (AFC)

National Stadium, Kallang
Attendance: 30,105
Referee: Ben Abraham (Australia)
31 March 2026
19:00 UTC+5:30

India	2–1	Hong Kong
Williams 4'; Mishra 50'	Report; Report (AFC)	Camargo 65'

Jawaharlal Nehru International Stadium, Kochi
Attendance: 22,690
Referee: Songkran Bunmeekiart (Thailand)

=== Group D ===
Pos	Team	Pld	W	D	L	GF	GA	GD	Pts	Qualification	(Thailand)	(Turkmenistan)	(Sri Lanka)	(Chinese Taipei)
1	Thailand	6	5	0	1	16	5	+11	**15**	2027 AFC Asian Cup		2–1	1–0	2–0
2	Turkmenistan	6	4	0	2	11	7	+4	**12**		3–1		2–1	3–1
3	Sri Lanka	6	3	0	3	8	9	−1	**9**		0–4	1–0		3–1
4	Chinese Taipei	6	0	0	6	5	19	−14	**0**		1–6	1–2	1–3	

Source: AFC
Legend: Blue = home team win; Yellow = draw; Red = away team win.
Rules for classification: Tiebreakers
25 March 2025
18:30 UTC+8

Chinese Taipei	1–2	Turkmenistan
Kouamé 63'	Report; Report (AFC)	Tagaýew 48'; Gurbanow 83'

National Stadium, Kaohsiung
Attendance: 1,897
Referee: Abdulhadi Al-Ruaile (Qatar)
25 March 2025
19:30 UTC+7

Thailand	1–0	Sri Lanka
Gustavsson 43'	Report; Report (AFC)

Rajamangala Stadium, Bangkok
Attendance: 17,207
Referee: Zhang Lei (China)

10 June 2025
15:45 UTC+5:30

Sri Lanka	3–1	Chinese Taipei
Rajamohan 49'; De Silva 53'; Razeek 58'	Report; Report (AFC)	Huang Wei-chieh 70'

Colombo Racecourse, Colombo
Attendance: 3,710
Referee: Daniel Elder (Australia)
10 June 2025
20:00 UTC+5

Turkmenistan	3–1	Thailand
Titow 1'; Saparmämmedow 37'; Saparow 66'	Report; Report (AFC)	Supachai 35'

Ashgabat Stadium, Ashgabat
Attendance: 15,545
Referee: Ismaeel Habib Ali (Bahrain)

9 October 2025
15:45 UTC+5:30

Sri Lanka	1–0	Turkmenistan
Perera 67'	Report; Report (AFC)

Colombo Racecourse, Colombo
Attendance: 2,440
Referee: Tam Ping Wun (Hong Kong)
9 October 2025
19:30 UTC+7

Thailand	2–0	Chinese Taipei
Seksan 51'; Chanathip 78'	Report; Report (AFC)

Rajamangala Stadium, Bangkok
Attendance: 13,970
Referee: Amir Arab Baraghi (Iran)

14 October 2025
18:30 UTC+8

Chinese Taipei	1–6	Thailand
Kuo Po-wei 46'	Report; Report (AFC)	Teerasak 4', 62', 76'; Seksan 25'; Supachok 45+1'; Huang Tzu-ming 90+3' (o.g.)

Taipei Municipal Stadium, Taipei
Attendance: 4,563
Referee: Omar Al Yaqoubi (Oman)
14 October 2025
18:45 UTC+5

Turkmenistan	2–1	Sri Lanka
Tagaýew 52'; Saparow 57'	Report; Report (AFC)	Annagulyýew 65' (o.g.)

Arkadag Stadium, Arkadag
Attendance: 10,000
Referee: Asker Nadjafaliyev (Uzbekistan)

18 November 2025
15:45 UTC+5:30

Sri Lanka	0–4	Thailand
	Report; Report (AFC)	Thanawat 7'; Soonsup-Bell 65', 90'; Pansa 77'

Colombo Racecourse, Colombo
Attendance: 2,910
Referee: Sultan Mohamed Al-Hammadi (United Arab Emirates)
18 November 2025
18:45 UTC+5

Turkmenistan	3–1	Chinese Taipei
Myratberdiýew 13'; Tagaýew 53'; Diniýew 78'	Report; Report (AFC)	Kouamé 45+2'

Arkadag Stadium, Arkadag
Attendance: 10,000
Referee: Yousif Saeed Hasan (Iraq)

31 March 2026
18:30 UTC+8

Chinese Taipei	1–3	Sri Lanka
Yu Yao-hsing 55'	Report; Report (AFC)	Suresh 18'; Senthurvasan 26'; Christopher Tiao 53' (o.g.)

Taipei Municipal Stadium, Taipei
Attendance: 1,556
Referee: Jansen Foo (Singapore)
31 March 2026
19:30 UTC+7

Thailand	2–1	Turkmenistan
Suphanan 14'; Bihr 89'	Report; Report (AFC)	Çaryýew 60'

Rajamangala Stadium, Bangkok
Attendance: 37,373
Referee: Shen Yinhao (China)

=== Group E ===
Pos	Team	Pld	W	D	L	GF	GA	GD	Pts	Qualification	(Syria)	(Myanmar)	(Afghanistan)	(Pakistan)
1	Syria	6	6	0	0	21	2	+19	**18**	2027 AFC Asian Cup		5–1	5–1	2–0
2	Myanmar	6	4	0	2	8	11	−3	**12**		0–3		2–1	1–0
3	Afghanistan	6	0	2	4	4	11	−7	**2**		0–1	1–2		1–1
4	Pakistan	6	0	2	4	2	11	−9	**2**		0–5	1–2	0–0	

Source: AFC
Legend: Blue = home team win; Yellow = draw; Red = away team win.
Rules for classification: Tiebreakers
25 March 2025
17:00 UTC+6:30

Myanmar	2–1	Afghanistan
Than Paing 28'; Maung Maung Lwin 75'	Report; Report (AFC)	Popalzay 14'

Thuwunna Stadium, Yangon
Attendance: 6,500
Referee: Yahya Al-Balushi (Oman)
25 March 2025
21:00 UTC+3

Syria	2–0	Pakistan
Faqa 23'; Al Somah 56'	Report; Report (AFC)

Prince Abdullah bin Jalawi Stadium, Hofuf (Saudi Arabia) (Note: Syria played their home matches at a neutral venue due to the ongoing Syrian conflict.)
Attendance: 1,217
Referee: Sivakorn Pu-Udom (Thailand)

10 June 2025
17:00 UTC+6:30

Myanmar	1–0	Pakistan
Soe Moe Kyaw 41'	Report; Report (AFC)

Thuwunna Stadium, Yangon
Attendance: 22,000
Referee: Zhang Lei (China)
10 June 2025
20:15 UTC+3

Afghanistan	0–1	Syria
	Report; Report (AFC)	Al Somah 6'

Prince Abdullah bin Jalawi Stadium, Hofuf (Saudi Arabia) (Note: Afghanistan played their home matches at a neutral venue due to the ongoing Afghan conflict.)
Attendance: 532
Referee: Yousif Saeed Hasan (Iraq)

9 October 2025
14:00 UTC+5

Pakistan	0–0	Afghanistan
	Report; Report (AFC)

Jinnah Sports Stadium, Islamabad
Attendance: 7,375
Referee: Mohammed Al-Shammari (Qatar)
9 October 2025
19:15 UTC+3

Syria	5–1	Myanmar
Khribin 5', 19', 71' (pen.); Alsalkhadi 29'; Al Hallaq 88'	Report; Report (AFC)	Nanda Kyaw 90+1'

Prince Abdullah bin Jalawi Stadium, Hofuf (Saudi Arabia)
Attendance: 198
Referee: Mohammad Mofeed (Jordan)

14 October 2025
17:00 UTC+6:30

Myanmar	0–3	Syria
	Report; Report (AFC)	Sabbag 80', 85'; Alsalkhadi 87'

Thuwunna Stadium, Yangon
Attendance: 3,514
Referee: Tuan Yaasin Hanafiah (Malaysia)
14 October 2025
18:00 UTC+3

Afghanistan	1–1	Pakistan
Hanifi 5'	Report; Report (AFC)	Etzaz 29'

Ali Sabah Al-Salem Stadium, Farwaniya (Kuwait)
Attendance: 750
Referee: Abdullo Davlatov (Tajikistan)

18 November 2025
14:00 UTC+5

Pakistan	0–5	Syria
	Report; Report (AFC)	Al Hallaq 34', 47'; Samia 79', 90+4'; Al Dali 90'

Jinnah Sports Stadium, Islamabad
Attendance: 7,124
Referee: Virendha Rai (Bhutan)
26 March 2026 (Note: Afghanistan planned to play their home match against Myanmar in Bangladesh on 18 November 2025, but Myanmar refused to play in Bangladesh. The AFC determined to postpone the match to 26 March 2026.)
17:00 UTC+6:30

Afghanistan	1–2	Myanmar
Popalzay 10'	Report; Report (AFC)	Than Paing 45'; Khun Kyaw Zin Hein 73'

Thuwunna Stadium, Yangon (Myanmar)
Attendance: 1,760
Referee: Ngô Duy Lân (Vietnam)

31 March 2026
14:00 UTC+5

Pakistan	1–2	Myanmar
Shayak 90'	Report; Report (AFC)	Saqib 46' (o.g.); Than Paing 59'

Jinnah Sports Stadium, Islamabad
Attendance: 0 (Note: The match was held behind closed doors due to restrictions on large public gatherings by Pakistani government.)
Referee: Firdavs Nosafarov (Uzbekistan)
31 March 2026
19:15 UTC+3

Syria	5–1	Afghanistan
Al Salkhadi 5'; Al Hallaq 54'; Al Mustafa 58', 82'; Al Aswad 90+1'	Report; Report (AFC)	Panahi 23'

Prince Abdullah Al-Faisal Sports City Stadium, Jeddah (Saudi Arabia)
Attendance: 562
Referee: Nasrullo Kabirov (Tajikistan)

=== Group F ===
Pos	Team	Pld	W	D	L	GF	GA	GD	Pts	Qualification	(Vietnam)	(Malaysia)	(Laos)	(Nepal)
1	Vietnam	6	6	0	0	17	2	+15	**18**	2027 AFC Asian Cup		3–1	5–0	3–1
2	Malaysia (Note: On 26 September 2025, FIFA sanctioned the Football Association of Malaysia (FAM) and seven players for using falsified eligibility documents. These players played in the match against Nepal and Vietnam. On 5 March, CAS dismissed FAM's appeal on the falsified documents case. On 17 March 2026, the AFC overturned Malaysia's wins against Nepal (on 25 March 2025) and Vietnam (on 10 June 2025) to 0–3 defeats.)	6	3	0	3	10	10	0	**9**		0–3		5–1	0–3
3	Laos	6	2	0	4	4	16	−12	**6**		0–2	0–3		2–1
4	Nepal	6	1	0	5	5	8	−3	**3**		0–1	0–1	0–1	

Source: AFC
Legend: Blue = home team win; Yellow = draw; Red = away team win.
Rules for classification: Tiebreakers
Notes:
25 March 2025
19:30 UTC+7

Vietnam	5–0	Laos
Châu Ngọc Quang 11'; Nguyễn Văn Vĩ 44', 50'; Nguyễn Hai Long 63'; Nguyễn Quang Hải 84'	Report; Report (AFC)

Gò Đậu Stadium, Thủ Dầu Một (Note: Thủ Dầu Một was incorporated to Ho Chi Minh City in 1 July 2025.)
Attendance: 11,068
Referee: Yahya Al-Mulla (United Arab Emirates)
25 March 2025
22:00 UTC+8

Malaysia	0–3 Awarded (Note: On 26 September 2025, FIFA sanctioned the Football Association of Malaysia and seven players for using falsified eligibility documents. One player, Hector Hevel, played in the match against Nepal. On 5 March 2026, the CAS confirmed the penalties for which the AFC overturned the match as a 3–0 victory for Nepal on 17 March 2026.)	Nepal
Hevel 29'; Corbin-Ong 70'	Report; Report (AFC)

Sultan Ibrahim Stadium, Iskandar Puteri
Attendance: 7,895
Referee: Hiroki Kasahara (Japan)

10 June 2025
19:00 UTC+7

Laos	2–1	Nepal
Damoth 13'; Peter 49'	Report; Report (AFC)	Dangi 73' (pen.)

New Laos National Stadium, Vientiane
Attendance: 5,123
Referee: Nivon Robesh Gamini (Sri Lanka)
10 June 2025
21:00 UTC+8

Malaysia	0–3 Awarded (Note: On 26 September 2025, FIFA sanctioned the Football Association of Malaysia and seven players for using falsified eligibility documents. All seven players played in the match against Vietnam. On 5 March 2026, the CAS confirmed the penalties for which the AFC overturned the match as a 3–0 victory for Vietnam on 17 March 2026.)	Vietnam
Figueiredo 49'; Holgado 59'; Corbin-Ong 67'; Cools 88'	Report; Report (AFC)

Bukit Jalil National Stadium, Kuala Lumpur
Attendance: 61,512
Referee: Hussein Abo Yehia (Lebanon)

9 October 2025
19:00 UTC+7

Laos	0–3	Malaysia
	Report; Report (AFC)	Arif 53'; Cools 68'; Faisal 90+8'

New Laos National Stadium, Vientiane
Attendance: 5,289
Referee: Wiwat Jumpao-on (Thailand)
9 October 2025
19:30 UTC+7

Vietnam	3–1	Nepal
Nguyễn Tiến Linh 9'; Phạm Xuân Mạnh 67'; Nguyễn Văn Vĩ 72'	Report; Report (AFC)	Sanish 17'

Gò Đậu Stadium, Thủ Dầu Một
Attendance: 8,597
Referee: Choi Hyun-jai (South Korea)

14 October 2025
20:00 UTC+7 (Note: Match time was delayed for 30 minutes due to rain in Ho Chi Minh City.)

Nepal	0–1	Vietnam
	Report; Report (AFC)	Suman 5' (o.g.)

Thống Nhất Stadium, Ho Chi Minh City (Vietnam) (Note: Stadiums in Nepal did not meet AFC requirements, thus Nepal were required to play their home matches at a neutral venue.)
Attendance: 6,870
Referee: Mohamed Khaled (Bahrain)
14 October 2025
21:00 UTC+8

Malaysia	5–1	Laos
Faisal 59'; Morales 65', 70'; Khammanh 79' (o.g.); Josué 82'	Report; Report (AFC)	Chanthavixay 19'

Bukit Jalil National Stadium, Kuala Lumpur
Attendance: 18,901
Referee: Ahmed Eisa Darwish (United Arab Emirates)

18 November 2025
21:00 UTC+8

Nepal	0–1	Malaysia
	Report; Report (AFC)	Faisal 56'

Bukit Jalil National Stadium, Kuala Lumpur (Malaysia)
Attendance: 14,243
Referee: Kim Dae-yong (South Korea)
19 November 2025 (Note: Laos' home match against Vietnam was postponed by one day due to reasons related to organization and travel of the host team.)
19:00 UTC+7

Laos	0–2	Vietnam
	Report; Report (AFC)	Nguyễn Xuân Son 67' (pen.); Phạm Tuấn Hải 90+2'

New Laos National Stadium, Vientiane
Attendance: 16,250
Referee: Ali Reda (Lebanon)

31 March 2026
19:00 UTC+7

Vietnam	3–1	Malaysia
Đỗ Duy Mạnh 6'; Nguyễn Xuân Son 51', 59'	Report; Report (AFC)	Endrick 77' (pen.)

Thiên Trường Stadium, Ninh Bình
Attendance: 19,518
Referee: Chae Sang-hyeop (South Korea)
31 March 2026
19:00 UTC+7

Nepal	0–1	Laos
	Report; Report (AFC)	Bounphachan 48'

New Laos National Stadium, Vientiane (Laos)
Attendance: 2,327
Referee: Ahmad A'Qashah (Singapore)

== Goalscorers ==
There were 215 goals scored in 72 matches, for an average of 2.99 goals per match.

12 goals

- (Yemen national football team) Nasser Al-Gahwashi

8 goals

- (Philippines national football team) Bjørn Martin Kristensen

6 goals

- (Tajikistan national football team) Shervoni Mabatshoyev

4 goals

- (Lebanon national football team) Malek Fakhro
- (Myanmar national football team) Than Paing
- (Syria national football team) Mohammad Al Hallaq

3 goals

- (Hong Kong national football team) Raphaël Merkies
- (Malaysia national football team) Faisal Halim
- (Philippines national football team) Jefferson Tabinas
- (Singapore national football team) Ikhsan Fandi
- (Singapore national football team) Song Ui-young
- (Syria national football team) Mohammad Alsalkhadi
- (Syria national football team) Omar Khribin
- (Thailand national football team) Teerasak Poeiphimai
- (Turkmenistan national football team) Elman Tagaýew
- (Vietnam national football team) Nguyễn Văn Vĩ
- (Vietnam national football team) Nguyễn Xuân Son

2 goals

- (Afghanistan national football team) Omid Popalzay
- (Bangladesh national football team) Rakib Hossain
- (Bangladesh national football team) Shekh Morsalin
- (Bhutan national football team) Chencho Gyeltshen
- (Chinese Taipei national football team) Ange Kouamé
- (Hong Kong national football team) Everton Camargo
- (Hong Kong national football team) Matt Orr
- (Lebanon national football team) Husseyn Chakroun
- (Lebanon national football team) Samy Merheg
- (Malaysia national football team) Dion Cools
- (Malaysia national football team) La'Vere Corbin-Ong
- (Malaysia national football team) Romel Morales
- (Maldives national football team) Ali Fasir
- (Philippines national football team) Sandro Reyes
- (Syria national football team) Mohammad Al Mustafa
- (Syria national football team) Omar Al Somah
- (Syria national football team) Pablo Sabbag
- (Syria national football team) Yassin Samia
- (Tajikistan national football team) Sheriddin Boboev
- (Thailand national football team) Seksan Ratree
- (Thailand national football team) Jude Soonsup-Bell
- (Turkmenistan national football team) Mekan Saparow
- (Yemen national football team) Omar Al-Dahi

1 goal

- (Afghanistan national football team) Mahboob Hanifi
- (Afghanistan national football team) Ali Reza Panahi
- (Bangladesh national football team) Hamza Choudhury
- (Bangladesh national football team) Shamit Shome
- (Bhutan national football team) Dawa Tshering
- (Bhutan national football team) Kinga Wangchuk
- (Brunei national football team) Hakeme Yazid Said
- (Brunei national football team) Nazirrudin Ismail
- (Chinese Taipei national football team) Huang Wei-chieh
- (Chinese Taipei national football team) Kuo Po-wei
- (Chinese Taipei national football team) Yu Yao-hsing
- (Hong Kong national football team) Stefan Pereira
- (India national football team) Rahim Ali
- (India national football team) Lallianzuala Chhangte
- (India national football team) Akash Mishra
- (India national football team) Ryan Williams
- (Laos national football team) Bounphachan Bounkong
- (Laos national football team) Chanthavixay Khounthoumphone
- (Laos national football team) Peter Phanthavong
- (Laos national football team) Damoth Thongkhamsavath
- (Lebanon national football team) Jihad Ayoub
- (Lebanon national football team) Omar Bugiel
- (Lebanon national football team) Zein Farran
- (Lebanon national football team) Mohamad Haidar
- (Lebanon national football team) Mohamad Safwan
- (Lebanon national football team) Walid Shour
- (Malaysia national football team) Arif Aiman
- (Malaysia national football team) Endrick
- (Malaysia national football team) João Figueiredo
- (Malaysia national football team) Hector Hevel
- (Malaysia national football team) Rodrigo Holgado
- (Malaysia national football team) Paulo Josué
- (Maldives national football team) Mohamed Irufaan
- (Myanmar national football team) Khun Kyaw Zin Hein
- (Myanmar national football team) Maung Maung Lwin
- (Myanmar national football team) Nanda Kyaw
- (Nepal national football team) Manish Dangi
- (Nepal national football team) Sanish Shrestha
- (Pakistan national football team) Shayak Dost
- (Pakistan national football team) Etzaz Hussain
- (Philippines national football team) Jarvey Gayoso
- (Philippines national football team) Raphael Obermair
- (Philippines national football team) Randy Schneider
- (Singapore national football team) Shawal Anuar
- (Singapore national football team) Harhys Stewart
- (Sri Lanka national football team) Dillon De Silva
- (Sri Lanka national football team) Leon Perera
- (Sri Lanka national football team) Adhavan Rajamohan
- (Sri Lanka national football team) Ahmed Waseem Razeek
- (Sri Lanka national football team) Niloshan Senthurvasan
- (Sri Lanka national football team) Rahul Suresh
- (Syria national football team) Mahmoud Al Aswad
- (Syria national football team) Alaa Al Dali
- (Syria national football team) Ahmad Faqa
- (Tajikistan national football team) Vahdat Hanonov
- (Tajikistan national football team) Ehson Panjshanbe
- (Tajikistan national football team) Mukhammadzhon Rakhimov
- (Tajikistan national football team) Manuchekhr Safarov
- (Tajikistan national football team) Shahrom Samiev
- (Tajikistan national football team) Parvizdzhon Umarbayev
- (Thailand national football team) Manuel Bihr
- (Thailand national football team) Chanathip Songkrasin
- (Thailand national football team) Patrik Gustavsson
- (Thailand national football team) Pansa Hemviboon
- (Thailand national football team) Supachai Chaided
- (Thailand national football team) Supachok Sarachat
- (Thailand national football team) Suphanan Bureerat
- (Thailand national football team) Thanawat Suengchitthawon
- (Timor-Leste national football team) Alexandro Bakhito
- (Timor-Leste national football team) Gali Freitas
- (Timor-Leste national football team) João Pedro
- (Timor-Leste national football team) João Rangel
- (Turkmenistan national football team) Teýmur Çaryýew
- (Turkmenistan national football team) Meýlis Diniýew
- (Turkmenistan national football team) Ýazgylyç Gurbanow
- (Turkmenistan national football team) Rahman Myratberdiýew
- (Turkmenistan national football team) Yhlas Saparmämmedow
- (Turkmenistan national football team) Mihail Titow
- (Vietnam national football team) Châu Ngọc Quang
- (Vietnam national football team) Đỗ Duy Mạnh
- (Vietnam national football team) Nguyễn Hai Long
- (Vietnam national football team) Nguyễn Quang Hải
- (Vietnam national football team) Nguyễn Tiến Linh
- (Vietnam national football team) Phạm Tuấn Hải
- (Vietnam national football team) Phạm Xuân Mạnh
- (Yemen national football team) Omar Al-Golan
- (Yemen national football team) Abdulwasea Al-Matari
- (Yemen national football team) Harwan Al-Zubaidi
- (Yemen national football team) Abdulaziz Masnom
- (Yemen national football team) Adel Qasem
- (Yemen national football team) Abdul Sabara

1 own goal

- (Bhutan national football team) Karma Chetrim (against Brunei)
- (Chinese Taipei national football team) Christopher Tiao (against Sri Lanka)
- (Chinese Taipei national football team) Huang Tzu-ming (against Thailand)
- (Laos national football team) Khammanh Thapaseuth (against Malaysia)
- (Nepal national football team) Suman Shrestha (against Vietnam)
- (Pakistan national football team) Saqib Hanif (against Myanmar)
- (Turkmenistan national football team) Güýçmyrat Annagulyýew (against Sri Lanka)

== See also ==
- 2026 FIFA World Cup qualification – AFC third round
