= Malek Fakhro =

Footballer (born 1997)

Personal information
- Full name: Malek Issam Fakhro
- Date of birth: 14 December 1997 (age 28)
- Place of birth: Essen, Germany
- Height: 1.85 m (6 ft 1 in)
- Position: Striker

Team information
- Current team: 1. FC Bocholt
- Number: 9

Youth career
- 2004–2011: Rot-Weiss Essen
- 2011–2016: Schwarz-Weiß Essen

Senior career*
Years	Team	Apps	(Gls)
2016–2020	Schwarz-Weiß Essen	120	(34)
2020–2021	SV Straelen	27	(9)
2021–2022	VfB Lübeck	28	(8)
2021	VfB Lübeck II	1	(0)
2022–2024	1. FC Bocholt	61	(30)
2024–2025	MSV Duisburg	29	(9)
2025–2026	Hallescher FC	32	(7)
2026–	1. FC Bocholt	16	(10)

International career^{‡}
2024–	Lebanon	12	(5)
- * Club domestic league appearances and goals as of 7 November 2026 ‡ National team caps and goals as of 26 November 2025

Malek Issam Fakhro (Arabic: مالك عصام فخرو; born 14 December 1997) is a professional footballer who plays as a striker for German club 1. FC Bocholt. Born in Germany, he plays for the Lebanon national team.

== Early life ==
Fakhro's parents left Lebanon in 1985 due to the ongoing civil war. He grew up with six other siblings in the Schonnebeck district of Essen, Germany. After finishing secondary school, he started an apprenticeship in automotive mechatronics, though his primary focus remained football.

Fakhro started playing for the youth team of Rot-Weiss Essen aged six. Initially a defender, he moved up to the forward positions while playing for the under-12s. He joined Schwarz-Weiß Essen's youth setup in the under-14s, and was integrated into the senior team as an under-19 player.

== Club career ==
Following an Oberliga (fifth tier) match between SW Essen and SV Straelen in May 2020, Fakhro's performance impressed Straelen's president, prompting his signing shortly after. In his final season with SW Essen, he was named the club's "Player of the Year", having recorded 34 goals and 21 assists over five senior seasons, before departing after nine years with the team. He then joined newly promoted Regionalliga (fourth tier) side SV Straelen for the 2020–21 season, scoring nine goals in 27 appearances.

After one season at VfB Lübeck in 2021–22, in which he scored nine goals in all competitions, Fakhro joined 1. FC Bocholt in summer 2022. He scored 30 goals in his two seasons at 1. FC, and finished as second-best top scorer of the 2023–24 season with 15 goals.

On 4 June 2024, Fakhro joined MSV Duisburg alongside his former 1. FC Bocholt head coach, Dietmar Hirsch. Over the course of the season, he scored 10 goals and provided four assists in 33 appearances, including three braces against Borussia Mönchengladbach II (3–1), FC Gütersloh (3–4), and Schalke 04 II (4–0). Fakhro helped MSV Duisburg to a first-place finish in the 2024–25 Regionalliga West, which secured their promotion to the 3. Liga. He departed the club at the end of the season.

On 25 June 2025, Fakhro moved to Regionalliga club Hallescher FC. He scored eight goals in 36 appearances in all competitions. On 18 May 2026, Fakhro returned to 1. FC Bocholt.

== International career ==
Born and raised in Essen, Germany to Lebanese parents, Fakhro is eligible to represent both Germany and Lebanon internationally.

Fakhro was first called up to the Lebanon national team on 5 November 2024, for friendly games against Thailand and Myanmar. He made his debut on 14 November, playing as a starter in a 0–0 draw to Thailand. Against Myanmar on 19 November, Fakhro scored his first international goal, securing a 3–2 win for Lebanon. On 25 March 2025, Fakhro scored two goals in a 5–0 win against Brunei in the 2027 Asian Cup qualifiers.

== Style of play ==
Fakhro is a physical striker known for his strength, work rate, positioning in the penalty area, and goalscoring instinct. He is nicknamed Büffel (Buffalo).

== Career statistics ==
=== Club ===
As of match played 7 November 2026

Appearances and goals by club, season and competition
Club	Season	League			DFB-Pokal		Other		Total	
Club	Season	Division	Apps	Goals	Apps	Goals	Apps	Goals	Apps	Goals
Schwarz-Weiß Essen	2015–16	Oberliga	15	2	—		1 (Note: Appearances in Lower Rhine Cup)	0	16	2
Schwarz-Weiß Essen	2016–17	Oberliga	32	6	—		2	0	34	6
Schwarz-Weiß Essen	2017–18	Oberliga	22	5	—		2	2	24	7
Schwarz-Weiß Essen	2018–19	Oberliga	31	10	—		3	1	34	11
Schwarz-Weiß Essen	2019–20	Oberliga	20	11	—		2	1	22	12
Schwarz-Weiß Essen	Total		120	34	0	0	10	4	130	38
SV Straelen	2020–21	Regionalliga West	27	9	—		2	0	29	9
VfB Lübeck	2021–22	Regionalliga Nord	28	8	—		12 (Note: Eight appearances in championship round; four appearances, one goal in Schleswig-Holstein Cup)	1	40	9
VfB Lübeck II	2021–22	Oberliga	1	0	—		—		1	0
1. FC Bocholt	2022–23	Regionalliga West	30	15	—		4	1	34	16
1. FC Bocholt	2023–24	Regionalliga West	31	15	—		4	0	35	15
1. FC Bocholt	Total		61	30	0	0	8	1	69	31
MSV Duisburg	2024–25	Regionalliga West	29	9	—		4	1	33	10
Hallescher FC	2025–26	Regionalliga Nordost	32	7	1	0	2 (Note: Appearance in Saxony-Anhalt Cup)	0	35	7
1. FC Bocholt	2026–27	Regionalliga West	16	10	—		3	1	19	11
Career total			314	107	1	0	40	8	356	115

=== International ===
As of match played 26 November 2025

Appearances and goals by national team and year
National team	Year	Apps	Goals
Lebanon	2024	4	1
Lebanon	2025	8	4
Total		12	5

Scores and results list Lebanon's goal tally first, score column indicates score after each Fakhro goal.

List of international goals scored by Malek Fakhro
No.	Date	Venue	Opponent	Score	Result	Competition
1	19 November 2024	Thuwunna Stadium, Yangon, Myanmar	Myanmar	1–0	3–2	Friendly
2	25 March 2025	Saoud bin Abdulrahman Stadium, Al Wakrah, Qatar	Brunei	1–0	5–0	2027 Asian Cup qualification
3	25 March 2025	Saoud bin Abdulrahman Stadium, Al Wakrah, Qatar	Brunei	3–0	5–0	2027 Asian Cup qualification
4	14 October 2025	Saoud bin Abdulrahman Stadium, Al Wakrah, Qatar	Bhutan	1–0	4–0	2027 Asian Cup qualification
5	18 November 2025	Hassanal Bolkiah National Stadium, Bandar Seri Begawan, Brunei	Brunei	1–0	3–0	2027 Asian Cup qualification

== Honours ==
VfB Lübeck

- Schleswig-Holstein Cup: 2021–22

MSV Duisburg

- Regionalliga West: 2024–25

== See also ==
- List of Lebanon international footballers born outside Lebanon
