= 2025–26 Cong An Hanoi FC season =

19th season in existence of Cong An Hanoi FC

Cong An Hanoi
2025–26 season
- President: Dương Đức Hải (until 13 April 2026); Nguyễn Tiến Đạt (from 13 April 2026)
- Head coach: Alexandré Pölking
- Stadium: Hàng Đẫy
- V.League 1: Winners
- Vietnamese Cup: Round of 16
- Vietnamese Super Cup: Winners
- ASEAN Club Championship: Group stage
- AFC Champions League Two: Round of 16
- Top goalscorer: League: Alan Grafite (16); All: Alan Grafite (21)
- Highest home attendance: 16,900 (v. Thep Xanh Nam Dinh, V.League 1, 10 May 2026)
- Lowest home attendance: 2,000 (v. PVF-CAND, V.League 1, 31 October 2025)
- Average home league attendance: 10,250
- Biggest win: 6–1 v. Tampines Rovers (H); ASEAN Club Championship, 4 February 2026
- Biggest defeat: 1–3 v. Tampines Rovers (A); AFC Champions League Two, 18 February 2026
Home colours	Away colours	Third colours

The 2025–26 season was the 19th season in the history of Cong An Hanoi since their re-establishment in 2008, and the club's 4th consecutive season in the top flight of Vietnamese football. In addition to the domestic league, the club participated in this season's editions of the Vietnamese Cup, Vietnamese Super Cup, AFC Champions League Two and ASEAN Club Championship.

On 17 May 2026, Cong An Hanoi won the 2025–26 V.League 1, achieving the club's 3rd league title earlier before the season's end, during the 23rd round, winning 2–0 at home over Dong A Thanh Hoa.

== Players ==
As of 17 March 2026

Note: Flags indicate national team as defined under FIFA eligibility rules; some limited exceptions apply. Players may hold more than one non-FIFA nationality.

No.	Pos.	Nation	Player
1	GK	VIE	Nguyễn Filip
3	DF	BRA	Hugo Gomes
5	DF	VIE	Đoàn Văn Hậu
6	MF	AUS	Stefan Mauk (on loan from Adelaide United)
7	DF	VIE	Cao Pendant Quang Vinh
8	MF	BRA	Vitão
9	FW	VIE	Nguyễn Đình Bắc
10	FW	BRA	Léo Artur
11	MF	VIE	Lê Phạm Thành Long
12	MF	VIE	Hoàng Văn Toản
15	MF	VIE	Bùi Xuân Thịnh
17	DF	VIE	Vũ Văn Thanh
18	MF	VIE	Trần Đình Tiến
19	MF	VIE	Nguyễn Quang Hải (captain)
20	FW	VIE	Phan Văn Đức

No.	Pos.	Nation	Player
21	DF	VIE	Trần Đình Trọng
22	MF	VIE	Phạm Minh Phúc
23	GK	VIE	Vũ Thành Vinh
25	GK	VIE	Trần Đình Minh Hoàng
26	MF	VIE	Hà Văn Phương
27	MF	IRL	Brandon Ly
28	DF	VIE	Nguyễn Văn Đức
30	FW	BRA	Rogério Alves
32	GK	VIE	Vũ Tuyên Quang
36	DF	VIE	Hoàng Trung Anh
38	DF	FRA	Leygley Adou
55	FW	VIE	Trần Đức Nam
68	DF	VIE	Bùi Hoàng Việt Anh (vice-captain)
72	FW	BRA	Alan Grafite
88	MF	VIE	Lê Văn Đô (on loan from PVF-CAND)

=== Other players under contract ===
Note: Flags indicate national team as defined under FIFA eligibility rules; some limited exceptions apply. Players may hold more than one non-FIFA nationality.

No.	Pos.	Nation	Player
29	FW	VIE	Bùi Anh Thống
31	MF	VIE	Nguyễn Chính Đăng
60	GK	VIE	Hà Mạnh Trường

== Transfers ==
=== In ===
Date	Pos.	Player	From	Fee	Ref.
1 July 2025	DF	(Vietnam) Nguyễn Hữu Thực	(Vietnam) PVF	Loan return	
1 July 2025	DF	(Vietnam) Trương Văn Thiết	(Vietnam) Quy Nhơn Bình Định	Loan return	
1 July 2025	MF	(Vietnam) Nguyễn Chính Đăng	(Vietnam) LPBank HCMC	Loan return	
1 July 2025	FW	(Vietnam) Bùi Anh Thống	(Vietnam) LPBank HCMC	Loan return	
7 July 2025	GK	(Vietnam) Vũ Tuyên Quang	(Vietnam) Becamex Bình Dương	Free	
12 July 2025	MF	(Vietnam) Trần Đình Tiến	(Vietnam) Hồng Lĩnh Hà Tĩnh	Free	
13 July 2025	FW	(Brazil) Rogério Alves	(Vietnam) Thép Xanh Nam Định	Free	
23 July 2025	MF	(Republic of Ireland) Brandon Ly	(England) Burnley U21	Free	
25 July 2025	DF	(France) Leygley Adou	(Vietnam) Hồng Lĩnh Hà Tĩnh	Undisclosed	
31 July 2025	DF	(Vietnam) Phạm Lý Đức	(Vietnam) Hoàng Anh Gia Lai	Undisclosed	
11 August 2025	FW	(Vietnam) Trần Đức Nam	(Vietnam) PVF-CAND	Free	
11 August 2025	GK	(Vietnam) Trần Đình Minh Hoàng	(Vietnam) Ninh Bình	Free	

Total spending: ▼

=== Out ===
Date	Pos.	Player	To	Fee	Ref.
1 July 2025	GK	(Vietnam) Chu Văn Tấn	(Vietnam) Sông Lam Nghệ An	End of loan	
1 July 2025	FW	(Vietnam) Nguyễn Văn Vinh	(Vietnam) Ninh Bình	End of loan	
1 July 2025	GK	(Vietnam) Vũ Thành Vinh	(Vietnam) Hoa Bình	End of loan	
10 July 2025	GK	(Vietnam) Đỗ Sỹ Huy	(Vietnam) PVF-CAND	Free	
16 July 2025	DF	(France) Kevin Pham Ba	(Vietnam) Thép Xanh Nam Định	Loan	
21 July 2025	MF	(Vietnam) Phạm Văn Luân	(Vietnam) Công An HCMC	Loan	
25 July 2025	DF	(Vietnam) Trương Văn Thiết	(Vietnam) Bắc Ninh	Loan	
25 July 2025	FW	(Vietnam) Hồ Ngọc Thắng	(Vietnam) Bắc Ninh	Loan	
25 February 2026	DF	(Vietnam) Phạm Lý Đức	(Vietnam) PVF-CAND	Loan	
17 March 2026	DF	(Vietnam) Giáp Tuấn Dương	(Vietnam) Thep Xanh Nam Dinh	Free	

Total income: ▲

== Pre-season and friendlies ==
Win Draw Loss Fixtures

3 July 2025 Friendly	Cong An Hanoi	1–1	Libolo	Hanoi, Vietnam
--:-- UTC+7		Report	Barriero 55' (pen.)	Stadium: Hàng Đẫy Stadium

4 August 2025 Friendly	Cong An Hanoi	2–0	Hong Linh Ha Tinh	Hưng Yên, Vietnam
--:-- UTC+7	Artur; Alan	Report		Stadium: PVF Youth Football Training Center

26 August 2025 Friendly	Cong An Hanoi	2–2	Truong Tuoi Dong Nai	Hưng Yên, Vietnam
16:00 UTC+7		Report	Lê Thanh Bình; Nguyễn Quốc Lộc	Stadium: PVF Stadium

6 September 2025 Friendly	Bac Ninh	1–0	Cong An Hanoi	Bắc Ninh, Vietnam
16:00 UTC+7	Mai Xuân Quyết	Report		Stadium: Việt Yên Stadium

7 September 2025 Hybrid friendly	Vietnam	4–3	Cong An Hanoi	Hanoi, Vietnam
17:00 UTC+7	Nguyễn Tiến Linh 2'; Phạm Tuấn Hải 36'; Châu Ngọc Quang 70'; Nguyễn Văn Vĩ 86'		Trần Đức Nam 41'; Lê Văn Đô 85', 90'	Stadium: Vietnam Youth Football Training Center

14 September 2025 Friendly	PVF-CAND B	2–2	Cong An Hanoi	Hưng Yên, Vietnam
10:00 UTC+7		Report		Stadium: PVF Stadium

11 October 2025 Friendly	Cong An Hanoi	1–6	Hanoi FC	Hưng Yên, Vietnam
--:-- UTC+7		Report		Stadium: PVF Training Center

28 October 2025 Friendly	PVF-CAND B	2–2	Cong An Hanoi	Hưng Yên, Vietnam
--:-- UTC+7	Bùi Hoàng Sơn; Lê Anh Đức	Report		Stadium: PVF Youth Football Training Center

14 November 2025 Friendly	Lion City Sailors	1–2	Cong An Hanoi	Bishan, Singapore
--:-- UTC+7				Stadium: Bishan Stadium

23 January 2026 Friendly	Cong An Hanoi	2–2	Thep Xanh Nam Dinh	Hanoi, Vietnam
--:-- UTC+7	Alan; Vitão	Report (CAHN); Report (TXNĐ)	Tau	Stadium: Hàng Đẫy Stadium

24 January 2026 Friendly	Cong An Hanoi	2–1	Bac Ninh	Hanoi, Vietnam
10:00 UTC+7	Lê Văn Đô; Hoàng Văn Toản	Report	?	Stadium: PVF Stadium

== Competitions ==
=== Overall record ===
Competition	First match	Last match	Starting round	Final position	Record							
Competition	First match	Last match	Starting round	Final position	Pld	W	D	L	GF	GA	GD	Win %
V.League 1	15 August 2025	7 June 2026	Matchday 1	Winners	26	20	4	2	58	22	+36	76.92
Vietnamese Cup	23 November 2025		Round of 16	Round of 16	1	0	1	0	2	2	+0	0.00
Vietnamese Super Cup	9 August 2025		Final	Winners	1	1	0	0	3	2	+1	100.00
AFC Champions League Two	18 September 2025	18 February 2026	Group stage	Round of 16	8	2	2	4	10	13	−3	25.00
ASEAN Club Championship	20 August 2025	4 February 2026	Group stage	Group stage	5	2	1	2	9	6	+3	40.00
Total					41	25	8	8	82	45	+37	60.98

Source: Soccerway

=== V.League 1 ===
==== League table ====
Pos	Team	Pld	W	D	L	GF	GA	GD	Pts	Qualification or relegation
1	Cong An Hanoi (C)	26	20	4	2	58	22	+36	64	Qualification for the AFC Champions League Elite preliminary stage and ASEAN Club Championship group stage
2	The Cong-Viettel	26	15	9	2	39	21	+18	54	Qualification for the AFC Champions League Two group stage
3	Ninh Binh	26	15	6	5	53	31	+22	51	
4	Hanoi FC	26	14	4	8	48	30	+18	46	
5	Cong An Ho Chi Minh City	26	10	6	10	28	36	−8	36	Qualification for the ASEAN Club Championship group stage (Note: Cong An Ho Chi Minh City, the winners of the 2025–26 Vietnamese Cup, qualified for the ASEAN Club Championship group stage.)

Source: VPF
Rules for classification: 1) Points; 2) Head-to-head points; 3) Head-to-head goal difference; 4) Head-to-head goals scored; 5) Goal difference; 6) Goals scored; 7) Away goals scored; 8) Disciplinary points.
(C) Champions

==== Results summary ====
Overall								Home						Away					
Pld	W	D	L	GF	GA	GD	Pts	W	D	L	GF	GA	GD	W	D	L	GF	GA	GD
26	20	4	2	58	22	+36	64	12	1	0	35	13	+22	8	3	2	23	9	+14

Source: VPF

==== Results by round ====
Round	1	2	3	6	5	7	8	9	11	4	12	10	14	15	16	13	17	18	19	20	21	22	23	24	25	26
Ground	H	A	H	H	A	A	H	H	H	A	A	A	H	A	A	A	H	A	A	H	A	H	H	A	H	N
Result	D	W	W	W	W	D	W	W	W	W	W	W	W	L	W	W	W	D	W	W	W	W	W	D	W	L
Position	9	2	2	2	2	3	2	2	2	2	1	1	1	1	1	1	1	1	1	1	1	1	1	1	1	1

Source: VPF
A = Away; H = Home; W = Win; D = Draw; L = Loss

==== Matches ====
Win Draw Loss Fixtures

15 August 2025 1	Cong An Hanoi	1–1	The Cong-Viettel	Hanoi
19:15	Alan 22'; Vitão (yellow card) 56'	Report	Lucão 3'; Đinh Xuân Tiến (yellow card) 82'	Stadium: Hàng Đẫy Stadium; Attendance: 11,950; Referee: Hoàng Ngọc Hà

24 August 2025 2	Becamex Ho Chi Minh City	0–3	Cong An Hanoi	Ho Chi Minh City
18:00	Lê Minh Bình (yellow card) 29'; Trần Trung Hiếu (yellow card) 32' (yellow-red card) 41'	Report	Alan 3'; Nguyễn Quang Hải 62'; Artur 71'	Stadium: Bình Dương Stadium; Attendance: 5,000; Referee: Lê Vũ Linh

28 August 2025 3	Cong An Hanoi	4–2	Hanoi FC	Hanoi
19:15	Mauk (yellow card) 17'; Artur 30'; Alan 66', 72', 76' (yellow card) 76'	Report	Nguyễn Thành Chung (yellow card) 13'; Fernando (yellow card) 64'; Passira 84'; Vũ Đình Hai 90+1'	Stadium: Hàng Đẫy Stadium; Attendance: 12,000; Referee: Ngô Duy Lân

13 September 2025 6	Cong An Hanoi	2–1	Haiphong	Hanoi
19:15	Nguyễn Quang Hải 64'; Artur 70'	Report	Bùi Tiến Dụng 90+3'; Nguyễn Hữu Sơn (yellow card) 90+6'	Stadium: Hàng Đẫy Stadium; Attendance: 11,800; Referee: Mai Xuân Hùng

28 September 2025 5	Thep Xanh Nam Dinh	0–2	Cong An Hanoi	Ninh Binh
18:00	Nguyễn Văn Vĩ (yellow card) 25'; A Mít (yellow card) 28'	Report	Artur 37'; Alan 68'; Nguyễn Đình Bắc (yellow card) 76'	Stadium: Thiên Trường Stadium; Attendance: 4,500; Referee: Nguyễn Viết Duẩn

18 October 2025 7	Song Lam Nghe An	1–1	Cong An Hanoi	Nghệ An
18:00	Rentería (yellow card) 19'; Lê Nguyên Hoàng 40'; Moore (red card) 87'	Report	Nguyễn Đình Bắc (yellow card) 24'; Artur 60'	Stadium: Vinh Stadium; Attendance: 4,000; Referee: Nguyễn Mạnh Hải

27 October 2025 8	Cong An Hanoi	1–0	Cong An Ho Chi Minh City	Hanoi
19:15	Lê Văn Đô (red card) 20'; Phan Văn Đức (yellow card) 22'; Alan 35'; Trần Đình Trọng (yellow card) 87'; Hoàng Văn Toản (yellow card) 90+6'	Report	Võ Hữu Việt Hoàng (yellow card) 45'; Williams (yellow card) 47'	Stadium: Hàng Đẫy Stadium; Attendance: 9,800; Referee: Lê Vũ Linh

31 October 2025 9	Cong An Hanoi	2–0	PVF-CAND	Hanoi
19:15	Phan Văn Đức (yellow card) 10'; Phạm Minh Phúc (yellow card) 38'; Cao Pendant Quang Vinh (yellow card) 45'; Alan 76' (pen.); Gomes (yellow card) 78'; Trần Đình Tiến 90+7'	Report	Võ Anh Quân (yellow card) 45'; Nguyễn Văn Vinh (yellow card) 90+3'	Stadium: Hàng Đẫy Stadium; Attendance: 2,000; Referee: Trương Hồng Vũ

10 November 2025 11	Cong An Hanoi	3–0	Hong Linh Ha Tinh	Hanoi
19:15	Phạm Minh Phúc 25'; Adou (yellow card) 38'; China 51'; Nguyễn Quang Hải 81'	Report	Onoja (yellow card) 17'; Nguyễn Mạnh Hưng (yellow card) 77'; Nguyễn Văn Hạnh (yellow card) 79'	Stadium: Hàng Đẫy Stadium; Attendance: 5,500; Referee: Mai Xuân Hùng

18 December 2025 4	Hoang Anh Gia Lai	1–3	Cong An Hanoi	Gia Lai
17:00	Trần Thanh Sơn (yellow card) 4'; Gabriel 81' (pen.); Trần Gia Bảo (yellow card) 90+4'	Report	Artur 17'; Mauk (yellow card) 40', (goal) 42'; Phan Văn Đức 58'; Nguyễn Quang Hải (yellow card) 80'	Stadium: Pleiku Stadium; Attendance: 3,500; Referee: Nguyễn Mạnh Hải
Note: Match date originally from 21 September 2025, to provide Cong An Hanoi players can play international club competitions.

1 February 2026 12	Cong An Hanoi	3–2	Ninh Binh	Hanoi
19:15	Lê Văn Đô (yellow card) 15'; Alan 30', 35' (pen.), 45+1'; Bùi Hoàng Việt Anh (yellow card) 89'	Report	Geovane 2'; Dụng Quang Nho (yellow card) 26' (yellow-red card) 37'; Trần Thành Trung 55'	Stadium: Hàng Đẫy Stadium; Attendance: 12,800; Referee: Razlan Joffri Ali (Malaysia)

24 February 2026 10	Dong A Thanh Hoa	1–3	Cong An Hanoi	Thanh Hóa
18:00	Damoth 28'; Trần Ngọc Quý (yellow card) 64'; Đoàn Ngọc Hà (yellow card) 70'; Abdurakhmanov (yellow card) 82'; Nguyễn Bá Tiến (yellow card) 90+4'	Report	Alan 56' (pen.), 80'; Lê Văn Đô (yellow card) 62'; Đoàn Văn Hậu 66'; Cao Pendant Quang Vinh (yellow card) 82'; Mauk (yellow card) 90+1'; Vitão (yellow card) 90+5'	Stadium: Thanh Hóa Stadium; Attendance: 5,000; Referee: Ngô Duy Lân

28 February 2026 14	Cong An Hanoi	3–1	Hoang Anh Gia Lai	Hanoi
19:15	Đoàn Văn Hậu (yellow card) 49'; Phạm Minh Phúc 76'; China 82', 90+4'	Report	Marciel 40', (yellow card) 49'; Trần Thanh Sơn (yellow card) 46'; Trần Trung Kiên (yellow card) 48'; Batista (yellow card) 55'	Stadium: Hàng Đẫy Stadium; Attendance: 7,000; Referee: Nguyễn Viết Duẩn

8 March 2026 15	Hanoi FC	2–1	Cong An Hanoi	Hanoi
19:15	Đỗ Hoàng Hên 27', 74' (pen.); Nguyễn Văn Quyết (yellow card) 35'; Đỗ Duy Mạnh (yellow card) 41'; Quan Văn Chuẩn (yellow card) 63'	Report	Đoàn Văn Hậu (yellow card) 31'; Artur 90+10'	Stadium: Hàng Đẫy Stadium; Attendance: 10,500; Referee: Nazmi Bin Nasaruddin (Malaysia)

15 March 2026 16	Ninh Binh	1–2	Cong An Hanoi	Ninh Binh
18:00	Fred (yellow card) 72'; Nguyễn Hoàng Đức (yellow card) 81'; Phạm Gia Hưng 87'	Report	Alan 7'; Lê Phạm Thành Long 63'; Gomes (yellow card) 89'; Nguyễn Đình Bắc (yellow card) 90+3'	Stadium: Ninh Bình Stadium; Attendance: 14,000; Referee: Kim Woo-sung (South Korea)
Note: Match date originally on 14 March 2026. Based on reports, proposals, and unanimous opinions regarding the adjustment of the match schedule for round 16 of the 2025–26 V.League 1.

22 March 2026 13	SHB Da Nang	0–1	Cong An Hanoi	Đà Nẵng
18:00	Nguyễn Hồng Phúc (yellow card) 45+3'	Report	Artur 68' (pen.); Bùi Hoàng Việt Anh (yellow card) 90+4'; Nguyễn Filip (yellow card) 90+5'	Stadium: Chi Lăng Stadium; Attendance: 15,000; Referee: Nguyễn Viết Duẩn
Note: Match date originally on 9 February 2026. Based on the report and proposal from Cong An Hanoi FC regarding the adjustment of the match schedule for round 13 of the 2025–26 V.League 1, and the agreement of SHB Da Nang.

4 April 2026 17	Cong An Hanoi	5–1	SHB Da Nang	Hanoi
19:15	Mauk 6', 24'; Nguyễn Đình Bắc 30', 70'; Adou (yellow card) 73'; Lê Văn Đô 85'	Report	Vũ Văn Sơn 48'; Nguyễn Đức Anh (yellow card) 55'; Quế Ngọc Hải (yellow card) 82'	Stadium: Hàng Đẫy Stadium; Attendance: 11,000; Referee: Ngô Duy Lân

12 April 2026 18	PVF-CAND	1–1	Cong An Hanoi	Hưng Yên
18:00	Nguyễn Xuân Bắc 54'; Nguyễn Vũ Tín (yellow card) 58'; Samson (yellow card) 73'; Lucas (yellow card) 80'; Nguyễn Thanh Nhàn (yellow card) 84'; Phí Minh Long (yellow card) 90+4'	Report	Nguyễn Đình Bắc 12'; Đoàn Văn Hậu (yellow card) 38'; Bùi Hoàng Việt Anh (yellow card) 43'; Mauk (yellow card) 89'	Stadium: PVF Stadium; Attendance: 5,000; Referee: Nguyễn Văn Phúc

19 April 2026 19	Cong An Ho Chi Minh City	0–3	Cong An Hanoi	Ho Chi Minh City
18:00	Võ Huy Toàn (yellow card) 45+1'	Report	Lê Văn Đô 20'; Phan Văn Đức (yellow card) 37'; Mauk (yellow card) 53'; China 81', (yellow card) 81'; Nguyễn Đình Bắc 85'	Stadium: Bình Dương Stadium; Attendance: 6,000; Referee: Lê Đức Thuận
Note: Match date originally on 20 April 2026. Based on reports, proposals, and unanimous opinions regarding the adjustment of the match schedule for round 19 of the 2025–26 V.League 1.

26 April 2026 20	Cong An Hanoi	4–2	Song Lam Nghe An	Hanoi
19:15	Nguyễn Đình Bắc 19', 34', 56' (pen.); Phạm Minh Phúc 37'	Report	Olaha 45+3' (pen.), 84'	Stadium: Hàng Đẫy Stadium; Attendance: 10,500; Referee: Đỗ Khánh Nam

2 May 2026 21	Haiphong	0–2	Cong An Hanoi	Haiphong
18:00		Report	Nguyễn Đình Bắc 32'; Adou 45+2'; Hoàng Văn Toản (yellow card) 86'	Stadium: Lạch Tray Stadium; Attendance: 10,000; Referee: Ngô Duy Lân

10 May 2026 22	Cong An Hanoi	3–2	Thep Xanh Nam Dinh	Hanoi
18:00	Nguyễn Đình Bắc 6', 82' (pen.); Alan (yellow card) 18'; Mauk (yellow card) 20'; Bùi Hoàng Việt Anh 53'; China (yellow card) 90+4'	Report	Trần Ngọc Sơn 17'; Trần Văn Đạt 28'; Đặng Văn Tới (yellow card) 49'; Nguyễn Tuấn Anh (yellow card) 65'	Stadium: Hàng Đẫy Stadium; Attendance: 16,900; Referee: Nguyễn Mạnh Hải

17 May 2026 23	Cong An Hanoi	2–0	Dong A Thanh Hoa	Hanoi
19:15	Lê Phạm Thành Long (yellow card) 38'; Alan 88' (pen.); China 90+8', (yellow card) 90+8'	Report	Đoàn Ngọc Hà (yellow card) 38' (yellow-red card) 60'; Doãn Ngọc Tân (yellow card) 68'; Lê Văn Hưng (yellow card) 87'	Stadium: Hàng Đẫy Stadium; Attendance: 12,000; Referee: Ngô Duy Lân

24 May 2026 24	Hong Linh Ha Tinh	1–1	Cong An Hanoi	Hà Tĩnh
18:00	Vũ Viết Triều (yellow card) 40'; Võ Quốc Dân (yellow card) 71'; Atshimene 90+7' (pen.)	Report	Artur (yellow card) 15', (goal) 90+1' (pen.); Vitão (yellow card) 90+8'	Stadium: Hà Tĩnh Stadium; Attendance: 4,000; Referee: Lê Đức Thuận

31 May 2026 25	Cong An Hanoi	2–1	Becamex Ho Chi Minh City	Hanoi
18:00	Alan 16', (yellow card) 90+4'; Léo 46'	Report	Đoàn Tuấn Cảnh (yellow card) 45+2'; Zlatković 57'	Stadium: Hàng Đẫy Stadium; Attendance: 10,000; Referee: Nguyễn Mạnh Hải

7 June 2026 26	The Cong-Viettel	1–0	Cong An Hanoi	Ninh Bình
18:00	Phan Tuấn Tài (yellow card) 22'; Nguyễn Đức Hoàng Minh 32'; Colonna (yellow card) 74' (yellow-red card) 90+3'; Lucão (yellow card) 81'	Report	Mauk (yellow card) 52'; Nguyễn Đình Bắc (yellow card) 65'; Lê Phạm Thành Long (yellow card) 74'; Đoàn Văn Hậu (yellow card) 90+1'	Stadium: Thiên Trường Stadium; Attendance: 2,800; Referee: Tuan Mohd Yaasin (Malaysia)

=== Vietnamese Cup ===
The both qualifying round and round of 16 draw was held on 11 August 2025.

All times are local (UTC+7)

23 November 2025 Round of 16	Cong An Hanoi	2–2 (3–4 p)	The Cong-Viettel	Hanoi
19:15	Lê Văn Đô 32'; Cao Pendant Quang Vinh (yellow card) 42'; Artur (yellow card) 44'; Mauk 77'; Trần Đình Trọng (red card) 84'; China (yellow card) 86'	Report	Nguyễn Văn Tú (yellow card) 7'; Lê Quốc Nhật Nam (yellow card) 36'; Cao Pendant Quang Vinh 45' (o.g.); Wesley (yellow card) 73'; Trương Tiến Anh (yellow card) 88'; Lucão 90+4'	Stadium: Hàng Đẫy Stadium; Attendance: 12,650; Referee: Lê Vũ Linh
	Penalties
	Artur (penalty scored); Cao Pendant Quang Vinh (penalty missed); Gomes (penalty scored); Mauk (penalty missed); Lê Văn Đô (penalty scored)		Trương Tiến Anh (penalty scored); Khuất Văn Khang (penalty scored); Đinh Xuân Tiến (penalty scored); Wesley (penalty missed); Lucão (penalty scored)

=== Vietnamese Super Cup ===
9 August 2025 Final	Thép Xanh Nam Định	2–3	Công An Hà Nội	Ninh Bình
18:00	Lý Công Hoàng Anh (yellow card) 8'; Lâm Ti Phông (yellow card) 33'; Hudlin 54', 90+15' (pen.) (yellow card) 57'	Report	Alan 38'; Trần Đình Trọng (yellow card) 44'; Adou (yellow card) 60'; Artur 90+3'; Nguyễn Filip (yellow card) 90+7'; Nguyễn Đình Bắc 90+8' (yellow card) 90+9'; Gomes (yellow card) 90+13'; Lê Phạm Thành Long (yellow card) 90+16'	Stadium: Thiên Trường Stadium; Attendance: 15,000; Referee: Xuân Hùng Mai

=== AFC Champions League Two ===
==== Group stage ====
The group stage draw was held on 15 August 2025.

===== Group E table =====
Pos	Team	Pld	W	D	L	GF	GA	GD	Pts	Qualification	MAC	HNP	TPF	BJG
1	(Australia) Macarthur FC	6	4	1	1	11	6	+5	13	Advance to round of 16	—	2–1	2–1	3–0
2	(Vietnam) Công An Hà Nội	6	2	2	2	9	7	+2	8	Advance to round of 16	1–1	—	3–0	2–1
3	(Hong Kong) Tai Po	6	2	1	3	7	12	−5	7		2–1	1–0	—	3–3
4	(China) Beijing Guoan	6	1	2	3	10	12	−2	5		1–2	2–2	3–0	—

Source: ACL2
Rules for classification: Tiebreakers

Round	1	2	3	4	5	6
Ground	A	H	H	A	H	A
Result	D	W	D	L	W	L
Position	3	1	1	2	2	2

Source: AFC
A = Away; H = Home; W = Win; D = Draw; L = Loss

===== Group stage matches =====
18 September 2025 1	Beijing Guoan (China)	2–2	(Vietnam) Công An Hà Nội	Beijing, China
20:15 UTC+8	Chi Zhongguo 49'; Zhang Yuan 65'; Wu Shaocong (yellow card) 82'; Wang Ziming (yellow card) 86'	Report	Vitão 15'; China 73'; Cao Pendant Quang Vinh (yellow card) 82'; Mauk (yellow card) 86'	Stadium: Workers' Stadium; Attendance: 20,071; Referee: Wiwat Jumpaoon (Thailand)

2 October 2025 2	Công An Hà Nội (Vietnam)	3–0	(Hong Kong) Tai Po	Hanoi, Vietnam
19:15 UTC+7	Trần Đình Trọng (yellow card) 9'; China 27', 33', (yellow card) 44'; Phan Văn Đức 89'; Phạm Minh Phúc (yellow card) 90+3'	Report	Mikael (yellow card) 3'	Stadium: Hàng Đẫy Stadium; Attendance: 5,179; Referee: Mohamed Khaled (Bahrain)

23 October 2025 3	Công An Hà Nội (Vietnam)	1–1	(Australia) Macarthur	Hanoi, Vietnam
19:15 UTC+7	Lê Văn Đô 30', (yellow card) 90'; Nguyễn Quang Hải (yellow card) 36'	Report	Talbot (yellow card) 57'; Uskok 76'; Cáceres (yellow card) 90'	Stadium: Hàng Đẫy Stadium; Attendance: 4,169; Referee: Hanna Hattab (Syria)

6 November 2025 4	Macarthur (Australia)	2–1	(Vietnam) Công An Hà Nội	Sydney, Australia
18:45 UTC+11	Gržan 20'; Uskok (yellow card) 39'; Brattan (yellow card) 60'; Cáceres 75'; Rose (yellow card) 78'	Report	Adou 30'; Gomes (yellow card) 52'; Mauk (yellow card) 78'; Artur (yellow card) 82'	Stadium: Campbelltown Sports Stadium; Attendance: 2,889; Referee: Clifford Daypuyat (Philippines)

27 November 2025 5	Công An Hà Nội (Vietnam)	2–1	(China) Beijing Guoan	Hanoi, Vietnam
19:15 UTC+7	Adou (yellow card) 17'; Mauk 76'; Nguyễn Đình Bắc 90', (yellow card) 90+1'; China (yellow card) 90+4'	Report	Lin Liangming 11'; Cao Yongjing (yellow card) 66' (red card) 90+3'; Wang Gang (yellow card) 90+4'	Stadium: Hàng Đẫy Stadium; Attendance: 4,739; Referee: Ahmed Khalil (Bahrain)

11 December 2025 6	Tai Po (Hong Kong)	1–0	(Vietnam) Công An Hà Nội	Kowloon, Hong Kong
20:15 UTC+8	Temelkovski 13' (pen.), (yellow card) 45+4'; Mikael (yellow card) 38'; Chan Siu Kwan (yellow card) 45+1'; Weverton (yellow card) 70'; Tse Ka Wing (yellow card) 81'; Patrick (yellow card) 85'	Report	Adou (yellow card) 11'; China (yellow card) 26'; Mauk (yellow card) 45+1'	Stadium: Mong Kok Stadium; Attendance: 2,544; Referee: Hanna Hattab (Syria)

==== Knockout stage ====
===== Round of 16 =====
The draw for the round of 16 was held on 30 December 2025.

11 February 2026 First leg	Công An Hà Nội (Vietnam)	0–3; Awarded (Note: Tampines Rovers were awarded a 0–3 victory by forfeit, after Công An Hà Nội fielded two ineligible players, Stefan Mauk and Rogério Alves. The score on the field was originally a 4–0 win by Công An Hà Nội.)	(Singapore) Tampines Rovers	Hanoi, Vietnam
19:15 UTC+7	Nguyễn Quang Hải 24', 27'; China 37'; Nguyễn Filip (yellow card) 90'; Nguyễn Đình Bắc 90+2'	Report	Yamashita (yellow card) 86'	Stadium: Hàng Đẫy Stadium; Attendance: 3,186; Referee: Zaid Thamer Mohammed (Iraq)

18 February 2026 Second leg	Tampines Rovers (Singapore)	3–1 (6–1 agg.)	(Vietnam) Công An Hà Nội	Bishan, Singapore
20:15 UTC+8	Higashikawa 36', 60'; Kazama (yellow card) 45+4'; Yoshimoto (yellow card) 45+4'; Kobayashi (yellow card) 70'; Buhagiar 79'	Report	Alan (yellow card) 35', (goal) 77' (pen.); Artur (red card) 55'; Lê Văn Đô (yellow card) 90+7'	Stadium: Bishan Stadium; Attendance: 1,786; Referee: Kim Yu-jeong (South Korea)

=== ASEAN Club Championship ===
==== Group A table ====
The group stage draw was held on 4 July 2025.

Pos	Team	Pld	W	D	L	GF	GA	GD	Pts	Qualification	BRU	SEL	BGP	CAH	BGT	DHC
1	(Thailand) Buriram United	5	2	3	0	14	5	+9	9	Advance to knockout stage	—	1–1	—	1–1	—	6–0
2	(Malaysia) Selangor	5	2	3	0	9	5	+4	9	Advance to knockout stage	—	—	1–1	2–0	4–2	—
3	(Thailand) BG Pathum United	5	2	2	1	9	7	+2	8		2–2	—	—	2–1	—	2–0
4	(Vietnam) Công An Hà Nội	5	2	1	2	9	6	+3	7		—	—	—	—	6–1	1–0
5	(Singapore) Tampines Rovers	5	2	0	3	10	17	−7	6		1–4	—	3–2	—	—	—
6	(Philippines) Dynamic Herb Cebu	5	0	1	4	2	13	−11	1		—	1–1	—	—	1–3	—

Source: ASEAN United FC
Rules for classification: Tiebreakers

Round	1	2	3	4	5
Ground	A	H	A	A	H
Result	L	W	D	L	W
Position	5	4	4	5	4

Source: ASEAN United FC
A = Away; H = Home; W = Win; D = Draw; L = Loss

===== Group stage matches =====
20 August 2025 1	BG Pathum United (Thailand)	2–1	(Vietnam) Công An Hà Nội	Pathum Thani, Thailand
19:00 UTC+7	Fornazari (red card) 43'; Chanathip 58', 90+7'; Choolthong (yellow card) 77'; Jantawong (yellow card) 90+2'	Report	Lê Phạm Thành Long (yellow card) 7'; Alan 20'	Stadium: True BG Stadium; Attendance: 5,529; Referee: Asker Nadjafaliev (Uzbekistan)

24 September 2025 2	Công An Hà Nội (Vietnam)	1–0	(Philippines) Dynamic Herb Cebu	Hanoi, Vietnam
19:30 UTC+7	Cao Pendant Quang Vinh 89'	Report		Stadium: Hàng Đẫy Stadium; Attendance: 3,893; Referee: Ryo Tanimoto (Japan)

3 December 2025 3	Buriram United (Thailand)	1–1	(Vietnam) Công An Hà Nội	Buriram, Thailand
19:00 UTC+7	Bissoli (yellow card) 26', (goal) 90+1'; Žulj (red card) 51'; Haiprakhon (yellow card) 67'	Report	Artur 10'; Lê Phạm Thành Long (yellow card) 45+2'; Nguyễn Filip (yellow card) 75'; Lê Văn Đô (yellow card) 90+4'	Stadium: Chang Arena; Attendance: 14,852; Referee: Koki Nagamine (Japan)

28 January 2026 4	Selangor (Malaysia)	2–0	(Vietnam) Công An Hà Nội	Selangor, Malaysia
21:00 UTC+8	Faisal 60', 69'	Report		Stadium: Petaling Jaya Stadium, Attendance: 2,574; Referee: Kim Woo-sung (South Korea)

4 February 2026 5	Công An Hà Nội (Vietnam)	6–1	(Singapore) Tampines Rovers	Hanoi, Vietnam
19:30 UTC+7	Gomes 14'; Lê Văn Đô 28'; Phan Văn Đức 32'; Vitão 74'; Alan 83', 90'	Report	Buhagiar 12'	Stadium: Hàng Đẫy Stadium; Attendance: 4,169; Referee: Chae Sang-hyeop (South Korea)

== Statistics ==
=== Appearances and goals ===
No.	Pos	Nat	Player	Total		V.League 1		Vietnamese Cup		Vietnamese Super Cup		AFC Champions League Two		ASEAN Club Championship	
No.	Pos	Nat	Player	Apps	Goals	Apps	Goals	Apps	Goals	Apps	Goals	Apps	Goals	Apps	Goals
Goalkeepers
1	GK	(Vietnam) VIE	Nguyễn Filip	36	0	23	0	1	0	1	0	7	0	4	0
23	GK	(Vietnam) VIE	Vũ Thành Vinh	6	0	3	0	0	0	0	0	0+2	0	1	0
25	GK	(Vietnam) VIE	Trần Đình Minh Hoàng	0	0	0	0	0	0	0	0	0	0	0	0
32	GK	(Vietnam) VIE	Vũ Tuyên Quang	0	0	0	0	0	0	0	0	0	0	0	0
Defenders
3	DF	(Brazil) BRA	Hugo Gomes	26	2	3+9	0	0+1	0	0+1	0	7	1	5	1
5	DF	(Vietnam) VIE	Đoàn Văn Hậu	16	1	11+1	1	0	0	0	0	2	0	2	0
7	DF	(Vietnam) VIE	Cao Pendant Quang Vinh	36	1	24	0	1	0	1	0	8	0	2	1
17	DF	(Vietnam) VIE	Vũ Văn Thanh	0	0	0	0	0	0	0	0	0	0	0	0
21	DF	(Vietnam) VIE	Trần Đình Trọng	36	0	23+2	0	1	0	1	0	4+3	0	1+1	0
28	DF	(Vietnam) VIE	Nguyễn Văn Đức	13	0	4+6	0	0	0	0	0	0+1	0	0+2	0
36	DF	(Vietnam) VIE	Hoàng Trung Anh	0	0	0	0	0	0	0	0	0	0	0	0
38	DF	(France) FRA	Leygley Adou	29	2	14+5	1	1	0	1	0	5	1	3	0
68	DF	(Vietnam) VIE	Bùi Hoàng Việt Anh	22	1	15	1	0	0	1	0	3+1	0	2	0
Midfielders
6	MF	(Australia) AUS	Stefan Mauk	35	5	22	3	1	1	0	0	8	1	4	0
8	MF	(Brazil) BRA	Vitão	21	2	2+7	0	0	0	1	0	7	1	3+1	1
11	MF	(Vietnam) VIE	Lê Phạm Thành Long	38	1	23+1	1	1	0	1	0	3+4	0	3+2	0
12	MF	(Vietnam) VIE	Hoàng Văn Toản	19	0	1+15	0	0	0	0+1	0	0+1	0	1	0
15	MF	(Vietnam) VIE	Bùi Xuân Thịnh	12	0	1+9	0	0	0	0	0	0+1	0	0+1	0
18	MF	(Vietnam) VIE	Trần Đình Tiến	2	1	0+2	1	0	0	0	0	0	0	0	0
19	MF	(Vietnam) VIE	Nguyễn Quang Hải	35	3	24	3	1	0	1	0	6	0	3	0
22	MF	(Vietnam) VIE	Phạm Minh Phúc	29	3	7+13	3	0+1	0	0	0	0+5	0	2+1	0
26	MF	(Vietnam) VIE	Hà Văn Phương	4	0	1+2	0	0	0	0	0	0	0	0+1	0
27	MF	(Republic of Ireland) IRL	Brandon Ly	3	0	0+3	0	0	0	0	0	0	0	0	0
88	MF	(Vietnam) VIE	Lê Văn Đô	38	5	22+2	2	1	1	0+1	1	5+2	1	5	0
Forwards
9	FW	(Vietnam) VIE	Nguyễn Đình Bắc	33	11	20+2	9	1	0	0+1	1	2+5	1	1+1	0
10	FW	(Brazil) BRA	Léo Artur	33	12	17+2	10	1	0	1	1	6+1	0	3+2	1
20	FW	(Vietnam) VIE	Phan Văn Đức	24	3	5+9	1	0+1	0	1	0	0+4	1	2+2	1
30	FW	(Brazil) BRA	Rogério Alves	23	8	2+8	5	1	0	0	0	6+1	3	4+1	0
55	FW	(Vietnam) VIE	Trần Đức Nam	8	0	0+5	0	0	0	0	0	0+1	0	1+1	0
72	FW	(Brazil) BRA	Alan Grafite	31	21	17	16	0	0	1	1	7+1	1	4+1	3
Players transferred/loaned out during the season
2	DF	(Vietnam) VIE	Phạm Lý Đức	6	0	1+2	0	0	0	0+1	0	0	0	2	0
98	DF	(Vietnam) VIE	Giáp Tuấn Dương	7	0	2+2	0	0	0	0	0	0+2	0	0+1	0

Source: Competitions

=== Goalscorers ===
The list is sorted by squad number when total goals are equal.

Rank	No.	Pos.	Nat.	Player	V.League 1	Vietnamese Cup	Vietnamese Super Cup	AFC Champions League Two	ASEAN Club Championship	Total
1	72	FW	(Brazil)	Alan Grafite	16	0	1	1	3	21
2	9	FW	(Vietnam)	Nguyễn Đình Bắc	10	0	1	1	0	12
3	10	FW	(Brazil)	Léo Artur	10	0	1	0	1	12
4	30	FW	(Brazil)	Rogério Alves	5	0	0	3	0	8
5	6	MF	(Australia)	Stefan Mauk	3	1	0	1	0	5
5	88	MF	(Vietnam)	Lê Văn Đô	3	0	0	1	1	5
6	20	FW	(Vietnam)	Phan Văn Đức	1	0	0	1	1	3
6	19	FW	(Vietnam)	Nguyễn Quang Hải	3	0	0	0	0	3
6	22	MF	(Vietnam)	Phạm Minh Phúc	3	0	0	0	0	3
7	3	DF	(Brazil)	Hugo Gomes	0	0	0	1	1	2
7	8	MF	(Brazil)	Vitão	0	0	0	1	1	2
7	38	DF	(France)	Leygley Adou	1	0	0	1	0	2
8	5	DF	(Vietnam)	Đoàn Văn Hậu	1	0	0	0	0	1
8	7	DF	(Vietnam)	Cao Pendant Quang Vinh	0	0	0	0	1	1
8	11	MF	(Vietnam)	Lê Phạm Thành Long	1	0	0	0	0	1
8	18	MF	(Vietnam)	Trần Đình Tiến	1	0	0	0	0	1
8	68	DF	(Vietnam)	Bùi Hoàng Việt Anh	1	0	0	0	0	1
Own goals					0	0	0	0	0	0
Totals					58	2	3	10	9	82

Source: Competitions
