= Bùi Hoàng Việt Anh =

Vietnamese footballer (born 1999)

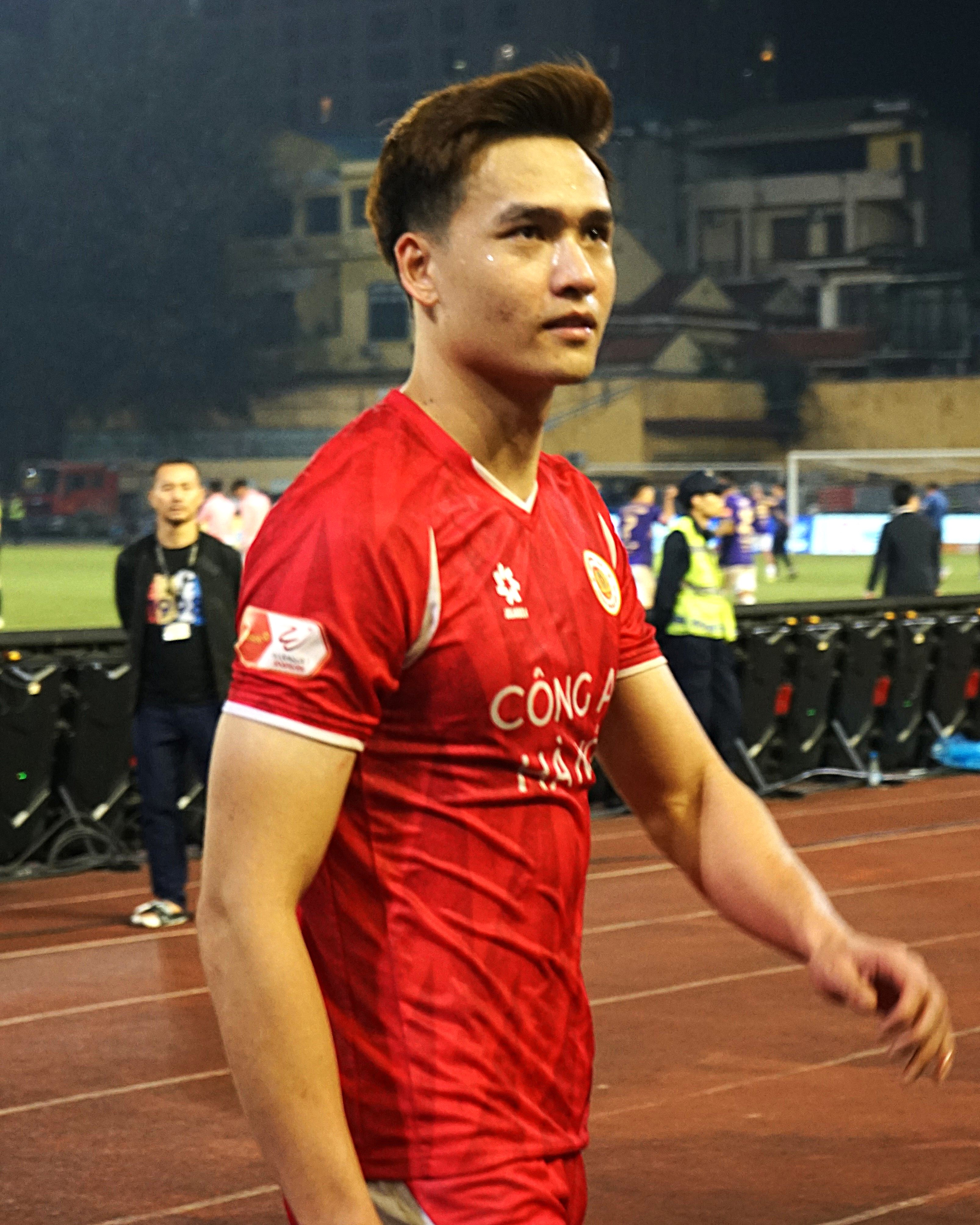
- Việt Anh in 2026

Personal information
- Full name: Bùi Hoàng Việt Anh
- Date of birth: 1 January 1999 (age 27)
- Place of birth: Đông Hưng, Thái Bình, Vietnam
- Height: 1.84 m (6 ft 0 in)
- Positions: Centre-back; defensive midfielder

Team information
- Current team: Công An Hà Nội
- Number: 68

Youth career
- 2012–2018: Hà Nội

Senior career*
Years	Team	Apps	(Gls)
2018–2023	Hà Nội	68	(7)
2018–2019	→ Hồng Lĩnh Hà Tĩnh (loan)	33	(3)
2023–	Công An Hà Nội	63	(6)

International career^{‡}
2018–2019	Vietnam U20	3	(0)
2019–2022	Vietnam U23	19	(1)
2022–	Vietnam	34	(1)
Medal record
Men's football
Representing Vietnam
SEA Games
Gold medal – first place	Hanoi 2021	Team
ASEAN Championship
Runner-up	ASEAN 2022	Team
Winner	ASEAN 2024	Team
- * Club domestic league appearances and goals as of 7 November 2026 ‡ National team caps and goals as of 5 October 2026

Bùi Hoàng Việt Anh (born 1 January 1999) is a Vietnamese professional footballer who plays as a centre-back for V.League 1 club Công An Hà Nội and the Vietnam national team.

== Early career ==
Bùi Hoàng Việt Anh was born in Đông Hưng district, Thái Bình province, to his father Bùi Trọng Điệp and mother Nguyễn Thị Thắm. In 2012, he was admitted to the Hà Nội youth academy after a trial.

== Club career ==
Bùi Hoàng Việt Anh and Hồng Lĩnh Hà Tĩnh won the Vietnamese Second Division in 2019, and were promoted to the V.League in 2020.

In the 2020 V.League 1, Việt Anh became a reliable center-back at Hà Nội when he played in place of Đỗ Duy Mạnh and Trần Đình Trọng, both of whom were injured.

In October 2023, Việt Anh left Hà Nội to move to the defending V.League 1 champion, Công An Hà Nội.

== International career ==
=== Youth level ===
Việt Anh was called up by head coach Park Hang-seo to the Vietnam national U-23 team for the 2020 AFC U-23 Championship.

=== National team ===
In mid-August 2020, he was one of 36 players proposed by head coach Park Hang-seo to be called up to the Vietnam national team, but the training camp was eventually postponed because of the COVID-19 pandemic.

At the 2022 FIFA World Cup qualification third round in Asia, Việt Anh was called up by coach Park Hang-seo to prepare for the match against Australia at Mỹ Đình National Stadium on 7 September 2021.

On 1 February 2022, Việt Anh made his international debut for the Vietnam when he came on as a substitute for Trần Đình Trọng in the first half of the match against the China at Mỹ Đình National Stadium, a match in which Vietnam won 3-1.

== Career statistics ==
=== Club ===
As of match played 7 November 2026

Club	Season	League			Cup		Continental		Other		Total	
Club	Season	Division	Apps	Goals	Apps	Goals	Apps	Goals	Apps	Goals	Apps	Goals
Hồng Lĩnh Hà Tĩnh	2018	V.League 2	15	1	—		—		1 (Note: Appearance in V.League 1 promotion play-off)	0	16	1
Hồng Lĩnh Hà Tĩnh	2019	V.League 2	18	2	2	0	—		—		20	2
Hồng Lĩnh Hà Tĩnh	Total		33	3	2	0	0	0	1	0	36	3
Hà Nội	2020	V.League 1	18	4	3	0	—		1 (Note: Appearance in Vietnamese Super Cup)	0	22	4
Hà Nội	2021	V.League 1	9	0	0	0	—		1	1	10	1
Hà Nội	2022	V.League 1	21	2	5	1	—		—		26	3
Hà Nội	2023	V.League 1	20	1	1	0	—		1	0	22	1
Hà Nội	Total		68	7	9	1	0	0	3	1	80	9
Công An Hà Nội	2023–24	V.League 1	26	5	1	0	—		1	0	28	5
Công An Hà Nội	2024–25	V.League 1	16	0	4	2	—		6 (Note: Appearance in ASEAN Club Championship)	2	26	4
Công An Hà Nội	2025–26	V.League 1	15	1	0	0	4 (Note: Appearance in AFC Champions League Two)	0	3 (Note: One appearance in Vietnamese Super Cup, two appearances in ASEAN Club Championship)	0	22	1
Công An Hà Nội	2026–27	V.League 1	6	0	0	0	3 (Note: Appearances in AFC Champions League Elite)	0	1 (Note: One appearance in Vietnamese Super Cup)	0	10	0
Công An Hà Nội	Total		63	6	5	2	7	0	11	2	86	10
Total career			164	16	16	3	7	0	15	3	203	22

=== International ===
As of match played 26 September 2026

National team	Year	Apps	Goals
Vietnam
Vietnam	2022	6	0
Vietnam	2023	9	0
Vietnam	2024	8	1
Vietnam	2025	0	0
Vietnam	2026	8	0
Total		31	1

Scores and results list Vietnam's goal tally first, score column indicates score after each Bùi Hoàng Việt Anh goal.

List of international goals scored by Bùi Hoàng Việt Anh
No.	Date	Venue	Opponent	Score	Result	Competition
1	24 January 2024	Jassim bin Hamad Stadium, Al Rayyan, Qatar	Iraq	1–0	2–3	2023 AFC Asian Cup

== Honours ==
Hồng Lĩnh Hà Tĩnh

- V.League 2: 2019

Hà Nội

- V.League 1: 2022
- Vietnamese National Cup: 2020, 2022
- Vietnamese Super Cup: 2020, 2021

Công An Hà Nội

- V.League 1: 2025–26
- Vietnamese National Cup: 2024–25
- Vietnamese Super Cup: 2025, 2026
- ASEAN Club Championship runner-up: 2024–25

Vietnam U23

- SEA Games gold medal: 2021

Vietnam

- ASEAN Championship: 2024, 2026; runner-up: 2022
- VFF Cup: 2022

Individual

- Vietnamese Young Player of the Year: 2020
- ASEAN Championship All-Star XI: 2024
