= Vũ Thành Vinh =

Vietnamese footballer

Personal information
- Full name: Vũ Thành Vinh
- Date of birth: 10 March 2005 (age 21)
- Place of birth: Thái Bình, Vietnam
- Height: 1.80 m (5 ft 11 in)
- Position: Goalkeeper

Team information
- Current team: Công An Hà Nội
- Number: 23

Youth career
- –2022: Công An Nhân Dân
- 2020: → Hoàng Anh Gia Lai (youth loan)

Senior career*
Years	Team	Apps	(Gls)
2022–	Công An Hà Nội	2	(0)
2023	Công An Hà Nội B	7	(0)
2024–2025	→ Hoa Binh (loan)	7	(0)
- * Club domestic league appearances and goals as of 31 October 2025

Vũ Thành Vinh (born 10 March 2005) is a Vietnamese professional footballer who plays as a goalkeeper for V.League 1 club Công An Hà Nội.

== Club career ==
In 2022, Thành Vinh started his senior football career and he was a part of Công An Nhân Dân's promotion to V.League 1.

In December 2024, Thành Vinh was loaned out to V.League 2 club Hòa Bình. He made his debut for the club on 18 January, in his first clean sheet of his club against Huế in a 1–0 home win. He made a total of 7 appearances for the team before returning to Công An Hà Nội.

On 23 October 2025, during the match against Macarthur in AFC Champions League Two, after Nguyễn Filip got injured, Thành Vinh was substituted in into the match, thus made his debut for Công An Hà Nội. Later, on 27 October 2025, he made his first clean sheet in his first V.League 1 game, against Công An Hồ Chí Minh City in a 1–0 home victory.

== Honours ==
Công An Hà Nội

- V.League 1: 2025–26
- V.League 2: 2022
- Vietnamese Super Cup: 2025, 2026
