= Trần Bửu Ngọc =

Vietnamese footballer

Personal information
- Full name: Trần Bửu Ngọc
- Date of birth: 26 February 1991 (age 35)
- Place of birth: Cao Lãnh, Đồng Tháp, Vietnam
- Height: 1.92 m (6 ft 4 in)
- Position: Goalkeeper

Youth career
- 2009–2011: Đồng Tháp

Senior career*
Years	Team	Apps	(Gls)
2011–2013	Đồng Tháp	25	(0)
2013–2014	Vissai Ninh Bình	2	(0)
2014–2018	XSKT Cần Thơ	36	(0)
2018–2019	FLC Thanh Hóa	4	(0)
2019	Phố Hiến	6	(0)
2020–2021	Hoàng Anh Gia Lai	15	(0)
2022	Đông Á Thanh Hóa	6	(0)

International career^{‡}
2011–2013	Vietnam U23	5	(0)
2013–2014	Vietnam	1	(0)
- * Club domestic league appearances and goals as of 16 June 2018 ‡ National team caps and goals as of 2 June 2013

Trần Bửu Ngọc (born 26 February 1991) is a retired Vietnamese footballer who played as a goalkeeper.

== International career ==
He made his international debut for Vietnam on 22 March 2013 in a match against Hong Kong.

== Honours ==
=== Club ===
Đông Á Thanh Hóa

- Vietnamese National Cup:

(bronze) Third place : 2022
