= Phạm Lý Đức =

Vietnamese footballer born 2003

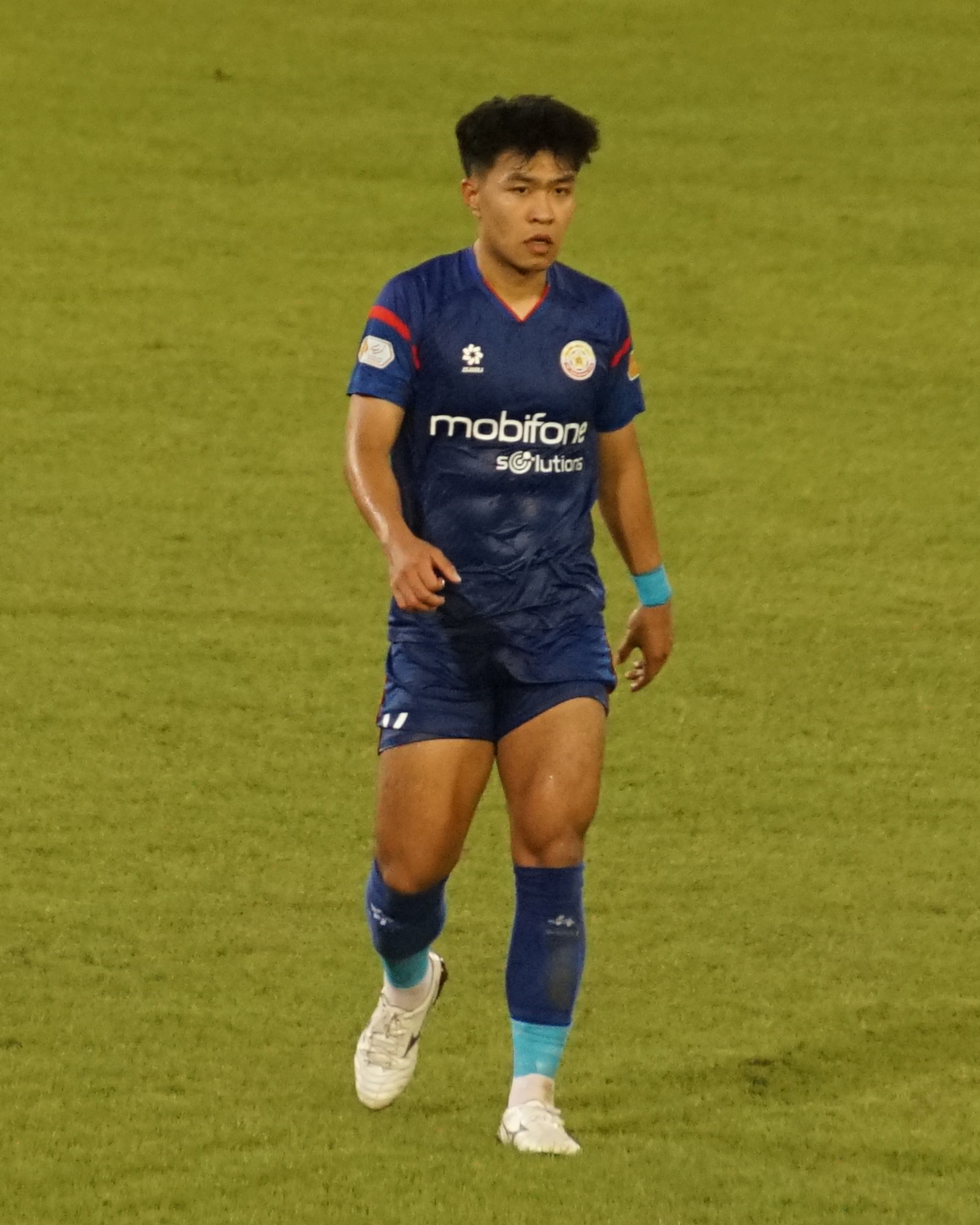
- Lý Đức in 2026

Personal information
- Full name: Phạm Lý Đức
- Date of birth: 14 February 2003 (age 23)
- Place of birth: Tây Ninh, Vietnam
- Height: 1.82 m (6 ft 0 in)
- Position: Center-back

Team information
- Current team: Công An Nhân Dân
- Number: 33

Youth career
- –2020: Hoàng Anh Gia Lai
- 2020–2022: Nutifood

Senior career*
Years	Team	Apps	(Gls)
2022	→ Hồ Chí Minh City Youth (loan)	12	(0)
2023–2025	Hoàng Anh Gia Lai	20	(3)
2023–2024	→ Bà Rịa-Vũng Tàu (loan)	32	(1)
2025–	Công An Hà Nội	3	(0)
2026–	→ Công An Nhân Dân (loan)	19	(1)

International career^{‡}
2025–2026	Vietnam U23	24	(1)
2025–	Vietnam	2	(0)
Medal record
Men's football
Representing Vietnam
AFC U-23 Asian Cup
Third place	Saudi Arabia 2026
ASEAN U-23 Championship
Winner	Indonesia 2025
SEA Games
Gold medal – first place	Bangkok 2025
- * Club domestic league appearances and goals as of 31 October 2026 ‡ National team caps and goals as of 13 November 2026

Phạm Lý Đức (born 14 February 2003) is a Vietnamese professional footballer who plays as a center-back for V.League 2 club Công An Nhân Dân, on loan from Công An Hà Nội.

== Club career ==
Being a youth product of Nutifood, Lý Đức made his senior debut in 2022 with the team at the 2022 Vietnamese Second Division. A year later, after being transferred to Hoàng Anh Gia Lai, he was immediately loaned to V.League 2 side Bà Rịa-Vũng Tàu and made his professional debut there.

After two seasons at Bà Rịa-Vũng Tàu, Lý Đức returned to Hoàng Anh Gia Lai in August 2024, playing in the V.League 1.

On 31 July 2025, Lý Đức was transferred to V.League 1 fellow Công An Hà Nội.

On 25 February 2026, Lý Đức was loaned to PVF-CAND until the end of the season. After the club renamed to Công An Nhân Dân, Lý Đức returned there on loan.

== International career ==
In March 2025, Lý Đức received his first call up to the Vietnam national team for the 2027 AFC Asian Cup qualification game against Laos.

On 11 June 2025, Lý Đức had his first match for the Vietnam national team, the match against Malaysia in the third qualifying round of 2027 AFC Asian Cup qualification.

== Career statistics ==
=== Club ===
As of match played 31 October 2026

Club	Season	League			Cup		Continental		Other		Total	
Club	Season	Division	Apps	Goals	Apps	Goals	Apps	Goals	Apps	Goals	Apps	Goals
Hồ Chí Minh City Youth (loan)	2022	Second Division	12	0	—		—		—		12	0
Bà Rịa-Vũng Tàu (loan)	2023	V.League 2	18	1	2	0	—		—		20	1
Bà Rịa-Vũng Tàu (loan)	2023–24	V.League 2	14	0	1	0	—		—		15	0
Bà Rịa-Vũng Tàu (loan)	Total		32	1	3	0	0	0	0	0	35	1
Hoàng Anh Gia Lai	2024–25	V.League 1	20	3	2	0	—		—		22	3
Công An Hà Nội	2025–26	V.League 1	3	0	0	0	0	0	3 (Note: One appearance in Vietnamese Super Cup, two appearances in ASEAN Club Championship)	0	6	0
Công An Hà Nội	2026–27	V.League 1	0	0	0	0	0	0	—		0	0
Công An Hà Nội	Total		3	0	0	0	0	0	3	0	6	0
Công An Nhân Dân	2025–26	V.League 1	13	1	1	0	—		1 (Note: Appearances in V.League 1 promotion/relegation play-offs)	0	15	1
Công An Nhân Dân	2026–27	V.League 2	6	0	0	0	—		—		6	0
Công An Nhân Dân	Total		19	1	1	0	0	0	1	0	21	1
Total career			86	5	6	0	0	0	4	0	96	5

=== International ===
As of match played 7 August 2026

National team	Year	Apps	Goals
Vietnam	2025	1	0
Vietnam	2026	0	0
Total		1	0

== Honours ==
Công An Hà Nội

- V.League 1: 2025–26
- Vietnamese Super Cup: 2025

Vietnam U23

- ASEAN U-23 Championship: 2025
- SEA Games gold medal: 2025
- AFC U-23 Asian Cup third place: 2026
