= Lê Phạm Thành Long =

Vietnamese footballer (born 1996)

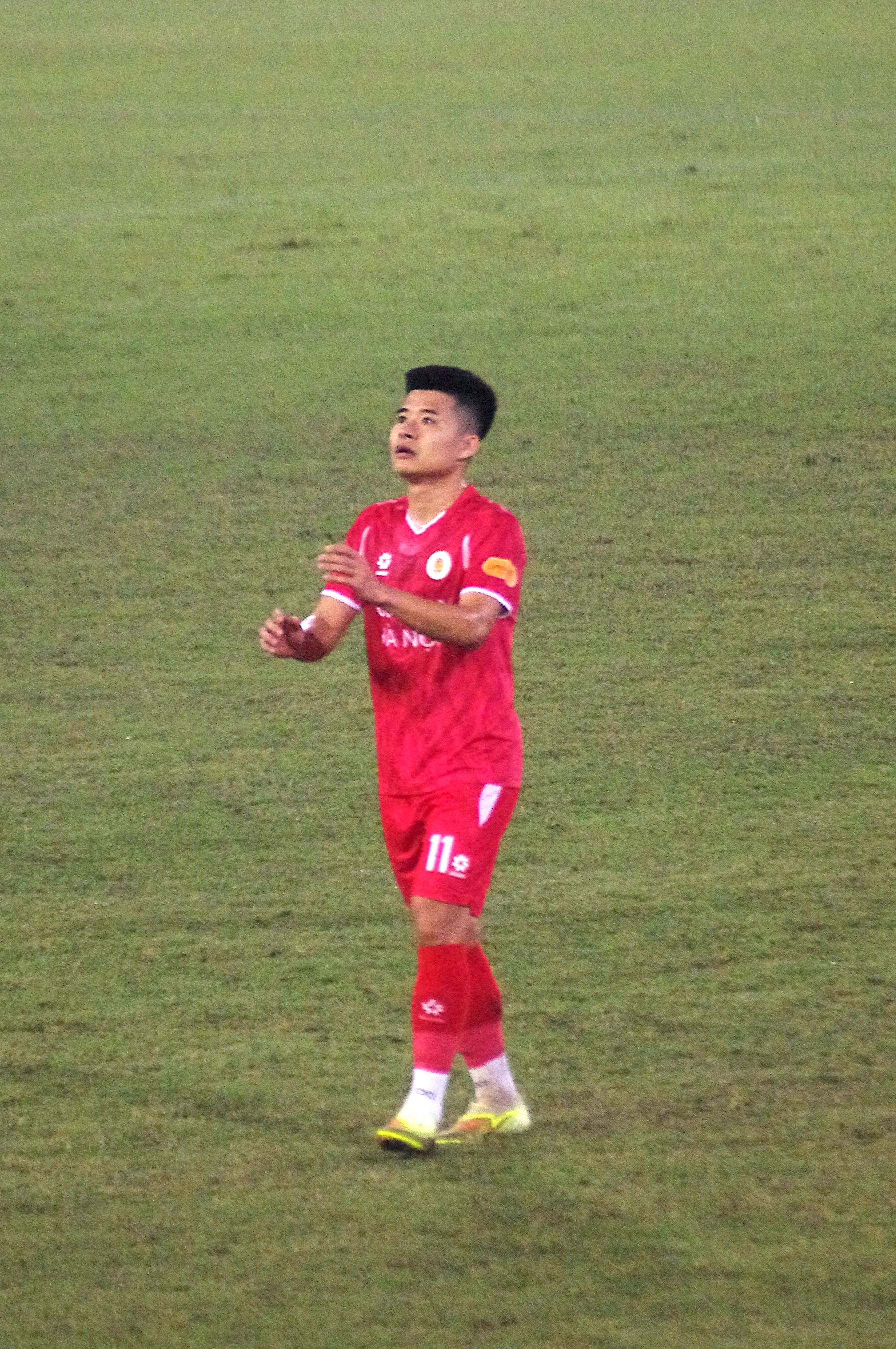
- Thành Long in 2026

Personal information
- Full name: Lê Phạm Thành Long
- Date of birth: 5 June 1996 (age 30)
- Place of birth: Nghĩa Hành, Quảng Ngãi, Vietnam
- Height: 1.65 m (5 ft 5 in)
- Position: Defensive midfielder

Team information
- Current team: Công An Hà Nội
- Number: 11

Youth career
- 2007–2014: Hoàng Anh Gia Lai

Senior career*
Years	Team	Apps	(Gls)
2014–2020	Hoàng Anh Gia Lai	0	(0)
2014–2015	→ Phú Yên (loan)	19	(2)
2016–2017	→ Đắk Lắk (loan)	24	(0)
2017	→ Long An (loan)	13	(1)
2018–2019	→ Hải Phòng (loan)	39	(4)
2020	→ Thanh Hóa (loan)	17	(1)
2021–2023	Đông Á Thanh Hóa	54	(1)
2023–	Công An Hà Nội	81	(4)

International career^{‡}
2023–	Vietnam	25	(0)
Medal record
Men's football
Representing Vietnam
ASEAN Championship
Winner	ASEAN 2024
Winner	ASEAN 2026
- * Club domestic league appearances and goals as of 7 November 2026 ‡ National team caps and goals as of 5 October 2026

Lê Phạm Thành Long (born 5 June 1996) is a Vietnamese professional footballer who plays as a defensive midfielder for V.League 1 club Công An Hà Nội and the Vietnam national team.

== Club career ==
=== Hoàng Anh Gia Lai ===
Born in Quảng Ngãi, Thành Long was admitted to the HAGL – Arsenal JMG Academy at the age of 11. Despite getting promoted to the first team in 2014, Thành Long wasn't given any game time. He was sent out on loan to lower divisions team such as Phú Yên between 2014 and 2015, and then Đắk Lắk between 2016 and 2017.

He left Hoang Anh Gia Lai in 2020 without making any appearance.

=== Long An ===
In the second half of the 2017 V.League 1 season, Thành Long was loaned to Long An. He featured in all 13 games with the team, but Long An ended up finishing last in the league and got relegated.

=== Hải Phòng ===
In 2019, Thành Long was loaned to V.League 1 side Hải Phòng. He quickly gained a starter spot in the team and played a big role on helping his team finishing 6th in the end of the season with 3 goals and 3 assists. Following his good performances, Hải Phòng extended Thành Long's loan deal for one more season. In the following season, Thành Long remained an important player for the Haiphong, but the team struggled and only finished 12th in the league, juat enough to maintain in the top division.

=== Thanh Hóa ===
Thành Long was loaned to Thanh Hóa in the 2020 season. Thành Long was a regular starter with Thanh Hóa and helped the team finishing third before the league was cancelled due to the serious COVID-19 pandemic situation in Vietnam. He joined Thanh Hóa on a permanent deal in November 2021, signing a three-year contract.

In 2023, coach Velizar Popov, decided to play Thành Long as a deep-lying midfielder to take advantage of this abilities to recover the ball, dictate the tempo and provide scoring occasions. Thành Long gained media attention following his good performances and was considered as one of the best midfielders in V.League.

=== Công An Hà Nội ===
On 19 September 2023, Thành Long joined V.League 1 defending champions Công An Hà Nội, signing a three-year contract.

== International career ==
Thành Long was named in Vietnam Olympic team preliminary squad for the 2018 Asian Games but wasn't included in the final list.

In June 2023, Thành Long received his first senior team called up for the friendly match against Hong Kong. He made his international debut on 21 November 2023 in a 0–1 loss against Iraq as part of 2026 FIFA World Cup qualification.

In January 2024, he was named in Vietnam's 26-men squad for the 2023 AFC Asian Cup.

== Career statistics ==
=== Club ===
As of match played 19 November 2026

Appearances and goals by club, season and competition
Club	Season	League			National cup		Continental		Other		Total	
Club	Season	Division	Apps	Goals	Apps	Goals	Apps	Goals	Apps	Goals	Apps	Goals
Phú Yên	2014	Second Division	6	1	—		—		1 (Note: Appearances in Second Division promotion play-offs)	0	7	1
Phú Yên	2015	V.League 2	13	1	1	0	—		—		14	1
Phú Yên	Total		19	2	1	0	—		1	0	21	2
Đắk Lắk	2016	V.League 2	16	0	1	0	—		—		17	0
Đắk Lắk	2017	V.League 2	8	0	1	0	—		—		9	0
Đắk Lắk	Total		24	0	2	0	—		—		26	0
Long An	2017	V.League 1	13	1	—		—		—		13	1
Hải Phòng	2018	V.League 1	20	3	1	0	—		—		21	3
Hải Phòng	2019	V.League 1	19	1	2	0	—		—		21	1
Hải Phòng	Total		39	4	3	0	—		—		42	4
Đông Á Thanh Hóa	2020	V.League 1	17	1	0	0	—		—		17	1
Đông Á Thanh Hóa	2021	V.League 1	12	0	0	0	—		—		12	0
Đông Á Thanh Hóa	2022	V.League 1	23	1	3	0	—		—		26	1
Đông Á Thanh Hóa	2023	V.League 1	19	0	4	0	—		—		23	0
Đông Á Thanh Hóa	Total		71	2	7	0	—		—		78	2
Công An Hà Nội	2023–24	V.League 1	25	1	1	0	—		1 (Note: Appearances in Vietnamese Super Cup)	0	27	1
Công An Hà Nội	2024–25	V.League 1	25	2	4	0	—		8 (Note: Appearances in ASEAN Club Championship)	0	37	2
Công An Hà Nội	2025–26	V.League 1	24	1	1	0	7 (Note: Appearances in AFC Champions League Two)	0	6 (Note: One appearance in Vietnamese Super Cup; five appearances in ASEAN Club Championship)	0	38	1
Công An Hà Nội	2026–27	V.League 1	7	0	0	0	4 (Note: Appearances in AFC Champions League Elite)	0	3 (Note: One appearance and one goal in Vietnamese Super Cup; two appearances in ASEAN Club Championship)	1	14	1
Công An Hà Nội	Total		81	4	6	0	11	0	18	1	116	5
Total career			247	13	19	0	11	0	19	1	296	14

=== International ===
As of match played 26 September 2026

Appearances and goals by national team and year
National team	Year	Apps	Goals
Vietnam	2023	1	0
Vietnam	2024	7	0
Vietnam	2025	3	0
Vietnam	2026	11	0
Total		22	0

== Honours ==
Thanh Hóa

- Vietnamese Cup: 2023

Công An Hà Nội

- V.League 1: 2025–26
- Vietnamese Cup: 2024–25
- Vietnamese Super Cup: 2025, 2026
- ASEAN Club Championship runner-up: 2024–25

Vietnam

- ASEAN Championship: 2024, 2026
