= Nguyễn Vũ Tín =

Vietnamese footballer

Personal information
- Full name: Nguyễn Vũ Tín
- Date of birth: 1 January 1998 (age 28)
- Place of birth: Nghĩa Hành, Quảng Ngãi, Vietnam
- Height: 1.72 m (5 ft 8 in)
- Position: Left-back

Team information
- Current team: Hải Phòng
- Number: 39

Youth career
- 2010–2017: PVF Football Academy

Senior career*
Years	Team	Apps	(Gls)
2017	Hà Nội	2	(0)
2017–2022	Sài Gòn	35	(3)
2021	→ Phố Hiến (loan)	6	(1)
2023–2026	Công An Hồ Chí Minh City	60	(1)
2026	PVF-CAND	10	(0)
2026–	Hải Phòng	2	(0)
- * Club domestic league appearances and goals as of 13 September 2026

Nguyễn Vũ Tín (born 1 January 1998) is a Vietnamese professional footballer who plays as a left-back for V.League 1 club Hải Phòng.
