= Phạm Minh Phúc =

Vietnamese footballer

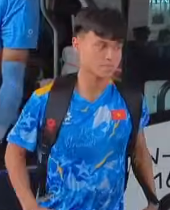
- Minh Phúc in 2025

Personal information
- Full name: Phạm Minh Phúc
- Date of birth: 7 February 2004 (age 22)
- Place of birth: Hưng Yên, Vietnam
- Height: 1.72 m (5 ft 8 in)
- Positions: Right-back; winger

Team information
- Current team: Công An Nhân Dân
- Number: 22

Youth career
- –2023: Công An Hà Nội

Senior career*
| Years | Team | Apps | (Gls) |
| 2022–2023 | Công An Hà Nội B | 13 | (4) |
| 2024– | Công An Hà Nội | 31 | (4) |
| 2026– | → Công An Nhân Dân (loan) | 5 | (0) |

International career^{‡}
| 2025–2026 | Vietnam U23 | 23 | (3) |
| 2026– | Vietnam | 2 | (0) |
Medal record
Men's football
Representing Vietnam
AFC U-23 Asian Cup
| Third place | Saudi Arabia 2026 |
ASEAN U-23 Championship
| Winner | Indonesia 2025 |
- * Club domestic league appearances and goals as of 31 October 2026 ‡ National team caps and goals as of 17 November 2026

Phạm Minh Phúc (born 7 February 2004) is a Vietnamese professional footballer who plays as a right-back or winger for V.League 2 club Công An Nhân Dân, on loan from Công An Hà Nội and the Vietnam national team.

== Club career ==
Born in Hưng Yên, Minh Phúc is a youth product of the Công An Hà Nội.

Ahead of the 2024–25 season, Minh Phúc was promoted to Công An Hà Nội's first team by head coach Alexandré Pölking. On 5 May 2025, he scored his first goal for the team in their 3–0 V.League 1 win against Quảng Nam.

In August 2026, Minh Phúc was loaned to V.League 2 club Công An Nhân Dân.

== International career ==
Minh Phúc was part of the Vietnam under-23s squad that won the 2025 ASEAN U-23 Championship.

== Career statistics ==
=== Club ===
As of match played 31 October 2026

| Club | Season | League | | | Cup | | Continental | | Other | | Total | |
| Club | Season | Division | Apps | Goals | Apps | Goals | Apps | Goals | Apps | Goals | Apps | Goals |
|---|---|---|---|---|---|---|---|---|---|---|---|---|
| Công An Hà Nội B | 2022 | Third Division | 5 | 3 | — | | — | | — | | 5 | 3 |
| Công An Hà Nội B | 2023 | Third Division | 8 | 1 | — | | — | | — | | 8 | 1 |
| Công An Hà Nội B | Total | | 13 | 4 | 0 | 0 | 0 | 0 | 0 | 0 | 13 | 4 |
| Công An Hà Nội | 2024–25 | V.League 1 | 10 | 1 | 3 | 0 | — | | 1 (Note: Appearances in ASEAN Club Championship) | 0 | 13 | 1 |
| Công An Hà Nội | 2025–26 | V.League 1 | 21 | 3 | 1 | 0 | 5 (Note: Appearances in the AFC Champions League Two) | 0 | 2 | 0 | 29 | 3 |
| Công An Hà Nội | 2026–27 | V.League 1 | 0 | 0 | 0 | 0 | 1 (Note: Appearances in AFC Champions League Elite) | 0 | — | | 1 | 0 |
| Công An Hà Nội | Total | | 31 | 4 | 4 | 0 | 6 | 0 | 3 | 0 | 44 | 4 |
| Công An Nhân Dân (loan) | 2026–27 | V.League 2 | 5 | 0 | 1 | 0 | — | | — | | 6 | 0 |
| Total career | | | 49 | 8 | 5 | 0 | 6 | 0 | 3 | 0 | 63 | 8 |

== Honours ==
Công An Hà Nội

- V.League 1: 2025–26
- Vietnamese Cup: 2024–25
- Vietnamese Super Cup: 2025

Vietnam U23

- ASEAN U-23 Championship: 2025
- SEA Games gold medal: 2025
- AFC U-23 Asian Cup third place: 2026
