= Leygley Adou =

French professional footballer (born 1997)

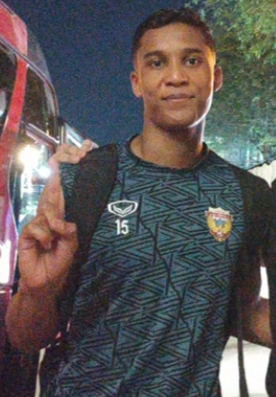
- Adou in 2025

Personal information
- Full name: Leygley Minh Adou
- Date of birth: 9 September 1997 (age 29)
- Place of birth: Grenoble, France
- Height: 1.78 m (5 ft 10 in)
- Positions: Center-back; right back

Team information
- Current team: Cong An Hanoi
- Number: 38

Youth career
- –2008: AJ AT Villeneuve Grenoble
- 2008–2016: Grenoble

Senior career*
Years	Team	Apps	(Gls)
2016–2017	Grenoble B		
2016–2017	Grenoble	1	(0)
2017–2020	Annecy	38	(0)
2020–2024	Racing Besançon	72	(0)
2024–2025	Hong Linh Ha Tinh	22	(1)
2025–	Cong An Hanoi	25	(1)

International career^{‡}
2026–	Vietnam	4	(0)
- * Club domestic league appearances and goals as of 22 October 2026 ‡ National team caps and goals as of 5 October 2026

Leygley Minh Adou (born 9 September 1997), also known as Nguyễn Adou Leygley Minh or Adou Minh, is a professional footballer who plays as a center-back or right back for V.League 1 club Cong An Hanoi. Born in France, he plays for the Vietnam national team.

== Club career ==
A native of Grenoble, Adou began his youth playing for local team AJ AT Villeneuve Grenoble, before joining the youth academy of Grenoble Foot 38 at the age of 11. He made his senior debut with the club in the 2015–16 CFA. In July 2017, he signed for Annecy and remained there for three seasons.

In July 2020, Adou moved to Racing Besançon in search for more game time. As the team vice-captain, he played an important role in the team's promotion to the Championnat National 2, after topping Group E in the 2021–22 Championnat National 3.

In August 2024, Adou joined V.League 1 side Hong Linh Ha Tinh as a free agent, signing his first professional contract. As he has Vietnamese origins, he was registered by the club as an unnaturalized overseas Vietnamese player. He made his professional debut on 14 September 2024 in the first matchday of the 2024–25 V.League 1, and scored the only goal of the game to help this club defeat the defending champions Thep Xanh Nam Dinh.

On 25 July 2025, Adou was transferred to V.League 1 fellow Cong An Hanoi.

== International career ==
In September 2026, Adou received his first call up to the Vietnam national team, being named in the squad for the 2026 FIFA ASEAN Cup.

== Personal life ==
Adou was born in France to a French father and Vietnamese mother.

On 21 August 2026, Adou received his Vietnamese citizenship, with the Vietnamese personal name Nguyễn Adou Leygley Minh.

== Career statistics ==
=== Club ===
As of match played 3 November 2026

Appearances and goals by club, season and competition
Club	Season	League			National cup		Continental		Other		Total	
Club	Season	Division	Apps	Goals	Apps	Goals	Apps	Goals	Apps	Goals	Apps	Goals
Grenoble	2015–16	CFA	1	0	1	1	—		—		2	1
Grenoble	2016–17	CFA	0	0	0	0	—		—		0	0
Grenoble	Total		1	0	1	1	0	0	0	0	2	1
Annecy	2017–18	National 2	14	0	0	0	—		—		14	0
Annecy	2018–19	National 2	15	0	2	0	—		—		17	0
Annecy	2019–20	National 2	9	0	1	0	—		—		10	0
Annecy	Total		38	0	3	0	0	0	0	0	41	0
Racing Besançon	2020–21	National 3	6	0	2	0	—		—		8	0
Racing Besançon	2021–22	National 3	24	0	0	0	—		—		24	0
Racing Besançon	2022–23	National 2	21	0	0	0	—		—		21	0
Racing Besançon	2023–24	National 2	21	0	1	0	—		—		22	0
Racing Besançon	Total		72	0	3	0	0	0	0	0	75	0
Hong Linh Ha Tinh	2024–25	V.League 1	22	1	1	0	—		—		23	1
Cong An Hanoi	2025–26	V.League 1	20	1	1	0	5 (Note: Appearances in the AFC Champions League Two)	1	4 (Note: One appearance in the Vietnamese Super Cup; three appearances in ASEAN Club Championship)	0	30	2
Cong An Hanoi	2026–27	V.League 1	5	0	0	0	5 (Note: Appearances in AFC Champions League Elite)	0	2 (Note: One appearance in Vietnamese Super Cup; one appearance in ASEAN Club Championship)	0	12	0
Cong An Hanoi	Total		25	1	1	0	10	1	6	0	42	2
Career total			158	2	9	1	10	1	6	0	183	4

== Honours ==
Công An Hà Nội

- V.League 1: 2025–26
- Vietnamese Super Cup: 2025, 2026

Individual

- V.League 1 Team of the Season: 2024–25
