= Cong An Nhan Dan FC (2026) =

Vietnamese football club

Công An Nhân Dân
- Full name: Công An Nhân Dân Football Club
- Founded: 2018; 8 years ago as Phố Hiến FC
- Ground: PVF Stadium
- Capacity: 4,500
- Owner: Ministry of Public Security
- Chairman: Lê Cảnh Duy
- Head coach: Nguyễn Đức Thắng
- League: V.League 2
- 2025–26: V.League 1, 13th of 14 (relegated)
- Website: https://www.facebook.com/CLBcongannhandan/
| Home colours | Away colours |

Cong An Nhan Dan Football Club (Vietnamese: Câu lạc bộ bóng đá Công an Nhân dân), simply known as CAND, is a professional football club based in Hưng Yên, Vietnam. The club play their home matches at PVF Stadium and compete in the V.League 2, the second tier of Vietnamese football league system. Formed in 2018 as Phố Hiến FC, the club adopted the name PVF-CAND in 2023, before adopting their current name in 2026.

== History ==
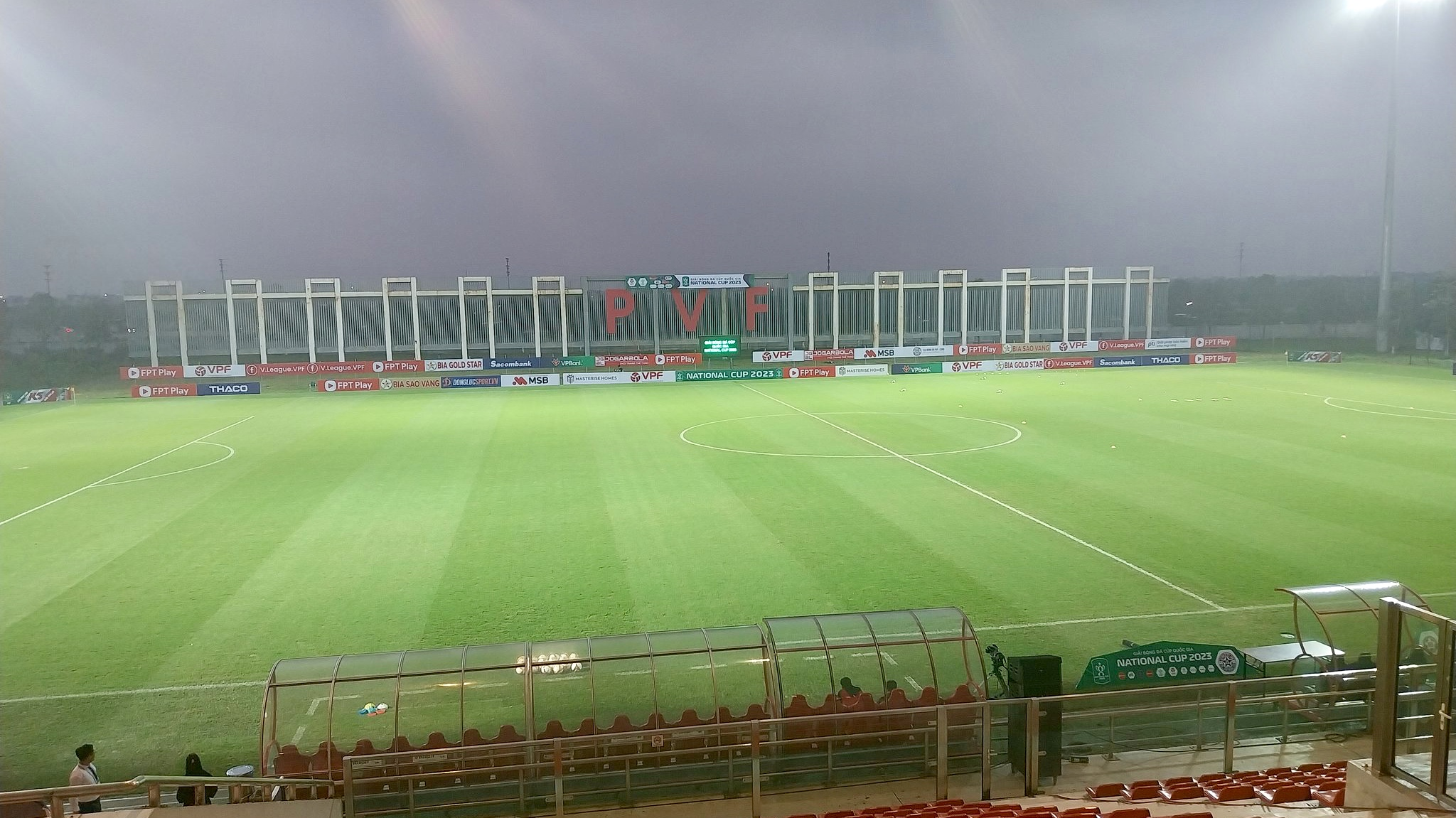
View of the PVF Stadium.

Prior to the creation of the team, the PVF Football Academy handed every year all its graduated players to other Vietnamese professional football clubs, which caused difficulties for several players to adapt to the new environment. For that reason, Vingroup, the owner of the PVF Academy established Phố Hiến FC in April 2018 in order to receive the graduated players from the PVF Academy and introduce them to the professional football level. The team's home ground PVF Stadium is situated in the PVF Football Academy training center located in Hưng Yên. During the first season of its existence, club competed in the 2018 Vietnamese National Football Second League and won the promotion to the 2019 V.League 2 after defeating Bà Rịa-Vũng Tàu in the promotion play-offs. In the following season at the professional level, the club left big impressions to the media and fans as they finished runner-up in the V.League 2 with the youngest squad among all the teams.

Since 2023, the club is owned by the Ministry of Public Security and adopted the name PVF-CAND, with CAND as an abbreviation for People's Public Security (Công An Nhân Dân). In the 2023 season, the club finished as V.League 2 runner-up for the second time in their history and reached the Vietnamese Cup semi-finals, being the first V.League 2 team to achieve that since 2005.

On 4 August 2025, following Quảng Nam withdrawal from the 2025–26 V.League 1, PVF-CAND, who finished third in the 2024–25 V.League 2's was chosen by the VPF to replace Quang Nam's slot, as V.League 2 runners-up Trường Tươi Đồng Nai refused to promote. This was PVF-CAND's first ever appearance in the V.League 1.

In their first season in the top flight, PVF-CAND finished 13th. The team entered the relegation play-offs against V.League 2 runners-up Bắc Ninh and was defeated in the penalty shootout after a 1–1 draw in regular time, relegating back to the V.League 2 after one season. This also marked their third defeat in a row in the V.League 1 relegation/promotion play-offs in history. Following their relegation, the club changed their name to Công An Nhân Dân.

== Name history ==
- 2018–2022: Pho Hien FC (Câu lạc bộ bóng đá Phố Hiến)
- 2023–2026: PVF-CAND FC (Câu lạc bộ bóng đá PVF-CAND)
- 2026–present: Cong An Nhan Dan FC (Câu lạc bộ bóng đá Công an Nhân dân)

== Domestic league records ==
| Season | Pld | Won | Draw | Lost | GF | GA | GD | PTS | Final position | Notes |
|---|---|---|---|---|---|---|---|---|---|---|
| 2019 V.League 2 | 22 | 11 | 7 | 4 | 37 | 22 | +15 | 40 | 2nd | Qualification for promotion play-offs (lost 1-0 to Thanh Hoa) |
| 2020 V.League 2 | 16 | 7 | 5 | 4 | 19 | 11 | +8 | 26 | 4th | |
| 2021 V.League 2 | 6 | 0 | 3 | 3 | 2 | 6 | −4 | 3 | 12th | The season was abandoned |
| 2022 V.League 2 | 22 | 10 | 8 | 4 | 40 | 22 | +18 | 38 | 5th | |
| 2023 V.League 2 | 18 | 11 | 4 | 3 | 30 | 14 | +16 | 37 | 2nd | |
| 2023–24 V.League 2 | 20 | 9 | 10 | 1 | 26 | 7 | +19 | 37 | 2nd | Qualification for promotion play-offs (lost 3-2 to Hong Linh Ha Tinh) |
| 2024–25 V.League 2 | 20 | 13 | 4 | 3 | 29 | 12 | +17 | 43 | 3rd | Promoted to 2025–26 V.League 1 |

== Players ==
=== Current squad ===
As of 3 September 2026

Note: Flags indicate national team as defined under FIFA eligibility rules; some limited exceptions apply. Players may hold more than one non-FIFA nationality.

| No. | Pos. | Nation | Player |
|---|---|---|---|
| 1 | GK | VIE | Nguyễn Đình Triệu |
| 2 | DF | GER | Hong Lac Luong Thanh |
| 3 | DF | VIE | Dương Thanh Hào |
| 4 | DF | VIE | Nguyễn Hiểu Minh |
| 5 | DF | VIE | Đoàn Anh Việt |
| 6 | MF | VIE | Đậu Văn Toàn |
| 7 | MF | VIE | Trần Đình Tiến |
| 8 | MF | VIE | Trần Minh Vương |
| 9 | MF | VIE | Nguyễn Xuân Bắc |
| 10 | MF | VIE | Mạch Ngọc Hà |
| 11 | FW | VIE | Nguyễn Thanh Nhàn |
| 12 | DF | VIE | Nguyễn Bảo Long |
| 14 | FW | VIE | Nguyễn Văn Sơn |
| 15 | DF | VIE | Hồ Khắc Lương |
| 17 | MF | VIE | Thái Bá Đạt |
| 20 | DF | VIE | Võ Anh Quân |

| No. | Pos. | Nation | Player |
|---|---|---|---|
| 21 | MF | VIE | Phạm Văn Luân |
| 22 | MF | VIE | Phạm Minh Phúc (on loan from Công An Hà Nội) |
| 23 | MF | VIE | Lê Viktor |
| 26 | GK | VIE | Tống Đức An |
| 28 | FW | VIE | Tẩy Văn Toàn |
| 29 | MF | VIE | Nguyễn Trọng Long |
| 32 | DF | VIE | Nguyễn Tiến Đỉnh |
| 33 | DF | VIE | Phạm Lý Đức (on loan from Công An Hà Nội) |
| 61 | MF | VIE | Nguyễn Vadim |
| 66 | DF | VIE | Huỳnh Minh Đoàn |
| 68 | MF | VIE | Nguyễn Hoàng Anh (on loan from PVF) |
| 86 | FW | BRA | Gonzalo Fornari |
| 88 | MF | VIE | Huỳnh Công Đến |
| 89 | GK | VIE | Trương Thái Hiếu |
| 94 | DF | VIE | Nguyễn Văn Dũng |
| 95 | DF | BRA | Gustavo |

=== Other players under contract ===
Note: Flags indicate national team as defined under FIFA eligibility rules; some limited exceptions apply. Players may hold more than one non-FIFA nationality.

| No. | Pos. | Nation | Player |
|---|---|---|---|
| 27 | DF | VIE | Trần Ngọc Sơn |
| 37 | MF | VIE | Phùng Viết Trường |
| — | MF | VIE | Nguyễn Huy Hùng |

=== Notable players ===
The players in bold had capped for the Vietnam national team while playing for the club.

- Huỳnh Công Đến
- Lê Bật Hiếu
- Lê Minh Bình
- Lê Ngọc Bảo
- **Lê Văn Đô**
- Lục Xuân Hưng
- Martin Lo
- Nguyễn Bảo Long
- Nguyễn Đức Phú
- **Nguyễn Thanh Nhàn**
- Nguyễn Trọng Long
- Nguyễn Xuân Nam
- Phí Minh Long
- Thái Bá Đạt
- Trần Bửu Ngọc
- Võ Nguyên Hoàng

== Managers ==
=== Current staff ===
As of 1 April 2025

| Position | Name |
|---|---|
| Manager | (Vietnam) Trần Phi Hùng |
| Head coach | (Vietnam) Nguyễn Đức Thắng |
| Assistant coach | (Vietnam) Mai Tiến Thành (Vietnam) Nguyễn Duy Đông (Vietnam) Nguyễn Quốc Trung |
| Goalkeeping coach | (Vietnam) Vũ Đức Sơn |
| Physiotherapist | (Vietnam) Nguyễn Trí Nhân |
| Interpreter | (Vietnam) Nguyễn Ngọc Sơn |
| Logistics officer | (Vietnam) Phạm Đức Hải |

=== Managerial history ===
- 2018: (England) Andy Preece
- 2018–2021: (Vietnam) Hứa Hiền Vinh
- 2022–2025: (Portugal) Mauro Jeronimo
- 2025: (Vietnam) Thạch Bảo Khanh
- 2025–2026: (Vietnam) Nguyễn Thành Công
- 2026: (Vietnam) Trần Tiến Đại
- 2026–present: (Vietnam) Nguyễn Đức Thắng

== Kit suppliers and shirt sponsors ==
| Period | Kit manufacturer | Shirt sponsor |
|---|---|---|
| 2020–2022 | (Thailand) Grand Sport | Tan A Dai Thanh; Yanmar Văn Lang University; Ben Thanh Holdings |
| 2023– | (Vietnam) Kamito | |

== Honours ==
=== Senior ===
==== National competitions ====
- Vietnamese Second Division
  - Third place (1): 2018
- V.League 2
  - Runners-up (3): 2019, 2023, 2023–24
- Vietnamese National Cup
  - Third place (1): 2023

==== Other competitions ====
- Four-Team Football Tournament - Thái Nguyên:
  - Third place (1): 2025

=== Youth ===
- Vietnamese National U-21 Football Championship
  - Winners (1): 2023
  - Runners-up (1): 2019
  - Third place (1): 2021

== Reserves team ==
PVF-CAND B
- Full name: PVF-Cong An Nhan Dan B Football Club; Câu lạc bộ bóng đá Trẻ PVF-Công An Nhân Dân
- Founded: 2024; 2 years ago
- Ground: PVF Stadium
- Capacity: 4,500
- Owner: Ministry of Public Security
- Website: Website

The reserves team of PVF-CAND was established in 2024. The team competed at the 2025–26 V.League 2, finishing at sixth place. After their first season at professional level. The team transferred their V.League 2 participation slot to the newly created team Hưng Yên.

The team served mainly to train and develop youth players from the PVF Football Academy, as a preparation step for the players before joining the first team of PVF-CAND.

In 2024, PVF-CAND B was formed and entered the 2024 Third Division. The team finished as the best third-placed team and promoted to the 2025 Second Division. There, the team finished third in their group. Initially, this position did not earn the club a promotion to the 2025–26 V.League 2. However, the team promoted after several teams withdrew from the V.League 2. The team finished sixth in their first season in V.League 2. However, following the relegation of their parent club, PVF-CAND, to V.League 2, the two teams could not compete in the same division as both share the same legal entity. As the result, the team's team V.League 2 participation slot was given to Hưng Yên, a team in the same province.
