= Trần Đình Tiến =

Vietnamese footballer (born 2001)

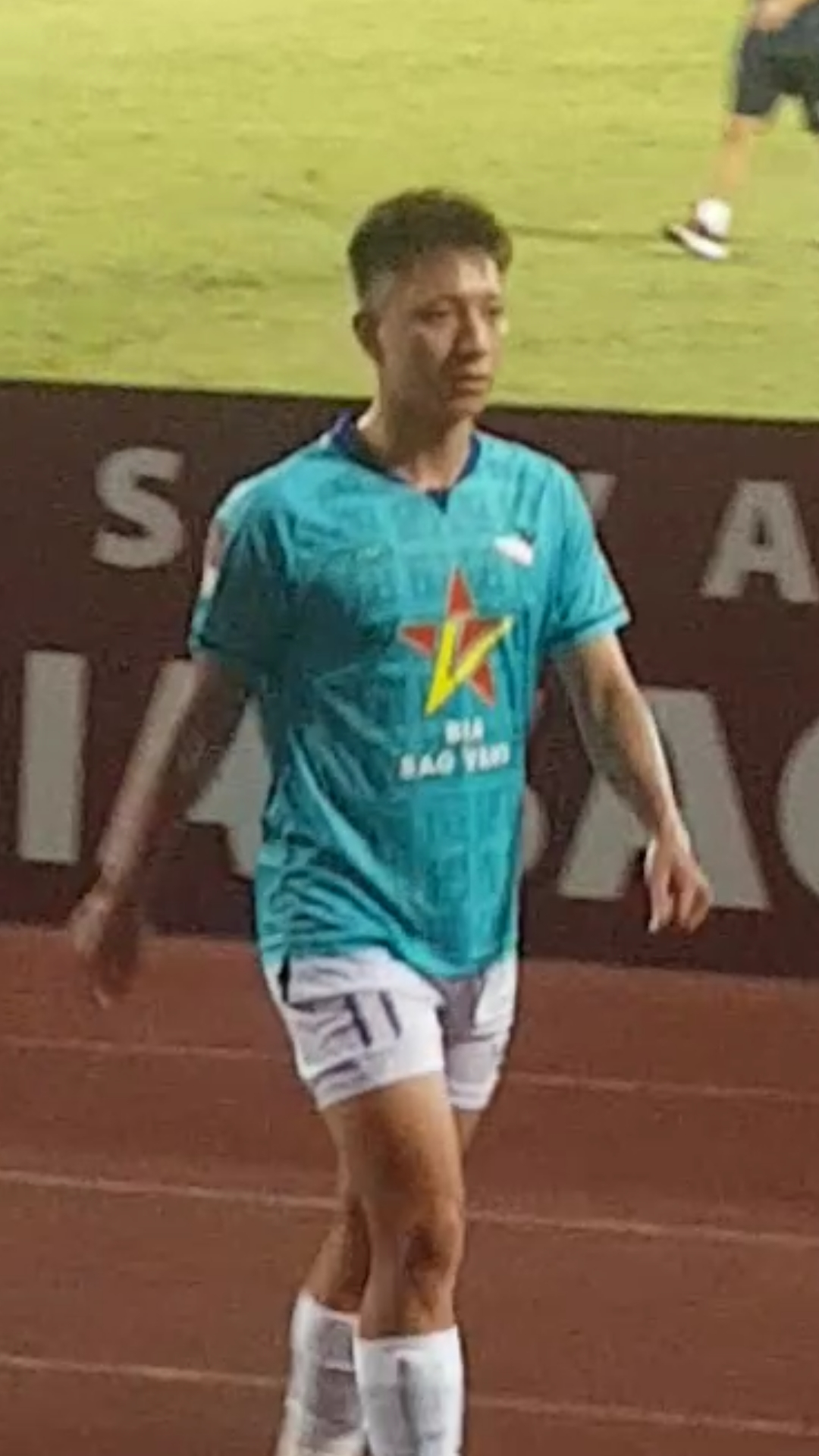
- Đình Tiến in 2024

Personal information
- Full name: Trần Đình Tiến
- Date of birth: 9 November 1998 (age 28)
- Place of birth: Hoàng Mai, Nghệ An, Vietnam
- Height: 1.72 m (5 ft 8 in)
- Position: Winger

Team information
- Current team: Công An Hà Nội
- Number: 18

Youth career
- 2015–2019: Sông Lam Nghệ An

Senior career*
Years	Team	Apps	(Gls)
2019–2023	Sông Lam Nghệ An	47	(2)
2019	→ Cần Thơ (loan)	13	(1)
2023–2025	Hồng Lĩnh Hà Tĩnh	44	(6)
2025–	Công An Hà Nội	2	(1)
- * Club domestic league appearances and goals as of 7 June 2026

Trần Đình Tiến (born 9 November 1998) is a Vietnamese professional footballer who plays as a winger for V.League 1 club Công An Hà Nội.

== Club career ==
Born in Nghệ An, Đình Tiến was a youth product of Sông Lam Nghệ An. He was promoted to the first team in 2019, but was immediately loaned to V.League 2 club Cần Thơ for one season. He scored 2 goals and assisted 3 in the 2019 V.League 2 season.

In August 2023, in search for more game time, he left Sông Lam Nghệ An after 4 seasons and signed for their rival Hồng Lĩnh Hà Tĩnh.

== Honours ==
Công An Hà Nội

- V.League 1: 2025–26
- Vietnamese Super Cup: 2025
