= Dương Đức Hải =

Vietnamese policeman and president of Cong An Hanoi FC

Major General, Doctorate Dương Đức Hải

Member of the National Assembly
- Incumbent
- Assumed office 21 March 2026
- Chairman: Trần Thanh Mẫn
- Constituency: Hanoi (2026–present)
- Majority: 85.22% (16th term)

Deputy Director of Hanoi's People's Public Security
- Incumbent
- Assumed office 1 July 2022
- Director: Nguyễn Hải Trung; Nguyễn Thanh Tùng

President of Cong An Hanoi FC
- In office 9 January 2023 – 13 April 2026
- Preceded by: Position established
- Succeeded by: Nguyễn Tiến Đạt

Head of the Traffic Police Department of Hanoi's People's Public Security
- In office 26 October 2018 – 1 July 2022
- Preceded by: Đào Vịnh Thắng
- Succeeded by: Trần Đình Nghĩa

Personal details
- Born: 13 March 1977 (age 49) Phụng Thượng, Phúc Thọ, Hanoi (now Phúc Thọ commune, Hanoi)
- Party: Communist Party of Vietnam
- Education: Ngọc Tao High School

Military service
- Branch/service: Vietnam People's Public Security
- Years of service: 2024–present
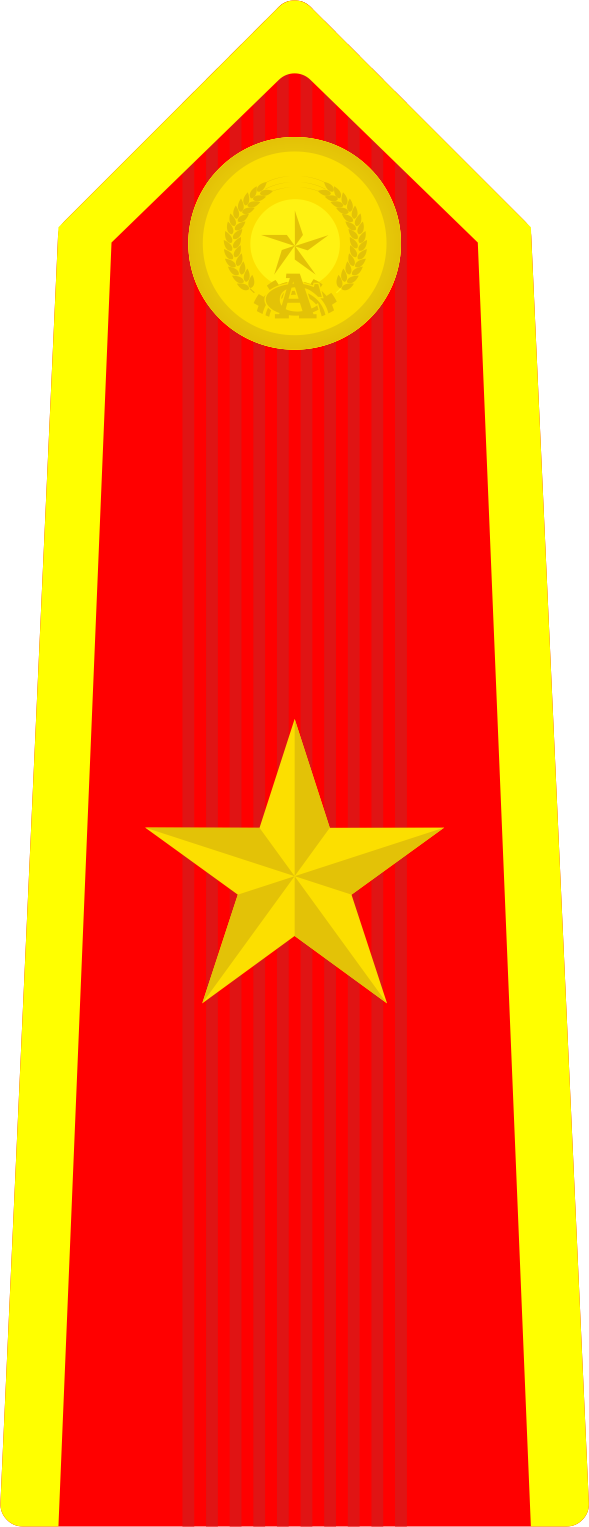
- Rank: Major general
- Unit: Hanoi's People's Public Security

Dương Đức Hải (born March 13, 1977) is a major general in the Vietnam People's Public Security. He is currently the deputy director of Hanoi's People's Public Security, the former president of Cong An Hanoi FC from 2023 to 2026, and the member of the National Assembly representing Hanoi.

== History of rank conferment ==
Year of ordination	2024
Rank	
Title	Major general
