= PVF Hưng Yên Stadium =

Stadium in Hưng Yên, Vietnam

Coordinates: 20°55′40″N 105°56′44″E

- Interactive map of PVF Hưng Yên Stadium
- Address: Nghĩa Trụ Commune, Hưng Yên, Vietnam
- Owner: Vietnam Ministry of Public Security
- Capacity: 60,000
- Surface: Grass

Construction
- Groundbreaking: 19 October 2025; 13 months ago
- Opened: March 2027; 4 months' time

PVF Hưng Yên Stadium (Vietnamese: Sân vận động PVF Hưng Yên), simply known as PVF Stadium, is an under-construction football stadium in located in Hưng Yên, Vietnam. It is located within the PVF Youth Football Training Center. With 60,000 seats, it will become the largest stadium in Vietnam when completed.

== History ==
The PVF Youth Football Training Center was constructed by Vingroup and inaugurated in 2017. Its main stadium, also named PVF Stadium has a 4,500-seated capacity.

To expand its training facilities and professional competition capabilities, the Ministry of Public Security launched a project to expand the football complex and construct a new large stadium. The groundbreaking ceremony of the new PVF Stadium took place on 19 October 2025. Vinhomes served as the main contractor for the project. The PVF Youth Football Training Center is expected to be extended from 22 to 92-hectare.

In September 2026, The 8,600-tonne steel dome roof of PVF Stadium was successfully lifted into place.

In October 2026, the Minister of Public Security Lương Tam Quang announced that three European football clubs Manchester United, AC Milan and Inter Milan had accepted invitations to participate in a friendly tournament, as part of the inauguration of PVF Hưng Yên Stadium.

== Design ==
The stadium will consist of four enclosed stands with a total capacity of 60,000 seats. VIP rooms, a press conference room, a broadcasting control centre and ancillary facilities are located in Stands A and B.

The stadium will feature an automatically retractable steel dome roof weighing approximately 8,600 tonnes, with an arched beam spanning 373 metres. The roof is covered with a polytetrafluoroethylene (PTFE) membrane designed to provide thermal insulation. It can be opened or closed in 12 to 20 minutes.

The playing field will use a hybrid turf system combining natural grass with synthetic fibres for reinforcement. The modular playing surface can be removed to accommodate concerts and other sporting events while preserving the grass pitch for football matches.
