= Hoàng Văn Toản =

Vietnamese footballer (born 2001)

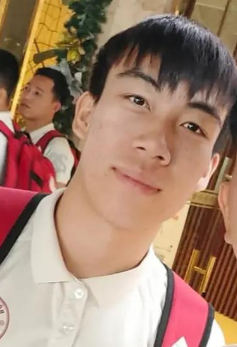
- Văn Toản in 2025

Personal information
- Birth name: Hoàng Văn Toản
- Date of birth: 1 April 2001 (age 25)
- Place of birth: Cao Lộc, Lạng Sơn, Vietnam
- Height: 1.75 m (5 ft 9 in)
- Positions: Defensive midfielder; left back

Team information
- Current team: Công An Hà Nội
- Number: 12

Youth career
- 2017–2020: Công An Nhân Dân

Senior career*
Years	Team	Apps	(Gls)
2021–	Công An Hà Nội	84	(1)

International career^{‡}
2022–2024	Vietnam U23	8	(1)
2023	Vietnam	3	(0)
Medal record
Men's football
Representing Vietnam
AFF U-23 Championship
Winner	Cambodia 2022	Team
- * Club domestic league appearances and goals as of 7 June 2026 ‡ National team caps and goals as of 20 June 2023

Hoàng Văn Toản (born 1 April 2001) is a Vietnamese professional footballer who plays as a defensive midfielder or left back for V.League 1 club Công An Hà Nội.

== Club career ==
Văn Toản began his youth career in the Công An Nhân Dân youth academy. He was promoted to the first team in 2021 and made his debut in the same season. Văn Toản was part of the Công An Nhân Dân team that won the 2022 V.League 2. The club changed its name into Công An Hà Nội for the 2023 season. and released several players from the old squad. Văn Toản was kept by the club and became an important substitute player. He scored his first career goal on 5 June 2023, against league leader Thanh Hóa. He made a total of 14 league appearances during the season as Công An Hà Nội managed to win the title.

== International career ==
=== Vietnam U23 ===
Văn Toản was included in Vietnam U23 squad for the 2022 AFF U-23 Championship. Văn Toản made only one appearance during the tournament, playing the last 30 minutes during the final match against Thailand U23.

=== Vietnam ===
In June 2023, Văn Toản received his first national senior team called up. He made his international debut on 20 June 2023 against Syria during a friendly game in Nam Định.

== Honours ==
Công An Hà Nội

- V.League 1: 2023, 2025–26
- V.League 2: 2022
- Vietnamese National Cup: 2024–25
- Vietnamese Super Cup: 2025, 2026
- ASEAN Club Championship runner-up: 2024–25

Vietnam U23

- AFF U-23 Championship: 2022
