= Vitão (footballer, born 1994) =

Brazilian footballer

Personal information
- Full name: Vitor Hugo Rosa Nascimento
- Date of birth: 12 August 1994 (age 32)
- Place of birth: Ribeirão Preto, Brazil
- Height: 1.88 m (6 ft 2 in)
- Position: Midfielder

Team information
- Current team: Bac Ninh
- Number: 8

Senior career*
Years	Team	Apps	(Gls)
2015	Heliópolis	4	(0)
2020	Batatais	15	(1)
2020	Paranavaí	7	(0)
2021	Comercial RP	14	(0)
2021	→ Artsul (loan)	12	(0)
2022	Plaza Colonia	12	(0)
2022	Comercial RP	0	(0)
2022	Duque de Caxias	8	(0)
2023	Esportivo	1	(0)
2023	Gáucho	11	(0)
2023	Tupy	8	(2)
2023–2024	Itabaiana	16	(0)
2024–2026	Cong An Hanoi	23	(1)
2026–	Bac Ninh	1	(0)
- * Club domestic league appearances and goals as of 6 September 2026

Vitor Hugo Rosa Nascimento (born 12 August 1994), commonly known as Vitão, is a Brazilian professional footballer who plays as a midfielder for V.League 1 club Bac Ninh.

== Club career ==
In January 2021, Vitão joined Uruguayan Primera División side Plaza Colonia, signing a contract until 2028. His first appearance for the team was in the 2022 Supercopa Uruguaya, where his team was defeated 0–1 by Peñarol. After 6 months at the club, he returned to Comercial RP.

In November 2023, Vitão signed for Série D club Itabaiana. He contributed to help the team finish 4th in the 2024 Série D, thus help the club gain a historical promotion to Série C.

In August 2024, Vitão moved to Vietnam, signing for V.League 1 side Cong An Hanoi. He was an important starter for the club in the 2024–25 ASEAN Club Championship, appearing in all games in the competition, including the finals as Cong An Hanoi finish as runners-up.

In August 2026, Vitão joined newly promoted V.League 1 side Bac Ninh.

== Honours ==
Cong An Hanoi

- V.League 1: 2025–26
- Vietnamese National Cup: 2024–25
- Vietnamese Super Cup: 2025
- ASEAN Club Championship: runner-up 2024-25
