= Trương Văn Thiết =

Vietnamese footballer (born 1995)

Personal information
- Full name: Trương Văn Thiết
- Date of birth: 7 June 1995 (age 31)
- Place of birth: Thanh Hóa, Vietnam
- Height: 1.77 m (5 ft 10 in)
- Position: Center-back

Team information
- Current team: Bắc Ninh (on loan from Công An Hà Nội)
- Number: 36

Youth career
- 2010–2016: Viettel

Senior career*
Years	Team	Apps	(Gls)
2016–2023	Viettel	75	(0)
2023–	Công An Hà Nội	10	(0)
2025	→ Quy Nhơn Bình Định (loan)	8	(0)
2025–	→ Bắc Ninh (loan)	11	(1)

International career
2013–2014	Vietnam U19	6	(0)
- * Club domestic league appearances and goals as of 17 May 2026

Trương Văn Thiết (born 7 June 1995) is a Vietnamese professional footballer who plays as a center-back for V.League 2 club Bắc Ninh, on loan from V.League 1 club Công An Hà Nội.

== Club career ==
Born in Thanh Hóa, Văn Thiết was a youth product of Viettel. He was part of the Viettel team that won the 2020 V.League 1, but only appeared in 8 games during that season.

In September 2023, after his contract with Viettel terminated, Văn Thiết joined their rival Công An Hà Nội, signing a two-year contract.

== International career ==
Văn Thiết took part in the 2013 AFF U-19 Youth Championship with Vietnam U19 and scored 1 goal during the tournament as Vietnam finished as runners-up.

In July 2021, Văn Thiết received his first call up to the Vietnam national team for the 2022 FIFA World Cup qualification games against Saudi Arabia and Australia.

== Honours ==
Viettel

- V.League 2: 2018
- V.League 1: 2020

Vietnam U19

- AFF U-19 Youth Championship runner-up: 2013
