= Filip Nguyen =

Vietnamese footballer

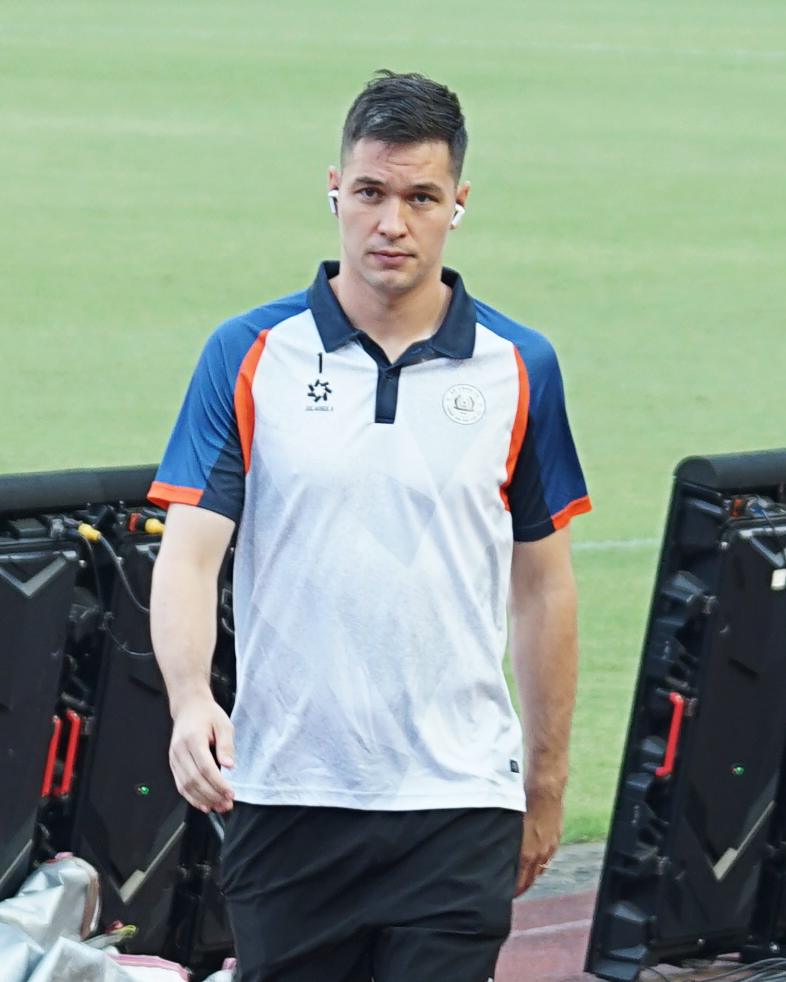
- Filip in 2026

Personal information
- Full name: Filip Nguyen
- Date of birth: 14 September 1992 (age 34)
- Place of birth: Prague, Czechoslovakia
- Height: 1.92 m (6 ft 4 in)
- Position: Goalkeeper

Team information
- Current team: Công An Hà Nội
- Number: 1

Youth career
- 2009–2011: Sparta Prague

Senior career*
Years	Team	Apps	(Gls)
2011–2014	Sparta Prague	0	(0)
2011–2012	→ Loko Vltavín (loan)	0	(0)
2014–2016	SK Union 2013	22	(0)
2016–2018	Vlašim	45	(0)
2018–2022	Slovan Liberec	78	(0)
2021–2022	→ Slovácko (loan)	26	(0)
2022–2023	Slovácko	34	(0)
2023–	Công An Hà Nội	86	(0)

International career^{‡}
2024–	Vietnam	12	(0)
Medal record
Men's football
Representing Vietnam
ASEAN Championship
Winner	ASEAN 2024
- * Club domestic league appearances and goals as of 7 November 2026 ‡ National team caps and goals as of 31 March 2026

Filip Nguyen (Nguyễn Filip; born 14 September 1992) is a professional footballer who plays as a goalkeeper for V.League 1 club Công An Hà Nội. Born in Czechoslovakia, he plays for the Vietnam national team.

== Club career ==
Filip played youth football with Loko Vltavín and Sparta Prague, joining the latter in 2012. On 20 October 2013, Filip appeared in the Sparta first-team squad for the first-team, being an unused substitute for a Czech First League home win over city rivals Dukla Prague. He departed the club in 2015 to play for SK Union Čelákovice. 2016 saw Nguyen complete a move to Czech National Football League side Vlašim. He made his professional debut for Vlašim v. Karviná on 26 March. Forty-two appearances followed across his first three seasons. In February 2018, Slovan Liberec completed the signing of Nguyen; signing until 2021. In the 2022–23 Czech First League, Filip was the goalkeeper with the most clean sheets.

=== Công An Hà Nội ===
On 28 June 2023, Filip signed for V.League 1 club Công An Hà Nội on a three-year contract. Filip made his league debut for the club on 2 July 2023, in a 0–1 loss against SHB Đà Nẵng at Hòa Xuân Stadium. His first season with the Police team ended in success, as they won the V.League 1 title.

== International career ==
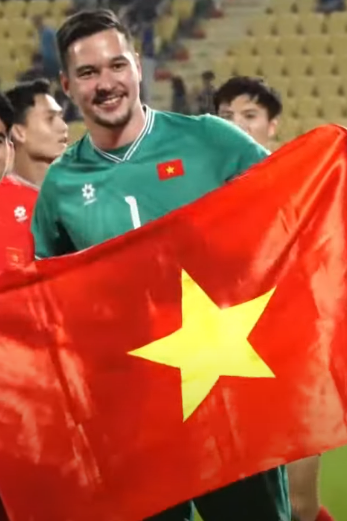
Filip celebrating the 2024 ASEAN Championship title with Vietnam national team.

Filip is eligible to play for either the Czech Republic or Vietnam at international level.

In July 2019, it was reported that Filip was in the process of becoming naturalized as a Vietnamese citizen, which would allow him to represent the country's national team for the succeeding 2022 FIFA World Cup qualifiers.

In September 2020, Filip received his first call-up to the Czech Republic national team for their UEFA Nations League match against Scotland on 7 September. Due to positive SARS-CoV-2 tests in the previous Czech squad, all players and the coaching staff which faced Slovakia on 4 September had to be replaced.

On 6 December 2023, Filip announced on his Facebook page that he had successfully completed his Vietnamese naturalization, thus making him eligible to play for Vietnam.

On 25 December 2023, Filip was selected in Vietnam's 34-man provisional squad for the 2023 AFC Asian Cup, and later made the final squad. He made his first senior international appearance against Kyrgyzstan in a 1–2 friendly defeat on 9 January 2024 in preparation for the tournament. Filip played in all of Vietnam's three matches at the 2023 AFC Asian Cup finals.

== Personal life ==
Filip was born in Prague to a Vietnamese father and a Czech mother. His father is from Haiphong.

Filip married his long-term girlfriend Aneta Ngova in August 2021. She also is of Vietnamese and Czech descent. The couple have two children, a son and a daughter.

== Career statistics ==
=== Club ===
As of match played 19 November 2026

Appearances and goals by club, season and competition
Club	Season	League			National cup (Note: Includes Czech Cup, Vietnamese Cup)		Continental		Other		Total	
Club	Season	Division	Apps	Goals	Apps	Goals	Apps	Goals	Apps	Goals	Apps	Goals
Sparta Prague	2012–13	First League	0	0	0	0	0	0	0	0	0	0
Sparta Prague	2013–14	First League	0	0	0	0	0	0	—		0	0
Sparta Prague	Total		0	0	0	0	0	0	0	0	0	0
SK Union 2013	2014–15	Bohemian Football League	3	0	0	0	—		—		3	0
SK Union 2013	2015–16	Bohemian Football League	19	0	2	0	—		—		21	0
SK Union 2013	Total		22	0	2	0	—		—		24	0
Vlašim	2015–16	National Football League	2	0	0	0	—		—		2	0
Vlašim	2016–17	National Football League	26	0	1	0	—		—		27	0
Vlašim	2017–18	National Football League	15	0	1	0	—		—		16	0
Vlašim	Total		43	0	2	0	—		—		45	0
Slovan Liberec	2017–18	First League	4	0	1	0	—		—		3	0
Slovan Liberec	2018–19	First League	26	0	4	0	—		—		30	0
Slovan Liberec	2019–20	First League	32	0	1	0	—		1 (Note: Appearance in the Czech First League Europa League play-offs)	0	34	0
Slovan Liberec	2020–21	First League	16	0	2	0	7 (Note: Appearances in UEFA Europa League)	0	—		25	0
Slovan Liberec	Total		78	0	8	0	7	0	1	0	94	0
Slovácko	2021–22	First League	26	0	2	0	2 (Note: Appearances in UEFA Conference League)	0	—		30	0
Slovácko	2022–23	First League	34	0	3	0	9 (Note: Two appearances in UEFA Europa League, seven appearances in UEFA Conference League)	0	—		46	0
Slovácko	Total		60	0	5	0	11	0	—		76	0
Công An Hà Nội	2023	V.League 1	8	0	1	0	—		—		9	0
Công An Hà Nội	2023–24	V.League 1	25	0	2	0	—		1 (Note: Appearance in Vietnamese Super Cup)	0	28	0
Công An Hà Nội	2024–25	V.League 1	24	0	4	0	—		8 (Note: Appearances in ASEAN Club Championship)	0	36	0
Công An Hà Nội	2025–26	V.League 1	22	0	1	0	7 (Note: Appearances in AFC Champions League Two)	0	5 (Note: One appearance in Vietnamese Super Cup, four appearances in ASEAN Club Championship)	0	35	0
Công An Hà Nội	2026–27	V.League 1	7	0	0	0	5 (Note: Appearances in AFC Champions League Elite)	0	3 (Note: One appearance in Vietnamese Super Cup, two appearances in ASEAN Club Championship)	0	15	0
Công An Hà Nội	Total		86	0	8	0	12	0	17	0	123	0
Career total			289	0	25	0	30	0	18	0	362	0

=== International ===
As of match played 31 March 2026

Appearances and goals by national team and year
National team	Year	Apps	Goals
Vietnam	2024	11	0
Vietnam	2025	1	0
Vietnam	2026	1	0
Total		13	0

== Honours ==
Slovácko

- Czech Cup: 2021–22

Công An Hà Nội

- V.League 1: 2023, 2025–26
- Vietnamese National Cup: 2024–25
- Vietnamese Super Cup: 2025, 2026
- ASEAN Club Championship runner-up: 2024–25

Vietnam

- ASEAN Championship: 2024

Individual

- V.League 1 Team of the Season: 2025–26

== See also ==
- List of Vietnam footballers born outside Vietnam
