= China (footballer, born 1996) =

Brazilian footballer

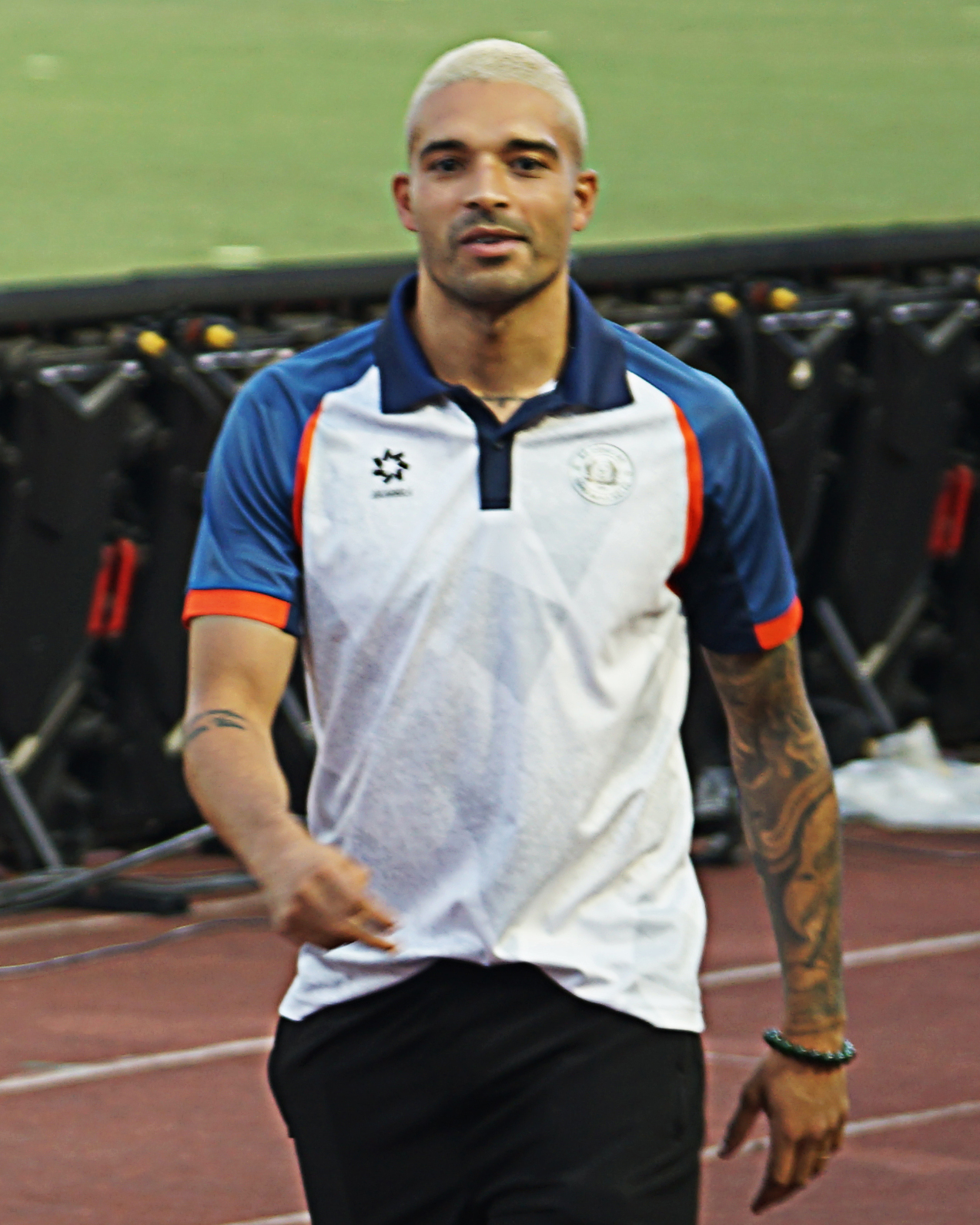
- China in 2026

Personal information
- Full name: Rogério Alves dos Santos
- Date of birth: 2 August 1996 (age 30)
- Place of birth: São Paulo, Brazil
- Height: 1.79 m (5 ft 10 1/2 in)
- Position: Winger

Team information
- Current team: FC Yelimay
- Number: 89

Youth career
- Juventus-SP

Senior career*
Years	Team	Apps	(Gls)
2017	Karpaty Lviv	2	(0)
2019–2023	FC Lviv	63	(8)
2022	→ Aktobe (loan)	25	(5)
2023	Dibba Al Fujairah	8	(0)
2023	Aktobe	10	(5)
2024	FC Yelimay	21	(4)
2025	Thep Xanh Nam Dinh	0	(0)
2025–2026	Cong An Hanoi	10	(5)
2026–	FC Yelimay	9	(1)
- * Club domestic league appearances and goals as of 1 November 2026

Rogério Alves dos Santos (born 2 August 1996), commonly known as China, is a Brazilian professional footballer who plays as a winger for Kazakh club FC Yelimay.

== Career ==
=== Karpaty Lviv ===
In March 2017, China signed a five-year deal with Ukrainian side FC Karpaty Lviv. He made his debut in the Ukrainian Premier League against FC Vorskla Poltava on 21 May.

=== FC Lviv ===
China made his league debut for Lviv against FC Oleksandriya on 13 April 2019. He scored his first goal for the club against Vorskla Poltava on 10 August 2019, scoring in the 59th minute.

=== Loan to Aktobe ===
China made his league debut for Aktobe against Kairat on 6 March 2022. He scored his first goal for the club against Astana on 26 June 2022, scoring in the 33 minute.

=== Dibba Al Fujairah ===
China made his league debut for Dibba Al Fujairah against Al Dhafra on 23 January 2023.

=== Second spell at Aktobe ===
China scored on his debut for Aktobe against FK Kaspiy Aktau on 30 July 2023, scoring in the 50th minute.

=== Yelimay Semey ===
China made his debut for Yelimay Semey against Atyrau on 2 March 2024. He scored his first goal for the club against Tobol on 6 March 2024, scoring a penalty in the 53rd minute.

=== Nam Dinh ===
On 4 January 2025, China signed for V.League 1 side Thep Xanh Nam Dinh.

== Honours ==
Cong An Hanoi

- V.League 1: 2025–26
- Vietnamese Super Cup: 2025

Individual

- Ukrainian Premier League player of the Month: 2020–21 (March)
