= Trần Đình Trọng =

Vietnamese footballer

- Trần Đình Trọng in 2023

Personal information
- Full name: Trần Đình Trọng
- Date of birth: 25 April 1997 (age 29)
- Place of birth: Gia Lâm, Hanoi, Vietnam
- Height: 1.75 m (5 ft 9 in)
- Position: Center-back

Team information
- Current team: Công An Hà Nội
- Number: 21

Youth career
- 2010–2015: Hà Nội

Senior career*
Years	Team	Apps	(Gls)
2014–2015	→ Công An Nhân Dân (loan)	14	(0)
2015–2017	→ Sài Gòn (loan)	46	(0)
2018–2022	Hà Nội	25	(0)
2022–2024	Quy Nhơn Bình Định	34	(0)
2024–	Công An Hà Nội	40	(0)

International career^{‡}
2017–2018	Vietnam U20	4	(0)
2017–2020	Vietnam U23	20	(0)
2017–	Vietnam	16	(0)
Medal record
Men's football
Representing Vietnam
AFC U-23 Championship
Runner-up	China 2018
AFF Championship
Winner	ASEAN 2018
- * Club domestic league appearances and goals as of 7 June 2026 ‡ National team caps and goals as of 31 March 2026

Trần Đình Trọng (born 25 April 1997) is a Vietnamese professional footballer who plays as a center-back for V.League 1 club Công An Hà Nội and the Vietnam national team.

== Club career ==
A youth product of the Hà Nội Academy, Đình Trọng began his career at Công An Nhân Dân in the V.League 2, before being transferred to Sài Gòn, a satellite club of Hà Nội. After winning the 2015 V.League 2 with Sài Gòn, Đình Trọng returned to Hà Nội in the V.League 1. There, he was part of the Hà Nội squad that won back-to-back V.League 1 titles in 2018 and 2019.

Following these accomplishments, Đình Trọng regularly sat out the football field for a long period due to injuries, resulting on his departure from Hà Nội in 2022, signing for Quy Nhơn Bình Định. In the 2023–24, he finished as V.League 1 runners-up with in Quy Nhơn Bình Đinh as an important starter player.

On 27 July 2024, Đình Trọng joined Công An Hà Nội.

== International career ==
Considered as one of the most promising Vietnamese defenders after the 2017 FIFA U-20 World Cup, Đình Trọng accomplished several successes in his early career. He played a crucial role on Vietnam U23's runner-up campaign at the 2018 AFC U-23 Championship, and later achieved the 2018 AFF Championship title with Vietnam national team.

In March 2026, Đình Trọng was called up by head coach Kim Sang-Sik to the Vietnam national team for the first time in after 4 years, for the 2027 AFC Asian Cup qualification game against Malaysia on 31 March 2026.

== Honours ==
Sài Gòn

- V.League 2: 2015

Hà Nội

- V.League 1: 2018, 2019
- Vietnamese National Cup: 2019, 2020
- Vietnamese Super Cup: 2019, 2020, 2021

Công An Hà Nội

- V.League 1: 2025–26
- Vietnamese National Cup: 2024–25
- Vietnamese Super Cup: 2025

Vietnam U23/Olympic

- AFC U-23 Championship runner-up: 2018
- Asian Games Fourth place: 2018
- VFF Cup: 2018

Vietnam

- AFF Championship: 2018
- VFF Cup: 2022
- King's Cup runner-up: 2019

Individual

- AFF Championship Best Eleven: 2018
- ASEAN Club Championship All-Star XI: 2024–25
