= PVF Youth Football Training Center =

Stadium in Hưng Yên, Vietnam

Coordinates: 20°55′40″N 105°56′44″E

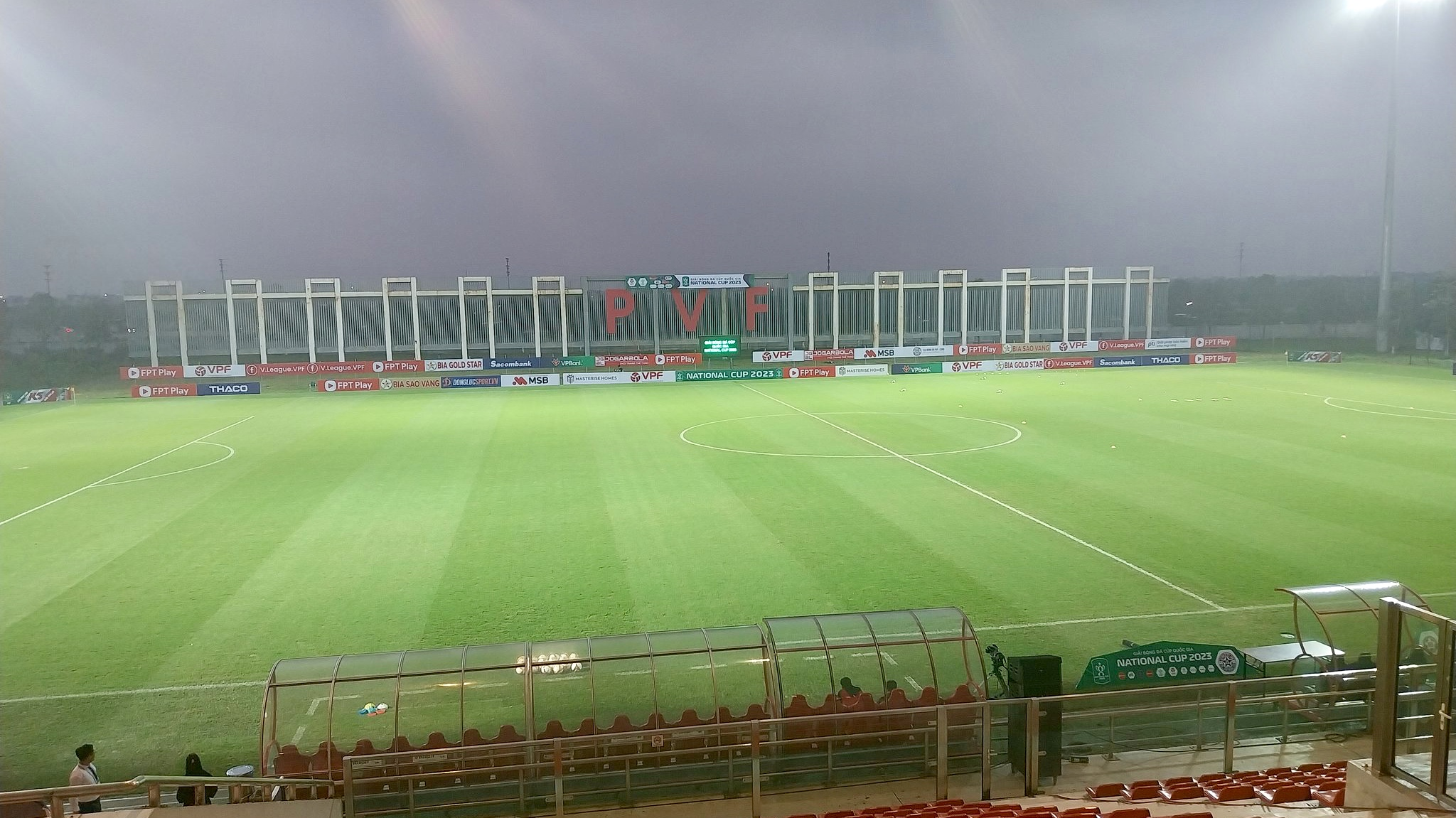
- Interactive map of PVF Youth Football Training Center
- Address: Nghĩa Trụ Commune, Hưng Yên, Vietnam
- Owner: Vietnam Ministry of Public Security
- Capacity: 4,500
- Surface: Grass

Construction
- Opened: November 2017; 8 years ago

Tenants
- Cong An Nhan Dan; Hung Yen; PVF Football Academy

PVF Youth Football Training Center (Vietnamese: Trung tâm Đào tạo Bóng đá Trẻ PVF), is a 22-hectare sporting complex located in Hưng Yên, Vietnam It is currently used mostly for football matches and is the home stadium and training center of Cong An Nhan Dan, Hung Yen and PVF Football Academy. Its main stadium PVF Stadium holds 4,500 people.

== History ==
The PVF Youth Football Training Center was constructed by Vingroup and inaugurated in 2017. The facility comprises a system of football pitches, a sports science and healthcare complex, and accommodation facilities for players and staff. It includes seven football pitches: one main stadium, the 4,500-seated PVF Stadium, and six standard 11-a-side fields, including one indoor football pitch.

The center also operates a sports science complex equipped with modern training and rehabilitation technologies, as well as a swimming pool system that includes one main pool and three therapy pools. It is also equipped with a 360s simulation training system and PlayerTek performance monitoring technology. Accommodation is provided in an eight-story dormitory complex that features a canteen, auditorium, library, cinema room, tactical classrooms, and recreational sports areas.

== Future expansion ==
PVF Stadium
- Interactive map of PVF Stadium
- Location: Hưng Yên, Vietnam
- Capacity: 60,000

Construction
- Groundbreaking: 2025

In October 2025, the construction of a new PVF Stadium was launched, located close to the current PVF Stadium. The stadium will approximately have 60,000 seats and retractable roof.

A 4,500-capacity multi-purpose sports arena is also constructed next to stadium.

The PVF Youth Football Training Center is expected to be extended from 22 to 92-hectare.
