= 2025 Vietnamese Super Cup =

Siêu Cúp bóng đá Quốc gia 2024/25 – Cúp THACO
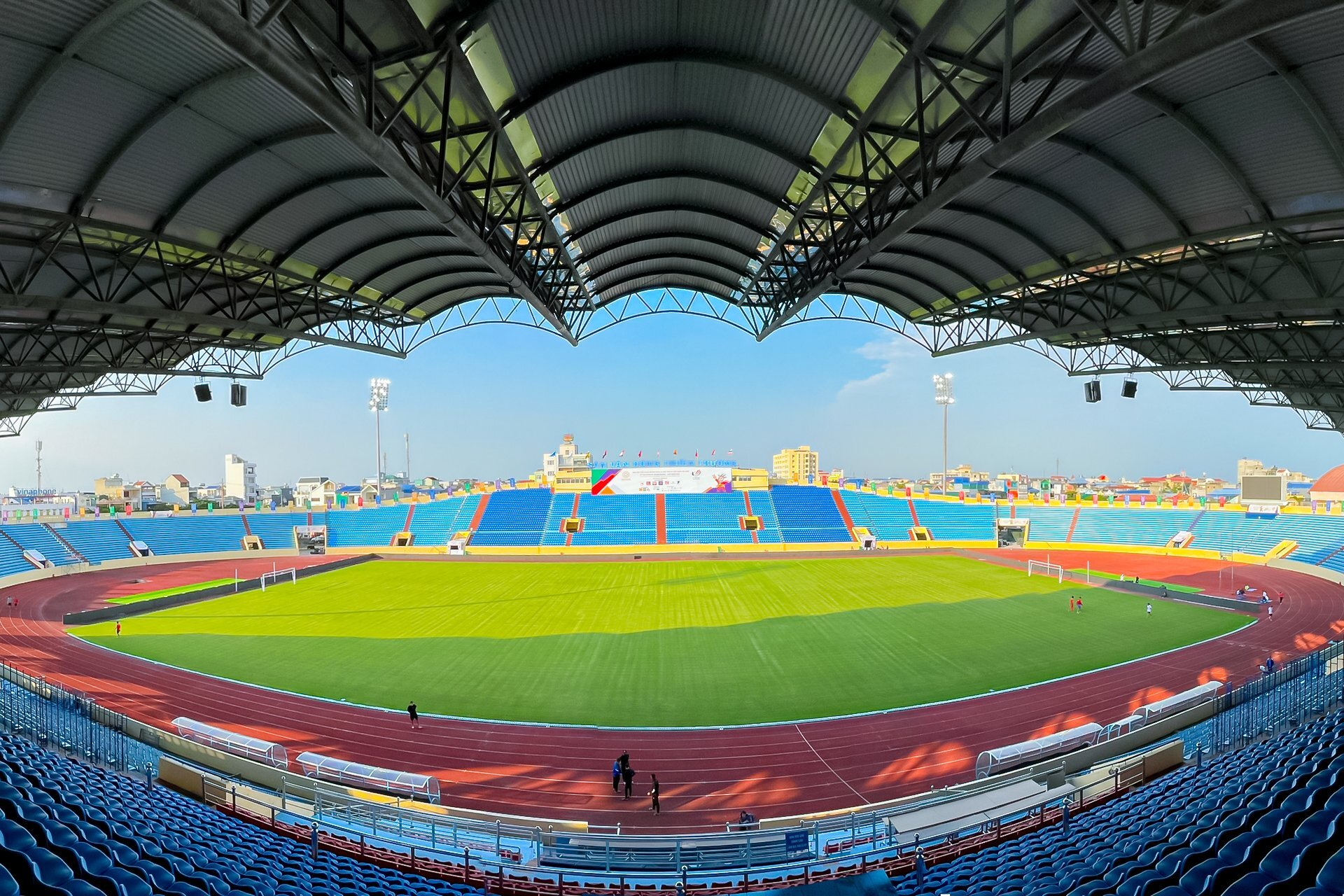
- The match took place at Thiên Trường Stadium
Thep Xanh Nam Dinh	Cong An Hanoi
2	3
- Date: 9 August 2025
- Venue: Thiên Trường Stadium, Ninh Bình
- Man of the Match: Léo Artur (Cong An Hanoi)
- Referee: Mai Xuân Hùng
- Attendance: 15,000

The 2025 Vietnamese Super Cup (Vietnamese: Siêu Cúp bóng đá Quốc gia 2025), also known as 2024–25 Vietnamese Super Cup - THACO Cup (Vietnamese: Siêu Cúp bóng đá Quốc gia 2024/25 – Cúp THACO) was the 26th Vietnamese Super Cup, an annual association football match contested by the winners of the previous season's V.League 1 and Vietnamese Cup competitions. It was played at Thiên Trường Stadium in Ninh Bình on 9 August 2025, and was featured the 2024–25 V.League 1 winners Thep Xanh Nam Dinh and the 2024–25 Vietnamese Cup winners Cong An Hanoi.

Cong An Hanoi beat the defending champions Thep Xanh Nam Dinh 3–2 on full-time, winning their first Super Cup title.

== Background ==
Thep Xanh Nam Dinh and Cong An Hanoi qualified for the 2025 Vietnamese Super Cup as the winners of the 2024–25 V.League 1 and the 2024–25 Vietnamese Cup, respectively. It will be the 11th meeting between the two sides, and the first appearance for Cong An Hanoi in a Super Cup match. Thep Xanh Nam Dinh have previously appeared in 2 Super Cup matches, winning 1 title, and appearing most recently in the 2024 edition, where they beat Dong A Thanh Hoa 3–0 at the Thiên Trường Stadium.

== Match ==
=== Details ===
9 August 2025
18:00 UTC+7

Thep Xanh Nam Dinh	2–3	Cong An Hanoi
Hudlin 54', 90+15' (pen.)	Report	Alan 38'; Artur 90+3'; Nguyễn Đình Bắc 90+8'

Thiên Trường Stadium, Ninh Bình
Attendance: 15,000
Referee: Mai Xuân Hùng

Thep Xanh Nam Dinh	Cong An Hanoi

GK	26	(Vietnam) Trần Nguyên Mạnh
LB	17	(Vietnam) Nguyễn Văn Vĩ	(substituted off) 81'
CB	5	(Vietnam) Đặng Văn Tới
CB	32	(Vietnam) Ngô Đức Huy
RB	13	(Vietnam) Trần Văn Kiên
CM	72	(Brazil) Rômulo
CM	10	(Brazil) Caio César	(substituted off) 52'
LM	88	(Vietnam) Lý Công Hoàng Anh	(substituted off) 66'	(yellow card) 8'
AM	11	(Vietnam) Nguyễn Tuấn Anh	(substituted off) 66'
RM	39	(Vietnam) Lâm Ti Phông		(yellow card) 33'
CF	35	(Brazil) Brenner Marlos	(substituted off) 81'
Substitutes:
GK	82	(Vietnam) Trần Liêm Điều
DF	3	(Vietnam) Dương Thanh Hào
DF	4	(Brazil) Lucas Alves
DF	93	(France) Kevin Pham Ba	(substituted on) 66'
MF	8	(Vietnam) Nguyễn Đình Sơn
MF	16	(Vietnam) Trần Văn Công	(substituted on) 66'
MF	27	(Vietnam) Trần Ngọc Sơn	(substituted on) 81'
FW	12	(Palestine) Mahmoud Eid	(substituted on) 81'
FW	37	(England) Kyle Hudlin	(substituted on) 52'	(yellow card) 57'
Manager:
(Vietnam) Vũ Hồng Việt

GK	1	(Vietnam) Nguyễn Filip		(yellow card) 90+7'
CB	38	(France) Leygley Adou		(yellow card) 60'
CB	68	(Vietnam) Bùi Hoàng Việt Anh
CB	21	(Vietnam) Trần Đình Trọng	(substituted off) 90+4'	(yellow card) 44'
LM	7	(Vietnam) Cao Pendant Quang Vinh	(substituted off) 52'
CM	8	(Brazil) Vitão	(substituted off) 69'
CM	11	(Vietnam) Lê Phạm Thành Long		(yellow card) 90+16'
RM	20	(Vietnam) Phan Văn Đức	(substituted off) 69'
LW	10	(Brazil) Léo Artur	(substituted off) 90+4'
CF	72	(Brazil) Alan Grafite
RW	19	(Vietnam) Nguyễn Quang Hải
Substitutes:
GK	32	(Vietnam) Vũ Tuyên Quang
DF	2	(Vietnam) Phạm Lý Đức	(substituted on) 90+4'
DF	3	(Brazil) Hugo Gomes	(substituted on) 90+4'	(yellow card) 90+13'
DF	22	(Vietnam) Phạm Minh Phúc
MF	12	(Vietnam) Hoàng Văn Toản	(substituted on) 69'
MF	15	(Vietnam) Bùi Xuân Thịnh
FW	9	(Vietnam) Nguyễn Đình Bắc	(substituted on) 69'	(yellow card) 90+9'
FW	30	(Brazil) Rogério Alves
FW	88	(Vietnam) Lê Văn Đô	(substituted on) 52'
Manager:
(Brazil) Alexandré Pölking (yellow card) 81'

Man of the Match:
Léo Artur (Cong An Hanoi)

Assistant referees:
Nguyễn Lâm Minh Đăng
Nguyễn Thành Sơn
Fourth official:
Hoàng Thanh Bình
Reserve assistant referee:
Võ Minh Trí
Video assistant referee:
Đỗ Khánh Nam
Assistant video assistant referee:
Nguyễn Mạnh Hải

Match rules

- 90 minutes
- Penalty shoot-out if scores still level
- Nine named substitutes, of which six may be used

=== Statistics ===
Statistics	Thep Xanh Nam Dinh	Cong An Hanoi
Goal scored	2	3
Total shots	12	12
Shots on target	3	6
Total passes	399	409
Ball possession	55,6%	64,5%
Corner kicks	2	5
Free kicks	11	12
Fouls committed	12	15
Offsides	0	1
Yellow cards	3	7
Red cards	0	0
Source: FStatsAI (FPT)

== Broadcasting ==
The match was broadcast on television in Vietnam on FPT Play, TV360 and MyTV, and its on-demand streaming counterparts on YouTube channels on, V.League, VPF Media and Tiền Phong.
