= 2025 ASEAN Club Championship final =

Football match

Cong An Hanoi	Buriram United
(Vietnam)	(Thailand)
5	5
- After extra time Buriram United won 3–2 on penalties

First leg
Cong An Hanoi	Buriram United
2	2
- Date: 14 May 2025
- Venue: Hàng Đẫy Stadium, Hanoi
- Referee: Kim Hee-gon (South Korea)
- Attendance: 13,879

Second leg
Buriram United	Cong An Hanoi
3	3
- Date: 21 May 2025
- Venue: Chang Arena, Buriram
- Referee: Koji Takasaki (Japan)
- Attendance: 31,290

The 2025 ASEAN Club Championship final was the final match of the 2024–25 ASEAN Club Championship, the 3rd season of Southeast Asia's football tournament organized by the ASEAN Football Federation (AFF), and the first since its revival.

== Teams ==
Team	Previous finals appearances (bold indicates winners)
(Vietnam) Cong An Hanoi	None
(Thailand) Buriram United	None

== Venue ==
The 2 venues were pre-determined on rotation basis.

== Route to the final ==
Note: In all results below, the score of the finalist is given first (H: home; A: away).

Cong An Hanoi (Vietnam)				Round	(Thailand) Buriram United			
Opponent	Result			Group stage	Opponent	Result		
(Thailand) Buriram United	2–1 (H)			Matchday 1	(Vietnam) Cong An Hanoi	2–1 (A)		
(Singapore) Lion City Sailors	5–0 (H)			Matchday 2	(Philippines) Kaya–Iloilo	7–0 (H)		
(Philippines) Kaya–Iloilo	1–2 (A)			Matchday 3	(Indonesia) Borneo	4–0 (H)		
(Malaysia) Kuala Lumpur City	2–3 (A)			Matchday 4	(Singapore) Lion City Sailors	0–0 (A)		
(Indonesia) Borneo	3–2 (H)			Matchday 5	(Malaysia) Kuala Lumpur City	1–0 (H)		
**Group B winner**: Pos / Team / Pld / Pts; **1** / (Vietnam) Cong An Hanoi / **5** / **15**; 2 / (Thailand) Buriram United / 5 / **10**; 3 / (Malaysia) Kuala Lumpur City / 5 / **6**; 4 / (Indonesia) Borneo / 5 / **6**; 5 / (Singapore) Lion City Sailors / 5 / **4**; Source: ASEAN United FC				Final standings	**Group B runner-up**: Pos / Team / Pld / Pts; 1 / (Vietnam) Cong An Hanoi / 5 / **15**; **2** / (Thailand) Buriram United / **5** / **10**; 3 / (Malaysia) Kuala Lumpur City / 5 / **6**; 4 / (Indonesia) Borneo / 5 / **6**; 5 / (Singapore) Lion City Sailors / 5 / **4**; Source: ASEAN United FC			
Opponent	Agg.	1st leg	2nd leg	Knockout stage	Opponent	Agg.	1st leg	2nd leg
(Indonesia) PSM Makassar	1–2	1–0 (A)	2–0 (H)	Semi-finals	(Thailand) BG Pathum United	3–1	3–1 (H)	0–0 (A)

== Match details ==
Team 1	Agg.	Team 2	1st leg	2nd leg
Cong An Hanoi (Vietnam)	5–5 (2–3 p)	**(Thailand) Buriram United**	2–2	3–3 (a.e.t.)

14 May 2025
19:30 UTC+7

Cong An Hanoi (Vietnam)	2–2	(Thailand) Buriram United
Léo Artur 18'; Alan 35'	Report	Good 28'; Žulj 79'

Hàng Đẫy Stadium, Hanoi
Attendance: 13,879
Referee: Kim Hee-gon (South Korea)

**Cong An Hanoi**	**Buriram United**

21 May 2025
19:30 UTC+7

Buriram United (Thailand)	3–3 (a.e.t.)	(Vietnam) Cong An Hanoi
Žulj 83'; Lucas 90+8'; Bissoli 105' (pen.)	Report	Pendant 15'; Léo Artur 39' (pen.); Alan 118'
Penalties
Žulj (penalty scored); Lucas (penalty scored); Boakye (penalty missed); Phitiwat (penalty scored); Dougall (penalty missed)	3–2	(penalty scored) Lê Văn Đô; (penalty missed) Pendant; (penalty missed) Gomes; (penalty scored) Alan; (penalty missed) Bùi Hoàng Việt Anh

Chang Arena, Buriram
Attendance: 31,290
Referee: Koji Takasaki (Japan)

**Buriram United**	**Cong An Hanoi**
