= 2024–25 ASEAN Club Championship knockout stage =

The 2024–25 ASEAN Club Championship knockout stage were played from 2 April to 21 May 2025. A total of 4 teams will compete in the knockout stage to decide the champions of the 2024–25 ASEAN Club Championship.

== Qualified teams ==
The following teams advanced from the group stage:

Group	Winners	Runners-up
A	(Thailand) BG Pathum United	(Indonesia) PSM Makassar
B	(Vietnam) Cong An Hanoi	(Thailand) Buriram United

== Format ==
In the knockout stage, the 4 teams will play a single-elimination tournament. Each tie will be played on a home-and-away two-legged basis. Extra time and penalty shoot-out will be used to decide the winners if necessary (no away goals rule is being used).

== Schedule ==
The schedule of each round is as follows.

Stage	Round	First leg	Second leg
Knockout stage	Semi-finals	2 April 2025	30 April & 7 May 2025
Knockout stage	Finals	14 May 2025	21 May 2025

== Bracket ==
Semi-finals
A2	(Indonesia) PSM Makassar	1	0	1
B1	(Vietnam) Cong An Hanoi	0	2	2
B2	(Thailand) Buriram United	3	0	3
A1	(Thailand) BG Pathum United	1	0	1

Final
B1	(Vietnam) Cong An Hanoi	2	3	5 (2)
B2	(Thailand) Buriram United (p)	2	3	5 (3)

== Semi-finals ==
=== Summary ===
Team 1	Agg.	Team 2	1st leg	2nd leg
PSM Makassar (Indonesia)	1–2	(Vietnam) Cong An Hanoi	1–0	0–2
Buriram United (Thailand)	3–1	(Thailand) BG Pathum United	3–1	0–0

2 April 2025
20:30 UTC+8

PSM Makassar (Indonesia)	1–0	(Vietnam) Cong An Hanoi
Yuran 80'	Report

Gelora B.J. Habibie Stadium, Parepare
Attendance: 7,176
Referee: Ryo Tanimoto (Japan)
30 April 2025
19:30 UTC+7

Cong An Hanoi (Vietnam)	2–0	(Indonesia) PSM Makassar
Gomes 48'; Bùi Hoàng Việt Anh 60'	Report

Hàng Đẫy Stadium, Hanoi
Attendance: 14,879
Referee: Kim Dae-yong (South Korea)

Cong An Hanoi won 2–1 on aggregate.

2 April 2025
19:30 UTC+7

Buriram United (Thailand)	3–1	(Thailand) BG Pathum United
Supachai 24'; Pansa 57'; Bissoli 74'	Report	Ilhan 54'

Buriram City Stadium, Buriram
Attendance: 10,370
Referee: Choi Hyun-jai (South Korea)
7 May 2025
19:30 UTC+7

BG Pathum United (Thailand)	0–0	(Thailand) Buriram United
	Report

BG Stadium, Pathum Thani
Attendance: 10,651
Referee: Hiroki Kasahara (Japan)

Buriram United won 3–1 on aggregate.

== Final ==
Team 1	Agg.	Team 2	1st leg	2nd leg
Cong An Hanoi (Vietnam)	5–5 (2–3 p)	(Thailand) Buriram United	2–2	3–3 (a.e.t.)

14 May 2025
19:30 UTC+7

Cong An Hanoi (Vietnam)	2–2	(Thailand) Buriram United
Léo Artur 18'; Alan 35'	Report	Good 28'; Žulj 79'

Hàng Đẫy Stadium, Hanoi
Attendance: 13,879
Referee: Kim Hee-gon (South Korea)

21 May 2025
19:30 UTC+7

Buriram United (Thailand)	3–3 (a.e.t.)	(Vietnam) Cong An Hanoi
Žulj 83'; Lucas 90+8'; Bissoli 105' (pen.)	Report	Pendant 15'; Léo Artur 39' (pen.); Alan 118'
Penalties
Žulj (penalty scored); Lucas (penalty scored); Boakye (penalty missed); Phitiwat (penalty scored); Dougall (penalty missed)	3–2	(penalty scored) Lê Văn Đô; (penalty missed) Pendant; (penalty missed) Gomes; (penalty scored) Alan; (penalty missed) Bùi Hoàng Việt Anh

Chang Arena, Buriram
Attendance: 31,290
Referee: Koji Takasaki (Japan)
