= 2024–25 ASEAN Club Championship qualifying play-offs =

ASEAN Football Confederation play-offs

The 2024–25 ASEAN Club Championship qualifying play-offs will take place from 17 to 24 July 2024. A total of 4 clubs from four member associations will compete in the qualifying play-offs to decide two places in the group stage of the 2024–25 ASEAN Club Championship.

== Teams ==
At the draw on 9 May 2024 in Ho Chi Minh City, Vietnam, four teams were drawn into two pairings. Each pair playing home and away on 17 and 24 July 2024.

Pot 1	Pot 2
(Myanmar) Shan United	(Laos) Young Elephants
(Cambodia) Preah Khan Reach Svay Rieng	(Brunei) Kasuka

== Format ==
In the qualifying play-offs, each tie was played as two-legged home-and-away matches. If the aggregate score was tied after two legs, extra time and, if necessary, a penalty shoot-out would be used to decide the winning team.

== Schedule ==
The schedule of the qualifying play-offs is as follows.

Round	Dates
First leg	17 July 2024
Second leg	24 July 2024

== Bracket ==
=== Play-off 1 ===
The winner of play-off 1 will enter into Group A of the competition proper.

Play-off round
(Laos) Young Elephants	2	1	3
(Cambodia) Preah Khan Reach Svay Rieng	3	5	8

=== Play-off 2 ===
The winner of play-off 2 will enter into Group A of the competition proper.

Play-off round
(Brunei) Kasuka	1	1	2
(Myanmar) Shan United	1	3	4

== Play-off round ==
=== Summary ===
Team 1	Agg.	Team 2	1st leg	2nd leg
Young Elephants (Laos)	3–8	(Cambodia) Preah Khan Reach Svay Rieng	2–3	1–5
Kasuka (Brunei)	2–4	(Myanmar) Shan United	1–1	1–3

=== Matches ===
17 July 2024
19:30 UTC+7

Young Elephants (Laos)	2–3	(Cambodia) Preah Khan Reach Svay Rieng
Nishihara 33' (pen.); Makhmudkhozhiev 37'	Report	Gabriel 19'; Cristian 90'; Sosidan 90+4'

New Laos National Stadium, Vientiane
Attendance: 1,061
Referee: Chae Sang-hyeop (South Korea)
24 July 2024
19:00 UTC+7

Preah Khan Reach Svay Rieng (Cambodia)	5–1	(Laos) Young Elephants
Gabriel 39'; Pablo 42', 53', 61', 74'	Report	Nishihara 9' (pen.)

Olympic Stadium, Phnom Penh
Attendance: 10,108
Referee: Hiroki Kasahara (Japan)

Preah Khan Reach Svay Rieng won 8–3 on aggregate.

17 July 2024
20:15 UTC+8

Kasuka (Brunei)	1–1	(Myanmar) Shan United
Taylor 44'	Report	Hein Phyo Win 79'

Hassanal Bolkiah National Stadium, Bandar Seri Begawan
Attendance: 2,300
Referee: Shen Yinhao (China)
24 July 2024
18:00 UTC+6:30

Shan United (Myanmar)	3–1	(Brunei) Kasuka
Efrain 4' (pen.), 44'; Kaung Myat Thu 67'	Report	Willian 79' (pen.)

Thuwunna Stadium, Yangon
Attendance: 1,200
Referee: Kim Dae-yong (South Korea)

Shan United won 4–2 on aggregate.

== See also ==
- 2024 SAFF Club Championship
