= 2024–25 ASEAN Club Championship group stage =

ASEAN Football Federation matches

The 2024–25 ASEAN Club Championship group stage took place from 21 August 2024 to 5 February 2025.

A total of 12 teams will compete in the group stage to decide the 4 places in the knockout stage of the 2024–25 ASEAN Club Championship.

== Draw ==
At the draw on 9 May 2024 in Ho Chi Minh City, Vietnam, twelve teams were drawn into two groups of six. Each group contains two teams each from Pot 1, Pot 2, and Pot 3. Teams from the same association could not be placed in the same group.

According to the law of the state of Terengganu, events are not allowed to be held on Thursday nights. As a result, Terengganu FC and Kuala Lumpur City FC were pre-allocated in positions A2 and B2 respectively, so that no matches would be held in Terengganu on Thursday nights.

Teams with the groups to which they were allocated
Pot 1	Pot 2	Pot 3
(Thailand) Buriram United (B)	(Indonesia) PSM Makassar (A)	(Singapore) Lion City Sailors (B)
(Thailand) BG Pathum United (A)	(Indonesia) Borneo (B)	(Philippines) Kaya–Iloilo (B)
(Malaysia) Kuala Lumpur City (B)	(Vietnam) Cong An Hanoi (B)	(Cambodia) Preah Khan Reach Svay Rieng^{†} (A)
(Malaysia) Terengganu (A)	(Vietnam) Dong A Thanh Hoa (A)	(Myanmar) Shan United^{†} (A)

Note

^{†} Teams whose identity was not known at the time of the draw.

== Format ==
The group stage is a single round-robin format, with the top two teams from each group advancing to the semi-finals.

=== Tiebreakers ===
The teams are ranked according to points (3 points for a win, 1 point for a draw, 0 points for a loss). If tied on points, tiebreakers are applied in the following order:

1. Points in head-to-head matches among tied teams;
2. Goal difference in head-to-head matches among tied teams;
3. Goals scored in head-to-head matches among tied teams;
4. If more than two teams were tied, and after applying all head-to-head criteria above, a subset of teams were still tied, all head-to-head criteria above were reapplied exclusively to this subset of teams;
5. Goal difference in all group matches;
6. Goals scored in all group matches;
7. Penalty shoot-out if only two teams playing each other in the last round of the group are tied;
8. Disciplinary points (yellow card = 1 point, red card as a result of two yellow cards = 3 points, direct red card = 3 points, yellow card followed by direct red card = 4 points);
9. Drawing of lots.

== Schedule ==
The schedule of the group stage is as follows.

Round	Dates
Matchday 1	21–22 August 2024
Matchday 2	25–26 September 2024
Matchday 3	8–9 January 2025
Matchday 4	22–23 January 2025
Matchday 5	5–6 February 2025

== Groups ==
=== Group A ===
Pos	Team	Pld	W	D	L	GF	GA	GD	Pts	Qualification	BGP	PSM	PKS	TNG	DOA	SHU
1	(Thailand) BG Pathum United	5	3	2	0	11	6	+5	11	Advance to Semi-finals			2–1	4–3	1–1	
2	(Indonesia) PSM Makassar	5	3	1	1	8	4	+4	10	Advance to Semi-finals	0–0				3–0	4–3
3	(Cambodia) Preah Khan Reach Svay Rieng	5	2	1	2	8	7	+1	7 (Note: Ranked on head-to-head points: Preah Khan Reach Svay Rieng (3); Terengganu (0).)			0–1				4–2
4	(Malaysia) Terengganu	5	2	1	2	13	9	+4	7			1–0	2–3		2–2	
5	(Vietnam) Dong A Thanh Hoa	5	1	3	1	6	7	−1	6				0–0			3–1
6	(Myanmar) Shan United	5	0	0	5	7	20	−13	0		1–4			0–5		

Source: ASEAN United FC
Rules for classification: Tiebreakers
Notes:
21 August 2024
18:00 UTC+7

Dong A Thanh Hoa (Vietnam)	3–1	(Myanmar) Shan United
Rimario 60'; Yago 72'; Luiz Antônio 87'	Report	Bakayoko 5'

Thanh Hóa Stadium, Thanh Hóa
Attendance: 8,568
Referee: Kim Woo-sung (South Korea)
21 August 2024
19:30 UTC+8

PSM Makassar (Indonesia)	0–0	(Thailand) BG Pathum United
	Report

Batakan Stadium, Balikpapan
Attendance: 799
Referee: Koji Takasaki (Japan)
21 August 2024
21:00 UTC+8

Terengganu (Malaysia)	2–3	(Cambodia) Preah Khan Reach Svay Rieng
Ott 55'; Safawi 90+1' (pen.)	Report	Gabriel 12'; Pablo 16'; Ratanak 86'

Sultan Mizan Zainal Abidin Stadium, Terengganu
Attendance: 5,016
Referee: Wong Wai Lun (Hong Kong)

25 September 2024
19:00 UTC+7

BG Pathum United (Thailand)	2–1	(Cambodia) Preah Khan Reach Svay Rieng
Raniel 30'; Chanathip 63'	Report	Pablo 61'

BG Stadium, Pathum Thani
Attendance: 5,308
Referee: Faisal Al-Balawi (Saudi Arabia)
25 September 2024
21:00 UTC+8

Terengganu (Malaysia)	2–2	(Vietnam) Dong A Thanh Hoa
Akhyar 20'; Ott 39'	Report	Luiz Antônio 45+2'; Ubaidullah 52' (o.g.)

Sultan Mizan Zainal Abidin Stadium, Terengganu
Attendance: 3,145
Referee: Koji Takasaki (Japan)
25 September 2024
19:00 UTC+8

PSM Makassar (Indonesia)	4–3	(Myanmar) Shan United
Haljeta 31'; Aloísio 35'; Fall 47'; Abdul Rahman 90'	Report	Efrain 45+2'; Sekyi 55'; Bakayoko 63'

Batakan Stadium, Balikpapan
Attendance: 901
Referee: Ahmed Faisal Al-Ali (Jordan)

8 January 2025
18:00 UTC+6:30

Shan United (Myanmar)	0–5	(Malaysia) Terengganu
	Report	Safawi 11' (pen.); Ott 25', 63'; Akhyar 45+7' (pen.), 72'

Thuwunna Stadium, Yangon (Note: Shan United played their home matches at Thuwunna Stadium, Yangon, instead of their regular home stadium Taunggyi Stadium, Taunggyi.)
Attendance: 502
Referee: Koji Takasaki (Japan)
8 January 2025
19:00 UTC+7

BG Pathum United (Thailand)	1–1	(Vietnam) Dong A Thanh Hoa
Sanchai 87'	Report	Doãn Ngọc Tân 71'

BG Stadium, Pathum Thani
Attendance: 4,117
Referee: Akobirxuja Shukurullaev (Uzbekistan)
8 January 2025
19:30 UTC+7

Preah Khan Reach Svay Rieng (Cambodia)	0–1	(Indonesia) PSM Makassar
	Report	Haljeta 1'

Olympic Stadium, Phnom Penh (Note: Preah Khan Reach Svay Rieng played their home matches at Olympic Stadium, Phnom Penh, instead of their regular home stadium Svay Rieng Stadium, Svay Rieng.)
Attendance: 7,602
Referee: Koki Nagamine (Japan)

22 January 2025
18:00 UTC+7

Dong A Thanh Hoa (Vietnam)	0–0	(Cambodia) Preah Khan Reach Svay Rieng
	Report

Thanh Hóa Stadium, Thanh Hóa
Attendance: 2,898
Referee: Ahmed Faisal Al-Ali (Jordan)
22 January 2025
18:30 UTC+6:30

Shan United (Myanmar)	1–4	(Thailand) BG Pathum United
Bakayoko 30'	Report	Álvarez 64' (pen.); Raniel 79'; Nattawut 90+9', 90+13'

Thuwunna Stadium, Yangon
Attendance: 528
Referee: Kim Hee-gon (South Korea)
22 January 2025
21:00 UTC+8

Terengganu (Malaysia)	1–0	(Indonesia) PSM Makassar
Safawi 65' (pen.)	Report

Sultan Mizan Zainal Abidin Stadium, Terengganu
Attendance: 5,089
Referee: Asker Nadjafaliev (Uzbekistan)

5 February 2025
19:30 UTC+7

Preah Khan Reach Svay Rieng (Cambodia)	4–2	(Myanmar) Shan United
Cristian 17', 77'; Bounphachan 20', 33'	Report	Ye Yint Aung 7'; Bakayoko 76' (pen.)

Olympic Stadium, Phnom Penh
Attendance: 5,016
Referee: Nazmi Nasaruddin (Malaysia)
5 February 2025
20:30 UTC+8

PSM Makassar (Indonesia)	3–0	(Vietnam) Dong A Thanh Hoa
Sakai 45+3'; Haljeta 47', 78'	Report

Kapten I Wayan Dipta Stadium, Gianyar
Attendance: 908
Referee: Kim Woo-sung (South Korea)
5 February 2025
19:30 UTC+7

BG Pathum United (Thailand)	4–3	(Malaysia) Terengganu
Raniel 71', 77'; Notsuda 83'; Ilhan 88'	Report	Akhyar 66'; Safawi 90+3', 90+9' (pen.)

BG Stadium, Pathum Thani
Attendance: 3,582
Referee: Ko Hyung-jin (South Korea)

=== Group B ===
Pos	Team	Pld	W	D	L	GF	GA	GD	Pts	Qualification	CAH	BUR	KLC	BOR	LCS	KAY
1	(Vietnam) Cong An Hanoi	5	5	0	0	15	6	+9	15	Advance to Semi-finals		2–1		3–2	5–0	
2	(Thailand) Buriram United	5	3	1	1	13	2	+11	10	Advance to Semi-finals			1–0	4–0		7–0
3	(Malaysia) Kuala Lumpur City	5	2	0	3	4	6	−2	6 (Note: Ranked on head-to-head points: Kuala Lumpur City (3); Borneo (0).)		2–3			1–0		1–0
4	(Indonesia) Borneo	5	2	0	3	7	9	−2	6						3–0	2–1
5	(Singapore) Lion City Sailors	5	1	1	3	2	10	−8	4			0–0	2–0			
6	(Philippines) Kaya–Iloilo	5	1	0	4	4	12	−8	3		1–2				2–0	

Source: ASEAN United FC
Rules for classification: Tiebreakers
Notes:
22 August 2024
20:00 UTC+8

Borneo (Indonesia)	3–0	(Singapore) Lion City Sailors
Léo Gaúcho 3', 80'; Berguinho 20'	Report

Batakan Stadium, Balikpapan
Attendance: 2,158
Referee: Ko Hyung-jin (South Korea)
22 August 2024
19:30 UTC+7

Cong An Hanoi (Vietnam)	2–1	(Thailand) Buriram United
Phan Văn Đức 3'; Alan 66'	Report	Tabinas 49'

Hàng Đẫy Stadium, Hanoi
Attendance: 7,368
Referee: Rustam Lutfullin (Uzbekistan)
22 August 2024
21:00 UTC+8

Kuala Lumpur City (Malaysia)	1–0	(Philippines) Kaya–Iloilo
Haqimi 12'	Report

Kuala Lumpur Stadium, Kuala Lumpur
Attendance: 446
Referee: Qasim Al-Hatmi (Oman)

26 September 2024
19:00 UTC+7

Buriram United (Thailand)	7–0	(Philippines) Kaya–Iloilo
Lucas 8', 50', 53'; Supachai 15'; Athit 77'; Seksan 84'; Chrigor 90+1' (pen.)	Report

Chang Arena, Buriram
Attendance: 15,127
Referee: Rustam Lutfullin (Uzbekistan)
26 September 2024
21:00 UTC+8

Kuala Lumpur City (Malaysia)	1–0	(Indonesia) Borneo
Brendan Gan 77'	Report

Kuala Lumpur Stadium, Kuala Lumpur
Attendance: 927
Referee: Omar Al-Yaqoubi (Oman)
26 September 2024
19:30 UTC+7

Cong An Hanoi (Vietnam)	5–0	(Singapore) Lion City Sailors
Léo Artur 29', 69', 85'; Nguyễn Đình Bắc 60'; Lê Văn Đô 65'	Report

Hàng Đẫy Stadium, Hanoi
Attendance: 6,168
Referee: Abdullah Al-Shehri (Saudi Arabia)

9 January 2025
19:00 UTC+8

Kaya–Iloilo (Philippines)	1–2	(Vietnam) Cong An Hanoi
Swainston 54'	Report	Lê Văn Đô 16'; Casambre 28' (o.g.)

Rizal Memorial Stadium, Manila (Note: Kaya–Iloilo played their first home match at Rizal Memorial Stadium, Manila, instead of their designated home stadium Iloilo Sports Complex, Iloilo City. They played their last match at the Biñan Football Stadium in Biñan due to Rizal Stadium's renovation.)
Attendance: 592
Referee: Chae Sang-hyeop (South Korea)
9 January 2025
19:45 UTC+8

Lion City Sailors (Singapore)	2–0	(Malaysia) Kuala Lumpur City
Wright 26'; Lestienne 66'	Report

Jalan Besar Stadium, Kallang
Attendance: 1,813
Referee: Shen Yinhao (China)
9 January 2025
19:30 UTC+7

Buriram United (Thailand)	4–0	(Indonesia) Borneo
Lucas 25'; Bissoli 27'; Djaló 45+2'; Ratthanakorn 87'	Report

Chang Arena, Buriram
Attendance: 16,029
Referee: Hiroki Kasahara (Japan)

23 January 2025
19:30 UTC+8

Lion City Sailors (Singapore)	0–0	(Thailand) Buriram United
	Report

Jalan Besar Stadium, Kallang
Attendance: 1,937
Referee: Omar Al-Yaqoubi (Oman)
23 January 2025
20:00 UTC+8

Borneo (Indonesia)	2–1	(Philippines) Kaya–Iloilo
Peralta 28'; Dwiky 90+1'	Report	Melliza 82'

Kapten I Wayan Dipta Stadium, Gianyar
Attendance: 139
Referee: Firdavs Nosafarov (Uzbekistan)
23 January 2025
21:00 UTC+8

Kuala Lumpur City (Malaysia)	2–3	(Vietnam) Cong An Hanoi
Rudović 24'; Josué 32'	Report	Nguyễn Quang Hải 10'; Bùi Hoàng Việt Anh 67'; Lê Văn Đô 90+1'

Kuala Lumpur Stadium, Kuala Lumpur
Attendance: 1,562
Referee: Kim Dae-Yong (South Korea)

6 February 2025
20:30 UTC+8

Kaya–Iloilo (Philippines)	2–0	(Singapore) Lion City Sailors
Del Rosario 66'; Melliza 71' (pen.)	Report

Biñan Football Stadium, Biñan
Attendance: 546
Referee: Firdavs Nosafarov (Uzbekistan)
6 February 2025
19:30 UTC+7

Cong An Hanoi (Vietnam)	3–2	(Indonesia) Borneo
Lê Văn Đô 20'; Nguyễn Đình Bắc 81'; Léo Artur 90+1' (pen.)	Report	Habibi 45+1'; Gavin 87'

Hàng Đẫy Stadium, Hanoi
Attendance: 3,618
Referee: Chae Sang-hyeop (South Korea)
6 February 2025
19:30 UTC+7

Buriram United (Thailand)	1–0	(Malaysia) Kuala Lumpur City
Lucas 37'	Report

Chang Arena, Buriram
Attendance: 15,988
Referee: Koji Takasaki (Japan)

== See also ==
- 2026 SAFF Club Championship
