= 2024–25 ASEAN Club Championship =

Third edition of the ASEAN Club Championship

2024–25 Shopee Cup
Tournament details
- Dates: Qualifying: 17 – 24 July 2024; Competition proper: 21 August 2024 – 21 May 2025
- Teams: Competition proper: 12; Total (maximum): 14 (from 10 associations)

Final positions
- Champions: (Thailand) Buriram United (1st title)
- Runners-up: (Vietnam) Cong An Hanoi

Tournament statistics
- Matches played: 36
- Goals scored: 115 (3.19 per match)
- Attendance: 216,642 (6,018 per match)
- Top scorer(s): Lucas Crispim (Buriram United); Léo Artur (Cong An Hanoi); 6 goals each
- Best player: Lucas Crispim (Buriram United)
- Best young player: Ilhan Fandi (BG Pathum United)
- Best goalkeeper: Chatchai Budprom (Buriram United)

The 2024–25 ASEAN Club Championship (or the 2024–25 ACC), known as the 2024–25 Shopee Cup due to sponsorship reasons, was the third edition of the ASEAN Club Championship, an international football competition between clubs affiliated with the ASEAN Football Federation. It was the first competition since 2005. The revival of the ASEAN Club Championship was proposed to the Asian Football Confederation in 2019, but was hampered by the COVID-19 pandemic. A further attempt to resurrect the competition was made in 2023, but that was cancelled due to overlapping competition schedules from other competitions (2026 FIFA World Cup qualification – AFC second round and 2023 AFC Asian Cup).

The tournament was launched on 4 April 2024, with games played from 17 July 2024 to 21 May 2025. Osmar Loss's Buriram United defeated Alexandré Pölking's Cong An Hanoi 3–2 on penalties (5–5 after extra time by aggregate) in the final, which was held at the both Hàng Đẫy Stadium, in Hanoi, Vietnam and Chang Arena, in Buriram, Thailand, to win their first ASEAN Club Championship title. As winners of the ASEAN Club Championship, Buriram United automatically qualified for the 2025–26 ASEAN Club Championship group stage. Buriram United became the first Thai side to win the ASEAN Club Championship. Tampines Rovers were the defending champions of the previous edition, but they failed to qualify after being eliminated by Lion City Sailors from the 2023 Singapore Cup.

== Association team allocation ==
Clubs from all twelve member football associations of the ASEAN Football Federation were eligible to enter the competition; Australia and Timor Leste did not enter.

Participation for 2024–25 ASEAN Club Championship
Participating
Not participating

Football association	Group stage	Play-off
Indonesia	2	—
Malaysia	2	—
Thailand	2	—
Vietnam	2	—
Philippines	1	—
Singapore	1	—
Brunei	—	1
Cambodia	—	1
Laos	—	1
Myanmar	—	1
Australia	—	—
Timor-Leste	—	—

== Teams ==
Group stage direct entrants
Team	Previous league/cup performance	App (Last)
(Indonesia) PSM Makassar	2022–23 Liga 1 champions	1st
(Indonesia) Borneo	2023–24 Liga 1 regular series winners and championship series third place	1st
(Malaysia) Kuala Lumpur City	2023 Malaysia FA Cup runners-up	1st
(Malaysia) Terengganu	2023 Malaysia Cup runners-up	1st
(Thailand) Buriram United	2023–24 Thai League 1 champions	1st
(Thailand) BG Pathum United	2023–24 Thai League Cup winners	1st
(Vietnam) Công An Hà Nội	2023 V.League 1 champions	1st
(Vietnam) Đông Á Thanh Hóa	2023 Vietnamese Cup winners	1st
(Singapore) Lion City Sailors	2023 Singapore Cup winners	1st
(Philippines) Kaya–Iloilo	2022–23 Philippines Football League champions	1st

Qualifying play-off participants
Team	Previous league/cup performance	App (Last)
(Cambodia) Preah Khan Reach Svay Rieng	2023–24 Cambodian Premier League champions	1st
(Laos) Young Elephants	2023 Lao League 1 champions	1st
(Brunei) Kasuka	2023 Brunei Super League champions	1st
(Myanmar) Shan United	2023 Myanmar National League champions	1st

Notes

1. Indonesia (IDN): Persija, the 2022–23 Liga 1 runners-up, initially qualified but declined to participate. Thus, their spot was given to Borneo, the 2023–24 Liga 1 regular series winners.
2. Malaysia (MAS): Johor Darul Ta'zim, the 2023 Malaysia Super League champions, qualified but declined to participate.
3. Singapore (SGP): Albirex Niigata (S), the 2023 Singapore Premier League champions, are a satellite team of a Japanese club and thus ineligible to represent Singapore in the ACC. As a result, Lion City Sailors, the 2023 Singapore Cup winners, qualified instead.

== Prize money ==
The prize money allocated is as follows:

Phase	Purse (USD)
Group stage	>$100,000
Every Match played	$10,000
Semi Finals	TBD
Finals	Champions: $500,000; Runners-up: TBD
Total prize money	$3,000,000

== Schedule ==
The schedule of the competition is as follows.

Stage	Round	Draw date	First leg	Second leg
Qualifying stage	Qualifying play-off	9 May 2024	17 July 2024	24 July 2024
Group stage	Matchday 1	9 May 2024	21–22 August 2024	
Group stage	Matchday 2	9 May 2024	25–26 September 2024	
Group stage	Matchday 3	9 May 2024	8–9 January 2025	
Group stage	Matchday 4	9 May 2024	22–23 January 2025	
Group stage	Matchday 5	9 May 2024	5–6 February 2025	
Knockout stage	Semi-finals	9 May 2024	2 April 2025	30 April & 7 May 2025
Knockout stage	Finals	9 May 2024	14 May 2025	21 May 2025

== Qualifying play-offs ==
Four teams from four member associations competed for two of the twelve berths in the competition proper.

Team 1	Agg.	Team 2	1st leg	2nd leg
Young Elephants (Laos)	3–8	(Cambodia) Preah Khan Reach Svay Rieng	2–3	1–5
Kasuka (Brunei)	2–4	(Myanmar) Shan United	1–1	1–3

== Group stage ==
At the draw on 9 May 2024 in Ho Chi Minh City, Vietnam, twelve teams were drawn into two groups of six. Teams from the same association could not be placed in the same group. The group stage will be a single round-robin format, with the top two teams from each group advancing to the semi-finals.

Location of the 2024–25 ASEAN Club Championship group stage teams
Red: Group A; Yellow: Group B

=== Group A ===
Pos	Team	Pld	W	D	L	GF	GA	GD	Pts	Qualification	BGP	PSM	PKS	TNG	DOA	SHU
1	(Thailand) BG Pathum United	5	3	2	0	11	6	+5	11	Advance to Semi-finals			2–1	4–3	1–1	
2	(Indonesia) PSM Makassar	5	3	1	1	8	4	+4	10	Advance to Semi-finals	0–0				3–0	4–3
3	(Cambodia) Preah Khan Reach Svay Rieng	5	2	1	2	8	7	+1	7 (Note: Ranked on head-to-head points: Preah Khan Reach Svay Rieng (3); Terengganu (0).)			0–1				4–2
4	(Malaysia) Terengganu	5	2	1	2	13	9	+4	7			1–0	2–3		2–2	
5	(Vietnam) Dong A Thanh Hoa	5	1	3	1	6	7	−1	6				0–0			3–1
6	(Myanmar) Shan United	5	0	0	5	7	20	−13	0		1–4			0–5		

Source: ASEAN United FC
Rules for classification: Tiebreakers

=== Group B ===
Pos	Team	Pld	W	D	L	GF	GA	GD	Pts	Qualification	CAH	BUR	KLC	BOR	LCS	KAY
1	(Vietnam) Cong An Hanoi	5	5	0	0	15	6	+9	15	Advance to Semi-finals		2–1		3–2	5–0	
2	(Thailand) Buriram United	5	3	1	1	13	2	+11	10	Advance to Semi-finals			1–0	4–0		7–0
3	(Malaysia) Kuala Lumpur City	5	2	0	3	4	6	−2	6 (Note: Ranked on head-to-head points: Kuala Lumpur City (3); Borneo (0).)		2–3			1–0		1–0
4	(Indonesia) Borneo	5	2	0	3	7	9	−2	6						3–0	2–1
5	(Singapore) Lion City Sailors	5	1	1	3	2	10	−8	4			0–0	2–0			
6	(Philippines) Kaya–Iloilo	5	1	0	4	4	12	−8	3		1–2				2–0	

Source: ASEAN United FC
Rules for classification: Tiebreakers

== Knockout stage ==
=== Bracket ===
Semi-finals
A2	(Indonesia) PSM Makassar	1	0	1
B1	(Vietnam) Cong An Hanoi	0	2	2
B2	(Thailand) Buriram United	3	0	3
A1	(Thailand) BG Pathum United	1	0	1

Final
B1	(Vietnam) Cong An Hanoi	2	3	5 (2)
B2	(Thailand) Buriram United (p)	2	3	5 (3)

=== Semi-finals ===
Team 1	Agg.	Team 2	1st leg	2nd leg
PSM Makassar (Indonesia)	1–2	(Vietnam) Cong An Hanoi	1–0	0–2
Buriram United (Thailand)	3–1	(Thailand) BG Pathum United	3–1	0–0

=== Final ===
Team 1	Agg.	Team 2	1st leg	2nd leg
Cong An Hanoi (Vietnam)	5–5 (2–3 p)	(Thailand) Buriram United	2–2	3–3 (a.e.t.)

14 May 2025
19:30 UTC+7

Cong An Hanoi (Vietnam)	2–2	(Thailand) Buriram United
Léo Artur 18'; Alan 35'	Report	Good 28'; Žulj 79'

Hàng Đẫy Stadium, Hanoi
Attendance: 13,879
Referee: Kim Hee-gon (South Korea)

21 May 2025
19:30 UTC+7

Buriram United (Thailand)	3–3 (a.e.t.)	(Vietnam) Cong An Hanoi
Žulj 83'; Lucas 90+8'; Bissoli 105' (pen.)	Report	Pendant 15'; Léo Artur 39' (pen.); Alan 118'
Penalties
Žulj (penalty scored); Lucas (penalty scored); Boakye (penalty missed); Phitiwat (penalty scored); Dougall (penalty missed)	3–2	(penalty scored) Lê Văn Đô; (penalty missed) Pendant; (penalty missed) Gomes; (penalty scored) Alan; (penalty missed) Bùi Hoàng Việt Anh

Chang Arena, Buriram
Attendance: 31,290
Referee: Koji Takasaki (Japan)

== Season statistics ==
=== Top scorers ===
Team eliminated / inactive for this round.

Rank	Player	Team	MD1	MD2	MD3	MD4	MD5	SF1	SF2	F1	F2	Total
1	(Brazil) Lucas Crispim	(Thailand) Buriram United		3	1		1				1	6
1	(Brazil) Léo Artur	(Vietnam) Công An Hà Nội		3			1			1	1	6
3	(Malaysia) Safawi Rasid	(Malaysia) Terengganu	1		1	1	2					5
4	(Brazil) Raniel	(Thailand) BG Pathum United		1		1	2					4
4	(Vietnam) Lê Văn Đô	(Vietnam) Công An Hà Nội		1	1	1	1					4
4	(Slovenia) Nermin Haljeta	(Indonesia) PSM Makassar		1	1		2					4
4	(Ivory Coast) Moussa Bakayoko	(Myanmar) Shan United	1	1		1	1					4
4	(Philippines) Manny Ott	(Malaysia) Terengganu	1	1	2							4
4	(Malaysia) Akhyar Rashid	(Malaysia) Terengganu		1	2		1					4
10	(Brazil) Guilherme Bissoli	(Thailand) Buriram United			1			1			1	3
10	(Brazil) Alan Grafite	(Vietnam) Công An Hà Nội	1							1	1	3

=== Team of the Tournament ===
Pos.	Player	Team
Goalkeeper	(Thailand) Chatchai Budprom	(Thailand) Buriram United
Defenders	(Australia) Curtis Good	(Thailand) Buriram United
Defenders	(Thailand) Kritsada Kaman	(Thailand) BG Pathum United
Defenders	(Vietnam) Trần Đình Trọng	(Vietnam) Công An Hà Nội
Midfielders	(Thailand) Theerathon Bunmathan	(Thailand) Buriram United
Midfielders	(Brazil) Lucas Crispim	(Thailand) Buriram United
Midfielders	(Brazil) Léo Artur	(Vietnam) Công An Hà Nội
Midfielders	(Vietnam) Nguyễn Quang Hải	(Vietnam) Công An Hà Nội
Forwards	(Vietnam) Lê Văn Đô	(Vietnam) Công An Hà Nội
Forwards	(Slovenia) Nermin Haljeta	(Indonesia) PSM Makassar
Forwards	(Malaysia) Safawi Rasid	(Malaysia) Terengganu

=== Player of the Tournament ===
- (Brazil) Lucas Crispim

=== Young Player of the Tournament ===
- (Singapore) Ilhan Fandi ( (Thailand) BG Pathum United)

=== Best Goalkeeper ===
- (Thailand) Chatchai Budprom ( (Thailand) Buriram United)

Note

- Goals scored in the qualifying play-offs are not counted when determining top scorer

== See also ==
- 2025 CAFA Silk Way Cup
- 2026 SAFF Club Championship
