= Phạm Văn Luân =

Vietnamese footballer

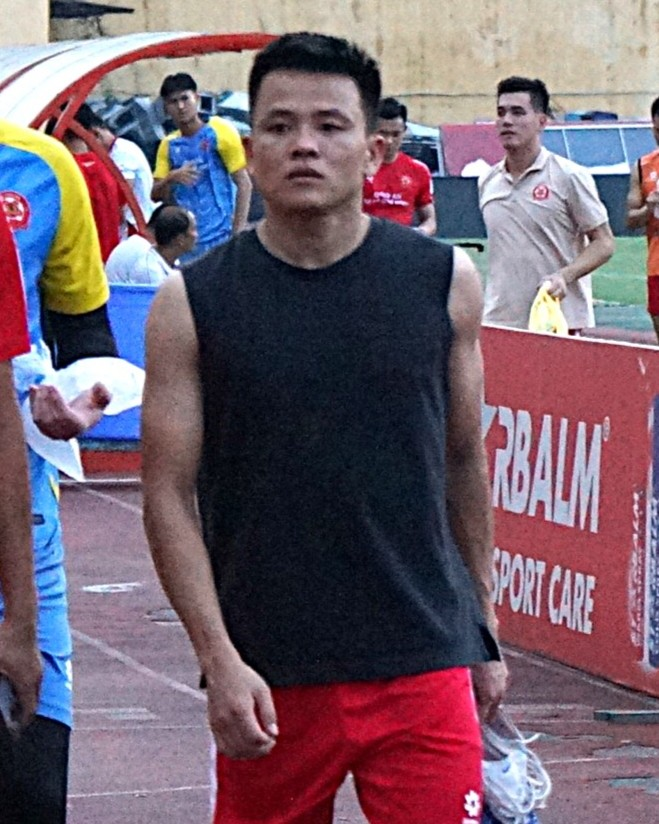
- Văn Luân in 2026

Personal information
- Full name: Phạm Văn Luân
- Date of birth: 26 May 1999 (age 27)
- Place of birth: Ea Kar, Đắk Lắk, Vietnam
- Height: 1.71 m (5 ft 7 in)
- Position: Midfielder

Team information
- Current team: Công An Hồ Chí Minh City (on loan from Công An Hà Nội)
- Number: 12

Youth career
- 2014–2016: Khánh Hòa

Senior career*
Years	Team	Apps	(Gls)
2016	→ Bình Thuận (loan)		
2017–2019	Đắk Lắk	15	(4)
2018	→ Phố Hiến (loan)		
2020	Cần Thơ	16	(0)
2021–2022	Sài Gòn	3	(0)
2022	→ FC Ryukyu (loan)	1	(0)
2023–	Công An Hà Nội	39	(0)
2025–	→ Công An Hồ Chí Minh City (loan)	3	(0)

International career
2023	Vietnam	3	(0)
- * Club domestic league appearances and goals as of 7 June 2026

Phạm Văn Luân (born 26 May 1999) is a Vietnamese professional footballer who plays as a midfielder for V.League 1 club Công An Hồ Chí Minh City, on loan from Công An Hà Nội.

== Club career ==
In March 2022, Văn Luân joined J2 League club FC Ryukyu on a short-term loan from Sài Gòn. On 11 June 2022, he made his J2 League debut in a 1–2 defeat against V-Varen Nagasaki.

In June 2023, Văn Luân signed for V.League 1 club Công An Hà Nội as a mid-season addition. For the rest of the 2023 season, he appeared in seven matches and won the V.League 1 title with his club.

In July 2025, Văn Luân was loaned to Công An Hồ Chí Minh City, another Police club in V.League 1.

== International career ==
On 28 December 2023, Văn Luân was named in Vietnam national team's preliminary squad for the 2023 AFC Asian Cup but was not included in the final list.

== Career statistics ==
=== Club ===
As of match played 14 June 2026

Club	Season	League			Cup		Continental		Other		Total	
Club	Season	Division	Apps	Goals	Apps	Goals	Apps	Goals	Apps	Goals	Apps	Goals
Đắk Lắk	2019	V.League 2	15	4	1	0	—		—		16	4
Cần Thơ	2020	V.League 2	16	0	1	0	—		—		17	0
Sài Gòn	2021	V.League 1	3	0	1	0	—		0	0	4	0
Sài Gòn	2022	V.League 1	0	0	0	0	—		0	0	0	0
Sài Gòn	Total		3	0	1	0	0	0	0	0	4	0
FC Ryukyu (loan)	2022	J2 League	1	0	1	0	—		0	0	2	0
Công An Hà Nội	2023	V.League 1	7	0	1	0	—		—		8	0
Công An Hà Nội	2023–24	V.League 1	23	0	1	0	—		1 (Note: Appearance in Vietnamese Super Cup)	0	25	0
Công An Hà Nội	2024–25	V.League 1	9	0	1	0	—		1 (Note: Appearance in ASEAN Club Championship)	0	11	0
Công An Hà Nội	Total		39	0	3	0	0	0	2	0	44	0
Công An Hồ Chí Minh City	2025–26	V.League 1	3	0	0	0	—		—		3	0
Career total			77	4	7	0	0	0	2	0	86	4

=== International ===
As of match played 9 January 2024

Appearances and goals by national team and year
National team	Year	Apps	Goals
Vietnam	2023	2	0
Vietnam	2024	1	0
Total		3	0

== Honours ==
Công An Hà Nội

- V.League 1: 2023
- Vietnamese National Cup: 2024–25

Công An Hồ Chí Minh City

- Vietnamese National Cup: 2025–26
