= Trần Tiến Đại =

Vietnamese football manager (born 1966)

Personal information
- Full name: Trần Tiến Đại
- Date of birth: 1966 (age 59–60)
- Place of birth: Saigon, South Vietnam
- Height: 1.66 m (5 ft 5 in)

Senior career*
| Years | Team | Apps | (Gls) |
| ?–1994 | Hồ Chí Minh City Police B | | |

Managerial career
- 2011: Sông Lam Nghệ An (Sporting director)
- 2012–2013: Xuan Thanh Saigon Cement
- 2023–: Hanoi Police (Sporting director)
- 2023: Hanoi Police (Caretaker)
- 2024: Hanoi Police (Caretaker)
- * Club domestic league appearances and goals

Trần Tiến Đại (born 1966) is a Vietnamese football manager, currently the sporting director of V.League 1 club Hanoi Police.

== Career ==
As a player, he appeared for the Hồ Chí Minh City Police in the reserve team. He played as a defender and midfielder. In 1994, he was forced to retire due to injury.

After his retirement, he worked as a player agent and later as an executive director for several clubs.

== Honours ==
Xuan Thanh Saigon Cement

- Vietnamese Cup: 2012

Hanoi Police

- V.League 1: 2023
