= ASEAN Super League =

International association football competition

The ASEAN Super League was a proposed regional association football competition between domestic club sides run by the ASEAN Football Federation. It was initially scheduled to commence in 2017. In January 2017 it was announced there could be a delay to 2018 or later though. In June 2017 it was announced that the competition would not take place at all.

== Reception ==
Tampines Rovers' 2016 signing Jermaine Pennant said: I don't think it's going to be beneficial at all for Singapore football if the best players and the best teams are shipped off to a different league, I don't think the fans will appreciate it. His sentiments were shared by team-mate Afiq Yunos.

Tunku Ismail Sultan Ibrahim, Crown Prince of Johor and chairman of Malaysian Super League club Johor Darul Takzim, said: "I don't agree with the ASL. I think we're [South-east Asian football] still young and we [should] focus on how it is done in Europe. For now, the Asian Champions League is the highest target. The ASL is not really my cup of tea."

In April 2016, Buriram United's boss Newin Chidchob also said, "Quite simply, I don’t support the idea of an ASEAN Super League and I don’t think it works from either a competitive or organisational perspective. The business terms and the return on the investment are not good enough, I mean, they’re asking small clubs to pay US$5 million (S$6.7m), but how much can those clubs win in this proposed league?”

== See also ==
- ASEAN Club Championship
- Mekong Club Championship
