= Naken Kyrykbaev =

Kazakhstani footballer

Personal information
- Date of birth: 29 August 1975
- Date of death: 5 April 2015 (aged 39)
- Position: Goalkeeper

Senior career*
Years	Team	Apps	(Gls)
1993	Namys	17	(0)
1994–1997	Kairat	25	(0)
1996	→ Taldykorgan (loan)	1	(0)
1998–2001	Taraz FK	75	(0)
2001–2002	Cong An Hanoi	?	(?)
2002	Vostok	24	(0)
2003	Taraz FK	9	(0)
2003–2004	Kaisar	6	(0)
2005–2007	Zhambyl Taraz	13	(0)

International career
2000	Kazakhstan	2	(0)
- * Club domestic league appearances and goals

Naken Kyrykbaev (29 August 1975 – 5 April 2015) was a Kazakh international footballer who played as a goalkeeper for FC Taraz and the national team. He continues to hold the Taraz record for penalty kick defense. He moved to coaching in 2012.
