= Nermin Haljeta =

Slovenian association football player

Personal information
- Full name: Nermin Haljeta
- Date of birth: 7 June 1997 (age 29)
- Place of birth: Celje, Slovenia
- Height: 1.95 m (6 ft 5 in)
- Position: Striker

Team information
- Current team: PSIM Yogyakarta
- Number: 99

Senior career*
Years	Team	Apps	(Gls)
2015–2016	Šampion	5	(0)
2016–2017	Krsko	19	(3)
2017–2018	Teplice	4	(0)
2018–2019	Domžale	2	(1)
2018–2019	→ Ilirija 1911 (loan)	23	(7)
2019–2020	Drava Ptuj	19	(9)
2020	Zvijezda 09	3	(0)
2020–2023	Nafta 1903	65	(27)
2023	Rogaska	14	(2)
2023–2024	Floridsdorfer AC	28	(7)
2024–2025	PSM Makassar	29	(12)
2025–	PSIM Yogyakarta	36	(5)
- * Club domestic league appearances and goals as of 18 September 2026

Nermin Haljeta (born 7 June 1997) is a Slovenian professional footballer who plays as a striker for Super League club PSIM Yogyakarta.

== Club career ==
=== Šampion ===
Haljeta began his career at Šampion. In May 2015, he played for the third division club's first team for the first time, making a total of five appearances.

=== Krško ===
Haljeta moved to first division club Krško for the 2016–17 season. There he made his debut in the Slovenian PrvaLiga on 1 August 2016 in a 3–1 loss against Olimpija Ljubljana. In his first season in the first division, he made 19 appearances and scored three times.

=== Teplice ===
Haljeta moved to Teplice in the Czech Republic for the 2017–18 season. However, he only made four appearances for Teplice in the Czech First League that season.

=== Domžale ===
Haljeta returned to Slovenia for the 2018–19 Slovenian PrvaLiga and joined Domžale. He played twice for Domžale in the first league before being loaned out to second-division club ND Ilirija 1911 in August 2018. He made 23 appearances for Ilirija in the 2nd SNL until the end of the season, scoring seven times.

=== Drava Ptuj ===
Haljeta did not return to Domžale for the 2019–20 season, instead moving permanently to second-division club Drava Ptuj. He played in all 19 second division games for Drava Ptuj up until the winter break, scoring nine goals.

=== Zvijezda 09 ===
In February 2020, Haljeta moved abroad for a second time to Bosnia and Herzegovina to First League of the Republika Srpska club Zvijezda 09. He played three times for Zvijezda in the league before the season was cut short due to COVID-19. However, he was relegated from the top flight with the team.

=== Nafta 1903 ===
Haljeta then returned to Slovenia for the 2020–21 season and joined Nafta 1903. In the 2020–21 season, he scored eleven goals in 20 appearances for Nafta. On 16 September 2020, Haljeta scored his first career hat-trick where he also recorded a brace of assists in a 10–0 thrashing win against Šmartno 1928.

In the 2021–22 season, he scored eleven goals again, but appeared in 28 games. In the 2022–23 season, he scored five times in 17 appearances until the winter break.

=== Rogaska ===
In January 2023, Haljeta moved to Rogaska. He played twelve times for Rogaška in the 2nd SNL until the end of the season and was promoted to the 1st SNL with the team. He made two appearances in the top flight at the start of the 2023–24 season.

=== Floridsdorfer AC ===
In August 2023, he moving to Austrian 2. Liga side Floridsdorfer AC, where he signed a contract until 2025. On 13 August 2023, Haljeta made his league debut for the club in a match against Sturm Graz II, coming on as a substitute for Yannick Woudstra in the 60th minute. On 1 September 2023, Haljeta scored first goal for the club, earning them a 3–1 win over Liefering. He made 28 appearances for Floridsdorf in the 2nd division, scoring seven times.

=== PSM Makassar ===
On 5 July 2024, Haljeta signed for Indonesian Liga 1 club, PSM Makassar. On 10 August 2024, Haljeta made his league debut for the club in a 3–0 home win against Persis Solo. And he also scored his first league goal for the team, with scored a brace at Batakan Stadium, as well as topping the provisional top scorers in the first week of the league. On 16 August 2024, he scored the opening goal in a 1–2 away win over PSBS Biak. On 8 January 2025, Haljeta scored the only goal in the match during the 2024–25 ASEAN Club Championship against Cambodian club Preah Khan Reach Svay Rieng.

== Honours ==
Individual

- Liga 1 Player of the Month: August 2024
- ASEAN Club Championship: Allstar XI 2024–25
