= Alan Grafite =

Brazilian footballer (born 1998)

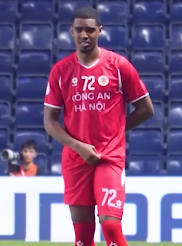
- Alan Grafite in 2025

Personal information
- Full name: Alan Sebastião Alexandre
- Date of birth: 8 February 1998 (age 28)
- Place of birth: Criciúma, Brazil
- Height: 1.89 m (6 ft 2 in)
- Position: Striker

Team information
- Current team: Cong An Hanoi
- Number: 72

Youth career
- 2012–2017: Criciúma
- 2017–2018: Chapecoense

Senior career*
Years	Team	Apps	(Gls)
2017	Criciúma	0	(0)
2017–2021	Chapecoense	14	(1)
2019	→ Toledo (loan)	2	(0)
2021	→ Concórdia (loan)	10	(4)
2021–2023	Vila Nova	21	(1)
2022	→ Cianorte (loan)	13	(3)
2022	→ Botafogo-PB (loan)	14	(2)
2023	→ Confiança (loan)	19	(1)
2023–2024	Quy Nhon Binh Dinh	22	(17)
2024–	Cong An Hanoi	39	(32)
- * Club domestic league appearances and goals as of 20 September 2026

Alan Sebastião Alexandre (born 8 February 1998), commonly known as Alan Grafite, is a Brazilian professional footballer who plays as a striker for V.League 1 club Cong An Hanoi.

== Career ==
Alan began his career playing in Brazil lower divisions. Alan was part of Chapecoense team that won the 2020 Série B. He scored 1 goal during the season, in the 2–0 away win against Confiança.

In October 2023, Alan moved to Vietnam, joining V.League 1 club Quy Nhon Binh Dinh. He finished as the second best goalscorer in the 2023–24 V.League 1 season and helped the club finish as runners-up.

On 19 July 2024, Alan was transferred to fellow V.League 1 side Cong An Hanoi. In the 2024–25 V.League 1, Alan scored 14 goals and shared the league’s top scorer award with Lucão do Break. In the 2024–25 Vietnamese Cup final, he netted a hat-trick in Cong An Hanoi’s 5–0 victory over Song Lam Nghe An, helping his team secure their first-ever National Cup title. His performances earned him the Player of the Year award at the 2025 V.League Awards. At the regional level, Alan helped Cong An Hanoi reach the 2025 ASEAN Club Championship final, scoring twice across the two legs, though his team ultimately lost to Buriram United in the penalty shootout.

== Career statistics ==
As of 8 October 2026

Club	Season	League			State League		Cup		Continental		Other		Total	
Club	Season	Division	Apps	Goals	Apps	Goals	Apps	Goals	Apps	Goals	Apps	Goals	Apps	Goals
Criciúma	2017	Série B	0	0	0	0	0	0	—		2 (Note: Appearance(s) in Primeira Liga)	0	2	0
Chapecoense	2017	Série A	0	0	—		0	0	—		—		0	0
Chapecoense	2018	Série A	0	0	0	0	0	0	—		—		0	0
Chapecoense	2019	Série A	0	0	3	0	0	0	—		—		3	0
Chapecoense	2020	Série B	4	1	7	0	0	0	—		—		11	1
Chapecoense	Total		4	1	10	0	0	0	—		0	0	14	1
Toledo (loan)	2019	Paranaense	—		2	0	—		—		—		2	0
Concórdia (loan)	2020	Catarinense	—		—		—		—		3 (Note: Appearance(s) in Copa Santa Catarina)	0	3	0
Concórdia (loan)	2021	Catarinense	—		10	4	—		—		—		10	4
Concórdia (loan)	Total		—		10	4	—		—		3	0	13	4
Vila Nova	2021	Série B	21	1	—		—		—		2 (Note: Appearance(s) in Copa Verde)	0	23	1
Cianorte (loan)	2022	Paranaense	—		13	3	—		—		—		13	3
Botafogo-PB (loan)	2022	Série C	9	0	5	2	—		—		—		14	2
Confiança (loan)	2023	Série C	7	0	12	1	—		—		2 (Note: Appearance(s) in Copa do Nordeste)	0	21	1
Quy Nhon Binh Dinh	2023–24	V.League 1	22	17	—		0	0	—		—		22	17
Cong An Hanoi	2024–25	V.League 1	18	14	—		3	5	—		8 (Note: Appearance(s) in ASEAN Club Championship)	3	29	22
Cong An Hanoi	2025–26	V.League 1	18	16	—		0	0	8 (Note: Appearance(s) in AFC Champions League Two)	1	6 (Note: One appearance and one goal in Vietnamese Super Cup; Five appearances and three goals in ASEAN Club Championship)	4	32	21
Cong An Hanoi	2026–27	V.League 1	3	2	—		0	0	3 (Note: Appearances in AFC Champions League Elite)	0	2 (Note: One appearance and two goals in Vietnamese Super Cup; one appearance in ASEAN Club Championship)	2	8	4
Cong An Hanoi	Total		39	32	—		3	5	11	1	16	9	69	47
Career total			102	51	52	10	3	5	11	1	25	9	192	76

== Honours ==
Chapecoense

- Campeonato Catarinense: 2020
- Campeonato Brasileiro Série B: 2020

Cong An Hanoi

- V.League 1: 2025–26
- Vietnamese Cup: 2024–25
- Vietnamese Super Cup: 2025, 2026
- ASEAN Club Championship: runner-up 2024-25

Individual

- V.League 1 top scorer: 2024–25 (shared), 2025–26
- V.League 1 Team of the Season: 2024–25, 2025–26
- V.League 1 Player of the Year: 2024–25
