= Cong An Hanoi FC =

Vietnamese football club

Công An Hà Nội
- Full name: Công An Hà Nội Football Club
- Nicknames: Đội bóng ngành Công an (The Police Department Football Team); Đội bóng Thủ đô (The Metropolitan Team); Đại diện Thủ đô (Representative of the Capital City); Bức tường (The Wall); Những chú ngựa (The Horses); Đội bóng Hoàng Thành (Hoang Thanh Football Team); Bà La Sát (Princess Iron Fan)
- Short name: CAHN
- Founded: 10 October 1956; 70 years ago 7 April 2008; 18 years ago as Công An Nhân Dân; 24 November 2022; 3 years ago as Công An Hà Nội
- Ground: Hàng Đẫy Stadium
- Capacity: 22,500
- Chairman: Nguyễn Tiến Đạt
- Head coach: Alexandré Pölking
- League: V.League 1
- 2025–26: V.League 1, 1st of 14 (champions)
- Website: cahnfc.com
Home colours	Away colours	Third colours

Công An Hà Nội Football Club (Vietnamese: Câu lạc bộ bóng đá Công An Hà Nội), also known as Hanoi Police or simply CAHN, is a Vietnamese professional football club based in Hanoi and is controlled by the Department of Public Security of Hanoi. The team competed in V.League 1, the highest division of Vietnamese football.

Established in 1956, Công An Hà Nội once dissolved in 2002 and re-established in 2008 as Công An Nhân Dân (Vietnamese: CLB Công An Nhân Dân, lit. 'People's Public Security Football Club'). After being promoted to V.League 1 in the 2023 season, the club changed their name to the current Công An Hà Nội.

Throughout their history, The club has won three V.League 1 titles, one V.League 2 title, one Vietnamese National Cup and one Vietnamese Super Cup.

== History ==
=== Establishment and breakthrough (1956–2002) ===
In 1954, Minister of Public Security Trần Quốc Hoàn directed then-Hanoi City Public Security Director Nguyễn Văn Long to establish a football team known as Công An Hà Nội Football Club. Founded on 10 October 1956, perhaps only after the military's Thể Công, and became known as the "capital's representative" by the People's Committee of Hanoi. When first established, the CAHN was under the leadership of Lê Viễn, an official in charge of sports within the Ministry of Public Security, and Hoàng Nghĩa Đường, a former boxing champion of Indochina and a member of the Coordination Department of Hanoi Public Security. They used their political influence to request special permission from the Ministry of Public Security to take over almost the entire Hoàng Diệu Football Club. This team, whose players had previously been at a military police team run by the French colonial administration, was the strongest in Hanoi at that time. Its lineup included goalkeepers Nghĩa and A Loóc, as well as players Bùi Nghẽn, Lưu Đình Tòng, Nguyễn Huy Luyến, Nguyễn Thưởng, Nguyễn Văn Thìn, Bùi Hợi, Vũ Hợi, Tuất, and Phú Tí. The team was supplemented with public security officers interested in football and talented young Hanoians. In the early stages, there were individuals such as Phan Đức Âu, Nguyễn Mạnh Cường, and in the following group, there were Đài "gôn", Tô Hiền, Tô Giới Pháp, Xuân "gôn", Du "cò", Sơn "min", Đức "khựa", Độ "trây", Thọ "gáo", Thái "si", Thịnh "cơm", Hạc "phệ", Thành A., Ngọc "tráp", and Dư "còng".

During the early days of restored peace, the matches of Công An Hà Nội versus Thể Công, as well as their matches with other teams at the Septo Field (which was renamed Hàng Đẫy Stadium in 1958), served as a real source of encouragement for the nation's rebuilding efforts after the extraordinary anti-French colonial period.

By the late 1960s and early 1970s, the Hà Nội city prioritized adding players to the club from various sources. There were internally trained players like Tô Quang Nhạ, who later became the captain. Players transferred from Thanh Niên Hà Nội, such as Quang B, Đặng "cóc", Hai "voi", Cường Học, Pháp "ngớ", Điệp "lùn", and Chi "tơ". Players coming from abroad, including Thành C. and Hiển "Coóc" (Từ Như Hiển). From the Thể Công team, there were Duy Lễ and Nghị “chớp”, and from the training school, there was Hiếu "trâu".

In 1957, just one year after its establishment, Công An Hà Nội defeated Thể Công 2–0 in the finals of the Northern Region A League Championship, asserting its position in the football community of Northern Vietnam.

The second half of the 90s of the 20th century can be said to be an unfortunate period for the team when with a relatively equal lineup of players, but the team is more known for its betting scandals and borrowing points. than achievements on the field. In 1992, the team performed poorly and had to be relegated to A1. In the 1995 season, the team again won the right to be promoted to the Major League (currently V.League 1).

Over the years, the team has contributed many generations of players to the national team of the Public Security sector, competing against public security teams from other countries within socialist blocs, as well as representing Hanoi and Vietnam in various international tournaments.

=== Dissolution (2002–2007) ===
In the period of changing the mechanism in how to make football, a football team of players on the staff of the Public Security could not exist. In 2002, the team was dissolved and sold their participation slot to Vietnam Airlines at 2003 V-League. After the 2003 tournament, the Vietnam Airlines was dissolved and sold their spot in the V-League to ACB Sports Joint Stock Company, the owner of Hanoi ACB. This club also accepted eight players from Vietnam Airlines The rest of the players were transferred to play Vietnamese National Football First Division with Hòa Phát Hà Nội.

=== Re-establishment as Công An Nhân Dân (2008–2021) ===
On 7 April 2008, Lieutenant General Nguyễn Khánh Toàn, the then-Deputy Minister of Public Security (Vietnam) signed the Decision No. 375 to establish the Công An Nhân Dân Football Club, a club belonging to the Vietnam People's Public Security. After several playing in lower divisions of Vietnamese football, Công An Nhân Dân won the 2022 V.League 2 and promoted to the V.League 1 for the first time since their formation.

=== Promotion to V.League 1 and rebranding (2022–present) ===
In November 2022, implementing the "Project on development of the CAND Football Club in a professional direction", General Tô Lâm, Politburo member, Minister Ministry of Public Security directing the transfer of the newly promoted "Công An Nhân Dân" to the management of Hanoi City Public Security and changing its name to Công An Hà Nội (Hanoi Public security Football Club), 20 years after being dissolved. They rebuild a strong team consisting of 11 players from the former Công An Nhân Dân team and recruited more than 20 players from domestic and international clubs (as required by the V.League regulations that clubs accepting promoted spots must include a minimum of 10 players from the transferring club). Notable players signed by Công An Hà Nội were Đoàn Văn Hậu, Vũ Văn Thanh, Hồ Tấn Tài, Phan Văn Đức, Nguyẽn Quang Hải and Filip Nguyễn. In the 2023 V.League 1, the team clinched a dramatic championship title, finishing with 38 points and drawing 1–1 against Thanh Hóa at Hàng Đẫy Stadium in the final match. With this achievement, Công An Hà Nội replicated the success of Hoàng Anh Gia Lai in 2003 and Đồng Thắp in 1989, as they won the championship in their very first season after promotion.

==== Alexandré Pölking reigns (2024–present) ====
Brazilian head coach, Alexandré Pölking guided the team to multiple honours in the club history.

On 23 May 2024, Công An Hà Nội managed to pulled Brazilian head coach Alexandré Pölking who is experienced for his work in the Southeast Asia region, to a two-years contract with the club. Công An Hà Nội then competed in the 2024–25 ASEAN Club Championship as the 2023 V.League 1 champions. This was the first time that the club faces teams from outside Vietnam in an official match. Công An Hà Nội were then drawn in a group alongside Thailand club Buriram United, Singaporean club Lion City Sailors, Malaysian club Kuala Lumpur City, Filipino club Kaya–Iloilo and Indonesian club Borneo Samarinda. Công An Hà Nội went on to have a 100% winning record in the group stage and also notably beaten Southeast Asian giants, Buriram United 2–1 at home on 22 August 2024. The club then advance as group leaders and faced Group A runners-up from Indonesia, PSM Makassar in the semi-finals and won 1–2 on aggregate, thus making the club advanced to final. However, the club lost the final on 21 May 2025 against Buriram United under a 3–2 from penalties under 5–5 aggregate. In the final of the 2024–25 Vietnamese Cup on 29 June 2025, Công An Hà Nội thrash opponent Sông Lam Nghệ An 5–0 as Alan Grafite scored a hat-trick to guide the club to win their first ever Cup in the club history.

As the winner of the 2024–25 Vietnamese Cup, Công An Hà Nội qualified to the 2025–26 AFC Champions League Two and the regional 2025–26 ASEAN Club Championship. In the ASEAN Club Championship, Công An Hà Nội was then drawn in Group A alongside both Thailand club Buriram United and BG Pathum United, Vietnamese club Công An Hà Nội, Malaysian club, Selangor and Singaporean club Tampines Rovers. Công An Hà Nội ended up finishing in fourth position in the group stage thus didn't see themselves qualified to the next round. Công An Hà Nội then qualified to the round of 16 in the AFC Champions League Two after finishing as group stage runners-up thus facing Singaporean club Tampines Rovers in the knockout stage. However, the club was forfeited with a 3–0 defeat in the first leg for fielding two ineligible players, Stefan Mauk and Rogério Alves. Công An Hà Nội then bowed out from the tournament after suffering a 6–1 defeat on aggregate. The defeat didn't stop Công An Hà Nội as they went on to become the 2025–26 V.League 1 champions. On 24 April 2026, head coach Alexandré Pölking signed a three-year contract extension until 2028.

==== AFC Champions League Elite debut ====
Công An Hà Nội started off the 2026–27 season playing in the 2026–27 AFC Champions League Elite preliminary round facing off against Australian club Adelaide United on 11 August 2026. Công An Hà Nội then went on to win 2–0 at the Hindmarsh Stadium thus seeing the club qualified to the league phase for the first time in the club history.

== Team image ==
=== Crests and colours ===
The current crest colors of Công An Hà Nội is red, tangerine yellow, and white. It has the emblem of People's Public Security of Vietnam with the club establishment year in the center. The two stars at the middle of the white ring repersents the 2 ears of rice from the emblem of PPS. Bộ Công An (Ministry of Public Security) and Công An Hà Nội are written in red on top and bottom, respectively.

Crest of Công An Hà Nội (2022–present)

=== Colours ===
Previously, Công An Hà Nội's home kit was a dark blue color until 2002. However, currently, the club's home kit is red. The away colors are usually all yellow or all white.

=== Rivalries ===
==== Hà Nội ====
Following their return to the V.League 1 in 2023 and their rebranding to the current name Công An Hà Nội, the club relocated to Hanoi, thus shares the Hàng Đẫy Stadium with Hà Nội. Shortly after its promotion, the team also signed Đoàn Văn Hậu, a key player from Hà Nội, causing discontentment among the latter's supporters. CAHN's rapid rise also challenged Hà Nội's dominant status in the league, leading to a new rivalry between the two teams.

The two clubs first met for the first time in the 2nd matchday of Stage I in the 2023 V.League 1 when The Purple won 2–0 against their rival with goals from Trần Văn Kiên and Nguyễn Văn Quyết. However, in the rematch in the return leg at 5th matchday of Stage II of the 2023 season, after both clubs had made personnel changes between seasons, CAHN won 2–1 against the purple-clad team thanks to the brace from Gustavo Henrique . As a result, CAHN rose to the top of the table with 2 points more than the purple-clad team. In addition to moving to the top of the table, CAHN defeated their rival in their 350th national league game. CAHN later managed their first league since 1984.

==== Thể Công - Viettel ====
In the 20th century, the derby between the CAHN and Thể Công was one of the biggest derby games in Vietnam. The two teams were established in Hanoi and both represented the people's armed forces with CAHN representing the public security, while Thể Công represents the army. Both teams were prominent forces of the Northern Vietnamese football and was the confrontation between many football stars of the country. Despite Thể Công proudly holding the most North Vietnam league titles, CAHN had remained their challenging opponent throughout history. In fact, the CAHN has often defeated Thể Công when the opponent was on the verge of winning the league title.

On 14 February 2023, CAHN lost 1–2 to Viettel in 3rd matchday of the 2023 V.League 1 season at Hàng Đẫy. This was the first official encounter between the two teams after 21 years.

=== Controversy ===
==== FIFA transfer ban ====
In 2025, despite having a preliminary agreement with the team, Công An Hà Nội decided against signing Andrey Ramos. Andrey Ramos' representative claimed that Công An Hà Nội still has a financial obligation with him and brought the case to FIFA. On 16 September 2026, FIFA banned Công An Hà Nội in the transfer market, prohibiting the team from signing new players until 2028 unless the case is settled.

== Kit suppliers and shirt sponsors ==
CAHN's original colours, worn until 2002

Period	Kit manufacturer	Shirt sponsor
2015–2017	(England) Mitre	
2018	(Japan) Jogarbola	
2019	(England) Mitre	
2020	(Thailand) Grand Sport	
2021	(England) Mitre	Ông Bầu Coffee; The Vissai Group
2022	(Japan) Jogarbola	The Vissai Group; Bolaven Bananas
2023–2024	(Vietnam) Kamito	Công An Hà Nội
2024–2025	(Vietnam) CA Sport	Công An Hà Nội
2025–2026	(Japan) Jogarbola	Công An Hà Nội
2026–present	(Japan) Mizuno	Công An Hà Nội

== Players ==
=== Current squad ===
As of 29 August 2026

Note: Flags indicate national team as defined under FIFA eligibility rules; some limited exceptions apply. Players may hold more than one non-FIFA nationality.

No.	Pos.	Nation	Player
1	GK	VIE	Nguyễn Filip
2	DF	VIE	Vũ Đức Huy
4	DF	VIE	Phan Ngọc Tín
5	DF	VIE	Đoàn Văn Hậu
6	MF	AUS	Stefan Mauk
7	DF	VIE	Cao Pendant Quang Vinh
8	FW	TOG	David Henen
9	FW	VIE	Nguyễn Đình Bắc
10	MF	BRA	Léo Artur
11	MF	VIE	Lê Phạm Thành Long
12	MF	VIE	Hoàng Văn Toản
14	MF	ESP	Damià Sabater
15	MF	VIE	Bùi Xuân Thịnh
17	DF	VIE	Vũ Văn Thanh

No.	Pos.	Nation	Player
18	FW	VIE	Đinh Thanh Bình
19	MF	VIE	Nguyễn Quang Hải (captain)
21	DF	VIE	Trần Đình Trọng
23	GK	VIE	Vũ Thành Vinh
26	DF	VIE	Hà Văn Phương
30	GK	VIE	Y Êli Niê
38	DF	VIE	Nguyễn Adou Leygley Minh
55	DF	IRQ	Frans Putros
68	DF	VIE	Bùi Hoàng Việt Anh (vice-captain)
72	FW	BRA	Alan Grafite
88	MF	VIE	Lê Văn Đô
90	FW	COL	Brayan Perea
93	DF	FRA	Kevin Pham Ba

=== Out on loan ===
Note: Flags indicate national team as defined under FIFA eligibility rules; some limited exceptions apply. Players may hold more than one non-FIFA nationality.

No.	Pos.	Nation	Player
3	DF	VIE	Phạm Lý Đức (on loan to Công An Nhân Dân until 1 July 2027)
20	FW	VIE	Phan Văn Đức (on loan to Công An HCMC until 1 July 2027)
22	MF	VIE	Phạm Minh Phúc (on loan to Công An Nhân Dân until 1 July 2027)

No.	Pos.	Nation	Player
27	MF	IRL	Brandon Ly (on loan to Xuân Thiện Phú Thọ until 1 July 2027)
36	DF	VIE	Hoàng Trung Anh (on loan to Hưng Yên until 1 July 2027)
60	GK	VIE	Hà Mạnh Trường (on loan to Quy Nhơn United until 1 July 2027)

== Former players ==
The players below had international caps for their respective countries or had significant contributions for the club. Players whose name is listed in bold had appeared with their country while playing for the team

Vietnam

- (Vietnam) **Bùi Hoàng Việt Anh**
- (Vietnam) Bùi Tiến Dũng
- (Vietnam) **Cao Pendant Quang Vinh**
- (Vietnam) Đinh Thanh Bình
- (Vietnam) **Đoàn Văn Hậu**
- (Vietnam) **Giáp Tuấn Dương**
- (Vietnam) **Hồ Tấn Tài**
- (Vietnam) **Hồ Văn Cường**
- (Vietnam) **Hoàng Văn Toản**
- (Vietnam) **Lã Xuân Thắng**
- (Vietnam) **Lê Anh Dũng**
- (Vietnam) **Lê Văn Đặng**
- (Vietnam) Lê Giang Patrik
- (Vietnam) Lê Minh Bình
- (Vietnam) **Lê Phạm Thành Long**
- (Vietnam) **Lê Văn Đô**
- (Vietnam) **Lưu Thanh Châu**
- (Vietnam) **Nguyễn Adou Leygley Minh**
- (Vietnam) **Nguyễn Đình Bắc**
- (Vietnam) Nguyễn Như Tuấn
- (Vietnam) **Nguyễn Filip**
- (Vietnam) **Nguyễn Ngọc Thơ**
- (Vietnam) **Nguyễn Quang Hải**
- (Vietnam) Nguyễn Tài Lộc
- (Vietnam) Nguyễn Trung Đại Dương
- (Vietnam) **Nguyễn Tuấn Thành**
- (Vietnam) Phạm Gia Hưng
- (Vietnam) Phạm Lý Đức
- (Vietnam) **Phạm Văn Luân**
- (Vietnam) **Phan Văn Đức**
- (Vietnam) Sầm Ngọc Đức
- (Vietnam) **Trần Đình Trọng**
- (Vietnam) **Từ Như Hiển**
- (Vietnam) **Vũ Minh Hiếu**
- (Vietnam) **Vũ Văn Thanh**

Foreign

- (Australia) Stefan Mauk
- (Brazil) Léo Artur
- (Brazil) China
- (Brazil) Jhon Cley
- (Brazil) Jeferson Elías
- (Brazil) Hugo Gomes
- (Brazil) Alan Grafite
- (Brazil) Gustavo Henrique
- (Brazil) Vitão
- (Republic of the Congo) Juvhel Tsoumou
- (France) Leygley Adou
- (Iran) Iman Alami
- (Kazakhstan) Naken Kyrykbaev
- (Nigeria) Raphael Success

== Management and staff ==
Position	Name
Chairman	(Vietnam) Nguyễn Tiến Đạt
Vice-chairman	(Vietnam) Trần Văn Hùng (Vietnam) Nguyễn Chí Công
Head of football operations	(Vietnam) Phạm Văn Lệ
Managing director	(Vietnam) Nguyễn Mạnh Cường
Head coach	(Brazil) Alexandré Pölking
Assistant coach	(Brazil) Marcelo Da Silva (Portugal) Paulo Mourinho (Vietnam) Phạm Thành Lương (Vietnam) Trần Minh Phúc
Goalkeeper coach	(Brazil) Valdir Bardi
Fitness coach	(Brazil) Paulo Oliveira
Doctor	(Vietnam) Nguyễn Văn Bổn
Physiotherapist	(Brazil) Jair José Junior (Vietnam) Lê Phụng Hiểu
Logistic officer	(Vietnam) Hồ Văn Lộc
Team manager	(Vietnam) Lê Xuân Hải
Head of delegation	(Vietnam) Nguyễn Minh Quang

== Managerial history ==
Name	Period	Achivements
(Vietnam) Tô Hiền	197?–197?	
(Vietnam) Nguyễn Minh Quang	197?–198?	
(Vietnam) Trần Đình Đức	198?–1993	1984 National A1 Championship
(Vietnam) Nguyễn Văn Nhã	1993–2002	1999 Dunhill Cup
(Vietnam) Mai Trần Hải	2008–2013	
(Vietnam) Nguyễn Đức Thắng	2013–2014	
(Vietnam) Phạm Minh Đức	2014–2015	
(Vietnam) Phan Bá Hùng	2015–2017	
(Vietnam) Nguyễn Văn Tuấn	2018–2020	
(Vietnam) Phạm Công Lộc	2021	
(Vietnam) Vũ Quang Bảo	2021–2022	
(Vietnam) Thạch Bảo Khanh	2022	2022 V.League 2
(Brazil) Paulo Foiani	2023	
(Brazil) Flavio Cruz	2023	2023 V.League 1
(Vietnam) Trần Tiến Đại (interim)	2023	
(South Korea) Gong Oh-kyun	2023–2024	
(Vietnam) Trần Tiến Đại (interim)	2024	
(Thailand) Kiatisuk Senamuang	2024	
(Brazil) Alexandré Pölking	2024–present	2024–25 Vietnamese Cup; 2025 Vietnamese Super Cup; 2025–26 V.League 1; 2026 Vietnamese Super Cup

== Honours ==
=== National competitions ===
- V.League 1

(gold) Winners (3): 1984, 2023, 2025–26
(silver) Runners-up (1): 1980
(bronze) Third place (4): 1981–82, 1989, 1999–2000, 2024-25

- Vietnamese Cup

(gold) Winners (1): 2024–25
(silver) Runners-up (2) : 1995, 2000–01

- Vietnamese Super Cup

(gold) Winners (2): 2025, 2026
(silver) Runners-up (1) : 2023

- V.League 2:

(gold) Winners (1): 2022

Former competitions

- North Vietnam Football Championship:

(gold) Winners (3): 1957, 1964, 1969
(silver) Runners-up (1): 1978
(bronze) Third place (1): 1967

- Dunhill Cup:

(gold) Winners (1): 1999
(silver) Runners-up (1): 1998

=== International competitions ===
==== Regional ====
- ASEAN Club Championship

(silver) Runners-up (1) : 2024–25

== Season by season record ==
Season	League											Cup
Season	Division	Played	Won	Draw	Lost	GF	GA	GD	Pts	Final position	Notes	Vietnamese National Cup
2000–01	V-League	18	6	6	6	22	19	+3	24	7th		Runner-up
2001–02	V-League	18	5	6	7	19	22	-3	21	8th		Semi-finals
2008	Third Division	5	4	1	0	13	4	+9	13	1st (Group A)	Promoted to Second Division	Ineligible for Vietnamese Cup
2009	Second Division	10	5	0	5	15	15	0	15	4th (Group A)		Ineligible for Vietnamese Cup
2010	Second Division	8	1	2	5	8	20	-12	5	5th (Group A)		Ineligible for Vietnamese Cup
2011	Second Division	10	1	3	6	7	20	-13	6	6th (Group A)	Initially relegated to Third Division but maintained after purchasing Hà Tĩnh's spot	Ineligible for Vietnamese Cup
2012	Second Division	8	1	3	4	4	13	-9	6	4th (Group A)		Ineligible for Vietnamese Cup
2013	Second Division	8	1	0	7	5	17	-12	3	5th (Group A)		Ineligible for Vietnamese Cup
2014	Second Division	4	1	1	2	3	3	0	4	2nd (Group A)	Promoted to V.League 2 after winning the promotion play-offs	Ineligible for Vietnamese Cup
2015	V.League 2	14	3	4	7	14	17	-3	13	8th	Relegated to Second Division	Round of 16
2016	Second Division	12	5	4	3	19	17	+2	19	2nd (Group A)		Ineligible for Vietnamese Cup
2017	Second Division	14	11	0	3	31	10	+24	33	1st (Group A)	Promoted to V.League 2 after winning the promotion play-offs	Ineligible for Vietnamese Cup
2018	V.League 2	18	4	3	11	15	27	-12	15	10th	Relegated to Second Division	Qualifying round
2019	Second Division	12	6	4	2	11	7	+4	22	3rd (Group A)		Ineligible for Vietnamese Cup
2020	Second Division	14	11	2	1	47	10	+37	35	2nd (Group B)	Defeated in the promotion play-offs but promoted to V.League 2 following Gia Định's withdrawal	Ineligible for Vietnamese Cup
2021	V.League 2	6	2	3	1	7	6	+1	9	6th	Competition abandoned due to COVID-19 pandemic	Competition abandoned due to COVID-19 pandemic
2022	V.League 2	22	12	7	3	37	15	+22	34	Champions	Promoted to V.League 1	Qualifying round
2023	V.League 1	20	11	5	4	39	21	+18	38	Champions	Qualified for the ASEAN Club Championship	Round of 16
2023–24	V.League 1	26	11	4	11	44	35	+9	37	6th		Round of 16
2024–25	V.League 1	26	12	9	5	45	23	+14	45	3rd	Qualified for the AFC Champions League Two & ASEAN Club Championship	Winners
2025–26	V.League 1	26	20	4	2	58	22	+36	64	Champions	Qualified for the AFC Champions League Elite & ASEAN Club Championship	Round of 16
2026–27	V.League 1	26										Round of 16

== Continental record ==
=== Continental ===
Season	Competition	Round	Club	Home	Away	Aggregate
2025–26	AFC Champions League Two	Group E	(China) Beijing Guoan	2–1	2–2	2nd out of 4
2025–26	AFC Champions League Two	Group E	(Hong Kong) Tai Po	3–0	0–1	2nd out of 4
2025–26	AFC Champions League Two	Group E	(Australia) Macarthur	1–1	1–2	2nd out of 4
2025–26	AFC Champions League Two	Round of 16	(Singapore) Tampines Rovers	0–3 FF (Note: Tampines Rovers were awarded a 0–3 victory by forfeit, after Công An Hà Nội fielded two ineligible players, Stefan Mauk and Rogério Alves. The score on the field was originally a 4–0 win by Công An Hà Nội.)	1–3	1–6
2026–27	AFC Champions League Elite	Preliminary round	(Australia) Adelaide United	2–0		
2026–27	AFC Champions League Elite	League stage	(Japan Football Association) Gamba Osaka	—N/a	1–4	
2026–27	AFC Champions League Elite	League stage	(Japan Football Association) Kashima Antlers	0–1	—N/a	
2026–27	AFC Champions League Elite	League stage	(Chinese Football Association) Shanghai Port	—N/a	3–2	
2026–27	AFC Champions League Elite	League stage	(Japan Football Association) Kyoto Sanga	0–0	—N/a	
2026–27	AFC Champions League Elite	League stage	(Japan Football Association) Vissel Kobe	–	—N/a	
2026–27	AFC Champions League Elite	League stage	(Japan Football Association) Kashiwa Reysol	—N/a	–	
2026–27	AFC Champions League Elite	League stage	(Chinese Football Association) Beijing Guoan	–	—N/a	
2026–27	AFC Champions League Elite	League stage	(Football Association of Malaysia) Johor Darul Ta'zim	—N/a	–	

=== Regional ===
Season	Competition	Round	Club	Home	Away	Aggregate
2024–25	ASEAN Club Championship	Group B	(Thailand) Buriram United	2–1	—N/a	1st out of 6
2024–25	ASEAN Club Championship	Group B	(Singapore) Lion City Sailors	5–0	—N/a	1st out of 6
2024–25	ASEAN Club Championship	Group B	(Philippines) Kaya–Iloilo	—N/a	2–1	1st out of 6
2024–25	ASEAN Club Championship	Group B	(Malaysia) Kuala Lumpur City	—N/a	3–2	1st out of 6
2024–25	ASEAN Club Championship	Group B	(Indonesia) Borneo Samarinda	3–2	—N/a	1st out of 6
2024–25	ASEAN Club Championship	Semi-finals	(Indonesia) PSM Makassar	2–0	0–1	2–1
2024–25	ASEAN Club Championship	Final	(Thailand) Buriram United	2–2	3–3 (a.e.t.) (2–3 p)	5–5 (a.e.t.) (2–3 p)
2025–26	ASEAN Club Championship	Group A	(Thailand) BG Pathum United	—N/a	1–2	4th out of 6
2025–26	ASEAN Club Championship	Group A	(Philippines) DH Cebu	1–0	—N/a	4th out of 6
2025–26	ASEAN Club Championship	Group A	(Thailand) Buriram United	—N/a	1–1	4th out of 6
2025–26	ASEAN Club Championship	Group A	(Malaysia) Selangor	—N/a	0–2	4th out of 6
2025–26	ASEAN Club Championship	Group A	(Singapore) Tampines Rovers	6–1	—N/a	4th out of 6
2026–27	ASEAN Club Championship	Group B	(Singapore) Lion City Sailors	—N/a	1–0	
2026–27	ASEAN Club Championship	Group B	(Malaysia) Johor Darul Ta'zim	1–3	—N/a	
2026–27	ASEAN Club Championship	Group B	(Cambodia) PKR Svay Rieng		—N/a	
2026–27	ASEAN Club Championship	Group B	(Myanmar) Shan United		—N/a	
2026–27	ASEAN Club Championship	Group B	(Indonesia) Persib	—N/a		
2026–27	ASEAN Club Championship	Group B	(Thailand) Port	—N/a		
