= Jason Pendant =

Vietnamese footballer

Jason Pendant Cao Pendant Quang Vinh
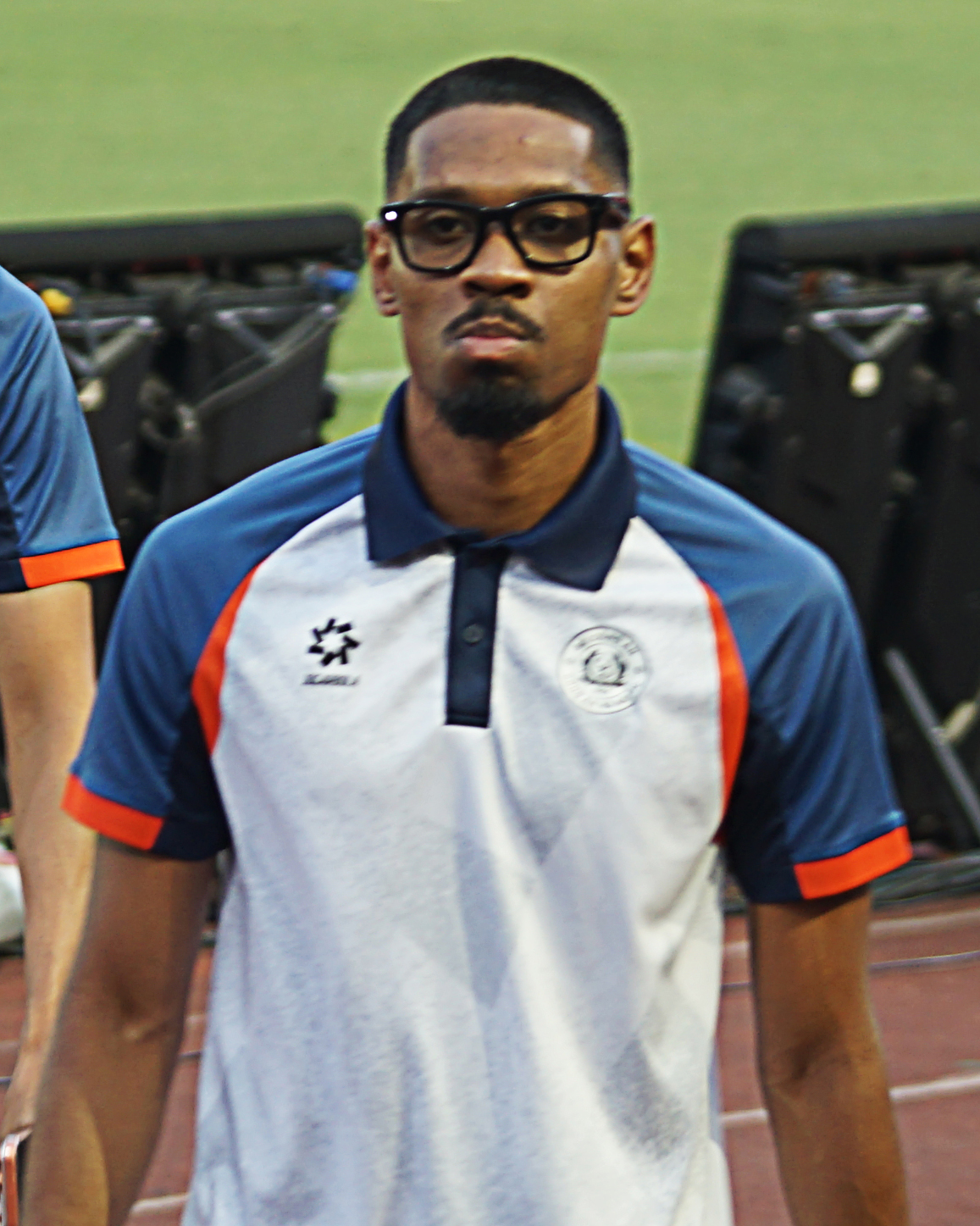
- Pendant in 2026

Personal information
- Full name: Cao Pendant Quang Vinh
- Birth name: Jason Quang-Vinh Pendant
- Date of birth: 9 February 1997 (age 29)
- Place of birth: Sarcelles, France
- Height: 1.77 m (5 ft 10 in)
- Position: Left-back

Team information
- Current team: Công An Hà Nội
- Number: 7

Youth career
- 2004–2006: Sarcelles AAS
- 2006–2007: ESM Le Thillay
- 2007–2011: Sarcelles AAS
- 2011–2014: Sochaux

Senior career*
Years	Team	Apps	(Gls)
2014–2019	Sochaux II	61	(1)
2016–2020	Sochaux	69	(1)
2020–2022	New York Red Bulls	27	(0)
2021–2022	New York Red Bulls II	18	(0)
2022–2024	Quevilly-Rouen	65	(0)
2024–	Công An Hà Nội	55	(1)

International career^{‡}
2012	France U16	16	(2)
2014	France U18	2	(0)
2025–	Vietnam	9	(0)
- * Club domestic league appearances and goals as of 7 November 2026 ‡ National team caps and goals as of 5 October 2026

Jason Quang-Vinh Pendant (born 9 February 1997), also known as Cao Pendant Quang Vinh, is a professional footballer who plays as a left-back for V.League 1 club Công An Hà Nội. Born in France, he plays for the Vietnam national team.

== Club career ==
=== Sochaux ===
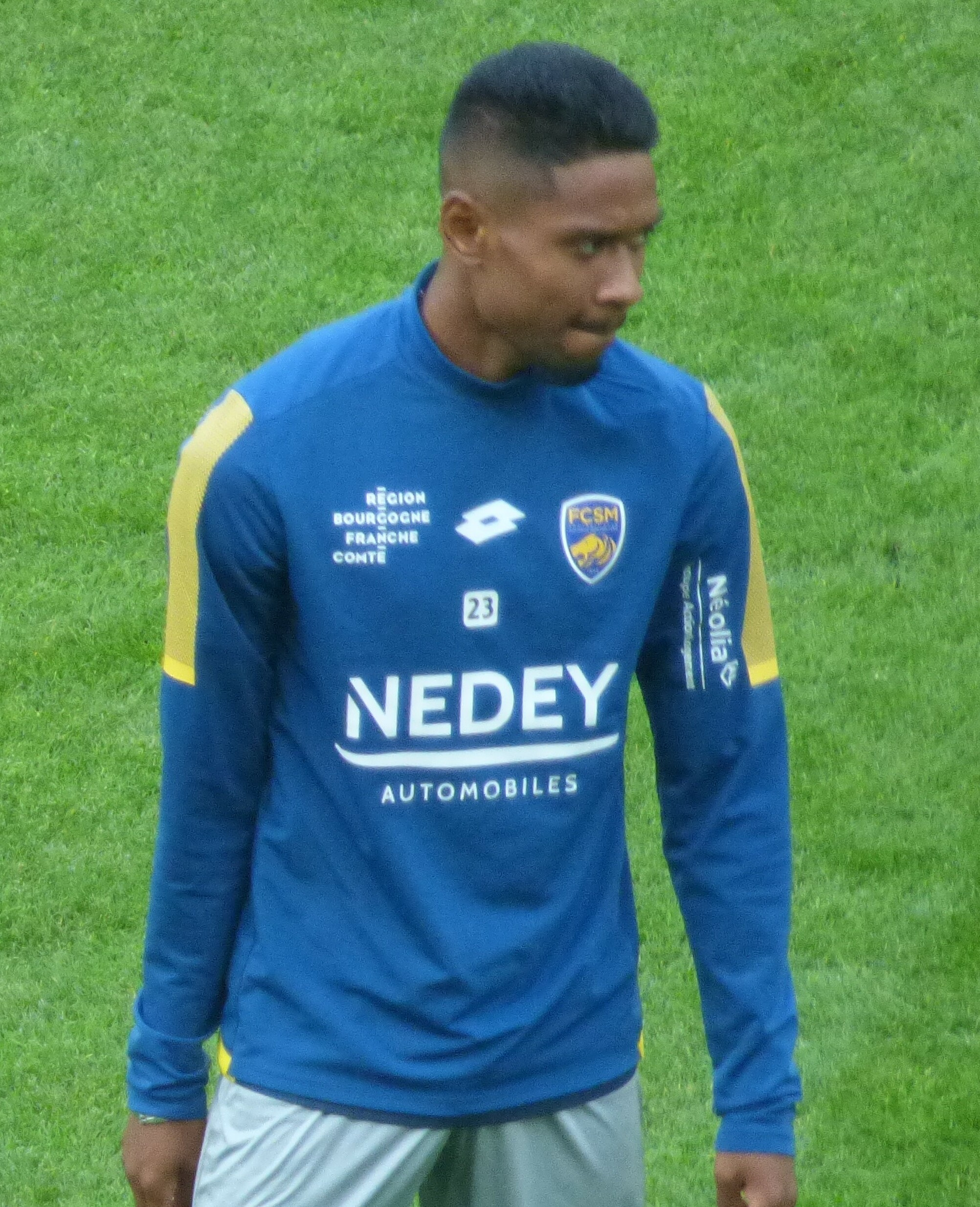
Pendant playing for Sochaux in 2018.

Born in Sarcelles, France, Pendant began his youth career with hometown club Sarcelles AAS before joining Sochaux. After playing in seven matches for the first team during the 2016–17 Ligue 2 season, Pendant signed his first professional contract with the club on 20 June 2017. He scored his first professional goal on 23 January 2018 in a 2–1 victory against Colomiers in the Coupe de France.

=== New York Red Bulls ===
On 10 March 2020, Pendant completed a transfer to MLS club, New York Red Bulls. On 11 July 2020, Pendant made his debut for New York in a 1–0 victory over Atlanta United. After featuring regularly for New York during the 2020 season, Pendant appeared mostly with New York Red Bulls II, making nine USL Championship appearances in 2021.

=== Quevilly-Rouen ===
On 12 July 2022, Pendant was transferred to Ligue 2 side Quevilly-Rouen for an undisclosed fee.

=== Công An Hà Nội ===
On 1 August 2024, Công An Hà Nội announced the signature of Pendant as a free agent, on a two-year contract deal.

On 5 May 2025, He scored his first goal for Công An Hà Nội as well as his first goal in the V-League 1, in a 3–0 win against Quảng Nam.

== International career ==
Pendant was born in France to a Martiniquais father and a Vietnamese mother, making him eligible for both national teams. He was a youth international player for France.

In 2019, Pendant expressed an interest in representing the Vietnam national team after the VFF reached out to him about the possibility of playing for them in the future.

In June 2025, Pendant received his first call up to the Vietnam national team for the 2027 Asian Cup qualifiers game against Malaysia.

== Personal life ==
On 19 March 2025, Pendant obtained his Vietnamese nationality with the Vietnamese personal name Cao Pendant Quang Vinh, as surname Cao is from his mother Cao Ngọc Châu.

On 9 June 2026, Pendant married his long-time girlfriend, Solange, in Danang. His wife is of French-Ghanaian descent. The couple already have two children.

== Career statistics ==
=== Club ===
As of match played 19 November 2026

Appearances and goals by club, season and competition
Club	Season	League			National cup (Note: Includes Coupe de France, U.S. Open Cup, Vietnamese Cup)		League cup (Note: Includes Coupe de la Ligue)		Continental		Other		Total	
Club	Season	Division	Apps	Goals	Apps	Goals	Apps	Goals	Apps	Goals	Apps	Goals	Apps	Goals
Sochaux II	2014–15	National 2	17	0	—		—		—		—		17	0
Sochaux II	2015–16	National 2	16	0	—		—		—		—		16	0
Sochaux II	2016–17	National 3	19	0	—		—		—		—		19	0
Sochaux II	2017–18	National 3	8	1	—		—		—		—		8	1
Sochaux II	2018–19	National 3	1	0	—		—		—		—		1	0
Sochaux II	2019–20	National 3	0	0	—		—		—		—		0	0
Sochaux II	Total		61	1	—		—		—		—		61	1
Sochaux	2016–17	Ligue 2	7	0	0	0	0	0	—		—		7	0
Sochaux	2017–18	Ligue 2	14	0	4	1	0	0	—		—		18	1
Sochaux	2018–19	Ligue 2	31	0	0	0	1	0	—		—		32	0
Sochaux	2019–20	Ligue 2	17	0	1	0	0	0	—		—		18	0
Sochaux	Total		69	0	5	1	1	0	—		—		75	1
New York Red Bulls	2020	MLS	20	0	0	0	1	0	—		—		21	0
New York Red Bulls	2021	MLS	2	0	0	0	0	0	—		—		2	0
New York Red Bulls	2022	MLS	5	0	1	0	0	0	—		—		6	0
New York Red Bulls	Total		27	0	1	0	1	0	—		—		29	0
New York Red Bulls II	2021	USL	9	0	0	0	0	0	—		—		9	0
New York Red Bulls II	2022	USL	9	0	0	0	0	0	—		—		8	0
New York Red Bulls II	Total		18	0	0	0	0	0	—		—		18	0
Quevilly-Rouen	2022–23	Ligue 2	32	0	0	0	—		—		—		32	0
Quevilly-Rouen	2023–24	Ligue 2	33	0	2	0	—		—		—		35	0
Quevilly-Rouen	Total		65	0	2	0	—		—		—		67	0
Công An Hà Nội	2024–25	V.League 1	24	1	4	0	—		—		9 (Note: Appearances in the ASEAN Club Championship)	1	37	2
Công An Hà Nội	2025–26	V.League 1	24	0	1	0	—		8 (Note: Appearances in the AFC Champions League Two)	0	4 (Note: One appearance in the Vietnamese Super Cup; three appearances and one goal in ASEAN Club Championship)	1	37	1
Công An Hà Nội	2026–27	V.League 1	7	0	0	0	—		5 (Note: Appearances in AFC Champions League Elite)	0	3 (Note: One appearance in Vietnamese Super Cup; two appearances in ASEAN Club Championship)	0	15	0
Công An Hà Nội	Total		55	1	5	0	—		13	0	16	2	89	3
Career total			295	2	13	1	2	0	13	0	16	2	339	5

=== International ===
As of match played 26 September 2026

Appearances and goals by national team and year
National team	Year	Apps	Goals
Vietnam	2025	4	0
Vietnam	2026	2	0
Total		6	0

== Honours ==
Công An Hà Nội

- V.League 1: 2025–26
- Vietnamese Cup: 2024–25
- Vietnamese Super Cup: 2025, 2026
- ASEAN Club Championship runner-up: 2024-25

Individual

- V.League 1 Team of the Season: 2024–25, 2025–26

== See also ==
- List of Vietnam footballers born outside Vietnam
