= Hiroki Kasahara =

Hiroki Kasahara may refer to:

- Hiroki Kasahara (kickboxer), Japanese kickboxer
- Hiroki Kasahara (referee), Japanese football referee
