= Hugo Gomes (footballer, born 1995) =

Brazilian footballer (born 1995)

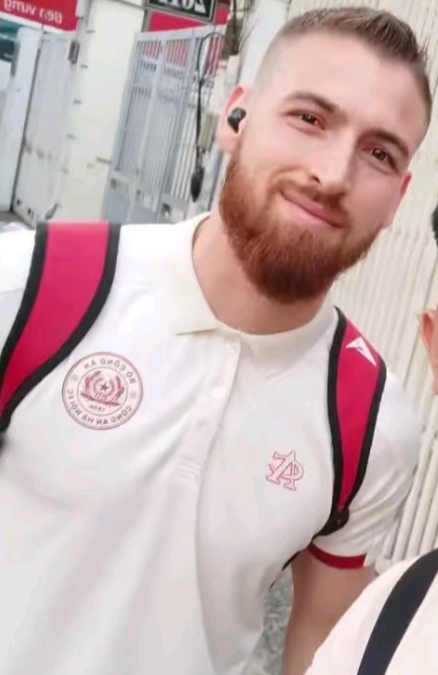
- Gomes in 2025

Personal information
- Full name: Hugo Domingos Gomes
- Date of birth: 4 January 1995 (age 31)
- Place of birth: Campo Grande, Brazil
- Height: 1.87 m (6 ft 2 in)
- Position: Centre-back

Team information
- Current team: Lion City Sailors
- Number: 3

Youth career
- 2000–2009: Los Angeles FC
- 2009–2015: São Paulo

Senior career*
Years	Team	Apps	(Gls)
2015–2018	São Paulo	0	(0)
2015–2016	→ Mallorca B (loan)	15	(0)
2016–2017	→ Granada B (loan)	19	(0)
2018	→ Atlético Goianiense (loan)	0	(0)
2018–2020	Famalicão	10	(1)
2019–2020	→ Varzim (loan)	19	(0)
2020–2021	Estoril	32	(4)
2021–2023	Rio Ave	23	(4)
2022–2023	→ Moreirense (loan)	27	(3)
2023	Suwon FC	15	(1)
2023–2024	Muaither	10	(1)
2024–2026	Cong An Hanoi	34	(5)
2026–	Lion City Sailors	2	(2)
- * Club domestic league appearances and goals as of 25 October 2026

Hugo Domingos Gomes (born 4 January 1995) is a Brazilian professional footballer who plays as a centre-back for Singapore Premier League team Lion City Sailors.

== Club career ==
Born in Campo Grande, Mato Grosso do Sul, Hugo Gomes started his career with Los Angeles FC in his hometown, aged only five. In 2008 he was invited for a trial at São Paulo FC, joining its youth setup in 2009 at the age of 13.

On 14 July 2015 Hugo Gomes renewed his contract until the end of 2017, being loaned to RCD Mallorca a day later. However, he only featured for the reserves in Tercera División.

On 24 August 2016, Hugo Gomes moved to another reserve team, Granada CF B in Segunda División B. After featuring sparingly, he returned to São Paulo, representing the B-side until the end of the year.

On 29 December 2017, Hugo Gomes joined Atlético Goianiense also in a temporary deal. The following 16 July, after being rarely used, he agreed to a three-year deal with LigaPro side F.C. Famalicão.

Hugo Gomes made his professional debut on 11 August 2018, starting in a 0–1 away loss against S.C. Farense. He made just nine more appearances as they were promoted to Primeira Liga as runners-up, and scored in a 4–2 home comeback win over FC Porto B on 27 October.

Hugo Gomes returned to the second tier on loan for 2019–20, at Varzim SC. He played 22 total games while in Póvoa de Varzim, and scored once to equalise in a 2–1 loss away to eventual double winners FC Porto in the quarter-finals of the Taça de Portugal on 14 January.

On 13 July 2021, he moved to Rio Ave on a two-year contract. On 3 August 2022, Gomes joined Moreirense on a season-long loan.

In July 2023, Gomes was sold to South Korean K League 1 club Suwon FC.

In August 2024, he joined V.League 1 side Cong An Hanoi.

In July 2026, he joined Singapore Premier League club Lion City Sailors.

== Career statistics ==
As of 1 July 2026

Appearances and goals by club, season and competition
Club	Season	League			State league		National cup		League cup		Continental		Other		Total	
Club	Season	Division	Apps	Goals	Apps	Goals	Apps	Goals	Apps	Goals	Apps	Goals	Apps	Goals	Apps	Goals
Atlético Goianiense (loan)	2018	Série B	—		3	0	1	0	—		—		—		4	0
Famalicão	2018–19	Liga Portugal 2	10	1	—		0	0	0	0	—		—		10	1
Famalicão	2019–20	Primeira Liga	0	0	—		0	0	—		—		—		0	0
Famalicão	Total		10	1	0	0	0	0	0	0	0	0	0	0	10	1
Varzim (loan)	2019–20	Liga Portugal 2	19	0	—		3	1	—		—		—		22	1
Estoril	2020–21	Liga Portugal 2	32	4	—		6	2	1	0	—		—		39	6
Rio Ave	2021–22	Liga Portugal 2	23	4	—		3	1	3	0	—		—		29	5
Moreirense (loan)	2022–23	Liga Portugal 2	27	3	—		2	1	2	0	—		—		31	4
Suwon FC	2023	K League 1	15	1	—		—		—		—		2	0	17	1
Muaither	2023–24	Qatar Stars League	10	1	0	0	1	0	0	0	0	0	0	0	11	1
Cong An Hanoi	2024–25	V.League 1	23	5	0	0	5	1	0	0	0	0	9	1	37	7
Cong An Hanoi	2025–26	V.League 1	11	0	0	0	1	0	0	0	7	0	5	1	24	1
Cong An Hanoi	Total		34	5	0	0	6	1	0	0	7	0	14	1	61	8
Career total			170	19	3	0	22	6	6	0	7	0	16	1	224	27

== Honours ==
Estoril

- Liga Portugal 2: 2020–21

Rio Ave

- Liga Portugal 2: 2021–22

Moreirense

- Liga Portugal 2: 2022–23

Công An Hà Nội

- V.League 1: 2025–26
- Vietnamese National Cup: 2024–25
- Vietnamese Super Cup: 2025
- ASEAN Club Championship runner-up: 2024–25

Individual

- Liga Portugal 2 Defender of the Month: September 2022
