= Peter Žulj =

Austrian footballer (born 1993)

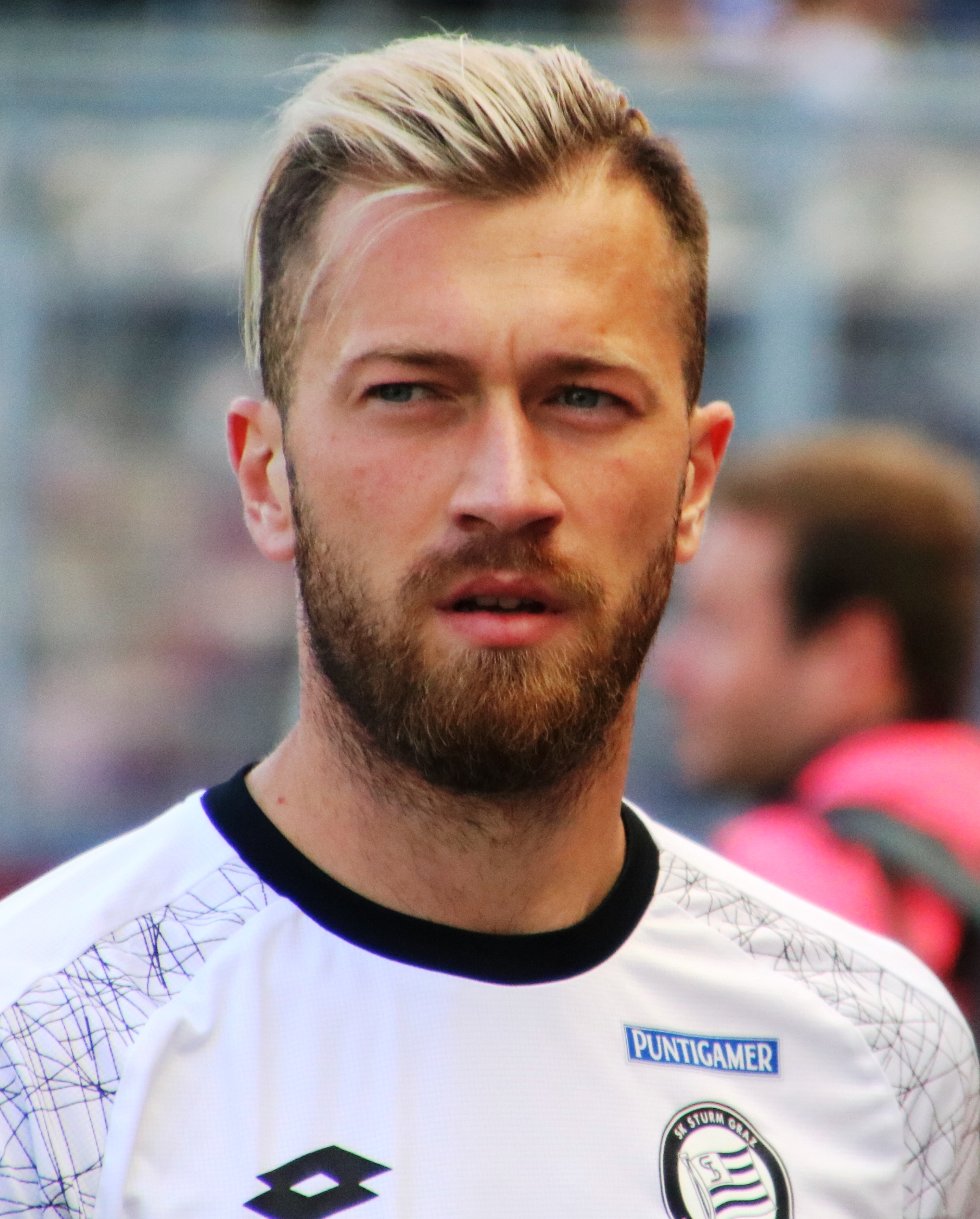
- Žulj with Sturm Graz in 2018

Personal information
- Full name: Peter Antonio Žulj
- Date of birth: 9 June 1993 (age 33)
- Place of birth: Wels, Upper Austria, Austria
- Height: 1.85 m (6 ft 1 in)
- Position: Midfielder

Team information
- Current team: Buriram United
- Number: 44

Youth career
- 1999–2007: Wels
- 2007–2008: Red Bull Salzburg
- 2008–2010: Rapid Wien

Senior career*
Years	Team	Apps	(Gls)
2010–2014	SK Rapid Wien II	39	(11)
2011–2012	→ Grödig (loan)	7	(0)
2013–2014	→ Hartberg (loan)	17	(2)
2014–2015	Wolfsberger AC	46	(7)
2015–2016	Admira Wacker	8	(1)
2016–2017	Ried	33	(6)
2017–2018	Sturm Graz	50	(13)
2019–2021	Anderlecht	40	(0)
2021	→ Göztepe (loan)	16	(4)
2021–2022	İstanbul Başakşehir	7	(0)
2022	→ Fehérvár (loan)	13	(3)
2022–2024	Changchun Yatai	61	(12)
2025–	Buriram United	12	(0)

International career^{‡}
2009	Austria U17	3	(0)
2011	Austria U19	1	(0)
2014	Austria U21	1	(0)
2018–2020	Austria	11	(0)
- * Club domestic league appearances and goals as of 4 November 2023 ‡ National team caps and goals as of 24 March 2019

Peter Antonio Žulj (Croatian pronunciation: [ʒûːʎ]; born 9 June 1993) is an Austrian professional footballer who plays as a midfielder for Thai League 1 club Buriram United, and the Austria national team.

== Career ==
Žulj was developed by the youth system of Rapid Wien, but he never appeared for the club's first team. After loan spells in the Austrian Football First League with Grödig and Hartberg, he joined Austrian Football Bundesliga side Wolfsberger AC in January 2014.

On 9 May 2018, he played in the game in which Sturm Graz beat Red Bull Salzburg in extra time to win the 2017–18 Austrian Cup.

In January 2019, he signed a 3.5 years contract with Anderlecht. On 11 January 2021, he was loaned to Turkish Süper Lig club Göztepe.

On 23 June 2021, he signed a 3 years with İstanbul Başakşehir. On 12 January 2022, he was loaned to Hungarian Nemzeti Bajnokság I club Fehérvár.

On 1 September 2022, Žulj joined Chinese Super League club Changchun Yatai.

== International career ==
In February 2014, Žulj was called up the Austria under-21 squad for the first time.

He debuted for the senior Austria national football team in a friendly 4–0 win over Luxembourg on 27 March 2018.

== Personal life ==
Žulj was born in Wels, Austria and is of Burgenland Croatian descent. Peter Žulj is the younger brother of Robert Žulj, who is also a professional footballer.

== Career statistics ==
As of match played 13 Apr 26.

Appearances and goals by club, season and competition
Club	Season	League			Cup		League cup		Continental		Other		Total	
Club	Season	Division	Apps	Goals	Apps	Goals	Apps	Goals	Apps	Goals	Apps	Goals	Apps	Goals
Grödig (loan)	2012–13	Austrian Football First League	7	0	0	0	—		—		—		7	0
Hartberg (loan)	2013–14	Austrian Football First League	17	2	2	1	—		—		—		19	3
Wolfsberger AC	2013–14	Austrian Bundesliga	13	2	1	0	—		—		—		14	2
Wolfsberger AC	2014–15	Austrian Bundesliga	27	5	3	2	—		—		—		30	7
Wolfsberger AC	2015–16	Austrian Bundesliga	6	0	2	1	—		—		—		8	1
Wolfsberger AC	Total		46	7	5	3	—		—		—		52	10
Admira Wacker	2015–16	Austrian Bundesliga	8	1	1	0	—		—		—		9	1
Ried	2016–17	Austrian Bundesliga	33	6	2	0	—		—		—		35	6
Sturm Graz	2017–18	Austrian Bundesliga	33	8	5	2	—		4	0	—		42	10
Sturm Graz	2018–19	Austrian Bundesliga	17	5	2	0	—		4	0	—		23	5
Sturm Graz	Total		50	13	7	2	—		8	0	—		65	15
Anderlecht	2018–19	Belgian Pro League	10	0	0	0	—		—		—		10	0
Anderlecht	2019–20	Belgian Pro League	22	0	0	0	—		—		—		22	0
Anderlecht	2020–21	Belgian Pro League	8	0	0	0	—		—		—		8	0
Anderlecht	Total		40	0	0	0	—		—		—		40	0
Göztepe (loan)	2020–21	Süper Lig	16	4	0	0	—		—		—		16	4
İstanbul Başakşehir	2021–22	Süper Lig	7	0	0	0	—		—		—		7	0
Fehérvár (loan)	2021–22	Nemzeti Bajnokság I	13	3	1	0	—		—		—		14	3
Changchun Yatai	2022	Chinese Super League	10	1	0	0	—		—		—		10	1
Changchun Yatai	2023	Chinese Super League	27	6	0	0	—		—		—		27	6
Changchun Yatai	2024	Chinese Super League	24	5	1	0	—		—		—		25	5
Changchun Yatai	Total		61	12	1	0	—		—		—		62	12
Buriram United	2024–25	Thai League 1	—		3	0	2	1	4	0	4	2	13	3
Buriram United	2025–26	Thai League 1	22	1	0	0	2	0	9	0	4	1	37	2
Buriram United	Total		22	1	3	0	4	1	13	0	8	3	50	5
Career Total			320	49	22	6	4	1	21	0	8	3	425	61

== Honours ==
Sturm Graz

- Austrian Cup: 2017–18

Buriram United

- Thai League 1: 2025–26
- Thai FA Cup: 2024–25
- Thai League Cup: 2024–25
- ASEAN Club Championship: 2024–25, 2025–26

Individual

- Austrian Bundesliga Team of the Year: 2017–18
- ASEAN Club Championship: Allstar XI 2025–26
