= Pablo (footballer, born 1996) =

Brazilian footballer

Personal information
- Full name: Pablo Augusto Servo de Carvalho
- Date of birth: 19 April 1996 (age 30)
- Place of birth: Rio de Janeiro, Brazil
- Height: 1.84 m (6 ft 0 in)
- Position: Forward

Youth career
- –2011: Vasco da Gama
- 2011–2013: Fluminense
- 2013–2016: Audax Rio
- 2015–2016: → Audax (loan)

Senior career*
Years	Team	Apps	(Gls)
2016–2018	Audax Rio	5	(0)
2016	→ Ryukyu (loan)	21	(7)
2017	→ Kataller Toyama (loan)	9	(0)
2018	Almirante Barroso	0	(0)
2019	Jequié	9	(5)
2019–2020	ASA	2	(0)
2020	Penapolense	1	(0)
2020–2023	Serrano	35	(16)
2021	→ Sampaio Corrêa (loan)	5	(0)
2022	→ Boavista (loan)	4	(1)
2022	→ America-RJ (loan)	7	(1)
2023	→ Boavista (loan)	6	(2)
2023	→ Iporá (loan)	14	(5)
2023–2024	Naxxar Lions	24	(10)
2024–2025	Preah Khan Reach Svay Rieng	14	(12)
- * Club domestic league appearances and goals as of 8 January 2026

Pablo Augusto Servo de Carvalho (born 16 October 1996), simply known as Pablo, is a Brazilian footballer who plays as a forward.

== Club statistics ==
Updated to 23 February 2016.

Club performance			League		Cup		Total	
Season	Club	League	Apps	Goals	Apps	Goals	Apps	Goals
Japan			League		Emperor's Cup		Total	
2016	FC Ryukyu	J3 League	21	7	2	0	23	7
Career total			21	7	2	0	23	7
