= Lucas Crispim =

Brazilian footballer (born 1994)

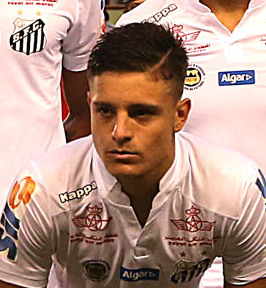
- Crispim with Santos in 2016

Personal information
- Full name: Lucas de Figueiredo Crispim
- Date of birth: 19 June 1994 (age 32)
- Place of birth: Brasília, Brazil
- Height: 1.78 m (5 ft 10 in)
- Positions: Attacking midfielder; winger

Team information
- Current team: Fortaleza
- Number: 10

Youth career
- 2005: Genoma Colorado
- 2005: Internacional-DF
- 2006: CFZ-DF
- 2007–2014: Santos

Senior career*
Years	Team	Apps	(Gls)
2014–2017	Santos	10	(0)
2014	→ Vasco da Gama (loan)	12	(2)
2015	→ Joinville (loan)	20	(0)
2016	→ Atlético Goianiense (loan)	7	(0)
2017	→ Ituano (loan)	13	(0)
2018	São Bento	26	(0)
2019–2021	Guarani	67	(6)
2021–2023	Fortaleza	102	(8)
2024–2025	Buriram United	38	(11)
2025–	Fortaleza	24	(1)
- * Club domestic league appearances and goals as of 15 April 2026

Lucas de Figueiredo Crispim (born 19 June 1994) is a Brazilian professional footballer who plays as an attacking midfielder or a winger for Fortaleza.

== Club career ==
Born in Brasília, Federal District, Crispim joined Santos FC's youth setup in 2007, aged 13. On 12 August 2013 he signed a new deal with the club, running until December 2016.

In January 2014 Crispim suffered a thigh injury, being sidelined for a month. On 7 May he was loaned to Série B side Vasco da Gama until December.

Crispim made his professional debut on 12 August, starting in a 1–0 away win against Náutico. He scored his first goal on 3 October, netting his side's first of a 2–2 home draw against Bragantino, and finished the campaign with 12 appearances and two goals, as the Cruz-Maltino returned to Série A at first attempt.

On 6 January 2015 Crispim returned to Peixe. He made his debut for the club on 1 February, coming on as a late substitute for Robinho in a 3–0 home win against Ituano.

On 18 June 2015 Crispim was loaned to fellow top division club Joinville, until the end of the year. Returning to Santos in January 2016, he appeared rarely before serving another loan stint at second tier side Atlético Goianiense; he also appeared rarely with the club, which achieved promotion as champions.

On 9 February 2017, after being demoted to the B-team upon returning from loan, Crispim joined Ituano also in a temporary deal. On 14 December, after again featuring rarely, he signed a one-year deal with São Bento.

On 7 January 2019, Guarani confirmed the signing of Crispim.

== Career statistics ==
As of 7 December 2025

Club	Season	League			State League		Cup		Continental		Other		Total	
Club	Season	Division	Apps	Goals	Apps	Goals	Apps	Goals	Apps	Goals	Apps	Goals	Apps	Goals
Vasco da Gama (loan)	2014	Série B	12	2	—		1	0	—		—		13	2
Santos	2015	Série A	0	0	5	0	2	0	—		—		7	0
Santos	2016	Série A	1	0	1	0	2	0	—		—		4	0
Santos	2017	Série A	3	0	—		—		—		—		3	0
Santos	Subtotal		4	0	6	0	4	0	—		—		14	0
Joinville (loan)	2015	Série A	20	0	—		0	0	1 (Note: Appearance(s) in Copa Sudamericana)	0	—		21	0
Atlético Goianiense (loan)	2016	Série B	7	0	—		0	0	—		—		7	0
Ituano (loan)	2017	Série D	0	0	13	0	—		—		—		13	0
São Bento	2018	Série B	12	0	14	0	—		—		—		26	0
Guarani	2019	Série B	17	2	7	0	1	0	—		—		25	2
Guarani	2020	Série B	31	4	12	0	0	0	—		—		43	4
Guarani	Total		48	6	19	0	1	0	—		—		68	6
Fortaleza	2021	Série A	26	1	7	4	8	0	—		6 (Note: Appearance(s) in Copa do Nordeste)	0	47	5
Fortaleza	2022	Série A	23	1	7	0	9	0	—		7	0	46	1
Fortaleza	2023	Série A	17	1	5	1	4	0	6	1	5	1	37	4
Fortaleza	Total		66	3	19	5	21	0	6	1	18	1	130	10
Buriram United	2023–24	Thai League 1	12	2	1	1	1	0	0	0	—		14	3
Buriram United	2024–25	Thai League 1	26	9	2	0	5	0	18 (Note: Eleven appearances in AFC Champions League Elite, seven appearances and five goals in ASEAN Club Championship)	5	—		51	14
Buriram United	Total		38	11	3	1	6	0	18	5	0	0	65	17
Fortaleza	2025	Série A	10	1	—		—		—		—		10	1
Career total			139	10	59	4	14	0	25	6	6	0	183	10

== Honours ==
Santos

- Campeonato Paulista: 2015, 2016

Atlético Goianiense

- Campeonato Brasileiro Série B: 2016

Fortaleza

- Campeonato Cearense: 2021, 2022, 2023, 2026
- Copa do Nordeste: 2022

Buriram United

- Thai League: 2023–24, 2024–25
- Thai FA Cup: 2024–25
- Thai League Cup: 2024–25
- ASEAN Club Championship: 2024–25

Individual

- ASEAN Club Championship: Top scorer 2024–25 (shared)
- ASEAN Club Championship: Most Valuable Player 2024–25
- ASEAN Club Championship: Allstar XI 2024–25
