= Lê Văn Đô =

Vietnamese footballer

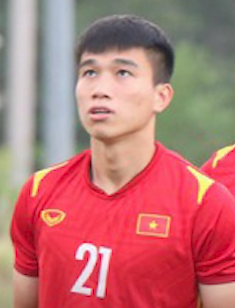
- Lê Văn Đô in 2022

Personal information
- Full name: Lê Văn Đô
- Date of birth: 7 August 2001 (age 25)
- Place of birth: Tam Kỳ, Quảng Nam, Vietnam
- Height: 1.73 m (5 ft 8 in)
- Position: Winger

Team information
- Current team: Công An Hà Nội
- Number: 88

Youth career
- 2012–2014: SHB Đà Nẵng
- 2015–2019: PVF

Senior career*
Years	Team	Apps	(Gls)
2019–2024	PVF-CAND	40	(5)
2021	→ SHB Đà Nẵng (loan)	3	(0)
2023	→ Công An Hà Nội (loan)	16	(3)
2024–	Công An Hà Nội	51	(5)

International career^{‡}
2021–2024	Vietnam U23	30	(3)
2024–	Vietnam	4	(0)
Medal record
Men's football
Representing Vietnam
SEA Games
Gold medal – first place	Hanoi 2021	Team
Bronze medal – third place	Phnom Penh 2023	Team
- * Club domestic league appearances and goals as of 22 October 2026 ‡ National team caps and goals as of 5 October 2026

Lê Văn Đô (born 7 August 2001) is a Vietnamese professional footballer who plays as a winger for V.League 1 club Công An Hà Nội and the Vietnam national team.

== International career ==
Văn Đô was named in Vietnam's preliminary squad for the 2023 AFC Asian Cup but was not included in the final list. He made his international debut in the friendly game against Kyrgyzstan on 9 January 2024.

=== International goals ===
==== U-23 ====
#	Date	Venue	Opponent	Score	Result	Competition
1.	6 May 2022	Phú Thọ, Vietnam	Indonesia	3–0	3–0	2021 Southeast Asian Games
2.	6 September 2023	Phú Thọ, Vietnam	Guam	1–0	6–0	2024 AFC U-23 Asian Cup qualification

== Honours ==
Công An Hà Nội

- V.League 1: 2023, 2025–26
- Vietnamese Cup: 2024–25
- Vietnamese Super Cup: 2025, 2026
- ASEAN Club Championship runner-up: 2024–25

Vietnam U-23

- SEA Games Gold medal: 2021

Vietnam

- ASEAN Championship: 2026

Individual

- ASEAN Club Championship All-Star XI: 2024–25
