= Léo Artur =

Brazilian footballer (born 1995)

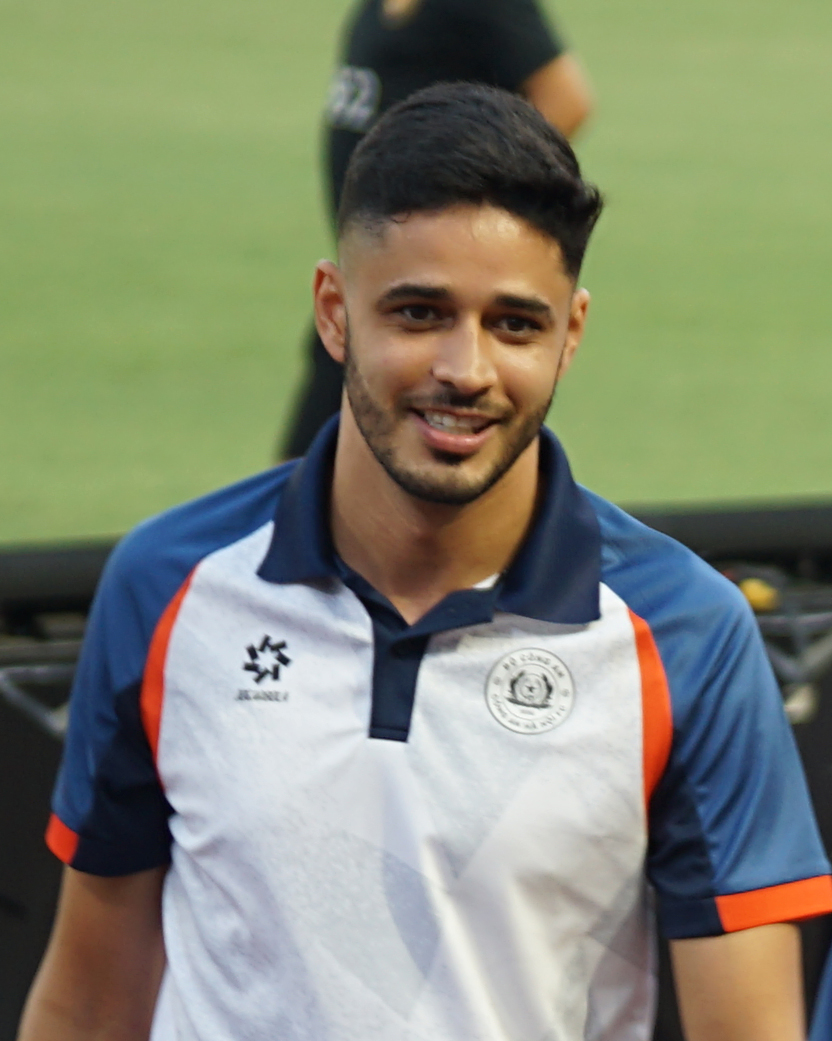
- Léo Artur in 2026

Personal information
- Full name: Leonardo Artur de Melo
- Date of birth: 23 March 1995 (age 31)
- Place of birth: Osasco, Brazil
- Height: 1.77 m (5 ft 10 in)
- Positions: Attacking midfielder; winger

Team information
- Current team: Cong An Hanoi
- Number: 10

Youth career
- 2011–2013: Corinthians

Senior career*
Years	Team	Apps	(Gls)
2013–2018	Corinthians	7	(0)
2014	→ Guarani (loan)	5	(0)
2014–2015	→ Penapolense (loan)	12	(3)
2015	→ Paysandu (loan)	6	(1)
2016	→ Mogi Mirim (loan)	12	(2)
2016	→ Oeste (loan)	35	(4)
2017	→ Osasco Audax (loan)	12	(2)
2017–2018	Ponte Preta	34	(2)
2018	Oeste	13	(0)
2018–2020	Ferroviária	18	(2)
2019	→ Fluminense (loan)	7	(0)
2019	→ Sport (loan)	5	(0)
2020	Mirassol	8	(1)
2020	Figueirense	6	(1)
2021	Oeste	26	(6)
2021–2022	Sampaio Corrêa	12	(3)
2022	Londrina	7	(0)
2022–2023	Figueirense	47	(8)
2023–2024	Quy Nhon Binh Dinh	23	(8)
2024–	Cong An Hanoi	40	(20)
- * Club domestic league appearances and goals as of 7 June 2026

Leonardo "Léo" Artur de Melo (born 23 March 1995) is a Brazilian professional footballer who plays as an attacking midfielder or winger for V.League 1 club Cong An Ha Noi.

== Career ==
=== Corinthians ===
Léo began his career in the youth squad of Corinthians. He was part of the squad that won the Copa São Paulo de Futebol Júnior in 2012. He was called up by then manager Tite to integrate the main team of Corinthians in 2013.

=== Quy Nhon Binh Dinh ===
In October 2023, Léo joined Vietnamese side Quy Nhon Binh Dinh. He scored a goal on his league debut for Quy Nhon Binh Dinh against Hanoi Police on 22 October 2023, scoring in the 38th minute. He scored 8 goals during the 2023–24 V.League 1 season, playing a crucial role in Quy Nhon Binh Dinh runners-up campaign.

=== Cong An Hanoi ===
On 13 August 2024, Léo signed for V.League 1 fellow Cong An Hanoi.

== Career statistics ==
As of matches played on 7 June 2026

Club	Season	League			State League		Cup		Continental		Other		Total	
Club	Season	Division	Apps	Goals	Apps	Goals	Apps	Goals	Apps	Goals	Apps	Goals	Apps	Goals
Corinthians	2013	Série A	5	0	2	0	1	0	0	0	0	0	8	0
Corinthians	2017	Série A	0	0	0	0	0	0	0	0	—		0	0
Corinthians	Total		5	0	2	0	1	0	0	0	0	0	8	0
Guarani (loan)	2014	Série C	1	0	4	0	—		—		—		5	0
Penapolense (loan)	2014	Série D	3	0	—		—		—		—		3	0
Penapolense (loan)	2015	Campeonato Paulista	—		9	3	—		—		—		9	3
Penapolense (loan)	Total		3	0	9	3	0	0	0	0	0	0	12	3
Paysandu (loan)	2015	Série B	6	1	—		—		—		—		6	1
Mogi Mirim (loan)	2016	Campeonato Paulista	—		12	2	—		—		—		12	2
Oeste (loan)	2016	Série B	35	4	—		—		—		—		35	4
Osasco Audax (loan)	2017	Campeonato Paulista	—		12	2	2	1	—		—		14	3
Ponte Preta	2017	Série A	22	1	—		—		—		—		22	1
Ponte Preta	2018	Campeonato Paulista	—		12	1	2	0	—		—		14	1
Ponte Preta	Total		22	1	12	1	2	0	0	0	0	0	36	2
Oeste	2018	Série B	13	0	—		—		—		—		13	0
Ferroviária	2018	Série D	—		—		—		—		13 (Note: Appearances in Copa Paulista)	5	13	5
Ferroviária	2019	Campeonato Paulista	—		9	2	—		—		—		9	2
Ferroviária	2020	Campeonato Paulista	—		9	0	3	0	—		—		12	0
Ferroviária	Total		0	0	18	2	3	0	0	0	13	5	34	7
Fluminense (loan)	2019	Série A	7	0	—		3	0	—		—		10	0
Sport (loan)	2019	Série B	5	0	—		—		—		—		5	0
Mirassol	2020	Série D	8	1	—		—		—		—		8	1
Figueirense	2020	Série B	6	1	—		—		—		—		6	1
Oeste	2021	Série C	12	1	14	5	—		—		—		26	6
Sampaio Corrêa	2021	Série B	12	3	—		—		—		—		12	3
Londrina	2022	Campeonato Paranaense	—		7	0	1	0	—		—		8	0
Figueirense	2022	Série C	21	6	4	0	—		—		4 (Note: Appearances in Copa Santa Catarina)	1	29	7
Figueirense	2023	Série C	16	2	6	0	0	0	—		2	1	24	3
Figueirense	Total		37	8	10	0	0	0	0	0	6	2	53	10
Quy Nhon Binh Dinh	2023–24	V.League 1	23	8	—		1	0	—		—		24	8
Cong An Hanoi	2024–25	V.League 1	20	10	—		3	1	—		6 (Note: Appearances in ASEAN Club Championship)	6	29	17
Cong An Hanoi	2025–26	V.League 1	20	10	—		1	0	7 (Note: Appearances in AFC Champions League Two)	0	6 (Note: One appearance and one goal in Vietnamese Super Cup; five appearances and one goal in ASEAN Club Championship)	2	34	12
Cong An Hanoi	Total		40	20	0	0	4	1	7	0	12	8	63	29
Career total			235	48	100	15	18	2	7	0	31	15	390	80

== Honours ==
Corinthians

- Campeonato Paulista: 2013

Cong An Hanoi

- V.League 1: 2025–26
- Vietnamese National Cup: 2024–25
- Vietnamese Super Cup: 2025, 2026
- ASEAN Club Championship runner-up: 2024–25

Individual

- ASEAN Club Championship top scorer: 2024–25 (joint)
- ASEAN Club Championship All-Star XI: 2024–25
