= 2028 SAFF Club Championship =

Association football tournament in South Asia

Tournament details
- Host country: N/A
- Dates: TBA
- Teams: 8 (from 7 associations)

The 2028 SAFF Club Championship is the proposed inaugural edition of the SAFF Club Championship, an international men's club football championship of South Asian countries organised by the South Asian Football Federation (SAFF). It was stalled for over a decade due to lack of sponsors.

== Format ==
Initially, a centralized venue was planned for the tournament. Eventually, a home-and-away format was finalized as the AIFF expressed reservations over allotting two weeks during the regular Indian football calendar. It was planned to be held in 2024, but postponed to 2026.

In June 2026, General Secretary of the SAFF Purushottam Kattel stated that the tournament was unlikely to take place in the year and likely to be postponed till 2028.

== Association team allocation ==
8 teams from 7 SAFF member associations will participate in the 2028 SAFF Club Championship. The association ranking based on the AFC member association coefficient rankings is used to determine the number of participating teams for each association. This will include two teams from India and one team from Maldives, Nepal, Bhutan, Pakistan, Bangladesh and Sri Lanka.

| SAFF rank | Member association | Slots |
|---|---|---|
| 1 | India | 2 |
| 2 | Bangladesh | 1 |
| 3 | Maldives | 1 |
| 4 | Nepal | 1 |
| 5 | Sri Lanka | 1 |
| 6 | Bhutan | 1 |
| 7 | Pakistan | 1 |
| Total | Participating associations: 7 | 8 |

== Bracket ==
The matches will be played in home and away knockout format.

Quarterfinals
1
8
5
4
3
6
7
2

Semifinals

Finals

== Quarter-finals ==
| Team 1 | Agg. | Team 2 | 1st leg | 2nd leg |

== Semi-finals ==
| Team 1 | Agg. | Team 2 | 1st leg | 2nd leg |

== Final ==
| Team 1 | Agg. | Team 2 | 1st leg | 2nd leg |
