= ASEAN Club Championship =

- Organiser(s): AFF
- Founded: 2003; 23 years ago
- Region: Southeast Asia
- Teams: 14 (group stage); 16 (total)
- Current champions: (Thailand) Buriram United (2nd title)
- Most championships: (Thailand) Buriram United (2 titles)
- Website: aseanutdfc.com
- 2026–27 ASEAN Club Championship

The ASEAN Club Championship (ACC), also known as the Shopee Cup for sponsorship reasons, is an international club football competition organised by the ASEAN Football Federation (AFF) between regional clubs. The competition is backed by AFC and FIFA.

== History ==
ASEAN Champions' Cup, first held in 1984, served as the qualifier for the Asian Club Championship. Bangkok Bank became the first champion. The ASEAN Club Championship was held as biannual tournament in 2003 and 2005. The first edition was sponsored by the LG Electronics, also known as the LG Cup ASEAN Club Football Championship. However, the tournament failed to gain traction due to lack of sponsors and conflict with the main calendar of the Asian Football Confederation. Plans to revive the tournament started as early as 2012. The tournament's revival was again proposed in 2019, but was hampered by the COVID-19 pandemic. The tournament was revived in April 2024 for the 2024–25 edition, with a new title sponsor Shopee.

== Competition format and regulations ==
The format of the ASEAN Club Championship was the same as the AFC Cup, each national association in Southeast Asia sending their champion club representing the domestic league. The participating clubs were split into several groups in a round-robin format. The winners and runners-up advanced to quarter-finals or semi-finals.

The format of the ASEAN Club Championship includes qualifying round play-offs, a group stage and a knock-out stage consisting of semi-finals and the final.

Season	No. of nations	No. of clubs	Notes
2003	11	11	Two weeks tournament
2005	8	8	Two weeks tournament
2022	Cancelled		
2024–25	10	14	Full season tournament
2025–26	9	14	Full season tournament features the national league champions and designated Cup winners (or runners-up in certain instances) of Malaysia, Singapore, Thailand, and Vietnam (two teams each), and Cambodia (one team). The national league champions of Brunei, Laos, Myanmar, and the Philippines will compete in Qualifying Round Play-Offs for two places in the Group Stage. The defending champions automatically qualify.

== Sponsorship ==
The ASEAN Club Championship has had title sponsors since its first two editions in 2003 and 2005. Following the competition's revival in 2024, title sponsorship was reintroduced. The competition has been known by various names incorporating those sponsors.

Period	Sponsor	Brand
2003–2005	LG Electronics	LG Cup
2024–present	Shopee	Shopee Cup

== Results ==
List of ASEAN Club Championship finals
Season	Winners	Score	Runners-up	Venue
Single match format
2003	(India) East Bengal	3–1	(Thailand) BEC Tero Sasana	Gelora Bung Karno Stadium, Jakarta, Indonesia
2005	(Singapore) Tampines Rovers	4–2	(Malaysia) Pahang FA	Hassanal Bolkiah National Stadium, Bandar Seri Begawan, Brunei
2022	Cancelled			
Two-legged format
2024–25	(Thailand) Buriram United	2–2	(Vietnam) Công An Hà Nội	Hàng Đẫy Stadium, Hanoi, Vietnam
2024–25	(Thailand) Buriram United	3–3 (3–2 p)	(Vietnam) Công An Hà Nội	Chang Arena, Buriram, Thailand
2025–26	(Thailand) Buriram United	1–0	(Malaysia) Selangor	Petaling Jaya Stadium, Selangor, Malaysia
2025–26	(Thailand) Buriram United	2–1	(Malaysia) Selangor	Chang Arena, Buriram, Thailand

== Records and statistics ==
=== Performance by club ===
Italics indicates defunct club.

Club	Winners	Runners-up	Seasons won	Seasons runner-up
(Thailand) Buriram United	2	0	2024–25, 2025–26	
(India) East Bengal	1	0	2003	
(Singapore) Tampines Rovers	1	0	2005	
(Thailand) BEC Tero Sasana	0	1		2003
(Malaysia) Pahang FA	0	1		2005
(Vietnam) Công An Hà Nội	0	1		2024–25
(Malaysia) Selangor	0	1		2025–26

Invited club

=== Performance by nation ===
Nation	Winners	Runners-up	Winning clubs	Runners-up
Thailand	2	1	Buriram United (2)	BEC Tero Sasana (1)
India	1	0	East Bengal (1)	—
Singapore	1	0	Tampines Rovers (1)	—
Malaysia	0	2	—	Pahang FA (1); Selangor (1)
Vietnam	0	1	—	Công An Hà Nội (1)

Invited nation

=== By semi-final appearances ===
Year in bold: team was finalist

Team	No.	Years
(Thailand) Buriram United	2	**2024–25**, **2025–26**
(India) East Bengal	1	**2003**
(Indonesia) Petrokimia Putra	1	2003
(Malaysia) Perak FA	1	2003
(Thailand) BEC Tero Sasana	1	**2003**
(Brunei) DPMM	1	2005
(Malaysia) Pahang FA	1	**2005**
(Singapore) Tampines Rovers	1	**2005**
(Vietnam) Hoang Anh Gia Lai	1	2005
(Indonesia) PSM Makassar	1	2024–25
(Thailand) BG Pathum United	1	2024–25
(Vietnam) Công An Hà Nội	1	**2024–25**
(Malaysia) Johor Darul Ta'zim	1	2025–26
(Malaysia) Selangor	1	**2025–26**
(Vietnam) Nam Định	1	2025–26

By nation

Nation	Semi-finals	Different clubs
Malaysia	4	4
Thailand	4	3
Vietnam	3	3
Indonesia	2	2
Brunei	1	1
India	1	1
Singapore	1	1

=== All-time points table ===
Following statistical convention in football, matches decided in extra time are counted as wins and losses, while matches decided by penalty shoot-outs are counted as draws. Teams are ranked by total points, then by goal difference, then by goals scored. Only the top twenty five are listed (excludes qualifying rounds).

As of end of 2025–26 season

Rank	Club	Seasons	Pld	W	D	L	GF	GA	GD	Pts	W	RU	SF
1	(Thailand) Buriram United	2	18	9	7	2	42	17	+25	34	2	0	0
2	(Vietnam) Công An Hà Nội	2	14	8	3	3	31	18	+10	27	0	1	0
3	(Thailand) BG Pathum United	2	12	5	5	2	21	16	+5	20	0	0	1
4	(Singapore) Tampines Rovers	2	10	6	1	3	20	21	–1	19	1	0	0
5	(Cambodia) Svay Rieng	2	10	4	3	3	17	12	+5	15	0	0	0
6	(Malaysia) Selangor	1	9	4	3	2	14	9	+5	15	0	1	0
7	(Malaysia) Johor Darul Ta'zim	1	7	4	2	1	16	8	+8	14	0	0	1
8	(Vietnam) Nam Định	1	7	4	1	2	14	7	+7	13	0	0	1
9	(Indonesia) PSM Makassar	1	7	4	1	2	9	6	+3	13	0	0	1
10	(Malaysia) Pahang	1	5	4	0	1	18	4	+14	12	0	1	0
11	(Thailand) BEC Tero Sasana	1	5	4	0	1	10	5	+5	12	0	1	0
12	(Vietnam) Hoàng Anh Gia Lai	2	7	3	1	3	23	11	+12	10	0	0	1
13	(India) East Bengal	1	5	3	1	1	12	4	+8	10	1	0	0
14	(Indonesia) Petrokimia Putra	1	4	3	1	0	9	3	+6	10	0	0	1
15	(Malaysia) Perak	1	5	3	0	2	8	6	+2	9	0	0	1
16	(Singapore) Lion City Sailors	2	10	2	2	6	8	22	–14	8	0	0	0
17	(Malaysia) Terengganu	1	5	2	1	2	13	9	+4	7	0	0	0
18	(Indonesia) Persita Tangerang	1	3	2	0	1	8	4	+4	6	0	0	0
19	(Vietnam) Đông Á Thanh Hóa	1	5	1	3	1	6	7	–1	6	0	0	0
20	(Indonesia) Borneo Samarinda	1	5	2	0	3	7	9	–2	6	0	0	0
21	(Malaysia) Kuala Lumpur City	1	5	2	0	3	4	6	–2	6	0	0	0
22	(Brunei) DPMM	2	6	1	2	3	6	10	–4	5	0	0	1
23	(Thailand) Bangkok United	2	6	1	2	2	6	12	–6	5	0	0	0
24	(Myanmar) Finance and Revenue	1	3	1	0	2	4	5	–1	3	0	0	0
25	(Philippines) Kaya–Iloilo	1	5	1	0	4	4	12	–8	3	0	0	0
26	(Timor-Leste) Zebra Baucau	1	3	1	0	2	4	22	–18	3	0	0	0
27	Singapore Armed Forces	1	3	0	1	2	4	7	–3	1	0	0	0
28	Thailand Tobacco Monopoly	1	3	0	1	2	4	7	–3	1	0	0	0
29	(Philippines) Dynamic Herb Cebu	1	5	0	1	4	2	13	–11	1	0	0	0
30	(Laos) MCTPC	1	2	0	0	2	2	5	–3	0	0	0	0
31	(Cambodia) Samart United	1	2	0	0	2	0	4	–4	0	0	0	0
32	(Philippines) Philippine Army	1	2	0	0	2	0	9	–9	0	0	0	0
33	(Cambodia) Nagacorp	1	2	0	0	2	1	11	–10	0	0	0	0
34	(Myanmar) Shan United	2	10	0	0	10	10	34	–24	0	0	0	0

Invited club

== Awards ==
=== Top scorers ===
Season	Player(s)	Club(s)	Goals
2003	(India) Baichung Bhutia	(India) East Bengal	9
2005	(Cameroon) Bernard Tchoutang	(Malaysia) Pahang FA	7
2005	(Vietnam) Nguyễn Đình Việt	(Vietnam) Hoang Anh Gia Lai	7
2024–25	(Brazil) Lucas Crispim	(Thailand) Buriram United	6
2024–25	(Brazil) Léo Artur	(Vietnam) Công An Hà Nội	6
2025–26	(Brazil) Bérgson	(Malaysia) Johor Darul Ta'zim	7
2025–26	(Vietnam) Nguyễn Xuân Son	(Vietnam) Nam Định	7

=== Best player ===
Season	Player	Club
2003	(Thailand) Therdsak Chaiman	(Thailand) BEC Tero Sasana
2005	Not awarded	
2024–25	(Brazil) Lucas Crispim	(Thailand) Buriram United
2025–26	(Brazil) Guilherme Bissoli	(Thailand) Buriram United

=== Best young player ===
Season	Player	Club
2003	Not awarded	
2005	Not awarded	
2024–25	(Singapore) Ilhan Fandi	(Thailand) BG Pathum United
2025–26	(Thailand) Nathakorn Ratthanasuwan	(Thailand) Buriram United

=== Best goalkeeper ===
Season	Player	Club
2003	(India) Sandip Nandy	(India) East Bengal
2005	Not awarded	
2024–25	(Thailand) Chatchai Budprom	(Thailand) Buriram United
2025–26	(Malaysia) Kalamullah Al-Hafiz	(Malaysia) Selangor

=== Team of the Tournament ===
Season	Goalkeeper	Defenders	Midfielders	Forwards
2024–25	(Thailand) Chatchai Budprom	(Australia) Curtis Good (Thailand) Kritsada Kaman (Vietnam) Trần Đình Trọng	(Thailand) Theerathon Bunmathan (Brazil) Lucas Crispim (Brazil) Léo Artur (Vietnam) Nguyễn Quang Hải	(Vietnam) Lê Văn Đô (Slovenia) Nermin Haljeta (Malaysia) Safawi Rasid
2025–26	(Philippines) Neil Etheridge	(Thailand) Theerathon Bunmathan (Thailand) Pansa Hemviboon (Malaysia) Quentin Cheng	(Spain) Óscar Arribas (Austria) Peter Žulj (Spain) Nacho Méndez (Jordan) Noor Al-Rawabdeh (Malaysia) Faisal Halim	(Brazil) Chrigor (Brazil) Bérgson

Bergson was a Brazilian citizenship before being naturalised to play for Malaysia in September 2026.

=== Total awards ===
Rank	Player	Wins
1	(Thailand) Theerathon Bunmathan	2

== See also ==
- Mekong Club Championship
- ASEAN Super League
- CAFA Silk Way Cup
- SAFF Club Championship
- Marianas Club Championship
- A3 Champions Cup
- Arab Club Champions Cup
- Gulf Club Champions League
