= 2026–27 Cong An Hanoi FC season =

20th season in existence of Cong An Hanoi FC

Cong An Hanoi
2026–27 season
- President: Nguyễn Tiến Đạt
- Head coach: Alexandré Pölking
- Stadium: Hàng Đẫy
- V.League 1: 4th
- Vietnamese Cup: Round of 16
- Vietnamese Super Cup: Winners
- ASEAN Club Championship: Group stage
- AFC Champions League Elite: League stage
- Top goalscorer: League: Alan Grafite (4); All: Alan Grafite; Brayan Perea (6 each)
- Highest home attendance: 12,000 v Hanoi FC (18 Oct 2026; V.League 1)
- Lowest home attendance: 5,168 v Kashima Antlers (13 Oct 2026; AFC Champions League Elite)
- Average home league attendance: 8,000
- Biggest win: 5–0 v Cong An Ho Chi Minh City (Home, 30 Aug 2026, Vietnamese Super Cup)
- Biggest defeat: 1–4 v Gamba Osaka (Away, 15 Sep 2026, AFC Champions League Elite)
Home colours	Away colours	Third colours
- All statistics correct as of 19 November 2026.

The 2026–27 season is the 20th season in the history of Cong An Hanoi since their re-establishment in 2008, and the club's fifth consecutive season in the top flight of Vietnamese football. In addition to the domestic league, the club is participating in this season's editions of the Vietnamese Cup, Vietnamese Super Cup, AFC Champions League Elite and ASEAN Club Championship.

== Players ==
As of 29 August 2026

Note: Flags indicate national team as defined under FIFA eligibility rules; some limited exceptions apply. Players may hold more than one non-FIFA nationality.

No.	Pos.	Nation	Player
1	GK	VIE	Nguyễn Filip
2	DF	VIE	Vũ Đức Huy
4	DF	VIE	Phan Ngọc Tín
5	DF	VIE	Đoàn Văn Hậu
6	MF	AUS	Stefan Mauk
7	DF	VIE	Cao Pendant Quang Vinh
8	FW	TOG	David Henen
9	FW	VIE	Nguyễn Đình Bắc
10	MF	BRA	Léo Artur
11	MF	VIE	Lê Phạm Thành Long
12	MF	VIE	Hoàng Văn Toản
14	MF	ESP	Damià Sabater
15	MF	VIE	Bùi Xuân Thịnh
17	DF	VIE	Vũ Văn Thanh

No.	Pos.	Nation	Player
18	FW	VIE	Đinh Thanh Bình
19	MF	VIE	Nguyễn Quang Hải (captain)
21	DF	VIE	Trần Đình Trọng
23	GK	VIE	Vũ Thành Vinh
26	DF	VIE	Hà Văn Phương
30	GK	VIE	Y Êli Niê
38	DF	VIE	Nguyễn Adou Leygley Minh
55	DF	IRQ	Frans Putros
68	DF	VIE	Bùi Hoàng Việt Anh (vice-captain)
72	FW	BRA	Alan Grafite
88	MF	VIE	Lê Văn Đô
90	FW	COL	Brayan Perea
93	DF	FRA	Kevin Pham Ba

== Transfers ==
=== In ===
Date	Pos.	Player	From	Fee	Ref.
22 May 2026	MF	(Australia) Stefan Mauk	(Australia) Adelaide United	Undisclosed	
1 July 2026	DF	(Vietnam) Trương Văn Thiết	(Vietnam) Bắc Ninh	End of loan	
1 July 2026	DF	(Vietnam) Phạm Lý Đức	(Vietnam) PVF-CAND	End of loan	
1 July 2026	DF	(France) Kevin Pham Ba	(Vietnam) Thép Xanh Nam Định	End of loan	
1 July 2026	MF	(Vietnam) Phạm Văn Luân	(Vietnam) Công An Hồ Chí Minh City	End of loan	
5 July 2026	MF	(Spain) Damià Sabater	(Romania) Metaloglobus București	Free	
9 July 2026	GK	(Vietnam) Y Êli Niê	(Vietnam) Đông Á Thanh Hóa	Free	
12 July 2026	FW	(Togo) David Henen	(Vietnam) SHB Đà Nẵng	Free	
19 July 2026	FW	(Vietnam) Đinh Thanh Bình	(Vietnam) Ninh Bình	Undisclosed	
21 July 2026	DF	(Vietnam) Phan Ngọc Tín	(Vietnam) Quy Nhơn United	Undisclosed	
21 July 2026	FW	(Colombia) Brayan Perea	(Thailand) Port	Free	
24 July 2026	DF	(Iraq) Frans Putros	(Indonesia) Persib Bandung	Free	

=== Out ===
Date	Pos.	Player	To	Fee	Ref.
13 June 2026	DF	(Brazil) Hugo Gomes	(Singapore) Lion City Sailors	Free	
1 July	MF	(Brazil) Vitão	(Vietnam) Bắc Ninh	Free	
7 July 2026	MF	(Brazil) Rogério Alves		Free	
10 July 2026	GK	(Vietnam) Vũ Tuyên Quang	(Vietnam)	Free	
1 August 2026	DF	(Vietnam) Nguyễn Văn Đức	(Vietnam) Trương Tươi Đồng Nai	Free	

== Pre-season and friendlies ==
Win Draw Loss Fixtures

4 August 2026 Friendly	Cong An Hanoi	0–2	Thep Xanh Nam Dinh	Hưng Yên
--:-- UTC+7		Report	Ezequiel; Lý Công Hoàng Anh	Stadium: PVF Stadium

5 August 2026 Friendly	Cong An Hanoi	2–4	Truong Tuoi Dong Nai	Hưng Yên
--:-- UTC+7	Goal	Report	Majdevac; Lê Thanh Bình; Hồ Tuấn Tài	Stadium: PVF Stadium

22 August 2026 Friendly	Cong An Hanoi	4–1	Hung Yen	Hanoi
17:00 UTC+7	Artur; Sabater; Perea; Đinh Thanh Bình	Report (HYFC); Report (CAHN)	Goal	Stadium: Hàng Đẫy Stadium

== Competitions ==
=== Overall record ===
Competition	First match	Last match	Starting round	Final position	Record							
Competition	First match	Last match	Starting round	Final position	Pld	W	D	L	GF	GA	GD	Win %
V.League 1	5 September 2026	22 May 2027	Round 1		7	4	2	1	11	5	+6	57.14
Vietnamese Cup	19 January 2027		Round of 16		0	0	0	0	0	0	+0	—
Vietnamese Super Cup	30 August 2026		Final	Winners	1	1	0	0	5	0	+5	100.00
AFC Champions League Elite	11 August 2026		Preliminary round		5	2	1	2	6	7	−1	40.00
ASEAN Club Championship	8 October 2026		Group stage		2	1	0	1	2	3	−1	50.00
Total					15	8	3	4	24	15	+9	53.33

Last updated: 19 November 2026
Source: Soccerway

=== Vietnamese Super Cup ===
Công An Hà Nội, as the 2025–26 V.League 1 champions, played the winners of the 2025–26 Vietnamese Cup, Cong An Ho Chi Minh City. The fixture took place at Hàng Đẫy Stadium in Hanoi on 30 August 2026.

Times are local (UTC+7)

30 August 2026 Final	Cong An Hanoi	5–0	Cong An Ho Chi Minh City	Hanoi
18:00	Alan 8', 27'; Cao Pendant Quang Vinh (yellow card) 35'; Perea 45+3'; Artur (yellow card) 63'; Nguyễn Đình Bắc 69'; Putros 71'	Report	Williams Minh Hoàng (yellow card) 11'; Đào Quốc Gia (yellow card) 88'	Stadium: Hàng Đẫy Stadium; Attendance: 15,120; Referee: Mai Xuân Hùng

=== V.League 1 ===
==== League table ====
Pos	Team	Pld	W	D	L	GF	GA	GD	Pts	Qualification or relegation
2	Ninh Binh	8	5	1	2	15	10	+5	16	Qualification for the AFC Champions League Two qualifying play-offs
3	Song Lam Nghe An	8	3	5	0	13	7	+6	14	
4	Cong An Hanoi	7	4	2	1	11	5	+6	14	
5	Hong Linh Ha Tinh	8	4	2	2	12	10	+2	14	
6	Thanh Hoa	8	3	3	2	11	11	0	12	

Updated to match(es) played on 21 November 2026. Source: VPF
Rules for classification: 1) Points; 2) Head-to-head points; 3) Head-to-head goal difference; 4) Head-to-head goals scored; 5) Goal difference; 6) Goals scored; 7) Away goals scored; 8) Disciplinary points.

==== Results summary ====
Overall								Home						Away					
Pld	W	D	L	GF	GA	GD	Pts	W	D	L	GF	GA	GD	W	D	L	GF	GA	GD
7	4	2	1	11	5	+6	14	2	1	1	6	4	+2	2	1	0	5	1	+4

Last updated: 7 November 2026.
Source: VPF

==== Results by round ====
Round	1	2	3	4	5	6	7	9	10	11	12	13	8	14	15	16	17	18	19	20	21	22	23	24	25	26
Ground	H	A	A	H	H	A	H	A	A	H	H	A	H	A	H	A	H	H	A	A	H	A	H	A	H	A
Result	W	W	W	L	D	D	W																			
Position	6	3	1	2	3	3	2																			

Updated to match(es) played on 7 November 2026. Source: VPF
A = Away; H = Home; W = Win; D = Draw; L = Loss

==== Matches ====
The league fixtures were drawn and released on 6 August 2026.

Win Draw Loss Fixtures

5 September 2026 1	Cong An Hanoi	2–0	Hong Linh Ha Tinh	Hanoi
19:15	Artur 5'; Alan 83'; Lê Phạm Thành Long (yellow card) 85'	Report	Daniel (yellow card) 90+5'	Stadium: Hàng Đẫy Stadium; Attendance: 9,000; Referee: Nguyễn Mạnh Hải

10 September 2026 2	The Cong–Viettel	0–1	Cong An Hanoi	Hanoi
19:15	Triệu Việt Hưng (yellow card) 71'; Nguyễn Đức Hoàng Minh (yellow card) 86'	Report	Nguyễn Đình Bắc (yellow card) 30'; Kevin Pham Ba (yellow card) 45+1'; Đoàn Văn Hậu (red card) 70'; Mauk 90+4', (yellow card) 90+4'	Stadium: Hàng Đẫy Stadium; Attendance: 8,000; Referee: Ngô Duy Lân

20 September 2026 3	Dong Nai City	0–3	Cong An Hanoi	Đồng Nai
18:00	Lê Văn Sơn (red card) 18'; Huỳnh Tấn Sinh (yellow card) 78'	Report	Nguyễn Đình Bắc (yellow card) 16'; Alan 52'; Brayan Perea 55'; Lê Phạm Thành Long 58'	Stadium: Bình Phước Stadium; Attendance: 10,000; Referee: Lê Vũ Linh

18 October 2026 4	Cong An Hanoi	1–2	Hanoi FC	Hanoi
19:15	Artur 46'	Report	Phạm Xuân Mạnh 19', (yellow card) 39'; Nguyễn Công Nhật (yellow card) 38'; Nguyễn Văn Tùng 49'; Sade (yellow card) 63'; Hồ Thanh Minh (yellow card) 76'	Stadium: Hàng Đẫy Stadium; Attendance: 12,000; Referee: Ngô Duy Lân

22 October 2026 5	Cong An Hanoi	1–1	Thanh Hoa	Hanoi
19:15	Nguyễn Đình Bắc 43'	Report	Nguyễn Văn Tùng 60'	Stadium: Hàng Đẫy Stadium; Attendance: 6,000; Referee: Đỗ Khánh Nam

31 October 2026 6	Song Lam Nghe An	1–1	Cong An Hanoi	Nghệ An
18:00	Lê Văn Quý (yellow card) 18' (yellow-red card) 77'; Luizão 41'; Phan Xuân Đại (yellow card) 54'	Report	Artur 70'; Hà Văn Phương (yellow card) 72'; Nguyễn Adou Leygley Minh (red card) 87'	Stadium: Vinh Stadium; Attendance: 14,000; Referee: Mai Xuân Hùng

7 November 2026 7	Cong An Hanoi	2–1	Cong An Ho Chi Minh City	Hanoi
19:15	Lê Văn Đô (yellow card) 12'; Alan 58', 81'; Nguyễn Filip (yellow card) 70'; Cao Pendant Quang Vinh (yellow card) 90+5'	Report	Olaha (yellow card) 27'; Williams Minh Hoàng 71' (pen.); Nguyễn Phi Hoàng (yellow card) 75'	Stadium: Hàng Đẫy Stadium; Attendance: 9,000; Referee: Nguyễn Mạnh Hải

27 November 2026 9	Thep Xanh Nam Dinh	v	Cong An Hanoi	Ninh Bình
18:00		Report		Stadium: Thiên Trường Stadium

6 December 2026 10	Ninh Binh	v	Cong An Hanoi	Hanoi
18:00		Report		Stadium: Hàng Đẫy Stadium

13 December 2026 11	Cong An Hanoi	v	Hoang Anh Gia Lai	Hanoi
19:15		Report		Stadium: Hàng Đẫy Stadium

17 December 2026 12	Cong An Hanoi	v	Haiphong	Hanoi
18:00		Report		Stadium: Hàng Đẫy Stadium

21 December 2026 13	SHB Da Nang	v	Cong An Hanoi	Đà Nẵng
18:00		Report		Stadium: Chi Lăng Stadium

25 December 2026 8	Cong An Hanoi	v	Bac Ninh	Hanoi
19:15		Report		Stadium: Hàng Đẫy Stadium

February 2027 14	Hanoi FC	v	Cong An Hanoi	Hanoi
19:15		Report		Stadium: Hàng Đẫy Stadium

March 2027 15	Cong An Hanoi	v	Dong Nai	Hanoi
19:15		Report		Stadium: Hàng Đẫy Stadium

March 2027 16	Haiphong	v	Cong An Hanoi	Haiphong
18:00		Report		Stadium: Lạch Tray Stadium

March 2027 17	Cong An Hanoi	v	SHB Da Nang	Hanoi
19:15		Report		Stadium: Hàng Đẫy Stadium

March 2027 18	Cong An Hanoi	v	Thep Xanh Nam Dinh	Hanoi
19:15		Report		Stadium: Hàng Đẫy Stadium

April 2027 19	Bac Ninh	v	Cong An Hanoi	Bắc Ninh
18:00		Report		Stadium: Việt Yên Stadium

April 2027 20	Cong An Ho Chi Minh City	v	Cong An Hanoi	Ho Chi Minh City
18:00		Report		Stadium: Thống Nhất Stadium

April 2027 21	Cong An Hanoi	v	Song Lam Nghe An	Hanoi
18:00		Report		Stadium: Hàng Đẫy Stadium

April 2027 22	Thanh Hoa	v	Cong An Hanoi	Thanh Hóa
17:00		Report		Stadium: Thanh Hóa Stadium

May 2027 23	Cong An Hanoi	v	Ninh Binh	Hanoi
19:15		Report		Stadium: Hàng Đẫy Stadium

May 2027 24	Hoang Anh Gia Lai	v	Cong An Hanoi FC	Gia Lai
17:00		Report		Stadium: Pleiku Stadium

May 2027 25	Cong An Hanoi FC	v	The Cong–Viettel	Hanoi
19:15		Report		Stadium: Hàng Đẫy Stadium

22 May 2027 26	Hong Linh Ha Tinh	v	Cong An Hanoi FC	Hà Tĩnh
18:00		Report		Stadium: Hà Tĩnh Stadium

=== Vietnamese Cup ===
The both qualifying round and round of 16 draw were held on 6 August 2026.

19 January 2027 Round of 16	Cong An Hanoi	v	Dong Nai City	Hanoi
19:15		Report		Stadium: Hàng Đẫy Stadium

=== AFC Champions League Elite ===
As the champions of the V.League 1, Công An Hà Nội entered the AFC Champions League Elite in the preliminary round.

==== Preliminary round ====
Win Draw Loss Fixtures

11 August 2026 Preliminary round	Adelaide United (Australia)	0–2	(Vietnam) Công An Hà Nội	Adelaide, Australia
19:00 UTC+9:30	Kikianis (yellow card) 22'; Crawford (yellow card) 31'	Report	Adou (yellow card) 8'; Henen 41'; Perea 64'; Đinh Thanh Bình (yellow card) 90+3'; Nguyễn Filip (yellow card) 90+4'	Stadium: Hindmarsh Stadium; Attendance: 6,451; Referee: Asker Nadjafaliev (Uzbekistan)

==== League phase ====
The league stage draw was held on 18 August 2026 at 16:00 MST in Kuala Lumpur, Malaysia.

===== League stage table =====
Pos	Team	Pld	W	D	L	GF	GA	GD	Pts
9	(China) Beijing Guoan	4	2	1	1	10	10	0	7
10	(South Korea) Daejeon Hana Citizen	4	1	1	2	2	4	−2	4
11	(Vietnam) Công An Hà Nội	4	1	1	2	4	7	−3	4
12	(Thailand) Buriram United	4	0	3	1	2	3	−1	3
13	(Thailand) Port	4	1	0	3	9	14	−5	3

Updated to match(es) played on 4 November 2026. Source: AFC
Rules for classification: 1) points; 2) goal difference; 3) number of goals scored; 4) number of matches won; 5) penalty shoot-out if only two teams remain tied and played each other on the final matchday 6) fair play ranking; 7) drawing of lots

===== Results summary =====
Overall								Home						Away					
Pld	W	D	L	GF	GA	GD	Pts	W	D	L	GF	GA	GD	W	D	L	GF	GA	GD
4	1	1	2	4	7	−3	4	0	1	1	0	1	−1	1	0	1	4	6	−2

Last updated: 3 November 2026.
Source: AFC

===== Results by round =====
Round	1	2	3	4	5	6	7	8
Ground	A	H	A	H	H	A	H	A
Result	L	L	W	D				
Position	15	13	11	11				
Points	0	0	3	4				

Updated to match(es) played on 3 November 2026. Source: AFC
A = Away; H = Home; W = Win; D = Draw; L = Loss; P = Postponed

===== Matches =====
Win Draw Loss Fixtures

15 September 2026 1	Gamba Osaka (Japan Football Association)	4–1	(Vietnam Football Federation) Công An Hà Nội	Osaka, Japan
19:00 UTC+9 (17:00 UTC+7)	Usami 29', 67'; Toshida 58'; Sumi 90+3'; Fukuoka (yellow card) 90+4'	Report	Mauk (yellow card) 22'; Perea 79'	Stadium: Suita City Football Stadium; Attendance: 8,800; Referee: Asker Nadjafaliev (Uzbekistan)

13 October 2026 2	Công An Hà Nội (Vietnam Football Federation)	0–1	(Japan Football Association) Kashima Antlers	Hanoi, Vietnam
19:15 UTC+7	Mauk (yellow card) 24'; Nguyễn Quang Hải (yellow card) 55'; Đoàn Văn Hậu (yellow card) 63'	Report	Bueno (yellow card) 24'; Nguyễn Adou Leygley Minh 61' (o.g.)	Stadium: Hàng Đẫy Stadium; Attendance: 5,168; Referee: Mooud Bonyadifard (Iran)

27 October 2026 3	Shanghai Port (Chinese Football Association)	2–3	(Vietnam Football Federation) Công An Hà Nội	Shanghai, China
18:00 UTC+8 (17:00 UTC+7)	Ampem 44'; Campos 60'	Report	Perea 35', 69'; Putros (yellow card) 37'; Mauk (yellow card) 47'; Artur 49'; Lê Văn Đô (yellow card) 57'	Stadium: Pudong Football Stadium; Attendance: 10,399; Referee: Choi Hyun-jai (South Korea)

3 November 2026 4	Công An Hà Nội (Vietnam Football Federation)	0–0	(Japan Football Association) Kyoto Sanga	Hanoi, Vietnam
19:15 UTC+7	Alan (yellow card) 41'; Bùi Hoàng Việt Anh (yellow card) 45+1'; Sabater (yellow card) 45+1'; Perea (yellow card) 90+5'	Report	Morooka (yellow card) 10'; Tawiah (yellow card) 53'; Pedro (yellow card) 90+6'	Stadium: Hàng Đẫy Stadium; Attendance: 6,129; Referee: Ammar Mahfoodh (Bahrain)

24 November 2026 5	Công An Hà Nội (Vietnam Football Federation)	v	(Japan Football Association) Vissel Kobe	Hanoi, Vietnam
19:15 UTC+7		Report		Stadium: Hàng Đẫy Stadium

1 December 2026 6	Kashiwa Reysol (Japan Football Association)	v	(Vietnam Football Federation) Công An Hà Nội	Chiba, Japan
19:00 UTC+9 (17:00 UTC+7)		Report		Stadium: Kashiwa Soccer Stadium

9 February 2027 7	Công An Hà Nội (Vietnam Football Federation)	v	(Chinese Football Association) Beijing Guoan	Hanoi, Vietnam
19:15 UTC+7		Report		Stadium: Hàng Đẫy Stadium

16 February 2027 8	Johor Darul Ta'zim (Football Association of Malaysia)	v	(Vietnam Football Federation) Công An Hà Nội	Johor, Malaysia
18:00 UTC+8 (17:00 UTC+7)		Report		Stadium: Sultan Ibrahim Stadium

=== ASEAN Club Championship ===
==== Group A table ====
The group stage draw was held on 5 June 2026.

As the champions of the V.League 1, Công An Hà Nội entered the ASEAN Club Championship in the group stage.

Pos	Team	Pld	W	D	L	GF	GA	GD	Pts	Qualification	JDT	SIB	CAH	PKR	LCS	POR	SUN
1	(Malaysia) Johor Darul Ta'zim	2	2	0	0	9	1	+8	6	Advance to knockout stage	—	—	—	6–0	1 Apr	—	10 Dec
2	(Indonesia) Persib	2	2	0	0	9	1	+8	6	Advance to knockout stage	17 Dec	—	4 Mar	—	—	—	6–0
3	(Vietnam) Công An Hà Nội	2	1	0	1	2	3	−1	3	Advance to knockout stage	1–3	—	—	10 Dec	—	—	25 Feb
4	(Cambodia) PKR Svay Rieng	2	1	0	1	4	7	−3	3	Advance to knockout stage	—	25 Feb	—	—	17 Dec	4–1	—
5	(Singapore) Lion City Sailors	1	0	0	1	0	1	−1	0		—	10 Dec	0–1	—	—	25 Feb	—
6	(Thailand) Port	2	0	0	2	2	7	−5	0		4 Mar	1–3	1 Apr	—	—	—	—
7	(Myanmar) Shan United	1	0	0	1	0	6	−6	0		—	—	—	1 Apr	4 Mar	17 Dec	—

Updated to match(es) played on 19 November 2026. Source: ASEAN United
Rules for classification: Tiebreakers

===== Results by round =====
Round	1	2	3	4	5	6
Ground	A	H	H	H	A	A
Result	W	L				
Position	3	3				
Points	3	3				

Updated to match(es) played on 19 November 2026. Source: ASEAN United FC
A = Away; H = Home; W = Win; D = Draw; L = Loss; P = Postponed

===== Matches =====
Win Draw Loss Fixtures

8 October 2026 1	Lion City Sailors (Singapore)	0–1	(Vietnam) Công An Hà Nội	Kallang, Singapore
19:30 UTC+8 (18:30 UTC+7)	Wright (yellow card) 35'	Report	Sabater (yellow card) 27'; Léo Artur 45+2'; Brayan Perea (yellow card) 81'	Stadium: Jalan Besar Stadium; Attendance: 1,897; Referee: Hiroki Kasahara (Japan)

19 November 2026 2	Công An Hà Nội (Vietnam)	1–3	(Malaysia) Johor Darul Ta'zim	Hanoi, Vietnam
19:30 UTC+7	Nené 3' (o.g.)	Report	Arribas 50', 85'; Lowry (yellow card) 57'; Guilherme 60'; Tapp (yellow card) 65'	Stadium: Hàng Đẫy Stadium; Referee: Rustam Lutfullin (Uzbekistan)

10 December 2026 3	Công An Hà Nội (Vietnam)	v	(Cambodia) PKR Svay Rieng	Hanoi, Vietnam
19:30 UTC+7		Report		Stadium: Hàng Đẫy Stadium

25 February 2027 4	Công An Hà Nội (Vietnam)	v	(Myanmar) Shan United	Hanoi, Vietnam
19:30 UTC+7		Report		Stadium: Hàng Đẫy Stadium

4 March 2027 5	Persib (Indonesia)	v	(Vietnam) Công An Hà Nội	Bandung, Indonesia
19:00 UTC+7		Report		Stadium: Gelora Bandung Lautan Api Stadium

1 April 2027 6	Port (Thailand)	v	(Vietnam) Công An Hà Nội	Bangkok, Thailand
19:30 UTC+7		Report		Stadium: PAT Stadium

== Statistics ==
=== Appearances and goals ===
As of 19 November 2026

Players with no appearances are not included on the list, italics indicate a loaned in player.

No.	Pos	Nat	Player	Total		V.League 1		Vietnamese Cup		Vietnamese Super Cup		AFC Champions League Elite		ASEAN Club Championship	
No.	Pos	Nat	Player	Apps	Goals	Apps	Goals	Apps	Goals	Apps	Goals	Apps	Goals	Apps	Goals
1	GK	(Vietnam) VIE	Nguyễn Filip	15	0	7+0	0	0+0	0	1+0	0	5+0	0	2+0	0
4	FW	(Vietnam) VIE	Phạm Ngọc Tín	9	0	2+3	0	0+0	0	0+0	0	0+2	0	0+2	0
5	FW	(Vietnam) VIE	Đoàn Văn Hậu	10	0	3+0	0	0+0	0	0+1	0	4+0	0	2+0	0
6	MF	(Australia) AUS	Stefan Mauk	11	1	4+0	1	0+0	0	1+0	0	4+0	0	2+0	0
7	DF	(Vietnam) VIE	Cao Pendant Quang Vinh	15	0	5+2	0	0+0	0	1+0	0	5+0	0	1+1	0
8	FW	(Togo) TOG	David Henen	3	1	1+0	0	0+0	0	0+0	0	2+0	1	0+0	0
9	FW	(Vietnam) VIE	Nguyễn Đình Bắc	12	2	6+1	1	0+0	0	0+1	1	1+2	0	0+1	0
10	MF	(Brazil) BRA	Léo Artur	11	5	5+1	3	0+0	0	1+0	0	3+0	1	1+0	1
11	MF	(Vietnam) VIE	Lê Phạm Thành Long	13	1	5+2	1	0+0	0	1+0	0	1+2	0	1+1	0
12	MF	(Vietnam) VIE	Hoàng Văn Toản	13	0	3+4	0	0+0	0	0+1	0	0+4	0	1+0	0
14	MF	(Spain) ESP	Damià Sabater	9	0	2+0	0	0+0	0	0+0	0	4+1	0	2+0	0
15	MF	(Vietnam) VIE	Bùi Xuân Thịnh	5	0	1+3	0	0+0	0	0+0	0	0+1	0	0+0	0
18	FW	(Vietnam) VIE	Đinh Thanh Bình	7	0	1+3	0	0+0	0	0+0	0	0+2	0	0+1	0
19	FW	(Vietnam) VIE	Nguyễn Quang Hải	11	0	5+1	0	0+0	0	0+1	0	2+0	0	0+2	0
21	DF	(Vietnam) VIE	Trần Đình Trọng	1	0	0+0	0	0+0	0	0+0	0	1+0	0	0+0	0
22	MF	(Vietnam) VIE	Phạm Minh Phúc	1	0	0+0	0	0+0	0	0+0	0	0+1	0	0+0	0
26	DF	(Vietnam) VIE	Hà Văn Phương	5	0	1+3	0	0+0	0	0+0	0	0+0	0	1+0	0
38	DF	(Vietnam) VIE	Nguyễn Adou Leygley Minh	13	0	5+0	0	0+0	0	1+0	0	4+1	0	2+0	0
55	DF	(Iraq) IRQ	Frans Putros	11	1	3+2	0	0+0	0	0+1	1	4+0	0	1+0	0
68	DF	(Vietnam) VIE	Bùi Hoàng Việt Anh	11	0	7+0	0	0+0	0	1+0	0	3+0	0	0+0	0
72	FW	(Brazil) BRA	Alan Grafite	13	6	3+2	4	0+0	0	1+0	2	4+1	0	2+0	0
88	MF	(Vietnam) VIE	Lê Văn Đô	13	0	4+3	0	0+0	0	1+0	0	2+1	0	2+0	0
90	FW	(Colombia) COL	Brayan Perea	13	6	4+1	1	0+0	0	1+0	1	5+0	4	2+0	0
93	DF	(France) FRA	Kevin Pham Ba	3	0	1+0	0	0+0	0	1+0	0	1+0	0	0+0	0

=== Goalscorers ===
The list is sorted by squad number when total goals are equal.

Rank	No.	Pos.	Nat.	Player	V.League 1	Vietnamese Cup	Vietnamese Super Cup	AFC Champions League Elite	ASEAN Club Championship	Total
1	72	FW	(Brazil)	Alan Grafite	4	0	2	0	0	6
1	90	FW	(Colombia)	Brayan Perea	1	0	1	4	0	6
2	10	MF	(Brazil)	Léo Artur	3	0	0	1	1	5
3	9	FW	(Vietnam)	Nguyễn Đình Bắc	1	0	1	0	0	2
4	6	MF	(Australia)	Stefan Mauk	1	0	0	0	0	1
4	8	FW	(Togo)	David Henen	0	0	0	1	0	1
4	11	MF	(Vietnam)	Lê Phạm Thành Long	1	0	0	0	0	1
4	55	DF	(Iraq)	Frans Putros	0	0	1	0	0	1
Own goals					0	0	0	0	1	1
Totals					11	0	5	6	2	24

Last updated: 19 November 2026.
Source: Competitions
