= 2026–27 V.League 1 =

71st season of the highest division of association football in Vietnam

V.League 1
- Season: 2026–27
- Dates: 4 September 2026 – 8 May 2027
- Matches: 55
- Goals: 146 (2.65 per match)
- Top goalscorer: Milan Makaric (8 goals)
- Biggest home win: Thep Xanh Nam Dinh 4–0 Hoang Anh Gia Lai (6 September 2026)
- Biggest away win: SHB Da Nang 1–5 Haiphong (17 October 2026)
- Highest scoring: Ninh Binh 4–3 Hoang Anh Gia Lai (18 October 2026)
- Longest winning run: Thep Xanh Nam Dinh (5 games)
- Longest unbeaten run: Song Lam Nghe An (8 games)
- Longest winless run: The Cong-Viettel (7 games)
- Longest losing run: Dong Nai City (3 games)
- Highest attendance: 14,000; Song Lam Nghe An 1–1 Cong An Hanoi (31 October 2026)
- Lowest attendance: 2,000; Hong Linh Ha Tinh 1–0 Dong Nai City (13 September 2026); Hoang Anh Gia Lai 3–0 SHB Da Nang (10 October 2026)
- Attendance: 354,800 (6,451 per match)
- All statistics correct as of 22 November 2026.

The 2026–27 V.League 1 (Vietnamese: Giải bóng đá Vô địch Quốc gia 2026/27, lit. 'National Football Championship 2026/27'), also known as the 2026–27 LPBank V.League 1 for sponsorship purposes (Vietnamese: Giải bóng đá Vô địch Quốc gia LPBank 2026/27, lit. 'LPBank National Football Championship 2026/27') is the 44th season of the V.League 1, the highest division of Vietnamese football and the 27th as a professional league and top-flight Vietnamese football overall. The season began on 4 September 2026, and is scheduled to conclude on 8 May 2027.

The fixtures were drawn and released on 6 August 2026 at 14:30 ICT.

Cong An Hanoi are the defending champions after securing their 2nd domestic championship (3rd overall) in the previous season.

== Teams ==
A total of 14 teams is participating in the 2026–27 edition of the V.League 1: twelve from previous season and two from V.League 2

=== Format changes ===
==== Relegation slots ====
Starting from this season, there were 2 direct relegation spots while the relegation play-off game has been removed, unlike the 2025–26 season which changed back to the initial 1,5 relegation spots.

==== New rules ====
The 2026–27 season introduced several rule changes from the 2026 FIFA World Cup and updates from the Laws of the Game from the International Football Association Board:

- 10-second substitutions: Players being substituted had ten seconds to exit the field; otherwise, the substitute had to wait for one minute before entering the match.
- 5-second restarts: A visual 5-second countdown was shown by the referee for throw-ins and goal kicks in situations of time-wasting. If the ball was not put into play in time, a restart was awarded to the opposing team; a corner kick was awarded if the infraction occurred with a goal kick.
- Penalty shoot-out and the outcome of the match: Removal of the automatic caution (YC) for the kicker if they and the goalkeeper offend at the same time.
- Expanded video assistant referee (VAR): The VAR could review and overturn wrongly awarded corner kicks, certain attacking fouls, and clear mistakes on red cards given from a second yellow card.
- Player leaving the field in protest: Players or officials who left the field in protest were sent off.

=== Changes from previous season ===
Promoted from 2025–26 V.League 2	Relegated to 2026–27 V.League 2
Truong Tuoi Dong Nai; Bac Ninh	Becamex Ho Chi Minh City; PVF-CAND

Becamex Ho Chi Minh City and PVF-CAND were relegated from the top tier after twenty-two and one season, respectively.

Truong Tuoi Dong Nai and Bac Ninh were promoted from second tier. Both teams will play in top tier for the first time ever.

Locations of the 2026–27 V.League 1 teams
Hanoi V.League 1 football clubs

=== Name changes ===
- On 24 August 2026, Dong A Thanh Hoa changed their name to Thanh Hoa.
- On 3 September 2026, Truong Tuoi Dong Nai changed their name to Dong Nai City.

=== Stadiums and locations ===
Team	Location	Stadium	Capacity	Previous season rank
Bac Ninh FC	Bac Ninh	Việt Yên	12,500	▲VL2 (2nd)
Cong An Hanoi	Hanoi	Hang Day	22,500	VL1 (1st)
Hanoi FC	Hanoi	Hang Day	22,500	VL1 (4th)
The Cong-Viettel	Hanoi	My Dinh	40,200	VL1 (2nd)
Cong An Ho Chi Minh City	Ho Chi Minh City	Thong Nhat; Binh Duong (Note: On the first half of the season, Cong An Ho Chi Minh City's home stadium Thong Nhat closed for renovation works for 2026 Vietnam National Games. As the result, the club would share the Bình Dương with Becamex Ho Chi Minh City.)	14,400; 18,250	VL1 (5th)
Dong Nai City	Dong Nai	Bình Phước	11,000	▲VL2 (1st)
Haiphong FC	Haiphong	Lach Tray	30,000	VL1 (7th)
Hong Linh Ha Tinh	Ha Tinh	Ha Tinh	20,000	VL1 (8th)
Hoang Anh Gia Lai	Gia Lai	Pleiku; Quy Nhơn	12,000; 15,000	VL1 (10th)
Ninh Binh FC	Ninh Binh	Ninh Binh	25,000	VL1 (3rd)
Thep Xanh Nam Dinh	Ninh Binh	Thiên Trường	30,000	VL1 (6th)
SHB Da Nang	Da Nang	Chi Lang	20,500	VL1 (12nd)
Song Lam Nghe An	Nghe An	Vinh	18,000	VL1 (9th)
Thanh Hoa FC	Thanh Hoa	Thanh Hoa	12,000	VL1 (11th)

=== Number of teams by region ===
Number	Region	Team(s)
7	Red River Delta	Bac Ninh, Cong An Hanoi, Haiphong, Ninh Binh, Hanoi FC, The Cong-Viettel, and Thep Xanh Nam Dinh
3	North Central	Hong Linh Ha Tinh, Song Lam Nghe An, and Thanh Hoa
2	Southeast	Cong An Ho Chi Minh City and Dong Nai City
1	Central Highlands	Hoang Anh Gia Lai
1	South Central	SHB Da Nang

== Personnel and kits ==
All teams were obligated to have the logo of the league sponsor LPBank on their left sleeve.

Note: Flags indicate national team as has been defined under FIFA eligibility rules. Players may hold more than one non-FIFA nationality.

Team	Manager	Captain	Kit manufacturer	Kit sponsor(s)					
Team	Manager	Captain	Kit manufacturer	Bac Ninh	(Brazil) Paulo Foiani	(Vietnam) Nguyễn Hải Huy	(Vietnam) Kamito	Hội Doanh Nhân Trẻ Thành Phố Bắc Ninh	List: Front: None; Back: None; Sleeves: None; Shorts: None
Cong An Hanoi	(Brazil) Alexandré Pölking	(Vietnam) Nguyễn Quang Hải	(Japan) Mizuno	Công An Hà Nội	List: Front: None; Back: None; Sleeves: None; Shorts: None				
Cong An Ho Chi Minh City	(Australia) Arthur Diles	(Vietnam) Nguyễn Tiến Linh	(Japan) Jogarbola	Công An TP. Hồ Chí Minh	List: Front: Vingroup, VPBank; Back: Sacombank; Sleeves: None; Shorts: None				
Dong Nai City	(Vietnam) Nguyễn Việt Thắng	(Vietnam) Bùi Tấn Trường	(Japan) Jogarbola	Trường Tươi Group	List: Front: None; Back: None; Sleeves: None; Shorts: None				
Haiphong	(South Korea) Lee Gi-nam	(Vietnam) Lê Mạnh Dũng	(Japan) Jogarbola	None	List: Front: None; Back: None; Sleeves: None; Shorts: None				
Hanoi FC	(Australia) Harry Kewell	(Vietnam) Nguyễn Văn Quyết	(Germany) Adidas	T&T Homes	List: Front: None; Back: SHS, Vinawind, Quảng Ninh Port; Sleeves: None; Shorts: None				
Hoang Anh Gia Lai	(Vietnam) Lê Quang Trãi	(Vietnam) Hoàng Vĩnh Nguyên	(Vietnam) Motive	None	List: Front: None; Back: None; Sleeves: None; Shorts: None				
Hong Linh Ha Tinh	(Vietnam) Phan Như Thuật	(Vietnam) Nguyễn Trọng Hoàng	(Thailand) Grand Sport	Bia Sao Vàng	List: Front: Savabeco; Back: None; Sleeves: None; Shorts: None				
Ninh Binh	(Vietnam) Chu Đình Nghiêm	(Vietnam) Nguyễn Hoàng Đức	(Thailand) Grand Sport	LPBank	List: Front: None; Back: ThaiGroup; Sleeves: None; Shorts: None				
SHB Da Nang	(South Korea) Lee Young-jin	(Vietnam) Quế Ngọc Hải	(Vietnam) Wika	SHB	List: Front: Takara; Back: 389 Corporation, Murata; Sleeves: None; Shorts: None				
Song Lam Nghe An	(Vietnam) Văn Sỹ Sơn	(Vietnam) Hồ Khắc Ngọc	(Vietnam) Kamito	Bia Sao Vàng	List: Front: Savabeco; Back: Eurosun; Sleeves: None; Shorts: None				
Thanh Hoa	(South Korea) Kim Young-chul	(Kyrgyzstan) Odilzhon Abdurakhmanov	(Japan) Jogarbola	None	List: Front: None; Back: None; Sleeves: None; Shorts: None				
The Cong-Viettel	(Brazil) Guilherme Almeida	(Vietnam) Bùi Tiến Dũng	(China) Li-Ning	Thể Công-Viettel	List: Front: None; Back: TV360; Sleeves: None; Shorts: None				
Thep Xanh Nam Dinh	(Vietnam) Vũ Hồng Việt	(Vietnam) Trần Nguyên Mạnh	(Japan) Jogarbola	Thép Xanh Xuân Thiện	List: Front: None; Back: Xi Măng Xuân Thành; Sleeves: None; Shorts: None				

Notes

1. Apparel made by club

=== Managerial changes ===
Team	Outgoing manager	Manner of departure	Date of vacancy	Position in the table	Incoming manager	Date of appointment
Thanh Hoa	(Vietnam) Nguyễn Anh Đức	Mutual consent	5 September 2026	Pre-season	(Vietnam) Mai Xuân Hợp (caretaker)	5 September 2026
Cong An Ho Chi Minh City	(Vietnam) Phùng Thanh Phương	Appointed as assistant coach	15 July 2026	Pre-season	(Australia) Arthur Diles	15 July 2026
The Cong-Viettel	(Bulgaria) Velizar Popov	Resigned	31 October 2026	12th	(Brazil) Guilherme Almeida (caretaker)	1 November 2026
Thanh Hoa	(Vietnam) Mai Xuân Hợp (caretaker)	Caretaker period ended	6 November 2026	11th	(South Korea) Kim Young-chul	6 November 2026
SHB Da Nang	(Vietnam) Lê Đức Tuấn	Appointed as technical director	16 November 2026	8th	(South Korea) Lee Young-jin	17 November 2026
Haiphong	(Vietnam) Đặng Văn Thành	Resigned	17 November 2026	6th	(South Korea) Lee Gi-nam	21 November 2026

== Foreign players ==
Teams are allowed to register 4 foreign players, while teams that participate in any intercontentinal or sub-contentinal competition are allowed to register 7 foreign players, but only 4 players are allowed to be registered each game. Furthermore, teams can register up to 2 foreign players with Vietnamese heritage.

Players name in bold indicates the player was registered after the start of the season.

Club	Player 1	Player 2	Player 3	Player 4	Player 5 (Unnaturalized Vietnamese player)	Player 6 (Unnaturalized Vietnamese player)	Player 7 (AFC and AFF competitions)	Player 8 (AFC and AFF competitions)	Player 9 (AFC and AFF competitions)	Unregistred / Former players
Bac Ninh	(Brazil) Brenner Marlos	(Brazil) Rafael Santos	(Brazil) Vitão	(England) David Fisher	(Canada) Pierre Lamothe	(United States) Reece Gaylor				
Cong An Hanoi	(Australia) Stefan Mauk	(Brazil) Léo Artur	(Brazil) Alan Grafite	(Colombia) Brayan Perea	(France) Kevin Pham Ba		(Spain) Damià Sabater	(Iraq) Frans Putros	(Togo) David Henen	
Cong An Ho Chi Minh City	(Angola) Aldaír Ferreira	(Australia) Jason Cummings	(Brazil) Léo Gomes	(Colombia) Juanjo Narváez	(Belgium) Lenn-Minh Tran		(France) Arthur Yamga	(Netherlands) Dirk Abels		
Dong Nai City	(Romania) Andrei Ivan	(Serbia) Filip Jović	(Serbia) Andrija Majdevac	(Serbia) Miloš Vulić						
Haiphong	(Cameroon) Joel Tagueu	(Equatorial Guinea) Esteban Obiang	(Serbia) Milan Makarić	(Uganda) Joseph Mpande	(Canada) Camilo Vasconcelos					(Haiti) Bicou Bissainthe
Hanoi FC	(Brazil) Adriel	(Curaçao) Kevin Felida	(France) Andrew Jung	(Israel) Yuval Sade	(France) Aymeric Faurand-Tournaire					(Australia) Adam Taggart (Republic of Ireland) Cyrus Christie
Hoang Anh Gia Lai	(Brazil) Luann Augusto	(Brazil) Júlio César	(Brazil) Matheus Lucas	(Brazil) Robson Reis						
Hong Linh Ha Tinh	(Brazil) Luiz Antônio	(Brazil) Helerson	(Brazil) Daniel Passira	(Nigeria) Charles Atshimene	(France) Ranhi Moreau Nguyen	(United States) Ian Mai				
Ninh Binh	(Brazil) Lucas Turci	(Brazil) Romeu	(Brazil) Lucão do Break	(Nigeria) Fred Friday						(Brazil) Marciel
SHB Da Nang	(Argentina) Joel López Pissano	(Serbia) Ivan Šaponjić	(Uruguay) Yvo Calleros	(Uruguay) Matías Fracchia	(France) Kalvin Luong	(Republic of Ireland) Bryan Ly				
Song Lam Nghe An	(Brazil) Luizão	(Brazil) Bruno Paraíba	(Brazil) Jairo Rodrigues	(Nigeria) Joseph Onoja	(France) Abdel-Amine Tran	(France) Phi-Long Tran				(Brazil) Gabriel Moysés
Thanh Hoa	(Brazil) Matheus Martins	(Croatia) Di Mateo Lovrić	(Kyrgyzstan) Odiljon Abdurakhmanov	(Mali) Saliou Guindo	(Laos) Damoth Thongkhamsavath					
The Cong-Viettel	(Brazil) Lucas Alves	(Brazil) Júnior Brandão	(Brazil) Paulinho Curuá	(Brazil) André Luiz	(Poland) Damian Vu Thanh		(Brazil) Wesley Natã	(Brazil) Ribamar	(Brazil) Hernandes Rodrigues	
Thep Xanh Nam Dinh	(Brazil) Caio César	(Brazil) Ezequiel	(Brazil) Rômulo	(Cameroon) Félix Eboa Eboa	(Austria) Van-Alessandro Nguyen Skyriotis	(Canada) Tyler Crawford				

=== Dual nationality Vietnamese players ===
- Players name in **bold** indicates the player was registered after the start of the season.
- Player's name in italics indicates Overseas Vietnamese players whom have obtained a Vietnamese passport and citizenship, therefore being considered as local players.

Club	Player 1	Player 2	Player 3	Player 4
Bac Ninh	(Canada) (Vietnam) Aaron Tú Vinh Napierala			
Cong An Hanoi	(France) (Vietnam) Cao Pendant Quang Vinh^{1}	(France) (Vietnam) Nguyễn Adou Leygley Minh^{1}	(Czech Republic) (Vietnam) Nguyễn Filip^{1}	
Cong An Ho Chi Minh City	(Australia) (Vietnam) Ngô Đăng Khoa^{1}	(England) (Vietnam) Williams Minh Hoàng^{1}	(Nigeria) (Vietnam) Olaha Mạnh Đức	(Slovakia) (Vietnam) Lê Giang Patrik^{1}
Dong Nai City				
Haiphong				
Hanoi FC	(Brazil) (Vietnam) Đỗ Hoàng Hên^{1}			
Hoang Anh Gia Lai				
Hong Linh Ha Tinh				
Ninh Binh	(Brazil) (Vietnam) Nguyễn Tài Lộc^{1}	(Bulgaria) (Vietnam) Trần Thành Trung	(Russia) (Vietnam) Đặng Văn Lâm^{1}	
SHB Da Nang				
Song Lam Nghe An	(Italy) (Vietnam) Roberto Cittadini			
Thanh Hoa				
The Cong-Viettel	(Australia) (Vietnam) Caruso Minh Khang	(Jamaica) Rimario Gordon^{2}	(United States) (Vietnam) Lương Chí Khải	
Thep Xanh Nam Dinh	(Brazil) (Vietnam) Nguyễn Xuân Son^{1}			

Notes:

^1 Capped for Vietnam national team.
^2 Player is under the process of Vietnamese naturalization, thus is not counted as a foreign player slot.

== League table ==
Pos	Team	Pld	W	D	L	GF	GA	GD	Pts	Qualification or relegation
1	Thep Xanh Nam Dinh	8	6	1	1	18	7	+11	19	Qualification for the AFC Champions League Two group stage and ASEAN Club Championship group stage (Note: The winners of the 2026–27 Vietnamese Cup also qualify for the ASEAN Club Championship group stage. If the Vietnamese Cup winners is also the V.League 1 winners, the ASEAN Club Championship group stage spot will be passed to third-placed team.)
2	Ninh Binh	8	5	1	2	15	10	+5	16	Qualification for the AFC Champions League Two qualifying play-offs
3	Song Lam Nghe An	8	3	5	0	13	7	+6	14	
4	Cong An Hanoi	7	4	2	1	11	5	+6	14	
5	Hong Linh Ha Tinh	8	4	2	2	12	10	+2	14	
6	Thanh Hoa	8	3	3	2	11	11	0	12	
7	Hanoi FC	8	4	0	4	11	13	−2	12	
8	Haiphong	8	3	1	4	15	14	+1	10	
9	Cong An Ho Chi Minh City	8	3	1	4	8	8	0	10	
10	SHB Da Nang	8	3	0	5	8	13	−5	9	
11	Bac Ninh	7	2	2	3	5	6	−1	8	
12	The Cong-Viettel	8	1	3	4	7	11	−4	6	
13	Hoang Anh Gia Lai	8	2	0	6	10	17	−7	6	Relegation to V.League 2
14	Dong Nai City	8	1	1	6	2	14	−12	4	Relegation to V.League 2

Updated to match(es) played on 21 November 2026. Source: VPF
Rules for classification: 1) Points; 2) Head-to-head points; 3) Head-to-head goal difference; 4) Head-to-head goals scored; 5) Goal difference; 6) Goals scored; 7) Away goals scored; 8) Disciplinary points.

== Results ==
Home \ Away	BNI	CAH	CHC	DNC	HPG	HAN	HGL	HHT	NBI	SDN	SNA	THH	TCV	TND
Bac Ninh	—		1–0	0–0			1–0							
Cong An Hanoi		—	2–1			1–2		2–0				1–1	a	
Cong An Ho Chi Minh City			—			3–1				0–1			1–0	
Dong Nai City		0–3		—		1–3				1–0			0–2	0–4
Haiphong				1–0	—				1–4		2–2	1–2		
Hanoi FC	1–0	a				—			2–1		1–4		a	
Hoang Anh Gia Lai					1–3	2–1	—			3–0	0–2			
Hong Linh Ha Tinh			2–1	1–0	2–1			—			2–2			1–2
Ninh Binh	2–1		0–1				4–3		—			2–1		
SHB Da Nang					1–5	1–0			0–1	—				3–0
Song Lam Nghe An	1–0	1–1	1–1			a					—			
Thanh Hoa							2–1	1–1		3–2		—		0–2
The Cong-Viettel	2–2	0–1				a		1–3			0–0	1–1	—	
Thep Xanh Nam Dinh					2–1		4–0		1–1				3–1	—

Updated to match(es) played on 22 November 2026. Source: VPF
Legend: Blue = home team win; Yellow = draw; Red = away team win.
For upcoming matches, an "a" indicates there is an article about the rivalry between the two participants.

=== Position by round ===
Team ╲ Round	1	2	3	4	5	6	7	8	9	10	11	12	13	14	15	16	17	18	19	20	21	22	23	24	25	26
Cong An Hanoi	5	3	1	2	3	3	2																			
The Cong-Viettel	4	7	9	11	12	12	13	12																		
Ninh Binh	2	1	2	1	4	5	4																			
Hanoi FC	10	13	13	9	10	9	9	7																		
Cong An Ho Chi Minh City	3	6	7	5	5	6	7																			
Thep Xanh Nam Dinh	1	5	6	4	2	1	1	1	1																	
Haiphong	13	10	11	7	8	7	6																			
Hong Linh Ha Tinh	11	11	5	6	6	4	5																			
Song Lam Nghe An	7	2	3	3	1	2	3																			
Hoang Anh Gia Lai	14	14	12	12	13	13	12	13																		
Thanh Hoa	6	8	4	8	7	11	11	6																		
SHB Da Nang	8	4	8	13	9	8	8																			
Dong Nai City	12	12	14	14	14	14	14	14																		
Bac Ninh	9	9	10	10	11	10	10																			

Champion and qualification to the AFC Champions League Two group stage and ASEAN Club Championship
Qualification to the AFC Champions League Two preliminary stage
Relegation to V.League 2

Source: VPF

== Statistics ==
=== Top goalscorers ===
As of 22 November 2026

Rank	Player	Club	Goals
1	(Serbia) Milan Makaric	Haiphong	8
2	(Brazil) Daniel Passira	Hong Linh Ha Tinh	6
3	(Brazil) Lucão do Break	Ninh Binh	5
3	(Cameroon) Joel Tagueu	Haiphong	5
5	(Vietnam) Nguyễn Lê Phát	Ninh Binh	4
5	(Brazil) Luizão	Song Lam Nghe An	4
5	(Brazil) Alan Grafite	Cong An Hanoi	4
5	(Mali) Saliou Guindo	Thanh Hoa	4
5	(Brazil) Luiz Antônio	Hong Linh Ha Tinh	4
10	(Vietnam) Nguyễn Quang Vinh	Song Lam Nghe An	3
10	(Serbia) Ivan Šaponjić	SHB Da Nang	3
10	(Brazil) Brenner Marlos	Bac Ninh	3
10	(Brazil) Léo Artur	Cong An Hanoi	3
10	(Vietnam) Trần Ngọc Sơn	Thep Xanh Nam Dinh	3
10	(Brazil) Luann Augusto	Hoang Anh Gia Lai	3
10	(Brazil) Caio César	Thep Xanh Nam Dinh	3
10	(Vietnam) Trần Mạnh Quỳnh	Thep Xanh Nam Dinh	3
10	(Vietnam) Nguyễn Hoàng Đức	Ninh Binh	3

==== Hat-tricks ====
Player	For	Against	Result	Date
(Brazil) Lucão do Break	Ninh Binh	Haiphong	4–1 (A)	5 September 2026
(Cameroon) Joel Tagueu	Haiphong	SHB Da Nang	5–1 (A)	17 October 2026

=== Clean sheets ===
As of 22 November 2026

Rank	Player	Club	Clean sheets
1	(Vietnam) Nguyễn Filip	Cong An Hanoi	3
1	(Vietnam) Trần Nguyên Mạnh	Thep Xanh Nam Dinh	3
1	(Vietnam) Nguyễn Văn Công	Bac Ninh	3
1	(Vietnam) Đỗ Sỹ Huy	SHB Da Nang	3
1	(Vietnam) Cao Văn Bình	Song Lam Nghe An	3
6	(Vietnam) Nguyễn Văn Việt	The Cong–Viettel	2
6	(Vietnam) Lê Giang Patrik	Cong An Ho Chi Minh City	2
6	(Vietnam) Phạm Văn Phong	Dong Nai City	2
9
9	(Vietnam) Nguyễn Văn Toản	Haiphong	1
9	(Vietnam) Trần Trung Kiên	Hoang Anh Gia Lai	1
9	(Vietnam) Nguyễn Thanh Tùng	Hong Linh Ha Tinh	1
9	(Vietnam) Quan Văn Chuẩn	Hanoi FC	1
9	(Vietnam) Đặng Văn Lâm	Ninh Binh	1
