= 2026–27 Ratchaburi F.C. season =

Ratchaburi
2026–27 season
- Chairman: (Thailand) Tanawat Nitikarnchana
- Manager: (Thailand) Worrawoot Srimaka
- Stadium: Dragon Solar Park, Mueang Ratchaburi, Ratchaburi, Thailand
- Thai League T1: Pre-season
- Thai FA Cup: First round
- Thai League Cup: First round
- AFC Champions League Elite: League stage
- ASEAN Club Championship: Group stage
Home colours	Away colours	Third colours

The 2026-27 season is Ratchaburi Football Club's 20th existence. It is the 9th season in the Thai League and the club's 14th consecutive season in the top flight of the Thai football league system since promoted in the 2013 season. In this season, Ratchaburi participates in 5 competitions which consisted of the Thai League, FA Cup, League Cup, AFC Champions League Two and ASEAN Club Championship.

== Squad ==
As of 15 August 2024

Squad No.	Name	Nationality	Date of Birth (Age)	Previous Club
Goalkeepers
1	Nopphon Lakhonphon	(Thailand)	19 July 2000 (age 26)	(Thailand) Nakhon Ratchasima
18	Thanawit Uamsa-Ard	(Thailand)	19 May 2002 (age 24)	(Thailand) Hua Hin City FC
39	Atituch Chankar	(Thailand)	15 February 2005 (age 21)	(Thailand) Mahasarakham
46	Peerapong Watjanapayon	(Thailand)	23 May 2003 (age 23)	(Thailand) Fleet FC
97	Ukrit Wongmeema	(Thailand)	9 July 1991 (age 35)	(Thailand) Kasetsart
99	Kampol Pathomakkakul (Vice-captain)	(Thailand)	27 July 1992 (age 34)	(Thailand) Muangthong United
Defenders
3	Tarek Aggoun	(Algeria) (France)	27 October 1997 (age 29)	(Iraq) Al-Shorta
4	Jonathan Khemdee	(Thailand) (Denmark)	9 May 2002 (age 24)	(Denmark) OB Odense (D1)
5	Daniel Ting	(Malaysia) (England)	1 December 1992 (age 33)	(Malaysia) Sabah
15	Adisorn Promrak	(Thailand)	21 October 1993 (age 33)	(Thailand) Port
17	Sidcley	(Brazil)	13 May 1993 (age 33)	(Greece) Lamia (G1)
20	Sanchai Nontasila	(Thailand)	30 March 1996 (age 30)	(Thailand) BG Pathum United
23	Kevin Deeromram	(Thailand) (Sweden)	11 September 1997 (age 29)	(Malaysia) Selangor
27	Jesse Curran	(Philippines) (Australia)	16 July 1996 (age 30)	(Thailand) BG Pathum United
29	Kiatisak Jiamudom	(Thailand)	19 March 1995 (age 31)	(Thailand) Chainat Hornbill
31	Sai van Wermeskerken	(Japan) (Netherlands)	28 June 1994 (age 32)	(Japan) Kawasaki Frontale
33	Pethay Promjan	(Thailand)	23 March 2006 (age 20)	(Thailand) Suphanburi
44	Pablo Insua	(Spain)	9 September 1993 (age 33)	(Spain) Real Zaragoza
66	Alex Gountounas	(Thailand) (Australia)	25 April 2005 (age 21)	(Thailand) Uthai Thani
Midfielders
6	Tana	(Spain)	20 September 1990 (age 36)	(Spain) CD Mensajero (S5)
8	Thanawat Suengchitthawon	(Thailand) (France)	8 January 2000 (age 26)	(Thailand) Muangthong United
16	Roque Mesa (Note: Mesa registered for ACL Elite only)	(Spain)	7 June 1989 (age 37)	(Malaysia) Johor Darul Ta'zim
17	Sirawit Kasonsumol	(Thailand)	23 September 2004 (age 22)	(Thailand) Marines
19	Teeraphol Yoryoei	(Thailand)	25 October 1994 (age 32)	(Thailand) Muangthong United
21	Ekanit Panya	(Thailand)	21 October 1999 (age 27)	(Thailand) BG Pathum United
22	Pongsathon Sangkasopha	(Thailand)	19 October 2006 (age 20)	(Thailand) Khon Kaen United
28	Thossawat Limwannasathian	(Thailand)	17 May 1993 (age 33)	(Thailand) Bangkok United
37	Kritsananon Srisuwan	(Thailand)	11 January 1995 (age 31)	(Thailand) Bangkok
42	Sorawit Panthong	(Thailand)	20 February 1997 (age 29)	(Thailand) Muangthong United
48	Scott Allardice	(Scotland)	31 March 1998 (age 28)	(Cambodia) Visakha FC
66	Natthawat Prompakdee	(Thailand)	7 June 2005 (age 21)	Youth team
88	Chotipat Poomkaew	(Thailand)	28 May 1998 (age 28)	(Thailand) Chiangrai United
94	Thiraphat Yuyen	(Thailand)	14 February 2006 (age 20)	Youth Team
Forwards
7	Rafael Bilú	(Brazil)	21 April 1999 (age 27)	(Brazil) Avaí FC
9	Bruno Mendes	(Brazil)	2 August 1994 (age 32)	(Uruguay) Deportivo Maldonado
11	Jordan Gele	(France)	16 September 1992 (age 34)	(Qatar) Al Kharaitiyat
32	Robert Žulj	(Austria) (Croatia)	5 February 1992 (age 34)	(Thailand) Buriram United
92	Njiva Rakotoharimalala	(Madagascar)	6 August 1992 (age 34)	(Saudi Arabia) Al Jandal (S2)
	Gleyson García	(Brazil)	18 November 1996 (age 30)	(Japan) Oita Trinita (J2)
Players loaned out during season
21	Jirawat Thongsaengphrao	(Thailand)	31 March 1998 (age 28)	(Thailand) Chanthaburi FC
Players left during season
10	Jonathan Viera	(Spain)	21 October 1989 (age 37)	(Spain) Las Palmas

== Transfer ==
=== In ===
Pre-Season

Date	Position	Player	Transferred from	Fee	Ref
First team
31 May 2026	DF	(Thailand) Apisit Sorada	(Thailand) PT Prachuap	End of loan	
31 May 2026	DF	(Thailand) Jirawat Thongsaengphrao	(Thailand) Chanthaburi FC	End of loan	
31 May 2026	GK	(Thailand) Kritsanucha Mueansen	(Thailand) Rajpracha (T2)	End of loan	
31 May 2026	MF	(Thailand) Pongsathon Sangkasopha	(Thailand) Khon Kaen United (T2)	End of loan	
31 May 2026	MF	(Thailand) Sirawit Kasonsumol	(Thailand) Marines (T3)	End of loan	
1 June 2026	DF	(Malaysia) (England) Daniel Ting	(Malaysia) Johor Darul Ta'zim	Free	
10 June 2026	MF	(Thailand) Ekanit Panya	(Thailand) BG Pathum United	Season loan	
1 July 2026	FW	(Brazil) Rafael Bilú	(Brazil) Avaí FC	Undisclosed	
2 July 2026	GK	(Thailand) Nopphon Lakhonphon	(Thailand) Buriram United	Undisclosed	
2 July 2026	MF	(Thailand) Sorawit Panthong	(Thailand) Muangthong United	Undisclosed	
3 July 2026	DF	(Thailand) (Australia) Alex Gountounas	(Thailand) Uthai Thani	Undisclosed	
3 July 2026	DF	(Thailand) Sanchai Nontasila	(Thailand) BG Pathum United	Undisclosed	
7 July 2026	FW	(France) Jordan Gele	(Qatar) Al Kharaitiyat	Undisclosed	
10 July 2026	FW	(Brazil) Bruno Mendes	(Uruguay) Deportivo Maldonado	Free	
13 July 2026	DF	(Algeria) (France) Tarek Aggoun	(Iraq) Al-Shorta	Undisclosed	
30 July 2026	DF	(Japan) (Netherlands) Sai van Wermeskerken	N.A.	Free	
30 July 2026	MF	(Spain) Jonathan Viera	(Spain) Las Palmas	Free	
16 September 2026	MF	(Austria) Robert Žulj	(Thailand) Buriram United	Season loan	
1 October 2026	DF	(Spain) Pablo Insua	(Spain) Real Zaragoza	Free	

Mid-Season

Date	Position	Player	Transferred from	Fee
First team

=== Out ===
Pre-Season

Date	Position	Player	Transferred To	Fee	Ref
First team
27 May 2026	MF	(Thailand) Jakkaphan Kaewprom	(Thailand) Port	Free	
31 May 2026	DF	(Malaysia) (England) Daniel Ting	(Malaysia) Johor Darul Ta'zim	End of loan	
31 May 2026	MF	(Thailand) Jaroensak Wonggorn	(Thailand) BG Pathum United	End of loan	
17 June 2026	DF	(Thailand) Suporn Peenagatapho	(Thailand) Uthai Thani	Free	
15 June 2026	DF	(Thailand) Apisit Sorada	(Thailand) Kanchanaburi Power	Free	
29 June 2026	DF	(France) (Democratic Republic of the Congo) Gabriel Mutombo	(Indonesia) Persib Bandung	Free	
30 June 2026	DF	(Brazil) Sidcley	N.A.	Free	(Note: Sidcley returns to club on 19 Oct.)
30 June 2026	MF	(Brunei) (United States) Faiq Bolkiah	(Greece)	Free	
30 June 2026	FW	(Brazil) Negueba	(Thailand) Chonburi	Free	
30 July 2026	MF	(Thailand) Siwakorn Jakkuprasat	(Thailand) Kasetsart	Free	
6 August 2026	FW	(Brazil) Denílson	(Indonesia) Dewa United	Undisclosed	
11 October 2026	MF	(Spain) Jonathan Viera	Retired	N.A.	

Mid-Season

Date	Position	Player	Transferred To	Fee	Ref
First team

== Friendlies ==
=== Pre-Season Friendly ===
Win Draw Loss

25 July 2026 1	Ratchaburi (Thailand)	6–0	(Thailand) Samut Songkhram City	Ratchaburi
	Jordan Gele 42' 54'; Tana 63'; Bruno Mendes 72' 81' (pen.); Ekanit Panya 75'			Stadium: Dragon Solar Park

28 July 2026 2	Ratchaburi (Thailand)	0–4	(Malaysia) Selangor	Ratchaburi
			Chrigor 39' (pen.); Peter Makrillos 45+1'; Aliff Izwan 67'; Richmond Ankrah 89'	Stadium: Dragon Solar Park; Referee: Songkran Bunmeekiart (Thailand)

31 July 2026 3	Ratchaburi (Thailand)	2–0	(Hong Kong) Kitchee SC	Ratchaburi
				Stadium: Dragon Solar Park

5 August 2026 4	Ratchaburi (Thailand)	6–2	(Hong Kong) FC Eastern	Ratchaburi
	Bruno Mendes 5' 8'; Jordan Gele 47' 50'; Tarek Aggoun 73'		42'; 59'	Stadium: Dragon Solar Park

9 August 2026 5	Ratchaburi (Thailand)	0–2	(Thailand) Buriram United	Ratchaburi
			Guilherme Bissoli 35'; Darlan 74'	Stadium: Dragon Solar Park

12 August 2026 6	Ratchaburi (Thailand)	cancelled	(Thailand) Thap Luang United	Ratchaburi
				Stadium: Dragon Solar Park

12 August 2026 7	Hua Hin (Thailand)	0–6	(Thailand) Ratchaburi	Hua Hin
			Pongsathon Sangkasopha; Jonathan Vieira (pen.); Rafael Bilou	Stadium: True Arena Hua Hin

19 August 2026 8	Ratchaburi (Thailand)	0–1	(Thailand) Chonburi	Ratchaburi
				Stadium: Dragon Solar Park

22 August 2026 9	Ratchaburi (Thailand)	0–0	(Thailand) BG Pathum United	Ratchaburi
				Stadium: Dragon Solar Park

26 August 2026 10	Port (Thailand)	1–0	(Thailand) Ratchaburi	Bangkok
				Stadium: PAT Stadium

29 August 2026 11	Ratchaburi (Thailand)	5–0	(Thailand) Bangkok	Ratchaburi
				Stadium: Dragon Solar Park

=== In-Season Friendly ===
2 October 2026 1	PT Prachuap	0–1	Ratchaburi	Prachuap
			Ekanit Panya	Stadium: Sam Ao Stadium

== Competitions ==
=== Overview ===
Competition	First match	Last match	Starting round	Record							
Competition	First match	Last match	Starting round	Pld	W	D	L	GF	GA	GD	Win %
Thai League 1	5 September 2026		Matchday 1	9	4	1	4	18	11	+7	44.44
Thai FA Cup	21 October 2026		First round	1	1	0	0	4	2	+2	100.00
Thai League Cup				0	0	0	0	0	0	+0	—
AFC Champions League Elite	15 September 2026		League stage	4	0	1	3	6	10	−4	0.00
ASEAN Club Championship	7 October 2026		Group stage	2	0	1	1	3	4	−1	0.00
Total				16	5	3	8	31	27	+4	31.25

Last updated: 21 November 2026
Source: Competitions

=== Thai League 1 ===
==== Matches ====
Win Draw Loss

5 September 2026 1	Ayutthaya United	2–1	Ratchaburi	Ayutthaya
	Hwang Hyun-soo 8'; Ewerton 81'; Willen Mota (yellow card) 10'; Sanrawat Dechmitr (yellow card) 90+5'		Thanawat Suengchitthawon 43'; Bruno Mendes (yellow card) 40'; Daniel Ting (yellow card) 50'	Stadium: Ayutthaya Province Stadium; Attendance: 2,685; Referee: Alongkorn Khonwai

11 September 2026 2	Ratchaburi	1–0	Bangkok United	Ratchaburi
	Bruno Mendes 13'; Roque Mesa (yellow card) 40'		Everton (yellow card) 50'	Stadium: Dragon Solar Park; Attendance: 3,719; Referee: Wiwat Jumpaoon

20 September 2026 3	Rayong	1–1	Ratchaburi	Rayong
	João Felipe 73' (pen.); Bruno Leite (yellow card) 45+3'		Ekanit Panya 34'; Roque Mesa (yellow card) 13'; Chotipat Poomkaew (yellow card) 89'	Stadium: Rayong Province Stadium; Attendance: 4,236; Referee: Peerasan Krataithong

10 October 2026 4	Ratchaburi	6–0	Sukhothai	Ratchaburi
	Ekanit Panya 13', 35'; Tarek Aggoun 56'; Robert Žulj 68'; Tana 84'; Njiva Rakotoharimalala 89'; Adisorn Promrak (red card) 27'		Thiti Thumporn (yellow card) 45+3'	Stadium: Dragon Solar Park; Attendance: 3,545; Referee: Komgrit Ponpasit

18 October 2026 5	Chiangrai United	1–2	Ratchaburi	Chiangrai
	Dudu Silva 71'; Zé Ricardo (yellow card) 88'		Pattarapon Suksakit 31' (o.g.); Robert Žulj 67'; Thanawat Suengchitthawon (yellow card) 38'	Stadium: Singha Chiangrai Stadium; Attendance: 7,378; Referee: Sivakorn Pu-udom

24 October 2026 6	Ratchaburi	1–2	Chonburi	Ratchaburi
	Sai van Wermeskerken 38' (yellow card) 41'; Tarek Aggoun (yellow card) 21'		Stenio Júnior 61' (yellow card) 35'; Kike Linares 75'; Wellington Priori (yellow card) 86'; Kevin Ray Mendoza (yellow card) 88'; Chaowat Veerachart (yellow card) 90+3'	Stadium: Dragon Solar Park; Attendance: 3,777; Referee: Pawara Seejen

30 October 2026 7	Sisaket United	2–5	Ratchaburi	Sisaket
	Jefinho 27'; Narongrit Kamnet 41'; Sakkranvit Nimma (yellow card) 45+1'		Pongsathon Sangkasopha 57', 61', 71', 87'; Ekanit Panya 65'; Jesse Curran (yellow card) 72'; Roque Mesa (yellow card) 75'	Stadium: Sri Nakhon Lamduan Stadium; Attendance: 11,029; Referee: Kotchapoom Meesridaecha

8 November 2026 8	Ratchaburi	1–2	Buriram United	Ratchaburi
	Njiva Rakotoharimalala 79'; Roque Mesa (yellow card) 36'		Pansa Hemviboon 16' (yellow card) 39'; Sebas Moyano 90+4'; Stefan Schimmer (yellow card) 36'	Stadium: Dragon Solar Park; Attendance: 8,795; Referee: Sivakorn Pu-udom

21 November 2026 9	Ratchaburi	0–1	PT Prachuap	Ratchaburi
	Sorawit Panthong (yellow card) 33'; Thossawat Limwanasathian (yellow card) 53'; Tauã (yellow card) 90+3'		Lucas Grossi 15'	Stadium: Dragon Solar Park; Attendance: 3,738; Referee: Panumas Phansamo

3 January 2027 10 (Rescheduled)	BG Pathum United	–	Ratchaburi	Pathum Thani
				Stadium: True BG Stadium

6 December 2026 11	Ratchaburi	–	Uthai Thani	Ratchaburi
				Stadium: Dragon Solar Park

12 December 2026 12	Port	–	Ratchaburi	Bangkok
				Stadium: PAT Stadium

20 December 2026 13	Ratchaburi	–	Pattani	Ratchaburi
				Stadium: Dragon Solar Park

24 December 2026 14	Lamphun Warriors	–	Ratchaburi	Lamphun
				Stadium: Lamphun Warriors Stadium

27 December 2026 15	Ratchaburi	–	Rasisalai United	Ratchaburi
				Stadium: Dragon Solar Park

31 January 2027 16	Bangkok United	–	Ratchaburi	Pathum Thani
				Stadium: True BG Stadium

7 February 2027 17	Ratchaburi	–	Rayong	Ratchaburi
				Stadium: Dragon Solar Park

21 February 2027 18	Sukhothai	–	Ratchaburi	Sukhothai
				Stadium: Thalay Luang Stadium

28 February 2027 19	Ratchaburi	–	Chiangrai United	Ratchaburi
				Stadium: Dragon Solar Park

6 March 2027 20	Chonburi	–	Ratchaburi	Chonburi
				Stadium: Chonburi Stadium

13 March 2027 21	Ratchaburi	–	Sisaket United	Ratchaburi
				Stadium: Dragon Solar Park

21 March 2027 22	Buriram United	–	Ratchaburi	Buriram
				Stadium: Chang Arena

4 April 2027 23	PT Prachuap	–	Ratchaburi	Prachuap
				Stadium: Sam Ao Stadium

18 April 2027 24	Ratchaburi	–	BG Pathum United	Ratchaburi
				Stadium: Dragon Solar Park

24 April 2027 25	Uthai Thani	–	Ratchaburi	Uthai Thani
				Stadium: Uthai Thani Province Stadium

2 May 2027 26	Ratchaburi	–	Port	Ratchaburi
				Stadium: Dragon Solar Park

9 May 2027 27	Pattani	v	Ratchaburi	Pattani
				Stadium: Pattani Province Stadium

15 May 2027 28	Ratchaburi	–	Lamphun Warriors	Ratchaburi
				Stadium: Dragon Solar Park

22 May 2027 29	Rasisalai United	v	Ratchaburi	Sisaket
				Stadium: Sisaket Provincial Stadium

30 May 2027 30	Ratchaburi	–	Ayutthaya United	Ratchaburi
				Stadium: Dragon Solar Park

Pos	Team	Pld	W	D	L	GF	GA	GD	Pts
5	Buriram United	7	5	1	1	13	8	+5	16
6	Uthai Thani	9	4	2	3	17	14	+3	14
7	Ratchaburi	9	4	1	4	18	11	+7	13
8	Sukhothai	9	4	1	4	15	17	−2	13
9	BG Pathum United	8	3	3	2	12	8	+4	12

Updated to match(es) played on 21 November 2026. Source: Thai League 1 2026–27
Rules for classification: 1) Points; 2) Goal difference; 3) Goals scored.

=== Thai FA Cup ===
Win Draw Loss

21 October 2026 Rd of 64	Ratchaburi	4–2	Pattani	Ratchaburi
	Maicon Douglas 8' (o.g.); Sanchai Nontasila 53'; Phongsakon Sangkasopha 42', 62'; Thossawat Limwanasathian (yellow card) 90+3'		Imron Hayiyusoh 81'; Clayton Silva 90+3'; Janepob Phokhi (yellow card) 45'	Stadium: Dragon Solar Park; Attendance: 2,620; Referee: Chaiya Moolmanee

3-4 February 2027 Rd of 32	Songkhla	–	Ratchaburi	Songkhla
				Stadium: Tinsulanonda Stadium

=== Thai League Cup ===
8-10 December 2026 Rd of 32	Ayutthaya	–	Ratchaburi	Ayutthaya
				Stadium: Ayutthaya Province Stadium

=== AFC Champions League Elite ===
==== League stage ====
Win Draw Loss

Pos	Team	Pld	W	D	L	GF	GA	GD	Pts
12	(Thailand) Buriram United	4	0	3	1	2	3	−1	3
13	(Thailand) Port	4	1	0	3	9	14	−5	3
14	(Thailand) Ratchaburi	4	0	1	3	6	10	−4	1
15	(South Korea) Pohang Steelers	4	0	1	3	4	11	−7	1
16	(Australia) Newcastle Jets	4	0	0	4	6	19	−13	0

Updated to match(es) played on 4 November 2026. Source: AFC
Rules for classification: 1) points; 2) goal difference; 3) number of goals scored; 4) number of matches won; 5) penalty shoot-out if only two teams remain tied and played each other on the final matchday 6) fair play ranking; 7) drawing of lots

Win Draw Loss

15 September 2026 1	Ratchaburi (Thailand)	4–6	(China) Shanghai Port	Ratchaburi, Thailand
	Njiva Rakotoharimalala 71', 84', 90+5'; Ekanit Panya 90+6'; Roque Mesa (yellow card) 75'; Thossawat Limwannasathian (yellow card) 77'	Report	Prince Ampem 31', 36', 45+1'; Wu Lei 51'; Jaume Grau 86'; Ekanit Panya 90+7'; Miguel Campos (yellow card) 39'	Stadium: Ratchaburi Stadium; Attendance: 2,974; Referee: Kim Jong-hyeok (South Korea)

14 October 2026 2	Kyoto Sanga (Japan)	1–0	(Thailand) Ratchaburi	Kyoto, Japan
	Temma Matsuda 88'	Report	Jesse Curran (yellow card) 11'; Roque Mesa (yellow card) 79'	Stadium: Kyoto Stadium; Attendance: 4,582; Referee: Qasim Al-Hatmi (Oman)

27 October 2026 3	Ratchaburi (Thailand)	0–0	(Japan) Kashiwa Reysol	Ratchaburi, Thailand
	Ekanit Panya (yellow card) 51'; Tarek Aggoun (yellow card) 79'; Pablo Insua (yellow card) 90+2'	Report		Stadium: Ratchaburi Stadium; Attendance: 3,613; Referee: Majed Al-Shamrani (Saudi Arabia)

3 November 2026 4	Vissel Kobe (Japan)	3–2	(Thailand) Ratchaburi	Kobe, Japan
	Kento Hamasaki 36'; Erik 83'; Tetsushi Yamakawa 88'; Kōta Watanabe (yellow card) 27'	Report	Phongsakorn Sangkasopha 64' (yellow card) 6'; Ekanit Panya 82'; Sanchai Nontasila (yellow card) 10'; Thossawat Limwannasathian (yellow card) 40'; Daniel Ting (yellow card) 90'	Stadium: Noevir Stadium Kobe; Attendance: 7,370; Referee: Ahmad Al-Ali (Kuwait)

24 November 2026 5	Ratchaburi (Thailand)	–	(Malaysia) Johor Darul Ta'zim	Ratchaburi, Thailand
				Stadium: Ratchaburi Stadium

1 December 2026 6	Beijing Guoan (China)	–	(Thailand) Ratchaburi	Beijing, China
				Stadium: Workers' Stadium

9 February 2027 7	Ratchaburi (Thailand)	–	(Japan) Gamba Osaka	Ratchaburi, Thailand
				Stadium: Ratchaburi Stadium

16 February 2027 8	Kashima Antlers (Japan)	–	(Thailand) Ratchaburi	Kashima, Japan
				Stadium: Kashima Soccer Stadium

=== ASEAN Club Championship ===
==== Group stage ====
Pos	Team	Pld	W	D	L	GF	GA	GD	Pts	Qualification	TAM	CHC	BOR	KUC	RBM	BRU	MDF
1	(Singapore) Tampines Rovers	2	1	1	0	5	4	+1	4	Advance to knockout stage	—	9 Dec	—	—	3–2	—	24 Feb
2	(Vietnam) Công An Hồ Chí Minh City	2	1	1	0	2	1	+1	4	Advance to knockout stage	—	—	24 Feb	16 Dec	—	1–0	—
3	(Indonesia) Borneo	2	1	1	0	1	0	+1	4	Advance to knockout stage	3 Mar	—	—	—	16 Dec	—	1–0
4	(Malaysia) Kuching City	1	0	1	0	2	2	0	1	Advance to knockout stage	2–2	—	9 Dec	—	—	24 Feb	—
5	(Thailand) Ratchaburi	2	0	1	1	3	4	−1	1		—	1–1	—	31 Mar	—	—	9 Dec
6	(Thailand) Buriram United	2	0	1	1	0	1	−1	1		31 Mar	—	0–0	—	3 Mar	—	—
7	(Philippines) Manila Digger	1	0	0	1	0	1	−1	0		—	31 Mar	—	3 Mar	—	16 Dec	—

Updated to match(es) played on 18 November 2026. Source: ASEAN United
Rules for classification: Tiebreakers

7 October 2026 1	Ratchaburi (Thailand)	1–1	(Vietnam) Cong An Ho Chi Minh City	Ratchaburi, Thailand
	Scott Allardice 90+2'; Sanchai Nontasila (yellow card) 90+5'	Report	Michael Olaha 48'; Vo Minh Trong (yellow card) 2'	Stadium: Dragon Solar Park; Attendance: 1,609; Referee: Abdalla Al Harmoodi (United Arab Emirates); Man of the Match: (Nigeria) Michael Olaha

18 November 2026 2	Tampines Rovers (Singapore)	3–2	(Thailand) Ratchaburi	Jalan Besar, Singapore
	Seiga Sumi 45+1'; Hide Higashikawa 69'; Jacob Mahler 90+3'	Report	Pablo Insua 34'; Robert Zulj 67' (pen.); Sanchai Nonthasila (yellow card) 49'; Sorawit Panthong (yellow card) 76'	Stadium: Jalan Besar Stadium; Referee: Wong Wai Lun (Hong Kong)

9 December 2026 3	Ratchaburi (Thailand)	–	(Philippines) Manila Digger	Ratchaburi, Thailand
		Report		Stadium: Dragon Solar Park

16 December 2026 4	Borneo (Indonesia)	–	(Thailand) Ratchaburi	East Kalimantan, Indonesia
		Report		Stadium: Segiri Stadium

3 March 2027 5	Buriram United (Thailand)	–	(Thailand) Ratchaburi	Buriram, Thailand
		Report		Stadium: Chang Arena

31 March 2027 6	Ratchaburi (Thailand)	–	(Malaysia) Kuching City	Ratchaburi, Thailand
		Report		Stadium: Dragon Solar Park

== Team statistics ==
=== Appearances and goals ===
As of 18 Nov 26

No.	Pos.	Player	League		FA Cup		League Cup		AFC Champions League Elite		Shopee Cup		Total	
No.	Pos.	Player	Apps.	Goals	Apps.	Goals	Apps.	Goals	Apps.	Goals	Apps.	Goals	Apps.	Goals
1	GK	(Thailand) Nopphon Lakhonphon	0	0	0	0	0	0	0	0	1	0	1	0
3	DF	(Algeria) (France) Tarek Aggoun	8	1	0	0	0	0	3+1	0	0	0	12	1
4	DF	(Thailand) (Denmark) Jonathan Khemdee	3	0	0	0	0	0	1	0	0	0	4	0
5	DF	(Malaysia) (England) Daniel Ting	4+3	0	0	0	0	0	1+2	0	0	0	10	0
6	FW	(Spain) Tana	5+2	1	0	0	0	0	4	0	1	0	11	1
7	FW	(Brazil) Rafael Bilú	0+1	0	1	0	0	0	1	0	1	0	4	0
8	MF	(Thailand) (France) Thanawat Suengchitthawon	6	1	0	0	0	0	2+1	0	0	0	9	1
9	FW	(Brazil) Bruno Mendes	3+3	1	1	0	0	0	3	0	1	0	11	1
11	FW	(France) Jordan Gele	0+1	0	1	0	0	0	0	0	1	0	3	0
15	DF	(Thailand) Adisorn Promrak	1+3	0	1	0	0	0	1	0	1	0	7	0
16	MF	(Spain) Roque Mesa	7	0	0	0	0	0	3	0	0	0	10	0
17	DF	(Brazil) Sidcley	0	0	0	0	0	0	1+1	0	0	0	2	0
18	GK	(Thailand) Thanawit Uamsa-ard	0	0	0+1	0	0	0	0	0	0	0	1	0
19	MF	(Thailand) Teeraphol Yoryoei	0	0	0+1	0	0	0	0	0	1	0	2	0
20	DF	(Thailand) Sanchai Nontasila	3+2	0	1	1	0	0	1	0	1+1	0	9	1
21	MF	(Thailand) Ekanit Panya	8	3	0	0	0	0	3+1	2	0+2	0	14	5
22	MF	(Thailand) Pongsathon Sangkasopha	1+3	4	1	2	0	0	1+1	0	1+1	0	8	6
23	MF	(Thailand) (Sweden) Kevin Deeromram	0+1	0	1	0	0	0	0	0	2	0	4	0
27	DF	(Philippines) (Australia) Jesse Curran	7	0	0	0	0	0	3+1	0	0	0	11	0
28	MF	(Thailand) Thossawat Limwannasathian	2+6	0	1	0	0	0	1+3	0	0+2	0	15	0
29	DF	(Thailand) Kiatisak Jiamudom	0	0	0	0	0	0	0	0	0	0	0	0
31	DF	(Japan) (Netherlands) Sai van Wermeskerken	5+2	1	0	0	0	0	3+1	0	0+1	0	12	1
32	MF	(Austria) Robert Žulj	4+1	1	0	0	0	0	0	0	1+1	1	7	2
33	DF	(Thailand) Pethay Promjan	0+1	0	0	0	0	0	0	0	1+1	0	3	0
37	MF	(Thailand) Kritsananon Srisuwan	1+2	0	0+1	0	0	0	0	0	1	0	5	0
42	MF	(Thailand) Sorawit Panthong	0	0	1	0	0	0	0+1	0	2	0	4	0
44	DF	(Spain) Pablo Insua	0	0	0	0	0	0	3	0	2	1	5	1
46	GK	(Thailand) Peerapong Watjanapayon	0	0	0	0	0	0	0	0	0	0	0	0
48	MF	(Scotland) Scott Allardice	0	0	1	0	0	0	2+1	0	2	1	6	1
66	MF	(Thailand) Natthawat Prompakdee	0	0	0	0	0	0	0	0	0	0	0	0
88	MF	(Thailand) Chotipat Poomkaew	1+6	0	0+1	0	0	0	0+2	0	1	0	11	0
92	FW	(Madagascar) Njiva Rakotoharimalala	6+2	2	0+1	0	0	0	2+2	3	0+2	0	15	5
94	FW	(Thailand) Thiraphat Yuyen	0	0	0	0	0	0	0	0	0	0	0	0
97	GK	(Thailand) Ukrit Wongmeema	0	0	0	0	0	0	0	0	0	0	0	0
99	GK	(Thailand) Kampol Pathomakkakul	8	0	1	0	0	0	4	0	1	0	14	0
Players loaned out during season
17	MF	(Thailand) Sirawit Kasonsumol	0	0	0	0	0	0	0	0	0	0	0	0
23	MF	(Thailand) Pongsathon Sangkasopha	0	0	0	0	0	0	0	0	0	0	0	0
Players loaned out / left during season
10	MF	(Spain) Jonathan Viera	4	0	0	0	0	0	1	0	0	0	5	0
