= Abdel-Amine Tran =

French professional footballer (born 1997)

Personal information
- Full name: Abdel-Amine Duc Vinh Tran
- Date of birth: 21 November 2005 (age 21)
- Place of birth: Nogent-sur-Marne, France
- Height: 1.74 m (5 ft 9 in)
- Position: Attacking midfielder

Team information
- Current team: Song Lam Nghe An
- Number: 87

Youth career
- –2017: US Torcy
- 2017–2023: Troyes
- 2023–2024: Montfermeil

Senior career*
Years	Team	Apps	(Gls)
2024–2026	Paris 13 Atletico B		
2026	Trélissac		
2026–	Song Lam Nghe An	8	(1)
- * Club domestic league appearances and goals as of 20 November 2026

Abdel-Amine Duc Vinh Tran (born 21 November 2005) is a French professional footballer who plays as an attacking midfielder for V.League 1 club Song Lam Nghe An.

== Career ==
Tran began his youth playing for local team US Torcy, before joining the youth academy of Troyes in 2017.

In summer 2024, Tran joined the reserves team of Paris 13 Atletico.

On 2 February 2026, Tran joined Régional 1 club Trélissac and helped his team finished first in their league group, thus promoted to the Championnat National 3.

In July 2026, Tran moved to Vietnam, signing for V.League 1 club Song Lam Nghe An. In his first start for the team, his performances helped the team defeat Hanoi FC 4–1 in the second matchday of the 2026–27 V.League 1.

== Personal life ==
Tran was born to a French father of Vietnamese descent and an Algerian mother. His brother Phi-Long plays alongside him in Song Lam Nghe An.
