= Hanoi FC–Song Lam Nghe An FC rivalry =

Football rivalry in Vietnam

Hà Nội v Sông Lam Nghệ An
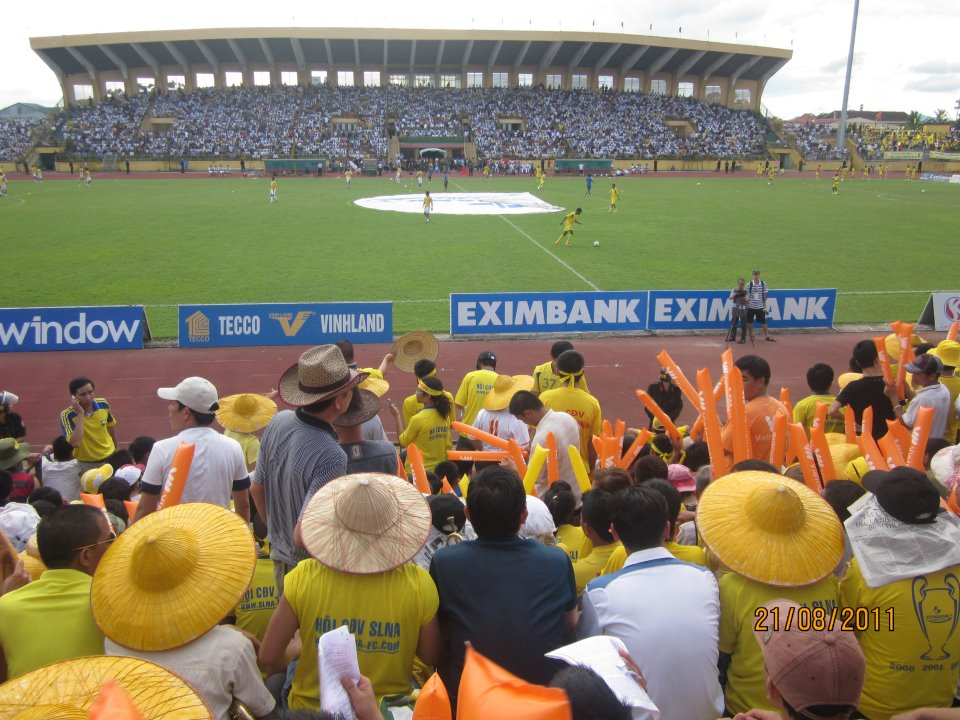
- Vinh Stadium in a match between two teams in the final round (26th round) of 2011 V-League. The match end with a 1-1 draw, helped SLNA won the league.
- Sport: Football
- Location: Viet Nam (VFF)
- Teams: Hà Nội FC; Sông Lam Nghệ An
- Broadcasters: VTV; VTC; FPT Play
- Stadiums: Hàng Đẫy Stadium and Vinh Stadium

Statistics
- Most wins: Hà Nội FC (15)
- All-time series: Hà Nội FC: 15; Drawn: 13; Sông Lam Nghệ An: 6
- Largest victory: Hà Nội FC 4–0 SLNA; V.League 1 (7 April 2019). Hà Nội FC 2–6 SLNA; V.League 1 (14 May 2012).

Hanoi FC – Song Lam Nghe An rivalry (Vietnamese: Kình địch Hà Nội FC – Sông Lam Nghệ An) is a football rivalry between two Vietnamese football clubs, Hà Nội FC and Sông Lam Nghệ An (SLNA). This rivalry was considered one of the most notable rivalries in the V.League 1 around the 2010s.

== History ==
Hà Nội FC was formed in 2006 while Sông Lam Nghệ An was founded in 1979. In the domestic league, both teams were already well-known, SLNA for its extensive history and Hanoi for its expensive contracts with foreign players, giving the rivalry its nickname of 'Derby đồng tiền và lịch sử' (English: 'Derby of money and history').

There are a large amount of people from Nghe Tinh province living and working in Hanoi, the home province of SLNA. Fans show support with yellow clothing and flags carrying the sentence "Phủ vàng Hàng Đẫy" (English: Turn Hàng Đẫy yellow). They have faced each other 33 times.

== List of matches ==
Note: Bold represents the winning team

#	Date	Home team	Score	Away team	Tournament
1	10 May 2009	**Sông Lam Nghệ An**	2–1	T&T Hanoi	2009 V-League
2	16 August 2009	T&T Hanoi	1–1	Sông Lam Nghệ An	2009 V-League
3	18 April 2010	Hanoi T&T	0–0	Sông Lam Nghệ An	2010 V-League
4	1 August 2010	Sông Lam Nghệ An	0–0	Hanoi T&T	2010 V-League
5	9 January 2011	Hanoi T&T	2–2 (4–2 p )	Sông Lam Nghệ An	2010 Vietnamese Super Cup
6	5 April 2011	Hanoi T&T	0–0	Sông Lam Nghệ An	2011 V-League
7	21 August 2011	Sông Lam Nghệ An	1–1	Hanoi T&T	2011 V-League
8	15 January 2012	Sông Lam Nghệ An	2–2	Hanoi T&T	2012 V-League
9	14 May 2012	Hanoi T&T	2–6	**Sông Lam Nghệ An**	2012 V-League
10	7 April 2013	Hanoi T&T	2–2	Sông Lam Nghệ An	2013 V.League 1 (Note: From 2013, V.League has changed its name to V.League 1)
11	11 August 2013	Sông Lam Nghệ An	0–0	Hanoi T&T	2013 V.League 1
12	12 July 2014	Hanoi T&T	2–2	Sông Lam Nghệ An	2014 V.League 1
13	19 July 2014	Sông Lam Nghệ An	1–1	Hanoi T&T	2014 V.League 1
14	6 February 2015	**Sông Lam Nghệ An**	2–0	Hanoi T&T	2015 V.League 1
15	9 August 2015	**Hanoi T&T**	1–0	Sông Lam Nghệ An	2015 V.League 1
16	25 June 2016	Sông Lam Nghệ An	1–3	**Hanoi T&T**	2016 V.League 1
17	24 July 2016	**Hanoi T&T**	1–0	Sông Lam Nghệ An	2016 V.League 1
18	14 April 2017	**Hanoi FC (Note: From 2017, Hanoi T&T has changed its name to Hanoi FC)**	1–0	Sông Lam Nghệ An	2017 V.League 1
19	10 September 2017	Sông Lam Nghệ An	1–2	**Hanoi FC**	2017 V.League 1
20	May 30, 2018	Sông Lam Nghệ An	1–2	**Hanoi FC**	2018 V.League 1
21	9 September 2018	**Hanoi FC**	2–0	Sông Lam Nghệ An	2018 V.League 1
22	7 April 2019	**Hanoi FC**	4–0	Sông Lam Nghệ An	2019 V.League 1
23	19 September 2019	Sông Lam Nghệ An	0–1	**Hanoi FC**	2019 V.League 1
24	18 June 2020	Hanoi FC	0–1	**Sông Lam Nghệ An**	2020 V.League 1
25	31 July 2022	**Hanoi FC**	2–1	Sông Lam Nghệ An	2022 V.League 1
26	26 August 2022	Sông Lam Nghệ An	1–1	Hanoi FC	2022 V.League 1
27	2 July 2023	Hanoi FC	0–1	**Sông Lam Nghệ An**	2023 V.League 1
28	10 December 2023	**Hanoi FC**	2–0	Sông Lam Nghệ An	2023–24 V.League 1
29	4 May 2024	Sông Lam Nghệ An	1–1	Hanoi FC	2023–24 V.League 1
30	9 February 2025	**Hanoi FC**	3–0	Sông Lam Nghệ An	2024–25 V.League 1
31	10 May 2025	Sông Lam Nghệ An	1–2	**Hanoi FC**	2024–25 V.League 1
32	31 January 2026	Sông Lam Nghệ An	1–3	**Hanoi FC**	2025–26 V.League 1
33	13 March 2026	**Hanoi FC**	3–0	Sông Lam Nghệ An	2025–26 V.League 1
34	12 September 2026	Hanoi FC	1–4	**Sông Lam Nghệ An**	2026–27 V.League 1

== Honours ==
Hà Nội FC	Competition	Sông Lam Nghệ An
Domestic
6	V.League 1	3
3	Vietnamese National Cup	3
5	Vietnamese Super Cup	4
14	Aggregate	10
