= 2026–27 ASEAN Club Championship qualifying play-off round =

Southeast Asian football tournament

2026–27 ASEAN Club Championship qualifying play-off round was the play-off round of the 2026–27 ASEAN Club Championship, prior to the competition proper, began on 4 September and ended on 14 September.

A total of 4 teams competed in the qualifying play-off round. The two winners in the play-off round advanced to the group stage, to join the 12 teams that entered the group stage.

== Format ==
Each tie was played over two legs, with each team playing one leg at home. The team that scores more goals on aggregate over the two legs advances to the next round. If the aggregate score is level at the end of normal time of the second leg, extra time will be played, and if the same number of goals is scored by both teams during extra time, the tie will be determined by a penalty shoot-out.

== Teams ==
Below were the participating teams grouped by their starting play-off round.

Key to colours
Winners of the play-off round advanced to the group stage

Play-off round
No.	Team
1	(Philippines) Manila Digger
2	(Myanmar) Shan United
3	(Laos) Ezra
4	(Brunei) Kasuka

== Play-off round ==
The draw for the play-off round was held on 5 June 2026.

Pot 1	Pot 2
(Philippines) Manila Digger; (Myanmar) Shan United	(Laos) Ezra; (Brunei) Kasuka

=== Summary ===
The first leg was played on 4 and 11 September, and the second leg on 12 and 14 September 2026. The winners of the ties advanced to the group stage.

Play-off round
Team 1	Agg.	Team 2	1st leg	2nd leg
Manila Digger (Philippines)	9–2	(Brunei) Kasuka	5–1	4–1
Ezra (Laos)	3–3 (2–3 p)	(Myanmar) Shan United	3–2	0–1 (a.e.t.)

4 September 2026
19:00 UTC+8

Manila Digger (Philippines)	5–1	(Brunei) Kasuka
Touray 26' (pen.), 69'; Joof 45+2'; Ceesay 64'; Gomez 85'	Report	Taylor 51'

Rizal Memorial Stadium, Manila
Attendance: 962
Referee: Naufal Adya Fairuski (Indonesia)
12 September 2026
20:15 UTC+8

Kasuka (Brunei)	1–4	(Philippines) Manila Digger
E. Andrade 43'	Report	Ceesay 3', 11', 57'; C. Dabao 70'

Hassanal Bolkiah National Stadium, Bandar Seri Begawan
Attendance: 1,245
Referee: Hoàng Ngọc Hà (Vietnam)

Manila Digger won 9–2 on aggregate.

11 September 2026
18:00 UTC+6:30

Ezra (Laos)	3–2	(Myanmar) Shan United
Narita 45+2', 51'; Binly 77'	Report	Édson 21', 61' (pen.)

Thuwunna Stadium, Yangon (Myanmar)
Attendance: 235
Referee: Nazmi Nasaruddin (Malaysia)
14 September 2026
18:00 UTC+6:30

Shan United (Myanmar)	1–0 (a.e.t.)	(Laos) Ezra
Thet Wai Moe 90+4'	Report
Penalties
Kyaw Min Oo (penalty scored); Lwin Moe Aung (penalty missed); Sa Aung Pyae Ko (penalty scored); Thet Hein Soe (penalty missed); Édson (penalty scored)	3–2	(penalty missed) Phoutthavong; (penalty missed) Anantaza; (penalty scored) Narita; (penalty scored) Sudo; (penalty missed) R. Nakamura

Thuwunna Stadium, Yangon
Referee: Muhammad Zulfiqar (Singapore)

3–3 on aggregate. Shan United won 3–2 on penalties.
