= Lucão do Break =

Brazilian footballer (born 1991)

Personal information
- Full name: Lucas Vinícius Gonçalves Silva
- Date of birth: 14 September 1991 (age 35)
- Place of birth: Brasília, Brazil
- Height: 1.84 m (6 ft 0 in)
- Position: Striker

Team information
- Current team: Ninh Binh
- Number: 9

Youth career
- 2009–2010: Porto Alegre

Senior career*
Years	Team	Apps	(Gls)
2011	Shonan Bellmare	15	(2)
2012	Portimonense	12	(0)
2012	CSKA Sofia	0	(0)
2013	Sergipe	10	(2)
2013	Mogi Mirim	3	(1)
2014	Caxias	21	(3)
2015	Sergipe	7	(1)
2015	Resende	1	(0)
2015	São Bento	0	(0)
2016	Luverdense	0	(0)
2016	→ Sergipe (loan)	0	(0)
2016	Zimbru Chișinău	7	(0)
2017	Cruzeiro-RS	12	(3)
2017	América-RN	3	(2)
2017	Criciúma	27	(10)
2018	Goiás	45	(21)
2019	Al-Kuwait	2	(1)
2019	Fluminense	6	(0)
2020	Goiás	8	(2)
2020–2021	CRB	22	(9)
2021–2022	Guarani	44	(11)
2022–2023	Hanoi	24	(11)
2023	SHB Da Nang	6	(4)
2023–2025	Haiphong	47	(26)
2025–2026	The Cong–Viettel	25	(11)
2026–	Ninh Binh	4	(5)
- * Club domestic league appearances and goals as of 18 October 2026

Lucas Vinícius Gonçalves Silva (born 14 September 1991), commonly known as Lucão do Break or just Lucão, is a Brazilian professional footballer who plays as a striker for V.League 1 club Ninh Binh.

== Club career ==
Born in Brasília, Federal District, Lucão do Break started playing in Italy at the age of 15, but returned to Brazil after injuring his ankle. He subsequently finished his formation with Porto Alegre FC before joining Shonan Bellmare on 23 December 2010.

Lucão do Break made his senior debut on 29 June 2011, coming on as a second-half substitute for Daisuke Kikuchi in a 2–0 away loss against JEF United Chiba for the J2 League championship. His first goal came on 22 October, as he scored his team's seventh in a 7–1 home routing of FC Gifu.

On 25 February 2012, Lucão do Break was transferred to Segunda Liga side Portimonense. He contributed with 12 goalless appearances before playing in the 2012 U-20 Copa Libertadores on trial at Atlético Madrid.

Lucão do Break joined Sergipe ahead of the 2013 season, and finished the ensuing Campeonato Sergipano as the top goalscorer with ten goals as his side lifted the trophy. He subsequently represented Mogi Mirim, Caxias, another two stints at Sergipe, Resende and São Bento before moving abroad to FC Zimbru Chișinău in Moldova.

On 8 December 2016, eight days after being announced at CSE, Lucão joined Cruzeiro-RS. Following this on 8 May, he was presented at América de Natal in the Série D.

On 15 June 2017, Lucão do Break signed for Série B side Criciúma. He finished the season as the club's top goalscorer with ten goals.

On 20 December 2016, Lucão do Break agreed to a contract with fellow second division side Goiás, as his contract with Criciúma was due to expire.

=== Kuwait SC ===
In January 2019, Lucão do Break moved to Kuwait and signed with Kuwait SC for two years.

=== Hanoi FC ===
In August 2022, Lucão joined Hanoi FC for the remainder of the 2022 season. He was handed the number 7 jersey and finished the 2022 season with ten goals in 15 appearances. During Hanoi's first game under new manager Božidar Bandović, Lucão scored the opening goal as Hanoi FC beat Haiphong 2–0 to win the 2022 Vietnamese Super Cup.

=== SHB Da Nang ===
On 17 June 2023, fellow V.League 1 club SHB Da Nang announced the signing of Lucão. He debuted for SHB Da Nang on 24 June, as club captain, playing the full 90 minutes of a 0–0 draw with Haiphong FC, and scored his first goal in a 1–0 win over Cong An Ha Noi. On the final day of the season, Lucão scored his first V.League 1 hat-trick in a 3–1 win against Khanh Hoa.

=== Haiphong ===
On 19 August 2023, a photo was leaked of Lucão holding a Haiphong shirt at the Lạch Tray Stadium. He was officially confirmed as a Haiphong player on 30 August, with a two-year contract. He made his debut for the club on 5 October 2023, coming on as a substitute for Martin Lo in a 2–1 loss to Hougang United in the AFC Cup. Two weeks later on 20 October 2023, he scored a hat-trick against his old club Hanoi FC, winning 5–3. In the 2024–25 season, Lucão netted 14 goals and won the V.League 1 top scorer award alongside Alan Grafite.

=== The Cong–Viettel ===
On 24 June 2025, The Cong–Viettel announced the signing of Lucão to the team. He scored in his debut for the club in a 1–1 draw against Cong An Hanoi, as part of the 2025–26 V.League 1 opening game.

=== Ninh Binh ===
In July 2026, Lucão signed for league fellow Ninh Binh. He scored a hattrick on his debut for Ninh Binh, contributing in their 4–1 win over his former club Haiphong in the first matchday of the 2026–27 V.League 1.

== Career statistics ==
As of 18 October 2026

Appearances and goals by club, season and competition
Club	Season	League			State League		Cup		Continental		Other		Total	
Club	Season	Division	Apps	Goals	Apps	Goals	Apps	Goals	Apps	Goals	Apps	Goals	Apps	Goals
Shonan Bellmare	2011	J2 League	15	2	—		2	0	—		—		17	2
Portimonense	2011–12	Liga de Honra	12	0	—		—		—		—		12	0
Sergipe	2013	Série D	10	3	20	7	—		—		—		30	10
Mogi Mirim	2013	Série C	3	1	—		—		—		—		3	1
Caxias	2014	Série C	9	1	12	2	—		—		—		21	3
Sergipe	2015	Sergipano	—		7	1	—		—		—		7	1
Resende	2015	Série D	1	0	—		—		—		—		1	0
São Bento	2015	Paulista	—		—		—		—		4 (Note: Appearances in Copa Paulista)	1	4	1
Sergipe	2016	Série D	0	0	7	2	—		—		—		7	2
Zimbru Chișinău	2016–17	Moldovan National Division	7	0	—		—		—		—		7	0
Cruzeiro-RS	2017	Gaúcho	—		12	2	—		—		—		12	2
América-RN	2017	Série D	3	2	—		—		—		—		3	2
Criciúma	2017	Série B	27	10	—		—		—		—		27	10
Goiás	2018	Série B	16	10	11	5	4	0	—		—		31	15
Kuwait SC	2018–19	Kuwait Premier League	2	1	—		0	0	4 (Note: One appearance in AFC Champions League, three appearances in AFC Cup)	0	0	0	6	1
Fluminense	2019	Série A	6	0	0	0	0	0	—		—		6	0
Goiás	2020	Série A	1	0	5	2	1	0	1 (Note: Appearance in Copa Sudamericana)	0	—		8	2
CRB	2020	Série B	11	3	—		—		—		—		11	3
CRB	2021	Alagoano	—		10	4	2	1	—		9 (Note: Appearances in Copa do Nordeste)	2	21	7
CRB	Total		11	3	10	4	2	1	0	0	9	2	32	10
Guarani	2021	Série B	29	7	—		—		—		—		29	7
Guarani	2022	Série B	16	1	13	3	2	1	—		—		31	5
Guarani	Total		45	8	13	3	2	1	0	0	0	0	60	12
Hanoi FC	2022	V.League 1	13	8	—		2	2	—		—		15	10
Hanoi FC	2023	V.League 1	11	3	—		0	0	—		1 (Note: Appearance in Vietnamese Super Cup)	1	12	4
Hanoi FC	Total		24	11	0	0	2	2	0	0	1	1	27	14
SHB Da Nang	2023	V.League 1	6	4	—		—		—		—		6	4
Haiphong	2023–24	V.League 1	22	12	—		2	1	4 (Note: Appearances in AFC Cup)	1	—		28	14
Haiphong	2024–25	V.League 1	25	14	—		3	1	—		—		28	15
Haiphong	Total		47	26	0	0	5	2	4	1	0	0	56	29
The Cong–Viettel	2025–26	V.League 1	25	11	—		4	3	—		—		29	14
Ninh Binh	2026–27	V.League 1	4	5	—		0	0	—		—		4	5
Career total			274	98	97	28	22	9	9	1	14	4	416	140

== Honours ==
Sergipe

- Campeonato Sergipano: 2013, 2016

Hanoi FC

- V.League 1: 2022
- Vietnamese National Cup: 2022
- Vietnamese National Super Cup: 2022

Individual

- V.League 1 top scorer: 2024–25 (shared)
- V.League 1 Team of the Season: 2025–26
