= Cong An Hanoi FC–Hanoi FC rivalry =

Football match between Cong An Hanoi and Hanoi FC

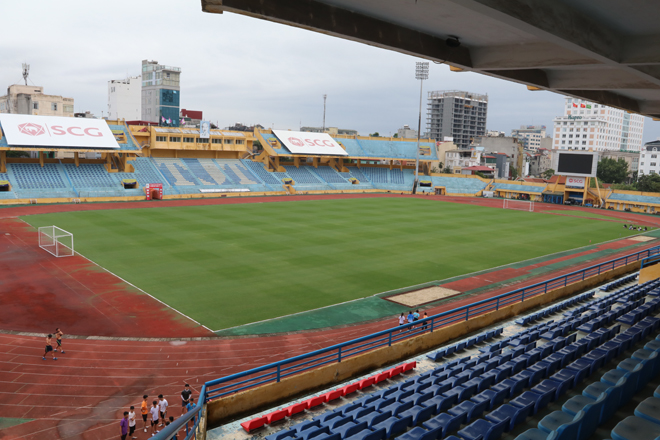
- Hàng Đẫy Stadium, where Cong An Hanoi FC–Hanoi FC rivalry matches are held.
- Native name: Derby Công An Ha Nội FC–Hà Nội FC; Derby thủ đô
- Other names: Capital derby
- Sport: Association football
- Location: Hanoi
- Teams: Cong An Hanoi; Hanoi FC
- First meeting: 7 April 2022; Vietnamese Cup; Hanoi FC 4–0 Cong An Nhan Dan
- Latest meeting: 18 October 2026; V.League 1 Cong An Hanoi 1–2 Hanoi FC
- Next meeting: February 2027; V.League 1 Hanoi FC v Cong An Hanoi
- Stadiums: Hàng Đẫy Stadium

Statistics
- Total meetings: 9
- Most wins: Hanoi FC (5)
- Most player appearances: Nguyễn Quang Hải (7)
- Top scorer: Nguyễn Văn Quyết (5)
- All-time series (V.League 1 only): CAHN: 3 Drawn: 1 Hanoi FC: 5
- Largest victory: Hanoi FC 4–0 CAND (2022)
- Largest goal scoring: CAHN 4–2 Hanoi FC (2025)
- Longest win streak: 2 games Cong An Hanoi (August–November 2023)
- Longest unbeaten streak: 3 games Hanoi FC (2024–2025)
- Current unbeaten streak: 2 games Hanoi FC (2026–present)

The Cong An Hanoi FC–Hanoi FC rivalry (Vietnamese: Derby Công An Ha Nội FC–Hà Nội FC), also known as Capital derby (Vietnamese: Derby thủ đô) refers to football matches between Cong An Hanoi and Hanoi FC in Hanoi, first contested in 2022. The matches play at Hàng Đẫy Stadium in Ô Chợ Dừa ward, Hanoi. The teams have played 9 matches in all competitions; CAHN winning 3, Hanoi FC 5 and the remaining 1 have been drawn. For their titles, they have won a combined 19 honours: 14 for Hanoi FC and 5 for Cong An Hanoi.

== History ==
Their first league meeting occurred on 9 February 2023, while Hanoi FC were doing their championship race to defend their title, and Cong An Hanoi were newly promoted from 2022 V.League 2, Hanoi FC won 2–0 against Cong An Hanoi. This results CAHN being placed 5th and Hanoi FC placed 2nd after the 2nd round. CAHN later won 2–1 against Hanoi FC on their 2nd meeting, securing their first place from the championship round table.

== Honours ==
=== Team honours ===
As of 17 May 2026

Team	League	National Cup	Super Cup	Total
Cong An Hanoi	3	1	1	5
Hanoi FC	6	3	5	14
Combined	9	4	6	19

== All-time results ==
As of 18 October 2026

Hanoi FC win
CAHN win
Draw

=== League ===
Hanoi FC vs Cong An Hanoi
Date	Score	Competition	Attendance
9 February 2023	2–0	V.League 1	14,000
16 June 2024	2–1	V.League 1	7,000
19 October 2024	1–1	V.League 1	8,000
8 March 2026	2–1	V.League 1	10,500

HNFC wins	Draws	CAHN wins
3	1	0

Cong An Hanoi vs Hanoi FC
Date	Score	Competition	Attendance
6 August 2023	2–1	V.League 1	14,000
3 November 2023	2–0	V.League 1	12,000
26 May 2025	0–2	V.League 1	9,000
28 August 2025	4–2	V.League 1	12,000
18 October 2026	1–2	V.League 1	9,000

CAHN wins	Draws	HNFC wins
3	0	2

==== Cup ====
Date	Venue	Score	Competition	Attendance
7 April 2022	Hàng Đẫy	4–0	Vietnamese Cup qualifying round	5,000

CAHN wins	Draws	HNFC wins
0	0	1

== Played for both teams ==
From Cong An Hanoi to Hanoi FC

- (Vietnam) Phạm Xuân Mạnh

From Hanoi FC to Cong An Hanoi

- (Vietnam) Nguyễn Hữu Sơn
- (Vietnam) Nguyễn Thành Chung
- (Vietnam) Trần Anh Đức
- (Vietnam) Nguyễn Như Tuấn
- (Vietnam) Đỗ Sỹ Huy
- (Vietnam) Trần Văn Đạt
- (Vietnam) Vũ Tiến Long
- (Vietnam) Bùi Tiến Dũng
- (Vietnam) Đoàn Văn Hậu
- (Vietnam) Huỳnh Tấn Sinh
- (Vietnam) Nguyễn Xuân Nam
- (Vietnam) Sầm Ngọc Đức
- (Brazil) Geovane Magno
- (Vietnam) Nguyễn Quang Hải
- (Vietnam) Bùi Hoàng Việt Anh
- (Vietnam) Nguyễn Văn Đức
