= Hoang Anh Gia Lai =

Hoang Anh Gia Lai may refer to:

- Hoang Anh Gia Lai Group, a Vietnamese company
- Hoang Anh Gia Lai FC, a football club in Vietnam
