= Damià Sabater =

Spanish footballer

Personal information
- Full name: Damià Sabater Tous
- Date of birth: 3 February 1996 (age 30)
- Place of birth: Palma, Spain
- Height: 1.77 m (5 ft 9 1/2 in)
- Position: Midfielder

Team information
- Current team: Cong An Hanoi
- Number: 14

Youth career
- –2002: Mallorca

Senior career*
Years	Team	Apps	(Gls)
2014–2015	Mallorca B	11	(0)
2015–2018	Mallorca	66	(1)
2017	→ Lugo (loan)	9	(0)
2018–2020	Espanyol B	45	(0)
2020–2021	La Nucía	8	(0)
2021	Pontevedra	17	(2)
2021–2022	Eldense	24	(1)
2022–2023	Racing Rioja	17	(1)
2023	Lleida	13	(1)
2023–2024	SD Logroñés	32	(1)
2024–2025	Inter Club d'Escaldes	24	(3)
2025–2026	Metaloglobus București	38	(1)
2026–	Cong An Hanoi	1	(0)

International career
2012	Spain U16	2	(0)
2012	Spain U17	1	(0)
- * Club domestic league appearances and goals as of 18 May 2026

Damià "Dami" Sabater Tous (born 3 February 1996) is a Spanish footballer who plays as a midfielder for V.League 1 club Cong An Hanoi.

== Club career ==
Born in Palma, Majorca, Balearic Islands, Damià graduated from local RCD Mallorca's youth system and made his senior debuts with the reserves in the 2014–15 campaign, in Segunda División B. On 7 June 2015 he made his first team debut, starting in a 0–2 away loss against CD Mirandés in the Segunda División championship.

On 12 August 2015 Damià signed a new four-year deal with the club, being definitely promoted to the main squad. He scored his first professional goal on 24 April of the following year, but in a 1–2 loss at CD Lugo.

On 31 January 2017, Damià was loaned to fellow second tier club Lugo until the end of the season. Upon returning, he featured regularly as his side achieved promotion from the third division.

On 30 July 2018, Damià signed for another reserve team, RCD Espanyol B, after terminating his contract with Mallorca.

== Career statistics ==
As of match played 18 May 2026

Appearances and goals by club, season and competition
Club	Season	League			National cup (Note: Includes Copa del Rey, Copa Constitució)		Other		Total	
Club	Season	Division	Apps	Goals	Apps	Goals	Apps	Goals	Apps	Goals
Mallorca B	2014–15	Segunda División B	11	0	—		—		11	0
Mallorca	2014–15	Segunda División	1	0	—		—		1	0
Mallorca	2015–16	Segunda División	31	1	1	0	—		32	1
Mallorca	2016–17	Segunda División	9	0	2	0	—		11	0
Mallorca	2017–18	Segunda División B	25	0	0	0	2 (Note: Appearances in Segunda División B promotion play-offs)	1	27	1
Mallorca	Total		66	1	3	0	2	1	71	2
Lugo (loan)	2016–17	Segunda División	9	0	—		—		9	0
Espanyol B	2018–19	Segunda División B	18	0	—		—		18	0
Espanyol B	2019–20	Segunda División B	27	0	—		—		27	0
Espanyol B	Total		45	0	—		—		45	0
La Nucía	2020–21	Segunda División B	8	0	2	0	—		10	0
Pontevedra	2020–21	Segunda División B	8	0	—		—		8	0
Eldense	2021–22	Segunda RFEF	24	1	1	0	2 (Note: Appearances in Segunda RFEF promotion play-offs)	0	27	1
Racing Rioja	2022–23	Segunda Federación	17	1	1	0	—		18	1
Lleida	2022–23	Segunda Federación	13	1	—		—		13	1
SD Logroñés	2023–24	Primera Federación	32	1	0	0	—		32	1
Inter Club d'Escaldes	2024–25	Primera Divisió	24	3	4	1	1 (Note: Appearance in Supercopa Andorrana)	0	29	4
Metaloglobus București	2025–26	Liga I	38	1	2	1	—		40	2
Cong An Hanoi	2026–27	V.League 1	0	0	0	0	0	0	0	0
Career total			295	9	13	2	5	1	313	12

== Honours ==
Mallorca

- Segunda División B: 2017–18

Inter Club d'Escaldes

- Primera Divisió: 2024–25
- Copa Constitució: 2025
- Andorran Supercup runner-up: 2024

Cong An Hanoi

- Vietnamese Super Cup: 2026
