= Hà Văn Phương =

Vietnamese footballer (born 2001)

Personal information
- Birth name: Hà Văn Phương
- Date of birth: 7 January 2001 (age 25)
- Place of birth: Phù Yên, Sơn La, Vietnam
- Height: 1.70 m (5 ft 7 in)
- Positions: Winger; left back

Team information
- Current team: Công An Hà Nội
- Number: 26

Youth career
- 2016–2020: Công An Nhân Dân

Senior career*
Years	Team	Apps	(Gls)
2020–	Công An Hà Nội	48	(3)

International career^{‡}
2023–2024	Vietnam U23	3	(0)
- * Club domestic league appearances and goals as of 22 June 2025 ‡ National team caps and goals as of 20 March 2024

Hà Văn Phương (born 7 January 2001) is a Vietnamese professional footballer who plays as a winger or left back for V.League 1 club Công An Hà Nội.

== Club career ==
Văn Phương was a youth product of the Công An Nhân Dân youth academy. After his good performances in the 2020 Vietnamese National U-19 Championship, he was promoted to Công An Nhân Dân first team in 2020. In the 2022 season, he was part of the Công An Nhân Dân team that won the V.League 2 title, making 12 appearances and scored 2 goals during the season.

In the 2023 season, Công An Nhân Dân changed its name into Công An Hà Nội and made several big signings, resulting Văn Phương being mostly unused during the season. He made 5 appearances and scored 1 goal during the season as his team ended up winning the V.League 1 title.

On 28 June 2025, Văn Phương renewed his club contract to 2028.

== International career ==
In March 2023, Văn Phương was named in the Vietnam U23 squad for the Doha Cup friendly tournament. He later featured in the preliminary squad for the 2023 SEA Games but was not named in the final list.

== Honours ==
Công An Hà Nội

- V.League 1: 2023, 2025–26
- V.League 2: 2022
- Vietnamese National Cup: 2024–25
- Vietnamese Super Cup: 2025, 2026
