= Phi-Long Tran =

French professional footballer (born 1997)

Personal information
- Full name: Phi-Long Karim Tran
- Date of birth: 26 March 2004 (age 22)
- Place of birth: Nogent-sur-Marne, France
- Height: 1.78 m (5 ft 10 in)
- Position: Winger

Team information
- Current team: Song Lam Nghe An
- Number: 10

Youth career
- –2021: Torcy
- 2021–2023: AC Ajaccio

Senior career*
Years	Team	Apps	(Gls)
2023–2024	Torcy B		
2024–2025	Stade Verviétois	23	(0)
2025–2026	United Richelle	13	(0)
2026–	Song Lam Nghe An	19	(0)
- * Club domestic league appearances and goals as of 20 November 2026

Phi-Long Karim Tran (born 26 March 2004) is a French professional footballer who plays as a winger for V.League 1 club Song Lam Nghe An.

== Career ==
Tran began his youth playing for local team US Torcy, before joining the youth academy of AC Ajaccio.

In August 2024, Tran signed for Belgian Division 2 club Stade Verviétois. He ended his contract with the team in March 2025 to play in the French Kings League.

In January 2026, Tran moved to Vietnam, signing for V.League 1 club Song Lam Nghe An. He had two assists for the team in the second leg of the 2025–26 V.League 1 season.

== Personal life ==
Tran was born to a French father of Vietnamese descent and an Algerian mother. His brother Abdel-Amine plays alongside him in Song Lam Nghe An.
