= 2026–27 ASEAN Club Championship group stage =

International football club competition in Southeast Asia

The 2026–27 ASEAN Club Championship group stage began on 7 August 2026 and will end on 1 April 2027. A total of 14 teams competed in the group stage to decide four places in the knockout stage of the 2026–27 ASEAN Club Championship.

Port, Kuching City, Persib, Công An Hồ Chí Minh City and Ratchaburi will make their debut appearance in the group stage.

== Draw ==
The draw for the group stage was held on 5 June 2026 in Jakarta, Indonesia. The 14 teams were drawn into two groups of seven.

Teams from the same association could not be drawn into the same group, with the exception of Thailand, where a maximum of two Thai teams (one being the title holder) could be placed in the same group. Due to political tensions between Thailand and Cambodia, teams from Cambodia and Thailand cannot be drawn against each other; if not possible, the title holder from Thailand or Cambodia cannot be drawn against another team from Cambodia or Thailand, and a Thai v Khmer matchup between non-title holders must be played in neutral venue and/or behind closed doors.

=== Teams and seeding ===
Below were the participating teams, grouped by their seeding pot. They included:

- 12 teams which entered in this stage
- 2 winners of the play-off round.

Key to colours
Group winners and runners-up advanced to quarter-finals

Pot 1
No.	Team
1	(Thailand) Buriram United
2	(Thailand) Port

Pot 2
No.	Team
3	(Thailand) Ratchaburi
4	(Malaysia) Johor Darul Ta'zim

Pot 3
No.	Team
5	(Malaysia) Kuching City
6	(Singapore) Lion City Sailors

Pot 4
No.	Team
7	(Singapore) Tampines Rovers
8	(Vietnam) Công An Hà Nội

Pot 5
No.	Team
9	(Vietnam) Công An Hồ Chí Minh City
10	(Cambodia) PKR Svay Rieng

Pot 6
No.	Team
11	(Indonesia) Borneo
12	(Indonesia) Persib Bandung

Pot 7 (Note: Identity of the two play-off winners was unknown at the time of the draw.)
No.	Team
13	(Philippines) Manila Digger
14	(Myanmar) Shan United

Notes

1. Title Holders (TH): ASEAN Club Championship title holders, automatically placed into Pot 1 as top seed.

== Format ==
The group stage is a single round-robin format.

The top four teams from each group advance to the quarter-finals.

=== Tiebreakers ===
The teams were ranked according to points (3 points for a win, 1 point for a draw, 0 points for a loss). If tied on points, tiebreakers were applied in the following order (Regulations Article 17.2):

1. Points in head-to-head matches among tied teams;
2. Goal difference in head-to-head matches among tied teams;
3. Goals scored in head-to-head matches among tied teams;
4. If more than two teams were tied, and after applying all head-to-head criteria above, a subset of teams were still tied, all head-to-head criteria above were reapplied exclusively to this subset of teams;
5. Goal difference in all group matches;
6. Goals scored in all group matches;
7. Penalty shoot-out if only two teams playing each other in the last round of the group are tied;
8. Disciplinary points (yellow card = 1 point, red card as a result of two yellow cards = 3 points, direct red card = 3 points, yellow card followed by direct red card = 4 points);
9. Drawing of lots.

== Groups ==
=== Group A ===
Pos	Team	Pld	W	D	L	GF	GA	GD	Pts	Qualification	TAM	CHC	BOR	KUC	RBM	BRU	MDF
1	(Singapore) Tampines Rovers	2	1	1	0	5	4	+1	4	Advance to knockout stage	—	9 Dec	—	—	3–2	—	24 Feb
2	(Vietnam) Công An Hồ Chí Minh City	2	1	1	0	2	1	+1	4	Advance to knockout stage	—	—	24 Feb	16 Dec	—	1–0	—
3	(Indonesia) Borneo	2	1	1	0	1	0	+1	4	Advance to knockout stage	3 Mar	—	—	—	16 Dec	—	1–0
4	(Malaysia) Kuching City	1	0	1	0	2	2	0	1	Advance to knockout stage	2–2	—	9 Dec	—	—	24 Feb	—
5	(Thailand) Ratchaburi	2	0	1	1	3	4	−1	1		—	1–1	—	31 Mar	—	—	9 Dec
6	(Thailand) Buriram United	2	0	1	1	0	1	−1	1		31 Mar	—	0–0	—	3 Mar	—	—
7	(Philippines) Manila Digger	1	0	0	1	0	1	−1	0		—	31 Mar	—	3 Mar	—	16 Dec	—

Updated to match(es) played on 18 November 2026. Source: ASEAN United
Rules for classification: Tiebreakers
7 October 2026
19:00 UTC+7

Buriram United (Thailand)	0–0	(Indonesia) Borneo
	Report

Chang Arena, Buriram
Attendance: 20,137
Referee: Majed Al-Shamrani (Saudi Arabia)
7 October 2026
19:00 UTC+7

Ratchaburi (Thailand)	1–1	(Vietnam) Công An Hồ Chí Minh City
Allardice 90+2'	Report	Olaha Mạnh Đức 48'

Ratchaburi Stadium, Ratchaburi
Attendance: 1,609
Referee: Mohamed Al-Harmoodi (United Arab Emirates)
7 October 2026
21:00 UTC+8

Kuching City (Malaysia)	2–2	(Singapore) Tampines Rovers
G. Peres 87', 90+3'	Report	Furusawa 13'; Kazama 88'

Taha Ariffin Stadium, Kuching
Attendance: 5,536
Referee: Omar Al-Yaqoubi (Oman)

18 November 2026
18:00 UTC+7

Công An Hồ Chí Minh City (Vietnam)	1–0	(Thailand) Buriram United
Nguyễn Thái Quốc Cường 88'	Report

Bình Dương Stadium, Ho Chi Minh City
Attendance: 7,168
Referee: Nazmi Nasaruddin (Malaysia)
18 November 2026
19:30 UTC+8

Tampines Rovers (Singapore)	3–2	(Thailand) Ratchaburi
Sumi 45+1'; Higashikawa 69'; Mahler 90+3'	Report	Insua 34'; R. Žulj 67' (pen.)

Jalan Besar Stadium, Kallang
Attendance: 858
Referee: Wong Wai Lun (Hong Kong)
18 November 2026
20:00 UTC+8

Borneo (Indonesia)	1–0	(Philippines) Manila Digger
Habib 79'	Report

Segiri Stadium, Samarinda
Attendance: 2,104
Referee: Qasim Al-Hatmi (Oman)

9 December 2026
19:30 UTC+8

Tampines Rovers (Singapore)	–	(Vietnam) Công An Hồ Chí Minh City
	Report

Bishan Stadium, Bishan
9 December 2026
19:00 UTC+7

Ratchaburi (Thailand)	–	(Philippines) Manila Digger
	Report

Ratchaburi Stadium, Ratchaburi
9 December 2026
21:00 UTC+8

Kuching City (Malaysia)	–	(Indonesia) Borneo
	Report

Taha Ariffin Stadium, Kuching

16 December 2026
19:00 UTC+8

Manila Digger (Philippines)	–	(Thailand) Buriram United
	Report

New Clark City Athletics Stadium, Capas
16 December 2026
20:00 UTC+8

Borneo (Indonesia)	–	(Thailand) Ratchaburi
	Report

Segiri Stadium, Samarinda
16 December 2026
19:30 UTC+7

Công An Hồ Chí Minh City (Vietnam)	–	(Malaysia) Kuching City
	Report

Bình Dương Stadium, Ho Chi Minh City

24 February 2027
19:30 UTC+8

Tampines Rovers (Singapore)	–	(Philippines) Manila Digger
	Report

Bishan Stadium, Bishan
24 February 2027
19:30 UTC+7

Công An Hồ Chí Minh City (Vietnam)	–	(Indonesia) Borneo
	Report

Bình Dương Stadium, Ho Chi Minh City
24 February 2027
21:00 UTC+8

Kuching City (Malaysia)	–	(Thailand) Buriram United
	Report

Taha Ariffin Stadium, Kuching

3 March 2027
19:00 UTC+8

Manila Digger (Philippines)	–	(Malaysia) Kuching City
	Report

New Clark City Athletics Stadium, Capas
3 March 2027
19:00 UTC+7

Buriram United (Thailand)	–	(Thailand) Ratchaburi
	Report

Chang Arena, Buriram
3 March 2027
20:00 UTC+8

Borneo (Indonesia)	–	(Singapore) Tampines Rovers
	Report

Segiri Stadium, Samarinda

31 March 2027
19:00 UTC+8

Manila Digger (Philippines)	–	(Vietnam) Công An Hồ Chí Minh City
	Report

New Clark City Athletics Stadium, Capas
31 March 2027
19:30 UTC+7

Buriram United (Thailand)	–	(Singapore) Tampines Rovers
	Report

Chang Arena, Buriram
31 March 2027
19:30 UTC+7

Ratchaburi (Thailand)	–	(Malaysia) Kuching City
	Report

Ratchaburi Stadium, Ratchaburi

=== Group B ===
Pos	Team	Pld	W	D	L	GF	GA	GD	Pts	Qualification	JDT	SIB	CAH	PKR	LCS	POR	SUN
1	(Malaysia) Johor Darul Ta'zim	2	2	0	0	9	1	+8	6	Advance to knockout stage	—	—	—	6–0	1 Apr	—	10 Dec
2	(Indonesia) Persib	2	2	0	0	9	1	+8	6	Advance to knockout stage	17 Dec	—	4 Mar	—	—	—	6–0
3	(Vietnam) Công An Hà Nội	2	1	0	1	2	3	−1	3	Advance to knockout stage	1–3	—	—	10 Dec	—	—	25 Feb
4	(Cambodia) PKR Svay Rieng	2	1	0	1	4	7	−3	3	Advance to knockout stage	—	25 Feb	—	—	17 Dec	4–1	—
5	(Singapore) Lion City Sailors	1	0	0	1	0	1	−1	0		—	10 Dec	0–1	—	—	25 Feb	—
6	(Thailand) Port	2	0	0	2	2	7	−5	0		4 Mar	1–3	1 Apr	—	—	—	—
7	(Myanmar) Shan United	1	0	0	1	0	6	−6	0		—	—	—	1 Apr	4 Mar	17 Dec	—

Updated to match(es) played on 19 November 2026. Source: ASEAN United
Rules for classification: Tiebreakers
8 October 2026
19:30 UTC+8

Lion City Sailors (Singapore)	0–1	(Vietnam) Công An Hà Nội
	Report	Léo Artur 45+2'

Jalan Besar Stadium, Jalan Besar
Attendance: 1,897
Referee: Hiroki Kasahara (Japan)
8 October 2026
19:00 UTC+7

Port (Thailand)	1–3	(Indonesia) Persib
Soonsup-Bell 66' (pen.)	Report	M. Peralta 87'; Berguinho 90+4'; Menalo 90+6'

Thammasat Stadium, Pathum Thani
Attendance: 1,729
Referee: Nazmi Nasaruddin (Malaysia)
8 October 2026
20:00 UTC+8

Johor Darul Ta'zim (Malaysia)	6–0	(Cambodia) PKR Svay Rieng
Arif 39'; Guilherme 51'; K. Medina 61'; Zahedi 70'; Amirruddin 78', 86'	Report

Sultan Ibrahim Stadium, Johor
Attendance: 15,451
Referee: Kim Woo-sung (South Korea)

19 November 2026
19:00 UTC+7

Persib (Indonesia)	6–0	(Myanmar) Shan United
Sekulić 12', 66'; Peralta 17' (pen.); Menalo 51'; Adam Alis 81'; Barros 86'	Report

Gelora Bandung Lautan Api Stadium, Bandung
Attendance: 11,186
Referee: Kim Woo-sung (South Korea)
19 November 2026
19:00 UTC+7

PKR Svay Rieng (Cambodia)	4–1	(Thailand) Port
Ratanak 14'; M. Júnior 43'; Alves 69'; Peprah 77' (pen.)	Report	Al-Sabhi 90+1'

Morodok Techo National Stadium, Phnom Penh
Attendance: 15,565
Referee: Yusuke Ohashi (Japan)
19 November 2026
19:30 UTC+7

Công An Hà Nội (Vietnam)	1–3	(Malaysia) Johor Darul Ta'zim
Nené 3' (o.g.)	Report	Arribas 50', 85'; Guilherme 60'

Hàng Đẫy Stadium, Hanoi
Attendance: 3,688
Referee: Rustam Lutfullin (Uzbekistan)

10 December 2026
19:30 UTC+8

Lion City Sailors (Singapore)	–	(Indonesia) Persib
	Report

Jalan Besar Stadium, Jalan Besar
10 December 2026
19:00 UTC+7

Johor Darul Ta'zim (Malaysia)	–	(Myanmar) Shan United
	Report

Sultan Ibrahim Stadium, Johor
10 December 2026
19:30 UTC+7

Công An Hà Nội (Vietnam)	–	(Cambodia) PKR Svay Rieng
	Report

Hàng Đẫy Stadium, Hanoi

17 December 2026
18:00 UTC+6:30

Shan United (Myanmar)	–	(Thailand) Port
	Report

Thuwunna Stadium, Yangon
17 December 2026
19:00 UTC+7

PKR Svay Rieng (Cambodia)	–	(Singapore) Lion City Sailors
	Report

Morodok Techo National Stadium, Phnom Penh
17 December 2026
19:00 UTC+7

Persib (Indonesia)	–	(Malaysia) Johor Darul Ta'zim
	Report

Gelora Bandung Lautan Api Stadium, Bandung

25 February 2027
19:30 UTC+8

Lion City Sailors (Singapore)	–	(Thailand) Port
	Report

Jalan Besar Stadium, Jalan Besar
25 February 2027
19:00 UTC+7

PKR Svay Rieng (Cambodia)	–	(Indonesia) Persib
	Report

Morodok Techo National Stadium, Phnom Penh
25 February 2027
19:30 UTC+7

Công An Hà Nội (Vietnam)	–	(Myanmar) Shan United
	Report

Hàng Đẫy Stadium, Hanoi

4 March 2027
18:00 UTC+6:30

Shan United (Myanmar)	–	(Singapore) Lion City Sailors
	Report

Thuwunna Stadium, Yangon
4 March 2027
19:00 UTC+7

Persib (Indonesia)	–	(Vietnam) Công An Hà Nội
	Report

Gelora Bandung Lautan Api Stadium, Bandung
4 March 2027
19:00 UTC+7

Port (Thailand)	–	(Malaysia) Johor Darul Ta'zim
	Report

Thammasat Stadium, Pathum Thani

1 April 2027
18:00 UTC+6:30

Shan United (Myanmar)	–	(Cambodia) PKR Svay Rieng
	Report

Thuwunna Stadium, Yangon
1 April 2027
19:30 UTC+7

Port (Thailand)	–	(Vietnam) Công An Hà Nội
	Report

Thammasat Stadium, Pathum Thani
1 April 2027
20:30 UTC+8

Johor Darul Ta'zim (Malaysia)	–	(Singapore) Lion City Sailors
	Report

Sultan Ibrahim Stadium, Johor
