= 2026–27 ASEAN Club Championship =

Fifth edition of the ASEAN Club Championship

2026–27 Shopee Cup
Tournament details
- Dates: Qualifying: 4–14 September 2026; Competition proper: 7 October 2026 – 30 June 2027
- Teams: Competition proper: 14; Total (maximum): 16 (from 10 associations)

Tournament statistics
- Matches played: 12
- Goals scored: 39 (3.25 per match)
- Attendance: 86,928 (7,244 per match)

The 2026–27 ASEAN Club Championship (2026–27 ACC), known as the 2026–27 Shopee Cup due to sponsorship reasons, is the fifth edition of the ASEAN Club Championship, an international football competition between clubs affiliated with the ASEAN Football Federation.

Buriram United are the two-time defending champions.

== Association team allocation ==
Clubs from all twelve member football associations of the ASEAN Football Federation were eligible to enter the competition; Australia and Timor-Leste did not.

Participation for 2026–27 ASEAN Club Championship
Participating
Not participating

Member association	Group stage	Play-off
Thailand	2 (+1 ACC)	—
Malaysia	2	—
Singapore	2	—
Vietnam	2	—
Indonesia	2	—
Cambodia	1	—
Philippines	—	1
Myanmar	—	1
Laos	—	1
Brunei	—	1
Australia	—	—
Timor-Leste	—	—
Total	12	4
Total	16	

Notes

Kuching City, Persib, Port, Công An Hồ Chí Minh City and Ratchaburi make a debut in competition this season.

== Teams ==
Group stage direct entrants
Team	Qualifying method	App. (last)
(Thailand) Buriram United	2025–26 ASEAN Club Championship title holder 2025–26 Thai League 1 champions	3rd (2025–26)
(Thailand) Port	2025–26 Thai League 1 runners-up 2025–26 Thai League Cup champions	1st
(Thailand) Ratchaburi	2025–26 Thai League 1 third place	1st
(Malaysia) Johor Darul Ta'zim	2025–26 Malaysia Super League champions	2nd (2025–26)
(Malaysia) Kuching City	2025–26 Malaysia Super League runners-up	1st
(Singapore) Lion City Sailors	2025–26 Singapore Premier League champions	3rd (2025–26)
(Singapore) Tampines Rovers	2025–26 Singapore Premier League runners-up	3rd (2025–26)
(Vietnam) Công An Hà Nội	2025–26 V.League 1 champions	3rd (2025–26)
(Vietnam) Công An Hồ Chí Minh City	2025–26 Vietnamese Cup champions	1st
(Indonesia) Persib	2025–26 Indonesia Super League champions	1st
(Indonesia) Borneo	2025–26 Indonesia Super League runners-up	2nd (2024–25)
(Cambodia) Preah Khan Reach Svay Rieng	2025–26 Cambodian Premier League champions	3rd (2025–26)

Qualifying play-off participants
Team	Qualifying method	App. (last)
(Philippines) Manila Digger	2025–26 Philippines Football League champions	1st
(Myanmar) Shan United	2025–26 Myanmar National League champions	3rd (2025–26)
(Laos) Ezra	2025–26 Lao League 1 champions	2nd (2025–26)
(Brunei) Kasuka	2025–26 Brunei Super League runners-up	3rd (2025–26)

Notes

1. ASEAN Club Championship (ACC): Since Buriram United wins (against Selangor), the spot reserved for the ASEAN Club Championship champions was transferred to the runners-up in the league.
2. Thailand (THA): Since Buriram United wins (against PT Prachuap), the spot reserved for the Thai FA Cup champions was transferred to the third-placed team in the league.

== Round and draw dates ==
At the draw on Friday, 5 June 2026 at RCTI studio in Jakarta, Indonesia at 10:00 UTC+7 (WIB), sixteen teams were drawn into two groups of seven. Teams from the same association were not placed in the same group, with the exception of Thailand, where a maximum of two Thai teams (one being the title holder) can be placed in the same group.

Schedule for 2026–27 ASEAN Club Championship
Stage	Round	Draw date	First leg	Second leg
Qualifying stage	Qualifying play-off	5 July 2026	4 and 11 September 2026	12 and 14 September 2026
Group stage	Matchday 1	5 July 2026	7–8 October 2026	
Group stage	Matchday 2	5 July 2026	18–19 November 2026	
Group stage	Matchday 3	5 July 2026	9–10 December 2026	
Group stage	Matchday 4	5 July 2026	16–17 December 2026	
Group stage	Matchday 5	5 July 2026	24–25 February 2027	
Group stage	Matchday 6	5 July 2026	3–4 March 2027	
Group stage	Matchday 7	5 July 2026	31 March – 1 April 2027	
Knockout stage	Quarter-finals	5 July 2026	19–20 May 2027	
Knockout stage	Semi-finals	5 July 2026	27 May 2027	3 June 2027
Knockout stage	Final	5 July 2026	17 June 2026	30 June 2026

== Qualifying play-offs ==
The first leg was played on 4 and 11 September, and the second leg on 12 and 14 September 2026. The winners of the ties advanced to the group stage.

Play-off round
Team 1	Agg.	Team 2	1st leg	2nd leg
Manila Digger (Philippines)	9–2	(Brunei) Kasuka	5–1	4–1
Ezra (Laos)	3–3 (2–3 p)	(Myanmar) Shan United	3–2	0–1 (a.e.t.)

== Group stage ==
At the draw on 5 July 2026 in Jakarta, Indonesia, fourteen teams were drawn into two groups of seven. Teams from the same association were not placed in the same group, with the exception of Thailand, where a maximum of two Thai teams (one being the title holder) can be placed in the same group. The group stage is a single round-robin format. Initially, the top four teams from each group advance to a quarter-final stage

Location of the 2026–27 ASEAN Club Championship group stage teams
Red: Group A; Yellow: Group B
Location of the 2026–27 ASEAN Club Championship group stage teams from Singapore

The group stage is a single round-robin format.

=== Group A ===
Pos	Team	Pld	W	D	L	GF	GA	GD	Pts	Qualification	TAM	CHC	BOR	KUC	RBM	BRU	MDF
1	(Singapore) Tampines Rovers	2	1	1	0	5	4	+1	4	Advance to knockout stage	—	9 Dec	—	—	3–2	—	24 Feb
2	(Vietnam) Công An Hồ Chí Minh City	2	1	1	0	2	1	+1	4	Advance to knockout stage	—	—	24 Feb	16 Dec	—	1–0	—
3	(Indonesia) Borneo	2	1	1	0	1	0	+1	4	Advance to knockout stage	3 Mar	—	—	—	16 Dec	—	1–0
4	(Malaysia) Kuching City	1	0	1	0	2	2	0	1	Advance to knockout stage	2–2	—	9 Dec	—	—	24 Feb	—
5	(Thailand) Ratchaburi	2	0	1	1	3	4	−1	1		—	1–1	—	31 Mar	—	—	9 Dec
6	(Thailand) Buriram United	2	0	1	1	0	1	−1	1		31 Mar	—	0–0	—	3 Mar	—	—
7	(Philippines) Manila Digger	1	0	0	1	0	1	−1	0		—	31 Mar	—	3 Mar	—	16 Dec	—

Updated to match(es) played on 18 November 2026. Source: ASEAN United
Rules for classification: Tiebreakers

=== Group B ===
Pos	Team	Pld	W	D	L	GF	GA	GD	Pts	Qualification	JDT	SIB	CAH	PKR	LCS	POR	SUN
1	(Malaysia) Johor Darul Ta'zim	2	2	0	0	9	1	+8	6	Advance to knockout stage	—	—	—	6–0	1 Apr	—	10 Dec
2	(Indonesia) Persib	2	2	0	0	9	1	+8	6	Advance to knockout stage	17 Dec	—	4 Mar	—	—	—	6–0
3	(Vietnam) Công An Hà Nội	2	1	0	1	2	3	−1	3	Advance to knockout stage	1–3	—	—	10 Dec	—	—	25 Feb
4	(Cambodia) PKR Svay Rieng	2	1	0	1	4	7	−3	3	Advance to knockout stage	—	25 Feb	—	—	17 Dec	4–1	—
5	(Singapore) Lion City Sailors	1	0	0	1	0	1	−1	0		—	10 Dec	0–1	—	—	25 Feb	—
6	(Thailand) Port	2	0	0	2	2	7	−5	0		4 Mar	1–3	1 Apr	—	—	—	—
7	(Myanmar) Shan United	1	0	0	1	0	6	−6	0		—	—	—	1 Apr	4 Mar	17 Dec	—

Updated to match(es) played on 19 November 2026. Source: ASEAN United
Rules for classification: Tiebreakers

== Top scorers ==
Team eliminated for this round / inactive for this round / Matches voided by AFF / Player left the team

Rank	Player	Team	MD1	MD2	MD3	MD4	MD5	MD6	MD7	QF	SF1	SF2	F1	F2	Total
1	(Brazil) Gabriel Peres	(Malaysia) Kuching City	2												2
1	(Malaysia) Daniesh Amirruddin	(Malaysia) Johor Darul Ta'zim	2												2
1	(Brazil) Marcos Guilherme	(Malaysia) Johor Darul Ta'zim	1	1											2
1	(Spain) Óscar Arribas	(Malaysia) Johor Darul Ta'zim		2											2
1	(Bosnia and Herzegovina) Luka Menalo	(Indonesia) Persib	1	1											2
1	(Montenegro) Balša Sekulić	(Indonesia) Persib		2											2
1	(Argentina) Mariano Peralta	(Indonesia) Persib	1	1											2

Note

- Goals scored in the qualifying play-offs and matches voided by AFF are not counted when determining top scorer

== See also ==
- 2027 CAFA Silk Way Cup
- 2027 SAFF Club Championship
- 2026–27 AGCFF Gulf Club Champions League
