= Luizão (footballer, born 2003) =

Brazilian footballer

Personal information
- Full name: Luiz Guilherme Vieira da Silva
- Date of birth: 19 February 2003 (age 23)
- Place of birth: Jaraguá do Sul, Brazil
- Height: 1.84 m (6 ft 0 in)
- Position: Forward

Team information
- Current team: Song Lam Nghe An
- Number: 77

Youth career
- Coritiba

Senior career*
Years	Team	Apps	(Gls)
2021–2022	Coritiba	10	(1)
2022	→ Tombense (loan)	0	(0)
2022–2025	Al Wasl	5	(0)
2024–2025	→ Dibba Al-Hisn (loan)	3	(0)
2025–2026	Brusque	15	(2)
2026	Botafogo-SP	7	(1)
2026–	Song Lam Nghe An	0	(0)
- * Club domestic league appearances and goals as of 16:08, 15 April 2026 (UTC)

Luiz Guilherme Vieira da Silva (born 19 February 2003), commonly known as Luizão, is a Brazilian professional footballer who plays as a forward for Botafogo-SP.

== Career ==
In August 2026, Luizão joined V.League 1 side Song Lam Nghe An.
