= 2026–27 Buriram United F.C. season =

Buriram United
2026–27 season
- Chairman: Newin Chidchob
- Head coach: (England) Mark Jackson (till 5 Sept 26) (Brazil) Emerson (till 8 Sept 26) (Portugal) Mário Silva (till 30 Oct 26) (Spain) Raúl Caneda
- Stadium: Chang Arena
Home colours	Away colours

The 2026–27 season is Buriram United's 15th season in the Thai League. (17th if including P.E.A.'s two seasons) The club will participate in the Thai League, Thai FA Cup, Thai League Cup, AFC Champions League Elite, and ASEAN Club Championship.

Buriram United, 2025–26 Thai League 1 champion, is supposed to kick off the season by competing in the Thailand Champions Cup against Port.

== Squad ==
As of 1 Oct 26

Squad No.	Name	Nationality	Date of birth (age)	Previous club
Goalkeepers
13	Neil Etheridge	(Philippines) (England)	7 February 1990 (age 36)	(England) Birmingham City
29	Korraphat Nareechan	(Thailand)	7 October 1997 (age 29)	(Thailand) Lamphun Warriors
34	Chatchai Budprom	(Thailand)	4 February 1987 (age 39)	(Thailand) PT Prachuap
45	Prapot Chongcharoen	(Thailand)	4 January 2004 (age 22)	Youth team
Defenders
3	Pansa Hemviboon	(Thailand)	8 July 1990 (age 36)	(Thailand) Khon Kaen United
5	Nathan Pelae	(Brazil)	13 May 1995 (age 31)	(Brazil) América Mineiro
6	Curtis Good (Note: Curtis Good registered for ACL Elite and Shopee Cup only)	(Australia)	23 March 1993 (age 33)	(Australia) Melbourne City
15	Narubadin Weerawatnodom	(Thailand)	12 July 1994 (age 32)	(Thailand) BEC Tero Sasana F.C.
16	Kenny Dougall (captain)	(Thailand) (Australia)	7 May 1993 (age 33)	(England) Blackpool
17	Lucas Ahijado	(Spain)	30 January 1995 (age 31)	(Spain) Oviedo
22	Marc Navarro (Note: Marc Navarro was initially registered for the Thai League but now only ACL Elite as he was de-registered for the Thai League before the window closed.)	(Spain)	2 July 1995 (age 31)	(Poland) Arka Gdynia
26	Uroš Radaković	(Serbia)	31 March 1994 (age 32)	(France) FC Nantes
31	Caju (Note: Caju registered for ACL Elite only as he is signed after transfer window closed.)	(Brazil)	17 July 1995 (age 31)	(Serbia) Spartak Subotica
39	Jakkapan Praisuwan	(Thailand)	16 August 1994 (age 32)	(Thailand) Bangkok United
40	Eduardo Mancha (Note: Eduardo Mancha registered for ACL Elite only as he is signed after transfer window closed.)	(Brazil)	24 November 1995 (age 30)	(Japan) Ventforet Kofu
59	Noppadon Haophrab	(Thailand)		Youth team
62	Anapol Kulsiri	(Thailand)		Youth team
68	Bordin Srakaew	(Thailand)	10 January 2001 (age 25)	Youth team
75	Shinnaphat Leeaoh	(Thailand)	2 February 1997 (age 29)	(Thailand) Ratchaburi
78	Supanat Mahawai	(Thailand)	12 April 2007 (age 19)	(Thailand) Surin
Midfielders
2	Sasalak Haiprakhon	(Thailand)	8 January 1996 (age 30)	(Thailand) Bangkok United
10	Sebas Moyano (Note: Sebas Moyano was initially registered for the Thai League but now only ACL Elite as he was de-registered for the Thai League before the window closed.)	(Spain)	23 March 1997 (age 29)	(Spain) Real Zaragoza
18	Vukan Savićević (Note: Vukan Savićević registered for ACL Elite only as he is signed after transfer window closed.)	(Montenegro)	29 January 1994 (age 32)	(Serbia) FK Vojvodina
19	Kingsley Schindler (Note: Kingsley Schindler was initially registered for ACL Elite only but also registered for the Thai League before the window closed.)	(Ghana) (Germany)	7 December 1993 (age 32)	(Turkey) Samsunspor
20	Toni Moya (Note: Toni Moya registered for ACC only as he is signed after transfer window closed.)	(Spain)	20 March 1998 (age 28)	(Spain) Real Zaragoza
23	Goran Čaušić	(Serbia)	5 May 1992 (age 34)	(Russia) FC Arsenal Tula
25	Yassine Benzia	(Algeria) (France)	8 September 1994 (age 32)	(Saudi Arabia) Al-Fayha
27	Phitiwat Sukjitthammakul	(Thailand)	1 February 1995 (age 31)	(Thailand) BG Pathum United
33	Thanakrit Chotmuangpak	(Thailand)	1 September 2006 (age 20)	Youth team
37	Darlan (Note: Darlan registered for ACL Elite only as he is signed after transfer window closed.)	(Brazil)	16 April 1998 (age 28)	(Portugal) Santa Clara
55	Theerathon Bunmathan	(Thailand)	6 February 1990 (age 36)	(Japan) Yokohama F. Marinos
64	Jetsadakorn Pararak	(Thailand)		Youth team
72	Sorawit Srilang	(Thailand)		Youth team
74	Kiattisak Hansena	(Thailand)	20 April 2001 (age 25)	Youth team
75	Supradit Wongsaprom	(Thailand)	9 June 2001 (age 25)	Youth team
80	Phanuphong Jeyakom	(Thailand)	18 June 2009 (age 17)	Youth team
81	Ratchanon Khodchasamee	(Thailand)		Youth team
88	Dutsadee Buranajutanon	(Thailand)	7 March 2006 (age 20)	(Thailand) Surin
96	Natpakhan Promthongmee	(Thailand)	28 November 2005 (age 20)	Youth team
	Thanyakon Swangsuk	(Thailand)	29 May 2007 (age 19)	Youth team
Forwards
4	Reza Asadi	(Iran)	17 January 1996 (age 30)	(Iran) Gol Gohar
7	Guilherme Bissoli	(Brazil)	9 January 1998 (age 28)	(Brazil) Ceará
8	Paulo Henrique	(Brazil)	10 July 1994 (age 32)	(United Arab Emirates) Al Bataeh Club
9	Supachai Chaided	(Thailand)	1 December 1998 (age 27)	(Thailand) Super Power Samut Prakan
11	Anan Yodsangwal	(Thailand)	9 July 2001 (age 25)	(Thailand) Lamphun Warriors
21	Iklas Sanron	(Thailand)	16 December 2004 (age 21)	(Thailand) PT Prachuap
30	Stefan Schimmer (Note: Stefan Schimmer was initially registered for ACL Elite only but also registered for the Thai League before the window closed.)	(Germany)	28 April 1994 (age 32)	(Germany) Heidenheim
49	Panuwit Jayakom	(Thailand)		Youth team
54	Nathakorn Rattanasuwan	(Thailand)	5 December 2007 (age 18)	Youth team
69	Phonphithak Rungrueang	(Thailand)	14 September 2009 (age 17)	Youth team
83	Thanat Kaewglan	(Thailand)		Youth team
90	Phanuwit Jeyakom	(Thailand)	18 June 2009 (age 17)	Youth team
99	Alexandru Tudorie (Note: Alexandru Tudorie was initially registered for the Thai League but now only ACL Elite as he was de-registered for the Thai League before the window closed.)	(Romania)	19 March 1996 (age 30)	(China) Guangdong GZ-Power
	Sakdinon Bunlua	(Thailand)	12 January 2001 (age 25)	Youth team
Players loaned out during season
24	Elias Dolah	(Thailand) (Sweden)	24 April 1993 (age 33)	(Thailand) BG Pathum United
28	Maxx Creevey	(Thailand) (Australia)	28 April 1995 (age 31)	(Thailand) Rayong
35	Kittipong Bunmak (G)	(Thailand)	22 March 2005 (age 21)	(Thailand) Bankhai United
50	Singha Marasa (D)	(Thailand)	19 August 2006 (age 20)	(Thailand) Pattaya United
55	Juan Ibiza	(Spain)	17 August 1995 (age 31)	(Poland) Widzew Łódź
63	Jhetsaphat Khuantanom	(Thailand)	28 January 2005 (age 21)	(Thailand) Kanchanaburi Power
70	Jirapong Pungviravong (F)	(Thailand)	20 September 2006 (age 20)	(Thailand) Surin
89	Pongsakron Hanrattana	(Thailand)	21 April 2003 (age 23)	(Thailand) Nakhon Ratchasima
90	Panuphong Wongpila (F)	(Thailand)	15 February 2003 (age 23)	(Thailand) Phrae United
91	Phumin William Boers (D)	(Thailand) (Netherlands)	15 January 2003 (age 23)	(Thailand) Sisaket United (T2)
92	Thanison Paibulkijcharoen	(Thailand)	19 February 2002 (age 24)	(Thailand) Uthai Thani
95	Seksan Ratree	(Thailand)	14 March 2003 (age 23)	(Thailand) Rayong
98	Anut Samran (G)	(Thailand)	16 March 2006 (age 20)	(Thailand) Marines
	Pikanet Laohawiwat (D)	(Thailand)	4 March 2005 (age 21)	(Thailand) North Bangkok University
	Pakawat Taengoakson (D)	(Thailand)	28 February 2005 (age 21)	(Thailand) MH Nakhon Si City
48	Wanthayawut Nuchkasae (D)	(Thailand)	25 September 2005 (age 21)	(Thailand) Sisaket United (T2)
	Paripan Wongsa (M)	(Thailand)	19 March 2005 (age 21)	(Thailand) Samui United
	Phumeworapol Wannabutr (M)	(Thailand)	14 October 2004 (age 22)	(Thailand) Rasisalai United
	Rattapoom Pankejohn (M)	(Thailand)	26 May 2006 (age 20)	(Thailand) Samui United
	Natapakhan Promthongmee (M)	(Thailand)	28 November 2005 (age 20)	(Thailand) Roi Et PB United
	Sakdisek Kosol (M)	(Thailand)	23 July 2004 (age 22)	(Thailand) Bankhai United
	Piyawat Petra (F)	(Thailand)	15 March 2005 (age 21)	(Thailand) Pattaya United
	Winai Aimaot (F)	(Thailand)	28 January 2003 (age 23)	(Thailand) Phichit United
	Chanothai Kongmeng (F)	(Thailand)	7 March 2006 (age 20)	(Thailand) Surin
Players left during season
32	Robert Žulj	(Austria) (Croatia)	5 February 1992 (age 34)	(Austria) LASK
44	Peter Žulj	(Austria) (Croatia)	9 June 1993 (age 33)	(China) Changchun Yatai

== Management and staff ==
Position	Name
President	(Thailand) Newin Chidchob
Team Manager	(Thailand) Boriphat Soonrod
Head coach	(England) Mark Jackson (till 5 Sept) (Portugal) Mário Silva (from 8 Sept)
Assistant coach	(Wales) Cameron Toshack (till 5 Sept) (Australia) Lucas Vileva (till 5 Sept) (Brazil) Emerson Pereira (Portugal) Eurico Pinhal (from 8 Sept)
Goalkeeper coach	(Serbia) Zoran Mijanovic
Physical & Fitness coach	(England) Rob Morledge (Serbia) Marko Prentovic (Brazil) Juliano Vallim (Brazil) Willander Fonseca (Australia) David Kist
Team analyst	(Australia) Jordan Manning (France) Thomas Richard
Physiotherapists	(Brazil) Jose Antônio Lera
Manager of Academy Team	(Thailand) Siwarak Tedsungnoen (Thailand) Chitipat Tanklang

== Transfer ==
=== In ===
Pre-season transfer

Date	Position	Player	Transferred from	Fee	Ref
First team
31 May 2026	FW	(Singapore) (South Africa) Ilhan Fandi	(Thailand) BG Pathum United	Season loan	
31 May 2026	MF	(Thailand) (England) Leon James	(Thailand) Nakhon Ratchasima	End of loan	
31 May 2026	DF	(Thailand) (Sweden) Elias Dolah	(Thailand) BG Pathum United	End of loan	
31 May 2026	DF	(Thailand) Seksan Ratree	(Thailand) Rayong	End of loan	
31 May 2026	DF	(Thailand) (Australia) Maxx Creevey	(Thailand) Rayong	End of loan	
31 May 2026	FW	(Thailand) (Norway) Athit Berg	(Thailand) Port	End of loan	
6 July 2026	DF	(Brazil) Caju	(Serbia) Spartak Subotica	Free	
6 July 2026	DF	(Brazil) Nathan Pelae	(Brazil) América Mineiro	Free	
6 July 2026	DF	(Thailand) Jakkapan Praisuwan	(Thailand) Bangkok United	Free	
6 July 2026	FW	(Thailand) Anan Yodsangwal	(Thailand) Lamphun Warriors	Free	
6 July 2026	FW	(Thailand) Iklas Sanron	(Thailand) PT Prachuap	Free	
7 July 2026	DF	(Serbia) Uroš Radaković	(France) FC Nantes	Free	
7 July 2026	MF	(Brazil) Darlan	(Portugal) Santa Clara	Free	
7 July 2026	MF	(Montenegro) Vukan Savićević	(Serbia) FK Vojvodina	Free	
7 July 2026	FW	(Brazil) Paulo Henrique	(United Arab Emirates) Al Bataeh Club	Free	
7 July 2026	FW	(Spain) Sebas Moyano	(Spain) Real Zaragoza	Free	
7 July 2026	FW	(Germany) Stefan Schimmer	(Germany) Heidenheim	Free	
12 July 2026	DF	(Spain) Marc Navarro	(Poland) Arka Gdynia	Free	
22 August 2026	FW	(Romania) Alexandru Tudorie	(China) Guangdong GZ-Power	Free	
30 September 2026	MF	(Spain) Toni Moya	(Spain) Real Zaragoza	Free	
5 October 2026	DF	(Spain) Lucas Ahijado	(Spain) Oviedo	Free	
31 October 2026	FW	(Iran) Reza Asadi	(Iran) Gol Gohar	Free	
15 November 2026	MF	(Algeria) (France) Yassine Benzia	(Saudi Arabia) Al-Fayha	Free	
Academy
31 May 2026	GK	(Thailand) Chayot Junsuy	(Thailand) PT Satun (T3)	End of loan	
31 May 2026	GK	(Thailand) Nopphon Lakhonphon	(Thailand) Nakhon Ratchasima	End of loan	
31 May 2026	GK	(Thailand) Phumeworapol Wannabutr	(Thailand) Rasisalai United (T2)	End of loan	
31 May 2026	GK	(Thailand) Anut Samran	(Thailand) Marines (T3)	End of loan	
31 May 2026	GK	(Thailand) Kittipong Bunmak	(Thailand) Bankhai United (T3)	End of loan	
31 May 2026	DF	(Thailand) Singha Marasa	(Thailand) Pattaya United (T2)	End of loan	
31 May 2026	DF	(Thailand) Pongsakron Hanrattana	(Thailand) Nakhon Ratchasima	End of loan	
31 May 2026	DF	(Thailand) Wanthayawut Nuchkasae	(Thailand) Sisaket United (T2)	End of loan	
31 May 2026	DF	(Thailand) (Netherlands) Phumin William Boers	(Thailand) Sisaket United (T2)	End of loan	
31 May 2026	DF	(Thailand) Chotika Mueanta	(Thailand) Rasisalai United (T2)	End of loan	
31 May 2026	DF	(Thailand) Thanison Paibulkijcharoen	(Thailand) Uthai Thani	End of loan	
31 May 2026	DF	(Thailand) Pakawat Taengoakson	(Thailand) Samui United (T3)	End of loan	
31 May 2026	DF	(Thailand) Pikanet Laohawiwat	(Thailand) Roi Et PB United (T3)	End of loan	
31 May 2026	MF	(Thailand) Natapakhan Promthongmee	(Thailand) Roi Et PB United (T3)	End of loan	
31 May 2026	MF	(Thailand) Sakdisek Kosol	(Thailand) Bankhai United (T3)	End of loan	
31 May 2026	MF	(Thailand) Dutsadee Buranajutanon	(Thailand) Samui United (T3)	End of loan	
31 May 2026	MF	(Thailand) Rattapoom Pankejohn	(Thailand) Samui United (T3)	End of loan	
31 May 2026	MF	(Thailand) Supanat Mahawai	(Thailand) Surin (T3)	End of loan	
31 May 2026	MF	(Thailand) Jirapong Pungviravong	(Thailand) Surin (T3)	End of loan	
31 May 2026	FW	(Thailand) Chanothai Kongmeng	(Thailand) Surin (T3)	End of loan	
31 May 2026	FW	(Thailand) Paripan Wongsa	(Thailand) Samui United (T3)	End of loan	
31 May 2026	FW	(Thailand) Piyawat Petra	(Thailand) Pattaya United (T2)	End of loan	
31 May 2026	FW	(Thailand) Panuphong Wongpila	(Thailand) Phrae United (T2)	End of loan	
31 May 2026	FW	(Thailand) Winai Aimaot	(Thailand) Phichit United (T2)	End of loan	

=== Out ===
Preseason

Date	Position	Player	Transferred To	Fee	Ref
First team
30 January 2026	DF	(Spain) Juan Ibiza	(South Korea) Incheon United (K1)	Season loan till June-27	
9 June 2026	MF	(Thailand) (England) Leon James	(Thailand) BG Pathum United	Free	
30 June 2026	FW	(Singapore) (South Africa) Ilhan Fandi	(Thailand) BG Pathum United	End of loan	
12 June 2026	DF	(Thailand) Seksan Ratree	(Thailand) Port	Season loan	
16 June 2026	MF	(Thailand) Ratthanakorn Maikami	(Thailand) Uthai Thani	Free	
27 June 2026	MF	(Thailand) Suphanat Mueanta	(Japan) RB Omiya Ardija	Undisclosed	
1 July 2026	DF	(Montenegro) Filip Stojković	(Thailand)	Free	
1 July 2026	FW	(Thailand) Pathompol Charoenrattanapirom	(Thailand) Ayutthaya United	Free	
1 July 2026	FW	(Thailand) (Norway) Athit Berg	(Thailand) Lamphun Warriors	Free	
2 July 2026	GK	(Thailand) Nopphon Lakhonphon	(Thailand) Ratchaburi	Free	
2 July 2026	DF	(Indonesia) (Netherlands) Sandy Walsh	(Indonesia) Persib Bandung	Undisclosed	
11 July 2026	DF	(Thailand) (Australia) Maxx Creevey	(Thailand) Chanthaburi (T2)	Season loan	
20 July 2026	DF	(Thailand) (Sweden) Elias Dolah	(Thailand) BG Pathum United	Season loan	
20 July 2026	FW	(Denmark) Kasper Junker	(Denmark) Randers FC	Free	
23 July 2026	FW	(Ghana) Emmanuel Toku	(Belgium)	Free	
29 July 2026	DF	(South Korea) Ko Myeong-seok	(Indonesia) Dewa United	Free	
1 September 2026	MF	(Austria) Peter Žulj	(Thailand) Ratchaburi	Free	
1 September 2026	FW	(Spain) Rubén Sánchez	(Spain)	Free	
16 September 2026	MF	(Austria) Robert Žulj	(Thailand) Ratchaburi	Season loan	
Academy
23 June 2026	GK	(Thailand) Kittipong Bunmak	(Thailand) PT Satun (T2)	Season loan	
23 June 2026	DF	(Thailand) Jhetsaphat Khuantanom	(Thailand) PT Satun (T2)	Season loan	
23 June 2026	FW	(Thailand) Panuphong Wongpila	(Thailand) PT Satun (T2)	Season loan	
5 July 2026	DF	(Thailand) Thanison Paibulkijcharoen	(Thailand) Sisaket United	Season loan	
8 July 2026	DF	(Thailand) Pongsakron Hanrattana	(Thailand) Sisaket United	Season loan	
11 July 2026	DF	(Thailand) Chotika Mueanta	(Thailand) Rasisalai United	Free	
16 July 2026	FW	(Thailand) Paripan Wongsa	(Thailand) Rasisalai United	Season loan	
16 July 2026	FW	(Thailand) Piyawat Petra	(Thailand) Rasisalai United	Season loan	
18 July 2026	GK	(Thailand) Phumeworapol Wannabutr	(Thailand) Lamphun Warrior	Season loan	
22 July 2026	GK	(Thailand) Anut Samran	(Thailand) Nakhon Si United (T2)	Season loan	
22 July 2026	DF	(Thailand) Wanthayawut Nuchkasae	(Thailand) Samui United (T3)	Season loan	
22 July 2026	MF	(Thailand) Natapakhan Promthongmee	(Thailand) Samui United (T3)	Season loan	
22 July 2026	MF	(Thailand) Jirapong Pungviravong	(Thailand) Pattaya United (T2)	Season loan	
22 July 2026	FW	(Thailand) Chanothai Kongmeng	(Thailand) Pattaya United (T2)	Season loan	
22 July 2026	FW	(Thailand) Winai Aimaot	(Thailand) Uttaradit (T2)	Season loan	
29 July 2026	DF	(Thailand) (Netherlands) Phumin William Boers	(Thailand) Muang Loei United (T2)	Season loan	
29 July 2026	MF	(Thailand) Rattapoom Pankejohn	(Thailand) Muang Loei United (T2)	Season loan	
4 September 2026	DF	(Thailand) Chaiyasit Popoon	(Thailand) Phrae United (T2)	Season loan	

=== Extension and retained ===
Position	Player	Ref
GK	(Philippines) (England) Neil Etheridge	2-years contract signed 3 Oct 26 till June 2028
MF	(Serbia) Goran Čaušić	2-years contract signed 3 Oct 26 till June 2028

== Friendlies ==
=== Pre-Season Friendly ===
Win Draw Loss

26 July 2026 1	BG Pathum United (Thailand)	0-3	(Thailand) Buriram United	Pathum Thani
		Report	Guilherme Bissoli 10', 25'; Supachai Chaided 15'	Stadium: True BG Stadium

1 August 2026 2	Pattani (Thailand)	0-1	(Thailand) Buriram United	Pattani
			Vukan Savicević 89'	Stadium: Pattani Province Stadium

8 August 2026 3	Nakhon Pathom United (Thailand)	0-2	(Thailand) Buriram United	Nakhon Pathom
			Robert Žulj 17'; Thanakrit Chotmuangpak 51'	Stadium: Nakhon Pathom Municipality Sport School Stadium

9 August 2026 4	Ratchaburi (Thailand)	0-2	(Thailand) Buriram United	Ratchaburi
			Guilherme Bissoli 35'; Darlan 74'	Stadium: Dragon Solar Park

16 August 2026 5	Buriram United (Thailand)	5-0	(Thailand) Rasisalai United	Buriram
	5' (o.g.); Caju 25'; Sebas Moyano 33'; Guilherme Bissoli 65'; Goran Causic 82'			Stadium: Chang Arena

19 August 2026 6	Chonburi (Thailand)	cancelled	(Thailand) Buriram United	Chonburi
				Stadium: Chonburi Stadium

23 August 2026 7	Ayutthaya United (Thailand)	0-3	(Thailand) Buriram United	Ayutthaya
			Kingsley Schindler 45+3'; Guilherme Bissoli 49'; Marc Navarro 75'	Stadium: Ayutthaya Province Stadium

28 August 2026 8	Buriram United (Thailand)	3-3	(Thailand) Sisaket United	Buriram
	Alexandru Tudorie 2'; Sebas Moyano 11'; Vukan Savićević 49'			Stadium: Chang Arena

29 August 2026 9	Buriram United (Thailand)	2-1	(Thailand) Port	Buriram
	Kenny Dougall 25'; Nathan Neale 85'		Matheus Lins 14'	Stadium: Chang Arena

== Competitions ==
=== Overview ===
Competition	First match	Last match	Starting round	Record							
Competition	First match	Last match	Starting round	Pld	W	D	L	GF	GA	GD	Win %
Thai League 1	6 September 2026		Matchday 1	7	5	1	1	13	8	+5	71.43
Thai FA Cup	21 October 2026		First round	1	1	0	0	8	0	+8	100.00
Thai League Cup				0	0	0	0	0	0	+0	—
AFC Champions League Elite	15 September 2026		League stage	4	0	3	1	2	3	−1	0.00
ASEAN Club Championship	7 October 2026		Group stage	2	0	1	1	0	1	−1	0.00
Total				14	6	5	3	23	12	+11	42.86

Last updated: 18 November 2026
Source: Competitions

=== Thai League 1 ===
==== Matches ====
Win Draw Loss

6 September 2026 1	Sukhothai	1–3	Buriram United	Sukhothai
	Nathan Palafoz 78'; Rhuan (yellow card) 80'; Luan Rodrigues (yellow card) 88'		Guilherme Bissoli 14' (pen.), 40', 45+2'; Phitiwat Sukjitthammakul (yellow card) 75'; Jakkaphan Praisuwan (yellow card) 75'	Stadium: Thalay Luang Stadium; Attendance: 6,106; Referee: Pawaran Seejen

11 September 2026 2	Buriram United	1–1	Chiangrai United	Buriram
	Guilherme Bissoli 32'; Shinnaphat Leeaoh (yellow card) 43'		Robinho 77'; Hélio Batista (yellow card) 38'; Thawatchai Inprakhon (yellow card) 48'; Zé Ricardo (yellow card) 90+3'	Stadium: Chang Arena; Attendance: 20,385; Referee: Peerasan Krataithong

20 September 2026 3	Chonburi	0–1	Buriram United	Chonburi
	Jorge Fellipe (yellow card) 23'; Saharat Sontisawat (yellow card) 26'; Yotsakon Burapha (yellow card) 63'		Saharat Sontisawat 8' (o.g.); Guilherme Bissoli (yellow card) 73'; Kenny Dougall (yellow card) 86'	Stadium: Chonburi Stadium; Attendance: 8,463; Referee: Pawara Seejen

10 October 2026 4	Buriram United	3–2	Rayong	Buriram
	Stefan Schimmer 45'; Supachai Chaided 82'; Thanakrit Chotmuangpak 90+4'; Sebas Moyano (yellow card) 26'; Kenny Dougall (yellow card) 53'		João Felipe 13', 56' (yellow card) 30' (yellow-red card) 78'; João Vitor Maia (yellow card) 12'	Stadium: Chang Arena; Attendance: 18,012; Referee: Jirawit Phonkaew

18 October 2026 5	Pattani	0–1	Buriram United	Songkhla
	Igor Neves (yellow card) 90+2'; Rodolfo Filemon (yellow card) 90+3'		Guilherme Bissoli 38'; Sasalak Haiprakhon (yellow card) 83'; Seb Moyano (yellow card) 85'; Paulinho (yellow card) 90+3'	Stadium: Tinsulanon Stadium; Attendance: 21,898; Referee: Alongkorn Khonwai

24 October 2026 6	Buriram United	2–3	Sisaket United	Buriram
	Supachai Chaided 36'; Kingsley Schindler 62'; Kenny Dougall (yellow card) 52'		Patrick Valverde 26'; Jefinho 31', 74'; Sittichok Kannoo (yellow card) 41'	Stadium: Chang Arena; Attendance: 21,203; Referee: Mongkolchai Pechsri

3 January 2027 7 (Rescheduled)	Buriram United	–	PT Prachuap	Buriram
				Stadium: Chang Arena

8 November 2026 8	Ratchaburi	1–2	Buriram United	Ratchaburi
	Njiva Rakotoharimalala 79'; Roque Mesa (yellow card) 36'		Pansa Hemviboon 16' (yellow card) 39'; Sebas Moyano 90+4'; Stefan Schimmer (yellow card) 36'	Stadium: Dragon Solar Park; Attendance: 8,795; Referee: Sivakorn Pu-udom

21 November 2026 9	Buriram United	–	BG Pathum United	Buriram
				Stadium: Chang Arena

28 November 2026 10	Rasisalai United	v	Buriram United	Sisaket
				Stadium: Sisaket Provincial Stadium

6 December 2026 11	Buriram United	–	Port	Buriram
				Stadium: Chang Arena

12 December 2026 12	Ayutthaya United	–	Buriram United	Ayutthaya
				Stadium: Ayutthaya Province Stadium

13 December 2026 13	Buriram United	–	Lamphun Warriors	Buriram
				Stadium: Chang Arena

23 December 2026 14	Uthai Thani	–	Buriram United	Uthai Thani
				Stadium: Uthai Thani Province Stadium

26 December 2026 15	Buriram United	–	Bangkok United	Buriram
				Stadium: Chang Arena

31 January 2027 16	Chiangrai United	–	Buriram United	Chiangrai
				Stadium: Singha Chiangrai Stadium

7 February 2027 17	Buriram United	–	Chonburi	Buriram
				Stadium: Chang Arena

20 February 2027 18	Rayong	–	Buriram United	Rayong
				Stadium: Rayong Province Stadium

28 February 2027 19	Buriram United	–	Pattani	Buriram
				Stadium: Chang Arena

6 March 2027 20	Sisaket United	–	Buriram United	Sisaket
				Stadium: Sri Nakhon Lamduan Stadium

13 March 2027 21	PT Prachuap	–	Buriram United	Prachuap
				Stadium: Sam Ao Stadium

21 March 2027 22	Buriram United	–	Ratchaburi	Buriram
				Stadium: Chang Arena

8 April 2027 23	BG Pathum United	–	Buriram United	Pathum Thani
				Stadium: True BG Stadium

17 April 2027 24	Buriram United	–	Rasisalai United	Buriram
				Stadium: Chang Arena

25 April 2027 25	Port	–	Buriram United	Bangkok
				Stadium: PAT Stadium

1 May 2027 26	Buriram United	–	Ayutthaya United	Buriram
				Stadium: Chang Arena

8 May 2027 27	Lamphun Warriors	–	Buriram United	Lamphun
				Stadium: Lamphun Warriors Stadium

15 May 2027 28	Buriram United	–	Uthai Thani	Buriram
				Stadium: Chang Arena

23 May 2027 29	Bangkok United	–	Buriram United	Pathum Thani
				Stadium: True BG Stadium

30 May 2027 30	Buriram United	–	Sukhothai	Buriram
				Stadium: Chang Arena

Pos	Team	Pld	W	D	L	GF	GA	GD	Pts
3	Ayutthaya United	8	5	1	2	14	8	+6	16
4	PT Prachuap	7	5	1	1	10	4	+6	16
5	Buriram United	7	5	1	1	13	8	+5	16
6	Ratchaburi	8	4	1	3	18	10	+8	13
7	BG Pathum United	8	3	3	2	12	8	+4	12

Updated to match(es) played on 8 November 2026. Source: Thai League 1 2026–27
Rules for classification: 1) Points; 2) Goal difference; 3) Goals scored.

=== Thai FA Cup ===
Win Draw Loss

21 October 2026 Rd of 64	Buriram United	8–0	DPU Thayang	Buriram
	Thanakrit Chotmuangpak 11', 33'; Stefan Schimmer 34', 85'; Narubodin Weerawatnodom 65'; Nathakorn Rattanasuwan 75'; Shinnaphat Leeaoh 79'; Phanuwit Jeyakom 87'		Suriya Raksaphakdee (yellow card) 29'	Stadium: Chang Arena; Attendance: 8,559; Referee: Manuschai Chawong

3-4 February 2027 Rd of 32	Nongbua Pitchaya	–	Buriram United	Nong Bua Lamphu
				Stadium: Pitchaya Stadium

=== Thai League Cup ===
8-10 December 2026 Rd of 32	Bangkok	–	Buriram United	Bangkok
				Stadium: 72nd Anniversary Stadium (Bang Mod)

=== AFC Champions League Elite ===
==== League stage ====
Win Draw Loss

Pos	Team	Pld	W	D	L	GF	GA	GD	Pts
10	(South Korea) Daejeon Hana Citizen	4	1	1	2	2	4	−2	4
11	(Vietnam) Công An Hà Nội	4	1	1	2	4	7	−3	4
12	(Thailand) Buriram United	4	0	3	1	2	3	−1	3
13	(Thailand) Port	4	1	0	3	9	14	−5	3
14	(Thailand) Ratchaburi	4	0	1	3	6	10	−4	1

Updated to match(es) played on 4 November 2026. Source: AFC
Rules for classification: 1) points; 2) goal difference; 3) number of goals scored; 4) number of matches won; 5) penalty shoot-out if only two teams remain tied and played each other on the final matchday 6) fair play ranking; 7) drawing of lots

15 September 2026 1	Johor Darul Ta'zim (Malaysia)	1–1	(Thailand) Buriram United	Johor, Malaysia
	Óscar Arribas 26'; Bergson (penalty missed) 86; Jonathan Silva (yellow card) 17'; Afiq Fazail (yellow card) 25'; Shahab Zahedi (yellow card) 45+1'; Kevin Medina (yellow card) 64'; Eddy Israfilov (red card) 90'	Report	Stefan Schimmer 43'; Kenny Dougall (yellow card) 35' (yellow-red card) 57'	Stadium: Sultan Ibrahim Stadium; Attendance: 32,325; Referee: Majed Al-Shamrani (Saudi Arabia)

13 October 2026 2	Buriram United (Thailand)	0–1	(China) Beijing Guoan	Buriram, Thailand
	Paulinho (yellow card) 31'	Report	Fábio Abreu 79'; Bai Yang (yellow card) 57'; Guilherme Ramos (yellow card) 73'; Serginho (yellow card) 90'	Stadium: Buriram Stadium; Attendance: 24,380; Referee: Alireza Faghani (Australia)

28 October 2026 3	Gamba Osaka (Japan)	1–1	(Thailand) Buriram United	Osaka, Japan
	Takashi Usami 66'; Ryo Hatsuse (yellow card) 87'	Report	Eduardo Mancha 39'	Stadium: Suita City Football Stadium; Attendance: 10,215; Referee: Zaid Thamer Mohammed (Iraq)

4 November 2026 4	Buriram United (Thailand)	0–0	(Japan) Kashima Antlers	Buriram, Thailand
	Kenny Dougall (yellow card) 87'	Report	Haruki Hayashi (yellow card) 63'	Stadium: Buriram Stadium; Attendance: 18,090; Referee: Nazmi Nasaruddin (Malaysia)

24 November 2026 5	Shanghai Port (China)	–	(Thailand) Buriram United	Shanghai, China
				Stadium: Pudong Football Stadium

1 December 2026 6	Buriram United (Thailand)	–	(Japan) Kyoto Sanga	Buriram, Thailand
				Stadium: Buriram Stadium

10 February 2027 7	Kashiwa Reysol (Japan)	–	(Thailand) Buriram United	Kashiwa, Japan
				Stadium: Sankyo Frontier Kashiwa Stadium

16 February 2027 8	Buriram United (Thailand)	–	(Japan) Vissel Kobe	Buriram, Thailand
				Stadium: Buriram Stadium

=== ASEAN Club Championship ===
==== Group stage ====
Pos	Team	Pld	W	D	L	GF	GA	GD	Pts	Qualification	TAM	CHC	BOR	KUC	RBM	BRU	MDF
1	(Singapore) Tampines Rovers	2	1	1	0	5	4	+1	4	Advance to knockout stage	—	9 Dec	—	—	3–2	—	24 Feb
2	(Vietnam) Công An Hồ Chí Minh City	2	1	1	0	2	1	+1	4	Advance to knockout stage	—	—	24 Feb	16 Dec	—	1–0	—
3	(Indonesia) Borneo	2	1	1	0	1	0	+1	4	Advance to knockout stage	3 Mar	—	—	—	16 Dec	—	1–0
4	(Malaysia) Kuching City	1	0	1	0	2	2	0	1	Advance to knockout stage	2–2	—	9 Dec	—	—	24 Feb	—
5	(Thailand) Ratchaburi	2	0	1	1	3	4	−1	1		—	1–1	—	31 Mar	—	—	9 Dec
6	(Thailand) Buriram United	2	0	1	1	0	1	−1	1		31 Mar	—	0–0	—	3 Mar	—	—
7	(Philippines) Manila Digger	1	0	0	1	0	1	−1	0		—	31 Mar	—	3 Mar	—	16 Dec	—

Updated to match(es) played on 18 November 2026. Source: ASEAN United
Rules for classification: Tiebreakers

7 October 2026 1	Buriram United (Thailand)	0–0	(Indonesia) Borneo	Buriram, Thailand
	Narubadin Weerawatnodom (yellow card) 74' (yellow-red card) 89'; Kenneth Dougall (yellow card) 85'	Report	Kablan N'Goma (yellow card) 35'	Stadium: Chang Arena; Attendance: 20,137; Referee: Majed Al-Shamrani (Saudi Arabia); Man of the Match: (Brazil) Guilherme Bissoli

18 November 2026 2	Công An Hồ Chí Minh City (Vietnam)	1–0	(Thailand) Buriram United	Vietnam
	Nguyễn Thái Quốc Cường 88' (yellow card) 89'; Đào Quoc Gia (yellow card) 82'	Report	Pansa Hemviboon (yellow card) 27'; Phitiwat Sookjitthammakul (yellow card) 57'	Stadium: Bình Dương Stadium, Ho Chi Minh City; Referee: Nazmi Nasaruddin (Malaysia)

16 December 2026 3	Manila Digger (Philippines)	–	(Thailand) Buriram United	Philippines
		Report

24 February 2027 4	Kuching City (Malaysia)	–	(Thailand) Buriram United	Kuching, Malaysia
		Report		Stadium: Sarawak Stadium

3 March 2027 5	Buriram United (Thailand)	–	(Thailand) Ratchaburi	Buriram, Thailand
		Report		Stadium: Chang Arena

31 March 2027 6	Buriram United (Thailand)	–	(Singapore) Tampines Rovers	Buriram, Thailand
		Report		Stadium: Chang Arena

== Statistics ==
=== Appearances and goals ===
As of 18 Nov 26

No.	Pos.	Player	Thai League		FA Cup		League Cup		AFC Champions League Elite		ASEAN Club Championship		Total	
No.	Pos.	Player	Apps	Goals	Apps	Goals	Apps	Goals	Apps	Goals	Apps	Goals	Apps	Goals
2	MF	(Thailand) Sasalak Haiprakhon	7	0	0	0	0	0	2+1	0	1+1	0	12	0
3	DF	(Thailand) Pansa Hemviboon	1+1	1	1	0	0	0	0	0	1	0	4	1
4	FW	(Iran) Reza Asadi	0	0	0	0	0	0	1	0	0	0	1	0
5	DF	(Brazil) Nathan Pelae	6	0	0	0	0	0	3	0	0+1	0	10	0
6	DF	(Australia) Curtis Good	0	0	0	0	0	0	3	0	0	0	3	0
7	FW	(Brazil) Guilherme Bissoli	7	5	0	0	0	0	4	0	1	0	12	5
8	FW	(Brazil) Paulo Henrique	2+5	0	0	0	0	0	1+3	0	1	0	12	0
9	FW	(Thailand) Supachai Chaided	4+2	2	0	0	0	0	1	0	0	0	7	2
10	MF	(Spain) Sebas Moyano	3+4	1	0	0	0	0	1+2	0	0+1	0	11	1
11	FW	(Thailand) Anan Yodsangwal	0	0	1	0	0	0	0	0	0	0	1	0
13	GK	(Philippines) (England) Neil Etheridge	7	0	0	0	0	0	4	0	1	0	12	0
15	DF	(Thailand) Narubadin Weerawatnodom	0	0	1	1	0	0	0	0	1	0	2	1
16	DF	(Thailand) (Australia) Kenny Dougall	6+1	0	0	0	0	0	3	0	2	0	12	0
17	DF	(Spain) Lucas Ahijado	0	0	0	0	0	0	1	0	0	0	1	0
18	MF	(Montenegro) Vukan Savićević	0	0	0	0	0	0	0+1	0	0+1	0	2	0
19	MF	(Ghana) (Germany) Kingsley Schindler	4+1	1	0	0	0	0	3+1	0	1	0	10	1
20	MF	(Spain) Toni Moya	0	0	0	0	0	0	3	0	2	0	5	0
21	FW	(Thailand) Iklas Sanron	0	0	0	0	0	0	0	0	0	0	0	0
22	DF	(Spain) Marc Navarro	2	0	0	0	0	0	0	0	0	0	2	0
23	MF	(Serbia) Goran Čaušić	3+1	0	0	0	0	0	3	0	1	0	8	0
25	MF	(Algeria) (France) Yassine Benzia	0	0	0	0	0	0	0	0	0	0	0	0
26	DF	(Serbia) Uroš Radaković	4	0	0	0	0	0	1	0	1	0	6	0
27	MF	(Thailand) Phitiwat Sukjitthammakul	2+4	0	0	0	0	0	1+1	0	2	0	10	0
28	FW	(Spain) Rubén Sánchez	0	0	0	0	0	0	0	0	0	0	0	0
29	GK	(Thailand) Korraphat Nareechan	0	0	0	0	0	0	0	0	0	0	0	0
30	FW	(Germany) Stefan Schimmer	3+2	1	1	2	0	0	1+1	1	0+2	0	10	4
31	FW	(Brazil) Caju	0	0	1	0	0	0	2+1	0	1+1	0	6	0
33	MF	(Thailand) Thanakrit Chotmuangpak	0+3	1	1	2	0	0	0+1	0	2	0	7	3
34	GK	(Thailand) Chatchai Budprom	0	0	1	0	0	0	0	0	1	0	2	0
37	FW	(Brazil) Darlan	2+1	0	0	0	0	0	3	0	0	0	5	0
39	MF	(Thailand) Jakkaphan Praisuwan	4+2	0	1	0	0	0	0	0	0+1	0	8	0
40	DF	(Brazil) Eduardo Mancha	0	0	1	0	0	0	2+1	1	2	0	6	1
48	DF	(Thailand) Wanthayawut Nutkrasae	0	0	0	0	0	0	0	0	0	0	0	0
54	FW	(Thailand) Nathakorn Rattanasuwan	0	0	1	1	0	0	0	0	0	0	1	1
55	MF	(Thailand) Theerathon Bunmathan	7	0	0	0	0	0	0+2	0	0	0	9	0
75	DF	(Thailand) Shinnaphat Leeaoh	1+2	0	1	1	0	0	0	0	0	0	4	1
78	DF	(Thailand) Supanat Mahawai	0	0	0+1	0	0	0	0	0	0	0	1	0
80	MF	(Thailand) Phanuphong Jeyakom	0	0	0+1	1	0	0	0	0	0	0	1	1
88	MF	(Thailand) Dutsadee Buranajutanon	0	0	0+1	0	0	0	0	0	0	0	1	0
90	FW	(Thailand) Phanuwit Jeyakom	0	0	0+1	0	0	0	0	0	0	0	1	0
99	MF	(Romania) Alexandru Tudorie	0+2	0	0	0	0	0	1+2	0	1+1	0	7	0
Players who have left on loan
18	FW	(Thailand) (Norway) Athit Berg	0	0	0	0	0	0	0	0	0	0	0	0
20	DF	(Guinea-Bissau) (Spain) Marcelo Djaló	0	0	0	0	0	0	0	0	0	0	0	0
24	DF	(Thailand) (Sweden) Elias Dolah	0	0	0	0	0	0	0	0	0	0	0	0
40	DF	(Philippines) (Japan) Jefferson Tabinas	0	0	0	0	0	0	0	0	0	0	0	0
49	MF	(Thailand) Piyawat Petra	0	0	0	0	0	0	0	0	0	0	0	0
50	DF	(Thailand) Singha Marasa	0	0	0	0	0	0	0	0	0	0	0	0
55	MF	(Thailand) Theerathon Bunmathan	0	0	0	0	0	0	0	0	0	0	0	0
55	DF	(Spain) Juan Ibiza	0	0	0	0	0	0	0	0	0	0	0	0
70	FW	(Thailand) Jirapong Pungviravong	0	0	0	0	0	0	0	0	0	0	0	0
89	MF	(Thailand) Pongsakron Hanrattana	0	0	0	0	0	0	0	0	0	0	0	0
91	FW	(Thailand) (Netherlands) Phumin William Boers	0	0	0	0	0	0	0	0	0	0	0	0
92	DF	(Thailand) Thanison Paibulkijcharoen	0	0	0	0	0	0	0	0	0	0	0	0
??	GK	(Thailand) Phumworraphon Wannabutr	0	0	0	0	0	0	0	0	0	0	0	0
Players who have left permanently
32	FW	(Austria) (Croatia) Robert Žulj	2	0	0	0	0	0	0	0	0	0	2	0
44	MF	(Austria) (Croatia) Peter Žulj	0	0	0	0	0	0	0	0	0	0	0	0
