= 2024–25 Buriram United F.C. season =

Buriram United
2024–25 season
- Chairman: Newin Chidchob
- Head coach: Osmar Loss
- Stadium: Chang Arena
- Thai League: 1st (champions)
- FA Cup: Winners
- League Cup: Winners
- AFC Champions League Elite: Quarter-finals
- ASEAN Club Championship: Winners
- Top goalscorer: League: Guilherme Bissoli (25); All: Guilherme Bissoli (43)
- Average home league attendance: 18,363
| Home colours | Away colours |

The 2024–25 season was Buriram United's 13th season in the Thai League. (15th if including P.E.A.'s two seasons) The club will participate in the Thai League, Thai FA Cup, Thai League Cup, AFC Champions League Elite, and ASEAN Club Championship.

Buriram United, 2023–24 Thai League 1 champion, is supposed to kick off the season by competing in the Thailand Champions Cup against True Bangkok United. However, on July 9, 2024, Thai FA announced that the 2024 edition of the Thailand Champions Cup will not be held.

On 20 June 2024, Buriram United announced that Osmar Loss will be their manager in the upcoming 2024–25 season.

On June 25, 2024, Thai League announced the program for the upcoming 2024–25 Thai League 1 season. The season commenced on August 9, 2024, and will conclude on April 27, 2025.

== Squad ==
As of 20 August 2024

| Squad No. | Name | Nationality | Date of birth (age) | Previous club |
Goalkeepers
| 1 | Siwarak Tedsungnoen (Vice-captain) | (Thailand) | 20 April 1984 (age 42) | (Thailand) TOT S.C. |
| 13 | Neil Etheridge | (Philippines) (England) | 7 February 1990 (age 36) | (England) Birmingham City F.C. |
| 34 | Chatchai Budprom | (Thailand) | 4 February 1987 (age 39) | (Thailand) PT Prachuap |
| 35 | Kittipong Boonmak | (Thailand) | 22 March 2005 (age 21) | Youth team |
| 75 | Phumworraphon Wannabutr | (Thailand) | 14 October 2004 (age 22) | Youth team |
| 98 | Anu Samra | (Thailand) | 16 March 2006 (age 20) | Youth team |
Defenders
| 3 | Pansa Hemviboon | (Thailand) | 8 July 1990 (age 36) | (Thailand) Khon Kaen United F.C. |
| 6 | Curtis Good | (Australia) | 23 March 1993 (age 33) | (Australia) Melbourne City FC |
| 11 | Dion Cools | (Malaysia) (Belgium) | 4 June 1996 (age 30) | (Czech Republic) FK Jablonec |
| 15 | Narubadin Weerawatnodom (captain) | (Thailand) | 12 July 1994 (age 32) | (Thailand) BEC Tero Sasana F.C. |
| 16 | Kenny Dougall | (Thailand) (Australia) | 7 May 1993 (age 33) | (England) Blackpool F.C. |
| 20 | Marcelo Djaló | (Guinea-Bissau) (Spain) | 8 October 1993 (age 33) | (Spain) Palencia CF |
| 22 | Ko Myeong-seok | (South Korea) | 27 September 1995 (age 31) | (South Korea) Daegu FC |
| 28 | Maxx Creevey | (Thailand) (Australia) | 28 April 1995 (age 31) | (Thailand) Nakhon Pathom United |
| 37 | Rene Renner | (Austria) | 29 November 1993 (age 32) | (Austria) LASK |
| 40 | Jefferson Tabinas | (Philippines) (Japan) (Ghana) | 7 August 1998 (age 28) | (Japan) Mito HollyHock |
| 50 | Singha Marasa | (Thailand) | 19 August 2006 (age 20) | Youth team |
| 92 | Kim Min-hyeok | (South Korea) | 27 February 1992 (age 34) | (South Korea) Seongnam FC |
Midfielders
| 2 | Sasalak Haiprakhon | (Thailand) | 8 January 1996 (age 30) | (Thailand) Bangkok United F.C. |
| 4 | Leon James | (Thailand) (England) | 29 August 2001 (age 25) | (Thailand) Nongbua Pitchaya F.C. |
| 5 | Theerathon Bunmathan | (Thailand) | 6 February 1990 (age 36) | (Japan) Yokohama F. Marinos |
| 8 | Ratthanakorn Maikami | (Thailand) | 7 January 1998 (age 28) | Youth team |
| 10 | Lucas Crispim | (Brazil) | 19 June 1994 (age 32) | (Brazil) Fortaleza |
| 18 | Athit Berg | (Thailand) (Norway) | 11 January 1998 (age 28) | (Thailand) Nakhon Pathom United F.C. |
| 21 | Suphanat Mueanta | (Thailand) | 2 August 2002 (age 24) | (Belgium) OH Leuven |
| 23 | Goran Čaušić | (Serbia) | 5 May 1992 (age 34) | (Russia) FC Arsenal Tula |
| 27 | Phitiwat Sukjitthammakul | (Thailand) | 1 February 1995 (age 31) | (Thailand) BG Pathum United F.C. |
| 44 | Peter Žulj | (Austria) | 9 June 1993 (age 33) | (China) Changchun Yatai F.C. |
| 70 | Jirapong Pungviravong | (Thailand) | 20 September 2006 (age 20) | Youth team |
| 88 | Dutsadee Buranajutanon | (Thailand) | 7 March 2006 (age 20) | Youth team |
| 89 | Pongsakron Hanrattana | (Thailand) | 21 April 2003 (age 23) | Youth team |
| 95 | Seksan Ratree | (Thailand) | 14 March 2003 (age 23) | Youth team |
| | Thanakrit Chotmuangpak | (Thailand) | 1 September 2006 (age 20) | Youth team |
Forwards
| 7 | Guilherme Bissoli | (Brazil) | 9 January 1998 (age 28) | (Brazil) Ceará |
| 9 | Supachai Chaided | (Thailand) | 1 December 1998 (age 27) | (Thailand) Super Power Samut Prakan F.C. |
| 45 | Martin Boakye | (Italy) (Ghana) | 10 February 1995 (age 31) | (China) Qingdao Hainiu |
| 54 | Nathakorn Rattanasuwan | (Thailand) | 5 December 2007 (age 18) | Youth team |
Players loaned out during season
| 19 | Chrigor | (Brazil) | 13 November 2000 (age 26) | (Brazil) Portuguesa |
| 48 | Wanthayawut Nutkrasae | (Thailand) | 25 September 2005 (age 21) | Youth team |
| 49 | Piyawat Petra | (Thailand) | 15 March 2005 (age 21) | Youth team |
| 91 | Phumin William Boers | (Thailand) (Netherlands) | 15 January 2003 (age 23) | Youth team |
| | Caelan Tanadon Ryan | (Thailand) (England) | 12 October 2005 (age 21) | (England) Port Vale |
Players left during season
| 17 | Charalampos Charalampous | (Thailand) (Cyprus) | 1 July 1999 (age 27) | (Thailand) Uthai Thani F.C. |
| 96 | Matheus Vargas | (Brazil) | 18 June 1996 (age 30) | (Brazil) Fortaleza |

== Transfer ==
=== In ===
Pre-season transfer

| Position | Player | Transferred from | Fee | Ref |
|---|---|---|---|---|
| DF | (Australia) Curtis Good | (Australia) Melbourne City | Free | |
| GK | (Philippines) (England) Neil Etheridge | (England) Birmingham City | Free | |
| DF | (Thailand) (Cyprus) Charalampos Charalampous | (Thailand) Uthai Thani | Free | |
| DF | (Guinea-Bissau) (Spain) Marcelo Djaló | (Spain) Palencia | Free | |
| MF | (Thailand) (Norway) Athit Berg | (Thailand) Nakhon Pathom United | Free | |
| MF | (Thailand) Phitiwat Sukjitthammakul | (Thailand) BG Pathum United | Exchange for (Thailand) Thanadol Kaosaart, (Thailand) Thawatchai Inprakhon, and (Thailand) Airfan Doloh | |
| MF | (Brazil) Matheus Vargas | Unattached (Note: Most recently played for Fortaleza) | Free | |
| FW | (Brazil) Chrigor | Unattached (Note: Most recently played for Portuguesa) | Free | |
| FW | (Thailand) (England) Caelan Tanadon Ryan | (England) Port Vale | Free | |

Mid-season transfer

| Position | Player | Transferred from | Fee | Ref |
|---|---|---|---|---|
| GK | (Thailand) Chatchai Budprom | (Thailand) BG Pathum United | Undiclosed | |
| DF | (South Korea) Ko Myeong-seok | (South Korea) Daegu FC | Undiclosed | |
| DF | (Thailand) (Australia) Maxx Creevey | (Thailand) Nakhon Pathom United | Free | |
| MF | (Austria) Rene Renner | (Austria) LASK | Undiclosed | |
| MF | (Austria) Peter Žulj | (China) Changchun Yatai F.C. | Undiclosed | |
| MF | (Serbia) Goran Čaušić | Unattached (Note: Goran Čaušić returns to the club in September after initially being released) | Free | |
| FW | (Italy) (Ghana) Martin Boakye | (China) Qingdao Hainiu F.C. | Undiclosed | |

=== Loan Return ===
Mid-Season

| Position | Player | Transferred from | Fee | Ref |
|---|---|---|---|---|
| FW | (Thailand) Suphanat Mueanta | (Belgium) OH Leuven | End of loan | |

=== Out ===
Preseason

| Position | Player | Transferred To | Fee | Ref |
|---|---|---|---|---|
| MF | (Thailand) Peeradon Chamratsamee | (Thailand) Port | Undisclosed | |
| FW | (Guinea) Lonsana Doumbouya | (Thailand) Port | Free | |
| FW | (Slovenia) Haris Vučkić | Unattached (Note: Later joined Domžale) | End of contract | |
| MF | (Thailand) (France) Chakkit Laptrakul | (Thailand) Uthai Thani | Free | |
| DF | (Thailand) (Australia) Maxx Creevey | (Thailand) Nakhon Pathom United | Free | |
| MF | (Thailand) Thanadol Kaosaart | (Thailand) BG Pathum United | Exchange for (Thailand) Phitiwat Sukjitthammakul | |
| DF | (Thailand) Thawatchai Inprakhon | (Thailand) BG Pathum United | Exchange for (Thailand) Phitiwat Sukjitthammakul | |
| MF | (Thailand) Airfan Doloh | (Thailand) BG Pathum United | Exchange for (Thailand) Phitiwat Sukjitthammakul | |
| MF | (Serbia) Goran Čaušić | Unattached | End of contract | |
| MF | (Thailand) Thanawat Saipetch | Unattached | End of contract | |
| DF | (Thailand) Chitipat Tanklang | Retired | | |
| GK | (Thailand) Yotsapon Teangdar | Retired | | |

Mid-season

| Position | Player | Transferred To | Fee | Ref |
|---|---|---|---|---|
| FW | (Brazil) Matheus Vargas | (Brazil) Paysandu | Undisclosed | |

=== Loan Out ===
Preseason

| Position | Player | Transferred To | Fee | Ref |
|---|---|---|---|---|
| GK | (Thailand) Nopphon Lakhonphon | (Thailand) Nakhon Si United | Season loan | |
| DF | (Thailand) Kritsana Daokrajai | (Thailand) Nakhon Si United | Season loan | |
| DF | (Thailand) Thanison Paibulkijcharoen | (Thailand) Nakhon Ratchasima | Season loan | |
| DF | (Thailand) Suporn Peenagatapho | (Thailand) Ratchaburi | Season loan | |
| MF | (Thailand) Chutipol Thongthae | (Thailand) PT Prachuap | Season loan | |
| FW | (Thailand) Arthit Boodjinda | (Thailand) Rayong | Season loan | |
| FW | (Thailand) (England) Siam Yapp | (Thailand) Nakhon Ratchasima | Season loan | |
| FW | (Thailand) Suphanat Mueanta | (Belgium) OH Leuven | Season loan | |

Mid-Season

| Position | Player | Transferred To | Fee | Ref |
|---|---|---|---|---|
| DF | (Thailand) (Cyprus) Charalampos Charalampous | (Thailand) Uthai Thani | Season loan | |
| DF | (Thailand) (Netherlands) Phumin William Boers | (Thailand) Police Tero | Season loan | |
| MF | (Thailand) Ratthaphum Pankhejorn | (Thailand) Police Tero | Season loan | |
| MF | (Thailand) Paripan Wongsa | (Thailand) Sisaket United | Season loan | |
| MF | (Thailand) Wanthayawut Nutkrasae | (Thailand) Muang Loei United | Season loan | |
| FW | (Thailand) Panuphong Wongpila | (Thailand) Sisaket United | Season loan | |
| FW | (Thailand) Piyawat Petra | (Thailand) Kanchanaburi | Season loan | |
| FW | (Thailand) (England) Caelan Tanadon Ryan | (Thailand) Sisaket United | Season loan | |
| FW | (Brazil) Chrigor | (Thailand) PT Prachuap | Season loan | |

=== Rumored ===
Postseason (In)

| Position | Player | Transferred from | Fee | Ref |
|---|---|---|---|---|
| DF | (Thailand) (Sweden) Elias Dolah | (Indonesia) Bali United | Free | |
| DF | (Indonesia) (Netherlands) Shayne Pattynama | (Belgium) Eupen | Free | |
| MF | (Thailand) Pathompol Charoenrattanapirom | (Thailand) Port | Free | |
| FW | (Austria) Robert Žulj | (Austria) LASK | Free | |

Postseason (Out)

| Position | Player | Transferred To | Fee | Ref |
|---|---|---|---|---|
| GK | (Thailand) Siwarak Tedsungnoen | Retired | N.A. | |
| DF | (Malaysia) (Belgium) Dion Cools | (Japan) Cerezo Osaka | Undisclosed | |
| DF | (Philippines) (Japan) (Ghana) Jefferson Tabinas | (Thailand) Chonburi | Season loan | |

=== Overview ===
| Competition | First match | Last match | Starting round | Final position | Record | | | | | | | |
| Competition | First match | Last match | Starting round | Final position | Pld | W | D | L | GF | GA | GD | Win % |
|---|---|---|---|---|---|---|---|---|---|---|---|---|
| Thai League 1 | 10 August 2024 | 30 April 2025 | Matchday 1 | Winner | 30 | 22 | 4 | 4 | 92 | 20 | +72 | 73.33 |
| Thai FA Cup | 13 June 2024 | 24 August 2024 | Round of 64 | Winner | 6 | 6 | 0 | 0 | 18 | 3 | +15 | 100.00 |
| Thai League Cup | 20 November 2024 | 26 April 2025 | Round of 32 | Winner | 5 | 5 | 0 | 0 | 16 | 3 | +13 | 100.00 |
| AFC Champions League Elite | 18 September 2024 | 11 March 2025 | League Phase | Quarter-Final | 11 | 4 | 4 | 3 | 8 | 15 | −7 | 36.36 |
| ASEAN Club Championship | 22 August 2024 | 21 May 2025 | Group Stage | Winners | 9 | 4 | 4 | 1 | 21 | 8 | +13 | 44.44 |
| Total | | | | | 61 | 41 | 12 | 8 | 155 | 49 | +106 | 67.21 |

Last updated: 22 March 2025
Source: Competitions

== Competition ==
=== Thai League ===
==== League table ====
| Pos | Team | Pld | W | D | L | GF | GA | GD | Pts | Qualification |
|---|---|---|---|---|---|---|---|---|---|---|
| 1 | Buriram United (C) | 30 | 22 | 4 | 4 | 92 | 20 | +72 | 70 | Qualification for AFC Champions League Elite League stage and ASEAN Club Championship group stage |
| 2 | Bangkok United | 30 | 21 | 6 | 3 | 63 | 30 | +33 | 69 | Qualification for AFC Champions League Elite qualifiers and ASEAN Club Championship group stage |
| 3 | BG Pathum United | 30 | 15 | 8 | 7 | 47 | 34 | +13 | 53 | Qualification for AFC Champions League Two group stage and ASEAN Club Championship group stage |
| 4 | Ratchaburi | 30 | 15 | 7 | 8 | 65 | 47 | +18 | 52 | Qualification for AFC Champions League Two group stage |
| 5 | Port | 30 | 13 | 9 | 8 | 52 | 39 | +13 | 48 | |

Source: Thai League
Rules for classification: Season in progress: 1) Points; 2) Goal difference; 3) Goals scored; End of season: 1) Points; 2) Head-to-head points; 3) Head-to-head goal difference; 4) Goals scored.
(C) Champions

==== Results overview ====
| Overall | | | | | | | | Home | | | | | | Away | | | | | |
| Pld | W | D | L | GF | GA | GD | Pts | W | D | L | GF | GA | GD | W | D | L | GF | GA | GD |
|---|---|---|---|---|---|---|---|---|---|---|---|---|---|---|---|---|---|---|---|
| 6 | 5 | 1 | 0 | 19 | 2 | +17 | 16 | 2 | 0 | 0 | 7 | 2 | +5 | 3 | 1 | 0 | 12 | 0 | +12 |

==== Matches ====
Win Draw Loss

| 10 August 2024 1 | Nongbua Pitchaya | 0–4 | Buriram United | Nongbua |
| | Kittikun Jamsuwan (red card) 41'; Jardel Capistrano (yellow card) 68' | | Cools 10'; Crispim 62'; Bissoli 76'; Supachai Chaided 83'; Phitiwat Sukjitthammakul (yellow card) 72' | Stadium: Pitchaya Stadium; Attendance: 5,955; Referee: Niwat Insa-ard |

| 18 August 2024 2 | Buriram United | 4–2 | True Bangkok United | Buriram |
| | Crispim 27'; Bissoli 56' 76'; Seksan 90+4' (yellow card) 90+3' | | Al-Ghassani 16'; Nitipong 53' (yellow card) 26'; Suphan Thongsong (yellow card) 26' | Stadium: Chang Arena; Attendance: 25,093; Referee: Jirawit Phonkaew |

| 25 August 2024 3 | Singha Chiangrai United | 0–5 | Buriram United | Chiangrai |
| | Atikun Mheetuam (yellow card) 58'; Thanawat Pimoytha (yellow card) 72'; Piyaphon Phanichakul (yellow card) 90' | | Crispim 8'; Supachai Chaided 20'; Bissoli 53' (yellow card) 44'; Chrigor 67'; Pansa 79'; Kenny Dougall (yellow card) 45' | Stadium: Singha Chiangrai Stadium; Attendance: 6,193; Referee: Peerasan Krataithong |

| 29 August 2024 4 | Khonkaen United | 0–3 | Buriram United | Khonkaen |
| | Diego Landis (yellow card) 42'; Saharat Posri (yellow card) 57'; Steve Ambri (yellow card) 61' | | Supachai Chaided 45+1'; Crispim 65'; Bissoli 85'; Matheus Vargas (yellow card) 63' | Stadium: Khonkaen Stadium; Attendance: 6,167; Referee: Wicharn Klinthaworn |

| 1 September 2024 5 | Buriram United | 3–0 | Nakhon Pathom United | Buriram |
| | Supachai Chaided 45'; Sasalak 71'; Chrigor 90+2'; Jefferson Tabinas (yellow card) 45+3'; Dion Cools (yellow card) 90+8' | | Leslie Adjei Ablorh (yellow card) 85' | Stadium: Chang Arena; Attendance: 16,644; Referee: Niwat Insa-ard |

| 12 September 2024 (Note: Thai League rescheduled the match between Port F.C. and Buriram United F.C. from September 14 to September 12 due to both team participate in the AFC competitions.) 6 | Port | 0–0 | Buriram United | Bangkok |
| | Noboru Shimura (yellow card) 33'; Chaiyawat Buran (yellow card) 88'; Isaac Honny (yellow card) 90+4'; Teerasak Poeiphimai (yellow card) 90+5' | | Supachai Chaided 45+1'; (yellow card) 51'; Chrigor (yellow card) 90+5' | Stadium: PAT Stadium; Attendance: 6,250; Referee: U-sen Yala |

| 22 September 2024 7 | Buriram United | 6–0 | PT Prachuap | Buriram |
| | Supachai Chaided 9'; Pansa 14'; Bissoli 53'; Theerathon 79'; Tabinas 86'; Chrigor 89' | | Amirali Chegini (yellow card) 42'; Sanukran Thinjom (yellow card) 43'; Pawee Tanthatemee (yellow card) 55' | Stadium: Chang Arena; Attendance: 15,282; Referee: Jirawit Phonkaew |

| 29 December 2024 8 (Rescheduled) | BG Pathum United | 0–2 | Buriram United | Pathum Thani |
| | | | Chrigor 73' (yellow card) 71'; Lucas Crispim 77' (yellow card) 77'; Sasalak Haiprakhon (yellow card) 54' | Stadium: BG Stadium; Attendance: 11,469; Referee: Torphong Somsing |

| 22 December 2024 9 (Rescheduled) | Buriram United | 1–0 | Muangthong United | Buriram |
| | Guilherme Bissoli 68'; Theerathon Bunmathan (yellow card) 15'; Sasalak Haiprakhon (yellow card) 90+1'; Neil Etheridge (yellow card) 90+8' | | Theerapat Laohabut (yellow card) 50' (yellow-red card); Sorawit Panthong (yellow card) 56'; Wongsakorn Chaikultewin (yellow card) 64' | Stadium: Chang Arena; Attendance: 21,220; Referee: Warintorn Sassadee |

| 17 October 2024 10 (Rescheduled) | Buriram United | 1–0 | Uthai Thani | Buriram |
| | Guilherme Bissoli 35' | | Júlio César (yellow card) 8'; Jhonatan Agudelo (yellow card) 83' | Stadium: Chang Arena; Attendance: 16,107; Referee: Vitsavet Sangnakorn |

| 26 October 2024 11 (Rescheduled) | Buriram United | 1–1 | Lamphun Warriors | Buriram |
| | Guilherme Bissoli 64' (pen.) | | Ricardo Lopes Pereira 46' (yellow card) 57'; Teerawut Churok (yellow card) 12'; Maung Maung Lwin (yellow card) 69'; Nuttee Noiwilai (red card) 75'; Akarapong Pumwisat (yellow card) 81'; Anan Yodsangwal (yellow card) 83' | Stadium: Chang Arena; Attendance: 21,059; Referee: Wiwat Jumpaoon |

| 14 December 2024 12 (Rescheduled) | Nakhon Ratchasima | 1–5 | Buriram United | Nakhon Ratchasima |
| | Deyvison 82'; Weerawat Jiraphaksiri (yellow card) 53'; Lee Jong-Cheon (yellow card) 83' | | Chrigor 8', 65'; Supachai Chaided 15'; Dion Cool 83'; Athit Berg 90+1' (pen.); Marcelo Djaló (yellow card) 29' | Stadium: 80th Birthday Stadium; Attendance: 15,320; Referee: Warintorn Sassadee |

| 10 November 2024 13 (Rescheduled) | Rayong | 1–1 | Buriram United | Rayong |
| | Peerapat Kaminthong 84'; Reungyos Janchaichit (yellow card) 41'; Theppitak Pholjuang (yellow card) 61'; Korrakot Pipatnadda (yellow card) 90+9' | | Korrakot Pipatnadda 26' (o.g.) | Stadium: Rayong Province Stadium; Attendance: 7,500; Referee: Alongkorn Khonwai |

| 22 November 2024 14 (Rescheduled) | Buriram United | 2–0 | Sukhothai | Buriram |
| | Crispim 21' (pen.); Guilherme Bissoli 83'; Phitiwat Sukjitthammakul (yellow card) 17' | | Siroch Chatthong (yellow card) 35' | Stadium: Chang Arena; Attendance: 15,214; Referee: Paisan Bendem-Alee |

| 7 December 2024 15 (Rescheduled) | Buriram United | 6–0 | Ratchaburi | Buriram |
| | Guilherme Bissoli 33', 60', 74', 76'; Chrigor 67'; Jefferson Tabinas 90+4' | | Gabriel Mutombo Kupa (yellow card) 85' | Stadium: Chang Arena; Attendance: 15,654; Referee: Torphong Somsing |

| 12 January 2025 16 (Rescheduled) | Bangkok United | 3–2 | Buriram United | Pathum Thani |
| | Bassel Jradi 14' (yellow card) 78'; Al-Ghassani 39'; Nitipong Selanon 90+2' (yellow card) 90+2'; Mahmoud Eid (yellow card) 55' | | Supachai Chaided 45+1'; Guilherme Bissoli 65'; Goran Čaušić (yellow card) 83'; Theerathon Bunmathan (yellow card) 87' | Stadium: BG Stadium (Note: Bangkok United played their home matches at BG Stadium, Pathum Thani, instead of their regular home stadium Thammasat Stadium, Bangkok because their home stadium is not available on the day.); Attendance: 7,093; Referee: Torphong Somsing |

| 15 January 2025 17 (Rescheduled) | Buriram United | 8–0 | Singha Chiangrai United | Buriram |
| | Goran Čaušić 5', 23'; Supachai Chaided 21'; Apirak Woravong 29' (o.g.); Guilherme Bissoli 35' (pen.), 73'; Suphanat Mueanta 76'; Lucas Crispim 90+1' (pen.) | | | Stadium: Chang Arena; Attendance: 15,577; Referee: Kotchapoom Meesridaecha |

| 19 January 2025 18 (Rescheduled) | Buriram United | 9–0 | Khonkaen United | Buriram |
| | Martin Boakye 1', 6', 78' (pen.); Guilherme Bissoli 13', 31'; Suphanat Mueanta 36', 87', 90+3'; Ratthanakorn Maikami 90+1' | | Tinnakorn Asurin (yellow card) 68' (yellow-red card) | Stadium: Chang Arena; Attendance: 15,394; Referee: Chaireag Ngamsom |

| 26 January 2025 19 | Nakhon Pathom United | 1–3 | Buriram United | Nakhon Ratchasima |
| | Sunchai Chaolaokhwan 24'; Valdo (yellow card) 10'; Sunchai Chaolaokhwan (yellow card) 40'; Auttapon Sangtong (yellow card) 47'; Amir Hossein Nemati (yellow card) 77'; Sajjaporn Tumsuwan (yellow card) 90+5' | | Martin Boakye 38'; Suphanat Mueanta 44'; Goran Čaušić 57'; Sasalak Haiprakhon (yellow card) 28' | Stadium: 80th Birthday Stadium; Attendance: 4,890; Referee: Woottipong Ketkam |

| 2 February 2025 20 | Buriram United | 0–1 | Port | Buriram |
| | | | Chinnawat Wongchai 25'; Chanukun Karin (yellow card) 38'; Barros Tardeli (yellow card) 68'; Chaiwat Buran (yellow card) 71'; Somporn Yos (yellow card) 90+5' | Stadium: Chang Arena; Attendance: 31,305; Referee: Torphong Somsing |

| 29 January 2025 21 (Rescheduled) | PT Prachuap | 1–2 | Buriram United | Prachuap Khiri Khan |
| | Keron Ornchaiyaphum 23'; Rattanai Songsangchan (yellow card) 37'; Amirali Chegini (yellow card) 67'; Chatmongkol Thongkiri (yellow card) 82' | | Suphanat Mueanta 53'; Guilherme Bissoli 68' (pen.); Jefferson Tabinas (yellow card) 88'; Neil Etheridge (yellow card) 90+13' | Stadium: Sam Ao Stadium; Attendance: 4,880; Referee: Chaikrit Inboonsong |

| 12 April 2025 22 (Rescheduled) | Buriram United | 1–2 | BG Pathum United | Buriram |
| | Suphanat Mueanta 42'; Kim Min-hyeok (yellow card) 60'; Dion Cools (yellow card) 90+4' | | Sanchai Nontasila 10'; Kritsada Kaman 79'; Warinthon Jamnongwat (yellow card) 78' | Stadium: Chang Arena; Attendance: 15,111; Referee: Warintorn Sassadee |

| 23 February 2025 23 | Muangthong United | 1–3 | Buriram United | Pathum Thani |
| | Guilherme Bissoli 41' (o.g.); Songwut Kraikruan (yellow card) 4'; Hong Jeong-un (yellow card) 74'; Tristan Do (yellow card) 87' | | Sasalak Haiprakhon 12'; Hong Jeong-un 54' (o.g.); Ratthanakorn Maikami 87'; Phitiwat Sukjitthammakul (yellow card) 28'; Dion Cools (yellow card) 78' | Stadium: BG Stadium (Note: Muangthong United played their home matches at BG Stadium, Pathum Thani, instead of their regular home stadium Thunderdome Stadium], Nonthaburi because their home stadium is not available on the day.); Attendance: 10,323; Referee: Kotchapoom Meesridaecha |

| 1 March 2025 24 | Uthai Thani | 0–0 | Buriram United | Uthai Thani |
| | Justin Baas (yellow card) 90' | | | Stadium: Uthai Thani Province Stadium; Attendance: 5,015; Referee: Ekkachai Phetcham |

| 26 March 2025 25 (Rescheduled) | Lamphun Warriors | 1–2 | Buriram United | Lamphun |
| | Mohammed Osman 34'; Negueba (yellow card) 20'; Júnior Batista (yellow card) 57'; Wittawin Clowuttiwat (yellow card) 90+5' | | Supachai Chaided 70'; Guilherme Bissoli 90' (pen.); Kenny Dougall (yellow card) 32'; Marcelo Amado Djaló (yellow card) 90+8'; Neil Etheridge (yellow card) 90+12' | Stadium: Lamphun Province Stadium; Attendance: 4,581; Referee: Peerasan Krataithong |

| 16 March 2025 26 | Buriram United | 5–0 | Nakhon Ratchasima Mazda | Buriram |
| | Goran Čaušić 14'; Phitiwat Sukjitthammakul 38'; Guilherme Bissoli 51'; Martin Boakye 67'; Narubadin Weerawatnodom 78'; Lucas Crispim (yellow card) 45+4' | | Ratthasart Bangsungnoen (yellow card) 90'; Supawit Romphopak (yellow card) 90+6' | Stadium: Chang Arena; Attendance: 10,168; Referee: Sivakorn Pu-udom |

| 29 March 2025 27 | Buriram United | 2–1 | Rayong | Buriram |
| | Lucas Crispim 45+9' (pen.); Suphanat Mueanta 87'; Ratthanakorn Maikami (yellow card) 90+5' | | Stênio Júnior 56' (penalty missed) 32 | Stadium: Chang Arena; Attendance: 10,438; Referee: Ekkachai Phetcham |

| 6 April 2025 28 | Sukhothai | 1–2 | Buriram United | Sukhothai |
| | Hikaru Matsui 90+2'; Tassanapong Muaddarak (yellow card) 61'; Jakkit Wachpirom (yellow card) 75'; Claudio (yellow card) 82' | | Suphanat Mueanta 50'; Martin Boakye 65'; Narubadin Weerawatnodom (yellow card) 61' | Stadium: Thalay Luang Stadium; Attendance: 6,095; Referee: Noppadet Mangngam |

| 19 April 2025 29 | Ratchaburi | 3–2 | Buriram United | Ratchaburi |
| | Jakkaphan Kaewprom 29'; Njiva Rakotoharimalala 33' (yellow card) 90'; Chotipat Poomkaew 90+5'; Jonathan Khemdee (yellow card) 21'; Kim Ji-min (yellow card) 35' | | Guilherme Bissoli 42' (pen.); Supachai Chaided 59'; Sasalak Haiprakhon (yellow card) 70'; Dion Cools (yellow card) 73' | Stadium: Dragon Solar Park; Attendance: 9,458; Referee: Songkran Bunmeekiart |

| 30 April 2025 30 (Rescheduled) | Buriram United | 7–0 | Nongbua Pitchaya | Buriram |
| | Phitiwat Sukjitthammakul 26'; Guilherme Bissoli 47', 61'; Pansa Hemviboon 55'; Lucas Crispim 26'; Martin Boakye 79', 82'; Kenny Dougall (yellow card) 67'; Jefferson Tabinas (yellow card) 40'; Kim Min-hyeok (yellow card) 89' | | Norraseth Lukthong (yellow card) 77' | Stadium: Chang Arena; Referee: Kim Hee-gon (South Korea) |

=== Thai FA Cup ===
Win Draw Loss

| 19 November 2024 Round of 64 | (T3) Roi Et PB United | 0–4 | Buriram United | Roi Et |
| | Natan (yellow card) 40'; Sudhkat Phomduang (yellow card) 73' | | Kenny Dougall 18'; Guilherme Bissoli 36'; Jefferson Tabinas 58'; Supachai Chaided 87' | Stadium: Roi Et Province Stadium; Attendance: 2,500; Referee: Sarayut Jakngoen |

| 18 December 2024 Round of 32 (Rescheduled) | (T2) Mahasarakham | 0–5 | Buriram United | Maha Sarakham |
| | Kittipong Wongma (yellow card) 16'; Suwit Paipromrat (yellow card) 30'; Anuwat Phikulsri (yellow card) 80'; Leandro Assumpção (yellow card) 87'; Evson (yellow card) 88' | | Guilherme Bissoli 38', 45+3', 63'; Supachai Chaided 67'; Athit Berg 74' | Stadium: Mahasarakham Province Stadium; Attendance: 4,535; Referee: Jirawit Phonkaew |

| 9 April 2025 Round of 16 | Buriram United | 2–1 (a.e.t.) | Singha Chiangrai United | Buriram |
| | Dion Cools 42'; Goran Čaušić 111' (pen.); Martin Boakye (penalty missed) 93 (yellow card) 114'; Suphanat Mueanta (yellow card) 116' | | Jordan Emaviwe 17'; Thanawat Pimyotha (yellow card) 32'; Ralph (yellow card) 78'; Anukran Thinjo (yellow card) 87'; Carlos Iury (yellow card) 90+3' (yellow-red card); Juli0 Cesar (yellow card) 90+7'; Apirak Woravong (yellow card) 101' | Stadium: Chang Arena; Attendance: 8,933; Referee: Thapakorn Thongkon |

| 3 May 2025 Quarter-final (Rescheduled) | (T2) Chanthaburi | 0–1 | Buriram United | Chanthaburi |
| | Santitorn Lattirom (yellow card) 20'; Thanachai Nathanakool (yellow card) 40'; Bienvenido Marañón (yellow card) 66'; Naphat Jaruphatphakdee (yellow card) 72'; Somkid Chamnarnsilp (yellow card) 87'; Aphiwat Hanchai (yellow card) 87' (yellow-red card) | | Guilherme Bissoli 57'; Nathakorn Rattanasuwan (yellow card) 82' | Stadium: Chanthaburi Provincial Stadium; Attendance: 6,279; Referee: Wiwat Jumpaoon |

| 10 May 2025 Semi-final | Buriram United | 3–0 | BG Pathum United | Ratchaburi |
| | Jefferson Tabinas 47'; Goran Čaušić 54'; Supachai Chaided 75' | | Dion Cools (yellow card) 42' | Stadium: Dragon Solar Park; Attendance: 4,484; Referee: Choi Hyun-Jae (South Korea) |

| 24 May 2025 Final | Muangthong United | 2–3 | Buriram United | Pathum Thani |
| | Poramet Arjvirai 45+5' (pen.), 72' | | Guilherme Bissoli 27' (pen.), 51'; Goran Čaušić 35'; Kenny Dougall (yellow card) 19'; Supachai Chaided (yellow card) 40'; Phitiwat Sukjitthammakul (yellow card) 59'; Neil Etheridge (yellow card) 79' | Stadium: Thammasat Stadium; Attendance: 16,370; Referee: Wang Di (China) |

=== Thai League Cup ===
| 30 October 2024 Round of 32 | (T2) Lampang | 1–2 | Buriram United | Lampang |
| | Mehti Sarakham 37'; Rakpong Chumueang (yellow card) 22'; Mehti Sarakham (yellow card) 31'; Judivan (yellow card) 45+1'; Kim Seong-soo (yellow card) 81' | | Dion Cools 45+4'; Supachai Chaided 78'; Kim Min-hyeok (yellow card) 57' | Stadium: Lampang Province Stadium; Attendance: 3,589; Referee: Noppadet Mangngam |

| 26 February 2025 Round of 16 | Buriram United | 3–1 | BG Pathum United | Buriram |
| | Martin Boakye 32'; Supachai Chaided 46'; Guilherme Bissoli 84' (pen.); Lucas Crispim (yellow card) 45+2'; Suphanat Mueanta (yellow card) 55' | | Raniel 75' (yellow card) 83'; Marco Ballini (yellow card) 9' | Stadium: Chang Arena; Attendance: 16,126; Referee: Sarayut Jakngoen |

| 16 April 2025 Quarter-final | Bangkok United | 1–2 (a.e.t.) | Buriram United | Pathum Thani |
| | Thitiphan Puangchan 90+6' (yellow card) 44'; Patiwat Khammai (yellow card) 40'; Everton (yellow card) 45+2'; Pratama Arhan (yellow card) 75' | | Peter Žulj 61'; Guilherme Bissoli 113'; Kenny Dougall (yellow card) 108'; Neil Etheridge (yellow card) 118' | Stadium: Thammasat Stadium; Attendance: 3,834; Referee: Sarayut Jakngoen |

| 18 May 2025 Semi-final | Nongbua Pitchaya | 0–7 | Buriram United | Bangkok |
| | | | Ratthanakorn Maikami 5'; Nathakorn Rattanasuwan 11', 13'; Martin Boakye 16', 58'; Seksan Ratree 79'; Guilherme Bissoli 89'; Go Myeong-Seok (yellow card) 37' | Stadium: PAT Stadium; Attendance: 1,944; Referee: Chae Sang-hyeop (South Korea) |

| 31 May 2025 Final | Lamphun Warriors | 0–2 | Buriram United | Pathum Thani |
| | Fabinho (red card) 4'; Korraphat Nareechan (yellow card) 66'; Anan Yodsangwal (yellow card) 80'; Witthaya Moonwong (yellow card) 80'; Victor Cardozo (yellow card) 90+7' | | Guilherme Bissoli 90+7' (pen.) (yellow card) 80'; Dion Cools 90+13' (yellow card) 64'; Martin Boakye (yellow card) 74'; Kenny Dougall (yellow card) 74'; Neil Etheridge (yellow card) 90+6' | Stadium: BG Stadium; Attendance: 10,019; Referee: Kim Woo-sung (South Korea) |

=== AFC Champions League Elite ===
==== Matches ====
Win Draw Loss

| Pos | Team | Pld | W | D | L | GF | GA | GD | Pts | Qualification |
|---|---|---|---|---|---|---|---|---|---|---|
| 4 | (South Korea) Gwangju | 7 | 4 | 2 | 1 | 15 | 9 | +6 | 14 | Advance to round of 16 |
| 5 | (Japan) Vissel Kobe | 7 | 4 | 1 | 2 | 14 | 9 | +5 | 13 | Advance to round of 16 |
| 6 | (Thailand) Buriram United | 8 | 3 | 3 | 2 | 7 | 12 | −5 | 12 | Advance to round of 16 |
| 7 | (China) Shanghai Shenhua | 8 | 3 | 1 | 4 | 13 | 12 | +1 | 10 | Advance to round of 16 |
| 8 | (China) Shanghai Port | 8 | 2 | 2 | 4 | 10 | 18 | −8 | 8 | Advance to round of 16 |

Source: Asian Football Confederation
Rules for classification: 1) points; 2) goal difference; 3) number of goals scored; 4) number of matches won; 5) penalty shoot-out if only two teams remain tied and played each other on the final matchday 6) fair play ranking; 7) drawing of lots

| 17 September 2024 Matchday 1 | Buriram United (Thailand) | 0–0 | (Japan) Vissel Kobe | Buriram, Thailand |
| 19:00 UTC+7 | Dion Cools (yellow card) 90+2' | Report | Takahiro Ogihara (yellow card) 64' | Stadium: Buriram Stadium; Attendance: 16,793; Referee: Muhammad Taqi (Singapore) |

| 1 October 2024 Matchday 2 | Central Coast Mariners (Australia) | 1–2 | (Thailand) Buriram United | Gosford, Australia |
| 18:00 UTC+10 | Lucas Mauragis 90+5'; Adam Pavlesic (red card) 57'; Alfie McCalmont (yellow card) 41' | Report | Guilherme Bissoli 30'; Curtis Good 50' | Stadium: Central Coast Stadium; Attendance: 3,483; Referee: Nazmi Nasaruddin (Malaysia) |

| 22 October 2024 Matchday 3 | Buriram United (Thailand) | 1–0 | (South Korea) Pohang Steelers | Buriram, Thailand |
| 19:00 UTC+7 | Guilherme Bissoli 56'; Kenny Dougall (yellow card) 19'; Osmar Loss (yellow card) 35'; Curtis Good (yellow card) 58' | Report | Lee Gyu-Baek (yellow card) 30' | Stadium: Buriram Stadium; Attendance: 25,206; Referee: Khalid Saleh Al-Turais (Saudi Arabia) |

| 6 November 2024 Matchday 4 | Yokohama F. Marinos (Japan) | 5–0 | (Thailand) Buriram United | Yokohama, Japan |
| 19:00 UTC+9 | Kenta Inoue 11'; Anderson Lopes 45+1' (pen.), 57'; Neil Etheridge 45+3' (o.g.); Asahi Uenaka 66' | Report | Sasalak Haiprakhon (red card) 27'; Dion Cools (yellow card) 68' | Stadium: International Stadium Yokohama; Attendance: 8,144; Referee: Ali Saeed Al Naqbi (United Arab Emirates) |

| 26 November 2024 Matchday 5 | Buriram United (Thailand) | 0–3 | (Japan) Kawasaki Frontale | Buriram, Thailand |
| 19:00 UTC+7 | Kenny Dougall (yellow card) 17'; Chrigor (yellow card) 87' | Report | Miura 79'; Tono 90+4'; Kanda 90+7'; Yuki Yamamoto (yellow card) 24' | Stadium: Buriram Stadium; Attendance: 16,902; Referee: Mohammed Al Hoaish (Saudi Arabia) |

| 3 December 2024 Matchday 6 | Johor Darul Ta'zim (Malaysia) | 0–0 | (Thailand) Buriram United | Johor, Malaysia |
| 20:00 UTC+8 | Juan Muñiz (yellow card) 4'; Murilo (red card) 13'; Park Jun-heong (red card) 90+4' | Report | Supachai Chaided (yellow card) 18'; Phitiwat Sukjitthammakul (yellow card) 27'; Theerathon Bunmathan (yellow card) 42' (red card) 45'; Neil Etheridge (yellow card) 54' | Stadium: Sultan Ibrahim Stadium; Attendance: 31,687; Referee: Khalid Saleh Al-Turais (Saudi Arabia) |

| 12 February 2025 Matchday 7 | Buriram United (Thailand) | 2–1 | (South Korea) Ulsan HD | Buriram Stadium, Buriram |
| 19:00 UTC+7 | Guilherme Bissoli 20'; Suphanat Mueanta 90+4'; Martin Boakye (yellow card) 28'; Peter Žulj (yellow card) 69' | Report | Jang Si-young 45'; Lee Gyu-Sung (yellow card) 26'; Yago Cariello (yellow card) 78'; Lee Jae-ik (yellow card) 88' | Attendance: 16,068; Referee: Alireza Faghani (Australia) |

| 18 February 2025 Matchday 8 | Gwangju (South Korea) | 2–2 | (Thailand) Buriram United | Yongin, South Korea |
| 19:00 UTC+9 | Oh Hoo-sung 68', 74'; Kim Jin-Ho (yellow card) 51' | Report | Guilherme Bissoli 13'; Martin Boakye 35' (yellow card) 64'; Supachai Chaided (yellow card) 77' | Stadium: Gwangju Football Stadium; Referee: Salman Falahi (Qatar) |

==== Knockout stage ====
| 4 March 2025 R16 Leg 1 | Buriram United (Thailand) | 0–0 | (Malaysia) Johor Darul Ta'zim | Buriram, Thailand |
| | Martin Boakye (yellow card) 48' | Report | Natxo Insa (yellow card) 27'; Óscar Arribas (yellow card) 52'; Eddy Israfilov (yellow card) 54'; Álvaro González (yellow card) 90+1' | Stadium: Buriram Stadium; Attendance: 22,207; Referee: Khalaf Al Shammari (Saudi Arabia) |

| 11 March 2025 R16 Leg 2 | Johor Darul Ta'zim (Malaysia) | 0–1 (0–1 agg.) | (Thailand) Buriram United | Johor, Malaysia |
| | Arif Aiman (yellow card) 51'; Samu Castillejo (yellow card) 90+3'; Natxo Insa (yellow card) 90+6'; Jorge Obregón (yellow card) 90+8' | Report | Suphanat Mueanta 58'; Peter Žulj (yellow card) 25'; Martin Boakye (yellow card) 48'; Curtis Good (yellow card) 56' | Stadium: Sultan Ibrahim Stadium; Referee: Ahmad Al-Ali (Kuwait) |

| 26 April 2025 Quarter Final | Al-Ahli (Saudi Arabia) | 3–0 | (Thailand) Buriram United | Jeddah, Saudi Arabia |
| | Riyad Mahrez 4'; Galeno 6'; Roberto Firmino 30' | Report | Sasalak Haiprakhon (yellow card) 45'; Rene Renner (yellow card) 78'; Supachai Chaided (yellow card) 88' | Stadium: King Abdullah Sports City; Referee: Ahmed Al-Kaf (Oman) |

=== ASEAN Club Championship ===
==== Group stage ====
| Pos | Team | Pld | W | D | L | GF | GA | GD | Pts | Qualification | CAH | BUR | KLC | BOR | LCS | KAY |
|---|---|---|---|---|---|---|---|---|---|---|---|---|---|---|---|---|
| 1 | (Vietnam) Cong An Hanoi | 5 | 5 | 0 | 0 | 15 | 6 | +9 | 15 | Advance to Semi-finals | | 2–1 | | 3–2 | 5–0 | |
| 2 | (Thailand) Buriram United | 5 | 3 | 1 | 1 | 13 | 2 | +11 | 10 | Advance to Semi-finals | | | 1–0 | 4–0 | | 7–0 |
| 3 | (Malaysia) Kuala Lumpur City | 5 | 2 | 0 | 3 | 4 | 6 | −2 | 6 (Note: Ranked on head-to-head points: Kuala Lumpur City (3); Borneo (0).) | | 2–3 | | | 1–0 | | 1–0 |
| 4 | (Indonesia) Borneo | 5 | 2 | 0 | 3 | 7 | 9 | −2 | 6 | | | | | | 3–0 | 2–1 |
| 5 | (Singapore) Lion City Sailors | 5 | 1 | 1 | 3 | 2 | 10 | −8 | 4 | | | 0–0 | 2–0 | | | |
| 6 | (Philippines) Kaya–Iloilo | 5 | 1 | 0 | 4 | 4 | 12 | −8 | 3 | | 1–2 | | | | 2–0 | |

Source: ASEAN United FC
Rules for classification: Tiebreakers
Notes:

| 22 August 2024 Matchday 1 | Cong An Ha Noi (Vietnam) | 2–1 | (Thailand) Buriram United | Hanoi |
| 19:30 UTC+7 | Văn Đức 3'; Grafite 66'; Hugo Gomes (yellow card) 89'; Nguyễn Văn Đức (yellow card) 90+6' | Report | Tabinas 49'; Matheus Vargas (yellow card) 22'; Pansa Hemviboon (yellow card) 58'; Athit Berg (yellow card) 78' | Stadium: Hàng Đẫy Stadium; Referee: Rustam Lutfullin (Uzbekistan) |

| 26 September 2024 Matchday 2 | Buriram United (Thailand) | 7–0 | (Philippines) Kaya—Iloilo | Buriram |
| 19:00 UTC+7 | Lucas Crispim 9', 50', 53'; Supachai Chaided 15'; Athit Berg 77'; Seksan Ratree 84'; Chrigor 90+1' (pen.); Curtis Good (yellow card) 88' | Report | Patrick Deyto (yellow card) 89' | Stadium: Chang Arena; Referee: Rustam Lutfullin (Uzbekistan) |

| 9 January 2025 Matchday 3 | Buriram United (Thailand) | 4–0 | (Indonesia) Borneo | Buriram |
| 19:30 UTC+7 | Lucas Crispim 25'; Guilherme Bissoli 27'; Marcelo Djaló 45+2'; Ratthanakorn Maikami 87' | Report | Komang Teguh (yellow card) 74' | Stadium: Chang Arena; Referee: Hiroki Kasahara (Japan) |

| 23 January 2025 Matchday 4 | Lion City Sailors (Singapore) | 0–0 | (Thailand) Buriram United | Kallang |
| 19:30 UTC+8 | | Report | Sasalak Haiprakhon (yellow card) 34'; Kenny Dougall (red card) 42' | Stadium: Jalan Besar Stadium; Referee: Omar Al-Yaqoubi (Oman) |

| 6 February 2025 Matchday 5 | Buriram United (Thailand) | 1–0 | (Malaysia) Kuala Lumpur City | Buriram |
| 19:30 UTC+7 | Lucas Crispim 37'; Chatchai Budprom (yellow card) 45' | Report | Patrick Reichelt (yellow card) 45'; Giancarlo Gallifuoco (yellow card) 45+2' | Stadium: Chang Arena; Referee: Koji Takasaki (Japan) |

==== Semi-final ====
| 2 April 2025 Leg 1 | Buriram United (Thailand) | 3–1 | (Thailand) BG Pathum United | Buriram |
| | Supachai Chaided 24'; Pansa Hemviboon 57'; Guilherme Bissoli 74'; Phitiwat Sukjitthammakul (yellow card) 28'; Dion Cools (yellow card) 90+3' | | Ilhan Fandi 54' | Stadium: Buriram City Stadium; Referee: Choi Hyun-Jae (South Korea) |

| 7 May 2025 Leg 2 | BG Pathum United (Thailand) | 0–0 (1–3 agg.) | (Thailand) Buriram United | Pathum Thani |
| | | | | Stadium: BG Stadium; Referee: Hiroki Kasahara (Japan) |

==== Final ====
| 14 May 2025 Leg 1 | Cong An Hanoi (Vietnam) | 2–2 | (Thailand) Buriram United | Hanoi |
| | Léo Artur 18'; Alan Grafite 35'; Nguyen Quang Hai (yellow card) 45+4'; Tran Dình Trong (yellow card) 68' | Report | Curtis Good 28'; Peter Žulj 78' (yellow card) 53'; Theerathon Bunmathan (yellow card) 42'; Guilherme Bissoli (yellow card) 52' | Stadium: Hàng Đẫy Stadium; Attendance: 13,879; Referee: Kim Hee-Gon (South Korea) |

| 21 May 2025 Leg 2 | Buriram United (Thailand) | 3–3 (a.e.t.) (5–5 agg.) (3–2 p) | (Vietnam) Cong An Hanoi | Buriram |
| | Peter Žulj 83'; Lucas Crispim 90+8' (yellow card) 90+4'; Guilherme Bissoli 105' (pen.); Theerathon Bunmathan (yellow card) 7'; Lê Phạm Thành Long (yellow card) 5'; Pansa Hemviboon (yellow card) 45'; Chatchai Budprom (yellow card) 112' | Report | Jason Pendant 15'; Léo Artur 36' (pen.); Alan Grafite 118' (yellow card) 78'; Lê Phạm Thành Long (yellow card) 5'; Nguyen Quang Hai (yellow card) 45'; Hugo Gomes (yellow card) 54'; Lê Văn Đô (yellow card) 82'; Filip Nguyen (yellow card) 90+4' | Stadium: Chang Arena; Attendance: 31,290; Referee: Koji Takasaki (Japan) |
| | Penalties |
| | Peter Žulj (penalty scored); Lucas Crispim (penalty scored); Martin Boakye (penalty missed); Phitiwat Sukjitthammakul (penalty scored); Kenny Dougall (penalty missed) | | (penalty scored) Lê Văn Đô; (penalty missed) Jason Pendant; (penalty missed) Hugo Gomes; (penalty scored) Alan Grafite; (penalty missed) Bui Hoang Viet Anh |

== Statistics ==
=== Appearances and goals ===
As of 31 May 2025

| No. | Pos. | Player | Thai League | | FA Cup | | League Cup | | AFC Champions League Elite | | ASEAN Club Championship | | Total | |
| No. | Pos. | Player | Apps. | Goals | Apps. | Goals | Apps. | Goals | Apps. | Goals | Apps. | Goals | Apps. | Goals |
|---|---|---|---|---|---|---|---|---|---|---|---|---|---|---|
| 1 | GK | (Thailand) Siwarak Tedsungnoen | 0 | 0 | 1 | 0 | 1 | 0 | 0+1 | 0 | 2 | 0 | 5 | 0 |
| 2 | MF | (Thailand) Sasalak Haiprakhon | 16+8 | 2 | 3+1 | 0 | 4+1 | 0 | 4+3 | 0 | 6+1 | 0 | 47 | 2 |
| 3 | DF | (Thailand) Pansa Hemviboon | 14+3 | 3 | 1+4 | 0 | 1+1 | 0 | 1 | 0 | 6+2 | 1 | 32 | 4 |
| 4 | MF | (Thailand) (England) Leon James | 0+3 | 0 | 0 | 0 | 0 | 0 | 0 | 0 | 0+1 | 0 | 4 | 0 |
| 5 | MF | (Thailand) Theerathon Bunmathan | 18+2 | 1 | 4 | 0 | 3 | 0 | 7 | 0 | 7 | 0 | 41 | 1 |
| 6 | DF | (Australia) Curtis Good | 0 | 0 | 3+1 | 0 | 2+2 | 0 | 9 | 1 | 8 | 1 | 25 | 2 |
| 7 | MF | (Brazil) Guilherme Bissoli | 25+5 | 25 | 4+2 | 7 | 3+2 | 4 | 9+2 | 4 | 9 | 3 | 61 | 43 |
| 8 | FW | (Thailand) Ratthanakorn Maikami | 3+16 | 2 | 2+4 | 0 | 1+3 | 1 | 1+1 | 0 | 1+8 | 1 | 40 | 3 |
| 9 | FW | (Thailand) Supachai Chaided | 25+3 | 10 | 4+2 | 3 | 4 | 2 | 6+4 | 0 | 9 | 2 | 57 | 16 |
| 10 | FW | (Brazil) Lucas Crispim | 21+5 | 9 | 2 | 0 | 4+1 | 0 | 10+1 | 0 | 7 | 5 | 51 | 14 |
| 11 | DF | (Malaysia) (Belgium) Dion Cools | 23+3 | 1 | 4+1 | 1 | 4 | 2 | 11 | 0 | 5+1 | 0 | 52 | 4 |
| 13 | GK | (Philippines) (England) Neil Etheridge | 30 | 0 | 3 | 0 | 4 | 0 | 11 | 0 | 0 | 0 | 48 | 0 |
| 15 | DF | (Thailand) Narubadin Weerawatnodom | 8+9 | 1 | 2 | 0 | 0+1 | 0 | 0+2 | 0 | 3 | 0 | 25 | 1 |
| 16 | DF | (Thailand) (Australia) Kenny Dougall | 29+1 | 0 | 6 | 1 | 5 | 0 | 10 | 0 | 4 | 0 | 55 | 1 |
| 18 | FW | (Thailand) (Norway) Athit Berg | 0+9 | 1 | 3+2 | 1 | 0+3 | 0 | 0 | 0 | 0+5 | 1 | 22 | 3 |
| 20 | DF | (Guinea-Bissau) (Spain) Marcelo Djaló | 13+7 | 0 | 0 | 0 | 0 | 0 | 2+2 | 0 | 4 | 1 | 28 | 1 |
| 21 | FW | (Thailand) Suphanat Mueanta | 7+5 | 9 | 0+1 | 0 | 2 | 0 | 4 | 2 | 1 | 0 | 20 | 11 |
| 22 | DF | (South Korea) Ko Myeong-seok | 0 | 0 | 4 | 0 | 4 | 0 | 5 | 0 | 2 | 0 | 15 | 0 |
| 23 | MF | (Serbia) Goran Čaušić | 14 | 4 | 4+1 | 3 | 0 | 0 | 9+1 | 0 | 0 | 0 | 29 | 7 |
| 27 | MF | (Thailand) Phitiwat Sukjitthammakul | 22+4 | 2 | 4+2 | 0 | 4+1 | 0 | 2+4 | 0 | 7+2 | 0 | 52 | 2 |
| 28 | DF | (Thailand) (Australia) Maxx Creevey | 0+2 | 0 | 0 | 0 | 0 | 0 | 0 | 0 | 0 | 0 | 2 | 0 |
| 34 | GK | (Thailand) Chatchai Budprom | 0 | 0 | 2 | 0 | 0 | 0 | 0 | 0 | 7 | 0 | 12 | 0 |
| 35 | GK | (Thailand) Kittipong Boonmak | 0 | 0 | 0 | 0 | 0 | 0 | 0 | 0 | 0 | 0 | 0 | 0 |
| 37 | DF | (Austria) Rene Renner | 0 | 0 | 0 | 0 | 0 | 0 | 1 | 0 | 2 | 0 | 3 | 0 |
| 40 | DF | (Philippines) (Japan) Jefferson Tabinas | 19+9 | 2 | 4 | 2 | 2+2 | 0 | 2+5 | 0 | 2+1 | 1 | 46 | 5 |
| 44 | MF | (Austria) Peter Žulj | 0 | 0 | 2+1 | 0 | 2 | 1 | 4 | 0 | 4 | 2 | 13 | 3 |
| 45 | FW | (Italy) (Ghana) Martin Boakye | 7+7 | 8 | 2+1 | 0 | 3+1 | 3 | 5 | 1 | 1 | 0 | 27 | 12 |
| 50 | DF | (Thailand) Singha Marasa | 0 | 0 | 0 | 0 | 0 | 0 | 0 | 0 | 0 | 0 | 0 | 0 |
| 54 | FW | (Thailand) Nathakorn Rattanasuwan | 0 | 0 | 2 | 0 | 1 | 2 | 0 | 0 | 0 | 0 | 3 | 2 |
| 70 | MF | (Thailand) Jirapong Puengviravong | 0 | 0 | 0 | 0 | 0 | 0 | 0 | 0 | 0 | 0 | 0 | 0 |
| 75 | GK | (Thailand) Phumworraphon Wannabutr | 0 | 0 | 0+1 | 0 | 0 | 0 | 0 | 0 | 0 | 0 | 1 | 0 |
| 89 | MF | (Thailand) Pongsakron Hanrattana | 0 | 0 | 0 | 0 | 0 | 0 | 0 | 0 | 0 | 0 | 0 | 0 |
| 92 | DF | (South Korea) Kim Min-hyeok | 25+4 | 0 | 0 | 0 | 1 | 0 | 7+1 | 0 | 1 | 0 | 39 | 0 |
| 95 | MF | (Thailand) Seksan Ratree | 1+9 | 1 | 0+2 | 0 | 0+2 | 1 | 1 | 0 | 0+6 | 1 | 21 | 3 |
| ?? | MF | (Thailand) Thanakrit Chotmuangpak | 0+2 | 0 | 0+1 | 0 | 0 | 0 | 0 | 0 | 0 | 0 | 3 | 0 |
| ?? | FW | (Thailand) (England) Caelan Tanadon Ryan | 0 | 0 | 0 | 0 | 0 | 0 | 0 | 0 | 0 | 0 | 0 | 0 |
Players who have played but left on loan
| 17 | DF | (Thailand) (Cyprus) Charalampos Charalampous | 0+1 | 0 | 0 | 0 | 0 | 0 | 0 | 0 | 0+1 | 0 | 2 | 0 |
| 19 | FW | (Brazil) Chrigor | 4+9 | 7 | 0 | 0 | 1 | 0 | 0+6 | 0 | 0+2 | 1 | 22 | 8 |
| 48 | DF | (Thailand) Wanthayawut Nutkrasae | 0 | 0 | 0 | 0 | 0 | 0 | 0 | 0 | 0 | 0 | 0 | 0 |
| 49 | MF | (Thailand) Piyawat Petra | 0 | 0 | 0 | 0 | 0 | 0 | 0 | 0 | 0 | 0 | 0 | 0 |
| 91 | FW | (Thailand) (Netherlands) Phumin William Boers | 0 | 0 | 0 | 0 | 0 | 0 | 0 | 0 | 0 | 0 | 0 | 0 |
| 96 | MF | (Brazil) Matheus Vargas | 3+5 | 0 | 0 | 0 | 0 | 0 | 1+3 | 0 | 1 | 0 | 13 | 0 |
