= Martin Boakye =

Italian association football player

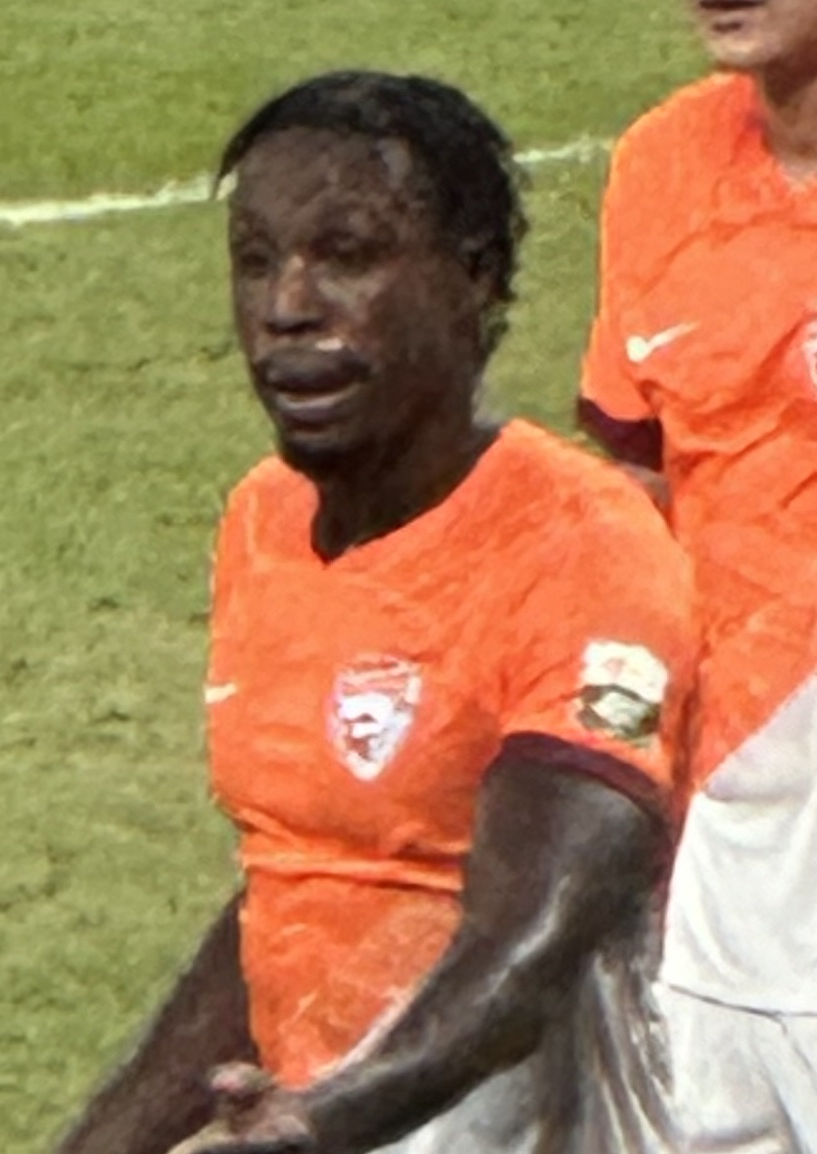
- Boakye in August 2024

Personal information
- Date of birth: 10 February 1995 (age 31)
- Place of birth: Valdagno, Italy
- Height: 1.91 m (6 ft 3 in)
- Position: Forward

Team information
- Current team: Andijon
- Number: 27

Youth career
- Ponte dei Nori
- –2016: Solesinese

Senior career*
Years	Team	Apps	(Gls)
2016	Kitzbühel	14	(4)
2016–2017	Hohenems	28	(9)
2017–2019	Kitzbühel	58	(29)
2019–2020	Jeunesse Esch	16	(8)
2020–2021	Slaven Belupo	10	(1)
2021	Andijon	12	(2)
2021–2023	AGMK	64	(22)
2024	Qingdao Hainiu	29	(10)
2025	Buriram United	15	(8)
2025	Boluspor	18	(2)
2026–	Andijon	12	(2)
- * Club domestic league appearances and goals as of 29 July 2026

Martin Boakye (born 10 February 1995) is an Italian professional footballer who plays as a forward for Uzbekistan Super League club Andijon.

== Career ==
Boakye played for USD Ponte dei Nori and UCD Solesinese in his native Italy before joining Austrian Regionalliga side Kitzbühel in 2016. After three years in Austria, he joined Luxembourg National Division side Jeunesse Esch. On 9 August 2020, it was announced that Boakye had signed for Croatian First Football League side Slaven Belupo. A week later, he made his professional league debut, starting in a 0–0 draw with Osijek. On 4 January 2021, Boakye terminated this contract mutually with Slaven Belupo.

On 6 February 2024, Boakye joined Chinese Super League club Qingdao Hainiu.

== Career statistics ==
As of match played 29 July 2026

Appearances and goals by club, season and competition
Club	Season	League			National cup (Note: Includes Austrian Cup, Luxembourg Cup, Uzbekistan Cup, Chinese FA Cup, Thai FA Cup, Turkish Cup)		League cup (Note: Includes Thai League Cup)		Continental		Other		Total	
Club	Season	Division	Apps	Goals	Apps	Goals	Apps	Goals	Apps	Goals	Apps	Goals	Apps	Goals
Kitzbühel	2015–16	Austrian Regionalliga	14	4	0	0	–		–		–		14	4
Hohenems	2016–17	Austrian Regionalliga	28	9	1	0	–		–		–		29	9
Kitzbühel	2017–18	Austrian Regionalliga	29	15	1	0	–		–		–		30	15
Kitzbühel	2018–19	Austrian Regionalliga	29	14	1	0	–		–		–		30	14
Kitzbühel	Total		58	29	2	0	–		–		–		60	29
Jeunesse Esch	2019–20	Luxembourg National Division	16	8	1	2	–		–		–		17	10
Slaven Belupo	2020–21	Prva HNL	10	1	0	0	–		–		–		10	1
Andijon	2021	Uzbekistan Super League	12	2	1	0	–		–		–		13	2
AGMK	2021	Uzbekistan Super League	14	4	3	3	–		–		–		17	7
AGMK	2022	Uzbekistan Super League	25	12	6	0	–		–		–		31	12
AGMK	2023	Uzbekistan Super League	25	6	5	5	–		7 (Note: Appearances in AFC Champions League)	2	–		37	13
AGMK	Total		64	22	14	8	–		7	2	–		85	32
Qingdao Hainiu	2024	Chinese Super League	29	10	1	0	–		–		–		30	10
Buriram United	2024–25	Thai League 1	15	8	2	0	4	3	5 (Note: Appearances in AFC Champions League Elite)	1	1 (Note: Appearance in ASEAN Club Championship)	0	27	12
Boluspor	2025—26	TFF 1. Lig	18	2	1	1	–		–		–		19	3
Andijon	2026	Uzbekistan Super League	12	2	0	0	–		–		–		12	2
Career total			266	97	32	11	4	3	12	3	1	0	306	116

== Personal life ==
Born in Italy, Boakye is of Ghanaian descent; he is the second born of three children, having an older and a younger sister, called Mavis Ntim Boakye and Jessica Boakye.

== Honours ==
Buriram United

- Thai League 1: 2024–25
- Thai FA Cup: 2024–25
- Thai League Cup: 2024–25
- ASEAN Club Championship: 2024–25
