= Thanakrit Chotmuangpak =

Thai footballer (born 2006)

Personal information
- Full name: Thanakrit Chotmuangpak
- Date of birth: 1 September 2006 (age 20)
- Place of birth: Nakhon Ratchasima, Thailand
- Height: 1.68 m (5 ft 6 in)
- Positions: Attacking midfielder; winger

Team information
- Current team: Buriram United
- Number: 33

Youth career
- 2015–2023: Buriram United

Senior career*
Years	Team	Apps	(Gls)
2023–	Buriram United	31	(5)

International career^{‡}
2023	Thailand U17	1	(0)
2024–2025	Thailand U20	13	(1)
2025–	Thailand U23	11	(2)
Medal record
Men's football
Representing Thailand
ASEAN U-19 Boys Championship
Runner-up	2024 Indonesia	Team
- * Club domestic league appearances and goals as of 22 March 2026 ‡ National team caps and goals as of 28 March 2026

Thanakrit Chotmuangpak (Thai: ธนกฤต โชติเมืองปัก; born 1 September 2006) is a Thai professional footballer who plays as an attacking midfielder or a winger for Thai League 1 club Buriram United.

== Club career ==
Thanakrit was a youth product of Buriram United. In June 2023, he was chosen by the club to come train with Leicester City alongside three other teammates during a period of three months, which eventually made him missed the 2023 AFC U-17 Asian Cup. After return from England, he was promoted to the first team for the 2023–24 Thai League 1. He made his professional debut on 15 September 2023 in the team's 4–0 home victory against Trat.

He started his first league match in a home game against Uthai Thani on 23 December 2023, providing two assists to help his team win 4–0. Thanakrit made one appearance in the 2023–24 AFC Champions League, starting in the last group stage game against Ventforet Kofu in a 3–2 home defeat. With an impressive performance by providing an assist in his team's 2–1 win against Lamphun Warriors, he was named as the best player of Matchweek 16 of the 2023–24 Thai League 1.

== International career ==
Thanakrit represented Thailand in the youth level, having played for Thailand U16, Thailand U20 and Thailand U23.

== Career statistics ==
=== Club ===
As of 22 March 2026

Appearances and goals by club, season and competition
Club	Season	League			Cup		League Cup		Continental		Other		Total	
Club	Season	Division	Apps	Goals	Apps	Goals	Apps	Goals	Apps	Goals	Apps	Goals	Apps	Goals
Buriram United	2023–24	Thai League 1	19	2	2	0	4	1	1 (Note: Appearances in the AFC Champions League)	0	0	0	26	3
Buriram United	2024–25	Thai League 1	2	0	1	0	0	0	0	0	—		3	0
Buriram United	2025–26	Thai League 1	10	3	3	3	3	1	0	0	2 (Note: Appearances in the ASEAN Club Championship)	0	18	7
Career total			31	5	6	3	7	2	1	0	2	0	47	10

== Honours ==
Buriram United

- Thai League 1: 2023–24, 2024–25, 2025–26
