= Jefferson Tabinas =

Filipino footballer (born 1998)

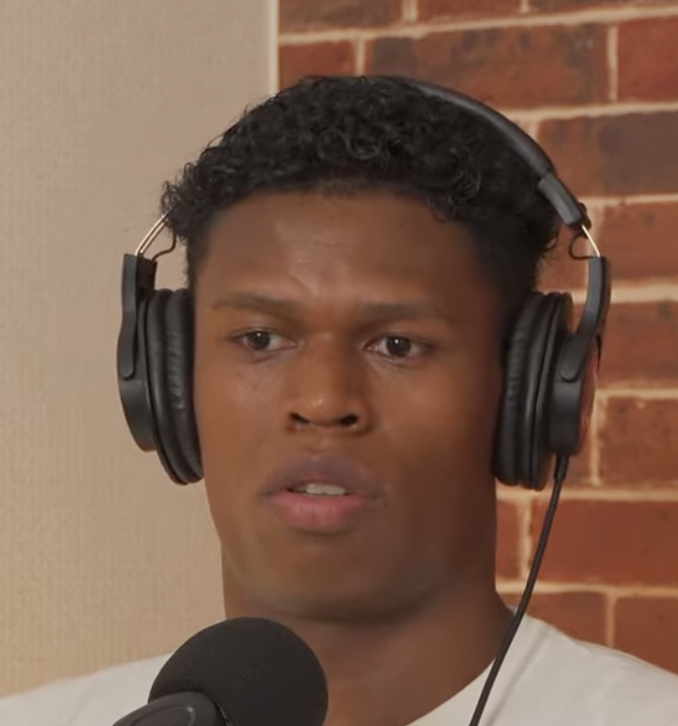

Personal information
- Full name: Jefferson David Tabinas
- Date of birth: August 7, 1998 (age 28)
- Place of birth: Shinjuku, Japan
- Height: 1.83 m (6 ft 0 in)
- Positions: Left-back; centre-back

Team information
- Current team: Selangor
- Number: 40

Youth career
- FC Waseda
- FC Toripletta
- 2014–2016: Toko Gakuen High School

Senior career*
Years	Team	Apps	(Gls)
2017–2020	Kawasaki Frontale	0	(0)
2019	→ FC Gifu (loan)	8	(0)
2020	→ Gamba Osaka U-23 (loan)	30	(0)
2021–2023	Mito HollyHock	74	(2)
2024–2025	Buriram United	43	(3)
2025–2026	→ Chonburi (loan)	27	(1)
2026–	Selangor	3	(1)

International career^{‡}
2021–	Philippines	28	(6)
- * Club domestic league appearances and goals as of 6 September 2026 ‡ National team caps and goals as of 9 June 2026

Jefferson David Tabinas (Japanese: タビナス ジェファーソン; born August 7, 1998) is a professional footballer who plays as a left-back or a centre-back for Malaysia Super League club Selangor. Born in Japan, he plays for the Philippines national team.

== Club career ==
=== Youth career ===
Born in Japan, Tabinas spent his youth with Waseda and Toripletta before studying at Toko Gakuen High School, for which he played and was named captain in his third high school year.

=== Kawasaki Frontale ===
After the high school tournament, Tabinas was signed by J1 League club Kawasaki Frontale for the 2017 season. Kawasaki Frontale won the 2017 and 2018 seasons of the J1 League, but Tabinas had no appearances for the team.

==== Loan to Gifu ====
In the 2019 season, he was loaned out to Gifu of the J2 League. He made his first J.League appearance in a match against Ehime on 7 April, where they lost 2–0. He made his Emperor's Cup debut when they entered in the second round on 3 July and were eliminated by Ventforet Kofu. Tabinas made seven more league appearances, however, the club finished at the bottom of the table and were relegated.

==== Loan to Gamba Osaka U23 ====
Tabinas spent the 2020 season on loan with Gamba Osaka U-23 in the J3 League.

=== Mito HollyHock ===
In January 2021, Tabinas transferred to Mito HollyHock of the J2 League. He scored his first J.League goal in a 2–2 draw with Renofa Yamaguchi on 17 October.

=== Buriram United ===
On 7 January 2024, Tabinas moved to Thai League 1 giants Buriram United. He made his debut in a 2–1 league win against Lamphun Warriors on 11 February. Tabinas provided an assist to Supachai Chaided which saw his club coming back from 2–0 down to a 3–2 home win against Bangkok United on 3 March. He scored his first goal for the club in a 3–1 win against Muangthong United on 27 April.

In the 2024–25 season, Tabinas make a total of 46 appearances for the club scoring 5 goals and 7 assists.

==== Loan to Chonburi ====
On 5 June 2025, Tabinas joined Chonburi on loan for the 2025–26 Thai League 1 season.

=== Selangor ===
On 1 July 2026, Tabinas transferred to Malaysia Super League team Selangor. He was praised for his high-level competitive experience in Thailand and Japan, which manager Kim Pan-gon hoped would bring significant value and quality to the squad.

On 6 September 2026, playing with ten men, Tabinas scored the winning goal in a 3–2 victory against Melaka.

== International career ==
Born in Japan to a Ghanaian father and a Filipino mother, Tabinas was eligible to present Japan, Ghana or Philippines at international level.

In 2016, Tabinas expressed his desire to represent Japan at the 2020 Tokyo Olympics.

=== Philippines ===
In May 2021, he was called up to the Philippines national team for the joint qualifiers of the 2022 FIFA World Cup and 2023 AFC Asian Cup. He made his debut on 7 June in a 0–2 defeat to China PR in Sharjah, UAE.

Tabinas scored his first international goal against Malaysia on 4 September 2024 during the 2024 Merdeka Tournament at the Bukit Jalil National Stadium.

== International goals ==
No.	Date	Venue	Opponent	Score	Result	Competition
1.	4 September 2024	Bukit Jalil National Stadium, Kuala Lumpur, Malaysia	Malaysia	1–0	1–2	2024 Merdeka Tournament
2.	14 October 2024	Tinsulanon Stadium, Songkhla, Thailand	Tajikistan	2–0	3–0	2024 King's Cup
3.	25 March 2025	New Clark City Athletics Stadium, Capas, Philippines	Maldives	1–0	4–1	2027 AFC Asian Cup qualification
4	14 October 2025	New Clark City Athletics Stadium, Capas, Philippines	Timor-Leste	1–1	3–1	2027 AFC Asian Cup qualification
5.	18 November 2025	National Football Stadium, Malé, Maldives	Maldives	1–0	2–0	2027 AFC Asian Cup qualification
6.	9 June 2026	Rizal Memorial Stadium, Manila, Philippines	Myanmar	1–0	5–1	Friendly

== Personal life ==
Tabinas was born in Japan to a Ghanaian father and Filipino mother. His younger brother, Paul, is also a footballer.

== Honours ==
Kawasaki Frontale

- J1 League: 2017, 2018

Buriram United

- Thai League 1: 2023–24, 2024–25
- Thai FA Cup: 2024–25
- Thai League Cup: 2024–25
- ASEAN Club Championship: 2024–25
