= Athit Berg =

Thai-Norwegian footballer (born 1998)

Personal information
- Full name: Athit Stephen Berg
- Date of birth: 11 January 1998 (age 28)
- Place of birth: Oslo, Norway
- Height: 1.72 m (5 ft 8 in)
- Positions: Attacking midfielder; forward

Team information
- Current team: Lamphun Warriors

Youth career
- 2013–2016: Stabæk
- 2017: Bærum
- 2017: Lyn

College career
Years	Team	Apps	(Gls)
2018	St. John's	14	(0)
2020–2021	UNC Wilmington	29	(5)

Senior career*
Years	Team	Apps	(Gls)
2015–2016	Stabæk 2	29	(0)
2017	Bærum	1	(0)
2017–2018	Lyn	6	(0)
2018–2019	Ready	18	(1)
2022–2024	Nakhon Pathom United	78	(13)
2024–2026	Buriram United	9	(1)
2026	→ Port (loan)	2	(0)
2026–	Lamphun Warriors	0	(0)

International career^{‡}
2014	Norway U16		
2023–	Thailand	2	(0)
- * Club domestic league appearances and goals as of 01:41, 25 December 2025 (UTC) ‡ National team caps and goals as of 12 October 2023

Athit Berg (Thai: อาทิตย์ เบิร์ก; born 11 January 1998) is a professional footballer who plays as a forward or an attacking midfielder for Thai League 1 club Lamphun Warriors. Born in Norway, he plays for Thailand internationally.

== International career ==
On 12 October 2023, Athit Berg made his first international debut, coming on against Georgia national football team as a substitution for Bordin Phala at the Mikheil Meskhi Stadium.

== Career statistics ==
=== Club ===
Club	Season	League		FA-Cup		League Cup		Total	
Club	Season	Apps	Goals	Apps	Goals	Apps	Goals	Apps	Goals
Stabæk 2	2015	12	0	—				12	0
Stabæk 2	2016	17	0	—				17	0
Total		29	0	0	0	—		29	0
Bærum	2017	1	0	1	0			2	0
Total		1	0	1	0	—		2	0
Lyn	2017	5	0	0	0			5	0
Lyn	2018	1	0	1	0			2	0
Total		6	0	1	0	—		7	0
Ready	2018	10	1	0	0			10	1
Total		10	0	0	0	—		10	0
Red Storm	2018	14	0					14	0
Total		14	0	0	0	—		14	0
Ready	2019	8	0	0	0			8	0
Total		8	0	0	0	—		8	0
UNC Wilmington	2020								
UNC Wilmington	2021								
Total		0	0	0	0	—		0	0
Nakhon Pathom United	2021–22	18	4	0	0	0	0	18	4
Nakhon Pathom United	2022–23	33	4	1	0	3	1	37	5
Nakhon Pathom United	2023–24	25	5	0	0	0	0	25	5
Total		76	13	1	0	3	1	80	14
Career total		144	14	3	0	3	1	150	15

== Honours ==
Buriram United

- Thai League 1: 2024–25
- Thai FA Cup: 2024–25
- Thai League Cup: 2024–25
- ASEAN Club Championship: 2024–25

Port

- Thai League Cup: 2025–26
