= Maxx Creevey =

Australian soccer player (born 1995)

Personal information
- Full name: Maxx Peter Creevey
- Date of birth: 28 April 1995 (age 31)
- Place of birth: Sydney, Australia
- Height: 1.85 m (6 ft 1 in)
- Positions: Centre back; left back

Team information
- Current team: Rayong (on loan from Buriram United)
- Number: 28

Youth career
- 2009–2012: Sutherland Sharks
- 2013–2016: Buriram United

Senior career*
Years	Team	Apps	(Gls)
2016–2024	Buriram United	1	(0)
2016	→ Khon Kaen United (loan)	14	(0)
2017	→ Samut Songkhram (loan)	17	(0)
2018–2019	→ Chiangmai (loan)	10	(1)
2019	→ SV De Meer (loan)	15	(0)
2020–2021	→ Angthong (loan)	22	(0)
2021–2022	→ Khon Kaen (loan)	24	(0)
2023–2024	→ Police Tero (loan)	24	(3)
2024	Nakhon Pathom United	12	(0)
2025–	Buriram United	14	(0)
2025–	→ Rayong (loan)	2	(0)
- * Club domestic league appearances and goals as of 11 August 2024

Maxx Peter Creevey (Thai: แม็กซ์ ปีเตอร์ ครีเวย์; born 28 April 1995) is a Thai-Australian professional soccer player who plays as a centre back or a left back for Thai League 1 club Rayong.

== Career ==
=== Club career ===
As a youth player, Creevey joined the youth academy of Australian second tier side Sutherland Sharks. In 2013, he joined the youth academy of Buriram in the Thai top flight. In 2016, he signed for Thai second tier club Khon Kaen United, but left due to them being involved with a criminal case. Before the 2018 season, Creevey signed for Chiangmai in the Thai third tier, helping them win the league and earn promotion to the Thai second tier.

In 2019, he signed for Dutch eighth tier team De Meer. Before the 2020 season, he returned to Buriram in the Thai top flight. In 2020, Creevey was sent on loan to Thai third tier outfit Angthong. In 2021, he was sent on loan to Khon Kaen in the Thai second tier.

=== International career ===
Born in Australia, Creevey is eligible to represent either Australia or Thailand internationally through his mother.

== Honours ==
Buriram United

- Thai League 1: 2024–25
- Thai FA Cup: 2024–25
- Thai League Cup: 2024–25
- ASEAN Club Championship: 2024–25
