= 2025–26 Thep Xanh Nam Dinh F.C. season =

61st season in existence of Thep Xanh Nam Dinh FC

Thep Xanh Nam Dinh
2025–26 season
- President: Nguyễn Tân Anh
- Head coach: Vũ Hồng Việt (until 24 October; from 26 February); Nguyễn Trung Kiên (from 24 October – 14 November); Mauro Jerónimo (from 14 November 2025 – 26 February 2026)
- Stadium: Thiên Trường
- V.League 1: 6th
- Vietnamese Cup: Semi-finals
- Vietnamese Super Cup: Runners-up
- ASEAN Club Championship: Semi-finals
- AFC Champions League Two: Group stage
- Top goalscorer: League: Nguyễn Xuân Son (6); All: Nguyễn Xuân Son (15)
- Highest home attendance: 15,000 (v. Cong An Hanoi, Vietnamese Super Cup, 9 August 2025)
- Lowest home attendance: 2,988 (v. Eastern, AFC Champions League Two, 11 December 2025)
- Average home league attendance: 5,808
- Biggest win: 9–0 v. Eastern (H); AFC Champions League Two, 11 December 2025
- Biggest defeat: 1–3 v. Gamba Osaka (A); AFC Champions League Two, 22 October 2025
Home colours	Away colours

The 2025–26 season was the 61st season in the history of Nam Định, and the club's 9th consecutive season in the top flight of Vietnamese football. In addition to the domestic league, the club participated in this season's editions of the Vietnamese Cup, Vietnamese Super Cup, AFC Champions League Two and ASEAN Club Championship.

== Players ==
As of 17 March 2026

Note: Flags indicate national team as defined under FIFA eligibility rules; some limited exceptions apply. Players may hold more than one non-FIFA nationality.

No.	Pos.	Nation	Player
2	DF	VIE	Đinh Xuân Khải
3	DF	VIE	Dương Thanh Hào
4	DF	BRA	Lucas Alves
5	DF	VIE	Đặng Văn Tới
6	MF	VIE	A Mít
7	DF	VIE	Nguyễn Phong Hồng Duy
8	MF	VIE	Nguyễn Đình Sơn
9	FW	VIE	Nguyễn Văn Toàn
10	MF	BRA	Caio César
11	MF	VIE	Nguyễn Tuấn Anh
13	DF	VIE	Trần Văn Kiên
14	FW	VIE	Nguyễn Xuân Son
15	MF	RSA	Njabulo Blom
16	MF	VIE	Trần Văn Công
17	DF	VIE	Nguyễn Văn Vĩ
18	DF	NED	Mitchell Dijks
19	MF	VIE	Trần Văn Đạt
20	MF	VIE	Nguyễn Trọng Bảo
22	FW	RSA	Percy Tau

No.	Pos.	Nation	Player
23	GK	VIE	Lê Vũ Phong
26	GK	VIE	Trần Nguyên Mạnh (captain)
27	FW	VIE	Trần Ngọc Sơn
28	MF	VIE	Tô Văn Vũ (vice-captain)
29	GK	VIE	Trần Đức Dũng
32	DF	VIE	Ngô Đức Huy
34	DF	BRA	Wálber
35	FW	BRA	Brenner
37	FW	ENG	Kyle Hudlin
39	FW	VIE	Lâm Ti Phông
66	MF	COD	Arnaud Lusamba
72	MF	BRA	Rômulo
77	FW	COD	Chadrac Akolo
79	DF	VIE	Lê Văn Thành
82	GK	VIE	Trần Liêm Điều
88	MF	VIE	Lý Công Hoàng Anh
93	DF	FRA	Kevin Pham Ba
97	GK	BRA	Caíque
98	DF	VIE	Giáp Tuấn Dương

== Transfers ==
=== In ===
Date	Pos.	Player	From	Fee	Ref.
1 July 2025	FW	(Vietnam) Trần Ngọc Sơn	(Vietnam) PVF-CAND	Loan return	
15 July 2025	MF	(Vietnam) A Mít	(Vietnam) Đông Á Thanh Hóa	Free	
15 July 2025	DF	(Vietnam) Đặng Văn Tới	(Vietnam) Hải Phòng	Free	
16 July 2025	DF	(France) Kevin Pham Ba	(Vietnam) Công An Hà Nội	Undisclosed	
18 July 2025	FW	(England) Kyle Hudlin	(England) Huddersfield Town	Free	
18 July 2025	MF	(South Africa) Njabulo Blom	(United States) St. Louis City	Free	
26 July 2025	FW	(Palestine) Mahmoud Eid	(Thailand) Bangkok United	Free	
11 August 2025	GK	(Brazil) Caíque	(Brazil) Criciúma	Free	
17 August 2025	FW	(South Africa) Percy Tau	Qatar SC	Free	
16 September 2025	MF	(Norway) Kristoffer Normann Hansen	(Poland) Jagiellonia Białystok	Free	
7 October 2025	FW	(Democratic Republic of the Congo) Chadrac Akolo	(Switzerland) St. Gallen	Free	
7 October 2025	MF	(Democratic Republic of the Congo) Arnaud Lusamba	(United Arab Emirates) Baniyas	Free	
3 February 2026	MF	(Vietnam) Nguyễn Trọng Bảo	(Vietnam) Xuan Thien Phu Tho	Undisclosed	
18 July 2025	DF	(Vietnam) Giáp Tuấn Dương	(Vietnam) Cong An Hanoi	Undisclosed	
18 July 2025	DF	(Vietnam) Lê Văn Thành	(Vietnam) Song Lam Nghe An	Undisclosed	

Total spending: ▼0₫ (€0)

=== Out ===
Date	Pos.	Player	To	Fee	Ref.
5 July 2025	DF	(Vietnam) Trần Quang Thịnh	(Vietnam) Truong Tuoi Binh Phuoc	Free	
5 July 2025	FW	(Vietnam) Nguyễn Văn Anh	(Vietnam) Becamex Ho Chi Minh City	Free	
10 July 2025	MF	(Vietnam) Trần Văn Trung	(Vietnam) Bac Ninh	Free	
13 July 2025	FW	(Brazil) China	(Vietnam) Công An Hà Nội	Free	
1 August 2025	FW	(Vietnam) Hoàng Minh Tuấn	(Vietnam) Xuan Thien Phu Tho	Free	
4 August 2025	FW	(Uganda) Joseph Mpande	(Vietnam) PVF-CAND	Free	
19 January 2026	MF	(Norway) Kristoffer Normann Hansen	(China) Dalian K'un City	Free	
15 March 2026	FW	(Palestine) Mahmoud Eid	(Vietnam) PVF-CAND	Loan	

Total income: ▲0₫ (€0)

== Pre-season and friendlies ==
Win Draw Loss Fixtures

26 June 2025 Friendly	Thep Xanh Nam Dinh	1–2	Libolo	Hanoi, Vietnam
--:-- UTC+7	China	Report	Quintas; Aguinaldo	Stadium: Hàng Đẫy Stadium

24 July 2025 Friendly	Suwon FC	1–2	Thep Xanh Nam Dinh	Suwon, South Korea
--:-- UTC+9		Report	Hudlin; Trần Văn Kiên

28 July 2025 Friendly	FC Seoul	1–3	Thep Xanh Nam Dinh	Seoul, South Korea
--:-- UTC+9		Report	Rômulo (pen.); Hudlin; Wálber

31 July 2025 Friendly	Suwon FC	1–2	Thep Xanh Nam Dinh	Suwon, South Korea
--:-- UTC+9		Report	Brenner; Hudlin

4 September 2025 Hybrid friendly	Vietnam	0–4	Thep Xanh Nam Dinh	Hanoi, Vietnam
--:-- UTC+7		Report	Rômulo; Eid; Hudlin	Stadium: Vietnam Youth Football Training Center

7 September 2025 Friendly	Thep Xanh Nam Dinh	3–0	Phu Tho	Ninh Bình, Vietnam
--:-- UTC+7	Brenner; Hudlin	Report (1); Report (2)		Stadium: Thiên Trường Stadium

11 October 2025 Friendly	Thep Xanh Nam Dinh	1–0	PVF-CAND B	Ninh Bình, Vietnam
--:-- UTC+7		Report		Stadium: Thiên Trường Stadium

12 January 2026 Friendly	Thep Xanh Nam Dinh	4–2	Cong An Ho Chi Minh City	Ninh Bình, Vietnam
16:30 UTC+7	Lâm Ti Phông; Nguyễn Xuân Son; Romulo; Nguyễn Văn Vĩ	Report	Nguyễn Tiến Linh; Ngo	Stadium: Thiên Trường Stadium

15 January 2026 Friendly	Thep Xanh Nam Dinh	3–1	Bac Ninh	Ninh Bình, Vietnam
16:00 UTC+7	Brenner; Trần Văn Đạt; Lý Công Hoàng Anh	Report	?	Stadium: Thiên Trường Stadium

17 January 2026 Friendly	Ninh Binh	2–2	Thep Xanh Nam Dinh	Ninh Bình, Vietnam
--:-- UTC+7	Trần Bảo Toàn; Nguyễn Hoàng Đức	Report (TXNĐ); Report (NBFC)	Brenner; Caio	Stadium: Ninh Bình Stadium

23 January 2026 Friendly	Cong An Hanoi	2–2	Thep Xanh Nam Dinh	Hanoi, Vietnam
--:-- UTC+7	Alan; Vitão	Report (TXNĐ); Report (CAHN)	Tau	Stadium: Hàng Đẫy Stadium

26 March 2026 Friendly	Ninh Binh	2–2	Thep Xanh Nam Dinh	Ninh Bình, Vietnam
17:00 UTC+7	Henrique; Lê Hải Đức	Report (TXNĐ); Report (NBFC)	Tau; Nguyễn Trọng Bảo	Stadium: Ninh Bình Stadium

29 March 2026 Friendly	Hanoi FC	2–0	Thep Xanh Nam Dinh	Hanoi, Vietnam
16:00 UTC+7	Nguyễn Văn Tùng; Đỗ Hùng Dũng	Report (HNFC); Report (TXNĐ)		Stadium: Hàng Đẫy Stadium

== Competitions ==
=== Overall record ===
Competition	First match	Last match	Starting round	Final position	Record							
Competition	First match	Last match	Starting round	Final position	Pld	W	D	L	GF	GA	GD	Win %
V.League 1	16 August 2025	7 June 2026	Matchday 1	6th	26	9	8	9	33	32	+1	34.62
Vietnamese Cup	23 November 2025	11 June 2026	Round of 16	Semi-finals	3	2	0	1	6	5	+1	66.67
Vietnamese Super Cup	9 August 2025		Final	Runners-up	1	0	0	1	2	3	−1	0.00
AFC Champions League Two	17 September 2025	11 December 2025	Group stage	Group stage	6	3	0	3	14	7	+7	50.00
ASEAN Club Championship	25 September 2025	13 May 2026	Group stage	Semi-finals	7	4	1	2	14	7	+7	57.14
Total					43	18	9	16	69	54	+15	41.86

Source: Soccerway

=== V.League 1 ===
==== League table ====
Pos	Team	Pld	W	D	L	GF	GA	GD	Pts	Qualification or relegation
4	Hanoi FC	26	14	4	8	48	30	+18	46	
5	Cong An Ho Chi Minh City	26	10	6	10	28	36	−8	36	Qualification for the ASEAN Club Championship group stage (Note: Cong An Ho Chi Minh City, the winners of the 2025–26 Vietnamese Cup, qualified for the ASEAN Club Championship group stage.)
6	Thep Xanh Nam Dinh	26	9	8	9	33	32	+1	35	
7	Haiphong	26	9	5	12	37	36	+1	32	
8	Hong Linh Ha Tinh	26	7	8	11	15	29	−14	29	

Source: VPF
Rules for classification: 1) Points; 2) Head-to-head points; 3) Head-to-head goal difference; 4) Head-to-head goals scored; 5) Goal difference; 6) Goals scored; 7) Away goals scored; 8) Disciplinary points.

==== Results summary ====
Overall								Home						Away					
Pld	W	D	L	GF	GA	GD	Pts	W	D	L	GF	GA	GD	W	D	L	GF	GA	GD
26	9	8	9	33	32	+1	35	6	2	4	17	14	+3	3	6	5	16	18	−2

Source: VPF

==== Results by round ====
Round	1	2	3	6	4	5	7	8	9	11	12	13	10	14	15	16	17	18	19	20	21	22	23	24	25	26
Ground	H	A	H	A	A	H	H	H	A	H	A	H	A	H	A	H	A	H	A	H	H	A	H	A	H	A
Result	W	L	W	D	L	L	L	D	D	D	D	D	L	W	W	W	W	L	W	D	W	L	L	L	W	D
Position	3	6	5	4	7	7	10	9	8	10	9	10	10	10	9	7	7	7	6	7	5	6	7	7	6	6

Source: VPF
A = Away; H = Home; W = Win; D = Draw; L = Loss

==== Matches ====
Win Draw Loss Fixtures

16 August 2025 1	Thep Xanh Nam Dinh	2–1	Haiphong	Ninh Bình
18:00	Trần Văn Kiên (yellow card) 11'; Lý Công Hoàng Anh 67'; Kevin Pham Ba 88'	Report	Luiz 32'; Bicou (yellow card) 60'	Stadium: Thiên Trường Stadium; Attendance: 7,000; Referee: Nguyễn Trung Kiên

23 August 2025 2	Song Lam Nghe An	2–1	Thep Xanh Nam Dinh	Nghệ An
18:00	Ngô Văn Lương 41'; Moore 81'; Trần Mạnh Quỳnh (yellow card) 89'	Report	Lâm Ti Phông 9'; Trần Văn Công (yellow card) 80'	Stadium: Vinh Stadium; Attendance: 4,500; Referee: Trần Ngọc Ánh

27 August 2025 3	Thep Xanh Nam Dinh	2–1	PVF-CAND	Ninh Bình
18:00	Eyenga 53' (o.g.); César 66'	Report	Nguyễn Thanh Nhàn 45+2'	Stadium: Thiên Trường Stadium; Attendance: 6,800; Referee: Nguyễn Viết Duẩn

13 September 2025 6	Cong An Ho Chi Minh City	0–0	Thep Xanh Nam Dinh	Ho Chi Minh City
19:15	Khổng Minh Gia Bảo (yellow card) 12'; Võ Huy Toàn (yellow card) 5'; Lê Quang Hùng (yellow card) 90+2'; Makrillos (yellow card) 90+4'	Report	Trần Văn Kiên (yellow card) 55'; Nguyễn Văn Vĩ (yellow card) 58'	Stadium: Thống Nhất Stadium; Attendance: 7,500; Referee: Ngô Duy Lân

22 September 2025 4	Ninh Binh	2–0	Thep Xanh Nam Dinh	Ninh Bình
18:00	Nguyễn Hoàng Đức 30'; Đỗ Thanh Thịnh 34'; Dụng Quang Nho (yellow card) 39'; Nguyễn Đức Chiến (yellow card) 67'; Nguyễn Trọng Long (yellow card) 72'	Report	Lý Công Hoàng Anh (yellow card) 20'; Caio César (yellow card) 47'; Nguyễn Tuấn Anh (yellow card) 66'; Rômulo (yellow card) 70'	Stadium: Ninh Bình Stadium; Attendance: 13,200; Referee: Lê Vũ Linh

28 September 2025 5	Thep Xanh Nam Dinh	0–2	Cong An Hanoi	Ninh Bình
18:00	Nguyễn Văn Vĩ (yellow card) 25'; A Mít (yellow card) 28'	Report	Artur 37'; Alan 68'; Nguyễn Đình Bắc (yellow card) 76'	Stadium: Thiên Trường Stadium; Attendance: 4,500; Referee: Nguyễn Viết Duẩn

18 October 2025 7	Thep Xanh Nam Dinh	1–2	Becamex Ho Chi Minh City	Ninh Bình
18:00	A Mít (yellow card) 38'; Rômulo 56'; Trần Văn Công (yellow card) 85'	Report	Võ Hoàng Minh Khoa 38'; Oduenyi 53' (pen.); Trần Minh Toàn (yellow card) 90+5'; Hồ Tuấn Tài (yellow card) 90+7'; Võ Minh Trọng (yellow card) 90+10'	Stadium: Thiên Trường Stadium; Attendance: 4,500; Referee: Lê Vũ Linh

27 October 2025 8	Thep Xanh Nam Dinh	1–1	SHB Da Nang	Ninh Bình
18:00	Trần Văn Công (yellow card) 28'; Lucão 89'	Report	Nguyễn Phi Hoàng 14', (yellow card) 31'; Makarić (yellow card) 9'; Kim Dong-su (yellow card) 57'; Phạm Đình Duy (yellow card) 88'	Stadium: Thiên Trường Stadium; Attendance: 4,000; Referee: Hoàng Ngọc Hà

31 October 2025 9	Hoang Anh Gia Lai	2–2	Thep Xanh Nam Dinh	Gia Lai
17:00	Nguyễn Minh Tâm 19'; Nguyễn Thanh Nhân 45'	Report	Brenner 32', 36'; Rômulo (yellow card) 46'	Stadium: Pleiku Stadium; Attendance: 4,000; Referee: Đỗ Khánh Nam

10 November 2025 11	Thep Xanh Nam Dinh	1–1	Hanoi FC	Ninh Bình
18:00	Lucas Alves 7'; Nguyễn Tuấn Anh (yellow card) 39'; Tau (yellow card) 71'; Lâm Ti Phông (yellow card) 88'; Nguyễn Văn Vĩ (yellow card) 90+3'	Report	Nguyễn Thành Chung (yellow card) 7'; Phạm Xuân Mạnh 32'; Đậu Văn Toàn (yellow card) 53'; Lê Xuân Tú (yellow card) 80'	Stadium: Thiên Trường Stadium; Attendance: 9,000; Referee: Lê Vũ Linh

1 February 2026 12	Dong A Thanh Hoa	2–2	Thep Xanh Nam Dinh	Thanh Hóa
18:00	Abdurakhmanov (yellow card) 22'; Nguyễn Đình Huyên 39', (yellow card) 41'; Dương Thanh Hào 78' (o.g.); Nguyễn Văn Tùng (yellow card) 90+2'	Report	Lâm Ti Phông 6'; Brenner 29'; Đặng Văn Tới (yellow card) 51'	Stadium: Thanh Hóa Stadium; Attendance: 4,000; Referee: Trần Thế Anh

9 February 2026 13	Thep Xanh Nam Dinh	1–1	Hong Linh Ha Tinh	Ninh Bình
18:00	Tau 4'; Nguyễn Xuân Son (yellow card) 56'	Report	Helerson (yellow card) 52'; Bùi Duy Thường (yellow card) 59'; João Pereira 90+8'	Stadium: Thiên Trường Stadium; Attendance: 3,200; Referee: Nguyễn Mạnh Hải

24 February 2026 10	The Cong-Viettel	1–0	Thep Xanh Nam Dinh	Hanoi
19:15	Nguyễn Đức Hoàng Minh (yellow card) 31'; Wesley (yellow card) 32'; Nguyễn Văn Tú (yellow card) 67'; Lê Quốc Nhật Nam 69'	Report	Nguyễn Đình Sơn (yellow card) 45+3'; Nguyễn Xuân Son (yellow card) 90+3'	Stadium: Hàng Đẫy Stadium; Attendance: 7,000; Referee: Hoàng Thanh Bình

1 March 2026 14	Thep Xanh Nam Dinh	3–2	Ninh Binh	Ninh Bình
18:00	Akolo 41'; Nguyễn Xuân Son 74'; Kevin Pham Ba 82'	Report	Đỗ Thanh Thịnh 8'; Nguyễn Hoàng Đức 32', (yellow card) 55'; Geovane (yellow card) 38'	Stadium: Thiên Trường Stadium; Attendance: 8,500; Referee: Ngô Duy Lân

8 March 2026 15	PVF-CAND	0–1	Thep Xanh Nam Dinh	Hưng Yên
17:00	Nguyễn Anh Tuấn (yellow card) 26'; Nguyễn Thanh Nhàn (yellow card) 78'	Report	Lucão 90'	Stadium: PVF Stadium; Attendance: 5,000; Referee: Nguyễn Trung Kiên

13 March 2026 16	Thep Xanh Nam Dinh	1–0	Dong A Thanh Hoa	Ninh Bình
18:00	Trần Văn Đạt (yellow card) 36'; Akolo 78'; Lucão (red card) 87'	Report	Nguyễn Đình Huyên (yellow card) 42'; Abdurakhmanov (yellow card) 60'; Lục Xuân Hưng (yellow card) 70'; Lê Quốc Phương (yellow card) 75'; Đoàn Ngọc Hà (yellow card) 90+3'	Stadium: Thiên Trường Stadium; Attendance: 6,000; Referee: Nguyễn Mạnh Hải

5 April 2026 17	Hong Linh Ha Tinh	0–2	Thep Xanh Nam Dinh	Hà Tĩnh
18:00	Nguyễn Đức Việt (yellow card) 32'; Mai Sỹ Hoàng (yellow card) 90+1'; Helerson (yellow card) 90+4'; Huỳnh Tấn Tài (yellow card) 90+8'	Report	Nguyễn Xuân Son 36' (pen.); César (yellow card) 39'; Trần Nguyên Mạnh (yellow card) 45+1'; Akolo 48'; Giáp Tuấn Dương (yellow card) 51'	Stadium: Hà Tĩnh Stadium; Attendance: 5,000; Referee: Nguyễn Viết Duẩn

11 April 2026 18	Thep Xanh Nam Dinh	1–2	Hoang Anh Gia Lai	Ninh Bình
18:00	Lý Công Hoàng Anh 72'	Report	Batista 45+2'; Lương Thanh Ngọc Lâm 81'; Nguyễn Hữu Anh Tài (yellow card) 90+2'	Stadium: Thiên Trường Stadium; Attendance: 8,000; Referee: Nguyễn Trung Kiên

19 April 2026 19	SHB Da Nang	1–2	Thep Xanh Nam Dinh	Đà Nẵng
18:00	Phan Văn Biểu (red card) 45+1'; López 51'; Vũ Văn Sơn (yellow card) 67'	Report	Nguyễn Xuân Son 20'; Akolo 61'	Stadium: Chi Lăng Stadium; Attendance: 10,000; Referee: Nguyễn Mạnh Hải

25 April 2026 20	Becamex Ho Chi Minh City	1–1	Thep Xanh Nam Dinh	Ho Chi Minh City
18:00	Nguyễn Trần Việt Cường 3'; Zlatković (yellow card) 38'	Report	Nguyễn Văn Vĩ (yellow card) 26'; Trần Văn Đạt (yellow card) 36'; Tô Văn Vũ (yellow card) 48'; Giáp Tuấn Dương 67'	Stadium: Bình Dương Stadium; Attendance: 4,000; Referee: Hoàng Ngọc Hà

1 May 2026 21	Thep Xanh Nam Dinh	2–0	Cong An Ho Chi Minh City	Ninh Bình
18:00	Brenner 53'; Nguyễn Văn Vĩ 82'	Report	Williams (yellow card) 42'; Raphael (yellow card) 58'	Stadium: Thiên Trường Stadium; Attendance: 7,000; Referee: Trương Hồng Vũ

10 May 2026 22	Cong An Hanoi	3–2	Thep Xanh Nam Dinh	Hanoi
18:00	Nguyễn Đình Bắc 6', 82' (pen.); Alan (yellow card) 18'; Mauk (yellow card) 20'; Bùi Hoàng Việt Anh 53'; China (yellow card) 90+4'	Report	Trần Ngọc Sơn 17'; Trần Văn Đạt 28'; Đặng Văn Tới (yellow card) 49'; Nguyễn Tuấn Anh (yellow card) 65'	Stadium: Hàng Đẫy Stadium; Attendance: 16,900; Referee: Nguyễn Mạnh Hải

17 May 2026 23	Thep Xanh Nam Dinh	0–2	The Cong-Viettel	Ninh Bình
18:00	Tô Văn Vũ (yellow card) 25'	Report	Paulinho (yellow card) 36'; Đinh Xuân Tiến 38'; Nhâm Mạnh Dũng 43'; Lucão (yellow card) 73'; Đinh Viết Tú (yellow card) 88' (yellow-red card) 90+3'	Stadium: Thiên Trường Stadium; Attendance: 4,000; Referee: Mai Xuân Hùng

24 May 2026 24	Hanoi FC	2–1	Thep Xanh Nam Dinh	Hanoi
19:15	Đỗ Hoàng Hên 7' (pen.); Passira 74'; Nguyễn Thành Chung (yellow card) 82'	Report	Lâm Ti Phông 48'	Stadium: Hàng Đẫy Stadium; Attendance: 6,000; Referee: Ngô Duy Lân

31 May 2026 25	Thep Xanh Nam Dinh	3–0	Song Lam Nghe An	Ninh Bình
18:00	Nguyễn Xuân Son 14', 30', 69'; A Mít (yellow card) 28'	Report	Nguyễn Quang Vinh (yellow card) 10'; Phan Văn Thành (yellow card) 90+2'	Stadium: Thiên Trường Stadium; Attendance: 3,000; Referee: Trần Thế Anh

7 June 2026 26	Haiphong	1–1	Thep Xanh Nam Dinh	Haiphong
18:00	Hồ Minh Dĩ 45+2'; Đàm Tiến Dũng (yellow card) 55'	Report	Trần Văn Kiên (yellow card) 35'; Lâm Ti Phông 40'; Nguyễn Phong Hồng Duy (yellow card) 90+2'	Stadium: Lạch Tray Stadium; Attendance: 12,300; Referee: Nguyễn Ngọc Tùng

=== Vietnamese Cup ===
The both qualifying round and round of 16 draw was held on 11 August 2025.

23 November 2025 Round of 16	Thep Xanh Nam Dinh	2–0	Long An	Ninh Bình
18:00	Brenner 71'; Lâm Ti Phông 84'	Report	Nguyễn Tài Lộc (yellow card) 67'	Stadium: Thiên Trường Stadium; Attendance: 6,000; Referee: Hoàng Thanh Bình

18 March 2026 Quarter-finals	SHB Da Nang	1–2	Thep Xanh Nam Dinh	Đà Nẵng
18:00	Vũ Văn Sơn (yellow card) 25'; Nguyễn Phi Hoàng 58', (yellow card) 82'	Report	Trần Nguyên Mạnh (yellow card) 16'; Nguyễn Xuân Son 28'; Akolo 39'; Tô Văn Vũ (yellow card) 65'; Trần Ngọc Sơn (yellow card) 83'	Stadium: Chi Lăng Stadium; Attendance: 5,500; Referee: Lê Đức Tuấn

11 June 2026 Semi-finals	Cong An Ho Chi Minh City	4–2	Thep Xanh Nam Dinh	Ninh Bình
18:00	Nguyễn Xuân Son 71'; Trần Ngọc Sơn (yellow card) 75'; Lý Công Hoàng Anh 79'	Report	Utzig 18'; Felipe 23'; Williams 37'; Khổng Minh Gia Bảo 43'; Bùi Ngọc Long (yellow card) 90+2'	Stadium: Thiên Trường Stadium; Attendance: 5,000; Referee: Nazmi Nasaruddin (Malaysia)

=== Vietnamese Super Cup ===
9 August 2025 Final	Thép Xanh Nam Định	2–3	Công An Hà Nội	Ninh Bình
18:00	Lý Công Hoàng Anh (yellow card) 8'; Lâm Ti Phông (yellow card) 33'; Hudlin 54', 90+15' (pen.) (yellow card) 57'	Report	Alan 38'; Trần Đình Trọng (yellow card) 44'; Adou (yellow card) 60'; Artur 90+3'; Nguyễn Filip (yellow card) 90+7'; Nguyễn Đình Bắc 90+8' (yellow card) 90+9'; Gomes (yellow card) 90+13'; Lê Phạm Thành Long (yellow card) 90+16'	Stadium: Thiên Trường Stadium; Attendance: 15,000; Referee: Xuân Hùng Mai

=== AFC Champions League Two ===
==== Group stage ====
The group stage draw was held on 15 August 2025.

===== Group F table =====
Pos	Team	Pld	W	D	L	GF	GA	GD	Pts	Qualification	GOS	RPM	TND	EAS
1	(Japan) Gamba Osaka	6	6	0	0	16	2	+14	18	Advance to round of 16	—	2–0	3–1	3–1
2	(Thailand) Ratchaburi	6	3	0	3	15	8	+7	9	Advance to round of 16	0–2	—	2–0	5–1
3	(Vietnam) Nam Định	6	3	0	3	14	7	+7	9		0–1	3–1	—	9–0
4	(Hong Kong) Eastern	6	0	0	6	2	30	−28	0		0–5	0–7	0–1	—

Source: ACL2
Rules for classification: Tiebreakers

Round	1	2	3	4	5	6
Ground	H	A	A	H	A	H
Result	W	W	L	L	L	W
Position	2	2	2	2	3	3

Source: AFC
A = Away; H = Home; W = Win; D = Draw; L = Loss

===== Group stage matches =====
17 September 2025 1	Nam Định (Vietnam)	3–1	(Thailand) Ratchaburi	Ninh Bình, Vietnam
19:15 UTC+7	Caio César 35'; Brenner 52', 57'; Trần Văn Công (yellow card) 69'	Report	Tana 60'	Stadium: Thiên Trường Stadium; Attendance: 8,618; Referee: Kim Yu-jeong (South Korea)

2 October 2025 2	Eastern (Hong Kong)	0–1	(Vietnam) Nam Định	Hong Kong
18:00 UTC+8	Lam Hin Ting (yellow card) 16'	Report	Hansen 54'; Kevin Pham Ba (yellow card) 17'; Brenner (yellow card) 24'; Caíque (yellow card) 90+3'	Stadium: Mong Kok Stadium; Attendance: 1,511; Referee: Hassan Akrami (Iran)

22 October 2025 3	Gamba Osaka (Japan)	3–1	(Vietnam) Nam Định	Suita, Japan
19:00 UTC+9	Mito 16'; Okunuki (yellow card) 51'; Jebali 52'; Walbér 89' (o.g.)	Report	Eid (yellow card) 39'; Trần Văn Kiên (yellow card) 80'; Hudlin 90+4'	Stadium: Suita City Football Stadium; Attendance: 9,231; Referee: Ahmed Khalil (Bahrain)

5 November 2025 4	Nam Định (Vietnam)	0–1	(Japan) Gamba Osaka	Ninh Bình, Vietnam
19:15 UTC+7	Wálber (yellow card) 58'; Dijks (yellow card) 88'; Đặng Văn Tới (yellow card) 90+2'	Report	Mito 8'; Kurata (yellow card) 90+3'	Stadium: Thiên Trường Stadium; Attendance: 4,518; Referee: Baraa Aisha (Palestine)

27 November 2025 5	Ratchaburi (Thailand)	2–0	(Vietnam) Nam Định	Ratchaburi, Thailand
17:00 UTC+7	Thanawat (yellow card) 26'; Sidcley 90+2'; Ikhsan 90+5', (yellow card) 90+5'; Denílson (yellow card) 90+6'	Report	Caio César (yellow card) 16'; Rômulo (yellow card) 45'; Wálber (yellow card) 52'; Pham Ba (yellow card) 89'	Stadium: Dragon Solar Park; Attendance: 3,779; Referee: Nasrullo Kabirov (Tajikstan)

11 December 2025 6	Nam Định (Vietnam)	9–0	(Hong Kong) Eastern	Ninh Bình, Vietnam
17:00 UTC+7	Caio 2'; Kevin Pham Ba 4'; Lý Công Hoàng Anh 10', (yellow card) 25'; Rômulo 17', 19'; Brenner 42', 59' (pen.), 64'; Leung Chun Pong 90+2' (o.g.)	Report	Lau Kwan Ching (yellow card) 25'; Okubo (yellow card) 76'	Stadium: Thiên Trường Stadium; Attendance: 2,988; Referee: Kim Dae-yong (South Korea)

=== ASEAN Club Championship ===
==== Group B table ====
The group stage draw was held on 4 July 2025.

Pos	Team	Pld	W	D	L	GF	GA	GD	Pts	Qualification
1	(Vietnam) Nam Định	5	4	1	0	13	3	+10	13	Advance to knockout stage
2	(Malaysia) Johor Darul Ta'zim	5	3	2	0	13	4	+9	11	Advance to knockout stage
3	(Cambodia) Preah Khan Reach Svay Rieng	5	2	2	1	9	5	+4	8	
4	(Thailand) Bangkok United	5	1	2	2	6	12	−6	5	
5	(Singapore) Lion City Sailors	5	1	1	3	6	12	−6	4	
6	(Myanmar) Shan United	5	0	0	5	3	14	−11	0	

Source: ASEAN United FC
Rules for classification: Tiebreakers

Round	1	2	3	4	5
Ground	H	A	A	H	H
Result	W	W	W	W	D
Position	3	2	1	1	1
Points	3	6	9	12	13

Source: ASEAN United FC
A = Away; H = Home; W = Win; D = Draw; L = Loss

===== Group stage matches =====
25 September 2025 1	Nam Định (Vietnam)	2–1	(Cambodia) PKR Svay Rieng	Ninh Bình, Vietnam
19:30 UTC+7	Lâm Ti Phông 36', 40'; Eid (red card) 59'; Trần Văn Kiên (yellow card) 74'; Caíque (yellow card) 90+1'; Đặng Văn Tới (yellow card) 90+3'	Report	Patrick 81'	Stadium: Thiên Trường Stadium; Attendance: 5,018; Referee: Kim Woo-sung (South Korea)

4 December 2025 2	Shan United (Myanmar)	0–3	(Vietnam) Nam Định	Taunggyi, Myanmar
18:00 UTC+6:30	Sekyi (red card) 82'	Report	Nguyễn Xuân Son (yellow card) 31', (goal) 45+2' (pen.), 51', 87'	Stadium: Taunggyi Stadium; Referee: Firdavs Nosafarov (Uzbekistan)

17 December 2025 3	Bangkok United (Thailand)	1–4	(Vietnam) Nam Định	Pathum Thani, Thailand
19:00 UTC+7	Keereeleang (yellow card) 75'; Wisarut 85'; Promsomboon (yellow card) 90+3'	Report	Rômulo (yellow card) 11'; Lucas 44'; Nguyễn Xuân Son 49', 90+6', (yellow card) 90+7'; Trần Ngọc Sơn 59'	Stadium: True BG Stadium; Attendance: 553; Referee: Yahya Al-Balushi (Oman)

29 January 2025 4	Nam Định (Vietnam)	3–0	(Singapore) Lion City Sailors	Ninh Bình, Vietnam
19:30 UTC+7	Trần Văn Kiên (yellow card) 20'; Caio 35'; Nguyễn Xuân Son 61', 90+3'	Report	Adam (yellow card) 90+5'	Stadium: Thiên Trường Stadium; Attendance: 3,918; Referee: Mohammed Al-Shammari (Qatar)

5 February 2025 5	Nam Định (Vietnam)	1–1	(Malaysia) Johor Darul Ta'zim	Ninh Bình, Vietnam
19:30 UTC+7	Rômulo (yellow card) 28'; Nguyễn Văn Vĩ 33'; Lâm Ti Phông (yellow card) 82'	Report	Safari (yellow card) 30'; Hevel (yellow card) 34'; Baharudin (yellow card) 82'; Bergson 87' (pen.)	Stadium: Thiên Trường Stadium; Attendance: 3,335; Referee: Hiroki Kasahara (Japan)

==== Knockout stage ====
===== Semi-finals =====
6 May 2026 First leg	Selangor (Malaysia)	2–1	(Vietnam) Nam Định	Petaling Jaya, Malaysia
21:00 UTC+8	Khalili (yellow card) 3'; Laine (yellow card) 36'; Chrigor 38', 58'	Report	Nguyễn Xuân Son (yellow card) 25'; Wálber (yellow card) 41'; Nguyễn Văn Vĩ 45+1', (yellow card) 78'; Trần Văn Đạt (yellow card) 90+4'	Stadium: Petaling Jaya Stadium; Attendance: 5,733; Referee: Sami Al-Ismail (Saudi Arabia)

13 May 2026 Second leg	Nam Định (Vietnam)	0–2 (1–4 agg.)	(Malaysia) Selangor	Ninh Bình, Vietnam
17:30 UTC+7	Dijks (yellow card) 38'; Nguyễn Xuân Son (yellow card) 85'	Report	Boumous (yellow card) 8'; Chrigor 30' (pen.), 90', (yellow card) 90+1'	Stadium: Thiên Trường Stadium; Attendance: 16,345; Referee: Koji Takasaki (Japan)

== Statistics ==
=== Appearances and goals ===
No.	Pos	Nat	Player	Total		V.League 1		Vietnamese Cup		Vietnamese Super Cup		AFC Champions League Two		ASEAN Club Championship	
No.	Pos	Nat	Player	Apps	Goals	Apps	Goals	Apps	Goals	Apps	Goals	Apps	Goals	Apps	Goals
Goalkeepers
23	GK	(Vietnam) VIE	Lê Vũ Phong	2	0	2	0	0	0	0	0	0	0	0	0
26	GK	(Vietnam) VIE	Trần Nguyên Mạnh	33	0	23+1	0	3	0	1	0	0	0	5	0
29	GK	(Vietnam) VIE	Trần Đức Dũng	0	0	0	0	0	0	0	0	0	0	0	0
82	GK	(Vietnam) VIE	Trần Liêm Điều	3	0	1+2	0	0	0	0	0	0	0	0	0
97	GK	(Brazil) BRA	Caíque	8	0	0	0	0	0	0	0	6	0	2	0
Defenders
2	DF	(Vietnam) VIE	Đinh Xuân Khải	0	0	0	0	0	0	0	0	0	0	0	0
3	DF	(Vietnam) VIE	Dương Thanh Hào	20	0	10+7	0	2	0	0	0	1	0	0	0
4	DF	(Brazil) BRA	Lucas Alves	28	4	13	3	2	0	0	0	6	0	7	1
5	DF	(Vietnam) VIE	Đặng Văn Tới	29	0	21+1	0	0	0	1	0	2	0	1+3	0
7	DF	(Vietnam) VIE	Nguyễn Phong Hồng Duy	26	0	14+4	0	2	0	0	0	1+1	0	2+2	0
13	DF	(Vietnam) VIE	Trần Văn Kiên	29	0	19+1	0	1+1	0	1	0	1+1	0	4	0
17	DF	(Vietnam) VIE	Nguyễn Văn Vĩ	40	3	18+6	1	1+2	0	1	0	0+5	0	6+1	2
24	DF	(Netherlands) NED	Mitchell Dijks	9	0	0	0	0	0	0	0	4+1	0	4	0
32	DF	(Vietnam) VIE	Ngô Đức Huy	5	0	1+2	0	0	0	1	0	0+1	0	0	0
34	DF	(Brazil) BRA	Wálber	13	0	0	0	0	0	0	0	6	0	7	0
79	DF	(Vietnam) VIE	Lê Văn Thành	1	0	1	0	0	0	0	0	0	0	0	0
93	DF	(France) FRA	Kevin Pham Ba	28	3	3+15	2	2+1	0	0+1	0	4	1	2	0
98	DF	(Vietnam) VIE	Giáp Tuấn Dương	12	1	8	1	1+1	0	0	0	0	0	2	0
Midfielders
6	MF	(Vietnam) VIE	A Mít	19	0	8+8	0	2	0	0	0	0	0	1	0
8	MF	(Vietnam) VIE	Nguyễn Đình Sơn	6	0	2+4	0	0	0	0	0	0	0	0	0
10	MF	(Brazil) BRA	Caio César	33	4	15+4	1	2	0	1	0	5	2	6	1
11	MF	(Vietnam) VIE	Nguyễn Tuấn Anh	23	0	9+5	0	0+2	0	1	0	0+2	0	3+1	0
15	MF	(South Africa) RSA	Njabulo Blom	0	0	0	0	0	0	0	0	0	0	0	0
16	MF	(Vietnam) VIE	Trần Văn Công	13	0	2+7	0	0	0	0+1	0	0+2	0	1	0
19	MF	(Vietnam) VIE	Trần Văn Đạt	22	1	14+3	1	3	0	0	0	0	0	0+2	0
20	MF	(Vietnam) VIE	Nguyễn Trọng Bảo	1	0	1	0	0	0	0	0	0	0	0	0
28	MF	(Vietnam) VIE	Tô Văn Vũ	22	0	13+5	0	2+1	0	0	0	0	0	0+1	0
39	MF	(Vietnam) VIE	Lâm Ti Phông	33	6	13+10	3	2	1	1	0	1+3	0	2+1	2
66	MF	(Democratic Republic of the Congo) COD	Arnaud Lusamba	6	0	3	0	0	0	0	0	0	0	3	0
72	MF	(Brazil) BRA	Rômulo	30	3	16+2	1	1	0	1	0	6	2	4	0
88	MF	(Vietnam) VIE	Lý Công Hoàng Anh	37	4	18+6	2	2+1	1	1	0	4+1	1	1+3	0
Forwards
9	FW	(Vietnam) VIE	Nguyễn Văn Toàn	4	0	1+3	0	0	0	0	0	0	0	0	0
14	FW	(Vietnam) VIE	Nguyễn Xuân Son	21	15	11+2	6	2	2	0	0	1	0	5	7
22	FW	(South Africa) RSA	Percy Tau	22	1	4+5	1	0	0	0	0	6	0	7	0
27	FW	(Vietnam) VIE	Trần Ngọc Sơn	18	2	6+5	1	1+2	0	0+1	0	0	0	0+3	1
35	FW	(Brazil) BRA	Brenner Marlos	28	10	14+2	4	0+3	1	1	0	4+2	5	0+2	0
37	FW	(England) ENG	Kyle Hudlin	10	3	0+5	0	0	0	0+1	2	0+4	1	0	0
77	FW	(Democratic Republic of the Congo) COD	Chadrac Akolo	13	5	8+3	4	1	1	0	0	0	0	1	0
Players transferred/loaned out during the season
12	FW	(Palestine) PLE	Mahmoud Eid	7	0	1	0	0	0	0+1	0	3+1	0	1	0
21	MF	(Norway) NOR	Kristoffer Normann Hansen	7	1	0	0	0	0	0	0	5+1	1	1	0

Source: Competitions

=== Goalscorers ===
The list is sorted by squad number when total goals are equal.

Rank	No.	Pos.	Nat.	Player	V.League 1	Vietnamese Cup	Vietnamese Super Cup	AFC Champions League Two	ASEAN Club Championship	Total
1	14	FW	(Vietnam)	Nguyễn Xuân Son	6	2	0	0	7	15
2	35	FW	(Brazil)	Brenner Marlos	4	1	0	5	0	10
3	39	MF	(Vietnam)	Lâm Ti Phông	4	1	0	0	2	7
4	77	FW	(Democratic Republic of the Congo)	Chadrac Akolo	4	1	0	0	0	5
5	5	DF	(Brazil)	Lucas Alves	3	0	0	0	1	4
5	10	MF	(Brazil)	Caio César	1	0	0	2	1	4
5	88	MF	(Vietnam)	Lý Công Hoàng Anh	2	1	0	1	0	4
6	17	DF	(Vietnam)	Nguyễn Văn Vĩ	1	0	0	0	2	3
6	37	FW	(England)	Kyle Hudlin	0	0	2	1	0	3
6	72	MF	(Brazil)	Rômulo	1	0	0	2	0	3
6	93	DF	(France)	Kevin Pham Ba	2	0	0	1	0	3
7	27	FW	(Vietnam)	Trần Ngọc Sơn	1	0	0	0	1	2
8	19	MF	(Vietnam)	Trần Văn Đạt	1	0	0	0	0	1
8	21	MF	(Norway)	Kristoffer Normann Hansen	0	0	0	1	0	1
8	22	FW	(South Africa)	Percy Tau	1	0	0	0	0	1
8	98	DF	(Vietnam)	Giáp Tuấn Dương	1	0	0	0	0	1
Own goals					1	0	0	1	0	2
Totals					32	4	2	14	14	66

Source: Competitions
