= 2026–27 Thep Xanh Nam Dinh F.C. season =

62nd season in existence of Thep Xanh Nam Dinh FC

Thep Xanh Nam Dinh
2026–27 season
- President: Nguyễn Tân Anh
- Head coach: Vũ Hồng Việt
- Stadium: Thiên Trường
- V.League 1: 1st
- Vietnamese Cup: Round of 16
- Top goalscorer: League: Trần Ngọc Sơn (3); All: Trần Ngọc Sơn (3)
- Highest home attendance: 12,000 (v. Thể Công–Viettel, V.League 1, 31 October 2026)
- Lowest home attendance: 7,000 (v. Ninh Binh, V.League 1, 10 October 2026)
- Average home league attendance: 9,750
- Biggest win: 4–0 v. Hoang Anh Gia Lai (H); V.League 1, 6 September 2026; 4–0 v. Dong Nai City (A); V.League 1, 24 October 2026
- Biggest defeat: 0–3 v. SHB Da Nang (A); V.League 1, 11 September 2026
Home colours	Away colours
- All statistics correct as of 22 November 2026.

The 2026–27 season is the 62nd season in the history of Nam Định, and the club's 10th consecutive season in the top flight of Vietnamese football. In addition to the domestic league, the club is participating in this season's editions of the Vietnamese Cup

== Players ==
As of 3 September 2026

Note: Flags indicate national team as defined under FIFA eligibility rules; some limited exceptions apply. Players may hold more than one non-FIFA nationality.

No.	Pos.	Nation	Player
4	DF	VIE	Đàm Tiến Dũng
5	DF	VIE	Đặng Văn Tới
6	MF	VIE	A Mít
7	DF	VIE	Nguyễn Phong Hồng Duy
8	MF	BRA	Ezequiel
9	FW	VIE	Nguyễn Văn Toàn
10	MF	BRA	Caio César
11	MF	VIE	Nguyễn Tuấn Anh
13	DF	VIE	Trần Văn Kiên
14	FW	VIE	Nguyễn Xuân Son
17	DF	VIE	Nguyễn Văn Vĩ
19	MF	VIE	Trần Văn Đạt
20	DF	CAN	Tyler Crawford
22	MF	VIE	Trần Mạnh Quỳnh
23	GK	VIE	Lê Vũ Phong
26	GK	VIE	Trần Nguyên Mạnh (captain)

No.	Pos.	Nation	Player
27	FW	VIE	Trần Ngọc Sơn
28	MF	VIE	Tô Văn Vũ (vice-captain)
29	GK	VIE	Trần Đức Dũng
32	DF	VIE	Ngô Đức Huy
34	MF	VIE	Nguyễn Công Sơn
39	FW	VIE	Lâm Ti Phông
67	GK	VIE	Trịnh Xuân Hoàng
72	MF	BRA	Rômulo
77	MF	AUT	Van-Alessandro Nguyen Skyriotis
79	DF	VIE	Lê Văn Thành
82	GK	VIE	Trần Liêm Điều
88	MF	VIE	Lý Công Hoàng Anh
90	FW	VIE	Phạm Tuấn Hải
93	DF	CMR	Félix Eboa Eboa
98	DF	VIE	Giáp Tuấn Dương

== Transfers ==
=== In ===
Date	Pos.	Player	From	Fee	Ref.
1 July 2026	FW	(Palestine) Mahmoud Eid	(Vietnam) PVF-CAND	End of loan	
2 July 2026	GK	(Vietnam) Trịnh Xuân Hoàng	(Vietnam) Đông Á Thanh Hóa	Free	
2 July 2026	MF	(Vietnam) Trần Mạnh Quỳnh	(Vietnam) Sông Lam Nghệ An	Free	
2 July 2026	DF	(Vietnam) Đàm Tiến Dũng	(Vietnam) Hải Phòng	Free	
21 July 2026	FW	(Vietnam) Phạm Tuấn Hải	(Vietnam) Hà Nội	Undisclosed	
21 July 2026	DF	(United States) Reece Gaylor	(Sweden) AFC Eskilstuna	Free	
22 July 2026	DF	(Cameroon) Félix Eboa Eboa	(Bulgaria) Arda Kardzhali	Free	
22 July 2026	MF	(Vietnam) Nguyễn Công Sơn	(Vietnam) Ninh Bình	Free	
22 July 2026	MF	(Brazil) Ezequiel	(Serbia) Spartak Subotica	Free	
23 July 2026	DF	(Canada) Tyler Crawford	(United States) Vancouver FC	Free	
28 July 2026	MF	(Austria) Van-Alessandro Nguyen Skyriotis	(Austria) Wolfsberger AC II	Free	

=== Out ===
Date	Pos.	Player	To	Fee	Ref.
20 May 2026	FW	(England) Kyle Hudlin	TBC	Free	
20 May 2026	GK	(Brazil) Caíque	(Thailand) Uthai Thani	Free	
20 May 2026	MF	(South Africa) Njabulo Blom	(Indonesia) Borneo Samarinda	Free	
20 May 2026	DF	(Brazil) Wálber	(Indonesia) Persebaya Surabaya	Free	
21 May 2026	MF	(South Africa) Percy Tau	TBC	Free	
14 June 2026	MF	(Vietnam) Trần Văn Công	(Vietnam) Becamex HCMC	Free	
14 June 2026	FW	(Brazil) Brenner	(Vietnam) Bắc Ninh	Free	
14 June 2026	FW	(Democratic Republic of the Congo) Chadrac Akolo	(China) Beijing Guoan	Free	
25 June 2026	DF	(Brazil) Lucas Alves	(Vietnam) Thể Công–Viettel	Free	
25 June 2026	FW	(Palestine) Mahmoud Eid	(Vietnam) Công An Nhân Dân	Free	
25 June 2026	DF	(Netherlands) Mitchell Dijks	TBC	Free	
21 July 2026	DF	(France) Kevin Pham Ba	(Vietnam) Công An Hà Nội	End of loan	
21 July 2026	MF	(Democratic Republic of the Congo) Arnaud Lusamba	TBC	Free	
25 July 2026	DF	(Vietnam) Dương Thanh Hào	TBC	Free	
25 July 2026	DF	(Vietnam) Đinh Xuân Khải	(Vietnam) Xuân Thiện Phú Thọ	Loan	
25 July 2026	DF	(Vietnam) Nguyễn Đình Sơn	(Vietnam) Xuân Thiện Phú Thọ	Loan	
5 August 2026	MF	(Vietnam) Nguyễn Trọng Bảo	TBC	Free	
1 September 2026	DF	(United States) Reece Gaylor	(Vietnam) Bắc Ninh	Loan	
1 September 2026	FW	(France) Kalvin Luong	(Vietnam) SHB Đà Nẵng	Loan	

== Pre-season and friendlies ==
Win Draw Loss Fixtures

1 August 2026 Friendly	Thep Xanh Nam Dinh	1–1	Truong Tuoi Dong Nai	Ninh Bình
--:-- UTC+7	Đàm Tiến Dũng	Report	Lê Thanh Bình	Stadium: Thép Xanh Nam Định training ground

4 August 2026 Friendly	Cong An Hanoi	0–2	Thep Xanh Nam Dinh	Hưng Yên
--:-- UTC+7		Report	Ezequiel; Lý Công Hoàng Anh	Stadium: PVF Stadium

9 August 2026 Friendly	Thep Xanh Nam Dinh	2–1	Haiphong	Ninh Bình
--:-- UTC+7	Lâm Ti Phông; Lý Công Hoàng Anh	Report	?	Stadium: Thép Xanh Nam Định training ground

14 August 2026 Friendly	Thep Xanh Nam Dinh	2–2	Bac Ninh	Ninh Bình
--:-- UTC+7	Giáp Tuấn Dương; Ezequiel	*Report (TXNĐ): Report (BNFC)	Ngân Văn Đại; Trần Văn Trung	Stadium: Thép Xanh Nam Định training ground

15 August 2026 Friendly	Thep Xanh Nam Dinh	0–2	The Cong–Viettel	Hanoi
--:-- UTC+7		Report	?; ?	Stadium: Thể Công–Viettel training ground

23 August 2026 Friendly	Thep Xanh Nam Dinh	3–3	Hong Linh Ha Tinh	Ninh Bình
--:-- UTC+7	Ezequiel; César; Skyriotis	Report	?; ?; ?	Stadium: Thép Xanh Nam Định training ground

28 August 2026 Friendly	Thep Xanh Nam Dinh	1–2	Cong An Nhan Dan	Ninh Bình
18:00 UTC+7	Caio	Report	?; ?	Stadium: Thiên Trường Stadium

== Competitions ==
=== Overall record ===
Competition	First match	Last match	Starting round	Final position	Record							
Competition	First match	Last match	Starting round	Final position	Pld	W	D	L	GF	GA	GD	Win %
V.League 1	6 September 2026	8 May 2027	Matchday 1	22 May 2027	10	8	1	1	18	7	+11	80.00
Vietnamese Cup	2 January 2027		Round of 16		0	0	0	0	0	0	+0	—
Total					10	8	1	1	18	7	+11	80.00

Last updated: 22 November 2026
Source: Soccerway

=== V.League 1 ===
==== League table ====
Pos	Team	Pld	W	D	L	GF	GA	GD	Pts	Qualification or relegation
1	Thep Xanh Nam Dinh	8	6	1	1	18	7	+11	19	Qualification for the AFC Champions League Two group stage and ASEAN Club Championship group stage (Note: The winners of the 2026–27 Vietnamese Cup also qualify for the ASEAN Club Championship group stage. If the Vietnamese Cup winners is also the V.League 1 winners, the ASEAN Club Championship group stage spot will be passed to third-placed team.)
2	Song Lam Nghe An	8	3	5	0	13	7	+6	14	Qualification for the AFC Champions League Two qualifying play-offs
3	Cong An Hanoi	7	4	2	1	11	5	+6	14	
4	Ninh Binh	7	4	1	2	14	10	+4	13	
5	Thanh Hoa	8	3	3	2	11	11	0	12	

Updated to match(es) played on 21 November 2026. Source: VPF
Rules for classification: 1) Points; 2) Head-to-head points; 3) Head-to-head goal difference; 4) Head-to-head goals scored; 5) Goal difference; 6) Goals scored; 7) Away goals scored; 8) Disciplinary points.

==== Results summary ====
Overall								Home						Away					
Pld	W	D	L	GF	GA	GD	Pts	W	D	L	GF	GA	GD	W	D	L	GF	GA	GD
8	6	1	1	18	7	+11	19	3	1	0	10	3	+7	3	0	1	8	4	+4

Last updated: 22 November 2026.
Source: VPF

==== Results by round ====
Round	1	2	3	4	5	6	7	8	9	10	11	12	13	14	15	16	17	18	19	20	21	22	23	24	25	26
Ground	H	A	H	H	A	H	A	H	H	A	H	H	A	H	A	A	H	A	A	H	A	H	H	A	H	A
Result	W	L	L	W	W	W	W	W																		
Position	1	5	6	4	2	1	1	1	1																	

Updated to match(es) played on 22 November 2026. Source: VPF
A = Away; H = Home; W = Win; D = Draw; L = Loss

==== Matches ====
The league fixtures were drawn and released on 6 August 2026.

Win Draw Loss Fixtures

6 September 2026 1	Thep Xanh Nam Dinh	4–0	Hoang Anh Gia Lai	Ninh Bình
18:00	Ezequel (yellow card) 32', (goal) 37', 44'; Rômulo 45+2'; Crawford (yellow card) 64'; Nguyễn Xuân Son 90+3'	Report	Nguyễn Hữu Anh Tài (yellow card) 29'; Hà Châu Phi (yellow card) 54'	Stadium: Thiên Trường Stadium; Attendance: 11,000; Referee: Hoàng Ngọc Hà

11 September 2026 2	SHB Da Nang	0–3	Thep Xanh Nam Dinh	Đà Nẵng
18:00	Phan Văn Long (yellow card) 58'; Šaponjić 59'; Calleros 64'; Ly 74'	Report	Trần Văn Kiên (yellow card) 19'; Ezequiel (red card) 53'; Rômulo (red card) 62'	Stadium: Chi Lăng Stadium; Attendance: 7,000; Referee: Nguyễn Ngọc Tùng

10 October 2026 3	Thep Xanh Nam Dinh	1–1	Ninh Bình	Ninh Bình
18:00	Trần Văn Đạt (yellow card) 28'; Trần Mạnh Quỳnh 73'; Romulo (yellow card) 87'	Report	Nguyễn Hoàng Đức (yellow card) 47', (goal) 57'	Stadium: Thiên Trường Stadium; Attendance: 7,000; Referee: Hoàng Ngọc Hà

17 October 2026 4	Thanh Hoa	0–2	Thep Xanh Nam Dinh	Thanh Hóa
17:00	Đoàn Tuấn Cảnh (yellow card) 46'; Nguyễn Bá Tiến (yellow card) 65'	Report	Romulo (yellow card) 10'; Damoth 45+2' (o.g.); Félix (yellow card) 63'; Trần Mạnh Quỳnh (yellow card) 69'; Phạm Tuấn Hải 86'	Stadium: Thanh Hóa Stadium; Attendance: 6,000; Referee: Đỗ Anh Đức

24 October 2026 5	Dong Nai City	0–4	Thep Xanh Nam Dinh	Đồng Nai
18:00	Chu Văn Kiên (yellow card) 15'	Report	Trần Mạnh Quỳnh 47'; Trần Ngọc Sơn 56'; Giáp Tuấn Dương (yellow card) 58'; Lâm Ti Phông 60'; Nguyễn Văn Vĩ 90+3'	Stadium: Bình Phước Stadium; Attendance: 7,000; Referee: Mai Xuân Hùng

31 October 2026 6	Thep Xanh Nam Dinh	3–1	Thể Công–Viettel	Ninh Bình
18:00	Trần Ngọc Sơn 55', 90+6'; Crawford (yellow card) 60'; César 76'	Report	Natã 5'; Colonna (yellow card) 37'; Nguyễn Đức Hoàng Minh (yellow card) 44'; Paulinho (red card) 51'	Stadium: Thiên Trường Stadium; Attendance: 12,000; Referee: Lê Vũ Linh

6 November 2026 7	Hong Linh Ha Tinh	1–2	Thep Xanh Nam Dinh	Hà Tĩnh
18:00	Helerson (yellow card) 43'; Antônio (yellow card) 44', (goal) 83'; Bùi Văn Đức (yellow card) 76'	Report	César 31'; Nguyễn Phong Hồng Duy (red card) 56'; Nguyễn Văn Vĩ 90+4', (yellow card) 90+5'	Stadium: Hà Tĩnh Stadium; Attendance: 6,500; Referee: Nguyễn Trung Kiên

21 November 2026 8	Thep Xanh Nam Dinh	2–1	Haiphong	Ninh Bình
18:00	César 42' (pen.); Rômulo (yellow card) 45+2'; Trần Mạnh Quỳnh 57'	Report	Nguyễn Hữu Thái Bảo (red card) 19'; Makarić (yellow card) 45+2', (goal) 78'; Nguyễn Vũ Tín (yellow card) 75'	Stadium: Thiên Trường Stadium; Attendance: 9,000; Referee: Trần Ngọc Ánh

27 November 2026 9	Thep Xanh Nam Dinh	v	Cong An Hanoi	Ninh Bình
18:00		Report		Stadium: Thiên Trường Stadium

4 December 2026 10	Cong An Ho Chi Minh City	v	Thep Xanh Nam Dinh	Ho Chi Minh City
18:00		Report		Stadium: Bình Dương Stadium

6 November 2026 11	Thep Xanh Nam Dinh	v	Song Lam Nghe An	Ninh Bình
18:00		Report		Stadium: Thiên Trường Stadium

16 December 2026 12	Thep Xanh Nam Dinh	v	Bac Ninh	Ninh Bình
18:00		Report		Stadium: Thiên Trường Stadium

21 December 2026 13	Hanoi FC	v	Thep Xanh Nam Dinh	Hanoi
18:00		Report		Stadium: Hàng Đẫy Stadium

February 2027 14	Thep Xanh Nam Dinh	v	Thanh Hoa	Ninh Bình
18:00		Report		Stadium: Thiên Trường Stadium

February 2027 15	Bac Ninh	v	Thep Xanh Nam Dinh	Bắc Ninh
18:00		Report		Stadium: Việt Yên Stadium

March 2027 16	Ninh Binh	v	Thep Xanh Nam Dinh	Ninh Bình
18:00		Report		Stadium: Thiên Trường Stadium

March 2027 17	Thep Xanh Nam Dinh	v	Hanoi FC	Ninh Bình
18:00		Report		Stadium: Thiên Trường Stadium

March 2027 18	Cong An Hanoi	v	Thep Xanh Nam Dinh	Hanoi
19:15		Report		Stadium: Hàng Đẫy Stadium

April 2027 19	Haiphong	v	Thep Xanh Nam Dinh	Haiphong
18:00		Report		Stadium: Lạch Tray Stadium

April 2027 20	Thep Xanh Nam Dinh	v	Hong Linh Ha Tinh	Ninh Bình
18:00		Report		Stadium: Thiên Trường Stadium

April 2027 21	The Cong-Viettel	v	Thep Xanh Nam Dinh	Hanoi
19:15		Report		Stadium: Mỹ Đình Stadium

April 2027 22	Thep Xanh Nam Dinh	v	Dong Nai City	Ninh Bình
18:00		Report		Stadium: Thiên Trường Stadium

April 2027 23	Thep Xanh Nam Dinh	v	Cong An Ho Chi Minh City	Ninh Bình
18:00		Report		Stadium: Thiên Trường Stadium

May 2027 24	Song Lam Nghe An	v	Thep Xanh Nam Dinh	Nghệ An
18:00		Report		Stadium: Vinh Stadium

May 2027 25	Thep Xanh Nam Dinh	v	SHB Da Nang	Ninh Bình
18:00		Report		Stadium: Thiên Trường Stadium

8 May 2027 26	Hoang Anh Gia Lai	v	Thep Xanh Nam Dinh	Gia Lai
17:00		Report		Stadium: Pleiku Stadium

=== Vietnamese Cup ===
==== Matches ====
Win Draw Loss Fixtures

2 January 2027 Round of 16	Thep Xanh Nam Dinh	v	Xuan Thien Phu Tho	Ninh Bình
18:00		Report		Stadium: Thiên Trường Stadium

== Statistics ==
=== Appearances and goals ===
As of match played 22 November 2026

Players with no appearances are not included on the list; italics indicate a loaned in player

No.	Pos	Nat	Player	Total		V.League 1		Vietnamese Cup	
No.	Pos	Nat	Player	Apps	Goals	Apps	Goals	Apps	Goals
4	DF	(Vietnam) VIE	Đàm Tiến Dũng	1	0	1+0	0	0+0	0
5	DF	(Vietnam) VIE	Đặng Văn Tới	2	0	2+0	0	0+0	0
6	MF	(Vietnam) VIE	A Mít	5	0	5+0	0	0+0	0
7	DF	(Vietnam) VIE	Nguyễn Phong Hồng Duy	6	0	1+5	0	0+0	0
8	MF	(Brazil) BRA	Ezequiel	5	2	4+1	2	0+0	0
10	MF	(Brazil) BRA	Caio César	8	3	8+0	3	0+0	0
11	MF	(Vietnam) VIE	Nguyễn Tuấn Anh	7	0	0+7	0	0+0	0
13	DF	(Vietnam) VIE	Trần Văn Kiên	6	0	3+3	0	0+0	0
14	FW	(Vietnam) VIE	Nguyễn Xuân Son	1	1	0+1	1	0+0	0
17	MF	(Vietnam) VIE	Nguyễn Văn Vĩ	4	2	0+4	2	0+0	0
19	MF	(Vietnam) VIE	Trần Văn Đạt	3	0	1+2	0	0+0	0
20	DF	(Canada) CAN	Tyler Crawford	7	0	7+0	0	0+0	0
22	MF	(Vietnam) VIE	Trần Mạnh Quỳnh	8	3	7+1	3	0+0	0
26	GK	(Vietnam) VIE	Trần Nguyên Mạnh	8	0	8+0	0	0+0	0
27	FW	(Vietnam) VIE	Trần Ngọc Sơn	8	3	8+0	3	0+0	0
28	MF	(Vietnam) VIE	Tô Văn Vũ	3	0	1+2	0	0+0	0
39	FW	(Vietnam) VIE	Lâm Ti Phông	5	1	4+1	1	0+0	0
72	MF	(Vietnam) VIE	Rômulo	7	1	7+0	1	0+0	0
77	MF	(Austria) AUT	Van-Alessandro Nguyen Skyriotis	5	0	0+5	0	0+0	0
88	MF	(Vietnam) VIE	Lý Công Hoàng Anh	7	0	2+5	0	0+0	0
90	FW	(Vietnam) VIE	Phạm Tuấn Hải	7	1	7+0	1	0+0	0
93	DF	(Cameroon) CMR	Félix Eboa Eboa	8	0	8+0	0	0+0	0
98	DF	(Vietnam) VIE	Giáp Tuấn Dương	6	0	6+0	0	0+0	0

=== Goalscorers ===
The list is sorted by squad number when total goals are equal.

Rank	No.	Pos.	Nat.	Player	V.League 1	Vietnamese Cup	Total
1	10	MF	(Brazil)	Caio César	3	0	3
1	22	MF	(Vietnam)	Trần Mạnh Quỳnh	3	0	3
1	27	FW	(Vietnam)	Trần Ngọc Sơn	3	0	3
2	8	MF	(Brazil)	Ezequiel	2	0	2
2	17	MF	(Vietnam)	Nguyễn Văn Vĩ	2	0	2
3	14	FW	(Vietnam)	Nguyễn Xuân Son	1	0	1
3	39	FW	(Vietnam)	Lâm Ti Phông	1	0	1
3	72	MF	(Brazil)	Rômulo	1	0	1
3	90	FW	(Vietnam)	Phạm Tuấn Hải	1	0	1
Own goals					1	0	1
Totals					18	0	18

Last updated: 22 November 2026.
Source: Competitions
