= Phạm Tuấn Hải =

Vietnamese footballer (born 1998)

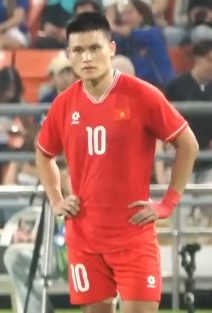
- Tuấn Hải at the 2024 ASEAN Championship final

Personal information
- Full name: Phạm Tuấn Hải
- Date of birth: 19 May 1998 (age 28)
- Place of birth: Phủ Lý, Hà Nam, Vietnam
- Height: 1.72 m (5 ft 8 in)
- Positions: Forward; winger

Team information
- Current team: Thép Xanh Nam Định
- Number: 90

Youth career
- 2010–2017: Hà Nội

Senior career*
Years	Team	Apps	(Gls)
2014	→ Công An Nhân Dân B (loan)	5	(1)
2015–2022	Hồng Lĩnh Hà Tĩnh	91	(45)
2022–2026	Hà Nội	112	(34)
2026–	Thép Xanh Nam Định	8	(1)

International career^{‡}
2016	Vietnam U19	6	(0)
2021–	Vietnam	41	(10)
Medal record
Men's football
Representing Vietnam
ASEAN Championship
Runner-up	ASEAN 2022	Team
Winner	ASEAN 2024	Team
- * Club domestic league appearances and goals as of 21 November 2026 ‡ National team caps and goals as of 19 November 2025

Phạm Tuấn Hải (born 19 May 1998) is a Vietnamese professional footballer who plays as a forward or a winger for V.League 1 club Thép Xanh Nam Định and the Vietnam national team.

== Club career ==
=== Hồng Lĩnh Hà Tinh ===
Coming through the Hà Nội youth system, Tuấn Hải began his senior career at Hà Nội B. The club later became Hồng Lĩnh Hà Tĩnh. For the club, Tuấn Hải made 105 official appearances and scored 55 goals across seven seasons.

=== Hà Nội ===
In December 2021, Tuấn Hải returned to former club, Hà Nội, on a three-year contract. He made his competitive debut for Hanoi on 12 March 2022 against Hồ Chí Minh City in the V.League 1, which ended in a goalless draw. On 7 April, he scored a brace in a 4–0 win over Công An Nhân Dân in the Vietnamese Cup. He scored his first V.League 1 goal for Hanoi with a header against Sài Gòn in a 3–1 home win on 20 July.

On 24 October 2023, Tuấn Hải scored his first goal in the 2023–24 AFC Champions League group stage fixtures in a 2–1 away lost to Chinese club, Wuhan Three Towns. He was on the scoresheet again in the reverse fixture at the Mỹ Đình National Stadium on 8 November, when he scored a brace helping his team to win the game 2–1 . During the league match on 24 November, Tuấn Hải scored from inside his own half with a match-winning strike from 10 yards behind the halfway line to lob Becamex Bình Dương goalkeeper Trần Minh Toàn. On 6 December, he scored the winning goal against the 2022 AFC Champions League champions, Urawa Red Diamonds in a 2–1 win which bowed the defending champions from the competition itself and suffered their first ever loss to an ASEAN team in 16 years.

=== Thép Xanh Nam Định ===
On 21 July 2026, Tuấn Hải was transferred to Thép Xanh Nam Định and signed a three-year contract with the team.

== International career ==
Tuấn Hải made his debut for the Vietnam national team in a FIFA World Cup qualifying match against Oman on 12 October 2021. On 1 June 2022, he scored his first senior goals, a brace, in a 2–0 victory over Afghanistan in a friendly match.

In December 2022, Tuấn Hải was named in Vietnam's final 23-man squad by Park Hang-seo for the 2022 AFF Championship, making his first appearance in the competition by playing 13 minutes in the 6–0 group stage victory against Laos.

On 4 January 2024, Tuấn Hải was named in Vietnam's squad for the 2023 AFC Asian Cup. He scored in the team's 2–4 lost to Japan on 14 January.

On 6 June 2024, Tuấn Hải scored a 90+5 stoppage time winner against Philippines in a 3–2 win during the 2026 FIFA World Cup qualification match.

On 5 January 2025, Tuân Hải scored the opening goal for Vietnam, giving them a 1–0 lead in the second leg of the 2024 ASEAN Championship final. Later in the game, his shot in the 82nd minute caused Thai national team player Pansa to score an own goal to level the score at 2-2. Vietnam went on to win the competition and got their third ASEAN Championship title.

== Career statistics ==
=== Club ===
As of match played 21 November 2026

Appearances and goals by club, season and competition
Club	Season	League			Cup		Continental		Other		Total	
Club	Season	Division	Apps	Goals	Apps	Goals	Apps	Goals	Apps	Goals	Apps	Goals
Công An Nhân Dân B	2014	Third Division	5	1	—		—		—		5	1
Hồng Lĩnh Hà Tĩnh	2015	Third Division	5	5	—		—		1 (Note: Appearance in Third Division promotion play-off)	0	6	5
Hồng Lĩnh Hà Tĩnh	2016	Second Division	11	6	—		—		—		11	6
Hồng Lĩnh Hà Tĩnh	2017	Second Division	13	11	—		—		2 (Note: Appearance in Second Division promotion play-off)	4	15	15
Hồng Lĩnh Hà Tĩnh	2018	V.League 2	15	9	0	0	—		1 (Note: Appearance in V.League 1 promotion play-off)	0	16	9
Hồng Lĩnh Hà Tĩnh	2019	V.League 2	20	12	1	1	—		—		21	13
Hồng Lĩnh Hà Tĩnh	2020	V.League 1	20	3	3	0	—		—		23	3
Hồng Lĩnh Hà Tĩnh	2021	V.League 1	12	4	1	0	—		—		13	4
Hồng Lĩnh Hà Tĩnh	Total		96	50	5	1	0	0	4	4	105	55
Hà Nội	2022	V.League 1	24	10	5	3	—		—		29	13
Hà Nội	2023	V.League 1	20	6	1	1	—		1 (Note: Appearance in Vietnamese Super Cup)	0	22	7
Hà Nội	2023–24	V.League 1	25	9	3	0	6 (Note: Appearances in AFC Champions League)	4	—		34	13
Hà Nội	2024–25	V.League 1	21	5	0	0	—		—		21	5
Hà Nội	2025–26	V.League 1	22	4	1	0	—		—		23	4
Hà Nội	Total		112	34	10	4	6	4	1	0	129	42
Thép Xanh Nam Định	2026–27	V.League 1	8	1	0	0	—		—		8	1
Career total			221	86	15	5	6	4	5	4	247	99

=== International ===
As of match played 26 March 2026

Appearances and goals by national team and year
National team	Year	Apps	Goals
Vietnam	2021	1	0
Vietnam	2022	10	2
Vietnam	2023	13	2
Vietnam	2024	10	3
Vietnam	2025	6	2
Vietnam	2026	1	1
Total		41	10

Scores and results list Vietnam's goal tally first, score column indicates score after each Tuấn Hải goal.

List of international goals scored by Phạm Tuấn Hải
No.	Date	Venue	Opponent	Score	Result	Competition
1	1 June 2022	Thống Nhất Stadium, Ho Chi Minh City, Vietnam	Afghanistan	1–0	2–0	Friendly
2	1 June 2022	Thống Nhất Stadium, Ho Chi Minh City, Vietnam	Afghanistan	2–0	2–0	Friendly
3	20 June 2023	Thiên Trường Stadium, Nam Định, Vietnam	Syria	1–0	1–0	Friendly
4	11 September 2023	Thiên Trường Stadium, Nam Định, Vietnam	Palestine	2–0	2–0	Friendly
5	14 January 2024	Al Thumama Stadium, Doha, Qatar	Japan	2–1	2–4	2023 AFC Asian Cup
6	6 June 2024	Mỹ Đình National Stadium, Hanoi, Vietnam	Philippines	3–2	3–2	2026 FIFA World Cup qualification
7	11 June 2024	Basra International Stadium, Basra, Iraq	Iraq	1–2	1–3	2026 FIFA World Cup qualification
8	5 January 2025	Rajamangala Stadium, Bangkok, Thailand	Thailand	1–0	3–2	2024 ASEAN Championship
9	19 November 2025	New Laos National Stadium, Vientiane, Laos	Laos	2–0	2–0	2027 AFC Asian Cup qualification
10	26 March 2026	Hàng Đẫy Stadium, Hanoi, Vietnam	Bangladesh	1–0	3–0	Friendly

== Honours ==
Hồng Lĩnh Hà Tĩnh

- V.League 2: 2019

Hà Nội

- V.League 1: 2022
- Vietnamese National Cup: 2022
- Vietnamese Super Cup: 2022

Vietnam

- ASEAN Championship: 2024

Individual

- Vietnamese Silver Ball: 2023
- V.League 1 Player of the Month: October 2022
- V.League 1 Goal of the Month: October 2022, October 2023
- V.League 1 Squad of the season: 2022, 2023
- V.League 1 Goal of the season: 2022
- V.League 1 Team of the Season: 2023
