= Who is the Champion? =

Who Is the Champion?
- Directed by: Vũ Kim Dũng
- Written by: Vũ Kim Dũng; Trần Thanh Việt
- Music by: Nguyễn Quang Vinh
- Production company: Hanoi Film Productions
- Distributed by: Hanoi Film Productions
- Release date: 2003
- Running time: 5 minutes
- Country: Vietnam
- Language: Vietnamese
- Budget: ₫40 millions

Who Is the Champion? (Vietnamese : Ai là nhà vô địch ?) is a 2003 Vietnamese computer-animated sport film produced by Hanoi Film Productions.

== Plot ==
A golden buffalo and a brown bear compete in weightlifting to see who will become the 2003 Southeast Asian Games champion.

== Music ==
The song "For the world of tomorrow" was composed by Nguyễn Quang Vinh and sung by Linh Dung.
