= Lê Quang Long =

Vietnamese footballer (born 1980)

Personal information
- Date of birth: 26 May 1980 (age 46)
- Place of birth: Hanoi, Vietnam
- Position: Defender

Senior career*
Years	Team	Apps	(Gls)
1999–2003	Hà Nội ACB		
2004–2005	CLB Hoa Phat		
2006–2008	Than Quảng Ninh		
2008–2010	Hà Nội ACB	31	(0)
2010–2012	Navibank Sài Gòn	8	(0)
2013	GĐT Long An		
- * Club domestic league appearances and goals

Lê Quang Long (born 26 May 1980) is a Vietnamese former footballer who played as a defender.

== Career ==
He started his career with Hà Nội FC. In 2002, he suffered a spine injury. In 2006, he signed for Than Quang Ninh FC. In 2007, he returned to Hà Nội FC. He helped the club achieve promotion. In 2011, he signed for Navibank Sài Gòn. He made thirty-one league appearances and scored zero goals while playing for the club. He helped them win the 2011 Vietnamese Cup. In 2013, he signed for Long An FC. He made eight league appearances and scored zero goals while playing for the club.

He was a Vietnam youth international. He played for the Vietnam national under-18 football team and captained the team. He mainly operated as a defender. He is left-footed. He is known for his crossing ability.

== Personal life ==
He was born on 26 May 1980 in Hanoi. After retiring from professional football, he worked as a youth manager. He has also worked in the television industry.
