= Trịnh Xuân Hoàng =

Vietnamese footballer

Personal information
- Full name: Trịnh Xuân Hoàng
- Date of birth: 6 November 2000 (age 26)
- Place of birth: Thanh Hóa, Vietnam
- Height: 1.84 m (6 ft 0 in)
- Position: Goalkeeper

Team information
- Current team: Thép Xanh Nam Định
- Number: 67

Youth career
- 2014–2021: Thanh Hóa

Senior career*
Years	Team	Apps	(Gls)
2020–2026	Đông Á Thanh Hóa	53	(0)
2026–	Thép Xanh Nam Định	0	(0)

International career^{‡}
2021–2022	Vietnam U23	3	(0)
Medal record
Men's football
Representing Vietnam
AFF U-23 Championship
Winner	Cambodia 2022	Team
- * Club domestic league appearances and goals as of 7 June 2026 ‡ National team caps and goals as of 23 February 2022

Trịnh Xuân Hoàng (born 6 November 2000) is a Vietnamese professional footballer who plays as a goalkeeper for V.League 1 club Thép Xanh Nam Định.

== Club career ==
Born in Thanh Hóa, Xuân Hoàng was a product of his local team Thanh Hóa FC. He was promoted to the Thanh Hóa first team for the second part of the 2020 season, becoming the third choice goalkeeper. He made his professional debut against SHB Đà Nẵng on 6 July 2020 and conceded 3 goals in a 0–3 home defeat. He remained unused in the first team for the next two years and made his return on 31 October 2022, again SHB Đà Nẵng in a 3–3 draw.

In the 2023–24 season, Xuân Hoàng was chosen to be the starter keeper for the team. He started in the 2023–24 Vietnamese Cup final against Hanoi FC and kept a clean sheet as the game ended in a goalless draw, leading the game to the penalty shootout. There, he saved 2 penalties, thus help Thanh Hóa win the title for the second Vietnamese Cup title in their history.

On 2 July 2026, Xuân Hoàng joined league fellow Thép Xanh Nam Định.

== International career ==
In January 2022, Xuân Hoàng was called up to the Vietnam U23 squad for the 2022 AFF U-23 Championship. After starting goalkeeper Y Êli Niê tested positive for COVID-19, he played in the last group stage game against Thailand, before he himself contracted the virus and was dropped from the squad. His teammates later secured the title after the defeating Thailand again in the final.

He was named in the preliminary squad for the 2021 SEA Games but was not selected in the final squad.

In August 2024, Xuân Hoàng received his first call up to the Vietnam national team, being part of the squad for the 2024 LPBank Cup.

== Honours ==
Đông Á Thanh Hóa

- Vietnamese Cup: 2023, 2023–24
- Vietnamese Super Cup: 2023

Vietnam U23

- AFF U-23 Championship: 2022
