= Kyle Hudlin =

English footballer (born 2000)

Personal information
- Full name: Kyle Farren Hudlin
- Date of birth: 15 June 2000 (age 26)
- Place of birth: Birmingham, England
- Height: 6 ft 9 in (2.06 m)
- Position: Striker

Team information
- Current team: Harborough Town
- Number: 25

Senior career*
Years	Team	Apps	(Gls)
- Castle Vale Town
–2020	Boldmere Sports & Social Falcons		
2020	Solihull United		
2020–2022	Solihull Moors	58	(13)
2022–2025	Huddersfield Town	9	(0)
2022–2023	→ AFC Wimbledon (loan)	13	(0)
2024	→ Burton Albion (loan)	5	(0)
2024–2025	→ Newport County (loan)	27	(6)
2025–2026	Thep Xanh Nam Dinh	5	(0)
2026–	Harborough Town	0	(0)
- * Club domestic league appearances and goals as of 20 May 2026

Kyle Farren Hudlin (born 15 June 2000) is an English professional footballer who plays as a striker for Harborough Town.

== Career ==
Hudlin was born in Birmingham. He began his career with Midland Football League clubs Castle Vale Town, Boldmere Sports & Social Falcons and Solihull United, before signing for Solihull Moors in October 2020. During his time with the club, he scored 13 goals in 58 National League games and 17 in 69 games in all competitions. In July 2021 The Athletic reported that Manchester City, Middlesbrough and Cardiff City were interested in Hudlin.

In July 2022, he signed for Huddersfield Town on a two-year contract, initially joining their B team. Later that month he moved on loan to AFC Wimbledon. He scored his first goal for Wimbledon in an EFL Trophy tie against Crawley Town on 20 September 2022. Hudlin was recalled by Huddersfield on 4 January 2023.

Hudlin scored on his debut for Huddersfield in a 3–2 loss to Middlesbrough in the EFL Cup on 8 August 2023.

On 31 January 2024, Hudlin joined League One club Burton Albion on loan for the remainder of the season.

On 30 August 2024, Hudlin joined League Two club Newport County on loan until January 2025. He made his debut for Newport on 3 September 2024 in the 2–1 EFL Trophy defeat to Cheltenham Town. Hudlin scored his first goal for Newport on 2 October 2024 in the 3–1 League Two win against Salford City. On 2 January 2025, the loan was extended for the remainder of the season. On 23 June 2025, the club announced the player would be leaving by mutual consent.

On 18 July 2025, he moved to Vietnam, signing for V.League 1 side Thep Xanh Nam Dinh.

Hudlin trialled with Carlisle United in pre-season in July 2026. On 5 November 2026, Hudlin joined National League North club Harborough Town.

== Personal life ==
Hudlin is recognised as being one of the tallest footballers in the world with a height of 6 feet 9 inches (2.06 m).

== Career statistics ==
As of match played 20 May 2026

Appearances and goals by club, season and competition
Club	Season	League			National cup (Note: Includes FA Cup, Vietnamese Cup)		League cup (Note: Includes EFL Cup)		Other		Total	
Club	Season	Division	Apps	Goals	Apps	Goals	Apps	Goals	Apps	Goals	Apps	Goals
Solihull Moors	2020–21	National League	35	9	2	1	—		2 (Note: Appearance(s) in FA Trophy)	2	39	12
Solihull Moors	2021–22	National League	23	4	2	0	—		5 (Note: Three appearances in FA Trophy, two appearances and one goal in National League play-offs)	1	30	5
Solihull Moors	Total		58	13	4	1	0	0	7	3	69	17
Huddersfield Town	2022–23	Championship	0	0	0	0	0	0	0	0	0	0
Huddersfield Town	2023–24	Championship	9	0	0	0	1	1	0	0	10	1
Huddersfield Town	2024–25	League One	0	0	0	0	0	0	0	0	0	0
Huddersfield Town	Total		9	0	0	0	1	1	0	0	10	1
AFC Wimbledon (loan)	2022–23	League Two	13	0	0	0	1	0	4 (Note: Appearance(s) in EFL Trophy)	4	18	4
Burton Albion (loan)	2023–24	League One	5	0	0	0	0	0	0	0	5	0
Newport County (loan)	2024–25	League Two	27	6	1	0	0	0	2	0	30	6
Thép Xanh Nam Định	2025–26	V.League 1	5	0	0	0	—		5 (Note: Four appearances and one goal in AFC Champions League Two, one appearance and two goals in Vietnamese Super Cup)	3	10	3
Career total			116	19	5	1	2	1	17	10	140	31
