= Caíque (footballer, born 1997) =

Brazilian footballer

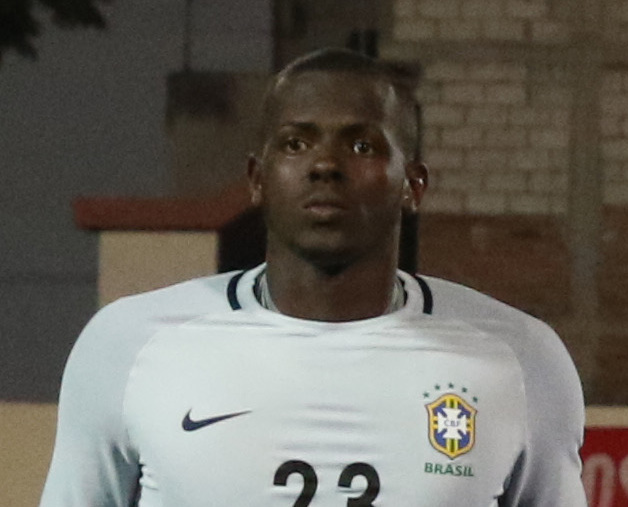

Personal information
- Full name: Caíque Luiz Santos da Purificação
- Date of birth: 31 July 1997 (age 29)
- Place of birth: Salvador, Brazil
- Height: 1.98 m (6 ft 6 in)
- Position: Goalkeeper

Team information
- Current team: Uthai Thani

Youth career
- Vitória

Senior career*
Years	Team	Apps	(Gls)
2015–2022	Vitória	39	(0)
2020	→ CSA (loan)	1	(0)
2020–2021	→ Ermis Aradippou (loan)	30	(0)
2022	→ Rochester NY (loan)	24	(0)
2023	Ypiranga-RS	26	(0)
2023–2024	Grêmio	13	(0)
2025	Criciúma	10	(0)
2025–2026	Thep Xanh Nam Dinh	0	(0)
2026–	Uthai Thani	0	(0)

International career
2017–2019	Brazil U20	4	(0)
- * Club domestic league appearances and goals as of 18 June 2024

Caíque Luiz Santos da Purificação (born 31 July 1997), simply known as Caíque, is a Brazilian professional footballer who plays as a goalkeeper for Thai League 1 club Uthai Thani.

== Career ==
On 15 February 2022, Caíque went on loan to MLS Next Pro independent side Rochester New York FC ahead of the 2022 season.

On 11 August 2025, Cáique moved to Vietnam, signing for Thep Xanh Nam Dinh.

== Career statistics ==
As of 20 May 2026

Appearances and goals by club, season and competition
Club	Season	League			State league		National cup		Continental		Other		Total	
Club	Season	Division	Apps	Goals	Apps	Goals	Apps	Goals	Apps	Goals	Apps	Goals	Apps	Goals
Vitória	2015	Série B	0	0	—	—	—	—	—	—	—	—	0	0
Vitória	2016	Série A	8	0	5 (Note: Appearances in the Campeonato Baiano)	0	3 (Note: Appearances in the Copa do Brasil)	0	0	0	—	—	16	0
Vitória	2017	Série A	9	0	5	0	0	0	—	—	0	0	14	0
Vitória	2018	Série A	5	0	2	0	4	0	—	—	3 (Note: Appearances in the Copa do Nordeste)	0	14	0
Vitória	2019	Série B	3	0	2	0	0	0	—	—	2	0	7	0
Vitória	2020	Série B	—	—	—	—	—	—	—	—	0	0	0	0
Vitória	2021	Série B	0	0	—	—	0	0	—	—	—	—	0	0
Vitória	2022	Série C	—	—	0	0	—	—	—	—	0	0	0	0
Vitória	Total		25	0	14	0	7	0	0	0	5	0	49	0
CSA (loan)	2020	Série B	—	—	1 (Note: Appearance in the Campeonato Alagoano)	0	1	0	—	—	1	0	3	0
Ermis Aradippou (loan)	2020/21	Cypriot First Division	30	0	—	—	1 (Note: Appearance in the Cypriot Cup)	0	—	—	—	—	31	0
Rochester New York (loan)	2022	MLS Next Pro	24	0	—	—	1 (Note: Appearance in the U.S. Open Cup)	0	—	—	1 (Note: Appearance in the MLS Next Pro Playoffs)	0	26	0
Ypiranga-RS	2023	Série C	15	0	11 (Note: Appearances in the Campeonato Gaúcho)	0	4	0	—	—	—	—	30	0
Grêmio	2023	Série A	4	0	—	—	0	0	—	—	—	—	4	0
Grêmio	2024	Série A	6	0	8	0	1	0	0	0	—	—	15	0
Grêmio	Total		10	0	8	0	1	0	0	0	—	—	19	0
Criciúma	2025	Série B	0	0	10 (Note: Appearances in the Campeonato Catarinense)	0	2	0	—	—	—	—	12	0
Thep Xanh Nam Dinh	2025–26	V.League 1	0	0	—	—	0	0	6 (Note: Appearances in the AFC Champions League Two)	0	2 (Note: Appearances in the ASEAN Club Championship)	0	8	0
Career Total			104	0	44	0	17	0	6	0	9	0	180	0

== Honours ==
Grêmio

- Campeonato Gaúcho: 2024
