= Đàm Tiến Dũng =

Vietnamese footballer (born 1996)

Personal information
- Full name: Đàm Tiến Dũng
- Date of birth: 10 January 1996 (age 30)
- Place of birth: Thanh Hóa, Vietnam
- Height: 1.74 m (5 ft 9 in)
- Position: Left-back

Team information
- Current team: Thép Xanh Nam Định
- Number: 4

Youth career
- 2006–2008: Thanh Hóa
- 2009–2017: Viettel

Senior career*
Years	Team	Apps	(Gls)
2017–2021	Viettel	28	(0)
2021	→ Topenland Bình Định (loan)	2	(0)
2022–2023	Đông Á Thanh Hóa	31	(1)
2023–2026	Hải Phòng	42	(0)
2026–	Thép Xanh Nam Định	0	(0)

International career
2016–2017	Vietnam U21	2	(0)
- * Club domestic league appearances and goals as of 7 June 2026

Đàm Tiến Dũng (born 10 January 1996) is a Vietnamese professional footballer who plays as a left back for V.League 1 team Thép Xanh Nam Định.

== Career ==
=== Viettel ===
Born in Thanh Hóa, Tiến Dũng joined the youth team of Viettel at the age of 13. He was part of the Viettel squad that promoted from the Vietnamese National Football Second League in 2015 and V.League 2 in 2016. On 29 September 2018, Tiến Dũng assisted twice in Viettel's 2–0 V.League 1 win against Bình Phước. Following this victory, Viettel officially won the 2018 V.League 2 and won a promotion to the 2019 V.League 1. In the 2020 season, Viettel were crowned as V.League 1 champions but Tiến Dũng didn't made any appearance during the season.

=== Topenland Bình Đinh ===
He was loaned to Topenland Bình Định for the 2021 season but appeared only twice as the league was cancelled to the COVID-19 situation in Vietnam.

=== Đông Á Thanh Hóa ===
He joined his hometown team Đông Á Thanh Hóa in the 2022 season. He was a crucially starter for his team throughout the season and displayed several outstanding performances. Tiến Dũng featured in the 2022 V.League 1 Team of the Season. In the 2023 season, he missed a big part of the first half of the season due to an injury but later played a big role helping his team win the Vietnamese Cup.

=== Hải Phòng ===
In September 2023, Tiến Dũng joined Hải Phòng. He scored twice in the team's 2023–24 AFC Cup group stage, both against Sabah in a 3–2 win.

=== Thép Xanh Nam Định ===
On 2 July 2026, Tiến Dũng was transferred to Thép Xanh Nam Định.

== Honours ==
Viettel

- V.League 2: 2018
- V.League 1: 2020

Dông Á Thanh Hóa

- Vietnamese Cup: 2023

=== Individual ===
- V.League 1 Team of the Season: 2022
