= Trần Văn Kiên =

Vietnamese footballer

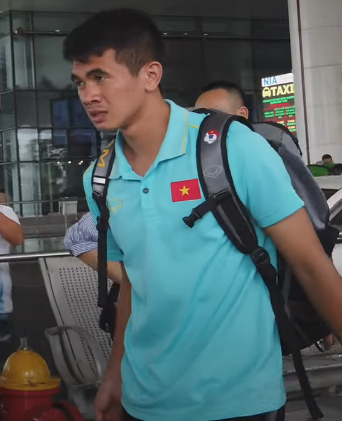
- Văn Kiên in 2019

Personal information
- Full name: Trần Văn Kiên
- Date of birth: 13 May 1996 (age 30)
- Place of birth: Nghĩa Đàn, Nghệ An, Vietnam
- Height: 1.68 m (5 ft 6 in)
- Position: Right-back

Team information
- Current team: Thép Xanh Nam Định
- Number: 13

Youth career
- 2009–2011: Sông Lam Nghệ An
- 2011: T&T Văn Sỹ Hùng Football Center
- 2011–2015: Hà Nội

Senior career*
Years	Team	Apps	(Gls)
2014	→ Công An Nhân Dân (loan)		
2015	→ Hà Nội (2011) (loan)	2	(0)
2016–2023	Hà Nội	153	(3)
2023–	Thép Xanh Nam Định	55	(1)

International career^{‡}
2015–2016	Vietnam U21	1	(0)
2017–2018	Vietnam U22	3	(0)
2019	Vietnam	1	(0)
- * Club domestic league appearances and goals as of 7 June 2026 ‡ National team caps and goals as of 9 June 2019

Trần Văn Kiên (born 13 May 1996) is a Vietnamese professional footballer who plays as a right-back for V.League 1 club Thép Xanh Nam Định.

== Honours ==
Hà Nội (2011)

- V.League 2: 2015

Hà Nội

- V.League 1: 2016, 2018, 2019, 2022; Runner-up: 2020
- Vietnamese National Cup: 2019, 2020, 2022; Runner-up: 2016
- Vietnamese Super Cup: 2019, 2020, 2021; Runner-up: 2016, 2017

Thép Xanh Nam Định

- V.League 1: 2023–24, 2024–25
- Vietnamese Super Cup: 2024

Vietnam

- King's Cup: Runner-up 2019
