= Lâm Ti Phông =

Vietnamese footballer (born 1996)

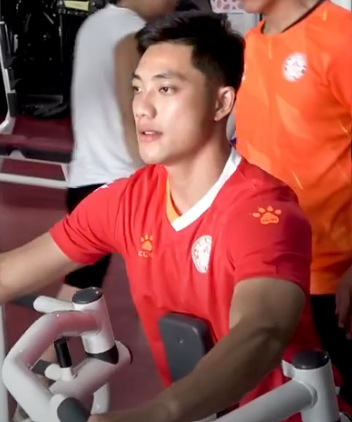
- Lâm Ti Phông in 2022

Personal information
- Full name: Lâm Ti Phông
- Date of birth: February 1, 1996 (age 30)
- Place of birth: Sơn Tịnh, Quảng Ngãi, Vietnam
- Height: 1.70 m (5 ft 7 in)
- Position: Winger

Team information
- Current team: Thép Xanh Nam Định
- Number: 39

Youth career
- 2011–2014: Sanna Khánh Hòa BVN

Senior career*
Years	Team	Apps	(Gls)
2015–2020	Sanna Khánh Hòa BVN	85	(17)
2020–2022	Hồ Chí Minh City	32	(3)
2023–2025	Đông Á Thanh Hóa	41	(5)
2025–	Thép Xanh Nam Định	23	(4)

International career
2014–2015	Vietnam U19	13	(16)
2015–2016	Vietnam U21	3	(2)
2016–2017	Vietnam U23	2	(0)
- * Club domestic league appearances and goals as of 7 June 2026

Lâm Ti Phông (born 1 February 1996) is a Vietnamese professional footballer who plays as a winger for V.League 1 club Thép Xanh Nam Định.

== Club career ==
Ti Phông began his professional career with Khánh Hòa. He joined Hồ Chí Minh City in 2020, before Đông Á Thanh Hóa signed him in December 2022.

Ti Phông joined Thép Xanh Nam Định in March 2025.

== International career ==
Ti Phông played represented Vietnam internationally in several youth categories such as under-19, under-21 and under-23.

== Personal life ==
Lâm Ti Phông's name came from his father's fascination with Thai former professional footballer Natipong Sritong-In.

== Honours ==
Đông Á Thanh Hóa

- Vietnamese Cup: 2023, 2023–24
- Vietnamese Super Cup: 2023

Thép Xanh Nam Định

- V.League 1: 2024–25

Individual

- V.League 1 Team of the Season: 2023
