= Caio César =

Brazilian actor, voice actor and police officer

- Born: Caio César Ignácio Cardoso de Melo; September 28, 1988; Rio de Janeiro, Brazil
- Died: September 30, 2015 (aged 27); Rio de Janeiro
- Occupations: Actor, police officer
- Years active: 1997–2015

Caio César Ignácio Cardoso de Melo (September 28, 1988 – September 30, 2015) was a Brazilian actor and police officer. César provided the Brazilian Portuguese voiceover of Harry Potter (played by Daniel Radcliffe) in all eight of the Harry Potter films from 2001 to 2011.

== Career ==
César landed his first job as a voiceover artist as the lead in the sitcom Smart Guy.

He was best known for providing the Brazilian Portuguese voice of Daniel Radcliffe's Harry Potter in each of the eight films in the Harry Potter series from 2001 to 2011. Brazilian actress Luisa Palomanes played Hermione Granger, while actor Charles Emmanuel provided the voice of Ron Weasley in the eight films in the series.

In addition to Harry Potter, César provided the Brazilian voice of Takeru "T.K." Takaishi in the Digimon Adventure animated series, Diego (played onscreen by Christopher Uckermann) in the Mexican telenovela Rebelde, Jimmy in Ed, Edd n Eddy, Otto Rocket in Rocket Power, Max in Dragon Tales, Olie Polie in Rolie Polie Olie, Boots in Dora the Explorer, Otto Osworth in Time Squad, Josh Spitz in Braceface, Snap in ChalkZone and Sokka in Avatar: The Last Airbender. He eventually became a police officer in Rio de Janeiro as his full-time career, while continuing to pursue voiceover roles as a side project.

== Death ==
On September 30, 2015, César was shot in the neck while he and other police officers were conducting a routine patrol of Complexo do Alemão, one of the largest favelas, or shanty towns, in Rio de Janeiro. He was taken to Hospital Estadual Getúlio Vargas in Rio's North Zone, where he underwent emergency surgery. However, César succumbed to his injuries at the age of 27, leaving behind one child. His death was confirmed by both the Military Police and Warner Brothers Studios.

César was the ninth police officer to be killed in Rio de Janeiro's favelas in 2015, while approximately 80 police have been shot in the city overall that year.

=== Tributes ===
J. K. Rowling, author of the Harry Potter series, tweeted her condolences upon learning of César's murder, writing:

Desperately sad to hear that Caio César, Brazilian voice of Harry Potter, has died at the age of 27. My thoughts are with his family.

César's co-star, Charles Emmanuel, who voiced Ron Weasley in the films, also paid tribute to him, saying:

Everyone has heard the voice of Caio César at some point. I've had the opportunity to work with him several times, because we are the same generation of voice actors. He was a runt, skinny, but he grew up and went on to become a policeman and turned into a father. He became a man.
