= Lý Công Hoàng Anh =

Vietnamese footballer (born 1999)

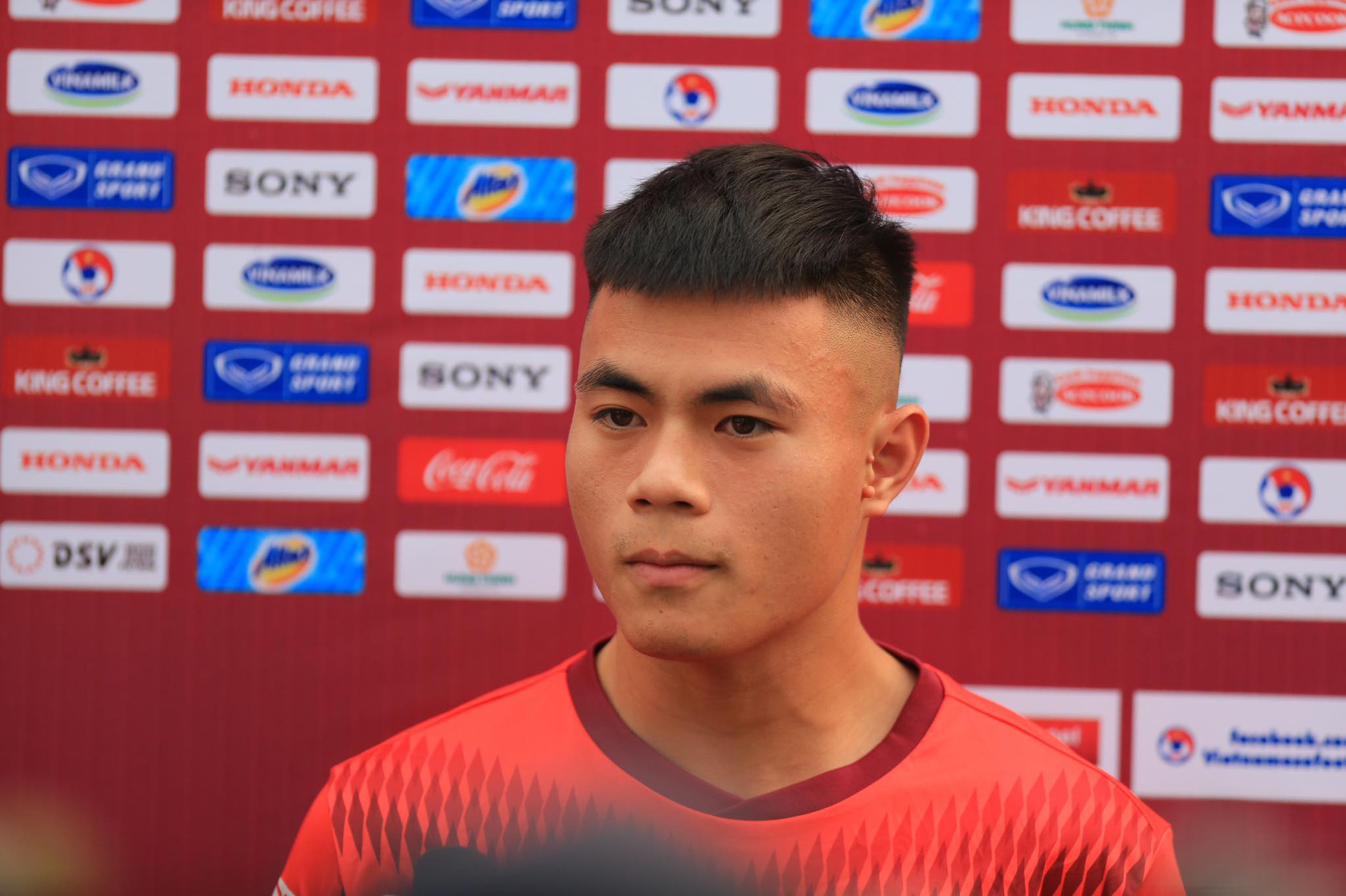
- Lý Công Hoàng Anh in 2021

Personal information
- Full name: Lý Công Hoàng Anh
- Date of birth: 1 September 1999 (age 27)
- Place of birth: Hòa Bình, Vietnam
- Height: 1.68 m (5 ft 6 in)
- Position: Central midfielder

Team information
- Current team: Thép Xanh Nam Định
- Number: 88

Youth career
- 2012–2017: Hà Nội

Senior career*
Years	Team	Apps	(Gls)
2018–2022	Hồng Lĩnh Hà Tĩnh	24	(3)
2022–2023	Topenland Bình Định	36	(2)
2023–	Thép Xanh Nam Định	71	(7)

International career^{‡}
2019–2021	Vietnam U21	1	(0)
2020–2022	Vietnam U23	14	(0)
2021	Vietnam	1	(0)
Medal record
Men's football
Representing Vietnam
SEA Games
Gold medal – first place	Hanoi 2021	Team
- * Club domestic league appearances and goals as of 7 June 2026 ‡ National team caps and goals as of 6 May 2022

Lý Công Hoàng Anh (born 1 September 1999) is a Vietnamese professional footballer who plays as a central midfielder for V.League 1 club Thép Xanh Nam Định .

== Career statistics ==
=== International ===
As of 6 May 2022

National team	Year	Apps	Goals
Vietnam
Vietnam	2022	2	1
Total		2	1

== Honours ==
Hồng Lĩnh Hà Tĩnh

- V.League 2: 2019

Thép Xanh Nam Định

- V.League 1: 2023–24, 2024–25
- Vietnamese Super Cup: 2024

Vietnam U23

- SEA Games gold medal: 2021
