= Nguyễn Quang Vinh =

Vietnamese footballer

Personal information
- Full name: Nguyễn Quang Vinh
- Date of birth: 27 January 2005 (age 21)
- Place of birth: Nghi Lộc, Nghệ An, Vietnam
- Height: 1.74 m (5 ft 9 in)
- Position: Midfielder

Team information
- Current team: Sông Lam Nghệ An
- Number: 16

Youth career
- 2016–2023: Sông Lam Nghệ An

Senior career*
| Years | Team | Apps | (Gls) |
| 2023– | Sông Lam Nghệ An | 75 | (7) |

International career^{‡}
| 2019–2020 | Vietnam U16 | 6 | (0) |
| 2024–2025 | Vietnam U20 | 2 | (0) |
| 2025– | Vietnam U23 | 7 | (0) |
| 2026– | Vietnam | 1 | (0) |
- * Club domestic league appearances and goals as of 20 November 2026 ‡ National team caps and goals as of 17 November 2026

Nguyễn Quang Vinh (born 27 January 2005) is a Vietnamese professional footballer who plays as a midfielder for V.League 1 club Sông Lam Nghệ An and the Vietnam national team.

== Early career ==
Born in Nghệ An, Quang Vinh started playing football from a young age for his school team. After displaying good performances in a U11 district tournament in 2016, he was recruited to the Sông Lam Nghệ An football academy. With his good ability to play well with both feet, he was trained to become a playmaker. He captained Sông Lam Nghệ An youth teams from U13 to U17. He was part of the Sông Lam Nghệ An that finished as runners-up in the 2023 Vietnamese National U-19 Championship and the 2023 Vietnamese National U-21 Championship.

== Club career ==
He was promoted to Sông Lam Nghệ An's first team for the 2023–24 V.League 1 season. On 22 October 2022, he made his professional debut in Sông Lam Nghệ An's 1–1 home draw against Viettel, coming in as a substitute for Trần Mạnh Quỳnh in the 90th minute. He scored his first professional goal on 26 November 2023 against Đồng Tháp in his team's 6–2 Vietnamese Cup win. On 18 May 2024, he scored the winning goal in Sông Lam Nghệ An's 2–1 victory against Khánh Hòa, thus secure his team from the direct relegation position.

== International career ==
With Vietnam U15, Quang Vinh took part squad for the 2019 AFF U-15 Championship. He made four appearances during the tournament as Vietnam finished in fourth place.

In 2023, Quang Vinh was named in the preliminary squad for the 2023 AFC U-20 Championship and 2023 AFF U-23 Championship both didn't feature in the final squad for both tournaments.

In November 2026, Quang Vinh received his first call-up to the Vietnam national team, being named in the squad for the friendly tournament Casper Cup.

== Career statistics ==
As of match played 20 November 2026

Appearances and goals by club, season and competition
| Club | Season | League | | | Cup | | Continental | | Other | | Total | |
| Club | Season | Division | Apps | Goals | Apps | Goals | Apps | Goals | Apps | Goals | Apps | Goals |
|---|---|---|---|---|---|---|---|---|---|---|---|---|
| Sông Lam Nghệ An | 2023–24 | V.League 1 | 23 | 2 | 1 | 1 | — | | — | | 24 | 3 |
| Sông Lam Nghệ An | 2024–25 | V.League 1 | 24 | 2 | 4 | 0 | — | | — | | 28 | 2 |
| Sông Lam Nghệ An | 2025–26 | V.League 1 | 20 | 0 | 1 | 0 | — | | — | | 21 | 0 |
| Sông Lam Nghệ An | 2026–27 | V.League 1 | 8 | 3 | 1 | 0 | — | | — | | 9 | 3 |
| Career total | | | 75 | 7 | 7 | 1 | 0 | 0 | 0 | 0 | 82 | 8 |
