= Nguyễn Anh Tuấn =

Vietnamese footballer

Personal information
- Full name: Nguyễn Anh Tuấn
- Date of birth: March 25, 1994 (age 32)
- Place of birth: Ho Chi Minh City, Vietnam
- Height: 1.67 m (5 ft 6 in)
- Position: Centre back

Senior career*
Years	Team	Apps	(Gls)
2014–2015	Hải Phòng	12	(0)
2016–2017	Hồ Chí Minh City	17	(0)
2018–2023	Đồng Nai	67	(9)

International career
2015–2016	Vietnam	1	(0)
- * Club domestic league appearances and goals

Nguyễn Anh Tuấn (born 25 March 1994) is a Vietnamese footballer who plays for Đồng Nai as a centre-back. He was called up to the Vietnam national football team in 2015.
