= Vietnam national under-21 football team =

Vietnam
- Nickname(s): Những chiến binh Sao Vàng (Golden Star Warriors)
- Association: Vietnam Football Federation (VFF)
- Confederation: AFC (Asia)
- Sub-confederation: AFF (Southeast Asia)
- Head coach: Dương Hồng Sơn
- Captain: Đặng Văn Tới
- Home stadium: Mỹ Đình National Stadium; Thống Nhất Stadium
- FIFA code: VIE
First colours	Second colours

The Vietnam national under-21 football team represents Vietnam at international youth association football competitions for age under-21. It is controlled by the Vietnam Football Federation.

== International records ==
=== Nations Cup Malaysia 2016 ===
2016 Nations Cup								Coach
Year	Round	GP	W	D	L	GF	GA	Coach
(Malaysia) 2016	Third Place	2	0	1	1	2	4	(Vietnam) Hoàng Anh Tuấn
Total	Best: Third Place	2	0	1	1	2	4	

AFC U-19 Championship History
Year	Round	Score			Result
2016	Semi-finals	Vietnam	0 – 2	Thailand	Loss
2016	Third place	Vietnam	2–2 aet 5–4 pen	Singapore	Won

=== International U-21 Thanh Niên Newspaper Cup ===
International U-21 Thanh Niên Newspaper Cup								Coach
Year	Round	GP	W	D	L	GF	GA	Coach
(Vietnam) 2007 Nha Trang	Champions	3	3	0	0	6	0	
(Vietnam) 2008 Huế	Third place	4	2	0	2	6	8	
(Vietnam) 2009 Bình Dương	Runner-up	4	2	0	2	10	9	
(Vietnam) 2010 Ho Chi Minh City	Third place	4	3	0	1	10	4	
(Vietnam) 2011 Gia Lai	Champions	4	3	1	0	7	3	
(Vietnam) 2012 Gia Lai	Runner-up	4	3	0	1	11	2	(Vietnam) Đinh Văn Dũng
(Vietnam) 2013 Phan Rang	Champions	4	3	0	1	8	5	
(Vietnam) 2014 Cần Thơ	Third place	4	2	2	0	6	2	
(Vietnam) 2015 Ho Chi Minh City	4th Place	4	2	2	0	9	6	(Vietnam) Phạm Minh Đức
(Vietnam) 2016 Ho Chi Minh City	4th Place	4	0	2	2	1	3	(Vietnam) Phạm Minh Đức
(Vietnam) 2017 Cần Thơ	Runner-up	5	2	1	2	8	6	(Vietnam) Trần Minh Chiến
Total	3 title	44	25	8	11	82	48	

== Players ==
=== Current squad ===
No.	Pos.	Player	Date of birth (age)	Club
	GK	Nguyễn Văn Toản	26 November 1999 (aged 21)	(Vietnam Football Federation) Hải Phòng
	GK	Dương Tùng Lâm	25 December 1999 (aged 21)	(Vietnam Football Federation) Hồng Lĩnh Hà Tĩnh
	GK	Y Êli Niê	8 January 2001 (aged 20)	(Vietnam Football Federation) Đắk Lắk
	DF	Phùng Viết Trường	8 January 1999 (aged 22)	(Vietnam Football Federation) Hà Nội
	DF	Nguyễn Vũ Tính	10 February 1999 (aged 21)	(Vietnam Football Federation) Sài Gòn
	DF	Đặng Văn Tới	20 January 1999 (aged 21)	(Vietnam Football Federation) Hà Nội
	DF	Bùi Hoàng Việt Anh	1 January 1999 (aged 22)	(Vietnam Football Federation) Hà Nội
	DF	Trần Văn Đạt	6 January 2001 (aged 20)	(Vietnam Football Federation) Than Quảng Ninh
	DF	Nguyễn Xuân Kiên	13 February 2000 (aged 20)	(Vietnam Football Federation) Viettel
	MF	Nguyễn Anh Tuấn	24 January 2000 (aged 20)	(Vietnam Football Federation) Hồ Chí Minh City
	MF	Trần Văn Bửu	8 January 1999 (aged 22)	(Vietnam Football Federation) Viettel
	MF	Trần Đức Nam	12 January 1999 (aged 21)	(Vietnam Football Federation) Hồng Lĩnh Hà Tĩnh
	MF	Trần Văn Công	23 August 2001 (aged 19)	(Vietnam Football Federation) Hà Nội
	MF	Nguyễn Hữu Thắng	19 May 2000 (aged 20)	(Vietnam Football Federation) Viettel
	MF	Thái Khắc Huy Hoàng	24 July 1999 (aged 21)	(Vietnam Football Federation) Sông Lam Nghệ An
	MF	Mạch Ngọc Hà	10 September 2001 (aged 18)	(Vietnam Football Federation) Hà Nội
	MF	Trần Bảo Toàn	14 July 2001 (aged 18)	(Vietnam Football Federation) Hoàng Anh Gia Lai
	FW	Nguyễn Hữu Tuấn	29 March 1999 (aged 21)	(Vietnam Football Federation) Hồ Chí Minh City
	FW	Lê Xuân Tú	6 September 1999 (aged 21)	(Vietnam Football Federation) Hồng Lĩnh Hà Tĩnh
	FW	Trần Danh Trung	3 October 2000 (aged 20)	(Vietnam Football Federation) Viettel
	FW	Nhâm Mạnh Dũng	12 April 2000 (aged 20)	(Vietnam Football Federation) Viettel
