= Dương Thanh Hào =

Vietnamese footballer (born 1991)

Personal information
- Full name: Dương Thanh Hào
- Date of birth: June 23, 1991 (age 35)
- Place of birth: Quy Nhơn, Bình Định, Vietnam
- Height: 1.78 m (5 ft 10 in)
- Position: Centre-back

Team information
- Current team: Thép Xanh Nam Định
- Number: 3

Youth career
- 2004–2010: Cà Mau

Senior career*
Years	Team	Apps	(Gls)
2011–2014	Đồng Tháp	35	(0)
2015–2016	Hà Nội	10	(0)
2016–2020	Than Quảng Ninh	85	(0)
2021–2022	Topeland Bình Định	21	(0)
2023–	Thép Xanh Nam Định	71	(2)

International career^{‡}
2011–2013	Vietnam U23	5	(0)
2016–2017	Vietnam	15	(0)
- * Club domestic league appearances and goals as of 7 June 2026 ‡ National team caps and goals as of 20 May 2017

Dương Thanh Hào (born 23 June 1991) is a Vietnamese professional footballer who plays as a centre-back for V.League 1 club Thép Xanh Nam Định.

== Club career ==
=== Than Quang Ninh ===
After the 2016 season, Thanh Hào signed a 3-year deal with Than Quang Ninh.

== Honours ==
Hà Nội

- V.League 1: 2016

Thép Xanh Nam Định

- V.League 1: 2023–24, 2024–25
- Vietnamese Super Cup: 2024
