= Y Êli Niê =

Vietnamese footballer (born 2001)

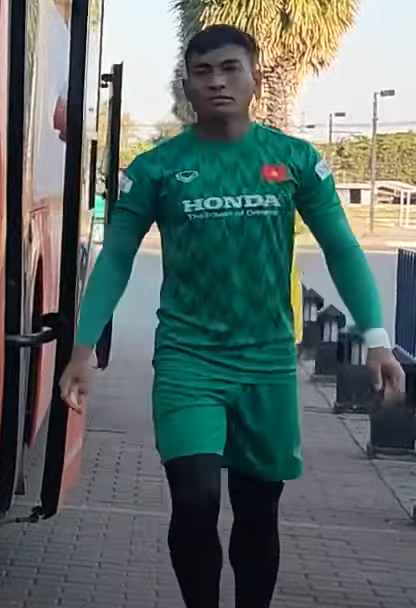
- Y Êli Niê in 2020

Personal information
- Full name: Y Êli Niê
- Date of birth: 8 January 2001 (age 25)
- Place of birth: Cư M'gar, Đắk Lắk, Vietnam
- Height: 1.80 m (5 ft 11 in)
- Position: Goalkeeper

Team information
- Current team: Thanh Hóa
- Number: 30

Youth career
- 2015–2016: Đắk Lắk
- 2016: JMG Academy

Senior career*
| Years | Team | Apps | (Gls) |
| 2017–2023 | Đắk Lắk | 43 | (0) |
| 2023– | Thanh Hóa | 26 | (0) |

International career^{‡}
| 2017–2019 | Vietnam U18 | 10 | (0) |
| 2017–2019 | Vietnam U19 | 7 | (0) |
| 2022–2024 | Vietnam U23 | 1 | (0) |
- * Club domestic league appearances and goals as of 7 June 2026 ‡ National team caps and goals as of 4 March 2022

Y Êli Niê (born 8 January 2001) is a Vietnamese professional footballer who plays as a goalkeeper for V.League 1 club Thanh Hóa .

== Early life ==
Y Êli Niê was born as the fifth child of seven. He is part of the Rade ethnic group, who assign surnames matrilineally (contrary to Vietnamese convention). Despite sharing a surname, he is not related to H'Hen Niê.

He started playing football aged 10. He won the National U11 Championship with the Dak Lak U11 team.

== Club career ==
On 24 February 2026, during Thanh Hóa's V.League 1 match against Công An Hà Nội, Y Êli Niê was substituted onto the field as a striker due to a lack of available outfield players in the Thanh Hóa squad.

== Honours ==
Thanh Hóa

- Vietnamese Cup: 2023–24

Công An Hà Nội

- Vietnamese Super Cup: 2026

Vietnam U23

- AFF U-23 Championship: 2022
