= A Mít =

Vietnamese footballer (born 1997)

Personal information
- Full name: A Mít
- Date of birth: 27 July 1997 (age 29)
- Place of birth: Kon Tum, Vietnam
- Height: 1.67 m (5 ft 6 in)
- Position: Winger

Team information
- Current team: Thép Xanh Nam Định
- Number: 6

Youth career
- 2009–2010: Hoàng Anh Gia Lai
- 2013–2016: SHB Đà Nẵng

Senior career*
Years	Team	Apps	(Gls)
2016–2022	SHB Đà Nẵng	52	(3)
2022–2025	Thanh Hóa	98	(6)
2025–	Thép Xanh Nam Định	16	(0)
- * Club domestic league appearances and goals as of 7 June 2026

A Mít (born 27 July 1997) is a Vietnamese professional footballer who plays as a winger for V.League 1 club Thép Xanh Nam Định.

== Early life and career ==
A Mít was born to a family of Bahnar melon farmers in Kon Tum. He has seven siblings. At the age of 12, A Mít traveled to Pleiku, Gia Lai to join the HAGL – Arsenal JMG Academy. However, he failed to impress due to his small stature and frequent injuries. A few years later, SHB Đà Nẵng took notice of A Mít and invited him to the club's academy. In 2016, A Mít made his league debut and stayed in Đà Nẵng until he left for Thanh Hóa in 2022.

== Honours ==
Đông Á Thanh Hóa

- Vietnamese National Cup: 2023, 2023–24
- Vietnamese Super Cup: 2023
