= Trần Nguyên Mạnh =

Vietnamese footballer

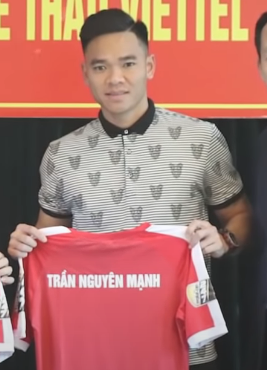
- Nguyên Mạnh in 2019

Personal information
- Full name: Trần Nguyên Mạnh
- Date of birth: 20 December 1991 (age 34)
- Place of birth: Nghĩa Đàn, Nghệ An, Vietnam
- Height: 1.78 m (5 ft 10 in)
- Position: Goalkeeper

Team information
- Current team: Thép Xanh Nam Định
- Number: 26

Youth career
- 2003–2011: Sông Lam Nghệ An

Senior career*
Years	Team	Apps	(Gls)
2012–2020	Sông Lam Nghệ An	133	(0)
2020–2022	Viettel	51	(0)
2023–	Thép Xanh Nam Định	92	(0)

International career^{‡}
2014–2022	Vietnam	33	(0)
Medal record
Men's football
Representing Vietnam
AFF Championship
Runner-up	2022 ASEAN	Team
- * Club domestic league appearances and goals as of 7 June 2026 ‡ National team caps and goals as of 1 February 2022

Trần Nguyên Mạnh (born 20 December 1991) is a Vietnamese professional footballer who plays as a goalkeeper for V.League 1 club Thép Xanh Nam Định, which he captain.

== International career ==
In the second leg of the semifinals of the 2016 AFF Championship against Indonesia Nguyên Mạnh caused controversy when he kicked out at an Indonesian player who had bundled him over during a corner kick. Referee Fu Ming showed Nguyên Mạnh a straight red card and Vietnam were forced to put Quế Ngọc Hải in goal as they had already made all three substitutions. A month later Nguyên Mạnh was fined US$1,000 by the AFC and would be barred from playing in any of the 2019 AFC qualifying matches.

== Personal life ==
In March 2016, Nguyên Mạnh married Phương Chi in a private ceremony. The two had been in a relationship for six years up to that point, before Nguyên Mạnh had even started playing for Sông Lam Nghệ An.

== Career statistics ==
=== International ===
As of 27 December 2022

Vietnam
Year	Apps	Goals
2014	7	0
2015	4	0
2016	13	0
2017	0	0
2018	0	0
2019	0	0
2021	5	0
2022	4	0
Total	33	0

== Honours ==
Sông Lam Nghệ An

- V.League 1: 2011
- Vietnamese Cup: 2017

Viettel

- V.League 1: 2020

Thép Xanh Nam Định

- V.League 1: 2023–24, 2024–25
- Vietnamese Super Cup: 2024

Vietnam

- AYA Bank Cup: 2016
- VFF Cup: 2022
- AFF Championship runners-up: 2022

Individual

- V.League 1 Team of the Season: 2019, 2020, 2022, 2023
