= Trần Liêm Điều =

Vietnamese footballer

Personal information
- Full name: Trần Liêm Điều
- Date of birth: 19 February 2001 (age 25)
- Place of birth: Xuân Trường, Nam Định, Vietnam
- Height: 1.85 m (6 ft 1 in)
- Position: Goalkeeper

Team information
- Current team: Thep Xanh Nam Dinh
- Number: 82

Youth career
- 2012–2018: Nam Định

Senior career*
Years	Team	Apps	(Gls)
2019–	Thep Xanh Nam Dinh	12	(0)

International career^{‡}
2022	Vietnam U23	1	(0)
Medal record
Men's football
Representing Vietnam
AFF U-23 Championship
Winner	Cambodia 2022	Team
- * Club domestic league appearances and goals as of 7 June 2026 ‡ National team caps and goals as of 22 March 2022

Trần Liêm Điều (born 19 February 2001) is a Vietnamese professional footballer who plays as a goalkeeper for V.League 1 club Nam Định .

== International career ==
=== 2022 AFF U-23 Championship ===
At the 2022 AFF U-23 Championship, before the semi-final match against the Timor-Leste, Vietnam had only 9 players eligible to compete, because the rest of the players had all tested positive for COVID-19. Tran Liem Dieu is one of four players called up for the Vietnam U23 team. On February 24, 2022, he was present in Cambodia to join the team just a few hours before the semi-finals of the tournament. In the injury time of the first extra time, he was substituted by coach Dinh The Nam for Nguyen Trung Thanh, this is the first time Liem Dieu has played in the Vietnam U23 in an official match. Dieu played 21 minutes in the role of a striker, helping Vietnam win against Timor-Leste to reach the final of the 2022 AFF U-23 Championship.

== Honours ==
Thép Xanh Nam Định

- V.League 1: 2023–24, 2024–25
- Vietnamese Super Cup: 2024

Vietnam U23

- AFF U-23 Championship: 2022
