= Trần Văn Đạt =

Vietnamese footballer (born 2000)

Personal information
- Birth name: Trần Văn Đạt
- Date of birth: 26 December 2000 (age 25)
- Place of birth: Quỳnh Lưu, Nghệ An, Vietnam
- Height: 1.75 m (5 ft 9 in)
- Positions: Attacking midfielder; forward

Team information
- Current team: Thép Xanh Nam Định
- Number: 19

Youth career
- 2014–2020: Hà Nội

Senior career*
Years	Team	Apps	(Gls)
2018–2020	→ Phú Thọ (loan)		
2020–2023	Hà Nội	1	(0)
2021–2022	→ Công An Nhân Dân (loan)	8	(2)
2023–	Thép Xanh Nam Định	53	(5)

International career^{‡}
2019–2020	Vietnam U19	1	(0)
2021–2022	Vietnam U23	7	(2)
- * Club domestic league appearances and goals as of 7 June 2026 ‡ National team caps and goals as of 1 April 2022

Trần Văn Đạt (born 26 December 2000) is a Vietnamese professional footballer who plays as an attacking midfielder for V.League 1 side Thép Xanh Nam Định.

== Club career ==
In 2014, Văn Đạt joined the youth team of Hà Nội through the club's academy network in his hometown in Nghệ An.

In 2020, he was loaned to Phú Thọ in the Vietnamese Second Division. Văn Đạt started in most of the matches and play an important role to obtain his team a promotion to the 2021 V.League 2.

In search for game time, he was once again loaned out in 2021, joining V.League 2 newly promoted side Công An Nhân Dân, who is coached by Dương Hồng Sơn, who previously worked with Văn Đạt at Phú Thọ. Văn Đạt made only 2 league appearances during the 2021 season and was sent back to Hà Nội, where he made his debut on 7 April 2022 in a 4–0 victory in Vietnamese Cup against his former team Công An Nhân Dân. Shortly after, in August during the same year, Văn Đạt came back to Công An Nhân Dân on another loan deal. He appeared 6 out of 8 remaining games and ended up winning the league title, gaining the team a promotion to the 2023 V.League 1.

== International career ==
In 2021, Văn Đạt was named in Vietnam national team's 30-men squad for the 2020 AFF Championship but didn't make any appearance during the tournament.

In 2022, Văn Đạt was named in Vietnam U23's preliminary squad for the 2021 SEA Games and the 2022 AFC U-23 Asian Cup but wasn't included in the squad for both tournaments.

== Honours ==
Công An Nhân Dân

- V.League 2: 2022

Thép Xanh Nam Định

- V.League 1: 2023–24, 2024–25
- Vietnamese Super Cup: 2024

Individual

- Vietnamese National U-21 Championship best player: 2019
