= Trần Minh Toàn =

Vietnamese footballer (born 1996)

Personal information
- Full name: Trần Minh Toàn
- Date of birth: 21 January 1996 (age 30)
- Place of birth: Trảng Bàng, Tây Ninh, Vietnam
- Height: 1.86 m (6 ft 1 in)
- Position: Goalkeeper

Team information
- Current team: Becamex Hồ Chí Minh City
- Number: 25

Youth career
- 2013–2017: Tây Ninh

Senior career*
Years	Team	Apps	(Gls)
2018–2020	Tây Ninh	21	(0)
2021–2023	Sài Gòn	0	(0)
2023–	Becamex Hồ Chí Minh City	94	(0)
- * Club domestic league appearances and goals as of 7 June 2026

Trần Minh Toàn (born 21 January 1996) is a Vietnamese professional footballer who plays as a goalkeeper for V.League 1 club Becamex Hồ Chí Minh City.

== Club career ==
Trần Minh Toàn began his career with Tây Ninh.

On 8 December 2020, V.League 1 club Sài Gòn announced on their Facebook account that Toàn has transferred to the club.

Before the 2023 season, Toàn became a new player of Becamex Bình Dương. He made his V.League 1 debut on 4 February as they began the season with a 2–2 draw at Hải Phòng.

== International career ==
Trần Minh Toàn has represented Vietnam internationally at youth level. He was a member of Vietnam national under-19 football team for 2014 AFC U-19 Championship.

In June 2023, Toàn was called up to the Vietnam national team squad for the first time by new manager Philippe Troussier.
