= Lucas Alves (footballer, born 1992) =

Brazilian footballer

Personal information
- Full name: Lucas Alves de Araújo
- Date of birth: 22 July 1992 (age 34)
- Place of birth: Osasco, Brazil
- Height: 1.93 m (6 ft 4 in)
- Position: Centre-back

Team information
- Current team: The Cong-Viettel
- Number: 15

Youth career
- –2011: Corinthians

Senior career*
Years	Team	Apps	(Gls)
2011–2018	Corinthians	0	(0)
2011	→ Flamengo-SP (loan)	0	(0)
2012	→ Olaria (loan)	0	(0)
2012	→ Ipatinga (loan)	1	(0)
2013	→ Atlético Goianiense (loan)	2	(0)
2014–2015	Atlético Paranaense	0	(0)
2015	VfR Aalen	0	(0)
2015–2016	Biel-Bienne	25	(1)
2016–2017	Le Mont	12	(0)
2017–2021	Luzern	98	(5)
2021–2022	Al-Tai	18	(1)
2022	Lamia	10	(1)
2022–2023	Al-Nasr	12	(0)
2023	Portimonense	7	(0)
2023–2024	Dinamo București	16	(0)
2024–2026	Thep Xanh Nam Dinh	39	(7)
2026–	The Cong-Viettel	3	(0)
- * Club domestic league appearances and goals as of 19 October 2026

Lucas Alves de Araújo (born 22 July 1992), known as Lucas Alves or Lucão, is a Brazilian professional footballer who plays as a centre-back for V.League 1 club The Cong-Viettel.

== Club career ==
On 15 February 2022, Alves signed with Lamia in Greece.

On 4 August 2023, he joined Romanian club Dinamo București.

On 10 August 2026, Alves was transferred to V.League 1 side The Cong–Viettel from Thep Xanh Nam Dinh.

== Honours ==
Luzern

- Swiss Cup: 2020–21

Thep Xanh Nam Dinh

- V.League 1: 2023–24, 2024–25
- Vietnamese Super Cup: 2024
