= Kevin Pham Ba =

French footballer

Personal information
- Birth name: Kévin Pham-Ba
- Date of birth: 3 February 1994 (age 32)
- Place of birth: Paris, France
- Height: 1.81 m (5 ft 11 1/2 in)
- Position: Right-back

Team information
- Current team: Cong An Hanoi
- Number: 93

Youth career
- –2011: Sochaux

Senior career*
Years	Team	Apps	(Gls)
2011–2014	Sochaux B	32	(0)
2014–2015	Le Pontet	28	(0)
2015–2016	Troyes B	18	(1)
2016–2017	Le Pontet	13	(2)
2017–2018	Marignane Gignac	16	(0)
2018–2020	Martigues	27	(1)
2020–2021	Schiltigheim	9	(0)
2021–2023	Versailles	40	(1)
2023	Fréjus Saint-Raphaël	6	(1)
2023–2024	Istres	15	(1)
2024–2025	Marignane GCB	10	(0)
2025–	Cong An Hanoi	2	(0)
2025–2026	→ Thep Xanh Nam Dinh (loan)	27	(4)
- * Club domestic league appearances and goals as of 10 September 2026

Kévin Pham-Ba (born 3 February 1994) is a French professional footballer who plays as a right-back for V.League 1 club Cong An Hanoi.

== Early life ==
Kevin was born in Paris, France. He is of Vietnamese descent through his grandfather.

== Club career ==
Pham Ba trained at FC Bourget puis au Fc Sochaux He first played as a right winger, then was repositioned to right-back and center back.

He has played in French 3rd, 4th and 5th divisions for 10 years, having played for many clubs such as Sochaux II, Troyes II, Marignane Gicnac, Martigues and Versailles.

In the 2021–22 season, Pham Ba reached the semi-finals of the Coupe de France with Versailles, before his team was defeated by Ligue 1 side Nice.

In March 2025, Pham Ba came to Vietnam, the country of his origins and joined Cong An Hanoi in the V.League 1, signing his first professional contract. Immediately after he moved, he joined league fellow Thep Xanh Nam Dinh and won the 2024–25 V.League 1 with the team. On 16 July 2025, Pham Ba extended his loan to Nam Dinh for one more season.

== Honours ==
Thep Xanh Nam Dinh

- V.League 1: 2024–25

Cong An Hanoi

- Vietnamese Super Cup: 2026
