= Trần Ngọc Sơn (footballer, born 2003) =

Vietnamese footballer (born 2003)

Personal information
- Full name: Trần Ngọc Sơn
- Date of birth: 27 January 2003 (age 23)
- Place of birth: Giao Thủy, Nam Định, Vietnam
- Height: 1.75 m (5 ft 9 in)
- Position: Winger

Team information
- Current team: Thép Xanh Nam Định
- Number: 27

Youth career
- 2015–2021: Nam Định

Senior career*
Years	Team	Apps	(Gls)
2021–	Thép Xanh Nam Định	59	(9)
2024–2025	→ PVF-CAND (loan)	7	(1)

International career^{‡}
2024	Vietnam U23	2	(0)
2026–	Vietnam	2	(0)
- * Club domestic league appearances and goals as of 21 November 2026 ‡ National team caps and goals as of 17 November 2026

Trần Ngọc Sơn (born 27 January 2003) is a Vietnamese professional footballer who plays as a winger for V.League 1 club Thép Xanh Nam Định and the Vietnam national team.

== Club career ==
Born in Nam Định, Ngọc Sơn was a youth product of his local team Nam Định FC. In 2021, he was promoted to Nam Định's first team but only made his debut an year later. On 7 August 2022, he scored his first V.League 1 goal in his team's 2–1 victory against Hồ Chí Minh City.

In the 2023 season, Ngọc Sơn appeared in 13 matches and scored 3 goals. Therefore, he was nominated for the "Best young player of the season" award but lost to Nguyễn Thái Sơn.

In August 2024, due to lack of game time at Nam Định, Ngọc Sơn joined V.League 2 side PVF-CAND on a one-year loan deal.

== International career ==
In August 2023, Ngọc Sơn was named Vietnam U23's preliminary squad for the 2023 AFF U-23 Championship but was not included in the final squad.

In March 2024, Ngọc Sơn received his first call up to the Vietnam national team for the World Cup qualifiers games against Indonesia.

In November 2026, two years after his last call up, Ngọc Sơn was selected to the national team squad for the friendly tournament Casper Cup.

== Career statistics ==
As of match played 21 November 2026

Appearances and goals by club, season and competition
Club	Season	League			Cup		Continental		Other		Total	
Club	Season	Division	Apps	Goals	Apps	Goals	Apps	Goals	Apps	Goals	Apps	Goals
Thép Xanh Nam Định	2021	V.League 1	0	0	0	0	—		—		0	0
Thép Xanh Nam Định	2022	V.League 1	11	1	1	0	—		—		12	1
Thép Xanh Nam Định	2023	V.League 1	14	3	1	0	—		—		15	3
Thép Xanh Nam Định	2023–24	V.League 1	14	1	3	0	—		—		17	1
Thép Xanh Nam Định	2025–26	V.League 1	12	1	3	0	0	0	5 (Note: One appearance in Vietnamese Super Cup, four appearances and one goal in ASEAN Club Championship)	1	20	2
Thép Xanh Nam Định	2026–27	V.League 1	8	3	0	0	—		—		8	3
Thép Xanh Nam Định	Total		59	9	8	0	0	0	5	1	72	10
PVF-CAND	2024–25	V.League 2	7	1	1	0	—		—		8	1
Total career			66	10	9	0	0	0	5	1	80	11

== Honours ==
Thép Xanh Nam Định

- V.League 1: 2023–24
- Vietnamese Super Cup: 2024
