= Helerson =

Brazilian footballer (born 1997)

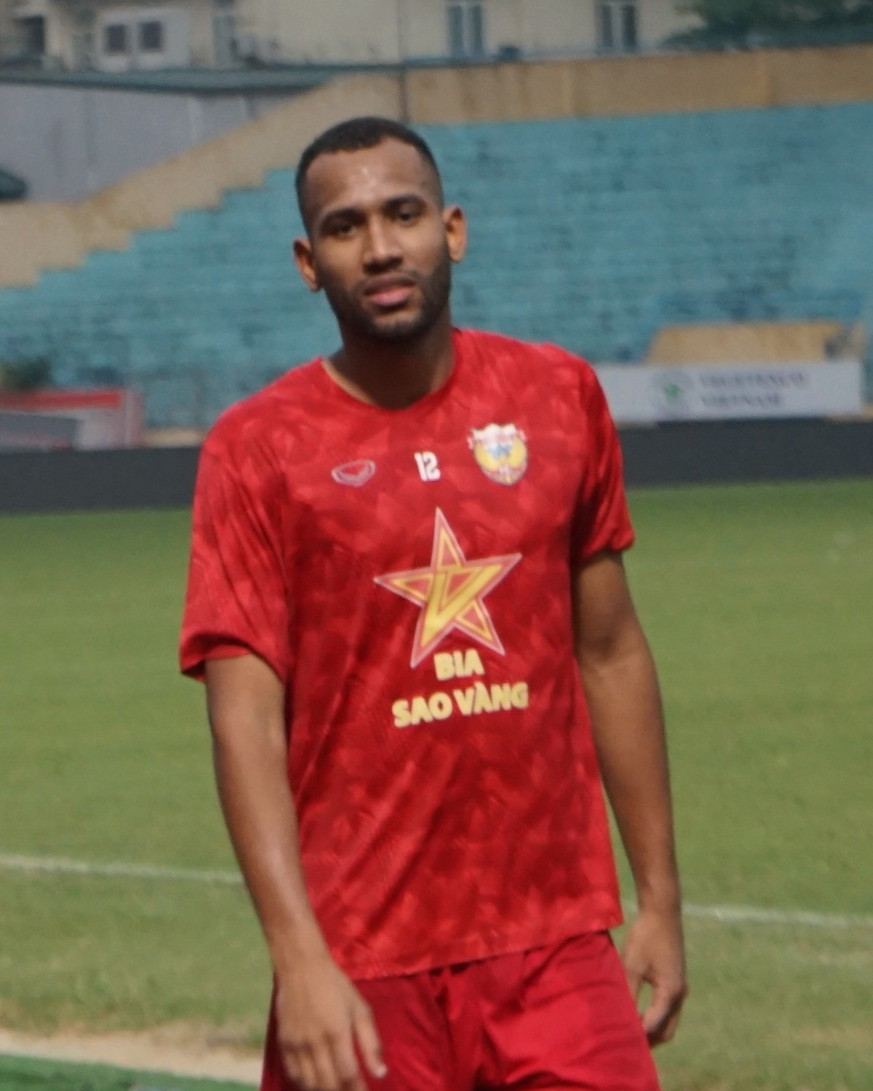
- Helerson in 2026

Personal information
- Full name: Helerson Mateus do Nascimento
- Date of birth: 28 October 1997 (age 29)
- Place of birth: Belford Roxo, Brazil
- Height: 1.90 m (6 ft 3 in)
- Position: Centre-back

Team information
- Current team: Hong Linh Ha Tinh
- Number: 12

Youth career
- –2018: Botafogo

Senior career*
Years	Team	Apps	(Gls)
2018–2021	Botafogo	4	(0)
2019–2020	→ Estoril (loan)	1	(0)
2021	Joinville	21	(1)
2022	Brasil de Pelotas	23	(2)
2023	Confiança	0	(0)
2023	Mesaimeer	9	(0)
2024	Tacuary	25	(1)
2024–	Hong Linh Ha Tinh	48	(5)
- * Club domestic league appearances and goals as of 7 June 2026

Helerson Mateus do Nascimento (born 28 October 1997), commonly known as Helerson, is a Brazilian professional footballer who plays as a centre-back for V.League 1 club Hong Linh Ha Tinh.

== Career ==
Helerson was a product of the Botafogo youth academy. He made his senior debut with Botafogo's first team in 2019. In July 2017, he joined Portuguese side Estoril on a one-year loan deal.

In August 2024, Helerson moved to Vietnamese club Hong Linh Ha Tinh, signing a one-year contract.

== Career statistics ==
=== Club ===
As of 18 August 2024.

Appearances and goals by club, season and competition
Club	Season	League			State league		Cup		Continental		Other		Total	
Club	Season	Division	Apps	Goals	Apps	Goals	Apps	Goals	Apps	Goals	Apps	Goals	Apps	Goals
Botafogo	2018	Série A	1	0	—		0	0	—		—		1	0
Botafogo	2019	Série A	0	0	2 (Note: Appearances in the Campeonato Carioca)	0	0	0	1 (Note: Appearances in the Copa Sudamericana)	0	—		3	0
Botafogo	2020	Série A	0	0	—		—		—		—		0	0
Botafogo	Total		1	0	2	0	0	0	1	0	—		4	0
Estoril (loan)	2019–20	LigaPro	1	0	—		0	0	—		0	0	1	0
Joinville	2021	Série D	15	0	6 (Note: Appearances in the Campeonato Catarinense)	1	1	0	—		—		22	1
Brasil de Pelotas	2022	Série C	10	1	13 (Note: Appearances in the Campeonato Gaúcho)	1	1	0	—		—		24	1
Confiança	2023	Série C	—		—		—		—		0	0	0	0
Mesaimeer	2022–23	Qatari Second Division	9	0	—		1	0	—		0	0	10	0
Tacuary	2024	Paraguayan Primera División	25	1	—		—		—		—		25	1
Career total			61	2	21	2	3	0	1	0	0	0	86	4
