= Rômulo (footballer, born 1996) =

Brazilian footballer

Personal information
- Full name: Rômulo da Silva Machado
- Date of birth: 10 January 1996 (age 30)
- Place of birth: Cascavel, Brazil
- Height: 1.82 m (6 ft 0 in)
- Position: Defensive midfielder

Team information
- Current team: Thep Xanh Nam Dinh
- Number: 72

Senior career*
Years	Team	Apps	(Gls)
2017–2020	Londrina	50	(1)
2018	→ Atlético Goianiense (loan)	32	(1)
2019–2020	→ Portimonense (loan)	16	(1)
2020–2024	Portimonense	0	(0)
2021	→ Brasil de Pelotas (loan)	35	(1)
2022–2023	→ Criciúma (loan)	68	(6)
2024	CRB	33	(2)
2025–	Thep Xanh Nam Dinh	28	(2)
- * Club domestic league appearances and goals as of 7 June 2026

Rômulo da Silva Machado (born 10 January 1996) is a Brazilian professional footballer who plays as a defensive midfielder for V.League 1 club Thep Xanh Nam Dinh.

== Career ==
Rômulo made his professional debut with Londrina in a 3–0 Campeonato Brasileiro Série B loss to Internacional on 13 May 2017. On 14 June 2019, Rômulo joined Portimonense on loan in the Primeira Liga.

On 10 January 2024, after having spent the previous season on loan at Criciúma, Rômulo joined Série B club CRB.

== Honours ==
Criciúma

- Campeonato Catarinense: 2023
- Campeonato Catarinense Série B: 2022

CRB

- Campeonato Alagoano: 2024

Thép Xanh Nam Định

- V.League 1: 2024–25
