= Giáp Tuấn Dương =

Vietnamese footballer (born 2002)

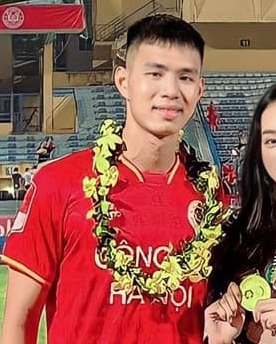
- Tuấn Dương in 2023

Personal information
- Full name: Giáp Tuấn Dương
- Date of birth: 7 September 2002 (age 24)
- Place of birth: Bắc Giang, Vietnam
- Height: 1.76 m (5 ft 9 in)
- Positions: Center-back; left-back

Team information
- Current team: Thép Xanh Nam Định
- Number: 98

Youth career
- 2013–2018: Công An Nhân Dân

Senior career*
Years	Team	Apps	(Gls)
2019–2026	Công An Hà Nội	71	(2)
2026–	Thép Xanh Nam Định	8	(1)

International career^{‡}
2018–2019	Vietnam U16	3	(0)
2019–2020	Vietnam U19	2	(0)
2022–2024	Vietnam U23	2	(0)
2023–2024	Vietnam	5	(0)
- * Club domestic league appearances and goals as of 7 June 2026 ‡ National team caps and goals as of 11 September 2023

Giáp Tuấn Dương (born 7 September 2002) is a Vietnamese professional footballer who plays as a center-back or left-back for V.League 1 club Thép Xanh Nam Định.

== Club career ==
Tuấn Dương was formed in the Công An Nhân Dân youth academy and was promoted to the first team in 2019. He was part of the Công An Nhân Dân team that won the 2022 V.League 2. After he club changed its name into Công An Hà Nội for the 2023 season, he was among the few young players that were kept by the club following the arrival of many quality players to the team. He won the V.League 1 title with Công An Hà Nội, making 10 appearances during the campaign.

In March 2026, Tuấn Dương was transferred to V.League 1 fellow Thép Xanh Nam Định.

== International career ==
Tuấn Dương made his international debut with Vietnam on 11 September 2023 in a 2–0 friendly win against Palestine.

In January 2024, he featured in Vietnam's 26-men squad for the 2023 AFC Asian Cup.

== Honours ==
Công An Hà Nội

- V.League 2: 2022
- V.League 1: 2023
- Vietnamese Cup: 2024–25
- Vietnamese Super Cup: 2025
- ASEAN Club Championship runner-up: 2024–25
