= Trần Văn Công =

Vietnamese footballer (born 1999)

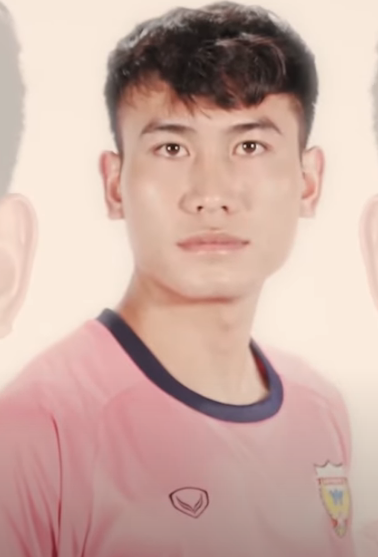
- Văn Công in 2022

Personal information
- Birth name: Trần Văn Công
- Date of birth: 15 February 1999 (age 27)
- Place of birth: Nam Đàn, Nghệ An, Vietnam
- Height: 1.76 m (5 ft 9 in)
- Position: Defensive midfielder

Team information
- Current team: Becamex Ho Chi Minh City
- Number: 37

Youth career
- 2016–2019: Hà Nội

Senior career*
Years	Team	Apps	(Gls)
2019–2023	Hồng Lĩnh Hà Tĩnh	66	(1)
2023–2026	Thép Xanh Nam Định	51	(0)
2026–	Becamex Hồ Chí Minh City	0	(0)

International career^{‡}
2017–2018	Vietnam U19	5	(3)
2021–2022	Vietnam U23	2	(0)
- * Club domestic league appearances and goals as of 7 June 2026 ‡ National team caps and goals as of 1 April 2022

Trần Văn Công (born 15 February 1999) is a Vietnamese professional footballer who plays as a defensive midfielder for V.League 2 club Becamex Hồ Chí Minh City.

== Early career ==
Văn Công was formed in Hà Nội FC's youth academy sector in his hometown Nghệ An. With Hà Nội's youth team, he won the Vietnamese National U-19 Championship in 2016 and 2017, and the Vietnamese National U-21 Championship in 2018.

== Club career ==
In 2019, Văn Công joined V.League 2 club Hồng Lĩnh Hà Tĩnh. He made 12 appearances in his first season with the club, as they were crowned as league champion and promoted to the 2020 V.League 1. He scored his first career goal on 16 April 2023, in Hồng Lĩnh Hà Tĩnh's 3–0 V.League 1 win against Becamex Bình Dương.

In September 2023, after his contract with Hồng Lĩnh Hà Tĩnh expired, Văn Công joined Thép Xanh Nam Định in a free transfer.

In July 2026, Văn Công signed for V.League 2 club Becamex Hồ Chí Minh City.

== International career ==
With the Vietnam under-23s, Văn Công participated in the 2022 AFC U-23 Asian Cup and made once appearance in the 2–0 group stage win against Malaysia.

== Honours ==
Hồng Lĩnh Hà Tĩnh

- V.League 2: 2019

Thép Xanh Nam Định

- V.League 1: 2023–24, 2024–25
- Vietnamese Super Cup: 2024
