= Đặng Văn Tới =

Vietnamese footballer (born 1999)

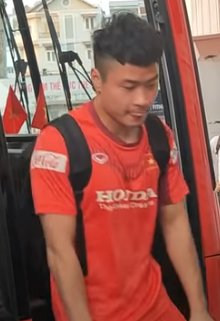
- Đặng Văn Tới in 2019

Personal information
- Full name: Đặng Văn Tới
- Date of birth: 20 January 1999 (age 27)
- Place of birth: Tiền Hải, Thái Bình, Vietnam
- Height: 1.78 m (5 ft 10 in)
- Position: Center-back

Team information
- Current team: Thép Xanh Nam Định
- Number: 5

Youth career
- 2010–2017: Hà Nội

Senior career*
Years	Team	Apps	(Gls)
2017–2022	Hà Nội	16	(1)
2022	→ Hải Phòng (loan)	11	(1)
2023–2025	Hải Phòng	60	(3)
2025–	Thép Xanh Nam Định	22	(0)

International career^{‡}
2017–2019	Vietnam U19	19	(4)
2021–2022	Vietnam U23	5	(1)
- * Club domestic league appearances and goals as of 7 June 2026 ‡ National team caps and goals as of 22 April 2022

Đặng Văn Tới (born 20 January 1999) is a Vietnamese professional footballer who plays as a center-back for V.League 1 club Thép Xanh Nam Định.

== Club career ==
At age 18, Văn Tới was promoted from Hanoi's youth team by first-team manager Chu Đình Nghiêm. On 4 November 2020, he scored Hanoi's 600th V.League 1 goal in a 4–2 victory against Saigon at Hàng Đẫy Stadium.

In August 2022, Văn Tới joined Hải Phòng on loan for the remainder of the season, linking up with former Hà Nội manager Chu Đình Nghiêm. He made his club debut in 2–1 away win against Hoàng Anh Gia Lai on 19 August. Tới scored his first goal for the club, netting the opener in a 1–1 home draw with Hồng Lĩnh Hà Tĩnh.

On 10 January 2023, Hà Nội confirmed they had terminated their contract with Văn Tới by mutual agreement. With Hanoi, he won 7 trophies, including two V.League 1 titles.

After leaving Hanoi, Văn Tới signed a three-year contract with Hải Phòng.

== International career ==
Văn Tới had represented Vietnam at under-19 and under-23 levels.

== Style of play ==
Văn Tới's preferred position is at centre-back, but he can also play as a full-back or a defensive midfielder. His playing style has been compared to that of former Vietnam international Nguyễn Huy Hoàng.

== Honours ==
Hà Nội

- V.League 1: 2018, 2019
- Vietnamese National Cup: 2019, 2020
- Vietnamese Super Cup: 2019, 2020, 2021
