= Trần Mạnh Quỳnh =

Vietnamese footballer

Personal information
- Full name: Trần Mạnh Quỳnh
- Date of birth: 18 January 2001 (age 25)
- Place of birth: Kỳ Sơn, Nghệ An, Vietnam
- Height: 1.70 m (5 ft 7 in)
- Position: Winger

Team information
- Current team: Thép Xanh Nam Định
- Number: 22

Youth career
- 2018–2021: Sông Lam Nghệ An

Senior career*
Years	Team	Apps	(Gls)
2020	→ PVF (loan)		
2021–2026	Sông Lam Nghệ An	87	(8)
2026–	Thép Xanh Nam Định	2	(0)

International career^{‡}
2019–2020	Vietnam U19	10	(1)
2022–2024	Vietnam U23	3	(0)
Medal record
Men's football
Representing Vietnam
AFF U-23 Championship
Winner	Cambodia 2022	Team
- * Club domestic league appearances and goals as of 11 September 2026 ‡ National team caps and goals as of 20 March 2024

Trần Mạnh Quỳnh (born 18 January 2001) is a Vietnamese professional footballer who plays as a winger for V.League 1 club Thép Xanh Nam Định.

== Club career ==
Following his good performances with Sông Lam Nghệ An's youth team, Mạnh Quỳnh was promoted to the first team for the 2021 V.League 1. On 12 April 2021, he made his professional debut and delivered an assist for Phan Văn Đức in his team's 2–0 victory against Becamex Bình Dương.

On 15 July 2023, he scored his first goal in V.League 1, in a 2–0 win against Hồ Chí Minh City.

On 2 July 2026, Mạnh Quỳnh joined league fellow Thép Xanh Nam Định.

== International career ==
Mạnh Quỳnh participated in the 2019 AFF U-18 Youth Championship with Vietnam U18. He appeared in all five group stage games and scored a goal against Singapore as Vietnam failed to qualify for next stage.

He took part in the 2022 AFF U-23 Championship with the Vietnam under-23s. He appeared in the final against Thailand, where Vietnam won 1–0 and was crowned as champions.

== Playing style ==
Mạnh Quỳnh is known for his ability to dribble the ball cleverly with his twists and turns which gives difficulties to his opponents to defend against him. He frequently operated as an offensive wide midfielder or as a left-winger, due to his quality to deliver efficient crosses, as well as due to his ability to cut inside and shoot with his right foot. Mạnh Quỳnh cited Nguyễn Công Phượng as the inspiration for his playing style.

== Honours ==
Vietnam U23

- AFF U-23 Championship: 2022
