= Lê Sỹ Mạnh =

Vietnamese footballer (born 1984)

Personal information
- Full name: Lê Sỹ Mạnh
- Date of birth: 2 December 1984 (age 41)
- Place of birth: Thanh Hóa, Vietnam
- Height: 1.83 m (6 ft 0 in)
- Position: Striker

Youth career
- 2000–2007: Thanh Hóa

Senior career*
Years	Team	Apps	(Gls)
2007–2008	T&T Hanoi		(6)
2009–2010	The Vissai Ninh Bình	32	(8)
2010–2011	Quảng Nam	29	(3)
2011–2012	Xuân Thành Sài Gòn	20	(4)
2012	→ Hanoi ACB (loan)	10	(1)
2013	Thanh Hóa	8	(0)
2014–2015	Hải Phòng	9	(0)

International career
2009–2010	Vietnam	7	(0)
- * Club domestic league appearances and goals

Lê Sỹ Mạnh (born 2 December 1984) is a former Vietnamese footballer who played as a striker. He played for T&T Hanoi, Vissai Ninh Binh, Quang Nam, Xuan Thanh Saigon, Hanoi ACB, Thanh Hoa and Haiphong. He was capped seventh times for Vietnam.

== Controversy ==
In September 2017, he was involved in an incident with Vietnam national football team goalkeeper Đặng Văn Lâm, who after being threatened by Lê Sỹ Mạnh, ran away and injured his ankle.

== Career statistics ==
=== International ===
Appearances and goals by national team and year
National team	Year	Apps	Goals
Vietnam	2009	2	0
Vietnam	2010	5	0
Total		41	6

== Hounors ==
The Vissai Ninh Binh

- V.League 2: 2009

Haiphong FC

- Vietnamese Cup: 2014
- Vietnamese Super Cup runner-up: 2014
