= 2015 Vietnamese Cup =

Tournament details
- Country: Vietnam
- Teams: 22

Final positions
- Champions: Becamex Bình Dương
- Runners-up: Hà Nội T&T

Tournament statistics
- Matches played: 21
- Goals scored: 64 (3.05 per match)

The 2015 National Cup is the 23rd edition of the Vietnamese National Cup. It will be sponsored by Kienlongbank, and known as the Kienlongbank National Cup for sponsorship purposes. It began on the 4 April 2015 and will finish on 26 September 2015.

== Teams ==
Teams in V.League 1 and V.League 2 can enter this cup. There will be a preliminary round, where all 8 teams from V.League 2 and 4 teams in V.League 1: Đồng Nai, Sanna Khánh Hòa, Than Quảng Ninh, and SHB Đà Nẵng will have single-elimination matches to determine the best 6 teams to enter round of 16 with the other 10 teams.

== Preliminary round ==
4 April 2015	Phú Yên	1–1 (7–8 p)	Bình Phước	Phú Yên Stadium
15:30	Ngô Thanh Toàn (yellow card) 16'; Phạm Thanh Tấn 45'	Report	Trương Trọng Sáng 15' (o.g.); Huỳnh Chánh Nghiêm (yellow card) 45'; Phạm Nguyễn Duy Giang (yellow card) 58'; Cao Thạch Sa My (yellow card) 85' (yellow-red card) 90'	Attendance: 2.000; Referee: Nguyễn Hữu Tuấn (Vietnam)

4 April 2015	Đồng Nai	3–1	Hà Nội	Đồng Nai Stadium
16:00	Đặng Trường Xuyên (yellow card) 11'; Ngô Đức Thắng (yellow card) 34'; Nguyễn Hải Anh 40'; Nguyễn Hồng Việt 63'; Phạm Văn Thuần 79' (o.g.)	Report	Nguyễn Xuân Dương 14'; Phạm Văn Thuần (yellow card) 26'; Nguyễn Quang Tú (yellow card) 90'	Attendance: 2.000; Referee: Nguyễn Minh Thuận (Vietnam)

4 April 2015	Sanna Khánh Hòa – BVN	0–1	Đắk Lắk	Nha Trang Stadium
17:00	Nguyễn Viết Bính (yellow card) 10'	Report	Lê Viết Mẫn (yellow card) 7'; Đỗ Thanh Sang 16'; RMah Guch (yellow card) 67'; Huỳnh Văn Ly (yellow card) 86'; Hoàng Văn Thọ (yellow card) 90+3'	Attendance: 3.000; Referee: Ngô Đức Việt (Vietnam)

4 April 2015	Công An Nhân Dân	1–0	Thành phố Hồ Chí Minh	Hàng Đẫy Stadium
18:00	Đậu Văn Toàn 77'	Report	Nguyễn Hữu Tuấn (yellow card) 37'; Phan Thanh Vân (yellow card) 79'; Phạm Đặng Duy An (yellow card) 89'	Attendance: 500; Referee: Nguyễn Viết Duẩn (Vietnam)

4 April 2015	CLB bóng đá Huế	2–2 (2–3 p)	Than Quảng Ninh	Tự Do Stadium
15:30	Nguyễn Ngọc Tuấn Tú 45'; Trương Ngọc Mười 49' (yellow card) 55'; Nguyễn Văn Việt (yellow card) 75'; Nguyễn Văn Cầm (yellow card) 90+2'	Report	Nguyễn Quang Hải 17'; Nguyễn Minh Tùng (yellow card) 47'; Đào Nhật Minh (yellow card) 48'; Lê Bật Hiếu 57'; Nguyễn Mạnh Tuấn Anh (yellow card) 58'	Attendance: 4.000; Referee: Trần Trung Hiếu (Vietnam)

4 April 2015	SHB Đà Nẵng	1–0	Nam Định	Chi Lăng Stadium
17:00	Trần Văn Học (yellow card) 15'; Ngô Quang Huy (yellow card) 29'; Võ Hoàng Quảng (yellow card) 34'; Nguyễn Vũ Phong 89'	Report	Nguyễn Hạ Long (yellow card) 41'; Nguyễn Duy Lâm (yellow card) 49'; Phạm Ngọc Tuấn (yellow card) 56'; Hoàng Ngọc Linh (yellow card) 65'; Đinh Bá Thành (yellow card) 86'; Phạm Văn Nam (yellow card) 88'	Attendance: 1.000; Referee: Đỗ Văn Hiếu (Vietnam)

== Main tournament ==
=== Bracket ===
Preliminary Round; 4 April
Phú Yên	1 (7)
Bình Phước	1 (8)
Đồng Nai	3
Hà Nội	1
Sanna Khánh Hòa	0
Đắk Lắk	1
Công An Nhân Dân	1
TP Hồ Chí Minh	0
CLB bóng đá Huế	2 (2)
Than Quảng Ninh	2 (3)
SHB Đà Nẵng	1
Nam Định	0

Round of 16; 20 June
Đồng Tâm Long An	5
Bình Phước	0
Đồng Nai	3
XSKT Cần Thơ	1
Sông Lam Nghệ An	3
Đắk Lắk	0
Becamex Bình Dương	3
QNK Quảng Nam	1
Hoàng Anh Gia Lai	0 (4)
Công An Nhân Dân	0 (2)
Than Quảng Ninh	2
Hà Nội T&T	5
Thanh Hóa	0
SHB Đà Nẵng	1
Hải Phòng	3
Đồng Tháp	2

Quarterfinals; 24 June
Đồng Tâm Long An	4
Đồng Nai	2
Sông Lam Nghệ An	1
Becamex Bình Dương	2
Hà Nội T&T	2
Hoàng Anh Gia Lai	0
SHB Đà Nẵng	1
Hải Phòng	2

Semifinals; 5 August
Đồng Tâm Long An	3
Becamex Bình Dương	4
Hà Nội T&T	5
Hải Phòng	0

Final; 26 September
Becamex Bình Dương	4
Hà Nội T&T	2

=== Details ===
==== Round of 16 ====
20 June 2015	Đồng Tâm Long An	5-0	Bình Phước	Long An Stadium
16:30	Trần Hoài Nam 8', 80'; Phan Tấn Tài 23'; Ngô Viết Phú 52' (OG); Nguyễn Tài Lộc 67'		Trần Văn Thoại (yellow card) 66'	Attendance: 1000; Referee: Trương Hồng Vũ (Vietnam)

20 June 2015	Đồng Nai	3-1	XSKT Cần Thơ	Đồng Nai Stadium
17:00	Nguyễn Hồng Việt (yellow card) 24'; Kisskka Henry 52'; Trần Hữu Thắng (yellow card) 58' (goal) 66'; Ngô Đức Thắng 63'		Trương Huỳnh Minh Khoa (yellow card) 7'; Lê Ngọc Nam (yellow card) 31'; Trương Công Thảo 32'; Nguyễn Hiêu Trung Anh (yellow card) 78'; Phan Thanh Phúc (yellow card) 80'	Attendance: 800; Referee: Nguyễn Minh Thuận (Vietnam)

20 June 2015	Sông Lam Nghệ An	3-0	Đắk Lắk	Vinh Stadium
17:00	Nguyễn Văn Vinh 6'; Nguyễn Đinh Bảo 18', 25'; Lê Thế Cường (yellow card) 54'; Trần Đức Cường (yellow card) 80'		Phạm Minh Hiếu (yellow card) 49'; Dương Lương Thực (yellow card) 87'	Attendance: 1000; Referee: Trương Trần Quang Tuấn (Vietnam)

20 June 2015	Becamex Bình Dương	3-1	QNK Quảng Nam	Gò Đậu Stadium
17:00	Nguyễn Trọng Hoàng (yellow card) 25' (goal) 45+1'; Lê Công Vinh 49'; Nguyễn Tăng Tuấn 90+1'		Phan Thanh Hưng (yellow card) 27' (goal) 35'; Nguyễn Văn Hậu (yellow card) 44'; Suleiman O.Abdulahi (yellow card) 79'	Attendance: 1000; Referee: Vũ Nguyên Vũ (Vietnam)

20 June 2015	Hoàng Anh Gia Lai	0-0 (4 – 2 p)	Công An Nhân Dân	Pleiku Stadium
17:00	Phan Thanh Hậu (yellow card) 76'; Lê Văn Sơn (yellow card) 84'		Nguyễn Như Tuấn (yellow card) 64'; Dương Quang Tuấn (yellow card) 90'	Attendance: 4000; Referee: Lê Bá Hoài (Vietnam)
	Penalties
	Lê Văn Sơn (penalty scored); Hoàng Thanh Tùng (penalty scored); Bùi Trần Vũ (penalty scored); Nguyễn Công Phượng (penalty scored)		(penalty scored) Nguyễn Như Tuấn; (penalty scored) Phạm Xuân Mạnh; (penalty missed) Đậu Văn Toàn; (penalty missed) Lê Mạnh Dũng

20 June 2015	Than Quảng Ninh	2-5	Hà Nội T&T	Cẩm Phả Stadium
17:30	Lê Tuấn Tú (yellow card) 9'; Đinh Hoàng Max 41'; Vũ Minh Tuấn 74'; Lê Bật Hiếu (yellow card) 88'		Gonzalo Damian Marronkle 10'; Nguyễn Văn Biển (yellow card) 31' (goal) 70'; Nguyễn Văn Quyết 72', 78'; Hoàng Vũ Samson 90+1'	Attendance: 5000; Referee: Ngô Quốc Hưng (Vietnam)

20 June 2015	Thanh Hóa	0-1	SHB Đà Nẵng	Thanh Hóa Stadium
17:00	Lê Văn Tân (yellow card) 33'; Page Omar Faye (yellow card) 53'; Cao Sỹ Cường (yellow card) 82' (yellow-red card) 90+4'		Perez Rosseaux Yaikel 38' (yellow card) 75'; Nguyễn Vũ Phong (yellow card) 84'; Hồ Ngọc Thắng (yellow card) 84' (yellow-red card) 90+4'; Võ Hoàng Quảng (yellow card) 90+1'	Attendance: 2000; Referee: Trần Trung Hiếu (Vietnam)

20 June 2015	Hải Phòng	3-2	Đồng Tháp	Lạch Tray Stadium
17:00	Nguyễn Việt Phong 11', 14'; Trần Đức Dương 28'; Vũ Ngọc Thịnh (yellow card) 57'; Errol Anthony Stevens (yellow card) 85'		Nguyễn Thiện Chí 60'; Nguyễn Vĩnh Đức 81'; Nguyễn Vĩnh Đức (yellow card) 90+1'	Attendance: 3000; Referee: Ngô Đức Việt (Vietnam)

==== Quarterfinals ====
24 June 2015	Đồng Tâm Long An	4-2	Đồng Nai	Long An Stadium
16:30	Phan Văn Tài Em 37', 68', 71'; Nguyễn Thanh Hải 90+2'; Souleymane Diabate (yellow card) 89'		Nsi Amougou Jose 63', 72'	Attendance: 2000; Referee: Nguyễn Quốc Hùng

24 June 2015	SHB Đà Nẵng	1-2	Hải Phòng	Chi Lăng Stadium
17:00	Phạm Nguyên Sa 30'		Trần Đức Dương (yellow card) 28'; Nguyễn Văn Đức (yellow card) 39'; Lê Văn Phú (yellow card) 45+1'; Errol Anthony Stevens 53', 87'; Vũ Ngọc Thịnh (yellow card) 71'; Andre Diego Fagan (yellow card) 90+4'	Attendance: 7000; Referee: Ngô Mạnh Cường

24 June 2015	Sông Lam Nghệ An	1-2	Becamex Bình Dương	Vinh Stadium
17:30	Ouattara Baba S.A Ffoloh (yellow card) 45+1'; Nguyễn Quang Tình 47' (pen.); Phạm Mạnh Hùng (yellow card) 52'		Nguyễn Anh Đức 19'; Cheikh Abass Dieng 53' (pen.)	Attendance: 2000; Referee: Nguyễn Trung Kiên (B)

24 June 2015	Hà Nội T&T	2-0	Hoàng Anh Gia Lai	Hàng Đẫy Stadium
18:30	Hoàng Vũ Olaleye Samson 42', 83'; Victor Manuel Ormazabal (yellow card) 59'		Phan Thanh Hậu (yellow card) 25'; Nguyễn Minh Nhựt (yellow card) 40'	Attendance: 1000; Referee: Trần Đình Thịnh

==== Semifinals ====
5 August 2015	Đồng Tâm Long An	3-4	Becamex Bình Dương	Long An Stadium
16:30	Trần Bảo Anh (yellow card) 21'; Phan Thanh Giang (yellow card) 44' (yellow-red card) 88'; Phan Văn Tài Em 46', 86'; Santos Lima 49'; Huỳnh Tấn Tài (yellow card) 78'; Huỳnh Quang Thanh (yellow card) 90+4'		Cheikh Abass Dieng 4', 11', 42' (yellow card) 85'; Moses Oloya (yellow card) 66'; Lê Tấn Tài 90+2'; Nguyễn Anh Đức (yellow card) 90+3'	Attendance: 5000; Referee: Nguyễn Đức Vũ

5 August 2015	Hà Nội T&T	5-0	Hải Phòng	Hàng Đẫy Stadium
18:30	Gonzalo Damian Marronkle 3', 41'; Trần Anh Đức (yellow card) 59'; Nguyễn Văn Nam 63' (o.g.); Nguyễn Văn Quyết 76'; Nguyễn Ngọc Duy 78'		Lê Văn Phú (yellow card) 8'; Nguyễn Văn Nam (yellow card) 26'; Nguyễn Anh Hùng (yellow card) 46'; Vương Quốc Trung (yellow card) 63'	Attendance: 3000; Referee: Hoàng Phạm Công Khanh

==== Final ====
26 September 2015	Becamex Bình Dương	4-2	Hà Nội T&T	Gò Đậu Stadium
17:00	Cheikh Abass Dieng 20'; Lê Công Vinh 30'; Nguyễn Anh Đức (yellow card) 41'; Nguyễn Trọng Hoàng 49', 78'; Nguyễn Trọng Hoàng (yellow card) 89'; Mai Tiến Thành (yellow card) 90+3'		Hoàng Vũ Samson (yellow card) 41'; Gonzalo D. Maronkle 62'; Dương Thanh Hào (red card) 66'; Sầm Ngọc Đức (yellow card) 77'; Hoàng Vũ Samson 86'; Victor (yellow card) 90+4'	Attendance: 14000; Referee: Nguyễn Đức Vũ
