= 2010 Vietnamese Cup =

Tournament details
- Country: Vietnam

Final positions
- Champions: Sông Lam Nghệ An
- Runners-up: Hoàng Anh Gia Lai

The 2010 Vietnamese Cup was the 18th edition of the Vietnamese National Cup. The contest began on 23 January 2010 and finished on 28 August 2010.

The cup winner were guaranteed a place in the 2011 AFC Cup.

== First round ==
23 January 2010	Hà Nội ACB	2–2 (4–2 p)	Hà Nội T&T	Hàng Đẫy Stadium
17:00	Alejo 13'; Thanh Nguyên 50'; Alejo (red card) 68'	Report	Công Vinh 53', 73'	Attendance: 300; Referee: Nguyễn Văn Đông
	Penalties
	TBD		TBD

23 January 2010	Thành phố Hồ Chí Minh	0–1	XSKT Cần Thơ	Thống Nhất Stadium
18:00		Report	Quang Trãi 53'	Attendance: 2,000; Referee: Trần Trung Hiếu

24 January 2010	Than Quảng Ninh	0–2	Viettel	Cửa Ông Stadium, Cẩm Phả
15:00		Report	Văn Hà 8'; Văn Mạnh 10'	Attendance: 500; Referee: Nguyễn Quốc Hùng

24 January 2010	Megastar Nam Định	1–0	Huda Huế	Thiên Trường Stadium
15:30	Okoro 15'	Report		Attendance: 1,000; Referee: Phạm Bá Hoà

24 January 2010	Navibank Sài Gòn	0–1	Đồng Nai Berjaya	Thống Nhất Stadium
15:30		Report	Anthony 47'	Attendance: 1,000; Referee: Ngô Quốc Hưng

24 January 2010	Hùng Vương An Giang	1–2	Hoàng Anh Gia Lai	An Giang Stadium
15:30	Văn Cường 41'	Report	Đoàn Văn Nirut 21'; Đoàn Văn Sakda 44'	Attendance: 2,500; Referee: Nguyễn Trung Kiên

24 January 2010	Hòa Phát Hà Nội	3–1	Quảng Nam	Thống Nhất Stadium
15:30	Thanh Trung 44'; Kleber 84'; Eduardo 90+2'	Report	Đức Nhật 6'; Bình Minh (red card) 90+3'	Attendance: 1,500; Referee: Nguyễn Ngọc Châu

24 January 2010	Khatoco Khánh Hòa	2–1	XM Fico Tây Ninh	Nha Trang Stadium
16:00	Agostinho 27'; Quang Hải 66'	Report	Tôn Vĩnh 42'; Viễn Đông (yellow card) 45+2' (yellow-red card) 65'	Attendance: 1,500; Referee: Nguyễn Văn Quyết

24 January 2010	Vissai Ninh Bình	2–1	SQC Bình Định	Ninh Bình Stadium
17:00	Việt Thắng 22'; Gustavo 73'	Report	Kim Bình 7'	Attendance: 2,000; Referee: Nguyễn Phi Long

24 January 2010	Đồng Tâm Long An	3–2	Hải Nhân Tiền Giang	Long An Stadium
17:00	Thanh Giang 28', 80'; Minh Phương 62'	Report	Din Akama 25'; Đinh Cường 74'	Attendance: 1,500; Referee: Đào Văn Cường

Byes: Đà Nẵng, Bình Dương, Sông Lam Nghệ An, Hải Phòng, Thanh Hóa, Đồng Tháp

== Second round ==
19 February 2010	SHB Đà Nẵng	2–0	Thành phố Cần Thơ	Cần Thơ Stadium, Cần Thơ
16:00	Quốc Anh 70'; Nicolás Hernández 77'		Thái Phong (yellow card) 17' (yellow-red card) 42'	Attendance: 10,000; Referee: Hoàng Anh Tuấn

19 February 2010	Khatoco Khánh Hòa	0–1	Becamex Bình Dương	Nha Trang Stadium
16:00			Alves 52'	Attendance: 1,500; Referee: Võ Minh Trí

21 February 2010	Hòa Phát Hà Nội	0–0 (5–4 p)	Vicem Hải Phòng	Hàng Đẫy Stadium
15:30				Attendance: 3,000; Referee: Nguyễn Văn Quyết
	Penalties
	TBD		TBD

21 February 2010	Megastar Nam Định	1–0	Hà Nội ACB	Thiên Trường Stadium
15:30	Danh Ngọc 53'		Cristian (yellow card) 41' (yellow-red card) 45+3'	Attendance: 1,500; Referee: Đỗ Quốc Hoài

21 February 2010	Đồng Nai Berjaya	0–2	TĐCS Đồng Tháp	Biên Hòa Stadium
15:30			Kayode 50'; Được Em 74'	Attendance: 1,000; Referee: Nguyễn Quốc Hùng

21 February 2010	Đồng Tâm Long An	1–1 (4–5 p)	Hoàng Anh Gia Lai	Long An Stadium, Tân An
16:00	Hoàng Lâm 90+7'		Việt Cường 47'	Attendance: 3,000; Referee: Trần Công Trọng
	Penalties
	TBD		TBD

21 February 2010	Sông Lam Nghệ An	3–0	Viettel	Vinh Stadium
16:30	Vidovic 11', 31', 78'			Attendance: 4,000; Referee: Nguyễn Văn Kiên

21 February 2010	Vissai Ninh Bình	3–0	Lam Sơn Thanh Hóa	Ninh Bình Stadium, Ninh Bình
17:00	Ngọc Huy 21'; Sỹ Mạnh 34'; Gustavo 88'		Tony (yellow card) 20' (yellow-red card) 86'	Attendance: 5,000; Referee: Nguyễn Trọng Thư

== Quarterfinals ==
27 March 2010	Megastar Nam Định	1–0	Vissai Ninh Bình	Thiên Trường Stadium
16:00	Danh Ngọc 46'			Attendance: 5,000; Referee: Nguyễn Văn Quyết

27 March 2010	Sông Lam Nghệ An	2–1	Hòa Phát Hà Nội	Vinh Stadium
17:00	Silveira 5'; Vidovic 83'		Công Danh 62'	Attendance: 3,000; Referee: Đào Văn Cường

28 March 2010	SHB Đà Nẵng	4–0	TĐCS Đồng Tháp	Tự Do Stadium
16:00	Nguyễn Rogerio 22', 60'; Minh Triết 41' (o.g.); Mendez 89'			Attendance: 1,500; Referee: Hoàng Anh Tuấn

29 March 2010	Hoàng Anh Gia Lai	1–1 (6–5 p)	Becamex Bình Dương	Thiên Trường Stadium
16:00	Văn Trương 36'		Alves 54'	Referee: Võ Minh Trí
	Penalties
	TBD		TBD

== Semi-finals ==
24 April 2010
16:00

SHB Đà Nẵng	1–1	Hoàng Anh Gia Lai
Trương Quang Tuấn 90'	Report	Evaldo 14'
Penalties
	2–4

Chi Lăng Stadium, Da Nang
Attendance: 20,000
Referee: Đào Văn Chương

25 April 2010
17:00

Sông Lam Nghệ An F.C.	3–0	Megastar Nam Định
Vidovic 50', 61'; Silveira 73'	Report	Trần Thành Chung (red card) 47'

Vinh Stadium, Vinh
Attendance: 7,000
Referee: Vũ Bảo Linh

== Final ==
28 August 2010
15:30

Sông Lam Nghệ An	1–0	Hoàng Anh Gia Lai
Ekpoki 25'	Report

Thống Nhất Stadium, Ho Chi Minh City
Attendance: 7,000
Referee: Phùng Đình Dũng
