= 2009 Vietnamese Cup =

Tournament details
- Country: Vietnam
- Dates: 31 January – 29 August
- Teams: 27

Final positions
- Champions: SHB Da Nang FC
- Runners-up: Viettel FC (The Cong)

Tournament statistics
- Matches played: 26
- Goals scored: 65 (2.5 per match)
- All statistics correct as of 19 April 2021.

The 2009 Vietnamese Cup (known as the Bamboo Airways National Cup for sponsorship reasons) season was the 17th edition of the Vietnamese National Cup, the football knockout competition of Vietnam organized by the Vietnam Football Federation.

Five teams (Viettel Football Club (The Cong, in season), Becamex Binh Duong FC, Nam Dinh Football Club, Khanh Hoa FC and Ha Noi ACB F.C.) had an automatica qualification bye in the first round for the round of 16.

== First round ==
Jan 31 1	Hoa Phat	0-0*	Hai Phong FC	Vietnam
		Report
Note: *[5-4 pen]

Feb 1 1	Quang Nam FC	3-0	XMCT.Thanh Hoa	Vietnam
		Report

Feb 1 1	T&T Ha Noi	2-1	Quang Ngai FC	Vietnam
		Report

Feb 1 1	Than Quang Ninh FC	0-1	Quan khu 4	Vietnam
		Report

Feb 1 1	SLNA	2-0	Huda Hue F.C.	Vietnam
		Report

Feb 1 1	Dong Nai FC	2-1	Binh Dinh FC	Vietnam
		Report

Feb 1 1	Da Nang	2-0	An Do-An Giang	Vietnam
		Report

Feb 1 1	Tay Ninh F.C.	0-1	TDCS Dong Thap F.C.	Vietnam
		Report

Feb 1 1	HAGL	3-2	Saigon United F.C.	Vietnam
		Report

Feb 1 1	Tien Giang FC	0-2	DTLA	Vietnam
		Report

Feb 1 1	TP.HCM	1-2	Can Tho FC	Vietnam
		Report

== Round of 16 ==
Feb 21 Round of 16	Ha Noi ACB	2-1	Hoa Phat	Vietnam
		Report

Feb 22 Round of 16	BHTS Quang Nam	0-1	Viettel FC (The Cong)	Vietnam
		Report

Feb 22 Round of 16	T&T Ha Noi	3-3*	Quan khu 4	Vietnam
		Report
Note: *[2-4 pen]

Feb 22 Round of 16	SLNA	1-0	Nam Dinh FC	Vietnam
		Report

Feb 22 Round of 16	Khanh Hoa FC	1-0	Dong Nai FC	Vietnam
		Report

Feb 22 Round of 16	SHB Da Nang FC	2-1	TDCS Dong Thap F.C.	Vietnam
		Report

Feb 22 Round of 16	HAGL FC	1-0	DTLA	Vietnam
		Report

Feb 22 Round of 16	Can Tho FC	1-3	Binh Duong	Vietnam
		Report

== Quarter–final round ==
Apr 4 Quarter–final	Ha Noi ACB	1-2	Viettel FC (The Cong)	Vietnam
		Report

Apr 4 Quarter–final	Quan khu 4	0-0*	Song Lam Nghe An FC (SLNA)	Vietnam
		Report
Note: *[1-3 pen]

Apr 4 Quarter–final	Khanh Hoa FC	0-3	SHB Da Nang FC	Vietnam
		Report

Jul 15 Quarter–final	Hoàng Anh Gia Lai F.C. (HAGL)	1-2	Becamex Binh Duong FC	Vietnam
		Report

== Semi-finals ==
Jul 29 Semi-Final	Viettel FC (The Cong)	4-1	Song Lam Nghe An FC (SLNA)	Vietnam
	Khanh Lam 20; Reginaldo 42; D.Silva 44; Van Hien 81	Report	Din Akame 74

Jul 29 Semi-Final	SHB Da Nang FC	3-3*	Becamex Binh Duong FC	Vietnam
	Merlo 9, 87; Quoc Anh 15	Report	Philani 4, 84, 89.
Note: *[3-0 pen]

== Final ==
Aug 29 Final	Viettel FC (The Cong)	0-1	SHB Da Nang FC	Vietnam
		Report	Merlo 77

== Finalist players ==
=== Viettel FC (The Cong) Squad ===
As of 29 August 2009

Note: Flags indicate national team as defined under FIFA eligibility rules; some limited exceptions apply. Players may hold more than one non-FIFA nationality.

No.	Pos.	Nation	Player
1	GK	VIE	Manh Dung
2	DF	VIE	Quoc Long
3	DF	VIE	Anh Tuan
4	DF	VIE	Xuan Hop
6	DF	VIE	Duy Linh
5	MF	VIE	Xuan Thanh
8	MF	VIE	Van Hien
10	MF	VIE	Bao Khanh
11	FW	BRA	Reginaldo
7	FW	MKD	Gilson Da Silva
9	FW	BRA	De Oliviera
19	MF	VIE	Khanh Lam
16	MF	VIE	Quang Vinh
18	FW	VIE	Cong Huy

=== SHB Da Nang FC Squad ===
As of 29 August 2009

Note: Flags indicate national team as defined under FIFA eligibility rules; some limited exceptions apply. Players may hold more than one non-FIFA nationality.

No.	Pos.	Nation	Player
1	GK	VIE	Duc Cuong
2	DF	VIE	Cao Cuong
3	DF	VIE	Hoang Quang
4	DF	VIE	Phuoc Vinh
6	DF	VIE	Van Hoc
5	MF	BRA	Nguyễn Rogerio
8	MF	VIE	Nguyen Sa
10	MF	VIE	Quang Tuan
11	FW	VIE	Van Meo
7	FW	VIE	Quoc Anh
9	FW	BRA	Diego Oliveira Silva
19	MF	VIE	Quang Cuong
16	MF	VIE	Thanh Phuc
18	FW	ARG	Gastón Merlo
