= 2011 V-League =

V-League
- Season: 2011
- Dates: 22 January – 21 August
- Champions: Sông Lam Nghệ An; 3rd title
- Runner up: Hà Nội T&T
- Relegated: Đồng Tâm Long An; Hà Nội ACB
- 2012 AFC Cup: Sông Lam Nghệ An; Navibank Sài Gòn
- Matches: 182
- Goals: 554 (3.04 per match)
- Average goals/game: 3.1
- Top goalscorer: (Argentina) Gastón Merlo (21 goals)

The 2011 V-League was the 28th season of Vietnam's national football league and the 11th as a professional league.

Eximbank have taken over as official sponsor of the V-League.

== Teams ==
Nam Định were relegated to the 2011 Vietnamese First Division after finishing the 2010 season in last place.

They were replaced by Hà Nội ACB.

Navibank Sài Gòn defeated Than Quảng Ninh in the end of season promotion/relegation match to secure their place in the V-League.

=== Stadia and locations ===
Locations of the V.League 2011 teams

Club	Based	Home stadium	Capacity	First season in V-League	Manager
Becamex Bình Dương	Thủ Dầu Một	Gò Đậu Stadium	18,250	2004	(Vietnam) Đặng Trần Chỉnh
Đồng Tâm Long An	Tân An	Long An Stadium	19,975	2003	(Croatia) Ranko Buketa
Cao su Đồng Tháp	Cao Lãnh	Cao Lãnh Stadium	20,000	2000	(Vietnam) Phạm Công Lộc
Hà Nội ACB	Hanoi	Hàng Đẫy Stadium	22,500	2004	(Argentina) Mauricio Giganti
Hòa Phát Hà Nội	Hanoi	Hàng Đẫy Stadium	22,500	2003	(Vietnam) Nguyễn Thành Vinh
Hoàng Anh Gia Lai	Pleiku	Pleiku Stadium	15,000	2003	(Vietnam) Huỳnh Văn Ảnh
Khatoco Khánh Hòa	Nha Trang	August 19th Stadium	25,000	2000	(Vietnam) Hoàng Anh Tuấn
Lam Sơn Thanh Hóa	Thanh Hóa	Thanh Hóa Stadium	14,000	2010	(Vietnam) Đàm Văn Hải
Navibank Sài Gòn	Ho Chi Minh City	Thống Nhất Stadium	25,000	2010	(Vietnam) Mai Đức Chung
SHB Đà Nẵng	Đà Nẵng	Chi Lăng Stadium	30,000	2001	(Vietnam) Lê Huỳnh Đức
Sông Lam Nghệ An	Vinh	Vinh Stadium	22,000	2000	(Vietnam) Nguyễn Hữu Thắng
Hà Nội T&T	Hanoi	Hàng Đẫy Stadium	22,500	2008	(Vietnam) Phan Thanh Hùng
Vicem Hải Phòng	Hải Phòng	Lạch Tray Stadium	28,000	2000	(Vietnam) Nguyễn Đình Hưng
Vissai Ninh Bình	Ninh Bình	Ninh Bình Stadium	22,000	2010	(Vietnam) Nguyễn Văn Sỹ

=== Managerial changes ===
Team	Outgoing manager	Manner of departure	Incoming manager
Đồng Tâm Long An	(Portugal) Ricardo Formosinho	Short-term contract	(Argentina) Marcelo Javier Zuleta
Đồng Tâm Long An	(Argentina) Marcelo Javier Zuleta	Sacked	(Brazil) Marco Barbosa
Đồng Tâm Long An	(Brazil) Marco Barbosa	Sacked	(England) Simon McMenemy
Hoàng Anh Gia Lai	(Thailand) Dusit Chalermsan	Resigned	(Vietnam) Huỳnh Văn Ảnh
Bình Dương	(Portugal) Ricardo Formosinho	Sacked	(Vietnam) Đặng Trần Chỉnh
Đồng Tâm Long An	(England) Simon McMenemy	Sacked	(Croatia) Ranko Buketa

== League table ==
Pos	Team	Pld	W	D	L	GF	GA	GD	Pts	Qualification or relegation
1	Sông Lam Nghệ An (C, Q)	26	15	4	7	48	29	+19	49	2012 AFC Cup Group stage
2	Hà Nội T&T	26	13	7	6	51	31	+20	46	
3	SHB Đà Nẵng	26	12	8	6	49	32	+17	44	
4	Vissai Ninh Bình	26	11	6	9	37	35	+2	39	
5	TĐCS Đồng Tháp	26	10	7	9	38	44	−6	37	
6	Becamex Bình Dương	26	9	9	8	40	42	−2	36	
7	Thanh Hóa	26	9	7	10	44	41	+3	34	
8	Navibank Sài Gòn (Q)	26	9	7	10	36	37	−1	34	2012 AFC Cup Group stage (Note: Qualified by winning the 2011 Vietnamese Cup.)
9	Hoàng Anh Gia Lai	26	8	8	10	49	46	+3	32	
10	Hòa Phát Hà Nội	26	9	5	12	38	40	−2	32	
11	Khatoco Khánh Hòa	26	9	5	12	28	34	−6	32	
12	Hải Phòng	26	7	9	10	28	40	−12	30	
13	Đồng Tâm Long An (R)	26	8	6	12	31	44	−13	30	Relegation to Vietnamese First Division
14	Hà Nội ACB (R)	26	8	2	16	36	58	−22	26	Relegation to Vietnamese First Division

Updated to match(es) played on 21 August 2011. Source: Soccerway
Rules for classification: 1) points; 2) goal difference; 3) number of goals scored.
(C) Champions; (Q) Qualified for the phase indicated; (R) Relegated

=== Positions by round ===
Team ╲ Round	1	2	3	4	5	6	7	8	9	10	11	12	13	14	15	16	17	18	19	20	21	22	23	24	25	26
Sông Lam Nghệ An	5	2	1	5	6	5	2	2	1	1	1	1	1	1	1	1	1	1	1	1	1	1	1	1	1	1
Hà Nội T&T	2	1	4	8	11	8	4	7	6	5	4	4	5	5	5	5	5	4	3	3	2	2	2	2	2	2
SHB Đà Nẵng	2	6	2	1	1	1	3	3	3	2	3	3	2	2	2	2	2	2	2	2	3	3	3	3	3	3
Vissai Ninh Bình	7	10	13	13	12	12	12	11	8	8	10	7	8	11	10	10	10	10	9	10	10	9	9	7	4	4
TĐCS Đồng Tháp	9	4	6	4	2	3	1	1	2	3	2	2	3	3	3	4	4	5	6	5	5	6	5	6	7	5
Becamex Bình Dương	8	3	9	11	7	6	5	8	9	7	8	8	9	7	9	8	8	6	5	6	6	4	4	4	5	6
Thanh Hóa	1	7	12	7	8	11	11	12	12	10	6	5	4	4	4	3	3	3	4	4	4	5	6	5	6	7
Navibank Sài Gòn	9	11	5	3	5	2	6	6	7	11	9	10	7	8	6	6	7	8	7	8	7	7	8	9	8	8
Hoàng Anh Gia Lai	11	13	11	12	9	9	7	4	5	6	7	9	11	9	7	7	6	7	8	7	8	8	7	8	9	9
Hòa Phát Hà Nội	11	5	10	6	3	4	8	9	10	12	12	12	10	10	8	11	9	9	12	9	9	10	10	12	11	10
Khatoco Khánh Hòa	13	8	3	2	4	7	10	5	4	4	5	6	6	6	11	12	12	12	13	13	12	13	14	13	10	11
Hải Phòng	4	9	8	10	10	10	9	10	11	9	11	11	12	13	13	9	11	11	10	11	11	14	11	10	12	12
Đồng Tâm Long An	6	12	7	9	13	13	13	13	13	14	13	14	14	14	14	14	14	14	14	14	14	12	13	11	13	13
Hà Nội ACB	14	14	14	14	14	14	14	14	14	13	14	13	13	12	12	13	13	13	11	12	13	11	12	14	14	14

Winner; AFC Cup
Relegate to V.League 2

Source: Eximbank V-League

== Results ==
Home \ Away	BBD	SDN	ĐLA	TDT	ACB	VHP	HHN	HGL	KKH	NVB	SNA	T&T	THO	VNB
Becamex Bình Dương		1–1	2–1	0–0	2–0	0–1	2–1	2–2	1–3	3–1	1–4	1–1	4–3	1–1
SHB Đà Nẵng	1–1		2–0	2–1	3–1	3–1	2–0	2–1	1–1	2–2	3–1	1–3	0–0	2–1
Đồng Tâm Long An	1–2	0–3		1–1	4–1	1–1	2–3	4–3	2–1	1–1	2–2	0–2	0–3	2–2
TĐCS Đồng Tháp	2–0	3–2	1–2		3–0	2–0	3–1	1–1	2–2	0–2	3–2	3–1	2–0	2–0
Hà Nội ACB	3–3	2–1	3–1	2–0		5–0	3–2	1–3	1–0	2–1	2–3	1–2	2–1	2–3
Hải Phòng	2–2	1–1	0–0	1–1	2–2		2–1	1–1	1–0	2–0	1–0	1–3	2–1	2–3
Hòa Phát Hà Nội	2–1	2–4	0–1	1–1	2–1	1–1		1–2	4–1	2–0	2–1	2–0	3–0	2–1
Hoàng Anh Gia Lai	1–2	1–0	3–0	2–3	6–1	4–2	1–1		1–0	1–1	0–1	4–1	2–2	2–3
Khatoco Khánh Hòa	0–2	2–1	1–0	4–1	1–0	0–2	1–1	2–1		1–1	1–0	1–0	4–2	0–1
Navibank Sài Gòn	3–2	3–3	0–1	0–0	5–0	2–0	2–0	2–1	2–1		0–1	2–4	3–1	3–0
Sông Lam Nghệ An	0–1	1–0	1–0	6–2	2–0	3–1	2–1	2–2	4–0	3–1		1–1	3–0	1–0
Hà Nội T&T	2–2	0–2	4–1	7–1	3–1	1–0	2–1	6–2	1–1	4–0	0–0		0–0	2–1
Thanh Hóa	4–1	3–3	1–2	3–0	3–0	1–1	3–1	2–2	1–0	2–0	2–3	1–0		3–1
Vissai Ninh Bình	2–1	0–4	1–2	2–0	2–0	2–0	1–1	3–0	1–0	0–0	3–1	1–1	2–2	

Updated to match(es) played on unknown. Source: Eximbank V-League
Legend: Blue = home team win; Yellow = draw; Red = away team win.

== Top goalscorers ==
The Top Scorers as of 17 July 2011:

Rank	Name	Team	Goals
1	(Argentina) Gastón Merlo	Đà Nẵng	21
2	(Brazil) Evaldo	Hoàng Anh Gia Lai	20
3	(Nigeria) Samson Kayode	Đồng Tháp	17
4	(Argentina) Lucas Cantoro	Hà Nội ACB	16
5	(Senegal) Pape Omar Fayé	Thanh Hóa	15
6	(Nigeria) Timothy Anjembe	Hòa Phát Hà Nội	13
6	(Brazil) Gustavo Dourado	The Vissai Ninh Bình	13
8	(Argentina) Gonzalo Marronkle	Hà Nội T&T	12
9	(Brazil) Thiago	Hải Phòng	11
10	(Brazil) Leandro	Bình Dương	10
10	(Vietnam) Lê Công Vinh	Hà Nội T&T	10
10	(Vietnam) Hoàng Đình Tùng	Thanh Hóa	10

== Awards ==
=== Monthly awards ===
Month	Club of the Month	Coach of the Month		Player of the Month		Best goal(s) of the Month	
Month	Club of the Month	Coach	Club	Player	Club	Player	Club
April	Sông Lam Nghệ An	(Vietnam) Nguyễn Hữu Thắng	Sông Lam Nghệ An	(Vietnam) Hoàng Đình Tùng	Thanh Hóa	(Tanzania) Danny Mrwanda	Đồng Tâm Long An
May	Sông Lam Nghệ An	(Vietnam) Nguyễn Hữu Thắng	Sông Lam Nghệ An	(Argentina) Gastón Merlo	SHB Đà Nẵng	(South Africa) Philani	Becamex Bình Dương
June	Becamex Bình Dương	(Vietnam) Phan Thanh Hùng	Hà Nội T&T	(Vietnam) Lê Công Vinh	Hà Nội T&T	(Vietnam) Nguyễn Tăng Tuấn	Hoàng Anh Gia Lai
July	Hà Nội T&T	(Vietnam) Phan Thanh Hùng	Hà Nội T&T	(Brazil) Gustavo Dourado	Vissai Ninh Bình	TBD	

=== Annual awards ===
==== Dream Team ====
Goalkeepers	Defenders	Midfielders	Forwards
(Vietnam) Nguyễn Huỳnh Quốc Cường (Sông Lam Nghệ An)	(Vietnam) Trần Đình Đồng (Sông Lam Nghệ An) (Brazil) Cristiano Roland (Hà Nội T&T) (Vietnam) Nguyễn Hoàng Helio (Sông Lam Nghệ An) (Vietnam) Nguyễn Quốc Long (Hà Nội T&T)	(Vietnam) Lê Công Vinh (Hà Nội T&T) (Ghana) Owusu-Ansah (Sông Lam Nghệ An) (Vietnam) Nguyễn Trọng Hoàng (Sông Lam Nghệ An) (Vietnam) Nguyễn Văn Quyết (Hà Nội T&T)	(Argentina) Gastón Merlo (SHB Đà Nẵng) (Nigeria) Samson Kayode (Đồng Tháp)
