= 2013 Vietnamese Cup =

Tournament details
- Country: Vietnam

Final positions
- Champions: XM The Vissai Ninh Bình
- Runners-up: SHB Đà Nẵng

The 2013 Vietnamese Cup was the 21st edition of the Vietnamese National Cup. It began on the 16 March 2013 and ended on 5 September 2013.

== First round ==
16 March 2013	TĐCS Đồng Tháp	0–0 (2–4 p)	QNK Quảng Nam	Cao Lãnh Stadium
15:30		Report		Attendance: 1,000; Referee: Bùi Minh Hưng
	Penalties
	TBD		TBD

16 March 2013	Hùng Vương An Giang	4–0	XSKT Cần Thơ	An Giang Stadium, Long Xuyên
15:30	Lê Tostao 46'; Duy Phương 59', 90+3'; Thanh Nguyên 85'; Phương Duy (yellow card) 40' (yellow-red card) 54'	Report		Attendance: 1,500; Referee: Lê Khắc Thành

== Second round ==
24 March 2013	QNK Quảng Nam	1–0	Vicem Hải Phòng	Quảng Nam Stadium, Tam Kỳ
15:30	David 51'			Attendance: 3,000; Referee: Đinh Văn Dũng

25 March 2013	Hà Nội T&T	3–3 (5–3 p)	Kienlongbank Kiên Giang	Hàng Đẫy Stadium, Hà Nội
16:00	Bảo Khanh 3'; Văn Hiếu 29'; Kayode 80'		Jackson 38'; Minh Trung 68'; Thanh Sang 81'	Attendance: 2,000; Referee: Trần Trung Hiếu
	Penalties
	TBD		TBD

25 March 2013	Hoàng Anh Gia Lai	2–1	Sàigòn Xuân Thành	Pleiku Stadium
16:00	Evaldo 25'; Hoàng Thiên 90+3'		Emeka 39'	Attendance: 3,000; Referee: Nguyễn Trọng Thư

25 March 2013	SHB Đà Nẵng	3–2	Becamex Bình Dương	Chi Lăng Stadium
16:30	David 4', 7'; Minh Tuấn 65'		Công Huy 22'; Kesley Alves 24'	Attendance: 12,000; Referee: Bùi Thành Thanh Nghĩa

26 March 2013	Hùng Vương An Giang	1–5	Đồng Tâm Long An	An Giang Stadium, Long Xuyên
15:30	Iheruome 68'		Campos 40'; Việt Thắng 58', 80'; Văn Cường 66', 78'	Attendance: 1,000; Referee: Hoàng Phạm Công Khanh

26 March 2013	Đồng Nai	3–1	SQC Bình Định	Biên Hòa Stadium
15:30	Nyirenda 2', 68'; Đình Hiệp 88'		Văn Triền 84'	Attendance: 1,500; Referee: Phùng Quốc Quân

26 March 2013	Thanh Hóa	0–0 (4–2 p)	Sông Lam Nghệ An	Thanh Hóa Stadium
16:00				Attendance: 6,000; Referee: Phùng Đình Dũng
	Penalties
	TBD		TBD

26 March 2013	XM The Vissai Ninh Bình	2–1	Than Quảng Ninh	Ninh Bình Stadium
16:00	Đinh Văn Ta 36'; Anh Tuấn 63'		Hải Huy 5'	Attendance: 6,000; Referee: Kiều Việt Hùng

== Quarter-finals ==
10 July 2013	Thanh Hóa	0–1	Đồng Nai	Thanh Hóa Stadium
17:00	Văn Duyệt (yellow card) 9' (yellow-red card) 62'	Report	Hữu Thắng 25'	Attendance: 5,000; Referee: Phùng Đình Dũng

10 July 2013	XM The Vissai Ninh Bình	2–1	Hoàng Anh Gia Lai	Ninh Bình Stadium
17:00	Văn Quyến 16', 29'	Report	Ngọc Anh 63' (o.g.)	Attendance: 2,000; Referee: Hoàng Anh Tuấn

11 July 2013	SHB Đà Nẵng	3–0	QNK Quảng Nam	Chi Lăng Stadium, Đà Nẵng
16:30	Merlo 49', 58'; Quốc Anh 51'	Report		Attendance: 9,000; Referee: Phùng Quốc Quân

11 July 2013	Đồng Tâm Long An	2–1	Hà Nội T&T	Long An Stadium, Tân An
17:00	Thanh Hải 50'; Gilson Campos 78'	Report	Văn Hiếu 17'	Attendance: 3,000; Referee: Hoàng Phạm Công Khanh

== Semi-finals ==
7 August 2013	Đồng Nai	4–4 (4–3 p)	SHB Đà Nẵng	Biên Hòa Stadium
16:00	Henry 33', 45', 72'; Đình Hiệp 83'	Report	Merlo 60', 78'; Hoàng Quảng 74'; Minh Tuấn 90'	Attendance: 4,000; Referee: Nguyễn Văn Kiên
	Penalties
	Henry (penalty missed); Hữu Thắng (penalty scored); Vũ An (penalty scored); Khánh Thành (penalty scored); Văn Thành (penalty missed)		(penalty scored) Minh Phương; (penalty scored) Hoàng Quảng; (penalty scored) Minh Tâm; (penalty missed) Nguyên Sa; (penalty scored) Cao Cường

7 August 2013	Đồng Tâm Long An	3–3 (3–4 p)	XM The Vissai Ninh Bình	Long An Stadium, Tân An
17:00	Gilson Campos 22' (pen.), 70' (pen.); Việt Thắng 90+4'	Report	Văn Quyến 20'; Omoduemuke 46'; Sanogo 83'	Attendance: 4,000; Referee: Nguyễn Quốc Hùng
	Penalties
	Gilson Campos (penalty missed); Kanu (penalty scored); Việt Thắng (penalty scored); Thanh Hải (penalty missed); Đình Vinh (penalty scored)		(penalty scored) Sanogo; (penalty scored) Quốc Cường; (penalty missed) Gia Từ; (penalty scored) TBD; (penalty scored) TBD

== Final ==
5 September 2013	SHB Đà Nẵng	1–1 (5–6 p)	XM The Vissai Ninh Bình	Chi Lăng Stadium
16:00
