= 2011 Vietnamese Cup =

Tournament details
- Country: Vietnam

Final positions
- Champions: Navibank Sài Gòn
- Runners-up: Sông Lam Nghệ An

The 2011 Vietnamese Cup was the 19th edition of the Vietnamese National Cup. It started on 8 January 2011 and finished on 27 August 2011.

The cup winner were guaranteed a place in the 2012 AFC Cup.

== First round ==
8 January 2011	Đồng Nai Berjaya	0–3	Hòa Phát Hà Nội	Biên Hòa Stadium
15:00		Report	Anjembe 8', 14'; Olumuyiwa 63'	Attendance: 1,200; Referee: Trần Công Trọng

9 January 2011	Than Quảng Ninh	1–1 (3–2 p)	Hà Nội ACB	Cửa Ông Stadium, Cẩm Phả
15:00	Hải Huy 63'	Report	Tuấn Anh 8'	Attendance: 400; Referee: Trần Trung Hiếu
	Penalties
	TBD		TBD

9 January 2011	Hùng Vương An Giang	0–0 (4–5 p)	Vissai Ninh Bình	An Giang Stadium
15:30		Report		Attendance: 3,000; Referee: Nguyễn Quốc Hùng
	Penalties
	TBD		TBD

9 January 2011	SQC Bình Định	1–0	Vicem Hải Phòng	Quy Nhơn Stadium
15:30	Ajuko 63'	Report		Attendance: 1,500; Referee: Nguyễn Văn Kiên

9 January 2011	Huda Huế	2–2 (2–3 p)	Navibank Sài Gon	Tự Do Stadium
15:30	Gajic 11'; Alejandro 20'	Report	Emidio 12'; Endene 34'	Attendance: 1,000; Referee: Nguyễn Trọng Thư
	Penalties
	TBD		TBD

9 January 2011	BHTS Quảng Nam	3–1	XSKT Cần Thơ	Quảng Nam Stadium
15:30	Barbosa 36'; Trung Sơn 56'; Thanh Thế 88'	Report	Đình Vinh 53'	Attendance: 1,000; Referee: Kiều Việt Hùng

9 January 2011	TĐCS Đồng Tháp	1–2	Sài Gòn Xuân Thành	Cao Lãnh Stadium
15:30	Văn Nghĩa 60'	Report	Đình Luật 51'; Kesley Alves 88'	Attendance: 6,000; Referee: Đinh Văn Dũng

9 January 2011	Kienlongbank Kiên Giang	1–2	Đồng Tâm Long An	Rạch Giá Stadium
15:30	Oseni 51'	Report	Lê Tostao 77'; Antonio Carlos 90'	Attendance: 3,000; Referee: Nguyễn Hiền Triết

9 January 2011	Khatoco Khánh Hòa	2–0	XM Fico Tây Ninh	Nha Trang Stadium
16:00	Mạnh Tú 58'; Đình Việt 65'	Report		Attendance: 3,000; Referee: Nguyễn Đức Vũ

9 January 2011	Lam Sơn Thanh Hóa	2–0	Thành phố Hồ Chí Minh	Thanh Hóa Stadium
16:00	Omar Faye 57'; Đình Tùng 88'	Report		Attendance: 3,000; Referee: Đinh Hải Dương

Byes: Bình Dương, Đà Nẵng, Hà Nội T&T, Hoàng Anh Gia Lai, Nam Định, Sông Lam Nghệ An

== Second round ==
15 January 2011	Than Quảng Ninh	1–2	Khatoco Khánh Hòa	Cửa Ông Stadium, Cẩm Phả
15:00	Eduardo 23'	Report	Trindade 47'; Agostinho 57'; Văn Hoán (red card) 74'	Attendance: 300; Referee: Đỗ Quốc Hoài

15 January 2011	Nam Định	1–3	Vissai Ninh Bình	Thiên Trường Stadium
15:30	Văn Tuân 70'	Report	Tuấn Anh 22'; Tiến Thành 75'; Hoàng Max 83'	Attendance: 500; Referee: Kiều Việt Hùng

15 January 2011	SQC Bình Định	1–2	Becamex Bình Dương	Quy Nhơn Stadium
15:30	Phương Thời 30'; Ajuko (red card) 88'	Report	Leandro 7'; Vũ Phong 17'	Attendance: 3,500; Referee: Hoàng Anh Tuấn

15 January 2011	Lam Sơn Thanh Hóa	3–3 (4–2 p)	SHB Đà Nẵng	Thanh Hóa Stadium
16:00	Faye 1', 74'; Đình Tùng 21'	Report	Merlo 17', 53'; Minh Phương 34'	Attendance: 3,000; Referee: Vũ Bảo Linh
	Penalties
	TBD		TBD

15 January 2011	Navibank Sài Gòn	2–0	Hà Nội T&T	Thống Nhất Stadium
17:00	Endene 10', 67'; Duy Khánh (yellow card) 14' (yellow-red card) 54'	Report	Roland (red card) 76'	Attendance: 300; Referee: Nguyễn Văn Quyết

15 January 2011	Sông Lam Nghệ An	2–1	BHTS Quảng Nam	Vinh Stadium
17:00	Quốc Tuấn 7'; Trọng Hoàng 89'	Report	Carlos 35'	Attendance: 500; Referee: Nguyễn Ngọc Châu

16 January 2011	Hòa Phát Hà Nội	0–0 (3–4 p)	Hoàng Anh Gia Lai	Hàng Đẫy Stadium
16:00		Report		Attendance: 1,500; Referee: Võ Minh Trí
	Penalties
	TBD		TBD

16 January 2011	Sài Gòn Xuân Thành	2–0	Đồng Tâm Long An	Thống Nhất Stadium
17:00	Kesley Alves 80'; Hải Anh 89'	Report		Attendance: 3,000; Referee: Đào Văn Cường

== Quarterfinals ==
12 February 2011	Vissai Ninh Bình	1–1 (1–3 p)	Lam Sơn Thanh Hóa	Ninh Bình Stadium
16:00	Hoàng Max 50'	Report	Quang Vinh 57'	Attendance: 3,000; Referee: Phùng Đình Dũng
	Penalties
	TBD		TBD

12 February 2011	Khatoco Khánh Hòa	1–3	Hoàng Anh Gia Lai	Nha Trang Stadium
16:00	Mạnh Tú 43'; Tấn Tài (red card) 45+9'	Report	Tăng Tuấn 2', 30'; Văn Trương 19'; Văn Nhiên (yellow card) 16' (yellow-red card) 90'	Attendance: 3,000; Referee: Ngô Quốc Hưng

12 February 2011	Becamex Bình Dương	1–1 (9–10 p)	Navibank Sài Gòn	Gò Đậu Stadium
17:00	Philani 26'	Report	Endene 66'	Attendance: 10,000; Referee: Trần Công Trọng
	Penalties
	TBD		TBD

12 February 2011	Sông Lam Nghệ An	4–2	Sài Gòn Xuân Thành	Vinh Stadium
17:00	Đình Luật 13'; Thierry 62'; Quang Tình 66'; Bryan 68'	Report	Kesley Alves 11'; Duy Quang 18'; Trọng Bình (yellow card) 48' (yellow-red card) 90'	Attendance: 5,000; Referee: Đỗ Quốc Hoài

== Semifinals ==
10 August 2011	Lam Sơn Thanh Hóa	2–2 (3–5 p)	Navibank Sài Gòn	Thanh Hóa Stadium
17:00	Văn Thắng 6'; Faye 44'	Report	Endene 3', 30'	Attendance: 5,000; Referee: Hoàng Anh Tuấn
	Penalties
	TBD		TBD

10 August 2011	Sông Lam Nghệ An	2–1	Hoàng Anh Gia Lai	Vinh Stadium
17:00	Trọng Hoàng 65'; Hồng Việt 93'	Report	Việt Cường 88'	Attendance: 9,000; Referee: Nguyễn Trọng Thư

== Final ==
27 August 2011
15:30 ICT

Navibank Sài Gòn	3–0	Sông Lam Nghệ An
Nguyễn Quang Hải 37'; Cao Quang Hướng 42', 54'	Report (in Vietnamese)

Thống Nhất Stadium, Ho Chi Minh City
Attendance: 15,000
Referee: Võ Quang Vinh
