= Ngân Văn Đại =

Vietnamese footballer

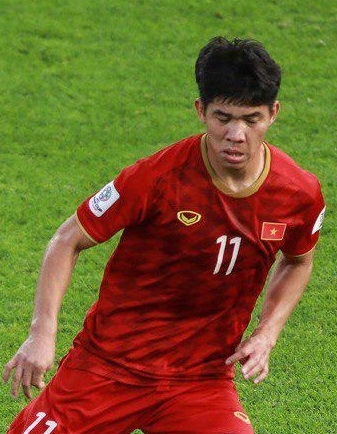
- Ngân Văn Đại with Vietnam national football team at 2019 AFC Asian Cup

Personal information
- Full name: Ngân Văn Đại
- Date of birth: 9 February 1992 (age 34)
- Place of birth: Tương Dương, Nghệ An, Vietnam
- Height: 1.73 m (5 ft 8 in)
- Position: Winger

Team information
- Current team: Bắc Ninh
- Number: 29

Youth career
- 2006–2012: Hà Nội T&T
- 2012: → Sông Lam Nghệ An (loan)

Senior career*
Years	Team	Apps	(Gls)
2011	→ T&T Baoercheng (loan)		
2013–2018	Sài Gòn	26	(6)
2018–2021	Hà Nội	53	(10)
2022–2025	Quảng Nam	57	(8)
2025–	Bắc Ninh	14	(2)

International career^{‡}
2017–2019	Vietnam	2	(0)
- * Club domestic league appearances and goals as of 12 September 2026 ‡ National team caps and goals as of 19 January 2019

Ngân Văn Đại (born 9 February 1992) is a Vietnamese professional footballer who plays as a winger for V.League 1 club Bắc Ninh.

== Club career ==
=== Youth ===
In 2010, after former footballer Văn Sỹ Hùng and Hà Nội T&T's CEO Đỗ Quang Hiển founded the Hà Nội T&T Academy, Đại was one of the first players ever recruited there.

Văn Đại played for the Hà Nội T&T Reserve team before being loaned to T&T Baoercheng FC in 2011 and U21 Sông Lam Nghệ An in 2012. With U21 Sông Lam Nghệ An, he won the 2012 National U-21 Football Championship.

At the 2014 National U-21 Football Championship, Văn Đại contributed 3 goals for U21 Hà Nội T&T, helping the team advance to the final, where they lost against his former team U21 Sông Lam Nghệ An. Văn Đại was a part of the Best XI in this tournament.

== International career ==
=== U-23 Vietnam ===
In September 2013, Văn Đại was called up by coach Hoàng Văn Phúc to the Vietnam U-23 team. However, in December, he was one of 3 players to get eliminate in the list of 22 players for 27th SEA Games.

In September 2014, under coach Toshiya Miura, he was once again called up to the Vietnam U23 team for the 2014 Asian Games.

=== Vietnam national team ===
In September 2017, Văn Đại was called up to the Vietnam national team for the first time by coach Mai Đức Chung.

He was called up to participate in the 2019 AFC Asian Cup by coach Park Hang-seo.

== Honours ==
Sài Gòn

- V.League 2: 2015

Hà Nội

- V.League 1: 2018, 2019; Runner-up: 2020
- Vietnamese National Cup: 2019, 2020
- Vietnamese Super Cup: 2019, 2020, 2021

Quảng Nam

- V.League 2: 2023
