= Marc Lütolf =

Swiss footballer (born 1987)

Personal information
- Full name: Marc Lütolf
- Date of birth: 24 June 1987 (age 39)
- Height: 1.81 m (5 ft 11 in)
- Position: Defender

Senior career*
Years	Team	Apps	(Gls)
2004–2008	Grasshopper	4	(0)
2006–2008	→ Grasshopper II	29	(0)
2008–2010	Gossau	52	(1)
2010	Widnau	?	(?)
Total		85	(1)

International career
2007	Switzerland U20	4	(0)
- * Club domestic league appearances and goals

Marc Lütolf (born 24 June 1987) is a former Swiss footballer.

In February 2008 he joined Gossau. He was released in February 2010.

In May 2010, Lütolf and former teammate Darko Damjanović, Mario Bigoni were given open-ended suspensions after involved in the 2009 European football betting scandal.

Her played for Swiss U20 team at 2006–07 and 2007–08 Four Nations Tournament.
