= François Endene =

Cameroonian footballer (born 1978)

Personal information
- Full name: François Herbert Endene Elokan
- Date of birth: 20 October 1978 (age 48)
- Place of birth: Yaoundé, Cameroon
- Height: 1.85 m (6 ft 1 in)
- Position: Forward

Senior career*
Years	Team	Apps	(Gls)
1995–1998	CD Cachorros de la UdeG		
1998–1999	Jaguares de Colima		
1999–2001	La Piedad		
2001	Atlético Yucatán		
2001–2003	Raja Casablanca		
2004	Chengdu Wuniu	14	(4)
2004–2005	Podbeskidzie Bielsko-Biała	14	(3)
2005–2006	Pogoń Szczecin	15	(2)
2006	→ ŁKS Łódź (loan)	0	(0)
2006–2008	Besa Kavajë	43	(12)
2008	→ Thể Công FC (loan)		
2009–2010	T&T Hà Nội		
2010	Hòa Phát FC		
2011	Navibank Saigon	23	(8)
2011–2012	Cần Thơ FC		
2015–2016	Club Italia-AdW	5	(4)
- * Club domestic league appearances and goals

François Herbert Endene Elokan (born 20 October 1978) is a Cameroonian former professional footballer who played as a forward.

== Club career ==
He previously played for Raja Casablanca, Chengdu, Podbeskidzie Bielsko-Biała, Pogoń Szczecin, ŁKS Łódź, Besa Kavajë and Thể Công FC. He joined T&T Hà Nội, Vietnam in 2009.

== Private life ==
He also holds a Mexican passport.

== Honours ==
Raja Casablanca

- CAF Cup: 2003

Besa Kavajë

- Albanian Cup: 2006–07

Navibank Saigon

- Vietnamese Cup: 2011
