= Phan Lưu Thế Sơn =

Vietnamese footballer (born 1991)

Thế Sơn
Personal information
- Full name: Phan Lưu Thế Sơn
- Date of birth: 20 November 1991 (age 34)
- Place of birth: Bình Thuận, Vietnam
- Position: Defender

Youth career
- Hô Chí Minh City Police
- –2010: T&T Hà Nội

Senior career*
| Years | Team | Apps | (Gls) |
| 2010–2011 | V&V United | | |
| 2011–2013 | Xuân Thành Sài Gòn | | |
| 2014 | Đồng Nai | | |

International career
| 2010 | Vietnam U-19 | | |
- * Club domestic league appearances and goals

Phan Lưu Thế Sơn (born 20 November 1991) is a former Vietnamese footballer who played as a defender.

== Youth career ==
Born in Bình Thuận, Sơn moved to Ho Chi Minh City and began his youth career at the Hô Chí Minh City Police academy and later transferred to T&T Hà Nội's youth team. After a scandal involving the Vietnam under-19 national team in 2010, Sơn was released by his club.

== Club career ==
In 2010, Thế Sơn joined V&V United.

After being promoted to the First League with V&V, Sơn signed for Xuân Thành Sài Gòn and only played for 2 years before the club disbanded in 2013.

At the beginning of the 2014 season, Sơn signed a two-year contract with Đồng Nai. On 20 July 2014, before the match against Quảng Nam FC on Cẩm Phả Stadium, many defenders were either suspension or injured, because Sơn had not started any game and even substituted in very rarely so coach Trần Bình Sự put him to the starting lineup, along with defender Nguyễn Thành Long Giang. However, it was his first match for the team and also his last match, as he and five other players were accused of betting and match-fixing. The team didn't apply for expungement of their conviction and released all players. After one year of investigation, Sơn was proved innocent with the reason given that he did not participate in the case, the permanent suspension was lifted.

== International career ==
In 2010, Thế Sơn was called up by coach Triệu Quang Hà to play for Vietnam's under-19 national team for the U-21 Thanh Niên Newspaper Cup. During the match between Vietnam and Singapore's under-21 at Thống Nhất Stadium, in the 37th minute, from a distance of about 40m, Sơn turned behind and suddenly made a lob pass to the goal while goalkeeper Trần Anh Đức was going to attack, which led to an own goal. The coach then substituted him out. In the end of the match, Vietnam won 2–1, Triệu Quang Hà told the press in the conference room that it was simply a mistake of the young player, but concerns of match-fixing still raised.

== Honours ==
=== Xuân Thành Sài Gòn ===
- V.League 2: 2011
