= 2005 V-League =

V-League
- Season: 2005
- Dates: 30 January – 11 August
- Champions: Đồng Tâm Long An
- Relegated: Đồng Tháp
- AFC Champions League: Đồng Tâm Long An; Đà Nẵng
- Matches: 132
- Goals: 340 (2.58 per match)
- Top goalscorer: Kesley Alves (21 goals)

The 2005 V-League, also known as the 2005 Number One V-League (Vietnamese: Giải bóng đá Vô địch Quốc gia Number One 2005) for sponsorship reasons, was the 22nd season of the V.League 1, the top Vietnamese professional league for association football clubs, since its establishment in 1980.

Đồng Tâm Long An won their first title in this season, displacing two-time champions Hoàng Anh Gia Lai.

== Changes from the previous season ==
There were two teams relegated last season to the 2005 Vietnamese First League. Thể Công and Ngân hàng Đông Á Thép Pomina, were relegated due to them finishing 11th and 12th respectively the previous season.

Two teams were promoted from the 2004 Vietnamese First League: Cảng Sài Gòn, who won the title and returned to V-League after a one-year absence, and Hòa Phát Hà Nội, who finished second, playing in the V-League for the first time.

== Participating clubs ==
Club	Location	Stadium	Capacity
Bình Dương	Thủ Dầu Một, Bình Dương	Gò Đậu	25,000
Bình Định	Quy Nhơn, Bình Định	Quy Nhơn	20,000
Delta Đồng Tháp	Cao Lãnh, Đồng Tháp	Cao Lãnh	20,000
Đà Nẵng	Hải Châu, Đà Nẵng	Chi Lăng	30,000
Gạch Đồng Tâm Long An	Tân An, Long An	Long An	20,000
Hoàng Anh Gia Lai	Pleiku, Gia Lai	Pleiku	15,000
LG Hà Nội ACB	Đống Đa, Hà Nội	Hàng Đẫy	25,000
Thép Miền Nam - Cảng Sài Gòn	District 10, Ho Chi Minh City	Thống Nhất	22,000
Sông Đà Nam Định	Nam Định	Thiên Trường	30,000
Sông Lam Nghệ An	Vinh, Nghệ An	Vinh	20,000
Thép Việt Úc Hải Phòng	Ngô Quyền, Hải Phòng	Lạch Tray	30,000
Hòa Phát Hà Nội	Đống Đa, Hà Nội	Hàng Đẫy	25,000

== League table ==
Pos	Team	Pld	W	D	L	GF	GA	GD	Pts	Qualification or relegation
1	Gạch Đồng Tâm Long An (C)	22	12	6	4	43	25	+18	42	Qualification for the AFC Champions League league stage
2	Đà Nẵng	22	10	8	4	33	19	+14	38	Qualification for the AFC Champions League league stage
3	Bình Dương	22	11	5	6	40	32	+8	38	
4	Hoàng Anh Gia Lai	22	9	5	8	30	24	+6	32	
5	Sông Lam Nghệ An	22	8	7	7	33	28	+5	31	
6	Sông Đà Nam Định	22	7	7	8	27	31	−4	28	
7	Misustar Hải Phòng	22	6	9	7	31	34	−3	27	
8	Thép Miền Nam Cảng Sài Gòn	22	6	9	7	26	30	−4	27	
9	Bình Định	22	5	10	7	17	21	−4	25	
10	Hòa Phát Hà Nội	22	6	7	9	24	29	−5	25	
11	LG Hà Nội ACB	22	5	9	8	18	27	−9	24	Promotion/Relegation Playoff
12	Đồng Tháp (R)	22	3	6	13	18	40	−22	15	Relegation to the Vietnamese First League

Source: VFF
Rules for classification: 1) Points; 2) Goal difference; 3) Goals scored; 4) Head-to-head points; 5) Head-to-head goal difference; 6) Head-to-head goals scored; 7) Fewer disciplinary points.
(C) Champions; (R) Relegated

== Top scorers ==
Rank	Player	Club	Goals
1	(Brazil) Kesley Alves	Becamex Bình Dương	21
2	(Brazil) Carlos Henrique	Gạch Đồng Tâm Long An	13
3	(Brazil) Jucelio Batista	Hòa Phát Hà Nội	11
4	(Nigeria) Amaobi Uzowuru	Đà Nẵng	10
5	(Vietnam) Hoàng Ngọc Linh	Sông Đà Nam Định	9
