= 1992 Vietnamese Cup =

Tournament details
- Country: Vietnam
- Dates: 29 March – 14 May
- Teams: 18

Final positions
- Champions: Cảng Sài Gòn (1st title)
- Runners-up: Quân Đội
- Third place: Đường sắt Việt Nam; Lâm Đồng

Tournament statistics
- Matches played: 2
- Goals scored: 5 (2.5 per match)

The 1992 Vietnamese Cup (Vietnamese: Giải bóng đá Cúp Quốc gia 1992) is the first staging of the Vietnamese Cup. Eighteen member clubs entered this tournament. In the final, Cảng Sài Gòn defeated Quân Đội 5–4 penalties under 1–1 draw to take their first ever title on this cup competition.

== Final ==
14 May 1992
16:00

Cảng Sài Gòn	1–1	Quân Đội
Goal		Goal
Penalties
	5–4

Thống Nhất Stadium, Ho Chi Minh City
