= 2008 Vietnamese Cup =

Tournament details
- Country: Vietnam
- Dates: 29 December 2007 – 30 August 2008
- Teams: 27

Final positions
- Champions: Ha Noi ACB
- Runners-up: Becamex Binh Duong FC

Tournament statistics
- Matches played: 26
- Goals scored: 75 (2.88 per match)
- All statistics correct as of 19 April 2021.

The 2008 Vietnamese Cup (known as the Bamboo Airways National Cup for sponsorship reasons) season was the 16th edition of the Vietnamese National Cup, the football knockout tournament of Vietnam organized by the Vietnam Football Federation.

== Pre-classified ==
Five teams had an automatic qualification bye in the first round for the round of 16.

- Becamex Binh Duong FC
- Binh Dinh FC
- HP. Ha Noi
- Nam Dinh Football Club
- Thanh Hoa FC

== First round ==
Dec 29 1	Than Quang Ninh FC	4-0	Huda Hue F.C.	Vietnam
		Report

Dec 29 1	Viettel FC (The Cong)	0-0*	T&T Ha Noi	Vietnam
		Report
Note: *[5-4 pen]

Dec 29 1	XM. Hai Phong	2-0	Quan khu 4	Vietnam
		Report

Dec 29 1	Quan khu 5	0-2	TCDK SLNA	Vietnam
		Report

Dec 29 1	Tay Ninh F.C.	1-1+	Can Tho FC	Vietnam
		Report
Note: *[3-4 pen]

Dec 29 1	SHB Da Nang FC	3-0	An Giang FC	Vietnam
		Report

Dec 29 1	TDCS Dong Thap F.C.	2-0	Hoang Anh Gia Lai FC	Vietnam
		Report

Dec 29 1	TMN. CSG	1-2	Quan khu 7 FC	Vietnam
		Report

Dec 29 1	Tien Giang FC	1-3	Khanh Hoa FC	Vietnam
		Report

Dec 29 1	Long An FC	6-1	Dong Nai FC	Vietnam
		Report

Dec 30 1	Ha Noi ACB	3-1	TNTB.Quang Ngai	Vietnam
		Report

== Round of 16 ==
Feb 15 Round of 16	Nam Dinh Football Club	0-0*	Than Quang Ninh FC	Vietnam
		Report
Note: *[4-2 pen]

Feb 15 Round of 16	Ha Noi.ACB	2-0	Thanh Hoa FC	Vietnam
		Report

Feb 15 Round of 16	Becamex Binh Duong FC	7-1	Can Tho FC	Vietnam
		Report

Feb 15 Round of 16	SHB Da Nang FC	2-0	TDCS Dong Thap F.C.	Vietnam
		Report

Feb 15 Round of 16	Quan khu 7 FC	0-5	Khanh Hoa FC	Vietnam
		Report

Feb 15 Round of 16	Long An FC	0-0*	Becamex Binh Duong FC	Vietnam
		Report
Note: *[3-4 pen]

Feb 16 Round of 16	XM.Hai Phong	3-3*	TCDK SLNA	Vietnam
		Report
Note: *[2-4 pen]

Feb 16 Round of 16	Viettel FC(The Cong)	1-0	HP.Ha Noi	Vietnam
		Report

== Quarter–final round ==
Apr 4 Quarter–final	DPM. Nam Dinh FC	1-1*	Viettel FC (The Cong)	Vietnam
		Report
Note: *[5-4 pen]

Apr 4 Quarter–final	TCDK SLNA	0-0*	Hà Nội ACB	Vietnam
		Report
Note: *[4-5 pen]

Apr 4 Quarter–final	Becamex Binh Duong FC	2-2*	SHB Da Nang FC	Vietnam
		Report
Note: *[5-4 pen]

Jul 15 Quarter–final	Khanh Hoa FC	3-2	Binh Dinh FC	Vietnam
		Report

== Semi-finals ==
Jul 25 Semi-Final	DPM. Nam Dinh FC	1-2	Hà Nội ACB	Vietnam
		Report

Jul 25 Semi-Final	Becamex Binh Duong FC	2-0	Khanh Hoa FC	Vietnam
		Report

== Final ==
Aug 30 Final	Hà Nội ACB	1-0	Becamex Binh Duong FC	Vietnam
	Truong Huynh Diep 2	Report
