= 2009 Vietnamese National Football First League =

V.League 2
- Season: 2009
- Dates: 6 February – 22 August
- Champions: XM Vissai The Ninh Bình
- Runner up: Hòa Phát Hà Nội
- Relegated: Saigon United FC; Quảng Ngãi FC

Vietnamese National Football First League (V.League 2) is the second highest league in Vietnamese football after the V.League 1 with 14 teams competing in it.

Previous Winners

Season	Champions	Runner-up	Third Place
2009	XM Vissai The Ninh Bình	Hòa Phát Hà Nội	Thành phố Cần Thơ

== Standings ==
Pos	Team	Pld	W	D	L	GF	GA	GD	Pts	Promotion or relegation
1	XM Vissai The Ninh Bình	24	16	5	3	36	9	+27	53	Promoted to V-League
2	Hòa Phát Hà Nội	24	12	8	4	37	22	+15	44	Promoted to V-League
3	Thành phố Cần Thơ	24	9	10	5	32	26	+6	37	Promotion Play Off Place Lost
4	Boss Bình Định F.C.	24	11	4	9	39	36	+3	37	
5	Huế F.C.	24	9	7	8	21	16	+5	34	
6	Tây Ninh	24	8	7	9	30	37	−7	31	
7	Quảng Ninh Hạ Long	25	7	9	9	33	30	+3	30	
8	Hà Nội ACB	24	7	8	9	29	35	−6	29	
9	Đồng Nai Biên Hòa	24	7	7	10	26	30	−4	28	
10	Tiền Giang Mỹ Tho	24	8	3	13	26	33	−7	27	
11	An Giang Long Xuyên	24	6	9	9	20	31	−11	27	
12	Quảng Nam FC	24	4	11	9	23	34	−11	23	
13	Saigon United FC	24	6	4	14	19	32	−13	22	Relegated to Vietnam Second Division
14	Quảng Ngãi FC	0	0	0	0	0	0	0	0	Demoted to Vietnam Second Division
