= David Blumer =

Swiss footballer (born 1986)

Personal information
- Date of birth: 28 February 1986 (age 40)
- Height: 1.78 m (5 ft 10 in)
- Position: Forward

Senior career*
Years	Team	Apps	(Gls)
2005–2008	Grasshoppers	27	(2)
2008–2009	Thun	29	(12)
2009–2010	Wil	34	(15)
Total		90	(29)

International career
2006–2008	Switzerland U21	6	(0)
- * Club domestic league appearances and goals

David Blumer (born 26 February 1986) is a Swiss former professional footballer who played as a forward.

== Club career ==
In May 2010, Blumer was banned from football for 24 months, which he was involved in 2009 European football match-fixing scandal. His former teammate Pape Omar Fayé and Eldar Ikanović were also banned.

== International career ==
Blumer made his U21 debut on 15 November 2006, a friendly against Slovenia U21. He played all six caps in friendly match.
