= Mario Bigoni =

Swiss-Italian footballer (1984–2011)

Personal information
- Date of birth: 18 June 1984
- Date of death: 23 October 2011 (aged 27)
- Place of death: Rheineck, Switzerland
- Position: Defensive midfielder

Youth career
- FC St. Gallen

Senior career*
Years	Team	Apps	(Gls)
–2006	FC St. Gallen II		
2006–2009	FC Gossau	70	(1)
2010	FC Sirnach-Stella		

Managerial career
- FC Rheineck (youth coach)
- * Club domestic league appearances and goals

Mario Bigoni was a Swiss-Italian footballer who played as a defensive midfielder.

== Playing career ==
Bigoni started his youth career at FC St. Gallen and played for their reserves in the 1. Liga. In 2006, he moved to FC Gossau, helping them win promotion from the 1. Liga to the Challenge League in his first season. After 70 league matches and one goal for Gossau, he was dismissed on 23 November 2009, due to his involvement in an international match-fixing scandal. In early 2010, he briefly played for FC Sirnach-Stella until he, along with former Gossau teammates Marc Lütolf and Darko Damjanović, were indefinitely suspended by the Swiss Football Association in May 2010. Following this, he returned to his previous profession as a mechanic and became a youth coach at FC Rheineck.

== Betting Scandal ==
The Croatian mafia is alleged to have manipulated several matches of FC Gossau. This became apparent as the club lost numerous consecutive league games against both strong and weak opponents. After the 2008–09 season, Gossau was relegated from the Challenge League to the 1. Liga. At the end of the season, Bigoni stated that a match from the previous season was "not clean" (a 0–4 defeat against FC Locarno on 24 May 2009) and that he received an offer from a teammate to fix the match, allegedly from the first choice goalkeeper, Darko Damjanović. It remained unclear whether he accepted the offer, but he was suspended by FC Gossau and banned by the Swiss Football Association.

== Death ==
Bigoni died under mysterious circumstances. On Saturday, October 8, 2011, he spent the evening with friends at a floating restaurant on the Rhine near Gaissau in Austria. Subsequently, he disappeared without a trace. Allegedly, he was heavily under the influence of alcohol when last seen. He was then declared missing, and several search teams were summoned. His body was found on Sunday, October 23, in the riverbed of the Old Rhine near Rheineck. The discovery location was 1.5 km from the place of his disappearance. The subsequent forensic report found no signs of foul play, suggesting an accident.
