= Heinz Bigler =

Heinz Bigler may refer to:

- Heinz Bigler (footballer, born 1925) (1925–2002), Swiss football midfielder and manager
- Heinz Bigler (footballer, born 1949) (1949–2021), Swiss football defender and manager
