= Hoàng Minh Tâm =

Vietnamese footballer (born 1990)

Personal information
- Full name: Hoàng Minh Tâm
- Date of birth: 28 October 1990 (age 36)
- Place of birth: Sơn Trà, Đà Nẵng, Vietnam
- Height: 1.72 m (5 ft 8 in)
- Position: Central midfielder

Team information
- Current team: SHB Đà Nẵng B
- Number: 12

Youth career
- 2003–2012: SHB Đà Nẵng

Senior career*
Years	Team	Apps	(Gls)
2013–2023	SHB Đà Nẵng	205	(15)
2023–2025	Trường Tươi Bình Phước	20	(1)
2026–	SHB Đà Nẵng B	3	(0)

International career^{‡}
2014–2015	Vietnam	3	(0)
- * Club domestic league appearances and goals as of 14 April 2026 ‡ National team caps and goals as of 2 July 2014

Hoàng Minh Tâm (born 28 October 1990) is a Vietnamese professional footballer who plays as a central midfielder for Second Division club SHB Đà Nẵng B. Between 2014 and 2015, Minh Tâm was a member of the Vietnam national football team.

== Honours ==
SHB Đà Nẵng

- Vietnamese Super Cup: 2012
- V.League 1 runner-up: 2013
- Vietnamese National Cup runner-up: 2013
