= Pape Omar Faye =

Senegalese footballer (born 1987)

Personal information
- Date of birth: 1 January 1987 (age 39)
- Place of birth: Louga, Senegal
- Height: 1.88 m (6 ft 2 in)
- Position: Forward

Youth career
- Compagnie St. Sénégalais

Senior career*
| Years | Team | Apps | (Gls) |
| 2002–2003 | ASSUR | | |
| 2003–2004 | Coton Sport | | |
| 2004–2010 | Thun | 86 | (23) |
| 2006–2007 | → Vaduz (loan) | 33 | (12) |
| 2011–2012 | Dong A Thanh Hoa | 25 | (15) |
| 2014–2015 | ASC Jaraaf | | |
| 2015–2018 | Dong A Thanh Hoa | 79 | (60) |
| 2018–2020 | Hanoi | 39 | (17) |
| 2020–2021 | Becamex Binh Duong | 12 | (0) |
- * Club domestic league appearances and goals as of 2 May 2021

Pape Omar Faye (born 1 January 1987) is a Senegalese professional footballer who plays as a forward.

== Career ==
Faye started his career at Senegal. In 2005–06 he landed in Europe and played for Swiss side FC Thun. In Sept 2005, Faye made his debut in the UEFA Champions League in 87th minute as a substitute for Mauro Lustrinelli in the opening game of the group stage against Arsenal in Arsenal Stadium. He also played in the UEFA Europa League for FC Vaduz. Faye was a member of the 2009 European football betting scandal and was suspended for one game. In the course of the determinations from the 2009 European football match-fixing scandal he was fired without notice on 25 January 2010.

In May 2010, he was given an open-ended suspension. Teammate Eldar Ikanović and former teammate David Blumer were also banned.

In January 2011, he signed a contract with Dong A Thanh Hoa after a short time trial. He made Dong A Thanh Hoa debut in 2011 Vietnamese Cup first round match against Ho Chi Minh City FC and scored a goal in 57th minute. In the second round of 2011 Vietnamese Cup, he scored two goals and helped his team advance to quarterfinals with penalty won over SHB Da Nang.

On 1 May 2011, he scored three goals in a match against Vissai Ninh Binh in Thanh Hóa Stadium helped Dong A Thanh Hoa win 3–1 and moved up to fourth position of 2011 V-League after 13 round. On 8 June, he scored the first away goal under the Dong A Thanh Hoa. jersey in the match his team was drawn with Vissai Ninh Binh in the 18th round of 2011 V-League.

On 10 July 2011, he scored four goals in the match against Becamex Binh Duong and help his team win this match with score 4–1.

In 2012, Dong A Thanh Hoa discovered his ban imposed by the FIFA, so they terminated the contract with him. According to Senegal's media, he was out of ban from football in December 2014 and played for ASC Jaraaf in Senegal during this time.

== Honours ==
Hà Nội FC

- V.League 1: 2019
- Vietnamese Super Cup: 2018
