= Trai =

TRAI (Telecom Regulatory Authority of India) is a statutory body set up by the Government of India.

TRAI or Trai may also refer to:

== People ==
Trai is a given name. It can be a masculine given name which has its root in Middle English, as well as a Thai and Vietnamese name. Notable people with the name include:

- Trai Byers (born 1983), American actor
- Trai Essex (born 1982), American footballer
- Trai Fuller (born 1997), Australian rugby league footballer
- Trai Hume (born 2002), Northern Irish footballer
- Lê Quang Trãi (born 1977), Vietnamese football coach
- Trai Nimtawat (born 2001), Thai actor
- Nguyễn Trãi (1380–1442), Vietnamese Confucian scholar
- Trai Turner (born 1993), American footballer
