= Trần Anh Đức =

Vietnamese footballer

Personal information
- Full name: Trần Anh Đức
- Date of birth: 11 May 1991 (age 35)
- Place of birth: Kim Động, Hưng Yên, Vietnam
- Height: 1.80 m (5 ft 11 in)
- Position: Goalkeeper

Youth career
- 2006–2014: Hà Nội

Senior career*
| Years | Team | Apps | (Gls) |
| 2015–2018 | Hà Nội | 31 | (0) |
| 2019–2022 | Công An Nhân Dân | 37 | (0) |
- * Club domestic league appearances and goals as of 11 February 2017

Trần Anh Đức (born 11 May 1991) is a Vietnamese footballer who plays as a goalkeeper for club Công An Nhân Dân.

== Honours ==
Hà Nội

- V.League 1: 2016, 2018
- Vietnamese National Cup: Runner-up 2015, 2016
- Vietnamese Super Cup: Runners-up 2015, 2016

Công An Nhân Dân

- V.League 2: 2022
