= Ngô Đức Thắng =

Vietnamese footballer

Personal information
- Full name: Ngô Đức Thắng
- Date of birth: May 4, 1988 (age 38)
- Place of birth: Cẩm Xuyên, Hà Tĩnh, Vietnam
- Height: 1.70 m (5 ft 7 in)
- Positions: Midfielder; defender

Youth career
- 2000–2006: Hà Nội ACB

Senior career*
Years	Team	Apps	(Gls)
2007–2011	Hà Nội ACB	21	(3)
2012–2013	Hà Nội	5	(0)
2013–2016	Đồng Nai	51	(5)
2016–2018	Than Quảng Ninh	14	(2)
2018–2022	Quảng Nam	40	(7)
- * Club domestic league appearances and goals as of 18 January 2017

Ngô Đức Thắng (born 4 May 1988) is a Vietnamese footballer who plays as either a midfielder or defenderfor Quảng Nam in the V.League 1.
