= Marcel Schuon =

German footballer

Personal information
- Date of birth: 28 April 1985 (age 41)
- Place of birth: Freudenstadt, West Germany
- Height: 1.83 m (6 ft 0 in)
- Positions: Centre-back; defensive midfielder

Youth career
- ?–1995: TSV Haiterbach
- 1995–2003: VfB Stuttgart

Senior career*
Years	Team	Apps	(Gls)
2003–2004	VfB Stuttgart II	85	(3)
2004–2007	VfB Stuttgart	0	(0)
2007–2009	VfL Osnabrück	57	(3)
2009	SV Sandhausen	13	(1)
Total		155	(7)
- * Club domestic league appearances and goals

Marcel Schuon (born 28 April 1985) is a German former professional footballer who played as a centre-back or defensive midfielder.

== Involvement in match-fixing scandal ==
Schuon was involved in the 2009 European football match-fixing scandal and claimed at the law public prosecution department Bochum, only few hours after admitting his involvement he was sacked by SV Sandhausen.
