= 1999–2000 Vietnamese Cup =

Tournament details
- Country: Vietnam
- Dates: 2 November 1999 – 27 May 2000

Final positions
- Champions: Cảng Sài Gòn (2nd title)
- Runners-up: Công an TPHCM

The 1999–2000 Vietnamese Cup was the 8th edition of the Vietnamese National Cup. All matches were hold in Hồ Chí Minh City.

== Preliminary round ==
[Nov 2 and Nov 6]

Team	Agg	Team	1st leg	2nd leg
Quảng Ngãi	3-3	Đắk Lắk	3-2	0-1
Bình Thuận	1-2	Trà Vinh	1-0	0-2

[following rounds apparently part of group stage]

== Round 1 ==
[Nov 13-14]

Team	Score	Team
Bình Định	ppd	Đường sắt Việt Nam
Cần Thơ	1-1	Bình Dương
Đắk Lắk	2–3	Công an Hải Phòng
Kon Tum	2–1	Huế
Quảng Nam	1–3	Sông Lam Nghệ An
Quảng Ninh	1-1	Nam Định
Đà Nẵng	0–1	Quân khu 3
Gia Lai	2–1	Thể Công
Tiền Giang	1–2	Cảng Sài Gòn
Hải Quan	1-1	Đồng Tháp
Lâm Đồng	2–0	Quân khu 9
An Giang	1–0	Khánh Hòa
Đồng Nai	1–2	Long An
Quân khu 7	0–2	Vĩnh Long
Trà Vinh	1–5	Công an TPHCM

== Round 2 ==
[Dec 22]

Team	Score	Team
Kon Tum	0-1	Quân khu 3
Gia Lai	1-1	Quảng Ninh
Đắk Lắk	0-0	Đường sắt Việt Nam
Đồng Nai	1-2	Bình Dương
Trà Vinh	0-0	Quân khu 9
An Giang	1-0	Cần Thơ
Quân khu 7	1-2	Tiền Giang
Bình Thuận	0-2	Hải Quan

[NB: Cong An = Police; Quan Khu = Military Zone; Duong Sat = Railways SC]

== 1/16 Finals ==
[Feb ? and Mar 4,5]

Team	Agg	Team	1st leg	2nd leg
Bưu Điện	0-1	Công an Hà Nội	0-0	0-1
Kon Tum	3-3	Huế	2-1	1-3
Tiền Giang	3-5	Cảng Sài Gòn	1-2	2-3
An Giang	3-0	Khánh Hòa	1-0	2-0
Gia Lai	2-3	Thể Công	2-1	0-2
Đắk Lắk	2-8	Công an Hải Phòng	2-3	0-5
Quảng Nam	2-6	Sông Lam Nghệ An	1-3	1-3
Quảng Ninh	2-4	Nam Định	1-1	1-3
Quân khu 3	3-0	Đà Nẵng	1-0	2-0
Trà Vinh	1-8	Công an TP HCM	1-5	0-3
Vĩnh Long	3-2	Quân khu 7	2-0	1-2
Đồng Nai	3-4	Long An	1-2	2-2
Lâm Đồng	3-2	Quân khu 9	2-0	1-2
Hải Quan	1-2	Đồng Tháp	1-1	0-1

== 1/8 Finals ==
Team	Agg	Team	1st leg	2nd leg
Công an Hải Phòng	3-5	Công an Hà Nội	1-2	2-3
Sông Lam Nghệ An	4-2	Huế	2-0	2-2
Quân khu 3	0-3	Nam Định	0-0	0-3
Thể Công	6-1	Đường sắt Việt Nam	3-1	3-0
Bình Dương	2-7	Cảng Sài Gòn	0-0	2-7
Lâm Đồng	1-2	Đồng Tháp	1-0	0-2
Khánh Hòa	1-3	Long An	0-1	1-2
Công an TPHCM	awd	Vĩnh Long^{1}		

^1Vĩnh Long withdrew from league and cup

== Quarterfinals ==
[May 14 and 19]

Cong An HCMC 3-1 2-2 Cong An Hanoi

[May 15 and 19]

SLNA 2-3 3-3 Long An

[May 15 and 20]

Nam Định 1-1 0-3 Đồng Tháp

[May 17 and 20]

Cang Saigon 1-0 3-0 The Cong

== Semifinals ==
23 May 2000	Long An	0–3	Công an TP Hồ Chí Minh	Tân An Stadium, Long An
16:00

24 May 2000	Cảng Sài Gòn	1–0	Đồng Tháp	Thống Nhất Stadium, Ho Chi Minh City
16:00

== Final ==
27 May 2000	Cảng Sài Gòn	2–1	Công an TP Hồ Chí Minh	Thống Nhất Stadium, Ho Chi Minh City
16:00	Hứa Hiền Vinh; Hồ Văn Lợi		Hoàng Hùng
