= Nguyễn Tài Lộc (footballer, born 1989) =

Vietnamese footballer (born 1989)

Personal information
- Full name: Nguyễn Tài Lộc
- Date of birth: 26 December 1989 (age 36)
- Place of birth: Tân Thạnh, Long An, Vietnam
- Height: 1.71 m (5 ft 7 in)
- Position: Attacking midfielder

Team information
- Current team: Long An
- Number: 19

Youth career
- 2006–2013: Long An

Senior career*
Years	Team	Apps	(Gls)
2014–2019	Long An	85	(12)
2020–2022	SHB Đà Nẵng	26	(0)
2023–2024	Long An	30	(4)
2024–2025	Trường Tươi Bình Phước	19	(0)
2025–	Long An	16	(1)
- * Club domestic league appearances and goals as of 6 June 2026

Nguyễn Tài Lộc (born 16 December 1989) is a Vietnamese professional footballer who plays as an attacking midfielder for V.League 2 club Long An.
