= FC Gossau =

Association football club

- Full name: Fussballclub Gossau
- Founded: 1906; 120 years ago
- Ground: Sportanlage Buechenwald; Gossau
- Capacity: 3,500
- Chairman: Carlo Troisi
- Manager: Giuliano Tobler
- League: 2. Liga Interregional
- 2024–25: Group 4, 4th of 16
Home colours	Away colours

FC Gossau is a Swiss football club from the city of Gossau, canton of St. Gallen. The team currently plays in 2. Liga Interregional, the fifth tier of Swiss football.

== History ==
After its foundation in 1906, FC Gossau spent the first 65 years of its history in almost entire unimportance. This changed in 1971 when they advanced for the first time to the 1. Liga (third level) by a 3–0 victory against FC Widnau. Between 1975 and 1978, they even managed to reach the promotion to the second level (NLB). Changeful years followed, the Club played mostly in the 1. or 2. Liga.

After another relegation to the 2. Liga in 1987, Roger Heri composed a new team and induced the "second bloom" for FC Gossau in the nineties. In 1992, they achieved the promotion to the 1. Liga, after victories against FC Solothurn and FC Monthey they even got to the second level in 1993. Despite seven clubs being relegated, they managed to remain in the NLB because they defeated FC Chiasso in the play-offs. However, in the following season they failed to avoid relegation. Under the management of Heinz Bigler, the team defeated Ascona and AC Bellinzona in the play-offs and made it to reascend to NLB.

However, the last second-level membership of FC Gossau so far (season 1996/97) lasted merely one season. While heading the table after the fifth matchday, the team afterwards fell back to the second-last place until winter break. Neither a change of manager nor the engagement of several new players could prevent their relegation. Thereafter, FC Gossau played with changing successes in the 1. Liga until 2006/2007 when they managed to reach the promotion again.

The club hit the headlines when they defeated the favourite FC St. Gallen in the Swiss Cup by 2–0 in 2007.

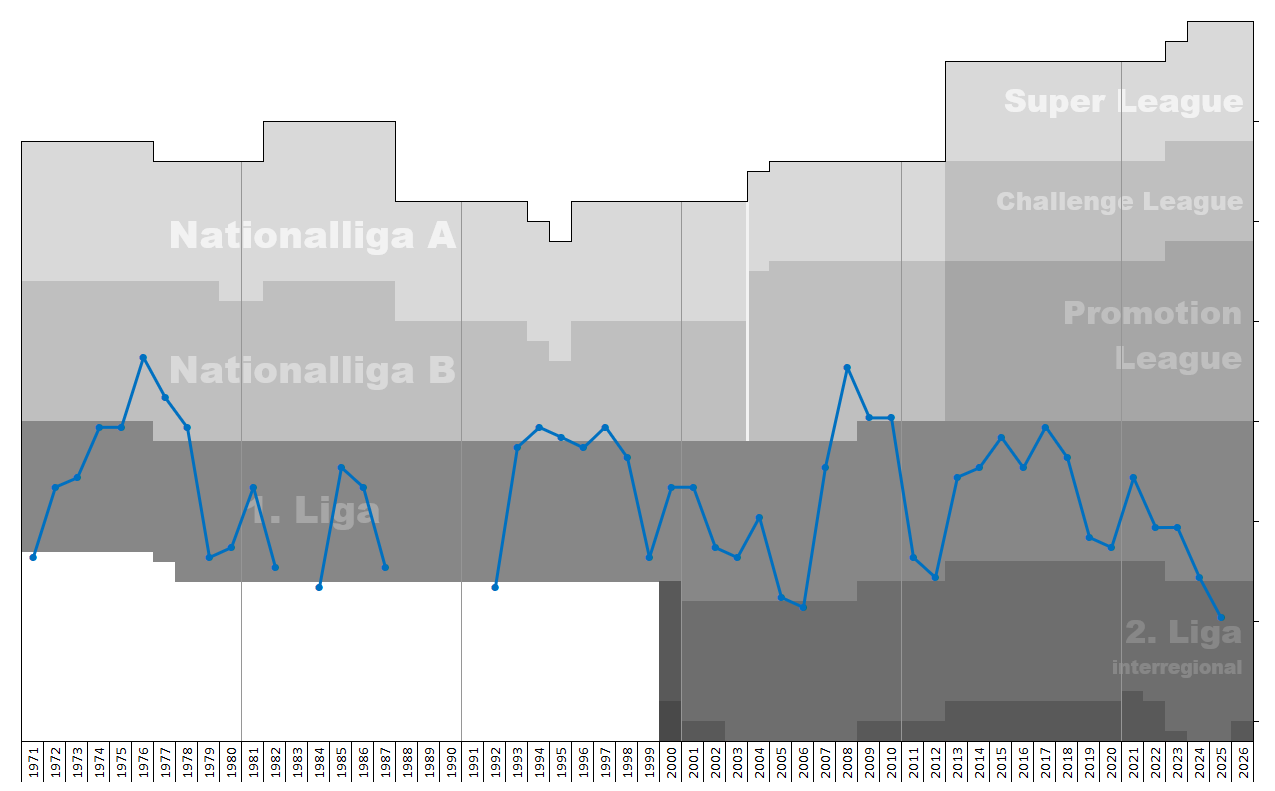
Chart of FC Gossau table positions in the Swiss football league system

According to rumors, the club faces allegations of being involved in match-fixing during season 2008/09. Sources believe that a former goalkeeper and a defender, still member of the squad, were bribed by a betting gang. Mario Bigoni was released on 23 November 2009 in the course of the 2009 European football betting scandal.

In May 2010, former players Marc Lütolf, Mario Bigoni, and Darko Damjanović were given open-ended suspensions.

== Former coaches ==
- Vlado Nogic (2005–2009)
- Hans Kodric (2009)

== Current squad ==
As of 2 November 2021. Note: Flags indicate national team as defined under FIFA eligibility rules; some limited exceptions apply. Players may hold more than one non-FIFA nationality.

No.	Pos.	Nation	Player
1	GK	SUI	Daniel Geisser
3	DF	SUI	Janik Eugster
4	DF	SUI	Filip Degen
5	DF	GER	Gil Lange
6	MF	SUI	Kristian Karrica
7	FW	SUI	Sven Lehmann
8	MF	SUI	Manuel Baumann
10	FW	SUI	Nico Abegglen (captain)
11	MF	SUI	Gabriel Makia
13	MF	SUI	Geronimo Casadio
14	MF	SUI	Silvano Schäppi
15	DF	SUI	Rikard Oroshi

No.	Pos.	Nation	Player
16	MF	SUI	Luca Altherr
17	MF	SUI	Yannick Stacher
18	FW	SUI	Arian Vujic
19	DF	SUI	Marco Franin
20	DF	SUI	Yannik Grin
21	DF	SUI	Quoc Trung Nguyen
23	DF	SUI	Loris Pellegatta
27	MF	SUI	Lulzim Salija
32	GK	SUI	Claudio Bernet
80	MF	SUI	Devin Baumann
99	GK	SUI	Fabio Wirth
