= 2009 European football match-fixing scandal =

European sports scandal

"UEFA will be demanding the harshest of sanctions before the competent courts for any individuals, clubs or officials who are implicated in this malpractice, be it under state or sports jurisdiction."

— UEFA General Secretary Gianni Infantino, 20 November 2009.

The 2009 European football betting scandal was an attempt to influence the outcome of professional association football matches in Europe, and to defraud the gambling industry by betting on the results. The investigation centres on around 200 fixtures, including domestic league games in nine European countries: Germany, Belgium, Switzerland, Croatia, Slovenia, Turkey, Hungary, Bosnia-Herzegovina and Austria. It also involved twelve qualifying matches in the UEFA Europa League and three in the UEFA Champions League. Peter Limacher, a spokesman for European football's governing body UEFA, described it as "the biggest match-fixing scandal ever to hit Europe."

== Background ==
"If results are fixed in advance, football has no further reason to exist."

— Michel Platini.

The 2009 European football betting scandal was considered to be the biggest affair in European football since the 2005 football scandal of referee Robert Hoyzer and the Bundesliga scandal in the 1970/71 season when numerous players, coaches and officials were involved in game shifts. The extent and effects were regarded as even greater than in the previous manipulations in football. Some newspapers refer to this scandal as the "biggest fraud scandal of all time" and Peter Limacher, head of the disciplinary department of UEFA, spoke of it as the "biggest fraud scandal ever in European football".

According to information from the Bochum prosecutor's office on 20 November 2009, at least 200 football matches had been manipulated in nine European countries since the beginning of 2009. The fraudsters had bribed players, coaches and officials to influence gameplay.

Two Croatian brothers, Ante and Milan Sapina, were arrested on 19 November 2009 and charged with fraud, involving the betting on manipulated games in Asia through the provider.

The UEFA European Football Association suspended Ukrainian referee Oleg Orijechow in connection with the betting scandal. Orijechow had supposedly been in personal contact with a member of the betting mafia, according to Spiegel Online. He was summoned to Nyon for a personal hearing at the Federation Center following an investigation by UEFA's anti-corruption unit. UEFA revealed in March 2009 that they were bringing charges against an unnamed European club, later revealed to be Macedonian side FK Pobeda. Pobeda were found guilty of match-fixing in a tie against Armenian club Pyunik in 2004. As a consequence, the club was handed an eight-year ban from all European competitions, and club president Aleksandar Zabrčanec and former captain Nikolce Zdravevski were given lifetime European football bans. UEFA president Michel Platini revealed that his organisation was stepping up their efforts to eradicate match fixing in the game, and that 27,000 fixtures would be monitored in the 2009–10 season.

The fraud was discovered through telephone tapping of organised crime activities and has been investigated by the Prosecutorial Office at Bochum, Germany. On 19 November 2009 a series of raids were conducted in the UK, Germany, Switzerland and Austria in relation to the betting investigation. They resulted in fifteen arrests in Germany, and a further two in Switzerland, as well as the seizure of cash and property.

== Affected games and suspects ==
=== Germany ===
In Germany, at least 32 games from the 2. Bundesliga to the junior leagues were manipulated. Including four games from the 2. Bundesliga, three games from the 3. Liga, 18 games in the Regionalliga, Oberliga games and two games from the U-19 division.

In September 2010, the public-law TV magazine Fakt reported that thirteen second tier and five third tier league games, twenty regional league games, five league games, as well as two games in the DFB-Pokal, five U-19 games and other individual friendly games, were under suspicion of manipulation.

A DFB referee was also accused of having been bribed by the alleged fraudulent betters in a regional league game in May 2009.

In course of the investigation, basketball player of the Brose Baskets from Bamberg, Ivan Pavić, and the Würzburger landes league player, Kristian Sprećaković, were also arrested on 19 November 2009.

Four games of SSV Ulm 1846 in the final phase of the Regionalliga season 2008–09 were under suspicion of manipulation. On 27 November 2009, the club announced the denunciation of the Croatian players Davor Kraljević, Marijo Marinović and Dinko Radojević in association with the match-fixing scandal.

On 24 November 2009, Regionalliga club SC Verl suspended midfielders Patrick Neumann and Tim Hagedorn from games and training. The club received indications of attempted tampering for the game against Borussia Mönchengladbach II (4–3 win) and 1. FC Köln II (1–0 loss) in the 2008–09 season. On 28 November 2009, Neumann admitted to Bochum prosecutor's office that he received 500€, making him the first professional to sign a confession in the match-fixing scandal. However, he continued to deny any activity in the manipulations.

Marcel Schuon confirmed to the Bochum prosecutor's office that during his time at VfL Osnabrück, manipulation took place in a 3–0 defeat to FC Augsburg on 17 April 2009 in the 2. Bundesliga. He refused to inform anyone until after the game. Schuon was issued a five-figure fine. At the beginning of the 2009–10 season, Schuon switched to 3. Liga team SV Sandhausen, where he was removed at the end of November 2009 due to his involvement in the match-fixing scandal.

=== Austria ===
In Austria, eleven matches of the Bundesliga and the First League were affected.

According to UEFA, no Austrian clubs were specifically involved in the betting scandal. Only two European League qualifying matches of the SK Rapid Wien against KS Vllaznia Shkodra (5–0 and 3–0 for Rapid) were suspected of manipulation according to press reports. At the beginning of March 2011, betting allegations about the Austrian Bundesliga club Kapfenberger SV were announced, where, according to various media reports, players of the club had been handed large sums of money, and accused of having perilously lost the 2009–10 season games against FC Red Bull Salzburg (4–0 loss), Rapid Wien (1–0 loss) and Austria Wien (1–0 loss). Also at this time, a defensive player from Kapfenberg, among others, was reported to have received €200,000 through a middleman.

=== Switzerland ===
In Switzerland, 22 matches of the Challenge League and six test games were affected. At least one attempt to manipulate games of the Super League had occurred, but the addressed player reported the bribery attempt to the federation. Two suspects have been arrested.

==== Suspicions towards games of FC Thun ====
The federal prosecutor suspected FC Thun players to have manipulated the game against Yverdon Sport FC on 26 April. The suspicion was that FC Thun should lose the game with four goals difference, and the game actually ended 5-1. The Thun striker Pape Omar Faye was interrogated by the police, the week before the trophy game against Winterthur (22 November 2009) and then suspended by the club. Since a striker, from his playing position, can hardly be responsible for five goals against, other players were suspected of having received several 10,000 euros.

==== Suspicions towards games of FC Gossau ====
FC Gossau suffered a striking series of defeats at the end of the 2008/09 season. The federal prosecutor suspected specifically players of FC Gossau of having manipulated the games against FC Locarno on 24 May 2009 and against Servette FC. FC Gossau was expected to lose the game against Locarno with at least four goals difference and the game actually ended 0-4. The then goalkeeper of Gossau, Darko Damjanović, was said have been taken into custody by police, but went undercover. Gossau’s midfielder, Mario Bigoni, publicly stated that a previous season's game was "not clean" and that he had received a bid from a fellow player. Although it was not known if Bigoni had accepted the offer, he was suspended by his club. Also supposedly Gossau received tens of thousands of euros, 20,000 alone for the game against Locarno. On 26 October 2011, the police confirmed that Bigoni had been found dead three days earlier in the Alter Rhein near Rheineck.

==== Test game ====
The Bosnian club, NK Travnik, completed a training camp in Switzerland in the summer of 2009, with test matches against the clubs Neuchâtel Xamax (2-3), Servette FC Genève (1-3) and FC Sion (1-4). It became known that a betting syndicate from Asia was financially involved in the costs of the training camp. The president of FC Sion, Christian Constantin, publicly voiced the suspicions that the Bosnians let win FC Sion.

=== China ===
The Chinese police arrested a total of sixteen people, including twelve club members and four high-ranking football officials, including the former vice president of the Chinese Football Association, Yang Xu, on 25 November 2009, in the wake of the international inquiries of the betting scandal.

=== Matches investigated by UEFA ===
All matches under investigation were played in 2009.

Competition or country	Number of games investigated	Level or round of competition
UEFA Champions League	3	Qualifying rounds
UEFA Europa League	12	Qualifying rounds
Germany	32	2. Bundesliga, 3. Liga, Regionalliga, and Oberliga
Belgium	17	Second Division
Switzerland	22	Challenge League
Croatia	14	Prva HNL
Slovenia	7	PrvaLiga
Turkey	29	Süper Lig
Hungary	13	Hungarian National Championship I
Bosnia and Herzegovina	8	Premier League of Bosnia and Herzegovina
Austria	11	Austrian Bundesliga and First League
UEFA European Under-21 Football Championship	Unknown	Unknown

UEFA revealed on 25 November 2009 that seven matches played in UEFA competitions would be investigated in further detail, and that five clubs were under investigation; KF Tirana, FC Dinaburg, KS Vllaznia, NK IB Ljubljana and Budapest Honvéd. It also revealed that it was conducting its own investigation of three referees and one other individual connected with UEFA in relation to these games.

==== UEFA detailed on 7 manipulated games ====
2nd qualifying round for the Champions League

- Stabaek IF – KF Tirana (4-0 on 21 July 2009)

2nd qualifying round for the Europa League

- SK Rapid Wien - KS Vllaznia (5-0 on 16 July 2009)
- Bnei Yehuda Tel Aviv F.C. - FC Dinaburg (4-0 on 16 July 2009)
- KS Vllaznia - SK Rapid Wien (0-3 on 23 July 2009)
- FC Dinaburg - Bnei Yehuda Tel Aviv F.C. (0-1 on 23 July 2009)

3rd qualifying round for the Europa League

- Fenerbahce Istanbul - Budapest Honvéd (5-1 on 30 July 2009)
- NK IB Ljubljana - Metalurg Donetsk (0-3 on 6 August 2009)

== Betting Scandal in Italy ==
Independent from the investigations conducted by the Bochum prosecutor's office, another betting scandal was reported in Italy on 23 November 2009. The President of the Italian football club Potenza, Giuseppe Postiglione, and eight other officials (including Antonio Lopiano and Antonio De Angelis) of Potenza, and Antonio Possidente, a member of the Mafia, were arrested by the Carabinieri for tampering Football matches. The several month long investigation involved a game of the Serie B in the 2007/08 season, as well as, seven games of the Lega Pro Prima Divisione in the 2008/09 season.

== Legal proceedings ==
On 14 April 2011, the 13th Criminal Court of the Bochum District, sentenced better Tuna A. and the betting office operator Stevan R., to three years and eight months and three years and eleven months, on the account of fraud. Betting office operator Nürretin G. was given a three-year prison sentence on the account of fraud. Tuna A. and Nurretin G. had already spent 13 months of their sentence while being held during examination. In the course of the trial, all three defendants had admitted to the manipulation of 32 games and of having bribed players.

In May 2011, Ante Sapina was sentenced to five and a half years' imprisonment by the District Court of Bochum. Marijo Cvrtak was also sentenced to five and a half years' imprisonment and Dragan M. received a probation sentence of one year and six months.

In December 2012, the Federal Court of Justice declared the previous rulings against Sapina and an accomplices for non-appealable and dismissed them.

In March 2013, Milan Sapina was sentenced to ten months' imprisonment by the district court of Bochum, the sentence was largely waived in March 2014, leaving only a four-month imprisonment time.

In April 2014, Ante Sapina was sentenced to five years' imprisonment by the District Court of Bochum.

== See also ==
- 2011 Turkish football match-fixing scandal
