= Marco Franin =

Swiss footballer (born 1992)

Personal information
- Full name: Marco Franin
- Date of birth: 1 February 1992 (age 34)
- Place of birth: Herisau, Switzerland
- Height: 1.80 m (5 ft 11 in)
- Position: Defender

Team information
- Current team: Gossau
- Number: 19

Youth career
- 2004–2010: St. Gallen
- 2008–2009: → FC Winkeln SG (loan)

Senior career*
| Years | Team | Apps | (Gls) |
| 2010–2014 | St. Gallen II | 96 | (2) |
| 2013–2014 | St. Gallen | 6 | (0) |
| 2014–2016 | Chiasso | 18 | (0) |
| 2016–2020 | Brühl | | |
| 2020- | Gossau | | |
- * Club domestic league appearances and goals as of 25 November 2015

Marco Franin (born 1 February 1992) is a Swiss/Croatian footballer currently playing for FC Gossau in the fourth tier-Swiss 1. Liga.

== Club career ==
Franin has played for Swiss top flight side St. Gallen, moved to second level-Chiasso in 2014 and joined Promotion League outfit Brühl from them in summer 2016.
