= Nguyễn Huỳnh Quốc Cường =

Vietnamese footballer

Personal information
- Full name: Nguyễn Huỳnh Quốc Cường
- Date of birth: 12 July 1982 (age 44)
- Place of birth: Kỳ Sơn, Nghệ An, Vietnam
- Height: 1.82 m (6 ft 0 in)
- Position: Goalkeeper

Youth career
- 2006–2010: Sông Lam Nghệ An

Senior career*
Years	Team	Apps	(Gls)
2011	Sông Lam Nghệ An	21	(0)
2012	Navibank Sài Gòn	1	(0)
2013–2017	Long An	63	(0)
- * Club domestic league appearances and goals as of 28 August 2016

Nguyễn Huỳnh Quốc Cường (born 12 July 1982) is a Vietnamese footballer who plays as a goalkeeper for V-League (Vietnam) club Long An.
