= Vương Quốc Trung =

Vietnamese footballer

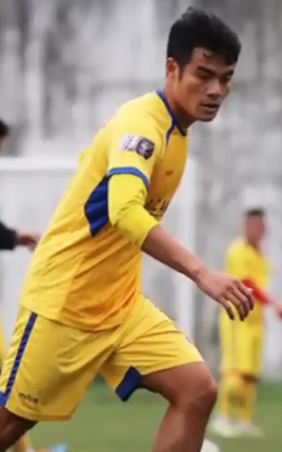
- Quốc Trung in 2019

Personal information
- Full name: Vương Quốc Trung
- Date of birth: May 29, 1990 (age 36)
- Place of birth: Tương Dương, Nghệ An, Vietnam
- Height: 1.73 m (5 ft 8 in)
- Position: Midfielder

Youth career
- 2004–2010: Sông Lam Nghệ An

Senior career*
Years	Team	Apps	(Gls)
2011–2012	Sông Lam Nghệ An	17	(8)
2013–2018	Hải Phòng	90	(3)
2018–2019	Thanh Hóa	20	(2)
2020	Sông Lam Nghệ An	3	(0)
2021–2022	Phù Đổng	25	(0)
Total		155	(13)

International career^{‡}
2015	Vietnam	1	(0)
- * Club domestic league appearances and goals as of 22 July 2018 (UTC) ‡ National team caps and goals as of 17 May 2015 (UTC)

Vương Quốc Trung (born 29 May 1990) is a Vietnamese former footballer who played as a midfielder. He capped once for Vietnam national team in 2015.
