= Nguyễn Công Huy =

Vietnamese footballer

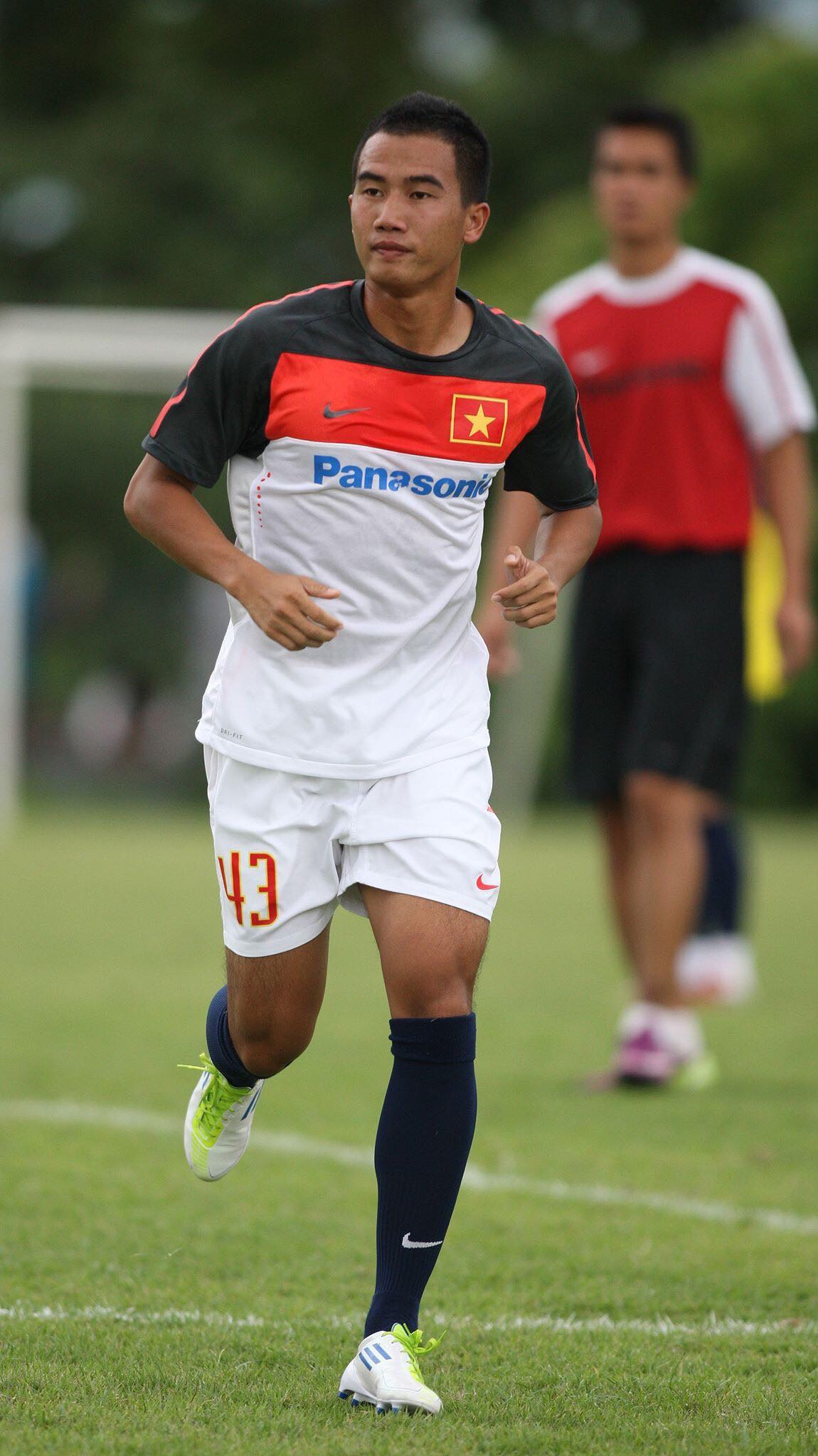
- Công Huy in 2012

Personal information
- Full name: Nguyễn Công Huy
- Date of birth: 19 May 1987 (age 39)
- Place of birth: Đông Sơn, Thanh Hóa, Vietnam
- Height: 1.76 m (5 ft 9 in)
- Position: Midfielder

Youth career
- 2000–2007: Thể Công

Senior career*
Years	Team	Apps	(Gls)
2008–2010	Thể Công	19	(0)
2010–2012	Lam Sơn Thanh Hóa	16	(0)
2012–2013	Becamex Bình Dương	2	(0)
2014–2018	Bình Định	58	(0)

International career
2007–2009	Vietnam U23	1	(0)
2008–2012	Vietnam	2	(0)
- * Club domestic league appearances and goals

Nguyễn Công Huy (born 19 May 1987 in Thanh Hóa) is a Vietnamese footballer who play as a midfielder for club Bình Định.
