= Võ Hoàng Quảng =

Vietnamese footballer

Personal information
- Full name: Võ Hoàng Quảng
- Date of birth: 2 May 1987 (age 39)
- Place of birth: Đà Nẵng, Vietnam
- Height: 1.75 m (5 ft 9 in)
- Position: Right-back

Youth career
- 2005–2007: SHB Đà Nẵng

Senior career*
Years	Team	Apps	(Gls)
2008	Hà Nội	2	(0)
2009–2017	SHB Đà Nẵng	110	(3)
2018	Sài Gòn	15	(0)
2018–2019	Becamex Bình Dương	14	(0)
2020–2021	Bà Rịa Vũng Tàu	11	(0)
2022	SHB Đà Nẵng	21	(0)

International career^{‡}
2009–2010	Vietnam U23	1	(0)
2009–2015	Vietnam	3	(0)
- * Club domestic league appearances and goals as of 22 June 2018 ‡ National team caps and goals as of 04 June 2018

Võ Hoàng Quảng (born 2 May 1987) is a Vietnamese footballer who plays as a right back for V.League 1 club SHB Đà Nẵng and the Vietnam national football team.
