= Tostao Kwashi =

Zimbabwean footballer and manager (born 1979)

Tostao Kwashi Lê Tostao
Personal information
- Full name: Fungai "Tostao" Kwashi
- Date of birth: 22 December 1979 (age 46)
- Place of birth: Harare, Zimbabwe
- Height: 1.77 m (5 ft 10 in)
- Position: Right winger

Youth career
- 1987/88–1996: CAPS United F.C.

Senior career*
Years	Team	Apps	(Gls)
1996–2000	CAPS United	59	(12)
2001–2002	Fisher Athletic	19	(4)
2002–2003	Gravesend & Northfleet	33	(5)
2003–2004	Margate	3	(0)
2004	Dartford	17	(7)
2005–2006	Long An	8	(6)
2006	Hải Phòng	1	(0)
2006–2009	Long An	38	(9)
2010–2011	Lam Sơn Thanh Hóa	10	(0)
2011–2012	Long An	16	(3)
2012–2013	Xuân Thành Sài Gòn	5	(0)

International career
1997–1999	Zimbabwe U23	3	(0)
1999–2005	Zimbabwe	9	(0)

Managerial career
- 2014–2016: CAPS United F.C. (assistant)
- * Club domestic league appearances and goals

Fungai "Tostao" Kwashi (born 22 December 1979) is a Zimbabwean assistant football manager.

The Zimbabwe international was revealed as an assistant coach for CAPS United F.C. in 2014. According to a sports correspondent, he was inspired by his father Steve "Dude" Kwashi to coach at his former club.

== Playing career ==
He was handed his debut at age 16 in an encounter versus Black Aces in 1996.

Studying at Greenwich University while playing for Dartford F.C., he netted 17 goals and was admired for his goal-scoring ability by the fans.

Amateur club Gravesend & Northfleet were unable to condone his illicit behavior and decided to let him go at the end of the August 2003.

An array of European and African clubs expressed desire to sign him in 2008.

Tostao won V league title with Dongtam Long An in 2005, Vilube FA Cup.The striker also won 2 Super Cups with Hai Phong FC in 2007 and 2010 with Thanh Hoa FC.

== Personal life ==
President of Vietnam Nguyễn Minh Triết officially agreed to confer citizenship upon Kwashi Tostao in 2010.
