= Aleksandar Zabrčanec =

Aleksandar Zabrčanec (Macedonian: Александар Забрчанец) is a former president of FK Pobeda in the Macedonian First League. Zabrčanec received a lifetime ban by the UEFA in 2009 after he was found to have fixed a qualifying match.
