= Heinz Bigler (footballer, born 1949) =

Swiss footballer and manager (1949–2021)

Personal information
- Date of birth: 27 January 1949
- Date of death: 20 December 2021 (aged 72)
- Position: Defender

Senior career*
Years	Team	Apps	(Gls)
- Young Boys
- FC Thun
1972–1977	St. Gallen		

Managerial career
- 1991–1992: St. Gallen
- 1992–1994: FC Schaffhausen
- 1995–1996: FC Gossau
- 1998: FC Winterthur
- * Club domestic league appearances and goals

Heinz Bigler (27 January 1949 – 20 December 2021) was a Swiss footballer and manager who played as a defender. He died on 20 December 2021, at the age of 72.
