= Huỳnh Văn Ảnh =

Vietnamese footballer (born 1960)

Personal information
- Date of birth: 1960 (age 65–66)
- Place of birth: Vietnam

Senior career*
Years	Team	Apps	(Gls)
1982–1998	HAGL		
- * Club domestic league appearances and goals

Huỳnh Văn Ảnh (born 1960) is a Vietnamese former football manager and player.

== Early life ==
He is a native of Binh Dinh, Vietnam.

== Career ==
He managed Vietnamese side HAGL, helping the club achieve promotion.

== Personal life ==
He has been married.
