= 2014 Vietnamese Cup =

Tournament details
- Country: Vietnam

Final positions
- Champions: Vicem Hải Phòng
- Runners-up: Becamex Bình Dương

Tournament statistics
- Matches played: 20

The 2014 Vietnamese Cup is the 22nd edition of the Vietnamese National Cup. It began on 8 March 2014 and finished on 17 August 2014.

== First round ==
8 March 2014	Cần Thơ	2–1	Hùng Vương An Giang
15:30	Souleymane Diabate 60'; Nguyễn Huỳnh Kiếm Linh 71'		Đinh Hoàng Max 33' (pen.)

8 March 2014	Đắk Lắk	1–0	Hanoi
15:30	Nguyễn Mậu Thìn 83'

9 March 2014	Tây Ninh	0–2	Becamex Bình Dương
			Nguyễn Anh Đức 19'; Abass Cheikh Dieng 45+1'

9 March 2014	Sanna Khánh Hòa	2–1	Huda Huế
	Nguyễn Đình Việt 58'; Cao Văn Triều 90+1'		Phan Hữu Vân 36'

9 March 2014	Ho Chi Minh	0–0 (5–6 p)	Đồng Tháp

== Second round ==
17 May 2014	Cần Thơ	0–2	Vicem Hải Phòng
15:30			Hoàng Đình Tùng 7', 46'	Attendance: 500; Referee: Nguyễn Ngọc Châu

17 May 2014	Đồng Tâm Long An	3–2	Thanh Hóa
15:30	Ganiyu Oseni 52', 59' (pen.); Nguyễn Đình Hiệp 63'		Lê Văn Tân 27'; Đinh Văn Ta 33'	Attendance: 1,000; Referee: Nguyễn Đức Vũ

18 May 2014	Hoàng Anh Gia Lai	5–1	Đồng Nai
15:30	Lê Hoàng Thiên 11', 57'; Bùi Trần Vũ 28'; Trần Minh Vương 49'; Felix Ogbuke 89' (pen.)		Melquiades C. Gomez 15' (pen.)	Attendance: 2,000; Referee: Nguyễn Hiền Triết

18 May 2014	Than Quảng Ninh	2–1	Sanna Khánh Hòa
15:30	Nguyễn Huy Cường 5'; Uche Iheruome 24'		Trần Đình Kha 38'	Attendance: 6,000; Referee: Nguyễn Tuấn Anh

18 May 2014	SHB Đà Nẵng	5–2	Đồng Tháp
15:30	Mariano Bernardo 7'; Hồ Ngọc Thắng 26', 45', 80'; Huỳnh Quốc Anh 36'		Nguyễn Thanh Hiền 35'; Trần Minh Lợi 73'	Attendance: 3,000; Referee: Hoàng Ngọc Hà

18 May 2014	Hanoi T&T	0–0 (3–5 p)	Đắk Lắk
15:30				Attendance: 500; Referee: Nguyễn Hoàng Anh

20 May 2014	Becamex Bình Dương	2–0	Sông Lam Nghệ An
15:30	Moses Oloya 36'; Huỳnh Kesley Alves 63'

XM The Vissai Ninh Bình	3–0; Awarded	QNK Quảng Nam

- Ninh Bình wrote to the Vietnam Football Federation (VFF) and to the Vietnam Professional Football Joint Stock Company to be allowed to stop their participation in the league/cup and also the AFC Cup due to 13 players being involved in match fixing. They had played 8 league matches and were third from bottom at the time. Following their withdrawal from the league, all team results were declared null and void. QNK Quảng Nam awarded as 3–0 after Ninh Bình withdraw.

== Quarter-finals ==
8 June 2014	Becamex Bình Dương	2–1	SHB Đà Nẵng
15:30

8 June 2014	Vicem Hải Phòng	3–1	QNK Quảng Nam
15:30

8 June 2014	Than Quảng Ninh	2–2 (3–4 p)	Hoàng Anh Gia Lai
15:30

10 June 2014	Đắk Lắk	1–3	Đồng Tâm Long An
15:30

== Semi-finals ==
12 July 2014	Đồng Tâm Long An	1–3	Vicem Hải Phòng

12 July 2014	Becamex Bình Dương	3–1	Hoàng Anh Gia Lai

== Final ==
17 August 2014	Becamex Bình Dương	0–2	Vicem Hải Phòng
