= Darko Damjanović =

Serbian-Swiss footballer (born 1977)

Personal information
- Date of birth: 5 November 1977 (age 48)
- Height: 1.90 m (6 ft 3 in)
- Position: Goalkeeper

Senior career*
Years	Team	Apps	(Gls)
1996–1997	Rorschacht		
1997–1998	Gossau		
1998–1999	Kreuzlingen		
2000–2003	Wil	29	(0)
2003–2004	Kreuzlingen		
2005–2007	Herisau	57	(0)
2007–2009	Gossau	59	(0)
2009–2010	Linth		
2012	Mačva Šabac		
- * Club domestic league appearances and goals

Darko Damjanović (Serbian Cyrillic: Дарко Дамјановић, born 5 November 1977) is a former Serbian-Swiss football goalkeeper.

He played 5 games in Swiss Super League in 2002–03 season.

During the winter break of the 2011/12 season he joined Serbian club FK Mačva Šabac.
