= T&T Baoercheng FC =

Vietnamese football club

- Full name: T&T Baoercheng
- Nickname(s): Red Devils
- Founded: 2004 as VST Youth Football Center; 2008 as Saigon United; 2010 as T&T Baoercheng
- Dissolved: 2014
- League: Vietnam First Division
- 2009: 13th
Home colours	Away colours

T&T Baoercheng FC was a Vietnamese football club.

== Saigon United threatens to sue VFF ==
Saigon United threatens to sue the Vietnam Football Federation in the international sports court after Quang Ngai's demotion which means that some of their victories are not recognized, Saigon United (SU) claims, leading to a loss of points that downgrades their team to the Second Division Tournament for the 2010 season.

Saigon United was denied an official voice at the sixth-term meeting of the Vietnam Football Federation for failing to register in time.

The Second Division club, which is taking its case for reinstatement in the First Division to the court of arbitration, was meant to register by September 30 but left it too late.

Because of the mistake, Saigon United was reduced to the role of observer at the preparatory meeting on Wednesday.

The club's case for reinstatement in the First Division is that it was unfairly penalized when the VFF demoted Quang Ngai.
