= Vietnamese National Football Cup =

National Cup Cúp Quốc gia
- Organiser(s): Vietnam Professional Football
- Founded: 1992; 34 years ago
- Region: Vietnam
- Teams: 24
- Qualifier for: ASEAN Club Championship
- Domestic cup: Vietnamese Super Cup
- Current champions: Công An Hồ Chí Minh City (3rd title)
- Most championships: Becamex Bình Dương; Sông Lam Nghệ An; Hà Nội; Công An Hồ Chí Minh City (3 titles each)
- Broadcaster(s): FPT Play (All matches); TV360 (except with network-only commentary between half); VTV (VTV6); HTV (HTV Thể Thao) (FPT produces all matches except when VTV and HTV is live)
- Website: vpf.vn
- 2025–26 Vietnamese Cup

Vietnamese National Football Cup (Vietnamese: Giải Bóng đá Cúp Quốc Gia Việt Nam), officially stylized as the National Cup (Vietnamese: Cúp Quốc gia), is a Vietnamese football competition and the main domestic tournament serving V.League 1 and V.League 2 participants.

The Vietnamese Cup was first held in 1992. Cảng Sài Gòn was the first cup winner.

== Format ==
Since 2004, entry is open to all teams that competed in the V.League 1 and the V.League 2. The two teams that reach the final were exempt from the preliminary rounds of the next year's competition. The cup winners will qualify to the group stage of ASEAN Club Championship.

V.League 1 teams are allowed to use only one foreign player if they play against a V.League 2 team.

The Vietnamese National Cup winner will also qualify for a single match of the Vietnamese Super Cup against the V.League 1 champion. If one team won both the National Cup and V.League titles, then the runner-up team of the V.League 1 will be qualified for the Super Cup.

== Winners ==
Year	Champions	Score	Runners-up	Finals venue
1992	Cảng Sài Gòn	1–1 (5–4 pen.)	Quân Đội	Thống Nhất Stadium, Ho Chi Minh City
1993	Quảng Nam-Đà Nẵng	2–1	Tổng Cục Đường Sắt	Chi Lăng Stadium, Da Nang
1994	Sông Bé	1–0	Cảng Sài Gòn	Thống Nhất Stadium, Ho Chi Minh City
1995	Công An Hải Phòng	1–0	Công An Hà Nội	Hàng Đẫy Stadium, Hanoi
1996	Hải Quan	0–0 (6–5 pen.)	Cảng Sài Gòn	Thống Nhất Stadium, Ho Chi Minh City
1997	Hải Quan (2)	3–0	Cảng Sài Gòn	Chi Lăng Stadium, Da Nang
1998	Công An Hồ Chí Minh City	2–0	Hải Quan	Thống Nhất Stadium, Ho Chi Minh City
1999–2000	Cảng Sài Gòn (2)	2–1	Công An Hồ Chí Minh City	Thống Nhất Stadium, Ho Chi Minh City
2000–2001	Công An Hồ Chí Minh City (2)	2–1	Công An Hà Nội	Hà Nội Stadium, Hanoi
2001–2002	Pico Sông Lam Nghệ An	1–0	Thừa Thiên-Huế	Vinh Stadium, Nghệ An
2003	Pisico Bình Định	2–1	Đông Á Bank	Quy Nhơn Stadium, Bình Định
2004	Pisico Bình Định (2)	2–0	Quân Đội	Vinh Stadium, Nghệ An
2005	Đồng Tâm Long An	5–0	Hải Phòng	Long An Stadium, Long An
2006	Hoà Phát Hà Nội	2–1	Đồng Tâm Long An	Ninh Bình Stadium, Ninh Bình
2007	Đạm Phú Mỹ Nam Định	1–0	Pisico Bình Định	Ninh Bình Stadium, Ninh Bình
2008	Hà Nội ACB	1–0	Becamex Bình Dương	Hàng Đẫy Stadium, Hanoi
2009	SHB Đà Nẵng (2)	1–0	Thể Công	Hàng Đẫy Stadium, Hanoi
2010	Sông Lam Nghệ An (2)	1–0	Hoàng Anh Gia Lai	Thống Nhất Stadium, Ho Chi Minh City
2011	Navibank Sài Gòn	3–0	Sông Lam Nghệ An	Thống Nhất Stadium, Ho Chi Minh City
2012	Sài Gòn Xuân Thành	4–1	Hà Nội T&T	Thống Nhất Stadium, Ho Chi Minh City
2013	Vissai Ninh Bình	1–1 (6–5 pen.)	SHB Đà Nẵng	Chi Lăng Stadium, Da Nang
2014	Hải Phòng (2)	2–0	Becamex Bình Dương	Lạch Tray Stadium, Hải Phòng
2015	Becamex Bình Dương (2)	4–2	Hà Nội T&T	Gò Đậu Stadium, Bình Dương
2016	Than Quảng Ninh	4–4; 2–1	Hà Nội T&T	Cẩm Phả Stadium, Quảng Ninh; Hàng Đẫy Stadium, Hanoi
2017	Sông Lam Nghệ An (3)	2–1; 5–1	Becamex Bình Dương	Gò Đậu Stadium, Bình Dương; Vinh Stadium, Nghệ An
2018	Becamex Bình Dương (3)	3–1	FLC Thanh Hóa	Tam Kỳ Stadium, Quảng Nam
2019	Hà Nội	2–1	Quảng Nam	Tam Kỳ Stadium, Quảng Nam
2020	Hà Nội (2)	2–1	Viettel	Hàng Đẫy Stadium, Hanoi
2022	Hà Nội (3)	2–0	Topenland Bình Định	Hàng Đẫy Stadium, Hanoi
2023	Đông Á Thanh Hóa	(0–0) (5–3 pen.)	Viettel	Thanh Hóa Stadium, Thanh Hóa
2023–24	Đông Á Thanh Hóa (2)	(0–0) (9–8 pen.)	Hà Nội	Thanh Hóa Stadium, Thanh Hóa
2024–25	Công An Hà Nội	5–0	Sông Lam Nghệ An	Vinh Stadium, Nghệ An
2025–26	Cong An Hồ Chí Minh City (3)	2–1	Ninh Bình	Ninh Bình Stadium, Ninh Bình

== Top-performing clubs ==
Clubs	Champion	Runner-up
Hà Nội	3 (2019, 2020, 2022)	4 (2012, 2015, 2016, 2023–24)
Becamex Bình Dương/Sông Bé	3 (1994, 2015, 2018)	3 (2008, 2014, 2017)
Hồ Chí Minh City/Cảng Sài Gòn/Công An Hồ Chí Minh City	3 (1992, 1999–2000, 2025–26)	3 (1994, 1996, 1997)
Sông Lam Nghệ An	3 (2001–02, 2010, 2017)	1 (2011)
Bình Định	2 (2003, 2004)	2 (2007, 2022)
Công An Hồ Chí Minh City (1979)	2 (1998, 2000–01)	1 (1999–2000)
Đông Á Thanh Hóa	2 (2023, 2023–24)	1 (2018)
Hải Quan	2 (1996, 1997)	1 (1998)
SHB Đà Nẵng	2 (1993, 2009)	1 (2013)
Hải Phòng	2 (1995, 2014)	1 (2005)
Cong An Hà Nội	1 (2024–25)	1 (1995, 2000–01)
Hà Nội ACB	1 (2008)	1 (1995)
Đông Á Bank/Vissai Ninh Bình	1 (2013)	1 (2003)
Long An	1 (2005)	-
Hòa Phát Hà Nội	1 (2006)	-
Nam Định	1 (2007)	-
Navibank Sài Gòn	1 (2011)	-
Xuân Thành Sài Gòn	1 (2012)	-
Than Quảng Ninh	1 (2016)	
Quân Đội/Thể Công/Viettel	-	5 (1992, 2004, 2009, 2020, 2023)
Tổng Cục Đường Sắt	-	1 (1993)
Huế	-	1 (2001–02)
Hoàng Anh Gia Lai	-	1 (2010)
Quảng Nam	-	1 (2019)
Ninh Bình	-	1 (2025–26)

== See also ==
- Football in Vietnam
