= Hòa Phát Hà Nội FC =

Vietnamese football club

Hòa Phát Hà Nội
- Full name: Câu lạc bộ bóng đá Hòa Phát Hà Nội
- Founded: 2003; 23 years ago
- Dissolved: 2011; 15 years ago
- Ground: Hàng Đẫy Stadium; Hanoi, Vietnam
- Capacity: 22,000
- Final season 2011: V-League, 10th
Home colours	Away colours

Hòa Phát Hà Nội was a Vietnamese football club based in Hanoi. It was merged with Hà Nội ACB into Hà Nội in September 2011.

== Honours ==
=== National competitions ===
League

- V.League 2:

(silver) Runners-up : 2004, 2009
Cup

- Vietnamese Cup:

(gold) Winners : 2006

== Performance in AFC competitions ==
- AFC Cup: 1 appearance

2007: Group stage

Season	Competition	Round	Club	Home	Away	
2007	AFC Cup	Group stage	(Malaysia) Negeri Sembilan FA	0–0	0–0	4th
2007	AFC Cup	Group stage	(Hong Kong) Sun Hei	1–2	4–7	4th
2007	AFC Cup	Group stage	(Maldives) Victory Sports Club	0–2	2–2	4th
