= Hà Nội FC (1956) =

Vietnamese football club

Hanoi FC
- Full name: Câu lạc bộ bóng đá Hà Nội ACB
- Founded: 1956; 70 years ago as Railway Authority; 2000; 26 years ago as Hanoi ACB; 2012; 14 years ago as Hanoi FC
- Dissolved: 2012; 14 years ago
- Ground: Hàng Đẫy Stadium; Hanoi, Vietnam
- Capacity: 22,000
- Chairman: Nguyễn Đức Kiên
- 2012: V.League, 9th
Home colours	Away colours

Hanoi Football Club (Vietnamese: Câu lạc bộ bóng đá Hà Nội) was a Vietnamese football club based in the capital Hanoi.

Hanoi's history can be traced back to the Railway Authority football club (Vietnamese: Tổng cục Đường sắt), one of the most prominent clubs in Vietnam from their foundation in 1956 until 2000. After that, the team merged with Cong An Ha Noi to become the Hanoi ACB team in 2001. In 2008, Hanoi ACB won the Vietnamese National Cup and went on to play in the 2009 AFC Cup. Two years after being relegated from the V-League in 2011, they merged with Hòa Phát Hà Nội to become the new Hanoi 1956 FC.

== History ==
=== Railway Authority period ===
The football club of the Railway Authority of Vietnam (Tổng cục Đường sắt) was established in 1956 and became one of the first football clubs in North Vietnam in general and in Hanoi in particular. During the war, the club was famous nationwide, second only to The Cong in terms of achievements. On 7 November 1976, representing North Vietnam, they had a historic match against the Southern representative at that time, Saigon Port. In 1980, the club became the champion of the first A1 National Football Championship as The Cong withdrew from playing in this tournament. In the 1985 season, the team failed to compete, ranked last in the reverse final round and had to be relegated to the A2 division. In 1989, the Railway Authority was dissolved, transformed into a State Enterprise with the name Vietnam Railway Union, operating on the principle of open market. The team was also renamed "Vietnam Railways F.C." (Đường sắt Việt Nam), but fans still referred to them as the Railway Authority.

In the period of the market economy, the team faced many difficulties in maintaining. In the early 2000s, the Vietnam Railways team was dissolved and transferred to the Asian Bank to become Hanoi Asian Bank Football Club, or Hanoi ACB.

=== Hanoi ACB period ===
Although it was a team with high achievements, but after many years of decline, the transferred force of Vietnam Railways was relatively weak. To regain the old strength, in addition to the reorganization, the team also cooperated with Song Lam Nghe An to build a force of young players.

After 2 years of investment, the team officially claimed the right to compete in the Vietnam National Football Championship V-League 2001–2002 and moved its headquarters to Hanoi. The team is also sponsored by LG Electronic, hence the name LG.ACB Football Club.

However, in the 2003 season, the team failed to play and fell back to the First Division. Also during the season, the Vietnam Airlines Corporation (which had just taken over the traditional football team of Hanoi Police) also announced that it would stop sponsoring the Vietnam Airlines Football Club because of a lack of funding. Despite not being sponsored, the club still managed to compete in the 2004 Vietnam National Football Championship. After that, ACB Sports Joint Stock Company has taken over the entire force of Vietnam Airlines FC. Most of the main players of the Vietnam Aviation team became the core of the new team called LG. Hanoi ACB, competing in the professional division V-League. The remaining personnel were gathered by the Hanoi Football Federation to form a semi-professional football team and sponsored by Hoa Phat Group, competing in the First Division under the name Hòa Phát Hà Nội.

In the middle of the 2006 season, LG withdrew its sponsorship, the club was renamed Hanoi – ACB. Also during this year, the Hòa Phát Hà Nội also officially switched to the professional model and competed in the V-League.

As a result of the lack of sponsorship, in 2008, both teams were unsuccessful and had to relegate to the First Division. In the 2009 football season, Hòa Phát Hà Nội managed to win promotion and the following year, the team once again played in the V-League after winning the 2010 First Division championship.

However, the 2011 season was an unlucky season, when the team finished bottom of the table and fell back to the First Division. At the end of 2011, the team's management unit, ACB Sports Joint Stock Company, took over Hòa Phát Hà Nội. Once again, there was a big change in personnel when most of Hòa Phát Hà Nội's squad was kept in the official squad to play in the league with the old Hòa Phát Hà Nội position with the new name Hanoi Football club or Hanoi 1956. Most of the old Hanoi ACB squad was transferred to the 2nd squad with the new name of Hanoi Youth Football Club and played in the First Division (second highest division in Vietnam behind V-League.

At the end of the 2012 season, the team ranked 9th in the league table. However, after the manager Nguyen Duc Kien was arrested, the team fell into a crisis. The club's leaders decided not to register for the 2013 V-League and also withdrew the name Hanoi Youth from the list of next year's First Division. This means that the professional club will no longer participate in football life.

== Names ==
- Câu lạc bộ bóng đá Ngân hàng Á Châu (2000–2001)
- Câu lạc bộ bóng đá LG.ACB (2002–2003)
- Câu lạc bộ bóng đá LG.Hà Nội.ACB (2003–2006)
- Câu lạc bộ bóng đá Hà Nội – ACB (2006–2011)
- Câu lạc bộ bóng đá Hà Nội (2012)

Tổng cục Đường sắt (1956–1989)
Đường sắt Việt Nam (1989–2000)
ACB (2000–2003)
LG.Hà Nội.ACB (2003–2006)
Hà Nội ACB (2006–2011)
Hà Nội 1956 (2012)

Công an Hà Nội (1956–2002)
Hàng không Việt Nam (2002–2003)
Hòa Phát Hà Nội (2003–2011)

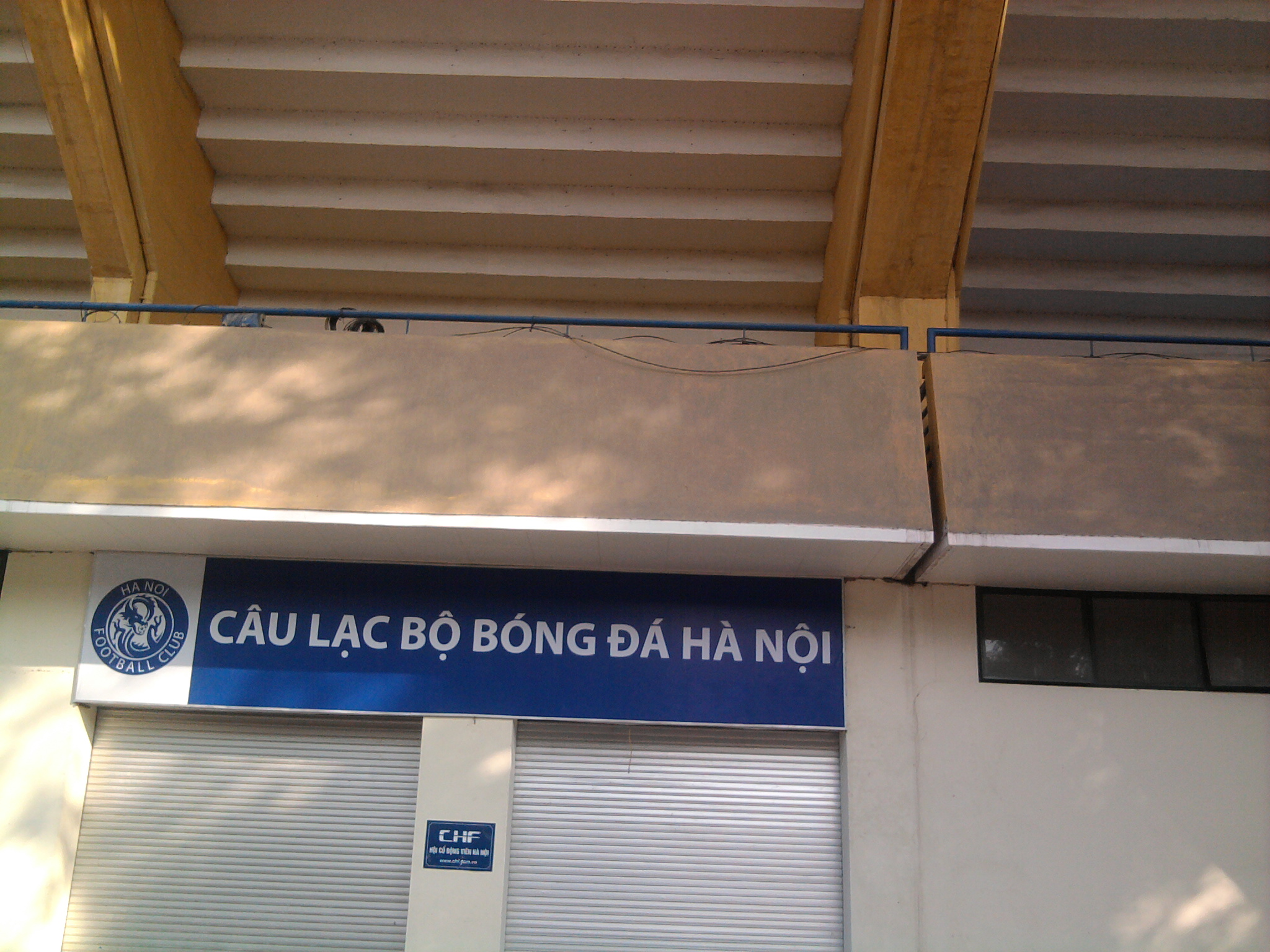
Hàng Đẫy Stadium Gate

== Honours ==
=== Domestic competitions ===
League

- V.League 1/A1 National League
  - Winners (1): 1980
- V.League 2
  - Winners (1): 2010
  - Runners-up (2): 2004, 2009

Cup

- Vietnamese Cup
  - Winners (1): 2008
- Vietnamese Super Cup:
  - Runners-up (1): 2008

== Performance in AFC competitions ==
- AFC Cup: 1 appearance

2009: Group stage

Season	Competition	Round		Club	Home	Away
2009	AFC Cup	Group G	(Malaysia) Kedah FA	3–1	0–7	4th
2009	AFC Cup	Group G	(Hong Kong) Eastern AA	3–0	0–3	4th
2009	AFC Cup	Group G	(Thailand) Chonburi F.C.	0–2	0–6	4th

== Season-by-season record ==
Season	Pld	Won	Draw	Lost	GF	GA	GD	PTS	Final position	Notes
2012 V-League	26	9	5	12	46	47	−1	32	9th	
2011 V-League	26	8	2	16	36	58	−22	26	14th	
2010 First League	24	13	6	5	50	33	+17	45	1st	Promoted to 2011 V-League
2009 First League	24	7	8	9	29	35	−6	29	8th	
2008 V-League	26	4	7	15	26	48	−22	19	13th	Relegation to 2009 Vietnamese First Division; Qualified for 2009 AFC Cup
2007 V-League	26	8	7	11	30	36	−6	31	11th	
2006 V-League	24	9	6	9	28	31	−3	33	8th	
2005 V-League	22	5	9	8	18	27	−9	24	11th	
2004 V-League	22	11	3	8	30	26	+4	36	5th	
2003 V-League	22	2	5	15	22	49	−27	11	12th	
