= 2024–25 V.League 1 =

69th season of the highest division of association football in Vietnam

2024–25 LPBank V.League 1
- Season: 2024–25
- Dates: 14 September 2024 – 22 June 2025
- Champions: Thep Xanh Nam Dinh; 2nd VL1 title 3rd Vietnamese title
- AFC Champions League Two: Thep Xanh Nam Dinh; Cong An Hanoi
- ASEAN Club Championship: Thep Xanh Nam Dinh; Cong An Hanoi
- Matches: 182
- Goals: 449 (2.47 per match)
- Top goalscorer: Lucão do Break; Alan Grafite (14 goals)
- Biggest home win: The Cong-Viettel 6–0 SHB Da Nang (2 May 2025)
- Biggest away win: Song Lam Nghe An 0–5 The Cong-Viettel (15 September 2024)
- Highest scoring: Cong An Hanoi 4–4 Quang Nam (15 February 2025)
- Longest winning run: Thep Xanh Nam Dinh (7 games)
- Longest unbeaten run: Thep Xanh Nam Dinh (15 games)
- Longest winless run: SHB Da Nang (11 games)
- Longest losing run: SHB Da Nang; Quy Nhon Binh Dinh (4 games)
- Highest attendance: 25,000; Thep Xanh Nam Dinh 1–0 Hong Linh Ha Tinh (22 June 2025)
- Lowest attendance: 900; Hanoi FC 5–1 Ho Chi Minh City (18 May 2025)
- Attendance: 947,000 (5,203 per match)

The 2024–25 V.League 1, known as the 2024–25 LPBank V.League 1 (Vietnamese: Giải bóng đá Vô địch Quốc gia LPBank 2024–25) for sponsorship reasons, was the 42nd season of the V.League 1, the highest division of Vietnamese football and the 25th as a professional league. The season began on 14 September 2024 and concluded on 22 June 2025.

Thep Xanh Nam Dinh were the defending champions and successfully defended their title with just 1 game to spare, after defeating Quang Nam 2–0 on 15 June 2025.

This season will be the second since the 2001-02 season to have an inter-year schedule (autumn-to-spring) instead of an intra-year schedule (spring-to-autumn) to follow the schedule changes in the AFC competitions. There was also a break from 8 December 2024 to 5 January 2025 for the 2024 ASEAN Championship.

This will be the second season that the league officially applies video assistant referee (VAR) technology and also will be the first that VAR applies to matches across the country instead of only the north the previous season.

== Teams ==
A total of 14 teams will participate in the 2024–25 edition of the V.League 1.

=== Changes from previous season ===
Promoted from 2023–24 V.League 2	Relegated to 2024–25 V.League 2
SHB Da Nang	Khanh Hoa

14 teams will compete in this season. The relegated team is Khanh Hoa, who have spent 2 seasons in the top flight ever since their promotion in 2022. The promoted team is SHB Da Nang, who have come back to the top flight after only one season in the V.League 2.

=== Name changes ===
- On 8 July 2024, MerryLand Quy Nhon Binh Dinh FC changed their name to Quy Nhon Binh Dinh FC.
- On 31 July 2024, LPBank Hoang Anh Gia Lai FC changed their name to Hoang Anh Gia Lai FC.

=== Stadiums and locations ===
Locations of the 2024–25 V.League 1 teams

Team	Location	Stadium	Capacity	Previous season rank
Becamex Binh Duong	Binh Duong	Go Dau	13,035	VL1 (8th)
Dong A Thanh Hoa	Thanh Hoa	Thanh Hoa	12,000	VL1 (9th)
Haiphong FC	Haiphong	Lach Tray	30,000	VL1 (7th)
Cong An Hanoi	Hanoi	Hang Day	22,500	VL1 (6th)
Hanoi FC	Hanoi	Hang Day	22,500	VL1 (3rd)
The Cong-Viettel	Hanoi	My Dinh	40,200	VL1 (5th)
Ho Chi Minh City FC	Ho Chi Minh City	Thong Nhat	16,000	VL1 (4th)
Hoang Anh Gia Lai	Gia Lai	Pleiku	12,000	VL1 (11th)
Hong Linh Ha Tinh	Ha Tinh	Ha Tinh	20,000	VL1 (13th)
Quang Nam FC	Quang Nam	Tam Ky; Hoa Xuan (temporary)	15,000; 20,500	VL1 (10th)
Quy Nhon Binh Dinh	Binh Dinh	Quy Nhon	15,000	VL1 (2nd)
SHB Da Nang	Da Nang	Hoa Xuan; Tam Ky (temporary)	20,500	VL2 (1st)
Song Lam Nghe An	Nghe An	Vinh	18,000	VL1 (12th)
Thep Xanh Nam Dinh	Nam Dinh	Thien Truong	30,000	VL1 (1st)

Notes

1. QNA: Quang Nam's home stadium Tam Ky was under renovations from the beginning of the season until February 2025. As the result, the club would share the Hoa Xuan Stadium with SHB Da Nang as its temporary home stadium.
2. SDN: Starting from February 2025, SHB Da Nang's Hoa Xuan Stadium was closed for renovation work. As the result, the club would share the Tam Ky with Quang Nam as its home stadium until the end of the season.

=== Number of teams by region ===
Number	Region	Team(s)
5	Red River Delta	Cong An Hanoi, Haiphong, Hanoi FC, The Cong-Viettel and Thep Xanh Nam Dinh
3	North Central	Dong A Thanh Hoa, Hong Linh Ha Tinh, and Song Lam Nghe An
3	South Central	Quy Nhon Binh Dinh, Quang Nam and SHB Da Nang
2	Southeast	Becamex Binh Duong and Ho Chi Minh City
1	Central Highlands	Hoang Anh Gia Lai

== Personnel and kits ==
Note: Flags indicate national team as has been defined under FIFA eligibility rules. Players may hold more than one non-FIFA nationality.

Team	Manager	Captain	Kit manufacturer	Shirt sponsor
Becamex Binh Duong	(Vietnam) Nguyễn Anh Đức	(Vietnam) Nguyễn Tiến Linh	(Vietnam) Kamito	(Vietnam) Becamex^{1}
Cong An Hanoi	(Brazil) Alexandré Pölking	(Vietnam) Nguyễn Quang Hải	(Vietnam) CA Sports	(Vietnam) Hanoi Police Force^{1}
Dong A Thanh Hoa	(Croatia) Tomislav Steinbrückner	(Vietnam) Doãn Ngọc Tân	(Japan) Jogarbola	(Thailand) Casper Electric^{1}
Haiphong	(Vietnam) Chu Đình Nghiêm	(Vietnam) Triệu Việt Hưng	(Italy) Kappa	(England) Mansion Sports^{1} (Vietnam) LPBank^{2}
Hanoi FC	(Japan) Makoto Teguramori	(Vietnam) Nguyễn Văn Quyết	(Japan) Jogarbola	(Vietnam) T&T Homes^{1} (Vietnam) Vinawind^{2} (Vietnam) Quảng Ninh Port^{2} (Vietnam) SHS^{2}
Ho Chi Minh City	(Vietnam) Phùng Thanh Phương	(Slovakia) Patrik Le Giang	(Japan) Jogarbola	(England) Mansion Sports^{1} (Vietnam) Phú Hưng Life Insurance^{1} (Vietnam) Phú Hưng Securities^{2}
Hoang Anh Gia Lai	(Vietnam) Lê Quang Trãi	(Vietnam) Trần Minh Vương	(Vietnam) Kamito	(Thailand) Carabao^{1} (Vietnam) LPBank^{1} ^{2}
Hong Linh Ha Tinh	(Vietnam) Nguyễn Thành Công	(Vietnam) Nguyễn Trọng Hoàng	(Thailand) Grand Sport	(Vietnam) Sao Vàng Beer^{1}
Quang Nam	(Vietnam) Văn Sỹ Sơn	(Vietnam) Ngân Văn Đại	(Spain) Kelme	
Quy Nhon Binh Dinh	(Vietnam) Trần Minh Chiến	(Vietnam) Cao Văn Triền	(Vietnam) Kamito	(Vietnam) MerryLand Quy Nhơn^{1}
SHB Da Nang	(Vietnam) Lê Đức Tuấn	(Vietnam) Đặng Anh Tuấn	(Vietnam) Kamito	(Vietnam) SHB^{1} (Vietnam) 389 Corporation^{2} (Japan) Murata^{2}
Song Lam Nghe An	(Vietnam) Phan Như Thuật	(Nigeria) Michael Olaha	(Vietnam) Kamito	(Vietnam) Sao Vàng Beer^{1} (Vietnam) A An Rice^{1} (Vietnam) EuroSun^{2} (Japan) Nikkokutrust^{2}
Thep Xanh Nam Dinh	(Vietnam) Vũ Hồng Việt	(Vietnam) Trần Nguyên Mạnh	(England) Mitre	(Vietnam) Xuân Thiện Steel^{1} (Vietnam) Xuân Thành Cement^{2}
The Cong–Viettel	(Bulgaria) Velizar Popov	(Vietnam) Bùi Tiến Dũng	(China) Li-Ning	(Vietnam) Thể Công–Viettel^{1} (Vietnam) TV360^{2}

Notes:

1. On the front of shirt.
2. On the back of shirt.

=== Managerial changes ===
Team	Outgoing manager	Manner of departure	Date of vacancy	Position in table	Incoming manager	Date of appointment
Becamex Binh Duong	(Vietnam) Nguyễn Đức Cảnh	Interim period ended	30 June 2024	Pre-season	(Vietnam) Hoàng Anh Tuấn	4 July 2024
Hanoi FC	(Japan) Daiki Iwamasa	Resigned	8 July 2024	Pre-season	(Vietnam) Lê Đức Tuấn	28 July 2024
Hoang Anh Gia Lai	(Vietnam) Vũ Tiến Thành	Appointed as technical director	9 September 2024	Pre-season	(Vietnam) Lê Quang Trãi	9 September 2024
SHB Da Nang	(Vietnam) Trương Việt Hoàng	Appointed as technical director	9 September 2024	Pre-season	(Vietnam) Đào Quang Hùng	9 September 2024
Song Lam Nghe An	(Vietnam) Phạm Anh Tuấn	Resigned	11 November 2024	14th	(Vietnam) Phan Như Thuật	11 November 2024
SHB Da Nang	(Vietnam) Đào Quang Hùng	Demoted to youth team	2 December 2024	14th	(Brazil) Cristiano Roland	3 December 2024
Becamex Binh Duong	(Vietnam) Hoàng Anh Tuấn	Mutual consent	9 December 2024	8th	(Vietnam) Nguyễn Công Mạnh	11 December 2024
SHB Da Nang	(Brazil) Cristiano Roland	Appointed as technical director	10 January 2025	14th	(Vietnam) Phan Thanh Hùng	10 January 2025
Hanoi FC	(Vietnam) Lê Đức Tuấn	Sacked	28 January 2025	4th	(Vietnam) Hoàng Văn Phúc (interim)	28 January 2025
SHB Da Nang	(Vietnam) Phan Thanh Hùng	Appointed as technical director	1 February 2025	14th	(Vietnam) Lê Đức Tuấn	1 February 2025
Hanoi FC	(Vietnam) Hoàng Văn Phúc	Interim period ended	17 February 2025	4th	(Japan) Makoto Teguramori	17 February 2025
Dong A Thanh Hoa	(Bulgaria) Velizar Popov	Resigned	5 March 2025	3rd	(Vietnam) Mai Xuân Hợp (interim)	6 March 2025
Dong A Thanh Hoa	(Vietnam) Mai Xuân Hợp	Interim period ended	24 March 2025	4th	(Croatia) Tomislav Steinbrückner	24 March 2025
The Cong-Viettel	(Vietnam) Nguyễn Đức Thắng	Appointed as technical director	26 April 2025	3rd	(Bulgaria) Velizar Popov	27 April 2025
Becamex Binh Duong	(Vietnam) Nguyễn Công Mạnh	Resigned	7 May 2025	8th	(Vietnam) Nguyễn Anh Đức	7 May 2025
Quy Nhon Binh Dinh	(Vietnam) Bùi Đoàn Quang Huy	Resigned	11 May 2025	13th	(Vietnam) Trần Minh Chiến	11 May 2025

Notes

1. AFC Pro License: These managers were not allowed to be registered as team manager as they did not have the AFC Professional Coaching Diploma

== Foreign players ==
Teams are allowed to register 3 foreign players and will be allotted two extra slot for 2 unnaturalized overseas Vietnamese player that will not be counted against their foreign player allotment. Dong A Thanh Hoa, Cong An Hanoi and Thep Xanh Nam Dinh will be allowed to register 2 additional foreign players as they will compete in AFC and AFF competitions. Therefore, they are only allowed to field maximum 3 foreign players during a league game.

Players name in bold indicates the player was registered after the start of the season.

Club	Player 1	Player 2	Player 3	Player 4 (Unnaturalized Vietnamese player)	Player 5 (Unnaturalized Vietnamese player)	Player 6 (AFC and AFF competitions)	Player 7 (AFC and AFF competitions)	Unregistred / Former players
Becamex Binh Duong	(Brazil) Janclesio	(Ivory Coast) **Cheick Timité**	(Kyrgyzstan) Odilzhon Abdurakhmanov					(Brazil) Wellington Nem (Cameroon) Mathias Malep
Cong An Hanoi	(Brazil) Léo Artur	(Brazil) Hugo Gomes	(Brazil) Alan Grafite			(Brazil) **Tháileon**	(Brazil) Vitão	
Dong A Thanh Hoa	(Brazil) Luiz Antônio	(Brazil) Gustavo	(Brazil) Yago Ramos	(Laos) **Damoth Thongkhamsavath**		(Brazil) Ribamar	(Brazil) Igor Salatiel	(Jamaica) Rimario Gordon (South Korea) Kim Won-sik
Haiphong	(Brazil) Lucão	(Haiti) Bicou Bissainthe	(Nigeria) **Fred Friday**	(United States) **Mark Huynh**				(Brazil) Zé Paulo (Haiti) Miche-Naider Chéry
Hanoi FC	(Brazil) **Daniel Passira**	(Croatia) **Luka Bobičanec**	(Guinea-Bissau) João Pedro	(Canada) **Pierre Lamothe**	(United States) Kyle Colonna			(Netherlands) Keziah Veendorp (Nigeria) Augustine Chidi Kwem (Uzbekistan) Jahongir Abdumominov
Ho Chi Minh City	(Brazil) Matheus Duarte	(Brazil) **João Pedro**	(Malaysia) Endrick	(Slovakia) Patrik Le Giang	(United States) Zan Nguyen			(Brazil) Patryck Ferreira (Estonia) Erik Sorga
Hoang Anh Gia Lai	(Brazil) **Washington Brandão**	(Brazil) Jairo	(Brazil) Marciel					(Brazil) Jeferson Elías
Hong Linh Ha Tinh	(Brazil) Geovane	(Brazil) Helerson	(Democratic Republic of the Congo) Noel Mbo	(France) Leygley Adou				(Nigeria) Alhaji Gero
Quang Nam	(Cameroon) Alain Eyenga	(Nigeria) Charles Atshimene	(Nigeria) **Ugochukwu Oduenyi**					(Brazil) Jacó (Brazil) Hyuri
Quy Nhon Binh Dinh	(Brazil) **Zé Paulo**	(Colombia) **Rodrigo Rivas**	(Colombia) Luis Salazar					(Brazil) Alisson Farias (Brazil) Léo (Brazil) Gabriel Morbeck
SHB Da Nang	(Brazil) **Thiago Henrique**	(Brazil) **Cássio Scheid**	(Brazil) **Emerson Souza**					(Brazil) Werick Caetano (Brazil) Yuri Mamute (Brazil) Marlon Rangel
Song Lam Nghe An	(Nigeria) Benjamin Kuku	(Nigeria) Michael Olaha	(Paraguay) Sebastián Zaracho					
The Cong-Viettel	(Brazil) Amarildo	(Brazil) Pedro Henrique	(Brazil) Wesley Natã					(Brazil) Patrick Gama
Thep Xanh Nam Dinh	(Brazil) Lucas Alves	(Brazil) **Brenner**	(Brazil) Caio César	(France) **Kevin Pham Ba**		(Brazil) **Rômulo**	(Uganda) Joseph Mpande	(Brazil) China (Brazil) Hêndrio (Brazil) Lucas Silva (Brazil) Wálber (Nigeria) Moses Odo

=== Dual nationality Vietnamese players ===
- Players name in **bold** indicates the player was registered after the start of the season.
- Player's name in italics indicates Overseas Vietnamese players whom have obtained a Vietnamese passport and citizenship, therefore being considered as local players.

Club	Player 1	Player 2
Becamex Binh Duong	(Uganda) (Vietnam) Trần Trung Hiếu	
Cong An Hanoi	(Czech Republic) (Vietnam) Nguyễn Filip^{1}	(France) (Vietnam) Cao Pendant Quang Vinh^{1}
Dong A Thanh Hoa	(Jamaica) Rimario Gordon^{2}	
Haiphong		
Hanoi FC		
Ho Chi Minh City	(Germany) (Vietnam) Bùi Đức Duy^{1}	
Hoang Anh Gia Lai		
Hong Linh Ha Tinh	(Russia) (Vietnam) Lê Khắc Viktor	
Quang Nam	(Nigeria) (Vietnam) Hoàng Vũ Samson	
Quy Nhon Binh Dinh	(Czech Republic) (Vietnam) Mạc Hồng Quân^{1}	(Czech Republic) (Vietnam) Dương Thanh Tùng
SHB Da Nang		
Song Lam Nghe An		
The Cong-Viettel		
Thep Xanh Nam Dinh	(Brazil) (Vietnam) Nguyễn Xuân Son^{1}	

Notes:

^1 Capped for Vietnam national team.
^2 Player is under the process of Vietnamese naturalization, thus is not counted as a foreign player slot.

== Standings ==
=== League table ===
Pos	Team	Pld	W	D	L	GF	GA	GD	Pts	Qualification or relegation
1	Thep Xanh Nam Dinh (C)	26	17	6	3	51	18	+33	57	Qualification for the AFC Champions League Two group stage and ASEAN Club Championship group stage
2	Hanoi FC	26	14	7	5	46	25	+21	49	
3	Cong An Hanoi	26	12	9	5	45	23	+22	45	Qualification for the AFC Champions League Two group stage and ASEAN Club Championship group stage (Note: Cong An Hanoi qualified for the AFC Champions League Two group stage and ASEAN Club Championship group stage as the 2024–25 Vietnamese Cup winners.)
4	The Cong-Viettel	26	12	8	6	43	29	+14	44	
5	Hong Linh Ha Tinh	26	7	15	4	24	20	+4	36	
6	Haiphong	26	9	8	9	29	27	+2	35	
7	Becamex Binh Duong	26	9	5	12	31	40	−9	32	
8	Dong A Thanh Hoa	26	7	10	9	32	33	−1	31	
9	Hoang Anh Gia Lai	26	7	8	11	34	41	−7	29	
10	Ho Chi Minh City	26	6	10	10	19	36	−17	28	
11	Quang Nam (D)	26	5	11	10	27	36	−9	26	Dissolved
12	Song Lam Nghe An	26	5	11	10	22	36	−14	26	
13	SHB Da Nang (O)	26	5	10	11	24	42	−18	25	Qualification for the relegation play-offs
14	Quy Nhon Binh Dinh (R)	26	5	6	15	22	43	−21	21	Relegation to V.League 2

Source: VPF
Rules for classification: 1) Points; 2) Head-to-head points; 3) Head-to-head goal difference; 4) Head-to-head goals scored; 5) Goal difference; 6) Goals scored; 7) Away goals scored; 8) Disciplinary points.
(C) Champions; (D) Disqualified; (O) Play-off winners; (R) Relegated

=== Results ===
Home \ Away	BBD	DTH	HPG	HAN	HNP	HCM	HGL	HHT	QNA	QBD	SDN	SNA	TCV	TND
Becamex Binh Duong	—	1–0	1–1	0–3	1–3	3–0	4–1	2–2	0–0	2–1	1–1	2–1	1–2	1–4
Dong A Thanh Hoa	1–2	—	3–1	1–1	1–4	1–2	2–2	1–1	1–1	1–1	1–0	1–1	3–1	1–1
Haiphong	4–2	2–1	—	0–0	1–1	2–0	2–0	1–0	0–1	2–0	1–0	0–0	2–3	1–2
Hanoi FC	1–0	3–1	2–2	—	1–1	5–1	0–1	1–1	2–1	1–0	3–2	3–0	1–2	0–3
Cong An Hanoi	1–0	0–1	2–0	0–2	—	0–0	3–1	0–0	4–4	3–0	3–0	1–1	2–1	1–1
Ho Chi Minh City	0–2	2–2	0–2	0–2	2–1	—	1–0	0–1	0–0	1–0	1–0	1–1	0–0	0–3
Hoang Anh Gia Lai	4–0	1–1	1–0	0–3	1–0	2–2	—	0–1	3–3	1–1	2–2	2–0	2–1	0–0
Hong Linh Ha Tinh	3–1	0–0	1–1	1–1	0–0	1–1	1–0	—	0–0	0–0	2–2	0–1	2–2	1–0
Quang Nam	1–2	1–0	1–2	1–1	0–3	3–1	0–4	2–0	—	1–2	3–2	1–1	0–0	0–2
Quy Nhon Binh Dinh	0–1	1–4	1–0	2–4	1–5	1–2	2–1	0–1	1–0	—	1–2	2–2	2–2	0–0
SHB Da Nang	1–1	1–0	0–0	0–2	1–2	1–1	1–1	1–3	1–0	3–1	—	2–1	1–1	0–0
Song Lam Nghe An	1–0	0–1	1–0	1–2	1–1	0–0	3–2	1–1	1–1	1–0	0–0	—	0–5	2–3
The Cong-Viettel	1–0	1–2	2–2	2–1	2–1	2–0	2–1	1–1	2–2	0–1	6–0	1–0	—	0–2
Thep Xanh Nam Dinh	3–1	2–1	2–0	2–1	0–3	1–1	6–1	1–0	1–0	3–1	5–0	4–1	0–1	—

Source: VPF
Legend: Blue = home team win; Yellow = draw; Red = away team win.

=== Position by round ===
Team ╲ Round	1	2	3	4	5	6	7	8	9	10	11	12	13	14	15	16	17	18	19	20	21	22	23	24	25	26
Thep Xanh Nam Dinh	13	8	8	5	8	6	2	2	2	2	2	1	2	1	1	1	1	1	1	1	1	1	1	1	1	1
Quy Nhon Binh Dinh	12	13	10	11	11	11	9	9	9	10	10	10	11	12	12	13	13	13	13	13	13	13	13	13	14	14
Hanoi FC	3	6	4	6	6	8	8	4	6	4	4	4	4	4	2	3	2	2	2	2	2	2	2	2	2	2
Ho Chi Minh City	9	4	9	10	10	10	11	10	10	11	9	9	10	10	8	10	11	10	9	10	9	10	10	11	9	10
The Cong-Viettel	10	5	7	7	2	3	4	6	3	3	3	3	1	2	4	2	3	3	4	3	3	3	3	3	4	4
Cong An Hanoi	5	10	6	8	5	1	6	8	5	6	7	8	8	6	6	6	5	4	5	6	5	5	5	5	3	3
Haiphong	6	9	12	12	12	13	12	13	12	12	13	12	13	11	9	8	9	9	8	8	7	7	6	6	6	6
Becamex Binh Duong	2	3	5	4	7	4	5	7	8	7	8	6	6	5	5	5	7	7	7	7	8	9	9	8	8	7
Dong A Thanh Hoa	11	7	3	1	1	2	1	1	1	1	1	2	3	3	3	4	4	5	3	5	6	6	7	7	7	8
Quang Nam	14	14	11	9	9	9	10	11	11	9	11	11	9	9	11	9	10	11	11	11	11	11	12	10	12	11
Hoang Anh Gia Lai	1	1	1	2	3	7	3	5	7	8	6	7	7	8	10	11	8	8	10	9	10	8	8	9	10	9
Song Lam Nghe An	8	12	13	14	14	12	14	12	13	13	12	13	12	13	13	12	12	12	12	12	12	12	11	12	11	12
Hong Linh Ha Tinh	4	2	2	3	4	5	7	3	4	5	5	5	5	7	7	7	6	6	6	4	4	4	4	4	5	5
SHB Da Nang	7	11	14	13	13	14	13	14	14	14	14	14	14	14	14	14	14	14	14	14	14	14	14	14	13	13

Champion and qualification to the 2025–26 AFC Champions League Two group stage
Qualification for relegation play-offs
Relegation to 2025–26 V.League 2

Source: VPF

== Promotion/relegation play-offs ==
The 2024–25 season ended with a promotion/relegation play-off game between the 13th-placed V.League 1 team, SHB Da Nang and the V.League 2 runner-up, Truong Tuoi Binh Phuoc, took place on 27 June 2025.

27 June 2025
18:00

SHB Da Nang	2–0	Truong Tuoi Binh Phuoc
Phạm Đình Duy 68'; Hà Minh Tuấn 82'	Report

Thống Nhất Stadium, Ho Chi Minh City
Attendance: 14,000
Referee: Razlan Joffri Ali (Malaysia)

SHB Da Nang won 2–0 and therefore both teams remained in their respective leagues.

== Statistics ==
=== Top scorers ===
Rank	Player	Club	Goals
1	(Brazil) Lucão do Break	Haiphong	14
1	(Brazil) Alan Grafite	Cong An Hanoi	14
3	(Brazil) Pedro Henrique	The Cong-Viettel	13
3	(Vietnam) Nguyễn Tiến Linh	Becamex Binh Duong	13
5	(Brazil) Ribamar	Dong A Thanh Hoa	12
6	(Nigeria) Charles Atshimene	Quang Nam	11
7	(Brazil) Léo Artur	Cong An Hanoi	10
8	(Guinea-Bissau) João Pedro	Hanoi FC	9
9	(Vietnam) Nguyễn Xuân Son	Thep Xanh Nam Dinh	7
9	(Vietnam) Nguyễn Văn Quyết	Hanoi FC	7
9	(Brazil) Daniel Passira	Hanoi FC	7

=== Hat-tricks ===
Player	For	Against	Result	Date
(Brazil) Geovane Magno	Hong Linh Ha Tinh	SHB Da Nang	3–1 (A)	22 September 2024
(Vietnam) Nguyễn Xuân Son	Thep Xanh Nam Dinh	Becamex Binh Duong	4–1 (A)	20 November 2024
(Brazil) Alan Grafite	Cong An Hanoi	Quang Nam	4–4 (H)	15 February 2025
(Brazil) Ribamar	Dong A Thanh Hoa	The Cong-Viettel	3–1 (H)	19 April 2025

== Attendances ==
=== Overall attendance ===
Home	Away														Attendance	
Home	BBD	DTH	HPG	HAN	HNP	HCM	HGL	HHT	QNA	QBD	SDN	SNA	TCV	TND	Total	Average
Becamex Binh Duong	—N/a	4,000	4,500	4,200	4,500	3,000	4,200	4,500	3,500	3,000	2,000	6,000	4,000	7,500	55,900	4,300
Dong A Thanh Hoa	4,000	—N/a	4,500	7,000	5,000	2,500	4,000	2,000	4,000	1,000	7,000	2,000	2,500	6,000	51,500	3,961
Haiphong	6,200	7,000	—N/a	9,500	9,500	5,000	8,000	6,000	5,000	6,800	8,500	6,500	5,000	6,000	89,000	6,846
Hanoi FC	2,000	5,500	7,000	—N/a	8,000	900	3,000	1,000	5,000	4,000	5,000	5,000	5,000	14,000	65,400	5,030
Cong An Hanoi	3,000	7,000	5,600	9,000	—N/a	6,300	6,500	7,500	3,500	6,000	8,600	3,000	8,000	13,600	87,600	6,738
Ho Chi Minh City	5,000	4,000	3,000	5,000	5,000	—N/a	6,000	3,000	3,000	7,000	3,000	3,000	4,000	6,000	57,000	4,384
Hoang Anh Gia Lai	2,500	6,000	4,000	4,000	7,000	5,000	—N/a	4,000	5,000	6,000	4,000	7,000	3,500	7,000	65,000	5,000
Hong Linh Ha Tinh	4,000	4,000	2,500	3,000	4,000	4,500	5,000	—N/a	5,000	4,500	3,500	4,000	6,000	4,000	54,000	4,153
Quang Nam	9,000	5,000	5,000	1,500	5,000	4,000	2,500	2,500	—N/a	4,000	5,000	1,500	2,000	7,500	54,500	4,192
Quy Nhon Binh Dinh	3,000	2,000	2,000	3,000	10,000	4,000	2,000	1,500	2,000	—N/a	2,000	1,000	8,000	2,000	42,500	3,269
SHB Da Nang	4,000	1,500	4,000	1,600	5,000	1,500	5,000	4,000	6,000	3,500	—N/a	5,000	2,500	4,000	47,600	3,661
Song Lam Nghe An	5,000	2,500	4,500	6,000	5,500	5,000	8,500	5,000	5,000	3,000	7,000	—N/a	2,500	4,500	64,000	4,923
The Cong-Viettel	4,500	6,000	5,500	4,500	6,500	4,000	3,000	5,000	3,500	5,000	4,000	6,500	—N/a	9,500	67,500	5,192
Thep Xanh Nam Dinh	8,000	20,000	8,000	10,000	7,000	7,000	22,000	25,000	8,000	7,500	8,000	7,000	6,000	—N/a	143,500	11,038
Total League Attendance															945,000	5,192

Source: VPF

== Awards ==
=== Monthly awards ===
Month	Club of the Month	Manager of the Month		Player of the Month		Goal of the Month	
Month	Club of the Month	Manager	Club	Player	Club	Player	Club
September	Dong A Thanh Hoa	(Bulgaria) Velizar Popov	Dong A Thanh Hoa	(Brazil) Geovane Magno	Hong Linh Ha Tinh	(Vietnam) Nguyễn Hai Long	Hanoi FC
November-January	Thep Xanh Nam Dinh	(Vietnam) Vũ Hồng Việt	Thep Xanh Nam Dinh	(Vietnam) Nguyễn Xuân Son	Thep Xanh Nam Dinh	(Vietnam) Bùi Ngọc Long	Ho Chi Minh City
March	Haiphong	(Vietnam) Chu Đình Nghiêm	Haiphong	(Vietnam) Nguyễn Tiến Linh	Becamex Binh Duong	(Vietnam) Nguyễn Phong Hồng Duy	Thep Xanh Nam Dinh
April	Hanoi FC	(Japan) Makoto Teguramori	Hanoi FC	(Brazil) Daniel Passira	Hanoi FC	(Vietnam) Nguyễn Hữu Thắng	The Cong-Viettel
May	Thep Xanh Nam Dinh	(Vietnam) Vũ Hồng Việt	Thep Xanh Nam Dinh	(Brazil) Brenner Marlos	Thep Xanh Nam Dinh	(Vietnam) Nguyễn Văn Quyết	Hanoi FC

=== Annual awards ===
Award	Winner	Club
Manager of the Year	(Vietnam) Vũ Hồng Việt	Thep Xanh Nam Dinh
Player of the Year	(Brazil) Alan Grafite	Cong An Hanoi
Best Young Player	(Vietnam) Lê Văn Thuận	Dong A Thanh Hoa
Goal of the Year	(Vietnam) Nguyễn Hữu Thắng	The Cong-Viettel

Best XI
Goalkeeper	(Vietnam) Nguyễn Đình Triệu (Haiphong)			
Defenders	(Vietnam) Bùi Tiến Dũng (The Cong-Viettel)	(France) Leygley Adou (Hong Linh Ha Tinh)	(Vietnam) Nguyễn Thành Chung (Hanoi FC)	(Vietnam) Cao Pendant Quang Vinh (Cong An Hanoi)
Midfielders	(Vietnam) Nguyễn Hai Long (Hanoi FC)	(Brazil) Caio César (Thep Xanh Nam Dinh)	(Vietnam) Nguyễn Quang Hải (Cong An Hanoi)	(Vietnam) Nguyễn Văn Vĩ (Thep Xanh Nam Dinh)
Forwards	(Brazil) Alan Grafite (Cong An Hanoi)		(Vietnam) Nguyễn Tiến Linh (Becamex Binh Duong)	
