= 1999–2000 V-League =

Vietnamese National First Division
- Season: 1999–2000
- Dates: 24 October 1999 – 7 May 2000
- Champions: Sông Lam Nghệ An (1st title)
- Relegated: Đà Nẵng; Lâm Đồng; Long An; Vĩnh Long
- Asian Club Championship: Sông Lam Nghệ An
- Asian Cup Winners' Cup: Cảng Sài Gòn
- Matches: 156
- Goals: 370 (2.37 per match)
- Top goalscorer: Văn Sỹ Thủy (14 goals)

The 1999–2000 Vietnamese National First Division was the 17th season of the National Football Championship in Vietnam, played from 24 October 1999 until 7 May 2000.

== Standings ==
Pos	Team	Pld	W	D	L	GF	GA	GD	Pts	Qualification
1	Sông Lam Nghệ An (C)	24	11	10	3	35	20	+15	43	Qualification to Asian Club Championship and V-League
2	Công An TP.HCM	24	12	6	6	40	27	+13	42	Qualification to V-League
3	Công An Hà Nội	24	10	7	7	25	22	+3	37	Qualification to V-League
4	Cảng Sài Gòn	24	9	8	7	38	30	+8	35	Qualification to Asian Cup Winners' Cup and V-League
5	Đồng Tháp	24	9	7	8	27	23	+4	34	Qualification to V-League
6	Nam Định	24	9	7	8	23	25	−2	34	Qualification to V-League
7	Thừa Thiên Huế	24	9	5	10	30	29	+1	32	Qualification to V-League
8	Công An Hải Phòng	24	8	7	9	20	20	0	31	Qualification to V-League
9	Khánh Hòa	24	9	4	11	33	35	−2	31	Qualification to V-League
10	Thể Công	24	7	9	8	27	28	−1	30	Qualification to V-League
11	Đà Nẵng	24	6	9	9	23	30	−7	27	Relegation to First Division (Note: From the 2000–01 season, the first tier became the V-League, and the second tier, then known as the Second Division, was renamed to the First Division.)
12	Long An	24	6	7	11	27	39	−12	25	Relegation to First Division
13	Lâm Đồng	24	6	4	14	22	42	−20	22	Relegation to First Division
14	Vĩnh Long	0	0	0	0	0	0	0	0	Demote to Second Division (Note: Vĩnh Long was expelled from the league after the team's players and staffs assaulted the referee during Matchday 14. As the result, all Vĩnh Long's previous results were annulled.)

Source: VFF
(C) Champions
