= 2000–01 Vietnamese First Division =

2000–01 Vietnam First Division
Tournament details
- Country: Vietnam
- Date: 22 November 2000 – 23 May 2001
- Teams: 12

Final positions
- Champions: Binh Dinh
- Runners-up: Da Nang
- Third place: Hai Quan

Tournament statistics
- Matches played: 132
- Goals scored: 359 (2.72 per match)
- Top goal scorer(s): Tran Tan Loi (An Giang) (13 goals)

Awards
- Best player: Pham Hung Dung (Da Nang)

2000–01 Vietnam First Division is the fifth season of the Vietnam First Division established by the Vietnam Football Federation in 1997.

== Background ==
This is the first season of the First Division after being split into two separate leagues, with the V.League 1 being the top level and the Vietnam First Division being the second level. Previously, the Vietnam First Division was the highest level tournament in the football tournament system in Vietnam from 1997 until the end of the 1999–2000 season. This season, 12 teams will compete in a double round-robin to determine two promoted teams in the V.League 1 and two teams relegated to the 2002 Vietnamese Football League Second Division.

Binh Dinh won the tournament after defeating An Giang with a very large score of 9–2 right at home in the final match.

== Teams ==
=== Stadiums ===
Team	Location	Stadium	Capacity
An Giang	Long Xuyên, An Giang	An Giang	15,000
Asia Commercial Bank	Dong Da, Ha Noi	Ha Noi	20,000
Binh Duong	Thu Dau Mot, Binh Duong	Go Dau	25,000
Binh Dinh	Quy Nhon, Binh Dinh	Quy Nhon	10,000
Da Nang	Hai Chau, Da Nang	Chi Lang	25,000
Gia Lai	Pleiku, Gia Lai	Pleiku	23,000
Hai Quan	District 10, Ho Chi Minh City	Thong Nhat	22,000
Lam Dong	Da Lat, Lam Dong	Da Lat	10,000
Long An	Tan An, Long An	Long An	20,000
Quan Khu 7	Tan Binh, Ho Chi Minh City	Quan Khu 7	20,000
Quang Ninh	Ha Long, Quang Ninh	Hon Gai	
Tien Giang	My Tho, Tien Giang	Tien Giang	10,000

=== Personnel and sponsoring ===
Team	Manager	Captain	Kit manufacturer	Main sponsor (on kit)
An Giang	(Vietnam) Ho Van Thu			
Asia Commercial Bank	(Vietnam) Le Khac Chinh			
Binh Duong	(Vietnam) Le Duc Tri	(Vietnam) Truong Van Du		
Binh Dinh	(Vietnam) Le Thanh Huy			
Da Nang	(Vietnam) Tran Vu			
Gia Lai				
Hai Quan	(Vietnam) Le Huu Truong	(Vietnam) Trinh Van Thien		
Lam Dong	(Vietnam) Dinh Xuan Thanh			
Long An	(Vietnam) Huynh Ngoc Sang			
Quan Khu 7	(Vietnam) Nguyen Kim Hang			
Quang Ninh				
Tien Giang				

=== Managerial changes ===
Team	Outgoing manager	Manner of departure	Date of vacancy	Table	Replacement manager	Date of appointment
Binh Duong	(Vietnam) Luu Mong Hung	Sacked	March 17, 2001	12th	(Vietnam) Le Duc Tri	March 17, 2001
An Giang	(Vietnam) Ho Van Thu	Resigned	May 3, 2001			

=== Foreign players ===
Team	Player 1	Player 2	Player 3
An Giang	(Ivory Coast) Ibrahim	(Cameroon) Koyu Hubert	
Asia Commercial Bank	(Nigeria) Ajeboh Golden	(Russia) Alexei Mozalevski	(Russia) Andrei Bulanov
Binh Duong			
Binh Dinh	(Nigeria) Blessing Ughojo	(Nigeria) Gaston Daniel	
Da Nang	(Australia) Russell Miner	(Australia) James Johnson	(Australia) Wade Baldwin
Gia Lai			
Hai Quan			
Lam Dong			
Long An	(Brazil) Fabio Santos		
Quan Khu 7			
Quang Ninh	(England) Barry Guildford		
Tien Giang			

== League table ==
Pos	Team	Pld	W	D	L	GF	GA	GD	Pts	Promotion or relegation
1	Da Nang (P)	22	12	8	2	40	16	+24	44	Promotion to V-League
2	Binh Dinh (P)	22	13	5	4	46	25	+21	44	Promotion to V-League
3	Hai Quan	22	12	8	2	33	18	+15	44	
4	Quân khu 7	22	9	8	5	34	21	+13	35	
5	Gia Lai	22	9	4	9	26	20	+6	31	
6	Tien Giang	22	8	5	9	31	30	+1	29	
7	Long An	22	7	6	9	31	31	0	27	
8	Lam Dong	22	7	4	11	27	37	−10	25	
9	Asia Commercial Bank	22	5	9	8	19	24	−5	24	
10	Binh Duong	22	5	8	9	27	33	−6	23	
11	An Giang (R)	22	4	5	13	34	59	−25	17	Relegation to Vietnamese Second Division
12	Than Quang Ninh (R)	22	2	8	12	11	45	−34	14	Relegation to Vietnamese Second Division

Source: RSSSF
Rules for classification: 1) Points; 2) Head-to-head points; 3) Head-to-head goal difference; 4) Head-to-head goals scored; 5) Goal difference; 6) Goals scored; 7) Away goals scored; 8) Fair-play points.
(P) Promoted; (R) Relegated
