= 2011 Vietnamese National Football First League =

V.League 2
- Season: 2011
- Dates: 20 January – 20 August
- Champions: Sài Gòn Xuân Thành
- Runner up: Kienlongbank Kiên Giang
- Relegated: Mikado Nam Định; Huda Huế
- Matches: 182
- Goals: 519 (2.85 per match)
- Top goalscorer: Christian Nsi Amougou

The 2011 Vietnamese National Football First League season was the 17th season of Vietnam's professional football league and began in January 2011 and finish in August 2011.

== Teams ==
=== Stadia and locations ===
Club	Based	Home stadium	Capacity	Manager
An Đô-An Giang	Long Xuyên	Long Xuyên Stadium	10,000	(Vietnam) Nhan Thiện Nhân
SQC Bình Định	Qui Nhơn	Quy Nhon Stadium	25,000	(Vietnam) Phan Tôn Quyền
TDC Bình Dương	Thủ Dầu Một	Gò Đậu Stadium	18,250	(Vietnam) Nguyễn Minh Dũng
XSKT Cần Thơ	Cần Thơ	Cần Thơ Stadium	50,000	(Vietnam) Huỳnh Ngọc San
Berjaya Đồng Nai	Biên Hòa	Biên Hòa Stadium	5,000	(Vietnam) Trần Bình Sự
Đồng Tâm Long An	Tân An	Long An Stadium	19,975	(Croatia) Buketa Ranko
Trẻ Hà Nội T&T	Hanoi	Hàng Đẫy Stadium	22,500	(Vietnam) Hoàng Văn Phúc
Hà Nội ACB	Hanoi	Hàng Đẫy Stadium	22,000	(Argentina) Mauricio Alejandro Alvarez
Thành phố Hồ Chí Minh	Ho Chi Minh City	Thống Nhất Stadium	25,000	(Croatia) Vjeran Simunić
Huda Huế	Huế	Tu Do Stadium	20,000	(Vietnam) Nguyễn Đức Dũng
Mikado Nam Định	Nam Định	Thiên Trường Stadium	30,000	(Vietnam) Nguyễn Ngọc Hảo
BHTS Quảng Nam	Tam Kỳ	Quảng Nam Stadium	15,624	(Vietnam) Nguyễn Mạnh Cường
Than Quảng Ninh	Hạ Long	Lam Son Stadium	5,000	(Vietnam) Đinh Cao Nghĩa
Tây Ninh	Tây Ninh	Tây Ninh Stadium	20,000	(Vietnam) Phạm Anh Tuấn

== League table ==
Pos	Team	Pld	W	D	L	GF	GA	GD	Pts	Promotion or relegation
1	Xuân Thành Sài Gòn (C, P)	26	15	9	2	65	35	+30	54	Promotion to 2012 V-League
2	Kienlongbank Kiên Giang (P)	26	12	11	3	44	26	+18	47	Promotion to 2012 V-League
3	Bình Định	26	13	6	7	31	18	+13	45	
4	Than Quảng Ninh	26	11	9	6	45	37	+8	42	
5	Hùng Vương An Giang	26	11	4	11	46	46	0	37	
6	XSKT Cần Thơ	26	11	3	12	33	42	−9	36	
7	Đồng Nai	26	9	9	8	34	35	−1	36	
8	Trẻ Hà Nội T&T	26	8	9	9	38	38	0	33	
9	QNK Quảng Nam	26	7	9	10	30	33	−3	30	
10	TDC Bình Dương	26	7	7	12	32	43	−11	28	
11	Thành phố Hồ Chí Minh	26	6	10	10	29	36	−7	28	
12	XM Fico Tây Ninh	26	7	6	13	34	38	−4	27	
13	Nam Định (R)	26	5	12	9	29	41	−12	27	Relegation to 2012 Vietnamese Second Division
14	Huda Huế (R)	26	4	8	14	31	51	−20	20	Relegation to 2012 Vietnamese Second Division

Source: Vietnamese First Division
Rules for classification: 1) points; 2) goal difference; 3) number of goals scored.
(C) Champions; (P) Promoted; (R) Relegated
