= Bùi Quang Huy =

Vietnamese footballer (born 1982)

Personal information
- Full name: Bùi Quang Huy
- Date of birth: 24 July 1982 (age 44)
- Place of birth: Thái Thụy, Thái Bình, Vietnam
- Height: 1.78 m (5 ft 10 in)
- Position: Goalkeeper

Youth career
- 1998–2001: Nam Định

Senior career*
| Years | Team | Apps | (Gls) |
| 2001–2009 | Megastar Nam Định | 167 | (0) |
| 2010–2011 | Vicem Hải Phòng | 36 | (0) |
| 2011–2014 | The Vissai Ninh Bình | 48 | (0) |
| Total | | 251 | (0) |

International career
| 2004–2006 | Vietnam U23 | 24 | (0) |
| 2004–2010 | Vietnam | 34 | (0) |
- * Club domestic league appearances and goals

Bùi Quang Huy (born 24 July 1982) is a Vietnamese footballer, playing for club Vicem Hải Phòng as goalkeeper. He was a member of Vietnam national football team.

== Career ==
=== Club ===
Quang Huy came to football about late, not through any formal training. In 1998 (while he was in grade 11), Quang Huy went professional football after joining the youth team of Nam Định. However, with high fitness advantage with skills forged when he was playing at his country helped him to have a position in the first-team squads a few months later. Quang Huy is one of the players talented in ages birth in 1980 of Nam Định. In 2005, after with the national team to attend the 2004 Tiger Cup in late last year, Huy was given the armband of Mikado Nam Định, leading players of the next generation stay in V-League in 5 seasons later. Quang Huy signed a term of 3 years with 30 million salaries/month with Xi măng Hải Phòng in pre-season period 2009-10.

=== National team ===
Quang Huy was first called up to Vietnam national football team preparing for 2004 Tiger Cup. In this competition, he was the reserve goalkeeper for Nguyễn Thế Anh. Then, he was called up to Vietnam national football team to preparing 2007 AFC Asian Cup and 2008 AFF Suzuki Cup, but in these two tournament, he was the reserve goalkeeper for Dương Hồng Sơn.

== Honours ==
Vietnam national football team

- 2007 ASEAN Football Championship: Third-place
- 2008 AFF Suzuki Cup: Champion

Mikado Nam Định

- 2003 V-League: Third-place
- 2004 V-League: Runner-up
- 2007 Vietnamese Cup: Champion

Vicem Hải Phòng

- 2010 V-League: Runner-up
