= 2014 Vietnamese National Football Second League =

Vietnamese National Football Second League
- Season: 2014
- Promoted: Nam Định; Phú Yên; Bình Phước; Công An Nhân Dân

The 2014 Vietnamese National Football Second League was the 14th season of the Vietnamese National Football Second League, held by VFF.

== League stage ==
=== Group A ===
Team	Pld	W	D	L	GF	GA	GD	Pts
Nam Định	4	3	1	0	5	1	+4	10
Công An Nhân Dân	4	1	1	2	3	3	0	4
Viettel	4	1	0	3	1	5	−4	3

=== Group B ===
Team	Pld	W	D	L	GF	GA	GD	Pts
Phú Yên	6	3	1	2	10	8	+2	10
Kon Tum	6	2	3	1	8	7	+1	9
Bình Thuận	6	1	3	2	5	6	−1	6
Lâm Đồng	6	0	5	1	6	7	−1	5

=== Group C ===
Team	Pld	W	D	L	GF	GA	GD	Pts
Bình Phước	6	2	4	0	11	3	+8	10
Long An	6	3	1	2	6	7	−1	10
Trẻ Đồng Nai	6	2	1	3	7	10	−3	7
Thanh niên Sài Gòn	6	1	2	3	3	7	−4	5

=== Group D ===
Team	Pld	W	D	L	GF	GA	GD	Pts
Tiền Giang	6	5	0	1	15	4	+11	15
Vĩnh Long	6	4	0	2	10	7	+3	12
Cà Mau	6	3	0	3	9	10	−1	9
Bến Tre	6	0	0	6	3	16	−13	0

== Final stage ==
17 May 2014
15:30

Nam Định	4-0	Vĩnh Long
Vũ Thế Vương 22', 65'; Nguyễn Hữu Khôi 45', 52'

Tam Kỳ Stadium
Attendance: 2000
Referee: Trần Xuân Nguyện
17 May 2014
18:00

Phú Yên	2-0	Long An
Châu Ngọc Quang 3'; Nguyễn Thành Đồng 81'

Tam Kỳ Stadium
Attendance: 500
Referee: Ngô Đức Việt
19 May 2014
15:30

Bình Phước	4-0	Kon Tum
Bùi Minh Hiệp 33'; Ngô Viết Phú 51'; Bùi Minh Hiệp 67'; Võ Công Thành 68'

Tam Kỳ Stadium
Attendance: 600
Referee: Lê Đức Cảnh
19 May 2014
18:00

Tiền Giang	1-1	Công An Nhân Dân
Dương Minh Thắng 63'		Trần Đình Bảo 87'
Penalties
	3-4

Tam Kỳ Stadium
Attendance: 2000
Referee: Đặng Đức Toàn
