= Thep Xanh Nam Dinh F.C. =

Vietnamese association football club

Nam Định
- Full name: Thép Xanh Nam Định
- Nicknames: "Dũng-Sỹ Thành Nam" (The Steelhearts from the Southern Citadel) "Hào khí Đông-A" (The Sacred Spirit of Dong A)
- Short name: TXNĐ; NĐFC
- Founded: 1965; 61 years ago as Thanh Niên Nam Hà
- Ground: Thiên Trường Stadium
- Capacity: 30,000
- Owner: Xuân-Thiện Group
- Chairman: Nguyễn Tân Anh
- Head coach: Vũ Hồng Việt
- League: V.League 1
- 2025–26: V.League 1, 6th of 14
- Website: nam-dinh-fc.com
| Home colours | Away colours |

Nam Định Football Club (Vietnamese: Câu lạc bộ bóng đá Thép Xanh Nam Định), currently known as Thép Xanh Nam Định due to sponsorship reasons, is a Vietnamese professional football club based in Nam Định ward, Ninh Bình. The club is currently the defending champions of the V.League 1, the highest football division of Vietnam.

Throughout its history, the club has won 3 V.League 1 titles, 1 V.League 2 titles, 1 Third division league title, 1 Vietnamese Cup and 1 Vietnamese Super Cup.

== History ==
=== Early years and first league title (1965–2000) ===
The club was founded in 1965 as Thanh Niên Nam Hà. In 1982, the club changed their name to Công Nghiệp Hà Nam Ninh. The club made its debut in the top division during the 1982–83 season. In 1985, Công Nghiệp Hà Nam Ninh won the National A1 Championship, where the club finished the season unbeaten and their star player Nguyễn Văn Dũng ending the season as the league top scorer with 15 goals.

Following organisational changes in Vietnamese football, the club experienced several name changes and periods of restructuring during the late 1980s and 1990s.

In 1991, Công Nghiệp Hà Nam Ninh became known as Nam Hà before later adopting the name Nam Định in 1997. On 29 November 2000, the club officially adopted the name Nam Định Football Club under a provincial decision. The club continued to compete in the national league and gradually established itself as a competitive side in Vietnamese football.

=== Stability in the top division (2000–2008) ===
Nam Định finished as runners-up in the national league in the 2000–01 season. In 2001, Nam Định took second place in the National Championships, losing to Bình Định.

During this period, the club competed under several names associated with sponsorship agreements, including Sông Đà Nam Định in 2003 and Mikado Nam Định in 2006.

In 2007, under the new name Đạm Phú Mỹ Nam Định, the club won the 2007 Vietnamese Cup, after defeating Bình Định 1–0, securing one of the major honours in its history.

=== Relegation and returning to the top flight (2009–2021) ===
In 2009, Đạm Phú Mỹ Nam Định later changed it name as Megastar Nam Định. Subsequently the club reverted their name back to Mikado Nam Định in 2011. However, it struggled to maintain its position in the top division and was relegated in 2010.

In 2012, Mikado Nam Định failed to win promotion to the first division after losing on penalties to the Khánh Hòa youth team in the semi-finals. In 2013, the club reverted back to their original name Nam Định.

In 2014, Nam Định promoted to the 2015 V.League 2 after defeating Vĩnh Long 4–0 in the Second Division final at Tam Kỳ Stadium in Quảng Nam. In 2016, Nam Định finished third overall and took part in the play-off of the 2016 National First Division but failed to win promotion to the V.League.

==== V.League 2 champions and return to top-flight (2017–2022) ====
The following season, Nam Định won the 2017 V.League 2 and won the only place to play in the 2018 V.League 1.

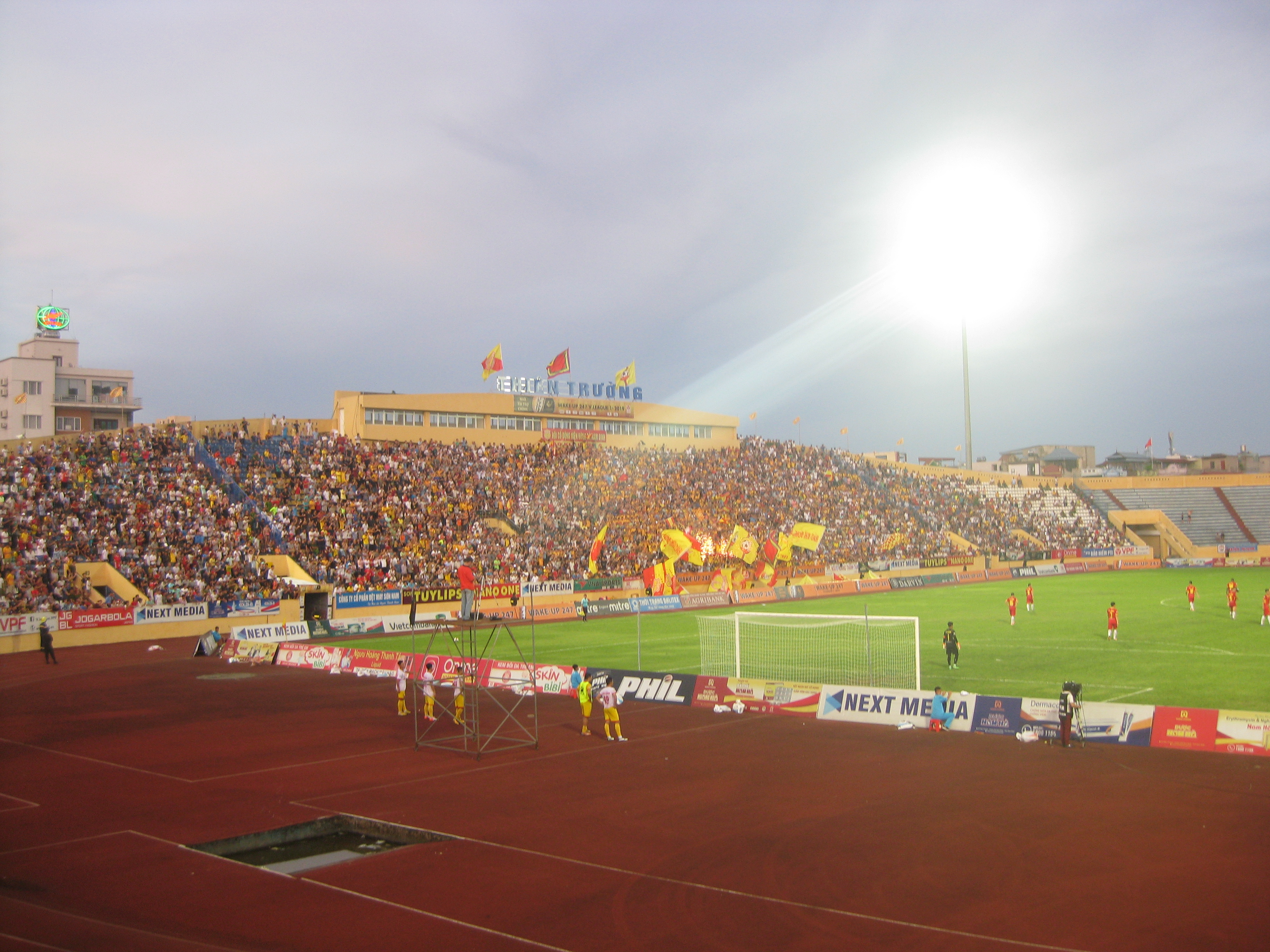
Nam Định playing against Sông Lam Nghệ An in a V.League 1 match on 28 July 2019.

In the 2019 season, it competed as Dược Nam Hà Nam Định following a sponsorship agreement with Nam Hà Pharmaceutical Joint Stock Company. The club returned to the Nam Định name the following season and continued to compete in the top division.

In 2019, the team introduced a new sponsor, Nam Hà Pharmaceutical Joint Stock Company, and changed its name to Dược Nam Hà Nam Định to compete in the V.League 2019. In 2021, the team changed its name back to Nam Định Football Club after the end of the contract with Nam Ha Pharmaceutical Joint Stock Company.

However, this was still a period when financial difficulties always threaten the existence of the club. Typically, the times are continuously slow or out of the budget, even have to accept relegation because they cannot find a worthy funding. There are seasons that the team leaders have to pray for help from the fan association.

=== Vũ Hồng Việt reigns (2022–present) ===
After many poor seasons and even nearing relegation, Nam Định appointed Vũ Hồng Việt as the club head coach on 24 August 2022. Under the guidance of Vũ Hồng Việt, Nam Định has continuously been in the top 5 strongest teams in V-League.

==== Back-to-back league champions (2023–2025) ====
On 25 June 2024, Nam Định officially won the 2023–24 V.League 1 title after a 5–1 victory against Khánh Hòa in the final league match. It was the club's first top-flight league title after 39 years since their last win in 1985. Following the title, the club qualified for the inaugural 2024–25 AFC Champions League Two group stage, making their return to the intercontinental tournament since the 2008 AFC Champions League. On 18 September 2024, Nam Định played against Hong Kong club Lee Man at the Mong Kok Stadium. Rafaelson and Lucas Silva scored a goal to secured a 2–0 win over the Hong Kong club. Nam Định finished in second place in the group stage, thus seeing the team advance to the round of 16 facing against Japanese club Sanfreece Hiroshima. However, Nam Định was hammered 7–0 by the J1 League club, resulting in elimination.

Head coach Vũ Hồng Việt then helmed the club to successfully retain their league title, thus winning the 2024–25 V.League 1 title, and being granted qualification to the 2025–26 AFC Champions League Two and also the regional 2025–26 ASEAN Club Championship. In the ASEAN Club Championship, Nam Định was drawn into group B with Malaysian club Johor Darul Ta'zim, Thailand club Bangkok United, Singaporean club Lion City Sailors and Cambodian club Preah Khan Reach Svay Rieng. Nam Định began the competition with a 2–1 victory over Svay Rieng on 25 September 2025, before recording further wins against Bangkok United and Shan United. The team continued its unbeaten run with a 3–0 victory over Lion City Sailors on 29 January 2026, a result that confirmed its qualification for the semi-finals. Nam Định subsequently drew 1–1 with Johor Darul Ta'zim on 5 February, finishing top of Group B with 13 points from five matches. In the semi-finals, Nam Định faced Malaysian side Selangor over two legs in May 2026. The Vietnamese side lost the first leg 2–1 at the Petaling Jaya Stadium on 6 May. In the return leg at the Thiên Trường Stadium on 13 May, Selangor won 2–0, eliminating Nam Định with a 4–1 aggregate victory. However in the 2025–26 AFC Champions League Two, Nam Định were drawn in Group F alongside Japanese club Gamba Osaka, Thailand club Ratchaburi and Hong Kong club Eastern. The club began its campaign with a 3–1 victory over Ratchaburi on 17 September 2025, followed by a 1–0 away win against Eastern on 2 October. However, Nam Định subsequently lost 3–1 to Gamba Osaka away from home and 1–0 in the return fixture. A 2–0 defeat against Ratchaburi on 27 November further weakened the Vietnamese side's qualification hopes. On 11 December 2025, Nam Định recorded a 9–0 victory over Eastern at home in their final group-stage match. Despite the emphatic win, the result was insufficient to secure qualification for the knockout stage, and the club finished third in Group F with six points from six matches. Nam Định campaign therefore ended in the group stage, despite recording their largest victory of the season.

On 24 October 2025, head coach Vũ Hồng Việt then left his role as head coach where he was appointed as the club technical director after guiding Nam Định to win back-to-back league titles in the 2023–24 and 2024–25 season where he also help the club to win the 2024 Vietnamese Super Cup. Nam Định then later appointed Nguyễn Trung Kiên as the club new head coach for the 2025–26 V.League 1. Later throughout the season on 14 November 2025, Nam Định appointed Portuguese Mauro Jerónimo as the club new head coach becoming the first foreign coach in 21 years, while Nguyễn Trung Kiên was demoted to become his assistant coach. However Mauro Jerónimo reigns didn't last long as he left the club on 26 February 2026. Nam Định then appointed Vũ Hồng Việt for his second stint at the club.

== Team image ==
=== Former team names ===
The club's name was also changed 10 times due to sponsorship reasons:

- Thanh Niên Nam Hà (1965–1982)
- Công Nghiệp Hà Nam Ninh (1982–1991)
- Nam Hà (1991–1996)
- Nam Định (1997–2003)
- Sông Đà Nam Định (2003–2006)
- Mikado Nam Định (2006–2007)
- Đạm Phú Mĩ Nam Định (2007–2008)
- Mikado Nam Định (2006–2007)
- Megastar Nam Định (2009–2011)
- Mikado Nam Định (2011–2013)
- Nam Định (2013–2019)
- Dược Nam Hà Nam Định (2019–2020)
- Nam Định (2021–2022)
- Thép Xanh Nam Định (2022–present)

== Kit suppliers and shirt sponsors ==
Before 1997, the club's kit always used home colors black-white home kits resembling those of Italian club Juventus. (Note: 1982 Vietnamese movie 89th Minute performed at the Nam Định stadium.) The colours originated during the club's time as Nam Hà, leading the media to refer to the team as the "Vietnamese Juventus" during the 1980s and 1990s. Following subsequent changes in sponsorship, the club adopted yellow as its primary colour, later incorporating red and lime accents. In recent years, light blue has become a prominent colour in the club's identity, with the team adopting light blue as its home kit colour. The colour is also reflected in the seating at Thiên Trường Stadium, creating a visual connection between the club and its home ground.

| Period | Kit manufacturer | Shirt sponsor |
|---|---|---|
| 2016–2018 | In house sponsor | Mikado |
| 2018–2019 | (Vietnam) VNA Sport | Nam Hà Pharma |
| 2020–2021 | (Spain) Kelme | Nam Hà Pharma |
| 2022–2023 | (Spain) Kelme | Xuân Thiện Group |
| 2023–2025 | (England) Mitre | Xuân Thiện Group |
| 2025–present | (Japan) Jogarbola | Xuân Thiện Group |

== Stadium ==
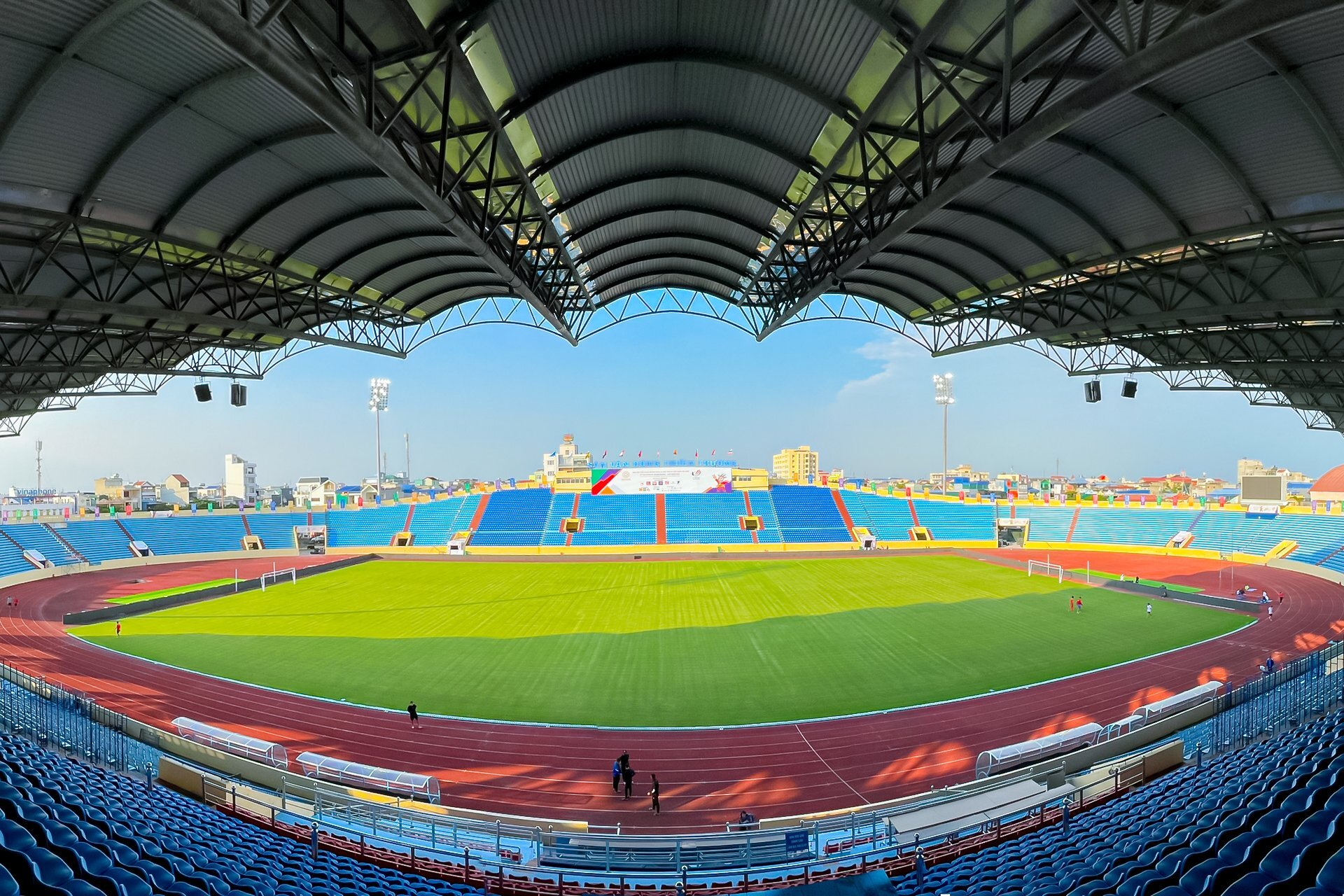
Thiên Trường Stadium

The club's home ground is Thiên Trường Stadium, located in Nam Định. Formerly known as Chùa Cuối Stadium, the venue has a capacity of approximately 30,000 spectators and serves as the club's primary venue for domestic league and cup matches. The stadium has played an important role in the club's history, hosting home fixtures and attracting supporters from Nam Định and surrounding areas. It is also used for various football matches and other sporting events.

At the beginning, the club's home stadium was a dusty training ground of the militia forces, which was usually referred to as Sân Dệt or the "stadium" of the Nam Định Spinning Factory. It was a former field of the Vietnamese National Army's military academy.

From the end of 1970s, their home stadium was Thiên Trường Stadium. During the Vietnam War, thiManagement and staff a big, polluted pond with vegetable fields. Until 2003, it was also known as Chùa Cuối Stadium (lit. Last Temple Stadium).

== Players ==
=== Current squad ===
As of 3 September 2026

Note: Flags indicate national team as defined under FIFA eligibility rules; some limited exceptions apply. Players may hold more than one non-FIFA nationality.

| No. | Pos. | Nation | Player |
|---|---|---|---|
| 4 | DF | VIE | Đàm Tiến Dũng |
| 5 | DF | VIE | Đặng Văn Tới |
| 6 | MF | VIE | A Mít |
| 7 | DF | VIE | Nguyễn Phong Hồng Duy |
| 8 | MF | BRA | Ezequiel |
| 9 | FW | VIE | Nguyễn Văn Toàn |
| 10 | MF | BRA | Caio César |
| 11 | MF | VIE | Nguyễn Tuấn Anh |
| 13 | DF | VIE | Trần Văn Kiên |
| 14 | FW | VIE | Nguyễn Xuân Son |
| 17 | DF | VIE | Nguyễn Văn Vĩ |
| 19 | MF | VIE | Trần Văn Đạt |
| 20 | DF | CAN | Tyler Crawford |
| 22 | MF | VIE | Trần Mạnh Quỳnh |
| 23 | GK | VIE | Lê Vũ Phong |
| 26 | GK | VIE | Trần Nguyên Mạnh (captain) |

| No. | Pos. | Nation | Player |
|---|---|---|---|
| 27 | FW | VIE | Trần Ngọc Sơn |
| 28 | MF | VIE | Tô Văn Vũ (vice-captain) |
| 29 | GK | VIE | Trần Đức Dũng |
| 32 | DF | VIE | Ngô Đức Huy |
| 34 | MF | VIE | Nguyễn Công Sơn |
| 39 | FW | VIE | Lâm Ti Phông |
| 67 | GK | VIE | Trịnh Xuân Hoàng |
| 72 | MF | BRA | Rômulo |
| 77 | MF | AUT | Van-Alessandro Nguyen Skyriotis |
| 79 | DF | VIE | Lê Văn Thành |
| 82 | GK | VIE | Trần Liêm Điều |
| 88 | MF | VIE | Lý Công Hoàng Anh |
| 90 | FW | VIE | Phạm Tuấn Hải |
| 93 | DF | CMR | Félix Eboa Eboa |
| 98 | DF | VIE | Giáp Tuấn Dương |

=== Out on loan ===
Note: Flags indicate national team as defined under FIFA eligibility rules; some limited exceptions apply. Players may hold more than one non-FIFA nationality.

| No. | Pos. | Nation | Player |
|---|---|---|---|
| 2 | DF | VIE | Đinh Xuân Khải (on loan to Xuân Thiện Phú Thọ until 1 July 2027) |
| 8 | MF | VIE | Nguyễn Đình Sơn (on loan to Xuân Thiện Phú Thọ until 1 July 2027) |
| 15 | DF | USA | Reece Gaylor (on loan to Bắc Ninh until 1 July 2027) |
| — | FW | FRA | Kalvin Luong (on loan to SHB Đà Nẵng until 1 July 2027) |

== Coaching staff ==
| Position | Name |
|---|---|
| Head coach | (Vietnam) Vũ Hồng Việt |
| Technical director | (Vietnam) Nguyễn Trung Kiên |
| Assistant coach | (Brazil) André Luiz (Vietnam) Nguyễn Quang Huy |
| Goalkeeper coach | (Vietnam) Bùi Quang Huy |
| Fitness coach | (Brazil) Carlos Pimentel |
| Technical analyst | (Malaysia) Asyraf Fauzi |
| Doctor | (Vietnam) Lê Xuân An |
| Physiotherapist | (Brazil) Dilson Neto (Vietnam) Nguyễn Thành Hưng (Vietnam) Trần Mạnh Trí |
| Interpreter | (Vietnam) Nguyễn Hoàng Việt |
| Logistics | (Vietnam) Phạm Duy Lộc |

== Managerial history ==
Head coaches by years (2003–present)

| Name | Period | Honours |
|---|---|---|
| (Vietnam) Lâm Ngọc Lập | 1978–1989 | 1985 National A1 Championship |
| (Vietnam) Lâm Ngọc Lập | 1990–1991 | |
| (Vietnam) Ninh Văn Bảo | 1997–2002 | |
| (Vietnam) Bùi Hữu Nam | 2003–2004 | |
| (France) Hervé Renard | 2004 | |
| (Vietnam) Nguyễn Ngọc Hảo | 2004–2005 | |
| (Vietnam) Bùi Hữu Nam | 2005–2006 | |
| (Vietnam) Nguyễn Ngọc Hảo | 2007–2009 | 2007 Vietnamese Cup |
| (Vietnam) Nguyễn Thế Cường | 2009–2010 | |
| (Vietnam) Nguyễn Ngọc Hảo | 2010 | |
| (Vietnam) Lê Văn Tuấn | 2010 | |
| (Vietnam) Nguyễn Ngọc Hảo | 2011–2013 | |
| (Vietnam) Nguyễn Thế Cường | 2014–2016 | (gold) 2014 Second Division |
| (Vietnam) Phạm Hồng Phú | 2016–2017 | 2017 V.League 2 |
| (Vietnam) Nguyễn Văn Sỹ | 2018–2019 | |
| (Vietnam) Nguyễn Văn Dũng | 2019–2020 | |
| (Vietnam) Nguyễn Văn Sỹ | 2020 | |
| (Vietnam) Phạm Hồng Phú | 2020–2022 | |
| (Vietnam) Nguyễn Văn Sỹ | 2020–2022 | |
| (Vietnam) Vũ Hồng Việt | 2022–2025 | 2023–24 V.League 1; 2024 Vietnamese Super Cup; 2024–25 V.League 1 |
| (Vietnam) Nguyễn Trung Kiên | 2025 | |
| (Portugal) Mauro Jerónimo | 2025–2026 | |
| (Vietnam) Vũ Hồng Việt | 2026– | |

== Performance in AFC competitions ==
- AFC Champions League Elite: 1 appearance

2008: Group stage

- AFC Champions League Two: 2 appearances

2024–25: Round of 16
2025–26: Group stage

| Season | Competition | Round | Club | Home | Away | Aggregate |
|---|---|---|---|---|---|---|
| 2008 | AFC Champions League | Group F | (China) Beijing Guoan | 1–3 | 0–3 | 4th out of 4 |
| 2008 | AFC Champions League | Group F | (Japan) Kashima Antlers | 0–4 | 0–6 | 4th out of 4 |
| 2008 | AFC Champions League | Group F | (Thailand) Krung Thai Bank | 2–2 | 1–9 | 4th out of 4 |
| 2024–25 | AFC Champions League Two | Group G | (Hong Kong) Lee Man | 3–0 | 2–0 | 2nd out of 4 |
| 2024–25 | AFC Champions League Two | Group G | (Singapore) Tampines Rovers | 3–2 | 3–3 | 2nd out of 4 |
| 2024–25 | AFC Champions League Two | Group G | (Thailand) Bangkok United | 0–0 | 2–3 | 2nd out of 4 |
| 2024–25 | AFC Champions League Two | Round of 16 | (Japan) Sanfrecce Hiroshima | 0–3 | 0–4 | 0–7 |
| 2025–26 | AFC Champions League Two | Group F | (Japan) Gamba Osaka | 0–1 | 1–3 | 3rd out of 4 |
| 2025–26 | AFC Champions League Two | Group F | (Thailand) Ratchaburi | 3–1 | 0–2 | 3rd out of 4 |
| 2025–26 | AFC Champions League Two | Group F | (Hong Kong) Eastern | 9–0 | 1–0 | 3rd out of 4 |

== Performance in AFF competitions ==
| Season | Competition | Round | Club | Home | Away | Aggregate |
|---|---|---|---|---|---|---|
2025–26
| 2025–26 | ASEAN Club Championship | Group stage | (Cambodia) PKR Svay Rieng | 2–1 | —N/a | 1st out of 6 |
| 2025–26 | ASEAN Club Championship | Group stage | (Myanmar) Shan United | —N/a | 3–0 | 1st out of 6 |
| 2025–26 | ASEAN Club Championship | Group stage | (Thailand) Bangkok United | —N/a | 4–1 | 1st out of 6 |
| 2025–26 | ASEAN Club Championship | Group stage | (Singapore) Lion City Sailors | 3–0 | —N/a | 1st out of 6 |
| 2025–26 | ASEAN Club Championship | Group stage | (Malaysia) Johor Darul Ta'zim | 1–1 | —N/a | 1st out of 6 |
| 2025–26 | ASEAN Club Championship | Semi-finals | (Malaysia) Selangor | 0–2 | 1–2 | 1–4 |

== Season-by-season record ==
| Season | Pld | Won | Draw | Lost | GF | GA | GD | PTS | Final position | Notes |
|---|---|---|---|---|---|---|---|---|---|---|
| 1982–83 V-League | 14 | 3 | 6 | 5 | 12 | 13 | −1 | 12 | 6th | Group stage |
| 1984 V-League | 15 | 8 | 3 | 4 | 27 | 26 | +1 | 19 | 3rd | Qualify for 2nd stage |
| 1985 V-League | 16 | 11 | 5 | 0 | 24 | 9 | +15 | 27 | Champions | |
| 1986 V-League | 17 | 6 | 4 | 7 | 29 | 28 | +1 | 16 | 1st (Group stage) | Qualify for 2nd stage |
| 1987–88 V-League | 16 | 3 | 5 | 8 | 22 | 27 | −5 | 10 | 7th | Group stage |
| 1989–1997 | | | | | | | | | | |
| 1998 V-League | 26 | 10 | 6 | 10 | 32 | 29 | +3 | 35 | 8th | |
| 1999–2000 V-League | 24 | 9 | 7 | 8 | 23 | 25 | −2 | 34 | 6th | |
| 2000–01 V-League | 18 | 11 | 1 | 6 | 22 | 17 | +5 | 34 | 2nd | |
| 2003 V-League | 22 | 10 | 6 | 6 | 22 | 19 | +3 | 36 | 3rd | |
| 2004 V-League | 22 | 13 | 5 | 4 | 30 | 23 | +7 | 44 | 2nd | |
| 2005 V-League | 22 | 7 | 7 | 8 | 27 | 31 | +4 | 28 | 6th | |
| 2006 V-League | 24 | 9 | 5 | 10 | 22 | 28 | −6 | 32 | 9th | |
| 2007 V-League | 26 | 10 | 8 | 8 | 35 | 31 | +4 | 38 | 4th | Qualified for 2008 AFC Champions League |
| 2008 V-League | 26 | 9 | 4 | 13 | 24 | 32 | −8 | 31 | 11th | |
| 2009 V-League | 26 | 8 | 7 | 11 | 31 | 36 | −5 | 31 | 12th | Promotion/relegation playoffs |
| 2010 V-League | 26 | 3 | 3 | 20 | 19 | 47 | −28 | 12 | 14th | Relegation to 2011 First League |
| 2011 First League | 26 | 5 | 12 | 9 | 29 | 41 | −12 | 27 | 13th | Relegation to 2012 Second Division |
| 2012 Second Division | | | | | | | | | | |
| 2013 Second Division | | | | | | | | | | |
| 2014 Second Division | 5 | 4 | 1 | 0 | 9 | 1 | +8 | 13 | 1st | Promoted to 2015 V.League 2 |
| 2015 V.League 2 | 14 | 5 | 3 | 6 | 13 | 18 | −5 | 18 | 4th | |
| 2016 V.League 2 | 18 | 8 | 8 | 2 | 25 | 14 | +11 | 32 | 3rd | Qualification to Play-off I |
| 2017 V.League 2 | 12 | 7 | 2 | 3 | 17 | 14 | +3 | 23 | 1st | Promoted to 2018 V.League 1 |
| 2018 V.League 1 | 26 | 5 | 9 | 12 | 33 | 45 | −12 | 24 | 13th | |
| 2019 V.League 1 | 26 | 8 | 7 | 11 | 32 | 41 | −9 | 31 | 11th | |
| 2020 V.League 1 | 18 | 5 | 3 | 10 | 19 | 30 | −11 | 18 | 13th | |
| 2021 V.League 1 | 12 | 6 | 0 | 6 | 23 | 21 | +2 | 18 | 4th | season cancelled due to COVID-19 |
| 2022 V.League 1 | 24 | 6 | 5 | 13 | 21 | 33 | −12 | 23 | 12th | |
| 2023 V.League 1 | 20 | 7 | 8 | 5 | 19 | 19 | +0 | 29 | 5th | |
| 2023–24 V.League 1 | 26 | 16 | 5 | 5 | 60 | 38 | +22 | 52 | Champions | Qualified for 2024–25 AFC Champions League Two |
| 2024–25 V.League 1 | 26 | 17 | 6 | 3 | 51 | 18 | +33 | 57 | Champions | Qualified for 2025–26 AFC Champions League Two |
| 2025–26 V.League 1 | 26 | 9 | 8 | 9 | 33 | 32 | +1 | 35 | 6th | |

== Honours ==
=== National competitions ===
League

- V.League 1
  - Winners (3) : 1985, 2023–24, 2024–25
  - Runners-up (2) : 2000–01, 2004
- V.League 2
  - Winners : 2017
- Second League
  - Winners : 2014

Cups

- Vietnamese Cup
  - Winners (1): 2007
- Vietnamese Super Cup
  - Winners (1): 2024
  - Runner-ups (2): 2007, 2025

=== Other competitions ===
- China-ASEAN Cities Football Invitational Tournament
  - Winners: 2016
  - Runners-up: 2017

== See also ==
- Phong Phú Hà Nam (female)
- Ninh Bình (male)
- Vissai Ninh Bình (dissolved)
