= Gabriel Morbeck =

Brazilian footballer (born 1997)

Personal information
- Full name: Gabriel Argolo Morbeck
- Date of birth: 20 August 1997 (age 29)
- Place of birth: Salvador, Brazil
- Height: 1.85 m (6 ft 1 in)
- Position: Centre-forward

Team information
- Current team: Quy Nhon Binh Dinh

Youth career
- 2010–2017: Vitória

Senior career*
Years	Team	Apps	(Gls)
2017	Roasso Kumamoto	6	(0)
2018	Júbilo Iwata	0	(0)
2018	→ SC Sagamihara (loan)	0	(0)
2022–2023	KS Kastrioti		
2023	Manauara EC		
2023–2024	São Luiz		
2024	EC São José		
2024–	Quy Nhon Binh Dinh		
- * Club domestic league appearances and goals as of 20:03, 29 March 2019 (UTC)

Gabriel Argolo Morbeck (born 20 August 1997) is a Brazilian footballer who currently plays as a forward for V.League 1 Quy Nhon Binh Dinh.

== Club career ==
Gabriel Morbeck joined Roasso Kumamoto in early 2017, having spent his whole career prior with Vitória in Brazil. Gabriel Morbeck is a Brazilian winger who started his career at the youth academy of EC Vitória.

On March 2, 2017, he made a permanent transfer to Roasso Kumamoto. However, his playing time was restricted, and he did not score any goals. On November 27 of that year, it was reported that his contract had ended.

In 2018, Morbeck transferred to Júbilo Iwata. On August 10 of the same year, he joined SC Sagamihara on loan.

On March 5, 2019, his contract with Júbilo Iwata was terminated, and he left the club.

Morbeck spent time in Japan and then played for KS Kastrioti and São Luiz. In August 2024, he joined Quy Nhon Binh Dinh as their new foreign signing for the 2024–25 season. Bình Định FC recently parted ways with numerous important players, including Marlon and Alan. Morbeck is anticipated to fill the vacuum left by leaving talents such as Hà Đức Chinh and Nghiêm Xuân Tú, as the club undergoes major changes in their team.

== Career statistics ==
=== Club ===
As of 29 March 2019.

Club	Season	League			National Cup		League Cup		Continental		Other		Total	
Club	Season	Division	Apps	Goals	Apps	Goals	Apps	Goals	Apps	Goals	Apps	Goals	Apps	Goals
Roasso Kumamoto	2017	J2 League	6	0	1 (Note: Appearances in the Emperor's Cup)	0	0	0	–		0	0	7	0
Júbilo Iwata	2018	J1 League	0	0	1	0	2 (Note: Appearances in the J. League Cup)	0	0	0	0	0	3	0
SC Sagamihara (loan)	2018	J3 League	0	0	0	0	0	0	–		0	0	0	0
Total			6	0	2	0	2	0	0	0	0	0	10	0
