= 2000–01 V-League =

V-League
- Season: 2000–2001
- Dates: 3 December 2000 – 27 May 2001
- Champions: Sông Lam Nghệ An (2nd title)
- Relegated: Đồng Tháp; Khánh Hòa
- Asian Club Championship: Sông Lam Nghệ An
- Asian Cup Winners' Cup: Công An TP.HCM
- Matches: 90
- Goals: 230 (2.56 per match)
- Top goalscorer: Đặng Đạo (11 goals)

The 2000–01 V-League, referred as the 2000–01 Strata V-League for sponsorship reasons, was the 18th season of the V-League, the highest division of Vietnamese football and was the 1st season that the league switched to a professional system. The league played from 3 December 2000 until 27 May 2001.

== Foreign players ==
For the first time in history, foreign players were allowed to play in the V-League.

Thể Công and Công An Hà Nội were not allowed to hire any foreigners.

Club	Player 1	Player 2	Player 3	Player 4	Player 5
Cảng Sài Gòn	(Ivory Coast) Cisse Yousouf	(Ivory Coast) Musa Aliu	(Nigeria) Amadi Wenenda		
Công An Hải Phòng	(Liberia) Vafin K Dolley	(Uganda) Ronald Martin	(Brazil) Wesley Gomes Ferreira	(Brazil) Leandro Fernache Rios	(Ghana) Abdula Mustafa Gibail
Công An TP.HCM	(France) David Serene	(France) Frederic Rault	(China) He Zhi Qiang	(China) Yu Xiang	(China) Zhao Shuang
Đồng Tháp	(Brazil) Anderson Doreis	(Brazil) Gilberto Costa	(Liberia) Sam Dee	(Uganda) Kyobe Livingstone	
Khánh Hòa	(South Korea) Hwang Jung-min	(South Korea) Choi Nam-chul	(South Korea) Chan Sul-ik		
Nam Định	(Russia) Serguei Litvinov	(Belarus) Serguei Tchursine	(Russia) Leonid Panteleimonov		
Sông Lam Nghệ An	(Uganda) Enock Kyembe	(Uganda) Iddi Batambuze	(Ghana) Seidu Saleman Arnas		
Thừa Thiên Huế	(Brazil) Douglas Santos	(Cameroon) Babou Noibi	(Cameroon) Serge Okala		

== Standings ==
Pos	Team	Pld	W	D	L	GF	GA	GD	Pts	Qualification or relegation
1	Sông Lam Nghệ An (C)	18	11	3	4	30	15	+15	36	Qualification to Asian Club Championship
2	Nam Định	18	11	1	6	22	17	+5	34	
3	Thể Công	18	8	5	5	19	16	+3	29	
4	Cảng Sài Gòn	18	7	6	5	29	21	+8	27	
5	Công An TP.HCM	18	8	2	8	26	23	+3	26	Qualification to Asian Cup Winners' Cup
6	Công An Hải Phòng	18	8	1	9	28	30	−2	25	
7	Công An Hà Nội (Note: Công an Hà Nội was deducted 1 point due to having inappropriate competitive attitute during the match against Thừa Thiên – Huế on 22 March.)	18	6	6	6	22	19	+3	23	
8	Thừa Thiên Huế	18	6	5	7	16	21	−5	23	
9	Đồng Tháp (R)	18	4	7	7	23	32	−9	19	Relegation to the First Division
10	Khánh Hòa (R)	18	1	4	13	15	36	−21	7	Relegation to the First Division

Source: VFF
Rules for classification: 1) Number of points; 2) Head-to-head points; 3) Goal difference; 4) Number of goals; 5) Number of away goals; 6) Play-off game (if teams compete for the title or relegation); 7) Draw of lots.
(C) Champions; (R) Relegated

== Statistics ==
=== Top scorers ===
Rank	Name	Clubs	Goals
1	(Vietnam) Đặng Đạo	Khanh Hoa (Khanh Hoa)	11
2	(Vietnam) Huỳnh Hồng Sơn	Cang Sai Gon (TP Ho Chi Minh)	10
3	(Vietnam) Tô Đức Cường	Cong An (Hai Phong)	9
4	(Vietnam) Hồ Văn Lợi	Cang Sai Gon (TP Ho Chi Minh)	8
5	(Vietnam) Nguyễn Lương Phúc	Nam Dinh (Nam Dinh)	7
6	(Vietnam) Vũ Minh Hiếu	Cong An (Ha Noi)	6
6	(Vietnam) Nguyễn Trung Vĩnh	Dong Thap (Cao Lanh)	6
6	(Uganda) Enock Kyembe	Song Lam Nghe An (Vinh)	6
7	(Vietnam) Nguyễn Đức Mạnh	Cong An (Hai Phong)	5
7	(Vietnam) Trần Quan Huy	Cang Sai Gon (TP Ho Chi Minh)	5
7	(Vietnam) Nguyễn Minh Nghĩa	Dong Thap (Cao Lanh)	5
7	(Uganda) Iddi Batambuze	Song Lam Nghe An (Vinh)	5
8	(Vietnam) Lê Huỳnh Đức	Cong An (TP Ho Chi Minh)	4
8	(Vietnam) Nguyễn Thanh Tùng A	Cong An (Ha Noi)	4
8	(Uganda) Ronald Martins Katsigazi	Cong An (Hai Phong)	4
8	(France) David Serene	Cong An (TP Ho Chi Minh)	4
8	(Vietnam) Nguyễn Phi Hùng	Song Lam Nghe An (Vinh)	4
8	(Vietnam) Văn Sỹ Thủy	Song Lam Nghe An (Vinh)	4
8	(Vietnam) Hồ Thanh Thưởng	Song Lam Nghe An (Vinh)	4
8	(Vietnam) Ngô Quang Trường	Song Lam Nghe An (Vinh)	4
8	(Vietnam) Nguyễn Hồng Sơn	The Cong (Ha Noi)	4
8	(Vietnam) Nguyễn Văn Hiền	Thua Thien (Hue)	4
9	(Vietnam) Đặng Phương Nam	The Cong (Ha Noi)	3
9	(Vietnam) Triệu Quang Hà	The Cong (Ha Noi)	3
9	(Vietnam) Phan Thế Hiếu	Cang Sai Gon (TP Ho Chi Minh)	3
9	(Vietnam) Nguyễn Trung Kiên	Cang Sai Gon (TP Ho Chi Minh)	3
9	(Vietnam) Hoàng Kiên Cường	Cang Sai Gon (TP Ho Chi Minh)	3
9	(Vietnam) Hoàng Trung Phong	Cong An (Ha Noi)	3
9	(Vietnam) Vũ Thanh Sơn	Cong An (Ha Noi)	3
9	(Vietnam) Vũ Mạnh Cường	Thua Thien (Hue)	3
9	(Vietnam) Trần Quang Sang	Thua Thien (Hue)	3
9	(Vietnam) Bùi Sỹ Thành	Cong An (TP Ho Chi Minh)	3
9	(Vietnam) Hoàng Hùng	Cong An (TP Ho Chi Minh)	3
9	(Vietnam) Giang Thành Thông	Cong An (TP Ho Chi Minh)	3
9	(Vietnam) Trần Duy Quang	Dong Thap (Cao Lanh)	3
9	(Liberia) Sam Dee	Dong Thap (Cao Lanh)	3
10	(Vietnam) Lê Bật Hưng	Cong An (Ha Noi)	2
10	(Vietnam) Nguyễn Tuấn Thành	Cong An (Ha Noi)	2
10	(Vietnam) Nguyễn Ngọc Thanh	Cang Sai Gon (TP Ho Chi Minh)	2
10	(Vietnam) Nguyễn Thành Thắng	Cong An (Hai Phong)	2
10	(Vietnam) Đặng Văn Dũng	Cong An (Hai Phong)	2
10	(Vietnam) Nguyễn Liêm Thanh	Cong An (TP Ho Chi Minh)	2
10	(Vietnam) Phùng Thanh Phương	Cong An (TP Ho Chi Minh)	2
10	(China) Yu Xiang	Cong An (TP Ho Chi Minh)	2
10	(Vietnam) Nguyễn Văn Hùng	Dong Thap (Cao Lanh)	2
10	(Vietnam) Nguyễn Văn Sỹ	Nam Dinh (Nam Dinh)	2
10	(Russia) Serguei Litvinov	Nam Dinh (Nam Dinh)	2
10	(Vietnam) Trương Việt Hoàng	The Cong (Ha Noi)	2
10	(South Korea) Chan Sul-ik	Khanh Hoa (Khanh Hoa)	2
11	(Vietnam) Hà Mai Giang	Song Lam Nghe An (Vinh)	1
11	(Vietnam) Đăng Quốc Cường	Song Lam Nghe An (Vinh)	1
11	(Vietnam) Trần Xuân Lý	Song Lam Nghe An (Vinh)	1
11	(Vietnam) Nguyễn Xuân Thanh	Cong An (Ha Noi)	1
11	(Vietnam) Nguyễn Mạnh Hà	Cong An (Ha Noi)	1
11	(Liberia) Vafin K Dolley	Cong An (Hai Phong)	1
11	(Vietnam) Quang Hợp	Cong An (Hai Phong)	1
11	(Vietnam) Phạm TIến Dũng	Cong An (Hai Phong)	1
11	(Vietnam) Mai Ngọc Quang	Cong An (Hai Phong)	1
11	(Vietnam) Trịnh Xuân Thành	Cong An (Hai Phong)	1
11	(Vietnam) Nguyễn Ngọc Thọ	Cong An (TP Ho Chi Minh)	1
11	(Vietnam) Nguyễn Việt Thắng	Cong An (TP Ho Chi Minh)	1
11	(Vietnam) Nguyễn Hồng Hải	Cong An (TP Ho Chi Minh)	1
11	(Vietnam) Nguyễn Thanh Sơn	Cang Sai Gon (TP Ho Chi Minh)	1
11	(Vietnam) Lương Trung Tuấn	Cang Sai Gon (TP Ho Chi Minh)	1
11	(Vietnam) Nguyễn Quang	Cang Sai Gon (TP Ho Chi Minh)	1
11	(Ivory Coast) Cisse Yousouf	Cang Sai Gon (TP Ho Chi Minh)	1
11	(Vietnam) Vũ Duy Hoàng	Nam Dinh (Nam Dinh)	1
11	(Vietnam) Phạm Hồng Phú	Nam Dinh (Nam Dinh)	1
11	(Vietnam) Nguyễn Quốc Trung	The Cong (Ha Noi)	1
11	(Vietnam) Vũ Công Tuyền	The Cong (Ha Noi)	1
11	(Vietnam) Nguyễn Minh Tuấn	The Cong (Ha Noi)	1
11	(Vietnam) Thạch Bảo Khanh	The Cong (Ha Noi)	1
11	(Vietnam) Nguyễn Thanh Hải	The Cong (Ha Noi)	1
11	(Vietnam) Đặng Thanh Phương	The Cong (Ha Noi)	1
11	(Vietnam) Nguyễn Đức Dũng	Thua Thien (Hue)	1
11	(Vietnam) Nguyễn Quốc Huy	Thua Thien (Hue)	1
11	(Vietnam) Trần Mậu Trí	Thua Thien (Hue)	1
11	(Vietnam) Đinh Công Thịnh	Thua Thien (Hue)	1
11	(Vietnam) Lê Quyết Thắng	Thua Thien (Hue)	1
11	(Vietnam) Trần Công Minh	Dong Thap (Cao Lanh)	1
11	(Brazil) Anderson Doreis	Dong Thap (Cao Lanh)	1
11	(Brazil) Gilberto Costa	Dong Thap (Cao Lanh)	1
11	(Vietnam) Đoàn Hoàng Sơn	Dong Thap (Cao Lanh)	1
11	(Vietnam) Hoàng Anh Tuấn	Khanh Hoa (Khanh Hoa)	1
11	(Vietnam) Lâm Mộng Huỳnh	Khanh Hoa (Khanh Hoa)	1
