= Nguyễn Trung Kiên (footballer) =

Vietnamese footballer (born 1979)

Personal information
- Birth name: Nguyễn Trung Kiên
- Date of birth: 10 June 1979 (age 47)
- Place of birth: Nam Định, Vietnam
- Position: Midfielder

Team information
- Current team: Thép Xanh Nam Định (head coach)

Youth career
- Nam Dinh

Senior career*
Years	Team	Apps	(Gls)
–2005	Sông Đà Nam Dinh		
2005–2012	Cảng Sài Gòn		

International career
2001–2004	Vietnam	11	(0)

Managerial career
- 2017–2019: Thep Xanh Nam Dinh (assistant)
- 2019–2022: Phù Đổng
- 2022–2023: Thep Xanh Nam Dinh (assistant)
- 2023–2025: Thep Xanh Nam Dinh (technical director)
- 2025: Thep Xanh Nam Dinh
- 2025–: Thep Xanh Nam Dinh (technical director)
- * Club domestic league appearances and goals

Nguyễn Trung Kiên (born 10 June 1979) is a Vietnamese football manager and former footballer who is currently the head coach of V.League 1 club Thép Xanh Nam Định.

== Playing career ==
Trung Kiên started his football career at Thép Xanh Nam Định. And then, he later transferred to Cảng Sài Gòn, whereas he became the expensive transfer in the 2005 V-League with the cost of 1,2 billion VND.

He played in the Vietnam national team, he also included in the 2002 and 2004 AFF Championship squad list, but the 2002 edition didn't make it to the final squad.

He later retired in 2012.

== Managerial career ==
Trung Kiên was named Phù Đổng's head coach in May 2019. In the 2020 Second Division, he helped the team promote to the 2021 V.League 2.

Trung Kiên then became the assistant coach for Vũ Hồng Việt at Nam Định in 2022. Later on 31 January 2023, he was appointed as the team's technical director of Thep Xanh Nam Dinh. On 24 October 2025, he swapped from technical director to head coach with Vũ Hồng Việt due to the latter's poor results. A month after, he returned to his technical director position following the arrival of Mauro Jeronimo.
