= 1985 V-League =

Vietnam National A1 League
- Season: 1985
- Dates: 10 February – 9 June
- Champions: Công Nghiệp Hà Nam Ninh (1st title)
- Goals: 315
- Top goalscorer: Nguyễn Văn Dũng (15 goals)

The 1985 Vietnam National A1 League was the 5th season of the National Football Championship in Vietnam, played from 10 February until 9 June 1985.

== First stage ==
Though not mentioned in any records, the draw limit was used similar to some Soviet Top League seasons. From the 4th draw on, points would not be counted.

=== Group A ===
Pos	Team	Pld	W	D	L	GF	GA	GD	Pts	Qualification
1	Công Nghiệp Hà Nam Ninh	10	5	5	0	9	3	+6	13	Qualify for Second stage
2	Hải Quan	10	5	2	3	14	9	+5	12	Qualify for Second stage
3	Công An Hà Nội	10	4	2	4	9	7	+2	10	Qualify for Second stage
4	Quân Khu 3	10	3	2	5	8	11	−3	8	Qualify for Second stage
5	Tổng Cục Đường Sắt	10	2	4	4	9	11	−2	7	Relegation Playoff
6	Quảng Nam-Đà Nẵng	10	2	3	5	6	14	−8	7	Relegation Playoff

Source: VFF

=== Group B ===
Pos	Team	Pld	W	D	L	GF	GA	GD	Pts	Qualification
1	Cảng Sài Gòn	10	7	1	2	14	6	+8	15	Qualify for Second stage
2	Sở Công Nghiệp TP.HCM	10	5	3	2	10	7	+3	13	Qualify for Second stage
3	Công Nhân Nghĩa Bình	10	4	3	3	11	14	−3	11	Qualify for Second stage
4	Quân Khu Thủ Đô	10	2	3	5	8	10	−2	7	Qualify for Second stage
5	Than Quảng Ninh	10	2	3	5	9	13	−4	7	Relegation Playoff
6	CNXD Hà Nội	10	1	5	4	4	6	−2	5	Relegation Playoff

Source: VFF

=== Group C ===
Pos	Team	Pld	W	D	L	GF	GA	GD	Pts	Qualification
1	Quân Đội	10	5	3	2	16	12	+4	13	Qualify for Second stage
2	Cảng Hải Phòng	10	4	4	2	8	4	+4	11	Qualify for Second stage
3	Lâm Đồng	10	3	4	3	10	9	+1	9	Qualify for Second stage
4	Phòng Không	10	4	1	5	9	11	−2	9	Qualify for Second stage
5	Công Nghiệp Thực Phẩm	10	2	6	2	11	11	0	7	Relegation Playoff
6	Phú Khánh	10	1	4	5	4	11	−7	5	Relegation Playoff

Source: VFF

== Second stage ==
=== Group 1 ===
Pos	Team	Pld	W	D	L	GF	GA	GD	Pts	Qualification
1	Công Nghiệp Hà Nam Ninh	5	5	0	0	12	5	+7	10	Qualify for Final
2	Sở Công Nghiệp TP.HCM	5	4	0	1	9	4	+5	8	Qualify for Final
3	Cảng Hải Phòng	5	3	0	2	8	7	+1	6	
4	Quân Khu 3	5	1	0	4	5	8	−3	2	
5	Lâm Đồng	5	1	0	4	5	8	−3	2	
6	Công Nhân Nghĩa Bình	5	1	0	4	5	12	−7	2	

Source: VFF

=== Group 2 ===
Pos	Team	Pld	W	D	L	GF	GA	GD	Pts
1	Quân Đội	5	4	0	1	12	8	+4	8
2	Công An Hà Nội	5	3	0	2	12	7	+5	6
3	Cảng Sài Gòn	5	3	0	2	9	6	+3	6
4	Hải Quan	5	3	0	2	9	7	+2	6
5	Quân Khu Thủ Đô	5	1	0	4	6	10	−4	2
6	Phòng Không	5	1	0	4	3	13	−10	2

Source: VFF

=== Relegation group ===
Pos	Team	Pld	W	D	L	GF	GA	GD	Pts	Relegation
1	Than Quảng Ninh	5	4	0	1	9	4	+5	8	
2	Phú Khánh	5	3	0	2	9	7	+2	6	
3	Quảng Nam-Đà Nẵng	5	3	0	2	9	7	+2	6	
4	Công Nghiệp Thực Phẩm	5	3	0	2	10	9	+1	6	
5	CNXD Hà Nội	5	2	0	3	4	6	−2	4	Relegated
6	Tổng Cục Đường Sắt	5	0	0	5	3	11	−8	0	Relegated

Source: VFF

== Semifinals ==
Some matches in Group B were deemed "not serious, didn't reflect the real performance", so there was no semifinals. Instead, the top 2 teams in Group A advanced to the Final.

== Final ==
9 June 1985
16:00

Công Nghiệp Hà Nam Ninh	3–1	Sở Công Nghiệp TP.HCM
Nguyễn Văn Em 12'; Trần Trọng Nghĩa 42'; Nguyễn Văn Dũng 44'	Report	Vũ Trọng Thành 57'

Hàng Đẫy Stadium, Hanoi
Attendance: 30,000
Referee: Nguyễn Văn Mùi

Vietnam National A1 League
champions

1st title
