= Lê Quang Trãi =

Vietnamese footballer (born 1977)

Personal information
- Date of birth: 11 February 1977 (age 49)
- Place of birth: Huế, Vietnam
- Height: 1.72 m (5 ft 8 in)
- Position: Defender

Youth career
- –1997: Đồng Tháp

Senior career*
Years	Team	Apps	(Gls)
1997–2003	Đồng Tháp		
2003–2006	Hoàng Anh Gia Lai		
2006–2007	Tiền Giang		
2007–2010	Long An		
2010–2012	Cần Thơ		

International career
1999	Vietnam U23	9	(1)
2004	Vietnam	6	(0)

Managerial career
- 2015–2022: PVF
- 2022–2024: Hồ Chí Minh City (assistant)
- 2024: Hoàng Anh Gia Lai (assistant)
- 2024–: Hoàng Anh Gia Lai
- * Club domestic league appearances and goals

Lê Quang Trãi (born 11 February 1977) is a Vietnamese football coach and former player who is the head coach of V.League 1 club Hoang Anh Gia Lai.

== Playing career ==
Born in Huế, Vietnam. Quang Trãi moved to Đồng Tháp at the age of 1. He began his youth career in Đồng Tháp FC and later promoted to the first team in 1997. He played for Đồng Tháp until he was released by the club in 2003. After signing for Hoàng Anh Gia Lai, he won two V.League titles in 2003 and 2004.

Quang Trãi played six times for the Vietnam national team in 2004.

== Managerial career ==
Quang Trãi began his coaching career in 2015, when he was appointed as a coach for the youth teams of PVF Football Academy. On 3 October 2022, he left the academy and joined Ho Chi Minh City as an assistant coach. In the 2024–25 season, Trãi joined his former club Hoàng Anh Gia Lai as an assistant coach and was then promoted to head coach.

== Personal life ==
He has been nicknamed "Mặt Quỷ".

== Honours ==
Hoàng Anh Gia Lai

- V.League 1: 2003, 2004
