= Ninh Văn Bảo =

Vietnamese football manager

Ninh Văn Bảo (1945–2002) was a Vietnamese football manager.

== Early life ==
He played football and operated as a midfielder.

== Career ==
He managed Nam Định from 1997 until his death in 2002.

== Management style ==
He was described as "people still talk about this team's "very strange" playing style. Actually, there's nothing too difficult to explain about it. That is "knowing who knows you" from team leaders, coaches to players. A style that does not emphasize exuberance but emphasizes efficiency. A style of play with the mobility of the sideline players".

== Personal life ==
He was a native of Nam Dinh, Vietnam.
