= Mark Huynh =

American soccer player (born 2002)

Personal information
- Date of birth: March 22, 2002 (age 24)
- Place of birth: Andover, Massachusetts, United States
- Height: 1.75 m (5 ft 9 in)
- Position: Left-back

Youth career
- Seacoast United Phantoms

College career
Years	Team	Apps	(Gls)
2020–2023	Tufts Jumbos		

Senior career*
Years	Team	Apps	(Gls)
2020–2022	Valeo FC		
2022–2024	Boston Street Soccer		
2024	Athlone Town	1	(0)
2025	Hải Phòng	2	(0)
2025–2026	PVF-CAND B	14	(0)
- * Club domestic league appearances and goals as of 6 June 2026

Mark Huynh (born March 22, 2002) is an American professional soccer player who last played as a left-back for V.League 2 club PVF-CAND B.

== Early life ==
Huynh was born on March 22, 2002. Born in Andover, Massachusetts, United States, he is of Vietnamese descent through his parents. He attended Tufts University.

== Career ==
As a youth player, Huynh joined the youth academy of Seacoast United Phantoms. In 2020, he signed for Valeo FC. Two years later, he signed for Boston Street Soccer.

Ahead of the 2024 season, he joined Irish side Athlone Town. On October 18, 2024, he debuted for the club during a 0–2 away loss to Kerry in the League of Ireland First Division. This was his only league appearance for the team.

In February 2025, he came to his parents origin country Vietnam and signed for V.League 1 club Hải Phòng. On May 9, 2025, he debuted for the club during a 2–0 away win over Ho Chi Minh City in the 2024–25 V.League 1.

On September 14, 2025, Huynh was transferred to V.League 2 side PVF-CAND B.

== Style of play ==
Huynh operates mainly as a left-back, but can also play as a left winger.

== Career statistics ==
Appearances and goals by club, season and competition
Club	Season	League			National cup		Other		Total	
Club	Season	Division	Apps	Goals	Apps	Goals	Apps	Goals	Apps	Goals
Athlone Town	2024	League of Ireland First Division	1	0	1	0	—		2	0
Haiphong FC	2024–25	V.League 1	2	0	0	0	—		2	0
PVF-CAND B	2025–26	V.League 2	15	0	—		—		15	0
Career total			18	0	1	0	0	0	19	0
