= Luis Salazar (footballer) =

Colombian footballer

Personal information
- Full name: Luis Ángel Salazar Cuesta
- Date of birth: 10 August 1994 (age 32)
- Place of birth: Quibdó, Colombia
- Height: 2.00 m (6 ft 7 in)
- Position: Center back

Team information
- Current team: Paraná

Youth career
- –2013: Águilas Doradas

Senior career*
| Years | Team | Apps | (Gls) |
| 2013 | Expreso Rojo | 15 | (2) |
| 2014–2018 | Barra | | |
| 2015 | → Coritiba B (loan) | | |
| 2016 | → Ceará (loan) | 1 | (0) |
| 2016 | → Camboriú Futebol Clube (loan) | | |
| 2017 | → Avaí (loan) | 2 | (0) |
| 2018 | → Prudentópolis (loan) | 12 | (0) |
| 2018 | → Batatais (loan) | | |
| 2019 | Rio Branco | 11 | (0) |
| 2019 | ASA | 8 | (0) |
| 2019–2020 | Andraus | | |
| 2020 | Rio Branco | 11 | (1) |
| 2020–2021 | Paraná | 18 | (1) |
| 2021 | Azuriz | 11 | (0) |
| 2021–2022 | Ypiranga | 5 | (1) |
| 2022–2023 | Azuriz | 18 | (0) |
| 2022 | → Paysandu (loan) | 0 | (0) |
| 2023–2024 | Confiança | 21 | (2) |
| 2024 | América RN | 21 | (2) |
| 2024–2025 | Quy Nhơn Bình Định | 21 | (2) |
| 2025–2026 | Internacional | 11 | (0) |
| 2026– | Paraná | 0 | (0) |
- * Club domestic league appearances and goals as of 8 March 2026

Luis Ángel Salazar Cuesta (born 10 August 1994) is a Colombian professional footballer who plays as a center-back for Campeonato Paranaense Second Division team Paraná.

== Club career ==
Salazar began his professional career at Expreso Rojo, where he stayed for one season, before moving to Brazil, where he played during several years.

In April 2024, Salazar scored the only goal of the 2024 Campeonato Potiguar final, helping América RN win the title.

In August 2024, Salazar moved to Vietnam, signing for V.League 1 side Quy Nhơn Bình Định.

== Honours ==
América RN

- Campeonato Potiguar: 2024
