= Nguyễn Đình Trung =

Vietnamese businessman

- Born: January 12, 1972 (age 54); Thái Bình, Vietnam
- Occupations: Property developer, business owner, entrepreneur
- Organization(s): Hung Thinh Corporation, Hung Thinh Land, Hung Thinh Incons, Hung Thinh Legacy
- Known for: Chairman/Founder of Hung Thinh Corporation

Nguyễn Đình Trung (born 1972) is a Vietnamese businessman and property developer. He is the Hung Thinh Corporation's chairman. He was named one of Vietnam's top real estate developers by Forbes Vietnam.

== Early life and education ==
Nguyễn Đình Trung was born in 1972 in Thái Bình. He grew up in Bình Định. In 1990, he entered college and later graduated with a degree in accounting.

== Career ==
=== Hung Thinh Corporation ===
In 2002, he founded Hung Thinh Land, which at that time was known as Dong Tien Trading Investment Advisory Services Co., Ltd. In 2007, the company's name was changed to Hung Thinh Real Estate Business Investment Joint Stock Company (Hung Thinh Corporation).

The first real estate project that Trung and his company invested in was Thiên Nam Apartment (District 10, Ho Chi Minh City) – which was acquired from Temexim in 2009.

On May 16, 2011, Hung Thinh Corporation held a press conference at Sheraton Hotel to announce the appointment of MC Nguyễn Cao Kỳ Duyên as their brand ambassador. Chairman Trung said that this decision was part of the company's market expansion strategy, due to MC Duyên's influence on the overseas Vietnamese community.

In 2014, Hung Thinh appointed An Le, former US Consul General in Ho Chi Minh City between 2010 and 2013, as its international advisor. Chairman Trung said the move would aid in promoting properties to overseas Vietnamese.

In 2016, Trung was appointed as Vice Chairman of Ho Chi Minh City Real Estate Association (HOREA). He later revealed that Hung Thinh had acquired 14 real estate projects in Ho Chi Minh City, Khanh Hoa and Vung Tau that year – including An Lac Plaza and Western Plaza.

In 2017, Hung Thinh signed a contract with Phat Dat Real Estate Development Corporation to acquire ownership of the Cam Ranh Mystery Villas. According to chairman Trung, the company at that time had developed about 30 real estate projects.

In 2019, Trung started investing in technology development – by signing contracts with FPT, TMA, NashTech and other technological institutes.

== Other interests and recognition ==
Trung has acknowledged that he is a fan of sports – specifically tennis and football. In 2019, Hung Thinh signed a contract with VFF to become a sponsor for Vietnam's national football team.

In its December 2020 issue, Forbes Vietnam ranked Trung as one of the Top 10 property developers in Vietnam at that time.

== See also ==
- Phạm Nhật Vượng
