= 2001–02 V-League =

V-League
- Season: 2001–02
- Dates: 2 December 2001 – 12 May 2002
- Champions: Cảng Sài Gòn
- Relegated: Công An Hải Phòng; Thừa Thiên Huế
- AFC Champions League: Cảng Sài Gòn
- Top goalscorer: Hồ Văn Lợi (9 goals)

The 2001–02 V-League, referred as the 2001–02 Strata V-League for sponsorship reasons, was the 19th season of the V-League, the highest division of Vietnamese football and the 2nd season as professional league. The season began on 3 December 2000 and concluded on 27 May 2001.

The bottom side at the end of the season get relegated. The side that finishes 9th enters an end of season play-off match against the 2nd Division's 2nd placed side.

== Foreign players ==
Thể Công was not allowed to hire any foreign players.

Club	Player 1	Player 2	Player 3	Player 4	Player 5	Player 6	Player 7
Bình Định	(Nigeria) Golden Ajeboh	(Nigeria) Blessing Ughojo	(Russia) Sergei Kondratev	(Russia) Mikhail Matveev	(Russia) Aleksei Sagcheneko		
Cảng Sài Gòn	(Ivory Coast) Musa Aliu	(Ghana) Gerald Kofie	(Ghana) Kwasi Poku Yeboah	(Nigeria) Bakare Adewunmi Ganiyu	(Uganda) Livingstone Kyobe		
Cong An Hà Nội	(Iran) Iman Alami	(Kazakhstan) Denis Imailov	(Russia) Alexandre Khomiakov	(Ukraine) Vycheslav Lepavko	(Russia) Ismailov		
Công An Hải Phòng	(Russia) Sergei Komyagin	(Russia) Oleg Reshetov	(Russia) Ruslan Reshetov	(Uganda) Andrew Lule	(Uganda) Ronald Martin		
Công An TP.HCM	(China) He Zhi Qiang	(China) Yu Xiang	(China) Zhao Shuang	(Cameroon) Guy Badang	(France) David Serene		
Đà Nẵng	(Brazil) Mathias Penge	(Nigeria) Declan Emeribe	(Poland) Tomasz Cebula	(Poland) Mariusz Wysocki	(Russia) Mikhailovich Khairulin	(Russia) Oleg Ostudin	(Uganda) Majid Musisi
Nam Định	(Nigeria) Emeka Achilefu	(Nigeria) Sunday Ilevbare	(Russia) Sergei Chmokine	(Russia) Serguei Litvinov	(Russia) Leonid Panteleimonov		
Sông Lam Nghệ An	(Uganda) Gerald	(Uganda) Iddi Batambuze	(Uganda) Sawanyana Isa	(Uganda) Lulenti Kyeyune	(Uganda) Enock Kyembe		
Thừa Thiên Huế	(Cameroon) Babou Noubi	(Nigeria) Emmanuel Ayuk	(South Korea) Chan Sul-ik	(South Korea) Hwang Jeing-man	(South Korea) Hwang Jung-min		

== Standings ==
Pos	Team	Pld	W	D	L	GF	GA	GD	Pts	Qualification or relegation
1	Cảng Sài Gòn (C)	18	9	5	4	20	16	+4	32	Nominated for AFC Champions League Third qualifying round
2	Sông Lam Nghệ An	18	8	4	6	22	16	+6	28	
3	Công An TP.HCM	18	7	5	6	25	20	+5	26	
4	Bình Định	18	7	5	6	13	12	+1	26	
5	Nam Định	18	6	7	5	21	20	+1	25	
6	Đà Nẵng	18	6	6	6	14	14	0	24	
7	Thể Công	18	6	5	7	16	16	0	23	
8	Công An Hà Nội	18	5	6	7	19	22	−3	21	
9	Thừa Thiên Huế (R)	18	6	3	9	17	24	−7	21	Qualification to relegation play-offs
10	Công An Hải Phòng (R)	18	5	4	9	19	26	−7	19	Relegation to First Division

Source: VFF
Rules for classification: 1) points; 2) goal difference; 3) number of goals scored.
(C) Champions; (R) Relegated

== Relegation play-offs ==
In the relegation/promotion play-offs, Thừa Thiên Huế faced LG.ACB, the runners up of the 2001–02 Vietnamese First Division/

23 May 2002

Thừa Thiên Huế	0–1	LG.ACB
	Report	Takács 104'

Vinh Stadium, Nghệ An
Referee: Đặng Thanh Hạ

== Top scorers ==
Rank	Name	Club	Goals
1	(Vietnam) Hồ Văn Lợi	Cang Sai Gon	9
2	(Nigeria) Emeka Achilefu	Nam Dinh	8
3	(Uganda) Kyeyune Lulenti	Song Lam Nghe An	7
4	(Vietnam) Bùi Đoàn Quang Huy	Cong An Ha Noi	6
4	(Vietnam) Văn Sỹ Thủy	Song Lam Nghe An	6
5	(Nigeria) Ayuk Emmanuel	Thua Thien Hue	5
5	(Vietnam) Huỳnh Hồng Sơn	Cang Sai Gon	5
5	(Vietnam) Nguyễn Trường Giang	Cong An Hai Phong	5
6	(Vietnam) Vũ Minh Hiếu	Cong An Ha Noi	4
6	(Vietnam) Nguyễn Tuấn Thành	Cong An Ha Noi	4
6	(China) Yu Xiang	Cong An TP Ho Chi Minh	4
6	(Vietnam) Lê Huỳnh Đức	Cong An TP Ho Chi Minh	4
6	(Vietnam) Hoàng Hùng	Cong An TP Ho Chi Minh	4
6	(Vietnam) Tô Đức Cường	Cong An Hai Phong	4
6	(Uganda) Batambuze Iddi	Song Lam Nghe An	4
6	(Vietnam) Trần Quang Sang	Thua Thien Hue	4
7	(Poland) Mariusz Wysocki	Đà Nẵng	3
7	(Poland) Tomaz Cebula	Đà Nẵng	3
7	(Russia) Oleg Reshetov	Cong An Hai Phong	3
7	(Russia) Sergei Komyagin	Cong An Hai Phong	3
7	(Uganda) Ronald Martins	Cong An Hai Phong	3
7	(Vietnam) Ngô Quang Trường	Song Lam Nghe An	3
7	(Vietnam) Thạch Bảo Khanh	Thể Công	3
7	(Vietnam) Nguyễn Quốc Trung	Thể Công	3
7	(Vietnam) Trương Việt Hoàng	Thể Công	3
7	(Vietnam) Phùng Thanh Phương	Cong An TP Ho Chi Minh	3
7	(Vietnam) Nguyễn Ngọc Thanh	Cang Sai Gon	3
8	(Nigeria) Blessing Ughojo	Bình Định	2
8	(Nigeria) Ajeboh Golden	Bình Định	2
8	(Vietnam) Lê Minh Mính	Bình Định	2
8	(Iran) Alemi Iman	Cong An Ha Noi	2
8	(Kazakhstan) Denis Imailov	Cong An Ha Noi	2
8	(South Korea) Hwang Jung-min	Thua Thien Hue	2
8	(Ivory Coast) Aliu Musa	Cang Sai Gon	2
8	(Vietnam) Nguyễn Văn Tuấn	Cang Sai Gon	2
8	(France) David Serene	Cong An TP Ho Chi Minh	2
8	(Vietnam) Nguyễn Liêm Thanh	Cong An TP Ho Chi Minh	2
8	(Vietnam) Nguyễn Ph. Hoài Linh	Cong An TP Ho Chi Minh	2
8	(Vietnam) Đặng Phương Nam	Thể Công	2
8	(Vietnam) Nguyễn Minh Tuấn	Thể Công	2
8	(Uganda) Musisi Majid Mukiibi	Đà Nẵng	2
8	(Vietnam) Ng. Ngọc Anh Tuấn	Đà Nẵng	2
8	(Vietnam) Mai Ngọc Quang	Cong An Hai Phong	2
8	(Vietnam) Nguyễn Lương Phúc	Nam Dinh	2
8	(Vietnam) Phan Thế Hiếu	Nam Dinh	2
9	(China) Zhao Shuang	Cong An TP Ho Chi Minh	1
9	(Vietnam) Giang Thành Thông	Cong An TP Ho Chi Minh	1
9	(Vietnam) Ngọc Đài	Cong An TP Ho Chi Minh	1
9	(Vietnam) Hứa Hiền Vinh	Cong An TP Ho Chi Minh	1
9	(Vietnam) Lê Anh Dũng	Cong An Ha Noi	1
9	(Ukraine) Vycheslav Lepavko	Cong An Ha Noi	1
9	(Vietnam) Trịnh Quốc Khánh	Cong An Ha Noi	1
9	(Uganda) Gerald	Song Lam Nghe An	1
9	(Vietnam) Nguyễn Huy Hoàng	Song Lam Nghe An	1
9	(Nigeria) Sunday Samuel Ilevbare	Nam Dinh	1
9	(Russia) Sergei Litvinov	Nam Dinh	1
9	(Vietnam) Phạm Xuân Phú	Nam Dinh	1
9	(Vietnam) Trần Huy Trung	Nam Dinh	1
9	(Vietnam) Duy Hoàng	Nam Dinh	1
9	(Vietnam) Trần Nam Long	Nam Dinh	1
9	(Vietnam) Nguyễn Văn Tuấn	Nam Dinh	1
9	(South Korea) Hwang Jeing-man	Thua Thien Hue	1
9	(Vietnam) Nguyễn Đức Dũng	Thua Thien Hue	1
9	(Vietnam) Lê Quyết Thắng	Thua Thien Hue	1
9	(Vietnam) Nguyễn Văn Hiền	Thua Thien Hue	1
9	(Vietnam) Nguyễn Cảnh Lâm	Thua Thien Hue	1
9	(Vietnam) Nguyễn Thành Lợi	Bình Định	1
9	(Vietnam) Trương Văn Tâm	Bình Định	1
9	(Vietnam) Nguyễn Văn Tâm	Bình Định	1
9	(Vietnam) Nguyễn Văn Hiển	Bình Định	1
9	(Vietnam) Trần Văn Hùng	Đà Nẵng	1
9	(Nigeria) Declan Emeribe	Đà Nẵng	1
9	(Vietnam) Hà Sá	Đà Nẵng	1
9	(Vietnam) Lê Quang Cường	Đà Nẵng	1
9	(Vietnam) Vũ Như Thành	Thể Công	1
9	(Uganda) Andrew Lule	Cong An Hai Phong	1
9	(Vietnam) Đào Thế Phong	Cong An Hai Phong	1
9	(Nigeria) Ganiyu Bakare Adewunmi	Cang Sai Gon	1
