= Vũ Hồng Việt =

Vietnamese footballer (born 1979)

Personal information
- Birth name: Vũ Hồng Việt
- Date of birth: 16 March 1979 (age 47)
- Place of birth: Thái Bình, Việt Nam
- Position: Midfielder

Team information
- Current team: Nam Định

Youth career
- –1997: Tổng Cục Đường sắt

Senior career*
Years	Team	Apps	(Gls)
1997–2002	Hà Nội ACB		
2002–2007	Hoàng Anh Gia Lai		
2007–2009	Hòa Phát Hà Nội		

International career
1997	Vietnam U19		
1999	Vietnam U23	9	(1)

Managerial career
- 2011–2019: Hanoi FC Youth
- 2017: Vietnam U15
- 2017–2018: Vietnam U19
- 2019–2020: Quảng Nam
- 2020–2022: Vietnam (assistant)
- 2022–2025: Thép Xanh Nam Định
- 2025–2026: Thép Xanh Nam Định (technical director)
- 2026–: Thép Xanh Nam Định
- * Club domestic league appearances and goals

Vũ Hồng Việt (born 16 March 1979) is a Vietnamese football manager and former footballer who is currently the head coach of V.League 1 club Thép Xanh Nam Định.

== Playing career ==
Hồng Việt started his football career in 1997 at Hà Nội (who later become Hà Nội ACB). The peal of his playing career was between 2003 and 2004, while he played for Hoàng Anh Gia Lai and managed to win two V.League 1 titles with the club in 2003 and 2004. He retired in 2009, with his lats club being Hòa Phát Hà Nội.

== Managerial career ==
After his retirement, Hồng Việt started his coaching career at Hà Nội reserves and youth side in 2011, where he remained for 8 years. As a manager, his "philosophy is to play small possession, short and attacking". From 2017 to 2018, he took charge of Vietnam's under-15s and under-19s and won the 2017 AFF U-15 Championship.

He coached V.League 1 side Quảng Nam from 2018 and 2020 before resigning in June 2020 after the club dropped into a relegated spot. Thereafter, he served as assistant under Park Hang-seo with the Vietnam national team until August 2022, after accepting the offer to coach Nam Định. There, he helped the club win back-to-back league title, the 2023–24 V.League 1, thus achieving also the first league title in his coaching career and the following season, the 2024–25 V.League 1 title.

On 24 October 2025, he appointed from his role from head coach to technical director of Thep Xanh Nam Dinh. This came after a string of poor results.

== Managerial statistics ==
As of match played 13 May 2026

Managerial record by team and tenure
Team	Nat.	From	To	Record					Ref.
Team	Nat.	From	To	G	W	D	L	Win %	Ref.
Quảng Nam	(Vietnam)	23 May 2019	30 June 2020	23	8	6	9	34.78	
Nam Định	(Vietnam)	24 August 2022	24 October 2025	113	55	27	31	48.67	
Nam Định	(Vietnam)	26 February 2026	Present	12	7	1	4	58.33	
Career Total				148	70	34	44	47.30	

== Honours ==
=== As player ===
Hoàng Anh Gia Lai

- V.League 1: 2003, 2004
- Vietnamese Super Cup: 2003, 2004

=== As manager ===
Vietnam U15

- AFF U-16 Championship: 2017

Vietnam U19

- International Thanh Niên Newspaper Cup: 2017, 2018

Thép Xanh Nam Định

- V.League 1: 2023–24, 2024–25

Individual

- V.League 1 Manager of the Season: 2023–24, 2024–25
