= Marlon Rangel =

Brazilian footballer

Personal information
- Full name: Marlon Rangel de Almeida
- Date of birth: 22 May 1996 (age 30)
- Place of birth: Linhares, Brazil
- Height: 1.89 m (6 ft 2 in)
- Position: Centre-back

Team information
- Current team: Chanmari
- Number: 23

Senior career*
Years	Team	Apps	(Gls)
2016–2017	Bahia		
2017	Capixaba		
2017–2018	Cinfães	28	(0)
2018–2020	Chaves B	19	(2)
2018–2020	Chaves		
2020–2021	Lusitânia	17	(1)
2021–2023	Valadares Gaia	25	(1)
2023–2024	Quy Nhon Binh Dinh	38	(2)
2024–2025	SHB Da Nang	11	(0)
2026–	Chanmari		
- * Club domestic league appearances and goals as of 21:17, 12 March 2026 (UTC)

Marlon Rangel de Almeida (born 22 May 1996) is a Brazilian professional footballer who plays as a centre-back for Indian Football League club Chanmari.

== Career ==
On 17 July 2018, Rangel signed his first professional transfer with Chaves after his early career Rangel made his professional debut for Chaves in a 2–0 Primeira Liga loss to Nacional on 23 December 2018.
