= 2007 Vietnamese Cup =

Tournament details
- Country: Vietnam
- Dates: 9 February – 30 September
- Teams: 27

Final positions
- Champions: DPM. Nam Dinh
- Runners-up: Binh Dinh FC

Tournament statistics
- Matches played: 26
- Goals scored: 61 (2.35 per match)
- All statistics correct as of 19 April 2021.

The 2007 Vietnamese Cup (known as the Bamboo Airways National Cup for sponsorship reasons) season was the 15th edition of the Vietnamese National Cup, the football knockout tournament of Vietnam organized by the Vietnam Football Federation.

== Pre-classified ==
Five teams had an automatic qualification bye from the first round for the round of 16.

== First round ==
All matches in the first round took place on February 9.

Quan khu 4 FC 0-1 TN Quang Ngai FC

DPM. Nam Dinh FC 4-0 Quan khu 5 FC

Quang Nam FC 1-0 Thanh Hóa FC

Huda Hue F.C. 0-0 Than Quang Ninh FC [4-3 pen]

VH.Hai Phong 1-0 Hà Nội ACB

TCDK. SLNA 1-0 The Cong Viettel

TDCS Dong Thap F.C. 2-1 An Giang FC

DMN.SG 0-5 Binh Duong FC

Khanh Hoa FC 3-0 Tay Ninh F.C.

Can Tho FC 2-1 HA Gia Lai

TMN.CSG 4-1 T.Pomina Tien Giang

== Round of 16 ==
All matches in this round took place on February 24.

Hòa Phát Hà Nội F.C. 1-1 TN.Quang Ngai [6-5 pen]

DPM. Nam Dinh FC 4-1 Quang Nam FC

Huda Hue F.C. 0-0 VH.Hai Phong [6-5 pen]

TCDK.SLNA 0-0 Da Nang [1-0 pen]

Binh Dinh FC 2-2 Dong Nai [3-2 pen]

TDCS Dong Thap F.C. 2-1 Binh Duong FC

Khanh Hoa FC 1-0 Can Tho FC

TMN.CSG 0-2 GDT.LA

== Quarter–final round ==
[May 31] Semi-Final	Hòa Phát Hà Nội F.C.	0-2	DPM. Nam Dinh FC	Vietnam
		Report	Hoang Ngoc 32, 60

[May 31] Semi-Final	Huda Hue F.C.	0-3	TCDK SLNA	Vietnam
		Report	Le Cong Vinh 22, 77, Valdiney 37

[May 31] Semi-Final	Binh Dinh FC	4-2	TDCS Dong Thap F.C.	Vietnam
	Tran Doan Khoa Thanh 9, Sarayoot 27, 63, Le Kim Binh 70	Report	Pham Thanh Tuan 30; Phan Thanh Binh 70

[Jun 1] Semi-Final	Khanh Hoa FC	1-0	GDT.LA	Vietnam
	Van Phu 90	Report

== Semi-finals ==
[Sep 9] Semi-Final	DPM. Nam Dinh FC	1-1*	TCDK. SLNA	Vietnam
	Khuong Quoc Tuan 91	Report	Nguyen Trong Hoang 74
Note: *[4-3 pen]

[Sep 9] Semi-Final	Binh Dinh FC	1-1*	Khanh Hoa FC	Vietnam
	Le Minh Mính 20	Report	Dao Van Phong 42
Note: *[7-6 pen]

== Final ==
Sep 30 Final	DPM. Nam Dinh FC	1-0	Binh Dinh FC	Vietnam
	Tran Trong Loc 17	Report		Stadium: Ninh Binh; Attendance: 8,000
