= Nguyễn Văn Sỹ =

Vietnamese footballer (born 1971)

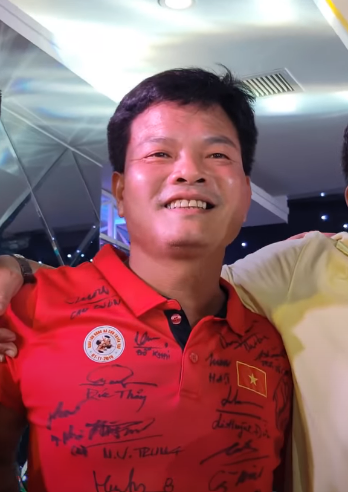
- Văn Sỹ in 2019

Personal information
- Date of birth: 21 November 1971 (age 54)
- Place of birth: Nam Định, North Vietnam
- Height: 1.68 m (5 ft 6 in)
- Position: Midfielder

Youth career
- 1982–1986: Nam Định

Senior career*
Years	Team	Apps	(Gls)
1987–2004	Nam Định	117	(23)

International career
1995–2002	Vietnam	42	(6)
- * Club domestic league appearances and goals

Nguyễn Văn Sỹ (born 21 November 1971) is a Vietnamese football manager and former player who last managed Nam Định.

== Career ==
Nguyễn spent his entire playing career with Vietnamese side Nam Định and was regarded as an important midfielder for the Vietnam national team during the middle to late 1990s and early 200s.
