= Hung Thinh Land =

Estate developer in Vietnam

Hưng Thịnh Land
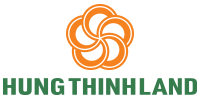
- Industry: Real estate development
- Headquarters: Ho Chi Minh City, Vietnam
- Area served: Vietnam
- Owner: Hung Thinh Corporation
- Website: www.hungthinhland.com

Hung Thinh Land is a real estate developer in Vietnam. Founded in 2002 by entrepreneur Nguyễn Đình Trung, it is a subsidiary of Hung Thinh Corporation.

According to a report by Vietcombank Securities, from 2016 to the first half of 2020, the company accounted for 4% of the residential real estate market share in Vietnam, making it the 2nd largest real estate developer in Vietnam at that time.

By the end of June 2020, statistics from Hanoi Stock Exchange showed that Hung Thinh Land’s equity had reached a total of VND 6,084 billion.

As of May 2021, the company is reported by VnExpress to own 4,500 hectares of land in Ho Chi Minh City and the neighboring provinces.

== See also ==
- Vinhomes
- Vingroup
- Sun Group (Vietnam)
