= Ronald Martin (footballer) =

Ugandan footballer (born 1980)

Personal information
- Full name: Ronald Martin Katsigazi
- Date of birth: 18 November 1980 (age 45)
- Place of birth: Uganda
- Height: 1.75 m (5 ft 9 in)
- Position: Midfielder

Senior career*
Years	Team	Apps	(Gls)
1999–2000	Osotspa F.C.		
2001–2002	Haiphong FC		
2003–2004	Long An FC		
2005	Quang Nam FC		
2006	Vissai Ninh Bình FC		
2007–2011	Hòa Phát Hà Nội FC		
- * Club domestic league appearances and goals

Ronald Martin Katsigazi (born 18 November 1980) is a Ugandan former footballer.

Martin moved to Vietnam in 2000. In 2005, he was approached by match-fixers to manipulate the score of a game in Vietnam. He mainly operated as a midfielder and was known for his versatility.

Martin is a naturalized Vietnamese citizen.
