= Nguyễn Ngọc Hảo =

Vietnamese football manager

Nguyễn Ngọc Hảo is a Vietnamese former football manager.

== Early life ==
He attended university in Vietnam.

== Career ==
He was described as "many years of success in leading Nam Dinh and even Khatoco Khanh Hoa".

== Personal life ==
He is a native of Nam Dinh, Vietnam.
