= 2004 V-League =

V-League
- Season: 2004
- Dates: 4 January – 20 June
- Champions: Hoàng Anh Gia Lai (2nd title)
- Relegated: Ngân Hàng Đông Á Thể Công
- AFC Champions League: Hoàng Anh Gia Lai; Bình Định
- ASEAN Club Championship: Hoàng Anh Gia Lai
- Matches: 132
- Top goalscorer: Amaobi Uzowuru (15 goals)
- Highest scoring: 339

The 2004 V-League, referred as the 2004 Kinh Đô V-League for sponsorship reasons, was the 21st season of the V-League, the highest division of Vietnamese football and the 4th season as professional league. The season began on 4 January and concluded on 20 June 2004.

Hoàng Anh Gia Lai won their second title in this season.

== League table ==
Pos	Team	Pld	W	D	L	GF	GA	GD	Pts	Qualification or relegation
1	Hoàng Anh Gia Lai (C)	22	14	4	4	40	15	+25	46	Qualification for the AFC Champions League & ASEAN Club Championship
2	Sông Đà Nam Định	22	13	5	4	30	23	+7	44	
3	Gạch Đồng Tâm Long An	22	12	2	8	41	33	+8	38	
4	Sông Lam Nghệ An	22	9	10	3	38	17	+21	37	
5	LG Hà Nội ACB	22	11	3	8	30	26	+4	36	
6	Bình Dương	22	7	7	8	24	24	0	28	
7	Bình Định (Note: Bình Định qualified to 2005 AFC Champions League by winning the 2004 Vietnamese Cup.)	22	7	6	9	22	30	−8	27	Qualification for the AFC Champions League
8	Delta Đồng Tháp	22	7	4	11	23	29	−6	25	
9	Đà Nẵng	22	5	9	8	27	28	−1	24	
10	Thép Việt Úc Hải Phòng	22	7	1	14	22	37	−15	22	
11	Thể Công (R)	22	5	5	12	20	39	−19	20	Relegation to V.League 2
12	Ngân Hàng Đông Á (R)	22	4	6	12	22	38	−16	18	Relegation to V.League 2

Rules for classification: 1) Points; 2) Head-to-head points; 3) Head-to-head goal difference; 4) Head-to-head goals scored; 5) Goal difference; 6) Goals scored; 7) Disciplinary points (1 point for each yellow card, 3 points for each red card)
(C) Champions; (R) Relegated
