= Tam Kỳ Stadium =

Coordinates: 15°33′36″N 108°30′24″E

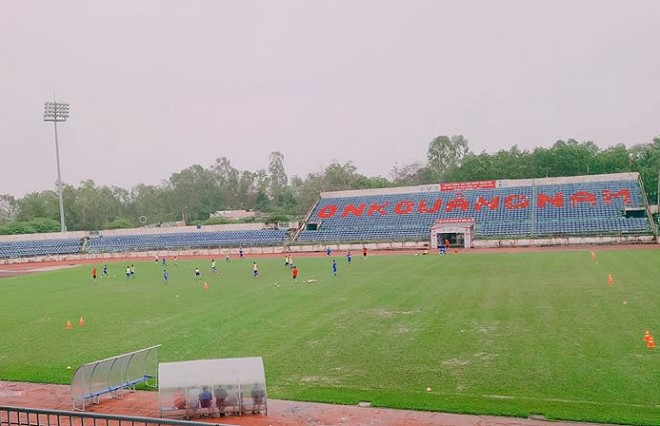
- Tam Kỳ Stadium
- Interactive map of Tam Kỳ Stadium
- Location: Hương Trà ward, Đà Nẵng
- Owner: Đà Nẵng
- Capacity: 15,000
- Surface: Grass

Tenants
- Quang Nam FC (1997–2025); SHB Da Nang B (2026–present)

Tam Kỳ Stadium (Vietnamese: Sân vận động Tam Kỳ) is a multi-use stadium located in Đà Nẵng, Vietnam. The stadium holds around 15,000 people and is mostly used for football matches. It is currently the home stadium of SHB Da Nang B, formerly for Quang Nam FC
