= Quy Nhơn Stadium =

Sports venue in Vietnam

Coordinates: 13°46′28″N 109°13′43″E

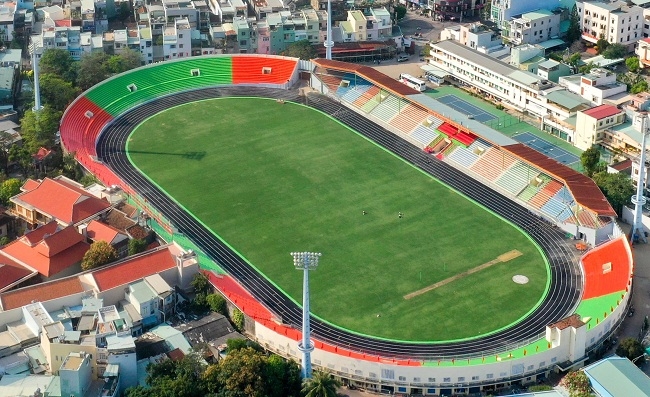
Quy Nhon Stadium

Quy Nhơn Stadium is a multi-use stadium in Quy Nhơn, Gia Lai Vietnam. It is mostly used for football matches and is the home stadium of Quy Nhon United. The stadium holds 20,000 people.
