= Quy Nhon United FC =

Vietnamese football club

Quy Nhon United
- Full name: Quy Nhon United Football Club
- Nickname: Đội bóng đất Võ (Land of Martial Arts)
- Founded: 1975; 51 years ago as Bình Định Youth
- Ground: Quy Nhơn Stadium
- Capacity: 16,000
- Owner: Binh Dinh Sport JSC
- Chairman: Đinh Hồng Vinh
- Manager: Trịnh Duy Quang
- League: V.League 2
- 2025–26: V.League 2, 4th of 12
- Website: Official website
Home colours	Away colours	Third colours

Quy Nhon United Football Club (Vietnamese: Câu lạc bộ Bóng đá Quy Nhơn United), formerly known as Binh Dinh, is a Vietnamese professional association football club based in Quy Nhơn ward, Gia Lai. They currently play in the V.League 2, following relegation in the 2024–25 season.. Their home stadium is Quy Nhơn Stadium which has a capacity of 20,000.

In August 2023, the team changes its name to Quy Nhon Binh Dinh with the intention to promote the image of Quy Nhơn city to a larger public.

== History ==
The team was founded in 1975 as “Binh Dinh Youth”.The first important milestone of the team was the friendly match between the Quy Nhon youth football team and the An Nhon youth football team which took place on May 1, 1975. After this match, the Binh Thanh Youth Football Team Dinh was established with the core force from the two above teams led by Mr. Luu, with players Phan Kim Lan (Lan Ve), Dang Gia Man (Man Lùn), Tong Anh Hoang (commonly known as A ), Le Thanh Huy, Le Van Minh, Nguyen Van Thin, Vo Van Cang, Nguyen Van Ha (Son Dia), goalkeeper Lan Mom... After its establishment, in May 1975, the team had 2 friendly matches with Khanh Hoa team in Ninh Hoa and Nha Trang and 2 friendly matches with Quang Nam Da Nang team in Hoi An and Da Nang.

In 1976, the team participated in the Truong Son Football Tournament and won the style award. After this tournament, the team participated in national tournaments to be promoted to Class A movement and was considered one of the local teams with notable performance achievements.

In 1980, the Nghia Binh Workers' Football Team was established with the core of the Binh Dinh Youth Team, adding players such as: Duong Ngoc Hung, Nguyen Ngoc Thien, Tran Minh Canh... and participating in the A1 national football tournament. country. At this tournament, the team is in Group A, along with the teams of Cang Saigon, Hanoi Police, Military Region 3, Food Industry and Tien Giang. In the group stage, the team ranked 4th with 9 points, scored 11 goals and conceded 16 goals.

After the 1989 season, the team split into two separate teams. Players Bui Van Sy, Ta Manh Thoi... return to Quang Ngai Football Team. The remaining members formed the Binh Dinh Football Club, with additional players Nguyen Ngoc Thai, Phan Ton Quyen, Le Ngoc Dung, Nguyen Xuan Hoanh, Nguyen Van Cuong, Tran Kim Duc, Nguyen Cong Long, Nguyen Hoang Anh Dung...

In the 1995 season, the team did not compete in the play-off round with Quang Nam-Da Nang, Long An, and Song Be to react to the tournament organizers about negative issues, so they were disciplined and get relegated.

After winning promotion, with the 1998 season being unsuccessful, the team was relegated again and only returned to the highest league in the 2001-2002 season. In this tournament, the team ranked fourth overall, with 26 points overall, winning 7, drawing 5 and losing 6.

=== Return to V.League and accomplishements ===
On 17 May 2018, Binh Dinh officially signed a cooperation contract with TMS Group Corporation, launching Binh Dinh TMS Football Club. In the 2018 V.League 2, Binh Dinh TMS finished in 9th place. In the 2019 season, the team no longer had the sponsor's name and registered to compete under the name Binh Dinh Football Club, finishing in 11th place in the 2019 V.League 2.

On 25 December 2020, Hưng Thịnh Land and TopenLand Vietnam became the two main sponsors of Binh Dinh Football Club for three V.League seasons, from the 2021 season to the 2023 season, with a total budget of up to 300 billion VND. The team changed its name to TopenLand Binh Dinh Football Club. On 19 November 2022, at Quy Nhon Stadium, TopenLand Binh Dinh Football Club defeated Ho Chi Minh City 2–1 in the final round of 2022 V.League 1, clinching the bronze medal. In the 2022 V.League 1, TopenLand Binh Dinh Football Club reached the final but lost to Hanoi FC 2–0.

On 22 September 2023, TopenLand Binh Dinh Football Club changed its name to Quy Nhon Binh Dinh Football Club to compete in 2023–24 season. Within 3 months, on 1 December 2023, the team changed its name again to MerryLand Quy Nhon Binh Dinh Football Club, after the main sponsor, MerryLand Quy Nhon. In the 2023–24 V.League 1, under the management of Bùi Đoàn Quang Huy, the club had the second best attack and second best defense in the league and finish as league's runners-up for the first time in their history, with only 6 points behind league champion Thep Xanh Nam Dinh. After the season ended, the club switched their name back to Quy Nhon Binh Dinh.

On 22 June 2025, following the 2–4 defeat to Hanoi FC in the last matchday of the 2024–25 V.League 1, the club finished last in the league and relegated to the V.League 2 after their four consecutive years in Vietnamese top-flight.

== Kit suppliers and shirt sponsors ==
Period	Kit manufacturer	Shirt sponsor
2020–present	(Vietnam) Kamito	Topenland MerryLand Quy Nhon

== Current squad ==
As of 5 October 2026

Note: Flags indicate national team as defined under FIFA eligibility rules; some limited exceptions apply. Players may hold more than one non-FIFA nationality.

No.	Pos.	Nation	Player
2	DF	VIE	Lê Minh Nhật (on loan from PVF)
5	DF	VIE	Lê Nguyễn Quốc Kiên
6	DF	VIE	Mai Việt Hoàng
7	FW	VIE	Dương Quang Trung Hiếu
8	MF	VIE	Nguyễn Võ Minh Hiếu
9	FW	VIE	Đào Gia Việt
10	MF	VIE	Nguyễn Hải Chi Nguyện
11	MF	VIE	Đinh Thành Luân
12	DF	VIE	Phạm Ngô Minh Quang (on loan from Hoàng Anh Gia Lai)
13	FW	VIE	Nguyễn Anh Tuấn (on loan from PVF)
14	MF	VIE	Lê Nguyễn Thanh Vị
15	DF	VIE	Lương Văn Phương (on loan from PVF)
17	FW	VIE	Triệu Đức Anh (on loan from SHB Đà Nẵng)
18	DF	VIE	Trần Văn Thái

No.	Pos.	Nation	Player
20	DF	VIE	Nguyễn Thanh Thụ
21	MF	VIE	Quách Quang Huy (on loan from PVF)
24	MF	VIE	Nguyễn Thế Hùng
25	GK	VIE	Hà Mạnh Trường (on loan from Công An Hà Nội)
27	DF	VIE	Nguyễn Đăng Thọ (on loan from Hoàng Anh Gia Lai)
32	DF	VIE	Nguyễn Quốc Toản (on loan from PVF)
36	MF	VIE	Phạm Trọng Hóa
68	GK	VIE	Cao Hoàng Trường Long
77	FW	VIE	Lê Thanh Phong
86	FW	EGY	Alexander Jakobsen
88	FW	VIE	Trịnh Long Vũ (on loan from PVF)
90	DF	VIE	Trần Mạnh Cường
97	GK	VIE	Võ Văn Sơn
98	FW	VIE	Trần Lê Duy

=== Other players under contract ===
Note: Flags indicate national team as defined under FIFA eligibility rules; some limited exceptions apply. Players may hold more than one non-FIFA nationality.

No.	Pos.	Nation	Player
—	MF	VIE	Nguyễn Thanh Hùng (on loan from SHB Đà Nẵng)

== Coaching staff ==
Position	Name
Head coach	(Vietnam) Trịnh Duy Quang
Technical director	(Vietnam) Bùi Đoàn Quang Huy
Assistant coach	(Vietnam) Lương Trung Tuấn (Vietnam) Nguyễn Hoàng Duy
Technical analyst	(Vietnam) Võ Doãn Thục Kha
Doctor	(Vietnam) Ngô Phi Tài
Logistics	(Vietnam) Lư Tấn Hậu (Vietnam) Nguyễn Công Huy

== Performance in AFC competitions ==
- AFC Champions League: 2 appearances

2004: Group stage
2005: Group stage

Season	Competition	Round	Club	Home	Away	Aggregate
2004	AFC Champions League	Group G	(Japan) Yokohama F. Marinos	0–3	0–6	4th
2004	AFC Champions League	Group G	(South Korea) Seongnam Ilhwa Chunma	1–3	0–2	4th
2004	AFC Champions League	Group G	(Indonesia) Persik Kediri	2–2	0–1	4th
2005	AFC Champions League	Group G	(South Korea) Busan I'Park	0–4	0–8	4th
2005	AFC Champions League	Group G	(Indonesia) Persebaya Surabaya	0–0	0–1	4th
2005	AFC Champions League	Group G	(Thailand) Krung Thai Bank	1–2	1–0	4th

== Managers ==
- (Vietnam) Phan Kim Lân (1981–1990)
- (Vietnam) Dương Ngọc Hùng (2003–2004)
- (Thailand) Arjhan Srong-ngamsub (2005)
- (Vietnam) Dương Ngọc Hùng (2006–2007)
- (Vietnam) Nguyễn Ngọc Thiện (2008)
- (Vietnam) Dương Ngọc Hùng (2008–2010)
- (Vietnam) Phan Tôn Quyền (2010)
- (Vietnam) Nguyễn Ngọc Thiện (2010–2011)
- (Vietnam) Trần Kim Đức (2011)
- (Vietnam) Hoàng Văn Gia (2011–2012)
- (Vietnam) Trần Kim Đức (2012)
- (Vietnam) Nguyễn Văn Hùng (2012–2013)
- (Vietnam) Nguyễn Thành Lợi (2013–2017)
- (Vietnam) Bùi Đoàn Quang Huy (2018–2019)
- (Vietnam) Nguyễn Đức Thắng (2020–2023)
- (Vietnam) Bùi Đoàn Quang Huy (2023–2025)
- (Vietnam) Trần Minh Chiến (2025)
- (Vietnam) Trịnh Duy Quang (2025–)

== Honours ==
=== League ===
- V.League 1
  - Runners-up: 2023–24
  - Third place: 2006, 2022
- V.League 2
  - Winners: 2001, 2020
  - Runners-up: 2010, 2011
- Second League
  - Winners: 2017
  - Runners-up: 2016

=== Cup ===
- Vietnamese Cup
  - Winners: 2003, 2004
  - Runners-up: 2007, 2022
  - Third place: 2023

=== Friendly ===
- Ho Chi Minh City Cup
  - Winners: 2021
- Thiên Long Cup
  - Winners: 2023
