= 2023 Vietnamese Cup =

Tournament details
- Country: Vietnam
- Dates: 31 March – 20 August 2023
- Teams: 24

Final positions
- Champions: Dong A Thanh Hoa (1st title)
- Runners-up: Viettel FC

Tournament statistics
- Matches played: 23
- Goals scored: 58 (2.52 per match)
- Attendance: 75.500 (3 per match)
- Top goal scorer(s): Nham Manh Dung (3 goals)

The 2023 Vietnamese Cup (Vietnamese: Giải bóng đá Cúp Quốc gia 2023) is the 31st edition of the Vietnamese National Football Cup, the premier knockout competition in Vietnamese football. A total of 24 clubs contested, including all teams from the top two tiers of the Vietnamese football league system. The tournament began on 31 March 2023 with the first-round matches, and were concluded on 20 August 2023 with the final.

V.League 1 team Hanoi FC were the defending champions, having defeated Topenland Binh Dinh to secure their third title in the previous year's final.

The winners will play the 2023 Vietnamese Super Cup against the 2023 V.League 1 winners.

== Background ==
This edition was the last use of the traditional year-round format in tournament play. 14 teams from V.League 1 and 10 teams from V.League 2 contested. The title winning club of the tournament would automatically qualify for the 2024 Vietnamese Super Cup tournament. Hanoi FC is the defending champion after they won the 2022 Vietnamese Cup.

Round	Main date	Number of fixtures	Clubs remaining	New entries this round
First Round	31 March	10	18 → 9	
Round of 16	6 & 7 July	8	9+7 → 8	Hanoi FC, Hoang Anh Gia Lai, Topenland Binh Dinh, Dong A Thanh Hoa and 3 other teams following a random draw.
Quarter-finals	10 July	4	8 → 4	
Semi-finals	16 August	2	4 → 2	
Final	20 August	1	2 → 1	

== Matches ==
=== Qualifying round ===
31 March 2023	Long An (2)	1–0	Binh Phuoc (2)	Long An Stadium, Long An
17:00 UTC+7	Phan Tấn Tài 70'	Report		Attendance: 1,000; Referee: Nguyễn Anh Vũ

31 March 2023	Phu Dong (2)	1–0	Hoa Binh (2)	Ninh Bình Stadium, Ninh Bình
17:00 UTC+7	Bùi Xuân Lộc 45+1'	Report		Attendance: 700; Referee: Trần Trung Hiếu

31 March 2023	Ho Chi Minh City (1)	1–1 (0–3 p)	Ba Ria Vung Tau (2)	Thống Nhất Stadium, Ho Chi Minh City
19:15 UTC+7	Hoàng Vũ Samson 27'	Report	Phan Nhật Thanh Long 79'	Attendance: 1,000; Referee: Trần Văn Trọng
	Penalties
	Ngô Tùng Quốc (penalty missed); Uông Ngọc Tiến (penalty missed); Hoàng Vĩnh Nguyên (penalty missed)		(penalty scored) Nguyễn Thái Quốc Cường; (penalty scored) Phạm Lý Đức; (penalty scored) Nguyễn Trọng Bảo

1 April 2023	Hue (2)	0–4	Becamex Binh Duong (1)	Tự Do Stadium, Huế
16:00 UTC+7		Report	Nguyễn Trần Việt Cường 35', 46'; Nguyễn Tiến Linh 51'; Nguyễn Thành Lộc 63'	Attendance: 3,000; Referee: Mai Xuân Hùng

1 April 2023	Song Lam Nghe An (1)	1–1 (3–4 p)	Quang Nam (2)	Vinh Stadium, Nghệ An
18:00 UTC+7	Nguyễn Trọng Hoàng 11'	Report	Lê Văn Hưng 35'	Attendance: 1,000; Referee: Dương Hữu Phúc
	Penalties
	Quế Ngọc Hải (penalty missed); Phạm Xuân Mạnh (penalty scored); Nguyễn Trọng Hoàng (penalty missed); Trần Mạnh Quỳnh (penalty scored); Đinh Xuân Tiến (penalty scored)		(penalty scored) Nguyễn Đình Bắc; (penalty scored) Trần Hoàng Hưng; (penalty scored) Trần Hữu Đông Triều; (penalty missed) Phạm Hoàng Lâm; (penalty scored) Trần Thành

1 April 2023	Viettel (1)	6–0	Binh Thuan (2)	Hàng Đẫy Stadium, Hanoi
19:15 UTC+7	Trương Tiến Anh 8'; Nhâm Mạnh Dũng 21', 30'; Dương Văn Hào 56'; Nguyễn Hữu Thắng 58'; Nguyễn Đức Chiến 63'	Report	Nguyễn Thanh Quang (red card) 61'	Attendance: 500; Referee: Vũ Phúc Hoan

2 April 2023	Khanh Hoa (1)	1–3	Cong An Hanoi (1)	Nha Trang Stadium, Khanh Hoa
17:00 UTC+7	Yago Ramos 42'	Report	Đoàn Văn Hậu 64'; Phạm Gia Hưng 81'; Lê Văn Đô 85'	Attendance: 7,000; Referee: Trần Ngọc Nhớ

2 April 2023	Thep Xanh Nam Dinh (1)	1–1 (4–3 p)	Haiphong (1)	Thiên Trường Stadium, Nam Dinh
18:00 UTC+7	Samuel Nnamani 58'	Report	Carlos Fernández 56'	Attendance: 10,000; Referee: Đỗ Anh Đức
	Penalties
	Dominic Vinicius (penalty scored); Đinh Viết Tú (penalty scored); Samuel Nnamani (penalty missed); Nguyễn Hạ Long (penalty scored); Hêndrio (penalty scored)		(penalty scored) Carlos Fernández; (penalty scored) Đặng Văn Tới; (penalty scored) Hồ Minh Dĩ; (penalty missed) Phạm Mạnh Hùng; (penalty missed) Lương Xuân Trường

2 April 2023	PVF-CAND (2)	2–2 (3–0 p)	SHB Da Nang (1)	PVF Stadium, Hưng Yên
19:15 UTC+7	Võ Nguyên Hoàng 33', 47'	Report	Đặng Anh Tuấn 29'; Hà Minh Tuấn 90+2'	Attendance: 800; Referee: Lê Đức Cảnh
	Penalties
	Ngô Viết Phú (penalty scored); Nguyễn Văn Tùng (penalty scored); Lý Trung Hiếu (penalty scored)		(penalty missed) Lâm Qúi; (penalty missed) Lương Duy Cương; (penalty missed) Đào Nhật Minh

=== Round of 16 ===
6 July 2023	Hanoi FC	1–2	Viettel	Hàng Đẫy Stadium, Hà Nội
19:15 UTC+7	Phạm Tuấn Hải 31'	Report	Nguyễn Hoàng Đức 13'; Jeferson 77'	Attendance: 4000; Referee: Hoàng Thanh Bình

6 July 2023	Topenland Binh Dinh	1–1 (6–5 p)	Quang Nam	Quy Nhơn Stadium, Bình Định
18:00 UTC+7	Hà Đức Chinh 70'	Report	Lê Văn Hưng 24'	Attendance: 3000; Referee: Dương Hữu Phúc
	Penalties
	Nghiêm Xuân Tú (penalty scored); Hà Đức Chinh (penalty scored); Đỗ Văn Thuận (penalty missed); Đỗ Thanh Thịnh (penalty scored); Lê Ngọc Bảo (penalty scored); Lý Công Hoàng Anh (penalty scored); Phan Ngọc Tín (penalty scored)		(penalty missed) Nguyễn Đình Bắc; (penalty scored) Bùi Quang Huy; (penalty scored) Nguyễn Vũ Hoàng Dương; (penalty scored) Trần Thành; (penalty scored) Mạc Đức Việt Anh; (penalty scored) Nguyễn Văn Ngọc; (penalty missed) Trần Ngọc Hiệp

6 July 2023	Hong Linh Ha Tinh	3–1	Long An	Hà Tĩnh Stadium, Hà Tĩnh
18:00 UTC+7	Vũ Quang Nam 66', 73'; Nguyễn Trung Học 86'	Report	Lê Thanh Phong 90+2'	Attendance: 3000; Referee: Nguyễn Ngọc Tùng

6 July 2023	Dong A Thanh Hoa	4–0	Ba Ria Vung Tau	Thanh Hoá Stadium, Thanh Hoá
18:00 UTC+7	Trịnh Văn Lợi 6'; Lê Văn Thắng 24'; Doãn Ngọc Tân 73'; Nguyễn Minh Tùng 88'	Report		Attendance: 2000; Referee: Trần Trung Hiếu

Saigon	Cancelled	Phu Dong

7 July 2023	Hoang Anh Gia Lai	1–0	Becamex Binh Duong	Pleiku Stadium, Gia Lai
17:00 UTC+7	Nguyễn Quốc Việt 90'	Report		Attendance: 5000; Referee: Đỗ Thành Đệ

7 July 2023	Phu Tho	0–2	PVF-CAND	Việt Trì Stadium, Phú Thọ
16:00 UTC+7		Report	Phạm Gia Hưng 24'; Nguyễn Thanh Nhàn 65'	Attendance: 500; Referee: Lê Thanh Tùng

7 July 2023	Cong An Hanoi	1–1 (2–3 p)	Thep Xanh Nam Dinh	Hàng Đẫy Stadium, Hanoi
19:15 UTC+7	Raphael Success 78'	Report	Hêndrio 65'	Attendance: 10000; Referee: Nguyễn Viết Duẩn
	Penalties
	Jhon Cley (penalty missed); Nguyễn Quang Hải (penalty missed); Huỳnh Tấn Sinh (penalty scored); Đoàn Văn Hậu (penalty scored); Vũ Văn Thanh (penalty missed); Gustavo Henrique (penalty missed)		(penalty scored) Mai Xuân Quyết; (penalty missed) Hoàng Minh Tuấn; (penalty missed) Đinh Viết Tú; (penalty scored) Andre Luiz; (penalty missed) Nguyễn Phong Hồng Duy; (penalty scored) Dương Thanh Hào

=== Quarter-final ===
10 July 2023	Viettel	2–0	Thep Xanh Nam Dinh	Hàng Đẫy Stadium, Hà Nội
19:15 UTC+7	Jeferson 53'; Nhâm Mạnh Dũng 73'	Report		Referee: Mai Xuân Hùng

10 July 2023	Topenland Binh Dinh	2–1	Hong Linh Ha Tinh	Quy Nhơn Stadium, Bình Định
18:00 UTC+7	Phạm Văn Thành 11'; Rafaelson 44'	Report	Abdoulaye Diallo 85'	Referee: Khổng Tam Cường

10 July 2023	Dong A Thanh Hoa	1–0	Phu Dong	Thanh Hoá Stadium, Thanh Hoá
17:00 UTC+7	Lê Thanh Bình 39'	Report		Referee: Vũ Phúc Hoan

10 July 2023	Hoang Anh Gia Lai	1–1 (4–5 p)	PVF-CAND	Pleiku Stadium, Gia Lai
17:00 UTC+7	Nguyễn Tuấn Anh 49'	Report	Trần Ngọc Sơn 18'	Referee: Trần Văn Trọng
	Penalties
	Trần Thanh Sơn (penalty scored); Trần Bảo Toàn (penalty scored); Châu Ngọc Quang (penalty scored); Nguyễn Đức Việt (penalty scored); Nguyễn Tuấn Anh (penalty missed); Lê Hữu Phước (penalty missed)		(penalty scored) Nguyễn Thanh Nhàn; (penalty missed) Trần Ngọc Sơn; (penalty scored) Nguyễn Hiểu Minh; (penalty scored) Huỳnh Công Đến; (penalty scored) Lý Trung Hiếu; (penalty scored) Phạm Gia Hưng

=== Semi-final ===
16 August 2023	Viettel	1–0	Topenland Binh Dinh	Hàng Đẫy Stadium, Hà Nội
18:00 UTC+7	Nguyễn Đức Chiến 90+3'	Report		Referee: Nguyễn Mạnh Hải

16 August 2023	Dong A Thanh Hoa	4–1	PVF-CAND	Thanh Hoá Stadium, Thanh Hoá
18:00 UTC+7	Nguyễn Trọng Hùng 25'; Ngô Viết Phú 28' (o.g.); Lê Thanh Bình 45'; Hoàng Đình Tùng 89'	Report	Nguyễn Thanh Nhàn 67'	Referee: Nguyễn Viết Duẩn

=== Final ===
20 August 2023	Dong A Thanh Hoa	0–0 (5–3 p)	Viettel	Thanh Hoá Stadium, Thanh Hoá
18:00 UTC+7		Report		Attendance: 16,000; Referee: Vũ Nguyên Vũ
	Penalties
	Paulo Conrado (penalty scored); Lê Thanh Bình (penalty scored); Gustavo Santos (penalty scored); Đàm Tiến Dũng (penalty scored); Bruno Cantanhede (penalty scored)		(penalty scored) Nguyễn Hoàng Đức; (penalty missed) Bùi Tiến Dũng; (penalty scored) Nguyễn Đức Chiến; (penalty scored) Mohamed Essam

== Bracket ==
First round
1 April 2023; Hang Day Stadium
Viettel (2)	6
Binh Thuan (3)	0
2 April 2023; 19/8 Stadium
Khanh Hoa (4)	1
Cong An Hanoi (5)	3
2 April 2023; Thien Truong Stadium
Thep Xanh Nam Dinh (6)	1 (4)
Haiphong (7)	1 (3)
1 April 2023; Vinh Stadium
Song Lam Nghe An (9)	1 (3)
Quang Nam (10)	1 (4)
31 March 2023; Long An Stadium
Long An (12)	1
Binh Phuoc (13)	0
31 March 2023; Thong Nhat Stadium
Ho Chi Minh City (15)	1 (0)
Ba Ria-Vung Tau (16)	1 (3)
31 March 2023; Ninh Binh Stadium
Phu Dong (18)	1
Hoa Binh (19)	0
1 April 2023; Tu Do Stadium
Hue FC (21)	0
Becamex Binh Duong (22)	4
2 April 2023; PVF Stadium
PVF-CAND (24)	2 (3)
SHB Da Nang (25)	2 (0)

Round of 16
6 July 2023; Hang Day Stadium
Hanoi FC (1)	1
Viettel (2)	2
7 July 2023; Hang Day Stadium
Cong An Hanoi (5)	1 (2)
Thep Xanh Nam Dinh (6)	1 (3)
6 July 2023; Quy Nhon Stadium
Topenland Binh Dinh (8)	1 (6)
Quang Nam (10)	1 (5)
6 July 2023; Ha Tinh Stadium
Hong Linh Ha Tinh (11)	3
Long An (12)	1
6 July 2023; Thanh Hoa Stadium
Dong A Thanh Hoa (14)	4
Ba Ria- Vung Tau (16)	0
Saigon (17)
Phu Dong (18)	w/o
7 July 2023; Pleiku Stadium
Hoang Anh Gia Lai (20)	1
Becamex Binh Duong (22)	0
7 July 2023; Viet Tri Stadium
Phu Tho (23)	0
PVF-CAND (24)	2

Quarter-Finals
10 July 2023; Hang Day Stadium
Viettel (2)	2
Thep Xanh Nam Dinh (6)	0
10 July 2023; Quy Nhon Stadium
Topenland Binh Dinh (8)	2
Hong Linh Ha Tinh (11)	1
10 July 2023; Thanh Hoa Stadium
Dong A Thanh Hoa (14)	1
Phu Dong (18)	0
10 July 2023; Pleiku Stadium
Hoang Anh Gia Lai (20)	1 (4)
PVF-CAND (24)	1 (5)

Semi-Finals
16 August 2023; Hang Day Stadium
Viettel (2)	1
Topenland Binh Dinh (8)	0
16 August 2023; Thanh Hoa Stadium
Dong A Thanh Hoa (14)	4
PVF-CAND (24)	1

Final
20 August 2023; Thanh Hoa Stadium
Viettel (2)	0 (3)
Dong A Thanh Hoa (14)	0 (5)

== Top goalscorers ==
Rank	Player	Club	Goals
1	Nhâm Mạnh Dũng	Viettel	3
2	Nguyễn Trần Việt Cường	Becamex Binh Duong	2
2	Vũ Quang Nam	Hong Linh Ha Tinh	2
2	(Brazil) Jeferson Elias	Viettel	2
5	Phan Tuấn Tài	Long An	1
5	Bùi Xuân Lộc	Phu Dong	1
5	Hoàng Vũ Samson	Ho Chi Minh City	1
5	Phan Nhật Thanh Long	Ba Ria-Vung Tau	1
5	Nguyễn Tiến Linh	Becamex Binh Duong	1
5	Lê Văn Hưng	Quang Nam	1
5	Hà Đức Chinh	Topenland Binh Dinh	1
5	Phạm Văn Thành	Topenland Binh Dinh	1
5	(Brazil) Rafaelson	Topenland Binh Dinh	1
5	Nguyễn Trung Học	Hong Linh Ha Tinh	1
5	Trịnh Văn Lợi	Dong A Thanh Hoa	1
5	Lê Văn Thắng	Dong A Thanh Hoa	1
5	Doãn Ngọc Tân	Dong A Thanh Hoa	1
5	Nguyễn Minh Tùng	Dong A Thanh Hoa	1
5	Lê Thanh Bình	Dong A Thanh Hoa	1
5	Nguyễn Hoàng Đức	Viettel	1
5	Phạm Tuấn Hải	Hanoi FC	1
5	Phạm Gia Hưng	PVF-CAND	1
5	Nguyễn Thanh Nhàn	PVF-CAND	1
5	Trần Ngọc Sơn	PVF-CAND	1
5	Nguyễn Quốc Việt	Hoang Anh Gia Lai	1
5	Nguyễn Tuấn Anh	Hoang Anh Gia Lai	1
