= 2020–21 APOEL FC season =

APOEL
2020–21 season
- Chairman: Prodromos Petrides
- Manager: Marinos Ouzounidis (until 28 October 2020); Mick McCarthy (from 2 November 2020); Savvas Poursaitidis (from January 6 2021)
- Stadium: GSP Stadium, Nicosia
- Cypriot First Division: 8th
- Cypriot Cup: Semi-finals
- UEFA Europa League: Play-off round
Home colours	Away colours	Third colours

The 2020–21 season was APOEL's 81st season in the Cypriot First Division and 93rd year in existence as a football club. In addition to the domestic league, APOEL participated in this season's editions of the Cypriot Cup and the Europa League. The season covered the period from July 2020 to 30 June 2021.

== Players ==
As of 11 September 2020

Note: Flags indicate national team as defined under FIFA eligibility rules; some limited exceptions apply. Players may hold more than one non-FIFA nationality.

No.	Pos.	Nation	Player
1	GK	(Portugal) POR	Miguel Silva
2	DF	(Greece) GRE	Kostas Apostolakis
3	DF	(Hungary) HUN	Paulo Vinícius
4	DF	(Brazil) BRA	Rafael Santos (on loan from Flamengo)
5	MF	(Brazil) BRA	Carlos Dias
6	DF	(Portugal) POR	Artur Jorge
7	MF	(Cyprus) CYP	Georgios Efrem
8	MF	(Norway) NOR	Marius Lundemo
9	FW	(Kosovo) KOS	Atdhe Nuhiu
10	MF	(Argentina) ARG	Tomás De Vincenti
12	GK	(Cyprus) CYP	Dimitris Priniotakis
14	FW	(Israel) ISR	Ben Sahar (on loan from Hapoel Be'er Sheva)
15	MF	(Morocco) MAR	Anuar Tuhami (on loan from Valladolid)
16	FW	(Cyprus) CYP	Andreas Katsantonis
17	MF	(Norway) NOR	Ghayas Zahid
18	MF	(Cyprus) CYP	Giannis Satsias

No.	Pos.	Nation	Player
20	FW	(Belgium) BEL	Victor Klonaridis
22	DF	(Equatorial Guinea) EQG	Emilio Nsue
23	GK	(Nigeria) NGA	Francis Uzoho
25	MF	(Cyprus) CYP	Stavros Gavriel
27	MF	(Israel) ISR	Omer Atzili
29	MF	(Republic of Ireland) IRL	Jack Byrne
30	DF	(Cyprus) CYP	Giorgos Merkis
31	MF	(Denmark) DEN	Mike Jensen
40	MF	(Cyprus) CYP	Marios Kokkinoftas
42	DF	(Cyprus) CYP	Christos Wheeler
55	DF	(Cyprus) CYP	Christos Shelis
75	GK	(Greece) GRE	Apostolos Tsilingiris
77	MF	(Democratic Republic of the Congo) COD	Dieumerci Ndongala
80	GK	(Cyprus) CYP	Charis Hadjigavriel
89	FW	(Cyprus) CYP	Nikolas Koutsakos

=== Out on loan ===
Note: Flags indicate national team as defined under FIFA eligibility rules; some limited exceptions apply. Players may hold more than one non-FIFA nationality.

No.	Pos.	Nation	Player
—	MF	(Jordan) JOR	Omar Hani (at Olympiakos Nicosia until 30 June 2021)
—	GK	(Cyprus) CYP	Neofytos Michael (at Olympiakos Nicosia until 30 June 2021)
—	DF	(Serbia) SRB	Vujadin Savić (at Olimpija Ljubljana until 30 June 2021)

== Competitions ==
=== Cypriot First Division ===
==== League table ====
Pos	Team	Pld	W	D	L	GF	GA	GD	Pts	Qualification or relegation
6	Olympiakos Nicosia	26	10	4	12	27	38	−11	34	Qualification for the Championship round
7	Pafos FC	26	8	8	10	30	27	+3	32	Qualification for the Relegation round
8	APOEL	26	8	6	12	27	31	−4	30 (Note: Head-to-head goal difference: APOEL +1, Doxa -1)	Qualification for the Relegation round
9	Doxa Katokopias	26	7	9	10	24	32	−8	30	Qualification for the Relegation round
10	Nea Salamis Famagusta	26	8	5	13	29	38	−9	29	Qualification for the Relegation round

Source: Cyprus Football Association
Rules for classification: 1) Points; 2) Head-to-head points; 3) Head-to-head goal difference; 4) Head-to-head goals scored; 5) Head-to-head away goals scored (only if two teams); 6) Goal difference; 7) Goals scored; 8) Play-off (only if deciding championship round, relegation round or relegation).
Notes:

Pos	Team	Pld	W	D	L	GF	GA	GD	Pts	Relegation	PAF	APOE	ETH	DOX	NSF	ERM	ENP	KAR
7	Pafos FC	40	18	9	13	58	38	+20	63		—	1–1	1–2	2–1	3–0	3–1	2–0	2–1
8	APOEL	40	17	9	14	48	39	+9	60		0–1	—	2–0	1–0	0–0	2–0	1–0	2–0
9	Ethnikos Achna	40	14	10	16	48	56	−8	52		0–2	1–1	—	2–1	2–2	2–0	1–0	5–0
10	Doxa Katokopias	40	13	12	15	46	43	+3	51		1–0	1–2	0–1	—	0–0	1–1	1–0	6–1
11	Nea Salamis Famagusta (R)	40	11	10	19	48	61	−13	43	Relegation to Cypriot Second Division	1–2	1–2	0–2	1–4	—	3–1	1–2	1–1
12	Ermis Aradippou (R)	40	9	11	20	40	61	−21	38	Relegation to Cypriot Second Division	1–2	2–0	1–2	0–1	1–2	—	4–2	7–1
13	Enosis Neon Paralimni (R)	40	8	10	22	35	61	−26	34	Relegation to Cypriot Second Division	2–1	0–1	1–1	0–0	3–3	0–1	—	1–1
14	Karmiotissa (R)	40	4	12	24	36	98	−62	24	Relegation to Cypriot Second Division	0–6	1–6	2–4	0–5	0–4	2–2	4–2	—

Source: Cyprus Football Association
Rules for classification: 1) Points; 2) Head-to-head points; 3) Head-to-head goal difference; 4) Head-to-head goals scored; 5) Head-to-head away goals scored (only if two teams); 6) Goal difference; 7) Goals scored; 8) Play-off (only if deciding champion or UEFA competitions).
(R) Relegated

==== Results summary ====
Overall								Home						Away					
Pld	W	D	L	GF	GA	GD	Pts	W	D	L	GF	GA	GD	W	D	L	GF	GA	GD
3	1	1	1	3	5	−2	4	1	1	0	3	2	+1	0	0	1	0	3	−3

Last updated: 12 September 2020.

==== Results by round ====
Round	1	2	3	4	5	6	7	8	9	10	11	12	13	14	15	16	17	18	19	20	21	22	23	24	25	26
Ground	H	A	H	A	H	A	H	A	H	A	H	A	H	A	H	A	H	A	H	A	H	A	H	A	H	A
Result	D	L	W	W	W	D	L	L	D	D	L	W	L	L	D	L	L	L	W	W	D	L				
Position	5	11	7	7	3	5	6	9	9	9	9	8	9	9	9	9	10	10	10	10	9	10				

Updated to match(es) played on September 2020. Source:
A = Away; H = Home; W = Win; D = Draw; L = Loss

=== UEFA Europa League ===
27 August 2020 First qualifying round	Gjilani (Kosovo)	0–2 (a.e.t.)	(Cyprus) APOEL	Fadil Vokrri Stadium, Pristina (Note: Gjilani will play their home match against APOEL at Fadil Vokrri Stadium, Pristina, instead of their regular stadium City Stadium, Gjilan, which is under reconstruction.)
19:00		Report	Efrem 102'; Ndongala 116'	Attendance: 0 Referee: Yigal Frid (Israel)

17 September 2020 Second qualifying round	Kaisar (Kazakhstan)	1–4	(Cyprus) APOEL	Kazhymukan Munaitpasov Stadium, Shymkent (Note: Kaisar will play their home match against APOEL at Kazhymukan Munaitpasov Stadium, Shymkent, instead of their regular stadium Gani Muratbayev Stadium, Kyzylorda.)
14:00 (18:00 ALMT)		Report		Referee: Jens Maae (Denmark)

27 September 2020 Third qualifying round	APOEL (Cyprus)	2–2 (a.e.t.) (4–2 p)	(Bosnia and Herzegovina) Zrinjski Mostar	GSP Stadium, Nicosia
18:00 (21:00 UTC+03:00)	Atzili 14'; Nuhiu 26'	Report	Ivančić 11'; Bilbija 69'	Referee: Daniel Stefański (Poland)
	Penalties
	Jensen (penalty scored); Atzili (penalty missed); Sahar (penalty scored); Al-Taamari (penalty scored); De Vincenti (penalty scored)		(penalty scored) Filipović; (penalty missed) Ibáñez; (penalty missed) Bilbija; (penalty scored) Govedarica

== Statistics ==
=== Goalscorers ===
As of 12 September 2020

Rank	No.	Pos	Nat	Name	First Division	Cypriot Cup	UEFA Europa League	Total
1	41	FW		Joe Garner	8	0	0	8
5	4	DF	(Brazil)	Rafael Santos	1	0	0	1
	7	MF	(Cyprus)	Georgios Efrem	1	0	1	2
	14	FW	(Israel)	Ben Sahar	5	0	0	1
	77	MF	(Democratic Republic of the Congo)	Dieumerci Ndongala	2	0	1	1
Own goals					1	0	0	1
Totals					3	0	2	5
