= Hoàng Minh Tuấn =

Vietnamese footballer (born 1995)

Personal information
- Full name: Hoàng Minh Tuấn
- Date of birth: 26 August 1995 (age 31)
- Place of birth: Quỳnh Phụ, Thái Bình, Việt Nam
- Height: 1.77 m (5 ft 10 in)
- Position: Striker

Team information
- Current team: Xuân Thiện Phú Thọ
- Number: 99

Youth career
- 2012–2014: Nam Định

Senior career*
Years	Team	Apps	(Gls)
2014–2025	Thép Xanh Nam Định	87	(5)
2019	→ Phù Đổng (loan)	10	(0)
2022	→ Sài Gòn (loan)	15	(0)
2025–	Xuân Thiện Phú Thọ	16	(1)

International career
2018	Vietnam U-23	1	(0)
- * Club domestic league appearances and goals as of 6 June 2026

Hoàng Minh Tuấn (born 26 August 1995) is a Vietnamese professional footballer who plays as a striker for V.League 2 club Xuân Thiện Phú Thọ.

== Club career ==
In 2014, Minh Tuấn was promoted to Thép Xanh Nam Định first team in V.League 2. Although the club won the promotion to V.League 1, he still had a bad seasons when playing as a center-back. In 2016, he was repositioned as a striker, became one of the most important player in Nam Định with Lê Sỹ Minh.

In 2022, Minh Tuấn joined Sài Gòn on loan.

On 2 August 2025, Minh Tuấn left Nam Định.

== International career ==
In 2018, after a great season in V.League 1, Minh Tuấn was called up for the Vietnam U23 by Park Hang-seo.

== Honours ==
Thép Xanh Nam Định

- V.League 1: 2023–24, 2024–25
- Vietnamese Super Cup: 2024
- V.League 2: 2017
