= Ngô Quang Trường =

Vietnamese football manager (born 1972)

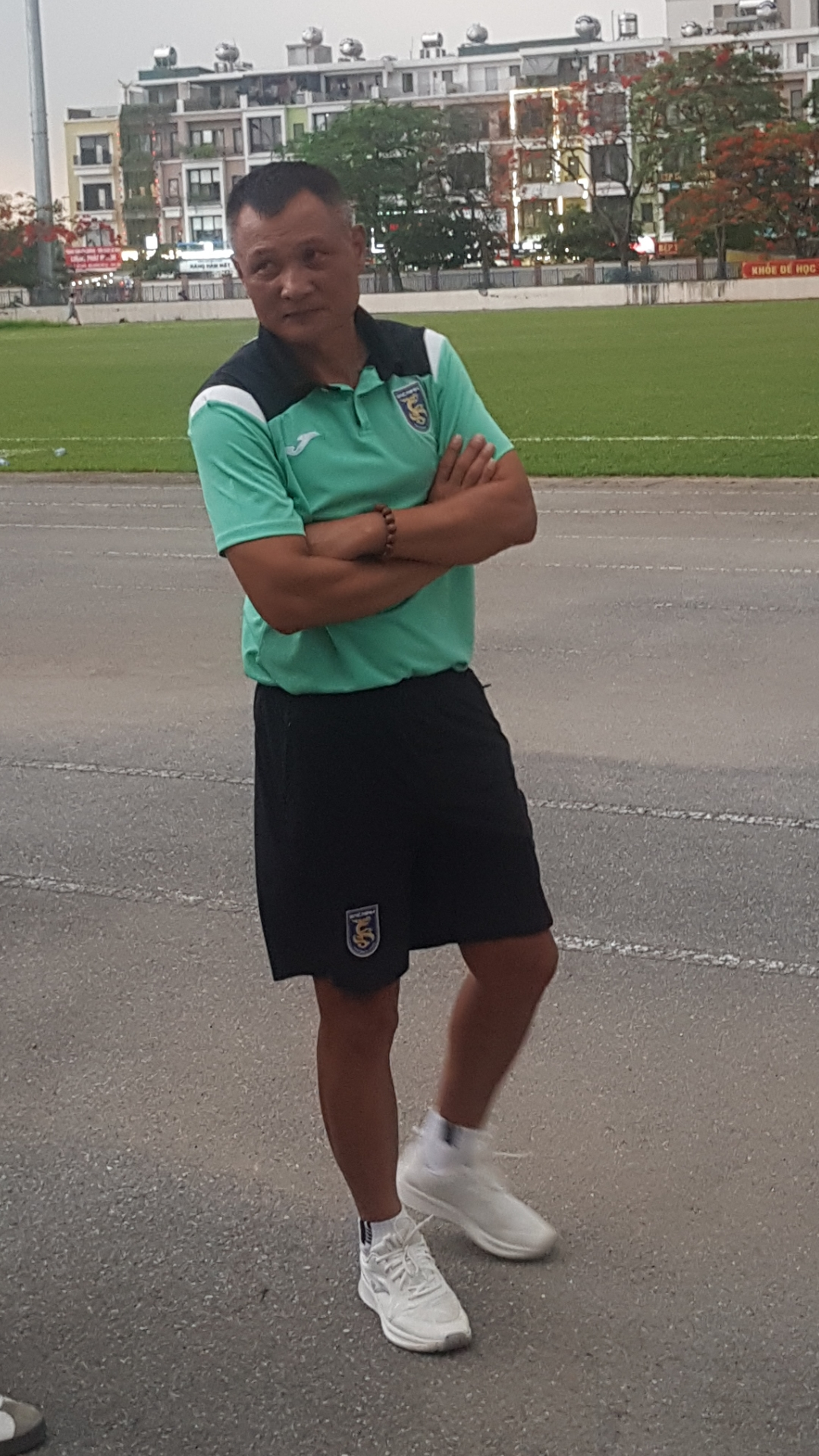
- Quang Trường in 2024

Personal information
- Date of birth: 21 January 1972 (age 54)
- Place of birth: Nghệ An, North Vietnam
- Height: 1.65 m (5 ft 5 in)
- Position: Midfielder

Youth career
- 1985–1992: Sông Lam Nghệ An

Senior career*
Years	Team	Apps	(Gls)
1993–2003	Sông Lam Nghệ An	82	(24)

International career
1996–2002	Vietnam	13	(3)

Managerial career
- 2014–2016: Sông Lam Nghệ An
- 2019–2021: Sông Lam Nghệ An
- 2024–: Bắc Ninh
- * Club domestic league appearances and goals

Ngô Quang Trường (born 21 January 1972) is a Vietnamese football manager and former player who manages Bắc Ninh.

== Career ==
Ngô spent his entire playing career with Vietnamese side SLNA and played for the Vietnam national team before working as a manager after retiring from professional football.
