= Nguyễn Minh Tùng =

Vietnamese footballer

Personal information
- Full name: Nguyễn Minh Tùng
- Date of birth: 9 August 1992 (age 34)
- Place of birth: Đông Sơn, Thanh Hóa, Vietnam
- Height: 1.82 m (6 ft 0 in)
- Position: Centre-back

Team information
- Current team: Bắc Ninh
- Number: 36

Youth career
- 2002–2006: Thanh Hóa

Senior career*
Years	Team	Apps	(Gls)
2007–2013	Thanh Hóa	16	(6)
2013–2014	Vissai Ninh Bình	15	(0)
2014–2015	An Giang	4	(0)
2015–2018	Than Quảng Ninh	39	(0)
2018–2023	Thanh Hóa	102	(2)
2023–2024	Hồ Chí Minh City	21	(0)
2024–2026	Thể Công-Viettel	22	(0)
2026–	Bắc Ninh	1	(0)

International career^{‡}
2014–2015	Vietnam U23	3	(0)
2014–2016	Vietnam	4	(0)
- * Club domestic league appearances and goals as of 20 September 2026 ‡ National team caps and goals as of 6 October 2016

Nguyễn Minh Tùng (Note: In this Vietnamese name, the surname is Nguyễn, but is often simplified to Nguyen in English-language text. In accordance with Vietnamese custom, this person should be referred to by the given name, Minh Tùng.) (born 9 August 1992) is a Vietnamese professional footballer who plays as a centre-back for V.League 1 club Bắc Ninh.

Minh Tung made his full international debut for Vietnam in 2014, and earned 4 caps over three years.

== Career statistics ==
=== International ===
As of match played 6 October 2016

Appearances and goals by national team and year
National team	Year	Apps	Goals
Vietnam	2014	2	0
Vietnam	2015	1	0
Vietnam	2016	1	0
Total		4	0

== Honours ==
Vissai Ninh Bình

- Vietnamese Cup: 2013
- Vietnamese Super Cup: 2013

Than Quảng Ninh

- Vietnamese Cup: 2016
- Vietnamese Super Cup: 2016

Đông Á Thanh Hóa

- Vietnamese Cup: 2023

Vietnam U23

- SEA Games bronze medal: 2015
