= Nguyễn Hải Huy =

Vietnamese footballer

Personal information
- Full name: Nguyễn Hải Huy
- Date of birth: 18 June 1991 (age 35)
- Place of birth: Hạ Long, Quảng Ninh, Vietnam
- Height: 1.72 m (5 ft 8 in)
- Position: Midfielder

Team information
- Current team: Bắc Ninh
- Number: 14

Youth career
- 2002–2007: Than Quảng Ninh

Senior career*
Years	Team	Apps	(Gls)
2008–2022	Than Quảng Ninh	258	(48)
2022–2023	Hải Phòng	42	(9)
2023–2025	Becamex Bình Dương	35	(1)
2025–	Bắc Ninh	18	(2)

International career^{‡}
2010–2011	Vietnam U19	13	(2)
2012–2013	Vietnam U21	12	(4)
2013–2015	Vietnam U23	12	(3)
2022–2023	Vietnam	2	(0)
- * Club domestic league appearances and goals as of 12 September 2026 ‡ National team caps and goals as of 15 June 2023

Nguyễn Hải Huy (born 18 June 1991) is a Vietnamese professional footballer who plays as a midfielder for V.League 1 club Bắc Ninh. He appeared twice with the Vietnam national team between 2022 and 2023.

== Club career ==
Hải Huy came from the youth training academy of Than Quảng Ninh. He played an important role in helping Than Quảng Ninh win promotion to the V.League in 2014. That season, at the age of 23, Hải Huy scored 7 goals.

On June 6, 2020, in the match between Quang Ninh and Hong Linh Ha Tinh in the third round, Hai Huy suffered a broken fibula after a collision with an opposing player. The serious injury forced him to miss the entire season and he was only able to return in the V.League 2021. After 14 years at Than Quang Ninh, he signed for Haiphong FC in 2022. After leaving the club in 2023, Hai Huy signed for Becamex Binh Duong.

== International career ==
Overlooked for selection by Vietnam during his spell in Than Quang Ninh, Hai Huy won his first full cap on 14 December 2022, replacing Phạm Tuấn Hải for the last 30 minutes of the 1–0 friendly win over Philippines in Hanoi.

== Career statistics ==
=== International ===
As of match played 15 June 2023

Appearances and goals by national team and year
National team	Year	Apps	Goals
Vietnam	2022	1	0
Vietnam	2023	1	0
Total		2	0

== Honours ==
Than Quang Ninh

- Vietnamese National Cup: 2016
- Vietnamese Super Cup: 2016

Haiphong FC

- V.League 1 runner-ups: 2022
