= Ngô Viết Phú =

Vietnamese footballer

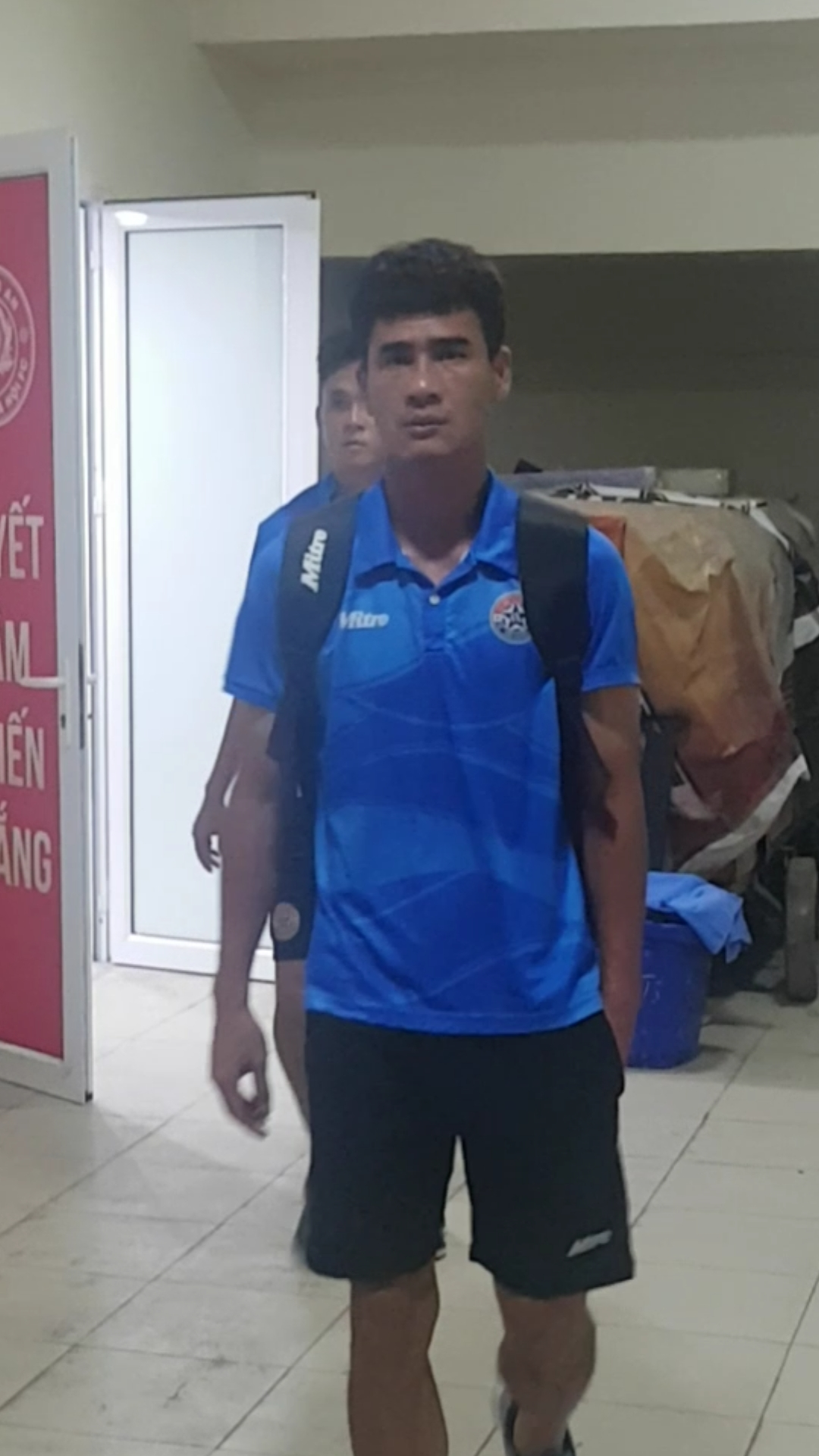
- Viết Phú in 2024

Personal information
- Full name: Ngô Viết Phú
- Date of birth: 2 January 1992 (age 34)
- Place of birth: Bà Rịa-Vũng Tàu, Vietnam
- Height: 1.80 m (5 ft 11 in)
- Position: Midfielder

Team information
- Current team: PVF-CAND
- Number: 5

Youth career
- 2003–2005: Bà Rịa-Vũng Tàu

Senior career*
Years	Team	Apps	(Gls)
2006–2012	Bà Rịa - Vũng Tàu	32	(0)
2013–2017	Bình Phước	47	(8)
2018–2019	SHB Đà Nẵng	11	(1)
2020	Hồ Chí Minh City	5	(2)
2021–2022	Bà Rịa-Vũng Tàu	21	(0)
2023–	PVF-CAND	8	(0)
- * Club domestic league appearances and goals as of 17 June 2020

Ngô Viết Phú (born 2 January 1992) is a Vietnamese footballer who plays for V.League 2 club PVF-CAND.

== Honours ==
PVF-CAND

- V.League 2 runner-up: (silver) 2023
- Vietnamese National Cup third place : (bronze) 2023
