= David Fisher (footballer) =

British football player

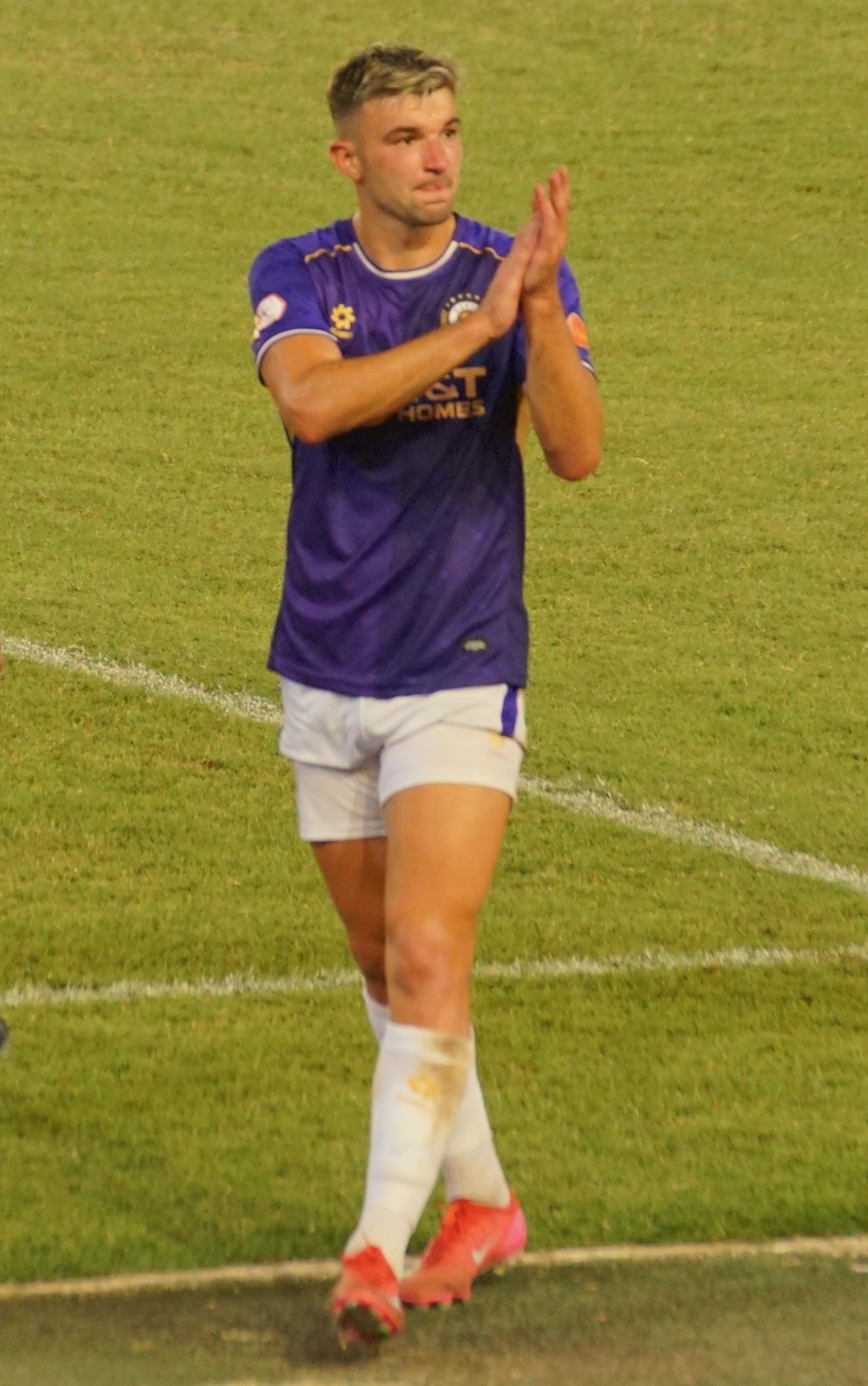
- Fisher in 2026

Personal information
- Date of birth: 9 December 2001 (age 24)
- Place of birth: Reigate, England
- Height: 1.78 m (5 ft 10 in)
- Positions: Winger; forward

Team information
- Current team: Bac Ninh
- Number: 10

Youth career
- –2019: AFC Wimbledon

Senior career*
| Years | Team | Apps | (Gls) |
| 2019–2023 | AFC Wimbledon | 3 | (0) |
| 2019–2020 | → South Park (loan) | 10 | (1) |
| 2020 | → Carshalton Athletic (loan) | 3 | (1) |
| 2020–2023 | → Hampton & Richmond Borough (loan) | 52 | (10) |
| 2023–2026 | Glentoran | 70 | (18) |
| 2026 | Hanoi FC | 15 | (4) |
| 2026– | Bac Ninh | 6 | (1) |
- * Club domestic league appearances and goals as of 7 June 2026

David Fisher (born 9 December 2001) is an English professional footballer who plays as a forward for V.League 1 club Bac Ninh.

== Career ==
Fisher began his career at the age of 8 in the youth team of AFC Wimbledon. He gradually rose through the youth teams. He gained his first experience of adult football on loan at South Park FC. Fisher joined Carshalton Athletic on loan and scored a hat trick in the FA Cup within a haul of 6 goals in as many games, before non-league football was interrupted by the COVID-19 pandemic in 2020. He then went to Hampton & Richmond Borough in November 2020, but Wimbledon kept his player registration.

Fisher made his professional debut for Wimbledon in the EFL Cup at home at Plough Lane against Gillingham on 9 August 2022. He was released at the end of the 2022–23 season.

On 1 September 2023, Fisher signed for Irish Premiership side Glentoran on one-year deal, playing under manager Warren Feeney. After a successful first season in which he scored 14 goals across all competitions, Fisher extended his contract with the club. In the 2024/2025 season, Fisher won the County Antrim Shield with the club, starting in 4 of the 5 matches, including the final.

On 8 January 2026, Fisher joined V.League 1 club Hanoi FC. On 3 September, he was transferred to league fellow Bac Ninh.

== Personal life ==
Fisher has a Czech mother and an English father and holds both a Czech and a British passport.

== Career statistics ==
As of matches played 2 May 2024

| Club | Season | Division | League | | FA Cup | | League Cup | | Other | | Total | |
| Club | Season | Division | Apps | Goals | Apps | Goals | Apps | Goals | Apps | Goals | Apps | Goals |
|---|---|---|---|---|---|---|---|---|---|---|---|---|
| AFC Wimbledon | 2022–23 | League Two | 3 | 0 | 2 | 0 | 1 | 0 | 2 | 0 | 8 | 0 |
| AFC Wimbledon | Total | | 3 | 0 | 2 | 0 | 1 | 0 | 2 | 0 | 8 | 0 |
| Glentoran | 2023-24 | Irish Premiership | 26 | 11 | 0 | 0 | 0 | 0 | 1 | 0 | 27 | 11 |
| Career Total | | | 29 | 11 | 2 | 0 | 1 | 0 | 3 | 0 | 35 | 11 |

== Honours ==
Glentoran

- County Antrim Shield: 2024–25
