= Vũ Hồng Quân =

Vietnamese footballer

Personal information
- Full name: Vũ Hồng Quân
- Date of birth: 3 October 1999 (age 27)
- Place of birth: Đầm Hà, Quảng Ninh, Vietnam
- Height: 1.71 m (5 ft 7 in)
- Position: Midfielder

Team information
- Current team: Bắc Ninh
- Number: 5

Youth career
- –2020: Than Quảng Ninh

Senior career*
Years	Team	Apps	(Gls)
2018–2021	Than Quảng Ninh	10	(0)
2018	→ Lâm Đồng (loan)	?	(1)
2019	→ Phù Đổng (loan)	6	(0)
2021–2022	Sài Gòn	2	(0)
2022	→ FC Ryukyu (loan)	0	(0)
2023	Hòa Bình	10	(1)
2023–2024	Đông Á Thanh Hóa	0	(0)
2025–	Bắc Ninh	33	(3)
- * Club domestic league appearances and goals as of 13 September 2026

Vũ Hồng Quân (born 3 October 1999) is a Vietnamese professional footballer who currently plays as a midfielder for V.League 1 club Bắc Ninh.

== Career ==
Hồng Quân played for Than Quảng Ninh's youth team, before making his first team debut in the 2020 season. He signed for Sài Gòn in October 2021 and was loaned out to FC Ryukyu for a season.

In March 2025, Hồng Quân signed for Bắc Ninh.

== Career statistics ==
As of match played 13 September 2026

Appearances and goals by club, season and competition
Club	Season	League			Cup (Note: Includes Vietnamese Cup and Emperor's Cup)		Continental		Other		Total	
Club	Season	Division	Apps	Goals	Apps	Goals	Apps	Goals	Apps	Goals	Apps	Goals
Than Quang Ninh	2020	V.League 1	1	0	0	0	0	0	—		1	0
Than Quang Ninh	2021	V.League 1	9	0	0	0	—		—		9	0
Than Quang Ninh	Total		10	0	0	0	0	0	0	0	10	0
Sài Gòn	2022	V.League 1	0	0	0	0	—		—		0	0
FC Ryukyu (loan)	2022	J2 League	0	0	1	0	—		0	0	1	0
Hòa Bình	2023	V.League 2	10	1	0	0	—		—		10	1
Đông Á Thanh Hóa	2023–24	V.League 1	0	0	0	0	—		—		0	0
Bắc Ninh	2025	Second Division	12	2	—		—		—		12	2
Bắc Ninh	2025–26	V.League 2	19	1	3	0	—		1	0	23	1
Bắc Ninh	2026–27	V.League 1	2	0	0	0	—		—		2	0
Bắc Ninh	Total		33	2	3	0	0	0	1	0	37	3
Career total			53	4	4	0	0	0	1	0	58	4

== Honours ==
Đông Á Thanh Hóa

- Vietnamese Cup: 2023–24
