= Lương Hoàng Nam =

Vietnamese footballer (born 1997)

Personal information
- Full name: Lương Hoàng Nam
- Date of birth: 2 March 1997 (age 29)
- Place of birth: Buôn Đôn, Đắk Lắk, Vietnam
- Height: 1.60 m (5 ft 3 in)
- Positions: Winger; central midfielder

Team information
- Current team: Bắc Ninh
- Number: 30

Youth career
- 2007–2014: Hoàng Anh Gia Lai

Senior career*
Years	Team	Apps	(Gls)
2015–2022	Hoàng Anh Gia Lai	16	(2)
2017	→ Long An (loan)	10	(0)
2018–2018	→ Hải Phòng (loan)	15	(0)
2020–2022	→ Công An Nhân Dân (loan)	23	(0)
2023–2026	Hải Phòng	76	(6)
2026–	Bắc Ninh	1	(0)

International career
2015–2017	Vietnam U20	17	(0)
2019–2020	Vietnam U23	1	(0)
- * Club domestic league appearances and goals as of 7 November 2026

Hoàng Phương Nam (born 2 March 1997) is a Vietnamese footballer who plays as a winger or central midfielder for V.League 1 club Bắc Ninh.

With Vietnam U20, he participated in the 2017 FIFA U-20 World Cup.

== Honours ==
Công An Nhân Dân

- V.League 2: 2022
