= Rafael Santos (footballer, born 2 February 1998) =

Brazilian footballer

Personal information
- Full name: Rafael Santos de Sousa
- Date of birth: 2 February 1998 (age 28)
- Place of birth: Guarujá, Brazil
- Height: 1.90 m (6 ft 3 in)
- Position: Centre-back

Team information
- Current team: Bac Ninh
- Number: 99

Youth career
- Flamengo

Senior career*
Years	Team	Apps	(Gls)
2018–2022	Flamengo	5	(0)
2020–2022	→ APOEL (loan)	22	(1)
2022–2024	Moreirense	14	(1)
2024	Santa Clara	9	(0)
2024–2026	Leixoes	31	(0)
2026–	Bac Ninh	1	(0)
- * Club domestic league appearances and goals as of 5 September 2026

Rafael Santos de Sousa (born 2 February 1998), known as Rafael Santos, is a Brazilian professional footballer who plays as a centre-back for V.League 1 club Bac Ninh.

== Career ==
=== Flamengo ===
On 5 May 2019 Santos debuted for Flamengo in a Campeonato Brasileiro Série A match at Estádio do Morumbi against São Paulo, he came to the match as a substitute as head coach Abel Braga fielded the whole team with reserves, the match ended 1–1.

==== APOEL (loan) ====
On 29 May 2020 APOEL signed Santos from Flamengo on loan until May 2022. On 21 August 2020 he debuted in a Cypriot First Division 2-2 match against Karmiotissa FC, Santos scored APOEL's second goal.

=== Moreirense ===
On 27 July 2022, Santos joined Liga Portugal 2 club Moreirense, signing a three-year contract with an option for a further year. In his debut season, he scored 1 goal in 14 league appearances, as the Moreira de Cónegos-based side were crowned second division champions and achieved promotion to the Primeira Liga.

=== Santa Clara ===
On 29 January 2024, Santos, who had failed to make any appearances for Moreirense in the Primeira Liga, returned to the Liga Portugal 2, signing a two-and-a-half-year contract with Azores-based side Santa Clara.

=== Bac Ninh ===
In August 2026, Santos moved to Vietnam, joining newly promoted V.League 1 side Bac Ninh.

== Career statistics ==
=== Club ===
As of 7 February 2023

Appearances and goals by club, season and competition
Club	Season	League			State league		National cup		League cup		Continental		Other		Total	
Club	Season	Division	Apps	Goals	Apps	Goals	Apps	Goals	Apps	Goals	Apps	Goals	Apps	Goals	Apps	Goals
Flamengo	2018	Série A	0	0	—		0	0	—		—		—		0	0
Flamengo	2019	Série A	1	0	0	0	0	0	—		0	0	—		1	0
Flamengo	2020	Série A	0	0	4 (Note: Appearance(s) in Campeonato Carioca.)	0	0	0	0	0	—		4	0		
Flamengo	Total		1	0	4	0	0	0	0	0	0	0	—		5	0
APOEL (loan)	2020–21	First Division	19	1	—		4	0	—		3 (Note: Appearance(s) in UEFA Europa League.)	0	—		26	1
APOEL (loan)	2021–22	First Division	3	0	—		0	0	—		—		—		3	0
APOEL (loan)	Total		22	1	—		4	0	0	0	3	0	—		29	1
Moreirense	2022–23	Liga Portugal 2	10	0	—		1	0	2	0	—		—		13	0
Career total			33	1	4	0	5	0	1	0	3	0	0	0	47	1

== Honours ==
Flamengo

- Campeonato Brasileiro Série A: 2019
- Campeonato Carioca: 2019

Moreirense

- Liga Portugal 2: 2022–23
