= Lê Văn Xuân =

Vietnamese footballer (born 1999)

Personal information
- Full name: Lê Văn Xuân
- Date of birth: 27 February 1999 (age 27)
- Place of birth: Hậu Lộc, Thanh Hóa, Vietnam
- Height: 1.68 m (5 ft 6 in)
- Position: Full-back

Team information
- Current team: Bắc Ninh
- Number: 45

Youth career
- 2010–2018: PVF

Senior career*
Years	Team	Apps	(Gls)
2018–2020	Hồng Lĩnh Hà Tĩnh	16	(1)
2020–2026	Hà Nội	89	(1)
2026–	Bắc Ninh	0	(0)

International career^{‡}
2021–2022	Vietnam U23	7	(1)
2021–2022	Vietnam	4	(0)
Medal record
Men's football
Representing Vietnam
SEA Games
Gold medal – first place	Hanoi 2021	Team
- * Club domestic league appearances and goals as of 7 June 2026 ‡ National team caps and goals as of 6 October 2022

Lê Văn Xuân (born 27 February 1999) is a Vietnamese professional footballer who plays as a full-back for V.League 1 club Bắc Ninh. He appeared 4 times for the Vietnam national team between 2021 and 2022.

== Career statistics ==
=== International ===
As of match played 24 March 2022

Appearances and goals by national team and year
National team	Year	Apps	Goals
Vietnam	2021	1	0
Vietnam	2022	2	0
Total		3	0

== Honours ==
Hà Nội

- V.League 1: 2022; Runner-up 2020
- Vietnamese National Cup: 2020
- Vietnamese Super Cup: 2020, 2021

Vietnam U23

- SEA Games gold medal: 2021
