= 2023–24 Cypriot First Division =

Cypriot football league season

Cyta Championship
- Season: 2023–24
- Dates: 18 August 2023 – 12 May 2024
- Champions: APOEL; 29th title
- Relegated: AEZ Zakakiou; Doxa Katokopias; Othellos Athienou
- UEFA Champions League: APOEL
- UEFA Europa League: Pafos
- UEFA Conference League: AEK Larnaca; Omonia
- Matches: 142
- Goals: 403 (2.84 per match)
- Top goalscorer: Marios Ilia; Andreas Katsantonis (19 goals each)
- Biggest home win: APOEL 6–0 Othellos Athienou (21 January 2024)
- Biggest away win: AEZ Zakakiou 0–5 Aris Limassol (3 September 2023); AEZ Zakakiou 0–5 Apollon Limassol (22 October 2023)
- Highest scoring: Karmiotissa 6–6 Othellos (24 April 2024)
- Longest winning run: 7 matches APOEL
- Longest unbeaten run: 13 matches AEK Larnaca
- Longest winless run: 21 matches AEZ Zakakiou
- Longest losing run: 11 matches Doxa Katokopias
- All statistics correct as of 10 April 2024.

The 2023–24 Cypriot First Division was the 85th season of the Cypriot top-level football league. Aris Limassol were the defending champions, having won their first title in the 2022–23 season.

The winners (APOEL, their twenty-ninth title win) qualified for the second qualifying round of the 2024–25 UEFA Champions League. The 2023–24 Cypriot Cup winners (Pafos) qualified for the first qualifying round of the 2024–25 UEFA Europa League. The runners-up (AEK Larnaca) and third-placed team (Omonia) qualified for the second qualifying round of the 2024–25 UEFA Conference League. The bottom three teams (Doxa Katokopias, Othellos Athienou, and AEZ Zakakiou) were relegated to the 2024–25 Cypriot Second Division.

== Changes from previous season ==
ENP, Akritas Chlorakas (both clubs relegated after a single season in top flight), and Olympiakos Nicosia (relegated for the first time since 2012-13) were relegated in the previous season. They have been replaced by Othellos Athienou (promoted after a 8 seasons absence), AEZ Zakakiou (promoted after a 6 seasons absence), and Ethnikos Achna (promoted after a single season of absence), who were the top three teams in the 2022–23 Cypriot Second Division.

== Stadiums and locations ==
Locations of the 2023–24 Cypriot First Division teams.

Note: Table lists clubs in alphabetical order.

Team	Location	Stadium	Capacity
AEK Larnaca	Larnaca	AEK Arena	7,400
AEL Limassol	Limassol	Alphamega Stadium	10,700
AEZ Zakakiou	Zakaki, Limassol	Ammochostos Stadium	5,500
Anorthosis Famagusta	Famagusta	Antonis Papadopoulos Stadium	10,230
APOEL	Nicosia	GSP Stadium	22,859
Apollon Limassol	Limassol	Alphamega Stadium	10,700
Aris Limassol	Limassol	Alphamega Stadium	10,700
Doxa Katokopias	Katokopia, Nicosia	Katokopia Stadium	3,500
Ethnikos Achna	Achna, Famagusta	Dasaki Stadium	7,000
Karmiotissa	Pano Polemidia, Limassol	Stelios Kyriakides Stadium	9,394
Nea Salamis Famagusta	Famagusta	Ammochostos Stadium	5,500
Omonia	Nicosia	GSP Stadium	22,859
Othellos Athienou	Athienou, Larnaca	Ammochostos Stadium	5,500
Pafos FC	Paphos	Stelios Kyriakides Stadium	9,394

== Structure ==
The structure of the competition remains unchanged from the previous season. 14 teams will participate in the league. In the first round, known as Regular Season, all teams play each other home and away, for a total of 26 games each. In the second round, the league splits into two groups: Teams ranked 1–6 enter the Championship Playoffs, where they compete for the league title and places leading to European football, while teams ranked 7–14 enter the Relegation playoffs, where they compete to avoid relegation. The teams in each group play each other home and away, for a total of 10 or 14 games, depending on the group. Criteria such as points, goal difference, and head to head records are retained during the transition from first to second round. The team ranked first in the Championship Playoffs are declared champions, while the bottom three teams in the Relegation Playoffs are relegated to the Second Division.

== Regular season ==
=== League table ===
Pos	Team	Pld	W	D	L	GF	GA	GD	Pts	Qualification or relegation
1	APOEL	26	18	5	3	54	16	+38	59	Qualification for the Championship round
2	Aris Limassol	26	18	2	6	53	21	+32	56	Qualification for the Championship round
3	AEK Larnaca	26	15	7	4	44	26	+18	52	Qualification for the Championship round
4	Pafos	26	15	5	6	48	20	+28	50	Qualification for the Championship round
5	Omonia	26	14	7	5	49	30	+19	49	Qualification for the Championship round
6	Anorthosis Famagusta	26	14	5	7	38	23	+15	47	Qualification for the Championship round
7	Apollon Limassol	26	10	8	8	37	27	+10	38	Qualification for the Relegation round
8	Nea Salamis Famagusta	26	10	6	10	34	39	−5	36	Qualification for the Relegation round
9	AEL Limassol	26	9	3	14	34	45	−11	30	Qualification for the Relegation round
10	Ethnikos Achna	26	6	8	12	39	56	−17	26	Qualification for the Relegation round
11	Karmiotissa	26	5	5	16	31	53	−22	20	Qualification for the Relegation round
12	AEZ Zakakiou	26	2	10	14	28	59	−31	16	Qualification for the Relegation round
13	Othellos Athienou	26	3	6	17	20	52	−32	15	Qualification for the Relegation round
14	Doxa Katokopias	26	3	3	20	14	56	−42	12	Qualification for the Relegation round

Source: Soccerway
Rules for classification: 1) Points; 2) Head-to-head points; 3) Head-to-head goal difference; 4) Head-to-head goals scored; 5) Head-to-head away goals scored (only if two teams); 6) Goal difference; 7) Goals scored; 8) Play-off (only if deciding championship round, relegation round or relegation).

=== Results ===
Home \ Away	AEK	AEL	AEZ	ANO	APOE	APOL	ARI	DOX	ETH	KAR	NSF	OMO	OTH	PAF
AEK Larnaca	—	3–0	2–0	1–0	0–3	1–2	2–1	2–1	5–5	5–0	1–1	2–1	3–2	1–0
AEL Limassol	2–3	—	4–3	1–3	1–1	1–3	0–4	2–0	1–1	2–1	3–1	0–0	2–1	1–2
AEZ Zakakiou	3–1	1–4	—	0–2	0–2	0–5	0–5	1–1	1–1	1–2	2–2	0–0	3–3	1–4
Anorthosis Famagusta	0–0	1–0	1–1	—	1–1	2–0	2–3	0–2	3–1	1–0	2–2	2–0	2–1	2–2
APOEL	2–2	1–0	3–1	1–0	—	1–1	1–0	5–0	5–1	4–1	1–0	3–0	6–0	1–0
Apollon Limassol	0–1	2–0	0–0	0–1	2–2	—	0–1	4–0	0–0	1–0	0–2	1–2	1–1	0–3
Aris Limassol	2–0	4–0	1–0	2–1	1–0	0–1	—	2–1	2–0	3–0	2–1	2–0	4–0	1–1
Doxa Katokopias	0–2	0–1	1–3	0–2	0–1	0–3	2–0	—	0–2	2–2	0–3	1–3	0–2	1–0
Ethnikos Achna	0–3	1–0	4–1	0–1	2–1	2–2	2–6	2–0	—	3–0	2–3	2–2	1–1	1–4
Karmiotissa	1–3	1–3	1–1	1–3	1–2	3–4	4–1	3–1	1–1	—	0–1	3–3	0–0	2–1
Nea Salamis Famagusta	0–1	2–1	1–1	0–3	0–4	1–1	0–3	2–0	4–0	2–0	—	0–2	3–2	0–2
Omonia	0–0	3–1	3–3	3–1	2–1	2–0	2–2	5–1	4–1	2–1	4–0	—	1–0	1–2
Othellos Athienou	0–0	0–3	2–1	0–2	0–1	0–3	0–1	0–0	2–1	0–3	2–3	1–2	—	0–3
Pafos	0–0	3–1	4–0	1–0	0–1	1–1	1–0	4–0	4–3	3–0	0–0	0–2	3–0	—

Source: Cyprus Football Association
Legend: Blue = home team win; Yellow = draw; Red = away team win.

== Championship round ==
=== League table ===
Pos	Team	Pld	W	D	L	GF	GA	GD	Pts	Qualification
1	APOEL (C)	36	22	7	7	63	24	+39	73 (Note: Head to head points: APOEL 8, AEK 2.)	Qualification for the Champions League second qualifying round
2	AEK Larnaca	36	21	10	5	57	31	+26	73	Qualification for the Conference League second qualifying round
3	Omonia	36	20	9	7	62	37	+25	69	Qualification for the Conference League second qualifying round
4	Aris Limassol	36	20	5	11	63	34	+29	65	
5	Pafos	36	18	8	10	60	33	+27	62	Qualification for the Europa League first qualifying round (Note: Pafos qualified for the Europa League first qualifying round by winning the 2023–24 Cypriot Cup.)
6	Anorthosis Famagusta	36	15	8	13	46	42	+4	53	

Source: Soccerway
Rules for classification: 1) Points; 2) Head-to-head points; 3) Head-to-head goal difference; 4) Head-to-head goals scored; 5) Head-to-head away goals scored (only if two teams); 6) Goal difference; 7) Goals scored; 8) Play-off (only if deciding championship round, relegation round or relegation).
(C) Champions

=== Results ===
Home \ Away	AEK	ANO	APOE	ARI	OMO	PAF
AEK Larnaca	—	1–1	1–2	1–1	2–0	3–0
Anorthosis Famagusta	0–1	—	0–0	0–4	0–2	2–3
APOEL	1–1	0–2	—	2–0	0–1	1–0
Aris Limassol	0–1	1–1	2–1	—	1–2	1–1
Omonia	0–1	2–1	1–0	3–0	—	1–1
Pafos	0–1	5–1	0–2	1–0	1–1	—

Source: Cyprus Football Association
Legend: Blue = home team win; Yellow = draw; Red = away team win.

== Relegation round ==
=== League table ===
Pos	Team	Pld	W	D	L	GF	GA	GD	Pts	Relegation
1	Apollon Limassol	40	18	12	10	64	38	+26	66	
2	AEL Limassol	40	15	9	16	61	68	−7	54	
3	Nea Salamis Famagusta	40	14	9	17	52	61	−9	51	
4	Ethnikos Achna	40	13	11	16	70	79	−9	50	
5	Karmiotissa	40	10	10	20	58	77	−19	40	
6	Doxa Katokopias (R)	40	10	5	25	34	77	−43	35	Relegation to the Cypriot Second Division
7	Othellos Athienou (R)	40	8	9	23	48	77	−29	33	Relegation to the Cypriot Second Division
8	AEZ Zakakiou (R)	40	2	12	26	40	100	−60	18	Relegation to the Cypriot Second Division

Source: Soccerway
Rules for classification: 1) Points; 2) Head-to-head points; 3) Head-to-head goal difference; 4) Head-to-head goals scored; 5) Head-to-head away goals scored (only if two teams); 6) Goal difference; 7) Goals scored; 8) Play-off (only if deciding championship round, relegation round or relegation).
(R) Relegated

=== Results ===
Home \ Away	AEL	AEZ	APOL	DOX	ETH	KAR	NSF	OTH
AEL Limassol	—	2–1	2–1	0–0	1–1	4–3	5–4	3–2
AEZ Zakakiou	1–5	—	1–5	2–3	0–1	2–5	0–3	0–4
Apollon Limassol	4–1	1–0	—	0–1	2–2	0–0	2–0	4–1
Doxa Katokopias	2–2	2–1	0–2	—	6–3	1–4	1–0	0–1
Ethnikos Achna	2–0	6–2	3–3	1–2	—	2–1	2–0	2–1
Karmiotissa	0–0	0–0	0–0	2–1	1–4	—	1–3	6–6
Nea Salamis Famagusta	1–1	1–1	0–2	0–1	2–1	0–2	—	1–1
Othellos Athienou	1–1	3–1	0–1	3–0	2–1	1–2	2–3	—

Source: Cyprus Football Association
Legend: Blue = home team win; Yellow = draw; Red = away team win.

== Season statistics ==
=== Top scorers ===
Rank	Player	Club	Goals
1	(Cyprus) Marios Elia	Ethnikos Achna	19
1	(Cyprus) Andreas Katsantonis	Karmiotissa	19
3	(Argentina) Enzo Cabrera	Ethnikos Achna	18
4	(Brazil) Jairo	Pafos	16
5	(Spain) Fran Sol	AEK Larnaca	15
6	(Sweden) Muamer Tanković	Pafos	14
7	(Portugal) Pedro Marques	Apollon Limassol	13
8	(Spain) Sergio Castel	Anorthosis Famagusta	12
8	(Cape Verde) Willy Semedo	Omonia	12
10	(Bulgaria) Georgi Minchev	AEL Limassol	11

=== Hat-tricks ===
Player	For	Against	Result	Date	Ref
(Spain) Fran Sol^{4}	AEK Larnaca	Ethnikos Achna	5–5	28 August 2023	
(Cyprus) Marios Elia	Ethnikos Achna	AEK Larnaca	5–5	28 August 2023	
(Portugal) Pedro Marques	Apollon Limassol	Doxa Katokopias	4–0	8 October 2023	
(Spain) Fran Sol	AEK Larnaca	Karmiotissa	5–0	21 October 2023	
(Greece) Fiorin Durmishaj	Aris Limassol	Ethnikos Achna	3–2	3 January 2024	
(Sweden) Zakaria Sawo	Nea Salamis Famagusta	Othellos Athienou	4–0	31 January 2024	
(Cyprus) Andreas Katsantonis	Karmiotissa	Doxa Katokopias	4–1	2 March 2024	
(Norway) Mushaga Bakenga	Apollon Limassol	Ethnikos Achna	3–3	23 April 2024	
(Cyprus) Andreas Katsantonis	Karmiotissa	Othellos Athienou	6–6	24 April 2024	
(Bulgaria) Georgi Minchev	AEL Limassol	Nea Salamis Famagusta	5–4	24 April 2024	

Note

^{4} Player scored 4 goals

=== Own goals ===
- (Cameroon) Serge Leuko – Omonia vs Nea Salamis 21 August 2023
- (Croatia) Niko Datković – Omonia vs Nea Salamis 21 August 2023
- (Sweden) Franz Brorsson – Aris Limassol vs Doxa Katokopias 28 August 2023
- (Spain) Ángel García – AEK Larnaca vs Othellos Athienou 16 September 2023
- (Spain) Salva Ferrer – Anorthosis Famagusta vs Aris Limassol 8 October 2023
- (Costa Rica) John Ruiz – AEZ vs Apollon Limassol 21 October 2023
- (Spain) Ángel García – AEK Larnaca vs APOEL 5 November 2023
- (Brazil) Dudu Nardini – Apollon Limassol vs Othellos Athienou 2 January 2024
- (Bosnia and Herzegovina) Hrvoje Miličević – APOEL vs AEK Larnaca 5 February 2024
- (Cyprus) Kypros Christoforou – Karmiotissa vs AEL Limassol 6 February 2024
- (Netherlands) Quint Jansen – AEZ Zakakiou vs Othellos Athienou 9 February 2024
- (Greece) Nikos Melissas – Nea Salamis Famagusta vs Doxa Katokopias 7 March 2024
- (Czech Republic) Josef Kvída – AEK Larnaca vs Pafos 6 April 2024
- (Cameroon) Serge Leuko – Nea Salamis Famagusta vs Apollon Limassol 13 April 2024
- (Netherlands) Mark Sifneos – AEZ Zakakiou vs Doxa Katokopias 23 April 2024

=== Clean sheets ===
As of match played 12 November 2023

Rank	Player	Club	Clean sheets
1	(Brazil) Fabiano	Omonia	6
1	(Slovenia) Vid Belec	APOEL	6
3	(Netherlands) Peter Leeuwenburgh	Apollon Limassol	5
3	(Croatia) Ivica Ivušić	Pafos	5
3	(Bosnia and Herzegovina) Kenan Pirić	AEK Larnaca	5
6	(Brazil) Vaná	Aris Limassol	4
7	(Colombia) Iván Arboleda	Anorthosis Famagusta	3
7	(Greece) Nikos Melissas	Nea Salamis Famagusta	3
9	(Cyprus) Constantinos Panagi	Ethnikos Achna	2
9	(Poland) Mateusz Taudul	Othellos Athienou	2

=== Discipline ===
==== Red cards ====
As of match played 7 May 2024

- (Belgium) Sébastien Dewaest - Doxa Katokopias vs AEL Limassol (21 August 2023)
- (Cameroon) Serge Leuko - AC Omonia vs Nea Salamis Famagusta (21 August 2023)
- (Cyprus) Valentinos Pastellis - AEL Limassol vs AEZ Zakakiou (27 August 2023)
- (Cape Verde) Delmiro - AEL Limassol vs AEZ Zakakiou (27 August 2023)
- (Serbia) Nikola Trujić - Aris Limassol vs Doxa Katokopias (28 August 2023)
- (Sweden) Franz Brorsson - Aris Limassol vs Doxa Katokopias (28 August 2023)
- (Cyprus) Pavlos Correa - Anorthosis Famagusta vs Nea Salamis Famagusta (1 September 2023)
- (Ghana) Benson Anang - Ethnikos Achna vs Othellos Athienou (2 September 2023)
- (Comoros) Fouad Bachirou - AC Omonia vs APOEL (3 September 2023)
- (Guinea-Bissau) Dálcio - AC Omonia vs APOEL (3 September 2023)
- (Morocco) Issam Chebake - AC Omonia vs APOEL (3 September 2023)
- (Serbia) Veljko Simić - AC Omonia vs APOEL (3 September 2023)
- (Brazil) Marquinhos Cipriano - AEL Limassol vs AC Omonia (16 September 2023)
- (Cyprus) Stavros Gavriel - APOEL vs Pafos (27 September 2023)
- (Sweden) Zakaria Sawo - Aris Limassol vs Apollon Limassol (30 September 2023)
- (Germany) Petar Filipović - AEL Limassol vs Anorthosis Famagusta (1 October 2023)
- (Serbia) Bojan Kovacevic - AEK Larnaca vs Karmiotissa (21 October 2023)
- (Cyprus) Marios Peratikos - Nea Salamis vs Ethnkos Achna (25 October 2023)
- (Cyprus) Charalambos Kyriakou - Apollon Limassol vs Pafos (25 October 2023)
- (North Macedonia) Damjan Siskovski - Nea Salamis Famagusta vs Doxa Katokopias (11 November 2023)
- (Croatia) Martin Slogar - Othellos Athienou vs AEZ Zakakiou (12 November 2023)
- (Burkina Faso) Steeve Yago - Karmiotissa vs Aris Limassol (12 November 2023)
- (Cyprus) Georgios Efrem - Aris Limassol vs APOEL (25 November 2023)
- (Bolivia) Danny Bejarano - AEZ Zakakiou vs Nea Salamis Famagusta (26 November 2023)
- (Cyprus) Giorgos Angelopoulos - AC Omonia vs Ethnikos Achna (26 November 2023)
- (Angola) Chico Banza - Anorthosis Famagusta vs AEK Larnaca (2 December 2023)
- (Serbia) Nenad Tomović - Anorthosis Famagusta vs AEK Larnaca (2 December 2023)
- (Suriname) Dion Malone - Karmiotissa vs AEZ Zakakiou (3 December 2023)
- (Nigeria) Ezekiel Henty - AEL Limassol vs Aris Limassol (4 December 2023)
- (North Macedonia) Martin Bogatinov - Ethnikos Achna vs AEK Larnaca (16 December 2023)
- (Colombia) Iván Arboleda - Anorthosis Famagusta vs Othellos Athienou (16 December 2023)
- (Ghana) Emmanuel Lomotey - Othellos Athienou vs Ethnikos Achna (21 December 2023)
- (Cyprus) Andreas Christou - Aris Limassol vs AEZ Zakakiou (21 December 2023)
- (Tunisia) Habib Oueslati - Othellos Athienou vs Ethnikos Achna (3 January 2024)
- (Spain) Sergio Tejera - APOEL vs Anorthosis Famagusta (6 January 2024)
- (Senegal) Mamadou Sané - Aris Limassol vs AC Omonia (7 January 2024)
- (Ghana) Alex Opoku Sarfo - AEK Larnaca vs AEZ Zakakiou (8 January 2024)
- (Cyprus) Marios Demetriou - Doxa Katokopias vs Pafos (8 January 2024)
- (Bolivia) Danny Bejarano - Nea Salamis Famagusta vs AEK Larnaca (12 January 2024)
- (Slovakia) Adrián Slávik - Othellos Athienou vs Doxa Katokopias (13 January 2024)
- (Cyprus) Evagoras Antoniou - Pafos vs AEZ Zakakiou (14 January 2024)
- (Brazil) Cajú - Apollon Limassol vs Aris Limassol (14 January 2024)
- (Cyprus) Panayiotis Artymatas - AEL Limassol vs Ethnikos Achna (20 January 2024)
- (Senegal) Senou Coulibaly - AC Omonia vs Pafos (27 January 2024)
- (Netherlands) Peter Leeuwenburgh - Apollon Limassol vs AEZ Zakakiou (27 January 2024)
- (Senegal) Moussa Wagué - AC Omonia vs Anorthosis Famagusta (9 February 2024)
- (Greece) Giannis Kargas - Anorthosis Famagusta vs Anorthosis Famagusta (14 February 2024)
- (Brazil) Bruno Santos - Anorthosis Famagusta vs Anorthosis Famagusta (14 February 2024)
- (Cyprus) Marios Stylianou - Ethnikos Achna vs AC Omonia (14 February 2024)
- (Cyprus) Alexandros Antoniou - Karmiotissa vs Doxa Katokopias (15 February 2024)
- (Cyprus) Andreas Christodoulou - APOEL vs Aris Limassol (15 February 2024)
- (Serbia) Slobodan Urošević - APOEL vs Aris Limassol (15 February 2024)
- (England) Morgan Brown - Aris Limassol vs AEL Limassol (15 February 2024)
- (England) George Marsh - Aris Limassol vs AEL Limassol (15 February 2024)
- (Cyprus) Antonis Eleftheriou - AEL Limassol vs AEZ Zakakiou (25 February 2024)
- (Argentina) Matías Melluso - Pafos vs AEK Larnaca (25 February 2024)
- (Tunisia) Habib Oueslati - Karmiotissa vs Pafos (6 March 2024)
- (Angola) Chico Banza - Anorthosis Famagusta vs Pafos (10 March 2024)
- (Serbia) Radosav Petrović - Aris Limassol vs APOEL (10 March 2024)
- (Senegal) Ousseynou Thioune - Anorthosis Famagusta vs AEK Larnaca (17 March 2024)
- (Cyprus) Kostakis Artymatas - Aris Limassol vs Anorthosis Famagusta (31 March 2024)
- (Burkina Faso) Steeve Yago - Aris Limassol vs Anorthosis Famagusta (31 March 2024)
- (Israel) Yigal Becker - AEZ Zakakiou vs Nea Salamis Famagusta (4 April 2024)
- (Slovakia) Erik Sabo - AEZ Zakakiou vs Nea Salamis Famagusta (4 April 2024)
- (Ghana) Alex Opoku - AEZ Zakakiou vs AEL Limassol (8 April 2024)
- (Senegal) Mamadou Sané - APOEL vs Aris Limassol (21 April 2024)
- (Cyprus) Charalambos Kyriakou - Othellos Athienou vs Doxa Katokopias (7 May 2024)
