= Bac Ninh FC =

Vietnamese football club

Bắc Ninh FC
- Full name: Bac Ninh Football Club (Câu lạc bộ bóng đá Bắc Ninh)
- Nickname: Đội bóng xứ Kinh Bắc (Team of Kinh Bắc)
- Founded: 2023; 3 years ago
- Ground: Việt Yên Stadium
- Capacity: 12,500
- Chairman: Nguyễn Tuấn Anh
- Manager: Paulo Foiani
- League: V.League 1
- 2025–26: V.League 2, 2nd of 12 (promoted)
- Website: facebook.com
Home colours	Away colours

Bac Ninh Football Club (Vietnamese: Câu lạc bộ bóng đá Bắc Ninh) is a Vietnamese football club based in Bắc Ninh who plays their home matches at the Việt Yên Stadium. They currently play in V.League 1, the highest tier of the Vietnamese football league system.

== History ==
Bắc Ninh Football Club was established in 2023, based on the "Bắc Ninh Province Men's Football Development Project" 2024–2030 of the People's Committee of Bắc Ninh province. The club made its public debut in early 2024 by winning a four-team friendly tournament, the "Chào Xuân 2024" Cup. The project is backed by the Hanaka Group, a prominent local corporation, which provides strong financial support.

In 2024, Bắc Ninh entered the Vietnamese Second Division after purchasing the participation spot of Gia Định. The club appointed former Sông Lam Nghệ An's manager Ngô Quang Trường as the head coach, and also signed a five-year deal with former Vietnam national team former manager Park Hang-seo as its sports advisor. In their first season, the team managed to top their group in the Second Division and qualified to the promotion play-off game. There, they lost in the penalty shootout (after a 2–2 draw) against Hồ Chí Minh City Youth and failed to promote to the V.League 2.

In the 2025 season, the club successfully promoted to V.League 2 as professional football for the first time by defeating Hà Nội B in the 12th matchday of the 2025 Second Division. After the promotion, the club invested heavily in its squad, signing several high-profile players with V.League 1 and national team experience, such as Nguyễn Hải Huy, Trương Văn Thiết and Hà Đức Chinh.

Bắc Ninh finished second in the 2025–26 V.League 2, and promoted to the V.League 1 via the promotion/relegation play-offs after defeating PVF-CAND in the penalty shootout.

== Colours and logo ==
The club's traditional colours are blue, yellow, and black. The logo is designed as a blue shield with a golden border, symbolizing strength and stability. The centerpiece is a golden dragon from the Lý Dynasty era, representing prosperity and power. This iconography is a direct reference to the history and culture of the Bắc Ninh–Kinh Bắc region, the birthplace of the Lý dynasty. The words "BAC NINH" and "FOOTBALL CLUB" are inscribed above and below the dragon, respectively, along with the founding year, 2023. The logo reflects both sporting ambition and pride in the local heritage of Quan họ folk singing.

== Kit and sponsorship ==
Period	Kit manufacturer	Shirt sponsor
2023	Joma	None
2024–present	Kamito	Hanaka Group

== Stadium ==
While competing in the Second Division, Bắc Ninh's home ground was Từ Sơn City Stadium in Đồng Kỵ ward, Từ Sơn. The stadium has a capacity of approximately 5,000 spectators.

After promoting to the 2025–26 V.League 2, Bắc Ninh moved to the Việt Yên Stadium. Inaugurated in late 2024, the stadium is a modern sports facility covering an area of over 8,000m². The first phase of the stadium has a capacity of 7,500 seats, with a future expansion planned to accommodate 22,000 spectators. Following the team's promotion to the 2026–27 V.League 1, Việt Yên Stadium went through several upgrades, including the construction of a 5,000 capacity temporarily stand to expand the stadium to 12,500 seats, in order to fully meet the professional competition standards of the V.League 1.

== Current squad ==
As of 3 September 2026

Note: Flags indicate national team as defined under FIFA eligibility rules; some limited exceptions apply. Players may hold more than one non-FIFA nationality.

No.	Pos.	Nation	Player
1	GK	VIE	Nguyễn Văn Công
2	DF	VIE	Đinh Văn Trường
3	DF	VIE	Nguyễn Ngọc Thắng
5	MF	VIE	Vũ Hồng Quân
7	FW	VIE	Vũ Xuân Tín
8	MF	BRA	Vitão
9	FW	BRA	Brenner Marlos
10	FW	ENG	David Fisher
11	MF	VIE	Lê Tiến Anh
14	MF	VIE	Nguyễn Hải Huy
15	DF	VIE	Nguyễn Văn Việt
16	DF	VIE	Nguyễn Văn Đạt
18	DF	VIE	Mai Xuân Quyết
19	MF	USA	Reece Gaylor (on loan from Thép Xanh Nam Định)
21	DF	VIE	Phan Thế Hưng

No.	Pos.	Nation	Player
25	GK	VIE	Đoàn Huy Hoàng (on loan from Thể Công–Viettel)
27	DF	VIE	Lê Thắng Long (on loan from PVF)
28	FW	VIE	Trần Văn Thành
29	FW	VIE	Ngân Văn Đại
30	MF	VIE	Lương Hoàng Nam
31	DF	VIE	Nguyễn Chính Đăng
36	DF	VIE	Nguyễn Minh Tùng
37	GK	VIE	Lê Văn Hùng
43	DF	VIE	Nguyễn Trọng Kiệt
45	DF	VIE	Lê Văn Xuân
68	MF	VIE	Trần Văn Trung
80	MF	CAN	Pierre Lamothe
86	DF	VIE	Vũ Tiến Long (on loan from Hà Nội)
88	MF	VIE	Phạm Văn Thành
99	DF	BRA	Rafael Santos

=== Unregistred players ===
Note: Flags indicate national team as defined under FIFA eligibility rules; some limited exceptions apply. Players may hold more than one non-FIFA nationality.

No.	Pos.	Nation	Player
4	DF	VIE	Vũ Hoàng Trà
6	DF	VIE	Nguyễn Văn Sơn
22	MF	VIE	Lê Sỹ Minh
24	MF	VIE	Nguyễn Tiến Anh

No.	Pos.	Nation	Player
35	DF	VIE	Nguyễn Duy Dương
47	GK	CAN	Aaron Napierala
50	GK	VIE	Trương Gia Huy

== Coaching staff ==
Position	Name
Head coach	(Brazil) Paulo Foiani
Assistant coach	(Brazil) Rodrigo Casagrande (Vietnam) Nguyễn Chí Công (Vietnam) Phạm Hùng Vương
Goalkeeper coach	(Vietnam) Nguyễn Văn Phong
Fitness coach	(Brazil) Fabio Rinaldo
Technical analyst	(Brazil) Márcio Siedschlag
Sports coordinator	(Vietnam) Nguyễn Công Thường
Physiotherapist	(Vietnam) Cao Thanh An (Vietnam) Đổng Hải Nguyên
Interpreter	(Vietnam) Lê Đức Thắng (Vietnam) Nguyễn Anh Hoài

== Managers ==
Period	Manager
2024–2025	(Vietnam) Ngô Quang Trường
2025	(Vietnam) Hoàng Anh Tuấn
2025	(Vietnam) Phạm Hùng Vương (interim)
2025–present	(Brazil) Paulo Foiani

== Honours ==
=== Domestic competitions ===
- V. League 2
  - Runner-up (1): 2025–26
- Vietnamese Second Division
  - Runners-up (2): 2024, 2025

=== Other competitions ===
- Chào Xuân Friendly Cup
  - Champions (1): 2024
