= Paulo Foiani =

Brazilian footballer (born 1976)

Personal information
- Full name: Paulo Foiani
- Date of birth: 29 November 1976 (age 49)
- Place of birth: Santo André, Brazil
- Position: Midfielder

Team information
- Current team: Bắc Ninh (head coach)

Youth career
- 1996: Londrina

Senior career*
Years	Team	Apps	(Gls)
1996	Londrina		
1997–2001	Coritiba	21	(1)
1998–1999	→ Joinville (loan)		
2003	Villa Nova		
2004	Caxias		
2004	Veranópolis		
2004–2006	Avaí	19	(1)
2007	Atlético Sorocaba	5	(0)
2007	Itapirense	13	(1)
2007–2008	Hòa Phát Hà Nội		
2009	ASA	10	(1)
2010	CRB		
2010–2011	Icasa	46	(0)
2011–2012	Anapolina	8	(0)
2012	Operário Ferroviário	5	(0)
2012	Cambé		

Managerial career
- 2013: Operário Ferroviário (assistant)
- 2013: Operário Ferroviário (interim)
- 2013: Marcílio Dias
- 2014: Toledo
- 2014: Operário Ferroviário
- 2014–2015: FC Cascavel
- 2015: Camboriú
- 2015: Juazeirense
- 2016: Jacuipense
- 2016: ASA
- 2017: Campinense
- 2017: Tricordiano
- 2017: Fluminense de Feira
- 2017–2018: Sinop
- 2019: FC Cascavel
- 2019: Boa Esporte
- 2019: Marcílio Dias
- 2020: Sergipe
- 2020: Freipaulistano
- 2021: Sergipe
- 2021: Marcílio Dias
- 2022: Juventus Jaraguá
- 2022: Uberlândia
- 2022: Jacobinense
- 2022–2023: Công An Hà Nội
- 2024: Fluminense de Feira
- 2025: Sousa
- 2025–: Bắc Ninh
- * Club domestic league appearances and goals

Paulo Foiani (born 29 November 1976) is a Brazilian football manager and former player. He is the current head coach of V.League 1 club Bắc Ninh.

== Playing career ==
Before becoming a manager, Foiani had a long professional playing career as a midfielder. He began his career at Londrina before moving to Coritiba and went on to play for numerous clubs in Brazil, such as Avaí, Joinville, and Icasa. He also had a brief spell in Vietnam, playing for Hòa Phát Hà Nội during the 2007–08 season.

== Managerial career ==
Foiani began his coaching career in 2013 in his native Brazil, managing a host of clubs in state and national leagues. His career has been diverse, marked by frequent short-term spells at numerous clubs, including Operário Ferroviário, Marcílio Dias, Cascavel, Sinop, and Boa Esporte.

In December 2022, Foiani moved to Vietnam for the first time as a manager, taking charge of Công An Hà Nội ahead of the 2023 V.League 1. However, he parted ways with the club in April 2023 after only a few matches.

After returning to Brazil and leading Sousa to a state championship title, Foiani returned to Vietnam was appointed head coach of Bắc Ninh on 23 July 2025.

== Honours ==
=== Manager ===
Marcílio Dias

- Campeonato Catarinense Série B: 2013
- Copa Santa Catarina runner-up: 2019

Cascavel

- Campeonato Paranaense Segunda Divisão: 2014

Juazeirense

- Copa Governador do Estado da Bahia runner-up: 2015

Sinop

- Campeonato Matogrossense runner-up: 2018

Sergipe

- Campeonato Sergipano runner-up: 2020

Sousa

- Campeonato Paraibano: 2024

=== Individual ===
- Campeonato Sergipano Best Coach: 2020
- Campeonato Paraibano Best Coach: 2024
