= Andreas Katsantonis =

Cypriot footballer

Personal information
- Date of birth: 16 February 2000 (age 26)
- Place of birth: Nicosia, Cyprus
- Height: 1.81 m (5 ft 11 in)
- Position: Forward

Team information
- Current team: Piast Gliwice
- Number: 10

Youth career
- Olympiakos Nicosia
- 2016–2018: Omonia
- 2018–2020: APOEL

Senior career*
Years	Team	Apps	(Gls)
2016–2018	Omonia	9	(2)
2018–2022	APOEL	25	(3)
2019–2020	→ Ayia Napa (loan)	15	(0)
2022	Dalkurd	12	(0)
2022–2023	Panserraikos	26	(3)
2023–2024	Karmiotissa	36	(19)
2024–	Piast Gliwice	38	(4)

International career^{‡}
2016–2017	Cyprus U17	12	(6)
2017–2019	Cyprus U19	20	(6)
2019–2022	Cyprus U21	12	(0)
2024–	Cyprus	1	(0)
- * Club domestic league appearances and goals as of 01:44, 1 November 2026 (UTC) ‡ National team caps and goals as of 7 October 2024

Andreas Katsantonis (Greek: Ανδρέας Κατσαντώνης; born 16 February 2000) is a Cypriot professional footballer who plays as a forward for Polish club Piast Gliwice and the Cyprus national team.

== Club career ==
On 5 September 2024, Katsantonis joined Polish Ekstraklasa club Piast Gliwice on a three-year contract with the option for a further twelve months. On 3 February 2025, he scored his first goal for Piast in a 1–3 away victory over Śląsk Wrocław. Five days later, his season was cut short when he suffered an ACL tear during a 1–0 home win against Legia Warsaw, ruling him out of play for approximately one year.

== International career ==
Katsantonis was first called up to the Cyprus national team in June 2021 for a friendly against Hungary, he remained on the bench on that occasion.

== Career statistics ==
=== Club ===
As of match played 23 May 2026

Appearances and goals by club, season and competition
Club	Season	League			National cup (Note: Includes Cypriot Cup, Greek Cup, Polish Cup)		Europe		Other		Total	
Club	Season	Division	Apps	Goals	Apps	Goals	Apps	Goals	Apps	Goals	Apps	Goals
Omonia	2016–17	Cypriot First Division	2	1	0	0	—		—		2	1
Omonia	2017–18	Cypriot First Division	7	1	0	0	—		—		7	1
Omonia	Total		9	2	0	0	0	0	0	0	9	2
APOEL	2018–19	Cypriot First Division	0	0	0	0	0	0	0	0	0	0
APOEL	2020–21	Cypriot First Division	23	3	4	0	0	0	—		27	3
APOEL	2021–22	Cypriot First Division	2	0	0	0	0	0	—		2	0
APOEL	Total		25	3	4	0	0	0	0	0	29	3
Ayia Napa (loan)	2019–20	Cypriot Second Division	15	0	0	0	—		—		15	0
Dalkurd	2022	Superettan	12	0	—		—		—		12	0
Panserraikos	2022–23	Super League Greece 2	26	3	5	4	—		—		31	7
Karmiotissa	2023–24	Cypriot First Division	34	19	1	0	—		—		35	19
Karmiotissa	2024–25	Cypriot First Division	2	0	0	0	—		—		2	0
Karmiotissa	Total		36	19	1	0	—		—		37	19
Piast Gliwice	2024–25	Ekstraklasa	12	1	3	0	—		—		15	1
Piast Gliwice	2025–26	Ekstraklasa	13	1	0	0	—		—		13	1
Piast Gliwice	Total		25	2	3	0	—		—		28	2
Career total			148	29	13	4	0	0	0	0	161	33

=== International ===
As of match played 11 June 2024

Appearances and goals by national team and year
National team	Year	Apps	Goals
Cyprus	2024	1	0
Total		1	0

== Honours ==
Individual

- Cypriot First Division top scorer: 2023–24
