= Habib Oueslati =

Tunisian footballer (born 1997)

Personal information
- Date of birth: 10 August 1997 (age 29)
- Place of birth: La Seyne-sur-Mer, France
- Height: 1.69 m (5 ft 7 in)
- Position: Midfielder

Team information
- Current team: Newroz SC
- Number: 17

Youth career
- 2014–2017: Lyon B
- 2017–2018: Angers B

Senior career*
| Years | Team | Apps | (Gls) |
| 2018–2020 | CS Sfaxien | 41 | (4) |
| 2021–2023 | Peyia 2014 | 26 | (7) |
| 2023–2024 | Othellos Athienou | 20 | (2) |
| 2024 | Karmiotissa | 14 | (1) |
| 2024-2026 | Al-Talaba SC | 10 | (0) |
| 2026- | Newroz SC | 9 | (3) |

International career^{‡}
| 2018 | Tunisia U21 | 1 | (0) |
| 2019 | Tunisia | 1 | (0) |
- * Club domestic league appearances and goals as of 23 December 2024 @ 19:04(AEST) ‡ National team caps and goals as of 20 October 2019

Habib Oueslati (born 10 August 1997) is a professional footballer who plays as a midfielder for Newroz SC. Born in France, he represented Tunisia at international level.

== Career ==
Oueslati participated in the Confederation Cup in 2019 with the CS Sfaxien. He reached the semi-finals of this competition, being beaten by the Moroccan club of the RS Berkane.

In July, 2023, Oueslati joined Cypriot club Othellos Athienou.

== Personal life ==
Oueslati holds both French and Tunisian nationalities. His older brother Abdelkader is also a professional footballer.

== Career statistics ==
=== Club ===
As of match played 19 August 2023

Appearances and goals by club, season and competition
| Club | Season | League | | | National cup | | Continental | | Total | |
| Club | Season | Division | Apps | Goals | Apps | Goals | Apps | Goals | Apps | Goals |
|---|---|---|---|---|---|---|---|---|---|---|
| CS Sfaxien | 2018–19 | Tunisian Ligue Professionnelle 1 | 16 | 2 | 3 | 0 | 10 (Note: Appearances in CAF Confederation Cup) | 1 | 29 | 3 |
| CS Sfaxien | 2019–20 | Tunisian Ligue Professionnelle 1 | 10 | 1 | 1 | 0 | 1 (Note: Appearances in CAF Confederation Cup) | 0 | 12 | 1 |
| CS Sfaxien | Total | | 26 | 3 | 4 | 0 | 11 | 1 | 41 | 4 |
| Peyia 2014 | 2022–23 | Cypriot Second Division | 25 | 6 | 1 | 1 | 0 | 0 | 26 | 7 |
| Othellos Athienou | 2023–24 | Cypriot First Division | 1 | 0 | 0 | 0 | 0 | 0 | 1 | 0 |
| Career total | | | 52 | 9 | 5 | 1 | 11 | 1 | 68 | 11 |

=== International ===
Statistics accurate as of match played 20 October 2019.

Tunisia
| Year | Apps | Goals |
|---|---|---|
| 2019 | 1 | 0 |
| Total | 1 | 0 |

== Honours ==
CS Sfaxien

- Tunisian Cup: 2019
