= Mai Xuân Quyết =

Vietnamese footballer

Personal information
- Full name: Mai Xuân Quyết
- Date of birth: 1 April 1999 (age 27)
- Place of birth: Thái Bình, Vietnam
- Height: 1.71 m (5 ft 7 in)
- Position: Forward

Team information
- Current team: Bắc Ninh
- Number: 77

Youth career
- 2015–2017: Nam Định

Senior career*
Years	Team	Apps	(Gls)
2018–2024	Thép Xanh Nam Định	84	(6)
2024–2025	Quy Nhơn Bình Định	17	(0)
2025–	Bắc Ninh	22	(0)

International career^{‡}
2021–2022	Vietnam U23	3	(0)
Medal record
Men's football
Representing Vietnam
AFF U-23 Championship
Winner	2022 Cambodia
- * Club domestic league appearances and goals as of 12 September 2026 ‡ National team caps and goals as of 19 February 2022

Mai Xuân Quyết (born 1 April 1999) is a Vietnamese professional footballer who plays as a forward for V.League 1 club Bắc Ninh.

== Club career ==
Born in Thái Bình province, Mai Xuân Quyết started his career at Nam Dinh FC and progressed through the club's academy. He made his first-team debut in the 2018 Vietnamese Cup. He became a regular first-team squad member the following season.

== International career ==
He was part of the Vietnam U23 team that won the 2022 AFF U-23 Championship.

== Career statistics ==
As of match played 15 November 2025

Appearances and goals by club, season and competition
Club	Season	League			Cup		Continental		Other		Total	
Club	Season	Division	Apps	Goals	Apps	Goals	Apps	Goals	Apps	Goals	Apps	Goals
Thép Xanh Nam Định	2018	V.League 1	0	0	1	0	—		0	0	1	0
Thép Xanh Nam Định	2019	V.League 1	22	3	3	2	—		—		25	5
Thép Xanh Nam Định	2020	V.League 1	18	0	2	1	—		—		20	1
Thép Xanh Nam Định	2021	V.League 1	11	2	0	0	—		—		11	2
Thép Xanh Nam Định	2022	V.League 1	17	1	0	0	—		—		17	1
Thép Xanh Nam Định	2023	V.League 1	16	0	2	0	—		—		18	0
Thép Xanh Nam Định	2023–24	V.League 1	0	0	1	0	—		—		1	0
Thép Xanh Nam Định	Total		84	6	9	3	0	0	0	0	93	9
Quy Nhơn Bình Định	2024–25	V.League 1	17	0	1	0	—		0	0	18	0
Bắc Ninh	2025–26	V.League 2	0	0	2	0	—		0	0	2	0
Career total			101	6	12	3	0	0	0	0	113	9

== Honours ==
Vietnam U23

- AFF U-23 Championship: 2022
