= Quỳnh Phụ =

- Commune
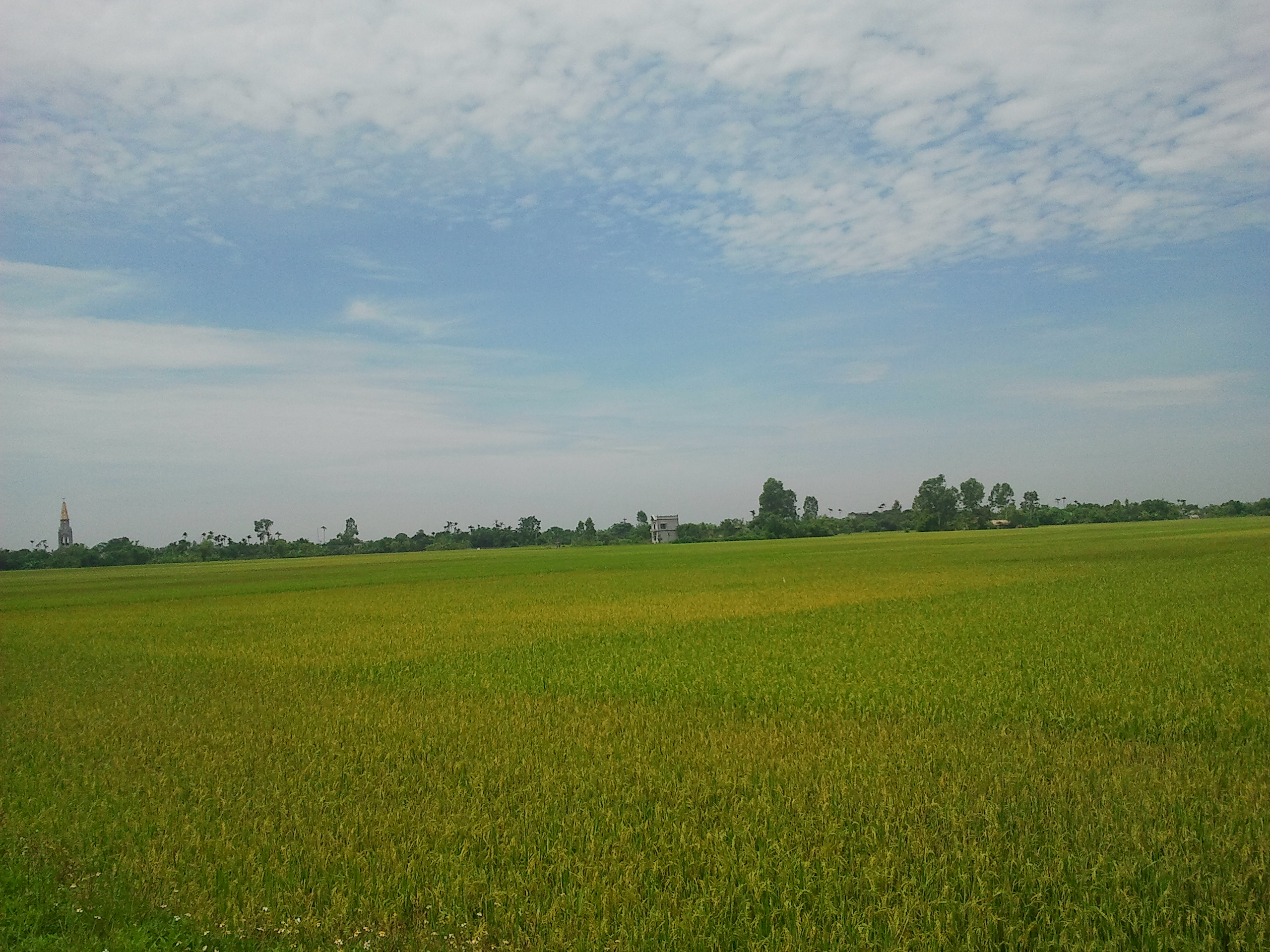
- A section of a rice field in the commune
- Interactive map of Quỳnh Phụ
- Coordinates: 20.65170°N 106.33855°E
- Country: Vietnam
- Region: Red River Delta
- Province: Hưng Yên province
- Established: 16 June 2025

Area
  - Total: 31.68 km^{2} (12.23 sq mi)

Population (2025)
  - Total: 51,820
  - Density: 1,636/km^{2} (4,240/sq mi)

Quỳnh Phụ is a commune in Hưng Yên province, Vietnam.

== History ==
The commune inherited its name from the former Quỳnh Phụ district of Thái Bình province.

On 12 June 2025, the National Assembly of Vietnam adopted Resolution No. 202/2025/QH15 on the reorganization of provincial-level administrative units, effective on the same date. Under the resolution, the entire area and population of Thái Bình province and Hưng Yên province were merged to form a new province named Hưng Yên.

On 16 June 2025, the National Assembly of Vietnam adopted Resolution No. 203/2025/QH15 amending and supplementing several articles of the Constitution of the Socialist Republic of Vietnam, effective on the same date. Under the resolution, district-level administrative units nationwide ceased to operate from 1 July 2025.

The Standing Committee of the National Assembly of Vietnam issued Resolution No. 1666/NQ-UBTVQH15 on the arrangement of commune-level administrative units in Hưng Yên province in 2025, effective from 16 June 2025. Under the resolution, the entire area and population of Quỳnh Côi township and Quỳnh Hải, Quỳnh Hội, Quỳnh Hồng, Quỳnh Mỹ, and Quỳnh Hưng communes were merged to form a new commune named Quỳnh Phụ.
