= Vũ Quang Nam =

Vietnamese footballer

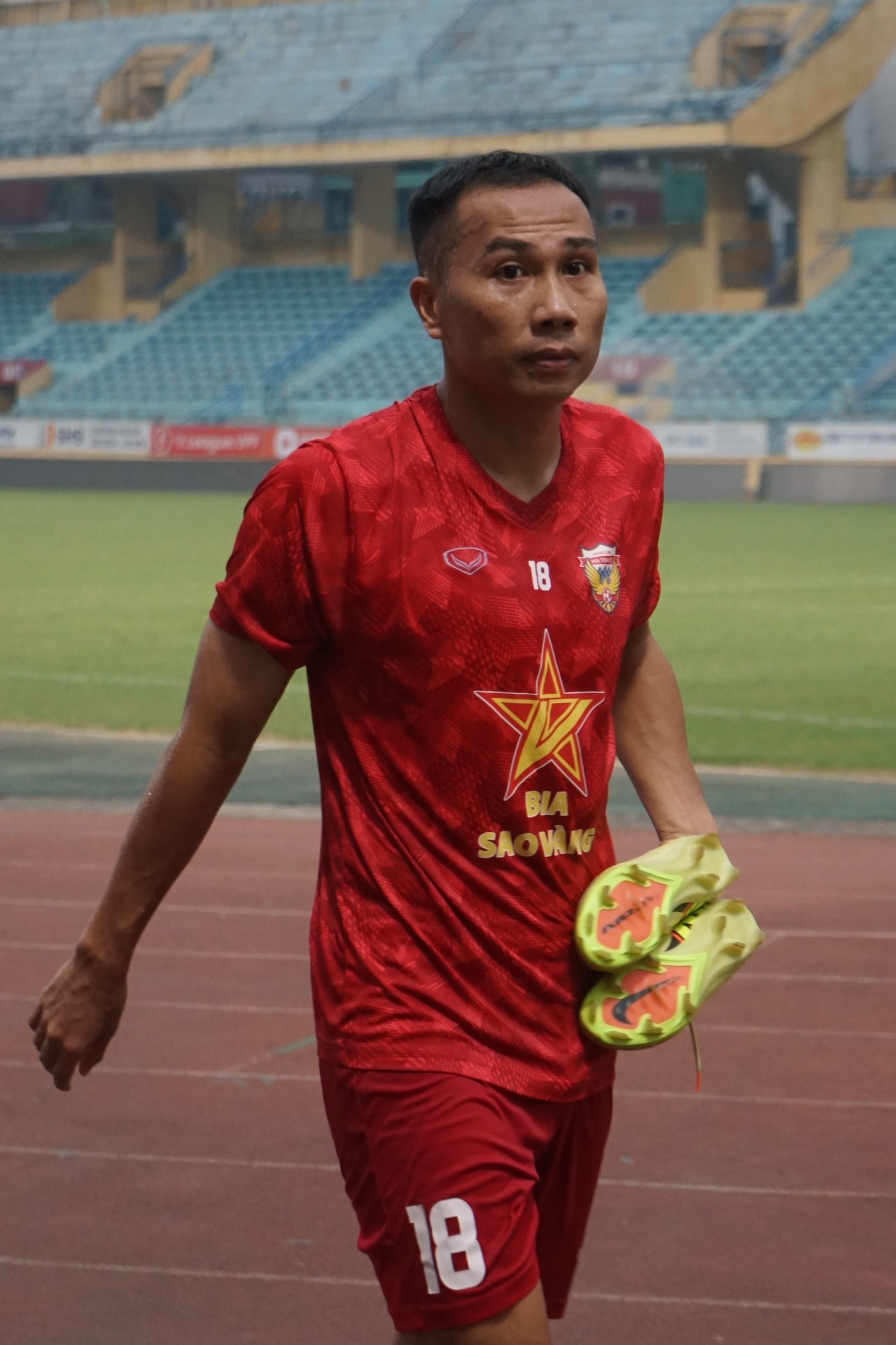
- Quang Nam in 2026

Personal information
- Full name: Vũ Quang Nam
- Date of birth: 22 August 1992 (age 34)
- Place of birth: Quỳnh Lưu, Nghệ An, Vietnam
- Height: 1.80 m (5 ft 11 in)
- Position: Winger

Team information
- Current team: Hồng Lĩnh Hà Tĩnh
- Number: 18

Youth career
- 2010–2012: Sông Lam Nghệ An

Senior career*
Years	Team	Apps	(Gls)
2012–2015	Sông Lam Nghệ An	7	(0)
2012	→ Huế (loan)	11	(0)
2016	Phú Yên	12	(2)
2017	Huế	5	(0)
2017–2021	Hồ Chí Minh City	63	(5)
2021	→ Bà Rịa Vũng Tàu	0	(0)
2022	Cần Thơ	5	(1)
2023–	Hồng Lĩnh Hà Tĩnh	60	(6)
- * Club domestic league appearances and goals as of 7 October 2026

Vũ Quang Nam (born 22 August 1992) is a Vietnamese professional footballer who plays as a winger for V.League 1 club Hồng Lĩnh Hà Tĩnh.

He started his career with Sông Lam Nghệ An.

== Honours ==
=== Club ===
Sông Lam Nghệ An

- Vietnamese National U-21 Football Championship: 2012
