= Carlos Dias (footballer) =

Brazilian footballer (born 2000)

Personal information
- Full name: Carlos Eduardo Oliveira Dias
- Date of birth: 23 January 2000 (age 26)
- Place of birth: Rio Negro, Paraná, Brazil
- Height: 1.79 m (5 ft 10 in)
- Position: Midfielder

Youth career
- Paraná

Senior career*
Years	Team	Apps	(Gls)
2019–2020	Paraná	1	(0)
2020–2024	APOEL	8	(0)
2021–2022	→ PAEEK (loan)	23	(0)
2022–2024	→ Al-Fujairah (loan)		
- * Club domestic league appearances and goals as of 13 May 2021

Carlos Eduardo Oliveira Dias (born 23 January 2000), commonly known as Carlos Dias, is a Brazilian professional footballer who currently plays as a midfielder.

== Career ==
=== APOEL ===
In May 2020 APOEL signed Dias from Paraná.
