= Phạm Văn Thành =

Vietnamese footballer

Personal information
- Full name: Phạm Văn Thành
- Date of birth: March 16, 1994 (age 32)
- Place of birth: Đông Hưng, Thái Bình, Vietnam
- Height: 1.74 m (5 ft 9 in)
- Position: Winger

Team information
- Current team: Bắc Ninh
- Number: 88

Youth career
- 2009–2013: Hà Nội

Senior career*
Years	Team	Apps	(Gls)
2014–2018	Hà Nội	73	(14)
2019–2020	Hồ Chí Minh City	32	(2)
2021–2024	Quy Nhơn Bình Định	59	(3)
2024–2025	Phù Đổng Ninh Bình	15	(2)
2025–	Bắc Ninh	11	(0)

International career
2015–2016	Vietnam U21	1	(0)
- * Club domestic league appearances and goals as of 12 June 2026

Phạm Văn Thành (born 16 March 1994) is a Vietnamese professional footballer who plays as a winger for V.League 1 club Bắc Ninh.

== Honours ==
Hà Nội

- V.League 1: 2016, 2018
- Vietnamese National Cup runners-up: 2015, 2016
- Vietnamese Super Cup runners-up: 2013, 2016, 2017

Phù Đổng Ninh Bình

- V.League 2: 2024–25
