= Lê Sỹ Minh =

Vietnamese footballer (born 1993)

Personal information
- Full name: Lê Sỹ Minh
- Date of birth: 23 March 1993 (age 33)
- Place of birth: Hưng Hà, Thái Bình, Vietnam
- Height: 1.70 m (5 ft 7 in)
- Position: Midfielder

Team information
- Current team: Bắc Ninh
- Number: 22

Youth career
- 2004–2007: Thái Bình
- 2007–2014: Nam Định

Senior career*
Years	Team	Apps	(Gls)
2014–2018	Nam Định	51	(9)
2018–2019	Than Quảng Ninh	6	(0)
2019–2020	Nam Định	23	(3)
2021	Hồ Chí Minh City	4	(0)
2022	Hải Phòng	5	(0)
2024–	Bắc Ninh	33	(3)
- * Club domestic league appearances and goals as of 12 June 2026

Lê Sỹ Minh (born 23 March 1993) is a Vietnamese professional footballer who plays as a midfielder for V.League 1 club Bắc Ninh.
