= Lê Văn Hưng (footballer, born 2000) =

Vietnamese footballer

Personal information
- Full name: Lê Văn Hưng
- Date of birth: 26 August 2000 (age 26)
- Place of birth: Đà Nẵng, Vietnam
- Height: 1.86 m (6 ft 1 in)
- Position: Centre back

Team information
- Current team: Đông Á Thanh Hóa (on loan from SHB Đà Nẵng)
- Number: 43

Youth career
- –2018: SHB Đà Nẵng

Senior career*
Years	Team	Apps	(Gls)
2018–2021	SHB Đà Nẵng B		
2022–	SHB Đà Nẵng	34	(1)
2022	→ Khánh Hòa (loan)	0	(0)
2023	→ Quảng Nam (loan)	14	(4)
2026	→ Đông Á Thanh Hóa (loan)	5	(0)
- * Club domestic league appearances and goals as of 7 June 2026

Lê Văn Hưng (born 26 August 2000) is a Vietnamese professional footballer who plays as a center back for V.League 1 club Đông Á Thanh Hóa, on loan from SHB Đà Nẵng.

== Club career ==
Born in Đà Nẵng, Văn Hưng was formed at the SHB Đà Nẵng youth academy. He was loaned to Khánh Hòa in 2022 but didn't make any appearance.

In 2023, Văn Hưng was loaned to V.League 2 side Quảng Nam. Being one of the tallest outfield player in the league, took advantage of height as to win aerial duels and score from headers. He finished the season with 6 goals after 16 appearances for the club, helping them win the league title which promoted them to the 2023–24 V.League 1.

== Honours ==
Khánh Hòa

- V.League 2: 2022

Quảng Nam

- V.League 2: 2023

SHB Đà Nẵng

- V.League 2: 2023–24
